= Devilman (disambiguation) =

Devilman is a Japanese manga series.

Devilman or Devil Man may also refer to:

- Devilman (film), a 2004 Japanese film based on the manga series
- Akira Fudo, the protagonist of the manga series
- Devilman or Akkuman, a character in the Dragon Ball franchise
- "Super-Charger Heaven", a 1995 song by White Zombie, sometimes referred to as "Devil Man" due to its chorus

== See also ==
- Devil Lady, a Japanese manga series
- The Devil's Man, a 1967 Italian film
