= Akira Fudo =

Fictional character from Go Nagai's manga series Devilman

- Devilman character
- Akira Fudo in his human form, by Go Nagai
- First appearance: Devilman vol. 1: "Devil's Awakening" (1972)
- Created by: Go Nagai
- Voiced by (Japanese): Ryōichi Tanaka (1972 anime, Devil Lady); Show Hayami (1987 OVA); Tomokazu Seki (New Cutie Honey); Shin-ichiro Miki (PS1 game); Shinji Takeda (2000 OVA); Shintarō Asanuma (2015 OVA); Kōki Uchiyama (Crybaby)
- Voiced by (English): Alan Marriott (1987 OVA); Brett Weaver (New Cutie Honey); Bryce Papenbrook (2015 OVA); Griffin Burns (Crybaby)
- Portrayed by: Hisato Izaki (2004 film)

In-universe information
- Alias: Devilman
- Species: Human; Devilman
- Gender: Male
- Occupation: Student
- Nationality: Japanese
- Abilities: Superhuman strength, speed, durability, reactions, stamina and senses; Flight; Sharp teeth; Healing factor; Energy beam; Razor sharp claws; Heat beams; Fire breath; Tail whip; Limited telepathy

Akira Fudo (Japanese: 不動明, Hepburn: Fudō Akira) is a fictional character and the main protagonist of the Devilman manga series created by Go Nagai. A shy teenager living in Japan while his parents work abroad, Akira absorbs the powers of the devil Amon thanks to his friend Ryo Asuka. Then as the self-proclaimed title character Devilman (デビルマン, Debiruman), Akira starts fighting numerous enemies hidden in the world. The character also appears in the multiple anime adaptations of the series, though his role differs based on media. The spin-off Amon: The Darkside of the Devilman tells an alternate story of when Akira's body is taken over by Amon after losing his humanity.

Akira was created by Nagai following Toei Animation's approach of creating anti-heroes similar to the recently cancelled manga Demon Lord Dante. Nagai aimed in his take of the Devilman to portray the suffering of a demon, though focused more on the chaos of wars during the climax. Devilman Crybaby director Masaaki Yuasa was inspired to show his intimate relationship between Ryo and Miki Makimura as a love triangle, based on the impact reading Nagai's manga had on the director. Numerous voice actors have provided their work on Akira across the multiple animated versions of Devilman.

Critical response to Akira's characterization in the manga was mostly positive, although his original video animation persona was criticized for his relationship with the more antagonistic Ryo. His character in Devilman Crybaby was well-received for showcasing a more friendly and sensitive side to his personality.

== Creation and development ==
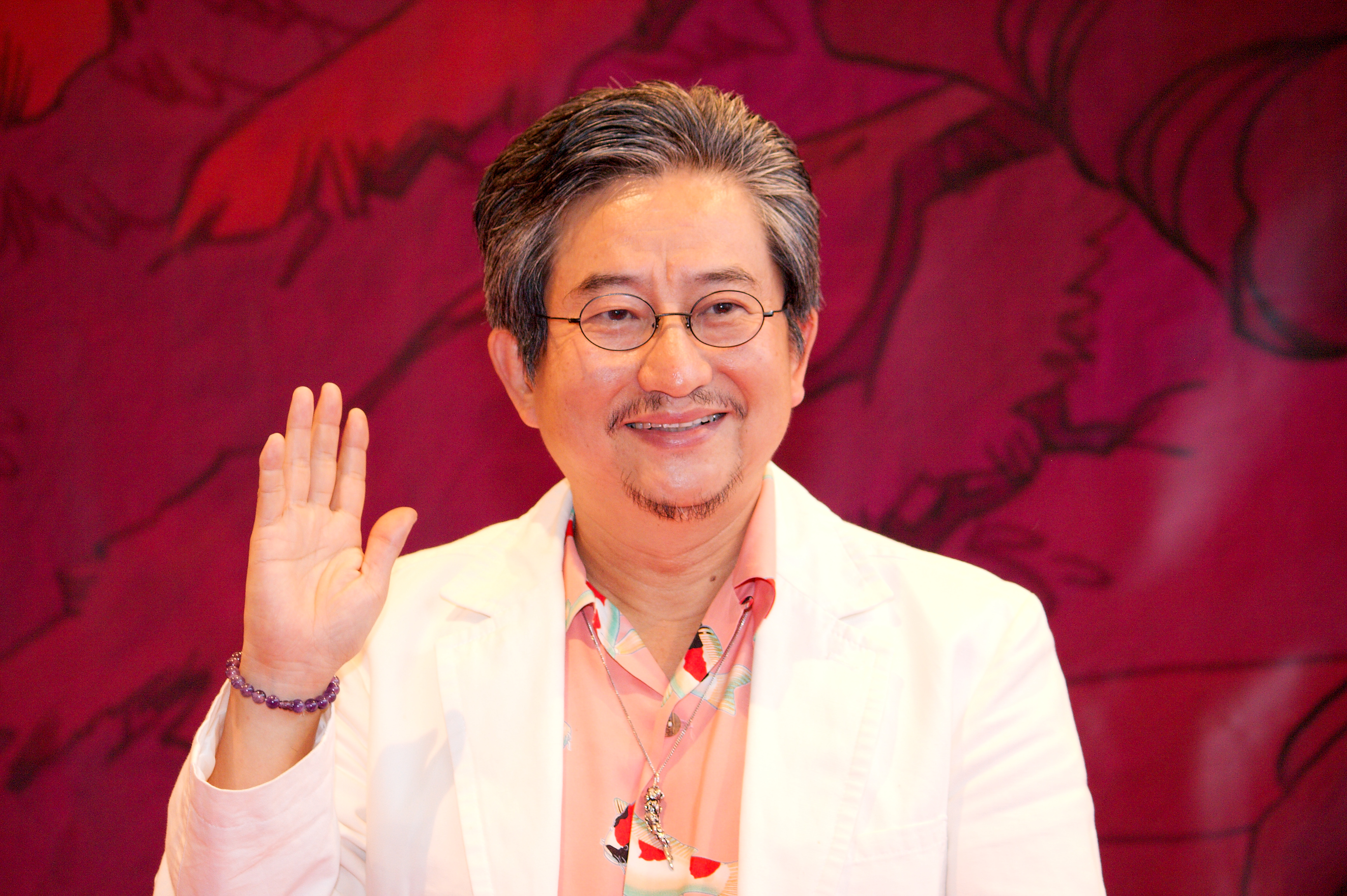
Manga author Go Nagai created Akira Fudo

Go Nagai created Akira Fudo following the cancellation of Demon Lord Dante. Toei Animation approached Nagai about turning Dante into a television series. The producers wanted certain elements toned down, and a more human-like demon created. Devilman was born as a result. Based on the audience's reaction, Nagai regarded Akira as someone who fights for survival. The television series takes a simplistic approach to Akira: "Evil vs. Evil, revolving around a hero. Evil takes over a human body, and to protect Miki, the girl he loves, the hero participates in the human world and battles evil". Meanwhile, the Akira from the manga took a different path. Nagai points out how Akira's manga persona suffers much more than the anime persona as the narrative progresses. Originally, Nagai designed Devilman to focus solely around Akira's transformation into a fighter, and the violence resulted from having this type of dark character. However, Nagai changed his mind about the themes of Devilman and refrained from using fighting in favor of an anti-war message. In regards to Akira's Devilman persona, Nagai did not aim to give him a "nightmare"-like design but ended up writing accidentally in a similar fashion to the mecha Mazinger Z. In retrospective, he has stated he finds Devilman's overall design to be weird and wonders why he made him like that. For the anime adaptation, a different design was provided for Devilman which consisted of underwears much to Nagai's disliking.

In the climax of the manga, Nagai wanted to show Akira at his lowest. The most notable example is when Akira discovers that Miki has been killed by humans and, in a fit of rage, Akira murders all of them, claiming that they were not humans due to not being able to consider humans as being capable of that degree of savagery. Through this narrative, Nagai wanted to show readers the chaos of wars regardless of which side one is on. Nagai says that the death of Miki had a major impact on the protagonist as it was "peace". This scene was done as Nagai thought that the hero saving the damsel-in-distress was too ordinary in manga.

Kenichi Takeshita directed the original video animation Amon. He wanted to explore Akira and Miki's relationship even after the latter's death through flashbacks, as he felt this relationship was the most important part of the narrative and most new viewers might require context as the OVA begins.

In regards to Crybaby, Masaaki Yuasa wanted to make both Akira and Ryo "cool". He described Akira as "steadfast in his resolve from beginning to end", which he wanted to contrast with Ryo's characterization. He also wanted to explore the love triangle between Akira, Ryo, and Miki ever since he read the original manga version of Devilman. This triangle was mostly seen through Ryo's character arc, as Ryo is unaware that Akira is important to him but as the story progresses he comes to find feelings for his ally. While Akira's characterization remains consistent in the plot, Yuasa wanted to contrast him with Ryo, who he felt was more important in this version based on his actions. Yuasa recalls reading the manga when was younger and was surprised at the final scene of Akira dying at Ryo's hands, and Ryo mourning his death. He also said that Miki's death scene, as seen through Akira's eyes, was one of the most important scenes he wanted to show in his series. Yuasa describes the character in Crybaby as: "Akira/Devilman is a crybaby, and at the end he is able to make Satan cry".

Ryoichi Tanaka was the first voice actor behind Akira, debuting in the 1972 anime. In the original video animation, Akira was voiced by Shō Hayami and Alan Marriott. In Amon, Akira is voiced by Shinji Takeda. Shintarō Asanuma and Bryce Papenbrook voices him in Cyborg 009 vs Devilman. The Akira of Crybaby was portrayed by Kōki Uchiyama in Japanese and Griffin Burns.

== Appearances ==
=== In Devilman ===
Akira's Devilman form as illustrated by Go Nagai

Akira Fudo, a shy teenager, lives with Miki Makimura and her family since his parents have died. Akira's best friend, Ryo Asuka, asks him for help since Ryo's late archaeologist father had claimed to discover the existence of demons hidden in society. Ryo contends that by seeking out demons and becoming like them, they can defeat them. Ryo takes Akira to a nightclub and attracts the attention of demons by drawing blood. In the ensuing melee, a demon known as Amon—the Lord of War, also called the "Beast of Hell"—consumes Akira. However, Akira manages to hold on to his own self-identity while assimilating Amon's character traits and powers, and becomes known as Devilman. Throughout the series, Devilman fights against many types of demons.

In time, the demons launch a world war against humans, which triggers mass panic and paranoia across the planet. Akira attempts to fight the demons by assembling together a band of other humans who have taken on demon-like qualities like himself. But when Ryo makes his true allegiance to the demon race known by lying and portraying Akira as normal demon possessing Akira's body, Miki's parents are arrested by the government. To make things worse, a crazed mob murders Miki and her brother and Akira sees their corpses on display. Enraged, Akira kills the humans in retribution. Akira goes on to fight Ryo, who reveals himself to be a disguised Satan. 20 years after the extinction of the human race, Akira engages Satan in battle, after which both of their army's are destroyed and he dies at the hands of Ryo. His dismembered body remains lies on a rock next to a mournful Satan as God's angels descend upon earth.

=== Other appearances ===
Go Nagai also wrote the manga Shin Devilman in which Akira and Ryo time-travel and encounter General Custer and Adolf Hitler. In the anime, Akira and his father are killed while mountain climbing in the Himalayas, and Devilman chooses Akira's body as a cover to disguise himself. As a result, Akira—now Devilman's host—is brought back to life, but gains a wild streak from the warrior's spirit that Devilman possesses. In the manga Amon: The Darkside of the Devilman, Akira, after witnessing the brutal murder of Miki, loses control of his humanity and allows Amon to take control of him. Akira later defeats Amon in combat and rejects Satan instead of fighting him. Another manga, Devilman: Strange Days, explores the armageddon and formation of Akira and Satan's sides. A live-action film was released in 2004, Devilman. Hisato Izaki played the role of Akira. Akira is also the main protagonist in the anime primarily based on the original manga, Devilman Crybaby.

At the end of Violence Jack, the protagonist, Jack, is revealed to be Akira Fudo himself after being resurrected by Ryo "Satan" Asuka, which is then followed by Akira about to continue his battle with Ryo.

In the crossover film Mazinger Z vs. Devilman (1973), both Akira and Koji Kabuto from Mazinger Z team up to face an army of demons led by Dr. Hell. Akira is tortured by the demons for being a traitor. However, Koji saves Akira, although Hell and Ashura escape alive. The movie ends with Koji and Akira on good terms.

In the original video animation series Cyborg 009 VS Devilman, the original Cyborg crew led by Dr. Gilmore find themselves in conflict with Akira, a strong demon believed to be in league with the war-profiteering terrorist organisation Black Ghost. Meanwhile, a bigger threat emerges when Dr. Adams, a Black Ghost scientist unleashes his new line of high teen Cyborg models against 009 and his friends.

== Reception ==
Akira Fudo has been a popular character. He was ranked fifth in Mania Entertainment's "10 Most Iconic Anime Heroes" written by Thomas Zoth, who commented that "Shonen manga developed a dark tone with Devilman's graphic violence, casual blasphemy, and theme of using evil itself to fight evil". A character designer from SNK admitted that Devilman was an influence in designing Kyo Kusanagi, the protagonist from the fighting series The King of Fighters '94. However, SNK artist Nona said he found it difficult to design Kyo as a heroic character, as he did not view Akira Fudo's portrayal fitting of a hero. Despite finding the manga's beginning weak due to Akira and Ryo's long discussions about demons, The Fandom Post praised the handling of Akira as it was different from other types of manga fighting series. The reviewer also found Akira's fighting scenes interesting due to the gruesome fate of his rivals.

Anime News Network initially referred to Akira as an appealing hero based on his kind demeanor, but criticized his relationship with Miki due to how she berates these traits. As a result, when Akira becomes a more violent person due to absorbing Amon, the review believes Nagai was expressing the idea of a man undergoing growth but still retaining his kind self. Although Akira and Ryo's relationship is not fully explored, the review felt there was a homoerotic tension between them that was interesting for readers. Jason Thompson from ANN stated that Akira's inability to save Miki and her family plays "like a visualization of a child's nightmare". Neon Genesis Evangelion director Hideaki Anno said the mecha Evangelion Unit 01 was influenced by Devilman. Anno said that Devilman's scary facial expressions were the basis for the mecha alongside Mazinger Z.

Critics also focused on Akira's portrayal in the animated versions of Devilman. The Anime Review praised his transformation into the Devilman based on the visuals provided by the studio. However, this review criticized Akira's relationship with Ryo, as Ryo comes across as planning a different agenda but Akira is never against him. ANN agreed in regards to long-awaited Devilman transformation but found Akira's motivation to fight devils simplistic. Nevertheless, he found Akira's fights to be well-developed. The Spinning Image enjoyed Akira's alternate take in the original video animation Amon: Apocalypse of Devilman due to how Akira's grief over the death of Miki causes him to lose his humanity and become possessed by his inner demon, Amon. Spinning Image enjoyed the amount of violence that occurs when Amon takes control of Akira and how in the climax the two split to decide who will be the dominant Devilman. Mania noted there was a major contrast between Akira and Amon's characterizations due to the latter lacking compassion for anybody, in contrast to the kind Akira who loses his composure during the armageddon. However, he criticized the lack of an ending in the OVA, as it ends with Akira facing Ryo, similar to the original manga.

The anime adaptation Devilman Crybaby provided a different portrayal of Akira which was discussed by the media. Kotaku enjoyed the larger focus on Akira and Ryo's closer relationship. This was further explored by how in the story Ryo/Satan discovers his affection towards Akira but starts grieving in the final scene when he realizes he has killed him, a scene not featured in the original manga. Bloody Disgusting liked the way Akira gradually lose his black-and-white view of morality when realizing there are demons who also have their own capacity for emotion and virtue he previously only associated with humans, just as humans have the same capacity for vice and savagery he associates with demons, which comes to a head when he is shown Ryo's true nature when the latter reveals to the world the existence of demons in an attempt to incite war between them. Akira's further relationship with Miki and her death at the hands of humans rather than demons were noted to be too tragic, as Akira is tortured by seeing the remains of her corpse. The Verge enjoyed Akira's characterization as both a capable fighter and a caring person when becoming a Devilman. Like Kotaku, Verge enjoyed the relationship Akira has with Ryo.

Anime News Network found Yuasa's take on Akira "strangely empathetic" due to Akira's sensitive demeanor, in contrast to Nagai's version in which he constantly cries, most notably when he starts understanding the demons. Griffin Burns's performance as Akira was praised. Salkowitz of Forbes described Akira as a too different person when becoming Devilman while still retaining his humanity.
