= List of Violence Jack volumes =

Violence Jack (バイオレンスジャック, Baiorensu Jakku) is a Japanese manga written and illustrated by Go Nagai and first serialized from July 22, 1973 to September 29, 1974 in Weekly Shōnen Magazine, published by Kodansha. The second ran in Monthly Shōnen Magazine, also published by Kodansha, from January 1977 to December 1978, with a few gaps between months. This two serializations of Kodansha were originally published in 7 volumes.

Five years later, the serialization continued this time in the magazine Weekly Manga Goraku, published by Nihonbungeisha, and ran from August 5, 1983 to March 23, 1990. This serialization originally produced 31 volumes in total.

In November 1, 1993, three years later after the end of the previous serialization, a special tankōbon called Violence Jack: Mao Korin Hen (バイオレンスジャック 魔王降臨編, baiorensu jakku maō kōrin hen) was released by Nihonbungeisha. Seven years later, in December 10, 2001 a special one-shot story, Violence Jack: Sengoku Majinden (バイオレンスジャック 戦国魔人伝, baiorensu jakku sengoku majinden), was published by Shueisha in a special edition of Weekly Young Jump, Bessatsu Young Jump #14. This story has not been re-printed or compiled yet.

In May 2005 (cover date 2005-05-13·20) the magazine Weekly Comic Bunch published by Coamix, the most recent serialization started, with Shin Violence Jack (新バイオレンスジャック, shin baiorensu jakku). This serialization was irregularly published, stopping in August 19, 2005 and restarting in November 2, 2007 to end in April 11, 2008 in number 17 of Weekly Comic Bunch. It was compiled in tankōbon by Media Factory in 2010.

In the February 2021 issue of Kodansha's Monthly Young Magazine, it was announced that a new manga series written by Yū Kinutani, titled Violence Jack 20XX, would begin serialization on February 19, 2021. As of September 20th, 2022, Violence Jack 20XX has been compiled into three tankōbon volumes.

== Volume list ==
The series has been published in tankōbon format several times. Because of the different serializations, each version is different from the previous. As such, only a few of them have the complete series (excluding Violence Jack: Sengoku Majinden and Shin Violence Jack which haven't been compiled yet).

=== Violence Jack ===
==== Original edition ====
- Kodansha (Part 1, 1974–1978)

Japanese release date	Vol.	Japanese ISBN
1974-04-20	1	406109243X
1974-04-20	2	4061092448
1974-08-15	3	4061092561
1977-06-20	4	4061094580
1977-10-30	5	4061094599
1978-05-25	6	4061735047
1978-12-15	7	4061735187

The Golden City Arc is excluded from this edition.

- Nihonbungeisha (Part 2, 1984–1990)

Japanese release date	Vol.	Japanese ISBN
1984-05-25	01	4537010177
1984-08-25	02	4537010185
1984-11-25	03	4537010193
1985-01-25	04	4537010207
1985-06-10	05	4537010568
1985-07-25	06	4537010576
1985-10-25	07	4537010584
1986-01-25	08	4537030011
1986-03-25	09	4537030135
1986-06-25	10	4537030313
1986-08-25	11	4537030445
1986-11-10	12	4537030593
1987-01-25	13	4537030739
1987-04-25	14	4537030917
1987-08-25	15	4537031158
1987-11-25	16	4537031336
1988-04-10	17	4537031468
1988-04-25	18	453703162X
1988-07-25	19	4537031786
1988-11-10	20	4537032006
1989-01-25	21	
1989-04-25	22	4537032359
1989-07-25	23	4537035447
1989-11-10	24	4537035684
1990-01-25	25	4537035846
1990-05-10	26	453703601X
1990-05-25	27	4537036060
1990-06-25	28	4537036117
1990-07-25	29	4537036168
1990-08-25	30	4537036222
1990-09-25	31	453703629X

==== Reprints and special editions ====
- Kodansha (1984–1985)

Japanese release date	Vol.	Japanese ISBN
1984-10-06	1	4061010913
1984-10-06	2	4061010921
1984-11-06	3	406101093X
1984-12-06	4	4061010948
1985-01-10	5	4061010956
1985-02-06	6	406101126X

- Nihonbungeisha (1989)

Japanese release date	Vol.	Japanese ISBN
1989-01-25	Evil Town	4537032138

A special tankōbon which contains the story arc Jigokugai, better known as Evil Town, released to coincide with the OVA release of the same name.

- Kodansha (Deluxe edition) (1990–1991)

Japanese release date	Vol.	Japanese ISBN
1990-07-17	1	406313301X
1990-08-17	2	4063133028
1990-09-17	3	4063133036
1990-10-17	4	4063133044
1990-11-17	5	4063133052
1990-12-14	6	4063133060
1991-01-07	7	4063133079

- Chuokouron-sha (Complete edition) (1996)

Japanese release date	Vol.	Japanese ISBN
1996-07-25	01	4120025640
1996-07-25	02	4120025659
1996-08-25	03	4120025667
1996-08-25	04	4120025675
1996-09-25	05	4120025683
1996-09-25	06	4120025691
1996-10-25	07	4120025705
1996-10-25	08	4120025713
1996-11-25	09	4120025721
1996-11-25	10	412002573X

This was the first edition to have the whole series up to that point, including all previous serializations. Each volume is around 900 pages long.

- Kodansha (Deluxe edition) (1998)

Japanese release date	Vol.	Japanese ISBN
1998-03-23	1	4063199126
1998-03-26	2	4063199134
1998-03-26	3	4063199142
1998-04-23	4	4063199290
1998-04-23	5	4063199304
1998-04-23	6	4063199312
1998-04-23	7	4063199320

- Chuokouron-sha (Complete edition) (1998)

Japanese release date	Vol.	Japanese ISBN
1998-04-18	01	412203129X
1998-04-18	02	4122031303
1998-05-18	03	4122031532
1998-05-18	04	4122031540
1998-06-18	05	4122031788
1998-06-18	06	4122031796
1998-07-18	07	4122032032
1998-07-18	08	4122032040
1998-08-18	09	412203227X
1998-08-18	10	4122032288
1998-09-18	11	4122032512
1998-09-18	12	4122032520
1998-10-18	13	4122032741
1998-10-18	14	412203275X
1998-11-18	15	4122032989
1998-11-18	16	4122032997
1998-12-18	17	4122033209
1998-12-18	18	4122033217

This edition has the whole series up to that point, including all previous serializations. Each volume is around 500 pages long.

- Shogakukan (2000)

Japanese release date	Vol.	Japanese ISBN
2000-07-21	01	4091093507
2000-07-21	02	4091093558
2000-08-04	03	4091093590
2000-08-25	04	4091093736
2000-09-08	05	4091093760
2000-09-15	06	4091093817
2000-09-22	07	409109385X
2000-10-20	08	4091094031
2000-10-27	09	4091094082
2000-11-03	10	4091094139

- Kodansha (Serial reproduction) (2018)

Japanese release date	Vol.	Japanese ISBN
2018-08-30	1	978-4-06-512897-8
2018-09-27	2	978-4-06-513105-3
2018-10-31	3	978-4-06-513788-8
2018-11-29	4	978-4-06-513968-4
2018-12-27	5	978-4-06-514017-8

=== Shin Violence Jack ===
- Media Factory (2010)

No.	Release date	ISBN
First	July 23, 2010	978-4-8401-3344-9
Last	July 23, 2010	978-4-8401-3345-6

=== Violence Jack 20XX ===
- Kodansha (2021–2023)

No.	Release date	ISBN
1	August 19, 2021	978-4-06-524353-4
1. Chapter 1; 2. Chapter 2; 3. Chapter 3; 4. Chapter 4; 5. Chapter 5
2	March 18, 2022	978-4-06-527054-7
6. Chapter 6; 7. Chapter 7; 8. Chapter 8; 9. Chapter 9; 10. Chapter 10; 11. Chapter 11
3	September 20, 2022	978-4-06-529064-4
12. Chapter 12; 13. Chapter 13; 14. Chapter 14; 15. Chapter 15; 16. Chapter 16; 17. Chapter 17
4	January 19, 2023	978-4-06-530421-1
12. Chapter 18; 13. Chapter 19; 14. Chapter 20; 15. Chapter 21; 16. Chapter 22; 17. Chapter 23

== See also ==
- Devilman
