= Devilman vs. Hades =

Japanese manga series

- First volume cover, featuring Akira Fudo

デビルマン対闇の帝王 (Debiruman Tai Yami no Teiō)
- Genre: Horror
- Manga
- Written by: Go Nagai
- Illustrated by: Team Moon
- Published by: Kodansha
- English publisher: NA: Seven Seas Entertainment
- Magazine: Monthly Young Magazine
- Original run: November 14, 2012 – July 9, 2014
- Volumes: 3
- icon

Devilman vs. Hades (Japanese: デビルマン対闇の帝王, Hepburn: Debiruman Tai Yami no Teiō) is a Japanese manga series written by Go Nagai and illustrated by Team Moon. It is part of the Devilman franchise created by Nagai. The manga ran in Kodansha's Monthly Young Magazine from November 2012 to July 2014, with its chapters collected in three tankōbon volumes.

== Publication ==
Written by Go Nagai and illustrated by Team Moon, Devilman vs. Hades was serialized in Kodansha's Monthly Young Magazine from November 14, 2012, to July 9, 2014. Kodansha collected its chapters in three tankōbon, released from June 6, 2013, to September 5, 2014.

In North America, Seven Seas Entertainment licensed the manga in 2017. The three volumes were released from March 13 to November 27, 2018.

=== Volumes ===
No.	Original release date	Original ISBN	English release date	English ISBN
1	June 6, 2013	978-4-06-382315-8	March 13, 2018	978-1-626927-39-1
2	January 6, 2014	978-4-06-382398-1	August 7, 2018	978-1-626928-24-4
3	September 5, 2014	978-4-06-382398-1	November 27, 2018	978-1-626929-16-6

== Reception ==
Mike Dent from Otaku USA called the first volume an "essentially nonstop action" and praised Team Moon's art work, stating that the character designs "stay true to the classics" of the original Devilman, but adding "distinctive new touches to great effect".
