= Devilman Saga =

Japanese manga series by Go Nagai

- First tankōbon volume cover

デビルマンサーガ (Debiruman Sāga)
- Manga
- Written by: Go Nagai
- Published by: Shogakukan
- Imprint: Big Comics Special
- Magazine: Big Comic
- Original run: December 25, 2014 – March 10, 2020
- Volumes: 13
- icon

Devilman Saga (Japanese: デビルマンサーガ, Hepburn: Debiruman Sāga) is a Japanese manga series written and illustrated by Go Nagai. It is part of the Devilman franchise created by Nagai. The manga ran in Shogakukan's Big Comic from December 2014 to March 2020, with its chapters collected in thirteen tankōbon volumes.

== Synopsis ==
Set in 2025, the story follows Yuki Fudo, a roboticist working on a mural depicting humanity's past and a demon armour found in Antarctica. He encounters his childhood friend, Ryo Asuka, who is also involved in the project. There, he meets a pilot named Tsubasa. However, after Tsubasa bonds with one of the demon armours, Sirene, she loses control. Yuki intervenes, bonding with the demon armour Amon. After stopping Sirene, the project's organizers change their plans: to defeat all demons bonded to humans. Since Yuki and Tsubasa can control their demon state, they are assigned to defeat all the demons.

== Publication ==
Written and illustrated by Go Nagai, Devilman Saga was serialized in Shogakukan's Big Comic from December 25, 2014, to March 10, 2020. Shogakukan collected its chapters in thirteen tankōbon volumes, released from June 30, 2015, to May 29, 2020.

=== Volumes ===
No.	Japanese release date	Japanese ISBN
1	June 30, 2015	978-4-09-187069-8
2	November 30, 2015	978-4-09-187400-9
3	April 28, 2016	978-4-09-187676-8
4	September 30, 2016	978-4-09-189273-7
5	February 28, 2017	978-4-09-189458-8
6	August 30, 2017	978-4-09-189664-3
7	January 30, 2018	978-4-09-189841-8
8	May 30, 2018	978-4-09-860014-4
9	October 30, 2018	978-4-09-860164-6
10	February 28, 2019	978-4-09-860272-8
11	September 30, 2019	978-4-09-860503-3
12	February 28, 2020	978-4-09-860584-2
13	May 29, 2020	978-4-09-860667-2
