= Amon: The Darkside of the Devilman =

Japanese manga series by Yu Kinutani

- First tankōbon volume cover

AMONデビルマン黙示録 (Amon Debiruman Mokushiroku)
- Manga
- Written by: Go Nagai
- Illustrated by: Yu Kinutani
- Published by: Kodansha
- Magazine: Monthly Magazine Z
- Original run: August 1999 – April 2004
- Volumes: 6
- Original video animation

Amon: Apocalypse of Devilman
- Directed by: Kenichi Takeshita
- Written by: Ritsuko Hayasaka
- Music by: Mangahead; Takeshi Kobayashi
- Studio: Studio Live
- Released: May 24, 2000
- Runtime: 45 minutes
- Manga

Devilman Mokushiroku: Strange Days
- Written by: Go Nagai
- Illustrated by: Yu Kinutani
- Published by: Kodansha
- Magazine: Monthly Magazine Z
- Published: 2005
- Volumes: 1
- icon

Amon: The Darkside of the Devilman (AMON デビルマン黙示録, AMON Debiruman Mokushiroku; sometimes translated as Amon: The Apocalypse of the Devilman) is a Japanese manga series by Yu Kinutani, based on the Devilman manga originally created by Go Nagai. The first tankōbon volume was published on January 21, 2000, and the final volume was released on April 24, 2004.

== Plot ==
Fear runs rampant throughout Tokyo with the revelation that demons in fact exist amongst us. Paranoia and the darker side of humanity boils onto the streets as people turn on one another, suspecting that anyone could in fact be a demon hiding in human appearance. Amidst the growing tensions, tragedy strikes Akira causing his mind to snap. Retreating into his subconsciousness, this allows his devilish alter-ego Amon to break free from Akira's cage of flesh and wreak havoc on both humans and demons alike.

Amon: The Darkside of the Devilman is an alternate setting to the last chapters of the original Devilman manga. Where in the original, Devilman faces Satan after seeing his slain lover Miki Makimura's severed head, Amon sees Akira lose control of himself, and due to his sadness and depression from not being able to protect Miki, allows Amon to gain control of Akira and his powers again.

In Volume 2, we start to see the origins of both Amon, and Sirène, and see more of Earth under the demons' rule.

== Characters ==
- Amon: Known as the Lord of War, is one of the most powerful demons known, and considered one of the greatest warriors of Hell. Lover to the demon, Sirene. Originally "trapped" within Akira Fudo, when Amon attempted to possess Akira, but due to Akira's pure heart, Amon loses control and remains sealed within Akira, giving Akira complete control over Amon's powers. He appears in the anime as a tall and red humanoid demon with black fur and chiropteran wings on his head and back (possibly to symbolize the rivalry between Amon and Satan). He is defeated and re-merged by Akira in one-on-one combat after being savagely beaten by a flurry of right-hand punches.
- Akira Fudo: The main protagonist of Devilman. He maintains the same role as he did in the original Devilman, but his appearance is more intimidating than in the original. After witnessing the brutal murder of his lover Miki, Akira snaps and allows Amon to take control of him. Akira later defeats Amon in combat and rejects Satan by walking past him instead of fighting him.
- Sirène: Amon's lover and the main protagonist of the Cretaceous Era arc.
- Ryo Asuka (Satan): Leader of all demons. Wields incredible psychic powers, among other abilities. Satan is in love with Akira Fudo (based on the friendship gained as Ryo Asuka, Satan's human form). He appears as a twelve winged seraph. The story ends with the two meeting face to face, with Akira walking past him while Ryo looks back at him sadly.

== Media ==
=== Manga ===
The manga was originally published in the Kodansha's Monthly Magazine Z, from August 1999 issue to April 2004 issue.

No.	Japanese release date	Japanese ISBN
1	January 21, 2000	4-06-349008-4
1. kyōma sairin (兇魔再臨); 2. shi o matoi shimono (死を纏いしもの); 3. yottsu no ikimono... (4つの生き物...); 4. ni hiki no kemono (2匹の獣); 5. horobi no wazawai (滅びの災い); 6. saigo no shinpan (最後の審判)
2	December 22, 2000	4-06-349040-8
1. kotonaru mono (異なる者); 2. horobi no nichi (滅びの日); 3. gishiki (儀式); 4. kaikō (邂逅); 5. akaki tsuki no namida (赤き月の涙); 6. kuroi tsubasa shiroi tsubasa (黒い翼・白い翼); 7. kemono no kokuin (獣の刻印)
3	September 21, 2001	4-06-349066-1
1. ōinaru to (大いなる都); 2. fūin no tobira (封印の扉); 3. chi o horobosu mono domo (地を滅ぼす者ども); 4. ten kara no koe (天からの声); 5. sabaka reshi to (裁かれし都); 6. yorube nakimono (よるべなきもの)
4	August 23, 2002	4-06-349104-8
1. sabaki shisha no matsuei (裁きし者の末裔); 2. inochi no mizu no izumi (命の水の泉); 3. tsubasa aru mono (翼ある者); 4. uruwashiki mukuro (麗しき骸); 5. nasu bekikoto (成すべきこと); 6. chi ni somarishi tenshi tachi (血に染まりし天使たち); 7. shūen no toki (終宴の時); 8. eien naru mono... (永遠なる者...)
5	July 23, 2003	4-06-349136-6
1. yūkyū no hajimari (悠久の始まり); 2. akumu no omokage (悪夢の面影); 3. shinobi yoru kon ki kage (忍び寄る昏き影); 4. yami no naka kara (闇の中から); 5. yojire shi kage (捩れし影); 6. meimō no rengoku (迷妄の煉獄); 7. uruwashiki zetsubō (麗しき絶望)
6	April 23, 2004	4-06-349169-2
1. akuma ka... ningen ka... (悪魔か...人間か...); 2. tada ai yueni (ただ愛ゆえに); 3. kanzen naru akuma (完全なる悪魔); 4. kadone no yami (カドネの闇); 5. ningen soshite akuma (人間そして悪魔); 6. mezame shi kemono (目覚めし獣); 7. saigo no koku, hajimari no koku (最後の刻、始まりの刻)

==== Devilman Mokushiroku: Strange Days ====
A sequel, titled Devilman Mokushiroku: Strange Days (デビルマン黙示録 STRANGE DAYS)), was also published in the same magazine in 2005.

No.	Japanese release date	Japanese ISBN
1	July 22, 2005	4-06-349214-1

=== OVA adaptation ===
On May 24, 2000, a loose adaptation of the first volume of Amon: The Darkside of the Devilman was released. Being based on volume 1 of the manga (no other volumes were released at the time), it is much shorter than the manga, and branches off in an entirely different direction shortly after Amon gains control of Akira Fudo at the end of volume 1.

In the OVA, fear runs rampant throughout Tokyo as paranoia grips the population who believe that demons exist among them. Akira is seen coming to the aid of Miko and Yumi, two female members of his team of demon hunters. Later, at Miki's home, her brother Tare watches a live broadcast video footage of Akira transforming into Devilman. Before he can tell Miki, a group of vigilante demon hunters corner and kill him. When Miki comes down the stairs, she is attacked and decapitated. Ryo Asuka goes on TV and stirs unrest and violence by warning people to be vigilant against demons. Later, Akira sees the group of vigilantes with Miki's head. He then loses control and transforms into Devilman and kills them all in a sea of blood. Akira is later informed by Yumi that the Devilman Army scout troops are combating a squadron of demons led by Seylos.

When Akira arrives, Selos gives Akira the option to join his army or die. Having lost control, Akira releases a wave of energy which destroys the building, with Amon left in his place. Selos' demons attack him, but Amon's overwhelming strength immediately grants him the upper hand, and he effortlessly defeats them one after the other. During a pause in the fight, Amon finds Yumi trapped under a piece of masonry. After seemingly rescuing her from the wreckage, he then suddenly takes a bite in her, eating on her and leaves her body in half while Seylos' remaining demons and Miko look on in terror. He then confronts Selos. The two demons engage in a citywide titanic battle but Amon is far too strong and kills Seylos after punching through his body. Amon then finds and attacks Satan who tells him that Akira still exists. Amon later confronts Akira in a wasteland. Akira then transforms into Devilman and they fight, but Amon seems far stronger and savagely beats Devilman. Semi-conscious, Devilman's mind drifts back to his life as Akira and time with Miki which gives him the strength to retaliate and defeat Amon. Devilman then fights back and delivers a rapid-fire barrage of right-hand punches which finally subdues Amon and ultimately finishing him off with a final blow, resulting in Akira successfully regaining control. The OVA ends with Akira Fudo and Ryo Asuka (who is Satan in his human form) facing each other before Akira begins to slowly walk past him.

==== Staff of Amon: Apocalypse of Devilman (2000) ====
- Creature Design: Yasushi Nirasawa
- Ending Theme Song Performance: Me no Mae no Tsuzuki (目のまえのつづき) by MANGAHEAD
- Voice Cast:
  - Shinji Takeda (Akira Fudo/Devilman)
  - Atsuko Enomoto (Miki Makimura)
  - Tomokazu Seki (Ryo Asuka/Satan)
  - Akio Otsuka (Amon)
  - Kazuki Yao (Seylos)
  - Mitsuki Saiga (Psycho Jenny)
  - Motoko Kumai (Tare Makimura)
  - Rie Tanaka (Miko)
  - Tomoko Kawakami (Yumi)
  - Hirotaka Suzuoki (Zubo)
