= Demon Lord Dante =

Manga and anime series by Go Nagai

- Cover of the second volume of the Italian release of Mao Dante, as published by d/visual in 2002

魔王ダンテ (Maō Dante)
- Genre: Horror, supernatural
- Manga
- Written by: Go Nagai
- Published by: Kodansha
- Magazine: Bokura Magazine
- Original run: January 1971 – June 1971
- Volumes: 3
- Manga

The True Demon Lord Dante
- Written by: Aki Fūga
- Published by: Kodansha
- Magazine: Comic Ran
- Original run: 1994 – 1998
- Volumes: 8
- Manga
- Written by: Go Nagai
- Published by: Kodansha
- Magazine: Magazine Z
- Original run: March 2002 – January 2004
- Volumes: 4
- Anime television series
- Directed by: Kenichi Maejima
- Produced by: Hiroshi Murano
- Written by: Shōzō Uehara
- Music by: Hiroshi Motokura
- Studio: Magic Bus
- Licensed by: NA: Discotek Media
- Original network: AT-X
- Original run: August 31, 2002 – November 23, 2002
- Episodes: 13
- icon

Demon Lord Dante (Japanese: 魔王ダンテ, Hepburn: Maō Dante) is a manga series written and illustrated by Go Nagai. The series tells the story of Ryo Utsugi, a student who finds himself in the body of an ancient demon known as Dante and sees himself in the middle of a conflict between God and the devils. Nagai's main influence to create the work was Gustave Doré's illustrations of Dante's Divine Comedy. The series challenged the traditional view of God as good and Devil as bad and was created to provoke the critics of his previous works.

During 1971, Nagai wrote the original Demon Lord Dante manga, which was published in Kodansha's Bokura Magazine. The series ran from January to June, but it ended prematurely because of the magazine discontinuation. In 2002, the manga was officially revived by Nagai, and during the same year a 13-episode anime adaption was created and broadcast in Japan by AT-X. The anime was released in North America in DVD format by Geneon Entertainment in 2004 and re-released by Discotek Media in 2016.

== Plot ==
=== 1971 manga ===
Ryo Utsugi (宇津木 涼, Utsugi Ryō) is a high school student who lives with his sister Saori (沙織) and his parents. He has been repeatedly having nightmares about demons. Because of this, he cannot sleep well the day before he goes on a trip into the mountains. There, Ryo follows a voice who proclaims himself to be "Dante, the King of Devils" and ends up falling from a cliff. As he falls, he unconsciously teleports to the Himalayas with psychic powers. After Dante explains he was Judas Iscariot when he was a human, he controls Ryo's mind to break free from the ice prison and kills Ryo.

Unaware of Dante's resurrection, a group of Satanists kidnaps a female student to sacrifice her to revive Dante in a Black Mass. God's Association (神の結社, Kami no Kessha), a religious group secretly led by Ryo's father, Kosuke (康介), attack the ritual, but Dante arrives and kills them. Dante flies to Nagoya, where he is confronted by the Army after he crushes buildings and kills people. Ryo notices his consciousness is in Dante's body, but he still kills the Army's soldiers. Then the demon Zenon (ゼノン) appears and fights Dante. Zenon is defeated but before dying he says he wanted to fight God but he was afraid to do it. Zenon trusts Dante this task, saying Dante should assemble a demon army with the power of Satan and be careful about Adam and Eve.

The other day Ryo returns home in his human form and goes to school. When a student is murdered, Ryo suspects it was a demon's deed and wonders if the culprit is himself. But at night he sees a demon attacking a human and kills it by transforming himself into a half-demon, half-human figure. During the same night, a Medusa-like demon appears in the city. At school, another student, Sosuke Oshiba (大柴壮介, Ōshiba Sōsuke), says he fights demons and that he wants Ryo to be his partner. As Sosuke shows a demon to Ryo and tortures it, Ryo feels compassion for the demon. Unsettled, Ryo leaves the place and meets Medusa (メドゥーサ, Medūsa), who takes him into that past using time travel.

Medusa reveals Ryo that God is an energy-based monster who once destroyed the high-tech Sodom where they lived as lovers. God wanted Earth inhabitants' bodies but as Dante refused to comply with it, God attacked the city. Dante, Medusa, and some others turned into demons by absorbing God's power. When Dante pilots a powerful jet fighter in an attempt to buy time for his friends to escape, he is grabbed by a Pteranodon. Careening into a nearby Tyrannosaurus rex, Dante was left open to be consumed in God's fires, causing him to be fused with his jet and the two prehistoric reptiles to create his current form. Later in a confrontation with God at the Himalayas, Dante was sealed in ice.

God also attacked Gomorrah and its survivors, the last actual humans in existence, became the Satanists. After this, God divided himself into pieces and took residence in apes that evolved into the current "human" race. Defeated by God and sealed in the Himalayas, Dante transferred his human body and soul to Judas Iscariot and Ryo Utsugi respectively to be reborn two thousand years later. The story ends as Dante reassembles his demon army and is prepared to destroy humankind.

=== 2002–2004 reboot ===
19-year old scientist prodigy Dante Luther (ダンテ・ルーサー, Dante Rūsā) works as a physicist and weapons engineer under the supervision of Medusa and lives with his sister Olga (オルガ) and his parents in Sodom. One day, the nation is attacked by energy-based, psychic creatures from outer space that call themselves "gods". To fight back, Dante, Medusa, Satan (サタン), Lucifer (ルシファー, Rushifā), Asmodeus (アスモデウス, Asumodeusu), and Beelzebub (ベルゼブブ, Beruzebubu) use super-weapons called "demons" that magnify its user mental energy. The demons' users are weaker than the gods, but when they are closer to death they become actual demons as they merge themselves with their weapons as a side effect of gods' attacks. Other humans become demons and the Earthlings start to win over the gods. However, the gods divide themselves and possess human bodies to fight. In the ensuing war, the demons are defeated because Dante hesitates to kill Eve, a giant made out of human bodies, when he sees Olga is part of her. But Dante's soul is not destroyed and he promises to return to defeat the gods.

Twenty thousand years later, in 2010, high school student Ryo Utsugi is having nightmares about a woman, a city being destroyed by flames and a demon trapped in ice, while Medusa is reborn and is trying to communicate with Dante through Satanist rituals. Meanwhile, a religious group called "God's Soul" (神の魂, Kami no Tamashi), secretly commanded by Ryo's father, Kosuke, is trying to revive the gods and is hunting demons through a division named "Guardian Justice" (ガーディアン・ジャスティス, Gādian Jasutisu). One day, Ryo intervenes in an assault of Guardian Justice; in response its leader, Sosuke Oshiba, who is also Ryo's schoolmate and kendo club's captain, does a demonstration to Ryo of the existence of demons by killing one. Although Ryo feels a pain in his chest when the creature is killed, he joins the group.

Medusa infiltrates Ryo's school as a teacher named Saori Medo (女洞沙織, Medō Saori) to make him remember he is Dante. She also helps the Satanists to kidnap Ryo's sister, Aya (彩), whom they want to sacrifice in a Black Mass. When Medusa is captured by God's Soul, Ryo helps her when she convinces him she is the only one who can save Aya and tells him he is Dante's reincarnation. Medusa and Ryo arrive in the Black Mass just as the Guardian Justice attacks the ritual and prevent Aya's sacrifice. Amidst the conflict, the Satanists summon a mindless demon Dante, who cannot distinguish between friends or foes and eventually eats Ryo. Ryo reappears on Demon Lord Dante's forehead and realizes he controls its body. Shocked, Ryo denies being a demon and releases himself from Dante's body, which makes Dante disappear and transform Ryo into a human-like demon. He returns home after being defeated by traitor demon Zenon but when footage of him in Dante's body is shown on television he flees from his home.

Five years later, a worldwide war between demons and gods started. Ryo is hidden in a refugee camp as he does not want to get involved, but Zenon attacks him and Dante recovers his gigantic body during the fight. Medusa re-encounters Satan and Lucifer and they find Ryo, who recovers Dante's memories with the help of Satan. When Dante's return is known by God's Soul members, they reunite their thirteen apostles to revive Adam and Eve. Aya, now a commander in the fight against the demons, is chosen to have the body of Eve. In the final fight, Aya discovers she is Olga's reincarnation and helps Dante to defeat the gods. The gods leave the humans' bodies and return to space as the demons become the sole inhabitants of Earth.

=== 2002 anime ===
A Satan cult, whose leaders are demons in human form, begin to hold a series of Black Masses in hopes of reviving an ancient demon known as Dante. Ryo Utsugi, a high school student, begins experiencing strange nightmares and premonitions. Soon after, Ryo's sister, Saori, is kidnapped by these cultists for use in one of their sacrificial ceremonies. Ryo's premonitions guide him to the ritual and he saves her right before it is disrupted by a group of militant Christians. Believing that Ryo's new-found powers could awaken Dante, the cultists orchestrate a chain of events to lead Ryo to the mountains, where he discovers a portal that takes him into the deepest parts of the Himalayas, the heart of Dante's prison.

Using telekinetic powers, Dante uses Ryo to free himself from his ice prison before eating him alive. Meanwhile, the cultists capture an unnamed princess and kill her by successfully performing the Black Mass used to summon Dante for the second and final time, though her body was not found anywhere. However, Dante's consciousness has been taken over by Ryo who, upon seeing his new form, is blinded by rage and rampages through Nagoya. His frenzy ends upon encountering Zenon, an old friend of Dante, who, becoming enslaved by God, was forced to fight and thereby be killed by Dante. Eventually, Ryo encounters the leader of the cultists, who tells him that his birth family was killed in a car accident and his adopted father, who is both a doctor and the leader of a rival cult dedicated to God, was the one who saved him, revealing Saori to be unrelated by blood. In retaliation to Dante's release, the followers of God unleash the Four Devil Kings (悪魔四天王), who wreak havoc on the city by draining the life force of its inhabitants in order to gain Dante's attention. Ryo also meets the demon Medusa, who assumes the form of a supermodel named Saeko Kodai (古代 冴子, Kodai Saeko).

As the story progresses, it is revealed that Ryo is a reincarnation of Dante when he was human. It turned out that Sodom and Gomorrah were a futuristic utopia under the rule of Satan. However, God, an energy-based being, came to Earth and demanded to use the people of Sodom as hosts for its power. When Satan and the people refuse to comply, God proceeds to use animals as vessels to destroy Sodom, an action that resulted in many of its occupants turned into their current demonic forms from being exposed to the residual energies. The survivors of Gomorrah, the last actual humans in existence, became the Satanists who allied themselves with the demons to fight God who took residence in apes and jump-started their evolution into the current human race. Near the end of the conflict that followed, as Satan both sealed himself within another dimension, Dante transferred his human body and soul to Judas Iscariot and Ryo Utsugi respectively to keep fighting after he was sealed. With Ryo finally regaining his memories as Dante while in Sodom and Gomorrah, he teams up with the cultists and plans to finally take vengeance upon God for his sins while releasing Satan.

However, God decides to jumpstart the Apocalypse, gathering the pieces of itself within humans to reform, as the humans ultimately destroy themselves, while taking Saori to make her the ultimate weapon under his control to smite all the demons. After Dante/Ryo succeeds in destroying the first form which was a large serpent featuring Adam and Eve, she transforms into an angelic knight with Saori's body placed in its forehead. She battles Ryo fiercely before managing to break God's hold over her. They then reunite as Adam and Eve, their embrace destroying the world and scattering God back into space to find another world to repeat the cycle of conflict among its native lifeforms. Afterwards, the anime ends with its final scene which shows them holding hands and walking in a prehistoric version of the Garden of Eden.

== Publication ==
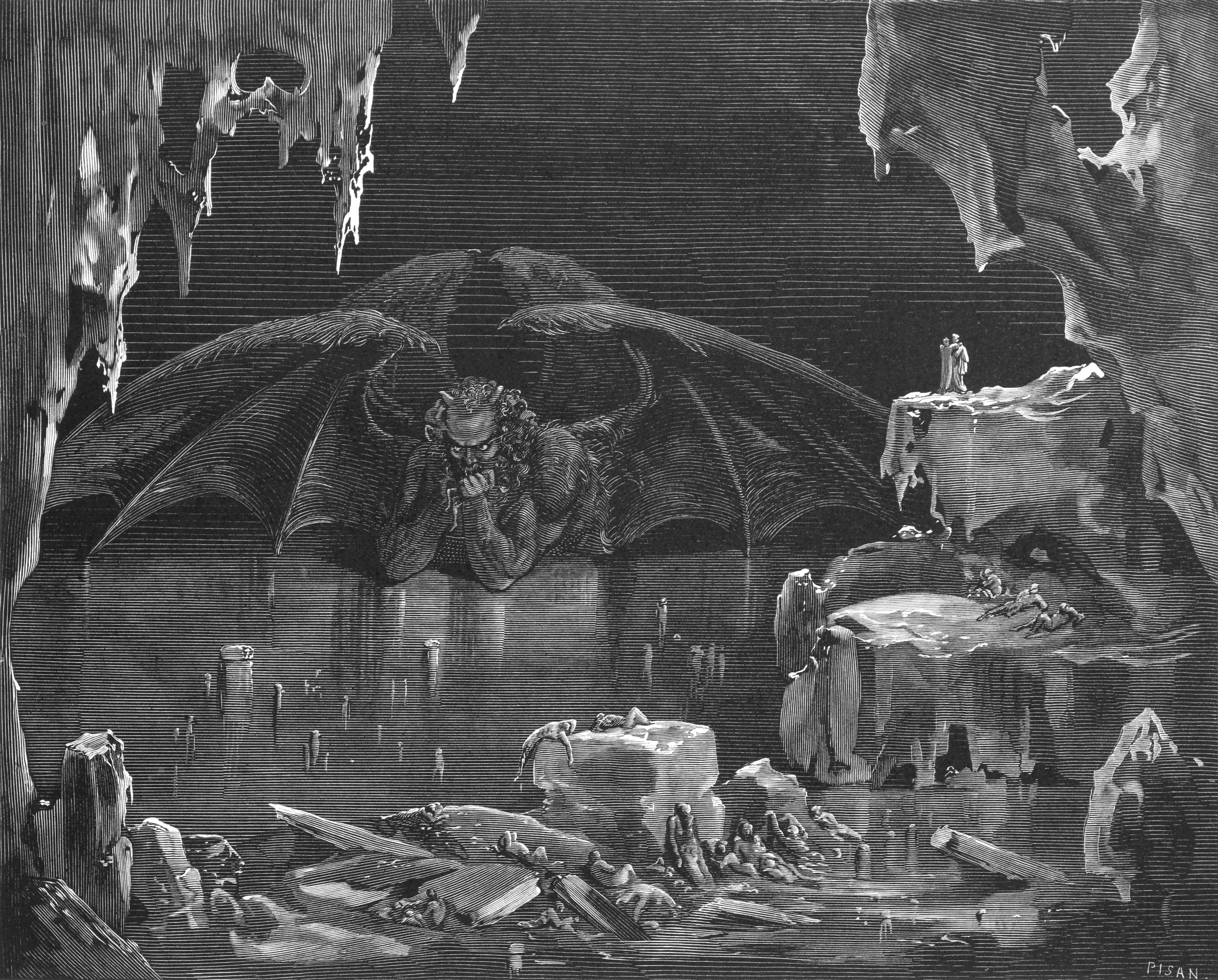
Gustave Doré's illustration of Lucifer in Inferno was an inspiration for the series

The concept of Demon Lord Dante is inspired by Nagai's contact with a Gustave Doré-illustrated version of Dante's Divine Comedy. He found particularly likeable the figure of Lucifer in Inferno as "huge creature stuck in the ice in the center of the Earth". (Note: In the original, in Italian, "Una creatura immensa, bloccata tra i ghiacci al centro della terra".) He started to think about it in the end of the 1960s, because of the critics he was receiving from his precedent works. His most popular manga until then, Harenchi Gakuen (1968–1972), an erotic comedy set in a school, featured satirical critics to the Japanese scholar system and society, and was campaigned against by parent-teacher associations across Japan. As a response, with Demon Lord Dante, Nagai tried to subvert the traditional view of God and Devil to provocate "the keepers of the standard". As such, Demon Lord Dante "represents the struggle between the monster and the standard seen through the eyes of the former", as a pair of literary critics put it. (Note: In the original, in Italian, "Nagai afferma che Devilman e Mao Dante, l'opera incompiuta che lo precede (1971), basati sul rovesciamento della visione tradizionale in cui il Dio del Bene si oppone e trionfa contro le infernali schiere del Male, li immaginò e creò in seguito agli attacchi che i suoi precedenti fumetti (per esempio commedie scholastiche a sfondo blandamente erotico ) avevano subìto da associazone di genitori e benpensanti, dalle istituzioni, dalle autorità, dai custodi della Norma, del criterio di chiò che è giusto e sbagliato. Mao Dante è la lotta fra il Monstro e la Norma vista con gli occhi del primo".) Through the manga, Nagai wanted to show that good is not always the "good guys" and evil could be the right path.

The manga was materialized during 1971 through its serialization in Kodansha's Bokura Magazine from the January issue to the June issue. However, the magazine went defunct and the story ended incomplete. The first collected version of the series was published by Asahi Sonorama in three volumes released between June and July 1973. It would be reprinted twice by the same publisher—in a three-volume edition in 1976 and in a two-volume version in 1984. Chuokoron-Shinsha also republished the manga twice; in a single-volume in 1991 and in a two-volume reprint in 1995. It was also rereleased by Kodansha into two volumes in 1999 and into three volumes in 2002. In 2018, as part of the 50th anniversary of Nagai as an artist, the series was republished into two volumes by Shogakukan as Maō Dante: The First in a version meant to be closer to the original Bokura Magazine serialization. The first volume was released on August 27, 2018, while the second one was published on September 19, 2018.

Nagai started a reboot series to complete the unfinished story in the March 2002 issue of Kodansha's Magazine Z. It was divided into four arcs, each one of them being released as a collected volume in June 2002, December 2002, July 2003, and January 2004, respectively. Kamiryaku-hen (神略編) was serialized until the June 2002 issue; Genma-hen (現魔編) was published between July 2002 and March 2003; Madō-hen (魔道編) from April to July 2003; and Kamima Taisen-hen (神魔大戦編) between September 2003 and January 2004 issues. The series was also made available as Shin Maō Dante (新魔王ダンテ; lit. The New Demon Lord Dante) by eBook Japan through its site on August 9, 2013.

== Related works ==
Akira Fūga wrote a remake titled Shin Maō Dante (真・魔王ダンテ; lit. The True Demon Lord Dante) that was published under LEED's Kyofu no Yakata print. The series was collected into eight volumes published between 1994 and 1996, and it features new characters and Boy's Love.

A crossover between Demon Lord Dante and Getter Robo G was created by Nagai and serialized in Akita Shoten's Monthly Champion Red from August 10, to December 19, 2011. The series was published in a single collected volume on March 19, 2012, and it reenacts the events of Dante's resurrection with Getter Robo G's Ryoma Nagare in the place of Ryo Utsugi.

== Anime adaptation ==
| No. | Episode title | | First airing |
| No. | English | Japanese | First airing |
|---|---|---|---|
| 1 | Nightmare | Akumu (悪夢) | 2002-08-31 |
| 2 | Ritual | Gishiki (儀式) | 2002-09-07 |
| 3 | Resurrection | Fukkatsu (復活) | 2002-09-14 |
| 4 | Madness | Kyōran (狂乱) | 2002-09-21 |
| 5 | Fate | Unmei (宿命) | 2002-09-28 |
| 6 | Herald | Yochō (予兆) | 2002-10-05 |
| 7 | Encounter | Kaikō (邂逅) | 2002-10-12 |
| 8 | Disbelief | Fushin (不信) | 2002-10-19 |
| 9 | Labyrinth | Makyū (魔宮) | 2002-10-26 |
| 10 | Encroachment | Kamiryaku (神略) | 2002-11-02 |
| 11 | Saori | Saori (沙織) | 2002-11-09 |
| 12 | The Unbreakable Weapon | Adversity (窮地, Kyūchi) | 2002-11-16 |
| 13 | Consummation | End (終焉, Shūen) | 2002-11-23 |

On May 1, 2000, an issue of the manga was released as an original video animation through VHS. Produced by Maxell e-cube and distributed by Art Port, the release format was called "manga video", which consists of the original manga images with sound effects and dubbing added. It was followed by an anime television series produced by Magic Bus and broadcast by AT-X in 2002. Most voice actors of the "manga video" were replaced for the anime, except for Susumu Chiba who played the role of Ryo Utsugi. As the manga was still unfinished, Nagai allowed the anime staff to create its own end. Nagai also commented the thirty-year gap between the manga publication and an anime adaptation was because the audience was not prepared for it.

Directed by Kenichi Maejima and written by Shozo Uehara, the television series ran for 13 episodes from August 31, to November 23, 2002. The episodes were later released in seven DVD compilations between November 25, 2002, and January 25, 2003 by Ken Media. The anime opening theme was "Release Your Mind" by Tomokazu Seki, while the ending theme was "Heal" by Asuka Kuroki. These theme musics and the score music that was composed by Hiroshi Motokura were included in a 25-track original soundtrack released by HiBoom on September 4, 2002.

In August 2002, even before the Japanese premiere, Media Blasters licensed the television series. However, the company dropped it the following year, and it was Geneon Entertainment who brought the anime to the North American home media market. The series was released in four bilingual DVD volumes between May and November 2004. The American release altered some scenes regarding its nudity and graphically violent content. Following the 2007 closure of Geneon Entertainment, the company discontinued their home video distribution. In 2016, Discotek Media relicensed the series and released it into a DVD box set on August 30. In September 2019, Crunchyroll added the anime to its streaming catalog.

== Reception and legacy ==
Nagai's biggest success in his early career, Demon Lord Dante attracted many people because of its gruesome contents. It even aroused a Toei Animation producer's attention, but the piece was considered too violent to be adapted for television. Still interested in pursuing a similar concept, Toei requested that Nagai create a human-like demon superhero; thus he created Devilman, which was greatly inspired by Demon Lord Dante. Although considered a "groundbreaking work", Demon Lord Dante "was forever eclipsed" by this decision. Jonathan Clements and Helen McCarthy wrote in The Anime Encyclopedia that the series "is undoubtedly a prototype, not just for Devilman but for all the apocalyptic tales that followed, particularly Nagai's later Shutendoji. However, in only being made into an anime 30 years after its publication, [the series] appears to all intents and purposes more like a poorman's Urotsukidoji".

== See also ==
- Devilman Lady
