= Ayana Sakai =

Japanese actress

- Born: 16 May 1985 (age 41); Mobara, Japan
- Occupation: Actress
- Years active: 1998-present
- Spouse: tetsuya (m. 2007)
- Children: 2

Ayana Sakai (酒井彩名, Sakai Ayana; born 16 May 1985) is a Japanese actress. She has appeared in more than twelve films since 1998.

== Selected filmography ==
Year	Title	Role	Notes
1999	Man, Next Natural Girl: 100 Nights in Yokohama	Man Koda	TV film
2003	Battle Royale II: Requiem	Nao Asakura	
2004	Devilman	Miki Makimura	
2008	Flying Rabbits	Megumi Aihara	
