= Mazinger Z vs. Devilman =

1973 animated movie directed by Tomoharu Katsumata

- Poster of the film Mazinger Z tai Devilman
- Directed by: Tomoharu Katsumata
- Written by: Susumu Takahisa
- Produced by: Toshio Katsuta
- Starring: Hiroya Ishimaru; Ryōichi Tanaka
- Music by: Michiaki Watanabe
- Production companies: Toei Animation, Dynamic Production
- Release date: July 18, 1973
- Running time: 43 minutes
- Country: Japan
- Language: Japanese

Mazinger Z vs. Devilman (マジンガーZ対デビルマン, Majingā Zetto tai Debiruman) is a 1973 animated movie that crossed over two then-popular anime series, both of which were created by manga artist Go Nagai.

The movie features alternate versions of events from both series and is therefore not canonical to either one.

== Story ==
The movie opens with a battle between the Super Robots Mazinger Z and Aphrodite A against three of Doctor Hell's Mechanical Beasts. The heroes win, but the battle apparently frees the female demon Sirène from below the ground. She flies away before they can do anything about it. However she is seen by Akira Fudo, who transforms into his real form of Devilman to fly after her.

Dr. Hell, who observed the battle, correctly realizes that Sirène is part of the "Demon Tribe" that according to a legend ruled the Earth in prehistoric times. Using his new flying fortress, Navarone, Dr. Hell and his henchman Baron Ashura follow Sirène to the Himalaya Mountains, were the rest of the demons are frozen. Hell helps to free some of the demons, and places a mind control transceiver into their chests. He makes a deal with them to help them defeat their enemy, Devilman, if they will help him defeat Mazinger Z. They are unaware that Devilman has spied on their conversation.

Later, Akira goes to warn Koji about this but ends up mocking the Mazinger Z for being unable to fly; this leads to the two hot-tempered teenagers racing each other on motorcycles. It turns out the Photon Power Laboratory, is already working on solving the robot's disadvantage against flying enemies by creating the Jet Scrander, a giant winged jet pack. However one of the demons has spied on them and reports this development to Dr. Hell. He sends demons Bugo and Sirène to destroy the Scrander. They manage to damage it before being driven off by Koji's ray gun; Sirène escapes by taking Shiro and Sayaka hostage. They are then saved by Devilman. When Koji goes to pick them up, he watches Akira change into Devilman and learns his secret. Devilman follows Bugo to the sea, but falls into a trap; he's rescued by Koji in the Mazinger Z. Afterwards they talk, and Akira reveals to him that he's a rogue member of the Demon Tribe who fights to protect humanity.

The combined forces of Dr. Hell and the demons then attack the Laboratory; Devilman flies to help defend it, but is overwhelmed and captured. He's taken above the clouds, where he's placed on an ice cross and tortured by the demons for being a traitor. However, as soon as the Scrander is repaired, Koji uses it to fly the Mazinger Z into the clouds, killing the demons, freeing Devilman and finally destroying the flying fortress. Dr. Hell escapes, but swears to get Mazinger Z someday.

The movie ends with Koji and Devilman on good terms. Devilman flies off, stating the Demon Tribe is still out there. Shiro is upset Devilman has left, but Sayaka assures he will always be in their hearts.

== Characters ==
- Koji Kabuto (played by Hiroya Ishimaru)
- Sayaka Yumi (played by Minori Matsushima)
- Shiro Kabuto (played by Kazuko Sawada)
- Prof. Yumi (played by Joji Yanami)
- Boss (played by Hiroshi Ohtake)
- Dr. Hell (played by Kosei Tomita)
- Baron Ashura (played by Hidekatsu Shibata and Haruko Kitahama)
- Iron Masks (played by Koji Yada)
- Devilman/Akira Fudo (played by Ryoichi Tanaka)
- Madame Sirene (played by Kyoko Satomi, replacing Haruko Kitahama from the Devilman TV series)
- Demon General Zannin (played by Kiyoshi Kobayashi, replacing Masao Nakasone from the Devilman TV series)
- Bugo (played by Joji Aoki)
- Mr. Alphonne (played by Ichiro Nagai)
- Principal Pochi (played by Joji Yanami)

== Production Staff ==
- Producer: Shunichi Toishi
- Production Manager: Seiichi Moro
- Planning: Ken Ariga and Toshio Katsuta
- Original Work: Go Nagai with Dynamic Pro.
- Screenplay: Susumu Takaku
- Soundtrack: Michiaki Watanabe and Go Misawa
- Assistant Director: Yuji Endo
- Art Director: Mataharu Urata
- Animation Director: Koichi Tsunoda
- Director: Tomoharu Katsumata
