= Yasutaka Nagai =

Japanese writer

- Born: Hiroshi Nagai; March 10, 1941 (age 85); Shanghai, China
- Other names: Hiroshi Koenji (高円寺博), Baku Nagai (永井ばく)
- Occupations: Novelist, manga writer, scenario writer

Hiroshi Nagai (永井 博, Nagai Hiroshi; born March 10, 1941 in Shanghai, China), better known by the pseudonym Yasutaka Nagai (永井 泰宇, Nagai Yasutaka), is a Chinese-born Japanese novelist, manga author and scenario writer. He is one of the four brothers of manga artist Go Nagai.

In 1969, he was a candidate for the Edogawa Rampo Prize for his novel Baptism of Blood (鮮血のバプテスマ Senketsu no Baputesuma), written under the pen name Baku Nagai (the onyomi reading of his birth name), but lost to Seiichi Morimura. He abandoned his activities as a writer, for a time, with the establishment of Dynamic Production. He would re-debut as a writer in 1981 with Shin Devilman (not to be confused with the manga of similar name with which he also collaborated).

When working as a comic writer, he usually takes yet another pen name, that of Hiroshi Koenji. He wrote several comics for both his brother Go Nagai and Ken Ishikawa, such as Maboroshi Panty, Haru Ichiban and Shinrei Tantei Occult Dan, among others.
