= Devil Lady =

Japanese manga series by Go Nagai

- Volume 3 cover art, featuring the characters Lan (left) and Jun (right)

デビルマン レディー (Debiruman Redī)
- Genre: Psychological horror, yuri
- Manga
- Written by: Go Nagai
- Published by: Kodansha
- Magazine: Weekly Morning
- Original run: January 30, 1997 – July 6, 2000
- Volumes: 17
- Anime television series
- Directed by: Toshiki Hirano
- Written by: Chiaki J. Konaka
- Music by: Toshiyuki Watanabe
- Studio: TMS-Kyokuichi
- Licensed by: NA: Discotek Media
- Original network: MBS
- Original run: October 10, 1998 – May 9, 1999
- Episodes: 26
- Manga

Cutie Honey vs. Devilman Lady
- Written by: Go Nagai
- Published by: Akita Shoten
- Magazine: Champion Red Ichigo
- Original run: June 5, 2013 – October 4, 2013
- Volumes: 1
- icon

Devil Lady, known in Japan as Devilman Lady (Japanese: デビルマンレディー, Hepburn: Debiruman Redī), is a Japanese hentai manga series written and illustrated by Go Nagai. It is the sequel to Devilman, and is one of two alternate sequels to the original manga following Violence Jack in 1973, taking place in an alternate Earth after the conclusion of the original Devilman story. It was originally serialized by Kodansha from January 1997 to July 2000 in the magazine Weekly Morning, and later collected in 17 volumes. The story follows Jun Fudo, a model who can transform into the powerful Devil Lady and protects humanity from devil beasts and their creations.

The manga was adapted into a twenty-six episode anime series by TMS Entertainment from 1998 to 1999, which was released in the US by ADV Films in 2003–2004, and later available through streaming by Midnight Pulp. A manga crossover with Cutie Honey, another Nagai series, was published in 2013 under the title Cutie Honey vs. Devilman Lady.

== Plot ==
=== Manga ===
Set in Japan after the events of Devilman, the story follows Jun Fudo, a teacher and former athlete who lives alone with her younger brother, Hikaru, while their father is away in the United States. For reasons unknown to her, Jun begins to experience unusual nightmares that cause sexual urges. One day, she and some students are attacked by a group of demons during a school trip. The demons kill the male students and rape Jun and the female students. In the conflict, her spirit tears up and she transforms into a Devilman, killing the demons with her newfound strength. After that, a woman named Lan Asuka appears and says she was the one who awakened the beast within Jun.

Confused by her transformation, Lan Asuka, and her father's sudden appearance and experience, things became too complicated for Jun. Professor Fudo knowledge tells a tale of a strange phenomenon that occurred in shantytowns years ago. It was known as the "Devil Beast Syndrome" in which causes its human hosts to mutate into demon-like mutants and rape women before eating them with no memories or intelligence of their previous lives and additionally giving them enhanced strength with other abilities.

Professor Fudo does not believe that their "Devil Beast Syndrome" transformation was supernatural, but was actually the next stage of human evolution, calling it "Nature's way of dealing with mankind's overpopulation". He states that few people were genetically engineered to retain their conscience should the "Devil Beast Syndrome" occur in them, although Jun is one of them. With Jun now becoming the Devil Lady, she fights to protect humanity from the devil beasts and their creations.

Jun, and Asuka fight demons and become close friends. One day Jun investigates the Grumech Embassy. She is put through a demonic ritual that opens the Gates of Hell and sends Jun through them. Here she meets a mysterious man who introduces himself as Akira Fudo. Jun recognizes Akira to be the man she had seen in her visions. Akira explains that he is from a past that no longer exists, as God wiped the Earth out after Akira and Satan's battle at the end of Devilman. He offers to act as a guide on Jun's journey through Hell during which the two fall in love and have sex. During their descent through Hell, they face other characters from Akira's past, including Silene/Sirene and Kaim. Once they reach the lowest point of Hell, they realize that the demon king is there frozen in ice, but Satan is nowhere to be found. On their way back Akira tells Jun about his past with Satan. However, when they reach the surface, Akira cannot follow Jun back to Earth. She promises to never forget him and leaves.

After Jun returns to the world several things change, altering the past. Events that led her to fall to Hell are missing. Jun keeps communicating with Akira through the Devilman Ghost customer she made, but slowly forgets his name. The only person she really feels close to is Asuka, who is revealed to be her half-sibling. She starts really opening up to her without knowing that she actually killed their mother with her supernatural powers

In later chapters after the leader of the mysterious Cult of Dante, Ryo Utsugi awakens the great demon Lord Zennon by fusing with him and releases Hell's inhabitants into the world including demons, Devilman, and humans held in Hell, chaos and carnage break loose on Earth and the battle between God's army and Satan's demonic forces draws closer.

Asuka seduces and impregnates Jun while possessing a male form. Asuka reveals that she was born an intersex and chose to hide in a female form from the eyes of God. After Jun is forced to give birth in her giant Devilman form to a full-grown Akira Fudo, Asuka reveals the truth to Jun with the help of Psycho Jenny who restores Jun's sealed memories: the half-siblings are actually the two halves of Satan who split himself in order to escape the time loop God threw him into and to be able to bring back Akira from Hell. After learning this, Jun fuses with Asuka, becoming Satan once again. Akira arrives and greets his old friend/enemy. This time, however, Akira joins Satan in his fight against God's army approaching Earth. As Satan puts it, the Akira who was reborn in Hell is different from the Akira who was born on Earth, as he now understands Satan's quest against God.

Leading God's army is Archangel Michael, Satan's twin. When Akira notices this, Satan describes himself and his twin as the right and the left hands of God. They have the same powers, but different functions.

The battle's victor is not revealed. The manga ends with Satan telling Akira that true hope lies on the other side of the battle as they are launching their attack. The manga ends with a final shot of Earth with humanity once again exterminated and the age of "myth" dawning on Earth once again.

=== Anime ===
Jun Fudo is an idolized supermodel. She has a secret that not even she knows about at first, for within her lie the genes that hold the next step in the evolution of mankind, the same blood as the beast-like superhumans that terrorize the city. Unlike them, Jun manages to hold a tenuous grip on her humanity and gets recruited by the mysterious Lan Asuka, a member of a secret organization within the government aimed at controlling, if not eliminating, these berserk destroyers of mankind. Jun, as Devil Lady, must exterminate her own kind. However, it is unclear how much longer she can keep her sanity. The story of the anime differs significantly from the manga, despite having similar beginnings – devils are not mystical beings but the next step of humanity's evolution. Unlike the manga, Devilman does not appear.

== Characters ==
Jun Fudo (不動 ジュン, Fudo Jun) / Devil Lady Voiced by: Junko Iwao (Japanese); Shawn Sides (English)
Jun is a successful supermodel. She is quiet and timid and avoids social interactions, with two exceptions: she is generally open with her manager and friendly with, Kazumi. Whenever Jun is attacked, stripped naked and raped by devil beasts that attempt to eat her (usually Jun is the one target that the devil beasts want to rape and eat her), her powers awaken and she becomes Devil Lady, defeating another beast. Initially under the thrall of Asuka, she gradually becomes more independent.

Lan Asuka (アスカ 蘭, Asuka Ran) Voiced by: Kaoru Shimamura (Japanese); Siân Rees-Cleland (English)
Asuka is a member of the Human Alliance and is a high-ranking government official. She is a cold, aggressive, and manipulative woman, who cares nothing for the people who work for her. She has no concern for Jun's survival and her theory that Jun is a devil beast is based only on a hunch. She seems to have different intentions from her organization and does a great deal of work without their knowledge. She was born in Jersey City, New Jersey to an American mother and a Japanese father. At the end of the anime, it is revealed that she is intersex and a powerful devil beast herself, who engineered the hunt for the devil beasts only to weed out the competition so she can take over the world. She is mostly a female equivalent of Ryo from Devilman, but unlike him, is not a fallen angel.

Akira Fudo (不動 明, Fudo Akira) / Devilman / Devil Mask
Akira Fudo is an ethereal being. Jun later meets him in Hell as Devilman, and he joins with her in the fight against Ryo. He appears only in the manga, but supporting character Takeshi Maki is based on him.

Ryo Utsugi (宇津木 涼, Utsugi Ryō) / Dante
In this storyline, Ryo Utsugi is the reincarnation of the Italian poet Dante Alighieri. Only appears in the manga.

Aoi Kurosaki (黒崎 あおい, Kurosaki Aoi) Voiced by: Megumi Ogata (Japanese); Laura Bussinger (English)
Aoi Kurosaki makes her first appearance in the 3rd volume of the manga, while in the anime she appears in episode 5. She is described as Jun's old classmate and mortal enemy during high school, while competing for the Olympics. No matter how hard Jun tries to win, Aoi is faster. However, she is actually in love with Jun and the only way she thinks to express it is through rivalry. Her transformation into a devil beast started when she was still young, as a result of her hatred for her stepfather who sexually abused her and her mother who ignored his abuse and abused her as well. However, the devil beast had its own personality and would tease and mock Aoi. She distinctively has a manly body complete with short hair, resembling a teenage boy (but with women's breasts).

Vlava
Vlava is the deity of a fictitious European country. He resembles the Cretan minotaur with a head that looks like the head of a bovine. Appearing in the manga's seventh volume, he and his followers practice human sacrifice in the Grumech embassy. Vlava and his followers descend to hell with Jun, he meets with Jinmen and forms an alliance with him to eliminate Devilman, who is protecting Jun. He is killed by Devilman in hell. Later on in the story, he reappears on Earth and joins Dante's Devil Beast army.

Devil Lady
Jun's alter ego, Devil Lady, is the exact opposite of Jun, although Jun's consciousness remains active. She is loud, violent, and temperamental. Her unforgiving and aggressive nature tends to make her battles graphic. As Devil Lady, all of her senses are greatly increased and she has night vision. Her ability to heal is amplified, bordering on regeneration. Her strength allows her to bend and twist steel girders, without struggle. She is able to fly via large wings that unfold from her back, and she can generate high-voltage electric currents to destroy her enemies instantly and form blades of energy around her arms or elbows to slice through almost anything. Her most powerful ability is the giga-effect, which allows her to become a giant and fight other devil beasts of that size. While in this form, she can fly and emit electricity from her hands similar to Great Mazinger's Thunder Break. In her empowered form, she can turn the wings on her head into razor-sharp blades.

Kazumi Takiura (滝浦 和美, Takiura Kazumi) Voiced by: Kazusa Murai (Japanese); Camille Chen (English)
Kazumi is a young high school girl, an aspiring teen model, and an avid fan of Jun's, who she admires and later meets during an audition when she entered the wrong building. They become friends, with Jun acting as a big sister and mentor. Kazumi's parents are brutally killed by devil beasts who try to kill Kazumi because they consider Jun a traitor and seek to punish her by targeting people close to her. However, Kazumi is spared when Jun in her Devil Lady persona dispatches the demons, saving her life; but due to the death of her parents, she temporarily goes to stay with relatives. The now orphaned Kazumi is later taken in by Jun, and is unaware of Jun's nightlife, although she suspects something is wrong. The relationship between Kazumi and Jun gradually progresses becomes romantic.

Dr. Jason Bates (ジェイソン・ベイツ, Jeison Beitsu) Voiced by: Ryūsei Nakao (Japanese); J. Hudson Brownlee (English)
Bates is a scientist and Devilman working at the Samuelson Labs in New Jersey and is the current head of all Devil-beast research. He sympathizes with the Devil Beasts. Bates is the first devil beast to retain human faculties; while in this form, he possesses immense strength, two sharp horns on his head similar to Gaiking's, and can absorb the attributes of other devil beasts by consuming their blood. However, he initially lacks the giga-effect, and sometimes acts as though he would prefer to give in to his beast side and run amok.

Kiyoshi Maeda (前田 清, Maeda Kiyoshi) Voiced by: Takumi Yamazaki (Japanese); Britt Baker (English)
Maeda is Asuka's personal secretary and Jun's driver. Although he works for Asuka, he is more morally concerned with Jun and tries to help her.

Tatsuya Yuasa (湯浅 辰也, Yuasa Tatsuya) Voiced by: Naoya Uchida (Japanese); Ryan Rutledge (English)
Yuasa is Jun's modelling agent. He has a wife and daughter who love him.

Satoru (サトル) Voiced by: Mami Koyama (Japanese); J. Shanon Weaver (English)
Satoru is a child who acts as the leader and organizer of the more militant Devil-Beasts whose intention is the genocide of all humans. Satoru is a clever and dangerous foe who Jun underestimates. He considers Jun a traitor to his kind and will use all of his resources to make her life a living nightmare. Unlike other characters, he is not referred to by name. Although he first appears in episode 3, he does not return until episode 14, assuming the role of the antagonist until the final episodes. His powers include morphing into a butterfly, a resilient body, butterfly wings, summoning crow guardians, levitation, mind control, and disabling electronics by thought.

Devil Beasts
Also referred to as demons and beast creatures, devil beasts are carnivorous predators who have evolved from humans. Devil beasts can morph into humans while not hunting and become stronger by consuming them. Some devil beasts can become much larger in size, the "Giga effect" and are caused by chemical reactions via electrical pulses in sensory organs.

Classifications as per anime official trading cards are next to the names in parentheses.

- Wilber (Wolf Beast): appears in episodes 1 and 2. Powers include sharp claws and in his giga effect form an extra set of arms in the rib cage.
- Kazar (Flying Beast): appears in episode 2. Powers include a beetle shell armed with very strong pincers and spear-like centipede legs. He is revived in episode 20 by Naperius.
- Legzaimo (Insect Beast): appears in episode 3. Powers include summoning carnivorous earwigs and large rat fangs. He is revived in episode 20 by Naperius.
- Harpi (Bird Beast): appears in episodes 3 and 14. One of the few Devil Beasts who can talk while transformed works as an assassin for Satoru. Powers include flight and razor-sharp talons. She resembles Silene from the original Devilman series and OVAs, being a blue-skinned, white-feathered harpy. She is revived in episode 20 by Naperius.
- Germ (Plant Beast): appears in episode 4. Powers include extensible tentacles and emitting massive amounts of carbon dioxide. Her real name is Noriko Oda. She heavily resembles Biollante from the Godzilla movies.
- Marmiga (Shark Beast): appears in episode 5. Powers include fast swimming, sharp teeth, a powerful tail, and mouth tentacles. Her real name is Aoi Kurosaki, she is a swimming champion.
- Fayrace (Cat Beast): appears in episode 6. Powers include sharp claws and three whip-like tails. Her real name as a human is Hitomi Konno, a friend of Jun.
- Airial (Weasel Beast): appears in episode 7. Resembles an anthropomorphic insectoid weasel with giant scythes. Powers include scythe blades for arms, speed, high jumping, a powerful tail, and can morph into his giga effect form after absorbing massive amounts of water.
- Spargel (Dinosaur Beast): appears in episode 8. Powers include two tyrannosaurus-like heads near his face, high jumping, and four arms armed with sharp claws. He is revived in episode 20 by Naperius.
- Argos (Eyeball Beast): appears in episode 9. Powers include flying eye probes from his body and high resistance to pain. He has a serious fear of being watched and is easily burnt. Inspired by the mythical Greek creature Argos.
- Flame (Flame Beast): appears in episode 10. Powers include a fiery body, levitation, changing her size, telekinesis, and extremely high resistance to pain. She will die if she stops emitting her flames. Her human identity is Remi Takashima.
- Kilner (Chameleon Beast): appears in episode 11. Powers include wall-crawling, a long tongue and tail ideal for coiling and whipping, speed, resistance to projectiles, camouflage similar to a chameleon, and in his giga effect form can emit electrical surges. As a human, he was known as Tachibana.
- Faces (Faces Beast): appears in episode 12. Powers include speed, large bladed arms, can attach faces to his body to morph into his giga effect form, and in his giga effect form a second set of jaws on the abdomen that can emit slicing shockwaves from the extra blades on his arms. His human absorbing powers are very similar to those of Jinmen in the Devilman OVAs.
- Jain (Snake Beast): appears in episode 13. Powers include a blood-draining forked tongue, mind-control saliva, and speed.
- Agito: appears in episode 14. Powers include a large set of jaws on the abdomen and the shoulders and scythe-like arms. His jaws heavily resemble those of Dragonsaurus from Grendizer, Getter Robot G, Great Mazinger: Kessen! Daikaijuu.
- Krahn: appears in episode 14. His only known powers are constricting octopus arms.
- Guardian Crows (Crow Beasts): first appearance in episode 14. They serve as Satoru's bodyguards and possess extremely fast flight and invisibility. When not in battle they can shape-shift into normal crows as well as humans.
- Tangrof (Frog Beast): appears in episode 16. Is in Giga form by default. Powers include coiling tongues, acidic saliva, and an explosive-resistant jawed tail.
- Imotail (Lizard Beast): appears in episode 16. Powers include disguising herself as human, having a coiling tail that can be controlled even after being detached, and wall-crawling.
- Chika: appears in episodes 18 to 21. Powers include sharp claws and speed. Unlike most devil beasts she and her friends have control over their transformations and are only hostile in self-defence instead of being mindless killers. She looks like a nekomimi (human with cat ears) by default but can turn into a full-on anthropomorphic feline with fur covering her body and a tail. She is friends with Jun and dies protecting the other Devil Beast children from the human task force hunting Devil Beasts.
- Takeshi Maki: appears in episodes 19 to 25. His only known power is emitting electricity. He serves as an ex-py of Akira from the original Devilman and his devil beast form is a mix between the manga and television series versions of Devilman; like Chiko and her friends, he has control over his transformation and is not a mindless killer.
- Megawamu: appears in episode 19. His only known power is his centipede-like spear legs.
- Chiyoko: appears in episode 24. Her only known powers are a weak form of telepathy and an eye inside of her forehead that can be used for hypnosis and emit small sonic bursts. Unlike other devil beasts, she does not fully transform, primarily by influence through Jun.

=== Crusaders ===
Four bird-like devil beasts commanded by Satoru in the last third of the series with each possessing the ability to control a specific element. In episode 23 all four of them fuse with Satoru to become Giga Satoru.

- Andrus (Eagle Beast): first appears in episode 17 and has the elemental ability of fire. He has a beaked eagle head and a feathered body, with his human face located on his chest. When untransformed, he has the alias of Higa Noboru. When he discusses his devil beast powers with Satoru one can see him painting an incomplete model of Mazinger Z.
- Marfus (Vulture Beast): first appears in episode 19 and has the elemental ability of lightning. Other powers include activating innate devil-beast transformations in humans that would otherwise not have them. He has a mostly human face but a body covered by feathers. His real name is Kotura Kasumi.
- Napelius (Swan Beast): first appears in episode 19 and has the elemental ability of ice. Other powers include reviving dead devil beasts and regeneration. Unlike Andrus and Storus, she has a human face with bird-beak-like horns. As a human, her name is Izumi Kogure.
- Storus (Owl Beast): first appears in episode 19 and has the elemental ability of wind. He heavily resembles an owl with a human face on his chest and goes by the human name of Kitano Yuichi.
- Giga Satoru: first appears in episode 23. Powers include flight, explosive fireballs from the hands, energy-covered metal spears, and can summon of a sword that emits fire.

== Production ==
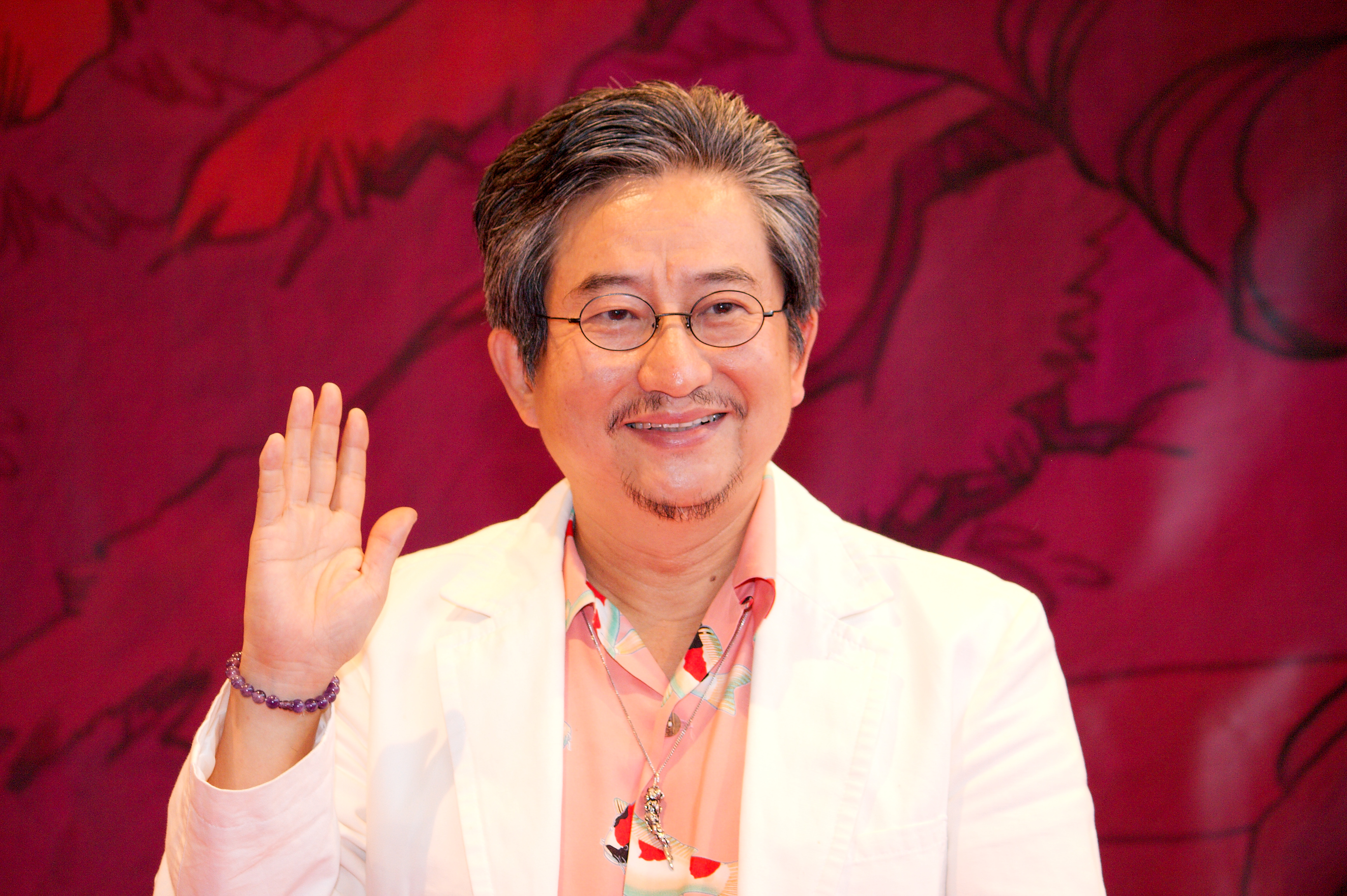
The series was written and illustrated by Go Nagai.

The Devilman Lady manga was written and illustrated by Go Nagai, and was serialized from January 1997 to July 2000 in the manga magazine Weekly Morning. It was later collected in 17 tankōbon volumes by Kodansha from July 1997 to August 2000. The manga was published in Italy by d/visual.

== Other media ==
=== Anime ===
A twenty-six-episode anime series adaptation was produced by TMS Entertainment, directed by Toshiki Hirano and written by Chiaki J. Konaka, with art direction by Toru Koga, character designs by Shinobu Nishioka, and monster designs by Hiroshi Maruyama. It aired in Japan on MBS TV from October 11, 1998, to May 9, 1999. ADV Films announced it had licensed the series in July 2002, and released the first volume on January 7, 2003. Midnight Pulp started streaming the series on June 21, 2019. Tubi added it. The Devil Lady anime's storyline is different from the manga, featuring only two characters from the manga, Jun Fudo and Lan Asuka.

When creating the Devil Lady anime, many concepts and characters were changed. It was more violent and sexually oriented. Jun is portrayed as tougher and braver – she stands up for herself and rarely needs others to save her, while in the manga; she is often a damsel in distress. She is a teacher by profession. Kazumi never appeared in the original manga. Her looks are based upon the character Miki Makimura, Akira Fudo's female friend in the Devilman series.

Jun's two forms are a tribute to both versions. While her regular-sized form is similar to Devilman (including satyr-like hairy legs) as he appears in the original manga, her Giga Effect form is a tribute to the 1972 anime version. In Giga mode, she is a giant as tall as classic giant robots or monsters of the 70s, sports turquoise skin and yellow eyes, and displays no body hair, which are all elements taken from the television version of Devilman.

==== Episodes ====
No.	Title	Original release date
1	"Beast" (Japanese: 獣)	October 11, 1998
Jun Fudo seems to be going through the motions in her photo shoot, although the photographer tells her she is doing wonderfully. Jun is later attacked by a werewolf who awakened Jun's Devil Lady. After fighting the werewolf Jun meets Lan Asuka.
2	"Blood" (Japanese: 血)	October 18, 1998
Jun exhibits abilities that were unimaginable by the Human Alliance (HA). Jun cannot believe what is happening and wonders if it was all just a nightmare.
3	"Wings" (Japanese: 翼)	October 25, 1998
The devil-beasts cannot understand why Jun holds onto her inferior human side, and seek to punish her. They find out about those close to Jun, picking Kazumi as an easy target. While Jun saves Kazumi, she is unable to stop the beasts from brutally killing Kazumi's parents.
4	"Seed" (Japanese: 胚)	November 1, 1998
Jun is reeling and reflects on how she is different. She falls into self-pity, as she is seemingly held captive by the HA, the organization that utilizes her to destroy other beasts. Jun is leery of people in the shadows, thanks to her last encounter. A new beast with an unusual characteristic is discovered.
5	"Shark" (Japanese: 鮫)	November 8, 1998
Thanks to Asuka, Jun has a reunion with high school friend, Aoi Kurosaki. Their friendship does not last as Jun and her ex-classmate have a difference of opinion on the relationship. Kazumi feels left out, however, Jun's encounter only strengthens her bond with Kazumi.
6	"Cat" (Japanese: 猫)	November 15, 1998
Jun experiences a love-hate relationship when she meets Hitomi Konno, a competitive supermodel who idolizes her and loves cats.
7	"Fog" (Japanese: 霧)	November 22, 1998
With each transformation, the risk increases that Jun will lose her human side. Events take Jun's thoughts to her grandfather's story about the Grim Reaper hoping she would go to bed, only increasing Jun's curiosity.
8	"Enemy" (Japanese: 敵)	November 29, 1998
The HA continues its attempt to keep the general population from discovering the devil-beast phenomenon. A broadcaster attempts to release the news of the devil-beasts. Jun is introduced to Dr Bates. He has come to observe the giga-effect. He does not believe that beasts are inherently evil and that devil-beasts can retain their human soul. Jun's confrontation with the broadcaster does not go as planned, as a devil-beast in a television studio nearly kills her. However, she is saved by Bates, revealed to be a devilman.
9	"Eyes" (Japanese: 眼)	December 6, 1998
Jun dwells upon her previous failure and the disappointments of Asuka and Bates. While looking into a store window, Jun feels someone watching her. She finds herself in a park for a photo shoot. Kazumi is interviewed and photographed. She meets Shiro Sakazawa, a private investigator who has an interest in what happened to her family. Those around Jun begin to question her sanity when she claims to continually feel watched.
10	"Flames" (Japanese: 炎)	December 13, 1998
A large fire at the Sakura Housing Complex looks suspicious, as firefighters are surprised to find a survivor. Jun disagrees with Asuka, believing that the survivor is a devil-beast since survival would have been otherwise impossible, especially because this survivor is a child. The Biochemical Investigations Team decides to study the child to find out the truth. Kazumi reviews a videotape sent by Sakazawa. Remembering his earlier comment, she wonders about Jun. Moreover, Jun's frequent and sudden departures damage Kazumi's confidence in their relationship.
11	"Box" (Japanese: 箱)	December 20, 1998
A department store executive disappears after be is falsely accused. He is not the only one who disappears. Jun is called in to handle this situation in a public department store.
12	"Faces" (Japanese: 顔)	January 10, 1999
Jun has recurring visions of a devil-beast world. After running into Bates in the streets, he invites her to a cavern bar, where he accuses her of enjoying the kill and calls her weak mentally and physically. The authorities are finding victims with their faces missing, while Bates obsesses over Jun's and some of the other devil-beasts' ability to manifest the giga-effect. Asuka's orders reflect her belief that devil-beasts in the giga-effect are no longer in control, endangering Jun's life.
13	"Rope" (Japanese: 縄)	January 17, 1999
Jun has a photo shoot with inexperienced model Takai, a high school student, that is more intimate than usual. Jun shows interest in a phone call that Tatsuya Yuasa receives during the shoot. After the shoot, Jun acts inappropriately with Takai and shows regret. Jun later sees Sakazawa speaking to Kazumi and Yuasa in separate incidents. She concludes the man is a nuisance. Asuka picks up Jun and tells her they are going for a ride in the country. She tells Jun they have found a victim with one-third of the blood drained from the body.
14	"Home" (Japanese: 家)	January 24, 1999
Sakazawa remembers his life before the beast obsession. Kazumi goes missing and Jun becomes focused on finding her. Meanwhile, Kazumi realizes she has been used, but is not quite sure for what. The HA has its hands full with another beast and receives unexpected help from Bates. The battle between the beast factions accelerates.
15	"Crows" (Japanese: 鴉)	January 31, 1999
Kazumi's conversation after a photo shoot plants the seeds of remembrance regarding her parents' death. Bodies begin to appear on top of lamp posts, utility poles and other odd places. Sakazawa's warnings replay in Kazumi's mind. Crows show up in odd places. Kiyoshi chauffeurs Jun while Asuka is away doing more research on the devil-beasts. Kazumi once again becomes noticed by the devil-beasts.
16	"Voice" (Japanese: 聲)	February 7, 1999
Bodies on top of traffic posts continue to appear. HA begins to have trouble keeping the secret of the devil-beasts. Maeda gets directly involved in the fight. Kazumi's voice is a godsend to Jun.
17	"Hunger" (Japanese: 飢)	February 14, 1999
Satoru continues to recruit beasts. Jun appears to be losing control of her beast side. She calms down and regains her human consciousness when Asuka returns.
18	"Body" (Japanese: 軀)	February 21, 1999
The battle between humans and devil-beasts worsens. Asuka's behaviour is drawing HA attention.
19	"Fetters" (Japanese: 枷)	February 28, 1999
Kazumi is still getting used to the idea of beasts in the open. She worries about being able to trust a devil beast other than Jun. Yuasa is surprised to see Maeda after their last conversation, and Maeda becomes more suspicious of Asuka. The battle with the beast is no longer a secret, as Yuasa and Jun temporarily relive a normal workday. Yuasa's wife and daughter, Satomi and Mayu evacuate to a train, however, a beast appears and wrecks the train. It is up to Jun to come and save Mayu from the beast.
20	"Corpses" (Japanese: 骸)	March 7, 1999
In America, Asuka gets a new private secretary, Captain Izume Kogure. Jun grudgingly meets some old acquaintances as well as a new more powerful associate of Satoru's recruited devil-beasts. Maeda discovers Asuka's secret past. Jun and Satoru have a battle of the wills.
21	"Signs" (Japanese: 印)	March 21, 1999
Maeda discovers the truth about the RNA Transmutation Inoculation and informs Jun. Kazumi becomes closer to her new friends but still wants to be with Jun.
22	"Wish" (Japanese: 願)	April 11, 1999
Jun unexpectedly receives help from Kazumi when defeat is imminent. Kazumi remembers her first meeting with Jun. Hostility increases between humans and the devil beasts, as Satoru continues to recruit his army. Izumi is concerned about Asuka. Jun inspires a fond childhood memory in Kazumi, causing Kazumi to want to help Jun in any way she can.
23	"Life" (Japanese: 命)	April 18, 1999
Jun becomes legendary among the gentler beasts as their champion. Kazumi's influence inspires hope in her friends. They expect Jun to rescue them. Asuka's plan becomes more apparent. Jun faces a beast with unexpected strength.
24	"Heart" (Japanese: 心)	April 25, 1999
Jun befriends a new young companion who understands Jun's past. Unfortunately, Chiyoko does not understand why Jun had to do what she did. She does not understand the line that Jun must not cross.
25	"God" (Japanese: 神)	May 2, 1999
Beasts are kept like prisoners and Kyoko, Misaki, Takae and Takeshi try to avoid extermination in the beast prison. Asuka sends an unfriendly welcoming party when Jun returns to Tokyo.
26	"Man" (Japanese: 人)	May 9, 1999
Asuka is revealed to be the child of God and appears all over the world to make everyone accept this. Jun awakens in a place and sees the demons trapped in a tower forged of demon bodies. She also finds Kazumi trapped in the tower. Jun decides to forge her soul with the force of the Demons, which Kazumi lets her absorb in order to help in the final battle with Asuka.

=== Cutie Honey vs. Devilman Lady ===
Cutie Honey vs. Devilman Lady, a crossover manga between Devil Lady and another series of Nagai's, Cutie Honey, was written and illustrated by Nagai and published by Akita Shoten in Champion Red Ichigo from June 5 – October 4, 2013. The series was collected in a single tankōbon volume on December 20, 2013.

== Pachinko ==
On March 7, 2012, a Devilman Lady pachinko machine called: CR Devilman Lady FPW (CRデビルマンレディー FPW) was launched, which is inspired by the adaptation of the anime.

== Reception ==
On June 12, 2015, the Chinese Ministry of Culture listed Devilman Lady among 38 anime and manga titles banned in China.
