= Violence Jack =

Japanese manga by Go Nagai and its adaptations

- Cover of the first volume of Violence Jack, as published in Japan by Kodansha

バイオレンスジャック (Baiorensu Jakku)
- Genre: Horror, post-apocalyptic
- Manga
- Written by: Go Nagai
- Published by: Kodansha; Chuokoron-Shinsha (reprint); Shogakukan (eBook)
- Magazine: Weekly Shōnen Magazine (1973–1974); Monthly Shōnen Magazine (1977–1978)
- Original run: July 1973 – December 1978
- Volumes: 7
- Manga

Violence Jack: Part 2
- Written by: Go Nagai
- Illustrated by: Dynamic Productions
- Published by: Nihon Bungeisha; Chuokouron-sha (reprint); Shogakukan (eBook)
- Magazine: Weekly Manga Goraku
- Original run: August 5, 1983 – March 23, 1990
- Volumes: 31
- Original video animation

Violence Jack: Harlem Bomber
- Directed by: Osamu Kamijo
- Produced by: Naotaka Yoshida; Toshihiko Sato
- Written by: Mikio Matsushita
- Studio: Ashi Productions
- Licensed by: NA: Discotek Media
- Released: June 5, 1986
- Runtime: 37 minutes
- Novel series
- Written by: Yasutaka Nagai
- Illustrated by: Go Nagai
- Published by: Kadokawa Shoten
- Imprint: Kadokawa Bunko
- Original run: August 1986 – April 1987
- Volumes: 2
- Original video animation

Violence Jack: Evil Town
- Directed by: Ichirō Itano
- Produced by: Kazufumi Nomura
- Written by: Shō Aikawa (as Noboru Aikawa)
- Music by: Hiroshi Ogasawara
- Studio: Studio 88
- Licensed by: NA: Discotek Media
- Released: December 21, 1988
- Runtime: 60 minutes
- Original video animation

Violence Jack: Hell's Wind
- Directed by: Takuya Wada
- Produced by: Yoshio Nakamura
- Written by: Takuya Wada
- Music by: Kaoru Ohori, Hiroyuki Kozu, Takeo Miratsu
- Studio: Studio 88
- Licensed by: NA: Discotek Media
- Released: November 9, 1990
- Runtime: 55 minutes
- Manga

Violence Jack Mao Korin Hen
- Written by: Go Nagai
- Published by: Nihon Bungeisha; Chuokoron-Shinsha (complete edition); Shogakukan; ebookjapan
- Published: November 1, 1993
- Volumes: 1
- Novel

Violence Jack: Ogon Toshi Hen
- Written by: Tatsuhiko Dan
- Illustrated by: Go Nagai
- Published by: Kodansha
- Published: July 1995
- Manga

Violence Jack Sengoku Majinden
- Written by: Go Nagai
- Published by: Shueisha
- Magazine: Weekly Young Jump Special
- Published: December 10, 2001
- Manga

Shin Violence Jack
- Written by: Go Nagai
- Published by: Shinchosha
- Magazine: Comic Bunch
- Original run: May 13, 2005 – April 11, 2008
- Volumes: 2
- Manga

Violence Jack 20XX
- Written by: Yū Kinutani
- Published by: Kodansha
- Magazine: Monthly Young Magazine
- Original run: February 19, 2021 – November 21, 2022
- Volumes: 4
- icon

Violence Jack (Japanese: バイオレンスジャック, Hepburn: Baiorensu Jakku) is a Japanese manga, written and illustrated by Go Nagai since 1973 until its conclusion in 1990. It has had several serializations and one-shot stories which have run in the 1970s, 1980s, 1990s and 2000s. Most of the stories have been compiled in around 38 tankōbon volumes, while a few of them have been published as special tankōbon or have yet to be published in that format. Violence Jack is credited with introducing the post-apocalyptic genre to the mediums of manga and anime.

A set of sagas from the manga were adapted in three independent original video animations (OVAs) released in 1986, 1988 and 1990. These OVAs have been released in the United States, Italy, France, the United Kingdom, Australia, and New Zealand. In some of these countries, the contents of the OVAs have caused censorship issues, while in Australia the second OVA was banned altogether.

The manga reuses many concepts and characters from other Go Nagai works, and the final chapter reveals that it is a direct sequel to the original Devilman manga, set in an alternate Earth after the conclusion of its story.

== Characters ==
Ryu Takuma
A young boy who survived the hell quake and became the leader to a group of children who live on the outskirts of Slum Town. Once a fifth grade student with a good heart and innocent spirit, Ryu's world changed forever after the Great Kanto Hell Quake. Losing all of his family, Ryu endured the new world alone and gathered a group of followers. He initially views Jack as a savior until witnessing Jack's thirst for violence and putting him and his group at risk. After being forced to fight against the Heretic Crew yakuza group and the Slum King's Dragon, Takuma becomes the leader of over three hundred children who band together to fight Slum King. As Takuma grows older, his influences increases further and becomes the main threat to the Slum King's rule over Kanto.
Violence Jack
A seemingly inhuman giant man with the muscles of a gorilla and the fangs of a wolf. He has burning, primordial eyes. He named himself after his signature weapon, a large foldout jackknife which he uses in combat. Having appeared out of nowhere after the Great Kanto Hell Quake, Jack wanders throughout Kanto, often picking street fights with those he sees as a threat to Kanto. He often helps those who are weaker than him who are preyed upon by violent nomads and criminals who scour Kanto. Although Jack is described as human, he is often the focal point of strange phenomena that occur in Kanto. Often when he has finished helping the weak and has destroyed the latest threat, he will suddenly vanish without a trace of him ever actually being there. Many of the towns he visits are often subjected to mysterious earthquakes that occur during or after his arrival. His presence alone sometimes incites those he is around to become violent and seek to attack him. He is also shown to utilize hallucinations to those he encounters, having once shown a young woman who was planning to sell a girl into slavery where she and her boyfriend are ruthlessly slaughtered. He is also frequently accompanied by a Golden Bird that is only seen at the end of certain arcs.
Slum King
The main antagonist in the central arc of Violence Jack, Slum King is a sadistic warlord who rules over the majority of the devastated Kanto region. He leads his Dragon army which is based on warring states Japan yet has access to heavy artillery. The Slum King is widely referred to as the 'Demon Lord' and his stronghold bears the name 'Castle Demon Lord'. Thirty years before the Hellquake, he was known as Takatora Doma and was the oldest son of the noble Doma family from Shinshu. Born with a rare, potentially fatal medical condition that accelerates the growth of muscle tissue, he given a heavy set of Samurai armor and an iron mask to prevent any overgrowth of muscle tissue and is locked away in a shed by his family out of fear. Doma is later given a private tutor who helps him to read and write. During later sessions, the tutor becomes aroused by Doma's lack of sexual experience and strips naked in front of him. He later escapes his confinement after discovering his brother and tutor having sex and violently murders them and the rest of his family before disappearing. A large giant of a man, Slum King is extremely strong and is a highly skilled swordsman. He is one of very few people who can take on Jack in a direct confrontation and survive. While his armor is meant to help in his medical condition, it also provides him with protection against most attacks. Violent and sadistic in nature, Slum King is widely feared throughout Kanto and is known to make anyone who angers or upsets him by cutting off their arms and legs to the joints and then cutting their tongues out to prevent them from speaking or killing themselves. After his first confrontation with Violence Jack, Slum King and his army scour the wasteland in search of his enemy.
Dog People
Two people resembling Ryu and Miki from Devilman who have had their tongues removed along with having their limbs cut off and replaced with wodden stumps for previously defying the Slum King. The Dog People are tightly leashed and are frequently abused for the King's pleasure or to air out his frustrations.
Zuba Ban
Born as Ban Doma, Zuba Ban is the Slum King's only son who inherited his father's superhuman strength as well as his sadism. Zuba Ban leads the Dragon's Hundred Dragon Regiment yet his own ambitions often put him in conflict with his own father.
Kraken
A huge masked man who appeared from nowhere, he oversees the Slum King's slave farm which is a vital part of the King's economy. Men and women are kidnapped from all across Kanto to be violated and worked to the brink of death. The Kraken's merciless army is one that even Ryu Takuma is keen to avoid engaging.
Jeanne
The Slum King's only daughter and Ban's sister who also inherited the King's monstrous strength but not his despicable personality. Born to a French mother, this kindhearted giant resembles Jeanne D'arc but frequently suffers traumatic flashbacks to her father continuously degrading and ultimately murdering her mother.
Saotome Mondo
A criminal seeking his destiny in wasteland of Kanto. Alongside his friend Mido, Mondo escaped to Kanto but was greeted by Jack, who proceeded to attack the two. Mondo's demeanour becomes much crueler upon learning of substantial gold hidden in the city of El Dorado, much to Mido's concern. Mondo's obsession reaches its climax when he challenges Jack to a duel with rocket launchers in order to learn the gold's location. Both he and Mido originate from the manga Gakuen Taikutsu Otoko, also known as Guerrilla High.
Tatsuma Mido
A jovial, androgynous young man who is the perfect foil to the quick-to-violence Mondo. Mido becomes increasingly concerned for his best friend and comrade Mondo as the latter succumbs to megalomania in El Dorado. Mido later learns he possesses the power of alchemy and that there is someone in Kanto who wants him dead.
Saburo Tenma
Affectionately known as 'Sabu' by his peers, Saburo Tenma grows up in the shadow of the ruthless Hell's Wind biker gang led by Dante. Tenma meets Jack as the latter fights against the marauding bandits and the 7-foot enigma leaves a giant impression on him.
Takeshi Kaido
A strong-willed boy who is forced to collect food along with his friends for malevolent sumo wrestlers. Kaido resents these monstrous thugs but is powerless to do anything until a chance encounter with Violence Jack.
Shingo Susano-o
A powerful alchemist who rules over the bustling yet lawless Future City. He is the head of the Susano-o clan who present a major threat to the Slum King's ambitions.
Mad Saurus
The Hell Town of Kanto arc's main antagonist and someone who is without equal in size, strength or ferocity – until Violence Jack appears.
Jim Mazinger
A Kenyan-born karate master known as the 'Machine God', he was blinded in a cowardly attack prior to the Kanto Hellquake and relies on a young Koji Kabuto to be his eyes.
Honey Kisaragi
A woman from New York who ventures into Kanto alongside her four friends to find her missing brother James, oblivious to the horrors which await her.
Yumehiko
A master of Koppojutsū, he protects a female psychic who can see the future, Himihiko, from the Slum King's Dragon.
Kurobe
A fiery youth similar in age to Ryu Takuma, he is initially a rival to the orphan leader but eventually grows to respect and fight alongside him

== Plot ==
=== Violence Jack ===
Violence Jack begins with the leader of an orphan motley crew, Ryu Takuma, berating a toddler named Bunta who failed to catch a single fish in a desolate Kanto. The story then flashes back to before the Great Kanto Hellquake where it shows 5th-grade Takuma needing his older sister, Yuri, to wake him up. The Hellquake happens as young Takuma is daydreaming in class, separated from his family. Desperate to find Yuri, Takuma drives an abandoned car through a blazing sea of flames, reuniting with Yuri but learning their parents have died. Takuma, Yuri and other survivors make camp where society's degradation is already apparent as desperate civilians fight for scraps of food. Mt. Tanzawa suddenly erupts, sending molten shards flying everywhere and Yuri sacrifices her life to save her younger brother with her lasts words being to claim victory by your own power. Yuri's death has a profound effect upon Takuma who now must survive in a devastated Kanto with no family.

After a massive earthquake (which in the OVAs was triggered by a Comet Cut off from the rest of the world, the survivors of the disaster are divided between the strong and the weak, and the land becomes a haven for criminals and renegades from around the world. Violence Jack is uncovered among the rubble and demolished granite by the inhabitants of a ruined city, asking him to help the weak people and helping them destroy what, in most cases, are the strong groups commanded by killers and rapists (this is the story line of "Violence Jack: Evil Town"). In the three OVAs, Jack is requested to help different groups, such as the Zone A (later he ends up helping Zone C women) or a small town, as shown in "Hell's Wind". As for the manga, the stories change drastically, the first being the story of Violence Jack helping a group of female models in a tropical forest in Kanto by possessing a boy living in said forest in order to fight off a roving tribe of bandits. Although Jack maintains a ruthless facade, he often helps the weak, and expects nothing in return. However, Jack's unpredictable nature means that bystanders get injured or even killed on occasion as a consequence of his vicious fighting style.

=== Shin Violence Jack ===
In Shin Violence Jack, a reboot to the series, Jack is an alternate form of Amon, while Akira is now living as an amnesiac warlord known as the Skull King, with the iconic Devilman demon Jinmen as his chief subordinate. With the help of his child form, his true form as Amon, a young boy named Ushio, and the reborn Sirene (who merges with the heroic Sara, essentially becoming a Devilman), Jack leads the assault on the Skull King's fortress, succeeding in restoring Akira's memories and igniting a rivalry between the duo.

=== Violence Jack 20XX ===
Violence Jack 20XX is a condensed remake of the original series, with select events rearranged and recontextualized into a continuous narrative.

== Publication ==
The first serialization ran from July 22, 1973, to September 29, 1974, in Weekly Shōnen Magazine, published by Kodansha. The second ran in Monthly Shōnen Magazine, also published by Kodansha, from July 1977 to December 1978, with a few gaps between months. This two serializations of Kodansha were originally published in 7 volumes.

Five years later, the serialization continued this time in the magazine Weekly Manga Goraku, published by Nihon Bungeisha, and ran from August 5, 1983, to March 23, 1990. This serialization originally produced 31 volumes in total.

On November 1, 1993, three years later after the end of the previous serialization, a special tankōbon called Violence Jack: Mao Korin Hen (バイオレンスジャック 魔王降臨編, Baiorensu Jakku Maō Kōrin Hen) was released by Nihon Bungeisha. Seven years later, on December 10, 2001, a special one-shot story, Violence Jack: Sengoku Majinden (バイオレンスジャック 戦国魔人伝, Baiorensu Jakku Sengoku Majinden), was published by Shueisha in a special edition of Weekly Young Jump, Bessatsu Young Jump #14. This story has been re-printed in GOGASHA, a two-volume compilation of short stories released in 2017.

In May 2005 (cover date May 13, 2005·20) the magazine Weekly Comic Bunch published by Shinchosha, the most recent serialization started, with Shin Violence Jack (新バイオレンスジャック, Shin Baiorensu Jakku). This serialization was irregularly published, stopping on August 19, 2005, and restarting on November 2, 2007, to end on April 11, 2008, in number 17 of Weekly Comic Bunch. This series was compiled and published by Media Factory in two volumes in 2010.

In the February 2021 issue of Kodansha's Monthly Young Magazine, it was announced that a new manga series written by Yū Kinutani, titled Violence Jack 20XX (バイオレンスジャック20XX, Baiorensu Jakku 20XX), began serialization on February 19, 2021, and finished on November 21, 2022. As of September 20, 2022, its chapters have been collected in three tankōbon volumes.

== Related media ==
=== Original video animation ===
Three OVAs were released from June 1986 to November 1990; the first being an original story not found in the manga whilst the second and third focus on the Hell Town of Kanto and Hell's Wind arcs, respectively.

==== Violence Jack: Harem Bomber ====
The first OVA Violence Jack: Harem Bomber (バイオレンスジャック ハーレムボンバー, Baiorensu Jakku: Hāremu Bonbā), also referred to in some translations as Harlem Bomber, was released in June 1986 (some sources place the release date on June 21, 1986, although others place the release date on June 5, 1986).

A comet strikes Earth, severely damaging the Kantō region. Volcanoes erupt and huge earthquakes are unleashed, reducing many cities to rubble and killing thousands of people. In this time of weakness, a ruthless man known as the Slum King took control of the Kantō Plain by brute force and rules it with an iron fist. However, in the middle of a trek across the land with his great forces at his side, he encounters a mighty beast-like man wearing a battered green jacket and a yellow ascot who slaughters his men and then targets the Slum King himself. They clash, but their fight is interrupted by a sudden massive tsunami that separates the two.

The Slum King survives the wave and returns to his immense fortress where he tells his men that no one can dare oppose him and be permitted to live. With that said, he promptly orders his men to find and kill Violence Jack, the man whom he confronted before.

Shortly afterwards, a young woman named Mari is captured by the Slum King's army and sent to a sex camp. Her boyfriend, Ken'ichi, rescues her with the help of Violence Jack.

Before Jack, Ken'ichi and Mari can escape, Harem Bomber arrives and challenges Jack to a fight. With great difficulty, Jack manages to defeat Harem Bomber, but at the price of the life of Ken'ichi, who is accidentally killed when Jack swings his helicopter into the Harem Bomber, launching him from the vehicle and causing him to fall to his death.

Mari awakens among the ruins, and looks up to see Jack taking the form of a gigantic golden bird, who flies away with Mari following him on foot.

==== Violence Jack: Evil Town ====
The second OVA, called Violence Jack: Evil Town (バイオレンスジャック 地獄街, Baiorensu Jakku: Jigokugai), was released on December 21, 1988. It was an especially controversial entry for the classifications since some of its themes involved necrophilia and cannibalism.

Due to a massive earthquake, an underground portion of Tokyo has been separated from the outside world. Because of the limited supply of food and the constant threat of intergroup warfare, the underground city's survivors have dubbed the area Hell City. When the story begins, Evil Town has been in existence for several months.

Evil Town is split into three "sections." Section A consists of businessmen and ordinary citizens, and is the most regulated section due to the presence of police officers. Section B, which consists of criminals and lunatics, is controlled by the huge gang leader Mad Saurus and his second in command, Blue, the drag. Section C, a former modeling agency, avoids contact with the other groups except when necessary.

Section A is attempting to dig their way back to the surface when they uncover Violence Jack, who has apparently been sealed in a rock wall since the earthquake. Section A's leaders invite Jack to stay as their protector, but the other sections have also learned of Jack's existence and call a meeting to see him for themselves.

At the meeting, the Section C leader Aila Mu offers to hire Jack as their guardian and tells him a disturbing story: After the earthquake occurred, the men of both A and B ran wild, capturing and raping the women until they learned that there was enough food for long-term survival. Many of the worst offenders are current Section A leaders, who would revert to behaving like animals if another disaster occurred. Convinced by Aila Mu's story, Jack agrees to aid Section C.

Riled by the lingering presence of Jack, Section B launches a surprise attack on Section A; as Aila predicted, A's leaders turn on one another in an attempt to survive, resulting in the near total destruction of the group. The survivors flee to Section C just as the women finish their own tunnel out of Hell City. Section B raiders arrive and finish off Section A, then begin assaulting the women. Jack arrives in time to rescue Section C and defeats the raiders, killing Blue and severely wounding Mad Saurus.

Mad Saurus mourns the loss of Blue, whom he accepted despite Blue's differences. In order to combine their power, Mad Saurus consumes her corpse, transforming into a devilish red creature to battle Jack a second time. During the ensuing fight, Saurus manages to seriously wound Jack using his fingernails, which have elongated into razor-sharp claws, but Jack manages to overpower him and stab him in the head using his jackknife. Mortally wounded, Saurus staggers about and proclaims that he will be reunited with Blue in Hell before dying.

The battle between Mad Saurus and Jack gives Section C enough time to make their way to the surface, which is now an open, grassy plain with several ruined buildings scattered around instead of a city. Aila Mu laments that her skills as a model are useless in the ruined world, but the rest of Section C assures her that she is a capable and beloved leader.

==== Violence Jack: Hell's Wind ====
The last OVA, Violence Jack: Hell's Wind (バイオレンスジャック ヘルスウインド編, Baiorensu Jakku: Herusu Uindo Hen), was released on November 9, 1990.

A short while after the cataclysms which rocked Japan, a peaceful town named 'Hope Town' has been established with the intent of returning peace to the region. The biker gang Hell's Wind show up and ransack it. Violence Jack makes his entrance here. The episode starts as a young woman, Jun, and her boyfriend, Tetsuya, are attacked. Tetsuya is murdered by Hell's Wind, and they assault and rape the terrified Jun soon after.

Jack arrives to fight the raiders, and fends off the gang by taking several gunshots which seem to have no effect on him.

Hell's Wind captures a young teacher and takes her to their camp at the Yokota Air Base. They take her top off and strap her to a fighter jet. At the behest of a little orphaned boy, Jack goes to rescue her. They try shooting him with a rocket launcher, but Jack tunnels under the ground and bursts out while being set on fire to kill everyone. The bike leader sends a messenger to their "supreme master" and request reinforcements. Jack finally kills the leader of the gang.

Jack departs, strangely heartened by speaking with the orphaned boy, who vowed to become stronger than anyone to protect the people around him.

The final scene shows another gang of horsemen coming from the distance and showing the messenger strapped to a post. A close-up is made to one of the vehicles to show the Slum King in full armor. The screen turns to black and Slum King's eyes appear, as he becomes furious, and the credits begin to roll.

==== Release ====
The English releases of the OVAs were out of their original order:

Japanese title	Japanese release order	English title	English release order
Violence Jack: Harem Bomber	1	Violence Jack: Slumking	3
Violence Jack: Evil Town	2	Violence Jack: Evil Town	1
Violence Jack: Hell's Wind Edition	3	Violence Jack: Hell's Wind	2

Most non-Japanese versions also use the same order of the English version.

Violence Jack was originally released in an edited form in the US by Manga Entertainment. As fans wanted to see it uncut, Right Stuf arranged with Manga Entertainment the release of an unedited version in November 1996. The label Critical Mass was created since it was considered to be too intense for the Right Stuf line. The censored version by Manga Entertainment only had dubbed audio, while the uncensored version by Critical Mass was available in both dubbed and subtitled formats. The censored version was also released in the United Kingdom by Manga Entertainment. In New Zealand, also released by Manga Entertainment, it was promoted as the banned version from Australia.

The OVAs were released in their uncut version by Manga Entertainment in France in 1999 and by Fox Pathé Europa in 2003, and in Italy by Shin Vision also in 2003.

The first release by Manga Entertainment was cut in most countries where it was released (USA, United Kingdom, New Zealand). In the UK release, the cuts amount to 30 in Evil Town of an already cut version for a total of 4:25 mins, 6:43 mins in Hell's Wind, and 25 in Slumking (Harem Bomber) and are related to sex, violence, bondage and cannibalism. The US version also has similar cuts.

The OVA with most censorship problems was Violence Jack: Evil Town. When Manga Entertainment submitted this OVA to the Australian Classification Board in 1997, the OVA was refused a rating. It is suspected that this version was the already censored version from the UK (the print reviewed ran 55 mins, whereas the original print runs 60 mins). Since this OVA was banned, the release of the rest was scrapped.

The OVAs were released uncut in Italy and France. In the United States it was also released uncut by Right Stuf under the Critical Mass label. Discotek Media released the OVA series uncut in 2015.

==== CB Chara Nagai Go World ====
The third OVA of CB Chara Nagai Go World is dedicated to the saga of Violence Jack, where it is confirmed that Jack is Akira Fudo after his battle with Satan.

=== Novels ===
Two novels were written by Yasutaka Nagai with illustrations by Go Nagai and published by Kadokawa Shoten. The first one, Tokyo Metsubo Hen (東京滅亡編) was released in August 1986 while the second one, Kanto Slum-gai Hen (関東スラム街編, kantō suramu gai hen), was released in April 1987.

In July 1995, another novel titled Violence Jack: Golden City (バイオレンスジャック 黄金都市編, baiorensu jakku ōgon toshi hen), written by Tatsuhiko Dan with illustration by Go Nagai, was released by Kodansha.

== Legacy ==
Violence Jack is credited with creating the post-apocalyptic manga and anime genre. It depicted its post-apocalyptic setting as a desert wasteland with biker gangs, anarchic violence, ruined buildings, innocent civilians, tribal chiefs, and small abandoned villages. This was similar to, and may have influenced, the desert wasteland settings of later post-apocalyptic franchises such as the Australian film series Mad Max (1979 debut) and the Japanese manga and anime series Fist of the North Star (Hokuto no Ken, 1983 debut). Goichi Suda (Suda 51), who cited Violence Jack as an influence on his video game series No More Heroes (2007 debut), stated: “All of the desert-setting titles are actually inspired by Violence Jack. That came way before Hokuto no Ken, so that's the real origin of everything. It's a great Japanese comic.”

Kentaro Miura, creator of the manga and anime series Berserk (1989 debut), cited Violence Jack as an influence. Other Japanese media influenced by Violence Jack include the original video animation M.D. Geist (1986) and the Atlus post-apocalyptic video game series Digital Devil Story: Megami Tensei II (1990 debut).
