= Devilman (film) =

2004 film by Hiroyuki Nasu

- Film poster
- Directed by: Hiroyuki Nasu
- Written by: Machiko Nasu
- Based on: Devilman by Go Nagai
- Produced by: Riuko Tominaga
- Starring: Hisato Izaki; Yusuke Izaki; Ayana Sakai; Asuka Shibuya; Ryudo Uzaki
- Cinematography: Tetsuro Sano
- Edited by: Shinya Kadano
- Production companies: Toei Company; Radgar; TV Asahi; Bandai Visual; Dynamic Planning
- Distributed by: Toei Company
- Release date: 9 October 2004 (Japan)
- Running time: 116 minutes
- Country: Japan
- Language: Japanese
- Budget: ¥1 billion
- Box office: ¥520 million

Devilman (Japanese: デビルマン, Hepburn: Debiruman) is a 2004 Japanese superhero film directed by Hiroyuki Nasu, based on the manga series by Go Nagai.

The film was originally scheduled for a release in May, but was postponed to October 9 due to reshoots. Devilman was panned by critics and audiences, with many considering it as one of the worst Japanese films ever made. It was also a commercial failure, grossing 520 million yen against a 1 billion yen production budget.

== Cast ==
- Hisato Izaki – Akira Fudo (Miki's boyfriend)
- Yusuke Izaki – Ryo Asuka (Akira's best friend)
- Ayana Sakai – Miki Makimura (Akira's girlfriend)
- Asuka Shibuya – Miko
- Ryudo Uzaki – Keisuke Makimura (Miki's father)
- Yoko Aki – Emi Makimura (Miki's mother)
- Ai Tominaga – Silene
- Bob Sapp – World Newscaster/Zennon
- Hiroyuki Matsumoto
- Hirotarō Honda – Professor Asuka
- Mark Musashi – LAPD

== Production ==
Special effects were provided by Toei Company's tokusatsu and anime divisions under the joint name T-Visual.

== Reception ==
The movie topped an annual poll by the magazine Eiga Hihō for the worst movie of the year, attracting five times as many votes as the second-place film, as well as winning first place at the Bunshun Kiichigo Awards and Sports Hochi's Hebi-Ichigo Awards. It was voted the worst Japanese film of the 2000s in an online poll, which noted that the excitement of the manga series getting a film adaptation increased the universal disappointment with the film.

At the 14th Tokyo Sports Film Award awards ceremony, comedian and filmmaker Takeshi Kitano called it "one of the four dumbest movies ever made after Getting Any?, Siberian Express, and Pekin Genjin Who are you?, saying that "there is nothing better than getting drunk and watching this movie." At the same ceremony, actress Sachiko Kobayashi said that she was suddenly called to the set to appear in the movie before she even knew what it was.

The film was universally panned by national newspapers, critics, and fans of the original manga, citing the film's poor CGI, as well as the casting of various nationally popular models and teen idols, many of whom had never acted before. In addition, CGI was allegedly used for the fight scenes because director Hiroyuki Nasu did not know how to direct one with live actors. As the entire story of the manga had been forced into the runtime of a single movie, the plot was criticized for making little to no sense. It was also noted that the design of Silene on the poster was completely different to her appearance in the movie. Yuichi Maeda gave this movie 2 points out of 100 on his blog, stating that the only thing good about this movie was the poster and the concept design. Comedian Hiroshi Yamamoto created a dedicated section of his website to collect bad reviews of the movie, linking to several national newspapers, as well as links to around 100 blog entries from various film critics.

The movie has since become a benchmark in Japan for the reception of live action movies, with What to Do with the Dead Kaiju? in particular being dubbed "The Devilman of the Reiwa Era" by online users.

== See also ==
- List of films considered the worst
