= Devilman =

Japanese manga series and franchise

- First tankōbon volume cover, featuring Akira Fudo (foreground) and Devilman (background)

デビルマン (Debiruman)
- Genre: Apocalyptic; Dark fantasy; Superhero
- Manga
- Written by: Go Nagai
- Published by: Kodansha
- English publisher: NA: Seven Seas Entertainment
- Magazine: Weekly Shōnen Magazine
- Original run: June 11, 1972 – June 24, 1973
- Volumes: 5
Further information
Anime television series
Directed by	Masayuki Akehi; Tomoharu Katsumata
Produced by	Ken Ariga; Yoshifumi Hatano
Written by	Masaki Tsuji
Music by	Goh Misawa
Studio	Toei Animation
Licensed by	NA: Discotek Media
Original network	ANN (NET)
Original run	July 8, 1972 – April 7, 1973
Episodes	39
Manga
Shin Devilman
Written by	Yasutaka Nagai
Illustrated by	Go Nagai
Published by	Kodansha
English publisher	NA: Verotik
Magazine	Shōnen Magazine Special
Original run	May 25, 1979 – May 8, 1981
Volumes	1
Novel series
Shin Devilman
Written by	Yasutaka Nagai
Illustrated by	Go Nagai
Published by	Asahi Sonorama
Imprint	Sonorama Bunko
Original run	May 13, 1981 – March 31, 1982
Volumes	4
Novel
Devilman: The Birth
Written by	Yasutaka Nagai
Illustrated by	Kazuo Komatsubara
Published by	Kodansha
Published	July 7, 1987
Original video animation
Devilman: The Birth; Devilman: Demon Bird Sirène
Directed by	Umanosuke Iida
Produced by	Toshio Tanaka; Ryohei Suzuki; Katsuhiko Hasegawa; Koichi Murata
Written by	Go Nagai; Umanosuke Iida
Music by	Kenji Kawai
Studio	Oh! Production
Licensed by	AUS: Madman Entertainment; NA: Discotek Media; UK: Manga Entertainment
Released	November 1, 1987 (The Birth); February 25, 1990 (Demon Bird Sirène)
Runtime	50 minutes
Episodes	2
Novel series
Devilman: The Novel
Written by	Yasutaka Nagai
Illustrated by	Go Nagai
Published by	MediaWorks
Imprint	Dengeki Bunko
Original run	May 25, 1999 – August 25, 1999
Volumes	4
Manga
Neo Devilman
Written by	Various (anthology)
Published by	Kodansha
Original run	June 21, 1999 – February 21, 2000
Volumes	3
Manga
Demon Knight
Written by	Go Nagai
Published by	Kodansha
Magazine	Mandala
Original run	March 23, 2007 – July 3, 2009
Manga
Devilman vs. Getter Robo
Written by	Go Nagai
Illustrated by	Dynamic Pro
Published by	Akita Shoten
Magazine	Champion Red
Published	2010
Volumes	1
Manga
Silene-chan
Written by	Go Nagai
Published by	Nihon Bungeisha
Magazine	Comic Heaven
Original run	August 9, 2012 – February 9, 2013
Manga
Devilman Gaiden: Ningen Senki
Written by	Fujihiko Hosono
Published by	Kodansha
Magazine	Monthly Young Magazine
Original run	January 23, 2023 – June 20, 2023
- Spin-off manga
- Devil Lady (1997–2000); Amon: The Darkside of the Devilman (1999–2004); Devilman Grimoire (2012–2013); Devilman vs. Hades (2012–2014); Devilman Saga (2014–2020)
- Crossover anime
- Mazinger Z vs. Devilman (1973); Cyborg 009 VS Devilman (2015)
- Live-action film
- Devilman (2004)
- ONA
- Devilman Crybaby (2018)
- icon

Devilman (Japanese: デビルマン, Hepburn: Debiruman) is a Japanese manga series written and illustrated by Go Nagai. It follows high school student Akira Fudo, who absorbs the powers of the demon called "Amon" with help of his friend Ryo Asuka, in order to battle creatures hidden in human society, thus calling himself the "Devilman" in the process. The series was originally ordered by Toei Animation as a toned-down anime version of Nagai's previous manga series, Demon Lord Dante, although Devilman ended up having a darker tone which reflected Nagai's anti-war sentiments.

Devilman's 39-episode anime series was developed by Toei Animation in 1972, while Nagai's manga in Kodansha's Weekly Shōnen Magazine debuted barely a month before the anime series started. The manga was published between June 1972 and June 1973, while multiple publishers have released it in collected tankōbon volumes. Seven Seas Entertainment published the English translation of the original manga in two volumes in 2018. The series has since spawned numerous original video animations (OVAs), manga spin-offs, novels, films, and a sequel. Devilman and other characters from the series have made numerous cameo appearances in Nagai's other works. The most notable is Tomoharu Katsumata's 1973 feature film Mazinger Z vs. Devilman, which features Devilman teaming up with Nagai's titular robot to fight Dr. Hell. In 2018, a remake titled Devilman Crybaby directed by Masaaki Yuasa was released, functioning as an alternate, modernized retelling of the manga.

Devilman is among Nagai's most popular and influential works. The manga has sold 50 million copies worldwide. Although the artwork was polarizing, critics praised the series for Nagai's darker take on superhero tropes and noted its graphic violence. The series' themes and Akira's design have influenced multiple other series such as Neon Genesis Evangelion and X.

== Plot ==
=== Manga ===
Akira Fudo is a shy teenager who lives in his friend Miki Makimura's house as his parents work abroad. One day, Akira's childhood friend Ryo Asuka reveals that the Earth is about to be invaded by demons, monstrous beings who have been hibernating for centuries. The only way to defeat them is to take control of their powers and fight them on equal terms. Ryo then involves his friend in a ritual called the Black Sabbath, an event where numerous demons plan to merge with humans to infiltrate society. During the Black Sabbath, Akira merges with Amon, a demon warrior both idolized and feared among his kind for his incredible strength. However, instead of Amon holding control over Akira, the latter's pure soul triumphs over that of Amon, bringing the demon to heel and creating Devilman.

After fighting out of the Black Sabbath, Akira uses his demon persona to battle multiple enemies hidden in society. However, Akira starts to question his methods after he encounters Sirene and Kaim, two demons whose relationship with one another challenged Akira's prior perception of all demons being immoral, and the cruel Jinmen, a turtle-like demon who contained the still-living souls of his human victims on his shell, forcing Akira to destroy them to defeat him. A large detachment of demons led by the demon Lord Zennon invades Tokyo, alerting the world's population to the existence of demons. Akira learns that other humans are becoming Devilmen, and resolves to contact them to form a team dedicated to protecting humankind from the demons.

Meanwhile, Ryo journeys back to the mansion where he informed Akira of the world of demons, and finds an album supposedly about his life, which states he died years ago in a car accident. During his ensuing existential crisis, Ryo is met by a group of demons led by the demoness Psycho Jenny, who tells Ryo he is actually Satan, a fallen angel who sympathized with the demons and turned on God for wanting to exterminate them. As part of Satan's plan to lead an all-out war on humanity, he had Psycho Jenny erase his memories and replace them with those of Ryo Asuka until the time when he was ready to begin the war. During a television broadcast, Ryo reveals the existence of Devilmen to the public but does not differentiate them from demons when he shows footage of Akira's first transformation. This leads to a mass hysteria that causes humans to turn on each other worldwide.

While Akira confronts Ryo for answers and learns the truth of his former friend's identity, a mob of humans kills Miki and her family for being associated with him. With Miki's death, Akira sinks into despair and loses faith in humanity before vowing to get revenge on Satan. When asked by Zennon about why he wanted Akira to survive humankind's extinction by becoming a Devilman, Satan implies that the reason is that he loved Akira and wanted to protect him. Twenty years pass, and all humans, save for the Devilmen recruited by Akira, are extinct. During their final battle, the Devilmen and the demons are both annihilated, and Satan mortally wounds Akira. Satan then realizes that what he did to humankind was no different from what God did to demons, and grieves over Akira's death as God's angels descend upon the Earth.

=== Anime ===
Devilman is sent by the Demon Lord Zennon to lead a full-scale invasion of the human world. After he ambushes and kills Akira and his father in the Himalayas, not far from the base of operations of the Demon Tribe, he selects Akira as his host, restoring him to life, but giving him a wild and unpredictable streak. However, after returning to Japan, Akira encounters and falls in love with Miki Makimura. Devilman is then tamed by his desire to protect her. Devilman resolves to defect from his orders and fight against the Demon Tribe.

== Production ==
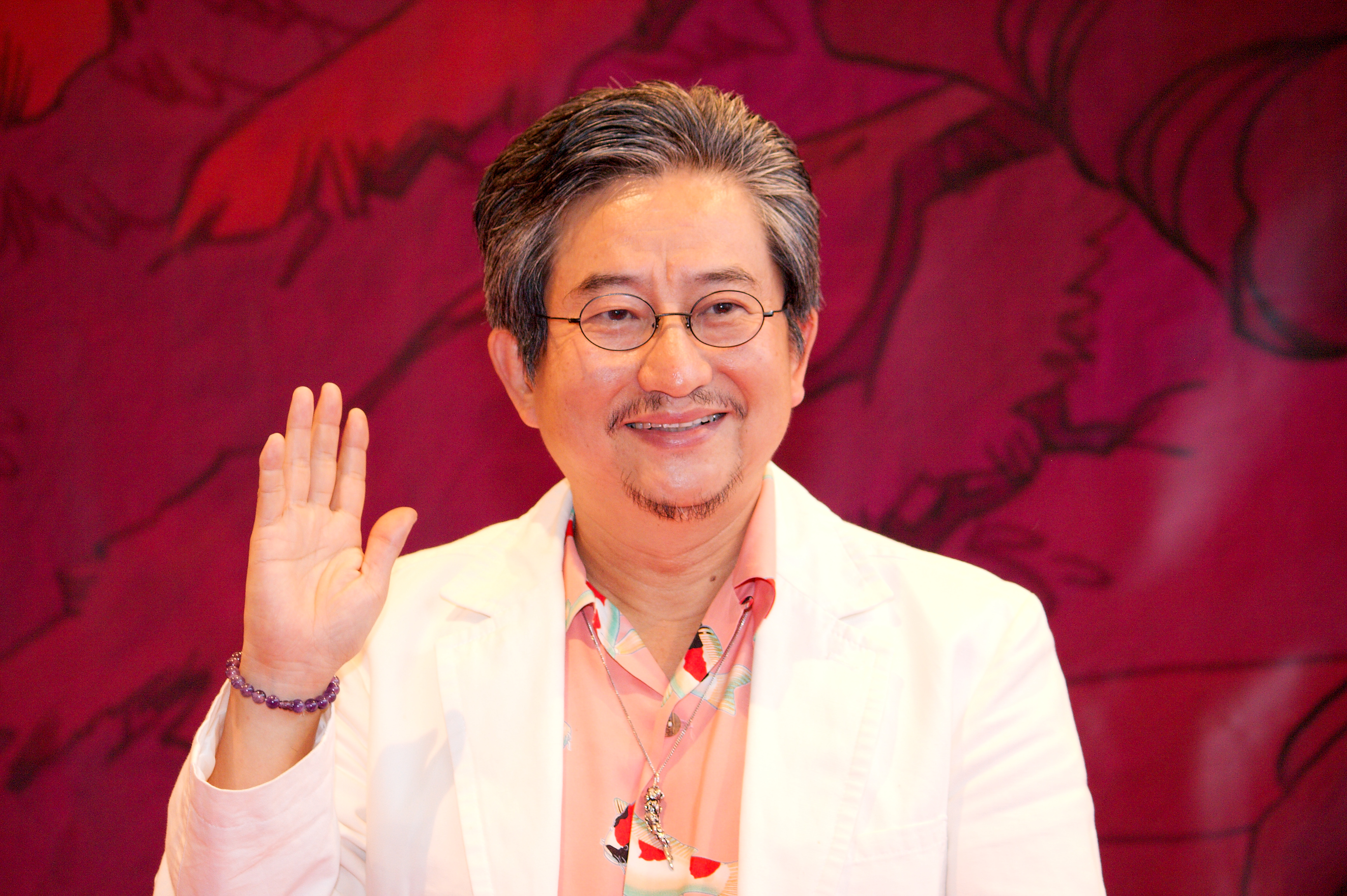
Go Nagai, the creator of Devilman

Devilman evolved from Go Nagai's previous manga, Demon Lord Dante, after Toei Animation approached Nagai about turning Dante into a television series. The producers wanted certain elements toned down, and a more human-like anti-hero created. Devilman was born as a result of this. Devilman's outfit seems be inspired by a villain from the 1972 Gekko Kamen anime. Go Nagai worked on the anime's scenario along with renowned screenwriter and science-fiction novelist Masaki Tsuji, who wrote the scripts for 35 of the TV series' 39 episodes. Along with the television series, Devilman was also produced as a serialized manga in Weekly Shōnen Magazine beginning in 1972. Go Nagai designed the manga to be more horror-like and mature than the anime version. When developing the Devilman manga, Nagai was told by his editor to write an alternative take of the anime aimed towards a more mature audience.

Nagai designed Devilman as an anti-war work; the fusion of humans and demons is an analogy for the draft, and Miki's violent death symbolizes the death of peace. "There is no justice in war, any war," wrote Nagai, "nor is there any justification for human beings killing one another. Devilman carries a message of warning, as we step toward a bright future."

In further exploring themes of war, Nagai stated that he wrote this manga to alert the world in regards of the narrative's chaos possibly happening in the real world. He further stated that despite Satan's actions in the manga, he was not a stereotypical villain as Nagai believes that God would fit more into this category as a result for the actions he committed against demons years before the series' start.

== Media ==
=== Manga ===
The manga was originally published by Kodansha from June 11, 1972, to June 24, 1973, in Weekly Shōnen Magazine. The series has been published in tankōbon format several times, most of them by Kodansha. Starting with the 1987 publishing, most Kodansha editions include Shin Devilman, which originally was not meant to be included in the canon of the original series, as a part of the volumes. The manga has been translated into English in a series of five bilingual manga volumes published by Kodansha.

The manga has also been published along with Cutie Honey in the magazine Gekkan Kanzenban Devilman x Cutie Honey (月刊完全版デビルマン×キューティーハニー, gekkan kanzenban debiruman x kyūteī hanī) published by JIVE during 2004 in order to take advantage of the release of the live-action films of both series.

Seven Seas Entertainment published the English translation of the original manga in two volumes in 2018, and of Devilman G and Devilman VS. Hades in 2017 and 2018.

==== Spin-offs ====
Shin Devilman (新デビルマン, Shin Debiruman) was originally published in Kodansha's Shōnen Magazine Special on May 25, 1979, January 25, 1980, September 15, 1980, March 6, 1981, and May 8, 1981. All chapters were drawn by Go Nagai, but the first chapter was written in collaboration with Masaki Tsuji, while chapters two and three were written by Hiroshi Koenji. The rest of the chapters were done by Nagai. The manga is sometimes known as Devilman 2 and Neo Devilman.

A one-shot, which is not originally part of Shin Devilman, but that has always been compiled along with the series in tankōbon, was published in the magazine Variety by Kadokawa Shoten. This 16-page story does not have any text and it presents the moments of Akira after the death of Miki in the original series, but before the battle with Satan, as he buries the remains of Miki and encounters Ryo.

Go Nagai published the manga Devilman Saga in Shogakukan's Big Comic from December 25, 2014, to March 10, 2020. The story takes place in the year 2025, a roboticist named Fudou Yuuki joins a project involving a large mural depicting humanity's true past as well as the ancient but advanced technology found in Antarctica. Shogakukan compiled its chapters into thirteen tankōbon volumes, released from June 30, 2015, to May 29, 2020.

A manga series written and illustrated by Fujihiko Hosono, titled Devilman Gaiden: Ningen Senki, was serialized in Kodansha's Monthly Young Magazine from January 23, 2023, to June 20 of the same year.

=== Animated adaptations ===
The anime television series was 39 episodes long and ran from July 8, 1972, to April 7, 1973, on NET (now TV Asahi). Outside Japan, the TV series was broadcast in Italy in 1983 and enjoyed great popularity there. A DVD box set of the series was released in Japan on September 21, 2002. The TV series has been licensed for the first time in North America by Discotek Media who released the series on DVD in 2014.

Devilman: The Birth (デビルマン 誕生編, Debiruman Tanjō Hen) was released on November 1, 1987, by King Records. It was followed by Devilman: Demon Bird Sirène (デビルマン 妖鳥シレーヌ編, Debiruman Yōchō Shirēnu Hen), released on February 25, 1990, by Bandai Visual. Kazuo Komatsubara, an animation director on the original TV series, was the character designer for the OVAs, which were animated by his Oh Production.

Both were directed by Umanosuke Iida (credited under his birth name, Tsutomu Iida) and were closely developed in conjunction with Nagai himself. The OVAs' plot revolves around Akira's transformation into Devilman up until his battle with Sirène. Besides a few minor alterations, the OVAs are faithful to the original manga. Both OVAs were released on Laserdisc and on a single DVD by Bandai Visual on March 28, 2003. The two OVAs were also the only Devilman anime to have been commercially released in the United States (by Manga Entertainment) prior to 2014. The DVD release included only the English-dubbed version (the original Japanese version was previously released on VHS in 1995 by L.A. Hero and Dark Image Entertainment).

In 2000, Amon: Apocalypse of Devilman was released as a pay-per-view event in Japan and was later released on video and DVD. Based on Amon: The Darkside of The Devilman, it covers the period between the humans becoming aware of demons and the semi-final battle between Devilman and Amon, who was unleashed after Akira became demoralized by witnessing the death of Miki. In the final battle, Amon is subdued and remerges with Akira, but instead of Akira then proceeding to battle Satan, he rejects the latter's challenge, and walks away into the wreckage of Tokyo.

In 2015, Cyborg 009 VS Devilman was released. The three-episode OVA features the Devilman series crossing over with Shotaro Ishinomori's Cyborg 009, with the titular characters from each series becoming rivals before working together to bring down a joint threat.

A 10-episode original net animation adaptation produced by Science Saru and directed by Masaaki Yuasa, titled Devilman Crybaby, was released worldwide on January 5, 2018, exclusively on Netflix.

=== Films ===
Mazinger Z Vs. Devilman is a crossover animated film between Devilman and Mazinger Z produced by Toei and released on July 18, 1973. While the film stars the majority of the characters from each series, it features alternative versions of the events from both, and is therefore not canonical to either one.

On October 9, 2004, a live-action tokusatsu film directed by Hiroyuki Nasu was theatrically released in Japan. The film starred Hisato Izaki as Devilman, Yūsuke Izaki as Ryo Asuka and Ayana Sakai as Miki Makimura. The cast also included AV Idol Maria Yumeno. The film was criticized for its poor special effects and the casting of various popular celebrities with no prior acting experience.

=== Music ===
A large number of soundtrack albums have been released since the beginning of the original series.

Title	Format	Company	Standard number	Release date
Devilman	Flexi disc	Asahi Sonorama	APM-4016	July 10, 1972
Devilman	EP record	Columbia	SCS-502	August 10, 1972
TV Original BGM Collection: Devilman	LP album	Columbia	CX-7088	March 1983
TV Original BGM Collection: Devilman	CD	Columbia	28CC-2295	May 21, 1988
TV Animation Drama Series: Devilman	CD	Columbia	COCC-12398	March 1, 1995
Animex 1200 Series 71: Devilman	CD	Columbia	COCC-72071	September 22, 2004
Original Soundtrack Devilman Tanjo Hen Ongakushu	LP album	King Records	K20G-7359	1987
Original Soundtrack Devilman Tanjo Hen Ongakushu	CD	King Records	K30X-7094	November 1987
Visual Sound Series Devilman Shin Mokushiroku	CD	King Records	K32X-7055	1987
Devilman Tanjo Hen / Yocho Sirène Hen	CD	King Records	KICA-10	March 21, 1990
Devilman Densetsu ~ The Legends of Devilman	CD	Pony Canyon	FSCA-10054	October 21, 1998
Nagai Go Hero Densetsu Onkyo Geki Devilman Armageddon Hen	CD	First Smile Entertainment	FSCA-10209	February 20, 2002
Devilman Densetsu + 3 ~ The Legends of Devilman	CD	BeeSmile	BSCH-30011	March 10, 2004
Eternal Edition Dynamic Pro Films Files No.11 & 12: Devilman	CD	Columbia	COCX-32285/6	July 23, 2003
"Devilman no Uta" (21st century ver.)	CD single	TEAM Entertainment	KDSD-95	February 22, 2006
"Hikari no Naka de"	CD single	Sonic Groove	AVCD-16051	September 23, 2004
Devilman Original Soundtrack	CD	avex trax	AVCD-17543	October 6, 2004

=== In other media ===
Three novels have been released. The first one Shin Devilman (真・デビルマン, Shin Debiruman) was written by Go Nagai's brother Yasutaka Nagai with illustrations by Go. It was originally published in 1981 by Asahi Sonorama in four books. It is not related to the manga Shin Devilman, from which some chapters were also written by Yasutaka. With the release of the first OVA, in 1987 a single volume novel based on it was released by Kodansha titled Shin Video Shosetsu – Devilman: Tanjo Hen (新ビデオ小説 デビルマン 誕生編, shin bideo shousetsu debiruman tanjou hen). It was also written by Yasutaka Nagai, but it had illustrations by the OVA's main designer, Kazuo Komatsubara. In 1999 a second novelization of 4 volumes titled Devilman: The Novel (デビルマン The Novel) was published by MediaWorks and once again written by Yasutaka and illustrated by Go. All three series of novels are unrelated to each other even though all were written by Yasutaka Nagai.

A video game based on Devilman was released for the Famicom by Namco on April 25, 1989. Bandai also released a game based on Devilman for the Sony PlayStation on April 13, 2000. Along with several of Nagai's other creations, Devilman appeared in the Japanese Super Famicom game CB Chara Wars: Ushinawareta Gag (CBキャラウォーズ 失われたギャーグ, CB Kyarauōzu Ushinawareta Gyāgu).

Devilman and other characters from the series have shown up in cameo appearances numerous times in Go Nagai's other works. Miki is the first female protagonist of the 1974 manga Oira Sukeban, and Akira has appeared in various incarnations of Cutie Honey, most notably the 1994 OVA New Cutie Honey. Miki and Ryo Asuka also appear as dogs (with dog-like bodies and human heads) in the Violence Jack manga. In 1997, Nagai created Devil Lady, based on his idea of if the main character was a woman. The Devil Lady series contains its own original story that stands out from the Devilman series. Fudo's silhouette briefly appears in the opening credits of Devil Lady. The cast of Devilman also crossed over with characters from Mazinger Z and Violence Jack in the 1991 OVA CB Chara Nagai Go World. This release featured the familiar characters in comical and lighthearted antics in super deformed forms. In this series, it is revealed that Violence Jack is a future version of Akira Fudo. It is also revealed that Miki is an otaku and that she knew of Akira's identity as Devilman due to reading the manga offscreen.

== Reception ==
By March 2017, Devilman had over 50 million copies in circulation. In 2018, Anime News Network listed Devilman among the seven "Best New Manga for Grown-Ups".

Critical response initially focused on Akira's personality and the controversial themes portrayed before Akira becomes Devilman. Zona Negativa found the narrative simple since Akira and Ryo learn about the demons and through a party that involves orgies and other controversial themes Nagai is famous for. Anime News Network initially referred to Akira as an appealing hero based on his kind demeanor, but criticized his relationship with Miki due to how she berates these traits. As a result, when Akira becomes a more violent person due to absorbing Amon, the review believes Nagai was expressing the idea of a man undergoing growth but still retaining his kind self. Although Akira and Ryo's relationship is not fully explored, the review felt there was a homoerotic tension between them that was interesting for readers. Manga News found the manga's prologue outstanding based on how Akira becomes a Devilman and how psychologically it affects him.

The dark narrative presented in general was noted especially during Miki's death which felt to Jason Thompson ANN to look "like a visualization of a child's nightmare". In the book Manga Design, Masanao Amano and Julius Wiedemann found the twist involving humans killing other humans as a major plot twist that shocked the audience as well as next generation manga artists, comparing it to witch-hunting. The Fandom Post also found the manga to be too gruesome but hoped that more people read it if they can get past its gore. He also praised Nagai's art for the horror presented and brutal fight scenes. Manga News was shocked that despite Akira's belief in mankind, he sees a disturbing scenario caused by the war between men and devils, resulting in one of the deepest and saddest endings in manga history. Thompson was more critical to Nagai's art, stating "his characters' eyes rarely seem to be looking in the same direction, their limbs look like pipe cleaners, and the women are like blow-up dolls with apples glued to their chests."

Although its controversial depiction of violence made it a major target of protest for PTAs and other groups, the storyline in Devilman made it stand apart from other manga of the time and it impacted the industry as a whole. Devilman was ranked fifth in Mania Entertainment's 10 Most Iconic Anime Heroes written by Thomas Zoth who commented that "Shonen manga developed a dark tone with Devilman's graphic violence, casual blasphemy, and theme of using evil itself to fight evil." Jason Huff of The Anime Review Notes "a couple of enjoyable bits" in the OVA adaptation, yet ultimately recommends Vampire Hunter D instead "if you want to see a splatterfest of grotesque monsters getting all gooey and split in two". Helen McCarthy and Jonathan Clements of The Anime Encyclopedia said that the series was brought down by "the messy confluence of Japanese and European mythology".

=== Legacy ===
A character designer from SNK admitted that Devilman was an influence in designing Kyo Kusanagi. Manga writer Nanase Ohkawa claimed that Devilman was the manga that shocked her the most as a child. Ohkawa was eventually influenced by Devilman to write X due to the themes employed in both manga, most notably the Armageddon. Neon Genesis Evangelion director Hideaki Anno said the mecha Evangelion Unit 01 was influenced by Devilman. Anno claims that Devilman's scary facial expressions were the basis for the mecha alongside Mazinger Z. For the film 2011 Tekken: Blood Vengeance, the fighter Jin Kazama achieves a demonic form designed by Takayuki Takeya, who is famous designing characters from Devilman and Kamen Rider.
