= 10th Crunchyroll Anime Awards =

2026 award ceremony

- Awarded for: Excellence in anime
- Date: May 23, 2026
- Location: Grand Prince Hotel New Takanawa, Tokyo, Japan
- Country: United States
- Hosted by: Sally Amaki; Jon Kabira

Highlights
- Most wins: Demon Slayer: Kimetsu no Yaiba – The Movie: Infinity Castle (7)
- Most nominations: Dandadan (20)
- Anime of the Year: My Hero Academia
- Film of the Year: Demon Slayer: Kimetsu no Yaiba – The Movie: Infinity Castle
- Website: Crunchyroll Anime Awards

The 10th Crunchyroll Anime Awards was held on May 23, 2026, at the Grand Prince Hotel Takanawa in Tokyo, Japan. This edition celebrated the 10th anniversary of the awards which first held in 2017, and featured 32 categories from the previous ceremony honoring anime released from January to December 2025. The ceremony was streamed live by Crunchyroll on YouTube, Twitch, and TikTok. Sally Amaki and Jon Kabira were hosted the ceremony for the fourth consecutive year. Crunchyroll reported that 73 million votes from around the world were submitted, with the majority of them coming from Brazil, Germany, India, Mexico, and the United States.

The eighth and final season of My Hero Academia by Bones Film won four awards including Anime of the Year, becoming the first concluding season of an anime series to win the award. Ufotable's Demon Slayer: Kimetsu no Yaiba – The Movie: Infinity Castle received the most wins with seven, including Film of the Year. Meanwhile, the second season of The Apothecary Diaries by Toho Animation Studio and OLM won five including Best Drama and Best Director. Other winners include Dandadan by Science SARU which received the most nominations for the second consecutive year with 20, as well as Gachiakuta, Solo Leveling, Chainsaw Man – The Movie: Reze Arc, Spy × Family, One Piece, Lazarus, Re:Zero – Starting Life in Another World, The Fragrant Flower Blooms with Dignity, and Sakamoto Days.

== Winners and nominees ==
Nominees were announced on April 2, 2026, in a livestream at Crunchyroll's YouTube channel. For the second consecutive year, Dandadan received the most nominations with 20, followed by The Apothecary Diaries at 17, Gachiakuta at 16, and My Hero Academia at 15. The four anime series were nominated for Anime of the Year, together with Takopi's Original Sin and The Summer Hikaru Died. All Anime of the Year nominees, except The Apothecary Diaries and The Summer Hikaru Died, were also nominated on the Best Animation category, together with One Piece and Solo Leveling. One Piece was nominated in the Best Continuing Series category for the fourth consecutive year. Naoyuki Onda and Yukiko Nakatani received their second nomination in Best Character Design for their respective work on Dandadan and The Apothecary Diaries; the two series were also nominated again in Best Background Art, while Fūga Yamashiro and Norihiro Naganuma received a second consecutive nomination in Best Director, respectively. Chainsaw Man – The Movie: Reze Arc also received the most nominations for a film with 13; Kensuke Ushio was nominated for the second consecutive year in the Best Score category together with his other work Dandadan, along with Yuki Kajiura and Go Shiina for Demon Slayer: Kimetsu no Yaiba – The Movie: Infinity Castle and Hiroyuki Sawano for Solo Leveling. Ushio also became the first composer to be nominated twice for the same category in the same year. Aoi Yūki was nominated again in the Best VA Performance (Japanese) category as Maomao.

Among genre categories, Spy × Family was nominated in Best Comedy for the fourth consecutive year, while Dandadan, Kaiju No. 8, and Solo Leveling were nominated in Best Action for the second consecutive year. Re:Zero – Starting Life in Another World and KonoSuba: God's Blessing on This Wonderful World! were nominated again in Best Isekai Anime. Blue Box and The Apothecary Diaries were nominated again in Best Romance and Best Drama respectively. For character categories, Izuku "Deku" Midoriya and Maomao were nominated for Best Main Character and "Must Protect at All Costs" Character. Two characters from both Dandadan (Jin "Jiji" Enjoji and Turbo Granny) and The Apothecary Diaries (Jinshi and Loulan/Shisui), were nominated for Best Supporting Character, while Anya Forger was nominated in the "Must Protect at All Costs" Character category for the fourth consecutive year. Two anime songs nominated for Best Anime Song were nominated for Best Opening Sequence as well: "On the Way" by Aina the End and "Reawaker" by LiSA feat. Felix of Stray Kids. Both the opening and ending themes for Dandadan, Solo Leveling, and My Hero Academia were nominated in their respective categories. Lilas Ikuta received a nomination for Best Anime Song and Best Ending Sequence categories in the same year, while Kenshi Yonezu received two nominations in Best Anime Song for Chainsaw Man – The Movie: Reze Arc.

=== Awards ===
The eighth and final season of My Hero Academia by Bones Film won four awards including Anime of the Year, the first concluding season of an anime series to win the top prize. Demon Slayer: Kimetsu no Yaiba – The Movie: Infinity Castle secured the most wins as well as being the most awarded film in awards history, winning seven including Film of the Year, with its director Haruo Sotozaki and cinematographer Yūichi Terao receiving the award. The Apothecary Diaries won five awards with its directors Akinori Fudesaka and Norihiro Naganuma winning Best Director, while Gachiakuta received three including Best New Series and Best Character Design. One Piece won Best Continuing Series again after losing in the previous ceremony, while Solo Leveling and Lazarus won Best Animation and Best Original Anime respectively. Solo Leveling, The Fragrant Flower Blooms with Dignity, Dandadan, Spy × Family, The Apothecary Diaries, and Re:Zero − Starting Life in Another World won the genre awards for Best Action, Best Romance, Best Comedy, Best Slice of Life, Best Drama, and Best Isekai Anime respectively. Maomao of The Apothecary Diaries won Best Main Character, while Katsuki Bakugo of My Hero Academia won Best Supporting Character. Anya Forger won the "Must Protect at All Costs" Character award for the fourth consecutive year.

"On the Way" by Aina the End and "I" by Bump of Chicken, won the awards for Best Opening Sequence and Best Ending Sequence respectively. "Iris Out" by Kenshi Yonezu won Best Anime Song, while Yuki Kajiura and Go Shiina won Best Score for their work in Demon Slayer: Kimetsu no Yaiba – The Movie: Infinity Castle. Aoi Yūki won Best VA Performance (Japanese) for the second consecutive year as Maomao in The Apothecary Diaries, while Lucien Dodge won Best Voice Acting (English) for his work as Akaza in Demon Slayer: Kimetsu no Yaiba – The Movie: Infinity Castle. Director Tatsuya Nagamine received the Global Impact Award posthumously, which was awarded to honor the works and visionary creatives who have produced anime series changing popular culture. Nagamine's directorial contributions honored his groundbreaking and impactful body of works including Ojamajo Doremi, PreCure, Dragon Ball Super, and One Piece. Nagamine's friend, Masayuki Satō, accepted the award on his behalf.

Winners are listed first, highlighted in boldface, and indicated with a double dagger (‡). The lists are arranged alphabetically, except for the winner.

**Anime of the Year**: **My Hero Academia: Final Season — Bones Film**‡; Dandadan (season 2) — Science SARU; Gachiakuta — Bones Film; Takopi's Original Sin — Enishiya; The Apothecary Diaries (season 2) — Toho Animation Studio and OLM; The Summer Hikaru Died — CygamesPictures	**Film of the Year**: **Demon Slayer: Kimetsu no Yaiba – The Movie: Infinity Castle — Ufotable**‡; 100 Meters — Rock 'n' Roll Mountain; Chainsaw Man – The Movie: Reze Arc — MAPPA; Mononoke the Movie: The Ashes of Rage — EOTA and Crew-Cell; Scarlet — Studio Chizu; The Rose of Versailles — MAPPA
**Best Continuing Series**: **One Piece — Toei Animation**‡; Dandadan (season 2) — Science SARU; Kaiju No. 8 (season 2) — Production I.G; My Hero Academia: Final Season — Bones Film; Solo Leveling: Arise from the Shadow — A-1 Pictures; Spy × Family (season 3) — Wit Studio and CloverWorks	**Best New Series**: **Gachiakuta — Bones Film**‡; Clevatess — Lay-duce; Sakamoto Days — TMS Entertainment; Takopi's Original Sin — Enishiya; The Fragrant Flower Blooms with Dignity — CloverWorks; The Summer Hikaru Died — CygamesPictures
**Best Original Anime**: **Lazarus — MAPPA**‡; Apocalypse Hotel — CygamesPictures; Digimon Beatbreak — Toei Animation; Mobile Suit Gundam GQuuuuuuX — Sunrise and Studio Khara; Moonrise — Wit Studio; Zenshu — MAPPA	**Best Animation**: **Solo Leveling: Arise from the Shadow — A-1 Pictures**‡; Dandadan (season 2) — Science SARU; Gachiakuta — Bones Film; My Hero Academia: Final Season — Bones Film; One Piece — Toei Animation; Takopi's Original Sin — Enishiya
**Best Character Design**: **Gachiakuta — Satoshi Ishino, original designs by Kei Urana**‡; Dandadan (season 2) — Naoyuki Onda, original designs by Yukinobu Tatsu; My Dress-Up Darling (season 2) — Kazumasa Ishida, original designs by Shinichi Fukuda; One Piece — Midori Matsuda, original designs by Eiichiro Oda; Takopi's Original Sin — Keita Nagahara, original designs by Taizan 5; The Apothecary Diaries (season 2) — Yukiko Nakatani, original designs by Touko Shino	**Best Director**: **Akinori Fudesaka and Norihiro Naganuma — The Apothecary Diaries (season 2)**‡; Fūga Yamashiro and Abel Góngora — Dandadan (season 2); Fumihiko Suganuma — Gachiakuta; Kenji Nagasaki and Naomi Nakayama — My Hero Academia: Final Season; Ryōhei Takeshita — The Summer Hikaru Died; Shinya Iino — Takopi's Original Sin
**Best Background Art**: **Gachiakuta — Bones Film**‡; City the Animation — Kyoto Animation; Dandadan (season 2) — Science SARU; Kowloon Generic Romance — Arvo Animation; The Apothecary Diaries (season 2) — Toho Animation Studio and OLM; The Summer Hikaru Died — CygamesPictures	**Best Action**: **Solo Leveling: Arise from the Shadow — A-1 Pictures**‡; Dandadan (season 2) — Science SARU; Gachiakuta — Bones Film; Kaiju No. 8 (season 2) — Production I.G; My Hero Academia: Final Season — Bones Film; One Piece — Toei Animation
**Best Comedy**: **Dandadan (season 2) — Science SARU**‡; City the Animation — Kyoto Animation; My Dress-Up Darling (season 2) — CloverWorks; Ranma ½ (season 2) — MAPPA; Spy × Family (season 3) — Wit Studio and CloverWorks; Witch Watch — Bibury Animation Studios	**Best Drama**: **The Apothecary Diaries (season 2) — Toho Animation Studio and OLM**‡; Anne Shirley — The Answer Studio; Blue Box — Telecom Animation Film; Orb: On the Movements of the Earth — Madhouse; Takopi's Original Sin — Enishiya; The Summer Hikaru Died — CygamesPictures
**Best Isekai Anime**: **Re:Zero − Starting Life in Another World (season 3) — White Fox**‡; Campfire Cooking in Another World with My Absurd Skill (season 2) — MAPPA; Disney Twisted-Wonderland: The Animation — Season 1 "Episode of Heartslabyul" — Yumeta Company and Graphinica; From Bureaucrat to Villainess: Dad's Been Reincarnated! — Ajiado; KonoSuba: God's Blessing on This Wonderful World! Bonus Stage (season 3) — Drive; Zenshu — MAPPA	**Best Romance**: **The Fragrant Flower Blooms with Dignity — CloverWorks**‡; Blue Box — Telecom Animation Film; Dandadan (season 2) — Science SARU; Honey Lemon Soda — J.C.Staff; My Dress-Up Darling (season 2) — CloverWorks; Ranma ½ (season 2) — MAPPA
**Best Slice of Life**: **Spy × Family (season 3) — Wit Studio and CloverWorks**‡; Anne Shirley — The Answer Studio; Blue Box — Telecom Animation Film; City the Animation — Kyoto Animation; My Dress-Up Darling (season 2) — CloverWorks; The Fragrant Flower Blooms with Dignity — CloverWorks	**Best Main Character**: **Maomao — The Apothecary Diaries (season 2)**‡; Izuku "Deku" Midoriya — My Hero Academia: Final Season; Ken "Okarun" Takakura — Dandadan (season 2); Momo Ayase — Dandadan (season 2); Rudo Surebrec — Gachiakuta; Sung Jin-woo — Solo Leveling: Arise from the Shadow
**Best Supporting Character**: **Katsuki Bakugo — My Hero Academia: Final Season**‡; Enjin — Gachiakuta; Jin "Jiji" Enjoji — Dandadan (season 2); Jinshi — The Apothecary Diaries (season 2); Loulan/Shisui — The Apothecary Diaries (season 2); Turbo Granny — Dandadan (season 2)	**"Must Protect at All Costs" Character**: **Anya Forger — Spy × Family (season 3)**‡; Izuku "Deku" Midoriya — My Hero Academia: Final Season; Kaoruko Waguri — The Fragrant Flower Blooms with Dignity; Maomao — The Apothecary Diaries (season 2); Suika — Dr. Stone: Science Future; Takopi — Takopi's Original Sin
**Best Anime Song**: **"Iris Out" by Kenshi Yonezu — Chainsaw Man – The Movie: Reze Arc**‡; "In Bloom" by Lilas Ikuta — The Apothecary Diaries (season 2); "Jane Doe" by Kenshi Yonezu and Hikaru Utada — Chainsaw Man – The Movie: Reze Arc; "On the Way" by Aina the End — Dandadan (season 2); "Reawaker" by LiSA feat. Felix of Stray Kids — Solo Leveling: Arise from the Shadow; "Watch Me!" by Yoasobi — Witch Watch	**Best Score**: **Yuki Kajiura and Go Shiina — Demon Slayer: Kimetsu no Yaiba – The Movie: Infinity Castle**‡; Kensuke Ushio — Chainsaw Man – The Movie: Reze Arc; Kensuke Ushio — Dandadan (season 2); Taku Iwasaki — Gachiakuta; Hiroyuki Sawano — Solo Leveling: Arise from the Shadow; Satoru Kōsaki, Kevin Penkin, and Alisa Okehazama — The Apothecary Diaries (season 2)
**Best Opening Sequence**: **"On the Way" by Aina the End, storyboard and direction by MicAOz — Dandadan (season 2)**‡; "Hugs" by Paledusk, storyboard and direction by Nobutaka Yoda — Gachiakuta; "Mirage" by Creepy Nuts, storyboard and direction by Tetsuya Miyanishi — Call of the Night (season 2); "Reawaker" by LiSA feat. Felix of Stray Kids, storyboard and direction by Shunsuke Nagashige — Solo Leveling: Arise from the Shadow; "The Revo" by Porno Graffitti, storyboard by Naomi Nakayama, direction by Masayuki Otsuki — My Hero Academia: Final Season; "Watch Me!" by Yoasobi, storyboard and direction by Megumi Ishitani — Witch Watch	**Best Ending Sequence**: **"I" by Bump of Chicken, storyboard and direction by Hanako Ueda — My Hero Academia: Final Season**‡; "Actor" by Lilas Ikuta, storyboard and direction by Naoki Miyajima — Spy × Family (season 3); "Beautiful Colors" by OneRepublic, storyboard and direction by Haruo Okuno — Kaiju No. 8 (season 2); "Doukashiteru" by WurtS, storyboard and direction by Komugiko2000 — Dandadan (season 2); "Kawaii Kaiwai" by PiKi, direction by Vivinos — My Dress-Up Darling (season 2); "Un-Apex" by TK from Ling Tosite Sigure, direction by Hiromu Oshiro — Solo Leveling: Arise from the Shadow
**Best VA Performance (Japanese)**: **Aoi Yūki as Maomao — The Apothecary Diaries (season 2)**‡; Chiaki Kobayashi as Yoshiki Tsujinaka — The Summer Hikaru Died; Daiki Yamashita as Izuku "Deku" Midoriya — My Hero Academia: Final Season; Kikunosuke Toya as Denji — Chainsaw Man – The Movie: Reze Arc; Mayumi Tanaka as Monkey D. Luffy — One Piece; Reina Ueda as Reze — Chainsaw Man – The Movie: Reze Arc	**Best VA Performance (English)**: **Lucien Dodge as Akaza — Demon Slayer: Kimetsu no Yaiba – The Movie: Infinity Castle**‡; Alexis Tipton as Reze — Chainsaw Man – The Movie: Reze Arc; Emi Lo as Maomao — The Apothecary Diaries (season 2); Justin Briner as Izuku "Deku" Midoriya — My Hero Academia: Final Season; Morgan Berry as Shiori Fuyumura — Sanda; Paul Castro Jr. as Hikaru Indo — The Summer Hikaru Died
**Best VA Performance (Spanish)**: **Jose Antonio Toledano as Akaza — Demon Slayer: Kimetsu no Yaiba – The Movie: Infinity Castle**‡; Desireé González as Maomao — The Apothecary Diaries (season 2); Dion González as Rudo Surebrec — Gachiakuta; Erika Langarica as Marin Kitagawa — My Dress-Up Darling (season 2); Fernando Moctezuma as Sung Jin-woo — Solo Leveling: Arise from the Shadow; Jessica Ángeles as Reze — Chainsaw Man – The Movie: Reze Arc	**Best VA Performance (Castilian)**: **Carles Teruel as Akaza — Demon Slayer: Kimetsu no Yaiba – The Movie: Infinity Castle**‡; Adrián Pineda as Rudo Surebrec — Gachiakuta; Cristina Peña as Reze — Chainsaw Man – The Movie: Reze Arc; Joel Gómez Jiménez as Ken "Okarun" Takakura — Dandadan (season 2); Marisa Marciel as Nami — One Piece; Marta Barbará as Kaoruko Waguri — The Fragrant Flower Blooms with Dignity
**Best VA Performance (French)**: **Bastien Bourlé as Izuku "Deku" Midoriya — My Hero Academia: Final Season**‡; Bruno Mullenaerts as Enjin — Gachiakuta; Catherine Hanotiau as Nico Wakatsuki — Witch Watch; Clara Soares as Reze — Chainsaw Man – The Movie: Reze Arc; Jonathan Gimbord as Hikaru Indo — The Summer Hikaru Died; Véronique Augereau as Seiko Ayase — Dandadan (season 2)	**Best VA Performance (Arabic)**: **Tariq Obaid as Taro Sakamoto — Sakamoto Days**‡; Hamoud Abu Hassoun as Loid Forger (Childhood) — Spy × Family (season 3); Moataz El-Shazly as Heisuke Mashimo — Sakamoto Days; Raafat Bazo as Yuri Briar — Spy × Family (season 3); Fatima Zakaria as Osaragi — Sakamoto Days; Ghada Omar as Yor Forger — Spy × Family (season 3)
**Best VA Performance (German)**: **Gerrit Schmidt-Foß as Akaza — Demon Slayer: Kimetsu no Yaiba – The Movie: Infinity Castle**‡; Dirk Bublies as Kogoro Mori — Detective Conan: One-eyed Flashback; Laurine Betz as Reze — Chainsaw Man – The Movie: Reze Arc; Magdalena Höfner as Kiui Watase — Jellyfish Can't Swim in the Night; Markus Feustel as Rudo Surebrec — Gachiakuta; Patricia Strasburger as Nico Wakatsuki — Witch Watch	**Best VA Performance (Italian)**: **Mosè Singh as Denji — Chainsaw Man – The Movie: Reze Arc**‡; Katia Sorrentino as Momo Ayase — Dandadan (season 2); Leonardo Graziano as Naruto Uzumaki — Boruto: Naruto the Movie; Luna Fogu as Maomao — The Apothecary Diaries (season 2); Martina Tamburello as Kikoru Shinomiya — Kaiju No. 8; Simone Lupinacci as Izuku "Deku" Midoriya — My Hero Academia: Final Season
**Best VA Performance (Portuguese)**: **Charles Emmanuel as Akaza — Demon Slayer: Kimetsu no Yaiba – The Movie: Infinity Castle**‡; Bruno Sangregório as Levi Ackerman — Attack on Titan: The Last Attack; Erick Bougleux as Zanka Nijiku — Gachiakuta; Fábio Lucindo as Katsuki Bakugo — My Hero Academia: Final Season; Gigi Patta as Maomao — The Apothecary Diaries (season 2); Úrsula Bezerra as Son Goku — Dragon Ball Daima	**Best VA Performance (Hindi)**: **Abhishek Sharma as Jinshi — The Apothecary Diaries (season 2)**‡; Akshita Mishra as Koyuki — Demon Slayer: Kimetsu no Yaiba – The Movie: Infinity Castle; Heena Malik as Reze — Chainsaw Man – The Movie: Reze Arc; Merlyn James as Anya Forger — Spy × Family (season 3); Rajesh Shukla as Sung Jin-woo — Solo Leveling: Arise from the Shadow; Shilpie Pandey as Lufas Maphaahl — A Wild Last Boss Appeared!
**Global Impact Award**: **Tatsuya Nagamine**‡(posthumous award)

=== Anime with multiple nominations and awards ===
Anime with multiple nominations (Note: Includes nominations for multiple seasons as well as related films, if any.)
Nominations	Anime
20	Dandadan
17	The Apothecary Diaries
16	Gachiakuta
15	My Hero Academia
13	Chainsaw Man – The Movie: Reze Arc
10	Solo Leveling
9	Spy × Family
8	The Summer Hikaru Died
8	Demon Slayer: Kimetsu no Yaiba – The Movie: Infinity Castle
7	Takopi's Original Sin
6	My Dress-Up Darling
6	One Piece
5	The Fragrant Flower Blooms with Dignity
5	Witch Watch
4	Kaiju No. 8
4	Sakamoto Days
3	Blue Box
3	City the Animation
2	Anne Shirley
2	Ranma ½
2	Zenshu

Anime with multiple wins (Note: Includes wins for multiple seasons as well as related films, if any.)
Wins	Anime
7	Demon Slayer: Kimetsu no Yaiba – The Movie: Infinity Castle
5	The Apothecary Diaries
4	My Hero Academia
3	Gachiakuta
2	Chainsaw Man – The Movie: Reze Arc
2	Dandadan
2	Solo Leveling
2	Spy × Family

=== Studios with multiple nominations and awards ===
Studios with multiple nominations
Nominations	Studios	Anime(s)
31	Bones Film	Gachiakuta and My Hero Academia
21	MAPPA	Chainsaw Man – The Movie: Reze Arc, Ranma ½, Zenshu, Attack on Titan: The Last Attack, Campfire Cooking in Another World with My Absurd Skill (season 2), Lazarus, and The Rose of Versailles
21	Science SARU	Dandadan and Sanda
20	CloverWorks	Spy × Family, My Dress-Up Darling, and The Fragrant Flower Blooms with Dignity
17	Toho Animation Studio and OLM	The Apothecary Diaries
10	A-1 Pictures	Solo Leveling
10	Wit Studio	Spy × Family and Moonrise
9	CygamesPictures	The Summer Hikaru Died and Apocalypse Hotel
8	Toei Animation	One Piece, Digimon Beatbreak, and Dragon Ball Daima
8	Ufotable	Demon Slayer: Kimetsu no Yaiba – The Movie: Infinity Castle
7	Enishiya	Takopi's Original Sin
6	TMS Entertainment	Sakamoto Days, Detective Conan: One-eyed Flashback, and Dr. Stone
5	Bibury Animation Studios	Witch Watch
4	Production I.G	Kaiju No. 8
3	Kyoto Animation	City the Animation
3	Telecom Animation Film	Blue Box
2	The Answer Studio	Anne Shirley

Studios with multiple wins
Wins	Studios	Anime(s)
7	Bones Film	My Hero Academia and Gachiakuta
7	Ufotable	Demon Slayer: Kimetsu no Yaiba – The Movie: Infinity Castle
5	Toho Animation Studio and OLM	The Apothecary Diaries
3	CloverWorks	Spy × Family and The Fragrant Flower Blooms with Dignity
3	MAPPA	Chainsaw Man – The Movie: Reze Arc and Lazarus
2	A-1 Pictures	Solo Leveling
2	Science SARU	Dandadan
2	Wit Studio	Spy × Family

== Presenters and performers ==
The following individuals, listed in order of appearance, presented awards or a short monologue:

Presenters
Names	Role
Snitchery	Presented the awards for Best Character Design and Best Background Art
Ethan Bortnick	Presented the awards for Best Opening Sequence and Best Main Character
Nyvi Estephan	Presented the awards for "Must Protect at All Costs" Character and Best Action
Danna	Presented the awards for Best Slice of Life and Best Supporting Character
Hannah Bahng	Presented the awards for Best Romance and Best Drama
BamBam	Presented the awards for Best Ending Sequence and Best Comedy
Winston Duke; Rashmika Mandanna	Presented the award for Best Animation
Enako	Presented the award for Best New Series
Nanase Nishino	Presented the award for Best Original Anime
Young Miko; Ten	Presented the award for Best Anime Song
Mitorizu	Presented the award for Best Isekai Anime
RZA; BamBam	Presented the award for Best Score
Sally Amaki; Jon Kabira	Presented the Global Impact Award to Masayuki Satō on behalf of Tatsuya Nagamine
Asuka Saitō	Presented the award for Best Continuing Series
Dean Fujioka	Presented the award for Best Director
Kasumi Arimura	Presented the award for Film of the Year
The Weeknd	Presented the award for Anime of the Year

The following individuals, listed in order of appearance, performed musical numbers:

Performers
Names	Role	Work
Tokyo Philharmonic Orchestra Dean Fujioka	Performers	Orchestral medley to commemorate the previous Anime of the Year winners "History Maker" from Yuri on Ice
Porno Graffitti	Performers	"The Day" and "The Revo" to commemorate the 10th anniversary of My Hero Academia and the series' conclusion
Yoko Takahashi	Performer	"A Cruel Angel's Thesis" to commemorate the 30th anniversary of Neon Genesis Evangelion
Asian Kung-Fu Generation	Performers	"Haruka Kanata" from Naruto "Skins" from the third and final cour in the fourth season of Dr. Stone

== Ceremony information ==
Crunchyroll announced the eligibility period would return to its previous format of eligibility from January to December 2025 for nominations for this edition. This edition celebrated the 10th anniversary of the Crunchyroll Anime Awards which first held in 2017, and featured 32 categories from the previous ceremony. Nominees were revealed on the first day of public voting, April 2. Voting closed on April 15. Presenters for the ceremony on May 23 was announced on April 2, and included presenters such as Tobagonian actor Winston Duke, rapper, producer, and filmmaker RZA, and musician Hannah Bahng, with Sony Group Corporation CEO and President Hiroki Totoki giving opening remarks. Dean Fujioka, Porno Graffitti, Yoko Takahashi, and Asian Kung-Fu Generation were performed in the ceremony for the 10th anniversary of Yuri on Ice and My Hero Academia, the 30th anniversary tribute to Neon Genesis Evangelion featuring its opening theme "A Cruel Angel's Thesis", and the songs "Haruka Kanata" from Naruto and "Skins" from the third and final cour in the fourth season of Dr. Stone respectively. In celebration of the awards, Crunchyroll also announced their partnership with Museum of the Moving Image. In addition to a gallery screening program titled "Anime's Ascendant Decade" held from May 15 to October 12, which includes the full episodes of anime that were either nominated or won from the first edition onwards, the museum's grand Redstone Theater hosted a free live watch party in the same day where the awards was held.

== Reception ==
=== Nominees ===
The lack of an Anime of the Year nomination for Solo Leveling was highlighted, with journalists speculating it may have been in response to the controversy caused by it winning Anime of the Year in the previous year. Piyush Gautam of FandomWire argued that Grand Blue Dreaming was snubbed for Best Comedy, while Secrets of the Silent Witch and Witch Watch were snubbed for Best New Series. He also argued that Bâan: The Boundary of Adulthood was snubbed for Best Original Anime and Spy × Family was snubbed for Anime of the Year. Joshua Fox of Screen Rant argued that Yaiba, Umamusume: Cinderella Gray and Panty & Stocking with Garterbelt were snubbed for a nomination, noting that this created the impression that Crunchyroll is biased against anime for which it does not hold the streaming rights.

Rohit Jaiswar of ComicBook.com noted that four of the six nominees for Best New Series included darker themes, particularly Clevatess and The Summer Hikaru Died. He also discussed Gachiakuta, with its themes of abuse and revenge, and Takopi's Original Sin, which contains bullying, depression, and suicide.

=== Winners ===
My Hero Academia winning Anime of the Year for its eighth and final season caused celebrations by news outlets and fans, as it capped off a ten-year series' run during the anime's tenth anniversary. Hannah Diffey and Joshua Fox of Screen Rant felt that the award was well-deserved, praising its animation and writing. They described it as a "full-circle" moment for the studio Bones Film. Rohit Jaiswar of ComicBook.com wrote that "its victory was not only well-deserved but also a celebration of a true shōnen anime experience that may never be replicated by the new generation".

Some critics felt other anime series worthy of recognition were "overlooked" in favor of popular shows. Ryan Epps of Polygon argued that Apocalypse Hotel, City the Animation, and Orb: On the Movements of the Earth should have won Best Original Anime, Best Comedy, and Best Drama, respectively, due to the impact that they have had. Joshua Fox of Screen Rant felt that City the Animation, The Summer Hikaru Died, and Takopi's Original Sin should have won an award due to the positive reception they received upon release.

=== Exclusion of Japanese audiences ===
In May 2026, during a conference held by the Association of Japanese Animations, Production I.G and Wit Studio president George Wada suggested a "Japanese Anime Awards". Wired Japan described the Crunchyroll Anime Awards as a "strange structural contradiction", in that the ceremony takes place in Japan and involves Japanese media but excludes the Japanese audience due to the service being geoblocked in the country. They also noted that "foreign" news outlets were given preferential treatment over Japanese news outlets. In response on July 4, during the Production I.G and Wit Studio's industry panel held at Anime Expo, Wada announced an event called Tokyo Anime Next, which takes place from October 30 to November 2, 2026. During the final day of the event, a new award show was revealed to be called "Nippon Anime Awards", set to launch at SGC Hall Ariake on November 21, 2027.
