= Reze (Chainsaw Man) =

Fictional character from Chainsaw Man

- Chainsaw Man character
- Reze as illustrated by Tatsuki Fujimoto
- First appearance: Chainsaw Man chapter 40: Love, Flower, Chainsaw (September 30, 2019)
- Created by: Tatsuki Fujimoto
- Portrayed by: Yui Yokoyama (stage play)
- Voiced by: Japanese: Reina Ueda; English: Alexis Tipton

In-universe information
- Species: Devil (Bomb Devil)
- Gender: Female
- Occupation: Café employee
- Nationality: Soviet Union

Reze (Japanese: レゼ) is a fictional character from Tatsuki Fujimoto's manga series Chainsaw Man. She is the main antagonist of the "Bomb Girl Arc". On the surface, she appears to be an ordinary café employee, but her true identity is that she is the Bomb Devil, and she is from the Soviet Union, sent to Japan to seize Denji's heart. Reze is voiced by Reina Ueda in Japanese, and Alexis Tipton in English.

Reze's character received critically acclaimed reviews, for her design, her tragic romance with Denji and fight scenes with many critics considering her one of the best characters in the series and a major breakout character. Her relationship with Denji is heavily praised and is regarded as his closest and most important along aside Aki and Power throughout the manga.

== Creation ==
Manga artist Tatsuki Fujimoto has revealed that Reze was inspired by the heroine of the animated film Jin-Roh: The Wolf Brigade. One of the inspirations for Reze's creation was the idea of Denji meeting and falling in love with another woman, but then Makima would break them up. In an interview for the Chainsaw Man: Reze Arc movie, Fujimoto clarified his thought process on why Denji and Reze didn’t end up together in the end, and said: "I like it when the protagonist and heroine don't end up together and I want them to carry that weight forever. That's why I absolutely didn't want Denji and Reze to get together, or for Reze to become an ally." In an interview in December 2020, Fujimoto revealed that his favorite character is Reze.

=== Casting ===
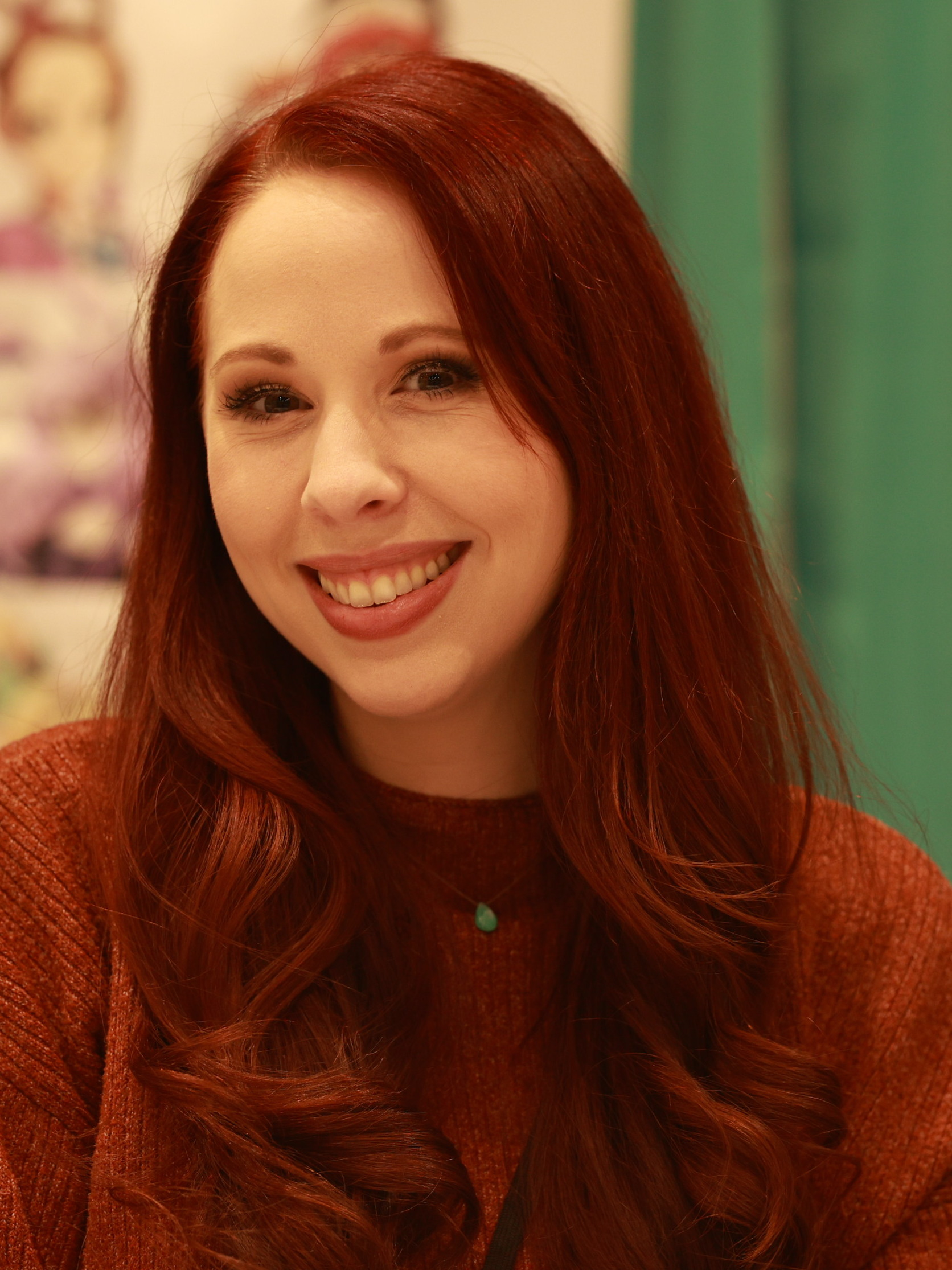
Alexis Tipton, who voice Reze in English

Japanese voice actress Reina Ueda disclosed that she read the original work with the determination to play Reze, which led her to instinctively resonate with the character. Ueda also mentioned that because Reze is a character who joins the story partway through, she worried that she might not be able to make Reze charismatic enough, causing the story to lose its persuasiveness. And also Ueda said about the appearance in the TV series: "I was nervous. The world of Chainsaw Man had already been built by everyone over a whole season. I worried a lot about how I could enter that world as a newcomer. Although Reze is supposed to be the type to take the lead, at first I just wanted to follow along with everyone. I was nervous, but determined to do my best."

Kikunosuke Toya, Denji's voice actor, praised Reze. He talked about Ueda's performance and said, "Reze was so cute. Seriously, she was cute the whole time. The pool scene was incredible, and the direction was excellent."

== Appearances ==
Reze is one of many children taken by the Soviet Union to be subjected to human experimentation, a program aimed at cultivating super-soldiers loyal to the state. She underwent harsh military training to enhance her innate abilities and subsequently succeeded in becoming a Weapon Human fused with the Bomb Devil. One day, Reze encounters Denji while both are taking shelter from the rain in a telephone booth. Her warm and enthusiastic demeanor leads Denji to mistakenly believe she has feelings for him, causing turmoil for him, as he has already developed an affection for Makima. After learning that Reze works as a café waitress, Denji visits the café multiple times to see her. Reze takes the initiative to invite Denji on a date at a school, where she teaches him how to swim. While watching fireworks together at a festival, Reze confesses her feelings to Denji and proposes that they run away together, but Denji refuses. Later, Reze kisses Denji and reveals her true identity as the "Bomb Devil," sent by the Soviet Union to Japan to seize his heart. After multiple battles with Denji, Beam, Aki Hayakawa, and others, Reze is ultimately bound by Denji using chains and thrown into the sea, rendering her unconscious.

After regaining consciousness, Denji proposes that the two of them run away together, but Reze refuses and easily subdues him. Before Reze departs, Denji asks her to meet him at the café. Just as she is about to board a train and escape, Reze has a change of heart and rushes to the café for the meeting, but is intercepted by Makima and the Angel Devil in an alley across from the café. As she attempts to pull the pin on her choker to fight back, she is mortally wounded by the Angel Devil. On the verge of death, she admits that she had never been to school either. Reze's memories are later tampered with by Makima, who then drafts her into "Special Division 5," a unit composed of various Weapon Humans, to confront the fully-formed Chainsaw Man. Following Makima's death, Reze is freed from her control; her whereabouts thereafter remain unknown.

She is shown in a brief flashback during the Aging Devil Arc as Denji remembers her from the Bitterness Devil, labeling her as one of the people in his life he loves alongside Aki and Power and that he never stopped loving her after all this time.

== Reception ==
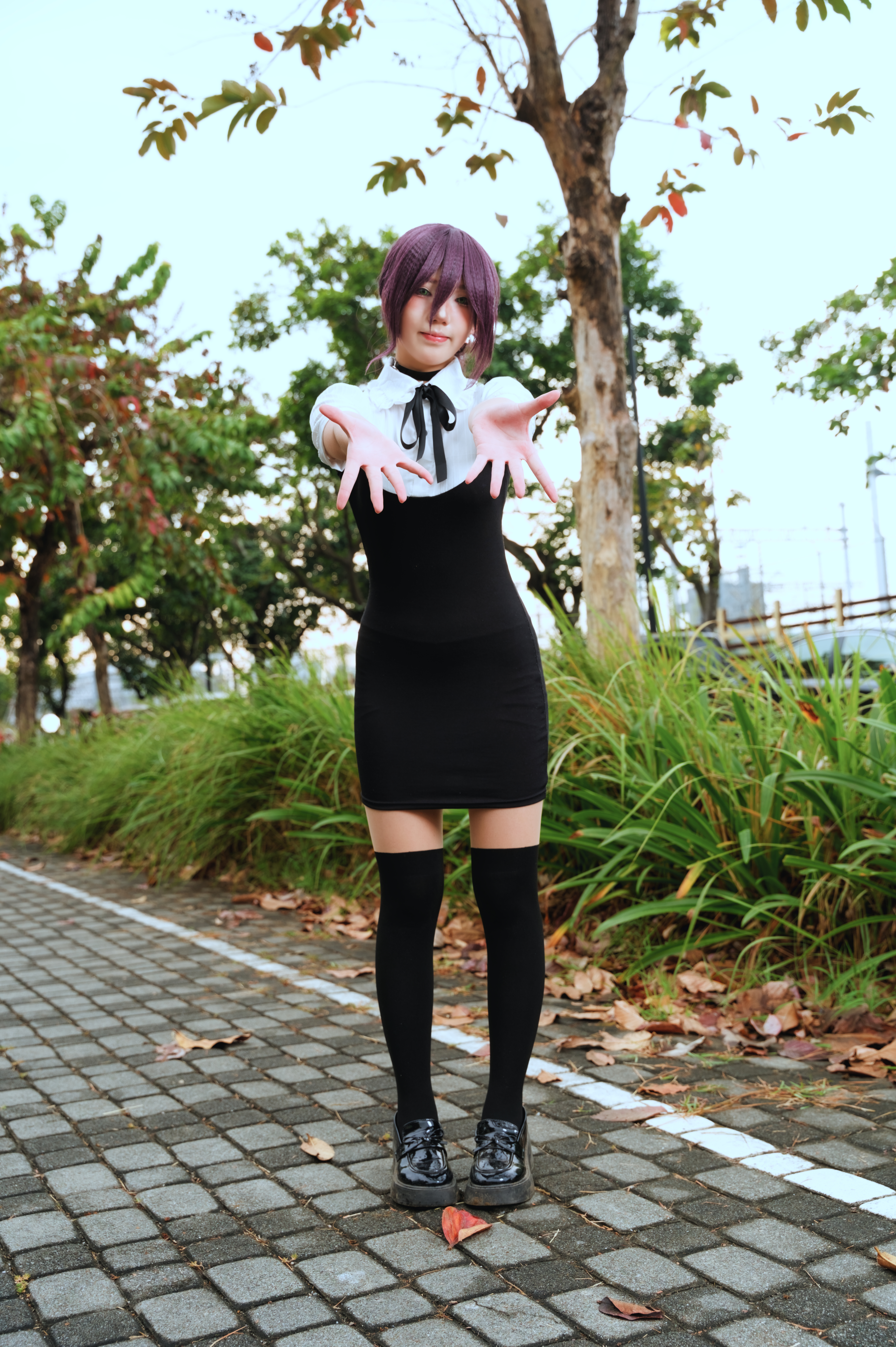
Cosplay of Reze

A reviewer for Anime News Network considered the relationship between Reze and Denji to be far healthier than that between Denji and Makima, noting that while Reze had ulterior motives, she genuinely wanted Denji to become a better person. IGN opined that Reze perfectly embodies Denji's first love. Polygon stated that Reze and Denji are a perfect match, praising Reze as a captivating femme fatale, and remarking that despite understanding deep down that a happy ending was never meant to be, one still wishes the two could have ended up together. Comic Book Resources rated Reze as the best antagonist and greatest female character in Chainsaw Man, describing her as a deadly, beautiful, mysterious, and unforgettable "bad girl." The Fandom Post commented that Reze is portrayed as Denji's "manic pixie dream girl," suggesting that she seemed almost too perfect to be real and was even less likely to fall for a complete loser like Denji, adding that Reze demonstrated more sophisticated manipulation skills than Makima. Brett Cardaro described Reze's strength and said that she "Has Officially Become Chainsaw Man's Most Explosive Villain Yet", and he pointed out that despite losing to Denji in their final duel, she is "easily the stronger and more skilled fighter between them".

Vamsi Krishna of FandomWire saw Reze as a complex character, and said that "She was supposed to assassinate him for her mission, but she found herself feeling something for him. Her mission, training, and feelings contradict each other, making her so complex that not even she was able to understand herself until she died".

In the first popularity poll of the manga, Reze ranked fourth with 19,079 votes; in the second poll, she placed fifth with 45,741 votes; and in the third poll, she took first place with 205,775 votes. In the 2025 Internet Buzzword Awards Top 100, Reze ranked 16th in the "Top 20 Single Words" category. The special "Reze Dance" video uploaded by Kenshi Yonezu on social media also sparked an online sensation, becoming the second most-liked post in Japanese history.

However, one of Reze's criticisms of her character is that not a single dialogue or explanation for Reze's fate in the aftermath of Part 1 when all the other Hybrids returned at various points in Part 2, singling out Reze as the only one who's fate is never disclosed or resolved.

At the 20th Seiyu Awards, Reina Ueda won the Best Supporting Actress Award for her portrayal of the character. At the 10th Crunchyroll Anime Awards, seven of Reze's international voice actors were nominated for the "Best Voice Artist Performance" category, namely Reina Ueda (Japanese), Alexis Tipton (English), Cristina Peña (Castilian), Clara Soares (French), Laurine Betz (German), Heena Malik (Hindi), and Jessica Ángeles (Spanish); however, they lost to Aoi Yūki's Maomao, Lucien Dodge and Carles Teruel's Akaza, Bastien Bourlé's Izuku Midoriya, Gerrit Schmidt-Foß's Akaza, Abishek Sharma's Jinshi, and José Antonio Toledano's Akaza. In an interview, Ryan Colt Levy, Denji's English voice actor, preferred Reze over Makima.
