= Anne Shirley (2025 TV series) =

Japanese anime television series

- Promotional poster
- アン・シャーリー
- Based on: Anne of Green Gables by Lucy Maud Montgomery
- Developed by: Natsuko Takahashi
- Directed by: Hiroshi Kawamata
- Music by: Michiru Ōshima
- Countries of origin: Canada; Japan
- Original language: Japanese
- No. of episodes: 24

Production
- Producers: Yoshiko Nakayama; Mami Nakatani; Yukari Kiso; Sayaka Kanno
- Animator: The Answer Studio
- Production company: "Anne Shirley" Production Committee (Note: Label consisting of various companies.)

Original release
- Network: NHK Educational TV
- Release: April 5 – September 27, 2025

Related
- Anne of Green Gables (1979)
- Manga
- Illustrated by: Akane Hoshikubo
- Published by: Enterbrain
- Imprint: B's Log Comics
- Magazine: B's Log Comic
- Original run: January 5, 2025 – present
- Volumes: 1

Anne Shirley (Japanese: アン・シャーリー, Hepburn: An Shārī) is a Japanese anime television series produced by The Answer Studio and directed by Hiroshi Kawamata. It is based on the first three Anne of Green Gables novels by Lucy Maud Montgomery, specifically the 1952 translation by Hanako Muraoka. The series aired from April to September 2025.

A manga adaptation illustrated by Akane Hoshikubo began serialization in Enterbrain's B's Log Comic online magazine in January 2025.

== Plot ==
An eleven-year-old girl, Anne Shirley, leaves the orphanage and is adopted by a family on Prince Edward Island. She was sent to live with Matthew and Marilla Cuthbert, despite them asking for a boy. Matthew, Marilla's older brother, welcomes her, but Marilla is initially cold, wanting her to be returned. As time goes on, she warms up to Anne, deciding to let her stay with her and Matthew at their home, known as Green Gables. During her life there, she goes through personal and life challenges, and makes life-long friends, such as Diana Barry, and competitors like Gilbert Blythe. In the process of the series, she grows up, and matures as a woman, experiencing love, happiness, friendship, sadness, and loss.

== Characters ==
Anne Shirley (アン・シャーリー, An Shārī)
Voiced by: Honoka Inoue (Japanese); Monica Flatley (English)
An 11-year-old girl who comes from an orphanage. She has a vivid imagination and becomes used to her life in Green Gables, on Prince Edward Island. She can have a temper, especially when people make fun of her looks, including her red hair. As the series progresses, she becomes more mature and confident, eventually becoming a professional teacher and going to college to further her education.
Marilla Cuthbert (マリラ・カスバート, Marira Kasubāto)
Voiced by: Aya Nakamura (Japanese); Linda Leonard (English)
The adopted mother of Anne, who is unsure about Anne at first, after she and Matthew were supposed to have a boy from the orphanage, rather than a girl, but warms up to her. She can be stern and strict with Anne, attempting to instill discipline in her, but also forgiving, as she grows to love Anne's vivacity and joy. Despite her strict and conservative upbringing, Marilla has fairly progressive views for her time and serves as one of the two main motivators for Anne getting an education and choosing a profession instead of becoming a housewife.
Matthew Cuthbert (マシュウ・カスバート, Mashū Kasubāto)
Voiced by: Yasunori Matsumoto (Japanese); Randy Pearlman (English)
The adopted father of Anne, who quickly takes a liking to her, and tries to temper Marilla's reactions to the eleven-year-old unique and quirky Anne. He is the older brother of Marilla and has no qualms about "spoiling" Anne and indulging her with pretty clothes and fancy shoes. He dies of a heart attack from the shock of learning the bank closed down in Episode 10. As she grows into a pretty and more confident teenager, Anne still visits his grave whenever she is feeling down, thinking of what he would say.
Diana Barry (ダイアナ・バーリー, Daiana Bārī)
Voiced by: Yume Miyamoto (Japanese); Amanda Gael (English)
The bosom friend of Anne, who she meets early on during her time in Green Gables. She is one of the only girls who is Anne's age who is living in the local area. While she does not have a vivid imagination like Anne, she remains a loyal bosom friend. Their friendship is so strong and passionate that as children they were practically inseparable and constantly professed their love for each other. They remain best friends into adulthood, always hanging out closely when Anne comes home from college for the holidays. She later meets one of the guys in their youth city development society and after a few years, she accepts his proposal of engagement. This somewhat upsets Anne, who feels like she is the only one who has not yet decided on her life path.
Gilbert Blythe (ギルバート・ブライス, Girubāto Buraisu)
Voiced by: Naoya Miyase (Japanese); Corey Wilder (English)
A thirteen-year-old boy who teases girls at the local school and makes fun of Anne's hair, calling it "carrots," resulting in her breaking a slate over his head, causing him to fall in love with her. Due to making fun of her, and ignoring his attempts to apologize to her, she refuses to speak with him for several years. Gradually, they make peace and even become quite close friends after Gilbert helps her get further education. Despite this, there is still some awkwardness in their relationship, as Anne still does not understand how she feels about him and does not know how to respond to his courtship.
Teddy Phillips (テディ・フィリップス, Tedi Firippusu)
Voiced by: Teruyuki Tanzawa (Japanese); Ian Sinclair (English)
A strict and unpopular teacher at Avonlea, who often misspells Anne's name, by not including the "E" and punishes her, but not others, for arriving late, resulting in Anne's refusal to attend school for several weeks. Once, he punished Anne for losing her temper with Gilbert Blythe. He is described as lacking discipline, and "courts" one of his older pupils, Prissy Andrews, openly.
Rachel Lynde (レイチェル・リンド, Reicheru Rindo)
Voiced by: Kimiko Saitō (Japanese); Casey Casper (English)
Living near Matthew and Marilla, Mrs. Lynde is a noted busybody but is also industrious and charitable. Although she and Anne start off on the wrong foot due to Mrs. Lynde's blunt criticism and Anne's short temper, they soon become quite close.
Ruby Gillis (ルビー・ギリス, Rubī Girisu)
Voiced by: Sora Amamiya (Japanese); Hayden Daviau (English)
Another of Anne's friends. Having several "grown-up" sisters, Ruby loves to share her knowledge of beaux with her friends. She is pretty and blonde, but rather empty-headed and prone to hysterics. In Episode 19, she dies young from an unspecified incurable disease (implied to be tuberculosis), having received relief shortly before her death from Anne's motivational words and time spent with her.
Jane Andrews (ジェーン・アンドリュース, Jēn Andoryūzu)
Voiced by: Sayaka Kikuchi (Japanese); Rebecca Danae (English)
One of Anne's friends from school, she is plain and sensible.
Lewis Andrews
Voiced by: Dakota Farnsworth
J.A. Harrison (J.A.ハリソン, J.A. Harrison)
Voiced by: Hikari Ōta
An older man who is eccentric, resulting in people near him not understanding him, and he has a harsh-speaking parrot named Ginger.
Eliza Barry (エリザ・バーリー, Eriza Bārī)
Voiced by: Rena Maeda
The strict mother of Diana.
Mary Bell (メアリー・ベル, Mearī Beru)
Voiced by: Saya Hitomi
Josie Pye (ジョシー・パイ, Joshī Pai)
Voiced by: Aki Sasamori
A classmate generally disliked by the other girls (as are her siblings), Josie is vain, dishonest, sharp-tongued, and jealous of Anne's popularity.
Jimmy Glover (ジミー・グロヴァ, Jimī Gurova)
Voiced by: Shoya Ishige
A male friend of Gilbert.
Charlie Sloane (チャーリー・スローン, Chārī Surōn)
Voiced by: Chiharu Sawashiro
A male friend of Gilbert, who hangs out with him and Jimmy.
Carrie Sloane (キャリー・スローン, Kyarī Surōn)
Voiced by: Saima Nakano
The sister of Charlie.
Mrs. Heather Hammond
Voiced by: TBA
Anne lives with her for a portion of her pre-Green-Gables life and cares for Mrs. Hammond's three sets of twins. Anne is sent to the Hopetown orphan asylum when Mrs. Hammond is forced to break up her home after her husband's sudden death.
Minnie Mae MacPherson (ミニー・メイ・マクファーソン, Minī Mei Makufāson)
Voiced by: Chinami Nishikawa
Moody Spurgeon MacPherson (ムーディー・スパージョン・マクファーソン, Mūdī Supājon Makufāson)
Voiced by: Takaaki Torashima (Japanese); Ciarán Strange (English)
Ella May MacPherson
Voiced by: Azusa Tachibana (Japanese); Leo Matthews (English)
Mrs. Blewett
Voiced by: Seiko Tamura (Japanese); Wendy Powell (English)
Mrs. Spencer
Voiced by: Chie Nakamura (Japanese); Anastasia Muñoz (English)
Flora Jane
Voiced by: Sayaka Senbongi (Japanese); Laura Faverty (English)
Muriel Stacy
Voiced by: Fumiko Orikasa (Japanese); Molly Searcy (English)
Teddy Phillips' replacement as teacher at the Avonlea School.
Philippa Gordon
Voiced by: Chika Anzai (Japanese); KyLeigh Zimmerer (English)
Also known as "Phil" for short.
Mrs. Allan
Voiced by: Madeleine Norton
Mary Joe
Voiced by: Monica Piskor
Royal "Roy" Gardner
Voiced by: Tokuyoshi Kawashima
Paul Irving
David "Davy" Keith
A young boy who is Marilla's third cousin whom she takes in, along with his well-behaved twin sister, when his mother passed away.
Dora Keith
A young girl, Davy's twin sister, who is also a third cousin of Marilla's.
Lavender Lewis
A middle-aged woman with white hair who has had feelings for Stephen Irving since their youth. An argument had broken them apart, which she regretted. She meets the motherless young son of her old sweetheart, and takes a liking to him as he reminds her of his father. Some weeks later, she finally meets Stephen again for the first time in decades. He proposes to her again and she happily accepts.
Lenora/Charlotta the Fourth
Stephen Irving
Paul Irving's father who finally marries his teenage sweetheart Lavender Lewis.

== Media ==
=== Manga ===
A manga adaptation by Akane Hoshikubo, also based on the 1952 translation by Hanako Muraoka, began serialization in Enterbrain's B's Log Comic online magazine on January 5, 2025.

No.	Release date	ISBN
1	August 1, 2025	978-4-04-738531-3

=== Anime ===
The new anime television series adaptation of Lucy Maud Montgomery's Anne of Green Gables novels was announced in November 2024. It was produced by The Answer Studio and directed by Hiroshi Kawamata, with character designs handled by Kenichi Tsuchiya and music composed by Michiru Ōshima. The series aired for 24 episodes from April 5 to September 27, 2025, on NHK Educational TV. From episode three onwards, the opening theme song is "Yokan" (予感; lit. 'Premonition') performed by Tota, while the ending theme song is "Heart", performed by Laura Day Romance. Crunchyroll streamed the series. Medialink licensed the series in Southeast Asia for streaming on Ani-One Asia's YouTube channel.

==== Episodes ====
The series is divided into three arcs, each one corresponding to a novel in the series: Anne of Green Gables, Anne of Avonlea and Anne of the Island.

No.	Title	Directed by (Note: Production staff information is taken from the ending credits of each episode)	Written by	Storyboarded by	Original release date
Green Gables Arc
1	"It's Such an Interesting World"; Transliteration: "Sekai tte, Totemo Omoshiroi Tokone" (Japanese: 世界って、とてもおもしろいとこね)	Hiroshi Kawamata	Natsuko Takahashi	Hiroshi Kawamata	April 5, 2025
Anne Shirley, eleven-year-old girl born in Nova Scotia, arrives at Prince Edward Island from an orphanage, where she will be living with the Cuthberts, with Mrs. Spencer bidding her adieu. She happily greets Matthew Cuthbert at the train station. Marilla reveals to Rachel Lynde that she is getting a "little orphan boy" to raise. On their ride together to Green Gables, Anne quickly charms him with her active imagination, giving nicknames to places they pass, as she shares her insecurities. When she gets inside Green Gables, Marilla asks where "the boy" is, Matthew begins to explain what happened, and Anne feels unwanted. She admits her real name following further questions, saying it is fine as long as they spell it as "Anne" rather than "Ann." Later, she refuses to eat her dinner and goes to sleep while sobbing. The next morning, Anne accepts the day but decides to not go outside because it will be her last time there. They travel to the house of Mrs. Spencer to return Anne, and she reluctantly talks about herself. They make it to the house, and after Anne looks terrified of Mrs. Blewett, causing Marilla to save Anne and take her back to Green Gables. Marilla later tells Matthew she isn't sure about raising Anne, and Anne prays for a better future.
2	"I Love Pretty Things"; Transliteration: "Atashi, Kireina Mono ga Suki" (Japanese: あたし、きれいなものが好き)	Higashio Yamauchi	Natsuko Takahashi	Hiroshi Kawamata	April 12, 2025
Anne begins her day by doing farm work, then eating breakfast with Marilla and Matthew. She asks if she is going to be sent away or not, and Marilla announces she will be kept as long as she is a "good little girl." She asks Anne to call her "Marilla" rather than any other name. Rachel warns Marilla about keeping Anne, but Marilla says her decision is final. After Rachel insults her appearance, including her hair, Anne is infuriated, saying she hates Rachel, then insults her, and says she will never forgive her. Following this, Marilla tells Rachel that she shouldn't have insulted Anne. Later, Anne refuses to apologize despite Marilla's pleading. The next day, Matthew suggests to her that she should apologize, and she agrees, putting on a show-and-dance for Rachel. On the way back, Anne and Marilla talk to each other. The day after, Anne travels to Sunday school and wears a flower crown, which Marilla chastises her for. Anne apologizes and says she should be sent back to the asylum, with Marilla rejecting this idea. Anne meets Diana Barry, and both become fast friends, making a pact to be faithful bosom friends until the end of time. Following this, Anne tells Marilla how wonderful Diana is. Matthew gives Anne sweets as a gift.
3	"Looking Forward to Things Is Half the Pleasure of Them"; Transliteration: "Nani ka o Tanoshimi ni Shite Matsu to iu Koto ga, Sono Ureshī Koto no Hanbun Niataru no yo" (Japanese: 何かを楽しみにして待つということが、その嬉しいことの半分に当たるのよ)	Masaki Sugiyama	Hirami Do	Junichi Togawa	April 19, 2025
The painting Diana made is hung in Anne's room. Anne tells Marilla she has been invited to the Sunday school picnic, and Marilla accepts it. When Marilla tells Anne about her missing brooch, Anne admits she wore it once, then returned it. After Marilla searches again, she commands Anne to stay in her room until she "tells the truth." She talks to Matthew about it. The next morning, Marilla tells Anne she will not be allowed to go to the picnic unless she confesses. The morning after, Anne tells Marilla she took the brooch, but Marilla refuses to let her go. Some time later, Marilla finds the brooch in her room. Anne admits she gave a false confession, which she had rehearsed the night before. Anne travels to the picnic and meets other girls in the nearby area around her age. The next day, Anne goes to Avonlea school for the first time. Anne shows the class her geography knowledge and reads from a poem. She shares her lunch with Diana and other neighborhood girls. Gilbert Blythe, a 14-year-old boy, begins attending school the next day. When he makes fun of Anne's hair, she breaks her school slate over his head. He attempts to take responsibility, but Mr. Philips punishes her. Gilbert attempts to apologize, but she refuses his apology. She returns before the bell rings, but Mr. Phillips puts her among the boys as punishment. She runs off and vows to never return to school again.
4	"One Can't Stay Sad Very Long in Such an Interesting World"; Transliteration: "Kon'na Omoshiroi Sekai de, Itsu Made mo Kanashinjai Rarenai Wa" (Japanese: こんなおもしろい世界で、いつまでも悲しんじゃいられないわ)	Hiromichi Matano	Rinrin	Yoshiaki Okumura	April 26, 2025
Rachel advises Marilla to let Anne not go to school for a week. Diana comes over for a tea party, and Anne pours what she thinks is raspberry cordial, but it is actually currant wine. This causes Diana's mother to say that Anne can no longer speak or hang out with Diana. Both girls make a promise to never forget one another, then part, but not before Anne kisses Diana on the forehead and gets a lock of her hair. The next day, Anna decides to go to school and tries to act like a model student. She gets gifts from the other students at school. The following day, Diana and Anne exchange letters, while Anne refuses to talk to Gilbert, with both getting high marks in class. It is shown that Anne secretly exchanges letters with Diana, while Anne laments she can't talk with Diana. That winter, Anne helps treat Diana's sister, Minnie May, who gets sick with croup, with ipecac, and Matthew gets a doctor from a nearby town. Matthew and Anne travel home. Later, Diana and Anne are again on speaking terms after Diana's mother is grateful for what Anne did for Minnie. Anne gushes to Matthew and Marilla about the time she had with Diana. She reads the letter Diana gave her and falls asleep.
5	"Let Us Look on the Bright Side of Things"; Transliteration: "Mono Goto no Akarui Hō o Kangaemashō" (Japanese: ものごとの明るいほうを考えましょう)	Shigeki Awai	Natsuko Takahashi	Hideaki Uehara	May 3, 2025
Anne recalls that Mr. Phillips is leaving and that Ruby said goodbye to him while she cried. She notes they met the minister and his wife afterward, expressing her admiration of the woman's clothing, including puffed sleeves. Later, Anne and the other girls play a game where they dare each other to do things, with Diana walking on one foot and Josie walking on top of a fence. Despite the pleas from Diana, Anne climbs a ladder onto the roof so she can walk the ridgepole, saying her honor is at stake, and ends up falling, injuring her ankle in the process. She is on bed rest for six weeks, during which she is visited by people on the island. Diana brings The Rosebud Garden by Charlotte E. Morgan. After she has fully recovered, Anne returns to school and meets the new teacher, Ms. Stacy. At lunchtime, she eats with some of the girls. Anne receives a dress with puffed sleeves for her recitation at the Christmas concert, "Recollections," and gets over her stage fright when seeing Marilla and Matthew there. Anne gives Diana confidence before she sings The Island Hymn. Afterward, Anne and Diana praise one another, and it's revealed that Gilbert picked up a rose that had been in Anne's hair. Matthew and Marilla agree that Anne should go to Queen's Academy.
6	"I Thought Nothing Could Be As Bad As Red Hair"; Transliteration: "Akage Kurai, Iyana Mono wa Nai to Omotteitano" (Japanese: 赤毛くらい、いやなものはないと思っていたの)	Shinji Sano	Hirami Do	Yo Miura	May 10, 2025
Anne learns that neither Matthew nor Marilla is married, and she struggles with a storytelling proposal. Diana worries about it, and they see a mink on the way to school. Later, Anne shares her story idea with Diana, adding that red hair would not be what the heroine of her story would have, saying they would have golden or black hair instead. Anne asks Ruby about how her sisters got proposed to for ideas in her story. Late that night, Anne continues writing her story. The next day, she shares more details of the story with Anne, and other girls hear it, are enthralled, and a story club begins. The following day, Diana reads her story in front of the class. Ms. Stacy says Anne has a knack for leadership. That night, Marilla laughs at some of Anne's stories she has written. Some time after, Marilla finds Anne in her room, uncovers that she partially dyed her hair, and Marilla tries to wash it out. Diana tells Anne to not despair about her hair, and she later asks Marilla to cut it off. She goes to class the following day with short hair, surprising her classmates.
7	"I've Been Making Mistakes, but Each Mistake Has Helped to Cure Me of My Shortcomings"; Transliteration: "Shippai Bakari Shite Kitake do, Hitotsu Suru Tabi ni Jibun no Warui Bubun ga Naotteiku no" (Japanese: 失敗ばかりしてきたけど、一つするたびに自分の悪い部分が直っていくの)	Masaki Sugiyama	Rinrin	Hiroshi Kawamata	May 17, 2025
Anne is saved by Gilbert after a game goes badly, but she refuses to accept his offer of friendship after he attempts to apologize, remaining stubborn. However, she regrets not forgiving him. Later on, Jane declares she'll never marry anyone, and Matthew collapses from a bad spell, causing Marilla and Anne to be worried.
8	"I Don't Want to Be Anyone but Myself"; Transliteration: "Atashi wa, Jibun no Hoka, Dare ni mo Naritakunai wa" (Japanese: あたしは、自分の他、誰にもなりたくないわ)	Masahiro Hosoda	Natsuko Takahashi	Minoru Ohara	May 24, 2025
Anne ties the top place for Queen's Academy exams with Gilbert, but only she is asked to do a recitation of a poem. Her performance follows a professional named Mrs. Evans, who recites "The Flower that Smiles To-Day." Anne follows by reading from "The Maiden's Vow" by Carolina Oliphant, and as an encore, recites the poem by Hilaire Belloc, "The Frog," in a Victorian music hall. In the process, Gilbert is pleased, as are Anne's parents, and the audience as a whole, at how the performance goes. All the while, Anne thinks about what she will do in Queen's Academy, as her goals begin to shift.
9	"Next to Trying and Winning, the Best Thing Is Trying and Failing"; Transliteration: "Isshōkenmei ni Yatte Katsu Koto no Tsugi ni īno wa, Isshōkenmei Yatte Makeru Kotona no yo" (Japanese: 一生懸命にやって勝つことの次にいいのは、一生懸命やって負けることなのよ)	Shinji Sano	Rinrin	Hiroshi Kawamata	May 31, 2025
Anne goes to school at Queen's Academy, while Marilla and Matthew miss her, beginning her work to get a teacher's license. Ruby and Jane are at the same school, encouraging her to become friends with Gilbert. Anne writes to Diana about her time in the academy, noting she is very lonely, but is grateful to have a familiar face, like that of Gilbert, in her class. She admits she is homesick and cries while writing her letter to Diana. Anne talks to two other girls in her class: Stella and Priscilla. Anne goes back to Green Gables for Christmas and meets Diana. Later, in the spring, Diana reads a letter from Anne. Some time after, Anne learns that she won the Avery scholarship for Redmond College, while Gilbert is a gold medalist. Anne graduates and returns to Green Gables with Marilla and Matthew. Anne learns that Gilbert will be teaching and not attending Redmond, while Marilla and Matthew are having more health problems. Anne and Diana spend the day together. Matthew and Anne have a heart-to-heart talk.
10	"I Don't Know What Lies Around the Bend, but I'm Going to Believe That the Best Does"; Transliteration: "Magarikado o Magatta Saki ni Nani ga Aru ka wa, Wakaranai Demo, Kitto Ichiban Yoi Mono ni Chigainai no" (Japanese: 曲がり角をまがった先に何があるかは、わからないでも、きっと一番良いものに違いないの)	Shinji Sano	Natsuko Takahashi	Junichi Togawa	June 7, 2025
After Anne returns from Queens, Matthew suddenly falls to the ground after reading the paper. It is later revealed he had a sudden heart attack and died. Anne collects flowers solemnly and there is a funeral series. Diana remains supportive of Anne, while Marilla and Anne embrace one another, with Marilla glad Anne is there. Later, Matthew's casket leaves Green Gables in a funeral procession. Some time after, Anne begins to enjoy life again, while planting scotch roses near Matthew's grave, and placing honeysuckle buds in Marilla's hair. She reveals that she will not attend Redmond College and will be staying in Green Gables to care for Marilla, teach at Avonlea, and take courses at Carmody, to her shock. She ultimately accepts this. After Anne learns of what Gilbert did for her, she is grateful, forgives him for making fun of her hair, and they promise to be the best of friends. Marilla later teases Anne about how much time she is spending talking with Gilbert and she blushes.
Avonlea Teacher Arc
11	"I'd Like to Add Some Beauty to Life"; Transliteration: "Atashi wa Jinsei o Utsukushī Mono ni Shitai no" (Japanese: あたしは人生を美しいものにしたいの)	Shigeki Awai	Hirami Do	Minoru Ohara	June 14, 2025
12	"Perhaps We Always Love Best the People Who Need Us"; Transliteration: "Atashitachi wa Jibun o Hitsuyō to Shitekureru Hito o Suki ni Narun Janaika Shira" (Japanese: あたしたちは自分を必要としてくれる人を好きになるんじゃないかしら)	Masaki Sugiyama	Rinrin	Shinichi Watanabe	June 21, 2025
13	"When I Think Something Nice Is Going to Happen, I Seem to Fly Right Up On the Wings of Anticipation"; Transliteration: "Subarashī Koto ga Okoru to Omōto, Atashi Sōzō no Tsubasa ni Notte Tobiagaru no" (Japanese: 素晴らしいことが起こると思うと、あたし想像の翼に乗って飛び上がるの)	Akira Kato	Rinrin	Shinichi Watanabe	June 28, 2025
14	"It Is Never Too Late for the Real Prince to Come for the True Princess"; Transliteration: "Honmono no Ōji Sama ga, Honmono no Ohime-sama ni Ai ni Kurunoni, Ososugiru Koto wa Arimasenwa" (Japanese: 本物の王子様が、本物のお姫様に会いに来るのに、遅すぎることはありませんわ)	Masaki Sugiyama	Hirami Do	Shin Nakajima	July 5, 2025
15	"I'll Come From the Ends of the Earth If Necessary"; Transliteration: "Sekai no Hate ni Ite mo, Tondeikuwa" (Japanese: 世界の果てにいても、飛んでいくわ)	Takaaki Azuma, Taichi Atarashi	Natsuko Takahashi	Ohara Minoru	July 12, 2025
Redmond College Arc
16	"It's Nicer Not to Know"; Transliteration: "Shiritai to Mo omowanai Wakaranai Kata ga Sutekidakara" (Japanese: 知りたいとも思わない 分からない方が素敵だから)	Shinji Sano	Rinrin	Yo Miura	July 19, 2025
17	"Love is the Power That Transforms Everything"; Transliteration: "Subete o Ippen Sa seru Gendōryoku Soreha Aijōna no" (Japanese: すべてを一変させる原動力 それは愛情なの)	Takaaki Azuma, Taichi Atarashi	Natsuko Takahashi	Ohara Minoru	July 26, 2025
18	"I Feel as if I Had Opened a Book and Found Roses of Yesterday, Sweet and Beloved, Between Its Leaves"; Transliteration: "Hon o Aitara Kinō no Bara Ga Utsukushiku Yomigaette Kita Yōna Kimochi" (Japanese: 本を開いたら昨日のバラが美しくよみがえってきたような気持ち)	Yūki Nishiyama	Rinrin	Junichi Togawa	August 2, 2025
19	"I'll Walk the Path to Heaven from Here and Now"; Transliteration: "Tengoku e Tsudzuku Michi o Ima, Koko Kara Aruite Yuku Wa" (Japanese: 天国へ続く道を今、ここから歩いてゆくわ)	Masaki Sugiyama	Hirami Do	Ohara Minoru	August 23, 2025
20	"My World Has Fallen Apart"; Transliteration: "Atashi No Sekai wa Barabara ni Kuzurete Shimatta No" (Japanese: あたしの世界はバラバラに崩れてしまったの)	Akira Kato	Natsuko Takahashi	Kaori	August 30, 2025
21	"Has the Real Prince Come at Last...?"; Transliteration: "Tsuini Hontō no Ōji-sama ga Arawareta no Kashira..." (Japanese: ついに本当の王子様が現れたのかしら...)	Akari Minagawa	Rinrin	Akari Minagawa	September 6, 2025
22	"How Horrible It Is That People Have to Grow Up, Marry, and Change!"; Transliteration: "Otona ni Natte Kekkon Shite, Kawatte Ikutte, Nante Tsurai Kotona no?" (Japanese: 大人になって結婚して、変わっていくって、なんてつらいことなの!?)	Yasuo Ejima	Hirami Do	Junichi Togawa	September 13, 2025
23	"I Have Learned to Look upon Each Little Hindrance as a Jest and Each Great One as the Foreshadowing of Victory"; Transliteration: "Chiisana Kabe o Jōdan to Minashi, Ōkina Kabe o Shōri no Yohō to se-yo" (Japanese: 小さな壁を冗談とみなし、大きな壁を勝利の予報とせよ)	Masaki Sugiyama	Rinrin	Ohara Minoru	September 20, 2025
24	"It's the Birthday of Our Happiness"; Transliteration: "Kyō wa Atarachi no Kōfuku no Tanjōbi yo" (Japanese: 今日はあたしたちの幸福の誕生日よ)	Masaki Sugiyama, Shinji Sano	Natsuko Takahashi	Kaori	September 27, 2025

== Reception ==
The series was well received. Anime Feminist said that the series had "feminist potential" and called it "gorgeous new take" on the Anne of Green Gables series, while honoring previous adaptations and welcoming those unfamiliar with the story, while being "concerned with the autonomy of children" and celebrating the "odd little girl protagonist," Anne Shirley. A review on the same site by Vrai Kaiser noted that Anne of Green Gables very popular and integrated into Japan, even incorporated into school curricula, spawning a TV anime in 1979, and said that you could see "traces of Anne in the evolution of shoujo and yuri" and noted that some described Anne's friendship with Diana Barry as fitting into "the tradition of Class-S that had been paved some decades earlier by Yoshiya Nobuko." Kaiser also described the series premiere as "beautiful, lovingly made", noted that it was "inevitably indebted" to the previous anime adaptation, praised series composer Takahashi Natsuko and the storytelling, said that Marilla may have less time to shine due to the shorter run-time of the entire series, calling her a "fascinating character" and hoped viewers gave the series "a chance," and described it as a series about a character who found "joy in a society that's been built to devalue and steal from young girls."

Prior to the series premiere, Rebecca Silverman of Anime News Network said that while there was "a special place" in her heart for the original anime version as well and she was not "incredibly excited about this new adaptation," and said that many "modern heroines owe their roots to her Anne," that the series teasers and trailers take "a lot of inspiration from the original 1977 designs of Yoshifumi Kondō, complete with imagery with a "charmingly old-fashioned, pastoral feel." She concluded by saying that if the series can "pull off even half the charm of its source material, it should be something really special."

Following the series premiere, Silverman reviewed the anime's first two episodes, noting that we have to consider "what's being cut" in this adaptation, noting that chapters about "Anne attending church...are abbreviated" while praising the characters in the series and the voice acting of Honoka Inoue, argued that "the moments chosen to animate are perfect", and said that the series is "capturing the beauty of Montgomery's text." In her review of the third episode, Silverman described the episode as "beautiful exploration of the various sides of Anne," complete with the iconic breaking of a slate over Gilbert's head by Anne, stated that most of what is being excluded is "the religious bits", and called it fitting that Anne recites part of a verse drama by Robert Browning entitled Pippa Passes in this episode.

Petrana Radulovic of Polygon praised the anime's interpretation of Anne responding to Gilbert's taunts by smashing "the slate on Gilbert's head...like it's some super-intense anime showdown," asserted that the "only proper way" to adapt the big feelings of the novel is through "an anime adaptation," and said the latter makes sense considering how many elements of the series are present in anime, like "the episodic nature of the chapters" and the close and "almost romantic friendship between Diana and Anne." She also stated that this series "fully uses the medium of animation" to bolster elements of the original work. Jade King of TheGamer said the series is soft, endearing, and gives off "comforting cottagecore vibes" and "sickeningly sweet energy," calling it the "cutest anime" of Spring 2025, expressing her admiration for how the series depicts Anne as a "spunky, imaginative, undeniably hopeful young girl who...takes everything in stride" and stated it reminded her of Studio Ghibli films like Only Yesterday, When Marnie Was There, and Kiki's Delivery Service, and games such as Stardew Valley, Coral Island, and Fields of Mistria. Vera Vargas of CBR praised the ninth episode of the series, calling it "entertaining," with themes that are timeless, "flawless characterization and relatable interactions" and asserted that the series "keeps many moments" from the original novel.

At the 10th Crunchyroll Anime Awards in 2026, Anne Shirley was nominated for Best Drama and Best Slice of Life categories.
