= Denji (Chainsaw Man) =

Fictional character from Chainsaw Man

- Chainsaw Man character
- Denji's human form as illustrated by Tatsuki Fujimoto
- First appearance: Chainsaw Man chapter 1: Dog & Chainsaw (December 3, 2018)
- Last appearance: Chainsaw Man chapter 232: Thank You, Chainsaw Man (March 25, 2026)
- Created by: Tatsuki Fujimoto
- Voiced by: Japanese: Kikunosuke Toya; Marina Inoue (child); English: Ryan Colt Levy; Ciarán Strange (child)

In-universe information
- Species: Devil-human hybrid

Denji (Japanese: デンジ) is the main protagonist of the manga series Chainsaw Man by Tatsuki Fujimoto. He is a human teenager with the ability to transform into the Devil-human hybrid known as Chainsaw Man (チェンソーマン, Chensō Man) by pulling a cord on his chest, thanks to a near-death experience in which his companion, the dog-like Chainsaw Devil Pochita, fused with him and became his heart. As a Public Safety Devil Hunter, Denji's hired by Tokyo Special Division 4 leader Makima to fight alongside its members in their battle to kill the Gun Devil, all the while pursuing his own personal interests.

Denji is the main protagonist of the series' first part, the Public Safety arc, and one of the two protagonists (with Asa Mitaka) of its second part. The character was largely praised by critics, many taking note of how his character's simple goals contrasted with other shōnen protagonists' lofty ideals. His backstory and the relationships Denji forms with other characters, particularly Pochita and Power, had a positive reception. Denji is voiced by Kikunosuke Toya in Japanese and Ryan Colt Levy in English.

== Creation ==
Designs by Tatsuki Fujimoto of Denji's human form, including rejected designs

Compared to his work on Fire Punch, Tatsuki Fujimoto wrote Denji to be a more emotional character than Agni, the main protagonist of the former work. Fujimoto felt it best to write Denji with part of his own personality, and in turn wrote Denji to have masochistic tendencies. When Fujimoto first created Chainsaw Man, he had the idea of a protagonist who, whenever he pulled a cord, could sprout a chainsaw from his head; Fujimoto then shaped the narrative and Denji's character from there. Fujimoto's editor was hesitant to make Denji the protagonist, believing a hero who fought with chainsaws could easily be mistaken for a villain; however, he and Fujimoto worked around this initial misunderstanding. Denji and Pochita's relational dynamic was inspired by Finn the Human and Jake the Dog from Adventure Time as Fujimoto was a fan of them. The final fight between Denji and Makima was based on the novel Kizumonogatari between Koyomi Araragi and Kiss-shot Acerola-orion Heart-under-blade.

Writer Hiroshi Seko found the series' charm to be how Denji is only interested in having meals and dating women which contrasts other series he saw. Manabu Otsuka enjoyed the focus of Denji, Aki and Power because Fujimoto highlights how the characters form bonds while living together. In adapting the manga, the team made sure the body language of Denji and Makima was properly executed.

Yuji Kaku, author of Hell's Paradise: Jigokuraku and a former assistant of Fujimoto's, noted the similarity between Denji's character and Fujimoto himself stating that his crass way of speaking is "completely that" of Fujimoto: "there are times when Fujimoto-sensei will speak exactly the same as Denji." Kaku felt that the way chainsaws are "just stuck onto [Denji]" was done on purpose, so it did not feel natural. Kaku also took note of Denji's design as Chainsaw Man and how Fujimoto focused on simplicity in his design without adding a "bit more" when it came to the blades, as well as how Fujimoto incorporates comedy into his designs. Denji was Kaku's favorite character from Chainsaw Man and he drew an illustration of Denji to commemorate him.

Design by Tatsuki Fujimoto of Denji's hybrid form in his Public Safety Devil Hunter uniform

=== Casting ===
Among voice actors featured in the series, Kikunosuke Toya was chosen to voice Denji despite his lack of fame. Toya was glad to have been chosen for the role. At the first studio audition, the director told him not to make his work look like an anime. Toya felt he did not have initial good responses to his first works. However, he was eventually chosen to voice Denji. The actor recalled being nervous as he read the script the night before. However, the staff were kind to him which made his job easier and helped him relax.

For the English dub of the series, Ryan Colt Levy voices Denji. The actor describes Denji as "pure" due to how honest and relatable he comes across as a result of how open he is about his feelings. Levy noted that the anime adaptation toned down a scene where the character becomes aggressive so he could not give that side of the protagonist's personality. Levy felt pressure when voicing Denji as a result of the series and character's popularity.

== Appearances ==
=== Part 1 – Public Safety Arc ===
Denji is a young man trapped in poverty, working off his deceased father's debt to the yakuza by working as a Devil Hunter, aided by Pochita, his canine companion. Denji is betrayed by the yakuza, who kill him for a contract with the Zombie Devil. Pochita makes a contract with Denji, merging with him as a Devil-human hybrid, under the condition that Denji shows his dreams to Pochita. Denji kills the Zombie Devil and massacres the yakuza, and is approached by a team of governmental Devil Hunters, the Public Safety Division, led by Makima, the first person to be kind to him, who hugs him after he asks her to do so and persuades him to join their ranks. Agreeing, Denji is partnered with Power, the Blood Fiend, and Aki Hayakawa, a self-destructive Devil Hunter. After showing him how to connect with someone on a deeper level, and asking him always to remember her bite on his finger, "even if he goes blind," Makima promises Denji any favor, provided he kills the Gun Devil - perpetrator of the greatest massacre in human history.

Denji and Power are trained by Kishibe, a master Devil Hunter, after yakuza members Samurai Sword and Akane Sawatari attack the division. The Division launches a counter-attack against the Katana Man, capturing him, although Akane is killed. Sometime later, Denji begins a romance with a young woman named Reze, who is actually the Bomb Devil, a hybrid spy for the Soviet Union, sent to capture him. Makima secretly captures her. Denji's fight with Bomb Devil reveals his existence to the world. Foreign assassin groups target Denji. Denji is outfitted with a security detail, including Hirofumi Yoshida, a Private Sector Devil Hunter contracting the Octopus Devil. Though the brothers are repelled, and Quanxi initially stalls, Santa Claus uses their Doll Devil powers for a large horde attack before transporting everyone to Hell, where the Darkness Devil attacks. Makima defeats the Darkness Devil before killing Quanxi and Santa Claus and rescuing the Division. After Denji recovers, Makima reveals the Gun Devil is actually a geopolitical asset, with many factions controlling pieces of it. Makima almost defeats the Gun Devil, though Aki is killed in the process, and his body is taken as the Gun Fiend. Denji is attacked by the Gun Fiend, but kills it with the help of civilians. While seemingly consoling him, Makima betrays Denji after he wishes to become her dog by suddenly killing Power and reveals herself as the Control Devil, who herself is responsible for Denji's losses, having plotted to void his contract with Pochita by crushing his dreams of a normal life.

Controlling Denji's body, Pochita assumes his true form and runs. Makima explains her apparent goals: to use the Chainsaw Devil's power to eliminate concepts from reality to create a world without suffering, where everyone is equal; to this end, she was empowered by the government with immortality. Power revives as the Blood Devil from a remnant of her blood from Denji, restores Denji's will to live, having him promise to find her and make her Power once more when she is reborn in Hell. Denji battles Makima, uses a chainsaw made from Power's blood to kill her, and eats her flesh in an "act of love" to bypass her immortality. Later, Kishibe reveals the Control Devil resurfaced in the form of a little girl, now named Nayuta. He asks Denji to look after her, and Pochita supports this mission in Denji's dreams. Later, Denji enrolls in high school and continues fighting devils under the public eye.

=== Part 2 – School Arc ===
Denji has adapted to his new life as an ordinary high school student, attending Fourth East. He sells recycled cigarettes for a living while using his newfound superhero fame as the Chainsaw Man to attract women. He later meets Asa Mitaka, a student who is secretly the War Devil Yoru's vessel, and immediately disbelieves him when he tries to convince her he is the Chainsaw Man. Disgusted with his behavior, she plots to turn Denji into her weapon for Chainsaw Man, unaware of his true nature.

Denji helps Asa fight her former friend Yuko, who flees afterwards, only to be killed by an impostor posing as Denji. Later, Asa takes Denji on a date in the aquarium, where they, along with Hirofumi and a few other students, are trapped by the Eternity Devil. Asa kills the Eternity Devil using the entire aquarium as a weapon. Then, Yoru possesses Asa and attempts to create a "Denji Spinal Cord Sword," only for it to fail without Denji recognizing the attempt on his life. After this, Denji fights the Falling Devil, who attempts to use Denji's past trauma against him, only for him to cut his brain with one of his chainsaws so he can continue fighting, something he apparently always does when fighting Devils with mental attacks.

As Denji is in the process of being killed, Pochita sacrifices himself to create a timeline in which he does not exist. Denji is saved by Power, who is hired with him by the Public Safety Division.

== Reception ==
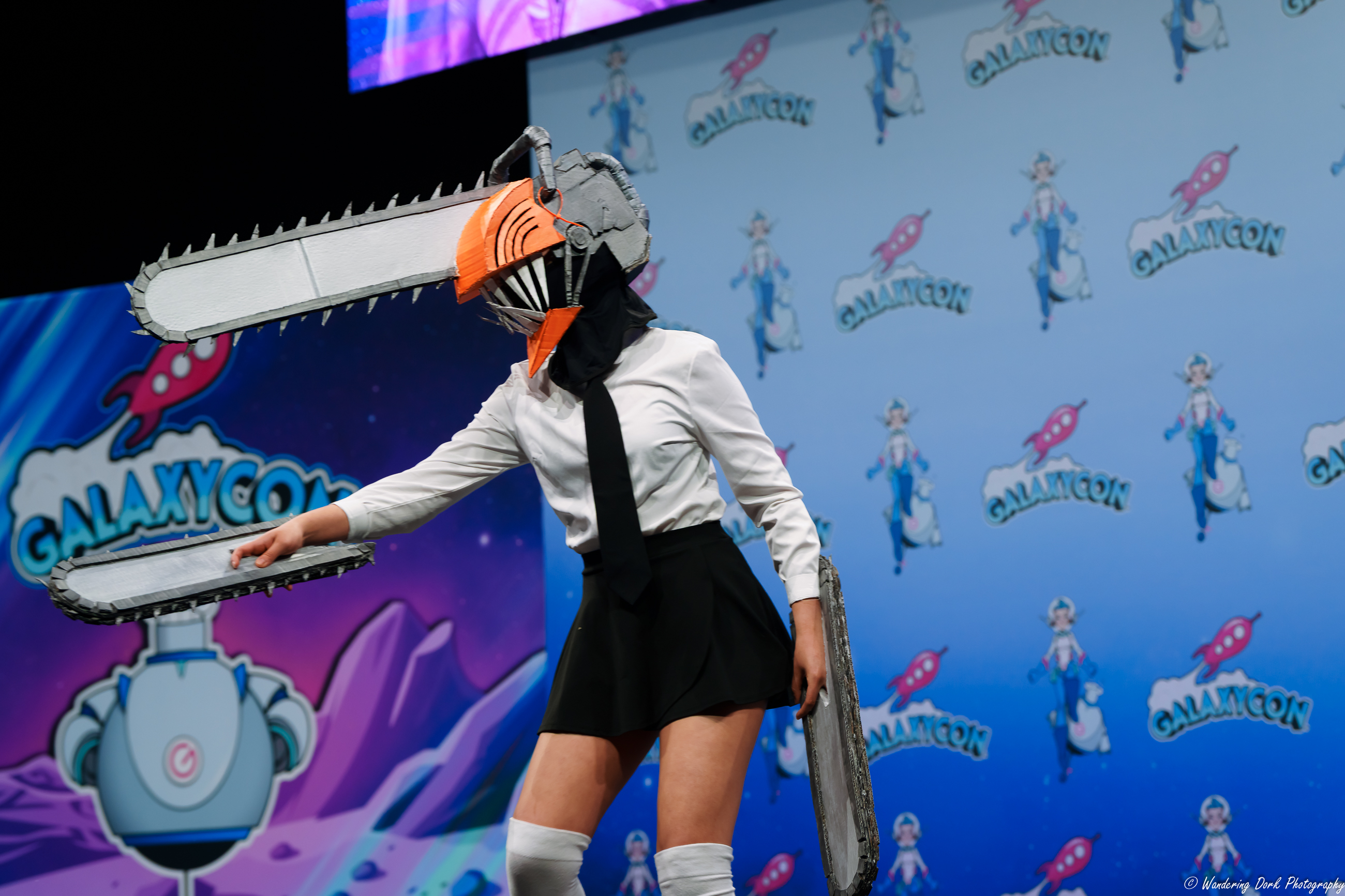
Cosplay at GalaxyCon Richmond

Early response to Denji led to comparisons to other heroes from the genre but mostly dark archetypes. Anna Neatrour of Manga Report called Denji an "incredibly damaged but potentially powerful hero." Due to his traits such as his devil powers, Denji has often been compared with Akira Fudo, the protagonist of Devilman while also acting as the audience surrogate. IGN found the backstory as too tortured but felt that his transformation into Chainsaw Man attracted the audience. The Manga Critic commented Denji might fit the mold of a shōnen protagonist on paper, but that the mold is "only there to be broken," comparing his "life on the fringes of society" to a "Dickensian parable about the plight of the working class." Dacey called Denji "a more honest shōnen hero than the typical Jump lead; he thinks and acts like a real teenage boy, right down to his self-absorption and total objectification of women," adding that she did not "ever warmed to Denji as a lead character." Lee commented that the series has an "interestingly goofy contrast between the characters and what's going on," adding that Denji's simple mind and "kind-of-horny instincts" can get tiring at times, but it does not make the series bad. Dacey discussed its unexpected moments of "genuine pathos," talking about the interactions between Denji and Pochita, noting as well parallels to Denji's relationship with Makima. Davidson also stated that the emotional part of the story is about the love between Denji and Pochita. In regards to the appeal of the action scenes, Anime News Network enjoyed MAPPA's handling of Denji's due to how gory and entertaining they are done. The Fandom Post called Denji "the antithesis of cool" due to how he is saved in an early by his partner Aki due to the stylish way in which he defeats the Devil while Denji kept suffering from a major wound.

Critics enjoyed the handling of Denji's interest of sex; several further praised how the writing helps to make the platonic relationship between Denji and Power feel genuine contrasting his deeper attraction with Makima. Comic Book Resources saw him as a seemingly unique Devil Hunter due to his simplicity, his relationship with his teammates and ambiguous last moments with Pochita who saves him from death in his debut. Reviewing the series' 97th and last chapter published in Weekly Shōnen Jump, Reiichi Narima of Real Sound commented that Denji's growth through loss is a storytelling more related to seinen manga than shōnen manga, adding that he was "deeply moved" by the inclusion of this kind of stories in the magazine, ultimately calling it a masterpiece and concluding: "at the core of bloody violence, there was a boy's sad love story." For the series' second story arc, Siliconera saw several parallels between Denji and the new protagonist Asa due to their connections with devils, as well as upbringing. Comic Book Resources did not notice major changes within Denji's characterization after several chapters and found it unsetting how his bond with Power seemingly faded as the protagonist only cares about becoming popular rather than searching a devil. CBR compared and contrasted Denji's relationship with Makima to that of Satoru Gojo and Yuji Itadori in Jujutsu Kaisen, as well as Jiraiya and Naruto Uzumaki in Naruto. Skyler Allen drew attention to Makima's "apparent kindness" towards Denji and contrasted it with the latter's other interactions in the series, highlighting Denji's relationship with Makima as a "truly intimate moment" from his perspective as opposed to the other interactions being "purely transactional", despite the dramatic irony of viewers catching on to Makima's malevolent nature.

In a popularity poll of the manga, Denji took second place behind Power. In another poll, he took fourth place. Denji also inspired several cosplays according to IGN. In one such cosplay, Denji's hybrid form was replicated with props resembling revving chainsaws. At the 8th Crunchyroll Anime Awards, Denji was nominated for "Best Main Character". Five of Denji's international voice actors were nominated for the "Best Voice Artist Performance" category, namely Kikunosuke Toya (Japanese), Ryan Colt Levy (English), Emilio Treviño (Spanish), Joel Gómez Jimenez (Castilian), and Mosè Singh (Italian); Levy, Treviño, Jimenez, and Singh won their respective awards, while Toya lost to Yuichi Nakamura's Satoru Gojo. At the 10th edition, two of Denji's international voice actors have been nominated for "Best Voice Artist Performance", namely Kikunosuke Toya (Japanese) and Mosè Singh (Italian); Singh eventually won while Toya lost to Aoi Yūki's Maomao.
