= Crunchyroll Anime Award for Best New Series =

- Awarded for: Best new anime series of the previous year
- Country: United States; Japan
- First award: Wit Studio and CloverWorks — Spy × Family (2023)
- Currently held by: Bones Film — Gachiakuta (2026)

Highlights
- Most nominations: Studio: CloverWorks (4)
- Website: Crunchyroll Anime Awards

The Crunchyroll Anime Award for Best New Series is a series award given at the Crunchyroll Anime Awards since its seventh edition in 2023. It is given for the best new anime series which only considered the first season that debuted from the previous year. Winners are determined through a combined voting process by judges and public voting.

Action-spy comedy anime Spy × Family by Wit Studio and CloverWorks first won the award in 2023. CloverWorks received the most nominations (4) for an anime studio.

In the latest edition in 2026, Gachiakuta by Bones Film won the award.

== Winners and nominees ==
In the following list, the first titles listed in gold are the winners; those not in gold are nominees, which are listed in alphabetical order. The years given are those in which the ceremonies took place.

=== 2020s ===
| Year | Anime | Studio(s) |
2021/2022 (7th)
| 2021/2022 (7th) | Spy × Family | Wit Studio and CloverWorks |
| 2021/2022 (7th) | Call of the Night | Liden Films |
| 2021/2022 (7th) | Cyberpunk: Edgerunners | Studio Trigger and CD Projekt |
| 2021/2022 (7th) | Lycoris Recoil | A-1 Pictures |
| 2021/2022 (7th) | My Dress-Up Darling | CloverWorks |
| 2021/2022 (7th) | Ya Boy Kongming! | P.A. Works |
2022/2023 (8th)
| 2022/2023 (8th) | Chainsaw Man | MAPPA |
| 2022/2023 (8th) | Bocchi the Rock! | CloverWorks |
| 2022/2023 (8th) | Heavenly Delusion | Production I.G |
| 2022/2023 (8th) | Hell's Paradise | MAPPA |
| 2022/2023 (8th) | Oshi no Ko | Doga Kobo |
| 2022/2023 (8th) | Zom 100: Bucket List of the Dead | Bug Films |
2023/2024 (9th)
| 2023/2024 (9th) | Solo Leveling | A-1 Pictures |
| 2023/2024 (9th) | Dandadan | Science SARU |
| 2023/2024 (9th) | Delicious in Dungeon | Studio Trigger |
| 2023/2024 (9th) | Frieren: Beyond Journey's End | Madhouse |
| 2023/2024 (9th) | Kaiju No. 8 | Production I.G |
| 2023/2024 (9th) | The Apothecary Diaries | Toho Animation Studio and OLM |
2025 (10th)
| 2025 (10th) | Gachiakuta | Bones Film |
| 2025 (10th) | Clevatess | Lay-duce |
| 2025 (10th) | Sakamoto Days | TMS Entertainment |
| 2025 (10th) | Takopi's Original Sin | Enishiya |
| 2025 (10th) | The Fragrant Flower Blooms with Dignity | CloverWorks |
| 2025 (10th) | The Summer Hikaru Died | CygamesPictures |

== Records ==
As of 2025, CloverWorks holds the record for the most nominations in an anime studio.

As of 2025, 24 nominations have been given to 19 different studios, of which there are 3 joint nominations consisting of two studios, given a total of 27 nominees so far. Only CloverWorks and MAPPA have received multiple nominations in one year, as well as the most nominations for a single year with two in 2022 and 2023 respectively.

CloverWorks received the nominations (4) for an anime studio.

| Studio | Wins | Nominations | Seasons |
|---|---|---|---|
| CloverWorks | 1 | 4 | Bocchi the Rock!, My Dress-Up Darling, Spy × Family, The Fragrant Flower Blooms with Dignity |
| A-1 Pictures | 1 | 2 | Lycoris Recoil, Solo Leveling |
| MAPPA | 1 | 2 | Chainsaw Man, Hell's Paradise |
| Production I.G | 0 | 2 | Heavenly Delusion, Kaiju No. 8 |
| Studio Trigger | 0 | 2 | Cyberpunk: Edgerunners, Delicious in Dungeon |
