= 18th Seiyu Awards =

2024 voice acting award in Tokyo

- Awarded for: Voice acting in Japan
- Date: March 9, 2024
- Location: JOQR Media Plus Hall; Minato, Tokyo
- Country: Japan

Highlights
- Best Lead Actors: Kana Ichinose; Kazuki Ura
- Best Supporting Actors: Yōhei Azakami; Manaka Iwami; Mamiko Noto
- Website: www.seiyuawards.jp

The 18th Seiyu Awards was held on March 9, 2024, at the JOQR Media Plus Hall in Minato, Tokyo. The winners of the Merit Awards, the Kei Tomiyama Award, and the Kazue Takahashi Award were announced on February 20, 2024. The rest of the winners were announced on the ceremony day.

Winners	Agency
Best Actors in a Leading Role
Kana Ichinose	Sigma Seven
Kazuki Ura	VIMS
Best Actors in Supporting Roles
Yōhei Azakami	Aoni Production
Manaka Iwami	Raccoon Dog
Mamiko Noto	Office Osawa
Best New Actors
Yurie Igoma	81 Produce
Yuki Sakakihara	81 Produce
Kikunosuke Toya	Sony Music Artists
Nanoka Hara	Tristone Entertainment
Hina Yōmiya	Aoni Production
Singing Award
Winners	Record Label
Kessoku Band (Hitori Gotō, Nijika Ijichi, Ryō Yamada, Ikuyo Kita)	Stray Beat

Merit Award
Winners	Agency
Toshio Furukawa	Aoni Production
Eiko Yamada	81 Produce
Kei Tomiyama Memorial Award
Winner	Agency
Nozomu Sasaki	Inspire
Kazue Takahashi Memorial Award
Winner	Agency
Akemi Okamura	Mausu Promotion
Game Award
Winner	Agency
Yūya Uchida	Haikyō
Synergy Award
Winner
The First Slam Dunk
Kids/Family Award
Winner
Cast of The Super Mario Bros. Movie
Foreign Movie/Series Award
Winner	Agency
Mitsuki Takahata	Horipro
Kunio Murai	Tom Project
Influencer Award
Winner	Agency
Sumire Uesaka	Voice Kit
Most Valuable Seiyū Award
Winner	Agency
Yūichi Nakamura	INTENTION

== Not awarded ==
These awards were not given and was listed as N/A, while the other award honored the voice actors who recently died, on their website.

- Personality Award
- Special Honor Award
