= My Hero Academia season 8 =

Eighth season of My Hero Academia

My Hero Academia
- Season 8
- Cover art for the first home media volume of the eighth and final season as released by Toho Animation in February 2026
- No. of episodes: 11

Release
- Original network: ytv, NTV
- Original release: October 4 – December 13, 2025

Season chronology
- ← Previous; Season 7 Next → "More"

The eighth and final season of the My Hero Academia anime television series, also known as My Hero Academia: Final Season, was produced by Bones Film and directed by Kenji Nagasaki (chief director) and Naomi Nakayama, following the story of Kōhei Horikoshi's original My Hero Academia manga series from the beginning of the 40th volume through the end of the 42nd and final volume (chapters 399–430). In July 2025, Horikoshi was confirmed to being heavily involved in the production, and would provide the new original scenes that were not included in the manga. The eighth and final season aired from October 4 to December 13, 2025, concluding the season with a total of 11 episodes. A bonus television special that adapts chapter 431, which was bundled with the final volume of the manga, premiered on May 2, 2026.

The season begins from where the previous seventh season left off and follows the remaining final battles between the Heroes and Villains including Izuku Midoriya and Tomura Shigaraki, and All Might and All For One as the fate of the world hanging in the balance. With both sides pushing themselves to the limits, Izuku is determined to save the world and become the greatest hero while depicting the future of hero society and characters' lives.

A special theatrical event titled My Hero Academia Final Season: Ultra Screening, was held in 12 Japanese theaters on December 13, 2025, and featuring all episodes of the final season including the final episode that coincides with the television airing. Crunchyroll licensed the season outside of Asia and streamed it along with an English dub two weeks after the original airing on its streaming service of the same name. Medialink licensed the season in Asia-Pacific.

For the eighth and final season: the opening theme song is "The Revo", performed by Porno Graffitti, who previously provided the opening theme song "The Day" from the first season, while the ending theme song is "I", performed by Bump of Chicken.

== Episodes ==
No. overall	No. in season	Title	Directed by	Storyboarded by	Original release date	Viewership rating
160	1	"Toshinori Yagi: Rising / Origin"; Transliteration: "Yagi Toshinori: Raijingu Orijin" (Japanese: 八木俊典：ライジングオリジン)	Masayuki Otsuki	Naomi Nakayama	October 4, 2025	3.9%
All Might continues his hard-hitting battle against the rewinding All For One, pushing his armored suit to its limits. Despite All For One's taunts, All Might remains confident in making the Villain overuse his Quirks to rapidly increase the Rewind effect, and lures him into a trap, unleashing a giant laser barrage onto him. Meanwhile, back at the Troy battlefield, the Villain Kunieda has incapacitated almost all the Heroes in the area, leaving only Yuga Aoyama left. After he derides the "traitor", Aoyama declares his intention to keep following in the light of his classmates and starts flashing his leaking Navel Laser, allowing the invisible Toru Hagakure to use the light to knock the Villain out. As a result of Aoyama's power, Toru's invisibility starts to glitch, and she becomes visible while the two begin rescuing the Heroes. All Might uses his remaining tools to keep All For One contained as long as possible until the laser overheats, with a child-sized, glowing All For One emerging from the crater. Before he can fight back, his body suddenly freezes in place, as Stain appears to aid All Might in the fight.
161	2	"The End of an Era, and the Beginning" (Note: Stylized in start case) (Note: Episode 161's title was originally promoted as "The End of an Era, and ―" until its broadcast, which revealed the true episode title.)	Tomo Ōkubo	Tomo Ōkubo	October 11, 2025	3.5%
Stain and All Might charge at the paralyzed All For One, however the Villain uses several of his Quirks to break free. Annoyed at his refusal to submit to him, All For One proceeds to kill Stain and steal his Quirk; Stain uses his last words to tell All Might to live on and succeed. The last remnants of the Armored All Might also sacrifice itself to save him from a deadly attack; he sees hallucinations of Nana Shimura and Sir Nighteye pushing him to keep fighting. Now in range of U.A., and Deku and Tomura Shigaraki's battle, All For One attempts to warp Shigaraki to him, but the Villain forcibly rejects his former Master's interference. Instead, All For One drags All Might towards U.A., intending to kill him in front of everyone, with Deku unable to help or else break the stalemate he has with Shigaraki. All Might prepares to activate a failsafe on the remaining piece of his suit to blow them both up, thinking about memories of his youth in the process. However, All For One destroys it and paralyzes All Might, gloating about his failure to defeat him. People around the world watch on in horror as All For One begins to tear All Might's body in two, and as Deku begs for anyone to save him, a revived Katsuki Bakugo emerges from atop U.A.
162	3	"The Final Boss!!"; Transliteration: "Rasu Bosu!!" (Japanese: ラスボス!!)	Nanami Michibata & Michiru Itabisashi	Nanami Michibata, Kōhei Hirota (Note: Credited as Hiro) & Sōta Shigetsugu (Note: Credited as Hone Hone)	October 18, 2025	3.5%
Deku uses Gearshift on Bakugo and launches him towards All Might and All For One. Despite his seemingly imminent demise, Bakugo, fuelled by the hopes and prayers of everyone begging for All Might to be saved, shoots forward at insane speeds, ripping the former Symbol of Peace out of All For One's hands, overwriting Sir Nighteye's vision. While recovering, a thread-sized Edgeshot emerges from Bakugo's body, having used his Quirk to repair his body from the inside, and revealing it was his own explosive sweat that resuscitated him back to life. All Might gives Bakugo the last remnant of his armor, named after him, which he accepts with a smile. A furious All For One attempts to refocus his mind on Shigaraki, only for Bakugo to appear before him, declaring himself "the final boss". All For One tries to ignore Bakugo and continue towards One For All, seeing the young hero as just another "pebble" in his path, but thanks to understanding how his Explosion Quirk works, Bakugo is able to keep up with the Villain. Increasingly infuriated, All For One continues seeing flashes of the Second User in Bakugo, the one he truly hates the most, calling him "Kudo" in outrage, to which Bakugo responds by declaring himself as "Kacchan Bakugo".
163	4	"Quirk: Explosion!!"; Transliteration: ""Kosei"!! Bakuha!!" (Japanese: "個性"!!爆破!!)	Masayuki Otsuki	Masayuki Otsuki	October 25, 2025	3.3%
In a flashback, twin brothers are born to a prostitute in an era before Quirks were known, washed away in the river together on their mother's corpse. Within the next couple of years, the Luminescent Baby is born, and Meta Abilities become recognized, inciting fear and confusion among the general public. The older brother uses his Meta Ability to steal and kill from others in order to survive, while pushing around the younger brother, who begged him not to hurt others. One day, the older brother sees the younger brother reading the Captain Hero comic books, hoping to be a hero like him. However, the older brother is inspired by the Demon Lord who ruled in fear, so he kills the Luminescent Baby and, as taken from the comic book, dubs himself "All For One". Sometime later, the younger brother, Yoichi, is freed from his grasp by a resistance led by Kudo, so All For One kills Yoichi, reclaiming just his hand. He then realizes that Yoichi's essence no longer exists in the hand, while Kudo's partner, Bruce, discovers a second Factor within his body; after being sprayed with his blood, Yoichi's Quirk Factor is now in Kudo. Over the decades, All For One began his quest to reclaim Yoichi, now as the Quirk "One For All", as it is transferred from user to user, always evading him, until his defeat at All Might's hands, barely surviving thanks to Doctor Garaki reclaiming his body. In the present, an unhinged All For One decides to release all of his Quirks at once in a monstrous blob, in order to kill Bakugo and reach Shigaraki at once. Despite the danger, Bakugo confidently attacks him, throwing the Villain off balance, further disrupted by the Quirk Factors within his body rebelling once again. Bakugo finally defeats All For One with a massive explosion, who emerges from a crater as an infant, desperately trying to crawl forward. An exhausted Bakugo stands defiant until victory has been achieved, as All For One cries out until he disappears out of existence. Bakugo lies on the ground, fist in the air, telling Izuku to "give him hell".
164	5	"History's Greatest Villain"; Transliteration: "Shijō Saiaku no Viran" (Japanese: 史上最悪の敵(ヴィラン))	Tsuyoshi Tobita	Naomi Nakayama & Haruka Iida	November 1, 2025	3.7%
As the hero and villain continue their devastating struggle, Shigaraki gets close enough to graze Deku, managing to break through the vestige realm, stealing Hikage Shinomori and Danger Sense, revealing he has the superior willpower to steal One For All. Now able to easily dodge Deku's attacks, Shigaraki goes on the offensive, knocking them both all the way to Mt. Fuji, as Deku realizes Shigaraki plans to start his plan for mass destruction by decaying the mountain, causing it to erupt. Even despite the One For All users fear of the "ruin incarnate" Villain, Deku stands his ground, believing that there is a person deep down within Shigaraki. Deku uses several combination of Quirks to attack Shigaraki and halt his Decay, but the Villain's Danger Sense, Search, and Regeneration all prove too much for the hero to handle, as he succumbs to Gearshift's blowback. Shigaraki attempts to dissuade Deku's attempts to reach out to him, revealing he has consumed the "crying boy" in a leaden mass in his heart, but Deku refuses to give in, wanting to understand what made him this way. Just then, the lingering spirit of Star and Stripe still within Shigaraki reveals to the users that she had left a scar in his leaden mass from their fight and that it could be broken. Kudo, having initially disapproved of Deku's ideals, realizes the only way to truly defeat Shigaraki is to forcibly transfer One For All into the Villain's body, attacking his soul directly while preventing the Quirks from being usable. Deku is worried about giving up All Might's gift, but he accepts, proceeding to use Blackwhip to reinforce his entire body to move.
165	6	"Wrench It Open, Izuku Midoriya!!"; Transliteration: "Kojiakero! Midoriya Izuku!!" (Japanese: こじ開けろ！緑谷出久!!)	Shōji Ikeno	Shōji Ikeno	November 8, 2025	3.1%
Using this new form, Deku goes on the offensive planning to get close enough to transfer Gearshift into Shigaraki. After preventing another spread of Decay, Deku uses Smokescreen and Blackwhip with blood on it to trick Shigaraki and Search, allowing him to get up close. Shigaraki instinctively starts regrowing his defensive fingers to protect himself, but Deku manages to land a direct punch, transferring Kudo and Gearshift into the Villain's body, destroying the Quirk and hitting the scar in the soul. As Deku and Shigaraki's memories begin to overlap due to One For All and All For One's assimilation, Deku goes for another transfer, however only En and Smokescreen break through, with Shigaraki rejecting the rest. Meanwhile, a drone piloted by Mei Hatsume records the battle, allowing it to be broadcast by La Brava. A worried Eri wants to help him in some way, and is comforted by Kota. As U.A. is being evacuated, Momo and Kaminari watch the battle on the phone, worrying about Deku. A news helicopter arrives in Gunga to take Ochaco to the hospital. Rock Lock and Lady Nagant also watch the fight, as they talk about how Deku is not just trying to punish evil but make the Villain lose the will to his path. Deku finally breaks through Shigaraki's fingers, finding himself in front of the Shimura Family home, with Nana as the only vestige left. After seeing warnings and visions of Shigaraki's past adversaries, Deku finally breaks into the home, only for him and Nana to witness Tenko being slapped by his father Kotaro.
166	7	"From Aizawa"; Transliteration: "Aizawa-kun kara" (Japanese: 相澤くんから)	Tomo Ōkubo	Tomo Ōkubo	November 15, 2025	3.3%
Nana breaks down in tears over the display, realizing how much pain she has inadvertently caused her son over leaving him. She and Izuku are able to break through and intervene, Nana apologizing and fading away as the leaden soul is finally destroyed, while Izuku witnesses the moment Decay manifests within Tenko. Horrified, a now child Izuku steps in and grabs Tenko's hands, even as his own start to break apart. Tenko continues to try and reject him, saying it was his own choice to destroy to validate his own existence, but Izuku insists, telling him how much someone being there to reach out their hands to help means to him. Tenko finally gives in and lets go, however, turning back into Shigaraki, he declares that no matter if his hatred is stamped out, he is a Villain meant to destroy, and desires to be a hero for the Villains. Suddenly, as mysterious memories flash for the boys, All For One's vestige re-emerges and devours Shigaraki, regaining control. All For One then reveals to Shigaraki that he orchestrated his existence, from manipulating Kotaro, stealing his Quirk as a baby, and secretly giving him Decay, an altered copy of Overhaul. Shigaraki is broken down by the revelation, while Izuku is expelled from the vestige world. In the real world, All For One, now in control of Shigaraki's body, laments Yoichi and One For All's destruction declaring to proceed with hollow world domination. Deku discovers both his arms are completely destroyed, and before the Villain can attack, he is saved by Sero, Sato, and Ojiro, courtesy of Eraser Head. Shortly after he and Present Mic were warped away by Kurogiri, Oboro Shirakumo's personality re-emerged, allowing them to use Warp Gate freely again. He warps to the evacuation center, recruiting all the available Heroes to clean up the remaining battles before joining up with Deku. He uses Eri's horn on Deku, which she had cut off to Rewind his arms back. Just then, many Heroes and 1-A students begin appearing through Warp Gates.
167	8	"Izuku Midoriya Rising"; Transliteration: "Midoriya Izuku: Raijingu" (Japanese: 緑谷出久：ライジング)	Michiru Itabisashi & Naomi Nakayama	Haruka Iida	November 22, 2025	3.5%
All the remaining Heroes left standing join Deku for the final battle against All For One. Despite the Villain's annoyance and declaration that tragedies are what result in true strength, the Heroes go on the assault, attacking his massive onslaught of Quirk constructions, but unable to break through to the main book. After recovering, Deku uses the embers of One For All still within him to begin running straight towards the Villain. As he does so, the members of Class 1-A and other Heroes leap in front and counter all of All For One's attacks, allowing Deku to keep going, while telling him to "do your best". All For One soon realizes that Deku's strength is his "weakness" – unlike All Might he has a determination that inspires everyone around him to keep pushing. Everyone watching the broadcast repeats the encouragement towards Deku, including his mother, as he finally reaches the Villain and smashes him directly in the chest. As a result of the attacks and the damage of the transferred One For All within him, the body begins to shatter apart, but All For One desperately tries to keep himself together, intending to forcibly transfer his Quirk to someone else. Deku goes in to attack again, but is stopped by "Kurogiri", attempting to protect Shigaraki, until Bakugo appears and dissipates him. Deku goes in for one final blow, stating his pity to the "Demon Lord", when All For One is reunited with Yoichi's embers. While begging his younger brother not to leave him, Shigaraki, alongside the other One For All vestiges, re-emerges, and together with Deku, they destroy All For One for good. Deku and Shigaraki have one last conversation in the vestige realm, the latter lamenting he could not destroy anything and admitting he really was just that crying kid, and the former saying he wanted to stop his misery from spreading further. Shigaraki gives Deku his final words to say to Spinner, that he kept fighting to destroy. In the real world, Deku's massive final punch is so powerful it clears the skies, as Shigaraki's body decays away.
168	9	"Epilogue, The Hellish Todoroki Family: Final"; Transliteration: "Epirōgu / Jigoku no Todoroki-kun-chi: Fainaru" (Japanese: エピローグ/地獄の轟くん家・FINAL)	Hanako Ueda	Hanako Ueda	November 29, 2025	4.3%
In the aftermath of the war, restoration begins as any available Heroes, particularly those from America and around the world, assist in the cause. At Central Hospital, a doctor informs Bakugo about the significant damage to his body and arm, but he insists on going through the long rehab process. Izuku and All Might recover together in another room, as Izuku laments on being unable to save Shigaraki's life, but when he remembers his genuine smile as he told him to "do his best", All Might surmises that Izuku did save his soul. Bakugo then learns that Izuku only has the embers of One For All left and will be Quirkless again, causing him to break down in tears, believing he would be able to keep competing with him. All Might proceeds to cheer the boys up, calling them both his heroes. By June, the students return to U.A., as they finally put on their third-year graduation. Tamaki and Nejire receive their diplomas, and Mirio gives a speech about how they must look to the future to bring back what they have lost. The former Class 1-A meet up in 2-A, with Eraser Head once again as their teacher. Aoyama reveals that he will be leaving the class due to his role as All For One's spy, wanting to atone in his own way; Hitoshi Shinso is then revealed to be taking his spot in the class. Later, Shoto meets up with the rest of his family to visit Toya, locked up in a life support unit, slowly on the verge of death. A crippled Endeavor reveals to Toya that he will be retiring as a hero, and even if it may be too late, he will come to visit him every day to talk. As the family leaves when Toya reaches his limit, Shoto asks him what his favourite food is; he responds soba, which Shoto agrees with, causing Toya to tear up, internally apologizing to Shoto. Natsuo reaffirms he wants nothing more to do with Endeavor, while his father firmly states he will continue to take responsibility for the rest of his life.
169	10	"The Girl Who Loves Smiles"; Transliteration: "Egao ga Sukina Onnanoko" (Japanese: 笑顔が好きな女の子)	Tsuyoshi Tobita	Kenji Nagasaki	December 6, 2025	3.4%
As the new Hero Public Safety Commission President, Hawks pardons Lady Nagant, however she chooses to stay in prison for now to see how the world shapes out; Gentle is released and reunites with La Brava. Izuku visits Spinner in the hospital, learning the doctors were able to prevent him from turning into a Nomu. Izuku gives him Shigaraki's last words, causing him to break down and angrily berate the young boy for causing his friend's death. At the same time, a news broadcast discusses Shigaraki, with many civilians viewing him as just an irredeemable threat, while Spinner thinks about their friendship and what he wishes he could have done to help him. Spinner declares that he will write a book about the League of Villains so that nobody will forget Shigaraki, and Izuku determinately reaffirms that he will not forget. Izuku then learns that Kai Chisaki reunited with his Shie Hassaikai Boss, awakened from his coma thanks to support items, chastising his adopted son for everything he has done. Back at school, Izuku and his classmates meet the excited new first-years, leading to mixed feelings from the students. Class A assists several Heroes with reconstruction work in the city, with Bakugo reuniting with a slowly recovering Edgeshot; the new first-years, moved by their conversation with Class A, arrive to help out. Later that night, Ochaco, who had been putting on a happy front the entire time, goes to the Troy cliffs overseeing the city, where she and Izuku had previously discussed Himiko Toga, and breaks down in tears blaming herself for Toga's death. Izuku then appears, having noticed something off about her, and forces her to open up about her feelings. He reveals that she is his hero, ever since they first met during the Entrance Exam, all that she has done to support him, and wants to do the same for her, which she accepts. The rest of the class soon join in to cheer the both of them up. Later, Class A has their farewell party for Aoyama with Eri singing. Meanwhile, a mysterious boy emerges from an abandoned home.
170	11	"My Hero Academia"; Transliteration: "Boku no Hīrō Akademia" (Japanese: 僕のヒーローアカデミア)	Masayuki Otsuki	Naomi Nakayama	December 13, 2025	4.5%
A young boy who manifests a dark and dangerous Quirk is abused and later abandoned by his family. He eventually escapes from the destroyed house's ruins, angered to find everyone around him happy while he had to suffer. Before he can lash out however, he is stopped by the old woman who had previously refused to help a young Tenko, and inspired by Izuku's actions, offers her hand to help him, which he tearfully accepts. Eight years later, Izuku, now 24 years old, becomes a teacher at U.A., and is once again Quirkless after losing the embers of One For All by the time of their third year graduation, and records his memories in his notebooks. He also thinks about how all of his former classmates have become great Heroes. In a junior high school, the students are discussing what kinds of programs they would like to study in, with one kid, Dai, discouraged for wanting to be a hero despite having a weak Quirk. Dai goes to visit the All Might statue in Kamino, where Izuku also is reminiscing; Dai trips when trying to help another kid that Izuku helps. Dai voices his worries about being unable to be a hero, but Izuku reaffirms that he can be one, stating he already proved himself by trying to jump in to help, and tells him to "do your best". Soon afterwards, Izuku is surprised by All Might, who reveals that using the data from his fight against All For One, Mei Hatsume and Melissa Shield, with funding by the former Class A and Bakugo spearheading the initiative, created a new armored suit for Izuku to use to return to hero duty, which he tearfully accepts. Suiting up, he reunites with his former class, heading out together as he sees Shigaraki's ghost, continuing to move forward to help others.

== Home media release ==
=== Japanese ===
Toho Animation released the eighth season on Blu-ray and DVD in two volumes in Japan, with the first volume released on February 18, 2026, and the second volume released on May 20, 2026.

Toho Animation (Japan – Region 2/A)
Vol.	Episodes	Release date	Ref.
1	160–165	February 18, 2026	
2	166–170 + "More"	May 20, 2026	
