= List of Gachiakuta characters =

The Japanese manga series Gachiakuta features an extensive cast of characters created by Kei Urana.

== Cleaners ==
=== Team Akuta ===
==== Rudo Surebrec ====
Voiced by: Aoi Ichikawa, Yō Taichi (young) (Japanese); Bryson Baugus, Dee Meo (young) (English)

Rudo Surebrec (ルド・スレブレック, Rudo Sureburekku) is a former Sphereite, as well as Regto's adopted son, whose false convictions led to his sentencing to The Pit. After being saved from a group of trash beasts, he joins the Cleaners as part of his plan to enact murderous vengeance on his accusers and the true culprit. His vital instrument consists of 3R, a pair of gloves from the Watchman series, which were given to him by Regto before his death. Rudo's gloves allow him to give life to any three objects he wields, which are mainly trash since items that are still in good condition are harder for him to use. He would turn them into weapons or tools, though they would crumble after they had served their purpose. Rudo can focus the anima energy from three separate items into one item, boosting that specific item's power and even changing its form.

==== Enjin ====
Voiced by: Katsuyuki Konishi (Japanese); Christopher Wehkamp (English)

Enjin (エンジン) is a fellow member of the Cleaners who saves Rudo from a horde of trash beasts. He carries a vital instrument called Umbreaker, which takes the form of an umbrella. He is also the leader of Team Akuta, one of the teams that compose the Cleaners. His former name was Endoareilychima Illastsalli Machiada Leotrago Sphidi Pharjin (エンドアレイライキマ・イラスタスライ・マキアダ・レオドラゴ・スフィディ・ファージン, Endoareiraikima Irasutasurai Makiada Reodorago Sufidi Fājin). He was an orphan who lived in an institution that later became a slave market. However, he was saved by Alto Surebrec, a man who could travel from the Sphere to the Ground. Alto gave him the name Enjin, a shortened version of his real name, as well as Time Walk, a vital instrument of the Watchman series which allows him to project himself as a construct of Anima. This construct slows down Enjin's perception of time for a few seconds. However, whatever damage the construct deals during this time is also dealt to Enjin.

==== Zanka Nijiku ====
Voiced by: Yoshitsugu Matsuoka (Japanese); Corey Wilder (English)

Zanka Nijiku (ザンカ・ニジク) is a hard working Cleaner and master combatant, who was recruited by Enjin and part of Team Akuta. His vital instrument is a staff-like weapon called Lovely Assistaff, that when activated becomes sharp and metal. He is from a noble family in the Kamuatari District, who has a long-standing connection to the Hell Guards, a group of people who fight criminal Givers, and was initially trained to be a Hell Guard like his older siblings. However, after being beaten by another trainee named Hyo, he sat inside a well hoping to die before being found by Enjin and Riyo and later joined the Cleaners with them.

==== Riyo Reaper ====
Voiced by: Yumiri Hanamori (Japanese); Katie Caruso (English)

Riyo Reaper (リヨウ・リーパー, Riyō Rīpā) is a carefree, energetic, and outgoing member of the Cleaners whose vital instrument comes in the form of a pair of scissors called The Ripper. She is also a former hitman.

==== Eishia Stilza ====
Voiced by: Manaka Iwami (Japanese); Julie Shields (English)

Eishia Stilza (エイシア・スティルザ, Eishia Sutiruza) is August's shy younger sister and a member of the Akuta Cleaner team. She can heal people with her vital instrument Type:Heal, which has the appearance of a black power cord.

==== Shikage ====
Voiced by: Nobuhiko Okamoto (Japanese); Ethan Condon (English)

Shikage (シカゲ) is an extremely reclusive and elusive Cleaner and member of Team Akuta. His unknown vital instrument acts as a barrier that protects their headquarters.

=== Team Eager ===
==== Tamsy Caines ====
Voiced by: Mitsuki Saiga (Japanese); Adam Gibbs (English)

Tamsy Caines (タムジー・ケインズ, Tamujī Keinzu) is a seemingly kind senior member of the Cleaner team Eager. Using his vital instrument, Tokushin, a distaff, he can create a "net" of threads to trap a large number of people. The more the opponents struggle, the more tangled the threads become, making escape extremely difficult. He is a highly reliable and kind member of the Cleaners. However, he is actually the Angel, who can move between the Sphere and the Ground. He originally lived in the Sphere and desires to break Rudo's "shell" by experiencing negative emotions.

==== Delmon Gates ====
Voiced by: Masami Iwasaki (Japanese); Brent Mukai (English)

Delmon Gates (デルモン・ゲイツ, Derumon Geitsu) is a loud and passionate member of the Cleaner team Eager. Using his vital instrument, Thirst Quencher, he can control the water contents to attack the opponents that absorb water, the larger it absorbs makes it pop like a balloon which killed them. He was initially working as a farmer whom his wife was dreaming to plant a flower, as well as to fill the house with flowers.

=== Team Child ===
==== Bro Santa ====
Voiced by: Wataru Takagi (Japanese); Gerardo Davila (English)

Bro Santa (ブロ・サンタ, Buro Santa) is the apologetic and amicable supervisor of Team Child whose vital instrument, Cloth, is a bandana that converts into a whip.

==== Dear Santa ====
Voiced by: Hana Satō (Japanese); Naya Moreno (English)

Dear Santa (ディア・サンタ, Dia Santa) is a non-verbal and irritable ten-year-old Giver whose vital instrument, Centralian, is a pacifier that takes strength from enemies with every hit in order to give that strength to himself.

==== Guita Hebby Fantasia ====
Voiced by: Maria Naganawa (Japanese); Lara Woodhull (English)

Guita Hebby Fantasia (ギータ・ヘビィ・ファンタジア, Gīta Hebī Fantajia) is a loud, touchy, and childish teenager, who does not understand normal social cues and a member of Team Child. Her vital instrument is a kaiju onesie called Guita, allows her to transform into a giant kaiju monster.

=== Team Front ===
==== Arkha Corvus ====
Voiced by: Rikiya Koyama (Japanese); Gabe Kunda (English)

Arkha Corvus (アルハ・コルバス, Aruha Korubasu) is the strong and charismatic boss of the Cleaners, whose vital instrument seemingly gives him foresight.

==== Semiu Grier ====
Voiced by: Mie Sonozaki (Japanese); Kenneisha Thompson (English)

Semiu Grier (セミュ・グライア, Semyu Guraia) is the receptionist at the Cleaners' headquarters. Using her vital instrument, Eyes, which takes the form of a pair of glasses, she can examine the overall capacities of a giver, which gives them the efficiency needed to join the organization. This ability can also be used in combat to detect incoming attacks and slow down time.

==== Amo Empool ====
Voiced by: Kana Hanazawa (Japanese); Celeste Perez (English)

Amo Empool (アモ・エンプール, Amo Enpūru) is a traumatized and abused young girl and the Lady of Penta, an individual who claims to have witnessed people cross the border. She is later kidnapped and locked in a dungeon. She is later rescued by Rudo and the Cleaners, after which she becomes a member of their group. Her vital instrument is the Watchman Boots, which release a scent that can make others see things and move to her will. Despite their hostile beginnings, she and Rudo grow close following their reunion.

=== Team Danger ===
==== Adderoy Twins ====
The Adderoy Twins (アダーロイ兄弟, Adāroi Kyōdai), Otto (オットー, Ottō) and Epalte (エパルテ, Eparute), are a pair of highly energetic twins, who are members of Team Danger at the South branch of the Cleaners. Their vital instrument is Twin Dolls, small handheld toys that grow to become giants that follow the movements of the twins and can carry out mass destruction.

=== Supporters ===
==== Gris Rubion ====
Voiced by: Satoshi Hino (Japanese); Christopher Guerrero (English)

Gris Rubion (グリス・ルビオン, Gurisu Rubion) is an honorable and kind member of the Cleaner team Supporter whom despite lacking his vital instrument, he has an incredible physical strength and can rely on other skills.

==== Follo Tunito ====
Voiced by: Kazuki Ura (Japanese); Aiden Call (English)

Follo Tunito (フォロ・ツニート, Foro Tsunīto) is a polite and friendly member of the Cleaner team Supporter. He became a Giver after receiving his own vital instrument, Alan, which is a small hammer that converts into a giant sledgehammer from built up stress into a powerful attack.

==== Tomme Mima ====
Voiced by: Hisako Tōjō (Japanese); Ezra Vervin (English)

Tomme Mima (トウム・ミマ, Tōmu Mima) is a compassionate member of the Cleaner team Supporter. She is responsible for taking notes and recording information about the Trash Beasts.

==== Meriege ====
Meriege (メリージ, Merīju) appears to be a calm, friendly, and mild-mannered person Supporter in the South Branch of the Cleaners alongside Mildretta.

==== Mildretta ====
Mildretta (ミルドレッタ, Mirudoretta) is a tall, muscular and curt Supporter, who comes from the warrior tribe Sileia. She is the complete opposite of her partner Meriege.

=== Other Cleaners ===
==== August Stilza ====
Voiced by: Mamoru Miyano (Japanese); Branden Loera (English)

August Stilza (オーガスト・スティルザ, Ōgasuto Sutiruza) is an eccentric artisan who designs the Cleaners' masks and clothing.

==== Fu Orostor ====
Voiced by: Hiro Shimono (Japanese); Austin Tindle (English)

Fu Orostor (フウ・オロストル, Fū Orosutoru) is a former rookie member of the Raiders, he was once a coward who hid behind orders to evade responsibility. His vital instrument is Hii, a cursed doll that, when activated, assumes control of his body. This possession grants him immense physical strength and imposes a far more violent and aggressive personality.

== Raiders ==
=== Zodyl Typhon ===
Voiced by: Shunsuke Takeuchi (Japanese); Ian Sinclair (English)

Zodyl Typhon (ゾディル・テュフォン, Zodiru Tyufon) is the boss of the Raiders. He is a cold, cunning and calculating man, rarely expressing any emotion. His vital instrument is Mishra, a coat of the Watchmen Series, which allows him to mutate his body to resemble the shape and traits of anything he eats.

=== Jabber Wonger ===
Voiced by: Yuuki Shin (Japanese); Zeno Robinson (English)

Jabber Wonger (ジャバー・ウォンガー, Jabā Wongā) is a masochistic member of the Raiders who is obsessed with fighting people stronger than him. His vital instrument is Mankira, ten rings he wears on his hands, that can turn into claws, which contain various neurotoxins and poison.

=== Cthoni Andor ===
Voiced by: Ayahi Takagaki (Japanese); Tia Ballard (English)

Cthoni Andor (クトーニ・アンドール, Kutōni Andōru) is a reserved and quiet member of the Raiders whose vital instrument, Manhole, allows her to teleport anywhere but in bright places.

=== Noerde Hew Amozo ===
Voiced by: Mutsumi Tamura (Japanese); Corey Pettit (English)

Noerde Hew Amozo (ネルデ・ヒュウ・アモゾ, Nerude Hyū Amozo) hails from the warrior tribe called Sileia and is a prideful rookie of the Raiders. Her vital instrument is Mirei, an ornate comb that allows Noerde's hair to get charged with static electricity when she straightens her hair using it, electrocuting anyone and anything that makes contact with her hair.

=== Bundus Begalkeit ===
Voiced by: Akio Otsuka (Japanese); Brian Mathis (English)

Bundus Begalkeit (ブンドゥス・ベガルケイト, Bundusu Begarukeito) is an older, extremely tall and muscular Raider. His vital instrument is Hands; a group of 6 mechanical arms that pops out of the pipes he carries on his back. He acquired a hand at each major development of his life, all with different abilities.

=== Momoa Rukel ===
Momoa Rukel (モモア・リュケル, Momoa Ryukeru) is a careless teenage Raider, who likes to be immersed in music. Her vital instrument is Asyl, a pair of headphones, with which she can hear all the memories of anyone she touches while it is active.

=== Konza ===
Voiced by: Yoshihito Sasaki (Japanese); Nasim Benelkour (English)

Konza (コンザ), also known as the Snowshoe Master, is a low-level Raider. His vital instrument is Snowshoes, a pair of snowshoes which allows for mobility in all sorts of terrain whether it be clay or mud with ease.

== Hell Guard ==
=== Hyo ===
Voiced by: Kaori Nazuka (Japanese); Monica Flatley (English)

Hyo (ヒョウ, Hyō) is a practical, apathetic Hell Guard trainee, who trained together with Zanka. She is a highly-skilled hand-to-hand combatant, who learned an unorthodox and unpredictable fighting style while growing up on the streets.

=== Kyouka Nijiku ===
Voiced by: Miyuki Sawashiro (Japanese); Dani Chambers (English)

Kyouka Nijiku (キョウカ・ニジク, Kyōka Nijiku) is a very fierce, tough, and intimidating Hell Guard, commander of Red Horns Squad one. Wielding guns, she is very proficient in battling Givers. She is Zanka's elder sister and the eldest daughter in the Nijuku family.

=== Goka Nijiku ===
Goka Nijiku (ゴウカ・ニジク, Gōka Nijiku) is a serious and blunt Hell Guard, and second-in-command of the Red Horns Squad under his older sister Kyouka. He is also Zanka's older brother and the middle child in the Nijuku family.

== Sphereites ==
=== Regto ===
Voiced by: Toshiyuki Morikawa (Japanese); John Burgmeier (English)

Regto (レグト, Reguto) is a carefree Sphereite and Rudo's adoptive father.

=== Chiwa ===
Voiced by: Miku Itō (Japanese); Reshel Mae (English)

Chiwa (チワ) is a Sphereite and the girl Rudo had a crush on before he is thrown into the Pit. She rejected and disowned Rudo after he was framed, believing him to be a real murderer, and he never saw her again.

== Other characters ==
Alice Stilza (アリス・スティルザ, Arisu Sutiruza)
Voiced by: Ryūsei Nakao (Japanese); Laurie Steele (English)
Alice is August and Eishia's grandmother, and a doctor who treats Rudo after he falls into the Pit. She is mistaken for an old man due to her appearance.
Remlin Tysark (レムリン・ティサーク, Remurin Tisāku)
Voiced by: Yūko Sanpei (Japanese); Trina Nishimura (English)
Remlin is a young, mischievous spellcaster who lives in Canvas Town, using the vital instrument Pen to draw various spells that can apply different effects to its targets.
Gnomulas Ridd (グノムラース・リド, Gnomuraasu Rido)
Voiced by: Yōji Ueda (Japanese); David Wilson-Brown (English)
Gnomulas is the stern and disciplined mayor of Canvas Town.
Mymo (マイモー, Maimo)
Voiced by: Nobuyuki Hiyama (Japanese); Mark Allen Jr. (English)
Mymo is a hyperactive and eccentric News Reporter on the Ground who has grandiose plans for the future. His vital instrument is Elenhos, a microphone with which he can manipulate people's minds and the essence of their soul.
Gil (ギル, Giru)
Gil is a short and easy-going mercenary hired by Mymo to help him in his plan. Her vital instrument is Gilmero, a baseball bat that can create a "breaking ball" out of any spherical object hit by it, which has enough force to break arms, and can track targets.
Felix (フェリックス, Ferikkusu)
Felix is a straight-laced and loyal follower of Mymo. His vital instrument is Carta, a letter holder containing written letters, which can form an unbreakable force field.
Kuro (クロ)
Kuro is a very long-lived and heavy-set and formal information broker who is said to have accumulated the greatest wealth of information. He also has an unspecified ability to completely change his form from human to crow.
Too Lily (トゥー・リリー, Tū Ririi)
Too Lily is a very famous and extravagant singer on the Ground. Her vital instrument is Lunavis, a staff with the appearance of a magic wand, which allows her to do things described as "Magic", such as spontaneously changing outfits, teleport people and objects or making inanimate objects move while the wand is active. However, it is stated that she will die if she uses Lunavis for harm.
Wing (ウィング, Wingu)
Wing is a highly energetic member of the Doll Festival staff.
Gountess Knock (ガウンテス・ノック, Gauntesu Nokku)
Gountess is a frail-looking young man that became extremely skinny as a result of the treatment he received from Mymo. His vital instrument is Connect, the necklace from the Watchman Series, with which he can imbue a random cord with his blood, create a choker, the main form of long-distance communication on the Ground.
Alan (アラン, Aran)
Alan is an ambitious and curious child who lives in the North Ward, the area of the Ground closest to the Sphere and subject to toxic winters. After wandering into a polluted area and being rescued by the Cleaners, Alan was encouraged to become a Giver. However, he gave up on his dream years later, allowing Follo to take his vital instrument.
Alto Surebrec (アルト・シュアブレック, Aruto Shuaburekku)
Alto is Rudo's biological father. He allegedly went on a killing spree on the Sphere and was thrown into the Pit. He also saved Enjin when he was younger, giving him his current alias, his Vital Instrument, and another secret weapon.
