= Ryan Colt Levy =

American voice actor (born 1987)

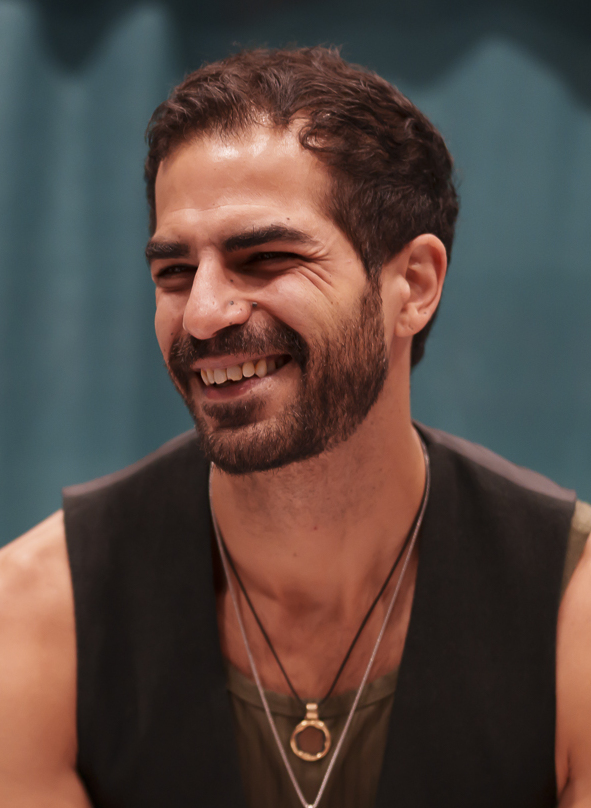
- Levy in 2025
- Born: February 12, 1987 (age 39); New York City, US
- Occupations: Voice actor, musician
- Years active: 2018–present
- Notable credits: Rody Soul in My Hero Academia: World Heroes' Mission; Yamato in Scar on the Praeter; Denji in Chainsaw Man

Ryan Colt Levy (born February 12, 1987) is an American voice actor and musician, known for his voice work in video games and English dubs of anime.

== Career ==
Despite initially wanting to pursue film and theater acting, Levy moved with his band to Los Angeles, California to pursue music.

He picked up improv and scene study classes, and began getting booked on commercials and small projects. Through industry circles, Levy found voice acting work and stated he "truly enjoyed it over the process of on-camera".

At the 8th Crunchyroll Anime Awards in 2024, Levy won the Best Voice Artist Performance (English) award for his role as Denji in Chainsaw Man.

== Works ==
=== Filmography ===
==== Animated series ====
Year	Title	Role	Notes	Ref
2019	Welcome to Demon School! Iruma-kun	Jazz M. Andro		
2020	JoJo's Bizarre Adventure: Golden Wind	Squalo		
2020	Yashahime	Yamata		
2021	The Saint's Magic Power is Omnipotent	Yuri Dreves		
2021	Record of Ragnarok	Loki, Kagehisa Ittosai Ito		
2021	Shaman King (2021)	Turbine		
2021	Moriarty the Patriot	John H. Watson		
2022	Komi Can't Communicate	Shisuto Naruse		
2022	Scar on the Praeter	Yamato Kai		
2022	Bastard!!	Macapine Toni Strauss		
2022	Love of Kill	Song Ryang-ha		
2022	The Prince of Tennis	Eishiro Kite		
2022	Kingdom	Qing, Wo Lu, Zhong Tie, Gao Mu	Season 3	
2022	Chainsaw Man	Denji		
2022	Fate/Grand Carnival	Cu Chulainn (Prototype), Arash		
2022	Romantic Killer	Makoto Oda, Ryuya		
2023	The Legend of Heroes: Trails of Cold Steel – Northern War	Ivano		
2023	Vinland Saga	Olmar	Netflix dub	
2023	My Happy Marriage	Arata Tsuruki, Kazushi Tatsuishi		
2023	Jujutsu Kaisen	Yu Haibara		
2023	My Love Story with Yamada-kun at Lv999	Takeaki Okamoto		
2023	Akuma-kun	Tatsuki Shiraishi, Nakayama		
2024	Solo Leveling	Eunseok		
2024	The Seven Deadly Sins: Four Knights of the Apocalypse	Donny		
2024	Tower of God	Edin Dan, Chang Blarode		
2024	The Elusive Samurai	Prince Moriyoshi		
2025	Mobile Suit Gundam GQuuuuuuX	Cameron Bloom		
2025	Moonrise	Phil Arche		
2025	Synduality: Noir	Black Mask / Mahato		
2025	Blue Box	Kazuma Matsuoka, Yamamoto, Yoshiki		
2025	Übel Blatt	Wied		
2025	Witch Watch	Hajime, Nemoto		
2025	City The Animation	Goro Kurobe		
2025	Digimon Ghost Game	Angoramon, SymbareAngoramon, Lamortmon		
2025	My Hero Academia	Rody Soul	Season 8	
2025	Digimon Beatbreak	Raito Souda		
2026	Baki-Dou: The Invincible Samurai	Takejo Miwa		
2026	The Ramparts of Ice	Tsubasa Igarashi		
2026	Dandelion (manga)	Shinji Kyoga		
2026	Black Torch	Ryosuke Shiba		
2026	Tougen Anki: Nikko Kegon Falls Arc	Shinichi Fuwa		

==== Film ====
Year	Title	Role	Notes	Ref
2021	My Hero Academia: World Heroes' Mission	Rody Soul		
2021	Fate/Grand Order The Movie Divine Realm of the Round Table: Camelot	Arash		
2023	Lupin the 3rd vs. Cat's Eye	Toshio Utsumi		
2024	Mononoke the Movie: Phantom in the Rain	Emperor Tenshi, Sudo		
2025	The Rose of Versailles	Hans Axel von Fersen		
2025	Chainsaw Man – The Movie: Reze Arc	Denji		

==== Video games ====
Year	Title	Role	Notes	Ref
2019	Mobile Legends: Bang Bang	Faramis		
2020	Genshin Impact	Pengyi, Yixuan, Slippery Wu, Daipai		
2021	Cookie Run: Kingdom	Burnt Cheese Cookie		
2021	Smash Legends	Snow		
2021	Shin Megami Tensei V	Khonsu		
2022	Fire Emblem Warriors: Three Hopes	Shahid		
2022	Azure Striker Gunvolt 3	Black Badge		
2022	Star Ocean: The Divine Force	Kassim Latif		
2023	Anonymous;Code	Ronin del Cielo		
2023	Like a Dragon Gaiden: The Man Who Erased His Name	Agent Raita		
2024	Shin Megami Tensei V: Vengeance	Khonsu		
2024	The Legend of Heroes: Trails Through Daybreak	Kasim Al-Fayed, Nate		
2024	Batman: Arkham Shadow	Whiting, Corti, Zentner		
2024	Romancing SaGa 2: Revenge of the Seven	Altan		
2024	Stranger Things VR	Billy Hargrove		
2025	Dynasty Warriors: Origins	Sun Ce		
2025	The Legend of Heroes: Trails through Daybreak II	Kasim Al-Fayed, Nate		
2025	Monster Hunter Wilds	Zatoh		
2025	Fantasy Life i: The Girl Who Steals Time	Avatar, Colin, Ian, Pino, Mr. Torgide		
2026	The Legend of Heroes: Trails Beyond the Horizon	Kasim Al-Fayed		
2026	Halloween: The Game	Eric Dunn		
2026	Fire Emblem: Fortune's Weave	Baozi		
2027	Romancing SaGa 3: Destinies United	Khalid		

=== Lyrics ===
- "O2", performed by Suho
- "Beautiful Night", performed by Yesung
