= Kikunosuke Toya =

Japanese voice actor

- 戸谷 菊之介
- Born: November 30, 1998 (age 27); Tokyo, Japan
- Occupation: Voice actor
- Years active: 2021–present
- Agent: Sony Music Artists
- Notable work: Chainsaw Man as Denji; UniteUp! as Akira Kiyose; The Fragrant Flower Blooms with Dignity as Shohei Usami; The Yuzuki Family's Four Sons as Mikoto Yuzuki; The Elusive Samurai as Fubuki
- Awards: Seiyu Award for Best New Actor Award (2024)

Japanese name
- Kanji: 戸谷 菊之介
- Kana: とや きくのすけ

Kikunosuke Toya (Japanese: 戸谷 菊之介, Hepburn: Toya Kikunosuke; born November 30, 1998) is a Japanese voice actor affiliated with Sony Music Artists. After spending some time doing comedy, drama, and piano as a high school student, he won the Special Award at Sony Music Artists' 6th Anistoteles' audition in 2017, and he made his debut in 2022 as Denji, the main character of the anime Chainsaw Man. He has starred as Akira Kiyose in Sony Music Entertainment Japan's UniteUp! project, Donny in Four Knights of the Apocalypse, Shohei Usami in The Fragrant Flower Blooms with Dignity, Mikoto Yuzuki in The Yuzuki Family's Four Sons, and Fubuki in The Elusive Samurai. In 2024, he won the Best New Actor Award at the 18th Seiyu Awards.

== Early life ==
Toya, born on November 30, 1998, is a native of Tokyo and of Kanagawa Prefecture. Toya has an older brother and older sister. As a young child, he lived for years in Thailand due to his parents' work. He began playing the piano at the age of three, and he was invited to accompany a chorus competition while in junior high school due to his skills and once unsuccessfully auditioned to play jazz piano for a school club. While in high school, he posted covers on YouTube and Nico Nico Douga, was the keyboardist of an all-male Princess Princess cover band, and was part of a volunteer comedy group who performed at school festivals and graduation parties.

== Career ==
After spending some time in a high school drama club, he was offered both a lead role and the opportunity to be screenwriter and director for a school festival class play. Auditioning for several comedians' offices and training schools, and going to acting workshops, he learned that he could make people laugh through acting, so he decided to pursue acting. In October 2017, when he was 18 years old, he won the Special Award at Sony Music Artists' 6th Anistoteles' audition; he had been inspired to participate by Inori Minase's win of the Anistoteles' Grand Prix. He subsequently decided on a career in voice acting. Afterwards, in 2019, he was part of the first graduating class of Megumi Ogata's private acting school Team BareboAt, which opened in the same year.

In October 2018, Toya was cast in DMM Games' Wind Boys! project. In 2019, he appeared in the music video for Owarikara's song "Fetish!". In 2022, he starred in his first main role as Denji in the anime Chainsaw Man, with Ogata herself giving him words of encouragement. In his Anime News Network review for "Rescue", the fourth episode of Chainsaw Man, James Beckett praised Toya's performance as Denji, saying that Toya "nail[ed] Denji's particular mix of ferocity, mania, and brazen idiocy".

He stars as Akira Kiyose in Sony Music Entertainment Japan's UniteUp! project, and in addition to reprising his role in the anime and being part of the tie-in trio unit Protostar, he sang the anime's theme song "Unite Up!" alongside the rest of the cast. He also starred as Donny in Four Knights of the Apocalypse, Mikoto Yuzuki in The Yuzuki Family's Four Sons, and Fubuki in The Elusive Samurai. In November 2023, he was a guest at the North American premiere of Four Knights of the Apocalypse at Anime NYC 2023.

In 2024, Toya was nominated in the Best Voice Artist Performance (Japanese) for his work as Denji at the 8th Crunchyroll Anime Awards, and won Best New Actor at the 18th Seiyu Awards. He stars as Minoru Kudou in the third season of The Irregular at Magic High School and Hadis Teos Rave in The Do-Over Damsel Conquers the Dragon Emperor.

== Filmography ==
=== Animated series ===
Year	Title	Role	Ref.
2022	Chainsaw Man	Denji	
2022	Heroines Run the Show	Miyazawa	
2022	Tokyo 24th Ward	Demonstrator	
2023	UniteUp!	Akira Kiyose	
2023	My Daughter Left the Nest and Returned an S-Rank Adventurer	Ashcroft	
2023	Four Knights of the Apocalypse	Donny	
2023	The Yuzuki Family's Four Sons	Mikoto Yuzuki	
2024	The Irregular at Magic High School	Minoru Kudou	
2024	Wind Breaker	Chōji Tomiyama	
2024	The Elusive Samurai	Fubuki	
2024	Black Butler	Cheslock	
2024	Blue Miburo	Tōdō Heisuke	
2024	The Do-Over Damsel Conquers the Dragon Emperor	Hadis Teos Rave	
2025	Even Given the Worthless "Appraiser" Class, I'm Actually the Strongest	Ein	
2025	Can a Boy-Girl Friendship Survive?	Yū Natsume	
2025	The Fragrant Flower Blooms with Dignity	Shōhei Usami	
2025	With You and the Rain	Teru	
2026	Hana-Kimi	Shūichi Nakatsu	
2026	High School! Kimengumi	Dai Monohoshi	
2026	Dark Moon: The Blood Altar	Heli	
2026	Patlabor EZY	Kippei Atori	
2026	Iron Wok Jan	Jan Akiyama	
2026	The Insipid Prince's Furtive Grab for the Throne	Leonard Lakes Adler	
2026	Liar Game	Makoto Murata	
2026	A Tale of the Secret Saint	Curtis Bannister	
2026	So What's Wrong with Getting Reborn as a Goblin?	Akira	
2027	Bride of the Barrier Master	Saku Ichinomiya	
2027	Sakamoto Days	Amane Yotsumura	

=== Animated films ===
Year	Title	Role	Ref.
2025	Chainsaw Man – The Movie: Reze Arc	Denji	
2026	Mobile Suit Gundam: Hathaway – The Sorcery of Nymph Circe	Chang Hei	

=== Video games ===
Year	Title	Role	Ref.
2021	Binding Boyfriend	Shindo Aki	
2021	Wind Boys!	Osei Kiyoshima	
2023	One: Kagayaku Kisetsu e	Mamoru Sumii	
2023	Shadowverse	Bolt Demon, sealing magician, creator of secret medicine	
2024	That Time I Got Reincarnated as a Slime: ISEKAI Chronicles	Rito Hotokawa	

=== Dubbing ===
==== Live-action ====
- Jurassic World (2025 The Cinema edition) (Zach Mitchell (Nick Robinson))

==== Animation ====
- Teenage Mutant Ninja Turtles: Mutant Mayhem (Michelangelo)

== Accolades ==
Year	Award	Category	Recipient	Result	Ref.
2024	8th Crunchyroll Anime Awards	Best Voice Artist Performance (Japanese)	Denji (Chainsaw Man)	Nominated	
2024	18th Seiyu Awards	Seiyu Award for Best New Actor	Himself	Won	
2026	20th Seiyu Awards	Seiyu Award for Best Lead Actor	Himself	Won	
2026	10th Crunchyroll Anime Awards	Best Voice Artist Performance (Japanese)	Denji (Chainsaw Man – The Movie: Reze Arc)	Nominated	
