= Hiroki Totoki =

Japanese businessman (born 1964)

- 十時 裕樹
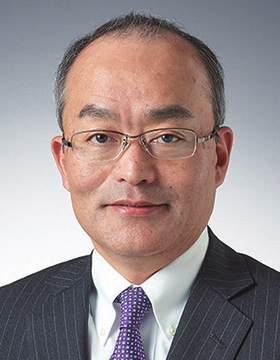
- Hiroki Totoki in 2016
- Born: July 17, 1964 (age 62); Yamaguchi Prefecture
- Occupation: Businessman
- Years active: 1987-present
- Title: President and CEO, Sony Group Corporation
- Term: 2023–present

Hiroki Totoki (十時 裕樹; born July 17, 1964) is a Japanese businessman. He is currently the president and CEO of Sony Group Corporation, chairman of Sony Interactive Entertainment, and co-founder of Sony Bank Inc. He is originally from Yamaguchi Prefecture.

Totoki has built an extensive career spanning over three decades within Sony Group Corporation. His long tenure culminated in his appointment as president and chief executive officer (CEO) of Sony Group Corporation, effective April 1, 2025. Throughout his career, Totoki has played a significant role in shaping Sony's direction, particularly its pivot towards entertainment businesses, including gaming, music, film, and television.

Hiroki Totoki joined Sony in 1987 and became CEO in 2025, openly proposed by the outgoing CEO Kenichiro Yoshida and unanimously endorsed by the board of directors.

== Early career ==
After graduating from Yamaguchi Prefectural Yamaguchi High School and the School of Commerce at Waseda University, he joined Sony (now the Sony Group) in 1987. In 2001, he founded Sony Bank with Shigeru Ishii. In 2005, he became senior managing director of Sony Communication Network (now Sony Network Communications). After serving as executive vice president, he became an executive officer of Sony (now the Sony Group) in 2013.

In 2014, he was transferred to group executive officer and was simultaneously appointed president and CEO of Sony Mobile Communications. He was subsequently appointed Sony executive officer and CSO in 2017, senior managing director and CFO in 2018, and executive vice president and CFO in 2020, before being promoted to president, COO and CFO on April 1, 2023. On April 1, 2025, he became representative director, president and CEO, succeeding Kenichiro Yoshida.

== Current position ==
- Director, president and CEO, Sony Group Corporation.
- Non-executive director of Sony Corporation.
- Non-executive director, Sony Financial Holdings Inc.
- Non-executive director, Sony Semiconductor Solutions Corporation.
- Non-executive director, Sony Music Entertainment Inc.
- Outside director of Recruit Holdings Co., Ltd.
