= 8th Crunchyroll Anime Awards =

2024 award ceremony

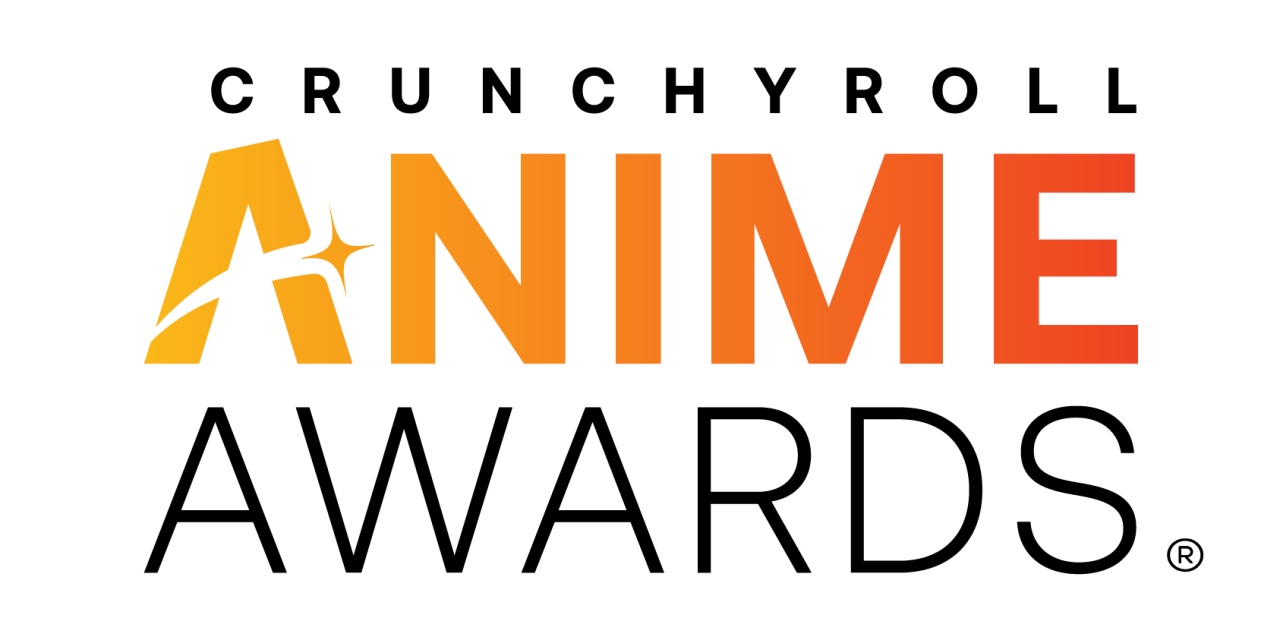
- Awarded for: Excellence in anime
- Date: March 2, 2024
- Location: Grand Prince Hotel New Takanawa, Tokyo, Japan
- Country: United States
- Hosted by: Sally Amaki; Jon Kabira

Highlights
- Most wins: Jujutsu Kaisen (11)
- Most nominations: Chainsaw Man (25)
- Anime of the Year: Jujutsu Kaisen
- Best Film: Suzume
- Website: Crunchyroll Anime Awards

The 8th Crunchyroll Anime Awards were held at the Main Banquet Hall of the Grand Prince Hotel New Takanawa in Tokyo, Japan. This edition featured 32 categories honoring anime released from October 2022 to September 2023. The ceremony was streamed live by Crunchyroll on YouTube and Twitch. Sally Amaki and Jon Kabira hosted the ceremony for the second time, after doing so in the previous ceremony. Crunchyroll reported that 34 million votes from "nearly 200 countries and regions" were submitted, an increase from last year's 18 million votes.

== Winners and nominees ==
Chainsaw Man received the most nominations with a record 25, followed by Jujutsu Kaisen at 17, and Oshi no Ko and Demon Slayer: Kimetsu no Yaiba at 12. The Anime of the Year contenders include previous winners Jujutsu Kaisen, Attack on Titan, and Demon Slayer: Kimetsu no Yaiba. MAPPA is the most represented animation studio, with five series nominated in various categories, including a record three series for the top prize. One Piece was nominated again for Best Continuing Series after it won the award previously, along with Attack on Titan and Demon Slayer: Kimetsu no Yaiba. Birdie Wing: Golf Girls' Story was nominated again for Best Original Anime, while Best Animation saw previous contenders and winners Attack on Titan, Demon Slayer: Kimetsu no Yaiba, Jujutsu Kaisen, and Mob Psycho 100. Akira Matsushima received a nomination for Best Character Design for Demon Slayer: Kimetsu no Yaiba again, after winning it in the last edition. Yuichiro Hayashi was nominated again for Best Director for his work on Attack on Titan. Hiroyuki Sawano and Kohta Yamamoto was nominated again for Best Score, along with Yuki Kajiura and Go Shiina for Demon Slayer: Kimetsu no Yaiba. Atsumi Tanezaki and Yuki Kaji were nominated again for Best VA Performance (Japanese) for Anya Forger and Eren Jaeger respectively.

Among genre categories, Spy × Family was nominated again for Best Comedy, and Attack on Titan, Jujutsu Kaisen, and Demon Slayer: Kimetsu no Yaiba for Best Action. Demon Slayer: Kimetsu no Yaiba was also nominated again for Best Fantasy, along with Mushoku Tensei: Jobless Reincarnation and Ranking of Kings. Attack on Titan was nominated again as well for Best Drama. For character categories, Eren Jaeger and Shigeo "Mob" Kageyama were nominated for Best Main Character again, while Hitori "Bocchi" Gotoh was nominated for both Best Main Character and "Must Protect at All Costs" Character. Two characters from Jujutsu Kaisen, Satoru Gojo and Suguru Geto, was nominated for Best Supporting Character, while Anya Forger of Spy × Family and Bojji of Ranking of Kings were nominated again for "Must Protect at All Costs" Character. Four anime songs nominated for Best Anime Song were nominated for Best Opening Sequence as well: "Idol" by Yoasobi, "Kick Back" by Kenshi Yonezu, "Where Our Blue Is" by Tatsuya Kitani, and "Work" by Ringo Sheena and Millennium Parade. Both the opening and ending themes for Oshi no Ko, Jujutsu Kaisen, Chainsaw Man, and Zom 100: Bucket List of the Dead were nominated in their respective categories.

=== Awards ===
The second season of Jujutsu Kaisen won 11 awards, including Anime of the Year, which previously won in 2020, becoming the first anime to win multiple top prizes. The season also surpassed the second season of My Hero Academia (eight from the second edition in 2018) as the most awarded anime in awards history. Its director, Shōta Goshozono, won Best Director. Additionally, the series won the inaugural award for Best Cinematography. Suzume won Best Film; the award was received by its director Makoto Shinkai. One Piece and Demon Slayer: Kimetsu no Yaiba won again the awards for Best Continuing Series and Best Animation respectively. Demon Slayer: Kimetsu no Yaiba also won the inaugural award for Best Art Direction. Chainsaw Man won Best New Series, while Buddy Daddies won Best Original Anime. Jujutsu Kaisen, Demon Slayer: Kimetsu no Yaiba, Horimiya: The Missing Pieces, Spy × Family, Bocchi the Rock!, and Attack on Titan won the genre awards for Best Action, Best Fantasy, Best Romance, Best Comedy, Best Slice of Life, and Best Drama respectively.

Monkey D. Luffy of One Piece won Best Main Character, while Satoru Gojo of Jujutsu Kaisen won Best Supporting Character. Anya Forger won the "Must Protect at All Costs" Character award again. Meanwhile, both the opening and ending sequences of Jujutsu Kaisen, "Where Our Blue Is" by Tatsuya Kitani and "Akari" by Soushi Sakiyama, won the awards for Best Opening Sequence and Best Ending Sequence respectively. "Idol" by Yoasobi won Best Anime Song while Kohta Yamamoto and Hiroyuki Sawano won Best Score for their work on the first special in the final season of Attack on Titan. Yuichi Nakamura won Best Voice Acting (Japanese) for his work as Satoru Gojo in Jujutsu Kaisen, while Ryan Colt Levy won Best Voice Acting (English) for his work as Denji in Chainsaw Man.

Winners are listed first, highlighted in boldface, and indicated with a double dagger (‡). The lists are arranged alphabetically, except for the winner.

**Anime of the Year**: **Jujutsu Kaisen (season 2) — MAPPA**‡; Bocchi the Rock! — CloverWorks; Chainsaw Man — MAPPA; Demon Slayer: Kimetsu no Yaiba Swordsmith Village Arc — Ufotable; Oshi no Ko — Doga Kobo; Vinland Saga (season 2) — MAPPA	**Best Film**: **Suzume — CoMix Wave Films**‡; Black Clover: Sword of the Wizard King — Pierrot; Blue Giant — NUT; The First Slam Dunk — Toei Animation and DandeLion Animation Studio; Kaguya-sama: Love Is War – The First Kiss That Never Ends — A-1 Pictures; Psycho-Pass Providence — Production I.G
**Best Continuing Series**: **One Piece — Toei Animation**‡; Attack on Titan: The Final Season The Final Chapters Special 1 — MAPPA; Demon Slayer: Kimetsu no Yaiba Swordsmith Village Arc — Ufotable; Jujutsu Kaisen (season 2) — MAPPA; Spy × Family (season 1 cour 2) — Wit Studio and CloverWorks; Vinland Saga (season 2) — MAPPA	**Best New Series**: **Chainsaw Man — MAPPA**‡; Bocchi the Rock! — CloverWorks; Heavenly Delusion — Production I.G; Hell's Paradise — MAPPA; Oshi no Ko — Doga Kobo; Zom 100: Bucket List of the Dead — Bug Films
**Best Original Anime**: **Buddy Daddies — P.A. Works**‡; Akiba Maid War — P.A. Works; Birdie Wing: Golf Girls' Story (season 2) — Bandai Namco Pictures; Do It Yourself!! — Pine Jam; The Marginal Service — Studio 3Hz; Mobile Suit Gundam: The Witch from Mercury — Sunrise	**Best Animation**: **Demon Slayer: Kimetsu no Yaiba Swordsmith Village Arc — Ufotable**‡; Attack on Titan: The Final Season The Final Chapters Special 1 — MAPPA; Chainsaw Man — MAPPA; Jujutsu Kaisen (season 2) — MAPPA; Mob Psycho 100 III (season 3) — Bones; Trigun Stampede — Orange
**Best Character Design**: **Sayaka Koiso and Tadashi Hiramatsu, original designs by Gege Akutami — Jujutsu Kaisen (season 2)**‡; Akira Matsushima, original designs by Koyoharu Gotouge — Demon Slayer: Kimetsu no Yaiba Swordsmith Village Arc; Kanna Hirayama, original designs by Mengo Yokoyari — Oshi no Ko; Kazutaka Sugiyama, original designs by Tatsuki Fujimoto — Chainsaw Man; Kouji Hisaki, original designs by Yuji Kaku — Hell's Paradise; Kouji Tajima — Trigun Stampede	**Best Director**: **Shōta Goshozono — Jujutsu Kaisen (season 2)**‡; Daisuke Hiramaki — Oshi no Ko; Hirotaka Mori — Heavenly Delusion; Keiichirō Saitō — Bocchi the Rock!; Ryu Nakayama — Chainsaw Man; Yuichiro Hayashi — Attack on Titan: The Final Season The Final Chapters Special 1
**Best Cinematography**: **Teppei Ito — Jujutsu Kaisen (season 2)**‡; Hisashi Matsumuko and Yuki Kawashita — Vinland Saga (season 2); Kentaro Waki — Heavenly Delusion; Shigeki Asakawa — Attack on Titan: The Final Season The Final Chapters Special 1; Teppei Ito — Chainsaw Man; Yuichi Terao — Demon Slayer: Kimetsu no Yaiba Swordsmith Village Arc	**Best Art Direction**: **Koji Eto — Demon Slayer: Kimetsu no Yaiba Swordsmith Village Arc**‡; e-caesar — Hell's Paradise; Junichi Higashi — Jujutsu Kaisen (season 2); Taketo Gonpei — Zom 100: Bucket List of the Dead; Tetsuya Usami — Oshi no Ko; Yusuke Takeda — Chainsaw Man
**Best Action**: **Jujutsu Kaisen (season 2) — MAPPA**‡; Attack on Titan: The Final Season The Final Chapters Special 1 — MAPPA; Bleach: Thousand-Year Blood War — The Separation — Pierrot; Chainsaw Man — MAPPA; Demon Slayer: Kimetsu no Yaiba Swordsmith Village Arc — Ufotable; One Piece — Toei Animation	**Best Comedy**: **Spy × Family (season 1 cour 2) — Wit Studio and CloverWorks**‡; Bocchi the Rock! — CloverWorks; Buddy Daddies — P.A. Works; Mashle: Magic and Muscles — A-1 Pictures; Urusei Yatsura — David Production; Zom 100: Bucket List of the Dead — Bug Films
**Best Drama**: **Attack on Titan: The Final Season The Final Chapters Special 1 — MAPPA**‡; Heavenly Delusion — Production I.G; My Happy Marriage — Kinema Citrus; Oshi no Ko — Doga Kobo; To Your Eternity (season 2) — Drive; Vinland Saga (season 2) — MAPPA	**Best Fantasy**: **Demon Slayer: Kimetsu no Yaiba Swordsmith Village Arc — Ufotable**‡; Hell's Paradise — MAPPA; Mashle: Magic and Muscles — A-1 Pictures; Mushoku Tensei: Jobless Reincarnation (season 2) — Studio Bind; Ranking of Kings: The Treasure Chest of Courage — Wit Studio; The Ancient Magus' Bride (season 2) — Studio Kafka
**Best Romance**: **Horimiya: The Missing Pieces — CloverWorks**‡; Insomniacs After School — Liden Films; My Happy Marriage — Kinema Citrus; My Love Story with Yamada-kun at Lv999 — Madhouse; Skip and Loafer — P.A. Works; Tomo-chan Is a Girl! — Lay-duce	**Best Slice of Life**: **Bocchi the Rock! — CloverWorks**‡; Do It Yourself!! — Pine Jam; Horimiya: The Missing Pieces — CloverWorks; Insomniacs After School — Liden Films; My Love Story with Yamada-kun at Lv999 — Madhouse; Skip and Loafer — P.A. Works
**Best Main Character**: **Monkey D. Luffy — One Piece**‡; Denji — Chainsaw Man; Eren Jaeger — Attack on Titan: The Final Season The Final Chapters Special 1; Hitori "Bocchi" Gotoh — Bocchi the Rock!; Shigeo "Mob" Kageyama — Mob Psycho 100 III (season 3); Thorfinn — Vinland Saga (season 2)	**Best Supporting Character**: **Satoru Gojo — Jujutsu Kaisen (season 2)**‡; Arataka Reigen — Mob Psycho 100 III (season 3); Zoë Hange — Attack on Titan: The Final Season The Final Chapters Special 1; Kana Arima — Oshi no Ko; Power — Chainsaw Man; Suguru Geto — Jujutsu Kaisen (season 2)
**"Must Protect at All Costs" Character**: **Anya Forger — Spy × Family (season 1 cour 2)**‡; Bojji — Ranking of Kings: The Treasure Chest of Courage; Hitori "Bocchi" Gotoh — Bocchi the Rock!; Miri Unasaka — Buddy Daddies; Pochita — Chainsaw Man; Suletta Mercury — Mobile Suit Gundam: The Witch from Mercury	**Best Anime Song**: **"Idol" by Yoasobi — Oshi no Ko**‡; "Kick Back" by Kenshi Yonezu — Chainsaw Man; "Seishun Complex" by Kessoku Band — Bocchi the Rock!; "Suzume" by Radwimps feat. Toaka — Suzume; "Where Our Blue Is" by Tatsuya Kitani — Jujutsu Kaisen (season 2); "Work" by Ringo Sheena and Millenium Parade — Hell's Paradise
**Best Score**: **Hiroyuki Sawano and Kohta Yamamoto — Attack on Titan: The Final Season The Final Chapters Special 1**‡; Kensuke Ushio — Chainsaw Man; Radwimps and Kazuma Jinnouchi — Suzume; Takuro Iga — Oshi no Ko; Tomoki Kikuya — Bocchi the Rock!; Yuki Kajiura and Go Shiina — Demon Slayer: Kimetsu no Yaiba Swordsmith Village Arc	**Best Opening Sequence**: **"Where Our Blue Is" by Tatsuya Kitani, storyboard and direction by Yuki Kamiya — Jujutsu Kaisen (season 2)**‡; "Idol" by Yoasobi, storyboard and direction by Yusuke Yamamoto — Oshi no Ko; "Innocent Arrogance" by Bish, storyboard and direction by Weilin Zhang — Heavenly Delusion; "Kick Back" by Kenshi Yonezu, storyboard and direction by Shingo Yamashita — Chainsaw Man; "Song of the Dead" by Kana-Boon, storyboard and direction by Kazuki Kawagoe — Zom 100: Bucket List of the Dead; "Work" by Ringo Sheena and Millennium Parade, storyboard and direction by Kamata — Hell's Paradise
**Best Ending Sequence**: **"Akari" by Soushi Sakiyama, storyboard and direction by Yojiro Arai — Jujutsu Kaisen (season 2)**‡; "Color" by Yama, storyboard and direction by Takayuki Hirao — Spy × Family (season 1 cour 2); "Happiness of the Dead" by Shiyui, storyboard and direction by Hanako Ueda — Zom 100: Bucket List of the Dead; "Hawatari Nioku Centi" by Maximum the Hormone, storyboard and direction by Yuki Kamiya — Chainsaw Man; "Koi Kogare" by Milet and Man with a Mission, storyboard and direction by Yuki Shimizu — Demon Slayer: Kimetsu no Yaiba Swordsmith Village Arc; "Mephisto" by Queen Bee, storyboard and direction by Naoya Nakayama — Oshi no Ko	**Best VA Performance (Japanese)**: **Yuichi Nakamura as Satoru Gojo — Jujutsu Kaisen (season 2)**‡; Atsumi Tanezaki as Anya Forger — Spy × Family (season 1 cour 2); Kikunosuke Toya as Denji — Chainsaw Man; Mayumi Tanaka as Monkey D. Luffy — One Piece; Yoshino Aoyama as Hitori "Bocchi" Gotoh — Bocchi the Rock!; Yuki Kaji as Eren Jaeger — Attack on Titan: The Final Season The Final Chapters Special 1
**Best VA Performance (English)**: **Ryan Colt Levy as Denji — Chainsaw Man**‡; Abby Trott as Nezuko Kamado — Demon Slayer: Kimetsu no Yaiba Swordsmith Village Arc; Austin Tindle as Millions Knives — Trigun Stampede; Johnny Yong Bosch as Ichigo Kurosaki — Bleach: Thousand-Year Blood War; Lexi Nieto as Tomo Aizawa — Tomo-chan Is a Girl!; Marisa Duran as Sagiri Yamada Asaemon — Hell's Paradise	**Best VA Performance (Spanish)**: **Emilio Treviño as Denji — Chainsaw Man**‡; Armando Corona Ibarrola as Muichiro Tokito — Demon Slayer: Kimetsu no Yaiba Swordsmith Village Arc; Gerardo Ortega as Mash Burnedead — Mashle: Magic and Muscles; José Gilberto Vilchis as Satoru Gojo — Jujutsu Kaisen (season 2); Manuel Campuzano as Arataka Reigen — Mob Psycho 100 III (season 3); Nycolle González as Suzume Iwato — Suzume
**Best VA Performance (Castilian)**: **Joel Gómez Jimenez as Denji — Chainsaw Man**‡; David Brau as Senku Ishigami — Dr. Stone: New World (season 3); David Flores as Dot Barrett — Mashle: Magic and Muscles; Majo Montesinos Guzmán as Anya Forger — Spy × Family (season 1 cour 2); María Luisa Marciel as Power — Chainsaw Man; Marta Moreno as Uta — One Piece Film: Red	**Best VA Performance (French)**: **Martial Le Minoux as Suguru Geto — Jujutsu Kaisen (season 2)**‡; Levanah Solomon as Suzume Iwato — Suzume; Lilly Caruso as Aqua — KonoSuba: God's Blessing on This Wonderful World!; Martin Faliu as Aqua — Oshi no Ko; Yoan Sover as Gabimaru — Hell's Paradise; Zina Khakhoulia as Power — Chainsaw Man
**Best VA Performance (Arabic)**: **Taleb Alrefai as Senku Ishigami — Dr. Stone (season 1)**‡; Basil Alrefai as Vegeta — Dragon Ball Super; Hiba Snobar as Anya Forger — Spy × Family (season 1 cour 1); Mohammad Dal'o as Arataka Reigen — Mob Psycho 100; Ra'fat Bazo as Son Goku — Dragon Ball Super; Rosie Yaziji as Rimuru Tempest — That Time I Got Reincarnated as a Slime (season 1)	**Best VA Performance (German)**: **Franziska Trunte as Power — Chainsaw Man**‡; Emilia Raschewski as Suzume Iwato — Suzume; Franciska Friede as Chise Hatori — The Ancient Magus' Bride; Pascal Breuer as Arataka Reigen — Mob Psycho 100 III (season 3); Patrick Baehr as Gen Asagiri — Dr. Stone: New World (season 3); Patrick Keller as Akira Tendo — Zom 100: Bucket List of the Dead
**Best VA Performance (Italian)**: **Mosè Singh as Denji — Chainsaw Man**‡; Alessio De Filippis as Kirito — Sword Art Online Progressive: Scherzo of Deep Night; Benedetta Ponticelli as Makima — Chainsaw Man; Diego Baldoin as Takenori Akagi — The First Slam Dunk; Federica Simonelli as Uta — One Piece Film: Red; Max Di Benedetto as Boxxo — Reborn as a Vending Machine, I Now Wander the Dungeon	**Best VA Performance (Portuguese)**: **Léo Rabelo as Satoru Gojo — Jujutsu Kaisen (season 2)**‡; Amanda Brigido as Tomo Aizawa — Tomo-chan Is a Girl!; Erick Bougleux as Kazuma — KonoSuba: God's Blessing on This Wonderful World! Legend of Crimson; Guilherme Briggs as Brook — One Piece; Luisa Viotti as Makima — Chainsaw Man; Vágner Fagundes as Arataka Reigen — Mob Psycho 100 III (season 3)

=== Anime with multiple nominations and awards ===
Anime with multiple nominations (Note: Includes nominations for multiple seasons as well as related films, if any.)
Nominations	Anime
25	Chainsaw Man
17	Jujutsu Kaisen
12	Demon Slayer: Kimetsu no Yaiba
12	Oshi no Ko
10	Attack on Titan
10	Bocchi the Rock!
8	Hell's Paradise
7	Mob Psycho 100
7	One Piece (Note: Also including One Piece Film: Red)
7	Spy × Family
6	Suzume
6	Zom 100: Bucket List of the Dead
5	Heavenly Delusion
5	Vinland Saga
4	Mashle: Magic and Muscles
3	Buddy Daddies
3	Dr. Stone
3	Tomo-chan Is a Girl!
3	Trigun Stampede
2	The Ancient Magus' Bride
2	Bleach: Thousand-Year Blood War
2	Do It Yourself!!
2	Dragon Ball Super
2	The First Slam Dunk
2	Horimiya
2	Insomniacs After School
2	KonoSuba: God's Blessing on This Wonderful World! (Note: Also including KonoSuba: God's Blessing on This Wonderful World! Legend of Crimson film)
2	Mobile Suit Gundam: The Witch from Mercury
2	My Happy Marriage
2	My Love Story with Yamada-kun at Lv999
2	Ranking of Kings
2	Skip and Loafer

Anime with multiple wins
Wins	Anime
11	Jujutsu Kaisen
6	Chainsaw Man
3	Demon Slayer: Kimetsu no Yaiba
2	Attack on Titan
2	One Piece
2	Spy × Family

=== Studios with multiple nominations and awards ===
Studios with multiple nominations
Nominations	Studios	Anime(s)
65	MAPPA	Chainsaw Man, Jujutsu Kaisen, Attack on Titan, Hell's Paradise, and Vinland Saga
19	CloverWorks	Bocchi the Rock!, Spy × Family, and Horimiya
12	Ufotable	Demon Slayer: Kimetsu no Yaiba
12	Doga Kobo	Oshi no Ko
11	Toei Animation	One Piece, Dragon Ball Super, and The First Slam Dunk
9	Wit Studio	Spy × Family and Ranking of Kings
7	Bones	Mob Psycho 100
6	Bug Films	Zom 100: Bucket List of the Dead
6	CoMix Wave Films	Suzume
6	Production I.G	Heavenly Delusion and Psycho-Pass Providence
5	A-1 Pictures	Mashle: Magic and Muscles and Kaguya-sama: Love Is War – The First Kiss That Never Ends
5	P.A. Works	Buddy Daddies and Skip and Loafer
3	Lay-duce	Tomo-chan Is a Girl!
3	Orange	Trigun Stampede
3	Pierrot	Bleach: Thousand-Year Blood War and Black Clover: Sword of the Wizard King
3	TMS Entertainment	Dr. Stone
2	Kinema Citrus	My Happy Marriage
2	Liden Films	Insomniacs After School
2	Madhouse	My Love Story with Yamada-kun at Lv999
2	Pine Jam	Do It Yourself!!
2	Studio Kafka	The Ancient Magus' Bride
2	Sunrise	Mobile Suit Gundam: The Witch from Mercury

Studios with multiple wins
Wins	Studios	Anime(s)
19	MAPPA	Jujutsu Kaisen, Chainsaw Man, and Attack on Titan
4	CloverWorks	Spy × Family, Bocchi the Rock!, and Horimiya
3	Ufotable	Demon Slayer: Kimetsu no Yaiba
2	Toei Animation	One Piece

== Presenters and performers ==
The following individuals, listed in order of appearance, presented awards or a short monologue:

Presenters
Names	Role
Vinnie Hacker	Presented the award for Best Action
Ylona Garcia	Presented the awards for "Must Protect at All Costs" Character and Best Cinematography
Yaeji	Presented the award for Best New Series
Aquaria	Presented the awards for Best Drama and Best Comedy
Nava Rose	Presented the award for Best Fantasy
Che Lingo	Presented the award for Best Ending Sequence
Emiru	Presented the award for Best Main Character
Lena Lemon; Mikey McNamara	Presented the award for Best Supporting Character
Porter Robinson	Presented the award for Best Opening Sequence
LiSA	Presented the award for Best Original Anime
Iman Vellani	Presented the award for Best Character Design
Phil Lord and Christopher Miller; Joaquim Dos Santos	Presented the award for Best Animation
Sō Takei	Presented the award for Best Continuing Series
Rashmika Mandanna	Presented the award for Best Art Direction
Roland	Presented the award for Best Romance
Mercedes Varnado; DeMarcus Lawrence	Presented the award for Best Slice of Life
Shing02	Presented the award for Best Score
Liza Soberano	Presented the award for Best Anime Song
Chiaki Kuriyama	Presented the award for Best Film
Bong Joon Ho	Presented the award for Best Director
Megan Thee Stallion	Presented the award for Anime of the Year

The following individuals, listed in order of appearance, performed musical numbers:

Performers
Names	Role	Work
Hiroyuki Sawano; Kohta Yamamoto	Performers	Composing the 2024 Anime Awards theme song
Ryōsuke Shigenaga	Musical arranger and conductor	Conducted orchestra to commemorate the following works: 50th anniversary of Space Battleship Yamato; 45th anniversary of Mobile Suit Gundam; 40th anniversary of Dragon Ball franchise 25th anniversary of One Piece; 20th anniversary of Fullmetal Alchemist
Shing02; OMA; Spin Master A-1	Performers	"Battlecry" to commemorate the 20th anniversary of Samurai Champloo
Yoasobi	Performers	"Idol" from Oshi no Ko

== Ceremony information ==
This edition featured 32 categories, most of which are presented in the previous ceremony and include industry awards for Best Cinematography and Art Direction for the first time, as well as the return of Best Slice of Life since 2018. Categories and the list of judges were revealed on December 5. Nominees were revealed on the first day of public voting, January 17. Voting closed on January 27. Presenters for the ceremony on March 2 included American rapper Megan Thee Stallion, Canadian actress Iman Vellani, Japanese singer LiSA, and Filipino actress Liza Soberano, with Sony Group Corporation CEO Kenichiro Yoshida giving opening remarks.

=== Controversies ===
The second season of Jujutsu Kaisen winning 11 awards including Anime of the Year sparked a debate among critics and fans. In a reflection piece after this year's edition, Animehunch opined that due to its design, the awards favor popularity over merit, noting that the second season of Vinland Saga was a far better recipient of Anime of the Year than the second season of Jujutsu Kaisen. The website also argued that other deserved titles like Zom 100: Bucket List of the Dead and Heavenly Delusion should have won an award despite being nominated in multiple categories. Comic Book Resources felt that Vinland Saga and Heavenly Delusion have been "overlooked" as in the latter's case, its production values and storyline were just as good if not better than Jujutsu Kaisen. They also noting the Vinland Saga fans through X account were expressed frustration and dismay on behalf of the series.

The lack of diversity in the nominations was also criticized: 29 of the 32 award winners were adaptations of manga published in Weekly Shōnen Jump; of the nine voice acting categories, four went to voice actors who voiced Denji from Chainsaw Man, while only one female voice actress won an award for voice acting Power from the same series. Anime News Network editors Steve Jones and Nicholas Dupree concluded that the Crunchyroll Anime Awards were for production committee administrators who collect the revenue from the franchises, rather than animators and translators. In this context, the award for the second season of Jujutsu Kaisen was viewed critically in various categories, as the animation studio had been criticized in the past for its poor working conditions.
