= Crunchyroll Anime Award for Best Continuing Series =

- Awarded for: Best ongoing anime series of the previous year
- Country: United States; Japan
- First award: Shaft – March Comes In like a Lion (2018)
- Currently held by: Toei Animation – One Piece (2026)

Highlights
- Most wins: Studio: Toei Animation (4); Anime: One Piece (3)
- Most nominations: Studio: Toei Animation (7); Anime: One Piece (5)
- Website: Crunchyroll Anime Awards

The Crunchyroll Anime Award for Best Continuing Series is a series award given at the Crunchyroll Anime Awards since its second edition in 2018. It is given for the best ongoing anime series from the previous year. Winners are determined through a combined voting process by judges and public voting.

Coming-of-age romantic anime March Comes In like a Lion by Shaft first won the award in 2017. Toei Animation's flagship series One Piece won the award in 2023 and 2024, making both the first anime studio and series to win the award multiple times, consecutively. Toei Animation also received the most wins (4) and nominations (7) for an anime studio, along with One Piece also received the most.

In the latest edition in 2026, One Piece by Toei Animation won the award for the third time.

== Winners and nominees ==
In the following list, the first titles listed in gold are the winners; those not in gold are nominees, which are listed in alphabetical order. The years given are those in which the ceremonies took place.

=== 2010s ===
Year	Anime	Studio(s)
2017 (2nd)
2017 (2nd)	March Comes In like a Lion	Shaft
2017 (2nd)	All Out!!	Madhouse/TMS Entertainment
2017 (2nd)	Case Closed	TMS Entertainment
2017 (2nd)	Dragon Ball Super	Toei Animation
2017 (2nd)	Mobile Suit Gundam: Iron-Blooded Orphans	Sunrise
2017 (2nd)	Naruto: Shippuden	Pierrot
2018 (3rd)
2018 (3rd)	Dragon Ball Super	Toei Animation
2018 (3rd)	The Ancient Magus' Bride	Wit Studio
2018 (3rd)	Black Clover	Pierrot
2018 (3rd)	Boruto: Naruto Next Generations	Pierrot
2018 (3rd)	March Comes In like a Lion	Shaft
2018 (3rd)	One Piece	Toei Animation

=== 2020s ===
Year	Anime	Studio(s)
2021/2022 (7th)
2021/2022 (7th)	One Piece	Toei Animation
2021/2022 (7th)	Attack on Titan: The Final Season Part 2 (season 4 cour 2)	MAPPA
2021/2022 (7th)	Demon Slayer: Kimetsu no Yaiba Entertainment District Arc (season 2)	Ufotable
2021/2022 (7th)	JoJo's Bizarre Adventure: Stone Ocean (season 5)	David Production
2021/2022 (7th)	Kaguya-sama: Love Is War – Ultra Romantic (season 3)	A-1 Pictures
2021/2022 (7th)	Made in Abyss: The Golden City of the Scorching Sun (season 2)	Kinema Citrus
2022/2023 (8th)
2022/2023 (8th)	One Piece	Toei Animation
2022/2023 (8th)	Attack on Titan: The Final Season The Final Chapters Special 1 (season 4 cour 3)	MAPPA
2022/2023 (8th)	Demon Slayer: Kimetsu no Yaiba Swordsmith Village Arc (season 3)	Ufotable
2022/2023 (8th)	Jujutsu Kaisen (season 2)	MAPPA
2022/2023 (8th)	Spy × Family (season 1 cour 2)	Wit Studio and CloverWorks
2022/2023 (8th)	Vinland Saga (season 2)	MAPPA
2023/2024 (9th)
2023/2024 (9th)	Demon Slayer: Kimetsu no Yaiba Hashira Training Arc (season 4)	Ufotable
2023/2024 (9th)	Bleach: Thousand-Year Blood War – The Conflict	Pierrot Films
2023/2024 (9th)	My Hero Academia (season 7)	Bones
2023/2024 (9th)	One Piece	Toei Animation
2023/2024 (9th)	Oshi no Ko (season 2)	Doga Kobo
2023/2024 (9th)	Spy × Family (season 2)	Wit Studio and CloverWorks
2025 (10th)
2025 (10th)	One Piece	Toei Animation
2025 (10th)	Dandadan (season 2)	Science SARU
2025 (10th)	Kaiju No. 8 (season 2)	Production I.G
2025 (10th)	My Hero Academia: Final Season (season 8)	Bones Film
2025 (10th)	Solo Leveling: Arise from the Shadow (season 2)	A-1 Pictures
2025 (10th)	Spy × Family (season 3)	Wit Studio and CloverWorks

== Records ==
=== Anime series ===
Franchise	Wins	Nominations	Seasons
One Piece	3	5	—
Demon Slayer: Kimetsu no Yaiba	1	3	Entertainment District Arc, Swordsmith Village Arc, Hashira Training Arc
Dragon Ball Super	1	2	—
March Comes In like a Lion	1	2	Season 1, Season 2
Spy × Family	0	3	Season 1 cour 2, Season 2, Season 3
Attack on Titan	0	2	The Final Season Part 2, The Final Season The Final Chapters Special 1
My Hero Academia	0	2	Season 7, Final Season

=== Studios ===
As of 2025, Toei Animation is the only studio to receive multiple wins for the award. They were also nominated six times, the most of any studio to date.

As of 2025, 36 nominations have been given to 18 different studios, of which there are 4 joint nominations consisting of two studios, given a total of 40 nominees so far. Only TMS Entertainment, Pierrot, Toei Animation, and MAPPA, have received multiple nominations in one year. MAPPA has the most nominations for a single year with three in 2023.

Toei Animation received the most wins (4) and nominations (7) for an anime studio, with One Piece became the only anime to win multiple awards.

Studio	Wins	Nominations	Seasons
Toei Animation	4	7	Dragon Ball Super, One Piece
Ufotable	1	3	Demon Slayer: Kimetsu no Yaiba (Entertainment District Arc, Swordsmith Village Arc, Hashira Training Arc)
Shaft	1	2	March Comes In like a Lion (Season 1, Season 2)
MAPPA	0	4	Attack on Titan (The Final Season Part 2, The Final Season The Final Chapters Special 1), Jujutsu Kaisen (Season 2), Vinland Saga (Season 2)
Pierrot	0	4	Black Clover, Bleach: Thousand-Year Blood War (The Conflict), Boruto: Naruto Next Generations, Naruto: Shippuden
Wit Studio	0	4	The Ancient Magus' Bride, Spy × Family (Season 1 cour 2, Season 2, Season 3)
CloverWorks	0	3	Spy × Family (Season 1 cour 2, Season 2, Season 3)
TMS Entertainment	0	3	All Out!!, Case Closed
A-1 Pictures	0	2	Kaguya-sama: Love Is War (Ultra Romantic), Solo Leveling (Arise from the Shadow)
Bones Film	0	2	My Hero Academia (Season 7, Final Season)
