= Crunchyroll Anime Award for Anime of the Year =

- Awarded for: Best anime series of the previous year
- Country: United States; Japan
- First award: MAPPA – Yuri on Ice (2017)
- Currently held by: Bones Film – My Hero Academia: Final Season (2026)

Highlights
- Most wins: Studio: MAPPA (4); Franchise: Jujutsu Kaisen (2)
- Most nominations: Studio: MAPPA (10); Franchise: Demon Slayer: Kimetsu no Yaiba / Jujutsu Kaisen / My Hero Academia (3)
- Website: Crunchyroll Anime Awards

The Crunchyroll Anime Award for Anime of the Year is the final award given at the Crunchyroll Anime Awards since its inaugural edition in 2017. It is given for the best anime series from the previous year. Winners are determined through a combined voting process by judges and public voting.

Yaoi sports anime Yuri on Ice by MAPPA first won the award in 2017. Jujutsu Kaisen by MAPPA won the award in 2021, making MAPPA the first studio to win the award multiple times. In the 8th edition, the award was won by the second season of Jujutsu Kaisen, which also became the first anime to win the top prize twice.

MAPPA received ten nominations and four wins for the award, the most of any studio to date. Bones Film and Wit Studio followed, with seven and six nominations for the award respectively, with Wit Studio being the studio with the most nominations without a single win.

Aside from manga, Studio Trigger and CD Projekt's Cyberpunk: Edgerunners won the award in 2023, making CD Projekt and Edgerunners the first video game studio and anime based on a video game respectively to win. A-1 Pictures's Solo Leveling won the award in 2025, the first series to be based on manhwa to win.

In the latest edition in 2026, the award was won by the eighth and final season of My Hero Academia by Bones Film, the first concluding season of an anime series to win.

== Winners and nominees ==
In the following list, the first titles listed in gold are the winners; those not in gold are nominees, which are listed in alphabetical order. The years given are those in which the ceremonies took place.

=== 2010s ===
Year	Anime	Studio(s)
2016 (1st)
2016 (1st)	Yuri on Ice	MAPPA
2016 (1st)	Descending Stories: Showa Genroku Rakugo Shinju	Studio Deen
2016 (1st)	Erased	A-1 Pictures
2016 (1st)	Joker Game	Production I.G
2016 (1st)	Kabaneri of the Iron Fortress	Wit Studio
2016 (1st)	Mob Psycho 100	Bones
2016 (1st)	My Hero Academia	Bones
2016 (1st)	Re:Zero − Starting Life in Another World	White Fox
2017 (2nd)
2017 (2nd)	Made in Abyss	Kinema Citrus
2017 (2nd)	Descending Stories: Showa Genroku Rakugo Shinju (season 2)	Studio Deen
2017 (2nd)	Land of the Lustrous	Orange
2017 (2nd)	Little Witch Academia	Studio Trigger
2017 (2nd)	March Comes In like a Lion (season 2)	Shaft
2017 (2nd)	My Hero Academia (season 2)	Bones
2018 (3rd)
2018 (3rd)	Devilman Crybaby	Science SARU
2018 (3rd)	A Place Further than the Universe	Madhouse
2018 (3rd)	Hinamatsuri	Feel
2018 (3rd)	Megalo Box	TMS Entertainment
2018 (3rd)	Violet Evergarden	Kyoto Animation
2018 (3rd)	Zombie Land Saga	MAPPA
2019 (4th)
2019 (4th)	Demon Slayer: Kimetsu no Yaiba	Ufotable
2019 (4th)	Carole & Tuesday	Bones
2019 (4th)	Mob Psycho 100 II (season 2)	Bones
2019 (4th)	O Maidens in Your Savage Season	Lay-duce
2019 (4th)	The Promised Neverland	CloverWorks
2019 (4th)	Vinland Saga	Wit Studio

=== 2020s ===
Year	Anime	Studio(s)
2020 (5th)
2020 (5th)	Jujutsu Kaisen	MAPPA
2020 (5th)	Appare-Ranman!	P.A. Works
2020 (5th)	Beastars	Orange
2020 (5th)	Dorohedoro	MAPPA
2020 (5th)	Great Pretender	Wit Studio
2020 (5th)	Keep Your Hands Off Eizouken!	Science SARU
2021 (6th)
2021 (6th)	Attack on Titan: The Final Season Part 1 (season 4)	MAPPA
2021 (6th)	86	A-1 Pictures
2021 (6th)	Jujutsu Kaisen (cour 2)	MAPPA
2021 (6th)	Odd Taxi	OLM and P.I.C.S.
2021 (6th)	Ranking of Kings	Wit Studio
2021 (6th)	Sonny Boy	Madhouse
2021/2022 (7th)
2021/2022 (7th)	Cyberpunk: Edgerunners	Studio Trigger and CD Projekt
2021/2022 (7th)	Attack on Titan: The Final Season Part 2 (season 4 cour 2)	MAPPA
2021/2022 (7th)	Demon Slayer: Kimetsu no Yaiba Entertainment District Arc (season 2)	Ufotable
2021/2022 (7th)	Lycoris Recoil	A-1 Pictures
2021/2022 (7th)	Ranking of Kings (cour 2)	Wit Studio
2021/2022 (7th)	Spy × Family	Wit Studio and CloverWorks
2022/2023 (8th)
2022/2023 (8th)	Jujutsu Kaisen (season 2)	MAPPA
2022/2023 (8th)	Bocchi the Rock!	CloverWorks
2022/2023 (8th)	Chainsaw Man	MAPPA
2022/2023 (8th)	Demon Slayer: Kimetsu no Yaiba Swordsmith Village Arc (season 3)	Ufotable
2022/2023 (8th)	Oshi no Ko	Doga Kobo
2022/2023 (8th)	Vinland Saga (season 2)	MAPPA
2023/2024 (9th)
2023/2024 (9th)	Solo Leveling	A-1 Pictures
2023/2024 (9th)	Dandadan	Science SARU
2023/2024 (9th)	Delicious in Dungeon	Studio Trigger
2023/2024 (9th)	Frieren: Beyond Journey's End	Madhouse
2023/2024 (9th)	Kaiju No. 8	Production I.G
2023/2024 (9th)	The Apothecary Diaries	Toho Animation Studio and OLM
2025 (10th)
2025 (10th)	My Hero Academia: Final Season (season 8)	Bones Film
2025 (10th)	Dandadan (season 2)	Science SARU
2025 (10th)	Gachiakuta	Bones Film
2025 (10th)	Takopi's Original Sin	Enishiya
2025 (10th)	The Apothecary Diaries (season 2)	Toho Animation Studio and OLM
2025 (10th)	The Summer Hikaru Died	CygamesPictures

== Records ==
=== Anime series ===
Franchise	Wins	Nominations	Seasons
Jujutsu Kaisen	2	3	Season 1 cour 1, Season 1 cour 2, Season 2
Demon Slayer: Kimetsu no Yaiba	1	3	Unwavering Resolve Arc, Entertainment District Arc, Swordsmith Village Arc
My Hero Academia	1	3	Season 1, Season 2, Final Season
Attack on Titan	1	2	The Final Season Part 1, The Final Season Part 2
Dandadan	0	2	Season 1, Season 2
Descending Stories: Showa Genroku Rakugo Shinju	0	2	Season 1, Season 2
Mob Psycho 100	0	2	Season 1, Season 2
Ranking of Kings	0	2	Cour 1, Cour 2
The Apothecary Diaries	0	2	Season 1, Season 2
Vinland Saga	0	2	Season 1, Season 2

=== Studios ===
As of 2023, MAPPA is the only studio to receive multiple wins for the award. They were also nominated ten times, the most of any studio to date.

As of 2025, 62 nominations have been given to 25 different studios, of which there are 5 joint nominations consisting of two studios, given a total of 60 nominees so far. Only Bones Film, Wit Studio, and MAPPA have received multiple nominations in one year, with MAPPA winning thrice in 2020, 2021, and 2023, while Bones Film did the same thrice in 2016, 2019 and 2025.

MAPPA received the most wins (4) and nominations (10) for an anime studio, with Jujutsu Kaisen became the only anime to win multiple awards.

Studio	Wins	Nominations	Seasons
MAPPA	4	10	Attack on Titan (The Final Season Part 1, The Final Season Part 2), Chainsaw Man, Dorohedoro, Jujutsu Kaisen (Season 1 cour 1, Season 1 cour 2, Season 2), Vinland Saga (Season 2), Yuri on Ice, Zombie Land Saga
Bones Film	1	7	Carole & Tuesday, Gachiakuta, Mob Psycho 100 (Season 1, Season 2), My Hero Academia (Season 1, Season 2, Final Season)
A-1 Pictures	1	4	86, Erased, Lycoris Recoil, Solo Leveling
Science SARU	1	4	Dandadan (Season 1, Season 2), Devilman Crybaby, Keep Your Hands Off Eizouken!
Studio Trigger	1	3	Cyberpunk: Edgerunners, Delicious in Dungeon, Little Witch Academia,
Ufotable	1	3	Demon Slayer: Kimetsu no Yaiba (Unwavering Resolve Arc, Entertainment District Arc, Swordsmith Village Arc)
Wit Studio	0	6	Great Pretender, Kabaneri of the Iron Fortress, Ranking of Kings (Cour 1, Cour 2), Spy × Family, Vinland Saga (Season 1)
CloverWorks	0	3	Bocchi the Rock!, The Promised Neverland, Spy × Family
Madhouse	0	3	Frieren: Beyond Journey's End, A Place Further than the Universe, Sonny Boy
OLM	0	3	The Apothecary Diaries (Season 1, Season 2), Odd Taxi
Production I.G	0	2	Joker Game, Kaiju No. 8
Orange	0	2	Beastars, Land of the Lustrous
Studio Deen	0	2	Descending Stories: Showa Genroku Rakugo Shinju (Season 1, Season 2)
Toho Animation Studio	0	2	The Apothecary Diaries (Season 1, Season 2)
