= Crunchyroll Anime Award for Best Original Anime =

- Awarded for: Best original anime series of the previous year
- Country: United States; Japan
- First award: A-1 Pictures — Lycoris Recoil (2023)
- Currently held by: MAPPA — Lazarus (2026)

Highlights
- Most nominations: Anime: Birdie Wing: Golf Girls' Story (2); Studio: MAPPA (3)
- Website: Crunchyroll Anime Awards

The Crunchyroll Anime Award for Best Original Anime is a series award given at the Crunchyroll Anime Awards since its seventh edition in 2023. It is given for the best original anime series which only considered the anime that were not adapted from the source material in the previous year. Winners are determined through a combined voting process by judges and public voting.

Action anime Lycoris Recoil by A-1 Pictures first won the award in 2023. MAPPA received the most nominations (3) for an anime studio, with Birdie Wing: Golf Girls' Story became the only anime to be nominated multiple times.

In the latest edition in 2026, Lazarus by MAPPA won the award.

== Winners and nominees ==
In the following list, the first titles listed in gold are the winners; those not in gold are nominees, which are listed in alphabetical order. The years given are those in which the ceremonies took place.

=== 2020s ===
Year	Anime	Studio(s)
2021/2022 (7th)
2021/2022 (7th)	Lycoris Recoil	A-1 Pictures
2021/2022 (7th)	Birdie Wing: Golf Girls' Story	Bandai Namco Pictures
2021/2022 (7th)	Healer Girl	3Hz
2021/2022 (7th)	The Orbital Children	Production +h
2021/2022 (7th)	Vampire in the Garden	Wit Studio
2021/2022 (7th)	Yurei Deco	Science SARU
2022/2023 (8th)
2022/2023 (8th)	Buddy Daddies	P.A. Works
2022/2023 (8th)	Akiba Maid War	P.A. Works
2022/2023 (8th)	Birdie Wing: Golf Girls' Story (season 2)	Bandai Namco Pictures
2022/2023 (8th)	Do It Yourself!!	Pine Jam
2022/2023 (8th)	The Marginal Service	Studio 3Hz
2022/2023 (8th)	Mobile Suit Gundam: The Witch from Mercury	Sunrise
2023/2024 (9th)
2023/2024 (9th)	Ninja Kamui	E&H Production
2023/2024 (9th)	Bucchigiri?!	MAPPA
2023/2024 (9th)	Girls Band Cry	Toei Animation
2023/2024 (9th)	Jellyfish Can't Swim in the Night	Doga Kobo
2023/2024 (9th)	Metallic Rouge	Bones
2023/2024 (9th)	Train to the End of the World	EMT Squared
2025 (10th)
2025 (10th)	Lazarus	MAPPA
2025 (10th)	Apocalypse Hotel	CygamesPictures
2025 (10th)	Digimon Beatbreak	Toei Animation
2025 (10th)	Mobile Suit Gundam GQuuuuuuX	Sunrise and Studio Khara
2025 (10th)	Moonrise	Wit Studio
2025 (10th)	Zenshu	MAPPA

== Records ==
=== Anime series ===
Currently, no anime has both won and nominated in different years for an award more than once.

Franchise	Wins	Nominations	Seasons
Birdie Wing: Golf Girls' Story	0	2	Season 1, Season 2

=== Studios ===
MAPPA holds the record for the most nominations in an anime studio.

Studio	Wins	Nominations	Seasons
MAPPA	1	3	Bucchigiri?!, Lazarus, Zenshu
P.A. Works	1	2	Buddy Daddies, Akiba Maid War
Bandai Namco Pictures	0	2	Birdie Wing: Golf Girls' Story (Season 1, Season 2)
Studio 3Hz	0	2	Healer Girl, The Marginal Service
Sunrise	0	2	Mobile Suit Gundam GQuuuuuuX, Mobile Suit Gundam: The Witch from Mercury
Toei Animation	0	2	Digimon Beatbreak, Girls Band Cry
