= Crunchyroll Anime Award for Best Score =

- Awarded for: Best original score of the previous year
- Country: United States; Japan
- First award: Kevin Penkin — Made in Abyss (2018)
- Currently held by: Go Shiina and Yuki Kajiura — Demon Slayer: Kimetsu no Yaiba – The Movie: Infinity Castle (2026)

Highlights
- Most wins: Composer: Hiroyuki Sawano (3); Anime: Attack on Titan (2)
- Most nominations: Composer: Hiroyuki Sawano (7); Anime: Demon Slayer: Kimetsu no Yaiba (6)
- Website: Crunchyroll Anime Awards

The Crunchyroll Anime Award for Best Score is a music award given at the Crunchyroll Anime Awards since its second edition in 2018. It is given for the best original score in anime films and series from the previous year. Winners are determined through a combined voting process by judges and public voting.

Made in Abyss composer Kevin Penkin first won the award in 2018, the first non-Japanese to win. In the latest edition in 2026, Demon Slayer: Kimetsu no Yaiba – The Movie: Infinity Castle composers Go Shiina and Yuki Kajiura won the award.

== Winners ==
In the following list, the first titles listed in gold are the winners; those not in gold are nominees, which are listed in alphabetical order. The years given are those in which the ceremonies took place.

=== 2010s ===
Year	Composer(s)	Anime
2017 (2nd)
2017 (2nd)	Kevin Penkin	Made in Abyss
2017 (2nd)	Hiroyuki Sawano	Re:Creators
2017 (2nd)	Jun'ichi Matsumoto	The Ancient Magus' Bride
2017 (2nd)	Michiru Ōshima	Little Witch Academia
2017 (2nd)	Ryo Takahashi	ACCA: 13-Territory Inspection Dept.
2017 (2nd)	Yoshiaki Fujisawa	Land of the Lustrous
2019 (4th)
2019 (4th)	Mocky	Carole & Tuesday
2019 (4th)	Go Shiina and Yuki Kajiura	Demon Slayer: Kimetsu no Yaiba
2019 (4th)	Hiroyuki Sawano	Attack on Titan (season 3)
2019 (4th)	Kevin Penkin	The Rising of the Shield Hero
2019 (4th)	Tatsuya Kato, Hiroaki Tsutsumi, and Yuki Kanesaka	Dr. Stone
2019 (4th)	Yugo Kanno	JoJo's Bizarre Adventure: Golden Wind (season 4)

=== 2020s ===
Year	Composer(s)	Anime
2020 (5th)
2020 (5th)	Kevin Penkin	Tower of God
2020 (5th)	Alisa Okehazama	The God of High School
2020 (5th)	Kensuke Ushio	Japan Sinks: 2020
2020 (5th)	Oorutaichi	Keep Your Hands Off Eizouken!
2020 (5th)	Satoru Kōsaki	Beastars
2020 (5th)	Yutaka Yamada	Great Pretender
2021 (6th)
2021 (6th)	Go Shiina and Yuki Kajiura	Demon Slayer: Kimetsu no Yaiba Mugen Train Arc (season 2)
2021 (6th)	DÉ DÉ MOUSE and Mito	Wonder Egg Priority
2021 (6th)	Satoru Kōsaki	Vivy: Fluorite Eye's Song
2021 (6th)	Mabanua	Megalobox 2: Nomad
2021 (6th)	PUNPEE, VaVa, and OMSB	Odd Taxi
2021 (6th)	Hiroyuki Sawano and Kohta Yamamoto	86
2021/2022 (7th)
2021/2022 (7th)	Hiroyuki Sawano and Kohta Yamamoto	Attack on Titan: The Final Season Part 2 (season 4 cour 2)
2021/2022 (7th)	Akira Yamaoka	Cyberpunk: Edgerunners
2021/2022 (7th)	Genki Hikota	Ya Boy Kongming!
2021/2022 (7th)	Go Shiina and Yuki Kajiura	Demon Slayer: Kimetsu no Yaiba Entertainment District Arc (season 2 cour 2)
2021/2022 (7th)	Kevin Penkin	Made in Abyss: The Golden City of the Scorching Sun
2021/2022 (7th)	(K)now Name	Spy × Family
2022/2023 (8th)
2022/2023 (8th)	Hiroyuki Sawano and Kohta Yamamoto	Attack on Titan: The Final Season The Final Chapters Special 1 (season 4 cour 3)
2022/2023 (8th)	Go Shiina and Yuki Kajiura	Demon Slayer: Kimetsu no Yaiba Swordsmith Village Arc (season 3)
2022/2023 (8th)	Kensuke Ushio	Chainsaw Man
2022/2023 (8th)	Radwimps and Kazuma Jinnouchi	Suzume
2022/2023 (8th)	Takuro Iga	Oshi no Ko
2022/2023 (8th)	Tomoki Kikuya	Bocchi the Rock!
2023/2024 (9th)
2023/2024 (9th)	Hiroyuki Sawano	Solo Leveling
2023/2024 (9th)	Evan Call	Frieren: Beyond Journey's End
2023/2024 (9th)	Go Shiina and Yuki Kajiura	Demon Slayer: Kimetsu no Yaiba Hashira Training Arc (season 4)
2023/2024 (9th)	Haruka Nakamura	Look Back
2023/2024 (9th)	Kensuke Ushio	Dandadan
2023/2024 (9th)	Shirō Sagisu	Bleach: Thousand-Year Blood War – The Conflict
2025 (10th)
2025 (10th)	Go Shiina and Yuki Kajiura	Demon Slayer: Kimetsu no Yaiba – The Movie: Infinity Castle
2025 (10th)	Kensuke Ushio	Chainsaw Man – The Movie: Reze Arc
2025 (10th)	Kensuke Ushio	Dandadan (season 2)
2025 (10th)	Taku Iwasaki	Gachiakuta
2025 (10th)	Hiroyuki Sawano	Solo Leveling: Arise from the Shadow (season 2)
2025 (10th)	Satoru Kōsaki, Kevin Penkin, Alisa Okehazama	The Apothecary Diaries (season 2)

== Records ==
=== Anime series ===
Franchise	Wins	Nominations	Seasons
Demon Slayer: Kimetsu no Yaiba	2	6	Unwavering Resolve Arc, Mugen Train Arc, Entertainment District Arc, Swordsmith Village Arc, Hashira Training Arc, Infinity Castle
Attack on Titan	2	3	Season 3, The Final Season Part 2, The Final Season The Final Chapters Special 1
Made in Abyss	1	2	Season 1, The Golden City of the Scorching Sun
Solo Leveling	1	2	Season 1, Arise from the Shadow
Chainsaw Man	0	2	Season 1, Reze Arc
Dandadan	0	2	Season 1, Season 2

=== Composer ===
Composer	Wins	Nominations	Anime
Hiroyuki Sawano	3	7	86, Attack on Titan (Season 3, The Final Season Part 2, The Final Season The Final Chapters Special 1), Re:Creators, Solo Leveling (Season 1, Arise from the Shadow)
Go Shiina	2	6	Demon Slayer: Kimetsu no Yaiba (Unwavering Resolve Arc, Mugen Train Arc, Entertainment District Arc, Swordsmith Village Arc, Hashira Training Arc, Infinity Castle)
Yuki Kajiura	2	6	Demon Slayer: Kimetsu no Yaiba (Unwavering Resolve Arc, Mugen Train Arc, Entertainment District Arc, Swordsmith Village Arc, Hashira Training Arc, Infinity Castle)
Kevin Penkin	2	5	Made in Abyss (Season 1, The Golden City of the Scorching Sun), The Apothecary Diaries (Season 2), The Rising of the Shield Hero, Tower of God
Kohta Yamamoto	2	3	86, Attack on Titan (The Final Season Part 2, The Final Season The Final Chapters Special 1)
Kensuke Ushio	0	5	Chainsaw Man (Season 1, Reze Arc), Dandadan (Season 1, Season 2), Japan Sinks: 2020
Satoru Kōsaki	0	3	Beastars, The Apothecary Diaries (Season 2), Vivy: Fluorite Eye's Song
Alisa Okehazama	0	2	The Apothecary Diaries (Season 2), The God of High School
