= 2nd Crunchyroll Anime Awards =

2018 award ceremony

- Awarded for: Excellence in anime
- Date: February 24, 2018
- Location: Ricardo Montalban Theater, Los Angeles
- Country: United States
- Presented by: Crunchyroll
- Hosted by: Anthony Carboni; Erika Ishii

Highlights
- Most wins: My Hero Academia (7)
- Most nominations: My Hero Academia (10)
- Anime of the Year: Made in Abyss
- Best Film: Your Name

The 2nd Crunchyroll Anime Awards were held on February 24, 2018, honoring excellence in anime from 2017. The nominees were announced on January 18. Voting began on January 22, and was held in three separate rounds from January 22 to February 11. The winners were announced on February 24. It featured 17 categories. This edition made several changes from the previous one, including having six nominations for all categories instead of four. The awards for Best Couple, Best Fight Scene, and Most Heartwarming Scene were dropped. New categories were presented, including Best Score, Best Film, Best CGI, Best Continuing Series, and Best Slice of Life. It also marks the first (and currently, the only) time that an award was presented for a manga. 'Hero of the Year' and 'Villain of the Year' awards were renamed as "Best Hero" and "Best Villain" awards respectively. A special category, the Industry Icon Award, was presented for the first time to honor influential figures in the industry and the art.

The second season of My Hero Academia led the nominations with ten, eventually winning seven of it. The season was the most awarded anime in awards history, until it was surpassed by the second season of Jujutsu Kaisen in 2024. My Hero Academia and Descending Stories: Showa Genroku Rakugo Shinju were nominated for the Anime of the Year award for the second straight time. My Hero Academia's Izuku Midoriya won the Best Hero award for the second straight time as well. The awards for Best Boy and Best Girl saw two nominations from the same franchise. Your Name won in the Best Film category, while My Lesbian Experience with Loneliness won Best Manga. Made in Abyss won the Anime of the Year, as well as Best Score.

The inaugural Industry Icon Award was given to voice actor Christopher Sabat for his English voice works on anime such as Vegeta and Piccolo of the Dragon Ball franchise and All Might of My Hero Academia. The awards were presented at the Ricardo Montalban Theater in Los Angeles. It is a live show hosted by Anthony Carboni and Erika Ishii. Several prominent personalities of the western anime community, including some anime YouTubers, were invited to present the awards.

== Winners and nominees ==
Winners are listed first, highlighted in boldface, and indicated with a double dagger (‡). The lists are arranged alphabetically, except for the winner.

**Anime of the Year**: **Made in Abyss—Kinema Citrus**‡; Descending Stories: Showa Genroku Rakugo Shinju (season 2) - Studio Deen; Land of the Lustrous—Orange; Little Witch Academia—Studio Trigger; March Comes In like a Lion (season 2)—Shaft; My Hero Academia (season 2)—Bones	**Best Film**: **Your Name—CoMix Wave Films**‡; A Silent Voice—Kyoto Animation; Fate/stay night: Heaven's Feel I. presage flower—Ufotable; Girls und Panzer der Film—Actas; In This Corner of the World—MAPPA; Kizumonogatari III: Reiketsu-hen—Shaft
**Best Hero**: **Izuku "Deku" Midoriya—My Hero Academia (season 2)**‡; Atsuko "Akko" Kagari—Little Witch Academia; Chise Hatori—The Ancient Magus' Bride; Gin Minowa—Yuki Yuna is a Hero; Kukuri—Magical Circle Guru Guru; Nanachi—Made in Abyss	**Best Villain**: **Stain—My Hero Academia (season 2)**‡; Bondrewd—Made in Abyss; Cartaphilus—The Ancient Magus' Bride; Hiro Shishigami—Inuyashiki; Tanya Degurechaff—Saga of Tanya the Evil; Usagi—Juni Taisen: Zodiac War
**Best Boy**: **Shoto Todoroki—My Hero Academia (season 2)**‡; Fafnir—Miss Kobayashi's Dragon Maid; Izuku "Deku" Midoriya—My Hero Academia (season 2); Kazuma Sato—KonoSuba: God's Blessing on This Wonderful World! (season 2); Rei Kiriyama—March Comes In like a Lion; Yakumo Yuurakutei—Descending Stories: Showa Genroku Rakugo Shinju	**Best Girl**: **Ochaco Uraraka—My Hero Academia (season 2)**‡; Atsuko "Akko" Kagari—Little Witch Academia; Chise Hatori—The Ancient Magus' Bride; Moriko Morioka—Recovery of an MMO Junkie; Serval—Kemono Friends; Tsuyu Asui—My Hero Academia (season 2)
**Best Opening**: **"Peace Sign" by Kenshi Yonezu—My Hero Academia (season 2)**‡; "Here" by JUNNA—The Ancient Magus' Bride; "Imawa no Shinigami" by Megumi Hayashibara—Descending Stories: Showa Genroku Rakugo Shinju (season 2); "Shadow and Truth" by ONE III NOTES—ACCA: 13-Territory Inspection Dept.; "Shinzou wo Sasageyo!" by Linked Horizon—Attack on Titan (season 2); "The Other Side of the Wall" by Void_Chords feat. MARU—Princess Principal	**Best Ending**: **"Ishukan Communication" by Chorogonzu – Miss Kobayashi's Dragon Maid**‡; "behind" by Karin Isobe, Yuna Yoshino, and Lynn—Just Because!; "Hikari, Hikari" by Yuuka Aisaka—Recovery of an MMO Junkie; "Kafune" by Brian the Sun—March Comes In like a Lion (season 2); "Kirameku Hamabe" by Yuiko Ōhara—Land of the Lustrous; "Step Up LOVE" by Daoko x Yasuyuki Okamura—Blood Blockade Battlefront & Beyond (season 2)
**Best Animation**: **My Hero Academia** **(season 2)—Bones**‡; A Silent Voice—Kyoto Animation; Land of the Lustrous— Orange; Little Witch Academia— Studio Trigger; March Comes In like a Lion (season 2)— Shaft; Miss Kobayashi's Dragon Maid— Kyoto Animation	**Best Drama**: **The Ancient Magus' Bride—Wit Studio**‡; ACCA: 13-Territory Inspection Dept.—Madhouse; Descending Stories: Showa Genroku Rakugo Shinju (season 2)—Studio Deen; Made in Abyss—Kinema Citrus; March Comes In like a Lion (season 2)—Shaft; Scum's Wish—Lerche
**Best Comedy**: **Miss Kobayashi's Dragon Maid— Kyoto Animation**‡; Gamers!—Pine Jam; KonoSuba: God's Blessing on This Wonderful World! (season 2)—Studio Deen; Little Witch Academia—Studio Trigger; Mr. Osomatsu (season 2)—Pierrot; Tsuredure Children—Studio Gokumi	**Best Score**: **Made in Abyss—Kevin Penkin**‡; ACCA: 13-Territory Inspection Dept.—Ryo Takahashi; Land of the Lustrous—Yoshiaki Fujisawa; Little Witch Academia—Michiru Ōshima; Re:Creators—Hiroyuki Sawano; The Ancient Magus' Bride—Jun'ichi Matsumoto
**Best Action**: **My Hero Academia (season 2)—Bones**‡; Attack on Titan (season 2)—Wit Studio; Blood Blockade Battlefront & Beyond (season 2)—Bones; Fate/Apocrypha—A-1 Pictures; Land of the Lustrous—Orange; Mobile Suit Gundam: Iron-Blooded Orphans (season 2)—Sunrise	**Best Continuing Series**: **March Comes In like a Lion—Shaft**‡; All Out!!—Madhouse/TMS Entertainment; Case Closed—TMS Entertainment; Dragon Ball Super—Toei Animation; Mobile Suit Gundam: Iron-Blooded Orphans—Sunrise; Naruto: Shippuden—Pierrot
**Best CGI**: **Land of the Lustrous—Orange**‡; Attack on Titan (season 2)—Wit Studio; Inuyashiki—MAPPA; Kado: The Right Answer—Toei Animation; Knight's & Magic—Eight Bit; Re:Creators—Troyca	**Best Slice of Life**: **Girls' Last Tour—White Fox**‡; Interviews with Monster Girls—A-1 Pictures; Kemono Friends—Yaoyorozu; Recovery of an MMO Junkie—Signal.MD; Sakura Quest—P.A. Works; Tsuki ga Kirei—Feel
**Best Manga**: **My Lesbian Experience with Loneliness—Kabi Nagata**‡; Delicious in Dungeon—Ryōko Kui; Descending Stories: Showa Genroku Rakugo Shinju—Haruko Kumota; Golden Kamuy—Satoru Noda; In This Corner of the World—Fumiyo Kōno; My Brother's Husband—Gengoroh Tagame	**Industry Icon Award**: **Christopher Sabat**‡

== Statistics ==
Anime with multiple nominations
Nominations	Anime
10	My Hero Academia (season 2)
6	Land of the Lustrous
6	Little Witch Academia
6	March Comes In like a Lion (season 2)
6	The Ancient Magus' Bride
5	Descending Stories: Showa Genroku Rakugo Shinju (season 2)
5	Made in Abyss
4	Miss Kobayashi's Dragon Maid
3	ACCA: 13-Territory Inspection Dept.
3	Attack on Titan (season 2)
3	Recovery of an MMO Junkie
2	A Silent Voice
2	Blood Blockade Battlefront & Beyond (season 2)
2	In This Corner of the World
2	Inuyashiki
2	Kemono Friends
2	KonoSuba: God's Blessing on This Wonderful World! (season 2)
2	Mobile Suit Gundam: Iron-Blooded Orphans
2	Re:Creators

Anime with multiple wins
Wins	Anime
8	My Hero Academia (season 2)
2	Made in Abyss
2	Miss Kobayashi's Dragon Maid
