= Buddy Daddies =

Japanese anime television series

- Anime key visual
- Created by: Aniplex; Nitroplus; P.A. Works; Vio Shimokura (original story)
- Anime television series
- Directed by: Yoshiyuki Asai
- Written by: Vio Shimokura; Yūko Kakihara; Yasuhiro Nakanishi
- Music by: Katsutoshi Kitagawa
- Studio: P.A. Works
- Licensed by: Crunchyroll
- Original network: Tokyo MX, GYT, GTV, BS11, ABC, Mētele
- English network: SEA: Animax Asia; US: Crunchyroll Channel
- Original run: January 7, 2023 – April 1, 2023
- Episodes: 12
- icon

Buddy Daddies is an original Japanese anime action comedy television series produced by P.A. Works. It was directed by Yoshiyuki Asai and written by Vio Shimokura of Nitroplus, Yūko Kakihara, and Yasuhiro Nakanishi, with Katsutoshi Kitagawa of Round Table composing the music. Katsumi Enami provided the original character designs, and Souichirou Sako adapted the designs for animation while also serving as chief animation director along with Sanae Satō. It aired from January to April 2023, on Tokyo MX and other networks.

== Plot ==
Buddy Daddies centers on a family of three who are not related to each other: Kazuki Kurusu and Rei Suwa, assassins who live under one roof; and a little girl, Miri. She is the daughter of Kazuki and Rei's assassination target who ends up being picked up by Kazuki. After killing their target, Kazuki tells Miri that he is her father, to protect Miri from the truth.

== Characters ==
Kazuki Kurusu (来栖一騎, Kurusu Kazuki)
Voiced by: Toshiyuki Toyonaga (Japanese); Landon McDonald (English)
He is a 28-year-old assassin. Rei's assassin buddy who takes care of him. On duty, he focuses on collecting information in advance, and executing the plan. He has good communication skills, and likes gambling. He is good at cooking and cleaning. He had a wife, Yuzuko, who was pregnant with his child, but lost them due to an accident related to one of his missions.
Rei Suwa (諏訪零, Suwa Rei)
Voiced by: Koki Uchiyama (Japanese); David Matranga (English)
He is a 25-year-old assassin who works alongside Kazuki, and becomes close friends with him. He specialises in combat on missions and tends to go over the top. He lets his hair down when off-duty and lives a hikikomori lifestyle, playing video games all night and sleeping during the day. He does not smile, due to his abusive upbringing by his father, the head of an assassin family. He slowly warms up to Miri and accepts his role as one of her fathers alongside Kazuki.
Miri Unasaka (海坂ミリ, Unasaka Miri)
Voiced by: Hina Kino (Japanese); Emi Lo (English)
A four-year-old girl who was sent away by her mother to be in the care of her biological father when her mother no longer wanted to care for her. It is revealed that her father was Kazuki and Rei's most recent target, whom they assassinated. Kazuki takes it upon himself to become her guardian with Rei warming up to the role later. She loves teasing and playing with Kazuki and Rei. She affectionately calls Kazuki and Rei her "Papas".
Kyūtarō Kugi (九棋久太郎, Kugi Kyūtarō)
Voiced by: Toshiyuki Morikawa (Japanese); Austin Tindle (English)
A cafe owner who supplies Rei and Kazuki with both jobs and information.
Anna Hanyu (羽生杏奈, Hanyu Anna)
Voiced by: Haruka Terui (Japanese); Kelsey Poppen (English)
Teacher at the Aozora Daycare that Miri attends.
Yuzuko Kurusu (来栖柚子, Kurusu Yuzuko)
Voiced by: Shizuka Itō
Kazuki's late wife who was killed by accident during one of his missions.
Karin Izumi (泉かりん, Izumi Karin)
Voiced by: Ikumi Hasegawa (Japanese); Hope Endrenyi (English)
Yuzuko's younger sister and Kazuki's sister-in-law.
Misaki Unasaka (海坂美咲, Unasaka Misaki)
Voiced by: Nanako Mori (Japanese); Morgan Berry (English)
Miri's mother. She is a prostitute who works as a singer at a struggling night club run by her abusive boyfriend. She comes to resent Miri due to an unplanned pregnancy and abandons her as a result. But when she's later diagnosed with throat cancer she has a change of heart. She's later killed when Ogino, disguised as deliveryman, guns her down in her own apartment; while dying in Kazuki's arms, she tearfully apologizes and says goodbye to a sleeping Miri.
Ryo Ogino (小木埜了, Ogino Ryō)
Voiced by: Mitsuaki Madono
An assassin and the main antagonist. He is a cold-blooded killer who kills without holding any feelings towards any of his victims. He is acquainted with Kyutaro and was involved in the incident that led to Yuzuko's death, and has a grudge against Rei for leaving his father's organization.

== Episodes ==
The opening theme song is "Shock!" by Ayase, while the ending theme song is "My Plan" by DURDN.

Crunchyroll streamed the series worldwide outside of Asia, and they premiered it along with an English dub.

No.	Title	Directed by	Written by	Storyboarded by	Original release date
1	"Piece of Cake"	Tomoaki Ōta	Yūko Kakihara	Yoshiyuki Asai	January 7, 2023
Two professional assassins, immature Kazuki and stoic Rei, assassinate a smuggler but are abruptly called away to care for their daughter Miri. Several months previously on Christmas Eve Kazuki and Rei share an apartment while operating as assassins with support from their handler Kyutaro. Kazuki is haunted by memories of his pregnant wife and is seen regularly sending portions of his wages to someone. Their next target is a human trafficker hosting a party at a hotel. Kazuki infiltrates the party delivering a cake with Rei inside the food trolley. Meanwhile, a young girl named Miri arrives in the city alone, heads to the hotel and enters the elevator with them, ruining their plan. Miri reveals she is looking for her father, who she has never met, as her mother had told her he would definitely be at the hotel on Christmas Eve. Miri unknowingly blows their cover and she is taken hostage by the target. Kazuki frantically claims he is Miri's father, so Miri jumps into Kazuki's arms allowing Rei to shoot the target. Returning to their apartment with Miri they find photographs in her bag revealing the target they killed was Miri's biological father.
2	"The Kiss of Death"	Noriyoshi Sasaki	Yūko Kakihara	Yoshiyuki Asai	January 14, 2023
As they killed her biological father they consider returning Miri to her mother, but Miri is too young to know where her mother lives. Desperate, they leave Miri in their apartment and convince Kyutaro to research their victims’ girlfriends, hoping to locate Miri's mother without revealing Miri's existence to Kyutaro, who is already angry at how badly they carried out the assassination. They also receive their next mission. Kyutaro is visited by another mysterious assassin named Ogino. Returning home they are dismayed Miri has trashed the apartment in their absence. Their next target is a drug kingpin but they are forced to take Miri with them on mission. Kazuki infiltrates the house but Miri exposes him and they are both almost killed. Rei saves them and they are forced to escape without killing their target. Kyutaro fires them from the mission but informs them he has located a woman likely to be their victim's girlfriend. The two are relieved she is likely Miri's mother so they will soon be rid of Miri and can get back to work. Meanwhile Ogino succeeds in killing the kingpin and his guards.
3	"Spice of Life"	Shin'ya Kawatsura	Yūko Kakihara	Jong Heo, Yoshiyuki Asai	January 21, 2023
Seeing Kazuki interact happily with Miri, Rei questions whether Kazuki really wants to return her. Kazuki confirms assassins don’t make good parents. After much apologizing, Kazuki receives the address of Miri's mother from the still angry Kyutaro. Rei, who had a particularly harsh childhood, does his best not to interact with Miri. Visiting the address Kazuki discovers it is a cheap bar and that Miri's mother Misaki Unasaka is a singer/prostitute with an abusive boyfriend/pimp. Rei looks after Miri in a nearby park but while reliving memories of his father raising him to fight and kill Miri goes missing. Miri's mother, mentally broken by her terrible life, resents Miri for being born and refuses to take responsibility so Kazuki leaves, disgusted that a parent could hate their own child. Rei finds two policemen trying to take Miri as a lost child and considers abandoning her, but when she cries he decides to be better than his own father and retrieves her, claiming he is her Papa. The two take Miri home with them a second time, as her fathers.
4	"What Will Be, Will Be"	Masakazu Takahashi	Yūko Kakihara	Jong Heo	January 28, 2023
With Miri preventing them working Kazuki and Rei decide to enroll Miri in day-care but discover parents must provide the government with employment and tax records, which as assassins Kazuki and Rei do not have. Instead Kazuki spends all night forging the necessary records. With permission to enroll Miri in government day-care they interview and manage to enroll her in a day-care nearby, despite Miri blurting out details of their criminal acts. Hoping to make a good impression they buy Miri all the best clothes and supplies and pose as wealthy parents, earning admiration from a group of mothers. Miri finds other children won’t play with her. Kazuki and Rei beg Kyutaro for another mission and he agrees to give them the next available job. Over the next week Kazuki finds Miri becoming depressed and learns from day-care manager Anna that Miri's expensive clothes make her stand out, so other children are scared to play with her. Seeing their mistake they take Miri on a much cheaper shopping trip to buy more normal clothing and Miri makes several friends. As a surprise Kazuki and Rei redecorate a spare room to be Miri's bedroom.
5	"Crunch Time"	Tetsuo Ichimura	Yūko Kakihara	Tetsuo Ichimura	February 4, 2023
Having run out of money Kazuki and Rei must beg Kyutaro for work. Not trusting them with assassinations Kyutaro gives them several intelligence gathering missions. Unfortunately, the day-care suffers a flu outbreak and closes for a week. Miri is given homework to learn about her parents careers, so they must care for Miri at home, lie to her about their jobs, then gather intelligence while Miri sleeps. Rei falls asleep while watching Miri so she decides to sneak out and follow Kazuki to learn about his job and ends up at Kyutaro's bar. Kazuki claims to have been babysitting her to make extra money. Kyutaro is suspicious and offers to babysit Miri so they can finish intelligence gathering. Afraid Miri might blurt the truth if left too long Kazuki and Rei rush to finish their work. Responding to Miri's questioning Kyutaro claims Kazuki is a comedian and Rei an oil baron. Kyutaro quickly realises Miri is being raised by them but luckily doesn’t mind as long as it doesn’t affect their work. Miri presents her report to her day-care class, causing a stir among the mothers group that Miri's papas are secret oil billionaires.
6	"Love Is Blind"	Tatsuya Sasaki	Yūko Kakihara	Toshiya Shinohara	February 11, 2023
Kazuki begins to worry having assassin parents might influence Miri to develop antisocial behaviour. His first opportunity to prevent this comes when Anna reports Miri hit her friend Taiga. Miri insists it was Taiga's fault and argues with Kazuki for the first time. The next morning Miri asks Rei to take her to day-care instead. Due to his guilt Kazuki forgets Miri's lunch and decides they must take it to her even though the day-care is on a zoo trip. Taiga, a loud troublemaker, sneaks away from Anna and becomes lost with Miri. Meanwhile, an armed robber hides from police in the zoo. Kazuki notices Miri sensibly looking after Taiga despite their fight. Miri realises she has no lunch so Taiga shares his own, revealing he caused their original fight for which he apologises. The robber steals Miri's lunch and threatens her with a gun. Disguised as zoo mascots Kazuki and Rei apprehend him. Miri and Taiga return to Anna safely. Kazuki realises Miri is growing up perfectly normally, though he refuses to ever let Taiga become her boyfriend. Miri returns home, forgives Kazuki, and they share her missing lunch. Meanwhile, a woman named Karin visits Kyutaro's bar.
7	"After Rain Comes Fair Weather"	Mitsutaka Noshitani	Yasuhiro Nakanishi	Masayuki Kojima	February 18, 2023
Miri is almost hit by a car, causing Kazuki to remember a traumatic event. He later finds a photo of his wife, Yuzuko, and decides he doesn’t deserve to be happy. The stress of caring for Miri and Rei causes him to lose his temper and leave. A panicked Rei takes Miri to day-care on his own in the rain. Kazuki hides at Kyutaro's bar where Karin, revealed as his sister-in-law, has returned all the money he has been sending her. Rei discovers it is the weekend and day-care is closed. Karin finds Kazuki and it is revealed Yuzuko and their unborn child died in a car explosion caused by Kazuki chasing an assassination target. Miri develops a fever from the rain so Rei rushes her to Kyutaro for help. Kazuki visits Yuzuko's grave where Karin reveals she is moving past Yuzuko's death and going to university in France. She also reminds Kazuki that Yuzuko wanted him to be happy, so it is alright to be happy raising Miri. Kazuki returns home, finds Rei exhausted and Miri recovering from the fever and life returns to normal. Kazuki retrieves Yuzuko's photograph from its drawer and displays it on his desk.
8	"Nothing Seek, Nothing Find"	Akira Takamura, Noriyoshi Sasaki, Yoshiyuki Asai	Yasuhiro Nakanishi	Tensai Okamura	February 25, 2023
Rei is summoned by his father, Shigeki Suwa. Kazuki and Miri are shown plotting something in Rei's absence. Shigeki, head of a major assassin organization, thinks of himself as underworld nobility and demands Rei stop trying to rebel like an angry teenager, return home and carry on their family line. Rei asks for more time and Shigeki agrees but orders Rei to assassinate Satoru Kaji, the man who trained him to fight, who recently betrayed their organization. Kazuki and Miri prepare a party for Rei's birthday. Rei learns Satoru fell in love and tried to leave the organization, so Shigeki had his girlfriend killed. Despite the injustice, Rei engages Satoru in a lengthy fight with the former failing to save the latter in a last-minute struggle at the end. Disgusted at Shigeki and at himself, Rei wonders whether he is only fit to be a tool for assassination or if he deserves something better like his instructor wanted. Kazuki abruptly arrives to drag him home, showing him the party Miri prepared. Despite everything, Rei actually smiles. Meanwhile, Shigeki (through Ogino) sends Kyutaro a demand for information on Kazuki and Miri by showing him a picture of the latter two together in the open.
8.5	"Cherry-Pick"	Unknown	Yūsuke Kanbayashi	TBA	March 4, 2023
Recap (Intermission) of Episodes 1 to 8.
9	"No Sweet Without Sweat"	Noriyoshi Sasaki	Yūko Kakihara	Hideaki Kurakawa	March 11, 2023
Miri trains to win at her day-care's sports event. The night before Rei sneaks onto the field for an unknown purpose. Rei shocks Kazuki by making riceballs to add to the picnic Kazuki made. At day-care it transpires Rei ensured they got a good spot to watch Miri by booby-trapping it with razor wire, causing other parents some concern. Rei sees first-hand how popular Kazuki is with other parents and also that most of the mothers have crushes on them both. After the morning events, most of which Rei didn’t understand, they stop for lunch. Rei's rice balls are popular with the children since he filled them with sweets and snacks. During the race Miri trained for Rei finds himself cheering for her, though this is such a shock Miri trips and comes in last place, for which Rei blames himself. Kazuki assists Miri in the parent/child obstacle course while Rei watches depressed. Part of the course is a scavenger hunt, with Miri choosing Rei as her item and winning gold. Miri reveals her item to find was “family”, causing Kazuki to cry. Meanwhile, Ogino shows Kyutaro photographs of Rei with Kazuki and Miri at the daycare event as a reminder to provide the organization with information that was requested a while back.
10	"Lost at Sea"	Hayato Sakai	Yūko Kakihara	Chizuko Kusakabe	March 18, 2023
Miri's mother Misaki reappears, wanting Miri back. Unable to argue in front of Miri they are forced to let Misaki into their apartment. Kazuki and Rei learn from Misaki she contracted throat cancer and can’t sing anymore so her boyfriend/pimp fired her. Uncertain how long she has to live Misaki wants to take Miri and live with her parents who can adopt Miri after her death. Kazuki is unsure so Misaki hints she knows about their assassin careers and isn’t afraid to blackmail them. Later, Kyutaro reveals he called Misaki himself, passing on a threat from Boss; either Rei returns to the organization or Ogino will kill Kazuki and Miri to punish Rei's betrayal. Recognising their situation they realise they can’t keep Miri safe anymore. They take Miri on one last fun filled day out to say goodbye. Along the way Kazuki wonders if one day Miri learned the truth would she hate them. Eventually they hand Miri over to Misaki, pretending she is having a sleepover and will see them in the morning. As they watch Miri leave they accept they will never see her again or get another chance at normal happiness.
11	"Everyone Will Be Hypocrites"	Masakazu Takahashi, Yūri Hagiwara	Yasuhiro Nakanishi	Katsumi Terahigashi, Yūichi Abe	March 25, 2023
Kazuki and Rei do not handle Miri's absence well. Rei returns to his father. Misaki and Miri move into an apartment nearby so Miri can still attend day-care. Kazuki asks to work but Kyutaro is worried about his mental state and refuses to let him. Shigeki betrays Rei by informing him that, to cut all Rei's ties to his life outside the organization, he will kill Kazuki and Miri. Rei immediately messages Kazuki to save Miri. Ogino shoots both Misaki and Kazuki but is forced to flee when the hidden Kyutaro phones the police. Misaki dies in Kazuki's arms so he and Kyutaro take the sleeping Miri with them. Rei joins them at a safehouse Shigeki doesn’t know about. Kazuki decides to fake Miri's death and send her to an orphanage far from Japan, but this time Rei is determined to find a way to stay together while protecting Miri. Kazuki agrees but insists if Rei is serious then this time he will help with chores and limit himself to an hour of games a day, to Rei's considerable distress. They thus inform Kyutaro that they quit being assassins and are now Miri's full time papas.
12	"Daughter Daddies"	Tomoaki Ōta	Vio Shimokura	Tensai Okamura, Yoshiyuki Asai	April 1, 2023
With Christmas approaching Kazuki has no idea what Miri wants as she had already given her Santa letter to Misaki. They hide Misaki's death from Miri who is sad. Misaki will miss the day-cares Christmas party, so they promise they will both attend after their important job is done. They travel to the organization to speak with Shigeki but are forced to shoot their way in instead. They encounter Ogino whom they kill together after a difficult fight. Rei insists on facing Shigeki alone, sending Kazuki to find an escape vehicle. After wounding Shigeki in a shootout Rei announces he is leaving the organization to be with his real family, then intentionally cripples his own right arm so he can never be an assassin again. Shigeki almost shoots Rei in the back but finally lets him go. They make it back in time for the day-care party, to Miri's delight, concealing their numerous bloody injuries under Santa costumes. Ten years later Kazuki and Rei run a diner together, the Diner Nest, where Rei's French Toast is the signature dish. The teenage Miri is now in high school and lives happily with her two papas.

== Production ==
According to Mitsuhito Tsuji and Toba Yosuke, Buddy Daddies is inspired by some of the anime staff members who have children.

== Reception ==
At the 8th Crunchyroll Anime Awards in 2024, Buddy Daddies won the award for Best Original Anime. The series was nominated for Best Comedy, while Miri Unasaka was nominated for "Must Protect at All Costs" Character category.
