= Birdie Wing =

Japanese anime television series

- Birdie Wing: Golf Girls' Story
- Key visual
- Genre: Sports (Golf)
- Creator: BN Pictures
- Director: Takayuki Inagaki
- Screenplay: Yōsuke Kuroda
- Music: Kōtarō Nakagawa; Hironori Anazawa
- Country of origin: Japan
- Original language: Japanese
- No. of seasons: 2
- No. of episodes: 25

Production
- Studio: BN Pictures
- Producers: Akihiro Sekiyama; Kohei Fukuda
- Production companies: BN Pictures; TV Tokyo

Original release
- Networks: TXN (TV Tokyo) (S1); TV Tokyo, BS TV Tokyo (S2)
- Release: April 6, 2022 – June 24, 2023

Related
- Video game
- Developer: Viverse
- Publisher: WOWWOW Technology
- Genre: Sports
- Platform: Nintendo Switch
- Released: June 15, 2023

Birdie Wing: Golf Girls' Story (stylized as BIRDIE WING -Golf Girls' Story-) is an original Japanese anime television series about golf produced by BN Pictures and directed by Takayuki Inagaki. The first season aired from April to June 2022, while a second season aired from April to June 2023. A sports video game developed by Viverse and WOWWOW Technology was released in June 2023.

== Plot ==
In the European state of Nafrece, a girl named Eve uses her crude yet effective golfing style to act as a ringer and take money from various challengers in unsanctioned golf games, hoping to earn enough to secure a future for her adopted family and their bar. However, one day after beating another challenger, Eve meets with Japanese golfing prodigy Aoi Amawashi, who manages to defeat her in a 1-hole match. After suffering that defeat, Eve becomes obsessed with her newfound purpose of challenging Aoi to a full 18-hole match and beating her, while Aoi finds herself infatuated with Eve's attitude and determination. However, Eve is forced to battle through various challenges thrown in front of her by the Nafrece mafia, while Aoi's mother and her personal assistant try to get her to focus on her budding golf career.

== Characters ==
Eve (イヴ, Ivu)
Voiced by: Akari Kitō
A girl with a bullish golf style who makes money from underground golf games. Using her "Rainbow Bullet" and other golf styles, she easily defeats her opponents. Later on in the series, she enrolls in an all-girls school with a strong golf program, where Aoi and the others also attend. In Season 2, it is revealed that her full name is Evangeline Burton.
Aoi Amawashi (天鷲葵, Amawashi Aoi)
Voiced by: Asami Seto
Daughter of the Amawashi Group's CEO, she is a skilled golf player who is part of the golf club at Raiho Girls' Academy. It is said that her smile can grind her opponents to defeat. However, she has a rare disease that threatens her life. Her admiration and inspiration for Eve quickly escalated into a blatant crush on her partner, which often becomes the subject of comedic and intimate scenes in the story.
Amane Shinjō (新庄雨音, Shinjō Amane)
Voiced by: Ami Koshimizu
She is Aoi's best friend and her caddie. She has extensive knowledge, whether of psychology, statistics, or meteorology, along with detailed information on rivals and courses that Aoi will be participating in, so as to give her a significant edge.
Lily Lipman (リリィ・リップマン, Rirī Rippuman)
Voiced by: Akira Sekine
She is the friend of Eve, living in the Nafrece slums with her and her sister, Klein. She is energetic, cheerful, and good-hearted. She is often Eve's caddie during her underground golf games.
Reiya Amuro (亜室麗矢, Amuro Reiya)
Voiced by: Tōru Furuya
He is the golf club adviser at Raiho Girls' Academy. There are questions about who he really is until in Season 2, when it is revealed that he is Aoi's father.
Leo Millafoden (レオ・ミラフォーデン, Reo Mirafōden)
Voiced by: Shūichi Ikeda
He is Eve's golf trainer who left her after he had finished teaching her the golf skills she "needed".
Rose Aleon (ローズ・アレオン, Rōzu Areon)
Voiced by: Toa Yukinari
The go-between for Eve and Klein to the mafia underworld. She is also a skilled golfer.
Ichina Saotome (早乙女イチナ, Saotome Ichina)
Voiced by: Saki Fujita
A first-year student at Raiho Academy, with ambitions to become a professional caddie. She is Eve's caddie who can observe all about golf courses.
Kinue Jinguji (神宮寺絹江, Jingūji Kinue)
Voiced by: Mai Nakahara
Team President of the Raiho Golf Team. She is currently on the injured list with an elbow injury.
Mizuho Himekawa (姫川みずほ, Himekawa Mizuho)
Voiced by: Yukari Tamura
A second-year student at Nadanan Sports Academy and the defending Japanese Amateur Champion.
Kaede Oikawa (及川楓, Oikawa Kaede)
Voiced by: Yū Kobayashi
A second-year student at Nadanan Sports Academy and Mizuho Himekawa's doubles partner.
Kaoruko Iijima (飯島薫子, Ījima Kaoruko)
Voiced by: M.A.O
A third-year student at Shizuoka Girls' High School and their golf team's captain. She uses "In the Zone" to play her golf.
Kuyou Iseshiba (伊勢芝九葉, Iseshiba Kuyō)
Voiced by: Satomi Arai
A second-year student at Shizuoka High School and Kaoruko's Doubles Partner. She is known as a golfer by the nickname "Ball Path Tracker".
Vipere (ヴィペール, Vipēru)
Voiced by: Kaori Nazuka
A famous golfer in the underground world who faces off against Eve when hired by Mafia boss Nicholas. She later becomes Eve's friend.
Haruka Misono (実園遥香, Misono Haruka)
Voiced by: Rina Satō
A first-year student at Raiho Academy who aspires to make the first team. She wants Ichina to caddie for her.
Seira Amawashi (天鷲世良, Amawashi Seira)
Voiced by: Yūko Kaida
CEO of the Amawashi Group and Athena Golf Brands. She is also Aoi's mother.
Klein Clara (クライン・クラーラ, Kurain Kurāra)
Voiced by: Sayaka Kinoshita
The sister of Lily and owner of the illegal shop where she, Eve, and Lily are living along with her three orphan immigrant children. Thanks to Eve and Vipere, she could set up a cafe called The White Hart with Lily and send her children to school.

== Production and release ==
The original anime series was announced on October 28, 2021. It was produced by BN Pictures and directed by Takayuki Inagaki, with scripts written by Yōsuke Kuroda, and music composed by Kōtarō Nakagawa and Hironori Anazawa. The series aired from April 6 to June 29, 2022, on TV Tokyo and other networks. (Note: TV Tokyo listed the series premiere at 24:00 JST on April 5, 2022, which is effectively April 6 at midnight.) Crunchyroll streamed the series. Medialink licensed it in Southeast Asia and Oceania minus Australia and New Zealand; they streamed it on their Ani-One YouTube channel and Bilibili. On May 24, 2022, Bandai Namco teamed up with Jack Bunny!! to recreate and market the golf clothes used by Eve and Aoi in the ED sequence.

Following the conclusion of the series, a second season was announced to be in production. It was initially set to premiere in January 2023, but was later delayed. The second season aired from April 8 to June 24, 2023. (Note: TV Tokyo listed the season premiere at 25:23 on April 7, 2023, which is effectively April 8 at 1:23 a.m.) The opening theme song for both seasons is "Venus Line" by Kohmi Hirose. For the first season, the ending theme song is "Yodaka" (ヨダカ) by Tsukuyomi. For the second season, the ending theme song is "Kimi ga Iru kara" (君がいるから; "Since You're Here") by Sarasa Kadowaki.

=== Episode list ===
==== Season 1 ====
No. overall	No. in season	Title (Note: All English titles are taken from Crunchyroll.)	Directed by (Note: Information is taken from the ending credits of each episode.)	Written by	Storyboarded by	Original release date
1	1	"Rainbow Bullet"; Transliteration: "Reinbō Baretto" (Japanese: レインボー・バレット)	Takayuki Inagaki, Ayaka Tsujihashi	Yōsuke Kuroda	Takayuki Inagaki	April 6, 2022
Eve lives in a slum dwelling in Nafrece and earns money from underground golf tournaments to help her friends. She has unique abilities that allow her to have powerful golf strikes. One day, she meets Aoi Amawashi from Japan and is blown away, a moment that changes her life forever...
2	2	"Innocent Tyrant"; Transliteration: "Mujaki na Bōkun" (Japanese: 無邪気な暴君)	Kōsuke Shimotori	Yōsuke Kuroda	Takayuki Inagaki	April 13, 2022
Aoi and Eve begin a golf match against each other. Although they have different styles, they both appear to be evenly matched. Aoi's caddie, however, believes that Aoi has abilities that no one else can measure up to.
3	3	"A Match Between Just the Two of Us"; Transliteration: "Futari dake no Shiai" (Japanese: 2人だけの試合)	Ayaka Tsujihashi	Yōsuke Kuroda	Takayuki Inagaki	April 20, 2022
Thanks to an agreement with Catherine, who pulls strings to get Eve into the U15 Women's World Championship, she is able to fulfill a promise she made with Aoi. In the meantime, Aoi looks forward to their game, but other forces are at play...
4	4	"Vipère"; Transliteration: "Dokuhebi" (Japanese: 毒蛇)	Yoshito Hata	Yōsuke Kuroda	Takayuki Inagaki	April 27, 2022
The return of Aoi to Japan is fast approaching. She and Eve agree to play a game earlier in the morning together. However, this is complicated when she is drawn into a scheme to repay the debt for her U15 Women's World Championship participation. She faces off with Vipere, a golfer backed by Mafia boss Nicholas. Can she defeat her and meet Aoi at the time they agreed?
5	5	"VR"	Kenta Kushiya, Mitsuto Yamaji	Yōsuke Kuroda	Takayuki Inagaki	May 4, 2022
Aoi cannot get Eve out of her mind, while Eve's underground golf games are stalling in the aftermath of missing her game with Aoi. This all changes when she learns about a virtual reality golf game from Klein and learns that many Japanese people play the game. When she enters the VR game, she meets someone who she is familiar with, a person who has the game's highest score.
6	6	"Rebellion's Cry"; Transliteration: "Hangyaku no Noroshi" (Japanese: 反逆の狼煙)	Kōhei Kuratomi	Yōsuke Kuroda	Takayuki Inagaki	May 11, 2022
The plan to redevelop the slums is going forward, with the impending destruction of Eve's home, which was caused by the betting schemes of Catherine. However, Catherine wants to hire Eve as her exclusive golfer for underground games, which Eve considers since it would be easier to raise money. She dismisses this, after involvement in the criminal underworld will make it harder to fulfill the promise she made with Aoi.
7	7	"Purple (Aoi) Bullet"; Transliteration: "Aoiro no Dangan" (Japanese: 葵色の弾丸)	Hisaya Takabayashi	Yōsuke Kuroda	Takayuki Inagaki	May 18, 2022
Eve faces off against Rose in a golf match for the future of her friends and their home. She has a tough challenge because Rose has a similar style and studied under Leo, just like Eve. While Rose seems ahead, Eve is able to recover, fighting to the last second for what she feels is right.
8	8	"Final Bullet"; Transliteration: "Fainaru Baretto" (Japanese: ファイナル・バレット)	Kōsuke Shimotori	Yōsuke Kuroda	Takayuki Inagaki	May 25, 2022
Eve wins her match against Rose and saves her friends at the last second. With the money they have, they stay at a hotel, then are helped by Vipere who gets them ID cards. Eve learns that the Mafia is ready to kill her, so she leaves Nafrece en route to Japan to play Aoi.
9	9	"Ichina Saotome Wants to Be a Pro Caddy!"; Transliteration: "Saotome Ichina wa Puro Kyadī wo Mezashiteru" (Japanese: 早乙女イチナはプロキャディーを目指してる)	Motoki Nakanishi, Ayaka Tsujihashi	Yōsuke Kuroda	Takayuki Inagaki	June 1, 2022
Eve appears at a golf course near Raiou Academy where she beats Haruka in a golf game and meets aspiring pro caddie Ichina Saotome. While there, she reunites with Aoi who is overjoyed to see her. Later, she enrolls in the academy as a student.
10	10	"Evangeline Is Frightfully Upset"; Transliteration: "Ivuanjerin wa go Rippuku" (Japanese: イヴァンジェリンはご立腹)	Naoyoshi Kusaka	Yōsuke Kuroda	Takayuki Inagaki	June 8, 2022
Eve is frustrated she cannot play a golf game with Aoi while she begins her first day at the academy. Aoi declares that she needs Eve to improve her golf skills. Meanwhile, Eve has fun going to a mall with other students. She later plays a game against fellow students Kanon "Kuyo" Iseshiba and Kaouruko. After she helps her win her golf game, she agrees to have Ichina as her caddie.
11	11	"No Matter How Tall a Weed Grows, It Will Never Reach the Sun"; Transliteration: "Zassō ga Donnani Nobite mo Taiyō ni wa Todokanai" (Japanese: 雑草がどんなに伸びても太陽には届かない)	Harume Kosaka	Yōsuke Kuroda	Takayuki Inagaki	June 15, 2022
Golf Captain Jinguuji takes Eve off for a training session in order to prepare her for the upcoming All-Japan Girls High School Doubles Championship, sacrificing her golfing future to ensure Eve can win as Aoi's partner.
12	12	"Are Aoi and Eve Okay Together? The Doubles Championship Begins"; Transliteration: "Aoi to Ivu de Daijōbu? Kaisai, Daburusu Senshuken" (Japanese: 葵とイヴで大丈夫？ 開催、ダブルス選手権)	Ayaka Tsujihashi	Yōsuke Kuroda	Ayaka Tsujihashi	June 22, 2022
The Qualifying Tournaments for the All-Japan Girls High School Doubles Championships have begun, and Eve and Aoi are poised to make a statement to the rest of their competitors that they are ready to battle for the title.
13	13	"I Think Who Gets What Room Is Very Important For Girls"; Transliteration: "Joshi no Heyawari tte Kekkō Daijina Kotoda to Omou no" (Japanese: 女子の部屋割りって結構大事なことだと思うの)	Hisaya Takabayashi	Yōsuke Kuroda	Katsuyuki Kodera	June 29, 2022
The All-Japan Girls High School Double Championships are under way, and both Eve and Aoi are doing well during their matches. However, they and their rivals from Koran and Nadaminami Academies close in on one another to find out who will come out on top.

==== Season 2 ====
No. overall	No. in season	Title	Directed by	Written by	Storyboarded by	Original release date
14	1	"A Certain Truth Sleeping in the Girl's Memories"; Transliteration: "Shōjo no Kioku no Naka ni Nemutteiru Tashikana Shinjitsu" (Japanese: 少女の記憶の中に眠っている確かな真実)	Seo Hye-Jin	Yōsuke Kuroda	Katsuyuki Kodera	April 8, 2023 (Note: The episode had an advanced screening on December 25, 2022.)
Eve and Aoi go up against Kaoruko and Kuyou in the semifinal match, and both pair of teams end up in a tie after every hole up until the 18th hole. During the match play, Kaoruko wants to prove her former coach Amuro wrong by using her ability more times than she can count, despite the consequences coming to her.
15	2	"The Reason Just Playing Golf Makes Me So Happy"; Transliteration: "Tada Gorufu ga Dekiru Toiukoto ga Kore Hodo made ni Kōfukuna Riyū" (Japanese: ただゴルフができるということがこれほどまでに幸福な理由)	Kōsuke Shimotori	Yōsuke Kuroda	Takayuki Inagaki	April 15, 2023
The final match between the team of Eve and Aoi and the team of Mizuho and Kaede take a shocking turn of events. During Eve's Rainbow Shot, the truth is revealed as Eve found out who her parents really were, shocking Aoi in a process.
16	3	"The Strange Fates of Two Generations of Young People Who Were Caught Up in The Ego of Adults"; Transliteration: "Otona no Ego ni Makikomareta Wakamonotachi no Nidai ni Wataru Sūkina Unmei" (Japanese: 大人のエゴに巻き込まれた若者たちの二代に渡る数奇な運命)	Yoshito Hata	Yōsuke Kuroda	Takayuki Inagaki	April 22, 2023
The All-Japan Girls High School Doubles Championship has come to an end, and both Eve and Aoi have won and become champions. But, things are getting worse as they find out that they both have the same father but different mothers, as explained in a flashback 20 years ago.
17	4	"The Girl Who Regained Her Lost Memories Returns Home and Learns a New Truth"; Transliteration: "Ushinatta Kioku o Torimodoshita Shōjo wa, Kokyō ni Modotte Aratana Shinjitsu o Shiru" (Japanese: 失った記憶を取り戻した少女は、故郷に戻って新たな真実を知る)	Naoyoshi Kusaka	Yōsuke Kuroda	Takayuki Inagaki	April 29, 2023
Eve is deported from Japan to Nafrece, who then visits the grave of Eleanor, her mother. There, she meets her mother's butler who knows more about her during the time he served her. Afterwards, Eve challenges a pro golfer who is ranked eight in the European Tour.
18	5	"A Farewell to Lies"; Transliteration: "Itsuwari to no Ketsubetsu" (Japanese: 偽りとの決別)	Ayaka Tsujihashi	Yōsuke Kuroda	Ayaka Tsujihashi	May 6, 2023
Ichina withdraws from Raiho Girls' Academy in order to travel to Nafrece and become Eve's caddie once again. Upon her arrival, however, Ichina soon learns that Eve is involved with the mafia and Eve's fate will be determined during her upcoming underground golf match.
19	6	"Shining Wings"; Transliteration: "Kagayakeru Tsubasa" (Japanese: 輝ける翼)	Harume Kosaka	Yōsuke Kuroda	Tsuyoshi Kimura	May 13, 2023
The Japan Women's Pro Tour is underway, but Aoi is struggling after realizing that Reiya may be her real father. However, as Reiya recovers, Aoi learns her new golf skill that rivals Eve's and puts Aoi back in the game.
20	7	"The Rainbow That Tells of Victory"; Transliteration: "Shōri o Tsugeru Niji" (Japanese: 勝利を告げる虹)	Shigeki Awai	Yōsuke Kuroda	Takayuki Inagaki	May 20, 2023 (Note: This episode aired at 12:10 a.m. JST, 10 minutes after the original air time on TV Tokyo.)
The Japan Women's Pro Tour has ended with Aoi catching up to Reika and winning first place on the last day. Aoi is now a pro golfer, but Amane wants to keep tagging along with her in the next Pro Tour. Meanwhile, Eve encounters her former master Leo and his new student Aisha for the upcoming European Women's Pro Tour.
21	8	"Rainbow and Bullet"; Transliteration: "Niji to Dangan" (Japanese: 虹と弾丸)	Hisaya Takabayashi	Yōsuke Kuroda	Katsuyuki Kodera	May 27, 2023 (Note: This episode aired at 3:09 a.m. JST, 2 hours and 46 minutes after the original air time on TV Tokyo.)
The Europe Women's Pro Tour is under way, but Eve is struggling on every hole despite using her usual skills. The next day, however, she combines her former master Leo's skill and her late father Kazuhiko's skill to get her back on top, in hopes to defeat Aisha and win the tournament.
22	9	"Over the Rainbow"; Transliteration: "Obā za Reinbō" (Japanese: オーバー・ザ・レインボー)	Kōsuke Shimotori	Yōsuke Kuroda	Kōsuke Shimotori	June 3, 2023
Eve is in danger thanks to the overreliance of her new skill. However, she refuses to withdraw from the tournament and competes on the last day. Despite the warning she was given, Eve unleashes her ultimate skill that not even Leo can do.
23	10	"To Make Dreams Come True"; Transliteration: "Yume o Kanaeru Tame ni" (Japanese: 夢を叶えるために)	Seo Hye-Jin	Yōsuke Kuroda	Takayuki Inagaki	June 10, 2023
Eve wins the Europe Women's Pro Tour, but then she collapses and is unable to golf until she completely recovers from her injuries. Meanwhile, after Aoi suffers another collapse, she learns she has her father Reiya's illness and she may never golf again. Amane is able to get Aoi back in the game so the latter can challenge Eve to one final golf tournament: The British Women's Masters Tour.
24	11	"Promise"; Transliteration: "Yakusoku" (Japanese: 約束)	Ayaka Tsujihashi	Yōsuke Kuroda	Takayuki Inagaki	June 17, 2023
The British Women's Masters Tour has begun in a three-way crossfire between Eve, Aoi, and their new opponent Juha Hamilail. During the tournament, Aoi is in the lead while Eve is trying to catch up to her. However, an unfortunate event is bound to happen to Aoi.
25	12	"The Promise Revives"; Transliteration: "Yomigaeru Yakusoku" (Japanese: 蘇る約束)	Takayuki Inagaki	Yōsuke Kuroda	Takayuki Inagaki	June 24, 2023
With Aoi forfeit from the tournament, she ends up as Eve's caddie for the final day of the British Women's Masters Tour, despite the fact that Eve's involvement with the mafia was exposed to the media, putting Eve's golf career in serious danger. Nonetheless, the final showdown between Eve and Juha comes to a huge climax.

=== Video game ===
An eponymously-titled sports video game developed by Viverse and WOWWOW Technology was announced in April 2023. It was released on June 15 of the same year for the Nintendo Switch. A mobile game and virtual reality experiences based on the series are also planned to be released in the future.

== Reception ==
=== Critical response ===
The series received generally positive reviews. Briana Lawrence of The Mary Sue called the series "delightfully bonkers" and predicted future episodes would expand its "wacky, sapphic vibe". She later described the series as a "fantastically campy golf (love) story". Yuricon founder Erica Friedman argued that the series is similar to isekai like I'm in Love with the Villainess and argued it flouts the rules of the sports anime genre. She also called it a "delightful romp" with openly yuri themes and said it is close to becoming the "greatest Yuri sports anime of all time".

Alex Henderson of Anime Feminist, reviewing the first episode, criticized the series for its "questionable tropes" and tackling "touchy subjects with [fairly] wild abandon" but still argued it is entertaining and the most fun they "ever had watching golf". Vrai Kaiser of the same publication, reviewing the first four episodes, argued that the show's "extreme sports angle" wasn't as strong as it could be, and described the show as "flashy" and "weird" but said that the rivalry between Eve and Aoi gave the series "an unexpectedly solid core".

Reviewers for Anime News Network were more positive. They stated that they either loved the series, said it was cool with an "utterly ridiculous premise", were invested in seeing where the Aoi/Eve relationship went, described it as the best sports anime of the season, or otherwise praised the series. Nicholas Dupree and Steve Jones, writing for the same publication, said, in the This Week in Anime chatlog, that the series had a compelling angle when it came to the "rivalry/romance between Eve and Aoi" and praised the opening sequence.

ANN reviewer Farris also noted the "memeable" nature of the series, while reviewer Jairus Taylor, of the same site, said this series compensated for golf not being exciting to watch by being "as flashy and over the top as possible with their presentation," in contrast to Oi! Tonbo season 1, which was said to "overly technical." ANN reviewer Richard Eisenbeis described the series as a "sapphic-charged golf anime" which turned golf "into an extreme sport with high-stakes mob gambling" while James Beckett said it made golf "absolutely batshit insane...and...incredibly gay" and Caitlin Moore said that the series mix of mafia and stunt shots were "approximately equivalent to KISS-theming and black lights." All three contrasted it to Sorairo Utility, which they said was based more in "the real world" but is still "pretty darned charming...and...incredibly gay" and is a "straightforward anime about girls playing golf."

=== Influence and legacy ===
In March 2024, reviewers Christopher Farris and Steve Jones, of Anime News Network, discussed whether the premiere of anime such as Sorairo Utility, Rising Impact, Oi! Tonbo, later in 2024, is the result of Birdie Wing causing a "golf anime renaissance" while comparing the series to Haikyu!!, Robot × LaserBeam, Chihayafuru, and Nobuyuki Fukumoto's Nikaido Hell Golf, and PuraOre! Pride of Orange. The characters from Birdie Wing later had a crossover mini-anime with those from Sorairo Utility, which began in February 2025. Producer Masakazu Kubo of Tonbo later compared Tonbo to Birdie Wing, saying that the former series has "name-brand golf gear is pulled from reality as often as possible."

=== Accolades ===
At the Anime Trending Awards, Birdie Wing: Golf Girls' Story was nominated for both Sports Anime of the Year and Best in Original Screenplay (Yōsuke Kuroda) in 2023 and 2024. The series was also nominated for Best Original Anime in two consecutive years at the Crunchyroll Anime Awards.
