= List of Mob Psycho 100 characters =

This is a list of characters for the manga series Mob Psycho 100.

== Main characters ==
Shigeo Kageyama (影山 茂夫, Kageyama Shigeo) / Mob (モブ, Mobu)
Voiced by: Setsuo Itō (Japanese); Kyle McCarley (seasons 1–2), Jason Liebrecht (season 3) (English)
Portrayed by: Tatsuomi Hamada
Mob is an eighth grade Esper with powerful psychic abilities. His bowl-cut hairstyle is his defining physical feature. He is not good at understanding social cues, and since childhood has rarely displayed intense emotion, typically having a dull expression on his face. He thinks his power is unnecessary in his life, so he avoids using it. He suppresses his emotions to keep his power in control, but when the percentage of his accumulated feelings reaches 100, he is overcome by the strongest emotion he is currently feeling and unleashes the full extent of his powers. He works at Reigen's spirit counsel for 300 yen an hour. When pushed beyond his limits, Mob enters an extremely powerful unconscious state, represented by an emotional meter percentage of ???.
Arataka Reigen (霊幻 新隆, Reigen Arataka)
Voiced by: Takahiro Sakurai (Japanese); Chris Niosi (English)
Portrayed by: Kazuki Namioka
A self-proclaimed spirit medium and Mob's mentor, Reigen runs a low-cost psychic consultation business called "Spirits and Such". He lacks actual psychic abilities and is essentially a con artist, using his intelligence and charisma to solve his clients' problems with skills he calls "secret techniques". Though he tends to put his own self-interest first, Reigen seems to genuinely care for Mob, and has made him promise never to use his powers against other people. Later chapters reveal he stayed in his unprofitable business due to Mob reaching out to him with his support.
Dimple (エクボ, Ekubo)
Voiced by: Akio Ōtsuka (Japanese); Michael Sorich (English)
A deceptive upper-class evil spirit with red circles on his cheeks who can unleash the full potential of whatever body he possesses. However, he is unable to possess powerful psychics without permission, and cannot take full control of the psychic's body. He has also shown the ability to hypnotize or influence large groups of people. He initially possessed a man to establish a cult called LOL to make himself into a god, but was defeated by Mob and lost most of his spiritual capabilities. After being defeated by Mob, hangs around him with the stated intent of taking over his body, but eventually finding himself to legitimately care for the child, aiding him as a member of Spirits and Such.
Ritsu Kageyama (影山 律, Kageyama Ritsu)
Voiced by: Miyu Irino (Japanese); Max Mittelman (English)
Portrayed by: Ayumu Mochizuki
Mob's younger brother, a seventh grade student with good looks who is an ace student and member of the Student Council. Ritsu has had an inferiority complex towards Mob's powers, though he is able to hide his obsessive longing for psychic power of his own. He acts overly protective towards Mob, aiming to prevent him from lashing out with his power. Ritsu eventually develops his own psychic powers and becomes a fairly powerful Esper, initially using Dimple to hone his abilities.
Teruki Hanazawa (花沢 輝気, Hanazawa Teruki)
Voiced by: Yoshitsugu Matsuoka (Japanese); Erik Scott Kimerer (English)
Portrayed by: Atsushi Arai
Black Vinegar Middle School's "ura banchou" ("hidden boss"), known to most as Teru. Also a powerful Esper, he originally held scorn for people without psychic power, calling them "commoners." He is accustomed to using his power freely in daily life, be it exams or sports, and he excels at it all. Coupled with his handsome looks, he is very popular. After he is lectured and defeated by Mob for his arrogance and for using his powers against others, his perspective on psychic power changes, and he becomes friendlier to those around him.
Shou Suzuki (鈴木 将, Suzuki Shō)
Voiced by: Sachi Kokuryu (Japanese); Casey Mongillo (English)
The son of Claw's leader Touichirou Suzuki, assumed to be a member of the organization before revealing himself as opposing his father. He has been scouting for potential psychics captured by Claw to help him. Like his father, Shou is also an extremely powerful esper. Of the rest of the main cast, he is closest friends with Ritsu.
Tome Kurata (暗田 トメ, Kurata Tome)
Voiced by: Atsumi Tanezaki (Japanese); Cherami Leigh (English)
Portrayed by: Kasumi Yamaya
The founder and president of the Telepathy Club (脳感電波部, Nōkandenpabu), a now-disbanded club that the Body Improvement Club lets use their club room. Despite her clubmates preferring to be lazy, Tome is genuinely passionate about telepathy with aspirations of making contact with aliens. She becomes one of Mob's good friends.

== Claw ==
Claw (爪, Tsume) is a criminal organization composed of many Espers, gathering others with psychic powers for their scheme to achieve world domination. The Super 5 (5超, Gochō) serve as the right hands of their group's leader Touichirou Suzuki with their top agents referred to as the Scars (傷, Kizu), named for the wound inflicted on them when they defied and/or challenged Touichirou.

Touichirou Suzuki (鈴木 統一郎, Suzuki Touichirou)
Voiced by: Kazuhiko Inoue (Japanese); Kyle Hebert (English)
The leader of Claw, Touichiro is a ruthless and cunning man who founded Claw for the sole purpose of world domination and uses everyone he can to achieve this goal. Being an incredibly powerful psychic on par with Mob, he aims to put the rest of humanity under his thumb. He also seeks to find his ex-wife who left him many years ago.

=== Ultimate 5 ===
Katsuya Serizawa (芹沢 克也, Serizawa Katsuya)
Voiced by: Takanori Hoshino (Japanese); Edward Bosco (English)
An extremely powerful Esper and Touichiro's personal bodyguard. He originally was a hikikomori who never left his room out of fear of his uncontrollable psychic powers. Touichiro visits Serizawa and gives him an umbrella, telling him that staying under this umbrella will protect him from the outside world; this umbrella eventually becomes his main weapon and method of channeling his powers when working for Claw. When fighting the Ultimate 5, Mob talks with Serizawa about both of them fearing losing control of their powers. After the World Domination arc, he begins working at Spirits and Such Consultation as one of Reigen's employees.
Ryo Shimazaki (島崎 亮, Shimazaki Ryō)
Voiced by: Noriaki Sugiyama (Japanese); Grant George (English)
A member of the Ultimate 5 who has his eyes closed most of the time. Shimazaki's abilities include teleportation and predicting people's movements. His trump card is Mind's Eye, which is one of the few times his eyes open, showing a red iris and a black sclera. This gives him a boost in power and the ability to detect psychic auras. He defended Claw's main base during Claw's world domination and fought Ritsu, Teru and some of the 7th Division Scars. Mob elects not to fight him as his powers are too strong. He is eventually defeated by Reigen, who he could not detect due to Reigen's lack of psychic powers.
Toshiki Minegishi (峯岸 棯樹, Minegishi Toshiki)
Voiced by: Yūsuke Kobayashi (Japanese); Khoi Dao (English)
A powerful Esper whose specialty is using plants. He assisted in Claw's world domination, and fought Mob and Matsuo until he was defeated by Mogami. After the World Domination arc he becomes a florist.
Hiroshi Shibata (柴田 宏, Shibata Hiroshi)
Voiced by: Kenta Miyake (Japanese); Imari Williams (English)
A muscular, physically imposing Esper who uses psychic powers to increase his strength. He is one of the only espers known to be somewhat invulnerable to Sakurai's cursed spray; the spray knocks him out, yet he gets back up while unconscious in a sort of berserker rage. He fought and defeated the Body Improvement Club and Dimple inhabiting Mob's unconscious body, but was defeated by Mob when he regained consciousness.
Nozomu Hatori (羽鳥 希, Hatori Nozomu)
Voiced by: Daiki Hamano (Japanese); Chris Hackney (English)
A man with glasses who uses his psychic powers to manipulate technology and also uses telekinesis. He participated in Claw's world domination plot, and is the first of the Ultimate 5 to be defeated, in this case by Suzuki Shou. He returns in the anime's third season as a telekinetic helicopter pilot, but does not return in the manga.

=== 7th Division ===
The 7th Division of Claw is run by a sub-group called the Scars. Each Scar has a scar somewhere on their body, displaying the fact that they have all battled with Claw's mysterious boss, later revealed to be Suzuki Touichiro, and lost. Although the Scars are more powerful espers compared to the average mass-produced Claw esper, Shimazaki calls them "failures" and "damaged goods." The 7th Division has 11 Scars.

Ishiguro (遺志黒)
Voiced by: Hiroshi Iwasaki, Rumi Okubo (Masked) (Japanese); Mike McFarland, Cristina Vee (Masked) (English)
A Scar who is the leader of Claw's 7th Division. He is a diminutive old man who hides his heavily scarred face in a black bodysuit with a gas mask, which has a built-in voice changer that makes his voice sound like a young girl. A firm believer that his psychic power to manipulate gravity makes him superior, Ishiguro's arrogance makes him prone to childish temperament to the point of being murderous. After losing to Reigen with his remaining followers renouncing Claw, Ishiguro ends up being dispatched by Shou when he attempts to kill everyone.
Yusuke Sakurai (桜威 遊介, Sakurai Yūsuke)
Voiced by: Yoshimasa Hosoya (Japanese); Xander Mobus (English)
A Scar who wears glasses. He has a scar on his left cheek. His fighting abilities are using his sword Jugan, his gun Jugan Air Gun, and his cologne which causes extreme drowsiness. Although all of his weapons are revealed to be toys, they are all enhanced with curses Sakurai regularly places on them. He reveals his backstory to Reigen while fighting him, saying that he was abandoned by his parents as a kid and was bullied in his orphanage. He wished to escape society, which led him to join Claw. Sakurai is later defeated by Reigen. After his defeat, Sakurai gets a normal job working at a convenience store alongside Koyama, which he leaves to help Mob fight Touichiro during the World Domination arc.
Megumu Koyama (誇山 恵, Koyama Megumu)
Voiced by: Shin-ichiro Miki (Japanese); Keith Silverstein (English)
A hot-headed Scar who has a diagonal scar across his face. Koyama is muscular and sports a mohawk and several facial piercings. His fighting abilities consist of Telekinetic Helix, a move in which he wraps a helix of psychic energy around his arms, and Energy Bomb, a move in which he rushes an enemy with a punch supplemented by a strong burst of energy. He had a mission to retrieve Mob, and finds Ritsu who is mistakenly believed to be Mob. Before trying to kidnap Ritsu, Mob fights Koyama, beats him up, but Mob ends up using 100% and he runs away because he is too powerful. Koyama then faces Mob again, but then gets defeated immediately. He sided with Claw, but then he fights against Claw after the 7th Division got dissolved. He helped in the fight against Claw when they attempt world domination.
Matsuo (魔津尾)
Voiced by: Ryūnosuke Watanuki (Japanese); Greg Chun (English)
Matsuo is a Scar of the 7th Division with a scar through his right eye. He is able to capture evil spirits in a cursed jar and use them under his command; his most powerful spirit, named Candy, is housed within the same jar. Matsuo captures Dimple within this jar, which ultimately leads to his downfall as Dimple eats many of the spirits held inside. Matsuo is defeated, but later returns to help Reigen, Mob, and Dimple fight Mogami without being noticed. Matsuo then captures Mogami within his spirit jar until the malevolent spirit is accidentally released during the World Domination arc.
Muraki (邑機)
Voiced by: Satoshi Tsuruoka (Japanese); Chris Tergliafera (English)
A bald Scar with a scar across his scalp. His psychic power, known as Ethereal Body Technique, allows him to create clones. He fought for the 7th Division until Reigen convinced him to resign and leave Claw. He returns to fight Claw during the World Domination arc.
Miyagawa (宮蛾輪)
Voiced by: Anri Katsu (Japanese); Benjamin Diskin (English)
An energetic Scar who has a scar on the right side of his forehead. His specialty is pyrokinesis. He attempted to kill Teruki with his pyrokinesis until Teruki turned his own technique against him, leading to his defeat.
Takeuchi (嶽内)
Voiced by: Junichi Yanagita (Japanese); Kyle Hebert (English)
A Scar with a scar on his forehead. Takeuchi can use special qi abilities. He left Claw after the 7th Division dissolved, and returned to fight Claw during the World Domination arc.
Tsuchiya (槌屋)
Voiced by: Yuko Hara (Japanese); Erica Lindbeck (English)
A Scar with a scar under her right eye. Tsuchiya has strong muscles and uses her powers to increase the strength of her arms. She left Claw after the 7th Division dissolved, and returned to fight Claw during the World Domination arc.
Mukai (無飼)
Voiced by: Chiaki Omigawa (Japanese); Ryan Bartley (English)
A Scar and a small child with a scar on her left cheek. Mukai specialises in telepathically using life-size wooden mannequins, which she calls her "dolls," to fight enemies. She left Claw after the 7th Division dissolved, and returned to fight Claw during the World Domination arc.
Terada (寺蛇)
Voiced by: Fumihiko Tachiki (Japanese); Jake Eberle (English)
A Scar with a long, horizontal scar on his nose. Terada's ability is using his telekinetic powers to make whips from his hands simple called Air Whips, which have a range of sixty meters. After defeating him in battle, Teruki picked up this ability. He left Claw after the 7th Division dissolved, and returned to fight Claw during the World Domination arc.
Muto (霧藤, Mutō)
Voiced by: Daisuke Kirii (Japanese); Patrick Seitz (English)
A Scar with an unusually long chin, which contains his scar. His ability is to traumatize people with hallucinations of their worst fears. He fought for the 7th Division, and tried to kill Mob with his powers, but was defeated when his induced hallucinations caused Mob to go 100%.

== Supporting characters ==
Tenga Onigawara (鬼瓦 天牙, Onigawara Tenga)
Voiced by: Yoshimasa Hosoya (Japanese); Ray Chase (English)
A delinquent at Salt Middle School with a short temper. After Mob's destruction of Black Vinegar Middle school, Onigawara inadvertently started the "White T-Poison" rumor. He later becomes a member of the Body Improvement Club after Shinji Kamuro frames him and turns his class against him, and he decides to better himself as a person.
Ichi Mezato (米里 イチ, Mezato Ichi)
Voiced by: Ayumi Fujimura (Japanese); Abby Trott (English)
A member of Salt Middle School's Journalism Club who met Mob while investigating the LOL cult. She developed an interest in his psychic abilities and helped found the Psycho Helmet Cult.
Tsubomi Takane (高嶺 ツボミ, Takane Tsubomi)
Voiced by: Uki Satake (Japanese); Ryan Bartley (English)
Portrayed by: Yūki Yoda
Tsubomi is Mob's childhood friend and his crush. She values hard work and effort over natural talent and is one of few who truly doesn't care about Mob's psychic ability. Because of her indifference towards his powers, she influenced Mob's decision to not depend on his powers, as well as the decision to join the Body Improvement Club.
Musashi Goda (郷田 武蔵, Gōda Musashi)
Voiced by: Toshihiko Seki (Japanese); Patrick Seitz (English)
The founder and president of the Body Improvement Club (肉体改造部, Nikutaikaizōbu), a fitness-based club that took over the club room once held by the Telepathy Club. Raised on a farm, Musashi is kind-hearted with a strong sense of justice who only resorts to fighting when left with no choice.
Keiji Mogami (最上 啓示, Mogami Keiji)
Voiced by: Akira Ishida (Japanese); Sean Chiplock (English)
A former psychic who was once dubbed "The Greatest Psychic of the 20th Century", he began working as an assassin to help his ill mother. When she came back as an evil spirit and blamed her death on her son, Mogami committed suicide and became a spirit. After his defeat by Mob, Mogami returns during the Claw World Domination arc and defeats Minegishi.

=== Mitsuura Group ===
The Mitsuura Group are a group of espers with basic or weak psychic abilities who are studied with the intent of granting psychic powers to the entirety of society. The group disbands after the Claw World Domination arc, although they remain friends.

Kenji Mitsuura (密裏 賢治, Mitsūra Kenji)
Voiced by: Shinya Fukumatsu (Japanese); Chris Cason (English)
Portrayed by: Yuki Kubota
The leader of the Mitsuura Group who doesn't have psychic powers and wished to make artificial psychic powers for all of society to use, he then disbands the group after he was convinced by Rei, Daichi and Kaito that people might misuse their abilities when the project succeeds.
Takeshi Hoshino (星野 武史, Hoshino Takeshi)
Voiced by: Kōhei Amasaki (Japanese); Chris Hackney (English)
A member who is able to use telekinesis. He doesn't like it when called weak. His abilities were only strong enough to simply bend spoons with full efforts, until being under Teruki's training, Takeshi's telekinesis became stronger.
Rei Kurosaki (黒崎 麗, Kurosaki Rei)
Voiced by: Sanae Fuku (Japanese); Mela Lee (English)
Portrayed by: Akane Sakanoue
A member who is able to use clairvoyance. She had a crush on Ritsu and Teru. Her efficiency was 67%, but after being under Teruki's training, her accuracy improved.
Go Asahi (朝日 豪, Asahi Gō)
Voiced by: Yusuke Kuwahata (Japanese); Bobby Thong (English)
A member who is able to use pyrokinesis. He at first could barely make a small flame, but then gets much stronger under Teruki's training.
Daichi Shiratori (白鳥 大地, Shiratori Daichi)
Voiced by: Hiroyuki Kagura (Japanese); Tom Bauer (English)
Portrayed by: Akihisa Shiono
A member who is able to use telepathy and is Kaito's brother. He first could only communicate with his brother, but then became able to use telepathy on anyone after Teruki trained him.
Kaito Shiratori (白鳥 海斗, Shiratori Kaito)
Voiced by: Hiroyuki Kagura (Japanese); Tom Bauer (English)
Portrayed by: Kohei Fukuyama
A member who is able to use telepathy and is Daichi's brother. He first could only communicate with his brother, but then became able to use telepathy on anyone after Teruki trained him.
