= Vinland Saga season 2 =

2023 Japanese television season

Vinland Saga
- Season 2
- Cover art for the first home media volume of the season, featuring Thorfinn
- No. of episodes: 24

Release
- Original network: Tokyo MX, BS11, GBS
- Original release: January 10 – June 20, 2023

Season chronology
- ← Previous; Season 1

The second season of the Vinland Saga anime television series is produced by MAPPA and is based on the manga series Vinland Saga by Makoto Yukimura. Despite the studio change, the series retained its main production staff from the previous season. The series is directed by Shūhei Yabuta, with Hiroshi Seko handling series composition, Takahiko Abiru designing the characters and Yutaka Yamada composing the music. Taking place a year after the events of the first season, the season primarily focuses on a slave from England named Einar as he meets the protagonist, Thorfinn, while working in a farm.

In July 2021, Twin Engine announced that a second season of the series was in production. Shūhei Yabuta is returning as director, and Takahiko Abiru is returning as character designer. In May 2022, it was announced that MAPPA would be taking over as the production studio for the second season. It aired from January 10 to June 20, 2023, on Tokyo MX, BS11, and GBS. (Note: Tokyo MX lists the series premiere at 24:30 on January 9, 2023, which is effectively 12:30 a.m. JST on January 10.) The season ran for 24 episodes. For the home media releases, the episodes were divided into two DVD and Blu-ray volumes to be released on June 21, 2023, and August 23, 2023.

The first half of the season features "River" by Anonymouz as the opening theme, while the ending theme is "Without Love" by LMYK. The second half of the season uses "Paradox" by Survive Said the Prophet as the opening theme and "Ember" by haju:harmonics as the ending theme.

== Episodes ==
No. overall	No. in season	Title (Note: The first set of English translated titles are taken from Netflix and the official anime website.) (Note: The second set of English translated titles are taken from Crunchyroll. For episodes where there are none, the first set is used.)	Directed by	Written by	Original release date
25	1	"Slave"; Transliteration: "Dorei" (Japanese: 奴隷)	Nobuyoshi Arai, Yōsuke Yamamoto	Hiroshi Seko	January 10, 2023
Vikings attack a village in Northern England where Einar, his mother and sister Lotta live a peaceful farming life. They escape into the woods, but Einar's mother is shot and killed by an arrow. When Lotta strikes back at a captor, she too is cut down and killed. Einar is taken to Denmark along with other prisoners to be sold as slaves. He briefly escapes, but is recaptured and brutally beaten, and eventually resigns himself to his fate. He is bought by Ketil, a major landowner, to work on his large farm in southern Denmark. Upon arriving there, Einar meets another of Ketil's slaves: Thorfinn.
26	2	"Ketil's Farm"; Transliteration: "Ketiru no Nōjō" (Japanese: ケティルの農場)	Michiru Itabisashi	Hiroshi Seko	January 17, 2023
Ketil assigns Einar and Thorfinn to work together to clear a forest and plant and harvest grain for which he offers to buy at a fair price. If they work hard, he suggests that they can buy their freedom. However, Einar finds the reality is that they work hard, get little food to eat and are exploited by Ketil's retainers. Thorfinn communicates little, and his spirit appears completely broken. They also help the other workers with the wheat harvest, including Ketil, however Ketil's spoilt 17-year-old son Olmar hates farm work and has visions of being a warrior, of joining Canute's army and sailing to England. Einar rails against senseless war and violence which begins to stir some emotions in Thorfinn.
27	3	"Snake"; Transliteration: "Hebi" (Japanese: 蛇)	Yōji Satō	Hiroshi Seko	January 24, 2023
Olmar joins the bodyguards, Fox and Badger, in a late-night drinking session, but realizes how inexperienced he is. Fox suggests to Olmar that if kills someone that will increase his confidence and reduce his fears, suggesting one of the expendable farm slaves. The next morning Thorfinn is woken by a terrifying dream which he cannot remember, and at the well, Einar meets the young woman Arnheid who explains she is Ketil's personal attendant. Fox and Badger arrive and take Thorfinn and Einar to the bodyguard's compound where Olmar is invited to kill the unarmed Einar. In desperation and anger, Einar rushes at Olmar and pins him down, telling Thorfinn to run. As they struggle Thorfinn offers himself up as a sacrifice. However, Fox says death has no value without fear and tries to frighten Thorfinn by slashing him repeatedly with his sword, but Thorfinn does not even flinch. Snake, boss of the bodyguards, arrives and stops Fox, punching him severely in the face and demanding that Badger explain the situation.
28	4	"Awakening"; Transliteration: "Mezame" (Japanese: 目覚め)	Yōji Satō	Hiroshi Seko	January 31, 2023
After Snake reprimands his men for mistreating the slaves, he introduces himself to Thorfinn. He suddenly draws his sword, but this time Thorfinn reacts and blocks Snake with a powerful kick, revealing that he still has a will to live. Arnheid tells Pater about the incident, and he treats Thorfinn's wounds, but Thorfinn immediately heads back into the woods to continue tree felling. When Einar asks if he has been to war, Thorfinn replies he has been at war since he was a child, and killed more people than he can remember. That night, Einar wakes in a rage from his pent-up hatred of warriors and begins to choke Thorfinn who at the same time is having a nightmare in which he is fighting demons who are trying to kill him. Einar stops choking Thorfinn who wakes screaming with the memories of what he has done in his past and thanks Einar for waking him, but Einar berates him for what he sees as a selfish nihilistic attitude and they both try to go back to sleep. A final scene shows a white-haired ruler visiting a battlefield graveyard in the moonlight.
29	5	"The Path of Blood" / "Path of Blood"; Transliteration: "Chi no Michi" (Japanese: 血の道)	Shigeru Fukase	Hiroshi Seko	February 7, 2023
As King Canute marches ahead of his troops in the war against Ethelred II for the throne of England, he recalls the time when Askeladd killed King Sweyn, making Canute the new king of Denmark. He severely punishes some of his forward troops for pillaging and treating the English peasants badly. Canute greets Floki on his way to accept the surrender of Earl Eadric of Mercia when Thorkell appears, angry at not being allowed to sever Eadric's head, but Thorkell defers to Canute's strategy. Eadric offers Canute treasure to leave him and Mercia alone, however Canute rejects the paltry offer and demands that Eadric swear loyalty to him and deliver Ethelred's head in exchange for retaining Mecia. Canute then sets alight a series of massive pyres across the countryside to demonstrate his power. Both Ethelred and his son Edmund are dead within 3 years leading Canute to being recognized in 1018 as Bretwalda, King of England.
30	6	"I Want a Horse" / "We Need a Horse"; Transliteration: "Uma ga Hoshii" (Japanese: 馬が欲しい)	Kento Matsui	Hiroshi Seko	February 14, 2023
Einar and Thorfinn continue their back-breaking work to clear their plot of land and realize that they need a horse to more efficiently clear the stumps and plow the land. Their requests for a horse are rejected by the retainers, however Sverkel an old farmer offers to loan them one, but in exchange they have to do chores around his farm. Einar sometimes suspects that they are still being exploited, however the horse enables them to clear the stumps more quickly. One day, after some retainers accuse them of stealing the horse, they discover that Sverkel is Ketil's father. As winter approaches, Sverkel also lends them a plow to till the soil and one day they discover that Snake lives at his farmhouse and cares for the old man in his own way. Snake believes that the huge farm is poorly defended against anyone more than local thieves. Thorfinn gradually develops some respect for farming life and acknowledges Einar as a friend.
31	7	"Iron Fist Ketil"; Transliteration: "Tekken Ketiru" (Japanese: 鉄拳ケティル)	Michiru Itabisashi	Hiroshi Seko	February 21, 2023
As time passes, Einar's friendship with Arnheid grows, Thorfinn's first wheat crop begins to sprout, and they begin growing beards. Einar entreats Thorfinn to pray with him for a successful harvest. Ketil returns to the farm with his oldest son Thorgil who refers to his father as "Iron Fist Ketil" in an attempt to impress Olmar with tales of his father's battlefield exploits. They are met by Snake who has captured two children, Sture and his younger sister Thora, who have been stealing food supplies. Ketil has to decide their punishment and Thorgil suggests amputating one of their arms. Since the family has fallen on hard times Ketil is reluctant to do so and is relieved when Pater suggests they work on the farm to repay the family's debt. However, Ketil is still pressured into beating Sture to teach the children a lesson. Later, as Thorgil and the stewards party into the night, Ketil confesses to Arnheid in bed that he is no hero, fearing war and violence, and even fearing his own son Thorgil.
32	8	"An Empty Man"; Transliteration: "Karappo na Otoko" (Japanese: カラッポな男)	Tadahito Matsubayashi	Hiroshi Seko	February 28, 2023
Thorfinn's terrifying nightmares of his violent past still wake him, but he has trouble recalling what occurred in them. Thorfinn tells Einar about his relationship with Askeladd, although without hate and the need for revenge, he feels empty. As winter approaches, Sverkel teaches them to fish and prompts Thorfinn's thoughts about whether he can change. Meanwhile, some retainers are envious of the success of Einar and Thorfinn's crop, especially for slaves. One day, when they return home, Einar and Thorfinn discover their crop has been uprooted and Einar blames the retainers. Bent on revenge at the wanton destruction, he storms off, but Thorfinn convinces him to tell Pater who promises to investigate himself. Later, when Einar and Thorfinn come across a group of retainers who ridicule their efforts at agriculture, Einar loses his temper. However, Thorfinn throws the first blow, breaking the leader's jaw and a brawl then breaks out. After being hit and knocked down, Thorfinn finds himself falling into the bottomless crevasse of his recurring nightmares.
33	9	"Oath"; Transliteration: "Chikai" (Japanese: 誓い)	Tadahito Matsubayashi	Hiroshi Seko	March 7, 2023
After a drawn-out fight with the retainers over the damaged crop, Einar is still standing, and the retainers decide to withdraw. Thorfinn is unconscious but finds himself hanging by his fingertips above a blood-soaked eternal battlefield where he is confronted by images from his violent past and the countless people he has killed. He sees Askeladd who reminds him not to return to the pointless warrior's life, prompting Thorfinn to break free from the grasping corpses and return to the surface. He regains consciousness to find Einar also suffering from his injuries and Thorfinn swears an oath to reject violence and atone for his past. Meanwhile, Pater presents evidence of the retainer's mischief to Ketil who decides that there will be no retribution against Einar and Thorfinn and declares that the destruction of their crop was caused by wild boars.
34	10	"Cursed Head" / "The Cursed Head"; Transliteration: "Noroi no Kubi" (Japanese: 呪いの首)	Takahiro Kaneko	Hiroshi Seko	March 14, 2023
Three years after they started clearing their allotted land, Einar and Thorfinn have finished. They can now potentially buy their freedom, causing them to contemplate their futures as free men. On his way to the palace in Jelling to visit King Harald, Ketil surprisingly offers the pair their freedom if they are able to till the soil in time sow seeds, and also potential future work as his retainers. Meanwhile, Canute arrives at Jelling to visit his ailing brother Harald and recalls how kind Harald was to him when they were boys. On his deathbed, Harald proclaims Canute as King of Denmark. However, Canute has a vision in the form of the head of King Sweyn who exposes Canute's hidden ambition and accuses him of poisoning his brother Harald so he can be king of Denmark and England.
35	11	"The King and the Sword" / "Kings and Swords"; Transliteration: "Ō to Ken" (Japanese: 王と剣)	Yoho Ishikawa	Hiroshi Seko	March 21, 2023
Canute spars with Wulf, captain of his guard, and manages to defeat him, garnering the necessary respect among his men as a warrior. However, Canute is faced with a shortage of revenue to fund his domains of Denmark and England and considers a plan to requisition farmland from wealthy landowners to fund the military. Ketil arrives in Jelling with a generous tribute for Harald, but learns of his death from Thorgil, and offers it to Canute instead. Meanwhile in the street, Olmar picks a fight with "Bug-Eyes" Thorfinn who Leif Erikson adopted during his search for Thorfinn. Ketil and Leif resolve the incident and Leif becomes convinced that the Thorfinn he is searching for is a slave at Ketil's farm. Ketil is given an audience with Canute, but Olmar rudely interrupts by drawing his sword and asking if the new king will accept him into his guard. Canute asks him to demonstrate his skills by slicing through a roast pig, but Olmar is unable to do it, greatly embarrassing Ketil and Thorgil. Wulf is reluctant to accept the prideful and incompetent Olmar into his guard but acknowledges that he may be a useful piece in the first step of Canute's financial plan, the requisition of Ketil's farm.
36	12	"For the Love that Was Lost" / "For Lost Love"; Transliteration: "Ushinawareta Ai no Tame ni" (Japanese: 失われた愛のために)	Hiromi Nishiyama	Hiroshi Seko	March 28, 2023
Brodd, one of Canute's men, is instructed by a hooded man to tell the depressed Olmar that he had been rejected for the king's guard because of his inability to cut a pig. This provokes Olmar into challenging Brodd to duel in which Olmar is easily beaten. Thorgil arrives and tells Olmar that he must kill or die that day, spurring him to attack Brodd. When Olmar charges, the hooded man flips a coin into Brodd's eye such that Olmar runs him through with his sword and Thorgil then gleefully massacres Brodd's small band. Ketil arrives and is horrified at the slaughter of the king's men, and shortly thereafter the three of them are placed under arrest by Canute's guards. However, Thorgil slaughters the guards and forces the last one to explain why Olmar was allowed to win. He replies it was so that Ketil could be arrested and forfeit his land. Now fugitives, Ketil, Thorgil, and Olmar manage to escape by boat with Leif Erikson, who demands for Thorfinn in exchange. Meanwhile, Canute prepared to march on Ketil's farm with over 100 men including Floki's Jomsvikings.
37	13	"Dark Clouds"; Transliteration: "An'un" (Japanese: 暗雲)	Kōki Aoshima	Hiroshi Seko	April 4, 2023
A slave at Kjallakr's farm on Ketil's estate escapes after killing his master and his sons and setting fire to the farmhouse. He then heads off to find his wife, although suffering from a stab wound. At Sverkel's farm, Einar contemplates his future, possibly with Arnheid. Later, Thorfinn, Einar, and Snake discover that Sverkel has collapsed in the field, and the mistress of Ketil's farm assigns Arnheid to help care for him. Three days later Fox informs Snake of the escaped slave and a reward of three horses for his capture, and Snake advises caution if he is found. Later, Fox, Badger, and Lizard find the slave in the woods, but as they begin arguing loudly about the reward, the slave attacks them, killing Lizard and wounding Badger. Back at the farm, Thorfinn eavesdrops on Snake reading a passage from the Bible about loving one's enemies to a bed-bound and dying Sverkel. They are interrupted when the slave rides by on a stolen horse, pursued by Fox and Badger. While Snake rushes to get his sword, Arnheid recognizes the escapee as her husband, Gardar.
38	14	"Freedom"; Transliteration: "Jiyū" (Japanese: 自由)	Yōji Satō	Hiroshi Seko	April 11, 2023
Gardar asks Arnheid to take their son, Hjalti, and leave with him, but he is confronted by Snake, Fox, and Badger. Snake confronts Gardar, and although Gardar is an accomplished swordsman Snake knocks him out so he can be taken alive for judgement. Einar wants to help Gardar, but Snake warns Einar and Thorfinn not to get involved. He tells Arnheid to forget about Gardar as he is taken away. Later, Einar wants to rescue Gardar, but Arnheid tells them the story of how Gardar and the village men went off to fight over a body of iron ore and while they were gone, the village was raided, the women and children were taken away and she has not seen Hjalti since then. She also explains that she is pregnant with Ketil's child which will provide her with some security as she waits out the storm that is her life. Sverkel overhears and tells her a story of decisions he made to wait out the storms in his own life, but each left scars behind. Arnheid decides that she must settle things with Gardar and walks out into the cold windy night.
39	15	"Storm"; Transliteration: "Arashi" (Japanese: 嵐)	Takuya Igarashi	Hiroshi Seko	April 18, 2023
As a storm approaches, Arnheid walks to the retainer's camp to visit Gardar and treat his wounds. She is immobilized by guilt over what has happened to her, but Gardar suddenly leaps up, and although still bound, bites the guard's throat, killing him. He convinces Arnheid to cut the ropes, whereupon he slays the remaining guards and escapes with her on foot. Snake returns to find his men slaughtered and angrily sends his men off to kill Gardar. The next morning in the barn on Sverkel's farm, Einar and Thorfinn discuss how to stop the cycle of war and slavery, but Thorfinn does not see how things can change while Norse men gain respect through their physical prowess and success in battle. He wants to find a way to atone for the people he killed and create a place where people don't need swords. Einar replies that place must be beyond the reach of Vikings prompting Thorfinn to recall the land far to the west mentioned by Leif. Their discussion is interrupted by Fox and other retainers arriving to search the barn for Gardar.
40	16	"Cause" / "Great Purpose"; Transliteration: "Taigi" (Japanese: 大義)	Tadahito Matsubayashi	Hiroshi Seko	April 25, 2023
Realizing that Gardar is free, Einar races with Thorfinn to Sverkel's farmhouse to check on Arnheid, but everything seems normal. However, Arnheid confesses that she helped Gardar escape, and he is now badly wounded and laying hidden in Sverkel's farmhouse. Einar offers to help her and Gardar escape and Thorfinn agrees. While Snake, Badger, and Spider wait for Gardar inside the house, using Arnheid as bait, Sverkel reminds Snake that only luck determines who are masters or slaves. Spider sees Einar disguised as Gardar under a tree in the distance, and the three men ride out to give chase. Meanwhile, with Sverkel's approval, Thorfinn loads the unconscious Gardar onto his cart, preparing to head off in the opposite direction. Sverkel plans to come with them in the cart so they won't arouse suspicion. Snake suspects the man they are chasing is not Gardar, as he is running too fast for a gravely wounded man, and returns quietly by foot to the farmhouse to see Thorfinn with Gardar, preparing to escape. As the unarmed Thorfinn faces the experienced swordsman, he imagines Askeladd asking him if he will choose to remain a pacifist, or fight Snake to help Arnheid and Gardar. Thorfinn then prepares in the stance he used for fighting with twin knives which confuses Snake.
41	17	"Way Home" / "The Road Home"; Transliteration: "Ieji" (Japanese: 家路)	Shingo Uchida, Yoho Ishikawa	Hiroshi Seko	May 2, 2023
Snake attacks Thorfinn with his curved sword, but Thorfinn manages to evade it and even land some blows. They fight to a standstill with each aware of the other's fighting skills, but Snake reaches the cart containing Gardar and stabs him in the chest in payment for the five men he killed. While Snake tells Arnheid and Thorfinn that they will have to be punished, Gardar grabs Snake and begins to choke him. Arnheid convinces Gardar to stop and leave with her, fabricating a story that she sent their son to live with his elder brother. Sverkel offers his cart to Gardar, and he quietly leaves with Arnheid. However, Gardar is dying from his wounds, and in a delirium, recalls the birth of his son, his life as a warrior and a slave, and the futility of a life of adventuring while abandoning his family. As he dies in Arnheid's arms, retainers arrive to take them into custody.
42	18	"The First Measure" / "The First Method"; Transliteration: "Saisho no Shudan" (Japanese: 最初の手段)	Yousuke Yamamoto	Hiroshi Seko	May 9, 2023
Canute sails towards Ketil's farm to requisition it, hopefully without bloodshed. Leif arrives at the farm with Thorgil, Olmar, and Ketil, the latter two still shaken by the events in Jelling. Thorgil starts readying the men at the farm for the impending battle with Canute. While Thorfinn and Einar await their punishment, Thorfinn contemplates an alternative to violence for resolving conflicts. When Ketil learns of Arnheid's escape attempt, he loses his temper and savagely beats her, even when she reveals that she is carrying his child. Snake eventually stops him, and Leif offers to buy her along with Thorfinn and Einar, but Ketil refuses to release her. Einar is devastated and enraged by the brutal beating of Arnheid, while Ketil angrily prepares to defend his land against the king.
43	19	"War at Ketil's Farm" / "The Battle of Ketil's Farm"; Transliteration: "Ketiru Nōjō no Tatakai" (Japanese: ケティル農場の戦い)	Takashi Ishida	Hiroshi Seko	May 16, 2023
Ketil gathers his men, numbering around 350 of mostly ragtag recruits, to defend the farm without revealing who they will be fighting until they are all gathered together. Canute's forces arrive in four ships and offer Ketil an ultimatum to surrender his lands and leave without bloodshed but with Thorgil on his side, Ketil decides to fight. Snake observes that they are up against 100 of the best fighters in Denmark including the Jomsvikings and realizes that they cannot win. However, he decides to fight for the debt he owes Ketil, and his few experienced men decide to accompany him. As the battle begins, Thorfinn, Einar, and Leif, leave in a cart with Arnheid who briefly regains consciousness. As Canute's forces push forward with little resistance, Thorgil circles around through the water and approaches King Canute from behind while the terrified and cowardly Olmar turns back and retreats.
44	20	"Pain"; Transliteration: "Itami" (Japanese: 痛み)	Aki Aoshima	Hiroshi Seko	May 23, 2023
Ketil's recruits are no match for the experienced Jomsvikings, and Snake calls for a retreat. Ketil stands transfixed by the poor defense and is quickly felled with an axe. At that moment, Thorgil rushes from the beach to kill Canute, but the king protects himself long enough for Wulf to return from the battle to defend him and recall the king's guard. Thorgil decides to escape back into the sea rather than be slaughtered. Meanwhile, Arnheid regains consciousness long enough to say goodbye, but she dies as Thorfinn tells her about Vinland, a sacred land beyond either wars or slavery. Einar is devastated and finally declares his love for her. Snake approaches them carrying the badly wounded Ketil, and Thorfinn stops Einar from killing the man who had beaten Arnheid to death. With Ketil still alive and not yet captured by Canute, the conflict is unresolved, and Thorfinn leaves Leif at his boat and heads off to meet Canute, intending to stop more bloodshed, if possible.
45	21	"Courage"; Transliteration: "Yūki" (Japanese: 勇気)	Tarou Kubo, Tomoko Hiramuki	Hiroshi Seko	May 30, 2023
After his initial victory, Canute prevents Floki and his Jomsvikings from pillaging the farm so that he can acquire it intact. With Ketil incapacitated, it falls to his nominated successor, Olmar, to decide whether to fight or surrender, a decision made difficult by the results of the battle with many of their men laying dead and wounded around him. He decides to surrender, accepting his responsibility in starting the conflict and the foolishness of his pride, and Thorgil storms off. Meanwhile, Thorfinn approaches Canute's camp alone and is greeted by a towering Jomsviking named Drott the Bear Killer, who ridicules his request to talk to the king and knocks him down. Einar arrives and tries to convince Thorfinn to leave, but instead he accepts the soldiers' bet that if he survives 100 punches from Drott, he can have his audience with the king.
46	22	"Emperor of Rebellion" / "The King of Rebellion"; Transliteration: "Hangyaku no Teiō" (Japanese: 叛逆の帝王)	Yoji Sato	Hiroshi Seko	June 6, 2023
Drott begins punching Thorfinn who manages to absorb and deflect most of the powerful blows, until Snake arrives, distracting him and he is knocked down by Drott after 32 blows. However, Thorfinn gets up and withstands another 68 blows until Drott collapses from exhaustion. When Wulf asks why he did not fight back, Thorfinn replies that it is not their battle, only a dispute between Canute and Ketil which could be just as easily be settled by a game of hnefatafl. Wulf agrees to take Thorfinn and Einar to Canute, who explains that only he can unite the Vikings. He states that the acquisition of Ketil's farm is a key of his plan and is not negotiable.
47	23	"Two Paths"; Transliteration: "Futatsu no Michi" (Japanese: ふたつの道)	Yoho Ishikawa	Hiroshi Seko	June 13, 2023
Thorfinn realizes that he cannot convince Canute to alter his path, and states that he will travel far away from the reach of the king. Canute is bemused, but he accepts Thorfinn's choice, and abandoning the ways of his father, he surprisingly alters his plan to forcefully seize farms. He even withdraws his troops from England, avoiding a potential uprising and earning the respect of the English nobles. Meanwhile, Thorfinn invites Einar to join him to find, or create, a land free of slavery and war, and honor Arnheid's memory. As they sail away, Snake finally announces his name, Roald, son of Grim. As the residents of Ketil's farm till the soil, they reflect on the great impact the small man Thorfinn has had on all their lives.
48	24	"Hometown" / "Home"; Transliteration: "Kokyō" (Japanese: 故郷)	Kento Matsui	Hiroshi Seko	June 20, 2023
Leif's boat with Thorfinn and Einar aboard arrives at Thorfinn's village in Iceland, but no-one recognizes him, not even his sister Ylva. However, Thorfinn's mother Helga verifies who he is and eventually he is accepted back into the family and his village. He recounts the major events of his life over the sixteen years that he has been away and how it has affected him. He explains that he wants to travel to Vinland and create a peaceful land and receives his mother's blessing. Leif offers to help financially and they begin to prepare for the journey.

== Shorts ==
No. overall	No. in season	Title	Original release date
30.5	6.5	"Drowning in the Shadow"	February 14, 2023
Thorfinn has a nightmare about slaughtering a family of farmers.
42.5	18.5	"Same old story"	May 12, 2023
Ketil declares war against King Canute in front of his men.

== Home media release ==
=== Japanese ===
VAP (Japan – Region 2/A)
Volume	Episodes	Release date	Ref.
1	25–36	June 21, 2023	
2	37–48	August 23, 2023	

=== English ===
Crunchyroll (North America, Region 1/A)
Volume	Episodes	Release date	Ref.
Season 2 Part 1	1–12	July 2, 2024	
Season 2 Part 2	13–24	October 15, 2024	
