= List of Crunchyroll Anime Award records =

MAPPA (animation studio of Yuri on Ice, Jujutsu Kaisen and Chainsaw Man), holds several records of wins and nominations in a studio, most notably winning the Anime of the Year four times out of ten nominations.

This list of Crunchyroll Anime Award records is current as of the 10th Crunchyroll Anime Awards, which took place on May 23, 2026.

== Awards or nominations ==
=== Anime series ===
- Each anime series's seasons have numbers of wins and nominations (win-nom). For example, "anime-title-season-1" (6 [wins]-12 [nominations]).
- Feature films are not included on the list. However, there is another list on the anime series below.
- Only anime series with 13 nominations above included on the list.

Nominations	Winners	Title	Seasons
47	19	Demon Slayer: Kimetsu no Yaiba	Unwavering Resolve Arc (3–9); Mugen Train Arc (5–6); Entertainment District Arc (6–12); Swordsmith Village Arc (3–12); Hashira Training Arc (2–8)
46	17	Attack on Titan	Season 2 (0–3); Season 3 (3–8) (Note: 6 nominations at the 4th ceremony, 1 nomination at the 3rd and 5th ceremony, respectively); The Final Season Part 1 (4–11); The Final Season Part 2 (6–12); The Final Chapters Special 1 (2–10); The Final Chapters Special 2 (2–3) (Note: including Global Impact Award at the 9th ceremony.)
45	22	Jujutsu Kaisen	Season 1 cour 1 (3–10); Season 1 cour 2 (7–17) (Note: 16 nominations at the 6th ceremony, 1 nomination at the 7th ceremony.); Season 2 (12–18) (Note: 17 nominations at the 8th ceremony, 1 nomination at the 9th ceremony.)
44	19	My Hero Academia	Season 1 (1–8) (Note: 7 nominations at the 1st ceremony, 1 nomination at the 7th ceremony.); Season 2 (8–10) (Note: including Industry Icon Award for Christopher Sabat as All Might.); Season 3 (4–5); Season 4 (2–4) (Note: 3 nominations at the 5th ceremony, 1 nomination at the 4th ceremony.); Season 5 (0–1); Season 7 (0–1); Final Season (4–15)
42	5	Dandadan	Season 1 (3–22); Season 2 (2–20)
40	12	Spy × Family	Season 1 cour 1 (6–19); Season 1 cour 2 (2–7); Season 2 (2–5); Season 3 (2–9)
30	6	The Apothecary Diaries	Season 1 (1–13); Season 2 (5–17)
25	6	Chainsaw Man	Season 1 (6–25)
25	2	Ranking of Kings	Season 1 cour 1 (1–6); Season 1 cour 2 (1–17); The Treasure Chest of Courage (0–2)
23	11	Solo Leveling	Season 1 (9–13); Arise from the Shadow (2–10)
22	4	Mob Psycho 100	Season 1 (2–8); Season 2 (2–7); Season 3 (0–7)
20	4	Frieren: Beyond Journey's End	Season 1 (4–20)
20	1	Kaiju No. 8	Season 1 (1–16); Season 2 (0–4)
19	6	Kaguya-sama: Love Is War	Season 1 (3–5); Season 2 (1–6) (Note: 5 nominations at the 5th ceremony, 1 nomination at the 6th ceremony.); Ultra Romantic (1–8)
18	0	My Dress-Up Darling	Season 1 (0–12); Season 2 (0–6)
17	1	Oshi no Ko	Season 1 (1–12); Season 2 (0–5)
17	5	One Piece	Wano Arc (3–8) (Note: 1 nomination at the 7th ceremony, 7 nominations at the 8th ceremony.); Egghead Arc (2–9) (Note: 3 nominations at the 9th ceremony, 6 nominations at the 10th ceremony.)
16	3	Gachiakuta	Season 1 (3–16)
16	1	Vinland Saga	Season 1 (1–10) (Note: 9 nominations at the 4th ceremony, 1 nomination at the 7th ceremony.); Season 2 (0–6) (Note: 5 nominations at the 8th ceremony, 1 nomination at the 9th ceremony.)
16	0	Delicious in Dungeon	Season 1 (0–16)
14	2	JoJo's Bizarre Adventure	Diamond Is Unbreakable (0–4); Golden Wind (2–6) (Note: 2 nominations at the 3th ceremony, 4 nomination at the 4th ceremony.); Stone Ocean (0–4)
13	2	Cyberpunk: Edgerunners	Season 1 (2–13)

=== Films ===
- **BOLD** indicates the winner.

Nominations	Winners	Title	Categories
13	2	Chainsaw Man – The Movie: Reze Arc	10th edition: Film of the Year; **Best Anime Song (2x)**; Best Score; Best VA Performance (Japanese) (2x); Best VA Performance (English); Best VA Performance (Castilian Spanish); Best VA Performance (French); Best VA Performance (German); Best VA Performance (Latin Spanish); **Best VA Performance (Italian)**; Best VA Performance (Hindi)
8	7	Demon Slayer: Kimetsu no Yaiba – The Movie: Infinity Castle	10th edition: **Film of the Year**; **Best Score**; **Best VA Performance (English)**; **Best VA Performance (Brazilian Portuguese)**; **Best VA Performance (Castilian Spanish)**; **Best VA Performance (German)**; **Best VA Performance (Latin Spanish)**; Best VA Performance (Hindi)
6	1	Suzume	8th edition: **Film of the Year**; Best Anime Song; Best Score; Best VA Performance (French); Best VA Performance (German); Best VA Performance (Latin Spanish)
4	3	Jujutsu Kaisen 0	7th edition: **Film of the Year**; **Best VA Performance (Castilian Spanish)**; **Best VA Performance (German)**; Best VA Performance (Brazilian Portuguese)
4	0	One Piece Film: Red	7th edition: Film of the Year; Best Anime Song; 8th edition: Best VA Performance (Castilian Spanish); Best VA Performance (Italian)
3	3	Demon Slayer: Kimetsu no Yaiba – The Movie: Mugen Train	6th edition: **Film of the Year**; **Best VA Performance (Castilian Spanish)**; **Best VA Performance (Russian)**
3	2	Look Back	9th edition: **Film of the Year**; Best Score; **Best VA Performance (Italian)**
3	0	Dragon Ball Super: Super Hero	7th edition: Film of the Year; Best VA Performance (English); Best VA Performance (Castilian Spanish)
3	0	Evangelion 3.0+1.0 Thrice Upon a Time	6th edition: Film of the Year; Best VA Performance (Castilian Spanish); Best VA Performance (Latin Spanish)

=== Consecutive wins in a single category ===
Record	Name	Category	Year Achieved
4	Demon Slayer: Kimetsu no Yaiba	Best Animation	2022–2025
4	Anya Forger	"Must Protect at All Costs" Character	2023–2026
3	Hiroyuki Sawano	Best Score	2023–2025
2	Izuku "Deku" Midoriya	Best Protagonist	2017–2018
2	My Hero Academia	Best Antagonist (Note: Stain won in the 2nd edition, All For One won in the 3rd edition.)	2018–2019
2	My Hero Academia	Best Boy (Note: Shoto Todoroki won in the 2nd edition, Izuku "Deku" Midoriya won in the 3rd edition.)	2018–2019
2	MAPPA	Anime of the Year	2020–2021
2	Kaguya-sama: Love Is War	Best Comedy	2020–2021
2	Eren Yeager	Best Main Character (Note: Eren Yeager is the main protagonist/antagonist of the series. Both "Best Protagonist" and "Best Antagonist" have been replaced to "Best Main Character", "Best Supporting Character" and "Must Protect at All Costs" Character.)	2022–2023
2	Yuki Kaji	Best VA Performance (Japanese)	2022–2023
2	Attack on Titan	Best Opening Sequence	2022–2023
2	Attack on Titan	Best Drama	2023–2024
2	Kohta Yamamoto	Best Score	2023–2024
2	Attack on Titan	Best Score	2023–2024
2	Spy × Family	Best Comedy	2023–2024
2	Demon Slayer: Kimetsu no Yaiba	Best Fantasy	2023–2024
2	Solo Leveling	Best Action	2025–2026
2	Re:Zero – Starting Life in Another World	Best Isekai Anime	2025–2026
2	Aoi Yūki	Best VA Performance (Japanese)	2025–2026
2	Charles Emmanuel	Best VA Performance (Brazilian Portuguese)	2025–2026

== Firsts ==
=== Inauguration ===
==== Major categories ====
Record	Title	Edition(s)
Anime of the Year	Yuri on Ice	1st edition
Best Action	Mob Psycho 100	1st edition
Best Comedy	Haven't You Heard? I'm Sakamoto	1st edition
Best Drama	Erased	1st edition
Film of the Year	Your Name	2nd edition
Best CGI	Land of the Lustrous	2nd edition
Best Continuing Series	March Comes in Like a Lion	2nd edition
Best Manga	My Lesbian Experience with Loneliness	2nd edition
Best Slice of Life	Girls' Last Tour	2nd edition
Best Isekai Anime (Note: Formerly known as Best Fantasy (2020–2024))	The Promised Neverland	4th edition
Best Romance	Horimiya	6th edition
Best New Series	Spy × Family	7th edition
Best Original Anime	Lycoris Recoil	7th edition

==== Character categories ====
Record	Name	Title	Edition(s)
Best Protagonist	Izuku "Deku" Midoriya	My Hero Academia	1st edition
Best Antagonist	Gaku Yashiro	Erased	1st edition
Best Boy	Yuri Katsuki	Yuri on Ice	1st edition
Best Girl	Rem	Re:Zero − Starting Life in Another World	1st edition
Best Couple	Yuri and Victor	Yuri on Ice	1st edition
Best Main Character	Eren Jaeger	Attack on Titan: The Final Season Part 2	7th edition
Best Supporting Character	Anya Forger	Spy × Family	7th edition
"Must Protect at All Costs" Character	Anya Forger	Spy × Family	7th edition

==== Craft categories ====
Record	Name	Title	Edition(s)
Best Animation	MAPPA	Yuri on Ice	1st edition
Best Character Design	Takahiro Kishida	JoJo's Bizarre Adventure Golden Wind	3rd edition
Best Director	Masaaki Yuasa	Devilman Crybaby	3rd edition
Best Score	Kevin Penkin	Made in Abyss	7th edition
Best Anime Song	"The Rumbling" by SiM	Attack on Titan: The Final Season Part 2	7th edition
Best Cinematography	Teppei Ito	Jujutsu Kaisen (season 2)	8th edition
Best Background Art (Note: Formerly known as Best Art Direction (2024))	Koji Eto	Demon Slayer: Kimetsu no Yaiba Swordsmith Village Arc	8th edition

==== Sequence categories ====
Record	Sequence	Title	Edition(s)
Best Fight Scene	Shigeo vs. Koyama	Mob Psycho 100	1st edition
Best Opening Sequence	"History Maker" by Dean Fujioka	Yuri on Ice	1st edition
Best Ending Sequence	"You Only Live Once" by Wataru Hatano	Yuri on Ice	1st edition
Most Heartwarming Scene	The Kiss in "Episode 7"	Yuri on Ice	1st edition

==== VA categories ====
Best Voice Artist Performance
Record	Actor	Character	Title	Edition(s)
Japanese (JP)	Mamoru Miyano	Kotaro Tatsumi	Zombie Land Saga	3rd edition
English (EN)	Christopher Sabat	All Might	My Hero Academia (season 3)	3rd edition
Brazilian Portuguese (PT)	Lucas Almeida	Eren Jaeger	Attack on Titan (season 3)	5th edition
German (DE)	René Dawn-Claude	Satoru Gojo	Jujutsu Kaisen	6th edition
French (FR)	Enzo Ratsito	Tanjiro Kamado	Demon Slayer: Kimetsu no Yaiba Mugen Train Arc	6th edition
Latin American Spanish (LA)	Irwin Daayán	Kyojuro Rengoku	Demon Slayer: Kimetsu no Yaiba Mugen Train Arc	6th edition
Castilian Spanish (SP)	Marcel Navarro	Tanjiro Kamado	Demon Slayer: Kimetsu no Yaiba – The Movie: Mugen Train	6th edition
Russian (RU)	Islam Gandzhaev	Tanjiro Kamado	Demon Slayer: Kimetsu no Yaiba – The Movie: Mugen Train	7th edition
Arabic (AR)	Amal Hajiwa	Gon Freecss	Hunter × Hunter	7th edition
Italian (IT)	Elisa Giorgio	Maki Zen'in	Jujutsu Kaisen	7th edition
Hindi (HI)	Lohit Sharma	Satoru Gojo	Jujutsu Kaisen (season 2)	9th edition

==== Special categories ====
Record	Name	Edition(s)
Industry Icon Award	Christopher Sabat	2nd edition
Global Impact Award	Attack on Titan	9th edition

=== Genres ===
Anime of the Year
Record	Name	Edition(s)
Action	Devilman Crybaby	3rd edition
Adventure	Made in Abyss	2nd edition
Comedy	Yuri on Ice	1st edition
Drama	Yuri on Ice	1st edition
Fantasy	Made in Abyss	2nd edition
Horror	Devilman Crybaby	3rd edition
LGBTQ+	Yuri on Ice	1st edition
Martial arts	Demon Slayer: Kimetsu no Yaiba	4th edition
Science fiction	Made in Abyss	2nd edition
Sports	Yuri on Ice	1st edition
Superhero	Devilman Crybaby	3rd edition
Romance	Yuri on Ice	1st edition

=== Varieties ===
Record	Name	Edition(s)	Note
First anime series to win multiple Anime of the Year	Jujutsu Kaisen	Season 1 (5th); Season 2 (8th)	The second cour of the first season was also nominated, but lost to Attack on Titan: The Final Season Part 1, another MAPPA work.
First original anime series to win Anime of the Year	Yuri on Ice	1st edition	Yuri on Ice is not based on any source material.
First video game-adapted anime series to win Anime of the Year	Cyberpunk: Edgerunners	7th edition	Based on a video game Cyberpunk 2077 by Polish video game development studio CD Projekt Red.
First manhwa-adapted anime series to win Anime of the Year	Solo Leveling	9th edition	Based on South Korean web novel of the same name by Chugong.
First concluding season of an anime series to win Anime of the Year	My Hero Academia (Final Season)	10th edition	The eighth and final season based on Kōhei Horikoshi's manga series won the top prize at the awards' tenth anniversary, capping off a ten-year series' run during the anime's tenth anniversary.
First film director to win multiple Film of the Year	Makoto Shinkai	2nd and 8th editions	Shinkai and his animation studio CoMix Wave Films produced Your Name (2016) and Suzume (2022), which won Film of the Year in both films.
First studio to win multiple Film of the Year	CoMix Wave Films	2nd and 8th editions	Shinkai and his animation studio CoMix Wave Films produced Your Name (2016) and Suzume (2022), which won Film of the Year in both films.
First film ever to be nominated for both Crunchyroll Anime Award and Academy Award	Mirai	3rd edition	Mirai is the only non-Ghibli film to be nominated an Academy Award for Best Animated Feature category due to all Ghibli films were previously (and currently) nominated.
First anime series to win multiple Best Animation	Demon Slayer: Kimetsu no Yaiba	6th–9th editions	Demon Slayer: Kimetsu no Yaiba won the same category in four consecutive years, most of any anime series.
First video game studio to win a Crunchyroll Anime Award	CD Projekt Red	7th edition	A video game studio based in Poland, best known for video game series The Witcher, as well as original game Cyberpunk 2077.
First member of Generation Z to win a Crunchyroll Anime Award	Zach Aguilar (as David Martinez in Cyberpunk: Edgerunners)	7th edition	At the age of 24, he remains the youngest recipient to win.

== Superlatives ==
=== Most wins ===
Record	Name	Numbers	Edition(s)
Anime series	Jujutsu Kaisen	22	5th–9th editions
Anime series in a single edition	Jujutsu Kaisen	11	8th edition
Feature film	Demon Slayer: Kimetsu no Yaiba – The Movie: Infinity Castle	7	10th edition
Fictional character	Anya Forger	5	7th–10th editions
Fictional characters in a single edition	My Hero Academia (season 2)	4	2nd edition
Anime of the Year (anime series)	Jujutsu Kaisen	2	5th and 8th editions
Anime of the Year (studio)	MAPPA	4	1st, 5th–6th, 8th editions
Overall	Demon Slayer: Kimetsu no Yaiba	29	4th–10th editions

=== Most nominations ===
Record	Name	Numbers	Edition(s)
Anime series	Demon Slayer: Kimetsu no Yaiba	47	4th–9th editions
Anime series in a single edition	Chainsaw Man	25	8th edition
Feature film	Chainsaw Man – The Movie: Reze Arc	13	10th edition
Fictional character	Izuku "Deku" Midoriya	10	1st–3rd, 5th–10th editions
Fictional characters in a single edition	My Hero Academia (season 2)	6	2nd edition
Anime of the Year (anime series)	Demon Slayer: Kimetsu no Yaiba Jujutsu Kaisen My Hero Academia	3	4th, 7th–8th editions 5th–6th, 8th editions 1st–2nd, 10th editions
Anime of the Year (studio)	MAPPA	10	1st, 3rd, 5th–8th editions
Overall	Demon Slayer: Kimetsu no Yaiba	59	4th–10th editions

=== Most nominations without a win ===
Record	Name	Numbers	Edition(s)
Anime series	My Dress-Up Darling	18	7th and 10th editions
Anime series in a single edition	Delicious in Dungeon	16	9th edition
Feature film	One Piece Film: Red	4	7th and 8th editions
Feature film in a single edition	Evangelion 3.0+1.0 Thrice Upon a Time Dragon Ball Super: Super Hero	3	6th edition 7th edition
Fictional character	Joe Ken "Okarun" Takakura	3	3rd and 6th editions 8th–9th editions
Fictional characters from an anime series	Dandadan	9	8th–9th editions

=== Sweep and losses ===
Record	Name	Numbers	Edition(s)
Highest "clean sweep" in a single edition	Yuri on Ice	7 wins out of 7 nominations	1st edition
Highest "clean sweep" for fictional characters in a single edition (Note: Consisting of Best Protagonist (or Best Hero), Best Antagonist (Best Villain), Best Boy, Best Girl.)	My Hero Academia (season 2)	4 out of 6 nominations (Note: Only Izuku "Deku" Midoriya and Tsuyu Asui received Best Boy and Best Girl nominations, respectively.)	2nd edition
Highest "clean sweep" without winning Anime of the Year in a single edition	My Hero Academia (season 2)	8 wins out of 10 nominations (Note: All six categories have won in a single edition. In addition of both Best Boy and Best Girl categories: Izuku "Deku" Midoriya and Shoto Todoroki received Best Boy nominations, while Ochaco Uraraka and Tsuyu Asui received Best Girl nominations; with Todoroki and Uraraka winning, so that makes eight wins.)	2nd edition
Most losses in a single edition (anime series)	Chainsaw Man Dandadan	19 (Note: Chainsaw Man has 6 wins out of 25 nominations and Dandadan has 3 wins out of 22 nominations.)	8th edition 9th edition
Most losses while winning Anime of the Year in a single edition	Cyberpunk: Edgerunners (Note: Cyberpunk: Edgerunners has 2 wins out of 13 nominations) My Hero Academia: Final Season (Note: My Hero Academia: Final Season has 4 wins out of 15 nominations.)	11	7th edition 10th edition
Most losses in a single edition (feature film)	Chainsaw Man – The Movie: Reze Arc (Note: Chainsaw Man – The Movie: Reze Arc has 2 wins out of 13 nominations.)	11	10th edition
Most losses while winning Film of the Year in a single edition	Suzume	5 (Note: Suzume has 1 win out of 6 nominations.)	8th edition
Most losses without a win in a single edition (anime series)	Delicious in Dungeon	16	9th edition
Most losses without a win in a single edition (feature film)	Evangelion 3.0+1.0 Thrice Upon a Time Dragon Ball Super: Super Hero	3	6th edition 7th edition

=== Age ===
Record	Name	Record	Recent title	Age
Oldest winner	Masaaki Yuasa	2	Keep Your Hands Off Eizouken!	55
Oldest nominee	Masaaki Yuasa	2	Keep Your Hands Off Eizouken!	55
Youngest winner	Aoi Yūki	2	The Apothecary Diaries (season 2)	34
Youngest nominee	Keiichirō Saitō	2	Frieren: Beyond Journey's End	31

== Contenders ==
Several anime films and series have received Crunchyroll nominations while receiving rare nominations from different organizations other than Crunchyroll, most notably the Astra Awards, Annie Awards, Saturn Awards, and Japan Academy Film Prize.

=== Crunchyroll and Critics' Choice Awards Celebration of AAPI Cinema and Television ===
Edition	Title	Film of the Year	International Animation Award
8th	Suzume	Won	
10th	Demon Slayer: Kimetsu no Yaiba – The Movie: Infinity Castle	Won	

=== Crunchyroll and Harvey Awards ===
Edition	Title	Anime of the Year	Best Adaptation from Comic Book/Graphic Novel
10th	My Hero Academia: Final Season	Won	Nominated
Edition	Title	Film of the Year	Best Adaptation from Comic Book/Graphic Novel
10th	Chainsaw Man – The Movie: Reze Arc	Nominated	
10th	Demon Slayer: Kimetsu no Yaiba – The Movie: Infinity Castle	Won	Nominated

=== Crunchyroll and Astra ===
Edition	Title	Anime of the Year	Best Anime Series
9th	The Apothecary Diaries	Nominated	
9th	Dandadan	Nominated	
9th	Frieren: Beyond Journey's End	Nominated	
9th	Solo Leveling	Won	
Edition	Title	Film of the Year	Best Animated Feature
10th	Demon Slayer: Kimetsu no Yaiba – The Movie: Infinity Castle	Won	Nominated
Edition	Title	Best VA Performance (English)	Best Lead Voice-Over Performance
9th	Aleks Le – Solo Leveling as Sung Jin-woo	Won	
Edition	Title	Film of the Year	Animation Is Cinema Award
10th	Demon Slayer: Kimetsu no Yaiba – The Movie: Infinity Castle	Won	Honored

=== Crunchyroll and Saturn ===
Edition	Title	Anime of the Year	Best Animated Series
8th	Chainsaw Man	Nominated	
9th	Kaiju No. 8	Nominated	
Edition	Title	Film of the Year	Best Animated Film
2nd	Your Name	Won	Nominated
8th	Suzume	Won	Nominated
9th	Spy × Family Code: White	Nominated	
Edition	Title	Film of the Year	Best International Animated Film
9th	The Colors Within	Nominated	
10th	Chainsaw Man – The Movie: Reze Arc	Nominated	
10th	Demon Slayer: Kimetsu no Yaiba – The Movie: Infinity Castle	Won	

=== Crunchyroll and British Academy Film Awards (BAFTAS) ===
Edition	Title	Film of the Year	Best Animated Film
10th	Demon Slayer: Kimetsu no Yaiba – The Movie: Infinity Castle	Won	Longlisted

=== Crunchyroll and Oscars ===
Mamoru Hosoda's Mirai is the only film to be nominated both Crunchyroll Anime Award for Film of the Year and Academy Award for Best Animated Feature at the same time. At one point, Makoto Shinkai's Your Name and Suzume are heavily speculated to finalist the Academy Awards (both were Crunchyroll winners), but they were ultimately not nominated.

Edition	Title	Film of the Year	Best Animated Feature
3rd	Mirai	Nominated	

=== Crunchyroll and Golden Globes ===
Edition	Title	Film of the Year	Best Animated Feature Film
3rd	Mirai	Nominated	
7th	Inu-Oh	Nominated	
8th	Suzume	Won	Nominated
10th	Demon Slayer: Kimetsu no Yaiba – The Movie: Infinity Castle	Won	Nominated

=== Crunchyroll and Annie Awards ===
Edition	Title	Film of the Year	Best Animated Feature – Independent
2nd	In This Corner of the World	Nominated	
2nd	Your Name	Won	Nominated
3rd	Mirai	Nominated	Won
6th	Belle	Nominated	
7th	Inu-Oh	Nominated	
9th	Look Back	Won	Nominated
10th	Scarlet	Nominated	
Edition	Title	Film of the Year	Best Animated Feature
8th	Suzume	Won	Nominated
Edition	Title	Best Director	Directing in an Animated Television/Broadcast Production
10th	Fūga Yamashiro and Abel Góngora – Dandadan (season 2)	Nominated	

=== Crunchyroll and Japan Academy Prize ===
Edition	Title	Film of the Year	Animation of the Year
2nd	A Silent Voice	Nominated	
2nd	In This Corner of the World	Nominated	Won
2nd	Your Name	Won	Nominated
3rd	Fireworks	Nominated	
3rd	The Night Is Short, Walk On Girl	Nominated	Won
3rd	Mirai	Nominated	Won
6th	Belle	Nominated	
6th	Demon Slayer: Kimetsu no Yaiba – The Movie: Mugen Train	Won	
6th	Evangelion 3.0+1.0 Thrice Upon a Time	Nominated	Won
6th	Josee, The Tiger and The Fish	Nominated	
7th	Inu-Oh	Nominated	
7th	Jujutsu Kaisen 0	Won	Nominated
7th	One Piece Film: Red	Nominated	
8th	Blue Giant	Nominated	
8th	The First Slam Dunk	Nominated	Won
8th	Suzume	Won	Nominated
9th	Haikyu!! The Dumpster Battle	Nominated	
9th	Look Back	Won	
10th	100 Meters	Nominated	
10th	Chainsaw Man – The Movie: Reze Arc	Nominated	
10th	Demon Slayer: Kimetsu no Yaiba – The Movie: Infinity Castle	Won	
