= Dan Da Dan: Evil Eye =

2025 Japanese animated film by Fūga Yamashiro

- North American theatrical release poster
- Directed by: Fūga Yamashiro; Abel Góngora
- Screenplay by: Hiroshi Seko
- Based on: Dandadan by Yukinobu Tatsu
- Produced by: Akifumi Fujio; Masanori Miyake; Yūma Takahashi
- Starring: Natsuki Hanae; Shion Wakayama; Kazuya Nakai; Nana Mizuki; Ayane Sakura; Kaito Ishikawa; Mayumi Tanaka
- Cinematography: Kazuto Izumida
- Edited by: Kiyoshi Hirose
- Music by: Kensuke Ushio
- Production company: Science Saru
- Distributed by: Mainichi Broadcasting System
- Release date: May 30, 2025
- Running time: 93 minutes
- Country: Japan
- Language: Japanese
- Box office: $7 million

Dan Da Dan: Evil Eye is a 2025 Japanese animated science fiction action horror film, consisting of the first three episodes of second season of the anime television series adaptation of the manga series Dandadan by Yukinobu Tatsu. It is a direct sequel to the first season of the anime television series as well as its second film adaptation, following Dan Da Dan: First Encounter (2024). The compilation film was directed by Fūga Yamashiro and Abel Góngora and written by Hiroshi Seko.

Dan Da Dan: Evil Eye was released on May 30, 2025, in Asia, June 6 in North America and Australia, and June 7 in Europe.

== Plot ==
Picking up from where season one left off, Momo Ayase, Okarun, and Jiji are at Jiji's house in a rural Byakuja Village. Jiji had them investigate the supposed curse hanging over the house. The trio are soon confronted by the Kito Family, who are the landlords for most of the village. Momo is attacked at the local hot spring while the women of the Kito family question Okarun and Jiji. An all-out fight reveals a hidden, cursed room within Jiji's home and the underground domain of the area's ancient god, Tsuchinoko, which was actually a Mongolian Death Worm. In the midst of the conflict, Jiji loses control of himself to the "Evil Eye", a vengeful entity. This entity was enraged and ready to take Okarun, Momo, and all of Byakuja Village down.

== Voice cast ==
Character	Japanese	English
Momo Ayase (綾瀬 桃, Ayase Momo)	Shion Wakayama	Abby Trott
Ken "Okarun" Takakura (高倉 健, Takakura Ken)	Natsuki Hanae	A.J. Beckles
Seiko Ayase (綾瀬 星子, Ayase Seiko)	Nana Mizuki	Kari Wahlgren
Aira Shiratori (白鳥 愛羅, Shiratori Aira)	Ayane Sakura	Lisa Reimold
Jin "Jiji" Enjoji (円城寺 仁, Enjoji Jin)	Kaito Ishikawa	Aleks Le

== Release ==
=== Theatrical ===
The film premiered in Australia through Sugoi Co on June 2, 2025 with a proper release on June 6 onwards. In North America, the film was released theatrically on June 6, 2025. Similar to the prior film, Evil Eye was distributed in partnership with GKIDS.

== Reception ==
=== Box office ===
As of June 27, 2025, Dan Da Dan: Evil Eye has grossed over $5.5 million in the United States from 1,085 theaters, and a total of $6.4 million globally.
