= Dan Da Dan: First Encounter =

2024 Japanese animated film by Fūga Yamashiro

- North American theatrical release poster
- Directed by: Fūga Yamashiro
- Screenplay by: Hiroshi Seko
- Based on: Dandadan by Yukinobu Tatsu
- Produced by: Akifumi Fujio; Masanori Miyake; Yūma Takahashi
- Starring: Natsuki Hanae; Shion Wakayama; Kazuya Nakai; Nana Mizuki; Ayane Sakura; Kaito Ishikawa; Mayumi Tanaka
- Cinematography: Kazuto Izumida
- Edited by: Kiyoshi Hirose
- Music by: Kensuke Ushio
- Production company: Science Saru
- Distributed by: Mainichi Broadcasting System
- Release date: August 31, 2024
- Running time: 75 minutes
- Country: Japan
- Language: Japanese
- Box office: $4.5 million

Dan Da Dan: First Encounter is a 2024 Japanese animated science fiction action comedy horror film, consisting of the first three episodes of the anime television series adaptation of the manga series Dandadan by Yukinobu Tatsu. The compilation film was directed by Fūga Yamashiro and written by Hiroshi Seko.

Dan Da Dan: First Encounter was released on August 31, 2024, in Asia, September 7 in Europe, and September 13 in North America. It received generally positive reviews from critics and grossed over $4 million worldwide.

== Plot ==
Momo Ayase is a high school girl who believes in ghosts but not aliens, while her friend Ken Takakura, whom Momo nicknames "Okarun", believes in aliens but not ghosts. In a bet to determine who is correct, the two decide to separately visit locations associated with both the occult and the supernatural—Momo visiting the former, and Okarun visiting the latter. Momo is abducted by a group of aliens who accidentally unblock her chakras, enabling latent psychic abilities. Meanwhile, Okarun is possessed by a cursed spirit who takes over his body.

After rescuing each other, Momo uses her newly-awakened psychokinetic power to suppress Okarun's curse, which gives him a depressed demon form with Turbo Granny's powers.

Returning to the shrine she tries to share what happened to them with her granny, but instead they found a Flatwoods monster. Momo and Okarun battle the Flatwoods monster. After defeating it, Momo becomes unconscious due to the exhaustion of the battle causing Turbo Granny to possess Okarun and leaving her vulnerable.

When Momo's grandmother Seiko, aka disreputable spirit medium Santa Dodoria, returns and saves Momo from a possessed Okarun, she coaches the teens how to defeat Turbo Granny.

The movie ends with Momo and Okarun going to the abandoned tunnel where Turbo Granny is located to challenge her and free Okarun from the curse.

== Voice cast ==
Character	Japanese	English
Momo Ayase (綾瀬 桃, Ayase Momo)	Shion Wakayama	Abby Trott
Ken "Okarun" Takakura (高倉 健, Takakura Ken)	Natsuki Hanae	A.J. Beckles
Seiko Ayase (綾瀬 星子, Ayase Seiko)	Nana Mizuki	Kari Wahlgren
Aira Shiratori (白鳥 愛羅, Shiratori Aira)	Ayane Sakura	Lisa Reimold
Jin "Jiji" Enjoji (円城寺 仁, Enjoji Jin)	Kaito Ishikawa	Aleks Le

== Release ==
=== Theatrical ===
The film was released theatrically in Asia on August 31, 2024, September 7, 2024, in Europe, and September 13, 2024, in North America. Mainichi Broadcasting System announced that the global theatrical release would be distributed in partnership with GKIDS in North America and Muse Communication in Southeast Asia.

== Reception ==
=== Box office ===
As of June 10, 2024, Dan Da Dan: First Encounter has grossed $4.05 million in the United States from 613 theaters.
