= The Heike Story (anime) =

Japanese original net animation series

- Key visual

平家物語 (Heike Monogatari)
- Genre: Drama
- Created by: Hideo Furukawa
- Original net animation
- Directed by: Naoko Yamada
- Produced by: Eunyoung Choi; Fumie Takeuchi; Mayo Arita; Noriko Ozaki; Shinichi Nakamura
- Written by: Reiko Yoshida
- Music by: Kensuke Ushio
- Studio: Science Saru
- Licensed by: Crunchyroll (Note: Formerly known as Funimation.); SEA: Bilibili
- Released: September 16, 2021 – November 25, 2021
- Episodes: 11

The Heike Story (Japanese: 平家物語, Hepburn: Heike Monogatari) is a Japanese original net animation series adapted from Hideo Furukawa's 2016 translation into modern Japanese of The Tale of the Heike, a 13th-century historical epic depicting the rise and fall of the Taira clan. The series was produced by Science Saru and directed by Naoko Yamada, and streamed from September 16 to November 25, 2021, on Fuji TV's on Demand (FOD)'s service, as well as on Funimation. This was then followed by the television broadcast through the same network's +Ultra programming block, which aired from January 13 to March 17, 2022. (Note: Fuji TV lists the series premiere at 24:55 on January 12, 2022, which is effectively 12:55 a.m. JST on January 13.)

== Plot ==
Set during the Genpei War (1180–1185), a devastating civil conflict that divided Japan, the story is told from the perspective of Biwa, a young girl and traveling biwa minstrel.

Following the death of her blind father, Biwa meets Taira no Shigemori, heir to the powerful Taira clan that is fighting for supremacy in the war. Shigemori also has the power of supernatural sight; with one of his eyes he sees ghosts of those killed in the war. Through his ability, he understands his clan's part in the killing of Biwa's father, and when Biwa relates a prophecy predicting the downfall of the Taira clan he believes that she has the same ability. The kind, level headed and responsible Shigemori invites Biwa to come live with him and his family under the auspices of being a playmate and companion for his children, but hopes that her power can prevent the downfall of the Taira clan. Biwa agrees to be taken in, but refuses to use her power to help the clan that was responsible for the death of her father. She serves to chronicle the events leading to the rise and fall of the Taira clan.

== Characters ==
Biwa (びわ)
Voiced by: Aoi Yūki (Japanese); Xanthe Huynh (English)
The daughter of a biwa hōshi who is killed by agents of the Taira after Biwa unintentionally insults them. She dresses like a boy and has one green and one brown eye which enables her to see into the future. Her character does not appear in the original epic.
Taira no Shigemori (平重盛)
Voiced by: Takahiro Sakurai (Japanese); John Gremillion (English)
The eldest son of Kiyomori, the leader of the Taira clan; in contrast to his father, he is level headed and responsible. He holds the posts of Palace Minister and Left Commander. He has four children: Koremori, Sukemori, Kiyotsune and Arimori. He has different colored eyes and can see the spirits of the dead, but is disparagingly referred to as the Lantern Lord because he keeps his household well-lit at night.
Taira no Tokuko (平徳子)
Voiced by: Saori Hayami (Japanese); Suzie Yeung (English)
Shigemori's half-sister who befriends Biwa. She becomes betrothed to Norihito, son of the Emperor. Her younger sister Moriko was married to Lord Fujiwara no Motazane (the older brother of Lord Motofusa) at the age of nine. When he died two years later, Moriko inherited his lands, angering Motofusa.
Taira no Kiyomori (平清盛)
Voiced by: Tesshō Genda (Japanese); Frank Todaro (English)
The leader of the Taira clan. He has become a monk, but still wields power, and his mercurial nature causes problems for the clan and his eldest son and heir, Shigemori. His other children are Munemori, Tomomori, Tokuko and Shigehira.
Taira no Tokiko (平時子)
Kiyomori's wife.
Taira no Koremori (平維盛)
Voiced by: Miyu Irino (Japanese); Douglas Gill (English)
Shigemori's eldest son.
Taira no Munemori (平宗盛)
Voiced by: Nobuyuki Hiyama
Shigemori's half-brother.
Emperor Go-Shirakawa (後白河法皇)
Voiced by: Shigeru Chiba (Japanese); Garrett Schneck (English)
The 77th emperor of Japan and father of Norihito.
Emperor Takakura (高倉天皇)
Voiced by: Koutaro Nishiyama
The 80th emperor of Japan. Go-Shirakawa's son whose personal name is Norihito and who marries Tokuko.
Taira no Shigeko (平滋子)
Voiced by: Maaya Sakamoto
Norihito's mother.

== Production ==
The series was directed by Naoko Yamada, written for television by Reiko Yoshida, and featured music by Kensuke Ushio. The trio previously collaborated on A Silent Voice (2016) and Liz and the Blue Bird (2018) at Kyoto Animation, while Yoshida and Ushio had worked with production studio Science Saru. Hitsujibungaku performed the opening theme "Hikaru Toki" (When the Light Shines), while Ani from Scha Dara Parr and Agraph performed the ending theme "unified perspective".

== Episode list ==
No.	Title (Note: All English titles are taken from Crunchyroll.)	Directed by (Note: Information is taken from the ending credits of each episode.)	Written by	Storyboarded by	Original release date
1	"If You Don't Belong to the Heike, You Won't Be a Person"; Transliteration: "Heike ni Arazareba Hito ni Arazu" (Japanese: 平家にあらざれば人にあらず)	Naoko Yamada	Reiko Yoshida	Naoko Yamada	September 16, 2021
Biwa expresses disgust at the behavior of the "kaburo boys", enforcers for the Taira clan. When her blind father acts to protect her from punishment, they kill him. The Taira clan under Kiyomori has prospered, but he finds the situation boring. He unveils his plan to his heir Shigemori to move to at Fukuhara, a day's journey from the capital, and build a torii and buildings at the sea at Itsukushima. He intends to create a harbor for large ships and increase their prosperity through sea trade. Biwa gains entrance to the palace and encounters Shigemori in a garden where she tells him that the end of the Taira clan is near. He notices her differently coloured eyes and believes that she can see the spirits of the dead as he can. She refuses to use her power to help him, however he accepts her into his household. Biwa meets Lady Tokuko and is horrified when she sees a vision of Tokuko drowning at sea. One day, Sukemori rushes back from a hunt and rides past Lord Motofusa, Emperor Takakura's regent, and is beaten by them for his insolence. Rather than apologize, Kiyomori sends Rokuhara's warriors to punish them which leads to the beginning of Heike's problems.
2	"The Glory of the Corrupt World is a Dream in a Dream"; Transliteration: "Shaba no Eiga wa Yume no Yume" (Japanese: 娑婆の栄華は夢のゆめ)	Ai Yukimura	Reiko Yoshida	Ai Yukimura	September 23, 2021
Shigemori dismisses the men who attacked Lord Motofusa and sends Sukemori to Ise to apologize for his disrespect, however Kiyomori is unrepentant for his impetuous actions. Tokuko explains to Biwa that Motofusa dislikes the Taira clan because her younger sister Moriko was married off into the Fujiwara clan and inherited the Fujiwara lands when her husband died soon after. Tokuko reveals that she is soon to be married off to Norihito, the young son of Emperor Go-Shirakawa. The Shirabyoshi, Lady Gio and her younger sister Lady Ginyo arrive at Kiyomori's request to keep her replacement, Hotoke-Gozen, company. Shigemori visits Emperor Go-Shirakawa and offers to resign, having his brother Munemori replace him. The emperor observes that although Kiyomori has entered the monastic life, he has not rejected involvement in worldly affairs. Biwa takes a liking to Gio, but is saddened to find that she and her sister leave and become nuns to avoid being pawns of Kiyomori. Biwa is cheered however by a vision that in the future, Hotoke-Gozen joins them. Later, when Tokuko leaves to marry Norihito, Biwa desperately tries to stop her, disturbed by her vision of Tokuko's death by drowning.
3	"Shishigatani Incident"; Transliteration: "Shishigatani no Inbō" (Japanese: 鹿ケ谷の陰謀)	China	Reiko Yoshida	China	September 30, 2021
Shigemori sails with Biwa and others of his family to the Itsukushima shrine where Kiyomori has made his seat of power. On their return, Biwa meets Tokuko who is yet to have a child, but Tokuko is unconcerned about it or the fact that Norihito appears to have taken a lover, Lady Kogo. Meanwhile Shigemori must deal with a matter involving the Enryakuji. Lord Morotsune of the Fujiwara who governs Kaga province with his brother Lord Morotaka, demanded to use the bath at a temple affiliated with the Enryakuji. When they were refused, they burned the temple, and the Enryakuji head priest Meiun demands retribution. Their father Lord Saiko who serves Emperor Go-Shirakawa seeks leniency on their behalf, but thousands of Enryakuji warrior monks march on the palace and the emperor orders it to be forcefully defended. Many Enryakuji are slain and wounded, and their portable shrines desecrated. In retribution the Enryakuji set fire to the court's estates, including that of Shigemori. In administrator Shunkan's villa at Shishigatani, Lord Saiko suggests to the emperor that the Heike are becoming too powerful. He proposes and alliance with the Genji and other nobles and clans with grievances against the Heike. However, when Kiyomori learns of the plot, he seizes Shukan and Saiko and prepares to march against the emperor. Shigemori pleads for Kiyomori to stop as they owe their prosperity to the emperor and he is faced with the dilemma of loyalty to the emperor and filial piety to his father.
4	"Unwritten Affair"; Transliteration: "Mumon no Sata" (Japanese: 無文の沙汰)	Shuntarō Tozawa	Reiko Yoshida	Ai Yukimura; Naoko Yamada	October 7, 2021
Tokuko goes into a difficult and prolonged labor causing fears for the life of her and the child. Saiko and the other conspirators are exiled by Kiyomori to Kikaigashima against Shigemori's advice. Shigemori comes to believe that Tokuko's problems are related to the mistreatment of the Kikaigashima exiles and proposes a compensatory ceremony. Kiyomori releases some of the exiles, who show remorse by sending a thousand sotoba into the sea, but he refuses to forgive Shukan and leaves him on the island. Tokuko successfully gives birth to a baby boy; however, Moriko dies at the age of 24, and rumors spread that it is punishment for the Taira gaining control of Fujiwara lands. Shigemori goes on a pilgrimage to Kumano and prays that he not live to see the Taira fall because of his father. Shortly after his return, Shigemori takes ill, and he has a vision of the Heike being punished for the actions of Kiyomori. Not long afterwards, he passes away, with Biwa beside him.
5	"Bridge Battle"; Transliteration: "Hashi Kassen" (Japanese: 橋合戦)	Moko-chan	Reiko Yoshida	Moko-chan	October 14, 2021
Munemori, Shigemori's half brother, takes control of the Heike, supported by his younger brothers Tomomori and Shigehira, while Kiyomori withdraws to Fukuhara. Meanwhile, Tokuko's son, the heir of her husband Norihito, is now healthy and growing. When Kiyomori learns that the emperor has taken the initiative and seized the Koremori's province of Echizen and the Fujiwara lands inherited by Moriko, he orders Munemori to gather troops to march on the capital. Initially successful, Kiyomori instils his grandson, Tokuko's child, as the new emperor. However, the Taira family begin to inflict belittling insults on the vanquished clans, sowing the seed of insurrection. Go-Shirakawa's son, Prince Mochihito, leads the Taira forces to the bridge over the Uji River (1180) and defeat the opposition forces supported by the Genji. Victorious, they set fire to the Onoji Temple.
6	"City Transition"; Transliteration: "Miyako Utsuri" (Japanese: 都遷り)	Takayoshi Nagatomo	Reiko Yoshida	Chizuko Kusakabe	October 21, 2021
The Taira clan moves to their new capital at Fukuhara where they hope for some stability. Atsumori, the youngest son of Tsunemori arrives and befriends Kiyotsune over their love of the flute. Kiyomori learns that Lord Yoritomo is taking up arms against the Heike, at the prompting of a decree from Go-Shirakawa. Enraged, Kiyomori appoints Koremori as commander to lead a force against Yoritomo and assembles 70,000 horsemen. While they are camped in the field, Koremori learns that Yoritomo has received support from the Genji and now has 200,000 horsemen at his command. That evening, they see the thousands of torches of the anti-Heike forces surrounding them. During the night, a flock of waterbirds suddenly take flight, causing the Heike to suspect that their enemy is making a surprise attack, and they flee for their lives. Kiyomori is furious at the turn of events and threatens to execute their strategist Tadakiyo and exile Koremori, but he is eventually convinced to temper his anger. Later, Koremori confesses to Biwa that he was afraid, and that his carefree days of dancing and music are over.
7	"Kiyomori, Dies"; Transliteration: "Kiyomori, Shisu" (Japanese: 清盛、死す)	Ai Yukimura	Reiko Yoshida	Takayoshi Nagatomo	October 28, 2021
Under political pressure, Kiyomori moves the capital back to Kyoto, but he is suspected of planning an attack on his enemies. Meanwhile, Emperor Takakura, formerly Prince Norihito, is ill, with Tokuko faithfully staying by his side. Rumors spread of an uprising among the monks of Kofukuji, who fear an attack by the Heike, so Kiyomori sends 60 unarmed men to Kofukuji to assure them they have no intention of fighting, but the monks kill the envoys and place their heads on spikes to avenge the destruction of Onoji Temple. Outraged, Kiyomori sends Shigehara to Kofukuji, where he launches an assault with arrows before nightfall. Fearing a counterattack, Shigehara light fires which spread first to Kofukuji Temple and then to Todaiji, further damaging the reputation of the Heike. Meanwhile, Kiyomori wants Tokuko and Takakura's son Antoku to take control of the palace on his behalf, but Tokuko refuses, threatening to become a nun instead. The issue is dropped, and soon Kiyomori succumbs to an unnatural fever and dies, leaving the Taira clan leaderless and surrounded by enemies. Sukemori sends Biwa away for her own good. Back at the palace, Tokuko makes peace with the ageing Go-Shirakawa and promises to look after his grandson Antoku.
8	"Leaving the Capital"; Transliteration: "Miyako Ochi" (Japanese: 都落ち)	Takayoshi Nagatomo; Yoshie Ezaki	Reiko Yoshida	Takayoshi Nagatomo	November 4, 2021
Biwa visits the temple where Gio's sister tells her that Gio and Hotoke-Gozen have died although a former shirabyoshi with similar eyes to Biwa was seen in Echigo. Biwa travels there only to find the woman has returned to the capital. After hearing of the defeat of Yoritomo at Sunomatagawa at the hands of the Taira, Yoshinaka joins him to fight against the Heike. Koremori fears an attack by the combined Genji allies and moves against Yoshinaka. However, Yoshinaka mounts a surprise night attack, outmaneuvering Koremori and his troops who are unfamiliar with the landscape, trapping them in Kurikara Valley where most of the 70,000 Taira troops are slaughtered. The loss prompts the Heike to abandon the capital and move to Fukuhara although Koremori chooses to remain, ashamed by his loss at Kurikara. The Taira find Fukuhara run-down and in ruins so Munemori suggests they abandon the site, burning it to the ground as they set sail on for Dazaifu hoping to meet up with Heike allies. Meanwhile, Yoshinaka triumphantly marches into the capital.
9	"Heike Flowing"; Transliteration: "Heike Nagaruru" (Japanese: 平家流るる)	Ryōhei Takeshita	Reiko Yoshida	Ryōhei Takeshita	November 11, 2021
Biwa is taken in by three young shirabyoshi led by Shizuka Gozen, later Yoshitsune's lover, while Yoshinaka's troops run rampant in the capital, looting and pillaging as they please. Retired Emperor Go-Shirakawa returns to the capital with Yoshinaka's armies. He installs a new emperor, Go-Toba, and outlaws the Taira. The Taira's former ally at Dazaifu, Lord Ogata, is ordered to expel the Heike and so they leave on foot for the port of Hakozaki. When they arrive, Kiyotsune loses hope and throws himself into the water and Biwa sees his death in a vision. Biwa eventually finds her mother who is now blind and calls her Asagi. Biwa eventually forgives her mother for abandoning her and leaves to observe the fortunes of the Heike. Meanwhile, Yoshinaka falls out with Go-Shirakawa and imprisons the former emperor. Yoritomo becomes concerned by Yoshinaka's ambitions and sends Yoshitsune to subdue him. Yoshitsune recaptures the capital and Yoshinaka is killed during an ensuing skirmish. Yoshitsune goes on to pursue the Heike who have returned to Fukuhara, where they put up a strong defense at their stronghold but must flee by boat. As they leave, Atsumori is challenged to a fight by the warrior Kumagai Naozane, who reluctantly kills the young man which is witnessed by Biwa.
10	"Dan-no-ura"; Transliteration: "Dan-no-ura" (Japanese: 壇ノ浦)	Fūga Yamashiro	Reiko Yoshida	Fūga Yamashiro	November 18, 2021
Munemori, now the head of the Heike, receives a letter from Shigehira who has been captured by the Genji forces, requesting that Sacred Treasures be returned to Go-Shirakawa. Suspecting that Shigehira may not be spared, Munemori refuses. The Heike await an impending attack by the Genji-Yoshitsune alliance and Koremori despairs of the Heike surviving. Shigehira accepts the blame for the fiery destruction in Nara claiming it was not intentional. Koremori decides to become a monk and takes off by boat, encountering Biwa along the way who sees a vision of his death - he later suicides by drowning. Sukemori sends a letter to Go-Shirakawa pleading for the Taira to be spared, but he does receive a reply. Biwa arrives at Shimonoseki with letter for Sukemori from Lady Iko and then stays on to witness the downfall of the Heike. Go-Shirakawa sends Yoshitsune to attack the Heike and he drives them toward the sea. The Heike take to the water at the Shimonoseki Strait in 1,000 boats, but are pursued and attacked by Yoshitsune with 3,000 boats in what has become known as the battle of Dan-no-ura.
11	"The Impermanence of Worldly Things"; Transliteration: "Shogyō Mujō" (Japanese: 諸行無常)	Naoko Yamada	Reiko Yoshida	Moko-chan; Naoko Yamada	November 25, 2021
The sea battle of Dan-no-ura begins with volleys of arrows being fired by both sides, then the boats close in, ramming each other. The outgoing tide initially favors the Heike and they push the Genji forces offshore. However, a school of dolphins are seen swimming around the Heike boats and a banner falls which are considered bad omens. As the tide begins to change, the Genji gain the advantage and begin pushing the Heike boats backwards, then the Genji are joined by warriors from Shikoku and Kyūshū. The location of the Taira family within the fleet is betrayed to Yoshitzune and he approaches them to capture the Imperial Treasures. As the end approaches for the Taira clan, Kiyomori's widow, Tokiko, takes the young emperor Antoku in her arms and commits suicide by drowning. They are followed by many others of the clan, but Biwa helps save Tokuko saying that it is not her time to die. Some time after the battle, Go-Shirakawa visits a temple where Tokuko has become a nun dedicated to prayer. As he leaves, Biwa plays her instrument, telling the story of the clan, and the Buddha's temple bells toll the message that all existence is impermanent and that all who flourish must fall.

== Marketing ==
In cooperation with Okada Museum of Art, a special art exhibition focusing on both the history of the Genpei War and the production of the series opened on January 2, 2022. The exhibition ran at the museum through February 27.

== Reception ==
Reviewing the series during its streaming release in the United States, anime-focused website Anime News Network featured responses from three reviewers. Analyzing the first six episodes, Rebecca Silverman rated the series with 4 and a half stars, concluding that "it may still be a bit of a confusing story to follow, but it's also one that has survived this many centuries for a reason." In a joint review of the first six episodes, Jean-Karlo Lemus and Monique Thomas praised the series' artistry, complex story, and usage of music, with Lemus concluding "The Heike Story is easily one of the best-looking shows this season" and "this series could touch a lot of fans," and Thomas calling it "an instant classic".

In a review for Japan-based magazine Metropolis, Chris Cimi called the show "a 13th century epic turned modern anime triumph" and wrote that the series "culminates into something exceedingly rare in the modern landscape of Japanese animation as a business; a show worth watching, no matter where you fall on the anime divide."

Reviewing the series during its Japanese television release, Kenichiro Horii of Yahoo! Japan praised the series, writing that "The Tale of the Heike, one of Japan's treasures, has been transferred into a beautiful image, including its spirit. The anime The Heike Story is a work that has the potential to become a new Japanese treasure."

Following the conclusion of its streaming release, The Heike Story was named one of the best series of 2021 by Anime News Network, Paste Magazine, Comic Book Resources, /Film, the editorial staff of Crunchyroll, and Polygon. Acclaimed video game director Hideo Kojima praised the series, devoting specific attention to its use of camera work and framing.
