= Crunchyroll Anime Award for Best Character Design =

- Awarded for: Best character design of the previous year
- Country: United States; Japan
- First award: Takahiro Kishida — JoJo's Bizarre Adventure: Golden Wind (2019)
- Currently held by: Satoshi Ishino — Gachiakuta (2026)

Highlights
- Most wins: Tadashi Hiramatsu (2)
- Most nominations: Akira Matsushima (3)
- Website: Crunchyroll Anime Awards

The Crunchyroll Anime Award for Best Character Design is a character design award given at the Crunchyroll Anime Awards since its third edition in 2019. It is given for the best character design from the previous year. Winners are determined through a combined voting process by judges and public voting.

Takahiro Kishida first won the award in 2019 for his character design of JoJo's Bizarre Adventure: Golden Wind. In the latest edition in 2026, Satoshi Ishino won the award for his character design of Gachiakuta.

== Winners and nominees ==
In the following list, the first titles listed in gold are the winners; those not in gold are nominees, which are listed in alphabetical order. The years given are those in which the ceremonies took place.

=== 2010s ===
Year	Designer(s)	Anime
2018 (3rd)
2018 (3rd)	Takahiro Kishida, original design by Hirohiko Araki	JoJo's Bizarre Adventure: Golden Wind (season 4)
2018 (3rd)	Akiko Takase	Violet Evergarden
2018 (3rd)	Ayumi Kurashima, original design by Go Nagai	Devilman Crybaby
2018 (3rd)	Kasumi Fukagawa	Zombie Land Saga
2018 (3rd)	Hiroshi Shimizu, original design by Tetsuya Chiba	Megalo Box
2018 (3rd)	Yeti (for Sanrio)	Aggretsuko
2019 (4th)
2019 (4th)	Satoshi Iwataki, original design by Hiroyuki Asada	Dororo
2019 (4th)	Kayoko Ishikawa, original design by Miggy	Sarazanmai
2019 (4th)	Takahiko Abiru, original design by Makoto Yukimura	Vinland Saga
2019 (4th)	Tsunenori Saito, original design by Eisaku Kubonouchi	Carole & Tuesday
2019 (4th)	Yuko Iwasa, original design by Boichi	Dr. Stone
2019 (4th)	Yuko Yahiro, original design by Aka Akasaka	Kaguya-sama: Love Is War

=== 2020s ===
Year	Designer(s)	Anime
2020 (5th)
2020 (5th)	Mayuka Itou, original designs by Iro Aida	Toilet-Bound Hanako-kun
2020 (5th)	Genice Chan and Yuusuke Yoshigaki	BNA: Brand New Animal
2020 (5th)	Masashi Kudoh and Miho Tanino, original designs by SIU	Tower of God
2020 (5th)	Naoyuki Asano, original designs by Sumito Oowara	Keep Your Hands Off Eizouken!
2020 (5th)	Rumiko Takahashi and Yoshihito Hishinuma	Yashahime: Princess Half-Demon
2020 (5th)	Yoshiyuki Sadamoto and Hirotaka Katō	Great Pretender
2021 (6th)
2021 (6th)	Tadashi Hiramatsu, original designs by Gege Akutami	Jujutsu Kaisen (cour 2)
2021 (6th)	Michinori Chiba	SK8 the Infinity
2021 (6th)	Baku Kinoshita and Hiromi Nakayama	Odd Taxi
2021 (6th)	loundraw and Yuichi Takahashi	Vivy: Fluorite Eye's Song
2021 (6th)	Atsuko Nozaki, original designs by Sōsuke Tōka	Ranking of Kings
2021 (6th)	Saki Takahashi	Wonder Egg Priority
2021/2022 (7th)
2021/2022 (7th)	Akira Matsushima, original design by Koyoharu Gotouge	Demon Slayer: Kimetsu no Yaiba Entertainment District Arc (season 2 cour 2)
2021/2022 (7th)	Yoh Yoshinari	Cyberpunk: Edgerunners
2021/2022 (7th)	Masanori Shino, original design by Hirohiko Araki	JoJo's Bizarre Adventure: Stone Ocean (season 5)
2021/2022 (7th)	Kazumasa Ishida, original design by Shinichi Fukuda	My Dress-Up Darling
2021/2022 (7th)	Atsuko Nozaki, original design by Sōsuke Tōka	Ranking of Kings (cour 2)
2021/2022 (7th)	Kazuaki Shimada, original design by Tatsuya Endo	Spy × Family
2022/2023 (8th)
2022/2023 (8th)	Sayaka Koiso and Tadashi Hiramatsu, original designs by Gege Akutami	Jujutsu Kaisen (season 2)
2022/2023 (8th)	Akira Matsushima, original designs by Koyoharu Gotouge	Demon Slayer: Kimetsu no Yaiba Swordsmith Village Arc (season 3)
2022/2023 (8th)	Kanna Hirayama, original designs by Mengo Yokoyari	Oshi no Ko
2022/2023 (8th)	Kazutaka Sugiyama, original designs by Tatsuki Fujimoto	Chainsaw Man
2022/2023 (8th)	Kouji Hisaki, original designs by Yuji Kaku	Hell's Paradise
2022/2023 (8th)	Kouji Tajima	Trigun Stampede
2023/2024 (9th)
2023/2024 (9th)	Naoyuki Onda, original designs by Yukinobu Tatsu	Dandadan
2023/2024 (9th)	Akira Matsushima, original designs by Koyoharu Gotouge	Demon Slayer: Kimetsu no Yaiba Hashira Training Arc (season 4)
2023/2024 (9th)	Naoki Takeda, original designs by Ryoko Kui	Delicious in Dungeon
2023/2024 (9th)	Reiko Nagasawa, original designs by Tsukasa Abe	Frieren: Beyond Journey's End
2023/2024 (9th)	Tetsuya Nishio, original designs by Naoya Matsumoto	Kaiju No. 8
2023/2024 (9th)	Yukiko Nakatani, original designs by Touko Shino	The Apothecary Diaries
2025 (10th)
2025 (10th)	Satoshi Ishino, original designs by Kei Urana	Gachiakuta
2025 (10th)	Naoyuki Onda, original designs by Yukinobu Tatsu	Dandadan (season 2)
2025 (10th)	Kazumasa Ishida, original designs by Shinichi Fukuda	My Dress-Up Darling (season 2)
2025 (10th)	Midori Matsuda, original designs by Eiichiro Oda	One Piece
2025 (10th)	Keita Nagahara, original designs by Taizan 5	Takopi's Original Sin
2025 (10th)	Yukiko Nakatani, original designs by Touko Shino	The Apothecary Diaries (season 2)

== Records ==
Designer	Wins	Nominations	Anime
Tadashi Hiramatsu	2		Jujutsu Kaisen (Season 1 cour 2, Season 2)
Akira Matsushima	1	3	Demon Slayer: Kimetsu no Yaiba (Entertainment District Arc, Swordsmith Village Arc, Hashira Training Arc)
Naoyuki Onda	1	2	Dandadan (Season 1, Season 2)
Atsuko Nozaki	0	2	Ranking of Kings (Cour 1, Cour 2)
Kazumasa Ishida	0	2	My Dress-Up Darling (Season 1, Season 2)
Yukiko Nakatani	0	2	The Apothecary Diaries (Season 1, Season 2)
