= Crunchyroll Anime Award for Best Director =

- Awarded for: Best directing of the previous year
- Country: United States; Japan
- First award: Masaaki Yuasa — Devilman Crybaby (2019)
- Currently held by: Akinori Fudesaka and Norihiro Naganuma — The Apothecary Diaries Season 2 (2026)

Highlights
- Most wins: Masaaki Yuasa (2)
- Most nominations: Yuichiro Hayashi (3)
- Website: Crunchyroll Anime Awards

The Crunchyroll Anime Award for Best Director is an above-the-line award given at the Crunchyroll Anime Awards since its third edition in 2019. It is given for the best directing in an anime series from the previous year. Winners are determined through a combined voting process by judges and public voting.

Science SARU's co-founder Masaaki Yuasa first won the award in 2019 for his direction of Devilman Crybaby, which also awarded the second time in 2021 for his direction of Keep Your Hands Off Eizouken!, the first anime director to win multiple awards and currently the oldest director to win. Yuichiro Hayashi holds the record for the most nominations—also the most nominations without a win—with 3 for his direction in the fourth and final season of Attack on Titan.

2 out of 8 anime series won the Best Director category together with Anime of the Year category, the highest award.

In the latest edition in 2026, Akinori Fudesaka and Norihiro Naganuma won the award for their direction in the second season of The Apothecary Diaries.

== Winners and nominees ==
In the following list, the first titles listed in gold are the winners; those not in gold are nominees, which are listed in alphabetical order. The years given are those in which the ceremonies took place.

=== 2010s ===
Year	Director(s)	Anime
2018 (3rd)
2018 (3rd)	Masaaki Yuasa	Devilman Crybaby
2018 (3rd)	Atsuko Ishizuka	A Place Further than the Universe
2018 (3rd)	Hiroko Utsumi	Banana Fish
2018 (3rd)	Yo Moriyama	Megalo Box
2018 (3rd)	Yohei Suzuki	Planet With
2018 (3rd)	Taichi Ishidate	Violet Evergarden
2019 (4th)
2019 (4th)	Tetsurō Araki and Masashi Koizuka	Attack on Titan (season 3)
2019 (4th)	Kiyotaka Suzuki	Babylon
2019 (4th)	Shinichirō Watanabe and Motonobu Hori	Carole & Tuesday
2019 (4th)	Yuzuru Tachikawa	Mob Psycho 100 II (season 2)
2019 (4th)	Kunihiko Ikuhara	Sarazanmai
2019 (4th)	Shuhei Yabuta	Vinland Saga

=== 2020s ===
Year	Director(s)	Anime
2020 (5th)
2020 (5th)	Masaaki Yuasa	Keep Your Hands Off Eizouken!
2020 (5th)	Yuzuru Tachikawa	Deca-Dence
2020 (5th)	Hiro Kaburagi	Great Pretender
2020 (5th)	Mamoru Hatakeyama	Kaguya-sama: Love is War? (season 2)
2020 (5th)	Sunghoo Park	Jujutsu Kaisen
2020 (5th)	Takashi Sano	Tower of God
2021 (6th)
2021 (6th)	Baku Kinoshita	Odd Taxi
2021 (6th)	Yuichiro Hayashi	Attack on Titan: The Final Season Part 1 (season 4)
2021 (6th)	Yo Moriyama	Megalobox 2: Nomad
2021 (6th)	Sunghoo Park	Jujutsu Kaisen (cour 2)
2021 (6th)	Shingo Natsume	Sonny Boy
2021 (6th)	Shin Wakabayashi	Wonder Egg Priority
2021/2022 (7th)
2021/2022 (7th)	Haruo Sotozaki	Demon Slayer: Kimetsu no Yaiba Entertainment District Arc (season 2 cour 2)
2021/2022 (7th)	Yuichiro Hayashi	Attack on Titan: The Final Season Part 2 (season 4 cour 2)
2021/2022 (7th)	Hiroyuki Imaishi	Cyberpunk: Edgerunners
2021/2022 (7th)	Shingo Adachi	Lycoris Recoil
2021/2022 (7th)	Yōsuke Hatta	Ranking of Kings (cour 2)
2021/2022 (7th)	Kazuhiro Furuhashi	Spy × Family
2022/2023 (8th)
2022/2023 (8th)	Shōta Goshozono	Jujutsu Kaisen (season 2)
2022/2023 (8th)	Yuichiro Hayashi	Attack on Titan: The Final Season The Final Chapters Special 1 (season 4 cour 3)
2022/2023 (8th)	Keiichirō Saitō	Bocchi the Rock!
2022/2023 (8th)	Ryu Nakayama	Chainsaw Man
2022/2023 (8th)	Hirotaka Mori	Heavenly Delusion
2022/2023 (8th)	Daisuke Hiramaki	Oshi no Ko
2023/2024 (9th)
2023/2024 (9th)	Keiichirō Saitō	Frieren: Beyond Journey's End
2023/2024 (9th)	Fūga Yamashiro	Dandadan
2023/2024 (9th)	Yoshihiro Miyajima	Delicious in Dungeon
2023/2024 (9th)	Haruo Sotozaki	Demon Slayer: Kimetsu no Yaiba Hashira Training Arc (season 4)
2023/2024 (9th)	Megumi Ishitani	One Piece Fan Letter
2023/2024 (9th)	Norihiro Naganuma	The Apothecary Diaries
2025 (10th)
2025 (10th)	Akinori Fudesaka and Norihiro Naganuma	The Apothecary Diaries (season 2)
2025 (10th)	Fūga Yamashiro and Abel Góngora	Dandadan (season 2)
2025 (10th)	Fumihiko Suganuma	Gachiakuta
2025 (10th)	Kenji Nagasaki and Naomi Nakayama	My Hero Academia: Final Season (season 8)
2025 (10th)	Ryōhei Takeshita	The Summer Hikaru Died
2025 (10th)	Shinya Iino	Takopi's Original Sin

== Records ==
=== Director ===
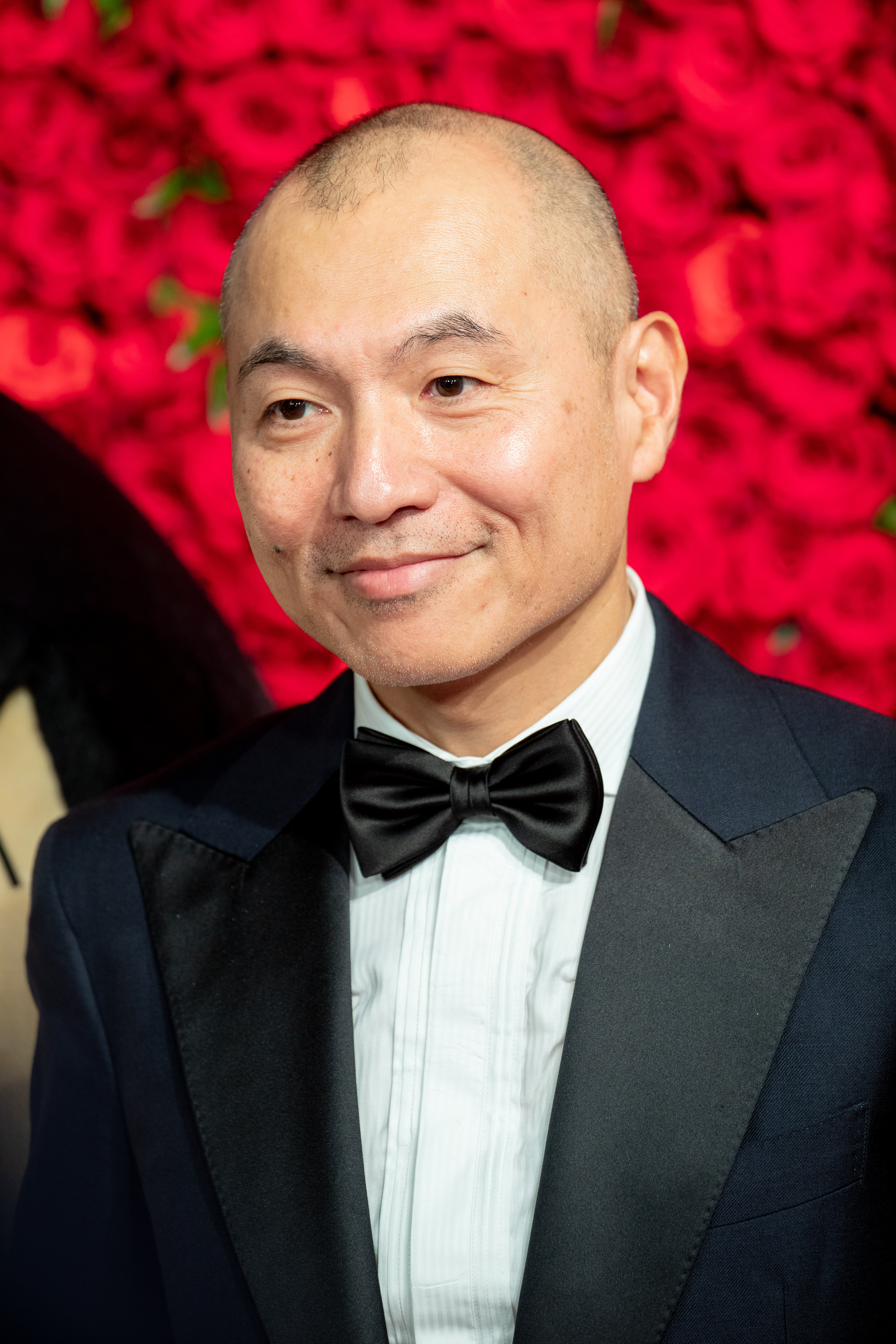
Masaaki Yuasa holds the record for the most wins.

Director	Wins	Nominations	Anime
Masaaki Yuasa	2		Devilman Crybaby, Keep Your Hands Off Eizouken!
Haruo Sotozaki	1	2	Demon Slayer: Kimetsu no Yaiba (Entertainment District Arc, Hashira Training Arc)
Keiichirō Saitō	1	2	Bocchi the Rock!, Frieren: Beyond Journey's End
Norihiro Naganuma	1	2	The Apothecary Diaries (Season 1, Season 2)
Yuichiro Hayashi	0	3	Attack on Titan (The Final Season Part 1, The Final Season Part 2, The Final Season The Final Chapters Special 1)
Fūga Yamashiro	0	2	Dandadan (Season 1, Season 2)
Sunghoo Park	0	2	Jujutsu Kaisen (Season 1 cour 1, Season 1 cour 2)
Yo Moriyama	0	2	Megalo Box, Megalobox 2: Nomad
Yuzuru Tachikawa	0	2	Deca-Dence, Mob Psycho 100 (Season 2)

=== Age ===
Superlative	Recipient	Anime	Age
Oldest winner	Masaaki Yuasa	Keep Your Hands Off Eizouken!	55
Oldest nominee	Masaaki Yuasa	Keep Your Hands Off Eizouken!	55
Youngest winner	Keiichirō Saitō	Frieren: Beyond Journey's End	32
Youngest nominee	Keiichirō Saitō	Bocchi the Rock!	31
