= 3rd Crunchyroll Anime Awards =

2019 award ceremony

- Awarded for: Excellence in anime
- Date: February 16, 2019
- Country: United States
- Presented by: Crunchyroll
- Hosted by: Cristina Vee

Highlights
- Most wins: My Hero Academia (4)
- Most nominations: Megalobox (8)
- Anime of the Year: Devilman Crybaby
- Best Film: My Hero Academia: Two Heroes

The 3rd Crunchyroll Anime Awards were held on February 16, 2019, honoring excellence in anime from 2018. Crunchyroll announced the details for the third edition of the awards on December 4, 2018. The list of judges as well as the categories to be presented were announced on December 17. Public voting was conducted from January 11 to 18. Winners were announced on February 16 via a livestream on Twitch. The show was hosted by voice actress Cristina Vee. Several prominent figures in the industry and community were invited to presented the awards, including Kevin Penkin, who previously won the 2018 award for Best Score.

This edition featured 15 categories, including new industry-related categories such as Best VA Performance for both Japanese and English, Best Character Design, and Best Director. However, the award for Best Score was not given. It also dropped genre-specific awards such as Best Drama and Best Comedy, as well as the categories first introduced in the previous edition such as Best CGI and Best Manga. The award for Best Fight Scene was reinstated after it was dropped in the previous edition. Megalo Box received the most nominations at eight, followed by Devilman Crybaby at seven and Aggretsuko and Violet Evergarden both at six. Japanese rock band The Pillows received two nominations in the Best Ending Sequence for the second and third seasons of FLCL, the first band and anime to do so.

Devilman Crybaby won the Anime of the Year. Its director, Masaaki Yuasa, won the inaugural Best Director award. My Hero Academia's Izuku Midoriya won the Best Boy award after being nominated for the third straight time. The franchise also received the most wins. Mamoru Miyano won the inaugural Best VA Performance (JP) award for his role as Kotaro Tatsumi in Zombie Land Saga, while Christopher Sabat received his second award as he won the Best VA Performance (EN) award for role as All Might in My Hero Academia. Character designer Takahiro Kishida won the inaugural Best Character Design award for his work on JoJo's Bizarre Adventure: Golden Wind. My Hero Academia was also nominated for the third straight time in the Best Animation category; however, it was won by Violet Evergarden. Its theatrical film Two Heroes won Best Film. Masahiko Minami, producer and Bones' president, received the Industry Icon award. He attended the show personally to accept the award.

== Winners and nominees ==
Winners are listed first, highlighted in boldface, and indicated with a double dagger (‡). The lists are arranged alphabetically, except for the winner.

**Anime of the Year**: **Devilman Crybaby — Science SARU**‡; A Place Further than the Universe — Madhouse; Hinamatsuri — Feel; Megalobox — TMS Entertainment; Violet Evergarden — Kyoto Animation; Zombie Land Saga — MAPPA	**Best Film**: **My Hero Academia: Two Heroes — Bones**‡; The Night Is Short, Walk On Girl — Science SARU; Mirai — Studio Chizu; Liz and the Blue Bird — Kyoto Animation; Mazinger Z: Infinity — Toei Animation; Fireworks — Shaft
**Best Protagonist**: **Rimuru Tempest — That Time I Got Reincarnated as a Slime**‡; Joe — Megalobox; Retsuko — Aggretsuko; Sakuta Azusagawa — Rascal Does Not Dream of Bunny Girl Senpai; Violet Evergarden — Violet Evergarden; Yumeko Jabami — Kakegurui – Compulsive Gambler	**Best Antagonist**: **All For One — My Hero Academia (season 3)**‡; Akane Shinjo — SSSS.Gridman; Momonga — Overlord (season 3); Ryo Asuka — Devilman Crybaby; Tokushiro Tsurumi — Golden Kamuy; Yuri — Megalobox
**Best Boy**: **Izuku "Deku" Midoriya — My Hero Academia (season 3)**‡; Haida — Aggretsuko; Honda-san — Skull-face Bookseller Honda-san; Joe — Megalobox; Kotaro Tatsumi — Zombie Land Saga; Sakuta Azusagawa — Rascal Does Not Dream of Bunny Girl Senpai	**Best Girl**: **Mai Sakurajima — Rascal Does Not Dream of Bunny Girl Senpai**‡; Anzu Hayashi — Hinamatsuri; Asirpa — Golden Kamuy; Hinata Miyake — A Place Further than the Universe; Lily Hoshikawa — Zombie Land Saga; Nadeshiko Kagamihara — Laid-Back Camp
**Best Opening Sequence**: **"Kiss of Death" by Mika Nakashima x Hyde — Darling in the Franxx**‡; "Aggretsuko Theme" by Miura Jam — Aggretsuko; "Deal with the Devil" by Tia — Kakegurui – Compulsive Gambler; "Fiction" by Sumika — Wotakoi: Love Is Hard for Otaku; "Fighting Gold" by Coda — JoJo's Bizarre Adventure: Golden Wind (season 4); "Pop Team Epic" by Sumire Uesaka — Pop Team Epic	**Best Ending Sequence**: **"Akatsuki no Requiem" by Linked Horizon — Attack on Titan (season 3)**‡; "Fly Me to the Star" by Starlight Kukugumi — Revue Starlight; "Kakatte Koi yo" by NakamuraEmi — Megalobox; "Ref:rain" by Aimer — After the Rain; "Spiky Seeds" by The Pillows — FLCL Progressive (season 2); "Star Overhead" by The Pillows — FLCL Alternative (season 3)
**Best VA Performance (JP)**: **Mamoru Miyano as Kotaro Tatsumi — Zombie Land Saga**‡; Megumi Han as Miki Makimura — Devilman Crybaby; Nao Tōyama as Rin Shima — Laid-Back Camp; Rareko as Retsuko — Aggretsuko; Reina Ueda as Akane Shinjo — SSSS.Gridman; Soma Saito as Honda-san — Skull-face Bookseller Honda-san	**Best VA Performance (EN)**: **Christopher Sabat as All Might — My Hero Academia (season 3)**‡; David Wald as Narrator — Mr. Tonegawa: Middle Management Blues; Erica Mendez as Retsuko — Aggretsuko; Erika Harlacher as Violet Evergarden — Violet Evergarden; Kari Wahlgren as Haruko Haruhara — FLCL Progressive (season 2); Tia Ballard as Zero Two — Darling in the Franxx
**Best Director**: **Masaaki Yuasa — Devilman Crybaby**‡; Atsuko Ishizuka — A Place Further than the Universe; Hiroko Utsumi — Banana Fish; Taichi Ishidate — Violet Evergarden; Yohei Suzuki — Planet With; You Moriyama — Megalobox	**Best Animation**: **Violet Evergarden — Kyoto Animation**‡; A Place Further than the Universe — Madhouse; Bloom Into You — Troyca; Devilman Crybaby — Science SARU; Megalobox — TMS Entertainment; My Hero Academia (season 3) — Bones
**Best Character Design**: **Takahiro Kishida, original design by Hirohiko Araki — JoJo's Bizarre Adventure: Golden Wind (season 4)**‡; Akiko Takase — Violet Evergarden; Ayumi Kurashima, original design by Go Nagai — Devilman Crybaby; Kasumi Fukagawa — Zombie Land Saga; Hiroshi Shimizu, original design by Tetsuya Chiba — Megalobox; Yeti (for Sanrio) — Aggretsuko	**Best Fight Scene**: **All For One vs. All Might — My Hero Academia (season 3)**‡; Hina vs. Anzu — Hinamatsuri; Naruto & Sasuke vs. Momoshiki — Boruto: Naruto Next Generations; Jiren vs. Goku — Dragon Ball Super; Yami vs. Licht — Black Clover; Satan vs. Devilman — Devilman Crybaby
**Best Continuing Series**: **Dragon Ball Super — Toei Animation**‡; The Ancient Magus' Bride — Wit Studio; Black Clover — Pierrot; March Comes In like a Lion — Shaft; One Piece — Toei Animation; Boruto: Naruto Next Generations — Pierrot	**Industry Icon Award**: **Masahiko Minami**‡

== Statistics ==
Anime with multiple nominations
Nominations	Anime
8	Megalobox
7	Devilman Crybaby
6	Aggretsuko
6	Violet Evergarden
5	My Hero Academia (season 3)
5	Zombie Land Saga
4	A Place Further than the Universe
3	Hinamatsuri
3	Rascal Does Not Dream of Bunny Girl Senpai
2	Black Clover
2	Boruto: Naruto Next Generations
2	Darling in the Franxx
2	Dragon Ball Super
2	FLCL Progressive (season 3)
2	Golden Kamuy
2	JoJo's Bizarre Adventure: Golden Wind (season 4)
2	Kakegurui – Compulsive Gambler
2	Laid-Back Camp
2	Skull-face Bookseller Honda-san
2	SSSS.Gridman

Anime with multiple wins
Wins	Anime
4	My Hero Academia (season 3)
2	Devilman Crybaby
