= Make My Day (TV series) =

2023 science fiction anime series

- Genre: Science fiction; Horror
- Created by: Yasuo Ohtagaki
- Original net animation
- Directed by: Makoto Honda
- Written by: Yumiko Yoshizawa
- Music by: Kensuke Ushio
- Studio: 5 Inc.
- Licensed by: Netflix
- Released: February 2, 2023
- Episodes: 8

Make My Day is a Japanese animated television series produced for Netflix. It features an original story by Yasuo Ohtagaki. Makoto Honda was the director for the series, and 5 Inc. animated and provided character designs. The series was released on February 2, 2023.

== Premise ==
A prison has been established on a freezing cold planet where the prisoners are forced to work in a large mine. One day mysterious creatures come up from the mine and attack the prisoners.

== Voice cast ==
| Character | Cast | |
| Character | Japanese | English |
|---|---|---|
| Jim | Masaomi Yamahashi | Zeno Robinson |
| Marnie | Ayahi Takagaki | Angel Malhotra |
| Walter | Kazuhiro Yamaji | Tony Pasqualini |
| Commander Bark | Akio Otsuka | James C. Mathis III |
| Cathy Beck | Atsuko Tanaka | Pilar Uribe |

== Episodes ==
| No. | Title | Directed by | Original release date |
|---|---|---|---|
| 1 | "Episode 1" | Takahiro Tanaka | February 2, 2023 |
| 2 | "Episode 2" | Kentarō Fujita | February 2, 2023 |
| 3 | "Episode 3" | Tatsuji Yamazaki | February 2, 2023 |
| 4 | "Episode 4" | Takahiro Tanaka | February 2, 2023 |
| 5 | "Episode 5" | Kentarō Fujita | February 2, 2023 |
| 6 | "Episode 6" | 5 Inc., Kohei Sugatani | February 2, 2023 |
| 7 | "Episode 7" | 5 Inc., Grace Chen, Mntn Chang | February 2, 2023 |
| 8 | "Episode 8" | 5 Inc., Yuichi Abe | February 2, 2023 |

== Production ==
Netflix first announced the project as part of their Geeked Week in June 2021. The story was written by Yasuo Ohtagaki, Makoto Honda directed, and animation and character designs are done by 5 Inc. At the 2022 Geeked Week, Netflix released a first look at some character screenshots, alongside their voice actors, and the design of the mecha Casper by Ohtagaki and Shoji Kawamori. Yumiko Yoshizawa wrote the script and Kensuke Ushio composed the music.

== Release ==
Make My Day was originally announced as an animated film, but in January 2023, Netflix announced that it would be a series instead. The series was released in full on February 2, 2023.

== Reception ==
Make My Day received mixed reviews. The series was praised for having a character development and impactful narrative, despite seeming to take on too much, but it was also called formulaic and predictable. The animation was called "subpar", yet it was also highlighted for its ability to convey real emotions for a breathtaking and immersive experience.
