= Dandadan (TV series) =

Japanese anime television series

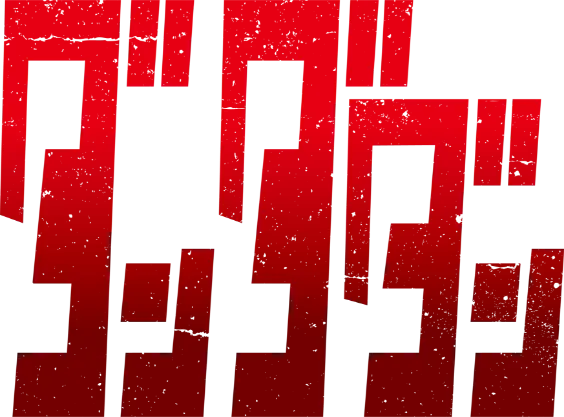
- ダンダダン
- Genre: Action; Romantic comedy; Supernatural thriller
- Based on: Dandadan by Yukinobu Tatsu
- Directed by: Fūga Yamashiro; Abel Góngora (S2)
- Screenplay by: Hiroshi Seko
- Music by: Kensuke Ushio
- Voices of: Shion Wakayama; Natsuki Hanae; Nana Mizuki; Ayane Sakura; Kaito Ishikawa; Mayumi Tanaka
- Opening themes: List: "Otonoke" by Creepy Nuts (S1); "Kakumei Dōchū" by Aina the End (S2)
- Ending themes: List: "Taidada" by Zutomayo (S1); "Doukashiteru" by WurtS (S2)
- No. of seasons: 2
- No. of episodes: 24 (list of episodes)

Production
- Cinematographer: Kazuto Izumita
- Editor: Kiyoshi Hirose
- Studio: Science Saru
- Producers: List: Toshihiro Maeda (chief); Tatsuro Hayashi (chief); Hayato Saga (chief); Masanori Fujita (chief; S2); Hiroshi Kamei; Hiroyuki Aoi; Kōhei Sakita; Yoshiko Makabe; Sōichirō Saitō; Tatsuya Ishikawa; Takako Yamamori; Hiroshi Mutō (S1); Satoshi Suzuki (S2)
- Production companies: Dandadan Production Committee (Note: Label consisting of numerous companies)
- Runtime: 24 minutes

Original release
- Networks: MBS, TBS
- Release: October 4, 2024 – present

Related
- Dan Da Dan: First Encounter (2024); Dan Da Dan: Evil Eye (2025)

Dandadan (ダンダダン), also written as DAN DA DAN, is a Japanese anime television series produced by Science Saru, based on the manga series Dandadan by Yukinobu Tatsu. The anime series is directed by Fūga Yamashiro and written by Hiroshi Seko, with character designs by Naoyuki Onda and alien and supernatural entity designs by Yoshimichi Kameda. The music is composed by Kensuke Ushio.

The series was broadcast on the Super Animeism Turbo timeslot on MBS, TBS, and their affiliates. The first season aired from October 4 to December 20, 2024, while the second season aired from July 4 to September 19, 2025. Crunchyroll and Netflix licensed the series for worldwide streaming. In the United States, the series also airs English dubbed on Adult Swim's Toonami programming block. A third season was announced in December 2025 during Jump Festa 2026, and is set to premiere in 2027.

The series has received critical acclaim from critics and audiences for its animation, characters, visuals, storytelling, musical score, and voice acting.

== Synopsis ==
Momo Ayase, a high school girl who believes in ghosts, and Ken "Okarun" Takakura, a boy who believes in aliens, make a bet to see who is right. After visiting hotspots for both, they discover that both ghosts and aliens exist. Momo awakens her psychokinetic powers, while Okarun becomes cursed by the Turbo Granny, giving him supernatural speed and transformation abilities. Together, they fight various entities to reclaim Okarun's "spiritual essentials."

== Series overview ==
Season	Episodes	Originally released	
Season	Episodes	First released	Last released
1	12	October 4, 2024	December 20, 2024
2	12	July 4, 2025	September 19, 2025

== Cast and characters ==
Character	Japanese	English
Momo Ayase (綾瀬 桃, Ayase Momo)	Shion Wakayama	Abby Trott
Ken "Okarun" Takakura (高倉 健, Takakura Ken)	Natsuki Hanae	A.J. Beckles
Seiko Ayase (綾瀬 星子, Ayase Seiko)	Nana Mizuki	Kari Wahlgren
Aira Shiratori (白鳥 愛羅, Shiratori Aira)	Ayane Sakura	Lisa Reimold
Jin "Jiji" Enjoji (円城寺 仁, Enjoji Jin)	Kaito Ishikawa	Aleks Le
Turbo Granny (ターボババア, Tābo Babā)	Mayumi Tanaka	Barbara Goodson
Serpoian (セルポ星人, Serupo Seijin)	Kazuya Nakai	Benjamin Diskin

== Production and release ==
The Dandadan anime television series adaptation was announced in November 2023. It is produced by Science Saru and directed by Fūga Yamashiro, with series composition and episode screenplays by Hiroshi Seko, character designs by Naoyuki Onda, and alien and supernatural entity designs by Yoshimichi Kameda. It is the directorial debut of Yamashiro. Producer Hiroshi Kamei noted that Yamashiro would often take notes while watching other media for reference. Kamei highlighted the anime's use of "small moments" where the camera lingers on characters' expressions, a technique the staff termed "everyday action" or "everyday direction". This approach was prioritized to convey subtle interactions visually rather than through dialogue. The production also employed "lead scenes," where a specific action foreshadows a later, similar one to illustrate character development. An example cited is Momo handing Okarun his magazine, which is later mirrored when Okarun hands his clothes to Momo, demonstrating the evolution of their relationship through parallel gestures.

The first season aired for 12 episodes from October 4 to December 20, 2024, on the Super Animeism Turbo programming block on all JNN affiliates, including flagship stations MBS and TBS. (Note: MBS and TBS listed the series premiere as 24:26 on October 3, 2024, which is effectively October 4 at 12:26 a.m. JST.) Prior to the television airing, the English dub of the series premiered at Anime NYC on August 24, 2024. The first three episodes also were collected and released theatrically outside of Japan as Dan Da Dan: First Encounter, with screenings starting in Asia on August 31.

After the airing of the first-season finale, a second season was announced. It aired for 12 episodes from July 4 to September 19, 2025. (Note: MBS and TBS listed the season premiere as 24:26 on July 3, 2025, which is effectively July 4 at 12:26 a.m. JST.) Abel Góngora co-directed the season with Yamashiro. Crunchyroll and Netflix announced that they would stream the season worldwide, while Hulu and ADN are streaming it in the United States and several European territories, respectively. The season's first three episodes were released in theaters outside of Japan under the title Dan Da Dan: Evil Eye on May 30 in Asia, June 6 in North America, and on June 7 in Europe.

After the airing of the second-season finale, a third season was announced. It is set to premiere in 2027.

=== International release ===
Logo of anime for the international release

Crunchyroll is streaming the series outside of Asia, including the Middle East and CIS, while Netflix is streaming the series globally alongside Hulu in the United States and Animation Digital Network in several European territories. Muse Communication licensed the series in Asia-Pacific. In June 2024, GKIDS announced that it had acquired the theatrical, videogram, and digital transactional rights to the series. The English dub of the series made its broadcast television premiere in the United States on Adult Swim's Toonami programming block on July 27, 2025. In August 2024, prior to the premiere of the English dub, the first two episodes of the anime were leaked alongside many other anime productions that were localized by Iyuno. Episodes 3–6 were later leaked prior to the anime's premiere.

== Music ==
The series's musical score is composed by Kensuke Ushio. The first season's opening theme song is "Otonoke" (オトノケ), performed by Creepy Nuts, while the ending theme song is "Taidada", performed by Zutomayo.

For the second season, the opening theme song is "Kakumei Dōchū" (革命道中; lit. 'On the Way'), performed by Aina the End, while the ending theme song is "Doukashiteru" (どうかしてる; lit. 'Something's Wrong with Them'), performed by WurtS.

== Reception ==
=== Popularity ===
The show garnered high streaming viewership: the Japanese platforms Abema TV and Niconico reported that the series ranked as the second and fourth most-watched title during the Fall 2024 and Summer 2025 anime seasons, respectively; the first season ranked as the most-watched anime on Netflix for the second half of 2024, with over 19.6 million views worldwide, while the second season also topped the most-watched animes ranking on the same platform during the second half of 2025, with over 17 million views; additionally, Nielsen revealed that the first season ranked as the most-watched anime series in the United States among viewers aged 18 to 49 from September 2024 to April 2025, garnering over 2.6 million viewers.

The official video for its first opening theme, "Otonoke" by Creepy Nuts, surpassed 74 million views on YouTube as of November 2025, becoming a key factor in the series's viral success prior to its premiere, according to Screen Rant.

=== Critical response ===
On review aggregator website Rotten Tomatoes, the first season of Dandadan holds an approval rating of 100% based on 15 reviews, with an average rating of 9.1/10. The site's critics consensus reads, "Gorgeously animated and bringing a big heart to go along with its bonkers imagination, Dan Da Dan comes roaring out of the gate as an exceptional Shōnen anime." The series premiere was positively received by nearly all the writers of Anime News Network. Caitlin Moore and James Beckett gave it a perfect score; Moore complimented Science Saru's animation, the dynamic between Momo and Okarun, and their voice acting while Beckett praised the studio in bringing the anime to life, noting its romcom tropes combining with horror and science fiction and Okarun's reference name. Richard Eisenbeis acknowledged the animation and story as he was enthusiastic about following the series. In contrast, while Rebecca Silverman agreed that the animation and visuals were great and premise was interesting, she did not enjoy the episode and expressed she was done with the series; she gave her reasons being the use of sudden bright lights and flashing images, a vast majority of the dialogue being "spoken in a scream", and the distasteful handling and depiction of the sexual assault scenes.

Mike Mamon of IGN praised the first three episodes of the anime for its animation, storytelling, visuals, direction, characters, and voice acting, concluding that "Dandadan's first three episodes manage to stick the landing by focusing more on the anime's lovable protagonists and less so on the absurdity of the occult and extraterrestrial world they inhabit." Toussaint Egan of Polygon praised the adaptation for its animation and character designs, while complimenting the studio's decision of elevating the visuals and color design in combining with art direction to the anime's action sequences. Vulture named Dandadan as one of the best anime series of 2024. Kambole Campbell praised the series for its humor, animation, colors, art direction, and Kensuke Ushio's musical score. The anime ranked second in Anime News Network's "Top 10 Anime of 2024". Furthermore, James Beckett applauded the series's premise, humor, action, production values, characters, and the chemistry between Momo and Okarun.

=== Accolades ===
Year	Award	Category	Recipient	Result	Ref.
2024	Abema Anime Trend Awards	Japan Anime Trend Award	Dandadan	Won	
2024	Abema Anime Trend Awards	Opening Animation Award	"Otonoke" by Creepy Nuts	Won	
2025	Reiwa Anisong Awards	Best Work Award	"Otonoke" by Creepy Nuts	Nominated	
2025	AT-X	Top Anime Ranking	Dandadan	6th place	
2025	TVer Awards	Special Award	Dandadan	Won	
2025	9th Crunchyroll Anime Awards	Anime of the Year	Dandadan	Nominated	
2025	9th Crunchyroll Anime Awards	Best New Series	Dandadan	Nominated	
2025	9th Crunchyroll Anime Awards	Best Action	Dandadan	Nominated	
2025	9th Crunchyroll Anime Awards	Best Animation	Dandadan	Nominated	
2025	9th Crunchyroll Anime Awards	Best Background Art	Dandadan	Nominated	
2025	9th Crunchyroll Anime Awards	Best Character Design	Naoyuki Onda	Won	
2025	9th Crunchyroll Anime Awards	Best Director	Fūga Yamashiro	Nominated	
2025	9th Crunchyroll Anime Awards	Best Main Character	Ken "Okarun" Takakura	Nominated	
2025	9th Crunchyroll Anime Awards	Best Main Character	Momo Ayase	Nominated	
2025	9th Crunchyroll Anime Awards	Best Supporting Character	Seiko Ayase	Nominated	
2025	9th Crunchyroll Anime Awards	Best Supporting Character	Turbo Granny	Nominated	
2025	9th Crunchyroll Anime Awards	"Must Protect at All Costs" Character	Ken "Okarun" Takakura	Nominated	
2025	9th Crunchyroll Anime Awards	Best Score	Kensuke Ushio	Nominated	
2025	9th Crunchyroll Anime Awards	Best Anime Song	"Otonoke" by Creepy Nuts	Won	
2025	9th Crunchyroll Anime Awards	Best Opening Sequence	"Otonoke" by Creepy Nuts	Won	
2025	9th Crunchyroll Anime Awards	Best Ending Sequence	"Taidada" by Zutomayo	Nominated	
2025	9th Crunchyroll Anime Awards	Best Voice Artist Performance (Japanese)	Shion Wakayama as Momo Ayase	Nominated	
2025	9th Crunchyroll Anime Awards	Best Voice Artist Performance (Japanese)	Natsuki Hanae as Ken "Okarun" Takakura	Nominated	
2025	9th Crunchyroll Anime Awards	Best Voice Artist Performance (English)	A.J. Beckles as Ken "Okarun" Takakura	Nominated	
2025	9th Crunchyroll Anime Awards	Best Voice Artist Performance (French)	Jaynelia Coadou as Momo Ayase	Nominated	
2025	9th Crunchyroll Anime Awards	Best Voice Artist Performance (German)	Franciska Friede as Momo Ayase	Nominated	
2025	9th Crunchyroll Anime Awards	Best Voice Artist Performance (Spanish)	Alicia Vélez as Momo Ayase	Nominated	
2025	5th Astra TV Awards	Best Anime Series	Dandadan	Nominated	
2025	Japan Expo Awards	Daruma for Best Anime	Dandadan	Won	
2025	Japan Expo Awards	Daruma for Best Action Anime	Dandadan	Won	
2025	Japan Expo Awards	Daruma for Best Original Soundtrack	Kensuke Ushio	Nominated	
2025	Japan Expo Awards	Daruma for Best Opening	"Otonoke" by Creepy Nuts	Won	
2025	Japan Expo Awards	Daruma for Best Ending	"Taidada" by Zutomayo	Nominated	
2025	47th Anime Grand Prix	Best Theme Song	"Otonoke" by Creepy Nuts	2nd place	
2025	20th AnimaniA Awards	Best TV Series: Online	Dandadan	Nominated	
2025	20th AnimaniA Awards	Best Director	Fūga Yamashiro	Nominated	
2025	20th AnimaniA Awards	Best Studio	Science Saru	Nominated	
2025	20th AnimaniA Awards	Best Anime Song	"Otonoke" by Creepy Nuts	Nominated	
2025	15th Newtype Anime Awards	Best Work (TV / Streaming)	Dandadan	7th place	
2025	TikTok Awards Japan	Anime of the Year	Dandadan	Nominated	
2025	31st Manga Barcelona Awards	Best Anime Series Premiere	Dandadan	Nominated	
2025	IGN Awards	Best Anime Series	Dandadan Season 2	Runner-up	
2025	Abema Anime Trend Awards	Ending Animation Award	"Doukashiteru" by WurtS	Won	
2025	67th Japan Record Awards	Excellent Work Awards	"Kakumei Dōchū" by Aina the End	Won	
2026	8th Global Demand Awards	Most In-Demand Anime Series of 2025	Dandadan	Nominated	
2026	Reiwa Anisong Awards	Lyrics Award	"Kakumei Dōchū" by Aina the End (Note: Aina the End and Shin Sakiura were credited as the nominees.)	Nominated	
2026	Reiwa Anisong Awards	Anikara Award	"Kakumei Dōchū" by Aina the End	Nominated	
2026	53rd Annie Awards	Best Direction – TV / Media	Fūga Yamashiro and Abel Góngora (for "Clash! Space Kaiju vs. Giant Robot!")	Nominated	
2026	Tokyo Anime Award Festival	Best Animator	Shūto Enomoto	Won	
2026	20th Seiyu Awards	Best Actor in a Leading Role	Shion Wakayama as Momo Ayase	Won	
2026	10th Crunchyroll Anime Awards	Anime of the Year	Dandadan Season 2	Nominated	
2026	10th Crunchyroll Anime Awards	Best Continuing Series	Dandadan Season 2	Nominated	
2026	10th Crunchyroll Anime Awards	Best Action	Dandadan Season 2	Nominated	
2026	10th Crunchyroll Anime Awards	Best Comedy	Dandadan Season 2	Won	
2026	10th Crunchyroll Anime Awards	Best Romance	Dandadan Season 2	Nominated	
2026	10th Crunchyroll Anime Awards	Best Animation	Dandadan Season 2	Nominated	
2026	10th Crunchyroll Anime Awards	Best Background Art	Dandadan Season 2	Nominated	
2026	10th Crunchyroll Anime Awards	Best Character Design	Naoyuki Onda	Nominated	
2026	10th Crunchyroll Anime Awards	Best Director	Fūga Yamashiro and Abel Góngora	Nominated	
2026	10th Crunchyroll Anime Awards	Best Main Character	Ken "Okarun" Takakura	Nominated	
2026	10th Crunchyroll Anime Awards	Best Main Character	Momo Ayase	Nominated	
2026	10th Crunchyroll Anime Awards	Best Supporting Character	Jin "Jiji" Enjoji	Nominated	
2026	10th Crunchyroll Anime Awards	Best Supporting Character	Turbo Granny	Nominated	
2026	10th Crunchyroll Anime Awards	Best Score	Kensuke Ushio	Nominated	
2026	10th Crunchyroll Anime Awards	Best Anime Song	"On the Way" by Aina the End	Nominated	
2026	10th Crunchyroll Anime Awards	Best Opening Sequence	"On the Way" by Aina the End	Won	
2026	10th Crunchyroll Anime Awards	Best Ending Sequence	"Doukashiteru" by WurtS	Nominated	
2026	10th Crunchyroll Anime Awards	Best Voice Artist Performance (Castilian Spanish)	Joel Gómez Jiménez as Ken "Okarun" Takakura	Nominated	
2026	10th Crunchyroll Anime Awards	Best Voice Artist Performance (French)	Véronique Augereau as Seiko Ayase	Nominated	
2026	10th Crunchyroll Anime Awards	Best Voice Artist Performance (Italian)	Katia Sorrentino as Momo Ayase	Nominated	
2026	Music Awards Japan	Song of the Year	"Kakumei Dōchū" by Aina the End	Nominated	
2026	Music Awards Japan	Best J-Pop Song	"Kakumei Dōchū" by Aina the End	Nominated	
2026	Music Awards Japan	Best Anime Song	"Kakumei Dōchū" by Aina the End	Nominated	
2026	Music Awards Japan	Top Japanese Song in Europe	"Kakumei Dōchū" by Aina the End	Nominated	
2026	Music Awards Japan	Top Japanese Song in Europe	"Otonoke" by Creepy Nuts	Nominated	
2026	Music Awards Japan	Top Japanese Song in North America	"Otonoke" by Creepy Nuts	Nominated	
2026	Music Awards Japan	Top Japanese Song in Latin America	"Kakumei Dōchū" by Aina the End	Nominated	
2026	Music Awards Japan	Top Japanese Song in Latin America	"Otonoke" by Creepy Nuts	Nominated	
2026	Music Awards Japan	Best Music Video	"Kakumei Dōchū" by Aina the End	Nominated	
2026	Music Awards Japan	Best Cover Artwork	"Kakumei Dōchū" by Aina the End	Nominated	
2026	Japan Expo Awards	Daruma for Best Original Soundtrack	Dandadan Season 2	Nominated	
2026	Japan Expo Awards	Daruma for Best Opening	"On the Way" by Aina the End	Won	
2026	Japan Expo Awards	Daruma for Best Ending	"Doukashiteru" by WurtS	Nominated	
2026	21st AnimaniA Awards	Best TV Sequel Series: Online	Dandadan Season 2	Nominated	
2026	21st AnimaniA Awards	Best TV / Movie: Disc Release	Dandadan	Nominated	
2026	21st AnimaniA Awards	Best Anime Song	"Kakumei Dōchū" by Aina the End	Nominated	
2026	MTV Video Music Awards Japan	Video of the Year	"Kakumei Dōchū" by Aina the End	Nominated	
2026	MTV Video Music Awards Japan	Best Solo Artist Video (Japan)	"Kakumei Dōchū" by Aina the End	Won	
