= Abel Góngora =

Spanish animator and director

- Born: July 30, 1983 (age 43); Barcelona, Spain
- Occupations: Animator, director
- Years active: 2006–present
- Known for: Star Wars: Visions - T0-B1
- Website: https://www.sciencesaru.com

Abel Góngora (born July 30, 1983) is a Spanish animator and director based in Japan who is known for his work with the Japanese animation studio Science Saru. Having joined the studio as one of its first employees, Góngora serves as the head of Science Saru's digital animation department and has specialized in the use of Adobe Animate. In addition to his work as an animator, Góngora has also served as an episode director for promotional episodes of the American series OK K.O.! Let's Be Heroes, and as the director of T0-B1, a short film segment of the Disney+ anthology project Star Wars: Visions.

== Early life ==
Góngora was born in Barcelona, Spain, and grew up in the town of Elche. As a child, he developed a love of drawing comics and aspired to someday own a shop where he could sell them. He studied animation and graduated from the Technical University of Valencia.

== Career ==
=== Work with European studios ===
Góngora began his career in Europe, joining the Irish animation studio Cartoon Saloon in 2006. He initially served as a location designer and later became an animator, working on the television series Skunk Fu! (2007–2008). In 2007, Góngora moved to the French animation studio Ankama, where he worked as an animator on the initial seasons of the company's Flash-animated series Wakfu (2008–2012). During his time at Ankama, the studio opened a Japan-based subsidiary, Ankama Japan, and relocated a group of 25 European animators to the Tokyo studio to work with a team of Japanese artists. Góngora was one of the animators who temporarily moved to Tokyo; while there, he worked with director Masaaki Yuasa, who would later co-found Science Saru. After Ankama Japan closed in 2011, Góngora returned to the main Ankama studio in France. However, he remained in touch with Yuasa and his producer associate Eunyoung Choi, and following the foundation of Science Saru in 2013, joined the new company.

=== Work at Science Saru ===
Góngora was one of the first five staff members to join Science Saru, including Choi and Yuasa. An admirer of Yuasa since his work on the animated series Kemonozume (2006), Góngora was eager to work with him due to his distinctive artistic aesthetic and directorial style. Unlike other Japanese animation studios which have focused either on traditional hand drawn animation or computer animation, Science Saru prioritizes the use of 'digitally assisted animation' which combines hand drawn and digital animation using programs such as Adobe Animate; an advantage of this production method is enabling efficiency with a small team.

Góngora began his work with Science Saru on the studio's first project, an episode of the American Adventure Time animated series entitled Food Chain (2014); he served as one of three animators on the episode. He next served as a digital animator on the television series Ping Pong the Animation (2014); Science Saru provided 'digitally assisted' animation production services, while Tatsunoko Production served as the primary studio. Góngora made his directorial debut with a trio of promotional episodes for the American animated series OK K.O.!: Let's Be Heroes (2015–17). A later directing assignment was the creation of the second opening credit sequence for Garo: Vanishing Line (2017–18), which Góngora also storyboarded and animated. Thanks to these early experiences, Góngora quickly became the leader of digital animation at the studio, eventually becoming the studio's lead digital artist. As the studio transitioned to larger projects, Góngora served as the head of digital animation on Science Saru's feature film productions Lu over the Wall (2017) and The Night Is Short, Walk On Girl (2017), the Netflix series Devilman Crybaby (2018), and the feature film Ride Your Wave (2019). In 2020, Góngora won praise for his creation of the opening credit sequence for Keep Your Hands Off Eizouken! (2020), which subsequently inspired internet memes, received over 10 million views on Crunchyroll's official YouTube channel, and was nominated for Best Opening Sequence at the 5th Crunchyroll Anime Awards in 2021.

In July 2021, Góngora was announced as the director of T0-B1, a short film segment of the animated anthology project Star Wars: Visions (2021). The film centers on a droid who dreams of becoming a Jedi, and pays homage to the classic art style of Osamu Tezuka, the innovative manga creator, director, and artist who helped define the look of Japanese animation. Upon joining the project, Góngora was presented with a unique opportunity: the ability to create, with "almost no limitation," a story within the Star Wars universe that could represent his visual and narrative interests. Ultimately, Góngora settled on merging the visual style and sensibility of Japanese animation of the 1960s with the live-action feature film traditions of the 1970s, which the original Star Wars Trilogy represented. The film was released worldwide on Disney+ on September 22, 2021. The Star Wars: Visions anthology as a whole received universal acclaim, and T0-B1 was the subject of particularly strong praise, with Juan Barquin of The A.V. Club heralding the film as "charming, heartbreaking, and inspiring all at once, and proof that a short film can hold more weight than some of Star Wars' features themselves."

In January 2022, it was announced that Góngora would serve as director for an anime series adaptation of the Scott Pilgrim graphic novels for Netflix. Góngora along with Fūga Yamashiro, were nominated in Best Director for its second season of Dandadan at the 10th Crunchyroll Anime Awards in 2026.

== Works ==
Year	Title	Format	Director	Storyboard Artist	Digital Animation Supervisor	Digital Animator	Location Designer	Notes
2007–08	Skunk Fu!	TV series				Yes (episodes 14–26)	Yes (episodes 1–11, 13-26)	
2008	Wakfu	TV series				Yes		
2014	Adventure Time: Food Chain	TV Episode				Yes		
2014	Ping Pong The Animation	TV series				Yes		
2014	Crayon Shin-chan: Intense Battle! Robo Dad Strikes Back	Feature Film				Yes ("Giant Hiroshi Robot Battle" sequence)		
2014	Yo-kai Watch: The Movie	Feature Film				Yes		
2014–15	Garo: The Animation	TV series			Yes (opening credit sequence 2)			
2015	Song of Four Seasons	Music Video				Yes		
2015	Crayon Shin-chan: My Moving Story! Cactus Large Attack!	Feature Film				Yes (animation assistance)		
2016–17	OK K.O.!: Let's Be Heroes	TV series Promotional Episodes	Yes (episodes 1, 4, 8)					
2017	The Night Is Short, Walk On Girl	Feature Film			Yes (Flash animation chief)			
2017	Lu Over the Wall	Feature Film			Yes (Flash animation chief)			
2017–2018	Garo: Vanishing Line	TV series	Yes (opening credit sequence 2)	Yes (opening credit sequence 2)		Yes (opening credit sequences 1 & 2)		
2018	Devilman Crybaby	Original Net Animation		Yes (episode 3)	Yes (Flash animation chief)	Yes		
2019	Ride Your Wave	Feature Film			Yes (Flash animation chief)			
2019–20	Super Shiro	Original Net Animation			Yes	Yes (episodes 1–2)		
2020	Keep Your Hands Off Eizouken!	TV series				Yes (opening credit sequence)		
2021	Star Wars: Visions - T0-B1	Short Film	Yes	Yes				
2023	Scott Pilgrim Takes Off	Original Net Animation	Yes					
2025	Dandadan (season 2)	TV series	Yes (Co-directed with Fūga Yamashiro)					
2026	Jaadugar: A Witch in Mongolia	TV series	Yes (Co-directed with Naoko Yamada)					
