= Kensuke Ushio =

Japanese composer

Kensuke Ushio 牛尾 憲輔
- Also known as: Agraph
- Born: Kensuke Ushio; March 1, 1983 (age 43); Tokyo, Japan
- Genres: Techno; rock; metal; electronica; breakbeat; minimalism; soundtrack
- Occupations: Composer; DJ; programmer
- Years active: 2007–present
- Labels: Ki/oon Records; Kuan Music; Beat Recordings
- Member of: Lama
- Website: agraph.jp

Kensuke Ushio (Japanese: 牛尾 憲輔, Hepburn: Ushio Kensuke; born March 1, 1983) (stylized as kensuke ushio) is a Japanese composer, rock and EBM musician. He also releases work under the moniker Agraph.

He is a member of Japanese rock band Lama. Together with Lama, he released two full-length studio records: New! in 2011 and Modanica a year later. Both albums charted on the Oricon Albums Chart.

As an EBM musician, he released three albums, all of which peaked in the Japanese Albums Chart. He wrote and composed soundtracks for several anime television series and movies, such as A Silent Voice, Chainsaw Man, Devilman Crybaby, Liz and the Blue Bird, The Dangers in My Heart and Dandadan.

== Biography ==
As a child, Ushio learned playing piano. He studied arts and music at university. At the same time, he learned the usage of the audio editor software Pro Tools. At the age of 20, Ushio got his first contact with electronic music, such as techno. He started his solo career in 2007 under the moniker Agraph and began creating electronic music. His debut album A Day, Phases, which was produced by Takkyu Ishino, was released in December 2008. Two years later, his second album Equal was released, which ranked in the Japanese Albums Charts. In 2011, Ushio and some former musicians of bands like Supercar and Number Girl formed a rock band called Lama. The band released two albums, which both ranked on the official Albums Charts of Japan.

Due to his involvement in Lama, Ushio's third album named The Shader was released in 2016, six years after his second album. Ushio works as composer of film music as well, with a particular focus on animated projects. Among his film and television credits are music composition for Space Dandy (2014), A Silent Voice (2016), Liz and the Blue Bird (2018), and Boogiepop and Others (2019). He is a frequent collaborator of directors Masaaki Yuasa and Naoko Yamada, as well as the animation studio Science Saru, for which he has composed the scores of Ping Pong the Animation (2014), Devilman Crybaby (2018), Japan Sinks: 2020 (2020), and The Heike Story (2021). For The Heike Story, Ushio combined ambient with traditional Japanese instruments that aren't featured in the western musical scale, with an emphasis on the biwa per the director's request. In December 2021, Ushio was confirmed as the composer for MAPPA's anime adaptation of Tatsuki Fujimoto's manga series Chainsaw Man, which premiered on October 12, 2022, on TV Tokyo and other networks. Ushio considered the soundtrack to be a challenge, having never written a score for a series based on a popular shonen manga at the time. He also collaborated with Sony Computer Science Laboratories to create a custom program as he sought to combine drum patterns with chainsaw samples. Ushio arranged music for the Distant Future chapter of the Live a Live remake, originally composed by Yoko Shimomura, marking his first work on a video game. The game released on July 22, 2022.

== Discography ==
=== Solo ===
Year	Album
2008	A Day, Phases
2010	Equal
2016	The Shader

=== Lama ===
Year	Album
2011	Now
2012	Modanica

== Works ==
=== Anime / television ===
Year	Title
2014	Space Dandy
2014	Ping Pong the Animation
2016	A Silent Voice (A Shape of Light)
2018	Sanī/32
2018	Devilman Crybaby
2018	Liz and the Blue Bird
2019	Boogiepop and Others
2020	Japan Sinks: 2020
2021	Words Bubble Up Like Soda Pop
2021	The Heike Story
2022	Chainsaw Man
2023	Make My Day
2023	The Dangers in My Heart
2023	Heavenly Delusion
2024	The Colors Within
2024	Dandadan
2024	Orb: On the Movements of the Earth
2025	Cocoon
2025	Chainsaw Man – The Movie: Reze Arc
2025	The Ghost Writer's Wife
2026	Journal with Witch
2026	Agents of the Four Seasons: Dance of Spring

=== Video games ===
Year	Title	Notes
2022	Live a Live	arranged "Unseen Syndrome" and "Captain of the Stars"
