= Devilman Crybaby =

2018 anime series by Masaaki Yuasa

- Key visual released in June 2017; its text reads "Kill, as instinct"
- Genre: Action; Dark fantasy; Superhero
- Created by: Go Nagai
- Original net animation
- Directed by: Masaaki Yuasa
- Produced by: Yōhei Shintaku; Kazuomi Nagai
- Written by: Ichirō Ōkouchi
- Music by: Kensuke Ushio
- Studio: Science Saru
- Licensed by: Netflix (streaming): UK/NA: Anime Limited (home media)
- Released: January 5, 2018
- Runtime: 24–27 minutes
- Episodes: 10
- icon

Devilman Crybaby is a 2018 Japanese original net animation (ONA) series based on Go Nagai's manga series Devilman. The web anime is directed by Masaaki Yuasa, produced by Aniplex and Dynamic Planning, animated by Science Saru, and released by Netflix. Yuasa was offered the opportunity to create a Devilman project by Aniplex, and envisioned Devilman Crybaby. Announced in 2017 to mark Nagai's 50th anniversary as a creator, Crybaby was made available for worldwide streaming on January 5, 2018, as a Netflix original series.

The series updates the original 1970s setting to the 21st century but retains the basic premise of Nagai's manga, following Akira Fudo and his friend Ryo Asuka as they face an ancient race of demons that seek to destroy humanity. Believing the only way to defeat the demons is to obtain their powers, Ryo proposes that Akira unite with a demon; in doing so Akira transforms into the titular Devilman, gaining the powers of a demon but retaining the soul of a human. The anti-war themes of the original Devilman are reinterpreted as a metaphor for bigotry, in which manipulation and paranoia are discussed using the allegory of the demons as "the other". The anime's themes of puberty, sexuality, sex, love, and LGBT identity were explored in critics' analysis of the work, along with a debate over whether the series' perspective and ending are nihilistic.

Fans were divided in their response to Yuasa's take on Nagai's work, though the series' announcement and release were among the most widely discussed anime series released in 2018. Its viewership numbers are unknown as Netflix does not disclose these figures, though many journalists described the series as a hit. Critics assessed Crybaby favorably, with some calling it a "masterpiece", the best Netflix anime, and one of the best anime of the year overall and the decade. Although the response to its graphic content and ending was divided, its animation, soundtrack, characterization and faithfulness to the original manga were praised.

== Plot ==
High school student Akira Fudo lives with his only friend and longtime crush, Miki Makimura, her brother Taro, and her parents, Noel and Akiko. When Akira attempts to defend Miki from a gang led by rapper Wamu, he is rescued by his childhood friend Ryo Asuka. Ryo tells Akira that his recent expedition to the Amazon rainforest revealed the existence of demons, and claims he will acknowledge their origin, but that the world's governments are suppressing this information.

Planning to expose the demons, Ryo takes Akira to the Sabbath Party at an underground nightclub; he attacks its patrons with a broken bottle, causing demons to appear. Ryo films the demons massacring the humans but is attacked and pinned by a demon. Akira's will overpowers Amon, a powerful demon who tries to possess him, transforming him into Amon's demon form and allowing him to slaughter the demons. After fighting out of the Sabbath, Akira and Ryo fight several demons, including the sadistic Jinmen, who is responsible for the deaths of Akira's parents, Amon's lover Sirene, and her associate Kaim. At some point, Ryo eventually reveals on television that track star Moyuru Koda and fellow female athlete Miki "Miko" Kuroda are also demons, leading Akira to recruit them.

As the series progresses, Akira and Ryo's friendship becomes strained as Ryo takes increasingly extreme actions to protect Akira's secret. At the same time, the revelation of the existence of demons triggers a global panic, causing riots and paranoia that begin to escalate as humanity turns on itself. In contrast, the demons begin to grip the world's population and possess humans on a large scale, thereby spreading fear and distrust throughout society. Disgusted by Ryo's apathy toward the chaos he has caused, Akira, alongside Koda and Miko, begins trying to find other Devilmen and resolves to contact them to form a team dedicated to protecting humankind from the demons.

Seeking answers about his actions and motives, Ryo returns to the Amazon rainforest to learn more about himself and the true nature of his past. Before he can do so, however, he is confronted by his assistant, Psycho Jenny, who reveals herself to be a demon in disguise. Ryo then makes an emergency announcement during a worldwide broadcast on national television, revealing the existence of Devilmen and publicly exposing Akira's identity by showing footage of his transformation. This revelation causes the world to descend into chaos through mass violence and genocide; Miki's family falls victim to the police and is buried by Akira outside the city, while Miki and her friends take to social media to defend Akira, only to be violently murdered by a paranoid mob, who mistook them for demons. Devastated after witnessing the mob maniacally parading around with the dismembered bodies of his friends on pikes, the grief-stricken Akira incinerates the entire mob in retribution.

Betrayed, Akira soon confronts Ryo, who reveals his true self as the fallen angel Satan. Satan discovered the demons living on Earth after being cast out of Heaven. Though God destroyed their bodies and demons in response to their savagery and violence, their souls endured and continued to exist. Having reincarnated as Ryo, Satan explains that he intends to exterminate humanity to reclaim it for the demons, deeming their capabilities and simpler nature to be superior to the more complicated and weaker humans. He orchestrated Amon merging with Akira to become a Devilman, allowing him to survive in the world to come, and to thank him for being by his side when he was human. Akira refuses to join Satan's cause and gathers the other Devilmen to fight Satan's army, but is defeated.

With humanity, the demons, and the Devilmen obliterated, leaving the Earth a devastated ruin, Satan reminisces with Akira, unaware that Akira has already died. Realizing that he has killed the only person he ever loved, Satan becomes overwhelmed with grief. He tearfully cradles Akira's lifeless body as an army of angels descends upon the Earth to destroy and reform it into a new world, which now has two moons.

== Characters and voice cast ==
Characters	Japanese	English
Akira Fudo (不動 明)	Kōki Uchiyama	Griffin Burns
Ryo Asuka (飛鳥 了)	Ayumu Murase	Kyle McCarley
Miki Makimura (牧村 美樹)	Megumi Han	Cristina Vee
Miki "Miko" Kuroda (ミーコ/黒田ミキ)	Ami Koshimizu	Cherami Leigh
Moyuru Koda (幸田 燃寛)	Junya Hirano	Bryce Papenbrook
Sirene (シレーヌ, Shirēnu)	Atsuko Tanaka	Cindy Robinson
Kaim (カイム, Kaimu)	Rikiya Koyama	Joe Ochman
Jinmen (ジンメン)	Akio Hirose	Michael Sorich
Xenon (ゼノン, Zenon)	Avu-chan	Uncredited
Psycho Jenny (サイコジェニー, Saiko Jenī)	Yasuhiro Takato	Cindy Robinson
Koji Nagasaki (長崎 光司)	Kenjiro Tsuda	Doug Erholtz
Wamu (ワム)	Ken the 390	Johnny Yong Bosch
Gabi (ガビ)	Subaru Kimura	Ben Pronsky
Mayuta "Kukun" (ククン/マユタ)	Young Dais	Keith Silverstein
Babo (バボ)	Hannya	Uncredited
Hie (ヒエ)	Afra	Uncredited
Taro Makimura (牧村 太郎)	Eri Inagawa	Dorothy Elias-Fahn
Noel Makimura (牧村 ノエル)	Masato Obara	Christopher Corey Smith
Akiko Makimura (牧村 亜樹子)	Sayaka Kobayashi	Anne Yatco

== Production and release ==
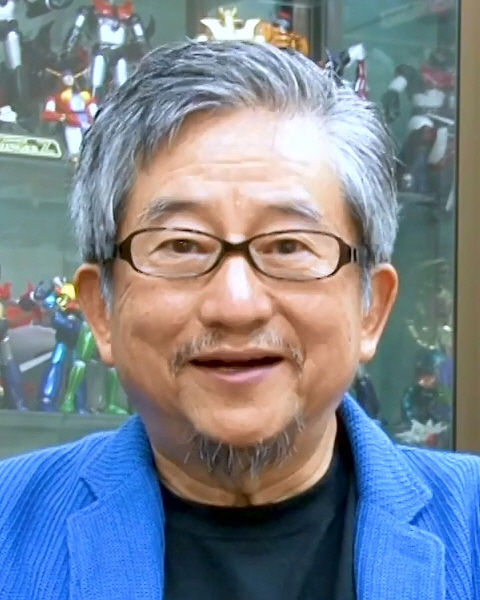
Devilman Crybaby is based on the manga by Go Nagai (pictured), but director Masaaki Yuasa worked on the anime considering that Nagai was probably restrained by the demographics of a shōnen magazine.

=== Development and staff ===
Devilman Crybaby is based on Go Nagai's manga Devilman. It was produced as a Netflix original series by Aniplex and Nagai's Dynamic Planning, and animated by Masaaki Yuasa's studio Science Saru. Yuasa directed the anime, Ichirō Ōkouchi wrote the script and Eunyoung Choi served as the animation producer. Ayumi Kurashima was the character designer, while Kiyotaka Oshiyama was responsible specifically for the demon's design. Although Yuasa was a fan of the original Devilman, it was a project he never imagined he would work on. It was Aniplex with whom he collaborated on Ping Pong the Animation (2014), that suggested a Devilman adaptation. Yuasa did Crybaby aware that Nagai was probably restrained in the depiction of its sexual and violent content by having Devilman published in a shōnen (young males) magazine. The director commented that Nagai's later works were "even more extreme" and so he created Crybaby with the mindset of "If Nagai-sensei could have done as he pleased, he'd have gone this far". Yuasa also expressed his desire in creating a sequel to Crybaby, saying that if he did, he could explore the "different settings and ways of telling the story".

=== Setting ===
Crybaby updates the 1970s scenario of Nagai's manga on which it is based to a 21st-century setting. While the manga featured delinquents who bullied Akira, the anime uses rappers as substitutes for them. Because of that, some episodes feature extended rap sequences performed by professional rappers. These rap performances function as a type of narrator throughout the series. The director said he made this change because he believes "rappers are the people who speak what's on their minds today". It features commentaries done through rapid text messages and social media to explore humans' reaction to demons. Yuasa commented that the technologies and social media's popularity made the 21st-century situation very close to the Devilman manga's violent scenario, as "people are a lot more connected, for good and bad". On the bad side, he cited people getting shot over a video game, police brutality towards African-Americans, the rise of nationalism in politics, and problems being blamed on foreigners. On the good side, he mentioned people coming out as LGBT through social media and a greater "acceptance of different opinions and lifestyles". The series takes place in a universe in which the 1970s Devilman TV series exists, its theme song appears as a child's ringtone, and the bedroom of one of the children is filled with Devilman anime objects.

=== Release and merchandise ===
The series was first announced in March 2017 to celebrate Nagai's 50th anniversary as a creator. In August, its first trailer was released on Netflix Japan's YouTube channel and it was revealed that the anime would have ten episodes. All episodes were released exclusively on Netflix on January 5, 2018, in 90 countries or territories. The series was made available in 23 subtitled languages and seven spoken languages; the dubbed languages include English, French, German, Italian, Brazilian Portuguese, standard Spanish, and Castilian Spanish. On May 30, 2018, Aniplex Japan released the complete series on Blu-ray Disc as part of a "complete box". An exhibit of the series called Sabbath Shibuya was held at Japanese music store chain Tower Records between May and June 2018. Japanese clothing brand Beams produced Devilman Crybaby-inspired street fashion, while Aniplex released polystone statues based on the anime.

=== Music ===
Devilman Crybaby Original Soundtrack (Note: the album name is stylised as DEVILMAN crybaby Original Soundtrack)

Soundtrack album by Kensuke Ushio
- Released: January 10, 2018
- Studios: Aobadai (Meguro, Tokyo); HeartBeat Recording (Setagaya, Tokyo); Takashi's (Tokyo); kimken (Nasu, Tochigi Prefecture)
- Length: 94:57
- Languages: Japanese, English
- Label: Aniplex
- Director: Yukiko Matsunaga
- Producer: Yōhei Shintaku

Kensuke Ushio chronology
A Shape of Light (2016)	Devilman Crybaby Original Soundtrack (Note: the album name is stylised as DEVILMAN crybaby Original Soundtrack) (2018)	movie Liz and the Blue Bird Original Soundtrack: girls, dance, staircase (2018)

The anime features "Man Human" by Denki Groove as its opening theme, while Takkyū to Tabibito performs a special ending theme song "Konya Dake" (今夜だけ; lit. 'Tonight Only') only for episode nine. Crybaby also features a remix of the theme song for the 1970s anime, "Devilman no Uta", in a version performed by Queen Bee's Avu-chan as an insert song. The rapper Ken the 390, who also dubbed the character Wamu in the Japanese version, was the supervisor of the rap sequences in the series.

The music for the series was composed by Kensuke Ushio. Its two-disc, 48-track original soundtrack was released on January 10, 2018, by Aniplex. The complete box also included a Devilman Crybaby Freestyle Rap All Tracks CD.

All tracks composed/produced by Kensuke Ushio, except where noted.

Disc 1
No.	Title	Lyrics	Music	Vocals	Length
1.	"The Genesis"				1:46
2.	"D.V.M.N." (-Theme from "DEVILMAN crybaby"-)				3:34
3.	"Buddy, Ryo"				3:30
4.	"Devilman no Uta"	Yū Aku	Gō Misawa	Avu-chan from Queen Bee	3:05
5.	"Strategist"				2:34
6.	"Akira the Wild"				1:55
7.	"Night Ride"				1:26
8.	"Miki"				1:52
9.	"Miki the Witch"				2:41
10.	"Wired"				1:12
11.	"School Life"				1:57
12.	"Wishy Washy"				2:02
13.	"News Anchor"				1:10
14.	"They Said…"				1:51
15.	"Cheesy Drop"				1:39
16.	"Panic"				1:26
17.	"Possession"				1:27
18.	"Dreadful Stories"				2:01
19.	"Who Is She?"				1:50
20.	"Death Mask"				1:27
21.	"Behind the Scene"				1:59
22.	"Anxiety"				1:10
Total length:					43:34

Disc 2
No.	Title	Length
1.	"Judgement"	1:45
2.	"Sabbath Ⅰ"	4:48
3.	"60311"	1:44
4.	"The Crawling"	1:51
5.	"Nightmare"	1:38
6.	"His Heart"	1:32
7.	"Tears"	1:47
8.	"Sincerity"	1:01
9.	"Luxuria"	1:50
10.	"The Two of Them"	1:42
11.	"Night Hawk"	2:33
12.	"Beautiful Silene"	1:42
13.	"Smells Blood"	1:49
14.	"Crisis"	1:20
15.	"Black Mist"	1:33
16.	"The Cult"	1:38
17.	"Enigma"	1:31
18.	"Flashback"	1:09
19.	"Prayer"	1:58
20.	"Her Baton"	2:08
21.	"Veritas"	1:42
22.	"Ryo"	1:36
23.	"Satan"	1:57
24.	"Pathetique"	3:05
25.	"From Here to Eternity"	1:55
26.	"Crybaby"	4:09
Total length:		94:57

== Themes and analysis ==
Devilman Crybaby is based on Devilman, whose main objective, according to Nagai, was to be an anti-war story. As such, Crybaby is a depiction of how humans can be as violent and cruel as the so-called demons. Heather Alexandra of Kotaku wrote that demons are the ones doing violent actions at the start, but that humans replicate their behavior as the story progresses. Many critics said the persecution of devilmen was a metaphor for bigotry; for example, Megan Farokhmanesh of The Verge commented the series is an allegory "about the cost of persecuting those we don't understand" and attacking people perceived as different. Alexandra stated the panic people create about demons is analogous to the actions of homophobia, transphobia, racism, or other moments people "see [other] people as the 'other'". Mike Toole of Anime News Network commented the anime depicts how fast people will be able to other "suspicious or abnormal" people in order to protect their own groups. The Decider's Eric Thurm said the mass violence reflects the anti-war narrative and that the series' "political message" is a reflection on "humanity's tendency toward paranoia and willingness to turn on others".

Brittany Vincent wrote for Syfy.com that the series leads to an "inevitable existential crisis", while Bloody Disgusting's Michael Pementel highlighted its "existential and emotional elements". Alexandra said the series endeavors to reflect on many philosophical questions, including on goodness, on debauchery, and on being human. GameSpot's Kallie Plagge described it as a meditation on the meaning of being human, while Lynzee Loveridge of Anime News Network wrote it questions whether or not there is a line that separates humanity from monstrosity. Rob Salkowitz of Forbes wrote it also explores religion and the fragility of social institutions. Pementel also discussed the role of manipulation on starting the frenzy of violence among the population. Toole commented that Crybaby discusses the proliferation of urban legends and the difficulty people have to deal with "societal upheaval". Anime News Network's Rose Bridges highlighted the role of mass media and technology in the anime as they should supposedly unite but instead facilitate "judgmental impulses". She also commented it reflected on how this judgment may devastate people internally, which is symbolized by the demons' emergence from the inside of people's bodies.

Devilman Crybaby was also interpreted as an allegory for puberty, especially male adolescence. Toole commented that the physical and mental changes Akira goes through after obtaining Devilman's powers represent metaphorically the anxiety during puberty. Vincent stated it was a story about "self-discovery, and coming to terms with yourself", while Allegra Frank of Polygon said the series shows "a real love for young people". Nick Creamer of Anime News Network called it a tale "about the chaos of puberty, about struggles with sexual identity and unrequited love". James Beckett, also commented for Anime News Network, that it reflects on how young people deal with sex, love, and self-identity, and how it affects their "sense of worth". Anime News Network's Jacob Chapman said it features stories of people "learning to accept themselves and love each other". Bridges commented it has a positive message to LGBT watchers, as it depicts "the destructive nature of the closet", while also showing that self-acceptance can strengthen people who are suffering. The Japan Times writer Matt Schley stated that despite being an adaptation of Nagai's Devilman, it felt more like a spiritual successor to Kemonozume, since both handle the subjects of identity, prejudice, religion and star-crossed love.

Think of the story as a relay race where tears are passed as a baton. Akira/Devilman is a crybaby, and at the end he is able to make Satan cry

— Masaaki Yuasa, director

Crybaby featured the original apocalyptic ending of the manga, not featured in any other Devilman animated adaptations. Daryl Surat of Otaku USA called it nihilistic, while Remus Noronha of Collider commented that "a sense of tragic inevitability" is presented through the whole series. Alexandra said the anime shows the manga's nihilism although it seems to exhibit a lot of hope near the end. Kotaku's Chris Person wrote that, despite ending in a tragedy, he does not think it is appropriate to characterize Devilman Crybaby as nihilistic "because it has an emotional core and a thesis that it strongly believes in". Frank commented the devastated Satan's tears for Akira "makes such a nihilistic ending feel not so totally hopeless". Yuasa himself commented on this subject, saying Crybaby focused on Ryo's character. While Akira is resolute about his actions from beginning to end, Ryo faces doubts, "internal changes and struggles at least". They meet as a child and Akira is the only one who supports Ryo, who develops feelings for him but does not realize it. Akira's role is to teach Ryo something and the story's essential point "is about what Ryo learns in the end"; and "in the end, it's about love".

== Episodes ==
All episodes were written by Ichirō Ōkouchi.

No.	Title	Storyboarded by	Directed by	Animation directed by
1	"I Need You" (Japanese: おまえが必要なんだ)	Masaaki Yuasa	Masaaki Yuasa	Tomohisa Shimoyama
2	"One Hand Is Enough"; Transliteration: "Kata te de jūbun da" (Japanese: 片手で十分だ)	Masaaki Yuasa	Katsunori Shibata	Takashi Kojima
3	"Believe Me!"; Transliteration: "Ore wa tottanda!" (Japanese: オレは撮ったんだ！)	Juan Manuel Laguna; Abel Góngora	Tōru Yoshida	Tetsuro Uetake
4	"Come, Akira"; Transliteration: "Akira, kite" (Japanese: 明、来て)	Tomohisa Shimoyama	Tomohisa Shimoyama	Tomohisa Shimoyama
5	"Beautiful Silene"; Transliteration: "Shirēnu, kimi wa utsukushī" (Japanese: シレーヌ、君は美しい)	Kiyotaka Oshiyama	Kiyotaka Oshiyama	Kiyotaka Oshiyama
6	"Neither Demon nor Human"; Transliteration: "Akuma demo ningen demonai" (Japanese: 悪魔でも人間でもない)	Keisuke Shinohara	Keisuke Shinohara	Naoya Wada
7	"Weak Humans, Wise Demons"; Transliteration: "Ningen wa yowaku, akuma wa kashikoi" (Japanese: 人間は弱く、悪魔は賢い)	Pyeon-Gang Ho	Ayataka Tanemura	Ken Obata, Atsuko Hikimoto, Yūko Kobayashi, Masumi Hattori, Kenji Hattori, Daisuke Takemoto, Kazuhiro Sasaki, Atsushi Aono
8	"I Must Know Myself"; Transliteration: "Ore wa ore o shiranakute wa naranai" (Japanese: オレはオレを知らなくてはならない)	Katsunori Shibata	Katsunori Shibata	Tomomi Kawatsuma, Shōko Nishigaki, Kiyotaka Oshiyama
9	"Go to Hell, You Mortals"; Transliteration: "Jigoku e ochiro, ningen-domo" (Japanese: 地獄へ墜ちろ、人間ども)	Masaaki Yuasa	Takashi Kojima	Takashi Kojima
10	"Crybaby"; Transliteration: "Nakimushi" (Japanese: 泣き虫)	Masaaki Yuasa	Masaaki Yuasa	Naoya Wada

== Reception ==
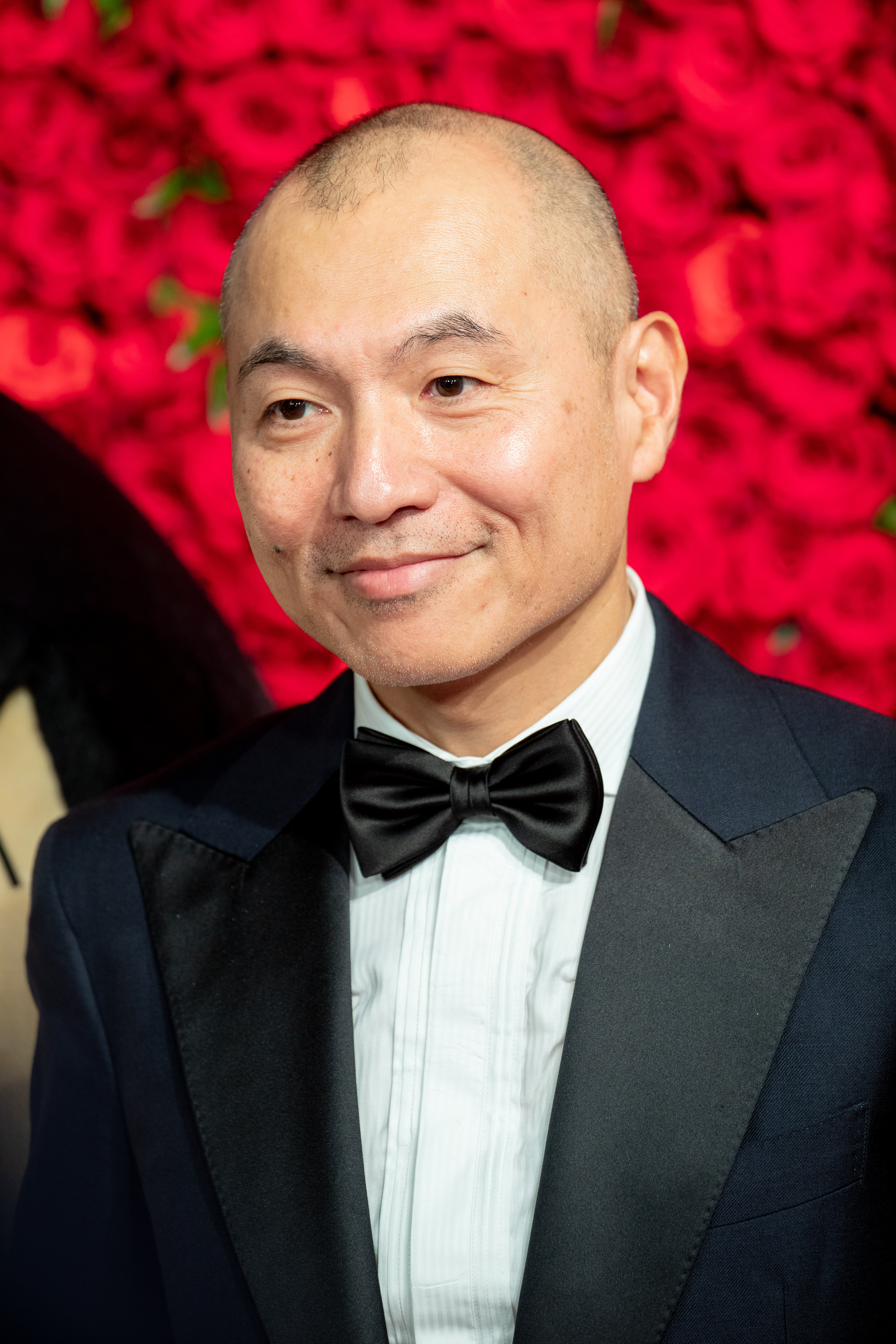
Although fans were divided in their response to Yuasa's (pictured) take on Nagai's work, many critics praised the animation style Yuasa used in Devilman Crybaby.

=== Audience response ===
Devilman Crybaby's announcement created anticipation among anime fans. It was the Netflix original anime that attracted the "biggest buzz", according to James Hadfield of The Japan Times. It turned out to be "the first big talking point of the year in the anime community", according to Syfy.com's Christopher Inoa. It was described as "one of 2018's most talked-about anime" by The Japan Times' Roland Kelts, and "one of the most talked-about anime releases for many years" by Dan Auty of GameSpot. The Devilmen running-style attracted some attention among anime fans, including YouTuber PewDiePie, and was dubbed "the best animated running since Naruto". The series' remix of "Devilman no Uta" also became a popular meme. Nevertheless, it was "one of the most divisive anime of the Winter 2018 season", according to Nick Valdez of ComicBook.com, because of Yuasa's "stylized take" on Nagai's original work. The anime was a regular topic on Twitter in January 2018; ComicBook.com's Megan Peters reported on it, declaring "to say it has been controversial is an understatement". Peters commented the main source of disagreement was about its "over-the-top imagery" that "enthralled" some and "revolted" others.

Although Netflix does not disclose viewership numbers, Auty, Valdez, Kelts, and Forbes' Lauren Orsini have described the series as a "hit". Its viewership consisted most of non-Japanese audience; 90% of it were from outside Japan. Nevertheless, Japanese Blu-ray release was the 11th best-selling product on its medium and in its release week sold at least 2,637 copies. Inoa wrote that the "immediate reaction" to it indicated it was probably Yuasa's most popular work. Writing for Otaku USA, Vincent commented it is one of Yuasa's "most instantly recognizable works". Because of Devilman Crybaby's popularity, GKIDS showed interest in releasing Science Saru's previous works The Night Is Short, Walk On Girl and Lu over the Wall. Likewise, Sam Reach of Anime News Network commented, "Go Nagai fever is running red-hot nowadays, thanks in no small part to Devilman Crybaby". Nagai himself, the 1970s Devilman anime screenwriter Masaki Tsuji, and filmmaker Sion Sono praised Crybaby.

=== Critical reception ===
Based on nine reviews collected by review aggregator Rotten Tomatoes, Devilman Crybaby has received mostly positive critical reviews, with an overall approval rating of 89% from 9 critics and an average score of 6 out of 10. The anime has been considered one of the best anime available on Netflix, (Note: The anime was considered one of the best on Netflix in unranked lists by Collider, Den of Geek, Geek.com, IGN, GameSpot, Polygon, Vulture, and Wired. On ranked lists, Esquire's Philippines edition ranked it the 9th best; Paste ranked it the 8th best; and GamesRadar+ ranked it the second best.) as well as one of the best or the best anime of 2018, (Note: It was among the six best anime of 2018, according to IGN's Miranda Sanchez in September, and it was ultimately elected the best one by IGN staff. Kotaku's Cecilia D'Anastasio and Lauren Orsini of Forbes included it among the five best of the year. Crunchyroll's Nate Ming, Polygon's Palmer Haasch, Julia Lee and Austen Goslin, and The Verge's Michael Moore included the anime among the best of year on unranked lists. Anime News Network's Zac Bertschy, Rose Bridges, Jacob Chapman, Lynzee Loveridge, and Lauren Orsini chose Devilman Crybaby to be the best anime in 2018; James Beckett and Chris Farris placed it second, while Mike Toole ranked it fourth.) while it was awarded "Anime of the Year" at the 3rd Crunchyroll Anime Awards, along with Yuasa being awarded Best Director. The anime was among the 14 Japanese works listed in the Jury Selections in the Animation Division of the 22nd Japan Media Arts Festival Awards by Japanese government's Agency for Cultural Affairs. Crybaby was also chosen among the best anime of the 2010s by the staffs of Crunchyroll, IGN and Polygon, while Film School Rejects selected it as one of the best animated series of the decade. Paste magazine's staff elected it the 35th best anime of all time, with critic Toussaint Egan writing the anime is "not only as one of the best series in recent memory, but one that will stand the test of time". Frank of Polygon, Vincent, Cecilia D'Anastasio of Kotaku, and Beckett of Anime News Network called the series a "masterpiece". Peters wrote it exhibits all the a attributes of "an artistic cult classic", while Bridges of Anime News Network deemed it "just top-to-bottom perfect".

The series has been noted for its graphic violence and sexual content; the latter has been compared to pornography. Steven Pearce of The Encyclopedia of Science Fiction described the show's violence as involving substantial body horror and noted that some of the sexual content veered into fan service. Its gore content has been highlighted, and because of its "ultra-violence" it has usually been described as "not for the faint of heart" or "weak of heart". Auty of GameSpot stated it "has pushed back the boundaries" of what type of content can be shown in a streaming service, and wrote an entire article dedicated to why the series has "some of the most extreme content ever to hit Netflix". Toole stated it is "the most ludicrously violent, sexed-up anime TV series ever aired", while Joyce Slaton wrote for Common Sense Media that its mature content exceed what is expected to be featured in adult-aimed anime. Emily Gaudette of Newsweek called it "the bloodiest, most profane animated series of the year", and Thurm of Decider described it as the "grossest show on TV". The Japan Times's Schley commented that Crybaby differs from other Devilman adaptations because of its "level of on-screen sex and violence" and that it was more suitable for the public of the 1980s with its "ultra-violent films" like Akira, Demon City Shinjuku or Violence Jack. On the other hand, Chapman of Anime News Network felt it was not difficult to bear the violence because of "Yuasa's super-cartoony style".

While Peters of ComicBook.com and Rebecca Silverman of Anime News Network said most of the content was "gratuitous", Farokhmanesh of The Verge disagreed, saying it is "a tool used to demonstrate the overindulgent, sometimes disgusting nature of being human". Likewise, Sanchez of IGN deemed it to be "one of the rare graphic action anime that has an incredible story to back up". Peters said it "is as harrowing as it is thought-provoking", while Pementel of Bloody Disgusting commented "its violence cuts on an intimate level" because of the themes it evokes. Beckett concluded the series features a "poetical vision" and that its focus on personal experiences makes it intimate, despite the violence. Alexandra of Kotaku was divided on the topic; while understanding the story's focus on humans' vileness and indulgency, she described it as "occasionally distracting" and said the amount of violence makes it lose its impact fast. Kotaku's Person commented that the sexual depictions were "deeply silly" and fit the plot, since the first part is about sex's ludicrosity and absurdity, especially to young people. However, Alexandra also highlighted how the camera frames several woman "in the most lustful way possible", while Loveridge of Anime News Network stated it demonizes female sexuality as all demons in the Sabbath are female and their demon traits are based on their sex organs which then devour the men.

Many critics commented about "the remarkable animation style", as reported Pementel. Pearce characterized the animation of the demons as having an "enthralling bad-trip psychedelic style". It was considered one of the most "visually striking" anime of all time by Loveridge, while it has been described as "visually enthralling" by Thurm, and "visually stunning" by Matt Kamen for GamesRadar+ and by Frank. Theron Martin of Anime News Network commented, "you won't see a more [...] outlandish visual spectacle in anime this season". Loveridge called it a "visual trip unlike any other", while Salkowitz of Forbes stated that the series "breaks out the most eye-melting psychedelia seen on the small screen" since MTV's Liquid Television. Writing for Otaku USA, Vincent said, "Yuasa's signature fluid animation [...] transform[s] what could have ultimately been an unattractive gorefest into an attractive ballet of human and demonic interaction". Daniel Kurland of Den of Geek said that "there's nothing too special about Devilman at its surface level", but that Yuasa's injection of his "eye-popping animation and art direction" turns the story into "something special".

Another aspect of Devilman Crybaby that was commended includes its "pumping" and "pulsing" soundtrack, which Inoa qualified as "so good it is an outright tragedy that it isn't available on Spotify". Musically, the rap sequences were praised both by fans and specialized media like Hypebeast. Others, including Creamer of Anime News Network, praised the "rich characterization". Surat of Otaku USA commented, "The key is characterization", which he praised for not being limited to just Akira and Ryo. Toole enjoyed how Miki was no more a mere plot device that she was in the manga and the punks' reconceptualization as rappers. The way it dealt with sexuality and its openly LGBT characters also received praise; Surat said "many strongly resonate with Crybaby for its emphasis on explicitly gay and lesbian characters in a dramatic presentation". Person liked the fact that there were "empathetic depictions" from both genders of the difficulty of being oneself and its "explicit and metaphorical queer presence". Farokhmanesh also found "its unwavering acceptance of storylines like queer romance" to be "refreshing" and praised its subversion of toxic masculinity. Pearce interpreted the series as a reflection on masculinity and empathy, particularly the tendency to persecute minorities during times of social stress and the power of mob mentality over most people. He also saw the finale as shifting the focus from Akira to Ryo, a tragic figure who comes to realize his love for his friend. The ending was divisive; PewDiePie considered it "flat" and a "fatal flaw" in the series, while Frank deemed its "beautiful, devastating finale" to be "perfection".

Crybaby has generally been considered to be faithful to the original manga, maintaining its sexual and violent content. Surat declared it to be "perhaps the most faithful animated adaptation of it". Egan of Paste stated it "is as orgiastically violent and unflinchingly risqué as Nagai's original manga". Toole said that at first Devilman Crybaby appears to be "a straight take on Nagai's classic story", and also compared the first episodes to the 1987 original video animation of Devilman. Vincent considered it to be "the best iteration of Devilman to have ever existed" because of Yuasa's animation. Zac Bertschy of Anime News Network concluded that "it elevates the material into something else entirely, a spectacularly gay firestorm, a screaming, crying apocalypse that takes hold of you the moment it starts and never lets go". Pearce, while acknowledging some flaws, regarded the series as "disturbing and impressive" and noted that its story had been heavily revised to make it more contemporary.
