= Ayumi Kurashima =

Japanese freelance animator (born 1977)

Ayumi Kurashima (倉島亜由美, Kurashima Ayumi; born 1977 in Tokyo) is a Japanese freelance animator. She was originally part of Daizō Production.

She has worked as a key animator, animation director and character designer on several works. She has recently worked on numerous Bones works.

== Works ==
=== Anime television ===
- Chūka Ichiban! (1997–1998; in-between animation)
- Hunter × Hunter (1999–2001; key animation, episode 14)
- Beyblade (2001; key animation, episode 18)
- Baki the Grappler (2001; key animation, 2001)
- Angelic Layer (2001; key animation, episodes 2, 13, 17, 19, 23, 25)
- RahXephon (2002; assistant animation director, episodes 12, 21, 23, 24, 25, 26; key animation, episode 21; original animation, episodes 5, 8, 10, 12, 17, 19, 23, 24, 25; finishing animation, episodes 1, 3, 4, 5, 6, 7, 8, 11, 12, 14, 20, 23, 26; in-between animation, episodes 1, 12)
- Hajime no Ippo (2000–2002; key animation, episode 68)
- Overman King Gainer (2002–2003; key animation, episode 14)
- Shin Megami Tensei: D-Children Light & Dark (2002–2003; key animation, episode 37)
- Mahōtsukai ni Taisetsu no Koto (2003; key animation, episode 2)
- Wolf's Rain (2003; animation director, episode 20; key animation, episodes 4, 10; finishing animation, episodes 12, 21)
- Scrapped Princess (2003; animation director, episodes 16, 20; key animation, episodes 16, 20, 24, OP)
- Fullmetal Alchemist (2003–2004; key animation, episodes 7, 13)
- Kenran Butōsai: The Mars Daybreak (2004; animation director, episodes 1, 5, 13, 18, 24; animation assistance, episode 25; key animation, episodes 9, 13, 24, 26, OP)
- Kurau Phantom Memory (2004; key animation, episode 15)
- Eureka Seven (2005–2006; animation director, episodes 2, 9, 18, 26, 33, 35, 42, 48, 50; key animation, episodes 1, 9, 14, 26, 35, 48, 50, OP 4)
- Ouran High School Host Club (2006; animation director, key animation, clothing design, episode 13; key animation, episode 19)
- Tenpō Ibun Ayakashi Ayashi (2006–2007; key animation, episodes 1, 3, 7, 12, 18, 21, 24, OP 2)
- Bounen no Xamdou (2008–2009; character design and animation director, OP, ED, episodes 1, 2, 4, 9, 12, 24; key animation, OP)
- DEVILMAN crybaby (2018); character design

=== Animated films ===
- Pia Carrot e Yōkoso!! -Sayaka no Koi Monogatari- (2002; animation director)
- RahXephon: Tagen Hensyōkyoku (2003; animation director, key animation)
