= Yukinobu Tatsu =

Japanese manga artist

- 龍幸伸
- Born: 1990 (age 35–36); Saitama Prefecture, Japan
- Occupation: Manga artist
- Years active: 2010–2014; 2019–present
- Notable work: Dandadan

Yukinobu Tatsu (龍幸伸) is a Japanese manga artist. He is best known as the creator of the hit manga series Dandadan and also for his stint as an assistant to Tatsuki Fujimoto and Yuji Kaku during the serializations of Fire Punch, Chainsaw Man, and Hell's Paradise: Jigokuraku.

== Early life ==
Tatsu was born in Saitama Prefecture, Japan, around 1990. While he never intended on becoming a manga artist, he had always been good at drawing since from a young age, and had won awards for his work, despite never attending any art school or cram school. He always loved reading manga but mostly played baseball, and only drew pictures like doodles.

In junior high school, he found himself captivated by the action/battle genre(s) of manga, such as Kentaro Miura's Berserk, Ryōji Minagawa's Project ARMS and Spriggan, along with Katsuhiro Otomo's Akira and Kentaro Yabuki's To Love Ru, whose characters he resonated with. His admiration for these authors stems from their art and ability to convey emotion through their work.

== Works ==
- Seigi no Rokugō (正義の禄号), serialized in Monthly Shōnen Magazine (2010–2011)
- Fire Ball!, serialized in Monthly Shōnen Magazine (2013–2014)
- Renai Saibaihō (恋愛栽培法), one-shot published in Jump SQ.Crown Summer 2015
- Kami-sama no Iru Machi (神様のいる街), one-shot published in Jump SQ.Crown Autumn 2015
- Yamada Kiki Ippatsu (山田キキ一発), one-shot published on Shōnen Jump+ (2019)
- Dandadan (ダンダダン), serialized on Shōnen Jump+ (2021–present)
