= Fūga Yamashiro =

Japanese anime director

Fūga Yamashiro (山代 風我) (born July 15, 1993) is a Japanese Anime director. He currently works with the Science Saru animation studio.

== Filmography ==
=== Director ===
- Don't mess with the IDE! (2020)
- The Tale of the Heike (2022)
- Dandadan (2024–present)
