= 9th Crunchyroll Anime Awards =

2025 award ceremony

- Awarded for: Excellence in anime
- Date: May 25, 2025
- Location: Grand Prince Hotel New Takanawa, Tokyo, Japan
- Country: United States
- Hosted by: Sally Amaki; Jon Kabira

Highlights
- Most wins: Solo Leveling (9)
- Most nominations: Dandadan (22)
- Anime of the Year: Solo Leveling
- Film of the Year: Look Back
- Website: Crunchyroll Anime Awards

The 9th Crunchyroll Anime Awards was held on May 25, 2025, at the Grand Prince Hotel Takanawa in Tokyo, Japan. This edition featured 32 categories honoring anime released from September 2023 to December 2024. The ceremony was streamed live by Crunchyroll on YouTube and Twitch. Sally Amaki and Jon Kabira hosted the ceremony for the third time, including its previous edition. Crunchyroll reported that 51 million votes from around the world were submitted, with the majority of them coming from Brazil, Canada, Chile, France, Germany, India, Mexico, Spain, the United Kingdom, and the United States (both Canada and Chile are first time additions into the top 10).

A-1 Pictures' Solo Leveling won nine awards including Anime of the Year, becoming the first adaptation of a manhwa to win the award. Meanwhile, Frieren: Beyond Journey's End by Madhouse won four including Best Director. Studio Durian's Look Back, an adaptation of Tatsuki Fujimoto's manga of the same name, won Film of the Year. Other winners include Dandadan by Science SARU which received the most nominations in this edition with 22, as well as Attack on Titan, Demon Slayer: Kimetsu no Yaiba, Spy × Family, Jujutsu Kaisen, One Piece, Kaiju No. 8, The Apothecary Diaries, Ninja Kamui, Makeine: Too Many Losing Heroines!, Re:Zero − Starting Life in Another World, Blue Box, and Mashle: Magic and Muscles.

== Winners and nominees ==
Categories for the 9th edition were revealed on December 6, 2024. Nominees were announced on April 3, 2025, in a livestream at Crunchyroll's YouTube channel. Dandadan received the most nominations with 22, followed by Frieren: Beyond Journey's End at 20, and Kaiju No. 8 and Delicious in Dungeon at 16. The four anime series were nominated for Anime of the Year, together with Solo Leveling and The Apothecary Diaries. All Anime of the Year nominees, except The Apothecary Diaries, were also nominated on the Best Animation category, together with Demon Slayer: Kimetsu no Yaiba; however, all Anime of the Year nominees were the new series. One Piece was nominated in the Best Continuing Series category for the third consecutive year, along with Demon Slayer: Kimetsu no Yaiba. My Hero Academia which was also nominated in the aforementioned category, received the second Film of the Year nomination with the You're Next film, after Two Heroes which won previously in the third edition. Keiichirō Saitō was nominated again in Best Director for his work on Frieren: Beyond Journey's End, along with Haruo Sotozaki for Demon Slayer: Kimetsu no Yaiba. Akira Matsushima received a nomination in Best Character Design for the third consecutive year for his work on Demon Slayer: Kimetsu no Yaiba. Kensuke Ushio was nominated again for Best Score for his work on Dandadan, along with Yuki Kajiura and Go Shiina for Demon Slayer: Kimetsu no Yaiba. Atsumi Tanezaki was nominated in the Best VA Performance (Japanese) category for the third consecutive year as Frieren.

Among genre categories, Spy × Family was nominated in Best Comedy for the third consecutive year, and Demon Slayer: Kimetsu no Yaiba for Best Action. Mushoku Tensei: Jobless Reincarnation was nominated for Best Isekai Anime, along with KonoSuba: God's Blessing on This Wonderful World!, Re:Zero − Starting Life in Another World, and That Time I Got Reincarnated as a Slime. Oshi no Ko was nominated again for Best Drama. For character categories, Frieren and Ken "Okarun" Takakura were nominated for Best Main Character and "Must Protect at All Costs" Character. Two characters from both Dandadan (Seiko Ayase and Turbo Granny) and Frieren: Beyond Journey's End (Fern and Himmel), were nominated for Best Supporting Character, while Anya Forger of Spy × Family was nominated in the "Must Protect at All Costs" Character category for the third consecutive year. Five anime songs nominated for Best Anime Song were nominated for Best Opening Sequence as well: "Abyss" by Yungblud, "Bling-Bang-Bang-Born" and "Otonoke" by Creepy Nuts, "Fatal" by Gemn, and "Level" by SawanoHiroyuki[nZk]: Tomorrow X Together.

=== Awards ===
Solo Leveling won nine awards including Anime of the Year, the first for a manhwa adaptation. The win was described as a massive upset by news outlets, as Frieren: Beyond Journey's End was widely expected to win the top prize; it nevertheless won four awards including the inaugural Best Background Art and its director Keiichirō Saitō winning Best Director. Look Back won Film of the Year, with its director Kiyotaka Oshiyama receiving the award. Dandadan won three awards including Best Character Design, while Demon Slayer: Kimetsu no Yaiba won Best Continuing Series and Best Animation. Ninja Kamui won Best Original Anime. Solo Leveling, Blue Box, Mashle: Magic and Muscles, Makeine: Too Many Losing Heroines!, Frieren: Beyond Journey's End, and Re:Zero − Starting Life in Another World won the genre awards for Best Action, Best Romance, Best Comedy, Best Slice of Life, Best Drama, and the inaugural Best Isekai Anime respectively. Sung Jin-woo of Solo Leveling won Best Main Character, while Fern of Frieren: Beyond Journey's End won Best Supporting Character. Anya Forger won the "Must Protect at All Costs" Character award for the third consecutive year. "Otonoke" by Creepy Nuts won Best Anime Song and Best Opening Sequence, while "Request" by Krage won Best Ending Sequence. Hiroyuki Sawano won Best Score for his work on Solo Leveling. Aoi Yūki won Best Voice Acting (Japanese) for her work as Maomao in The Apothecary Diaries, while Aleks Le won Best Voice Acting (English) for his work as Sung Jin-woo in Solo Leveling. Attack on Titan became the first recipient to receive the Global Impact Award, which was awarded to honor the works and visionary creatives who have produced anime series changing popular culture. Yuichiro Hayashi, The Final Season's director, accepted the award.

Winners are listed first, highlighted in boldface, and indicated with a double dagger (‡). The lists are arranged alphabetically, except for the winner.

**Anime of the Year**: **Solo Leveling — A-1 Pictures**‡; Dandadan — Science SARU; Delicious in Dungeon — Studio Trigger; Frieren: Beyond Journey's End — Madhouse; Kaiju No. 8 — Production I.G; The Apothecary Diaries — Toho Animation Studio and OLM	**Film of the Year**: **Look Back — Studio Durian**‡; Haikyu!! The Dumpster Battle — Production I.G; Mononoke the Movie: Phantom in the Rain — EOTA; My Hero Academia: You're Next — Bones; Spy × Family Code: White — Wit Studio and CloverWorks; The Colors Within — Science SARU
**Best Continuing Series**: **Demon Slayer: Kimetsu no Yaiba Hashira Training Arc — Ufotable**‡; Bleach: Thousand-Year Blood War – The Conflict — Pierrot Films; My Hero Academia (season 7) — Bones; One Piece — Toei Animation; Oshi no Ko (season 2) — Doga Kobo; Spy × Family (season 2) — Wit Studio and CloverWorks	**Best New Series**: **Solo Leveling — A-1 Pictures**‡; Dandadan — Science SARU; Delicious in Dungeon — Studio Trigger; Frieren: Beyond Journey's End — Madhouse; Kaiju No. 8 — Production I.G; The Apothecary Diaries — Toho Animation Studio and OLM
**Best Original Anime**: **Ninja Kamui — E&H Production**‡; Bucchigiri?! — MAPPA; Girls Band Cry — Toei Animation; Jellyfish Can't Swim in the Night — Doga Kobo; Metallic Rouge — Bones; Train to the End of the World — EMT Squared	**Best Animation**: **Demon Slayer: Kimetsu no Yaiba Hashira Training Arc — Ufotable**‡; Dandadan — Science SARU; Delicious in Dungeon — Studio Trigger; Frieren: Beyond Journey's End — Madhouse; Kaiju No. 8 — Production I.G; Solo Leveling — A-1 Pictures
**Best Character Design**: **Naoyuki Onda, original designs by Yukinobu Tatsu — Dandadan**‡; Akira Matsushima, original designs by Koyoharu Gotouge — Demon Slayer: Kimetsu no Yaiba Hashira Training Arc; Naoki Takeda, original designs by Ryoko Kui — Delicious in Dungeon; Reiko Nagasawa, original designs by Tsukasa Abe — Frieren: Beyond Journey's End; Tetsuya Nishio, original designs by Naoya Matsumoto — Kaiju No. 8; Yukiko Nakatani, original designs by Touko Shino — The Apothecary Diaries	**Best Director**: **Keiichirō Saitō — Frieren: Beyond Journey's End**‡; Fūga Yamashiro — Dandadan; Haruo Sotozaki — Demon Slayer: Kimetsu no Yaiba Hashira Training Arc; Megumi Ishitani — One Piece Fan Letter; Norihiro Naganuma — The Apothecary Diaries; Yoshihiro Miyajima — Delicious in Dungeon
**Best Background Art**: **Frieren: Beyond Journey's End — Madhouse**‡; Dandadan — Science SARU; Delicious in Dungeon — Studio Trigger; Demon Slayer: Kimetsu no Yaiba Hashira Training Arc — Ufotable; Pluto — Studio M2; The Apothecary Diaries — Toho Animation Studio and OLM	**Best Action**: **Solo Leveling — A-1 Pictures**‡; Bleach: Thousand Year Blood War – The Conflict — Pierrot Films; Dandadan — Science SARU; Demon Slayer: Kimetsu no Yaiba Hashira Training Arc — Ufotable; Kaiju No. 8 — Production I.G; Wind Breaker — CloverWorks
**Best Comedy**: **Mashle: Magic and Muscles The Divine Visionary Candidate Exam Arc — A-1 Pictures**‡; Delicious in Dungeon — Studio Trigger; KonoSuba: God's Blessing on This Wonderful World! (season 3) — Drive; My Deer Friend Nokotan — Wit Studio; Ranma ½ — MAPPA; Spy × Family (season 2) — Wit Studio and CloverWorks	**Best Drama**: **Frieren: Beyond Journey's End — Madhouse**‡; A Sign of Affection — Ajiado; Dead Dead Demon's Dededede Destruction — Production +h.; Oshi no Ko (season 2) — Doga Kobo; Pluto — Studio M2; The Apothecary Diaries — Toho Animation Studio and OLM
**Best Isekai Anime**: **Re:Zero − Starting Life in Another World (season 3) — White Fox**‡; KonoSuba: God's Blessing on This Wonderful World! (season 3) — Drive; Mushoku Tensei: Jobless Reincarnation (season 2 cour 2) — Studio Bind; Shangri-La Frontier (season 2) — C2C; Suicide Squad Isekai — Wit Studio; That Time I Got Reincarnated as a Slime (season 3) — Eight Bit	**Best Romance**: **Blue Box — Telecom Animation Film**‡; A Sign of Affection — Ajiado; Makeine: Too Many Losing Heroines! — A-1 Pictures; Ranma ½ — MAPPA; Scott Pilgrim Takes Off — Science SARU; The Dangers in My Heart (season 2) — Shin-Ei Animation
**Best Slice of Life**: **Makeine: Too Many Losing Heroines! — A-1 Pictures**‡; Laid-Back Camp (season 3) — Eight Bit; Mr. Villain's Day Off — Shin-Ei Animation and SynergySP; My Deer Friend Nokotan — Wit Studio; Sound! Euphonium (season 3) — Kyoto Animation; The Dangers in My Heart (season 2) — Shin-Ei Animation	**Best Main Character**: **Sung Jin-woo — Solo Leveling**‡; Frieren — Frieren: Beyond Journey's End; Kafka Hibino — Kaiju No. 8; Ken "Okarun" Takakura — Dandadan; Maomao — The Apothecary Diaries; Momo Ayase — Dandadan
**Best Supporting Character**: **Fern — Frieren: Beyond Journey's End**‡; Himmel — Frieren: Beyond Journey's End; Jinshi — The Apothecary Diaries; Seiko Ayase — Dandadan; Senshi — Delicious in Dungeon; Turbo Granny — Dandadan	**"Must Protect at All Costs" Character**: **Anya Forger — Spy × Family (season 2)**‡; Frieren — Frieren: Beyond Journey's End; Ken "Okarun" Takakura — Dandadan; Senshi — Delicious in Dungeon; Hōjō Tokiyuki — The Elusive Samurai; Yuki Itose — A Sign of Affection
**Best Anime Song**: **"Otonoke" by Creepy Nuts — Dandadan**‡; "Abyss" by Yungblud — Kaiju No. 8; "Bling-Bang-Bang-Born" by Creepy Nuts — Mashle: Magic and Muscles The Divine Visionary Candidate Exam Arc; "Fatal" by Gemn — Oshi no Ko (season 2); "Level" by SawanoHiroyuki[nZk]: Tomorrow X Together — Solo Leveling; "The Brave" by Yoasobi — Frieren: Beyond Journey's End	**Best Score**: **Hiroyuki Sawano — Solo Leveling**‡; Shirō Sagisu — Bleach: Thousand-Year Blood War – The Conflict; Kensuke Ushio — Dandadan; Yuki Kajiura and Go Shiina — Demon Slayer: Kimetsu no Yaiba Hashira Training Arc; Evan Call — Frieren: Beyond Journey's End; Haruka Nakamura — Look Back
**Best Opening Sequence**: **"Otonoke" by Creepy Nuts, storyboard and direction by Abel Góngora — Dandadan**‡; "Abyss" by Yungblud, direction by Kohei Nakajima and Hibiki Yoshizaki — Kaiju No. 8; "Bling-Bang-Bang-Born" by Creepy Nuts, storyboard and direction by Shun Enokido — Mashle: Magic and Muscles The Divine Visionary Candidate Exam Arc; "Fatal" by Gemn, storyboard and direction by Ryohei Takeshita — Oshi no Ko (season 2); "Level" by SawanoHiroyuki[nZk]: Tomorrow X Together, storyboard and direction by Choi In-seung — Solo Leveling; "Uuuuus!" by Hiroshi Kitadani, storyboard and direction by Megumi Ishitani — One Piece	**Best Ending Sequence**: **"Request" by Krage, storyboard and direction by Hiromu Ōshiro — Solo Leveling**‡; "Anta Nante" by Riria., storyboard by Minami Kitamura, direction by Minami Kitamura and Fumiyuki Uehara — Ranma ½; "Burning" by Hitsujibungaku, storyboard and direction by Naoya Nakayama — Oshi no Ko (season 2); "Kamakura Style" by BotchiBoromaru, storyboard and direction by Yuki Yonemuri — The Elusive Samurai; "Nobody" by OneRepublic, storyboard and direction by Toya Ooshima — Kaiju No. 8; "Taidada" by Zutomayo, storyboard by Moko-chan, direction by Moko-chan and Nick McKergow — Dandadan
**Best VA Performance (Japanese)**: **Aoi Yūki as Maomao — The Apothecary Diaries**‡; Atsumi Tanezaki as Frieren — Frieren: Beyond Journey's End; Kenichi Suzumura as Bravern — Brave Bang Bravern!; Shion Wakayama as Momo Ayase — Dandadan; Sayaka Senbongi as Marcille Donato — Delicious in Dungeon; Natsuki Hanae as Ken "Okarun" Takakura — Dandadan	**Best VA Performance (English)**: **Aleks Le as Sung Jin-woo — Solo Leveling**‡; A.J. Beckles as Ken "Okarun" Takakura — Dandadan; Jessie James Grelle as Armin Arlert — Attack on Titan: The Final Season The Final Chapters Special 2; Mallorie Rodak as Frieren — Frieren: Beyond Journey's End; Sarah Natochenny as Alisa Mikhailovna "Alya" Kujou — Alya Sometimes Hides Her Feelings in Russian; SungWon Cho as Senshi — Delicious in Dungeon
**Best VA Performance (Spanish)**: **Miguel Ángel Leal as Eren Jaeger — Attack on Titan: The Final Season The Final Chapters Special 2**‡; Alicia Vélez as Momo Ayase — Dandadan; Desireé González as Maomao — The Apothecary Diaries; Erika Ugalde as Frieren — Frieren: Beyond Journey's End; Luis Leonardo Suárez as Muzan Kibutsuji — Demon Slayer: Kimetsu no Yaiba Hashira Training Arc; Omar Sánchez as Kafka Hibino — Kaiju No. 8	**Best VA Performance (Castilian)**: **Masumi Mutsuda as Sung Jin-woo — Solo Leveling**‡; Ainhoa Maiquez as Miyo Saimori — My Happy Marriage; Clara Schwarze as Akane Tendo — Ranma ½; Jorge Peña as Senshi — Delicious in Dungeon; Mario Ballart as Kafka Hibino — Kaiju No. 8; Sandra Villa as Frieren — Frieren: Beyond Journey's End
**Best VA Performance (French)**: **Adrien Antoine as Kafka Hibino — Kaiju No. 8**‡; Audrey Sablé as Naomi Orthmann — Metallic Rouge; Jaynelia Coadou as Momo Ayase — Dandadan; Julien Allouf as Jinshi — The Apothecary Diaries; Marie Nonnenmacher as Frieren — Frieren: Beyond Journey's End; Martin Faliu as Ranma Saotome — Ranma ½	**Best VA Performance (Arabic)**: **Hiba Snobar as Anya Forger — Spy × Family (season 2)**‡; Basel Al Rifaiey as Loid Forger — Spy × Family (season 2); Julien Chaaya as Yoichi Isagi — Blue Lock (season 2); Lama AlSayyagh as Marcille Donato — Delicious in Dungeon; Mohammed Sami as Rin Itoshi — Blue Lock (season 2); Nawar AlMahairi as Laios Touden — Delicious in Dungeon
**Best VA Performance (German)**: **Daniel Schlauch as Monkey D. Luffy — One Piece**‡; Felix Kamin as Kafka Hibino — Kaiju No. 8; Florian Knorn as Ranma Saotome — Ranma ½; Franciska Friede as Momo Ayase — Dandadan; Jörg Hengstler as Kogoro Mori — Detective Conan: Black Iron Submarine; Magdalena Höfner as Marcille Donato — Delicious in Dungeon	**Best VA Performance (Italian)**: **Ilaria Pellicone as Kyomoto — Look Back**‡; Alessandro Pili as Kenma Kozume — Haikyu!! The Dumpster Battle; Andrea Oldani as Jinshi — The Apothecary Diaries; Katia Sorrentina as Neia Baraja — Overlord: The Sacred Kingdom; Martina Felli as Frieren — Frieren: Beyond Journey's End; Mattia Bressan as Kafka Hibino — Kaiju No. 8
**Best VA Performance (Portuguese)**: **Charles Emmanuel as Sung Jin-woo — Solo Leveling**‡; Bruna Laynes as Marcille Donato — Delicious in Dungeon; Celso Henrique as Sunraku — Shangri-La Frontier (season 1); Gigi Patta as Maomao — The Apothecary Diaries; Heitor Assali as Reno Ichikawa — Kaiju No. 8; Pedro Azevedo as Dot Barrett — Mashle: Magic and Muscles The Divine Visionary Candidate Exam Arc	**Best VA Performance (Hindi)**: **Lohit Sharma as Satoru Gojo — Jujutsu Kaisen (season 2)**‡; Abhishek Sharma as Einar — Vinland Saga (season 2); Natasha John as Frieren — Frieren: Beyond Journey's End; Rajesh Shukla as Sung Jin-woo — Solo Leveling; Ranjit R Tiwari as Yoichi Isagi — Blue Lock (season 2); Rushikesh Phunse as Kafka Hibino — Kaiju No. 8
**Global Impact Award**: **Attack on Titan**‡

=== Anime with multiple nominations and awards ===
Anime with multiple nominations (Note: Includes nominations for multiple seasons as well as related films, if any.)
Nominations	Anime
22	Dandadan
20	Frieren: Beyond Journey's End
16	Delicious in Dungeon
16	Kaiju No. 8
13	The Apothecary Diaries
13	Solo Leveling
8	Demon Slayer: Kimetsu no Yaiba
6	Ranma ½
6	Spy × Family (Note: Also including Spy × Family Code: White film)
5	Oshi no Ko
4	Mashle: Magic and Muscles
3	A Sign of Affection
3	Bleach: Thousand-Year Blood War
3	Blue Lock
3	Look Back
3	One Piece (Note: Also including One Piece Fan Letter)
2	Attack on Titan
2	The Dangers in My Heart
2	The Elusive Samurai
2	Haikyu!! The Dumpster Battle
2	KonoSuba: God's Blessing on This Wonderful World!
2	Makeine: Too Many Losing Heroines
2	Metallic Rouge
2	My Deer Friend Nokotan
2	My Hero Academia (Note: Also including My Hero Academia: You're Next film)
2	Shangri-La Frontier
2	Pluto

Anime with multiple wins (Note: Includes wins for multiple seasons as well as related films, if any.)
Wins	Anime
9	Solo Leveling
4	Frieren: Beyond Journey's End
3	Dandadan
2	Attack on Titan
2	Demon Slayer: Kimetsu no Yaiba
2	Look Back
2	Spy × Family

=== Studios with multiple nominations and awards ===
Studios with multiple nominations
Nominations	Studios	Anime(s)
24	Science SARU	Dandadan, The Colors Within, and Scott Pilgrim Takes Off
21	Madhouse	Frieren: Beyond Journey's End and Overlord: The Sacred Kingdom
19	A-1 Pictures	Solo Leveling, Mashle: Magic and Muscles, and Makeine: Too Many Losing Heroines
18	Production I.G	Kaiju No. 8 and Haikyu!! The Dumpster Battle
16	Studio Trigger	Delicious in Dungeon
13	Toho Animation Studio and OLM	The Apothecary Diaries
11	MAPPA	Ranma ½, Attack on Titan, Bucchigiri?!, Jujutsu Kaisen (season 2), and Vinland Saga (season 2)
9	Wit Studio	Spy × Family, My Deer Friend Nokotan, and Suicide Squad Isekai
9	CloverWorks	Spy × Family, The Elusive Samurai, and Wind Breaker
8	Ufotable	Demon Slayer: Kimetsu no Yaiba
7	Doga Kobo	Oshi no Ko, Jellyfish Can't Swim in the Night, and Alya Sometimes Hides Her Feelings in Russian
5	Toei Animation	One Piece and Girls Band Cry
4	Bones	My Hero Academia and Metallic Rouge
4	Eight Bit	Blue Lock and That Time I Got Reincarnated as a Slime (season 3)
3	Ajiado	A Sign of Affection
3	Pierrot Films	Bleach: Thousand-Year Blood War
3	Studio Durian	Look Back
2	Studio M2	Pluto

Studios with multiple wins
Wins	Studios	Anime(s)
11	A-1 Pictures	Solo Leveling, Mashle: Magic and Muscles, and Makeine: Too Many Losing Heroines
4	Madhouse	Frieren: Beyond Journey's End
3	MAPPA	Attack on Titan and Jujutsu Kaisen (season 2)
3	Science SARU	Dandadan
2	CloverWorks	Spy × Family
2	Studio Durian	Look Back
2	Ufotable	Demon Slayer: Kimetsu no Yaiba
2	Wit Studio	Spy × Family

== Presenters and performers ==
The following individuals, listed in order of appearance, presented awards or a short monologue:

Presenters
Names	Role
Ironmouse	Presented the award for "Must Protect at All Costs" Character
Gigguk	Presented the awards for Best New Series and Best Main Character
Paloma Mami	Presented the awards for Best Background Art and Best Drama
d4vd	Presented the awards for Best Character Design and Best Ending Sequence; introduced the tribute to the anime's influence on the entertainment industry
Benjamin Whittaker	Presented the awards for Best Action and Best Comedy
Plastique Tiara	Presented the awards for Best Supporting Character and Best Romance
J Balvin	Presented the award for Best Opening Sequence
Dean Fujioka	Presented the award for Best Animation
Saya Ichikawa	Presented the award for Best Isekai Anime
Finn Wolfhard; Gaten Matarazzo	Presented the award for Best Continuing Series
Chocolate Planet	Presented the award for Best Original Anime
Pabllo Vittar	Presented the award for Best Anime Song
Mayu Matsuoka	Presented the award for Best Slice of Life
Kanata Hongō	Presented the award for Best Score
Zak Penn	Presented the award for Best Director
Damiano David	Presented the Global Impact Award to Attack on Titan
Chloe Kim	Introduced the tribute to the power of anime
Rina Sawayama	Presented the award for Film of the Year
Kacey Musgraves	Presented the award for Anime of the Year

The following individuals, listed in order of appearance, performed musical numbers:

Performers
Names	Role	Work
Creepy Nuts	Performers	"Bling-Bang-Bang-Born" from Mashle: Magic and Muscles The Divine Visionary Candidate Exam Arc "Otonoke" from Dandadan
Flow	Performers	"Days" to commemorate the 20th anniversary of Eureka Seven
LiSA	Performer	"Crossing Field" from Sword Art Online "Datte Atashi no Hero" from the second season of My Hero Academia "Gurenge" from Demon Slayer: Kimetsu no Yaiba

== Ceremony information ==
Announced during Crunchyroll's industry panel at CCXP 2024 in São Paulo, Brazil, anime series released from October 2023 to December 2024 are eligible for this edition, with Crunchyroll further noting that future editions would feature anime series released from January to December. This edition featured 32 categories, including new categories for Best Background Art, Best Isekai Anime, and Best VA Performance (Hindi). Categories were revealed on December 6. Nominees were revealed on the first day of public voting, April 3. Voting closed on April 14. Presenters for the ceremony on May 25 was announced on April 3, and included presenters such as Brazilian drag pop icon and musician Pabllo Vittar, Canadian actor Finn Wolfhard, and Japanese comedy duo Chocolate Planet, with Sony Group Corporation CEO and President Hiroki Totoki giving opening remarks.

=== Controversies ===
Solo Leveling winning Anime of the Year was described as an upset by news outlets, as it is widely expected that the award would be won by Frieren: Beyond Journey's End or The Apothecary Diaries. The win sparked a debate among fans and critics; while Solo Leveling enjoyed significant popularity and won multiple categories, critics argued that Frieren and The Apothecary Diaries have broader critical acclaim and a more consistent narrative. The decision led some viewers to question whether the awards were prioritizing hype and recency over artistic merit. However, it is argued that due to the popularity and appeal of Solo Leveling over Frieren and The Apothecary Diaries, Solo Leveling deserved the title. Despite receiving 16 nominations, including Anime of the Year and Best Animation, Netflix's Delicious in Dungeon did not win a single award. This outcome led to speculation about a potential bias against non-Crunchyroll platforms, with many fans questioning whether the series was deliberately overlooked.
