= Ranma ½ (2024 TV series) =

2024 Japanese anime television series

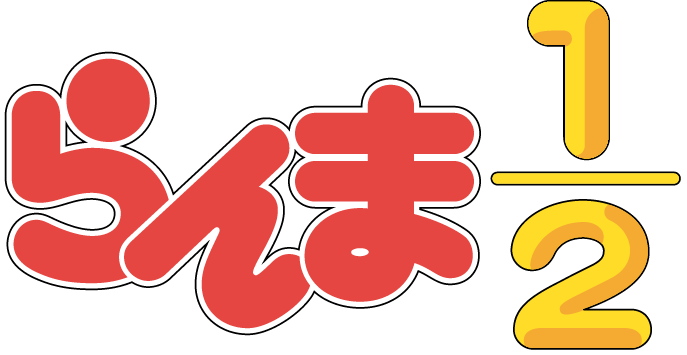
- らんま1/2; Ranma Nibun-no-Ichi
- Genre: Adventure; Martial arts; Romantic comedy
- Based on: Ranma ½ by Rumiko Takahashi
- Developed by: Kimiko Ueno
- Directed by: Kōnosuke Uda
- Voices of: Kappei Yamaguchi; Megumi Hayashibara; Noriko Hidaka; Akio Otsuka; Minami Takayama; Kikuko Inoue; Chō
- Narrated by: Kenichi Ogata
- Music by: Kaoru Wada
- Opening theme: List: "Iinazukekkyun" by Ano (S1); "Wo Ai Ni" by Wednesday Campanella (S2); "Sunao Miman" by Fumino (S3)
- Ending theme: List: "Anta Nante" by Riria (S1); "Panda Girl" by Nishina (S2); "Kawaikunai" by Yukia (S3)
- Country of origin: Japan
- Original language: Japanese
- No. of seasons: 3
- No. of episodes: 28

Production
- Producers: Emi Satō; Norihiro Hayashida; Ransen Imai; Shūhō Kondō (S1)
- Cinematography: Atsushi Kanō
- Animator: MAPPA
- Editor: Keisuke Yanagi
- Running time: 24 minutes
- Production companies: Shogakukan-Shueisha Productions (Note: Direct planning and production); Ranma 1/2 Project (Note: Production committee label consisting of various additional companies)

Original release
- Network: Nippon TV
- Release: October 6, 2024 – present

Related
- Ranma ½ (1989–1992)

Ranma ½ (Japanese: らんま1/2, Hepburn: Ranma Nibun-no-Ichi; pronounced Ranma One-Half in English and stylized as Ranma½) is the second anime television series adaptation of the manga series Ranma ½ by Rumiko Takahashi. It is produced by MAPPA, with Shogakukan-Shueisha Productions handling planning and production. The anime series is directed by Kōnosuke Uda and written by Kimiko Ueno. The series premiered on October 6, 2024, on Nippon Television and its NNS affiliates. The series is streamed worldwide on Netflix.

== Plot ==
On a training journey in the Bayankala Mountain Range in the Qinghai Province of China, Ranma Saotome and his father Genma fell into the cursed springs of Jusenkyo (呪泉郷). The cursed spring causes any afflicted to assume the physical form of whatever drowned there hundreds or thousands of years ago whenever they come into contact with cold water, which reverts on contact with hot water but resumes with exposure to cold water. Genma fell into the spring of a drowned panda while Ranma fell into the spring of a drowned girl.

Soun Tendo is a fellow practitioner of Musabetsu Kakutō Ryū (無差別格闘流) or "Anything-Goes School" of martial arts and owner of a dojo in Nerima. Genma and Soun agreed years ago that their children would marry and carry on the Tendo Dojo. Soun has three teenage daughters: the polite and easygoing Kasumi, the greedy and indifferent Nabiki and the short-tempered, martial arts practicing Akane. Akane, who is Ranma's age, is appointed for bridal duty by her sisters with the reasoning that they are the older sisters and can dump the duty on her, and that they all dislike the arranged engagement and think Akane's dislike of men is the right way to express it to the fathers. At the appointed time, the Saotomes arrive in their new forms given by the cursed springs, confusing the Tendos, and ultimately leading to Akane seeing Ranma changing from girl form to boy form in the tub, much to her horror. It takes several more pages for the situation to be explained to Soun Tendo and his daughters. Both Ranma and Akane refuse the engagement initially, having not been consulted on the decision, but the fathers are insistent and they are generally treated as betrothed and end up helping or saving each other on some occasions. They are frequently found in each other's company and are constantly arguing in their trademark awkward love-hate manner that is a franchise focus.

Ranma goes to school with Akane at Furinkan High School (風林館高校, Fūrinkan Kōkō), where he meets his recurring opponent Tatewaki Kuno, the conceited kendo team captain who aggressively pursues Akane, but also falls in love with Ranma's female form without ever discovering his curse (despite most other characters eventually knowing it). Nerima serves as a backdrop for more martial arts mayhem with the introduction of Ranma's regular rivals, such as the eternally lost Ryoga Hibiki who traveled halfway across Japan getting from the front of his house to the back, where Ranma spent three days waiting for him. Ryoga, seeking revenge on Ranma, followed him to Jusenkyo where he ultimately fell into the Spring of the Drowned Piglet. Now when splashed with cold water he takes the form of a little black pig. Not knowing this, Akane takes the piglet as a pet and names it P-chan, but Ranma knows and hates him for keeping this secret and taking advantage of the situation. Another rival is the nearsighted Mousse, who also fell into a cursed spring and becomes a duck when he gets wet, and finally, there is Genma and Soun's impish grand master, Happosai, who spends his time stealing the underwear of schoolgirls.

Ranma's prospective paramours include the martial arts rhythmic gymnastics champion (and Tatewaki's sister) Kodachi Kuno, and his second fiancée and childhood friend Ukyo Kuonji the okonomiyaki vendor, along with the Chinese Amazon Shampoo, supported by her great-grandmother Cologne. As the series progresses, the school becomes more eccentric with the return of the demented, Hawaii-obsessed Principal Kuno and the placement of the power-leeching alternating child/adult Hinako Ninomiya as Ranma's English teacher. Ranma's indecision in choosing his true love causes chaos in his romantic and school life.

== Production ==
A new anime television series adaptation was announced in Weekly Shōnen Sunday in June 2024. The anime is a remake of the original manga and animated by MAPPA, with Shogakukan-Shueisha Productions handling planning and production duties. It is directed by Kōnosuke Uda, with Kimiko Ueno handling series composition, Hiromi Taniguchi designing the characters, and Kaoru Wada composing the music. Most of the original Japanese voice cast for the main characters reprise their roles. The first season aired from October 6 to December 22, 2024, on Nippon Television and its NNS affiliates, (Note: Nippon TV listed the series premiere as airing on October 5, 2024, at 24:55, which is effectively October 6 at 12:55 a.m. JST.) with Netflix licensing it for weekly worldwide streaming immediately following each broadcast. Viz Media and Hot Topic hosted the world premiere of the first episode on August 23 during Anime NYC. Earlier that same month, it was reported that the entire first season was leaked online alongside several other Iyuno localization company works. Netflix responded to the leaks by issuing DMCA takedowns.

A second season was announced immediately following the conclusion of the first season. The staff and cast from the first season reprised their roles. It aired from October 5 to December 21, 2025. (Note: Nippon TV listed the season premiere as airing on October 4, 2025, at 24:55, which is effectively October 5 at 12:55 a.m. JST.)

A third season was announced in March 2026, which premiered on October 4 of the same year.

For the first season, the opening theme song is "Iinazukekkyun", performed by Ano, while the ending theme song is "Anta Nante", performed by Riria.

For the second season, the opening theme song is "Wo Ai Ni", performed by Wednesday Campanella, while the ending theme song is "Panda Girl", performed by Nishina.

For the third season, the opening theme is titled "Sunao Miman", performed by Fumino, while the ending theme is titled "Kawaikunai", performed by Yuika.

== Episodes ==
Season	Episodes	Originally released	
Season	Episodes	First released	Last released
1	12	October 6, 2024	December 22, 2024
2	12	October 5, 2025	December 21, 2025
3	TBA	October 4, 2026	TBA

=== Season 1 (2024) ===
No. overall	No. in season	Title	Directed by	Written by	Storyboarded by	Chief animation directed by	Original release date
1	1	"Here's Ranma"; Transliteration: "Ranma ga Kita" (Japanese: らんまが来た)	Kōnosuke Uda	Kimiko Ueno	Kōnosuke Uda	Hiromi Taniguchi	October 6, 2024
In 1980s Tokyo, the Martial Arts Tendo Dojo is home to Soun Tendo and his three daughters: the gentle eldest Kasumi, the sharp-witted middle sister Nabiki, and the hot-tempered youngest, Akane. One day, Soun announces that one of them will marry Ranma Saotome, the son of his longtime friend Genma. Ranma and Genma have spent years on a martial arts training journey, most recently traveling through China. Instead of the expected father and son, the Tendos are greeted by a panda and a red-haired girl who introduces herself as Ranma. Akane, grateful to not be tied to the engagement, shows Ranma around the dojo and spars with her, quickly forming a bond, until Ranma takes a hot bath and transforms into a boy, terrifying Akane. The panda then reveals himself as Genma and explains their curse. While both were training at the legendary Jusenkyo springs in China, both fell into cursed pools: Genma into the Spring of Drowned Panda and Ranma into the Spring of Drowned Girl. Cold water triggers their transformations, while hot water reverses them. Believing Akane is the best match due to her being the same age as Ranma, Soun, Kasumi, and Nabiki nominate her as Ranma's bride. Despite their similar personalities, both Ranma and Akane fiercely reject the engagement.
2	2	"I Hate Men!"; Transliteration: "Otoko Nanka Daikkirai" (Japanese: 男なんか大っ嫌い)	Nobuyoshi Arai	Kimiko Ueno	Kōnosuke Uda	Yoshiko Saito	October 13, 2024
Ranma is told by Genma to start attending Furinkan High School, which Akane and Nabiki currently go to. En route, Ranma is splashed by cold water and is taken by Akane to the clinic of local chiropractor Dr. Tofur, whom Akane has a crush on, to get hot water. Upon arriving at Furinkan High, Akane is ambushed by most of the male students at the school, all of whom she defeats swiftly in battle. She is then confronted by upperclassmen Tatewaki Kuno, the captain of the school's Kendo Club with a crush on Akane. Upon discovering Ranma's engagement with Akane, he furiously challenges him to a battle, one in which Ranma is able to overpower Kuno. Akane later explains that Kuno challenged the male student body to fighting Akane, saying that whomsoever defeats her, gets to date her. Later during a rematch between Ranma and Kuno, Ranma transforms. Later, Kuno confesses to Ranma in his female form (whom he refers to as "the pigtailed girl"), not realizing that she and Ranma are the same person.
3	3	"Because There's Someone He Likes"; Transliteration: "Sukinahito ga Iru Ndakara" (Japanese: 好きな人がいるんだから)	Tadahito Matsubayashi	Kimiko Ueno	Tadahito Matsubayashi	Takeshi Yoshioka	October 20, 2024
Nabiki, who is Kuno's classmate, discovers that he is infatuated with both Akane and Ranma's female form, and quickly turns the situation into a business opportunity. She secretly takes photos of Ranma as a girl alongside Akane and sells them to Kuno for profit. Despite Ranma's attempts to expose the truth, Kuno remains too oblivious to realize that Ranma and the "pigtailed girl" are the same person, instead believing he has the rare fortune of loving two different girls. When word spreads around Furinkan High that Kuno intends to pursue both Akane and the mysterious pigtailed girl, the male students who once challenged Akane daily for the right to date her abandon their efforts, leaving her unexpectedly free of constant fights. Later, after Akane injures Ranma during one of her angry outbursts, they visit Dr. Tofu's clinic. There, Ranma learns that Dr. Tofu is hopelessly in love with Kasumi, a long-standing issue that has quietly bothered Akane. Shortly after, Ranma sprains his leg and cannot walk. Akane offers him a piggyback ride, but Ranma refuses out of pride. In response, Akane splashes him with cold water to turn him into a girl and carries her home, leading Ranma to realize her kindness beneath her rough exterior.
4	4	"The Hunter"; Transliteration: "Ranma o Otte Kita Otoko" (Japanese: 乱馬を追ってきた男)	Parako Shinohara	Kimiko Ueno	Mitsue Yamazaki	Nao Ōtsu	October 27, 2024
One morning at Furinkan High, Ranma is ambushed by Ryoga Hibiki, a martial artist who wants revenge against Ranma, although Ranma doesn't seem to recognize him. Ryoga later explains that he and Ranma used to attend an all-boys middle school together (which Ranma only attended for a short time due to his ongoing training). There, Ryoga challenged Ranma to a fight but Ranma failed to show up, fueling Ryoga's desire for a revenge. Ranma recalls this and explains that he waited at the agreed-upon place for the fight for three days, but due to Ryoga's extremely poor sense of direction, he ended up reaching there on the fourth day, by which time Ranma had already left. Ten days later, Ryoga challenges Ranma to a fight again, wanting to settle their unfinished score. During the fight, Ryoga learns of Ranma's curse, something which makes him even more enraged at Ranma. As Akane and Ranma end up having an argument with each other in the middle of the fight when he brushes off her concern for her, Ryoga's missed attack chops off Akane's long hair.
5	5	"Who Says You're Cute"; Transliteration: "Kawaikunē" (Japanese: かわいくねえ)	Taro Kubo	Kimiko Ueno	Ikuo Morimoto	Hiromi Taniguchi	November 3, 2024
Akane walks away from Ranma and Ryoga without a word. She grew her hair long to imitate Kasumi and appear more feminine, believing it would woo Dr. Tofu away from Kasumi. Akane breaks down at Dr. Tofu's clinic and confesses her feelings, allowing her to emotionally move on and leave light-hearted. On her way home, Ranma apologizes for her earlier behavior, and Akane's playful side surfaces, easing the tension between them. Ryoga, still seeking revenge against Ranma, sneaks into the Tendo home during a storm, but quickly retreats. Ranma begins to suspect Ryoga may also be cursed by a spring from Jusenkyo. Soon after, Akane discovers a small black piglet shivering in her room and decides to adopt it as a pet, naming him "P-chan". She asks Ranma to bathe it in hot water, and to his shock the pig transforms into Ryoga, who explains that he fell into the Spring of Drowned Black Piglet after being knocked in by Ranma's female form in China, fueling his hatred. Ranma transforms him back into a pig and chases him off, but Akane rescues the "piglet" and, unaware it is Ryoga, dotes on and sleeps with him, causing Ryoga to fall deeply in love with her.
6	6	"Kodachi, The Black Rose"; Transliteration: "Kuro Bara no Kodachi" (Japanese: 黒バラの小太刀)	Yoji Sato	Erika Ando	Tomohisa Shimoyama	Takeshi Yoshioka	November 10, 2024
The Furinkan High girls' rhythmic gymnastics team has an upcoming match with Kodachi, a student from the St. Bacchus School in a fight of martial arts rhythmic gymnastics in one week. The team appeals to Akane to fill in for them as they believe only she can take on the yet-to-be-defeated Kodachi, to which Akane agrees. That night, Kodachi breaks into the Tendo Dojo, wanting to swiftly eliminate Akane before the upcoming match. Kodachi fails to do so, but before leaving, she encounters and desperately falls in love with Ranma. The next morning, Kodachi declares to Akane that Ranma will be the prize in their upcoming gymnastics battle. They also learn that Kodachi is Kuno's younger sister. Akane trains for the upcoming match with help from Ranma and Ryoga, as her abilities at rhythmic gymnastics improve gradually. The night before the match however, Akane ends up tripping and injuring her leg, leaving her unable to compete. With no last-minute substitute available, Ranma is (unwillingly) turned into his female form by Ryoga in order to fill in for Akane.
7	7	"Hot Competition"; Transliteration: "Nettō Shintaisō" (Japanese: 熱闘新体操)	Yasuhiro Geshi	Erika Ando	Hiroko Kazui	Yoshiko Saito	November 17, 2024
As Ryoga helps Ranma train for the match, he reveals that his ultimate intention is to put Ranma out of commission, so that she loses the match and is forced to date Kodachi, leaving Akane free for Ryoga to pursue. Ranma, however, doesn't let Ryoga get the upper hand and trains with him all night long. On the day of the match, Ranma is extremely sleep-deprived and Kodachi keeps using unlawful ways to sabotage Ranma during the match. Ranma, however, is able to gain the upper hand and turn the tide of the battle on Kodachi and win. Kodachi, however, chooses to continue her pursuit of Ranma, which she terms is now fueled by a new, burning passion, much to Ranma's dismay.
8	8	"Darling Charlotte"; Transliteration: "Aishi no Sharurotto" (Japanese: 愛しのシャルロット)	Nobuyoshi Arai	Misaki Morie	Nobuyoshi Arai	Nao Ōtsu	November 24, 2024
After a trip to the local ice-skating rink, Akane loses P-chan. As she begs Ranma to help him look for her, Ranma finds P-chan in the possession of a young girl named Azuza Shiratori, a kleptomaniac who is obsessed with stealing and possessing various objects as her own. Azuza's companion Mikado Sanzenin returns P-chan to Akane and attempts to make advances on her, irritating Ranma. Seeing this, Mikado challenges Ranma and Akane to a martial arts figure skating match, in which the winner will get to keep P-chan. The two also learn that Mikado and Azuza are the famed "Golden Pair" of Kolkhoz High School, which have separated every couple in skating matches thus far. While training for said match, Ranma, inefficient at ice skating, trains with Akane in his female form (considering it too embarrassing for a guy to be bad at ice skating), before being picked up and forcibly kissed by Mikado, humiliating Ranma as her first kiss is stolen by a boy. Transforming back into a boy via a communal bath, Ranma savagely beats up Mikado to Azuza's delight while being badly injured himself. Back home, while patching up Ranma's injuries, Akane dares Ranma to kiss her, to which they almost do, before being interrupted by the Tendo family, who were watching in high anticipation.
9	9	"I'll Never Let Go"; Transliteration: "Kono-te wa Hanasanai" (Japanese: この手ははなさない)	Parako Shinohara	Misaki Morie	Parako Shinohara	Hiromi Taniguchi	December 1, 2024
Before the match begins, Mikado declares to Ranma that he plans to kiss Akane during the fight, worrying Ranma. He later advises Akane to stay away from Mikado. During the fight, Ranma and Akane fare off well against the Golden Pair, even surviving their dreaded "Couple Break-Up Spin" attack. Ryoga (who has been so far chained to the trophy in his pig form), turns back into his human form. In an effort to remove Ranma from the match and partner up with Akane and win her over, Ryoga turns Ranma into a girl (after dimming the lights) only to accidentally end up sending Akane to the crowd and getting paired up with Ranma. The fight resumes with Ryoga and Ranma facing off against Mikado and Azuza, but their rivalry and fighting gets in the way of their cooperation. Ryoga, angered by Ranma's taunts about always wanting to impress Akane, ends up breaking the ice rink, causing it to split into various flat icebergs.
10	10	"Kiss of Death"; Transliteration: "Shi no Seppun" (Japanese: 死の接吻)	Tomoko Hiramuki & Yusuke Kurinishi	Misaki Morie	Tadahito Matsubayashi	Tsuyoshi Yoshioka	December 8, 2024
Ranma and Ryoga realize they must work together to defeat Mikado and Azuza, successfully baiting them and winning the match. However, Ryoga immediately turns on Ranma, determined to settle their rivalry in the shattered rink. Akane intervenes, demanding an explanation, but the ice collapses beneath her. Unable to swim, she sinks into the freezing lake, forcing Ranma and Ryoga to dive in and rescue her. Akane later awakens safely in the infirmary, surrounded by Ranma in her female form, her friends, and P-chan. The calm is shattered when a Chinese Amazon named Shampoo smashes through the wall, attempting to kill Ranma. SHe narrowly survives and explains her past with Shampoo to Akane: while wandering China in their cursed forms, Ranma and Genma encountered an all-female Amazon tribe. Ranma accidentally ate Shampoo's ceremonial feast prize, prompting her to challenge her. She defeated her, earning the "Kiss of Death", a vow that she would hunt him down and kill him for dishonor. Back in Japan, Shampoo follows Genma to the Tendo Dojo and attacks Akane while searching for Ranma, who protects Akane and defeats Shampoo again in his male form. Expecting another Kiss of Death, he is instead met with a kiss on the lips from Shampoo.
11	11	"You I Love"; Transliteration: "Wǒ Ài Nǐ" (Chinese: 我愛你)	Tokio Igarashi	Kimiko Ueno	Tokio Igarashi	Yoshiko Saito	December 15, 2024
Shampoo explains that, according to Chinese Amazon Law, if an Amazon is defeated by a female outsider, then she must give that woman the Kiss of Death and promptly kill her; however, if the outsider is a man, the Amazon must grant him the "Kiss of Marriage" and promise to marry him, effectively making Ranma engaged to Shampoo. Shampoo immediately starts fawning over Ranma, much to the anger and dismay of Akane, who furiously declares that her engagement to Ranma is cancelled. While Akane wonders whether or not Ranma's feelings for her are genuine, Ranma is torn between Shampoo's infatuation for his male form and bloodthirst for his female form. The next day at school, Shampoo discovers Ryoga in his P-chan form and, not knowing his human identity, decides to cook him and feed him to Ranma in his class. P-chan survives this and Akane snatches him away when Shampoo tries to serve the "meal". Angered at the interference, Shampoo gives Akane the Kiss of Death, which Akane agrees to settle with a fight in the school courtyard. Accidentally knocked unconscious by Akane prior, Ranam ends up arriving only when the fight is over. He finds Akane unconscious but alive. When he wakes her up, however, Akane has no idea who he is.
12	12	"Shampoo Cleans Up"; Transliteration: "Hissatsu Shanpū" (Japanese: 必殺シャンプー)	Yoji Sato	Kimiko Ueno	Ikuo Morimoto	Nao Ōtsu	December 22, 2024
Ranma realizes Akane is suffering from selective amnesia that affects only her memories of him. Consulting Dr. Tofu, he learns Shampoo used a forbidden Shiatsu technique that erases specific memories by applying special herbal shampoos to acupressure points. Genma confirms the effect can be reversed with a rare antidote, Shampoo Blend 119. Ranma tries to travel to China to obtain it, but encounters Shampoo, who already possesses the blend. After a fight, she agrees to give it to him on the condition that he kill the female Ranma. Back at the dojo, Ranma tries to fake female Ranma's death by asking Ryoga to beat him severely, but only Soun and Genma comply. Akane interrupts the chaos, and in frustration, Ranma insults her with the same phrases he always used before. The familiar words trigger her buried memories, and after Ranma does it enough times, Akane remembers Ranma. Shampoo arrives and, seeing Akane's memories restored, attempts to kill her. Ranma intervenes and reveals his secret, transforming into his female form in front of Shampoo. Shocked and devastated, Shampoo initially attacks him before breaking down in tears and leaving, leaving Ranma feeling remorseful.

=== Season 2 (2025) ===
No. overall	No. in season	Title	Directed by	Written by	Storyboarded by	Chief animation directed by	Original release date
13	1	"Ranma's Weakness"; Transliteration: "Ranma no Jakuten" (Japanese: らんまの弱点)	Taro Kubo	Akane Takahashi	Mitsue Yamasaki	Nao Ōtsu	October 5, 2025
Hikaru Gosunkugi, who has a one-sided crush on Akane, tries to find Ranma's weakness in order to expose him for his engagement to Akane. Gosunkugi uses unconventional methods to try to undercover Ranma's weakness. He repeatedly fails, including via an encounter with Kuno, until one night Kasumi mentions that Ranma is scared by cats while she is taking care of the neighbor's cat. The fear started as a result of Genma having tried to get Ranma to learn a secret technique by repeatedly throwing him into a pit full of cats. To try and recreate the scenario, Gosunkugi tricks Ranma into being surrounded by cats under the school gym. Becoming overwhelmed after a tiger is revealed among the cats, Ranma awakens his strongest technique, the "Cat Fist", in which he behaves and fights like a cat. After beating up the tiger, Ranma (under the influence of his cat persona) kisses Akane when she is trying to calm him down, to the shock of everyone. An embarrassed Akane sends Ranma flying until he falls into a pool, waking as a girl with no memory of what happened.
14	2	"Attack of the Wild Mousse"; Transliteration: "Mūsu Shūrai" (Japanese: ムース襲来)	Ryota Tachibana	Erika Ando	Hiroyuki Oshima	Takeshi Yoshioka	October 12, 2025
Ranma learns he kissed Akane while acting like a cat, but he denies it. As Gosunkugi shows Ranma the photo of him kissing Akane as proof, Kuno and Ryoga arrive at the Tendo Dojo and beat him up, thinking it was intentional. At Dr. Tofu's clinic, Ranma runs into Akane, who is still flustered from the kiss, while a pink cat is spying on them. The cat enters Ranma's bath and reveals herself to be Shampoo, to Ranma's shock, just as Akane catches the two of them naked. The next day, Shampoo and her great-grandmother Cologne visit the Tendo Dojo, revealing that they have settled in Japan. She later explains to Ranma that she fell into the Spring of the Drowned Cat during her remedial training. A chase breaks out with Ranma and Cologne, only for the old woman to tap Ranma in the chest with her cane before fleeing. Later, Shampoo's childhood friend, Mousse, arrives and challenges Ranma for Akane's hand despite Shampoo having ; however, Ranma discovers that Cologne had triggered a pressure point known as the "Full Body Cat Tongue", which makes him unable to touch hot water, thus leaving him stuck in his female form.
15	3	"Chestnuts Roasting on an Open Fire"; Transliteration: "Kachū Tenshin Amaguriken" (Japanese: 火中天津甘栗拳)	Nobuyoshi Arai	Erika Ando	Nobuyoshi Arai	Yoshiko Saito	October 19, 2025
Ranma fights Mousse in her female form. When Akane tells Dr. Tofu about Ranma's predicament, Dr. Tofu uses the "Tokyo Grandpa Point" technique on Ranma, allowing her to revert to his male form and knock Mousse out. Despite Ranma's victory, Dr. Tofu reveals the method can be used only once, and Ranma returns to his female form in the rain. Shampoo informs Ranma and Akane about the Phoenix Pill, a special antidote that reverses the effects of the pressure point and is in Cologne's possession. Ranma attempts to take the Phoenix Pill from Cologne, but is unsuccessful. After Ranma works a part-time job at the Cat Cafe, Cologne instructs Ranma to master "Chestnuts Roasting on an Open Fire", a Chinese technique in which the user pulls chestnuts out of a fire with their bare hands. However, due to the Full Body Cat Tongue, Ranma cannot perfect the technique. While going to the summer festival with the Tendos, Ranma masters the technique in a goldfish scooping game and faces Cologne once again for the Phoenix Pill. But when Ranma eats the pill, Cologne reveals that she switched the Phoenix Pill with a gummy candy.
16	4	"Naval Engagement"; Transliteration: "Marin Uōzu" (Japanese: マリンウォーズ)	Parako Shinohara	Misaki Morie	Parako Shinohara	Kōsuke Kawamura	October 26, 2025
Ranma goes to the beach after finding out the Cat Cafe is working there for the summer. In order to take the Phoenix Pill, she participates in a watermelon race, in which the winner receives a kiss from Shampoo. Unfortunately, thinking Ranma is attempting to cheat on Akane, she, Genma, and Soun also participate. After their antics get all of them disqualified, Ranma challenges Cologne to an all-out fight for the pill. But during the battle, she quickly puts Ranma on the ropes, with her water techniques and the help of a shark. Akane dives in to help, but almost drowns due to her inability to swim, forcing Ranma to save her. Realizing she needs an edge to defeat Cologne, Ranma talks Shampoo into helping him with the fight and dives into the ocean with her so that Shampoo can transform into cat form. Akane catches onto his plan, and when the terrified Ranma leaps out of the water with cat Shampoo, she continues to press Shampoo against her, triggering Ranma's Cat Fist persona and allowing her to defeat Cologne's shark, before Akane calms her down. Impressed at Ranma's tenacity and use of such skill, Cologne surrenders the pill, allowing Ranma to become a man again.
17	5	"It's Fast or It's Free"; Transliteration: "Kakutō Demae Rēsu" (Japanese: 格闘出前レース)	Michel Sugimoto	Akane Takahashi	Michel Sugimoto	Michel Sugimoto (Note: Being the only animation director credited in the episode, a chief position was not necessary.)	November 2, 2025
After Kuno wakes up from dreaming about Akane and "the pigtailed girl", he tells Akane his feelings, but becomes conflicted when Ranma appears as "the pigtailed girl" after she falls into the pond during her training with Genma. Kuno declares that Akane or Ranma will become his true love if either of the two first arrives at his home residence. Meanwhile, Cologne learns about the Martial Arts Takeout race, deciding to enroll Shampoo in it to compete against Ranma and Akane. Through a lottery system, Kuno's home is selected as the finish line for the Martial Arts Takeout race, though he remains oblivious to this and assumes they are there for his competition. When Ranma, Akane, and Shampoo arrive, he mistakes their arrival as a token of love to him. Kuno is then forced to eat one of the three meals as a tiebreaker for the three-way tie between Ranma, Akane and Shampoo. Shampoo actively tries to sabotage Akane in order to go on a date with Ranma. She manages to get Akane disqualified by forcing Ranma to eat a part of Akane's takeout. Kuno ends up eating Ranma's food believing it was from "the pigtailed girl", causing Ranma to win the takeout race.
18	6	"The Evil Wakes"; Transliteration: ""Jaaku" no Fukkatsu" (Japanese: “邪悪”の復活)	Yusuke Kurinishi	Misaki Morie	Jun Shishido	Takeshi Yoshioka	November 9, 2025
Happosai, Genma and Soun's master, breaks free from his imprisonment. While finding his two students, he runs into Akane and Ranma. Back at the dojo, Genma and Soun explain how Happosai treated the two as slaves before they sealed him in the Hida Mountains. When Happosai reveals that he plans to have either Genma or Soun as his successor of Anything Goes Martial of Arts, Genma instead lets Happosai train Ranma. That night, the pedophilic Happosai attempts to sleep with Akane. Ranma and Ryoga stop Happosai, but they are easily defeated. Dressed as "P-chan", Happosai sleeps with Akane, who unconsciously hits him. Annoyed about Happosai's perverted behavior, Ranma has Akane sew a special patch that repels woman from Happosai. However, Ranma learns that Happosai relies on touches of a woman as a source of life energy. Genma and Soun subsequently trap Happosai in a box. Feeling guilty, Ranma releases Happosai, who only attacks him in return. Genma and Happosai then engage in a kaiju-style standoff in the city, but, during the standoff, Genma loses his energy and returns to his normal form and later ends with Happosai become exhausted after using all of his energy.
19	7	"Instant Spring"; Transliteration: "Sokuseki Nanniichuan" (Japanese: 即席男溺泉)	Taro Kubo	Erika Ando	Tadahito Matsubayashi	Kōsuke Kawamura	November 16, 2025
Shampoo explains about a special powder that turn any source of water into a antidote for any cursed springs. She offers it to Ranma in exchange for a date. Ranma tries to take the powder but Shampoo outsmarts him throughout their date. Meanwhile, a man known as the "Dojo Destroyer" comes to the Tendo Dojo and steals its sign. He offers to return it if anyone in the Tendo Dojo can beat him in a match. Akane takes on him but she can't beat him due to her injured hand. However, Ranma shows up with Shampoo and is given an ultimatum between the powder or Akane. Ranma ends up saving Akane and beating the Dojo Destroyer but manages to save the powder. Ranma and Genma are able to jump into the pond and stay as men; however, they changed into their cursed forms during the rain. Back at the Cat Cafe, Cologne reveals that the powder from Shampoo works as a one time only.
20	8	""Okonomiyaki" Means "I Love You""; Transliteration: "Okonomiyaki no Ukyō" (Japanese: お好み焼きの右京)	Yoji Sato	Akane Takahashi	Yoji Sato	Yoshiko Saito	November 23, 2025
Genma is challenged in a fight against a mysterious person wielding a giant spatula named Ukyo, who claimed to be "left behind". When Ranma sees Genma injured, he tries to chase after Ukyo, but Genma stops him. Later that day at school, Ukyo transfers into Ranma's class. Ranma recognizes Ukyo as "Ucchan", his childhood friend. Angered that Ranma doesn't remember what he did to upset Ukyo, Ukyo challenges him to a fight after school. During their fight, Ranma gets the upper hand, damages Ukyo’s giant spatula and the two crash into the school's gym. Inside, Ranma is shocked to find out that Ukyo is actually a girl that was promised to be engaged to him from ten years ago. Genma reveals that he offhandedly promised Ukyo's father a marriage between Ranma and Ukyo in order to claim possession of a okonomiyaki cart that Ukyo's father intended as a dowry. Ranma repairs Ukyo’s giant spatula and gets into a fight with Akane. After seeing Ranma and Akane argue, Ukyo decides to let go of the past and, as Ranma's third fiancée, plans to win him over as well.
21	9	"Love Letters in the Sauce"; Transliteration: "Kanpekina Rabu Retā" (Japanese: 完璧なラブレター)	Ryota Kitsunai	Misaki Morie	Noriyo Sasaki	Nao Ōtsu	November 30, 2025
While at school, Ranma runs into Ryoga, who is frustrated to find out Ranma has gained another fiancée. Ryoga attacks Ukyo thinking that she is a boy. Ranma intervenes and reveals Ukyo's chest in which Ranma knockouts Ryoga. Ryoga wakes up in the nurse's office with Akane comforting him. Ukyo plots to have Ryoga and Akane go on a date, freeing her up to date Ranma. She delivers a love letter to Akane on Ryoga's behalf, who mistakes it for a challenge. Later that day, Ukyo tells Ranma about her plan. The next day, Akane arrives at Ukyo's okonomiyaki restaurant to find out Ukyo actually put her on a date with Ryoga, who arrives after getting lost. Ukyo leaves Akane and Ryoga to have their date but an envious Ranma arrives in his female form and interrupts as "Ryoga's fiancée". Akane notices Ranma's disguise, but Ryoga and Ukyo did not. The next day, Akane invites Ryoga on a regular date just for Ranma and Ukyo to follow. While on a lake, they get into a full-fledged argument with Ranma falling into the water. Feeling that Akane doesn't deserve him, Ryoga runs off but ends up turning into P-chan from the water sprinkler. Akane finds P-chan, who nevertheless stays by her side.
22	10	"Not Your Typical Juliet"; Transliteration: "Jurietto Gēmu" (Japanese: ジュリエットゲーム)	Parako Shinohara	Erika Ando	Akiko Kudo	Takeshi Yoshioka	December 7, 2025
The drama club enlists Akane to play as the female lead in a school competition. Akane quickly rejects and offers Ranma, in his female form, to play a female lead instead. But when she learns the drama club are doing Romeo and Juliet, Akane changes her mind and agrees to play her dream role of Juliet. At the same time, Kuno, Gosunkugi and Happosai fight over playing Romeo. Ranma hears about a special visit to China as the school prize and decides to perform in the play. On the day of the play, Akane and Ranma perform the balcony scene, but chaos ensues when Kuno, Gosunkugi and Happosai intervene. When female Ranma, who forcibly takes Akane's place as "Juliet", "kisses" Kuno in front of Akane, she gets upset and storms off, but Gosunkugi renders Akane unconscious. In an improvised scene, Ranma nervously struggles to kiss Akane in front of the audience. Akane wakes up, helps Ranma, and kisses him except she puts the tape over Ranma's mouth like he did to Kuno earlier. When Ranma and Akane return home, they learn the actual prize is having a feast with the contest judge from China, much to Ranma's dismay.
23	11	"Abduction of ...Akane?"; Transliteration: "Sarawa-reta Akane" (Japanese: さらわれたあかね)	Yoshiyuki Kaneko	Kimiko Ueno	Yoshiyuki Kaneko	Yoshiko Saito	December 14, 2025
Akane wins a stuffed pig from a lottery, but gets attacked by a disguised Mousse, who takes her stuffed pig while mistaking it for Akane. At the festival, Mousse appears before Ranma, Akane and Shampoo, but they ignore him. During the circus performance, the ringmaster offers Akane's stuffed pig as a gift if someone volunteers for an act. Akane, furious about Ranma making jokes about comparing her to the stuffed pig, throws Ranma who is then chained to the board. Mousse, now in the form of a duck, throws knives at Ranma. Revealing that he fell into the Spring of the Drowned Duck, Mousse swears revenge and chases Ranma around the festival. Furious that Ranma doesn't return her feelings, Shampoo chases Ranma in her cat form. Mousse later kidnaps Akane and places her in a water tank to splash her with water from the Spring of Drowned Duck, but Ranma and Shampoo intervene. Shampoo rejects Mousse's love for her. Ranma tries to cheer up Mousse, but Mousse attacks him with the hose containing the cursed spring. After Ranma manages to stop the hose attacks, Akane ends up getting doused, much to his shock.
24	12	"Fowl Play"; Transliteration: "Ganbare Mūsu" (Japanese: がんばれムース)	Kōnosuke Uda	Kimiko Ueno	Kōnosuke Uda	Yoshiko Saito & Kōsuke Kawamura	December 21, 2025
Ranma finds "Akane" in a duck form and attempts to change her back, but to no avail. At Soun's behest, Ranma agrees to marry the duck Akane in order to atone, but the real Akane arrives mid-ceremony, revealing that she got doused with regular water due to Mousse not having enough water to pull off the feat. Later, Akane tells Ranma to fight Mousse in a rematch and let him defeat Ranma in order to win Shampoo's heart. However, Shampoo plans to sabotage the rematch in order to make Ranma win so she can go on a date with him. Throughout the battle, Ranma defeats Mousse, but Mousse gets persistent until he passes out while standing. After Shampoo sprays Mousse with cold water, she carries him and walks away. The next day, Ranma and Akane check on Shampoo keeping Mousse in his duck form. Ranma gets splashed into his female form while Akane comments that gender and appearance don't matter. They continue to head to school, hitting Kuno along the way with a drop kick.

=== Season 3 (2026) ===
No. overall	No. in season	Title	Directed by	Written by	Storyboarded by	Chief animation directed by	Original release date
25	1	"Training Meals"; Transliteration: "Shugyou DE dina" (Japanese: 修行DEディナー)	Shinohara Parako	Kimiko Ueno	Kōnosuke Uda	Kosuke Kawamura	October 4, 2026
Ryoga sends another challenge to Ranma via the mail, but as P-Chan, Cologne catches and tries to boil him before she learns his rivalry with Ranma and love for Akane. She offers to take Ryoga as her apprentice so he can defeat Ranma and claim Akane, freeing Ranma to marry Shampoo, but Ryoga refuses and faces Ranma, who simply defeats him. Ranma subsequently realizes that his encounters with Cologne have made him much stronger. Akane tells this to Ryoga, who frustratedly accepts Cologne's offer. The next day, Ranma and Genma head to the mountains to train for the summer, at the same time and relative location Cologne is training Ryoga. Akane tags along, desiring to cook for Ranma. She attempts to make curry rice with kusaya for him and Genma after Ranma offhandedly mentioned wanting some, but she has no cooking skill and makes an inedible dish that nearly leaves Ranma and Genma sick. Ranma tries to tough it out, but Ryoga stumbles on their camp and tries the dish. Before Ranma and Ryoga can get into another fight, Cologne intervenes and agrees to set a date for the duel one week later, which Ranma accepts.
26	2	"The Breaking Point"; Transliteration: "Bakusai tenketsu" (Japanese: 爆砕点穴)	Kōnosuke Uda	Kimiko Ueno	Kōnosuke Uda	Riko Kaneda	October 11, 2026
Akane and Ranma discover that Cologne is teaching Ryoga a technique called "Breaking Point", where the user can shatter an object into pieces with just the touch of a finger on its pressure points; she repeatedly bludgeons Ryoga with a boulder to have him learn the technique through sheer attrition. Ranma and Akane become worried that Cologne intends to have Ryoga kill Ranma with the devastating technique, so Genma begins teaching Ranma countermoves. By the end of the week, both Ryoga and Ranma learn their respective techniques. As the battle commences, Ranma is able to dodge and counterattack Ryoga's use of Breaking Point, but it is soon revealed that Cologne's methods doubled as endurance training, making him incredibly resistant to all of Ranma's attacks. Ranma flees into the woods to buy time for a plan, eventually using Chestnuts Roasting On An Open Fire repeatedly on Ryoga to wear him down with repeated precise strikes and claim victory. After both combatants fall into a river, Cologne reveals to the female Ranma that Breaking Point can only affect inanimate objects, much to her dismay. Afterwards, Ryoga concedes defeat, only to re-appear as P-chan back at the dojo.
27	3	"Happy and Cologne"; Transliteration: "Happy to Cologne" (Japanese: ハッピーとコロン)	Ai Kondō	Minako Kawanabe	Hiroyuki Hata	Kosuke Kawamura	October 18, 2026
The Tendo Dojo household goes to the beach for the summer, with Happosai stowing away with them. Shampoo and Cologne are also operating their summer Cat Cafe stall there. In order to get Happosai and Cologne off their back, Ranma, Akane and Shampoo try setting them up on a date. Preferring Shampoo, Happosai tries to gift her with a bracelet. Cologne recognizes Happosai as a man who, while traveling China decades earlier for his martial arts training, harassed numerous women in China and stole their jewelry; the bracelet is also her family heirloom that contains three love potions in its gems. They team up to get the bracelet back from Happosai, during which Ranma swallows one gem (which lasts momentarily) and briefly falls for Cologne. Shampoo steals the bracelet back, but tries to give one of the gems (which lasts a lifetime) to Ranma, accidentally giving it to Akane instead. Everyone begins fighting over Akane to either get her to look at them or avert her from falling for others. She ends up coughing up the gem, which gets eaten by an octopus that falls for Happosai.
28	4	"The Way of Tea"; Transliteration: "Kakuto sadou dosu" (Japanese: 格闘茶道どす)	Nana Ueda	Akane Takahashi	Hiroko Kazui	Yoshiko Saito	October 25, 2026
Female Ranma is kidnapped by an unconscious man named Sentaro. Akane tries to rescue Ranma, fails but goes after her. Ranma wakes up, finding out that Sentaro wants to marry her to get out of arranged marriage to someone named Sasuki. Using hot water that he boils, Ranma transform back to into male much to Sentaro's dismay. Akane arrives and demands Ranma's release, however Sentaro's grandmother informs them that Ranma would have to fight Sasuki using "Tea Ceremony Martial Arts". Overnight, Sentaro trains female Ranma in Tea Ceremony. The next day, Ranma and Akane arrive to the arranged match to find a monkey in Sasuki's place. Ranma and the monkey then engage in extreme Tea Ceremony combat. During the fight, Sentaro is knocked flying and he crashes into the real Sasuki who felt guilty arranging Sanae; her pet monkey, into the fight. Sentaro locks eyes with Sasuki who agrees to marry him. The episode ends with Ranma and Akane receiving a letter from Sentaro and Sasuki saying they are happily married but then arrive in person to surprise them in the Tendo Dojo.
29	5	"The Way the Cookie Crumbles"; Transliteration: "Monogoto wa naru yō ni naru" (Japanese: 黒バラクッキー)	Taro Kubo	Misaki Morie	Hiroko Kazui	Haruki Miura	November 1, 2026
30	6	"I'm Going to Eat It All!"; Transliteration: "Zenbu tabechauzo!" (Japanese: 全部食っちゃうぞ)	Masatoyo Takada	Misaki Morie	Masatoyo Takada	Midori Nakamura	November 8, 2026
31	7	"Quest for the Hidden Spring"; Transliteration: "Mezase, Wafū Otoko ni Izumi" (Japanese: めざせ、和風男溺泉)	Yasuhiro Geshi	Akane Takahashi	Parako Shinohara & Masahiro Aizawa	Daisuke Niinuma	November 14, 2026
Ryoga and Ranma team up to find the "Japanese Spring of Drowned Man", a water supply that could cure their curses. The location is under the girls locker room at Funikan High School. They try various methods and disguises to try to get into the locker room but their cover gets blown. Meanwhile Happosai raids the girls locker room and Akane tries to catch him but ends up catching Ranma instead. She believes that Ranma is helping Happosai but Ranma reveals his true intention. At the end, Ryoga and Ranma burst a water pipe under the locker room to find a note that the Spring was out of commission and that to use the original spring in China.
32	8	(Japanese: 突撃！紅つばさ)	Hiroko Kazui	Akane Takahashi	Hiroko Kazui	Kosuke Kawamura	November 22, 2026

== Reception ==
At the 9th Crunchyroll Anime Awards in 2025, Ranma ½ was nominated for 6 categories, including Best Comedy, Best Romance, and Best Ending Sequence ("Anta Nante" by Riria). The anime's second season was nominated in two categories for Best Comedy and Best Romance at the 10th edition in 2026.
