= Anta Nante =

2024 single by Riria.

Single by Riria.
- Released: October 13, 2024
- Genre: J-pop
- Length: 4:01
- Label: Toy's Factory
- Composer: Riria.
- Lyricist: Riria.

Music video
- "Anta Nante" on YouTube

"Anta Nante" (あんたなんて。) is a song by Japanese singer Riria, performed as the ending theme for the 2024 anime reboot of Ranma ½.

== Background ==
The song was announced on 31 August 2024. Riria. wrote the song to represent the frustrated relationship between the characters Ranma and Akane.

== Music video ==
A music video for the song was released on 19 October 2024.

== Personnel ==
Credits adapted from Apple Music.

Musicians

- Riria. – vocals

Technical

- Tsubasa Yamazaki – mastering engineer
- Maigo Hanyuu – arranger
- Riria. – lyrics, composer

== Reception ==
The song was ranked second on the Weekly USEN HIT J-POP Ranking, just below "One" by Snow Man. It was nominated for Best Ending Sequence at the 9th Crunchyroll Anime Awards in 2025.

== Charts ==
Weekly chart performance for "Anta Nante"
Chart (2024)	Peak position
Japan Combined Singles (Oricon)	28
