= Fumino (singer) =

Japanese singer (born 2006)

Fumino ふみの
- Born: August 22, 2006 (age 20); Tokyo, Japan
- Origin: Tokyo, Japan
- Occupations: Singer; songwriter
- Instruments: Vocals; guitar; harmonica
- Years active: 2023–present
- Labels: No Label Artists; EMI
- Website: fumino.b-rave.tokyo

Fumino (ふみの; born August 22, 2006) is a Japanese singer and songwriter. A contestant of Chanmina and Sky-Hi's girl group audition program No No Girls, she later signed to B-Rave, a talent agency division of BMSG. Fumino released her debut single "Favorite Song" in January 2026, under No Label Artists, a record label founded by Chanmina.

== History ==
=== 2023–2025: No No Girls ===
South Korean-Japanese rapper and singer Chanmina and Japanese rapper Sky-Hi announced an audition program, No No Girls, a survival style show to determine members of a girl group. The pair revealed Chanmina would produce the group while Sky-Hi's talent agency BMSG would manage the group. 30 initial candidates were selected out of 7,000 applicants. The first episode of No No Girls was broadcast via YouTube on October 4, 2024. On December 20, 2024, Fumino was one of the ten finalists. Following the final audition on January 11, 2025, Fumino was eliminated from the program. The seven finalists, Chika, Naoko, Jisoo, Yuri, Momoka, Koharu, and Mahina, formed the girl group Hana.

=== 2026–present: Solo debut, first album ===
On January 4, 2026, No Label Music announced the launch of No Label Artists, an independent record label housing self-produced artists. The label begun teasing the signing of its first artist under No Label Artists on social media. On January 8, No Label Artists announced their first signed artist, Fumino. Her debut single, "Favorite Song", was announced for release on January 11, 2026, exactly one year after the final audition of No No Girls. She later performed the song live on Count Down TV, her first full-length television appearance. In March, Fumino released her second single, "Hotline". Music journalists noted Fumino wrote both the lyrics and music entirely herself, while also playing the harmonica and guitar on the song. Her third single "Yoku Aru Hanashi" served as the theme song for TV Asahi's drama series Women Document Detectives. In July, Fumino released her fourth single, "Tokyo", serving as the image song for Fuji TV's Tokyo Middle 30.

Near the end of July, Fumino announced her debut studio album, Because You Know Me as If You Know Everything About Me. The album was released digitally on September 14, 2026.

== Discography ==
=== Albums ===
List of studio albums, with selected chart positions
Title	Album details	Peak chart positions
Title	Album details	JPN DL
Because You Know Me as If You Know Everything About Me	Release: September 14, 2026; Label: No Label Artists, EMI; Format: Digital download, streaming	20

=== Singles ===
List of singles, showing year released, selected chart positions, and album name
Title	Year	Peak chart positions		Album
Title	Year	JPN Comb.	JPN Hot	Album
"Favorite Song"	2026	36	9	Because You Know Me as If You Know Everything About Me
"Hotline" (ホットライン)	2026	—	— (Note: "Hotline" did not enter the Billboard Japan Hot 100 chart, but peaked at number 73 on the Billboard Japan Download Songs chart.)	Because You Know Me as If You Know Everything About Me
"Yoku Aru Hanashi" (よくあるはなし)	2026	—	— (Note: "Yoku Aru Hanashi" did not enter the Billboard Japan Hot 100 chart, but peaked at number 35 on the Billboard Japan Download Songs chart.)	Because You Know Me as If You Know Everything About Me
"Tokyo" (東京)	2026	—	— (Note: "Tokyo" did not enter the Billboard Japan Hot 100 chart, but peaked at number 88 on the Billboard Japan Download Songs chart.)	Because You Know Me as If You Know Everything About Me
"Sunaomiman" (素直未満)	2026	—	—	Non-album single
"—" denotes items that did not chart.
