= Rose (Hana song) =

2025 single by Hana

Single by Hana

from the album Hana
- Language: Japanese
- B-side: "Drop"; "Tiger"
- Released: April 23, 2025
- Recorded: 2025
- Length: 2:45
- Label: No Label; Mastersix Foundation
- Songwriters: Mina Otomonai; Sofia Quinn; Adam Kapit
- Producers: Aka-p; Chanmina

Hana singles chronology
"Drop" (2025)	"Rose" (2025)	"Burning Flower" (2025)

Music video
- "Rose" on YouTube

"Rose" is the major label debut single recorded by Japanese girl group Hana, released on April 23, 2025, via No Label Music and Mastersix Foundation. It was originally released digitally on April 2, 2025, as a promotional single. The maxi-single release includes "Drop", Hana's pre-debut single, alongside "Tiger", both serving as B-sides.

== Background ==
Hana is a girl group formed following the audition program No No Girls, which was launched by Chanmina serving as their executive producer while being managed under Sky-Hi's BMSG talent agency. Auditions for a girl group produced by Chanmina was announced on November 4, 2023. Applications later closed on January 31, 2024. On October 4, the first episode was released via YouTube, with 30 candidates selected out of 7,000 that applied. The final round of the audition was held on January 12, 2025. The seven finalists were Chika, Naoko, Jisoo, Yuri, Momoka, Koharu, and Mahina. The seven finalists were selected to be members of the girl group called Hana. The group released their pre-debut single "Drop", which they originally performed during the final round of the audition. The single was later released digitally on January 31, 2025. The group later signed with Chanmina's No Label Music alongside Sony Music Japan's Mastersix Foundation label.

== Release ==
On April 2, 2025, Hana digitally released their major label debut single "Rose". On March 5, a physical release of "Rose" was announced. Three variants of the maxi single were revealed, a regular edition, limited edition type A and limited edition type B. All variants include two B-side tracks, "Drop" and "Tiger". The type A edition includes a bonus Blu-ray of the "Rose" music video and a live performance video while the type B edition's bonus Blu-ray consists of the "Rose" music video and a behind the scenes of the music video.

== Commercial performance ==
"Rose" debuted at number one on the Billboard Japan Hot 100 for the week of April 9, 2025, with 9,595 points. "Rose" received over 12,870 downloads, 8,781,850 streams, and ranked 17 on radio charts compiled by Nielsen and Billboard. The song also debuted at number one on the Billboard Japan Hot Shot Songs sub-chart. On the Oricon charts, "Rose" debuted at number two on the Digital Singles Chart and number one on the Streaming Chart.

Following its physical release, "Rose" debuted at number three on the Oricon Singles Chart.

== Track listing ==
- Digital download, streaming and CD
1. "Rose" – 2:45
2. "Drop" – 2:29
3. "Tiger" – 3:10
- Limited edition bonus Blu-ray type A
1. "Rose" (music video)
2. "Rose" (performance video)
- Limited edition bonus Blu-ray type B
1. "Rose" (music video)
2. "Rose" (behind the scenes)

== Charts ==
=== Weekly charts ===
Weekly chart performance for "Rose"
Chart (2025)	Peak position
Global 200 (Billboard)	111
Japan (Japan Hot 100)	1
Japan (Oricon)	3
Japan Combined Singles (Oricon)	2

=== Monthly charts ===
Monthly chart performance for "Rose"
Chart (2025)	Position
Japan (Oricon)	8

=== Year-end charts ===
Year-end chart performance for "Rose"
Chart (2025)	Position
Japan (Japan Hot 100)	6
Japan (Oricon)	84
Japan Combined Singles (Oricon)	1

== Certifications ==
Certifications for "Rose"
Region	Certification	Certified units/sales
Streaming
Japan (RIAJ)	2× Platinum	200,000,000^{†}
^{†} Streaming-only figures based on certification alone.

== Release history ==
Release history and formats for "Rose"
Region	Date	Format(s)	Version	Label	Ref.
Various	April 2, 2025	Digital download; streaming	Promotional single	No Label; Mastersix Foundation	
Japan	April 23, 2025	Digital download; streaming	Maxi single	No Label; Mastersix Foundation	
Japan	April 23, 2025	Digital download; streaming; CD	Maxi single	No Label; Mastersix Foundation	
Japan	April 23, 2025	CD; Blu-ray	Limited maxi single type A	No Label; Mastersix Foundation	
Japan	April 23, 2025	CD; Blu-ray	Limited maxi single type B	No Label; Mastersix Foundation	
