= Hana (Hana album) =

2026 studio album by Hana

- Standard CD cover

Studio album by Hana
- Released: February 23, 2026
- Recorded: 2025
- Length: 34:48
- Language: Japanese; English
- Label: No Label; Mastersix Foundation
- Producer: Chanmina; Aka-p; Jigg; Ryosuke "Dr. R" Sakai; Gray

Singles from Hana
- 1. "Rose" Released: April 23, 2025; 2. "Burning Flower" Released: June 9, 2025; 3. "Blue Jeans" Released: July 16, 2025; 4. "Bad Love" Released: September 8, 2025; 5. "My Body" Released: October 13, 2025; 6. "Non Stop" Released: December 5, 2025; 7. "Cold Night" Released: January 28, 2026

Hana (stylized in all uppercase) is the debut studio album by Japanese girl group Hana, released digitally on February 23, 2026, and physically on February 25, 2026, via No Label Music and Mastersix Foundation. Announced in December 2025, the album was preceded by the release of seven singles, including their major label single "Rose" and "Cold Night", the image song for the second season of the Japanese animated series Medalist.

== Background ==
South Korean-Japanese rapper and singer Chanmina had an interest in executive producing a girl group. Approaching Japanese rapper Sky-Hi, she developed the concept of a survival show with him to determine members of a new girl group. In November 2023, the two announced auditions for No No Girls, a survival-style audition program that would be broadcast online via YouTube. Finalists would become members of a girl group under Chanmina's record label, No Label Music, while being managed by Sky-Hi's talent agency BMSG. Out of 7,000 applicants, 30 were selected.

The first episode of No No Girls premiered on October 4, 2024. The final round of the audition was held on January 12, 2025, with seven finalists remaining. The seven finalists, Chika, Naoko, Jisoo, Yuri, Momoka, Koharu, and Mahina were selected to be members of a girl group called Hana. After releasing their pre-debut single "Drop", the group signed with No Label Music following its relaunch under Sony Music Labels.

== Release ==
Hana was released digitally on February 23, 2026, and in physical format on February 25. Two physical variants of the album will be released: a regular and limited edition. Both editions have 11 tracks, including a bonus track remix of "Tiger". The limited edition variant includes a bonus Blu-ray disc, containing various behind the scenes and recording session footage. The limited edition variant also includes a 40-page photo book, catchphrase stickers of each member, and large postcards.

First press editions of the album will include a set of 8 trading cards and a postcard.

== Track listing ==
Hana track listing
No.	Title	Writer(s)	Producer(s)	Length
1.	"Drop"	Mina Otomonai; Jigg	Jigg; Chanmina	2:29
2.	"Rose"	Otomonai; Sofia Quinn; Adam Kapit	Aka-p; Chanmina	2:46
3.	"Burning Flower"	Otomonai; Kapit	Aka-p; Chanmina	2:58
4.	"Blue Jeans"	Otomonai; Ryosuke Sakai	Sakai; Chanmina	3:27
5.	"Bad Love"	Otomonai; Kapit; Fiction	Aka-p; Chanmina	3:05
6.	"My Body"	Otomonai; Lee Seong-hwa; Momoka Takabatake	Gray; Chanmina	3:24
7.	"Non Stop"	Otomonai; Jigg; Ricky Ricky	Jigg; Chanmina	2:55
8.	"Cold Night"	Otomonai; Sangwoo	Jigg; Chanmina	3:13
9.	"Bloom"	Otomonai; Matt Cab	Cab; Chanmina	3:25
10.	"All In"	Chika; Jisoo; Mahina; Momoka; Naoko; Yuri; Koharu	Sunny; Ilica; Nonomi	2:32

Hana – bonus track
No.	Title	Writer(s)	Length
11.	"Tiger" (with Honeys version)	Otomonai; Jasmine Crowe; Sakai	4:34
Total length:			34:48

Hana – limited edition bonus Blu-ray
No.	Title	Length
1.	"1st Album Hana Jacket Shoot" (behind the scenes)
2.	"Bad Love" (Recording) (behind the scenes)
3.	"Bad Love" (music video) (behind the scenes)
4.	"My Body" (photo shoot) (behind the scenes)
5.	"My Body" (music video) (behind the scenes)
6.	"Non Stop" (photo shoot) (behind the scenes)
7.	"Non Stop" (music video) (behind the scenes)

== Charts ==
=== Weekly charts ===
Weekly chart performance for Hana
Chart (2026)	Peak position
Japanese Albums (Oricon)	2
Japanese Combined Albums (Oricon)	2
Japanese Hot Albums (Billboard Japan)	1

=== Monthly charts ===
Monthly chart performance for Hana
Chart (2026)	Position
Japanese Albums (Oricon)	3

== Certifications ==
Certifications for Hana
Region	Certification	Certified units/sales
Japan (RIAJ)	Gold	100,000^{^}
^{^} Shipments figures based on certification alone.

== Release history ==
Release history and formats for Hana
Region	Date	Format(s)	Version	Label	Ref.
Various	February 23, 2026	Digital download; streaming	Standard	No Label; Mastersix Foundation	
Japan	February 25, 2026	CD	Standard	No Label; Mastersix Foundation	
Japan	February 25, 2026	CD; Blu-ray	Limited	No Label; Mastersix Foundation	
