= List of Delicious in Dungeon characters =

The Japanese manga series Delicious in Dungeon features an extensive cast of characters created by Ryoko Kui.

== Laios' party ==
The initial members of the Touden Party (from left to right: Senshi, Marcille, Chilchuck, and Laios) as seen in the anime adaptation

Laios Touden (ライオス・トーデン, Raiosu Tōden)
Voiced by: Kentarō Kumagai, Natsu Yorita^{Ep. 3 credits} (young) (Japanese); Damien Haas, Marin Miller^{Ep. 3 credits} (young), Erica Mendez^{Ep. 11 credits} (young) (English)
A "tallman" (トールマン, tōruman), or human, who, along with his party, ventures into a dungeon to rescue his sister Falin before the dragon that defeated them digests her. He is a strong fighter and the leader of the party, and is calm and gentle. However, he tends to speak quickly when excited and can be tactless. He is excited to try different monster meals, and often uses the knowledge gained from cooking monsters to develop techniques to defeat them.
Kensuke (ケン助)
A mollusk-like creature from the "living armor" monsters that takes the shape of a sword, which Laios adopts to replace his original sword. It fidgets when it senses monsters, but also occasionally runs away when extremely frightened and cannot be drawn from its scabbard when rattling too much. Its sensitivity makes it unreliable, but helpful when exploring the dungeon.
Marcille Donato (マルシル・ドナトー, Marushiru Donatō)
Voiced by: Sayaka Senbongi (Japanese); Emily Rudd (English)
A cautious half-elf magician and an original member of Laios's party, who wields a wooden staff and can use various forms of magic. She is usually hesitant and even sometimes unwilling to eat monsters. Because of her skill in magic, she can often perform complicated or high-power spells with little preparation, a skill which her companions often do not appreciate. Her field of expertise is the study of ancient magic and occult practices.
Chilchuck Tims (チルチャック・ティムズ, Chiruchakku Timuzu)
Voiced by: Asuna Tomari (Japanese); Casey Mongillo (English)
A "half-foot" (ハーフフット, hāfufutto), or halfling, locksmith and an original member of Laios's party. He has good dexterity and keen senses, which he uses to disable traps, locate hidden pathways, and pickpocket for the group. He often admonishes Laios for his tactless behavior and obsession with monsters, but deep down cares about his companions. He dislikes when others take over his job or take needless risks and generally avoids combat, but can use a bow and arrow.
Senshi (センシ)
Voiced by: Hiroshi Naka, Kenta Okuma^{Ep. 22 credits} (young) (Japanese); SungWon Cho (English)
A 112-year-old dwarf warrior who joins the party to fulfill his dream of cooking the dragon Laios, whom he and his party set out to kill. He is knowledgeable about the dungeon and the monsters within it, and is an expert chef. He typically wields a large axe, but always carries a pot and cooking utensils. He ensures the party is well fed and have a balanced diet to keep them going through the dungeon.
Izutsumi (イヅツミ)
Voiced by: Mitsuho Kambe (Japanese); Laura Stahl^{Ep. 18 credits} (English)
A young tallman catgirl who was kidnapped and turned into a beast-man when she was six years old. She shares her form with the essence of a great cat, a monster resembling a large cat. After Shuro's father bought her, she traveled with his party under the alias of Asebi (アセビ) until she meets Laios's party, after which she joins them to find a cure for her body. She is independent and apathetic, but will protect her companions when needed.
Falin Touden (ファリン・トーデン, Farin Tōden)
Voiced by: Saori Hayami (Japanese); Lisa Reimold (English)
A tallman spellcaster and Laios's younger sister; a gentle person who shares her brother's love of monsters and was an original member of his party. She was eaten by a dragon at the bottom of the dungeon after using her magic to teleport the party to safety. Laios and his party set out to rescue and revive her before the dragon's month-long digestion cycle ends and she can no longer be resurrected. She has the unique ability to communicate with ghosts, which she used to protect the party and remove ghosts possessing corpses. As a Chimera, her feathered upper body was fused with the red dragon's lower body, accompanied by two white wings.

== Kabru's party ==
Kabru (カブルー, Kaburū)
Voiced by: Wataru Katoh (Japanese); Cedric Williams, Rebeka Thomas^{Ep. 17 credits} (young) (English)
A tallman fighter who leads a separate party to explore the island's dungeon. He is interested in people, but dislikes monsters due to past trauma involving a different dungeon. Despite wanting to reach the bottom of the dungeon and solve its mysteries, his party is bad at dealing with monsters and has been wiped out several times. He hates fighting monsters and monster food, but he is a skilled fighter against other humans. He is talented at reading people and understanding situations with little information.
Rinsha Fana (リンシャ・ファナ, Rinsha Fana)
Voiced by: Rie Takahashi (Japanese); Jenny Yokobori^{Ep. 5 credits} (English)
A blunt and pessimistic tallman magician who specializes in lightning magic and can recognize traces of magic left behind by other magicians.
Mickbell Tomas (ミックベル・トーマス, Mikkuberu Tōmasu)
Voiced by: Miyu Tomita (Japanese); Lisa Reimold^{Ep. 5 credits} (English)
A half-foot who dreams to save money to be able to afford his own house to live with Kuro.
Kuro (クロ)
Voiced by: Tōru Nara (Japanese); Keith Silverstein^{Ep. 5 credits} (English)
A kobold warrior who is under the employment of Mickbell and uses his sense of smell to track and identify people.
Holm (ホルム, Horumu)
Voiced by: Yūya Hirose (Japanese); Marin Miller^{Ep. 7 credits} (English)
A laid-back gnome spellcaster who specializes in healing magic, especially resurrections.
Daya (ダイア, Daia)
Voiced by: Kei Kawamura (Japanese); Rebeka Thomas (English)
A dwarf warrior. Her primary weapon is an axe.

== Tansu party ==
Tansu Floke (タンス・フロッカ, Tansu Furokka) and Yarn Floke (ヤーン・フロッカ, Yān Furokka)
Voiced by: Kazuhiko Inoue and Hitomi Shogawa (Japanese); Corey Burton^{Ep. 8 credits} and Barbara Goodson^{Ep. 9 credits} (English)
A pair of gnome researchers who are Namari's current employers. The couple adopted a pair of tallman children named Kaka and Kiki.
Kaka (カカ) and Kiki (キキ)
Voiced by: Ryōsuke Takahashi and Ikumi Hasegawa (Japanese); Jalen K. Cassell and Anairis Quiñones^{Ep. 9 credits} (English)
Tallman twins who were adopted by the Tansu party and act as their muscle.
Namari (ナマリ)
Voiced by: Akira Miki (Japanese); Marin Miller (English)
A brash dwarf fighter and an original member of Laios's party, who has since departed to work with the Tansu party. She is an expert in weapons and knowledgeable on types of metal and weapons.

== Shuro's party ==
Shuro (シュロー, Shurō) / Toshiro Nakamoto (半本 俊朗, Nakamoto Toshirō)
Voiced by: Shinji Kawada (Japanese); Mick Lauer (English)
A tallman fighter from a distant island who is part of a noble family and was an original member of Laios's party. He decided to explore the dungeon to improve his skill, and fell in love with Falin after watching her observe a caterpillar. After Falin's death and being warped to the surface, he returns to the dungeon with several retainers, including Izutsumi, to rescue her. He is reserved and often a victim of Laios's lack of social awareness.
Maizuru (マイズル)
Voiced by: Yoko Hikasa (Japanese); Jennifer Sun Bell^{Ep. 14 credits} (English)
A tallman magician who is one of Shuro's retainers, performs healing magic, and works as the party's chef. She also serves the primary guardian to Shuro, raising and educating him.
Hien (ヒエン)
Voiced by: Arisa Shida (Japanese); Jenny Yokobori^{Ep. 14 credits} (English)
A tallman warrior who is one of Shuro's retainers. She is professional and highly self-assured, shaped by a lifetime of ninja training. Her true name is Naka (ナカ).
Benichidori (ベニチドリ)
Voiced by: Akari Kitō (Japanese); Risa Mei^{Ep. 14 credits} (English)
A tallman warrior who is one of Shuro's retainers. Her real name is Matsu.
Inutade (イヌタデ)
Voiced by: Yoshino Furuya (Japanese); Xanthe Huynh^{Ep. 14 credits} (English)
A towering ogre who is one of Shuro's retainers and uses her strength as a warrior to deal with enemies. She had a close bond with Izutsumi before Izutsumi separated from the party.

== The Canaries ==
Mithrun (ミスルン, Misurun)
Voiced by: Koki Uchiyama (Japanese); Khoi Dao^{Ep. 21 credits} (English)
The calm and calculating captain of his squad of Canaries. He specializes in teleportation magic. The tips of both his ears are clipped off.
Cithis (シスヒス, Shisuhisu)
Voiced by: Hana Takeda (Japanese); Rebeka Thomas^{Ep. 21 credits} (English)
A member of Mithrun's squad of Canaries who acts as his second-in-command and is smug and blunt towards others, with Mithrun being the exception. She specializes in illusory magic.
Pattadol (パッタドル, Pattadoru)
Voiced by: Mariya Ise (Japanese); Jennifer Sun Bell^{Ep. 21 credits} (English)
A member of Mithrun's squad of Canaries who is observant and has a tendency to panic. She has a familiar that doubles as a staff which can cast spells, and she specializes in healing magic.
Fleki (フレキ, Fureki)
Voiced by: Yū Sasahara (Japanese); Xanthe Huynh^{Ep. 21 credits} (English)
An energetic elf who is member of Mithrun's squad of Canaries. She specializes in summoning magic, specifically in summoning bird-like familiars. She was convicted of possessing and selling ancient magical items and was sentenced to 240 years in prison.
Lycion (リシオン, Rishion)
Voiced by: Daisuke Kishio (Japanese); Lucien Dodge^{Ep. 21 credits} (English)
A member of Mithrun's squad of Canaries who is aloof. He is able to transform into a beast-man.
Otta (オッタ)
Voiced by: Kokoro Kikuchi (Japanese); Jenny Yokobori^{Ep. 21 credits} (English)
A female elf who is a member of Mithrun's squad of Canaries who is laid-back. She specializes in earth magic. Otta shows affection for half-foots and short lived races in general.

== Others ==
Sissel (Note: Sissel is referred to as Thistle in the anime adaptation.) (シスル, Shisuru)
Voiced by: Yū Kobayashi (Japanese); Rebeka Thomas (English)
An elf whom Laios first encountered inside the living pictures. He appeared again before Laios' party after they defeated the red dragon that digested Falin. It is later revealed that he is the Lunatic Magician (Note: In the anime adaptation, he is referred to as "the Mad Mage".) who controls the dungeon the story is set in.
Yaad (ヤアド, Yaado)
Voiced by: Ayumu Murase (Japanese); Jeannie Tirado^{Ep. 21 credits} (English)
The current lord of the Golden Country, who is the grandson of Delgal and son of Eodio. Yaad views the Winged Lion as the guardian spirit of his country.
