= List of Kaiju No. 8 characters =

A selection of the characters from the series; from the front left: Reno Ichikawa, Kafka Hibino (center), and Iharu Furuhashi; from the back left to right: Haruichi Izumo, Kikoru Shinomiya, Aoi Kaguragi, Soshiro Hoshina, and Mina Ashiro

The Japanese manga series Kaiju No. 8 features an extensive cast of characters created by Naoya Matsumoto.

== Main ==
=== Kafka Hibino / Kaiju No. 8 ===
Voiced by: Masaya Fukunishi, Megumi Han (young) (Japanese); Nazeeh Tarsha, Alexis Tipton (young) (English)

Kafka Hibino (日比野 カフカ, Hibino Kafuka) is a cleaner for a kaiju disposal company who once aspired to join the Defense Force. A small, parasitic creature (voiced by Tarako) merges with his body, granting him the ability to transform into a kaiju designated by the Defense Force as Kaiju No. 8 (怪獣8号, Kaijū 8-gō). This form possesses superhuman strength, regeneration, and the ability to detect other kaiju, while its unique power can disrupt the regeneration of its targets. After sacrificing his heart to stop the rampage of the powerful Meireki kaiju, Kafka is restored by Isao Shinomiya's spirit. The spirit replaces Kafka's heart, restoring his humanity while allowing him to retain his transformative ability.

=== Reno Ichikawa ===
Voiced by: Wataru Katoh (Japanese); Adam McArthur (English)

Reno Ichikawa (市川 レノ, Ichikawa Reno) is an 18-year-old man who starts working in the same company as Kafka with plans to join the Defense Force. He becomes friends with Kafka and helps him hide the secret of his kaiju form. Reno is considered to be a promising recruit and quickly becomes one of the Defense Force's strongest assets and joints the Fourth Division after the destruction of the Third Division's base. He is compatible with the Numbers 6 weapon made from the remains of Kaiju No. 6 that has a fortitude level of 9.6 and that devastated the Defense Force prior to the events of the series. The Numbers 6 weapon takes the form of a suit of armor that increases Reno's strength and speed and gives him the ability of cryokinesis.

=== Kikoru Shinomiya ===
Voiced by: Fairouz Ai (Japanese); Abigail Blythe (English)

Kikoru Shinomiya (四ノ宮 キコル, Shinomiya Kikoru) is a young woman who joins the Third Division together with Kafka and Reno. A kaiju-slaying prodigy, Kikoru is one of the greatest talents in the Defense Force and has the highest recorded unleashed combat power as a recruit. Her father, Isao, is the Director General of the Defense Force while her mother, Hikari, was a captain who died in the line of duty while fighting off a kaiju invasion led by Kaiju No. 6 prior to the events of the series. She uses a giant axe as her personal weapon and inherits her mother's Numbers 4 suit which gives her increased speed and the ability of flight.

== Defense Force ==
=== Executives ===
==== Isao Shinomiya ====
Voiced by: Tesshō Genda (Japanese); Christopher Wehkamp (English)

Isao Shinomiya (四ノ宮 功, Shinomiya Isao) is the Director General of the Defense Force and father to Kikoru Shinomiya. A historically powerful combatant, he wields the Numbers Weapon 2, a powered suit derived from Kaiju No. 2. Following his wife's death, his demeanor becomes stern, though he remains dedicated to preparing his daughter for combat. He spares Kafka Hibino after testing him and recognizing his humanity. Isao is killed and absorbed by Kaiju No. 9 during an attack on Tokyo. His consciousness persists within the kaiju, later manifesting to shatter its defenses, allowing for its defeat. His spirit subsequently appears to grant his heart to Kafka, saving his life and restoring his humanity.

==== Keiji Itami ====
Voiced by: Takayuki Sugō (Japanese); Jason Douglas (English)

Keiji Itami (伊丹 啓司, Itami Keiji) is the dutiful Deputy Director of the Defense Force who is later appointed as Director General of the Defense Force after Shinomiya's demise at No. 9's hands.

==== Juzo Nogizaka ====
Voiced by: Miou Tanaka (Japanese); Robert McCollum (English)

Juzo Nogizaka (乃木坂 十蔵, Nogizaka Juzo) is the stern Defense Force Eastern Command Chief of Staff, who has an eyepatch on his left eye.

=== First Division ===
==== Gen Narumi ====
Voiced by: Kōki Uchiyama (Japanese); Aaron Dismuke (English)

Gen Narumi (鳴海 弦, Narumi Gen) is the captain of the First Division of the Defense Force and its strongest active combatant of the Defense Force. Gen uses the Numbers 1 weapon made from the remains of Kaiju No. 1. The weapon takes the form of a powered suit of armor and a pair of retinal implants that give Gen the ability to predict enemy movements, allowing him to always land his attacks. His personal weapon is a large rifle with a bayonet. Gen is a main character of the spin-off series Kaiju No. 8: B-Side, which recounts his backstory in the Defense Force and his encounter with Isao Shinomiya.

==== Eiji Hasegawa ====
Voiced by: Hiroki Yasumoto (Japanese); Marcus Stimac (English)

Eiji Hasegawa (長谷川 エイジ, Hasegawa Eiji) is the disciplined, no-nonsense vice-captain of the First Division, a seven-foot tall bald man with a scar on his left eye.

==== Rin Shinonome ====
Voiced by: Kana Hanazawa (Japanese); Emi Lo (English)

Rin Shinonome (東雲りん, Shinonome Rin) is a platoon leader in the First Division who highly respects Gen. She uses a minigun as her weapon of choice.

==== Akira Kurusu ====
Voiced by: Ryōta Suzuki (Japanese); Brandon Acosta (English)

Akira Kurusu (来栖 アキラ, Kurusu Akira) is the dutiful Operations Leader of the First Division in the Defense Force, who used to be Director Isao Shinomiya's personal aid in battle.

=== Second Division ===
==== Jura Igarashi ====
Voiced by: Yūko Kaida (Japanese); Caitlin Glass (English)

Jura Igarashi (五十嵐 ジュラ, Igarashi Jura) is the Captain of the Second Division of the Defense Force. She is also Hakua Igarashi's older sister.

==== Hikari Shinomiya ====
Voiced by: Kotono Mitsuishi (Japanese); Morgan Garrett (English)

Hikari Shinomiya (四ノ宮 功, Shinomiya Hikari) was the former captain of the Second Division of the Defense Force, said to be one of the strongest members of the force, who lost her life in battle against Kaiju No. 6, though not before defeating it. She was also the wife of Isao Shinomiya and the mother of Kikoru Shinomiya.

=== Third Division ===
==== Mina Ashiro ====
Voiced by: Asami Seto (Japanese); Katelyn Barr (English)

Mina Ashiro (亜白 ミナ, Ashiro Mina) is the 27-year-old captain of the Third Division of the Defense Force. She is Kafka's childhood friend with whom he vowed to fight against kaiju. She is one of the strongest officers in the Defense Force and is highly skilled in using firearms due to a unique ability making her shots more devastating compared to other captains. Her personal weapon is a handheld cannon, making her effective against giant-sized kaiju.

==== Soshiro Hoshina ====
Voiced by: Kengo Kawanishi (Japanese); Landon McDonald (English)

Soshiro Hoshina (保科 宗四郎, Hoshina Soshirō) is the vice-captain of the Third Division. He is a skilled swordsman who is good at fighting smaller kaiju. Soshiro is frequently advised by his superiors to quit being a field officer due to his ineffectiveness with firearms. Mina, however, values his skill as a swordsman and asks him to become her vice-captain. On Soshiro's recommendation, Kafka is retrained as a cadet in the Third Division. Secretly, Soshiro suspects that Kafka is hiding something since the Third Division registered a 9.8 fortitude level at the same time that Kafka's suit stopped working when he transformed during the aptitude test to save Kikoru from a honju. In the battle against Kaiju No. 10 Soshiro stalls the fight long enough for Mina to incapacitate it after which it is turned into a Numbers weapon that is compatible with Soshiro. This weapon takes the form of a sentient suit with a tail that can be used for attacks.

==== Iharu Furuhashi ====
Voiced by: Yuuki Shin (Japanese); Ben Stegmair (English)

Iharu Furuhashi (古橋 伊春, Furuhashi Iharu) is a new recruit who joins the Third Division together with Kafka, Reno and Kikoru. He and Reno become part of the same platoon and develop a rivalry over the course of their training.

==== Haruichi Izumo ====
Voiced by: Keisuke Koumoto (Japanese); Howard Wang (English)

Haruichi Izumo (出雲 ハルイチ, Izumo Haruichi) is a new recruit of the Third Division, Haruichi is the scion of the Izumo family who run the Izumo Tech corporation that develops equipment for the Defense Force.

==== Aoi Kaguragi ====
Voiced by: Shunsuke Takeuchi (Japanese); Jonah Scott (English)

Aoi Kaguragi (神楽木 葵, Kaguragi Aoi) is a JGSDF officer who joins the Third Division and becomes part of the same platoon as Haruichi.

==== Konomi Okonogi ====
Voiced by: Sayaka Senbongi (Japanese); Celeste Perez (English)

Konomi Okonogi (小此木 このみ, Okonogi Konomi) is the lead operator of the Third Division who provides information to field officers. Her operations team monitors the suit power output of officers and can also remove their limiters allowing the officers to use greater outputs.

==== Akari Minase ====
Voiced by: Nene Hieda (Japanese); Monica Flatley (English)

Akari Minase (水無瀬あかり, Minase Akari) is a Defense Force officer of the Third Division.

==== Hakua Igarashi ====
Voiced by: Mayuko Kazama (Japanese); Molly Searcy (English)

Hakua Igarashi (五十嵐ハクア, Igarashi Hakua) is a tall Defense Force officer with blue hair in the Third Division. She is also Jura Igarashi's younger sister.

==== Tae Nakanoshima ====
Voiced by: Mutsumi Tamura (Japanese); Ezra Vervin (English)

Tae Nakanoshima (中之島 タエ, Nakanoshima Tae) is a platoon leader in the Third Division of the Defense Force, who is into younger guys. Haruichi and Aoi are part of her platoon.

==== Ryō Ikaruga ====
Voiced by: Makoto Furukawa (Japanese); Zac Loera (English)

Ryō Ikaruga (斑鳩亮, Ikaruga Ryō) is a platoon leader of the Third Division. Reno and Iharu are part of his platoon.

=== Fourth Division ===
==== Jūgo Ogata ====
Voiced by: Shunsuke Sakuya (Japanese); Ian Sinclair (English)

Jūgo Ogata (緒方ジュウゴ, Ogata Jūgo) is the captain of the Fourth Division of the Defense Force. He trains Reno and Iharu when they join the Fourth Division after the destruction of the Third Division's base and oversees Reno's training with the Numbers 6 weapon.

==== Toko Kirimori ====
Voiced by: M.A.O. (Japanese); Marisa Duran (English)

Toko Kirimori (霧森トーコ, Kirimori Tōko) is the diligent vice-captain of the Fourth Division.

=== Sixth Division ===
==== Sōichirō Hoshina ====
Voiced by: Kazuyuki Okitsu

Sōichirō Hoshina (保科 宗一郎, Hoshina Sōichirō) is the captain of the Sixth Division of the Defense Force. He is the older brother of Soshiro Hoshina (vice captain of the Third Division) and uses the single-blade style.

== Monster Sweeper Inc. ==
=== Mizoguchi ===
Voiced by: Mitsuru Miyamoto (Japanese); Derick Snow (English)

Mizoguchi (溝口) is a stern supervisor at Monster Sweeper Inc., a company specializing in the disposal of kaiju remains. He is the former superior to Kafka.

=== Masahide Tokuda ===
Voiced by: Yutaka Aoyama (Japanese); Michael Stimac (English)

Masahide Tokuda (徳田 マサヒデ, Tokuda Masahide), often called Toku, is a colleague of Kafka at Monster Sweeper Inc. A loud but gentle and helpful single father, he is a close friend to Kafka.

=== Ichitaka Mitsuike ===
Voiced by: Jun Fukushima (Japanese); Matthew Elkins (English)

Ichitaka Mitsuike (三池 イチタカ, Mitsuike Ichitaka) is an efficient, plump, and cheery employee of Monster Sweeper Inc.

=== Hiroto Mori ===
Voiced by: Ivan Shibata (Japanese); Nasim Benelkour (English)

Hiroto Mori (森 ヒロト, Mori Hiroto) is a reserved and taciturn employee of Monster Sweeper Inc.

== Kaiju ==
=== Kaiju No. 9 ===
Voiced by: Hiroyuki Yoshino (Japanese); Alejandro Saab (English)

Kaiju No. 9 (怪獣9号, Kaijū 9-gō) is a humanoid kaiju capable of creating other kaiju and absorbing humans to assume their form and memories. It orchestrates numerous catastrophes against the Defense Force, initially operating under the human disguise of a cleaner named Takamichi Hotaka (voiced by Tomokazu Sugita). Its power increases significantly after absorbing Isao Shinomiya and his Numbers Weapon 2. Pursuing a world for kaiju to thrive, it is ultimately revealed to have absorbed a powerful daikaiju from the Meireki era. This entity subsequently takes control, rampaging until it is defeated by Kafka Hibino. After the battle, its remains are sealed away.

=== Kaiju No. 10 ===
Voiced by: Kenta Miyake (Japanese); Brent Mukai (English)

Kaiju No. 10 (怪獣10号, Kaijū Jū-gō) is a humanoid kaiju that leads an assault on the Defense Force's Third Division base using a group of wyvern-type kaiju. After its defeat and capture by Soshiro Hoshina and Mina Ashiro, it divulges that Kaiju No. 9 is its creator. It bargains its knowledge for transformation into a Numbers weapon for Hoshina's use, expressing no allegiance to its maker. As the first sentient kaiju converted into a weapon, it retains its consciousness and forges a bond with Hoshina over their shared combativeness, possessing a maximum fortitude level of 9.0.

=== Kaiju No. 11 ===
Voiced by: Toshihiko Seki

Kaiju No. 11 (怪獣11号, Kaijū Jūichi-gō) is a large, grey humanoid kaiju characterized by a whale-like head and a prominent shark-like dorsal fin. It possesses hydrokinetic abilities, allowing it to manipulate water. These powers enable it to counter the predictive combat capabilities of Narumi.

=== Kaiju No. 15 ===
Voiced by: Fairouz Ai^{Ep. 23 credits}

Kaiju No. 15 (怪獣15号, Kaijū Jūgo-gō) is a humanoid kaiju with a slender, feminine form. Its most distinctive characteristic is the array of large, exposed brains attached to its body, including three on its head and several encircling its waist. The creature can assume a human disguise that closely resembles Kikoru Shinomiya, though with distinguishing black hair, red eyes, and a black school uniform. In addition to standard daikaiju abilities, it possesses immense power, capable of firing devastating energy beams and utilizing telepathy.

=== The Daikaiju of the Meireki Era ===
The Daikaiju of the Meireki Era (明暦の大怪獣, Meireki no Daikaijū) is an ancient kaiju with the ability to assimilate others. Its rampage caused the Great Fire of Meireki, and the collective resentment of its slain victims formed a parasitic core that later granted Kafka Hibino his powers. After retreating underground, it merges with and empowers Kaiju No. 9. Following the destruction of No. 9's core, the Daikaiju seizes control of the body. It then manifests a powerful, multi-limbed form and attempts to resurrect every kaiju in Japan. The combined force of the Defense Force allows Kafka to destroy its core, ending its centuries-long threat.
