= List of Blue Lock characters =

The Japanese manga series Blue Lock features an extensive cast of characters created by Muneyuki Kaneshiro and Yusuke Nomura.

== Blue Lock players ==
=== Team Z players ===
==== Yoichi Isagi ====
Voiced by: Kazuki Ura (Japanese); Ricco Fajardo (English)
Portrayed by: Ryōhei Takenaka (stage play), Fumiya Takahashi (film)

Yoichi Isagi (潔 世一, Isagi Yoichi) is selected for the Blue Lock program despite his team's failure to qualify for high school nationals, personally chosen by Jinpachi Ego. Initially ranked among the weakest of 300 participants, he distinguishes himself through exceptional field vision and tactical analysis, creating scoring opportunities for Team Z. His emphasis on "chemical reactions" between teammates enhances collaborative playmaking. After overcoming early setbacks in the Second Selection, Isagi earns a starting position against Japan U-20, scoring the decisive goal following Rin's setup. His performance continues in the Neo-Egoist League as a Bastard München starter, where he ties Rin for the highest transfer bid.

==== Meguru Bachira ====
Voiced by: Tasuku Kaito (Japanese); Drew Breedlove (English)
Portrayed by: Nobunaga Satō (stage play), Kaito Sakurai (film)

Meguru Bachira (蜂楽 廻, Bachira Meguru) is a forward known for his exceptional dribbling skills, enabling him to maneuver past opponents with ease. Initially isolated due to his unconventional personality, he developed an imaginative approach to football, visualizing opponents as "monsters" to challenge himself. He forms an early friendship with Yoichi Isagi in Team Z, bonding through their shared passion for the sport. Characterized by his energetic demeanor and non-confrontational nature, Bachira occasionally struggles with social interactions off the field. During the Second Selection, he refines his technical abilities while adopting a more confident playing style. His consistent performance earns him a place in the Blue Lock lineup and one of the highest bids in the Neo-Egoist League while playing for FC Barcha.

==== Rensuke Kunigami ====
Voiced by: Yūki Ono (Japanese); Alex Hom (English)
Portrayed by: Shōta Matsuda (stage play), Kouta Nomura (film)

Rensuke Kunigami (國神 錬介, Kunigami Rensuke) is a self-described "football superhero" with strong morals regarding football, he emphasizes fair play on field whilst maintaining tact with his striking power. He also maintained a calm and kind personality towards others off-pitch and was generally seen as an older brother figure to his teammates. Despite being initially eliminated in the Second Selection following a loss to Shidou and Igaguri, he would return via the Wild Card program with a significantly more introverted and serious attitude towards his teammates and football in his newfound efforts of becoming the best striker in the world. He currently plays for Bastard München in the Neo-Egoist League as a starter.

==== Hyōma Chigiri ====
Voiced by: Sōma Saitō (Japanese); Aaron Dismuke (English)
Portrayed by: Ryō Saeki (stage play), Kyohei Takahashi (film)

Hyōma Chigiri (千切 豹馬, Chigiri Hyōma) is an attacking player known for his explosive acceleration and technical dribbling skills. Nicknamed "Princess" for his distinctive red hair and meticulous appearance, he initially displayed an aloof demeanor stemming from a past ACL injury that threatened his career. After recovering, he played cautiously until overcoming his fears during Team Z's match against Team W. This breakthrough restored his confidence and signature speed-based playing style. Chigiri progressed through subsequent selections, earning a spot in the Japan U-20 exhibition match before joining Manshine City in the Neo-Egoist League as a starting forward.

==== Wataru Kuon ====
Voiced by: Masatomo Nakazawa (Japanese); Mark Allen Jr. (English)
Portrayed by: Jin Saori (stage play), Shunya Asano (film)

Wataru Kuon (久遠 渉, Kuon Wataru) is a dedicated forward whose technical skills and leadership initially made him Team Z's defensive anchor and tactical organizer. His strict professionalism contrasted with teammates' more casual attitudes, earning him a reputation as overly serious. During the First Selection, his controversial decision to betray Team Z in their match against Team W—though strategically motivated—damaged his standing among peers. Despite efforts to redeem himself in the Second Selection by forming a new trio with Imamura and Iemon, Kuon failed to progress further in the program. His elimination underscored the Blue Lock project's emphasis on evolving beyond conventional play styles.

==== Jingo Raichi ====
Voiced by: Yoshitsugu Matsuoka (Japanese); Aaron Campbell (English)
Portrayed by: Takamichi Satō (stage play), Raizo Ishikawa (film)

Jingo Raichi (雷市 陣吾, Raichi Jingo) is known for his highly aggressive personality on and off field and his shark-like teeth. He was often seen as an intimidating player who primarily shouts and frequently engaging in arguments at both his teammates and his opponents. Over time, he would be more accepting of cooperating with his teammates as well as be a source of inspiration for his teammates to persevere in the direst moments with his high stamina. During the Second Selection, he would team up with Gagamaru and Junichi Wanima as all three would later make the cut for the third selection. He currently plays for Bastard München after appearing as a substitute for the match against Japan U-20.

==== Yūdai Imamura ====
Voiced by: Shōya Chiba (Japanese); Jesse Pinnick (English)
Portrayed by: Yuki Sakurai (film)

Joining the Blue Lock program, Yūdai Imamura (今村 遊大, Imamura Yūdai) was primarily defined by his desire to pick-up girls through his self-described abilities of speed and technique. Despite this, he never gained many opportunities to show off his skills as he would later be eliminated in the Second Selection alongside Kuon and Iemon as his teammates.

==== Gin Gagamaru ====
Voiced by: Shūgo Nakamura (Japanese); Lee George (English)
Portrayed by: Kōki Muramatsu (stage play), Yuki Tachibana (film)

Gin Gagamaru (我牙丸 吟, Gagamaru Gin) is a tall and physically gifted player, Gagamaru is known for his ability to use himself as a spring to cover long distances with this method being often used to score goals for his team. After passing the Second Selection alongside Raichi and Junichi Wanima, he was selected to play as a goalkeeper for both the Blue Lock XI in the Japan U-20 match as well as for Bastard München during the Neo-Egoist league, utilizing his bodily capabilities to make many normally impossible saves.

==== Asahi Naruhaya ====
Voiced by: Daishi Kajita (Japanese); Spencer Liles (English)
Portrayed by: Sho Nishigaki (film)

Hailing from a family in poverty following the premature deaths of his parents, Asahi Naruhaya (成早 朝日, Naruhaya Asahi) aspired to become a professional football player to earn a significant amount of money to help out his sister in attaining funds. Despite his efforts and his quick footwork, he would ultimately be eliminated from the Second Selection following a defeat to Isagi and Nagi as they would choose his teammate Barō over him.

==== Okuhito Iemon ====
Voiced by: Ryūnosuke Watanuki (Japanese); Anthony DiMascio (English)
Portrayed by: Takuro Sawada (stage play), Joey Iwanaga (film)

Despite playing as a forward alongside the rest of the participants of the Blue Lock program, Okuhito Iemon (伊右衛門 送人, Iemon Okuhito) was selected to play as the goalkeeper of Team Z. He would later be eliminated in the Second Selection alongside his teammates Kuon and Imamura.

==== Gurimu Igarashi ====
Voiced by: Aoi Ichikawa (Japanese); Kyle Igneczi (English)
Portrayed by: Yuki Kakikawa (stage play), Yuzu Aoki (film)

Gurimu Igarashi (五十嵐 栗夢, Igarashi Gurimu), Nicknamed and more commonly known as Igaguri (毬栗), he descends from a family of monks and is set to inherit the temple from his father. His desire to evade life as a monk serves as his sole motivation to play professional football as he is infamously the lowest rank player in the entirety of the Blue Lock Program with his primary strength being through his perseverance and tendency to foul other players. During the Second Selection, he teams up with Shidou after narrowly avoiding elimination but has since only appeared as a reserve for the U-20 match as well as in the Neo-Egoist League where he plays for Bastard München. He was eliminated from Blue Lock due to not making the top 23.

==== Ryōsuke Kira ====
Voiced by: Kenichi Suzumura (Japanese); Blake Shepard (English)
Portrayed by: Yuki Kura (film)

Part of the same team that had beat Isagi's team in the qualification for the high school nationals, Ryōsuke Kira (吉良 涼介, Kira Ryōsuke) was nicknamed the "Crown Jewel of Japan" due to his talents as he would later befriend Isagi after both were accepted into the Blue Lock program. He was a notable critic of Ego's philosophy on what made a good striker and chose to enter to prove him otherwise. He was one of the first players eliminated from Blue Lock after an unexpected kick from Bachira and Isagi despite initially being the highest ranked player amongst the twelve players of Team Z.

=== Other Blue Lock players introduced in the First Selection ===
==== Shōei Barō ====
Voiced by: Junichi Suwabe (Japanese); Matthew David Rudd (English)
Portrayed by: Yūki Izawa (stage play)

Known for his incredibly selfish and egotistical attitude, Shōei Barō (馬狼 照英, Barō Shōei) desires to be the center-stage and main star of the field, caring for only himself and showing little regard and respect towards others such as his persistent refusal to pass to his teammates. After being the sole survivor of Team X from the First Selection due to being the club's top scorer, he gained further motivation with this philosophy upon losing to Isagi and Nagi during the Second Selection, devoting his plays solely to become Isagi's "villain" fueled by his desire of revenge. Conversely, he is known to be devoted to cleaning and enforcing good conduct on public spaces off pitch. Following appearing as a substitute for Otoya in the U-20 match and scoring a goal, he played for Ubers as a starter and qualified for the U-20 World Cup.

==== Seishirō Nagi ====
Voiced by: Nobunaga Shimazaki (Japanese); Bryson Baugus (English)
Portrayed by: Ryōtarō Kosaka (stage play), K (film)

Seishirō Nagi (凪 誠士郎, Nagi Seishirō) is a naturally gifted forward recruited into competitive football by Reo Mikage, with whom he formed a dominant high school partnership. After entering the Blue Lock program, he led Team V to near-flawless victories until defeated by Team Z, igniting his rivalry with Yoichi Isagi. During subsequent selections, Nagi demonstrated elite technical ability, earning selection among Blue Lock's top six players and captaining Team C. He scored the opening goal for Blue Lock XI against Japan U-20. In the Neo Egoist League, his initial success with Manshine City was hampered by predictable play patterns with Reo. This tactical limitation ultimately led to him ranking in 24th place, being eliminated from the Blue Lock program.

==== Reo Mikage ====
Voiced by: Yūma Uchida (Japanese); Kamen Casey (English)
Portrayed by: Shūji Kikuchi (stage play), Keito Tsuna (film)

Reo Mikage (御影 玲王, Mikage Reo) initially had very little satisfaction in life due to everything simply being easily obtainable due to his parents' extraordinary wealth. This was until he sought to obtain the FIFA World Cup Trophy due to it having to actually be earned instead of simply given to him. Following him accidentally bumping into Nagi, Reo saw the potential in him through a miraculous catch of his phone with his foot as he later befriended him, dominating high school football through their team plays. This success would continue into the First Selection as the two played for Team V and won nearly every match. His time in the Second Selection with Chigiri and Kunigami would have Reo later develop his signature technique of precisely replicating opponents' abilities with near-perfect accuracy, achieving up to 99% fidelity during the U-20 exhibition game. Despite later relying on Nagi too much to the point of being vulnerable to easy predictions, Reo still qualified to play in the U-20 World Cup.

==== Zantetsu Tsurugi ====
Voiced by: Kazuyuki Okitsu (Japanese); Matthew Elkins (English)
Portrayed by: Takumi Masunaga (stage play), Kouhei Higuchi (film)

Zantetsu Tsurugi (剣城 斬鉄, Tsurugi Zantetsu) is a winger recognized for his explosive acceleration, compensating for limited tactical awareness. His remarkable speed stems from childhood habits of running rather than taking public transport. Though his technical abilities initially carried him through Team V's successes in the First Selection, his intellectual limitations became apparent during strategic plays. He is also characterized by his low intelligence, often using malapropisms to make him sound smarter. After temporary alliances in the Second Selection with Niko and Reiji Hiiragi, he joined Nagi's group following their elimination. His performance earned him progression to the third selection and later a starting position with Paris X Gen in the Neo-Egoist League. Despite his shortcomings, Zantetsu secured a spot in Japan's U-20 World Cup roster through sheer athletic prowess.

==== Ikki Niko ====
Voiced by: Natsuki Hanae (Japanese); David Matranga (English)
Portrayed by: Kōsei Tsubokura (stage play)

Ikki Niko (二子 一揮, Niko Ikki) is a Blue Lock contender who was determined to survive using his skills. However, after losing to Isagi in the First Selection, he decided to stop being afraid, change, and improve. He started as a centre-back for the Blue Lock Eleven against the Japan U-20 and as a defensive midfielder for the Ubers in the Neo Egoist League. After the fifth round of the Neo Egoist League ended, Niko was ranked 15th and qualified to become one of the 23 players on the new Japan U-20 team.

==== Junichi Wanima ====
Voiced by: Ryōta Suzuki (Japanese); Chris Guerrero (English)
Portrayed by: Masahide Funaki (stage play)

Junichi Wanima (鰐間 淳壱, Wanima Junichi) is the older twin brother of Keisuke Wanima. He was the only member of Team W to survive the First Selection, due to being their top scorer. Junichi would later team up with Raichi and Gagamaru during the 2nd selection. In the third selection, he chose to play for Manshine City in England. He was ultimately eliminated from Blue Lock due to not making the top 23.

==== Keisuke Wanima ====
Voiced by: Ryōta Suzuki (Japanese); Chris Guerrero (English)
Portrayed by: Masahiro Kawai (stage play)

Keisuke Wanima (鰐間 計助, Wanima Keisuke) is the younger twin brother of Junichi Wanima. When he first arrived at Blue Lock, he was on Team W, which was eliminated in the First Selection. After he was expelled, Keisuke was offered a chance to participate in the Side-B project in order to join Japan U-20 during the U-20 World Cup.

=== Blue Lock players introduced during the Second Selection ===
Rin Itoshi (糸師 凛, Itoshi Rin)
Voiced by: Kōki Uchiyama (Japanese); Matt Shipman (English)
Portrayed by: Kōhei Nagata (second stage play), Ryono Kusachi (third stage play onwards), Yūsei Yagi (film)
The number one ranked player in Blue Lock, and Sae Itoshi's brother, as well as Isagi's rival from the Second Selection onwards. His skills are very similar to Isagi's, although honed to a higher degree.
Jyūbei Aryū (蟻生 十兵衛, Aryū Jūbee)
Voiced by: Katsuyuki Konishi (Japanese); Bradley Gareth (English)
Portrayed by: Keisuke Watanabe (film)
Aoshi Tokimitsu (時光 青志, Tokimitsu Aoshi)
Voiced by: Shinnosuke Tachibana (Japanese); Jordan Dash Cruz (English)
Portrayed by: Omi Natsuki (film)
Ryūsei Shidou (士道龍聖, Shidō Ryūsei)
Voiced by: Yuichi Nakamura (Japanese); Van Barr Jr. (English)
A chaotic but talented player who idolizes Sae Itoshi but dislikes Rin. To appease Sae's demands for playing in the U-20 match, he also joins the U-20 squad and is the only player to score two goals, despite only coming in as a substitute in the second half.
Tabito Karasu (烏 旅人, Karasu Tabito)
Voiced by: Makoto Furukawa (Japanese); Clifford Chapin (English)
Eita Otoya (乙夜影汰, Otoya Eita)
Voiced by: Kengo Kawanishi (Japanese); Davon Oliver (English)
Kenyū Yukimiya (雪宮剣優, Yukimiya Kenyū)
Voiced by: Takuya Eguchi (Japanese); Jim Foronda (English)
Ranze Kurona (黒名 蘭世, Kurona Ranze)
Voiced by: Chiaki Kobayashi (Japanese); Adam Gibbs (English)
Yō Hiori (氷織 羊, Hiori Yō)
Voiced by: Eiji Mikami (Japanese); Justin Briner (English)
Nijirō Nanase (七星 虹郎, Nanase Nijirō)
Voiced by: Kakeru Hatano (Japanese); Travis Mullenix (English)

== Other players ==
=== Sae Itoshi ===
Voiced by: Takahiro Sakurai (Japanese); Alejandro Saab (English)

Sae Itoshi (糸師 冴, Itoshi Sae) is the highest ranked player in Japan's U-20 team, and Rin Itoshi's brother. Considered to be one of the World's 11, the best U-20 players in the world. Wanting to see how good the Blue Lock players were, he agreed to join Japan's U-20 squad for an exhibition match against Blue Lock, on the condition that Ryusei Shidou also joined the team.

=== Oliver Aiku ===
Voiced by: Satoshi Hino (Japanese); Jonah Scott (English)

Oliver Aiku (オリヴァ 愛空, Oriva Aiku) is the captain of the U-20 team.

=== Shūto Sendō ===
Voiced by: Akihisa Wakayama (Japanese); Joshua Waters (English)

Shūto Sendō (閃堂 秋人, Sendō Shūto) is a member of the Ubers team in the Neo Egoist League and of the Japan U-20 team. After the fifth round of the league ended, Sendo was ranked 17th and qualified as one of the 23 players for the new Japan U-20 team.

=== Michael Kaiser ===
Voiced by: Mamoru Miyano (Japanese); Christopher Wehkamp (English)

Michael Kaiser (ミヒャエル・カイザー, Mihyaeru Kaizā) is a German forward for Bastard München and member of the New Generation World XI. As Bastard München's core player, he becomes Yoichi Isagi's primary rival during the Neo Egoist League. Known for his clinical finishing, Kaiser compensates for lacking natural talent through adaptability, tactical intelligence and refined technique. His signature Kaiser Impact strike has three variations: Beinschuss (bicycle kick), Blitzkrieg (accelerated shot) and Magnus (curved shot). He also utilizes Predator Eye to identify optimal scoring positions. During the league's decisive match, Kaiser temporarily collaborates with Isagi, combining their adaptive play styles to create the winning opportunity. His performance secures a ¥320 million transfer offer from Spanish club Re Al.

=== Julian Loki ===
Voiced by: Hiro Shimono (Japanese); Kevin D. Thelwell (English)

Julian Loki (ジュリアン・ロキ, Jurian Roki) is a professional footballer and the youngest Master Striker, coaching France's national stratum while playing for Paris X Gen. At just 17, he competes at the highest level rather than in youth divisions. His extraordinary speed, known as "Godspeed", allows him to cover immense distances instantly, earning him descriptions as moving like "light." He mentors an up-and-coming playmaker, honing the younger player's passing ability. During a key match, he blocks what was considered the world's fastest shot. Though immensely talented, his overconfidence provokes criticism from rivals, one of whom dismisses his abilities as purely innate rather than earned.

=== Leonardo Luna ===
Voiced by: Shin'ichirō Kamio (Japanese); Brandon Acosta (English)

Leonardo Luna (レオナルド・ルナ, Reonarudo Runa) is a professional player from Spain, known as "The Scion of Royale", who plays for Real Madrid and the Spain national team. He joins Team World 5 at Blue Lock to analyze and rate the final group of Blue Lock players.

=== Noel Noa ===
Noel Noa (ノエル・ノア, Noeru Noa) is the current #1 player in the world, playing as the Master Striker of Germany's Bastard München team.

=== Alexis Ness ===
Alexis Ness (アレクシス・ネス, Arekushisu Nesu) is an 18-year-old German midfielder for Bastard München in the Neo Egoist League. Nicknamed "The Magician", he specializes in precise passing techniques like the Skyborn Daisy Cutter and Illusion Cross. His playmaking primarily supports teammate Michael Kaiser until a pivotal match where Kaiser rejects his assistance. In the decisive moment, Ness delivers an intentionally unsuitable pass, leading to Isagi scoring the winning goal instead.

== Other characters ==
=== Jinpachi Ego ===
Voiced by: Hiroshi Kamiya (Japanese); Derick Snow (English)
Portrayed by: Shojirō Yokoi (stage play), Masataka Kubota (film)

Jinpachi Ego (絵心 甚八, Ego Jinpachi) is a football strategist who co-developed the Blue Lock program alongside Noel Noa. His philosophy centers on cultivating elite strikers through ego-driven individualism, rejecting traditional team-oriented play in favor of personal ambition and self-maximization. He implements rigorous training regimens and competitive eliminations—including the First Selection and U-20 exhibition match—to force participants to evolve under extreme pressure. Ego's long-term objective is to overhaul Japan's national teams, targeting victory in the 2019 FIFA U-20 World Cup and 2022 FIFA World Cup by producing a generation of strikers who combine technical excellence with relentless self-belief.

=== Anri Teieri ===
Voiced by: Eri Yukimura (Japanese); Kasi Hollowell (English)
Portrayed by: Mei Hata (film)

Anri Teieri (帝襟 アンリ, Teieri Anri) is one of the key figures who created Blue Lock program and chose Ego to become the manager despite being a previously unknown name to the rest of the Japan Football Union. She is seen as someone who was incredibly ambitious but unrealistic when it came to her dreams of wanting Japan to win the FIFA World Cup despite improvements on the international stage. Throughout Blue Lock, she regularly keeps track on the progress and statistics of the players in order to give Ego recommendations on who is currently the most promising player.
