= Hana (group) =

Japanese girl group

- Hana in June 2026

Background information
- Origin: Japan
- Genre: J-pop
- Years active: 2025–present
- Labels: B-Rave; No Label; Mastersix
- Members: Chika; Naoko; Jisoo; Yuri; Momoka; Koharu; Mahina
- Website: hana.b-rave.tokyo

Hana (stylized in all caps) is a Japanese girl group formed by Chanmina and Sky-Hi through the audition show No No Girls in 2025. They are managed by Sky-Hi's company BMSG and are signed to No Label Music, a record label founded by Chanmina currently operating under Sony Music Japan. Hana officially debuted in 2025, and consists of seven members: Chika, Naoko, Jisoo, Yuri, Momoka, Koharu, and Mahina.

== History ==
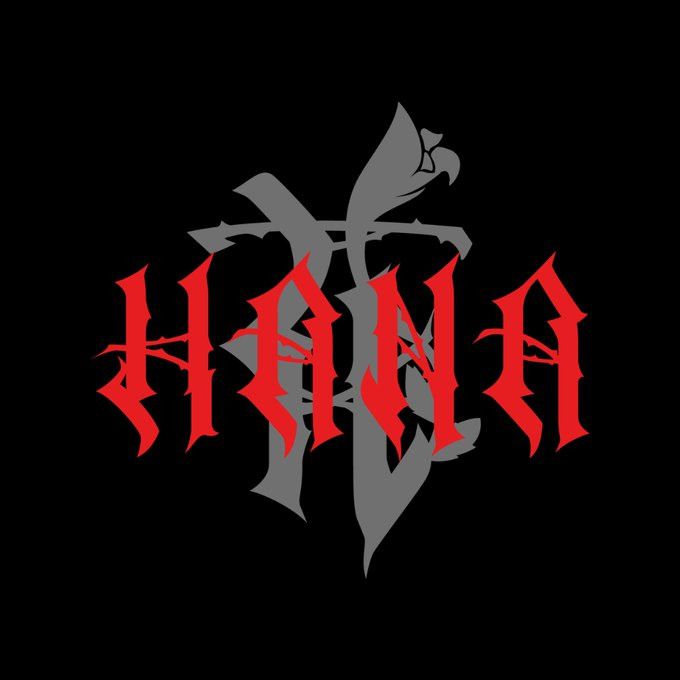
Hana's official logo.

=== 2024–2025: No No Girls ===
South Korean-Japanese rapper and singer Chanmina and Japanese rapper Sky-Hi announced an audition program, No No Girls, a survival style show to determine the members of a girl group. The pair revealed Chanmina would produce the group while Sky-Hi's talent agency BMSG would manage the group. 30 initial candidates were selected out of 7,000 applicants. The first episode of No No Girls was broadcast via YouTube on October 4, 2024.

=== 2025–present: Formation and debut ===
On January 12, 2025, Chika, Naoko, Jisoo, Yuri, Momoka, Koharu, and Mahina were the seven finalists of No No Girls, forming the group Hana. They later released their pre-debut digital single, "Drop" on January 31, 2025.

Signing with Chanmina's No Label Music and Sony Music Japan's Mastersix Foundation, Hana released their major label debut single, "Rose", on CD on April 23. The single was released digitally on April 2. "Rose" became commercially successful in Japan, debuting at number one on the Billboard Japan Hot 100. On June 9, the group released "Burning Flower". The group later announced their second major physical single, "Blue Jeans". In December, Hana revealed their first tie-in anime song "Cold Night" for the second season of the Japanese anime series Medalist. The group later released their self-titled debut studio album on February 23, 2026. Momoka and Jisoo were featured on Illit's "I Got Your Back" on July 26. The Korean version of "I Got Your Back" was released on August 17.

== Members ==
- Chika
- Naoko
- Jisoo
- Yuri
- Momoka
- Koharu
- Mahina

== Discography ==
=== Studio albums ===
List of studio albums, with selected details, chart positions, sales, certifications
Title	Details	Peak positions			Sales	Certifications
Title	Details	JPN	JPN Cmb.	JPN Hot	Sales	Certifications
Hana	Released: February 23, 2026; Label: No Label, Mastersix Foundation; Format: CD, CD+Blu-ray, digital download, streaming	2	2	1	JPN: 120,673	RIAJ: Gold (phy.)

=== Singles ===
List of singles, with selected chart positions, certifications, and sales, showing year released and album name
Title	Year	Peak positions				Sales	Certifications	Album
Title	Year	JPN	JPN Cmb.	JPN Hot	WW	Sales	Certifications	Album
"Drop"	2025	—	20	13	—		RIAJ: 2× Platinum (st.)	Hana
"Rose"	2025	3	2	1	111	JPN: 43,433	RIAJ: 3× Platinum (st.)	Hana
"Burning Flower"	2025	—	5	2	— (Note: "Burning Flower" did not enter the Billboard Global 200 chart, but peaked at number 172 on the Billboard Global Excl. US chart.)		RIAJ: Platinum (st.)	Hana
"Blue Jeans"	2025	3	1	1	79	JPN: 43,726	RIAJ: 3× Platinum (st.)	Hana
"Bad Love"	2025	—	4	1	— (Note: "Bad Love" did not enter the Billboard Global 200 chart, but peaked at number 164 on the Billboard Global Excl. US chart.)		RIAJ: Platinum (st.)	Hana
"My Body"	2025	—	7	4	—		RIAJ: Platinum (st.)	Hana
"Non Stop"	2025	—	7	4	180		RIAJ: Platinum (st.)	Hana
"Cold Night"	2026	7	9	6	—	JPN: 6,271		Hana
"All In"	2026	—	10	8	—			Hana
"Bad Girl"	2026	—	14	9	—			TBA
"Slidin"	2026	—	22	11	—			TBA
"—" denotes releases that did not chart or were not released in that region.

=== Other charted songs ===
List of other charted songs, with selected chart positions, showing year released and album nameList of other charted songs
Title	Year	Peaks		Certifications	Album
Title	Year	JPN Cmb.	JPN Hot	Certifications	Album
"Tiger"	2025	—	18	RIAJ: Platinum (st.)	Hana
"Bloom"	2026	23	16		Hana
"—" denotes releases that did not chart or were not released in that region.

== Videography ==
=== Music videos ===
Title	Year	Director(s)	Ref.
"Drop"	2025	Riku Ozama	
"Rose"	2025	Kim Young-jo (Naive), Yoo Seung-woo (Naive)	
"Burning Flower"	2025	Kim Young-jo (Naive)	
"Blue Jeans"	2025	Takuro Okubo	
"Bad Love"	2025	G2 Yuki Tsujimoto (Noboder)	
"My Baby"	2025	Takuro Okubo	
"Nonstop"	2025	VISHOP	
"Cold Night"	2026	Takuro Okubo	
"All In"	2026	Chanmina	
"I Got Your Back" Illit (featuring Jisoo and Momoka of Hana)	2026	Xavier Tera	

== Filmography ==
=== Television shows ===
Year	Title	Notes	Ref.
2024–2025	No No Girls	Survival show determining Hana's members	
