= List of My Happy Marriage characters =

This is a list of characters of the light novel series My Happy Marriage.

== Main characters ==
Miyo Saimori (斎森 美世, Saimori Miyo)
Voiced by: Reina Ueda (Japanese); Miranda Parkin, Juliet Peldon (young) (English)
Portrayed by: Mio Imada (live-action film)
Miyo is a kind-hearted and beautiful 19-year-old young woman who is the eldest daughter of the Saimori family. Seemingly born without any supernatural talent, she had a very traumatic upbringing as she was relentlessly and abusively treated like a servant by her stepmother and younger half-sister, while her own father deemed her to be useless and never showed her love or protected her from the abuse. Years later, Miyo's father had her married off to Kiyoka Kudou, a "ruthless soldier" and the head of the famous Kudou family, just so she can be "at least much useful" to both him and the Saimoris. It is later revealed that she is connected to the infamous Usuba family through her mother, making her highly sought after for her offspring's potential for great supernatural abilities.
Kiyoka Kudou (久堂 清霞, Kudō Kiyoka)
Voiced by: Kaito Ishikawa (Japanese); Damien Haas (English)
Portrayed by: Ren Meguro (live-action film), Kazuaki Yasue (stage play)
The 27-year-old head of the Kudou family and leader of the Special Anti-Grotesquerie Unit. Described as a "ruthless soldier", anyone who becomes his fiancée flees after only three days due to his cold and intimidating demeanor, but this changes upon meeting Miyo whom he falls in love with. Kiyoka is a gifted individual with multiple supernatural abilities including electrokinesis, pyrokinesis and hydrokinesis. Once Miyo gets along with Kiyoka, Kiyoka reveals that the actual reasons why his previous fiancées fled after only three days was due to them either being madly obsessed in being with him, or being desperate for both luxurious living and his family's wealth.

== Saimori family ==
Kaya Saimori (斎森 香耶, Saimori Kaya)
Voiced by: Yuki Yagi (PV), Ayane Sakura (anime) (Japanese); Lizzie Freeman, Lila Peldon (young) (English)
Portrayed by: Akari Takaishi (live-action film)
Miyo's spoiled, arrogant, pompous and egocentric younger half-sister who is engaged to Kouji Tatsuishi. She has the supernatural gift of the Saimori family. After Miyo's kidnapping incident, Kaya is punished for her role in the kidnapping Miyo as she is sent away to work as a live-in servant for a very strict family, while she remained guilt-ridden and barely remorseful for her decisions and behavior.
Shinichi Saimori (斎森 真一, Saimori Shin'ichi)
Voiced by: Hiroshi Yanaka (Japanese); Richard Tatum (English)
Portrayed by: Tsutomu Takahashi (live-action film)
The head of the Saimori family and the father of Miyo and Kaya. He is arrogant, stubborn and vain man who never showed love to Miyo and her mother Sumi (Shinichi's first wife) due to Miyo currently lacking supernatural and magical talents, and pompously favors Kaya over Miyo since they were children, due to his second daughter inheriting the supernatural talents of the Saimori family. He even had Miyo married off to Kiyoka Kudo in order to make a use out of her for his agenda. However, when Kiyoka learned Miyo's family abuse, he personally informed Shinichi that the Saimoris will receive none of the traditional benefits from Miyo marrying into the Kudou family will be given unless Miyo receives full apology, much to Shinichi's reluctance. After Miyo's kidnapping incident, the family lost their home and most of their fortune from the fire, forcing Shinichi and Kanako to live in the countryside as commoners.
Kanoko Saimori (斎森 香乃子, Saimori Kanoko)
Voiced by: Kana Ueda (Japanese); Erica Schroeder (English)
Portrayed by: Sayaka Yamaguchi (live-action film)
Miyo's stepmother and Kaya's biological mother. She is a ruthless and treacherous woman who mercilessly abused Miyo as she is the daughter of Sumi, who was her "love rival", despite the fact that the marriage between Shinichi and Sumi was arranged purely for political reasons, for all the inconveniences that happen around her. Along with her daughter, Kanoko was also involved in Miyo's kidnapping incident planned by Minoru Tatsuishi. However, after Miyo's kidnapping incident, Kanoko and her husband were forced to move to the countryside as commoners after losing their home and most of their fortune from the fire, while Kaya was sent away to work as a live-in servant for a very strict yet wealthy family due to her involvement in the incident.
Hana Kanao (金尾 花, Kanao Hana)
Voiced by: Mamiko Noto (Japanese); Mela Lee (English)
Portrayed by: Ryoko Kobayashi (live-action film)
Miyo's former caretaker and servant of the Saimori family. Years after she was dismissed by the Saimoris for sticking up for Miyo, Kiyoka invited Hana, reuniting her and Miyo. Later, Hana and her husband attended Miyo and Kiyoka's wedding banquet in Volume 7 of the novel.
Sumi Saimori (斎森 澄美, Saimori Sumi)
Voiced by: Noriko Hidaka, Miyuri Shimabukuro (young) (Japanese); Miranda Parkin, Kayley Stallings (young) (English)
Portrayed by: Tao Tsuchiya (live-action film)
The late mother of Miyo and the first wife of Shinichi. Sumi was also a member of the Usuba family and was telepathic. She died under mysterious circumstances when Miyo was still a child. It is revealed that before her death, Sumi temporarily sealed Miyo's spiritual gift to protect her daughter from being exploited, though her husband Shinichi was yet to be ever aware of this.

== Tatsuishi family ==
Kouji Tatsuishi (辰石 幸次, Tatsuishi Kōji)
Voiced by: Kōtarō Nishiyama (Japanese); Michael Lorz (English)
Portrayed by: Yuki Ogoe (live-action film)
The kindhearted but somewhat cowardly second son of the Tatsuishi family who has been Miyo's sole friend and ally for many years. He is Kaya's fiancé and the future head of the Saimori family. When Kouji learned his father's wicked plot in kidnapping Miyo, Kouji asked Kiyoka for help in rescuing Miyo. After the kidnapping incident, Kouji trains in the old capital to improve his abilities, yet kept his engagement to Kaya, despite her estranged relationship with him.
Minoru Tatsuishi (辰石 実, Tatsuishi Minoru)
Voiced by: Kenyū Horiuchi (Japanese); Mick Wingert (English)
Portrayed by: Yūsuke Hirayama (live-action film)
The previous head of Tatsuishi family and the father of Kazushi and Kouji. A greedy and cold-hearted man, Minoru only desires Miyo's bloodline from the Usuba family, even willing to have her kidnapped to ensure it for his family's prosperity. When Kiyoka came to confront Minoru, Minoru prevented him from rescuing Miyo. His selfish actions become his downfall as his conflict with Kiyoka set the Saimori family estate in blazes; Minoru was later incapacitated by Kiyoka's electrokinesis. After Miyo's kidnapping incident, Minoru was forced to step down from his position, and is replaced by his eldest son Kazushi as the new head of the family.
Kazushi Tatsuishi (辰石 一志, Tatsuishi Kazushi)
Voiced by: Toshinari Fukamachi (Japanese); Ryan Colt Levy (English)
Portrayed by: Hisanori Satō (stage play)
The oldest son of Minoru Tatsuishi and Kouji's older brother. Kazushi is the heir to the Tatsuishi family with a skill in dispelling arts. He later becomes the head of the Tatsuishi family, replacing Minoru for his actions in Miyo's kidnapping. Kazushi assisted the Special Anti-Grotesquerie Unit when Grotesqueries were released from the sealed burial grounds. He once again assisted the Special Anti-Grotesquerie Unit during the investigation of innocent people being forced to turn into Grotesqueries, and later helped Miyo in rescuing Kiyoka, who was held captive by the Gifted Communion.

== Kudou family ==
Yurie (ゆり江)
Voiced by: Houko Kuwashima (Japanese); Karen Huie (English)
Portrayed by: Mirai Yamamoto (live-action film)
Kiyoka's elderly servant who works for his household.
Hazuki Kudou (久堂 葉月, Kudō Hazuki)
Voiced by: Yoko Hikasa (Japanese); Felecia Angelle (English)
Kiyoka's older sister. She is the ex-wife of Masashi Ookaito and mother of Asahi Ookaito. It is revealed Hazuki had a political marriage with Masashi but they divorced due to her complications of being an ideal housewife. She has healing abilities from her maternal family.
Tadakiyo Kudou (久堂 正清, Kudō Tadakiyo)
Voiced by: Ryōtarō Okiayu (Japanese); Jason Griffith (English)
Kiyoka's father. Tadakiyo is former head of the Kudou family. Despite being born with a weak constitution, his supernatural abilities are very powerful as Tadakiyo assisted the Special Anti-Grotesquerie Unit in confronting the Gifted Communion.
Fuyu Kudou (久堂 芙由, Kudō Fuyu)
Voiced by: Kikuko Inoue (Japanese); Monique Shi (English)
Kiyoka's mother. Fuyu is a foul-tempered woman who is extremely haughty and abrasive to everyone around her thanks to her privilege and upbringing. She intitally rejected Miyo as Kiyoka's fiancée.

== Usuba family ==
Arata Tsuruki (鶴木 新, Tsuruki Arata)
Voiced by: Ryōhei Kimura, Kaede Yuasa (young) (Japanese); Ryan Colt Levy (English)
Portrayed by: Keisuke Watanabe (live-action film), Shūji Kikuchi (stage play)
Born as Arata Usuba (薄刃 新, Usuba Arata), the son of the head of the Usuba family and Miyo's cousin. He works for the Tsuruki Trading Company as a negotiator. He has an ability to make illusions.
Yoshirou Usuba (薄刃 義浪, Usuba Yoshirō)
Voiced by: Kōsei Hirota (Japanese); Mike Pollock (English)
Portrayed by: Shōhei Hino (live-action film)
The grandfather of Miyo and Arata. Despite the fact Arata's father is the head of the Usubas, Yoshirou is actually in charge of the family.
Naoshi Usui (甘水 直, Usui Naoshi)
Voiced by: Yūya Uchida, Shiki Aoki (young) (Japanese); Kaiji Tang, Caleb Yen (young) (English)
A branch member of the Usui family who shares the Usuba blood. Naoshi is the leader and founder of the Gifted Communion. He has the ability to manipulate the senses.

== Special Anti-Grotesquerie Unit ==
Yoshito Godou (五道 佳斗, Godō Yoshito)
Voiced by: Hiro Shimono (Japanese); Cedric Williams (English)
Portrayed by: Ōshirō Maeda (live-action film), Tōya Morita (stage play)
A soldier belonging to the Special Anti-Grotesquerie Unit who is Kiyoka's subordinate.
Masashi Ookaito (大海渡 征, Ōkaito Masashi)
Voiced by: Kenta Miyake (Japanese); Joe Hernandez (English)
Portrayed by: Takashi Sasaki (stage play)
Kiyoka's superior and Hazuki's ex-husband. He is also the father of Asahi Ookaito.
Kaoruko Jinnouchi (陣之内薫子, Jinnouchi Kaoruko)
Voiced by: Haruka Tomatsu (Japanese); Kayley Stallings (English)
A soldier of the Special Anti-Grotesquerie Unit. Kaoruko is Kiyoka's former marriage candidate. She also serves as Miyo's bodyguard temporarily. Despite being the only female soldier in the Special Anti-Grotesquerie Unit, Kaoruko was unfairly treated by her male colleagues until she was befriended by Miyo, who supported her. Kaoruko was later exposed as the traitor by Usui for tampering the barrier while she, Mukadeyama and the other soldiers protect Miyo from Usui. However, when Kaoruko revealed that she found out that Gifted Communion held her father hostage, she was too late to realize that she was deceived by Usui's opinokinesis. Following the incident, Kaoruko is given a minor punishment and stays in touch with Miyo.
Mukadeyama (百足山)
A squad leader of the Special Anti-Grotesquerie Unit.
Itsuto Godou (五道 壱斗, Godō Itsuto)
The former commanding officer of Special Anti-Grotesquerie Unit. Itsuto was the father of Yoshito, and was killed in the line of duty battling a powerful Grotesquerie, the Earth Spider.

== Imperial family ==
Emperor (帝, Mikado)
Voiced by: Takayuki Sugō (Japanese); Richard Tatum (English)
Portrayed by: Renji Ishibashi (live-action film)
The ruler of Japan in the 19th-century Taishō era. Despite that he is the reigning ruler, the Emperor lost his gift of precognition to his illness. It is later revealed he has a lingering fear of the Usubas' dream-related abilities, believing that it can surpass the Imperial family's precognition abilities.
Takaihito (堯人)
Voiced by: Akira Ishida (Japanese); Kayleigh McKee (English)
Portrayed by: Ryūsei Ōnishi (live-action film), Satsuki Nakayama (stage play)
The second prince of the Imperial family. Like his father, Takaihito has precognition abilities. When he spends his time with Miyo, Hazuki, Yurie and Kaoruko on a ladies' night party, Takaihito prefers to be addressed as "Lady Takako".

== Other characters ==
Keiko (桂子)
Voiced by: Tamie Kubota (Japanese); Jenn Wong (English)
Portrayed by: Ryō Tamaki (live-action film)
The owner of a kimono shop, Suzushima, that has served the Kudou family for generations.
Iwashimizu (岩清水)
Voiced by: Hiroshi Kōsaka (Japanese); Steven Allerick (English)
Kiyoka's informant. He helps Kiyoka on gathering informations relating to the Saimoris and the Usubas. Iwashimizu only appears in the anime adaptation.
Asahi Ookaito (大海渡 旭, Ōkaito Asahi)
Voiced by: Mutsumi Tamura
The son of Masashi Ookaito and Hazuki Kudou.
Jakuji Unan (雲庵 雀児, Unan Jakuj)
A doctor at the Imperial military hospital. Due to his occupation, he has healing abilities. He is also the relative of Fuyu Kudou.
Takakura (鷹倉)
Voiced by: Tōru Sakurai (Japanese); Chris Tergliafera (English)
A close aide of Prince Takaihito. He is the Lord Keeper of the Privy Seal in the imperial court.
Houjou (宝上, Hōjō)
Usui's right-hand man and member of the Gifted Communion.
