= The Apothecary Diaries (TV series) =

Japanese anime television series

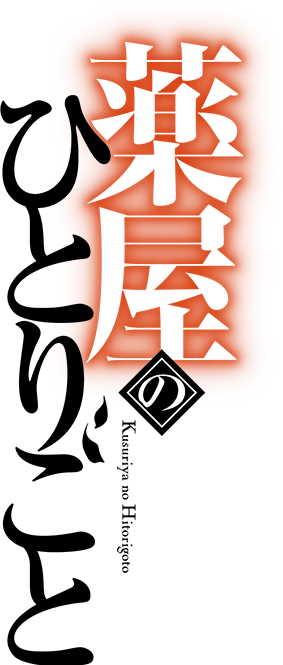
- 薬屋のひとりごと; Kusuriya no Hitorigoto
- Type: TV series
- Genre: Historical fiction; Mystery
- Based on: The Apothecary Diaries by Hyūganatsu and Touko Shino
- Directed by: Norihiro Naganuma (S1); Akinori Fudesaka (S2)
- Series composition: Norihiro Naganuma
- Character designer: Yukiko Nakatani
- Music by: Satoru Kōsaki; Kevin Penkin; Arisa Okehazama
- Voices of: Aoi Yūki; Takeo Ōtsuka; Katsuyuki Konishi; Atsumi Tanezaki; Yui Ishikawa; Takuya Kirimoto
- No. of seasons: 3
- No. of episodes: 56 (list of episodes)

Production
- Studios: Toho Animation Studio (S1-S2); OLM
- "The Apothecary Diaries" Project (Note: Label consisting of numerous companies)

Original release
- Network: NNS (Nippon TV)
- Release: October 22, 2023 – present

The Apothecary Diaries (Japanese: 薬屋のひとりごと, Hepburn: Kusuriya no Hitorigoto) is a Japanese anime television series based on the light novel series The Apothecary Diaries written by Hyūganatsu and illustrated by Touko Shino. Set in a fictional country inspired by Imperial China, the series follows Maomao, a young woman trained in medicine who is sold into service at the emperor's palace.

The first season aired on Nippon Television and its NNS affiliates from October 2023 to March 2024, followed by a second season which ran from January 10 to July 4, 2025. Internationally, Crunchyroll licensed the series for streaming outside of Asia, with Netflix also carrying the title in various regions. On October 22, 2025, during a special second-anniversary event, a third season was announced for an October 2026 premiere as a split-cour broadcast. Additionally, an original anime film entitled The Late Lady's Treasure written by Hyūganatsu is set to premiere in Japan on December 11, 2026.

== Synopsis ==
Maomao, a young apothecary raised in the capital's pleasure district, is kidnapped and sold into service at the Imperial Palace as a lowly laundry maid. While attempting to serve her two-year contract in anonymity, she learns of a mysterious illness afflicting the emperor's infant heirs. Suspecting the cause is toxic face powder used by the concubines, she leaves an anonymous warning that saves the life of the infant Princess Lingli. Her actions are discovered by Jinshi, an influential eunuch who manages the Rear Palace. Recognizing her expertise, Jinshi promotes her to be the personal lady-in-waiting and poison tester for Lady Gyokuyou, the emperor's favorite consort. Maomao is subsequently tasked with investigating various medical mysteries, political intrigues, and forensic puzzles within the court, while navigating the dangerous social hierarchy of the palace, which is similar to her experience of the social hierarchy in the pleasure district.

== Series overview ==
Season	Episodes		Originally released	
Season	Episodes		First released	Last released
1	24		October 22, 2023	March 24, 2024
2	24		January 10, 2025	July 4, 2025
3	24	12	October 2, 2026	TBA
3	24	12	April 2027	TBA

== Cast and characters ==
Character	Japanese voice actor	English dub actor
Maomao	Aoi Yūki	Emi Lo
Jinshi	Takeo Ōtsuka	Kaiji Tang
Gaoshun	Katsuyuki Konishi	Alex Hom
Gyokuyō	Atsumi Tanezaki	Molly Zhang
Lihua	Yui Ishikawa	Trina Nishimura
Lakan	Takuya Kirimoto	Ricco Fajardo

== Production ==
Producer Mitsuteru Hishiyama made fidelity to the original novel a key focus in the production of the anime series, with the goal of reaching a broad audience. Director and series composer Norihiro Naganuma took on both roles to enhance the quality of the work and to ensure that the story’s complexity remained accessible to the general public. Furthermore, Hyūganatsu participates in script meetings and voice-recording sessions, allowing the staff to draw ideas from the author whenever they wish to incorporate new scenes not found in the novel.

Naganuma described the anime version of Maomao as a person who is expressing her emotions for the first time in contrast to her more emotionless state from the drama CD. Naganuma said that Maomao shows notable growth in the first season when she expresses her trauma to Jinshi in the final episodes. Naganuma also saw Gaoshun as a caretaker to both Jinshi and Maomao, able to tell how close they had become. Naganuma identified a key challenge regarding conventional methods of artistic expression, opting to prepare approximately ten distinct color palettes for the evening sky—each tailored to the specific weather conditions and the emotions of the characters. The episodes of the first season are structured as a split narrative: the first half focuses on Maomao, while the second half introduces other characters—including Jinshi. Consequently, the first part is told from Maomao’s perspective, whereas the second adopts a slightly broader scope, resulting in an ensemble drama. Akira Fudesaka, who took over as director starting with the second season, stated that the goal of the anime adaptation is to "show that the characters are truly alive," bringing every human trait to life through visual and auditory elements. Fudesaka further noted that the staff implemented subtle adjustments—covering aspects such as weather, culture, attire, and color palettes—to align with the new setting of the third season. Additionally, Fudesaka mentioned that he slightly altered a scene from the original source material, intentionally extending its duration so that "[Maomao and Jinshi] remain staring at each other in silence, motionless, with her arm still held in his hands."

== Release ==
The anime television series adaptation, produced by Toho Animation Studio and OLM, was announced on February 16, 2023. It was directed and written by Norihiro Naganuma, with Akinori Fudesaka serving as assistant director for the first season and later replacing Norihiro as director of the second season. Yukiko Nakatani designed the characters, and Satoru Kōsaki, Kevin Penkin, and Alisa Okehazama all composed the music. The two consecutive-cours series aired from October 22, 2023, to March 24, 2024, on Nippon TV and its affiliates. (Note: Nippon TV listed the series premiere on October 21 at 25:05, effectively October 22 at 1:05 a.m. JST.)

Following the conclusion of the first season broadcast, a second season was announced. It aired from January 10 to July 4, 2025, on the Friday Anime Night programming block on Nippon TV and its affiliates.

Following the conclusion of the second season broadcast, a sequel to the anime series was announced. On the second anniversary of the anime's premiere, it was announced to be a third season that premiered on October 2, 2026. The season, now produced solely by OLM, will run in two split cours, with its second premiering in April 2027. Following, which the movie The Late Lady of treasure is set to release on December 11th 2026 in Japanese while the English version doesn't have a set date.

=== International release ===
Crunchyroll is streaming the series worldwide outside Asia, in addition to the Middle East, the CIS (excluding Russia and Belarus), and South Asia. The first cours of the first season was released on Blu-ray on January 28, 2025, while the second cours was released on March 25 of the same year. The second season was released on November 10, 2026. Netflix has streamed the series in select Asian regions.

=== Maomao's monologue ===
Since October 24, 2023, the Tōhō Animation YouTube channel has been releasing short episodes titled Maomao's monologue (Japanese: 猫猫のひとりごと, Hepburn: Maomao no Hitorigoto)—featuring chibi-style characters explaining details from each episode of the anime series—and began uploading a new episode every Monday following the anime's TV broadcast. A second season ran from January 13 to July 6, 2025, and a third season was released on October 4, 2026.

=== Film ===
An anime film was announced in October 2025, and will feature a new story written by Hyūganatsu. On July 2, 2026, it was revealed that the film would be titled The Apothecary Diaries: The Late Lady's Treasure, with a premiere scheduled for December 11 of the same year in Japan, distributed by Toho Co., Ltd. The movie will be produced solely by Toho Animation Studio. It was also announced that Mariya Ise will voice Mu Qing, an original character for the film. Crunchyroll had acquired the North American and worldwide rights (excluding Asia but including India) for the film.

== Music ==
The musical score for the series is a collaborative project composed by Satoru Kōsaki, Kevin Penkin, and Arisa Okehazama. The official soundtrack, containing 47 tracks, was released digitally by Milan Records and Toho Animation Records on March 25, 2024.

For the first season, the first opening theme song is "Hana ni Natte" (花になって; lit. 'Be a Flower') performed by Ryokuoushoku Shakai, while the first ending theme song is "Aikotoba" (アイコトバ; lit. 'The Spell') performed by Aina the End. The second opening theme song is "Ambivalent" (アンビバレント) performed by Uru, while the second ending theme song is "Ai wa Kusuri" (愛は薬; lit. 'Love is Medicine'), performed by Wacci.

For the second season, the first opening theme song is "Hyakka Ryōran" (百花繚乱; lit. 'Splendid Bounty') performed by Lilas Ikuta, while the first ending theme song is "Shiawase no Recipe" (幸せのレシピ; lit. 'The Recipe for Happiness') performed by Dai Hirai. The second opening theme song is "Kusushiki" (クスシキ; lit. 'Mysterious') performed by Mrs. Green Apple, while the second ending theme song is "Hitorigoto" (ひとりごと; lit. 'Soliloquy') performed by Omoinotake.

For the third season, the first opening theme song is "Kumo o Nukekazashimo e Watashidake" (雲を抜け風下へ私だけ; lit. 'Beyond the Clouds, Only Me Downwind') performed by Yorushika, while the first ending theme song is "AIYOU", performed by Eve.

For the anime film, the theme song is "Haru ga Tomori" (春が灯り, lit. 'Spring is Aglow') performed by Kenshi Yonezu.

== Reception ==
=== Critical response ===
James Beckett of Anime News Network praised the first season's premiere for its unique premise, noting that the series' strength lies in Maomao's characterization as a "refreshingly pragmatic and cynical protagonist" who uses her intellect to navigate the dangers of the imperial court. In a later review, Beckett highlighted the "meticulous attention to detail" regarding the series' historical setting and the chemistry between the lead characters.

Writing for IGN Southeast Asia, Dale Bashir noted that the series stood out by focusing on deduction and forensic science within a palace setting. He highlighted that the production quality from Toho Animation Studio and OLM successfully elevated the source material, making it one of the most prominent titles of its season.

=== Popularity ===
Season 1 of the anime was ranked as the fifth most-streamed title in Japan in 2024. Season 2 ranked as the most-watched anime series of 2025 through Japanese streaming services such as U-Next, Abema, and DMM TV. The anime series was ranked as the second most popular series on Netflix Japan during the period 2021–2025, only surpassed by Spy × Family.

According to FeverCos, Maomao ranked third in the "Top 10 Most Influential Cosplay Characters of 2025".

=== Accolades ===
The anime ranked seventh in Anime News Network's "Top 10 Anime of 2024", with Caitlin Moore praising the series' plot and Aoi Yūki's voice acting. In 2025, the anime was nominated for 13 categories at the 9th Crunchyroll Anime Awards, including the Anime of the Year. Aoi Yūki, for her work as Maomao, won its only award for Best Voice Artist Performance (Japanese). The second season of the anime won five awards including Best Drama and Best Director for Akinori Fudesaka and Norihiro Naganuma, while it was nominated for 11 other categories including Anime of the Year in the 10th edition.

The anime was also nominated for Best Anime Series at the 5th Astra TV Awards. It won the 2025 Animage's Anime Grand Prix with Maomao and Jinshi taking the first and fourth places in the Best Character category. Aoi Yūki and Takeo Ōtsuka took the first and fifth places in the Best Voice Actor category for their respective roles as Maomao and Jinshi.

=== Awards and nominations ===
Year	Award	Category	Recipient	Result	Ref.
2023	Reiwa Anisong Awards	Artist Song Award	"Hana ni Natte" by Ryokuoushoku Shakai	Nominated	
2023	AT-X	Top Anime Ranking	The Apothecary Diaries	5th place	
2023	AT-X 25th Anniversary	Favorite Series	The Apothecary Diaries	5th place	
2023	AT-X 25th Anniversary	Recommended Series	The Apothecary Diaries	3rd place	
2023	AT-X 25th Anniversary	Favorite Anisong	"Hana ni Natte" by Ryokuoushoku Shakai	7th place	
2024	D-Anime Store Awards	Recommended Anime	The Apothecary Diaries	Won	
2024	TVer Awards	Special Award	The Apothecary Diaries	Won	
2024	46th Anime Grand Prix	Grand Prix	The Apothecary Diaries	5th place	
2024	46th Anime Grand Prix	Best Character	Maomao	5th place	
2024	Japan Expo Awards	Daruma for Best Anime	The Apothecary Diaries	Nominated	
2024	Japan Expo Awards	Daruma for Best Suspense Anime	The Apothecary Diaries	Won	
2024	19th AnimaniA Awards	Best TV Series: Online	The Apothecary Diaries	Won	
2024	Yahoo! Japan Search Awards	Anime Category	The Apothecary Diaries	3rd place	
2024	Billboard Japan Music Awards	Hot 100	"Hana ni Natte" by Ryokuoushoku Shakai	17th place	
2024	Billboard Japan Music Awards	Most Downloaded Songs	"Hana ni Natte" by Ryokuoushoku Shakai	10th place	
2024	Billboard Japan Music Awards	Hot Animation	"Hana ni Natte" by Ryokuoushoku Shakai	8th place	
2024	IGN Awards	Best Anime Series	The Apothecary Diaries	Runner-up	
2025	AT-X	Top Anime Ranking	The Apothecary Diaries	3rd place	
2025	Fan ga Atsui, Anime Manga Awards	Best Current Broadcasting Anime	The Apothecary Diaries Season 2	Won	
2025	Fan ga Atsui, Anime Manga Awards	Best Theme Song	"Hyakka Ryōran" by Lilas Ikuta	Won	
2025	9th Crunchyroll Anime Awards	Anime of the Year	The Apothecary Diaries	Nominated	
2025	9th Crunchyroll Anime Awards	Best New Series	The Apothecary Diaries	Nominated	
2025	9th Crunchyroll Anime Awards	Best Drama	The Apothecary Diaries	Nominated	
2025	9th Crunchyroll Anime Awards	Best Background Art	The Apothecary Diaries	Nominated	
2025	9th Crunchyroll Anime Awards	Best Character Design	Yukiko Nakatani	Nominated	
2025	9th Crunchyroll Anime Awards	Best Director	Norihiro Naganuma	Nominated	
2025	9th Crunchyroll Anime Awards	Best Main Character	Maomao	Nominated	
2025	9th Crunchyroll Anime Awards	Best Supporting Character	Jinshi	Nominated	
2025	9th Crunchyroll Anime Awards	Best Voice Artist Performance (Japanese)	Aoi Yūki as Maomao	Won	
2025	9th Crunchyroll Anime Awards	Best Voice Artist Performance (Portuguese)	Gigi Patta as Maomao	Nominated	
2025	9th Crunchyroll Anime Awards	Best Voice Artist Performance (French)	Julien Allouf as Jinshi	Nominated	
2025	9th Crunchyroll Anime Awards	Best Voice Artist Performance (Italian)	Andrea Oldani as Jinshi	Nominated	
2025	9th Crunchyroll Anime Awards	Best Voice Artist Performance (Spanish)	Desireé González as Maomao	Nominated	
2025	5th Astra TV Awards	Best Anime Series	The Apothecary Diaries Season 2	Nominated	
2025	TikTok First Half Trend Awards	Grand Prize	The Apothecary Diaries	Won	
2025	TikTok First Half Trend Awards	Manga and Anime Category	The Apothecary Diaries	Won	
2025	47th Anime Grand Prix	Grand Prix	The Apothecary Diaries Season 2	Won	
2025	47th Anime Grand Prix	Best Character	Maomao	Won	
2025	47th Anime Grand Prix	Best Character	Jinshi	4th place	
2025	47th Anime Grand Prix	Best Voice Actor	Aoi Yūki	Won	
2025	47th Anime Grand Prix	Best Voice Actor	Takeo Ōtsuka	5th place	
2025	20th AnimaniA Awards	Best Anime Song	"Ambivalent" by Uru	Won	
2025	15th Newtype Anime Awards	Best Work (TV/Streaming)	The Apothecary Diaries Season 2	3rd place	
2025	Yahoo! Japan Search Awards	Anime Category	The Apothecary Diaries	2nd place	
2025	TikTok Awards Japan	Anime of the Year	The Apothecary Diaries	Nominated	
2025	31st Manga Barcelona Awards	Best Anime Series Premiere	The Apothecary Diaries	Won	
2025	IGN Awards	Best Anime Series	The Apothecary Diaries Season 2	Runner-up	
2025	Abema Anime Trend Awards	Anime News Award	The Apothecary Diaries	Won	
2025	AT-X	Top Anime Ranking	The Apothecary Diaries	2nd place	
2026	8th Global Demand Awards	Most In-Demand Anime Series of 2025	The Apothecary Diaries	Nominated	
2026	D-Anime Store Awards	Worth Rewatching Anime	The Apothecary Diaries	Won	
2026	D-Anime Store Awards	Most Interesting Plot Developments	The Apothecary Diaries	Won	
2026	TVer Awards	Cool Anime Award	The Apothecary Diaries	Won	
2026	40th Japan Gold Disc Awards	Best 5 Songs by Streaming	"Kusushiki" by Mrs. Green Apple	Won	
2026	10th Crunchyroll Anime Awards	Anime of the Year	The Apothecary Diaries Season 2	Nominated	
2026	10th Crunchyroll Anime Awards	Best Drama	The Apothecary Diaries Season 2	Won	
2026	10th Crunchyroll Anime Awards	Best Background Art	The Apothecary Diaries Season 2	Nominated	
2026	10th Crunchyroll Anime Awards	Best Character Design	Yukiko Nakatani	Nominated	
2026	10th Crunchyroll Anime Awards	Best Director	Akinori Fudesaka and Norihiro Naganuma	Won	
2026	10th Crunchyroll Anime Awards	Best Main Character	Maomao	Won	
2026	10th Crunchyroll Anime Awards	Best Supporting Character	Jinshi	Nominated	
2026	10th Crunchyroll Anime Awards	Best Supporting Character	Loulan/Shisui	Nominated	
2026	10th Crunchyroll Anime Awards	"Must Protect at All Costs" Character	Maomao	Nominated	
2026	10th Crunchyroll Anime Awards	Best Score	Satoru Kōsaki, Kevin Penkin, and Alisa Okehazama	Nominated	
2026	10th Crunchyroll Anime Awards	Best Anime Song	"In Bloom" by Lilas Ikuta	Nominated	
2026	10th Crunchyroll Anime Awards	Best Voice Artist Performance (Japanese)	Aoi Yūki as Maomao	Won	
2026	10th Crunchyroll Anime Awards	Best Voice Artist Performance (English)	Emi Lo as Maomao	Nominated	
2026	10th Crunchyroll Anime Awards	Best Voice Artist Performance (Portuguese)	Gigi Patta as Maomao	Nominated	
2026	10th Crunchyroll Anime Awards	Best Voice Artist Performance (Hindi)	Abishek Sharma as Jinshi	Won	
2026	10th Crunchyroll Anime Awards	Best Voice Artist Performance (Italian)	Luna Fogu as Maomao	Nominated	
2026	10th Crunchyroll Anime Awards	Best Voice Artist Performance (Spanish)	Desireé González as Maomao	Nominated	
2026	Music Awards Japan	Best of Listeners' Choice: Japanese Song	"Kusushiki" by Mrs. Green Apple	Nominated	
2026	Japan Expo Awards	Daruma for Best Original Soundtrack	The Apothecary Diaries Season 2	Won	
2026	Japan Expo Awards	Daruma for Best Opening	"In Bloom" by Lilas Ikuta	Nominated	
2026	21st AnimaniA Awards	Best TV Sequel Series: Online	The Apothecary Diaries Season 2	Won	
2026	21st AnimaniA Awards	Best TV/Movie: Disc Release	The Apothecary Diaries	Won	
2026	21st AnimaniA Awards	Best Anime Song	"Hyakka Ryōran" by Lilas Ikuta	Nominated	
