= Emi Lo =

American voice actor

- Lo in 2026
- Occupation: Voice actor
- Years active: 2019–present
- Notable credits: Destiny in Takt Op. Destiny; Delmin in Show by Rock!! Maishumairesh!!; Columbina in Genshin Impact; Ruan Mei in Honkai: Star Rail; Maomao in The Apothecary Diaries; Kazuki Mikadono in Dealing with Mikadono Sisters Is a Breeze; Miri Unasaka in Buddy Daddies; Michiru Inukai in Talentless Nana; Akane Sawatari in Chainsaw Man; Sariphi in Sacrificial Princess and the King of Beasts
- Spouse: Zac (m. 2022)
- Website: emilo.carrd.co

Emi Lo is an American voice actor. They are primarily known for voice acting in anime dubs, and are often given the roles of younger female and male characters.

Lo is best known for their work as Maomao in The Apothecary Diaries, Columbina in Genshin Impact, Lucyna "Lucy" Kushinada in Cyberpunk: Edgerunners, Teoritta in Sentenced to Be a Hero, Hei in The Legend of Hei, Kate in Shadows House, Rinku Aimoto in D4DJ First Mix and Rena Ryūgū in the Higurashi: When They Cry anime series

== Career ==
Once a classic pianist, Lo loved acting, video games and animation from an early age. They originally wanted to pursue film but were told they "weren't pretty enough", citing the representation of Asian women on screen as they grew up.

An article published by Crunchyroll News revealed that in 2023, Lo appeared in 124 episodes and 28 different series of anime for the company's English dub productions, the most of any individual actor that year. Five of the credits were main roles, tying for the most with Megan Shipman.

At the 10th Crunchyroll Anime Awards in 2026, Lo was nominated in the category of Best Voice Artist Performance (English) for their role as Maomao in The Apothecary Diaries season 2.

== Personal life ==
Lo is agender.

In 2022, Lo married their husband Zac.

== Filmography ==
=== Anime series ===
List of voice performances in anime series
Year	Title	Role	Notes	Ref.
2019	Kono Oto Tomare! Sounds of Life	Asano Izumi		
2019	Demon Lord, Retry!	Organ		
2019	Nichijou - My Ordinary Life	Princess Starla		
2019	Kemono Friends	Small-Clawed Otter		
2019	Hensuki	Ayano Fujimoto		
2020	Smile Down the Runway	Fumiyo Niinuma		
2020	Super HxEros	Oda		
2020	Kakushigoto	Naru		
2020	Appare-Ranman!	Hototo	Main role	
2020	Our Last Crusade or the Rise of a New World	Sisbell Lou Nebulis IX		
2020	Higurashi: When They Cry – Gou	Rena Ryūgū	Lead role, also Sotsu	
2021	Wonder Egg Priority	Yae Yoshida, Kaibutsu Shoujo		
2021	D4DJ First Mix	Rinku Aimoto	Lead role	
2021	Show By Rock!! Mashumairesh!!	Delmin	Lead role	
2021	Talentless Nana	Michiru Inukai	Lead role	
2021	Edens Zero	Amira, Maria Slime		
2021–2022	Shadows House	Kate	Lead role	
2022	Requiem of the Rose King	Anne		
2022	Orient	Tsugumi Hattori	Lead role	
2022	Lupin the Third Part 6	Lily Watson		
2022	Takt Op. Destiny	Destiny, Cosette Schneider	Lead role	
2022	Shoot! Goal to the Future	Namioka		
2022	Kakegurui Twin	Chitose Inui	Netflix dub	
2022	Cyberpunk: Edgerunners	Lucy	Lead role	
2022	Shinobi no Ittoki	Satomi Tsubaki		
2022	The Yakuza's Guide to Babysitting	Yaeka	Lead role	
2022	Chainsaw Man	Akane Sawatari		
2022–2023	Summer Time Rendering	Ushio Kofune	Lead role	
2022–2026	Skeleton Knight in Another World	Ponta	Lead role	
2023	The Iceblade Sorcerer Shall Rule the World	Elisa Griffith	Lead role	
2023	Buddy Daddies	Miri Unasaka	Lead role	
2023	Tomo-chan Is a Girl!	Tomo Aizawa (young)		
2023	Jujutsu Kaisen	Fumi		
2023	Sacrificial Princess and the King of Beasts	Sariphi	Lead role	
2023	Urusei Yatsura (2022)	Kitsune		
2023	Farming Life in Another World	Yuri		
2023	The Dangers in My Heart	Sekine		
2023, 2026	That Time I Got Reincarnated as a Slime	Jaune/Carrera		
2023–present	The Apothecary Diaries	Maomao	Lead role	
2024	The Demon Sword Master of Excalibur Academy	Sakuya Sieglinde		
2024	Helck	Lotto		
2024	Spice and Wolf: Merchant Meets the Wise Wolf	Myuri		
2024	Shy	Mianlong	Season 2	
2024	Cherry Magic! Thirty Years of Virginity Can Make You a Wizard?!	Fujisaki		
2024	Why Does Nobody Remember Me in This World?	Rinne	Lead role	
2024	My Instant Death Ability Is So Overpowered	Lute		
2024	Seirei Gensouki: Spirit Chronicles	Aki Sendo	Season 2	
2024	Nina the Starry Bride	Muhulum		
2024	Jellyfish Can't Swim in the Night	Koharu		
2024	Dungeon People	Darkness Spirit		
2024	Fairy Tail: 100 Years Quest	Nasha		
2025	Dragon Ball Daima	Dende (Mini)		
2025	Loner Life in Another World	Volleyball Girl B		
2025	Solo Leveling: Arise from the Shadow	Han Song-Yi	Season 2	
2025	Blue Box	Nagisa Funami		
2025	Kaiju No. 8	Rin Shinonome	Season 2	
2025	Dealing with Mikadono Sisters Is a Breeze	Kazuki	Lead role	
2025–2026	The 100 Girlfriends Who Really, Really, Really, Really, Really Love You	Kurumi	Season 2 onwards	
2026	Sentenced to Be a Hero	Teoritta	Lead role	
2026	Dead Account	K		
2026	Go for It, Nakamura!	Hamaoka		
2026	Hanaori-san Still Wants to Fight in the Next Life	Moe		
2026	Though I Am an Inept Villainess	Kin Seika		
2026	The Daily Life of a Middle-Aged Online Shopper in Another World	Velvet		

=== Anime films ===
List of voice performances in anime films
Year	Title	Role	Notes	Ref.
2022	Bubble	Uta	Lead role	

=== Animation ===
List of voice performances in animation
Year	Series	Role	Notes	Ref.
2021	Heaven Official's Blessing	Ban Yue	Chinese donghua English dub	
2024	Jessica's Big Little World	Big Kid		
2024	Hit-Monkey	Dot		

=== Video games ===
List of voice performances in video games
Year	Title	Role	Notes	Ref.
2019	Pokémon Masters	Evelyn		
2022	Genshin Impact	Columbina	Appeared in the "Teyvat Chapter Interlude Teaser: A Winter Night's Lazzo" video on YouTube, released by Genshin Impact, on July 10, 2022.	
2022	Tower of Fantasy	Saki Fuwa		
2022	Goddess of Victory: Nikke	Neve, Pinne, Phantom	Credited in-game	
2023	Neptunia: Sisters vs Sisters	Higurashi		
2023	Wo Long: Fallen Dynasty	Da Qiao		
2023	Fitness Circuit	Naomi		
2023	Detective Pikachu Returns	Additional voices (Eiscue, Whimsicott, Leafeon, etc)		
2023	Honkai: Star Rail	Ruan Mei		
2023	Rhapsody II: Ballad of the Little Princess	Lan-Lan		
2023	Rhapsody III: Memories of Marl Kingdom	Ellie, Lan-Lan, Marius		
2023	Anonymous;Code	Iroha Kyogoku		
2024	The Legend of Heroes: Trails Through Daybreak	Ashen Lu, Olympia, citizens		
2024	Earth Defense Force: World Brothers 2	Crypto		
2024	Lost Ark	Echidna		
2025	The Legend of Heroes: Trails Through Daybreak II	Ashen Lu, citizens		
2025	Everybody's Golf Hot Shots	Lin		
2025	Identity V	"Memory" ("Little Girl")	Appeared in the "Season 37 Essence 1 Background Story" video on YouTube, released by Identity V on April 23rd, 2025.	
2025	Fire Emblem Heroes	Höðr		
2025	Path to Nowhere	Xu		
2025	Punishing: Gray Raven	Hanying Solacetune		
2026	Ace Combat 8: Wings of Theve	Tasha Seversky		
2026	Wuthering Waves	Lucy	English dub, collaboration with Cyberpunk: Edgerunners	
TBA	Muv-Luv: Project MIKHAIL	Miki Tamase	Surface Pilot 2	
