= Takeo Ōtsuka (voice actor) =

Japanese voice actor

- 大塚 剛央
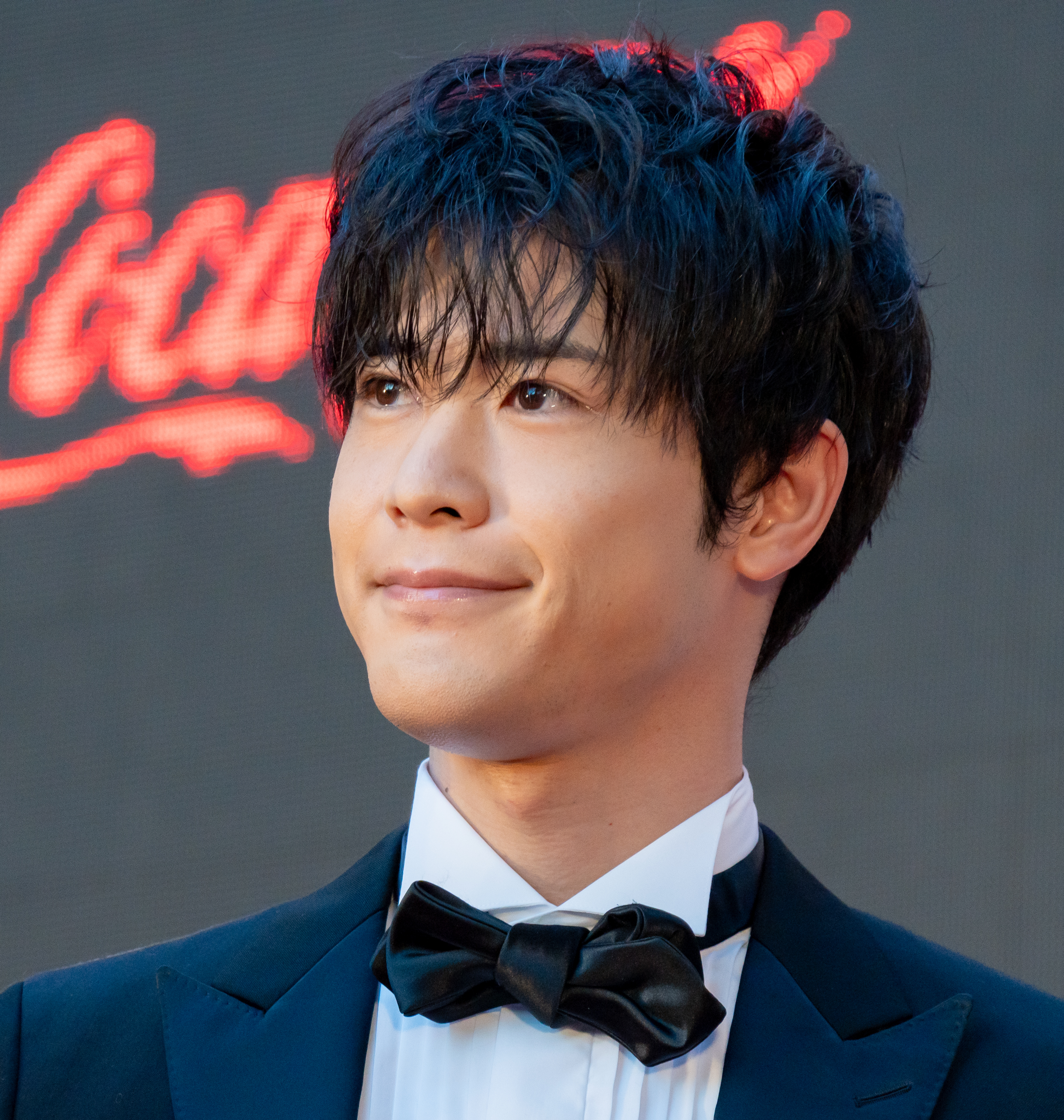
- Ōtsuka at the 36th Tokyo International Film Festival in October 2023
- Born: October 19, 1992 (age 34); Tokyo, Japan
- Occupation: Voice actor
- Years active: 2016–present
- Agent: I'm Enterprise

Takeo Ōtsuka (大塚 剛央, Ōtsuka Takeo; born October 19, 1992) is a Japanese voice actor from Tokyo. He is affiliated with I'm Enterprise.

== Life and career ==
In 2020, Ōtsuka was one of the recipients of the Best New Actor Award at the 14th Seiyu Awards.

=== Personal life ===
Ōtsuka announced on May 31, 2024, that he had married his long-time partner.

== Filmography ==
=== Television animation ===
2016

- Amanchu!

2017

- Twin Angel Break
- In Another World With My Smartphone
- Magical Circle Guru Guru – Demon Singer

2018

- Golden Kamuy
- Last Period
- The Thousand Musketeers
- Run with the Wind – Kakeru Kurahara

2019

- Dimension High School – Ryusei Midorigaoka
- Endro!
- Namu Amida Butsu! Rendai Utena – Māra
- Stars Align – Satoshi Ashitaka
- Beastars – Collot, Tem

2020

- Sleepy Princess in the Demon Castle – Poseidon
- Talentless Nana – Moguo's henchman B
- Noblesse – Takeo
- Haikyū!! (Land vs Sky OVA) – Naoyasu Kuguri

2021

- Bottom-tier Character Tomozaki – Daichi Matsumoto
- Shadows House – Gerald

2022

- Trapped in a Dating Sim: The World of Otome Games Is Tough for Mobs – Leon Fou Bartfort

2023

- Technoroid Overmind – Auru
- Malevolent Spirits: Mononogatari – Hyōma Kunato
- Flaglia – Mel
- Oshi no Ko – Aquamarine Hoshino
- The Gene of AI – Hikaru Sudō
- Synduality: Noir – Kanata
- I Shall Survive Using Potions! – Allan
- The Apothecary Diaries – Jinshi

2024

- The Demon Prince of Momochi House – Aoi Nanamori/Nue
- A Sign of Affection – Ōshi Ashioki
- Oblivion Battery – Eiichiro Kokuto
- Twilight Out of Focus – Yukitaka Honjō
- Wonderful Pretty Cure! – Gaou/Subaru
- Trillion Game – Haru Tennōji
- Haigakura – Ichiyō
- Tasūketsu: Fate of the Majority – Yoshiaki Hirayama

2025

- Medalist – Tsukasa Akeuraji
- Okinawa de Suki ni Natta Ko ga Hōgen Sugite Tsurasugiru – Teruaki Nakamura
- Even Given the Worthless "Appraiser" Class, I'm Actually the Strongest – Jasper
- The Gorilla God's Go-To Girl – Louis Scarrel
- Gnosia – Remnan
- My Status as an Assassin Obviously Exceeds the Hero's – Akira Oda
- I Saved Myself with a Potion!: Life in Another World – Asuru
- The Apothecary Diaries Season 2 – Jinshi

2026

- Jack-of-All-Trades, Party of None – Orun Dula
- Kill Blue – Tenma Tendo
- Liar Game – Shinichi Akiyama
- Suikoden: The Anime – Shu
- The Exiled Heavy Knight Knows How to Game the System – Elma Edvan
- Nippon Sangoku – Himehito Okimi
- Daemons of the Shadow Realm – Nagitsuji
- The Apothecary Diaries (season 3, part 1) – Jinshi

2027

- Matsurika Kanriden – Tenga Rei
- SSS-Class Revival Hunter – Kim Gongja
- The Final-Boss Prince Is Somehow Obsessed with the Chubby Villainess: Reincarnated Me – Wilfred
- Rainy Day Serenade – Takaaki Hongō
- The Apothecary Diaries (season 3, part 2) – Jinshi

TBA

- The Eccentric Doctor of the Moon Flower Kingdom – Keiun

=== Original net animation (ONA) ===
2024

- Gundam: Requiem for Vengeance – Ony Kasuga

=== Video games ===
- Brown Dust (2017) – Cry
- Ash Tale: Kaze no Tairiku (2019) – Link
- Namu Amida Butsu! Rendai Utena (2019) – Māra
- Luciano Dōmei (2019) – Seven
- Angelique Luminarise (2021) – Kanata
- THE iDOLM@STER: SideM (2021-) – Eishin Mayumi
- Final Fantasy XVI (2023) – Joshua Rosfield (adult)
- League of Legends (2023) – Hwei
- 18Trip (2024) – Nanaki Nanamegi
- Honkai: Star Rail (2024) – Sunday
- Chaos Zero Nightmare (2025) – Luke
- Cookie Run: Kingdom (2025) – Doughael
- Fatal Frame II: Crimson Butterfly Remake (2026) – Itsuki Tachibana
- The Apothecary Diaries: The False Imperial Brother (2027) – Jinshi

=== Animated films ===
- Flavors of Youth (2018) – Limo (Rimo)
- Seven Days War (2019) – Hiroto Honjō
- Hokkyoku Hyakkaten no Concierge-san (2023) – Eruru
- Kuramerukagari (2024) – Iseya
- The Apothecary Diaries: The Late Lady's Treasure (2026) – Jinshi
- Gekijōban Medalist (2027) – Tsukasa Akeuraji
- Ghost (2027) – Bora

=== Web anime ===
- Monster Sonic! D'Artagnan no Idol Sengen
- A.I.C.O. -Incarnation-

=== Dubbing ===
==== Live-action ====
- The Conjuring: Last Rites – Tony Spera (Ben Hardy)
- I Know What You Did Last Summer – Milo Griffin (Jonah Hauer-King)

==== Animation ====
- The Loud House – Bobby Santiago

=== Drama CD ===
- Fabulous Night – Gilgamesh
