= Maomao (The Apothecary Diaries) =

Fictional character from The Apothecary Diaries

- The Apothecary Diaries character
- Maomao as illustrated by Touko Shino
- First appearance: Chapter 1: "Maomao" (2011 webnovel, 2012 novel, 2014 light novel)
- Created by: Hyūganatsu
- Portrayed by: Mana Ashida
- Voiced by: Japanese: Aoi Yūki; English: Emi Lo

Maomao (Japanese: 猫猫(マオマオ)) is the protagonist of Hyūganatsu's light novel series The Apothecary Diaries. Set in a fictional country based on Imperial China during the Tang dynasty, Maomao is a girl working as an apothecary in a red-light district, who was kidnapped and sold to the Imperial Palace as an indentured servant, and gradually rises to the station of court pharmacist. Even though she intended to remain anonymous, her actions catch the attention of Jinshi, an influential eunuch. She then undertakes the solving of mysteries for the royal court.

Maomao's character was created after Hyūganatsu experimented in the original webnovel what kind of pharmacist would work well in a narrative, originally aiming to have a mature woman with three children. The staff behind the anime adaptation claimed that she is originally stoic but gradually becomes more expressive when interacting with others, most notably Jinshi. In the anime she is voiced by Aoi Yūki in Japanese while Emi Lo is in charge in the English localization. For the upcoming 2028 live-action based on the series, Mana Ashida will portray the protagonist.

Critical response to Maomao has been generally positive for possessing traits rarely seen in other series as well as her portrayal as an unreliable narrator. Her relationship with Jinshi also stood out as a result of their contrasting personalities which initially come across as distant due to the environment they are put in. The character was often regarded as one of the best ones in anime since the anime's first season debuted.

== Creation ==
Hyuganatsu originally had in mind was a story about a woman with three children living in a mining town. It was a mystery where she discovers people who have died from poison, but she thought it probably wouldn't be well-received. There are a lot of light novels on the Shōsetsuka ni Narō Japanese online novel platform, so she figured it would be better to have a young protagonist. From the concept of a "woman with three children," the protagonist of The Apothecary Diaries, Maomao, was created. By making her a pharmacist, the author gave her knowledge of medicine. Hyūganatsu developed Maomao to come across as a strong character who gradually becomes a more sympathetic individual through her constant work in the district and her relationship with Jinshi. Anime director Norihiro Naganuma described the anime version of Maomao as a person who is expressing her emotions for the first time in contrast to her more emotionless state from the drama CD. The character was praised by critics for her strong personality and work involving medicine while also highlighting her subtle relationship with Jinshi, which Hyuganatsu wrote to provide an opportunity for gradual character development. In order to show Maomao as a more capable character, Hyuganatsu also created the skilled but flawed Doctor Guen to serve as a contrast to Maomao, who would overshadow him.

Naganuma said that Maomao shows notable growth as a human in the first season when discussing her trauma with Jinshi. Still, the director said Maomao does not understand love which is one of the main themes of the story. In contrast to the anime, Naganuma noted that Maomao is more emotionless in the drama CD. Additionally, the anime adaptation had several plot changes to make Maomao's perspective the center of the story, sometimes even overshadowing the main events.

The anime team suggested the idea of self-love as the subject matter for the anime's first opening theme "Be a Flower" by Ryokuoushoku Shakai, so Haruko Nagaya wrote the lyrics to connect the theme of self-love to the character of Maomao, whom she described as the opposite of a typical protagonist. For "Hyakka Ryōran" performed by Lilas Ikuta, Maomao was illustrated and written as Alice in Wonderland, drawing parallels between both protagonists and how their new lives in the narrative affect their characterizations.

=== Casting ===
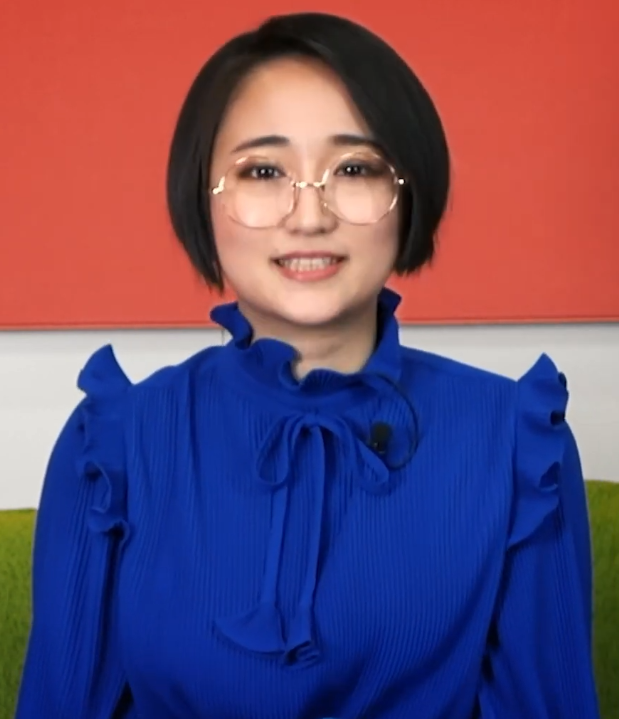
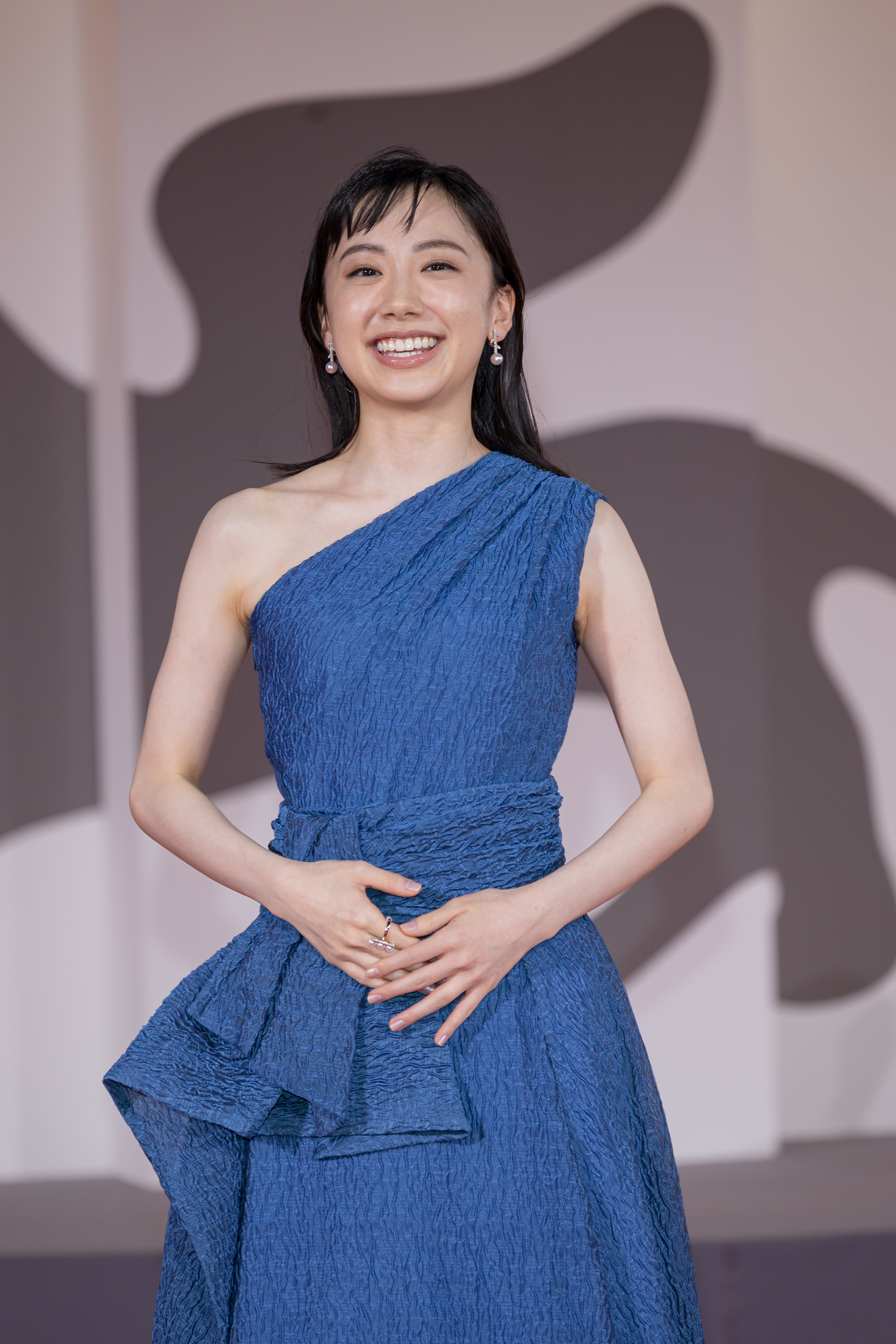
Aoi Yūki (left) and Emi Lo (middle) who voice Maomao in Japanese and English, respectively. Mana Ashida (right) will portray her in the live-action.

Maomao is voiced by Aoi Yūki in the drama CD and anime adaptations and Emi Lo in the English dub of the anime. Yūki said Maomao does not appear to show notable growth in the anime due to her tendency to observe others and later loosen up.

Yūki initially expected to follow the emotionless characterization of the already established drama CD, but the different plot and focus of the anime required her to take on a new approach to the character. Regarding the anime version of Maomao, Yuki said, "the character design is cute, so I balanced it by removing a little sweetness." Naganuma commented on Yūki's acting, "Yūki has a very high level of understanding and adaptability to the story. If it's an anime, she will properly adapt to the new approach of the anime. I feel that her response to direction is outstanding." Yūki describes her work as a harem but was surprised by Takeo Ōtsuka's work as Jinshi. Lo was grateful to take on Maomao's role, seeing her as fun and at the same time relatable.

Mana Ashida is set to portray Maomao in the 2028 live-action series adaptation.

== Role in The Apothecary Diaries ==
Maomao is the adoptive daughter of an apothecary living on the outskirts of the red light district in the capital of the fictional country of Li. She provides her services to a high-class brothel called The Verdigris House and its courtesans. She has black hair, is short and skinny, and draws freckles on her face in order to avoid attention. She is described as average by other characters.

After being kidnapped by bandits, Maomao is sold as a servant in the Imperial Palace, where she is a launderer. When she learns that two of the Emperor's concubines and their infant children are ill, she decides to investigate the matter in order to cure them. Thanks to her knowledge of poisons, medicine, plants, and basic chemistry, Maomao becomes an unofficial forensic pathologist for the inner court, in addition to becoming a lady-in-waiting and poison taste-tester for one of the Emperor's concubines she helped. She is able to obtain this position because the inner court's overseer Jinshi notices her talents despite her best efforts to hide it. Maomao often helps him solve whatever mystery he brings to her attention, and he starts to develop feelings for her as they get to know each other's true selves.

Maomao's mother is revealed to be Fengxian, a former courtesan who suffers from syphilis, who is under the medical care of her adoptive father Luomen. Maomao's biological father is the high military strategist Kan Lakan. Maomao is estranged from both her parents, having only grown up with Luomen. At one point, Lakan is challenged by Maomao to a game of Xianqi, asking that she live with him should he win, but having to buy out a courtesan from the Verdigris House should Maomao win. Lakan is defeated and, upon discovering that Fengxian is alive, chooses her to buy out and marry her.

While working as a poison taster, Maomao becomes friends with the consort she is serving, Gyokuyou, as well as her ladies-in-waiting. She also befriends fellow laundry maids Xiaolan and Shisui, who she spends time gossiping with.

Maomao continues solving mysteries in the palace, even drawing the attention of the Emperor himself. She often questions Jinshi's true identity, but decides not to ponder the question in order to keep a low profile. When Jinshi takes Maomao to a hunting trip in the northern province, the two are attacked by an unknown assassin. She accidentally discovers that Jinshi is not an actual eunuch, but she refuses to hear him out when he tries to reveal her the truth.

Upon unraveling a big scheme going on at court involving a court lady named Suirei, Maomao is kidnapped and taken to the Shi clan's fortress as a hostage, suspecting that she was taken as leverage for her father Lakan to attack. Jinshi, as the Imperial brother, leads the rebellion against the Shi clan and rescues Maomao, who finally learns his true identity.

Later, Maomao becomes an apprentice physician at court. Across the series, Maomao slowly starts reciprocating Jinshi's feelings, while he openly admits to pursuing her.

Besides several adaptations based on The Apothecary Diaries, Maomao has been featured alongside Jinshi in a series of animated shorts dealing with gags.

== Reception ==
=== Popularity ===
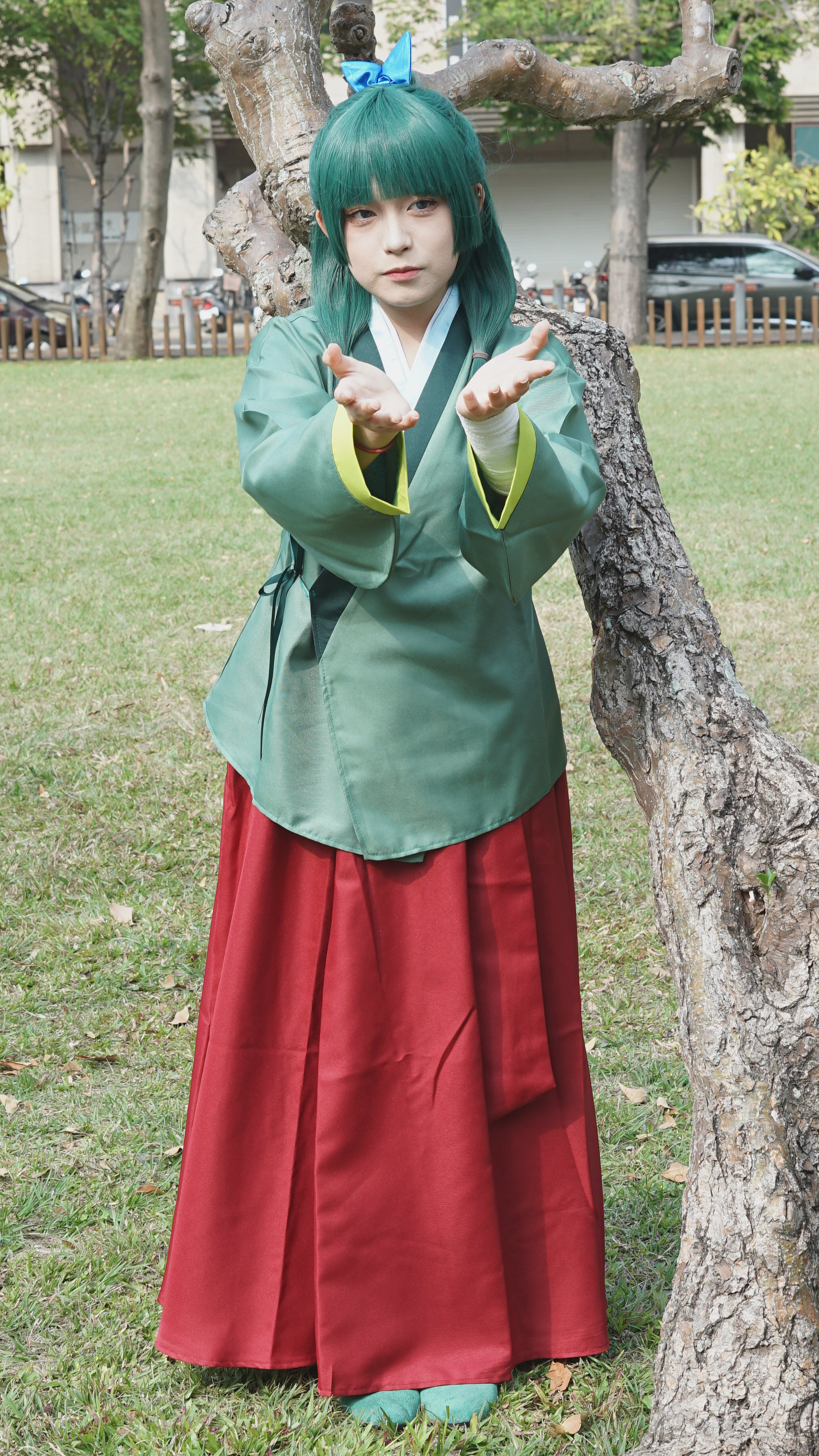
Maomao has been a popular character among cosplayers.

In the 2024 Readers' Choice Awards from the website Anime News Network, Maomao won the category "Leading Woman of the Year" with the writer noting her victory was impressive as highly surpassed other famous female characters like Momo Ayase from Dandadan or Kumiko Omae from Sound! Euphonium. In the 2024 Anime Grand Prix, Maomao took fifth place in the Best Character category, eventually won in the following year while Aoi Yūki was awarded Best Voice Actor for her performance as Maomao. In February 2024, Maomao's image received an endorsement by the Japanese government appearing on the front cover of its public relations magazine featuring an interview with her voice actress. Merchandise based on Maomao and Jinshi's looks was produced.

Maomao placed third in Anime Corner's "Best Girl of 2023 Ranking" garnering 6.22% of the votes, she also placed third in Anime Corner's "Best Female Character of the Year Ranking" for 2024 garnering 8.55% of the votes. She went on to win in the same award for 2025 garnering 13.55% of the votes. At the 9th Crunchyroll Anime Awards, Maomao was nominated for "Best Main Character". Three of Maomao's international voice actors were nominated for the "Best Voice Artist Performance" category, namely Aoi Yūki (Japanese), Gigi Patta (Portuguese), and Desireé González (Spanish); Yūki won the award, while Patta and González lost to Charles Emmanuel's Sung Jin-woo and Miguel Ángel Leal's Eren Jaeger, respectively. At the 10th edition, Maomao won "Best Main Character" and was nominated for "Must Protect at All Costs" Character. Five of Maomao's international voice actors have been nominated for "Best Voice Artist Performance", namely Aoi Yūki (Japanese), Emi Lo (English), Gigi Patta (Portuguese), Luna Fogu (Italian), and Desireé González (Spanish); Yūki won the award again, while Lo, Patta, González, and Fogu lost to Lucien Dodge, Charles Emmanuel, and Jose Antonio Toledano's Akaza, and Mosè Singh's Denji respectively.

=== Critical response ===
Critical response to Maomao's character has been positive. Collider compared Maomao's cases and relationship with Jinshi to K-dramas due to how they often involve cases of medicine with a high level of detail and how different is the latter's relationship from other women. The writer added "Maomao is a brilliant protagonist who is instantly loveable from her passion for apothecary and nosy brain." praising the evolution of her relationship with Jinshi and how the second season of the anime can build on this after seeing previews. Polygon was pleased with Maomao's portrayal in the anime's second season as she shows a distinctive intelligence to solve cases each episode provide her with notable knowledge of the world. She compared her cases with political and medical dramas. Nevertheless, she provides an entertaining premise for not wanting to change the status quo while working which appealed to Collider. IGN said most of the series' entertainment comes from how Maomao reacts to the characters' facades as well as her hostile and playful interactions with Jinshi. The Mary Sue regarded Maomao as an effective unreliable narrator considering the audience does not know the protagonist's connections with her parents which are revealed at the end of the first season and at the same time it helps to develop and show the depth of these characters thanks to the twist.

Screen Rant made an article titled "The Apothecary Diaries Marks Anime's Best Forbidden Romance in Ages" which addressed the multiple barriers that separate the two leads despite their close relationship as such as the society's rules which adds tension to the character as Maomao has to follow every rule. The subtle way the romance is portrayed also applied to the writer due to Jinshi's playful behavior and how Maomao reacts by analysing him, noticing an apparent facade. Game Rant in particular said that Maomao's characterization is a major departure from common tropes and cliches seen in anime as she shows a unique skill when solving cases as well as a strong resolve. He referred to her relationship with Jinshi as "nothing short of brilliant" as they balance each other due to their notable traits subtle moments that help slowly develop their bond. In retrospect, Polygon said the relationship was also entertaining, considering the true nature behind their casual interactions as they constantly hide secrets from each other.

Reuben Baron from Anime News Network regarded Maomao as one of the best characters from 2025, praising here portrayal as a female leading character, praising the comedy she is often given as well as the vocal performance by Aoi Yuki. Her role in the second season stood out for the chaos that happened to her as a result of being related with Shisui and how the Palace fought for her. As a result, the writer hoped Maomao could return in appealing situations in the upcoming seasons and movie. The scene where Maomao grabs Jinshi's crotch under the belief it was a frog was also praised as one of the best moments in anime from the same year for the unusual mix of sexual tension and comedy while also changing the dynamic between this two characters in the process.
