= Kaiji Tang =

Chinese voice actor (born 1984)

- 唐凱吉
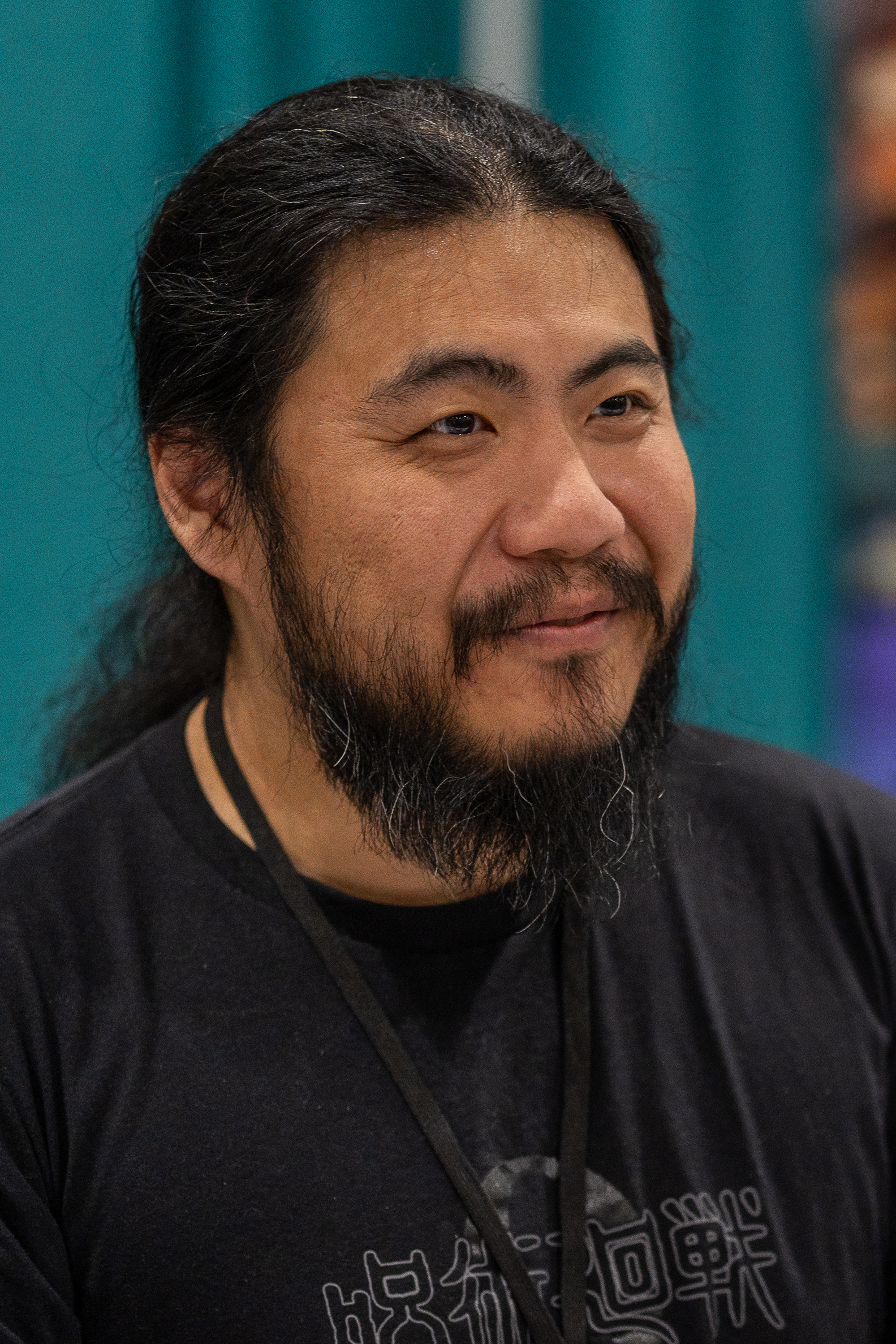
- Tang at Animate! Raleigh in 2026
- Born: January 25, 1984 (age 42); Shanghai, China
- Education: University of California, Riverside (BFA)
- Occupation: Voice actor
- Years active: 2004–present
- Spouse: Marcy Edwards (m. 2017)

Chinese name
- Simplified Chinese: 唐凯吉
- Traditional Chinese: 唐凱吉
Transcriptions
Standard Mandarin
- Hanyu Pinyin: Táng Kǎijí
- Bopomofo: ㄊㄤˊ ㄎㄞˇ ㄐㄧˊ
- Gwoyeu Romatzyh: Tarng Kaejyi
- Wade–Giles: T'ang² K'ai³-chi²
- IPA: [tʰǎŋ kʰàɪ.tɕǐ]
Yue: Cantonese
- Yale Romanization: Tòhng Hói-gāt
- Jyutping: Tong^{4} Hoi^{2}-gat^{1}
- IPA: [tʰɔŋ˩ hɔj˧˥.kɐt̚˥]

Kaiji Tang (/ˈkeɪdʒi/ KAY-jee) (Chinese: 唐凱吉; born January 25, 1984), also known as Kaiji Von Tang, is a Chinese voice actor who is based in Los Angeles, California.

== Biography ==
Tang graduated from the University of California, Riverside with a degree in theatre. He comes from a theatrical background and moved to Los Angeles in 2007 to do commercial work. He starred in commercials for Garmin GPS and The Discovery Channel. After appearing in a cult-classic movie called Zombie Strippers as a zombie, he auditioned for a podcast for a dubbing studio and was eventually hired. Ever since then, he has found success in finding roles for anime and video game characters. Tang has stated that he never set out to do voice work and it all came later on in his life. Tang enjoys his profession and likes contributing to the video game industry as he compares video games to novels. Tang hosts the YouTube channel Voices of Gaming.

== Career ==
In anime, Tang is known as the voice of Osamu Dazai from Bungo Stray Dogs, Big G from Doraemon, Satoru Gojo from Jujutsu Kaisen, Sanemi Shinazugawa from Demon Slayer: Kimetsu no Yaiba, Koji Kashin from Boruto: Naruto Next Generations, Hendrickson from The Seven Deadly Sins, Guts from Berserk, Tsumugu Kinagase from Kill La Kill, Tetsudo "Poppo" Hisakawa from Anohana: The Flower We Saw That Day, Archer from Fate/stay night: Unlimited Blade Works, Jinshi from The Apothecary Diaries, Joe from Megalo Box, Jin Kazama, lead character in Tekken: Bloodline, and Gyro Zeppeli in the Steel Ball Run: JoJo's Bizarre Adventure. In video games, he is known for his performances as Wingul from Tales of Xillia, Fang from Fairy Fencer F, Gaius Worzel from The Legend of Heroes: Trails of Cold Steel series, Yasuhiro Hagakure and Gonta Gokuhara from the Danganronpa series, and Ichiban Kasuga in the Yakuza series.

He is also known for voicing Owain/Odin in the Fire Emblem series, as well as the titular character in the video game Detective Pikachu and voiced Tom Cat in the 2021 film Tom & Jerry.

Satoru Gojo is Tang's most renowned and celebrated voice acting role to date. Despite this, Tang noted that among all the anime he has worked on, Jujutsu Kaisen is not his favorite, but rather the 2005 anime television series Doraemon was his favorite. In a 2023 interview with Anime Corner, Tang claimed that his first human memory is of reading a Doraemon comic; thus, obtaining a role and participating in the show later in life felt like "an amazing full circle moment."

=== Industry commentary ===
On his off time, he posts content on TikTok and Twitter. Tang is known for being very open about his career and what he hopes for. On March 28, 2022, one industry insider estimated that the English dub performers for anime received US salaries between $150 and $600 for their work. Tang made fun of the scenario by noting that this figure is hourly yet cumulative. Tang continued to express his own ambitions for the dub industry in another tweet, beyond pay increases. According to him, longer lead times before entering the recording booth will be necessary for stronger dubs. Cold-reading is difficult for any actor, and dubbing uses it frequently. Tang admitted that, despite portraying one of the most well-known characters in one of the most well-known anime series in the world, he is only able to support himself by engaging in voice acting work outside of the anime industry, such as performing 12–20 hours of audio descriptive work each week in addition to providing voice overs for audio books and educational programs.

== Personal life ==
He married voice actress Marcy Edwards on June 24, 2017. He has a sister named Katherine.

== Filmography ==
=== Films ===
List of voice performances in films
Year	Title	Role	Notes	Source
2011	Tekken: Blood Vengeance	Lee Chaolan		
2012	Battle Royale	Shogo Kawada		
2018	Fate/stay night: Heaven's Feel I. presage flower	Archer		
2019	Fate/stay night: Heaven's Feel II. lost butterfly	Archer		
2019	White Snake	Chang Pan		
2020	Altered Carbon: Resleeved	Shinji		
2020	Willy and the Guardians of the Lake	Barry Bladderwort	US version	
2020	Digimon Adventure: Last Evolution Kizuna	Kyotaro Yamada		
2021	Tom & Jerry	Tom Cat	Additional vocal effects	
2021	Case Closed: The Fist of Blue Sapphire	Eugene Lim		
2021	Fate/stay night: Heaven's Feel III. spring song	Archer		
2021	Demon Slayer: Kimetsu no Yaiba – The Movie: Mugen Train	Sanemi Shinazugawa		
2022	Jujutsu Kaisen 0	Satoru Gojo		
2022–23	The Seven Deadly Sins: Grudge of Edinburgh	Hendrickson	Parts 1 & 2	
2023	The Monkey King	Old Man Villager		
2023	Fist of the North Star: The Legend of Yuria	Jagi	OVA	

=== Video games ===
List of voice performances in video games
Year	Title	Role	Notes	Source
2008	BlazBlue: Calamity Trigger	Researcher, Bounty Hunter		
2009	Grand Chase	Jin Kaien		
2009	Kamen Rider: Dragon Knight	Thrust, Strike		
2010	Heroes of Newerth	Dark Elf Swiftblade		
2010	Sengoku Basara: Samurai Heroes	Various		
2011	Dynasty Warriors 7	Sima Zhao		
2011	Dynasty Warriors 7: Xtreme Legends	Sima Zhao		
2012	Soul Calibur V	Young Knight		
2012	Dynasty Warriors Next	Sima Zhao		
2012	Reality Fighters	Kung Fu Monk, Samurai		
2012	Tales of Graces f	Raymond Oswell		
2012	Skullgirls	Black Egrets Soldier, Double, Brain Drain		
2012	Tekken Tag Tournament 2	Lee Chaolan (as Violet)	Character Intro and Ending Dialogues	
2012	Dead or Alive 5	Jann Lee		
2012	Resident Evil 6	Screamer Zombie		
2012	MapleStory	Male Luminous		
2013	Fire Emblem Awakening	Owain		
2013	Dynasty Warriors 8	Sima Zhao		
2013	Tales of Xillia	Wingul		
2014	Smite	Ao Kuang		
2014	Bravely Default	Doctor Qada		
2014	Danganronpa: Trigger Happy Havoc	Yasuhiro Hagakure		
2014	Fairy Fencer F	Fang		
2014	Guilty Gear Xrd -SIGN-	Faust		
2014	Devil Survivor 2: Record Breaker	Yamato Hotsuin		
2015	Disgaea 5: Alliance of Vengeance	Red Magnus		
2015	Skullgirls 2nd Encore	Brain Drain, Black Egrets Soldier, Yu-Wan, Politician Double, Andy Anvil, Lawrence, Grendel		
2015	Xenoblade Chronicles X	Yelv		
2015	The Legend of Heroes: Trails of Cold Steel	Gaius Worzel		
2016	The Legend of Heroes: Trails of Cold Steel II	Gaius Worzel		
2016	Fire Emblem Fates	Odin (Owain), Shiro, Ignatius		
2016	Killing Floor 2	Hayato Tanaka		
2017	Danganronpa V3: Killing Harmony	Gonta Gokuhara, Yasuhiro Hagakure		
2017	Fire Emblem Heroes	Odin, Narcian, Lloyd, Shiro		
2017	Akiba's Beat	Kasuga Yuuki		
2017	Persona 5	Munehisa Iwai		
2018	Detective Pikachu	Detective Pikachu		
2018	Fallout 76	Male Player Character, Brody Torrance, Jeff Nakamura, Additional Voices		
2019	Pokémon Masters	Noland, Hiker, Pokéfan		
2019	AI: The Somnium Files	Moma Kumakura		
2019	The Legend of Heroes: Trails of Cold Steel III	Gaius Worzel		
2019	Dead or Alive 6	Jann Lee		
2019	BlazBlue: Cross Tag Battle	Akatsuki		
2019	Grand Chase Dimensional Chaser	Jin Kaien, Mecha Rocco		
2019	Judgment	Sakuraba		
2019	River City Girls	Riki		
2019	Daemon X Machina	Nameless		
2019	Code Vein	Male player character voice 3		
2020	Persona 5 Royal	Munehisa Iwai		
2020	The Legend of Heroes: Trails of Cold Steel IV	Gaius Worzel		
2020	Granblue Fantasy Versus	Eustace		
2020	Yakuza: Like a Dragon	Ichiban Kasuga		
2020	13 Sentinels: Aegis Rim	Takatoshi Hijiyama		
2021	Re:Zero -Starting Life in Another World-: The Prophecy of the Throne	Salum Pristis		
2021	Guilty Gear -STRIVE-	Faust, Daryl		
2021	Demon Slayer: Kimetsu no Yaiba – The Hinokami Chronicles	Sanemi Shinazugawa		
2021	Marvel Super War	Shang-Chi		
2021	Mary Skelter Finale	Haru		
2021	Lost Judgment	Kaito Sakakiba		
2022	Rune Factory 5	Murakumo		
2022	Deadcraft	Gene		
2022	AI: The Somnium Files – Nirvana Initiative	Moma Kumakura		
2022	Tower of Fantasy	Tian Lang		
2022	We Are OFK	Wedge, eSports Announcer Ricko, Bad DJ		
2022	Ghostbusters: Spirits Unleashed	Ghostbuster		
2022	Relayer	Additional voices		
2022	Call of Duty: Modern Warfare II	Zhiqiang "Zimo" Wong		
2022	Star Ocean: The Divine Force	Curtis Aldridge		
2022	River City Girls 2	Riki, Glen, Gouda		
2023	Octopath Traveler II	Additional voices		
2023	Advance Wars 1+2: Re-Boot Camp	Kanbei		
2023	Street Fighter 6	Carlos Miyamoto		
2023	Master Detective Archives: Rain Code	Yakou Furio		
2023	The Legend of Heroes: Trails into Reverie	Gaius Worzel		
2023	Mortal Kombat 1	Bi-Han (Sub-Zero / Noob Saibot)		
2023	Detective Pikachu Returns	Detective Pikachu, Harry Goodman		
2023	Anonymous;Code	Ewan Okuda		
2023	Naruto x Boruto: Ultimate Ninja Storm Connections	Koji Kashin		
2023	Like a Dragon Gaiden: The Man Who Erased His Name	Ichiban Kasuga		
2023	Granblue Fantasy Versus: Rising	Eustace, Goblin, Joy		
2024	Like a Dragon: Infinite Wealth	Ichiban Kasuga		
2024	Granblue Fantasy: Relink	Additional voices		
2024	Jujutsu Kaisen: Cursed Clash	Satoru Gojo		
2024	Unicorn Overlord	Mercenaries (Type E), additional voices		
2024	Contra: Operation Galuga	Brad Fang		
2024	The Legend of Heroes: Trails Through Daybreak	Cao Lee, citizens		
2024	Romancing SaGa 2: Revenge of the Seven	Karl/Martial Artist		
2025	Dynasty Warriors: Origins	Gan Ning, Chen Gong		
2025	The Legend of Heroes: Trails Through Daybreak II	Cao Lee, citizens		
2025	Like a Dragon: Pirate Yakuza in Hawaii	Ichiban Kasuga		
2025	Xenoblade Chronicles X: Definitive Edition	Yelv, Ma-Non E, additional voices		
2025	Yakuza 0 Director's Cut	Akira Nishikiyama		
2026	Yakuza Kiwami 3 & Dark Ties	Ichiban Kasuga		

=== Live action ===
List of acting performances in film and television
Year	Title	Role	Notes	Source
2008	Zombie Strippers!	Zombie	First Hollywood acting role	

=== Webseries ===
List of acting performances in webseries
Year	Title	Role	Notes	Source
2016	Death Battle	Roronoa Zoro / Samurai Jack / Aquaman / All Might	Episodes: "Roronoa Zoro VS Erza Scarlet", "Samurai Jack VS Afro Samurai", "Aquaman VS Namor", All Might VS "Might Guy"	
2017	RWBY	Li Ren	Volume 4, Chapter 10: "Kuroyuri"	

=== Animation ===
List of voice performances in animation
Year	Title	Role	Notes	Source
2024	Jentry Chau vs. the Underworld	Ox Face		

=== Anime ===
List of voice performances in anime
Year	Title	Role	Notes	Source
2007	The Melancholy of Haruhi Suzumiya	Computer Club Member		
2008	Tweeny Witches	Warlock Officer		
2008	Kite Liberator	Sputnik		
2008	The Familiar of Zero	Jean Colbert, Derflinger		
2009	Magical Girl Lyrical Nanoha	Shiro Takamachi		
2009	Magical Girl Lyrical Nanoha A's	Shiro Takamachi, Graf Eisen		
2013	Sword Art Online	Schmitt		
2013	Nura: Rise of the Yokai Clan	Akifusa Keikain		
2014–15	Magi: The Labyrinth of Magic series	Ren Koen	Also Kingdom	
2014–15	Doraemon	Big G		
2014–15	Kill la Kill	Tsumugu Kinagase	Also OVA	
2015	Coppelion	Taro		
2015	Fate/stay night: Unlimited Blade Works	Archer	TV series	
2015	JoJo's Bizarre Adventure	Santana		
2015–21	The Seven Deadly Sins	Hendrickson, Pelio's Father		
2016	One-Punch Man	Armored Gorilla, Subterraneans (ep 1)		
2016	Charlotte	Hosoyamada		
2016	Danganronpa 3: The End of Hope's Peak High School	Koichi Kizakura		
2016-17	Naruto: Shippuden	Tenma Izumo, Gengo		
2017	Dragon Ball Super	Vegeta	Bang Zoom! Entertainment dub	
2017	Berserk	Guts	2016 series	
2017	Anohana: The Flower We Saw That Day	Tetsudo "Poppo" Hisakawa		
2017	Fate/Grand Order: First Order	Archer		
2018	Hunter × Hunter (2011 TV series)	Koala		
2018	Katsugeki/Touken Ranbu	Odenta Mitsuyo		
2018–20	Baki	Retsu	Netflix ONA	
2018–23	Bungo Stray Dogs	Osamu Dazai		
2018	Skip Beat!	Matsushima, "Love Me" male voice		
2018	Back Street Girls: Gokudolls	Kentaro		
2018–21	Megalobox	Joe		
2019	Kengan Ashura	Tokita Ohma		
2020	Beastars	Bill		
2020	Dorohedoro	Aikawa		
2020	Demon Slayer: Kimetsu no Yaiba	Sanemi Shinazugawa		
2020	Drifting Dragons	Gaga		
2020	The God of High School	Taek Jegal		
2020–present	Jujutsu Kaisen	Satoru Gojo		
2021	Kuroko's Basketball	Tsutomu Iwamura, Hideki Ishida		
2021	Beyblade Burst Surge	Narrator, Noboru Hizashi		
2021	Vivy: Fluorite Eye's Song	Yugo Kakitani		
2021	Yashahime: Princess Half-Demon	Sakasa		
2021	Record of Ragnarok	Lü Bu		
2021–23	Vinland Saga	Halfdan, Atli, Fox, Drott	Netflix dub	
2021	Magatsu Wahrheit Zuerst	Lotus Gutheil		
2021	Tokyo Revengers	Nobutaka Osanai		
2021	Battle Game in 5 Seconds	Masakado Rindo		
2021–22	Pokémon	Faba, Dozer	2 episodes	
2021	Pokémon Evolutions	Palmer	YouTube ONA	
2022	Orient	Tatsuomi/Haruhisa		
2022	Spriggan	Viktor Stolov, Iwao Akatsuki, Mjr. Bowman		
2022	The Prince of Tennis	Kippie Tachibana		
2022	Summer Time Rendering	Masahito Karikiri		
2022	Kakegurui Twin	Ren Kochi		
2022–23	Boruto: Naruto Next Generations	Koji Kashin		
2022	Tekken: Bloodline	Jin Kazama		
2023	Digimon Adventure	Kabukimon	2020 series	
2023	Mashle	Tom Knowles		
2023	Ōoku: The Inner Chambers	Abe, Ryuko		
2023	Gamera Rebirth	James Joshua Tazaki		
2023	Pluto	Thracia Minister Thomas		
2023–present	The Apothecary Diaries	Jinshi		
2024	Dandadan	Taro		
2024	The Grimm Variations	N	Lead role; Episode 4: "The Elves and the Shoemaker"	
2024	Ranma ½	Jusenkyo Guide		
2025	My Happy Marriage Season 2	Naoshi Usui		
2025	Sakamoto Days	Lu's Father		
2025	Medalist	Shinichiro Sonidori		
2026	Steel Ball Run: JoJo's Bizarre Adventure	Gyro Zeppeli		
2026	Though I Am an Inept Villainess	Ei Gyoumei		
