= Crunchyroll Anime Award for Best VA Performance =

- Awarded for: Best voice acting in an anime from the previous year
- Country: United States; Japan
- First award: 2019
- Website: Crunchyroll Anime Awards

The Crunchyroll Anime Award for Best VA Performance are awards given at the Crunchyroll Anime Awards rewarding the best voice acting performance in anime. Given annually by the anime streaming service Crunchyroll, winners are determined through a combined voting process by judges and public voting.

Since its inception at the 3rd Crunchyroll Anime Awards in 2019, it has awarded voice acting for anime in the Japanese and English language. Since then, it has included voice acting for localized dubbing of anime in other languages, including Arabic, Castilian Spanish, French, German, Italian, Latin American Spanish, Portuguese, Hindi, and Russian. The Russian category was dropped in 2023, most likely due to the suspension of Crunchyroll's services in Russia in March 2022 in the wake of the Russo-Ukrainian war.

== Winners and nominees ==
In the following list, the first names listed in gold are the winners; those not in gold are nominees, which are listed in alphabetical order. The years given are those in which the ceremonies took place.

=== Japanese ===
2010s

| Year | Recipient | Character(s) | Anime |
2018 (3rd)
| 2018 (3rd) | Mamoru Miyano | Kotaro Tatsumi | Zombie Land Saga |
| 2018 (3rd) | Megumi Han | Miki Makimura | Devilman Crybaby |
| 2018 (3rd) | Nao Tōyama | Rin Shima | Laid-Back Camp |
| 2018 (3rd) | Rareko | Retsuko | Aggretsuko |
| 2018 (3rd) | Reina Ueda | Akane Shinjo | SSSS.Gridman |
| 2018 (3rd) | Soma Saito | Honda-san | Skull-face Bookseller Honda-san |
2019 (4th)
| 2019 (4th) | Yuichi Nakamura | Bruno Bucciarati | JoJo's Bizarre Adventure: Golden Wind (season 4) |
| 2019 (4th) | Mamoru Miyano | Reo Niiboshi | Sarazanmai |
| 2019 (4th) | Saori Hayami | Shinobu Kochou | Demon Slayer: Kimetsu no Yaiba |
| 2019 (4th) | Yukino Satsuki | Ai Magase | Babylon |
| 2019 (4th) | Yūsuke Kobayashi | Senku Ishigami | Dr. Stone |
| 2019 (4th) | Yūko Kaida | Isabella | The Promised Neverland |

2020s

| Year | Recipient | Character(s) | Anime |
2020 (5th)
| 2020 (5th) | Yūsuke Kobayashi | Subaru Natsuki | Re:Zero − Starting Life in Another World (season 2) |
| 2020 (5th) | Megumi Ogata | Hanako | Toilet-Bound Hanako-kun |
| 2020 (5th) | Mutsumi Tamura | Sayaka Kanamori | Keep Your Hands Off Eizouken! |
| 2020 (5th) | Riho Sugiyama | Minare Koda | Wave, Listen to Me! |
| 2020 (5th) | Yuichi Nakamura | Satoru Gojo | Jujutsu Kaisen |
| 2020 (5th) | Yūsuke Ōnuki | Daisuke Kambe | The Millionaire Detective - Balance: UNLIMITED |
2021 (6th)
| 2021 (6th) | Yuki Kaji | Eren Jaeger | Attack on Titan: The Final Season Part 1 (season 4) |
| 2021 (6th) | Ayane Sakura | Gabi Braun | Attack on Titan: The Final Season Part 1 (season 4) |
| 2021 (6th) | Kiyoshi Kobayashi | Daisuke Jigen (ep. 0) | Lupin the 3rd Part 6 |
| 2021 (6th) | Aoi Yūki | Kumoko | So I'm a Spider, So What? |
| 2021 (6th) | Natsuki Hanae | Odokawa | Odd Taxi |
| 2021 (6th) | Kanata Aikawa | Ai Ohto | Wonder Egg Priority |
2021/2022 (7th)
| 2021/2022 (7th) | Yuki Kaji | Eren Jaeger | Attack on Titan: The Final Season Part 2 (season 4 cour 2) |
| 2021/2022 (7th) | Atsumi Tanezaki | Anya Forger | Spy × Family |
| 2021/2022 (7th) | Chika Anzai | Chisato Nishikigi | Lycoris Recoil |
| 2021/2022 (7th) | Fairouz Ai | Jolyne Cujoh | JoJo's Bizarre Adventure: Stone Ocean (season 5) |
| 2021/2022 (7th) | Misaki Kuno | Faputa | Made in Abyss: The Golden City of the Scorching Sun |
| 2021/2022 (7th) | Natsuki Hanae | Tanjiro Kamado | Demon Slayer: Kimetsu no Yaiba Entertainment District Arc (season 2 cour 2) |
2022/2023 (8th)
| 2022/2023 (8th) | Yuichi Nakamura | Satoru Gojo | Jujutsu Kaisen (season 2) |
| 2022/2023 (8th) | Atsumi Tanezaki | Anya Forger | Spy × Family (season 1 cour 2) |
| 2022/2023 (8th) | Kikunosuke Toya | Denji | Chainsaw Man |
| 2022/2023 (8th) | Mayumi Tanaka | Monkey D. Luffy | One Piece |
| 2022/2023 (8th) | Yoshino Aoyama | Hitori Gotoh | Bocchi the Rock! |
| 2022/2023 (8th) | Yuki Kaji | Eren Jaeger | Attack on Titan: The Final Season The Final Chapters Special 1 (season 4 cour 3) |
2023/2024 (9th)
| 2023/2024 (9th) | Aoi Yūki | Maomao | The Apothecary Diaries |
| 2023/2024 (9th) | Atsumi Tanezaki | Frieren | Frieren: Beyond Journey's End |
| 2023/2024 (9th) | Kenichi Suzumura | Bravern | Brave Bang Bravern! |
| 2023/2024 (9th) | Shion Wakayama | Momo Ayase | Dandadan |
| 2023/2024 (9th) | Sayaka Senbongi | Marcille Donato | Delicious in Dungeon |
| 2023/2024 (9th) | Natsuki Hanae | Ken "Okarun" Takakura | Dandadan |
2025 (10th)
| 2025 (10th) | Aoi Yūki | Maomao | The Apothecary Diaries (season 2) |
| 2025 (10th) | Chiaki Kobayashi | Yoshiki Tsujinaka | The Summer Hikaru Died |
| 2025 (10th) | Daiki Yamashita | Izuku "Deku" Midoriya | My Hero Academia: Final Season (season 8) |
| 2025 (10th) | Kikunosuke Toya | Denji | Chainsaw Man – The Movie: Reze Arc |
| 2025 (10th) | Mayumi Tanaka | Monkey D. Luffy | One Piece |
| 2025 (10th) | Reina Ueda | Reze | Chainsaw Man – The Movie: Reze Arc |

=== English ===
2010s

| Year | Recipient | Character(s) | Anime |
2018 (3rd)
| 2018 (3rd) | Christopher Sabat | All Might | My Hero Academia (season 3) |
| 2018 (3rd) | David Wald | Narrator | Mr. Tonegawa: Middle Management Blues |
| 2018 (3rd) | Erica Mendez | Retsuko | Aggretsuko |
| 2018 (3rd) | Erika Harlacher | Violet Evergarden | Violet Evergarden |
| 2018 (3rd) | Kari Wahlgren | Haruko Haruhara | FLCL Progressive (season 2) |
| 2018 (3rd) | Tia Ballard | Zero Two | Darling in the Franxx |
2019 (4th)
| 2019 (4th) | Billy Kametz | Naofumi Iwatani | The Rising of the Shield Hero |
| 2019 (4th) | Casey Mongillo | Shinji Ikari | Neon Genesis Evangelion |
| 2019 (4th) | Erica Mendez | Retsuko | Aggretsuko (season 2) |
| 2019 (4th) | Faye Mata | Aqua | KonoSuba: God's Blessing on This Wonderful World! |
| 2019 (4th) | Kyle McCarley | Shigeo "Mob" Kageyama | Mob Psycho 100 II (season 2) |
| 2019 (4th) | Laura Bailey | Tohru Honda | Fruits Basket |

2020s

| Year | Recipient | Character(s) | Anime |
2020 (5th)
| 2020 (5th) | Zeno Robinson | Hawks | My Hero Academia (season 4) |
| 2020 (5th) | Aaron Phillips | Laurent Thierry | Great Pretender |
| 2020 (5th) | Anairis Quiñones | Echidna | Re:Zero − Starting Life in Another World (season 2) |
| 2020 (5th) | Crispin Freeman | Ziusudra | Fate/Grand Order - Absolute Demonic Front: Babylonia |
| 2020 (5th) | Johnny Yong Bosch | Bam | Tower of God |
| 2020 (5th) | Jonah Scott | Legoshi | Beastars |
2021 (6th)
| 2021 (6th) | David Wald | Ainosuke Shindo | SK8 the Infinity |
| 2021 (6th) | Brittany Cox | Fena | Fena: Pirate Princess |
| 2021 (6th) | Laura Bailey | Tohru Honda | Fruits Basket The Final Season (season 3) |
| 2021 (6th) | Adam McArthur | Yuji Itadori | Jujutsu Kaisen (cour 2) |
| 2021 (6th) | Matt Shipman | Reki Kyan | SK8 the Infinity |
| 2021 (6th) | Anairis Quiñones | Rika Kawai | Wonder Egg Priority |
2021/2022 (7th)
| 2021/2022 (7th) | Zach Aguilar | David Martinez | Cyberpunk: Edgerunners |
| 2021/2022 (7th) | Amanda Lee | Marin Kitagawa | My Dress-Up Darling |
| 2021/2022 (7th) | Cherami Leigh | Kotaro Satō | Kotaro Lives Alone |
| 2021/2022 (7th) | Natalie Van Sistine | Yor Forger | Spy × Family |
| 2021/2022 (7th) | SungWon Cho | Kage | Ranking of Kings |
| 2021/2022 (7th) | Zeno Robinson | Gamma 2 | Dragon Ball Super: Super Hero |
2022/2023 (8th)
| 2022/2023 (8th) | Ryan Colt Levy | Denji | Chainsaw Man |
| 2022/2023 (8th) | Abby Trott | Nezuko Kamado | Demon Slayer: Kimetsu no Yaiba Swordsmith Village Arc (season 3) |
| 2022/2023 (8th) | Austin Tindle | Millions Knives | Trigun Stampede |
| 2022/2023 (8th) | Johnny Yong Bosch | Ichigo Kurosaki | Bleach: Thousand-Year Blood War |
| 2022/2023 (8th) | Lexi Nieto | Tomo Aizawa | Tomo-chan Is a Girl! |
| 2022/2023 (8th) | Marisa Duran | Sagiri Yamada Asaemon | Hell's Paradise |
2023/2024 (9th)
| 2023/2024 (9th) | Aleks Le | Sung Jin-woo | Solo Leveling |
| 2023/2024 (9th) | A.J. Beckles | Ken "Okarun" Takakura | Dandadan |
| 2023/2024 (9th) | Jessie James Grelle | Armin Arlert | Attack on Titan: The Final Season The Final Chapters Special 2 (season 4 cour 4) |
| 2023/2024 (9th) | Mallorie Rodak | Frieren | Frieren: Beyond Journey's End |
| 2023/2024 (9th) | Sarah Natochenny | Alisa Mikhailovna "Alya" Kujou | Alya Sometimes Hides Her Feelings in Russian |
| 2023/2024 (9th) | SungWon Cho | Senshi | Delicious in Dungeon |
2025 (10th)
| 2025 (10th) | Lucien Dodge | Akaza | Demon Slayer: Kimetsu no Yaiba – The Movie: Infinity Castle |
| 2025 (10th) | Alexis Tipton | Reze | Chainsaw Man – The Movie: Reze Arc |
| 2025 (10th) | Emi Lo | Maomao | The Apothecary Diaries (season 2) |
| 2025 (10th) | Justin Briner | Izuku "Deku" Midoriya | My Hero Academia: Final Season (season 8) |
| 2025 (10th) | Morgan Berry | Shiori Fuyumura | Sanda |
| 2025 (10th) | Paul Castro Jr. | Hikaru Indo | The Summer Hikaru Died |

=== Castilian Spanish ===
2020s

| Year | Recipient | Character(s) | Anime |
2021 (6th)
| 2021 (6th) | Marcel Navarro | Tanjiro Kamado | Demon Slayer: Kimetsu no Yaiba – The Movie: Mugen Train |
| 2021 (6th) | Bianca Rada | Tai Yagami | Digimon Adventure: Last Evolution Kizuna |
| 2021 (6th) | Albert Trifol Segarra | Shinji Ikari | Evangelion 3.0+1.0 Thrice Upon a Time |
| 2021 (6th) | Adelaida López | Usagi Tsukino | Sailor Moon Eternal |
| 2021 (6th) | Blanca Hualde (Neri) | Brunhilde | Record of Ragnarok |
| 2021 (6th) | Marc Zanni | Tatsu | The Way of the Househusband |
2021/2022 (7th)
| 2021/2022 (7th) | Jaime Pérez de Sevilla | Yuta Okkotsu | Jujutsu Kaisen 0 |
| 2021/2022 (7th) | Lourdes Fabrés | Jolyne Cujoh | JoJo's Bizarre Adventure: Stone Ocean (season 5) |
| 2021/2022 (7th) | Alejandro Albaiceta | Gohan | Dragon Ball Super: Super Hero |
| 2021/2022 (7th) | Marc Gómez | Daida | Ranking of Kings (cour 1) |
| 2021/2022 (7th) | Masumi Mutsuda | Yatora Yaguchi | Blue Period |
| 2021/2022 (7th) | Mónica Padrós | Hiling | Ranking of Kings (cour 1) |
2022/2023 (8th)
| 2022/2023 (8th) | Joel Gómez Jiménez | Denji | Chainsaw Man |
| 2022/2023 (8th) | David Brau | Senku Ishigami | Dr. Stone: New World (season 3) |
| 2022/2023 (8th) | David Flores | Dot Barrett | Mashle: Magic and Muscles |
| 2022/2023 (8th) | Majo Montesinos Guzmán | Anya Forger | Spy × Family (season 1 cour 2) |
| 2022/2023 (8th) | María Luisa Marciel | Power | Chainsaw Man |
| 2022/2023 (8th) | Marta Moreno | Uta | One Piece Film: Red |
2023/2024 (9th)
| 2023/2024 (9th) | Masumi Mutsuda | Sung Jin-woo | Solo Leveling |
| 2023/2024 (9th) | Ainhoa Maiquez | Miyo Saimori | My Happy Marriage |
| 2023/2024 (9th) | Clara Schwarze | Akane Tendo | Ranma ½ |
| 2023/2024 (9th) | Jorge Peña | Senshi | Delicious in Dungeon |
| 2023/2024 (9th) | Mario Ballart | Kafka Hibino | Kaiju No. 8 |
| 2023/2024 (9th) | Sandra Villa | Frieren | Frieren: Beyond Journey's End |
2025 (10th)
| 2025 (10th) | Carles Teruel | Akaza | Demon Slayer: Kimetsu no Yaiba – The Movie: Infinity Castle |
| 2025 (10th) | Adrián Pineda | Rudo Surebrec | Gachiakuta |
| 2025 (10th) | Cristina Peña | Reze | Chainsaw Man – The Movie: Reze Arc |
| 2025 (10th) | Joel Gómez Jiménez | Ken "Okarun" Takakura | Dandadan (season 2) |
| 2025 (10th) | Marisa Marciel | Nami | One Piece |
| 2025 (10th) | Marta Barbará | Kaoruko Waguri | The Fragrant Flower Blooms with Dignity |

=== French ===
2020s

| Year | Recipient | Character(s) | Anime |
2021 (6th)
| 2021 (6th) | Enzo Ratsito | Tanjiro Kamado | Demon Slayer: Kimetsu no Yaiba Mugen Train Arc (season 2) |
| 2021 (6th) | Mark Lesser | Satoru Gojo | Jujutsu Kaisen (cour 2) |
| 2021 (6th) | Alexis Tomassian | Kage | Ranking of Kings |
| 2021 (6th) | Brieuc Lemaire | Vanitas | The Case Study of Vanitas |
| 2021 (6th) | Nancy Philippot | Raphtalia | The Rising of the Shield Hero |
| 2021 (6th) | Olivier Premel | Takemichi Hanagaki | Tokyo Revengers |
2021/2022 (7th)
| 2021/2022 (7th) | Brigitte Lecordier | Bojji | Ranking of Kings (cour 2) |
| 2021/2022 (7th) | Alexis Tomassian | Kage | Ranking of Kings (cour 2) |
| 2021/2022 (7th) | Dorothée Pousséo | Lucy | Cyberpunk: Edgerunners |
| 2021/2022 (7th) | Geneviève Doang | Vladilena Milizé | 86 |
| 2021/2022 (7th) | Laure Filiu | Jolyne Cujoh | JoJo's Bizarre Adventure: Stone Ocean (season 5) |
| 2021/2022 (7th) | Martin Faliu | Miyuki Shirogane | Kaguya-sama: Love Is War – Ultra Romantic (season 3) |
2022/2023 (8th)
| 2022/2023 (8th) | Martial Le Minoux | Suguru Geto | Jujutsu Kaisen (season 2) |
| 2022/2023 (8th) | Levanah Solomon | Suzume Iwato | Suzume |
| 2022/2023 (8th) | Lilly Caruso | Aqua | KonoSuba: God's Blessing on This Wonderful World! |
| 2022/2023 (8th) | Martin Faliu | Aqua | Oshi no Ko |
| 2022/2023 (8th) | Yoan Sover | Gabimaru | Hell's Paradise |
| 2022/2023 (8th) | Zina Khakhoulia | Power | Chainsaw Man |
2023/2024 (9th)
| 2023/2024 (9th) | Adrien Antoine | Kafka Hibino | Kaiju No. 8 |
| 2023/2024 (9th) | Audrey Sablé | Naomi Orthmann | Metallic Rouge |
| 2023/2024 (9th) | Jaynelia Coadou | Momo Ayase | Dandadan |
| 2023/2024 (9th) | Julien Allouf | Jinshi | The Apothecary Diaries |
| 2023/2024 (9th) | Marie Nonnenmacher | Frieren | Frieren: Beyond Journey's End |
| 2023/2024 (9th) | Martin Faliu | Ranma Saotome | Ranma ½ |
2025 (10th)
| 2025 (10th) | Bastien Bourlé | Izuku "Deku" Midoriya | My Hero Academia: Final Season (season 8) |
| 2025 (10th) | Bruno Mullenaerts | Enjin | Gachiakuta |
| 2025 (10th) | Catherine Hanotiau | Nico Wakatsuki | Witch Watch |
| 2025 (10th) | Clara Soares | Reze | Chainsaw Man – The Movie: Reze Arc |
| 2025 (10th) | Jonathan Gimbord | Hikaru Indo | The Summer Hikaru Died |
| 2025 (10th) | Véronique Augereau | Seiko Ayase | Dandadan (season 2) |

=== German ===
2020s

| Year | Recipient | Character(s) | Anime |
2021 (6th)
| 2021 (6th) | René Dawn-Claude | Satoru Gojo | Jujutsu Kaisen (cour 2) |
| 2021 (6th) | Florian Knorn | Tai Yagami | Digimon Adventure: Last Evolution Kizuna |
| 2021 (6th) | Rieke Werner | Sakura Matou | Fate/stay night: Heaven's Feel III. spring song |
| 2021 (6th) | Marios Gavrilis | Dio Brando | JoJo's Bizarre Adventure: Phantom Blood |
| 2021 (6th) | Tommy Morgenstern | Galo Thymos | Promare |
| 2021 (6th) | Torsten Münchow | The Count of Monte Cristo | Gankutsuou: The Count of Monte Cristo |
2021/2022 (7th)
| 2021/2022 (7th) | Nicolás Artajo | Yuta Okkotsu | Jujutsu Kaisen 0 |
| 2021/2022 (7th) | Gabrielle Pietermann | Marin Kitagawa | My Dress-Up Darling |
| 2021/2022 (7th) | Jannik Endemann | Ritsuka Uenoyama | Given |
| 2021/2022 (7th) | Lara Trautmann | Belle | Belle |
| 2021/2022 (7th) | Torsten Michaelis | Askeladd | Vinland Saga (season 1) |
| 2021/2022 (7th) | Uwe Thomsen | Jotaro Kujo | JoJo's Bizarre Adventure: Diamond Is Unbreakable (season 3) |
2022/2023 (8th)
| 2022/2023 (8th) | Franziska Trunte | Power | Chainsaw Man |
| 2022/2023 (8th) | Emilia Raschewski | Suzume Iwato | Suzume |
| 2022/2023 (8th) | Franciska Friede | Chise Hatori | The Ancient Magus' Bride |
| 2022/2023 (8th) | Pascal Breuer | Arataka Reigen | Mob Psycho 100 III (season 3) |
| 2022/2023 (8th) | Patrich Baehr | Gen Asagiri | Dr. Stone: New World (season 3) |
| 2022/2023 (8th) | Patrick Keller | Akira Tendo | Zom 100: Bucket List of the Dead |
2023/2024 (9th)
| 2023/2024 (9th) | Daniel Schlauch | Monkey D. Luffy | One Piece |
| 2023/2024 (9th) | Felix Kamin | Kafka Hibino | Kaiju No. 8 |
| 2023/2024 (9th) | Florian Knorn | Ranma Saotome | Ranma ½ |
| 2023/2024 (9th) | Franciska Friede | Momo Ayase | Dandadan |
| 2023/2024 (9th) | Jörg Hengstler | Kogoro Mori | Detective Conan: Black Iron Submarine |
| 2023/2024 (9th) | Magdalena Höfner | Marcille Donato | Delicious in Dungeon |
2025 (10th)
| 2025 (10th) | Gerrit Schmidt-Foß | Akaza | Demon Slayer: Kimetsu no Yaiba – The Movie: Infinity Castle |
| 2025 (10th) | Dirk Bublies | Kogoro Mori | Detective Conan: One-eyed Flashback |
| 2025 (10th) | Laurine Betz | Reze | Chainsaw Man – The Movie: Reze Arc |
| 2025 (10th) | Magdalena Höfner | Kiui Watase | Jellyfish Can't Swim in the Night |
| 2025 (10th) | Markus Feustel | Rudo Surebrec | Gachiakuta |
| 2025 (10th) | Patricia Strasburger | Nico Wakatsuki | Witch Watch |

=== Latin American Spanish ===
2020s

| Year | Recipient | Character(s) | Anime |
2021 (6th)
| 2021 (6th) | Irwin Daayán | Kyojuro Rengoku | Demon Slayer: Kimetsu no Yaiba Mugen Train Arc (season 2) |
| 2021 (6th) | José Vilchis | Spike Spiegel | Cowboy Bebop |
| 2021 (6th) | Victor Ugarte | Shinji Ikari | Evangelion 3.0+1.0 Thrice Upon a Time |
| 2021 (6th) | José Gilberto Vilchis | Satoru Gojo | Jujutsu Kaisen (cour 2) |
| 2021 (6th) | Jessica Ángeles | Kaguya Shinomiya | Kaguya-sama: Love Is War |
| 2021 (6th) | Romina Marroquín | Kumoko | So I'm a Spider, So What? |
2021/2022 (7th)
| 2021/2022 (7th) | Alejandro Orozco | Gyutaro | Demon Slayer: Kimetsu no Yaiba Entertainment District Arc (season 2 cour 2) |
| 2021/2022 (7th) | Diana Castañeda | Chisato Nishikigi | Lycoris Recoil |
| 2021/2022 (7th) | Elizabeth Infante | Chika Fujiwara | Kaguya-sama: Love Is War – Ultra Romantic (season 3) |
| 2021/2022 (7th) | Erika Langarica | Marin Kitagawa | My Dress-Up Darling |
| 2021/2022 (7th) | Miguel de León | Loid Forger | Spy × Family |
| 2021/2022 (7th) | Víctor Hugo Aguilar | Ains Ooal Gown | Overlord (season 4) |
2022/2023 (8th)
| 2022/2023 (8th) | Emilio Treviño | Denji | Chainsaw Man |
| 2022/2023 (8th) | Armando Corona Ibarrola | Muichiro Tokito | Demon Slayer: Kimetsu no Yaiba Swordsmith Village Arc (season 3) |
| 2022/2023 (8th) | Gerardo Ortega | Mash Burnedead | Mashle: Magic and Muscles |
| 2022/2023 (8th) | José Gilberto Vilchis | Satoru Gojo | Jujutsu Kaisen (season 2) |
| 2022/2023 (8th) | Manuel Campuzano | Arataka Reigen | Mob Psycho 100 III (season 3) |
| 2022/2023 (8th) | Nycolle González | Suzume Iwato | Suzume |
2023/2024 (9th)
| 2023/2024 (9th) | Miguel Ángel Leal | Eren Jaeger | Attack on Titan: The Final Season The Final Chapters Special 2 (season 4 cour 4) |
| 2023/2024 (9th) | Alicia Vélez | Momo Ayase | Dandadan |
| 2023/2024 (9th) | Desireé González | Maomao | The Apothecary Diaries |
| 2023/2024 (9th) | Erika Ugalde | Frieren | Frieren: Beyond Journey's End |
| 2023/2024 (9th) | Luis Leonardo Suárez | Muzan Kibutsuji | Demon Slayer: Kimetsu no Yaiba Hashira Training Arc (season 4) |
| 2023/2024 (9th) | Omar Sánchez | Kafka Hibino | Kaiju No. 8 |
2025 (10th)
| 2025 (10th) | José Antonio Toledano | Akaza | Demon Slayer: Kimetsu no Yaiba – The Movie: Infinity Castle |
| 2025 (10th) | Desireé González | Maomao | The Apothecary Diaries (season 2) |
| 2025 (10th) | Dion González | Rudo Surebrec | Gachiakuta |
| 2025 (10th) | Erika Langarica | Marin Kitagawa | My Dress-Up Darling (season 2) |
| 2025 (10th) | Fernando Moctezuma | Sung Jin-woo | Solo Leveling: Arise from the Shadow (season 2) |
| 2025 (10th) | Jessica Ángeles | Reze | Chainsaw Man – The Movie: Reze Arc |

=== Portuguese ===
2020s

| Year | Recipient | Character(s) | Anime |
2021 (6th)
| 2021 (6th) | Léo Rabelo | Satoru Gojo | Jujutsu Kaisen (cour 2) |
| 2021 (6th) | Hannah Buttel | Vladilena Milizé | 86 |
| 2021 (6th) | Amanda Brigido | Nobara Kugisaki | Jujutsu Kaisen (cour 2) |
| 2021 (6th) | Carol Valença | Monkey D. Luffy | One Piece |
| 2021 (6th) | Luísa Viotti | Echidna | Re:Zero − Starting Life in Another World (season 2) |
| 2021 (6th) | Luiz Sergio Vieira | Takemichi Hanagaki | Tokyo Revengers |
2021/2022 (7th)
| 2021/2022 (7th) | Nina Carvalho | Anya Forger | Spy × Family |
| 2021/2022 (7th) | Antônio Moreno | Heihachi Mishima | Tekken: Bloodline |
| 2021/2022 (7th) | Charles Emmanuel | Kazuya Kinoshita | Rent-A-Girlfriend (season 2) |
| 2021/2022 (7th) | Mariana Dondi | Hayase Nagatoro | Don't Toy with Me, Miss Nagatoro |
| 2021/2022 (7th) | Pedro Alcântara | Yuta Okkotsu | Jujutsu Kaisen 0 |
| 2021/2022 (7th) | Yan Gesteira | Ashito Aoi | Aoashi |
2022/2023 (8th)
| 2022/2023 (8th) | Léo Rabelo | Satoru Gojo | Jujutsu Kaisen (season 2) |
| 2022/2023 (8th) | Amanda Brigido | Tomo Aizawa | Tomo-chan Is a Girl! |
| 2022/2023 (8th) | Erick Bougleux | Kazuma Satou | KonoSuba: God's Blessing on This Wonderful World! Legend of Crimson |
| 2022/2023 (8th) | Guilherme Briggs | Brook | One Piece |
| 2022/2023 (8th) | Luisa Viotti | Makima | Chainsaw Man |
| 2022/2023 (8th) | Vágner Fagundes | Arataka Reigen | Mob Psycho 100 III (season 3) |
2023/2024 (9th)
| 2023/2024 (9th) | Charles Emmanuel | Sung Jin-woo | Solo Leveling |
| 2023/2024 (9th) | Bruna Laynes | Marcille Donato | Delicious in Dungeon |
| 2023/2024 (9th) | Celso Henrique | Sunraku | Shangri-La Frontier (season 1) |
| 2023/2024 (9th) | Gigi Patta | Maomao | The Apothecary Diaries |
| 2023/2024 (9th) | Heitor Assali | Reno Ichikawa | Kaiju No. 8 |
| 2023/2024 (9th) | Pedro Azevedo | Dot Barrett | Mashle: Magic and Muscles The Divine Visionary Candidate Exam Arc (season 2) |
2025 (10th)
| 2025 (10th) | Charles Emmanuel | Akaza | Demon Slayer: Kimetsu no Yaiba – The Movie: Infinity Castle |
| 2025 (10th) | Bruno Sangregório | Levi Ackerman | Attack on Titan: The Last Attack |
| 2025 (10th) | Erick Bougleux | Zanka Nijiku | Gachiakuta |
| 2025 (10th) | Fábio Lucindo | Katsuki Bakugo | My Hero Academia: Final Season (season 8) |
| 2025 (10th) | Gigi Patta | Maomao | The Apothecary Diaries (season 2) |
| 2025 (10th) | Úrsula Bezerra | Son Goku | Dragon Ball Daima |

=== Russian ===
2020s

| Year | Recipient | Character(s) | Anime |
2021 (6th)
| 2021 (6th) | Islam Gandzhaev | Tanjiro Kamado | Demon Slayer: Kimetsu no Yaiba – The Movie: Mugen Train |
| 2021 (6th) | Vlad Tokarev | Eren Jaeger | Attack on Titan: The Final Season Part 1 (season 4) |
| 2021 (6th) | Olga Matskevich | Mire Yoshizuki | Looking for Magical Doremi |
| 2021 (6th) | Polina Rtischeva | Monkey D. Luffy | One Piece |
| 2021 (6th) | Elizaveta Sheikh | Kumoko | So I'm a Spider, So What? |
| 2021 (6th) | Tatyana Shamarina | Vivy | Vivy: Fluorite Eye's Song |

=== Arabic ===
2020s

| Year | Recipient | Character(s) | Anime |
2021/2022 (7th)
| 2021/2022 (7th) | Amal Hajiwa | Gon Freecss | Hunter × Hunter |
| 2021/2022 (7th) | Adel Abo Hassoon | Kage | Ranking of Kings |
| 2021/2022 (7th) | Amal Saadalden | Conan Edogawa | Detective Conan: The Bride of Halloween |
| 2021/2022 (7th) | Mohja AlSheak | Izuku "Deku" Midoriya | My Hero Academia (season 1) |
| 2021/2022 (7th) | Naji Makhoul | Ichigo Kurosaki | Bleach (season 1) |
| 2021/2022 (7th) | Ula Zidan | Marin Kitagawa | My Dress-Up Darling |
2022/2023 (8th)
| 2022/2023 (8th) | Taleb Alrefai | Senku Ishigami | Dr. Stone (season 1) |
| 2022/2023 (8th) | Basil Alrefai | Vegeta | Dragon Ball Super |
| 2022/2023 (8th) | Hiba Snobar | Anya Forger | Spy × Family (season 1 cour 1) |
| 2022/2023 (8th) | Mohammad Dal'o | Arataka Reigen | Mob Psycho 100 |
| 2022/2023 (8th) | Ra'fat Bazo | Son Goku | Dragon Ball Super |
| 2022/2023 (8th) | Rosie Yaziji | Rimuru Tempest | That Time I Got Reincarnated as a Slime (season 1) |
2023/2024 (9th)
| 2023/2024 (9th) | Hiba Snobar | Anya Forger | Spy × Family (season 2) |
| 2023/2024 (9th) | Basel Al Rifaiey | Loid Forger | Spy × Family (season 2) |
| 2023/2024 (9th) | Julien Chaaya | Yoichi Isagi | Blue Lock (season 2) |
| 2023/2024 (9th) | Lama AlSayyagh | Marcille Donato | Delicious in Dungeon |
| 2023/2024 (9th) | Mohammed Sami | Rin Itoshi | Blue Lock (season 2) |
| 2023/2024 (9th) | Nawar AlMahairi | Laios Touden | Delicious in Dungeon |
2025 (10th)
| 2025 (10th) | Tariq Obaid | Taro Sakamoto | Sakamoto Days |
| 2025 (10th) | Hamoud Abu Hassoun | Loid Forger (Childhood) | Spy × Family (season 3) |
| 2025 (10th) | Moataz El-Shazly | Heisuke Mashimo | Sakamoto Days |
| 2025 (10th) | Ra'fat Bazo | Yuri Briar | Spy × Family (season 3) |
| 2025 (10th) | Fatima Zakaria | Osaragi | Sakamoto Days |
| 2025 (10th) | Ghada Omar | Yor Forger | Spy × Family (season 3) |

=== Italian ===
2020s

| Year | Recipient | Character(s) | Anime |
2021/2022 (7th)
| 2021/2022 (7th) | Elisa Giorgio | Maki Zen'in | Jujutsu Kaisen (cour 1) |
| 2021/2022 (7th) | Andrea La Greca | Kyojuro Rengoku | Demon Slayer: Kimetsu no Yaiba Mugen Train Arc (season 2) |
| 2021/2022 (7th) | Andrea Oldani | Daida | Ranking of Kings (cour 1) |
| 2021/2022 (7th) | Deborah Morese | Marin Kitagawa | My Dress-Up Darling |
| 2021/2022 (7th) | Giulia Maniglio | Riku | Made in Abyss: The Golden City of the Scorching Sun |
| 2021/2022 (7th) | Simone Lupinacci | Shoyo Hinata | Haikyū!! To the Top (season 4) |
2022/2023 (8th)
| 2022/2023 (8th) | Mosè Singh | Denji | Chainsaw Man |
| 2022/2023 (8th) | Alessio De Filippis | Kirito | Sword Art Online Progressive: Scherzo of Deep Night |
| 2022/2023 (8th) | Benedetta Ponticelli | Makima | Chainsaw Man |
| 2022/2023 (8th) | Diego Baldoin | Takenori Akagi | The First Slam Dunk |
| 2022/2023 (8th) | Federica Simonelli | Uta | One Piece Film: Red |
| 2022/2023 (8th) | Max Di Benedetto | Boxxo | Reborn as a Vending Machine, I Now Wander the Dungeon |
2023/2024 (9th)
| 2023/2024 (9th) | Ilaria Pellicone | Kyomoto | Look Back |
| 2023/2024 (9th) | Alessandro Pili | Kenma Kozume | Haikyu!! The Dumpster Battle |
| 2023/2024 (9th) | Andrea Oldani | Jinshi | The Apothecary Diaries |
| 2023/2024 (9th) | Katia Sorrentino | Neia Baraja | Overlord: The Sacred Kingdom |
| 2023/2024 (9th) | Martina Felli | Frieren | Frieren: Beyond Journey's End |
| 2023/2024 (9th) | Mattia Bressan | Kafka Hibino | Kaiju No. 8 |
2025 (10th)
| 2025 (10th) | Mosè Singh | Denji | Chainsaw Man – The Movie: Reze Arc |
| 2025 (10th) | Katia Sorrentino | Momo Ayase | Dandadan (season 2) |
| 2025 (10th) | Leonardo Graziano | Naruto Uzumaki | Boruto: Naruto the Movie |
| 2025 (10th) | Luna Fogu | Maomao | The Apothecary Diaries (season 2) |
| 2025 (10th) | Martina Tamburello | Kikoru Shinomiya | Kaiju No. 8 |
| 2025 (10th) | Simone Luppinaci | Izuku "Deku" Midoriya | My Hero Academia: Final Season (season 8) |

=== Hindi ===
2020s

| Year | Recipient | Character(s) | Anime |
2023/2024 (9th)
| 2023/2024 (9th) | Lohit Sharma | Satoru Gojo | Jujutsu Kaisen (season 2) |
| 2023/2024 (9th) | Abishek Sharma | Einar | Vinland Saga (season 2) |
| 2023/2024 (9th) | Natasha John | Frieren | Frieren: Beyond Journey's End |
| 2023/2024 (9th) | Rajesh Shukla | Sung Jin-woo | Solo Leveling |
| 2023/2024 (9th) | Ranjit R. Tiwari | Yoichi Isagi | Blue Lock (season 2) |
| 2023/2024 (9th) | Rushikesh Phunse | Kafka Hibino | Kaiju No. 8 |
2025 (10th)
| 2025 (10th) | Abishek Sharma | Jinshi | The Apothecary Diaries (season 2) |
| 2025 (10th) | Akshita Mishra | Koyuki | Demon Slayer: Kimetsu no Yaiba – The Movie: Infinity Castle |
| 2025 (10th) | Heena Malik | Reze | Chainsaw Man – The Movie: Reze Arc |
| 2025 (10th) | Merlyn James | Anya Forger | Spy × Family (season 3) |
| 2025 (10th) | Rajesh Shukla | Sung Jin-woo | Solo Leveling: Arise from the Shadow (season 2) |
| 2025 (10th) | Shilpie Pandey | Lufas Maphaahl | A Wild Last Boss Appeared! |
