= Jinshi (The Apothecary Diaries) =

Fictional character from The Apothecary Diaries

- The Apothecary Diaries character
- Jinshi as illustrated by Touko Shino
- First appearance: Chapter 1: "Maomao" (2011 webnovel); Chapter 3: "Jinshi" (2012 novel, 2014 light novel)
- Created by: Hyūganatsu
- Voiced by: Japanese: Takahiro Sakurai (drama CDs), Takeo Ōtsuka (anime), Megumi Han (child); English: Kaiji Tang (adult), Mikaela Krantz (young)

In-universe information
- Full name: Ka Zuigetsu (華瑞月(かずいげつ), Huá Ruì Yuè)

Jinshi (Japanese: 壬氏), full name Ka Zuigetsu (華瑞月(かずいげつ), Huá Ruì Yuè), is the male protagonist of Hyūganatsu's light novel series The Apothecary Diaries. Jinshi is a eunuch from the Imperial Palace filled with laundry women, serving the Emperor's concubines, eunuchs, and respective staff in the Rear Palace. He finds the protagonist, Maomao, a young apothecary and introduces Maomao to Consort Gyokuyou due to her notable skills. As the plot progresses, Jinshi's true identity is revealed as he is connected with other characters working in the Imperial Palace but becomes attracted to Maomao, wanting her to remain by his side. He is often accompanied by Gaoshun who has taken care of him since childhood.

In the animated adaptations of the series, multiple voice actors provided their talents for Jinshi. Critical response to the character has been generally positive due to his mysterious identity and dynamic with the protagonist Maomao. However, some critics were against his love for Maomao.

== Creation ==
The author HyugaNatsu has publicly stated that the reason she invented this series is because Jinshi and MaoMao came to her in a dream. When creating the character of Jinshi, Hyūganatsu made him with light-hearted feelings similar to characters explored in shōjo manga. Hyūganatsu said that she had two ideas: make him a eunuch or leave it to the readers to decide. She later planned for Jinshi to die since he ended up being the most difficult character to write but scrapped that idea alongside other personality traits. The character's popularity resulted in significant changes made to his personality and plotlines. In the original concept for the light novels The Apothecary Diaries, Hyūganatsu conceptualized Jinshi as well as his relationship with Gaoshun in a different manner from the final product; Jinshi was originally going to be a more vulnerable figure with Gaoshun having orders to kill him. Had the story followed this path, the bond between Jinshi and Gaoshun would have been challenged. Furthermore, Jinshi was not going to be a major power figure in the Palace and would instead be used as a pawn by other members, leading to an assassination arc. These ideas were scrapped and Jinshi became "an elegant and seemingly untouchable figure." When it came to Jinshi's romantic overtones with Maomao, Hyūganatsu found it challenging writing intimate scenes when compared to the story-driven main plot.

Anime director Norihiro Naganuma said that Maomao shows notable growth in the first season when she expresses her trauma to Jinshi in the final episodes. Naganuma also saw Gaoshun as a caretaker to both Jinshi and Maomao, able to tell how close they had become. For "Hyakka Ryōran" performed by Lilas Ikuta, the lyrics were written to focus on Jinshi and Maomao's dynamic in the story.

=== Casting ===
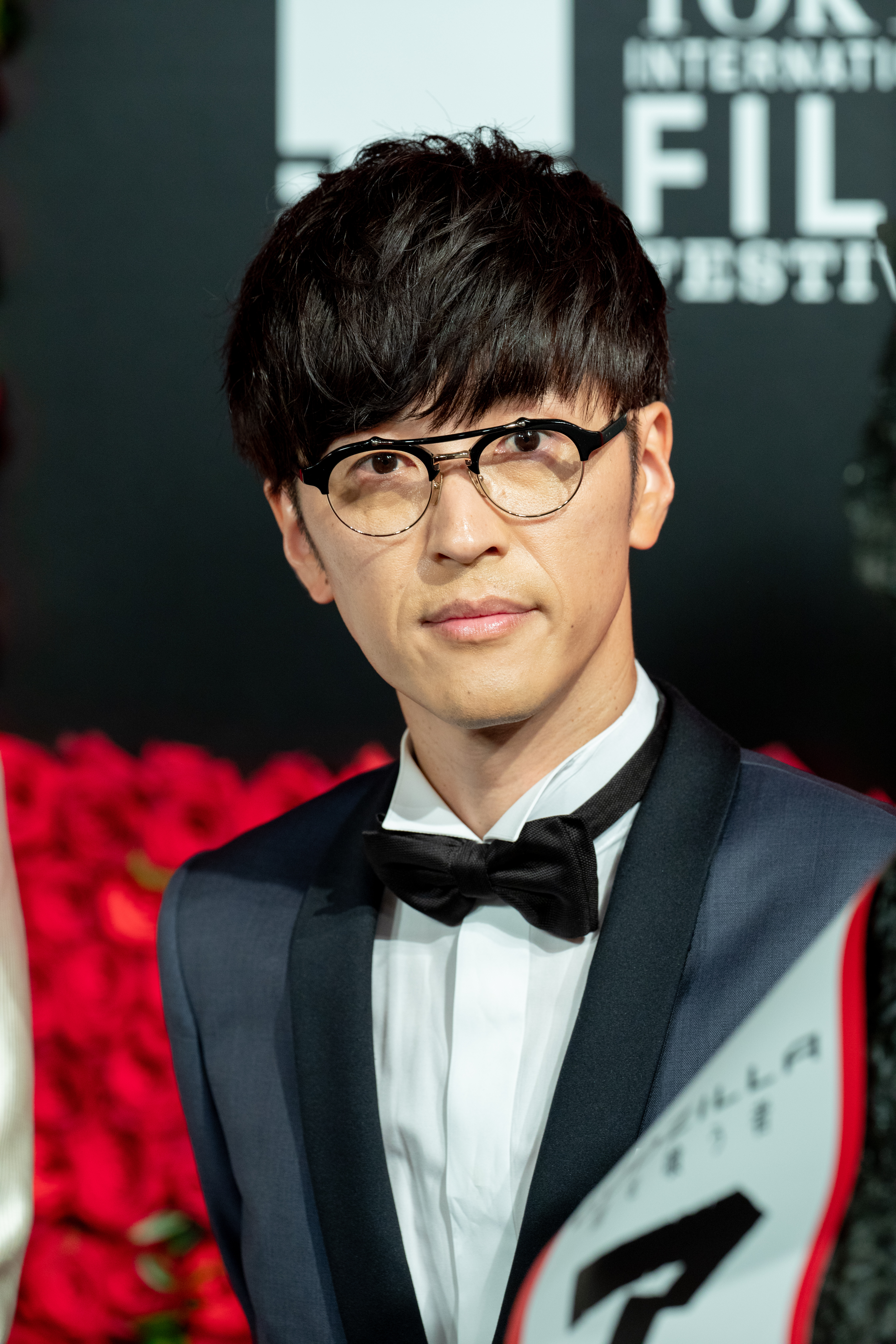
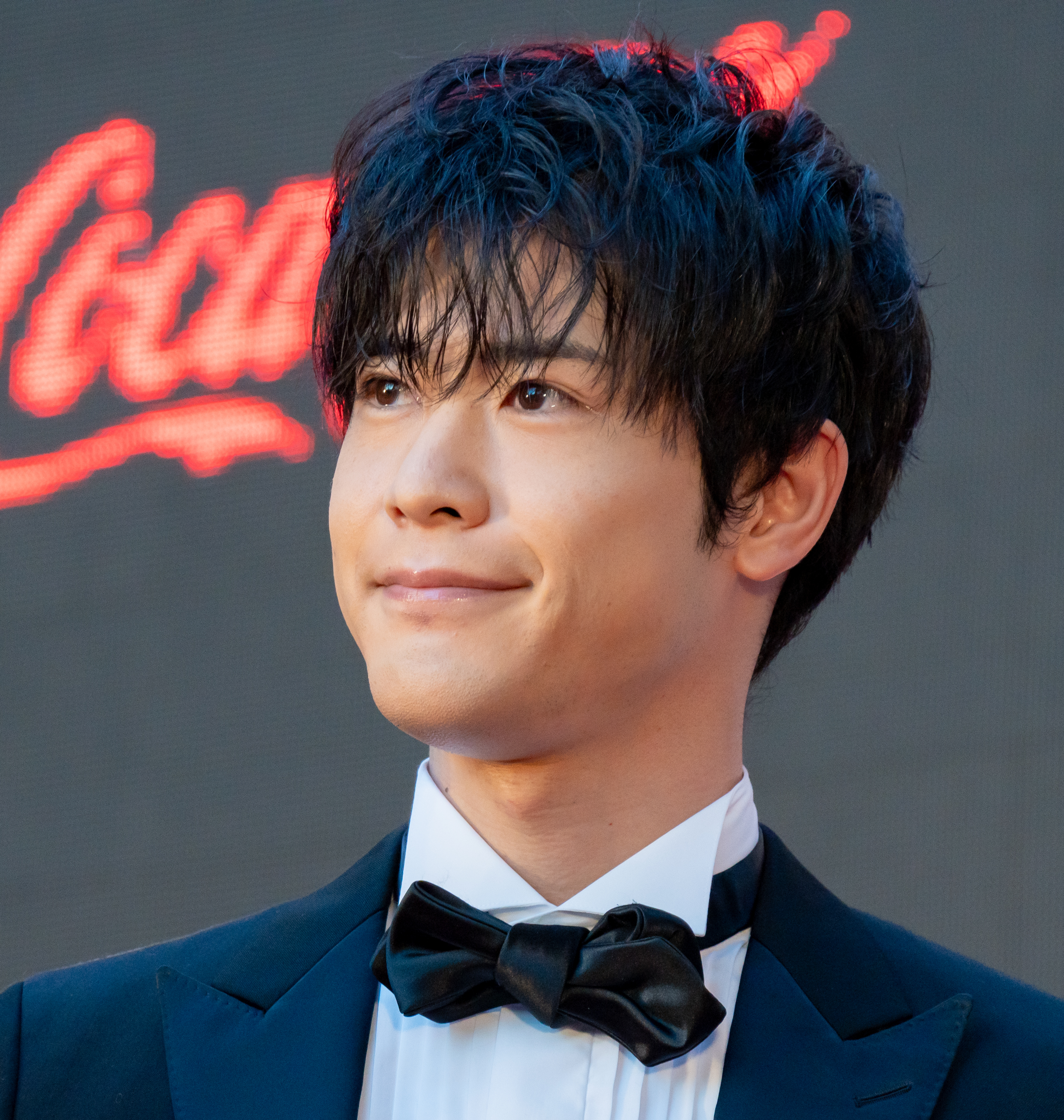
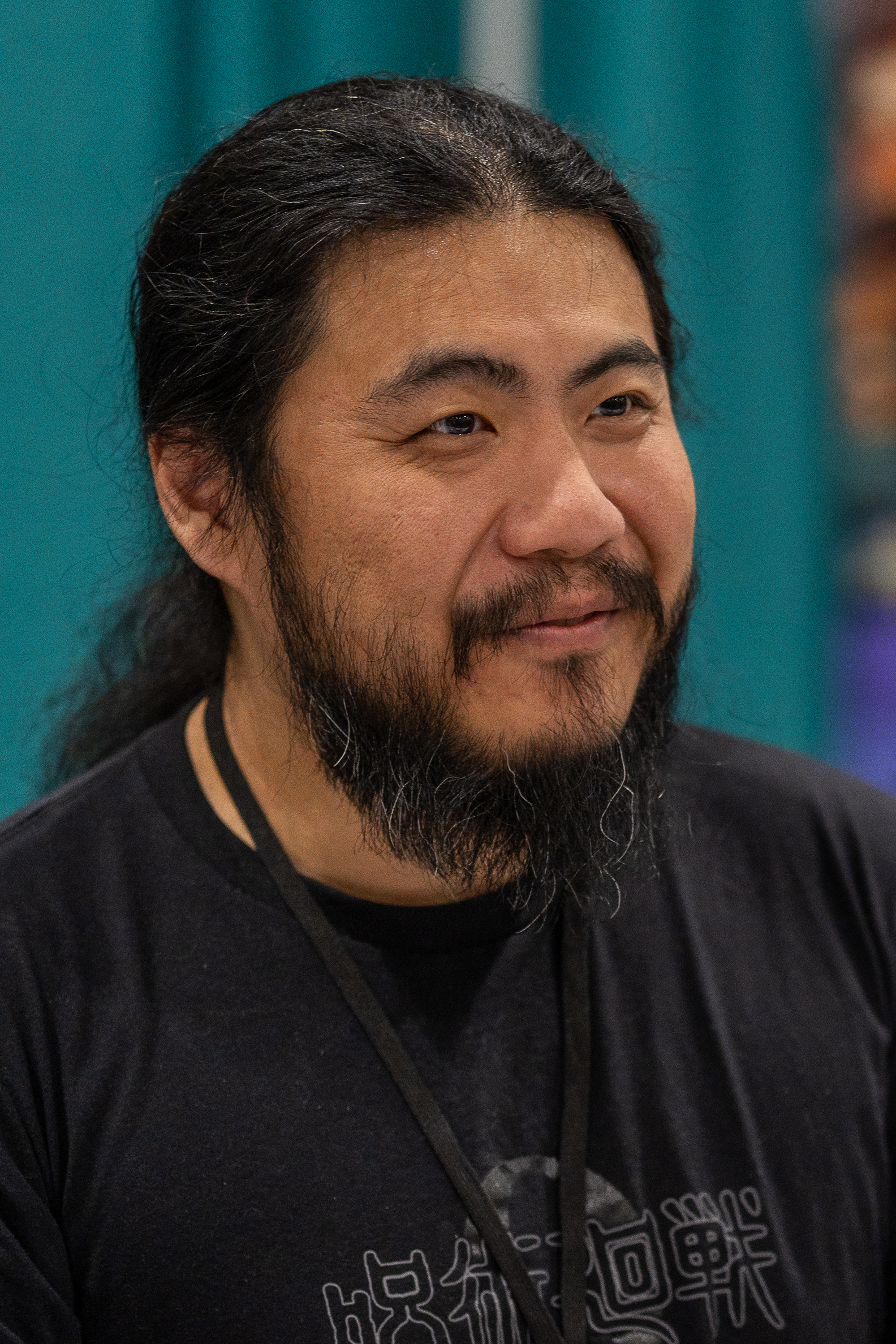
While Takahiro Sakurai (first) voiced Jinshi in a drama CD, Takeo Ōtsuka (middle) voiced him in the Japanese animated adaptation which was dubbed into English by Kaiji Tang (right)

In the drama CD, Jinshi was voiced by Takahiro Sakurai with voice actress Aoi Yūki (Maomao) describing the experience as "like a harem". Takeo Ōtsuka replaced Sakurai for the anime series where he befriended Yūki. Ōtsuka was said to use multiple expressions in order to make his character more appealing. Yūki believed both Maomao and Jinshi suffered multiple changes after the first season's ending and looked forward to the second season. Ōtsuka enjoyed recording with Takuya Kirimoto (Lakan). He further thanked the director for helping him to grasp more of Jinshi's characterization, as the second season revealed a more childish side to the character. Megumi Han voices Jinshi as a child. In English he is voiced by Kaiji Tang as an adult, and Mikaela Krantz when young. There was backlash to one of Jinshi's more suggestive moments involving Maomao, with Kaiji Tang apologizing for the furor.

== Role in The Apothecary Diaries ==
Jinshi is introduced as an eunuch who runs most of the administration of the rear palace, where the Emperor's concubines and their respective staff reside. Jinshi's appearance and allure are frequently described as androgynous because he possesses an overwhelmingly beautiful, soft, and feminine face that contrasts with his lean but well-built, masculine physique. Both men and women alike are attracted to his physical appearance, but he finds himself attracted to Maomao, the only person he has met who is not immediately enamored by him. It is revealed that Jinshi is not a eunuch, he merely is using suppressants (anaphrodisiacs) to appear as one, in order to hide his identity as the Emperor's brother. Behind his face lies a shrewd mind that tries to balance his duties to the Emperor while improving life within the Imperial Palace. Jinshi is an intelligent scholar, Maomao describes him as more childish and rough than he appears. He is usually accompanied by Gaoshun, his loyal attendant, often supporting him.

When Maomao is laid off as a result of a lady-in-waiting attempting murder on another consort, Jinshi is torn between keeping her and letting her go, thinking she hates working at the rear palace. Jinshi ultimately decides to set Maomao free thinking that that's what she wanted, not knowing that she actually wanted to stay. Later, Jinshi attends a party where Maomao is working as a trainee courtesan, and he proposes to buy her out upon learning that she misses working at the rear palace. Maomao returns to the palace, but this time to work in the outer court, because, as Gaoshun explains to her, they cannot just restore her former position after being laid off.

Maomao discovers that Jinshi's family has long been served by the Ma Clan, to which Gaoshun and Basen belong, while Basen, serving as Jinshi's temporary assistant, is instructed to keep Jinshi's identity secret. Only two people in the land have the character "Ka" in their name: the emperor and Jinshi, also known as Ka Zuigetsu (華瑞月(かずいげつ) Huá Ruì Yuè), his brother.

Jinshi frequently helps Maomao in her investigations, taking the matter into his own hands when she suddenly disappears, having been kidnapped by the Shi clan. In order to attack the Shi fortress, Lakan, Maomao's father and the military strategist, addresses Jinshi as a royal, asking him to assume his role as Imperial Brother in order to mobilize the Forbidden Army and lead the rebellion. As the Imperial brother, Jinshi lets go of Maomao as his employee.

Maomao later learns that Jinshi is actually the Emperor's son and was swapped with the Emperor's deceased brother in infancy. As the Emperor's eldest son, Jinshi is next in the line of succession, but he repeatedly voices his discontent and wish to never be Emperor. It is unclear whether Jinshi himself is aware of the circumstances of his birth.

Besides several adaptations based on The Apothecary Diaries, Jinshi has been featured alongside Maomao in a series of animated shorts dealing with gags.

== Reception ==
=== Popularity ===
Merchandise based on Maomao and Jinshi's looks was produced. At the 9th Crunchyroll Anime Awards, Jinshi was nominated for "Best Supporting Character". Two of Jinshi's international voice actors were nominated for the "Best Voice Artist Performance" category, namely Julien Allouf (French) and Andrea Oldani (Italian); however, they lost to Adrien Antoine's Kafka Hibino and Ilaria Pellicone's Kyomoto, respectively. At the 10th edition, Jinshi was nominated again for "Best Supporting Character". Abishek Sharma won "Best Voice Artist Performance (Hindi)" for his performance as Jinshi. In the 2025 Anime Grand Prix, Jinshi took fourth place in the Best Character category while Takeo Ōtsuka ranked fifth for his performance as Jinshi.

=== Critical response ===
Jinshi's portrayal as a warrior was noted to be a major departure from the initial figure fans were used to in the series' beginning.

Critical response to Jinshi's character has been generally positive. FandomWire said that Jinshi was initially seen as a likable main character thanks to his charismatic personality but the more he fell in love with Maomao, it challenges the audience who want to see the possibility of the two protagonists starting a romance. While the romance is not the most major factor in the series, it is also crucial to the proper development of each character on their own future episodes and thus Jinshi was in need of a bigger arc. Anime Feminist found Jinshi's characterization interesting and as well as his dynamic with Maomao but was bothered by where was going their constant interactions as if the narrative would bring more sexual scenes. Time enjoyed the mystery of the first season involving the culprit who wants to kill Jinshi as it helps develop the character in a violent case where more twists are given about each. Jinshi's relationship with the Imperial Family remains as one of the biggest mysteries in early episodes, an appealing case for fans of mystery that also helps to challenge his identity more. Game Rant said the relationship with Jinshi as "nothing short of brilliant" as they balance each other due to their notable traits subtle moments that help slowly develop their bond.

Collider compared them to K-dramas due to how they often involve cases of medicine with a high level of detail and how different is the latter's relationship from other women. The writer added "Maomao is a brilliant protagonist who is instantly loveable from her passion for apothecary and nosy brain." praising the evolution of her relationship with Jinshi and how the second season of the anime can build on this after seeing previews. IGN said most of the series' entertainment comes from how Maomao reacts to the characters' facades as well as her hostile and playful interactions with Jinshi. In retrospect, Polygon said the relationship was also entertaining, considering the true nature behind their casual interactions as they constantly hide secrets from each other.

During a scene from the second season, Jinshi and Maomao nearly kiss when she falls over him in a cave and when the latter tries to get up, she squeezes the former's crotch under the belief she grabbed a large frog by accident since she did not know Jinshi was faking being eunuch. After this, Jinshi and Maomao start arguing about the crotch indirectly by instead talking about frogs. Polygon claimed this accident became hot topic on social media as several fans joked about frogs and whether or not Jinshi's crotch size was fitting for a frog. Nevertheless, the writer from Polygon enjoyed the chemistry the duo has and expected in future episodes, their relationship is further explored. The scene was also praised as one of the best moments in anime from the same year for the unusual mix sexual tension and comedy while also changing the dynamic between this two characters in the process. As the second season of the story moves to a more action narrative, Jinshi's portrayal as a warrior was praised for how he has changed since the beginning, reflecting a major growth in his personality and identity.
