= The Apothecary Diaries =

Japanese light novel series and its adaptations

- First light novel volume cover, featuring Maomao

薬屋のひとりごと (Kusuriya no Hitorigoto)
- Genre: Drama; Mystery; Romance
- Novel series
- Written by: Hyūganatsu
- Published by: Shōsetsuka ni Narō
- Original run: October 27, 2011 – present
- Novel
- Written by: Hyūganatsu
- Illustrated by: Megumi Matsuda
- Published by: Shufunotomo
- Imprint: Ray Books
- Published: September 26, 2012
- Light novel
- Written by: Hyūganatsu
- Illustrated by: Touko Shino
- Published by: Shufunotomo
- English publisher: NA: J-Novel Club (digital); Square Enix (print)
- Imprint: Hero Bunko
- Original run: August 29, 2014 – present
- Volumes: 16
- Manga
- Written by: Hyūganatsu; Itsuki Nanao
- Illustrated by: Nekokurage
- Published by: Square Enix
- English publisher: NA: Square Enix
- Magazine: Monthly Big Gangan
- Original run: May 25, 2017 – present
- Volumes: 17
- Manga

Maomao's Notes on the Inner Palace
- Written by: Minoji Kurata
- Published by: Shogakukan
- English publisher: NA: Viz Media; SEA: Shogakukan Asia
- Magazine: Monthly Sunday Gene-X
- Original run: August 19, 2017 – present
- Volumes: 22
- Manga

Xiaolan's Story
- Written by: Hyūganatsu
- Illustrated by: Itsuki Nanao
- Published by: Square Enix
- English publisher: NA: Square Enix
- Magazine: Manga Up!
- Original run: March 23, 2025 – present
- Volumes: 1
- Television drama
- Directed by: Yuki Saito
- Written by: Erika Yoshida
- Studio: Toho; Amazon MGM Studios
- Licensed by: Amazon Prime Video
- Original run: 2028 – scheduled
- Anime television series
- The Apothecary Diaries (2023–present)
- icon

The Apothecary Diaries (Japanese: 薬屋のひとりごと, Hepburn: Kusuriya no Hitorigoto; lit. 'Apothecary's Soliloquy') is a Japanese light novel series written by Hyūganatsu and illustrated by Touko Shino. Since 2011, it has been serialized on the user-generated novel publishing website Shōsetsuka ni Narō. In 2012, Shufunotomo acquired the work, releasing it as a single-volume novel that year and then as a light novel series in 2014.

Set in a fictional country inspired by Tang Dynasty-era China, the series follows Maomao, a girl trained in medicine by her apothecary father. After being sold as a servant to the emperor's palace, she secretly uses her skills to solve mysteries and help others.

Two manga adaptations began serialization in 2017. The first is published by Square Enix in Monthly Big Gangan with art by Nekokurage, while the second is published by Shogakukan in Monthly Sunday Gene-X with art by Minoji Kurata. The light novels are licensed digitally in North America by J-Novel Club, while both the light novels and first manga adaptation are licensed in print by Square Enix.

An anime television series adaptation produced by Toho Animation Studio and OLM aired from October 2023 to March 2024, and a second season aired from January to July 2025. A third season premiered in October 2026. An anime film entitled The Late Lady's Treasure is set to premiere in Japan in December 2026. A live-action drama series adaptation will be streamed worldwide on Amazon Prime Video in 2028.

== Synopsis ==
Set in a fictional country based on Imperial China during the Tang dynasty, often referencing knowledge closer to the late Ming dynasty, the series follows Maomao, a young girl working as an apothecary in a red-light district, who was kidnapped and sold to the Imperial Palace as an indentured servant. She still retains her curious and eccentric personality and plans to work there until her two years of servitude are over. After learning that the emperor's newborns and concubines are critically ill, she begins to investigate the cause. Using her experience as an apothecary, she successfully solves the mystery of their illness. Even though she intended to remain anonymous, her actions catch the attention of Jinshi, an influential eunuch. Then, consequently, she undertakes the solving of mysteries for the royal court.

== Production ==
The series author, Hyūganatsu, initially conceived the work as the story of an adult woman with three children in a mining town who begins solving mysteries after discovering a poisoning death. However, she concluded that the concept would not be well received, so she changed the main character to a teenager and gave her the role of an apothecary. This gave the character knowledge of medicine, which compensated for her lack of experience as a mother. Hyūganatsu said she took "the most interesting parts of 1,000 years of Chinese history", from the Tang dynasty to the 19th century, as well as some "Japanese sensibilities", to create the story's setting. She also noted that "technically, it is not set in China." She stated that some of the botany mysteries are based on real events documented in old news reports. From the concept of a "woman with three children," the protagonist of The Apothecary Diaries, Maomao, was created. By making her a pharmacist, the author gave her knowledge of medicine. In order to show Maomao as a more capable character, Hyuganatsu also created the skilled but flawed Doctor Guen to serve as a contrast to Maomao, who would overshadow him.

When creating Jinshi, Hyūganatsu said that she had two ideas: make him a eunuch or leave it to the readers to decide. She later planned for Jinshi to die since he ended up being the most difficult character to write but scrapped that idea alongside other personality traits. The character's popularity resulted in significant changes made to his personality and plotlines. In the original concept for the light novels The Apothecary Diaries, Hyūganatsu conceptualized Jinshi as well as his relationship with Gaoshun in a different manner from the final product; Jinshi was originally going to be a more vulnerable figure with Gaoshun having orders to kill him. Had the story followed this path, the bond between Jinshi and Gaoshun would have been challenged. Furthermore, Jinshi was not going to be a major power figure in the Palace and would instead be used as a pawn by other members, leading to an assassination arc. These ideas were scrapped and Jinshi became "an elegant and seemingly untouchable figure." When it came to Jinshi's romantic overtones with Maomao, Hyūganatsu found it challenging writing intimate scenes when compared to the story-driven main plot.

In May 2025, Hyūganatsu said she planned to finish the series with the eleventh volume. However, this did not happen. She said, "It will probably continue a little longer. We will do our best to find a satisfying ending for everyone."

== Media ==
=== Novel ===
The series was first published by Hyūganatsu on the user-generated web novel site Shōsetsuka ni Narō in October 2011. The publisher Shufunotomo acquired the series and published it under their Ray Books imprint as a single-volume novel on September 26, 2012, with illustrations by Megumi Matsuda.

=== Light novel ===
In 2014, Shufunotomo began to publish the series again, illustrated by Touko Shino. This time, it was published as a light novel in their Hero Bunko imprint, which is mostly made of acquired Shōsetsuka ni Narō titles. Sixteen volumes have been released as of May 30, 2025. J-Novel Club announced in November 2020 that it had licensed the light novel series. In October 2023, Square Enix announced that it would release the light novels in print starting in May 2024.

=== Manga ===
A manga adaptation by Itsuki Nanao and illustrated by Nekokurage began in Square Enix's Monthly Big Gangan on May 25, 2017. Square Enix has compiled its chapters into individual tankōbon volumes. The first volume was published on September 25, 2017. As of July 24, 2026, 17 volumes have been published.

In November 2019, Square Enix announced the English language release of the manga in North America and began publishing it in December 2020.

An alternative manga adaptation, titled The Apothecary Diaries: Maomao's Notes on the Inner Palace (薬屋のひとりごと～猫猫の後宮謎解き手帳～, Kusuriya no Hitorigoto: Maomao no Kōkyū Nazotoki Techō), illustrated by Minoji Kurata, began in Shogakukan's Monthly Sunday Gene-X on August 19, 2017. Shogakukan has compiled its chapters into individual tankōbon volumes. The first volume was published on February 19, 2018. As of June 18, 2026, 22 volumes have been published. The manga has been licensed in Southeast Asia by Shogakukan Asia, under the title The Apothecary Diaries: Maomao's Notes from the Inner Palace. Viz Media has licensed it for English release in North America, with the first volume set to release on October 20, 2026.

A spin-off manga centered around Xiaolan's point-of-view illustrated by Itsuki Nanao, titled The Apothecary Diaries: Xiaolan's Story, began serialization on Square Enix's Manga Up! manga service on March 23, 2025. The spin-off is also published in English on the Manga Up! Global website and app, and Square Enix will publish the volumes in print starting in October 2026.

=== Anime ===
An anime television series adaptation, produced by Toho Animation Studio and OLM, aired for 24 episodes from October 22, 2023, to March 24, 2024, on Nippon TV and its affiliates. (Note: Nippon TV listed the series premiere on October 21 at 25:05, effectively October 22 at 1:05 a.m. JST.) A second 24-episode season aired from January 10 to July 4, 2025.

Following the conclusion of the second season, a third season and an original anime film were announced. The third season premiered in split cours, with the first cours premiering on October 2, 2026, and the second cours in April 2027. The film titled The Apothecary Diaries: The Late Lady's Treasure is set to premiere in Japan on December 11, 2026.

=== Live-action drama ===
On September 3, 2026, a live-action drama series adaptation was announced. The series will be produced by Toho and Amazon MGM Studios and directed by Yuki Saito, with a screenplay written by Erika Yoshida. It is scheduled to be released worldwide on Amazon Prime Video in 2028. Mana Ashida will play Maomao.

=== Video games ===
A browser game, titled The Apothecary Diaries Palace Chronicles, was announced in July 2025 on Japanese browser games platform G123, operated by CTW Inc. In the simulation game, players train Maomao and take on various cases around the palace. The title was released on June 15, 2026, as a free-to-play game with in-app purchases.

The launch of the series's first console game, titled The Apothecary Diaries: The False Imperial Brother, was announced during the Nintendo Direct on September 9, 2026. Developed by Gust and Toho Games and published by Koei Tecmo, the game is set for release on March 18, 2027, on PlayStation 5, Nintendo Switch, Nintendo Switch 2, and Windows (via Steam). The title will feature an original storyline—planned by Hyūganatsu—in which Maomao investigates the "Five Mysteries" and the "Five Curses", requiring the player to find clues and interview witnesses to help her reach a solid conclusion. Occasionally, it will also be possible to control Jinshi in order to access information that Maomao cannot.

=== Other media ===
On January 31, 2024, Shufunotomo released an artbook for the series, which included all the illustrations featured in the light novel up to that point as well as new art by Touko Shino. On May 13, 2026, the same publisher released a recipe book from the series, titled Maomao's Recipes (猫猫の調合書(レシピ), Maomao no Reshipi), which was supervised by Hyūga and featured illustrations by Shino.

An animation exhibition featuring 3D recreations of the famous scenes in the series, original drawings, storyboards, art settings, and other production materials, ran in various cities in Japan from March 2025 to January 2026, and it will take place in Ibaraki between December 2026 and January 2027. The exhibition also traveled throughout Asia, starting with Hong Kong in November 2025. From July 1, 2025, to January 4, 2026, Universal Studios Japan hosted an attraction based on the series. An attraction featured Maomao and Jinshi where participants help them solving the mystery behind a mysterious panacea. As part of the "Universal Cool Japan" program, the theme park will feature an attraction based on the film The Deceased Empress' Treasure from February 10 to June 30, 2027. On August 2, 2026, Crunchyroll and Three Ten Merchandising Services announced that they would be collaborating on the second phase of an immersive experience event—which also includes the sale of collectibles—called The Loop, which would be themed around the anime series, along with Jujutsu Kaisen and Chainsaw Man, and takes place from August 22 to October 18 at the Westfield Topanga Mall in Canoga Park, California.

== Reception ==
=== Sales ===
In Japan, The Apothecary Diaries was the sixth best-selling light novel series in 2019, with 461,024 copies sold; the fifth best-selling light novel series in 2020, with 527,950 copies sold; and the third best-selling light novel series in 2021, with 496,626 copies sold. It was the sixth best-selling light novel series in the first half of 2023, with 163,677 copies sold. Volumes 15 and 16 were the best-selling light novel volumes of 2024 and 2025, respectively, with volume 16 having sold 200,000 during its period, volumes 5, 6 and 1 reached the eighth, ninth and tenth place in the 2024 ranking, respectively; in the same period, the 5th volume of the Nekokurage's manga adaptation was the tenth best-selling volume, with 566,342 copies sold. The 16th volume of Nekokurage's manga adaptation was the fifth best-selling manga volume of the first half of 2026, with 474,092 copies sold.

Nekokurage’s manga appeared in several rankings introduced by Billboard Japan in 2026—which account for physical and digital sales, as well as library loans and social media popularity. In the Hot Shot Books chart, which tracks books with the most significant commercial growth and increase in popularity, the 17th volume reached the thirteenth spot. In the Hot Manga chart, which ranks the top manga of the year, the volume 16 placed fourteenth. In the Book Hot 100, which ranks the top 100 best-selling books of the year, volumes 16 and 17 ranked 57th and 89th, respectively.

By November 2023, the franchise (including the light novel and its two manga adaptations) had over 27 million copies in circulation. By January 2024, the franchise had over 31 million copies in circulation. By September 2024, the franchise had over 38 million copies in circulation. By November 2025, the franchise had over 45 million copies in circulation. By August 2026, the franchise had over 57 million copies in circulation.

=== Critical response ===
In her review of the first novel for Anime News Network, Rebecca Silverman gave it an overall grade of B, writing: "It's an enjoyable read, one that gets better as it goes on, and if its pacing is a little too fast, it makes up for it in the way the characters interact and the story unfolds." However, she was more critical of it for lacking genre elements despite being a mystery story. Silverman also assigned the second novel a B grade, describing it as "still an engaging read" and calling Maomao a "wonderful, if at times abrasive, heroine who takes no garbage from anyone". Silverman subsequently reviewed volumes 3−6 of the work, rating them a B+. She highlighted the importance of interpersonal relationships in the series, stating that "every plotline and action is driven by how two people interact"; she praised the storytelling by noting that "everything is interconnected" and said that "every plot point builds on the one before it, creating a real sense of reading a single, long serialized story rather than one where the author is just being told to crank out more volumes."

In his review of the first volume of the manga adaptation for Anime News Network, Theron Martin gave it an overall grade of B+. He praised the art, characters and the use of historical details while noting several similarities with The Story of Saiunkoku. Silverman scored the second manga volume an A−. She described it as "excellent", praising the "beautiful" art, portrayal of Maomao as a legitimately strong female character, and overall continuity.

=== Accolades ===
In 2019, the manga adaptation by Nekokurage ranked ninth on AnimeJapan's "Most Wanted Anime Adaptation" poll. The manga adaptation won the Next Manga Award in the print category. It also ranked fifth on the "Nationwide Bookstore Employees' Recommended Comics of 2020", a list compiled by surveying professional bookstore employees around Japan. In 2024, the light novel and manga adaptation by Nekokurage won the Piccoma Award in their respective categories. The manga adaptation by Minoji Kurata was nominated for the 70th Shogakukan Manga Award in 2024. It won the Japan Society and Anime NYC's second American Manga Awards for Best Continuing Manga Series in 2025.
