= Crunchyroll Anime Award for Best Character =

- Awarded for: Best anime characters of the previous year
- Country: United States; Japan
- First award: Protagonist: Izuku "Deku" Midoriya — My Hero Academia; Antagonist: Gaku Yashiro — Erased; Boy: Yuri Katsuki — Yuri on Ice; Girl: Rem — Re:Zero – Starting Life in Another World; (2017)
- Currently held by: Main Character: Maomao — The Apothecary Diaries Season 2; Supporting Character: Katsuki Bakugo — My Hero Academia: Final Season; "Must Protect at All Costs" Character: Anya Forger — Spy × Family Season 3; (2026)

Highlights
- Most wins: Character: Anya Forger (5); Anime: My Hero Academia (8)
- Most nominations: Character: Izuku "Deku" Midoriya (7); Anime: My Hero Academia (18)
- Website: Crunchyroll Anime Awards

The Crunchyroll Anime Award for Best Character is a fictional character award given at the Crunchyroll Anime Awards since its inaugural edition in 2017. It is given for the best anime characters from the previous year. Winners are determined through a combined voting process by judges and public voting.

The award splits into four categories as individual characters (Best Protagonist, Best Antagonist, Best Boy, and Best Girl) until 2022, all of which will be consolidated into two categories: Best Main Character and Best Supporting Character, while introducing a new category "Must Protect at All Costs" Character, an award recognizes characters that evoke strong protective instincts in viewers due to their vulnerability or endearing qualities, inspire a strong desire to safeguard them at all costs.

Spy × Family's Anya Forger won the award multiple times, 1 for Best Supporting Character and 4 for "Must Protect at All Costs" Character, with the latter won in four consecutive years, the most of any anime characters to date. My Hero Academia holds the records for both the most wins (8) and nominations (18), with Izuku Midoriya received the most with 3 awards out of 7 nominations.

So far, My Hero Academia was the only series to received seven different categories overall, with Izuku Midoriya earned the most categories with four. Also, the second edition of the anime series earned six nominations in four former categories in a single edition, sweeps all its categories for the first time; the awards for Best Boy and Best Girl received two nominations.

In the latest edition in 2026, three awards were won by Maomao from the second season of The Apothecary Diaries in Best Main Character, Katsuki Bakugo from the eighth and final season of My Hero Academia in Best Supporting Character, and Anya Forger from the third season of Spy × Family in "Must Protect at All Costs" Character.

== Current ==
In the following list, the first names listed in gold are the winners; those not in gold are nominees, which are listed in alphabetical order. The years given are those in which the ceremonies took place.

=== Best Main Character ===
Year	Character	Anime
2021/2022 (7th)
2021/2022 (7th)	Eren Jaeger	Attack on Titan: The Final Season Part 2 (season 4 cour 2)
2021/2022 (7th)	Bojji	Ranking of Kings (cour 2)
2021/2022 (7th)	Chisato Nishikigi	Lycoris Recoil
2021/2022 (7th)	David Martinez	Cyberpunk: Edgerunners
2021/2022 (7th)	Loid Forger	Spy × Family
2021/2022 (7th)	Marin Kitagawa	My Dress-Up Darling
2022/2023 (8th)
2022/2023 (8th)	Monkey D. Luffy	One Piece
2022/2023 (8th)	Denji	Chainsaw Man
2022/2023 (8th)	Eren Jaeger	Attack on Titan: The Final Season The Final Chapters Special 1 (season 4 cour 3)
2022/2023 (8th)	Hitori "Bocchi" Gotoh	Bocchi the Rock!
2022/2023 (8th)	Shigeo "Mob" Kageyama	Mob Psycho 100 III (season 3)
2022/2023 (8th)	Thorfinn	Vinland Saga (season 2)
2023/2024 (9th)
2023/2024 (9th)	Sung Jin-woo	Solo Leveling
2023/2024 (9th)	Frieren	Frieren: Beyond Journey's End
2023/2024 (9th)	Kafka Hibino	Kaiju No. 8
2023/2024 (9th)	Ken "Okarun" Takakura	Dandadan
2023/2024 (9th)	Maomao	The Apothecary Diaries
2023/2024 (9th)	Momo Ayase	Dandadan
2025 (10th)
2025 (10th)	Maomao	The Apothecary Diaries (season 2)
2025 (10th)	Izuku "Deku" Midoriya	My Hero Academia: Final Season (season 8)
2025 (10th)	Ken "Okarun" Takakura	Dandadan (season 2)
2025 (10th)	Momo Ayase	Dandadan (season 2)
2025 (10th)	Rudo Surebrec	Gachiakuta
2025 (10th)	Sung Jin-woo	Solo Leveling: Arise from the Shadow (season 2)

=== Best Supporting Character ===
Year	Character	Anime
2021/2022 (7th)
2021/2022 (7th)	Anya Forger	Spy × Family
2021/2022 (7th)	Ai Hayasaka	Kaguya-sama: Love Is War – Ultra Romantic
2021/2022 (7th)	Kage	Ranking of Kings
2021/2022 (7th)	Rebecca	Cyberpunk: Edgerunners
2021/2022 (7th)	Tengen Uzui	Demon Slayer: Kimetsu no Yaiba Entertainment District Arc (season 2 cour 2)
2021/2022 (7th)	Yor Forger	Spy × Family
2022/2023 (8th)
2022/2023 (8th)	Satoru Gojo	Jujutsu Kaisen (season 2)
2022/2023 (8th)	Arataka Reigen	Mob Psycho 100 III (season 3)
2022/2023 (8th)	Zoë Hange	Attack on Titan: The Final Season The Final Chapters Special 1 (season 4 cour 3)
2022/2023 (8th)	Kana Arima	Oshi no Ko
2022/2023 (8th)	Power	Chainsaw Man
2022/2023 (8th)	Suguru Geto	Jujutsu Kaisen (season 2)
2023/2024 (9th)
2023/2024 (9th)	Fern	Frieren: Beyond Journey's End
2023/2024 (9th)	Himmel	Frieren: Beyond Journey's End
2023/2024 (9th)	Jinshi	The Apothecary Diaries
2023/2024 (9th)	Seiko Ayase	Dandadan
2023/2024 (9th)	Senshi	Delicious in Dungeon
2023/2024 (9th)	Turbo Granny	Dandadan
2025 (10th)
2025 (10th)	Katsuki Bakugo	My Hero Academia: Final Season (season 8)
2025 (10th)	Enjin	Gachiakuta
2025 (10th)	Jin "Jiji" Enjoji	Dandadan (season 2)
2025 (10th)	Jinshi	The Apothecary Diaries (season 2)
2025 (10th)	Loulan/Shisui	The Apothecary Diaries (season 2)
2025 (10th)	Turbo Granny	Dandadan (season 2)

=== "Must Protect at All Costs" Character ===
Year	Character	Anime
2021/2022 (7th)
2021/2022 (7th)	Anya Forger	Spy × Family
2021/2022 (7th)	Bojji	Ranking of Kings (cour 2)
2021/2022 (7th)	Kage	Ranking of Kings
2021/2022 (7th)	Komi Shōko	Komi Can't Communicate
2021/2022 (7th)	Kotaro Satō	Kotaro Lives Alone
2021/2022 (7th)	Marin Kitagawa	My Dress-Up Darling
2022/2023 (8th)
2022/2023 (8th)	Anya Forger	Spy × Family (season 1 cour 2)
2022/2023 (8th)	Bojji	Ranking of Kings: The Treasure Chest of Courage
2022/2023 (8th)	Hitori "Bocchi" Gotoh	Bocchi the Rock!
2022/2023 (8th)	Miri Unasaka	Buddy Daddies
2022/2023 (8th)	Pochita	Chainsaw Man
2022/2023 (8th)	Suletta Mercury	Mobile Suit Gundam: The Witch from Mercury
2023/2024 (9th)
2023/2024 (9th)	Anya Forger	Spy × Family (season 2)
2023/2024 (9th)	Frieren	Frieren: Beyond Journey's End
2023/2024 (9th)	Hōjō Tokiyuki	The Elusive Samurai
2023/2024 (9th)	Ken "Okarun" Takakura	Dandadan
2023/2024 (9th)	Senshi	Delicious in Dungeon
2023/2024 (9th)	Yuki Itose	A Sign of Affection
2025 (10th)
2025 (10th)	Anya Forger	Spy × Family (season 3)
2025 (10th)	Izuku "Deku" Midoriya	My Hero Academia: Final Season (season 8)
2025 (10th)	Kaoruko Waguri	The Fragrant Flower Blooms with Dignity
2025 (10th)	Maomao	The Apothecary Diaries (season 2)
2025 (10th)	Suika	Dr. Stone: Science Future (season 4)
2025 (10th)	Takopi	Takopi's Original Sin

== Former ==
In the following list, the first names listed in gold are the winners; those not in gold are nominees, which are listed in alphabetical order. The years given are those in which the ceremonies took place.

=== Best Protagonist ===
Year	Character	Anime
2016 (1st)
2016 (1st)	Izuku "Deku" Midoriya	My Hero Academia
2016 (1st)	Mumei	Kabaneri of the Iron Fortress
2016 (1st)	Satoru Fujinuma	Erased
2016 (1st)	Shigeo "Mob" Kageyama	Mob Psycho 100
2016 (1st)	Most Popular "Other": Josuke Higashikata	JoJo's Bizarre Adventure: Diamond Is Unbreakable (season 3)
2017 (2nd)
2017 (2nd)	Izuku "Deku" Midoriya	My Hero Academia (season 2)
2017 (2nd)	Atsuko "Akko" Kagari	Little Witch Academia
2017 (2nd)	Chise Hatori	The Ancient Magus' Bride
2017 (2nd)	Gin Minowa	Yuki Yuna is a Hero
2017 (2nd)	Kukuri	Magical Circle Guru Guru
2017 (2nd)	Nanachi	Made in Abyss
2018 (3rd)
2018 (3rd)	Rimuru Tempest	That Time I Got Reincarnated as a Slime
2018 (3rd)	Joe	Megalobox
2018 (3rd)	Retsuko	Aggretsuko
2018 (3rd)	Sakuta Azusagawa	Rascal Does Not Dream of Bunny Girl Senpai
2018 (3rd)	Violet Evergarden	Violet Evergarden
2018 (3rd)	Yumeko Jabami	Kakegurui – Compulsive Gambler
2019 (4th)
2019 (4th)	Senku Ishigami	Dr. Stone
2019 (4th)	Emma	The Promised Neverland
2019 (4th)	Hyakkimaru	Dororo
2019 (4th)	Saitama	One-Punch Man (season 2)
2019 (4th)	Tanjiro Kamado	Demon Slayer: Kimetsu no Yaiba
2019 (4th)	Tohru Honda	Fruits Basket
2020 (5th)
2020 (5th)	Catarina Claes	My Next Life as a Villainess: All Routes Lead to Doom!
2020 (5th)	Anos Voldigoad	The Misfit of Demon King Academy
2020 (5th)	Midori Asakusa	Keep Your Hands Off Eizouken!
2020 (5th)	Natsume	Deca-Dence
2020 (5th)	Shoyo Hinata	Haikyu!! To the Top (season 4)
2020 (5th)	Yuji Itadori	Jujutsu Kaisen
2021 (6th)
2021 (6th)	Odokawa	Odd Taxi
2021 (6th)	Ai Ohto	Wonder Egg Priority
2021 (6th)	Bojji	Ranking of Kings
2021 (6th)	Eren Jaeger	Attack on Titan: The Final Season Part 1 (season 4)
2021 (6th)	Joe	Megalobox 2: Nomad
2021 (6th)	Yuji Itadori	Jujutsu Kaisen (cour 2)

=== Best Antagonist ===
Year	Character	Anime
2016 (1st)
2016 (1st)	Gaku Yashiro	Erased
2016 (1st)	Biba	Kabaneri of the Iron Fortress
2016 (1st)	Tomura Shigaraki	My Hero Academia
2016 (1st)	Yoshikage Kira	JoJo's Bizarre Adventure: Diamond Is Unbreakable (season 3)
2016 (1st)	Most Popular "Other": Betelgeuse	Re:Zero − Starting Life in Another World
2017 (2nd)
2017 (2nd)	Stain	My Hero Academia (season 2)
2017 (2nd)	Bondrewd	Made in Abyss
2017 (2nd)	Cartaphilus	The Ancient Magus' Bride
2017 (2nd)	Hiro Shishigami	Inuyashiki
2017 (2nd)	Tanya Degurechaff	Saga of Tanya the Evil
2017 (2nd)	Usagi	Juni Taisen: Zodiac War
2018 (3rd)
2018 (3rd)	All For One	My Hero Academia (season 3)
2018 (3rd)	Akane Shinjo	SSSS.Gridman
2018 (3rd)	Momonga	Overlord (season 3)
2018 (3rd)	Ryo Asuka	Devilman Crybaby
2018 (3rd)	Tokushiro Tsurumi	Golden Kamuy
2018 (3rd)	Yuri	Megalobox
2019 (4th)
2019 (4th)	Isabella	The Promised Neverland
2019 (4th)	Ai Magase	Babylon
2019 (4th)	Angela Carpenter	Carole & Tuesday
2019 (4th)	Askeladd	Vinland Saga
2019 (4th)	Garou	One-Punch Man (season 2)
2019 (4th)	Overhaul	My Hero Academia (season 4)
2020 (5th)
2020 (5th)	Ryomen Sukuna	Jujutsu Kaisen
2020 (5th)	Akito Soma	Fruits Basket (season 2)
2020 (5th)	Echidna	Re:Zero − Starting Life in Another World (season 2)
2020 (5th)	En	Dorohedoro
2020 (5th)	Overhaul	My Hero Academia (season 4)
2020 (5th)	Rachel	Tower of God
2021 (6th)
2021 (6th)	Eren Jaeger	Attack on Titan: The Final Season Part 1 (season 4)
2021 (6th)	Ainosuke Shindo	SK8 the Infinity
2021 (6th)	Echidna	Re:Zero − Starting Life in Another World (season 2)
2021 (6th)	Tetta Kisaki	Tokyo Revengers
2021 (6th)	Tomura Shigaraki	My Hero Academia (season 5)
2021 (6th)	Yano	Odd Taxi

=== Best Boy ===
Year	Character	Anime
2016 (1st)
2016 (1st)	Yuri Katsuki	Yuri on Ice
2016 (1st)	Arataka Reigen	Mob Psycho 100
2016 (1st)	Izuku "Deku" Midoriya	My Hero Academia
2016 (1st)	Yakumo Yuurakutei	Descending Stories: Showa Genroku Rakugo Shinju
2016 (1st)	Most Popular "Other": Josuke Higashikata	JoJo's Bizarre Adventure: Diamond Is Unbreakable (season 3)
2017 (2nd)
2017 (2nd)	Shoto Todoroki	My Hero Academia (season 2)
2017 (2nd)	Fafnir	Miss Kobayashi's Dragon Maid
2017 (2nd)	Izuku "Deku" Midoriya	My Hero Academia (season 2)
2017 (2nd)	Kazuma Sato	KonoSuba: God's Blessing on This Wonderful World! (season 2)
2017 (2nd)	Rei Kiriyama	March Comes In like a Lion
2017 (2nd)	Yakumo Yuurakutei	Descending Stories: Showa Genroku Rakugo Shinju
2018 (3rd)
2018 (3rd)	Izuku "Deku" Midoriya	My Hero Academia (season 3)
2018 (3rd)	Haida	Aggretsuko
2018 (3rd)	Honda-san	Skull-face Bookseller Honda-san
2018 (3rd)	Joe	Megalobox
2018 (3rd)	Kotaro Tatsumi	Zombie Land Saga
2018 (3rd)	Sakuta Azusagawa	Rascal Does Not Dream of Bunny Girl Senpai
2019 (4th)
2019 (4th)	Tanjiro Kamado	Demon Slayer: Kimetsu no Yaiba
2019 (4th)	Bruno Bucciarati	JoJo's Bizarre Adventure: Golden Wind (season 4)
2019 (4th)	Hyakkimaru	Dororo
2019 (4th)	Kanata Hoshijima	Astra Lost in Space
2019 (4th)	Naruzo Machio	How Heavy Are the Dumbbells You Lift?
2019 (4th)	Shigeo "Mob" Kageyama	Mob Psycho 100 II (season 2)
2020 (5th)
2020 (5th)	Shoyo Hinata	Haikyu!! To the Top (season 4)
2020 (5th)	Anos Voldigoad	The Misfit of Demon King Academy
2020 (5th)	Caiman	Dorohedoro
2020 (5th)	Khun Aguero Agnes	Tower of God
2020 (5th)	Legoshi	Beastars
2020 (5th)	Satoru Gojo	Jujutsu Kaisen
2021 (6th)
2021 (6th)	Bojji	Ranking of Kings
2021 (6th)	Izumi Miyamura	Horimiya
2021 (6th)	Ken 'Draken' Ryuguji	Tokyo Revengers
2021 (6th)	Manjiro 'Mikey' Sano	Tokyo Revengers
2021 (6th)	Odokawa	Odd Taxi
2021 (6th)	Senku Ishigami	Dr. Stone (season 2)

=== Best Girl ===
Year	Character	Anime
2016 (1st)
2016 (1st)	Rem	Re:Zero − Starting Life in Another World
2016 (1st)	Mumei	Kabaneri of the Iron Fortress
2016 (1st)	Nico Niiyama	Kiznaiver
2016 (1st)	Ochaco Uraraka	My Hero Academia
2016 (1st)	Most Popular "Other": Megumin	KonoSuba: God's Blessing on This Wonderful World!
2017 (2nd)
2017 (2nd)	Ochaco Uraraka	My Hero Academia (season 2)
2017 (2nd)	Atsuko "Akko" Kagari	Little Witch Academia
2017 (2nd)	Chise Hatori	The Ancient Magus' Bride
2017 (2nd)	Moriko Morioka	Recovery of an MMO Junkie
2017 (2nd)	Serval	Kemono Friends
2017 (2nd)	Tsuyu Asui	My Hero Academia (season 2)
2018 (3rd)
2018 (3rd)	Mai Sakurajima	Rascal Does Not Dream of Bunny Girl Senpai
2018 (3rd)	Anzu Hayashi	Hinamatsuri
2018 (3rd)	Asirpa	Golden Kamuy
2018 (3rd)	Hinata Miyake	A Place Further than the Universe
2018 (3rd)	Lily Hoshikawa	Zombie Land Saga
2018 (3rd)	Nadeshiko Kagamihara	Laid-Back Camp
2019 (4th)
2019 (4th)	Raphtalia	The Rising of the Shield Hero
2019 (4th)	Carole	Carole & Tuesday
2019 (4th)	Chika Fujiwara	Kaguya-sama: Love Is War
2019 (4th)	Emma	The Promised Neverland
2019 (4th)	Kohaku	Dr. Stone
2019 (4th)	Nezuko Kamado	Demon Slayer: Kimetsu no Yaiba
2020 (5th)
2020 (5th)	Kaguya Shinomiya	Kaguya-sama: Love Is War? (season 2)
2020 (5th)	Abigail Jones	Great Pretender
2020 (5th)	Catarina Claes	My Next Life as a Villainess: All Routes Lead to Doom!
2020 (5th)	Chizuru Mizuhara	Rent-A-Girlfriend
2020 (5th)	Noi	Dorohedoro
2020 (5th)	Sayaka Kanamori	Keep Your Hands Off Eizouken!
2021 (6th)
2021 (6th)	Nobara Kugisaki	Jujutsu Kaisen (cour 2)
2021 (6th)	Ai Ohto	Wonder Egg Priority
2021 (6th)	Komi Shōko	Komi Can't Communicate
2021 (6th)	Sarasa Watanabe	Kageki Shojo!!
2021 (6th)	Tohru Honda	Fruits Basket The Final Season
2021 (6th)	Vladilena Milizé	86

== Records ==
=== Anime characters ===
BOLD indicates the winner

Wins	Nominations	Character
5		Anya Forger
3	7	Izuku "Deku" Midoriya
2	4	Eren Jaeger
1	5	Bojji
1	3	Maomao
1	2	Catarina Claes
1	2	Ochaco Uraraka
1	2	Odokawa
1	2	Satoru Gojo
1	2	Senku Ishigami
1	2	Shoyo Hinata
1	2	Sung Jin-woo
1	2	Tanjiro Kamado
0	3	Joe
0	3	Ken "Okarun" Takakura
0	3	Shigeo "Mob" Kageyama
0	2	Ai Ohto
0	2	Anos Voldigoad
0	2	Atsuko "Akko" Kagari
0	2	Chise Hatori
0	2	Echidna
0	2	Emma
0	2	Frieren
0	2	Hitori "Bocchi" Gotoh
0	2	Hyakkimaru
0	2	Jinshi
0	2	Kage
0	2	Komi Shōko
0	2	Marin Kitagawa
0	2	Momo Ayase
0	2	Mumei
0	2	Overhaul
0	2	Sakuta Azusagawa
0	2	Senshi
0	2	Tomura Shigaraki
0	2	Turbo Granny
0	2	Yuji Itadori

=== Anime series ===
BOLD indicates the winner

Wins	Nominations	Anime
8	18	My Hero Academia
5	7	Spy × Family
3	7	Jujutsu Kaisen
2	5	Attack on Titan
1	7	Ranking of Kings
1	6	The Apothecary Diaries
1	4	Demon Slayer: Kimetsu no Yaiba
1	4	Frieren: Beyond Journey's End
1	4	Re:Zero − Starting Life in Another World
1	3	Dr. Stone
1	3	Kaguya-sama: Love Is War
1	3	Odd Taxi
1	3	The Promised Neverland
1	3	Rascal Does Not Dream of Bunny Girl Senpai
1	2	Solo Leveling
0	9	Dandadan
0	5	Mob Psycho 100
0	4	JoJo's Bizarre Adventure
0	4	Megalobox
0	3	Chainsaw Man
0	2	Bocchi the Rock!
0	2	Cyberpunk: Edgerunners
0	2	Gachiakuta
0	2	My Dress-Up Darling

=== Single edition ===
Edition	Anime	Characters (Categories)	Nominations	Wins
1st	My Hero Academia	Izuku "Deku" Midoriya (**Best Protagonist** and Best Boy); Tomura Shigaraki (Best Antagonist); Ochaco Uraraka (Best Girl)	4	1
1st	JoJo's Bizarre Adventure: Diamond Is Unbreakable	Josuke Higashikata (Best Protagonist and Best Boy); Yoshikage Kira (Best Antagonist)	3	0
1st	Kabaneri of the Iron Fortress	Mumei (Best Protagonist and Best Girl); Biba (Best Antagonist)	3	0
1st	Erased	Satoru Fujinuma (Best Protagonist); Gaku Yashiro (**Best Antagonist**)	2	1
1st	Re:Zero − Starting Life in Another World	Betelgeuse (Best Antagonist); Rem (**Best Girl**)	2	1
1st	Mob Psycho 100	Shigeo "Mob" Kageyama (Best Protagonist); Arataka Reigen (Best Boy)	2	0
2nd	My Hero Academia (season 2)	Izuku "Deku" Midoriya (**Best Protagonist** and Best Boy); Stain (**Best Antagonist**); Shoto Todoroki (**Best Boy**); Ochaco Uraraka (**Best Girl**); Tsuyu Asui (Best Girl)	6	4
2nd	The Ancient Magus' Bride	Chise Hatori (Best Protagonist and Best Girl)	3	0
2nd	Little Witch Academia	Atsuko "Akko" Kagari (Best Protagonist and Best Girl)	2	0
2nd	Made in Abyss	Nanachi (Best Protagonist); Bondrewd (Best Antagonist)	2	0
3rd	Rascal Does Not Dream of Bunny Girl Senpai	Sakuta Azusagawa (Best Protagonist and Best Boy); Mai Sakurajima (**Best Girl**)	3	1
3rd	Megalobox	Joe (Best Protagonist and Best Boy); Yuri (Best Antagonist)	3	0
3rd	My Hero Academia (season 3)	All For One (**Best Antagonist**); Izuku "Deku" Midoriya (**Best Boy**)	2	2
3rd	Aggretsuko	Retsuko (Best Protagonist); Haida (Best Boy)	2	0
3rd	Golden Kamuy	Tokushiro Tsurumi (Best Antagonist); Asirpa (Best Girl)	2	0
3rd	Zombie Land Saga	Kotaro Tatsumi (Best Boy); Lily Hoshikawa (Best Girl)	2	0
4th	Demon Slayer: Kimetsu no Yaiba	Tanjiro Kamado (Best Protagonist and **Best Boy**); Nezuko Kamado (Best Girl)	3	1
4th	The Promised Neverland	Emma (Best Protagonist and Best Girl); Isabella (**Best Antagonist**)	3	1
4th	Dr. Stone	Senku Ishigami (**Best Protagonist**); Kohaku (Best Girl)	2	1
4th	Carole & Tuesday	Angela Carpenter (Best Antagonist); Carole (Best Girl)	2	0
4th	Dororo	Hyakkimaru (Best Protagonist and Best Boy)	2	0
4th	One-Punch Man (season 2)	Saitama (Best Protagonist); Garou (Best Antagonist)	2	0
5th	Jujutsu Kaisen (cour 1)	Yuji Itadori (Best Protagonist); Ryomen Sukuna (**Best Antagonist**); Satoru Gojo (Best Boy)	3	1
5th	Dorohedoro	En (Best Antagonist); Caiman (Best Boy); Noi (Best Girl)	3	0
5th	Haikyu!! To the Top (season 4)	Shoyo Hinata (Best Protagonist and **Best Boy**)	2	1
5th	My Next Life as a Villainess: All Routes Lead to Doom!	Catarina Claes (**Best Protagonist** and Best Girl)	2	1
5th	Keep Your Hands Off Eizouken!	Midori Asakusa (Best Protagonist); Sayaka Kanamori (Best Girl)	2	0
5th	The Misfit of Demon King Academy	Anos Voldigoad (Best Protagonist and Best Boy)	2	0
5th	Tower of God	Rachel (Best Antagonist); Khun Aguero Agnes (Best Boy)	2	0
6th	Odd Taxi	Odokawa (**Best Protagonist** and Best Boy); Yano (Best Antagonist)	3	1
6th	Tokyo Revengers	Tetta Kisaki (Best Antagonist); Ken 'Draken' Ryuguji (Best Boy); Manjiro 'Mikey' Sano (Best Boy)	3	0
6th	Attack on Titan (The Final Season Part 1)	Eren Jaeger (Best Protagonist and **Best Antagonist**)	2	1
6th	Jujutsu Kaisen (cour 2)	Yuji Itadori (Best Protagonist); Nobara Kugisaki (**Best Girl**)	2	1
6th	Ranking of Kings	Bojji (Best Protagonist and **Best Boy**)	2	1
6th	Wonder Egg Priority	Ai Ohto (Best Protagonist and Best Girl)	2	0
7th	Spy × Family	Loid Forger (Best Main Character); Anya Forger (**Best Supporting Character** and **"Must Protect at All Costs" Character**); Yor Forger (Best Supporting Character)	4	2
7th	Ranking of Kings (cour 2)	Bojji (Best Main Character and "Must Protect at All Costs" Character); Kage (Best Supporting Character and "Must Protect at All Costs" Character)	4	0
7th	Cyberpunk: Edgerunners	David Martinez (Best Main Character); Rebecca (Best Supporting Character)	2	0
7th	My Dress-Up Darling	Marin Kitagawa (Best Main Character and "Must Protect at All Costs" Character)	2	0
8th	Chainsaw Man	Denji (Best Main Character); Power (Best Supporting Character); Pochita ("Must Protect at All Costs" Character)	3	0
8th	Jujutsu Kaisen (season 2)	Satoru Gojo (**Best Supporting Character**); Suguru Geto (Best Supporting Character)	2	1
8th	Attack on Titan (The Final Season The Final Chapters Special 1)	Eren Jaeger (Best Main Character); Zoë Hange (Best Supporting Character)	2	0
8th	Bocchi the Rock!	Hitori "Bocchi" Gotoh (Best Main Character and "Must Protect at All Costs" Character)	2	0
8th	Mob Psycho 100 III (season 3)	Shigeo "Mob" Kageyama (Best Main Character); Arataka Reigen (Best Supporting Character)	2	0
9th	Dandadan	Ken "Okarun" Takakura (Best Main Character and "Must Protect At All Costs" Character); Momo Ayase (Best Main Character); Seiko Ayase (Best Supporting Character); Turbo Granny (Best Supporting Character)	5	0
9th	Frieren: Beyond Journey's End	Frieren (Best Main Character and "Must Protect at All Costs" Character); Fern (**Best Supporting Character**); Himmel (Best Supporting Character)	4	1
9th	The Apothecary Diaries	Maomao (Best Main Character); Jinshi (Best Supporting Character)	2	0
9th	Delicious in Dungeon	Senshi (Best Supporting Character and "Must Protect at All Costs" Character)	2	0
10th	Dandadan (season 2)	Ken "Okarun" Takakura (Best Main Character); Momo Ayase (Best Main Character); Jin "Jiji" Enjoji (Best Supporting Character); Turbo Granny (Best Supporting Character)	4	0
10th	The Apothecary Diaries (season 2)	Maomao (**Best Main Character** and "Must Protect at All Costs" Character); Jinshi (Best Supporting Character); Loulan/Shisui (Best Supporting Character)	4	1
10th	My Hero Academia (Final Season)	Izuku "Deku" Midoriya (Best Main Character and "Must Protect at All Costs" Character); Katsuki Bakugo (**Best Supporting Character**)	3	1
10th	Gachiakuta	Rudo Surebrec (Best Main Character); Enjin (Best Supporting Character)	2	0

=== Consecutive wins ===
Category	Character	Anime	No. of wins
Current
Best Main Character	—		
Best Supporting Character	—		
"Must Protect At All Costs" Character	Anya Forger	Spy × Family	4
Former
Best Protagonist	Izuku "Deku" Midoriya	My Hero Academia	2
Best Antagonist	—		
Best Boy	—		
Best Girl	—		
