= Senku Ishigami =

Fictional character from Dr. Stone

- Dr. Stone character
- Senku Ishigami, as illustrated by Boichi
- First appearance: Dr. Stone chapter #1: "Stone World", March 6, 2017 (Weekly Shōnen Jump 2017 #14)
- Created by: Riichiro Inagaki
- Designed by: Boichi
- Voiced by: Japanese: Yūsuke Kobayashi; Mikako Komatsu (child); English: Aaron Dismuke; Mikaela Krantz (child)

In-universe information
- Title(s): Village chief (formerly), leader and member of five-wise commanders, founder of kingdom of science
- Occupation: Student, scientist, inventor, astronomer, astronaut, engineer
- Spouse: Ruri (divorced)
- Relatives: Byakuya Ishigami (adopted Father, deceased)
- Nationality: Japanese
- Position: Village chief (formerly) general (active, under the members of the five wise generals)

Senku Ishigami (Japanese: 石神 千空, Hepburn: Ishigami Senkū) is the protagonist from Riichiro Inagaki and Boichi's manga series Dr. Stone. Senku is a 16-year old genius who awakens in April 5738 CE, 3,700 years after a mysterious flash petrified nearly all human life. He finds a world where all traces of human civilization have been eroded by time. Senku sets up a base camp and begins studying the petrified humans to determine the cause of the event and rebuild civilization.

Senku was created by Inagaki to be a unique type of superhero who, despite lacking supernatural powers, relies on his scientific knowledge to help rebuild civilization. He was based on the antagonistic Agon Kongo from Eyeshield 21, whom the author wanted to portray in a more positive way. In the anime adaptation, he is voiced by Yūsuke Kobayashi in Japanese and Aaron Dismuke in the English dub.

Senku's character has received a positive critical response, appearing in multiple popularity polls and winning the Best Protagonist award at the 4th Crunchyroll Anime Awards for. Critics praised Senku's personality, his relationships with supporting characters and his rivalry with Tsukasa Shishio.

== Creation and development ==
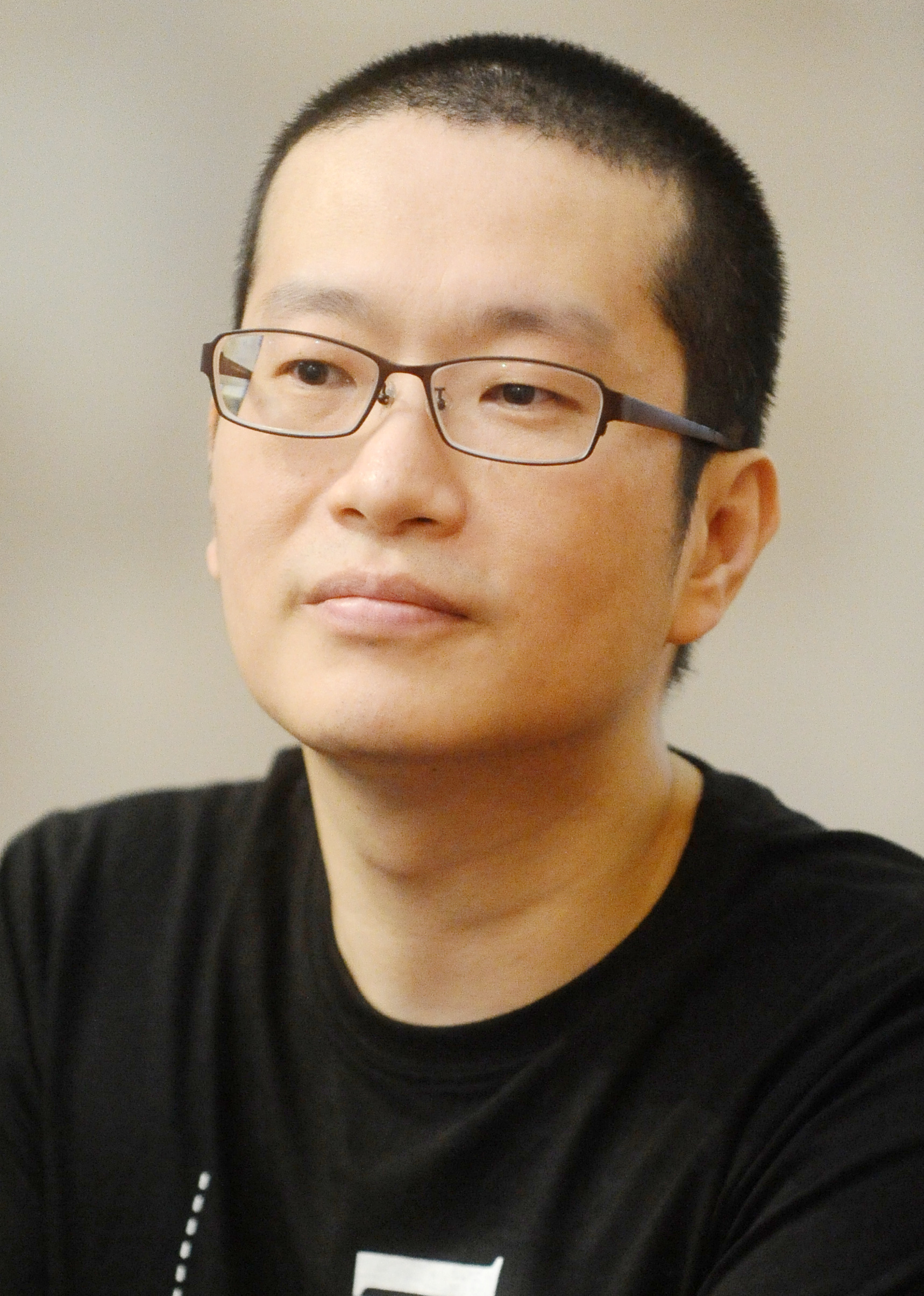
Boichi designed Senku.

Riichiro Inagaki created Senku as an unconventional type of superhero, one who does not possess any supernatural powers. Inagaki considered the perspective of an average person and the persistence and gradual progress needed to achieve their goals. He wanted to portray this idea through a character who represents diligent work over an extended period of time. The concept of petrification was used to amplify this theme, with Senku continuing to work towards a goal even after millennia. Inagaki also sought to make Senku a distinctive character within the manga, referring to the rest of the cast as "non-Senku" characters while exploring how they develop relationships and bonds with him.

Originally, Senku was named Gaku (學), meaning "study". However, Inagaki felt this name was too academic and changed it to Senku (千空), meaning "thousand skies". Inagaki also stated that Senku would never develop fantasy powers as it would contradict the realistic setting established from the beginning of the series.

Inagaki creates characters using a method that he refers to as "acting". He often reuses established character archetypes in new settings for his works. In the case of Senku, he reused elements of Agon, a character from his previous serialization Eyeshield 21. Inagaki has stated that he likes the type of curt, no-nonsense character shared by Agon and Senku. However, as Agon is an antagonist, Inagaki wanted to portray a similar archetype in a more positive role in Dr. Stone. The scientific focus of the series required Inagaki to adhere closely to reality real-world scientific concepts, which often required research. To make Senku appear more impressive, Inagaki would ask Boichi to draw backgrounds when Senku develops inventions or acquires materials, such as the "Hydroelectric power plant acquired!!" scene.

Voice actor Yūsuke Kobayashi mentioned that the intonation of the names were not clear until they started recording. Kobayashi also voiced Mecha Senku. Before voicing Senku for the English dub, Aaron Dismuke watched the original Japanese episodes to capture the feeling of the original work, which he found challenging. Dismuke further commented that Senku has a tendency to make expositions of creating items such as preparing meals to the point Senku is "all over the place".

== Appearances ==
Senku is a prodigy who excels in multiple fields of science, with a special love of astronomy and space exploration. In the series' beginning causes Senku and the entire population to be petrified for thousands of years. After awakening in the "Stone World", he sets to restore civilization by reinventing their lost technology and discovering a "cure" for the petrification. Though somewhat arrogant, he is actually very noble and kind-hearted as he considers science as a means to elevate all people and having unshakeable faith in his friends. Senku and Taiju prepare enough revival fluid to free one person from stone, with Taiju choosing Yuzuriha to be first subject. However, the recently revived Tsukasa reveals to Senku his intention to murder petrified adults to create a world free of corrupt adults, clashing with Senku's ideals of reviving everyone. As Senku relinquishes the recipe to save Yuzuriha and is given the choice of either abandoning science or dying, he recalls how he developed his love of science and became friends with Taiju. Refusing to abandon science, Senku prepares to die at Tsukasa's hands.

After faking his death to keep Tsukasa from hunting him, Senku befriends the residents of Ishigami Village and becomes their chief, finding out that he is a legend in the village's community at the same time thanks to the influence through one of the villagers' ancestors, who happens to be Senku's late adopted father Byakuya, one of the original petrification survivors. He meets sorcerer named Chrome who has come on his own Senku makes him his apprentice. Senku unveils the pile of tungsten for final preparation. After being crushed into a fine powder, it needs to be heated at an extremely high temperature for it to become usable. While Senku readies the tungsten powder, he charges Chrome and Kaseki to create a method of pinpoint high-temperature heating using everything they have learned since Senku's arrival in the village.

Tsukasa and Hyouga prepare for the upcoming attack on Ishigami Village. Senku discuss bringing more men from Tsukasa's Empire to their side. Following several battles, Senku demands a truce from Tsukasa in return for reviving his sister Mirai who Tsukasa learns is alive. Using the revival-fluid, Mirai is revived. Following Hyoga's defeat and Tsukasa entering cryosleep, Senku was able to get the remnants of the Empire of Might to merge with the Kingdom of Science where he leads the Five Wise Generals. Senku calls an assembly where he announces that they will find the secret of the petrification. He also reveals that they will construct a ship to explore the world.

== Reception ==
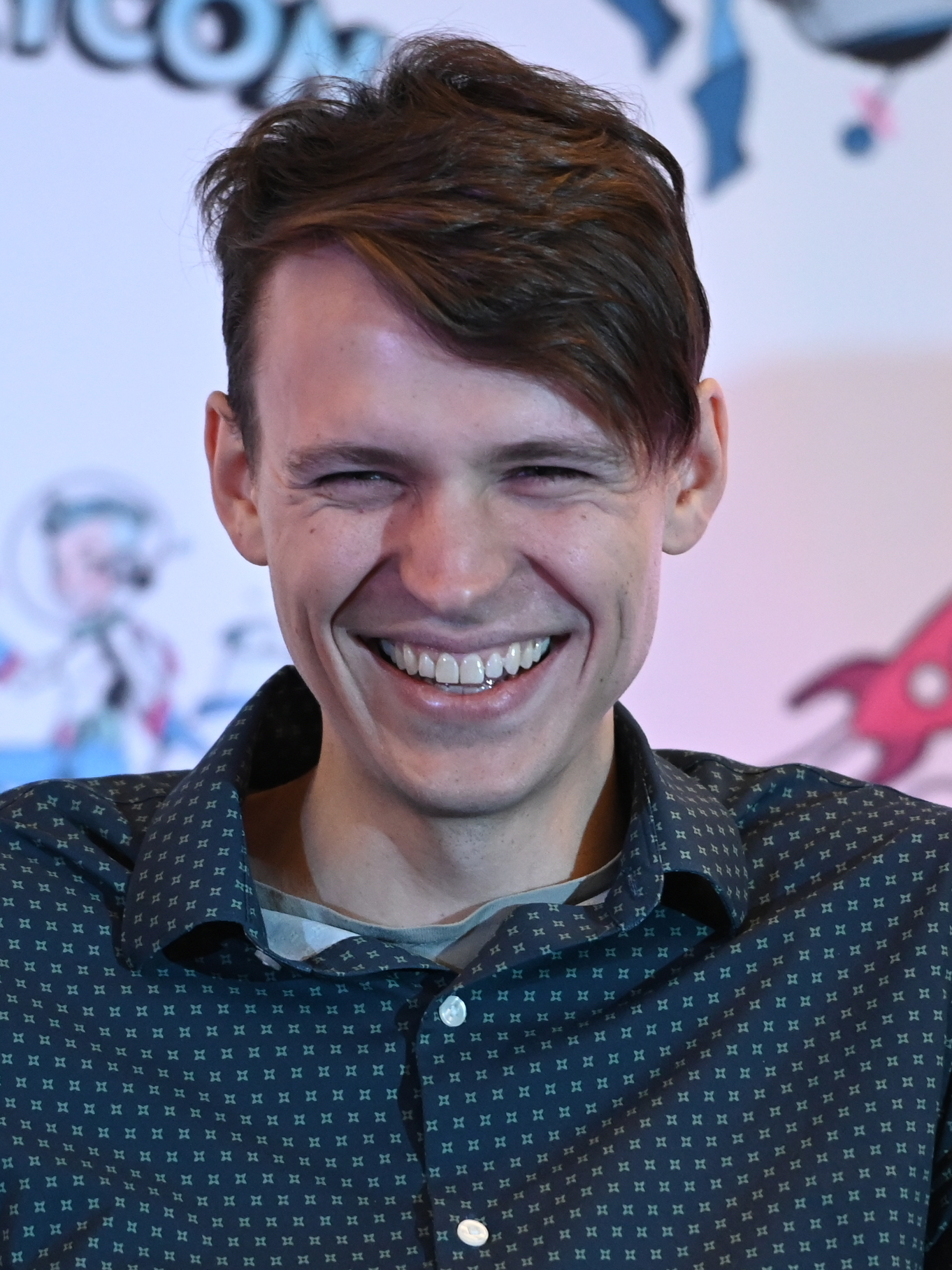
Aaron Dismuke has received praise for his performance as the English voice of Senku.

=== Popularity ===
Senku has been a popular character. Gadget Tsūshin listed Senku's catchphrase "This is exhilarating!" in their 2019 anime buzzwords list. At the 4th Crunchyroll Anime Awards in 2020, Senku was awarded Best Protagonist. Yūsuke Kobayashi's performance as Senku was one of the nominees for Best Voice Artist Performance (Japanese). He also topped both Western and Eastern Dr. Stone manga polls from 2019. Otaku USA regarded Senku as one of the smartest characters in anime. In another Crunchyroll poll, Senku was voted as the most popular character of the series. In 2022, he was also nominated at the 6th Crunchyroll Anime Awards in the "Best Boy" category, for his role in the Stone Wars season of Dr. Stone. Two of Senku's international voice actors were nominated for the "Best Voice Artist Performance" category at the eighth edition in 2024, namely Taleb Alrefai (Arabic) and David Brau (Castilian); the former won the award while the latter lost to Joel Gómez Jimenez's Denji, respectively.

=== Critical response ===
Critical response to Senku's character has been generally positive. Spin Maker website described Senku as a likable character, comparing him to a cross between MacGyver and Jimmy Neutron. Similarly, Manga.Tokyo described Senku as a mix between Dexter from Dexter's Laboratory and Rintaro Okabe from Steins;Gate, finding him to contrast the mad scientist archetype with his caring nature. Anime UK News found his design impressive, comparing his hair to that of Yugi Mutou, and felt that Senku's quest to restore modernity seems possible. Comic Book Resources found Senku to be balanced as despite his intelligence, Senku's strength is often downlplayed for comic relief as he finds it difficult to carry heavy objects. The same website made an entire article centered around Senku, calling him "a hero at heart though, not the reclusive, eccentric Dr. Frankenstein type" with derivations form little pleasure or meaning from deep personal connections.

Writers have commented on Senku's relationships portrayed in the narrative, most notably the members from Ishigami Village and his rivalry with Tsukasa. Initially, Manga.Tokyo said that the dynamic between Senku and Taiju was similar to Pinky and the Brain series and found that the duo has interesting interactions. Anime UK News also saw Senku's quest to increase the firepower of the Ishigami Village as a build up to the eventual second season which explores the fight against Tsukasa's forces. Otaquest and IGN praised Senku's characterization and actions in the plot as how he influences his student Chrome who has no knowledge of Senku's science.

Senku's rivalry with Tsukasa was also the focus of the series' themes involving science against strength, with Arius Raposas of Medium website regarding the second anime season as the most important parts it adapted. Furthermore, the website noted that the final twist in their war is controversial. Anime News Network noted that ever since the first volume, Boichi gave Senku and Tsukasa's rivalry a major effect and noted how Senku still the latter as a murderer even if his rival destroy humans' statues. Comic Book Bin enjoyed the clash in the ninth volume between such forces to the point of calling it the best part of the manga. Both of Senku's voice actors Aaron Dismuke's and Kobayashi's works as Senku's actors have been praised by the media. In an article by the Japanese AnimeAnime website, Senku was listed as the second best Kobayashi character behind Subaru Natsuki from Re:Zero − Starting Life in Another World.
