= Ranking of Kings =

Japanese manga series and its adaptation(s)

- First tankōbon volume cover, featuring Bojji (right) and Kage (left)

王様ランキング (Ōsama Rankingu)
- Genre: Coming-of-age; Fantasy comedy
- Manga
- Written by: Sōsuke Tōka
- Published by: Echoes; Enterbrain
- English publisher: NA: BookLive
- Imprint: Beam Comix
- Magazine: Manga Hack
- Original run: May 20, 2017 – present
- Volumes: 23
- Anime television series
- Directed by: Yōsuke Hatta; Makoto Fuchigami (Note: Chief Unit Director (チーフ演出))
- Produced by: Megumi Inoue; Kazuki Oshima; Maiko Okada
- Written by: Taku Kishimoto
- Music by: MAYUKO
- Studio: Wit Studio
- Licensed by: Crunchyroll; SEA: Medialink
- Original network: Fuji TV (Noitamina)
- English network: US: Crunchyroll Channel
- Original run: October 15, 2021 – March 25, 2022
- Episodes: 23
- Anime television series

Ranking of Kings: The Treasure Chest of Courage
- Directed by: Yōsuke Hatta; Makoto Fuchigami
- Produced by: Megumi Inoue; Kazuki Oshima; Maiko Okada
- Written by: Taku Kishimoto
- Music by: MAYUKO
- Studio: Wit Studio
- Licensed by: Crunchyroll; SEA: Medialink
- Original network: Fuji TV (Noitamina)
- Original run: April 14, 2023 – June 16, 2023
- Episodes: 10
- icon

Ranking of Kings (王様ランキング, Ōsama Rankingu) is a Japanese web manga series written and illustrated by Sōsuke Tōka. It has been serialized on Echoes' user-submitted Manga Hack website since May 2017 and has been collected in 23 tankōbon volumes by Enterbrain. The story follows the adventures of a little prince named Bojji, who was born deaf and tiny in size, and his friend Kage, a survivor of a wiped-out assassin clan, who understands Bojji's words despite him being unable to speak.

An anime television series adaptation produced by Wit Studio aired from October 2021 to March 2022 on Fuji TV's Noitamina programming block. The spin-off series Ranking of Kings: The Treasure Chest of Courage aired from April to June 2023.

An anime film adaptation has been announced.

== Synopsis ==
=== Setting ===
The title of the series refers to a same-named system by which a committee, acting in absentia for a race of powerful magical beings known as 'Gods', ranks the power and prosperity of the mortal world's many kings. The king that is bequeathed the number one ranking is entitled to a boon from the 'Divine Treasure Vault', a fabled stronghold brimming with untold riches and holy artifacts. While not all kings seek this power in earnest, the existence of the ranking and the ambitions of those who strive to sit atop it form the driving force of the narrative.

=== Plot ===
The story is about a little prince named Bojji who is deaf but above all naive, despite many criticisms from his people about his ascension to the throne, he does his best and dreams of becoming the greatest of kings. One day, he meets Kage (Shadow), a survivor of a wiped-out assassin clan, who understands his words despite Bojji being unable to speak due to his disability. The story follows the pair as they navigate the world and all of its adventures and darkness.

The inciting incident of the series' first arc is the death of Bojji's father, King Bosse, a legendary giant warrior who, in his prime, was widely renowned as the strongest man in the world. While Bojji's right to succession is affirmed by Bosse on his deathbed, there are those among the royal court that believe that Bojji's physical shortcomings make him unfit to rule and that his arrogant (but physically capable) younger half-brother, Prince Daida, is more suited for ascension. Chief among these dissenters is Bosse's widow and Daida's mother, Queen Hiling, who calls for a vote to circumvent Bosse's will and forgo Bojji's right to succession. The vote is passed and Daida is placed upon the throne.

Having been denied his birthright, Bojji requests he be allowed to undertake a journey so that he may gain experience and grow stronger. Hiling, who once had great affection for Bojji and regarded him as her own son, begrudgingly acquiesces. Unbeknownst to both of them, Daida, under the influence of an enigmatic figure, has set in motion a sinister plot to consolidate his power and achieve the position of number one in the Ranking of Kings.

== Characters ==
Bojji (ボッジ)
Voiced by: Minami Hinata (Japanese); Emily Fajardo (English)
The main protagonist of the story and the first prince of the Kingdom of Bosse. Born deaf and tiny in size, he was ridiculed and scorned openly by many within the palace and kingdom. Despite his disability, Bojji dreams of becoming a strong king like his father and always tries to maintain a smile in front of others. He is known for his kindness (which has earned him many unexpected allies), diligence, and intuition, which allows him to read lips and know what people are saying. He also possesses extreme agility and dodging ability unconventional for kings that tend to rely on strength, and like all members of his race is impervious to poison. Following Daida's coronation, he and Kage set off on a journey.
His name is a portmanteau of two Japanese words "Bocchi" (lonely) and "Ōji" (prince).
Kage (カゲ)
Voiced by: Ayumu Murase (Japanese); SungWon Cho, Emi Lo (young) (English)
A last surviving member of the shadow clan and Bojji's companion. Born to a clan of assassins, Kage was a young child when he witnessed his entire family murdered by the kingdom they served. He subsequently escaped and was exploited by a thug, who eventually sold him out for his ransom. Tempered by the rough way of the world, Kage then grew up using his clan's abilities to make a living off thieving. He eventually meets Bojji and is touched by his kindness and his situation, pledging to be his faithful friend. He is tasked by Bebin to follow and protect Bojji on their journey.
"Kage" in Japanese means "shadow".
Daida (ダイダ)
Voiced by: Yuki Kaji (Japanese); Justin Briner (English)
Bojji's younger half-brother, the birth son of Queen Hiling and the current king. Like Bojji, he is hardworking and resilient, but possesses a streak of pride and arrogance in his strength that seems to take after their father. Deep down, he is secretly jealous of his brother, who he believes was able to get everyone's love and the position of king without any effort. In the time leading up to his coronation, Daida is manipulated by a Magic Mirror and is forcibly made the vessel for Bosse's reincarnation.
Hiling (ヒリング, Hiringu)
Voiced by: Rina Satō (Japanese); Luci Christian (English)
The queen, Daida's mother, and Bojji's stepmother. She used to be more doting and affectionate to Bojji, but following Daida's birth, adopted a stricter and more practical-minded personality regarding royal affairs, ultimately deeming Bojji unfit for rule. Despite being highly critical of Bojji, she treasures him just as much as her birth son, often spending much energy to heal any injuries he sustains. She allows Bojji to go on his journey with Domas and Hokuro, setting their destination to be her parents' home.
Her name is from the English word "Healing"
Domas (ドーマス, Dōmasu)
Voiced by: Takuya Eguchi (Japanese); A.J. LoCascio (English)
The greatest swordsmaster in the Kingdom of Bosse, whose sword style reflects King Bosse's strength. He was assigned to be Bojji's tutor and while he treasures the prince very dearly, decided that he would never have power equivalent to his father and gave up on him. In an attempt to reaffirm his loyalty to a single lord, he pledges allegiance to Daida and attempts to assassinate Bojji by pushing him into the Hole of the Underworld. Overcome with regret, he cuts off his right hand later and rescues Hokuro from execution, intending to train him to become stronger.
His name derives from the Japanese pronunciation of the word "Sword Master".
Bebin (ベビン)
Voiced by: Yōji Ueda (Japanese); Christopher Wehkamp (English)
Daida's teacher who cares very deeply for his lord and has helped keep the Magic Mirror's deadly influence at bay. He wields a curved dagger, shuriken and is a snake tamer. Under Daida's orders, he tried to assassinate Apeas but was supposedly killed by the latter and sank through the ground, leaving his whereabouts unknown. He sends Kage to accompany Bojji and help him get stronger.
Apeas (アピス, Apisu)
Voiced by: Hiroki Yasumoto (Japanese); Luis Bermudez (English)
An expressionless commander dubbed "Spear of the King" who is part of the Big Four and heavily loyal to King Bosse. Once a cowardly man, he trained with monsters under the supervision of Miranjo and earned his current title. He worked with the Magic Mirror to transfer Bosse's consciousness to Daida's body.
His name is an anagram of the Japanese pronunciation of the word "Spear".
Dorshe (ドルーシ, Dorūshi)
Voiced by: Hinata Tadokoro (Japanese); Brent Mukai (English)
A large man dubbed "Shield of the Queen" who guards Hiling. He originally served King Bosse as 'King's Spear', but was later reassigned to guard the new queen, Hiling. Initially, he was upset by the decision but later was given the opportunity to decide whether or not Hiling was worth his protection, answering in the affirmative.
His name is an anagram of the Japanese pronunciation of the word "Shield".
Hokuro (ホクロ)
Voiced by: Daiki Yamashita (Japanese); Bryce Papenbrook (English)
A low-ranking knight who deeply cares for Bojji after the latter comforted him upon his mother's death. He was ordered to accompany Bojji on his journey and look after his personal care, being the only knight that knew sign language. After Domas' betrayal, his pride as a knight and loyalty to Bojji compel him to return to the kingdom, risking his life to inform Hiling of the news. He is rescued by Domas just before his execution and undergoes training to become stronger.
His name means "face mole" in Japanese.
Bosse (ボッス, Bossu)
Voiced by: Kenta Miyake (Japanese); Cris George (English)
The former king and father of Bojji and Daida. He was a giant who yearned to be the strongest man in the world and made a deal with a demon, choosing to steal power from his very own son. Feeling remorseful later, Bosse chose to become king and establish a country to ensure Bojji had everything he ever wanted in life. He is subsequently reincarnated in Daida's body.
His name is from the English word "Boss".
Shiina (シーナ, Shīna)
Voiced by: Takako Honda (Japanese); Laila Berzins (English)
Bosse's first wife and subsequent First Queen of the Bosse Kingdom, and Bojji's birth mother. She was killed by Miranjo when Bojji was young.
Miranjo/Magic Mirror (魔法の鏡役, Mahō no Kagami)
Voiced by: Maaya Sakamoto (Japanese); Brianna Roberts (English)
A mysterious mirror who advises Daida on his actions. Sealed within is actually the spirit of a woman named Miranjo, whose body is encased in ice within the palace's basement alongside various other deadly monsters. Miranjo has two masked guards who serve her and was previously involved in Apeas' training to become a high-ranking official. She describes herself as "someone who shared the joys and sorrows of [King Bosse]", later creating an elixir for Daida to become a vessel for reincarnation. Was later revealed to be the childhood friend of the devil but had an unwilling hand in what it became today. She is then devoured by the devil but is saved and forgiven by Daida after the latter learned the truth of her life.
Desha (デスハー, Desuhā)
Voiced by: Yoshimitsu Shimoyama (Japanese); Gabe Kunda (English)
The king of the Underworld and commander of the Order of the Underworld – the most powerful legion of soldiers that slaughter demons and prevent them from wreaking havoc. He has a complex about his face and wide mouth and dislikes his younger brother Despa due to his good looks. However, it does not stop both of them working together in some situations.
His name is an anagram of the name of god Hades from Greek mythology.
Ōken (オウケン)
Voiced by: Kōji Yusa (Japanese); Shawn Gann (English)
The younger brother of Desha and Despa and former commander of the Order of the Underworld. He once was a kind-hearted prince who swore to found an order of knights that shared his values. He also holds the title of 'Sword King of The Underworld' due to his master skills in swordsmanship. After unwillingly receiving true immortality, an ability that also slowly consumed his humanity, he became a remorseless monster that inflicts pain on his victims.
Due to his madness, both of his brothers have no choice other than to imprison him in the Underworld, where he remained until freed by Miranjo to conquer the Bosse Kingdom.
His name is an anagram of the Japanese word "Ken-ō" (means "Sword King").
Despa (デスパー, Desupā)
Voiced by: Takahiro Sakurai (Japanese); Christopher R. Sabat (English)
The middle brother of the king of the Underworld and Ōken. Unlike his older brother, Despa is much weaker, vainer and money-minded. He takes Bojji and Kage into his care and promises to train Bojji up to become stronger (for a price).
Devil
An unknown creature that came out of Bosse's mouth after the king's death. He is known to grant wishes at a certain price and does so at the detriment of others. Originally a kind, childlike entity who befriended Miranjo, he became a monstrous, sadistic and nearly immortal creature. It is said from an old prophecy that Bojji is fated to kill the Devil, but given the presence of others, it is not known if this devil is the devil that was mentioned.

== Media ==
=== Manga ===
Ranking of Kings is written and illustrated by Sōsuke Tōka. It has been serialized online via Echoes' user-submitted Manga Hack website since May 20, 2017, and has been collected in 23 tankōbon volumes by Enterbrain as of October 9, 2026. In April 2023, it was announced that the manga would enter an hiatus. Publication resumed in December 2024.

The series is published in English digitally by BookLive on BookWalker. In November 2023 BookLive released apologies from themselves and their translator, Dragon Digital Japan, for the use of "translations plagiarized from pirated copies in the English version of Ranking of Kings volumes 1 through 7".

| No. | Release date | ISBN |
|---|---|---|
| 1 | February 12, 2019 | 978-4-04-735517-0 |
| 2 | February 12, 2019 | 978-4-04-735518-7 |
| 3 | April 12, 2019 | 978-4-04-735599-6 |
| 4 | June 12, 2019 | 978-4-04-735684-9 |
| 5 | August 10, 2019 | 978-4-04-735719-8 |
| 6 | December 12, 2019 | 978-4-04-735807-2 |
| 7 | April 11, 2020 | 978-4-04-735854-6 |
| 8 | August 12, 2020 | 978-4-04-736228-4 |
| 9 | December 11, 2020 | 978-4-04-736458-5 |
| 10 | April 12, 2021 | 978-4-04-736602-2 |
| 11 | August 12, 2021 | 978-4-04-736743-2 |
| 12 | December 10, 2021 | 978-4-04-736868-2 |
| 13 | April 12, 2022 | 978-4-04-737007-4 |
| 14 | August 12, 2022 | 978-4-04-737154-5 |
| 15 | December 12, 2022 | 978-4-04-737284-9 |
| 16 | April 12, 2023 | 978-4-04-737446-1 |
| 17 | August 12, 2023 | 978-4-04-737598-7 |
| 18 | December 12, 2023 | 978-4-04-737742-4 |
| 19 | June 12, 2025 | 978-4-04-738454-5 |
| 20 | October 10, 2025 | 978-4-04-738616-7 |
| 21 | February 12, 2026 | 978-4-04-738795-9 |
| 22 | June 12, 2026 | 978-4-04-500103-1 |
| 23 | October 9, 2026 | 978-4-04-500282-3 |

=== Anime ===
The anime television series adaptation was produced by Wit Studio and aired from October 15, 2021, to March 25, 2022, on Fuji TV's Noitamina block. (Note: Fuji TV listed the series premiere at 24:55 on October 14, 2021, which is effectively 12:55 a.m. JST on October 15.) The series was directed by Yōsuke Hatta, with Taku Kishimoto supervising the series' scripts, Atsuko Nozaki designing the characters, and MAYUKO composing the series' music. For cour 1, King Gnu performed the opening theme "Boy", while Yama performed the ending theme "Oz". For the second cour, Vaundy performed the opening theme "Hadaka no Yūsha" ("Naked Hero"), while Milet performed the ending theme "Flare". Funimation streamed the series outside of Asia. Medialink licensed the series in Southeast Asia and streamed it on iQIYI and Netflix. The Tokyo Federation for the Deaf supervises the sign language depicted in the show. Funimation announced an English dub version of the show.

In August 2022, a spin-off series, titled Ranking of Kings: The Treasure Chest of Courage (王様ランキング 勇気の宝箱, Ōsama Ranking: Yūki no Takarabako), was announced. The cast and staff from the anime series returned for the series. It aired from April 14 to June 16, 2023, on Fuji TV's Noitamina block. (Note: Fuji TV listed the series premiere at 24:55 on April 13, 2023, which is effectively 12:55 a.m. JST on April 14.) People 1 performed the opening theme "Gold", while Aimer performed the ending theme "Atemonaku" ("Aimlessly"). Crunchyroll streamed the series.

==== Episodes ====
===== Main series (2021–22) =====
| No. | Title | Directed by | Written by | Storyboarded by | Original release date |
|---|---|---|---|---|---|
| 1 | "The Prince's New Clothes"; Transliteration: "Hadaka no Ōji" (Japanese: 裸の王子) | Yōsuke Hatta | Taku Kishimoto | Yōsuke Hatta | October 15, 2021 (Note: This episode aired at 1:28 a.m. JST, 33 minutes after the original air time on Fuji TV.) |
| 2 | "The Prince and Kage"; Transliteration: "Ōji to Kage" (Japanese: 王子とカゲ) | Makoto Fuchigami | Taku Kishimoto | Yōsuke Hatta | October 22, 2021 |
| 3 | "The New King"; Transliteration: "Atarashii Kokuō" (Japanese: 新しい国王) | Kazuaki Imai | Taku Kishimoto | Kazuaki Imai | October 29, 2021 (Note: This episode aired at 1:05 a.m. JST, 10 minutes after the original air time on Fuji TV.) |
| 4 | "His First Journey"; Transliteration: "Hajimete no Tabi" (Japanese: 初めての旅) | Makoto Fuchigami | Taku Kishimoto | Makoto Fuchigami | November 5, 2021 |
| 5 | "Intertwining Plots"; Transliteration: "Karamiau Inbō" (Japanese: からみあう陰謀) | Masahiro Okamura | Taku Kishimoto | Shinobu Tagashira | November 12, 2021 |
| 6 | "The King of the Underworld"; Transliteration: "Meifu no Ō" (Japanese: 冥府の王) | Hitomi Ezoe | Taku Kishimoto | Shintarō Nakazawa | November 19, 2021 |
| 7 | "The Prince's Apprenticeship"; Transliteration: "Ōji no Deshiiri" (Japanese: 王子の弟子入り) | Shōta Goshozono | Taku Kishimoto | Shōta Goshozono | November 26, 2021 (Note: This episode aired at 1:30 a.m. JST, 35 minutes after the original air time on Fuji TV.) |
| 8 | "The Sacrifice of Dreams"; Transliteration: "Yume no Ikenie" (Japanese: 夢のいけにえ) | Yumi Kamakura | Taku Kishimoto | Makoto Fuchigami | December 3, 2021 |
| 9 | "The Queen and the Shield"; Transliteration: "Ōhi to Tate" (Japanese: 王妃と盾) | Arifumi Imai | Taku Kishimoto | Arifumi Imai | December 10, 2021 |
| 10 | "The Prince's Sword"; Transliteration: "Ōji no Ken" (Japanese: 王子の剣) | Mai Teshima | Taku Kishimoto | Mai Teshima | December 17, 2021 |
| 11 | "Older and Younger Brothers"; Transliteration: "Ani to Otōto" (Japanese: 兄と弟) | Ryōta Aikei | Taku Kishimoto | Ryōta Aikei | December 24, 2021 (Note: This episode aired at 1:15 a.m. JST, 20 minutes after the original air time on Fuji TV.) |
| 12 | "The Footsteps of War"; Transliteration: "Tatakai no Ashioto" (Japanese: 戦いの足音) | Makoto Fuchigami | Taku Kishimoto | Shinsaku Sasaki | January 7, 2022 |
| 13 | "The Kingdom in Turmoil"; Transliteration: "Ōkoku no Midare" (Japanese: 王国の乱れ) | Chihiro Kumano & Atsushi Nakagawa | Taku Kishimoto | Masayuki Miyaji | January 14, 2022 |
| 14 | "The Return of the Prince"; Transliteration: "Ōji no Kikan" (Japanese: 王子の帰還) | Yumi Kamakura | Taku Kishimoto | Yumi Kamakura | January 21, 2022 |
| 15 | "The Order of the Underworld"; Transliteration: "Meifu Kishidan" (Japanese: 冥府騎士団) | Hitomi Ezoe | Tomomi Kawaguchi | Shinsaku Sasaki | January 28, 2022 |
| 16 | "Royal Majesty"; Transliteration: "Ō no Igen" (Japanese: 王の威厳) | Mai Teshima | Tomomi Kawaguchi | Yoshiki Kitai, Yōko Kanemori & Mai Teshima | February 4, 2022 (Note: This episode aired at 1:00 a.m. JST, 5 minutes after the original air time on Fuji TV.) |
| 17 | "The Curse of Immortality"; Transliteration: "Fushi no Noroi" (Japanese: 不死の呪い) | Tomoko Hiramuki, Mitsutoshi Satō & Atsushi Nakagawa | Fūka Ishii | Hiroaki Shimura | February 11, 2022 |
| 18 | "Battle with the Gods"; Transliteration: "Kamigami to no Arasoi" (Japanese: 神々との争い) | Makoto Fuchigami, Mitsutoshi Satō & Hitomi Ezoe | Fūka Ishii | Shintarō Nakazawa | February 18, 2022 |
| 19 | "The Last Bastion"; Transliteration: "Saigo no Toride" (Japanese: 最後の砦) | Arifumi Imai | Taku Kishimoto | Atsushi Takahashi | February 25, 2022 |
| 20 | "Immortal vs. Invincible"; Transliteration: ""Fujimi" tai "Muteki"" (Japanese: "不死身" 対 "無敵") | Yumi Kamakura | Taku Kishimoto | Yumi Kamakura | March 4, 2022 |
| 21 | "The Swordsmanship of a King"; Transliteration: "Ō no Ken" (Japanese: 王の剣) | Shōta Goshozono | Taku Kishimoto | Shōta Goshozono | March 11, 2022 |
| 22 | "A Promise to the Demon"; Transliteration: "Majin to no Yakusoku" (Japanese: 魔神との約束) | Hitomi Ezoe | Taku Kishimoto | Yoshiki Kitai | March 18, 2022 |
| 23 | "The King and the Sun"; Transliteration: "Ōsama to Taiyō" (Japanese: 王様と太陽) | Se Jun Kim & Yōsuke Hatta | Taku Kishimoto | Se Jun Kim & Yōsuke Hatta | March 25, 2022 (Note: This episode aired at 1:25 a.m. JST, 30 minutes after the original air time on Fuji TV.) |

===== The Treasure Chest of Courage (2023) =====
| No. | Title | Directed by | Written by | Storyboarded by | Original release date |
|---|---|---|---|---|---|
| 1 | "Kage's Errand"; Transliteration: "Kage no Ōtsukai" (Japanese: カゲのおつかい) | Makoto Fuchigami | Tomomi Kawaguchi | Makoto Fuchigami | April 14, 2023 (Note: This episode aired at 1:10 a.m. JST, 15 minutes after the original air time on Fuji TV.) |
| 1 | "The Prince and Money"; Transliteration: "Ōji to Okane" (Japanese: 王子とお金) | Makoto Fuchigami | Tomomi Kawaguchi | Makoto Fuchigami | April 14, 2023 |
| 2 | "Beasts of the Wilderness"; Transliteration: "Arano no Shishi" (Japanese: 荒野の獣) | Yoshitane Hosogawa | Fūka Ishii | Atsushi Takahashi | April 21, 2023 |
| 2 | "A Mysterious Desert"; Transliteration: "Fushigina Sabaku" (Japanese: ふしぎな砂漠) | Tomoko Hiramuki | Fūka Ishii | Atsushi Takahashi | April 21, 2023 |
| 3 | "Hiling's Old Friend"; Transliteration: "Hiringu no Kyūyū" (Japanese: ヒリングの旧友) | Makoto Fuchigami | Tomomi Kawaguchi | Shinsaku Sasaki | April 28, 2023 |
| 3 | "Daida and Magic"; Transliteration: "Daida to Mahō" (Japanese: ダイダと魔法) | Atsuko Nozaki | Tomomi Kawaguchi | Atsuko Nozaki | April 28, 2023 |
| 4 | "Immortality and the Three Brothers"; Transliteration: "Fushi to Sankyōdai" (Japanese: 不死と三兄弟) | Yōsuke Hatta | Fūka Ishii | Yōsuke Hatta | May 5, 2023 |
| 5 | "The Laws of the Underworld"; Transliteration: "Meifu no Okite" (Japanese: 冥府の掟) | Tagashira Shinobu | Fūka Ishii | Tagashira Shinobu | May 12, 2023 (Note: This episode aired at 1:55 a.m. JST, 1 hour after the original air time on Fuji TV.) |
| 5 | "A White Horse in Love"; Transliteration: "Koisuru Hakuba" (Japanese: 恋する白馬) | Tagashira Shinobu | Fūka Ishii | Tagashira Shinobu | May 12, 2023 |
| 5 | "The Gentle Soldier, Hokuro"; Transliteration: "Yasashiki Heishi Hokuro" (Japanese: 優しき兵士ホクロ) | Tagashira Shinobu | Fūka Ishii | Tagashira Shinobu | May 12, 2023 |
| 6 | "Bojji the King"; Transliteration: "Oni natta Bojji" (Japanese: 王になったボッジ) | Yoshiyuki Kaneko | Tomomi Kawaguchi | Yoshiyuki Kaneko | May 19, 2023 |
| 6 | "The Melancholy of King Daida"; Transliteration: "Daida O no Yūutsu" (Japanese: ダイダ王の憂鬱) | Yoshiyuki Kaneko | Tomomi Kawaguchi | Yoshiyuki Kaneko | May 19, 2023 |
| 7 | "The Snake Charmer with the Crooked Smile"; Transliteration: "Susukira Warai no Hebizukai" (Japanese: 薄ら笑いの蛇使い) | Yoshimichi Kameda | Tomomi Kawaguchi | Atsushi Takahashi | May 26, 2023 |
| 7 | "The Big Four's Banquet"; Transliteration: "Shitennō no Utage" (Japanese: 四天王の宴) | Yoshimichi Kameda | Tomomi Kawaguchi | Yoshimichi Kameda | May 26, 2023 |
| 8 | "Kage's Yearning"; Transliteration: "Kage no Akogare" (Japanese: カゲのあこがれ) | Makoto Fuchigami & Yoshitane Hosogawa | Fūka Ishii | Hikaru Saito | June 2, 2023 |
| 8 | "A Great Mother"; Transliteration: "Idaina Haha" (Japanese: 偉大な母) | Kaga Ryouya | Fūka Ishii | Kaga Ryouya | June 2, 2023 |
| 9 | "Miranjo and the Demon"; Transliteration: "Miranjo to Majin" (Japanese: ミランジョと魔神) | Akino Fukuji | Fūka Ishii | Akino Fukuji | June 9, 2023 |
| 9 | "The Prince and His Treasures"; Transliteration: "Oji to Hōmotsu" (Japanese: 王子と宝物) | Makoto Fuchigami & Yoshitane Hosogawa | Fūka Ishii | Makoto Fuchigami | June 9, 2023 |
| 10 | "Return of the Sword King"; Transliteration: "Kenō no Fukkatsu" (Japanese: 剣王の復活) | Yōsuke Hatta | Taku Kishimoto | Yōsuke Hatta | June 16, 2023 |

==== Film ====
An anime film adaptation was announced on June 22, 2023.

== Reception ==
=== Manga ===
By December 2021, the manga had over 1.5 million copies in circulation.

Ranking of Kings ranked sixth place on the Tsutaya Comic Awards 2019. It ranked fifth on Manga Shimbun Taishō 2019. The 2020 edition of Takarajimasha's Kono Manga ga Sugoi!, which surveys professionals in the manga and publishing industry, named Ranking of Kings the seventh best manga series for male readers. The characters Bojji and Kage were nominated in the Best lead male actor and Best supporting male actor respectively, in the Magademy Award 2022. Ranking of Kings was nominated in the Youth Selections category at the 50th Angoulême International Comics Festival in 2023.

=== Anime ===
In China, the anime received acclaim from viewers for its heartwarming story. The show received nearly 48 million views on Bilibili with only 4 episodes available.

==== Awards and nominations ====
| Year | Award | Category | Nominee | Result | Ref. |
|---|---|---|---|---|---|
| 2022 | 6th Crunchyroll Anime Awards | Anime of the Year | Ranking of Kings | Nominated | |
| 2022 | 6th Crunchyroll Anime Awards | Best Protagonist | Bojji | Nominated | |
| 2022 | 6th Crunchyroll Anime Awards | Best Boy | Bojji | Won | |
| 2022 | 6th Crunchyroll Anime Awards | Best Fantasy | Ranking of Kings | Nominated | |
| 2022 | 6th Crunchyroll Anime Awards | Best Character Design | Ranking of Kings | Nominated | |
| 2022 | 6th Crunchyroll Anime Awards | Best VA Performance (French) | Alexis Tomassian as Kage | Nominated | |
| 2022 | Galaxy Awards | Monthly Galaxy Awards | Ranking of Kings | Won | |
| 2022 | 12th Newtype Anime Awards | Best Mascot Character | Kage | 4th place | |
| 2022 | IGN Awards | Best Anime Series | Ranking of Kings | Nominated | |
| 2022 | 28th Manga Barcelona Awards | Best Anime Series Premiere | Ranking of Kings | Nominated | |
| 2023 | 7th Crunchyroll Anime Awards | Anime of the Year | Ranking of Kings | Nominated | |
| 2023 | 7th Crunchyroll Anime Awards | Best Main Character | Bojji | Nominated | |
| 2023 | 7th Crunchyroll Anime Awards | Best Supporting Character | Kage | Nominated | |
| 2023 | 7th Crunchyroll Anime Awards | "Must Protect at All Costs" Character | Bojji | Nominated | |
| 2023 | 7th Crunchyroll Anime Awards | "Must Protect at All Costs" Character | Kage | Nominated | |
| 2023 | 7th Crunchyroll Anime Awards | Best Animation | Ranking of Kings | Nominated | |
| 2023 | 7th Crunchyroll Anime Awards | Best Director | Yōsuke Hatta | Nominated | |
| 2023 | 7th Crunchyroll Anime Awards | Best Character Design | Atsuko Nozaki | Nominated | |
| 2023 | 7th Crunchyroll Anime Awards | Best Fantasy | Ranking of Kings | Nominated | |
| 2023 | 7th Crunchyroll Anime Awards | Best Opening Sequence | "Hadaka no Yūsha" by Vaundy | Nominated | |
| 2023 | 7th Crunchyroll Anime Awards | Best VA Performance (English) | SungWon Cho as Kage | Nominated | |
| 2023 | 7th Crunchyroll Anime Awards | Best VA Performance (Arabic) | Adel Abo Hassoon as Kage | Nominated | |
| 2023 | 7th Crunchyroll Anime Awards | Best VA Performance (Castilian) | Marc Gómez as Daida | Nominated | |
| 2023 | 7th Crunchyroll Anime Awards | Best VA Performance (Castilian) | Mónica Padrós as Hiling | Nominated | |
| 2023 | 7th Crunchyroll Anime Awards | Best VA Performance (French) | Alexis Tomassian as Kage | Nominated | |
| 2023 | 7th Crunchyroll Anime Awards | Best VA Performance (French) | Brigitte Lecordier as Bojji | Won | |
| 2023 | 7th Crunchyroll Anime Awards | Best VA Performance (Italian) | Andrea Oldani as Daida | Nominated | |
| 2024 | 8th Crunchyroll Anime Awards | "Must Protect at All Costs" Character | Bojji | Nominated | |
| 2024 | 8th Crunchyroll Anime Awards | Best Fantasy | Ranking of Kings: The Treasure Chest of Courage | Nominated | |
