= List of Tower of God characters =

This article covers the characters of a South Korean webtoon Tower of God (Korean: 신의 탑; RR: Sin-ui Tap).

== Irregulars ==
Twenty-Fifth Bam/Jyu Viole Grace
Voiced by: Taichi Ichikawa (Japanese); Johnny Yong Bosch (English)
Twenty-Fifth Bam (Korean: 스물다섯번째 밤; RR: Seumul-daseot-beonjjae Bam; literal translation: Twenty-fifth Night) is the protagonist of Tower of God. Bam is the latest Irregular to enter the Tower, but because of his young age and naiveté, his abilities don't resemble those that previous Irregulars are known for. In the story, Bam enters the Tower in search of his best friend Rachel, the only person who visited him and cared for him in the years of isolation that he spent in a cave underneath the Tower. After entering the Tower, he is told that all the answers that he seeks will be answered if he climbs the tower, though he is immediately presented with a seemingly impossible and deadly test. Bam succeeds, and is allowed to move onto the second floor, where all would-be Regulars start their ascension. Throughout the webtoon, Bam makes several friends among the candidates, and together they pass the many tests of the floor.
Bam returns in Tower of God: Part 2 – The Return of the Prince, which takes place six years after the original story, using the alias Jyu Viole Grace (Korean: 쥬 비올레 그레이스; RR: Ju Biole Geureiseu). In this story, Bam is under the control of the infamous anti-Jahad group FUG, forced to cooperate to keep his old teammates safe. But then, not long after, his old teammates, including Khun, found out that he was alive, and was Jyu Viole Grace. They set out a plan to free Bam from FUG, which takes place in the Workshop Battle, and it was successful. After that, Bam and his teammates goes through a series of adventures on the Hell Express.
Bam returns again in Tower of God:Part 3, taking place a few years after the Battle of the Last Stop. Ha Jin Sung, Bam's teacher in FUG, was caught by Kallavan, who is in control of a unit in Jahad's army. To rescue Ha Jin Sung, Bam needs help from the King of the Dogs, Baylord Yama, a FUG slayer, and him and his teammates set out on another adventure in the Cage, where the Dogs live.
Rachel
Voiced by: Saori Hayami (Japanese); Valerie Rose Lohman (English)
Rachel (Korean: 라헬; RR: Rahel) was Bam's best friend until she entered the Tower and became a regular (but that was only what Bam thought which is proved in the later half of the webtoon). She desires to see the stars in the night sky at the top of the Tower and is determined to reach it by all means. This wish comes from her fear of the darkness of the night. Later in the webtoon, she is wounded and pretends to be heavily crippled, at which point Bam declares that he will "be her legs" and help her continue climb the Tower. In a later test, she decides to betray Bam and attempts to kill him. She convinces his friends that Bam died protecting her and profits from the pity of the group that wants to continue the task Bam had started: carrying her to the top of the tower, then after six years Bam finds out Rachel is part of FUG. She then goes with Khun Aguero Agnes and climbs the tower. She and two new teammates in their new team decide to betray the group. They kill one and injure another one from their team then run away. She soon meets Bam again, only to push him away yet again. She meets a woman named Yura Ha on the train and they quickly become friends. She promises to show Yura the stars in return for helping her. She decides to help a former FUG slayer named 'White' to use him for her own purposes.
Phantaminum
The strongest and most dangerous being of the entire Tower. He is a highly enigmatic person, ranked first in the Tower. One day, Phantaminum breached Jahad's highly fortified citadel and single-handedly massacred most of its inhabitants, all of them High Rankers. Phantaminum vanished and since then hasn't reappeared. Most survivors of Phantaminum's rampage were deranged with fear. Since then he was regarded as the mightiest being of the Tower, capable of destroying it should he wish it. According to SIU, Phantaminum is an Axis user, a being who can warp reality around themselves, and his power far surpasses that of Enryu.
Enryu
Enryu is a mysterious Irregular and currently the second in rank. He is the first Irregular to enter the Tower during the reign of Jahad. His nickname is Red Tower because Shinsoo turns bright red in his presence. Enryu is a tall and handsome young man with red hair and eyes. His abilities are greater than the Floor Guardians and are considered heretical, breaking the laws of the Tower. He is rumored to be capable of creating life from Shinsoo and control at least 9000 baangs of Shinsoo, the greatest number recorded in the history of the Tower. Enryu is extremely powerful, capable of ravaging an entire floor and slaying its Guardian. His famous ability Red Rain can shroud the sky with an untold number of powerful spears made of red Shinsoo and strike them down on his opponents.
One day, Enryu suddenly appeared at the 43rd floor, and warned its inhabitants that he will kill anyone who believed in the fake king Jahad. He then proceeded to slaughter Jahad's fanatics. The Floor Guardian of the 43rd floor was furious and fought him, but even he was no match for Enryu and was killed. Enryu is the only one in the tower who was able to kill an administrator, a feat impossible even for Jahad. Enryu disappeared and since then his location is unknown. He left behind a huge red fragment, called the Thorn. It is rumoured that the Thorn is the weapon destined to kill Jahad. It is speculated that Enryu has a connection with Arlene Grace, the object of Jahad's affections, wife of V and the mother of 25th Bam.
Urek Mazino
Voiced by: Hiroki Takahashi (Japanese); Alejandro Saab (English)
A ruthless irregular currently the fourth in rank. As the strongest currently active Ranker, as an irregular, and as one of the founders of the Wolhaiksong, Urek Mazino is one of the most influential people inside the tower. His nickname is Ray Barracuda. Ray refers to his combat style, in which he fires Shinsu at the speed of light. Barracuda is the name of the most aggressive fish in the tower.
Urek is a tall and muscular young man with short blonde hair under a white baseball cap, and fiery red eyes. On his back, a tattoo of a tree with 7 pairs of wings (the symbol of Wolhaiksong). He is a respected by every men. However, he is disliked by every woman he meets. Ha-Yuri-Jahad said: "He is the best man to fight with, but the worse man to live with." The most famous quote of Urek is: "What fun would it be to become the king of the tower? Tell Jahad to keep his boring seat. I will get out of the Tower. Outside the Tower, there exists a vast world, rolling skies stretch endlessly, and countless stars illuminate the darkness. A place that is a thousand times—no, a billion times wider and freer than the tower. Once you imagine that such a world exists, don't you think all those things you want are all so trivial?"
Although his main position is fisherman, he excels in every other position better than almost all of the rankers. He beats everyone in agility, strength, Shinsu control, etc. After entering the tower, he passed all of the tests faster than any other ranker.

== Regulars ==
Khun Aguero Agnes
Voiced by: Nobuhiko Okamoto (Japanese); Chris Hackney (English)
Khun Agnes (Korean: 쿤 아게로 아그니스; RR: Khun Ahgehro Ageunis) is from one of the 10 Great families that first climbed the tower, and the direct son of High Ranker Khun Eduan. He meets Bam in the first test of the second floor, and deems him interesting enough to accompany and aids him while they climb the tower. He and Rak quickly become Bam's closest friends. He is usually in the Lightbearer position, but he has been shown to be capable of basic close combat as well when the situation calls for it. His name is a reference to the Argentine former footballer Sergio "Kun" Agüero.
Rak Wraithraiser
Voiced by: Kenta Miyake (Japanese); Matthew David Rudd (English)
Rak Wraithraiser (Korean: 라크 레크레이셔; RR: Rakeu Rekeureisyeo) is a large, powerful, and very confident spear bearer. He unwillingly teamed up with Twenty-Fifth Bam and Khun Aguero Agnis early in the story, and he quickly became attached to them during the following tests. Due to his reptile-like features, he is sometimes referred to as "Alligator" or "Gator" and even "Crocodile". Rak refers to his friends and people he meets as "turtles" of different colours and features (ex: black turtle, blue turtle, crazy turtle); the term by which he also earnestly addresses his "prey". Rak is able to change his size so that he is smaller and convenient to walk around because he is a Compression Lisensor which gives him the ability to shrink his size at will so he can move around the Tower more easily. On the hidden floor in an encounter with the data of Khun Eduan (the head of the Khun family) Rak learns that he has the power to control rocks/stone and might be a part of/a descendant of a native species in the tower until the king of the tower hunted them all down and killed them.
Ja Wangnan
Voiced by: Yuma Uchida (Japanese); Aleks Le (English)
Ja Wangnan (Korean: 자 왕난; RR: Ja Wangnan) is another primary protagonist introduced at the beginning of part II, which initially focuses on him before spreading attention to the other main cast again. On the 20th floor Wagnan is initially selfish and willing to resort to trickery to pass the test to the 21st Floor, as he has been stuck on the 20th floor failing the same floor advancement test repeatedly ever since arriving on the 20th floor which results in him falling into financial debt with loan sharks; but later in his last chance test he starts to display his inner caring side and is shown to be sympathetic and forgiving to people who similarly used trickery against others to survive. His goal is to become the King of the Tower. He is blond haired, has red protrusions on the back of his head, and has a red ring with the symbol of Zahard (also known as Jahad in other translations) inscribed on it, a ring that Karaka, a FUG slayer wears. He has not displayed any special abilities with shinsu or martial arts, but was able to survive a fatal pierce through his heart in the Workshop battle when Beta tried to stop him from summoning Baam later showing a full recovery, which garnered suspicion and interest from the few people who took notice of this. He is also referred to as Prince of the Red Light district. Wangnan wishes his horns would grow. "Wangnan Jah" read backwards in Korean means "I am the prince."
White
White was the 10th of eleven slayers in FUG. He belongs in the Arie family, one of the '10 great families'. His body has been lost, and only his name and souls remain. He is good at using swords, and has white hair, just like all the other members of the Arie family. His height varies depending on the size of his power. He often competes with Jue Viole Grace, the new slayer candidate of FUG. White has been interested in spells or dangerous magic since ancient times, especially those that needed human sacrifice. Because of that, people in the tower feared him. The cruelest spell he could use was used at a hidden place in the tower. He caused war between two countries, and cheated them so that they would pray for his help. Many people died for him, and he ate the souls of these people, which made him stronger. This spell supposedly killed more than one billion people. Finally, a 'princess of Jahad' suppressed him and he lost almost all of his power. After that, he went into the hell train to regain his lost power. He manipulated people in the train to kill each other. One of the people in the train, Roen, made sacrifices to stop White, and he has been sealed for 600 years.
Actually, White is the aggregate of five sons and daughters of the Arie family. They used a spell to combine their souls and became stronger. The central personality of the five was Hoaqin's. However, the spell needed them to keep eating the souls of others. As a result, White has eaten souls since they used the spell. In the hell train, people who wanted to revive White; FUG, the conductor of the hell train; Pedro, and party of Rachel's, clashed with Jue Viole Grace, and had a life-and-death confrontation. When this match was over, the conductor's plan, to kill the party of Jue Viole Grace, was thwarted by Ha-Yuri Jahad. She suppressed the conductor and the hell train. This made the match unclear. and White was able to escape from the hell train. The five clones of White are;

1. Arie Vicente
2. Arie Anna
3. Arie David
4. Arie Albelda
5. Arie Hoaqin

The last clone of White is made from the souls killed by White and Arie Albelda.
Shibisu
Shibisu (Korean: 십 이수; RR: Ship Lesoo) is a scout and the leader of team Isu.
Voiced by: Takuya Eguchi (Japanese); Scott Whyte (English)
Hatz
Hatz (Korean: 하츠; RR: Ha cheu) a devout swordsman introduced on the 2nd test flooe and teamed up with Anaak and Isu became a scout in team Isu.
Voiced by: Toshinari Fukamachi (Japanese); Nicolas Roye (English)
Phonsekal Lauroe
Laure (Korean: 폰세칼 라우뢰; RR: Ponsehkahl Raurweh) is a wave controller in team Isu who comes from the Eurasia family, one of the Ten Great Families.
Voiced by: Daisuke Ono (Japanese); Nicolas Roye (English)
Serena Rinnen
Voiced by: Hitomi Nabatame (Japanese); Cristina Vee (English)
Deod
Voiced by: Kensuke Shimizu (Japanese); Keith Silverstein (English)
Hoh
Voiced by: Fumiyoshi Shioya (Japanese); Edward Bosco (English)
Yihwa
Voiced by: Sayumi Watabe
Hon Akraptor
Voiced by: Kento Shiraishi (Japanese); Mick Lauer (English)
Yeo Miseng
Voiced by: Saki Miyashita (Japanese); Brenna Larsen (English)
Yeo Goseng
Voiced by: Yū Shimamura (Japanese); Reba Buhr (English)
Kang Horyang
Voiced by: Kenichirou Matsuda (Japanese); Cory Yee (English)
Kim Lurker
Voiced by: Naoki Irie (Japanese); Cory Yee (English)
Nya Nia
Voiced by: Natsuko Abe (Japanese); Anjali Kunapaneni (English)
Prince
Voiced by: Kengo Kawanishi (Japanese); Alejandro Saab (English)
Mule Love
Voiced by: Ayumu Murase (Japanese); Reba Buhr (English)
Edin Dan
Voiced by: Yu Hayashi (Japanese); Ryan Colt Levy (English)
Novick
Voiced by: Jun Kasama (Japanese); Kellen Goff (English)
Khun Ran
Voiced by: Minako Kotobuki (Japanese); A.J. Beckles (English)
Quaetro Blitz
Voiced by: Tetsuya Kakihara (Japanese); Chris Hackney (English)
Beiamino Cassano
Voiced by: Kenjiro Abekawa (Japanese); Landon McDonald (English)
Xia Xia
Voiced by: Konomi Inagaki (Japanese); Ryan Bartley (English)
Traveller
Voiced by: Mizuki Ishii (Japanese); Griffin Burns (English)
Beta
Voiced by: Chiharu Shigematsu (Japanese); Griffin Burns (English)
Chang Blarode
Voiced by: Kentarō Kumagai (Japanese); Ryan Colt Levy (English)
Po Bidau Gustang
Voiced by: Chiaki Kobayashi (Japanese); Kellen Goff (English)
Reflejo
Voiced by: Hidenori Takahashi (Japanese); Landon McDonald (English)
Sophia Amae
Voiced by: Mai Nakahara
Ron Mei
Voiced by: Ai Kayano
Rapdevil
Voiced by: Ryō Sugisaki
Apple
Voiced by: Michiko Kaiden
Madoraco
Voiced by: Takaya Hashi
Khun Hatzling
Voiced by: Koki Uchiyama

== Rankers ==
Lero Ro
Voiced by: Kenjirō Tsuda (Japanese); Trent Mills (English)
Quant Blitz
Voiced by: Hiroyuki Yoshino (Japanese); Xander Mobus (English)
Hansung Yu
Voiced by: Daisuke Kishio (Japanese); Lucien Dodge (English)
Ha Jinsung
Voiced by: Katsuyuki Konishi
Ha Jinsung is the mentor of Bam. He trains Bam when he is trained by the FUG to become Jue Viole Grace (which is Bam itself but a slayer candidate) he is one of the top rankers and a prominent member of FUG. He has experienced very bad things which led him to join FUG. Bam is his favourite student and he cares for him a lot. The ongoing episodes are revolving around Bam trying to save Jinsung Ha which shows that Bam cares deeply for his master.
The Great Warriors
The comrades of King Jahad who are the progenitors of the Ten Great Families of the Tower. Jahad and the Warriors are technically Irregulars, but are not considered as such. Eons ago, these warriors followed Jahad into the Tower, conquered its floors and established a great civilization. All of them (except Hendo Lok Bloodmadder and V) received immortality through a contract with the Guardians. Two members, Arlene Grace and V had their names erased from history for rebelling against Jahad. V committed suicide while Arlene was able to escape the Tower. Arlene and V also happen to be the parents of Bam. In the present era, although the Great Warriors enjoy a great status, they have grown notoriously callous, even to their own families and seldom participate in the Tower's affairs. The Great Warriors, according to their ranks are Arie Hon, Khun Edahn, Ha Yurin, Tu Perie Tperie, Eurasia Blossom, Poe Bidau Gustang, Hendo Lok Bloodmadder, Yeon Hana, Ari Han, and Lo Po Bia Traumerei.

== Guardians ==
Headon
Headon (Korean: 헤돈; RR: Hehdon) is the guardian of Headon's Floor (The First Floor), and the caretaker of the tower. Headon is the only Guardian known to visit other floors, as he teleports to other floors to select people that deem worthy of climbing the tower as chosen ones, regulars.
Voiced by: Hōchū Ōtsuka (Japanese); Christopher Swindle (English)

== Jahad and Jahad Princesses ==
Jahad
Alternatively spelled as Zahard. The great king of the Tower, founder of the Jahad empire and the overarching antagonist of the story. He is an Irregular ranked 3 across the tower. Eons ago, Jahad and his companions, the Great Warriors entered the Tower and conquered its floors. Afterwards, Jahad pioneered a great civilization and became its hegemon. For unknown reasons, Jahad halted his ascent at the 134th floor and sealed the entrance to the mysterious 135th floor, a decision that displeased many people. It even led to a war between Jahad and his love Arlen Grace and former companion V, which Jahad won and subsequently caused the formation of FUG, which would become Jahad Empire's most dangerous enemies, leading to Jahad killing Arlen and V's son, Twenty-Fifth Bam, out of jealousy that his love with Arlen was unreturned. Jahad took the key to the 135th floor and halved it: one half was melted to forge the 13 month series of weapons while the other half was reforged into an untold number of rings. The fragments of the key are all over the tower and Jahad resorted to cruel means to prevent them from being reunited to rebuild the key. It is unknown what caused Jahad to become despotic. Given his contracts with the floor guardians, Jahad is immortal and invulnerable to all residents of the tower. Only an Irregular, someone from outside the Tower, and with sufficient power can slay Jahad.
Jahad had seemingly fallen asleep for millennia, causing the Three Lords and his Princesses to handle the matters of the Empire, until the resurrected Bam entered the Hidden Floor with his friends and managed to defeat the data of Jahad back when he had left the Hidden Floor, subsequently waking Zahard up from his slumber and causing him to enter the Hidden Floor. Initially trying to kill Bam, seeing his data's persistence eventually made him abandon his effort, deciding to allow Bam to leave the Hidden Floor and give him a chance to become more powerful and prove himself worthy. The bracelet said to be the key to defeating him that he left to his data was also stolen by Gustang as the Hidden Floor was destroyed. This caused Jahad to order the destruction of FUG and the entire Po Bidau Family, marking the end of the peace that had been kept for centuries and beginning a new war.
Princesses of Jahad
A select group of powerful and beautiful young ladies who have received the blood of King Jahad, inherited his name and are regarded as his foster daughters. Receiving the blood of Jahad renders the Princesses as the ultimate species of the tower, revered by most of its subjects. Entrance to this group is an arduous and bloody task. Its members are required to swear loyalty to Jahad and are banned from having romantic relations for fear of spreading Jahad's power. This group was created by Jahad on the suggestion of Poe Bidau Gustang to distract the subjects from revolting against the decision to seal the 135th floor. The princesses who have reached all the way to the 134th floor are bestowed with a weapon from the 13 month series, and any princess who collects all 13 weapons will be given the right to marry King Jahad and bear his children (Jahad is so powerful, no regular woman can bear him children). In reality, Jahad sabotaged the competition to ensure that there are no victors, partly because he couldn't forget his love for Arlene Grace. The princesses of Jahad are merely a vicious security system to prevent the 13 weapons from being united to form one half of the key to the 135th floor.
Endorsi Jahad
Voiced by: Rie Suegara (Japanese); Jeannie Tirado (English)
When Endorsi was little, she had no family and wandered around. One day, an elderly couple took her in and took care of her, until a snake came up to Endorsi, telling her she had the potential to be a princess. The snake transformed into a jewel, which she took home. Later that night, the snake killed her adoptive parents, fearing they would get in the way of her becoming a princess. The snake stayed with Endorsi until she became of princess, and it would come back as Endorsi's "sworn enemy" in the Hidden Floor. She was later adopted by a great family, who adopted girls with exceptional talent in hopes of one becoming a princess. Every day at dinner, the girls would sit in order of who did the best that day, with people at the front getting an extravagant meal and girls at the back getting only stale bread. When Endorsi first got there, she was the smallest and weakest, and ate cold bread for months.
One day, she had the luck to beat an older girl, so she got her first meal at the table. At the time, it was the best thing she had ever tasted. So Endorsi wondered how good the food must be at the front of the table. It is then heavily hinted that she killed all the other girls so she would get all the food at the table. Endorsi was then selected to become a princess of Jahad, and began climbing the tower as a regular. She became very popular and famous for being beautiful and savage. At the floor of the test, she met all the friends she would climb the tower with, including Bam, who she soon develops romantic feelings for him.
Anaak Jahad
Voiced by: Akira Sekine (Japanese); Cherami Leigh (English)
Was a princess of Jahad who "walked out of the display case" and had a daughter. She is later killed by a royal assassination, but her daughter escaped. Her daughter would later take her name when she became a regular. Former owner of the Green April.
Ha-Yuri Jahad
Voiced by: Mariko Honda (Japanese); Kira Buckland (English)
Yuri is a High Ranker and Princess from the Ha Family. She is also the owner of Black March and Green April, two of the 13 Month Series Ignition Weapons. She is the first Princess to own two 13 Months at the same time since Garam Zahard, and the only other Princess known to have achieved such. Notably, she is one of the most famous Princesses and therefore highly favoured, with much political influence throughout The Tower. After meeting Bam when he first enters the Tower, she becomes quite taken with him and spends most of the story trying to find him again, even boarding the Hell Train to do so.
Jaina Repellista Jahad
Voiced by: Chiaki Omigawa (Japanese); Brenna Larsen (English)
Khun Maschenny Jahad
Voiced by: Saori Ōnishi (Japanese); Reba Buhr (English)

== Guides ==
Hwa Ryun
Voiced by: Yoko Hikasa (Japanese); Laura Post (English)
Hwa Ryun (Korean: 화련; RR: Hwaryeon) is Viole's Guide and also the Guide for FUG's Rankers notably Ha Jinsung. She is a member of the Red Witch species known for being Guides and currently a member of FUG. Evan Edrok briefly encountered her during the Submerged Fish Test and was shocked by seeing her, although Hwa Ryun and Evan don't actually know each other. She entered the tests on the Second Floor posed as a Regular (a job given to her by FUG) in order to better accomplish her objectives without rising any suspicion. In the crown game, she was teamed up with Yung Changsoo and Goon where she refused to ally with the other teams, instead wiping them all out until she was stopped by Androssi (Sometimes Endorsi). She then got past Androssi and attacked Rachel and as a result she was wounded in the face by Bam who somehow attacked with Shinsoo despite him not having made a contract with the manager. After the game she was assigned the Wave Controller Position.
Viole/Bam went to meet her on the 21st Floor, at a karaoke box which was being extorted for money by a Viole impersonator. Hwa Ryun provoked the Viole impersonator, having fun with the situation. Viole easily took care of them. After the Flower of Zygaena test, Hwa Ryun easily manipulated Yihwa into helping Viole by saying that an elite would attempt to correct her family's wrongs. Wangnan later approached her for guidance, knowing that she was a Guide. He realised that she told him that Viole was an Irregular because he would be able to reconnect Viole to his friends. Hwa Ryun made a remark that implied that his motives could be altruistic or selfish, calling him the "Prince of the Red Light District". She told him that if he wanted to reunite Viole with his friends, they must climb to the 30th Floor and participate in the Workshop Battle.
Before the Workshop Battle, Hwa Ryun traded places with Yuto to become part of FUG's team. When Viole was taken in the Thorn chamber, she guided his friends to summon him and save him from being molten. She helped her side of FUG, by using the other side of FUG's plans against them, so that Viole acquired the Thorn. Unfortunately, Hwa Ryun was taken hostage by Reflejo and used in his fight with Viole. Using the White Heavenly Mirror Koon saved her. After the events of the Workshop Battle, she was seen sitting in a room. She had pre-emptively known that Baam would ask her for her help, which Koon noticed. After Koon agreed to the deal, she offered her help and told them of the Hell Express on the 35th Floor.
SIU wrote that she was the most beautiful woman of the Season 1 Regulars. He further stated that this was a foreshadowing, the importance of which has yet to be revealed. Her name means "inferno wheel" when translated from Korean to English. It could also mean "lotus flower".
Evan Erdoch
Voiced by: Kazuyuki Okitsu (Japanese); Kyle McCarley (English)
Evan (Korean: 에반 에드록; RR: Ehbahn Edeurok) is a high ranker and the Chief Guide for the Jahad family, he is Yuri Ha Jahad's guide. Evan is a Silver Dwarf, a species that is recognized by their short height and silver hair and skin. He taught Khun Aguero Agnes to use the Enna Core and updated his light house for this purpose. Evan is known to keep extraordinary and weird items in his bag, such as the Frog Fisher and Adams Glove.

== Ignition Weapons ==
Black March
Voiced by: Shizuka Itō (Japanese); Laura Post (English)
