= List of The Apothecary Diaries characters =

The light novel series The Apothecary Diaries and its adaptations features an extensive cast of characters created by Hyūganatsu.

== Main characters ==
Maomao (猫猫)
Voiced by: Aoi Yūki (drama CD, anime) (Japanese); Emi Lo (English)
The freckled adopted daughter of an apothecary and doctor named Luomen who lives in the red-light district of the capital city. She was born and raised in the Verdigris House, a renowned brothel. She and her adopted dad also provide their services to a number of other brothels in the capital and its courtesans. After being kidnapped by bandits who sell her contractually as a servant to the Imperial Palace, she is accidentally dragged into palace intrigue. Maomao uses her knowledge of poisons, medicine, plants, and basic chemistry to become an unofficial forensic pathologist, in addition to becoming a lady-in-waiting and food taster for one of the Emperor's concubines. While Jinshi is quickly intrigued by her, she initially resents his ways of involving her in palace issues. Instead she prefers to spend time testing out different poisons and medicines, sometimes on herself. Even so, she often helps him solve whatever mystery he brings to her attention because of her insatiable curiosity and because of her position. It is later revealed that her biological father is Lakan, the Minister for Military Affairs of the kingdom, and her mother an ex-courtesan who was retired from courting due to being stricken with incurable syphilis.
Jinshi (壬氏)
Voiced by: Takahiro Sakurai (drama CD), Takeo Ōtsuka (anime), Megumi Han (young) (Japanese); Kaiji Tang, Mikaela Krantz (young) (English)
In the public eye, Jinshi is a eunuch who runs most of the administration of the rear palace, where the Emperor's concubines and their respective staff reside. However, his identity as a eunuch is a carefully maintained deception to protect his true identity. Among high-ranking government officials, including Jinshi himself, he is believed to be the younger brother of the current Emperor. In reality, a second, even more closely guarded secret, known only to a select few, including the Emperor himself, Jinshi is actually the Emperor's firstborn son. Jinshi uses suppressants (anaphrodisiacs) to maintain the appearance of being a eunuch, further concealing his true parentage. Behind his face lies a shrewd mind that tries to balance his duties to the Emperor while improving life within the Imperial Palace. Both men and women alike are attracted to his physical appearance, but he finds himself attracted to Maomao, the only person he has met who finds him disgusting and creepy. His attempts at seducing Maomao to win her heart always fail, but nevertheless, they remain close.

== Imperial Palace ==
=== The Emperor and his Concubines ===
The Emperor
Voiced by: Daichi Endo (Japanese); Alex Mai (English)
The Emperor is a kind-hearted and reasonable man in his thirties, who seeks to erase the ill reputation the previous Emperor, his father, made.
Gyokuyō (玉葉)
Voiced by: Yoko Hikasa (drama CD), Atsumi Tanezaki (anime) (Japanese); Molly Zhang (English)
Known as the Precious Consort, she is one of the Emperor's four high-ranking concubines and is the emperor's favorite. She has bright red hair and brilliant jade green eyes and is the mother of an infant daughter and, later, a son. She took Maomao as a Lady-in-waiting as thanks for warning her about the poisoned makeup. She is also one who supports Jinshi and Maomao. She resides in the Jade Pavilion in the Rear Palace.
Lihua (梨花, Rifa)
Voiced by: Yui Ishikawa (Japanese); Trina Nishimura (English)
Known as the Wise Consort, she is one of the Emperor's four high-ranking concubines. She has dark blue hair and gave birth to his heir. However, when her head lady-in-waiting disregarded Maomao's warning about her poisoned makeup, her infant son died and she herself nearly died. After Maomao later nursed her back to health, she became more friendly to her. She later gave birth to a healthy son. She resides in the Crystal Pavilion in the Rear Palace.;

Lishu (里樹, Rīshu)
Voiced by: Hina Kino (Japanese); Reshel Mae (English)
Known as the Virtuous Consort, she is the youngest of the Emperor's four high-ranking concubines. Due to political reasons, she becomes the mother-in-law of the older Pure Consort. She has food allergies but her ladies-in-waiting think she is just picky with her food, making it one of the reasons to subtly bully her (along with the fact that she is the consort of two emperors) until Maomao suggests death from food allergies is as bad as poisoning and could lead to the execution of those responsible. Lishu was formerly the concubine for the previous Emperor, leaving her concubine duties after the death of the previous Emperor. She briefly worked in a nunnery, during which her father again tried to marry her off to an older high-ranking government official who had a similar predatory interest in young girls like the previous Emperor. However, Ah-Duo and the current Emperor intervened to rescue her from the marriage, bringing her to her former position as a high-ranking Concubine. She resides in the Diamond Pavilion in the Rear Palace.
Ah-Duo (阿多, Ā Duo)
Voiced by: Yūko Kaida (Japanese); Monica Rial (English)
Known as the Pure Consort, she is the eldest of the Emperor's four high-ranking consorts. She shares a close, motherly bond with Lishu and bears a striking androgynous resemblance to Jinshi, heavily implying she is his biological mother. Ah-Duo is the milk sibling of the current Emperor, having shared the same wet nurse. After a difficult childbirth, she secretly exchanged her newborn son, Jinshi, with his newborn uncle to secure Jinshi's better treatment. Jinshi remains unaware of their relationship. Ah-Duo eventually departs the Rear Palace for a southern detached palace. Despite this, she continues to serve the Empire as an advisor/magistrate while hiding her identity.
Loulan (楼蘭, Rouran) / Shisui (子翠)
Voiced by: Asami Seto (Japanese); Suzie Yeung (English)
Ah-Duo's replacement as the Pure Consort. Behavior-wise, she is aloof and seems not to care, and has the most number of ladies-in-waiting, seemingly overshadowing the emperor's favorite concubine. She masquerades as a girl dressed in servant's clothing and has a fascination for insects.

=== Imperial Court members ===
Gaoshun (高順)
Voiced by: Kenjiro Tsuda (drama CD), Katsuyuki Konishi (anime) (Japanese); Alex Hom (English)
Jinshi's loyal attendant, often supporting him and Maomao more quietly.
Guen (虞淵)
Voiced by: Mitsuru Ogata (drama CD), Mitsuaki Kanuka (anime) (Japanese); Jim Foronda (English)
Guen is the palace's doctor, whom Maomao refers to as a quack. Though he was a bit hesitant around Maomao, he comes to accept and befriend her later. His family is a purveyor of high-quality paper to the palace.
Jiaojiao (嬌嬌)
Voiced by: Mari Hino (drama CD)
Lihaku (李白, Rihaku)
Voiced by: Kenji Akabane (Japanese); Seth Fuentes (English)
A soldier who happened to give Maomao a hairpin during the garden party. She requested him to escort her outside the palace walls in exchange for time at the Verdigris, which caused a misunderstanding on Jinshi's part.
Xiaolan (小蘭, Shaoran)
Voiced by: Misaki Kuno (Japanese); Bree Han (English)
A servant at the rear palace who is Maomao's close friend. Whenever she and Maomao come together, she sometimes shares the latest gossip and intel from all over the palace.
Hongniang (紅娘, Hon'nyan)
Voiced by: Megumi Toyoguchi (Japanese); Giovannie Cruz (English)
Hongniang is the dutiful head lady-in-waiting in the Jade Pavilion. Overall she is a good boss to Maomao.
Yinghua (桜花, Infa)
Voiced by: Rie Hikisaka (Japanese); Kelsey Cruz (English)
Yinghua is a young and cheerful lady-in-waiting in the Jade Pavilion, who quickly befriends Maomao. Being fiercely loyal, she often gets embroiled in proxy wars with the ladies-in-waiting of other concubines.
Basen (馬閃)
Voiced by: Tatsumaru Tachibana (Japanese); Edward Michael Escamilla (English)
Basen is Gaoshun's straight-laced second son and one of Jinshi's most reliable attendants.
Kanan (河南)
Voiced by: Umeka Shōji (Japanese); Kat Lozano (English)
Kanan is Lishu's former food taster, her newly promoted head lady-in-waiting, and her only ally in the Diamond Pavilion.
Fengming (風明, Fonmin)
Voiced by: Noriko Hidaka (Japanese); Sally Vahle (English)
Ah-Duo's lead lady-in-waiting whose family owns an apiary. Despite her showing as an exemplary and respected lady-in-waiting, there is a secret behind her. Lishu fears even the mention of her name.
Suiren (水蓮)
Voiced by: Mika Doi; Yūko Kaida (young) (Japanese); Kenneisha Thompson (English)
Suiren is Jinshi's diligent chief lady-in-waiting, and previously Empress Anshi's most trusted lady-in-waiting. She is Ah-Duo's mother.
Lakan (羅漢, Rakan)
Voiced by: Takuya Kirimoto (Japanese); Ricco Fajardo (English)
Lakan is the face-blind, monocle-wearing tactician of the emperor's army and the head of the La clan, to which Maomao belongs, as he is her biological father. He is Luomen's nephew.
Suirei (翠苓)
Voiced by: Kaori Nazuka (Japanese); Veronica Laux (English)
Suirei is a former court lady in the outer court. She is Loulan's half-sister and the first daughter of Shishou. She once used her knowledge of medicinal plants to fake her death and escape.
Rikuson (陸孫)
Voiced by: Koki Uchiyama (Japanese); Charles Nguyen (English)
A subordinate of Lakan who is sent to become Gyokuyou's aide.
Shin (杏)
Voiced by: Sayaka Kinoshita (Japanese); Morgan Lauré Garrett (English)
Shin is the head lady-in-waiting of the Crystal Pavilion and Lihua's jealous cousin. She discarded Maomao's warning to Lihua about the poisoned face powder, causing Lihua's son's death and Lihua's near-death.
Shenlu (深緑, Shenryu)
Voiced by: Masako Katsuki (Japanese); Leslie Marie Collins (English)
Shenlu is an older maid who works in the Rear Palace Clinic and possesses limited medical knowledge. She is one of a few who knows of Maomao's ability to make medicine.
Taihou (大宝, Taihō)
Voiced by: Aya Hisakawa (Japanese); Anastasia Muñoz (English)
Taihou was a lady-in-waiting of the concubine Shenmei during the time of the previous Emperor, who assaulted her, which led to her illegitimate daughter, and eventually her granddaughter Suirei.
Anshi (安氏)
Voiced by: Mamiko Noto (Japanese); Cassie Ewulu (English)
The empress dowager and a victim of the previous emperor's tendencies. She gave birth to the current emperor.
Haku-u (白羽), Koku-u (黒羽) and Seki-u (赤羽)
Voiced by: Satomi Satō (Japanese); Kara Edwards (English) (Hakū)
Voiced by: Hitomi Ueda (Japanese); Natalie Haruka Ewe (English) (Kokū)
Voiced by: Miku Itō (Japanese); Lily Gast (English) (Sekiu)
Haku-u, Koku-u, and Seki-u are Gyokuyou's latest addition to her staff of ladies-in-waiting, who are also sisters. They are from the same hometown as Gyokuyou. Haku-u is the eldest, while Seki-u is the youngest. Maomao often cannot tell them apart due to their very similar appearances, so they wear differently colored headbands.
Lahan (羅半, Rahan)
Voiced by: Toshiyuki Toyonaga (Japanese); Caleb Yen (English)
Lahan is Lakan's biological nephew and Maomao's cousin, whom Lakan adopted as his official heir. Like his uncle, he is a shrewd, observant and cunning young man.
Onsou (卯柳)
Voiced by: Akinori Egoshi (Japanese); Eli Farmer (English)
Onsou is Lakan's new diligent personal aide after Rikuson is sent to the Western Capital.
Gyokuen (素貞)
Voiced by: Hiroshi Shirokuma (Japanese); Phil Parsons (English)
Gyokuyō's benevolent elderly father and the Governor of the Western Capital. He has a wife named Seibo and ten concubines, with many of adopted children, since he is actually sterile.
Uryuu (卯柳)
Voiced by: Naoki Bandō (Japanese); Seth Magill (English)
Lishu's strict father, who used her as a tool to gain power in the imperial court.

== Verdigris House ==
Madam (やり手婆, Yarite Baba)
Voiced by: Kimiko Saitō (Japanese); Wendy Powell (English)
An old woman who owns the Verdigris House brothel and offered Maomao a place to work, treating her like a granddaughter. She has a deal with Maomao not to make her a courtesan as long as she sends the princesses plenty of rich customers from the rear palace and is implied to be Fengxian's biological mother, thus making her Maomao's actual grandmother.

=== The Three Princesses ===
The "Three Princesses" are the most famous courtesans of the Verdigris House (緑青館, Rokushō-kan) brothel where Maomao grew up. Maomao views all three as her sister figures due to the three of them raising her since she was a child.

Pairin (白鈴)
Voiced by: Ami Koshimizu (Japanese); Ciarán Strange (English)
Pairin is the eldest and most prominent of the Three Princesses, renowned for her unrestrained sensuality and fiery demeanor. A skilled dancer, she eventually forms a romantic relationship with Lihaku; however, she will often pounce on fellow courtesans and even manservants if her appetite is not satisfied. Having once served as Maomao's wet nurse during the latter's infancy, Pairin has a more motherly attitude towards her, which Maomao reciprocates.
Meimei (梅梅)
Voiced by: Megumi Han (Japanese); Rebecca Danae (English)
The second-youngest of the Three Princesses, much more emotional than her sisters and skilled in poetry. Due to her role as Fengxian's former apprentice, she is also talented at playing board games.
Joka (女華)
Voiced by: Hiroki Nanami (Japanese); Monica Flatley (English)
The youngest of the Three Princesses, much more aloof, reserved and colder than her sisters. Despite her profession, she dislikes men and refuses to sleep with them, instead preferring to entertain them with music and poetry, although she is still warm and friendly with Maomao.

Fengxian (鳳仙, Fonshen)
Voiced by: Houko Kuwashima (Japanese); Caitlin Glass (English)
Formerly the Verdigris's most valuable courtesan, she contracted a disease due to the nature of her profession, which made her of no use to the brothel. She is Maomao's biological mother, who once chopped off the tip of Maomao's pinky finger while she was an infant, resulting in Maomao's crooked little finger, in order to signify a broken pinky promise and to place a curse on Maomao's biological father, Lakan. Maomao visits her regularly to help manage her disease through Luomen's medicine.
Ukyou (右叫)
Voiced by: Yoshiaki Hasegawa (Japanese); Oscar Seung (English)
Ukyou is the easygoing head of the Verdigris House menservants and the right-hand of the Madam, who sometimes takes care of Chou-U when Maomao is busy.
Kyō-u (響迂) / Chou-u (趙迂)
Voiced by: Natsumi Fujiwara (Japanese); Anne Yatco (English)
Kyō-u, later Chou-u, is a young and cheerful child of the Shi clan, who grew up close to Suirei and later gets taken in by Maomao.
Sazen (左膳)
Voiced by: Tomoaki Maeno (Japanese); Nazeeh Tarsha (English)
Sazen is a former guard who served the Shi Clan. After their rebellion, he escaped to the Royal Capital with many of their books he stolen and became an apprentice apothecary at the Verdigris House after Maomao recruited him.

== Others ==
Luomen (羅門, Rwomen)
Voiced by: Hiroshi Yanaka (Japanese); Stephen Miller (English)
Maomao's adoptive father. She later discovers from court records that he was a former court doctor who was banished from the rear palace. He is revealed to be one of a rare few to have been sent abroad by the empire to study medicine. He is Lakan's uncle, and Maomao's biological grand uncle.
Shishou (子昌)
Voiced by: Chō, Go Inoue (young) (Japanese); Jason Douglas (English)
Loulan's father who is also an influential politician. A Shi clansman from a branch family adopted into the main family to become Shenmei's fiance.
Ayla (姶良, Aira)
Voiced by: Lynn (Japanese); Madeleine Morris (English)
One of the two foreign envoys who came to establish relations with the empire, with the aim of becoming a concubine; but is thwarted. She is colluding with the Shi Clan in their rebellion against the empire.
Aylin (愛凛, Airin)
Voiced by: Yumi Hara (Japanese); Hayden Daviau (English)
The other of the two envoys and Ayla's cousin. She is more quiet and calmer than her cousin.
Shenmei (神美)
Voiced by: Rika Fukami (Japanese); Jessica Calvello (English)
Shenmei was a shrewd concubine of the previous emperor. Kept as a political hostage by the Empress Regnant to ensure the Shi clan's good behavior, she was later bestowed back by the previous emperor after Shishou kept his promise to wed his illegitimate daughter, and raise her child as a Shi clan member.
Sotei (素貞)
Voiced by: Reina Ueda (Japanese); Jad Saxton (English)
Sotei, also known as "The White Lady" (白娘々), due to her albinism, is Lady Ayla's agent. She was meant to become the next Shrine Maiden of Shaoh. However, she never got her chance as the previous shrine maiden failed to give up her position.
