= List of Frieren characters =

The three main characters of the series (from bottom to top), Frieren, Fern and Stark, and additionally, Sein

The Japanese manga series Frieren: Beyond Journey's End features an extensive cast of characters created by Kanehito Yamada and illustrated by Tsukasa Abe. The character names are all German words.

== Frieren's party ==
Frieren (フリーレン, Furīren) (Note: The name is the German verb "to freeze") (Note: In German, the infinitive of a verb may be nominalized, and it is also formally identical to certain present forms (except in case of the verb sein "(to) be"), so (das) Frieren translates to "(the) freezing", while (zu) frieren translates to "(to) freeze" and (wir/sie) frieren to "(we/they) freeze".)

Voiced by: Atsumi Tanezaki (Japanese); Mallorie Rodak (English)
An elven mage over a thousand years old, Frieren is a former member of the Hero Party that defeated the Demon King. Her long lifespan gives her a different perception of time than her human companions. After the death of her comrade Himmel, she embarks on a journey to better understand humanity, taking on a human apprentice, Fern. Over a millennium ago, the mage Flamme saved her from demons, instilling in Frieren a lifelong dedication to eradicating them. She is the mage who has buried the most demons in history, earning her the feared moniker "Frieren the Slayer" (葬送のフリーレン, Sōsō no Furīren) (Note: Sōsō no Furīren (葬送のフリーレン) in Japanese, as the series' title. It could also be translated as "Frieren the Undertaker".) and developing the demon-slaying magic Zoltraak. (Note: Hito o Korosu Mahō (人を殺す魔法) in Japanese, literally translates as "Human Slaying Magic". However, the author intentionally made up the reading as "Zoltraak". It is a form of offensive magic developed by a powerful demon specifically for killing humans. Later, Zoltraak was studied by humanity and eventually incorporated into the foundational magic taught to all modern human mages, where it has been altered into a demon-slaying art.) Though sometimes perceived as aloof due to her occasional social clumsiness, she is inherently kind and caring.
Fern (フェルン, Ferun) (Note: The name is German for "distant" or "far".)

Voiced by: Kana Ichinose (Japanese); Jill Harris (English)
A powerful young mage and Frieren's apprentice. She is a war orphan from a southern country who lost her parents and was about to commit suicide by jumping off a ravine when Heiter rescued her. As a child, she began training in magic under Heiter's tutelage to become more self-sufficient. She later met Frieren, who visited Heiter when she was nine years old, and requested that Frieren teach her magic so she could become a full-fledged mage. After Heiter's death, by which she has turned sixteen, she embarks on a journey as Frieren's apprentice. Later, she becomes a first-class mage after passing the examination. Though she initially treats Stark coldly, she eventually warms up to him as they bond, but still scolds him when he causes trouble.
Stark (シュタルク, Shutaruku) (Note: The name is German for "strong".)

Voiced by: Chiaki Kobayashi, Arisa Kiyoto (child) (Japanese); Jordan Dash Cruz (English)
A young warrior who Eisen raised, who serves as a replacement for him on Frieren's adventure. Since Eisen declines the invitation due to his old age, Stark steps up to be the frontline fighter in battles, a role that Frieren and Fern, being magicians, are unsuited for. Despite his timid nature, Stark is a strong and capable warrior and loyal to his companions. Over time, he develops a deep connection with Fern, evolving from trivial daily arguments to genuine trust and affection.
Sein (ザイン, Zain) (Note: The name is the German verb "to be")
Voiced by: Yuichi Nakamura, Natsumi Kawaida (child) (Japanese); Christopher Wehkamp, Reshel Mae (child) (English)
A village priest who joins Frieren's party on her journey after they meet. Despite being a talented priest, Sein has several vices, including a love for alcohol, cigarettes, gambling, and older women. He travels with Frieren's group for some time, but eventually leaves to search for his best friend Kreis, who embarked on his own adventure a long time ago. Sein reunites with Frieren's party while searching for his friend in Eiseberg, coming to their aid to help fend off the Shadow Warriors and joining the mission to protect Serie after discovering that Kreis is one of them.

== The Hero party ==
The Hero party (from left to right): Heiter, Frieren, Himmel, and Eisen

A group of warriors that Frieren was part of. They journeyed together for ten years until accomplishing their mission of slaying the Demon King, after which they parted ways. Although the group disbanded at the beginning of the story, they appear regularly in flashbacks.

Himmel (ヒンメル, Hinmeru) (Note: The name is German for "heaven")
Voiced by: Nobuhiko Okamoto (Japanese); Clifford Chapin (English)
A human member of the Hero Party. He was the hero of the group and a self-proclaimed handsome man. After seeing a meteor shower together, he and Frieren promise to meet again. He dies shortly after their reunion fifty years later, prompting her to embark on a new journey. Several occasions on their journey showed that he had feelings for Frieren, but Frieren's sense of time and understanding of humans at the time left his feelings ambiguous.
Heiter (ハイター, Haitā) (Note: The name is German for "cheerful" or "serene")
Voiced by: Hiroki Tōchi (Japanese); Jason Douglas (English)
A human member of the Hero Party, who was an alcohol-loving priest. He found, adopted, and raised Fern after the party dissolved, entrusting her to Frieren before his death.
Eisen (アイゼン, Aizen) (Note: The name is German for "iron")
Voiced by: Yōji Ueda (Japanese); Christopher Guerrero (English)
A member of the Hero Party. He is a dwarf who, although not as long-lived as elves, has a significantly longer lifespan than humans. However, despite his extended lifespan, he is past his prime and has grown old. As a result, he declines Frieren's invitation to embark on her new adventure, choosing to spend his remaining days in peace and recommending Stark to accompany her instead.

== Demons ==
A race of beings evolved from monsters and considered natural predators of humankind. While outwardly humanlike, they possess long lifespans, heightened sensitivity to mana, and a congenital absence of emotions such as guilt or compassion, making true communication with other races impossible. Named by the mage Flamme, demons live without families and form meritocratic societies where magical power determines status and pride. They often devote centuries to a single spell, while using common magics casually, and are known for deceiving humans with speech to lower their guard before killing them.

Demon King (魔王, Maō)
An ancient ruler of the demon race who lived for over 1,000 years. Though ultimately defeated by Himmel's hero party, his former castle still stands in Ende, at the continent's northernmost point.
Ironically, the Demon King's desire for "coexistence with humans" led to a devastating war. This conflict decimated both sides, reducing human populations to a third of their peak and bringing demons to the brink of extinction. Under his command were the "Seven Sages of Destruction", powerful demons who controlled key regions of the continent.
The Demon King's legacy continues to impact the world long after his defeat, with his castle and the lingering effects of the war shaping the current geopolitical landscape.

=== Demon King's Confidant ===
Schlacht (シュラハト, Shurahato) (Note: The name is German for "battle".)
Schlacht the Omniscient was a demon who was said to be the Demon King's confidant, who could see into the future, and was said to be capable of seeing forward up to a thousand years. About ten years before the Demon King was defeated, he fought against the Hero of the South, leading all of the Seven Sages of Destruction. However, he was defeated in this battle alongside three of the Sages of Destruction.

=== Seven Sages of Destruction ===
The Seven Sages of Destruction (七崩賢, Shichihōken) were considered the most powerful among the Demon King's Forces. Three of them were slain by the Hero of the South several years before Himmel assembles his party to confront them.

Aura (アウラ, Aura) (Note: The meaning of the name in German is the same as the English word; "aura".)
Voiced by: Ayana Taketatsu (Japanese); Corey Pettit (English)
A member of the Seven Sages of Destruction and an old nemesis of Frieren and the Hero Party, who they managed to defeat many years ago, but she escaped. She wields the Scales of Obedience, which allow her to dominate her opponents and turn them into puppets to decapitate them, which has earned her the moniker "The Guillotine". When she attempts to use the Scales of Obedience on Frieren, she falls under her control instead and decapitates herself by Frieren's orders.
Macht (マハト, Mahato) (Note: The name is German for "might" or "power")
Macht, also known as Macht of Golden Land, is the last surviving member of the Seven Sages of Destruction. For ages, he was trapped in his self-created Golden Land, locked down by a powerful barrier maintained by the Continental Magic Association. Macht possesses exceptional magical abilities, including an unbreakable gold transmutation curse called Diagolze. Despite being described as relatively moderate for a demon, Macht's combat prowess is legendary. Macht's reputation as the strongest of the Seven Sages stems from his ability to effortlessly defeat groups of elite mages, including those of the highest rank. He once bested Frieren 600 years before the main story's events, and his power remains so formidable that even the present-day Frieren considers him nearly unbeatable.
Grausam (グラオザーム, Guraozāmu) (Note: The name is German for "cruel".)
Grausam the Miraculous, a master of powerful mental magic capable of deceiving even the mightiest demons. When Schlacht coerced Macht into joining the battle against the Southern Hero, he brought Grausam along to ensure Macht's compliance. Macht, unable to counter Grausam's illusion magic, was forced to submit.
Later, Grausam assumed a leadership role among a group sent to eliminate Frieren, which included Solitär, Rivale, and Tote. When Tote abandoned the mission, the remaining three launched an assault on Himmel's party. Grausam employed his "Guide to Paradise" (Ancillasiela) spell to trap Himmel and Frieren in an illusion. However, he found himself cornered by Himmel, who could fight even while ensnared in the illusion. Though Grausam seemed poised to unveil a trump card when backed into a corner, Solitär intervened, and they retreated. In the aftermath of the Demon King's defeat, it is said that Grausam, too, met his demise.
Böse (ベーゼ, Bēze) (Note: The name is German for "evil".)
The Immortal Böse was one of the Seven Sages of Destruction. Böse and the other Sages of Destruction fought against Hero of the South, though he survived the encounter. Eventually, he was defeated by the Hero Party after Frieren helped Himmel visualize how to break his nigh impenetrable barrier magic.

=== Greater demons ===
Solitär (ソリテール, Soritēru) (Note: The name is a French loan word in German for "reclusive" or "lonely")
Solitär is a Greater Demon known for her youthful appearance and eccentric interest in studying humanity. Despite her immense magical prowess, rivaling that of Macht, she remains an "unnamed great demon" in human records, likely due to her habit of eliminating all humans she encounters. Solitär played a crucial role in Macht's development, teaching him about convergent evolution and human magic, and later assisted in destroying the great barrier of the Golden Land.
Solitär possesses extraordinary magical abilities, including precise mana control, powerful offensive strikes, and nearly impenetrable defensive capabilities. Her combat skills are so formidable that even Frieren considers her on par with Macht. Solitär is also characterized by her talkative nature, often engaging in prolonged "conversations" to torment her opponents. Her actions are driven by a desire to witness the "tragic end" of coexistence between demons and humans, viewing such ideas as dangerous for demonkind.
Tot (トート, Tōto) (Note: The name is German for "dead".)
Also known as the Saint of the End, she is a Greater Demon, developing a curse powerful enough to envelop the entire planet. Solitär recruits her to fight Himmel's Party in the past, but she retreats, claiming that she is no good at fighting and wants to live peacefully and quietly until the completion of her curse magic. Solitär noted that Tot's battlefield is in the future, long after Demon King was defeated.
Rivale (リヴァーレ, Rivāre) (Note: The name is German for "rival".)
Rivale, also known as the Bloody God of War, is a Greater Demon. Solitär recruits him to fight the Hero Party. His magic is to generate any weapon he wishes to fight with, using this to create an axe to face Eisen with. He survived the encounter and later attacked Stark's village.

=== Other demons ===
Qual (クヴァール, Kuvāru) (Note: The name is German for "torture")
Voiced by: Hiroki Yasumoto (Japanese); Major Attaway (English)
Also Known as the "Elder Sage of Corruption", the Hero Party sealed him away as he was too strong to defeat. Several decades later, Frieren unseals and destroys him with Fern's assistance. Qual is the creator of "Zoltraak", a powerful offensive magic which becomes the mages' standard attack spell after human researchers studied and deciphered it while he was sealed.
Lügner (リュグナー, Ryugunā) (Note: The name is German for "liar")
Voiced by: Junichi Suwabe (Japanese); Blake McNamara (English)
A demon serving under Aura who is tasked with having a town's anti-demon barrier put down under the guise of being a "peace envoy". Fern later kills him when they fight in a duel.
Linie (リーニエ, Rīnie) (Note: The name is German for "line")
Voiced by: Manaka Iwami (Japanese); Dani Chambers (English)
One of Lügner's assistants. She is a demon capable of reading her opponent's mana to use it against them. Stark later kills her when they fight in a duel.
Draht (ドラート, Dorāto) (Note: The name is German for "wire")
Voiced by: Kōki Ōsuzu (Japanese); Kieran Flitton (English)
One of Lügner's assistants, who enters Frieren's prison cell in an attempt to execute her but is killed in the process.
Revolte (レヴォルテ, Revorute) (Note: The name is German for "revolt" or "insurrection")
Voiced by: Shin-ichiro Miki (Japanese); Jonah Scott (English)
Also known as Divine Revolte, he is a four-handed demon general and tactician with the lower body of a snake who wields four swords made of magic. He faces off against Stark and Genau, with whom he has a history.
Hemmung (ヘモン, Hemon) (Note: The name is German for "inhibition".)
Voiced by: Mizuki Ishii (Japanese); Stephen Fu (English)
Hemmung is an observant and calculating demon, whose spell allows his mana to spread and take the shape of mist, which he can then change into energy blasts. He engages Fern and Frieren in battle.
Solide (ゾリダ, Zorida) (Note: The name is German for "solid".)
Voiced by: Miyuki Wakayama (Japanese); Abigail Blythe (English)
Solide is a quiet, blind-folded demon who wields a large magical sword in battle and challenges Methode.
Jung (ユーン, Yuun) (Note: The name is German for "young".)
Voiced by: Tsukino Chikasada (Japanese); Monica Flatley (English)
Jung is a curious demon child, who shows unusual interest in humans.
Zart (ツァルト, Tsaruto) (Note: The name is German for "gentle" or "delicate".)
Zart, also known as The Lingering Shadow, was one of Grausam's servants with a potent personal magic called Spacial Transferrence Magic, allowing him to teleport his opponents high into the sky, which would prove lethal in the era of the Demon King when humanity's magic had not yet learned flight magic from studying demons.

== Mages ==
=== Continental Mage Association ===
Serie (ゼーリエ, Zērie) (Note: The name is German for "series".)
Voiced by: Mariya Ise (Japanese); Anastasia Muñoz (English)
Serie is an ancient elf mage who has existed since time immemorial, revered as a living repository of magical knowledge. As Flamme's mentor and Frieren's acquaintance from a millennium past, she stands closest to the Almighty Goddess in magical prowess. Fifty years before current events, she established the Continental Magic Association to cultivate elite mages from veterans of the Demon King War. Yet none of her disciples ever matched her power, all eventually perishing before her. Even when suppressing her aura, Serie's mere presence terrifies observers. Legendary figures like Macht, Flamme, and even Frieren acknowledge her insurmountable strength. During the first-class mage examinations, she personally evaluates candidates through instinctive judgment rather than conventional testing.
Sense (ゼンゼ, Zenze) (Note: The name is German for "scythe".)
Voiced by: Haruka Terui (Japanese); Lindsay Seidel (English)
A first-class mage and the proctor of the Second Exam in First-Class Mage Examination. She opts for an examination format that avoids pitting candidates against one another. Despite this, she maintains a reputation for being rigorous and pushing mages to their limits.
Genau (ゲナウ, Genau) (Note: The name is German for "exactly")
Voiced by: Tarusuke Shingaki (Japanese); Aaron Roberts (English)
A first-class mage and the proctor of the First Exam in First-Class Mage Examination.
Methode (メトーデ, Metōde) (Note: The name is German for "method".)
Voiced by: Reina Ueda (Japanese); Caitlin Glass (English)
A female mage who initially formed a party with Renge and Ton in the first-stage exam, Methode later teamed up with Denken and others during the second stage. She can use binding and mind-control magic, though these had no effect on Frieren. Skilled at detecting magical energy, Methode is also notable for her rare ability to use healing spells.
During the third-stage exam, Methode flattered Serie—who had stepped in as examiner—by calling her a "cute little one". Amused but caught off guard, Serie dubbed Methode a "weirdo" before awarding her first-class mage status.
Methode herself is battle-hardened, talented, and smart, but has a particular fondness for "cute kids", which explains her easy admiration for both Frieren and Serie.
Falsch (ファルシュ, Farushu) (Note: The name is German for "incorrect" or "fake".)
Voiced by: Kento Shiraishi (Japanese); Dio Garner (English)
A by-the-book first-class mage who was supposed to proctor the third test in the First-Class Exam.
Lernen (レルネン, Rerunen) (Note: The name the German verb "to learn".)
Voiced by: Atsushi Miyauchi (Japanese); Kent Williams (English)
The first mage to ascend to the rank of first-class after the foundation of the Continental Magic Association and an apprentice of the Great Mage Serie.
Lineal (リネアール, Rineāru) (Note: The name is German for "ruler".)
Lineal is a first-class mage who has been undercover as a spy in the Northern Empire for 15 years, under orders from Serie, due to the Empire being hostile towards the Continental Magic Association.

=== Other Mages ===
Denken (デンケン, Denken) (Note: The name is the German verb "to think".)
Voiced by: Jiro Saito (Japanese); Ben Phillips (English)
Denken is an elderly second-class mage and a seasoned military veteran who becomes a shrewd court magician. After losing his wife, Lektüre, in his mid-twenties, he remains childless. Trained in magic and combat under Macht of the Golden Land, he is inspired by Frieren and adopts a similar philosophy toward magic. Though they never meet before, he recognizes her during the first-class mage exam and challenges her, only to be soundly defeated. Despite this, his skill rivals that of a first-class mage. He is composed, perceptive, and pragmatic, willing to fight physically when depleted of mana. He shows kindness to younger mages like Laufen and Richter and maintains ties with former comrades. During the exam, Serie promotes him to first-class mage. His past includes serving alongside Lernen at court, and his hometown in the Northern Highlands is petrified by Macht's curse. Tasked with maintaining the Golden Land's barrier, he later confronts Macht using Serie's spell, Mysteilzila, which reflects curses. Though briefly turned to gold, Frieren restores him. Despite Macht's overwhelming power, Denken withstands the assault and delivers a decisive Zoltraak, securing a hard-fought victory.
Übel (ユーベル, Yūberu) (Note: The name is German for "evil".)
Voiced by: Ikumi Hasegawa (Japanese); Morgan Berry (English)
A sadistic and violent mage who was previously disqualified from the second-class mage exam for murdering an exam proctor. She has a twisted fascination with combat and derives pleasure from killing, making her a formidable and unsettling ally.
Übel wields cleaving magic, an invisible spell capable of slicing through nearly anything she visualizes as cuttable. Her arsenal includes another formidable spell, cementing her reputation as a dangerous combatant. During the first-class mage examination, Serie recognizes her prowess and grants her promotion. Following her certification, she partners with Land on an imperial mission to thwart an assassination plot against Serie. The two collaborate to investigate and gather intelligence on the threat.
Land (ラント, Ranto) (Note: The name is the German noun "land".)
Voiced by: Shohei Komatsu (Japanese); Corey Wilder (English)
Land is Fern's teammate, a cautious and calculating mage who maintains emotional distance from others. His self-preservation instincts shape his magic, enabling him to create flawless clones that can act in his stead—even taking the first-class mage exam while he remains safely at home. Though Serie detects the deception, she approves of his clever approach and grants him first-class status. During Übel's visit to his village, Land reveals his past: he once lived there with his grandmother and became psychologically trapped after her death. Later, he partners with Übel on an imperial mission to investigate an assassination plot against Serie.
Wirbel (ヴィアベル, Viaberu) (Note: The name is German for "whirl".)
Voiced by: Kishō Taniyama (Japanese); Ricco Fajardo, Meg McClain (young) (English)
A second-class mage with lots of live combat experience, who takes part in the exam to become first-class, and is the captain of the Northern Magic Corps. He later passes the exam after showing interest in combat magic aligning with Serie's interest.
Kanne (カンネ, Kanne) (Note: The name is German for "pot" or "jug".)
Voiced by: Azumi Waki (Japanese); Madeleine Morris (English)
A timid third-class mage who can control water and is one of Frieren's teammates during the First-Class Mage Examination. She has a confrontational relationship with Lawine, as they grew up together and Lawine both belittled and supported her.
Lawine (ラヴィーネ, Ravīne) (Note: The name is German for "avalanche".)
Voiced by: Sayumi Suzushiro (Japanese); Rebecca Danae (English)
Frieren's other teammate during the First-Class Mage Examination. She is a third-class mage who can turn water into ice and works well alongside Kanne, as they grew close despite her negative attitude.
Edel (エーデル, Ēderu) (Note: The name is German for "noble".)
Voiced by: Tomoyo Kurosawa (Japanese); Nia Celeste (English)
A level-headed second-class mage participating in the exam, who specializes in hypnosis magic.
Richter (リヒター, Rihitā) (Note: The name is German for "judge".)
Voiced by: Eiji Hanawa (Japanese); Ian Moore (English)
A second-class mage participating in the exam and Denken's teammate. He also runs a magical store, where he specializes in repairing broken staves.
Scharf (シャルフ, Sharufu) (Note: The name is German for "sharp".)
Voiced by: Yuji Murai (Japanese); Alejandro Saab (English)
A second-class mage and one of Wirbel's teammates, whose specialized magic allows him to transform flower petals into steel blades.
Laufen (ラオフェン, Raofen) (Note: The name is the German verb "to walk")
Voiced by: Shizuka Ishigami (Japanese); Marisa Duran (English)
A second-class mage in Denken's team who specializes in movement magic, allowing her to move at high speeds.
Ehre (エーレ, Ēre) (Note: The name is German for "honor".)
Voiced by: Kanae Itō (Japanese); Trina Nishimura (English)
A powerful second-class mage who is in Wirbel's team with Scharf, whose specialized magic allows her to control rocks. She is the granddaughter of Lernen.
Blei (ブライ, Burai) (Note: The name the German verb "lead".)
Voiced by: Shinya Takahashi (Japanese); Brent Mukai (English)
A mage and one of Edel's teammates.
Dünste (ドゥンスト, Dunsuto) (Note: The name is German for "steam".)
Voiced by: Masafumi Kobatake (Japanese); Christopher Sabat (English)
An older mage and Edel's other teammate.
Ton (トーン, Tōn) (Note: The name is German for "tone".)
Voiced by: Taito Ban (Japanese); Kyle Igneczi (English)
A mage with a lone-wolf attitude who participates in the exam.

== The Northern Empire ==
=== Governing Faction ===
Emperor (皇帝, Kōtei)
The Northern Empire's ruler. He is a calm and collected man who is disillusioned with the Empire's current state of matters.
Löwe (レーヴェ, Rēve) (Note: The name is German for "lion".)
Löwe is the callous, eye-patch wearing Governor-General of Lorbeer, the northernmost territory of the Empire. In reality, he is a high-ranking Shadow Warrior named Held (ヘルト, Heruto) (Note: The name is German for "hero".), who is rumored to have eliminated the elven Great Mage Minus in the past and whose main objective is to eliminate magic from the world for reasons yet unknown.

=== Special Forces of Magic ===
Phrase (フラアセ, Furāse) (Note: The name is German for "phrase".)
Phrase is the captain of the Special Forces of Magic, who is a considerably powerful mage and willing to prevent any disturbance in the festival, be it from outsiders or the Shadow Warriors, given that Macht suggested that she was a threat only he could handle, when she visited the city of his master.
Kanone (カノーネ, Kanōne) (Note: The name is German for "cannon".)
Kanone is a member of the Empire's Special Forces of Magic. She and her partner Neu are assigned to patrol a major social gathering that Land and Übel are sent to infiltrate.
Neu (ノイ, Noi) (Note: The name is German for "new".)
Neu is a member of the Empire's Special Forces of Magic. He and his partner Kanone are assigned to patrol a major social gathering, where he barges in on Land and Übel, who are undercover and pretending to be fooling around in a storage room.
Grau (グラウ, Gurau) (Note: The name is German for "grey".)
Grau is a straight-laced young member of the Empire's Special Forces of Magic. He and his partner Lager are assigned to patrol the ball and to protect Serie's group.
Lager (ラゲル, Rageru) (Note: The name is German for "warehouse".)
Lager is a carefree young member of the Empire's Special Forces of Magic. He and his partner Grau are assigned to patrol the ball and to protect Serie's group.

=== Shadow Warriors ===
The Shadow Warriors are an assassin organization commissioned by the Northern Empire decades prior to eliminate designated targets in secret as such they are adept at concealing mana which makes them a threat even to experienced mages. The Shadow Warriors have the authority to perform independently which sometimes leads them to conflict with other branches of the government's army such as the Special Forces of Magic.

Radar (レーダー, Rēdā) (Note: The name is German for "radar".)
Radar is an elderly village chief in the Northern Plateau, who upon encountering Frieren's party, reveals himself to be a member of the Shadow Warriors.
Schritt (シュリト, Shuritto) (Note: The name is German for "step".)
Schritt is a Shadow Warrior posing as a drunkard, who is assigned a new mission by Löwe. She's also Kreis' younger sister.
Wolf (ヲルフ, Worufu) (Note: The name is German for "wolf".)
Wolf is a Shadow Warrior posing as the barkeeper indulging Schritt, who receives a new mission from Löwe.
Iris (イリス, Irisu) (Note: The name is German for "iris".)
Iris is a Shadow Warrior who poses as the poster girl of Wolf's liquor shop.
Routine (ルティネ, Rutine) (Note: The name is German for "routine".)
Routine is a Shadow Warrior in the guise of the town librarian.
Walross (ワルロッス, Warurossu) (Note: The name is German for "walrus".)
Walross is an elderly Shadow Warrior disguised as a beggar. Eighty years ago however, he was known as the Hero Rasen, who reclaimed a third of the Northern territories from the Demon King.
Klematis (クレマティス, Kurematisu) (Note: The name is German for "clematis".)
Klematis is a Shadow Warrior posing as a priest.
Lore (ロレ, Rore) (Note: The name is German for "lore".)
Lore is a Shadow Warrior disguised as a nun.
Gazelle (ガゼレ, Gazere) (Note: The name is German for "gazelle".)
Gazelle is a young Shadow Warrior under the guise of a stallholder.
Kreis (クライス, Kuraisu) (Note: The name is German for "circle".) / Gorilla Warrior (戦士 ゴリラ, Senshi Gorira)
Voiced by: Hiromichi Tezuka, Satsuki Kokubu (young) (Japanese); Nazeeh Tarsha (English)
Kreis (known as Gorilla Warrior in Sein's youth) is a Warrior and Sein's childhood best friend, who dreamed of going on an adventure and becoming a legendary hero. As a child, he asked Sein to go on an adventure together, but when the latter refused, Gorilla went out into the world and proclaimed he will return in three years, but has been missing for ten years, so Sein joins Frieren's party initially to find him. It is later revealed that he became a Shadow Warrior under the guise of a blacksmith for reasons yet unknown. He is also Schritt's older brother.

== Other characters ==
Flamme (フランメ, Furanme) (Note: The name is German for "flame".)
Voiced by: Atsuko Tanaka (Japanese); Lydia Mackay (English)
Flamme is the legendary human mage who pioneered humanity's earliest magical arts. While scholars question the veracity of some works attributed to her, historical records confirm her existence approximately a thousand years before present events. Originally Serie's apprentice, she later mentored Frieren, imparting not just spells but the philosophy of strategic concealment—masking true power until the opportune moment. After saving Frieren from a destroyed elf village, Flamme cultivated her pupil's discipline through lessons in patience and deception. Her pragmatic teachings emphasized suppressing magical presence to gain advantage against stronger foes. Among her creations was a simple spell that conjured luminous flowers, which became an enduring symbol of hope. When Flamme eventually died of natural causes, Frieren fulfilled her final request by blanketing her grave with the radiant blossoms they both cherished.
Granat (グラナト, Guranato) (Note: The name is German for "garnet".)
Voiced by: Shunsuke Sakuya (Japanese); John Burgmeier (English)
The current graf of the town of Granat, which his long line of ancestors also led. He tries to encourage peace talks with the demons, specifically with Aura's executioners, but he secretly harbors hate towards them and seeks vengeance for the death of his son.
Kraft (クラフト, Kurafuto) (Note: The name is German for "power" or "strength".)
Voiced by: Takehito Koyasu (Japanese); Orion Pitts (English)
An ancient elven monk who has lived for several millennia. When Frieren and her companions encounter him, he is stranded in a cabin deep in the Schwer Mountains during a severe blizzard. The party spends six months sheltering alongside Kraft until the storm passes, gaining insight from his calm demeanor and age-old wisdom before eventually continuing on their separate journeys.
Sword Village Chief (剣の里の里長, Tsurugi no Sato no Satōsa)
Voiced by: Konomi Kohara (Japanese); Megan Shipman (English)
The young chief of a secluded village, which protects a holy sword that is destined for a legendary hero to wield. She is the granddaughter of the previous village chief, who greeted Himmel and his party during their journey to defeat the Demon King.
Stoltz (シュトルツ, Shutorutsu) (Note: The name is German for "pride".)
Voiced by: Takuya Eguchi (Japanese); Dalton Walker (English)
Stark's older brother. Unlike the other villagers, who view Stark as a failure, Stoltz treats him kindly and helps him train. He is killed when a demon legion invades their village and he sacrifices himself so Stark can escape.
Stark's father
Voiced by: Yasuyuki Kase (Japanese); Gerardo Davila (English)
Stark's cold and stern father, who values strength above all else.
Sein's older brother
Voiced by: Daisuke Hirakawa (Japanese); Jim Foronda (English)
Sein's older brother, who is the head priest of a small northern village and one of Heiter's former apprentices.
Orden (オルデン, Oruden) (Note: The name is German for "order".)
Voiced by: Yūya Uchida (Japanese); Robert McCollum (English)
A nobleman presiding over the Vorig Fortified City and the current head of the Orden family, one of the Three Great Knightly Houses of the Northern Lands. He pays Frieren's party so Stark can assume the role of his deceased son for a few months in an effort to avoid scaring the citizens.
Voll (フォル, Foru) (Note: The name is German for "full".)
Voiced by: Mitsuaki Hoshino (Japanese); Mac McGee (English)
A 400-year old dwarf and Frieren's old friend, who outlived the average dwarf life expectancy and stands guard to protect his long-passed human wife's hometown, following his promise to her that he would always protect it.
Lecker (レケル, Rekeru) (Note: The name is German for "delicious".)
Voiced by: Shinji Kawada (Japanese); Kamen Casey (English)
Lecker is a highly talented cook based in Äußerst, who hired Himmel's party in the past to retrieve a family heirloom knife from a demon, and in return promised to make tasty food for centuries to come, so that Frieren could enjoy it.
Hero of the South (南の勇者, Minami no Yūsha)
Voiced by: Kazuhiko Inoue (Japanese); Brian Mathis (English)
The Hero of the South was humanity's mightiest warrior during the war against demons, predating Himmel's legendary party. With unmatched combat prowess, he made his final stand at the Northern Plateau against all seven Sages of Destruction and their strategist Schlacht. Though falling in battle, he slew three Sages and defeated Schlacht first. Like his demonic counterpart, he possessed precognition. His visions led him to instruct Frieren to eventually join Himmel's party, ensuring his legacy would endure through future heroes. His sacrifice remains a testament to human resilience against demonkind's threat.
Fass (ファス, Fasu) (Note: The name is German for "barrel".)
Voiced by: Yūji Ueda (Japanese); Justin Cook (English)
Fass is a dwarf Himmel's Party encountered, and later Frieren's Party as well, who has been looking for the Emperor Alcohol brewed by the once renowned "Boshaft Empire" for over two centuries.
Milliarde (ミリアルデ, Miriarude) (Note: The name is German for "billion".)
Voiced by: Mamiko Noto (Japanese); Monica Rial (English)
Milliarde is an old acquaintance and fellow elf of Frieren, who carved an inscription in ancient Elvish that described the "Boshaft" spirit as the "finest spirit", despite it tasting horrid on a whim.
Gehen (ゲヘン) (Note: The name is German for "to go".)
Voiced by: Tōru Ōkawa (Japanese); Dane Petersen (English)
Gehen is a dwarf on the Northern Plateau, who spent two hundred years building a bridge over the Great Tor Canyo.
Glück (グリュック, Guryukku) (Note: The name is German for "luck".)
Glück, the feudal lord of Weise, formed an alliance with Macht eighty years prior to restore his city's prosperity after his son's assassination. Seeing in Macht a demon genuinely interested in human emotions, Glück supported his experiments to understand feelings like rage, guilt, and sorrow. Their collaboration revitalized Weise until Macht, seeking to experience human emotions firsthand, petrified the entire city—including Glück—into golden statues. Glück accepted this fate without remorse, while Macht failed to evoke the emotions he desired. Five decades later, Frieren lifted the curse, restoring Weise and its inhabitants. The city's revival marked the bittersweet conclusion to Glück and Macht's unprecedented partnership.
Lektüre (レクテュール, Rekutyūru) (Note: The name is German for "reading".)
Lektüre is the daughter of Glück and the late wife of Denken. She was a childhood friend of Denken and had a frail body which eventually resulted in her succumbing to her death.
