= Friday Anime Night =

Japanese late-night anime programming block

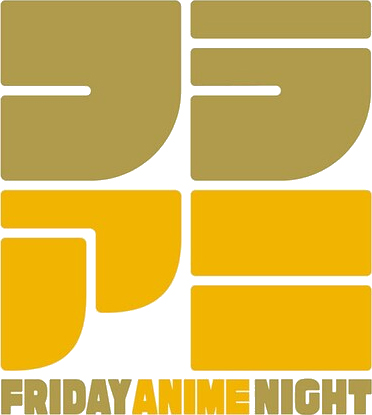
- Friday Anime Night's logo since its inception in October 2023
- Network: Nippon TV
- Launched: October 6, 2023; 3 years ago
- Division of: NNS
- Country of origin: Japan
- Format: Anime
- Running time: Fridays 23:00–24:00 (JST)
- Original language: Japanese
- Official website: Official website

Friday Anime Night (stylized in all caps), also known as Furaani (フラアニ), is a Japanese late-night anime programming block produced by Nippon TV under the NNS affiliation. The block airs on Friday nights from 23:00 to 24:00 JST (effectively Friday nights from 11:00 p.m. to Saturday midnight JST).

== History ==
In October 2023, Nippon TV established a new programming timeslot entirely dedicated to anime. The block broadcasts nationwide on the channel and its network under the NNS affiliation, and airs on Friday nights at 23:00 JST, following after the network's long-running Kin'yō Road Show movie block.

Frieren: Beyond Journey's End became the first program to air on the timeslot, premiering its first 4 episodes on the network's Friday Road Show movie block as a 2-hour special, with subsequent episodes aired in the newly established timeslot thereafter.

Starting in April 2026, the block expanded into a one-hour timeslot, with Snowball Earth becoming the first program to air at the 23:30 JST timeslot.

== Titles ==
| No. | Title | Time Slot | Start date | End date | Eps. | Studio(s) | Notes | Ref. |
|---|---|---|---|---|---|---|---|---|
| 1 | Frieren: Beyond Journey's End | 23:00 | October 6, 2023 (Note: The series premiered with a 4-episode special on September 29, 2023, on Nippon TV's Friday Road Show; subsequent episodes from October 6 of the same year onwards, airs on the block.) | March 22, 2024 | 28 | Madhouse | Based on the manga series written by Kanehito Yamada and illustrated by Tsukasa Abe. | |
| 2 | That Time I Got Reincarnated as a Slime (season 3) | 23:00 | April 5, 2024 | September 27, 2024 | 24 | Eight Bit | Based on the novel series by Fuse. Sequel to That Time I Got Reincarnated as a Slime season 2. | |
| 3 | Magilumiere Magical Girls Inc. | 23:00 | October 4, 2024 | December 20, 2024 | 12 | J.C.Staff; Moe | Based on the manga series written by Sekka Iwata and illustrated by Yu Aoki. | |
| 4 | The Apothecary Diaries (season 2) (Note: The first season aired from October 22, 2023, to March 24, 2024, on NTV and its affiliates, but at different times.) | 23:00 | January 10, 2025 | July 4, 2025 | 24 | Toho Animation Studio; OLM | Based on the novel series by Hyūganatsu. Sequel to The Apothecary Diaries. | |
| 5 | Tougen Anki | 23:00 | July 11, 2025 | December 26, 2025 | 24 | Studio Hibari | Based on the manga series by Yura Urushibara. | |
| 6 | Frieren: Beyond Journey's End (season 2) | 23:00 | January 16, 2026 | March 27, 2026 | 10 | Madhouse | Sequel to Frieren: Beyond Journey's End. | |
| 7 | That Time I Got Reincarnated as a Slime (season 4, parts 1 & 2) | 23:00 | April 3, 2026 | September 25, 2026 | 24 | Eight Bit | Sequel to That Time I Got Reincarnated as a Slime season 3. | |
| 8 | Snowball Earth | 23:30 (Note: Starting April 2026, Friday Anime Night is extended to an hour-long timeslot.) | April 3, 2026 | June 26, 2026 | 13 | Studio Kai | Based on the manga series by Yuhiro Tsujitsugu. | |
| 9 | Draw This, Then Die! | 23:30 | July 3, 2026 | September 25, 2026 | 12 | Shin-Ei Animation | Based on the manga series by Minoru Toyoda. | |
| 10 | The Apothecary Diaries (season 3, part 1) | 23:00 | October 2, 2026 | TBA | TBA | OLM | Sequel to The Apothecary Diaries season 2. | |
| 11 | Tougen Anki: Nikko Kegon Falls Arc | 23:30 | October 2, 2026 | TBA | TBA | Studio Hibari | Sequel to Tougen Anki. | |
| 12 | The Guy She Was Interested in Wasn't a Guy at All | 23:00 | January 8, 2027 | TBA | TBA | CloverWorks | Based on the manga series by Sumiko Arai. | |
| 13 | BanG Dream! MyGO!!!!! // Ave Mujica | 23:30 | January 8, 2027 | TBA | TBA | TBA | Spin-off of the main BanG Dream! anime series. Sequel to BanG Dream! It's MyGO!!!!! and BanG Dream! Ave Mujica Prima Aurora. | |
| 14 | The Apothecary Diaries (season 3, part 2) | 23:00 | April 2027 | TBA | TBA | OLM | Second part of The Apothecary Diaries season 3. | |
| 15 | Tougen Anki: Nikko Kegon Falls Arc (part 2) | 23:30 | April 2027 | TBA | TBA | Studio Hibari | Second part of Tougen Anki: Nikko Kegon Falls Arc. | |
| TBA | Frieren: Beyond Journey's End (season 3) | TBA | October 2027 | TBA | TBA | Madhouse | Sequel to Frieren: Beyond Journey's End season 2. | |

== See also ==
- Late-night anime programming blocks in Japan
- Other anime programming blocks by Nippon TV
  - AnichU, airing on Tuesday nights/Wednesday mornings.
