= List of The Apothecary Diaries episodes =

Key visual for the series

The Apothecary Diaries is a Japanese anime television series based on the light novel series The Apothecary Diaries, written by Hyūganatsu, and illustrated by Touko Shino. Produced by Toho Animation Studio and OLM, the series was written by Norihiro Naganuma and directed by Naganuma and Akinori Fudesaka. Yukiko Nakatani designed the characters. The first season ran from October 22, 2023, to March 24, 2024, on Nippon TV and its affiliates.

Its soundtrack was composed by Satoru Kōsaki, Kevin Penkin, and Alisa Okehazama. The initial opening theme song was "Hana ni Natte" (花になって; lit. 'Be a Flower'), performed by Ryokuoushoku Shakai; the ending theme song was "Aikotoba" (アイコトバ; lit. 'The Spell'), performed by Aina the End. The songs were changed to the opening theme song "Ambivalent" (アンビバレント) (performed by Uru) and the ending theme song is "Ai wa Kusuri" (愛は薬; lit. 'Love Is Medicine'), performed by Wacci.

After the first season was broadcast, a second season was announced. It aired from January 10 to July 4, 2025, on Nippon TV's Friday Anime Night and its affiliates. The first opening theme song is "Hyakka Ryōran" (百花繚乱; lit. 'Splendid Bounty') (performed by Lilas Ikuta) and the first ending theme song is "Shiawase no Recipe" (幸せのレシピ; lit. 'The Recipe for Happiness'), performed by Dai Hirai. The second opening theme song is "Kusushiki" (クスシキ; lit. 'Mysterious') (performed by Mrs. Green Apple) and the second ending theme song is "Hitorigoto" (ひとりごと; lit. 'Soliloquy'), performed by Omoinotake.

After the second season was broadcast, a sequel to the series was announced. On the second anniversary of the anime's premiere, a third season was announced that premiered on October 2, 2026. The season, now produced solely by OLM, will run in two parts, with its second part premiering in April 2027. The first opening theme song is "Kumo o Nukekazashimo e Watashidake" (雲を抜け風下へ私だけ; lit. 'Beyond the Clouds, Only Me Downwind') (performed by Yorushika) and the first ending theme song is "AIYOU", performed by Eve. An animated film titled The Apothecary Diaries: The Late Lady's Treasure (with a new story by Hyūganatsu) was also announced, and is scheduled to premiere in Japan on December 11, 2026. The movie will be produced solely by Toho Animation Studio. Crunchyroll had acquired the North American and worldwide rights (excluding Asia but including India) for the film.

Crunchyroll is streaming the series worldwide outside Asia, in addition to the Middle East, the CIS (excluding Russia and Belarus), and South Asia. The first cours of the first season was released on Blu-ray on January 28, 2025, while the second cours was released on March 25 of the same year. The second season was released on November 10, 2026. Netflix streams the series in some Asian regions.

== Series overview ==
Season	Episodes		Originally released	
Season	Episodes		First released	Last released
1	24		October 22, 2023	March 24, 2024
2	24		January 10, 2025	July 4, 2025
3	24	12	October 2, 2026	TBA
3	24	12	April 2027	TBA

== Episodes ==
=== Season 1 (2023–24) ===
No. overall	No. in season	Title	Directed by (Note: Production staff information is taken from the ending credits of each episode.)	Written by	Storyboarded by	Original release date (Note: Nippon TV lists the series premiere as airing on October 21 at 25:05, which is effectively October 22 at 1:05 a.m. JST.)	Viewership rating
1	1	"Maomao" (Japanese: 猫猫)	Akinori Fudesaka	Yūko Kakihara	Norihiro Naganuma	October 22, 2023 (Note: The first three episodes of the series premiered back-to-back-to-back.)	N/A
Maomao, daughter of an apothecary on the outskirts of the city, is kidnapped by bandits and sold to the imperial palace as a laundry woman serving the emperor's concubines, eunuchs, and their staffs in the rear palace. She sees a fight three months later between two of the concubines, Lihua and Gyokuyou, as rumors swirl that both their children are getting sick and dying from a curse. Maomao deduces the cause from the symptoms, and leaves an anonymous message on the windowsill of each concubine telling them to stop using lead-based face-powder. Lihua's lady-in-waiting ignores the message, and Lihua's son dies. Gyokuyou heeds the message, and her daughter lives. Jinshi, an attractive eunuch, learns that Maomao is the savior. He introduces her to Gyokuyou to explain how the face powder was linked to her daughter's illness, and Gyokuyou thanks her by making her a lady-in-waiting.
2	2	"Chilly Apothecary"; Transliteration: "Buaisō na Kusushi" (Japanese: 無愛想な薬師)	Kentarō Fujita	Misuzu Chiba	Norihiro Naganuma	October 22, 2023	N/A
While soldiers try to pacify an outside village they are mysteriously poisoned during a meal, prompting Jinshi to judge the village leader accused of the act. Maomao begins her new role as a lady-in-waiting to Gyokuyou. The other attendants pity her for her bandaged arm and position as food taster, often finishing her chores. The restless Maomao quickly masters her duties. When Jinshi requests her insight into the soldiers' poisoning, she deduces that the culprit was not the food but toxic fumes from the wood the soldiers burned for kindling. Jinshi assigns her to create an aphrodisiac, giving her access to the court physician's medicinal supplies. Maomao experiments with cocoa, formulating a chocolate-based tonic. While gathering herbs in the garden, she learns that three of Gyokuyou's attendants have already eaten the test chocolates. Alarmed, Maomao says that the concoction's potency is triple that of a standard aphrodisiac. When Gyokuyou later asks if any of it might be used for the emperor, Maomao's warning about its overwhelming effects leaves the consort trembling with unease.
3	3	"The Unsettling Matter of the Spirit"; Transliteration: "Yūrei Sōdō" (Japanese: 幽霊騒動)	Kyohei Yamamoto	Hitomi Ogawa	Norihiro Naganuma	October 22, 2023	N/A
Rumors spread through the palace of a ghostly woman dancing along the eastern wall in the moonlight. When Jinshi's attendant Gaoshun investigates with Maomao they learn that the dancer is Fuyou, a mid-level concubine who sought the emperor's favor but failed to entice him. After losing his attention, she was promised to a military officer in the imperial army. Fuyou appeared to go mad, spending her nights dancing under the moon. The next day Maomao tells Gyokuyou and Jinshi about a courtesan she knew who, overwhelmed with stress before being bought by a wealthy patron, began sleepwalking without remembering it. Maomao reveals the full story: the courtesan feigned insanity to lower her price, ensuring that she would be sold to a man she loved. Maomao concludes that Fuyou intentionally mirrored this behavior. Realizing that the general to whom she would be sold was her beloved from her hometown, Fuyou staged her "madness" to fall out of the emperor's favor. What appeared to be madness, Maomao suggests, was a calculated act born of love.
4	4	"The Threat"; Transliteration: "Dōkatsu" (Japanese: 恫喝)	China	Yūko Kakihara	China	October 29, 2023	N/A
The emperor asks Maomao to care for Lady Lihua, whose mysterious illness has persisted despite treatment. Lihua's overprotective attendants repeatedly expel Maomao from her chamber, preventing her from helping. Jinshi uses his charm to persuade the attendants to allow Maomao to work uninterrupted. Maomao prescribes a diet to purge Lihua's body of toxins and learns that her lady-in-waiting continued to use the same beauty powder that had been previously identified as poisonous. Maomao slaps the lady-in-waiting and pours the powder over her, reminding her that its poisonous ingredients were responsible for the death of Lihua's son. The woman is detained and reinstated after expressing remorse, and the eunuch who procured the substance is whipped. Maomao asks Jinshi to build a sauna so steam baths can aid Lihua's recovery. After two months, Lihua's health is restored. Before returning to Lady Gyokuyou's service, Maomao discreetly teaches Lihua techniques from her brothel sisters to regain the emperor's favor. The techniques are effective; the emperor's visits to Gyokuyou become less frequent, allowing her a long-awaited reprieve.
5	5	"Covert Operations"; Transliteration: "An'yaku" (Japanese: 暗躍)	Gaku Shiga	Misuzu Chiba	Akinori Fudesaka	November 6, 2023	N/A
As Maomao and the court doctor enjoy some grilled matsutake mushrooms, someone comes into the clinic asking for a cure to a "curse". Maomao gives the patient ointment to heal the rash on the patient's arms. Jinshi asks her opinion on a few substances, since he is also looking for what caused the "curse". A garden party is approaching and the emperor's top-tier consorts will be attending, including Lihua and Gyokuyou; Maomao must also attend as Gyokuyou's lady-in-waiting. While applying Maomao's makeup, the other ladies-in-waiting discover that her freckles are painted on; she uses them to make herself less attractive, deterring would-be rapists in the brothel district. Jinshi learns more about Maomao's background and, sympathetic about her hardships, gives her one of his hairpins. Gyokuyou (who "marked" her earlier with a necklace) becomes jealous because "she is no longer hers alone". The garden party begins.
6	6	"The Garden Party"; Transliteration: "En'yūkai" (Japanese: 園遊会)	Wataru Nakagawa	Hitomi Ogawa	Wataru Nakagawa	November 12, 2023	N/A
During the garden party, Maomao is involved in conflict with the concubines' ladies-in-waiting; one of Lihua's ladies criticizes her, not knowing she is in front of her. She receives two more hairpins (one from Lady Lihua) and learns about an alleged rift between consorts Ah-Duo and Lishu. Maomao learns that Gyokuyou's soup is poisoned, and an officer collapses after trying it. Jinshi sees her vomiting, and brings her to the infirmary. Maomao asks Jinshi for Lishu and her food taster, and learns that she is allergic to mackerel. Knowing that the rear palace prepared the food, the vinegar in Lishu's dish may have been accidentally switched with that in Gyokuyou's. Maomao knows that Lishu's food taster may have done it, but does not accuse her and gives her a list of the foods Lishu cannot eat. Jinshi asks Maomao if Lishu is the target of the poisoning.
7	7	"Homecoming"; Transliteration: "Satogaeri" (Japanese: 里帰り)	Tadao Ōkubo	Yūko Kakihara	Norihiro Naganuma	November 19, 2023	N/A
Recovering from her garden-party poisoning, Maomao asks Lady Gyokuyou to use the parlor. At Jinshi's request, Gaoshun delivers the silver bowl that held the poisoned soup (wrapped to avoid contact). Using forensics from her brothel days, Maomao dusts the bowl with powder, cotton, and a brush and finds four fingerprints; one belongs to an outsider. This and with her observation that Lishu's clothing clashed with Gyokuyou's during the party makes Maomao suspect that Lishu is being bullied by her attendants. The poisoned soup was meant for Lishu, but her food taster switched the bowls; Lishu is allergic to mackerel, and Gyokuyou was inadvertently endangered. Maomao learns from Xiaolan that ornamental hairpins are "tickets" for earning favors in the palace. Wanting to go outside, she persuades Lihaku (a soldier who once gave her a hairpin) to escort her by promising introductions to the courtesans known as the "Three Princesses" from the Verdigris brothel. Maomao visits her father, who says wryly that her employment in the rear palace is a twist of fate.
8	8	"Wheat Stalks"; Transliteration: "Mugiwara" (Japanese: 麦稈)	Kentarō Fujita	Yuniko Ayana	Kentarō Fujita	November 26, 2023	N/A
Returning from a walk through the herb fields, Maomao meets a frantic servant pounding on her door who begs her for help. The girl brings her to a brothel where a courtesan and a well-dressed customer have been poisoned. Maomao purges the toxins from both, identifying the cause as tobacco poisoning (probably from a double-suicide attempt). When the brothel's madam recognizes Maomao and her father, Maomao sees the servant girl preparing to stab the customer and stops her. Another courtesan says that the man (a wealthy merchant's son) had seduced and abandoned many women, including the servant girl's sister. Maomao realizes that the apparent suicide was revenge; the courtesan tricked the man into drinking a poisoned tobacco infusion through a straw hidden among the beverages. Her intervention prevents both deaths and a potential scandal, earning her hush money from the madam. After being pampered by Meimei in the Verdigris baths, Maomao visits a bedridden woman in an annex. Three days later she returns to the palace, where an anxious Jinshi greets her. Her teasing remarks about Lihaku fluster him, amusing Lady Gyokuyou.
9	9	"Suicide or Murder?"; Transliteration: "Jisatsu ka Tasatsu ka" (Japanese: 自殺か他殺か)	Akira Koremoto	Misuzu Chiba	Norihiro Naganuma	December 3, 2023	N/A
Still shaken by Maomao's homecoming, Jinshi struggles until Gyokuyou explains the misunderstanding. A eunuch rushes in to report the death of Kounen, a high-ranking official who collapsed after a night of heavy drinking. Maomao deduces that his death was due to salt poisoning; the salt was probably slipped into his drink by someone at the party, as a prank or for spite. Maomao hints at the culprit's identity, but does not name them. Jinshi jokingly proposes outlawing underage drinking, horrifying the liquor-loving apothecary. The court doctor asks Maomao to perform an autopsy on a drowned servant woman but, as an apothecary, dissecting humans is taboo. She debates between suicide and murder; scaling the palace wall with bound feet would be impossible, and the woman's bloodied fingers suggest a struggle to escape the moat. The discovery of a will rules it suicide, linking her to the garden-party poisoning. Maomao muses about her preferred poison, further unnerving Jinshi. Fengming, Lady Ah-Duo's head attendant, reportedly has mysterious burns connected to the "curse" two months earlier.
10	10	"Honey"; Transliteration: "Hachimitsu" (Japanese: 蜂蜜)	Erkin Kawabata	Hitomi Ogawa	Kazuya Nomura	December 10, 2023	N/A
Rumors spread through the rear palace about the drowned servant from the Garnet Pavilion accused of poisoning concubine Lishu's food, and gossip hints that concubine Ah-Duo may lose her position to a younger rival; she is connected to the former emperor. During a tea party with Gyokuyou and Lishu, Maomao notices bullying by Lishu's attendants (especially when Lishu hesitates to drink the honeyed tea). Maomao learns that Jinshi orchestrated the tea party for a hidden purpose, and sends her to assist Ah-Duo without explanation. She deduces that Fengming, Ah-Duo's head attendant, may be using colored message plates to communicate secretly. When Jinshi teases Maomao with honey, it triggers a realization linking Lishu's allergy, the servant's drowning, and the Garnet Pavilion tensions. Gyokuyou intervenes before the situation worsens. Maomao senses Lishu's fear at the mention of Fengming, who seems gentle and dutiful. Despite resistance from Lishu's attendants, Maomao uses Jinshi's authority to continue her inquiry. With Gaoshun's help, she uncovers records that Ah-Duo bore the emperor's deceased son who was delivered by a doctor later expelled from the palace: Maomao's father.
11	11	"Reducing Two to One"; Transliteration: "Futatsu o Hitotsu ni" (Japanese: 二つを一つに)	Yukihiko Asaki	Yūko Kakihara	Norihiro Naganuma	December 17, 2023	2.4%
Maomao confronts Fengming about the tragedies surrounding Ah-Duo's child and the empress dowager's baby. She learns that Ah-Duo underwent a hysterectomy after the birth because the attending physician, Maomao's father, was called away to assist a higher-ranking royal. Fengming unintentionally killed Ah-Duo's son by feeding him honey, but both incidents led to the doctor's expulsion. Fengming learned the truth when Lishu, who had nearly died from honey as an infant, confided in her. Consumed by guilt and fearing Ah-Duo's discovery, Fengming schemed to drive Lishu away and tried to poison her during the garden party. Her devotion to Ah-Duo became desperate acts of protection. Maomao helps her reconcile these motives, keeping the truth hidden to preserve Ah-Duo's dignity. The emperor orders Ah-Duo's retirement, and Fengming is executed. Maomao deduces that the mid-ranking concubine died by suicide, and encounters Ah-Duo atop the wall; Ah-Duo's cryptic words hint at her son's identity. When Maomao climbs down the wall, she is startled and falls on Jinshi when he asks her what she is doing. Jinshi cries on Maomao's shoulder due to Ah-Duo's upcoming departure and his secrets. The next day, Ah-Duo leaves for the southern palace. Watching her farewell with Lishu, Maomao realizes that the babies may have been switched at birth (explaining her father's banishment and Jinshi's turmoil).
12	12	"The Eunuch and the Courtesan"; Transliteration: "Kangan to Gijo" (Japanese: 宦官と妓女)	Mitsuyo Yokono	Misuzu Chiba	Norihiro Naganuma	December 24, 2023	N/A
After Fengming's execution, her assets are seized and her relatives and associates are punished. Maomao is dismissed in the purge, implicated through Fengming's family's human trafficking ring. Jinshi wonders whether to keep her employed, fearing that forcing her to stay in the palace (which he believes she dislikes) would drive her away. Maomao begs to remain, explaining that she owes the Verdigris madam a large debt and could be sold as a courtesan, but Jinshi refuses. A week later he regrets his decision, realizing that he could have retained her; Gyokuyou's guilt-imposing worsens his remorse. Maomao returns to the Verdigris brothel, working part-time as a courtesan. At a party hosted by a wealthy patron with the "Three Princess" sisters Meimei, Joka, and Pairin, she unexpectedly sees Jinshi. Their interaction attracts the sisters' attention, sparking envy and curiosity. Jinshi decides to buy her freedom, completing the purchase days later. Maomao (unaware of the behind-the-scenes scheming) is puzzled, and Gaoshun and Lihaku may have orchestrated the event to reunite them.
13	13	"Serving in the Outer Court"; Transliteration: "Gaitei Kinmu" (Japanese: 外廷勤務)	Wataru Nakagawa	Yuniko Ayana	Wataru Nakagawa	January 7, 2024	2.4%
Maomao returns to the palace to work in the outer palace; Gaoshun explains that they cannot restore her former position after she was laid off. Jinshi asks her to keep using her freckle make-up. Gaoshun introduces Maomao to Suiren (one of Jinshi's assistants), who shows her around Jinshi's residence; Gaoshun shows her the rest of the outer palace and the public and government offices. Jinshi intends her to become a court lady, but she fails the required exams (despite studying) and becomes Jinshi's personal assistant. Maomao must deal with the jealous court ladies. She longs to be an apothecary again, but her request for simpler quarters and a workplace with access to water and a stove is denied. When she wanders into the military wing for medicinal herbs and is scolded by a court lady with a scent of sandalwood mixed with another, bitter smell, someone mysterious is watching her.
14	14	"The New Pure Consort"; Transliteration: "Atarashii Yoshihi" (Japanese: 新しい淑妃)	Akira Shimizu & Jun Ōwada	Hitomi Ogawa	Wataru Nakagawa	January 14, 2024	2.7%
Maomao, at Gyokuyou's and Lihua's recommendation, is tasked by Jinshi with educating new Pure Consort Loulan on "serving" the emperor. The teaching sessions, attended by the high-ranking concubines, focus on materials from the Old Lady at the Verdigris. While Gyokuyou and Lihua handle the content well, Lishu (and Hongniang) are overwhelmed; Loulan remains nonchalant and snobbish. There is an explosion in a palace building that night, which Lakan investigates. Maomao, wandering near the scene of the incident the following day, investigates and suspects arson. She finds an ivory pipe, and concludes that a smoldering ember from it caused the explosion in the food warehouse when the floating wheat dust ignited. She tells Lihaku (who is investigating the incident) to tell people not to smoke in the food warehouses, but the expensive pipe raises suspicions about the perpetrator's identity.
15	15	"Raw Fish"; Transliteration: "Namasu" (Japanese: 鱠)	Kentarō Fujita	Yūko Kakihara	Kentarō Fujita	January 21, 2024	N/A
Gaoshun enlists Maomao's help in investigating a case involving a bureaucrat who lapses into a coma after consuming raw fugu seasoned with vinegar, similar to an incident ten years earlier. Every detail except one checks out and Gaoshun refers him to a man named Basen, who shows her the kitchen where the food was prepared. Despite interference from the bureaucrat's younger brother, Maomao finds the detail that interested her: the seaweed in the dish, which was imported from the south. She concludes that it was not properly prepared to rid it of poison, causing the bureaucrat's coma. The seaweed's importer is the younger brother, seeking revenge for ill-treatment in their household. Jinshi says that Lakan complained to his office about his appointment of someone connected to the Verdigris as his servant. Lakan mentioned an acquaintance at the Verdigris "who would sell her skills but never herself", an attitude similar to Maomao's attitude towards Jinshi. He seeks Jinshi's help in a matter involving Maomao and her problem-solving skills.
16	16	"Lead"; Transliteration: "Namari" (Japanese: 鉛)	So Toyama	Misuzu Chiba	So Toyama	January 28, 2024	N/A
Jinshi assigns Maomao to investigate the will of a metalworker known to Lakan who died under mysterious circumstances. The will divides his belongings among his three sons; the eldest inherits the workshop, the second a locked chest with an inaccessible central drawer, and the youngest a glass fishbowl and a note urging them to "continue their tea parties as usual". Maomao and Basen examine the shack and chest, and find solder blocking the keyhole of the middle drawer. Using sunlight refracted through the fishbowl, Maomao melts the solder, allowing the second son's key to open it. Inside is another key that unlocks all drawers, revealing tools, trinkets, and a bluish crystal. Initially angered by what seems a prank, the brothers reconcile after the youngest cites their father's wish for unity. They continue their father's business together: the youngest as master craftsman, the eldest managing the accounts, and the second securing clients. Maomao identifies the crystal as the probable cause of the father's death, suspecting solder poisoning, and urges the youngest to consult her father, Luomen. That evening, Jinshi unexpectedly asks Maomao to put makeup on him.
17	17	"A Jaunt Around Town"; Transliteration: "Machiaruki" (Japanese: 街歩き)	Kurabu Kadomatsu	Yuniko Ayana	Kurabu Kadomatsu	February 4, 2024	N/A
Jinshi asks Maomao's help in making him appear less attractive for an incognito stroll through town. Maomao alters his appearance, scent, and voice, dulling his hair and clothing to mask his muscular physique and identity; he is too beautiful to hide his identity with a simple disguise. During their walk, with Basen providing security from a distance, Jinshi (calling himself "Jinka") observes Maomao's silence; they then talk about her adoptive father, Luomen. Maomao says that Luomen studied abroad (suggesting privilege), and was made a eunuch by the previous empress dowager. Jinshi, asking if she knows the regulars at the Verdigris, asks how a courtesan's value decreases. Maomao, bound by confidentiality, hints at the brothel's workings and discloses two ways courtesans lose their value: losing purity halves their worth, and pregnancy reduces it to nothing. Jinshi is shocked.
18	18	"Lakan" (Japanese: 羅漢)	Mayu Tanimoto & Jun Ōwada	Hitomi Ogawa	Mayu Tanimoto & Norihiro Naganuma	February 11, 2024	N/A
Maomao refuses to accompany Jinshi to his destination because she is well-dressed and does not want to blow his cover, and heads home for a few days off. Back home, she awakens from a nightmare which is a memory from infancy. Her adoptive father, Luomen, sends her on an errand to the Verdigris to tend to a woman at its annex. The woman is Maomao's mother, who has syphilis, and Luomen's medicines are the only treatment; the Verdigris was shamed in the past because of this. Luomen appeared out of nowhere when the disease had not caused symptoms, but it worsened because the brothel hesitated to let him treat her. Longtime customer Lakan visits, and Maomao is told to hide in the room while Meimei distracts him. At the palace, Suiren tells Maomao that dinner will be vegetarian and to fetch a bag of potato flour from the inner-palace pharmacy. There she encounters Suirei, the court lady who caught her wandering around the military wing. Maomao wonders why Jinshi is performing purification rituals (part of it is the vegetarian dinner) every time he is assigned to work for long periods and "being a eunuch". Lakan expresses interest in Maomao to Jinshi, causing tension because Lakan is out to get her and gives Jinshi a veiled threat. Jinshi tells Maomao that an official named Lakan will meet her sometime soon, but takes it back when Maomao glares at him. Maomao wanders around the military wing again, gathering medicinal herbs, when Suirei catches her. Suirei says that she planted the medicinal plants for a resurrection medicine, which Maomao desires.
19	19	"Chance or Something More"; Transliteration: "Gūzen ka Hitsuzen ka" (Japanese: 偶然か必然か)	Wataru Nakagawa	Yūko Kakihara	Wataru Nakagawa	February 18, 2024	N/A
Gaoshun tells Jinshi of the afternoon's activities. Lihaku tells Maomao about a tool theft around the time of the warehouse explosion. She learns that the warehouse manager has been poisoned and Master Kounen, who died of salt poisoning, was his predecessor. Maomao senses a connection to the ivory pipe she found at the warehouse. Lihaku says that a court lady, tall with a medicinal odor, gave the pipe to the guard. Maomao remembers her father's advice not to jump to conclusions and shares her findings with Jinshi, who gives her an ox bezoar from the pharmacy. She learns that the poisoning victim is from the Board of Rites, linking it and the ivory pipe to the tool theft. Connecting the tools to Jinshi's purification ceremonies, she rushes to the Altar of the Sapphire Sky for the ceremony. Maomao accuses a guard of being part of the conspiracy before he hits her with a club. Lakan vouches for her: she rushes inside and pushes Jinshi away from a heavy ornament which would have killed him. Wondering what he is doing there, Maomao passes out and Jinshi carries her to his house.
20	20	"Thornapple"; Transliteration: "Mandarage" (Japanese: 曼荼羅華)	Akira Koremoto	Misuzu Chiba	Norihiro Naganuma	February 25, 2024	N/A
Maomao awakens in Jinshi's room, tended by Suiren. She asks her to explain to Basen, Jinshi, and Gaoshun the events linked to the assassination attempt on Jinshi. A ceremonial tool made with a slow-melting lead alloy is tied to the warehouse fire, Kounen's death, the warehouse manager's food poisoning, and the theft of the original ceremonial tools. Maomao learns from Lihaku about Suirei's supposed death by poison, but suspects it was faked with thornapple and pufferfish toxin. Another body is found in Suirei's coffin, confirming that Suirei faked her death. Maomao, impressed and annoyed, wants to learn Suirei's "resurrection drug" recipe. Jinshi, burdened by political tensions and his complicated feelings about Maomao (and her father, Lakan), continues to suppress his age and identity as a man to remain in the palace. Gyokuyou asks Maomao for help with her missed periods, probably due to a new pregnancy. Rumors spread that one of the Three Princesses of the Verdigris has been bought out.
21	21	"How to Buy Out a Contract"; Transliteration: "Miuke Sakusen" (Japanese: 身請け作戦)	Yūshi Ibe	Yuniko Ayana	Masako Sato	March 3, 2024	2.8%
Maomao takes charge of cleaning the rear-palace pharmacy to ensure that it will not be sabotaged after the doctor in charge of the inner-court pharmacy received a pay cut for mismanaging it. The rear-palace doctor says that his family supplies paper to the palace, but since the empress dowager banned logging they can only produce poor-quality paper. The doctor became a eunuch to keep his sister out of the rear palace. Maomao helps him improve the paper quality, which involves the water trough used by oxen for papermaking. Lihaku seeks Maomao's advice about buying out a courtesan: Pairin, Maomao's wet nurse as a baby. Maomao evaluates Lihaku's physique, which causes a misunderstanding with Jinshi when he comes in unexpectedly. Jinshi offers double the price to help him, but Lihaku declines; he disapproves of buying out Pairin's contract with someone else's money, opting for a more-traditional pursuit of her love. Pairin writes to Maomao that she is waiting for her Prince Charming, and Lakan's asking about buying someone out sparked the recent rumors (annoying Maomao).
22	22	"Blue Roses"; Transliteration: "Aoi Soubi" (Japanese: 青い薔薇)	Erkin Kawabata	Hitomi Ogawa	Erkin Kawabata	March 10, 2024	N/A
As Maomao works for the pregnant Gyokuyou and tends to her daughter, Princess Lingli, Lakan wants Jinshi to produce blue roses by the following spring's party. Jinshi asks Maomao for help. Using Lady Lihua's sauna as a greenhouse, she attempts to accelerate the flowering of 100 rosebushes. Tending to the roses includes all-nighters, but she produces them in time for the party to introduce Consort Loulan. Jinshi sees the roses as a chance to stand his ground in front of the emperor, surrounded by tricky, envious rivals, including Lakan and now Shishou, Loulan's father. Maomao tells Jinshi the secret to the multicolored roses (she also produced roses other than blue): letting the blooms suck dyed water. But she is not done yet, as she is up to catching Lakan off-guard. Lakan sees people as Go and Chinese-chess pieces, with most of them pawns. He remembers the red, manicured nails of the courtesan with whom he used to play Go, and is surprised to see Maomao (fingernails painted) with Jinshi and Gaoshun.
23	23	"Balsam and Woodsorrel"; Transliteration: "Hōsenka to Katakumi" (Japanese: 鳳仙花と片喰)	Jun Ōwada	Misuzu Chiba	Kazuya Nomura	March 17, 2024	N/A
Maomao challenges Lakan to a game of Chinese chess; she will live with him if he wins, and he will buy an aging courtesan from the Verdigris if he loses. The loser will drink one of three cups of hard liquor spiked with a drug that turns to poison after three sips. Maomao loses twice in a row but then wins. Lakan, who abstains from alcohol, collapses after drinking the cup. He awakens in the Verdigris attended by Meimei, Fengxian's former attendant, with something bitter Maomao made for him. Lakan remembers a carefree life until his uncle taught him to see people as chess and Go pieces. He met Fengxian, a Verdigris courtesan who was a skilled Go player. They bonded, and she gave herself to him before he was unexpectedly sent abroad to study. During his three-year absence, she wrote him about her planned buyout by another man being canceled (ruining her value). When he returns, he finds two severed, mummified fingers: hers and a baby's and realizes that she had been pregnant by him. Fengxian is gone, thinking he abandoned her.
24	24	"Jinshi and Maomao"; Transliteration: "Jinshi to Maomao" (Japanese: 壬氏と猫猫)	Wataru Nakagawa	Yūko Kakihara	Norihiro Naganuma	March 24, 2024	2.4%
Lakan, bitter about Jinshi's closeness to Maomao and longing for her affection, is summoned by the Old Lady of the Verdigris to choose a courtesan. He initially considers Meimei before hearing a lullaby. Lakan rushes to where Fengxian is, and chooses her despite the cost. Maomao returns from dropping off a hung over Lakan and sees Loulan and her father. She explains that she helped Lakan out of gratitude; Fengxian had chosen not to abort her. Maomao speculates that Lakan may have been manipulated by Fengxian and, when that failed, she sent the severed fingers as a curse. Although she dislikes him, she acknowledges his intelligence and warns Jinshi to not antagonize him. Maomao receives a dress from Meimei for her upcoming wedding. She tries it on atop the rear-palace wall, where Jinshi (alerted by a guard) finds her. She nearly falls off the wall, but he catches her. They share a rare intimate moment, ending with Maomao asking for the ox bezoar he owes her. Days later, Jinshi visits the Jade Pavilion with a new case for her.

=== Season 2 (2025) ===
No. overall	No. in season	Title	Directed by	Written by	Storyboarded by	Original release date	Viewership rating
25	1	"Maomao and Maomao"; Transliteration: "Maomao to Maomao" (Japanese: 猫猫と毛毛)	Jun Ōwada	Yūko Kakihara	Akinori Fudesaka	January 10, 2025	4.8%
Jinshi notices Loulan's unusually large number of ladies-in-waiting, casting a poor light on the other concubines. At the clinic, Maomao distills scented oils and alcohol for disinfecting away from the Jade Pavilion to protect the pregnant Gyokuyou. She receives books from the madam of the Verdigris to educate ladies-in-waiting, which Jinshi allows but Gaoshun censors. A novel is shared by the servants, prompting Maomao to encourage Ailan to make copies and promote literacy. Xiaolan is inspired to learn reading and writing for the future. During a walk, Princess Lingli finds a kitten; Maomao unsuccessfully tries to catch it, and it is caught by an unfamiliar servant girl. Maomao cares for the cat; the emperor lets the princess keep it, giving it the title of "Admonisher of Thieves" (mouser at the clinic stores); despite Maomao's annoyance, it is named after her. She hears about an incoming caravan.
26	2	"Caravan"; Transliteration: "Taishō" (Japanese: 隊商)	Mayu Tanimoto & Akira Koremoto	Misuzu Chiba	Mayu Tanimoto & Akira Koremoto	January 17, 2025	4.0%
The palace prepares for the arrival of a diplomatic delegation which is part of a trading caravan. Gyokuyou is to receive three new ladies-in-waiting to offset Loulan's large staff during her pregnancy. Maomao warns Gyokuyou that some loose dresses could reveal her pregnancy, and reflects on the palace's odd lack of amenities despite its excellent sanitation. Maomao and Xiaolan encounter Shisui, the servant girl who caught her cat, while shopping on the caravan's last day (when discounts abound). Over tea at the medical office, Shisui mentions a strange smell from the north (possibly a clogged waterway) and her fascination with insects; Maomao is intrigued. After the caravan leaves, scented oils and perfumes become a court trend. Maomao discovers that several popular fragrances could harm pregnancies like Gyokuyou's and, possibly, Lihua's; she links the scents to past poisonings involving lead-based powders. Jinshi alerts the concubines, and Gyokuyou orders inspections. Concern grows amid news of a concubine's death by suspected poisoning, fueling fears of a wider conspiracy; the fugitive Suirei is still unaccounted-for.
27	3	"Corpse Fungus"; Transliteration: "Tōjinkasō" (Japanese: 冬人夏草)	Wataru Nakagawa	Hitomi Ogawa	Wataru Nakagawa	January 24, 2025	3.5%
Jinshi investigates Jin's death and Maomao hears about Tao, a palace woman who disappeared. Jinshi asks Maomao to remove poisonous mushrooms from the northern forest, and she detects the odor mentioned by Shisui. Maomao learns that Jin abused lower-ranked women and was suspected of trying to poison Gyokuyou during her pregnancy. Son, a disgraced concubine, interrupts the funeral and accuses Jin of ruining her. She has symptoms of poisoning, and Jin's ladies-in-waiting have rashes. Maomao links the symptoms to a toxic fungus from the forest. Two years earlier, Son had a mysterious illness. Jin later had symptoms, and was thought to have died by suicide with the same poison. Maomao says that someone applied the toxin to Jin's skin. With Jinshi's eunuchs, she finds a decomposed body buried in the forest. It is Jin, identified by her ornaments. Maomao says that Jin's coffin holds Tao, the missing palace woman; Jin died during a violent, jealousy-driven altercation with Tao. Jin's ladies-in-waiting helped Tao impersonate Jin, fooling Jinshi during his rare visits. When Tao's arranged marriage was imminent the deception became unsustainable, and the maids killed her. Jinshi confiscates Maomao's corpse-fungus hoard to keep her from experimenting on herself.
28	4	"Mirror"; Transliteration: "Kagami" (Japanese: 鏡)	Tsuyoshi Nakano	Yūko Kakihara	Minoru Ōhara	January 31, 2025	4.2%
Maomao inspects a mirror given to a high concubine by the foreign envoy. Gaoshun brings her a strange case: identical-twin daughters of a wealthy man, kept under close surveillance. Despite her confinement, the younger twin becomes pregnant. After examining the room's floor plan, Maomao deduces that the older twin used mirrors and embroidery to create an illusion and allow the younger to sneak out. Maomao thinks that the pregnancy conceals a deeper secret. Jinshi learns that the envoy is searching for a woman of "otherworldly beauty who sheds pearls as tears". Maomao recognizes the description; the woman is the madam at Verdigris. The madam confirms the story, and shows a painting commissioned by the original envoy. The challenge is finding a woman with the same ethereal beauty to impress both envoys. The finest beauties are rejected, making the female envoys' request a diplomatic issue due to their control of vital trade routes. Maomao begins considering Jinshi a potential candidate, but wonders why the envoys believe that this courtesan was a "moon fairy".
29	5	"The Moon Fairy"; Transliteration: "Gessei" (Japanese: 月精)	Shintaro Itoga	Misuzu Chiba	Erkin Kawabata	February 7, 2025	4.2%
Maomao sees Shisui, who is collecting caterpillars which become moths with a sparkling, otherworldly effect in moonlight. Maomao sees the two envoys at a banquet. When they leave, they see a figure dancing under the moon and surrounded by glowing lights. Maomao explains the illusion: the lights are male moths, attracted by a scent. The dancer is Jinshi, whose identity was concealed. Maomao wonders who conspired to introduce the scented oils which could have endangered Gyokuyou and Lihua's pregnancies. Jinshi thinks that the envoys might have been involved, since they hoped to become concubines. Maomao believes that Gyokuyou is the primary target, suspecting Jin of trying to poison her during her pregnancy with Lingli and theorizing that Suirei taught Jin about poisons. She discovers a clinic, separate from the doctor's office, where ladies-in-waiting recuperate. It is staffed by older women, and she is impressed with their professionalism and use of modern practices. When Maomao sees Jinshi outside the clinic, she suggests the same practices at the doctor's office. Only men can become doctors, and only doctors can make medicines. A supervisor at the clinic may have learned about Maomao when Ailan, who has a cold, takes medicine Maomao gave her.
30	6	"The Crystal Pavilion, For the Third Time"; Transliteration: "Mi Tabi, Suishōgū" (Japanese: みたび、水晶宮)	Yukihiko Asaki	Hitomi Ogawa	Yukihiko Asaki	February 14, 2025	3.7%
Clinic supervisor Shenlü asks Maomao for help with a sick servant from Wise Consort Lihua's pavilion who has signs of tuberculosis and has been absent for two weeks. They find the missing servant locked in a shed, severely ill. Shin, Lihua's head lady-in-waiting, says that she quarantined her to prevent her illness from spreading. Shin had been stockpiling banned trade goods, including scented oils that could be mixed into an abortion-inducing drug. Confronted by Jinshi and Lihua, Shin says she resented her cousin Lihua for being chosen as a concubine over her. Maomao notes Shin's fixation on being empress, rather than love for the emperor. Lihua slaps Shin for speaking against her, fires her and bans her from the pavilion. Jinshi asks Maomao how she found the missing servant; she noticed shrubs near the shed with white flowers whose seeds can be made into an abortion-inducing drug. Maomao says that someone in the rear palace is spreading knowledge of the abortifacient properties of the scented oils, suggesting a larger conspiracy. The emperor later hears that Maomao again saved Lihua.
31	7	"The Shrine of Choosing"; Transliteration: "Sentaku no Byō" (Japanese: 選択の廟)	Wazuka Komamiya	Yūko Kakihara	Wazuka Komamiya	February 21, 2025	4.1%
Jinshi dreams of his childhood, remembering an old man taken away by an angry old woman (later identified as his father and grandmother). Maomao hears about the nation's founding myth of Mother Royal, a foreigner. The Shrine of Choosing selected emperors with a test, but was abandoned. Luomen visited the shrine and became acquainted with the eunuch caretaker. The emperor brings Jinshi and Maomao to the shrine to attempt the test. Through colored doors, they reach the final stage and fail. The eunuch says that Luomen would have uncovered the shrine's secret, and Maomao asks the emperor about the previous emperors' eyesight (only the previous emperor had good eyesight) and the previous emperor's parents. Jinshi takes the test, guided by Maomao, who brings them to an upper-floor balcony. Maomao deduces that the shrine screened for color blindness, a rare trait in the country but common in the lands where the Mother Royal originated. The emperor jokes about taking Maomao as a concubine, but finds her breasts too small. Maomao continues to wonder about Jinshi, no longer seeing him as "just the emperor's favorite eunuch".
32	8	"The Empress Dowager"; Transliteration: "Kōtaigō" (Japanese: 皇太后)	Jun Ōwada	Misuzu Chiba	Minoru Ōhara	February 28, 2025	3.8%
Maomao is "banished" to the storage shed, but is free to make medicines. Maomao finds Shisui catching bell crickets, but their encounter is interrupted by Empress Dowager Anshi, who helped create the clinic and banned slavery and the making of eunuchs. Anshi, who heard about Maomao from her former lady-in-waiting Suiren, asks her to find out if she cursed the late emperor (who favoured young concubines). Anshi birthed the current emperor by Caesarean section, with Luomen's help. Maomao starts questioning the parentage of the emperor's brother, given Anshi's age at his conception. Anshi hosts a tea party with high-ranking consorts. Hongniang warns Maomao not to embarrass Gyokuyou, knowing that Anshi intends to speak with her. One of Anshi's attendants brings Maomao to the late emperor's residence, where he and his mother (the former empress dowager) died. The attendant says that the emperor's body did not decay after a year in the mausoleum, fueling Anshi's belief that she cursed him. With the building set for demolition, Maomao agrees to investigate on one condition.
33	9	"The Late Emperor"; Transliteration: "Sentei" (Japanese: 先帝)	Akira Koremoto	Hitomi Ogawa	Wataru Nakagawa	March 7, 2025	3.8%
Maomao enters the late emperor's room and finds a poisonous pebble in a box of Jinshi's toys, leading her to suspect why the late emperor's body did not decompose. Inspecting the room with Jinshi, she detects a peculiar odor and asks if the former emperor painted. Maomao peels off some wallpaper, revealing a painting made with an arsenic-based mineral (explaining the emperor's preservation). His painting was kept secret; the room and supplies were a gift from his late mother to protect him after he unexpectedly became emperor. Anshi remembers that she was a lady-in-waiting to her older half-sister, whom the emperor rejected (favoring her). They had a son, but the emperor forgot about her. Anshi treasured a painting he made of her, but told Suiren to discard it. Jinshi, having seen the painting, remembers the emperor dropping an orpiment pebble during a visit to him. The color in the painting was one Anshi used to wear, making Jinshi wonder if it was his mother's painting on the wall. Before Anshi leaves, she warns Jinshi to keep his favorites (particularly a girl he is partial to) hidden before someone takes them away.
34	10	"A Ghost Story"; Transliteration: "Kaidan" (Japanese: 怪談)	Oh Jin Koo	Yūko Kakihara	Yūichi Nihei	March 14, 2025	3.8%
Gyokuyou introduces Maomao to her new ladies-in-waiting. When she allows her to use the shed, Yinghua invites Maomao to a gathering where court ladies tell ghost stories. One story is about a boy and his mother who were ostracized after entering a forbidden forest for food. By the thirteenth story, Maomao is dizzy from the fireplace fumes. She opens a window, telling Yinghua and Shisui to awaken the other eight. Maomao speculates on the "forbidden forest" to Shisui, suggesting that it may relate to someone dying after eating something from it. The mother and child may have entered the forest hungry, picking up poisonous mushrooms. Villagers find the boy dead and the mother saying that "there are good things to eat in the forest". Yinghua learns from Hongniang that the old organizer, who had relations with the old emperor and found those gatherings her only fun, died a year ago. Whether it is the organizer's own experience or an elaborate ghost prank, Maomao cannot fathom. Either way, a frightened Yinghua sleeps with Maomao that night.
35	11	"The Hunt"; Transliteration: "Kari" (Japanese: 狩り)	Shintaro Itoga	Misuzu Chiba	Naohito Takahashi	March 21, 2025	3.5%
Jinshi plans to reveal his status to Maomao during a hunting trip in the north. He asks Gyokuyou to "return" Maomao, and she teases him for calling her "that girl". Maomao learns that Jinshi's family has been served by the Ma Clan (to which Gaoshun and Basen belong) and Basen, Jinshi's temporary assistant, is instructed to keep his identity secret. Maomao checks his food for poison, but Jinshi refuses to eat over their aphrodisiac effects. At the banquet after the hunt, the heat overwhelms Jinshi; he leaves the table, and Maomao follows him. She leads him to a nearby waterfall, intending to treat his apparent dehydration. Before he reveals his secret, assassins try to shoot him with a feifa gun and they jump from the waterfall. In a cave behind the waterfall, Jinshi performs CPR to revive Maomao. To avoid a chill she strips down to her underwear, creating an awkward situation for him. She gives him herbs for dehydration as he explains that at least two assassins are after him. While leaving the cave, Maomao accidentally falls on Jinshi. She tries to get off him, but he holds her.
36	12	"Ka Zuigetsu" (Japanese: 華瑞月)	Masahiro Matsunaga	Hitomi Ogawa	Wataru Nakagawa	March 28, 2025	3.3%
A search party is sent two hours after Jinshi's disappearance. Maomao, in a compromising position with Jinshi, accidentally touches his genitals. Jinshi, irritated, puts her under him and almost kisses her; Lihaku's barking dog interrupts them. Maomao offers to determine who was responsible for the assassination attempt. Lihaku brings bloodstained fabric to Basen, who organizes another search party. In the forest, one of the assassins panics while digging in a clearing and is surprised by Maomao; Lihaku apprehends him. They tracked the shooter with Lihaku's dog and the scent of gunpowder. Basen updates Jinshi on the assassins' associates. Gaoshun socializes with officials who believe his cover story about becoming a eunuch. Concerns about the emperor's younger brother's suitability for the throne arise. Maomao suspects the involvement of foreign envoys, and wonders why she is slow to understand other people's feelings. When Jinshi visits Maomao to apologize, he tries to reveal his secret but she is distracted by the ox bezoars he gives her. Only two people have the character "Ka" in their name: the emperor and Jinshi (also known as Ka Zuigetsu, his brother). Gaoshun hopes Maomao learns that secret.
37	13	"The Baths"; Transliteration: "Yudono" (Japanese: 湯殿)	Mayu Tanimoto	Yūko Kakihara	Erkin Kawabata	April 4, 2025	4.7%
Xiaolan's term ends in six months, and she considers a job outside the palace. Maomao thinks of the Verdigris, but prefers a better opportunity. Shisui suggests frequenting the rear-palace baths as attendants to network with concubines and court ladies they rarely see. She learned this from a retired court lady who found work through a concubine's household. Gyokuyou supports Maomao's plan to help Xiaolan, seeing it as a chance to hear palace gossip. Rumors spread about Gyokuyou, Lihua, and Loulan's pregnancies, which Maomao notes with caution and interest. Thirty new eunuchs, formerly foreign slaves, are reportedly assigned to the palace baths, which reminds Maomao of the cave incident with Jinshi. As Maomao spends more time with Shisui and Xiaolan, Haku-u questions her presence in the Jade Pavilion and why Gyokuyou (usually guarded) trusts her. Haku-u warns her to speak carefully in public. Maomao advises the shy, lonely Seki-u to visit the baths and join them in their massage sessions. She sees Lishu frequenting the baths with Kanan, her head lady-in-waiting, which might disturb other bathers. Over juice, Kanan says that she avoids her own pavilion's baths because of a ghost.
38	14	"The Dancing Ghost"; Transliteration: "Odoru Yūrei" (Japanese: 踊る幽霊)	Jun Ōwada & Kaho Asai	Misuzu Chiba	Jun Ōwada	April 11, 2025	4.9%
Maomao, Jinshi and Gaoshun investigate a ghost-sighting at Lishu's pavilion. They notice the dismissive, disdainful attitude of Lishu's ladies-in-waiting, especially the former head lady-in-waiting (who belittles Lishu's fears and insults Kanan, her new head lady-in-waiting and former food taster). When Jinshi dismisses the attendants, Lishu says that they make her bathwater too hot and she must wait for it to cool. During her bath, she sees what seems to be a ghostly-white face laughing through the curtains; the apparition disappears when Kanan approaches. Maomao inspects the bathhouse and discovers the cause. The "ghost" is an optical illusion when steam from the hot water moves the curtains; the "face" is the reflection from a bronze mirror (an heirloom of Lishu's late mother) of the moonlight. Lishu thinks her mother is haunting her because she no longer uses the mirror. When the attendants return, the former head lady tries to grab the mirror but Lishu defends it. Jinshi scolds the former head lady-in-waiting and confiscates her (unauthorized) high-ranking hairpin. As Maomao learns more about eunuch admissions, Gaoshun warns Jinshi to act before Lakan complicates things. Xiaolan faces a crisis.
39	15	"Ice"; Transliteration: "Aisu" (Japanese: 氷菓(アイス))	Misu Yamaneko	Hitomi Ogawa	Mayu Tanimoto & Akira Koremoto	April 18, 2025	4.7%
Xiaolan bumps into a eunuch, causing him to drop and break a block of ice meant for high-ranking concubine Loulan. Since ice is rare, the situation is serious; Maomao promises to repurpose the ice. She sees Jinshi, and asks him for access to a kitchen and ingredients. Jinshi agrees if Maomao wears the hairpin he gave her; if she does, he'll share the secret with her. With help from Jinshi and Xiaolan, Maomao prepares ice cream for Loulan. Jinshi is convinced after tasting it and Maomao is confident of her work, thanks to Jinshi sharing Loulan's tastes. Shisui joins in sharing the treat. Gyokuyou later notices abnormal fetal movement. Maomao suspects a breech birth, and confirms it by examination. The safest option would be a risky caesarean section; Maomao suggests Luomen, her exiled "criminal" adopted father (from whom she learned her apothecary skills) as the best person. Despite hesitation by Hongniang and familiarity with the past political history of the rear palace, Gyokuyou agrees. Luomen arrives two days later to help, and works at the doctor's clinic.
40	16	"Festering Resentment"; Transliteration: "Suku'u Akui" (Japanese: 巣食う悪意)	Tsuyoshi Nakano	Yūko Kakihara	Yūichi Nihei	April 25, 2025	4.0%
While preparing moxibustion for Gyokuyou, Maomao learns that Luomen has joined the doctor's office for Gyokuyou's upcoming delivery. She writes plain-language warnings about rear-palace dangers such as lead makeup and strong scents for the vocational school, allowing mass distribution. As the schoolmaster mentions the new eunuchs being relocated to avoid distracting servants who were flocking to see them working at the baths, Maomao realizes that older staff are victims of the former emperor who learned about dangerous substances from Luomen's past notices. She suspects that Shenlü is using patients to pass abortifacient knowledge to Shin (including the caravan scents), but lacks proof. Maomao finds a book, once owned by Shisui, questioning her servant status. Suirei (posing as a eunuch) confronts Maomao, threatens Shisui, and tries to lure her away with the resurrection formula. Maomao notices damage to Suirei's hand, probably from the drug. Lakan meets with Shishou and the crown prince (Ah-Duo in disguise) and says that feifas used in an assassination attempt probably came from Shishou's territory. Ah-Duo and Basen discuss Maomao's disappearance, which distracts Jinshi.
41	17	"Fox Village"; Transliteration: "Kitsune no Sato" (Japanese: 狐の里)	Shintaro Itoga	Misuzu Chiba	Naotaka Hayashi	May 2, 2025	4.9%
Jinshi looks for Maomao. Guen's memory of Maomao the cat's behavior allows Luomen to find a hastily-written, hidden message from Maomao with characters for "shrine" and an unclear one. At the Jade Pavilion, the ladies-in-waiting say that the character might be "jade"; Seki-u wonders if it might refer to Shisui, whose name shares its pronunciation. Jinshi remembers that Suirei's name was written with that character. Suirei brings Maomao and Shisui by boat to a remote hot-spring village, where Maomao sees one of the foreign envoys. When Maomao exposes Shisui after she protects Suirei from a snake, she learns that they are sisters and deduces how they had contacted each other in the rear palace. Suirei says that she knows Lakan is her father, and Maomao believes she was taken as leverage against him. Investigation of the shrine near where Maomao's message was discovered reveals that Maomao was taken through an old, abandoned waterway. Jinshi receives a report of a missing eunuch and that no maid named "Shisui" exists in the rear-palace records. Gyokuyou goes into labor.
42	18	"Lantern Plant"; Transliteration: "Hoozuki" (Japanese: 鬼灯)	Erkin Kawabata	Hitomi Ogawa	Naohito Takahashi	May 9, 2025	4.6%
Gyokuyou's labor proceeds safely, thanks to Maomao's breech-birth treatment. Jinshi investigates the missing eunuch, Tian, who had infiltrated the palace and frequently visited a graveyard for virgins deflowered by the late emperor. He confronts Shenlü, who deduces Jinshi's identity by his resemblance to the young former emperor and attempts suicide. Disturbed by hints about his true parentage, Jinshi learns that one grave belonged to Taihou, a lady-in-waiting whose daughter was exiled with a doctor who was the alleged father. At the Garnet Pavilion, he uncovers Loulan's use of body doubles and identifies Renpu in her seat. Gaoshun reports Shishou's disappearance, suspecting their involvement in a larger scheme. Lahan, Lakan's heir, reveals embezzlement and illicit iron trade tied to the palace conspiracy and offers to investigate further in exchange for leniency about the damage Lakan did to the palace gates.
43	19	"Festival"; Transliteration: "Matsuri" (Japanese: 祭り)	Mayu Tanimoto	Yūko Kakihara	Mayu Tanimoto	May 23, 2025	3.8%
Shisui brings Maomao to the harvest festival and is interested in her hairpin from Jinshi, which Maomao keeps. Shisui explains the village's history about western settlers and the symbolism of the fox masks' red-and-green paint, linked to color blindness. Maomao deduces that the settlers are from the same group as the Mother Royal. The festival ends with a ritual burning of last year's masks, said to grant wishes if fully burned. After the festival, Maomao demands Suirei's resurrection-medicine recipe. Suirei shares it and her theories about refining it, such as not using thornapple (probably added to prolong unconsciousness for enslavement, with memory loss a side effect). Maomao offers herself as a test subject, but Suirei refuses. When Suirei leaves, Maomao studies the formula (cared for by Shisui, whose hairdressing and massaging skills stem from harsh training by her mother). Maomao later notices an unharvested patch of rice by a storehouse. Kyou-u sneaks her out to the storehouse, and picks the lock. Maomao finds Suirei's lab and a feifa-assembly workshop. She and Kyou-u are caught by Shenmei and envoy Ayla.
44	20	"The Stronghold"; Transliteration: "Toride" (Japanese: 砦)	Akira Koremoto & Yū Kinome	Misuzu Chiba	Wataru Nakagawa	May 31, 2025 (Note: Episode 44 aired at 12:05 a.m. JST, 1 hour and 5 minutes after the original air time on Nippon TV)	3.6%
Shenmei punishes Suirei for Maomao and Kyou-u's presence in the storehouse. Loulan (Shisui's real identity) intervenes on their behalf, convincing her mother to take Maomao as an apothecary to develop an immortality drug. At the Shi stronghold, Maomao learns more about their family history: how Shenmei ousted Suirei and her mother, reducing them to servants and removing her original name – Shisui, her half-sister Loulan's pseudonym. Maomao believes their attempts on Jinshi's life are retaliation for his rear-palace reforms. Pushing aside thoughts about Jinshi's royal identity, she realizes that the Shi clan is preparing for war. Loulan remembers her wasted efforts to soften her mother. Lahan reports the results of his investigation to Jinshi: unreported expansion in the Shi stronghold, evidence of rebellion. Lakan storms in, criticizing Jinshi's inaction, but Luomen controls his temper. Lakan addresses Jinshi as a royal, asking him to mobilize the Forbidden Army against the Shi rebellion.
45	21	"Taibon" (Note: Episode 45's title would ordinarily translate as "Hikibon" (蟇盆; lit. 'Frog Festival'). However, being taken directly from the original light novel series' rendition, it translates as "Taibon" (蠆盆; lit. 'The Pit'), an outdated method of both physical and psychological torture invented by an ancient Chinese king. In reality, the kanji character "蟇" is not normally romanized as "Tai" in Japanese.) (Japanese: 蟇盆)	Takanori Yano	Hitomi Ogawa	Yūichi Nihei	June 6, 2025	4.2%
Maomao learns that the resurrection drug was a side result of the immortality research, proven effective by Suirei. Shenmei, obsessed with regaining youth, demands a potion. Kyou-u attempts to help her escape, smuggling her a wire, but is caught. Suirei defends him, angering Shenmei. To redirect punishment Maomao insults Shenmei, claiming responsibility for Kyou-u's actions, and is sent to the "taibon": a pit of venomous creatures, one of whom she kills and eats. A guard, bribed by Suirei and Kyou-u, reveals the stronghold's gunpowder production and an approaching army. Maomao discovers the basement gunpowder factory and sees Loulan evacuating the workers before destroying it. Loulan explains Suirei's background as the previous emperor's illegitimate granddaughter and her own experience as her mother's "doll". Maomao confirms that Shisui was taking abortifacients. Loulan leads Maomao to her room, where she reveals the poisoned Shi children (including Kyou-u) to spare them punishment when the Shi clan loses. The stronghold rumbles from explosions.
46	22	"Royal Guard"; Transliteration: "Kin-gun" (Japanese: 禁軍)	Masahiro Matsunaga	Yūko Kakihara	Naohito Takahashi	June 13, 2025	4.1%
Shisui made Maomao the apothecary to protect her, never intending her to meet Shenmei. She took abortion drugs to avoid becoming like Shenmei, and distanced Suirei from the clan to protect her. Maomao realizes Shisui's futile plan, but cannot stop her. She gives her Jinshi's hairpin, asking her to return it someday. At camp, Lakan proposes triggering an avalanche to disable the Shi armory. Jinshi agrees, despite the dishonor. Shenmei continues her cruelty, and Shishou remembers being ordered to marry the former emperor's illegitimate daughter (Suirei's mother) in exchange for a favor. After the gunpowder factory explodes, Loulan (rescuing Suirei) takes responsibility and urges her father to do the same. As the royal guard attacks, Jinshi insists on rescuing "Grand Commandant Kan's daughter" to avoid political backlash. He finds Maomao, who asks for his protection. She realizes he is the Crown Prince, but he says that he is no longer because Gyokuyou gave birth to the new heir. Jinshi leaves her with Lihaku, who asks soldiers to take the children out. As Maomao leaves, she vows to fulfill Shisui's last wish.
47	23	"The Shi Clan"; Transliteration: "Shi no Ichizoku" (Japanese: 子の一族)	Wataru Nakagawa & Akinori Fudesaka	Misuzu Chiba	Wataru Nakagawa & Akinori Fudesaka	June 27, 2025	4.7%
Jinshi confronts Shishou during the royal guard's invasion of the Shi stronghold, claiming responsibility for the assassination attempt. Shishou is stabbed to death by the royal guard, dying with memories of a young Shenmei. Loulan leads Jinshi to Shenmei and Suirei, revealing that while summoned as a concubine, Shenmei was a hostage held over the Shi clan to cripple their slave-trading business and make them expand the rear palace. Shishou gave up his future to save her, marrying the emperor's illegitimate daughter (Suirei's mother) as part of an agreement with the previous emperor. Suirei (the real Shisui) was secretly recognized as imperial blood. Despite Shishou's devotion, Shenmei's resentment deepened. When Shenmei tries to shoot Loulan, the sabotaged feifa kills her instead. Loulan asks Jinshi to spare clansmen exiled by her mother, and scars his face as token revenge for her and to ensure immediate execution. She performs a final, defiant dance and is gunned down by Basen and his soldiers as Suirei watches in grief, too late to save her. Jinshi later finds Maomao resting beside the poisoned children, fulfilling her final request.
48	24	"The Beginning"; Transliteration: "Hajimari" (Japanese: はじまり)	Jun Ōwada & Kaho Asai	Hitomi Ogawa	Akinori Fudesaka	July 4, 2025	4.0%
Maomao awakens next to Jinshi. She rebandages his scar and calls it manly, acknowledging that others had reduced him to his beauty. Before they can kiss, the Shi children stir and Maomao asks Suirei's help; Jinshi realizes the covert meaning of Loulan's final request. At the New Year, Gyokuyou is named empress and the new crown prince is revealed. Luomen remains in the rear palace. Maomao returns to the pleasure district and cares for Kyou-u (renamed Chou-u), whose extended death state caused memory loss. The other children are adopted by Ah-Duo; Suirei is spared because of her imperial blood, but is kept under surveillance. Seki-u brings letters from Xiaolan (now employed by a concubine's sister), who tells Maomao that she misses her and Shisui; Maomao is moved to tears. Shisui's body remains missing, with search efforts resuming in spring when the snows melt. Jinshi visits Maomao, asking about the hairpin she gave to Loulan. He attempts to resume their army-camp moment, but is interrupted by Chou-u and settles for napping on her lap. In a port city, Shisui (now called Tamamo) trades Maomao's bullet-damaged hairpin for a jade cicada ornament and prepares to go overseas.

=== Season 3 (2026–27) ===
No. overall	No. in season	Title	Directed by	Written by	Storyboarded by	Original release date	Viewership rating
Part 1
49	1	"Locusts"; Transliteration: "Inago" (Japanese: 蝗(いなご))	Jun Ōwada	Yūko Kakihara	Akinori Fudesaka	October 2, 2026	4.8%
Concerns about a possible locust plague and bad harvest weight on Jinshi following Loulan's warning, as the population might interpret it as divine retribution for the destruction of the Shi Clan and revolt against the emperor. His identity already revealed, Jinshi takes part in court and witnesses its rivalries during Gyokuyou's announcement as Empress. In the month since Maomao's return to the Verdigris, the effects of bad harvests are felt as they have to have a locust breakfast. During an errand, Chou-u further comments on bad harvests, drawing Maomao's attention. Initially against getting involved, she becomes intrigued when she finds a book from the Shi Clan's stronghold on sale at a local bookstore. Through Lihaku's help, she tracks down the seller--the guard who freed her from the snake pit. He also took a volume on insects, having taken an interest while delivering food to its author, the previous apothecary, who also researched ways to prevent locust plagues. His comments on the likelihood of a famine convince Maomao to inform Jinshi, aware of the importance of the Shi Clan's research.
50	2	"The Fire-Rat Cloak"; Transliteration: "Hinezumi no Kawagoromo" (Japanese: 火鼠の皮衣)	Yū Kinome	Misuzu Chiba	Yū Kinome	October 9, 2026	3.6%
Jinshi ignores publications attacking Loulan and receives a message from Maomao. While shopping with Chou-u, Maomao discovers a foreign style robe embroidered with disguised foreign script, and through the tale the seller associates with it, determines it to be made of fire-resistant stone fibers. Connecting the tale with the skills and knowledge necessary to make the robe, the unrest in the western region, and the foreign envoys who associated with the Shi Clan, she speculates the maiden in the story might have been a spy. Jinshi visits Maomao at the Verdigris, where they discuss the likelihood of an upcoming plague. She believes another insect volume of the notes by the Shi Clan's previous apothecary might have important information about combating it, so Jinshi orders Gaoshun to retrieve from the fortress. Noticing Jinshi's fatigue, Maomao has him rest at the Verdigris, and at his request, she sings him a lullaby.
51	3	"Let Them Eat Cake"; Transliteration: "Pan ga Nakereba" (Japanese: 麺麭がなければ)	Susumu Nakagawa	Hitomi Ogawa	Susumu Nakagawa	October 16, 2026	3.6%
A villager summons Maomao to treat his malnourished daughter, who displays dilated pupils and discolored fingers. She discovers the girl ate an unusual sweet containing an abortifacient ingredient, which also caused the girl's pregnant mother to die due to miscarriage. Ukyou discovers that the family's neighbor lost his fingers after having the same sweet, learning he got it from a mysterious woman. Maomao takes the girl home for rehabilitation with Chou-u's help. The girl's older sister, tired of their abusive gambling-addicted father, wants to become a courtesan to raise her sister. Maomao agrees to introduce them to the Verdigris house. Their father fails to reclaim them. Jinshi receives reports from the Mi clan of spies about suspicious drugs circulating in the streets, with a "White Lady" being a common figure among the cases. They must, however, catch the culprits in the act due to lack of evidence. Basen delivers the recovered insect volume Maomao requested, but there is no locust information on them. She thinks Sazen deceived her, but he points out that there is a missing third volume, which he speculates might have been buried with the apothecary author, his assistant having handled his burial. Maomao seeks out Suirei, who now lives with Ah-Duo under the name "Rei", for answers.
52	4	"The Last Volume"; Transliteration: "Saishū Maki" (Japanese: 最終巻)	Shigeru Yamazaki	Yūko Kakihara	Yoshimasa Hiraike	October 23, 2026	3.5%
At Ah-Duo's villa, Suirei confirms that Maomao is missing one encyclopedia volume, and reveals her teacher faked his death and rendered amnesiac with the resurrection medicine, and was hidden from Shenmei at the hot spring village. Convinced of Shisui's smarts, Ah-Duo suggests she left contingencies, leading Maomao to realize the missing insect volume is the book Shisui left at Shenlu's clinic. Jinshi retrieves it from the confiscated clinic contents and hands it to Maomao. The book details distinguishing traits of plague locusts, suggests limiting their numbers by eliminating their larvae and using bonfires to deal with adults, and lists an insecticide recipe. A small plague is considered a precursor to a larger plague. The situation may have deteriorated over the Shi clan's violation of the Empress Regnant's logging bans after the death of the previous emperor, dwindling predator bird populations. Maomao suggests banning sparrow hunting and promoting grasshopper dishes. The three Verdigris princesses discuss a "white sorceress" whose performances of mind-reading, creating gold, and claims of immortality are drawing enough audience to cut into Verdigris' earnings. Maomao, believing it is a scam, thinks it is an immediate concern for Jinshi, as many in the sorceress' audience are government officials.
53	5	"The White-Snake Immortal"; Transliteration: "Hakuja Sen'nyo" (Japanese: 白蛇仙女)	Akira Koremoto & Mami Miyazaki	Misuzu Chiba	Erkin Kawabata	October 30, 2026	4.1%
Lahan invites Maomao to investigate the rumored White Lady, an albino performer who can supposedly perform supernatural feats. During the show, Maomao witnesses her guessing hidden numbers, transforming copper into gold, and performing other seemingly magical tricks. She later exposes the tricks as clever uses of heat-sensitive plating, salt-treated ink, sound, vapor, lighting, and audience distractions, which includes the slightly-salty drinks served before the performance. However, Maomao says the liquid the White Lady drinks during the performance is mercury, a poison. Days later, the White Lady's Show mysteriously disappears, leaving behind reports of mercury poisoning among merchants in the city. With all that, Maomao wonders what is the White Lady aiming to accomplish.
54	6	"The Paper Village"; Transliteration: "Kami no Mura" (Japanese: 紙の村)	Kaho Asai	Hitomi Ogawa	Jun Ōwada & Kaho Asai	November 6, 2026	3.5%
While preparing to accompany Jinshi on a trip, Maomao discovers Sazen's knowledge of herbal medicines, and trains him to work as an apothecary in her absence. Guen, who has been granted a vacation on the condition that he brings someone of high rank along, meets her at the Verdigris House, where Jinshi and Basen, waiting in disguise, meet them. The group travels to Guen's hometown, where his family seeks their help in resolving a land dispute with a hostile landlord's son, who demands the equivalent of five annual payments at once. Unable to do so because of increased grain taxes caused by the locust crisis, they hope to secure a tax cut. As Maomao suspects their reduced paper tax is intended to encourage literacy, Basen agrees to observe the negotiations the following day.
55	7	"The Bet"; Transliteration: "Kake" (Japanese: 賭け)	Hirokazu Sakamoto	Yūko Kakihara	Susumu Nakagawa	November 13, 2026	TBD
Jinshi visits Maomao in her room to discuss the region's rice harvest and his plans to protect the papermaking industry, while also asking her to replicate his scar disguise. During the meeting with the landlord, Maomao discovers that he intends to exploit an allegedly invalid contract to seize Guen's family's papermaking business. She challenges him to a drinking contest and, after winning, exposes his slandering about the papermaking industry in the village, and suspected tax evasion involving rice production and liquor sales. The landlord's daughter eventually intervenes, revealing that her father's hostility toward outsiders stems from Guen's family's eldest son's love for her. In the end, Guen's family secures a five-year repayment arrangement, while Maomao claims a decade's worth of rice deliveries to the Verdigris House as her winnings.
56	8	"Hemp and Folk Religion"; Transliteration: "Taima to minkan shinkō" (Japanese: 大麻と民間信仰)	TBA	TBA	TBA	November 20, 2026	TBD
Jinshi's caravan, sent West to address the impending locust plague and political tensions in the former Yi Clan territory (now held by Gyokuyou's father Gyokuen), stops by a hemp-producing village which worships the White Snake deity to resupply, as well as prepare for the journey ahead, which includes dealing with bandits. Meanwhile, Ah-Duo and Lishu are ambushed by the bandits but Basen handily defeats them. Maomao discovers that Suirei is with them, while Ah-Duo later reveals that Jinshi's western mission includes meeting regional leaders and finding him a suitable wife.

== Home media release ==
=== Japanese ===
Toho Animation (Japan – Region 2/A)
Vol.	Episodes	Release date	Ref.
Season 1
1	1–6	January 24, 2024	
2	7–12	March 20, 2024	
3	13–18	May 22, 2024	
4	19–24	July 17, 2024	
Season 2
1	25–30	April 16, 2025	
2	31–36	July 16, 2025	
3	37–42	August 20, 2025	
4	43–48	October 15, 2025	
Season 3
1	49–54	February 17, 2027	
2	55–60	April 21, 2027	
3	61–66	August 18, 2027	
4	67–72	October 20, 2027	

=== English ===
Crunchyroll, LLC (North America – Region 1/A)
Part	Discs	Episodes	Release date	Ref.
Season 1
1	2	1–12	January 28, 2025	
2	2	13–24	March 25, 2025	
Season 2
1	4	25–48	November 10, 2026	
