= List of The Apothecary Diaries volumes =

The Apothecary Diaries is a Japanese light novel series written by Hyūganatsu and illustrated by Touko Shino. Originally, the series was only published by Hyūganatsu on the user-generated web novel site Shōsetsuka ni Narō in October 2011. The publisher Shufunotomo acquired the series and then published it on their Ray Books imprint as a novel with a single volume on September 26, 2012, illustrated by Megumi Matsuda.

In 2014, Shufunotomo began to publish the series again, illustrated by Touko Shino. This time, it was published as a light novel in their Hero Bunko imprint, which is mostly made of acquired Shōsetsuka ni Narō titles. Since then, the series continued to get more volumes with the story continuing, unlike the previous novel version which had just one volume. J-Novel Club announced in November 2020 that it had licensed the light novel series. In October 2023, Square Enix announced that it would release the light novels in print starting in May 2024.

A manga adaptation by Itsuki Nanao and illustrated by Nekokurage began in Square Enix's Monthly Big Gangan on May 25, 2017. Square Enix has compiled its chapters into individual tankōbon volumes. The first volume was published on September 25, 2017. As of July 24, 2026, 17 volumes have been published.

In November 2019, Square Enix announced the English language release of the manga in North America and began publishing it in December 2020.

An alternative manga adaptation, titled The Apothecary Diaries: Maomao's Notes on the Inner Palace (薬屋のひとりごと～猫猫の後宮謎解き手帳～, Kusuriya no Hitorigoto: Maomao no Kōkyū Nazotoki Techō), illustrated by Minoji Kurata, began in Shogakukan's Monthly Sunday Gene-X on August 19, 2017. Shogakukan has compiled its chapters into individual tankōbon volumes. The first volume was published on February 19, 2018. As of June 18, 2026, 22 volumes have been published. The manga has been licensed in Southeast Asia by Shogakukan Asia.

== Light novel ==
No.	Original release date	Original ISBN	English release date	English ISBN
1	August 29, 2014	978-4-07-298198-6	February 14, 2021 (ebook); May 14, 2024 (print)	978-1-7183-6118-8 (ebook); 978-1-64609-272-7 (print)
Chapter 1: "Maomao"; Chapter 2: "The Two Consorts"; Chapter 3: "Jinshi"; Chapter 4: "The Nymph's Smile"; Chapter 5: "Attendant"; Chapter 6: "Poison Tester"; Chapter 7: "Branch"; Chapter 8: "Love Potion"; Chapter 9: "Cacao"; Chapter 10: "The Unsettling Matter of the Spirit (Part One)"; Chapter 11: "The Unsettling Matter of the Spirit (Part Two)"; Chapter 12: "The Threat"; Chapter 13: "Nursing"; Chapter 14: "The Fire"; Chapter 15: "Covert Operations"; Chapter 16: "The Garden Party (Part One)"; Chapter 17: "The Garden Party (Part Two)"; Chapter 18: "The Garden Party (Part Three)"; Chapter 19: "After the Festivities"; Chapter 20: "Fingers"; Chapter 21: "Lihaku"; Chapter 22: "Homecoming"; Chapter 23: "Wheat Stalks"; Chapter 24: "A Misunderstanding"; Chapter 25: "Wine"; Chapter 26: "Two 'Cides to Every Story"; Chapter 27: "Honey (Part One)"; Chapter 28: "Honey (Part Two)"; Chapter 29: "Honey (Part Three)"; Chapter 30: "Ah-Duo"; Chapter 31: "Dismissal"; Epilogue: "The Eunuch and the Courtesan"
2	January 31, 2015	978-4-07-410821-3	June 3, 2021 (ebook); August 6, 2024 (print)	978-1-7183-6120-1 (ebook); 978-1-64609-273-4 (print)
Prologue; Chapter 1: "Serving in the Outer Court"; Chapter 2: "The Pipe"; Chapter 3: "Teaching at the Rear Palace"; Chapter 4: "Raw Fish"; Chapter 5: "Lead"; Chapter 6: "Makeup"; Chapter 7: "A Jaunt Around Town"; Chapter 8: "The Plum Poison"; Chapter 9: "Lakan"; Chapter 10: "Suirei"; Chapter 11: "Chance or Something More"; Chapter 12: "The Ritual"; Chapter 13: "Thornapple"; Chapter 14: "Gaoshun"; Chapter 15: "Rear Palace Redux"; Chapter 16: "Paper"; Chapter 17: "How to Buy Out a Contract"; Chapter 18: "Blue Roses"; Chapter 19: "Red Nails"; Chapter 20: "Balsam and Woodsorrel"; Epilogue
3	June 29, 2015	978-4-07-401176-6	September 14, 2021 (ebook); November 5, 2024 (print)	978-1-7183-6122-5 (ebook); 978-1-64609-274-1 (print)
Prologue; Chapter 1: "Books"; Chapter 2: "The Cat"; Chapter 3: "The Caravan"; Chapter 4: "Perfume Oil"; Chapter 5: "Corpse Fungus (Part One)"; Chapter 6: "Corpse Fungus (Part Two)"; Chapter 7: "Mirrors"; Chapter 8: "The Moon Spirit"; Chapter 9: "The Clinic"; Chapter 10: "Third Time's the Charm (Part One)"; Chapter 11: "Third Time's the Charm (Part Two)"; Chapter 12: "The Shrine of Choosing"; Chapter 13: "The Empress Dowager"; Chapter 14: "His Former Majesty"; Chapter 15: "Scary Stories"; Chapter 16: "Beating the Heat"; Chapter 17: "The Hunt (Part One)"; Chapter 18: "The Hunt (Part Two)"; Chapter 19: "The Hunt (Part Three)"; Epilogue
4	September 30, 2015	978-4-07-403100-9	January 5, 2022 (ebook); February 4, 2025 (print)	978-1-7183-6124-9 (ebook); 978-1-64609-297-0 (print)
Prologue; Chapter 1: "The Bath"; Chapter 2: "Seki-u"; Chapter 3: "The Dancing Ghost"; Chapter 4: "The Rumored Eunuchs"; Chapter 5: "Ice"; Chapter 6: "Breech Birth"; Chapter 7: "Festering Resentment (Part One)"; Chapter 8: "Festering Resentment (Part Two)"; Chapter 9: "The Fox and the Tanuki Match Wits"; Chapter 10: "Traces"; Chapter 11: "The Fox Village"; Chapter 12: "Lantern Plant"; Chapter 13: "Festival"; Chapter 14: "The Worksite"; Chapter 15: "The Stronghold"; Chapter 16: "Lahan"; Chapter 17: "Taibon"; Chapter 18: "Feifa"; Chapter 19: "The Army Marches"; Chapter 20: "The Ambush"; Chapter 21: "How it Began"; Chapter 22: "In the Clutches of the Fox"; Epilogue
5	April 30, 2016	978-4-07-416947-4	May 9, 2022 (ebook); May 6, 2025 (print)	978-1-7183-6126-3 (ebook); 978-1-64609-324-3 (print)
Prologue; Chapter 1: "Locusts"; Chapter 2: "Ukyou"; Chapter 3: "Sleep"; Chapter 4: "The Fire-Rat Cloak"; Chapter 5: "Let Them Eat Cake"; Chapter 6: "The Last Volume"; Chapter 7: "The White-Snake Immortal"; Chapter 8: "Proficiencies"; Chapter 9: "The Paper Village"; Chapter 10: "Hemp and Folk Religion"; Chapter 11: "Bandits"; Chapter 12: "Problems Accumulate"; Chapter 13: "The Western Capital – Day One"; Chapter 14: "The Western Capital – Day Two"; Chapter 15: "The Banquet (Part One)"; Chapter 16: "The Banquet (Part Two)"; Epilogue
6	November 30, 2016	978-4-07-420788-6	October 10, 2022; August 5, 2025 (print)	978-1-7183-6128-7 (ebook); 978-1-64609-325-0 (print)
Prologue; Chapter 1: "The Western Capital—Day Four"; Chapter 2: "The Floating Bride (Part One)"; Chapter 3: "The Floating Bride (Part Two)"; Chapter 4: "Homeward Bound"; Chapter 5: "Wrapping Up in the Western Capital"; Chapter 6: "The La Clan (Part One)"; Chapter 7: "The La Clan (Part Two)"; Chapter 8: "The Conclusion of Lishu's Journey"; Chapter 9: "Homecoming"; Chapter 10: "The Bad Dumplings"; Chapter 11: "The Dancing Water Sprite"; Chapter 12: "The Trials of Consort Lishu"; Chapter 13: "Scandal (Part One)"; Chapter 14: "Scandal (Part Two)"; Chapter 15: "Scandal (Part Three)"; Chapter 16: "Basen and Lishu"; Epilogue
7	February 28, 2018	978-4-07-429772-6	March 1, 2023; November 4, 2025 (print)	978-1-7183-6130-0 (ebook); 978-1-64609-326-7 (print)
Prologue; Chapter 1: "The Court Ladies' Service Exam"; Chapter 2: "Harassment"; Chapter 3: "Medical Assistant"; Chapter 4: "The Rear Palace"; Chapter 5: "Fortune Cookies"; Chapter 6: "Strategist Down"; Chapter 7: "Aylin's Intentions"; Chapter 8: "The Thought Behind the Thought"; Chapter 9: "Empress"; Chapter 10: "Covert Ops"; Chapter 11: "Before the Celebration"; Chapter 12: "Child of a Foreign Land"; Chapter 13: "Lady-in-Waiting to His Majesty's Younger Brother"; Chapter 14: "Meeting the Shrine Maiden"; Chapter 15: ""Mom""; Chapter 16: "The Dinner"; Chapter 17: "The Suspect"; Chapter 18: "A Man and a Woman Play the Game"; Chapter 19: "The Truth Behind the Truth"; Chapter 20: "Mushroom Congee"; Chapter 21: "The Shrine Maiden's Confession"; Chapter 22: "The Future Shrine Maiden"; Epilogue
8	February 28, 2019	978-4-07-436884-6	May 29, 2023; February 3, 2026 (print)	978-1-7183-6132-4 (ebook); 978-1-64609-423-3 (print)
Prologue; Chapter 1: "The Go Book"; Chapter 2: "A Jaunt Around Town"; Chapter 3: "Trends"; Chapter 4: "The Ma Siblings"; Chapter 5: "Cards"; Chapter 6: "Thunderclap"; Chapter 7: "The Expedition"; Chapter 8: "Harassment"; Chapter 9: "Jinshi's Idea"; Chapter 10: "Baitang"; Chapter 11: "Sport and Fear"; Chapter 12: "Bad Cooking"; Chapter 13: "The Hair Stick Thief"; Chapter 14: "The Go Contest (Part One)"; Chapter 15: "The Go Contest (Interlude)"; Chapter 16: "The Go Contest (Part Two)"; Chapter 17: "Freak vs. Perv"; Chapter 18: "The Fingers' Owner"; Chapter 19: "The Go Sage"; Chapter 20: "Check"; Epilogue
9	February 28, 2020	978-4-07-442420-7; 978-4-07-441030-9 (LE)	October 9, 2023; May 5, 2026 (print)	978-1-7183-6134-8 (ebook); 978-1-64609-424-0 (print)
Prologue; Chapter 1: "Yao's Request"; Chapter 2: "The Villa"; Chapter 3: "Kada's Book (Part 1)"; Chapter 4: "Kada's Book (Part 2)"; Chapter 5: "Kada's Book (Part 3)"; Chapter 6: "An Invitation to the Western Capital"; Chapter 7: "Taboo"; Chapter 8: "Secret Lessons"; Chapter 9: "The Message"; Chapter 10: "Practical Exercises"; Chapter 11: "The Dissection"; Chapter 12: "The Secret of the Numbers"; Chapter 13: "Gyoku-ou"; Chapter 14: "Selection"; Chapter 15: "Preparations"; Chapter 16: "A Voyage by Sea"; Chapter 17: "Chue"; Chapter 18: "Anan's Banquet"; Chapter 19: "The Quack Vanishes"; Chapter 20: "Smack Up Against the Wall"; Epilogue
10	January 29, 2021	978-4-07-447215-4	January 18, 2024; August 4, 2026 (print)	978-1-7183-6136-2 (ebook); 978-1-64609-425-7 (print)
Prologue; Chapter 1: "Return to the Western Capital"; Chapter 2: "Boss and Former Boss"; Chapter 3: "The Annex and the Forgotten Man"; Chapter 4: "Spring Comes to Basen (Part 1)"; Chapter 5: "Spring Comes to Basen (Part 2)"; Chapter 6: "The Farm Village (Part 1)"; Chapter 7: "The Farm Village (Part 2)"; Chapter 8: "An Old Man's Ramblings"; Chapter 9: "Rite and Ritual"; Chapter 10: "Results Reported"; Chapter 11: "The Feitouman (Part 1)"; Chapter 12: "The Feitouman (Part 2)"; Chapter 13: "The Windreader Tribe"; Chapter 14: "The Past and the Possible"; Chapter 15: "The Short Straw"; Chapter 16: "A Moment's Peace"; Chapter 17: "Disaster (Part 1)"; Chapter 18: "Disaster (Part 2)"; Chapter 19: "Scratches"; Chapter 20: "Confirmation"; Epilogue
11	April 30, 2021	978-4-07-448226-9; 978-4-07-448440-9 (LE)	May 20, 2024	978-1-7183-6138-6
Prologue; Chapter 1: "Dried Fruit"; Chapter 2: "The Strategist Strikes!"; Chapter 3: "Big Lin"; Chapter 4: "Small Lin"; Chapter 5: "A Brother's Return"; Chapter 6: "From the Capital"; Chapter 7: "The Letters That Arrived"; Chapter 8: "The Letters That Didn't"; Chapter 9: "The Meeting"; Chapter 10: "The Golden Ratio"; Chapter 11: "The Coal Mine"; Chapter 12: "Mother versus Son"; Chapter 13: "A Visit to the Ill"; Chapter 14: "Tianyu"; Chapter 15: "Violence"; Chapter 16: "Gyokuen's Children"; Chapter 17: "In the Shadow of the Ritual"; Chapter 18: "The Siblings' Conference"; Chapter 19: "The Weeping Wind (Part One)"; Chapter 20: "The Weeping Wind (Part Two)"; Chapter 21: "The Strategist Takes Command"; Chapter 22: "The Imperial Younger Brother's Complaint"; Epilogue
12	July 29, 2022	978-4-07-452400-6; 978-4-07-452386-3 (LE)	October 14, 2024	978-1-7183-6140-9
Prologue; Chapter 1: "The Princeling of the Main House"; Chapter 2: "The Greenhouse and the Chapel"; Chapter 3: "Gyoku-ou's Children"; Chapter 4: "The Sheltered Wife"; Chapter 5: "Third Son, Second Son, Eldest Son"; Chapter 6: "The Winery"; Chapter 7: "The Inheritance"; Chapter 8: "Junjie"; Chapter 9: "The Foreign Girl"; Chapter 10: "Emergency Patient, Emergency Situation"; Chapter 11: "The Southern Inn Town"; Chapter 12: "The Kingdom of the Ri People"; Chapter 13: "The Biaoshi"; Chapter 14: "Disguise"; Chapter 15: "Priorities"; Chapter 16: "The Liar"; Chapter 17: "A Town of Faith"; Chapter 18: "The Bandits' Hideout"; Chapter 19: "The Bandit Village (Part One)"; Chapter 20: "The Bandit Village (Part Two)"; Chapter 21: "Serving Dinner"; Chapter 22: "How Things Turned Out"; Chapter 23: "The Road Home"; Chapter 24: "A Wounded Beast"; Chapter 25: "The Ugly Little Sparrow"; Chapter 26: "Man and Wife"; Chapter 27: "Master and Pupil"; Chapter 28: "Sound Sleep"; Chapter 29: "The Compromise"; Chapter 30: "Growth"; Epilogue
13	February 25, 2023	978-4-07-454379-3	January 10, 2025	978-1-7183-6142-3
Chapter 1: "Lahan and Sanfan"; Chapter 2: "Lahan and the Dangling Corpse (Part One)"; Chapter 3: "Lahan and the Dangling Corpse (Part Two)"; Chapter 4: "Lahan and the Dangling Corpse (Part Three)"; Chapter 5: "Jinshi and the Report"; Chapter 6: "Tianyu's Medical-Office Diary"; Chapter 7: "Maamei and Her Inept Brothers"; Chapter 8: "True Records of an Elder Brother"; Chapter 9: "En'en's Day Off"; Chapter 10: "En'en and the Love Chat"; Chapter 11: "A Flower Called Joka"; Chapter 12: "Joka and Her Little Sister"; Chapter 13: "Yao and the Return of Lahan's Brother"; Chapter 14: "Ah-Duo's Truth"; Chapter 15: "Jinshi's Shock, Maomao's Resolution"; Chapter 16: "Maomao and the Late Dinner"
14	September 29, 2023	978-4-07-455775-2	May 30, 2025	978-1-7183-6144-7
Chapter 1: "The Meeting of the Named (Part One)"; Chapter 2: "The Meeting of the Named (Part Two)"; Chapter 3: "The Shin Heirloom"; Chapter 4: "The Rabbit and the Dragon"; Chapter 5: "A Gong Resounds in the Heart"; Chapter 6: "The Horse and the Rabbit"; Chapter 7: "The Vanished Thief (Part One)"; Chapter 8: "The Vanished Thief (Part Two)"; Chapter 9: "A Courtesan's Time to Quit"; Chapter 10: "A Flower Signature"; Chapter 11: "Their Juniors"; Chapter 12: "Life in the Medical Office by the Training Grounds"; Chapter 13: "A Duel and Its Price"; Chapter 14: "Two Good Friends"; Chapter 15: "Contradictions and Goals"; Chapter 16: "Yo"; Chapter 17: "The Forbidden Hunting Ground"; Chapter 18: "Kada's Descendants"; Chapter 19: "The Still-Hidden Treasure (Part One)"; Chapter 20: "The Still-Hidden Treasure (Part Two)"; Chapter 21: "The Road Home"; Epilogue: "Those Who Sow Malice"
15	March 29, 2024	978-4-07-456728-7	September 12, 2025	978-1-7183-6146-1
Chapter 1: "The Selection Exam"; Chapter 2: "Smallpox and Chickenpox"; Chapter 3: "Reassignment"; Chapter 4: "Drug Trials"; Chapter 5: "A Book Restored"; Chapter 6: "The Patient"; Chapter 7: "A Man's Romance"; Chapter 8: "Anesthesia"; Chapter 9: "To Everyone a Purpose"; Chapter 10: "Gyouyoh"; Chapter 11: "The Special Unit"; Chapter 12: "Explanation and Agreement"; Chapter 13: "Sowing Seeds"; Chapter 14: "The Patient's Consent"; Chapter 15: "Confession—The Surface"; Chapter 16: "Confession—The Secret"; Chapter 17: "Anxiety"; Chapter 18: "Before the Surgery"; Chapter 19: "During the Surgery"; Chapter 20: "After the Surgery"; Epilogue
16	May 30, 2025	978-4-07-461876-7; 978-4-07-461882-8 (LE)	May 29, 2026	978-1-7183-6148-5
Prologue; Chapter 1: "The Calm Before the Storm"; Chapter 2: "Lahan's Family Tree"; Chapter 3: "Red Plum Village"; Chapter 4: "Medicinal Congee"; Chapter 5: "The Doctors' Conference"; Chapter 6: "The Interview"; Chapter 7: "Materials"; Chapter 8: "The Cursed Jar"; Chapter 9: "The Patriarch's Daughter (Part One)"; Chapter 10: "The Patriarch's Daughter (Part Two)"; Chapter 11: "Gardenia and Safflower"; Chapter 12: "Cleaning House"; Chapter 13: "Tomatoes"; Chapter 14: "Yao's Growth"; Chapter 15: "Letters"; Chapter 16: "Peerless Changsha"; Chapter 17: "The Jade Elder (Part One)"; Chapter 18: "The Jade Elder (Part Two)"; Chapter 19: "Dr. Liu's Question"; Chapter 20: "Idle Chatter"; Chapter 21: "The Attacker (Part One)"; Chapter 22: "The Attacker (Part Two)"; Chapter 23: "Quarantine"; Chapter 24: "Penghou"; Epilogue

== Manga ==
=== The Apothecary Diaries ===
No.	Original release date	Original ISBN	English release date	English ISBN
1	September 25, 2017	978-4-06-388690-0	December 8, 2020	978-1-64609-070-9
Chapter 1. "The Curse of the Inner Court" (後宮の呪い, Kōkyū no Noroi); Chapter 2. "The Mad Scientist" (狂科学者(マッドサイエンティスト), Maddo Saientisuto); Chapter 3. "The Heavenly Maiden of the Court" (宮中の天女, Kyūchū no Tennyo); Chapter 4. "The Moonlight Ghost" (月下の幽霊, Gekka no Yūrei)
2	February 24, 2018	978-4-7575-5640-9	February 9, 2021	978-1-64609-071-6
Chapter 5. "Caring for the Consort" (看病, Kanbyō); Chapter 6. "The Garden Banquet ①" (園遊会(その①), Enyūkai (Sono Ichi)); Chapter 7. "The Garden Banquet ②" (園遊会(その②), Enyūkai (Sono Ni)); Chapter 8. "The Garden Banquet ③" (園遊会(その③), Enyūkai (Sono San))
3	July 25, 2018	978-4-7575-5794-9	September 21, 2021	978-1-64609-072-3
Chapter 9. "Maomao's Deductions" (猫猫の推理, Maomao no Suri); Chapter 10. "The Meaning of the Hairpins" (簪の意味, Kanzashi no Imi); Chapter 11. "Returning Home" (里帰り, Satogaeri); Chapter 12. "Straw" (麦稈, Mugiwara); Chapter 13. "The Misunderstanding" (誤解, Gokai); Chapter 14. "Alcohol" (酒, Sake)
4	February 25, 2019	978-4-7575-5963-9	December 28, 2021	978-1-64609-073-0
Chapter 15. "A Request for Maomao" (猫猫への依頼, Maomao e no Irai); Chapter 16. "Honey ①" (蜂蜜 その①, Hachimitsu Sono Ichi); Chapter 17. "Honey ②" (蜂蜜 その②", Hachimitsu Sono Ni); Chapter 18. "Consort Aduo" (阿多妃(アードゥオ), Āduo); Chapter 19. "Miscommunication" (すれ違い, Surechigai); Chapter 20. "The Eunuch and the Courtesan" (宦官と妓女, Kangan to Gijo); Chapter 21. "Packing Up" (荷造り, Nizukuri)
5	July 25, 2019	978-4-7575-6216-5	July 12, 2022	978-1-64609-074-7
Chapter 22. "Working in the Outer Court" (外廷勤務, Gaitei Kinmu); Chapter 23. "The Inner Court Classroom" (後宮教室, Kōkyū Kyōshitsu); Chapter 24. "The Smoking Pipe" (煙管, Kiseru); Chapter 25. "A Dish of Raw Fish" (鱠, Namasu); Chapter 26. "Lead" (鉛, Namari)
6	March 25, 2020	978-4-7575-6581-4	September 13, 2022	978-1-64609-086-0
Chapter 27. "Makeup" (化粧, Keshō); Chapter 28. "A Walk Through the City" (街歩き, Machiaruki); Chapter 29. "Syphilis" (梅毒, Baidoku); Chapter 30. "Suirei" (翆苓, Suirei); Chapter 31. "Just a Coincidence?" (偶然か必然か, Gūzen ka Hitsuzen ka); Chapter 32. "The Ritual" (中祀, Chūshi)
7	November 25, 2020	978-4-7575-6856-3	December 13, 2022	978-1-64609-120-1
Chapter 33. "Thorn Apple" (曼荼羅華, Mandarake); Chapter 34. "Gao Shun" (高順(ガオシュン), Gao Shun); Chapter 35. "To the Inner Court Once More" (後宮ふたたび, Kōkyū Futatabi); Chapter 36. "Blue Roses and Red Nails" (青薔薇と爪紅, Aosōbi to Tsumakurenai)
8	May 25, 2021	978-4-7575-7271-3	July 11, 2023	978-1-64609-134-8
Chapter 37. "Rose Balsam and Wood Sorrel ①" (鳳仙花と片喰(前編), Hōsenka to Katabami (Zenpen)); Chapter 38. "Rose Balsam and Wood Sorrel ②" (鳳仙花と片喰(中編), Hōsenka to Katabami (Chūhen)); Chapter 39. "Rose Balsam and Wood Sorrel ③" (鳳仙花と片喰(後編), Hōsenka to Katabami (Kōhen)); Chapter 40. "Send-Off" (見送り, Miokuri); Chapter 41. "Books" (書, Sho); Chapter 42. "The Cats" (猫, Neko)
9	November 25, 2021	978-4-7575-7586-8	August 15, 2023	978-1-64609-135-5
Chapter 43. "The Caravan" (隊商(キャラバン), Kyaraban); Chapter 44. "Corpse Fungus ①" (冬人夏草 (前編), Fuyuhito Natsukusa (Zenpen)); Chapter 45. "Corpse Fungus ②" (冬人夏草 (後編), Fuyuhito Natsukusa (Kōhen)); Chapter 46. "Mirrors" (鏡, Kagami); Chapter 47. "The Moon Fairy ①" (月精 (前編), Gessei (Zenpen))
10	June 23, 2022	978-4-7575-7985-9	November 28, 2023	978-1-64609-136-2
Chapter 48. "The Moon Fairy ②" (月精 (後編), Gessei (Kōhen)); Chapter 49. "The Clinic" (診療所, Shinryōsho); Chapter 50. "A Third Turn at the Crystal Palace ①" (みたび、水晶宮 (前編), Mitabi, Suishōgū (Zenpen)); Chapter 51. "A Third Turn at the Crystal Palace ②" (みたび、水晶宮 (中編), Mitabi, Suishōgū (Chūhen)); Chapter 52. "A Third Turn at the Crystal Palace ③" (みたび、水晶宮 (後編), Mitabi, Suishōgū (Kōhen)); Chapter 53. "The Shrine of Choosing ①" (選択の廟 (前編), Sentaku no Byō (Zenpen))
11	February 25, 2023	978-4-7575-8324-5	March 5, 2024	978-1-64609-252-9
Chapter 54. "The Shrine of Choosing ②" (選択の廟 (後編), Sentaku no Byō (Kōhen)); Chapter 55. "The Empress Dowager" (皇太后, Kōtaigō); Chapter 56. "The Late Emperor ①" (先帝 (前編), Sentei (Zenpen)); Chapter 57. "The Late Emperor ②" (先帝 (中編), Sentei (Chūhen)); Chapter 58. "The Late Emperor ③" (先帝 (後編), Sentei (Kōhen))
12	September 29, 2023	978-4-7575-8813-4	September 3, 2024	978-1-64609-296-3
Chapter 59. "Ghost Stories" (怪談, Kaidan); Chapter 60. "Summer Retreat" (避暑地, Hishochi); Chapter 61. "The Hunt ①" (狩り (前編), Kari (Zenpen)); Chapter 62. "The Hunt ②" (狩り (中編), Kari (Chūhen)); Chapter 63. "The Hunt ③" (狩り (後編), Kari (Kōhen))
13	March 25, 2024	978-4-7575-9027-4; 978-4-7575-9028-1 (SE)	March 4, 2025	978-1-64609-347-2
Chapter 64. "The Veiled Noble" (覆面の御方, Fukumen no Okata); Chapter 65. "The Bathhouse" (湯殿, Yudono); Chapter 66. "Seki-u" (赤羽, Akabane); Chapter 67. "The Dancing Ghost" (踊る幽霊, Odoru Yūrei); Chapter 68. "The Rumored Eunuchs and Ice" (噂の宦官と氷菓, Uwasa no Kangan to Hyōka)
14	September 25, 2024	978-4-7575-9439-5; 978-4-7575-9440-1 (SE)	October 7, 2025	978-1-64609-422-6
Chapter 69. "Breech Baby" (逆子, Sakago); Chapter 70. "A Malignancy Within ①" (巣食う悪意①, Sukū akui①); Chapter 71. "A Malignancy Within ②" (巣食う悪意②", Sukū akui②); Chapter 72. "The Fox and the Tanuki Match Wits" (狐と狸の化かし合い, Kitsune to Tanuki no Bakashi Ai); Chapter 73. "Clues" (足跡, Ashiato); Chapter 74. "The Fox Village" (狐の里, Kitsune no Sato)
15	March 25, 2025	978-4-7575-9769-3	March 17, 2026	978-1-64609-456-1
Chapter 75. "Lantern Flowers" (鬼灯, Hōzuki); Chapter 76. "The Festival" (祭り, Matsuri); Chapter 77. "Where There's a Deal to Be Made" (取引現場, Torihiki Genba); Chapter 78. "The Fortress" (砦, Toride)
16	November 25, 2025	978-4-301-00194-2	November 3, 2026	979-8-899-10020-8
Chapter 79. "Pit of Vipers" (蟇盆, Hiki bon); Chapter 80. "Firearms" (飛発, Hihatsu); Chapter 81. "The Army Marches" (行軍, Kōgun)
17	July 24, 2026	978-4-3010-0655-8	—	—
Chapter 82. Kishū Sakusen (奇襲作戦); Chapter 83. Subete ga hajimatta basho (すべてが始まった場所); Chapter 84. Kitsune ni Tsumamareta (狐につままれた)

=== Maomao's Notes on the Inner Palace ===
No.	Original release date	Original ISBN	English release date	English ISBN
1	February 19, 2018	978-4-09-157515-9	October 20, 2026	978-1-9747-6871-4
Chapter 1. "Maomao and the Curse"; Chapter 2. "Aphrodisiacs"; Chapter 3. "Fuyo Under the Moonlight"; Chapter 4. "Imperial Command"; Chapter 5. "Nursing Back to Health"
2	July 19, 2018	978-4-09-157533-3	October 20, 2026	978-1-9747-6871-4
Chapter 6. "The Garden Banquet"; Chapter 7. "Food Taster"; Chapter 8. "Returning Home"; Chapter 9. "A Maid's Death"; Bonus Story. "The Apothecary of the Pleasure District"
3	September 19, 2018	978-4-09-157543-2	December 15, 2026	978-1-9747-6872-1
4	February 19, 2019	978-4-09-157560-9	December 15, 2026	978-1-9747-6872-1
5	June 19, 2019	978-4-09-157564-7	February 16, 2027	978-1-9747-6873-8
6	November 19, 2019	978-4-09-157580-7	February 16, 2027	978-1-9747-6873-8
7	February 19, 2020	978-4-09-157586-9	—	—
8	June 19, 2020	978-4-09-157597-5	—	—
9	October 16, 2020	978-4-09-157608-8	—	—
10	February 19, 2021	978-4-09-157622-4	—	—
11	June 18, 2021	978-4-09-157639-2	—	—
12	October 19, 2021	978-4-09-157652-1	—	—
13	February 18, 2022	978-4-09-157668-2	—	—
14	June 17, 2022	978-4-09-157680-4	—	—
15	November 17, 2022	978-4-09-157692-7	—	—
16	February 25, 2023	978-4-09-157731-3	—	—
17	September 29, 2023	978-4-09-157783-2	—	—
18	March 19, 2024	978-4-09-157817-4	—	—
19	December 19, 2024	978-4-09-157847-1	—	—
20	May 19, 2025	978-4-09-157881-5	—	—
21	December 19, 2025	978-4-09-158208-9	—	—
22	June 18, 2026	978-4-09-158229-4	—	—
23	December 9, 2026	978-4-09-158254-6	—	—

=== Xiaolan's Story ===
No.	Original release date	Original ISBN	English release date	English ISBN
1	November 25, 2025	978-4-301-00195-9	October 6, 2026	979-8-89910-042-0
