= The Failure at God School =

Japanese manga series

- First tankōbon volume cover

神さま学校の落ちこぼれ (Kami-sama Gakkō no Ochikobore)
- Genre: Drama; Supernatural
- Manga
- Written by: Hyūganatsu
- Illustrated by: Modomu Akagawara
- Published by: Hakusensha
- English publisher: NA: Yen Press
- Imprint: Hana to Yume Comics
- Magazine: Hana to Yume
- Original run: August 5, 2021 – present
- Volumes: 15
- Light novel
- Written by: Hyūganatsu
- Illustrated by: Modomu Akagawara
- Published by: Seikaisha
- Imprint: Seikaisha Fictions
- Original run: January 20, 2022 – present
- Volumes: 5
- Anime television series

The Failure at God School (Japanese: 神さま学校の落ちこぼれ, Hepburn: Kami-sama Gakkō no Ochikobore) is a Japanese manga series written by Hyūganatsu and illustrated by Modomu Akagawara. It began serialization in Hakusensha's shōjo manga magazine Hana to Yume in August 2021. A light novel adaptation began publication under Seikaisha's Seikaisha Fictions imprint in January 2022. An anime television series adaptation has been announced.

== Synopsis ==
In contemporary Japan, the role of kami, is bestowed upon humans with supernatural powers called himiko who hold a state diploma and are then employed at shrines throughout the country. Nagi's grandmother was a goddess, but since her accidental death, no one has come forward to replace her at the town's temple. Nagi's twin brother Takeru looks an ideal candidate. However, he had remained secluded in his room since the tragedy, communicating with his sister only through his telepathic and telekinetic abilities. Lacking such powers herself, Nagi would develop a technique to cut short these mental intrusions when they become too insistent because even though Takeru is a recluse, he's very talkative.

One morning, Nagi discovers her neighborhood in turmoil. A little boy, also destined to become a kami, had vanished. She sets out to find him and discovers him unconscious in the nearby forest. However, when she tries to bring him back, she is stopped by an opposing force. Taking a desperate gamble, she uses her Anti-Takeru Psychic Defense to repel the attack and it works. Nagi unwittingly proves that she has supernatural powers, and finds herself unwillingly enrolled into god training school.

== Media ==
=== Manga ===
Written by Hyūganatsu and illustrated by Modomu Akagawara, The Failure at God School began serialization in Hakusensha's shōjo manga magazine Hana to Yume on August 5, 2021. Its chapters have been compiled into fifteen tankōbon volumes as of September 2026.

During their panel at Anime NYC 2024, Yen Press announced that they had licensed the series for English publication, with the first volume releasing in March 2025.

No.	Original release date	Original ISBN	North American release date	North American ISBN
1	January 20, 2022	978-4-592-22421-1	March 25, 2025	979-8-8554-0459-3
Chapters 1–5; Bonus
2	May 20, 2022	978-4-592-22422-8	July 22, 2025	979-8-8554-0461-6
Chapters 6–10.5
3	September 20, 2022	978-4-592-22423-5	February 24, 2026	979-8-8554-0463-0
Chapters 11–15; Bonus
4	January 20, 2023	978-4-592-22424-2	September 22, 2026	979-8-8554-0465-4
Chapters 16–20; Side story: "Reincarnated"
5	May 19, 2023	978-4-592-22425-9	—	—
6	September 20, 2023	978-4-592-22464-8	—	—
7	January 19, 2024	978-4-592-22472-3	—	—
8	May 20, 2024	978-4-592-22485-3	—	—
9	September 20, 2024	978-4-592-22498-3	—	—
10	January 20, 2025	978-4-592-22515-7	—	—
11	May 20, 2025	978-4-592-22532-4	—	—
12	October 20, 2025	978-4-592-22549-2	—	—
13	February 20, 2026	978-4-592-22568-3	—	—
14	May 20, 2026	978-4-592-22580-5	—	—
15	September 18, 2026	978-4-592-22597-3	—	—

=== Light novel ===
A light novel adaptation began publication under Seikaisha's Seikaisha Fictions light novel imprint on January 20, 2022. Five volumes have been released as of May 28, 2025.

No.	Release date	ISBN
1	January 20, 2022	978-4-06-526778-3
2	January 23, 2023	978-4-06-530637-6
3	January 22, 2024	978-4-06-534533-7
4	September 19, 2024	978-4-06-536373-7
5	May 28, 2025	978-4-06-539672-8

=== Anime ===
An anime television series adaptation was announced on September 18, 2026.

== Reception ==
By September 2024, the series had over 700,000 copies in circulation.

The series was ranked 7th in the fourth Sanyodo Bookstore Comic Awards in 2023.
