= Snowball Earth (manga) =

Japanese manga series

- First tankōbon volume cover, featuring Tetsuo Yabusame

スノウボールアース (Sunoubōru Āsu)
- Genre: Mecha; Survival
- Manga
- Written by: Yuhiro Tsujitsugu
- Published by: Shogakukan
- English publisher: NA: Viz Media
- Imprint: Big Comics
- Magazine: Monthly Big Comic Spirits
- Original run: January 27, 2021 – present
- Volumes: 12
- Anime television series
- Directed by: Munehisa Sakai; Takeshi Iwata (assistant)
- Written by: Shigeru Murakoshi
- Music by: Tatsuya Kato; Hiroaki Tsutsumi; Yuki Kanesaka
- Studio: Studio Kai
- Licensed by: Crunchyroll (streaming); Disney Platform Distribution (streaming); SEA: Muse Communication
- Original network: NNS (Nippon TV)
- Original run: April 3, 2026 – present
- Episodes: 13
- icon

Snowball Earth (Japanese: スノウボールアース, Hepburn: Sunoubōru Āsu) is a Japanese manga series written and illustrated by Yuhiro Tsujitsugu. It has been serialized in Shogakukan's seinen manga magazine Monthly Big Comic Spirits since January 2021. An anime television series adaptation produced by Studio Kai aired from April to June 2026. A second season has been announced.

== Plot ==
Tetsuo Yabusame, a shy boy, and his giant robot Yukio fight against monsters that threaten Earth from outer space. After the final battle, Tetsuo returns to Earth, only to find it covered in snow and ice. Tetsuo resolves to overcome his shyness and save what remains of humanity.

== Characters ==
Tetsuo Yabusame (流鏑馬鉄男, Yabusame Tetsuo)
Voiced by: Takuto Yoshinaga (Japanese); Griffin Burns (English)
An introverted, short-haired boy who pilots a giant robot named Yukio. Despite being Earth's legendary savior, he is a timid boy who struggles to communicate with others.
Yukio (ユキオ)
Voiced by: Daisuke Hirakawa (Japanese); Alejandro Saab (English)
A giant, anti-kaiju robot created by Tetsuo's father. Yukio was originally made to be a robot that defeats kaiju by exploding; however, Tetsuo sneaked in the control room and proved that Yukio is more than a tool.
Ao Nogi (乃木 蒼, Nogi Ao)
Voiced by: Ami Koshimizu (Japanese); Abby Trott^{Ep. 2 credits} (English)
A cheerful, white-haired survivor from the Mishima Mall. Due to a physical mutation from eating kaiju meat, she possesses the rare ability to telepathically control a bird-like kaiju.
Hagane Takimura (瀧村矧音, Takimura Hagane)
Voiced by: Konomi Tamura (Japanese); Madeline Dorroh^{Ep. 5 credits} (English)
The eldest daughter of the Takimura family, she is a talented engineer developing weapons to fight kaiju.
Isseki Sagami (相模 逸石, Sagami Isseki)
Voiced by: Tomokazu Sugita (Japanese); Kellen Goff^{Ep. 5 credits} (English)
A ruthless and intensely jealous leader of VIERDE, known formally as Colonel Sagami. He has the ability to control Hercules, a powerful kaiju.
Tamiya Sakurai (桜井多 見哉, Sakurai Tamiya)
Voiced by: Tomohiro Ōno (Japanese); Darius Marquis Johnson^{Ep. 5 credits} (English)
A member of VIERDE. He belongs to the elite generation of superhumans trained by Colonel Sagami. He can control Eros, a sniper-class kaiju.
Yuma Uzuki (卯月 ゆま, Uzuki Yuma)
Voiced by: Manami Narahira (Japanese); Aria Saltini^{Ep. 5 credits} (English)
A member of VIERDE. A dedicated person who has strong admiration for Colonel Sagami. She can control Artemis, an observation kaiju.
Otoichi Kinoe (甲 乙一, Kinoe Otoichi)
Voiced by: Anna Nagase (Japanese); Laura Stahl^{Ep. 5 credits} (English)
A high ranking officer and strategist of VIERDE. He can control Hermes, a high speed kaiju.
Riko Akagi (赤城 莉子, Akagi Riko)
Voiced by: Maki Kawase (Japanese); Jennifer Sun Bell^{Ep. 5 credits} (English)
A member of VIERDE. Riko can control Aphrodite.
Nayuta Izumi (泉那 由他, Izumi Nayuta)
Voiced by: Kengo Kawanishi (Japanese); Kyle McCarley^{Ep. 6 credits} (English)
A member of VIERDE. He can control Ares, a brawler kaiju.
Makoto Saionji (西園寺 真琴, Saionji Makoto)
Voiced by: Chitose Morinaga (Japanese); Anne Yatco^{Ep. 6 credits} (English)
A member of VIERDE. He can control Hephaestus, also known as "The Commander's Cauldron".

== Media ==
=== Manga ===
Written and illustrated by Yuhiro Tsujitsugu, Snowball Earth has been serialized in Shogakukan's seinen manga magazine Monthly Big Comic Spirits since January 27, 2021. In September 2026, Tsujitsugu announced that the manga would start its final story arc. Shogakukan has collected its chapters into individual tankōbon volumes. The first volume was released on July 30, 2021. As of September 30, 2026, twelve volumes have been released.

In June 2023, Viz Media announced that they have licensed the manga for an English release in North America, and the first volume was released on April 16, 2024.

==== Volumes ====
| No. | Original release date | Original ISBN | English release date | English ISBN |
|---|---|---|---|---|
| 1 | July 30, 2021 | 978-4-09-861107-2 | April 16, 2024 | 978-1-9747-4377-3 |
1. "The Savior Who Could Not Bring Salvation" (救えなかった救世主, Sukuenakatta Kyūseishu); 2. "Welcome to the Ice Age" (いでませ氷河期(アイスエイジ), Idemase Aisueiji); 3. "Tetsuo, Kaiju, and the Survivors" (鉄男と怪獣と生き残り, Tetsuo to Kaijū to Ikinokori); 4. "Snowball" (スノウボール, Sunoubōru); 5. "The Ultimate Duo" (最強のふたり, Saikyō no Futari)
| 2 | November 30, 2021 | 978-4-09-861187-4 | July 16, 2024 | 978-1-9747-4615-6 |
6. "What a Wonderful World" (この素晴らしき世界, Kono Subarashiki Sekai); 7. "Our Savior" (俺たちの救世主, Oretachi no Kyūseishu); 8. "Defying the Moon 1" (月に弓引く1, Tsuki ni Yumihiku 1); 9. "Defying the Moon 2" (月に弓引く2, Tsuki ni Yumihiku 2); 10. "Predation Posture" (捕食態勢, Hoshoku Taisei)
| 3 | March 30, 2022 | 978-4-09-861263-5 | October 15, 2024 | 978-1-9747-4914-0 |
11. "Dogfight" (空中の攻め合い, Kūchū no Semeai); 12. "Mishima Mall" (ミシマ・モール, Mishima Mōru); 13. "Is the Village Burning?" (村(モール)は燃えているか, Mōru wa Moeteiru ka); 14. "Game of Death for Land of Men" ("人間の大地"死亡遊戯, "Ningen no Daichi" Shibō Yūgi); 15. "The Dark of Night and the Light of Dawn" (夜闇と暁光, Yami to Gyōkō)
| 4 | August 30, 2022 | 978-4-09-8613960 | January 21, 2025 | 978-1-9747-5164-8 |
16. "Rampart" (単機要(ランパート)塞, Ranpāto); 17. "Hercules" (帥の剣(ヘラクレス), Herakuresu); 18. "Blue Storm" (青嵐, Seiran); 19. "Savior" (救世主, Kyūseishu); 20. "The Light of the Savior" (救世の灯火, Kyūsei no Tomoshibi)
| 5 | February 28, 2023 | 978-4-09-861589-6 | April 15, 2025 | 978-1-9747-5247-8 |
21. "Mishima Quest" (ミシマ・クエスト, Mishima Kuesuto); 22. "Reach the New Proposed Mall Site!" (新モール候補地へたどり着け!, Shin Mōru Kōhochi e Tadoritsuke!); 23. "Wieder" (Note: Stylized in all caps.); 24. "Galactic Kaiju" (銀河怪獣, Ginga Kaijū); 25. "The One Constant" (常なるものは, Tsune Naru Mono wa)
| 6 | October 30, 2023 | 978-4-09-862646-5 | August 19, 2025 | 978-1-9747-5526-4 |
26. "Tag Team" (ツープラトン, Tsūpuraton); 27. "Yukio's Pilot" (ユキオのパイロット, Yukio no Pairotto); 28. "Junk" (ガラクタ, Garakuta); 29. "Beast and Hand" (獣と手, Kemono to Te); 30. "The Secret of the Lucky Cat" (常招き猫のひみつ, Manekineko no Himitsu)
| 7 | April 30, 2024 | 978-4-09-862763-9 | November 18, 2025 | 978-1-9747-5904-0 |
31. "Black Yukio Arrives!" (登場! 黒いユキオ, Tōjō! Kuroi Yukio); 32. "True E-RDE" (真エルデ, Shin Erude); 33. "Eve of Departure" (出発前夜, Shuppatsu Zenya); 34. "Rokukairiku" (六壊陸); 35. "Third Armament" (第三の武装, Daisan no Busō)
| 8 | November 28, 2024 | 978-4-09-863105-6 | February 17, 2026 | 978-1-9747-6141-8 |
36. "Set Course to Australia" (オーストラリアに進路を取れ, Ōsutoraria ni Shinro o Tore); 37. "Enter! Gold Coast Company!" (突入! ゴールド・コースト・カンパニー!, Totsunyū! Gōrudo Kōsuto Kanpanī!); 38. "Hitohira Sparkles" (煌めきひとひら, Kirameki Hitohira); 39. "Child" (子, Ko); 40. "Fun Guys" (楽しい奴ら, Tanoshī Yatsura)
| 9 | July 30, 2025 | 978-4-09-863518-4 | August 18, 2026 | 978-1-9747-6592-8 |
41. "Nobody"; 42. "Battle of Australia" (バトル・オブ・オーストラリア, Batoru Obu Ōsutoraria); 43. "Promise" (約束, Yakusoku); 44. "Mission" (作戦, Sakusen); 45. "Homecoming" (ホームカミング, Hōmukamingu)
| 10 | December 26, 2025 | 978-4-09-863660-0 | December 15, 2026 | 978-1-9747-6919-3 |
46. Supīchi (スピーチ); 47. Yukio no Kyūjitsu (ユキオの休日); 48. Yukio Sōdatsu Urutorakuizu! (ユキオ争奪ウルトラクイズ!); 49. Kōri no Tanizoko de (氷の谷底で); 50. Kaijū-tachi (怪獣たち)
| 11 | April 1, 2026 | 978-4-09-863805-5 | April 20, 2027 | 978-1-9747-7172-1 |
51. Robo Zero Katana-ryū (ロボ零(ゼロ)刀流); 52. Koi (恋); 53. Koi Amanchisu (恋獣たち(アマンチス)); 54. Misshon Ishii Possiburu (ミッションイシイポッシブル)
| 12 | September 30, 2026 | 978-4-09-864107-9 | — | — |
55. Pawā Sōsu (動力源(パワーソース)); 56. Yabusame Kojika 1 (流鏑馬虎鹿①); 57. Yabusame Kojika 2 (流鏑馬虎鹿②); 58. Yabusame Kojika 3 (流鏑馬虎鹿③); 59. Shitō (死闘)

=== Anime ===
An anime television series adaptation was announced on July 17, 2025. The series was produced by Studio Kai and directed by Munehisa Sakai, with Takeshi Iwata serving as assistant director, Shigeru Murakoshi handling series composition, Toshiya Kono designing the characters and serving as chief animation director, and Tatsuya Kato, Hiroaki Tsutsumi and Yuki Kanesaka composing the music. It aired from April 3 to June 26, 2026, on the Friday Anime Night programming block on Nippon TV and its affiliates. The opening theme song is "Zero", performed by Tuki, while the ending theme song is "Ima Kono Mune ni Tagiru no wa" (今この胸に滾るのは; 'What is Surging in My Heart Now'), performed by Ai Higuchi. Crunchyroll, Disney+ (internationally), and Hulu (in the United States) are streaming the series. Muse Communication licensed the series in Asia-Pacific.

Following the airing of the final episode of the first season, a second season was announced.

==== Episodes ====
| No. | Title | Directed by (Note: Production staff information is taken from the ending credits of each episode.) | Written by | Storyboarded by | Original release date |
|---|---|---|---|---|---|
| 1 | "The Savior Who Could Not Bring Salvation"; Transliteration: "Sukuenakatta Kyūseishu" (救えなかった救世主) | Munehisa Sakai | Shigeru Murakoshi | Munehisa Sakai | April 3, 2026 |
In 2025, humanity is confronted by hostile kaiju from outer space, forcing the former to unite and develop new weapon technologies. One such form is a giant robot designed to lure kaiju to areas where it can destroy them through self-destruction. The robot proves to be so intelligent that he refuses his objective. This fails to convince the robot's creator to reconsider, but his shy son, Tetsuo, sympathetically decides to save the robot by piloting it to kill a kaiju. Over the course of ten years, Tetsuo becomes renowned as "the Savior", having killed many kaiju with the robot, referred to as "Yukio". However, as a result of spending his entire childhood fighting kaiju, Tetsuo has poor social skills. Ten years later, Tetsuo and Yukio take part in the "final battle", where they escort a battleship to destroy a horde of kaiju in space. However, the battleship unexpectedly ends up getting destroyed, leaving Tetsuo and Yukio to fight the kaiju alone. Heavily damaged, Yukio forcibly ejects Tetsuo, wishing that he can make friends back on Earth, before self-destructing. Eight years later, a shocked Tetsuo discovers the entire planet is covered in snow and ice.
| 2 | "Encounters"; Transliteration: "Deau" (出会う) | Takeshi Iwata | Shigeru Murakoshi | Takeshi Iwata | April 10, 2026 |
Determined to fulfill Yukio's last wish, Tetsuo salvages a mini-excavator and heads out to look for survivors, only to be attacked by a kaiju. They both fall into an underground ice cave, where Tetsuo successfully kills the kaiju by impaling its brain with the mini-excavator. Afterwards, he encounters a trio of survivors led by Ao Nogi, but due to his lack of social skills, is unable to communicate with them before fainting. Upon regaining consciousness, Tetsuo is surprised to find more survivors carving up the dead kaiju for resources. He catches sight of a child about to be crushed by a falling icicle and saves him, much to the gratitude of the boy's father, Korezo Takimura, who befriends him. Ao watches from a distance, and determines that Tetsuo is not a threat. However, a second kaiju then appears, and Tetsuo is shocked to see that unlike all the other kaiju he has fought before, this one has a more humanoid appearance.
| 3 | "My First Friend"; Transliteration: "Hajimete no, Tomodachi" (はじめての、友だち) | Tomoya Tanaka | Shigeru Murakoshi | Kou Matsuo | April 17, 2026 |
Ao deploys a series of fog machines to distract the kaiju, giving her people an opportunity to escape. However, Tetsuo sees the kaiju preparing to attack anyways so he uses himself as a distraction to draw its attention. When it looks like the kaiju is about to eat him, Yukio reactivates and saves him, explaining that he had uploaded his mind into the escape pod, though the installation process did not finish until now. Overjoyed to find his first friend is still alive, Tetsuo enters the cockpit and battles the kaiju in earnest, easily decapitating it with Yukio's sword arm. All of the survivors celebrate Tetsuo's victory, while Ao notices that Tetsuo is experienced at fighting kaiju. Meanwhile, another humanoid kaiju is seen in Tokyo.
| 4 | "The Kaiju Tamer and the Can of Pineapple"; Transliteration: "Kaijū Tsukai to Pain Kan" (怪獣使いとパイン缶) | Kakushi Ifuku | Kōdai Minami | Kakushi Ifuku | April 24, 2026 |
As Ao leads Tetsuo and Yukio back to her settlement, the Mishima Mall, she explains that ten years ago, an abnormal kaiju appeared that commanded a number of orbs that exploded and froze all of Earth and the majority of the human population. The E-RDE organization was also almost completely wiped out, though there are rumors that remnants of them still exist. Tetsuo is welcome as a hero by the Mall, but Ao is taken away to be reprimanded by the elders for leaving without permission. Takimura volunteers to house Tetsuo and treats him to a hot spring bath. As they bathe, Takimura explains that ten years ago, he and Ao were part of a survivor group that were forced to consume kaiju meat to survive. Half of the group died due to their bodies rejecting the meat, but Ao developed a mutation that allowed her to create a telepathic link with a bird-like kaiju. Intrigued, the kaiju offered to protect the survivors in return for learning more about humanity, making Ao the first kaiju tamer. Tetsuo is then led to the kaiju, which sleeps underneath the Mall and keeps the settlement warm with its flames.
| 5 | "Good Job"; Transliteration: "Ganbatta" (がんばった) | Shunsuke Machitani | Takeshi Iwata | Shunsuke Machitani | May 1, 2026 |
The remnants of E-RDE keep surveillance on the abnormal kaiju in Tokyo until it notices them and sends a three-headed kaiju to attack them. Back at Mishima Mall, Ao explains her tamed kaiju, Land of Men, warms their settlement in return for her reading books to him every day. Additionally, Ao can control fire. Takimura takes Tetsuo to his lodgings and meets Takimura's daughter, Hagane. Hagane reveals her mother was the head of the Tech Department, and she also develops technology for the Mall. Meanwhile, the E-RDE remnants, now calling themselves VIERDE, manage to escape Tokyo and learn of Tetsuo's return. Their leader, the Colonel, decides to take both Yukio and Land of Men for themselves. One week later, Hagane quietly leaves the Mall to hunt down Artemis, a tamed VIERDE kaiju responsible for devouring her mother. Using equipment she developed with Tetsuo's help, she embeds countless barbed spikes into Artemis' mouth to prevent him from eating. She then prepares herself for death when Tetsuo and Yukio arrive to save her, forcing Artemis to retreat. VIERDE then arrive with their force of tamed kaiju and attack Yukio, critically damaging him.
| 6 | "Beyond the Madness"; Transliteration: "Kyōki no Yukue" (狂気のゆくえ) | Takeshi Iwata | Shigeru Murakoshi | Takeshi Iwata | May 8, 2026 |
In the past, Sagami was a soldier in E-RDE who distinguished himself with his superior fighting abilities and was hailed a savior. However, he grew jealous when Tetsuo and Yukio emerged, stealing the spotlight from him and he swore to surpass and destroy them. While Tetsuo left Earth to fight the kaiju in space, Sagami positioned himself to train a class of gifted children meant to replace Tetsuo. When the Earth was frozen, he and his students formed VIERDE and became kaiju tamers, mastering superhuman abilities. Despite the damage to Yukio, Tetsuo takes the fight to VIERDE, but he is uncertain how he can win against enemies whose powers he does not know. Reasoning that trying to attack Tetsuo all at once will result unacceptable kaiju losses, Sagami sends his forces to attack Mishima Mall while he faces off against Tetsuo and Yukio with his kaiju, Hercules.
| 7 | "The Cost of Courage"; Transliteration: "Yūki no Daishō" (勇気の代償) | Tomoya Tanaka | Kōdai Minami | Tomoya Tanaka | May 15, 2026 |
Tetsuo and Yukio find themselves barely able to hold their own against Hercules, so Tetsuo attempts to communicate with Sagami to figure out his intentions. However, Sagami's open hostility and desire to kill Tetsuo cause Tetsuo to suffer a nervous breakdown as his social anxiety resurges, affecting his ability to pilot. Meanwhile, Ao and her party sneak out of Mishima Mall to secretly explore the surrounding area. Regretting allowing Tetsuo to communicate with the enemy, Yukio seizes temporary control and manages to escape, using his rocket boosters to fly back to Mishima Mall. During the flight, Tetsuo continues to suffer a breakdown. However, seeing Hagane also break down in tears after she realizes the fear Tetsuo must experience every time he fights kaiju, Tetsuo returns to his senses. They then receive a transmission from an unknown sender warning them to stay away from Mishima Mall as the kaiju are already attacking.
| 8 | "Mishima Mall Activates"; Transliteration: "Mishima Mōru, Kidō" (ミシマ・モール、起動) | Yuichi Wada | Takeshi Iwata | Koichi Ohata | May 22, 2026 |
The VIERDE forces attack Mishima Mall, but are surprised to find it has been reinforced with anti-kaiju defenses, stalling their offensive. Takimura contacts Tetsuo and Hagane and orders them to focus on protecting the people of the Mall who are evacuating to an underground shelter, since Yukio is too damaged to fight. Meanwhile, Sagami attempts to head to the Mall, but is delayed due to Hercules needing to heal from its injuries. Takimura and a small force stay behind to buy as much time for the evacuation as possible before their defenses are overcome. Hearing the Mall is under attack, Ao rushes over, berating herself for her carelessness. She awakens Land of Men and eliminates one of the VIERDE tamer/kaiju pairs, leaving her to fight against the three remaining VIERDE tamer/kaiju pairs.
| 9 | "The Great Kaiju War"; Transliteration: "Kaijū Daisensō" (怪獣大戦争) | Tomoya Tanaka | Shigeru Murakoshi | Hiroshi Kobayashi | May 29, 2026 |
While initially outnumbered, Ao and Land of Men are able to eliminate the remaining VIERDE forces attacking the Mall thanks to their ability to manipulate fire. Meanwhile, Tetsuo, Hagane, and Yukio reach the evacuation shelter where they reunite with the Mall residents. Tetsuo and Yukio then find a 3D printer and old Snowman robot parts, which they can use to repair Yukio, but they have insufficient energy. All of the Mall residents chip in by using bicycle generators to generate the necessary electricity to activate the 3D printer. Back at the Mall, Ao is ambushed by Sagami and Hercules, with Sagami apparently being able to predict all of Ao's moves, and he defeats Land of Men and captures Ao. Tetsuo then arrives in a repaired and upgraded Yukio, and declares that he has found the courage to face Sagami thanks to his desire to protect his new friends.
| 10 | "Wounds You Can Face"; Transliteration: "Tachimukaeru Kizu" (立ち向かえる傷) | Yuichi Wada | Kōdai Minami | Manabu Ono | June 5, 2026 |
Tetsuo and Yukio face off against Sagami and Hercules, but quickly find themselves outmatched due to Sagami's ability to predict the future. While Sagami puts a heavy strain on his own body every time he uses his ability, it ultimately allows him to lock into a future where victory is guaranteed. Meanwhile, Tetsuo tries to analyze Sagami's fighting style and deduces his ability to see the future. However, he has not figured out how to counter it until Ao's followers ram a flying drone into Hercules to distract it. Recalling which attacks were able to hit Hercules, Tetsuo comes to the realization that Sagami can only predict the actions of organic beings. As such, Tetsuo allows Yukio to autonomously pilot himself, and he scores several critical hits. With Hercules too weakened to fight back, Tetsuo regains control and uses a finishing move to cut Hercules into pieces.
| 11 | "I Want to Be a Savior"; Transliteration: "Kyūseishu ni Naritai" (救世主になりたい) | Takeshi Iwata | Takeshi Iwata | Takeshi Iwata | June 12, 2026 |
With the death of Hercules, Sagami suffers a psychic backlash and he begins experiencing flashbacks of his life, revealing his desire to be a savior stems from him being neglected by his parents. When Tetsuo became the new savior, Sagami collaborated with a mysterious E-RDE scientist named Nadare, who helped him rise through the ranks through blackmail and murder so he could form VIERDE. However, when E-RDE decided to shut down VIERDE in order to build the battleship for the final battle, Sagami snapped and had Nadare sabotage it, which resulted in its destruction, and inadvertently caused the near extinction of humanity once the Earth froze over. As a result, Sagami was shocked over what he and Nadare did. In his dazed state, Sagami reveals all of this to Tetsuo and Yukio. Tetsuo rebukes Sagami for trying to be a savior by killing humans instead of kaiju, but understanding the trauma Sagami has suffered, is willing to hand over the title of savior to him.
| 12 | "A Calm and Gentle World"; Transliteration: "Odayakade Yasashii Sekai" (穏やかでやさしい世界) | Tomoya Tanaka & Takeshi Iwata | Shigeru Murakoshi | Tomoya Tanaka | June 19, 2026 |
Sagami, confused at Tetsuo's offer, asks him why he wanted to be a savior. Tetsuo admits that he was forced into the role, but eventually found enjoyment in saving people. One of the VIERDE members, Yuma, comes to rescue Sagami, but a despondent Sagami orders her kill him. Yuma refuses, pointing out that VIERDE would not have survived without him. A flashback reveals that after the Big Freeze occurred, Sagami focused all his energy on protecting his students. However, while searching for supplies, they were trapped in a cave with a frozen kaiju. As such, they consumed the kaiju's meat, with only Sagami and six of his students surviving. Back in the present, Hercules' lower half suddenly comes back to life and attacks Yukio. Meanwhile, another VIERDE member, Riko, confronts Tetsuo, Sagami, and Yuma, revealing that she is an avatar of the humanoid variant kaiju in Tokyo. During VIERDE's scouting mission there, the kaiju secretly devoured Riko and replaced her with the imposter, who reveals herself to be Nadare. She admits she manipulated Sagami into sabotaging E-RDE to enable the Big Freeze. Nadare then prepares to kill Sagami, only for Tetsuo to intervene.
| 13 | "Drink Together"; Transliteration: "Sake o Kumikawasu" (酒を酌み交わす) | Munehisa Sakai | Shigeru Murakoshi | Munehisa Sakai | June 26, 2026 |
Tetsuo boards Yukio while Nadare merges with Hercules' remains and they continue their battle. Sagami manages to sneak up on Nadare and shoot her in the head, but she responds by cutting him in half. However, this distracts her long enough for Tetsuo to get close and kill her. With his dying breath, Sagami begs Tetsuo to save the Earth and protect his students. Upon returning to the Mall, both Tetsuo and Yukio are celebrated as heroes, and Hagane reveals nobody in the Mall has died. The next day, Tetsuo shows signs of frostbite on his ears, so Hagane takes him to see the Boss, who is also the Mall's doctor. Along the way, they visit Ao, who is recovering from her wounds. They also find Yukio guarding the VIERDE members. They eventually track down the Boss at the Mall's graveyard, and she quickly treats Tetsuo's wounds, telling him that she plans to evacuate the Mall once Land of Men recovers, since the humanoid variant kaiju likely knows the location of the Mall now. That night, the Mall hosts a victory banquet for Tetsuo. Afterwards, Tetsuo leaves to sleep inside Yukio's cockpit.

== Reception ==
By September 2026, the manga had over one million copies in circulation. The manga was recommended by animator and director Hideaki Anno, video game creator Hideo Kojima, and manga artist One.
