= You Can't Bluff the Sharp-Eyed Sister =

Japanese light novel series

- First light novel volume cover

聖女に嘘は通じない (Seijo ni Uso wa Tsūjinai)
- Genre: Fantasy, mystery
- Light novel
- Written by: Hyūganatsu
- Illustrated by: Chiho Shinishi
- Published by: Frontier Works
- Imprint: ArianRose
- Original run: May 12, 2022 – present
- Volumes: 2
- Manga
- Written by: Hyūganatsu
- Illustrated by: Yo Asami
- Published by: Kodansha
- English publisher: NA: Kodansha USA
- Imprint: Monthly Shōnen Magazine Comics
- Magazine: Monthly Shōnen Magazine
- Original run: March 6, 2023 – present
- Volumes: 7

You Can't Bluff The Sharp Eyed Sister (Japanese: 聖女に嘘は通じない, Hepburn: Seijo ni Uso wa Tsūjinai) is a Japanese light novel series written by Hyūganatsu and illustrated by Chiho Shinishi. It began publication by Frontier Works under its ArianRose imprint in May 2022. A manga adaptation illustrated by Yo Asami began serialization in Kodansha's Monthly Shōnen Magazine in March 2023.

== Plot ==
The plot is about a priestess called Chloe, who moonlights as a gambler. She is called by the captain of the holy knights, Erald, to solve a murder that happened two years ago and threatens the stability of the kingdom.

== Media ==
=== Light novel ===
Written by Hyūganatsu and illustrated by Chiho Shinishi, the light novel series began publication by Frontier Works under its ArianRose imprint on May 12, 2022.

| No. | Release date | ISBN |
|---|---|---|
| 1 | May 12, 2022 | 978-4-86657-545-2 |
| 2 | January 9, 2026 | 978-4-86657-908-5 |

=== Manga ===
A manga adaptation illustrated by Yo Asami began serialization in Kodansha's Monthly Shōnen Magazine on March 6, 2023. The manga ended its first part on June 10, 2025, and the second part began on October 6, 2025. In October 2024, Kodansha USA announced that they licensed the manga adaptation for English publication.

| No. | Original release date | Original ISBN | English release date | English ISBN |
|---|---|---|---|---|
| 1 | September 29, 2023 | 978-4-06-532812-5 | October 25, 2025 | 979-8-89-478733-6 (digital); 979-8-88-877584-4 (print) |
| 2 | March 19, 2024 | 978-4-06-533998-5 | December 23, 2025 (digital); January 13, 2026 (print) | 979-8-89-478795-4 (digital); 979-8-88-877585-1 (print) |
| 3 | August 16, 2024 | 978-4-06-536091-0 | February 24, 2026 | 979-8-89-478888-3 (digital); 979-8-88-877586-8 (print) |
| 4 | February 17, 2025 | 978-4-06-537781-9 | April 28, 2026 (digital); June 2, 2026 (print) | 979-8-89-830064-7 (digital); 979-8-88-877633-9 (print) |
| 5 | September 17, 2025 | 978-4-06-540116-3 | September 29, 2026 | 979-8-89-830239-9 (digital); 979-8-88-877901-9 (print) |
| 6 | June 17, 2026 | 978-4-06-543526-7 | — | — |
| 7 | November 6, 2026 | 978-4-06-545247-9 | — | — |

== Reception ==
In two reviews for the first volume from Anime News Network, Caitlin Moore gave the first volume of the manga four stars out of five, and Erica Friedman gave it a full five stars.
