= Hyūganatsu (writer) =

Pseudonymous Japanese novelist

- Occupation: Novelist
- Writing career
- Pen name: Hyūganatsu (日向夏), Uribō (うりぼう)
- Language: Japanese
- Period: 2011–present
- Notable work: The Apothecary Diaries

Hyūganatsu (Japanese: 日向夏, Hepburn: Hyūganatsu) is a pseudonymous Japanese novelist. Her debut novel and representative work, The Apothecary Diaries, has been adapted into a novel, a light novel series, multiple manga series, and a TV anime.

== Biography ==
She was born in Fukuoka Prefecture and currently resides there.

Hyūganatsu first published The Apothecary Diaries under the pen name Uribō (うりぼう, lit. 'wild boar piglet') on the novel submission website Shōsetsuka ni Narō in 2011. At the suggestion of her editor, she then changed her pen name to Hyūganatsu, the name of her favorite fruit (hyūganatsu). She confirmed that it is rendered as a single word, "Hyūganatsu", rather than as "Hyūga Natsu", with no distinction made between a given name and a family name.

Hyūganatsu does not show her face in public. For fan events, she dresses in a boar costume based on her online avatar, Uririn (うりりん).

== Works ==
=== Novels ===
- The Apothecary Diaries (薬屋のひとりごと, Kusuriya no Hitorigoto)
  - (2012, RayBooks; ISBN 978-4-072853-79-5) – only published 1 volume, "Harem"
  - (2014–present, Hero Bunko) – 16 volumes published so far
- King of Tonelico (トネリコの王, Toneriko no Ō) (2013–2014, Hero Bunko) – 2 volumes total
- Hiō Senka: Itsuwari Sennyo wa Kōsoku-chū (緋凰仙華 いつわり仙女は拘束中) (2013, Ichijinsha Bunko Iris; ISBN 978-4-7580-4492-9) – 1 volume total
- Rojiura no Seirei-hime (路地裏の精霊姫) (2014, Ichijinsha Bunko Iris; ISBN 978-4-7580-4650-3) – 1 volume total
- Kurimiko Ayakashi Yobanashi (繰り巫女あやかし夜噺) (2016–2018, Mynavi Shuppan Fan Bunko) – 2 volumes total
- Karorī wa Hiite Kudasai! ~Gakushoku Gāru to Manpuku Danshi~ (カロリーは引いてください! 〜学食ガールと満腹男子〜) (2017, Fujimi L Bunko; ISBN 978-4-04-072286-3) – 1 volume total
- Nazotoki Iseki Hakkutsubu (なぞとき遺跡発掘部) (2018–2019, Shogakukan Bunko Charabun!) – 3 volumes total
- Zegenya Guen (女衒屋グエン) (2018, Seikaisha FICTIONS; ISBN 978-4-06-513110-7) – 1 volume total
- Requirements for a "Crack" Detective (迷探偵の条件, Meitantei no Jōken) (2021–present, MF Bunko J) – 1 volume published so far
- The Son of the Immortal King (不死王の息子, Fushiō no Musuko) (2021–present, Hero Bunko) – 1 volume published so far
- The Failure at God School (神さま学校の落ちこぼれ, Kami-sama Gakkō no Ochikobore) (2022–present, Seikaisha Fictions) – 5 volumes published so far
- You Can't Bluff the Sharp-Eyed Sister (聖女に嘘は通じない, Seijo ni Uso wa Tsūjanai) (2022–present, ArianRose) – 2 volumes published so far

=== Anthologies ===
- Meshitero: Mayonaka ni Yomenai Nijūnin no Oishii Monogatari (飯テロ 真夜中に読めない20人の美味しい物語) (2017, Fujimi L Bunko; ISBN 978-4-04-072535-2) – contributed Karorī wa Hiite Kudasai! (カロリーは引いてください!)
- Fate/Grand Order Mystery Novel Anthology: Chaldea Case Files file.02 (FGOミステリー小説アンソロジー カルデアの事件簿 file.02, FGO Misuterī Shōsetsu Ansorojī Karudea no Jikenbo file.02) (2020, Seikaisha FICTIONS; ISBN 978-4-06-518468-4) – contributed Misshitsu Yūkaku (密室遊郭)
- Yofuke no Otsumami (夜更けのおつまみ) (2020, Poplar Bunko; ISBN 978-4-591-16634-5) – contributed Hitori Izakaya no Susume (一人居酒屋のすすめ)
- Sakka Tōbōmeshi (作家逃亡飯) (2020, Seikaisha FICTIONS; ISBN 978-4-06-519944-2) – contributed Isekai to Hitchihaiku: Hyūganatsu no Boai (異世界とヒッチハイク ヒュウガナツの場合)
- Suteihōmu no Misshutsu Satsujin 2: Korona Jidai no Misuterī Shōsetsu Ansorojī (ステイホームの密室殺人2 コロナ時代のミステリー小説アンソロジー) (2020, Seikaisha FICTIONS; ISBN 978-4-06-520914-1) – contributed Meiwakuna Satsujinsha (迷惑な殺人者)
- Kodomo Noberu Purojekuto (こどもノベル・プロジェクト) (2020, Hero Bunko Official Website) – contributed Hataraku Panda (はたらくパンダ)

=== Reading dramas ===
- Tsuioku no Mamu (追憶のマム) (2020, PLATTO) – scriptwriter

=== Manga ===
- The Apothecary Diaries (薬屋のひとりごと, Kusuriya no Hitorigoto) (2017–present, Square Enix) – 38 volumes published so far
- The Apothecary Diaries: Maomao's Notes from the Inner Palace (薬屋のひとりごと～猫猫の後宮謎解き手帳～, Kusuriya no Hitorigoto: Maomao no Kōkyū Nazotoki Techō) (2017–present, Shogakukan) – 20 volumes published so far
- The Failure at God School (神さま学校の落ちこぼれ, Kami-sama Gakkō no Ochikobore) (2021–present, Hakusensha) – 15 volumes published so far
- You Can't Bluff the Sharp-Eyed Sister (聖女に嘘は通じない, Seijo ni Uso wa Tsūjanai) (2023–present, Kodansha) – 7 volumes published so far
