= List of Zombie Land Saga episodes =

Zombie Land Saga is an anime television series produced by MAPPA, Avex Pictures and Cygames. Announced in July 2018, the series is directed by Munehisa Sakai and written by Shigeru Murakoshi, with animation by studio MAPPA. The series' character designs are provided by Kasumi Fukagawa, Kazuo Ogura is the art director, Takashi Yanagida is serving as director of photography, Azusa Sasaki is the color designer, and Masahiro Goto is editing the series. Yasuharu Takanashi is composing the series' music, which is produced by Avex Pictures, while dugout is producing the sound. The opening and ending theme songs respectively are "Adabana Necromancy" (徒花ネクロマンシー, Adabana Nekuromanshī; lit. "Fruitless Necromancy") and "Hikari e" (光へ; lit. "To the Light"), both performed by Franchouchou (Sakura Minamoto (Kaede Hondo / Brina Palencia), Saki Nikaido (Asami Tano / Caitlin Glass), Ai Mizuno (Risa Taneda / Bryn Apprill), Junko Konno (Maki Kawase / Amanda Lee), Yugiri (Rika Kinugawa / Stephanie Young), and Lily Hoshikawa (Minami Tanaka / Sarah Wiedenheft)). The 12-episode series aired between October 4 and December 20, 2018, and was broadcast on AT-X, Tokyo MX, Sun TV, BS11, Saga TV, and TVQ. The series was simulcast outside of Asia with Japanese audio and English subtitles by Crunchyroll and with English audio by Funimation. An uncut version of the dub that translates the main songs from the anime series was eventually released by Funimation at the end of 2019.

Medialink licensed the first season in Asia-Pacific, and streamed it on Netflix, Aniplus Asia, and Bilibili, while Muse Communication holds the distribution rights to the second season.

The opening and ending themes were both released as singles paired with "FANTASTIC LOVERS" and "Jellyfish" (respectively, both sung by Iron Frill, Ai Mizuno's in-universe pre-Franchouchou idol group) on November 28, 2018, and they charted at #13 and #19 (respectively) in the Oricon Singles Chart on December 10, while the opening theme single topped the Billboard Japan Download Songs chart on the same day.

On July 27, 2019, it was announced that the series is getting renewed for a second season, titled Zombie Land Saga Revenge. On February 27, 2021, it was revealed that MAPPA would animate the new season, which aired from on April 8 to June 24, 2021, on AT-X and other channels. Tatsuro Onishi and Momoko Mifune replace Kazuo Ogura and Takashi Yanagida as art director and director of photography. The remaining cast and staff return to reprise their roles. The opening and ending theme songs respectively are "Taiga yo Tomo ni Naite Kure" (大河よ共に泣いてくれ; lit. "O Saga, Cry With Me") and "Yume o Te ni, Modoreru Basho mo Nai Hibi o" (夢を手に、戻れる場所もない日々を; lit. "Spending The Days With a Dream and Nowhere to Go Home"), both performed by Franchouchou. Crunchyroll streamed the series with subtitles, and Funimation stream the series dubbed in English.

On October 17, 2021, it was announced that the series would be receiving an anime film project. The film, titled Zombie Land Saga: Yumeginga Paradise, was released on October 24, 2025.

== Series overview ==
Season	Episodes	Originally released	
Season	Episodes	First released	Last released
1	12	October 4, 2018	December 20, 2018
2	12	April 8, 2021	June 24, 2021

== Episodes ==
=== Zombie Land Saga (2018) ===
No. overall	No. in season	Title	Directed by (Note: Information is taken from the ending credits of each episode.)	Written by	Original release date
1	1	"Good Morning SAGA"; Transliteration: "Guddo Mōningu SAGA" (Japanese: グッドモーニング SAGA)	Munehisa Sakai & Takeru Satō	Shigeru Murakoshi	October 4, 2018
Sakura Minamoto, a high school girl with aspirations of becoming an idol, is suddenly hit by a truck. She awakens with amnesia in a zombie-filled mansion in Saga Prefecture, discovering that she has become a zombie herself when she is shot by a frightened police officer after trying to escape. A man named Kotaro Tatsumi explains that he resurrected Sakura, who has been dead for ten years, along with several other girls from various eras to form an idol group and revitalize Saga. Needing stimulation to awaken the other girls from their braindead state, Kotaro brings the zombies to perform in a death metal concert at the Saga Live House Geils. Despite Sakura's doubts, the other zombies instinctively react to the music and make it through the performance through screaming and headbanging alone, during which Sakura recalls some of her memories from when she was alive. Although the performance ultimately ends in disaster, almost all of the other zombies regain their senses the next day.
2	2	"I♡HIPHOP SAGA"	Takafumi Ishida	Shigeru Murakoshi	October 11, 2018
Displeased with their situation, experienced idols Ai Mizuno and Junko Konno attempt to leave the mansion, prompting a worried Sakura to follow after them. The zombies try to evade a group of rappers trying to hit on them, only to encounter the same policeman from before and run back to the mansion after being shot at again. The next day, the zombies put on a show at Saga Castle, in which they nearly break their masquerade as regular humans when Tae Yamada – the only zombie yet to regain her senses – is accidentally decapitated on stage. Sakura gets into an argument with her rebellious bandmate Saki Nikaido over Tae's head, which escalates into a rap battle and convinces the audience that the fiasco is part of their act. Impressed by Sakura's "guts", Saki decides to take her new idol career more seriously.
3	3	"DEAD OR LIVE SAGA"	Tatsufumi Itō	Takuya Masumoto	October 18, 2018
As Kotaro makes plans for a live flash mob performance in front of Karatsu Station, the zombies try to decide on a name for their group; they ultimately settle on the name "Franchouchou" after the sound of Tae's sneezing, with Saki appointing herself as the group's leader. While the others motivate themselves to practice their routine overnight, Ai and Junko remain skeptical, leading the others to begin the performance without them. The performance falters after Sakura forgets her lyrics, but Ai and Junko step in to salvage the show, managing to attract a sole young girl as a fan. After Sakura thanks Ai for her and Junko's help later that night, Ai contemplates starting her idol career over in Franchouchou.
4	4	"Warming Dead SAGA"; Transliteration: "Wōmingu Deddo SAGA" (Japanese: ウォーミング・デッド SAGA)	Hisatoshi Shimizu & Takeru Satō	Shigeru Murakoshi	October 25, 2018
With their budget running out, Kotaro sends the zombies to perform at a hot spring resort in Ureshino to earn a sponsorship deal with a pharmaceutical company. After taking a sightseeing tour and discussing their goals as idols, the zombies discover that the skin patches they are promoting are effective at loosening their stiffened muscles, which they use to good effect during their performance. Later that night, Sakura, Saki, and Junko sneak into the hot springs against Kotaro's instructions, only to be spotted out of their human disguises by the pharmaceutical company's president, terrifying her and resulting in Franchouchou losing the sponsorship deal.
5	5	"The Nice Bird SAGA in Your Heart"; Transliteration: "Kimi no Kokoro ni Naisu Bādo SAGA" (Japanese: 君の心にナイスバード SAGA)	Takeru Satō	Takuya Masumoto	November 1, 2018
To raise their profile, Franchouchou performs in a commercial for the fried chicken restaurant Drive-In Tori in Imari, which is edited with footage of Tae attempting to devour the company's mascot. Later, the zombies participate in the Kashima Gatalympics while wearing promotional Franchouchou T-shirts as a publicity stunt. However, they are forced to remain covered in mud when they accidentally wash their human makeup off after the first round, which obscures their shirts. They attempt to win the next round to advertise themselves on the victory podium, but only the unintelligible Tae succeeds in getting first prize. Sakura suddenly remembers giving her a spare shirt and tells her to remove her muddy clothes, only to discover that the clean shirt underneath is actually for Drive-In Tori. Meanwhile, a journalist in attendance named Arata Okoba recognizes Junko after viewing the Drive-In Tori commercial and decides to investigate her.
6	6	"Because It's Sentimental SAGA"; Transliteration: "Datte Senchimentaru SAGA" (Japanese: だってセンチメンタル SAGA)	Yasunori Gotō	Shigeru Murakoshi	November 8, 2018
As Franchouchou hold a photo-op session with a small group of fans, Ai and Junko clash with each other over their different opinions on how idols should interact with their fans. Sakura hears from Junko about how hard she tried to become an idol in life, only to die in a plane crash before her first tour in Kyushu; feeling her outdated mindset on idols is hindering her bandmates, Junko contemplates leaving Franchouchou. Meanwhile, Saki learns from Ai about how her death from a lightning strike during an outdoor concert at Tosu Stadium left her with a fear of lightning and a determination not to be overshadowed by her own death. The next day, Kotaro announces that Franchouchou will be a part of the Saga Rock Festival, where Ai and Junko are to perform a duet, causing the group to feel uneasy.
7	7	"But It's Zombiemental SAGA"; Transliteration: "Keredo Zonbimentaru SAGA" (Japanese: けれどゾンビメンタル SAGA)	Hisatoshi Shimizu, Takeru Satō, Kōnosuke Uda & Munehisa Sakai	Shigeru Murakoshi	November 15, 2018
Junko refuses to practice for Franchouchou's Saga Rock performance and locks herself away, forcing Ai to cover her portion of their duet. On the day before the show, Kotaro assures Junko that she does not need to follow the modern standards of the idol industry, convincing her to rejoin the group. When a thunderstorm strikes during their performance, Ai breaks down on stage and struggles to sing, but recovers when Junko lends her support. In the middle of their song, the zombies are struck by lightning, which illuminates their bodies and electrically filters their voices. The audience and media are impressed by these effects, and Franchouchou are reported as Saga Rock's breakout idol group.
8	8	"Go Go Neverland SAGA"; Transliteration: "GOGO Nebārando SAGA" (Japanese: GOGO ネバーランド SAGA)	Takafumi Ishida	Shigeru Murakoshi	November 22, 2018
As Franchouchou enjoy a string of new gigs and events, a large man named Takeo Go comes to one of their events after recognizing child star Lily Hoshikawa. Lily reveals that the man is her father and former manager, that she formerly had the masculine name named Masao Go, and that she died from the shock of growing facial hair during her stressful television career. Realizing how much Takeo cared for Lily, Franchouchou invites Takeo to a special concert where Lily performs a song to give him a proper goodbye.
9	9	"Though My Life May Have Ended Once By Some Twist of Fate I Have Risen, and If Song and Dance Are to Be My Fate, Then Carrying the Memories of My Comrades In My Heart As I Sally Forth Shall Be My SAGA"; Transliteration: "Ichido wa Tsukita Kono Inochi, Nan no Inga ka Yomigaeri, Utai Odoru ga Sadame Nara, Tomo e no Omoi o Mune ni Hime, Tsuranuku Made yo Onore no SAGA" (Japanese: 一度は尽きたこの命 なんの因果か蘇り 歌い踊るが宿命なら 親友への想いを胸に秘め 貫くまでよ己の SAGA)	Takeru Satō	Takuya Masumoto	November 29, 2018
Saki stops a public altercation between Franchouchou and the remnants of her former biker gang, Dorami, whose current leader, Maria Amabuki, is challenged by the rival gang Korosuke to a chicken race towards a cliff at Mt. Kagami. Maria accepts the challenge in defiance of her mother, Saki's friend and former Dorami boss Reiko Kirishima, who retired from the gang for a normal married life following Saki's death during an identical race in 1997. Learning of the challenge, Saki takes Maria's place using Reiko's motorcycle, which she destroys in an explosion after jumping over the cliff a second time. After Saki returns unscathed, Reiko punches and scolds her for her recklessness, regaining Maria's respect. Saki and the rest of Franchouchou celebrate Reiko and Maria's reconciliation by performing an idol concert for both gangs.
10	10	"NO ZOMBIE NO IDOL SAGA"	Yasunori Gotō	Takuya Masumoto	December 6, 2018
Franchouchou are scheduled to hold a concert at local performance venue Arpino, which Sakura feels may be a clue to regaining her memories. When the zombies are sent to the mountains as part of their training, Sakura becomes annoyed that everyone is more focused on wilderness survival than practicing for the show. As things start to become more awkward between Sakura and the others, she observes the others' teamwork and realizes she was acting selfishly. A week before the concert, Sakura gets hit by a truck again, causing her memories to revert to when she was still alive.
11	11	"A One-Of-A-Kind SAGA"; Transliteration: "Sekai ni Hitotsu Dake no SAGA" (Japanese: 世界にひとつだけの SAGA)	Kōnosuke Uda	Shigeru Murakoshi	December 13, 2018
Losing her memories of being a zombie on top of regaining her old ones, Sakura is left with a pessimistic belief that she can't make it as an idol. After the others fail to reason with her, Sakura leaves the house, recalling how every attempt at trying hard at something in life led to something going wrong, including her death. Despite Sakura's negativity, Kotaro remains determined not to give up on her.
12	12	"Good Morning Again SAGA"; Transliteration: "Guddo Mōningu Agein SAGA" (Japanese: グッドモーニング アゲイン SAGA)	Munehisa Sakai & Hisatoshi Shimizu	Shigeru Murakoshi	December 20, 2018
With Sakura remaining defiant as the show draws closer, Tae grows particularly frustrated and attempts to scold Sakura out of inaction. Tae is unable to adequately convey her message but her actions move Yugiri and Ai out of their passive treatment of Sakura and together succeed in convincing Sakura to rejoin the group's rehearsal, regardless of their chances of success. On the day of the concert, heavy snowfall causes the venue to collapse and wreck the stage, but the zombies continue their performance regardless, encouraging Sakura to do the same. Together, they manage to give a successful performance, with Sakura regaining her full memories in the process. Afterwards, Okoba notices a connection between Ai, Junko, and Lily and the people they were in life.

=== Zombie Land Saga Revenge (2021) ===
No. overall	No. in season	Title	Directed by	Written by	Original release date (Note: Episodes are released on Amazon Prime Video Japan every Thursday at 11:15 p.m. JST, 15 minutes before the original air time on AT-X.)
13	1	"Good Morning Returns SAGA"; Transliteration: "Guddo Mōningu Ritānzu SAGA" (Japanese: グッドモーニングリターンズ SAGA)	Munehisa Sakai	Shigeru Murakoshi	April 8, 2021
One month after Franchouchou's show at the Arpino, the group's success plummets when their performance at the Ekimae Fudōsan Stadium disastrously bombs, leaving the group ¥20 million in debt. The girls spend the following months working at various jobs across Saga to cover expenses, while Kotaro abandons his efforts to save Saga and falls into a slump, despite the girls' repeated attempts to motivate him. Believing their success to depend on Kotaro, Franchouchou books another performance at the Saga Live House Geils, where they intend to unveil a new song that Kotaro had prepared for their previous show as an encore. However, Sakura fails to persuade him to attend, forcing them to continue the show without him. Kotaro is confronted by the bartender of Bar New Jofuku, who reminds him of his reasons to support the girls. Although Kotaro arrives at Geils in time to call for the encore, the song receives a tepid response from the audience, resulting in the show's complete failure. The next morning, a fully revitalized Kotaro greets the girls to help them relaunch their careers.
14	2	"The SAGA of an Almost-Broken Radio"; Transliteration: "Bukkowarekake no Redio SAGA" (Japanese: ぶっ壊れかけのレディオ SAGA)	Takafumi Ishida	Shigeru Murakoshi	April 15, 2021
Franchouchou makes a live televised appearance to promote Yūtoku Inari Shrine alongside White Ryu, an aging radio talk show host whom Saki admires. After filming, Ryu tells Saki that he intends to retire soon, which she interprets to mean the end of his show. Confiding in Sakura that Ryu helped her find direction in her life that led to her befriending Reiko, Saki appears on his show as a self-imposed guest and pleads for him to continue inspiring Saga's citizens. However, he explains that he has already decided to appoint Franchouchou as the show's new hosts. Saki enthusiastically accepts and confesses her love for Ryu, but he does not reciprocate her feelings on account of their age discrepancy. Saki later cries together with Sakura, realizing her own inability to enter a relationship with anyone due to being an unaging zombie.
15	3	"The Acoustic SAGA of Love and Youth"; Transliteration: "Ai to Seishun no Akōsutikku SAGA" (Japanese: 愛と青春のアコースティック SAGA)	Yasutomo Okamoto	Kiyoko Yoshimura	April 22, 2021
Kotaro schedules Franchouchou to perform at the new Saga Arena's inauguration as the opening act for Iron Frill, Ai's original idol group; to Ai's chagrin, he withholds her from the show to reduce the risk of her being recognized as a former member. Ai entrusts Junko with looking after the group while she focuses on a string of solo acts to help cover the group's debt. However, Junko harbors insecurities about repeating their previous failure, and struggles to advise the other girls as they brainstorm ways to impress the audience. After discovering Junko's feelings through a guitar song that she plays in private, Sakura suggests that they consult Ai over their ideas. When the two go to meet her, they find her talking with Iron Frill's current lead singer, Shiori, who invites Ai to join Iron Frill and abandon Franchouchou, further diminishing Junko's self-confidence.
16	4	"Pure-Hearted Electric SAGA"; Transliteration: "Junjō Erekutorikku SAGA" (Japanese: 純情エレクトリック SAGA)	Takeru Satō	Kiyoko Yoshimura	April 29, 2021
Sakura and Junko agree to hide Ai's conversation with Shiori from the other girls, but Junko remains distracted by her own fears that Ai will accept Shiori's offer. Noticing this, Kotaro emboldens Junko by loaning his electric guitar to her, telling her to use it to "smash" through her insecurities. On the day of the performance, Junko leads Franchouchou in a successful heavy metal number that ends with her literally smashing Kotaro's guitar; impressed by Junko's newfound resolve, Ai reunites with Franchouchou on stage and performs an encore with them, using electrified vocal and visual effects from the broken guitar. Shiori attempts to recruit Ai again afterwards, but Junko and the other girls assert Ai as a member of Franchouchou. During a post-tour live interview, Shiori publicly acknowledges Franchouchou's talent and declares them to be Iron Frill's rivals.
17	5	"Little Bodda Bope SAGA"; Transliteration: "Ritoru Parappo SAGA" (Japanese: リトルパラッポ SAGA)	Yasunori Gotō & Takafumi Ishida	Kiyoko Yoshimura	May 6, 2021
Lily decides to mark Franchouchou's national television debut by competing in the reality talent show Japanese Got Performance. One of the other competitors at the preliminaries is Light Oozora, a fellow child actor who condescendingly believes that he will secure an easy victory, and scorns Lily's obsession with maintaining her cute, childish image. Both Lily and Light advance to the finals, where Light performs the same song that Lily intends to sing. Inspired by the rest of Franchouchou's support, Lily reworks her piece into a scat rendition that captivates Light and the audience's younger members. Although Light is declared the winner, he feels outperformed by Lily's last-minute improvisational skills, but Lily encourages him to be proud of his achievements and parts with him on friendly terms. Following the show, Lily's performance becomes a cultural phenomenon.
18	6	"Walking Bet SAGA"; Transliteration: "Wōkingu Betto SAGA" (Japanese: ウォーキング・ベット SAGA)	Takahiro Kaneko	Shigeru Murakoshi	May 13, 2021
Tae is sent to run errands while the rest of Franchouchou continues to work off their debt; she is secretly tracked throughout the day by Okoba, who determines her to be the most suspicious member of the group due to her bizarre mannerisms. Maria, who works at the supermarket where Tae arrives, invites Tae to watch Dorami perform at a dancing competition. Tae enters the competition in another attempt to devour Drive-In Tori's mascot, the reigning champion, and defeats him in a dance-off, winning ¥30,000. When Tae attempts to give Maria the winnings despite Maria's protests, the policeman helps them settle the dispute by allowing Tae to bet the money at a boat race. Tae unwittingly bets on Misa Azumatsuru, Maria's rival and erstwhile captain of Korosuke, by sucking on a marker and sneezing ink over her betting ticket; Misa subsequently wins the race, earning Tae ¥20 million due to Misa's low chances of success. Tae returns home to show the money to Franchouchou, who realize that their debt is now fully covered; in the process, Sakura accidentally decapitates Tae in front of Okoba, exposing their secret to him.
19	7	"Maimai Revolution SAGA"; Transliteration: "Maimai Reboryūshon SAGA" (Japanese: マイマイレボリューション SAGA)	Yasutomo Okamoto	Shigeru Murakoshi	May 20, 2021
Maimai Yuzuriha, a fan of Franchouchou, seemingly dies when she blunders into the men's bath at the local public bathhouse and slips on a bar of soap dropped by Kotaro. Awakening after Kotaro brings her to the mansion to be resurrected, she is revealed to have simply been unconscious, and discovers the girls' undead status. Unfazed by her discovery and determined to emulate her idols' success, Maimai convinces Kotaro to let her join Franchouchou so she can help keep their secret. The group grows to accept Maimai despite her inexperience, and agrees to her suggestion of performing at her school's cultural festival, where they plan to unveil her as their eighth member. During the preparations, Maimai learns about Sakura's life when she was alive and realizes that everyone in Franchouchou sees the group as a second chance at life due to their untimely deaths. Concluding that she does not belong, Maimai announces her graduation from the group after their first performance together so she can live her life to the fullest. Meanwhile, Okoba has determined the identities of everyone in Franchouchou except for Yugiri.
20	8	"The Saga Incident, Part 1"; Transliteration: "Saga Jihen Sono Ichi" (Japanese: 佐賀事変 其ノ壱)	Takafumi Ishida & Kōnosuke Uda	Kiyoko Yoshimura	May 27, 2021
In Meiji Era Japan, Yugiri, an oiran in Yoshiwara, has her freedom bought by a wealthy patron after her popularity drives her price so high that no one can afford her. She moves with him to the former location of Saga Prefecture, which has been absorbed into Nagasaki following the Saga Rebellion of 1874. Her patron soon dies, leaving her alone in an unfamiliar place. One day, she happens upon Kiichi Momozaki, a local young man who is determined to restore Saga's status as an independent prefecture. Kiichi becomes smitten with Yugiri and later visits her to offer a gift, which Yugiri accepts. While visiting Kiichi to repay him, Yugiri learns that Kiichi is working to save Saga out of gratitude to the old man who took Kiichi in after his father died in the uprising, and is inspired to assist him. Kiichi's friend, Itou, learns of their collaboration and advises them against continuing their efforts, believing another war to be inevitable. Later, Kiichi's campaign attracts the attention of a group of former samurai.
21	9	"The Saga Incident, Part Two"; Transliteration: "Saga Jihen Sono Ni" (Japanese: 佐賀事変 其ノ弐)	Takeru Satō	Kiyoko Yoshimura	June 3, 2021
The recruited ex-samurai begin planning an attack on Nagasaki against Kiichi's wishes, which distresses Kiichi when they reveal their intentions to him. Learning of the upcoming insurrection from an informant, Itou requests that Yugiri leave Saga with Kiichi for their own safety; having anticipated this, Yugiri sends letters to powerful connections in the Meiji government entreating them to grant protection to Kiichi. That evening, Itou kills the insurrectionists before they can carry out their attack, but is witnessed by Kiichi and reluctantly attempts to silence him, revealing himself to be a government assassin. Yugiri defends Kiichi and helps him evade the police, encouraging his resolve to save Saga despite his remorse for causing the incident. She then duels Itou, who allows himself to be killed out of respect for Kiichi's ideals. After Yugiri is privately executed for Itou's death, Kiichi reaches Nagasaki and eventually succeeds in appealing for Saga's independence. In the present day, the undead Yugiri visits the immortal old man, who has become the bartender of Bar New Jofuku, and the two muse over the new Saga that Kiichi has helped create.
22	10	"The SAGA of How These Zombies Will Get Their Revenge"; Transliteration: "Zonbi-tachi wa Dō Fukushū Suru no ka SAGA" (Japanese: ゾンビたちはどう復讐するのか SAGA)	Hisatoshi Shimizu	Shigeru Murakoshi	June 10, 2021
Three weeks after the Arpino concert in 2019, Kotaro announces his plans for the concert at the Ekimae Fudōsan Stadium, which ends in failure due to his poor management. Left in debt, the girls' confidence is restored when Tae successfully purchases food with Kotaro's savings using poorly self-applied makeup, inspiring them to strive towards a "revenge" concert. In 2020, Kotaro schedules the concert to occur at the stadium on the anniversary of the previous one, taking precautions to prevent a repeat of the disaster. Okoba confronts Kotaro with evidence of the girls' secret, threatening to expose his exploitation of the dead to the public. Kotaro speaks with the bartender that night, during which it is revealed that Kotaro resurrected the girls to preserve Saga's memory in the aftermath of a prophesied cataclysm. The cataclysm begins the instant Okoba attempts to publish his exposé, with Saga experiencing a sudden prefecture-wide blackout from a severe rainstorm that sends the girls' mansion sliding down towards the sea.
23	11	"All It Takes Is for You to Be There SAGA"; Transliteration: "Tatoeba Kimi ga Iru Dake de SAGA" (Japanese: たとえば君がいるだけで SAGA)	Kōnosuke Uda	Shigeru Murakoshi	June 17, 2021
Franchouchou's mansion drifts out to the shore of Hamasaki before collapsing, destroying their supplies and makeup. The girls are found by a coworker from Ai's part-time job, who takes them to a makeshift shelter for those who lost their homes and power in the storm. They are found by Okoba, who secretly observes them as they perform for the local children, slowly realizing that the girls are acting of their own volition. After several days, the last of the girls' makeup wears off, and they fail to disguise themselves when they make clay masks that shatter in front of their audience. However, the children do not believe they are really zombies and accept them anyway, moving the girls while allowing Okoba to understand Franchouchou's courage to perform with the constant risk of exposure. Meanwhile, Kotaro and the bartender are rescued from the flooded bar; while the bartender is hospitalized, Kotaro reunites with the girls and reapplies their makeup, telling them that their revenge concert is still on schedule to restore Saga's morale. Afterwards, Sakura thanks Kotaro for helping her achieve her dream, and Kotaro promises to continue supporting Franchouchou until they become world-famous.
24	12	"The Greatest SAGA in History"; Transliteration: "Shijō Saidai no SAGA" (Japanese: 史上最大の SAGA)	Munehisa Sakai	Shigeru Murakoshi	June 24, 2021
With Okoba's help, Kotaro convinces the governor of Saga to focus repair efforts around Tosu to enable public travel to Ekimae Fudōsan Stadium, arguing that Franchouchou's charity concert will assist in unifying Saga. Meanwhile, Saki gathers Franchouchou to promote the concert over their radio show, encouraging anyone who hears it to attend. On the day of the concert, Franchouchou arrives on foot at the stadium to find it seemingly empty until people from across Japan begin filling in, the girls' broadcast having gained international attention. The concert becomes a phenomenal success, with Saga's repairs going underway afterwards; before their encore performance, Kotaro tearfully congratulates the girls while reminding them that Saga has still yet to be saved, hiding stains of blood that he coughs up in the middle of crying. In a post-credits scene, a flying saucer appears and obliterates the landscape.

== Home video release ==
=== Japanese ===
Vol.	Episodes	Cover character(s)	Release date	Ref.
Season 1
1	1–4	Sakura Minamoto and Saki Nikaido	21 December 2018	
2	5–8	Ai Mizuno and Junko Konno	22 February 2019	
3	9–12	Yugiri, Lily Hoshikawa, and Tae Yamada	26 April 2019	
Season 2
1	13–16	Saki Nikaido, Ai Mizuno, and Junko Konno	25 June 2021	
2	17–20	Yugiri, Lily Hoshikawa, and Tae Yamada	30 July 2021	
3	21–24	Sakura Minamoto and Kotaro Tatsumi	27 August 2021	
