= Zombie Land Saga: Yumeginga Paradise =

2025 film by Takafumi Ishida and Takeru Satō

- Theatrical release poster
- Japanese: 劇場版「ゾンビランドサガ ゆめぎんがパラダイス」
- Revised Hepburn: Gekijōban Zonbi Rando Saga: Yumeginga Paradaisu
- Directed by: Kōnosuke Uda (Note: Credited as "Chief Director" (総監督, Sō Kantoku)); Takafumi Ishida; Takeru Satō
- Screenplay by: Shigeru Murakoshi
- Based on: Zombie Land Saga by Public Relation Section, Zombie Division
- Starring: Mamoru Miyano; Kaede Hondo; Asami Tano; Risa Taneda; Maki Kawase; Rika Kinugawa; Minami Tanaka; Kotono Mitsuishi
- Cinematography: Madoka Yagi
- Edited by: Mutsumi Takemiya
- Music by: Yasuharu Takanashi
- Production company: MAPPA
- Distributed by: Toei Company, Ltd.; Avex Pictures
- Release date: October 24, 2025
- Running time: 122 minutes
- Country: Japan
- Language: Japanese
- Box office: $191,002 (International box office revenue, excluding Mexico and Japan)

Zombie Land Saga: Yumeginga Paradise (Note: Japanese: 劇場版「ゾンビランドサガ ゆめぎんがパラダイス」, Hepburn: Gekijōban Zonbi Rando Saga: Yumeginga Paradaisu; lit. "Theatrical Feature Zombie Land Saga: Dream Galactic Paradise") is a 2025 Japanese animated comedy horror film co-directed by Takafumi Ishida and Takeru Satō with chief direction by Kōnosuke Uda, and written by Shigeru Murakoshi; the film is based on the Zombie Land Saga anime series by Public Relation Section, Zombie Division. Produced by MAPPA and distributed by Toei Company and Avex Pictures, Yumeginga Paradise takes place four years after the events of Zombie Land Saga Revenge, with Mamoru Miyano, Kaede Hondo, Asami Tano, Risa Taneda, Maki Kawase, Rika Kinugawa, Minami Tanaka and Kotono Mitsuishi reprising their respective roles from the television series. Yumeginga Paradise was released in Japan on October 24, 2025.

== Plot ==
Four years after their successful revenge concert at Ekimae Stadium, (Note: As depicted in the finale of Zombie Land Saga Revenge) idol group Franchouchou—consisting of the zombies Sakura Minamoto, Saki Nikaido, Ai Mizuno, Junko Konno, Yugiri, Lily Hoshikawa, and the feral Tae Yamada—is headlined as the official musical act for the Saga World Expo. While their manager, Kotaro Tatsumi, leaves for Tokyo to promote the event, Franchouchou participates in promotional events around Saga Prefecture. An unidentified flying object suddenly arrives to transmit its plan of invading Earth, before releasing energy beams to damage and destroy much of Saga's infrastructure.

While the prefecture's citizens and Franchouchou take shelter from the attacks, Tae is unwittingly abducted and brought aboard the mothership. Tae lingers around the ship while the aliens fail to notice her due to her corpse's lack of heat signature, and she reaches the core. Mistaking one of its power stones as ice cream, Tae swallows it, inadvertently disabling the beams and halting the mothership's attack. The power stone restores Tae's sanity and consciousness, giving her an opening to escape the mothership upon being detected.

Tae flies to Franchouchou's mansion and shocks the other members with her conscious personality. After subduing an alien with the help of Maria Amabuki, the group takes it to an observatory managed by Maria's father, Naomasa, and his scientist colleagues for research. Franchouchou learns of Tae's background as a protector of Saga, (Note: As depicted in the manga series Zombie Land Saga Sidestory: The First Zombie) while also learning of the government's plans to destroy the prefecture. The captured alien reawakens and gives chase before fleeing, exposing Sakura, Saki, Ai, Junko, Yugiri, and Lily as zombies to the humans. Tae calls Franchouchou weak and steps away. Tae and the humans later quietly move to a second safehouse and are narrowly saved by Franchouchou using themselves as decoys to distract the aliens.

As Franchouchou and the humans deliberate on their next move, Kotaro, who has returned from Tokyo, proposes a plan to raise ambient temperatures and noise to catch the aliens' attention using the materials intended for the Saga World Expo. The humans and Franchouchou reconcile their differences to enact the plan, as Kotaro and Tae privately discuss how Tae was able to be resurrected thanks to her own will. Franchouchou informs Saga's citizens of the plan, and they successfully coordinate the counterattack against the aliens at nightfall. Tae also infiltrates the mothership with a desire to sacrifice herself for Franchouchou.

Franchouchou catches up with Tae, despite the latter's protests. As the situation worsens with the aliens' increasing attacks, Franchouchou fights them off to reach the core. Tae finds the core cannot be overloaded without the power stone she swallowed. Tae orders Franchouchou to escape without her, though Sakura correctly deduces her intentions and stays. Tae apologizes for her previous behavior and regurgitates the stone to overload the core and destroy the mothership. Tae and Sakura safely reunite with Franchouchou and Kotaro, much to their joy.

Several weeks later, Saga is undergoing reconstruction and a Franchouchou concert is held to celebrate their victory over the aliens. Tae, who is fully aware that her consciousness is rapidly deteriorating since regurgitating the stone, joins Franchouchou onstage and voices her gratitude on being able to spend her limited time with the girls, wishing on meeting them in her full conscious state at another time. As the concert concludes, Tae reverts to her feral state and chews on her microphone, leaving the rest of Franchouchou laughing at the situation.

== Voice cast ==
Character	Japanese	English
Sakura Minamoto	Kaede Hondo	Brina Palencia
Saki Nikaido	Asami Tano	Caitlin Glass
Ai Mizuno	Risa Taneda	Bryn Apprill
Junko Konno	Maki Kawase	AmaLee
Yugiri	Rika Kinugawa	Stephanie Young
Lily Hoshikawa	Minami Tanaka	Sarah Wiedenheft
Tae Yamada	Kotono Mitsuishi	Dawn M. Bennett
Kotaro Tatsumi	Mamoru Miyano	Ricco Fajardo
Naomasa Amabuki	Daisuke Ono	Seth Magill

== Production ==
In October 2021, it was announced that a film adaptation for Zombie Land Saga was in production. In January 2025, it was revealed that the film was titled Yumeginga Paradise, with majority of the voice cast members from the television series reprising their roles in April of that year. Takafumi Ishida and Takeru Satō are directing the film at MAPPA with chief direction by Kōnosuke Uda, while Shigeru Murakoshi is returning to provide the screenplay, Jinshichi Yamaguchi is co-designing the characters with Fuminide Sai and Kasumi Fukagawa, and Yasuharu Takanashi also returning to compose the music from the television series. In July and October of that same year, two new songs from in-universe idol group Franchouchou were revealed, while Daisuke Ono was cast as Naomasa Amabuki.

== Release ==
The film was released in theaters in Japan on October 24, 2025, followed by Taiwan on December 24.

An English-language dub of the film was theatrically released in the United States and Canada on January 19, 2026 for one day only, by Crunchyroll via Sony Pictures Releasing.

The film was released via Sony Pictures Releasing International in Australia and New Zealand on January 22, 2026.

== Reception ==
=== Box office ===
The film ranked at number 8 in its opening weekend. The film has grossed over $191,002 worldwide.

=== Critical reception ===
Reuben Baron of Anime News Network gave the film a B− rating and stated, "Where the show knew how to balance its constant silly humor with effective dramatic beats, the movie sometimes finds itself in a more awkward tonal zone of being less funny while still too nonsensical to fully buy into the story."
