= Cayla Coats =

American voice actress and writer

- Education: University of Houston
- Occupations: Writer, poet
- Employers: Sentai Filmworks; Crunchyroll

Cayla Coats is an American voice actress and writer. She worked as editorial manager at Crunchyroll.

== Career ==
She graduated from the University of Houston's creative writing program. Coats worked as editorial manager at Crunchyroll, as well as a subtitler for Sentai Filmworks. She has provided voices in English dubs for several anime, including for Young Aoba and Nao Kuniyashi in DRAMAtical Murder.

== Personal life ==
Cayla Coats is a trans woman. Writing for Crunchyroll, she deemed the character Lily Hoshikawa from the series Zombie Land Saga as the "Best Girl" (female character in anime) of 2018, saying she related to the character as a trans woman.

== Filmography ==
=== Television animation ===
Title	Role
Akame ga Kill!	Additional voices
Black Bullet	Additional voices
Brynhildr in the Darkness	Student (episodes 1 and 3) Card Boy (episode 9) Kikako
Chaika: The Coffin Princess	Young Toru
DRAMAtical Murder	Nao, Young Aoba
Hamatora: The Animation	Additional voices
Hanayamata	Additional voices
Log Horizon	Hide & Seek Kid, Kid (episode 21)
Love, Chunibyo & Other Delusions	Raiden (episode 1) Tasty Lady (episode 2) Like; Girl (episode 4) Sleeper Toromi (episode 5) Squid Kid (episode 9)
Monthly Girls' Nozaki-kun	Fan Girl, Kashima Fanatic, Manga Drama, Zombie Girl (episode 12)
Muv-Luv Alternative: Total Eclipse	Kid (episode 1) Assorted Soldier (episodes 2 and 11) Racist Bully (episode 4)
No Game No Life	Young Sora (episode 9)
Nobunaga the Fool	Young Nobunaga (episode 17) Additional voices
Outbreak Company	Youngster (episode 2) Kiddo (episode 3) Elf (episodes 4-7, 11)
