= The Unaware Atelier Master =

Japanese light novel series

- First light novel volume cover, featuring Kurt (center), Yulicia (right) and Lieselotte (left)

勘違いの工房主～英雄パーティの元雑用係が、実は戦闘以外がSSSランクだったというよくある話～ (Kanchigai no Atorie Maisutā: Eiyū Pāti no Moto Zatsuyōgakari ga, Jitsu wa Sentō Igai ga SSS Ranku Datta to Iu Yoku Aru Hanashi)
- Genre: Fantasy
- Novel series
- Written by: Yōsuke Tokino
- Published by: AlphaPolis
- Original run: August 19, 2018 – present
- Light novel
- Written by: Yōsuke Tokino
- Illustrated by: Zounoze
- Published by: AlphaPolis
- Original run: March 31, 2019 – present
- Volumes: 12
- Manga
- Written by: Yōsuke Tokino
- Illustrated by: Naharu Furukawa
- Published by: AlphaPolis
- English publisher: Alpha Manga
- Original run: December 17, 2019 – present
- Volumes: 9
- Anime television series
- Directed by: Hisashi Ishii
- Written by: Deko Akao
- Music by: Harikemu Wata
- Studio: EMT Squared
- Licensed by: Crunchyroll
- Original network: Tokyo MX, ytv, BS NTV, AT-X
- Original run: April 6, 2025 – present
- Episodes: 12
- icon

The Unaware Atelier Master (Japanese: 勘違いの工房主～英雄パーティの元雑用係が、実は戦闘以外がSSSランクだったというよくある話～, Hepburn: Kanchigai no Atorie Maisutā: Eiyū Pāti no Moto Zatsuyōgakari ga, Jitsu wa Sentō Igai ga SSS Ranku Datta to Iu Yoku Aru Hanashi) is a Japanese light novel series written by Yōsuke Tokino and illustrated by Zounoze. Originally published online since August 2018, AlphaPolis has published twelve volumes of the series since March 2019. A manga adaptation illustrated by Naharu Furukawa began serialization online via AlphaPolis' manga website in December 2019 and has been collected in nine tankōbon volumes. The manga is published digitally in English through Alpha Manga. An anime television series adaptation produced by EMT Squared aired from April to June 2025. A second season has been announced.

== Plot ==
Kurt Rockhans, the 15-year-old "factotum" for the renowned Flaming Dragon Fang adventuring party, is unceremoniously dismissed by his party members because they wish to have a more "competent" party member into their ranks and therefore consider him disposable. Little did they know, his non-combat skills are more remarkable and powerful than they think. Now on his own and looking for paying work, he meets Yulishia, a former royal servant and new mine owner, and helps her out. After she takes notice of his incredible abilities (and developing a major crush on him), she takes up a friend's offer to open a new magical research and crafting atelier in a frontier town - which is later named Valha City - with Kurt serving as its unwitting chief artificer, an Atelier Master.

What Kurt is not aware of is that the atelier has been created to serve as bait for unknown forces who are attempting to kill Liselotte, the third princess of the kingdom of Homuross, whose existence provides an important link between two powerful nations. And so, Kurt is unknowingly drawn into a central role in a conflict which threatens to destroy the kingdom.

== Characters ==
=== Atelier members ===
Kurt Rockhans (クルト・ロックハンズ, Kuruto Rokkuhanzu)
Voiced by: Mikako Komatsu (Japanese); Ciarán Strange (English)
A former member of the Flaming Dragon Fang, who was kicked out after his group deemed him useless. Kurt is a kind and hardworking handyman from an isolated village named Hast in the Sheen Mountains. Despite his claim to be fifteen years old, time may pass differently for him and people in his village than for other humans, as a remark by his demon friend Hildegard indicates that he may actually be 1,200+ years old.
Although his combat abilities are subpar, Kurt tremendously outshines in non-combative tasks regardless of how difficult, finishing his work in a far shorter time with jaw-droppingly amazing results, phenomena which are apparently commonplace in his home village. Such abilities include making food that can heal injuries or undo curses, superhuman strength, mining abilities, creating powerful medicine, and cleaning skills that can remove even magic. He also unconsciously radiates a powerful magical aura which empowers or enhances everything he works on. However, he is incredibly naive and has very low self-esteem, which makes him a very easy target for anyone to manipulate him; and for unknown reasons, he has the tendency to lapse into a 24-hour long coma whenever someone praises him for his work and awake with no memory of said praise. After Yulicia and other high-ranking individuals in the kingdom notice his extraordinary qualities, they recruit him as the new Atelier Master for a magic artifacts workshop, but out of worry for his personal safety they keep him blissfully unaware of his important role, letting him assume he is instead a mere handyman.
Yulicia (ユーリシア, Yūrishia)
Voiced by: Asami Seto (Japanese); Erin Lundquist (English)
A beautiful white-haired, dark-skinned former adventurer and servant of the royal family who is also a direct descendant of the Warrior Maidens of Isisese Island. She inherited a mountain from her grandmother, and in need of proof of the mountain's mineral profitability in order to pay taxes, she hires Kurt as a temporary miner after he offers her his aid, after which he effortlessly discovers deposits of magical crystals and ores. As he continues to impress Yulicia with his skills, modesty and innocence, she falls in love with him and begins jealously protecting him against the unwanted (including romantic) attentions of other people, even developing a love rivalry with Lieselotte. After the new atelier is established, she appoints herself as Kurt's bodyguard and official go-between for assignments. She is the wielder of "Snowflake", a sword forged by Kurt from a combination of mithril and adamantite, which makes it strong enough to cut through stone.
After Liselotte decides to reveal the whole truth to Kurt, Yulicia leaves the Atelier, feeling unworthy of Kurt's trust after she had deceived him for so long.
Lieselotte Homuross (リーゼロッテ・ホムロス, Rīzerotte Homurosu)
Voiced by: Minami Tanaka (Japanese); Hayden Daviau (English)
The fifteen-year-old third princess of the kingdom of Homuross, born to the king of Homuross and his second wife, a princess from the Gurumak Empire. Because of her role as the living link between the two realms, she is targeted by members of the Homuross nobility and the Demon King for assassination, and was therefore taken in by Atelier Master Ophilia for her protection after a curse was placed on her which would have slowly starved her to death. After Kurt unwittingly cures her and treats her like a normal girl, she becomes very infatuated with him and develops a rivalry with Yulicia. The other members of the Atelier, fully aware of Lieselotte's situation, keep her identity secret from Kurt until, tired of the deception, she finally reveals the entire truth to him.
Liselotte is the wielder of "Butterfly", a short sword forged by Kurt which when unsheathed has the magical power to create corporeal illusions of not only herself, but also other people. She can also use it to turn herself and others invisible.
Sina (シーナ, Shīna)
Voiced by: Ayana Taketatsu (Japanese); Kelly Greenshield (English)
A 16-year-old ranger for the adventuring party Sakura, and Kans' younger sister. At first, she is highly critical of Kurt after he briefly joins their group for a dungeon exploration, but later on, she is swift to change her mind after seeing him use his extraordinary mining skills to singlehandedly dismember iron dragon golems and single-handedly build the fortress town Atelier in only three days. She would eventually become part of the atelier's personal adventurer group with the entire Sakura party.
Kans (カンス, Kansu)
Voiced by: Kaito Ishikawa (Japanese); Mauricio Ortiz-Segura (English)
Sina's older brother, and Sakura's heavy armor fighter. Despite his size, he has a calm attitude to things and would often be the voice of reason for his rash sister. He later becomes part of the atelier's personal adventurer group with the entire Sakura party.
Danzo (ダンゾウ, Danzō)
Voiced by: Takuya Eguchi (Japanese); Ian Sinclair (English)
A samurai, and the leader of the Sakura party. A competent fighter and also someone who is of little words but kind and sincere to his friends and compatriots. Also has a scar on the upper left side of his face. He later becomes part of the atelier's personal adventurer group with the entire Sakura party.
Akuri (アクリ)
Voiced by: Ai Kakuma (Japanese); Jalitza Delgado (English)
An apparently 3-year-old girl of human appearance, but mysterious origin who hatched from an egg given to Kurt after he solves a village's water problem by creating a new lake. When it hatches, the child imprints on him and adopts an appearance similar to his. Despite fears to the contrary, Akuri displays a normal infant's personality and has adopted Kurt, Yulicia, and Lieselotte as her "parents" and Sina as her "big sister". Kurt gives her the name "Akuri" (which means "edge" or "side" in another country's language) as a connecting line for his adopted family. She has an inborn teleportation ability, which she usually uses to join her "parents" whenever she feels lonely.
Rikuto (陸斗)
A handsome twenty-year-old man who is installed by Lieselotte as the Atelier's figurehead Master. However, he does not actually exist; he is in reality a corporeal illusion conjured by Lieselotte's magic short sword "Butterfly". His physical appearance is based on what Lieselotte imagines Kurt will look like at age twenty. The only ones who know he is an illusion are Lieselotte, Yulicia and Mimico; naturally, Kurt himself has no idea and presumes Rikuto to be a real person. Rikuto is abandoned after Liselotte tells Kurt the entire truth about his role as Atelier Master.
Elena (エレナ, Erena)
A golem in the form of a young woman who was created by Kurt. Also known as Prototype Golem No. 1.

=== Atelier associates ===
Mimico (ミミコ, Mimiko)
Voiced by: Hisako Kanemoto (Japanese); Sarah Wiedenheft (English)
A high-ranking royal court magician and the owner of the Mimico Café in the royal capital, which is actually a magic items shop. She appears far younger than she actually is, and is very sensitive about revealing her actual age. With her rank, she is responsible for covert security missions within the kingdom, and is the leader of Phantom. In the pursuit of her kingdom's safety, she does not shy away from employing torture against captive enemies. The steady stream of Kurt's incredible doings have gotten to the point where she accepts them with a weary resignation.
Ophilia (オフィリア, Ofiria)
Voiced by: Rie Tanaka (Japanese); Madeleine Norton (English)
One of the kingdom's originally fifteen Atelier Masters. She was entrusted with Princess Lieselotte to heal her from a slow-acting but deadly curse inflicted by an unknown source. After becoming aware of Kurt's abilities, especially after he easily cures Lieselotte of her curse, she joins Yulicia and the others in opening the new atelier. In time (and despite being more than ten years older than him), she also begins to look at Kurt in a romantic way.
Kirshell (カーシェル, Kāsheru)
Voiced by: Saho Shirasu (Japanese); Alison Schonhoff (English)
A clerk at the Hello Hello Work Station employment agency in the city of Samara, who is shocked on a regular basis by Kurt's uncanny efficiency. Upon the insistence of Kurt's atelier, she is later promoted to manager of a branch of the agency in Valha City.
Michelle Lalakata (ミシェル・ララカタ, Misheru Rarakata)
Voiced by: Maria Naganawa (Japanese); Lisette Monique Diaz (English)
An eighty-year-old elf maid and Ophilia's housekeeper. While competent at cooking and assisting Ophilia, she is abysmally unskilled at cleaning.
Hildegard (ヒルデガルト, Hirudegaruto)
Voiced by: Rie Kugimiya (Japanese); Emi Lo (English)
A member of the Demonfolk (or Horned Folk) who met Kurt while Hildegard and her father came to Kurt's village for medicine. After she was poisoned from eating toxic berries and Kurt saved her life, they became friends. However, because of a slight error in its concoction, the medicine Kurt gave her accidentally made her ageless, a detail which she has resented him for since that time. She is later captured by Count Tycone to serve as an unwilling donor for the immortality elixir, which he intends to give to his daughter Famil to rejuvenate her, but freed by Kurt. Afterwards, she returned home along with her servant Solflare.
Solflare (ソルフレア, Sorufurea)
Voiced by: Hitomi Nabatame (Japanese); Monica Rial (English)
A member of the Demonfolk who looks like an extremely busty dark elf-like woman with deep black eyes. Hildegard's loyal servant, she searches for her mistress after she got kidnapped by Count Tycone, but unintentionally clashes with Kurt and his friends after she witnesses Akuri's teleportation ability and wants to use her to infiltrate the Count's mansion. After she is captured and has a chance to explain herself, Kurt and the others promise to fulfill her mission and release her after Hildegard has been liberated. She and Hildegard return home afterwards.
Alreid Kukuso (アルレイド・くくそ)
Voiced by: Kenichirō Matsuda (Japanese); Mike Smith (English)
A veteran general in the royal army of Homuross. He once hired Kurt, shortly after the latter's dismissal from the Flaming Dragon Fang, to repair the walls of Valha City under his supervision. When the town comes under attack by demonic and undead forces summoned by the Demon Lord to kill Princess Lieselotte, he is flabbergasted to witness how the members of the horde touching the wall sections fixed by Kurt are destroyed by a purification magic Kurt had unwittingly imbued the mortar with. After learning about Kurt's secret promotion to Atelier Master for his town, he is made privy to Princess Lieselotte's predicament by Yulicia and the other Atelier backers, and assists their group in his official capacity when needed.
Generick Pirahan (ジェネリック・ピラハン, Jenerikku Pirahan)
A young and energetic, but skirtchasing lieutenant general in the royal army of Homuross. Along with General Alreid, he is made aware of the attempts on Princess Lieselotte's life and joins her inner circle of protectors.
Tanga Kokoluka (タンガ・ココルカ) / Count Tycone (タイコン伯爵, Taikon Hakushaku)
An opportunistic margrave of the border domain of Tycone in Homuross. When the new Atelier is established in his fiefdom, he appoints its Master to viceroy to increase his influence at the royal court. When his beloved daughter fell victim to an aging curse, he tried to prevent her death, in his desperation going so far as pondering to summon the Demon King to the mortal world, but is unaware that he is being manipulated by the very same demon who implanted his daughter's curse. After hearing of Hildegard and the immortality elixir which Kurt had accidentally given her, he kidnaps her, bringing Kurt, Yulicia and Liselotte onto his trail. After Famil is miraculously cured by Kurt and the Demon King is defeated again by Yulicia, Lieselotte issues him a pardon in exchange for his unconditional support of Kurt's atelier.
Famil (ファミル, Famiru)
Count Tycone's daughter, who is officially believed to be dead. Originally nine years old, she fell victim to an aging curse which rapidly turned her into an old woman, and her father locked her away in a secret room inside his mansion. Knowing of her father's plans to cure her by using an accidentally immortalized demon girl as a donor for an immortality elixir, she tries to get Kurt's help in freeing Hildegard when he chances upon her, and kill her father before he can sell his soul to the Demon King. However, after she eats a steamed bun made by Kurt, the curse is broken and she reverts back to her original young age.
Golund McDannatt (ゴルンド・マクダナット, Gorundo Makudanatto)
A mild-mannered consul in Count Tycone's employ who acts as majordomo, and a secret informant for Bandana. Originally of noble birth, he was prevented from mingling with the realm's nobility by a scandalous indiscretion committed by his stepfather.
Phantom
An organization of shadow operatives shrouded in black robes working for the royal house of Homuross under Mimico's command. They serve as hidden observers and messengers, as well as discreet guardians for the Valha Atelier. They have the uncanny ability to appear and disappear virtually unseen, which unnerves Yulicia more often than not.
Loretta Element (ロレッタ, Roretta)
Yulicia's cousin from her mother's older sister, whom she calls sister. She is also a Warrior Maiden, and the current ruler of Isisese Island.

=== Flaming Dragon Fang members ===
Bandana (バンダナ)
Voiced by: Mayu Yoshioka (Japanese); Morgan Lea (English)
A member of the Flaming Dragon Fang and a ranger who uses rope snares as her primary weapon. She appears easy-going and sarcastic, but is actually highly observant, sharp-witted, and skilled at manipulating people. A disciple of an unknown party called the Great Sage, she is the only one of her party to recognize Kurt's special attributes and, after the dissolution of the Flaming Dragon Fang, keeps an eye on him and subtly guides his path from the shadows. She also steals Golnova's teleportation device to aid her in her investigations.
Marlefiss (マーレフィス, Mārefisu)
Voiced by: Saori Hayami (Japanese); Katie Otten (English)
A member of the Flaming Dragon Fang and a female blonde priestess with an extreme fear of darkness. Despite her mild looks, she is selfish, arrogant and just as vocal as the others about dismissing Kurt, which she comes to regret after she discovers that without him, her healing powers are far weaker than before. She is later forcibly recruited by Bishop Tristan Meynolf into his plot to murder Lieselotte, and the same curse previously used on the princess is placed upon her to ensure her cooperation. After she is found and freed by Kurt, she is immediately taken into custody for her (if unwilling) part in the assassination attempt and coerced to work with Mimico to uncover the conspiracy and pass on any information she can provide on Kurt.
Golnova (ゴルノヴァナ, Gorunova)
Voiced by: Nobuhiko Okamoto (Japanese); Christian Thorsen (English)
The leader of the Flaming Dragon Fang, a red-haired male fighter wielding a magical fire sword. Short-tempered and prone to acting without thinking, he is the first to boot Kurt out of the party, only to deeply regret it later because of his love for good food (Kurt was the party's only capable cook) and because his powers are weakened by Kurt's absence. After causing a scene at several high-class restaurants and resisting arrest, he becomes a fugitive from the law and flees from the town into the hills, where Bandana leads him to a formerly buried ruin containing Elena, deliberately tricking him into opening it.

=== Antagonists ===
Demon Lord
A high-ranking demon who feeds on fear to increase his power, and currently the main antagonist of the series. By trying to kill Lieselotte, he ends up being opposed by Kurt, Yulicia, and their friends, learning that even his power is ineffective before Kurt's creations.
Scripter (スクリプター, Sukuriputā)
Voiced by: Yuichiro Umehara
A high-level servant of the Demon King, who appears as a black-haired, very handsome human man. He is a vicious schemer who likes to execute his plans via a preset script written by himself (hence his name). He was the one who seduced Taycone and Tristan Meynolf, and cursed Famil in order to enable the summoning of his master into the mortal world. Although successful, the Demon King ends up retreating upon learning of Kurt's origins.
Tristan Meynolf (トリスタン・メイノルフ, Torisutan Meinorufu)
The bishop of the Church of St. Polan from the neighboring Polan Empire, he aims to destroy the alliance between the realms of Homuross and Gurumaku by assassinating Princess Lieselotte. After his first attempt to starve the princess to death with a curse is thwarted by Kurt, his second try is likewise foiled when (thanks to a security spell installed by Kurt) the curse cast by Meynolf's subservient wizard is reflected back on him. When the attack fails and the Demon Lord is banished, Tristan is assassinated by Scripter for his failure.
Bibinokke (ビビノッケ)
Voiced by: Shinya Takahashi
Also known as Thousand Faces, Bibinokke is a contract saboteur who joins adventuring parties to destroy them from within in return for pay from their competitors. Hired to lure the Sakura adventuring team into a goblin-infested cave, he bailed out just before the expedition, whereupon Kurt was hired to take his place. After Kurt, Yulicia and Lieselotte rescue the group, Danzo deduces Bibinokke's plot and confronts him. After Danzo spares his life (but giving him a tremendous scare), Bibinokke is collected by Mimico's Phantoms.
Gargel (ガーゲル, Gāgeru)
Taycone's scheming chef who does whatever he can to stay at the top of his game. With a festival coming up, he sabotages one of his competitors, a maker of filled buns, only to draw the attention of Kurt's atelier. Kurt and Yulishia assist the bun bakers in creating a new type of steamed bun, which proves very popular. With his villainy exposed, Gargel is arrested for high treason after he unwittingly tries to take Lieselotte hostage for a desperate escape attempt.

== Media ==
=== Light novel ===
No.	Release date	ISBN
1	March 31, 2019	978-4-434-25747-6
2	July 31, 2019	978-4-434-26303-3
3	November 30, 2019	978-4-434-26785-7
4	June 30, 2020	978-4-434-27333-9
5	August 31, 2020	978-4-434-27776-4
6	January 31, 2021	978-4-434-28400-7
7	August 31, 2021	978-4-434-29271-2
8	February 28, 2022	978-4-434-29994-0
9	November 30, 2022	978-4-434-31164-2
10	August 31, 2023	978-4-434-32488-8
11	March 30, 2025	978-4-434-35495-3
12	March 30, 2026	978-4-434-37463-0

=== Manga ===
A manga adaptation illustrated by Naharu Furukawa began serialization AlphaPolis' manga website on December 17, 2019. The manga's chapters have been compiled into nine tankōbon volumes as of November 2025. The series is published in English on AlphaPolis' Alpha Manga app.

No.	Original release date	Original ISBN	North American release date	North American ISBN
1	November 30, 2020	978-4-434-28137-2	October 27, 2023	—
2	May 31, 2021	978-4-434-28896-8	October 27, 2023	—
3	February 28, 2022	978-4-434-29998-8	October 25, 2024	—
4	December 31, 2022	978-4-434-31353-0	March 21, 2025	—
5	August 31, 2023	978-4-434-32502-1	May 23, 2025	—
6	February 29, 2024	978-4-434-33490-0	June 20, 2025	—
7	October 31, 2024	978-4-434-34674-3	August 28, 2026	—
8	March 31, 2025	978-4-434-35480-9	—	—
9	November 30, 2025	978-4-434-36806-6	—	—
10	September 30, 2026	978-4-434-38457-8	—	—

=== Anime ===
An anime television series adaptation was announced on October 18, 2024. It is produced by EMT Squared and directed by Hisashi Ishii, with Deko Akao writing series scripts, Miyuki Nakamura designing the characters, and Harikemu Wata composing the music. The series aired from April 6 to June 22, 2025, on Tokyo MX and other networks. The opening theme song is "Facstory", performed by MeseMoa, and the ending theme song is "Haru ni Kiete" (春に消えて; Vanish in the Spring), performed by Lot Spirits. Crunchyroll streamed the series.

A second season was announced on November 12, 2025.

==== Episodes ====
No.	Title	Directed by	Written by	Storyboarded by	Original release date (Note: Episodes are released on Abema, d-anime Store and Crunchyroll a week before their televised airings.)
1	"The Guy In Charge of Chores With Low Self-Esteem Turned Out to Actually Possess Incredible Skills"; Transliteration: "Jiko Hyōka no Hikui Zatsuyōgakari ga, Jitsuha Tondemo Sukiru no Mochinushi datta Toiu Yoku Aru Hanashi" (Japanese: 自己評価の低い雑用係が、実はとんでもスキルの持ち主だったというよくある話)	Hisashi Ishii	Deko Akao	Hisashi Ishii	April 6, 2025
Kurt, a young handyman for the Flaming Dragon Fang adventuring party, is fired because the other members deem him completely useless and wish to replace him with a more competent adventurer. Despondent, he travels to the city of Samaela and looks for a job at the Hello Hello Work Station. While he flunks his combat aptitude tests, he is given a temporary job at repairing a border town's walls. Not only does he fix the walls in an impossibly fast time, he also improves on them; and with all the work done, the foreman has no more use of him, although he does transfer a handsome payout for Kurt's services. As he returns to the agency for another job, he encounters Yulicia, a former adventurer and new mine owner who is looking for help in proving her new mine's profitability to avoid having her inheritance impounded within the week. When Kurt offers his help, she reluctantly accepts it, but becomes shock-impressed by his uncanny skills, his naivety towards them, and the startlingly profitable results of his work after he effortlessly converts the crystals he found into extremely powerful magic stones. Mimico, the magic shop owner she sells the stones to, offers to promote the funding of a magic research atelier, with the stones' creator as its director. In order to protect Kurt, Yulicia decides to keep his identity and abilities secret from the public.
2	"His First Atelier"; Transliteration: "Hajimete no Kōbō" (Japanese: はじめての工房)	Harume Kosaka	Saeka Fujimoto	Hisashi Ishii	April 13, 2025
Yulicia returns to discover that Kurt had built a cabin in her absence. She tells Kurt of Mimico's offer, but Kurt refuses as he still wants to work for her. While they continue mining, Kurt finds deposits of mithril and orichalcum, extremely rare minerals which are so common in his village that he treats them like everyday finds, and digs a tunnel right through the mountain in mere hours, providing Yulicia with a means to pay off her taxes by charging travelers for using this new shortcut. While conferring with Mimico, Yulicia agrees that Kurt needs to become an Atelier Meister so the kingdom can protect and monitor him. Meanwhile, the Flaming Dragon Fang disbands after their efficiency has dropped mysteriously after Kurt's dismissal and being replaced by another adventurer, and party leader Golnova has become a wanted fugitive because of his destructive rage over missing out on Kurt's cooking. Kurt bumps into Bandana, the Flaming Dragon Fang's ranger, who convinces Kurt to work for the Atelier Meister Ophelia. While cleaning the atelier, Kurt encounters a young girl named Lieselotte, who is suffering from a curse which Ophelia has been vainly trying to break, and makes her some rice porridge which inexplicably cures her. A shocked Ophelia takes Lieselotte to Mimico, where she is revealed to be Princess Lieselotte, daughter of the King of Homuross and his second wife, the princess of the Gurumak Empire. Her existence ensures peace between the two powerful nations, while her death would cause a war.
3	"What Mining Means To Him"; Transliteration: "Kare ni Totte no Saikutsu" (Japanese: 彼にとっての採掘)	Koji Sasaki	Azuki Shōzu	Yoshihiko Iwata	April 20, 2025
Mimico suggests three suspects behind Lieselotte's curse: General Sannova Ristkatz, Bishop Tristan Meynolf, and Queen Isadora, the King's third wife. To draw out the culprit, Ophelia decides to open a fictional Atelier where Lieselotte will officially go for required magical training, and Kurt is chosen as the Meister. Kurt gets a job as porter with the adventuring party Sakura, which consists of warrior Kans, his sister Sina the ranger, and Danzo the samurai and group leader. While hunting iron golems in a dungeon, the group is attacked by goblins. Kans and Danzo stay behind while Sina gets Kurt to safety, but they encounter iron dragon golems, only for Sina to be shocked when Kurt singlehandedly dismantles the golems with his mining skills. Secretly directed by Bandana, Lieselotte and Yulicia follow Kurt to the dungeon and rescue the adventurers. Yulicia informs Kurt about the Atelier and hires him as a worker, though officially he is listed as Meister, and also hires Sakura as security. Yulicia sends Kurt to Mimico to rate his skills; Mimico lies and tells Kurt he is merely a mid-rank handyman, whereas in reality, his skills and magic are virtually unmeasurable.
4	"New Friends in a New Atelier"; Transliteration: "Shin e Bō no Atarashī Nakama" (Japanese: 新エ房の新しい仲間)	Ken Kiyota	Nora Mōri	Hisashi Ishii	April 27, 2025
Mimico and Ophelia decide to open the Atelier in the frontier town whose walls Kurt had repaired. After their arrival, while Kurt is single-handedly building the atelier, Yulicia tells Sakura her and Lieselotte's true identities and about keeping Kurt ignorant of his uncanny skills. Sina is unhappy with lying, but Yulicia points out Kurt is so naïve that villains could take advantage of him; therefore, it will be their responsibility to guard both Kurt and Lieselotte. Bandana contacts Danzo with news that Sakura is targeted by a contract saboteur named Bibinokke. Danzo threatens Bibinokke, but leaves him alive and shortly after, Bibinokke is arrested by Phantom, Mimico's secret police. Bandana receives orders from her master to investigate Kurt's hometown. Sakura are flabbergasted when within only three days Kurt builds an Atelier more luxurious than a mansion, complete with gardens, a self-generating water source, a flameless lighting source, and luxurious bedrooms. Yulicia sets up anti-curse barriers around the Atelier to keep Lieselotte safe, only to find that they have been washed off by Kurt, who thought they were graffiti. With no more supplies to re-establish the barrier, Yulicia realizes she will have to protect Lieselotte herself until Mimico arrives in a few days.
5	"A Frontier Town With Enemies at All Sides"; Transliteration: "Shimensoka no Henkyō Machi" (Japanese: 四面楚歌の辺境町)	Masayuki Iimura	Nora Mōri	Koji Sasaki	May 4, 2025
For the Flaming Dragon Fang's recent failures, Marlefiss is excommunicated by Bishop Tristan, but is offered forgiveness and promotion if she assassinates Lieselotte. To ensure her obedience, he afflicts her with the same curse he had placed on the princess. Another assassination attempt is foiled by a barrier on the whole atelier created by Kurt, reflecting the curse back on its caster, making him shine brilliantly without killing him; however, the caster is murdered for his failure before Mimico and Ophelia can arrest him. A demon lord, whom Tristan has consigned himself to, uses Marlefiss' magical power to raise and send an army of undead against the town, but General Alreid, the garrison commander (and site foreman from Kurt's renovation job), is shocked when the army is destroyed by the wall sections which Kurt had repaired and imbued with purification magic. Learning of the assault, Yulicia plans to attack the demon hiding in a disused fort with help from Alreid and Kurt's magic crystals. Feeling he is not contributing anything, Kurt distracts himself with blacksmithing, creating a smaller version of Danzo's samurai sword, which he gifts to Lieselotte. Kurt erroneously concludes that Lieselotte is scared of the vandal whose "graffiti" he had erased, and when told that Yulicia has gone to "clean up" the ruins decides to take Lieselotte to the ruined fort to confront the culprit.
6	"The Ninth Direction"; Transliteration: "Yomoha Kata no Kyū Hōme" (Japanese: 四方ハ方の九方目)	Shigenori Awai	Saeka Fujimoto	Hiroshi Yamamoto	May 11, 2025
Alreid and Yulicia confront the Demon Lord, but are unable to kill him because of a magic circle fueled by Marlefiss' magic protecting him, while slowly draining Marlefiss's life force. Kurt and Lieselotte tunnel into the fortress from under the floor. Kurt mistakes the Demon Lord's magic circle for more graffiti, concludes that Marlefiss is working with the graffiti culprit and remains behind to clean it up while Lieselotte goes to find Yulicia. The Demon Lord attacks the princess, but fails to slay her because a spell Kurt put into her new short sword "Butterfly" has created illusory doubles of her. Kurt's "clean up" erases the magic circle, rendering the Demon Lord vulnerable, and Lieselotte uses one of Kurt's magic crystals to banish him and his army. Kurt, with no idea what is really going on, shares his rice ball lunch with Marlefiss (which unintentionally removes her curse), and Marlefiss is arrested by Phantom for her involvement in the attack, but not before she reveals that Bishop Tristan is behind the assassination plot. Kurt cooks a celebratory feast for the army, who are all astonished when the food heals their injuries. Elsewhere, Margrave Taicone pays a visit to his captive, the demon girl Hildegard.
7	"The New Papa of a Mysterious Egg"; Transliteration: "Fushigina Tamago no Shin Papa" (Japanese: 不思議な卵の新パパ)	Koji Sasaki	Deko Akao	Takeshi Shirato	May 18, 2025
While the Atelier is traveling to a village suffering from drought, Kurt remembers saving a girl called Hildegard, who ate poisonous berries. While Yulicia learns that the neighboring village is also suffering from drought, Kurt uses an underground spring to create a huge lake to help the local wildlife (thereby solving both villages' problems), and the villagers gift them baskets of waterfowl eggs. Lieselotte and Alreid visit Taicone, who insists on having their anonymous Meister named Viceroy of the Frontier despite Lieselotte's protests, since this would expose Kurt. Mimico discovers that Tristan was assassinated by unknown accomplices for his failures. One of Kurt's eggs mysteriously hatches a three-year-old girl that looks exactly like him and accepts him, Yulicia, and Lieselotte as her "parents", and sees Sina as her "big sister". Yulicia is certain she is a monster, but Kurt defends her, and when Sakura backs Kurt up, Yulicia agrees to leave the child, whom Kurt names Akuri, be. Yulicia passes Akuri's DNA to Phantom to identify her species, and Kurt builds a bedroom for her that doubles as a mithril-reinforced cell to prevent her escape. Somehow, Akuri turns up in the carriage heading to their next job, as Sina was supposed to be watching over her. They are shocked to learn that their job includes defeating the Demon King.
8	"Akuri's Fwoosh"; Transliteration: "Akuri no Byuntu" (Japanese: アクリのびゅんっ)	Harume Kosaka	Azuki Shōzu	Shirato Takeshi	May 25, 2025
After that shocking announcement, Kurt and Yulicia meet their actual client, the daughter of the old wannabe doom prophet, who introduces them to their actual task: revitalizing the appetite of her farm's pigs. Kurt diagnoses the problem and produces a feed mix that the pigs hungrily consume, but which also attracts a young dragon whom Kurt tames. Yulicia then finds and confronts a sinister pursuer, a dark-skinned demon woman who demands Akuri from them. Just as Yulicia is brought to her knees, Kurt and Akuri (who arrives via teleportation; therefore explaining how Akuri caught up to them) intervene, forcing the demon woman to break off the fight and escape. Kurt later finds her, heavily injured, and nurses her back to health, but also incapacitates her to face punishment; when he casually mentions his childhood demon girl friend Hildegard to her, he notices the woman's unusually strong reaction to that name. As they return to the atelier, Lieselotte introduces a handsome young man, who looks much like an adult Kurt, as the Atelier Master.
9	"Lise's Confession"; Transliteration: "Rīze no Kokuhaku" (Japanese: リーゼの告白)	Ken Kiyota	Azuki Shōzu	Koji Sasaki	June 1, 2025
Yulicia realizes the man, Rikuto, is an illusion from Lieselotte's sword showing Kurt as a young adult, though Kurt is oblivious to this. Mimico reports Akuri's DNA is human, but her fingernails contain crystals attuned for ancient teleportation magic, meaning that she is not really human at all. They convince Mimico to let Akuri stay at Kurt's place. The imprisoned demon woman, Solflare, admits she needs to rescue her mistress Hildegard, who is imprisoned by Margrave Taicone, and that she had wanted to use Akuri's teleportation magic to do it. Mimico agrees they will rescue Hildegard as long as the woman stays at the Atelier. Phantom reports there is a room in Taicone's mansion that only he can open, so if Hildegard is there they will need to trick Taicone into opening the door. They plan to break in during a three-day festival, with Lieselotte deciding to take Kurt on a date on the first day while Yulicia gets the second day, then rescue Hildegard on the third. On Day One with Lieselotte and Akuri, Kurt admits he has never really been to festivals because of his maintenance worker duties for the Flaming Dragon Fang, so Lieselotte ensures they spend all day having fun. With Kurt all happy, Lieselotte plans to confess her feelings, only for Kurt to spot Taicone's castle nearby. With the mood gone, Lieselotte settles for telling Kurt she and everyone at the Atelier deeply respect and care about him and will continue working alongside him.
10	"Yulishia's Date"; Transliteration: "Yūrishia no Dēto" (Japanese: ユーリシアのデート)	Fumio Maezono	Saeka Fujimoto	Hisashi Ishii	June 8, 2025
To replace the weapon broken in the fight with the Demon Lord, Kurt forges Yulicia a mithril/adamantite sword which she names Snowflake. Before she can begin her festival date with Kurt, he gets involved in a dispute between thugs and a meat bun seller. Phantom hints to Yulicia that Gargel, Taicone's favorite chef, sent the thugs as he is afraid of being defeated by the meat bun stall in the food-stall competition. With the stall owner badly injured and since the thugs had destroyed the meat bun stall's confections, Kurt designs a new sweet bun from ingredients available at the festival. Gargel tries to hire the thugs again, only for them to be revealed as Lieselotte and Phantom in magical disguises. Gargel tries to attack Lieselotte (unaware of her true status), so he is imprisoned for life, leaving Taicone with no chef at his mansion. As he has a meeting with Lieselotte the next day, Taicone hurriedly demands a replacement chef and settles on the winner of the food stall contest: Kurt. On the third day, Yulicia and Lieselotte head to Taicone's mansion with a plan to rescue Hildegard, only for Phantom to urgently report Kurt was forcibly taken to Taicone's kitchen to serve as chef, along with Akuri, ruining their plan at the last second.
11	"The Margrave's Secret"; Transliteration: "Henkyō Haku no Himitsu" (Japanese: 辺境伯の秘密)	Shigenori Awai	Nora Mōri	Yōko Īzuka	June 15, 2025
Once inside the Margrave's mansion, Kurt gets passed the inaccessible area with the help of Akuri and easily opens the door to the impregnable room, but instead of Hildegard, he finds an elderly woman named Famil, Taicone's daughter who supposedly died years ago. Lieselotte manipulates Taicone into thinking he is alone with Rikuto and overhears Taicone asking about eternal youth. Taicone explains that since demons live for thousands of years, it should be possible to extend human life by transplanting demon cells into human bodies; however, this is declared illegal. Realizing from his desperation that Taicone wants the youth drug for someone else, Lieselotte fakes a break-in, then follows Taicone as he rushes to Famil's room. Famil leads Kurt to Hildegard's cell. After freeing her, Hildegard blames him for her imprisonment, claiming she has not aged since Kurt cured her of poison with a potion of Rainbow Flowers before Taicone finds them. Despite all the evidence that Famil suffers from a rapid-aging disease and Taicone sought to use Hildegard to cure her, Kurt mistakenly concludes Taicone is a lolicon, and when Famil grew too old, he planned to adopt Hildegard to replace her since Hildegard would remain young forever. Astounded by his idiocy, Hildegard paralyses Kurt so she can have a sane conversation with everyone. Despite his motives for imprisoning her, Famil asks Hildegard to kill Taicone.
12	"A Common Story About How the Former Head of Chores for a Party of Heroes Was Actually SSS-Rank in All Except Combat Skills"; Transliteration: "Eiyū Pātī no Zatsuyō-gakari ga, Jitsuwa Sentō Igai ga SSS Ranku Datta to iu Yoku Aru Hanashi" (Japanese: 英雄パーティーの雑用係が, 実は戦闘以外がSSSランクだったというよくある話)	Hisashi Ishii	Deko Akao	Hisashi Ishii	June 22, 2025
Confronted by Lieselotte, Hildegrad, and Yulicia, Taicone confesses but is still willing to sell even his own soul to have Famil cured. Famil suddenly intervenes, turned young again by Kurt's meat buns. The demon Scripter appears, admitting he was the one who cursed Famil, assassinated Bishop Tristan, and cursed Lieselotte. Yulicia attacks Scripter, who notes Snowflake is a holy sword, so he flees, but re-summons the defeated Demon Lord. They find themselves unable to defeat him. Hildegrad is almost killed, but is saved by a rock hard bread that Kurt gave her, which is strong enough to block the Demon Lord's attack. After undoing Hildegard's paralysis, Kurt and Akuri appear, and after the Demon Lord realizes Kurt must be from Hast Village, he flees the scene. Kurt explains that Demon Lords often attacked Hast, so the villagers became very good at defeating them. Scripter's summoning circle attempts to gather 100 souls worth of magic as payment for summoning the Demon Lord, but everyone is shocked when instead it seizes Kurt's meat buns and vanishes. The Church keeps the incident quiet, since the implication is Kurt could theoretically summon an infinite number of demons using meat buns instead of human sacrifices. Bandana reaches Hast and concludes that not only is Kurt even more powerful than he seems, but that Akuri is connected to the mythical Great Sage. Taicone grants Kurt the rank of Knight, elevates Yulicia to Baroness, and appoints Rikuto Viceroy of the Frontier. Returning to her home with Solflare, Hildegard reminisces how it has been 1,200 years since she and Kurt met as children. Kurt tries to return to his handyman job, but Rikuto announces he is leaving and may be gone for some time, appointing Lieselotte as proxy Viceroy and Kurt as proxy Atelier Meister.
