= Minami Tanaka =

Japanese voice actress (born 1996)

- 田中 美海
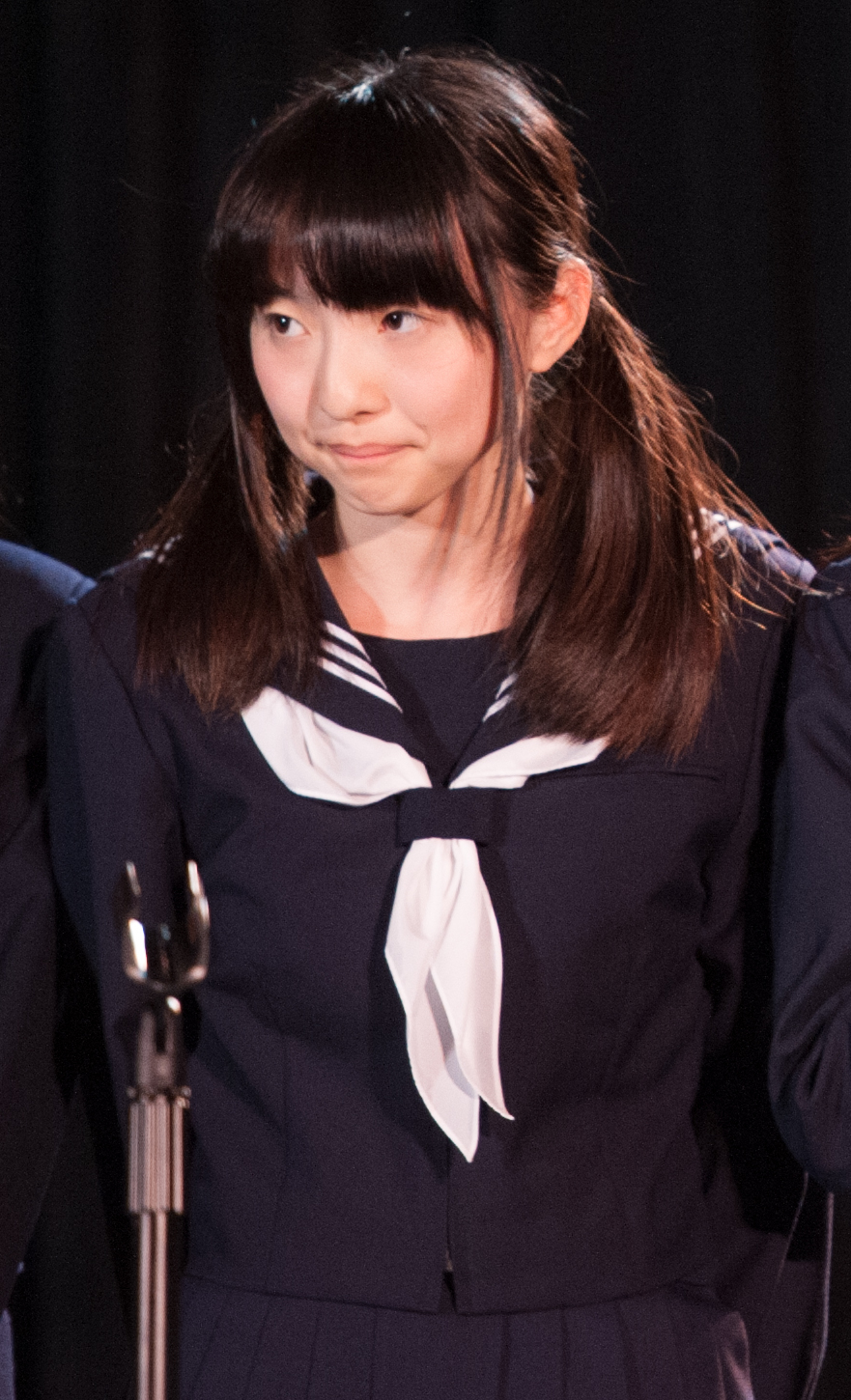
- Tanaka in 2014
- Born: January 22, 1996 (age 30); Shinagawa, Tokyo, Japan
- Other name: Miñami
- Occupation: Voice actress
- Years active: 2014–present
- Agent: 81 Produce
- Notable work: PriPara as Non Manaka, Kanon, Junon, Pinon, Kiratto Pri Chan as Rabiri
- Spouse: unknown (m. 2023)

Minami Tanaka (田中 美海, Tanaka Minami; born January 22, 1996) is a Japanese voice actress.

== Personal life ==
On November 22, 2023, she announced her marriage.

== Filmography ==
=== Anime series ===
Year	Title	Role
2014	Dramatical Murder	Girl A, Villager
2014	Hanayamata	Hana N. Fountainstand
2014	PriPara	Non Manaka, Kanon, Junon, Pinon, Kotone, Nodoka
2014	Re:_Hamatora	Female High School Student B
2014	Wake Up, Girls!	Minami Katayama
2015	Assassination Classroom	Hinata Okano
2015	Hacka Doll	Mobami, Princess Kirara
2016	High School Fleet	Junko Heki
2016	Keijo	Usagi Tsukishita
2016	Mahou Shoujo Nante Mouiidesukara	Daiya
2016	Schwarzesmarken	Katia Waldheim
2016	Scorching Ping Pong Girls	Agari Kamiya
2017	Idol Time PriPara	Non Manaka, Kanon, Junon, Pinon,
2017	Kakegurui	Mary Saotome
2017	New Laughing Salesman	Nishiki Isobe
2018	Caligula	Suzuna Kagura
2018	Killing Bites	Pure Inui
2018	Zombie Land Saga	Lily Hoshikawa
2019	Hitori Bocchi no Marumaru Seikatsu	Nako Sunao
2019	Isekai Cheat Magician	Myura
2020	Dropkick on My Devil!	Ran-Ran Oneechan
2020	Kiratto Pri Chan	Rabiri
2020	The Gymnastics Samurai	Kitty Chan
2021	I've Been Killing Slimes for 300 Years and Maxed Out My Level	Shalsha
2021	Let's Make a Mug Too	Himeno Toyokawa
2021	Zombie Land Saga Revenge	Lily Hoshikawa
2021	Tsukimichi: Moonlit Fantasy	Eris
2021	Midnight Fun Nora Version	Nora
2021	Muteking the Dancing Hero	Aki
2022	In the Heart of Kunoichi Tsubaki	Kikyō
2022	Kakegurui Twin	Mary Saotome
2022	I've Somehow Gotten Stronger When I Improved My Farm-Related Skills	Fal-Ys Meigis
2022	Beast Tamer	Sora
2022	Akiba Maid War	Yumechi
2023	The Ancient Magus' Bride	Jasmine St. George
2023	Yuri Is My Job!	Kanoko Amamiya
2023	Mushoku Tensei	Pursena Adoldia
2023	Idol Land PriPara	Non Manaka
2024	Grendizer U	Grace Maria Fleed
2024	Too Many Losing Heroines!	Kaju Nukumizu
2024	Nina the Starry Bride	Nina
2025	The Red Ranger Becomes an Adventurer in Another World	Teltina Liz Wagrel Alvarost
2025	The Unaware Atelier Master	Lieselotte
2025	Betrothed to My Sister's Ex	Anastasia
2025	Li'l Miss Vampire Can't Suck Right	Luna Ishikawa
2026	There Was a Cute Girl in the Hero's Party, So I Tried Confessing to Her	Seek
2026	Medalist 2nd Season	Yotsuha Ushikawa
2026	Ranma ½ Season 3	Tsubasa Kurenai

=== Anime films ===
Year	Title	Role
2015	Wake Up, Girls! Seishun no Kage and Beyond the Bottom	Minami Katayama
2020	High School Fleet: The Movie	Junko Heki
2020	Fate/Grand Order: Camelot – Wandering; Agaterám	Nitocris
2022	Isekai Quartet: The Movie – Another World	Pantagruel
2025	The Rose of Versailles	Marie Thérèse
2025	Zombie Land Saga: Yumeginga Paradise	Lily Hoshikawa

=== Original video animation ===
Year	Title	Role
2014	Wake Up, Girl ZOO!	Minami Katayama
2017	Koro Sensei Quest	Hinata Okano
2020	MILGRAM	Momose Amane

=== Video games ===
Year	Title	Role
2014	Assassination Classroom: Koro-sensei Dai Hōimō	Hinata Okano
2015	Over Legend Endless Tower	Total Station
2016	Fate/Grand Order	Nitocris, Valkyrie Ortlinde
2016	Girls' Frontline	SVD, Serdyukov, Type 79
2016	Granblue Fantasy	Linaria
2017	Kirara Fantasia	Hana N. Fountainstand
2017	Yuki Yuna is a Hero: Hanayui no Kirameki	Mebuki Kusunoki
2018	Onsen Musume: Yunohana Collection	Kira Kurokawa
2019	Punishing: Gray Raven	Nanami
2019	Death end re;Quest	Al Astra
2020	Arknights	April
2020	8 Beat Story	Amor
2020	Magia Record: Puella Magi Madoka Magica Side Story	Hotori Yuzuki
2021	Blue Archive	Tendou Aris
2021	Tsukihime -A piece of blue glass moon-	Satsuki Yumizuka
2022	Mobile Suit Gundam: Iron-Blooded Orphans Urdr-Hunt	Cature Inoshee
2022	Lackgirl I	Ritsu
2023	404 Game Re:set	Arkanoid
2023	Atelier Resleriana: Forgotten Alchemy & the Liberator of Polar Night	Isana
2024	Wuthering Waves	Rover (Female)
2025	Zenless Zone Zero	Alice Thymefield
2026	Blue Archive	Tendou Kei

=== Dubbing ===
==== Live-action ====
Title	Role	Dub for	Notes	Source
Final Cut	Iris	Marie Petiot		
The Final Girls	Vicki Summers	Nina Dobrev		
Odd Squad UK	Agent Osgood	Zach Bent		

==== Animation ====
Title	Role	Notes	Source
Thomas & Friends: All Engines Go	Thomas		
