= Rika Kinugawa =

Japanese voice actress from Tokyo

- 衣川 里佳
- Born: Tokyo, Japan
- Occupation: Voice actress
- Years active: 2015–present
- Agent: Tokyo Actor's Consumer's Cooperative Society

Rika Kinugawa (衣川 里佳, Kinugawa Rika) is a Japanese voice actress from Tokyo. She was affiliated with First Wind Production.

== Filmography ==
=== TV anime ===
- Castle Town Dandelion (2015), elementary schoolboy
- The Testament of Sister New Devil (2015), woman
- Orange (2016), Takako Chino
- Hundred (2016), Liddy Steinberg
- Hybrid x Heart Magias Academy Ataraxia (2016), Reiri Hida
- Three Leaves, Three Colors (2016), female customer
- Death March to the Parallel World Rhapsody (2018), Iona
- Harukana Receive (2018), Referee
- Grand Blue (2018), Student B
- Zombie Land Saga (2018), Yūgiri
- BanG Dream! 2nd Season (2019), Black Suits
- Seton Academy: Join the Pack! (2020), Ruka Bando
- Zombie Land Saga Revenge (2021), Yūgiri
- The Great Cleric (2023), Lumina
- Sakuna: Of Rice and Ruin (2024), Kokorowa

=== Film ===
- Orange: Future (2016), Takako Chino
- Zombie Land Saga: Yumeginga Paradise (2025), Yūgiri

=== Video games ===
- Raiden V (2016), Valbarossa Hawkeye
- 100% Orange Juice! (2019), Sherry
- Umamusume: Pretty Derby (2020), Narita Brian
- Azur Lane (2022), SN Kursk
