= Sarah Wiedenheft =

American voice actress

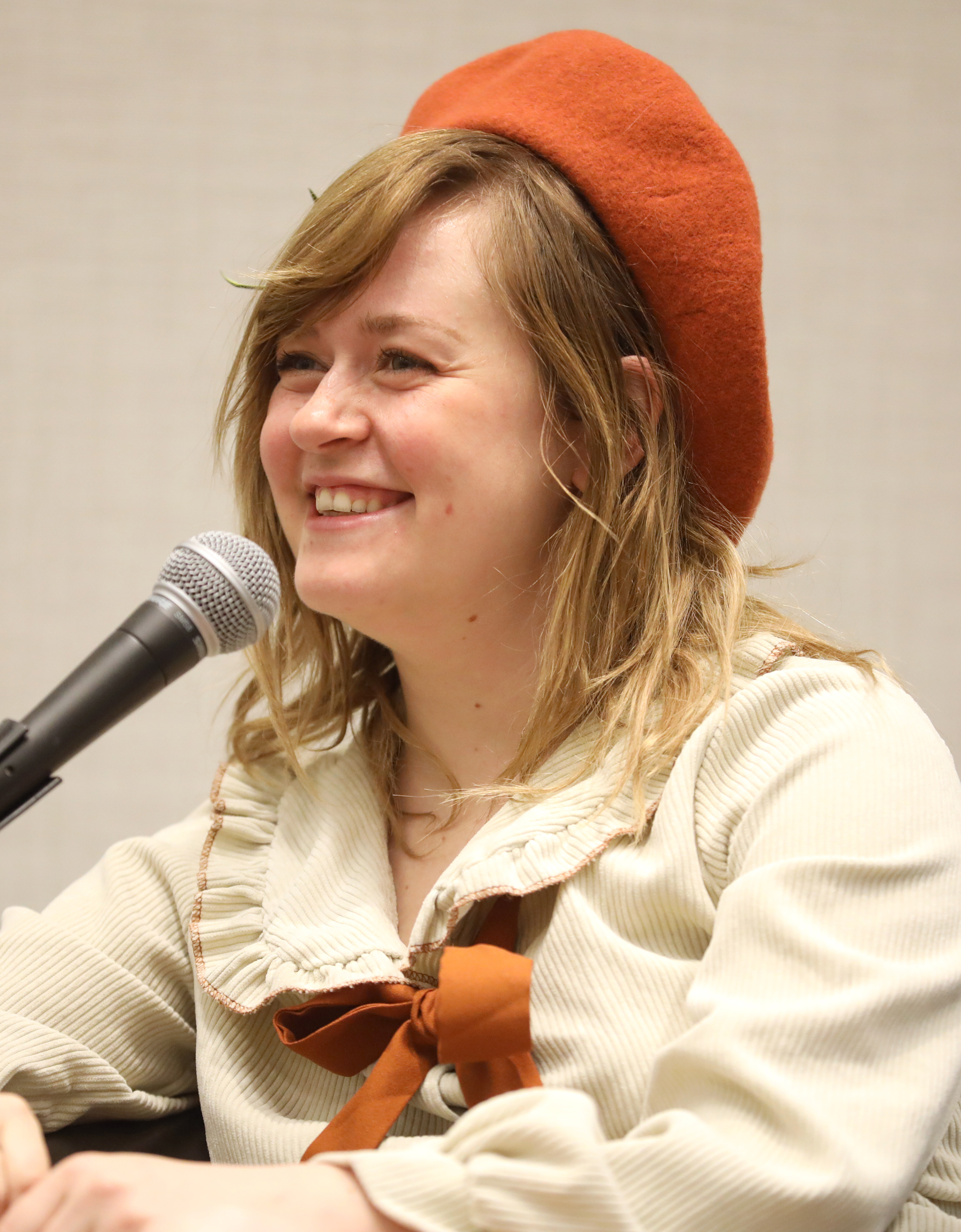
- Wiedenheft in 2024
- Citizenship: United States
- Occupation: Voice actress
- Years active: 2014–present
- Notable work: Chainsaw Man as Power; Dr. Stone as Suika; Land of the Lustrous as Phosphophyllite; Miss Kobayashi's Dragon Maid as Tohru; Black Clover as Charmy Pappitson; Zombie Land Saga as Lily Hoshikawa; Classroom of the Elite as Kikyo Kushida
- Website: www.sarahwiedenheft.com

Sarah Wiedenheft is an American voice actress known for her voice work on English dubs of Japanese anime series and video games.

== Filmography ==
=== Anime ===
List of dubbing performances in anime
Year	Title	Role	Notes	Source
2014	A Certain Scientific Railgun S	Mimori		Website
2015	Free! series	Ran Tachibana		Website
2015	Seraph of the End	Aoi Sangu		Tweet
2015	Blood Blockade Battlefront	Michella Watch		
2015	Fairy Tail	Mattan Ginger		Website
2015	Ultimate Otaku Teacher	Minako Kano		
2015	Shomin Sample	Aika Tenkubashi		
2015	Dragonar Academy	Anya		Website
2015–present	One Piece	Aphelandra, Otama		
2016	Grimgar of Fantasy and Ash	Shihoru		
2016	Divine Gate	Undine		Tweet
2016	Tokyo ESP	Rinka Urushiba		
2016	Endride	Alicia		
2016	Selector Spread Wixoss	Milulun		
2016	Gonna Be the Twin Tail	Aika Tsube/Tail Blue		
2016	Three Leaves, Three Colors	Shino Sonobe		
2016	Terror in Resonance	Wada		
2016	Puzzle and Dragons X	Sonia		
2016	First Love Monster	Leia Aizawa		
2016	Love Live! Sunshine!! series	Ruby Kurosawa		
2016	Orange	Azusa Murasaka		
2016	Keijo	Non Toyoguchi		
2016	Trickster	Makoto Noro		
2016	Bikini Warriors	Mage		
2016	Aquarion Logos	Oura		
2016	Castle Town Dandelion	Hikari Sakurada		
2016–present	Date A Live	Mikie Okamine		
2017	Konohana Kitan	Okiku		
2017	Interviews with Monster Girls	Yuki Kusakabe		
2017	Convenience Store Boy Friends	Miharu Mashiki		
2017	Miss Kobayashi's Dragon Maid	Tohru		
2017	Hand Shakers	Chizuru Mitsudera		
2017	Akiba's Trip: The Animation	Pyuko		
2017	Luck & Logic	Valkyrie		
2017	Kancolle: Kantai Collection	Zuikaku		
2017	In Another World With my Smartphone	Sushie Ernea Ortlinde		
2017	Alice & Zouroku	Sana Kashimura/Cool Lady		
2017	Tsugumomo	Kiriha		
2017	18if	Egos		
2017	Tsuredure Children	Chizuru Takano		
2017	Urahara	Kotoko Watatsumugi		
2017	The Ancient Magus' Bride	Merituuli		
2017–2019	Dragon Ball Super	Zeno		
2017–2021	My Hero Academia	Pony Tsunotori		
2017–2021	Black Clover	Charmy Pappitson		
2017–present	Classroom of the Elite	Kikyo Kushida		
2018	The Morose Mononokean	Shizuku	Also season 2	
2018	SSSS. GRIDMAN	Namiko		
2018	Pop Team Epic	Popuko	Ep. 3A	
2018	Katana Maidens	Kanami Eto		
2018	Island	An Hatoma		
2018	Harukana Receive	Kanata Higa		
2018	Senran Kagura Shinovi Master	Yozakura		
2018	How Not To Summon a Demon Lord	Shera L. Greenwood		
2018	Teasing Master Takagi-san	Takagi	Seasons 1 and 3 only	
2018	Magical Girl Raising Project	Kano Sazanami/Ripple		
2018	Tada Never Falls in Love	Teresa Wagner		
2018	Tokyo Ghoul:re	Saiko Yonebayashi		
2018	Land of the Lustrous	Phosphophyllite		
2018–2021	Zombie Land Saga	Lily Hoshikawa		
2019	How Heavy Are the Dumbbells You Lift?	Akemi Soryuin		
2019	Sarazanmai	Sara Azuma		
2019	Miss Caretaker of Sunohara-sou	Nana Sunohara		
2019	A Certain Scientific Accelerator	Naruha Sakuragi		Tweet
2019	YU-NO: A Girl Who Chants Love at the Bound of this World	Yuno		
2019	Ao-chan Can't Study!	Ao Horie		
2019	Azur Lane	Z23		
2019	Cautious Hero: The Hero Is Overpowered but Overly Cautious	Elulu		
2019–2021	Fire Force	Asako Hague		
2019–2026	Dr. Stone	Suika		
2020	A Certain Scientific Railgun T	Naruha Sakuragi		
2020	Id:Invaded	Kiki Asukai/Kaeru		
2020	Plunderer	Hina		
2020	Grisaia: Phantom Trigger	Tohka Shishigaya		Tweet
2020	Asteroid in Love	Sayuri Ibe		Tweet
2020	Super HxEros	Panchuu		Tweet
2020	Assault Lily: Bouquet	Riri Hitotsuyanagi		
2020	Warlords of Sigrdrifa	Miyako Muguruma		
2021	Sakura Wars the Animation	Azami Mochizuki		
2021	Gleipnir	Aiko		Tweet
2021	Adachi and Shimamura	Yashiro Chikama		
2021	Magatsu Wahrheit Zuerst	Irma		
2021	The Duke of Death and His Maid	Caph		
2021	The Detective is Already Dead	Fubuki Shirakami	Ep. 3	
2021	Otherside Picnic	Kozakura		
2021	Mieruko-chan	Hana		
2022	Girls' Frontline	MP5		
2022	Trapped in a Dating Sim: The World of Otome Games Is Tough for Mobs	Marie		
2022	Estab Life: Great Escape	Martes		
2022	Heroines Run the Show	Hiyori		
2022	Smile of the Arsnotoria the Animation	Voyniy		
2022	The Devil Is a Part-Timer!	Alas Ramus	Season 2	
2022	The Girl from the Other Side: Siúil, a Rún	Shiva		
2022–present	Chainsaw Man	Power		
2023	The Iceblade Sorcerer Shall Rule the World	Claris Cleveland		
2023	KamiKatsu	Mitama		
2023–2026	The 100 Girlfriends Who Really, Really, Really, Really, Really Love You	Hakari Hanazono		
2024	Re:Monster	Aoi		
2024	Alya Sometimes Hides Her Feelings in Russian	Nonoa Miyamae		Tweet
2024	Demon Lord 2099	Machina Soleige		
2025	I May Be a Guild Receptionist, But I'll Solo Any Boss to Clock Out on Time	Laila		
2025	Failure Frame	Slei		
2025	The Unaware Atelier Master	Mimico		
2025	New Saga	Sildonia		
2025	My Status as an Assassin Obviously Exceeds the Hero's	Amelia		
2026	Medalist	Kurumi Risu	Season 2	
2026–present	Tune In to the Midnight Heart	Iko Kirino		
2026–present	Witch Hat Atelier	Tetia		

=== Film ===
List of voice performances in film
Year	Title	Role	Notes	Source
2015	A Certain Magical Index: The Movie – The Miracle of Endymion	Jane Elves		Website
2020	The Island of Giant Insects	Ai Inō		
2022	Teasing Master Takagi-san: The Movie	Takagi		

=== Video games ===
List of voice performances in video games
Year	Title	Role	Notes	Source
2015	HuniePop	Celeste Luvendass		Website
2016	HunieCam Studio	Lailani Kealoha		
2018	Dragon Ball Xenoverse 2	Zeno		
2019	Borderlands 3	Prisa		
2021	HuniePop 2: Double Date	Lailani Kealoha		
2022	Cookie Run: Kingdom	Cherry Blossom Cookie		
2022	Tiny Tina's Wonderlands	Cultist Female	Voice	
2023	Octopath Traveler II	Castti Florenz		
2023	Goddess of Victory: Nikke	Blanc	Credited in-game	
2023	Honkai: Star Rail	Fu Xuan		
2024	Zenless Zone Zero	Vivian Banshee		Tweet

=== Animation ===
List of voice performances in animation
Year	Title	Role	Notes	Source
2025	To Be Hero X	Loli		
