= Lily Hoshikawa =

Fictional character in Zombie Land Saga

- Zombie Land Saga character
- First appearance: Zombie Land Saga, episode 1: "Good Morning SAGA"
- Created by: MAPPA
- Portrayed by: Riri Takanashi (stage play)
- Voiced by: Japanese; Minami Tanaka; English; Sarah Wiedenheft

In-universe information
- Full name: Lily Hoshikawa (currently); Masao Go (deadname)
- Aliases: Number 6 (6号, Roku-gō)
- Species: Human (deceased); Zombie (currently)
- Gender: Transgender girl
- Occupation: Child actress Idol
- Family: Takeo Go (father)

Lily Hoshikawa (Japanese: 星川 リリィ, Hepburn: Hoshikawa Ririi) is a fictional character from the Japanese anime series Zombie Land Saga. She was created by the team at production studio MAPPA and in particular series composition writer Shigeru Murakoshi and producer Nobuhiro Takenaka, who developed her character. She is voiced by Minami Tanaka in Japanese and Sarah Wiedenheft in the anime's English dub and played by Riri Takanashi in the stage play of the series.

Within the anime's narrative, Lily is introduced as one of several deceased young girls who have been resurrected as zombies to form an idol group which aims to revitalize the declining Saga Prefecture. She is later revealed in the series to be a transgender girl and former television child actor, who died at a young age from the shock of witnessing the prepubescent growth of facial hair on her body.

Lily's character has been well received by critics, who have praised her inclusion within Zombie Land Saga as a positive example of transgender representation. She has also appeared in internet memes, most notably a crudely edited image depicting her holding a gun which features the caption "Shut the fuck up, TERF".

== Fictional character biography ==
Lily first appears in Zombie Land Saga's first episode "Good Morning SAGA", where she is introduced as one of several deceased young girls who have been resurrected as zombies in order to feature in the idol group Franchouchou which aims to revitalize the declining Saga Prefecture. Within the group, she is publicly known as Number 6 (6号, Roku-gō), one of several number aliases used by the girls in order to disguise their true identities.

Her backstory is later explored in the episode "Go Go Neverland SAGA" (Note: GOGO ネバーランド SAGA (GOGO Nebārando SAGA)) (first aired on November 22, 2018), when she is recognized and approached by her father and past manager, Takeo Go. Lily was previously a child actor with the masculine name Masao Go, who later changed her gender presentation to female in accordance with her gender identity as a transgender girl, and adopted the new name Lily Hoshikawa. While struggling with her father's strict expectations during her stressful television career, Lily died at 12 years old from shock and embarrassment after finding a strand of facial hair growing on her body. Lily's father mourns her death, regretting the pressure he put on her to grow up.

The other members of Franchouchou are supportive of Lily, as they assure her that learning she is transgender will not change how they treat her. Lily expresses that she is glad to have been resurrected as a zombie as now she will never grow older and experience the gender dysphoria that puberty would otherwise cause her. Lily is initially resentful of Takeo for having placed such strict expectations on her, but realizes how much he cared for her in hindsight. She wishes to acknowledge this to him, but Lily is unable to openly acknowledge Takeo as her father due to Franchouchou's commitment to keeping their identities as zombies a secret from the world. As such, Franchouchou invites Takeo to a special concert where Lily performs a song to give him a proper goodbye. Lily plays a major role in the fifth episode of the series' second season, Zombie Land Saga Revenge, "Little Bodda Bope SAGA", in which she competes on a talent competition television program against fellow child actor Light Oozora, with whom she has a professional rivalry.

== Development ==
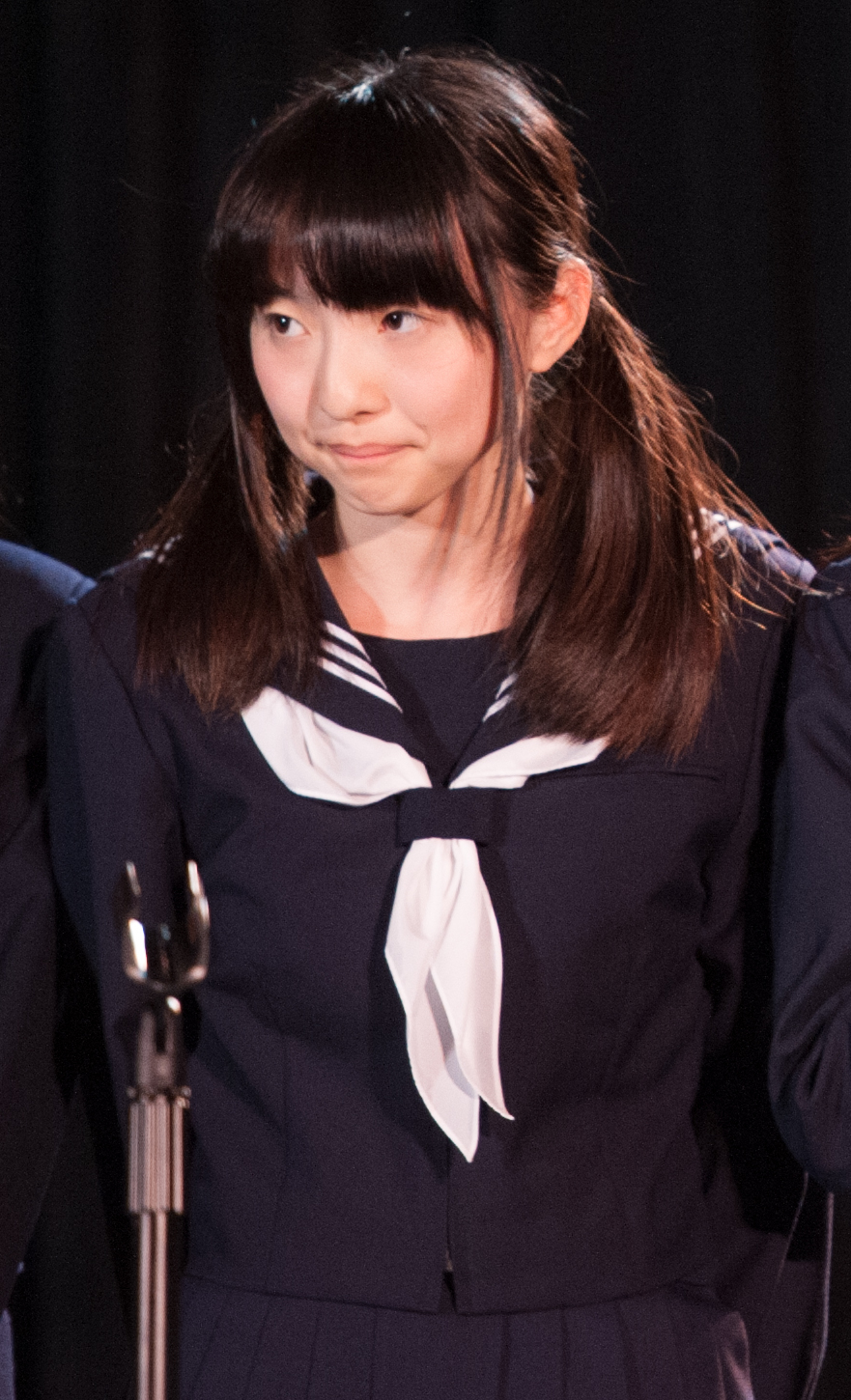
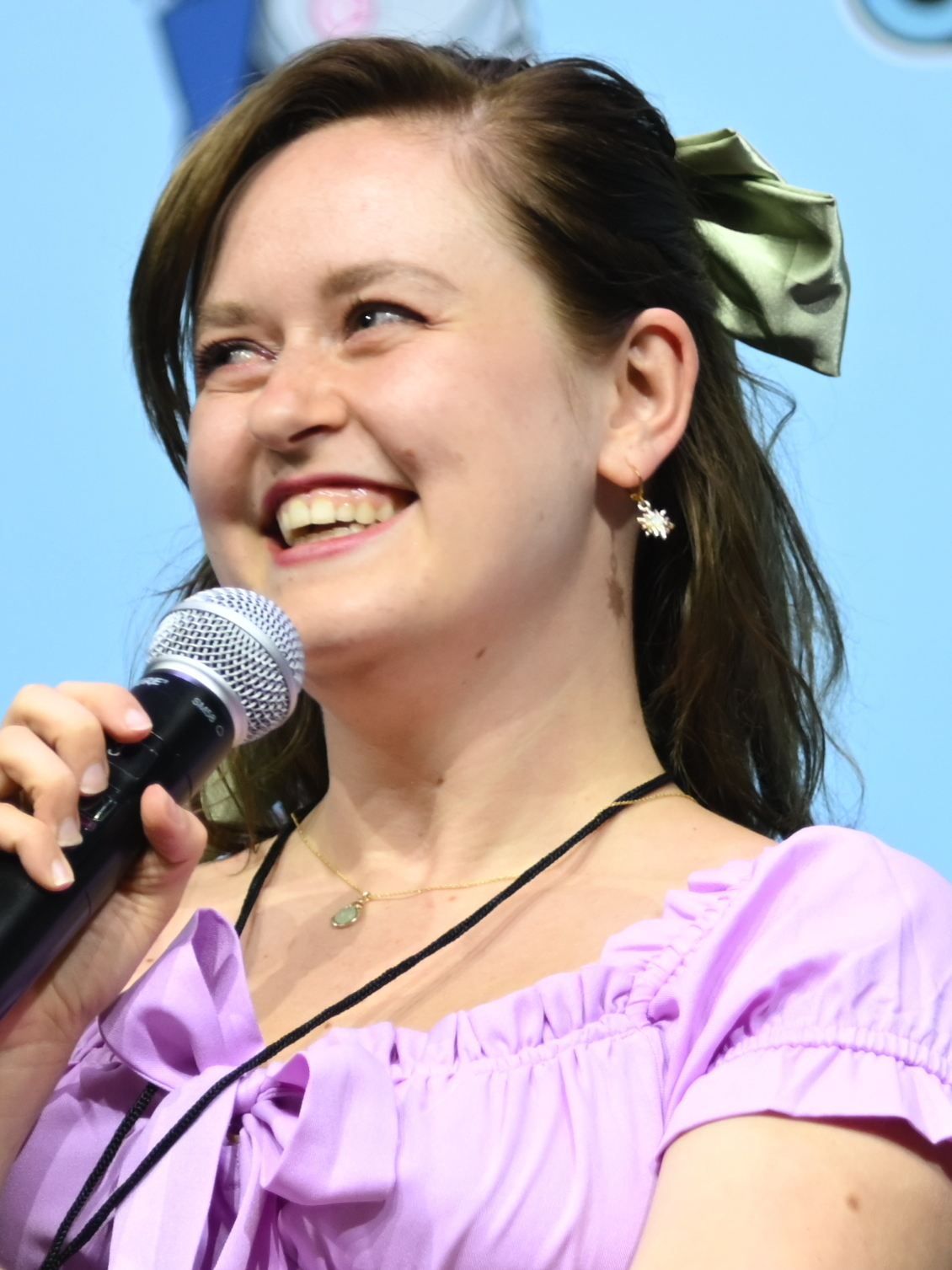
Minami Tanaka (left) and Sarah Wiedenheft (right) have provided the voices of Lily Hoshikawa in their respective languages.

Lily's character was created by Zombie Land Saga's composition writer Shigeru Murakoshi and series producer Nobuhiro Takenaka. In an interview with Mipon, Takenaka and Murakoshi said that they found Lily a difficult character to write due to the challenge in respectfully dealing with the themes of gender in her character arc in the context of the series' comedic tone. Dialogue related to Lily's character, in particular the line in which she openly rejected her previous name "Masao was rewritten multiple times while recording the vocal performances in order to ensure a proper balance between the comedic and serious dramatic elements. Although they acknowledged that the transgender themes were not required for the story, Takenaka said that they chose to feature them in order to set the series apart from other idol anime.

Lily is voiced by Minami Tanaka in the series' original Japanese audio, and Sarah Wiedenheft in the anime's English dub. In the 2020 stage play, Zombie Land Saga: Stage de Dooon!, Riri Takanashi was cast as Lily.

== Cultural impact ==
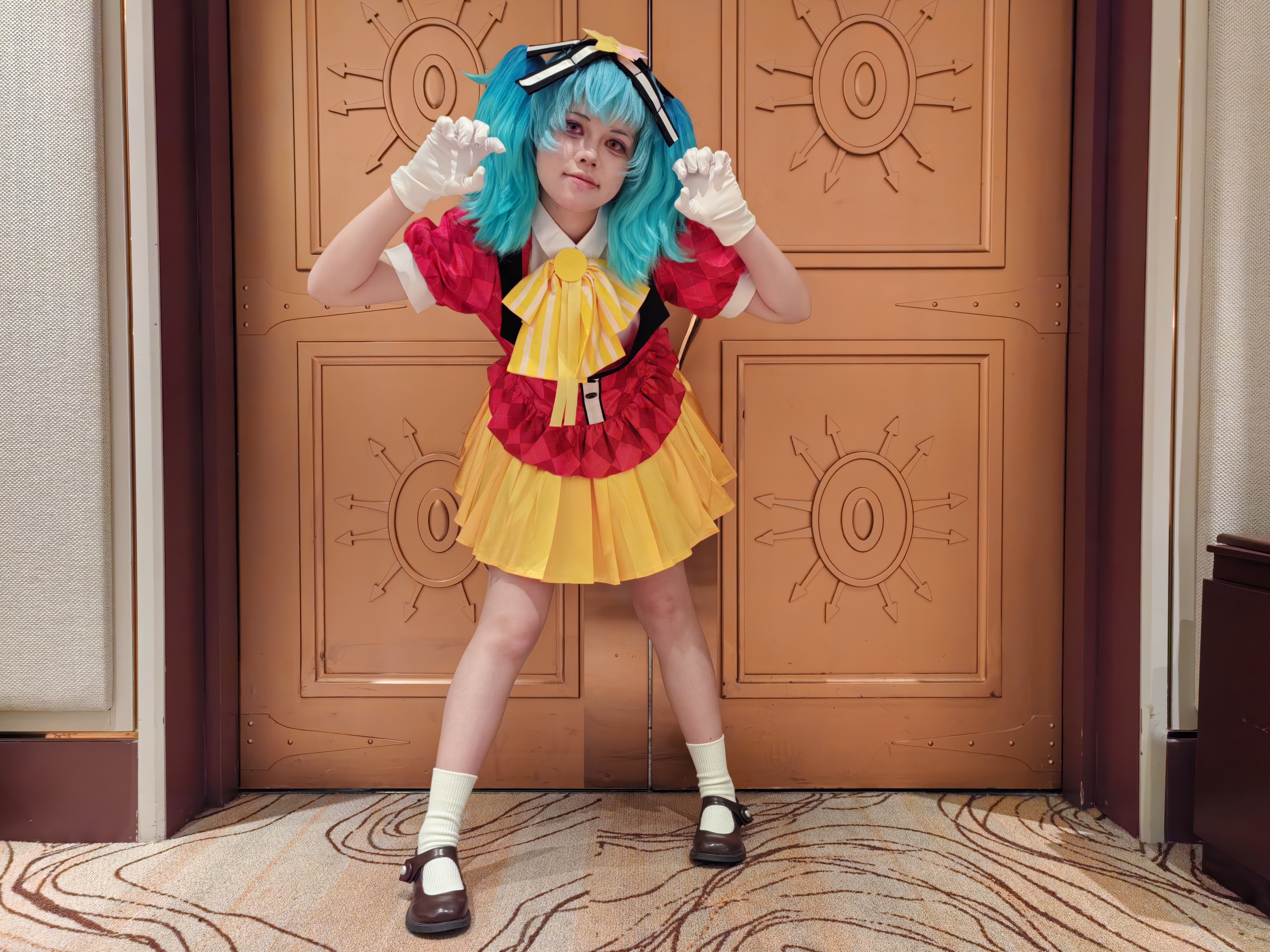
Cosplay of Lily Hoshikawa

=== Critical response ===
The character has been received positively by critics. (Note: Attributed to multiple references:) The sensitivity of Lily's portrayal as a transgender character was highlighted as remarkable, particularly as many other comedy anime had been seen as handling similar characters poorly; anime that were seen to be featuring transgender characters less sensitively, such as Asobi Asobase and You're Under Arrest!, were cited as comparative examples.

In reviewing the eighth episode of the series for Anime News Network, Steve Jones praised Lily's character arc, particularly her relationship with her father, as emotionally moving. However, Jones commented that the comical presentation of Lily's death could come off as trivializing the matter of gender dysphoria, but also acknowledged that it would potentially work for some viewers as a relatable, though absurd, depiction of these experiences. While Jones said that Zombie Land Saga was not a "gold standard" for transgender representation, he nonetheless commended it for its sensitivity. In Anime Feminist (a website focused on reviewing anime from a feminist perspective), Vrai Kaiser similarly praised Lily's inclusion as being a sensitive depiction of a transgender character, but considered her death within the story to be unintentionally callous.

Writing for Crunchyroll, Cayla Coats deemed Lily the "Best Girl" (female character in anime) of 2018, saying she related to the character as a trans woman. In a feature for Crunchyroll, Carlos Cadorniga also wrote that they empathized with Lily's experience of gender dysphoria, and considered it a positive example for future anime featuring trans characters to follow. Lily was nominated for "Best Girl" at the 3rd Crunchyroll Anime Awards in 2019. In Anime Herald, Samantha Ferreira opined that Lily's death was an emotionally resonant depiction of gender dysphoria, and said that she was an example of "desperately needed" transgender representation within anime. In a feature for Otaku USA, Michael Goldstein stated he did not feel qualified to comment on the sensitivity of Lily's death, but generally offered similar praises of her story and character, saying "Who would've thought a zombie show would take deadnaming seriously?" Writing in Neo, Andrew Osmond praised Lily's storyline for avoiding making Lily's trans identity the focal point of her character.

Lily's role in episode 5 of Revenge (the series' second season) was also praised. In his review, Jones complimented the decision to instead focus on guest character Light, as he felt Lily's arc was already generally complete, and also praised her dance number. While Jones felt the episode was not as interesting as the episode that focused on Lily's backstory in the series' first season, he nonetheless praised the continued appeal of Lily's character. Reuben Baron of CBR felt similarly, saying it was enjoyable in spite of not being as memorable as the series' previous Lily-focused episode.

In her book Distancing Representations in Transgender Film, researcher Lucy J. Miller commented positively on Lily. Miller said that Lily differed from other examples of gender-nonconforming characters in anime, typically limited to characters cross-dressing for reasons often unrelated to their gender identity. Additionally, Miller praised how her backstory addressed the "trauma of puberty" common to transgender experiences.

Promotional material in magazines such as Animage has described Lily as "a boy" and touted her deadname Masao (Note: Lily refers to her past name as suteta namae (捨てた名前; lit. 'abandoned name')) as her "real name". This was criticized by Otaquest writer Alicia Haddick, who highlighted the perceived dissonance between the messaging of the anime which affirmed Lily's identity, and the use of her previous name as a "selling point reliant on shock factor". Haddick thus expressed the opinion that despite Lily's positive reception from transgender viewers, her presentation in the series' marketing indicated that there was still progress yet to be made.

=== Audience response ===
Alicia Haddick of Otaquest said that Lily's introduction and the reveal of her transgender identity was positively received by both English and Japanese-speaking audiences who posted about her appearance on Twitter. Haddick also reported that the public display of a meme featuring Lily in the UK Parliament prompted discussion of transgender issues amongst Japanese Twitter users. Ana Valens of The Daily Dot also highlighted positive responses to Lily from Twitter users, although she also commented on conflict between fans of the character and viewers who expressed skepticism about her transgender identity, which became a matter of dispute on the talk page of the series' English Wikipedia article. Online detractors often falsely suggested that Lily's gender identity or status as a trans character was an embellishment by the writers of the English subtitles, or referred to her using the pejorative term "trap". Carlos Cadorniga, an anime critic writer who wrote an article for Crunchyroll's news column praising Lily's character, responded to such commentary in relation to their article in an op-ed for Popdust. Cadorniga was offended by the term's application to Lily and said it "discredits the impact" of Lily's story.

Lily's deadname Masao appeared on a list of popular anime buzzwords in Gadget Tsūshin.

=== Use in internet memes ===
The "Shut the fuck up TERF" image macro featuring Lily

Lily's image has been adopted into internet memes. The most notable such meme was a photoshopped image which crudely depicts her holding a gun, with a caption spelt in stylized lettering that reads, "Shut the fuck up TERF", generally used by social media users voicing their support of the transgender rights movement. In April 2019, a Twitter user sent the image as a reply to British journalist Helen Lewis in relation to a dispute that she had been engaging in with professional esports player Dominique 'SonicFox' McLean, after McLean referred to Lewis as a TERF. Lewis responded by tweeting a screenshot of the reply, which she criticized as a perceived death threat and suggested it was in violation of Twitter's terms of service.

Joanna Cherry presenting the meme at the UK Parliament.

On May 1, 2019, Scottish MP Joanna Cherry referenced the reply to Lewis while questioning a Twitter employee on how the platform handled cases of online abuse during a Parliamentary convening of the Human Rights Committee. During this meeting, she physically presented a printed out copy of the meme, featuring Lily. Cherry described the meme as an obscene and misogynist threat, while incorrectly quoting its text as "Shut the fuck up, cunt". Cherry was later criticized by McLean for her "disingenuous" characterization of the related conflict. In an Anime News Network article covering the meme's unexpected public display, Andrew Osmond described it as "surely one of the strangest public representations of anime in history". Reviewer Steve Jones commented on the event in his review of the fifth episode of Zombie Land Saga Revenge, characterizing it as a surreal incident which sounded like it could have been a plot point in an episode of the series.

On January 29, 2023, the meme was posted on Twitter by J. K. Rowling, who likened it to a piece of anti-suffragist art from the early twentieth century.

== See also ==
- List of animated series with LGBT characters
- Stop!! Hibari-kun!
- Wandering Son
