= Zombie Land Saga =

Japanese anime television series

- Key visual

ゾンビランドサガ (Zonbi Rando Saga)
- Genre: Comedy horror
- Created by: Public Relation Section, Zombie Division
- Anime television series
- Directed by: Munehisa Sakai
- Written by: Shigeru Murakoshi
- Music by: Yasuharu Takanashi; Funta7
- Studio: MAPPA
- Licensed by: Crunchyroll: SA/SEA: Medialink
- Original network: AT-X, Tokyo MX, SUN, BS11, Saga TV, TVQ
- English network: SEA: Aniplus Asia
- Original run: October 4, 2018 – December 20, 2018
- Episodes: 12
- Manga
- Written by: Megumu Soramichi
- Published by: Cygames
- Imprint: Cycomi x Ura Shonen Sunday Comics
- Magazine: Cycomi
- Original run: October 8, 2018 – June 1, 2021
- Volumes: 4
- Anime television series

Zombie Land Saga Revenge
- Directed by: Munehisa Sakai
- Written by: Shigeru Murakoshi
- Music by: Yasuharu Takanashi; Funta7
- Studio: MAPPA
- Licensed by: Crunchyroll: SA/SEA: Muse Communication
- Original network: AT-X, Tokyo MX, SUN, TVQ, Saga TV, BS11
- Original run: April 8, 2021 – June 24, 2021
- Episodes: 12
- Manga

Zombie Land Saga Gaiden: The First Zombie
- Illustrated by: Kasumi Fukagawa
- Published by: Shueisha
- Magazine: Ultra Jump
- Original run: May 19, 2021 – November 17, 2022
- Volumes: 3
- Anime film
- Zombie Land Saga: Yumeginga Paradise (2025)
- icon

Zombie Land Saga (Japanese: ゾンビランドサガ, Hepburn: Zonbi Rando Saga) is an anime television series produced by MAPPA, Avex Pictures and Cygames. The series aired in Japan between October and December 2018. A second season titled Zombie Land Saga Revenge aired between April and June 2021. An anime film project, titled Zombie Land Saga: Yumeginga Paradise, was released in October 2025. A manga adaptation that loosely follows the events of the anime, ran on Cygames' Cycomi website from October 2018 to June 2021; a spinoff series which focused on Tae's exploits during her previous life, titled Zombie Land Saga Sidestory: The First Zombie, ran in Ultra Jump magazine from May 2021 to November 2022.

== Plot ==
In the year 2008, high school student Sakura Minamoto is abruptly killed by a truck on the morning she plans to submit an idol application. Ten years later, Sakura, along with six "legendary" girls from various eras of Japan's history, are brought back as zombies by a man named Kotaro Tatsumi, who seeks to revitalize Saga Prefecture by putting together an all-zombie idol group that would become known as Franchouchou.

== Characters ==
=== Franchouchou ===
Franchouchou (フランシュシュ, Furanshushu) (Note: The name is a play on the Japanese phrase Furanshūshū (腐乱臭衆), meaning "Decomposing Smell Group".) is an idol group founded by Kotaro Tatsumi and composed of seven legendary idols from different time periods that he brought back to life as zombies with the goal of reviving Saga's declining idol business. Because of the possibility of being persecuted should their identities be exposed, they perform using aliases and hide their zombified states using makeup.

Sakura Minamoto (源 さくら, Minamoto Sakura)
Voiced by: Kaede Hondo (Japanese); Brina Palencia (English)
Portrayed by: Sakiho Motonishi
A high school girl and aspiring idol who dies in 2008 after being hit by a truck following a life filled with misfortune. She is the first of the zombies to regain consciousness after being resurrected, but initially retained no recollection of her life, only remembering parts of her past when she performs. Near the group's performance at Arpino, she fully regained her memory, only to lose her previous memories as a zombie and subsequently fell into a depression due to her misfortunes in the past. However, she was able to pull through with the help of her teammates. Her idol nickname is Number 1 (1号, Ichi-gō).
Saki Nikaido (二階堂 サキ, Nikaidō Saki)
Voiced by: Asami Tano (Japanese); Caitlin Glass (English)
Portrayed by: Yuriya Suzuki
A delinquent girl and leading member of the all-female biker gang Dorami, which conquered the entire Kyushu region before her death during a chicken race in 1997. She is the appointed leader of Franchouchou. Her idol nickname is Number 2 (2号, Ni-gō).
Ai Mizuno (水野 愛, Mizuno Ai)
Voiced by: Risa Taneda (Japanese); Bryn Apprill (English)
Portrayed by: Rie Matsuoka
The former lead performer of Iron Frill, a 2000s idol group Sakura idolized in life, who was killed after being struck by lightning during a concert in 2008. Not wanting to be remembered only for her tragic death, she resolves to work hard in her second chance at life. In Revenge, the current incarnation of Iron Frill invite her to join them, but she ultimately turns them down in favor of staying with Franchouchou. Her idol nickname is Number 3 (3号, San-gō).
Junko Konno (紺野 純子, Konno Junko)
Voiced by: Maki Kawase (Japanese); Amanda Lee (English)
Portrayed by: Yūna Kitahara
A soft-spoken idol from the Shōwa period who was popular during the 1980s before dying in a plane crash in 1983. Coming from an era without social media, she has reservations towards personally interacting with her fans. She is sometimes seen playing an acoustic guitar, but can also play electric. Her idol nickname is Number 4 (4号, Yon-gō).
Yugiri (ゆうぎり, Yūgiri)
Voiced by: Rika Kinugawa (Japanese); Stephanie Young (English)
Portrayed by: Mioka Sakamoto
An oiran who lived between the Bakumatsu and the Meiji Restoration eras in the 19th century. In Revenge it is revealed that she was executed in 1882 after taking the blame for organizing a rebellion to restore Saga's statehood, which had been revoked at the time. Her idol nickname is Number 5 (5号, Go-gō).
Lily Hoshikawa (星川 リリィ, Hoshikawa Ririi)
Voiced by: Minami Tanaka (Japanese); Sarah Wiedenheft (English)
Portrayed by: Riri Takanashi
A prodigious, transgender child actress who died in 2011 from a heart attack caused by a combination of occupational stress and gender dysphoria. She has no qualms about being a zombie, seeing it as a way to continue being a child forever, and will never have to go through puberty. Her idol nickname is Number 6 (6号, Roku-gō).
Tae Yamada (山田 たえ, Yamada Tae)
Voiced by: Kotono Mitsuishi (Japanese); Dawn M. Bennett (English)
Portrayed by: Asami Morita
The only zombie who has yet to regain human consciousness. She is the one who officially names the group Franchouchou, which is derived from her sneezing. In The First Zombie, it is revealed that, in her previous life, she was an office worker with a secret double-life as a demon slaying exorcist and the previous owner of the mansion where Franchouchou now lives. Her idol nickname is Number 0 (0号, Zero-gō).

=== Supporting characters ===
Kotaro Tatsumi (巽 幸太郎, Tatsumi Kōtarō)
Voiced by: Mamoru Miyano (Japanese); Ricco Fajardo (English)
Portrayed by: Noriyuki Ohashi
A manic producer and necromancer who resurrects Sakura and the other girls to "save" Saga by forming the idol group Franchouchou. He is eventually revealed to be Sakura's former high school classmate Inui (乾), who wanted to make her dream come true. While the meaning of his intention to "save" Saga initially seemed to be simply to revitalize the struggling prefecture, it is revealed in Revenge that he meant it literally, as the land is prophesied to face disaster.
Romero (ロメロ)
Voiced by: Yasuhiro Takato (Japanese); Alejandro Saab (English)
Kotaro's undead pet toy poodle. His name is a reference to film director George Romero.
Police Officer A (警察官A, Keisatsukan A)
Voiced by: Hiroyuki Yoshino (Japanese); Austin Tindle (English)
An unnamed police officer who repeatedly encounters Sakura and the other undead girls.

=== Related with Franchouchou ===
Uncle Death A and Uncle Death B (デスおじ, Desu Oji)
Voiced by: Mitsuaki Kanuka & Setsuji Satō (Japanese); Mike McFarland & Cris George (English)
Two metalheads who are Franchouchou's first fans. Uncle Death A is fat and shorter while Uncle Death B is lean and taller. They can be seen in the audience in all of the girls' concerts. The english dub credits them as “Bulk and Skull”, a reference to the show Mighty Morphin Power Rangers. These names are primarily used in the credits and are not referenced directly in the show's dialogue.
Takeo Go (豪 剛雄, Gō Takeo)
Voiced by: Tsuyoshi Koyama (Japanese); Christopher Sabat (English)
The ex-manager and widowed father of Lily. He is a large man whose face is often mistaken for that of a yakuza. The scar on his left eye is a product of scratching his face in despair at his daughter's death.
Sachiko Go (郷さちか, Gō Sachika)
The late mother of Lily and the wife and former classmate of Takeo Go. She is a young student who appreciates flowers very much. She is the first to see that Takeo is someone strong on the outside but kind on the inside and who cares for others. She is not afraid of Takeo, since she is not afraid of someone who takes care of the flowers. Deep down, she has a crush on him and accepts his future marriage proposal instantly, even when they were in high school. She died when Lily was young.
Reiko Amabuki (天吹 麗子, Amabuki Reiko)
Voiced by: Komina Matsushita (Japanese); Colleen Clinkenbeard (English)
First captain of the motorcycle gang Dorami (怒羅美), who retired to give birth to Maria and lead a normal life. She saves a photo with Saki along with her old Tamagotchi and motorcycle.
Maria Amabuki (天吹 万梨阿, Amabuki Maria)
Voiced by: Aoi Koga (Japanese); Madeleine Morris (English)
The daughter of Reiko Amabuki, whom she was once rebellious towards, as she thought the latter was nothing but a spineless wimp for leaving the gang in favor of becoming a housewife. She is the leader of the current Dorami Dance Team (ダンスチーム怒羅美, Dansuchīmu Dorami) and works part-time at a grocery store.
Arata Okoba (大古場 新太, Ōkoba Arata)
Voiced by: Tōru Nara (Japanese); Kent Williams (English)
A chief reporter who works alongside his photographer Inubashiri (犬走). Both begin investigating Franchouchou after recognizing Junko in the Drive-in Tori commercial.
Xu Fu (徐福, Jofuku)
Voiced by: Hōchū Ōtsuka (Japanese); R. Bruce Elliot (English)
The bartender of Bar New Jofuku who is personally familiar with Kotaro, Yugiri, and the Zombie Land Saga Project. It is revealed in Revenge that his immortality is linked to the status of Saga. His name and the bar's name references Chinese medical scholar Xu Fu, named "Jofuku" in Japanese, who was ordered by Qin Shi Huang to find the elixir of life.
Maimai Yuzuriha (楪 舞々, Yuzuriha Maimai)
Voiced by: Kana Hanazawa (Japanese); Cherami Leigh (English)
A high school girl and avid fan of Franchouchou to who discovers the zombies' identities after Kotaro attempts to recruit her, mistakenly thinking that he killed her. She temporarily joins the group as Number 7 (7号, Nana-gō) in Revenge.
Kiichi Momozaki (百崎 喜一, Momozaki Kiichi)
Voiced by: Mamoru Miyano (Japanese); Ricco Fajardo (English)
An idealistic but naive young man that lived in the same period as Yugiri, and eventually fell in love with her, who wished to start a revolution to restore Saga as a prefecture. When most of his comrades were killed by Ito, he was rescued by Yugiri and put under the protection of some of her connections. Thanks to that, he was able to start the restoration and eventually succeeded. Him and his grandfather are Kotaro's ancestors.
Shojiro Ito (伊東 正次郎, Itō Shōjirō)
Voiced by: Koki Uchiyama (Japanese); Adam Gibbs (English)
Kiichi's best friend who secretly worked as a government spy to keep an eye on the rebels. Unlike Kiichi, Ito is more cynical and usually disapproves of Kiichi's plans of revolution. After killing most of the rebels he betrayed Kiichi and tried to kill him before being stopped by Yugiri. He was then killed by Yugiri after he tried to chase them. On death's door, he revealed that in truth he always wanted a Saga that Kiichi described.

== Media ==
=== Anime ===
Cygames announced the series, in collaboration with Avex Pictures, on July 5, 2018. The series is directed by Munehisa Sakai and written by Shigeru Murakoshi, with animation by studio MAPPA. The series' character designs are provided by Kasumi Fukagawa, Kazuo Ogura is the art director, Takashi Yanagida is serving as director of photography, Azusa Sasaki is the color designer, and Masahiro Goto is editing the series. Yasuharu Takanashi is composing the series' music, which is produced by Avex Pictures, while dugout is producing the sound. The opening and ending theme songs respectively are "Adabana Necromancy" (徒花ネクロマンシー, Adabana Nekuromanshī; lit. "Fruitless Necromancy") and "Hikari e" (光へ; lit. "To the Light"), both performed by Franchouchou. The 12-episode series aired between October 4 and December 20, 2018, and was broadcast on AT-X, Tokyo MX, Sun TV, BS11, Saga TV, and TVQ. The series was simulcast outside of Asia with Japanese audio and English subtitles by Crunchyroll and with English audio by Funimation. An uncut version of the dub that translates the main songs from the anime series was eventually released by Funimation at the end of 2019.

Medialink licensed the first season in Asia-Pacific, and streamed it on Netflix, Aniplus Asia, and Bilibili, while Muse Communication holds the distribution rights to the second season.

The opening and ending themes were both released as singles paired with "FANTASTIC LOVERS" and "Jellyfish" (respectively, both sung by Iron Frill, Ai Mizuno's in-universe pre-Franchouchou idol group) on November 28, 2018, and they charted at #13 and #19 (respectively) in the Oricon Singles Chart on December 10, while the opening theme single topped the Billboard Japan Download Songs chart on the same day.

On July 27, 2019, it was announced that the series is getting renewed for a second season, titled Zombie Land Saga Revenge. On February 27, 2021, it was revealed that MAPPA would animate the new season, which aired from on April 8 to June 24, 2021, on AT-X and other channels. Tatsuro Onishi and Momoko Mifune replace Kazuo Ogura and Takashi Yanagida as art director and director of photography. The remaining cast and staff return to reprise their roles. The opening and ending theme songs respectively are "Taiga yo Tomo ni Naite Kure" (大河よ共に泣いてくれ; lit. "O Saga, Cry With Me") and "Yume o Te ni, Modoreru Basho mo Nai Hibi o" (夢を手に、戻れる場所もない日々を; lit. "Spending The Days With a Dream and Nowhere to Go Home"), both performed by Franchouchou. Crunchyroll streamed the series with subtitles, and Funimation streamed the series dubbed in English.

On October 17, 2021, it was announced that the series would be receiving an anime film project. The film, titled Zombie Land Saga: Yumeginga Paradise, was released on October 24, 2025.

=== Manga ===
A manga adaptation by Megumu Soramichi began serialization on Cygames' Cycomi website on October 8, 2018. An anthology manga featuring chapters by various artists was released on April 7, 2021. A spinoff manga series focusing on the past of Tae Yamada, illustrated by character designer Kasumi Fukagawa, was serialized in Shueisha's seinen manga magazine Ultra Jump from May 19, 2021, to November 17, 2022.

=== Other ===
A stage play based on the first seven episodes of the anime, Zombie Land Saga Stage de Do-n!, was performed on September 4 and 5, 2020; it had been scheduled for March 11 to 14 before being delayed due to the COVID-19 pandemic in Japan.

In June 2021, the mobile rhythm game BanG Dream! Girls Band Party! held a collaboration event with Zombie Land Saga. The partnership included a special story and themed cards for the in-game band Pastel＊Palettes, who also performed a cover version of "Adabana Necromancy". Fellow band Poppin'Party covered "Taiga yo Tomo ni Naite Kure". Kotaro makes an appearance in the event, for which Miyano reprises his role.

On December 28, 2022, a special program was aired on TVQ Kyushu Broadcasting, featuring Roland touring the locales and special places that were featured in the anime, along with narration by main character Sakura's voice actress, Kaede Hondo.

== Reception ==
=== Critical response ===
In Anime News Network's previews of the fall 2018 anime season, Zombie Land Saga's first episode received overall positive responses, with most critics praising the premise and darkly comedic tone. James Beckett expressed that he appreciated the variety teased in the core cast, and found little to critique. Theron Martin, Paul Jensen, and Nick Creamer all gave similarly enthused praises, with generally shared praises for the cleverness of its genre fusion of idol anime and comic horror. Jensen described the episode's early moments as somewhat tonally confused, but stressed that the remainder of the episode was excellent, and described the dialogue and characterization of Sakura and Kotaro as exceptional. The reviewers all gave scores of 4 out of 5 stars, with the exception of Rebecca Silverman, who gave the first episode 3.5 out of 5 stars and characterized it as "off-putting and very morbid," as well as criticizing the show for its excessive use of loud vocal performances and flashing lights, which she said could potentially upset some viewers. Despite these criticisms, Silverman said that Zombie Land Saga was "worth checking out" for the originality of its premise. Writing for Anime Feminist, Vrai Kaiser generally praised the series, saying that while it did not make any "focused" social commentary on the negative aspects of the Japanese idol industry, it was enjoyable for its unconventional premise and sincere storytelling. Kaiser also criticized Kotaro's character, who they said "breaks apart on the lightest scrutiny" due to the disconnect between the "asshole" and "well-meaning, extremely extra uncle" aspects of his character, though they appreciated Mamoru Miyano's vocal performance.

The character of Lily Hoshikawa has received substantial praise from critics and audiences as a positive example of transgender representation.

=== Cultural impact ===
During a May 2019 session of the UK Parliamentary Joint Committee on Human Rights where executives from Facebook and Twitter were questioned concerning their policies on abuse and harassment, Scottish National Party MP Joanna Cherry physically displayed a printed copy of a meme, reading, "Shut the fuck up, TERF," which featured Lily Hoshikawa.

On August 12, 2019, the special Natsu no Saga, a documentary on the anime, featured governor of Saga Yoshinori Yamaguchi cosplaying as major character Kotaro Tatsumi.

Gadget Tsūshin listed "nice bird" (referring to the fifth episode) and "Masao" (Lily's deadname) in their 2019 anime buzzwords list.

In May 2021, Zombie Land Saga was one of five anime titles (along with KonoSuba, That Time I Got Reincarnated as a Slime, Princess Lover!, and Nekopara) that were given a limited ban by the Russian government for their depiction of reincarnation, which was thought to encourage suicide by lawmakers.

=== Awards and nominations ===
Year	Award	Category	Recipient	Result	Ref.
2019	3rd Crunchyroll Anime Awards	Anime of the Year	Zombie Land Saga	Nominated	
2019	3rd Crunchyroll Anime Awards	Best Boy	Kotaro Tatsumi	Nominated	
2019	3rd Crunchyroll Anime Awards	Best Girl	Lily Hoshikawa	Nominated	
2019	3rd Crunchyroll Anime Awards	Best Character Design	Kasumi Fukagawa, original design by Hiroshi Shimizu	Nominated	
2019	3rd Crunchyroll Anime Awards	Best Voice Artist Performance (Japanese)	Mamoru Miyano as Kotaro Tatsumi	Won	
2019	Tokyo Anime Award Festival	Animation of the Year (Television)	Zombie Land Saga	Won	
