= Ayaka Fukuhara =

Japanese voice actress

- 福原 綾香
- Born: December 31, 1989 (age 36); Kagoshima Prefecture, Japan
- Occupation: Voice actress
- Years active: 2012–present
- Agent: Across Entertainment
- Notable work: The Idolmaster Cinderella Girls as Rin Shibuya; Qualidea Code as Hotaru Rindō; Mega Man 11 and Mega Man X DiVE as Mega Man; WarioWare as Ashley; Genshin Impact as Dehya; Rock Is a Lady's Modesty as Tina Isemi; Kakegurui as Sayaka Igarashi
- Height: 163 cm (5 ft 4 in)
- Spouse: Reo Nakanishi (m. 2020)

Ayaka Fukuhara (福原 綾香, Fukuhara Ayaka; born December 31, 1989) is a Japanese voice actress from Kagoshima Prefecture affiliated with the agency Across Entertainment. After aspiring to become a voice actress early in life, she made her acting debut in 2012 as the character Rin Shibuya in The Idolmaster Cinderella Girls franchise. She is also known for her roles as Myoko in Arpeggio of Blue Steel and Hotaru Rindō in Qualidea Code.

== Biography ==
Fukuhara was born in Kagoshima Prefecture on December 31, 1989. Early in life, she dreamed of becoming a veterinarian, but after listening to a radio drama adaptation of the manga series Hunter × Hunter, she became aware of the occupation of voice acting, and decided to pursue that career track instead. She then took correspondence training lessons to improve her voice skills, while also reading manga aloud in order to practice her acting skills. In high school, she was a member of her school's broadcasting club; she later participated in the national radio contest sponsored by NHK, becoming the first student of her school to make it to the contest, although she was unable to win any award. At the urging of her parents, she took a degree in nutrition at a university, while also attending the Japan Narration Acting Institute (日本ナレーション演技研究所). During her time at the training school, she became part of the voice acting agency VIMS.

In 2012, she made her voice acting debut as the character Rin Shibuya in the video game The Idolmaster Cinderella Girls. She graduated from university the following year. She would then play mainly supporting or background roles in anime until 2015 when she was cast as the character Myōkō in the anime film Arpeggio of Blue Steel: Ars Nova DC. She also reprised the role of Rin for the anime adaptation of The Idolmaster Cinderella Girls. In 2016, she was cast as the character Grea in the anime series Rage of Bahamut: Manaria Friends, and Hotaru Rindō in the anime series Qualidea Code. In 2017, she played the roles of Sayaka Igarashi in Kakegurui – Compulsive Gambler, and Kasumi Ayase in the anime series Dies Irae. She played the role of Tarō Misaki in a new television series adaptation of the manga series Captain Tsubasa in 2018. That same year, she was cast as Mega Man in the video game Mega Man 11.

On October 25, 2020, Fukuhara announced she has married fellow voice actor Reo Nakanishi.

On January 6, 2022, Fukuhara announced that she has transferred to Across Entertainment, after leaving VIMS on November 30, 2021.

== Filmography ==
=== Anime ===
List of voice performances in anime
Year	Title	Role	Notes	Source
2013	Duel Masters: Victory V3	Jenny No. 1		
2013	Arata: The Legend	Nao Hinohara		
2013	Love Lab	Maki's older sister		
2013	Rozen Maiden	High school girl		
2013	WataMote	School nurse		
2014	Jinsei	Mari Kurokawa		
2014	Trinity Seven	Lugh		
2014	A Good Librarian Like a Good Shepherd	Female student E, Chairman		
2015–2019	The Idolmaster Cinderella Girls	Rin Shibuya	Also Theater	
2016	Mysterious Joker	Ray	Season 3	
2016	Super Lovers	Nozomi Anzai		
2016	Qualidea Code	Hotaru Rindō		
2016	ViVid Strike!	Lyra Caprice		
2017–2019	Kakegurui – Compulsive Gambler	Sayaka Igarashi	Also Kakegurui ××	
2017	Dies irae	Kasumi Ayase		
2018	Captain Tsubasa	Tarō Misaki	2018 TV Series	
2019	Manaria Friends	Grea		
2019	Fairy Gone	Veronica Thorn		
2020	Smile Down the Runway	Kaoru Kizaki		
2020	Sakura Wars: The Animation	Anastasia Palma		
2021	LBX Girls	Miharu		
2021	Tropical-Rouge! Pretty Cure	Yuriko Shiratori		
2022	Irodorimidori	Aliciana Ogata		
2022	Princess Connect! Re:Dive Season 2	Chika		
2022	Girls' Frontline	RO635		
2022	Shikimori's Not Just a Cutie	Kamiya		
2022	Extreme Hearts	Yukino Tachibana		
2023	You Were Experienced, I Was Not: Our Dating Story	Nikoru Yamana		
2024	Yatagarasu: The Raven Does Not Choose Its Master	Masuho no Susuki		
2024	Plus-Sized Elf	Oga		
2025	Rock Is a Lady's Modesty	Tina Isemi		
2026	The Klutzy Class Monitor and the Girl with the Short Skirt	Rui Tasaki		
2026	Mebius Dust	Kyōko		

=== Films ===
List of voice performances in feature films
Year	Title	Role	Notes	Source
2015	Arpeggio of Blue Steel: Ars Nova DC	Myōkō	Compilation film	
2015	Arpeggio of Blue Steel -Ars Nova Cadenza-	Myōkō		
2018	Servamp -Alice in the Garden-	Mitsuki Usami		
2023	Collar × Malice -deep cover-	Hisashi Sakuragawa		

=== Video games ===
List of voice performances in video games
Year	Title	Role	Notes	Source
2011	The Idolmaster Cinderella Girls	Rin Shibuya	Debut role	
2014	Granblue Fantasy	Rin Shibuya, Grea		
2015	Princess Connect! Re:Dive	Chika Misumi		
2015	Irodorimidori	Aliciana Ogata		
2015	The Idolmaster Cinderella Girls: Starlight Stage	Rin Shibuya		
2016	Girls' Frontline	G11, RO635		
2016	Collar × Malice	Hisashi Sakuragawa		
2017	Azur Lane	KMS Scharnhorst, KMS Bismarck, KMS U-556		
2018	The King of Fighters XIV	Najd		
2018	WarioWare Gold	Ashley, Amy		
2018	Captain Tsubasa Zero: Miracle Shoot	Taro Misaki		
2018	Dragalia Lost	Cibella		
2018	Mega Man 11	Mega Man		
2018	Dragon Star Varnir	Karikaro		
2019	The Curse of Kudan	Sakuya Kudan		
2019	Sakura Wars	Anastasia Palma		
2019	Arknights	Meteor/Nasti		
2020	Captain Tsubasa: Rise of New Champions	Taro Misaki		
2021	Nier Reincarnation	Gayle/Frenrizé フレンリーゼ (Furenrīze)		
2021	DC Super Hero Girls: Teen Power	Green Lantern / Jessica Cruz		
2021	WarioWare: Get It Together!	Ashley		
2021	Umamusume: Pretty Derby	Seeking the Pearl		
2022	Genshin Impact	Dehya		
2022	Path to Nowhere	Zoya		
2023	Street Fighter 6	Manon		
2023	The King of Fighters XV	Najd		
2023	WarioWare: Move It!	Ashley		

=== Dubbing ===
List of voice performances in dub recordings
Year	Title	Role	Notes	Source
2017	High Strung	Ruby	Voice dub for Keenan Kampa	
2018	Wacky Races	Pandora Pitstop	Animation	
2020	DC Super Hero Girls	Green Lantern	Animation	
2020	Dolittle	Lily Dolittle	Voice dub for Kasia Smutniak	
2020	The Addams Family	Candi	Animation	
2021	Space Jam: A New Legacy	Young Malik		
2021	Wrong Turn	Jennifer Shaw	Voice dub for Charlotte Vega	
2021	Shazam!	Mary Bromfield	Voice dub for Grace Fulton and Michelle Borth; 2021 THE CINEMA edition	
2022	Clifford the Big Red Dog	Florence		
2022	Shark Bait	Milly		
