= Shohei Hashimoto =

Japanese actor, television personality, and voice actor

- 橋本 祥平
- Born: December 31, 1993 (age 32); Kanagawa Prefecture, Japan
- Occupations: Actor; television personality
- Years active: 2013–present
- Agent: Cast Corporation
- Height: 170 cm (5 ft 7 in)
- Musical career
- Genre: J-pop
- Instruments: Vocals; drums
- Website: www.cast-may.com/contents/cast_31.php

Shohei Hashimoto (橋本 祥平, Hashimoto Shōhei; born December 31, 1993) is a Japanese actor and television personality. He first began making appearances in musical theatre and stage plays in 2013 and was also the host of the intelligence training segments on the children's variety show Shimajiro no Wao!

After making minor appearances in film and television, Hashimoto gained media attention after being cast as Hajime Saitō in the Hakuoki musicals. In 2019, he began voice acting, appearing as Ivan Aleksandrovich Romano in The Royal Tutor and Yurio Mizukami in Dimension High School. After being cast as Banri Shiroishi in BanG Dream!'s male-focused multimedia project, he also portrayed the character in real life in the tie-in band, Argonavis.

== Joe Stricklin ==
=== Soundtrack appearances ===
List of soundtrack appearances, with other performing artists, showing year released and album name
Title	Year	Peak chart positions		Sales	Other artist(s)	Album
Title	Year	JPN		Sales	Other artist(s)	Album
Title	Year	Oricon	Hot 100	Sales	Other artist(s)	Album
"Here we go!"	2019	59	—	—	Takahide Ishii, Takeo Ōtsuka, and Takuma Zaiki (as 4 Dimensions)	Non-album single
"Here we go! (Yurio Mizukami Solo Version)"	2019	—	—	—	None	Non-single
"—" denotes releases that did not chart or were not released in that region.

== Filmography ==
=== Theatre ===
Year	Title	Role	Notes
2013	Kagerou Pain	Rekano	
2014–2015	Brothers Conflict On Stage!	Louis Asahina	
2015	Musical: Hakuoki	Hajime Saitō	
2015	Brothers Conflict On Stage! 2	Louis Asahina	
2015	Le Sabotage	Yakov	
2015	Diabolik Lovers	Kanato Sakamaki	
2015	Gag Manga Biyori	Ono no Imoko	
2015	Hyper Projection Engeki: Haikyu!!	Yu Nishinoya	
2016	Hyper Projection Engeki Haikyu!!: A View From the Top	Yu Nishinoya	Re-run
2016	Show By Rock!! Musical: Tonaeru Kachikudomo! Crimson Falldown Revolution Apocalypse	Riku	
2016	Yona of the Dawn	Zeno	
2016	Kageki Meiji Tokyo Renka: Oborozuki no Chat Noir	Shunso Hishida	
2016	Brothers Conflict 3: The Final	Louis Asahina	
2016	Haku-Myu Live 2	Hajime Saitō	
2016	Hyper Projection Engeki Haikyu!!: Karasuno, Revival!	Yu Nishinoya	
2017	Hyper Projection Engeki Haikyu!!: Winners and Losers	Yu Nishinoya	
2017	Stage: Touken Ranbu	Taikogane Sadamune	
2017	Digimon Adventure tri.: The Adventure on August 1st	Yamato Ishida	
2017	Ensemble Stars! Extra Stage: Judge of Knights	Leo Tsukinaga	
2017	King of Prism: Over the Sunshine	Shin Ichijo	
2017	Bungo Stray Dogs	Ryunosuke Akutagawa	
2018	Mobile Suit Gundam 00	Setsuna F. Seiei	
2018	Juni Taisen	Nagayuki Tsumita	
2018	Kageki Meiji Tokyo Renka: Gekkō no Meine Liebe	Shunso Hishida	
2018	Re:volver	Ito	
2019	The Royal Tutor: Musical II	Ivan Alexandruwitsch Romano	
2019	Bungo Stray Dogs: Sansha Teiritsu	Ryunosuke Akutagawa	
2019	Yu Yu Hakusho	Hiei	
2019	Gankutsuou: The Count of Monte Cristo	Albert de Morcef	
2022	Fruits Basket	Kyo Sohma	
2023	Tokyo Revengers	Hajime Kokonoi	
2025	Demon Slayer: Swordsmith Village Arc	Tanjiro Kamado*	

*It was announced on March 28, 2025, that Hashimoto would be playing the role of Tanjiro Kamado in the upcoming stage play after Shogo Sakamoto was diagnosed with mild cervical disc herniation. Hashimoto's original role of Zohakuten was taken over by Yojiro Itokawa.

=== Music video ===
Year	Artist	Song	Notes
2014	Greeeen	"Sakura Color"	

=== Television ===
Year	Title	Role	Network	Notes
2013–present	Shimajiro no Wao!	Himself	TV Tokyo	Intelligence training corner host
2016	A Girl & Three Sweethearts	Extra	Fuji TV	Episode 3: "I Like You"
2018	15-sai, Kyou kara Dōsei Hajimemasu	Hayato Kijō	Tokyo MX	
2018	Dikita Malimot: Ōsen no Wakasha-tachi	Eugene	TVK	Lead role
2019	Dimension High School	Yurio Mizukami	Tokyo MX, BS Fuji	Voice in anime; lead role
2020	Argonavis from BanG Dream!	Banri Shiroishi	MBS, TBS	Voice in anime; lead role

=== Film ===
Year	Title	Role	Notes
2014	L DK	Hamano	
2018	Koisuru Anti-Hero: The Movie	Hideki Arata	
2019	The Royal Tutor	Ivan Aleksandrovich Romano	Voice in anime film
2019	Itsumo Wasurenai yo	Eugene	
2022	Bungo Stray Dogs - BEAST	Akutagawa Ryuunosuke	
	Shikkokuten		
