= Dimension High School =

Japanese live-action and anime hybrid series

- Promotional visual

超次元革命アニメ Dimensionハイスクール (Chō Jigen Kakumei Anime: Dimension Hai Sukūru)
- Anime television series
- Directed by: Yuichi Abe
- Written by: Yuichi Abe
- Music by: Kenichiro Oishi
- Studio: Asmik Ace; Polygon Magic
- Licensed by: NA: Sentai Filmworks
- Original network: Tokyo MX, BS Fuji
- Original run: January 10, 2019 – March 28, 2019
- Episodes: 12

Dimension High School (Japanese: 超次元革命アニメ Dimensionハイスクール, Hepburn: Chō Jigen Kakumei Anime: Dimension Hai Sukūru; lit. "Superdimension Revolutional Anime: Dimension High School") is a Japanese live-action and anime hybrid series produced by Asmik Ace and Polygon Magic.

== Plot ==
Four high school students and their teacher are summoned into a different dimension by a living meteorite named Spudio the 22nd, where they are forced to solve riddles from the Sphinxes. The Sphinxes consume the souls of losing opponents, which allows them to ascend dimensions and end the world.

== Characters ==
Junpei Shiroyama (白山純平, Shiroyama Junpei)
Voiced by: Takahide Ishii
Junpei is a high school student and a member of the gardening club. He has a talent in solving puzzles, earning the nickname "Brain-blasting Genius."
Ryusei Midorigaoka (緑ヶ丘 流星, Midorigaoka Ryūsei)
Voiced by: Takeo Ōtsuka
Ryusei is Junpei's condescending childhood friend until he broke off their friendship in middle school. Ryusei also used to be part of the tennis team until a permanent wrist injury forced him to drop out. He is an honor student and admires Mr. Momoya greatly.
Yurio Mizukami (水上 ゆりお, Mizukami Yurio)
Voiced by: Shohei Hashimoto
Yurio is a gloomy, kind-hearted student who also works as an amateur model. He maintains a large following on social media.
Tsuyoshi Kikawada (黄川田 剛, Kikawada Tsuyoshi)
Voiced by: Takuma Zaiki
Tsuyoshi is a delinquent whose classmates fear him, and he was held back a year from a motorcycle accident. Since Yurio helped him, he regards him as his "angel."
Soshi Momoya (桃谷 総司, Momoya Sōshi)
Voiced by: Toshiyuki Someya
Mr. Momoya is the teacher in charge of tutoring class.
Dimensional Messenger (次元の使者, Jigen no Shisha)
Voiced by: Shouta Aoi
The series' narrator.
Spudio the 22nd (スプーディオ22世, Supūdio Nijūni-sei)
Voiced by: Takuya Eguchi
Spudio is a messenger from Oedipus who was sent to summon four heroes into the dimensional classroom to fight the Sphinxes in puzzle battles. He is from the second dimension, which had been destroyed by the Sphinxes.
Sphinx (スフィンクス)
Voiced by: Junichi Suwabe
The Sphinx family, composed of Paramesos, Dictis, Anticheiras, and Dactila, rule the dimensional classroom, engaging in puzzle battles. They consume their opponents' souls if they lose, which allows them to ascend dimensions.
Shiro Oide (大出 紫郎, Oide Shirō)
Played by: Shouta Aoi
Shiro is Mr. Momoya's high school friend who died in a car accident. He is revealed to be Oedipus reincarnated, and the one who led Spudio to their world.

== Media ==
=== Anime ===
The series aired from January 10 to March 28, 2019, on Tokyo MX and BS Fuji. The director of the live-action segments is Yuichi Abe, while Polygon Magic provided the animation, with the five members of the main cast providing the motion capture for their characters. The animated character designs were created by Izumi. To promote the show, a radio program titled Dimension High School: After School Private Study Room was broadcast beginning October 19, 2018, on Radio Osaka, Radio Cloud, and Niconico, with Takahide Ishii and Takeo Ōtsuka as hosts. The opening theme song is "Here we go!" by Takahide Ishii, Takeo Ōtsuka, Shohei Hashimoto, and Takuma Zaiki under the name 4 Dimensions. The single was released on February 13, 2019, by Nippon Columbia and charted at #59 on the Oricon Weekly Singles Chart in its first week. The ending theme song is "My Home" by Samurai Tunes. Sentai Filmworks licensed the show for English distribution.

Halfway throughout the series, Shouta Aoi, who provides the series' narration, began appearing in the live-action segments, which was his first acting role in a drama.

==== Episodes ====
No.	Title	Directed by	Written by	Original release date
1	"Brain-Blasting Genius"; Transliteration: "Hirameki no Tensai" (Japanese: ひらめきの天才)	Yuichi Abe	Yuichi Abe	January 10, 2019
Junpei finds a rock and brings it to his tutoring class, where it awakens as Spudio, a messenger from Oedipus. He summons the class to battle Sphinx Paramesos. Mr. Momoya is eaten when they run out of time for the first puzzle, but Junpei solves the second puzzle, remembering the class' earlier lesson about the Doppler effect. Mr. Momoya is rescued, but since he had been eaten once, he loses the thing most precious to him: money from farm trading.
2	"The Thing Most Precious to Me"; Transliteration: "Ichiban Taisetsu na Mono" (Japanese: 一番大切なもの)	Yuichi Abe	Yuichi Abe	January 17, 2019
Yurio is hiding a secret from Tsuyoshi, while Tsuyoshi confides in Junpei about how Yurio had saved him from a motorcycle accident a year ago. When Spudio summons the class to battle Paramesos, Yurio answers incorrectly and is eaten. However, Tsuyoshi helps the others solve the second puzzle, rescuing him. However, because Yurio had been eaten once, Tsuyoshi, who was the thing most precious to him, is wiped out of existence.
3	"Best Pals"; Transliteration: "Dachikō" (Japanese: ダチ公)	Yuichi Abe	Yuichi Abe	January 24, 2019
Determined to bring Tsuyoshi back, Yurio studies and prepares for battle with the Sphinx. When the remaining group solves both puzzles in a row, Paramesos is defeated and Tsuyoshi returns. Yurio confesses to Tsuyoshi that he had rigged his motorcycle, unintentionally causing his accident, in an attempt to befriend him, but Tsuyoshi forgives him and they become closer friends.
4	"Pride"; Transliteration: "Puraido" (Japanese: プライド)	Yuichi Abe	Yuichi Abe	January 31, 2019
While obtaining aromaticus for Ryusei, Junpei tells his friends that he and Ryusei used to be best friends, until Ryusei broke off their friendship when he decided to join the gardening club instead of the tennis team. While waiting for tutoring, Spudio transports Junpei, Ryusei, and Tsuyoshi to battle with Sphinx Dictis. When they run out of time for the first puzzle, Ryusei is eaten, but Junpei solves the second puzzle, causing him to return. However, Ryusei has lost his pride, the thing most precious to him.
5	"You're a Masochist"; Transliteration: "Omae wa M" (Japanese: お前はM)	Yuichi Abe	Yuichi Abe	February 7, 2019
Without pride, Ryusei has become embarrassingly laid-back, and when he tries to get the other students to join the tennis team, Junpei reveals that Ryusei had injured his wrist, forcing him to quit tennis permanently. When Dictis faces the four students, Junpei solves both questions in a row, defeating him and restoring Ryusei's arrogant personality. All four students and Mr. Momoya decide to destroy Spudio and grind him into dust.
6	"Tutoring for Tutoring"; Transliteration: "Hoshū no Hoshū" (Japanese: 補習の補習)	Yuichi Abe	Yuichi Abe	February 14, 2019
Junpei tries to patch up his friendship with Ryusei with Tsuyoshi's assistance, when they are summoned to battle Sphinx Green Hill, who gives them easy puzzles. Junpei is hailed as a genius while he befriends everyone, but he wakes up to realize it was all a dream.
7	"A Hole in the Heart"; Transliteration: "Kokoro no Ana" (Japanese: 心の穴)	Yuichi Abe	Yuichi Abe	February 21, 2019
Mr. Momoya reminisces his best friend, Shiro, and cryptically asks for advice from Junpei. During tutoring, Mr. Momoya brings out Spudio, who he had secretly rescued when they were destroying him, and asks him to bring them to the Sphinx. Ryusei defeats Sphinx Adihilas by answering both his questions correctly, but Mr. Momoya volunteers to be eaten and disappears.
8	"The Black Sphinx"; Transliteration: "Kuroi Sufinkusu" (Japanese: 黒いスフィンクス)	Yuichi Abe	Yuichi Abe	February 28, 2019
The students investigate Mr. Momoya's past and discover that Shiro had died in a car accident, suspecting that his death may be related to Mr. Momoya's sacrifice to the Sphinxes. Ryusei awakens Spudio to help them return Mr. Momoya, but they are unable to solve Sphinx Dactyla's puzzles, causing Junpei, Ryusei, and Tsuyoshi to be eaten in succession.
9	"Loss"; Transliteration: "Soshitsu" (Japanese: 喪失)	Yuichi Abe	Yuichi Abe	March 7, 2019
Yurio solves one of Dactyla's puzzles, returning everyone to the third dimension. However, Ryusei has lost his pride again, and Tsuyoshi has lost the metal plates in his body from his accident. Meanwhile, Junpei is not sure what he has lost.
10	"An Unbreakable Rule"; Transliteration: "Zettai no Rūru" (Japanese: 絶対のルール)	Yuichi Abe	Yuichi Abe	March 14, 2019
Ryusei invites everyone to a puzzle-solving game, to which they confirm that Junpei has lost his puzzle-solving abilities. When they are summoned to the dimensional classroom, the Sphinxes, using Mr. Momoya as an avatar, engage them a battle. Junpei wagers a challenge, offering all four of their lives if they lose the battle. However, if the Sphinxes are unable to solve a puzzle the students give them, they will leave the third dimension alone.
11	"Spudio"; Transliteration: "Supūdio" (Japanese: スプーディオ)	Yuichi Abe	Yuichi Abe	March 21, 2019
Spudio is revealed to be one of the previous four who had unsuccessfully battled the Sphinxes. The students solve both of the Sphinx's puzzles, while Mr. Momoya cannot solve the second puzzle in time. With the battle victorious, the students carry out their lives and reunite 10 years later. Junpei admits that he gave the Sphinxes an unsolvable puzzle, causing them to self-destruct when they attempt to escape upon learning the truth. Spudio uses the last of his energy to teleport Mr. Momoya away. Mr. Momoya meets with Shiro in the afterlife, who confesses he is Oedipus and returns him to the third dimension, where he is reunited with his students.
12	"Tutoring 10 Years Later"; Transliteration: "Jū-nen Ato no Hoshū" (Japanese: 10年後の補習)	Yuichi Abe	Yuichi Abe	March 28, 2019
The four students hear rumors that Spudio is inside their high school, which is now closed off and abandoned as well as due to be demolished. They reunite to explore at night, only to eventually find a real rock. Though Yurio admits he had set up all the scares for fun, Junpei suddenly hears Spudio warning him that there are more Sphinxes and that they are coming, but he dismisses it as his imagination. The following day, an unusual looking rock is seen at a playground filled with grade school students.

=== Manga ===
A manga adaptation illustrated by Ai Nimoda will run in Pixiv Sylph.

== Reception ==
Editors at Anime News Network gave Dimension High School low ratings upon its first episode, criticizing its bland storytelling and poor animation, while citing the live-action segments as the only entertaining parts of the show. Volume 1 of the DVD release peaked at #24 on the Oricon Weekly DVD Charts, selling 149 copies in its first week.
