= Plus-Sized Elf =

Japanese manga series

- First tankōbon volume cover, featuring Elfuda

エルフさんは痩せられない。 (Erufu-san wa Yaserarenai)
- Genre: Fantasy comedy
- Manga
- Written by: Synecdoche
- Published by: Wani Books (vol. 1–7); Akita Shoten (vol. 8)
- English publisher: NA: Seven Seas Entertainment
- Imprint: Gum Comics Plus (vol. 1–7); Young Champion Comics (vol. 8)
- Magazine: Comic Gum (December 21, 2016 – June 17, 2020); Self-published (April 30 – May 29, 2021)
- Original run: December 21, 2016 – May 29, 2021
- Volumes: 8
- Manga

Plus-Sized Elf: Second Helping!
- Written by: Synecdoche
- Published by: Akita Shoten
- English publisher: NA: Seven Seas Entertainment
- Imprint: Young Champion Comics
- Magazine: Dokodemo Young Champion
- Original run: October 26, 2021 – present
- Volumes: 6
- Anime television series
- Directed by: Toshikatsu Tokoro
- Written by: Yuki Takabayashi
- Music by: Cher Watanabe
- Studio: Elias
- Licensed by: Sentai Filmworks
- Original network: Tokyo MX, BS11 (censored); AT-X (uncensored)
- Original run: July 7, 2024 – September 22, 2024
- Episodes: 12 + 2 ONAs
- icon

Plus-Sized Elf (Japanese: エルフさんは痩せられない。, Hepburn: Erufu-san wa Yaserarenai; lit. 'Ms. Elf Can't Lose Weight') is a Japanese manga series written and illustrated by Synecdoche. It was originally serialized on Wani Books' Comic Gum website from December 2016 to June 2020, with its individual chapters collected into eight tankōbon volumes. After Wani Books' license to the series expired, Synecdoche self-published the series from April to May 2021, then started a continuation manga titled Plus-Sized Elf: Second Helping! (新・エルフさんは痩せられない。, Shin Erufu-san wa Yaserarenai; lit. 'Ms. Elf Can't Lose Weight New') in Akita Shoten's monthly seinen magazine, Dokodemo Young Champion, in October 2021, with its individual chapters collected into six tankōbon volumes. Both manga are licensed for English release in North America by Seven Seas Entertainment. An anime television series adaptation produced by Elias aired from July to September 2024.

== Plot ==
One night, Tomoatsu Naoe, an osteopathic massage therapist, meets a new client. She is Elfuda, an elf from another world who gained an excessive amount of weight during her stay on Earth by eating French fries, who needs his help shedding pounds so she can be able to return through the portal that leads her home. As Tomoatsu assists with Elfuda's weight loss, many other overweight mythical creatures come seeking his help.

== Characters ==
Tomoatsu Naoe (直江 友厚, Naoe Tomoatsu)
Voiced by: Takahide Ishii (Japanese); Kieran Axel (English)
A seitai massage practitioner who works at Smiley Boar, a relaxation clinic. He is in charge of setting treatments and meal plans for his clients, who simply refer to him as "Human". He has a serious problem with reptiles ever since he got bitten by a snake when he was a kid. Despite his job of slimming down people seriously, he clearly had a secret fetish for chubby women and fantasied his manager's got plumper, even dreams of a harem his mythical clients in a strange way at night-time, But he's too coy to act on it.
Akiho Ino (猪野 明穂, Ino Akiho)
Voiced by: Aya Uchida (Japanese); Allison Sumrall (English)
The 40-year-old lustful manager of Smiley Boar who looks younger than her age suggests. She is unaware that Tomoatsu's clients are not humans. She likes to regularly go out for drinks, much to Tomoatsu's chagrin. She also has implied feelings for him, although on the beach island it is clear she desires a harem of men.
Elfuda (絵留札, Erufuda)
Voiced by: Ayasa Itō (Japanese); Shelby Blocker (English)
An otherworldly elf who became fat from eating too many French fries on Earth and is seeking help losing weight in order to use the portal which leads back to her home. Although she accomplishes her goal at first, her weight keeps fluctuating with each visit between worlds due to her fondness for fries. She decides to live with Tomoatsu while following his weight loss regimen. In her universe, she is a skilled archer. Most of the creatures she meets from her world do not get along with her, due to the fact that she is often rude to them. Elfuda is also aware is Tomoatsu a chubby chaser.
Kuroeda (黒枝)
Voiced by: Rena Hasegawa (Japanese); Elissa Cuellar (English)
A dark elf who works at a convenience store. She is troubled by her large buttocks caused by long hours of standing and no exercise. Because elves and dark elves are natural enemies in her universe, she does not get along with Elfuda. However, in time, they grow to be frenemies. She is a sorceress who likes to collect materials to brew potions. Like Elfuda, Kuroeda is too aware that Tomoatsu is a chubby chaser.
Mero (米路)
Voiced by: Sora Tokui (Japanese); Karlii Hoch (English)
A merrow who works at a fish market. She can maintain a human form by drinking a special kind of medicine. She suffers from sagging arms due to a lack of swimming because of her busy work schedule. She speaks in Kansai-ben despite never visiting the region.
Kusahanada (草花田)
Voiced by: Miyu Kubota (Japanese); Kelly Martin (English)
An alraune who owns a flower shop. She has a flower on top of her head and is troubled by its rapid growth from an overexposure to sunny weather. Her hobbies are gardening and sunbathing. She transforms into different personalities when she drinks other liquids than water. She can turn into a man-eating gyaru, an intoxicated woman, an incredibly lean and muscular energetic coach, or any other person with all kinds of plants: a Venus flytrap by drinking coffee, pitcher plant by drinking alcohol and a shrub by drinking sports drinks. When she drinks Mero's transformation supplement, she gender-swaps from female to male. During the series, She seems to have feelings for Naoe due to his kindness, As she flirts a bit with him and one time even said she wanted a turn sleeping on his crotch.
Oga (男鹿)
Voiced by: Ayaka Fukuhara (Japanese); Olivia Swasey (English)
An ogre who gained a beer belly from excessive drinking on Earth because of a fondness for alcohol and formed good terms with Akiho as drinking buddies. She is a fierce warrior who is tall and muscular, who fights with brute force and superhuman strength. She tends to display strong motherly instincts around children or child-like creatures. Oga also forms on and off rivalry with Hitome due to similar sizes, bodybuilds and maternal instincts.
Laika (頼加, Raika)
Voiced by: Madoka Asahina (Japanese); Jad Saxton (English)
A lycanthrope who can switch between human form and animal form. She gained weight from the amount of food that humans fed her, thinking she was a pet dog due to her appearance, though she constantly insists she is not. She is innocent and friendly and tends to speak in the third person.
Oku (奥)
Voiced by: Aya Uchida (Japanese); Josslyn Johnson (English)
A pig-like orc who used to be overweight, as orcs naturally are in her world. She came to Earth to achieve a slim figure by herself, which she accomplished through a strict diet with swimming exercises. However, when a local gym's pool was closed for renovations, she became overweight again. She resembles Tomoatsu's boss, Akiho, without glasses.
Kobo (児穂)
Voiced by: Kotori Koiwai (Japanese); Brittney Karbowski (English)
A bratty kobold who gained flabby cheeks by eating too many sweets obtained from children at a playground. Although she has the appearance of a child, she is a full-grown adult. She likes shiny things and playing pranks on other people. She exhibits the speech sound disorder known as rhotacism, replacing her R and L with W.
Satero (佐手呂)
Voiced by: Yuka Iguchi (Japanese); Molly Searcy (English)
A satyr who feeds on human desires. She also eats regular food, which has made her fat due to the high quality and excessive eating, particularly of Japanese cuisine. Her hobby is cooking, which she uses to lure her prey. She is the only mythical creature not in Tomoatsu's group of clients, yet on rare occasions she does join them at the beach for cooking barbecues. As such, she acts as the de facto antagonist of the series. On Earth, she will take a human form while out in public, mostly to scheme against Tomoatsu and his clients. However, she becomes easily embarrassed in lewd situations, especially in front of Tomoatsu, and her vengeful tricks backfires at her and sometimes she gets the wrong impressions with Tomoatsu's daily time with his clients mistaking them for an erotic harem doing sexual activities.
Honeda (骨田)
Voiced by: Kaori Maeda (Japanese); Juliet Simmons (English)
A skeleton who was originally a fairy before her death. In her past life, she was a mage who was tried for treason and hung for her crimes she didn't even commit. She uses magic to reconstruct her body to what it looked like when she was still alive, although her pseudo-body has become fat as well.
Gonda (含蛇)
Voiced by: Aino Shimada (Japanese); Katelyn Barr (English)
A lazy dragon who communicates telepathically. Her favorite food is meat and she gained weight by eating too much of it. Her strong instincts have caused her to fail at all attempts to lose weight on her own. Like Kobo, she also has an affinity for shiny things.
Hitome (一目)
Voiced by: Mikoi Sasaki (Japanese); Christie Guidry (English)
A cyclops who is also tall and muscular. She has been boxing to lose weight, but due to her huge body, she has not been able to find a suitable sparring partner. She is bigger and taller than she normally appears and reverts to her original size if something, like a thunderstorm, scares her enough. She becomes sparring rivals with Oga due to their similar heights and builds, then maternal rivals when Kobo is involved.
Oeda (大江田, Ōeda)
Voiced by: Shizuka Ishigami (Japanese); Shelley Calene-Black (English)
Elfuda's aunt. She is a weapons tutor who is known as one of the best warriors in her family. Her body is covered in scars from past battles. She came to Earth to bring Elfuda home, but also became fat and unable to return to her universe due to an addiction to soft serve ice cream.

== Media ==
=== Manga ===
Plus-Sized Elf is written and illustrated by Synecdoche. The manga was published digitally by Wani Books on their Comic Gum website from December 21, 2016, until June 17, 2020, at the manga's 45th chapter, before Synecdoche announced that Wani Books' license with the series had ended and that the manga would enter on hiatus in order to find a new publisher; Synecdoche took over posting the 46th and 47th chapters on Twitter, released on April 30 and May 29, 2021, respectively. On September 1, 2021, after revealing that Akita Shoten would be taking over as the series' publisher, Synecdoche ended the first manga and started a sequel, Plus-Sized Elf: Second Helping!, which continues the story. Plus-Sized Elf's chapters have been collected into individual tankōbon volumes across both series. Eight volumes of the original manga were published from June 26, 2017, to November 18, 2021, with Wani Books publishing volumes 1–7 and Akita Shoten publishing the eighth. The first seven volumes were reprinted by Akita Shoten from June 20, 2022, to February 20, 2023. As of May 2026, 6 volumes of the continuation has been published.

Seven Seas Entertainment acquired Plus-Sized Elf for English publication in North America on November 17, 2017. On March 8, 2023, they acquired its sequel.

==== Volumes ====
===== Plus-Sized Elf =====
No.	Original release date	Original ISBN	English release date	English ISBN
1	June 26, 2017 (original); June 20, 2022 (reprint)	978-4-8470-6801-0 (original); 978-4-2533-0612-6 (reprint)	October 23, 2018 (original); August 1, 2023 (reprint)	978-1-6269-2906-7 (original); 978-1-6857-9798-0 (reprint)
2	January 25, 2018 (original); July 20, 2022 (reprint)	978-4-8470-6811-9 (original); 978-4-2533-0613-3 (reprint)	April 30, 2019 (original); September 5, 2023 (reprint)	978-1-6269-2970-8 (original); 978-1-6857-9799-7 (reprint)
3	July 25, 2018 (original); August 19, 2022 (reprint)	978-4-8470-6823-2 (original); 978-4-2533-0614-0 (reprint)	October 8, 2019 (original); October 24, 2023 (reprint)	978-1-6427-5029-4 (original); 979-8-8884-3030-9 (reprint)
4	February 25, 2019 (original); September 20, 2022 (reprint)	978-4-8470-6836-2 (original); 978-4-2533-0615-7 (reprint)	December 10, 2019 (original); January 9, 2024 (reprint)	978-1-6427-5735-4 (original); 979-8-8884-3103-0 (reprint)
5	August 24, 2019 (original); October 20, 2022 (reprint)	978-4-8470-6848-5 (original); 978-4-2533-0616-4 (reprint)	August 18, 2020 (original); March 19, 2024 (reprint)	978-1-6450-5483-2 (original); 979-8-8884-3377-5 (reprint)
6	March 25, 2020 (original); January 20, 2023 (reprint)	978-4-8470-6853-9 (original); 978-4-2533-0617-1 (reprint)	December 8, 2020 (original); June 18, 2024 (reprint)	978-1-6450-5812-0 (original); 979-8-8884-3597-7 (reprint)
7	October 24, 2020 (original); February 20, 2023 (reprint)	978-4-8470-6857-7 (original); 978-4-2533-0618-8 (reprint)	September 14, 2021 (original); October 1, 2024 (reprint)	978-1-6482-7358-2 (original); 979-8-8884-3598-4 (reprint)
8	November 18, 2021	978-4-2533-0611-9	December 20, 2022	978-1-6385-8562-6

===== Plus-Sized Elf: Second Helping! =====
No.	Original release date	Original ISBN	English release date	English ISBN
1	June 20, 2022	978-4-2533-0716-1	September 26, 2023	978-1-6857-9523-8
2	February 20, 2023	978-4-2533-0717-8	February 20, 2024	979-8-8884-3080-4
3	January 18, 2024	978-4-2533-0718-5	October 29, 2024	979-8-8916-0486-5
4	August 20, 2024	978-4-2533-0719-2	February 25, 2025	979-8-89160-500-8
5	August 20, 2025	978-4-2533-0720-8	April 7, 2026	979-8-89561-706-9
6	May 27, 2026	978-4-253-01317-8	—	—

=== Anime ===
An anime television series adaptation was announced on January 15, 2024. It was produced by Elias and directed by Toshikatsu Tokoro, with scripts written by Yuki Takabayashi, characters designed by Katsuyuki Sato, and music composed by Cher Watanabe. A censored version of the series aired from July 7 to September 22, 2024, on Tokyo MX and BS11, while an uncensored version aired on AT-X from July 8 to September 23, 2024. (Note: Tokyo MX and BS11 listed the series premiere on July 6, 2024, at 25:30, which is effectively July 7 at 12:30 a.m. JST.) The opening theme song is "Fried☆Pride" (フライド☆プライド, Furaido☆Puraido) performed by Real Akiba Boyz, while the ending theme song is "Minna de Diet" (みんなDEダイエット, Min'na de Daietto; lit. 'Let's Diet Together!') performed by the cast of the series. Sentai Filmworks licensed the series in North America, Australia and British Isles for streaming on Hidive, simulcasting the uncensored version.

==== Episodes ====
No.	Title	Directed by (Note: Production staff information is taken from the ending credits of each episode.)	Written by	Storyboarded by	Original release date
1	"The Elf of the Forest"; Transliteration: "Mori no Yōsei" (Japanese: 森の妖精)	Unknown (Note: No credit was given.)	Unknown	Unknown	July 7, 2024
Tomoatsu Naoe, an employee at the Smiley Boar relaxation clinic, is charged with taking care of the last customer of the day, an extremely obese woman by the name of Elfuda who wants to slim down. As he gives her a massage, her cap slips off, revealing a set of long pointed ears identifying her as an elf. Elfuda has come through a portal from another world to partake in Earth's French fries, which she has come to enjoy over her own world's bland diet, but is now unfortunately stuck on Earth because she must have the same weight she had at her arrival to be able to use the portal again. Forced to cooperate, Tomoatsu subjects Elfuda to a strictly regulated dietary and exercise regimen. One month later, Elfuda is back to her former slender self. She returns home, but soon afterward Tomoatsu encounters her again in a fast food restaurant, once more with an obese figure from overeating on fries and overconfident about Earth's weight-loss treatments. At a nearby convenience store, a female employee is revealed as a dark elf.
2	"The Dark Elf and the Beautiful Flower"; Transliteration: "Yami no Yōsei to Uruwashi no Hana" (Japanese: 闇の妖精と麗しの花)	Toshikatsu Tokoro	Yuki Takabayashi	Toshikatsu Tokoro	July 14, 2024
Late at night, Tomoatsu and Elfuda happen to run into each other at a convenience store, where they are both buying snacks. Here, they meet Kuroeda, the store's cashier and only employee. With Elfuda being an elf and Kuroeda being a dark elf, the two women are immediately at odds, as their races are sworn enemies in their world. Having learned about Elfuda's prior results with Tomoatsu's weight loss regimen, Kuroeda requests his assistance to help slim down her big butt in order for her to properly wear her special garment that allows her to use magic. The next day, Tomoatsu meets Kusahanada, an Alraune who runs a flower shop and suffers from shoulder pain due to a large flower growing on her head in the continuous sunny weather. Noticing her poor posture, he gives her a corrective back brace, plus an umbrella to shade her flower in the sunlight to keep it from growing out of control. As a token of her thanks, Kusahanada gives Tomoatsu two evening spa coupons, but tells him to beware of an ogre that appears at the sauna at night.
3	"The Sweaty Ogre and the Turquoise Scales"; Transliteration: "Neppa no Oni to Midori no Uroko" (Japanese: 熱波の鬼と緑の鱗)	Toshikatsu Tokoro	Yuki Takabayashi	Toshikatsu Tokoro	July 21, 2024
To avoid the ogre he was warned about, Tomoatsu gives the evening spa coupons he received to Elfuda so that the sweat from the sauna will boost her metabolism and aid in her weight loss. At the bathhouse, she meets up with Kuroeda, and the two are arguing with each other once again. Together, they both end up using the spa's sauna, where they meet Oga, the aforementioned ogre. Oga explains to them how much ogres like herself love alcohol, and how drinking too much of it while visiting Earth gave her a beer belly. After her sauna visit, Elfuda, along with Tomoatsu, runs into Mero, a mermaid fishmonger who can take the form of a human through a maca extract potion. As she wishes to abstain from being seen in her true form while on Earth, she developed flabby arms as she was unable to regulate her weight by swimming, this task being too hard for her to do in human form. After Tomoatsu suggests doing bicep curls and wall pushups to manage the weight in her arms, Mero gives him a container full of salmon roe as a token of her appreciation. As Tomoatsu runs to get Elfuda more French fries, a grey dog is seen walking up to a nearby store.
4	"The Baron's Dog and the Floating Pig"; Transliteration: "Danshaku no Inu to Fuyō no Buta" (Japanese: 男爵の犬と浮揚の豚)	Yusuke Onoda	Yuki Takabayashi	Yusuke Onoda	July 28, 2024
Tomoatsu and Elfuda are going for a jog in the park that happens to also be where the portal between Earth and the other world lies. As Elfuda prepares to eat more French fries, a dog walks up to them, wanting her fry. Tomoatsu becomes overly affectionate while petting her, and she turns into a human; the dog in question, Laika, is actually a lycanthrope with the ability to change between human and werewolf forms. Laika is seeking to lose weight due to consuming an excess amount of treats that were offered to her. Later, at a local gym, Tomoatsu, along with all his other clients, are all swimming at the gym's pool, getting more exercise in. He meets Oku, an orc that closely resembles his boss, Akiho, albeit in pig-like humanoid form. Since orcs are never known to be in shape in her world, Oku came to Earth to learn about dieting and discovered that aquatic exercise works best for losing weight for someone of her size. Afterwards, at Smiley Boar, Oku approaches Tomoatsu, now having gained her weight back due to the gym's pool being closed for renovations, in need of his help to learn about other methods of exercise.
5	"The Empress of the Park and the Demonic Dinner"; Transliteration: "Kōen no Nyotei to Yoru no Mashoku" (Japanese: 公園の女帝と夜の魔食)	Ryu Yajima	Yuki Takabayashi	Ryu Yajima	August 4, 2024
Tomoatsu, Elfuda, Kuroeda, and Oga are at a park where Oga engages positively with the children. She soon becomes infatuated with Kobo, an ill-tempered kobold who has claimed the playground as her territory and demands candy from the group to allow them to continue using it. Kobo justifies her actions by stating that she was abandoned by her parents and is simply trying to survive. However, Elfuda observes that her physique suggests otherwise, noting that someone truly starving would not have such excess weight. When she finds herself stuck in a playground tire after struggling to dodge Elfuda's arrows, Tomoatsu recommends that Kobo engage in facial exercises and adopt a healthier diet. In return for these suggestions, Kobo agrees to honor her promise to Tomoatsu not to misbehave any further. Later, at Smiley Boar, Elfuda notices Tomoatsu's own weight gain, prompting Tomoatsu to embark on a weight loss regimen, which proves ineffective. He eventually discovers that the source of his weight gain was a satyr named Satero, who had hypnotized him into overeating in order to feed off his avarice. Kuroeda and Elfuda step in to assist him, with Elfuda using her arrows to forcibly remove Satero's clothing, causing her to flee in embarrassment. Recognizing that satyrs have a strong bond with their prey, Elfuda suggests that all the mythical beings under Tomoatsu's care reside with him for his protection, while Satero observes from a distance near his apartment.
6	"The Hindsight Bones and the Snowy Dragon"; Transliteration: "Tsuioku no Hone to Rokka no Ryū" (Japanese: 追憶の骨と六花の竜)	Unknown	Unknown	Unknown	August 11, 2024
On a snowy day, within Tomoatsu's apartment, Laika is chewing on a bone. As she ventures beneath Tomoatsu's bed, she accidentally retrieves a skull, which leads Tomoatsu, Elfuda, and Oku to discover an entire skeleton—an accumulation of bones that Laika gathered over time. The skeleton reanimates and introduces herself as Honeda, a former mage who was hung for treason and has been reincarnated as a skeleton that wandered to Earth. Utilizing magic, she reconstructs her appearance, resulting in a flabby physique. After receiving help from Tomoatsu to lose weight, she finally finds peace, only for her to return to life once more and remain on Earth. Later, as Elfuda and Kuroeda are jogging, Tomoatsu rushes to work; Elfuda then stumbles upon a body concealed beneath the snow. After transporting it back to Tomoatsu's apartment, they discover it to be Gonda, a dragon who had been out for a walk to shed some weight but succumbed to drowsiness in the snow. Kuroeda proposes assisting Gonda in her weight loss efforts in order to obtain her dragon treasure. While engaging in arm swimming exercises with Tomoatsu, Gonda’s tail unexpectedly emerges from her shirt, as Elfuda and Kuroeda had been concealing her identity as a dragon, which causes Tomoatsu to stand frozen in shock due to his fear of reptiles. In return for adhering to her exercise regimen, she offers Elfuda and Kuroeda her treasure, which turns out to be decorative beads intended for a toilet sink basin.
7	"Potatoes of Shame and the Titan's Fist"; Transliteration: "Chijoku no Imo to Taitan no Kyoken" (Japanese: 恥辱の芋とタイタンの巨拳)	Toshikatsu Tokoro	Yuki Takabayashi	Shigenori Awai	August 18, 2024
To celebrate her weight loss, Elfuda treats herself to French fries, only for her to be the burger restaurant's 10,000th customer, winning a year's supply of French fries as a prize. Much to Oga and Kuroeda's surprise, both Elfuda and Tomoatsu have gained an enormous amount of weight. Kuroeda detects a magical spell on the fries, leading the group to suspect that Satero is responsible for the weight gain, who later appears at Tomoatsu's apartment. Vowing revenge being embarrassed when she was stripped naked in front of Tomoatsu, she targeted Elfuda due to her fondness for French fries, resulting in her clothing tearing off from her flabby stature. However, Elfuda is unfazed, as she feels no shame thanks to Tomoatsu's daily massages. After Elfuda congratulates Tomoatsu on Satero's defeat, his clothes also tear, prompting Satero to flee in embarrassment once again. Later, Tomoatsu, Elfuda, Oga, Oku, and Mero visit Akiho's boxing gym for some light sparring. While Elfuda, Oku, and Mero understand the intent, Oga takes it too far, albeit as a joke. A large cyclops woman named Hitome arrives at the gym to spar with the group; she is paired with Oga, as they share similar builds. However, instead of engaging in light sparring, the two women end up in a full-scale fight.
8	"Otherworldly Beings and Super Spicy Poses"; Transliteration: "Isekai Hito to Netsumori no Pōzu" (Japanese: 異世界人と熱盛りのポーズ)	Yusuke Onoda	Yuki Takabayashi	Yusuke Onoda	August 25, 2024
As Tomoatsu's boss, Akiho, shows off her new yoga outfit to him, she hands him a flyer for a newly opened yoga studio, "Hot Yoga", which is owned by a friend of hers, as Tomoatsu is concerned about the lack of weight loss from all of his clients. Because of the studio's name, the women mistakenly strip down naked, believing it to be a sauna. After they get dressed, Tomoatsu guides them through a series of yoga poses. Meanwhile, Satero observes from outside but yet again flees in embarrassment at the suggestive nature of the poses. As the session continues on, tensions rise with Elfuda and Kuroeda arguing, while Oga and Hitome engage in another fight to settle their previous sparring match; despite the commotion, Honeda remains focused and continues her yoga practice. Later, when Gonda enters the studio to explore yoga, Tomoatsu's fear of reptiles causes him to faint once more.
9	"Kiddie Cure-all"; Transliteration: "Shota no Myōyaku" (Japanese: ショタの妙藥)	Toshikatsu Tokoro	Yuki Takabayashi	Toshikatsu Tokoro	September 1, 2024
Kuroeda concocts a magical potion disguised as a soda bottle and leaves it in Tomoatsu's apartment, intended for Elfuda. However, when Tomoatsu takes a sip of it, his clients discover that his body has shrunk to the size of a child. Elfuda suspects Satero may be involved, while Kuroeda, attempting to evade detection, tries to dispose of the evidence while figuring out how to revert Tomoatsu to his adult size. When Oga arrives, her maternal instincts come into play, unaware that it is simply a shrunken Tomoatsu. Tomoatsu promised Oga to do a cooking lesson with her, which and Kuroeda join in on, as Kuroeda continues to search for a solution to her potion dilemma. After making a stew while performing back leg lifts, Kuroeda feels thirsty, prompting Elfuda to offer her the rest of the bottle of the magical potion. Not wanting to give herself away, Kuroeda accidentally squirts the potion into Elfuda's eyes. Tomoatsu later discovers that Kuroeda created a defective weight loss potion, which she made to make Tomoatsu's job easier. Eventually, Tomoatsu returns to adult size, but in an overgrown state.
10	"The Affectionate Dog and the Dark Roast Plant"; Transliteration: "Jōai no Inu to Fukairi no Kusa" (Japanese: 情愛の犬と深煎りの草)	Ryu Yajima	Yuki Takabayashi	Yoshihide Kuriyama	September 8, 2024
Elfuda orders fries from a fast food restaurant, which Laika steals from her and runs away. She chases Laika all the way to a box containing a puppy that Laika has been caring for. In a moment of kindness, Elfuda decides to share her fries with the hungry puppy, but the puppy declines as the fries are heavily salted. Later, Elfuda visits a café to sample German coffee, mistakenly believing it contains potatoes, only to find she dislikes it. She then meets up with Tomoatsu as he takes his wilted rose bush to Kusahanada's flower shop for her to work her alraune magic and revive the plant. Afterwards, Tomoatsu generously treats the group to some coffee. However, when Kusahanada takes a sip, the flower on her head transforms into a Venus flytrap, and her skin darkens, making her sound like and resemble a gyaru. To help her regain control, Kuroeda, Oku, Elfuda, and Mero engage in a battle with her, but they all end up incapacitated. Tomoatsu becomes ensnared in Kusahanada's vines and is fed to her flytrap. When Elfuda regains consciousness, she discovers Tomoatsu naked and crying beside a sleeping Kusahanada. Back at the entrance gate between worlds, a woman dressed in clothing resembling that of Elfuda's in her home realm steps out from the doors.
11	"A Stagnating Dream"; Transliteration: "Yasenu Yume" (Japanese: 痩せぬ夢)	Toshikatsu Tokoro	Yuki Takabayashi	Ryu Yajima	September 15, 2024
On a sunny day, Tomoatsu encourages Elfuda to spend the day with him outside; all the while, a mysterious masked woman is seen watching over them, licking a soft-serve ice cream cone. At Smiley Boar, Tomoatsu's clients arrive for their scheduled massages despite a heavy thunderstorm outside. Hitome's fear of thunder causes her to lose control of her size-shifting ability, reverting to her original giant form while hugging Tomoatsu for comfort. After giving Laika her massage, Tomoatsu encounters the mysterious woman on his way home. While they talk in private, Elfuda arrives with her crossbow in hand, demanding that the woman remove her mask. To her surprise, she reveals herself as Oeda, Elfuda's aunt and combat mentor, who has come to Earth to bring her back to their universe. Disgusted at the amount of weight Elfuda has gained, Oeda decides to stay with her in Tomoatsu's apartment in order for Elfuda to lose weight the way Oeda desires. She subjects Elfuda to a harsh weight loss regimen with a meager breakfast, seemingly to Tomoatsu's dissatisfaction.
12	"The Beefy Soldier and Remnants of a Dream"; Transliteration: "Kinkotsu no Hei to Yume no Ato" (Japanese: 筋骨の兵と夢の跡)	Toshikatsu Tokoro	Yuki Takabayashi	Toshikatsu Tokoro	September 22, 2024
Oeda makes Elfuda undertake additional physically demanding activities such as push-ups, sauna sessions, and log squats. When Elfuda sneaks off to try to eat more French fries, she is instructed to eat a single piece of broccoli for dinner instead. The next day, Tomoatsu gives a tired Elfuda a bottle of water before Oeda makes her do sword practice. Eventually, Elfuda collapses from exhaustion, prompting Tomoatsu to intervene and confront Oeda, asserting that Elfuda is his patient and he bears responsibility for her weight loss, as he believes Oeda's current regimen is far too excessive. After an unsuccessful attempt to deter Tomoatsu by swinging her sword at him, Elfuda returns to Tomoatsu's side to advocate for her own weight loss goals while continuing to work with him. Moved by her determination, Oeda relinquishes her control and leaves Elfuda in Tomoatsu's care, attempting to return to her own to her world through the park's portal, however, she cannot return due to consuming too much soft-serve ice cream. Subsequently, Kuroeda joins the group, and Elfuda proudly displays her newly attained slim figure. She then receives a coupon for French fries from Kuroeda, which prompts her to order a mega-size portion. At the playground, Kobo tries to sell a turquoise gem to Hitome, only for Oga to reappear and continue their battle. Back at Tomoatsu's apartment, Gonda requests warmth from Kuroeda, who declines, leading Gonda to use her sonic voice to blow off Kuroeda and Oeda's clothing; she ultimately uses Tomoatsu's shower to warm up. The ensuing fight between Hitome and Oeda also results in torn clothing; a similar fate befalls Kobo when she attempts to intervene. They all arrive at Tomoatsu's apartment nude, which surprises Elfuda, who, having indulged in the mega-size fries, has regained all her weight. She once again seeks Tomoatsu's assistance to achieve her weight loss goals.
13 (ONA)	"Muffin Top Island"; Transliteration: "Hami Niku no Shima" (Japanese: ハミ肉の島)	Toshikatsu Tokoro	Yuki Takabayashi	Toshikatsu Tokoro	October 6, 2024
Akiho invites Tomoatsu and his clients to a secluded island for a day at the beach. This even includes Satero, in her fast food restaurant employee form, who was brought along after she was captured in Tomoatsu's aparement. Kuroeda attempts to put on an inner tube, but she cannot pull it up past her large buttocks. Oga is making sandcastles with Kobo, when Kusahanada and Hitome arrive, encroaching on her territory as a mother. On top of a nearby cliff, Mero jumps into the water but drowns. Honeda jumps in to rescue her but faces the same fate. Tomoatsu is teaching Oeda, Kuroeda, and Elfuda how to use a stand-up paddle board, when all their boards are tipped over. Laika is following a crab in the sand, when a squid's tentacle pops out of the ground. She grabs it and is pulled head-first into the sand with Mero and Honeda pulled in as well. The tentacles then pull in Gonda, who had been floating on an inner tube on the water. Oga and Hitome have a sumo match to settle their rivalry until Tomoatsu calls them in for a barbecue, leading to a temporary truce. At the barbecue table, a wide selection of seafood is available, as Tomoatsu searches for someone to prepare the squid. Satero volunteers to help, but her swimsuit tears, causing her to embarrassingly revert to her satyr form. A kraken emerges, capturing Oku, Mero, and Honeda in its tentacles. Elfuda, Oeda, Oga, Hitome, Laika, and Kuroeda join forces to combat it, but their efforts prove ineffective against the creature's size. Gonda, realizing the kraken was out to ruin everyone's beach experience, angrily attacks it with flaming dragon breath, inadvertently burning everyone's swimsuits off in the process. Laika, Kobo, and Kusahanada watch the kraken retreat into the sunset while Elfuda attends to Tomoatsu, who is frozen in shock from witnessing Gonda's attack. Akiho, having fallen asleep earlier, dreams of Tomoatsu, as her swimsuit top tears off.
14 (ONA)	"Calorie Lovers"; Transliteration: "Karorī Ravāzu" (Japanese: カロリーラヴァーズ)	Toshikatsu Tokoro	Yuki Takabayashi	Toshikatsu Tokoro	October 20, 2024
In an alternate high school romantic comedy setting, Tomoatsu is walking to school with Elfuda and Kuroeda, who is looking after him while his mother is away. Mero arrives and flips the girls' skirts. Kusahanada, Oku, and Honeda join the group shortly after. Laika, Satero, and Hitome, who is carrying Gonda, run in, only to trip and fall over Tomoatsu, exposing their panties. All the girls eventually argue over who gets to spend the night at Tomoatsu's house before running off to school together upon realizing they are running late. In the classroom, their teacher, Oeda, enters and immediately seduces Tomoatsu in front of the girls. Afterwards, Tomoatsu accidentally bumps into Kusahanada, who was carrying a bucket of water, spilling it all over her and revealing her breasts underneath her uniform, to which Tomoatsu offers his jacket to cover her up. Jealous, Mero, Laika, Hitome, and Oku also spill water on themselves in hopes of sharing Tomoatsu's jacket. Later, behind the school, Tomoatsu finds Kuroeda feeding beef jerky to a dog. She offers him a piece of jerky, before being found by Elfuda. Back in the classroom, Tomoatsu openly questions why the girls are acting flirtatious toward him, prompting the girls to confess their feelings, with Elfuda reminding him that he promised to marry one of them in the future when they were children. Suddenly, Oga, Tomoatsu's mother, crashes in through the window, warning everyone that a new diet supplement has turned the rest of the world into zombies, shifting the romcom into a zombie survival setting called "Calories of the Dead". Everything has been the result of a nightmare that Tomoatsu is experiencing, with Satero lingering nearby. Kuroeda spots her, leading to a confrontation. Satero enlarges Kuroeda's buttocks while Kuroeda forces Satero to imagine a romantically nude Tomoatsu, leading to a mana explosion. Elfuda awakens to find Kuroeda and Satero both naked and knocked out, next to a sleeping Tomoatsu.
