= Isshiki-san Wants to Know About Love =

Japanese manga series

- First tankōbon volume cover, featuring Rinna Miliford Isshiki

一式さんは恋を知りたい。 (Isshiki-san wa Koi o Shiritai)
- Genre: Romantic comedy
- Manga

Rinna Keibu wa Kokyū ga Dekinai
- Written by: Ayune Araragi
- Published by: Ichijinsha
- Imprint: Rex Comics
- Magazine: Monthly Comic Rex
- Original run: October 27, 2016 – December 27, 2017
- Volumes: 3
- Manga
- Written by: Ayune Araragi
- Published by: Kadokawa Shoten
- English publisher: NA: Yen Press
- Imprint: Kadokawa Comics A
- Magazine: Monthly Shōnen Ace
- Original run: June 26, 2020 – present
- Volumes: 10
- Anime television series
- Directed by: Kazuya Komai
- Written by: Deko Akao
- Music by: Michiru
- Studio: Sakura Create
- Original run: January 2027 – scheduled
- icon

Isshiki-san Wants to Know About Love (一式さんは恋を知りたい。, Isshiki-san wa Koi o Shiritai) is a Japanese manga series written and illustrated by Ayune Araragi. It was originally serialized under the title Rinna Keibu wa Kokyū ga Dekinai (リンナ警部は呼吸ができない) in Ichijinsha's Monthly Comic Rex magazine between October 2016 and December 2017, with its chapters being collected into three volumes. It was then relaunched in Kadokawa Shoten's Monthly Shōnen Ace magazine in June 2020, with its chapters collected into ten volumes as of May 2026. An anime television series adaptation produced by Sakura Create is set to premiere in January 2027.

== Plot ==
The series follows Rinna Miliford Isshiki, a genius police inspector who is nicknamed "Steel-Faced Rinna". Known for her serious demeanor, recently she had seen herself feeling flustered when she is around police detective Meishi Rokutanda. Although she aims to continue showing her steel-faced facade, she cannot help but fall for Meishi's kindness. Wanting to get over her conflicted feelings, she decides to accept Meishi's offer of them becoming engaged in a fake relationship, thought it is unknown if Meishi feels the same way for her.

== Characters ==
Rinna Miliford Isshiki (一式 リンナ ミルフォード, Isshiki Rinna Mirifōdo)
Voiced by: Riko Akechi
A police inspector known for her serious demeanor and high intelligence. She became a police inspector at the age of 17 thanks to her brilliance, having graduated at the top of the class. She is nicknamed Steel-Faced Rinna (鋼鉄のリンナ, Kōtetsu no Rinna) for her personality. She does not want to show her feelings to others, but finds difficulty in doing so after developing feelings for Meishi.
In Rinna Keibu wa Kokyū ga Dekinai, her name is Rinna Miliford (リンナ・ミルフォード, Rinna Mirifōdo), a police inspector working for the London police force.
Meishi Rokutanda (六反田 メイシ, Rokutanda Meishi)
Voiced by: Shūichirō Umeda
A police detective and one of Rinna's subordinates. He becomes the object of Rinna's affection and offers to have a fake relationship with her to help her sort out her feelings, though whether he reciprocates her feelings or not is unclear.
In Rinna Keibu wa Kokyū ga Dekinai, his name is Meishi Leland (メイシ・リーランド, Meishi Rīrando), a detective working in London.
Danjuro Iwata (岩田団十郎, Iwata Danjuro)
Voiced by: Haruki Ishiya
Masato Nakatani (中谷真斗, Nakatani Masato)
Voiced by: Takuma Nagatsuka
Chikai Matsumoto (松元誓, Matsumoto Chikai)
Voiced by: Hiiro Ishibashi
Rena Yamakawa (山河れな, Yamakawa Rena)
Voiced by: Yū Wakui

== Media ==
=== Manga ===
The series was originally serialized under the title Rinna Keibu wa Kokyū ga Dekinai in Ichijinsha's Monthly Comic Rex magazine between October 27, 2016, and December 27, 2017. The series featured similar characters, but was set in London instead of Japan. The series was compiled into three tankōbon volumes between April 27, 2017, and January 27, 2018.

Ayune Araragi relaunched the series in Kadokawa Shoten's Monthly Shōnen Ace magazine on June 26, 2020. The first tankōbon volume was released on December 25, 2020; ten volumes have been released as of May 2026. In March 2026, Yen Press announced that they had licensed the series for English publication, with the first volume set to release in September later in the year.

==== Volumes ====
===== Rinna Keibu wa Kokyū ga Dekinai =====
No.	Release date	ISBN
1	April 27, 2017	978-4-7580-6658-7
2	January 27, 2018	978-4-7580-6685-3
3	January 27, 2018	978-4-7580-6705-8

===== Isshiki-san Wants to Know About Love =====
No.	Original release date	Original ISBN	English release date	English ISBN
1	December 25, 2020	978-4-04-110932-8	September 22, 2026	979-8-8554-3022-6
2	June 25, 2021	978-4-04-111476-6	January 26, 2027	979-8-8554-4768-2
3	January 26, 2022	978-4-04-112199-3	—	—
4	August 26, 2022	978-4-04-112200-6	—	—
5	April 26, 2023	978-4-04-113628-7	—	—
6	November 25, 2023	978-4-04-114357-5	—	—
7	September 27, 2024	978-4-04-115390-1	—	—
8	April 25, 2025	978-4-04-116139-5	—	—
9	October 23, 2025	978-4-04-116694-9	—	—
10	May 25, 2026	978-4-04-117438-8	—	—

=== Anime ===
An anime television series adaptation was announced on October 17, 2025. It will be produced by Sakura Create and directed by Kazuya Komai, with series composition handled by Deko Akao, characters designed by Shōhei Hamaguchi, and music composed by Michiru. It is set to premiere in January 2027. The opening theme song is "Gō Yoku Koi o Seisu!?" (激しく恋をせいす), performed by Enako.

== Reception ==
The series ranked fifth in a poll by the anime website Anime! Anime! on what manga series respondents wanted to see animated.
