= Stereo Dive Foundation =

Japanese composer and musician (born 1982)

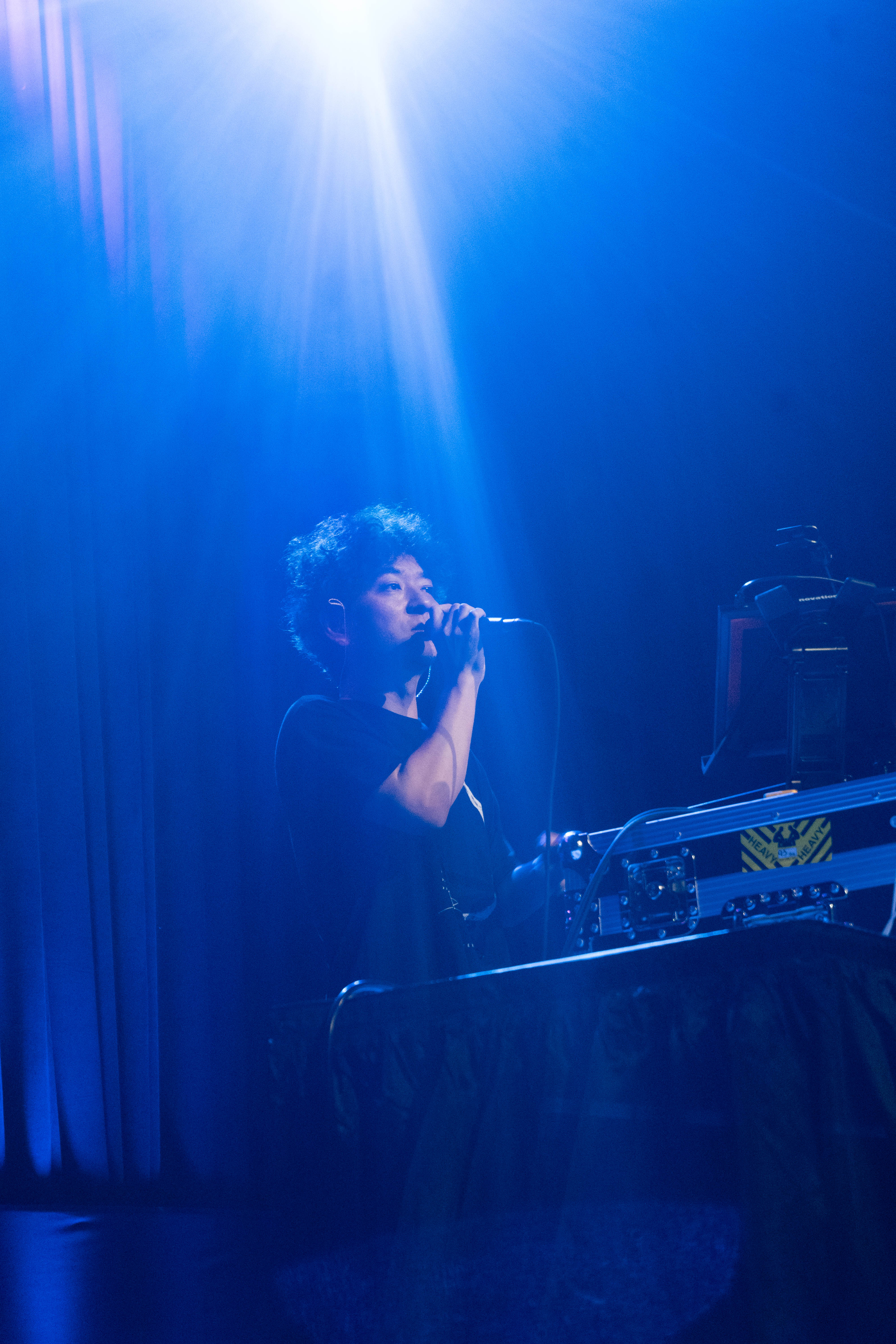
- Stereo Dive Foundation at Kawaii Kon in 2024
- Born: Ryuta Iida (飯田龍太); February 19, 1982 (age 44); Tokyo, Japan
- Other names: RON, R・O・N
- Occupations: Musician; composer; arranger; lyricist; music producer
- Years active: 2004–present
- Musical career
- Genres: Electronic; indie; anime soundtrack; alternative; symphonic; rock; pop; J-pop
- Instruments: Vocals; Piano; Keyboards; Guitar; Bass; Strings
- Label: Lantis
- Website: stereodivefoundation.jp

Stereo Dive Foundation, abbreviated SDF, is a sound-creating project of Japanese singer-songwriter, composer, musician, arranger, and music producer RON. His single, "Daisy", charted at #4 on Japan's Billboard chart and his single, "Omega" charted at #22 on the Oricon Singles Chart His music has been featured in Anime TV series including Beyond the Boundary, Moriarty the Patriot, and That Time I Got Reincarnated as a Slime and he has shared the stage with Zaq, TRUE, and Luck Life, among others.

== Early life and education ==
Ryuta Iida (飯田龍太), known as RON (stage name R・O・N), was born in Tokyo, Japan and began taking classical piano lessons at four years of age. He spent part of his early childhood living in Germany and the US and began writing songs in high school. After returning to Japan to attend college, he won an audition that was held by Sony Music Japan which provided him with opportunities to write music for other artists and pursue a professional career in music. He graduated from Waseda University in 2004.

== Career ==
Iida is best known as a singer, composer, musician (piano, guitar, bass, and string instruments), arranger, and producer of music that is featured in Anime films, TV shows, and video games, including, Futsal Boys!!!!!, Grimgar, Ashes and Illusions, Muv-Luv Alternative, and others. His single, "Daisy," from Beyond the Boundary won "Best ED" at the "Best of Anime: Annual Anime Awards" in 2013. He has released two studio albums, Stereo Dive, (2020), and Stereo Dive 02 (2022) and cites musical influences as Korn, Deftones, and Nine Inch Nails.

Iida is also known by the stage name, RON, and is a co-founder and former band member of Oldcodex (2009 - 2012).

His 2013 single, "Daisy", (ending theme song for Beyond the Boundary) peaked at #4 on Japan's Billboard chart and "Renegade" (opening theme song for Gangsta) charted at #81 on Billboard's Hot 100 in 2015. In 2015, his single, "Renegade", charted at #39 on the Oricon Singles Chart as well as his 2021 single, "Omega" (ending theme song for Moriarty the Patriot), charting at #22.

He has performed in Europe, Canada, the US, and Singapore at Anime conventions such as DoKomi, Animethon, Anime NYC, Anime Weekend Atlanta, Kawaii Kon, and Anime Milwaukee, among others.

== Discography ==
=== Studio albums ===
| Title | Information |
|---|---|
| Stereo Dive | Released: February 5, 2020; Formats: Digital download, CD; Highest Charting: Oricon chart #26 |
| Stereo Dive 02 | Released: April 13, 2022; Formats: Digital download, CD; Highest Charting: Oricon chart #86 |

=== Singles ===
| Title | Year | Notes | Album |
|---|---|---|---|
| "Daisy" | 2013 | Beyond the Boundary (TV series - 18 episodes) - ending theme song - composer, lyrics, arranger, performer | Stereo Dive |
| "Axis" | 2014 | Nobunaga the Fool - (TV series - 24 episodes) - end theme song - composer, performer, lyrics, arranger | Stereo Dive |
| "Renegade" | 2015 | Gangsta - (TV series - 13 episodes) - opening theme song - composer, musician, lyrics, arranger. performer | Stereo Dive |
| "Genesis" | 2016 | Dimension W (TV series - 13 episodes) - opening theme song - composer, performer, lyrics, arranger | Stereo Dive |
| "Chronos" | 2019 | Food Wars!: Shokugeki no Soma (TV series) - opening theme song composer, performer, lyrics, arranger | Stereo Dive |
| "Session" | 2020 | Fan-collaborated single during COVID-19 pandemic | Stereo Dive 02 |
| "Alpha" | 2020 | Moriarty the Patriot (TV series) - ending theme - composer, lyrics, performer, arranger | Stereo Dive 02 |
| "Storyseeker" | 2021 | That Time I Got Reincarnated as a Slime (TV series) -Season 2 ending theme song -composer, lyrics, arranger, performer | Stereo Dive 02 |
| "Omega" | 2021 | Moriarty the Patriot: Part 2 (TV series) - ending theme song - composer, lyrics, performer, arranger | Stereo Dive 02 |
| "Tristar" | 2021 | Muv-Luv Alternative (TV series) - ending theme song - composer, lyrics, performer, arranger | Stereo Dive 02 |
| "Pianissimo" | 2022 | Futsal Boys!!!!! (TV series and soundtrack) - end theme song - composer, lyrics, performer, arranger | Stereo Dive 02 |
| "Tristar" (Complete Collection) | 2022 | | Stereo Dive 02 |
| "Sparkles" | 2022 | That Time I Got Reincarnated as a Slime the Movie: Scarlet Bond (film) - ending theme - composer, lyrics, performer, arranger | Non-album single |
| "Raytracer" | 2023 | Synduality: Noir (TV series) - opening theme song - composer, lyrics, performer | Non-album single |
| "Monogram" | 2023 | That Time I Got Reincarnated as a Slime: Isekai Memories (video game) - composer, performer, lyrics, arranger | Non-album single |
| "Drifters" | 2024 | Synduality: Noir Part 2 (TV series - 24 episodes) - ending theme song - composer, performer, lyrics, arranger | Non-album single |
| "Peacekeeper" | 2024 | That Time I Got Reincarnated as a Slime (TV series) Season 3 - 13 episodes theme song "Peacekeeper" - composer | Non-album single |
| "Katawara" | 2024 | Sengoku Youko: The Thousandfold Chaos Arc (TV series) - opening theme song - composer, lyrics, performer | Non-album single |

== Selected anime filmography ==
- 2024 - I Was Reincarnated as the 7th Prince so I Can Take My Time Perfecting My Magical Ability (TV series) - composer
- 2022 - Princess Connect! Re:Dive (soundtrack vol. 3) - arranger
- 2021 - Skate-Leading Stars (original soundtrack) - composer
- 2021 - Ultraman Trigger: New Generation Tiga (TV series - 3 episodes) - composer, performer, lyrics, arranger
- 2018 - FLCL Progressive (TV mini series) - composer
- 2018 - FLCL Alternative (TV mini series) - composer
- 2017 - Sakura Quest (TV series - 24 episodes) - composer, arranger
- 2016 - Grimgar, Ashes and Illusions (TV series - 13 episodes and soundtrack) - composer
- 2016 - Love Live! Sunshine!! (TV series) - featured song "Guilty Night, Guilty Kiss!" - composer, musician, performer, arranger
- 2016 - Flip Flappers (TV mini series - 13 episodes) - arranger
- 2015 - Aquarion Logos (TV series - 26 episodes) - composer
- 2015 - Starmyu (TV series - 1 episode) - arranger
- 2015 - Chaos Dragon (TV series - 12 episodes) opening theme "ISOtone" composer, lyrics, arranger - ending theme "Sleep Without a Memory" composer, lyrics, arranger
- 2012 - Kuroko's Basketball (TV series - 25 episodes) - composer, arranger
- 2012 - Jormungand: Perfect Order - theme song - composer, arranger
- 2010 - Psychic Detective Yakumo (TV mini series - 13 episodes) - composer, arranger
- 2010 - Togainu no Chi (TV series - 1 episode) - composer, arranger
- 2008 - Kurenai (TV series - 1 episode) - composer, lyrics, arranger
- 2005 - SoltyRei (TV series - 1 episode) - composer, performer
- 2005 - Togainu no Chi - (TV series - 1 episode) - composer, lyrics, arranger
