= Riko Akechi =

Japanese voice actress

- 明智 璃子
- Born: December 22, 2003 (age 22); Hyogo Prefecture, Japan
- Occupation: Voice actress
- Years active: 2024–present
- Agent: 81 Produce

Riko Akechi (明智 璃子, Akechi Riko; born December 22, 2003) is a Japanese voice actress who is affiliated with 81 Produce. She started her career after passing an audition held by 81 Produce in 2020, receiving a Special Award, and formally joined them in April 2024. She voiced Anastasia in Chuhai Lips: Canned Flavor of Married Women and Angela Rose in The Beginning After the End in 2025. In 2026, she will play her first main role as Poemu Kohinata, the female lead of the anime television series The Klutzy Class Monitor and the Girl with the Short Skirt.

== Filmography ==
=== Anime ===
2024

- Senpai is an Otokonoko, Girl (episode 7)

2025

- Medaka Kuroiwa is Impervious to My Charms, Rika (episode 11)
- The Beginning After the End, Angela Rose
- Chuhai Lips: Canned Flavor of Married Women, Anastasia
- Witch Watch, Kanade Gohara (episode 2)

2026

- Star Detective Precure!, Eliza Kurusu
- The Klutzy Class Monitor and the Girl with the Short Skirt, Poemu Kohinata
- Chainsmoker Cat, Tatsurō Ochinpo
- Shiboyugi: Playing Death Games to Put Food on the Table – 44: Cloudy Beach as Mitsuba

2027

- Isshiki-san Wants to Know About Love, Rinna Milford Isshiki
- The Case Files of Biblia Bookstore, Shioriko Shinokawa

=== Video games ===
- Umamusume: Pretty Derby, Sakura Chitose O
