= Straighten Up! Welcome to Shika High's Competitive Dance Club =

Japanese manga series

- First tankōbon volume cover

背すじをピン！と～鹿高競技ダンス部へようこそ～ (Sesuji o Pin! to: Shikakō Kyōgi Dance-bu e Yōkoso)
- Manga
- Written by: Takuma Yokota
- Published by: Shueisha
- English publisher: NA: Viz Media
- Imprint: Jump Comics
- Magazine: Weekly Shōnen Jump
- English magazine: NA: Weekly Shonen Jump
- Original run: May 11, 2015 – February 13, 2017
- Volumes: 10
- icon

Straighten Up! Welcome to Shika High's Competitive Dance Club (Japanese: 背すじをピン！と～鹿高競技ダンス部へようこそ～, Hepburn: Sesuji o Pin! to: Shikakō Kyōgi Dance-bu e Yōkoso) is a Japanese manga series written and illustrated by Takuma Yokota. It was serialized in Shueisha's Weekly Shōnen Jump from May 2015 to February 2017 and published in ten volumes.

== Plot ==
In the Spring, Shika High School welcomes new students, leading to clubs scrambling to recruit them. The competitive dance club does a performance that garners a lot of attention. Masaharu Tsuchiya, a new freshman, is convinced by his friend to go check out the club for the opportunity to have a perverted encounter with a girl; many other students show up for the same reason. However, when the club's president, Masumi Doigaki, appears, they all flee, leaving just Masaharu and Eri Watari, the only female freshman who showed up. They are welcomed into the club and enter the world of competitive dance.

== Publication ==
Written and illustrated by Takuma Yokota, Straighten Up! Welcome to Shika High's Competitive Dance Club ran in Shueisha's Weekly Shōnen Jump from May 11, 2015, to February 13, 2017. The series' individual chapters were collected into ten tankōbon volumes. A spin-off chapter was released in Weekly Shōnen Jump on April 11, 2016.

Viz Media published the series in English in their digital magazine Weekly Shonen Jump as part of their Jump Start initiative.

=== Volumes ===
No.	Release date	ISBN
1	November 4, 2015	978-4-08-880556-6
2	December 4, 2015	978-4-08-880557-3
3	February 4, 2016	978-4-08-880608-2
4	April 4, 2016	978-4-08-880655-6
5	June 3, 2016	978-4-08-880691-4
6	August 4, 2016	978-4-08-880752-2
7	October 4, 2016	978-4-08-880793-5
8	December 2, 2016	978-4-08-880824-6
9	February 3, 2017	978-4-08-881005-8
10	April 4, 2017	978-4-08-881050-8

== Reception ==
In 2016, the series won the Next Manga Award in the print manga category. In a 2017 poll by the Anime! Anime! website, the series ranked first on the list of the top ten completed manga people want to receive an anime adaptation.

== See also ==
- Destroy All Humans. They Can't Be Regenerated., another manga series illustrated by Takuma Yokota
- The Klutzy Class Monitor and the Girl with the Short Skirt, another manga series illustrated by Takuma Yokota
