= Chuhai Lips: Canned Flavor of Married Women =

Japanese manga series

- First digital volume cover, featuring Yui Koriyama

人妻の唇は缶チューハイの味がして (Hitozuma no Kuchibiru wa Kan Chūhai no Aji ga Shite)
- Genre: Erotic romance
- Manga
- Written by: Chinjao Musume
- Illustrated by: Tama Nogami
- Published by: Kodansha
- Magazine: YanMaga Web
- Original run: February 17, 2021 – present
- Volumes: 27 (ebook); 3 (print)
- Anime television series
- Directed by: Hajime Keima
- Written by: Hajime Keima
- Studio: Raiose
- Licensed by: OceanVeil
- Original network: Tokyo MX, BS11 (censored)
- Original run: July 2, 2025 – August 20, 2025
- Episodes: 8 + OVA

Chuhai Lips: Canned Flavor of Married Women (人妻の唇は缶チューハイの味がして, Hitozuma no Kuchibiru wa Kan Chūhai no Aji ga Shite; lit. 'A Married Woman's Lips Taste of Canned Highball') is a Japanese manga series written by Chinjao Musume and illustrated by Tama Nogami. It began serialization on Kodansha's YanMaga Web manga website in February 2021. A short-form anime television series adaptation produced by Raiose aired from July to August 2025.

== Characters ==
Tsuyoshi (ツヨシ)
Voiced by: Takahide Ishii (on-air version), Men Kaidō (Deregula version) (Japanese); Sean Chiplock (English)
Yui Koriyama (郡山結, Koriyama Yui)
Voiced by: Shiho Kawaragi (on-air version), Miyu Anno (Deregula version) (Japanese); Elsie Lovelock (English)
Ai Natsuno (夏野藍, Natsuno Ai)
Voiced by: Madoka Asahina (on-air version), Kokko Mikazuki (Deregula version) (Japanese); Sneha Kumar (English)
Miki Kanzaki (神崎美紀, Kanzaki Miki)
Voiced by: Yuka Nukui (on-air version), Momono Mogi (Deregula version) (Japanese); Laura Welsh (English)
Tamami Miyazawa (宮沢多真魅, Miyazawa Tamami)
Voiced by: Saki Kōsaka (on-air version), Tsuzumi Kinuta (Deregula version) (Japanese); Ashley Quills (English)
Nozomi Kuji (久慈希美, Kuji Nozomi)
Voiced by: Yuri Yamaoka (on-air version), Mitsuko Hachi (Deregula version) (Japanese); Kay Kennedy (English)
Anastasia (アナスタシア, Anasutashia)
Voiced by: Riko Akechi (on-air version), Izuko Akigure (Deregula version) (Japanese); Aife (English)
Simphis
Voiced by: Miho Morisaki (on-air version) (Japanese); Kendell Byrd (English)
Sari Kirihara
Voiced by: Kayo Ishida (on-air version) (Japanese); Chloe Eves (English)

== Media ==
=== Manga ===
Written by Chinjao Musume and illustrated by Tama Nogami, Chuhai Lips: Canned Flavor of Married Women began serialization on Kodansha's YanMaga Web manga website on February 17, 2021. Its chapters have been collected into ebooks and tankōbon volumes. Twenty-seven ebooks and three tankōbon volumes have been released as of May 2026.

No.	Release date	ISBN
1	July 6, 2021 (ebook); June 19, 2024 (print)	978-4-06-535947-1
2	August 5, 2021 (ebook); August 20, 2024 (print)	978-4-06-536557-1
3	October 20, 2021 (ebook); November 20, 2024 (print)	978-4-06-537753-6
4	December 20, 2021 (ebook)	—
5	February 18, 2022 (ebook)	—
6	April 20, 2022 (ebook)	—
7	June 20, 2022 (ebook)	—
8	August 19, 2022 (ebook)	—
9	October 20, 2022 (ebook)	—
10	December 20, 2022 (ebook)	—
11	February 20, 2023 (ebook)	—
12	April 20, 2023 (ebook)	—
13	June 20, 2023 (ebook)	—
14	September 20, 2023 (ebook)	—
15	November 20, 2023 (ebook)	—
16	February 20, 2024 (ebook)	—
17	April 18, 2024 (ebook)	—
18	July 19, 2024 (ebook)	—
19	September 19, 2024 (ebook)	—
20	December 19, 2024 (ebook)	—
21	February 19, 2025 (ebook)	—
22	May 20, 2025 (ebook)	—
23	July 18, 2025 (ebook)	—
24	October 20, 2025 (ebook)	—
25	December 19, 2025 (ebook)	—
26	March 18, 2026 (ebook)	—
27	May 20, 2026 (ebook)	—

=== Anime ===
An anime adaptation produced under WWWave Corporation's new Deregula anime label was announced on February 17, 2025. It was later confirmed to be a short-form television series animated by Raiose and directed and written by Hajime Keima, with Yoriko Karei designing the characters. It aired from July 2 to August 20, 2025, on Tokyo MX and BS11, with the AnimeFesta service streaming the Deregula version with uncensored and extended scenes of the anime. The theme song is "Can't you high!?" performed by Uzuho. WWWave Corporation licensed the series for streaming on OceanVeil.

==== Episodes + OVA ====
01. The Flavor of My Strict Aunts Lips

02. The Flavor of a Sun-Kissed Gyarus Lips

03. The Flavor of a Married Club Senpais Lips

04. The Flavor of My Russian Friends Sisters Lips

05. The Flavor of a Mysterious Tanuki-Faced Married Womans Lips

06. The Flavor of a Baby-Faced Cheeky Married Womans Lips

07. The Flavor of an Otherworldly Married Dark Elfs Lips

08. The Flavor of a Quiet Former Rebel the Barbershop Owners Lips

OVA. In the Aftermath of Yui Koriyama

== Reception ==
By November 2024, the series had over 1.2 million copies in circulation.
