= Destroy All Humans. They Can't Be Regenerated. =

Japanese manga series

- First tankōbon volume cover

すべての人類を破壊する。それらは再生できない。 (Subete no Jinrui o Hakai suru. Sorera wa Saisei Dekinai.)
- Genre: Drama
- Manga
- Written by: Katsura Ise
- Illustrated by: Takuma Yokota
- Published by: Kadokawa Shoten
- English publisher: NA: Viz Media
- Imprint: Kadokawa Comics A
- Magazine: Monthly Shōnen Ace
- Original run: November 26, 2018 – April 25, 2025
- Volumes: 18
- Manga

Timeshift
- Written by: Katsura Ise
- Illustrated by: Takuma Yokota
- Published by: Kadokawa Shoten
- Imprint: Kadokawa Comics A
- Magazine: Monthly Shōnen Ace
- Original run: October 26, 2026 – present
- icon

Destroy All Humans. They Can't Be Regenerated. (Japanese: すべての人類を破壊する。それらは再生できない。, Hepburn: Subete no Jinrui o Hakai suru. Sorera wa Saisei Dekinai.) is a Japanese manga series written by Katsura Ise and illustrated by Takuma Yokota. It follows a pair of academic rivals in middle school growing closer over games of Magic: The Gathering during the late 1990s. The series was serialized in Kadokawa Shoten's Monthly Shōnen Ace magazine from November 2018 to April 2025, with cooperation from Wizards of the Coast LLC.

== Synopsis ==
In 1998, Hajime Kanou is a junior high student and firm otaku enamored with the collectible card game Magic: The Gathering (colloquially referred to as "Magic"), playing games with his classmates every day during breaks. His loud group often catches the attention of Emi Sawatari, the top student of the school with impeccable social standing and perfect grades, who continually berates Hajime's group for bringing such games to school. Since middle school, Hajime has seen Emi as his self-proclaimed academic rival, although is frequently defeated. Their differences in attitudes and personality lead to them not getting along at first.

One day, Hajime pays a visit to a shop specializing in Magic and, to his surprise, finds Emi inside. He discovers that, not only does Emi play Magic, she is one of the most competent players in the store. This meeting ultimately leads to a change in their relationship with them becoming closer together as they get to know each other through their various Magic duels and related encounters.

== Characters ==
Hajime Kanou (神納 はじめ, Kanou Hajime)
Voiced by: Yoshitsugu Matsuoka (PV)
A junior high student nerd who plays Magic: The Gathering everyday, even during breaks.
Emi Sawatari (沢渡 慧美, Sawatari Emi)
Voiced by: Yumiri Hanamori (PV)
The top student of the school who Hajime always see as a worth rival to beat. She excels in academic scores, and is one of the top players of Magic: The Gathering.
Yakumo Subawara
Lou Chantal Scarlette Gerard

== Publication ==
Destroy All Humans. They Can't Be Regenerated. is written by Katsura Ise and illustrated by Takuma Yokota. Prior to serialization, the pair previously published a one-shot version of the manga in the October issue of Monthly Shōnen Ace on August 25, 2018. The series was serialized from the January 2018 issue of the same magazine on November 26, 2018, to the June 2025 issue on April 25, 2025.

To celebrate the release of the third volume on November 26, 2019, a 23-minute "voice comic" video was published on YouTube featuring the voices of Tomoya Takagi, Wataru Katoh, Misaki Yoshioka, and Mayuko Kazama.

A miniseries subtitled Timeshift began serialization in Monthly Shōnen Ace magazine on October 26, 2026.

In May 2024, Viz Media announced that they licensed the series for English publication, with the first volume being released on October 8, 2024.

=== Volumes ===
No.	Original release date	Original ISBN	English release date	English ISBN
1	May 25, 2019	978-4-04-108353-6	October 8, 2024	978-1-9747-4721-4
2	August 26, 2019	978-4-04-108695-7	January 14, 2025	978-1-9747-4959-1
3	November 26, 2019	978-4-04-108854-8	April 8, 2025	978-1-9747-4960-7
4	March 26, 2020	978-4-04-108855-5	July 8, 2025	978-1-9747-5521-9
5	July 21, 2020	978-4-04-109734-2	October 14, 2025	978-1-9747-5855-5
6	November 25, 2020	978-4-04-109735-9	January 13, 2026	978-1-9747-6185-2
7	April 26, 2021	978-4-04-109736-6	April 14, 2026	978-1-9747-6279-8
8	August 26, 2021	978-4-04-111711-8	July 14, 2026	978-1-9747-6501-0
9	January 26, 2022	978-4-04-111712-5	April 13, 2027	978-1-9747-6541-6
10	June 26, 2022	978-4-04-112559-5	—	—
11	October 25, 2022	978-4-04-113034-6	—	—
12	March 25, 2023	978-4-04-113427-6	—	—
13	September 26, 2023	978-4-04-113917-2	—	—
14	December 26, 2023	978-4-04-114550-0	—	—
15	April 26, 2024	978-4-04-114950-8	—	—
16	September 25, 2024	978-4-04-115395-6	—	—
17	January 24, 2025	978-4-04-115817-3	—	—
18	June 26, 2025	978-4-04-116135-7	—	—

== See also ==
- The Klutzy Class Monitor and the Girl with the Short Skirt, another manga series illustrated by Takuma Yokota
- Straighten Up! Welcome to Shika High's Competitive Dance Club, another manga series illustrated by Takuma Yokota
