= The Klutzy Class Monitor and the Girl with the Short Skirt =

Japanese manga series

- First tankōbon volume cover, featuring Poem Kohinata (left) and Togo Sakuradaimon (right)

ポンコツ風紀委員とスカート丈が不適切なJKの話 (Ponkotsu Fūkiiin to Sukāto Take ga Futekisetsu na JK no Hanashi)
- Genre: Romantic comedy
- Manga
- Written by: Takuma Yokota
- Published by: Kodansha
- English publisher: Kodansha (digital)
- Imprint: Sirius KC
- Magazine: Monthly Shōnen Sirius
- Original run: March 26, 2019 – present
- Volumes: 21
- Anime television series
- Directed by: Daiji Iwanaga
- Produced by: Genta Ozaki; Yoshiyuki Shioya; Ayumi Iwasaki; Naoko Itou; Nobuhiko Kurosu; Sachiya Sakikawa; Kenji Kuroda; Keiichi Oomura; Hinako Watanabe; Hideyuki Kachi; Kenji Ebato
- Written by: Masahiro Yokotani
- Music by: Kanki Iwamoto; Hisashi Tenkyū; Takashi Toriyama; Yoshiaki Kitazume
- Studio: Zero-G
- Licensed by: Crunchyroll
- Original network: BS Asahi, Tokyo MX, AT-X
- Original run: April 6, 2026 – June 22, 2026
- Episodes: 12
- icon

The Klutzy Class Monitor and the Girl with the Short Skirt (Note: Japanese: ポンコツ風紀委員とスカート丈が不適切なJKの話, Hepburn: Ponkotsu Fūkiiin to Sukāto Take ga Futekisetsu na JK no Hanashi; lit. 'The Story Between a Dumb Prefect and a High School Girl with an Inappropriate Skirt Length') is a Japanese manga series written and illustrated by Takuma Yokota. The series began serialization in Kodansha's Monthly Shōnen Sirius magazine in March 2019, and has been compiled into twenty-one tankōbon volumes as of August 2026. An anime television series adaptation produced by Zero-G aired from April to June 2026.

== Plot ==
The series follows Togo Sakuradaimon, a school prefect with a penchant for discipline. He is in constant conflict with Poem Kohinata, a gyaru student over her violations of school guidelines. However, after the two find themselves in a supplementary class, Poem discovers that Togo is lacking in academic skills, particularly in mathematics. The two form a complicated relationship, with each knowing each other's weaknesses.

== Characters ==
Togo Sakuradaimon (桜大門 統悟, Sakuradaimon Tōgo)
Voiced by: Junya Enoki, Chika Anzai^{Ep. 8 credits} (young) (Japanese); Adam Gibbs, Morgan Berry (young) (English)
The school's prefect and a strict disciplinarian. Due to this, he is not fond of Poem, often scolding her for not following the school rules. Many students see him in low regard due to his strictness, often considering him "boring". In contrast to his strict personality, he lacks academic ability, and particularly has difficulties with mathematics. Despite his initial hostile relationship with Poem, they later develop feelings for each other and start dating.
Poem Kohinata (小日向 微笑, Kohinata Poemu)
Voiced by: Riko Akechi (Japanese); Alexis Tipton (English)
A girl with a gyaru appearance, whom Togo scolds for keeping her skirt short and bleaching her hair. She often gets into conflicts with Togo, but over time comes to understand him. She is ashamed of her name due to its unusual pronunciation, (Note: As the name is read with a transliteration of English "poem", it is unusual as a Japanese name. It is spelled with a form of (jukujikun-based) ateji from 微笑む (hohoemu or hōemu; 'to smile'), rather than novel gikun as is most common in kira kira names, such as 海 ('sea') read as Marin ("marine") or 光 ('light' read as Raito ("light").) and she finds it annoying when Togo calls her by her given name. Because of this, she decides to call Togo by his given name as well. She later develops feelings for Togo as well. Some of her friends call her "Poe".
Yu Izubuchi (出淵 遊, Izubuchi Yū)
Voiced by: Hayato Dojima (Japanese); Aaron Campbell (English)
Togo's friend and a member of the health committee. He was formerly a delinquent, leading to him having a rough way of speaking and him usually wearing a white coat. Motoko has a crush on him due to his looks and tendency of princess-carrying injured students, including her. He aims to work in healthcare, having been inspired by an encounter during his delinquency days.
Seiichi Tsukishima (月島 聖一, Tsukishima Seiichi)
Voiced by: Jun Fukuyama (Japanese); Jordan Dash Cruz (English)
Togo's classmate and a member of the library committee. He has two appearances: his true short, nerdy self with buck teeth, and his tall, handsome form that he transforms into when he is surrounded by books or carrying them.
Motoko Akina (秋名 素子, Akina Motoko)
Voiced by: Yuina Itō (Japanese); Bryn Apprill (English)
Poem's friend who has an energetic personality and twintailed hair. Her poor academic performance makes her friends worried about her. She is always teased by Poem and Rui for her crush on Yu.
Rui Tasaki (田崎 類, Tasaki Rui)
Voiced by: Ayaka Fukuhara (Japanese); Sarah Roach (English)
Poem's friend who has an easygoing personality and short hair. She is a member of the manga research club and is a fan of boys' love works.
Nadeshiko Yamato (大和撫子, Yamato Nadeshiko)
Voiced by: Yūko Kaida (Japanese); Tia Ballard (English)
The student council president who is popular for her beauty and intellect. She is rumored to have defeated delinquents, including Yu back during his delinquent days. Her name is a reference to the Yamato nadeshiko archetype.
Kaoru Kogori (古郡薫, Kogori Kaoru)
Voiced by: Tetsu Inada (Japanese); Sean Letourneau (English)
The student council vice president from a wealthy family. Friends with Nadeshiko since childhood, he is always striving to catch up and surpass her. This does not stop the two of them from spending summer breaks at Kaoru's family's villa in Enoshima.

== Media ==
=== Manga ===
Written and illustrated by Takuma Yokota, The Klutzy Class Monitor and the Girl with the Short Skirt began serialization in Kodansha's Monthly Shōnen Sirius on March 26, 2019. The series has been compiled into twenty-one tankōbon volumes as of August 2026.

In March 2026, the series was added to Kodansha's K Manga service.

No.	Release date	ISBN
1	October 9, 2019	978-4-06-517226-1
2	March 9, 2020	978-4-06-518898-9
3	June 9, 2020	978-4-06-519799-8
4	September 9, 2020	978-4-06-520821-2
5	December 9, 2020	978-4-06-521889-1
6	April 8, 2021	978-4-06-522846-3
7	July 8, 2021	978-4-06-523727-4
8	November 9, 2021	978-4-06-525149-2
9	June 9, 2022	978-4-06-527763-8
10	November 9, 2022	978-4-06-529262-4
11	March 9, 2023	978-4-06-530964-3
12	September 8, 2023 (ebook); March 9, 2026 (print)	978-4-06-542772-9
13	February 8, 2024 (ebook); March 9, 2026 (print)	978-4-06-542773-6
14	June 6, 2024 (ebook); March 9, 2026 (print)	978-4-06-542780-4
15	October 8, 2024 (ebook); March 9, 2026 (print)	978-4-06-542774-3
16	January 17, 2025 (ebook); March 9, 2026 (print)	978-4-06-542758-3
17	April 9, 2025 (ebook); March 9, 2026 (print)	978-4-06-542775-0
18	September 9, 2025 (ebook); March 9, 2026 (print)	978-4-06-542783-5
19	December 9, 2025 (ebook); March 9, 2026 (print)	978-4-06-542778-1
20	March 9, 2026	978-4-06-542779-8
21	August 7, 2026	978-4-06-543756-8

=== Anime ===
An anime television series adaptation was announced on April 8, 2025. The series was produced by Zero-G and directed by Daiji Iwanaga, with Yō Himuro designing the characters. Masahiro Yokotani supervised and wrote the scripts along with Takahito Ōnishi and Tomoko Konparu. Kanki Iwamoto, Hisashi Tenkyū, Takashi Toriyama, and Yoshiaki Kitazume composed the music. The series aired from April 6 to June 22, 2026 on BS Asahi's Anime A programming block and other networks. The opening theme song is "Hitorigoto" (ヒトリゴト; 'Monologue'), performed by Osage, and the ending theme song is "Heya to Garakuta to Watashi" (部屋とガラクタと私; 'My Room, Junk, & Me'), performed by Me Minor. Crunchyroll is streaming the series.

==== Episodes ====
No.	Title	Directed by (Note: Production staff information is taken from the ending credits of each episode.)	Written by	Storyboard by	Original release date
1	"The Class Monitor is a Klutz"; Transliteration: "Fūkiiin ga Ponkotsu Datta Hanashi" (Japanese: 風紀委員がポンコツだった話)	Daiji Iwanaga	Masahiro Yokotani	Daiji Iwanaga	April 6, 2026
1	"The School Girl's Friends Get Involved With The Klutz"; Transliteration: "JK no Yūjin-tachi to Ponkotsu ga Karamu Hanashi" (Japanese: JKの友人たちとポンコツがからむ話)	Daiji Iwanaga	Masahiro Yokotani	Daiji Iwanaga	April 6, 2026
1	"The Klutzy Class Monitor and the Health Representative"; Transliteration: "Ponkotsu Fūkiiin to Hoken Īin no Hanashi" (Japanese: ポンコツ風紀委員と保健委員の話)	Daiji Iwanaga	Masahiro Yokotani	Daiji Iwanaga	April 6, 2026
2	"The Klutzy Class Monitor and the Library Assistant"; Transliteration: "Ponkotsu Fuukiiin to Toshoiin no Hanashi" (Japanese: ポンコツ風紀委員と図書委員の話)	Kousaku Taniguchi	Masahiro Yokotani	Kousaku Taniguchi	April 13, 2026
2	"The Time She Spent Lunch With the Klutz"; Transliteration: "Ponkotsu to Ohiruyasumi o Sugoshita Hanashi" (Japanese: ポンコツとお昼休みを過ごした話)	Kousaku Taniguchi	Masahiro Yokotani	Kousaku Taniguchi	April 13, 2026
3	"The Older Gal Who's Close to the Klutz"; Transliteration: "Ponkotsu to Shin Shigena Jōkyūsei gyaru no Hanashi" (Japanese: ポンコツと親しげな上級生ギャルの話)	Kousaku Taniguchi	Tomoko Konparu	Daiji Iwanaga	April 20, 2026
3	"The Student Council of the Klutz's School"; Transliteration: "Ponkotsu ga Kayou Kōkō no Seito-kai no Hanashi" (Japanese: ポンコツが通う高校の生徒会の話)	Kousaku Taniguchi	Tomoko Konparu	Daiji Iwanaga	April 20, 2026
4	"A Day Off With The Klutz"; Transliteration: "Ponkotsu to Sugosu Kyūjitsu no Hanashi" (Japanese: ポンコツと過ごす休日の話)	Aya Ikeda; Naoyuki Katou (Note: Rap Battle Episode Director (ラップバトル演出)); Daiji Iwanaga (Note: Episode Direction Supervisor (演出監修))	Takahito Oonishi	Yoshitaka Yasuda; Daiji Iwanaga	April 27, 2026
4	"The Klutz Gets Plunged Into Battle On The Streets"; Transliteration: "Ponkotsu ga Machijū de Batoru o Shikake Rareru Hanashi" (Japanese: ポンコツが街中でバトルを仕掛けられる話)	Aya Ikeda; Naoyuki Katou; Daiji Iwanaga	Takahito Oonishi	Yoshitaka Yasuda; Daiji Iwanaga	April 27, 2026
5	"The Klutzy Health Representative And The Schoolgirl Who Slips Often"; Transliteration: "Ponkotsu Hoken Iin to Yoku Korobu JK no Hanashi" (Japanese: ポンコツ保健委員とよく転ぶJKの話)	Tomomi Mochizuki	Masahiro Yokotani	Tomomi Mochizuki	May 4, 2026
5	"Taking More Supplementary Lessons With the Klutz On the Day Her Little Sister is Touring the Klutz's School"; Transliteration: "Ponkotsu no Iru Kōkō ni Imōto ga Kengaku ni Kuru hi ni Mata Ponkotsu to Hoshū o Ukeru Hanashi" (Japanese: ポンコツのいる高校に妹が見学に来る日にまたポンコツと補習を受ける話)	Tomomi Mochizuki	Masahiro Yokotani	Tomomi Mochizuki	May 4, 2026
6	"Drawing BL of the Klutz"; Transliteration: "Ponkotsu wo Neta ni BL wo Egaku Hanashi" (Japanese: ポンコツをネタにBLを描く話)	Kensuke Saka	Takahito Oonishi	Yoshitaka Yasuda; Mina Okita	May 11, 2026
6	"The Klutz Studies Diligently"; Transliteration: "Ponkotsu ga Majime ni Benkyou Suru Hanashi" (Japanese: ポンコツがまじめに勉強する話)	Kensuke Saka	Takahito Oonishi	Yoshitaka Yasuda; Mina Okita	May 11, 2026
6	"Buying Swimsuits To Hang Out with the Klutz's Friends"; Transliteration: "Ponkotsu-tachi to Asobi ni Iku Tame ni Mizugi wo Kau Hanashi" (Japanese: ポンコツたちと遊びにいくために水着を買う話)	Kensuke Saka	Takahito Oonishi	Yoshitaka Yasuda; Mina Okita	May 11, 2026
7	"Having Fun At The Beach With The Klutzes"; Transliteration: "Ponkotsu-tachi to Umi ni Asobini Iku Hanashi" (Japanese: ポンコツたちと海に遊びにいく話)	Yoshitaka Yasuda	Takahito Oonishi	Yoshitaka Yasuda	May 18, 2026
8	"The Klutz Suddenly Had An Earnest Look In His Eyes"; Transliteration: "Ponkotsu ga Fui ni Massugu na me o shita hanashi" (Japanese: ポンコツが不意に真っ直ぐな目をした話)	Daiji Iwanaga	Tomoko Konparu	Daiji Iwanaga	May 25, 2026
9	"The Klutz and the High School Girl's Summer Break Plus the Start of Their Second Semester"; Transliteration: "Ponkotsu to JK no Natsuyasumi to Nigakki Shonichi no Hanashi" (Japanese: ポンコツとJKの夏休みと二学期初日の話)	Kensuke Saka; Harumichi Nakahara	Tomoko Konparu	Tomomi Mochizuki	June 1, 2026
10	"The Klutzes Prepare For The Cultural Festival"; Transliteration: "Ponkotsu-tachi to Bunkasai o Junbi Suru Hanashi" (Japanese: ポンコツたちと文化祭を準備する話)	Takeshi Shiga	Masahiro Yokotani	Daiji Iwanaga	June 8, 2026
11	"The Klutzes Enjoy the Cultural Festival"; Transliteration: "Ponkotsu-tachi ga Bunkasai o Tanoshimu Hanashi" (Japanese: ポンコツたちが文化祭を楽しむ話)	Yoshinori Kitayama; Hideyuki Satake	Takahito Oonishi	Mina Okita	June 15, 2026
12	"The Klutzy Class Monitor and the Girl with the Short Skirt"; Transliteration: "Ponkotsu Fūkiiin to Sukāto Take ga Futekisetsu na JK no Hanashi" (Japanese: ポンコツ風紀委員とスカート丈が不適切なJKの話)	Daiji Iwanaga	Masahiro Yokotani	Mina Okita; Daiji Iwanaga	June 22, 2026

== See also ==
- Destroy All Humans. They Can't Be Regenerated., another manga series illustrated by Takuma Yokota
- Straighten Up! Welcome to Shika High's Competitive Dance Club, another manga series illustrated by Takuma Yokota
