= Delusional Monthly Magazine =

Japanese anime television series

- Key visual

月刊モー想科学 (Gekkan Mōsō Kagaku)
- Created by: Ichigo Umatani
- Anime television series
- Directed by: Chizuru Miyawaki
- Written by: Hiroko Kanasugi
- Music by: Akiyuki Tateyama
- Studio: OLM Team Yoshioka
- Licensed by: Crunchyroll
- Original network: Tokyo MX, BS Asahi
- Original run: January 11, 2024 – March 28, 2024
- Episodes: 12

Delusional Monthly Magazine (月刊モー想科学, Gekkan Mōsō Kagaku) is an original Japanese anime television series produced by OLM. It is directed by Chizuru Miyawaki and written by Hiroko Kanasugi, with Akiyuki Tateyama as music designer and Miyawaki as character designer, with Akane Hirota adapting the designs for animation. The series aired from January to March 2024.

== Plot ==
In the town of Most City, a publishing company publishes the science magazine Monthly Moso Science, which contains articles about supernatural events. Taro J. Suzuki, Jiro Tanaka, and his dog Saburo work at the publishing company under its editor-in-chief, Catherine Sue. After a visit from scientist Gorō Satō, they become involved in an investigation into the mysterious Mo Continent, which is said to have sunk long ago, and its inhabitants, the Motarians, as the White Pegasus Company seeks to collect the MOParts, which are said to raise the Mo Continent when gathered, before they do.

== Characters ==
=== Monthly Moso Science ===
Tarō J. Suzuki (タロー・J・鈴木)
Voiced by: Takahide Ishii
A 28-year-old man and an editor for Monthly Moso Science. Because of his frail body, he wishes to retire and become a househusband; to this end, he is working for Moment Marriage to potentially find romance, but has been unsuccessful. He has the ability to see things that others cannot, and using a MOPart, he can transform into his Motarian form, which resembles a tiger.
Jirō Tanaka (ジロー・田中)
Voiced by: Kazutomi Yamamoto
A 10-year-old boy who works as an assistant for the editorial department of Monthly Moso Science. He has healing powers, and using a MOPart, he can transform into his Motarian form, which resembles a ram. It is later revealed that he was the prince of the Mo Continent and that his father, the king, was responsible for sinking the Continent to ensure that Ra Mo could not be activated, but not before arranging for its inhabitants to be reincarnated as humans. He has been reincarnated across time to ensure that Ra Mo is not activated.
Saburō (サブロー)
Voiced by: Yusuke Shirai
Jirō's Afghan Hound dog, who can understand human speech and accompanies the staff of Monthly Moso Science. Using a MOPart, he can transform into his Motarian form, which is a man who wears clothes resembling that of ancient Roman or ancient Greek clothing and plays a harp. It is later revealed that he was once a bard of the Mo Continent.
Gorō Satō (ゴロー・佐藤)
Voiced by: Shun'ichi Toki
An 18-year-old man who once worked at a science research institute until he was fired and now works at the publishing company.
Catherine Sue (キャサリン・スー, Kyasarin Sū)
Voiced by: Rie Kugimiya
A 29-year-old woman and the editor-in-chief of Monthly Moso Science, who recruited Taro and Jirō to work for her. It is later revealed that she is the main antagonist, being a Motarian who seeks to activate the weapon Ra Mo to eradicate humanity, as her ancestors had planned. To this end, she recruited them to gather the MOParts for her.

=== White Pegasus Company ===
Edward Chi (エドワード・チー, Edowādo Chī)
Voiced by: Tomokazu Sugita
A 34-year-old man who is the head of the White Pegasus Company (ホワイトペガサス, Howaito Pegasasu).
Perch (パーチ, Pāchi)
Voiced by: Anan Furuya
A 15-year-old boy who is an employee of White Pegasus and a subordinate to Edward Chi. He and Noin are identical twins.
Noin (ノイン)
Voiced by: Yūki Inoue
A 15-year-old boy who is an employee of White Pegasus and a subordinate to Edward Chi. He and Perch are identical twins.

=== Other ===
Nancy (ナンシー, Nanshī)
Voiced by: Chiwa Saitō
A woman.
Rock (ロック, Rokku)
Voiced by: Tomomichi Nishimura
The owner of the coffee shop "Rock".

== Production ==
The series aired on Tokyo MX and BS Asahi from January 11 to March 28, 2024. The opening theme song is Over Scientific! (オーバーサイエンてぃふぃっく！, Ōbā Saienteifikku!), performed by the main cast (Takahide Ishii, Kazutomi Yamamoto, Yusuke Shirai, Shun'ichi Toki), while the ending theme song is "SCIENCE", performed by Shun'ichi Toki. Crunchyroll streamed the series worldwide except Asia.

== Episodes ==
No.	Title (Note: All English titles are taken from Crunchyroll.)	Directed by	Written by	Storyboarded by	Original release date
1	"More than Shocking! Taro's Transformation!"; Transliteration: "Mo～, Bikkuri!? Tarō no Henshin?" (Japanese: も～、びっくり！？ タローの変身？)	Norio Nitta	Hiroko Kanasugi	Chizuru Miyawaki	January 11, 2024
2	"Hold on a Moment, Why Are You Working Here!?"; Transliteration: "Mo～, Omae! Nani Katte ni Hataraiten no？" (Japanese: も～、お前！何勝手に働いてんの？)	Nozomi Ishii	Hiroko Kanasugi	Kenichi Nishida	January 18, 2024
3	"More Than Just Singing!? Musical Speak!?"; Transliteration: "Mo～, Tomaranai!? Myūjikaru Kuchō……!?" (Japanese: も～、止まらない！？ ミュージカル口調……！？)	Mayu Numayama	Hiroko Kanasugi	Jōji Shimura	January 25, 2024
4	"Monstrous Mystery!? The Secret of Loch Nuss"; Transliteration: "Mo～, Fushigi!? Nusu ko no Himitsu" (Japanese: も～、不思議！？ ヌス湖の秘密)	Sayaka Yamai	Katsuhiko Chiba	Sayaka Yamai	February 1, 2024
5	"What're You Moping About?! The Ice Prince"; Transliteration: "Mo～, Nani Nayanderuno? Hikami no Kikōshi" (Japanese: も～、ナニ悩んでるの？ 氷上の貴公子)	Nozomi Ishii	Katsuhiko Chiba	Tomoko Akiyama; Norio Nitta	February 8, 2024
6	"There're Whole Mobs of Them!? This Is Where the Cats Gather!"; Transliteration: "Mo, Nande? Koko ga Neko no Tamariba!?" (Japanese: も～、なんで？ ここが猫のたまり場！？)	Hiroshi Kimura; Fukutaro Hattori	Hiroko Kanasugi	Norio Nitta	February 15, 2024
7	"The Moment Is Here! A Matchmaking Party"; Transliteration: "Mo～Retsu!? Omiai Pāti" (Japanese: も～レツ！？ お見合いパーティ)	Norio Nitta	Hiroko Kanasugi	Jōji Shimura	February 22, 2024
8	"Body Moving! Walk One Dog and More Will Follow"; Transliteration: "Mo～Ken! Ken mo Arukeba mō Niataru" (Japanese: も～犬(ケン)！ 犬も歩けばモーに当たる)	Mayu Numayama	Katsuhiko Chiba	Takeshi Mori	February 29, 2024
9	"Mystery Moments! The Young Genius's Past"; Transliteration: "Mo～, Nazodarake! Tensai Shōjo no Kako" (Japanese: も～、謎だらけ！ 天才少女の過去)	Sayaka Yamai	Chizuru Miyawaki	Sayaka Yamai	March 7, 2024
10	"Holy Moly! Fight and a Continental Rising!"; Transliteration: "Mo～, Iyada! Kenka de Tairiku Fujō!?" (Japanese: も～、イヤだ！ ケンカで大陸浮上！？)	Hideaki Oba	Hiroko Kanasugi	Hideaki Oba	March 14, 2024
11	"Move Out! Catherine, Why Didn't You Warn Us?!"; Transliteration: "Mo～, Kītenaiyo! Kyasarin！" (Japanese: も～、聞いてないよ！ キャサリン！)	Nozomi Ishii	Hiroko Kanasugi	Takeshi Mori	March 21, 2024
12	"The Unbelievable World, In Motion!"; Transliteration: "Mo～, Konoyo wa Kisōtengai!" (Japanese: も～、この世は奇想天外！)	Norio Nitta	Hiroko Kanasugi	Jōji Shimura	March 28, 2024
