= Futsal Boys!!!!! =

Japanese multimedia franchise

- Promotional image

フットサルボーイズ!!!!! (Futtosaru Bōizu!!!!!)
- Genre: Sports (Futsal)
- Anime television series
- Directed by: Yukina Hiiro
- Written by: Shōji Yonemura
- Music by: R・O・N
- Studio: Diomedéa
- Licensed by: Crunchyroll
- Original network: Tokyo MX, BS11, MBS
- Original run: January 9, 2022 – March 27, 2022
- Episodes: 12
- Video game

Futsal Boys!!!!! High-Five League
- Developer: Bandai Namco Entertainment
- Publisher: Bandai Namco Entertainment
- Platform: iOS, Android

Futsal Boys!!!!! (Japanese: フットサルボーイズ!!!!!, Hepburn: Futtosaru Bōizu!!!!!) was a Japanese multimedia franchise based on futsal. An anime television series produced by Diomedéa aired from January to March 2022, and a mobile video game developed by Bandai Namco Entertainment was also released. The game's service ended on July 28, 2022.

== Characters ==
=== Koyo Futsal Club (Main characters) ===
Haru Yamato (大和 晴, Yamato Haru)
Voiced by: Ryōta Takara
Seiichiro Sakaki (榊 星一郎, Sakaki Seiichiro)
Voiced by: Shūto Ishimori
Toi Tsukioka (月丘 柊依, Tsukioka Toi)
Voiced by: Kohei Yoshiwara
Tsubaki Yukinaga (幸永 椿貴, Yukinaga Tsubaki)
Voiced by: Ryōtarō Yamaguchi
Ryu Nagumo (南雲 竜, Nagumo Ryū)
Voiced by: Kazuki Furuta
Taiga Amakado (天門 泰雅, Amakado Taiga)
Voiced by: Yasunao Sakai

=== Other characters ===
Louis Kashiragi (樫良木ルイ, Kashiragi Louis)
Voiced by: Hiromu Mineta
Shin Yuki (結城心, Yūki Shin)
Voiced by: Yūya Arai
Takumi Kuga (久我巧生, Kuga Takumi)
Voiced by: Satoru Murakami
Kaito Kazanin (花山院快斗, Kazanin Kaito)
Voiced by: Junpei Baba
Sei Kyogoku (京極聖, Kyogoku Sei)
Voiced by: Naoya Miyase
Tomoe Futaba (二葉ともえ, Futaba Tomoe)
Voiced by: Tomoya Yamamoto
Kyōsuke Aiba (相庭京介, Aiba Kyōsuke)
Voiced by: Kazuki Ura
Rio Hanamura (花村理央, Hanamura Rio)
Voiced by: Keita Tada
Nozomi Kōmori (昂守希, Kōmori Nozomi)
Voiced by: Takao Sakuma
Natsuki Sogō (十河夏輝, Sogō Natsuki)
Voiced by: Mizuki Chiba
Yukimaru Kurama (鞍馬雪丸, Kurama Yukimaru)
Voiced by: Minato Kamimura
Ren Kiryu (桐生蓮, Kiryu Ren)
Voiced by: TAKA
Shun Shirakawa (白河瞬, Shirakawa Shun)
Voiced by: Nobuaki Oka
Togo Tachibana (橘藤吾, Tachibana Togo)
Voiced by: Shōichirō Ōmi
Ayato Imazono (今園彩人, Imazono Ayato)
Voiced by: Ayato Morinaga
Asa Minase (水無瀬亜佐, Minase Asa)
Voiced by: Takeru Kikuchi
Soya Akiduki (秋月奏夜, Akiduki Soya)
Voiced by: Takuya Tsuda
Ao Asahina (朝比奈碧, Asahina Ao)
Voiced by: Keito Okuyama
Tokinari Tennoji (天王寺刻成, Tennoji Tokinari)
Voiced by: Yoshitsugu Kawashima
Ryutaro Sera (世良龍太朗, Sera Ryutaro)
Voiced by: Sousuke Shimokawa
Ryosuke Minase (水無瀬涼佑, Minase Ryosuke)
Voiced by: Takahide Ishii
Emilio Garcia (ガルシア・エミリオ, Garushia Emirio)
Voiced by: Ryōsuke Kozuka
Saku Hasumi (蓮美朔, Hasumi Saku)
Voiced by: Tsubasa Kizu

== Media ==
=== Anime ===
The project was first revealed on October 4, 2019, with Diomedéa to produce the animation. In February 2021, it was revealed that the anime series would premiere in 2021. However, the anime was delayed to 2022. The delay announcement also confirmed the anime would be a television series. The series is directed by Yukina Hiiro, with scripts by Shōji Yonemura, character designs by Tomomi Ishikawa, and music by R・O・N. It aired from January 9 to March 27, 2022, on Tokyo MX, BS11, and MBS. Takao Sakuma performed the opening theme song "Bravemaker," while STEREO DIVE FOUNDATION performed the ending theme song "Pianissimo". Funimation streamed the series outside of Asia. A 5-episode short anime was bundled with the series' sixth Blu-ray/DVD volume on September 28, 2022.

==== Episodes ====
No.	Title	Directed by (Note: Information is taken from the ending credits of each episode.)	Written by	Storyboarded by	Original release date
1	"A Dream's Kickoff"; Transliteration: "Yume, Kikku Ofu!" (Japanese: 夢、キックオフ！)	Monjirō Kokarako	Shōji Yonemura	Natsuo Sōta	January 9, 2022
2	"Play-Caller Sakaki?"; Transliteration: "Shireitō Sakaki?" (Japanese: 司令塔・榊？)	Ageha Kochōran	Yoshifumi Fukushima	Mitsuko Takeuchi; Kōji Yoshikawa	January 16, 2022
3	"First Match! Adalbert"; Transliteration: "Shosen! Ādaruberuto" (Japanese: 初戦！アーダルベルト)	Yukina Hiiro	Shinzō Fujita	Natsuo Sōta	January 23, 2022
4	"Taiga and Ryu"; Transliteration: "Taiga to Ryū" (Japanese: 泰雅と竜)	Yukina Hiiro	Shōji Yonemura	Natsuo Sōta	January 30, 2022
5	"The Unforgettable Past"; Transliteration: "Kienai Kako" (Japanese: 消えない過去)	Tana Akasa	Yoshifumi Fukushima	Hitoyuki Matsui	February 6, 2022
6	"Surpass!"; Transliteration: "Koeru!" (Japanese: 超える！)	Monjirō Kokarako	Shinzō Fujita	Hitoyuki Matsui	February 13, 2022
7	"Sparkling Stars! Amanogawa Gakuen!"; Transliteration: "Kirameku Hoshiboshi! Amanogawa Gakuen!" (Japanese: きらめく星々！天ノ川学園！)	Tana Akasa	Shōji Yonemura	Mitsuko Takeuchi; Kōji Yoshikawa	February 20, 2022
8	"WE ARE FUN☆TASISTA"	Ageha Kochōran	Yoshifumi Fukushima	Takeshi Mori	February 27, 2022
9	"Team Play"; Transliteration: "Chīmu Purei" (Japanese: チームプレイ)	Monjirō Kokarako	Shinzō Fujita	Monjirō Kokarako; Maho Andō	March 6, 2022
10	"What I Don't Want to Lose"; Transliteration: "Ushinaitaku Nai Mono" (Japanese: 失いたくないもの)	Maho Andō	Shōji Yonemura	Shigeru Kimiya	March 13, 2022
11	"Unerasable Memories"; Transliteration: "Kesenai Kioku" (Japanese: 消せない記憶)	Yukina Hiiro; Tana Akasa	Shinzō Fujita	Shigeru Kimiya	March 20, 2022
12	"Unconcedable Dream (Goal)"; Transliteration: "Yuzurenai Gōru" (Japanese: ゆずれない夢(ゴール))	Yukina Hiiro; Maho Andō	Yoshifumi Fukushima	Hitoyuki Matsui	March 27, 2022

=== Video game ===
A video game for iOS and Android developed by Bandai Namco Entertainment, titled Futsal Boys!!!!! High-Five League, was announced alongside the anime series. It was originally set to release in 2021, but was later delayed in order to improve the quality of the game.
