= Takahide Ishii =

Japanese voice actor

- 石井孝英
- Born: 3 June
- Occupations: Voice actor; singer
- Years active: 2015–present
- Employer: With Line
- Notable work: Cute High Earth Defense Club Happy Kiss as Nanao Wakura; Dimension High School as Junpei Shirayama; Futsal Boys!!!!! as Ryosuke Minase; Delusional Monthly Magazine as Tarō J. Suzuki; Plus-Sized Elf as Tomoatsu Naoe

Takahide Ishii (石井 孝英, Ishii Takahide; born 3 June) is a Japanese voice actor from Ibaraki Prefecture, affiliated with With Line. He started voice acting after his sister took him to see a musical and after being impressed by the first live performance of voice actor Mamoru Miyano. He has starred as Nanao Wakura in Cute High Earth Defense Club Happy Kiss, Junpei Shirayama in Dimension High School, Ryosuke Minase in Futsal Boys!!!!!, Tarō J. Suzuki in Delusional Monthly Magazine, and Tomoatsu Naoe in Plus-Sized Elf.

== Biography ==
Takahide Ishii, a native of Ibaraki Prefecture, was born on 3 June. He fell in love with anime after watching The Law of Ueki as a sixth grade elementary school student. He was initially interested in stock trading and becoming an illustrator, but decided to go into voice acting after his sister took him to see a musical and after being impressed by Mamoru Miyano's first live performance. His mother had taken him to the performance after someone she knew was invited to be a backup dancer there. He was educated at Tokyo Announce Gakuin. In 2013, he passed the 7th Seiyu Awards New Voice Actor Discovery Auditions.

In 2018, he starred as Nanao Wakura in Cute High Earth Defense Club Happy Kiss and Junpei Shirayama in Dimension High School, and performed "Here We Go!", the anime's opening theme, as part of the tie-in unit 4 Dimensions. In 2022, he starred as Ryosuke Minase in the Futsal Boys!!!!! anime, and performed "Higher Goals", the theme song for their game Futsal Boys!!!!! High-Five League', alongside the other twenty-eight main cast members. In 2024, he was cast as Tarō J. Suzuki in Delusional Monthly Magazine and Tomoatsu Naoe in Plus-Sized Elf.

Ishii lists fighting games and first-person shooters as his hobbies. He began gaming while he was three and once broke his arm, which left him holding on to a controller while being in a cast. At the time, his parents were surprised by his interest in games.

== Filmography ==
=== Animated television ===
| Year | Title | Role | Ref. |
|---|---|---|---|
| 2015 | Million Doll | Tarōmaru | |
| 2018 | Cute High Earth Defense Club Happy Kiss | Nanao Wakura | |
| 2019 | Ace of Diamond Act II | Tomobe | |
| 2019 | Actors: Songs Connection | Doctor-in-charge, police officer, government official | |
| 2019 | Dimension High School | Junpei Shirayama | |
| 2019 | Kedama no Gonjirō | Buta Butler | |
| 2019 | RobiHachi | cameraman | |
| 2021 | Cells at Work! Code Black | generic cell | |
| 2021 | Futsal Boys!!!!! | Ryosuke Minase | |
| 2021 | Life Lessons with Uramichi Oniisan | clerk | |
| 2022 | Aharen-san wa Hakarenai | male student | |
| 2022 | Shoot! Goal to the Future | Ayumu Gotō | |
| 2022 | Vermeil in Gold | examinee | |
| 2023 | I Shall Survive Using Potions! | thief | |
| 2024 | Delusional Monthly Magazine | Tarō J. Suzuki | |
| 2024 | Plus-Sized Elf | Tomoatsu Naoe | |
| 2025 | Hitozuma no Kuchibiru wa Kan Chūhai no Aji ga Shite | Tsuyoshi (on-air version) | |

=== Animated film ===
| Year | Title | Role | Notes | Source |
|---|---|---|---|---|
| 2025 | Cute High Earth Defense Club Eternal Love! | Nanao Wakura | | |

=== Original net animation ===
| Year | Title | Role | Ref. |
|---|---|---|---|
| 2021 | Powerful Pro Yakyū: Pawafuru Kōkō-hen | Shinobu Mizutori | |

=== Video games ===
| Year | Title | Role | Ref. |
|---|---|---|---|
| 2017 | Hoshi no Rebellion | Toshiie Maeda, Charlemagne | |
| 2018 | A3! | Keita Yano, baseball club member, amusement park zombie, undead | |
| 2018 | Fight League | Tsukasa Nekoma | |
| 2018 | Sensual Phrase | Hokuto Hiiragi | |
| 2019 | Monster Strike | Aporon | |
| 2019 | Sensual Phrase Climax | Hokuto Hiiragi | |
| TBA | Futsal Boys!!!!! | Ryosuke Minase | |
