= High Strung (2016 film) =

2016 American drama film

- Theatrical release poster
- Directed by: Michael Damian
- Written by: Janeen Damian; Michael Damian
- Produced by: Janeen Damian; Michael Damian
- Starring: Keenan Kampa; Nicholas Galitzine; Paul Freeman; Jane Seymour
- Cinematography: Viorel Sergovici
- Edited by: Peter CabadaHagan; Janeen Damian; Michael Damian; Byron Speight
- Music by: Nathan Lanier
- Production companies: Riviera Films; Sforzando Productions; Castel Film Studio
- Distributed by: Paladin
- Release dates: February 6, 2016 (SBIFF); April 8, 2016 (United States)
- Running time: 96 minutes
- Country: United States
- Language: English
- Box office: $53,447

High Strung is a 2016 American drama film directed by Michael Damian and written by Janeen Damian and Michael Damian. The film stars Keenan Kampa, Nicholas Galitzine, Jane Seymour, Sonoya Mizuno, Richard Southgate, and Paul Freeman. The film was released on April 8, 2016, by Paladin. A sequel High Strung: Free Dance was released in 2019.

== Plot ==
Ruby, a classical ballet dancer, earns a scholarship to the prestigious Manhattan Conservatory of the Arts. There, she befriends her roommate Jasmine (nicknamed "Jazzy") and catches the interest of a violinist, Kyle Endeca. With no formal training in contemporary dance, Ruby struggles with the lessons, especially in comparison to the top dancer of her class, April.

Ruby meets a struggling and moody British violinist named Johnnie, who performs in the New York City Subway for money. While watching him play, two hip-hop groups start a dance-off before the police arrives to break them up. In the chaos, Ruby gets pushed and falls down. Johnnie gets distracted while helping her, and his violin and the money he earned busking are stolen. While helping Johnnie track down his stolen violin, Ruby learns he is illegally living in the United States, which is why he is unable to file a police report. The next day, Ruby rents a loaner violin from the Conservatory and suggests to Johnnie that he should enter a competition where a dancer performs with a string musician, with the winner receiving a scholarship at the Conservatory, which could qualify Johnnie for a student visa, and $25,000. Not wanting to accept charity, Johnnie coldly brushes the idea off and rejects the violin.

During a night at a pub, Kyle invites Ruby to attend a gala in which he will be performing and Jazzy enters a relationship with a man. Behind on his rent, Johnnie agrees to a job as a waiter alongside the Switch Steps, a hip-hop group who lives in his building, at the gala. Ruby encounters Johnnie, who apologies for his cold behavior, and the two share a dance. Kyle, jealous of the attraction between them, insults Johnnie for being a street performer, resulting in the two competing against each other with the violin. The Switch Steps assist Johnnie by dancing for the crowd before they are chased out by security. Johnnie later visits Ruby at the Conservatory and the two begin a romantic relationship. Johnnie also agrees to enter the competition with Ruby, who later learns from Kyle that he and April are also entering as a team.

As Ruby continues to struggle in her contemporary classes and Jazzy is repeatedly late for her classes due to partying late with her boyfriend, they are warned that they risk expulsion. After an argument, Ruby and Jazzy reaffirm their friendship and Jazzy starts to improve her habits. With the help of the Switch Steps, Ruby and Johnnie begin to rehearse for the competition.

On the day of the competition, Ruby receives a call from a consignment store that they had received Johnnie's violin and goes to retrieve it. Meanwhile, Johnnie is taken in by the police for his illegal immigration status. He strikes an agreement with the police to assist them in finding a fraud immigration attorney who Johnnie had paid previously to help him get a green card, nearly causing him to be late to the competition. Ruby returns Johnnie's violin to him for him to play in their performance. As the group performs a piece that mixes classical ballet with hip-hop, the judges express mixed feelings about the non-classical performance. At the end, Ruby, Johnnie, and the Switch Steps are declared the winners.

== Cast ==
- Keenan Kampa as Ruby, a ballet dancer who attends the MCA on a scholarship.
- Nicholas Galitzine as Johnnie Blackwell, a struggling British violinist living illegally in the United States.
- Jane Seymour as Oksana, the strict contemporary dance teacher at MCA. Oksana is the mother of Barlow, the lead protagonist of the sequel film High Strung Free Dance.
- Sonoya Mizuno as Jasmine (nicknamed "Jazzy"), Ruby's roommate and fellow dancer at the MCA.
- Richard Southgate as Kyle, a violinist at MCA who has a crush on Ruby and sees Johnnie as a rival.
- Paul Freeman as Kramrovsky, the ballet teacher at MCA who teaches Ruby that imperfection drives perseverance and talent.
- Maia Morgenstern as Markova
- Ian Eastwood as Rik
- Anabel Kutay as April, one of the best dancers at the MCA who dislikes Ruby.
- Marcus Emanuel Mitchell as Hayward Jones III
- Comfort Fedoke as PopTart
- Simon A. Mendoza as Ollie
- Miranda Wilson as Mary
- Dave Scott as Macki
- Andrew Pleavin as Slater
- Tomi May as Detective Mullen
- David Lipper as Sam
- Nigel Barber as Mr. Peterson

== Release ==
The film premiered at the Santa Barbara International Film Festival on February 6, 2016. The film was released on April 8, 2016, by Paladin.

Songs featured in the film include "DJ Fav" by singer/actress Nia Sioux.

== Reception ==
On Rotten Tomatoes, the film has a score of 75% based on reviews from 8 critics.

== Sequel ==
A sequel, High Strung Free Dance (also known as Free Dance 2), was released theatrically in October 2019, and on Netflix on May 31, 2020. Jane Seymour is the only cast member from High Strung to return for the sequel, which stars Harry Jarvis, Juliet Doherty, and Thomas Doherty.
