= Keenan Kampa =

American actress and dancer

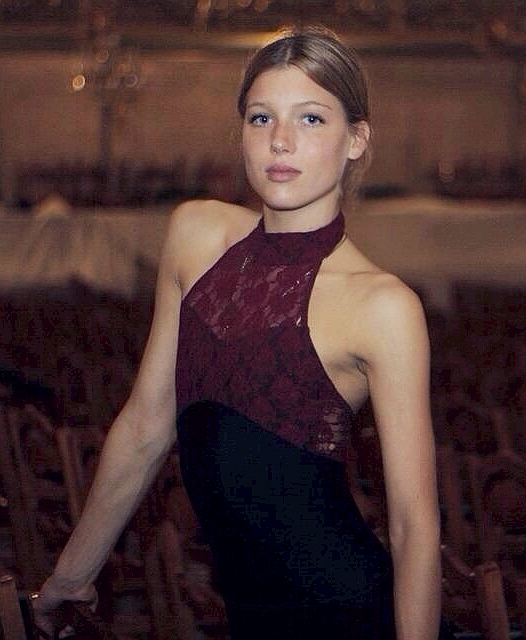
- Kampa in 2014
- Born: February 3, 1989 (age 37); United States
- Occupations: Actress and dancer

Keenan Kampa (born February 3, 1989) is an American actress and dancer.

== Career ==
Kampa started dancing at the age of four. She studied at the Conservatory Ballet in Reston. Kampa was raised near Reston, Virginia From 2003 to 2004, she was part of the Boston Ballet's Summer Dance Program.

In 2005 and 2006 she participated in the American Ballet Theater's summer intensive program on a scholarship.

She entered the National Youth Ballet Competition in 2006 and won a gold medal.

In 2007, when she was 18 years old, she was invited to study at the Vaganova Ballet Academy in St. Petersburg, Russia, the second American to be admitted to the academy after Ryan Martin. After three years, she graduated at the top of her class and with a Russian diploma. She accepted a contract with the Boston Ballet and, after two seasons, she was invited to dance with the Mariinsky Theatre, becoming the first American in history to do so. She returned to the United States in 2014 for hip surgery. She planned to return to Russia, but decided to remain in the United States.

== Filmography ==
- Swan Lake 3D – Live from the Mariinsky Theatre (2013)
- Jerome Lejeune – To the least of these my brothers & sisters (documentary) (2015)
- The Jimmy Star Show with Ron Russell (TV Series) (2016)
- New York Academy (2016)
- High Strung (2016)

== Accolades ==
- 2006 – National Youth Ballet Competition, gold medal
- 2012 – Dance Magazine's "25 to Watch"
