= The Transfer Destination Was a World with few Pharmacists =

Japanese light novel series

- First light novel volume cover

転移先は薬師が少ない世界でした (Tenisaki wa Kusushi ga Sukunai Sekaideshita)
- Genre: Isekai; Medical
- Novel series
- Written by: Toutetsu
- Published by: AlphaPolis
- Original run: August 26, 2018 – present
- Light novel
- Written by: Toutetsu
- Illustrated by: Mo
- Published by: AlphaPolis
- Imprint: Regina Books
- Original run: May 7, 2019 – present
- Volumes: 8
- Manga
- Written by: Toutetsu
- Illustrated by: Haruo Natsuno
- Published by: AlphaPolis
- English publisher: NA: Alpha Manga
- Imprint: Regina Comics
- Magazine: Regina
- Original run: December 17, 2020 – present
- Volumes: 7

The Transfer Destination Was a World with few Pharmacists (転移先は薬師が少ない世界でした, Tenisaki wa Kusushi ga Sukunai Sekaideshita) is a Japanese light novel series written by Toutetsu and illustrated by Mo. It began serialization as a web novel published on AlphaPolis' website in August 2018. It later began publication under AlphaPolis' Regina Books imprint in May 2019. A manga adaptation illustrated by Haruo Natsuno began serialization AlphaPolis' Regina manga website in December 2020.

== Plot ==
The series follows Yui Suzuhara, an office worker who recently lost her job due to her company's bankruptcy. She finds herself transported to another world and unable to return to Japan. Stuck in an unfamiliar world as the half-demon Rin, she decides to become a pharmacist, providing potions to the people she encounters, while also becoming involved with various intrigues.

== Media ==
=== Light novel ===
Written by Toutetsu, The Transfer Destination Was a World with few Pharmacists began serialization as a web novel published on AlphaPolis' website on August 26, 2018. It later began publication with illustrations by Mo under AlphaPolis' Regina Books light novel imprint on May 7, 2019. Eight volumes have been released as of December 31, 2022.

No.	Release date	ISBN
1	May 7, 2019	978-4-434-25916-6
2	October 5, 2019	978-4-434-26509-9
3	April 5, 2020	978-4-434-27249-3
4	November 5, 2020	978-4-434-28018-4
5	March 31, 2021	978-4-434-28684-1
6	December 31, 2021	978-4-434-29754-0
7	June 5, 2022	978-4-434-30350-0
8	December 31, 2022	978-4-434-31424-7

=== Manga ===
A manga adaptation illustrated by Haruo Natsuno began serialization on AlphaPolis' Regina manga website on December 17, 2020. The manga's chapters have been compiled into seven tankōbon volumes as of August 2026.

The manga's chapters are published in English on AlphaPolis' Alpha Manga service.

No.	Original release date	Original ISBN	North American release date	North American ISBN
1	September 5, 2021	978-4-434-29287-3	July 25, 2025	—
2	August 5, 2022	978-4-434-30589-4	July 25, 2025	—
3	April 5, 2023	978-4-434-31777-4	July 25, 2025	—
4	February 5, 2024	978-4-434-33349-1	November 28, 2025	—
5	November 5, 2024	978-4-434-34712-2	May 29, 2026	—
6	September 5, 2025	978-4-434-36304-7	October 23, 2026	—
7	August 5, 2026	978-4-434-38159-1	—	—

== Reception ==
By August 2026, the series had over 1.4 million copies in circulation.

The series won the Special Award at the eleventh Alphapolis Fantasy Novel Awards in 2018.

The manga adaptation, alongside The Villainess and the Demon Knight, won the Isekai Comic Prize at NTT Solmare's Digital Comic Awards in 2024.
