= List of Kirakira PreCure a la Mode characters =

This is a list of characters in Kirakira PreCure a la Mode, a 2017 Japanese magical girl anime series produced by Asahi Broadcasting Corporation, Toei Animation, and the fourteenth installment in Izumi Todo's Pretty Cure metaseries.

== Main characters ==
=== Pretty Cures ===
Ichika Usami (宇佐美 いちか, Usami Ichika) / Cure Whip (キュアホイップ, Kyua Hoippu)
Voiced by: Karen Miyama
The main protagonist of the series. Ichika is a confident 13-year-old girl and a second year student at Ichigozaka Middle School. Very cheerful and energetic like the rabbit, she loves sweets and desserts and wishes to become a pastry chef, but struggles with baking them. Usami's mother works overseas as a doctor, and her father, who runs a dojo, is taking care of Usami until her mother returns home. Though Usami's baking skills are not perfect, her passion for it fuels her resolve, allowing her to become a Pretty Cure. As Cure Whip, she has enhanced hearing and can jump like a rabbit. Usami can also use Kirakiraru to create a pink cream lasso to attack or grapple enemies, and later gains the ability to use the Candy Rod to perform a new attack, Whip Decoration. She is the Pretty Cure of energy and smiles, and has a rabbit and strawberry shortcake motif. Her Animal Sweet is the Rabbit Shortcake, and her theme color is pink. She introduces herself by saying "With energy and smiles! Let's・la・mix it all up! Cure Whip! Ready to serve!" (元気と笑顔を！レッツ・ラ・まぜまぜ！キュアホイップ！できあがり！, Genki to egao o! Rettsu・Ra・Mazemaze! Kyua Hoippu! Dekiagari!). In the epilogue, she is shown to be traveling around the world with the Kirakira Patisserie to make others smile.
She issued a greeting to the Japanese chapter of Médecins Sans Frontières in November 2017.
Himari Arisugawa (有栖川 ひまり, Arisugawa Himari) / Cure Custard (キュアカスタード, Kyua Kasutādo)
Voiced by: Haruka Fukuhara
A 14-year-old girl and a second-year middle school student at Ichigozaka Middle School and Ichika's classmate, who is hardworking and knowledgeable, but shy, and is known for being fast and light like a squirrel. She is knowledgeable about sweets and pastries and is known as the "Sweets Professor". As Cure Custard, she has the ability to run fast like a squirrel and attack with lightning, and later gains the ability to use the Candy Rod to perform a new attack, Custard Illusion. She is the Pretty Cure of intelligence and courage and has a squirrel and pudding motif. Her Animal Sweet is the Squirrel Pudding, and her theme color is yellow. She introduces herself by saying "With intelligence and courage! Let's・la・mix it all up! Cure Custard! Ready to serve!" (知性と勇気を！レッツ・ラ・まぜまぜ！キュアカスタード！できあがり！, Chisei to Yūki o! Rettsu・Ra・Mazemaze! Kyua Kasutādo! Dekiagari!). In the epilogue, she is shown to have become a scientist on sweets and working with other scientists to create a large pudding.
Aoi Tategami (立神 あおい, Tategami Aoi) / Cure Gelato (キュアジェラート, Kyua Jerāto)
Voiced by: Tomo Muranaka
A 14-year-old girl who is a second-year middle school student at Ichigozaka Middle School and Ichika's classmate. She is known for being enthusiastic and brave like a lion. She loves to sing and is the lead vocalist of Wild Azur, a rock band. When managing the Patisserie, her strength and support come in handy. It is later revealed that she is an heiress to the Tategami family's immense wealth, but she wants to follow her dream of being a rock star instead. As Cure Gelato, she is the Pretty Cure of freedom and passion and has a lion and ice cream motif. Her lion abilities allow her to use ice powers to freeze the enemy, as well as attack by roaring. In episode 14, she gains the ability to use the Candy Rod to perform a new attack, Gelato Shake. Her Animal Sweet is the Lion Ice Cream, and her theme color is blue. She introduces herself by saying "With freedom and passion! Let's・la・mix it all up! Cure Gelato! Ready to serve!" (自由と情熱を！レッツ・ラ・まぜまぜ！キュアジェラート！できあがり！, Jiyū to Jōnetsu o! Rettsu・Ra・Mazemaze! Kyua Jerāto! Dekiagari!). In the epilogue, she is shown to have become a world-famous singer.
Yukari Kotozume (琴爪 ゆかり, Kotozume Yukari) / Cure Macaron (キュアマカロン, Kyua Makaron)
Voiced by: Saki Fujita
A 17-year-old girl and second-year high school student at Ichigo Field High School, who has a beauty, nobility as well as being selfish and arrogant like a cat. While she is initially aloof, with the group's support, she starts to enjoy her job and life more. As Cure Macaron, she has enhanced reflexes like a cat and the ability to attack with her claws, and later gains the ability to use the Candy Rod to perform a new attack, Macaron Julienne. She is the Pretty Cure of beauty and excitement and has a cat and macaron motif, with design elements from "Musumeyaku (娘役; "Daughter's Role") actresses of Takarazuka Revue. Her Animal Sweet is the Cat Macaron and her theme color is purple. She introduces herself by saying "With beauty and excitement! Let's・la・mix it all up! Cure Macaron! Ready to serve!" (美しさとときめきを！レッツ・ラ・まぜまぜ！キュアマカロン！できあがり！, Utsukushisa to Tokimeki o! Rettsu・Ra・Mazemaze! Kyua Makaron! Dekiagari!). In the epilogue, she is shown to be traveling around the world.
Akira Kenjou (剣城 あきら, Kenjō Akira) / Cure Chocolat (キュアショコラ, Kyua Shokora)
Voiced by: Nanako Mori
A 17-year-old girl and second-year high school student at Ichigo Field High School, who has a boyish appearance and she is kind, gentle, and having a strong sense of justice like a dog. Akira is protective of her younger sister Miku who has a serious illness, and has moved to Ichika's neighborhood to be closer to the hospital where Miku resides. As Cure Chocolat, she has an enhanced sense of smell like a dog, and later gains the ability to use the Candy Rod to perform a new attack, Chocolate Aromase, as well as wield a sword made of chocolate. She is the Pretty Cure of strength and love and has a dog and chocolate motif, with design elements from "Otokoyaku (男役; "Male Role") actresses of Takarazuka Revue. Her Animal Sweet is the Dog Chocolate, and her theme color is red. She introduces herself by saying "With strength and love! Let's・la・mix it all up! Cure Chocolat! Ready to serve!" (強さと愛を！レッツ・ラ・まぜまぜ！キュアショコラ！できあがり！, Tsuyosa to Ai o! Rettsu・Ra・Mazemaze! Kyua Shokora! Dekiagari!). In the epilogue, she is shown studying to become a nurse.
Kirarin (キラリン, Kirarin) / Ciel Kirahoshi (キラ星 シエル, Kirahoshi Shieru) / Cure Parfait (キュアパルフェ, Kyua Parufe)
Voiced by: Inori Minase
A rabbit-like fairy who has the ability to transform into a human, and a student at Ichigozaka Middle School. She became known as the Genius Patissiere after studying in France, and has recently returned to Japan for a demonstration. It is later revealed that she is Pikario's older twin sister, who gained the ability to transform into a human after studying baking for some time but reverts to her fairy form when hungry. As Cure Parfait, she wields the Rainbow Ribbon, which she uses to perform the attacks Parfait Etoile and Un・Deux・Très Bien! Kiracle・Rainbow!. She is the Pretty Cure of dreams and hope and has a pegasus and parfait motif. Her Animal Sweet is the Pegasus Parfait and her theme colors are green and rainbow. She introduces herself by saying "With dreams and hope! Let's・la・mix it all up! Cure Parfait! Ready to serve!" (夢と希望を！レッツ・ラ・まぜまぜ！キュアパルフェ！できあがり！, Yume to Kibō o! Rettsu・Ra・Mazemaze! Kyua Parufe! Dekiagari!). In the epilogue, she is shown to have opened her own patisserie alongside Pikario.

=== Fairies ===
Pekorin (ペコリン) / Cure Pekorin (キュアペコリン, Kyua Pekorin)
Voiced by: Mika Kanai
A chubby and spoiled puppy-like fairy who loves sweets and resides at Mount Ichigo. The color of her ears changes based on her emotions, becoming pink when she is happy and blue when she is sad. Later on in the series, she gains the ability to turn into a human, and during the final battle, after the Cures are drained of their Kirakiraru, she becomes a Cure herself after obtaining her own Sweets Pact and Animal Sweet. As Cure Pekorin, she attacks by firing cream-like projectiles using the Candy Rod, which then explode. She is the Pretty Cure of taste and sparkles and has a lamb and doughnuts motif. Her Animal Sweet is the Pekorin Doughnut and her theme color is pink. She introduces herself by saying "With hunger and sparkles! Let's・la・mix it all up! Cure Pekorin! Ready to serve!" (ペコペコとキラキラを！レッツ・ラ・まぜまぜ！キュアペコリン！できあがり！, Pekopeko to Kirakira wo! Rettsu・Ra・Mazemaze! Kyua Pekorin! Dekiagari!). In the epilogue, she is shown to have opened the Peko Patisserie and to be running it alongside Elder.
Elder (長老, Chōrō)
Voiced by: Yū Mizushima
An elderly goat-like fairy who resides at Mount Ichigo and became a spirit following the explosion there. He entrusts the Cures with protecting Kirakiraru and running the Kirakira Patisserie. He can also assume a human form who resembles an elderly man and acts as the Patisserie's owner.
Yapapa (ヤパパ), Poponun (ポポヌン), Mahanya (マハニャ) & Danidani (ダニーダニ, Danīdanī)
Voiced by: Rie Hikisaka, Momo Ishibashi, Shin Matsushige & Miina Obata
Fairies who live on Mount Ichigo and admire the Pretty Cures. They were scattered following the explosion at Mount Ichigo, but are reunited thanks to the Elder's efforts.

== Antagonists ==
Noir (ノワール, Nowāru)
Voiced by: Yoku Shioya, Minori Suzuki (reincarnated)
The main antagonist of the series. A century prior to the events of the series, Noir met Lumière and demanded that she bake only for him, as he was unable to make sweets. When she refused, wanting to make sweets for everyone, he vowed to cover Ichigozaka in darkness. Noir has the power to stain the Kirakiraru of a person's heart and turn them into objects used to take others' Kirakiraru. Elysio was born when Noir infused his body with the Kirakiraru from Lumière's cupcake, when he possessed to confront the Cures. However, after Noir's past is revealed, Elysio betrays him and reveals his true plans, turning him and Lumière into cards, but Noir is later freed. In the finale, Ichika encounters a boy who appears to be Noir's reincarnation.
Elysio (エリシオ, Erishio)
Voiced by: Daisuke Hirakawa
The secondary antagonist of the series, who later usurps Noir as the main antagonist. He is a charismatic and nihilistic man who serves as Noir's vessel, having been born when Noir infused his body with the Kirakiraru from Lumière's cupcake, and considers himself to be a hollow shell. He carries tarot cards which he uses in various ways, including absorbing Kirakiraru, making weapons, and as a method of mind control. He also uses them in his Noir Miroir spell to turn an object into a Card Monster (カードモンスター, Kādo Monsutā; voiced by Shunichi Maki). After sealing Glaive and Diable in cards, he uses their power to assume different appearances to fight the Cures. While allowing Noir to possess him to fight the Cures, Elysio deems his motives to be ridiculous and seals him and Lumière in cards, using their powers to turn Ichigozaka into a place devoid of emotion and erasing the Cures' memories and emotions. After the Cures reawaken their power and overwhelm him, Elysio sucks them and the planet into his body as a last resort. However, the Cures reveal to him that he still has a heart and convince him to help them restore the world, after which he relinquishes Noir and Lumière's cards before leaving to see the world.
Kirakiraru Thieves (キラキラルをうばう存在, Kirakiraru o Ubau Sonzai)
A group of ten evil and mischievous fairies who are the initial antagonists of the series. They aim to steal Kirakiraru to gain power and can absorb Kirakiraru from the sweets they target to become a monstrous form, in which their body parts grow and they have a sweets-like appearance. They wear red belts with black star symbols on the buckles which Julio gave to them, which gave them power but also brainwashed them. When defeated, they return to their normal form. Each of their forms has a different voice, and their names are derived from different types of sweets. After being defeated, they apologize for their actions and work to aid the fairies of Mount Ichigo.

Gummy (ガミー, Gamī; voiced by Yūji Ueda) is a temperamental dark purple lizard-like fairy who is the leader of the Kirakiraru Thieves. When the Thieves attack the sweets festival and Julio fuses them into a stronger form, they overpower the Cures until the Cures gain the power of the Candy Rods, allowing them to defeat the Thieves and free them from Julio's influence. The group later apologizes for their actions and work to aid the fairies of Mount Ichigo.
Pulupulu (プルプル, Purupuru; voiced by Taketora) is a cunning yellow frog-like fairy who targets the Kirakiraru in puddings. He nearly defeats Cure Whip before Himari becomes Cure Custard and helps her to defeat him. His body part in his larger form is made of pudding.
Hot (ホットー, Hottō; voiced by Atsushi Imaruoka) is a hot-blooded yet cool-headed red weasel-like fairy who targets the Kirakiraru in ice cream. He battles Cure Whip and Cure Custard until Aoi becomes Cure Gelato and helps them defeat him. His body part in his larger form is made of ice cream.
Choucrea (シュックリー, Shukkurī; voiced by Taketora) is a lazy and greedy black duck-like fairy who targets the Kirakiraru in cream puffs. He tries to steal the Kirakiraru from the cream puffs the Cures made, but is ultimately defeated through their efforts. In his larger form, his body part is cream puffs and he has the ability to attack by spinning.
Maquillon (マキャロンヌ, Makyaronnu; voiced by Eriko Kawasaki) is a cruel and spoiled green doll-like fairy who wears a necklace and targets the Kirakiraru in macarons. She fights the Cures, but Yukari defeats her after becoming Cure Macaron. In her larger form, her body part is macarons and she can use her tongue to attack.
Bitard (ビタード, Bitādo; voiced by Atsushi Imaruoka) is a stubborn brown pterodactyl-like fairy who targets the Kirakiraru in chocolates. He successfully takes Kirakiraru from Akira's chocolate, but she defeats him after becoming Cure Chocolat. During their second encounter, he easily defeats the other Cures until Akira defeats him. His body part in his larger form is chocolate.
Fueru (フエール, Fuēru; voiced by Taketora) is an outgoing yellow monkey-like fairy who targets the Kirakiraru in doughnuts. He uses his duplication powers against Cure Whip, but is defeated by the combined strength of the Cures. In his larger form, his body part is doughnuts and the floating doughnut he carries becomes reddish.
Spongen (スポンジン, Suponjin; voiced by Atsushi Imaruoka) is a prideful brown noodle-like fairy with a demonic appearance who targets the Kirakiraru in sponge cakes. He takes Kirakiraru from Emiru's cake and nearly defeats the Cures until they unite their strengths to defeat him. His body part in his larger form is sponge cakes, and in this form he can attack using his arms as whips.
Cookacookie (クッカクッキー, Kukkakukkī; voiced by Taketora) is a strong brown dog-like fairy who targets the Kirakiraru in cookies. He targets Tatsumi's Panda Cookie until the Cures intervene and defeat him. In his larger form, his body part is cookies and he has many shapes across his body, such as hearts, stars, diamonds, and circles.
Tarton (タルトーン, Tarutton; voiced by Eriko Kawasaki) is an elegant dark brown mushroom-like fairy who targets the Kirakiraru in tarts. She targets the Hedgehog Fruits Tart until the Cures intervene and defeat her. In her larger form, her body part is tarts and she can attack by spinning.

Pikario (ピカリオ, Pikario) / Rio Kuroki (黒樹 リオ, Kuroki Rio) / Julio (ジュリオ, Jurio)
Voiced by: Junko Minagawa
A rabbit-like fairy who is Kirarin's younger twin brother. He fell into depression because he was unable to match her skills, and as a result, grew to hate sweets. Soon after, Noir took the Kirakiraru from Pikario's heart and transformed him into the human Julio, causing any sweets he made from then on to be stained in darkness. He was responsible for causing the Kirakiraru Thieves to become evil by giving them the belts, and also has the ability to steal Kirakiraru to transform his rod depending on the sweet the Kirakiraru originated from. Julio assumes the identity of transfer student Rio Kuroki to spy on the Cures as Ichika's classmate. He discovers the Cures' identities during their second confrontation, but is exposed after Yukari discovers he has been gathering information about the Cures, though she didn't inform other Cures about him. After stealing Ichika's Kirakiraru, causing her to fall into despair, he transforms his rod into a dark replica of the Candy Rod and nearly defeats the Cures until Ichika recovers and returns to aid them. Together, they break his mask and rod and Cure Whip offers him to come with them, but he refuses and leaves. He later fights the Cures again, during which Kirarin discovers he is her brother, and he is purified and returns to his fairy form. Later on, he sacrifices himself to protect Kirarin from Noir and allow her to complete her parfait and become a Cure. He also gives her his rod, which transforms into the Rainbow Ribbon. He eventually recovers in the shrine and later returns to help the Cures battle Glaive. In the epilogue, he is shown to have opened his own patisserie alongside Kirarin.
Bibury (ビブリー, Biburī)
Voiced by: Chiemi Chiba
A girl who was originally a lonely orphan until Noir recruited her, extracting her Kirakiraru and corrupting it into a Kirakiraru-absorbing doll called Iru (イル; voiced by Shunichi Maki) that she carries with her. After Julio's defeat, Bibury first makes herself known by spreading rumors in an effort to sabotage the Kirakira Patisserie. Iru serves as her enforcer after absorbing enough Kirakiraru to increase in size, and Bibury becomes able to fuse with it to increase its power. When Bibury confronts the Cures to in a final attempt to redeem herself, she is sent back in time with them to Ichigozaka's past and learns that Noir engineered her solitude to recruit her. Iru then forcefully absorbs a conflicted Bibury to attack the Cures, who defeat it and cause it to dissolve back into Kirakiraru. Bibury later begins working at Kirarin's patisserie and occasionally supports the Cures.
Glaive (グレイブ, Gureibu)
Voiced by: Hisao Egawa
A fierce and power-hungry man who owns a purple car that can absorb Kirakiraru. He was once a human who worked as a businessman and would fight others to gain money and power. Soon, people started to hate him and he met Noir, who accepted him as his own. He has the ability to create clay doll minions called Nendo Monsters (ネンドモンスター, Nendo Monsutā; voiced by Shunichi Maki) which he can turn into monsters using the Kirakiraru that his car absorbs. He later absorbs Diable's essence into his car, transforming it into a stronger model called Diable Custom (ディアブル カスタム, Diaburu Kasutamu). He then attacks Ichigozaka by transforming its residents into Nendos, later merging with his car to fight the Cures until they defeat him using the Sweets Castle's power, after which Elysio turns him into a card. He is revived after Elysio turns Ichigozaka into his domain, now wearing military garb and being tasked with eliminating any Kirakiraru that manifests to maintain Elysio's ideal order and prevent the Cures from regaining their memories. However, after Pekorin becomes Cure Pekorin, she defeats him and restores the Cures' memories.
Diable (ディアブル, Diaburu)
Voiced by: Ryōta Takeuchi
A wolf-like spirit who was an old ally of Noir before Lumière defeated him, and now seeks to gather enough Kirakiraru to fully revive himself. He assumes his true form and battles the Cures, but is defeated and absorbed into Glaive's car. After Glaive's defeat, Elysio turns Diable's essence into a card. In the finale, Ichika encounters a puppy who appears to be his reincarnation.

== Cures' families ==
Genichiro Usami (宇佐美 源一郎, Usami Genichirō)
Voiced by: Kenjiro Tsuda
Ichika's father, who runs a family-owned dojo. He is skilled at martial arts and knows his daughter's feelings well.
Satomi Usami (宇佐美 さとみ, Usami Satomi)
Voiced by: Yuriko Yamaguchi
Ichika's mother, who works as a doctor overseas but often returns home to Japan to give Ichika sweets that she bought.
Raiou Tategami (立神雷桜, Tategami Raiō)
Voiced by: Tetsuo Komura
Aoi's father, and the president of the Tategami Konzern. Tategami expects Aoi to respect his social status and take over the business when she gets older. However, after attending one of Wild Azur's concerts and seeing her dream to pursue a career as a rock singer, he decides to entrust the future of his financial group to Mizushima instead.
Aiko Tategami (立神 藍子, Tategami Aiko)
Voiced by: Eiko Nakamura
Aoi's mother. After attending a Wild Azur concert, she and Raiou agree to entrust the leadership of the family financial group to Mizushima and allow Aoi to be a rock singer.
Shino Kotozume (琴爪 しの, Kotozume Shino)
Voiced by: Yuri Amano
Yukari's grandmother.
Tomi Kenjo (剣城 トミ, Kenjō Tomi)
Voiced by: Kiyoko Miyazawa
Akira's grandmother.
Miku Kenjo (剣城 みく, Kenjō Miku)
Voiced by: Kaede Hondo
Akira's younger sister. She has a weak body and is usually hospitalized.

== Others ==
Lumière (ルミエル, Rumieru) / Cure Lumière (キュアルミエル, Kuya Rumieru)
Voiced by: Kiyono Yasuno
A legendary pâtissier the Cures encounter in the past who is revealed to be an ancient Cure who fought against Noir a century ago. She later grants the Pretty Cure her power in the form of the Kirakiraru Creamer. Elysio later absorbs her and Noir into cards to use their powers, but she is later released. In the finale, Ichika encounters a girl who appears to be her reincarnation.
Junko Mitsuoka (光岡 じゅんこ, Mitsuoka Junko), Risa Kagurazaka (神楽坂 りさ, Kagurazaka Risa), Wataru Izumi (和泉 わたる, Izumi Wataru) & Hiroki Nakano (中野 ひろき, Nakano Hiroki)
Voiced by: Rie Hikisaka (Junko), Ayano Shibuya (Risa), Takaaki Kojima (Wataru), & Makoto Kaneko (Hiroki)
Classmates at Ichigozaka Middle School. Junko is laid-back, Risa is bright and cheery, Wataru is good at sports, and Hiroki is a merry-maker.
Kei Sonobe (園部 けい, Sonobe Kei), Ryuta Yokokawa (横川 りゅうた, Yokokawa Ryūta) & Sara Asaka (浅香 さら, Asaka Sara)
Voiced by: Shunichi Maki (Kei), Masatomo Nakazawa (Ryuta), and Momoko Masayama (Sara)
Schoolmates who are members of Wild Azur.
Ayane Misaki (岬 あやね, Misaki Ayane)
Voiced by: Machico
A rock vocalist of the band Ganache who Aoi admires.
Mariko Himukai (日向 まりこ, Himukai Mariko)
Voiced by: Yukiyo Fujii
The daughter of the shopkeeper of the Sugar sweets shop. She is well known in Ichigozaka's shopping district.
Three Stars Cat (三ツ星にゃんこ, Mitsuboshi Nyanko)
Voiced by: Miina Obata
A cat that frequents the patisserie shops and is said to bring good luck to shops that he visits. He has dark fur with a white chest and three white stars on his forehead. He only allows Yukari to pet him.
Emiru Kodama (児玉 えみる, Kodama Emiru)
Voiced by: Eri Suzuki
An elementary school student from Ichigozaka who is a customer of the Kirakira Patisserie. She has short brown hair and wears a beret.
Daisuke Tatsumi (辰巳 だいすけ, Tatsumi Daisuke)
Voiced by: Junji Majima
A customer of the Kirakira Patisserie who wears a red jacket, a green shirt, blue jeans, and a baseball cap.
Midori Nakamura (中村 みどり, Nakamura Midori)
Voiced by: Akemi Satō
A nursery school teacher at Ichigozaka who has shoulder-length brown hair and wears glasses.
Mitsuyoshi Mizushima (水嶌 みつよし, Mizushima Mitsuyoshi)
Voiced by: Takuya Satō
The chief butler of Tategami Konzern, who is later entrusted with running it.
Saki (さき)
Voiced by: Ayano Shibuya
A little girl who Akira meets during the school festival.
Prince Nata (ナタ王子, Nata Ōji)
Voiced by: Kōsuke Toriumi
A prince from the Duchy of Confeito. He claims to have fallen for Yukari at first sight and sees Akira as a rival for her affection, but is unaware that Akira is actually a girl.
Yuri (ゆり) & Kanako (かなこ)
Voiced by: Yuri Komagata (Yuri) & Kanako Miyamoto (Kanako)
The participants in the audition.
Yuu Tachibana (立花 ゆう, Tachibana Yū)
Voiced by: Ken Uo
The writer of Himari's favourite book.
Solaine (ソレーヌ, Sorēnu)
Voiced by: Ayumi Tsunematsu
The owner of the Mon Tresor pastry shop in Paris, who discovered and valued Kirarin's talent for sweets. After discovering that Kirarin is in Ichigozaka, she seeks to know why she chose to leave behind her reputation in Paris for a small town in the hills. She tries to get her to return to Paris, but eventually accepts that she has made new friends and wishes to continue discovering new things.
Hana Nono (野乃 はな, Nono Hana) / Cure Yell (キュアエール, Kyua Ēru)
Voiced by: Rie Hikisaka
The protagonist of Hug! Pretty Cure.
Hugtan (はぐたん, Hagu-tan)
Voiced by: Konomi Tada
A mysterious baby from Hug! Pretty Cure.

== Movie characters ==
Jean-Pierre Zylberstein (ジャン = ピエール・ジルベルスタイン, Jan-Piēru Jiruberusutain)
Voiced by: Onoe Matsuya II
A pâtissier who taught Kirarin how to make sweets in Paris. He is passionate about making sweets, but something seems to have changed about him.
Cook (クック, Kukku)
Voiced by: Aoi Yuki
The main antagonist of the film. A doll-like fairy who accompanies Jean-Pierre and influences him to seek revenge and create the "Ultimate Sweet" to transform the city into sweets. When the Cures attempt to reason with Jean, Cook fuses herself with the sweets monster, but they defeat her with the Animal Memoir's power. Afterwards, she becomes human and is appointed as Jean's apprentice.
