= The Art of Being a Stepmother =

Japanese light novel series

- First light novel volume cover

継母の心得 (Mamahaha no Kokoroe)
- Genre: Isekai, romantic fantasy
- Novel series
- Written by: Toru
- Published by: AlphaPolis
- Original run: August 1, 2022 – present
- Light novel
- Written by: Toru
- Illustrated by: Nozu
- Published by: AlphaPolis
- Imprint: Regina Books
- Original run: March 5, 2023 – present
- Volumes: 8
- Manga
- Written by: Toru; Mamenosuke Fujimaru
- Illustrated by: Sora Honooki
- Published by: AlphaPolis
- English publisher: NA: Alpha Manga
- Imprint: Regina Comics
- Magazine: Regina
- Original run: April 16, 2024 – present
- Volumes: 3

The Art of Being a Stepmother (継母の心得, Mamahaha no Kokoroe) is a Japanese light novel series written by Toru and illustrated by Nozu. It began serialization as a web novel published on AlphaPolis' website in August 2022. It later began publication under AlphaPolis' Regina Books imprint in March 2023. A manga adaptation illustrated by Sora Honooki and with storyboards by Mamenosuke Fujimaru began serialization on AlphaPolis' website in April 2024.

== Synopsis ==
After passing away from an illness, Misaki Yamazaki is reincarnated as Isabelle Dora Simmons, a character in manga that she used to read in her former life. Misaki who died aged 38, regretted not having children, and hoped that in the next life she would become a mother. As Isabelle, she regains her memories as Misaki just a day before the wedding, and remembers that she was an abusive stepmother to the main protagonist, Noah Kimberly Devine, and that she can't undo her wedding as it is too late. After meeting Noah, she ultimately decides to be a devoted parent, raising her child using her experiences from her previous life.

== Media ==
=== Light novel ===
Written by Toru, The Art of Being a Stepmother began serialization as a web novel published on AlphaPolis' website on August 1, 2022. It later began publication under AlphaPolis' Regina Books light novel imprint on March 5, 2023. Eight volumes have been released as of March 15, 2026.

No.	Release date	ISBN
1	March 5, 2023	978-4-434-31671-5
2	August 5, 2023	978-4-434-32336-2
3	December 31, 2023	978-4-434-33144-2
4	June 5, 2024	978-4-434-33942-4
5	December 5, 2024	978-4-434-34884-6
6	April 5, 2025	978-4-434-35510-3
7	October 10, 2025	978-4-434-36450-1
8	March 15, 2026	978-4-434-37352-7
9	October 5, 2026	978-4-434-38473-8

=== Manga ===
A manga adaptation illustrated by Sora Honooki with storyboards by Mamenosuke Fujimaru began serialization on AlphaPolis' website on April 16, 2024. The manga's chapters have been compiled into three tankōbon volumes as of March 2026. The manga is published in English on AlphaPolis' Alpha Manga website.

No.	Release date	ISBN
1	December 5, 2024	978-4-434-34321-6
2	September 2, 2025	978-4-434-34894-5
3	March 15, 2026	978-4-434-35680-3

== Reception ==
The manga adaptation won the grand prize at the 2025 Renta Manga Awards. The manga adaptation was also ranked sixth in the Nationwide Bookstore Employees' Recommended Comics list of 2026. The manga adaptation also won the grand prize at the 2026 Digital Comic Awards.
