= Re:Monster =

Japanese light novel series and its adaptations

- First light novel volume cover
- Genre: Action; Isekai
- Novel series
- Written by: Kogitsune Kanekiru
- Published by: Shōsetsuka ni Narō
- Original run: May 2011 – 2018
- Manga
- Written by: Kogitsune Kanekiru
- Illustrated by: Yamaada
- Published by: AlphaPolis
- English publisher: NA: Hanashi Media
- Original run: August 7, 2012 – August 3, 2017
- Volumes: 9 + 1 side story + 1 extra
- Manga
- Written by: Kogitsune Kanekiru
- Illustrated by: Haruyoshi Kobayakawa
- Published by: AlphaPolis
- English publisher: NA: Seven Seas Entertainment
- Magazine: AlphaPolis
- Original run: March 2014 – present
- Volumes: 13
- Light novel

Re:Monster: Ankoku Tairiku-hen
- Written by: Kogitsune Kanekiru
- Illustrated by: Naji Yanagida
- Published by: AlphaPolis
- Original run: July 2, 2018 – present
- Volumes: 5
- Anime television series
- Directed by: Takayuki Inagaki
- Written by: Hiroshi Yamaguchi
- Music by: Go Sakabe
- Studio: Studio Deen
- Licensed by: Crunchyroll; SA/SEA: Muse Communication
- Original network: Tokyo MX, BS11, TVh
- Original run: April 5, 2024 – present
- Episodes: 12
- icon

Re:Monster is a Japanese light novel series written by Kogitsune Kanekiru and illustrated by Yamaada. It was serialized online between May 2011 and 2018 on the user-generated novel publishing website Shōsetsuka ni Narō. It was later acquired by AlphaPolis, who have published nine main volumes, a side story volume and an extra volume between August 2012 and August 2017. A manga adaptation with art by Haruyoshi Kobayakawa has been serialized online via AlphaPolis' manga website since March 2014 and has been collected in 13 tankōbon volumes. The light novel is licensed in North America by Hanashi Media, while the manga is licensed by Seven Seas Entertainment. A sequel light novel series written by Kanekiru and illustrated by Naji Yanagida, titled Re:Monster: Ankoku Tairiku-hen, began publication by AlphaPolis in July 2018, with five volumes released so far. An anime television series adaptation produced by Studio Deen aired from April to June 2024. A second season has been announced.

== Plot ==
After being murdered at the hands of a lustful woman, Tomokui Kanata is reincarnated in another world among a tribe of goblins. Although goblins are among the weakest of monsters, Tomokui, named Gobrou by the clan elder, has retained the memories of his human past, as well as his extrasensory power: Absorption. Thanks to this ability, which allows him to absorb the powers of anything he eats, he becomes the strongest of his tribe and both the founder and leader of a legendary mercenary group, Parabellum.

== Characters ==
=== Parabellum ===
The mercenary group founded by Gobrou; they are composed of various races and their respective evolved species. Gobrou tends to recruit survivors and rescuees without any other place to go; beyond professional connections.

Gobrou (ゴブ朗, Goburō)
Voiced by: Takuya Satō (Japanese); Sean Letourneau (English)
Formerly a human named Tomokui Kanata who was stabbed to death by a woman in the heart of a futuristic city, he is reborn as a bald-headed, green-skinned goblin infant and given the name Gobrou. However, he still retains his intelligence (which is greater than that of other goblins) and memories of his past life, as well as the ability to absorb the traits of whatever he eats. He later evolves into a Hobgoblin (possibly the adult form of goblins; they are not only bigger, faster and stronger but also have hair) then into an Ogre before impregnating his wives.
Though Gobrou impregnated his wives around the same time, their births happen at random; with their bodies rapidly adapting to third trimester state. All the births have to be C-sections (done by him, as only Gobrou has the medical knowledge) as they cannot deliver normally.
Gobkichi (ゴブ吉, Gobukichi)
Voiced by: Kenta Hosoda (Japanese); Reagan Murdock (English)
Gobrou's brood brother. Although larger than Gobrou, he defers to Gobrou's intelligence and is a devoted follower. With Gobrou's help, he also evolves into a Hobgoblin. He eventually evolves into a Crimson Ogre, which inconvenienced him due to his big frame being incompatible with his mate E until she became an Earth Lord.
Gobmi (ゴブ美, Gobumi)
Voiced by: Ai Kakuma (Japanese); Kate Bristol (English)
A female goblin. She becomes part of a hunting trio with Gobrou and Gobkuichi and is devoted to Gobrou. Later, she also evolves into a Hobgoblin. She is Gobrou's only wife from the tribe, evolving into a superior vampire species; Gobmi has to wear special glasses to stop her charm from affecting everyone.
Gobe (ゴブ江, Gobue)
Voiced by: Kana Ueda (Japanese); Jill Harris (English)
Otherwise known as "E" or "Earthe" in the anime. She is Gobkichi's mate and works for the tribe's mining team. After Kichi evolved into a Minotaur, the two couldn't be intimate without fear of E getting hurt; this changed when she evolved to a similarly large Earth Lord.
Hobsei (ホブ星, Hobusei)
Voiced by: Aya Yamane (Japanese); Mikaela Krantz (English)
Otherwise known as "Sei", she is from the generation before Gobrou. Sei is partly responsible for Gobrou becoming leader of the tribe; having suggested the duel with Gobkin to avoid civil war. She evolved into a Spell Lord due to her dedication to magic. Sei is Sato's lover.
Hobsato (ホブ里, Hobusato)
Voiced by: Nichika Ōmori (Japanese); Marianne Bray (English)
Otherwise known as "Sato", she is from the generation before Gobrou. She evolved into a Blood Lord thanks to her thirst for battle. Much like Kichi, Sato isn't very bright; though she slightly has more common sense. Sato is Sei's lover.

=== Gobrou's lovers ===
Originally they were abducted by the older goblin generation for producing more children. Gobrou protected them, helping the girls put their skills to work; helping the tribe advance in technology and culture. They fall in love with him for his kindness, but demand "group attention" when they feel jealous just one of them is getting affection.

The Redhead (赤髪ショート, Akagami Shōto)
Voiced by: Mai Kanno (Japanese); Katie Wetch (English)
The Redhead is the fourth of Gobrou's human wives, and the only one who is not a support class. She evolved into a special fighter class Noir Soldat by eating Monster flesh; however, her great power comes at the price of needing to eat said food regularly of she will risk her body deteriorating.
She gives birth 100 days after the Twins.
Her real name is "Rubellia Walline"
The Twins (姉妹さん, Shimai-san)
Voiced by: Hibiku Yamamura (Japanese); Alexis Tipton (English)
They are excellent cooks who help teach the tribe how to make human food; the sisters are also excellent seamstresses. The sisters give birth to Gobrou's first son and daughter respectively. They are the second and third of Gobrou's human wives.
Their real names are Felicia and Alma Timiano.
The Blacksmith (鍛冶師さん, Tan'yashi-san)
Voiced by: Miyuri Shimabukuro (Japanese); Reshel Mae (English)
She is often asked by Gobrou to help craft items and weapons; often inventing things Gobrou had in his old world. The Blacksmith makes upgrades to weaponry thanks to her fascination with spirit stones & is Gobrou's fifth wife.
Her real name is "Emery Furado"
The Alchemist (錬金術師さん, Renkinjutsushi-san)
Voiced by: Hisako Tōjō (Japanese); Molly Searcy (English)
As her profession states, the Alchemist is often tasked by Rou to help craft potions and the like. She was the first of the five to fall for Rou; thanking him with a kiss for saving her from a goblin trying to rape her. She is the only one to birth a human child, unlike the others; though her daughter has a rare skill from birth.
Her real name is "Spinel Fean"

=== Gobrou's children ===
Born to the human lovers of Gobrou, they are raised with love and kindness; being doted on by their parents. Their species tends to be random due to all the monsters Gobrou has absorbed.

Aura (オーロ, Ōro)
Daughter of twin Felica. She is half-ogre, being one of the few hybrids to exist. Unlike her brother/cousin, she is hothead who loves a good fight.
Argento (アルジェント, Arujento)
Son of twin Alma. He is half-ogre, being one the few hybrids to exist. Unlike his sister/cousin, he is polite and thoughtful.
Oniwaka (鬼若)
Son of the Blacksmith Emery. He is an ogre with a kind heart, despite his large frame. He respects his elder siblings and looks up to Kichi as a role model.
Nicola (ニコラ, Nikora)
Daughter of the Alchemist Spinel. She is the only human child, but appears aware despite her age. When her mother is busy, Nicola is often looked after by her siblings.
Rupushi (オプシー, Opushī)
Daughter of the Redhead Rubellia. She is a jewel lord and the child, so far, who has had the longest gap between conception and birth; a full 3 months after her siblings.

=== Others ===
Rubilia (ルービリア, Rūbiria)
Voiced by: Nene Hieda (Japanese); Bryn Apprill (English)
Second Princess of the Sternbuild Kingdom. Naive, but with the inherited ability of telepathy, Rubilia seeks freedom after being under house arrest for years due to her power being so strong. As a result, she is an incredible pain in the butt; constantly bothering others and ignoring safety. She seeks to become queen one day, by using Gobrou's mercenary group as vassals to improve her reputation.

== Media ==
=== Light novels ===
==== Re:Monster ====
No.	Original release date	Original ISBN	English release date	English ISBN
1	August 7, 2012	978-4-434-16934-2	October 30, 2025	978-1-961788-40-4
2	December 13, 2012	978-4-434-17360-8	January 30, 2026	978-1-961788-46-6
3	March 10, 2013	978-4-434-17713-2	April 30, 2026	978-1-961788-53-4
SS	July 13, 2013	978-4-434-18077-4	—	—
4	December 9, 2013	978-4-434-18518-2	July 30, 2026	978-1-961788-74-9
5	August 6, 2014	978-4-434-19508-2	November 29, 2026	978-1-961788-87-9
6	March 7, 2015	978-4-434-20318-3	—	—
7	December 1, 2015	978-4-434-21313-7	—	—
8	August 7, 2016	978-4-434-22240-5	—	—
8.5	March 1, 2017	978-4-434-23011-0	—	—
9	August 3, 2017	978-4-434-23608-2	—	—

==== Re:Monster: Ankoku Tairiku-hen ====
No.	Release date	ISBN
1	July 2, 2018	978-4-434-24799-6
2	May 1, 2019	978-4-434-25891-6
3	July 3, 2020	978-4-434-27525-8
4	March 31, 2024	978-4-434-30333-3
5	September 30, 2025	978-4-434-35648-3

=== Manga ===
A manga adaptation with art by Haruyoshi Kobayakawa has been serialized online via AlphaPolis' manga website since March 2014 and has been collected in 13 tankōbon volumes. The manga is licensed in English by Seven Seas Entertainment.

No.	Original release date	Original ISBN	English release date	English ISBN
1	February 28, 2015	978-4-434-20188-2	November 8, 2016	978-1-626924-12-3
2	December 31, 2015	978-4-434-21293-2	February 14, 2017	978-1-626924-24-6
3	March 31, 2017	978-4-434-23001-1	November 28, 2017	978-1-626924-82-6
4	February 28, 2018	978-4-434-24185-7	April 28, 2020	978-1-626927-10-0
5	January 31, 2019	978-4-434-25447-5	August 25, 2020	978-1-64505-457-3
6	November 30, 2019	978-4-434-26639-3	May 16, 2023	978-1-64827-916-4
7	October 31, 2020	978-4-434-27630-9	October 31, 2023	978-1-64827-314-8
8	September 30, 2021	978-4-434-29406-8	January 23, 2024	978-1-63858-612-8
9	September 30, 2022	978-4-434-30882-6	June 11, 2024	978-1-63858-900-6
10	September 30, 2023	978-4-434-32663-9	April 1, 2025	979-8-89160-268-7
11	March 31, 2024	978-4-434-33612-6	June 10, 2025	979-8-89373-165-1
12	October 31, 2024	978-4-434-34671-2	January 6, 2026	979-8-89561-237-8
13	October 10, 2025	978-4-434-36441-9	June 30, 2026	979-8-89765-356-0
14	July 31, 2026	978-4-434-38144-7	—	—

=== Anime ===
An anime television series adaptation, animated by Studio Deen and produced by Genco, was announced on September 19, 2023. It is directed by Takayuki Inagaki, with Hiroshi Yamaguchi handling series composition, Junichi Takaoka designing the characters, and Go Sakabe composing the music. The series aired from April 5 to June 21, 2024, on Tokyo MX and other networks. (Note: Tokyo MX lists the series premiere on April 4, 2024, at 24:00, which is effectively April 5 at midnight JST) The opening theme song is "Into the Fire", performed by Chansung and AK-69 feat. Changmin, while the ending theme song is "Sadame" (運命; lit. 'Fate'), performed by Everdream. Crunchyroll streamed the series worldwide outside of East Asia. Muse Communication has licensed the series in South and Southeast Asia.

A second season was announced on September 25, 2025.

==== Episodes ====
No.	Title	Directed by	Written by	Storyboarded by	Chief animation directed by	Original release date (Note: Episodes are released on select platforms (such as U-Next and Crunchyroll) three days before their televised airings in Japan)
1	"Re:Born"	Mizuki Kobayashi	Hiroshi Yamaguchi	Takayuki Inagaki	Tokuyuki Matsutake & Hirofumi Morimoto	April 5, 2024
After being stabbed by a female stalker in his native sci-fi universe, a man named Kanata Tomokui is reincarnated in another world as a goblin named Gobrou. Thankfully, his skills from his past life were kept intact, and he now must survive in a completely different world with his skills.
2	"Re:D Bear"	Shunji Yoshida	Hiroshi Yamaguchi	Atsushi Ōtsuki	Tokuyuki Matsutake & Masaki Hinata	April 12, 2024
The older generation returns home, including two females goblins. The males have brought supplies stolen from humans and kidnapped five women (twins, a redhead, Alchemist and Blacksmith). Gobrou defeats the older generation leader to become the undisputed leader of the tribe; assuring the five's safety. The girls begin to trust Gobrou, whom gives them the storage area as their room. A few older generation attempt to rape the girls, resulting in Gobrou beating them to death as an example to the rest of the tribe; no one will dare defy him again. Gobmi and the Redhead begin sharing Gobrou's bed with him. While exploring, Gobrou ends up killing and eating the infamous Red Bear; resulting in his evolution to an Ogre; though he loses his left forearm in the fight.
3	"Re:Use"	Yū Yabuuchi, Hiroshi Maejima & Kayoko Suzuki	Taichi Hashimoto	Katsuyuki Kodera	Takeshi Kusaka, Hirofumi Morimoto, Masaki Hinata & Miyuki Sugawara	April 19, 2024
After scaring everyone with his new looks, Gobrou finds he cannot spar with the others as he is too strong now. The human girls have gotten used to life with Gobrou, making Gobmi jealous that he is considering a harem; the girls don't mind, so long as he loves them equally. Gobe finds a dying artificial carbuncle named Returner, whom asks Gobrou to save her master's treasury from greedy adventurers; its full of legendary items, which her master didn't want humans to have. Gobrou attempts negotiation, but he ends up eating the adventurers and their gear when they prove crude. Returner passes in peace, with Gobrou to eating her gem. Among the treasures is an artificial left hand, which attaches itself to Gobrou's nervous system once put on his stump; giving him a new functioning hand.
4	"Re:Ject"	Hiroyuki Okuno	Hiroshi Yamaguchi	Hiroyuki Fukushima	Hirofumi Morimoto	April 26, 2024
A group of elves rudely demand the goblin/hobgoblin tribe assist them in a war against humans invading their territory; Gobrou eats the men and detains the women. Among new skills he gains, Gobrou gains a slime's ability divide and share senses; which Gobrou uses to make sentries out of his blood and line his lovers' clothes, so he can detect their location. Gobkichi and Gobsei and evolve; Gobkichi an ogre and Gobsei a half-spell lord. Others evolve into hobgoblins with aptitudes for mage and one cleric. The parental generation of goblins cannot keep up with the new ones and tell Gobrou they wish to leave; he gives them a mithril blade as a gift, letting the tribe know anyone is free to leave. Later, Gobrou gains the ability of Monster Tamer, while the Redhead gains the class Noir Solder. Kobolds later seek refuge, due to accidentally breaking into the treasury and triggering an undead swarm; Gobrou gains the ability to summon low undead.
5	"Re:Ady"	Takashi Andō	Hiroshi Yamaguchi	Katsuyuki Kodera	Tokuyuki Matsutake & Masaki Hinata	May 3, 2024
Gobrou saves the elf princess from human abductors, helping her return home; resulting in the elf chief striking a bargain to share intel and resources. After being gifted delicious booze, Gobrou offers a discount on further jobs. Gobmi evolves into a dhampir, looking similar to someone Gobrou knew in his last life. Gobe evolves into a half-earth lord, whole Gobsato evolves into a half bloody lord. With encouragement, Kichi and E become a couple. Gobrou eats insect monsters, gaining the ability to fly and create an exoskeleton. The girls get annoyed when Gobrou shows individual attention again, resulting in another night of passion. Heading off to war, Gobrou names his group Parabellum.
6	"Re:Medy"	Shunji Yoshida	Taichi Hashimoto	Hiroyuki Fukushima	Masaki Hinata & Takeshi Kusaka	May 10, 2024
Parabellum successfully takes out human troops, among whom are good natured warriors Gobrou spares regardless of gender. A knight, fed up with the noble's bigotry, immediately swears loyalty to Gobrou and becomes friends with Kichi and the Redhead; both love battle. Turns out the entire war is due to Sternbild's fatally ill princess, whom her fiancee of the Kalika Empire wishes to cure with elven medicine. Gobrou drinks some, giving his blood the same ability. E accidentally excavated a hot spring, giving Parabellum a proper bath. While training the troops, Gobrou discovers Sato and Kichi are too dumb for advanced tactics.
7	"Re:Sist"	Takeshi Yoshimoto	Hiroshi Yamaguchi	Hiroyuki Fukushima	Hirofumi Morimoto	May 17, 2024
Having spoken to the elf king, they decide to end the conflict with the humans as soon as possible and make their next attack on the next enemy encampment. Ogrou encounters one of the Braves of the kingdom, Phillippo the Bone Bug. After a fierce battle, Phillippo retreats. Deeper in the forest, one of Ogrou's body doubles secretly delivers a message and the cure the humans were seeking for their ailing princess. Parabellum has a memorial for those they lost in battle.
8	"Re:Organization"	Kōsuke Shimotori	Taichi Hashimoto	Iku Suzuki	Tokuyuki Matsutake & Masaki Hinata	May 24, 2024
More of Parabellum's people evolve after the battle and some non-human prisoners are offered a place as provisional members of Parabellum if they decide they want to stick around and not return home. Later, Ogrou encounters the dryad he met before and receives magical produce seeds to begin farming. After brainwashing the human noble prisoners, he sends them home to act as spies around the kingdom. Ogrou also decides that the five women he saved originally should finally go home and then decide whether or not they want to stay with him. Afterward, Parabellum is divided into four groups and they split up to explore the outside world, promising to meet back in the forest later.
9	"Re:Stive"	Takashi Andō & Hiroyuki Okuno	Hiroshi Yamaguchi	Katsuyuki Kodera	Miyuki Sugawara, Masaki Hinata & Takeshi Kusaka	May 31, 2024
Ogrou and his group explore the city the women were originally heading to before they were kidnapped and register at the Adventurer's Guild. Ogrou also begins advertising his mercenary company. His first semi-official job is from a knight to rescue a princess, who officially hires him to escort her back home after being rescued. All the women decide to stay with Ogrou, much to his delight. During the escort, the princess is a royal pain in the beginning, and Ogrou hunts down a jade eagle with the blessing of a god to consume its powers. After yet another fierce battle, wherein he loses his other forearm and his left leg below the knee, he defeats the monster and obtains its extremely rare soul stone--an apparently incredible resource that can craft items worth enough gold to buy a small country.
10	"Re:Fulgent"	Shunji Yoshida	Taichi Hashimoto	Atsushi Ōtsuki	Hirofumi Morimoto	June 7, 2024
After spending the night in a small village, horror sets in the next day as Felicia and Alma's bellies suddenly balloon; they are experiencing delayed rapid pregnancy. Ogrou is forced to feed them his flesh, which he regenerates easily, so the children don't kill the mothers by absorbing their nutrients. Finding a cave for privacy, Ogrou decides the only solution is to perform C-sections, then broadcasts how to perform them back to Seiji and Gobuji for future reference. Felicia has a daughter and Alma has a boy; Ogrou names them Auro and Argento respectively. Gobuji notes the babies are mixed bloods, which are not viewed favorably due to persecution and mentions it might be best to kill them. Ogrou refuses, as he knows Parabellum will be accepting of them. While hunting, Ogrou gets a white stag's crystal antler and give a business card to adventurers he saved from a large beast. Auro and Argento are already walking within a day, being fed some of the antler mashed. Ogrou and Redhead eat some, realizing the stag was a divine beast, and Ogrou evolves into an extinct species known as an Apostle Lord and receives a True Name: Yaten-Doji.
11	"Re:Match"	Takahiro Tanaka	Hiroshi Yamaguchi	Hiroyuki Fukushima	Tokuyuki Matsutake & Masaki Hinata	June 14, 2024
The Alchemist, Spinel, and the Blacksmith, Emery, give birth three days after the Felicia and Alma. Emery has an oni boy Ogrou names Oniwaka, while Spinel has a human girl Ogrou names Nicola after a famous inventor; both receive the mashed antler. While resting in a town, Ogrou advertises Parabellum at the Guild and buys a camera to immortalize precious moments with his children. After losing contact with Kichi, Ogrou heads to the dungeon he was exploring. Turns out Kichi evolved into a Minotaur and lost the pass to identify him as an explorer, needing Ogrou to vouch for him in order to leave. Kichi challenges Ogrou to a rematch, wishing to prove his new strength. E has also evolved into a full Earth Lord. Mi feels sad that she hasn't yet evolved again nor birthed Ogrou's child.
12	"Re:Start"	Taro Kubo	Hiroshi Yamaguchi	Takayuki Inagaki	Hirofumi Morimoto, Masaki Hinata, Miyuki Sugawara & Tokuyuki Matsutake	June 21, 2024
The Princess is returned home safely, and she gives Ogrou a certificate to officiate any future meetings with her. Mi and the Redhead keep sleeping with Ogrou to increase their pregnancy chances. On the way back home, Ogrou has Mi train and level up against his summons, evolving her into a Vampire Noble Variant. When Ogrou's group gets back to Parabellum HQ, the cave has been refurbished into a proper underground facility by the other team leaders. Turns out Mi's evolution triggered a skill that gives skills to all the women Ogrou has slept with, even evolving the Dryad. Gobji passes away from old age at 20 due to his own short lifespan. Ogrou hosts a tournament to cheer everyone up, promising to rearrange the ranking in the company if they prove themselves good enough. Ogrou is contacted by the princess, who wishes to hire him to popularize Parabellum. He takes the job, but narrates that it would end up being a bigger deal than he thought.

== See also ==
- A Playthrough of a Certain Dude's VRMMO Life, another light novel series with the same illustrator
