= 2200-Nen Neko no Kuni Nippon =

Japanese manga series

- First tankōbon volume cover

2200年ねこの国ニッポン
- Genre: Science fiction, slice of life
- Manga
- Written by: Rite Nekoha
- Published by: Daitosha
- Imprint: Daito Comics
- Magazine: Neko Tomo
- Original run: December 16, 2017 – present
- Volumes: 3
- Anime television series
- Studio: Imagica Infos; Imageworks Studio
- Original network: tvk
- Original run: October 7, 2025 – December 16, 2025
- Episodes: 12
- icon

2200-Nen Neko no Kuni Nippon (2200年ねこの国ニッポン; lit. 'Japan, the Land of Cats in the Year 2200') is a Japanese four-panel manga series written and illustrated by Rite Nekoha. It has been serialized in Daitosha's Neko Tomo magazine since December 2017 and has been collected in three tankōbon volumes. A "light anime" television series adaptation produced by Imagica Infos and Imageworks Studio aired from October to December 2025.

== Characters ==
Sora (ソラ)
Voiced by: Azusa Tadokoro
Mugishima-san (麦島さん)
Voiced by: Azusa Aoi
Yume-chan (ユメちゃん)
Voiced by: Miyu Hanasaki
Kinako (きなこ)
Voiced by: Chitose Morinaga
Ai-chan (アイちゃん)
Voiced by: Rie Hikisaka
Mugishima's father (麦島父, Mugishima Chichi)
Voiced by: Yuji Kameyama
Library Committee Member (図書委員, Tosho Iin)
Voiced by: Yū Gotō
Courier (配達員, Haitatsuin)
Voiced by: Kōsuke Nakazawa

== Media ==
=== Manga ===
Written and illustrated by Rite Nekoha, 2200-Nen Neko no Kuni Nippon began serialization in Daitosha's Neko Tomo magazine on December 16, 2017. Its chapters have been collected into three tankōbon volumes as of October 2025.

No.	Japanese release date	Japanese ISBN
1	June 25, 2020	978-4-86495-365-8
2	December 25, 2024	978-4-86495-710-6
3	October 9, 2025	978-4-86495-766-3

=== Anime ===
An anime television series adaptation was announced in the October issue of Neko Tomo released on August 16, 2025. The "light anime" series is produced by Imagica Infos and Imageworks Studio and narrated by Junya Asada, and aired from October 7 to December 16, 2025, within the Neko no Hitai Hodo Wide local information program on tvk. The theme song is "Kohakushoku no Loneliness" (琥珀色のロンリネス) performed by Maika Matsuya.
