= A Playthrough of a Certain Dude's VRMMO Life =

Japanese light novel series and its franchise

- First light novel volume cover

とあるおっさんのVRMMO活動記 (Toaru Ossan no VRMMO Katsudōki)
- Novel series
- Written by: Shiina Howahowa
- Published by: Shōsetsuka ni Narō (January 2013–August 2016); AlphaPolis (August 2016–present)
- Original run: January 2013 – present
- Light novel
- Written by: Shiina Howahowa
- Illustrated by: Yamaada
- Published by: AlphaPolis
- Original run: February 10, 2014 – present
- Volumes: 33
- Manga
- Written by: Shiina Howahowa
- Illustrated by: Shūya Rikudō
- Published by: AlphaPolis
- English publisher: Alpha Manga
- Original run: June 27, 2014 – present
- Volumes: 14
- Anime television series
- Directed by: Yuichi Nakazawa
- Written by: Touko Machida
- Music by: Technoboys Pulcraft Green-Fund
- Studio: Maho Film
- Licensed by: Crunchyroll; SEA: Muse Communication
- Original network: Tokyo MX, BS11, HTB, AT-X
- Original run: October 3, 2023 – December 19, 2023
- Episodes: 12
- icon

A Playthrough of a Certain Dude's VRMMO Life (とあるおっさんのVRMMO活動記, Toaru Ossan no VRMMO Katsudōki) is a Japanese light novel series written by Shiina Howahowa and illustrated by Yamaada. It began serialization online in January 2013 on the user-generated novel publishing website Shōsetsuka ni Narō, and it moved to the AlphaPolis website in August 2016. It was also later acquired by AlphaPolis, who have published 33 volumes since February 2014. A manga adaptation illustrated by Shūya Rikudō began serialization online via AlphaPolis' manga website in June 2014, and has been collected in fourteen tankōbon volumes. The manga is published digitally in English through Alpha Manga. An anime television series adaptation produced by Maho Film aired from October to December 2023.

== Premise ==
A 38-year-old office worker decides to start playing a new virtual reality massively multiplayer online role-playing game (VRMMORPG) as an underpowered character so he can have a leisurely time increasing his character's skills without attracting attention from more dedicated players.

== Characters ==
Earth (アース, Āsu) / Daichi Tanaka (田中 大地, Tanaka Daichi)
Voiced by: Kaito Ishikawa (Earth), Daisuke Namikawa (Daichi)
Fairy Queen (フェアリークィーン, Fearī Kwīn)
Voiced by: Reina Ueda
Zwei (ツヴァイ, Tsuvai)
Voiced by: Tasuku Hatanaka
Milly (ミリー, Mirī)
Voiced by: Miho Okasaki
Ryū-chan (龍ちゃん)
Voiced by: Shiori Izawa
Pikasha (ピカーシャ, Pikāsha)
Voiced by: Chitose Morinaga
Nora (ノーラ, Nōra)
Voiced by: Ayaka Asai
Reiji (レイジ)
Voiced by: Tarō Kiuchi
Kazamine (カザミネ)
Voiced by: Yusuke Shirai
Rona (ロナ)
Voiced by: Naomi Ōzora
Ward (ウォード, Wōdo)
Voiced by: Hiroyuki Yoshino
Myun (ミュン)
Voiced by: Mutsumi Kaneko
Grad
Voiced by: Junichi Suwabe
Black (ブラック, Burakku)
Voiced by: Shigeru Chiba
Skeleton Knight (スケルトンナイト, Sukeruton'naito)
Voiced by: Satoshi Hino
Elizabeth (エリザヴェート, Erizabēto)
Voiced by: Rina Hidaka
Zephana (ゼファーナ, Zefāna)
Voiced by: Saho Shirasu
Zetan (ゼタン)
Voiced by: Rikiya Koyama
Ulna (ウールナ, Uruna)
Voiced by: Yurika Kubo
Karen (カレン)
Voiced by: Ayako Kawasumi
Mina (ミーナ)
Voiced by: Asami Seto
Natalnia (ナタルニア, Natarunia)
Voiced by: Hina Kino
Igraon (イグラオン, Iguraon)
Voiced by: Hōchū Ōtsuka

== Media ==
=== Light novel ===
No.	Release date	ISBN
1	February 10, 2014	978-4-43-418839-8
2	June 4, 2014	978-4-43-419309-5
3	September 9, 2014	978-4-43-419602-7
4	December 28, 2014	978-4-43-420138-7
5	March 31, 2015	978-4-43-420448-7
6	July 4, 2015	978-4-43-420760-0
7	October 4, 2015	978-4-43-421059-4
8	March 1, 2016	978-4-43-421681-7
9	June 5, 2016	978-4-43-421997-9
10	October 3, 2016	978-4-43-422427-0
11	December 30, 2016	978-4-43-422805-6
12	May 3, 2017	978-4-43-423235-0
13	October 5, 2017	978-4-43-423774-4
14	December 30, 2017	978-4-43-424119-2
15	April 1, 2018	978-4-43-424459-9
16	September 2, 2018	978-4-43-425054-5
17	December 3, 2018	978-4-43-425389-8
18	April 3, 2019	978-4-43-425790-2
19	September 2, 2019	978-4-43-426413-9
20	December 3, 2019	978-4-43-426781-9
21	April 30, 2020	978-4-43-427332-2
22	November 28, 2020	978-4-43-428005-4
23	March 31, 2021	978-4-43-428662-9
24	October 31, 2021	978-4-43-429119-7
25	March 1, 2022	978-4-43-429992-6
26	September 5, 2022	978-4-43-430569-6
27	March 1, 2023	978-4-43-431647-0
28	September 30, 2023	978-4-43-432653-0
29	December 31, 2023	978-4-43-433106-0
30	August 30, 2024	978-4-43-434359-9
31	February 28, 2025	978-4-43-435350-5
32	August 30, 2025	978-4-43-436283-5
33	February 28, 2026	978-4-43-437308-4

=== Manga ===
No.	Original release date	Original ISBN	North American release date	North American ISBN
1	May 31, 2015	978-4-43-420480-7	September 29, 2023	—
2	March 31, 2016	978-4-43-421653-4	September 29, 2023	—
3	February 28, 2017	978-4-43-422885-8	September 29, 2023	—
4	November 30, 2017	978-4-43-423867-3	October 27, 2023	—
5	September 30, 2018	978-4-43-425008-8	October 27, 2023	—
6	July 31, 2019	978-4-43-426172-5	October 27, 2023	—
7	July 31, 2020	978-4-43-427628-6	December 22, 2023	—
8	March 31, 2021	978-4-43-428669-8	December 22, 2023	—
9	December 31, 2021	978-4-43-429736-6	August 23, 2024	—
10	February 28, 2023	978-4-43-431658-6	December 20, 2024	—
11	September 30, 2023	978-4-43-432665-3	June 20, 2025	—
12	June 30, 2024	978-4-43-434053-6	–	—
13	March 31, 2025	978-4-43-435479-3	–	—
14	January 31, 2026	978-4-43-437189-9	–	—

=== Anime ===
An anime television series adaptation was announced on February 10, 2023. The series is produced by Maho Film and directed by Yuichi Nakazawa, with Touko Machida handling series composition, Yūko Watabe and Yūko Oba designing the main characters, and Technoboys Pulcraft Green-Fund composing the music. It was premiered at the filmstudio in Babelsberg, Germany, where the first two episode were shown. It aired from October 3 to December 19, 2023, on Tokyo MX and other networks. Saji performed the opening theme song "Magic Writer", while Miho Okasaki performed the ending theme song "Kibō no Recipe" (キボウノレシピ; "Recipe of Hope"). Muse Communication licensed the series in Southeast Asia. Crunchyroll streamed the series outside of Asia.

No.	Title	Directed by	Written by	Storyboarded by	Original release date
1	"Earth Logs In"; Transliteration: "Āsu, Rogu In Suru" (Japanese: アース、ログインする)	Yuichi Nakazawa	Touko Machida	Yuichi Nakazawa; Takeshi Mori	October 3, 2023
An average salary man decides to play a new VRMMO game because his only outlet every two to three hours a day is with video games. He logs in with the name Earth and decides to make a very basic character with underpowered skills such as cooking, medicine, bow, sneak, and wind magic. He is bullied for having a bow as they are seen as worthless in the game. He slowly levels up all his basic fighting skills, but has to go to medicinal herb picking because the area is overpopulated with players. He's able to level up his basic medicine skills and then goes back out to hunt monsters. He defeats one and meets to other players that add him as a friend. Upset with the lack of flavor of the food sold by NPCs, Earth begins to work on his cooking ability. Eventually his food is rated up to a 7 and he gets other players that are willing to buy his food, which makes his cooking skill go up quickly. Earth begins to work on his combo skill of sneak and bow, which proves highly effective. He also begins to craft his own bows and sees a huge improvement in his ability to fight. When he comes back into town, the cheap potions sold by NPCs are no longer available so everyone demands potions from Earth. The bully returns and demands potions from Earth and to steal from those that had been waiting in line. Earth accepts a PvP and defeats him easily with the two players inviting him to join their party.
2	"Earth Joins His First Party"; Transliteration: "Āsu, Pāti ni Hatsu Sanka Suru" (Japanese: アース、パーティに初参加する)	Naoyoshi Kusaka	Touko Machida	Takeshi Mori	October 10, 2023
Earth joins a new party, Blue Color, with the two friends he made and was introduced to their party. His two friends were a mage with multiple spell types and Swei, a swordsman. The others in the party included an upfront melee fighter with short swords and healing magic, a tank with a shield and axe, and a swordsman with a bastard sword. They decide to take on a bear and feel confident since Earth is with them. Earth is able to scout out a lone bear using his far seeing ability and uses his sneak and bow combo to land a shot. This enrages the bear and luckily the tank is able to use taunt and pull aggro from the bear. The other party members try and fail to harm the bear. Earth finally aims for between the eyes of the bear and lands a shot that enrages the bear further. Using wind magic to increase his movement, he uses his kick ability to drive the arrow in deeper and then mage hits the bear with fire lance to finish it off. Everyone is starving after the bear so Earth makes them wolf skewers and tells them he cannot give out his recipes because the quality would not be the same. Earth then goes to explore the forest and enrages a colony of ants. He dies and is revived back in town, where he receives a message about a major update that will allow players to have fairies for support in game. Earth continues to work on his bow skills and crafting abilities until he is able to specialize in a hunting bow skill. Along the way he also makes new attachments for his boots as a weapon for his kicks and creates new arrow heads to fight against the ants. He is finally able to get revenge along with being able to collect their bodies to make armor. Everyone in the party is able to contract their fairy but Earth is the only one to fail after cracking his crystal during the ritual. Earth hopes he will still have a chance as all the fairies flock to him.
3	"Earth, Fairy-playah?"; Transliteration: "Āsu, Yōsei o Tarashikomu?" (Japanese: アース、妖精をたらしこむ？)	Ryūta Yamamoto	Shunma Hara	Kunihisa Sugishima	October 17, 2023
Earth is still without a fairy but a new announcement about the game explains that the second half of the fairy event would allow PvP amongst players as a way to level up and evolve their fairies. Also players can earn new titles and those that did not create a contract in the first half can get a second chance through PvP. Earth is known by his title Fairy Playah and all fairies refuse to PvP against him. Instead Earth ends up making fairy treats that become a necessity as fairies refuse NPC food. Also watching a PvP match with a new party member lets him see a fairy refuse a command if they are not treated well. The player with their wolf fairy that refused their order seek out Earth's advice. Earth tells him to simply treat his fairy as a friend and his efforts will be reciprocated. He makes karaage for the player to feed his fairy and work on their bond. An old knight in armor named Silver watches and asks to speak to Earth.
4	"Earth Receives a Reward He's Not Sure He's Happy About"; Transliteration: "Āsu, Anmari Sunao ni Yorokobenai Hōshū o Morau" (Japanese: アース、あんまり素直に喜べない報酬をもらう)	Masayuki Iimura	Kunihiko Okada	Yasuo Iwamoto	October 24, 2023
Silver tells Earth about his ex party member Glad that has been seeking out those with the Fairy Playa title. Glad was unable to get a fairy during the first half of the event just like Earth. This made Glad resent his party members and all other players with fairies. He finally found a dark wolf fairy and kept seeking out others to fight. Silver warns Earth so Earth hunts monsters and seeks out ore to make new arrow heads and a new whip. He finds an explosive ore that he uses to create small bombs and level his skills. During the final PvP battle against the top 16 players, Silver and Glad have their rematch. Glad wins and his fairy evolves into a humanoid fairy queen that battles Glad and refuses to follow him. She rewards those with the Fairy Playa title by evolving their fairies and challenges Earth.
5	"Earth Has a Big Battle with the Queen"; Transliteration: "Āsu, Joō-sama to Dohade ni Tatakau" (Japanese: アース、女王様とド派手に戦う)	Naoyoshi Kusaka	Kōji Bandai	Dojagagen	October 31, 2023
6	"Earth Gets Excited Over a New Dungeon"; Transliteration: "Āsu, Shin Danjon Jissō de Tenshon Agaru" (Japanese: アース、新ダンジョン実装でテンション上がる)	Hideki Hiroshima	Kunihiko Okada	Takeshi Mori	November 7, 2023
7	"Earth Challenges a Boss"; Transliteration: "Āsu, Bosu ni Idomu" (Japanese: アース、ボスに挑む)	Kyōhei Ōyabu	Kōji Bandai	Yasuo Iwamoto	November 14, 2023
8	"Earth Meets a Dragonian Girl"; Transliteration: "Āsu, Ryūjin Shōjo to Deau" (Japanese: アース、龍人少女と出会う)	Toshiaki Kanbara	Shunma Hara	Takeshi Mori	November 21, 2023
9	"Earth Goes to the Fairy Kingdom"; Transliteration: "Āsu, Yōseikoku e Iku" (Japanese: アース、妖精国へ行く)	Naoyoshi Kusaka	Touko Machida	Dojagagen	November 28, 2023
10	"Earth Gets a Partner"; Transliteration: "Āsu, Aibō ga Dekiru" (Japanese: アース、相棒ができる)	Naoyoshi Kusaka	Kunihiko Okada	Takeshi Mori	December 5, 2023
11	"Earth Finds a Baby Dragon"; Transliteration: "Āsu, Akachan Doragon o Hirō" (Japanese: アース、赤ちゃんドラゴンを拾う)	Tomihiko Okubo	Kōji Bandai	Tomihiko Okubo	December 12, 2023
12	"Earth Gets Angry"; Transliteration: "Āsu, Okoru" (Japanese: アース、怒る)	Yuichi Nakazawa	Touko Machida	Yuichi Nakazawa, Takeshi Mori	December 19, 2023

== Reception ==
The series won "The AlphaPolis 6th Fantasy Novel Grand Prize" reader award, and has 1.5 million copies in circulation.

Volumes of the manga adaptation have ranked on the Oricon bestseller chart.

== See also ==
- Re:Monster, another light novel series with the same illustrator
