= Chitose Morinaga =

Japanese voice actress

- 森永 千才
- Born: January 8 Kanagawa Prefecture, Japan
- Occupation: Voice actress
- Years active: 2014–present
- Agent: Stay Luck
- Height: 170 cm (5 ft 7 in)

Chitose Morinaga (森永 千才, Morinaga Chitose; born January 8) is a Japanese voice actress from Kanagawa Prefecture, Japan. She was previously affiliated with Sigma Seven, but is currently associated with Stay Luck.

== Filmography ==
=== Anime television series ===
- Seraph of the End (2015), Fumie Hyakuya
- Shomin Sample (2015), Karen Jinryō
- Tantei Kageki Milky Holmes TD (2015), Harmony (White)
- Anne Happy (2016), Timothy, Tsubaki Sayama
- High School Fleet (2016), Thea Kruetzer
- New Game! (2016), Umiko Ahagon
- Rilu Rilu Fairilu (2016), Nameko
- Tales of Zestiria the X (2016), Ganette
- The Asterisk War Season 2 (2016), Flora Klemm
- Ani ni Tsukeru Kusuri wa Nai! (2017), Myaomyao
- New Game!! (2017), Umiko Ahagon
- Aikatsu Stars! (2018), Merlion Carey
- Pastel Memories (2019), Nejire Usagi
- Sword Art Online Alternative: Gun Gale Online (2018), Milana Sidorova/Toma
- Healin' Good Pretty Cure (2020), Emily Smith
- Yu-Gi-Oh! Sevens (2020/2021/2022), Noodle Sorako, Finger Chikako, Sweets Kakako, Flash Umiko, Hire Yureko, Konvoy Sagawa
- Iii Icecrin (2021), Chicchi
- Yu-Gi-Oh! Go Rush!! (2022), Venus Ganiko
- Legend of Mana: The Teardrop Crystal (2022), Sproutlings
- The Tale of the Outcasts (2023), Maurie
- Urusei Yatsura (2023), Ginger
- Am I Actually the Strongest? (2023), Gigan
- A Playthrough of a Certain Dude's VRMMO Life (2023), Pikasha
- Unnamed Memory (2024), Narc
- A Terrified Teacher at Ghoul School! (2024), Marshmallow
- Headhunted to Another World: From Salaryman to Big Four! (2025), Orle
- 2200-Nen Neko no Kuni Nippon (2025), Kinako
- Snowball Earth (2026), Makoto Saionji

=== Anime film ===
- High School Fleet: The Movie (2020), Thea Kruetzer

=== Video games ===
- Ore ni Hatarakette Iwarete mo Tori (2016), Hartinia Cordouta
- New Game!: The Challenge Stage! (2017), Umiko Ahagon
- Azur Lane (2017), USS West Virginia (BB-48)
- Alice Gear Aegis (2018), Meika Yorozuba, Mari Jingūji
- Fate/Grand Order (2018), Bradamante
- Samurai Shodown (2019), Shiki
- Arknights (2019), Bena
- Blue Archive (2021), Kawawa Shizuko
- Gate of Nightmares (2021), Ronja, Silphy
- Massage Freaks (2022), Momiji
