= The Villainess and the Demon Knight =

Japanese light novel series

- First light novel volume cover

悪役令嬢と鬼畜騎士 (Akuyaku Reijō to Kichiku Kishi)
- Genre: Drama; Isekai; Romantic fantasy
- Novel series
- Written by: Nekoda
- Published by: Moonlight Novels (Shōsetsuka ni Narō)
- Original run: December 6, 2017 – present
- Light novel
- Written by: Nekoda
- Illustrated by: Asahiko
- Published by: Ichijinsha
- English publisher: NA: Seven Seas Entertainment
- Imprint: Ichijinsha Melissa
- Original run: November 2, 2020 – present
- Volumes: 5
- Manga
- Written by: Nekoda
- Illustrated by: Seikan
- Published by: Ichijinsha
- English publisher: NA: Seven Seas Entertainment
- Imprint: Zero Sum Comics
- Magazine: Zero Sum Online
- Original run: July 16, 2021 – present
- Volumes: 5
- icon

The Villainess and the Demon Knight (悪役令嬢と鬼畜騎士, Akuyaku Reijō to Kichiku Kishi) is a Japanese light novel series written by Nekoda and illustrated by Asahiko. It initially began serialization on the Moonlight Novels female adult section of Shōsetsuka ni Narō in December 2017. It was later acquired by Ichijinsha who began publishing the series under its Ichijinsha Melissa light novel imprint in November 2020. A manga adaptation illustrated by Seikan began serialization on Ichijinsha's Zero Sum Online manga website in July 2021.

== Synopsis ==
Cecilia, the daughter of a marquis, has suddenly realized that she is a person who was reincarnated into an otome game as the villainess of that game. However, at the point of the story, she has already faced condemnation as she had her engagement canceled and was forced into prostitution. Her first client is the heroine's childhood friend Lucas Herbst, much to Cecilia's terror. However, Lucas offers to make her his fiancée.

== Media ==
=== Light novel ===
Written by Nekoda, The Villainess and the Demon Knight initially began serialization on the Moonlight Novels female adult section of the user-generated novel publishing website Shōsetsuka ni Narō on December 6, 2017. It was later acquired by Ichijinsha who began publishing it with illustrations by Asahiko under its Ichijinsha Melissa light novel imprint on November 2, 2020. Five volumes have been released as of February 12, 2025. The light novels are licensed in English by Seven Seas Entertainment.

No.	Original release date	Original ISBN	North American release date	North American ISBN
1	November 11, 2020	978-4-7580-9306-4	October 29, 2024	979-8-89160-619-7
Chapters 1–4; Bonus; Special short story
2	July 1, 2021	978-4-7580-9375-0	February 18, 2025	979-8-89160-887-0
Chapters 1–5; Interlude: Dirk; Interlude: Andreas; Special short story
3	April 1, 2022	978-4-7580-9450-4	June 17, 2025	979-8-89160-992-1
Chapters 1–6; Bonus: Cecilia; Bonus: Lucas
4	December 27, 2023	978-4-7580-9608-9	October 21, 2025	979-8-89373-560-4
Chapters 1–4; Bonus story
5	February 3, 2025	978-4-7580-9703-1	February 17, 2026	979-8-89561-868-4
Chapters 1–5

=== Manga ===
A manga adaptation illustrated by Seikan began serialization on Ichijinsha's Zero Sum Online manga website on July 16, 2021. The manga's chapters have been collected into five tankōbon volumes as of February 2026.

During their panel at Anime Expo 2022, Seven Seas Entertainment announced that they licensed the manga for English publication.

No.	Original release date	Original ISBN	North American release date	North American ISBN
1	January 31, 2022	978-4-7580-3704-4	March 28, 2023	978-1-63858-896-2
Chapters 1–5; Short story
2	October 31, 2022	978-4-7580-3809-6	August 8, 2023	979-8-88843-004-0
Chapters 6–10; Short story
3	October 31, 2023	978-4-7580-3950-5	July 23, 2024	979-8-88843-428-4
Chapters 11–15; Short story
4	November 7, 2024	978-4-7580-8608-0	June 3, 2025	979-8-89373-263-4
Chapters 16–21; Short story
5	February 28, 2026	978-4-7580-8970-8	October 20, 2026	979-8-89561-726-7
Chapters 22–26; Short story

== Reception ==
By December 2023, the series had over 1.5 million copies in circulation.

The manga adaptation, alongside The Transfer Destination Was a World with few Pharmacists, won the Isekai Comic Prize at NTT Solmare's Digital Comic Awards in 2024.
