= New Saga =

Japanese light novel series

- First light novel volume cover

強くてニューサーガ (Tsuyokute Nyū Sāga)
- Genre: Fantasy
- Novel series
- Written by: Masayuki Abe
- Published by: Shōsetsuka ni Narō
- Original run: May 2012 – June 2018
- Light novel
- Written by: Masayuki Abe
- Illustrated by: Ryūta Fuse
- Published by: AlphaPolis
- Original run: April 8, 2013 – June 30, 2025
- Volumes: 11
- Manga
- Written by: Jun Miura
- Published by: AlphaPolis
- English publisher: Alpha Manga
- Original run: February 20, 2014 – July 20, 2023
- Volumes: 11
- Anime television series
- Directed by: Naoki Mizusawa; Naoki Horiuchi (Note: Series episode director.)
- Written by: Kenta Ihara
- Music by: Shachō; Hironori Anazawa
- Studio: Sotsu; Studio Clutch
- Licensed by: Crunchyroll
- Original network: ABC TV, Tokyo MX, BS12 TwellV, AT-X
- Original run: July 3, 2025 – September 18, 2025
- Episodes: 12
- icon

New Saga (強くてニューサーガ, Tsuyokute Nyū Sāga; lit."Be Stronger! New Saga" or "New Saga Plus") is a Japanese light novel series written by Masayuki Abe and illustrated by Ryūta Fuse. It was serialized online between May 2012 and June 2018 on the user-generated novel publishing website Shōsetsuka ni Narō. It was later acquired by AlphaPolis, who have published eleven volumes between April 2013 and June 2025. A manga adaptation with art by Jun Miura was serialized online via AlphaPolis' manga website between February 2014 and July 2023 and was collected in eleven tankōbon volumes. The manga is published digitally in English through Alpha Manga. An anime television series adaptation produced by Sotsu and Studio Clutch aired from July to September 2025.

== Plot ==
The demon king is intent on eliminating the human race at the head of his demon army. The hero, Kail, and his allies attack the demon king's castle and succeed in defeating him, but at what cost? Kail loses all his allies in this war: friends, family, loves, comrades. They are all dead, and he is also dying. As Kail is about to die in one of the demon king's rooms, he notices a strange gem, grabs it, and is suddenly enveloped by a bright light that transports him to the past. Recovering from his initial shock and finding himself in his young body, he decides to become stronger to avoid making the mistakes he made previously.

== Characters ==
Kyle (カイル, Kairu)
Voiced by: Yuma Uchida (Japanese); Kyle Igneczi (English)
The protagonist. In the original timeline, he was a soldier who became a hero to the humanoid races after obtaining a holy sword. As the demonic invasion advanced through the humanoid lands, Kyle lost his homeland, friends and family. In the final battle, he killed the demon king, but at the cost of his friends and loved ones. He then noticed a magical jewel, the Divine Dragon Heart, in the demon king's possession and after touching it, he is suddenly transported to the past. Kyle decides to become a hero so he can have the influence required to help the nations be better prepared for the war. Kyle originally suffered from major depressive disorder before the war, so his sudden change in personality is seen with relief by those close to him.
Theron (セラン, Seran)
Voiced by: Hiro Shimono (Japanese); Kyle Phillips (English)
Kyle's best friend and a fellow swordsman, though unable to use magic. In the original timeline, the party was attacked by the demon king's lieutenants. Theron stayed behind to hold them off to give Kyle a chance to kill the demon king. In the new timeline, Kyle asks him to join him in his journey to become a famous hero. He appears obsessed with women and is somewhat of a pervert, but is also a strong fighter.
Lise (リーゼ, Rīze)
Voiced by: Fairouz Ai (Japanese); Rebecca Danae (English)
Kyle's childhood friend, with whom he shares mutual feelings, and a proficient martial artist trained by monks. In the original timeline, she lived in Kyle's hometown, near the border, and died in the initial invasion. In the new timeline, upon watching Kyle approach Urza, Lise becomes jealous and hastily decides to join him in his journey. Despite being love rivals with Urza, they also get along well. She fights with a pair of gauntlets.
Urza (ウルザ, Uruza)
Voiced by: Asami Seto (Japanese); Jaclyn Thomas (English)
An elven sorceress and Kyle's lover in the original timeline. She shared her true name, "Eksess", with Kyle shortly before the final battle and married him. She died protecting him from an ambush by the demon king. In the new timeline, Kyle sees her when she is visiting his hometown and accidentally utters her true name. Urza is scared that Kyle would use her true name for nefarious purposes, so Kyle offers to sign a magical contract and be sworn into secrecy, serving as her initial reason to join him in his journey. She and Lise get along well despite being love rivals. She fights using a magical bracelet that allows her to summon elemental creatures.
Sildonia (シルドニア, Shirudonia)
Voiced by: Minami Takahashi (Japanese); Sarah Wiedenheft (English)
The prodigious queen of an ancient, magically advanced empire who now exists in Kyle's Holy Sword. She was destroyed in the original timeline as a result of the battle with the Demon Lord. She is the only one who knows about the previous timeline that Kyle experienced, but agrees to keep it a secret by pretending that she has prophetic powers. Her true form is the gem in the Holy Sword, and she can take the form of a human girl or an animal. She is also known to eat a lot to preserve her magical energy.
Milena (ミレーナ, Mirēna)
Voiced by: Kaori Maeda
A cunning princess that will soon become queen. In the original timeline, she was assassinated by Zentos and her brother Carenas, who wants the throne for himself, but the whole ordeal was actually arranged by her secretly jealous father Remonas. In the alternate timeline, Kyle and his party prevent this. She hopes to tie the party closer to her nation and sends them to Karan as an undisclosed test.
Zentos (ゼントス, Zentosu)
Voiced by: Hiroki Yasumoto
A knight captain who trained Kyle in the original timeline. In the alternate timeline, he and Kyle never met, though Kyle still knows him. He and Carenas both seek to kill Milena so that Carenas can take the throne. He is eventually killed by Kyle. It is later revealed that he was loyal to a fault, working for Remonas, who is the true mastermind behind the assassination attempt.
Miranda (ミランダ)
Voiced by: Riho Sugiyama
Milena's ambassador. In the prime timeline, she was an essential diplomat and administrator during the war.
Gō (ゴウ)
Voiced by: Rie Hikisaka
A magic item artificer and Gazas' stepson. In the prime timeline, he is one of the creators of a mechanical war golem adapted from ancient schematics that helped turn the tides of war.
Gazas (ガザス, Gazasu)
Voiced by: Tetsu Inada
A dwarf blacksmith and Gō's stepfather.
Ganias (ガニアス, Ganiasu)
Voiced by: Takehito Koyasu
One of the demons who seeks a magical sword called Rand in Karan. He is killed by Kyle.
Yūriga (ユーリガ)
Voiced by: Yoko Hikasa
One of the demons who seeks a magical sword called Rand in Karan.
Seraia (セライア)
Voiced by: Hisako Kanemoto (Japanese); Kara Edwards (English)
Kyle's mother and one of the few living Archmages in the human lands. In the original timeline, she also died in the demon army's attack on Kyle's hometown, but in the new timeline, she is still alive and able to educate Kyle about the Divine Dragon Heart.
Leila (レイラ, Reira)
Voiced by: Akeno Watanabe
Theron's mother and Kyle's master in swordfighting. She volunteers her son to join Kyle's journey.
Carenas
Milena's incompetent but also power-hungry brother. He seeks to kill his sister and take the throne for himself with Zentos' help, but his plan fails and he is arrested.
Arko
One of Milena's maids, who possesses fire magic.
Ninos
One of Milena's maids.
Kilren
Milena's bodyguard.
Remonas
Milena and Carenas's father. Although he seems friendly in public, he is actually insecure, selfish, and uncaring. He is later revealed to be the true mastermind behind his daughter's assassination attempt, because he knows she will be a far greater ruler than him and he cannot stand the thought of his legacy only being remembered as her father and not a king in his own right. Kyle kills him to ensure that he cannot try and kill his daughter again.
Alzard
Gargan's court sorcerer, who is also an old friend of Seraia's.
Bax
Karan's governor, who has been cloistered for months, citing an illness. He made a deal with two demons to save Karan, only to be betrayed. He soon dies from his disease.
Ruiza
The ruler of the demons. She has no desire for war, but some demons are dissatisfied with her choice and attempt to force her out of power.

== Media ==
=== Light novels ===
The series was serialized online by Masayuki Abe between May 2012 and June 2018 on the user-generated novel publishing website Shōsetsuka ni Narō. It was later acquired by AlphaPolis, who have published it in eleven volumes between April 2013 and June 2025 with illustrations by Ryūta Fuse.

No.	Release date	ISBN
1	April 8, 2013	978-4434177941
2	October 7, 2013	978-4434183652
3	April 2, 2014	978-4434190421
4	October 8, 2014	978-4434197444
5	May 3, 2015	978-4434205866
6	December 29, 2015	978-4434214875
7	September 4, 2016	978-4434223587
8	April 5, 2017	978-4434231261
9	October 28, 2017	978-4434239106
10	July 2, 2018	978-4434246920
11	June 30, 2025	978-4434359545

=== Manga ===
A manga adaptation with art by Jun Miura was serialized online via AlphaPolis' manga website between February 20, 2014, and July 20, 2023, and was collected in eleven tankōbon volumes, published from October 31, 2014, to June 30, 2025. The manga was published digitally in English through Alpha Manga.

No.	Original release date	Original ISBN	English release date	English ISBN
1	October 31, 2014	978-4434197062	August 25, 2023	—
2	September 30, 2015	978-4434209413	August 25, 2023	—
3	April 30, 2016	978-4434217937	August 25, 2023	—
4	December 31, 2016	978-4434226489	November 30, 2023	—
5	November 30, 2017	978-4434238703	November 30, 2023	—
6	September 30, 2018	978-4434250224	February 29, 2024	—
7	August 31, 2019	978-4434262319	February 29, 2024	—
8	August 31, 2020	978-4434277894	February 29, 2024	—
9	August 31, 2021	978-4434292774	October 25, 2024	—
10	October 31, 2022	978-4434310249	October 25, 2024	—
11	June 30, 2025	978-4434359491	August 5, 2025	—

=== Anime ===
An anime television series adaptation was announced on October 19, 2022. The series was originally scheduled for July 2023, but was delayed on May 26, 2023, due to "various circumstances". It was also originally set to be animated by Makaria and Yokohama Animation Laboratory and directed by Norikazu Ishigooka, but following the postponement, it was replaced with Sotsu and Studio Clutch on animation production and Naoki Mizusawa as director. Kenta Ihara handled series' composition, Nilitsu drafted original animation character designs designed by Atsushi Asahi, and Shachō of Soil & "Pimp" Sessions and Hironori Anazawa composed the series' music. The series aired from July 3 to September 18, 2025, on ABC TV and other networks. (Note: ABC lists the series premiere on July 2, 2025, at 26:15, which is effectively July 3 at 2:15 a.m. JST.) The opening theme song is "Enja" (演者; Actor), performed by 4s4ki, while the ending theme song is "her", performed by Mahiru Coda. Crunchyroll streamed the series.

==== Episodes ====
No.	Title	Directed by (Note: Production staff information is taken from the ending credits of each episode.)	Storyboarded by	Original release date
1	"I'll Change My Fate"; Transliteration: "Subete no Owari, Soshite Hajimari" (Japanese: 全ての終わり、そして始まり)	Ryōichi Nakata	Kenta Ihara	July 3, 2025
In an alternate world, a wise Demon King maintained peace between demons and other races for 300 years, until he was replaced by a war-like Demon King who began the Great Invasion. In a desperate last battle, the Hero Kyle assassinated the Demon King at the cost of his family, friends, his fiancée, and his holy sword. His life fading, Kyle grabs a nearby magic stone and is sent back in time to his youth, before the Great Invasion when his friends Lise and Theron are still alive. He consults his mother Ceraia, one of only a few human Archmages, and learns time altering spells do exist but even the strongest Archmages didn't have enough magic to travel more than a few seconds into the past. Kyle realizes that the Demon King must have begun the Great Invasion so that the life force of everyone that died could be stored in the jewel the Divine Dragon Heart until there was enough magic for real time travel, only for Kyle to end up using it. Kyle remembers his town was the first destroyed in the Great Invasion, along with Lise being killed, which is now 3 years in the future. He decides he must somehow save the world, only to realize he is now 4 years younger and doesn't have the Hero's power or his Holy Sword yet.
2	"The Hero's Conditions"; Transliteration: "Eiyū no Jōken" (Japanese: 英雄の条件)	Ryōichi Nakata	Kenta Ihara	July 10, 2025 (Note: This episode aired at 2:25 a.m. JST, 10 minutes after the original air time on ABC TV.)
Liese and Theron worry about Kyle's sudden personality change. Theron's mother Layla claims Kyle must have met a woman, making Lise jealous. Kyle realizes he needs heroic influence if he is going to stop the Great Invasion, for which he will need money and an already influential person's support. As such, he plans to travel to the capital with Theron, but chooses to leave Lise behind where she will be safe. Before leaving, Kyle spots an elf named Urza, one of his future lovers, but accidentally uses her secret true name Eksess, causing Lise to demand she accompany him after all. Urza is furious since elves' true names can be used to control them, but Kyle offers to sign a magic contract that forbids him using her name for evil. Urza agrees, but as contracts require a full moon, she is forced to join them until the next one. First, Kyle leads them to a labyrinth in the Sungard Mountains, though as he has future knowledge of the place, he is able to dig a tunnel from the outside straight to the treasure room, bypassing the traps and monsters. This solves Kyle's need for money. During this time, Lise and Urza relax in a hot springs that Urza made as Kyle tries to prevent Theron from spying on them. Reaching the treasure room, Kyle also locates his sentient holy sword, which transforms into a young girl to challenge him.
3	"Application of the Contract"; Transliteration: "Keiyaku no Ōyō" (Japanese: 契約の応用)	Ryōichi Nakata	Kenta Ihara	July 17, 2025
The sword, Sildonia, is outraged Kyle skipped the labyrinth's challenges, but after seeing his memories of future events, she realizes that he is from the future and agrees to act like she and Kyle only just met. With the labyrinth treasure, Kyle buys everyone top quality equipment. Kyle learns from Sildonia that when he time-travelled, he created an alternate second timeline that he can probably change any way he wants. It is also likely Kyle was fused with the alternate Kyle, so he has two heroic souls inside him that will either make him extremely powerful, or kill him. This also means there are now two Divine Dragon Hearts. The full moon appears so Urza begins the contract ritual which Kyle seals by kissing her. Urza is outraged since sealing with a kiss is reserved for elvish marriages, burning him in response. Kyle decides they will go to Archen, justifying this by claiming Sildonia has prophetic powers. They reach Archen during a visit by popular future queen Milena. Kyle reveals to Sildonia that Milena will be killed by a Hydra in two days. Suspicion will fall on her half-brother Carenas, but eventually Carenas will take the throne and become a useless king. This time, Kyle intends to prevent Milena's death so she becomes a good queen and offers him her royal influence to become the hero.
4	"The Perfect Start to a Heroic Tale"; Transliteration: "Jōdekina Eiyūtan no Hajimari" (Japanese: 上出来な英雄譚の始まり)	Ryōichi Nakata	Kenta Ihara	July 24, 2025 (Note: This episode aired at 4:00 a.m. JST, 1 hour and 45 minutes after the original air time on ABC TV.)
Kyle knows Milena will die travelling from Archen to Sanes village, but is unsure of the exact location, so they are forced to follow Milena's carriage in secret until she is attacked. Kyle is also concerned Carenas, who might be behind Milena's death, is in Archen, but hiding from the public. Sildonia shapeshifts into a falcon to observe the carriage from the sky. Kyle is surprised when, instead of the Hydra, Milena's carriage drivers kill her guards and spread a magic powder on the ground. Kyle knocks the drivers unconscious, but the powder attracts dozens of hellhounds plus the Hydra. Having been able to prepare in advance, Kyle's new armor makes him immune to the Hydra's poison, and uses ice and fire magic crystals to first freeze the Hydra's scales, then shatter them. With the flesh exposed, Kyle is able to thrust all his fire crystals into the Hydra's chest and blow it apart. As Milena and her maids had been drugged unconscious, Kyle uses antidote potions to wake them. In Archen, Carenas sends more men after Milena. Milena surprisingly reveals the man who actually wants her dead is Zentos, captain of the army's Second Battalion, and that Carenas is helping him so he can take the throne for himself. Milena has her maid Arka burn her guards bodies until they are unrecognizable, hoping the men following might think one of the bodies is her and the assassination was successful. Theron also uses the last of the powder to attract monsters to help slow them down. Repairing her carriage, Kyle's group flee with Milena.
5	"Reunion At Dawn"; Transliteration: "Mimei no Saikai" (Japanese: 未明の再会)	Ryōichi Nakata	Kenta Ihara	July 31, 2025
Milena explains Carenas is too incompetent to plan an assassination, so the actual plan was made by Zentos; however, Carenas is still the mastermind behind the assassination attempt. Milena hopes her bodyguard Kilren and her Fifth Battalion will soon arrive and protect her from Zentos' Second Battalion. Kyle suggests they turn around and charge right through the Second and reach the Fifth in Archen before the confused Second can catch up. The plan is successful, but the confused Second manage to resume chasing them. The carriage wheel shatters, so they go on foot, leaving a confused Theron to delay the Second. Milena feels guilty at leaving Theron to die, but Lise reveals their party's secret; in terms of physical strength, swordsmanship, and savagery in battle, Theron surpasses Lise and Kyle, but hides it acting as a perverted fool. Theron slaughters the entire Second Battalion and starts walking back to Archen. Zentos leaves Archen to find them, shooting down Sildonia along the way, so Kyle hides Milena in the forest. Milena becomes suspicious of Kyle's motives. Kyle confronts Zentos and asks him to surrender, but Zentos refuses and attacks him. Kyle survives his illusion based attack style, surprising Zentos as no one else had ever done so. Kyle regrets he might have to kill Zentos, since in his original timeline, Zentos was his friend and the man who taught him to fight with a magic sword.
6	"Brothers In Arms"; Transliteration: "Senyū" (Japanese: 戦友)	Ryōichi Nakata	Kenta Ihara	August 7, 2025 (Note: This episode aired at 2:45 a.m. JST, 30 minutes after the original air time on ABC TV.)
Zentos' sword is shattered by Kyle's holy sword and he shares a tearful goodbye before Zentos' death. Carenas is arrested and Milena introduces Kyle to her father King Remonas. The public is informed Zentos and the Second Battalion were wiped out by monsters. Kyle is named Hero of Zirgus Kingdom. In private, Remonas is revealed to have been behind the assassination attempt as he fears Milena becoming a better Queen than he was a King. He is confronted in his room by Kyle, who already knew all of this, and throws Remonas from his balcony, disguising his death as an accident. Milena reveals she has a fiancé, Prince Maiser of Gargan Empire; arranged in secret by Remonas so he could claim ownership of Karan City which sits between the two kingdoms. Milena plans to refuse the engagement and wants Kyle to convince Karan's governor to remain loyal to her. Sildonia points out there is obviously something in Karan that Milena wants him to investigate. Despite the risk, Kyle is pleased to be away from Milena as she is craftier than she acts and is clearly planning something. Kyle learns Karan is controlled by the Blacksmith's Guild, whose leader owns most of the city. Kyle's group leave for Karan, with Milena still considering Kyle to be quite useful to her.
7	"To The Blacksmith's Nation"; Transliteration: "Tanya-shi no Kuni e" (Japanese: 鍛冶師の国へ)	Ryōichi Nakata	Kenta Ihara	August 14, 2025
The group discover Gargan Empire representatives already in Karan. Kyle meets Milena's Ambassador Miranda, whom he knows from the future. Gargan's court sorcerer Alzard reveals he was a classmate of Kyle's mother, and he and Miranda don't like each other. Karan's governor Bax claims to be too ill to see anyone, so Miranda decides to have him replaced as governor with the dwarf blacksmith Gazus. While by himself, Theron saves a girl named Goh from thugs, only to learn she is an attractive boy. Goh explains he is a magic item artificer and the thugs were trying to retrieve an investment their boss made in Goh's latest project, unaware it was going to take ten years. Gazus refuses to become governor. Theron arrives with Goh, revealing he is Gazus' stepson. From Goh's notes, Kyle realizes Goh is trying to restore an ancient mechanical golem which, in the future, the Gargan Empire will acquire from him and use against the demons. As such, Kyle secretly supplies Goh with enough cash to finish the golem in a single year, ensuring that Gargan cannot acquire it. Theron requests a sword from Gazus equal to Sildonia, but Gazus explains even he cannot replicate a Xarle sword and he only knows of one other in existence. Kyle hopes his interference won't cause war between the kingdoms before the Great Invasion even occurs. Alzard invites Kyle and Miranda to the Gargan embassy to talk, but when they arrive, they find Alzard murdered by a female demon.
8	"Those Who Act Out of Sight"; Transliteration: "Anyaku Suru Monotachi" (Japanese: 暗躍する者たち)	Ryōichi Nakata	Kenta Ihara	August 21, 2025
The demon flees after Kyle feuds her off and when guards arrive, surprising Kyle as demons never ran before. Sildonia helps Goh with the golem. Theron asks Goh about the second Xarle sword and learns it is the Holy Sword Rand which, being a national treasure, is held by Bax. Thugs attack the house, but are defeated by Kyle's team and admit they were paid to kidnap Goh. Goh remembers there have already been several kidnappings. Another demon attacks the house, allowing the kidnappers to escape. Miranda suspects Bax of being involved in the kidnappings, but before she can investigate, Bax's mansion is burned to the ground and Bax disappears. Theron is disappointed Rand wasn't in the ruins for him to discreetly steal. Miranda is certain Bax set the fire to destroy evidence. Kyle is reminded of Miranda from the future, a cold hearted commander who maintained supply lines and spies throughout the war. Goh reveals Gazus is also missing, having been summoned by Bax right before the fire. Miranda becomes unexpectedly emotional at this, causing Kyle to realize she and Gazus are lovers, and it was his death that turned her cold hearted in the future. He suddenly remembers that future Miranda mentioned a secret tunnel in Bax's mansion she didn't find until Bax was already dead.
9	"Hidden Ambitions"; Transliteration: "Himerareta Yabō" (Japanese: 秘められた野望)	Ryōichi Nakata	Kenta Ihara	August 28, 2025 (Note: This episode aired at 2:21 a.m. JST, 6 minutes after the original air time on ABC TV.)
Kyle has Urza find the tunnel while confirming there are at least two demons; the female that killed Alzard and a male that helped Goh's kidnappers escape. Inside the tunnel, they find a magic circle that sacrifices the kidnapped Karan citizens to produce magic energy for a massive spell. Sildonia diagnoses the magic crystal is of inferior quality and will soon explode, destroying Karan. Kyle and the others hide when the two demons appear. Kyle overhears that the female is merely a servant and it was the male that killed Alzard. The female starts to grow doubtful of the plan. After they leave, Kyle locates Bax and Gazus. Bax reveals Karan's mines that make the city wealthy have finally run dry after 1000 years of mining, risking an invasion by either Zirgus, the Empire, or both. Being terminally ill and desperate, Bax made a deal with the demons. The male demon appears and reveals he planned to use the spell to manipulate the earth and refill the mines with ore, ensuring Karan's future in exchange for the holy sword Rand for the Demon King, but the female is annoyed with the male for revealing too much about their plan. Kyle reveals the spell is actually about to destroy Karan and that they never planned to help Bax at all. The male decides to just kill everyone, despite the female's protests that the Demon King forbade them from killing too many humans. Kyle and the male battle while the female fights Urza and Liese, although with no intention of killing them. Meanwhile, with Sildonia's help, Theron locates Rand, accidentally drawing the demons' attention.
10	"Duel"; Transliteration: "Kettō" (Japanese: 決闘)	Ryōichi Nakata	Kenta Ihara	September 4, 2025
Theron's distraction allows Kyle to snap off one of the male demon's horns, a grave insult to demons, which Kyle knows about. Kyle calls a temporary truce to let both sides recover. He also challenges the male to a duel; if the male wins, Kyle will surrender Rand and return the male's broken horn, but if Kyle wins, the male must reveal the identities of every demon that has infiltrated human society. Agreeing, the demons retreat, promising to return in three days to prepare for the rematch. Miranda and Goh are overjoyed to see Gazus alive after Kyle's team return with him and Bax, who is sent to the clinic. Gazus admits that Bax threatened Miranda's life to get him to ignore the kidnapping of Karan's citizens. Kyle manipulates Gazus into letting Theron keep Rand. He also provides Gazus with mythril from Sildonia's labyrinth to forge an item he needs for the duel. While Liese and Urza are eager to fight the female demon again, Kyle secretly asks Theron to murder both demons if he loses the duel, just in case they target Karan again. Sildonia begins transferring the unstable magic from the demon's circle to Kyle's Divine Dragon Heart. She also reveals the demon's earth moving spell wouldn't have worked anyway as there is no more ore underground to refill the mine with. Three days later, Kyle's group return to the mines to meet up with the demons. Kyle and the male head to another part of the mines while Erza and Liese duel the female, though Theron and Sildonia stay out of the fight. Overconfident, the female takes on a much stronger form, but then receives a gut punch from Liese that knocks her down, unable to breathe. Meanwhile, Kyle and the male prepare for their own battle.
11	"Secret Red-Hot Strategy"; Transliteration: "Shakunetsu no Hisaku" (Japanese: 赤熱の秘策)	Ryōichi Nakata	Kenta Ihara	September 11, 2025
After surviving their final attack, the female asks how they beat her and Liese admits her fighting style is lacking in experience, making it obvious it is her first fight. The female admits they are correct and surrenders, as she needs to return home alive. The girls let her leave after introducing themselves, so she reveals her name is Yuliga. A distrustful Theron suddenly attacks Yuliga when her back is turned. Kyle battles the male into the still-active volcano. Despite being outmatched, he uses the male's horn and adhesive to his advantage and eventually traps the male in a mithril chain that he had Gazus forge earlier. The male admits that the demon king Ruiza is avoiding war with humans and seeks the holy sword to keep the demons under control, but pro-war demons are seeking to remove her from the throne. Kyle demands to know if one of the heirs to the throne is a hornless demon with black wings. The male offers to let Kyle meet Ruiza to ask her about her heirs (which is of course a lie), then summons an assassin demon. Kyle kills it and reveals he knew about the assassin the whole time, having met the male, Garnias, in the future when he killed Kyle's friends. Kyle throws Garnias into the volcano, as he now knows the whereabouts of the demon king's castle. Meanwhile, Theron is revealed to have killed another assassin demon that tried to kill Yuliga under orders from Garnias, though he keeps it to himself that he really was trying to kill Yuliga but switched targets by instinct when the assassin appeared. Yuliga looks forward to fighting them again, as do Liese and Urza.
12	"The Heroic Tale Continues"; Transliteration: "Soshite Eiyū-tan wa Tsuzuku" (Japanese: そして英雄譚は続く)	Ryōichi Nakata	Kenta Ihara	September 18, 2025
Theron tests out a new sword that he made while telling Kyle his opinion of demons, though Kyle was aware that he let Yuliga even after telling him not to; however, he suspects that there's more to their plan than meets the eye. Liese and Urza have recovered from their fight while Kyle and Sildonia visit Goh. As Goh speaks with Sildonia, Kyle goes to talk to Gazus, who has also recovered. As Kyle's group is leaving tomorrow, Gazus gives Kyle sword casings made from mithril. Goh wants Sildonia to stay so he can learn from her, but she declines as she had already gave him everything he needs to know. Visiting Miranda, Kyle learns that Bax has died, but not before revealing the truth of his motives. Miranda grows fearful of future outcomes while also explaining that Gazus has accepted the role of being the next governor. However, Kyle deducts that Miranda was causing financial problems for Goh to get attention from Gazus, though he agrees to let this go as he has no proof. Kyle requests for Miranda to keep Goh's golem project a secret. The next day, Kyle's group leave Karan and head for Zirgus while also growing fearful of the demon's plan. Meanwhile, Milena learns of the Gargan Empire and Zirgus's war and prepares to deal with this issue, sending her subordinates to help Kyle's group. Meanwhile, the three scheming princes of the Gargan Empire learn about Kyle and plan to deal with him. Arriving in Zirgus, Kyle's group attend a ball, where he meets one of the prince's (whom Kyle knows of in the previous timeline), who requests that Kyle serves him or else he will be executed. Meanwhile, Yuliga informs Ruiza of her failure to recover Rand.

== See also ==
- New Game Plus, which is "強くてニューゲーム" in Japanese.
- Is It Wrong to Try to Pick Up Girls in a Dungeon?: Familia Chronicle and The Executioner and Her Way of Life, light novel series illustrated by Nilitsu
