= Rie Hikisaka =

Japanese voice actress

- 引坂理絵
- Born: September 11; Kagoshima Prefecture, Japan
- Occupation: Voice actress
- Agent: Stay Luck

Rie Hikisaka (Japanese: 引坂理絵, Hepburn: Hikisaka Rie; born September 11) is a Japanese voice actress affiliated with Stay Luck. After participating in Stay Luck as a workshop student in 2015, she made her debut as a voice actress in 2016. She was inspired by Inuyasha, and voiced Hana Nono / Cure Yell in HUGtto! PreCure and Chimumu in Waccha PriMagi!.

== Filmography ==
=== Television series ===
2016

- Hanaipa (Arijiro)

2017

- Kirakira Pretty Cure a la Mode (Live Guest / Student, Girl Student, Yapapa, Junko Mitsuoka, Hana Nono / Cure Yell)
- Pittanko! Nekozakana (Chinpei, seagull mother, hippo wife, sea turtle boy, old woman)
- Princess Principal (Merry Jen)
- Soreike! Anpanman (Cat Beauty, Tulip-san, Sisters, Kiiko, Squirrel Girl)
- Doraemon (I)
- Blood Blockade Battlefront & BEYOND (Children)

2018

- Violet Evergarden (Lillian, iris nephew, female)
- Fate/Extra Last Encore (girl student)
- Hug! Pretty Cure (Nono Hana / Cure Yell)
- Hanaipa (Ari Jiro)
- Pop Team Epic (Bacon Mushamsha-kun)
- Layton Mystery Detective Company: Katry's Nazotoki File (Bredda)
- Experimental Family -Creatures Family Days- (Female Caster, Girl)
- Cardfight!! Vanguard (Ingaru, Flash Shield Isolde, Schoolgirl, Fan, Poetry Parthenos, etc.)-3 Series

2019

- Manaria Friends (Elf Daughter)
- Inazuma Eleven Orion's engraving (Che Lin)
- One-Punch Man (Female Citizen C)
- Ojarumaru (customers, couples)
- Dororo (children)
- Cop Craft
- GO! GO! Atom

2020

- Heya Camp (junior high school girls)
- The Gymnastics Samurai (Chibikko C, Boy B, Junior Girls C)

2021

- Megalobox 2: Nomad (Miguel)
- Blue Reflection Ray (Mio)
- To Your Eternity (March)
- Yu-Gi-Oh! Sevens (Drone)
- Waccha PriMagi! (Chimumu)

2024

- The Healer Who Was Banished From His Party, Is, in Fact, the Strongest (Amherst)

2025

- Chikuwa Senki (Nene Inumiya)
- New Saga (Gō)
- Reincarnated as a Neglected Noble: Raising My Baby Brother with Memories from My Past Life (Alice Utsunomiya)
- 2200-Nen Neko no Kuni Nippon (Ai-chan)
- The Apothecary Diaries (Yinghua)

2026

- The Strongest Job Is Apparently Not a Hero or a Sage, but an Appraiser (Provisional)! (Jewel)

=== Films ===
2018

- Pretty Cure Super Stars! (Hana Nono / Cure Yell)
- Hug! Pretty Cure Futari wa Pretty Cure: All Stars Memories (Hana Nono / Cure Yell)

2019

- Pretty Cure Miracle Universe (Hana Nono / Cure Yell)

2020

- A Whisker Away (Shiori Mizoguchi)
- Violet Evergarden (Children)
- Burn the Witch (Osushi)
- Pretty Cure Miracle Leap: A Mysterious Day with Everyone (Hana Nono / Cure Yell)

=== Web animation ===
- Anime Puso Boiled Komi (2019-2020, Tetra) - 2 Series

=== Video games ===
2017

- Luna Puri (Beryl)
- Thousand Memories (Phirel)
- Grand Marche Labyrinth (Platinum, Shan)
- Phantom Beast Princess (Pandora)
- Quiz RPG Wizard and the Black Cat (2017-2019, Enery Nelly, Rail Stale)
- Timed Istalia (Sana, Watatsumi)
- White Cat Project (Kata)
- Sevens Story (Estea, Dahlia)

2018

- Tokyo Conception
- PreCure Tsunagaru Pazurun (Hana Nono/Cure Yell)
- Conquest! Excalibur (Frost, Milledi)
- Youkai Hyakuhimetan! (Daimaen, Shiramine Daimyojin)
- Megiddo 72 (Sara)
- Freezing Extension (Saito Yuma)
- Princess Connect! Re:Dive (2018-2019, women, boys, worshipers, Amegami, etc.)
- Nari Kids Park HUG! Precure (Hana Nono / Cure Yell )

2019

- Phantasy Star Online 2
- Fighting EX Layer (Area)

2020

- Marco and the Galaxy Dragon (Yuko Onda)
- Olympia Soirée (Camelia)
- Echoes of Pandora (Caventers)
- Bleach: Brave Souls (Osushi)

2021

- DC Super Hero Girls Teen Power (Toyman)
- Granblue Fantasy (Ewiyar)

2023

- League of Legends (Briar)
- Path to Nowhere (Dudu)

=== Dubbing ===
- The Rising Hawk (Myroslava (Poppy Drayton)
