= AlphaPolis =

Japanese publishing company

AlphaPolis Co. Ltd.

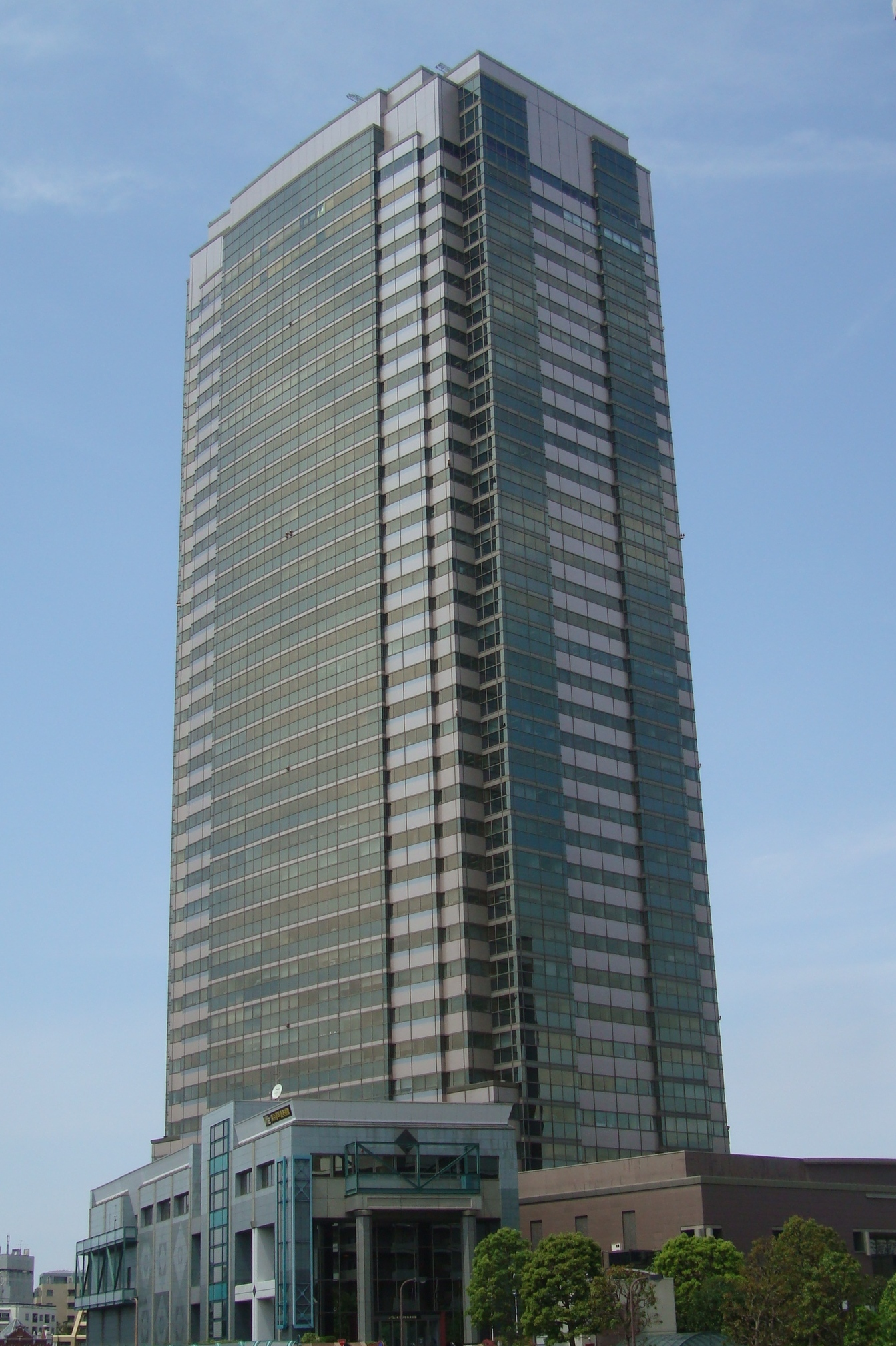
- Headquarters in Shibuya, Tokyo
- Native name: 株式会社アルファポリス
- Romanized name: Kabushiki Gaisha Arufaporisu
- Type: Public
- Traded as: TYO: 9467
- Industry: Publishing
- Founded: August 25, 2000; 26 years ago
- Headquarters: Ebisu, Shibuya, Tokyo, Japan
- Operating income: ¥2.20 billion
- Net income: ¥1.39 billion (2022)
- Subsidiaries: White Fox; NIA Animation
- Website: alphapolis.co.jp

AlphaPolis Co. Ltd. (Japanese: 株式会社アルファポリス, Hepburn: Kabushiki Gaisha Arufaporisu) is a Japanese publishing company located in Shibuya, Tokyo, Japan.

AlphaPolis is a publisher of light novels and manga, particularly for online readers. The company is the publisher for several light novel series, including A Playthrough of a Certain Dude's VRMMO Life, New Saga, and Tsukimichi: Moonlit Fantasy. They are most notable as the publisher of Gate, which has sold 6 million copies. Gate received an anime adaptation that aired from July 4, 2015 to March 26, 2016. Tsukimichi: Moonlit Fantasy also received an anime adaptation that began airing on July 7, 2021.

== History ==
AlphaPolis was launched as a publisher of online content in August, 2000.

In 2010, AlphaPolis acquired the rights to publish Gate, which began as a web novel on Arcadia. The company then began publishing a manga adaptation in July 2011. Several volumes (11, 12, 13, and 14) placed in the Oricon ranking for top 50 manga volume sales.

In 2013, AlphaPolis acquired the rights to publish Tsukimichi: Moonlit Fantasy, which began as a web novel on Shōsetsuka ni Narō. The novel series went on to sell 2 million copies. AlphaPolis began publishing a manga adaptation in 2015. The book received an anime adaptation beginning in September 2021.

A Playthrough of a Dude's VRMMO Life is another series that began as a web novel on Shōsetsuka ni Narō, and was later turned into an AlphaPolis light novel publication in 2014, and manga adaptation also in 2014. The manga placed several volumes (3, 5) on the Oricon bestseller list. An anime adaptation was announced in February 2023.

The Technoroid anime received a manga adaptation via AlphaPolis beginning in January 2023

The company is listed on the Tokyo Stock Exchange and has been since October 2014.

AlphaPolis released the Alpha Manga app in August, 2021 to read AlphaPolis manga on iPhone and Android phones. Several of the AlphaManga titles were subsequently made available through Crunchyroll.

On July 31, 2025, AlphaPolis announced the acquisition of anime studio White Fox. It also acquired the 3DCG animation studio NIA Animation on February 14, 2026.

== List of works ==
=== Light novels ===
- Gate - Thus the JSDF Fought There! (since 2010)
- Re:Monster (since 2012)
- Tsukimichi: Moonlit Fantasy (since 2013)
- New Saga (2013)
- The New Gate (since 2013)
- Multi-Mind Mayhem: Isekai Tensei Soudouki (since 2014)
- A Playthrough of a Certain Dude's VRMMO Life (since 2014)
- Kuro no Sōzō Shōkanshi (since 2015)
- Goodbye, Dragon Life (since 2015)
- A Journey Through Another World: Raising Kids While Adventuring (since 2016)
- Possibly the Greatest Alchemist of All Time (since 2017)
- May I Ask for One Final Thing? (since 2018)
- Re:Monster: Ankoku Tairiku-hen (since 2018)
- The Unaware Atelier Master (since 2018)

=== Manga ===
- Gate - Thus the JSDF Fought There! (2011)
- New Saga (2014)
- Life Train (2014)
- Re:Monster (2014)
- A Playthrough of a Certain Dude's VRMMO Life (2014)
- The New Gate (2014)
- Tsukimichi: Moonlit Fantasy (2015)
- Multi-Mind Mayhem: Isekai Tensei Soudouki (2015)
- Goodbye, Dragon Life (2015)
- Kuro no Sōzō Shōkanshi (2015)
- Ordinary Soldier Dreams of the Past (2016)
- Kuro no Sōzō Shōkanshi: Tenseisha no Hangyaku (2017)
- A Journey Through Another World: Raising Kids While Adventuring (2018)
- Moto Kōzō Kaiseki Kenkyūsha no Isekai Bōkentan (2018)
- Possibly the Greatest Alchemist of All Time (2018)
