= Double Circle =

Double Circle may refer to:

- Double Circle (anime), a 2013 Japanese original net animation
- Double Circle (film), a 1963 Croatian film
