= With Vengeance, Sincerely, Your Broken Saintess =

Japanese manga series

- First tankōbon volume cover

傷だらけ聖女より報復をこめて (Kizu Darake Seijo Yori Hōfuku o Komete)
- Genre: Fantasy; Romance
- Manga
- Written by: Aminohada
- Illustrated by: Sorajima
- Published by: Ichijinsha
- English publisher: NA: Pocket Comics
- Imprint: Comic Lake
- Magazine: Piccoma; Mecha Comic; Comico Japan
- Original run: August 3, 2022 – present
- Volumes: 4
- Anime television series
- Directed by: Chisaki (S1); Saya Fukase (S2)
- Music by: onoken
- Studio: Imagica Infos; Imageworks Studio
- Licensed by: SA/SEA: Medialink
- Original network: tvk, CBC
- Original run: July 10, 2025 – present
- Episodes: 13

With Vengeance, Sincerely, Your Broken Saintess (Japanese: 傷だらけ聖女より報復をこめて, Hepburn: Kizu Darake Seijo Yori Hōfuku o Komete) is a Japanese manga series written by Aminohada and illustrated by Sorajima. It was originally released as a webtoon, before being published online on Piccoma, Mecha Comic and Comico Japan websites since August 2022, and then later being acquired and published by Ichijinsha under their Comic Lake imprint since March 2024. A "light anime" television series adaptation produced by Imagica Infos and Imageworks Studio aired from July to September 2025. A second season premiered in October 2026.

== Plot ==
The story takes place in the kingdom of Zied in a fantasy world. Rua, a baron's orphaned daughter, grew up in a temple to become a candidate for the rank of Saintess, a title founded by a legendary healer in the past, but her healing powers have a vital flaw: She can only heal others by taking their hurts and ailments upon herself. Maligned and ridiculed by the other inhabitants of the Temple, her best friend Arianne seems to be her only supporter. When her crush, Garrett Vance of the Royal Knights, is critically wounded in a fight against a demonic beast, Rua heals him but collapses from the pain. When she recovers, she is devastated to learn that Arianne has taken credit for saving Garrett's life, is set to marry him and become the Temple's new Saintess, a position which has been vacant for ten years after the previous Saintess' demise. When people continue to unjustly deride her, she begins using her powers to hurt them back, revelling in seeing them suffer the same way she did.

Her despair is noted by Sven, the second prince of Zied, and he recruits her for his cause. As he informs her, the Temple's High Priest is conspiring to unleash an artificially made, near-incurable disease on the kingdom's people. By having his sponsored Saintess Arianne heal the infected, he intends to increase the Temple's (and thus, his own) public support and then eventually seize rulership for himself. After catching the High Priest and Arianne at a clandestine meeting, and thus confirming Sven's accusations for herself, Rua joins his plan to stop the conspiracy before it gains momentum in order to get revenge on her malefactors.

== Characters ==
=== Main characters ===
Rua Restoat (ルーア・レストアット, Rūa Resutoatto)
Voiced by: Asami Seto
The main protagonist. A 17-year-old noblewoman of Zied, she manifested healing powers like any potential Saintess, but with the disadvantage that in order to heal others, she has to take their sufferings upon herself, a trait she inherited from her mother. After her parents and younger brother died of a mysterious disease ten years prior, she was taken in by the Temple of Luche, Goddess of Healing, where she became infamous as the "Broken Saintess" for her supposedly flawed ability. Shattered after healing the love of her life, only to be betrayed by her supposed best friend, she starts inflicting all the pain she has suffered on those who hurt her; in the process, her hair changes its color from blonde to white. But despite her bitterness and newfound viciousness, she is smart, courageous and retains her kind heart for the innocent and victimized, and she also finds ways of using her pain-inflicting touch both as a weapon and to heal poisonings by infusing symptoms from other poisons which countermand their effects. She is also touched by Sven's devotion for her and falls in love with him, and for her actions in exposing the High Priest and Arianne's plot to take over the kingdom, she is elected the next Saintess by popular consent.
Sven Zied-Crown (スウェン・ジード = クロウン, Sūen Jīdo Kuroun)
Voiced by: Soma Saito
The second prince of the kingdom of Zied. Despite a dubious reputation of being cursed owing to his red eyes and his mother's near-death in childbirth, Sven is loyal, kind and highly observant, and a skilled violin player, although he does show a darker side on him when he acts for the protection of others. In his childhood, while undertaking a secret trip among the commoners to check on their welfare, he was injured defending a woman and healed by Rua (an event that Rua only faintly remembers), and has fallen in love with her. Years later, after having recognized her and taking notice of her desire for revenge against her tormentors, Sven recruits her for his plan to move against the Temple's High Priest's conspiracy against the kingdom while striving to protect her from suffering more harm at the same time.
Arianne Treviers (アリアン・トレビアーズ, Arian Torebiāzu)
Voiced by: Momo Asakura
A young noblewoman and Saintess candidate; but while she has a healing power, it works strongest only on herself. Ostensibly Rua's best friend in the beginning, she is a manipulative, cunning and sadistic creature who considers Rua a "toy" for her own amusement and drove the other Temple inhabitants into maligning her. For "saving" Garrett from death, she is set to become his wife and the next Saintess of the realm. It is from Sven that Rua learns that Arianne's family is one of three who support the High Priest's plot to seize power over the realm, with Arianne being a willing participant. As the story progresses, Arianne's clash with Rua becomes personal as Rua gains more popular support for her kindness, something Arianne is incapable of showing, making her increasingly insane with jealousy. When the plot is finally exposed, Arianne is defeated by Rua in their final confrontation and is last seen awaiting her execution.

=== Friends and allies ===
Cezee Rubin (シジー・ルビン, Shijī Rubin)
Voiced by: Kazuyuki Okitsu
Sven's trusted aide and friend. He grew up as a street urchin, and wrongly sentenced to death for alleged theft, he was saved by Sven and has been loyal to him since. Stoic and soft-spoken, he is very popular with the ladies. Despite his outwardly cool demeanor, he is a caring man and becomes Rua's personal bodyguard at Sven's request.
Garrett Vance (ガロット・バンス, Garotto Bansu)
Voiced by: Kazuki Ura
The young captain of the Royal Knights and a renowned hero of Zied who wishes to make his father, who was the knights' commander before him until he was disabled in the line of duty, proud. Once one of Rua's patients, he became her first crush when his words encouraged her to continue her work despite her handicap. After she saves his life and Arianne takes credit for the deed, he rejects Rua, but as time passes, he begins to doubt Arianne's sincerity upon witnessing her selfishness and Rua's self-sacrificial courage. After being told the truth about his rescue by the Temple maid Mary, he calls off the wedding, regretfully apologizes to Rua and, disowned by his father, retires from his position, although popular opinion later compels him to return as a sub-commander after the conspiracy is resolved.
Sarid Zied-Crown (サリッド・ジード = クロウン, Sariddo Jīdo Kuroun)
Voiced by: Tomoaki Maeno
The first prince of Zied, and Sven's older brother. Known as the "Ice Prince" for his strict, aloof demeanor, the only person he shows warmer feelings for is his fiancè Diana. For most of the story, he is unaware of the High Priest's plot and his brother's efforts to thwart it, and is slow to trust Rua. After Rua heals Diana from a poisoning attempt, Sarid joins her and Sven in rooting out the High Priest and his fellow traitors.
Diana Peridot (ディアナ・ペリドット, Diana Peridotto)
Voiced by: Minami Tsuda
Diana is the daughter of a highly influential noble house close to the crown, Sarid's fiancé and the future queen of Zied. Cheerful, optimistic - often to the point of over-enthusiasm - and an avid lover of romance literature, she is the only person who can stand up to Sarid's icy behavior. After hearing of Rua's bravery against the demon beast at the Dedmond ball, which incidentally saved her grandmother's life, Diana whole-heartily endorses her as the realm's new Saintess and Sven's eventual wife. When she is infected with the Black Rose disease by the High Priest and Rosen Shroud to discredit the new chancellor Regiel, she is saved by Rua and Sven and assists them in thwarting the villanous plot.
Luis Riston (ルイズ・リストン, Ruizu Risuton)
Voiced by: Reiō Tsuchida
A bespectacled young man from a country to the east, and the eldest son of an influential merchant family. He is earnest, though very emotional, and a skilled tailor and baker; Sven likes to tease him by calling him Apple Glasses Guy (リンゴメガネくん, Ringo Megane-kun). Too clumsy and untalented for taking over his father's business, Luis became a servant at the Restoat mansion and Rua's caretaker. After her family's death, he was forced to return to his father until one of his younger sisters inherited the family business, and upon returning to Zied, he was employed by Diana and quickly became her favorite servant. After meeting Rua again, he shares his suspicions with her that her family's death was in fact committed by the High Priest himself, and they find evidence for that in the diary of Rua's mother, which she left to her daughter as a final clue.
Charlotte Mayle (シャーロット・メイル, Shārotto Meiru)
A young woman who worked for Ross Dedmond's family as a maid. After becoming betrothed to her childhood friend Alan, a baker, she intended to quit her job at the mansion, but was raped by Ross; when Alan confronted the viscount, Ross sabotaged his business and had Charlotte dismissed. Charlotte tries to assassinate Ross during his birthday party, but is prevented by Sven and Rua, who take sympathy on her pain and force Ross to pay her and Alan a sizeable recompense for his crimes against them. After the case is settled, Charlotte and Andi get married, and they and Charlotte's fellow victims become Rua's first supporters among the commoners.
Lynn Partis (リン・パーティス, Rin Pātisu)
A farmer's son who demonstrated an innate talent for making medicine. He became Rosen Shroud's apprentice until after Shroud and the High Priest murdered Rua's family; Shroud found out about Lynn's knowledge of the plot, but let him leave in a fit of insane generosity. Ten years later, Lynn finds Cezee after the latter is poisoned in an assassination attempt while stalking Shroud, and brings Sven and Rua, who have been looking for Cezee, to him, where Rua cures him with her pain touch. Knowing about Shroud and the High Priest's plot, he joins Rua and Sven in their efforts to stop the traitors. After the crisis is resolved, he is made the royal court's pharmacist.
Yumia Treviers (ユミア・トレビアーズ, Arian Torebiāzu)
Arianne's older sister. Though unaware of her family's involvement in the High Priest's conspiracy, Yumia hates Arianne after the latter pushed her into a fire during a quarrel and refused to heal her out of spite. She was later married off by her parents to the Hennety clan, a noble family from the Southern Islands, where her husband proved kind and accepting. When she returns to Zied for Arianne and Garrett's impending marriage, she entrusts herself to Rua after witnessing her kindness.
Mary (メアリー, Mearī)
A young new serving maid at the Temple who was the only witness of Rua's healing of Garrett, but out of fear of Arianne, she kept it secret. When Garrett is about to be wed with Arianne, she tells him the truth, and after also informing Rua, she quits her job at the Temple to return home, where Sven arranges for her to get a new job with a trustworthy family.
Regiel (レジエル, Rejieru)
The new royal chancellor who replaces his predecessor, Chancellor Sandra, after his daughter Nerne was caught trying to kill Rua. Born into a low-ranking noble family, and despite his youth, he was sponsored by Diana because of his skill needed for his new position. After the High Priest's fall, he is appointed the Temple's administrator.

=== Adversaries ===
Flix Ron-Hearts (フリックス・ロン・ハーツ, Furikkusu Ronhātsu)
Voiced by: Nobuo Tobita
The High Priest of the Temple of Luche. Publicly appearing as a kind and serene person, he secretly plans to seize rulership over the realm, using a Saintess he could control as a puppet figurehead. He was personally responsible for murdering Rua's family after her father spotted Flix talking with the exiled Rosen Shroud, and took Rua in to have her serve as the "plaything" for Arianne, his chosen puppet Saintess. His ultimate plan is to unleash a slow-acting disease on Zied's populace at the kingdom's Founding Day Festival and have Arianne "save" them so he can gain support with the people and then usurp rulership over the kingdom. But his criminal plans are publicly exposed, and after Rua uses her pain touch to punish him, he is apprehended and sentenced to death.
Rosen Shroud (ローゼン・シュラウド, Rōzen Shuraudo)
Also known as the Mad Scientist, Rosen Shroud is a former pharmacist for the Zied royal family. Considering human life nothing more than guinea pigs for his research, he was banished for conducting heinous experiments on healing methods, including the Saintesses' healing power, and how to create poisons to counter them. He was secretly employed by the High Priest for his treasonous plot, and it was he who killed Rua's family, using a poisonous breed of black roses that he cultivated, which, mixed with Arianne's blood, serves as the basis for a slow-acting disease named Black Rose Disease, which only Arianne can cure and which the High Priest intends to use for his takeover plans. Caught by Rua, Sven, Cezee and Lynn, he commits suicide via poison injection, but not before he managed to hide a sample of the Black Rose Disease in the royal palace, where Arianne finds it, but she is stopped by Rua before she can employ it.
Assistant High Priest
Voiced by: Ryoma Masuda
A junior priest at the Temple and Flix's Ron-Hearts' personal assistant, who is the High Priest's confidant in the conspiracy despite his weak nerves.
Ross Dedmond (ロズ・デドモンド, Rozu Dedomondo)
Voiced by: Kohsuke Toriumi
A red-haired, ruggedly handsome nobleman of Zied, and one of the High Priest's fellow conspirators. Though a skilled orator and shrewd diplomat, and despite having a wife and son, he is infamous as the "Womanizing Viscount" for his hedonistic acts of adultery; unknown to the public eye, he has also been raping his female servants. During a ball to celebrate his birthday, Rua lures Dedmond into a trap and forces him to relinquish incriminating documents proving his treason and pay recompense to his victims. After Arianne unleashes a demonic beast at the ball in an attempt to promote her status as future Saintess, but Rua and Sven kill it, Ross is arrested and jailed.
Nerne Sandra (ナーネ・サンドラ, Nāne Sandora)
The daughter of Zied's chancellor, a Saintess candidate and former Rose Princess. She is a bitter loner because of her mother's death and her attraction for dark things. Deluding herself that she and Sven are soulmates, she becomes wildly jealous of Rua. When Rua is nominated as a Rose Princess candidate, Nerne tries to humiliate her into backing down, but Rua refuses to be cowered by her hostility. As such, she is easily persuaded by Arianne to try and kill Rua during her piano performance at the Rose Princess festival. However, she is stopped by Sven and Cezee, and after facing Sven's utter rejection, she and her father, who worked for his own interests instead of the kingdom's welfare and was slated to be replaced anyway, are banished.
Marquess Santalua (サンタルーア侯爵, Santarūa kōshaku)
A middle-aged nobleman who is part of the High Priest's conspiracy. He once supported Rosen Shroud until he realized his true agenda. After the High Priest secretly brings Shroud back to Zied to execute his takeover, Santalua is blackmailed into cooperating when his son is infected with the Black Rose Disease by the scientist. He turns to Sven and Rua to confess all and helps them in publicly exposing the conspiracy in exchange for his son's rescue.

=== Others ===
Luche (ルーチェ, Rūche)
A legendary healer who centuries ago saved Zied from a plague and became the first Saintess of the realm, and later the realm's Goddess of Healing. She is known to have adored roses and playing piano, which caused a Rose Princess holiday to be established in her honor.
The Yuan Tribe
An ethnic minority living in the west part of the continent where Zied is located; hence they are also known as People of the West. They have developed techniques of controlling the demonic beasts living in the wild, and are therefore persuaded by the High Priest in assisting him in his plot.
Lewitt (ルウィット, Rū~itto)
A stray cat living on the palace grounds, who was taken care of by Cezee. When Cezee is absent for a time shadowing the Mad Scientist, the cat attaches itself to Rua. She later names him Lewitt, after her deceased younger brother.

== Media ==
=== Manga ===
Written by Aminohada and illustrated by Sorajima, With Vengeance, Sincerely, Your Broken Saintess was originally released as a webtoon and published online on Piccoma, Mecha Comic and Comico Japan since August 2022. The series was later acquired and published by Ichijinsha under their Comic Lake imprint since March 2024, with four tankōbon volumes released as of October 16, 2026.

The series is published digitally in English on Comico's Pocket Comics website.

| No. | Japanese release date | Japanese ISBN |
|---|---|---|
| 1 | March 28, 2024 | 978-4-7580-1875-3 |
| 2 | September 27, 2024 | 978-4-7580-1932-3 |
| 3 | July 18, 2025 | 978-4-7580-8747-6 |
| 4 | October 16, 2026 | 978-4-8251-0164-7 |

=== Anime ===
A "light anime" television series adaptation was announced on September 27, 2024. It is produced by AnimationID, animated by Imagica Infos and Imageworks Studio, and directed by Chisaki, with onoken composing the music. The series aired from July 10 to September 25, 2025, on tvk and CBC. (Note: tvk listed the series premiere on July 9 at 24:30, which is effectively July 10 at 12:30 a.m. JST.) The opening theme song is "DiZZY", performed by Reina Washio, while the ending theme song is "Abyss" (アビス, Apisu), performed by Nonpy. Medialink licensed the series in South and Southeast Asia for streaming on Ani-One Asia's YouTube channel.

A second season was announced on May 12, 2026, with Saya Fukase replacing Chisaki as director, with the rest of the cast and staff reprising their roles. The season premiered on October 2, 2026. (Note: tvk listed the season premiere on October 1 at 24:00, which is effectively October 2 at midnight JST.) The ending theme song is "Kareinaru Revenger" (華麗なるリベンジャー; 'The Great Revenger'), performed by Juice=Juice.
