= Are You a Landmine, Chihara-san? =

Japanese manga series

- First tankōbon volume cover, featuring Mai Chihara

地雷なんですか？地原さん (Jirai Nandesuka? Chihara-san)
- Genre: Romantic comedy
- Manga
- Written by: Ryon
- Published by: Comic Smart (digital); Ichijinsha (print)
- English publisher: NA: Seven Seas Entertainment
- Magazine: Ganma!
- Original run: June 25, 2021 – present
- Volumes: 9
- Anime television series
- Directed by: Yasuaki Fujii
- Written by: Keiichirō Ōchi
- Music by: Alisa Okehazama
- Studio: SynergySP
- Original network: JNN (MBS, TBS)
- Original run: January 7, 2027 – scheduled
- icon

Are You a Landmine, Chihara-san? (Japanese: 地雷なんですか？地原さん, Hepburn: Jirai Nandesuka? Chihara-san) is a Japanese manga series written and illustrated by Ryon. It began serialization on Comic Smart's Ganma! web service in June 2021, and has been compiled into nine volumes by Ichijinsha as of July 2026. An anime television series adaptation produced by SynergySP is set to premiere in January 2027.

== Plot ==
Kuroki, a second-year high school student, is classmates with Mai Chihara, a student rumored to be a "landmine". One day, Mai appears to develop an interest in him, which makes him conscious given the rumors about her. However, it does not take long for Mai to show her true personality towards him, revealing herself to be a kind girl, despite appearances.

== Characters ==
Kuroki (黒木)
Voiced by: Kazuki Ura (PV, voice comic, anime)
A loner high school boy who sits next to Mai. He has no experience with relationships nor does he have friends. Mai works to befriend him somehow, finding him interesting.
Mai Chihara (地原 舞, Chihara Mai)
Voiced by: Sayumi Suzushiro (PV, voice comic, anime)
Kuroki's classmate. She is a popular student, but due to her appearance and aura, is the subject of rumors in class, leading to her being described as a "landmine". Despite appearing dangerous, she just wants to be friends with Kuroki.
Chinatsu Iwakura (岩倉千夏, Chinatsu Iwakura)
Voiced by: Maaya Uchida (anime)
Hibiya (日比谷)
Voiced by: Tomokazu Sugita (anime)
Kazami (風見)
Voiced by: Daisuke Ono (anime)

== Media ==
=== Manga ===
The series is written and illustrated by Ryon, who began serializing it on Comic Smart's Ganma! web service on June 25, 2021. The first tankōbon volume was released on July 25, 2022; nine volumes have been released by Ichijinsha as of July 24, 2026. The series collaborated with the Vocaloid producer Nanahoshi Orchestra to produce a promotional song, which was released in 2023. A promotional video was released on June 25, 2025, to commemorate the series' fourth anniversary, with Kazuki Ura voicing Kuroki and Sayumi Suzushiro voicing Mai Chihara.

In January 2026, Seven Seas Entertainment announced that they had licensed the series for English publication, with the first volume set to release in September.

No.	Original release date	Original ISBN	English release date	English ISBN
1	July 25, 2022	978-4-7580-2438-9	October 13, 2026	979-8-89863-296-0
2	January 25, 2023	978-4-7580-2487-7	December 15, 2026	979-8-89863-297-7
3	June 26, 2023	9784-7580-2553-9	March 23, 2027	979-8-89863-298-4
4	December 25, 2023	978-4-7580-2629-1	—	—
5	June 25, 2024	978-4-7580-2721-2	—	—
6	December 25, 2024	978-4-7580-2825-7	—	—
7	June 25, 2025	978-4-7580-2923-0	—	—
8	January 7, 2026	978-4-7580-8895-4	—	—
9	July 24, 2026	978-4-8251-0030-5	—	—

=== Anime ===
An anime television series adaptation was announced on December 25, 2025. It will be produced by SynergySP and directed by Yasuaki Fujii, with Keiichirō Ōchi handling series composition, Majiro designing the characters, and Alisa Okehazama composing the music. The series was originally scheduled for 2026, but was later delayed. It is set to premiere on January 7, 2027, on the Super Animeism Turbo programming block on all JNN affiliates, including MBS and TBS.

== Reception ==
The series was nominated for the web category at Next Manga Award in 2023, ultimately ranking 18th.
