= Asami Seto =

Japanese voice actress (born 1993)

- 瀬戸 麻沙美
- Born: April 2, 1993 (age 33); Saitama Prefecture, Japan
- Occupation: Voice actress
- Years active: 2010–present
- Agent: StarCrew

Asami Seto (瀬戸 麻沙美, Seto Asami; born April 2, 1993) is a Japanese voice actress currently affiliated with StarCrew. Her debut role was as Yoshino Takatsuki in Wandering Son, with major roles including Raphtalia in The Rising of the Shield Hero, Mai Sakurajima in the Rascal Does Not Dream series, Asuka Takizawa/Cure Flamingo in Tropical-Rouge! Pretty Cure, Chihaya Ayase in Chihayafuru, Shoko Sashinami in Valvrave the Liberator, Asagi Aiba in Strike the Blood, Mirage Farina Jenius in Macross Delta, Nobara Kugisaki in Jujutsu Kaisen and Konatsu Miyamoto in Tari Tari.

== Filmography ==
=== Anime ===
Year	Title	Role	Notes	Ref.
2011	Anohana: The Flower We Saw That Day	Young Atsumu Matsuyuki		
2011	Chihayafuru	Chihaya Ayase		
2011	Dog Days	Amelita Tremper		
2011	Ro-Kyu-Bu!	Kagetsu Hakamada		
2011	Wandering Son	Yoshino Takatsuki		
2012	Lagrange: The Flower of Rin-ne	Lan		
2012	Magi: The Labyrinth of Magic	Ri Seishun		
2012	Senki Zesshō Symphogear	Aoi Tomosato		
2012	Tari Tari	Konatsu Miyamoto		
2013	Aikatsu!	Raichi Hoshimiya; Shion Kamiya; Mako Miyamoto		
2013	C3-Bu	Rin Haruna		
2013	Chihayafuru 2	Chihaya Ayase		
2013	Cuticle Detective Inaba	Natsuki		
2013	Ro-Kyu-Bu! SS	Kagetsu Hakamada		
2013	Senki Zesshō Symphogear G	Aoi Tomosato		
2013	Strike the Blood	Asagi Aiba		
2013	Valvrave the Liberator	Shōko Sashinami		
2014	Atelier Escha & Logy: Alchemists of the Dusk Sky	Wilbell voll Erslied		
2014	Baby Steps Season 2	Himeko Sasami		
2014	Haikyū!!	Yui Michimiya		
2014	Magical Warfare	Kurumi Isoshima		
2014	Selector Infected WIXOSS	Iona "Yuki" Urasoe		
2014	Witch Craft Works	Ayaka Kagari		
2015	Baby Steps Season 2	Himeko Sasami		
2015	Charlotte	Medoki		
2015	Death Parade	Chiyuki		
2015	Food Wars: Shokugeki no Soma	Miyoko Hōjō		
2015	Monster Musume	Kii		
2015	Overlord	CZ2128 Delta		
2015	Senki Zesshō Symphogear GX	Aoi Tomosato		
2015	Tokyo Ghoul √A	Akira Mado		
2015	Urawa no Usagi-chan	Usagi Takasago		
2015	Valkyrie Drive: Mermaid	Charlotte Scherzen		
2016	Bungo Stray Dogs	Ichiyō Higuchi		
2016	Food Wars: The Second Plate	Miyoko Hōjō		
2016	Haruchika	Naoko Serizawa		
2016	Honobono Log	Various characters		
2016	Kuromukuro	Mika Ogino		
2016	Macross Delta	Mirage Farina Jenius		
2016	Norn9	Nanami Shiranui		
2016	Regalia: The Three Sacred Stars	Ingrid Tiesto		
2017	A Centaur's Life	Rino Kimihara		
2017	Food Wars: The Third Plate	Miyoko Hōjō		
2017	Granblue Fantasy The Animation	Jessica		
2017	Hitorijime My Hero	Kaide-sensei		
2017	Natsume Yuujinchou Roku	Takuma Tsukiko		
2017	Pokémon Sun and Moon	Junsar (Officer Jenny)		
2017	Senki Zesshō Symphogear AXZ	Aoi Tomosato		
2018	Katana Maidens	Yukari Origami		
2018	Kokkoku: Moment by Moment	Shoko Majima		
2018	Lost Song	Allu Lux		
2018	Miss Caretaker of Sunohara-sou	Sumire Yamanashi		
2018	Ongaku Shōjo	Eri Kumagai		
2018	Overlord III	CZ2128 Delta		
2018	Rascal Does Not Dream of Bunny Girl Senpai	Mai Sakurajima		
2018	The Seven Heavenly Virtues	Uriel		
2018	Tokyo Ghoul:re	Akira Mado		
2019	Assassins Pride	Shinhua Tsvetok		
2019	B-Project: Zecchō Emotion	Tsubasa Sumisora		
2019	Bungo Stray Dogs 3	Ichiyō Higuchi		
2019	Chihayafuru 3	Chihaya Ayase		
2019	Isekai Quartet	CZ2128 Delta		
2019	Senki Zesshō Symphogear XV	Aoi Tomosato		
2019	The Magnificent Kotobuki	Leona		
2019	The Rising of the Shield Hero	Raphtalia		
2020	Isekai Quartet 2	CZ2128 Delta, Raphtalia		
2020	Jujutsu Kaisen	Nobara Kugisaki		
2020	My Next Life as a Villainess: All Routes Lead to Doom!	Young Gerald Stuart		
2021	Combatants Will Be Dispatched!	Heine		
2021	Fena: Pirate Princess	Fena Houtman		
2021	Scarlet Nexus	Kasane Randall		
2021	The Idaten Deities Know Only Peace	Pisara		
2021	Tropical-Rouge! Pretty Cure	Asuka Takizawa/Cure Flamingo		
2022	Birdie Wing: Golf Girls' Story	Aoi Amawashi		
2022	Bleach: Thousand-Year Blood War	Shino Madarame		
2022	Extreme Hearts	Ashley Vancroft		
2022	Musasino!	Usagi Takasago		
2022	The Eminence in Shadow	Alpha		
2022	The Rising of the Shield Hero 2	Raphtalia		
2022	Mobile Suit Gundam: The Witch From Mercury	Sabina Fardin		
2023	A Playthrough of a Certain Dude's VRMMO Life	Mina		
2023	A Returner's Magic Should Be Special	Azest Kingscrown		
2023	Birdie Wing: Golf Girls' Story Season 2	Aoi Amawashi		
2023	Bullbuster	Arumi Nikaidō		
2023	Giant Beasts of Ars	Tsurugi		
2023	Jujutsu Kaisen 2nd Season	Nobara Kugisaki		
2023	Oshi no Ko	Frill Shiranui		
2023	Shangri-La Frontier	Setsuna Amatsuki		
2023	Technoroid Overmind	Eliza		
2023	The 100 Girlfriends Who Really, Really, Really, Really, Really Love You	Nano Eiai		
2023	The Café Terrace and Its Goddesses	Akane Hōōji		
2023	The Eminence in Shadow 2nd Season	Alpha		
2023	The Rising of the Shield Hero 3	Raphtalia		
2023	Yuri Is My Job!	Nene Saionji		
2024	Jellyfish Can't Swim in the Night	Koharu		
2024	Kaiju No. 8	Mina Ashiro		
2024	The New Gate	Schnee Raizar		
2024	Whisper Me a Love Song	Yori Asanagi		
2025	Gnosia	Gina		
2025	Kaiju No. 8 Season 2	Mina Ashiro		
2025	May I Ask for One Final Thing?	Scarlet		
2025	My Hero Academia: Vigilantes	Makoto Tsukauchi		
2025	New Saga	Urza		
2025	Ruri Rocks	Nagi Arato		
2025	The Apothecary Diaries 2nd Season	Loulan / Shisui		
2025	The Rising of the Shield Hero 4	Raphtalia		
2025	The Unaware Atelier Master	Yulicia		
2025	With Vengeance, Sincerely, Your Broken Saintess	Rua Restoat		
2026	Nippon Sangoku	Saki Higashimachi		
2026	A Livid Lady's Guide to Getting Even	Roselia Fadogal		
2026	I Want to Love You Till Your Dying Day	Seiran Lidsey		
2026	FX Fighter Kurumi-chan	Mochiko Kogane		
2026	Overgeared	Yura		
2026	Tetsuryō! Meet with Tetsudō Musume	Sakie Ashio		

=== Anime films ===
Year	Title	Role	Notes	Ref.
2013	Death Billiards	Chiyuki		
2015	Girls und Panzer der Film	Kinuyo Nishi		
2015	Ongaku Shōjo	Eri Kumagai		
2015	The Laws of The Universe Part 0	Anna		
2016	Pop In Q	Isumi Kominato		
2016	Selector Destructed WIXOSS	Iona "Yuki" Urasoe		
2017	Haikara-san ga Tōru	Tamaki Kitakōji		
2018	Macross Delta the Movie: Passionate Walküre	Mirage Farina Jenius		
2019	Rascal Does Not Dream of a Dreaming Girl	Mai Sakurajima		
2020	Date A Live Fragment: Date A Bullet	Yui Sagakure		
2021	Eureka - Eureka Seven: Hi-Evolution	Ex Tora		
2021	Macross Delta the Movie: Absolute Live!!!!!!	Mirage Farina Jenius		
2022	Drifting Home	Natsume Tonai		
2022	The First Slam Dunk	Ayako		
2023	Rascal Does Not Dream of a Sister Venturing Out	Mai Sakurajima		
2023	Rascal Does Not Dream of a Knapsack Kid	Mai Sakurajima		
2025	Crayon Shin-chan the Movie: Super Hot! The Spicy Kasukabe Dancers	Ariana		
2026	Rascal Does Not Dream of a Dear Friend	Mai Sakurajima		

=== Original video animation (OVA) ===
Year	Title	Role	Notes	Ref.
2012	Code Geass: Akito the Exiled	Ferirri Baltrow		
2012–21	Hori-san to Miyamura-kun	Kyoko Hori		
2016	Under the Dog	Anthea Kallenberg		
2016–17	Strike the Blood II	Asagi Aiba		
2017	Mobile Suit Gundam: The Origin	Fan Li		
2018–19	Strike the Blood III	Asagi Aiba		
2020–21	Strike the Blood IV	Asagi Aiba		
2022	Strike the Blood V	Asagi Aiba		

=== Original net animation (ONA) ===
Year	Title	Role	Notes	Ref.
2013	Double Circle	Akane		
2018	B: The Beginning	Lily Hoshina		
2021	B: The Beginning Succession	Lily Hoshina		
2021	Ganbare Dōki-chan	Senpai-san		
2021	Star Wars: Visions - The Village Bride	F		
2022	Thermae Romae Novae	Mami Yamaguchi		
2023	Yakitori: Soldiers of Misfortune	Zi Han Yan		
2023	Bastard!! Season 2	Shella E. Lee		
2025	Bullet/Bullet	Noa		
2026	Yu-Gi-Oh! Card Game The Chronicles	Diabellstar		

=== Video games ===
Year	Title	Role	Notes	Ref.
2010	Chaos Rings	Alto		
2012	Atelier Ayesha: The Alchemist of Dusk	Wilbell voll Erslied		
2012	E.X. Troopers	Suage		
2012	Street Fighter X Tekken	Lili		
2013	Atelier Escha & Logy: Alchemists of the Dusk Sky	Wilbell voll Erslied		
2013	NORN9	Shiranui Nanami		
2013	Corpse Party 2: Dead Patient	Ayame Itou		
2014	Atelier Shallie: Alchemists of the Dusk Sea	Wilbell voll Erslied		
2014	Tales of Link	Kana		
2014	Shining Resonance	Sonia Blanche		
2015	Granblue Fantasy	Jessica		
2015	Grand Sphere	Princess Stella		
2015	7th Dragon III Code: VFD	Rika		
2017	Kantai Collection	Gangut, Kamoi		
2017	Fire Emblem Heroes	Linde		
2017	Magia Record: Puella Magi Madoka Magica Side Story	Asuka Tatsuki		
2017	Azur Lane	FNFF Saint Louis and SN Sovetskaya Belorussiya		
2018	Toaru Majutsu no Virtual On	Othinus		
2018	Girls' Frontline	Contender and IWS 2000		
2018	Schoolgirl Strikers 2	Aoi Uraba		
2019	Another Eden	Hisumena		
2019	A Certain Magical Index: Imaginary Fest	Othinus		
2020	Arknights	Ceobe		
2020	TOUHOU Spell Bubble	Alice Margatroid		
2021	Scarlet Nexus	Kasane Randall		
2021	Granblue Fantasy	Azusa		
2021	Genshin Impact	Kujou Sara		
2021	Dead or Alive Xtreme Venus Vacation	Elise		
2021	Blue Archive	Hasumi Hanekawa		
2022	Eve: Ghost Enemies	Lisa		
2022	Ghostwire: Tokyo	Mari		
2022	Heaven Burns Red	Saki Tezuka		
2023	Fate/Grand Order	Kashin Koji		
2023	Path to Nowhere	Corso		
2023	Snowbreak: Containment Zone	Lyfe		
2024	Tekken 8	Reina		
2024	Jujutsu Kaisen: Cursed Clash	Nobara Kugisaki		
2024	Wuthering Waves	Baizhi		
2024	Stellar Blade	Eve		
2025	Venus Vacation Prism: Dead or Alive Xtreme	Elise		
2025	Goddess of Victory: NIKKE	Eve		
2026	Azur Lane	Elise	Dead or Alive Xtreme Venus Vacation collaboration	
2026	Nekopara: Sekai Connect	Mayumi		
2026	Fatal Fury: City of the Wolves	Reina		
2026	Arknights: Endfield	Kay		
2027	Romancing SaGa 3: Destinies United	Katarina Lauran		

=== Dubbing ===
==== Live-action ====
Year	Title	Role	Notes	Ref.
2014	The 100	Clarke Griffin	Originally played by Eliza Taylor	
2015	Paper Towns	Lacey Pemberton	Originally played by Halston Sage	
2015	Goosebumps	Hannah	Originally played by Odeya Rush	
2017	El Camino Christmas	Kate Daniels	Originally played by Michelle Mylett	
2017	Going in Style	Brooklyn Harding	Originally played by Joey King	
2018	Bad Times at the El Royale	Emily Summerspring	Originally played by Dakota Johnson	
2019	Annabelle Comes Home	Mary Ellen	Originally played by Madison Iseman	
2020	Dolittle	Queen Victoria	Originally played by Jessie Buckley	
2021	The Conjuring: The Devil Made Me Do It	Debbie Glatzel	Originally played by Sarah Catherine Hook	
2021	Gossip Girl	Luna La	Originally played by Zión Moreno	
2021	The Lost Daughter	Young Leda Caruso	Originally played by Jessie Buckley	
2022	Pearl	Mitsy	Originally played by Emma Jenkins-Purro	
2022	Talk to Me	Jade	Originally played by Alexandra Jensen	
2023	Knights of the Zodiac	Marin the Eagle Knight	Originally played by Caitlin Hutson	
2024	Twisters	Lilly	Originally played by Sasha Lane	
2024	Venom: The Last Dance	Echo Moon	Originally played by Hala Finley	
2025	Back to the Future (2025 NTV edition)	Jennifer Parker	Originally played by Claudia Wells	
2025	Back to the Future Part II (2025 NTV edition)	Jennifer Parker	Originally played by Elisabeth Shue	
2025	Back to the Future Part III (2025 NTV edition)	Jennifer Parker	Originally played by Elisabeth Shue	
2026	Primate	Lucy Pinborough	Originally played by Johnny Sequoyah	

==== Animation ====
Year	Title	Role	Notes	Ref.
2019	Carmen Sandiego	Carmen Sandiego	Originally played by Gina Rodriguez	
