= Technoroid =

Japanese mixed-media project

テクノロイド (Tekunoroido)
- Created by: Noriyasu Agematsu; RUCCA; CyberAgent; Avex Pictures; Elements Garden
- Video game

Technoroid Unison Heart
- Developer: WonderPlanet
- Publisher: CyberAgent
- Genre: Puzzle video game, Adventure game
- Platform: Android, iOS
- Released: JP: January 21, 2022
- Anime television series

Technoroid Overmind
- Directed by: Ka Hee Im
- Written by: Ayumi Sekine
- Music by: Elements Garden; RUCCA
- Studio: Doga Kobo
- Licensed by: Crunchyroll
- Original network: TV Tokyo, TVO
- Original run: January 5, 2023 – March 30, 2023
- Episodes: 12
- Manga

Technoroid Overmind
- Written by: Ageha Saotome
- Published by: AlphaPolis
- Original run: January 5, 2023 – November 2, 2023
- Volumes: 1

Technoroid (テクノロイド, Tekunoroido) is a Japanese mixed-media project created by Noriyasu Agematsu, RUCCA, CyberAgent, Avex Pictures, and Elements Garden. A mobile game developed by WonderPlanet titled Technoroid Unison Heart was released on January 21, 2022, for Android and iOS, and an anime television series by Doga Kobo titled Technoroid Overmind aired from January to March 2023.

== Characters ==
=== KNoCC ===
Cobalt (コバルト, Kobaruto)
Voiced by: Kazuki Ura
Chrom (クロム, Kuromu)
Voiced by: Satoi Shibuya
Kei (ケイ)
Voiced by: Hiromu Mineta
Neon (ネオン)
Voiced by: kayto

=== Stand-Alone ===
Kite (カイト, Kaito)
Voiced by: Makoto Furukawa
Light (ライト, Raito)
Voiced by: Keigo Hagiya
Night (ナイト, Naito)
Voiced by: Gakuto Kajiwara

=== Mechanicametallica ===
Silve (シルバ, Shiruba)
Voiced by: Junya Enoki
Auru (アウル)
Voiced by: Takeo Ōtsuka
Lana (ラナ, Rana)
Voiced by: Akito Sugibayashi
Zin (ジン, Jin)
Voiced by: Shugo Nakamura

=== Others ===
Esora Shibaura (芝浦 エソラ, Shibaura Esora)
Voiced by: Mutsumi Tamura
Eliza (エリザ, Eriza)
Voiced by: Asami Seto
Bora (ボーラ)
Voiced by: Daiki Hamano
Nobel (ノーベル, Nōberu)
Voiced by: Kenji Nojima
Hakushū Shibaura (芝浦 白秋, Shibaura Hakushū)
Voiced by: Takuya Kirimoto

== Production and release ==
The mixed-media project by Noriyasu Agematsu, RUCCA, CyberAgent, Avex Pictures, and Elements Garden was announced on November 2, 2021, with a mobile game developed by WonderPlanet titled Technoroid Unison Heart (テクノロイド ユニゾンハート, Tekunoroido Yunizon Hāto) released on January 21, 2022, for Android and iOS, as well as an anime television series by Doga Kobo titled Technoroid Overmind (テクノロイド オーバーマインド, Tekunoroido Ōbāmaindo). Ka Hee Im is directing the series, with Ai Yoshimura supervising, Ayumi Sekine penning the series' scripts, Saori Sakiguchi designing the characters based on the original designs by LAM, and Elements Garden and RUCCA composing the series' music. It was initially scheduled for July 2022, but was later delayed as Doga Kobo was temporarily closed due to an increase of COVID-19 infections among its staff members. The series aired from January 5 to March 30, 2023, on TV Tokyo and other networks. The opening theme song is "Love No Hate" by KNoCC, while the ending theme song is "Invisible -one heart-" by KNoCC and Stand-Alone. Crunchyroll licensed the series.

A manga adaptation by Ageha Saotome was also serialized on the AlphaPolis service on January 5 to November 2, 2023. Its chapters were compiled into a single tankōbon volume on November 30, 2023.
