= Kazuki Ura =

Japanese voice actor (born 1995)

- 浦 和希
- Born: 18 October 1995 (age 31); Osaka Prefecture, Japan
- Occupation: Voice actor
- Years active: 2018–present
- Notable work: Futsal Boys!!!!! as Kyōsuke Aiba; World's End Harem as Shōta Doi; Blue Lock as Yoichi Isagi; Technoroid as Cobalt; My Daughter Left the Nest and Returned an S-Rank Adventurer as Byaku

Kazuki Ura (Japanese: 浦 和希, Hepburn: Ura Kazuki; born 18 October 1995) is a Japanese voice actor. He is affiliated with VIMS. He is known for voicing Kyōsuke Aiba in Futsal Boys!!!!!, Shōta Doi in World's End Harem, Yoichi Isagi in Blue Lock, Cobalt in Technoroid, and Byaku in My Daughter Left the Nest and Returned an S-Rank Adventurer.

== Biography ==
Ura, a native of Osaka Prefecture, was born on 18 October 1995. While in junior high school, he was a trombonist for their brass band. While struggling in high school, he was impressed by Misato Fukuen's portrayal of Yoshika Miyafuji, the main character of Strike Witches. He had originally planned to be a game creator while in college before deciding to become a voice actor. He later enrolled in Japan Narration Acting Institute.

In 2019, he starred in his first regular role as Tsuchiya in Dimension High School after unsuccessfully auditioning for the series' animated part. In February 2020, Ura was cast as Kyōsuke Aiba in Futsal Boys!!!!!. In September 2020, he was cast as Kazuhiko Satō in Tasūketsu: Judgement Assizes. In June 2021, he was cast as Shōta Doi in World's End Harem. In August 2021, he was cast as Yoichi Isagi in Blue Lock. He was announced as part of the cast of the Technoroid multimedia project in November 2021. In January 2022, he was cast as Subaru Makabe in Shadowverse Flame. In August 2023, he voiced Byaku in My Daughter Left the Nest and Returned an S-Rank Adventurer and Falk in Undead Girl Murder Farce. Ura won the Best Leading Actor Award at the 18th Seiyu Awards.

Ura has four brothers, two of whom are older than him.

== Filmography ==
=== Anime series ===
2018

- Golden Kamuy, soldiers
- Tada Never Falls in Love, student
- Shuudengo, Capsule Hotel de, Joushi ni Binetsu Tsutawaru Yoru, male staff

2019

- Ahiru no Sora, new Marutaka Club member, Nishiwaki's minion
- Dimension High School, gardening club member
- Do You Love Your Mom and Her Two-Hit Multi-Target Attacks?

2020

- Smile Down the Runway, Far Patterner A
- Yu-Gi-Oh! Sevens, Osamu Rojihara, chorus group

2021

- Don't Toy with Me, Miss Nagatoro, man
- Full Dive, Tatsuya Moriguchi
- Tasūketsu: Judgement Assizes, Kazuhiko Satō

2022

- World's End Harem, Shōta Doi
- Blue Lock, Yoichi Isagi
- Futsal Boys!!!!!, Kyōsuke Aiba
- Shadowverse Flame, Subaru Makabe

2023

- Blue Orchestra, Ben
- Bungo Stray Dogs, Senior Escort Officer B, young Fukuchi Ōchi
- KamiErabi God.app, Goro
- Kuma Kuma Kuma Bear, Barbold
- My Daughter Left the Nest and Returned an S-Rank Adventurer, Byaku
- Technoroid Overmind, Cobalt
- Undead Girl Murder Farce, Falk

2024

- A Journey Through Another World, Granvault Lowain
- Shinkalion: Change the World, Yamato Nishiōji
- Tasūketsu, Ryūta Ichinose
- Wistoria: Wand and Sword, Gordon Valley

2025

- Anyway, I'm Falling in Love with You, Kizuki Hazawa
- Gachiakuta, Follo
- May I Ask for One Final Thing?, Sigurd Forgrave
- The Water Magician, Abel
- Tougen Anki, Shiki Ichinose
- Wind Breaker Season 2, Uryū Sakaki
- With Vengeance, Sincerely, Your Broken Saintess, Garrett Vance
- Zenshu, Luke Braveheart

2026

- Champignon Witch, Wind Mage
- Daemons of the Shadow Realm, Haruo Kuroya
- Sparks of Tomorrow, Yajiro Yagura
- Spirit Circle, Fuuta Okeya
- Super Psychic Policeman Chojo, Heisuke Ban
- The Classroom of a Black Cat and a Witch, Chiron Sagittarius Aradia
- The Vermilion Mask, Mok Sharib
- Vertex Force, Alan

2027

- Are You a Landmine, Chihara-san?, Kuroki
- Otherworldly Munchkin: Let's Speedrun the Dungeon with Only 1 HP!, Yukito Kirihara
- KuKu-Loop: The 100th Time's the Charm, Lionett

=== Original net animation (ONA) ===
2024

- Gundam: Requiem for Vengeance, Gundam Pilot
- Gokurakugai (advertisement for volume 4), Alma

=== Video games ===
2010s

- Grand Chase, King Imp, Pepe

2020

- Monster Strike, Rezan, Break
- Tom Clancy's Ghost Recon Breakpoint, Gregor, Private Robert, others

2021

- Futsal Boys!!!!! High-Five League, Kyōsuke Aiba

2022

- Technoroid Unison Heart, Cobalt

2026

- Kyoto Xanadu, Shu Kadenokoji

=== Dubbing ===
- Kingdom of the Planet of the Apes, Anaya
