= May I Ask for One Final Thing? =

Japanese light novel series and its adaptations

- First light novel volume cover

最後にひとつだけお願いしてもよろしいでしょうか (Saigo ni Hitotsu dake Onegai Shitemo Yoroshī Deshō ka)
- Genre: Action; Fantasy comedy
- Novel series
- Written by: Nana Ōtori
- Published by: AlphaPolis
- Original run: April 10, 2018 – October 1, 2026
- Light novel
- Written by: Nana Ōtori
- Illustrated by: Satsuki
- Published by: AlphaPolis
- Imprint: Regina Books
- Original run: August 6, 2018 – present
- Volumes: 7
- Manga
- Written by: Nana Ōtori
- Illustrated by: Sora Hōnoki
- Published by: AlphaPolis
- English publisher: Alpha Manga
- Imprint: Regina Comics
- Magazine: Regina
- Original run: June 5, 2019 – present
- Volumes: 11
- Anime television series
- Directed by: Kazuya Sakamoto
- Written by: Deko Akao
- Music by: Hinako Tsubakiyama
- Studio: Liden Films Kyoto Studio
- Licensed by: Crunchyroll: SEA: Muse Communication
- Original network: Tokyo MX, BS11, GTV, GYT, MBS, Chukyo TV, AT-X
- Original run: October 4, 2025 – December 27, 2025
- Episodes: 13
- icon

May I Ask for One Final Thing? (Japanese: 最後にひとつだけお願いしてもよろしいでしょうか, Hepburn: Saigo ni Hitotsu dake Onegai Shitemo Yoroshī Deshō ka) is a Japanese light novel series written by Nana Ōtori and illustrated by Satsuki. Originally published online since April 2018, AlphaPolis have published six volumes of the series since August 2018 under their Regina Books imprint. A manga adaptation illustrated by Sora Hōnoki began serialization online via AlphaPolis' Regina manga website in June 2019 and has been collected in ten tankōbon volumes. The manga is published digitally in English through Alpha Manga. An anime television series adaptation produced by Liden Films Kyoto Studio aired from October to December 2025.

== Premise ==
After Scarlet's cruel and selfish fiancé suddenly ends their engagement and falsely accuses her of being a bully and villainess, she finally snaps and begins committing violent revenge against him and his allies, exposing him as a corrupt noble himself, and getting him disowned and disinherited. Before long, she finds herself at war against corrupt nobles, some who seek to either use or kill her, including a cult that worship the evil goddess of love, Palmia.

== Characters ==
Scarlet El Vandimion (スカーレット・エル・ヴァンディミオン, Sukāretto Eru Vandimion)
Voiced by: Asami Seto (Japanese); Morgan Lauré (English)
The daughter of Duke Vandimion and ex-fiancée to Kyle von Pallistan, the second prince of the Kingdom of Pallistan. Despite her skills in magic and armed combat, she prefers to beat her targets bare-handed. She also has the ability to manipulate time, granted by Chronoa the time God.
Julius von Pallistan (ジュリアス ・フォン・パリスタン, Juriasu fon Parisutan)
Voiced by: Wataru Katoh (Japanese); Reagan Murdock (English)
The first prince of the Kingdom of Pallistan. He develops a connection with Scarlet.
Leonardo El Vandimion (レオナルド・エル・ヴァンディミオン, Reonarudo Eru Vandimion)
Voiced by: Shōya Ishige (Japanese); Alex Hom, Nia Celeste (child) (English)
Scarlet's older brother as well as Julius' attendant and best friend. He is a founder of the Crown Investigatory Office.
Nanaka (ナナカ)
Voiced by: Miyu Tomita (Japanese); Lexi Nieto (English)
A young spy and slave for Godwin, who was sent to pose as a maid for House Vandimion. Nanaka is a male beastkin who is often confused as a girl due to his androgynous figure and gender-neutral name.
Sigurd Forgrave (シグルド・フォーグレイブ, Shigurudo Fōgureibu)
Voiced by: Kazuki Ura (Japanese); Kieran Flitton (English)
Prince Julius' attendant, often sent by the prince to spy and gather information in the kingdom. He is a member of the Crown Investigatory Office.
Kyle von Pallistan (カイル・フォン・パリスタン, Kairu fon Parisutan)
Voiced by: Taito Ban (Japanese); Kyle Igneczi, Lara Woodhull (child) (English)
One of the main antagonists of the story. He is the second prince of the Kingdom of Pallistan and Scarlet's abusive former fiancé. After being approached and charmed by Terenezza, he publicly broke off his engagement to Scarlet.
Terenezza Hopkins (テレネッツァ・ホプキンス, Terenettsa Hopukinsu)
Voiced by: Ai Kakuma (Japanese); Emily Neves (English)
One of the main antagonists of the story.
Rosalia Ley Madeleine (ローザリア, Rōzaria)
Voiced by: Sally Amaki (Japanese); Krystal LaPorte (English)
One of Scarlet of House Vandaimion's closest friends in the academy.
Godwin Bene Carmine (ゴド ウィン, Godōin)
Voiced by: Hiroshi Yanaka
The leader of Pallistan's most corrupt nobles. He is Kyle's tutor and the prime minister of the fief.
Junk
An unseen character who has connections to Godwin and the domain's criminal underground.
Heine Bene Carmine
Voiced by: Souhei Horikane (Japanese); Aaron Roberts (English)
The son of Prime Minister Godwin and an attendant to the Second Prince Kyle Von Palistan.
Lord Zatharin
Voiced by: Nobuo Tobita (Japanese); Randy Pearlman (English)
The owner of a slave auction.
Donovan
Voiced by: Kaito Muroi (Japanese); Cris George (English)
Zatharin's slave trainer. He is very hot-tempered.
Palmia
The Goddess of Love, who gifted Terenezza with her powers and a powerful pistol. She has a crush on Chronoa. She is a main antagonist.
Alflame Rare Vankish (アルフレイム・レア・ヴァンキッシュ, Arufureimu Rare Buankisshu)
Voiced by: Yoshimasa Hosoya (Japanese); Ryan Negron (English)
An assassin prince from the Vankish Empire. He was hired by Godwin to kill Scarlet, but develops a crush on Scarlet after fighting her for the first time. He has the blessing of Metallization bestowed upon him by Meteorr, the God of steel.
Rex
Alflame's pet dragon.
Jinn (ゴド ウィン, Jin)
Voiced by: Shun Horie
Alflame's loyal assistant.
Chronoa (クロノワ, Kuronowa)
Voiced by: Jun Fukuyama
The God of Time, who granted Scarlet and Diana their powers.
Diana (ディアナ, Diana)
Voiced by: Kaori Maeda (Japanese); Jad Saxton (English)
A young Saint who wields powerful magic that can banish evil. Her birth name is Sanya. She looks up to Scarlet and loves her like a sister, is resentful towards Julius, and gains a deep crush on Scarlet's brother Leonardo.
Envi (エンヴィ, Enbi)
Voiced by: Hina Tachibana (Japanese); Rebecca Danae (English)
Another of Scarlet's friends, who can use magic.
Jarmov
Voiced by: Shinpachi Tsuji
A Palmian inquisitor who wields a magical mace and a Palmian pendant that he got from Palmia.
Sargon (ゴド ウィン, Sarugon)
Voiced by: Yutaka Aoyama
A Palmian pope who built the Wall of Impurity to protect the Holy Lands' two churches.
Paragas (ゴド ウィン, Paragasu)
Voiced by: Hinata Tadokoro (Japanese); Jason Douglas (English)
The leader of the Holy Order of Diana.
Dios Westwood (ディオス・ウエストウッド, Diosu Uesutouddo)
Voiced by: Jin Ogasawara (Japanese); Joshua Waters (English)
A half-elf who is a member of the Holy Order of Diana.
Catarl
Voiced by: Bin Shimada
A Palmian inquisitor who also possesses a Palmian pendant.
Michelin (ミシェラン, Mishuran)
Voiced by: Hiroshi Naka (Japanese); R. Bruce Elliott (English)
An elderly Palmian inquisitor. He can wield powerful magic.
Isabella (ゴド ウィン, Izabera)
Voiced by: Yoko Hikasa
Known as Isabella the Disciplinarian, she is a Palmian inquisitor who fights with a whip.
Teresa Himemiya
Terenezza's original self, whom Palmia reincarnated to take down Diana and Scarlet.
Count Padrack
Voiced by: Yōji Ueda (Japanese); Christopher Wehkamp (English)
A Palmian count who resents Diana.
Avelyn and Barrock
Two Palmian Inquisitors, who can both use magic as well as fight.
Mitch
Voiced by: Shinsuke Sugawara (Japanese); Van Barr Jr. (English)
A soldier who works for Alflame. He was captured by the Orc Lord, but was saved by Scarlet.
Orc Lord
Voiced by: Tomokazu Sugita (Japanese); Chris Guerrero (English)
The leader of the orcs, who can speak the human language.

== Media ==
=== Light novel ===
No.	Release date	ISBN
1	August 6, 2018	978-4-434-24925-9
2	December 3, 2018	978-4-434-25375-1
3	April 5, 2023	978-4-434-31786-6
4	February 5, 2024	978-4-434-33147-3
5	October 5, 2024	978-4-434-34529-6
6	July 10, 2025	978-4-434-35969-9
7	December 10, 2025	978-4-434-36820-2

=== Manga ===
A manga adaptation illustrated by Sora Hōnoki began serialization on AlphaPolis' Regina manga website on June 5, 2019, which its chapters have been collected in eleven tankōbon volumes as of December 2025. The series was originally published only digitally in English on AlphaPolis' Alpha Manga app, before later publishing the English version physically starting in 2026.

No.	Original release date	Original ISBN	North American release date	North American ISBN
1	March 5, 2020	978-4-434-27024-6	March 31, 2023 (digital); April 7, 2026 (print)	979-8-9933-4760-8
2	November 5, 2020	978-4-434-28015-3	March 31, 2023 (digital); June 9, 2026 (print)	979-8-9933-4761-5
3	April 5, 2021	978-4-434-28679-7	March 31, 2023 (digital); August 4, 2026 (print)	979-8-9933-4762-2
4	September 5, 2021	978-4-434-29284-2	August 25, 2023 (digital)	—
5	April 5, 2022	978-4-434-30104-9	December 22, 2023 (digital)	—
6	October 5, 2022	978-4-434-30894-9	April 26, 2024 (digital)	—
7	April 5, 2023	978-4-434-31776-7	August 23, 2024 (digital)	—
8	December 31, 2023	978-4-434-33140-4	December 20, 2024 (digital)	—
9	October 5, 2024	978-4-434-34076-5	September 26, 2025 (digital)	—
10	October 10, 2025	978-4-434-36456-3	November 28, 2025 (digital)	—
11	December 10, 2025	978-4-434-36823-3	—	—

=== Anime ===
An anime television series adaptation was announced during the Aniplex Online Fest event on September 16, 2024. It is produced by Liden Films Kyoto Studio and directed by Kazuya Sakamoto, with Deko Akao writing series scripts, Eriko Haga designing the characters, and Hinako Tsubakiyama composing the music. The series aired from October 4 to December 27, 2025, on Tokyo MX and other networks. (Note: Tokyo MX and BS11 listed the series premiere on October 3 at 24:00, which is effectively October 4 at midnight JST.) The opening theme song is "Senjō no Hana" (戦場の華; 'Flower of the Battlefield'), performed by CHICO with HoneyWorks, while the ending theme song is "Inferior" (インフェリア, Inferia), performed by Shiyui. Crunchyroll streamed the series. Muse Communication licensed the series in Southeast Asia.

==== Episodes ====
No.	Title	Directed by	Written by	Storyboarded by	Original release date
1	"May I Kindly Beat the Tar Out of Those Evil Nobles (Pigs)?"; Transliteration: "Akutoku Kizoku (Buta Yarō-tachi) o Omōzonbun Bokoboko ni shite Sukatu Toshite mo Yoroshīdeshō ka" (Japanese: 悪徳貴族（豚野郎達）を思う存分ボコボコにしてスカッとしてもよろしいでしょうか)	Kazuya Sakamoto	Deko Akao	Kazuya Sakamoto	October 4, 2025
Scarlet is publicly dumped by her fiancé Second Prince Kyle of Pallistan Kingdom so he can marry Terenezza Hopkins, who claimed that Scarlet bullied her for years at the academy, though without any shreds of evidence. Scarlet accepts his wishes and asks for one last favor, which Terenezza (who is actually sinister on the inside) spitefully allows. They are both shocked when Scarlet reveals her repressed, sadistic personality and asks to be allowed to beat Terenezza with her bare hands. In a flashback, Scarlet explains she has always enjoyed using violence against those who deserve it, but was forced to repress her urges after becoming engaged to Kyle, even though he was a petty bully that took joy in torturing others he saw as beneath him. Growing up, Scarlet has been subject to Kyle's verbal, physical and psychological abuse, which only chipped away at her composure and sanity more and more. The only one to stand up to Kyle on Scarlet's behalf was his older brother Julius, who not only sensed that Scarlet was capable of killing Kyle, but also began harmlessly tormenting her himself, hoping to see her true personality in action. After years of this treatment, Scarlet finally loses her temper. After viciously punching Terenezza in the face, she puts the innocent palace guards to sleep with magic and proceeds to beat every worthless corrupt noble present, saving the worst beating for Kyle, whom she almost kills. Her brother Leonardo is stunned by the enormity of her actions, while Julius finds it hilariously funny.
2	"May I Offer You the Taste of My Fist as the Ladylike Thing to Do?"; Transliteration: "Shukujo Rashiku, Watashi no Kobushi o Ajiwattemimasen ka?" (Japanese: 淑女らしく、私の拳を味わってみませんか？)	Kazunari Araki	Deko Akao	Kazuya Sakamoto	October 11, 2025 (Note: From Episode 2, episodes are released on Prime Video, Crunchyroll and simulcast platforms by Muse a week before their televised airings.)
Julius is thrilled to see Scarlet's true personality, but she passes out due to overuse of her time manipulation magic. She wakes up three days later just in time to thwart an assassination attempt by her maid Nanaka. Julius and Leonardo then arrive, explaining that they have formed a special group called the Crown Investigatory Office (CIO) dedicated to removing corruption from the government, with Kyle also being part of it. It turns out Scarlet's actions had a positive effect on the townsfolks since the nobles she had beaten up are wicked people. They further explain that Prime Minister Godwin Bene Carmine is the ringleader behind the corrupt nobles who were supporting Kyle, and he is currently being investigated by the CIO on suspicion of running a slavery ring. They bring in an agent named Sigurd Forgave, who is actually a spy ordered to investigate Kyle, to help with the investigation. Scarlet interrogates Nanaka, finding out that she is actually a male beastkin in disguise, who unsuccessfully tries to kill her again. Scarlet discovers that he has been enslaved by Godwin and uses her time magic to remove his enslavement crest, but also forces him to not tell anyone about her magic. It turns out Godwin ordered him to kill Scarlet as revenge for harming his son, who was one of the corrupt nobles at the party. Deciding to help her in gratitude, Nanaka divulges information about Godwin, and helps Scarlet and Julius head to the slums. After defeating some thugs and interrogating a man named Junk, Scarlet obtains information on where the next slave auction will be held so they can catch Godwin in the act.
3	"I Considered A Negotiated Resolution, But May I Biff and Pow Those Noblemen Instead?"; Transliteration: "Chanto Hanashiai de Kaiketsu Shiyō to Omoimashitaga, Yahari Bonbokobonboko Jōi Kizoku o Nagutte mo Yoroshīdeshō ka" (Japanese: ちゃんと話し合いで解決しようと思いましたが、やはりボンボコボンボコ上位貴族を殴ってもよろしいでしょうか)	Daiki Handa	Deko Akao	Hayato Sakoda	October 18, 2025
Scarlet meets with Lord Zatharin in order to secure an invitation to the slave auction. Zatharin is willing to allow Scarlet to attend the auction, but only under the condition she hand over Nanaka. Having already planned for this, Scarlet agrees to hand Nanaka over to earn Zatharin's trust. Scarlet takes Nanaka back to the inn to rest while they wait for Zatharin to make his preparations, and Julius accompanies Scarlet to the local market where he buys various gifts for her. He then confides in Scarlet that he personally finds much of the world extremely boring, so he has dedicated himself to collecting anything that garners his interest. He continues that when he met Scarlet as a child, he could immediately tell that she was not like any other noble girl, and he has been drawn to her ever since. Even though he doesn't hold traditional romantic feelings, he still considers Scarlet as his most precious person, leaving Scarlet confused and slightly unsettled. Scarlet then meets Zatharin again to formally hand over Nanaka to him, but when she sees Zatharin's slave trainer Donovan mistreating Nanaka, she promptly punches him out of the building. This convinces Zatharin to comply with Scarlet's demands. After learning the time and place of the auction, Scarlet is picked up by Leonardo, who is upset Scarlet got herself involved, but she explains that after leaving her sheltered lifestyle and witnessing how normal people live in the kingdom, she is determined to punish those who would exploit them. Meanwhile, Godwin hires a soldier from Vankish Empire to assassinate Scarlet, while Terenezza, having abandoned the now-disgraced Kyle and shown her true colors, boasts to him that she was gifted a pistol from the Goddess Palmia, which should also have the power to kill Scarlet.
4	"May I Go To See My Fists' Beloved One (Punching Bag)?"; Transliteration: "Ken no Omoi Hito (Sando Baggu) ni Ai ni Itte mo Yoroshīdeshō ka" (Japanese: 拳の想い人（サンドバッグ）に会いに行ってもよろしいでしょうか)	Misato Takada & Hoshinogo Gohan	Deko Akao	Misato Takada	October 25, 2025
Scarlet attends the auction with Julius. Leonardo and the royal knights wait for the signal to attack. Julius promises to let Scarlet beat up Godwin in exchange for a personal vow, which Scarlet grudgingly gives. In the dungeon, Nanaka comforts the slave children. Scarlet makes her way to Godwin and his son Heine and instigates a brawl, beating up as many corrupt nobles as she can find. Leonardo arrives to apprehend the nobles and uses his Clairvoyance skill to locate Godwin trying to escape with Heine to the roof, where his Vankish assassin Alflame waits to retrieve them. Scarlet races to the roof in time to stop Alflame from killing Godwin and Heine. Coming from a warrior culture, Alflame is amazed by her and proposes marriage, so Scarlet punches him, then beats up his dragon Rex. Scarlet determines that he is the Vankish crown prince, and that his actual assassination target was Godwin to cover up his relationship with the Vankish Kingdom. Scarlet saves Godwin and duels Alflame, whose God blessing Metallization means his body can never be physically harmed. Alflame is even more enamored of her and fails to notice her repeated blows to his head are giving him a concussion until he is unable to stand, after which she throws him off the roof. Desperate to avoid a beating, Godwin admits that aided Terenezza in her plot to marry Kyle and humiliate Scarlet in front of her kingdom. Furthermore, he reveals that Terenezza is actually a reincarnation of a person from another world, which leaves Scarlet puzzled.
5	"May I Clobber this Asshole Prince?"; Transliteration: "Kuso Ōji o Butu Tobashite mo Yoroshīdeshō ka" (Japanese: クソ王子をブッ飛ばしてもよろしいでしょうか)	Moe Ōnishi	Fūka Ishii	Misato Takada	November 1, 2025
As the slaves are rescued, Scarlet decides that Godwin is talking nonsense and beats him mercilessly for his crimes. Having abused her Overclock ability, half of her silver hair turns black while also weakening her. Godwin seizes this opportunity to draw Terenezza's pistol and try to shoot her, but Julius jumps in the way. Leonardo manages to heal him while Scarlet throws Godwin off the roof, but not before taking the pendent that he received from Palmia. Alflame is retrieved by his attendant Jinn, and looks forward to fighting Scarlet again. While recovering, Scarlet adopts Alflame's dragon Rex as a pet. Terenezza, believing herself the heroine, infiltrates the prison and thanks Godwin for suppressing worship of Saint Diana in favor of Palmia, the Goddess of Love. She then poisons him before deciding to defeat Scarlet herself, considering her the villainess. While digging up dirt on Terenezza, Julius is concerned certain nobles have successfully made Palmianism the state religion despite most of the population worshipping Diana, a saint with the power to banish evil. Scarlet is visited by her friends Rosalia and Envi, who are at first wary of Rex and have also begun taking an interest in marriage. Julius visits Scarlet, causing them to misunderstand. Julius reveals that Godwin died and Terenezza has vanished. Scarlet scolds him for risking his life for hers when he is the future king. Julius suddenly presents her with a tiara of roses and asks her to stay with him forever, as his favorite toy. Having half expected him to propose marriage, Scarlet requests Julius' permission to beat him up in an extremely savage manner. Elsewhere, Saint Diana looks forward to meeting Scarlet, whom she calls a "big sister".
6	"May I Send This Pig Flying Into the Sky?"; Transliteration: "Buta-san o Sora ni Tobashite Sashiagete mo Yoroshīdeshō ka" (Japanese: 豚さんを空に飛ばして差し上げてもよろしいでしょうか)	Kazunari Araki	Azuki Azuki	Mayu Nakano & Kazuya Sakamoto	November 8, 2025
After pondering over Terenezza's motives, Scarlet decides to meet Diana during her upcoming Holy Land Pilgrimage. Though wary, Leonardo allows her to go. Julius joins Scarlet for a secret mission. The two main churches of Palmianism and Dianism are within the Religious Quarter of the city, which was recently sealed off from the outside by the Wall of Impurity, built by the Palmian Pope Sargon to protect the churches. Julius suspects the wall was actually built to conceal Sargon's crimes. Jarmov the Inquisitor has the gates sealed to prevent Julius from entering, so with his permission, Scarlet destroys the gates despite it being highly durable. Jarmov fights Scarlet with his magical mace, which he got from Palmia, but Scarlet defeats and punches him high into the sky. She notes Jarmov also possessed a Palmian amulet like Godwin. Captain Paragas and Knight Dios welcome them, but Dios openly flirts with Scarlet, angering Julius and the other knights, though Scarlet isn't sure why. They meet privately with Diana who, despite her Saint title, was born a countryside commoner, is quite childish, and attached to Scarlet like a younger sister. She dislikes Julius, referring to him as an "interfering brute". As Scarlet spends the night with Diana, she explains that 300 years ago, the first Saint constructed Holy Gems of Purification to keep demons out of Pallistan Kingdom and each new Saint would pilgrimage to the gems to restore them. Unknown to the citizens, Diana has lost her Saint powers, but keeps up appearances in public. Having never felt like a Saint, Diana asks Scarlet to use her family nickname, Sanya. The next day, a Dianist parade is interrupted by explosions from the Palmian church, which Scarlet rushes to investigate. Along the way, she destroys a statue of Palmia and takes its spear.
7	"May I Carry Out a Plan That Shows a New Side of You?"; Transliteration: "Gyappu Moe Sakusen o Kekkō Shite mo Yoroshīdeshō ka" (Japanese: ギャップ萌え作戦を決行してもよろしいでしょうか)	Haruka Saiga	Azuki Azuki	Haruka Saiga	November 15, 2025
Using the spear as a missile, Scarlet collapses the Palmian Church and beats up the bomber, Catarl the Inquisitor, and his disciples. She finds that Catarl also has a Palmian amulet and was scheming to stop the Dianast parade before leaving the guards to deal with them. Diana falls from her platform after it breaks, but is caught by Leonardo, causing her to develop a crush on him. The Pilgrimage leaves the city. Julius deduces there is a Palmian spy inside the Dianist church who warned the Palmians about his and Scarlet's arrival, so he sends Sigurd to investigate. Scarlet and Leonardo join the Pilgrimage to protect Diana. Leonardo suspects Scarlet always intended to involve herself between the Palmians and Dianists, and warns her that her powers can't always help her. Scarlet learns of Diana's intense crush on Leonardo. They arrive in Memphis City where Scarlet helps Diana dress and act more casually to ask Leonardo on a date. Leonardo agrees, having been warned by Scarlet that Diana wishes to spend some time acting like a normal girl. Scarlet visits the local festival with Julius, where Golden Bull adventurers cause drunken trouble for the stall owners, so Scarlet beats them up while Julius happily pays for the damages. Diana enjoys the festival with Leonardo, even dressing him in cat ears for fun. Leonardo helps her avoid passing drunks, making her feel like a little girl. Leonardo admits that she reminds him of a younger Scarlet, but Diana insists that this is impossible as Scarlet is incredible while she is a tomboy commoner forced to act like a Saint. Leonardo assures her that she is doing the job perfectly. He is forced to leave to deal with Scarlet after learning about her fight while Diana is sent back to the inn by one of the guards. Dios is handed a note by a stall owner, which he hides from Paragas. Alflame is visited by Inquisitor Michelin, who requests his help.
8	"May I Offer You a Fist in Place of a Handkerchief?"; Transliteration: "Kobushi de Yokereba Hankachi Kawari ni Sashiagete mo Yoroshīdeshō ka" (Japanese: 拳でよければハンカチ代わりに差し上げてもよろしいでしょうか)	Daiki Handa	Fūka Ishii	Hayato Sakoda	November 22, 2025
Sigurd confirms that Pope Sargon has a spy close to Diana. At the Holy Gem of Memphis, Scarlet reveals that the Dianist Church doesn't have one Saint; it actually has two, Diana and Scarlet. Leonardo had no idea of this. Normally, Scarlet purifies the Gem while Diana restores the barrier. As Diana has no powers, Scarlet must rewind time on the Gem to ensure that it survives another year. They journey towards the Holy Gem of Snowind, where Count Padrack accuses Diana of being a witch and staging a fake pilgrimage. He also reveals that they have a real Saint from the Palmian Church, Terenezza. Terenezza uses hypnosis to make her guards try to kill Scarlet. Despite the guards having countermeasures, Scarlet defeats them and the whip-wielding Inquisitor Isabella the Disciplinarian. She tries to beat up Terenezza, but finds her protected by Diana's missing Saint powers. Dios captures Diana, revealing himself as the spy. After trading Diana for Terenezza, the latter's group escapes. Scarlet faints from over-exertion and finds herself in the realm of Chronoa, God of Time, who granted her Time magic and Diana's Barrier magic. Chronoa reveals that Palmia stole Diana's magic and gave it to Terenezza, as Palmia is in love with Chronoa and hates that he does not return her feelings and keeps blessing humans. Because gods cannot interact with the mortal world, Palmia used her own hair to create Terenezza's body as her avatar in the human world, and then made it live with the reincarnated soul of a Japanese teenager named Teresa Himemiya. As the avatar of Palmia, Terenezza seeks to kill Diana and Scarlet and destroy the Pallistan Kingdom. Chronoa gives Scarlet his own pocket watch and instructs her to activate it when close to Terenezza to retrieve Diana's powers. He also enhances her Time magic to its limit, restoring her black hair to silver.
9	"May I Explain That This is Not Something That Just Anyone Can Do?"; Transliteration: "Sore wa Dare ni demo Dekiru Kotode wa nai nodesu to Otsutae Shite mo Yoroshīdeshō ka" (Japanese: それは誰にでもできることではないのですとお伝えしてもよろしいでしょうか)	Yuuichi Satou	Deko Akao	Takuya Satō	November 29, 2025
In the past, the previous Saint died and passed her powers to Diana. She is then moved to the Church of Diana where she met and befriended Scarlet. She quickly grew to rely on Scarlet as the Secret Second Saint, but also suffered deep feelings of inferiority and jealousy of Scarlet. In the present, Scarlet remains asleep and Diana fears imprisonment for betraying Pallistan, having lost the trust of Julius and everyone else. Terenezza destroys the Snowind Holy Gem. Nanaka learns the Palmian Church has allied with the Falconia and Eldrand Empires to destroy Pallistan and only await the Vankish Empire joining them. Terenezza captures Nanaka before he can escape. With the Gem gone, monsters are able to attack Snowind while Falconia and Eldrand declare war, so Julius orders Snowblind to be evacuated while he returns to the capital. Dios infiltrates Scarlet's room and it is revealed Diana betrayed the Dianist Church and began spying for the Palmians, believing that Palmia could restore her missing Saint powers. Recognizing the harm she has caused, she refuses to spy for Dios anymore. Dios tries to kill Scarlet, but is stopped by Diana. Scarlet at last awakens and punches Dios through the wall. Alflame's vice-captain Jinn passes a message from Alflame to Julius. Scarlet interrogates Dios on his contradictory behavior, and he admits he is actually Diana's half-brother, though Diana is unaware of this. Caring deeply for Diana, he joined the Palmian church because he believed Terenezza's claim that Palmia could restore Diana's power and make her happy again. As this is not the case, he offers to betray Terenezza, but Scarlet challenges him to truly prove his love for Diana by trusting that she is more capable than he thinks, even without her Saint power.
10	"May I Cook This Thick Cut of Pork Through With Body Punches?"; Transliteration: "Buatsui o Niku no Shin made Bodiburō de hi o Tōshite mo Yoroshīdeshō ka" (Japanese: 分厚いお肉の芯までボディブローで火を通してもよろしいでしょうか)	Akira Odama	Deko Akao	Akira Odama	December 6, 2025
As Snowind prepares to evacuate, a hypnotized Nanaka tries to trick Scarlet by pretending to be Julius, but she doesn't fall for it and knocks him out to undo Terenezza's hypnosis. Nanaka tells Scarlet about what he learned. During a meeting, with Alflame joining in, Julius explains that Alflame had offered an alliance between Pallistan and himself while Jinn explains that inheriting the crown in Vankish Empire rests on strength in battle, not royal bloodlines. As Alflame will have to fight a war to inherit the throne, he is offering Pallistan 1000 of his Redsky Dragoon Dragon Riders if Pallistan supports him for the throne. Sigurd and Scarlet are still wary of him. Alflame reveals that Falconia's army of elves and beastkin are sloppy and unmotivated, as though they don't want to be there. Julius decides to negotiate with Falconia; hoping that if Falconia accepts peace, Eldrand will be forced to retreat. He sends Dios to negotiate with Falconia as a test of his loyalty to Diana. Nanaka also goes with him to convince the beastkin soldiers. Scarlet joins the Dragoons and furiously learns that Alflame told his men he convinced the "Inferno Bride" to become his fiancé, and gave her Rex as a proposal gift. She retaliates by making Rex breathe fire on Alflame, but he and the soldiers are unfazed. While fighting monsters, Scarlet confronts an Orc Lord, hypnotized by Terenezza into worshipping Palmia, who has taken a soldier named Mitch hostage. The Orc Lord claims that his orcs will eat Pallistan's women and children first and intends to do the same to Scarlet, also revealing that he can regenerate his head even after being decapitated, so Scarlet slows time and punches him hundreds of times until he dies. The orcs all retreat, and the soldiers become smitten with Scarlet for saving Mitch. Dios sends Scarlet a message revealing that his negotiations with Falconia are not going well.
11	"As These Appear Undercooked, May I Turn Them Into Minced Meat?"; Transliteration: "Yaki Tarinakatta Yōnanode isso Minchi ni Shite mo Yoroshīdeshō ka" (Japanese: 焼き足りなかったようなのでいっそミンチにしてもよろしいでしょうか)	Haruka Saiga	Deko Akao	Tomohiko Itō	December 13, 2025
Dios and Nanaka are trying to get past a horde of monsters to reach Falconia with the help of the Vankish army. Scarlet arrives to help Alflame as he manages to swiftly defeat most of the monsters, allowing Dios and Nanaka to get through. Since Dios is part elf, he should be able to negotiate with Falconia, but Nanaka is still wary of him. After Dios explains his intentions, Falconia forces, who are under Terenezza's control, ambush them, but they are stopped by a spell cast by the elf chieftain, revealed to be Dios' uncle. The elves are not willing to help, so Dios suggests a deal. Meanwhile, Scarlet defeats the remaining monsters before healing Alflame. Scarlet and Julius learn that the Falconia army is withdrawing, and Julius uses this time to embrace Scarlet while Alflame and his forces are preparing to return to Vankish. Alflame invites Scarlet to come with him as the fight will now be more difficult in the future, but she declines; not wanting to abandon her kingdom. He and Julius quickly develop a love rivalry, but Jinn stops them from fighting before Alflame's forces leave, with Alflame making Scarlet promise not to die with both vowing to see each other again. As Scarlet, Julius, and Leonardo discuss how to deal with Terenezza, Dios and Nanaka arrive and reveals her location. Terenezza is now targeting the western Holy Gem in Sahasgila, but the weapon that she will use to destroy it takes three days to recharge, so they plan to use this time to defeat her. Scarlet also decides to take Diana with them to Sahasgila and she reveals the watch that Chronoa gave her that can be used to take back Diana's stolen powers. Diana agrees to help. While alone, Scarlet talks to Julius about his earlier actions. Meanwhile, a frustrated Terenezza talks to Palmia regarding her plan's setbacks while continuing with their goal to defeat Diana and Scarlet, having also made the hypnotized Nanaka cast a charm on Julius before the hypnosis was broken.
12	"May I Pay Off the Massive Debt My Fists Have Accrued?"; Transliteration: "Tamatta Kobushi no Tsuke o Haratteitadaite mo Yoroshīdeshō ka" (Japanese: 溜まった拳のツケを払っていただいてもよろしいでしょうか)	Kazunari Araki	Azuki Azuki	Takuya Satō	December 20, 2025
Scarlet's group travel to Sahasgila. They enter the dungeon where the Holy Gem is located in search for Terenezza, with Scarlet destroying every booby trap that they encounter and confronting the Palmian soldiers who set the traps. Michelin then springs a magical trap that weakens Scarlet. Leonardo uses his clairvoyance powers to locate Terenezza, who is preparing to destroy the Holy Gem, but her presence causes his eye to bleed. Noticing that Diana is with the group, the Palmian soldiers attempt to kill her while her allies stand in defense. Despite Michelin's efforts, Scarlet manages to overpower him. Scarlet and Julius rush ahead, leaving the others to fight the enemy soldiers, but encounter Avelyn; Julius stays to fight him while Scarlet presses on. Scarlet confronts Terenezza, who both fight using powerful magic. Scarlet eventually defeats Terenezza and reclaims Diana's powers from her. Meanwhile, Dios is injured protecting Diana, but he survives, and Michelin hinders Scarlet's group with his magic. Diana discovers that she has regained her powers and is able to protect the group. Julius also manages to defeat Avelyn, but not before Avelyn reveals that he arranged his defeat to trigger the charm that Nanaka cast on Julius before, which then engulfs the latter. The brainwashed Julius then comes to Terenezza's aid. Terenezza continues her plan and has Julius hold back Scarlet, confident that she won't attack her lover. Unfazed, Scarlet attacks Julius anyway.
13	"May I Ask for One Final Thing?"; Transliteration: "Saigo ni Hitotsu dake Onegai Shitemo Yoroshī Deshō ka" (Japanese: とつだけお願いしてもよろしいでしょうか)	Kazuya Sakamoto	Deko Akao	Kazuya Sakamoto	December 27, 2025
Scarlet continues to fight Julius, to which Terenezza calls Scarlet heartless after seeing no despair. As an alternative, Terenezza threatens Julius's life to make Scarlet surrender. She then attempts to steal Scarlet's blessings while casting a spell to prevent them from being activated. Terenezza then gloats that Julius' blessing, Heroic Tale, can grant him unstoppable power to protect the woman he loves, but the feeling must be mutual to activate. Realizing Julius truly does love her, Scarlet kisses him, fully activating Heroic Tale and dispelling Terenezza's spell. Outraged by her plan's failure, Terenezza expresses her desire to kill everyone that hates her and Palmia forcibly infuses her power into Terenezza. Her regeneration capabilities prevent her from dying, but Julius is aware that Terenezza will eventually die since her body cannot contain the full power of a god. Scarlet and Julius combine their blessings, allowing Scarlet to give one final punch to Terenezza and launch her into the sky. Following Terenezza's defeat, Diana is finally able to resume her duty and restore the Holy Gems. Dios prepares to leave, but Diana arrives and learns the truth about their relationship, but gets angry when Dios pranks her. While on their way home, Leonardo reveals that the Palmian forces have surrendered and their religion has been abolished. Scarlet realizes she may have been tricked by Julius into kissing him as he secretly knew how his blessing would activate, and attends a party with Diana and Julius. When Julius tells Scarlet how to kiss properly, she dashes forward to punch him.

== Reception ==
By October 2024, the series had over 1.4 million copies in circulation.

Léonard Fougère who reviewed the series for IGN France opined that the series starts in a unique and entertaining way, offering "a fresh take on the genre", but fails to deliver much outside its "excellent" protagonist. He notes that the anime suffers from structural problems, trying to condense too many ideas, notably, about gender roles, that are more fully explored in the source manga.

J. R. Waugh writing for Screenrant noted that the anime became one of the more popular shows of its season, tweaking the common otome isekai tropes into "something spectacular and wildly hilarious", and featuring "a wonderfully cool, refreshing ... protagonist".
