= Vertex Force =

Japanese anime television series

- Key visual

バーテックスフォース (Bātekkusu Fōsu)
- Genre: Mecha
- Anime television series
- Directed by: Kazuhiro Takamura; Gorō Kuji (assistant)
- Written by: Kazuhiro Takamura; Masashi Suzuki
- Music by: Nobuaki Nobusawa
- Studio: SMDE
- Licensed by: Crunchyroll: SEA: Medialink
- Original network: Tokyo MX, BS11, GTV, GYT, Nagoya TV, ABC TV
- Original run: October 3, 2026 – present
- Episodes: 5
- icon

Vertex Force (Japanese: バーテックスフォース, Hepburn: Bātekkusu Fōsu) is an original anime television series produced by SMDE and directed by Kazuhiro Takamura, the director of Strike Witches and Vividred Operation. The series is written by Takamura and Masashi Suzuki, with Gorō Kuji serving as assistant director, Takamura also designing the characters, and Nobuaki Nobusawa composing the music. It premiered on October 3, 2026, on Tokyo MX and other networks.

== Plot ==
Two weeks after the "Power Down", an event in which computers across the globe suddenly ceased to function, a boy named Akira Tōdō, living in the northern part of Okinawa, found himself constantly relying on his older sister, Haruka. Though Akira possesses a strong sense of justice, he lacks the physical strength to act on it. While the siblings had been living a peaceful life, they were destined to fight against invaders targeting Earth. Haruka summons "Engine", a colossal robot inherited from their father, who was an extraterrestrial, while Akira taps into a hidden power known as ENIA within himself to battle the mechanical monsters known as Battlenoids who move at the behest of the mysterious EDVA.

== Characters ==
Akira Tōdō (東道明, Tōdō Akira)
Voiced by: Makoto Koichi
Haruka Tōdō (東道晴香, Tōdō Haruka)
Voiced by: Kaede Hondo
Eleanor Northbrook (エレノア・ノースブルック, Erenoa Nōsuburukku)
Voiced by: Ami Koshimizu
Lala Zudenstein (ララ・ズーデンシュタイン, Rara Zūdenshutain)
Voiced by: Megumi Han
Yōko Nishina (仁科陽子, Nishina Yōko)
Voiced by: Rie Takahashi
Alan (アラン, Aran)
Voiced by: Kazuki Ura
EDVA
Voiced by: Nana Mizuki

== Episodes ==
The opening theme song is "Synchro Blue" (シンクロブルー), performed by ClariS, and the ending theme song is "Emerald" (エメラルド), performed by Hashimero. Crunchyroll is streaming the series. Medialink licensed the series.

No.	Title	Directed by (Note: Production staff information is taken from the ending credits of each episode.)	Written by	Storyboarded by	Original release date
1	"Engine, Ignition"; Transliteration: "Enjin Shidō" (Japanese: エンジン始動)	Kazuhiro Takamura	Masashi Suzuki	Gorō Kuji	October 3, 2026
2	"Vertex"; Transliteration: "Bātekkusu" (Japanese: バーテックス)	Gorō Kuji	Masashi Suzuki	Gorō Kuji	October 10, 2026
3	"Ardent Feelings"; Transliteration: "Atsui Omoi" (Japanese: 熱い想い)	Gorō Kuji	Masashi Suzuki	Gorō Kuji	October 17, 2026
4	"Brother and Sister"; Transliteration: "Ane to Otōto" (Japanese: 姉と弟)	Nobuyoshi Arai	Masashi Suzuki	Gorō Kuji	October 24, 2026
5	"That's the Answer"; Transliteration: "Sore ga Kotaebadesu" (Japanese: それが答えです)	TBA	TBA	TBA	October 31, 2026
