= Gaslight Stray Dog Detectives =

Japanese manga series

- Gaslight Stray Dog Detectives: The Irregulars
- First tankōbon volume cover

ガス灯野良犬探偵団 (Gasu-tō Norainu Tanteidan)
- Genre: Historical; Mystery
- Manga
- Written by: Yugo Aosaki
- Illustrated by: Toshimitsu Matsubara
- Published by: Shueisha
- Imprint: Young Jump Comics
- Magazine: Weekly Young Jump
- Original run: August 10, 2023 – present
- Volumes: 12

Gaslight Stray Dog Detectives: The Irregulars (Japanese: ガス灯野良犬探偵団, Hepburn: Gasu-tō Norainu Tanteidan) is a Japanese manga series written by Yugo Aosaki and illustrated by Toshimitsu Matsubara. It began serialization in Shueisha's Weekly Young Jump magazine in August 2023, and has been compiled into 12 volumes as of September 2026.

== Plot ==
Louie, a homeless young boy living in 19th-century London, does menial jobs like shining shoes for a living. After his close friend Nina is murdered, his sense of justice strengthens and he furthers his desire to protect the city's homeless. When he encounters the detective Sherlock Holmes, he resents him, feeling that Holmes only cares about the upper classes while also suspecting that he was involved in Nina's death. Not wanting her death to be in vain, Louie offers to be Holmes's new "dog", offering to help Holmes in solving cases.

== Characters ==
Louie (リューイ, Ryūi)
Voiced by: Shun Horie (vomic)
A homeless boy in London who earns money as a shoe shiner. Being a vagrant himself, he felt a close connection to the city's homeless population. He was close friends with Nina, a young girl his age who also wanted to protect the vagrants, only for her to be murdered. Angered by her murder, Louie develops a resentment for the upper classes, culminating in his encounter with Sherlock Holmes.
Sherlock Holmes (シャーロック・ホームズ, Shārokku Hōmuzu)
Voiced by: Koki Uchiyama (vomic)
A budding detective who focuses on investigating cases involving London's upper classes. Louie initially resents him due to Holmes' disdain for the lower classes, but ultimately comes to work with him.
Nina (ニナ)
Louie's close friend, whom he treated as family. She was killed after being framed for murder, which angers Louie.

== Development ==
In developing the series, Yugo Aosaki wanted to contrast his depiction of Sherlock Holmes from other interpretations of the character by making him act like a villain. He wanted Louie and Holmes' relationship to be similar to that of a student and mentor, with particular focus on how Louie was a street child from London, a subject which he felt was underutilized in other works.

Toshimitsu Matsubara, who previously served as an assistant in the manga series Kingdom and previously serialized the series Valhallian the Black Iron in Weekly Young Jump, was hired to serve as illustrator following Aosaki's request for someone who could draw in an analog-inspired style. Matsubara was informed of the draft by his editor, with the timing being appropriate as he had been struggling to start a new series after his previous one ended. Matsubara had never worked with a novelist before, but found Aosaki knowledgeable and easy to work with. Aosaki contrasted writing the scripts with writing novels, noting that due to the differences in format, he had to minimize the length of dialogues.

== Publication ==
The series is written by Yugo Aosaki, who also wrote the novel series Undead Girl Murder Farce, and is illustrated by Toshimitsu Matsubara. It began serialization in Shueisha's Weekly Young Jump magazine on August 10, 2023. The first tankōbon volume was released on December 19, 2023, with a voice comic video being released on the official Young Jump YouTube channel to promote the volume's release. Voice comic video adaptations of chapters 1 and 2 were uploaded to YouTube to promote the release of the eleventh volume. Twelve volumes have been released as of September 17, 2026. The series is licensed in Europe by Panini Media.

No.	Release date	ISBN
1	December 19, 2023	978-4-08-893037-4
2	March 18, 2024	978-4-08-893165-4
3	June 19, 2024	978-4-08-893264-4
4	September 19, 2024	978-4-08-893374-0
5	December 18, 2024	978-4-08-893477-8
6	March 18, 2025	978-4-08-893584-3
7	June 18, 2025	978-4-08-893695-6
8	September 19, 2025	978-4-08-893798-4
9	December 18, 2025	978-4-08-894029-8
10	March 18, 2026	978-4-08-894126-4
11	June 18, 2026	978-4-08-894250-6
12	September 17, 2026	978-4-08-894340-4

== See also ==
- Undead Girl Murder Farce, a novel series by the same author
