= Undead Girl Murder Farce =

Japanese novel series and its franchise

- First novel volume cover

アンデッドガール・マーダーファルス (Andeddo Gāru Mādā Farusu)
- Genre: Drama; Fantasy; Historical
- Novel series
- Written by: Yugo Aosaki
- Published by: Kodansha
- Imprint: Kodansha Taiga
- Original run: December 17, 2015 – present
- Volumes: 4
- Manga
- Written by: Yugo Aosaki
- Illustrated by: Haruka Tomoyama
- Published by: Kodansha
- English publisher: NA: Kodansha USA
- Magazine: Monthly Shōnen Sirius (2016–2017); Nemesis (2017–2018); Comic Days (2018–present)
- Original run: June 25, 2016 – present
- Volumes: 3 + 5
- Anime television series

Undead Murder Farce
- Directed by: Mamoru Hatakeyama
- Produced by: Hana Sugawara
- Written by: Noboru Takagi
- Music by: Yuma Yamaguchi
- Studio: Lapin Track
- Licensed by: Crunchyroll; SA/SEA: Medialink
- Original network: Fuji TV (+Ultra)
- Original run: July 6, 2023 – September 28, 2023
- Episodes: 13
- icon

Undead Girl Murder Farce (アンデッドガール・マーダーファルス, Andeddo Gāru Mādā Farusu) is a Japanese novel series written by Yugo Aosaki. It began publication in December 2015, with four volumes being published as of 2023. A manga adaptation illustrated by Haruka Tomoyama began serialization on Kodansha's Monthly Shōnen Sirius magazine in June 2016, before moving to Nemesis in 2017, and then to the Comic Days website in 2018. The manga has been compiled into three print and five digital tankōbon volumes. An anime television series adaptation produced by Lapin Track aired on Fuji TV's +Ultra programming block from July to September 2023.

== Plot ==
The story is set in an alternate timeline, during the Belle Époque era in the late 19th century, where supernatural creatures such as vampires and oni exist in the same world as humans. Tsugaru Shinuchi, an experimental half-oni known as the Oni Slayer, accepts a job from an immortal woman named Aya Rindo with her loyal servant Shizuku Hasei. Tsugaru wishes to find a way to extend his lifespan, while Aya exists solely as a talking head who wants to die. When they both realize the person behind their current predicament was a wealthy foreigner with an "M" printed on his cane, they leave Japan for Europe and try to track him down. While trying to locate Aya's missing body and hopefully their target with it, the trio take on supernatural mysteries across Europe with Tsugaru taking on the persona of "The Cage User" for the birdcage he carries with Aya's head inside.

== Characters ==
=== The Cage User ===
Aya Rindo (輪堂 鴉夜, Rindō Aya)
Voiced by: Tomoyo Kurosawa
A young Heian era woman and a yōkai, who is beheaded by an unknown half-oni assailant from Britain and has her headless body taken away. Since she is a Fushi (a kind of immortal youkai), she cannot die (though being decapitated by a half-oni means she cannot heal herself) and thus her head continues to live on, ultimately seeking support from Tsugaru to get her body back and take revenge on the man who left her like this.
Tsugaru Shinuchi (真打 津軽, Shin'uchi Tsugaru)
Voiced by: Taku Yashiro
A former member of a special oni extermination squad charged with slaughtering monsters across Japan during the Meiji Restoration. At some point, he was injected with oni blood by the same man who beheaded Aya and turned into a half-oni himself. Though the power allows him to kill oni and other supernatural beings with his bare hands, he knows that at some point in the future the oni blood will overcome his human personality and he will be put down by a similar hunter. In the meantime, he supports himself by fighting other demons in cage matches as a circus act called the Oni Slayer.
Shizuku Hasei (馳井 静句, Hasei Shizuku)
Voiced by: Makoto Koichi
A stern maid who serves under Aya. She wields a rifle with an attached bayonet that fires silver rounds.

=== Parisians ===
Annie Kerber (アニー・ケルベル, Anī Keruberu)
Voiced by: Sayumi Suzushiro
A young Parisian journalist girl who follows the exploits of The Cage User and the various supernatural cases they run into around Europe.
Arsène Lupin (アルセーヌ・ルパン, Arusēnu Rupan)
Voiced by: Mamoru Miyano
A gentlemanly Parisian thief and a master of disguise who loves playing with his targets, even sending calling cards to his targets to prove he can steal their treasure regardless of their defenses against him.
Phantom (ファントム, Fantomu)
Voiced by: Hiro Shimono
A mysterious Persian orphan who lives beneath a theater in Paris. Lupin recruits him for a heist he plans to attempt in London.
Ganimard (ガニマール, Ganimāru)
Voiced by: Kōsei Hirota
A Parisian Inspector who doggedly pursues Lupin, though with little actual success.

=== 221B Baker Street ===
Sherlock Holmes (シャーロック・ホームズ, Shārokku Hōmuzu)
Voiced by: Shin-ichiro Miki
A legendary private detective who consults for Scotland Yard in London. A master at deductive reasoning and baritsu for self-defense. Aya finds him odd.
John H. Watson (ジョン・H・ワトソン, Jon H Watoson)
Voiced by: Masaki Aizawa
A physician and Sherlock's faithful companion.

=== The Banquet ===
James Moriarty (ジェームズ・モリアーティ, Jēmuzu Moriāti)
Voiced by: Wataru Yokojima
Sherlock Holmes′ legendary rival, a genius Professor who commands a group of similarly evil companions to perform experiments for his own ends. He is the old man with the "M" on his cane responsible for Aya and Tsugaru's respective conditions.
Aleister Crowley (アレイスター・クロウリー, Areisutā Kurōrī)
Voiced by: Tomokazu Sugita
An English magician and cult leader who currently works with The Professor.
Carmilla (カーミラ, Kāmira)
Voiced by: Reina Kondō
A beautiful and deadly vampire with incredible swordsmanship who works for The Professor.
Victor (ヴィクター, Vikutā)
Voiced by: Itaru Yamamoto
A giant undead monster who currently works for The Professor.
Jack the Ripper (切り裂きジャック, Kirisaki Jakku)
Voiced by: Soma Saito
The legendary English serial killer who was turned part-oni from The Professor's experiments, and the one who separated Aya's head from her body.

=== Wolfinhöhle ===
Nora (ノラ)
Voiced by: Maaya Uchida
Vera (ヴェラ)
Voiced by: Yumiri Hanamori
Kaya (カーヤ, Kāya)
Voiced by: Saima Nakano

=== Lloyd's ===
Reynold Stinghart (レイノルド・スティングハート, Reinorudo Sutinguhāto)
Voiced by: Shin'ichiro Kamio
Lloyd's Insurance Agent #5, a swordsman who detests getting himself dirty. He can even cleave stone pillars with his sword.
Fatima Doubledarts (ファティマ・ダブルダーツ, Fatima Daburu Dātsu)
Voiced by: Sara Matsumoto
Lloyd's Insurance Agent #7. Fatima wields a crossbow on each of her arms modified to fire semi-automatically, with customized bolts that can punch through thick surfaces or ricochet off walls.
Alice Rapidshot (アリス・ラピッドショット, Arisu Rapiddoshotto)
Voiced by: Ayaka Asai
Insurance Agent #3, a hot-headed cowgirl who wields a pair of revolvers with silver ammo.
Kyle Chaintail (カイル・チェーンテイル, Kairu Chēnteiru)
Voiced by: Sō Nozawa
Insurance Agent #4, a large black man with an effeminite face who wields heavy metal chains.

=== Others ===
Phil Fogg (フィリアス・フォッグ, Firiasu Foggu)
Voiced by: Hideaki Tezuka
A wealthy Londoner with a large mansion containing several treasures of his travels going around the world in 80 days.
Passepartout (パスパルトゥー, Pasuparutū)
Voiced by: Hidenari Ugaki
Fogg's French butler and close confidant.
Lestrade (レストレード, Resutorēdo)
Voiced by: Taiten Kusunoki
The Chief Inspector of Scotland Yard who often calls upon Sherlock Holmes to help him solve difficult cases.
Louise (ルイーゼ, Ruize)
Voiced by: Anna Nagase
Rosa (ローザ)
Voiced by: Aki Nagao
Yutte (ユッテ)
Voiced by: Emiri Suyama
Alma (アルマ, Aruma)
Voiced by: Hitomi Nabatame
Gunther (ギュンター, Gyuntā)
Voiced by: Takaki Ōtomari
Dennis (デニス, Denisu)
Voiced by: Shunsuke Takeuchi
Falk (ファルク, Faruku)
Voiced by: Kazuki Ura
Bernt (ベルント, Berunto)
Voiced by: Seiichiro Yamashita
Bjorn (ビョルン, Byorun)
Voiced by: Takuya Nakashima
Old Lady Regi (レギ婆, Regi Baba)
Voiced by: Sayuri Sadaoka

== Media ==
=== Novel ===
Written by Yugo Aosaki, Undead Girl Murder Farce was first published by Kodansha on December 17, 2015, under their Kodansha Taiga imprint. As of July 2023, four volumes have been released.

| No. | Japanese release date | Japanese ISBN |
|---|---|---|
| 1 | December 17, 2015 | 978-4-06-294009-2 |
| 2 | October 19, 2016 | 978-4-06-294030-6 |
| 3 | April 15, 2021 | 978-4-06-522368-0 |
| 4 | July 14, 2023 | 978-4-06-532520-9 |

=== Manga ===
A manga adaptation illustrated by Haruka Tomoyama began serialization on Kodansha's Monthly Shōnen Sirius magazine on June 25, 2016. It later moved to Kodansha's Nemesis magazine on June 9, 2017. After Nemesis ceased publication, the series was moved to the Comic Days website. As of June 2018, three print tankōbon volumes have been released.

In May 2021, Kodansha USA announced that it had licensed the manga for English digital publication.

| No. | Original release date | Original ISBN | English release date | English ISBN |
|---|---|---|---|---|
| 1 | October 20, 2016 | 978-4-06-390655-4 | May 25, 2021 | 978-1-63-699150-4 |
| 2 | August 9, 2017 | 978-4-06-390707-0 | June 29, 2021 | 978-1-63-699233-4 |
| 3 | June 8, 2018 | 978-4-06-511670-8 | July 27, 2021 | 978-1-63-699302-7 |
| 4 | July 5, 2023 (digital) | — | November 7, 2023 | 979-8-88-933267-1 |
| 5 | July 5, 2023 (digital) | — | April 16, 2024 | 979-8-88-933442-2 |
| 6 | July 5, 2023 (digital) | — | June 18, 2024 | 979-8-88-933573-3 |
| 7 | July 5, 2023 (digital) | — | October 22, 2024 | 979-8-88-933696-9 |
| 8 | April 2, 2025 (digital) | — | January 13, 2026 | 979-8-89-478809-8 |

=== Anime ===
An anime television series adaptation was announced during the "Fuji TV Anime Lineup Presentation 2023" on March 22, 2023. The series was produced by Lapin Track and directed by Mamoru Hatakeyama, with Noboru Takagi serving as head writer, Noriko Ito designing the characters based on Zerogo Iwamoto's concepts while also serving as chief animation director alongside Naho Kazono, and Yuma Yamaguchi composing the music. It aired from on July 6 to September 28, 2023, on Fuji TV's +Ultra programming block. The opening theme is "Crack-Crack-Crackle" by CLASS:y while the ending theme is "Reversal" by Anna. Crunchyroll streamed the series. Medialink licensed the series in Asia-Pacific and streamed on the Ani-One Asia YouTube channel. In the anime adaptation, the security agent characters belong to Royce instead of Lloyd's.

==== Episodes ====
| No. | Title | Directed by | Written by | Storyboarded by | Original release date (Note: Fuji TV lists the series premiere at 24:55 on July 5, 2023, which is effectively 12:55 a.m. JST on July 6.) |
|---|---|---|---|---|---|
| 1 | "Oni Slayer"; Transliteration: "Onigoroshi" (Japanese: 鬼殺し) | Hiroki Koike | Noboru Takagi | Mamoru Hatakeyama | July 6, 2023 |
In 1897, as modernization and westernization sweep through Japan, the country is in the process of exterminating oni, ayakashi, and other monsters. Tsugaru Shinuchi, known as the "Oni Slayer", makes a living killing some of these monsters in cage fights as a circus act. One evening, Tsugaru is attacked by a woman in a French maid outfit. The pair are interrupted by woman's voice coming from the birdcage the maid was carrying. She is revealed to be the severed head of an immortal who introduces herself as Aya Rindo and her maid bodyguard as Shizuku Hasei. She requests that Tsugaru help find her body and offers Tsugaru a chance to extend his lifespan, knowing that he is a half-oni who is in danger of being consume by his demon side. They discover that their predicaments both stem from a foreigner with an "M" engraved on his cane. Tsugaru admits he initially planned to accept his decline into becoming a mindless oni and take revenge on the circus and its bloodthirsty audience who treated his fights as entertainment. However, Aya gives him a reason to delay his demise, so he kisses her in a makeshift contract.
| 2 | "Vampire"; Transliteration: "Kyūketsuki" (Japanese: 吸血鬼) | Yayoi Tanaka | Noboru Takagi | Mamoru Hatakeyama | July 13, 2023 (Note: This episode aired at 1:10 a.m. JST, 15 minutes after the original airtime on Fuji TV.) |
In 1898, a mansion in Le Givre is home to a family of vampires who are trying to make peace with humans sometime after Count Dracula's death. However, Lord Godard comes home to find his wife, Hannah, murdered. Feeling resentful of the police's efforts to find the culprit, Godard decides to hire "The Cage User," a private detective who has recently built a reputation for solving supernatural cases around Europe. The Cage User turns out to be Tsugaru, though he admits he is more of an apprentice to the real detective that is Aya's head. After surveying the crime scene, Aya asks several questions: how did the murderer know where to find a silver stake and break the lock to the storeroom, know exactly where the victim would be, to kill her without a struggle, and yet be sloppy enough to leave evidence of a bottle of holy water behind? As Aya and Godard ponder these questions, a mysterious hunter approaches from the woods outside.
| 3 | "The Immortal and the Oni"; Transliteration: "Fushi to Oni" (Japanese: 不死と鬼) | Ken Sanuma | Noboru Takagi | Takashi Kawabata | July 20, 2023 |
Aya interviews Lord Godard, his family, and their servants at dinner about their activities the hour before the murder. She narrows her suspects down to Alfred the butler, and the older son Claude; however, she is unable to resolve a couple of contradictory facts. Later, while walking in the woods, Godard is attacked by a hunter named Josef. Godard easily overpowers the hunter, but Tsugaru and Aya stop Godard from killing Josef, instead interrogating him. Josef reveals that another hunter named Hugo had gone to the mansion three days earlier, planning to kill a vampire with a silver stake, and knew someone on the inside willing to help him. When he did not return, Josef tried to complete the mission. After Tsugaru let Josef leave, Aya asks Godard to gather everyone inside the mansion, confident that she can now identify the murderer.
| 4 | "The Headliner Appears"; Transliteration: "Shin'uchi Tōjō" (Japanese: 真打登場) | Shoushi Ishikawa | Noboru Takagi | Isoroku Koga | July 27, 2023 (Note: This episode aired at 1:05 a.m. JST, 10 minutes after the original airtime on Fuji TV.) |
After laying out her evidence, Aya deduces that the real killer was the younger son Raoul. He reacts by trying to attack Aya, but Tsugaru quickly throws him outside and begins beating him up. Aya informs Lord Godard that Raoul involved Hugo in a plan to kill a vampire with a silver stake. When Godard defeated the hunter, Raoul took out the stake and filled its empty case with holy water, let it freeze in the outside cold and then used it to murder Hannah. Raoul then spilled some of Hannah's blood on the silver stake in the stockroom to make it appear as though a human had murdered her, hoping this would cause his father to retaliate against humans. As Raoul meets his end at Tsugaru's hands outside, the sun rises and Aya asks Godard about a man with an M on his cane. Godard replies that a few days earlier he was approached by a man calling himself "Professor" who offered to take him to London, but he declined.
| 5 | "The Immortal of London"; Transliteration: "Rondon no Fushisha" (Japanese: 倫敦(ロンドン)の不死者) | Yoshitsugu Kimura | Chiaki J. Konaka | Mamoru Hatakeyama | August 3, 2023 |
In 1899, Arsene Lupin recruits Erik, the Phantom of the Opera, to steal a diamond called the "Penultimate Night" from Phil's mansion in London. Meanwhile, Tsugaru and Aya try to obtain the name of the Professor from a London cane shop but are accosted by two men and picked up by London police who already have twin thieves in custody. The men turn out to be Sherlock Holmes and his assistant Dr. Watson, one of two detectives hired by Fogg to counter Lupin's threat: the other being the Cage User. Upon hearing this, the police transport the detectives straight to Fogg's mansion. Fogg shows off his security measures to the detectives, Inspector Lestrade and two members of the highly regarded Royce group. He also displays the diamond locked in a small puzzle safe made of silver. Fogg claims the diamond and the safe were both made by German dwarves who left a message behind for future generations. Both detectives try to think of how Lupin could infiltrate the chamber with the many layers of security, and Aya comes up with an improbable but not impossible method, teasing Tsugaru with the hint of Ishikawa Goemon.
| 6 | "The Phantom Thief and the Detective"; Transliteration: "Kaitō to Tantei" (Japanese: 怪盗と探偵) | Masakazu Obara | Chiaki J. Konaka | Masakazu Obara | August 10, 2023 |
Mycroft Holmes pays a visit to Holmes and Watson in their flat on Baker Street but quickly deduces that Holmes is an Lupin in disguise who is exposed when the real Holmes arrives. Lupin leaps out a window, promising to steal Fogg's treasure. Meanwhile, Tsugaru discovers that the cage with Aya's head was accidentally switched with one containing a parrot. Shizuku is nearly run over by Erik driving Lupin's getaway car, and Lupin offers help her find Aya. Mycroft warns Sherlock to beware of the Royce's agents, whom he suspects plan steal the diamond themselves and let Lupin take the fall. The twin thieves from earlier run over Aya with their vehicle, but she is rescued by Lupin who reveals himself to the Cage User group. Tsugaru attacks him, but Lupin is able to knock him unconscious and warn Aya to stay off the case. That night, Lupin puts his plan into action while Aya sends a note to Sherlock that she intends to watch from above-ground. Inside the secure chamber, Sherlock fires multiple rounds into the keyholes, jamming the locks and sealing him, Watson, Fogg and Inspector Ganimard inside. However, when the appointed time comes, an explosion in the moat to the mansion causes water to fill the underground chamber through the air vent.
| 7 | "Free for All"; Transliteration: "Konsen Yūgi" (Japanese: 混戦遊戯) | Shingo Kaneko | Chiaki J. Konaka | Mamoru Hatakeyama | August 17, 2023 |
Royce's agent, Fatima Doubledarts, frees the group from the flooded chamber, but the silver safe and diamond are missing. Sherlock quickly deduces that Lupin disguised himself as Inspector Ganimard and assisted Erik to pull the safe up through the broken vent. Sherlock hid the diamond in Watson's jacket but Lupin grabs the diamond and escapes with Erik in the confusion. They arrive at the greenhouse, only to find that Aya had been hiding inside the safe the whole time and she calls for Tsugaru. Shizuku and Tsugaru prepare to fight Lupin and Erik, but Royce's agent Reynold Stinghart arrives and takes the diamond. Suddenly, the access bridge is blown up and the Professor and his entourage arrive on the mansion grounds, slaughtering several guards in their search for the diamond. Lupin, Erik, Holmes, Watson, the Cage User group, the Royce's agents, the Professor's group, and the police detachment all engage in a battle across the mansion for the diamond.
| 8 | "The Banquet"; Transliteration: "Ya'en" (Japanese: 夜宴) | Yayoi Tanaka | Chiaki J. Konaka | Nobuyuki Takeuchi | August 24, 2023 |
As the battle rages on in the chapel, Camilla manages to subdue Shizuku, Erik confounds Fatima, and Lupin temporarily allies with Tsugaru to fight Reynold. Meanwhile, Holmes tries to think of a strategy to counter Aleister's poison darts. The fights are interrupted as Jack the Ripper bursts into the chapel, killing both Fatima and Reynold before taking the diamond. Lupin and Erik decide to flee, not wanting to risk fighting Jack. Meanwhile, the Professor himself appears before Holmes, Watson, and Aya, revealing that he is none other than James Moriarty. He admits he has Aya's body and that he injected the blood of an immortal mixed with that of an Oni into several subjects, but only Jack survived, making him powerful and nearly indestructible. He now wants to add the blood of a werewolf to make Jack even more powerful. Jack grabs the diamond, and while defeating Tsugaru, recognizes him as a survivor of Moriarty's oni experiment. Jack signals Moriarty's group, the "Banquet" organization, their mission is complete, and they leave. However, Tsugaru reveals that he swiped the diamond from Jack's pocket and Aya uses it to decipher the location of German werewolves.
| 9 | "Werewolf"; Transliteration: "Jinrõ" (Japanese: 人狼) | Shoshi Ishikawa | Noboru Takagi | Katsumi Terato | August 31, 2023 |
Eight years earlier in the Southwestern German mountains, a werewolf was pursued and attacked by a group of villagers, but she sacrificed herself to save her daughter. Now, Tsugaru, Aya and Shizuku search the area for werewolves and near the village of Heulendorf they encounter the village doctor, Heinemann. He has heard of the Cage User and begs them to investigate the abduction of village girls on rainy nights every four months who are then found torn to pieces. They meet the villagers, who are quite hostile, but Aya convinces Gustav, father of the crippled Louise and the latest girl to be taken, that she can identify the culprit within two days. Aya determines that a werewolf descended the chimney in wolf form, transformed into a werewolf, messed up the room in an apparent rage and wrapped Louise on a cloth before escaping with her through a now-broken window. Aya tells Gustav he is unlikely to see Louise "alive" again but will do her utmost to discover the killer. Aya, Tsugaru, and Shizuku visit the elderly, bedridden mayor who only agrees to point them towards the mystical werewolf village in the Forest of Fangs after Aya promises to name the killer within two days. Meanwhile, the two Royce's agents Kylie and Alice arrived by train.
| 10 | "Misty Hollow"; Transliteration: "Kiri no Kubochi" (Japanese: 霧の窪地) | Shoushi Ishikawa | Noboru Takagi | Mamoru Hatakeyama | September 7, 2023 |
Aya tells the mayor that she suspects a werewolf lives in Heulendorf even though he investigated the outsiders, Heinemann the doctor, Cnut the engineer and Alma the artist but eliminated them as suspects. He says the werewolves are only vulnerable in their human forms and thinks an "ultimate" werewolf is the product of selective breeding and may be very hard to kill. Aya questions Cnut who explains that thirteen years ago the village took in the pregnant woman Rosa who later gave birth to Jutte, but they were both killed after being identified as werewolves. Aya interviews Alma whom she suspects is lying about her past, and then interviews Heinemann but they are interrupted by the arrival of Royce's agents Alice Rapidshot and Kyle Chaintail. That night the villagers surround Alma's house believing she is the werewolf, and she proclaims that she killed and ate Louise before she transforms into a golden werewolf. She seems impervious to the silver bullets of Rapidshot and Shizuku and escapes into the forest pursued by Tsugaru carrying Aya. Tsugaru and the werewolf engage in a fierce fight and the werewolf throws Aya's cage over the waterfall at Misty Hollow, however Shizuku saves Aya before falling to the watery depths below herself.
| 11 | "Where the Wolves Dwell"; Transliteration: "Okami no Sumika" (Japanese: 狼の棲家) | Tomoko Hiramuka | Noboru Takagi | Yui Miura | September 14, 2023 (Note: This episode aired at 1:15 a.m. JST, 20 minutes after the original airtime on Fuji TV.) |
After Aya uncovers Alma as the werewolf, the mayor agrees to tell her how to use the diamond to find the Forest of Fangs, and they leave before dawn accompanied by the Royce agents. Meanwhile, Shizuku awakens in the werewolf village, Wolphinhel, where three girls are keeping her warm. The leader of the girls, Nora, tells Shizuku that young werewolf girls are being murdered in the forest on rainy days, their faces covered in buckshot. Because the rain drowns out both smell and the sound, they can't track the murderer. The girls then try to smuggle Shizuku out of their village, but she is discovered and put on trial by the elderly village chief. The chief is unwilling to listen to the claims by Shizuku and Nora's friends, Vera and Kaya, that she is innocent. The trial is suddenly interrupted when a gunshot rings out from the forest. The werewolves rush to the sound where they see Nora dead from a gunshot wound to the chest. Shizuku gathers clues from the crime scene which suggest Nora was shot elsewhere and carried to the current spot, and what they heard was a second gunshot. However, she cannot reach a conclusion, further angering the werewolves. Meanwhile, as the Cage User and Royce's agents slowly make their way towards the village along a cliff-face, they are attacked by Moriarty's monster, Victor.
| 12 | "Where the River's Flow Changes"; Transliteration: "Nagare no Majiwaru Basho" (Japanese: 流れの交わる場所) | Yayoi Tanaka | Noboru Takagi | Mamoru Hatakeyama | September 21, 2023 |
Victor takes Aya and Tsugaru to the bottom of the cliff, explaining he saved them from the Royce agents. In return he asks for the location of the werewolf village and the black diamond as collateral. Aya agrees as his associate Carmilla is unable to move during daylight hours. On arriving at Wolphinhel, Vera takes Aya and Tsugaru to see Shizuku, who informs them of her findings, but they can't free her yet as her absence will raise the alarm. Instead, Aya uses Tsugaru to gather more clues where Nora's body was found and spots a hidden switch on a conical rock. The two enter a secret underground passage and find a shotgun with other evidence the other girls were murdered there - where the werewolves would be unable to see, hear, or smell the murder. They also find Alma's corpse in the passage, though Aya notes she wasn't killed there. After emerging from the passage near Heulendorf, Aya sees Louise's parents who confess they abandoned her because of her disability. Louise was rescued by Jutte, whom she later betrayed her to the other villagers to prove her worth. Aya and Tsugaru return to Wolphinhel and free Shizuku but are tracked by three werewolves. Meanwhile, the Royce agents rally the humans and lead an attack on Wolphinhel to slaughter the werewolves and are joined by The Banquet. As the battle rages, Aya sends Shizuku to save Kaya while she gets Vera to dig in a nearby graveyard, uncovering the last clue she needs to solve the mystery.
| 13 | "The Culprit's Name"; Transliteration: "Hannin no Namae" (Japanese: 犯人の名前) | Hiroki Koike | Noboru Takagi | Mamoru Hatakeyama | September 28, 2023 (Note: This episode aired at 12:50 a.m. JST, 5 minutes before the original airtime on Fuji TV.) |
Tsugaru knocks out Kyle to save Victor, who gives him the diamond back and the information that Aya's body is locked up in Moriarty's base in London as thanks. Alice uses her trick-shooting skills but is outfoxed by Aleister and stuck with a slow-acting poison. Shizuku fights Carmilla in a rematch of their London fight but it ends in a draw. The Cage User group reconvenes at the town square to reveal the killer who murdered every girl in both villages was Nora, who was also Jutte and Louise at different times depending on the context, as all three girls looked very similar. Making use of the underground passage, Nora escaped the village when the original Louise revealed her as Jutte and sparked a mob of humans to burn her and her mother to death. She lived as a werewolf in Wolphinhuel, but did not like how she and other werewolf girls were being treated there either. So, using the hidden passage, she kidnapped Louise and posed as her in the human village, then would pick a stray young human girl to murder and drag them to the werewolf village to later be discovered, ensuring that the humans and werewolves would suspect the other as the culprit. Nora admits to her role as the culprit, including the deaths of Alma and the real Louise in the hidden passage. As she flees the scene and returns to her cave, Tsugaru awaits and manages to tie her up, but Aya lets Nora go, as she believed that her goals of freeing her fellow villagers from sexual servitude by faking their deaths with human bodies was a noble goal. As Nora decides to travel the world, The Cage User plans to return to London.

== See also ==
- Gaslight Stray Dog Detectives, a manga series by the same author
