= Double Circle (web series) =

2013 Japanese original net animation

ダブルサークル (Daburusākuru)
- Original net animation
- Released: December 19, 2013
- Episodes: 6

Double Circle (ダブルサークル, Daburusākuru) is a 6-episode Japanese original net animation, produced as a collaboration between Toshiba and the city of Kawasaki, Kanagawa. The first episode was streamed via YouTube on December 19, 2013.

== Characters ==
Nanoha (ナノハ)
Voiced by: Chiwa Saitō
M (エム, Emu)
Voiced by: Daisuke Namikawa
Asagi (アサギ)
Voiced by: Nobuhiko Okamoto
Akane (アカネ)
Voiced by: Asami Seto
