= Tarepanda =

San-X character

Tarepanda, described by creator Hikaru Suemasa as "strange", with a "fixed gaze"

Tarepanda (たれぱんだ) is a kawaii (cute) panda-like character released by the Japanese company San-X in 1998. The term tare (垂れ) means droopy in Japanese. The character was created by Hikaru Suemasa (ja:末政ひかる), who was inspired by being exhausted at work. Three picture books and a fanbook by Suemasa were published in Japan. A Tarepanda video game was released for the WonderSwan in 1999, and another one for the PlayStation in 2000. A Tarepanda OVA was released in 2000.

Tarepanda was a major success and by 1999, sales of Tarepanda merchandise had reached 30 billion yen. The success of Tarepanda changed San-X from a stationery company to a full-time character creation and licensing company. The blank expression and unobtrusive presence of Tarepanda was the origin of the style that would come to be seen as emblematic of San-X.

== Characteristics ==
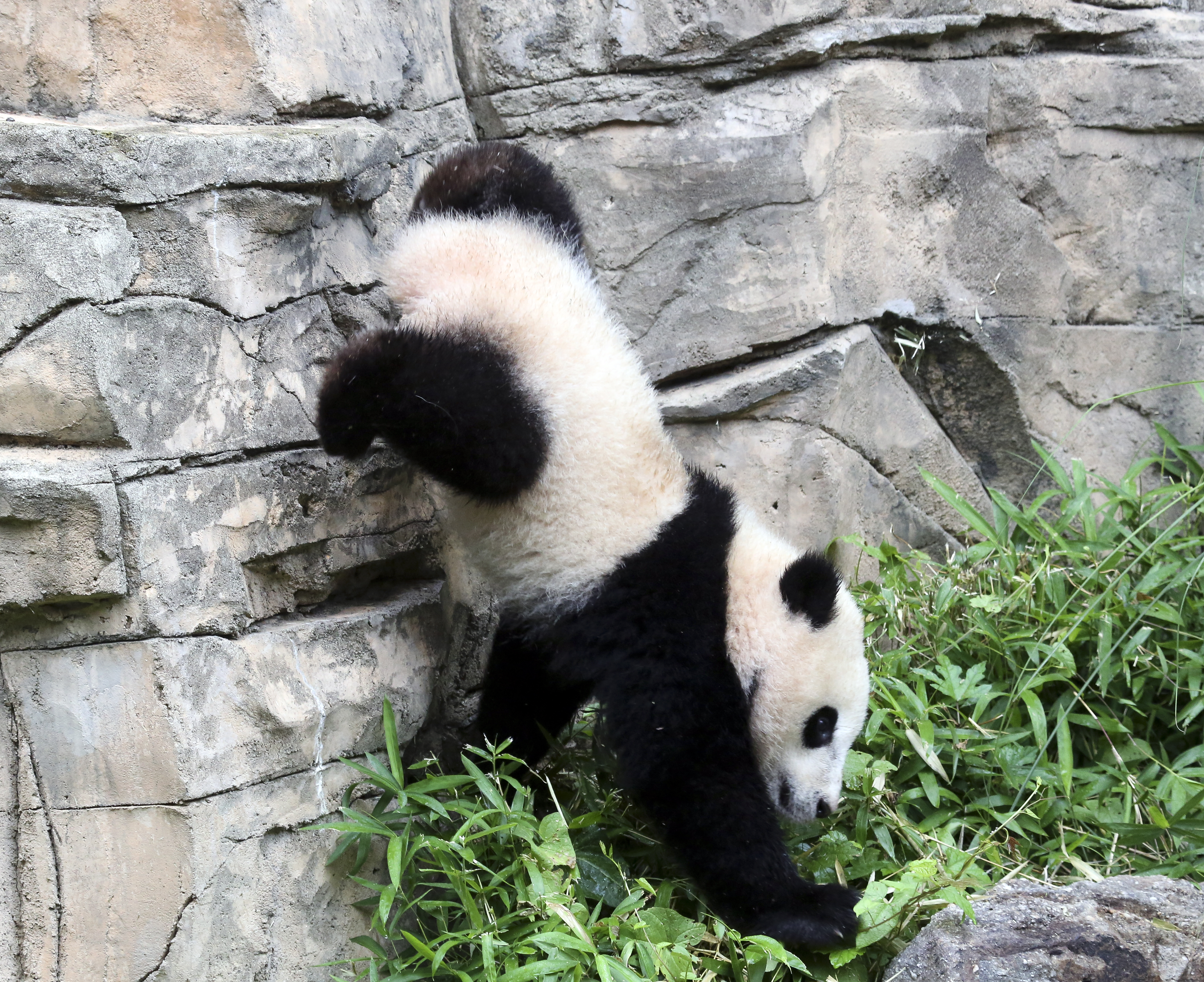
Unlike a real panda, Tarepanda has a black tail

San-X has said that Tarepanda's not an actual panda, but "a creature that resembles a panda". Whereas real pandas have white tails, Tarepanda has a black tail. The Tarepanda characters also vary widely in size, between 5 centimeters and 3 meters. There is also mecha Tarepanda with riveted seams and a wind-up key, described as "hard but still drooping". Tarepanda is a character that moves by rolling over, with a speed of 2.75 meters per hour. Tarepanda's favorite food is mochi, especially suama. Wired characterized Tarepanda as a "genderless sandbag of a bear so weak that it cannot walk", while T: The New York Times Style Magazine described it as a character that is "eternally prostrate" and "whose limbs are mere stubs". Creator Hikaru Suemasa described Tarepanda as "strange", with a "fixed gaze".

Tarepanda designs are typically made in a soft pencil drawing style. They are often black and white, or a sepia monochrome. More unique designs have used hand-carved stamps and monochrome photocopying for unusual textures. Tarepanda illustrations used for stationery and in picture books include characters rolling over, gathered into piles, or in a jar. They are also shown lying in a hammock, beach chair, or reclining against a tree. Smaller Tarepanda characters are shown lying in a coffee cup, on top of a slice of melon, or inside of a blooming rose. There are also more surreal illustrations, like a large mecha Tarepanda with many small Tarepanda characters in its mouth, or a landscape with a mountain in the shape and coloring of Tarepanda.

== Creation ==
Hikaru Suemasa (ja:末政ひかる) studied graphic design at Tama Art University. She joined San-X in 1995, and in November that year she was tasked with designing a panda character for stickers. She tried drawing all kinds of pandas, like cute ones and lively ones, but her designs kept being rejected. As she was getting exhausted, she drew a panda that was also looking exhausted and drooping. This was the design that was finally accepted and would go on to become Tarepanda. Because of the style of the stickers, this original panda design was flat and had a thick outline. The panda stickers was one out of 12 different types, and sold better than the rest.

Then in February 1998, the panda character was revisited. Because 3DCG was trendy at the time, Suemasa redesigned it in a softer, shaded three dimensional style. But she did it by hand-drawing with pencil because it was "faster than learning how to use a computer." This became the final Tarepanda design.

== Reception ==
San-X did not have high expectations for the character when it was relaunched in 1998. And creator Hikaru Suemasa did not expect people to like the character, which she described as strange, as much as they did. But in February 1998, when San-X launched Tarepanda erasers and letter pads, they proved enormous hits. Before Tarepanda, the character stationery San-X sold was bought by women and children, but Tarepanda products also appealed to other demographics, like working men. Dedicated Tarepanda stores were also opened in Japan.

By 1999, sales of Tarepanda goods had reached 30 billion yen. And by 2000 they were up to 70 billion yen. The first, self-titled, Tarepanda picture book by Hikaru Suemasa was published in June 1999, and two months later it had already sold 250 000 copies, described as an "exceptional best-seller" for a picture book by The Asahi Shimbun. In 2010, Tarepanda and Rilakkuma, another San-X character, were described as "huge hits in Japan" by The New York Times.

San-X believed the early Tarepanda products were successful because they were released shortly after the 1997 Asian financial crisis, a time when many people in Japan were facing layoffs and, consequently, were sympathetic toward a "worn-out" panda character. Hikaru Suemasa said in 1999 that maybe people are exhausted, and that's why they appreciate characters that "do nothing but just stay by your side" and "It's not just being cute. There is something different - a relaxed look, powerless". Suemasa also said that San-X "worried because it doesn't look like it's alive" but that "this turned out to be one of the elements that made it sell."

== Books ==
Three picture books and one fanbook written and illustrated by Hikaru Suemasa were published in Japan by Shogakukan.

Tarepanda: Kyō mo Yoku Tareteimasu. (たれぱんだ: 今日もよくたれています。, transl. Tarepanda: Still Drooping a Lot Today.) from 1999 introduces the characteristics of Tarepanda, with numerous illustrations of how the characters move. It presents reports on different aspects of the Tarepanda characters, like how they play, the mystery of Tarepanda, and how to catch them.

Tarepanda no Hon: Taregoyomi - Nengara Nenjū Tareteimasu. (たれぱんだの本: たれごよみ 年がら年中たれています。, transl. Tarepanda Book: Droop Calendar - Drooping All Year Round.) from 1999 follows Tarepanda through the seasons and at seasonal events, like kagami mochi at new years, sakuramochi, Hinamatsuri, and Kodomo no hi in the spring, rainy season, morning glory flowers, going to the beach and Obon holiday in the summer, Tsukimi dango, reading, doing arts and sports in the fall, Christmas, ōsōji house cleaning and snow in the winter.

Tarezukushi ~Tarepanda Fanbukku~ (たれづくし～たれぱんだふぁんぶっく～, transl. All Kinds of Drooping - Tarepanda Fanbook) from 2000 includes yonkoma manga, photos of stationery, other merchandise, and from Tarepanda shops, reports on how Tarepanda was created, how the merchandise is manufactured, and photos of Tarepanda plush toys in various locations, like on a playgound, in a traditional Japanese room, and in New York.

Tarepanda no Hon: Tareyuku Mama ni Ki ga Tsuku to Soba ni Iru. (たれぱんだの本: たれゆくままに きがつくとそばにいる。, transl. Tarepanda Book: As It Goes On Drooping - Before You Know It, It's By Your Side.) from 2001 follows Tarepanda and the people it runs into as it moves through a realistically depicted city, encountering a salaryman helping it across the street, children hitting it with a soccer ball on a playground, an artist and kittens in the park, commuters in the subway, construction workers on a construction site, and so on, before finally being picked up by a policeman and returned to its original home.

== Media ==
A self-titled 30 minute long OVA with Tarepanda was produced by Bandai Visual in 2000. It includes short chapters showing the life of Tarepanda, animated in claymation and 2D animation. Katsushi Bōda (ja:保田 克史) who did the claymation work in the OVA, later worked on the San-X stop motion series Rilakkuma and Kaoru.

In 1999 Bandai released Tarepanda no Gunpei for their handheld WonderSwan console. It is a Tarepanda themed game in the Gunpey series of puzzle games, and includes a mode showing Tarepanda in different seasons. A special edition of the WonderSwan console with a Tarepanda theme was also sold bundled with the game.

In 2000 Bandai released a game for the PlayStation called Taregoro: Tarepanda no Iru Nichijō (たれごろ -たれぱんだのいる日常-, transl. Taregoro: Everyday Life With Tarepanda). In the game the player lives in a town with Tarepanda, and can interact with it and take pictures of it in various locations. The game also supports the PocketStation peripheral.

== Impact and legacy ==
Before Tarepanda, San-X characters were created for use on in-house produced products, primarily stationery but also zakka (miscellaneous goods.) Tarepanda was the first San-X character to be licensed to other companies, a business model that would grow to become central to San-X. As of 2020 about half of San-X products were licensed. Tarepanda also brought San-X into the production of stuffed toys, which, along with other household goods, represented 60-70% of San-X's sales as of 2020. Tarepanda was also a turning point where San-X started more long-lasting association with individual characters. San-X used to create logo designs and products with simple patterns alongside characters. But after Tarepanda they dedicated all their designers to character design.

Tarepanda has a different style from earlier San-X characters like Pencil Club, Pinny-Mu, and Kaijū Paradise, which had more of a simple cuteness, with easier to read facial expressions. The blank expression, soft pencil style and unobtrusive presence of Tarepanda was the origin of the style that would come to be seen as emblematic of San-X.

After San-X released the bear character Rilakkuma in 2003, Tarepanda started taking a backseat. By the 2020s Tarepanda was primarily associated with the Heisei era (1989–2019) and appeared in retro collections.

Yuri Yokomizo, who created the San-X characters Sumikko Gurashi in 2012, was a fan of Tarepanda as a child, and attended lectures with Hikaru Suemasa at university.

== List of media ==
=== Picture books ===
- Tarepanda: Kyou mo Yoku Tareteimasu. (Hikaru Suemasa, June 1999, ISBN 4-09-681211-0)
- Taregoyomi: Nengara Nenju Tareteimasu. (Hikaru Suemasa, September 1999, ISBN 4-09-681212-9)
- Taredzukushi: Tarepanda Fuanbukku (Hikaru Suemasa, March 2000, ISBN 4-09-681213-7)
- Tareyukumamani: Kigatsuku to Sobani iru (Hikaru Suemasa, April 2001, ISBN 4-09-681214-5)

=== Sticker books ===
- Tarepanda Shiiru (Hikaru Suemasa, March 2000, ISBN 4-09-734351-3)

=== Videos ===
- Tarepanda (Bandai Visual, VHS, 2000/7/25)
- Tarepanda (Bandai Visual, DVD, 2000/8/25)

=== Games ===
- Tarepanda no Gunpei (Bandai, WonderSwan, December 9, 1999)
- Taregoro: Tarepanda no Iru Nichijou (Bandai, PlayStation, August 31, 2000)

=== Computer ===
- Tarepanda (Interchannel, 2001/6/29, typing-tutor software)
- Tare Tsuzuri (Interchannel, 2001/11/22, card-creation software)
- Tarepanda Toissho (Fortyfive, 1999/4/16, desktop accessories)
- Tarepanda Toissho 2 (Fortyfive, 1999/8/10, desktop accessories)
- Tarepanda Toissho 3 (Fortyfive, 2000/4/28, desktop accessories)
- Tarepanda Toissho Tsume Awa Se (Fortyfive, 2002/2/8, desktop accessories)
