= Gudetama =

Sanrio fictional character

- Gudetama
- First appearance: 2013
- Created by: Amy, (Emi Nagashima (永嶋 瑛美))
- Voiced by: Shunsuke Takeuchi (Netflix series); Roger Craig Smith (English dub of Netflix series)

In-universe information
- Alias: lazy egg

Gudetama, (/ˌɡudɛˈtɑːmə/) stylized in all lowercase (Japanese: ぐでたま) is a fictional character created in 2013 by Amy, the nom de plume of Emi Nagashima (永嶋 瑛美), for Sanrio, and is a perpetually tired, apathetic anthropomorphic egg yolk. The name "Gudetama" is a portmanteau or blend word of the Japanese words for lazy (ぐでぐで, gudegude) and egg (たまご, tamago).

Originally targeted at the preadolescent market, Gudetama gained popularity among teens and adults for embodying the difficulties of surviving in modern-day society. As a result, the target group of Gudetama expanded to millennials. As of 2019, Gudetama was Sanrio's third most profitable character. Gudetama featured in an animated morning show in Japan on TBS from 2014 to 2020 and is the main character of the Netflix show Gudetama: An Eggcellent Adventure from 2022. Video games and comics based on the character have also been created. Airplanes and trains have been branded with Gudetama themed decor, and restaurants have served Gudetama-themed egg dishes. The character has featured on a variety of merchandise including apparel, stationery and toys.

== Creation and history ==
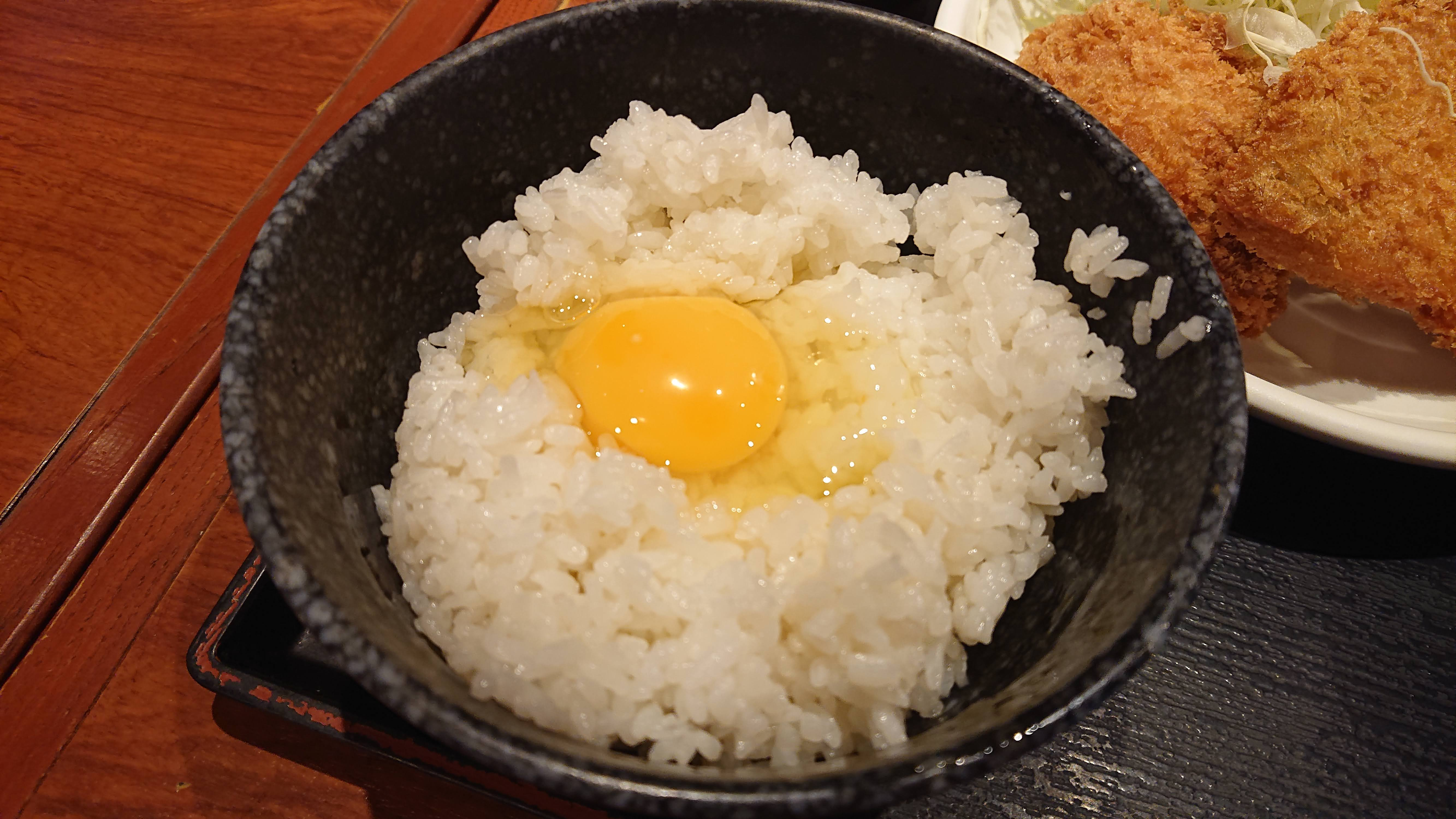
The designer Amy was inspired by the Japanese dish tamago kake gohan when she created Gudetama

Gudetama was created in 2013 by then-26-year-old Sanrio designer Amy, or Emi Nagashima (永嶋 瑛美, Nagashima Emi). The creation of Gudetama was inspired by an egg she was using to prepare tamago kake gohan for dinner after a long day at work. To her, the droopy look of the yolk seemed cute. She felt that the yolk looked like today's young people – feeling tired about life. Therefore, she designed an egg character and built its personality to attract millennials.

In 2013, Gudetama took part in a food-based competition held by Sanrio to inspire its designers and test out new characters. Gudetama came in second, with the winner of the competition being a cheerful salmon fillet named Kirimichan. Even though Gudetama was initially less popular than Kirimichan, it gained more popularity than the salmon character.

The name "Gudetama" is derived from two parts: the first is the ideophone gudegude (Japanese: ぐでぐで), which is used to evoke the impression of something lazy and lacking energy. The second part is from the Japanese word tamago (Japanese: たまご) which means egg. Therefore, Gudetama can be translated to English as "lazy egg".

As for its art style, Gudetama is marked by its simple line drawing, in keeping with the intention of using the character in anime for children, but which also allows easy mass production.

The first Gudetama animated series made its debut appearance in 2014 in a Japanese TBS TV program called Asa Chan! (あさチャン!, lit. "Morning chance!"), a morning family news section. Each episode of the series only lasts for approximately one minute, and as of 2019 there were over 1200 episodes. The series ended in 2020.

In Dec 2022, the official Sanrio Gudetama Twitter account had over one million followers, the most followed out of all Sanrio characters. In 2019, Gudetama was Sanrio's third most profitable character, behind Hello Kitty and My Melody.

== Appearances and characters ==
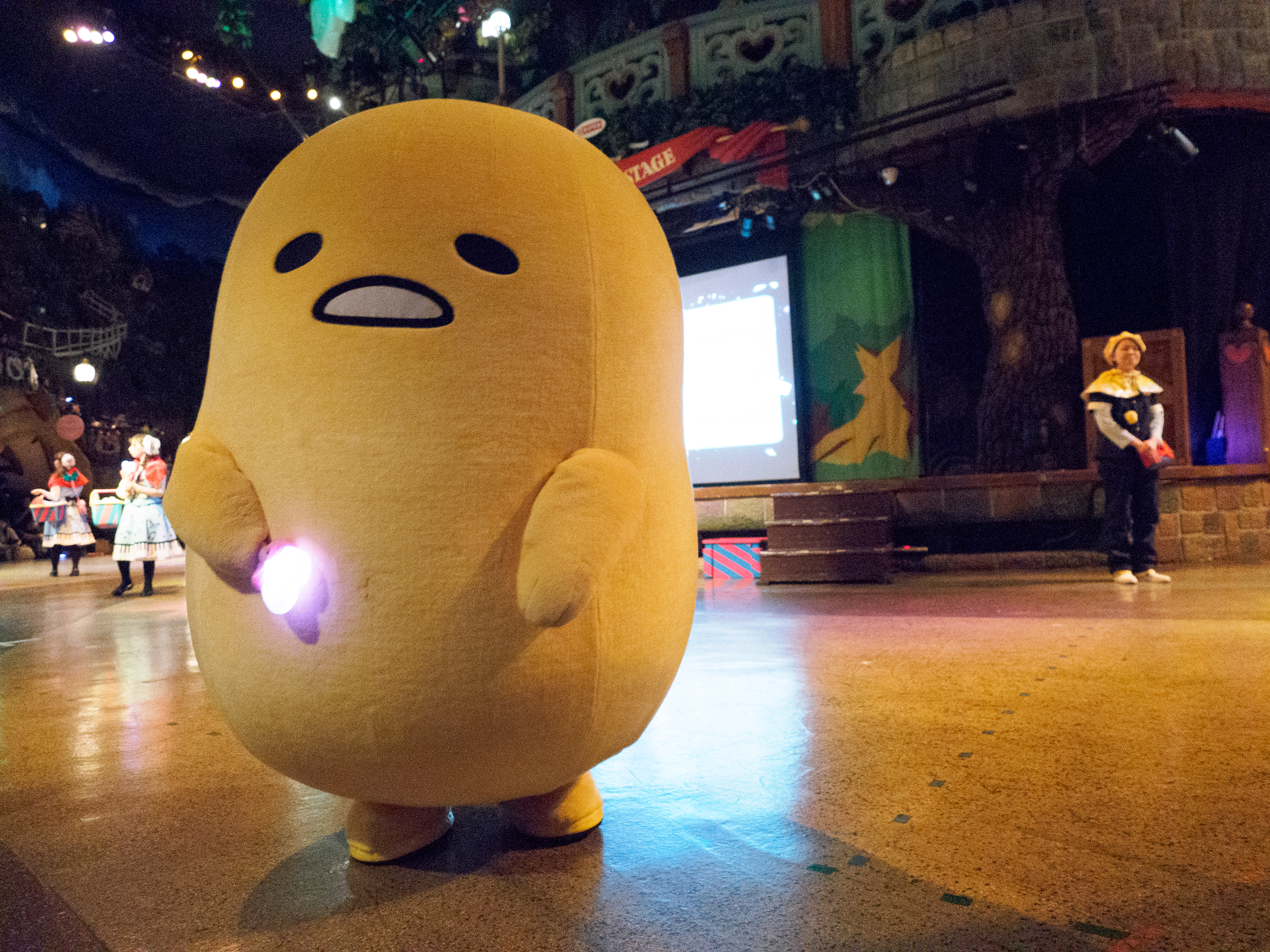
Gudetama at Sanrio Puroland

Gudetama is portrayed as a yellow yolk of a raw egg with prominent buttocks. It has a head with no neck and a body with limbs, but no fingers or toes. Its eyes are drawn like two ovals, appearing lazy. It has a mouth with a tongue but no obvious teeth. Often depicted laying on an egg white as a bed, while also using bacon as a blanket. Soy sauce is its favorite food and is one of the few things that can make it motivated. It sometimes uses its chalaza (the bands of tissue that hold the egg yolk in place) as a lasso or weapon by throwing it.

Shakipiyo (Japanese: しゃきぴよ) is a chick covered with yellow feathers and wearing an egg shell as pants. He is an energetic character whose hyperactivity made Gudetama feel pestered and harangued at first, but the two become best friends. Hardboiled (Japanese: ハードボイルド) is an egg character that is cooked as its name suggests, after boiling in hot water for more than 15 minutes. He is depicted as jaded and sometimes menacing with thick eyebrows. Guretama (Japanese: グレたま) is an egg that has become spoiled. Guretama is a yellow grey color, is usually surrounded by purple stink clouds, and has an irritated expression. He is grumpier and more aggressive than Gudetama.

== Background ==
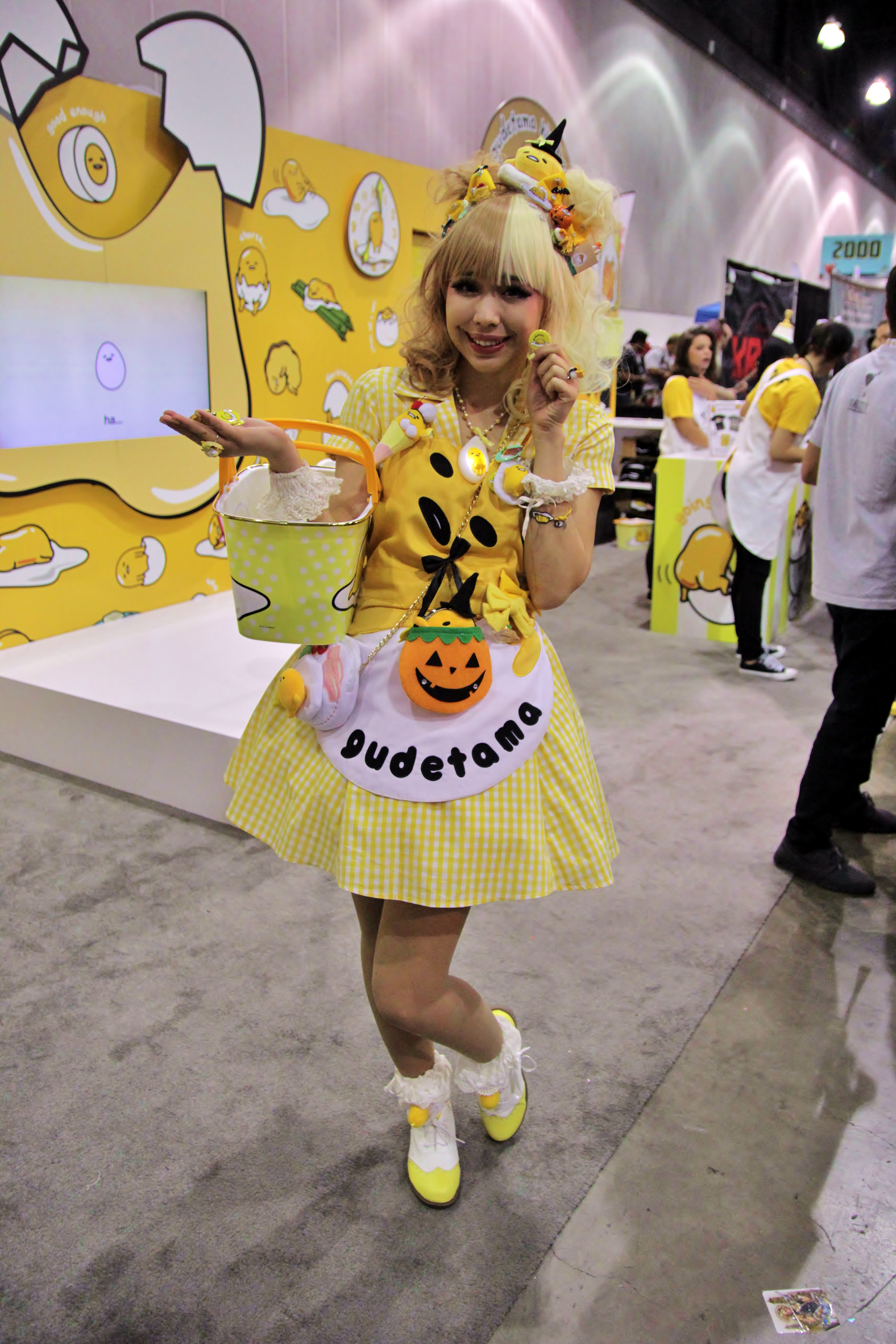
Cosplay of Gudetama at Comikaze Expo in 2015

Two factors can help explain Gudetama's popularity: Japan's kawaii (cute) culture, and the country's particular food culture.

Japan's popular culture has had earlier characters based on food, including Anpanman, a red bean superhero with an animated series that features various egg-based characters.

Other earlier food based characters, like Kogepan and Amagurichan, designed by the Japanese company San-X in 2000 and 2001, were portrayed as wishing to seem delicious and appealing, with much of their characterization and plots centering that wish. In contrast, Gudetama is depicted as having no such desire and actively resisting attempts to eat it. Instead, Gudetama is seemingly driven by its own internal whims with little attention to those around it.

Gudetama differs from other positive and adorable characters in Japan's kawaii culture, since Gudetama has gross aspects that places it in the kimo-kawaii category (which means "gross-cute" or "creepy-cute"). Gudetama's kimo-kawaii shows through its depression, which causes it to constantly complain about its hard life.

Gudetama's vocal protestations against its lot in life make it an uncharacteristic hit with the supposedly stoic and hardworking Japanese people. It has been suggested that Gudetama's popularity can be interpreted as signs of millennial disenchantment with work, as well as symptoms of depression. Translator Matt Alt commented that "using mascots such as Gudetama is a more nuanced way of expressing oneself than simply verbalizing an emotion or typing it out".

== Media ==
=== TBS TV series ===
A series of animated Gudetama shorts were broadcast on the Japanese channel TBS (Tokyo Broadcasting System) between 2014 and 2020. It aired daily as part of a morning family news section called Asa Chan! (あさチャン!, lit. "Morning chance!"). Episodes included a game called "Gudetama Chance!" where the audience used their remote controls to win prizes. Each episode and game segment only lasts for approximately one minute. As of 2019 there were over 1200 episodes.

The series follows the exploits of Gudetama and a cast of recurring human characters. One such character is Nisetama-san (ニセたまさん, Nisetamasan; meaning "fake egg"), a young man dressed in a yellow suit similar to a zentai suit but with the face exposed, akin to a humanoid Gudetama. The series' short segments end with a rendition of the Gudetama theme song and a contemporary style dance performed by Nisetama-san. There are also special stories about festivals.

=== Netflix series ===
A live action/CG animation hybrid television series called Gudetama: An Eggcellent Adventure was released in December 2022 on Netflix, with a total of 10 episodes. The series involves Gudetama and the chick character Shakipiyo searching across Japan for their mother. Shunsuke Takeuchi (Roger Craig Smith in the English dub) provides the voice for 24 different egg characters in the series, including Gudetama, while the voice of Shakipiyo is provided by Seiran Fukushima (Colleen O'Shaughnessey in the English dub). The theme song is performed by Yuko Hara from the band Southern All Stars.

=== Video games ===
There are two Japanese video games with Gudetama on the Nintendo 3DS, released in 2015 and 2016, and a Gudetama-themed Tamagotchi from 2017.

Gudetama Tap! is a mobile game released in 2019 and is a casual game or a collecting game. The game is simple but requires long waiting time, while this game is mainly about using various recipes to cook different kinds of Gudetama. A recipe requires long hours to wait can cook rare Gudetama, and players are aimed to collect all kinds of Gudetama as they can.

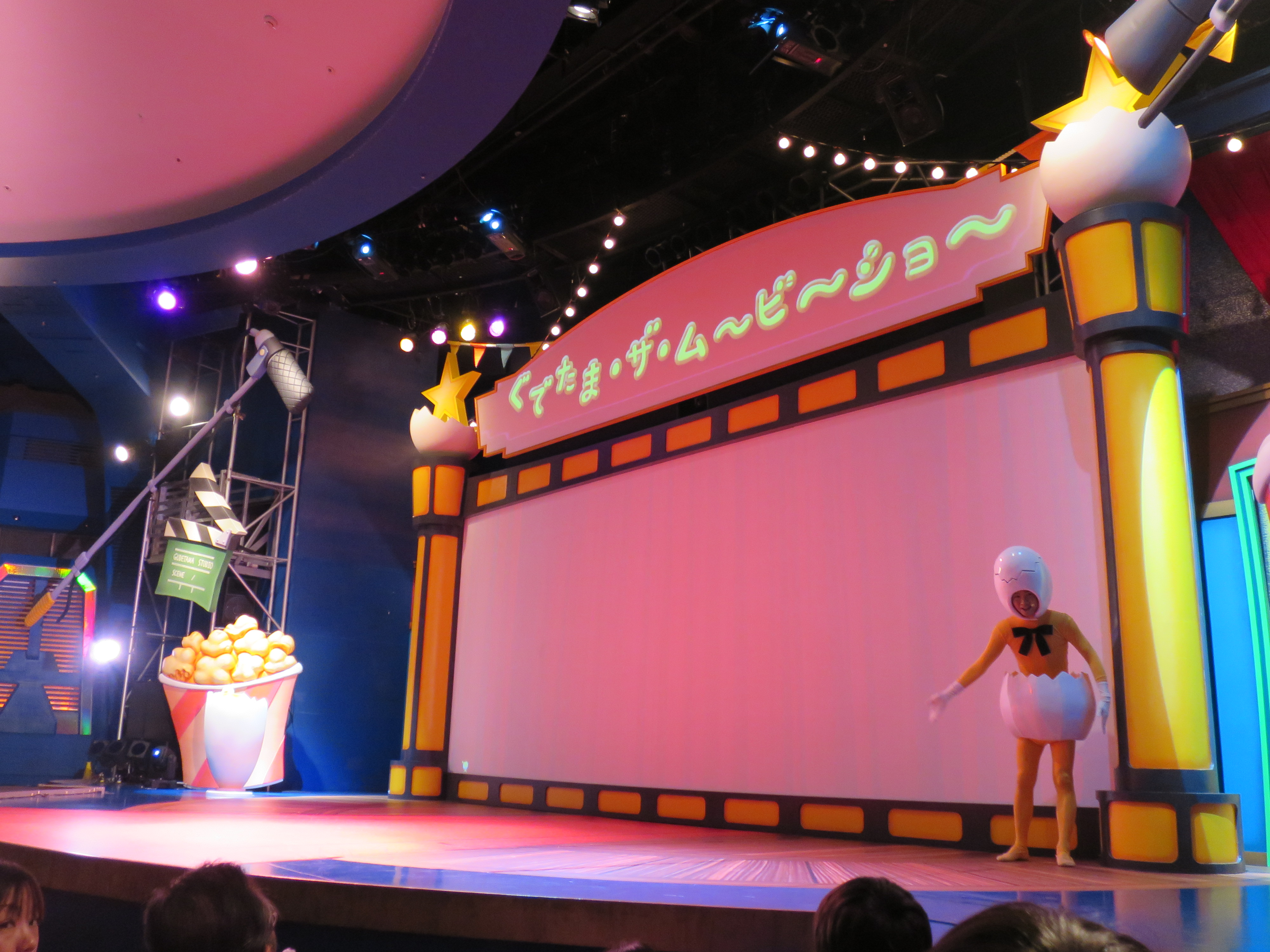
Gudetama show

Gudetama is a minor character in Hello Kitty Island Adventure on Apple Arcade that was released in 2023, where Pochacco challenges the player character to take photos of various meals around the archipelago that Gudetama are in.

In 2025 a game was released for the Nintendo Switch called "GUDETAMARUN" - Running GUDETAMA ! But GUDETAMA wants to be Gudegude ~. It is a side scrolling action game, and was published by OperaHouse.

=== Theme activities ===
In 2019, Sentosa, an island off the coast of mainland Singapore, got more than 800 Gudetama inflatables which were used to celebrated the annual Sentosa Funset.

== Products ==
Originally targeted at a preadolescent audience, the Gudetama market has expanded to include millennials, with exports to many countries such as China, Singapore, the UK, and South Korea. Within two years after the introduction of Gudetama, Sanrio has shipped nearly 2000 kinds of themed products in Japan, from pencils to suitcases.

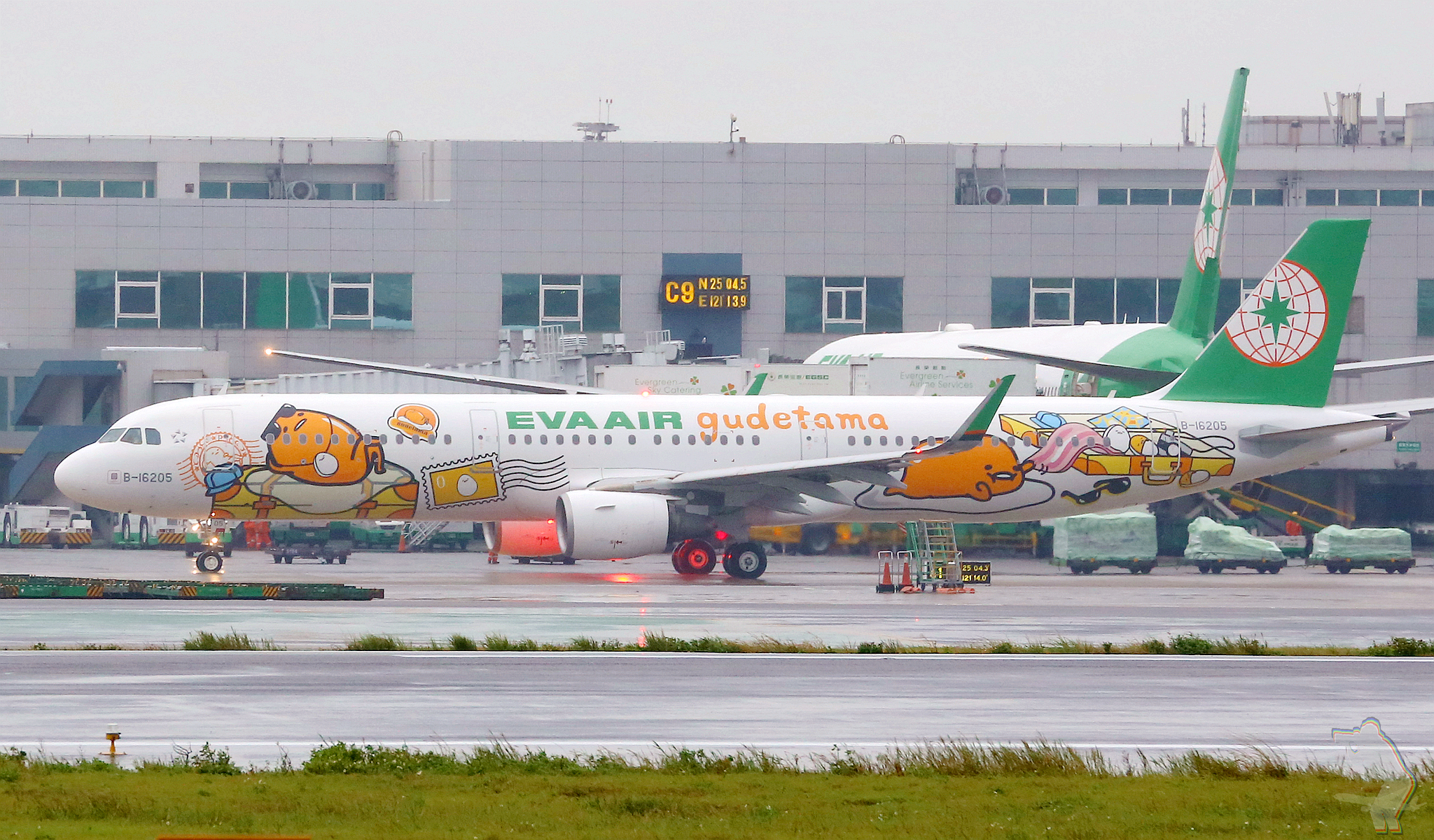
The Gudetama Airbus A321-200

=== Airliner ===
In November 2016, EVA Air launched a new Sanrio-themed airplane with a Gudetama theme. It is an Airbus A321-200 flying between Taiwan and Tokyo. Pillows and chairs are decorated with pictures of Gudetama with sunglasses, conveying a leisurely atmosphere.

=== Establishments ===
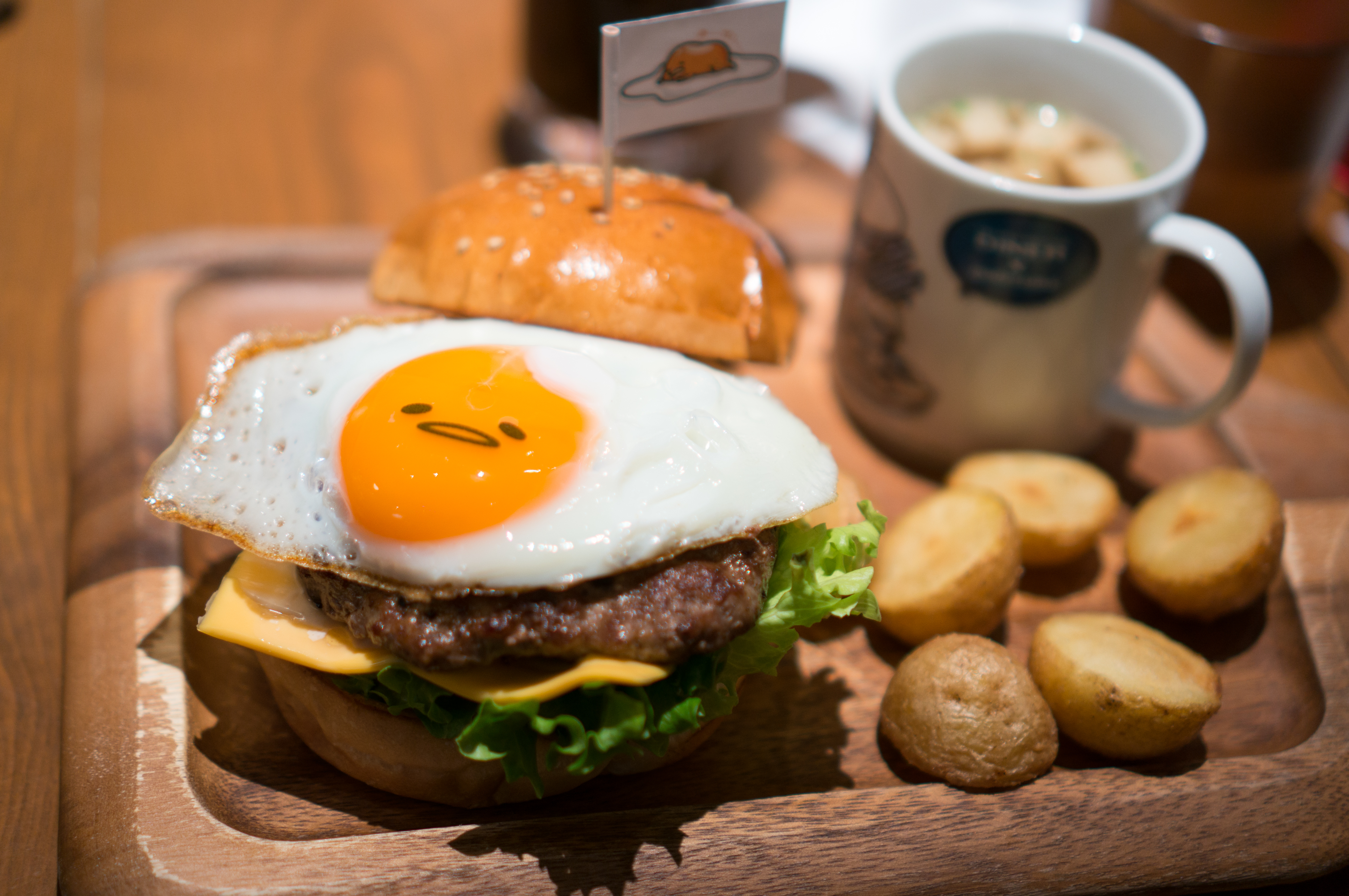
Food from VILLAGE VANGUARD DINER x Gudetama OKAWARI

There are Gudetama-themed restaurants in Japan, China, and London. The restaurants are decorated with the style of Gudetama, serving various egg dishes with the face of Gudetama to the customers. In 2014, Village Vanguard Diner Lumine Machida opened a limited time Gudetama-themed café, offering themed cakes, burgers, pudding, etc.

In 2016, Shoryu Ramen created a limited edition menu with dishes cooked to look like characters from the Gudetama series. Gudetama's face was painted on the bread of burgers and most of the dishes had egg as an ingredient.

=== Clothing ===
In March 2016, Taiwanese brand Stayreal collaborated with Gudetama, and listed limited edition T-shirts, caps, cups, masks, and other products.

In April 2019, Stayreal had a second collaboration with Gudetama, adding the female brand Rockcoco. The collaboration was centered around the theme "Lazy is the new busy".

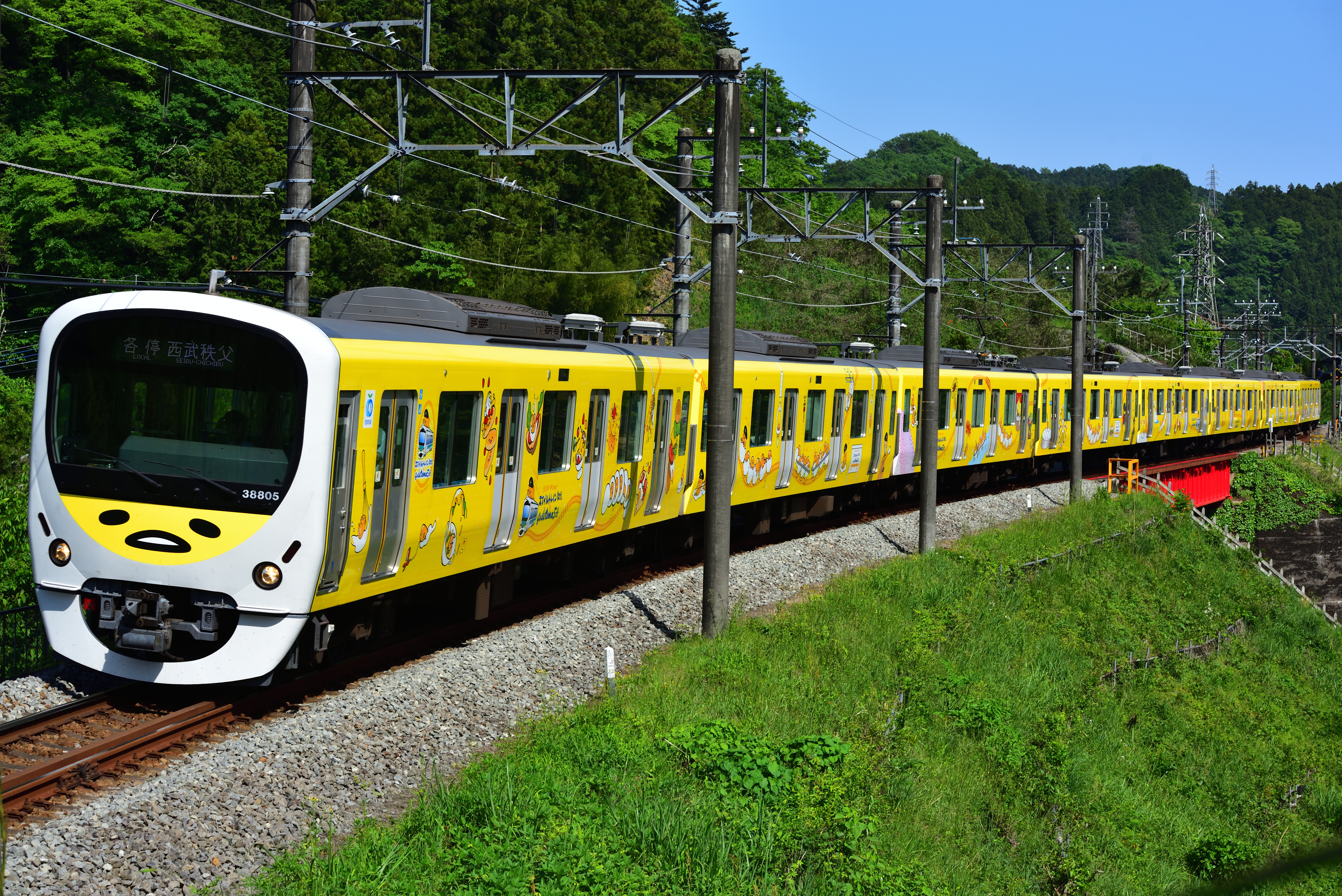
Seibu 30000 series gudetama small train

UNIQLO has collaborated with Sanrio to include Gudetama T-shirts.

Anwar Carrots has released Gudetama collaboration items such as bum bags, hats and shirts.

=== Train ===
In 2018, Seibu Railway created a Gudetama-themed train. This train ran along Shinjuku Line and the Haijima Line from mid-August to November; it was then on the Seibu Ikebukuro Line until the end of December 2018. The entire train was painted yellow, with Gudetama's face featured on the front and back. Inside the train, large Gudetama fixtures were added to the sides of seats and from above the racks.
