= Gesshizu =

Group of fictional characters

Gesshizu characters in 2022

Gesshizu (げっしーず, Gesshiizu) are a group of mysterious iyashikei video game characters, who resemble different rodents and are different colors, but all have prominent front teeth. They were created in 2018 as a joint project between the Japanese companies San-X and Nippon Columbia. The name Gesshizu comes from the word gesshirui (げっしるい, rodent). The characters hatch from eggs and are based on rodents like the Japanese dwarf flying squirrel, octodon, and capybara. Between 2018 and 2022 three Gesshizu Nintendo Switch games were developed and published in Japan by Nippon Columbia. One of the games was also released internationally in 2023 by Aksys Games. In 2020 a mobile game app, also by Nippon Columbia, was released. A Gesshizu novelization was published in Japan in 2019, and two different manga series have been serialized in Japanese magazines.

== Creation ==
Gesshizu were created in 2018 as a joint project between the Japanese companies San-X, known for designing characters like Rilakkuma, and Nippon Columbia, who developed and published the Gesshizu games. Shiroi Omochi (しろいおもち), a designer at San-X who previously worked Sumikko Gurashi designs, was involved in the creation of the Gesshizu character designs. The name Gesshizu derives from the Japanese word gesshirui (げっしるい) which means rodent. The suffix zu (ず) comes from the English plural s, and is used to indicate plurality; that Gesshizu are a group.

== Characters ==
Gesshizu are a group of mysterious iyashikei (healing) characters, who resemble different animals and are different colors, but all have prominent front teeth. They are depicted as hatching from eggs, with all having the same round shape right after hatching. As they mature they obtain their full adult form and color pattern. The characters, which are mostly based on rodents, include Risu (りす) (squirrel) who is always happy and full of energy, Usagi (うさぎ) (rabbit) who often gets lonely and cries, Nezumi (ねずみ) (rat) who is timid and restless and trembles a lot, Deguu (でぐー) (octodon) who is a leader who brings everyone together, Momonga (ももんが) (Japanese dwarf flying squirrel) who loves cute things, Biibaa (び～ば～) (beaver) who is free-spirited and naps a lot, Hamusutaa (はむすた～) (hamster) who is an easygoing glutton, Yamaarashi (やまあらし) (porcupine) who dreams of being cool, Kapibara (かぴばら) (capybara) who is absent-minded yet dependable, and Chinchira (ちんちら) (chinchilla) who can build anything, and is a character that was added to the third game.

== Video games ==
Three games for the Nintendo Switch have been released, where the player takes care of the Gesshizu. They were all developed and published in Japan by Nippon Columbia.

The first game, Gesshizu: Gajigaji Nakama wo Sodateyou (げっし～ず がじがじなかまをそだてよう, transl. Gesshizu: Let's Raise the Nibbling Friends) was released in Japan in 2018. It is a virtual pet type game where the player raises the characters from eggs to collect all the different types of Gesshizu. It received a score of 28/40 from Famitsu, with reviewers saying the game is cute and soothing, but also repetitive.

The second game, Gesshizu: Mori no Chiisana Nakama-tachi (げっし～ず 森の小さななかまたち, transl. Gesshizu: Little Friends of the Forest) was first released in Japan in 2020, and then released internationally in 2023 by Aksys Games, under the title Cuddly Forest Friends, without Gesshizu branding. In this game the goal is to grow a Tree of Happiness by taking good care of the Gesshizu. It received a score of 30/40 from Famitsu, with reviewers appreciating the cute facial expressions of the characters, the heartwarming quality of the game, but also noting that the difficulty level is low. Siliconera gave it a score of 7/10, mentioning that the variety of mini-games is a positive, but also that some of the pacing is slow.

In the third game, Gesshizu: Minna de Chokomaka Muradukuri (げっし～ず みんなでちょこまか村づくり, transl. Gesshizu: Everyone Gets Busy Building a Village) released in Japan in 2022, the player helps the Gesshizu to build a village. It received a score of 29/40 from Famitsu, with the reviewers agreeing on the cuteness of the characters and items, but having a split opinion on the amount of variety the game provides.

In addition to the Nintendo Switch games, there is a mobile game app for iOS and Android from 2020, also by Nippon Columbia, called Gesshizu to Ki no Ouchi (げっし〜ずと木のおうち, transl. Gesshizu and the Tree House).

== Other media ==
A Gesshizu novelization with the title Gesshizu: Minna Chigau Kedo, Minna Nakayoshi (げっし～ず ～ みんなちがうけど、みんななかよし ～, transl. Gesshizu: Everyone's Different, But Everyone's Friends) was published by Shueisha in Japan in 2019. It was written by Yoshinao Shimada (しまだよしなお) who produced the first Gesshizu game, and illustrated by Shiroi Omochi (しろいおもち), a designer at San-X who worked on the Gesshizu character design. A Gesshizu manga has been serialized in Ciao magazine, with story by Shio Ebina (ja:えびなしお) and illustrations by Pochi Kashiwa (ja:柏ぽち). Another manga was serialized in Ne-Ne (ja:ね〜ね〜) magazine.
