= San-X =

Japanese stationery company

San-X characters in 2024, including Kogepan, Kutsushita Nyanko, Sumikko Gurashi, Afro Ken, Pinny-Mu, Sentimental Circus, Rilakkuma, Monokuro Boo, Kaijū Paradise, Nyan Nyan Nyanko, Mamegoma, and Tarepanda

San-X (サンエックス, San Ekkusu) is a Japanese company known for creating and marketing kawaii (cute) characters like Rilakkuma. Their closest competitor is the larger Sanrio company, which created Hello Kitty. San-X characters are usually anthropomorphic representations of animals or inanimate objects. They are typically laid-back or lazy, often a bit mysterious or have insecurities. Since 1979 San-X have produced over 1000 different characters. In the 1980s, in their early days of character creation, San-X produced only stationery, and created several new characters every month. In 1998 Tarepanda was created by Hikaru Suemasa (末政ひかる) and by 1999 sales had reached 30 billion yen. It was such a success that it changed San-X from a stationery company to a full-time character development and licensing company. They shifted to increasingly producing toys and merchandise, as well as media like books, video games and anime. The blank expression and unobtrusive presence of Tarepanda was also the start of the character style that would become typical of San-X.

In 2003, Aki Kondo created Rilakkuma, San-X's most successful character to date, which by the end of 2016 had earned more than 250 billion yen. In 2019 the series Rilakkuma and Kaoru began streaming on Netflix. In 2012, Sumikko Gurashi was created by Yuri Yokomizo, growing to be worth about 20 billion yen a year as of 2019, with animated theatrical feature films being released. As of 2020, 60–70% of San-X sales were stuffed toys and household goods, with about half the products being licensed. San-X have gradually changed to investing more deeply in individual characters, and as of the 2020s they were aiming to release one or two new characters per year. They were also increasingly creating characters in collaboration with others, and for use in media products, like the characters in the Chickip Dancers anime from 2021.

== History ==
San-X was founded in April 1932 as a privately owned business under the name Chida Handler. In October 1941, Chida Handler became a limited company. In its early days San-X primarily produced writing paper and envelopes with elaborate designs, selling to stationery stores. Chida Handler's name was changed to San-X in 1973. The name San-X was derived from an earlier logo, which was a row of three X characters. San is three in Japanese. The X in the logo is often illustrated as an anthropomorphic four leafed clover.

The first original San-X character was Rompish Clown in 1979. In their early days of creating characters, San-X was still purely a stationery company. The market demand at the time was for stationery with a variety of designs. San-X created 2-3 new characters every month, and according to one San-X representative, up to about 30 characters some months. Some hits from this era include Aquamarine from 1980, Pencil Club from 1984, Pinny-Mu from 1987, and Kaijū Paradise from 1988. Withnews describe these early characters, like Kaijū Paradise, as having more of a simple cuteness, with easier to read facial expressions, compared to the characters that would later be seen as typical of San-X. For these early characters, in addition to stationery, San-X also started producing zakka, or miscellaneous goods, like piggy banks, mugs and lamps, but everything was still produced in-house. From 1989 to 1995, San-X were selling Esparks, a manga series printed on stationery. It was the first San-X series aimed at boys and was a bit hit. Two Esparks video games were also released.

Tarepanda was created by Hikaru Suemasa (ja:末政ひかる) and released in 1998, and by 1999, sales of Tarepanda merchandise had reached 30 billion yen. It was such a success that it changed San-X itself, from a stationery company to a full-time character development and licensing company. Tarepanda was the first San-X character to be licensed to other companies, and also brought San-X into the production of stuffed toys, both of which would grow to become central to their business model. San-X used to design logos and stationery with simple patterns alongside characters. But after the Tarepanda success they dedicated all their designers to character designs.

Tarepanda had a different style than earlier San-X characters. The blank expression and unobtrusive presence of Tarepanda became the origin of the style that would come to be seen as emblematic of San-X. In the years following Tarepanda, several characters that went on to become hits were released, like Buru Buru Dog, Nyan Nyan Nyanko, Afro Ken, and Mikanbouya. In the year 2000 Miki Takahashi (ja:たかはしみき, Takahashi Miki) created Kogepan, which was adapted to an anime series in 2001. Between 2000 and 2002 games for the PlayStation with Tarepanda, Afro Ken and Kogepan were released.

In 2003, Aki Kondo created Rilakkuma, San-X's most successful character to date, which by the end of 2016 had earned more than 250 billion yen. Rilakkuma plush toys were a big hit, and helped established plush toys as central to San-X. In 2019, a stop motion animated series featuring Rilakkuma, called Rilakkuma and Kaoru, began streaming on Netflix. In 2005, Mamegoma was created by Mayumi Yonemura (ja:ヨネムラマユミ) and in 2009 it was adapted to an anime series. From 2005, games with San-X characters began to be released for Nintendo consoles, beginning with Nyan Nyan Nyanko and Rilakkuma games for the Game Boy Advance. Between 2007 and 2010, games were released for the Nintendo DS with Rilakkuma, Mamegoma, Kamonohashikamo, Kutsushita Nyanko, Monokuro Boo, and Kireizukin Seikatsu.

In 2010 The New York Times described San-X as a smaller, nimbler company, with potential to surpass the Sanrio corporation. The San-X characters Tarepanda and Rilakkuma were described as "huge hits in Japan" that were rising in the Character Databank character popularity charts while Sanrio's Hello Kitty character slumped in popularity, especially in Japan. As of 2019 San-X had about 35 designers, growing to 40 in 2022-2023, most of whom were women. Over time, San-X began to develop a deeper and more long-lasting association with individual characters. As of the 2020s San-X was aiming to release one or two new characters per year. And as of 2020 60-70% of San-X's sales were stuffed toys and household goods, with about half the products produced in-house and half being licensed. In 2022 San-X established an overseas business department aiming to expand internationally.

In 2012 Sumikko Gurashi were created by Yuri Yokomizo, who since childhood was a fan of Tarepanda, and while at university attended lectures with its creator Hikaru Suemasa. Beginning in 2019 several animated theatrical feature films with Sumikko Gurashi were released. As of 2019, sales of Sumikko products were worth about 20 billion yen a year. In 2018, the Gesshizu group of characters were developed as a joint project between San-X and Nippon Columbia, who released three Gesshizu games for the Nintendo Switch between 2018 and 2022. Shiroi Omochi (しろいおもち), a designer who previously worked on Sumikko Gurashi designs, was involved in the creation of the Gesshizu character designs. The short anime Chickip Dancers aired for three seasons between 2021 and 2024. The Chickip Dancers characters were developed by San-X and launched with the anime, rather than as stationery products, exemplifying the shift of San-X from a stationery company to a character creation company. In 2026 it was announced that an area called San-X Paradise is planned for construction at the Fuji-Q Highland amusement park in Japan.

== Characters and products ==
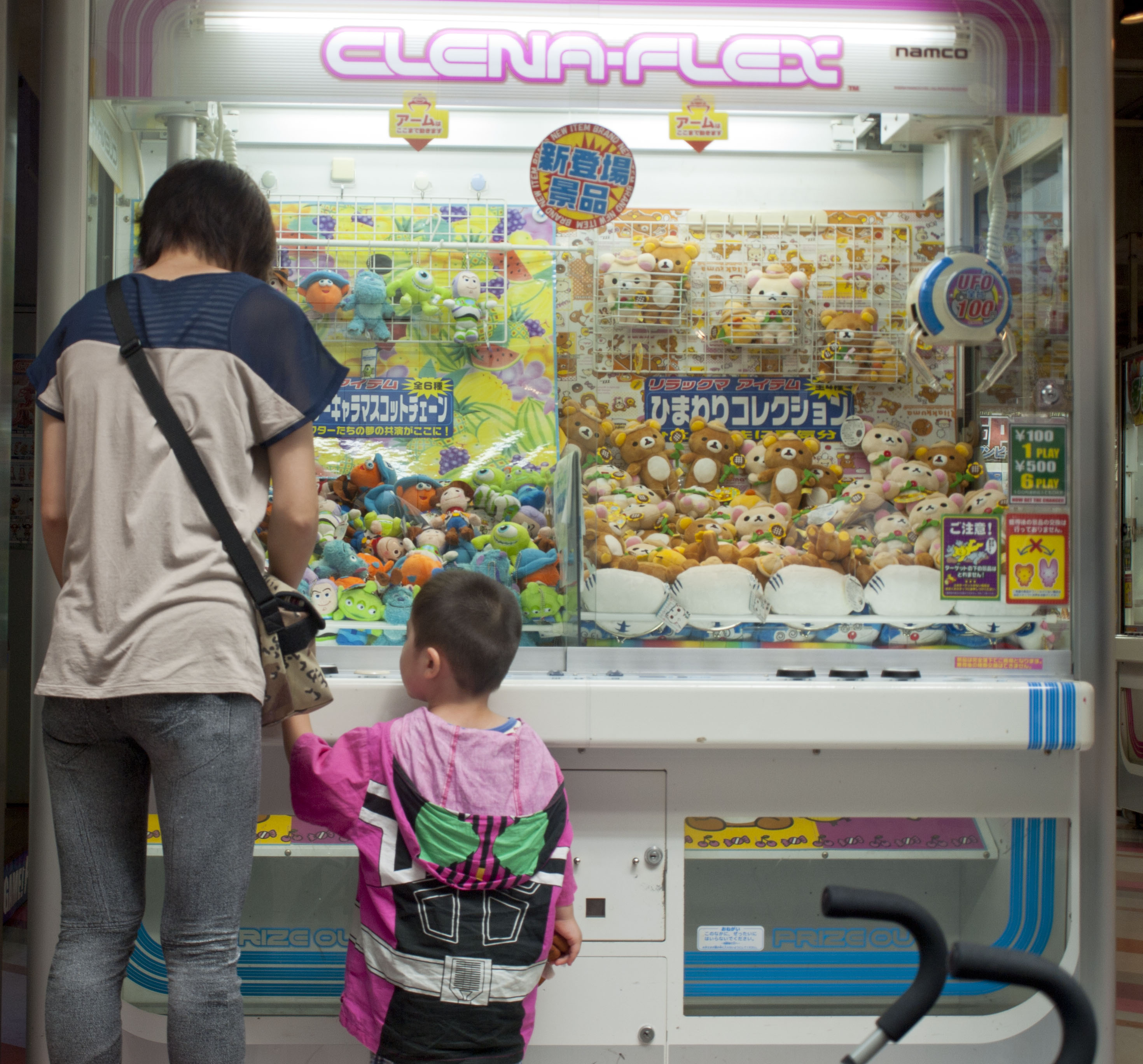
A claw machine with plush Rilakkuma toys

Between 1979 and 2022 San-X created 1000 original characters. They have been described as different from similar kawaii characters from other companies, coming across as apathetic or lazy, and often having some kind of insecurity. Representatives for San-X have said that the characters are often mysterious and have few defined traits, leaving room for imagination and exploration of the characters' backstories. For example, San-X has said that Tarepanda is not an actual panda but "a creature that resembles a panda", and that Rilakkuma's appearance is a costume with a zipper in the back, while the true nature of the character is unknown. San-X characters generally do not have voices, although some of them speak in text form.

In 2020 Withnews said that San-X characters' uniqueness is "that they aren't particularly lively" and "this has an oasis-like appeal in modern society". San-X head designer Hikaru Suemasa said in 1999 that maybe people are exhausted, and that's why they appreciate characters that "do nothing but just stay by your side" and "It's not just being cute. There is something different – a relaxed look, powerless".

As of 2022–2023 San-X had about 40 designers, most of whom were women. The designers create original characters as well as designs for stationery and other merchandise. Even new hires were encouraged to create original characters. As of the 2020s San-X was creating about 200 new types of characters in-house yearly, holding in-house competitions five times a year, with the aim of selecting only one or two new characters per year to release publicly. Much of the creation of new characters is left up to the individual designer's sensibilities, though San-X has some guidelines, and depictions of alcohol, tobacco and violence are not allowed. San-X does not advertise new characters in newspapers or on television, but they rely on in-store marketing. Representatives for San-X have described the characters' immediate visual appeal and ability to evoke emotions as central.

San-X characters can be found on stationery, as keychains and stuffed toys. They are sold as blind boxes, gashapon and in UFO catchers and other prize machines in Japan's arcades. There are also animation, video games and books featuring the characters. Aside from the video games with individual characters listed below, San-X released three games for the Nintendo DS with a variety of characters between 2006 and 2008. The mobile game Sumi Sumi from 2018 also features a variety of San-X characters.

The list below is chronological and contains media like books, video games, and animation with each character.

=== 1979–1989 ===
Rompish Clown (ロンピッシュクラウン) (1979) was the first original San-X character, a circus clown with designs decorated by stars. Typical stationery products like letter sets, pencil caps and pencil cases with Rompish Clown were sold by San-X. The items were sold with the slogan Hajikeru rizumu, piero ga odoru, aka to kuro no hāmonī (はじけるリズム ピエロが踊る赤と黒のハーモニー, transl. Popping rhythm, a dancing clown, a harmony of red and black).

Aquamarine (アクアマリン) (1980) is a series of marine animals like dolphins and whales. The design was changed to be more colorful and eye-catching, and it became an early hit for San-X.

Pencil Club (ペンシルクラブ) (1984) are two preschool child characters drawn in crayon style with pastel colors, a boy called Santa kun (さんたくん) and a girl called Pun chan (ぷんちゃん). They were created to take advantage of the trend of matching pairs at the time. The characters were a hit of the era, and in addition to stationery, there were also Pencil Club lunch boxes and piggy banks.

Pinny-Mu (ピニームー) (1987) is a bear character, drawn with a bold ink outline. The character was selected in an in-house competition. It became a hit, and the range of products expanded to include mugs and drinking glasses.

Kaijū Paradise (カイジュウパラダイス) (1988) is a monster and space themed group of characters, with the main character named Gao Gao-kun (ガオガオくん). Kaijū (かいじゅう) means monster. A similar monster character was released by San-X a year earlier, in 1987, under the name ぼく かいじゅうです (Boku Kaijū Desu, I am Monster), but Kaijū Paradise was more successful. Products like a lamp and candy with Kaijū Paradise were released. The Kaijū Paradise characters and settings were developed in detail, and manga with Gao Gao-kun was created. Withnews described Kaijū Paradise as having more of a simple cuteness, compared to the characters that would later be seen as typical of San-X.

Esparks (ja:エスパークス, Esupākusu) (1989) is a stationery manga series by Hiroshi Soya (征矢浩志, Soya Hiroshi) about a boy hero named Esparks saving the world from destruction. It was originally printed in 1989–1995 on stationery sold by San-X, like notebooks and pencil cases. It includes manga that can be played like sugoroku, a type of board game. Esparks manga was also serialized in CoroCoro Comic. Two Esparks video games were released, one for Game Boy in 1992, and one for Super Famicom in 1995. It was the first San-X series aimed at boys, and got so popular that some schools banned Esparks stationery. In 2009, a revival compilation book was published of the manga that had previously been printed as stationery.

=== 1998–2005 ===
Tarepanda (1998) is a panda-like character. Created by Hikaru Suemasa (ja:末政ひかる). Three picture books and a fanbook by Suemasa were published in Japan. A Tarepanda video game was released for the WonderSwan in 1999, and another one for the PlayStation in 2000. A Tarepanda OVA was released in 2000. Tarepanda was a major success and by 1999, sales of Tarepanda merchandise had reached 30 billion yen. The success of Tarepanda changed San-X from a stationery company to a full-time character creation and licensing company. The blank expression and unobtrusive presence of Tarepanda was the origin of the style that would come to be seen as emblematic of San-X.

Buru Buru Dog (ぶるぶるどっぐ) (1999) is a small white dog character who cannot stop trembling no matter what happens. Buruburu (ぶるぶる) is Japanese onomatopoeia for trembling. The original draft for the character was created by Hikaru Suemasa who also created Tarepanda. Three Buru Buru Dog picture books with text and illustrations by Yukiko Hirano (ひらのゆきこ, Hirano Yukiko) were released in the year 2000. Described as a hit of the era by Withnews.

Kogepan (2000) is a depressed burnt red bean bread bun who lives in a bakery. Created by Miki Takahashi (ja:たかはしみき, Takahashi Miki) in 2000. Adapted to a short anime series in 2001. A number of Kogepan manga and picture books by Takahashi have been published in Japan. A Kogepan PlayStation game was released in Japan in 2002. Over two million plush Kogepan toys have been sold, and book sales reached over 1.3 million combined copies. The manga series was revived in 2020, when a new manga serialization began in Nene (ja:ね〜ね〜) magazine. A Kogepan book was published in Japan in 2021 with a mix of new and old reworked material.

Nyan Nyan Nyanko (ja:にゃんにゃんにゃんこ) (2000) are small, usually white kitten characters that are depicted imitating various items, most commonly food. The term nyan (にゃん) is a Japanese onomatopoeic word for a cat's meow. Ko (こ) is a word which in Japanese connotes with child or young. Together they make a childish/cutesy word for kitten. The characters were created by Misuzu Nakajima (なかじまみすず, Nakajima Misuzu). Nakajima chose to create cat characters because of the popularity of cats. The first drafts were of tabby cats, because she owned a tabby cat at the time. She tried drawing cats wrapped in nori seaweed, and decided to make the cats white, to use them in place of rice in illustrations. Tabby cats still appear in some design themes, like Okonomi Nyanko which imitate Okonomiyaki. The first released version of the characters was called Nyankomaki, and showed them imitating maki sushi rolls. Memo pads and similar items with this design were released in 1999.

The name Nyan Nyan Nyanko was first used in 2000, and a variety of design themes with the characters were released between 2000 and 2007. Themes showing the Nyanko imitating foods include Nyanko Chaya, an Ochaya or traditional tea house, Nyanko Cafe, which includes cream puff pastries often used in illustrations, Nyanko Yasumi, typical summer holiday foods, Nyanko Restaurant, with gratin and wine, and Nyanko Burger, fast food hamburger and fries. Non-food related themes include Nyanko Onsen, a hot spring theme, Nyanko Gakkou, where the Nyanko are shown imitating school related items, and Nyanko Land, an amusement park theme. Five picture books with Nyan Nyan Nyanko by Nakajima were published in Japan between 2001 and 2007. Similar to the themes used for merchandise, the books are also centered around different themes, including Ochaya teahouse, Cafe, Onsen hot spring, sightseeing tour, and Nyanko Land amusement park themes. In 2003, Nyanko themed avatars were released for the game portal Hangame. In 2005 a video game called Nyan Nyan Nyanko no Nyan Collection (にゃんにゃんにゃんこのにゃんコレクション) for the Game Boy Advance was released in Japan by MTO. The game is set in Nyanko Village where the imitation loving Nyanko live. The player uses dice to move around on a sugoroku style board game, with play elements including quizzes and mini games, like puzzles and rock paper scissors. For clearing games, the player gets Nyanko Cards to complete the Nyanko Imitation Album. Nyan Nyan Nyanko were described as a hit of the era by Withnews, and they subsequently appeared in retro collections in the 2020s.

Afro Ken (ja:アフロ犬) (2001) is a dog with a colorful afro that changes color depending on its surroundings. Ken is one of the readings of 犬 which means dog. Created by Aimi Tetsuro (あいみてつろう). A self-titled 3DCG animated Afro Ken OVA was released in 2001, produced by the studio Sunrise. It consists of a variety of different contents, including segments explaining the Afro Ken character, 3DCG short stories, some of which are surreal, with Afro Ken and similar dog characters, and an interview with Tetsuro. A soundtrack CD with music from the OVA was also released. A video Game called Afro Ken The Puzzle (アフロ犬 The パズル) was released for the PlayStation in 2001. It is a tile matching puzzle game, where the player matches different colored Afro Ken characters. It was released by D3 Publisher as part of their Simple series of budget games. Four picture books by Tetsuro featuring Afro Ken were published in Japan, including wimmelbilderbuch type books. Afro Ken was described as a hit of the era by Withnews, and subsequently appeared in retro collections in the 2020s.

Amagurichan (あまぐりちゃん) (2001) is a chestnut character. あまぐり(甘栗) (amaguri) are roasted Chinese chestnuts of the tenshin (天津) variety. Ama (あま) is short for あまい, sweet. The original character design was created by Miki Takahashi (ja:たかはしみき, Takahashi Miki), who also created Kogepan. Two Amagurichan books were published in Japan in 2002 and 2003, with text and illustrations by Aki Kondo, who went on to create Rilakkuma. Amagurichan, along with Kogepan, is depicted as having a strong wish to be eaten.

Koya Inu (小屋犬, Koya Inu) (2001) is a dog who has a roof on its head. A Koya Inu picture book by Mayumi Yonemura (ヨネムラマユミ) was published in Japan in 2001.

Mikanbouya (ja:みかんぼうや) (2001) is a group of citrus fruit characters. The main character Mikanbouya is a satsuma mandarin, known as mikan (みかん) in Japanese. Bouya (ぼうや) is a colloquial version of boy. According to the backstory, Mikanbouya dreams of becoming a frozen mandarin (ja:冷凍みかん). Created in 2001 by Aki Kondo, who would later create Rilakkuma. She was inspired by her love of citrus fruit since childhood. Five picture books by Kondo featuring Mikanbouya were published in Japan between 2002 and 2005. Described as a hit of the era by Withnews.

Shiawase Nyanko (しあわせにゃんこ) (2001) is a group of cats who want to make people happy. Two books by Tomoko Matsui (まついともこ) were published in Japan in 2002.

Cheese Family (チーズ一家, Chīzu ikka) (2002) is a group of cheese characters. Two picture books by Tomoka Tamiya (たみやともか) were published in Japan in 2003 and 2005, with a third book in 2019.

Nagomimakuri (なごみまくり) (2002) is a mysterious character who resembles a Japanese giant salamander. It has a rounded shape and lives deep in the forest in clear streams. It leads a placid, carefree life and moves around slowly and calmly. San-X describes it as a relaxing and de-stressing character. The name is a combination of 和む (nagomu) and まくる (makuru) that roughly translates to "intensely calming". A picture book by Shigeko Nagasawa (ながさわ しげこ) featuring Nagomimakuri was published in Japan in 2002.

Nijinomukou (ニジノムコウ) (2002) is a group of animals, drawn in a more sketchy style. "Niji no mukō" means the other side of the rainbow. A picture book by Mitsuko Ishizu (いしづ みつこ) was published in Japan in 2003.

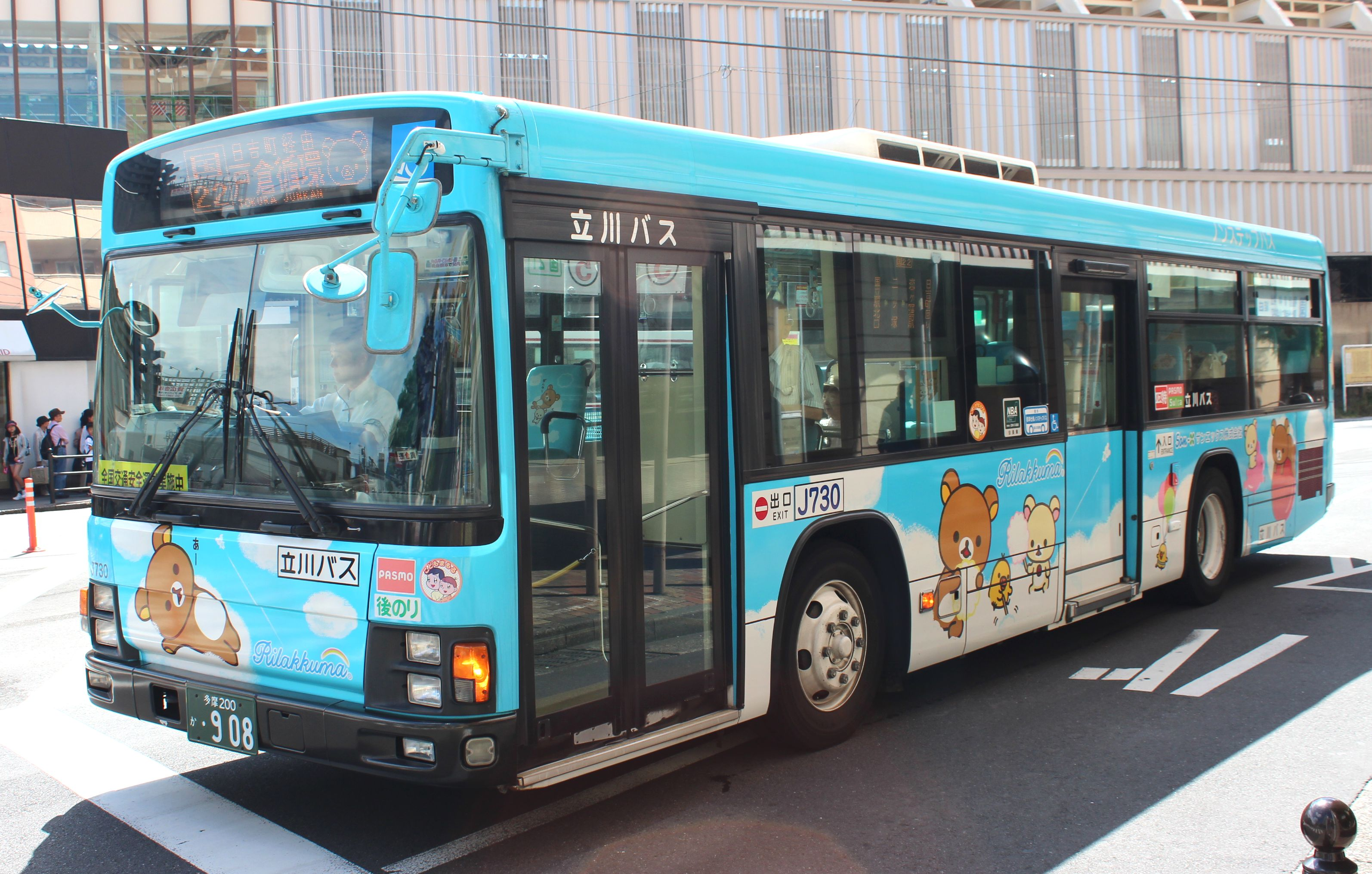
A Tokyo bus with Rilakkuma themed decor

Rilakkuma (2003) is a brown bear who lives in the house of an office lady (OL) named Kaoru. Created by Aki Kondo. Numerous books with Rilakkuma by Kondo have been published in Japan. Several Rilakkuma video games have been released for Nintendo systems, beginning with the Game Boy Advance in 2005. A stop motion animated series called Rilakkuma and Kaoru began streaming on Netflix in 2019. In May 2010, Rilakkuma ranked as the fifth most popular character in Japan in a survey of the Character Databank. By the end of 2016, Rilakkuma had earned more than 250 billion yen.

Yōguru-kun (ヨーグルくん) (2003) is a yogurt character. A picture book by Misuzu Nakajima (なかじまみすず, Nakajima Misuzu) featuring Yōguru-kun was published in Japan in 2004.

Momobuta (ja:ももぶた) (2004) is a pig with a head shaped like a peach, who enjoys karaoke and painting her nails. Momobuta was released in 2004 as a media mix collaboration between San-X and Sega Toys. A manga by Tomomi Fukube (ja:福米ともみ) was serialized in Ribon magazine beginning in 2004, with Sega Toys selling a related fortune teller toy. A Momobuta picture book by Yumiko Takeuchi (タケウチ ユミコ) was published in Japan in 2005.

Necorin (ねこりん) (2004) is a group of playful cats. A picture book by Tomoko Oshino (おしのともこ) was published in Japan in 2005.

Mamegoma (まめゴマ) (2005) is a series of seal characters created by Mayumi Yonemura (ja:ヨネムラマユミ). They are depicted as small enough to live in a goldfish bowl. A 2009 Mamegoma anime series called Kupū~!! Mamegoma! (クプ～！！まめゴマ！) was produced by TMS Entertainment. Four Mamegoma Nintendo DS games were released in Japan between 2007 and 2010, and two 3DS games in 2012 and 2013. The first and second DS games shipped a combined total of over 250 000 copies. Several picture books and manga by Yonemura featuring Mamegoma have been published in Japan. The first four books shipped 300 000 copies in total.

Monokuro Boo (2005) are two square shaped pigs, one black and one white. There is usually a bee buzzing around them, and the phrase "Simple is Best" or "Are you happy?" Two Monokuro Boo picture books by Atsuko Hoshino (ホシノアツコ) were published in Japan in 2006 and 2007. A Nintendo DS game was released in 2009. San-X has also created a spin-off line of products which features smaller, pastel or candy-colored pigs known as Baby Boo (ベビーブー).

Neko no Panya (ねこのパンヤ) (2005) is a cat's bread shop. A picture book by Naoko Okada (おかだなおこ, Okada Naoko) featuring Neko no Panya was published in Japan in 2008.

Wanroom (ワンルーム) (2005) is a collection of household items with dog faces. Their slogan is "Let's enjoy Wanroom life!" Each Wanroom character has a name like Inusofa (a couch), Wano'clock (an alarm clock) and Sabowan (a cactus). A Wanroom picture book by Yumiko Takeuchi (タケウチユミコ, Takeuchi Yumiko) was published in Japan in 2006.

=== 2006–2010 ===
Jewel Cat (ジュエルキャット) (2006) is a pretty cat whose eyes are made of jewels and who lives in a jewel box. A picture book by Naoko Okada (おかだ なおこ) was published in Japan in 2010.

Tohoho na Dog (トホホな犬) (2006) is a dog with a tire on its head. Two picture books by Aimi Tetsuro (あいみてつろう) featuring Tohoho na Dog were published in Japan in 2005 and 2007.

Tsugi no Hi Kerori (ja:次の日ケロリ) (2006) (a frog of tomorrow) Kerori is a frog who is either white or green depending on its mood. Three picture books by Yumiko Takeuchi (タケウチユミコ, Takeuchi Yumiko) with Kerori were published between 2006 and 2008.

Kamonohashikamo (かものはしかも。) (2007) is a yellow animal character with a beak. He might be a platypus but he is unsure. He is unsure and undecided about most things. "Kamonohashi" is Japanese for platypus, and "kamo" (かも) is short for "perhaps" or "might be", so a rough translation of the name would be "A platypus, perhaps?" Six volumes of Kamonohashikamo yonkoma manga by Chiaki Abe (あべ ちあき) were published in Japan between 2008 and 2013. A video game was released for the Nintendo DS in 2009 called Kamonohashikamo. Aimai Seikatsu no Susume (かものはしかも。 あいまい生活のすすめ, transl. Kamonohashikamo. Advice for an Ambiguous Life). Kamonohashikamo was one of the characters included in themes and emojis released for Windows Live Messenger in 2007.

Kutsushita Nyanko (ja:靴下にゃんこ) (2007) is a black cat character named Bon Chan who wears white socks. Friends with Norucchi, a smaller fluffy yellow cat. Kutsushita (靴下) means socks and nyanko (にゃんこ) is a childish way of saying cat. Seven picture books by Yoshie Toya (トヤ ヨシエ) were published in Japan between 2008 to 2014. A video game was released for the Nintendo DS in 2009 called Kutsushita Nyanko ~ Shiroi Kutsushita o Haita Neko to Kurashi Hajimemashita.~ (靴下にゃんこ～白い靴下をはいた猫とくらしはじめました。～, transl. Kutsushita Nyanko: Life with a Cat Who Wears White Socks Has Begun).

Sabokappa (サボカッパ) (2008) is a kappa combined with a cactus. The character was a collaboration project with the Japanese publisher Shufu To Seikatsu Sha (ja:主婦と生活社). Three Sabokappa picture books by Motoko Abe (あべ もとこ) were published by Shufu To Seikatsu Sha in Japan between 2009 and 2011.

Kireizukin Seikatsu (ja:きれいずきん生活) (2009) is a lazy raccoon named Mar who transforms into the hard-working cleaner Kireizukin when wearing a red hood. Similar to あかずきん (Akazukin), the Japanese name for Little Red Riding Hood, きれい (kirei) ずきん (zukin) means clean/tidy hood and 生活 (seikatsu) means living or daily life. Two Kireizukin Seikatsu picture books by Chiaki Abe (あべ ちあき) were published in Japan in 2009 and 2010. Two self-titled Kireizukin Seikatsu games for the Nintendo DS were released in 2010 and 2011. In 2010 Kireizukin Seikatsu appeared in a collaboration quest in the MMORPG ROSE Online.

Iiwaken (いいわけん) (2010) is a Shiba Inu. A manga with Iiwaken by Imako (イマコ) was published in Japan in 2016.

Omusubiyasan (おむすびやさん) (2010) is a character series where the setting is a vendor that sells omusubi (rice balls) with different types of Omusubi characters. A picture book by Mayumi Morita (モリタ マユミ) was published in Japan in 2005.

Sentimental Circus (ja:センチメンタルサーカス) (2010) is a group of worn out and forgotten stuffed toys who run a circus at night. Their leader is the pink patchwork rabbit character Shappo. Beginning in 2011, several books by Haruko Ichikawa (市川 晴子) have been published in Japan, including four picture books and two volumes of manga. According to a 2017 report in Japan, the popularity of Sentimental Circus was on par with that of Rilakkuma and Sumikko Gurashi.

=== 2011–2020 ===
Chocopa (チョコパ) (2011) is a panda who eats so much chocolate that she sometimes turns into a brown bear. A picture book by Chiaki Abe (あべ ちあき) was published in Japan in 2012.

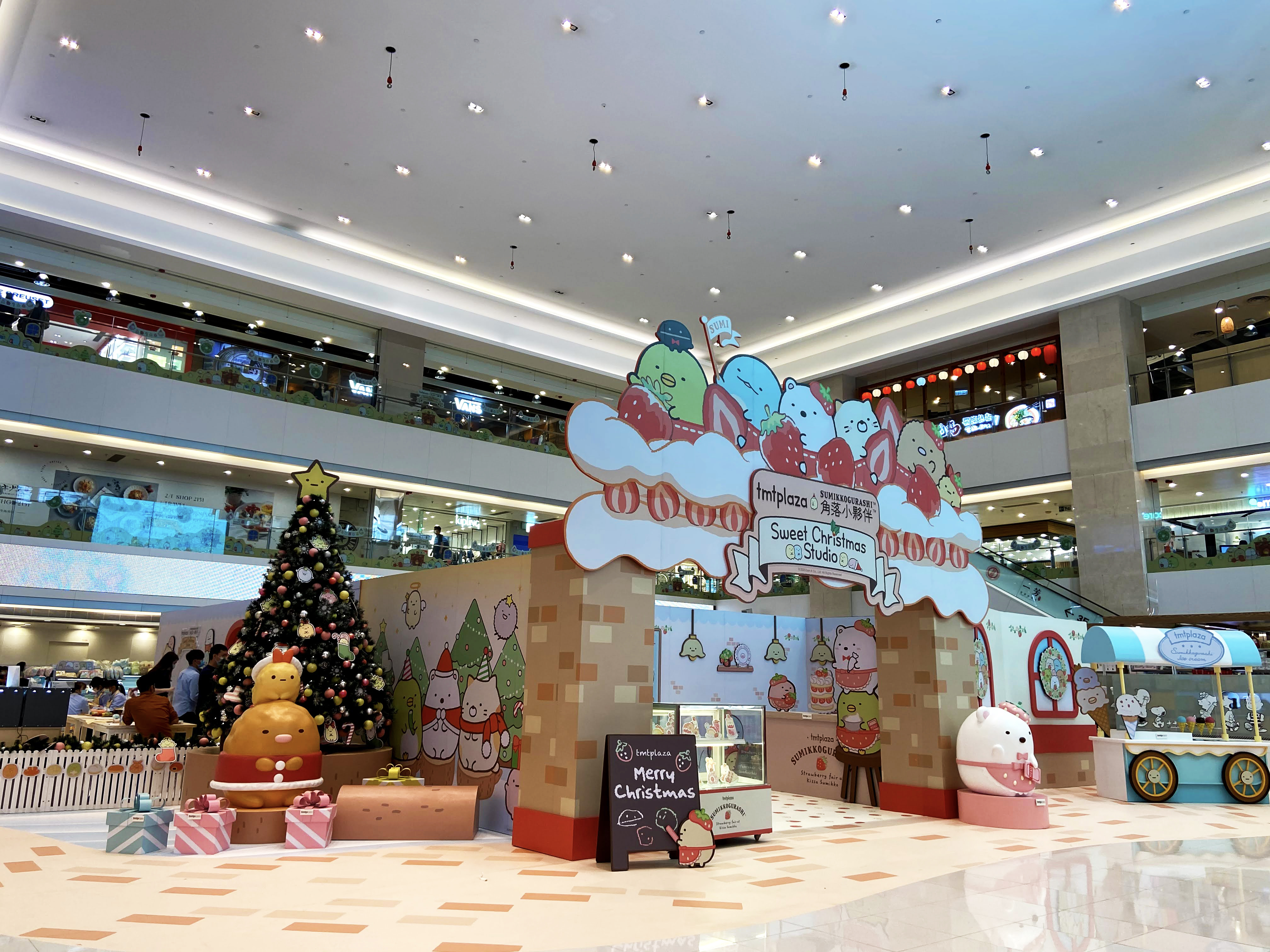
A Sumikko Gurashi themed Christmas display in a mall in Hong Kong in 2020

Sumikko Gurashi (2012) is a group of animals (and food items) with personality issues that like corners. Created by Yuri Yokomizo in 2012, and beginning in 2019 several animated theatrical feature films with the characters were released. Numerous Sumikko Gurashi books have been published beginning in 2014, including several picture books by Yokomizo. There have also been several Nintendo 3DS, Nintendo Switch, and mobile games. According to San-X, in 2015, Sumikko Gurashi stood for 30% of sales of their original merchandise or about 5 billion yen. As of 2019, sales of Sumikko Gurashi products were worth about 20 billion yen a year. Eight million plush toys and 3 million books had been sold. Sumikko Gurashi was ranked #10 in 2016, and #5 in 2018 on character popularity charts from Bandai, based on surveys of parents of children under 12 in Japan. In 2019, Sumikko Gurashi won the Grand Prize at the Japan Character Awards.

Jinbesan (じんべえさん) (2015) is a whale shark character that swims silently in the sea, with many friends gathering around it to relax. The name comes from jinbesame (ジンベエザメ), the Japanese name for whale shark. The creation of Jinbesan was inspired by the large size and elegance of a whale shark at an aquarium. The first product was a market test memo pad which sold well. Two Jinbesan picture books, with yonkoma manga, by Yumiko Takeuchi (タケウチユミコ) were published in Japan in 2019 and 2022. Jinbesan manga has been serialized in Nene (ja:ね〜ね〜) magazine, where Jinbesan was also consistently voted among the top five characters. The character also appeared in collaborations with aquariums, and at a Jinbesan themed cafe at Iwashita's New Ginger museum (ja:岩下の新生姜ミュージアム).

Corocoro Coronya (ころころコロニャ) (2017) is a cat who hides in a corone bread. Two books with Corocoro Coronya by Komugiko (こむぎこ) were published in Japan in 2018 and 2020.

Funwari Necoron (ふんわりねころん) (2017) is a group of round fluffy cat characters, who have tails with a light fragrance of things like flowers, soap and berries. ふんわり (funwari) is an emphasized version of ふわり (fuwari) which means soft and fluffy, and ねころん (Necoron) is a combination of neko (ねこ, cat) and koron (コロン, cologne). In 2019 a board book was published called Funwari Nekoron: Yasashī Kaori no Mārui Koneko (ふんわりねころん: やさしいかおりのまぁるいこねこ, transl. Funwari Nekoron: Round Kittens with a Gentle Scent). It contains yonkoma manga, profiles of the characters and activity book type elements. In 2024 A yonkoma manga book by Yuki Fuwa (ふわゆき, Fuwa Yuki) with the title Funwari Necoron: Fuwatto Kaoru Yasashī Kimochi (ふんわりねころん ふわっとかおるやさしいキモチ, transl. Funwari Necoron: A Gently Fragrant Soft Feeling) was published in Japan. The book follows the daily life of the characters through the four seasons.

Gesshizu are a group of mysterious iyashikei (healing) characters, who resemble different rodents and are different colors, but all have prominent front teeth. They were created in 2018 as a joint project between San-X and Nippon Columbia. Shiroi Omochi (しろいおもち), a designer at San-X who previously worked Sumikko Gurashi designs, was involved in the creation of the Gesshizu character designs. The Gesshizu characters are depicted as hatching from eggs and are based on rodents like the Japanese dwarf flying squirrel, octodon, and capybara. Between 2018 and 2022 three Gesshizu games for the Nintendo Switch and a mobile game app were released. A Gesshizu novelization was published in Japan in 2019. A Gesshizu manga has been serialized in Ciao magazine. Another manga was serialized in Nene (ja:ね〜ね〜) magazine.

=== 2021– ===
Kokoroaraiguma (ココロアライグマ) (2020) is a racoon character who washes sadness away. The name of this character was decided before the appearance. A book with Kokoroaraiguma was published in Japan in 2022.

Chickip Dancers (ja:チキップダンサーズ, Chikippu Dansāzu) (2021) is a group of anthropomorphized food characters who dance. Characters include Chicken Bone (ほねチキン), a bone-in chicken, Candy Apple (りんごあめ), a candy apple, Kushikatsu (くしかつ), a kushikatsu deep fried meat skewer, and Coach Skipping Frog (スキップガエル先生) a frog who is the group's dance teacher. The short five minutes per episode anime series Chickip Dancers aired for three seasons on NHK Educational TV from 2021 to 2024. It was produced by Fanworks and was the first terrestrial broadcast TV anime with San-X characters. A Chickip Dancers video game for Nintendo Switch and a soundtrack CD were released in 2022. Several children's books based on the characters were published in Japan by Shogakukan between 2022 and 2024.

Kumausa (くまうさ) (2022) is a rabbit character who is big like a bear. The name is a combination of kuma (くま, bear) and うさ (usa) short for usagi (うさぎ, rabbit). In 2022 a Kumausa picture book was published in collaboration with the YouTuber エミリン (Emirin) (ja:大松絵美) called Kumausa Mimichan Iyaiya Dotchi? (くまうさミミちゃん いやいやどっち？, transl. Kumausa Mimi-chan: No, No, Which One?). Kumausa is an example of a character developed by San-X that was launched as a media product, rather than as stationery.

Ishiyowa-chan (いしよわちゃん) (2024) is a dog character who is self-indulgent and gives up easily. The name is a colloquial version of ishi ga yowai (意志が弱い, weak-willed). A book called Ishiyowa-chan: Ashita no Jibun ni Makasemasu (いしよわちゃん 明日のじぶんにまかせます, transl. Ishiyowa-chan: I'll Do It Tomorrow) was published in 2025. It follows Ishiyowa-chan at the office and at home, and includes an advice column. Realsound (ja:リアルサウンド) recommended the book for people who feel fatigued. Ishiyowa-chan gained 65 000 followers on X (formerly Twitter) within nine months of release. Temporary Ishiyowa-chan themed cafes were opened in 2025 in Tokyo and Osaka.

Sugarcocomuu (シュガーココムー) (2024) is a cotton candy rabbit character who minds a sweets shop. A children's novel with Sugarcocomuu was published in Japan in 2024.

== Works cited ==
- サンエックス90周年 みんなの生まれたところの話 うちのコたちの大図鑑 たれぱんだ・リラックマ・すみっコぐらし - 主婦と生活社 [San-X 90th Anniversary - Stories of All Their Origins - A Big Encyclopedia of Our Kids - Tarepanda Rilakkuma Sumikko Gurashi] (in Japanese). 主婦と生活社. 8 August 2022. ISBN 9784391158502.
