= Rilakkuma and Kaoru =

Japanese television series

- Kanji: リラックマとカオルさん
- Genre: Stop-motion animation; Slice-of-life
- Created by: Aki Kondo
- Written by: Naoko Ogigami
- Directed by: Masahito Kobayashi
- Starring: Mikako Tabe
- Ending theme: "Sampo" by Quruli
- Composer: Shigeru Kishida
- Country of origin: Japan
- No. of seasons: 2
- No. of episodes: 21

Production
- Executive producers: Hiroshi Chida; Kaata Sakamoto; Masao Chida; Taro Goto
- Producers: Hiroki Ito; Noriko Matsumoto; Yuriko Okada
- Running time: 12 minutes
- Production companies: San-X; dwarf studio

Original release
- Network: Netflix
- Release: April 19, 2019 – August 25, 2022

Rilakkuma and Kaoru (リラックマとカオルさん, Rirakkuma to Kaoru-san) is a Japanese stop-motion animated television series created by Dwarf Studio in cooperation with San-X, based on the Rilakkuma character franchise.

The series premiered on Netflix on April 19, 2019. In October 2020, it was renewed for a second season, titled Rilakkuma's Theme Park Adventure (リラックマと遊園地, Rirakkuma to Yūenchi), featuring the same production staff. Rilakkuma's Theme Park Adventure was released worldwide exclusively on Netflix on August 25, 2022.

== Characters ==
Rilakkuma (リラックマ, Rirakkuma)
Voiced by: Michihiko Hagi (Japanese); Cam Clarke (English)
A soft, toy-like brown bear whose interests are mostly limited to sleeping and eating. He appeared in front of Kaoru's apartment one day and started living with her afterwards.
Korilakkuma (コリラックマ, Korirakkuma)
Voiced by: Hikaru Midorikawa (Japanese); Jim Cummings (English)
A small, toy-like white bear and Rilakkuma's close friend. She also appeared at Kaoru's front door one day and began living with her too.
Kiiroitori (キイロイトリ)
Kaoru's pet yellow chick. Rather than sleeping and eating like Rilakkuma, Kiiroitori has a hard-working nature and loves cleaning.
Kaoru (カオルさん, Kaoru-san)
Voiced by: Mikako Tabe (Japanese); Lana Condor (Rilakkuma and Kaoru); Abby Trott (Rilakkuma's Theme Park Adventure) (English)
An office lady who lives with Rilakkuma, Korilakkuma and Kiiroitori.
Hayate (ハヤテくん, Hayate-kun)
Voiced by: Takayuki Yamada (Japanese); Chris Hackney (English)
A delivery man who is Tokio's cousin and Kaoru's love interest.
Tokio (トキオ)
Voiced by: Souki Matsumoto (Japanese); Veronica Taylor (English)
A lonely boy who lives in Kaoru's apartment complex.
Sayu (サユ)
Voiced by: Mai Kanazawa (Japanese); Melissa Fahn (English)
One of Kaoru's colleagues.

== Production ==
An initial pitch was made by Tokyo representatives at Netflix in 2016. The series was announced publicly in 2017 and was originally slated for a 2018 release.

Director Masahito Kobayashi drew inspiration from Wes Anderson's films, such as Fantastic Mr. Fox and Isle of Dogs. Kaoru, who had appeared as a silhouette in the original Rilakkuma comic series, was given a physical presence and her experiences were drawn from the female staff members. The fictional city that the show takes place in, Ogigaya, is a mash-up of the Ogikubo and Asagaya neighborhoods in Tokyo. The series was made at Dwarf Studio, who previously made stop motion Domo-kun animation. 10 separate stages were set up, with the staff filming about 10 seconds of footage per day simultaneously.

In 2018, Netflix announced the show would be released on April 19, 2019, and star Mikako Tabe as Kaoru. Original characters created for the series, Tokio, Hayate, and Sayu, were introduced in March 2019. Aside from playing Hayate, Takayuki Yamada also played an assortment of minor roles in the series, including the shaved ice stand man in episode 4, the man in the Yuriko horror movie, Kaoru's landlord, Kaoru's boss, the fisherman in episode 8, the photographer in episode 10, and the alien in episode 11.

== Episodes ==
Series overview
Season	Title	Episodes	Originally released
1	Rilakkuma and Kaoru	13	April 19, 2019
2	Theme Park Adventure	8	August 25, 2022

=== Season 1 (2019) ===
No. overall	No. in season	Title	Directed by	Written by	Original release date
1	1	"Cherry Blossom"; Transliteration: "Hanami" (Japanese: 花見)	Masahito Kobayashi	Naoko Ogigami	April 19, 2019
In April, Kaoru prepares for a hanami with her circle of friends from college, only to find out that none of them can attend. Rilakkuma, Korilakkuma, and Kiiroitori take her out for a viewing at night.
2	2	"Kidnapped"; Transliteration: "Koinobori" (Japanese: こいのぼり)	Masahito Kobayashi	Naoko Ogigami	April 19, 2019
In May, Kaoru is harassed by anonymous messages and Rilakkuma is kidnapped. Kaoru discovers the culprit is Tokio, a lonely boy living in her apartment complex. Kaoru forgives him and invites him to help set up the koinobori.
3	3	"Rainy Season"; Transliteration: "Tsuyu" (Japanese: 梅雨)	Masahito Kobayashi	Naoko Ogigami	April 19, 2019
In June, Kaoru overhears her co-workers mentioning she is too serious for a group date. Heavy rain causes mushrooms to grow in her house, and she considers eating them to change her personality.
4	4	"Fireworks"; Transliteration: "Natsu Matsuri" (Japanese: 夏祭り)	Masahito Kobayashi	Naoko Ogigami	April 19, 2019
In July, Kaoru attends the summer festival, and Rilakkuma helps her become less indecisive.
5	5	"Ghost Girl"; Transliteration: "Obon" (Japanese: お盆)	Masahito Kobayashi	Naoko Ogigami	April 19, 2019
In August, the typhoon season approaches and a ghost girl visits Kaoru's apartment. Kaoru offers her advice to move on.
6	6	"Fortune-Telling"; Transliteration: "Uranai" (Japanese: 占い)	Masahito Kobayashi	Naoko Ogigami	April 19, 2019
In September, Kaoru becomes concerned about her fortune and begins buying items she believes will improve her luck, which causes tension between herself and her animal friends. After discovering the fortune teller is a scammer, Kaoru apologizes and realizes she is lucky after all.
7	7	"Slim Down"; Transliteration: "Daietto" (Japanese: ダイエット)	Masahito Kobayashi	Naoko Ogigami	April 19, 2019
In October, Kaoru and Rilakkuma gain weight, causing Kaoru to buy exercise equipment. After discovering that Hayate delivers her packages, she begins buying more equipment to see him, causing her bills to skyrocket. In the end, Kaoru and Rilakkuma lose weight from eating frugally.
8	8	"Getting a Job"; Transliteration: "Arubaito" (Japanese: アルバイト)	Masahito Kobayashi	Naoko Ogigami	April 19, 2019
In November, Kaoru becomes concerned about money as her winter bonus is cut by 10% and she is notified that the apartment complex will be demolished next year. Rilakkuma, Korilakkuma, and Kiiroitori get jobs to help, but Rilakkuma is fired from all of them. Kaoru apologizes for making them worry and doesn't accept their money, saying that the landlord will compensate them.
9	9	"Snowman"; Transliteration: "Yukidaruma" (Japanese: 雪だるま)	Masahito Kobayashi	Naoko Ogigami	April 19, 2019
In December, Korilakkuma and Kiiroitori make snowmen. Rilakkuma gets sick and has a dream where he plays with them at night.
10	10	"Hawaii"; Transliteration: "Hawai" (Japanese: ハワイ)	Masahito Kobayashi	Naoko Ogigami	April 19, 2019
In January, Rilakkuma and friends recreate a luau for Kaoru, but Kaoru tells them she'd rather go to Hawaii with her future partner. Their performance goes viral on the Internet and they are invited to perform in Hawaii, but they decide to take Tokio with them instead of Kaoru.
11	11	"Sleepless Night"; Transliteration: "Hoshizora" (Japanese: 星空)	Masahito Kobayashi	Naoko Ogigami	April 19, 2019
In February, Korilakkuma attempts to contact aliens and meets one in a dream-like sequence.
12	12	"The First Day"; Transliteration: "Deai" (Japanese: 出会い)	Masahito Kobayashi	Naoko Ogigami	April 19, 2019
In March, Kaoru reflects on the first time Rilakkuma and Korilakkuma first appeared in her apartment a year ago.
13	13	"Moving Out"; Transliteration: "Hikkoshi" (Japanese: 引っ越し)	Masahito Kobayashi	Naoko Ogigami	April 19, 2019
In April, Kaoru, Rilakkuma, Korilakkuma, and Kiiroitori clean up and move out of their apartment, reflecting on the past year they spent together.

=== Season 2 (2022) ===
No. overall	No. in season	Title	Directed by	Written by	Original release date
14	1	"An Uneasy Feeling"; Transliteration: "Toraburu na Yokan" (Japanese: トラブルな予感)	Masahito Kobayashi	Naoko Ogigami	August 25, 2022
15	2	"Game Battle with Emiri"; Transliteration: "Emiri to Gēmu Batoru" (Japanese: エミリとゲームバトル)	Masahito Kobayashi	Naoko Ogigami	August 25, 2022
16	3	"Eiji and the jungle tour" Transliteration: "Eiji to Janguru Tsuā" (Japanese: 永治とジャングルツアー)	Masahito Kobayashi	Naoko Ogigami	August 25, 2022
17	4	"Clown in Love"; Transliteration: "Piero no Koisuru Jaguringu" (Japanese: ピエロの恋するジャグリング)	Masahito Kobayashi	Naoko Ogigami	August 25, 2022
18	5	"Suzune's an Idol"; Transliteration: "Suzune wa Aidoru!" (Japanese: スズネはアイドル！)	Masahito Kobayashi	Naoko Ogigami	August 25, 2022
19	6	"The Secret of the Theme Park"; Transliteration: "Yūenchi no Himitsu" (Japanese: 遊園地の秘密)	Masahito Kobayashi	Naoko Ogigami	August 25, 2022
20	7	"Strategy Meeting in the Dark"; Transliteration: "Kurayami no Sakusen Kaigi" (Japanese: くらやみの作戦会議)	Masahito Kobayashi	Naoko Ogigami	August 25, 2022
21	8	"The Last Parade"; Transliteration: "Saigo no Parēdo" (Japanese: 最後のパレード)	Masahito Kobayashi	Naoko Ogigami	August 25, 2022

== Reception ==
Petrana Radulovic from Polygon called the show endearing and complimented the juxtaposition of the "whimsy" with Kaoru's struggles with her adult life. James Whitbrook from io9 described the show as "a love letter to the need to escape", noting its message that sometimes even small acts of escape from everyday life are necessary. Anime News Network praised the animation and concept, but mentioned that there was little exploration and resolution towards Kaoru's troubles.
