= Mamegoma =

San-X character

Mamegoma plush toys from a UFO catcher

Mamegoma (まめゴマ) is a series of seal characters released in 2005 by the Japanese company San-X. They were created by Mayumi Yonemura (ja:ヨネムラマユミ) and are depicted as small enough to live in a goldfish bowl. A 2009 Mamegoma anime series called Kupū~!! Mamegoma! (クプ～！！まめゴマ！) was produced by TMS Entertainment. Four Mamegoma Nintendo DS games were released in Japan between 2007 and 2010, and two 3DS games in 2012 and 2013. The first and second DS games shipped a combined total of over 250 000 copies. Several picture books and manga by Yonemura featuring Mamegoma have been published in Japan. The first four books shipped 300 000 copies in total.

== Characters and background ==
The prefix mame, meaning bean in Japanese, is used to refer to miniature versions of things; the suffix goma is an abbreviation of gomafuazarashi, or sesame seed-mottled seal, which is the Japanese name for the spotted seal.

Mamegoma characters are pictured in a variety of different colors including, white, blue, pink, yellow, and black. The seals are depicted as being small enough (12 cm, weighing around 200 g) to live in a common goldfish bowl, usually with a few ice cubes to keep the water nice and cool. They are also shown in bath tubs and relaxing on a wheel in a hamster cage among other activities. They love eating edamame beans.

The original creator of Mamegoma is Mayumi Yonemura (ja:ヨネムラマユミ). The character was created in an in-house competition calling for seal characters. The original draft was named Azarashiriumu (アザラシリウム, transl. Sealquarium). The draft concept included being able to keep a small seal at home, and a visual of a seal in a goldfish gold. The draft was well received by San-X and was developed into the final Mamegoma concept.

The mamegoma characters are available as plush toys from UFO catcher machines. There are also many different products with the Mamegoma seals as a decoration, like stationery, calendars etc.

== Media ==
The 2009 anime Kupū~!! Mamegoma! (クプ～！！まめゴマ！) is based on Mamegoma. It was produced by TMS Entertainment. The story revolves around a Mamegoma character called Mameta, who lives with the elementary school girl Akane after encountering her on the beach. It shows their daily life together with other Mamegoma characters including Soda-kun, Cherry-chan, and Lemon-chan.

Four Mamegoma Nintendo DS games were released in Japan between 2007 and 2010: Mamegoma: Honobono Nikki (ja:まめゴマほのぼの日記, transl. Mamegoma: Heartwarming Diary), Mamegoma 2: Uchi no Ko ga Ichiban! (まめゴマ2 うちのコがイチバン！, transl. Mamegoma 2: My Pet is the Best!), Kupū~!! Mamegoma! (クプ～！！まめゴマ), Mamegoma 3: Kawaii ga Ippai! (まめゴマ3 かわいいがいっぱい！, transl. Mamegoma 3: Full of Cuteness!). The first and second DS games shipped a combined total of over 250 000 copies.

Two Nintendo 3DS games featuring Mamegoma were released in Japan in 2012 and 2013: Mamegoma: Yoiko Maruko Genkinako! (まめゴマ よいこ まるいこ げんきなこ！, transl. Mamegoma: Good Pet, Round Pet, Lively Pet!) and Mamegoma: Happī! Suītsufāmu (まめゴマ はっぴー！スイーツファーム, transl. Mamegoma: Happy Sweets Farm).

A Tamagotchi-like Mamegoma virtual pet called Mamegoma Shiiku Nikki (まめゴマ飼育日記, transl. Mamegoma Raising Diary) was released by Bandai in 2006.

Several books featuring Mamegoma have been published in Japan, including 10 volumes published 2005-2015 in the series Watashi to Mamegoma Nikki (ワタシとまめゴマ日記, transl. Me and Mamegoma Diary) by the original creator, Mayumi Yonemura. The series includes both picture book story telling and yonkoma manga. As of January 2009, the total number of copies published for volumes 1-4 of the series was 300 000. There are also other picture books by Yonemura that are not part of the series. Another series of picture books based on the Kupū~!! Mamegoma! anime was also published in Japan.
