= Monokuro Boo =

San-X characters

Monokuro Boo (モノクロブー) are anime-style characters that were created in 2005 by the Japanese company San-X. The characters are composed of two pigs, one white and one black, with square-shaped bodies, dots for eyes, a snout and a curly tail at the back. They are also occasionally seen with a bee flying around them. The black pig name is Monokuro, while the white pig name is Boo.

Monokuro Boo's tagline is "Simple is Best", and one or both of the pigs can also be seen with speech bubbles that say, "Boo", "Love?", "Enjoy?", or "Happy".

Two Monokuro Boo picture books by Atsuko Hoshino (ホシノアツコ) were published in Japan in 2006 and 2007.

A Nintendo DS game was released in 2009.

== Character Concept and Name ==
The original character name was "Monotone," with "mono" coming from "monochrome" and "ton," a word for pig. The designer deliberately bucked the then-current trend for colorful goods for a monotone palette, hoping to create a fun style.

In line with the character's concept, the name "Monokuro Boo" is also a derivation of the words "Monokuro" ("Monochrome") and "Boo" (the Japanese onomatopoeic equivalent for "oink").

== Baby Boo ==
San-X has also created a spin-off line of products which features smaller, pastel or candy-colored pigs known as Baby Boo (ベビーブー). Baby Boo consists of seven pigs who are named and colored as follows:

- Berry – pastel red
- Peach – pastel pink
- Orange – pastel orange
- Lemon – pastel yellow
- Mint – pastel green
- Soda – pastel blue
- Grape – pastel purple/lavender

Baby Boo's tagline is "Are you happy?" ("anata wa shiawase?") and "So Happy With You*" ("anata to iru to tottemo tanoshī*"). As with Monokuro Boo, a bee-like insect is also seen hovering near the Baby Boo, except the bee is made to look like a strawberry (or ladybug). Some of the Baby Boos also say, "Poo".
