= Kimuraya =

Bakery in Japan

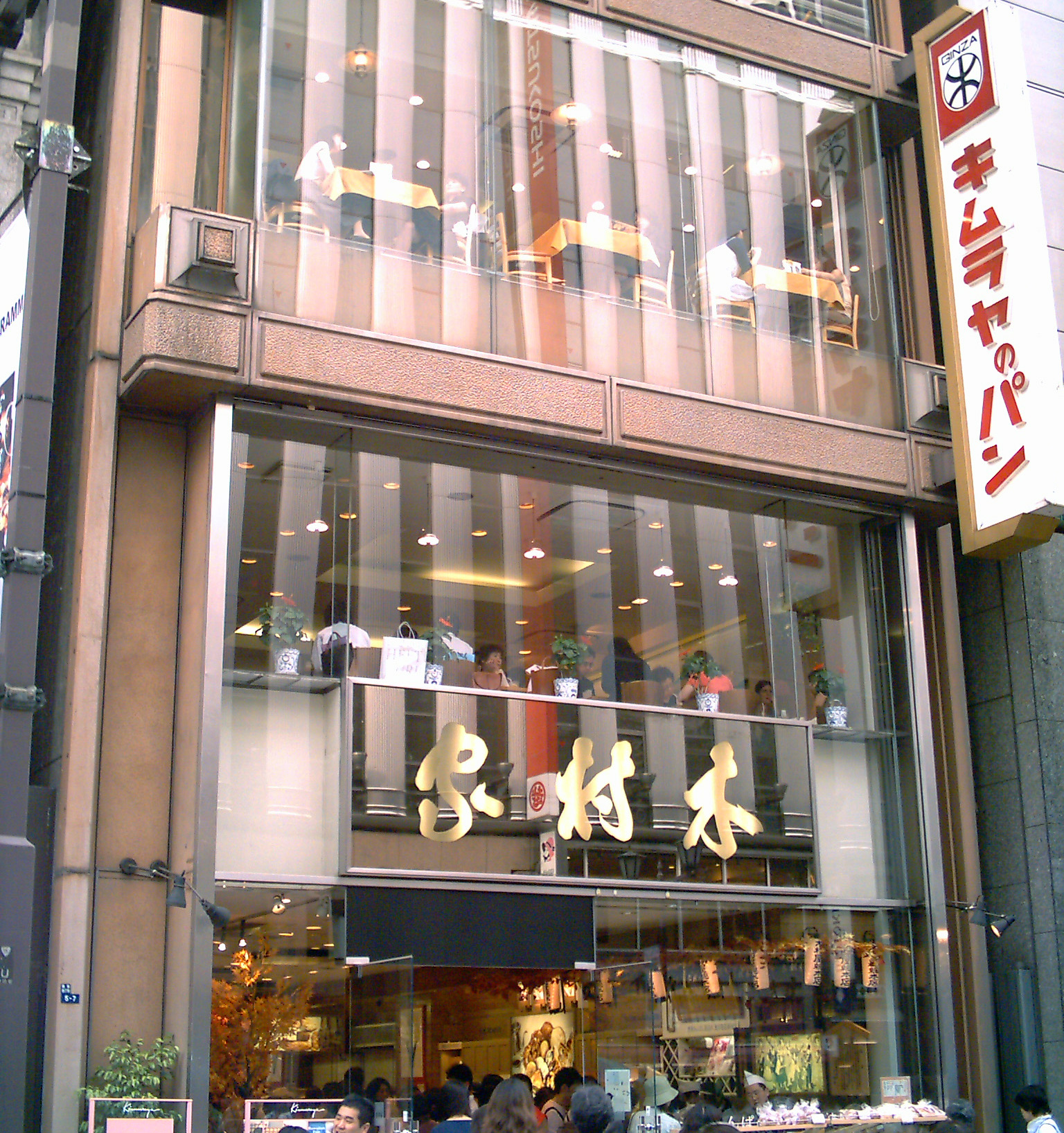

Kimuraya Sohonten (Japanese: 木村屋總本店) is a bakery which was first established in 1869 as Bun'eidō (文英堂) by a former samurai, Yasubei Kimura. It was then renamed Kimuraya in 1870.

== Products ==
The bakery makes about 130 unique products, some of which are only available on a seasonal basis.

Kimura invented the anpan sweet bun in 1874, which became popular with the emperor and sold very well.

On February 1, 2024, Kimuraya's newest product went on sale on their online store and in Japan's Kanto area supermarkets. Kimuraya reportedly worked with a Japanese electronics company, NEC, to make an AI Love Bread. NEC utilized two AI technologies for the project: “NEC Enhanced Speech” for converting speech into text, and “NEC Data Enrichment” for generating emotion scores from text data. They then transformed these feelings into various flavors of fluffy steamed bread.
