= Aki Kondo =

Japanese illustrator and character designer

- Born: Akiya Kondawana; February 22, 1977 (age 49); Matsuyama, Ehime, Japan
- Education: Joshibi University of Art and Design (AFA)
- Occupations: Illustrator, designer

Aki Kondo (born February 22, 1977) is a Japanese illustrator and character designer, and former staff of San-X.

== Biography ==
After graduating from the Junior College of Art and Design at Joshibi University of Art and Design, Kondo was hired to work in the Design studio of San-X in 1997.

Kondo created and produced Mikanbouya (December 2002) and Rilakkuma (September 2003) while she was at San-X. In 2002 and 2003 she also wrote and illustrated books with Amagurichan, which was originally created by Miki Takahashi (ja:たかはしみき, Takahashi Miki). Kondo left San-X in 2003, and became a freelance illustrator and designer. In 2005, Kondo has released the first Manga Comic "Okutan & Danna chan".

Kondo is married to illustrator Tarouichi Aizawa and they have two daughters. Kondo is a part-time lecturer in Art and Design for Healing at Joshibi University of Art and Design.

== Works ==
- Rilakkuma
- Amagurichan
- Mikanbouya
- Okutan & Danna chan
- Usagi no Mofy (ja:うさぎのモフィ)
- moguppy
- Chopin & Pansy
- Wonderful Family
- PLATINUM BOYS
- NyaOssan
- Toripeto (トリぺと)
