= Kogepan =

Fictional character and multimedia franchise

Kogepan, described by T: The New York Times Style Magazine as a character who "reads self-help books like How to Become a Delicious Bread to stave off despair"

Kogepan (こげぱん) is a depressed burnt anpan (red bean bread bun) character from the Japanese company San-X, who, like Sanrio creation Hello Kitty, can be found on stationery, accessories, and a number of other products. Kogepan was created by Miki Takahashi (ja:たかはしみき, Takahashi Miki) in the year 2000. A number of Kogepan books by Takahashi have been published in Japan. Adapted to a self-titled short anime series in 2001, animated by Studio Pierrot and produced by Pony Canyon. A Kogepan PlayStation game was released in Japan in 2002. Over two million plush Kogepan toys have been sold, and book sales reached over 1.3 million combined copies.

== Characteristics ==
Kogepan is a burnt anpan (red bean bread bun) who lives in a panya (パンや), a neighborhood bakery. The name comes from kogeru (こげる), meaning to burn or char, and pan (パン), a gairaigo word taken from Portuguese meaning bread.

According to the backstory, a baker who was sleepy dropped Kogepan in the oven, and from the shock of being burned its face went blank and its eyes went white. Kogepan's red bean filling is described as originating in Tokachi Plain, and it would have been an "elite" anpan if it had not been burned. Happiness is always short-lived for Kogepan, and the character has a tendency to drown its sorrows in milk.

There are a number of other bread characters in the panya with Kogepan, including Ichigopan (strawberry bread), Kireipan (beautifully baked red bean bread), Creampan (a burnt cream bread), and Sumipan, a bread even more burnt than Kogepan.

In contrast to earlier animal based characters like Miffy and Hello Kitty, Kogepan is not anthropomorphized to the point of being depicted as human in-universe, but retains bread-like qualities, like wanting to be delicious looking and appealing to buyers. Similar to the chestnut character Amagurichan, which was created by Miki Takahashi for San-X in 2001, much of Kogepan's characterization and plot centers this wish to be delicious, and the sadness of not having it fulfilled.

T: The New York Times Style Magazine described Kogepan as an "antihero" and an example of a character whose "most winning feature comes from a wound".

== Creation ==
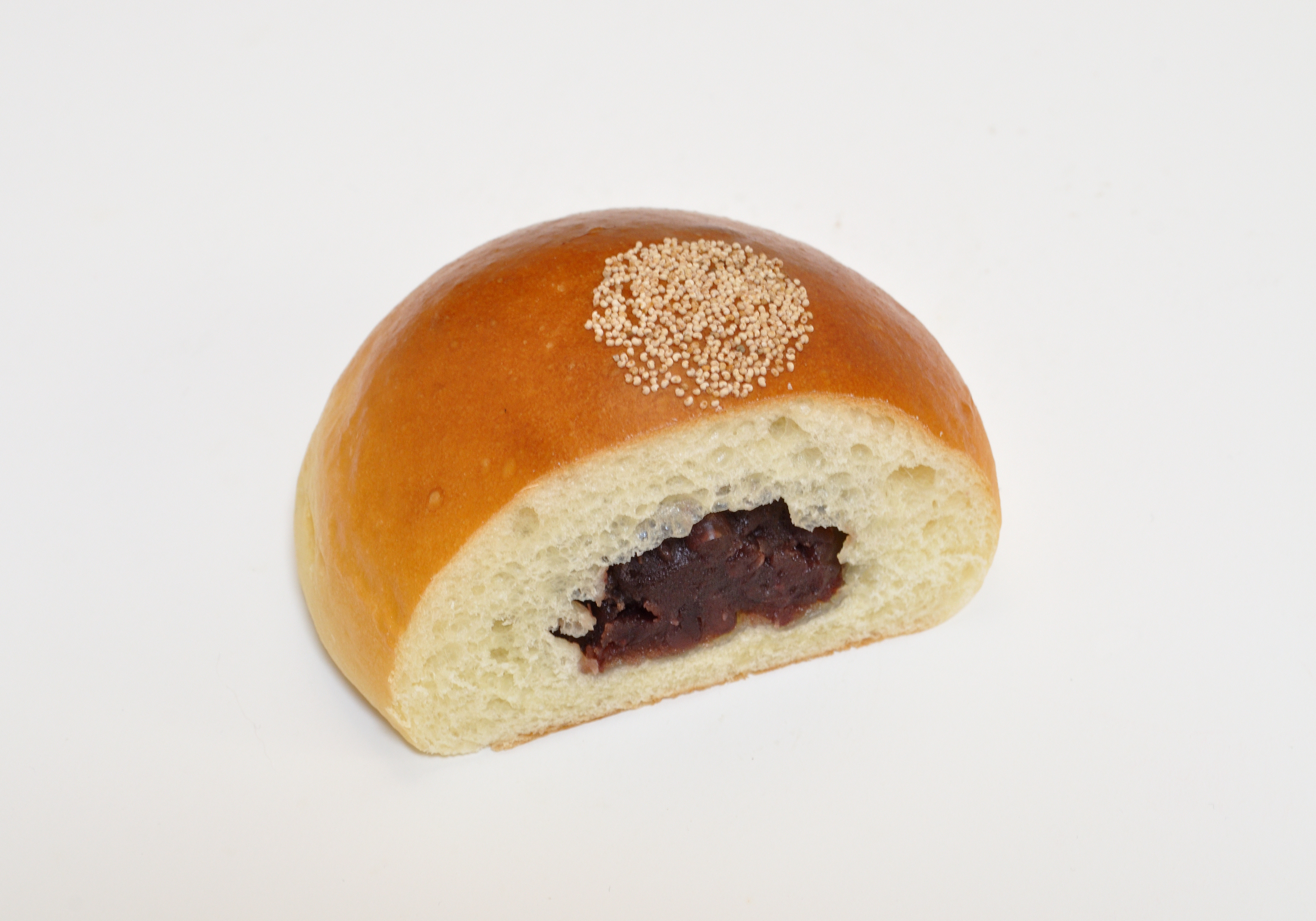
An anpan, the type of red bean bun Kogepan was based on

Kogepan was created by Miki Takahashi (ja:たかはしみき, Takahashi Miki) in 2000, when she was in her first year at San-X. Takahashi started from the concept of a character that seems scary at first, but is hard not to care for. She began the design with a simple draft of an oval face, and because it was an oval shape she pictured it as a bread, and because it had a blank expression she imagined that it failed to sell, because it was burnt. And from there she got Kogepan's resigned catch phrase anyway... (どうせ･･･, dōse...).

Takahashi designed Kogepan with blank white eyes, but after concerns from other San-X staff, she did a number of different eye designs including black dots, ovals, and a side glance, but in the end they decided to go with the original blank eyed style.

Takahashi did not expect the character to be commercialized, and at first she found the size of the project overwhelming. But in collaboration with senior colleagues, she continued to build on the character setting, with the goal of connecting emotionally with people.

== Anime ==
The 2001 Kogepan anime series, broadcast on Animax, animated by Studio Pierrot and produced by Pony Canyon, consists of ten 4-minute shorts, the majority of which introduce simple aspects of the character. It was directed by Hidekazu Ohara (ja:小原秀一, Ohara Hidekazu) with the voice of Kogepan provided by Ako Mayama.

Episodes:

1. Kogepan is introduced.
2. Kogepan meets the similarly burnt bread Creampan and they go on a trip.
3. Kogepan scares the beautiful Kireipan with tales of what will happen when they are bought, but also helps them out.
4. Other burnt breads who live in the bakery with Kogepan are introduced, and they drink coffee milk with the very burned Sumipan.
5. Tells the story of how Kogepan got burnt, and shows dreams of how life would have been if it had not been burnt.
6. Kogepan tries to become a beautiful Kireipan.
7. Kogepan's friend Creampan is introduced, along with its calming influence on Kogepan.
8. Kogepan meets the beautiful pink Ichigopan and they drink milk together.
9. Told from the point of view of a Kireipan who looks up to Kogepan.
10. Shows Kogepan and friends through the four seasons.

== Other media and reception ==
A game for the PlayStation called Kogepan: Pan mo Gēmu o Yarurashī… (こげぱん パンもゲームをやるらしい…, transl. Kogepan: It Seems Bread Also Plays Games...) was released in Japan in 2002 by AIA. The game has a variety of puzzle games and mini games. Mini games include Reversi, racing and volleyball.

A number of Kogepan manga and picture books written and drawn by Miki Takahashi were published in Japan between 2000 and 2008, including the series Yasagure Manga (やさぐれマンガ, transl. Sullen Manga), Kogepan no Pikunikku (こげぱんのピクニック, transl. Kogepan's Picnic), and Burari Tabi Nikki (ぶらり旅日記, transl. Aimless Travel Diary). The series was revived in 2020, when a new manga serialization began in Nene (ja:ね〜ね〜) magazine. A Kogepan book was published in Japan in 2021 with a mix of new and old reworked material.

The first Kogepan product was a memo pad released in 1999. Realsound described the popularity of stationery and other Kogepan products as "explosive." Over two million plush Kogepan toys have been sold, and book sales reached over 1.3 million combined copies.
