= Anpan =

Japanese filled sweet bun

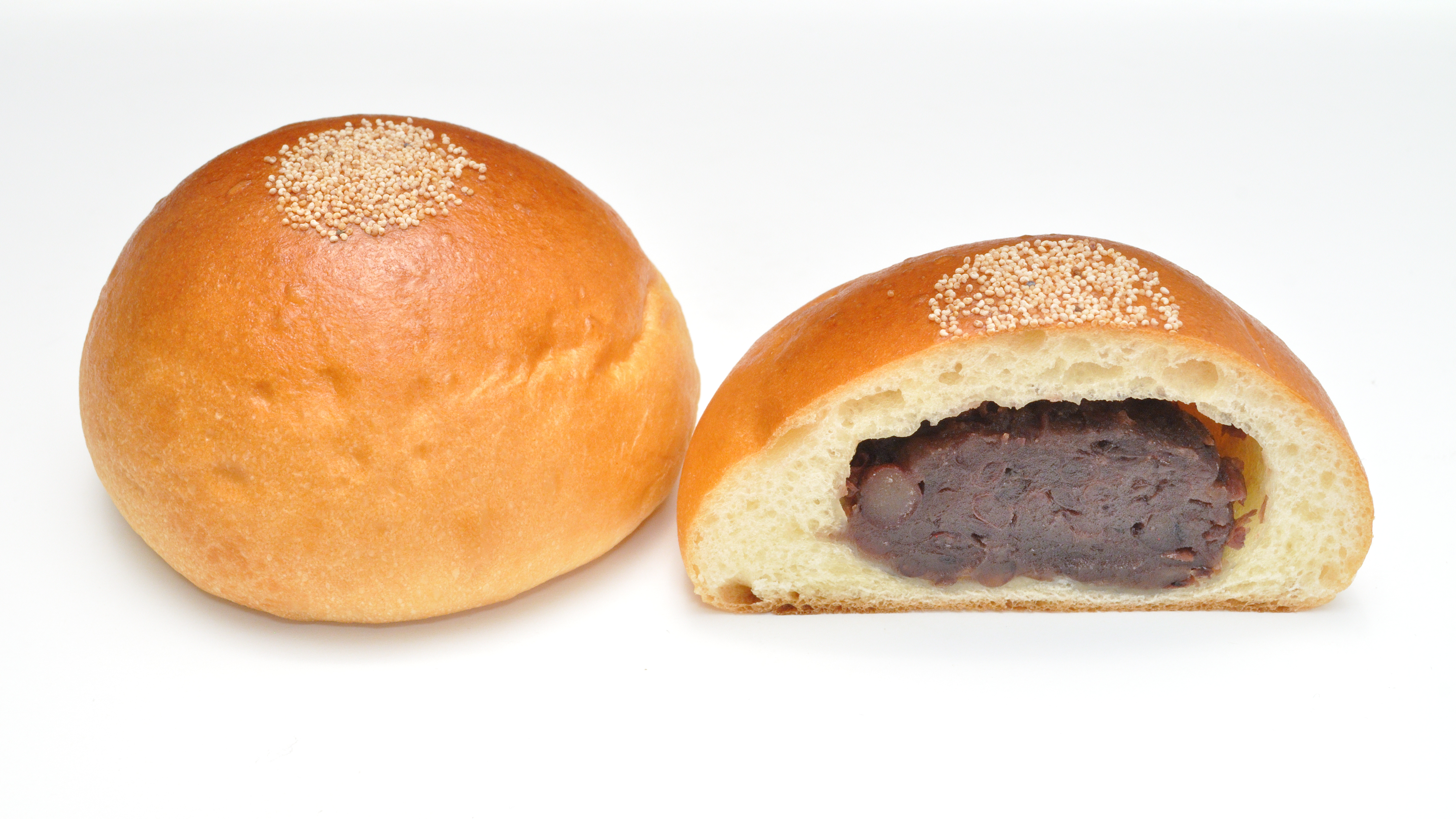
- Type: Sweet roll
- Course: Dessert
- Place of origin: Japan
- Region or state: Ginza, Tokyo
- Created by: Yasubei Kimura
- Main ingredients: Red bean paste

Anpan (あんパン; 餡パン) is a Japanese sweet roll, most commonly filled with red bean paste. It can also be prepared with other fillings, including chocolate, curry, custard, and salt-pickled cherry blossoms. The name is a compound word, combining an (sweet bean paste) and pan (bread). Anpan was made in the 19th century by Yasubei Kimura, a former samurai-turned-baker and the founder of the Kimuraya bakery, which is located in Ginza. After being presented to Emperor Meiji in 1875, the dish became popular in Japan. By 1897, Kimuraya had sold around 100,000 anpan per day. It remains a popular staple of Japanese bakery in the 21st century.

== Description ==
Anpan is a sweet roll filled with red bean paste; a compound word, an refers to the paste, while pan is the Japanese word for bread. Unlike the steamed manjū that anpan is modeled on, anpan is baked or fried. In addition to the original poppy seed and white sesame seed toppings, modern bakeries, including the still extant Kimuraya (木村屋), produce the dessert with a variety of fillings and toppings such as salt-pickled cherry blossoms, chocolate, curry, custard, and pork chops. The roll is usually made of flour, sugar, salt, dry yeast, milk, eggs, and butter.

== History ==
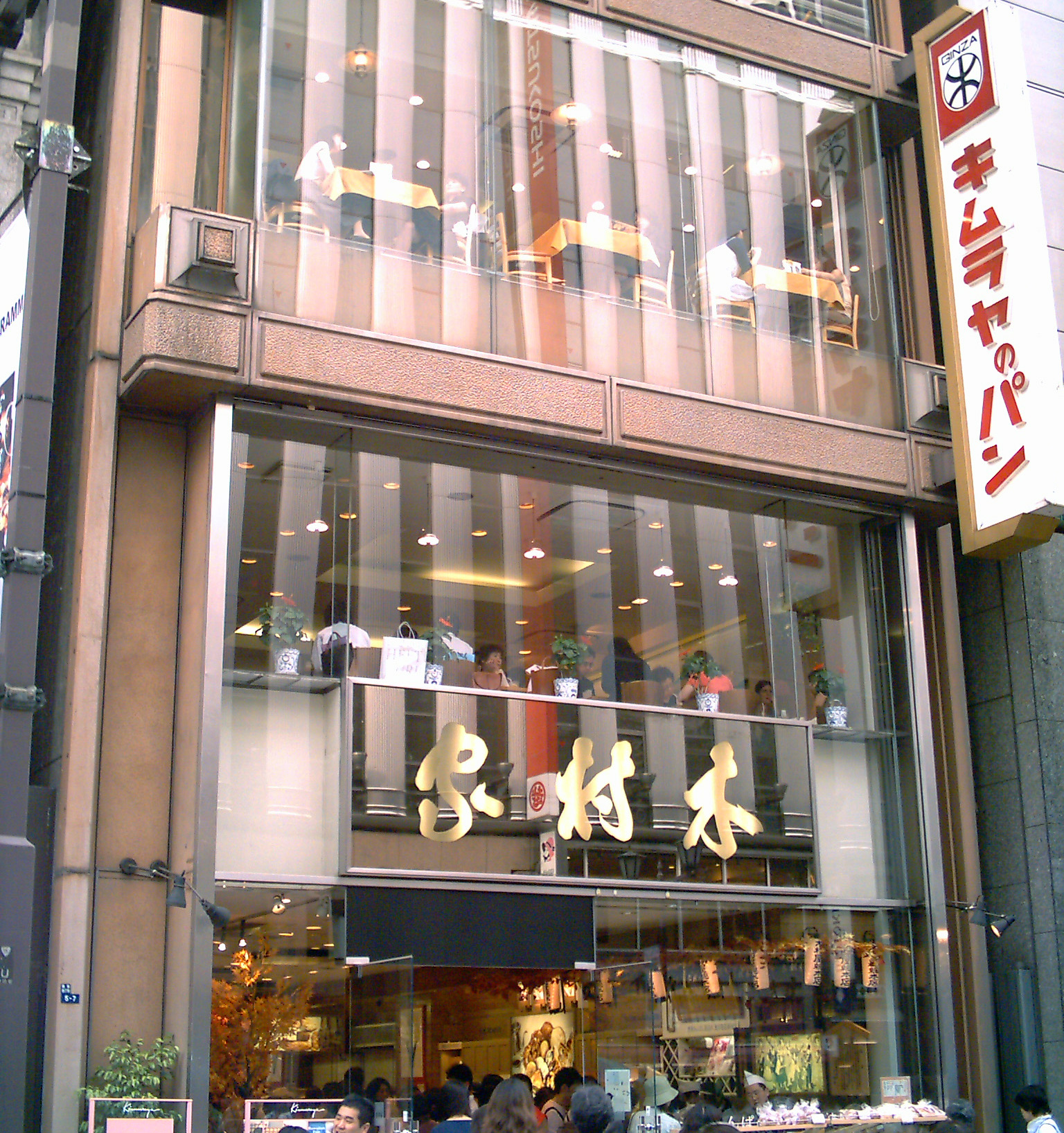
Kimuraya in Ginza

Anpan was first made sometime between 1871 and 1875 in the Meiji era, as Western bakeries gained popularity in Japan for the first time. Its creator, Yasubei Kimura (木村安兵衛 Kimura Yasubei), was a samurai who lost his job and became a baker. The Meiji era marked a period of rapid modernization in Japan, and the usage of bread began to spread. However, the Western-style bread was disliked by the public. Kimura and his son took inspiration from wagashi and created sakadane, a unique Japanese yeast.

Kimura first created a bakery named Bun'eidō (文英堂) in 1869, the first owned in Japan by a Japanese person.
s In 1874, he moved to Ginza and renamed the bakery Kimuraya, now Kimuraya Sohonten. In Kimura's original formulation, two anpan were sold: those with white sesame seeds atop, and others with poppy seeds atop.

Emperor Meiji later acquired a fondness for the dish after Kimura, via chamberlain Yamaoka Tesshū. Concerned with their appearance, he decorated them with a salt-pickled sakura in the middle of each bun. These anpan were presented to the emperor and empress on April 4, 1875, after which the emperor requested the dessert from Kimura on a regular basis. Because of its newfound association with royalty, the popularity of anpan, and bread as a whole, increased throughout Japan. During the bunmei-kaika in late 19th-century, the dish became a symbol of the new Japanese era. During the First Sino-Japanese War, anpan was consumed by soldiers across Japan. By 1897, Kimuraya had sold around 100,000 anpan per day.

By the early 20th century, anpan were popularly perceived to be prepared the day before, bringing concerns that it could grow stale and harm children consuming the rolls. A description in the period of schoolchildren described around a quarter forgoing their lunchboxes for anpan. By the World War II, the dish became a common food staple in Japan. In the 21st century, anpan are widely regarded as a staple of Japanese bakery culture and are often cited as one of the most recognizable examples of Western-influenced "Japanese bread" products. The dessert can be bought in stores, such as Family Mart.

== In popular culture ==
Anpan is celebrated on April 4 in Japan as the Anpan Day.

By the end of World War II, Takashi Yanase, who was in China, had a memory of enjoying eating anpan. After he returned to Japan, he became a graphic designer for Mitsukoshi, while also creating mangas as a hobby. In 1973, he created Anpanman, a picture book and anime series about a superhero whose head is made of anpan. By 2017, five museums based on the franchise existed in cities across Japan. The anime and picture book character Kogepan is an anthropomorphized burned anpan.

"Anpan" is often used as slang for recreational inhalation of paint thinner.
