= Rilakkuma =

- San-X character
- Rilakkuma
- First appearance: 2003
- Created by: Aki Kondo
- Associated characters: Korilakkuma; Kiiroitori; Chairoikoguma

In-universe information
- Nickname: Kuma

Rilakkuma (リラックマ, Rirakkuma) is a fictional character produced by the Japanese company San-X and created by Aki Kondo. San-X portrays Rilakkuma as an anthropomorphized teddy bear close to his bear friends Korilakkuma and Chairoikoguma, along with a bird Kiiroitori. After the character's debut in 2003, Rilakkuma has been featured on stationery and merchandise created by San-X, as well as multiple collaboration cafès. Along with picture books and comics, a stop-motion animation series titled Rilakkuma and Kaoru was broadcast in 2019.

An anime adaptation started airing in April 2026, the series is animated by the studio Production I.G.

== Development ==
San-X employee Aki Kondo had previously created characters such as Amagurichan and Mikanbouya. At the time, San-X ordered staff members to create one character per month. After watching a TV show about dogs at the height of the pet boom in Japan, Kondo not only wanted a pet dog, but also envied dogs' lives, as she was busy with work and hoped to relax more. This inspired her to create Rilakkuma, with his name a portmanteau of the words relax (リラックス, rirakkusu) and bear (クマ, kuma) Rilakkuma was designed with a slightly sloppy posture because Kondo found it amusing, believing that he should look "cute", yet "out of place." Kondo had also designed Rilakkuma with a zipper on his back, which became one of his quirks. San-X initially found Rilakkuma too gangly and had preferred characters with small hands.

== Character ==
Rilakkuma was launched in 2003 and first seen in San-X's four-panel comic series titled Rilakkuma Seikatsu. In Rilakkuma Seikatsu, which describes his origin story, he appears one day in the apartment of a female office worker named Kaoru, who only appears as a silhouette. Rilakkuma spends every day relaxing. The zipper on his back reveals that his appearance is a costume, and his true form is unknown. It is accompanied by other creatures in the series, who also have their own character lines.

=== Korilakkuma ===
Korilakkuma (コリラックマ; lit. "Little relaxing bear") is a white bear introduced in Rilakkuma Seikatsu in 2003. Like Rilakkuma, it appeared in Kaoru's apartment one day and was named by Kiiroitori. It has a red button on its chest and does not appear to be a real bear. It has a mischievous personality and loves pranks.

=== Kiiroitori ===
Kiiroitori (キイロイトリ; lit. "Yellow bird") is Kaoru's pet yellow bird introduced in Rilakkuma Seikatsu in 2003. He can leave his cage at any time and takes care of both Rilakkuma and Korilakkuma.

=== Chairoikoguma ===
Chairoikoguma (チャイロイコグマ; lit. "Brown little bear") is a brown honey bear introduced in 2016. Korilakkuma finds it one day in the forest and befriends it, bringing it to meet Rilakkuma and Kiiroitori. Chairoikoguma has defined fangs when its mouth is opened, as well as bear-shaped honey patches on its feet and rear. Its friend is Kumanbachi (くまんばち; lit. "Bear bee (Carpenter bee)"), a honey bee.

== Marketing and distribution ==
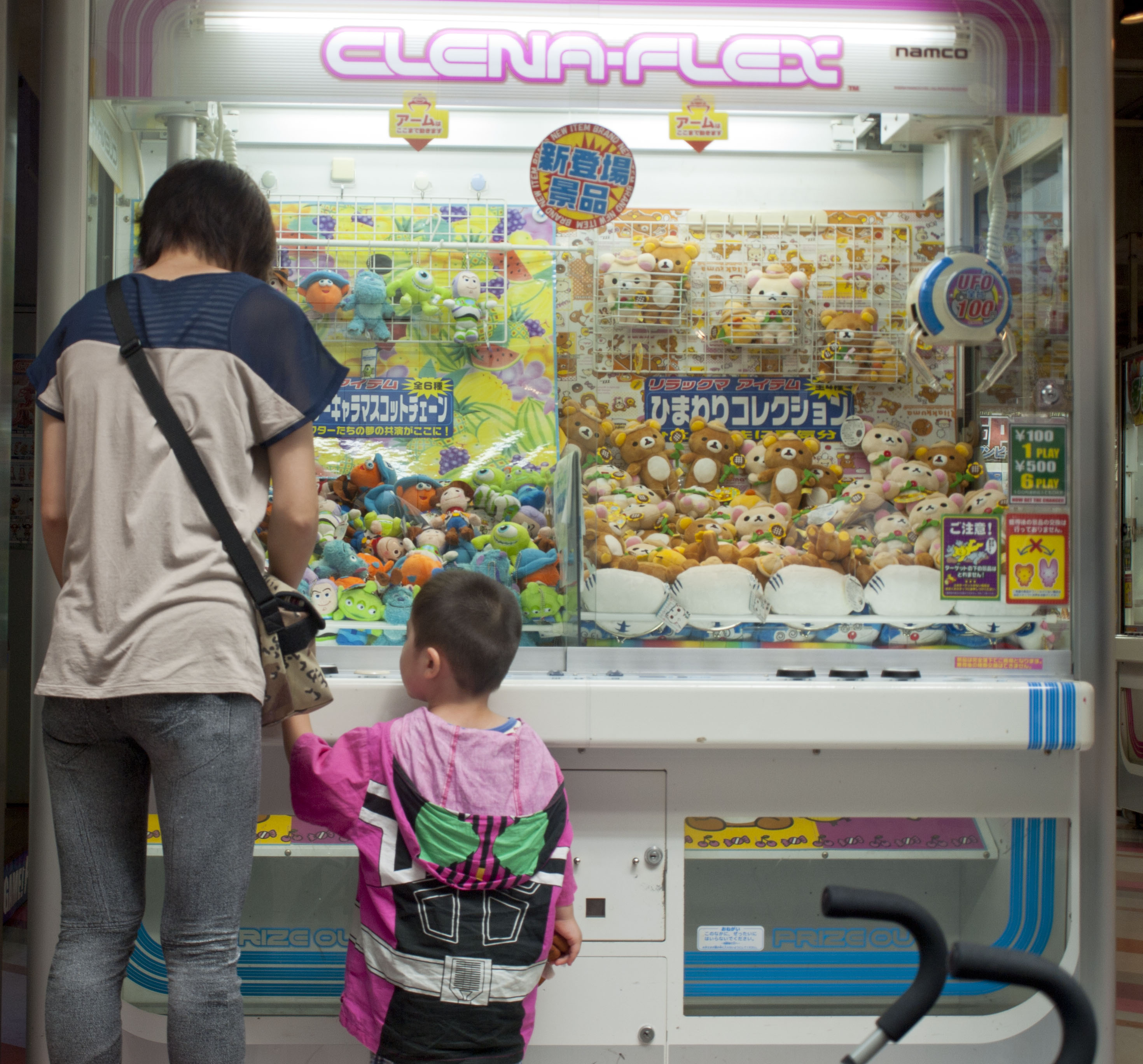
A claw machine with plush Rilakkuma toys

Along with stationery and product lines, Rilakkuma has collaborated with multiple organizations, brands, and character cafes.

In September 2017 San-X opened its first temporary pop-up Rilakkuma shop in Florida, US. In September 2018, a second pop-up shop opened at the New York City's Times Square.

A stop motion animated series called Rilakkuma and Kaoru began streaming on Netflix on April 19, 2019. The series was made at Dwarf Studio. It is directed by Masahito Kobayashi and written by Naoko Ogigami, with Mikako Tabe voicing Kaoru in Japanese and Lana Condor voicing Kaoru in English. In October 2020, it was announced another stop-motion series Rilakkuma's Theme Park Adventure would be released on Netflix. Rilakkuma's Theme Park Adventure was released worldwide exclusively on Netflix on August 25, 2022. It is one of the highest-grossing media franchises of all time.

== Reception ==
Initial sales for the Rilakkuma product line were low but slowly picked up popularity in 2004, with Rilakkuma breaking the stereotype of cute characters needing to be energetic. In May 2010, Rilakkuma ranked as the fifth most popular character in Japan in a survey of the Character Databank. By the end of 2016, Rilakkuma had earned more than 250 billion yen. As of March 2020, character merchandise has generated a total of $10 billion in retail sales revenue across Asia.

== Media ==
=== Picture books ===
- Rilakkuma Seikatsu - Daradara Mainichi no Susume (Aki Kondo, March 2004)
- Dararan Biyori - Rilakkuma Seikatsu 2 (Aki Kondo, November 2004)
- Tori Dayori - Rilakkuma Seikatsu 3 (Aki Kondo, May 2005)
- Kuma Goyomi - Rilakkuma Seikatsu 4 (Aki Kondo, September 2006)
- Utatane Kibun - Rilakkuma Seikatsu 5 (Aki Kondo, September 2007)
- Bonyari Kinenbi - Rilakkuma Seikatsu 6 (Aki Kondo, August 2008)
- Yanwari Jozu - Rilakkuma Seikatsu 7 (Aki Kondou, October 2010)

=== Sticker books ===
- Rilakkuma Daradara Seal Book (Aki Kondo, November 2004)
- Rilakkuma Dara Pika Seal Book (Aki Kondo, May 2005)
- Rilakkuma Gorogoro Seal Book (Aki Kondo, September 2006)
- Rilakkuma Howa Pika Seal Book (Aki Kondo, September 2007)
- Rilakkuma Nohohon Seal Book (Aki Kondo, August 2008)
- Rilakkuma Daradara Seal Book (Aki Kondo, August 2017)

=== Games ===
- Rilakkuma na Mainichi (Rocket Company, Game Boy Advance, April 2005)
- Rilakkuma ~ojamashitemasu 2 Shuukan~ (Interchannel, PlayStation 2, September 2005)
- Watashi no Rilakkuma (Rocket Company, Nintendo DS, April 2007)
- Chokkan Asonde Rilakkuma (Smilesoft, Nintendo DS, September 2008)
- Rilakkuma Minna de Goyururi Seikatsu (MTO, Nintendo Wii, March 2009)
- Norinori Rilakkuma Hit Song Ongaku (Smilesoft, Nintendo DS, December 2010)
- LINE Rilakkuma Loop (LINE), (Android, iOS 2016)
- Rilakkuma Farm (Imagineer, Android, iOS 2019)
- Rilakkuma at Home (Nintendo Switch 2020)

=== TV series ===
- Rilakkuma and Kaoru (Netflix, April 19, 2019)
- Rilakkuma (TBS, April 4, 2026)
