= Zakka =

Fashion trend originating from Japan

Zakka (Japanese: 雑貨 "miscellaneous goods") is a fashion and design phenomenon that has spread from Japan throughout Asia. The term refers to everything and anything that improves one's home, life and appearance. It is often based on household items from the West that are regarded as kitsch in their countries of origin, but it can also be Japanese goods, mainly from the fifties, sixties, and seventies. In Japan there are also so-called Asian Kakka in de zakka stores; that usually refers to Southeast Asia. The interest in Nordic design or Scandinavian design, both contemporary and past, is also part of this zakka movement. Zakka can also be contemporary handicraft.

Zakka has also been described as "the art of seeing the savvy in the ordinary and mundane". The zakka boom could be recognized as merely another in a series of consumer fads, but it also touches issues of self-expression and spirituality. "Cute, corny and kitschy is not enough. To qualify as a zakka, a product must be attractive, sensitive, and laden with subtext."

The Danish independent film Zakka West (2003) by Mikael Colville-Andersen is one of the first examples of the zakka fad reaching the West.
