= Yabusaki =

Yabusaki (written: 薮崎 or 八武崎) is a Japanese surname. Notable people with the surname include:

- Aoi Yabusaki (八武崎 碧, born 1992), better known as Aoi Yūki, Japanese voice actress, actress and singer
- Shinya Yabusaki (薮崎 真哉, born 1978), Japanese footballer
