= Dinosaur Biyori =

Japanese anime television series

ダイナ荘びより (Daina sō biyori)
- Genre: Slice of life
- Anime television series
- Directed by: Akifumi Nonaka
- Music by: CHI-MEY
- Studio: Fanworks
- Original network: Tokyo MX, BS11
- Original run: April 3, 2021 – September 26, 2021
- Episodes: 26

Dinosaur Biyori (Japanese: ダイナ荘びより, Hepburn: Daina sō biyori) is a Japanese original anime television series from Aniplex, Fanworks and Sony Creative Products. This series started airing in Japan from April 3, 2021, on Tokyo MX and BS11.

== Plot ==
Tyrannosaurus, Triceratops, and Stenonychosaurus live together in a one-room apartment. The dinosaurs experience and try to process life in every day scenarios such as working a part-time job or eating sweets. Their clashing personalities cause them to fight occasionally, but theirs is a happy life. However, as Tyrannosaurus is constantly pointing out, their happy life could end in an instant if a meteorite fell.

== Characters ==
Tyrannosaurus (ティラノサウルス, Tiranosaurusu)
Voiced by: Yutaka Matsushige
Tyrannosaurus is the strongest carnivorous dinosaur who likes to eat meat and sweets. Because of his stubby arms, he doesn't like things which he can't do.
Triceratops (トリケラトプス, Torikeratopusu)
Voiced by: Yōji Tanaka
Triceratops is a herbivorous dinosaur who has three horns on his head. He can fall asleep anywhere and anytime. He's so bad at reading atmospheres.
Stenonychosaurus (ステノニコサウルス, Sutenonikosaurusu)
Voiced by: Eiji Kotōge
Stenonychosaurus has a very large brain. He likes those who give him praise, but hates exercise.

== Media ==
=== Anime ===
This series is being produced by Fanworks. Directed by Akifumi Nonaka, script is written by Toru Hosokawa, character design by Usagimen and CHI-MEY composing the music. This anime's image song is "Aisou Ze!" by CHAI.
