= ABCiee Working Diary =

Japanese anime television series

エビシー修業日記 (Abciee Shūgyō Nikki)
- Genre: Comedy
- Created by: ABC Group Holdings
- Anime television series
- Directed by: Ryōsuke Aoike
- Music by: Shigezō Kamimura
- Studio: Fanworks
- Licensed by: Crunchyroll: SA/SEA: Medialink
- Original network: ABC TV
- Original run: January 6, 2021 – March 24, 2021
- Episodes: 12

ABCiee Working Diary (Japanese: エビシー修業日記, Hepburn: Abciee Shūgyō Nikki) is a Japanese anime television series produced by ABC Animation and animated by Fanworks. The series aired from January 6 to March 24, 2021.

== Plot ==
This is a story about an unidentified animal called ABCiee. He always wanted to work in a TV station. When he finally started working in a TV station, he faces a lot of problems and challenges in his way. Despite having these problems, he takes them head on with his positivity.

== Cast ==
Abciee
Voiced by: Aoi Yūki
Kawauso-chan
Voiced by: Ayumi Hirodo
Koi-san
Voiced by: Tomotsu Nishiwaki
Yago Otoko
Voiced by: Mitsuo Iwata
Zarigani-senpai
Voiced by: Masaya Takatsuka
