= Ore, Tsushima =

Japanese manga series

- Cover of Ore, Tsushima volume 1 by Shogakukan

俺、つしま
- Manga
- Written by: Opūnokyōdai
- Published by: Shogakukan
- Original run: July 2017 – present
- Volumes: 4
- Anime television series
- Directed by: Jun Aoki
- Studio: Fanworks; Space Neko Company
- Licensed by: SA / SEA: Muse Communication
- Original network: MBS, TBS, BS-TBS
- Original run: July 3, 2021 – September 18, 2021
- Episodes: 12
- Original net animation
- Directed by: Yoshitomo
- Music by: Satoshi Houno
- Studio: AQUA ARIS
- Licensed by: SA / SEA: Muse Communication
- Released: July 5, 2021 – March 2, 2022
- Runtime: 1-2 minutes
- Episodes: 93

Ore, Tsushima (俺、つしま; "I'm Tsushima the Cat") is a Japanese manga series by Opūnokyōdai. It has been serialized online via the manga's Twitter account since July 2017 and has been collected in four tankōbon volumes by Shogakukan. An anime television series adaptation by Fanworks and Space Neko Company aired from July 3 to September 18, 2021, on the Super Animeism block. An original net animation (ONA) anime series produced by AQUA ARIS was also released from July 5, 2021.

== Characters ==
Tsushima (つしま)
Voiced by: Akio Otsuka
Ojii-chan (おじいちゃん)
Voiced by: Mayumi Tanaka
Miss Zun (ズン姐さん, Zun Nēsan)
Voiced by: Mami Koyama
Cha (ちゃー)
Voiced by: Nobuhiko Okamoto
Osamu (オサム)
Voiced by: Takashi Matsuyama

== Media ==
=== Manga ===
| No. | Release date | ISBN |
|---|---|---|
| 1 | April 24, 2018 | 978-4-09-388617-8 |
| 2 | May 27, 2019 | 978-4-09-388668-0 |
| 3 | October 22, 2020 | 978-4-09-388791-5 |
| 4 | April 24, 2024 | 978-4-09-389156-1 |

=== Anime ===
An anime television series adaptation was announced by Shogakukan on February 22, 2021. The series is co-animated by Fanworks and Space Neko Company, with Jun Aoki directing the series. It aired from July 3 to September 18, 2021, on the Super Animeism block on MBS, TBS, and BS-TBS, and subsequently released on the Asmik Ace YouTube channel worldwide. Muse Communication has licensed the series in Southeast Asia and South Asia.

An original net animation was released from July 5, 2021, to March 2, 2022, on the Asmik Ace YouTube channel worldwide. This series is animated by AQUA ARIS, with Yoshitomo is directing the series. (Note: Information is taken from the ending credits of each episode.) Muse Communication has also licensed the ONA series in Southeast Asia and South Asia for streaming on their YouTube channel.
