= Aggretsuko =

Japanese animated streaming television series

アグレッシブ烈子 (Aguresshibu Retsuko)
- Genre: Comedy
- Created by: Sanrio
- Anime television series
- Directed by: Rarecho
- Written by: Rarecho
- Studio: Fanworks
- Original network: TBS
- Original run: April 2, 2016 – March 31, 2018
- Episodes: 100
- Original net animation
- Directed by: Rarecho
- Produced by: Kelly Luegenbiehl; Kaata Sakamoto; Taro Goto; Yoichiro Shimomura; Miyuki Okumura; Akira Takayama; Yasue Mochizuki
- Written by: Rarecho
- Studio: Fanworks
- Licensed by: Netflix
- Released: April 20, 2018 – February 16, 2023
- Runtime: 15–33 minutes
- Episodes: 50 + special
- icon

Aggretsuko, also known by its Japanese title Aggressive Retsuko (Japanese: アグレッシブ烈子, Hepburn: Aguresshibu Retsuko), is a Japanese anime comedy television series based on the eponymous character designed by "Yeti" for the mascot company Sanrio. The character first appeared in a series of animated shorts by Fanworks which aired on TBS Television between April 2016 and March 2018.

An original net animation (ONA) anime series adaptation was launched worldwide on Netflix in April 2018, followed by a second season in June 2019, a third season in August 2020 and a fourth season in December 2021. A fifth and final season debuted in February 2023.

A comic book series adaptation by Daniel Barnes and D.J. Kirkland was launched by Oni Press. The first issue was released on February 5, 2020.

A mobile game, Aggretsuko: The Short Timer Strikes Back, was released by Hive for Android and iOS in July 2020. The game, which is available worldwide, includes the full 100 short episode series, which need to be unlocked individually via normal gameplay. Whilst subtitled, the short episodes were not dubbed into other languages. The main character Retsuko was included in Hello Kitty Island Adventure on Apple Arcade in June 2023 as a major character.

== Plot ==
Retsuko is a 25-year-old and single anthropomorphic red panda, working in the accounting department of a Japanese trading firm called Carrier Man Trading Co., Ltd, trying her best to navigate through the typical problems encountered by young adults in 21st century Japan. Facing constant frustration every day from pushy superiors and co-workers, Retsuko lets out her emotions by going to a karaoke bar every night and singing death metal. After five years of working the daily grind, Retsuko's misery causes her to undergo a series of events that puts her job in jeopardy, forcing her to shift her relationships with her co-workers and ends up changing her life in unexpected ways. After this, she continues to come up with ways to find happiness, and eventually comes to the conclusion that she would one day like to get married and raise a family. Unfortunately, her social anxiety combined with her timidity often causes her to get involved in more situations than she expects while pursuing her dreams.

In Season 4, the show focused less on Retsuko as the protagonist and more on her colleagues at the office, each with their own unique set of problems.

In Season 5, the show mainly focuses on Retsuko being involved with the Japanese government with her running for a seat on the National Diet, along with Haida's life after quitting his office job and being evicted from his parents' apartment, with him meeting Shikabane, a 21-year-old gamer who has given up on life and is a net cafe refugee.

== Characters ==
Retsuko (烈子)
Voiced by: Kaolip, Rarecho (metal vocals) (Japanese); Erica Mendez, Jamison Boaz (metal vocals) (English)
A 25-year-old red panda in her company's accounting department who lets out frustrations over her job by singing death metal at a karaoke bar. She is an amiable introvert who suffers from social anxiety, and is prone to unrealistic dreams to the point where it negatively impacts her and those around her. After Retsuko bad-mouths her boss, Ton, on TV, Ton nicknames her "Short-Timer" (Japanese dub) or "Calendar" (English dub), implying her job is on the line. When confronted with a new problem, personal or otherwise, she quickly retreats to a corner and tries to resolve the issue alone, if she does not outright surrender. This shows that her emotional maturity is lacking, and she is reluctant to confide in others. However, she slowly develops a healthier emotional state with help from her friends and, ironically, the co-workers she often cannot stand. By Season 3, she goes fully public with her death metal singing, thus beginning a lucrative side hustle.
Director Ton (トン)
Voiced by: Souta Arai (Japanese); Josh Petersdorf (English)
The domestic pig director of the accounting department, who constantly gives Retsuko a hard time through blatant sexism or overwork. He spends significant time practicing golf instead of working, though it is shown that he is an incredibly skilled and speedy accountant despite being tech illiterate. Though he regularly belittles Retsuko, it is implied that he greatly respects her, and possibly sees her as his successor. He has more than once stepped into her personal life with timely wisdom to save her from situations that are causing her grief. In spite of his toughness, he has a soft spot for his family, and initially hides from them the fact that he was forced to quit his job in Season 4. He is also protective of his workforce, refusing to fire anyone in the accounting department when incentivized to do so by the new president.
Fenneko (フェネ子, Feneko)
Voiced by: Rina Inoue (Japanese); Katelyn Gault (English)
Retsuko's fennec fox co-worker and closest friend in the office. Highly perceptive and insightful, she is able to deduce anyone's mental state through mere observation of their habits and deviations from their usual patterns – namely, through scrutinizing others' social media. Cynical by nature, she often openly criticizes something only to later enjoy it, sometimes to an obsessive degree. She also has a close relationship with Haida and an unusual rivalry with Tsunoda. She has a highly distinctive, monotonous laugh.
Haida (ハイ田)
Voiced by: Shingo Kato (Japanese); Ben Diskin (English)
Retsuko's mild-mannered, 27-year-old spotted hyena co-worker, who is in love with her. His roundabout approach to confessing his feelings puts him in many comical situations; in many ways, he shares the same social anxiety and confidence problems as Retsuko, resulting in poor communication with her. Despite being rejected, he struggles to move on and continues to pine for her, often reacting badly whenever she goes out with someone. However, he does give Retsuko space to keep himself in check, and genuinely cares for Retsuko's well-being and happiness. Haida is an avid punk rock fan, and plays bass guitar. Haida is skilled in programming and IT work, but his work is frequently dismissed by the tech illiterate seniors in Accounting, leaving him frustrated. In Season 4, Haida is suddenly promoted to Accounting Director but later quits the company altogether after being forced to partake in financial fraud.
Director Gori (ゴリ)
Voiced by: Maki Tsuruta (Japanese); G. K. Bowes (English)
A gorilla lady who works as director of marketing at Retsuko's company. Along with Washimi, she does yoga with Retsuko and eventually joins her in karaoke. Despite her serious nature at work, she is highly excitable and takes great interest in bonding with Retsuko. A running gag with Gori is her over-the-top mourning over failed relationships, usually romantic ones. Despite being 40 years old and incredibly career-driven, she has high hopes to still get married someday and continues to make bold attempts to find "the one".
Ms. Washimi (鷲美)
Voiced by: Komegumi Koiwasaki (Japanese); Tara Platt (English)
A secretary bird who works as the secretary to the company's CEO, and arguably the company's de facto CEO due to the actual CEO's incompetence. Strong-willed and confident, she is very wise and gives Retsuko a lot of sage advice when she is not busy keeping Gori's excitability in check. She sometimes axe kicks to intimidate those who frustrate her (mostly her boss), embodying the classic hunting behavior of her animal. Though very level-headed, she loses significant composure when the topic of marriage comes up, having gone through a bitter divorce after a four-month long marriage in her past.
Tsunoda (角田)
Voiced by: Rina Inoue (Japanese); G. K. Bowes (English)
A perky gazelle coworker of Retsuko who frequently sucks up to Ton in order to remain in a favorable position and to lighten her own workload. Her shameless approach to office politics and social media stardom earns her the ire of many. However, she is highly self-aware and more genuine than her personality lets on. She is an expert on discerning the emotional and mental states of those around her. As the show progresses, she gradually develops a closer friendship with Fenneko.
Komiya (小宮)
Voiced by: Sota Arai (Japanese); Todd Haberkorn (English)
Ton's meerkat right-hand subordinate. Like Tsunoda, Komiya sucks up to Ton, but he appears to be motivated by genuine admiration for Ton while Tsunoda only does so for her own calculated benefits. In Season 3, it is revealed that he runs a popular blog on JPop idols and becomes a big fan of Retsuko after seeing her sing on-stage.
Tsubone (坪根)
Voiced by: Maki Tsuruta (Japanese); Debra Cardona (English)
A Komodo dragon who is a senior to Retsuko in the accounting department. She is highly condescending and is implied to enjoy watching others fail, usually by giving them one of her many air-tight snack jars to open. Much like Ton, she frequently uses her seniority to push her extra work onto Retsuko. She is implied to have a significant bond with Ton, having worked in the Accounting department for almost as long as he has. Likewise, she is also tech illiterate, and gets defensive when asked to update the way she does her work.
Kabae (カバ恵)
Voiced by: Yuki Takahashi (Japanese); Misty Lee (English)
Retsuko's hippo chatty coworker. Kabae is a middle-aged woman who frequently runs her mouth as the company's rumor mill. She is easily excited by new gossip but claims to never spread anything malicious. She is happily married to her husband and has three kids at home. Her motherly personality, when applied at work, has polarizing results on the younger workers at the office. In Season 4, she reveals that she has a considerable amount of espionage and stealth skills, showing Retsuko how to sneak around the office building's ventilation shafts.
Resasuke (れさすけ)
Voiced by: Shingo Kato (Japanese); Max Mittelman (English)
Retsuko's one-time, and oblivious, red panda boyfriend in Season 1, who works in the Sales Department at their trade firm. Nicknamed the "Out of Pocket Prince" (Japanese dub) or "Space Cadet" (English dub), he is constantly zoning out, irresponsible with job duties, soft-spoken, and has zero social awareness. He has a large collection of thriving plants at home, suggesting that his character is a play on the Japanese term "herbivore men".
Anai (穴井)
Voiced by: Sota Arai (Japanese); Billy Kametz (Season 2–4), Ricco Fajardo (Season 5) (English)
A Japanese badger recent college graduate and a new hire in Retsuko's accounting department beginning in Season 2. He is very happy and eager on the surface, but does not take any kind of feedback lightly, treating it as a personal attack. This causes him to neurotically harass whoever "criticized" him via email demanding a written apology and recording all future conversations with the threat of escalation. As such, his professional and social skills are very lackluster, though his brick wall approach to criticism also renders him immune to the office politics others freely exercise. He is, however, receptive to Kabae's motherly approach, and gradually learns to get along with everyone through her, suggesting that he regularly suffers from extreme anxiety. He is also an excellent cook and later sells his home-cooked meals to his co-workers. In Season 3, he becomes more emotionally stable, having found a girlfriend and writing a cookbook as a side project.
Tadano (只野)
Voiced by: Chiharu Sasa (Japanese); Griffin Burns (English)
A donkey who is briefly Retsuko's boyfriend in Season 2. Initially shown as a lazy, jobless bum, Tadano is actually the founder of his own AI company that is quickly rising in stock and is both incredibly wealthy and intelligent. Tadano's laziness is attributed to the fact that he quickly loses interest in any task he finds mundane, and is driven to bring his AI program to the masses in hopes of moving society past late-stage capitalism, supporting programs like universal basic income. Retsuko slowly falls for the laid-back but driven Tadano after meeting him in driving class, unaware of his true identity, and starts a genuine, happy relationship with him. However, the relationship ends when Tadano revealed that he is not interested in having kids or getting married. Tadano remains a recurring character in later seasons, befriending the people around Retsuko and continues to support her and her friends (like Haida with his feelings towards Retsuko and Gori with the matchmaking app she developed) without asking for anything in return.
Retsuko's Mother
Voiced by: Maki Tsuruta (Japanese); Kaitlyn Robrock (English)
Retsuko's overbearing red panda mother, who is currently unnamed. Beginning in the second season, she regularly visits Retsuko, unannounced, trying to pressure her into marriage with one of many bachelors found via matchmakers. Despite her questionable actions, such as duplicating Retsuko's apartment key without her permission, she genuinely cares about Retsuko's well-being and gives her more opportunities to grow into adulthood by, often under immense emotional pressure, pushing her away from her comfort zone of "work, home, phone, sleep" as well as cooking and cleaning for her when she is visiting.
Hyodo (豹堂, Hyōdō)
Voiced by: Sota Arai (Japanese); SungWon Cho (English)
A leopard who is the manager for the up-and-coming idol group "OTM Girls" (short for Ōtemachi). Retsuko initially meets him when she accidentally crashes into his van, forcing her to take up a second job as the group's accounting manager to pay off her debt. When Hyodo inadvertently discovers her singing death metal at her regular karaoke spot, he decides to move the OTM Girls in a pop/metal fusion direction and coerces Retsuko into the center of the group. He is secretive about his day job with the girls, which initially leads Retsuko to believe he is involved in some kind of criminal activity. However, towards the end of the season it is revealed that he works as a window washer during the day and that he probably conceals this out of shame. Though highly aggressive and intimidating, his anger is implied to be a front to cover his feelings about his own failings and incompetence, as he is very poor with finances.
Manaka (マナカ)
Voiced by: SAYUMI (Japanese); Deva Marie Gregory (English)
The chinchilla lead singer of the OTM Girls. In stark contrast to Retsuko's extremely passive personality, Manaka is confident and brash. She often behaves like a diva, but she genuinely cares for those around her, including Retsuko. Her bold personality comes from the fact that she neither desires nor cares for approval from others, and encourages Retsuko to be less afraid of upsetting others, accident or otherwise. When she is not performing, she is a store clerk at a local convenience store.
Inui (戌井)
Voiced by: Rina Inoue (Japanese); Abby Trott (English)
A Borzoi who works in the General Affairs department at Retsuko's company. Introduced in Season 3, Inui is a sweet, gentle, and caring woman who tries to pursue a relationship with Haida after a chance encounter. Though they initially get off to a good start due to their shared love for punk rock, with Fenneko and Gori both pressuring Haida to accept her, Haida eventually turns her down. Though obviously hurt, Inui gracefully accepts the rejection.
Himuro (ヒムロ)
Voiced by: Yōhei Azakami (Japanese); Trevor Devall (English)
An Afghan Hound who is the External Director of Retsuko's company. Introduced in Season 4, Himuro is promoted to CEO after the original CEO is hospitalized. He is very strict and possibly sociopathic, prioritizing obedience and determined to modernize the company at any cost. While his initial methods are financially sound, Himuro unabashedly begins to lay people off from the Accounting Department to save costs, and promotes Haida to Accounting Director. Surrounded by hostile board members who see him as an upstart outsider, Himuro eventually resorts to ordering Haida to cook the books. He quits after being exposed by the other members of the Accounting Department for fraud.
Jiro Haida (ハイ田ジロウ, Haida Jirou)
Voiced by: Yohei Azakami (Japanese); Matthew Mercer (English)
Haida's 25-year old spotted hyena younger brother introduced in Season 5, who is Retsuko's rival when she is running in the House of Representatives election in Tokyo Ward 8. Compared to his older brother, Jiro is more self-assured and prideful, owing to being the more gifted child in his family. He is cunning, knowing how to play his brother like a fiddle, and also charismatic enough to win himself over for the masses.
Shikabane (シカバネ)
Voiced by: Mewhan (Japanese); Lisa Reimold (English)
A 21-year-old purple skunk introduced in Season 5 who is disillusioned by the state of the world around her. A quiet character, she lives in an internet café and envelops herself in the online world while doing freelance work to sustain her lifestyle. She and Haida meet each other in an online video game; she plays a male character as previous friends expressed interest in forming relationships after learning she is a girl. Haida tries to encourage her to do more with her life to no avail but eventually Retsuko manages to motivate her through karaoke, and she decides to look for housing.

== Media ==
=== TV anime ===
A series of 100 one-minute anime shorts directed by Rarecho by Fanworks aired on Tokyo Broadcasting System Television between April 2, 2016, and March 31, 2018, as part of the Ō-sama Brunch television program. It also aired on Astro Xiao Tai Yang in Malaysia. Pony Canyon began releasing the shorts on DVD from January 18, 2017.

=== Mobile game ===
In July 2020, a mobile game, Aggretsuko: The Short Timer Strikes Back, was released by Hive for Android and iOS devices. The game is a tile-matching puzzle game with the premise that Aggretsuko should begin working to build the furniture on the new company building, similar to games like Gardenscapes. For every ten levels completed, the user can download and see the episodes of the original one minute length TV Anime shorts.

=== Netflix series ===
A Netflix original series was announced in December 2017, with Rarecho returning as director and writer at Fanworks. The first season, consisting of ten episodes, was released worldwide on April 20, 2018, with a second season which was released on June 14, 2019. A third season premiered on August 27, 2020. A fourth season premiered on December 16, 2021. A fifth and final season was released on February 16, 2023.

A Christmas special was released on December 20, 2018.

==== Series overview ====
Season	Episodes	Originally released
1	10	April 20, 2018
Special	1	December 20, 2018
2	10	June 14, 2019
3	10	August 27, 2020
4	10	December 16, 2021
5	10	February 16, 2023

==== Season 1 (2018) ====
No. overall	No. in season	Title (Note: All English episode titles taken from Netflix.)	Original release date
1	1	"A Day in the Life of Retsuko"	April 20, 2018
After five years at the same company, office worker Retsuko has to deal with many daily annoyances. She inadvertently arrives at work in her sandals, interacts with co-workers who either kiss up to the boss or could not care less about work. Her boss, Ton, makes her do menial tasks like dusting his desk and getting him tea, and then piles a bunch of papers on her, keeping her late at night. Afterwards, she lets out her frustrations by going to a karaoke bar and singing death metal.
2	2	"A Good, Hard-working Girl"	April 20, 2018
While shopping in a clothing store, Retsuko unexpectedly meets up with her free-spirited friend, Puko. During a dinner together in a restaurant, Puko reveals that she is going to start her own business, and asks if Retsuko wants in. Retsuko is hesitant as she cannot leave her job. But, after enduring more frustration at work – Tsubone gives her more paperwork, and she watches Ton and Komiya do nothing but daydream of playing golf – she is set up to quit her job.
3	3	"Short-timer"	April 20, 2018
Retsuko expressed her frustrations with the boss on broadcast television while walking in Shibuya. With the glimmer of hope that she can quit the job and start working in Puko's shop, Retsuko tries to prevent her coworkers to know about this and becomes more inclined to stand up to her superiors. But, after learning that her dream job is not what she is expecting, her plan to quit backfires. To make matter worse, Director Ton and Komiya discovers that Retsuko has been browsing on how to quit the job and knows about her plans, thus Director Ton nicknames her "Short-Timer" (Note: The nickname is changed to "Calendar" in the English dub.) and will subject her to more work and power abuse.
4	4	"Walking Down the Aisle"	April 20, 2018
Retsuko and her friend are visiting a wedding reception, commenting on how the couple is perfect for each other, and Retsuko gives away most of her money as a wedding gift. Soon, when she gets a call from her friend that the couple is getting divorced, she resents giving away the money. But after thinking about marriage, Retsuko considers that if she got married, she would finally be able to quit her job. With the plan set in motion, she starts to take yoga classes, where she meets and befriends her co-workers Gori and Washimi. On the way back home, Retsuko gets a call from her friend that the couple is back together again, thus the money given to them is not a waste.
5	5	"Exposed"	April 20, 2018
Retsuko keeps on with her daily routine, taking yoga classes with Gori and Washimi, along with working in the office and getting abused by her superiors. One night, while walking towards the station, Gori and Washimi end up taking Retsuko to her usual karaoke bar, much to her dismay. The note which is given to Gori by their yoga instructor reveals a song number, which she inputs into the jukebox. As the song plays, Retsuko finally reveals her love for death metal songs, and also reveals her activity of venting her frustrations through karaoke.
6	6	"Stoking Rebellion"	April 20, 2018
At work, Retsuko keeps on getting abused by Director Ton and other superiors, though she notices how Tsunoda easily gets along with the boss. Retsuko decides to hang out with Tsunoda one night at dinner, asking her for tips on how to make up with the boss. The plan backfires when Retsuko makes up to the boss at the wrong time. Hearing about Retsuko's troubles, Washimi uses her connections with the company president to help her out. Thus, that night, the president gives Director Ton a warning. Ton is secretly not happy about it.
7	7	"The Duel"	April 20, 2018
The next morning, Director Ton acts uncharacteristically nice, scaring all the co-workers in the Accounting Department. Ton wants to find out who reported him to the president. That night at an office party, Retsuko hopes she can clear the air with Director Ton, only for Ton to determine that it was Retsuko who had him reported. During a karaoke duel, Ton raps about how useless Retsuko is. Retsuko, almost in despair, finally unleashes her rage form and responds with death metal, knocking everyone out.
8	8	"The Out of Pocket Prince"	April 20, 2018
Retsuko tries to keep her death metal form a secret from Fenneko and Haida. She apologizes profusely to Ton, but he luckily does not remember anything that happened at the office party. Tsunoda invites Retsuko to an office mixer, which she is finally convinced to join. Fenneko also joins after Haida asks her to protect Retsuko. At the office mixer, Retsuko starts to have a hearty conversation with Resasuke through text messaging, a worker from the Sales Marketing Department. After throwing up from intoxication, Resasuke takes care of her. From that moment, she feels she has finally found her dream boy.
9	9	"A Rosy World"	April 20, 2018
Retsuko falls head over heels for Resasuke, becoming oblivious to how bad things really are. Locked into a love-crazed state, she gushes over Resasuke to Gori and Washimi. Retsuko starts to spend more time with Resasuke, giving him a lot of canned coffee with Post-it messages. They go to an amusement park together. Although the intense walking causes her shoes to scrape her heels to the point of bleeding and the freezing winds cause her to catch a cold, Retsuko keeps on being happy with him – and decides not to vent her frustrations in karaoke.
10	10	"The Dream Ends"	April 20, 2018
Retsuko keeps on hanging out with Resasuke while still enduring the pain she is going through. Haida learns that Retsuko is dating Resasuke, and feels bad that he does not have the guts to ask her out. With the end of the quarter getting near, the Accounting Department has to go all out with the end report while dealing with staff shortages (Haida is admitted to a hospital, Tsubone broke her arm while trying to open her jar of cookies, and Kabae is accused of being a spy and detained by authorities). Director Ton talks some sense to Retsuko about her current situation, and she is finally allowed to help the Department finish the report. That night, she takes Resasuke to the karaoke bar to finally vent her frustrations. After her death metal singing, she snaps out of her love-crazed state and sees Resasuke for who he really is. It is later revealed that Resasuke is an "herbivore man". The next day, Retsuko and Fenneko pay Haida a visit, where Haida confesses his feelings to Retsuko. Back at the office, everything goes back to normal, and Retsuko keeps on doing her work and still gets abuse from superiors.

==== Special (2018) ====
No. overall	No. in season	Title	Original release date
–	–	"We Wish You a Metal Christmas"	December 20, 2018
Retsuko becomes so obsessed with getting likes on Instagram that she forgets to make plans for Christmas Eve. Haida experiences a nightmare, reliving the events of Retsuko rejecting him in the hospital. He tries to invite Retsuko to a Christmas party, but bails out due to fearing another rejection. Director Ton makes Retsuko overwork for the night, thus missing out on the Christmas Eve celebration. In desperation, she creates a simple dinner set-up in the office to be posted on Instagram for Christmas Eve. Fearing she might be alone, Haida quickly sets out to look for her. Meanwhile, Gori and Washimi end up hanging out with Retsuko, due to their own plans being foiled. The three of them eat ramen for their Christmas Eve meal. After the meal, Retsuko meets up with Haida and both return home together.

==== Season 2 (2019) ====
No. overall	No. in season	Title	Original release date
11	1	"Time to Grow Up"	June 14, 2019
Retsuko becomes increasingly frustrated with her mother's overbearing ways. It starts with an intense call from her mother, then her mother purchasing a cosplay maid's outfit for her, and finally when her mother secretly comes to visit and Retsuko mistakes her for a burglar. Retsuko's mom asks Retsuko to attend an arranged meeting with a suitor, and Retsuko completely flips out at her mom for setting up the meeting against her will.
12	2	"The New Hire Named Anai"	June 14, 2019
The company hires a new worker named Anai who, at first glance, seems nice and eager. Director Ton appoints Retsuko to train Anai well. Following her mother's request, Retsuko meets with the suitor, who turns out to be a nice enough guy. During work, Retsuko teaches Anai how to do the work, but he is completely nervous and keeps making mistakes. Retsuko comments on his performance, but Anai takes those words as personal attacks on him. He begins writing constant passive-aggressive e-mails to Retsuko, claiming that she is abusive and demanding a written reply to his accusations as soon as possible.
13	3	"Double Moratorium"	June 14, 2019
Retsuko turns down marrying Shirota, making various excuses to mask the fact she is afraid of getting married. Ton berates Retsuko for Anai's lack of progress on the job, but Retsuko tries to hide the fact that every time she tries to lecture Anai, he blackmails her by recording her voice. She keeps on getting e-mails from him, demanding written answers to his accusations. When she meets with Anai inside the Archives Room, Retsuko finally blows her top. She talks about this to Gori and Washimi, who both suggest to her that Retsuko should take it easy with Anai, since kids like him are scared of growing up. But when she goes looking for Anai, she discovers that he has gone on leave – first sending a fax to Director Ton about how Retsuko "abused" him. Fearing for herself, Retsuko resolves to try running away by learning how to drive. She signs up for a driving course in hopes of getting a license.
14	4	"Unavoidable Impact"	June 14, 2019
Retsuko continues to attend driving school, and befriends a laid-back donkey named Tadano. At work, the company is planning to host a Family Appreciation Day event – each Department will plan to contribute something to the food stalls. Unexpectedly, Director Ton appoints Retsuko to work with Anai to prepare the stalls for the Accounting Department. This is a nightmare for Retsuko, as she wants to be as far away from Anai as possible, so she chooses to do all the stall work alone. Haida comments on Anai not wanting to help Retsuko, but this activates Anai's defense mechanism – he writes Haida e-mails about the "attacks to his personality" and demands written responses.
15	5	"United Front"	June 14, 2019
Haida realizes what Retsuko has been facing with Anai. Retsuko and Fenneko are doing their best to keep Anai under control. All plans have failed, including asking Tsunoda to use her charm and Director Ton to use his aggressiveness. To everyone's surprise, Kabae is able to control Anai by treating him in a motherly fashion. At driving school, Tadano suggests that Retsuko should make up with Anai during the event. At Family Appreciation Day, the Accounting Department's yakisoba stall is not doing well because Retsuko is not a good cook, until Kabae manages to convince Anai to cook instead. Anai turns out to be an excellent cook and the stall becomes a runaway success. With this experience, Retsuko makes peace with Anai.
16	6	"Unknown Future"	June 14, 2019
After the event, Anai finally comes in line with the work, and he provides cheap lunch service, cooking meals and selling them to co-workers. Retsuko again considers her mother's advice about finding a suitor after realizing she is in a rut. Retsuko participates in a matchmaking party and unexpectedly meets up with Gori, who is also looking for a suitor. Both fall for the same guy, who turns out to be a paid actor. At driving school, Retsuko passes the exam and officially gets her license, but she founds out that Tadano has left the school.
17	7	"Growing Affection"	June 14, 2019
Having gotten her license, Retsuko takes her friends Gori and Washimi on a road trip. During the trip, Washimi reveals that she was married once, but got divorced after four months. This starts an intense argument between Washimi and Gori, and they begin to drift apart. The trip ends with a rivalry formed between Washimi and Gori. Retsuko ends up asking Kabae about marriage, and Kabae tells her the story of how she met her husband. The company president reports to Gori and Washimi that an entrepreneur is coming to the company to give a presentation.
18	8	"He Lives Above the Clouds"	June 14, 2019
Tadano is revealed to be the CEO of a tech company. He has been developing an AI that will introduce more automation in society. Retsuko talks about the special visitor to the company, but finds out that Gori and Washimi are still rivals. Tadano happens to meet up with Retsuko on the street, and he asks her out. Retsuko feels that she may be falling in love with Tadano, and they start to date.
19	9	"She's Dreaming"	June 14, 2019
Retsuko enjoys her new life dating Tadano, who seems too good to be true. Fenneko and Kabae derive from Retsuko's social media posts that she is dating someone rich. She joins up with Tadano on a business golf game, which unexpectedly includes Director Ton. After the game, Ton spots a paparazzo taking photos of them both, who was tipped off by Fenneko and Kabae. One night, Retsuko confesses her love to Tadano. At work, Director Ton warns Retsuko about hanging out with Tadano. News quickly spreads on social media about Retsuko's relationship with Tadano. Gori and Washimi see the news and decide to take action, putting aside their differences for Retsuko's sake. Retsuko does not worry about the bad comments on social media, but she is shocked to discover that Tadano is not interested in marriage.
20	10	"Wonderful Life"	June 14, 2019
News breaks about Retsuko's relationship, and Retsuko learns of Tadano's comments about marriage. Not willing to let him go, Retsuko decides that she might just go along with Tadano's lifestyle, with Tadano asking her to quit her job and live with him. Meanwhile, Gori and Washimi call in Haida to help out Retsuko. At work, Director Ton berates Retsuko over Tadano, saying that he is too different from her. That night, Retsuko, along with Haida, Gori, and Washimi, take Tadano to the usual karaoke bar. There, Retsuko expresses herself through karaoke, admitting that she wants marriage and that she cannot be true to herself if she stays with Tadano. Thus the relationship ends. A few days later, Retsuko moves on with her life, and they both go their separate ways.

==== Season 3 (2020) ====
No. overall	No. in season	Title	Original release date
21	1	"The Blessings of Life"	August 27, 2020
With her romance over, Retsuko fills the void with a virtual boyfriend, Seiya the unicorn, but gets reckless with in-game purchases. With her savings all but depleted, she survives by only eating bread crusts. Meanwhile, Haida learns that Anai has a girlfriend, and quickly spirals into an existential crisis about his own relationship status. Retsuko later goes on a spa trip with her mom and gets a generous amount of cash from her as gas money, and decides to treat herself to some take-out. However, things go south when she inadvertently backs into a parked minivan car in the restaurant parking lot.
22	2	"Deep in the Hole"	August 27, 2020
The leopard who owns the minivan collects Retsuko's details and but leaves before giving Retsuko his own. Paranoid about her financial straits, Retsuko goes to Gori for a quick loan, but Gori has blown her savings on a down payment to a new suite. Gori also reveals she is developing a matchmaking app, for which Retsuko becomes a beta tester to cover her original intentions. The leopard calls Retsuko back and introduces himself as Hyodo. To pay for the damages to the van, Hyodo makes an agreement with Retsuko – that Retsuko works for him to pay back the debt. Hyodo takes her to a rundown night club, where she learns that Hyodo manages an underground idol group.
23	3	"A Sheltered Life"	August 27, 2020
At the night club, Retsuko is introduced to Manaka and two other idols, who form the OTM Girls Hyodo manages. Owing to the long hours at the night club, Retsuko starts falling asleep at work. Washimi encourages Retsuko to make the best of her situation and gives her some cash to give her some relief. Retsuko decides to seize control of all of the idol group's finances from Hyodo to get them out of debt. Meanwhile, at work, Haida meets Inui, and the two quickly bond.
24	4	"Winds of Change"	August 27, 2020
The OTM Girls turn a profit for the first time thanks to Retsuko's business acumen. Retsuko also opens up an official OTM Girls social media page in order to override a fan's paparazzi-style page that had previously served as the official page. Retsuko also sets up her own video channel teaching her death metal voice to earn some ad revenue. Haida hits it off with Inui after an unexpected encounter in a record shop.
25	5	"An Urchin in the Desert"	August 27, 2020
While taking Manaka to practice her new song in a karaoke bar, Hyodo unexpectedly spots Retsuko singing death metal. The next day, Hyodo announces that the idol group will change their genre, and appoints Retsuko to be the new lead singer. Initially, Retsuko refuses, as she does not want to let the world know of her death metal singing. Manaka tells Retsuko to step up and stop worrying about stepping on other people's toes. Later that night, Retsuko is pressured into, and eventually accepts, her new role as the lead singer for the OTM Girls.
26	6	"Crossroads"	August 27, 2020
The group's popularity soars after a blogger's favorable review, thanks to Retsuko's performance in singing death metal. Hyodo proposes of selling CDs with handshake coupons that will allow the consumer to shake hands with the idols for a few seconds. The CDs sell out quickly, and the group takes off for a concert in Hokkaido. Concerned by Retsuko's odd behavior, Haida secretly tails her to Hokkaido. At Hokaiddo, Haida befriends Tadano, who flies him back to Tokyo. Back at the concert, the blogger who boosted the group's status shakes hands with Retsuko, and is revealed to be Komiya. Komiya promises Retsuko to keep her idol life a secret at work.
27	7	"An Impenetrable Wall"	August 27, 2020
The OTM Girls receive an offer to perform at a rock festival. Hyodo re-brands the idols into a band, and the members must learn how to play instruments. Haida's relationship with Inui moves along slowly and he continues to meet up with Tadano. At one night, Gori joins the two, where again they talk about Retsuko. Tadano takes interest in Gori's new matchmaking app and helps her in its development. That night, Haida calls Inui to tell her that she can visit his place to see him playing the bass.
28	8	"Bursting Her Bubble"	August 27, 2020
Manaka's devotion to instrumental mastery inspires others to step up. Retsuko ends up asking Haida to teach her how to play the guitar. Against Fenneko's warning, Haida agrees to it, and has her come the same day Inui is to come over for dinner. Retsuko comes first, learning how to play the F chord. After she leaves, Inui arrives and makes dinner. Haida is significantly more awkward around Inui than Retsuko, and upon spotting Retsuko's pink handkerchief in the bathroom, Inui abruptly leaves the house, skipping dinner. Before leaving, she asks Haida point blank if he likes her as much as she likes him.
29	9	"The End of the Moratorium"	August 27, 2020
Fenneko and Tsunoda berate Haida for his indecisiveness between Inui and Retsuko. Elsewhere, Director Ton learns about Retsuko's idol life through his daughters. While acknowledging her reasons, he warned her about the dangers of idol life, and offers her cash to pay off her remaining debt so she can leave. But Retsuko, having grown fond of Manaka and the others as well as making the group substantially profitable, declines, putting the idol group ahead of her day job. Manaka discovers that the owner of the fake OTM Girls social media page has been actively stalking Retsuko. Later at another concert, during the handshake event, a fan comes with 100 tickets, granting him with 5 minutes with Retsuko. He spends his time verbally harassing Retsuko and lambasting the nature of idol groups, much to everyone's horror.
30	10	"When You Count to Ten"	August 27, 2020
Retsuko is shaken by her encounter with the toxic fan, but denies that it is bothering her with the group. Through research from other avid fans, Hyodo discovers that the fan who accosted Retsuko also runs that fake idol group's account. Later, more photos are posted to the fake account, fully exposing Retsuko's work and home addresses and schedule. Despite Manaka's and Hyodo's warnings, Retsuko keeps assuring them that nothing will happen. The deranged fan then attempts to murder Retsuko with a box cutter at night on a busy street, but Haida quickly intervenes. During the scuffle, Retsuko bumps her head and faints. Inui assists the two, and she stops pursuing a relationship with Haida. After the assault, Retsuko shuts herself from the world, staying in her mother's house and on work leave for a few days. Haida and Fenneko discuss with Gori and Washimi about how to get Retsuko back to them. Gori signs Haida up for her matchmaking app, which much to her surprise determines he is a perfect match for Retsuko. Haida, now motivated by the app, barges into Retsuko's house and drags her out to karaoke to get their feelings off their chests. Though Retsuko once again rejects Haida's feelings, Haida promises to help keep her safe. Retsuko eventually returns to work, and shows signs of more open communication with Haida.

==== Season 4 (2021) ====
No. overall	No. in season	Title	Original release date
31	1	"Someone from Work"	December 16, 2021
After quitting the OTM Girls, Retsuko moves to a new apartment, with Haida taking her home daily for her safety. As Haida struggles to deepen their relationship, meanwhile, the company is facing heavy losses due to a failed amusement park project rejected by Washimi and the new external director, Himuro. Ton is approaching his 30th anniversary as the accounting department's director, and Retsuko is tasked to find a gift for him. Fenneko attempts to set Haida and Retsuko up on a date under the guise of having him help her, but, intimidated by Retsuko's relationships with Tadano and Manaka, he makes up an excuse to leave.
32	2	"The New Boss"	December 16, 2021
While Haida returns home, he sees the president of the company collapse near the river and helps him to a hospital. Through this incident, the next morning, Retsuko figures out that Haida had lied the previous night and becomes disappointed. At night, Haida confides in Fenneko that he feels he is too ordinary and not worthy enough to be in a relationship with Retsuko, using her relationship with Tadano and her stint as an idol as examples. The next morning, Retsuko and Haida learn that Himuro has been named the president's successor as the company's new CEO.
33	3	"Dirty Work"	December 16, 2021
Retsuko and Haida's relationship continues to be awkward, despite Fenneko's attempts. Himuro tells Ton that the company is cutting costs and requests that he downsize the accounting department. Meanwhile, Retsuko discovers that Fenneko and Tsunoda have been setting her up with Haida and demands an explanation. After work, Ton consults with Komiya which employee in their department should be removed. The next morning, he brings a blank list to Himuro and later tells his wife that he has no intention of firing anyone, especially when the accounting department survived without firing anyone during the collapse of the bubble economy in the 1980s.
34	4	"Unkept Promises"	December 16, 2021
Haida learns from his bandmate that his girlfriend had dumped him for having no career progression. During a drunken night out with Fenneko, Retsuko becomes frustrated about Haida's lack of confidence in pursuing a relationship with her. On their way home, Himuro takes the two to dinner as an apology for splashing a puddle on them, and in their drunken stupor, they complain about Ton. Soon after, Retsuko seeks advice from Manaka, who advises her that she and Haida are incompatible. When Haida takes Retsuko home the day after, she tells him he no longer needs to do so and that she prefers they stay as friends. Using Retsuko's feedback, Himuro reassigns Ton to the "career experience design" department, with his new office being a storage room isolated from the company building.
35	5	"Options"	December 16, 2021
Ton is given no work, and despite stating otherwise, Tsubone discovers the reality of his situation. Tsunoda confronts Retsuko about her feelings for Haida, and under Okami and Gori's advice, Retsuko visits Haida to tell him that, while she is still unsure about her feelings, she is interested in him. The two go on a date and Haida becomes motivated at work. Meanwhile, Bibanuma offers a generous severance package to Kabae if she resigns voluntarily. Later, Himuro acknowledges that Kabae and Ton will leave on their own eventually through the realization that the company no longer needs them. As Ton falls into depression, he briefly contemplates jumping in front of a train.
36	6	"Struggle for Survival"	December 16, 2021
Ton eventually quits his job but continues to maintain a facade in front of his family. Retsuko and the others begin to notice that Kabae has been working harder and has become less livelier than usual, causing them to suspect that the higher management may be targeting her as their next lay-off. Kabae begins missing work when her youngest son becomes sick, but even with Retsuko, Haida, and Anai covering her workload, the higher management finally convinces her to resign. Meanwhile, Haida's dedication to work and quick completion of tasks catches Himuro's interest.
37	7	"Moving Up"	December 16, 2021
After his suggestion for improving work flow is approved by Himuro, Haida becomes more encouraged to work following positive feedback. While meeting with Manaka, Retsuko learns that Ton is now working at the convenience store with her. Retsuko feels guilty, despite Haida, Gori, and Washimi assuring her otherwise. Himuro becomes impressed with Haida's work ethic and promotes him as the director of the accounting department, replacing Yagyu. Meanwhile, Retsuko meets with Tadano.
38	8	"Headhunting"	December 16, 2021
Retsuko asks Tadano for advice on helping Ton, and he suggests that she can work her online video channel that she once used to post her death metal song covers. Once she is successful enough to monetize her channel, she hires Ton as her accountant. As Retsuko becomes busier, Haida starts feeling insecure again, especially after discovering her channel and seeing Tadano take her home. This causes him to focus more on his job, and during a discussion with Himuro, the latter entrusts him with a special job that must be kept secret. When Retsuko returns to the office to retrieve Ton's air humidifier, she catches a glimpse of Haida's computer, containing an open spreadsheet of the accounting data she had worked on.
39	9	"Unauthorized Access"	December 16, 2021
As Retsuko becomes suspicious about Haida, the accounting department's office goes under construction while Haida moves to his own suite. After work, Haida runs into Inui, who suggests he pays more attention to Retsuko. Meanwhile, Retsuko employs help from Kabae, Fenneko, and Ton to break into Haida's office and analyze the data on his computer. Ton suspects that Haida is inflating profits on the company's account book and suggests they find the true data. Retsuko visits Haida to confirm, but he gets angry over her doubting him. When Haida reports to Himuro the next morning, he questions the integrity of their actions, but Himuro convinces him not to waver, as it shows weakness. At dinner, Washimi asks Himuro what he thinks of Retsuko, and he answers that he sees her as obedient rather than rebellious.
40	10	"Rendezvous"	December 16, 2021
With help from Hyodo, Fenneko, Kabae, Ton, and Ton's wife, Retsuko breaks into Haida's office to steal the true accounting data from a USB drive that he keeps in a safe. After Haida realizes his relationship with Retsuko has worsened, he confronts Tadano about his relationship with Retsuko, but Tadano calmly shows him there are no more than friendship. Later that night, Ton brings Haida to Retsuko's karaoke booth, where she attempts to convince him to stop manipulating the accounting data. Haida snaps at her over his feelings of inferiority, but she put clear that no one deserves to do something too dirty to prove his capability. The next day, Haida suggests to Himuro that they stop, as several employees are aware of their actions, but when Himuro dismisses him affirming he is disposable, he finally stands up for himself and confronts him through an arm-wrestling match affirming that, while disposable, this time he is his enemy. Retsuko helps Haida defeat Himuro with a death metal growl that manifests as a laser beam, causing both to be shot through a window and land on a scaffolding. Himuro and Haida quit the company, while the original president, Ton, and Kabae return. However, Haida is more confident about himself, and, when he joins Retsuko for a date, he finally can see Tadano in admiration.

==== Season 5 (2023) ====
No. overall	No. in season	Title	Original release date
41	1	"A Prison Called Freedom"	February 16, 2023
Haida spends all of his time and money on a gacha MMORPG with an online friend, Shikabane, which concerns Retsuko. Gori and Washimi tell Retsuko that she is enabling Haida's lazy behavior by being too easy on him. Haida's brother, Jiro, informs him that he will be evicted from his apartment, that was being provided to him by his father for free, at the end of the month because they found a new tenant. Shortly after being told this, Retsuko calls him and informs him that she will not be seeing him until he finds a job.
42	2	"Spooky Shikabane"	February 16, 2023
Without a job, home, and a girlfriend, Haida takes shelter in an internet café and has an awkward encounter with Shikabane, who turns out to be a girl who appears male online to thwart creepy guys. She lives in the café and freelances to sustain her lifestyle. Haida begins working a construction job to earn some money. Exhausted, he passes out and Shikabane brings him to her booth in the café. Retsuko sees that he has read her messages but has not replied, leading her to think that he is cheating on her with his online friend.
43	3	"ANAGURA and Reality"	February 16, 2023
Under the avatar Fennelope, Fenneko makes a friendship with Haida and Shikabane in the online videogame and makes a meeting with them so they can meet each other. The whole office is embroiled in this drama, and stakes out the local diner to see who Haida's gaming partner is. Fenneko calls off the meeting so she does not reveal her identity, and the whole office tails them back to the net café and it is revealed that Haida and Shikabane are sharing a booth there. Retsuko releases her rage, and allows Haida to move into her apartment. Shikabane is seen looking for a new gaming partner ingame.
44	4	"Restart"	February 16, 2023
A month passes and Haida is unsuccessful in finding a job, while Retsuko becomes increasingly annoyed at Haida for every little thing he does. He has a chance encounter with Retsuko's mother, who finds out he is living with Retsuko. Haida must visit Retsuko's parents in two weeks for a proper introduction. His job search intensifies, but he is unsuccessful in finding a new job as he is too honest about why he left his previous job. Retsuko hatches a plan to lie to her parents about her boyfriend's job situation, but Haida breaks down during the visit and tells the truth. Her parents, although seemingly okay with the truth, do not approve of Haida.
45	5	"A Mysterious Messenger"	February 16, 2023
A mysterious man, later revealed to be Ikari, approaches Manaka after a concert and asks about Aggretsuko, and is chased off as a stalker. Manaka stops by Retsuko's apartment to warn her. Haida starts a part time job at a grocery store, and his coworkers give him a gift of persimmons to take home. Desperate to get rid of them, Haida messages his friends. Ominously, Shikabane does not respond. Haida meets Tadano to give him the persimmons, and is given encouragement to continue with his nascent coding career.
46	6	"A Family Emergency"	February 16, 2023
Haida is called to his family's house to discuss "family matters". Despite Haida dissuading her, Retsuko insists in joining him to visit his family to make proper introductions. As they pull up to the ornate house, Haida informs Retsuko that his father is a politician in the National Diet. After exchanging initial greetings, Retsuko is shown to Haida's childhood room while Haida's father tries to buy his cooperation as to not cause negative attention while his younger brother Jiro runs for office in the upcoming election. Haida and Retsuko stay for dinner, where Haida and his father get into a political argument. As the two leave the house, Jiro gives Haida an envelope of money before mocking him for taking it.
47	7	"Rage Mission"	February 16, 2023
Ikari approaches Retsuko and he expresses to her his ardent desire that she runs as a candidate to the National Diet. He reveals himself to be the last seat member of the Party of Rage, and with the upcoming election looming, he would like Retsuko to serve as the party's candidate, hoping to inspire young voters who are disillusioned by the state of Japan held up by the conservative older population. She refuses multiple times until she is kidnapped by her former band mates and pressured to announce her candidacy on stage.
48	8	"Rising to the Challenge"	February 16, 2023
The day after she gets into the stage with Ikari, Retsuko feels overwhelmed by the tension... and the regret. As she enters work that morning, she sees that the news is awash with her announcement to run, and full of her death metal clips. She is embarrassed at first, but with the encouragement and support from her coworkers, she shoulders the work. Haida returns to his family residency to return the money to Jiro.
49	9	"A Disconnected World"	February 16, 2023
Ikari discusses the optimal district to run in, which ends up to be the same political district that Jiro is running. Additionally, Ikari informs Retsuko that she needs to come up with 3 million yen to put down as a deposit, refunded if she receives at least 10% of the vote. The financial barrier is a measure to avoid joke candidates from running. She and Haida brainstorm ideas to come up with the money, including crowdfunding and asking Retsuko's parents for money, which are not successful. Tadano offers up the net cafe space as a political base as no other venues take the Party of Rage seriously. Gori and Washimi visit the office and donate the remaining deposit money required.
50	10	"The Other Side of Rage"	February 16, 2023
Retsuko tries to find her voice when it comes to campaigning, but it does not come naturally to her. When the pressure almost overwhelms her, Retsuko speaks with Director Ton, who encourages her to take the mic and speak to her potential voters. She unleashes her rage, and gains a following, making her competitor Jiro nervous. One night while cleaning the office, Haida is hit by a truck as a warning message. Undeterred, Retsuko continues campaigning after she and Haida file for a marriage certificate. On the last campaign day, Retsuko has a large turnout, causing Jiro to go off the script from his father's playbook and announce his support for a mandatory retirement age for politicians. The next day, Jiro wins by a landslide, although there was also historic voter turnout. Retsuko brings Shikabane to her karaoke booth for her so she can vent her frustrations with the world. Jiro approaches Haida and Retsuko and tells them that he had no part in the scare tactic that injured Haida. In Retsuko and Haida's apartment, a new family photo with Retsuko's parents include Haida, meaning that they finally approve of him. Retsuko sends Haida off for his first day of work, while Shikabane is seen contemplating the rental rates for apartment units.

== Reception ==
=== Critical reception ===
==== Season 1 ====
The first season of the Netflix series holds a 100% on Rotten Tomatoes based on 25 reviews, with the sites critic consensus reading, "Uniquely bleak for a Sanrio property, Aggretsuko balances biting corporate satire with adorable characters and absurdist comedy to create a surprising, insightful addition to the world of animation." The season has been praised for its satirical portrayal of Japan's workplace culture, and of the pressures facing Millennial women in the workforce. IndieWire gave the season a B+, and noted the distinctly Japanese stylistic elements of the animation that made it stand out from American productions. The A.V. Club praised Aggretsuko for dealing with mature themes like misogyny and workplace anxiety, but criticized the season's romantic subplot, calling it "aggressively lousy".

==== Christmas Special ====
Aiden Strawhun of IGN stated that the special "takes the fun of the first season and spinkles in a smidge of holiday flair" and complimented the special for its commentary on social media addiction, but says it was diminished by "feel[ing] like more of the same" as the preceding season. Polygon writer Allegra Frank called the special "heartwarming" and said that it "deserves to be a holiday classic." Allegra commented on Haida and his infatuation for Retsuko, calling him "the pinnacle of an adorable love interest."

==== Season 2 ====
The second season holds a 100% on Rotten Tomatoes based on 8 reviews. Caitlin Moore of The Daily Dot wrote that the second season was "less satisfying" than the first, noting how the season focused more on Retsuko's "personal journey", thereby making it less relatable to a general audience, but called the season "fun in the moment." Charlie Ceates of Cultured Vultures said the season has "much of the same charm as its predecessor" but pointed out that the plot progression closely mirrored that of the first season and how the show "may stagnate and get boring" if future seasons did the same.

==== Season 3 ====
The third season holds a 100% on Rotten Tomatoes based on 5 reviews. Karen Han from Polygon praised the season for tackling "more specific and modern issues", such as parasocial relationships between fans and celebrities on social media, but criticized the season taking a "straight thriller" turn along with the status quo ending for hurting the show's relatability. Jacob Oller from The Spool wrote that the season was "all sorts of fun" and that "Aggretsuko continues to resonate, echoing through the skulls of rage-filled office workers everywhere," while praising the relatability of the anti-capitalist attitude possessed by Retsuko.

==== Season 4 ====
IGN writer Britteny Vincent wrote that Season 4 "brings the absurdity and laughs to the reality of a manipulative workplace" but criticized the dynamic between Retsuko and Haida, referring to them as two of the show's "most frustrating characters", for diluting the overall experience. Petrena Radulovic of Polygon wrote that the fourth season "should inspire everyone to unionize their workplace", and praised the show's ability to balance "wild scenarios with more specific and relatable situations."

==== Season 5 ====
The fifth season holds an 86% rating on Rotten Tomatoes based on 7 reviews.

=== Awards ===
Aggretsuko was nominated for an Ursa Major Award in the Best Dramatic Series category. The Ursa Major awards are given in the field of furry fandom works and are the main awards in the field of anthropomorphism.
