= Dia Horizon =

Japanese media franchise created by Square Enix

ディアホライゾン (Dia Horaizon)
- Video game
- Platform: Android, iOS
- Released: JP: August 24, 2017
- Manga
- Published by: Square Enix
- Magazine: Manga Up!
- Original run: August 7, 2017 – present
- Original net animation
- Studio: Fanworks
- Released: August 10, 2017 – August 21, 2017
- Episodes: 3
- Anime television series
- Directed by: Haruki Kasugamori
- Written by: Yuki Takabayashi
- Studio: Fanworks
- Original network: Tokyo MX
- Original run: October 3, 2017 – December 19, 2017
- Episodes: 12

Dia Horizon (ディアホライゾン, Dia Horaizon) is a Japanese media franchise created by Square Enix. It primarily consists of a smartphone game that was released on Android and iOS devices on August 24, 2017, and an anime television series that aired from October to December 2017. An ONA series was streamed online from August 10 to 21, 2017. A 4-panel manga adaptation is serialized online via the official Dia Horizon website. Another manga series is serialized online via Square Enix's digital publication Manga Up! from August 7, 2017. A novel written by Ghost Mikawa, titled Dia Horizon: Akatsuki no Keiyakusha, is being serialized online via Kadokawa's Kakuyomu website.

== Development ==
Dia Horizon was announced by Square Enix as a "mixed media project" with a trailer in July 2017. The smartphone game was released on Android and iOS devices in Japan on August 24, 2017, and an anime television series aired in Japan from October to December 2017. A 4-panel manga adaptation is serialized online via the official Dia Horizon website. Another manga series is serialized online via Square Enix's digital publication Manga UP! beginning from August 7, 2017. A novel written by Ghost Mikawa, titled Dia Horizon: Akatsuki no Keiyakusha, was serialized online via Kadokawa's Kakuyomu website. The game featured a one mission Yen prize for surviving the "Party Annihilation Challenge" where players must swipe away enemies before they are defeated. The game was discontinued on May 31, 2018, along with King's Knight, another Square Enix fantasy mobile game.

== Anime ==
The anime series was a set of five-minute episodes, which combined elements from the game with a modern office worker's life.

== Game ==
The game follows the player as a hero leading a group of adventurers to battle monsters in a dungeon. The player forms a team of four characters, purchasing different adventurers with different stats and prices. During battle, the player can either manually control the characters' attacks or let the game control it.
