= Brian the Sun =

Japanese rock band

- Origin: Osaka, Japan
- Genres: Rock
- Years active: 2007—2020
- Labels: Epic Records Japan
- Members: Ryota Mori; Haruki Hakuyama; Shinji Ogawa; Shunta Tanaka
- Past members: Kinto Matsukura; Junhiro Kamata; Ami Morishita

Brian the Sun is a Japanese rock band from Osaka.

== History ==
The band was formed in 2007 in Osaka by Ryota Mori and Haruki Hakuyama. The name was inspired by the Arctic Monkeys song Brianstorm.

The band's songs have been used for numerous Anime series' including 'Heroes' being used for My Hero Academia, 'Maybe' being used for Sweetness and Lightning and 'Sunny Side Up' used for Please Take My Brother Away!.

== Discography ==
=== Singles ===
	Release date	title	Format	Standard product number	Peak chart position	Recording album
Independent production board
1st	12/07/2009	Canary	CD			13月の夜明け(Brian the Sun) シュレディンガーの猫(シュレディンガーの猫)
2nd	06/02/2010	Baked plum cake E.P	CD			NON SUGAR
3rd	05/08/2010	都会の泉	CD			シュレディンガーの猫
4th	02/04/2011	cloudy#2/Hello Goodbye	CD			パトスとエートス/(未収録)
5th	30/11/2011	虹/はちみつ	CD			シュレディンガーの猫/NON SUGAR
National distribution board
1st	04/07/2012	Sister	CD	PTBC-0001		NON SUGAR
2nd	06/03/2013	Baked Plum Cake	CD	PTBC-0002	195	NON SUGAR
Major board
1st	01/06/2016	HEROES	CD+DVD; CD; CD	ESCL-4636/7(初回生産限定盤); ESCL-4638(通常盤); ESCL-4639(期間生産限定盤)	33	Pathos and Ethos
2nd	07/09/2016	Maybe	CD+DVD; CD; CD	ESCL-4681/2(初回生産限定盤); ESCL-4683(通常盤); ESCL-4684(期間生産限定盤)	54	Pathos and Ethos
3rd	15/11/2017	Cafune	CD+DVD; CD; CD+DVD	ESCL-4926/7(初回生産限定盤); ESCL-4928(通常盤); ESCL-4929/30(期間生産限定盤)	71	the Sun
4th	09/01/2019	Lonely Go!	CD+DVD; CD; CD	ESCL-5145/6(初回生産限定盤); ESCL-5147(通常盤); ESCL-5148(期間生産限定盤)	54	MEME
5th	20/11/2019	Paradigm shift	CD+DVD; CD	ESCL-5290/1(初回生産限定盤); ESCL-5292(通常盤)	124	

=== Distribution limited single ===
	Release date	title	Format
1st	06/05/2015	Absolute Zero	Digital download
2nd	28/10/2018	Lonely Go! (Anime ver.)	Digital download

=== Mini Album ===
	Release date	title	Format	Standard product number	Peak chart position
Indie board
1st	12/03/2014	She is Zero Philia	CD	XQLU-1002	109
2nd	25/11/2015	Schrodinger's cat	CD	DDCB-14039	100
Major board
1st	05/07/2017	SUNNY SIDE UP	CD+DVD; CD	ESCL-4877/8(初回生産限定盤); ESCL-4879(通常盤)	80
2nd	26/02/2020	orbit	CD+DVD; CD	ESCL-5350/1(初回生産限定盤); ESCL-5352(通常盤)	181

=== Album ===
	Release date	title	Format	Standard product number	Peak chart position
Indie board
1st	05/06/2013	NON SUGAR	CD	XQLU-1001	179
2nd	03/12/2014	Brian the Sun	CD	DDCB-14031	107
Major board
1st	11/01/2017	Pathos and Ethos	CD+DVD; CD	ESCL-4682/3(初回生産限定盤); ESCL-4784(通常盤)	44
2nd	10/01/2018	the Sun	CD+DVD; CD	ESCL-4952/3(初回生産限定盤); ESCL-4954(通常盤)	49
3rd	13/03/2019	MEME	CD+DVD; CD	ESCL-5188/9(初回生産限定盤); ESCL-5190(通常盤)	110
