= Gigant Big-Shot Tsukasa =

Japanese anime television series

- Promotional poster of the series.

超爆裂異次元メンコバトル ギガントシューター つかさ (Chō-Bakuretsu I-Jigen Menko Batoru Giganto Shūtā Tsukasa)
- Genre: Comedy
- Anime television series
- Directed by: Ryōichi Mori
- Written by: Toru Hosokawa
- Music by: Hideharu Mori
- Studio: Fanworks, Forest Hunting One
- Original network: NHK E
- Original run: April 1, 2014 – February 10, 2015
- Episodes: 32

Chō-Bakuretsu I-Jigen Menko Battle Gigant Shooter Tsukasa (超爆裂異次元メンコバトル ギガントシューター つかさ, Chō-Bakuretsu I-Jigen Menko Batoru Giganto Shūtā Tsukasa; lit. 'Super Explosive Card Battle Gigant Shooter Tsukasa') is a 32-episode comedy and card battle anime television series produced by Bushiroad. It is animated by Fanworks and Forest Hunting One, and ran on NHK E from April 1, 2014, to February 10, 2015. An English dub of the series aired on May 27, 2017, on Disney XD Asia., under the title Gigant Big-Shot Tsukasa.

== Characters ==
Tsukasa Mendō (面道 つかさ, Mendō Tsukasa)
Voiced by: Kappei Yamaguchi
Miruko Koide (小出 ミ子, Koide Miruko)
Voiced by: Sora Tokui
Manabu Numata (沼田 マナブ, Numata Manabu)
Voiced by: Izumi Kitta
Ataru Dōmoto (堂本 あたる, Dōmoto Ataru)
Voiced by: Aimi
M. Kirito Kiritani (桐谷 M. キリト, Kiritani M. Kirito)
Voiced by: Tomohiro Yamaguchi
