= Please Take My Brother Away! =

Chinese webcomic

Please Take My Brother Away! (Chinese: 快把我哥带走, known in Japan as Ani ni Tsukeru Kusuri wa Nai! (兄に付ける薬はない！; transl. "There's No Cure for My Brother!")) is a Chinese web manhua series by You.Ling (幽·灵).

In 2017, the series was adapted into a Japanese television short anime series by Fanworks and Imagineer with Japanese and Mandarin Chinese voices. It aired from April to June 2017, on Tokyo MX. The second season aired from July to December 2018. A third season aired from October to December 2019. The story follows a pair of siblings – a younger sister who is violent, Shi Miao, and her older brother Shi Fen. On June 17, 2020, it was announced that the fourth season will air in October 2020 on Tokyo MX. A fifth season will premiere in July 2022.

The series was also adapted into a Chinese television drama named Take My Brother Away and a film named Go Brother! in 2018.

== Characters ==
Shi Fen (時分; Shīfun (シーフン))
Voiced by: Bian Jiang (Mandarin); Yuichi Nakamura (Japanese)
The older brother, Shi Fen is a first year at high school. He is occasionally getting beaten up by his sister due to his stupid tendencies.
Shi Miao (時秒; Shīmyo (シーミョ))
Voiced by: Xiaoliansha (Mandarin); Sora Amamiya (Japanese)
The younger sister, Shi Miao is a third year at middle school. Her speciality is sports.
Zhen Kaixin (甄開心; Kaishin (カイシン))
Voiced by: Huang Zhenji (Mandarin); Kenshō Ono (Japanese)
Shi Fen's best friend. Shi Miao is in love with him.
Miaomiao (妙妙; Myōmyō (ミョウミョウ))
Voiced by: Xinyue Bingbing (Mandarin); Chitose Morinaga (Japanese)
Shi Miao's best friend.
Wan Sui (萬歲; Banzai (バンザイ))
Voiced by: Zhang Jie (Mandarin); Natsuki Hanae (Japanese)
A rich guy who transferred schools so people wouldn't look at him for his wealth. He becomes Shi Fen and Kai Xin's best friend. He likes Shi Miao.
Wan Xing (萬幸; Banshin (バンシン))
Voiced by: Dingdang (Mandarin); Natsuki Hanae (Japanese)
Wan Sui's little brother.

== Media ==
=== Web manhua ===
The web manhua is written and illustrated by You.Ling. It is published by Kuaikan Manhua. Two compilations were released by the China Friendship Publishing Company. The web manhua has been read more than 500 million times in China online.

Volume	Release date	ISBN	Source
1	September 25, 2015	ISBN 978-7-5057-3587-3	
2	September 8, 2016	ISBN 978-7-5057-3797-6	

=== Anime ===
A 12-episode short anime by Fanworks premiered at Tokyo MX from April 7 to June 23, 2017, and in China in March with each episode 3–4 minutes in length. Brian the Sun performed the opening song titled "Sunny Side Up". Rareko directed and wrote the scripts at Imagineer and Fanworks. Tencent Penguin Pictures planned the project.

A 24-episode second-season premiere from July 9 to December 17, 2018. Youkemao (佑可貓) performed the opening song titled "Let Him Go!!".

A 12-episode third season premiered from October 7 to December 23, 2019. Wang Yue (王玥) performed the opening song titled "Progressive Youth" (進撃的青春).

A 12-episode fourth season premiered in October 2020.

A 12-episode fifth season premiered in June 2022.

=== Season 1 (2017) ===
Story	Episode	Title	Directed by	Written by	Original release date
1	1	Transliteration: "Shiteki Ani" (Japanese: 私的兄)	Rarecho	Rarecho	April 7, 2017
2	2	Transliteration: "Kikiteki Houkago" (Japanese: 危機的放課後)	Rarecho	Rarecho	April 14, 2017
3	3	Transliteration: "Keiteki Igen" (Japanese: 兄的威厳)	Rarecho	Rarecho	April 21, 2017
4	4	Transliteration: "Ren'aiteki Shokudou" (Japanese: 恋愛的食堂)	Rarecho	Rarecho	April 28, 2017
5	5	Transliteration: "Kisekiteki Saikai" (Japanese: 奇跡的再会)	Rarecho	Rarecho	May 5, 2017
6	6	Transliteration: "Shokuyokuteki Doushi" (Japanese: 食欲的同志)	Rarecho	Rarecho	May 12, 2017
7	7	Transliteration: "Jibyouteki Renbo" (Japanese: 時秒的恋慕)	Rarecho	Rarecho	May 19, 2017
8	8	Transliteration: "Kizokuteki Yuuutsu" (Japanese: 貴族的憂鬱)	Rarecho	Rarecho	May 26, 2017
9	9	Transliteration: "Totsuzenteki Raikyaku" (Japanese: 突然的来客)	Rarecho	Rarecho	June 2, 2017
10	10	Transliteration: "Jibunteki Bousou" (Japanese: 時分的暴走)	Rarecho	Rarecho	June 9, 2017
11	11	Transliteration: "Jibyouteki Yuuutsu" (Japanese: 時秒的憂鬱)	Rarecho	Rarecho	June 16, 2017
12	12	Transliteration: "Kyoudaiteki Nichijou" (Japanese: 兄妹的日常)	Rarecho	Rarecho	June 23, 2017

=== Season 2 (2018) ===
Story	Episode	Title	Directed by	Written by	Original release date
13	1	Transliteration: "Gunjiteki Kunren" (Japanese: 軍事的訓練)	Rarecho	Rarecho	July 9, 2018
14	2	Transliteration: "Kyouteki Sandan" (Japanese: 兄的算段)	Rarecho	Rarecho	July 16, 2018
15	3	Transliteration: "Kiseiteki Ani" (Japanese: 寄生的兄)	Rarecho	Rarecho	July 23, 2018
16	4	Transliteration: "Akudouteki Chousen" (Japanese: 悪童的挑戦)	Rarecho	Rarecho	July 30, 2018
17	5	Transliteration: "Heiminteki Seikatsu" (Japanese: 平民的生活)	Rarecho	Rarecho	August 6, 2018
18	6	Transliteration: "Shakunetsuteki Houkago" (Japanese: 灼熱的放課後)	Rarecho	Rarecho	August 13, 2018
19	7	Transliteration: "Shougekiteki Houfuku" (Japanese: 衝撃的報復)	Rarecho	Rarecho	August 20, 2018
20	8	Transliteration: "Kaiiteki Tenkousei" (Japanese: 怪異的転校生)	Rarecho	Rarecho	August 27, 2018
21	9	Transliteration: "Koufukuteki Shokudou" (Japanese: 幸福的食堂)	Rarecho	Rarecho	September 3, 2018
22	10	Transliteration: "Ninkimonoteki Kunou" (Japanese: 人気者的苦悩)	Rarecho	Rarecho	September 10, 2018
23	11	Transliteration: "Kizokuteki Kyuujitsu" (Japanese: 貴族的休日)	Rarecho	Rarecho	September 17, 2018
24	12	Transliteration: "Kizokuteki Naitei" (Japanese: 貴族的内偵)	Rarecho	Rarecho	September 24, 2018
25	13	Transliteration: "Touhiteki Suimin" (Japanese: 逃避的睡眠)	Rarecho	Rarecho	October 1, 2018
26	14	Transliteration: "Shouninteki Ganbou" (Japanese: 承認的願望)	Rarecho	Rarecho	October 8, 2018
27	15	Transliteration: "Ren'aiteki Yokan" (Japanese: 恋愛的予感)	Rarecho	Rarecho	October 15, 2018
28	16	Transliteration: "Himitsuteki Kokuhaku" (Japanese: 秘密的告白)	Rarecho	Rarecho	October 22, 2018
29	17	Transliteration: "Seishinteki Gaishou" (Japanese: 精神的外傷)	Rarecho	Rarecho	October 29, 2018
30	18	Transliteration: "Zetsubouteki Baka" (Japanese: 絶望的馬鹿)	Rarecho	Rarecho	November 5, 2018
31	19	Transliteration: "Zeijakuteki Yuujou" (Japanese: 脆弱的友情)	Rarecho	Rarecho	November 12, 2018
32	20	Transliteration: "Kanbiteki Kankei" (Japanese: 甘美的関係)	Rarecho	Rarecho	November 19, 2018
33	21	Transliteration: "Kodokuteki Ieji" (Japanese: 孤独的家路)	Rarecho	Rarecho	November 26, 2018
34	22	Transliteration: "Dahateki Koudou" (Japanese: 打破的行動)	Rarecho	Rarecho	December 3, 2018
35	23	Transliteration: "Shiimyoteki Tanjoubi" (Japanese: 時秒的誕生日)	Rarecho	Rarecho	December 10, 2018
36	24	Transliteration: "Juujitsuteki Ichinichi" (Japanese: 充実的一日)	Rarecho	Rarecho	December 17, 2018

=== Season 3 (2019) ===
Story	Episode	Title	Directed by	Written by	Original release date
37	1	Transliteration: "Seishunteki Shiosai" (Japanese: 青春的潮騒)	Rarecho	Rarecho	October 7, 2019
38	2	Transliteration: "Kandouteki Zenkou" (Japanese: 感動的善行)	Rarecho	Rarecho	October 14, 2019
39	3	Transliteration: "Koufukuteki Kanbou" (Japanese: 幸福的感冒)	Rarecho	Rarecho	October 21, 2019
40	4	Transliteration: "Choukeiteki Sekimu" (Japanese: 長兄的責務)	Rarecho	Rarecho	October 28, 2019
41	5	Transliteration: "Shakunetsuteki Kankin" (Japanese: 灼熱的監禁)	Rarecho	Rarecho	November 4, 2019
42	6	Transliteration: "Attouteki Doryoku" (Japanese: 圧倒的努力)	Rarecho	Rarecho	November 11, 2019
43	7	Transliteration: "Ganmenteki Kaihen" (Japanese: 顔面的改変)	Rarecho	Rarecho	November 18, 2019
44	8	Transliteration: "Zettaiteki Binbou" (Japanese: 絶対的貧乏)	Rarecho	Rarecho	November 25, 2018
45	9	Transliteration: "Kounaiteki Seisou" (Japanese: 校内的清掃)	Rarecho	Rarecho	December 2, 2019
46	10	Transliteration: "Hanchouteki Shikaku" (Japanese: 班長的資格)	Rarecho	Rarecho	December 9, 2019
47	11	Transliteration: "Setsuyakuteki Seikatsu" (Japanese: 節約的生活)	Rarecho	Rarecho	December 16, 2019
48	12	Transliteration: "Futsugouteki Yuushou" (Japanese: 不都合的優勝)	Rarecho	Rarecho	December 23, 2019

=== Season 4 (2020) ===
Story	Episode	Title	Directed by	Written by	Original release date
49	1	Transliteration: "Jibun Teki Dan" (Japanese: 時分 的 断 捨離)	Rarecho	Rarecho	October 2, 2020
50	2	Transliteration: "Futsugō Teki Shinjitsu" (Japanese: 不都合 的 真実)	Rarecho	Rarecho	October 9, 2020
51	3	Transliteration: "Hiraki Shinteki Mondai" (Japanese: 開 心的 問題)	Rarecho	Rarecho	October 16, 2020
52	4	Transliteration: "Tsūgaku Teki Jitensha" (Japanese: 通学 的 自転車)	Rarecho	Rarecho	October 23, 2020
53	5	Transliteration: "Bujutsu Teki Tatsujin" (Japanese: 武術 的 達人)	Rarecho	Rarecho	October 30, 2020
54	6	Transliteration: "Rifujin Teki Shimei" (Japanese: 理不尽 的 指名)	Rarecho	Rarecho	November 6, 2020
55	7	Transliteration: "Kyoei Teki Fukkin" (Japanese: 虚栄 的 腹筋)	Rarecho	Rarecho	November 13, 2020
56	8	Transliteration: "Shomin Teki Yokujō" (Japanese: 庶民 的 浴場)	Rarecho	Rarecho	November 20, 2020
57	9	Transliteration: "Danshi Teki Nettō" (Japanese: 男子 的 熱闘)	Rarecho	Rarecho	November 27, 2020
58	10	Transliteration: "Genkaku Teki Otome" (Japanese: 厳格 的 乙女)	Rarecho	Rarecho	December 4, 2020
59	11	Transliteration: "Kishō Teki Ippin" (Japanese: 希少 的 逸品)	Rarecho	Rarecho	December 11, 2020
60	12	Transliteration: "Hitsuzen Teki Kaikō" (Japanese: 必然 的 邂逅)	Rarecho	Rarecho	December 18, 2020

=== Season 5 (2022) ===
Story	Episode	Title	Directed by	Written by	Original release date
61	1	(Japanese: 友情的焼肉)	Ryōsuke Aoike	Ryōsuke Aoike	July 29, 2022
62	2	(Japanese: 川辺的焼肉)	Ryōsuke Aoike	Ryōsuke Aoike	August 5, 2022
63	3	(Japanese: 妹的彼氏)	Ryōsuke Aoike	Ryōsuke Aoike	August 12, 2022
64	4	(Japanese: 嫌的虫)	Ryōsuke Aoike	Ryōsuke Aoike	August 19, 2022
65	5	(Japanese: 暗記的方法)	Ryōsuke Aoike	Ryōsuke Aoike	August 26, 2022
66	6	(Japanese: 万歳的夢)	Ryōsuke Aoike	Ryōsuke Aoike	September 2, 2022
67	7	(Japanese: 遊園地的花火)	Ryōsuke Aoike	Ryōsuke Aoike	September 9, 2022
68	8	(Japanese: 子猫的誘惑)	Ryōsuke Aoike	Ryōsuke Aoike	September 16, 2022
69	9	(Japanese: 時秒的料理)	Ryōsuke Aoike	Ryōsuke Aoike	September 23, 2022
70	10	(Japanese: 買物的恐怖)	Ryōsuke Aoike	Ryōsuke Aoike	September 30, 2022
71	11	(Japanese: 鍛錬的器具)	Ryōsuke Aoike	Ryōsuke Aoike	October 7, 2022
72	12	(Japanese: 期末的試験)	Ryōsuke Aoike	Ryōsuke Aoike	October 14, 2022

=== Live action ===
In 2018, Netflix premiered a live action version named Take My Brother Away in the format of a television drama.
