= Fanworks (animation studio) =

Japanese animation studio

Fanworks Inc.
- Native name: 株式会社ファンワークス
- Romanized name: Kabushiki-gaisha fanwākusu
- Type: Kabushiki gaisha
- Industry: Japanese animation
- Founded: August 8, 2005; 21 years ago
- Headquarters: Sendagaya, Shibuya, Tokyo, Japan
- Key people: Akira Takayama (CEO)
- Website: fanworks.co.jp

Fanworks Inc. (Japanese: 株式会社ファンワークス, Hepburn: Kabushiki-gaisha fanwākusu) is a Japanese animation studio based in Sendagaya, Shibuya, Tokyo. The studio was founded on August 8, 2005, and has produced anime works including Aggretsuko, Dinosaur Biyori, Please Take My Brother Away!, and Ore, Tsushima.

== Works ==
=== Television series ===
Title	Director(s)	First run start date	First run end date	Eps	Note(s)	Ref(s)
Gakkatsu!	Rareko	April 3, 2012	September 18, 2012	25	Original work.	
Gakkatsu! 2nd Season	Rareko	January 16, 2013	September 25, 2013	25	Second season of Gakkatsu!.	
Tiny Twin Bears	Tetsurou Kodama	January 17, 2013	February 21, 2013	26	Based on a picture book.	
Gigant Big-Shot Tsukasa	Ryouichi Mori	April 1, 2014	February 10, 2015	32	Based on a card game. Co-produced with Forest Hunting One.	
Tiny Twin Bears 2nd Season	Yuuji Umoto	September 25, 2014	March 26, 2015	26	Second season of Tiny Twin Bears.	
Sushi and Beyond	Rareko	April 12, 2015	October 11, 2015	24	Based on a book written by Michael Booth.	
Tiny Twin Bears 3rd Season	Yuuji Umoto	January 21, 2016	March 24, 2016	10	Third season of Tiny Twin Bears.	
Aggretsuko	Rareko	April 2, 2016	March 31, 2018	100	Original work.	
Honobono Log	Kumi Matsui	June 7, 2016	June 18, 2016	10	Based on an illustration book written by Naka Fukamichi.	
Steel Orchestra	Masahiko Ohta	October 10, 2016	December 26, 2016	12	Based on a smartphone game of the same name.	
Akindo Sei no Little Peso	Ryousuke Aoike	April 3, 2017	June 19, 2017	12	Based on a smartphone game of the same name. Co-produced with Fever Creations.	
Please Take My Brother Away!	Rareko	April 7, 2017	June 23, 2017	12	Based on a manhua written by Ling You. Co-produced with Imagineer.	
Deeky & Carina	Ryousuke Aoike	May 7, 2017	March 25, 2018	46	Original work.	
Dia Horizon (Hi)	Haruki Kasugamori	October 3, 2017	December 19, 2017	12	Original work.	
Please Take My Brother Away! Season 2	Rareko	July 9, 2018	December 17, 2018	24	Second season of Please Take My Brother Away!.	
Encyclopedia of Pitiful Creatures	Mariko Tokunaga	August 6, 2018	August 17, 2018	10	Based on a picture book.	
Encyclopedia of Pitiful Creatures (2019 Special)	Mariko Tokunaga	March 28, 2019	March 29, 2019	2	Additional two episodes of Encyclopedia of Pitiful Creatures.	
Encyclopedia of Pitiful Creatures (2019)	Jun Aoki	July 29, 2019	August 7, 2019	8	Additional eight episodes of Encyclopedia of Pitiful Creatures.	
Please Take My Brother Away! Season 3	Rareko	October 7, 2019	December 23, 2019	12	Third season of Please Take My Brother Away!.	
Ooya-san to Boku	Rareko	May 2, 2020	June 12, 2020	12	Based on a manga written by Tarou Yabe.	
Obake Zukan	Naomi Iwata	July 1, 2020	March 31, 2021	39	Based on a picture book.	
Please Take My Brother Away! Season 4	Rareko	August 5, 2020	October 14, 2020	12	Fourth season of Please Take My Brother Away!.	
ABCiee Working Diary	Ryousuke Aoike	January 7, 2021	March 25, 2021	12	Original work.	
Encyclopedia of Pitiful Creatures (2021)	Jun Aoki	January 31, 2021	February 28, 2021	5	Five new episodes of Encyclopedia of Pitiful Creatures released on 2021.	
Dinosaur Biyori	Akifumi Nonaka	April 4, 2021	September 26, 2021	26	Original work.	
Space Academy	Hazumu Sakuta	April 7, 2021	February 23, 2023	64	Based on a web manga written by Yuuji Nishimura.	
Ore, Tsushima	Jun Aoki	July 3, 2021	September 18, 2021	12	Based on a manga written by Opūnokyōdai.	
Chickip Dancers	Rareko	October 5, 2021	March 29, 2022	26	Based on San-X's new series of mascot characters.	
Please Take My Brother Away! Season 5	Rareko	July 29, 2022	October 14, 2022	12	Fifth season of Please Take My Brother Away!.	
Chickip Dancers Season 2	Rareko	September 27, 2022	March 28, 2023	26	Second season of Chickip Dancers.	
Tom and Jerry Play	—N/a	November 11, 2022	2023	6	Based on Tom and Jerry by William Hanna and Joseph Barbera. Co-produced with Warner Bros. Japan.	
Chickip Dancers Season 3	Rareko	September 25, 2023	March 25, 2024	26	Third season of Chickip Dancers.	
Shinobanai! CryptoNinja Sakuya	Akifumi Nonaka	October 4, 2023	March 27, 2024	25	Based on an NFT project by Ikehaya.	
Everyday Host	Rareko	April 5, 2025	September 26, 2025	24	Based on a web manga written by Nimo Gotō.	
Wanpaku! Touken Ranbu	Gaku Kinoshita	January 6, 2027	TBA	TBA	Based on a mixed-media project by Sanrio.	
Everyday Host Sequel	Rareko	January 2027	TBA	TBA	Sequel to Everyday Host.	

=== Anime films ===
Title	Director(s)	Released	Note(s)	Ref(s)
Sumikko Gurashi: Tobidasu Ehon to Himitsu no Ko	Mankyuu	November 7, 2019	Based on some fictional characters produced by San-X.	
Sumikko Gurashi Movie 2: Aoi Tsukiyo no Maho no Ko	Takahiro Omori	November 5, 2021	Based on some fictional characters produced by San-X.	
Encyclopedia of Pitiful Creatures The Movie	Yūji Uchiyama	July 8, 2022	Based on a picture book.	

=== OVAs/Specials ===
Title	Director(s)	First run start date	First run end date	Eps	Note(s)	Ref(s)
Medamayaki no Kimi Itsu Tsubusu?	Rareko	August 5, 2014	August 5, 2014	4	Based on a manga.	
English Family, Eats New Year's	Rareko	January 1, 2015	January 1, 2015	1	New year special episode.	

=== ONAs ===
Title	Director(s)	First run start date	First run end date	Eps	Note(s)	Ref(s)
Ankoku Cat	Unknown	December 19, 2006	May 13, 2008	6	Original work.	
Aggretsuko (ONA)	Rareko	April 20, 2018	April 20, 2018	10	Netflix original anime.	
Aggretsuko: We Wish You a Metal Christmas	Rareko	December 20, 2018	December 20, 2018	1	Christmas special episode.	
Aggretsuko Season 2	Rareko	June 14, 2019	June 14, 2019	10	Second season of Aggretsuko.	
Aggretsuko Season 3	Rareko	August 27, 2020	August 27, 2020	10	Third season of Aggretsuko.	
Aggretsuko Season 4	Rareko	December 16, 2021	December 16, 2021	10	Fourth season of Aggretsuko.	
Aggretsuko Season 5	Rareko	February 16, 2023	February 16, 2023	10	Fifth and final season of Aggretsuko	
