= Everyday Host =

Japanese manga series

- Cover of the first digital volume

えぶりでいホスト (Eburidei Hosuto)
- Genre: Surreal comedy
- Manga
- Written by: Nimo Gotō
- Published by: Kadokawa Shoten
- Imprint: Asuka Comics DX
- Original run: July 26, 2020 – October 27, 2022
- Volumes: 5
- Anime television series
- Directed by: Rarecho
- Written by: Rarecho
- Studio: Fanworks
- Original network: TV Tokyo, BS NTV
- Original run: April 5, 2025 – present
- Episodes: 24
- icon

Everyday Host (Japanese: えぶりでいホスト, Hepburn: Eburidei Hosuto) is a Japanese four-panel manga series written and illustrated by Nimo Gotō. Originally published online on its personal website, Pixiv, and Niconico Seiga from July 2020 to October 2022, it was later acquired by Kadokawa Shoten, which has published five digital volumes from September to December 2024 under its Asuka Comics DX imprint. A short-form anime television series adaptation produced by Fanworks aired from April to September 2025. A sequel is set to premiere in January 2027.

== Characters ==
Kōichi (コーイチ)
Voiced by: Hiro Shimono
Hajime (ハジメ)
Voiced by: Taku Yashiro
Ryōichi (リョーイチ)
Voiced by: Tasuku Hatanaka
Senichi (センイチ)
Voiced by: Nobuhiko Okamoto
Rui (ルイ)
Voiced by: Yūichirō Umehara
Shin (シン)
Voiced by: Koutaro Nishiyama
Mio (ミオ)
Voiced by: Kōhei Amasaki

== Media ==
=== Manga ===
The manga was originally published digitally in five volumes, and later released in tankōbon format.

No.	Japanese release date	Japanese ISBN
1	September 24, 2024 (digital); April 24, 2026 (print)	978-4-04-117363-3 (print)
2	October 24, 2024 (digital); April 24, 2026 (print)	978-4-04-117364-0 (print)
3	November 22, 2024 (digital); May 22, 2026 (print)	978-4-04-117365-7 (print)
4	December 24, 2024 (digital); June 24, 2026 (print)	978-4-04-117366-4 (print)
5	December 24, 2024 (digital); July 24, 2026 (print)	978-4-04-117367-1 (print)

=== Anime ===
A short-form anime television series adaptation was announced on December 17, 2024. It is produced by Fanworks, directed and written by Rarecho, and aired from April 5 to September 26, 2025, on TV Tokyo and BS NTV, running for two consecutive cours. (Note: TV Tokyo lists the series premiere on April 4, 2025, at 25:13, which is effectively April 5 at 1:13 a.m. JST.) The series' theme song is "Everyday Host", performed by EbuHosu Players (a group composed of voice actors Hiro Shimono, Taku Yashiro, Tasuku Hatanaka, and Nobuhiko Okamoto).

A sequel was announced during a fan appreciation festival event for the anime series on November 29, 2025. It is set to premiere in January 2027.
