= Anyamaru Tantei Kiruminzuu =

Japanese anime television series

- Animal Detective Kiruminzoo
- Cover art of the DVD

あにゃまる探偵 キルミンずぅ (Anyamaru Tantei Kiruminzuu)
- Created by: Shouji Kawamori; Satelight; Hal Film Maker; JM Animation
- Anime television series
- Directed by: Souichi Masui
- Written by: Eriko Matsuda; Yukio Nagasaki (Note: Under the pseudonym Yousuke Yuuki)
- Music by: Kanou Kawashima
- Studio: JM Animation; Hal Film Maker (1–11); Satelight (12–50) (Note: Credited as Animation Production Executive Producer (アニメーション制作統括) for episodes 1–11, and as Animation Production (アニメーション制作) for episodes 12–50.)
- Original network: TXN (TV Tokyo)
- Original run: October 5, 2009 – September 20, 2010
- Episodes: 50
- Manga
- Illustrated by: Kaori Hanzawa
- Published by: Shueisha
- Magazine: Ribon
- Original run: February 2010 – October 2010

Animal Detective Kiruminzoo (あにゃまる探偵 キルミンずぅ, Anyamal Tantei Kiruminzoo or Anyamaru Tantei Kiruminzuu) is a Japanese magical comedy anime series created by Shōji Kawamori; it is Kawamori's first shōjo title. The series premiered in Japan on TV Tokyo on October 5, 2009. A manga spinoff is serialized in Shueisha's shōjo magazine Ribon.

== Plot ==
Riko and Rimu Mikogami are twin sisters who live in Kamihama, a Japanese city abundant with natural wonders. On an otherwise peaceful day, while searching for a run-away cat, the two come across a mysterious Kirumin compact in an attic. With the Kirumin, these character-costume-wearing girls can transform into real animals. Their older sister Nagisa Mikogami soon joins them. Now the three have cute, funny and sometimes dangerous adventures while solving a lot of mysteries they encounter.

Kawamori's theme for the anime is: "What if you can really transform into an animal?"

== Characters ==
=== Main characters ===
- Riko Mikogami (Voiced by Aoi Yūki) is one of the two twins of the Mikogami family. She has red/orange hair, pink eyes, and loves cats. Her main Kirumin transformation is a cat, and the color she is associated with is pink. Riko is in elementary school. She is very close with Rimu and Ken Inomata. Riko is learning how to communicate with animals like her mother. She is very lively, often expending a lot of energy only to become quite tired a short time afterward. She is often shown arguing with Ken because the two are so alike, but she really does care about him. A running joke in the series is how terrible Riko is at drawing. She is very adventurous and never gives up, refusing to leave anyone who needs her help. She can be a bit egotistical, proclaiming herself as the leader of the Detective Club and occasionally referring to herself as "The Great Detective Catherine". Riko is one-quarter Animalian. This is revealed at the end of the series when she and Rimu turn into bats without Kirumin. As a cat, Riko can jump very high and has catlike agility and speed.
- Rimu Mikogami (Voiced by Satomi Satō) is the other twin sister of the Mikogami family. She has indigo hair and blue eyes, which are usually hidden behind large glasses. Rimu is in elementary school. Her main Kirumin transformation is a rabbit, and the color she is associated with is green. Tamao is shown to have a crush on her, though he never lets her know. Rimu is on her school's newspaper and loves journalism, carrying around an apple-shaped camera and a notepad all the time. Rimu is also learning how to communicate with animals. Rimu is one-quarter Animalian. This is revealed at the end of the series when she and Riko turn into bats without Kirumin. As a rabbit, Rimu has especially good hearing and becomes quite fast in Costume Mode.
- Nagisa Mikogami (Voiced by Chika Anzai) is Riko and Rimu's older sister. She has brown hair, purple eyes, and really likes dogs. Her main Kirumin transformation is a dog, and the color she is associated with is blue. Nagisa is in middle school. Her best friend is Kasumi, and she is in love with Pars. Nagisa is the older-sister-figure of the group, and always watches out for the younger ones. Nagisa is the responsible one in the group, always making sure to listen to what her mother tells them. Nagisa is also learning how to communicate with animals. She seems to be a little more informed than her sisters and given more responsibilities, such as knowing where the Kirumin were hidden after their mother confiscated them and figuring out that Doctor the turtle was actually their grandfather long before the others. Like her sisters, Nagisa is one-quarter Animalian, though her Animalian transformation is never shown. As a dog, Nagisa has really a good sense of smell and can track missing animals and people.
- Ken Inomata (Voiced by Mutsumi Tamura) is friends with Riko and Rimu. His father owns Inomata Butchers and is known for his croquettes. He has brown hair and green eyes. His main Kirumin transformation is a rat. Ken is in Riko and Rimu's elementary school class. Ken becomes involved with the Kirumins after accidentally finding one of the last two compacts in the Mikogamis' attic. There is a period of time when he is frustrated with being a rat, as rats are small and "unimpressive". After this, he cannot transform at all because of his loss of emotional connection with the animal. He can transform again after he accepts rats back into his heart. Ken is, like Riko, a little egotistical. He often proclaims himself as the leader and sometimes refers to himself as "The Great Kenlock Holmes" (a reference to Sherlock Holmes). Because both he and Riko like to be in charge, they get into arguments often, but they are also really close. He never hesitates to help when he can, and exclaims "One shot with guts!" before doing anything exciting. Ken's singing is quite atrocious, a trait that attracts Kanon Hatori (who thinks he's a bat Animalian like herself) to him. As a rat, both Ken's full transformation and Costume Mode are quite small, allowing him to fit into places the rest of them might not be able to.
- Tamao Kijima (Voiced by Kumiko Ikebe) is best friends with Ken Inomata and the son of Mayor Kijima, the mayor of Kamihama city. His main Kirumin transformation is a bird. He is the tech-savvy brainiac of the group, supplying animal identifications, communicators, and miscellaneous information and deductions. He has green hair and his eyes are never seen, instead always blocked by enormous glasses. Kanon refers to him as a "stupid onion-head". Tamao is in love with Rimu, and whenever she makes him happy or nervous, one or both of his glasses crack (depending on the extent of the emotion). His Kirumin transformation is related to various birds, although he has trouble with it in the beginning. For a while, he was the only member of the Detective Club who couldn't transform until episode 25. When Ken refers to himself as "The Great Kenlock Holmes", Tamao is called "Tamason", a reference to Dr. Watson. Tamao is a little geeky and awkward, causing Kanon to dislike him initially. She eventually accepts him as one of her friends, though.

=== Mikogami Family ===
- Haruka Mikogami (Voiced by Michiko Neya) is Riko's, Rimu's and Nagisa's mother.
- Tamotsu Mikogami (Voiced by Hideyuki Tanaka) is Riko's, Rimu's and Nagisa's father.
- Yuuki Mikogami (Voiced by Bin Shimada) is Riko's, Rimu's and Nagisa's grandfather who has been trapped in his Turtle form with an alias name, Doctor.

=== Animalians ===
Animalians are the race with the form and power of both humans and animals. They are the king of all organisms, and exist at the end of the correct evolutionary path. They can turn normal humans into Animalians by bitting them.

- Misa Hatori (Voiced by Misa Watanabe) is Kanon's mother and a Black panther Animalian.
- Kanon Hatori (Voiced by Sakura Tange) is Misa's daughter and a Bat Animalian.
- Pars Ryūdō (Voiced by Kenji Nojima) is a Wolf Animalian who Nagisa has a crush on.

==== Animalian Fang Gumi ====
Servants of Misa Hatori

- Shishiyama Shishinoshin (Voiced by Shusaku Shirakawa) is a Lion Animalian and the first leader of the group.
- Kirino Rinji (Voiced by Jun'ichi Miyake) is a Giraffe Animalian.
- Chii Hayate (Voiced by Nobunaga Shimazaki) is a Cheetah Animalian and the second leader of the group.
- Daizō Sandāsu (Voiced by Tomohisa Hashizume) is an African elephant Animalian.
- Kabaya Popota (Voiced by Hiroyuki Endo) is a Hippopotamus Animalian.
- Handa Sheishei (Voiced by Kenji Akabane) is a Giant panda Animalian.
- Arai Rakutaro (Voiced by Makoto Naruse) is a Raccoon Animalian.

=== Antagonists ===
- Kyousuke Futatsugi (Voiced by Ryōtarō Okiayu) is a former colleague of Yuuki, Haruka and Tamotsu introduced in episode 25. He is the true main antagonist of the series.

=== Others ===
- Kasumi Miyabe (Voiced by Kanako Miyamoto) is Nagisa's Kyudo partner and best friend.
- Rumiko Iwashita (Voiced by Ryō Hirohashi) is Riko's, Rimu's, Ken's, Tamao's, and Kanon's homeroom teacher.
