= Chickip Dancers =

Japanese anime television series

チキップダンサーズ (Chikippu Dansāzu)
- Genre: Slice of life
- Anime television series
- Directed by: Rareko
- Written by: Rareko; Shigenori Tanabe
- Studio: Fanworks
- Original network: NHK Educational TV
- Original run: October 5, 2021 – March 25, 2024
- Episodes: 78

Chickip Dancers (Japanese: チキップダンサーズ, Hepburn: Chikippu Dansāzu) is a Japanese anime television series produced by Fanworks, based on San-X's series of anthropomorphized food characters of the same name. The five minutes per episode show is the first terrestrial broadcast TV anime with San-X characters. It aired on NHK Educational TV from October 2021 to March 2022. A second season aired from September 2022 to March 2023, and a third season premiered aired from September 2023 to March 2024. A video game, soundtrack CD and several children's books based on the series have been released.

== Characters ==
- Chicken Bone (ほねチキン) - A bone-in chicken who is timid but also curious.
- Coach Skipping Frog (スキップガエル先生) - The group's dance teacher, a frog who is always skipping.
- Dango (だんご) - A dango (dumpling) who is like an older sister, calmly watching over everyone.
- Milky Ice (ぎゅうにゅうアイス) - A milk ice cream who is a sweet boy.
- Kushikatsu (くしかつ) - A kushikatsu (deep fried meat skewer) with a lot of allure.
- Gristle (なんこつ) - A piece of chicken cartilage yakitori who is constantly training.
- Candy Apple (りんごあめ) - A candy apple who is full of energy.

== Production and release ==
On February 12, 2021, San-X revealed the "Chickip Dancers," a new series of mascot characters that would star in an anime television series of the same name. It is a short anime, and each episode is five minutes long. This is the first terrestrial television broadcast anime with San-X characters. The series is produced by Fanworks and directed by Rareko, who is also overseeing the series' scripts alongside Shigenori Tanabe. It aired from October 5, 2021, to March 29, 2022, on NHK Educational TV. Erino Yumiki performed the opening theme "Chickip Dance".

A second season aired from September 27, 2022, to March 28, 2023, and a third season aired from September 25, 2023, to March 25, 2024.

Aside from the anime series, character goods and other media mix were also planned to be developed. A Chickip Dancers video game for Nintendo Switch was released in 2022, and a soundtrack CD was released the same year. Several Chickip Dancers children's books were published in Japan by Shogakukan.

=== Episode list ===
No.	Title	Written by (Note: Information is taken from the ending credits of each episode.)	Original release date
1	"Chicken Bone and Coach Skipping Frog"; Transliteration: "Hone Chikin to Sukippu Gaeru Sensei" (Japanese: ほねチキンとスキップガエル先生)	Shigenori Tanabe	October 5, 2021
2	"Rattling at the Lottery"; Transliteration: "Fukubiki de Garagara" (Japanese: ふくびき で ガラガラ)	Rareko	October 12, 2021
3	"Dancing to the Piano"; Transliteration: "Piano de Dansu" (Japanese: ピアノ で ダンス)	Shigenori Tanabe	October 19, 2021
4	"Scrubbing in the Bath"; Transliteration: "Ofuro de Goshigoshi" (Japanese: おふろ で ゴシゴシ)	Shigenori Tanabe	October 26, 2021
5	"Clicking with Cosmetics"; Transliteration: "Keshō de Bibibi" (Japanese: けしょう で ビビビッ)	Rareko	November 2, 2021
6	"Fussing with Radio Control"; Transliteration: "Rajikon de Buibui" (Japanese: ラジコン で ぶいぶい)	Shigenori Tanabe	November 9, 2021
7	"Squealing at the Club"; Transliteration: "Kurabu de Kyukyukyu" (Japanese: クラブ で きゅきゅきゅ)	Shigenori Tanabe	November 16, 2021
8	"Dabbling with Paint"; Transliteration: "Enogu de Petapeta" (Japanese: えのぐ で ぺたぺた)	Shigenori Tanabe	November 23, 2021
9	"Bubbling in the Pool"; Transliteration: "Pūru de Bukubuku" (Japanese: プール で ぶくぶく)	Rareko	November 30, 2021
10	"Popping Fairy"; Transliteration: "Mizu to Abura no Yōsei" (Japanese: みずとあぶらのようせい)	Rareko	December 7, 2021
11	"Tap Tap Swipe"; Transliteration: "Tappu Tappu Suwaipu" (Japanese: タップタップスワイプ)	Rareko	December 14, 2021
12	"No No Watering Can"; Transliteration: "Nō Nō Jōro" (Japanese: ノーノーじょうろ)	Shigenori Tanabe	December 21, 2021
13	"Festival Drumming"; Transliteration: "Omatsuri Dondon" (Japanese: おまつりどんどん)	Rareko	December 28, 2021
14	"Grabbing Crane"; Transliteration: "Toru Toru Kurēn" (Japanese: とるとるクレーン)	Shigenori Tanabe	January 4, 2022
15	"Clap, Clap, Clappity Clap"; Transliteration: "Panpan Papa Pan" (Japanese: パンパンパパパン)	Shigenori Tanabe	January 11, 2022
16	"It's a Library!"; Transliteration: "Toshokan Deshī!" (Japanese: としょかんでしー！)	Rareko	January 18, 2022
17	"Smooth and Shiny"; Transliteration: "Tsurutsuru Pikapika" (Japanese: つるつるぴかぴか)	Shigenori Tanabe	January 25, 2022
18	"Thick Image Change"; Transliteration: "Imechen de Mossā" (Japanese: イメチェンでもっさー)	Shigenori Tanabe	February 1, 2022
19	"Bouncing with a Jump Rope"; Transliteration: "Nawatobi de Puipui" (Japanese: なわとびでぷいぷい)	Shigenori Tanabe	February 8, 2022
20	"A Total Hide-and-Seek Shock"; Transliteration: "Kakurenbo de Tsuntaka" (Japanese: かくれんぼでツンタカ)	Shigenori Tanabe	February 15, 2022
21	"Snoring while Sleeping"; Transliteration: "Ohirune de Gorogoro" (Japanese: おひるねでゴロゴロ)	Shigenori Tanabe	February 22, 2022
22	"Footprints All Over"; Transliteration: "Ashiato Petapeta" (Japanese: あしあとペタペタ)	Shigenori Tanabe	March 1, 2022
23	"Trembling at a Ghost"; Transliteration: "Obake de Gakuburu" (Japanese: おばけでガクブル)	Shigenori Tanabe	March 8, 2022
24	"Sumo Without Delay"; Transliteration: "Sumō de Tonton" (Japanese: すもうでとんとん)	Shigenori Tanabe	March 15, 2022
25	"Shooting Up Steadily"; Transliteration: "Gungun Nyokinyoki" (Japanese: ぐんぐんニョキニョキ)	Rareko	March 22, 2022 (Note: This episode aired at 18:50 p.m. JST, an hour and 30 minutes after the original air time on NHK Educational TV.)
26	"Boneless Chicken"; Transliteration: "Hone Nashi Chikin" (Japanese: ほねなしチキン)	Shigenori Tanabe	March 29, 2022
