= Aoi Yūki =

Japanese voice actress (born 1992)

- 悠木 碧
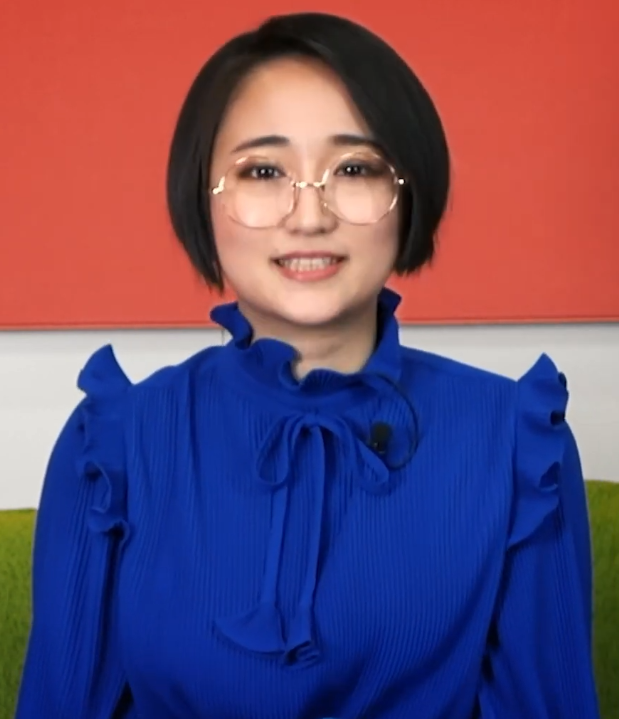
- Yūki in 2021
- Born: Aoi Yabusaki; March 27, 1992 (age 34); Sanmu, Chiba Prefecture, Japan
- Education: Waseda University
- Occupations: Actress; voice actress; singer
- Years active: 1996–present
- Agent: Aoni Production
- Height: 145 cm (4 ft 9 in)
- Musical career
- Genre: J-pop
- Instrument: Vocals
- Years active: 2012–present
- Labels: FlyingDog (2012–2016); Nippon Columbia (2017–present)
- Member of: Petit Milady
- Website: columbia.jp/yukiaoi/

Aoi Yabusaki (八武崎 碧, Yabusaki Aoi; born March 27, 1992), better known by her stage name Aoi Yūki (悠木 碧, Yūki Aoi), is a Japanese actress and singer. She voiced Nodoka Hanadera/Cure Grace in Healin' Good Pretty Cure, Madoka Kaname in Puella Magi Madoka Magica, Tsuyu Asui in My Hero Academia, Komachi Hikigaya in My Teen Romantic Comedy SNAFU, Rita Rossweisse in Honkai Impact 3rd, Tanya von Degurechaff in The Saga of Tanya the Evil, Lumine in Genshin Impact, Hibiki Tachibana in Senki Zesshou Symphogear, Diane in The Seven Deadly Sins, Tamaki Kotatsu in Fire Force, the young Murasaki Kuhōin in Kure-nai, Mami Nanami in Rent-A-Girlfriend, Kumoko/Shiraori in So I'm a Spider, So What?, Lucy in Cyberpunk: Edgerunners, Futaba Sakura in Persona 5, Sticks the Badger in Sonic Boom, Maomao in The Apothecary Diaries, and Lucy in Ninjala.

== Biography ==
Yūki was born in Chiba Prefecture. She entered the entertainment industry at the age of four. As a child, she acted in films and dramas. From 1999 to 2002, she made regular appearances on the variety shows Appare Sanma Dai-sensei and Yappari Sanma Dai-sensei which aired on Fuji TV. When she was in fifth grade, she made her debut as a voice actress.

In late 2006, she was affiliated with the theater company Central. After her admission to high school in August 2007, she joined the agency Breath, changing her stage name to Aoi Yūki. She got her first major role in 2008 in Kure-nai as Murasaki Kuhōin. In August of the same year, she moved to the agency Pro-Fit. In 2009, she starred in two anime: Anyamaru Tantei Kiruminzuu as Mikogami Riko and Yumeiro Patissiere as Amano Ichigo, respectively. After that, she voiced the female protagonists of several of her series, notably Iris from Pokémon: Best Wishes! and Victorique de Blois from Gosick.

She graduated from high school in March 2010 and university in March 2014.

In 2011, Yūki voiced Madoka Kaname in Puella Magi Madoka Magica. In October of the same year, she won the award for best voice actor in the Newtype x Machi Asobi Anime Awards. She was awarded the Best Lead Actress Award in the sixth Seiyu Awards. In 2013, Yūki and Ayana Taketatsu formed the singing unit Petit Milady. Together, they performed the song "Kagami no Dual-ism" (鏡のデュアル・イズム, The Mirror of Dual-ism), which was used as the third opening theme to the 2013 anime television series Yu-Gi-Oh! Zexal II, and in 2014, performed the song "Azurite", which was used as the opening theme for the 2014 anime series The Pilot's Love Song. She has also played Hibiki Tachibana in Symphogear and the subsequent four seasons, Yuuki Konno in Sword Art Online II, Tanya Degurechaff in The Saga of Tanya the Evil, Yoshiko Hanabatake in Aho-Girl, Nodoka Hanadera/Cure Grace in Healin' Good Pretty Cure, and Futaba Sakura in Persona 5. In 2019, she voiced Tamaki Kotatsu in Fire Force and reprised her role in its second season.

Beyond voice acting, Yūki is also a digital artist and illustrator, having created several fanworks of anime in which she has acted. She also created her own original character project "YUKI×AOI Chimera Project" in 2019 in the hopes to be greenlit for an anime adaptation.

On April 28, 2017, the official fan website AoimAniA announced that she would take a temporary break from her music career. After the closure of her website and fan club, she resumed her music activities under Nippon Columbia.

On September 20, 2023, she restarted her music activities, while she opened a limited-time Discord community called "Yōsei Yakō" (妖精夜行, Fairy Night Trip). The community's activities ended on October 31, 2024.

== Filmography ==
=== Puppet show ===
Year	Title	Role
2018–2021	Thunderbolt Fantasy	Zhao Jun Lin

=== Television animation ===
Year	Title	Role
2003	Kino's Journey	Sakura
2004	Aishiteruze Baby	Marika
2005	Onegai My Melody	Koto Yumeno
2006	Onegai My Melody: Kuru Kuru Shuffle	Koto Yumeno
2007	Onegai My Melody: Sukkiri	Koto Yumeno
2008	Kure-nai	Murasaki Kuhōin
2008	Shikabane Hime: Aka	Akira Tōoka
2009	Akikan!	Budoko
2009	Anyamaru Tantei Kiruminzuu	Riko Mikogami
2009	Nogizaka Haruka no Himitsu: Purezza	Hikari Hatsuse
2009	Shikabane Hime: Kuro	Akira Tōoka
2009	Sora no Manimani	Maibara
2009	Yumeiro Patissiere	Ichigo Amano
2009	Yutori-chan	Yutori Tanaka
2010	Dance in the Vampire Bund	Mina Tepes
2010	Durarara!!	Shinra Kishitani (young)
2010	Hyakka Ryōran Samurai Girls	Jūbei Yagyū
2010	Ichiban Ushiro no Dai Maō	Korone
2010	Jewelpet Twinkle	Amelie
2010	The World God Only Knows	Mio Aoyama
2010	Pocket Monsters: Best Wishes!	Iris
2010	Shiki	Sunako Kirishiki
2010	Sound of the Sky	Noel Kannagi
2010	Soredemo Machi wa Mawatteiru	Toshiko Tatsuno
2010	Yumeiro Patissiere Professional	Ichigo Amano
2011	A Channel	Tooru
2011	Beelzebub	Chiaki Tanimura
2011	Ben-To	Hana Oshiroi
2011	Gosick	Victorique de Blois
2011	Horizon in the Middle of Nowhere	Suzu Mukai
2011	Ikoku Meiro no Croisée	Alice Blanche
2011	Last Exile -Fam, The Silver Wing-	Giselle Collette Vingt
2011	Puella Magi Madoka Magica	Madoka Kaname
2011	Persona 4 The Animation	Aika Nakamura
2011	YuruYuri	Rivalun
2012	Daily Lives of High School Boys	Ringo-chan
2012	Dog Days	Couvert Eschenbach Pastillage
2012	Hyōka	Kurako Eba
2012	Inazuma Eleven GO vs. Danbōru Senki W	Kinako Nanobana
2012	Inazuma Eleven GO Chrono Stone	Kinako Nanobana
2012	Joshiraku	Mask
2012	Pocket Monsters: Best Wishes! Season 2	Iris
2012	Saki: Achiga-hen episode of Side-A	Shizuno Takakamo
2012	Senki Zesshō Symphogear	Hibiki Tachibana
2012	Touhou Musou Kakyou 2	Youmu Konpaku
2012	YuruYuri♪♪	Rivalun/Raika
2012	Busou Shinki	Oorbellen
2013	BlazBlue Alter Memory	Platinum the Trinity/Trinity Glassfield
2013	Gundam Build Fighters	Kirara
2013	Hyakka Ryōran Samurai Bride	Jūbei Yagyū
2013	Inazuma Eleven GO Galaxy	Konoha Morimura
2013	My Teen Romantic Comedy SNAFU	Komachi Hikigaya
2013	Pocket Monsters: Best Wishes! Season 2: Episode N	Iris
2013	Pocket Monsters: Best Wishes! Season 2: Decolora Adventure	Iris
2013	Senki Zesshō Symphogear G	Hibiki Tachibana
2013	Valvrave the Liberator	Akira Renbōkoji
2013	Hyperdimension Neptunia: The Animation	Peashy
2014	The Pilot's Love Song	Nina Viento/Claire Cruz
2014	Black Bullet	Kohina Hiruko
2014	Soul Eater Not!	Meme Tatane
2014	Free! - Eternal Summer	Sōsuke Yamazaki (young)
2014	Buddy Complex	Fiona Jyunyou Weinberg
2014	If Her Flag Breaks	Serika Gin'yūin
2014	Nobunaga Concerto	Oichi
2014	Rokujyoma no Shinryakusha!?	Korama
2014	Keroro	New Keroro, Black Star, Monaka
2014	The Seven Deadly Sins	Diane
2014	Sword Art Online II	Yuuki Konno
2014	Yu-Gi-Oh! Arc-V	Mieru Hochun
2015	Aria the Scarlet Ammo AA	Kirin Shima
2015	Case Closed	Funako Nakai
2015	Chaos Dragon	Shaddy
2015	Dog Days"	Couvert Eschenbach Pastillage
2015	Gangsta.	Nina
2015	Ketsuekigata-kun! 2	Type A-chan
2015	Ketsuekigata-kun! 3	Type A-chan
2015	My Teen Romantic Comedy SNAFU Too!	Komachi Hikigaya
2015	One-Punch Man	Tatsumaki
2015	Onsen Yōsei Hakone-chan	Goura
2015	Overlord	Clementine
2015	Rokka: Braves of the Six Flowers	Fremy Speeddraw
2015	Senki Zesshō Symphogear GX	Hibiki Tachibana
2015	Seraph of the End	Krul Tepes
2015	Tantei Kageki Milky Holmes TD	Carroll Dodgson
2015	The Asterisk War	Meeko Yanase
2015	Tokyo Ghoul √A	Kurona Yasuhisa
2015	World Break: Aria of Curse for a Holy Swordsman	Shizuno Urushibara
2015	Yamada-kun and the Seven Witches	Noa Takigawa, Maki
2015	Yo-Kai Watch	Inaho Misora
2015	Young Black Jack	Eri Imagami
2015	Yurikuma Arashi	Mitsuko Yurizono
2015	YuruYuri San☆Hai!	Rivalun/Raika
2016	Ace Attorney	Mayoi Ayasato (Maya Fey)
2016	Ange Vierge	Ramiel
2016	Divine Gate	Dorothy
2016	Endride	Mischa
2016	Erased	Kayo Hinazuki
2016	Ketsuekigata-kun! 4	Type A-chan
2016	Magic of Stella	Kayo Fujikawa
2016	My Hero Academia	Tsuyu Asui
2016	Qualidea Code	Maihime Tenkawa
2016	Ragnastrike Angels	Kasumi Barnette Midō
2016	Super Lovers	Ai Natsukawa
2016	The Seven Deadly Sins: Signs of Holy War	Diane
2016	Tanaka-kun Is Always Listless	Rino
2016	The Asterisk War 2	Meeko Yanase
2017	ACCA: 13-Territory Inspection Dept.	Lotta
2017	Aho Girl	Yoshiko Hanabatake
2017	Altair: A Record of Battles	Brigitta Grimaldi
2017	Battle Girl High School	Sadone
2017	Kino no Tabi - the Beautiful World- the Animated Series	Kino
2017	My Girlfriend Is Shobitch	Akiho Kōsaka
2017	My Hero Academia 2	Tsuyu Asui; Pony Tsunotori
2017	Sakurada Reset	Sumire Sōma
2017	Senki Zesshō Symphogear AXZ	Hibiki Tachibana
2017	Yōjo Senki: Saga of Tanya the Evil	Tanya von Degurechaff
2018	Ace Attorney Season 2	Mayoi Ayasato (Maya Fey)
2018	Asobi Asobase	Tsugumi Aozora
2018	As Miss Beelzebub Likes	Dantalion
2018	Death March to the Parallel World Rhapsody	Arisa
2018	Hakata Tonkotsu Ramens	Misaki
2018	Hakumei and Mikochi	Konju
2018	Kakuriyo: Bed and Breakfast for Spirits	Ougon Douji
2018	Karakuri Circus	Columbine
2018	Lord of Vermilion: The Crimson King	Sakiyama Koume
2018	Magical Girl Site	Ni
2018	My Hero Academia 3	Tsuyu Asui; Pony Tsunotori
2018	Persona 5: The Animation	Futaba Sakura
2018	Pop Team Epic	Popuko (Episode 2-A)
2018	Radiant	Mélie
2018	SSSS.Gridman	Borr
2018	The Master of Ragnarok & Blesser of Einherjar	Albertina
2018	The Seven Deadly Sins: Revival of the Commandments	Diane
2018	Wotakoi: Love is Hard for Otaku	Ko Sakuragi
2019	7 Seeds	Hotaru Kusakuri
2019	Boogiepop and Others	Touka Miyashita Miyashita/Boogiepop
2019	Demon Slayer: Kimetsu no Yaiba	[Black-Haired] Guide (Kiriya Ubuyashiki)
2019	Fire Force	Kotatsu Tamaki
2019	Granbelm	Suishō Hakamada
2019	Grimms Notes The Animation	Shirayuki-hime
2019	Isekai Quartet	Tanya von Degurechaff
2019	My Hero Academia 4	Tsuyu Asui
2019	One-Punch Man 2	Tatsumaki
2019	Senki Zesshō Symphogear XV	Hibiki Tachibana
2019	Teasing Master Takagi-san 2	Hōjō
2019	The Seven Deadly Sins: Wrath of the Gods	Diane
2020	Appare-Ranman!	Hototo
2020	Fate/Grand Order - Absolute Demonic Front: Babylonia	Tiamat
2020	Fire Force 2nd Season	Kotatsu Tamaki
2020	Healin' Good Pretty Cure	Nodoka Hanadera/Cure Grace, Suzuchan
2020	Infinite Dendrogram	Liliana Grandria
2020	Isekai Quartet 2	Tanya von Degurechaff
2020	My Teen Romantic Comedy SNAFU Climax	Komachi Hikigaya
2020	Our Last Crusade or the Rise of a New World	Emperor Yunmelngen
2020	Plunderer	Mizuka Sonohara
2020	Princess Connect! Re:Dive	Suzume
2020	Rent-A-Girlfriend	Mami Nanami
2021	ABCiee Working Diary	Abciee
2021	D_Cide Traumerei the Animation	Jessica Cleiborn
2021	Dragon Goes House-Hunting	Dearia (young)
2021	Farewell, My Dear Cramer	Midori Soshizaki
2021	Fena: Pirate Princess	Karin
2021	I'm Standing on a Million Lives Season 2	Aoyu
2021	I've Been Killing Slimes for 300 Years and Maxed Out My Level	Azusa Aizawa
2021	Megaton Musashi	Aoi Hoshino
2021	My Hero Academia 5	Tsuyu Asui; Pony Tsunotori; Setsuna Tokage
2021	Pokémon Master Journeys: The Series	Iris
2021	So I'm a Spider, So What?	Kumoko/Shiraori
2021	Sonny Boy	Mizuho
2021	The Faraway Paladin	Gracefeel
2021	The Seven Deadly Sins: Dragon's Judgement	Diane
2022	I'm Kodama Kawashiri	Kodama Kawajiri
2022	Mobile Suit Gundam: The Witch from Mercury	Norea Du Noc
2022	Motto! Majime ni Fumajime Kaiketsu Zorori Season 3	Mira
2022	My Hero Academia 6	Tsuyu Asui; Setsuna Tokage
2022	Ninjala	Lucy
2022	Rent-A-Girlfriend Season 2	Mami Nanami
2022	Requiem of the Rose King	Joan of Arc
2022	Shinobi no Ittoki	Kirei Kisegawa
2022	Teasing Master Takagi-san 3	Hōjō
2022	Uncle from Another World	Mabel Laybelle
2023	A Herbivorous Dragon of 5,000 Years Gets Unfairly Villainized	Reiko (Japanese dub)
2023	Bleach: Thousand-Year Blood War	Liltotto Lamperd
2023	In/Spectre 2nd Season	Yuki-Onna
2023	KamiErabi God.app	Ryō
2023	KamiKatsu	Ataru
2023	Nier: Automata Ver1.1a	Pascal
2023	Spy Classroom	Monika
2023	The Apothecary Diaries	Maomao
2023	The Vexations of a Shut-In Vampire Princess	Prohelia Zutazutsky
2023	Undead Unluck	Gina
2023	Urusei Yatsura	Ten
2024	How I Attended an All-Guy's Mixer	Fuji
2024	Ishura	Kia the World Word
2024	Mechanical Arms	Fubuki
2024	Mission: Yozakura Family	Shion Yozakura
2024	My Hero Academia 7	Tsuyu Asui
2024	Nights with a Cat Season 3	Chikuwa, Konbu
2024	No Longer Allowed in Another World	Warderia
2024	Ranma ½	Azusa Shiratori
2024	Re:Zero 3rd Season	Capella Emerada Lugunica
2024	Sasaki and Peeps	Pii-chan
2024	The Elusive Samurai	Kazama Genba
2024	The Misfit of Demon King Academy 2nd Season	Militia
2024	TsumaSho	Takae Niijima/Marika Shiraishi
2025	Clevatess	Neruru
2025	Gnosia	Yuriko
2025	Kaijū Sekai Seifuku	Kaijū Mera, Gusuka, Aniki, Sugar
2025	My Hero Academia: Final Season	Tsuyu Asui; Pony Tsunotori; Setsuna Tokage
2025	One-Punch Man 3	Tatsumaki
2025	The Apothecary Diaries Season 2	Maomao
2026	Magical Girl Raising Project: Restart	Lapis Lazuline
2026	Sirotan	Sirotan
2026	Yōjo Senki: Saga of Tanya the Evil II	Tanya von Degurechaff
2026	The Apothecary Diaries (season 3, part 1)	Maomao
2027	Inherit the Winds	Hyōgo Koganei
2027	The Apothecary Diaries (season 3, part 2)	Maomao
2027	Shōzen	Kensei

=== Original video animation (OVA) ===
Year	Title	Role
2009	Akikan!	Budoko
2011	Baby Princess	Mari Amatsuka
2016	The Kubikiri Cycle	Tomo Kunagisa

=== Original net animation (ONA) ===
Year	Title	Role
2020	Cagaster of an Insect Cage	Kara
2020	Obsolete	Konoka Kokonoha
2021	The Heike Story	Biwa
2022	Cyberpunk: Edgerunners	Lucy
2023	Good Night World	Pico
2026	Yu-Gi-Oh! Card Game The Chronicles	Verre (Rilliona)

=== Theatrical animation ===
Year	Title	Role
2011	Pocket Monsters Best Wishes! the Movie - Victini and the Black Hero: Zekrom	Iris
2011	Pocket Monsters Best Wishes! the Movie - Victini and the White Hero: Reshiram	Iris
2012	Pocket Monsters Best Wishes! the Movie - Kyurem VS the Sacred Swordsman: Keldeo	Iris
2013	Pocket Monsters Best Wishes! the Movie - ExtremeSpeed Genesect: Mewtwo Awakens	Iris
2013	Puella Magi Madoka Magica the Movie: Rebellion	Madoka Kaname
2015	Appleseed Alpha	Iris
2015	Yo-Kai Watch: Enma Daiō to Itsutsu no Monogatari da Nyan!	Inaho Misora
2016	Your Name	Sayaka Natori
2016	A Silent Voice	Yuzuru Nishimiya
2017	The Night Is Short, Walk on Girl	Princess Daruma
2017	Fairy Tail: Dragon Cry	Sonya
2017	KiraKira☆PreCure à la Mode: Crisply! The Memory of Mille-feuille!	Cook
2018	Doraemon the Movie: Nobita's Treasure Island	Quiz
2018	The Seven Deadly Sins the Movie: Prisoners of the Sky	Diane
2018	My Tyrano: Together, Forever	Top
2018	My Hero Academia: Two Heroes	Tsuyu Asui
2018	Monster Strike the Movie: Sora no Kanata	Yūna
2019	Even if the World Will End Tomorrow	Miko
2019	Saga of Tanya the Evil: The Movie	Tanya von Degurechaff
2019	Violence Voyager	Bobby
2019	Crayon Shin-chan: Honeymoon Hurricane ~The Lost Hiroshi~	The princess
2019	Weathering with You	Sayaka Natori
2019	Violet Evergarden: Eternity and the Auto Memory Doll	Taylor Bartlett
2019	My Hero Academia: Heroes Rising	Tsuyu Asui
2020	Pretty Cure Miracle Leap	Nodoka Hanadera/Cure Grace
2020	Healin' Good Pretty Cure: GoGo! Big Transformation! The Town of Dreams	Nodoka Hanadera/Cure Grace
2021	The Seven Deadly Sins: Cursed by Light	Diane
2021	My Hero Academia: World Heroes' Mission	Tsuyu Asui
2022	Crayon Shin-chan: Mononoke Ninja Chinpūden	Elder's Secretary
2022	Idol Bu Show	Shinobu Sakuma
2022	Teasing Master Takagi-san: The Movie	Hōjō
2022	Break of Dawn	Nanako
2022	Delicious Party Pretty Cure: Children's Lunch Only For Me	Cure Grace
2022	The Seven Deadly Sins: Grudge of Edinburgh	Diane
2023	Gridman Universe	Borr
2023	Pretty Cure All-Stars F	Nodoka Hanadera/Cure Grace
2024	Ōmuro-ke	Miho Yaeno
2024	Kuramerukagari	Ameya
2024	Mononoke the Movie: Phantom in the Rain	Kame
2024	My Hero Academia: You're Next	Tsuyu Asui
2024	The Colors Within	Shiho Nanakubo
2025	100 Meters	Komiya (young)
2026	The Apothecary Diaries: The Late Lady's Treasure	Maomao
2027	Doraemon: Nobita's Steam-Powered Time Machine	Lily

=== Video games ===
Year	Title	Role	Notes	System
2003	Kino's Journey	Sakura		PlayStation 2
2006	Blazing Souls Accelate	Lydia		PlayStation 2, Xbox 360, PlayStation Portable, Android, iOS
2006	Granado Espada	Ludin Von Hanen		Microsoft Windows
2009	BlazBlue: Continuum Shift	Platinum the Trinity		Arcade, PlayStation 3, Xbox 360, Windows
2012	BlazBlue: Chrono Phantasma	Platinum the Trinity, Trinity Glassfille		Arcade, PlayStation 3, PlayStation Vita, Microsoft Windows
2012	Do-Don-Pachi Saidaioujou	Hibachi, Inbachi		Arcade, Xbox 360
2012	Hyperdimension Neptunia Victory	Peashy/Yellow Heart		PlayStation 3, PlayStation Vita, Microsoft Windows
2012	Phantasy Star Online 2	Clariskrays		Microsoft Windows, PlayStation Vita, iOS, Android, PlayStation 4
2012	Professor Layton vs. Phoenix Wright: Ace Attorney	Mahoney Katalucia		Nintendo 3DS
2012	Puella Magi Madoka Magica Portable	Madoka Kaname		PlayStation Portable
2012	Rune Factory 4	Margaret		Nintendo 3DS
2012	Toki to Towa	Enda		PlayStation 3
2012	Sol Trigger	Cyril		PlayStation Portable
2013	Fate/Extra CCC	Jinako Karigiri		PlayStation Portable
2013	God Eater 2	Dr. Rachel Claudius		PlayStation Portable, PlayStation Vita
2013	Puella Magi Madoka Magica: The Battle Pentagram	Madoka Kaname		PlayStation Vita
2013	Kamen Rider: Battride War	Reito		PlayStation 3
2014	Super Heroine Chronicle	Hibiki Tachibana		PlayStation Vita, PlayStation 3
2014	Granblue Fantasy	Anila, Mina Levin, Mona Levin, Mena Levin		Browser game, iOS, Android
2014	Sword Art Online: Hollow Fragment	Yuuki		PlayStation Vita, PlayStation 4
2014	Sonic Boom: Rise of Lyric	Sticks the Badger		Wii U
2014	Sonic Boom: Shattered Crystal	Sticks the Badger		Nintendo 3DS
2015	BlazBlue: Central Fiction	Platinum the Trinity, Trinity Glassfille		PlayStation 3, PlayStation 4, Arcade
2015	Closers	Mikoto Amamiya		Windows
2015	Battle Girl High School	Sadone		iOS, Android
2015	Dengeki Bunko: Fighting Climax Ignition	Yuuki		Arcade, PlayStation 3, PlayStation 4, PlayStation Vita
2015	Resident Evil: Revelations 2	Natalia Korda		Microsoft Windows, PlayStation 3, PlayStation 4, PlayStation Vita, Xbox 360, Xbox One
2015	Sword Art Online: Lost Song	Yuuki		PlayStation 3, PlayStation Vita, PlayStation 4
2015	Fate/Grand Order	Okita Souji		iOS, Android
2016	Dragon Quest Heroes II	Maribel		PlayStation 4, PlayStation 3, PlayStation Vita
2016	Gundam Breaker 3	Info-chan		PlayStation 4, PlayStation Vita
2016	Mario & Sonic at the Rio 2016 Olympic Games	Sticks the Badger		Wii U
2016	Persona 5	Futaba Sakura, Necronomicon (Persona awakening voice)/Shadow Futaba		PlayStation 3, PlayStation 4
2016	Alternative Girls	Mero		iOS, Android
2016	Fate/Grand Order	Shuten Douji, Beast II/Tiamat		iOS, Android
2016	Sonic Boom: Fire & Ice	Sticks the Badger		3DS
2017	Nier: Automata	Pascal		PlayStation 4, Microsoft Windows
2017	Onmyōji	Kochō-no-sei, Chōchin-kozō		iOS, Android
2017	Puella Magi Madoka Magica Side Story: Magia Record	Madoka Kaname		iOS, Android
2017	Street Fighter V	Menat		Microsoft Windows, PlayStation 4
2017	Xenoblade Chronicles 2	Finch/Ibuki		Nintendo Switch
2017	Super Bomberman R	Pink Bomberman		Nintendo Switch
2017	Sonic Forces	Avatar (Female)		PC, Xbox One, PS4, Nintendo Switch
2017	Honkai Impact 3	Rita Rossweisse	Japanese dub	iOS, Android
2017	Girls' Frontline	M1918		iOS, Android
2018	Ys VIII: Lacrimosa of Dana	Io		PlayStation 4, Microsoft Windows
2018	Sword Art Online: Fatal Bullet	Yuuki		PlayStation Vita, PlayStation 4, Microsoft Windows
2018	Sdorica	Tica Chevalier, Tica SP		iOS, Android
2018	My Hero: One's Justice	Tsuyu Asui		Microsoft Windows, PlayStation 4, Nintendo Switch, Xbox One
2018	Fate/Grand Order	Okita Souji (Alter), Shuten Douji (Caster)		iOS, Android
2018	Azur Lane	Japanese aircraft carrier Taihō		iOS, Android
2018	The Legend of Heroes: Sen no Kiseki IV -The End of Saga	Renne Bright		PlayStation 4
2018	Pokémon: Let's Go, Pikachu! and Let's Go, Eevee!	Eevee		Nintendo Switch
2018	Princess Connect! Re:Dive	Suzume		iOS, Android, DMM Player
2019	Persona 5 Royal	Futaba Sakura		PlayStation 4
2019	Super Smash Bros. Ultimate	Futaba Sakura	DLC	Nintendo Switch
2019	Fire Emblem: Three Houses	Lysithea		Nintendo Switch
2019	Fate/Grand Order	Ganesha, Okita Souji		iOS, Android
2019	Epic Seven	Ravi		iOS, Android
2019	Arknights	Истина (Istina), Earthspirit, Nian		iOS, Android
2019	Release the Spyce: Secret Fragrance	Yura Ranjishi		iOS, Android
2019	Pokémon Sword and Shield	Eevee		Nintendo Switch
2019	Scarlet Nexus	Kodama Melone	Japanese dub	PlayStation 5, PlayStation 4, Microsoft Windows, Xbox One, Xbox Series X/S
2020	Genshin Impact	Traveler (female; Lumine)		PlayStation 4, Microsoft Windows, iOS, Android
2020	Guardian Tales	Grand Admiral Marina		iOS, Android
2020	Fate/Grand Order	Ibuki Dōji		iOS, Android
2020	The Legend of Heroes: Trails into Reverie	Renne Bright		PlayStation 4
2020	Illusion Connect	Charlotte		iOS, Android
2021	Another Eden	Melissa		iOS, Android
2021	The King of Fighters All Star	Diane		iOS, Android
2021	NieR Replicant ver.1.22474487139...	Louise		Microsoft Windows, PlayStation 4, Xbox One
2021	Alchemy Stars	Uriel, Mia		iOS, Android
2021	Cookie Run: Kingdom	Cherry Cookie		iOS, Android
2021	Pokémon Brilliant Diamond and Shining Pearl	Eevee		Nintendo Switch
2021	Counter:Side	Amy Strickland/Amy Firstwing		iOS, Android, Microsoft Windows
2021	The Legend of Heroes: Kuro no Kiseki	Renne Bright		PlayStation 4
2021	Gate of Nightmares	Elena-Maria, Marro		iOS, Android
2021	Gran Saga	Quyi		iOS, Android, Microsoft Windows
2022	Atelier Sophie 2: The Alchemist of the Mysterious Dream	Alette Claretie		PlayStation 4, Nintendo Switch, Microsoft Windows
2022	Sin Chronicle	Sera, Chloe		iOS, Android
2022	Koumajou Remilia: Scarlet Symphony	Cirno		Nintendo Switch, Microsoft Windows
2022	Xenoblade Chronicles 3	Fiona		Nintendo Switch
2022	The Legend of Heroes: Trails Through Daybreak II	Renne Bright		PlayStation 4, PlayStation 5
2023	404 Game Re:set	Virtua Cop		iOS, Android
2023	Granblue Fantasy Versus: Rising	Anila		PlayStation 4, PlayStation 5, Microsoft Windows
2023	Fate/Grand Order	Larva / Tiamat		iOS, Android
2023	Persona 5 Tactica	Futaba Sakura		PlayStation 5, PlayStation 4, Microsoft Windows, Xbox One, Xbox Series X/S, Nintendo Switch
2024	Puyo Puyo Quest	Madoka Kaname, Ultimate Madoka	Event	Android, iOS, Kindle Fire
2024	Reverse Collapse: Code Name Bakery	Sugar		Microsoft Windows
2024	Fate/Samurai Remnant	Ibuki Douji (Rogue Ruler)	DLC	PlayStation 4, PlayStation 5, Nintendo Switch, Steam
2024	Final Fantasy XIV: Dawntrail	Calyx		PlayStation 4, PlayStation 5, macOS, Microsoft Windows, Xbox Series X/S
2025	Shuten Order	Himeru/Himeno		Nintendo Switch, Steam
2025	Guilty Gear Strive	Lucy	Guest DLC	PlayStation 4, PlayStation 5, Steam, Xbox One, Xbox Series X/S, Nintendo Switch
2025	Duet Night Abyss	Rebecca.	JP voice-over	iOS, Android, Microsoft Windows
2026	Crystal of Atlan	Jodie (Inventor/Empirica/Rhapsodia classes)	JP voice-over	PlayStation 5, Steam, Microsoft Windows, iOS, Android
2026	Wuthering Waves	Lucy	JP voice-over	PlayStation 5, Steam, Microsoft Windows, iOS, Android, Mac, Xbox Series X/S
2026	Punishing: Gray Raven	Leia	JP voice-over	Steam, Microsoft Windows, iOS, Android
2027	The Apothecary Diaries: The False Imperial Brother	Maomao		PlayStation 5, Nintendo Switch, Nintendo Switch 2, Steam

=== Drama CDs ===
- Arpeggio of Blue Steel, Iona, I-400, I-402
- Fate/GUDAGUDA Order, Okita Souji
- Himawari-san, Ami Minami
- My Sweet Tyrant, Non Katagiri.
- Taiyō no Ie, Mao Motomiya
- Sacrificial Princess and the King of Beasts, Saliphie
- Vampire Knight Memories, Kiryu Ren

=== Live action ===
Year	Title	Role	Other notes
1998	Seijuu Sentai Gingaman	Girl	Episode 19
2001	Hyakujuu Sentai Gaoranger	Miho	Episode 41
2003	Kamen Rider 555	Mari Sonoda (young)	Episode 9
2008	Cafe Isobe	Kana	Film
2015	Kamen Rider Drive	Yurusen	Episode 48, voice role
2015	Kamen Rider Ghost	Yurusen	Voice role
2016	Doubutsu Sentai Zyuohger	Yurusen	Episode 7, voice role
2017	Final Fantasy XIV: Dad of Light	Kirin	Voice role
2019	Brave Father Online: Our Story of Final Fantasy XIV	Kirin	Voice role

=== Dubbing roles ===
Live-action

Year	Title	Role	Voice dub for	Other notes
2018	Tomb Raider	young Lara Croft	Maisy De Freitas and Emily Carey	
2019	Bumblebee	Shatter	Angela Bassett	
2020	A Dog's Way Home	Bella	Bryce Dallas Howard	
2021	The Suicide Squad	Ratcatcher 2	Daniela Melchior	
2022	Moonshot	Sophie Tsukino	Lana Condor	
2022	The Guardians of the Galaxy Holiday Special	Cosmo the Spacedog	Maria Bakalova	
2023	Guardians of the Galaxy Vol. 3	Cosmo the Spacedog	Maria Bakalova	
2024	The Wrath of Becky	Becky	Lulu Wilson	
2024	Venom: The Last Dance	Leaf Moon	Dash McCloud	
2024	Sonic the Hedgehog 3	Maria Robotnik	Alyla Browne	
2024	Mufasa: The Lion King	Akua	Joanna Jones	

Animation

Year	Title	Role	Other notes
2017	Sonic Boom	Sticks the Badger	
2018	Spider-Man: Into the Spider-Verse	Gwen Stacy / Spider-Woman	
2019	Transformers: Cyberverse	Windblade	
2021	Playmobil: The Movie	Marla Brenner	
2021	White Snake	Precious Jade Workshop Foxy Boss	
2021	The Boss Baby: Family Business	Little Bo Peep	
2023	Spider-Man: Across the Spider-Verse	Gwen Stacy / Spider-Woman	

=== Others ===
Year	Title	Role	Other notes
2021	Project:;Cold	Iori Heartfield	

== Discography ==
=== Studio albums ===
Title	Album details	Peak chart positions	Sales
Title	Album details	JPN	Sales
Ismael	Released: February 11, 2015; Label: FlyingDog; Formats: CD+DVD, CD, digital download, streaming	14	JPN: 6,000
Voice Sample	Released: June 12, 2019; Label: Nippon Columbia; Formats: CD+Blu-ray disc, CD, digital download, streaming	8	JPN: 7,000

=== Extended plays ===
Title	Album details	Peak chart positions	Sales
Title	Album details	JPN	Sales
Petitpa	Released: March 28, 2012; Label: FlyingDog; Formats: CD+DVD, CD, digital download, streaming	14	JPN: 8,000
Meriba	Released: February 13, 2013; Label: FlyingDog; Formats: CD+DVD, CD, digital download, streaming	18	JPN: 6,000
Tokowaka no Kuni	Released: December 14, 2016; Label: FlyingDog; Formats: CD+DVD, CD, digital download, streaming	27	JPN: 4,000
Yoseiyako	Released: October 1, 2024; Label: Nippon Columbia; Formats: CD+Blu-ray disc, digital download, streaming	— (Note: Yoseiyako did not enter the Oricon Albums Chart, but peaked at number 50 on the Digital Albums Chart.)	

=== Singles ===
Year	Title	Peak chart positions		Album
Year	Title	JPN	JPN Hot 100	Album
2014	"Bijumania"	19	73	Ismael
2014	"Cupidreview"	18	43	Ismael
2017	"Eien Labyrinth"	12	64	Voice Sample
2018	"Kaeru Basho ga Aru to Iu Koto"	18	—	Voice Sample
2020	"Unbreakable"	14	76	TBA
2021	"Guwafuda Everyday"	18	—	TBA
"—" denotes a recording that did not chart or was not released in that territory.

== Awards ==
Year	Award ceremony	Award	Result
2011	1st Newtype Anime Awards	Best Actress	Won
2012	6th Seiyu Awards	Best Actress	Won
2018	4th Anime Trending Awards	Best Voice Actress	Won
2020	6th Anime Trending Awards	Best Voice Actress	Won
2021	43rd Anime Grand Prix	Best Voice Actor	Won
2025	47th Anime Grand Prix	Best Voice Actor	Won
2025	9th Crunchyroll Anime Awards	Best VA Performance (Japanese)	Won
2026	10th Crunchyroll Anime Awards	Best VA Performance (Japanese)	Won
