= Oshi no Ko (TV series) =

Japanese anime television series

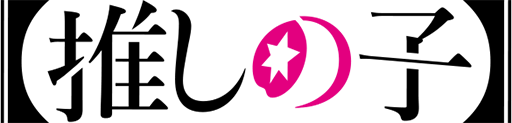
- 【推しの子】
- Genre: Drama; Mystery; Supernatural
- Based on: Oshi no Ko by Aka Akasaka (Note: Author) and Mengo Yokoyari (Note: Illustrator)
- Developed by: Jin Tanaka
- Directed by: Daisuke Hiramaki
- Voices of: Takeo Ōtsuka; Yurie Igoma; Rie Takahashi; Megumi Han; Manaka Iwami; Rumi Okubo
- Music by: Takurō Iga
- Country of origin: Japan
- Original language: Japanese
- No. of seasons: 3
- No. of episodes: 35 (list of episodes)

Production
- Producers: Takuya Yoshioka; Shinpei Yamashita; Hajime Kamata (S1–2); Yōsuke Aomura (S1–2); Hiroki Okagawa (S2–3); Genki Negishi (S1); Shingo Saitō (S3); Manami Kabashima (S3)
- Cinematography: Takafumi Kuwano
- Animator: Doga Kobo (Note: Main Animators: Asami Hayakawa, Kimiaki Mizuno & Ayaka Muroga (S1–2); Honoka Yokoyama & Takeshi Osame (S1); Kenji Sawada (S1/3))
- Editor: Kentarō Tsubone
- Running time: 23–26 minutes; 81 minutes (#1); 53 minutes (#35)
- Production companies: Kadokawa; Shueisha; Doga Kobo; CyberAgent

Original release
- Network: Tokyo MX
- Release: April 12, 2023 – present

Oshi no Ko (【推しの子】) (Note: Interpreted as "My Favorite Idol's Children") is a Japanese anime television series produced by Doga Kobo, based on the manga series Oshi no Ko written by Aka Akasaka and illustrated by Mengo Yokoyari. It follows a doctor and his recently deceased patient who were reborn as twins to a famous Japanese pop idol, as they navigate the highs and lows of the country's entertainment industry while growing up together. The anime series premiered in April 2023 with a feature-length first episode. As of March 2026, it has aired three seasons. A fourth and final season has been announced.

The series quickly gained critical and commercial success, with critics praising its storytelling, animation quality, thematic boldness, portrayal of idol culture, media exploitation, and parasocial relationships. It has won numerous awards, including Animation of the Year at the Tokyo Anime Award Festival.

== Plot ==
=== Premise ===
Gorou Amamiya is a gynecologist working in a rural area and a fan of the idol Ai Hoshino, a member of girl group B-Komachi. While preparing to assist Ai during her secret pregnancy, Gorou is murdered shortly before she gives birth. He is subsequently reincarnated as one of Ai's twin children, Aquamarine "Aqua" Hoshino, retaining memories of his previous life. The other twin, Ruby Hoshino, is revealed to be the reincarnation of Sarina Tendōji, a former patient of Gorou who had been terminally ill and had expressed a desire to become an idol.

Ai raises Aqua and Ruby while concealing their identities from the public and continuing her career as an idol. Several years later, Ai is murdered by a stalker who obtained her home address through leaked information. Aqua witnesses the incident and later determines that the stalker had received guidance from another individual connected to Ai. Aqua suspects that this person is his biological father and decides to investigate the circumstances surrounding Ai's death.

As Aqua and Ruby grow older, they enter the entertainment industry through different paths. Aqua becomes involved in acting and media productions to obtain information related to Ai's past, while Ruby pursues an idol career inspired by her mother. Their activities bring them into contact with various professionals and organizations within the industry as Aqua continues his investigation.

=== Season 1 ===
Ai Hoshino secretly gives birth to twins, Aquamarine and Ruby Hoshino, while maintaining her public image as an idol. The twins grow up under her care, hiding their reincarnated identities. Several years later, Ai is murdered by a stalker who had obtained her personal information. Aqua witnesses the incident and later begins investigating the people connected to Ai before her death, suspecting his biological father to be behind the murder.

As teenagers, Aqua and Ruby begin participating in entertainment-related activities. Ruby aims to become an idol, while Aqua accepts acting roles to gain access to individuals associated with Ai's career. He appears in various productions, beginning with a TV adaptation of the manga "Sweet Today", where he meets Kana Arima, a former star child actor. This is followed by a reality dating show in which he meets Akane Kurokawa, a talented actress who faces a massive controversy during the show, and MeM-cho, whom he later introduces to Ruby. The reality show ends with Aqua and Akane as the star couple, having overcome the controversy, and, believing he can make use of Akane's brilliant analytical abilities, Aqua enters a fake relationship with Akane.

Meanwhile, Ruby forms a new version of the idol group B-Komachi under Strawberry Productions. She recruits Kana Arima and later MeM-cho as members. They decide on Kana as center performer, and are offered an opportunity to perform at the Japan Idol Festival by a producer Aqua had previously worked with. Their debut goes well, and they begin to attract attention, especially from fans of the old B-Komachi.

=== Season 2 ===
Aqua, Akane, and Kana are cast in a stage adaptation of the manga "Tokyo Blade", alongside several other actors such as Melt Narushima who played in the "Sweet Today" adaptation and the star actor Taiki Himekawa from the same theater group as Akane. Rehearsals highlight differences in acting styles, experience levels, and approaches to performance.

As production progresses, the author of the source material takes issue with the script, and the play is delayed as they reconcile the issues with the help of Yoriko Kichijouji, the author of the "Sweet Today" manga. The reworked script is very ambitious, putting more pressure on the cast. A particular scene triggers Aqua's PTSD, and, after supporting him, Akane learns of his mission for revenge.

During the performance of the play, several important character moments are highlighted. These include: Melt's desire to improve from his formerly bad acting skills, the rivalry between Akane and Kana which dates back to their childhood, Kana's hesitance to take the spotlight, and Aqua's complicated relationship with acting.

Shortly after, Aqua learns from a DNA test that the star of the play, Taiki Himekawa, is his half brother. He confronts Taiki, who tells him that his biological father died many years ago in a murder-suicide. Aqua, shocked by this information, feels freed from revenge, and resolves to live his own life. This involves sorting out his relationships with Kana and Akane, both of whom express interest in him. When discussing his future with Akane she realizes a loophole in the DNA test evidence, and suspects that Aqua's true biological father is in fact still alive, although she hides this from him.

After the play's run is complete, B-Komachi is scheduled to travel to Aqua and Ruby's hometown to film a music video, and Aqua and Akane are invited to come along. While there, Ruby discovers the corpse of Gorou Amamiya, who she loved in her past life, and spirals into despair. Meanwhile, Aqua decides to start truly dating Akane.

=== Season 3 ===
The cast continues pursuing their careers within the entertainment industry, growing in popularity. In the case of Ruby, now motivated by revenge, this comes at the expense of her values. Aqua, guided by concern, finds her secret advisor, Ichigo Saitou, the former manager of Strawberry productions. He explains that Ai's killer is already dead, but Ichigo points out crucial flaws in the information, challenging Aqua's new peaceful life.

Meanwhile, Kana, who lacks energy and motivation after being rejected by Aqua, pursues a new source of work by getting close to an up-and-coming director who expresses interest in casting her. But, although innocent, tabloid capture photos of her entering and leaving his apartment, threatening her career. The publication is prevented by Aqua, who offers a bigger story in exchange. He exposes the truth about Ai and her children, which leads to him cutting ties with Ruby and Akane, and recommitting fully to revenge.

As a means to this goal, him and his mentor, Director Gotanda, start work on a film exploring Ai's story: "The Fifteen Year Lie". The casting process brings all the main characters together, including Akane, who's determined to stop Aqua, and the members of B-Komachi, who, with the exception of Kana, lack acting experience. The role is the final straw for Ruby, who, overworked, depressed, and alone, starts to break down. Aqua, who realizes her past life identity, reveals his own to her, and realizing her beloved doctor was by her side the whole time gives Ruby the strength to go on and be true to herself.

Aqua also orchestrates the return of Ichigo to their production agency, which alleviates much needed stress just in time for them to take on the massive project of the film. And, needing child actors, he invites a mysterious girl who seems to know the nature of their reincarnation to join the production.

== Series overview ==
Season	Episodes	Originally released	
Season	Episodes	First released	Last released
1	11	April 12, 2023	June 28, 2023
2	13	July 3, 2024	October 6, 2024
3	11	January 14, 2026	March 25, 2026

== Cast and characters ==
Character	Japanese	English
Aquamarine Hoshino (星野 愛久愛海, Hoshino Akuamarin) / Aqua (アクア, Akua); Gorou Amamiya (雨宮 吾郎, Amamiya Gorō)	Takeo Ōtsuka (Aqua, teen); Yumi Uchiyama (Aqua, child); Kent Itō (Gorou)	Jack Stansbury (Aqua, teen); Chaney Moore (Aqua, child); Jeremy Gee (Gorou)
Ruby Hoshino (星野 瑠美衣, Hoshino Rubii); Sarina Tendōji (天童寺 さりな, Tendōji Sarina)	Yurie Igoma (Ruby); Tomoyo Takayanagi (Sarina)	Alyssa Marek (Ruby); Savanna Menzel (Sarina)
Kana Arima (有馬 かな, Arima Kana)	Megumi Han	Natalie Rial
Akane Kurokawa (黒川 あかね, Kurokawa Akane)	Manaka Iwami	Kristen McGuire
Ai Hoshino (星野 アイ, Hoshino Ai)	Rie Takahashi	Donna Bella Litton
Ichigo Saitō (斎藤 壱護, Saitō Ichigo)	Hisao Egawa	Brandon Hearnsberger
Miyako Saitō (斎藤 ミヤコ, Saitō Miyako)	Lynn	Christina Kelly
MEM-cho (MEMちょ)	Rumi Okubo	Juliet Simmons
Hikaru Kamiki (神木 輝, Kamiki Hikaru)	Mamoru Miyano	Austin Tindle
Taishi Gotanda (五反田 泰志, Gotanda Taishi)	Yasuyuki Kase	Ty Mahany
Masaya Kaburagi (鏑木 勝也, Kaburagi Masaya)	Masaki Terasoma	Justin Doran
Frill Shiranui (不知火 フリル, Shiranui Furiru)	Asami Seto	Annie Wild
Minami Kotobuki (東堂 葵, Kotobuki Minami)	Hina Yōmiya	Brittany Lauda
Pieyon (ぴえヨン)	Taishi Murata	Andrew Love
Yoriko Kichijouji (吉祥寺 頼子, Kichijōji Yoriko)	Shizuka Itō	Kelly Greenshield
Abiko Samejima (鮫島 アビ子, Samejima Abiko)	Ayane Sakura	Jad Saxton
Sumiaki Raida (雷田 澄彰, Raida Sumiaki)	Kenichi Suzumura	Alejandro Saab
GOA	Daisuke Ono	Dylan Godwin
Taiki Himekawa (姫川 大輝, Himekawa Taiki)	Koki Uchiyama	Daman Mills
Melt Narushima (鳴嶋 メルト, Narushima Meruto)	Seiji Maeda	Bryson Baugus
Ryosuke Sugano (菅野 良介, Sugano Ryosuke)	Atsushi Tamaru	Gabriel Regojo
Tsukuyomi (ツクヨミ)	Hina Kino	Luci Christian

== Release ==
An anime adaptation was announced in June 2022. The anime, later revealed to be a television series, was produced by Doga Kobo and directed by Daisuke Hiramaki, with Chao Nekotomi serving as assistant director, Jin Tanaka writing the scripts, and Kanna Hirayama handling the character designs. It aired from April 12 to June 28, 2023, on Tokyo MX and other networks. The 90-minute first episode, "Mother and Children", also premiered at selected theaters in Japan on March 17 of the same year.

A second season was announced after the airing of the eleventh episode of the first season. It aired from July 3 to October 6, 2024.

A third season was announced after the airing of the thirteenth episode of the second season. The season premiered on January 14, 2026. It ended with a one-hour special, which aired on March 25 of the same year.

A fourth and final season was announced after the airing of the eleventh episode of the third season.

=== International release ===
The series is licensed by Sentai Filmworks and has been available for streaming on Hidive. An English dub premiered on May 24, 2023. The first season was released on Blu-ray on June 25, 2024. The second season was released on January 6, 2026. Medialink licensed the series in Asia-Pacific and streamed it on the Ani-One Asia YouTube channel. It premiered on Animax Asia on October 30, 2024. Crunchyroll is streaming the third season along with Hidive. On February 25, 2026, Crunchyroll announced that it had acquired the streaming rights for the first two seasons of the series in collaboration with Hidive. The first season was made available immediately, while the second season was added a month later on March 25, 2026.

== Music ==
The music for the series was composed by Takurō Iga. The original soundtrack album for the first season was released on September 27, 2023. The original soundtrack album for the second season was released on October 9, 2024. The original soundtrack album for the third season was released on April 8, 2026.

The opening theme for the first season is "Idol" (アイドル, Aidoru), performed by Yoasobi, and the ending theme is "Mephisto" (メフィスト, Mefisuto), performed by Queen Bee. The opening theme for the second season is "Fatal" (ファタール, Fatāru), performed by Gemn (composed of Tatsuya Kitani and Kento Nakajima), and the ending theme is "Burning", performed by Hitsujibungaku. The opening theme for the third season is "Test Me", performed by Chanmina, and the ending theme is "Serenade" (セレナーデ, Serenāde), performed by Natori.

The anime also features several original songs, including "Pop in 2", "Star T Rain", and "B's Revenge" by the in-series group B-Komachi.

== Reception ==
=== Popularity ===
Oshi no Ko ranked fifth on AnimeJapan's fifth "Most Wanted Anime Adaptation" poll in 2022. The premiere episode of the series, "Mother and Children", was reported by Hidive as the most successful premiere in the streaming service's history in terms of total viewers, new subscribers, and free trial signups. The opening theme, "Idol" by Yoasobi, also achieved international chart success. It reached a total of 100 million worldwide stream and video views on Spotify and YouTube within two weeks after the anime's release. The song also topped the Billboard Global 200 Excl. U.S. charts with 45.7 million streams and 24,000 copies sold outside the U.S. "Idol" has become the first Japanese song and anime song to top the Billboard Global chart as well as taking the first spot on the Apple Music's Top 100: Global chart.

In a survey of "Favorite Anime of 2023" on the Japanese website Otona Answer which was responded to by over 2,600 young Japanese anime fans, Oshi no Ko ranked first among Generation Z for the first half of the year. According to a 2023 poll conducted by education and publishing company Benesse, which asked 18,802 third to sixth-grade Japanese children (12,859 girls, 4,728 boys and 1,215 others), Ai Hoshino ranked third below the "friend" and "mother" on the top 10 most admired people. According to the survey, Ai's singing and dancing ability, cuteness, positivity, idol talent, and compassion for others were the reasons why she ranked higher. In the other poll, Yoasobi's "Idol" was ranked among the top 10 most popular words responded to by Japanese children, placing seventh. In the 2023 Google's Year in Search, "Idol" ranked as the top-trending song and was third in "Hum to Search: Top Songs" category.

=== Sales ===
According to Kadokawa Corporation, the Oshi no Ko anime series was its best-selling title by net sales in fiscal 2023, amassing over ¥3 billion in revenue. For the second quarter of 2024, the series managed to amass ¥4 billion in revenue.

=== Critical reception ===
The anime adaptation received widespread acclaim for its storytelling, animation quality, and thematic boldness. Lauren Orsini of Anime News Network wrote in her review of the premiere that Oshi no Ko "offers a potent combination: the glitz of the industry and the gritty darkness just underneath—and I'm certain we haven't even scratched the surface." Ali Griffiths of Digital Spy praised the series' depiction of the production of dating shows and Akane's cyberbullying, describing Oshi no Ko as a "compelling watch". Kambole Campbell of Polygon described in his review that "[the series] leverages the reincarnation premise for both the wild dramatic potential of its revenge plot line, but also as a way to have a pair of fans see behind the curtain, with different perspectives and impossible hindsight." In contrast, David Opie of Radio Times felt that the anime had changed its content and impact compared to its premiere episode, writing: "the show no longer stands out as unique in the same way that the first episode did."

Mike Hale of The New York Times listed Oshi no Ko as one of the best international shows of 2023, calling it both "sprightly" and "goofy". Vulture named it one of the best anime series of 2023, praising its humor and the handling of characters' performance from the expression of the feelings. The website wrote: "Aside from its unhinged backstory, the real fun of Oshi no Ko is the drama it mines from its analytical portrayal of the entertainment industry and how business conflicts with art."

Mitsushima Erio of Real Sound praised in their analysis that the animation quality in concert scenes captures "a power that comes from within and overwhelms the viewer in a way that defies rational explanation," adding that the first episode alone conveys "the same satisfaction felt after watching a high-quality film." In another article from the same publication, Nozawa Yoshinori highlighted that episodes six and seven, centered on online harassment and Akane's emotional recovery, "delicately portray the darkness of the entertainment industry and social media, and the human relationships of real life."

The second season, aired in summer 2024, also received critical praise. James Beckett of Anime News Network, previously skeptical of the first season, noted in his preview guide that by the second season he had come to fully appreciate the series' strengths, particularly "how the story interrogates the complex and often toxic nature of life in the entertainment industry," concluding that "Oshi no Ko is a marvel." However, he again cited the main criticism regarding the protagonist Aqua, whose "cold, calculating personality makes him intrinsically hard to support." In contrast, Gracie Qu of Anime Trending considered the second season superior to the first, highlighting that the rivalry dynamic between Akane and Kana is refreshing as it depicts "two women competing to be the best in a ruthless industry," a trope usually reserved for male characters. Asian Movie Pulse highlighted that the season shows "the transformative power of theatre," noting that characters become a cast capable of moving audiences to tears with layered performances, and called the series "an informed and empathetic look at the world of stage and music video production."

The third season began airing on January 14, 2026. Lauren Orsini of Anime News Network, who had previously reviewed the first season, wrote in her analysis of the first two episodes that the season starts at such a remarkable level that it made her pretend and dream that the manga ending she didn't like "never happened", highlighting the new opening and ending as reflective of the series' central narrative themes: "flawless performances for a world that barely mirrors reality." She also expressed hope that the anime could serve as a re-reading of the story, especially if Doga Kobo can soften the original final problems or even change it in some way. CBR included the third season among the most notable anime releases of 2026, praising that "the mystery feels alive and the animation is impossible to look away from," noting that the series continues using the entertainment industry as a crime stage: "danger exists not just in dark alleys, but in contracts, connections, and the way powerful people protect their image."

=== Accolades ===
In 2023, Oshi no Ko won in the anime category while Yoasobi's "Idol" won in the song category of the Yahoo! Japan Search Awards, based on the number of searches for a particular term compared to the year before. The anime series also won the Grand Prize at Japan's Internet Buzzword Awards. At the 8th Crunchyroll Anime Awards in 2024, Yoasobi's "Idol" won the award for Best Anime Song while the anime series was nominated for eleven other categories including Anime of the Year. The series received the award for Animation of the Year, while Yoasobi won Best Music for their work at the Tokyo Anime Award Festival. It won the 2024 Excellence Award at Japan's 29th annual Association of Media in Digital (AMD) Awards. The series also won the Character License Award at the Japan Character Awards by Japan's Character Brand Licensing Association (CBLA).

=== Awards and nominations ===
Year	Award	Category	Recipient	Result	Ref.
2023	MTV Video Music Awards Japan	Video of the Year	"Idol" by Yoasobi	Nominated	
2023	MTV Video Music Awards Japan	Best Animation Video	"Idol" by Yoasobi	Won	
2023	MTV Video Music Awards Japan	Song of the Year	"Idol" by Yoasobi	Won	
2023	13th Newtype Anime Awards	Best Character (Female)	Ai Hoshino	5th place	
2023	13th Newtype Anime Awards	Best Character (Female)	Ruby Hoshino	9th place	
2023	13th Newtype Anime Awards	Best Voice Actor	Rie Takahashi	2nd place	
2023	13th Newtype Anime Awards	Best Theme Song	"Idol" by Yoasobi	2nd place	
2023	U-Can New Words and Buzzwords Awards	New Words and Buzzwords Awards	Oshi no Ko	Nominated	
2023	U-Can New Words and Buzzwords Awards	New Words and Buzzwords Awards	"Idol" by Yoasobi	Nominated	
2023	Yahoo! Japan Search Awards	Anime Category	Oshi no Ko	Won	
2023	Yahoo! Japan Search Awards	Music Category	"Idol" by Yoasobi	Won	
2023	29th Manga Barcelona Awards	Best Anime Series Premiere	Oshi no Ko	Nominated	
2023	Billboard Japan Music Awards	Hot 100	"Idol" by Yoasobi	Won	
2023	Billboard Japan Music Awards	Most Streaming Songs	"Idol" by Yoasobi	Won	
2023	Billboard Japan Music Awards	Most Downloaded Songs	"Idol" by Yoasobi	Won	
2023	Billboard Japan Music Awards	Hot Animation	"Idol" by Yoasobi	Won	
2023	Billboard Japan Music Awards	Top User Generated Songs	"Idol" by Yoasobi	Won	
2023	Billboard Japan Music Awards	TikTok Weekly Top 20	"Idol" by Yoasobi	2nd place	
2023	IGN Awards	Best Anime Series	Oshi no Ko	Runner-up	
2023	Internet Buzzword Awards	Grand Prize	Oshi no Ko	Won	
2023	TikTok Trend Awards	Music Category	"Idol" by Yoasobi	Won	
2023	Reiwa Anisong Awards	Best Work Award	"Idol" by Yoasobi	Won	
2023	Reiwa Anisong Awards	Best Anime Song Award	"Idol" by Yoasobi	Won	
2023	Reiwa Anisong Awards	Character Song Award	"Piiman Taiso" by Kana Arima (Megumi Han)	Nominated	
2023	Reiwa Anisong Awards	Artist Song Award	"Mephisto" by Queen Bee	Won	
2023	Reiwa Anisong Awards	Project Award	"Our Sign is B" (Ai's Solo Ver. & New Arrange Ver.) by Ai Hoshino (Rie Takahashi) & Ruby Hoshino (Yurie Igoma), Kana Arima (Megumi Han), and Mem-cho (Rumi Okubo)	Nominated	
2023	Reiwa Anisong Awards	User Voting Award	"Idol" by Yoasobi	4th place	
2023	Abema Anime Trend Awards	Japan Anime Trend Award	Oshi no Ko	Won	
2023	Abema Anime Trend Awards	Anime Song Award	"Idol" by Yoasobi	Won	
2023	AT-X	Top Anime Ranking	Oshi no Ko	Won	
2023	AT-X 25th Anniversary	Favorite Series	Oshi no Ko	3rd place	
2023	AT-X 25th Anniversary	Recommended Series	Oshi no Ko	7th place	
2023	AT-X 25th Anniversary	Favorite Anisong	"Idol" by Yoasobi	Won	
2023	65th Japan Record Awards	Best Composition Award	"Idol" by Yoasobi (Note: Ayase is credited as the nominee)	Won	
2024	D-Anime Store Awards	Most Interesting Plot Developments	Oshi no Ko	Won	
2024	8th Crunchyroll Anime Awards	Anime of the Year	Oshi no Ko	Nominated	
2024	8th Crunchyroll Anime Awards	Best Supporting Character	Kana Arima	Nominated	
2024	8th Crunchyroll Anime Awards	Best Director	Daisuke Hiramaki	Nominated	
2024	8th Crunchyroll Anime Awards	Best Drama	Oshi no Ko	Nominated	
2024	8th Crunchyroll Anime Awards	Best New Series	Oshi no Ko	Nominated	
2024	8th Crunchyroll Anime Awards	Best Character Design	Kanna Hirayama	Nominated	
2024	8th Crunchyroll Anime Awards	Best Art Direction	Tetsuya Usami	Nominated	
2024	8th Crunchyroll Anime Awards	Best Score	Takurō Iga	Nominated	
2024	8th Crunchyroll Anime Awards	Best Anime Song	"Idol" by Yoasobi	Won	
2024	8th Crunchyroll Anime Awards	Best Opening Sequence	"Idol" by Yoasobi	Nominated	
2024	8th Crunchyroll Anime Awards	Best Ending Sequence	"Mephisto" by Queen Bee	Nominated	
2024	8th Crunchyroll Anime Awards	Best VA Performance (French)	Martin Faliu as Aqua	Nominated	
2024	Tokyo Anime Award Festival	Animation of the Year (Television)	Oshi no Ko	Won	
2024	Tokyo Anime Award Festival	Best Music	Yoasobi	Won	
2024	29th AMD Awards	Excellence Award	Oshi no Ko	Won	
2024	38th Japan Gold Disc Awards	Song of the Year by Download (Japanese)	"Idol" by Yoasobi	Won	
2024	38th Japan Gold Disc Awards	Best 3 Songs by Download	"Idol" by Yoasobi	Won	
2024	38th Japan Gold Disc Awards	Song of the Year by Streaming (Japanese)	"Idol" by Yoasobi	Won	
2024	38th Japan Gold Disc Awards	Best 5 Songs by Streaming	"Idol" by Yoasobi	Won	
2024	42nd JASRAC Awards	Gold Award	"Idol" by Yoasobi	Won	
2024	Japan Character Awards	Character License Award	Oshi no Ko	Won	
2024	46th Anime Grand Prix	Best Theme Song	"Idol" by Yoasobi	2nd place	
2024	Japan Expo Awards	Daruma for Best Anime	Oshi no Ko	Nominated	
2024	Japan Expo Awards	Daruma for Best Suspense Anime	Oshi no Ko	Nominated	
2024	Japan Expo Awards	Daruma for Best Slice of Life Anime	Oshi no Ko	Nominated	
2024	Japan Expo Awards	Daruma for Best Original Soundtrack	Oshi no Ko	Nominated	
2024	Japan Expo Awards	Daruma for Best Opening	"Idol" by Yoasobi	Won	
2024	Japan Expo Awards	Daruma for Best Ending	"Mephisto" by Queen Bee	Nominated	
2024	19th AnimaniA Awards	Best TV Series: Online	Oshi no Ko	Nominated	
2024	19th AnimaniA Awards	Best Anime Song	"Idol" by Yoasobi	Nominated	
2024	Billboard Japan Music Awards	Hot 100	"Idol" by Yoasobi	4th place	
2024	Billboard Japan Music Awards	Most Streaming Songs	"Idol" by Yoasobi	5th place	
2024	Billboard Japan Music Awards	Most Downloaded Songs	"Idol" by Yoasobi	11th place	
2024	Billboard Japan Music Awards	Hot Animation	"Idol" by Yoasobi	2nd place	
2024	Billboard Japan Music Awards	Hot Animation	"Fatal" by Gemn	13th place	
2024	Billboard Japan Music Awards	Top User Generated Songs	"Idol" by Yoasobi	2nd place	
2024	Billboard Japan Music Awards	Top User Generated Songs	"Fatal" by Gemn	20th place	
2024	Billboard Japan Music Awards	Top Global Japan (Excl. Japan) Songs	"Idol" by Yoasobi	2nd place	
2024	Billboard Japan Music Awards	Top Japan Songs (South Korea)	"Idol" by Yoasobi	3rd place	
2024	Billboard Japan Music Awards	Top Japan Songs (Thailand)	"Idol" by Yoasobi	6th place	
2024	Billboard Japan Music Awards	Top Japan Songs (Singapore)	"Idol" by Yoasobi	Won	
2024	Billboard Japan Music Awards	Top Japan Songs (India)	"Idol" by Yoasobi	7th place	
2024	Billboard Japan Music Awards	Top Japan Songs (France)	"Idol" by Yoasobi	3rd place	
2024	Billboard Japan Music Awards	Top Japan Songs (United Kingdom)	"Idol" by Yoasobi	6th place	
2024	Billboard Japan Music Awards	Top Japan Songs (South Africa)	"Idol" by Yoasobi	9th place	
2024	Billboard Japan Music Awards	Top Japan Songs (United States)	"Idol" by Yoasobi	4th place	
2024	Billboard Japan Music Awards	Top Japan Songs (Brazil)	"Idol" by Yoasobi	13th place	
2024	30th Manga Barcelona Awards	Best Anime Series Premiere	Oshi no Ko Season 2	Won	
2024	IGN Awards	Best Anime Series	Oshi no Ko Season 2	Runner-up	
2024	Abema Anime Trend Awards	Anime News Award	Oshi no Ko	Won	
2025	Reiwa Anisong Awards	Composition Award	"Fatal" by Gemn (Note: Tatsuya Kitani is credited as the nominee)	Won	
2025	Reiwa Anisong Awards	Artist Song Award	"Burning" by Hitsujibungaku	Nominated	
2025	AT-X	Top Anime Ranking	Oshi no Ko	5th place	
2025	D-Anime Store Awards	Most Interesting Plot Developments	Oshi no Ko Season 2	Won	
2025	MTV Video Music Awards Japan	Best Rock Video	"Burning" by Hitsujibungaku	Won	
2025	MTV Video Music Awards Japan	Best Trending Video	"Fatal" by Gemn	Won	
2025	43rd JASRAC Awards	Gold Award	"Idol" by Yoasobi	Won	
2025	Music Awards Japan	Song of the Year	"Idol" by Yoasobi	Nominated	
2025	Music Awards Japan	Top Global Hit from Japan	"Idol" by Yoasobi	Won	
2025	Music Awards Japan	Best Japanese Song	"Idol" by Yoasobi	Nominated	
2025	Music Awards Japan	Top Japanese Song in Asia	"Idol" by Yoasobi	Nominated	
2025	Music Awards Japan	Top Japanese Song in Europe	"Idol" by Yoasobi	Nominated	
2025	Music Awards Japan	Top Japanese Song in Latin America	"Idol" by Yoasobi	Nominated	
2025	Music Awards Japan	Best Japanese Dance Pop Song	"Idol" by Yoasobi	Nominated	
2025	Music Awards Japan	Best Japanese Alternative Song	"Burning" by Hitsujibungaku	Nominated	
2025	Music Awards Japan	Best Anime Song	"Idol" by Yoasobi	Won	
2025	Music Awards Japan	Best Music Video	"Idol" by Yoasobi	Won	
2025	Music Awards Japan	Best Viral Song	"Idol" by Yoasobi	Nominated	
2025	Music Awards Japan	Best of Listeners' Choice: Japanese Song	"Idol" by Yoasobi	Nominated	
2025	Music Awards Japan	Best of Listeners' Choice: Japanese Song	"Fatal" by Gemn	Nominated	
2025	Music Awards Japan	Song of the Year for Creators	"Idol" by Yoasobi (Note: Awarded to Ayase)	Won	
2025	9th Crunchyroll Anime Awards	Best Continuing Series	Oshi no Ko Season 2	Nominated	
2025	9th Crunchyroll Anime Awards	Best Drama	Oshi no Ko Season 2	Nominated	
2025	9th Crunchyroll Anime Awards	Best Anime Song	"Fatal" by Gemn	Nominated	
2025	9th Crunchyroll Anime Awards	Best Opening Sequence	"Fatal" by Gemn	Nominated	
2025	9th Crunchyroll Anime Awards	Best Ending Sequence	"Burning" by Hitsujibungaku	Nominated	
2025	Japan Expo Awards	Daruma for Best Anime	Oshi no Ko Season 2	Nominated	
2025	Japan Expo Awards	Daruma for Best Suspense Anime	Oshi no Ko Season 2	Nominated	
2025	Japan Expo Awards	Daruma for Best Original Soundtrack	Takurō Iga	Nominated	
2025	Japan Expo Awards	Daruma for Best Opening	"Fatal" by Gemn	Nominated	
2025	Japan Expo Awards	Daruma for Best Ending	"Burning" by Hitsujibungaku	Nominated	
2025	47th Anime Grand Prix	Grand Prix	Oshi no Ko Season 2	8th place	
2025	47th Anime Grand Prix	Best Theme Song	"Fatal" by Gemn	8th place	
2025	20th AnimaniA Awards	Best TV Series: Disc	Oshi no Ko	Won	
2025	20th AnimaniA Awards	Best Anime Song	"Fatal" by Gemn	Nominated	
2025	15th Newtype Anime Awards	Best Work (TV/Streaming)	Oshi no Ko Season 2	10th place	

=== Controversy ===
The sixth episode of the anime, which depicts the character Akane Kurokawa becoming a target of cyberbullying and subsequently attempting suicide after starring in a controversial episode of a reality television program, was noted by critics for its parallels to a similar real-life case of the suicide of Hana Kimura, a Japanese professional wrestler. Some viewers commented that the manga chapters on which the episode was based were planned prior to Kimura's death. Kimura's mother, professional wrestler Kyoko Kimura, criticized the episode for the similarity, saying that she did not approve of the case "being used like free source material" by the anime writers. Kimura further stated that she felt the topic was portrayed with no consideration for real-life cyberbullying victims. The series' English licensor, Sentai Filmworks, added an advisory message to the end of the episode providing the phone number to the National Suicide Prevention Lifeline on its streaming service, Hidive.
