= Mother and Children (Oshi no Ko) =

- Oshi no Ko episode
- Key visual for the episode's theatrical release
- Episode no.: Season 1 Episode 1
- Directed by: Daisuke Hiramaki, Chao Nekotomi, Asami Nakatani, Ryōta Itō & Sung Min Kim
- Written by: Jin Tanaka
- Based on: Oshi no Ko volume 1
- Editing by: Kentarō Tsubone
- Original release date: 17 March 2023
- Running time: 82 minutes

Episode chronology
← Previous —	Next → "Third Option"

"Mother and Children" is the series premiere of the Japanese anime television series Oshi no Ko, an adaptation of the manga series Oshi no Ko by Aka Akasaka. The episode received a theatrical release on 17 March 2023, and released on streaming platform Hidive on 12 April 2023.

== Synopsis ==
Dr. Gorou Amamiya is an avid fan of the idol Ai Hoshino, spurred on partly due to her being the favorite idol of a deceased patient of his named Sarina Tendouji. Gorou is shocked when Ai quietly arrives at his rural hospital twenty weeks pregnant with twins. On her due date, Gorou is pushed off a cliff by Ai's stalker, Ryosuke. He then wakes up and discovers he has been reborn as Ai's son Aquamarine and lives together with her and his twin sister Ruby, who herself is the reincarnation of Sarina. As time passes, the twins steadily learn more and more about the entertainment industry. One year later, Aqua becomes acquainted with both a film director and a child actress named Kana Arima. Two years later, on the day of her first major performance at Tokyo Dome, Ryosuke ends up fatally stabbing Ai, who realizes her love for the twins before dying in front of them. The twins are later formally adopted by the Saitous. Ruby decides she wants to follow in Ai's footsteps as an idol, while Aqua deduces that their biological father leaked Ai's address to Ryosuke, who committed suicide. In the final scene, Aqua and Ruby are high school students and Aqua sets his revenge plan in motion.

In an end-credits scene, Ai films a birthday video for Aqua and Ruby, where she wishes them the best for their futures.

== Voice cast ==
Aquamarine Hoshino (星野 愛久愛海, Hoshino Akuamarin) / Aqua (アクア, Akua)
Voiced by: Takeo Ōtsuka, Yumi Uchiyama (child) (Japanese); Jack Stansbury, Chaney Moore (child) (English)
Ruby Hoshino (星野 瑠美衣, Hoshino Rubii)
Voiced by: Yurie Igoma (Japanese); Alyssa Marek, (English)
Ai Hoshino (星野 アイ, Hoshino Ai)
Voiced by: Rie Takahashi (Japanese); Donna Bella Litton (English)
Kana Arima (有馬 かな, Arima Kana)
Voiced by: Megumi Han (Japanese); Natalie Rial (English)
Gorou Amamiya (雨宮 吾郎, Amamiya Gorō)
Voiced by: Kent Itō (Japanese); Jeremy Gee (English)
Sarina Tendōji (天童寺 さりな, Tendōji Sarina)
Voiced by: Tomoyo Takayanagi (Japanese); Savanna Menzel (English)

== Production ==
The episode is 82 minutes long. The episode was directed by Daisuke Hiramaki, Chao Nekotomi, Asami Nakatani, Ryōta Itō & Sung Min Kim, storyboarded by Daisuke Hiramaki, Chao Nekotomi & Asami Nakatani, with chief animation directed by Kanna Hirayama, and written by Jin Tanaka.

=== Pre-production ===
The first episode is notable for its lengthy runtime. This creative decision by the production staff was to be as faithful to the original manga as possible, and to avoid splitting the first volume into multiple episodes without cutting scenes, with Daisuke Hiramaki saying they planned it as a "special episode" to be screened in theatres. Producer Takuya Yoshioka said that "the length didn't matter, we wanted to make volume one into a single, complete episode".

=== Production ===
Animation producer Ryo Kobayashi, said that the episode had 1,000 cuts compared to around 300 for a standard anime episode. Kobayashi also said that it was their first time making a 90 minute episode, and that it was "probably a first for the whole anime industry".

Producer Shimpei Yamashita said that choreography took place "even before the music and the lyrics", with the animation being based on choreography created by a professional. Hiramaki suggested a new method for the choreography, which was creating 3D images from the dance videos, and at the same time drawing the storyboard based on the song, with the two being combined at the animation stage.

Assistant director Ciao Nekotomi said that hand-drawn cuts with brushes were included to create "vivid and striking" art styles. The composition method chosen was colour grading, where the item colour is chosen and effects are added in composition.

=== Music ===
The composition for episode 1 was performed by composer Takurō Iga. Yamashita stated that, as the first episode was 90 minutes, they wanted to use "film scoring, where the image comes first, then the music".

For the scene where Ai is stabbed, film scoring was used to compose the music. Sound Director Takeshi Takadera said that seeing a character's death was shocking, so to avoid it being solely a "sad and depressing" scene, Iga composed a solely piano piece, being the final track out of 60 that he made for the season. Hiramaki had ordered the music such that it reflected the characters emotions, and had expected it to reflect the sad emotions of Aqua and Ruby, but Iga composed it to instead reflect the affection of Ai, finding the choice "fascinating". Iga said that "the song itself isn't 120%, but it becomes 120% when put together with the images".

== Release ==
The episode was theatrically released on 17 March 2023, with broadcast release on 12 April 2023.

== Reception ==
Radio Times reported that after its first episode, Oshi no Ko had become the highest-rated anime of all time on MyAnimeList. "Mother and Children" was reported by Hidive as the most successful premiere in the streaming service's history in terms of total viewers, new subscribers, and free trial signups.

Critical reception to the feature-length premiere was strongly positive, with reviewers widely noting both the episode's ambitious scope and its thematic focus on the idol industry. Writing for The People's Movies, Robert Ewing awarded the episode 4.5 stars, describing it as "a work of art" and praising its pacing, animation, and emotional impact. Ewing highlighted the episode's depiction of the entertainment industry's pressures and commended the episode's ability to balance humour and tragedy.

Tony Sun Prickett of Anime Feminist offered a more mixed but still largely favourable assessment, calling the premiere "a doozy" that combined "baffling" early tonal choices with a "profound" exploration of the emotional labour expected of young female performers. The review emphasised how the episode critiques the commodification of women in idol culture, while also expressing concern about the narrative's shift toward Aqua's perspective following the episode's ending. Lauren Orsini of Anime News Network praised the 90 minute runtime "because it takes the viewer on a journey. One minute you're wondering if the person who told you to watch it was a lot kinkier than you thought, and by the end of it all you're Ai Hoshino's biggest fan".

Chris Kincaid of Japan Powered praised the episode's thematic focus and handling of subtext, describing it as a "masterful" critique of idol culture and the emotional pressures placed on young entertainers. Kincaid highlighted Ai's characterisaion, noting the episode's portrayal of her joy, self-deception, and desperation for genuine affection as "layered and deeply human". He further praised the staging of Ai's death scene, calling its visual composition and symbolic use of colour "a striking example of what animation can achieve", and argued that the premiere could function as a standalone narrative work. The Review Geek described the premiere as "lengthy and impactful," drawing comparisons to Perfect Blue in its portrayal of the darker elements of celebrity culture. The review praised the emotional structure of the episode and the characterisation of Ai, while noting that some comedic elements and time jumps were less effective.

Similarly, Charles Hartford of But Why Tho? characterised the episode as "an emotional introduction" with a "heart-rending" conclusion, awarding it a 9.5/10. The review highlighted the animation and Ai's narrative arc as standout elements, though he acknowledged discomfort with scenes involving Aqua and Ruby's remembered adult identities early in the episode.

In contrast, Screen Rant provided a notable dissenting perspective, arguing that the reincarnation premise ultimately weakened the impact of the episode's central tragedy, suggesting that the emotional climax "would have been more impactful" if Aqua and Ruby were ordinary children rather than reincarnated adults.
