= List of Oshi no Ko episodes =

Key visual for the series

Oshi no Ko is a Japanese anime television series based on Aka Akasaka's Oshi no Ko manga series. Produced by Doga Kobo, the anime series is directed by Daisuke Hiramaki, with character designs by Kanna Hirayama. The music is composed by Takurō Iga. The first season, consisting of 11 episodes and adapting the first four volumes (chapters 1–40) of the manga series, aired from 12 April to 28 June 2023. The 90-minute first episode, "Mother and Children", also premiered at selected theaters in Japan on 17 March of the same year.

A second season was announced after the airing of the eleventh episode of the first season. It adapted volumes 5 to 8 (chapters 41–80; additionally 109 in the season finale) and aired from 3 July to 6 October 2024.

A third season was announced after the airing of the thirteenth episode of the second season. The season adapted volumes 9 to the middle part of 13 (chapters 81–127) and premiered on 14 January 2026. It ended with a one-hour special, which aired on 25 March of the same year.

A fourth and final season was announced after the airing of the eleventh episode of the third season.

The series is licensed by Sentai Filmworks and has been available for streaming on Hidive. An English dub premiered on 24 May 2023. The first season was released on Blu-ray on 25 June 2024. The second season was released on January 6, 2026. Medialink licensed the series in Asia-Pacific and streamed it on the Ani-One Asia YouTube channel. It premiered on Animax Asia on 30 October 2024. Crunchyroll is streaming the third season along with Hidive. On February 25, 2026, Crunchyroll announced that it had acquired the streaming rights for the first two seasons of the series in collaboration with Hidive. The first season was made available immediately, with the second season set to stream in Q2 of the same year.

== Series overview ==
Season	Episodes	Originally released	
Season	Episodes	First released	Last released
1	11	12 April 2023	28 June 2023
2	13	3 July 2024	6 October 2024
3	11	14 January 2026	25 March 2026

== Episodes ==
=== Season 1 (2023) ===
No. overall	No. in season	Title	Directed by	Storyboarded by	Chief animation directed by	Original release date
1	1	"Mother and Children"	Daisuke Hiramaki, Chao Nekotomi, Asami Nakatani, Ryōta Itō & Sung Min Kim	Daisuke Hiramaki, Chao Nekotomi & Asami Nakatani	Kanna Hirayama	12 April 2023
Dr. Gorou Amamiya, an obstetrician-gynecologist, is an avid fan of the idol Ai Hoshino, partly spurred on by a deceased patient of his, Sarina Tendouji. Gorou is shocked when Ai quietly arrives at his rural hospital in Takachiho, Miyazaki, twenty weeks pregnant with twins. On her due date, Gorou is pushed off a cliff by Ai's stalker, Ryosuke. He then wakes up and discovers he has been reborn as Ai's son, Aquamarine, and lives with her and his twin sister, Ruby, who is herself the reincarnation of Sarina. As time passes, the twins learn more about the entertainment industry. One year later, Aqua becomes acquainted with both a film director, Taishi Gotanda, and a child actress, Kana Arima. Two years later, Ai is fatally stabbed at her home by Ryosuke prior to her Tokyo Dome performance. Ai uses her remaining strength to express her love to the twins before passing away. After her death, the twins are formally adopted by her manager, Ichigo Saitou, and his wife, Miyako. Ruby decides to follow in Ai's footsteps as an idol, while Aqua deduces that their biological father leaked Ai's address to Ryosuke, who committed suicide shortly thereafter. Many years later, a vengeful Aqua sets his revenge plan in motion. A video recording is then shown of Ai cradling the twins, wishing they grow up to become healthy and accomplished.
2	2	"Third Option"; Transliteration: "Mittsume no Sentakushi" (Japanese: 三つ目の選択肢)	Sung Min Kim	Koji Masunari	Maho Yoshikawa & Kanna Hirayama	19 April 2023
In the ten years since Ai's death, Ichigo has fallen out of contact, B-Komachi was disbanded, and Miyako closed down Strawberry Productions' idol unit. Ruby has been consistently auditioning to become an idol, unaware that Aqua has been using his acting skills to secretly sabotage her. However, he cannot stop Ruby from being scouted by an underground idol group. Not trusting the management of said group, and wanting to support Ruby's dream of becoming an idol, Miyako decides to finally reopen Strawberry Productions' idol unit with Ruby as its first member. Meanwhile, Aqua works as Gotanda's apprentice but has given up on becoming an actor and is content to work behind the scenes to find his father for his revenge. Gotanda advises Aqua not to give up on his dreams so easily, causing him to recall Ai's last words to him. Eventually, Aqua and Ruby are admitted into the prestigious Youtou High School. While visiting the school after their interviews, the twins encounter Kana again, who is glad to see Aqua but shocked to learn that he is enrolled in the general education department instead of performing arts.
3	3	"Manga-Based TV Drama"; Transliteration: "Manga Gensaku Dorama" (Japanese: 漫画原作ドラマ)	Kōki Uchinomiya	Takudai Kakuchi & Kenta Ōnishi	Tomoya Atsumi	26 April 2023
Kana is eager to reconnect with Aqua and tries to talk him into getting back into acting, offering a role in a live-action adaptation of the manga series Sweet Today. She mentions she has connections to famed producer Masaya Kaburagi, whom Aqua recognizes as one of the names on Ai's secret contact list he found on her pre-pregnancy personal phone. Aqua agrees to take a role as an excuse to get close to Kaburagi. Through Kana's connections, Aqua secures a role as the show's villain, but he discovers it is a very low-quality production. Kana admits the show cast young male models and prioritized their looks over their acting ability to appeal to the female demographic, and she has been forced to hold back her own acting talent. She further explains that due to her spoiled behavior as a child, she quickly fell out of favor in the acting industry as she grew older. During a break in filming, Aqua overhears Kaburagi brag that he is taking advantage of Kana while the former is collecting some of the latter's discarded cigarettes. Despite having gotten what he came for, Aqua decides to stay and go all out on his acting.
4	4	"Actors"; Transliteration: "Yakusha" (Japanese: 役者)	Kuniyasu Nishina	Ryōta Itō	Miki Matsumoto	3 May 2023
Aqua uses his skills to set the scene up for Kana's performance, allowing Kana to show off her true acting skills, which earns the praise of the people still watching the show. At the wrap party, Aqua meets Kaburagi again, now knowing he is not his father, thanks to a paternity test. Kaburagi mentions that he knows about someone Ai had been spending time with in secret, and offers to tell Aqua who it is in return for starring in a reality dating show. Sometime later, Aqua and Ruby attend their first day at Youtou High School, where Ruby befriends fellow student and gravure model Minami Kotobuki. She introduces Minami to Aqua and mentions that the famous professional entertainer Frill Shiranui is also in her class, making Ruby self-conscious about her current lack of an established place in the entertainment industry. She pesters Miyako about Strawberry Productions moving forward with forming their idol group, but Miyako points out that it is not easy for a small company like theirs to recruit idols. Aqua then suggests recruiting Kana.
5	5	"Reality Dating Show"; Transliteration: "Ren'ai Riaritī Shō" (Japanese: 恋愛リアリティショー)	Sung Min Kim	Sung Min Kim	Kanna Hirayama	10 May 2023
While reluctant to risk her acting career by becoming an idol, Kana decides to sign up with Strawberry Productions so she can work alongside Aqua. However, she is shocked that his next job is for a reality dating show titled My Love with a Star Begins Now, where he stars alongside fashion model Yuki Sumi, dancer Nobuyuki Kumano, actress Akane Kurokawa, internet personality MEM-cho, and musician Kengo Morimoto. Even though Aqua is putting on an upbeat act for the show, Kana feels jealous of how he is interacting with his female co-stars. Meanwhile, Miyako gets to work starting up Strawberry Productions' new idol unit. She decides to have Ruby and Kana make their debut online and enlists the help of one of their veteran internet personalities, Pieyon, a masked physical training YouTuber. Pieyon determines that the quickest way for the girls to gain an online following is to collaborate with his established channel. They perform a rigorous workout dance routine for an hour straight, with Ruby earning Kana's respect after seeing her last the entire hour. Pieyon then asks them what their group name will be, and Ruby decides to revive the name of B-Komachi.
6	6	"Egosurfing"; Transliteration: "Ego Sāchi" (Japanese: エゴサーチ)	Kuniyasu Nishina	Kuniyasu Nishina	Tomoya Atsumi, Majiro & Masato Katsumata	17 May 2023
As the season for Love Now continues, Aqua comes to learn that reality show stars are less scripted and more genuine than he had initially thought. Kana teaches Ruby about the importance and dangers of egosurfing, since idols need to carefully manage their online appearance and reputation, as one wrong move could prove fatal to their career. The show soon begins focusing on a love triangle between Yuki, Nobuyuki, and Kengo, with Aqua deciding to stay out of it to avoid drawing attention to himself; MEM-cho enjoys seeing her subscriber numbers increase. However, Akane struggles to stand out and gain attention, leaving her with the least screentime among the others. Under pressure from her agency to get results, Akane briefly loses her composure and slaps Yuki on film, accidentally scratching her face with her freshly-painted nails. While Yuki forgives Akane and Akane herself posts a formal apology, Akane becomes the target of cyberbullying by Yuki's fans. After being constantly bombarded with negative comments both online and in real life, Akane falls into a state of depression and nearly leaps off a pedestrian overpass during a typhoon, only being saved by a last-second intervention from Aqua.
7	7	"Buzz"; Transliteration: "Bazu" (Japanese: バズ)	Yasuhiro Irie	Yasuhiro Irie	Miki Matsumoto	24 May 2023
As Aqua narrowly saves Akane's life, Kana and Miyako caution Ruby that it is not uncommon for celebrities to commit suicide due to harassment, especially online. Meanwhile, Aqua and Akane are brought to the police station, where the rest of the Love Now cast goes to meet them. Aqua advises Akane that she can still drop out of the show despite being under contract, but Akane decides to stay on. Angry at the show staff who edited the footage to cast Akane as a villain, Aqua concocts a plan. First, he leaks news about Akane's attempted suicide to the media before enlisting the help of the cast members to create a video to rehabilitate Akane's image. The video proves successful, and most of the harassment against Akane dies down. MEM-cho and Yuki then suggest that Akane use her acting skills to adopt a persona that would appeal to Aqua's tastes. When Aqua reveals his liking for Ai, Akane aggressively studies her to emulate her behavior. At the next filming session, Akane officially returns to the show, and Aqua is shocked by how perfectly Akane mimics Ai's personality.
8	8	"First Time"; Transliteration: "Hajimete" (Japanese: 初めて)	Daisuke Hiramaki	Moe Suzuki & Hiroaki Yoshikawa	Kanna Hirayama	7 June 2023
Aqua is caught off guard by Akane's performance and is left to reflect on what exactly his feelings for her and Ai are. After having a short talk with Kana, he is able to sort out his feelings. He realizes that he has no particular attraction to Akane herself, but upon learning that she is skilled at profiling, Aqua decides to manipulate her to make use of her skills. On the final episode of Love Now, he openly kisses Akane on camera, to Kana's annoyance. At the wrap party, Aqua meets with Kaburagi, who agrees to hold up his end of the deal and arranges for a meeting next week. He then talks with Akane, and they both agree to pretend they are dating to keep up appearances. Akane also points out that Yuki has started dating Nobuyuki for real, despite rejecting him on the show. After the party, MEM-cho teases Aqua about his feelings for Akane and reveals that she had originally wanted to become an idol but gave up after several setbacks. Aqua offers her the opportunity to join the reformed B-Komachi, which catches her off guard.
9	9	"B-Komachi" (Japanese: B小町)	Kōki Uchinomiya, Sung Min Kim & Daisuke Hiramaki	Hiroaki Yoshikawa	Tomoya Atsumi, Masato Katsumata & Majiro	14 June 2023
Miyako interviews MEM-cho and correctly guesses that, at 25, she is much older than she claims to be. MEM-cho explains the situation that ultimately led her to become a streamer. Ruby and Kana overhear MEM-cho's story and accept her into B-Komachi. Meanwhile, the recent season of Love Now has put Aqua in the public spotlight, especially among females, while MEM-cho's popularity has also drawn attention to the new B-Komachi. She comes up with the idea of reusing the old B-Komachi's songs, but Kana has difficulty keeping up with Ruby and MEM-cho during training, and she acts coldly towards Aqua out of jealousy due to his relationship with Akane. Aqua meets with Kaburagi again, who reveals Ai's secret lover is likely a member of Akane's theater group, Lalalie. He also shows an interest in the revived B-Komachi and offers to secure them a spot in the upcoming Japan Idol Festival. Ruby and MEM-cho get into a competition over who will be the group's center. However, when they research Kana's music career, they discover that she is actually a very talented singer despite her claims to the contrary.
10	10	"Pressure"; Transliteration: "Puresshā" (Japanese: プレッシャー)	Yūji Tokuno	Yūji Tokuno	Miki Matsumoto	21 June 2023
Ruby and MEM-cho decide that Kana would be the best center, but Kana rejects this proposal. However, after hearing the other two sing and practice the routine, she relents. To help prepare the girls in the lead-up to the JIF, Miyako brings Pieyon back to coach them. In reality, it is actually Aqua disguising himself as Pieyon. The night before the concert, Kana learns a bit about Ruby's past and her motivations for becoming an idol. She decides to wander downstairs and, by accident, finds out that Aqua is posing as Pieyon. On the day of the JIF, B-Komachi are crammed into a crowded room where dozens of other underground or lesser-known idol groups are fighting for space. Kana spends much of the day brooding over her own failed path to stardom. She even admits to a nervous Ruby that she herself is more nervous going out as a group. However, Ruby reassures her by pointing out that the three of them are all rookie idols, so failure should be expected. No longer afraid, Kana starts taking her position as the center more seriously just as B-Komachi's performance is about to begin.
11	11	"Idol"; Transliteration: "Aidoru" (Japanese: アイドル)	Kuniyasu Nishina & Daisuke Hiramaki	Sumie Noro	Kanna Hirayama	28 June 2023
B-Komachi begins their performance, and their first song goes well. However, Kana begins to lose self-confidence when she sees that most of the audience are there only to see Ruby and MEM-cho. However, she witnesses Aqua among the crowd, cheering them on, and suddenly finds her motivation. The performance is a huge success, and on the way home, Kana learns that Aqua's relationship with Akane is merely professional to keep up appearances. A relieved Kana starts interacting normally with Aqua, while MEM-cho senses a looming love triangle between them and Akane. Sometime later, Lalalie is selected to perform a stage adaptation of the popular manga Tokyo Blade, and Kaburagi is asked to provide some outside talent since Lalalie has few young performers. Kana and Akane are both cast in a love triangle alongside Aqua, and Aqua discovers that the two actresses have had an intense rivalry since their child-actress days. With the casting complete, the crew for the Tokyo Blade play begins their preparations, Ruby heads off to visit Ai's grave, and Aqua swears once again to track down their father.

=== Season 2 (2024) ===
No. overall	No. in season	Title	Directed by	Storyboarded by	Chief animation directed by	Original release date
12	1	"Tokyo Blade"; Transliteration: "Tōkyō Bureido" (Japanese: 東京ブレイド)	Kuniyasu Nishina	Kuniyasu Nishina	Kanna Hirayama	3 July 2024
Four months after B-Komachi's debut at the JIF, Aqua, Kana, and Akane begin rehearsals for the Tokyo Blade stage play alongside their co-stars, Melt Narushima, Sakuya Kamoshida, and Taiki Himekawa. Meanwhile, B-Komachi has been steadily gaining in popularity, holding numerous small concerts for its fans. Aqua takes the opportunity of getting closer to the Lalalie director, Toshirou Kindaichi, in hopes of finding his father, while the play's executive producer, Sumiaki Raida, oversees the production. During rehearsals, Kana and Taiki are shown to have highly compatible acting styles. At the same time, Akane struggles to keep up with Kana due to her character, Princess Saya, being less popular than Kana's character, Tsurugi. Since Princess Saya does not have a large role in the manga, Akane does not have enough material to properly immerse herself, which is not helped by the scriptwriter, GOA, changing Princess Saya's personality. GOA admits he did it to fit in the play's two-hour runtime, which Kindaichi supports. The creators of Tokyo Blade and Sweet Today, Abiko Samejima and Yoriko Kichijouji, respectively, then visit one of the rehearsals. After observing it, Abiko announces that she wants the entire script to be rewritten.
13	2	"Game of Telephone"; Transliteration: "Dengon Gēmu" (Japanese: 伝言ゲーム)	Kazue Komatsu	Daisuke Hiramaki	Satomi Watabe	10 July 2024
In a flashback to the cast's preliminary meeting, Akane was glad to co-star alongside Aqua again, stoking Kana's jealousy. Melt later apologized to Kana for doing a poor job on the Sweet Today series and promised he improved his acting since then. Elsewhere, Abiko met with Yoriko, expressing her anxiety at her manga being adapted for a play, and Yoriko was concerned Abiko's eccentric personality would disrupt the production. Back in the present, Abiko is furious at GOA for refusing to listen to any of her input and changing the personalities of many of her characters. Yoriko observes that disputes between authors and scriptwriters are normal. It is then revealed that by the time Abiko's input reached GOA, the meaning had changed due to it passing through several intermediaries via miscommunication. Abiko forces the crew to let her rewrite the script, threatening to withdraw her consent to the play. GOA voluntarily steps down from his position, frustrated by his inability to satisfy Abiko's demands. With rehearsals on hold until the new script is finalized, Akane invites Aqua on a date to show him a modern theater play.
14	3	"Rewriting"; Transliteration: "Riraitingu" (Japanese: リライティング)	Daisuke Nishimura	Daisuke Nishimura	Honoka Yokoyama	17 July 2024
While happy that B-Komachi is gaining popularity, Ruby is still frustrated that she is lagging behind her friends. However, B-Komachi's concerts are on hold until Kana finishes the play. Meanwhile, Akane takes Aqua to IHI Stage Around Tokyo, a 360-degree revolving theater, to see a play of Smash Heaven where he is impressed with the presentation and acting. After the show, they encounter Raida, who reveals that GOA wrote Smash Heaven. Aqua concludes that Abiko will not be able to write a script suited for the Tokyo Blade play, and asks Raida to find a way to reinstate GOA as the play's writer. Enjoying GOA's work, Aqua decides to take a more direct approach and asks Yoriko to deliver an envelope to Abiko. Yoriko heads to Abiko's apartment and is shocked to see her overworking herself to meet the deadline for the latest Tokyo Blade chapter and the play's script. While Yoriko helps Abiko finish the chapter, they have a passionate argument over their respective manga, then reconcile in the morning. Later, Abiko opens Aqua's envelope and finds a ticket to the play Smash Heaven, which she decides to attend.
15	4	"Emotional Acting"; Transliteration: "Kanjō Engi" (Japanese: 感情演技)	Kōki Uchinomiya	Kōki Uchinomiya	Haruka Inade	24 July 2024
Abiko sees the Smash Heaven play and is impressed by it. Raida learns that Abiko is in the audience and meets her personally, requesting that she give GOA a second chance. Recalling Yoriko's advice about meeting people halfway, Abiko agrees, on the condition that she personally supervises his writing. Raida takes the risk of letting them work together remotely. GOA and Abiko end up getting along quite well and they finish a revised version of the script overnight. Most of the cast are excited about the new script, but the less experienced Aqua and Melt are worried they cannot keep up. Kana warns Aqua that his tendency to bottle up his emotions will make it difficult for him to project them to a live audience, and advises that he concentrate on channeling both sad and happy memories. However, while attempting to recall his memories, Aqua's remembrance of Ai's death causes him to suffer a panic attack. He has Akane take him to Gotanda's apartment to recuperate, and Gotanda tells Akane that Aqua still suffers from post-traumatic stress disorder from a past tragedy. Deducing that Aqua is actually Ai's son, Akane promises to support him.
16	5	"The Curtain Rises"; Transliteration: "Kaimaku" (Japanese: 開幕)	Kazuma Ogasawara	Yasuhiro Irie	Yūta Kevin Kenmotsu & Kanna Hirayama	31 July 2024
After Aqua recovers, Akane promises that she will support him no matter what, even after he tells her he is seeking to get revenge on somebody. In return, Akane asks Aqua to support her against Kana and Taiki, as she has no chance of surpassing them alone. Aqua agrees and consults Gotanda for advice, who agrees to help coach Aqua in mastering emotional acting. Meanwhile, Ruby and Minami try to meet Aqua at Lalalie, but run into Melt and Sakuya instead. Melt prevents Sakuya from flirting with Minami, and Sakuya angrily points out that Melt's poor acting is dragging down the play in response. Sakuya tricks Ruby into adding him to her contacts, but Kana and MEM-cho warn her that he is a skirt chaser, much to her disgust. As rehearsals continue, Kana and Akane's rivalry deepens as both actresses are determined to prove they can surpass the other. While Kana agrees to help coach Melt to improve his acting skills, Aqua, meanwhile, learns from Gotanda to channel his trauma into his acting. After the completion of rehearsals, the actors prepare for the play's premiere, and all of Aqua and Ruby's acquaintances arrive to see it.
17	6	"Growth"; Transliteration: "Seichō" (Japanese: 成長)	Chao Nekotomi	Chao Nekotomi	Satomi Watabe	7 August 2024
Act 1 of the Tokyo Blade play goes without a hitch, depicting Taiki's character, Blade, recruiting Kana and Melt's characters, Tsurugi and Kizami, and forming the "Shinjuku Faction" against the "Shibuya Faction" led by Akane, Aqua, and Sakuya's characters, Princess Saya, Touki, and Monme. Act 2 then starts with Melt engaging in a sword battle with Sakuya. While observing the performance, Raida wonders why Kaburagi recommended Melt, where Kaburagi admits he personally likes Melt and sees potential in him. On stage, Melt recalls how his good looks made him very popular in school, so he never had to put in any effort to improve his acting; it was not until he saw Aqua and Kana's acting in Sweet Today that he realized he was an inferior actor. Following Aqua's advice, Melt focused all of his practice on mastering Kizami's duel with Monme. The audience, who already had a low opinion of Melt's acting in the play's earlier scenes, is caught off guard and amazed by Melt's sudden outburst of emotion. As a result, Melt's two biggest critics, Yoriko and Sakuya, gain a newfound respect for him, and he thanks Aqua for his help.
18	7	"Sun"; Transliteration: "Taiyō" (Japanese: 太陽)	Kuniyasu Nishina	Kuniyasu Nishina	Honoka Yokoyama	14 August 2024
The play continues with the Shinjuku and Shibuya factions battling each other, and Tsurugi ends up facing off against Princess Saya alone. During the scene, Akane recalls how, as a child, she idolized Kana and became an actress so she could be like her. However, when she first met Kana at an audition, they got into an argument over it being rigged in Kana's favor and Kana's disdain for fans like Akane. Alarmed and confused by the experience, Akane began studying psychological profiling to understand Kana's actions and realized that Kana's greatest fear was being unable to find work as she grew up, resulting in her holding back her own talent. As such, Akane decides to use the opportunity Tokyo Blade has given her to force Kana to return to her old, more confident acting style. Kana, while tempted to step up her act to match Akane, instinctively holds back, knowing that letting Akane take the spotlight would be better for the play as a whole. Backstage, Akane is frustrated that she could not bring out Kana's true self, but Aqua approaches her and assures her that together, they will drag Kana into the spotlight.
19	8	"Trigger"; Transliteration: "Torigā" (Japanese: トリガー)	Chao Nekotomi, Kuniyasu Nishina & Daisuke Hiramaki	Chao Nekotomi, Kuniyasu Nishina & Daisuke Hiramaki	Kanna Hirayama	21 August 2024
During an intermission between scenes, Taiki observes that Akane's acting has a risk of surpassing his and Kana's, so he tells Kana that in the next scene he will ad lib some of his performance. The next scene involves Aqua, Akane, Kana, and Taiki acting together. Taiki initiates his ad lib by saving Kana from Akane's sword strike and throwing her into Aqua's arms. Aqua takes the opportunity to do his own ad lib, focusing the audience's attention on Kana. Kana recalls feeling pressured to stay in the acting business at any cost to impress her mother. Recalling Aqua's words on her acting, Kana finally lets loose with the full scope of her acting, greatly impressing the crowd and Akane. Akane then steps in to take a sword strike from Taiki, acting out Princess Saya's death. Having figured out that Aqua is Ai's son, Gotanda advised Aqua that if he wished to act for the sake of revenge, he would need to channel all of his rage and despair into his acting. So, to avenge Princess Saya, Aqua channels his rage at Ai's death and attacks Taiki.
20	9	"Dream"; Transliteration: "Yume" (Japanese: 夢)	Daisuke Hiramaki & Kazue Komatsu	Daisuke Hiramaki & Kazue Komatsu	Haruka Inade & Ayaka Muroga	28 August 2024
Aqua gives an extremely convincing performance of rage and anguish that impresses even the other actors. After Touki is defeated on stage, Blade and Tsurugi explain that they can save Princess Saya by reversing the effect of her sword. As Princess Saya is revived, Aqua imagines what would have happened if Ai never died, and gives off an equally convincing performance of relief and catharsis. After the play ends, Akane and Kana remain convinced that the other is the superior actress, while Kindaichi and Kaburagi are impressed by their growth. Aqua, meanwhile, has taken the opportunity to test the DNA of all cast and production staff of the play. He then attends a party organized by Akane with the rest of the cast and approaches Kindaichi to learn what he knows, and he mentions that he adopted Taiki from an orphanage. Aqua then informs Taiki that a DNA test has shown they are half-brothers, meaning they likely share the same father.
21	10	"Liberation"; Transliteration: "Kaihō" (Japanese: カイホウ)	Daisuke Nishimura	Daisuke Nishimura	Honoka Yokoyama	11 September 2024
Taiki brings Aqua to his apartment and reveals that his real name is Taiki Uehara: his mother was Airi Himekawa, a well-known actress, while his father was another actor named Seijurou Uehara. However, both of them died in a double suicide many years ago. This revelation of his father's death causes Aqua to live his life free of his obsession with revenge. Meanwhile, MEM-cho brainstorms with Ruby and Kana on how to get one million subscribers for B-Komachi's YouTube channel. MEM-cho suggests posting room tour videos, leaving Ruby conflicted about whether she should remove her memorabilia of Ai to hide the fact that she is her daughter. That night, she reflects on how she wanted to revive B-Komachi not only to continue Ai's legacy but also to attract Gorou's attention, who had been missing since her and Aqua's birth. MEM-cho's other plan is to film a music video for an original song, but the composer Miyako hired, the original B-Komachi's songwriter and popstar, Himura, hasn't delivered on Miyako's deadline and is struggling for inspiration. As such, Ruby sends him a video message to encourage him. After the Tokyo Blade play concludes its run, Aqua agrees to accompany B-Komachi to help film their music video in Takachiho, the same town where he lived his previous life as Gorou.
22	11	"Freedom"; Transliteration: "Jiyū" (Japanese: 自由)	Takashi Takeuchi & Sho Kitamura	Yasuhiro Irie	Satomi Watabe	18 September 2024
To prepare for the trip to Takachiho, Kana offers to take Aqua shopping to buy a proper suitcase, to which he agrees. After spending most of the day together, Kana returns home, wondering whether it is possible to start dating Aqua and what his real relationship with Akane is. The next day, Aqua meets Akane with the intention of breaking up with her, to which she has already guessed. Aqua explains their relationship was never real to begin with, and since he found out his father is dead, there is no reason to pursue revenge anymore or drag Akane down with him, given her bright future. Akane herself remains unsure whether she has genuine romantic feelings for Aqua due to her own inexperience with love. However, through her profiling skills, Akane discovers logical inconsistencies in Aqua's story that suggest his father is still alive, but she remains conflicted about whether to tell Aqua. Meanwhile, Ruby visits Ai's grave. As she leaves, she unknowingly passes her and Aqua's biological father, who is aware of Ruby's identity, as he visits Ai's grave.
23	12	"Reunion"; Transliteration: "Saikai" (Japanese: 再会)	Kuniyasu Nishina	Kuniyasu Nishina	Haruka Inade & Ayaka Muroga	25 September 2024
Aqua invites Akane to come along for the trip to Takachiho, much to Ruby's delight and Kana's dismay. Upon arriving, they meet MEM-cho's friend and video creator, Anemone Monemone, who immediately gets B-Komachi to start filming their music video. At the same time, Aqua takes Akane to the local hospital to ask about the fate of his previous life, only to find out Gorou has been declared missing for 16 years. He then heads to the cliff where he died as Gorou, but does not find his corpse. Finally, he stops by his old house and tells Akane about Gorou's life. Unbeknownst to them, they are secretly being watched by a mysterious white-haired girl. While watching B-Komachi's performance at the studio, Akane warns Aqua about dating Kana, as idol interactions with men are considered taboo and lead to grave consequences. After her part of the filming ends, Ruby leaves with Akane, but a crow steals her inn key. As they chase it, Ruby recalls how she fell in love with Gorou since her previous life as Sarina after he inspired her to become an idol. However, when they chase the crow into a cave, they find the skeletal remains of Gorou, much to Ruby's disbelief.
24	13	"Wish"; Transliteration: "Negai" (Japanese: 願い)	Daisuke Hiramaki	Daisuke Hiramaki & Yasuhiro Irie	Kanna Hirayama	6 October 2024
Ruby's mood takes a much darker turn following the discovery of Gorou's body. Meanwhile, Aqua admits to Akane that he was subtly manipulating her to find Gorou's body. Now that he has closure, he can start a real relationship with Akane, and they share their first kiss as an actual couple. While visiting the hospital, Ruby is later approached by the white-haired girl, who informs her that the same man murdered both Ai and Gorou and that he had a middle-school-aged accomplice. From a conversation with Akane, Ruby surmises that Aqua's reasons for becoming an actor are to find the accomplice and to take revenge on him, compelling her to do the same. After filming concludes, the group stops by the local shrine to make some wishes, with Ruby wishing Aqua success in his quest for revenge. Six months following the trip, the release of B-Komachi's new music video, "POP IN 2", has been a massive success, further increasing the group's fame while Akane stars in a newly released film. Aqua and Ruby are in their second year of high school, and Akane and Kana are in their third year. Sometime later, Aqua and Ruby's father murders a woman, revealing he has the same type of star eyes as the Hoshinos.

=== Season 3 (2026) ===
No. overall	No. in season	Title	Directed by	Storyboarded by	Chief animation directed by	Original release date
25	1	"Down Bad"; Transliteration: "Irekomi" (Japanese: 入れ込み)	Daisuke Hiramaki	Daisuke Hiramaki	Kanna Hirayama	14 January 2026
As B-Komachi, Akane, and Aqua continue to grow within their respective industries, Kana grows cold when Aqua discloses that his relationship with Akane has become genuine. MEM-cho notices Kana's change in demeanor and asks her about her troubles. Kana confides that Aqua has been avoiding her, then says she wants to respect his relationship with Akane. MEM-cho meets Aqua after his shoot for the online variety show Dig Deep! One Chance, in which Aqua is a regular panelist. MEM-cho requests that he treat Kana more fairly, but Aqua rebuffs her, revealing he is keeping his distance from Kana to ensure her safety and avoid a repeat of the circumstances that led to Ai's death. MEM-cho infers this as care for Kana, and she respects Aqua's decision. Meanwhile, Ruby lands a gig for Dig Deep!, allowing her to work alongside Aqua to the latter's exasperation. Kaburagi reveals that Ruby approached him with the offer, leaving Aqua stunned with Ruby's sudden, calculated nature. Elsewhere, Ruby meets with Ichigo, who has kept a low profile for the past 12 years following Ai's death.
26	2	"Calculating"; Transliteration: "Dasan" (Japanese: 打算)	Ichinosuke Akikaze	Yasuhiro Irie	Daisuke Hiramaki & Ichinosuke Akikaze	21 January 2026
In order to meet people Ai was acquainted with to find her murderer, Ruby seeks advice on gaining fame from Ichigo, who tells Ruby to craft a persona tailored to her strengths. As a result, she deliberately juxtaposes her ditziness with Aqua's coolheaded persona in Dig Deep!, leaving Aqua more suspicious. Ruby also meets the show's assistant director, Shun Yoshizumi, who is pushed around by his superior, Urushibara. Shun is tasked with finding Tokyo Blade cosplayers to interview at Summer Comiket, but he is distressed when none are available. Ruby helps by convincing Minami to use the interview to advance her career, while Shun asks his younger VTuber sister, Mimi, to be an interviewee. Meanwhile, Akane and Aqua go out on a date, where Akane discerns that Aqua is taking his time to figure out his feelings for Kana. When Ruby remarks about the difficulty in securing permissions for Tokyo Blade, an anxious Shun asks Urushibara for confirmation. Shun discovers that the permissions were not secured in time as Urushibara requests a last-minute change to have the interviewees cosplay original characters, horrifying him. On the day of the interview, Ruby and the interviewees arrive at Tokyo Big Sight for Comiket.
27	3	"Correctness"; Transliteration: "Konpuraiansu" (Japanese: コンプライアンス)	Daisuke Nishimura	Daisuke Nishimura	Ayaka Muroga & Haruka Inade	28 January 2026
Ruby and the interviewees meet each other, during which Ruby introduces racy cosplayer Meiya as another interviewee. The group heads to the interview, but Meiya becomes offended by Dig Deep! and by Urushibara's disrespectful, objectifying attitude towards cosplayers. Meiya publishes her complaints online, sparking controversy and forcing Dig Deep! to issue a public apology. Urushibara admonishes Shun for the fallout, though he admits that television regulations forced him to act brazenly and violate boundaries, and he claims full responsibility. Shun languishes on his uncertain future when Ruby offers an episode pitch that investigates the process of Dig Deep!, and she also invites Meiya to set standards between cosplayers and production committees. Ruby hosts the episode, which reveals behind-the-scenes complications and showcases Urushibara in homemade Princess Saya cosplay as a sincere apology to Meiya, leaving the latter charmed and accepting it by rescinding her complaints. The episode becomes a success, and Ruby expresses satisfaction that things worked out, when Aqua confronts her, knowing about her involvement in its setup.
28	4	"Blind"; Transliteration: "Mōmoku" (Japanese: 盲目)	Kazue Komatsu	Kazue Komatsu	Rina Morita & Shuri	4 February 2026
Ruby reveals she had a hand in manufacturing the Dig Deep! controversy to further her growth, adding she was inspired by Aqua's handling of the Love Now debacle. Aqua is disturbed by Ruby gravitating towards lies and manipulation, as Ruby points out that Ai also lied about her and Aqua's existence to remain an idol. Six months later, Ruby has gained more fame and work, and Shun has since left his job at Dig Deep! to become Ruby's manager. Miyako, MEM-cho, and Kana worry they are holding Ruby back. Aqua finds and questions Ichigo on his reasons for abandoning Miyako and assisting Ruby, where Ichigo admits he is also seeking retribution for Ai's death. Aqua reveals Taiki's information, but Ichigo points out its logical inconsistencies. Realizing his quest for revenge is far from over and that he will never gain closure, Aqua suffers an emotional breakdown and unintentionally harms an assisting Kana in a fit of distress, leaving the latter hurt. The next day, Akane celebrates her acting accomplishments when Kindaichi remarks she reminds him of a former Lalalie actor. Akane later reviews archived rehearsals and notices that former Lalalie actor, Hikaru Kamiki, resembles Aqua. Akane deduces that Hikaru is the true father of Aqua, Taiki, and Ruby, and the mastermind behind Ai's murder.
29	5	"Casting"; Transliteration: "Eigyō" (Japanese: 営業)	Shuichi Sasaki	Daisuke Hiramaki	Haruka Inade & Ayaka Muroga	11 February 2026
While investigating, Akane learns that Hikaru conceived Taiki as a preteen and that he would not be jailed for Ai's murder, as he was a minor during the incident. Knowing that Aqua may resort to violence to avenge Ai, Akane aims to keep him from ever meeting Hikaru. Aqua later asks whether he should live his life free of burden, and Akane reminds him that she will support him. Meanwhile, a depressed Kana ruminates on her worth in the idol industry and her current view of Aqua. When she is invited to meet the esteemed director Masanori Shima, Kana realizes she can return to acting through him, despite his dubious nature, and she establishes a rapport with him. Kana is reminded by Miyako and Shun of the heavy surveillance of idols' movements by paparazzi, especially regarding their interactions with men, so she avoids consulting them about her current work with Shima. Kana accompanies Shima alone to his office to secure a role in his film, but she realizes the gravity of her situation when he seduces her. Although Shima backs off when Kana mentions liking someone, her actions are documented by paparazzi contacted by Kana and Shima's mutual acquaintance.
30	6	"Idols and Relationships"; Transliteration: "Aidoru to Ren'ai" (Japanese: アイドルと恋愛)	Kōki Uchinomiya	Kōki Uchinomiya	Hirono Nishiki & Masaaki Yamano	18 February 2026
Ruby expresses surprise at the number of idols secretly having boyfriends, and she reflects on the industry's stars concealing their relationships to avoid scandals. MEM-cho senses Kana's recent turmoil and turns to Aqua for help, pointing out that Kana became an idol thanks to Aqua's support. On her way home, Kana is approached by the paparazzi, who interrogates her about her relationship with Shima while Miyako receives an email containing files showing Kana with Shima. A distraught Kana runs away, fearing she has endangered B-Komachi with her actions. Kana goes missing, forcing Aqua and MEM-cho to find her. Kana becomes tormented by the thought of betraying her fans' expectations and breaks down under the mounting pressure of being an idol; however, Kana does not let the scandal overwhelm her, proclaiming that she will always stay true to herself. Aqua overhears her venting and is reassured that Kana will handle the scandal with the help of B-Komachi and her other acquaintances, and notes that Kana no longer needs him. Elsewhere, Akane tracks down the location of Hikaru's agency, as a hooded figure observes their tracker.
31	7	"Breakdown"; Transliteration: "Ketsuretsu" (Japanese: 決裂)	Daisuke Hiramaki	Yasuhiro Irie	Shuri, Rina Morita, Haruka Inade, Marumi Sugita, Yoshiko Takemoto & Ayaka Muroga	25 February 2026
Miyako and B-Komachi plan their response to the scandal, as Miyako points out the original target was Shima due to his history of adultery and comments that a bigger scandal can distract people from Kana's situation. Ruby talks to Aqua about how she will do anything they can to help Kana, whereupon Aqua convinces himself that he can suppress the news of Kana's scandal by trading the story of his and Ruby's parentage and its leading to Ai's murder to the paparazzi instead. The story becomes national news, stunning Kana, who was expecting to be condemned for her scandal, and appalling Ruby, as Aqua had not disclosed his intentions to her. Meanwhile, Akane is accidentally pushed off a flight of stairs at a pedestrian overpass by a jogger, and Aqua saves her. Aqua pleads with Akane not to continue her investigation on Hikaru, revealing that he has been tracking Akane's movements since Love Now, and also knows she intended to kill Hikaru. Akane feels betrayed by Aqua using her to learn Hikaru's whereabouts and tearfully tells him he is endangering himself further in his quest for revenge. Aqua acknowledges that his decisions are leading him down a darker path and breaks up with Akane to keep her safe. After leaving, a vengeful and bitter Aqua plots to kill Hikaru alone.
32	8	"Plan"; Transliteration: "Keikaku" (Japanese: 計画)	Kunio Fujii & Daisuke Hiramaki	Hiroaki Yoshikawa	Kimiaki Mizuno	4 March 2026
An infuriated Ruby confronts Aqua on revealing their parentage, and Aqua reasons that the reveal boosts their recognition. Ruby, seeing through his lies, remarks that Aqua no longer cares about Ai and disowns him. Months later, Kana recognizes the story was Aqua's way of protecting her, so she thanks him, then discloses her plans to retire as an idol and asks Aqua to continue supporting her. Aqua later urges Ichigo to help him in an intricate plan to make Hikaru suffer. Meanwhile, Gotanda works with Aqua on a film covering Ai's life titled The 15-Year Lie, as he recalls Ai suggesting he direct a B-Komachi documentary featuring her true self before her murder. The two pitch the film to Kaburagi, who questions its speculative material. After Aqua insists it is based on Ai's accounts and is created by individuals close to Ai, Kaburagi accepts the role of producer and begins preliminary casting. Kaburagi plans to have rising actress Yura Katayose in the role of Ai, while Yura laments to her friend that her fame is being exploited for the film and that she is being cast alongside high schoolers like Ruby. Yura aspires to reach greater heights as an actor, leading her friend, who is revealed to be Hikaru, to murder her during a hiking trip. (Note: As depicted in the post-credits scene of the season 2 finale.) Hikaru then loudly exclaims to Ai that he has killed another rising star.
33	9	"Greed and Passion"; Transliteration: "Haikin to Jōnetsu" (Japanese: 拝金と情熱)	Ichinosuke Akikaze	Hiroaki Yoshikawa	Ayaka Muroga & Hirono Nishiki	11 March 2026
Despite some setbacks, Gotanda and Kaburagi secure funding for the production of The 15-Year Lie, during which Kaburagi shares Yura's sudden unavailability to star in the film. Kaburagi settles on casting Frill as Ai and expresses hope that the film sparks a social phenomenon. Elsewhere, Aqua opens up to Kana and MEM-cho about his breakup with Akane, remarking that he can focus his mind on getting revenge on Hikaru as he is visited by the white-haired girl at Ai's grave. Gotanda reunites with Ruby and witnesses her growing distrust of others after her falling out with Aqua. Gotanda is reminded of Ai, who left him two DVDs meant for the twins when they turned 15, which he remarks as being the catalyst for the film's conception. Seeing their behavioral similarities, Gotanda proposes casting Ruby as Ai in the film, bewildering Aqua and Kaburagi. Frill discusses the complicated casting process with Ruby and challenges her to see who is worthy of auditioning for Ai in The 15-Year Lie based on merit. They are joined by Akane, who is also a lead-role candidate. Realizing that neither Ruby nor Akane is familiar with the film's plot, Frill asks them to improvise a scene involving lying. Akane ponders Ruby's involvement in the challenge, as Frill asks Ruby what lying means to her.
34	10	"Private Audition"; Transliteration: "Kojin-kan Ōdishon" (Japanese: 個人間オーディション)	Kenjirō Okada	Kenjirō Okada	Shuri, Rina Morita & Haruka Inade	18 March 2026
After being asked, Ruby wonders if acting makes her a liar, seeing as she has been playing a role her entire life since being reincarnated. Akane deduces the intention behind the audition and suspects Aqua is involved, noting that he has nothing to lose and is willing to use others to achieve his goal. Frill explains Aqua's reasoning for producing the film, after which Ruby volunteers for the role despite having no acting experience and eventually wins it over Akane. While walking home, Akane and Aqua meet for the first time since their breakup, and Akane vows to stop him if he has ulterior motives behind the film. Kana announces her retirement from B-Komachi and returns to acting, telling Aqua she has been offered the role of Nino, the B-Komachi member who hated Ai. Sometime later, Aqua meets the white-haired girl again, who tells him about the finality of death and how his soul is a rare case of being reincarnated into another body. With all pre-production checks cleared, production of The 15-Year Lie is green-lit, as Gotanda and Kaburagi are introduced to Marina Tendouji, Sarina's mother, and the film's advertisement personnel.
35	11	"The Beginning"; Transliteration: "Sore ga Hajimari" (Japanese: それが始まり)	Shuichi Sasaki, Daisuke Hiramaki & Kazue Momatsu	Yasuhiro Irie, Daisuke Hiramaki & Kazue Momatsu	Kanna Hirayama, Shuri, Ayaka Muroga & Kimiaki Mizuno	25 March 2026
Aqua also meets Marina, where he learns that she has given birth to two kids after Sarina's passing. Ruby becomes increasingly burdened by the film as she recalls her strained relationship with Marina and questions who she is. The white-haired girl then narrates Sarina's past, revealing that Marina abandoned her following the discovery of Sarina's terminal illness at age four. Upon seeing Marina's new family, Ruby tearfully remarks that she brings misery to the people she loves. Aqua realizes Ruby is the reincarnated Sarina, so he reveals himself as Gorou and asks Ruby to live her own life. The twins, now aware of their past lives, reconcile. Ruby develops a brother complex and openly shows affection to Aqua, baffling Kana and MEM-cho. Meanwhile, Miyako wonders how she can adjust Ruby's work schedule to accommodate the film. Miyako reunites with Ichigo by chance, and she rebukes him for leaving her despite Ichigo's promise of renewed success through Strawberry Productions. Miyako brings Ichigo back to the company, and Ichigo shares with Ruby that Aqua planned their reunion. With one week left before filming starts, Ichigo warns Miyako about Aqua's deteriorating mental state, while Akane questions whether the film can fulfill Aqua's desire for revenge. Gotanda voices his worries about finding capable child actors to play young Ruby and Aqua in the film, and Aqua asks the white-haired girl to become an actor, much to the latter's confusion.

== Home media release ==
=== Japanese ===
Kadokawa Corporation (Japan – Region 2/A)
Vol.	Episodes	Cover character(s)	Release date	Ref.
Season 1
1	1	Ai Hoshino	28 June 2023	
2	2–3	Aqua Hoshino	26 July 2023	
3	4–5	Ruby Hoshino	30 August 2023	
4	6–7	Kana Arima	27 September 2023	
5	8–9	Akane Kurokawa	25 October 2023	
6	10–11	MEM-cho	29 November 2023	
Season 2
1	12–14	Kana Arima and Akane Kurokawa	25 October 2024	
2	15–16	Aqua Hoshino and Taiki Himekawa	27 November 2024	
3	17–18	Melt Narushima and Sakuya Kamoshida	25 December 2024	
4	19–20	Abiko Samejima and Yoriko Kichijouji	24 January 2025	
5	21–22	Sumiaki Raida and GOA	26 February 2025	
6	23–24	Ruby Hoshino and MEM-cho	26 March 2025	
Season 3
1	25–28	Ruby Hoshino, Kana Arima and MEM-cho	25 March 2026	
2	29–32	Aqua Hoshino and Akane Kurokawa	24 April 2026	
3	33–35	Gorou Amamiya and Sarina Tendouji	27 May 2026	

=== English ===
Sentai Filmworks (North America – Region 1/A)
Vol.	Episodes	Release date	Ref.
Season 1	1–11	25 June 2024	
Season 2	12–24	6 January 2026	
