= Yuri Yokomizo =

Japanese illustrator and graphic designer known for creating "Sumikko Gurashi."

- よこみぞゆり
- Education: Tama Art University
- Occupations: Illustrator & graphic designer
- Employer: San-X (former)
- Notable work: Sumikko Gurashi
- Website: yokomizoyuri.com

Yuri Yokomizo (よこみぞゆり, Yokomizo Yuri) is a Japanese illustrator and graphic designer who is best known for creating the San-X series 'Sumikko Gurashi'. The series has inspired a popular line of merchandise and has been adapted into video games and critically acclaimed feature films in Japan. After leaving San-X she has worked as a freelance illustrator and has created the Nandemo Ikimono characters.

== Early life ==
As a child, Yuri Yokomizo was a timid student and would often avoid standing out in school. She developed a love for art which had been largely inspired by her affinity for video games, anime, and character goods citing inspiration from popular franchises of her childhood such as Pokémon, Tamagotchi, Afro Ken, and others. As a result, she spent much of her formative years drawing in sketchbooks, making plush toys, designing original characters, and had joined art clubs throughout elementary, junior high, and high school.

During her time in elementary school, she had discovered the popular San-X character, Tarepanda and took interest in the unique design. She took note that the character was created by San-X and began to look further into the company and its other works when she reached junior high. She took up painting and had loved drawing cute animal characters more than she enjoyed drawing humans so she felt the best place for her art would be a character goods company like San-X which became her career aspiration. Yokomizo reached out to an illustrator who would give her advice on designing characters that go beyond their appearance and have strong character to them which is something that stuck with her from then on.

Yokomizo enrolled in Tama Art University in Tokyo and continued working on character designs. After graduation, she began working at character stationery company, San-X in the spring of 2011 at the age of 23.

== San-X and the creation of Sumikko Gurashi ==
In November 2011, Yokomizo would enter an in-house design competition at the company where she would take inspiration for her entry from notebook drawings she had created in the corners of her papers while in university. The characters she had designed for the competition in 2011 were notably more "negative" than typical kawaii-themed characters. One of the designs had been a tapioca pearl that was left behind in a bubble tea cup for being too difficult to drink and the other characters designed for the project had similarly sad backgrounds as well as blank, emotionless expressions. The emotionless expressions were made to allow viewers to project their own emotional connections onto characters. This style of design featuring more negative or apathetic characters, although popular in more recent years with other popular "kawaii" characters like Rilakkuma and Gudetama, was not common during the time and made Yokomizo's designs stand out. Yokomizo had stated the intention was to create characters that would connect with audiences of all ages rather than just children. The characters from her competition entry would go on to become the foundation of Yokomizo's Sumikko Gurashi characters.

In 2012, Sumikko Gurashi debuted and would go on to capture audiences with its themes of outcast and leftover characters who shyly reside in corners where they are most comfortable. The character lineup began with four main characters; Shirokuma, Penguin?, Neko, and Tonkatsu. Three years after the initial release of the line, a final main Sumikko was introduced named, Tokage. The collection of characters also included the Minikko which are smaller side characters who appear alongside the main sumikko from time to time. The popularity of the series amongst children and adults alike has led to many pop-up merchandise shops and themed pop-up restaurants independently as well as alongside Rilakkuma in various locations within Japan and in some countries internationally including Singapore and the United States.

Though she is no longer an employee at San-X, she still works with the company on Sumikko Gurashi related projects.

=== Theatrical films ===
On November 8, 2019, a Sumikko Gurashi theatrical film would premiere in Japan titled, "Sumikko Gurashi the Movie: The Unexpected Picture Book and the Secret Child". The film would open at #3 in Japan during its opening weekend and would go on to win "Best Animation of the Year" at the 29th Annual Japan Movie Critics Awards. The second film, "Sumikko Gurashi the Movie: The Magical Child of the Blue Moonlit Night" would be released in November 2021 and would be similarly well received by audiences and critics. Yokomizo's involvement with both films was limited to providing guidance to the designers with regards to new characters that were introduced to the series through the films. Though she had little input in the rest of production, she did request that the characters not having speaking voices as she felt it was important that they don't. The filmmakers respected this request and in both films the only dialogue is spoken through a narrator.

== Nandemo Ikimono ==
After leaving San-X Yokomizo created the Nandemo Ikimono (Any and All Living Things) series of characters, which include anthropomorphized animals, plants and other items, like Nori Onigiri (Seaweed Rice Ball), Kojima (Little Island) and Dame-Gitsune (Useless Fox). A short anime series with the characters called Gekkan! Nanmono Anime (Monthly! Any and All Things Anime) will begin in April 2025.

== External Resources ==
- Yuri Yokomizo Personal Website and Storefront (in Japanese) (Archived 2024-04-02, accessed 2024-04-24)
- Yuri Yokomizo on Twitter
