= Twins Hinahima =

Japanese anime television film

- Key visual

Japanese name
- Kanji: ツインズひなひま
Transcriptions
- Romanization: Tsuinzu Hinahima
- Created by: KaKa Creation
- Screenplay by: Yū Shinada
- Directed by: Kō Nakano
- Music by: Kujira Yumemi
- Country of origin: Japan
- Original language: Japanese

Production
- Animator: KaKa Technology Studio
- Running time: 24 minutes
- Production companies: KaKa Creation; Twins Hinahima Project

Original release
- Network: Tokyo MX, MBS, BS NTV
- Release: March 28, 2025

Twins Hinahima (Japanese: ツインズひなひま, Hepburn: Tsuinzu Hinahima) is a 2025 Japanese animated television short film produced by Frontier Works and KaKa Creation and animated by KaKa Technology Studio with artificial intelligence (AI) assistance, based on the animated TikTok account of the same name that began in November 2023. It was directed by Kō Nakano from a screenplay written by Yū Shinada, featuring character designs by Takumi Yokota and music by Kujira Yumemi. The film premiered on Tokyo MX on March 28 and on MBS and BS NTV on March 30, 2025. The opening theme song is "Augment Day!" performed by Sae Hiratsuka and Yurie Igoma, while the ending theme song is "6:00 PM" performed by Chico.

== Characters ==
Himari (ひまり)
Voiced by: Sae Hiratsuka
Hinana (ひなな)
Voiced by: Yurie Igoma
