= Sumikko Gurashi =

San-X characters

Various Sumikko Gurashi characters, including Shirokuma, Tokage, Penguin?, Tonkatsu, Neko, and several Minikko

Sumikko Gurashi (すみっコぐらし) is a set of fictional characters created by the Japanese company San-X. The name directly translates to "life in the corner". The main Sumikko characters are Shirokuma, a polar bear who dislikes the cold; Penguin?, who is unsure of being a penguin; Tonkatsu, a piece of leftover pork cutlet; Neko, a timid and anxious cat; and Tokage, a dinosaur who pretends to be a lizard. Minor Minikko characters include Furoshiki, a polka dot furoshiki cloth; Zassou, a weed with a positive attitude; and Tapioca, multi-colored leftover tapioca pearls. The characters were created by Yuri Yokomizo, a graphic designer working for San-X, and the first products were released in 2012. Their main inspiration was the feeling of comfort when one is near a corner, and they were based on Yokomizo's notebook doodles when she was a student.

A wealth of merchandise, such as stationery, plush toys, and clothing, is sold. Books, mobile apps, and video games based on the franchise have also been produced. Four animated films with Sumikko Gurashi were released between 2019 and 2025, with a fifth planned for 2027. Two short anime series aired on Nippon Television in 2023 and 2025. As of 2019, sales of Sumikko Gurashi products were worth about 20 billion yen a year. Eight million plush toys and 3 million books had been sold. In 2019, Sumikko Gurashi won the Grand Prize at the Japan Character Awards.

== Background ==
Targeting Japanese people with an affinity for "corners", such as the corner seat of a café or the corner of a room, the characters are anthropomorphised animals and food items. The characters are split into "Sumikko", the main characters, and "Minikko", the smaller side characters. The main characters have common traits: they have a slightly negative personality, they are castaways in everyday life, and they feel most relaxed when they are near a corner. In contrast, some of the Minikko characters have a more positive outlook, like Zassou, the weed with big dreams.

Yuri Yokomizo was a new designer when she developed the Sumikko Gurashi characters in her first year of joining San-X. Before getting hired at San-X, Yokomizo studied graphic design at Tama Art University where Hikaru Suemasa, creator of the San-X character Tarepanda, was one of her professors. Yokomizo based the Sumikko Gurashi characters on doodles she made in the corners of her notebooks as a student. They were first conceived as a series of cute animal characters, and early concept art included a sheep and a giraffe. The polar bear character Shirokuma was originally conceived as a flawed white rabbit stuffed toy with ears that are too short. It was also considered for a main character role, but ultimately the lone character was deemed too gloomy and lonely, and a group setting was used instead. The cat character Neko was added to the group after winning a survey San-X did with children in elementary school. The addition of the leftover pork cutlet character Tonkatsu shifted the focus. Yokomizo said in 2015 that characters like Tonkatsu and Tapioca were inspired by a feeling of pity for that which is left over. In 2019 Yokomizo said that some parts of the books are based on her own experiences, like a scene where the characters are afraid of answering the phone.

In 2019, The Japan Times described Sumikko Gurashi as being part of a trend which first began with the release of the San-X character Rilakkuma in 2003, where characters have more negative personality traits compared to earlier kawaii (cute) characters which were more cheerful or bland. Marceline Smith, the author of a book about kawaii, described Sumikko Gurashi as "characters that feel left out or anxious" which makes them "more relevant for a generation who face greater uncertainty in their lives".

== History and products ==
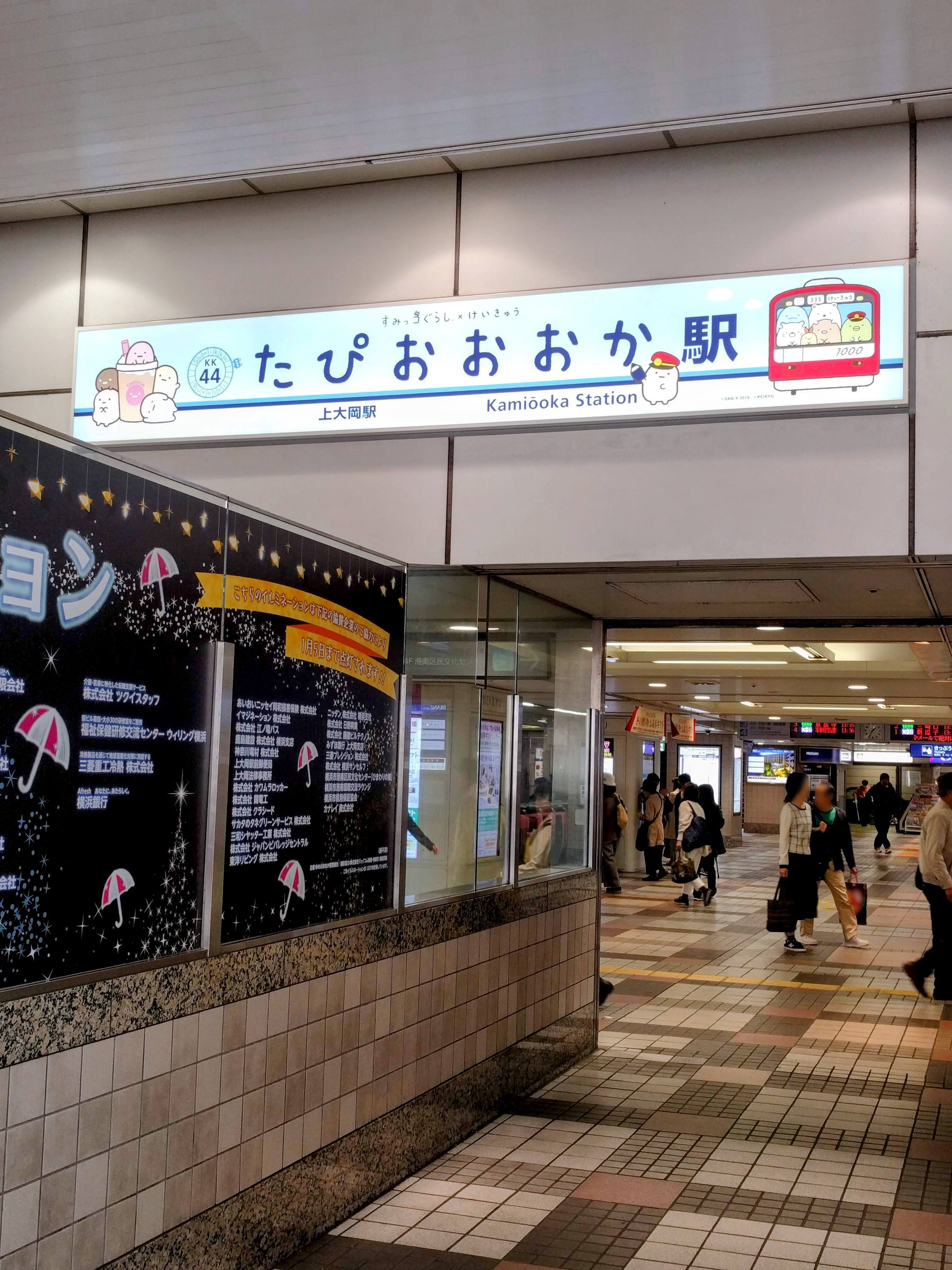
A Sumikko Gurashi themed train station sign on the Keikyū Main Line, as part of 7th anniversary celebrations in 2019

San-X released the first Sumikko Gurashi products in September 2012, which included stationery and plush toys. A variety of merchandise followed, such as clothing, kitchenware, and bags. The Sumikko Gurashi Collection is a series of plush items, consisting of palm-sized plush dolls and plush dollhouses, furniture, outfits, etc. in size for the dolls. As of 2018, it includes over 300 different items. Sumikko merchandise has been released with different themes, like seasonal items, depicting Sumikko wearing hats and mufflers in the winter, or depicting them at a beach holding watermelons in the summer. Other themes show the Sumikko participating in various activities, like studying or sports, or in locations like a cafe or a dagashiya candy store. Some of the themes are reflected in short stories featured in books and magazines, on the San-X website, and in short promotional films with simple animation San-X published on their YouTube channel. As of 2019, San-X had a team of about 25 people working on Sumikko Gurashi product development. As of 2023, 60 different design themes had been released.

For the 5th anniversary in 2017, San-X released birthday-themed merchandise and held different events around Japan, like pop-up cafes and exhibitions. Also, a trains and stations were decorated with Sumikko Gurashi characters in collaboration with the Yamanote Line for the 5th anniversary in 2017, and the Keikyū Main Line for the 7th anniversary in 2019.

Sumikko Gurashi is also promoted in Taiwan and is known as Jiǎoluò Xiǎohuǒbàn (角落小夥伴, lit. "Little Corner Partners") or Jiǎoluò shēngwù (角落生物, lit. "Corner Creatures") in Chinese. In 2017, Sumikko Gurashi merchandise started selling in North American stores such as Books-a-Million and Barnes and Noble.

According to San-X, in 2015, Sumikko Gurashi stood for 30% of sales of their original merchandise or about 5 billion yen. As of 2019, sales of Sumikko products were worth about 20 billion yen a year. Eight million plush toys had been sold. Sumikko Gurashi was ranked #10 in 2016, and #5 in 2018 on character popularity charts from Bandai, based on surveys of parents of children under 12 in Japan. In 2019, Sumikko Gurashi won the Grand Prize at the Japan Character Awards.

The number of supporting characters has grown, and as of 2022 there were 60 different Sumikko Gurashi related characters in total. For the 10th anniversary in 2022, San-x started the "Let's connect through Sumikko project" where the Sumikko characters, among other things, act as tourism ambassadors for selected towns and areas in Japan.

== Media ==
=== Books ===
The first Sumikko Gurashi books were published in 2014, and as of 2018 over 30 different books have been released, including story books, fanbooks, activity books, and mooks with enclosed items. As of 2019, three million books had been sold in total.

Several illustrated story books by Yuri Yokomizo have been published by Shufu to Seikatsu Sha (ja:主婦と生活社) in Japan, beginning in 2014 with the book Sumikko Gurashi: Koko ga Ochitsukun Desu (すみっコぐらし ここがおちつくんです, transl. Sumikko Gurashi: This Is Where I Relax). The book contains profiles of the five main Sumikko characters and several minor Minikko characters. It shows vignettes from their lives in the corner at home and around town, like at a cafe, grocery store, flower shop and park. The book reached an adult audience and sold 250 000 copies. A second book was published in 2016 called Sumikko Gurashi: Kono Mama de Īn Desu (すみっコぐらし このままでいいんです, transl. Sumikko Gurashi: It's Fine Like This). In addition to stories from the corner, this volume introduces Obake the ghost, Tokage's dinosaur mother, and new locations like an Onsen hot spring and a train. Both books contain yonkoma manga along with other styles of manga and illustrated storytelling. A short anime TV series based on the two books began in 2025, named after the first book, it was titled Sumikko Gurashi: This Is Where I Relax (すみっコぐらし ここがおちつくんです, Sumikko Gurashi: Koko ga Ochitsukun Desu).

In 2018 a picture book by Yokomizo was published called Sumikko Gurashi: Sorairo no Mainichi (すみっコぐらし そらいろのまいにち, transl. Sumikko Gurashi: Sky-colored Days). The book tells the backstories of the five main Sumikko characters, and how they ended up in the corner with the other Sumikko. It was published in a Japanese and English bilingual edition in 2024. It was also published as five separate volumes, each telling the story of one of the characters. The book sold 600 000 copies and was adapted to a short anime series with the same title in 2023. A second picture book was published in 2021 called Sumikko Gurashi: Itsu Demo Tonari ni (すみっコぐらし いつでもとなりに, transl. Sumikko Gurashi: Always by My Side). It is focused on Minikko side characters and their friendships with the main Sumikko characters.

=== Games ===
There have been several Nintendo 3DS and Nintendo Switch games, and several mobile games, including Sumikko Gurashi—Our Puzzling Ways and SumiSumi.

==== Nintendo 3DS ====
Four Sumikko Gurashi games were released for the Nintendo 3DS, all developed by Nippon Columbia. As of 2016, 500 000 copies of the games had shipped in total.

Released in 2014 Sumikko Gurashi: Koko ga Ochitsukun desu (すみっコぐらし ここがおちつくんです, transl. Sumikko Gurashi: This Is Where I Relax) is a game where the player lives together with the Sumikko characters, and takes care of them to gather up Genki energy. With the Genki the player can access a Sugoroku style board game and play mini games. It also includes multiplayer and chat features. It received a Famitsu score of 29/40 and sold over 150 000 copies.

Released in 2015 Sumikko Gurashi: Omise Hajimerun desu (すみっコぐらし おみせはじめるんです, transl. Sumikko Gurashi: Starting a Shop) is set in a shōtengai (shopping district) and the player creates shops for the Sumikko characters. It received a Famitsu score of 28/40 and sold over 150 000 copies.

Released in 2016 Sumikko Gurashi: Mura o Tsukurun desu (すみっコぐらし むらをつくるんです, transl. Sumikko Gurashi: Making a Village) is a game where the player creates a farming village for the Sumikko characters. It received a Famitsu score of 30/40 and sold over 145 000 copies.

Released in 2017 Sumikko Gurashi: Koko, Doko Nandesu? (すみっコぐらし ここ、どこなんです？, transl. Sumikko Gurashi: Where Is This?) is set on a wild mysterious island, and the player helps the Sumikko characters explore it. It received a Famitsu score of 29/40 and sold over 45 000 copies.

==== Nintendo Switch ====
Unless otherwise noted, the games for the Nintendo Switch were all developed by Nippon Columbia.

Released in 2017 Sumikko Gurashi: Sumikko Pāku e Yōkoso (すみっコぐらし すみっコパークへようこそ, transl. Sumikko Gurashi: Welcome to Sumikko Park) is a party game centered around a Sugoroku style board game, where players play mini games to earn Sumikko Coins, which can be used to buy items to decorate the game. It received a Famitsu score of 29/40 and sold over 45 000 copies.

Released in 2018 Sumikko Gurashi: Atsumare! Sumikko Taun (すみっコぐらし あつまれ！すみっコタウン, transl. Sumikko Gurashi: Gather! Sumikko Town) is a simulation game where the player creates a town for the Sumikko characters to enjoy. Includes mini games and fortune telling. It received a Famitsu score of 30/40.

Released in 2019 Eiga Sumikko Gurashi: Tobidasu Ehon to Himitsu no Ko Gēmu de Asobō! Ehon no Sekai (映画 すみっコぐらし とびだす絵本とひみつのコ ゲームであそぼう！絵本の世界, transl. Sumikko Gurashi the Movie: The Pop-Up Picture Book and the Secret Child - Play the Game! The World of the Picture Book) is a party game with mini games based on fairy tales like Momotarō, Little Red Riding Hood, and Arabian Nights, where the players gather puzzle pieces to complete jigsaw puzzles. It received a Famitsu score of 28/40 and sold over 25 000 copies.

Released in 2019 Sumikko Gurashi: Gakkō Seikatsu Hajimerun desu (すみっコぐらし 学校生活はじめるんです, transl. Sumikko Gurashi: Begin School Life) is set in an old school, where the player creates classrooms for the Sumikko characters to enjoy. It also includes mini games and fortune telling. It received a Famitsu score of 28/40.

Released in 2020 Sumikko Gurashi: Oheya no Sumi de Tabi Kibun Sugoroku (すみっコぐらし おへやのすみでたびきぶんすごろく, transl. Sumikko Gurashi: Travel Mood Sugoroku in the Corner of the Room) is a party game based on Sugoroku, a type of board game, where up to four players compete in mini games for Tapi Miles. It received a Famitsu score of 29/40.

Released in 2021 Eiga Sumikko Gurashi: Aoi Tsukiyo no Mahō no Ko Gēmu de Asobō! Eiga no Sekai (映画 すみっコぐらし 青い月夜のまほうのコ ゲームであそぼう！ 映画の世界, transl. Sumikko Gurashi The Movie: A Magical Child of the Blue Moonlit Night - Play the Game! The World of the Movie) is a party game for four players with 20 mini games, where players collect pieces to complete jigsaw puzzles. It received a Famitsu score of 30/40.

Released in 2022 Sumikko Gurashi: Minna de Rizumu Pāti (すみっコぐらし みんなでリズムパーティ, transl. Sumikko Gurashi: Everyone's Rhythm Party) is a music game with mini games and both multi-player and single-player modes. It received a Famitsu score of 30/40.

Released in 2023 Eiga Sumikko Gurashi: Tsugihagi Kōjō no Fushigina Ko Gēmu de Asobō! Eiga no Sekai (映画 すみっコぐらし ツギハギ工場のふしぎなコ ゲームであそぼう！ 映画の世界, transl. Sumikko Gurashi The Movie: The Mysterious Child of the Makeshift Factory - Play the Game! The World of the Movie) is a party game for up to four players with 20 mini games, where the players collects pieces to complete jigsaw puzzles. It received a Famitsu score of 29/40.

Planned to be released in 2025 Eiga Sumikko Gurashi: Sora no Ōkoku to Futari no Ko Asobou Kyara Kurosu (映画 すみっコぐらし 空の王国とふたりのコ あそぼうキャラクロス, transl. Sumikko Gurashi the Movie: The Sky Kingdom and the Two Children - Play Character Cross) was developed by Imagineer and Jupiter and includes nonogram and jigsaw puzzles.

Planned to be released in 2025 is Sumikko Gurashi: Tsukurou! Sutekina Sumikko Shima (すみっコぐらし つくろう！ステキなすみっコ島, transl. Sumikko Gurashi: Create! A Wonderful Sumikko Island).

=== Films ===
==== Sumikko Gurashi: Good to Be in The Corner (2019) ====
For the seventh anniversary in 2019, an anime film was released, called Sumikko Gurashi: Good to Be in The Corner (映画すみっコぐらし とびだす絵本とひみつのコ, Eiga Sumikko Gurashi: Tobidasu Ehon to Himitsu no Ko; lit. 'Sumikko Gurashi The Movie: The Pop-up Book and the Secret Child'). The film was produced by the studio Fanworks who previously made the Aggretsuko series. It was directed by Mankyū, with the script written by Takashi Sumita and Kaori Hino was the art director. The film introduces the new bird character Hiyoko? who is lost and unsure of who it is. Hiyoko (ひよこ) means baby bird or chick.

The movie follows the Sumikko Gurashi characters as they get transported into a picture book and find themselves inside various fairy tales. The first is the traditional Japanese fairy tale of Momotarō, where Shirokuma and Tonkatsu appear as the old couple in the story. Inside this fairy tale they come across Hiyoko? a small grey bird, which is not a character traditionally appearing in the story. It turns out to be lost, and Penguin? relates to it and tries to help it.

The Tapioka pull on a string and a trap door opens up, after which the characters are separated into different fairy tales. Shirokuma turns into The Little Match Girl and runs into Hiyoko? inside the world of that fairy tale. Tokage turns into the mermaid in The Little Mermaid with Nisetsumuri as the prince in the story. Penguin? finds itself on a flying carpet inside Arabian Nights, and Tonkatsu turns into the Little Red Riding Hood together with Ebifurai no Shippo.

Shirokuma and Hiyoko? use a sled to jump into the moon, and are transported into the world of The Little Mermaid. Shirokuma and Tokage find each other, but Hiyoko? is taken away to the Arabian Nights story, where it ends up bonding with Penguin? over feeling lost. In the world of the Little Red Riding Hood, Tonkatsu and Ebifurai no Shippo are really happy when the wolf says it will eat them, which ends up scaring the wolf into running away. As they lament being leftover once again, they accidentally sit on a button that sends them to the Arabian Nights world, where they crash into Penguin? and Hiyoko?.

Meanwhile in the world of Momotarō, Neko runs into an Oni, and in trying to escape, frantically digs all through the ground. This ends up destabilizing all the fairy tale worlds, and parts of them start falling into each other. In this jumbled world all the Sumikko are finally reunited. They then find themselves in the story The Ugly Duckling. At first they believe this is where Hiyoko? comes from, but it turns out Hiyoko? is a doodle someone made on the last blank page of the book, and that is why it was all alone.

As they all promise to stay friends with Hiyoko? a hole opens up in sky through which the Sumikko can return to their own world. Hiyoko? cannot leave the world of the book, and they reluctantly end up leaving it behind. Back in their own world, together the Sumikko create a popup house for Hiyoko? and draw pictures of themselves on the blank page so it will not be alone anymore.

The film opened in 114 theaters in Japan in November, ranked #3 on opening weekend, and rose to #2 the week after. It grossed a total of 1.45 billion yen in 2019 and won Best Animation of the Year at the Japanese Movie Critics Awards.

==== Sumikko Gurashi: The Little Wizard in the Blue Moonlight (2021) ====
In 2021, a second movie was released, Sumikko Gurashi: The Little Wizard in the Blue Moonlight (映画 すみっコぐらし 青い月夜のまほうのコ, Eiga Sumikko Gurashi: Aoi Tsukiyo no Mahō no Ko; lit. 'Sumikko Gurashi The Movie: A Magical Child of the Blue Moonlit Night'). It was directed by Takahiro Omori with a screenplay by Reiko Yoshida. Like the first movie, it was produced by Fanworks with art directed by Kaori Hino. The theme song was performed by the alternative rock group Bump of Chicken. Yuri Yokomizo made rough sketches for character designs and collaborated with the movie design team in creating the concept. Much of the work on the movie was done remotely, using screen sharing. The film revolves around the new character Five (ふぁいぶ, faibu) who is the smallest of a group of wizards, and not very good at magic.

The plot of the film takes place in the fall. The Sumikko go on a camping trip to the Sumikko lake where the mysterious lake creature Sumisshi lives. Sumisshi is a dinosaur and Tokage's mother, but that is kept secret from the other Sumikko. They end up never meeting Sumisshi.

Back home, the Sumikko are outside looking at the moon, when a group of wizards arrive from the sky in a magic glowing boat. The wizards do magic tricks and hold a party. The Sumikko dance and play badminton in the sky with the wizards. The smallest wizard, named Five, tries to help out, but things keep going wrong, like instead of a donut a tire appears.

As the wizards leave, they make a mistake and leave Five behind. Tokage invites Five to its house in a tree in the woods, and hides its mementos of Sumisshi in a chest. Five learns about the Sumikko world and partakes in activities, but still cries, missing the other wizards.

The Sumikko explain to Five what dreams are, and share their own dreams. Neko dreams of becoming thin, Shirokuma of feeling warm, and Tonkatsu of being eaten. Penguin dreams of figuring out if it is a kappa or penguin or what. Five tries to do magic to make their dreams come true, but it turns out wrong and the magic is undone.

At night Five learns how to use magic to make things disappear, and uses the magic on the Sumikko while they are asleep. When they wake up they are all changed: Shirokuma feels too hot and is using a fan, Neko keeps eating, Penguin and Tonkatsu act listless and aimless. Five confesses to making everyone's dreams disappear and apologizes, but cannot undo the magic.

The Sumikko try to jolt everyone's memories of what their dreams were. A tropical island display makes Shirokuma remember, a slim portrait makes Neko remember, being put on a plate with garnish makes Tonkatsu remember, and a plate cracking makes Penguin? remember it has memories of a plate on its head like a kappa. Five knocks over the chest with mementos, and accidentally finds out that Tokage's dream is to meet Sumisshi.

As Tokage and Five wistfully look up at the stars together, the group of wizards returns from the sky in their magic ship. As thanks for Five staying with Tokage, the wizards make Tokage and the other Sumikko able to fly, and they all fly to the Sumikko lake. Sumisshi comes out of the lake, and the wizards give Sumisshi wings to fly together with Tokage.

The wizards leave together with Five, and back in the wizard world, Five is practicing magic, and writes that its dream is to create new magic.

The film opened in 184 theaters and was #2 at the weekend box office, going up to #1 the week after. As of January 2022, the total box office was over 1 billion yen.

==== Sumikko Gurashi: The Patched-Up Factory in the Woods (2023) ====
A third film was released in 2023, called Sumikko Gurashi: The Patched-Up Factory in the Woods (映画 すみっコぐらし ツギハギ工場のふしぎなコ, Eiga Sumikko Gurashi: Tsugihagi Kōjō no Fushigina Ko; lit. 'Sumikko Gurashi The Movie: The Mysterious Child of the Makeshift Factory'). The film is produced at Fanworks, like the first two films, and staff includes director Hazumu Sakuta, the same writer as the first film, Takashi Sumita, and from the first two films, the same art director, Kaori Hino, and the same narrators, Yoshihiko Inohara and Manami Honjō. The film earned over 240 million yen in three days after opening.

==== Sumikko Gurashi: The Sky Kingdom and the Two Children (2025) ====
A fourth film is planned to release October 2025, titled Sumikko Gurashi: The Sky Kingdom and the Two Children (映画 すみっコぐらし 空の王国とふたりのコ, Eiga Sumikko Gurashi: Sora no Ōkoku to Futari no Ko). The film was produced at studio Fanworks, directed by Naomi Iwata, with the same script writer, Takashi Sumita, and art director Kaori Hino, as previous films.

=== TV series ===
To coincide with the release of the third movie, in 2023 a five minutes per episode five episodes TV anime aired on Nippon Television, titled Sumikko Gurashi: Sky-colored Days (すみっコぐらし そらいろのまいにち, Sumikko Gurashi: Sorairo no Mainichi). It was based on a book from 2018 with the same title by Sumikko creator Yuri Yokomizo. Like the book, the series tells the backstories of the five main Sumikko characters, and how they ended up in the corner with the other Sumikko. The series was written by Reiko Yoshida and directed by Hazumu Sakuta, who also directed several of the Sumikko Gurashi theatrical films. The girl group Perfume provided narration for the series together with Manami Honjō, who also did narration for the films. Like the films, the series was produced at the studio Fanworks.

A series of anime shorts began in April 2025 called Sumikko Gurashi: This Is Where I Relax (すみっコぐらし ここがおちつくんです, Sumikko Gurashi: Koko ga Ochitsukun Desu). Airing on Nippon Television's ZIP! morning show, as part of their ZIP! 1-Minute Anime segment, each episode is one minute long. The series is also streamed on TVer and YouTube. It was based on two books by Yuri Yokomizo, one with the same title as the series, and the other titled Sumikko Gurashi: Kono Mama de Īn Desu (すみっコぐらし このままでいいんです, transl. Sumikko Gurashi: It's Fine Like This). The series was produced at Fanworks and directed by Gaku Kinoshita (ja:きのしたがく) with narration by the actress Nao.

== Characters ==
=== Sumikko ===
- Shirokuma (しろくま shirokuma) is a shy polar bear who ran away from the Arctic Circle. It is sensitive to the cold and feels most at home while drinking hot tea in the corner. It likes to draw and bathe in hot springs and has an easygoing personality. Furoshiki, the pink cloth with cream-yellow polka dots, is its most prized possession. It heard from the traveling Penguin (Real) that there were warm seas in the south, so it ran away from the polar region and ended up in the corner with the other Sumikko. Shirokuma was originally a white rabbit in an early concept sketch.
- Penguin? (ぺんぎん？ pengin?) resembles a green penguin, but is unsure if it really is one. It likes eating cucumbers and has vague memories of having a plate on its head (both of which strongly imply that it is a kappa). Since it uses sneaky ways to take the corner for itself, the Arm often picks it up and away. It likes to read and listen to music. In early concept sketches, it was portrayed as a penguin who sunbathes until it turns green from moss growing on it.
- Tonkatsu (とんかつ tonkatsu) is an edge slice from a fried pork cutlet. It is composed of 1% meat and 99% fat, so it was left behind on its plate after the meal finished. It often puts condiments like sauce, salt, and mustard on itself to assert that it is still edible. Despite being food, it can eat from its mouth, which makes up its 1% portion of meat. Since it is covered with batter, it refries itself instead of bathing. It likes to hang out with Ebifurai no Shippo, the fried shrimp tail.
- Neko (ねこ neko) is a timid and socially anxious calico cat. It is self-conscious about its rotundity. It often gives the corner away to other Sumikko because of its personality. It feels safe when snugly covered, like in a pouch or under an empty cat food can. It often files its nails on the walls of the corner. It has a wallet and acts as the treasurer of the group. Its favorite foods are rice balls, cat grass, canned cat food, and fish. It does not like mandarins because it mistakes their sour smell as a sign of rotting. It briefly reunited with two estranged siblings in a 2019 theme.
- Tokage (とかげ tokage) is an aquatic dinosaur who poses as a lizard to avoid being captured. It was separated from its mother, but they later reunited. It is friends with Nisetsumuri, the fake snail, and Tokage (Real), who is an actual lizard. Its favorite food is fish, so it associates with Neko. It occasionally dives for fresh fish for Neko. Tokage was not part of the original 2012 lineup of characters but was added after about three years.

=== Minikko ===
These are the smaller Minikko characters.

- Furoshiki (ふろしき furoshiki) is Shirokuma's pink furoshiki cloth with cream-colored spots. Shirokuma often uses it to claim a corner spot, as a blanket, and in many other ways.
- Zassou (ざっそう zassō) is a shrub of weed that has big dreams and a positive attitude. Its dream is to be used in a bouquet at a flower shop one day. Because Neko waters it often, it is the closest with it.
- Ebifurai No Shippo (えびふらいのしっぽ ebifurai no shippo) is the leftover tail of a fried shrimp. Because of their similar past, it is good friends with Tonkatsu. Like Tonkatsu, it refries itself instead of taking baths and likes to apply tartar sauce to itself or hold a cherry tomato.
- Nisetsumuri (にせつむり nisetsumuri) is a slug who carries a shell on its back and pretends to be a snail. Because of its guilt over its dishonesty, it apologizes more than necessary. Because of their similar false identity, it is closest friends with Tokage.
- Obake (おばけ obake) is a timid ghost that likes funny things but avoids laughing to avoid scaring people with its big mouth. It lives in a corner of the attic and likes to clean, and is also seen working part-time at the Kissa Sumikko (喫茶すみっコ kissasumikko) (corner cafe).
- Tapioca (たぴおか tapioca) are tapioca pearls left over from a cup of milk tea. When they were still floating in the milk tea, they were smiling, but now their expression is emotionless. They come in pastel yellow, blue, and pink, as well as black. The rarer black Tapioca are more mischievous than the others. One of the yellow Tapioca is friends with Penguin?
- Hokori (ほこり hokori) are wisps of dust accumulated in the corner. As with the Tapioca, there are multiple Hokori, but they can also combine and dissipate. They are weak against water.
- Suzume (すずめ suzume) is a sparrow that flies by to nibble on Tonkatsu's crumbs.
- Fukuro (ふくろう fukurō) is a nocturnal owl who keeps trying its best to stay up in the daytime.

=== Other ===
- Arm (アーム āmu) is a robot arm similar to that of a UFO catcher. It occasionally appears to snatch Sumikko (Penguin? being its favorite catch), who attempts to steal the corner with illegitimate means. On one hand, it is feared by the Sumikko, but on the other hand, sometimes it takes care of their well-being.
- Yama (やま yama) is a small, conical, white-and-blue mountain that admires Mount Fuji. It appears at hot springs, standing in for the paintings of Mt. Fuji one often sees at a Sentō. It turns red when entering hot springs.
- Mogura (もぐら mogura) is a grey mole that used to live in a corner underground. Because of the commotion above ground, it became curious about it and surfaced for the first time. Likes to wear red boots.
- Penguin (Real) (ぺんぎん（本物）pengin (honmono)) is a friendly and approachable penguin who travels around the world. It informed Shirokuma of warmer regions in the south. It shared its souvenirs with the Sumikko, such as rock salt, pearls, and photographs, which it stores in a blue and white striped furoshiki cloth.
- Sumi-ssie (スミッシー sumisshī, derived from ネッシー nesshī meaning "Nessie") is a long-necked creature that appeared in Sumik-ko (corner lake) (すみっ湖 sumikko, punning on -湖 -ko, a suffix for lake names). She is Tokage's long-lost mother, and a very gentle dinosaur, who came from the sea to visit Tokage. Since the other Sumikko do not know that Tokage is a dinosaur, they have not realized that Sumi-ssie is its mother.
- Tokage (Real) (とかげ（本物） tokage (honmono)) is a real lizard who lives in the forest. It is a friend of Tokage who has a carefree personality and doesn't care about the details.
- Mamemaster (まめマスター mamemasutaa) is a black coffee bean who is the master at the Kissa Sumikko cafe where Obake works.
- Sumigamisama (すみ神様 sumigamisama) is the God of Sumikko and is always watching them from somewhere. It is said that he appears once every five years. He has spent many years training in the corner and is now perfectly corner-shaped.
- Wata (わた wata) is a special piece of cotton batting from inside Tokage's treasured stuffed toy.
