= Japan Character Awards =

Awards

Japan Character Awards 日本キャラクター大賞
- Awarded for: Characters
- Country: Japan
- First award: 2009
- Website: www.charabiz.com/award/index.html

Japan Character Awards (日本キャラクター大賞, Japan Character Awards) were established in 2009 to celebrate the best licensed brands and characters in Japan. The ceremony is organized by the Character Brand Licensing Association and supported by Japan's Ministry of Economy, Trade and Industry.

== Recipients ==
Year	Grand Prize
2009	Pokémon
2010	One Piece
2011	Kobito-Zukan
2012	One Piece
2013	Kumamon
2014	Funassyi
2015	Yo-Kai watch
2016	Osomatsu-san
2017	Pokémon
2018	Despicable Me
2019	Sumikko Gurashi
2020	Demon Slayer: Kimetsu no Yaiba
2021	Demon Slayer: Kimetsu no Yaiba – The Movie: Mugen Train
2022	Chiikawa
2023	One Piece
2024	Chiikawa
2025	Chiikawa
