= Yurie Igoma =

Japanese voice actress (born 1999)

- 伊駒 ゆりえ
- Born: February 24, 1999 (age 27); Tochigi Prefecture, Japan
- Occupation: Voice actress
- Years active: 2021–present
- Agent: 81 Produce
- Known for: Oshi no Ko as Ruby Hoshino; BanG Dream! as Mahoro Hamasaki

Yurie Igoma (伊駒 ゆりえ, Igoma Yurie; born February 24, 1999) is a Japanese voice actress who is affiliated with 81 Produce. She started her career in 2021, and in 2023 she played her first main role as Ruby Hoshino in the anime television series Oshi no Ko.

== Biography ==
Igoma was born in Tochigi Prefecture. She first became interested in acting when she was in the second grade of elementary, after she watched a play held by students from the sixth grade. She wanted to perform as well when she reached the sixth grade, and when she was able to do so, she realized that acting was fun to her. It was at this point she became interested in pursuing an acting-related job when she got older. Another inspiration was her love of Disney works, which was strengthened by yearly family trips to Tokyo Disneyland. It was to the point that she considered Mickey Mouse as a mentor and Walt Disney as someone she respected.

As a result of her love for Disney works, Igoma eventually decided on pursuing a career as a voice actress. She applied for admission at a vocational school three days after making her decision. She was able to pay for her own tuition from salaries she made with a part-time job. Following an on-campus audition, Igoma became affiliated with 81 Produce, starting her career in 2021.

Igoma's first main role was as Ruby Hoshino in the anime television series Oshi no Ko. It was the first anime she had ever auditioned for; in particular, she wanted to play Ruby as she was a fan of the original manga series. During the audition Aka Akasaka, the manga's author, and others told her that "the real Ruby had arrived". In addition to voicing Ruby, she also performs songs in-character as part of the in-series idol group B-Komachi.

In April 2023, Igoma began hosting a weekly radio show on the Nippon Cultural Broadcasting network, serving as one of the hosts of A&G NEXT STEP HOOOOPE!.

In March 2024, Igoma was one of the recipients of the Best New Actor Award at the 18th Seiyu Awards.

== Filmography ==
=== Anime ===
2022

- Duel Masters King Max – Student B
- Shikimori's Not Just a Cutie – Shopper
- Megaton Musashi – Operator

2023

- Oshi no Ko – Ruby Hoshino

2024

- Umamusume: Pretty Derby – Beginning of a New Era – Shima

2025

- The 100 Girlfriends Who Really, Really, Really, Really, Really Love You 2nd Season – Newbie Idol
- Twins Hinahima – Hinana
- Watari-kun's ****** Is About to Collapse – Yukari Ishihara

2026

- Marika's Love Meter Malfunction – Kokona Mikasa
- Yowayowa Sensei – Mizuki Mukubayashi

=== Video games ===
2024

- Azur Lane – USS Halford
- Lilja to Natsuka no Junpaku na Uso – Natsuka Utsugi
- D4DJ – Eimi Azai
- The Idolmaster Shiny Colors – Ruby Hoshino

2026

- BanG Dream! Our Notes – Mahoro Hamasaki
- Nekopara: Sekai Connect – Natsume
