= To a Kinder World =

- Dandadan episode
- A still from the episode, featuring the character Acrobatic Silky
- Episode no.: Season 1 Episode 7
- Directed by: Kōtarō Matsunaga
- Written by: Hiroshi Seko
- Original air date: November 15, 2024
- Running time: 23 minutes

Episode chronology
← Previous "A Dangerous Woman Arrives"	Next → "I've Got This Funny Feeling"

"To a Kinder World" (Japanese: 優しい世界へ, Hepburn: Yasashii Sekai e) is the seventh overall episode of the anime television series Dandadan, an adaptation of the manga series Dandadan by Yukinobu Tatsu. The series follows a psychic girl named Momo Ayase and a boy with supernatural powers named Ken "Okarun" Takakura who are on a quest to find Okarun's balls. His balls were taken and lost after he became possessed by a Japanese spirit called a yōkai named Turbo Granny, who reluctantly helps their search in exchange for Okarun returning his supernatural powers to her. In the preceding episode, Momo and Okarun battle a yōkai named Acrobatic Silky to protect a girl named Aira Shiratori, who Silky believes is her daughter. The fight is concluded in "To a Kinder World", which centers around the history of Silky before she became a spirit, as well as explaining her attachment to Aira.

The episode was produced by Science Saru, with Kōtarō Matsunaga as episode director, Shūto Enomoto as storyboard and animation director, and Hiroshi Seko as writer. Changes were made from the manga version of the story, including how Silky is portrayed when Aira first meets her as a child. Greater focus was put on Silky's memories than in the manga, with staff remarking about the difficulty of creating these scenes. The episode premiered on November 15, 2024, and was released shortly thereafter on streaming platforms internationally.

The episode has been met with critical acclaim, with critics considering it the best episode of Dandadan and one of the best episodes of the year. It was praised for its animation and use of colors, and the scene depicting the memories of Acrobatic Silky, particularly what befell her and her daughter, was considered the highlight of the episode.

== Background ==
Dandadan follows multiple characters, including the two main characters, a psychic girl named Momo Ayase and a boy with supernatural powers named Ken "Okarun" Takakura. Momo, a believer in spirits, makes a bet with Okarun, a believer in extraterrestrial life, and they each try to prove that the other's belief is wrong, leading to Momo being abducted by aliens and Okarun possessed by a Japanese spirit called a yōkai named Turbo Granny, who stole his penis. She manages to break free from the aliens after discovering her psychic abilities, and eventually, the two defeat Turbo Granny with the help of Momo's grandmother, Seiko. They later discover that, after getting his penis back, Turbo Granny hid inside of him and stole his balls before losing them. After excising her from him and putting her into a maneki neko doll, they agree to work together to find his balls in exchange for Okarun returning her powers to Turbo Granny once they find his balls.

== Plot ==
The preceding episode, "A Dangerous Woman Arrives", features the character Aira Shiratori accosted by a yōkai named Acrobatic Silky, who believes Aira to be her daughter and attacks Momo Ayase and Okarun with her hair in a warehouse. She attempts to eat the three, but is forced to remove them after Momo lights a fire in her stomach. "To a Kinder World" opens from the point of view of a woman running in the street, sounding distressed, and then cutting back to Silky's point of view in the warehouse. She accuses Momo and Okarun of taking Aira from her, using her hair to chase them through the warehouse.

Silky attempts to eat Aira to become one with her but finds her hair has become tangled in the environment. Momo restrains Silky, but she breaks free by tearing her own hair out and attacks Momo. Okarun defends her, ending the fight. They then attempt resuscitation on Aira after discovering that she died. Silky offers to sacrifice her aura to revive her, which Momo uses her psychic powers to connect Silky's aura to Aira's, causing her to witness Silky's memories. She learns that Silky, as a human, was an indebted single mother who did sex work and other jobs to keep her and her daughter afloat. Unable to pay off her debt, she was attacked by loan sharks, who severely injured her and abducted her daughter. After failing to save her, Silky performed a ballet on a rooftop before jumping to her death. Now a wandering spirit, she mistakes a young Aira for her daughter after Aira mistakes her for her own mother who had died, leading her to become a yōkai to protect her.

Aira comes back to life once Silky's aura is transferred, Momo learns from Turbo Granny, a yōkai ally, that since Silky lost her aura and will leave behind regrets, she will be forgotten by the living and the dead. As a disintegrating Silky expresses how bad a mother she was, Aira embraces her, calling her mommy. She expresses her love for Silky, hoping that she and her daughter will be sent to a kinder world and promising to never forget her.

== Voice cast ==
Momo Ayase (綾瀬 桃, Ayase Momo)
Voiced by: Shion Wakayama (Japanese); Abby Trott (English)
Ken Takakura (高倉 健, Takakura Ken) / Okarun (オカルン)
Voiced by: Natsuki Hanae (Japanese); A.J. Beckles (English)
Turbo Granny (ターボババア, Tābo Babā)
Voiced by: Mayumi Tanaka (Japanese); Barbara Goodson (English)
Aira Shiratori (白鳥 愛羅, Shiratori Aira)
Voiced by: Ayane Sakura (Japanese); Lisa Reimold (English)
Acrobatic Silky (アクロバティックさらさら, Akurobatikku Sarasara)
Voiced by: Kikuko Inoue (Japanese); Amber Lee Connors (English)
Acrobatic Silky's daughter
Voiced by: Hina Kino (Japanese); Brittany Lauda (English)

== Production and broadcast ==
Japanese voice actress Kikuko Inoue spoke of an experience where she feared for her own daughter's life, which inspired her performance as Acrobatic Silky, particularly her breathing.

"To a Kinder World", like all episodes of Dandadan, was produced by animation studio Science Saru and an adaptation of the manga series of the same name by Yukinobu Tatsu. The episode were directed by Kōtarō Matsunaga and written by Hiroshi Seko, and the music was composed by Kensuke Ushio. The storyboard and animation was directed by Shūto Enomoto, in his debut as a storyboard director. Enomoto's animation work was primarily centered on Acrobatic Silky and Aira, working in tandem with Matsunaga. When compared to the manga, the episode put more focus on Silky's memories, with Fūga Yamashiro making her the main focus of the episode. Enomoto stated that he created the storyboards with Yamashiro's ideas in mind, but had difficulty executing them. Matsunaga agreed, citing the Silky point-of-view scene as particularly difficult. Enomoto created a 3D layout of this part.

When designing the fight between Silky, Okarun, and Momo, Enomoto wanted to illustrate Silky as "imprisoned by her own hair", spending the entirety of the production storyboarding and figuring out which animators should work on which task. Artist Kana Itō was responsible for illustrating the final scene between Silky and Aira. Enomoto, having picked her to animate it while creating the storyboard, stated that the first illustration was perfect. Other scenes, including her hair attacks at the beginning of the episode, her hair-pulling scene, and cardiac scene, were illustrated by Jura, Genta Ishimori and Kana Okutani, respectively. The first five minutes of the episode are an adaptation of chapter 15 of the manga, where Silky's backstory is depicted in 11 comic pages, compared to 10 minutes of the anime, which has additional and elongated scenes. The scene of Silky meeting Aira as a child was changed to have Silky look more similar to her human form instead of her yōkai form as in the manga.

Kikuko Inoue, Acrobatic Silky's Japanese voice actress, stated in an interview that she channeled an incident that occurred 20 years prior when she left her six-year-old daughter unattended in a pool briefly, running at full speed back after realizing how unsafe her daughter was. She described her breathing on the way back as half-crying, noting how terrified she was that her daughter may drown. Inoue stated that she related to the confusion and fear that Silky experienced chasing after her daughter's kidnappers, putting her own experiences into Silky's breathing during this scene.

"To a Kinder World" was first broadcast on MBS, TBS and other JNN stations as part of the Super Animeism Turbo broadcast block on November 15, 2024. It was also released on the ABEMA Anime Channel, Netflix, Hulu, and Crunchyroll.

== Reception ==
The anime's adaptation of the original chapter was highly anticipated by fans, according to Anime News Network. Upon release, "To a Kinder World" received critical acclaim, considered the best episode of the first season by Comics Gaming Magazine writer Ridge Herripersad. It was also considered as one of the best episodes of the year by Anime Corner writer Jay Gibbs, who considered it one of the most impressive episodes of an anime he had seen. Dengeki Online writer Kawachi felt that, despite how moving he found the original manga version, the episode exceeded his expectations. He noted that he felt sad, questioning how impactful it would be for parents. James Beckett, writing for Anime News Network, re-read the manga chapter to get ready for the adaptation but was taken off guard by how emotional it was. He praised Matsunaga and Enomoto for making one of the "finest pieces of animated artistry" he has seen in a long time, calling it a "perfect episode of television". He also praised the scene of Aira hugging Silky, feeling that it made her a hero on par with the protagonists by showing the power of compassion.

Gibbs commended the implementation of the point-of-view scene with Silky, arguing that the desperation behind the scene humanized her and made the fight with Silky feel less like it was with a "spirit meddling with human affairs". He felt that the director's goal of reminding people that yōkai used to be humans was accomplished well here. He also appreciated a specific change from the manga, where Silky is portrayed as looking more human until she meets Aira. He believed that this depicted her becoming a yōkai from a "warped desire to protect Aira", in a transitionary period between her death and transformation. Real Sound writer Hotaka Sugimoto praised the episode's pacing and ability to display both gags and tragedy. He felt that it was particularly outstanding for the series, commenting on how detailed Silky's memory was. Sugimoto believed the creators wanted it to feel as though something that could happen in real life. He compared it to the film The Colors Within, also by Science Saru, stating that Enomoto emphasized how beautiful Silky was before becoming an evil spirit and how that beauty never left.

=== Audio and visuals ===
The visuals of the episode received acclaim as well. Anime News Network writer James Beckett found the first half of the episode "funny, thrilling, and spectacularly animated", commending to how its neon pink lighting "perfectly highlights" the setting. He also highlighted the visuals of Silky's memories, stating that it uses "careful, naturalistic drawings" with the "painstaking cinematography and haunting music to give us a movie-in-miniature that is impossible to look away from". Dengeki Online writer Kawachi praised the art, commenting that the action looked interesting and that the combat in the anime version looked more impressive than the manga version to him due to the use of long-distance shots to emphasize Silky's hair. He also appreciated that the animators came up with new scenes for Silky that did not change the development or direction of the manga plot. Anime Corner writer Jay Gibbs felt that the choreography and animation were high quality, complimenting the action, particularly the way Silky uses her hair in combat. He also felt the flashback was beautifully handled, enhanced from the manga depiction. He appreciated the way that light and sound were used to contrast her low points from her high points, CGMagazine writer Ridge Harripersad also gave praise to the flashback depiction and Science Saru's skill, particularly the use of lighter borders during happy memories in the flashback.

Real Sound writer Hotaka Sugimoto stated that there was skepticism as to whether the anime could do justice to the artistry of the manga, adding that only a top-level animation studio could handle it. He commended Science Saru for making visuals as dense as the original, noting that the episode garnered acclaim worldwide. He believed that episode 7 demonstrated their skills more than earlier episodes, commending the work in the depiction of Silky's death. He compared the scene's art to The Colors Within, stating that its use of colors emphasized the beauty of her soul. He noted that Aira and Silky both incorporate pink, believing that the color of their auras connected them. Sugimoto felt that the manga could not depict what the anime does. The sound design for the episode received acclaim from critics. Anime Corner writer Jay Gibbs called Inoue a "fantastic" voice actor, citing her performance in the beginning of the episode. He felt that being able to convey "such a strong feeling of desperation" without dialogue was proof of extraordinary acting ability. He also highlighted the music during the flashback scene, stating that the piano conveyed an "intriguing mixture of melancholy and joy" that conveyed "remembering something precious but fleeting". Dengeki Online writer Kawachi also complimented Inoue's performance, stating that she portrays Silky as both a scary monster and a loving mother. He commented on the use of music used in Silky's final moments, saying that it combined with Silky's movements to create a scene that was beautiful and tragic.
