= Let's Go to the Cursed House =

- Dandadan episode
- A screenshot of the Kito family secretly observing the protagonists
- Episode no.: Season 1 Episode 12
- Directed by: Tetsuya Wakano
- Written by: Hiroshi Seko
- Original air date: December 20, 2024
- Running time: 23 minutes

Episode chronology
← Previous "First Love"	Next → "Like, This Is the Legend of the Giant Snake"

"Let's Go to the Cursed House" (Japanese: 呪いの家へレッツゴー, Hepburn: Noroi no Ie e Rettsu Gō) is the twelfth overall episode of the anime television series Dandadan, an adaptation of the manga series Dandadan by Yukinobu Tatsu. It is also the finale of the series' first season. It stars Momo Ayase, a girl with psychic powers, and Ken "Okarun" Takakura, a boy possessed by the yokai Turbo Granny, as they search for a golden ball that was taken from him and later lost by Turbo Granny. The two go to the house of another boy named Jin "Jiji" Enjоji, whose parents were hospitalized and he himself haunted by a spirit. The episode adapts content from chapters 33 and 34 of the manga, expanding upon an assault on Momo by men in a bath house.

"Let's Go to the Cursed House" has received mixed reception. While some critics felt it was a good finale to the season, criticism was levied against its cliffhanger ending, particularly with the execution of Momo's assault. Critics stated that it was more pronounced than in the manga, with The Mary Sue writer Kirsten Carey bemoaning the use of sexual assault as a plot driver in Dandadan. Despite this criticism, multiple critics argued that since Dandadan was a "coming-of-age" story, the presence of sexuality made sense.

== Plot ==
In the previous episode, "First Love," Momo Ayase is reunited with her childhood friend and first love, Jin "Jiji" Enjоji, when he comes to stay at Granny Seiko Ayase's house due to his parents being hospitalized. He later clarifies that his home is haunted by an evil spirit, which caused his parents' illness and the deaths of multiple exorcists, and he came to Seiko for her spiritual power. He also speaks of being haunted by a specific entity himself. Seiko assigns this duty to Momo due to her powers being location-bound. Momo's friend Ken "Okarun" Takakura, meanwhile, is training to be better equipped to protect her, and becomes jealous by her camaraderie with Jiji. During this, a living anatomical doll named Taro begins running past them. Momo notices that he appears to have a shining ball, believing it to be one of the golden balls Okarun lost. Okarun gives chase, using the powers granted to him by a yokai named Turbo Granny, and they eventually find the mannequin digging through the trash to find his love, another anatomical doll named Hana. Taro professing his love to Hana provides clarity to Okarun about his feelings for Momo.

In "Let's Go to the Cursed House," Momo, Okarun, and Jiji convince Seiko to allow Hana to stay at her house, with Taro agreeing to stay in the science classroom he was in as long as he can visit her at night. They also discover that the golden ball was actually an ornament. During the night, Momo stays up with Hana while they wait for Taro, not knowing that he was hit by a truck on the way there, arriving by the morning due to having to reassemble himself. Momo, Okarun, and Jiji eventually go on a trip back to Jiji's house by train; during the trip, Okarun tries to keep Momo's attention on him, only to feel one-upped by Jiji. At one point, his mention of kappas intrigues Jiji, who begins excitedly talking about things like Nessie and calling Okarun a friend. They arrive at the house, and while entering, are unknowingly being spied on by a group of people called the Kito family.

Momo struggles to find the spirit in the house, guessing that it may be hiding. She goes to the hot spring, leaving Okarun alone with Jiji, who plays soccer with him. While they play together, the two try to one-up each other with things they like about Momo. Jiji then puts him in a choke hold to make him admit defeat, and Okarun notices that there is a part of the house's structure that makes no sense. While Momo is enjoying the hot spring, a group of older men enter, informing her that this is a mixed bath. One of the men blocks Momo from leaving, stating that gators like to target women in hot springs. They then begin creeping up to her. She attempts to escape, but due to her lightheadedness, they are able to push her under the water. Back at the house, Okarun and Jiji use a sledgehammer to break a wall inside the house, finding a secret room covered in talismans.

== Voice cast ==
Momo Ayase (綾瀬 桃, Ayase Momo)
Voiced by: Shion Wakayama (Japanese); Abby Trott (English)
Ken Takakura (高倉 健, Takakura Ken) / Okarun (オカルン)
Voiced by: Natsuki Hanae (Japanese); A.J. Beckles (English)
Jin Enjoji (円城寺 仁, Enjōji Jin)
Voiced by: Kaito Ishikawa (Japanese); Aleks Le (English)
Turbo Granny (ターボババア, Tābo Babā)
Voiced by: Mayumi Tanaka (Japanese); Barbara Goodson (English)
Seiko Ayase (綾瀬 星子, Ayase Seiko)
Voiced by: Nana Mizuki (Japanese); Kari Wahlgren (English)

== Production and broadcast ==
"Let's Go to the Cursed House," like all episodes of Dandadan, was produced by animation studio Science Saru and an adaptation of the manga series of the same name by Yukinobu Tatsu. It is the 12th and final episode of Dandadan's first season. This episode was directed by Tetsuya Wakano, its script was written by Hiroshi Seko, and its storyboard drawn by Hiromi Nishiyama. Episode 12 is an adaptation of parts of chapters 33 and 34 from the manga. In their adaptation, the scene of Momo being assaulted was added before the scene of Okarun and Jiji discovering the secret room. The assault was also elongated and left on a cliffhanger, with the scene in the manga resolved quickly and in the same chapter. According to Okarun's actor, Natsuki Hanae, the director stated that there was no other place to end the episode. The music in the hot springs was designed to have a family-like vibe, an idea proposed by Dandadan composer Kensuke Ushio. Dandadan director Fuga Yamashiro aimed for the setting to feel nostalgic, using this song to accomplish that. In turn, he had the colors toned down for the hot springs part, wanting to evoke old Kadokawa Daiei Studio films visually by making it look more subdued.

== Reception ==
Let's Go to the Cursed House has received mixed reception. Bleeding Cool writer Alejandra Bodden enjoyed the episode, particularly how the main characters have compassion for "creatures" like Taro and Hana. She also enjoyed Okarun and Jiji becoming friends, as well as the creepiness of them finding the secret room. CBR writer Alan A. Mehanna felt that it was the "perfect season finale" and a demonstration of what made Dandadan so successful. He praised the episode for building tension to a cliffhanger, as well as praising Jiji, stating that his positive energy and the "terrifying darkness" he is dealing with make him complex. He felt that Jiji helped escalate things, particularly with making Okarun more proactive and enjoying the friendship the two experienced. He also commended English voice actor Aleks Le for his portrayal. Mehanna believed that the different episodes have different genres, describing it to a Scooby-Doo!-like mystery story. Despite enjoying the episode, he found the anatomical model story unimportant besides serving as motivation for Okarun. Dengeki Online writer Kawachi felt that while Taro and Hana's love seemed rushed, he found it moving, enjoying how it depicts a romance story comically. He also enjoyed the creepiness of the episode, stating that people whose thoughts you cannot discern can be frightening. He stated that his favorite scene was Okarun and Jiji playing soccer together, describing passing the ball back and forth as a metaphor for them stating their feelings for Momo.

The episode received criticism, particularly for its depiction of sexual assault and being a cliffhanger. Game Rant writer Naledi Ramphele considered it the worst episode of the season, believing that it was not a necessary episode. He argued that the peril Momo was in may be distressing for viewers and was a "tool for cheap suspense and discomfort," though noting that the discovery of the hidden room was a more successful tension builder. He disliked that Jiji's arc, whom he felt had the best development of the main cast, was interrupted, saying that they should have either depicted the entire events of the "Cursed House arc" from the manga or ended the season when Jiji is introduced so that he could be the focus of season 2. Screen Rant writer Rohit Jaiswar also considered it the worst episode, believing that its weaknesses lie more in its status as a "transitional episode" for the next season instead of content issues. Anime News Network writer James Beckett stated that he did not envy the production team, believing that they would have to make significant cuts to the anime to make it end later in the story. Despite this, Beckett felt that the end result was not an ideal way to end the season. Responding to the hypothetical argument of cutting the anatomical model plot, Beckett found this scene enjoyable, both due to Momo and Okarun playing "matchmaker" as well as being the inciting incident to make Okarun more determined. He felt that, if a new season was unconfirmed, he would be more upset with the cliffhanger as well.

Screen Rant writer Vanessa Piña believed that Science Saru highlighted Momo's sexual assault to stoke controversy. She stated that they changed this scene to occur before the Kito family is met by Jiji and Okarun, and that Momo being held underwater was something that did not happen in the manga. Piña claimed that the fight was a short moment in the manga, calling it a "disturbing and anticlimactic angle" that is changed to give it more focus than the conspiracy of the story. She also argued that the episode could have cut down other content, such as Taro running, Okarun's thoughts, or their arrival, allowing the episode to end after Momo is saved. Piña believed this would have temper criticisms of the series' reliance on sexual content. Alejandra Bodden stated that she found it triggering, also disliking that it ended so quickly and stating that the cliffhanger "killed [her] a little." The Mary Sue writer Kirsten Carey bemoaned the use of sexual assault in Dandadan as a tool to advance the plot, considering a near sexual assault in the first episode a hurdle that she and others had to overcome. She noted that some fans were told that this was an anomaly in Dandadan, expressing disappointment in the scene near the end of episode 12. Carey believed that the initial scene of the men approaching Momo in the hot springs was well done, exemplifying to male viewers why men sharing a bath with men behaving like this is such a threatening experience for a woman. Her getting forced underwater created a question of whether she was going to be "gang-raped," believing this to be in poor taste. She stated that such a cliffhanger, specifically on whether a character may be raped, is not a common one due to it not being compelling. She argued that because sexual assault is traumatic, it may trigger viewers, especially when it is unresolved.

Despite the criticisms, Alan A. Mehanna felt that people framing it as a fan service scene need to reevaluate their perspective. He argued that sex can feel uncomfortable, stating that as a "coming-of-age" story, Dandadan having elements of sexuality makes sense. He also argued that sexuality as a horror element is often featured in live-action horror stories. Screen Rant writer Joshua Fox made a similar argument. Fox stated that this scene invited controversy due to a combination of factors, in addition to having to wait until July for the scene to resolve, he believed Dandadan used explicit sexual content often, particularly with female characters. While acknowledging these things, he believed that the criticisms overlook it being a coming-of-age story, which he argued "confusing and often terrible sexual experiences" they experience while growing up. He also argued that Dandadan uses negative sexual situations to highlight how people may have to go through bad sexual experiences before finding a good relationship.
