= Turbo granny =

Japanese urban legend

Turbo granny (ターボばあちゃん Turbo Baachan) is a type of modern-day yōkai (supernatural monster) or anomaly associated with urban legends.

== Overview ==
The legend typically describes a scenario in which a person driving through a tunnel suddenly hears a knock on the window. Upon looking, the driver sees an old woman running alongside the vehicle, staring at them. The location of these sightings is frequently cited as Mount Rokkō in Hyōgo Prefecture.

In the Encyclopedia of Modern Japanese Supernatural Phenomena (Nihon Gendai Kaii Jiten), Itsuki Asazato references an entry from Don't Turn Around for Tanaka in a Dream (edited by Setsuko Watanabe). This entry describes an anomaly on Mount Rokkō as an old woman who "appears on the highway and runs on all fours alongside speeding cars," with "a piece of paper reading 'Turbo' attached to her back." Asazato categorizes this under the heading of "Turbo Babaa" (Turbo Hag). Additionally, Don't Turn Around for Tanaka in a Dream records a similar phenomenon from Fukuoka Prefecture involving an "old person in a kimono." This entity is described as an old woman in a "grey kimono" who chases automobiles on all fours; if she catches up, she allegedly leaps onto the windshield, causing the vehicle to overturn.

== Derivative forms ==
Kaisoku Baachan (High-speed Granny)
Described in School Ghost Stories 16 (edited by the School Ghost Story Editorial Committee) as a report originating from Nagai City, Yamagata Prefecture. She manifests as an old woman of about 80 years of age and is said to have overtaken a car traveling at 80 km/h.

Kanoke Babaa (Coffin Granny)
This entity runs alongside a vehicle, drags the driver out, places them inside a coffin she is carrying, and transports them directly to a crematorium. According to Itsuki Asazato, she is also known to appear on expressways.

Kōsoku Babaa (Light-speed Granny)
According to Bintaro Yamaguchi's Encyclopedia of "Modern Yōkai" That Really Exist in Japan, this is an anomaly in the form of an old woman who runs at the speed of light. In the same author's True Cursed Urban Legends, she is said to have appeared "around 2003."

30-Centimeter Babaa (30-cm Granny)
An apparition said to appear near the Hikihara Pass in Amino, Kyoto Prefecture. Although her height is only about 30 cm, she reportedly runs past moving bicycles. While folklore claims she raises orphans and generally causes no harm to people, Asazato suggests a possible connection to the "Thirty-centimeter Baba" reported from Kyoto in Scary Rumors Sent to the Movie 'School Ghost Stories' (edited by Poplar Publishing). That entity dwells "under JR railroad underpasses" and bites people.

Tricycle Granny (Sanrinsha no Obāsan)
An elderly female apparition said to appear along the coast of Miyazaki Prefecture. Typically, only the sound of a tricycle being pedaled is heard, but on rare occasions, the figure of an old woman pedaling a tricycle at high speed manifests before vanishing.

Jet Babaa (Jet Granny)
An entity that chases cars at tremendous speeds, grinning as she overtakes them. It is rumored that being overtaken by her leads to accidents, although she is generally considered harmless. She is also regarded as a predecessor to the Turbo Babaa.

Jump Baba
It is said that when one drives at night, this apparition in the guise of an old woman will jump and overtake the car from behind.

1000-Kilometer Babaa
An anomaly resembling an old woman who runs on the highway at incredible speeds. Asazato suggests the possibility that she "runs at 1000 km/h."

Tatata Babaa
If one rides a motorcycle or drives a car at night, this old woman reportedly appears and runs at the exact same speed as the vehicle. It is said that paying too much attention to her will result in an accident.

Dash Babaa
A supernatural entity appearing as an old woman who emerges from behind a car traveling on the expressway and overtakes it at blistering speed.

Hyper Babaa
Considered an evolved form of Turbo Babaa possessing even greater power; she is regarded as a precursor to the Light-speed Granny.

Hashiru Baasan (Running Granny)
An anomaly haunting a specific tunnel in Hokkaido; she runs at the same speed as motorcycles while laughing and exposing bright red teeth. Legend holds that even if a driver reaches speeds of 100 km/h, she will catch up, though she vanishes once the vehicle exits the tunnel.

80-Kilometer Baachan
When a vehicle travels at 80 km/h, this apparition—consisting only of an upper body—appears and chases the vehicle using only her arms to run.

Basket Baachan (Basketball Granny)
This entity runs alongside a motorcycle traveling on the highway while dribbling a basketball and throws the ball with a chest pass. If the rider accidentally catches the ball, the bike will crash; if ignored, she reportedly throws the ball at the rider anyway, causing a fatal crash. A similar anomaly of the same name, or "Jumping Babaa," is said to appear near a tunnel on the border between Aichi Prefecture and Shizuoka Prefecture. This version, dressed in a "kimono and basketball shoes," is linked to a story of a spirit appearing in a school gymnasium around 2:00 AM to shoot baskets. The highway version is described as wearing a "kimono and geta" while chasing automobiles (vehicles that encounter her are said to meet with accidents).

Hijikake Babaa
Appearing in Namba, Osaka, she chases automobiles; it is said that if she catches up, the encounter results in death.

120-Kilometer Babaa
An old woman who sprints at 120 km/h on the highway.

100-Kilometer Babaa
An anomaly that attaches itself to cars driving late at night around Lake Mashū. It is said that one cannot escape unless traveling over 100 km/h, and being overtaken results in an accident.

100-Kilometer Baachan
An old woman apparition said to appear when driving late at night on the mountain pass leading to Lake Shikotsu. She runs on all fours, and if she catches up before the car reaches the tunnel, an accident allegedly ensues.

Pyon-pyon Babaa (Skipping Granny)
Said to haunt a mountain road in Aichi Prefecture. She is believed to be the spirit of a woman who died in a motorcycle accident. She chases cars while making small jumps (skipping), and it is said that those she catches are cursed to die.

Hopping Baachan (Pogo Stick Granny)
On mountain roads, she suddenly drops in front of the driver riding a pogo stick (known as a "hopping" in Japan) and leaps over the car in a single massive bound. While she may not attack directly, the story often warns that the startled driver may mishandle the steering wheel, leading to a fatal accident.

Bonnet Babaa (Hood Granny)
While one is driving on a national highway, an old woman suddenly climbs onto the bonnet (hood) of the car. If the startled driver loses control, they may die; however, continuing to drive for 7 km is said to be the correct countermeasure.

Yotsunbai Baba (All-fours Granny)
An anomaly in the form of an old woman running on all fours.

Rear Car no Obāsan (Handcart Granny)
An apparition haunting a tunnel in Hokkaido; she pulls a rear car (handcart) and is said to run at the same speed as an automobile. This phenomenon may sometimes manifest as an old man pulling a cart, and it is said that if the observer is in a white car, a boy riding a "tricycle" will appear instead.

The "Baachan" (Granny) portion of the name varies by region, appearing as "Baasan" or "Babaa." Similarly, "Turbo" has various derivatives such as "Dash," "Jet," "Hyper," and "Light-speed" (Kōsoku). In some instances, the running speed itself serves as the name, with versions corresponding to various speed limits under the Road Traffic Act, such as "40-km Babaa," "60-km," "80-km," "120-km," and so on.

- "Maritsuki Mari-chan" (Ball-bouncing Mari): The spirit of a girl killed in a hit-and-run while bouncing a ball, who sprints down the road at speeds exceeding automobiles.
- "Maritsuki Jijii" (Ball-bouncing Old Man): Chases cars on the road at high speed while bouncing a ball.
- "Rear Car Obasan" (Handcart Auntie): A woman pulling a handcart in Hokkaido who races against cars traveling at 80 km/h.
- "Skipping Girl": Near the Tsuyama Interchange in Okayama Prefecture, a girl wearing a white blouse, red skirt, and randoseru (backpack) skips between cars at 80 km/h.

Furthermore, patterns exist where the primary entity is an animal such as a dog or cat, with varying accounts regarding the presence of aggression or the ultimate outcome. According to Asazato, following the example of a "serious-looking salaryman-style middle-aged man riding a bicycle alongside a car running at 100 km/h" collected in Don't Turn Around for Tanaka in a Dream, there are several reports of salaryman-style men "pedaling bicycles on the highway."

== In popular culture ==
In volume one of Dandadan, Okarun encounters and is possessed by a Turbo Granny.

She also appears in the Mob Psycho 100 anime.
