= List of Dandadan episodes =

Key visual for the series

Dandadan (Note: Also written as Dan Da Dan) is an anime television series based on the manga series Dandadan by Yukinobu Tatsu. Announced in November 2023, the anime series is produced by Science Saru and directed by Fūga Yamashiro, with scripts written by Hiroshi Seko, character designs by Naoyuki Onda, alien and supernatural entity designs by Yoshimichi Kameda, and music composed by Kensuke Ushio. The series aired from October 4 to December 20, 2024, on the Super Animeism Turbo programming block on all JNN affiliates, including MBS and TBS. (Note: JNN affiliates listed the series premiere as airing on October 3 at 24:26, which is effectively October 4 at 12:26 a.m. JST.) The opening theme song is "Otonoke" (オトノケ), performed by Creepy Nuts, while the ending theme song is "Taidada", performed by Zutomayo. Prior to the television airing, the English dub of the series premiered at Anime NYC on August 24, 2024. The first three episodes also were collected and released theatrically as a compilation film under the title Dan Da Dan: First Encounter, with screenings starting in Asia on August 31.

Crunchyroll is streaming the series outside of Asia, including the Middle East and CIS, while Netflix is streaming the series globally. Hulu and ADN are streaming the series in the United States and several European territories, respectively. Muse Communication licensed the series in Asia-Pacific. In June 2024, GKIDS announced that it had acquired the theatrical, videogram, and digital transactional rights to the series. The English dub of the series made its broadcast television premiere in the United States on Adult Swim's Toonami programming block on July 27, 2025.

In August 2024, prior to the premiere of the English dub, the first two episodes of the anime were leaked alongside many other anime productions that were localized by Iyuno. Episodes 3–6 were later leaked prior to the anime's premiere.

After the airing of the first-season finale, a second season was announced and aired from July 4 to September 19, 2025. (Note: JNN affiliates listed the season premiere as airing on July 3 at 24:26, which is effectively July 4 at 12:26 a.m. JST.) Abel Góngora co-directed the season with Fūga Yamashiro. Crunchyroll and Netflix announced that they would stream the season worldwide, while Hulu and ADN is streaming it in the United States and several European territories, respectively. The first three episodes of the season premiered in theaters outside Japan as a compilation film under the title Dan Da Dan: Evil Eye beginning on May 30 in Asia, and on June 7 in Europe. The opening theme song for the season is "Kakumei Dōchū" (革命道中; lit. 'On the Way'), performed by Aina the End, while the ending theme song is "Doukashiteru" (どうかしてる; lit. 'Something's Wrong with Them'), performed by WurtS. Following up on a sneak peek airing of its first episode on December 28, 2025, the English dub of the second season is officially set to broadcast on Adult Swim's Toonami programming block on March 29, 2026.

After the airing of the second-season finale, a third season was announced. It is set to premiere in 2027.

== Series overview ==
Season	Episodes	Originally released	
Season	Episodes	First released	Last released
1	12	October 4, 2024	December 20, 2024
2	12	July 4, 2025	September 19, 2025

== Episodes ==
=== Season 1 (2024) ===
No. overall	No. in season	Title	Directed by (Note: Production staff information is taken from the ending credits of each episode.)	Storyboarded by	Original release date	English air date
1	1	"That's How Love Starts, Ya Know!"; Transliteration: "Sorette Koi no Hajimari jan yo" (Japanese: それって恋のはじまりじゃんよ)	Fūga Yamashiro	Fūga Yamashiro	October 4, 2024	July 27, 2025
After a breakup with her boyfriend, Momo Ayase briefly defends a loner student from some bullies. Shortly after the period ends, the two get into an argument over an occult magazine, as the student believes in the existence of extraterrestrial aliens while Momo believes in the existence of supernatural entities. Momo and the student then challenge each other to prove their respective beliefs are real, with Momo going to an abandoned hospital to contact a UFO and the student going to an isolated tunnel to find a spirit. Suddenly, both are validated when the student gets possessed by a spirit named Turbo Granny, who demands to take his "banana." At the same time, Momo is abducted by aliens called the Serpo, who claim they want to mate with her as an experiment. The student and Turbo Granny enter the UFO through Momo's discarded cell phone. Meanwhile, Momo recalls her grandmother's words and gains psychokinetic powers. Together, they join forces to defeat the Serpoians and crash the UFO back down to Earth. The student then introduces himself as Ken Takakura, the same name as the actor Momo idolizes, much to her shock, as the UFO explodes behind her.
2	2	"That's a Space Alien, Ain't It?!"; Transliteration: "Sorette Uchūjin ja ne" (Japanese: それって宇宙人じゃね)	Rushio Moriyama	Fūga Yamashiro	October 11, 2024	August 3, 2025
Momo and Ken, who is then nicknamed "Okarun" by Momo to avoid being flustered by his real name, go to Momo's grandmother's house to recuperate as Momo holds Okarun's curse at bay. There, they are attacked by a monster that resembles a sumo wrestler who traps them within the property's realm. Initially believing the monster is an evil spirit, they soon realize it is actually the Flatwoods monster. Okarun forces Momo to release her powers, holding off the curse to fight off the alien, which transforms him into a yōkai form that balances him and Turbo Granny. Despite this, they do not deal enough damage to the alien, who wounds Okarun. Momo lures the alien to the property's gate, allowing herself to be pushed out of the gate's boundaries. She grabs Okarun and places a talisman that wards off spirits at the gate, burning the alien as they are freed from its realm. Relieved they won, Momo passes out from exhaustion. Without her powers keeping the curse in check, Turbo Granny fully possesses Okarun.
3	3	"It's a Granny vs. Granny Clash!"; Transliteration: "Babā to Babā ga Gekitotsu jan ka" (Japanese: ババアとババアが激突じゃんか)	Daiki Yonemori	Daiki Yonemori	October 18, 2024	August 10, 2025
Momo's grandmother and spirit medium Seiko arrives home and incapacitates the possessed Okarun. After regaining consciousness, a worried Momo asks Seiko what happened to Okarun. Seiko points to the property's shrine, where Okarun is being kept safe. Momo explains Okarun's situation to her grandmother, also revealing her newfound ability to use psychokinetic powers. Seiko expounds on the circumstances of Turbo Granny, adding that she had fused with a stronger location-bound crab spirit found in the tunnel. Despite Seiko's warning not to fight the spirit, Momo is determined to help Okarun, prompting Seiko to tell Momo and Okarun that Turbo Granny's power is weaker in the city outskirts and have them train the next day. Turbo Granny later appears and tells Momo they must fight her in the tunnel, threatening to use Okarun's curse to kill more people if they do not comply. Left with no other options, Seiko blesses Momo and Okarun with protection, and the two head for the tunnel to fight Turbo Granny.
4	4	"Kicking Turbo Granny's Ass"; Transliteration: "Tābo Babā o Buttobasō" (Japanese: ターボババアをぶっ飛ばそう)	Moko-chan	Moko-chan	October 25, 2024	August 17, 2025
After arriving at the tunnel, Momo and Okarun plan to lure Turbo Granny to the city outskirts to defeat her, but they are immediately cornered by Turbo Granny, who takes away Okarun's curse. Momo goads her to a game of tag, distracting her long enough for Momo and Okarun to capture her and regain Okarun's curse. They attempt to run for the outskirts and escape the crab spirit and corpses possessed by Turbo Granny to no avail, despite Okarun using his yōkai form to outrun them; Turbo Granny also breaks free from Momo's grasp. Momo lures Turbo Granny on a train traveling to the city outskirts, and Momo and Okarun, with the help of Seiko, defeat Turbo Granny and presumably free Okarun from the curse. They return to the tunnel to pay their respects after learning that Turbo Granny originally set out to comfort the spirits of girls who were victims of sexual assault and died horrible deaths. Momo later tells Okarun she is looking forward to seeing him the next day, much to Okarun's delight.
5	5	"Like, Where Are Your Balls?!"; Transliteration: "Tama wa Doko jan yo" (Japanese: タマはどこじゃんよ)	Hiromi Nishiyama	Hiromi Nishiyama	November 1, 2024	August 24, 2025
As Momo and Okarun begin to bond at school, they get into a quarrel when Momo's friends Miko and Muko misinterpret them as a couple after seeing them accidentally kiss. Okarun goes to the bathroom to relieve himself, but he makes a startling discovery. He then rushes to Momo's classroom, asking to speak with her, but she turns him away. At the end of classes, Okarun bumps into a student and apologizes to her; Momo later overhears the student leave and make fun of Okarun. Angered, Momo uses her powers to injure the student. Okarun soon reveals to Momo that, despite retrieving his "banana", he has now lost his balls, prompting the two to seek Seiko. Seiko performs a ritual on Okarun, and Momo pulls out a spirit from him, which possesses a nearby maneki-neko doll. The doll is revealed to be the consciousness of Turbo Granny, who explains she possessed Okarun before being defeated. Despite Turbo Granny no longer possessing him, Okarun is still able to transform to his yōkai form, and Seiko reveals that only her spiritual powers remain in him. Upon being confronted, the powerless Turbo Granny reveals she has no idea where she placed Okarun's balls.
6	6	"A Dangerous Woman Arrives"; Transliteration: "Yabē Onna ga Kita" (Japanese: ヤベー女がきた)	Nozomi Fukui	Nozomi Fukui	November 8, 2024	August 31, 2025
Turbo Granny explains that Okarun's balls, which are now kintama, are infused with her aura that draws spirits to them. At school, the student who picked on Okarun, Aira Shiratori, remarks on being able to see Momo's powers as Aira pulls out a kintama, which she took in the aftermath of Momo and Okarun's fight with Turbo Granny; Turbo Granny sees this and informs the two, sensing that Aira may have awakened to her spiritual powers. Aira confronts Momo and Okarun, asking to speak with Momo, whom she attempts to exorcise. Okarun and Turbo Granny rush to Momo's aid, but Okarun states Aira is being targeted as a figure in a pink dress captures her and calls themselves Aira's mother. Okarun and Momo fight the figure, and she swallows Okarun; Turbo Granny learns the figure is a spirit named Acrobatic Silky. When Aira calls the spirit a monster, Acrobatic Silky also swallows her before doing the same to Momo. Acrobatic Silky suddenly burns as Momo lit her hair using Aira's cross lighter, forcing her to free the trio.
7	7	"To a Kinder World"; Transliteration: "Yasashii Sekai e" (Japanese: 優しい世界へ)	Kōtarō Matsunaga	Shūto Enomoto	November 15, 2024	September 7, 2025
Momo and Okarun distract Acrobatic Silky long enough to defeat her, and they retrieve Okarun's kintama from Aira. However, the two realize Aira died due to being unable to handle a spirit as an ordinary human. As a result, Acrobatic Silky offers to revive Aira by passing her aura to the latter. Momo connects their auras and sees Acrobatic Silky's past, revealing she was a single mother who worked odd jobs, including prostitution, to support her daughter and pay off a debt. Loan sharks eventually broke into their home and assaulted the mother, abducting her daughter in the process; these events drove the mother to commit suicide. Her spirit wandered around for some time and forgot her daughter until a young Aira, who was dealing with the loss of her mother, sensed and mistook her for her own. Seeing this, the spirit vowed to protect Aira, transforming into Acrobatic Silky. Aira is revived, and Momo is left in tears with the revelation as Acrobatic Silky withers away, voicing regret on being unable to reconcile with her trauma. After witnessing her past, Aira embraces and comforts Acrobatic Silky, praying she may find peace and swearing not to forget her.
8	8	"I've Got This Funny Feeling"; Transliteration: "Nanka Moyamoya Suru jan yo" (Japanese: なんかモヤモヤするじゃんよ)	Hiroshi Nishikiori	Hiroshi Nishikiori	November 22, 2024	September 14, 2025
Despite being saved by Momo and Okarun, Aira remains adamant in believing Momo is a demon and plans to free Okarun from her control, much to Momo's chagrin; Turbo Granny also reattaches Okarun's kintama to his body. Momo grows uneasy with Okarun splitting off from her at school, and later sees him on top of Aira. A few minutes earlier, Okarun split off from Momo to exercise when Aira found him. Aira awkwardly confessed her feelings to Okarun, and they argued until Aira tripped him, leaving the two in the same position Momo had found them in. Okarun attempts to clear the confusion, but a jealous Momo refuses to listen. As classes continue, Okarun notices the school flooding and his classmates disappearing, leading him to meet with Aira. He reasons that they are trapped in a realm similar to the one he fought in against the Flatwoods monster. Elsewhere, Momo hides from an alien resembling a plesiosaur as Okarun and Aira are confronted by a mantis shrimp-like alien. The Serpoians return, capturing Okarun and incapacitating Aira. As they plan to experiment on Okarun, Aira awakens to Acrobatic Silky's powers and stops the Serpoians from harming him.
9	9	"Merge! Serpo Dover Demon Nessie!"; Transliteration: "Gattai! Serupo Dōbā Dēmon Nesshī!" (Japanese: 合体！セルポドーバーデーモンネッシー！)	Kenji Maeba	Kenji Maeba	November 29, 2024	September 21, 2025
Aira deals with the Mantis Shrimp and Serpoians as a naked Okarun joins her in the fight, with Momo later arriving to provide support, and they defeat the Serpo-controlled Mantis Shrimp. All the combatants are then alarmed by the realm turning into water and the arrival of the plesiosaur, which Okarun recognizes as "Nessie", as it slowly kills off the Serpoians. The Mantis Shrimp grows stronger in the aquatic environment and knocks out Aira, causing Momo and Okarun to panic. Okarun urges Momo to open up if she's feeling upset, and together they rescue Aira and escape the aliens. Momo and a resuscitated Aira strip down to their undergarments to not be weighed down by the water, while the remaining Serpo, fed up with the incompetence of their allies, forcibly merges with Nessie and the Mantis Shrimp. Momo, Okarun, and Aira initially struggle to fight the fused alien, but after learning of its weaknesses, they work together to defeat it and return to their real school. Although relieved, the entire school misinterprets the three streaking and engaging in sex, much to their horror and embarrassment.
10	10	"Have You Ever Seen a Cattle Mutilation?"; Transliteration: "Kyatoru Myūtirēshon o Kimi wa Mita ka" (Japanese: キャトルミューティレーションを君は見たか)	Kayona Yamada	Jong Heo	December 6, 2024	September 28, 2025
Momo and Aira sulk in despair following the incident as the girls and Okarun discuss what the goals of the aliens were. Okarun then explains to Momo the circumstances of the previous day. Meanwhile, when Aira's classmates conspire to harass Momo amid rumors that Aira had spread about the latter, Aira takes full accountability for her actions and asks them not to slander Momo further. Aira later meets with Momo as they confront the wounded Mantis Shrimp, whom they take to Seiko's house. After eating dinner, the Mantis Shrimp explains his son Chiquitita is at risk of dying due to constantly losing blood. Hearing this, Seiko provides him a glass of milk, which the Mantis Shrimp realizes is an equivalent to his blood. Overjoyed, the Mantis Shrimp is allowed by Seiko to abduct a cow and gives his thanks, promising to help the group if they need him. A few minutes later, a visitor arrives at the house, whom Momo recognizes as Jin "Jiji" Enjoji. When Okarun asks who he is, Seiko reveals that Jiji is Momo's childhood friend and first love, which shocks him.
11	11	"First Love"; Transliteration: "Hatsukoi no Hito" (Japanese: 初恋の人)	Tooru Hasuya	Shinsaku Sasaki	December 13, 2024	October 5, 2025
Seiko reveals Jiji will be staying with them due to his parents being hospitalized; Jiji later discloses to Momo that his parents are victims of supernatural circumstances, leading him to seek out Seiko under the recommendation of various spirit mediums. As Jiji transfers to Momo and Okarun's school, Okarun becomes anxious and jealous, particularly when Jiji banters with Momo, leading him to worry that Momo will cut ties if she starts dating Jiji. As he leaves Momo and Jiji on one occasion, Okarun encounters a sentient anatomical model named Taro running away, leading him to call out Momo. Momo then notices a shiny object under Taro's groin, which she assumes is Okarun's remaining kintama. Momo, Okarun, and a confused Jiji chase Taro throughout the city, and they follow him to a junkyard, where Taro reunites with another anatomical model named Hana. After hearing Taro's proclamation of love to Hana, Okarun realizes he is in love with Momo and becomes inspired to continue fighting for her.
12	12	"Let's Go to the Cursed House"; Transliteration: "Noroi no Ie e Rettsu Gō" (Japanese: 呪いの家へレッツゴー)	Tetsuya Wakano	Hiromi Nishiyama	December 20, 2024	October 12, 2025
After realizing the kintama Momo saw was just a Christmas ornament, the group takes Hana to Seiko's house and waits for Taro to retrieve her, as Jiji experiences hallucinations of the spirit responsible for his parents' hospitalization. Momo, Jiji, and Okarun travel to Jiji's resort town, where Okarun's jealousy of Momo and Jiji's bond grows. Remembering Taro's proclamation, Okarun tries to catch Momo's attention with his interests, but instead, he surprises Jiji. They arrive at Jiji's cursed mountainside home, unaware they are being watched. Momo notices nothing out of the ordinary and suspects the spirit is hiding, prompting her to tell Okarun and Jiji to stay and rest as she travels back into town to visit an onsen alone. Okarun is forced to bond with Jiji, and they discuss what they like about Momo. Meanwhile, at an onsen, Momo is suddenly cornered by a group of elderly men as Okarun and Jiji notice a new room. After breaching its fake wall, the boys discover the room is filled with talismans.

=== Season 2 (2025) ===
No. overall	No. in season	Title	Directed by	Storyboarded by	Original release date	English air date
13	1	"Like, This Is the Legend of the Giant Snake"; Transliteration: "Orochi Densetsu tte Korejan yo" (Japanese: 大蛇伝説ってこれじゃんよ)	Kayona Yamada	Jong Heo	July 4, 2025	March 29, 2026 (Note: Adult Swim aired a sneak peek of this episode on December 28, 2025, while hosting a marathon of the first season.)
Momo fights off her attackers by smashing pieces of the onsen into them until the authorities intervene. Meanwhile, Jiji and Okarun hide the talisman-filled room when the Kitos, a family of older women and men, arrive at Jiji's home. Jiji reveals the Kitos are his landlords as they begin interrogating him. Elsewhere, Momo tracks down a rumor about a tsuchinoko, but only finds some desiccated snake skin at a shrine that is supposed to hold it. When she returns to the house, she notices Jiji and Okarun have been restrained by the Kitos. Once she fights them, Momo is blasted into the hidden room by the Kitos' matriarch, Naki, and starts sinking into quicksand. Everyone soon falls into the hole where they discover a neighborhood buried within the mountain. They then encounter a giant snake god, which Okarun recognizes as the Mongolian death worm. The death worm proceeds to eat the Kitos, who were trying to sacrifice the trio, as the kids seek refuge in one of the buildings. Despite their safety, Momo and Okarun start losing control of themselves, with the latter suddenly turning into his yōkai form before crawling towards Jiji and roaring furiously at him.
14	2	"The Evil Eye"; Transliteration: "Jashi" (Japanese: 邪視)	Yoshihiko Mori	Eisaku Kawanami	July 11, 2025	April 5, 2026
Jiji saves Momo and Okarun from killing themselves due to the death worm's psychic powers when he encounters a spirit named Evil Eye, whose abilities conflict with the death worm. Momo and Okarun regain their sanity and fight off the death worm, as Jiji gazes at Evil Eye. Jiji sees visions of a frail child whom the Kitos sacrificed to prevent disaster, and later roamed as a spirit who can only watch the parents of children killing themselves due to the death worm. Upon seeing the Kitos still using the children as sacrifices, Evil Eye plotted to kill them. Jiji attempts to help Evil Eye by going to his original corpse, worrying Momo and Turbo Granny as the death worm traps them with its slime. Jiji promises to play with Evil Eye to ease his pain, motivating the latter to possess Jiji successfully. Evil Eye scares off the death worm, leaving Momo in awe as Turbo Granny warns the possessed Jiji has also become their enemy. As Evil Eye begins to fight Momo, Okarun arrives to counter his attack.
15	3	"You Won't Get Away With This!"; Transliteration: "Yurusa nē ze" (Japanese: ゆるさねえぜ)	Tetsuya Wakano	Tetsuya Wakano	July 18, 2025	April 12, 2026
Momo and Okarun escape Evil Eye and find the death worm spraying poison. Okarun suggests defeating the death worm with sunlight and lets Momo escape first, as he handles freeing Jiji from Evil Eye's control. Momo begins her plan by setting Jiji's house on fire and prays for Okarun and Jiji's safety during their fight. Evil Eye, frustrated with Okarun's nimble movement, traps him inside a confined space, allowing Evil Eye to brutally beat him. Okarun becomes enraged at Evil Eye's control over Jiji and the threat to kill Momo, and he takes the upper hand against Evil Eye and defeats him before losing his powers. Okarun attempts to rescue Turbo Granny from the slime, only to trap himself as well. Meanwhile, the death worm becomes disturbed by the water used by the firefighters trying to put out the house fire and is forced above ground, where it dies after being exposed to sunlight and pukes out the Kitos. Naki reprimands Momo for killing the death worm, and Momo leaves to retrieve Okarun and Jiji, when a volcanic eruption suddenly rocks the resort town.
16	4	"That's, Like, Way Deadly"; Transliteration: "Yabasugi jan yo" (Japanese: やば過ぎじゃんよ)	Hironori Tanaka	Hironori Tanaka	July 25, 2025	April 19, 2026
Contesting Naki's prophecy, Momo drags the death worm's carcass across town and attaches it to a geyser at the destroyed onsen to convert it into a giant hose, dousing the volcano's lava with the ensuing blend of slime. The Kitos attempt to stop Momo, but they are rebuffed by a priest she met at the tsuchinoko shrine, who is revealed to be a disciple of Seiko named Manjiro. A revived Evil Eye joins in the melee and fights everyone, forcing Momo, Naki, and Manjiro to work together. As they lose to Evil Eye, they are then interrupted by the intervention of the Mantis Shrimp, his UFO, Seiko, and Taro, who successfully bait and seal Evil Eye within himself using warding talismans. As a now-healthy Chiquitita continues fighting the volcano's fires, Momo returns to the house's ruins to save Okarun, only to find a pool of lava. Chiquitita uses the UFO's tractor beam to extract Okarun and Turbo Granny, who were protected by the death worm's slime. Momo and Okarun share a hug, with Momo relieved that Okarun is alive.
17	5	"We Can All Stay There Together!"; Transliteration: "Minna de Otomari jan yo" (Japanese: みんなでお泊まりじゃんよ)	Taku Kimura	Shugo Tsuneoka	August 1, 2025	April 26, 2026
Seiko's group tries to exorcise Jiji from Evil Eye as they eat dinner, with Aira joining them. Seiko and Manjiro discuss Evil Eye's possession when Jiji is apparently freed from his control. Seiko realizes Jiji and Evil Eye switch places when he is doused with either hot or cold water, forcing the group to monitor Jiji until the exorcism is complete. Momo, Okarun, and Aira then escort the Mantis Shrimp and Chiquitita home, as the Mantis Shrimp decides to go by the name Peeny-Weeny. Seiko and the group visit Jiji's parents, during which Momo and Okarun hold hands. Meanwhile, Naki goes on the run after the police arrest the Kitos, and she vows revenge against Momo as she sheds her skin and reveals herself to be a cryptid. Sometime later, Momo invites Okarun and Aira to a sleepover to help monitor Jiji, and they comply. Taro then frees Jiji, and they enjoy dinner at Seiko's house. When Okarun passes a bottle of soy sauce to Seiko, a droplet falls on Jiji, allowing Evil Eye to take control and wreak havoc.
18	6	"We Became a Family"; Transliteration: "Kazoku ni Narimashita" (Japanese: 家族になりました)	Kayona Yamada	Kayona Yamada	August 8, 2025	May 3, 2026
The group immediately douses Jiji with hot water and worries about Evil Eye's growing strength, as a visual kei band named Hayashi arrives and reveals themselves to be the exorcists Seiko requested. Seiko lets them set up their equipment, and Hayashi joins her to exorcise Jiji through music, much to the awe of Momo, Okarun, and Aira. Hayashi's music disturbs Evil Eye, causing Jiji to tearfully plead not to kill him. Seeing Jiji's earnestness, Seiko stops the exorcism and allows Evil Eye to join their foster family. Despite their hesitation, Momo, Okarun, and Aira decide to become stronger to hold back Evil Eye and assist Jiji in managing his spiritual powers. The group spends the night inside Seiko's damaged house, where Okarun and Jiji bond over their struggle to control their spiritual powers and the Ayase family's care for them. The next morning, Momo, Okarun, and Aira head to school while Jiji continues his training with Seiko. Momo decides to help renovate the house by taking a part-time job. Hearing this, Miko and Muko later drag Okarun to a maid café against his will, where they see Momo currently working to her embarrassment.
19	7	"Feeling Kinda Gloomy"; Transliteration: "Nanka Moyamoya Suru jan yo" (Japanese: なんかモヤモヤするじゃんよ)	Hiromi Nishiyama	Hiromi Nishiyama	August 15, 2025	May 10, 2026
Miko and Muko tease Momo as she begrudgingly serves drinks to her friends and a flustered Okarun. Momo continues working until the end of her shift, when she finds Okarun waiting for her. Meanwhile, Jiji can gradually control Evil Eye, much to Seiko's relief. When Momo and Okarun return home, Jiji accidentally collides with Aira, causing Aira's cold drink to spill on Jiji and for Evil Eye to reappear. Evil Eye strangles Momo as the latter spews out hot water to neutralize him. Jiji regains control and becomes horrified by Evil Eye's actions, leading to his distancing himself from Okarun. Seiko and Manjiro discuss the precarious circumstances, and Manjiro reluctantly suggests requesting Hayashi again for an exorcism. Later at midnight, Okarun trains to fight harder following his failure to intervene in Evil Eye's strangling of Momo. Turbo Granny sees him and takes him to his school, with Aira following them. The group decides to train in the music room to improve their fight rhythm and timing, when they are confronted by a group of doppelgänger composers led by Ludwig van Beethoven and pulled into their realm.
20	8	"You Can Do It, Okarun!"; Transliteration: "Ganbare Okarun" (Japanese: がんばれオカルン)	Tetsuya Wakano, Takuya Fujikura & Yoshihiko Mori	Tetsuo Yajima	August 22, 2025	May 17, 2026
The composers strike at Okarun and Aira with their music and tight compositions, leaving Okarun and Aira overwhelmed and unable to dodge their attacks. A frustrated Turbo Granny urges Okarun to improve his fight rhythm, and Okarun synchronizes his timing to Hayashi's music. Okarun begins to perform better in combat with Aira, forcing Beethoven to use the Ninth Symphony and corner them with giant vocalists and a hostile audience. Okarun and Aira work together to defeat the vocalists and composers, during which Okarun unlocks his full potential in his yōkai form. The group is freed from the composers' realm, and Okarun thanks Aira and Turbo Granny for their help. Back at Seiko's house, Manjiro reveals he has requested Hayashi's services again out of concern for their safety, leaving Momo in disbelief. Okarun, Aira, and Turbo Granny return home, and a determined Okarun challenges Evil Eye to a duel. Seeing Okarun's resolve, Jiji allows Evil Eye to possess him, and they begin fighting.
21	9	"I Want to Rebuild the House"; Transliteration: "Ie o Tatenaoshitai" (Japanese: 家を建て直したい)	Yoshihiko Mori	Jong Heo	August 29, 2025	May 24, 2026
Okarun matches Evil Eye's strength, and they destroy Seiko's house, leaving Evil Eye wanting to continue the duel. Okarun refuses and compromises on fighting him once a week in exchange for not harming innocent people, which Evil Eye begrudgingly accepts. Jiji regains consciousness, and the group goes their separate ways with Jiji reuniting with his recovered parents, though Okarun and Aira return with Peeny-Weeny to help Momo and Seiko rebuild their house using nanoskin. Momo and Okarun discuss how the house has become a place of belonging for their newfound friendships. Later on, Jiji shares with Momo that Evil Eye is behaving well, thanks to Okarun's compromise. However, Momo soon sees a mischievous Evil Eye taking control on their way to school. Momo is forced to look after Evil Eye, while keeping his possession of Jiji a secret. Miko and Muko mention a sighting of a floating kintama at a housing complex, catching Momo's attention. Elsewhere, Okarun is approached by his classmate Kinta Sakata.
22	10	"The Secret Art of Being Attractive"; Transliteration: "Moteru Hiketsu wa Nan da" (Japanese: モテる秘訣はなんだ)	Amagaeru	Ai Yukimura	September 5, 2025	May 31, 2026
In a flashback, Kinta observes Okarun around school, during which he sees Okarun and Momo's accidental kiss. In the present, Kinta approaches Okarun to ask how he managed to befriend Momo and Aira despite his unremarkable appearance. Momo barges into their classroom to tell Okarun about the kintama, bewildering Kinta. Tensions escalate when the class representative, Rin Sawaki, requests Momo to leave on Okarun's behalf, thinking she is his bully, causing Kinta to believe that Okarun is popular with the girls. After school, Momo and Okarun head to the housing complex, as Kinta follows them. The duo spots him, and they are suddenly pulled into a realm by the kintama. Momo and Okarun attempt to retrieve it, as Okarun reveals to Momo that the kintama has an unseen physical form. They also rescue Kinta, who, with his interest in science fiction, points out that the kintama is camouflaging itself. He works with Momo and Okarun to corner the kintama and defeat it. The camouflage dissipates, revealing the kintama to be a kaiju. Momo, Okarun, and Kinta are further shocked to see the kaiju increase in size.
23	11	"Hey, It's a Kaiju"; Transliteration: "Kaijū jan yo" (Japanese: 怪獣じゃんよ)	Kōtarō Matsunaga	Shinsaku Sasaki	September 12, 2025	June 14, 2026
Momo, Okarun, and Kinta run in terror from the kaiju, as Aira and Jiji also become caught in the carnage. The group fights back the kaiju while Momo orders Jiji to escort Kinta to safety. Momo incapacitates the kaiju, and Aira heads to deliver the finishing blow. However, the kaiju camouflages itself to lure Aira and defeats her. Okarun exhausts his powers to rescue Aira before retreating to Seiko's house with Momo. Meanwhile, Jiji and Kinta continue running to the house when Kinta's sweat makes contact with Jiji, causing Evil Eye to take over and further confuse Kinta. As the group is reluctant to ask for Evil Eye's assistance, Okarun proposes using the house's nanoskin to construct a countermeasure against the kaiju, though he has difficulty imagining it. Kinta volunteers to imagine the countermeasure and transforms the house into a mecha resembling the Buddha, surprising the group. Momo asks Kinta how they can control the mecha as the kaiju slowly approaches them.
24	12	"Clash! Space Kaiju vs. Giant Robot!"; Transliteration: "Gekitotsu! Uchū Kaijū tai Kyodai Robo!" (Japanese: 激突！宇宙怪獣対巨大ロボ！)	Kenji Maeba	Kenji Maeba	September 19, 2025	June 21, 2026
The group struggles with controlling the mecha and fails to coordinate, as the kaiju easily beats them up. Kinta, realizing he can fulfill his dreams of piloting a mecha after experiencing alienation from his classmates due to his interests, fully controls it and matches the kaiju's strength. Momo and Aira assist Kinta in finally defeating the kaiju, freeing them from its realm. After exposing itself to the public, the mecha flees to Seiko's property and reverts back to the house, while Okarun and a restored Jiji, who were ejected from the mecha during the fight, drag the shrunken kaiju back home. As Momo and Aira vomit heavily from being in the mecha, Kinta offers his assistance to the group's future endeavors. The boys wonder about the circumstances surrounding the kaiju, which they discover is actually a suit worn by a humanoid girl. The girl then sees Okarun and kisses him, leaving everyone shocked as the house explodes behind Momo.

== Home media release ==
=== Japanese ===
Aniplex (Japan – Region 2/A)
Vol.	Episodes	Cover character(s)	Release date	Ref.
Season 1
1	1–3	Momo Ayase	January 29, 2025	
2	4–6	Ken "Okarun" Takakura	February 26, 2025	
3	7–9	Seiko Ayase and Turbo Granny	March 26, 2025	
4	10–12	Aira Shiratori	April 23, 2025	
Season 2
5	13–15	Jin "Jiji" Enjoji	October 8, 2025	
6	16–18	Ken "Okarun" Takakura and Evil Eye	November 12, 2025	
7	19–21	Momo Ayase and Aira Shiratori	December 3, 2025	
8	22–24	Kinta Sakata	January 7, 2026	

=== English ===
GKIDS / Shout! Studios (North America – Region 1/A)
Season	Episodes	Release date	Ref.
1	1–12	June 10, 2025	
2	13–24	July 14, 2026	
