= Aira Shiratori =

Fictional character from Dandadan

- Dandadan character
- First appearance: "Like, Where Are Your Balls? (タマはどこじゃんよ, Tama wa Doko jan yo)", 2021
- Portrayed by: Riko Tanaka
- Voiced by: Japanese; Ayane Sakura; English; Lisa Reimold

In-universe information
- Alias: Aira

Aira Shiratori (Japanese: 白鳥 愛羅, Hepburn: Shiratori Aira), also known as Aira (アイラ), is a fictional character from the manga and anime series Dandadan. She is a fellow student of Momo Ayase and Okarun, who is initially adversarial with Momo but later works alongside her, especially after her encounter with Acrobatic Silky in the episode "To a Kinder World". In the anime, Aira is portrayed by Ayane Sakura in Japanese and Lisa Reimold in English; and in the stage play, she is portrayed by Riko Tanaka. She has also appeared in video games and had merchandise of her released. Viewers and critics noted the character's growth and change in behavior in Dandadan.

== Conception ==
=== Voice actresses ===
Aira Shiratori is played by Ayane Sakura in Japanese and Lisa Reimold in English. Sakura previously played Yotsuba Nakano in The Quintessential Quintuplets and Ochaco Uraraka in My Hero Academia. In an interview with Anime! Anime!, Sakura said that she originally did not understand if the voice was appropriate for Aira. Conversely, an article in Japan Anime News noted Sakura said that the manga fascinated her and was concerned about adapting the manga, but she enjoyed playing Aira. Lisa Reimold, the actress in the English dub, noted that although Aira appears superficial and egoistic, she cannot easily express "deep feelings" because of not being able to communicate them with others.

=== Characterization and themes ===
Aira is depicted as having excessive confidence and a "sharp tongue". A writer for Animate Times, Mikiko Watanabe, described her as averse to loss and her personality as distorted and serious. Although she and Momo call each other names, Aira cares for people. Moreover, Watanabe characterized her as brave, strong, beautiful, and sympathetic to children. Another page by Watanabe in Animate Times described her as acrobatic and that her long hair allows her to capture enemies better. Aira's fight with Yōkai Acrobatic would lead to Aira's death and revival and cause Aira to remember her mother's love. Also, Watanabe said when Aira goes in front of classmates and acts pure, her true nature was willingness to fight. Nevertheless, she cares about Momo, helps train her, and fights alongside her. Japan Anime News wrote that Aira considers herself beautiful, places herself in a position of leadership, and manipulates boys. Conversely, she behaves gently and commiserately, particularly towards vulnerable beings. A scene in the Dandadan manga shows Aira taking care of a shrunken Momo. Acrobatic Silky grants her the ability to use long hair in any way. An article by Anime Freaks stated that Aira thinks of herself as cute, as she says in the fifth episode of the anime, and she misunderstands Acrobatic Silky as a demon of Momo. According to Moumita Chakraborty of FandomWire, Aira's name, consisting of the kanji for "love", "silk", and "white bird", is a reference to Swan Lake, supported by the connection to Acrobatic Silky's role as a ballerina.

== Appearances ==
Aira Shiratori first appears in the tenth chapter of the Dandadan manga. In the anime, Aira first appears in the fifth episode. She appears in Dandadan as a classmate of Momo Ayase and Okarun. When she was younger, she lost her mother, and her father encouraged her to act independently. She first appears as adversarial with Momo, but then changes her behavior. When Aira picks up a golden ball belonging to Okarun, her powers awaken, and she sees herself as a savior. Acrobatic Silky kills Aira, but Momo and Acrobatic Silky bring her back to life. Aira tries to kiss Okarun in the next episode, but that episode reveals Aira got her ideas of romance through her father's magazines and videos. In the tenth episode of the anime, she helps Momo and Okarun fight an antagonistic school nurse.

In the stage play, Riko Tanaka portrays her. Aira appears in Grand Summoners and Monster Strike. Merchandise involving the character include figures, headphones, and cosplay pieces.

== Reception ==
According to Laveena Joshi of FandomWire, viewers appreciated Lisa Reimold's portrayal of Aira, including depicting Aira's pretense and ruthlessness. Anurag Gusain, another writer for FandomWire, wrote that Aira's change in personality causes viewers to appreciate her. Regarding the seventh episode of Dandadan, "To a Kinder World", fans felt pity for Aira's history presented by Acrobatic Silky during her offer to rescue her, and fans appreciated the quality of the episode. Writing for Bleeding Cool News, Alejandra Bodden called the episode "beautifully written" and highlighted the losses both Acrobatic Silky and Aira experienced, the subsequent disintegration of Acrobatic Silky, and Aira's promise to Momo after Momo saddens. Tushar Auddy of FandomWire said that viewers objected to Aira's understanding of romance being based on her father's collection of adult films in the eighth episode of Dandadan. A writer for Anime Freaks noted that the scene of fan service in the ninth episode of the anime with Momo and Okarun caused viewers to react favorably. Kyle Foley of But Why Tho? also praised Aira's role in the same episode, noting Aira's desire for Okarun as a "funny little interaction" and appreciating her competence in acrobatics. Melvyn Tan of Anime Trending appreciated Aira's choice not to revile Momo. Writing for THEM Anime Reviews, Allen Moody thought that Aira started out as narcissistic, and noted that in the second season Aira hates Turbo Granny but grovels over Okarun.
