= List of Dandadan characters =

A selection of characters from the series; from left to right: Ken "Okarun" Takakura carrying Turbo Granny (maneki-neko), Momo Ayase, Jin "Jiji" Enjoji, Aira Shiratori, Seiko Ayase, Unji Zuma, Vamola, Rokuro Serpo (standing, wearing green apron), Kinta Sakata (crouching, with backpack), Reiko Kashima (taller), and Peeny-Weeny (wearing rubber apron and boots).

The Japanese manga series Dandadan features an extensive cast of characters created by Yukinobu Tatsu.

== Main characters ==
The main characters of the series are the "Family" (家族, Kazoku), a group of kids led by Seiko dealing with the supernatural. The members of the Family who also attend high school at Kami High are also members of the History and Culture Research Club (歴史文化研究部, Rekishi Bunka Kenkyū-bu), which serves as a front for their activities.

=== Momo Ayase ===
Voiced by: Shion Wakayama (Japanese); Abby Trott (English)
Portrayed by: Yuiri Murayama

Momo Ayase (綾瀬 桃, Ayase Momo) is a high school girl who believes in ghosts and the supernatural. This is in part due to the influence of her grandmother, Seiko, working with them, but after she got teased for it at school, Momo cursed Seiko out for this, causing their relationship to become strained. After being abducted by Serpo aliens, she discovers she has psychokinetic powers, allowing her to visualize the "auras" of people and objects, and visualizes her power as giant hands to "grab" and control these auras. Momo has a celebrity crush on actor Ken Takakura, often becoming flustered whenever someone says his full name out loud. Although she and Okarun initially do not get along and constantly argue and fight with each other, after defeating Turbo Granny, they become close friends and throughout the course of the story, she develops strong feelings for Okarun. She decides to help him get his testicles back, with the ultimate goal of mending her relationship with her grandmother.

=== Ken Takakura / Okarun ===
Voiced by: Natsuki Hanae (Japanese); A.J. Beckles (English)
Portrayed by: Raimu Ninomiya, Hiroki Hyakuna (transformed)

Ken Takakura (高倉 健, Takakura Ken) is a shy and friendless high school boy who tries to connect with Momo over their shared interests in the supernatural. Momo and her friends call him "Okarun" (オカルン)—derived from "occult" after his interest in the topic—so that she is not inadvertently reminded of her celebrity crush, though Okarun is oblivious to the origin of this. After being possessed by the Turbo Granny, Okarun gains the ability to enter a powerful demonic state, granting him immense speed but also a suave yet lethargic alternate personality. Okarun has been bullied frequently by his other classmates for his nerdy demeanor, but grows to take solace in his new friends and eventually becomes somewhat popular. Most of all, he values and cares a lot about his friendship with Momo due to her being his first real friend, and after his initial encounter with Taro and Hana, he realizes he is in love with Momo, eventually confessing to her. The loss and recovery of his testicles (kintama) is the main focal point for most of the series.

=== Seiko Ayase ===
Voiced by: Nana Mizuki (Japanese); Kari Wahlgren (English)
Portrayed by: Aoi Nakabeppu

Seiko Ayase (綾瀬 星子, Ayase Seiko) is a spirit medium and Momo's grandmother, though her youthful appearance suggests she is in her 20s. Despite lacking innate supernatural abilities, she possesses vast knowledge of curses and yōkai, using enchanted artifacts and the power of a local deity—effective only within the city—to exorcise spirits. Brash and aloof, she often frustrates others, particularly due to her susceptibility to flattery and her refusal to admit that aliens exist, but remains deeply protective of Momo and her allies. She also hosts a television program where she demonstrates genuine spiritual feats such as fortune-telling, which has made her surprisingly wealthy.

=== Turbo Granny ===
Voiced by: Mayumi Tanaka (Japanese); Barbara Goodson (English)

Turbo Granny (ターボババア, Tābo Babā) is a yōkai who takes the form of a cruel, foul-mouthed elderly woman. Turbo Granny used to dwell within a tunnel in Shono City, where she would comfort the spirits of girls who had died horrible deaths. However, she began to curse and steal the genitals of anyone who entered her territory. After Momo and Okarun defeat her, Seiko seals her spirit inside a maneki-neko doll, and she agrees to aid Okarun and Momo in finding Okarun's testicles in exchange for receiving her powers back.

=== Aira Shiratori ===
Voiced by: Ayane Sakura (Japanese); Lisa Reimold (English)
Portrayed by: Riko Tanaka

Aira Shiratori (白鳥 愛羅, Shiratori Aira) is the school idol of Kami High. Although she puts on the appearance of a ditzy and amiable person, she is proud and boasts a Messiah complex, a direct result of her inability to reconcile with the death of her mother at a young age. After obtaining one of Okarun's kintama, Aira reawakened her suppressed ability to see the supernatural, which coupled with her egomania, led her to believe that she was divinely chosen to exorcise yōkai and thus targets Momo, believing her and Okarun to be demons. The resulting confrontation culminated in her absorbing Acrobatic Silky's powers, giving her a similar transformation to Okarun as well as immense agility and prehensile hair. Aira subsequently allies with Momo and Okarun despite still thinking they are demons, and develops a crush for Okarun for his selfless nature. As the Family grows, she declares herself their leader, but becomes more selfless over time in making them her new friend group, and becomes friends with Momo even though they still argue occasionally.

=== Jin Enjoji / Jiji ===
Voiced by: Kaito Ishikawa, Makoto Koichi (young) (Japanese); Aleks Le, Ryan Bartley (young) (English)

Jin Enjoji (円城寺 仁, Enjōji Jin) is Momo's childhood friend and first crush, until he teased her over Seiko's rituals for her. He goes by the nickname "Jiji" (ジジ). After his parents were hospitalized as a result of his house being haunted and possessed by the Evil Eye, Enjoji moved in with Momo and Seiko before transferring over to Kami High and joining Momo's class. Though considered an attractive and athletic jock, Jiji is actually an eccentric dork who constantly throws praise onto others and views everyone in a positive light. After Jiji apologizes for his behavior, he and Momo rekindle their friendship, and as a result Okarun feels jealous over his relationship with Momo, which is later revealed to be somewhat valid as Jiji has developed a crush on her as well. He is possessed by the Evil Eye, who goes on a blind rampage when in control of Jiji's body.

=== Evil Eye ===
Voiced by: Mutsumi Tamura (Japanese); Anne Yatco (English)

Evil Eye (邪視, Jashi), based on the supernatural curse of the same name, is a vengeful yōkai born from a human sacrifice. His mind-corrupting presence drives adults to madness and suicide, leading him to believe humanity rejected him. He eventually forms a contract with Jiji, granting the boy enhanced abilities and the power to manifest nearly indestructible constructs shaped by past grudges. Though initially bent on global vengeance, he is placated through a weekly battle agreement, eventually becoming an ally. His influence is suppressed by hot water and revived by cold.

=== Kinta Sakata ===
Voiced by: Daichi Fujiwara (Japanese); Bryce Papenbrook (English)

Kinta Sakata (坂田 金太, Sakata Kinta) is Okarun's classmate, a withdrawn but imaginative student fascinated by the supernatural. Though less overt than Okarun, his obsession with aliens and the paranormal proves vital when using nanoskin, an alien technology that materializes the user's thoughts. Socially awkward, Kinta frequently makes unwelcome advances toward female peers, who generally rebuff him; only Vamola, due to her naivete, responds with occasional tolerance. Despite his crude behavior, his creativity makes him a key figure in harnessing nanoskin's abilities.

=== Vamola ===
Vamola (バモラ, Bamora) is the last survivor of the Sumerian alien race, having escaped to Earth after her home planet's destruction. Honoring her adoptive mother's final wish, she seeks a powerful husband capable of defeating her in combat to continue her lineage. She pilots a giant mechanized suit resembling a kaiju. After being subdued by the combined efforts of Momo, Aira, and Kinta, she mistakenly believes Okarun defeated her and pursues him as a potential husband. She eventually accepts that love cannot be forced and forms a sisterly bond with Momo after being taken in by Seiko. While learning Japanese, she frequently mimics the speech patterns of those around her.

=== Rin Sawaki ===
Voiced by: Manaka Iwami (Japanese); Suzie Yeung (English)

Rin Sawaki (佐脇 凛, Sawaki Rin), known as Class Rep (委員長, Iinchō), serves as the strict class representative for Okarun, Kinta, and Vamola's class. Secretly fascinated by vampires, she initially mistakes Okarun's Turbo Granny form for a vampire and suspects Momo of bullying him. Following an encounter with the lingering spirit of a childhood friend, she develops gravity manipulation powers tied to her singing ability. Her disciplined nature as class leader contrasts with her hidden supernatural interests and newfound abilities.

=== Unji Zuma ===
Unji Zuma (頭間 雲児, Zuma Unji) is a student at Renjaku High School, and is the leader of a gang of delinquents from other high schools. He lost his family as a child and is subsequently adopted by Bega, who too lost his family. He has supernatural, umbrella-based powers after encountering the spirit of his younger brother, now turned into a yōkai dubbed Umbrella Boy. After being led to obtain one of Okarun's testicles, Unji makes an attempt at beating a supernatural diorama board game named Danmanra.

=== Kouki Yukishiro ===
Kouki Yukishiro (雪白 幸姬, Yukishiro Kōki) is a student who confronted Momo in the school library while Momo was still small from the Danmanra adventure. Although she was a piano prodigy when she was younger, she has since become invisible to her family and other classmates, hiding her face behind long, disheveled hair. She is acting on directions from a shadowy figure, after they blackmailed her because of a lewd selfie. She has the power to make small living beings obey her will.

== Supporting characters ==
=== Humans ===
==== Miko ====
Voiced by: Kaori Maeda (Japanese); Sarah Anne Williams (English)

Miko (ミーコ, Mīko) is a gyaru student and one of Momo's best friends. She claims to have prescient insight into Momo and Okarun's "relationship" and, along with Muko, supports them as a couple.

==== Muko ====
Voiced by: Miyu Tomita (Japanese); Anairis Quiñones (English)

Muko (ムーコ, Mūko), nicknamed Kei-san (ケイさん), is a tanned gyaru student and one of Momo's best friends. She often follows Miko's lead, including on matters relating to Momo and Okarun. Turbo Granny has stolen her phone, largely to research the supernatural.

==== Queen Sensei ====
Voiced by: Chiaki Takahashi (Japanese); Allegra Clark (English)

Queen Sensei (女王, Joō) is the diligent and reliable school nurse who listens to all of the students' problems. Though she cares for the students, she often puts them off with her kinky behavior, most exemplified by the whip she uses to flog miscreants and even her fellow school staff.

==== Manjiro ====
Voiced by: Hiroyuki Yoshino (Japanese); Kevin Andrew Rivera (English)

Manjiro (万次郎, Manjirō) is Seiko's pupil and a spirit medium who is asked to help out in the Evil Eye case.

==== The Hayashi ====
Voiced by: Kishō Taniyama (Japanese); Marc Hudson (English) (Toshiro)
Voiced by: Genta Nakamura (Japanese); Xander Mobus (English) (Hideji)
Voiced by: Kazuaki Furuta (Japanese); Sean Chiplock (English) (Yoshikichi)

The Hayashi (囃子) are an eccentric band of musicians who sometimes help Seiko exorcise evil spirits using heavy metal music. Toshiro (トシロウ, Toshirō) is the vocalist, Hideji (ヒデジ) is the guitarist, Yoshikichi (ヨシキチ) is the drummer and Patterson (パターソン, Patāson) is the mute bassist. The fictional band is modeled after X Japan and the characters are named after four of its members; Toshi, Hide, Yoshiki, and Pata.

==== Masamichi Bega ====
Masamichi Bega (部賀正道, Bega Masamichi), also known as Bega the Demon (鬼の部賀, Oni no Bega), he is an extremely strict but kind police officer stationed at the Kamikoshi Police Box. He takes in Unji Zuma, a local delinquent boy, after discovering his background as an orphan.

==== Raiya Kazama ====
Raiya Kazama (風間 雷矢, Kazama Raiya) is a kind boy who belongs in Unji's gang and is his right-hand man.

==== Daiki Hakono ====
Daiki Hakono (箱野 大希, Hakono Daiki) received the game Danmanra for his birthday four years ago; after he was sucked into the cursed trunk, he began aging at an unnatural pace. By the time he was freed from the trunk, he looked like a middle-aged man, and when he seeks help from Momo several weeks after that, he looks like an old man with a long, white beard.

==== Payase ====
Payase (パヤセ) collects cursed objects; he works with Kashimoto, and both are acquaintances of Seiko. Payase can manipulate shadows and all their properties.

==== Kashimoto ====
Kashimoto (樫本) is Payase's partner, who is familiar with pygmies and offers intel to Seiko on Momo's case. He can utilize the power of Aphoom-Zhah, the Cold Flame, one of Great Old Ones of the Cthulhu Mythos of H. P. Lovecraft.

==== Yatagarasu ====
Yatagarasu (ヤタガラス) is a highly eccentric barber who wears his hair in a wildly teased pompadour. He is sent to protect the kids and shelters Kinta and Vamola first, then joins Okarun and Aira in fighting the Dragon Knights.

=== Aliens ===
==== Peeny-Weeny / Mr. Mantis Shrimp ====
Voiced by: Tomokazu Seki (Japanese); Brent Mukai (English)

Peeny-Weeny (ぺニーチンコス, Penīchinkosu), also called Mr. Mantis Shrimp (シャコさん, Shako-san), is an alien resembling a mantis shrimp with a turtle shell, inspired by the Dover Demon. His species communicates in distorted sounds and wields immense durability, rapid punches, and shapeshifting abilities, often serving as mercenaries. Peeny-Weeny, however, is unusually weak among them, taking odd jobs to afford blood transfusions for his ailing son, Chiquitita. After being defeated by Momo, Okarun, and Aira, he receives a cow from Seiko, whose milk sustains Chiquitita. In gratitude, he splits his time between caring for his son and assisting the Family, relocating to a nearby farm where Earth's gravity aids in milking.

==== Chiquitita ====
Voiced by: Naomi Ōzora (Japanese); Brittany Lauda (English)

Chiquitita (チキチータ, Chikichīta) is Peeny-Weeny's ailing but cheerful son, having inherited his mother's terminal illness. He grows close to the group through his father's work with them, particularly bonding with Aira, who sympathizes with his condition and takes on an affectionate, sisterly role.

==== Ludris ====
Voiced by: Shinya Takahashi (Japanese); Mick Lauer (English)

Ludris (ルドリス, Rudorisu) is a renowned, all-knowing and powerful alien who is constantly travelling the universe and a chance encounter with him being said to be considered a miracle. He is the creator of the nanoskin technology, with which the Ayase household is fixed.

==== Banga ====
Banga (バンガ) is an elderly Sumerian resistance fighter and Vamola's adoptive mother.

==== Rokuro Serpo ====
Rokuro Serpo (セルポ 6郎, Serpo 6rō) is the Serpo clone who helped fight the Kur invasion. Afterwards, he was branded as defective and exiled from the Serpo; he works part-time at a convenience store, always seeking out other job opportunities.

=== Spirits ===
==== Taro ====
Voiced by: Tomokazu Sugita (Japanese); Kaiji Tang (English)

Taro (太郎, Tarō) is an anthropomorphized anatomical model that resides at Momo and Okarun's high school. He is madly in love with Hana.

==== Hana ====
Voiced by: Fumi Hirano (Japanese); Allegra Clark (English)

Hana (花) is an anthropomorphized anatomical model that resides at the Ayase residence. Unlike Taro, Hana lacks any limbs.

==== Mai Kawabanga ====
Mai Kawabanga (川番河 舞, Kawabanga Mai) was the childhood friend of Rin Sawaki who had died due to a car accident. Her spirit then went on to become an Ombusman bound to Rin. After she and Rin reconcile, she becomes Rin's guardian spirit; refusing to move on until Rin becomes a successful idol.

==== Umbrella Boy ====
Umbrella Boy (アンブレラボーイ, Anburera Bōi) is the now-yōkai spirit of Unji's deceased brother, who possesses Unji's body. He provides Unji with umbrella-based powers, and is based on a kasa-obake.

==== Pygmies ====
Pygmies (小人, Kobito) are diminutive people that wear conical hats and masks and are able to stitch and weave at incredible rates. Only people sensitive to the spirit world can see them, including Momo and Queen; according to Queen, they have a strong desire to help Kouki because she can perceive them.

==== Hanako ====
Hanako (花子) is a powerful yōkai who attacked the Red Baron, Jack Wisp, and Vakappa, following their battle with Rin Sawaki and Kouki Yukishiro. She is acquainted with Turbo Granny. Hanako's power allows her to freely manipulate anything found within a bathroom, most notably toilets and urinals, but even the flooring. She is inspired by the Japanese urban myth of Hanako-san, or Toire no Hanako-san.

==== Abura ====
Abura (油) is a yōkai which has the form of a giant owl with human-sized legs. Abura is allied with Turbo Granny. After Hanako defeated the Red Baron, Jack Wisp, and Vakappa, Abura took Rin Sawaki and Kouki Yukishiro away to safety.

==== Burari ====
Burari (ふらり) is a yōkai which has four wings, allowing it to fly, and two muscular legs similar to a lion's hindquarters, ending in powerful claws. Burar is allied with Turbo Granny and saved Momo and Kinta from falling while they were fighting Hase and the oni-fied Okarun.

== Antagonists ==
=== Humans ===
==== Count Saint-Germain ====
Count Saint-Germain (サンジェルマン伯爵, Sanjeruman Hakushaku) is a mysterious collector of the paranormal and occult, with his main goal being to acquire something called Dandadan, and a hired consultant of both the Kur and the Black Paladins, who works as the deputy head teacher and advisor of the History and Culture Research Club in Momo and Okarun's high school, while under the guise of Sanjome (三丈目).

==== Hase ====
Hase (ハセ) is a popular kid in high school, who regularly bullies Okarun and later is granted supernatural powers to defeat Okarun, seeking payback for the humiliation he felt after being beaten in a footrace by the nerdy student.

==== Mika Adachi ====
Mika Adachi (足立 美加, Adachi Mika) is the teacher of class 2E at Kami High, who is granted the ability to summon Jiangshi Chinese zombies and instructed to attack powered people.

==== Takeshi Murakami ====
Takeshi Murakami (村上 剛史, Murakami Takeshi) is a staff member of Kami High, who is revealed to be blackmailing Kouki and Adachi using their lewd photos. He was granted the ability to summon spirit basketball players which use their heads as weapons and can steal other people's bodies if they put them in the basket.

==== Iron Minotaur ====
An ordinary, middle-aged salaryman was granted the abilities of an iron minotaur and ordered to attack Seiko when she was meeting with Payase; in that form, he is immensely strong and grows harder when struck due to cold working, but loses sensation. He agreed to that bargain to save his wife, who was diagnosed with a terminal illness. After he was defeated, his wife was cured, but the Red Baron stole his power.

==== Shinobi ====
Shinobi (志能便), also referred to as Basho (芭蕉, Bashō) by Saint-Germain, is a spy who concealed herself as one of the priests who restore Momo. When Momo awoke, she said that Seiko was in danger and asked Momo to pray with a yielding heart, which caused her to surrender her power.

=== Black Paladins ===
Thirteen human families make up the Black Paladins, a shadowy organization of powerful aristocrats that seek to control human lives. The Delacroix family, which has fallen into ruin recently, seeks to control the Paladins. In public, The Black Paladins are company-sponsored diviners that collect yōkai powers and curses to crush rivals.

==== Vlad Delacroix ====
Sir Vlad Delacroix (ブラド ドラクロワ, Burado Dorakurowa) is the prince of the Delacroix family, one of the thirteen families that make up the Black Paladins. He hired Count Saint-Germain to build him into the "ultimate" yōkai, using the Fairy-Tale Card, powered up by six of the Family's powers: Alice's Adventures in Wonderland (from Momo), Hansel and Gretel (from Zuma), Snow White (from Kouki), Little Red Riding Hood (from Enenra), The Little Mermaid (from Rin), and The Adventures of Pinocchio (from Okarun).

==== The Red Baron ====
The Red Baron (レッドバロン, Reddo Baron) serves the Delacroix family faithfully, being in love with Vlad's daughter, Lady Gilles de Rais, who gave him his nickname; he is an infamous assassin member also known as the Flying Ace (撃墜王, Gekitsui-ō), who acquired the power of a yōkai called Enenra (煙々羅, En'enra), allowing him to manipulate smoke and to turn his own body into smoke as well. The Evil Eye derisively nicknames him "Nug Lover" and Saint-Germain calls him "Old Heavy Smoker". He masquerades as a priest in order to steal Momo's powers as part of the larger conspiracy against supernatural powers relating to the Kozuka Knives. The Red Baron works with Vakappa and Jack Wisp.

==== Vakappa ====
Vakappa (ヴァカッパ, Bakappa) is a tall man with long blond hair and dark sunglasses, and a member of the Black Paladins who assisted Red Baron and Jack Wisp in confronting Rin Sawaki and Kouki Yukishiro in order to steal their powers. Vakappa possesses the ability to create, control, and transform into water at will, all presumably powers which were stolen from a yōkai as well.

==== Jack Wisp ====
Jack Wisp (ジャックウィスプ, Jakku Wisupu) is a member of the Black Paladins, with the appearance of a dandy man in a bowler hat and Spanish breeches who can emit flammable gas and ignite them with a snap of his fingers.

==== Gilles de Rais ====
Gilles de Rais (ジルドレ, Jirudore), also known as "The Black Barber", is Vlad's daughter who leads the Dragon Knights, Vlad's personal guards; she is the captain of its first company. Gilles de Rais wields two giant scissors and wears a full face mask. She has the stolen powers of a yōkai called the Black Haircutter (黒髪切り, Kurokamikiri), allowing her to significantly amplify the cutting power of any tool.

==== Blagojević ====
Blagojević (プロゴヨヴィッチ, Purogoyovicchi), also known as "The Sea Lion Man" (アシカ男, Ashika Otoko) is the captain of the second company of the Dragon Knights and the partner of Gilles de Rais. Blagojević is a muscular man wearing a thong swimsuit, who can transform into a sea lion to gain a dramatic increase in mobility on low‑friction surfaces, with the additional ability to turn surfaces to ice.

==== Cagliostro ====
Cagliostro (カリオストロ, Kariosutoro), is a young and muscular Count of the Black Paladin who wears a cowboy hat and boots and wields a corrosive whip when channeling the spirit of Albert Fish. In addition, Cagliostro can call forth spirits through rituals and spells. Using this skill in tandem with a fellow Dragon Knight's Blockchain Virus ability, they successfully resurrected dinosaurs from the fossils at the Super Amusement Park.

==== Clown Dragon Knight ====
The Clown Dragon Knight is Cagliostro's arrogant partner who wears a mask that resembles a ventriloquist's dummy. He possesses knowledge of virology that relates to necromancy, having engineered an abnormal virus capable of manifesting flesh from the residual memories stored within ancient bones. Using this creation in tandem with Cagliostro's spirit magic, they successfully resurrected dinosaurs from the fossils at the Super Amusement Park. He also uses a rifle besides virology.

==== Coat Dragon Knight ====
The Coat Dragon Knight is an attractive young woman wearing a fur-collared coat over a low-cut cocktail dress. She is partnered with the Diamond Earring Dragon Knight and the Masked Eyepatch Dragon Knight. Her power allows her to transform into a massive echidna.

==== Diamond Earring Dragon Knight ====
The Diamond Earring Dragon Knight is a strict, no-nonsense Dragon Knight who is dressed in a tie and waistcoat. They are partnered with the Masked Eyepatch Dragon Knight and the Coat Dragon Knight.

==== Masked Eyepatch Dragon Knight ====
The Masked Eyepatch Dragon Knight is a tall and intimidating Dragon Knight who has a clean-shaven head, an eyepatch covering his right eye, and a toothy mask covering his nose and mouth. He is partnered with the Coat Dragon Knight and the Diamond Earring Dragon Knight. His power allows him to transform into a gigantic human-octopus hybrid, complete with tentacle legs and the ability to squirt ink.

=== Spirits ===
==== Acrobatic Silky ====
Voiced by: Kikuko Inoue (Japanese); Amber Lee Connors (English)
Portrayed by: Risa Yamazaki

Acrobatic Silky (アクロバティックさらさら, Akurobatikku Sarasara) is a powerful yōkai with immense strength and agility. In life, she was a struggling single mother and ballet dancer forced into prostitution to support her daughter. After her daughter was kidnapped and she was violently assaulted, she took her own life. Upon becoming a yōkai, she mistakes Aira for her lost child and obsessively follows her for years. When Aira, now able to perceive yōkai, fails to recognize her, Acrobatic Silky lashes out, accidentally killing her. To atone, she revives Aira by transferring her powers, and Aira's kindness allows her to pass on peacefully.

==== Music Room Portraits ====
Voiced by: Naoya Uchida (Japanese); Kirk Thornton (English) (Vanben)
Voiced by: Kazumasa Nakamura (Japanese); Bryce Papenbrook (English) (Ninth)
Voiced by: Michitake Kikuchi (Japanese); Brent Mukai (English) (Trainspotter)
Voiced by: Yuichi Jose (Japanese); Mick Lauer (English) (Glasses)
Voiced by: Izou Oikawa (Japanese); Kaiji Tang (English) (Grandma Bach)

Music Room Portraits (音楽室の肖像画, Ongakushitsu no Shōzōga) are six tulpa spirits born from the fear of the musician portraits in Kami High's music room. If someone plays the room's piano poorly at 2 a.m., the Portraits will manifest and attempt to kill the performer. They are depictions of Ludwig van Beethoven (Vanben), Wolfgang Amadeus Mozart (Mozza), Johann Sebastian Bach (Grandma Bach), Franz Schubert (Glasses), Antonín Dvořák (Trainspotter), and Leonard Bernstein (Ninth).

==== Reiko Kashima ====
Reiko Kashima (カシマレイコ, Kashima Reiko), also known as the Slit-Mouthed Woman (口裂け女, Kuchisake-onna), is a yōkai that formerly resided in a ruined area in Kamikoshi City. After being bested by Momo, Reiko harbored a grudge against the girl and vowed to get revenge on her the next time they met. She ambushed Momo and Okarun during the Kur invasion, but destroyed the Kur fleet as it reminded of her past and death during WWII. She then decided not to take revenge on Momo after witnessing Momo and Okarun preparing to fight her to protect each other. She then went on a journey to find a man to love her.

==== Fairy-Tale Card ====
Fairy-Tale Card (メルへンカルタ, Meruen Karuta) is a yōkai sealed within the Danmanra board game and the creator of the cursed trunk's inner world.

=== Aliens ===
==== Alien Serpo ====
Voiced by: Kazuya Nakai (Japanese); Benjamin Diskin (English)

The Alien Serpo (セルポ星人, Serupo Seijin) are an entirely male alien race who come from Planet Serpo. Due to their race being exclusively all male, the Serpo have no way of reproducing naturally and resort to using cloning technology, but since biological evolution cannot occur within identical beings, the Serpo seek to gain reproductive organs by abducting humans from Earth and stealing their sex organs (or "bananas").

==== Naki Kito ====
Voiced by: Masako Isobe (Japanese); Morgana Ignis (English)

Naki Kito (鬼頭 ナキ, Kitō Naki) is the ruling matriarch of a subterranean family, who spent over 200 years offering human sacrifices to the Tsuchinoko in order to prevent her village's destruction, until Enjoji brought Momo and Okarun to the village.

==== Juichi Kito ====
Voiced by: Shirō Saitō (Japanese); Kirk Thornton (English)

Juichi Kito (鬼頭 呪一, Kitō Juichi) is a male member of the same subterranean family, which spent centuries offering human sacrifices to the Tsuchinoko.

==== Kur ====
The Kur (深淵ケの者, Keru) are a militaristic alien race who originate from the farthest reaches of space. Described by Serpo as globalists, they have been actively seeking out planets within the galactic system to conquer, including Vamola's homeworld. The leader of their advance group is named Hastur.

==== Frustrated alien ====
The frustrated alien arrived in a broken power suit and does not have the strength to stand up without it under the Earth's gravity. Count Saint-Germain gave her a new suit, marked with a skull and crossed swords arranged in a Jolly Roger on her mask, and teamed her up with Hase to take Okarun's powers, but they failed. Her plan for revenge on Hastur failed when he was defeated by the Family; she is frustrated with Okarun and Momo because she had worked for a century to become Hastur's trusted right hand. She wears her hair in a short pixie cut and her left eye's iris is marked by a crosshair. As a cover job on Earth, she is a baker at Tasty Geezer Breads, hiding her cross-hair eye under a patch.

==== Mr. Dris ====
Mr. Dris (ドリスさん, Dorisu-san) is wrapped in long white bandages, topped with an Egyptian funerary mask like a mummy. He rides a bicycle and wields a sword in addition to the ability to turn black asphalt pavement into a void. His true form resembles a blue whale, but in that shape he is unable to sustain his own weight under the influence of Earth's gravity.
