= Turbo Granny (Dandadan) =

Fictional character from Dandadan

- Dandadan character
- Turbo Granny in her maneki-neko form as she appears in the Dandadan anime
- First appearance: "That's How Love Starts, Ya Know! (それって恋のはじまりじゃんよ, Sorette Koi no Hajimari jan yo)", 2021
- Created by: Yukinobu Tatsu
- Portrayed by: Mayumi Tanaka
- Voiced by: Japanese; Mayumi Tanaka; English; Barbara Goodson

Turbo Granny (Japanese: ターボババア, Hepburn: Tābo Babaa) is a fictional character from the manga and anime series Dandadan. In Dandadan, she begins as an enemy of Momo Ayase and Okarun, but later joins their side. She is based on the turbo granny legend and is voiced by Mayumi Tanaka in Japanese and Barbara Goodson in English. Critics reacted positively to her portrayal in Dandadan. The character was nominated for Best Supporting Character at the ninth and tenth editions of the Crunchyroll Anime Awards.

== Conception ==
Yukinobu Tatsu designed the character. She appears as a yōkai who quickly runs through tunnels and disappears. According to Zack Davisson of Anime News Network, the character is based on the legend of turbo granny, said to have originated in Hyōgo Prefecture, but Tatsu expanded on the character.

=== Voice actresses ===
In Japanese, the character is portrayed by Mayumi Tanaka in the anime and the stage play. Tanaka previously portrayed Monkey D. Luffy in One Piece and Krillin from Dragon Ball. In English, Barbara Goodson voices the character. In an interview with Mantanweb, Tanaka said Turbo Granny was crass and she felt much like her. Abby Trott and Lisa Reimold, who provided the voices in the English dub of Dandadan for Momo Ayase and Aira Shiratori, respectively, praised Goodson's performace as Turbo Granny. Goodson herself appreciated her character.

=== Characterization and themes ===
According to Christopher Rudolph of People, Turbo Granny is unseemly and mischievous. In Dandadan, Turbo Granny is said to have run 100 kilometers per hour as a modern, strong yōkai and that she usually appears as an elderly woman, but also assumes the form of a maneki-neko. A writer for Animate Times, Mikiko Watanabe, wrote that rumors in 1990s Japan had no accidents, but drivers could cause accidents from expressing shock.

== Appearances ==
Turbo Granny first appears in the first chapter of Dandadan. In the series, she begins as an enemy of Momo Ayase and Okarun, but later joins them. She comes from a tunnel, and she possesses Okarun, grants him her powers, and reminds him that he has her powers. He and Momo work with Seiko Ayase to stop Turbo Granny. They defeat her, but she becomes a maneki-neko and allies with them.

Mayumi Tanaka reprises her role in the stage play. Turbo Granny appeared in a promotion called "Turbo Granny Meets The World", where her character appears in events in different countries. The character appeared in an advertisement for Fanta in a collaboration between Dandadan and The Coca-Cola Company. Merchandise featuring Turbo Granny includes figures, acrylic stands, bags, shirts, and knit caps.

== Reception ==
Editors at Oricon News wrote that fans of Dandadan favored the appearance and humor of Turbo Granny's maneki-neko form. Staff at Abema ranked Turbo Granny's scenes at the beginning of the anime the most commonly discussed topic from the first episode. Joshua Fox of ComicBook.com praised Turbo Granny's portrayal and behavior in Dandadan. Arpad Okay of The Beat compared Turbo Granny to a troll when he reviewed the first volume of the manga. Rebecca Silverman of Anime News Network also reviewed the first volume of the manga and found the jokes around Turbo Granny granting Okarun her powers strange. Coop Bicknell, also of Anime News Network, appreciated Barbara Goodson's performance of Turbo Granny in the anime, calling it "shrewd, crude, and sassy". Travis Hymas appreciated Mayumi Tanaka's performace of the character in the fourth episode and said that the voice is "calm and sinister". Kyle Foley of But Why Tho? found Turbo Granny to be humorous in her race against Momo Ayase and Okarun. When Jesse Lab of The Escapist reviewed Dandadan: First Encounter, he included Turbo Granny in his critique of the designs of the ghosts and extraterrestrials he found to be memorable.

Turbo Granny was nominated for Best Supporting Character in 2025 and 2026 at the 9th and 10th Crunchyroll Anime Awards, respectively.
