= Momo Ayase =

Fictional character from Dandadan

- Dandadan character
- First appearance: "That's How Love Starts, Ya Know!" (それって恋のはじまりじゃんよ, Sorette Koi no Hajimari jan yo), 2021
- Portrayed by: Yuiri Murayama
- Voiced by: Japanese; Shion Wakayama; English; Abby Trott

In-universe information
- Alias: Momo

Momo Ayase (Japanese: 綾瀬 桃, Hepburn: Ayase Momo), also known as Momo (モモ), is a fictional character from the manga and anime series Dandadan. She is played by Shion Wakayama in Japanese and Abby Trott in English. In her narrative, she believes in spirits, but not extraterrestrials. She has psychic powers and is in a relationship with Okarun. Merchandise featuring Momo has been released, and critics praised Momo's design and portrayal in Dandadan. Momo's Japanese actress received an award for Best Actor in a Leading Role at the 20th Seiyu Awards, and the character was nominated for Best Main Character at the ninth and tenth editions of the Crunchyroll Anime Awards.

== Conception ==
Yukinobu Tatsu, the author of Dandadan, first released it in April 2021. He created the character Momo Ayase and favored her. He often redrew her to protect how he wanted her to appear and compared her to Superman.

=== Voice actresses ===
Momo Ayase is portrayed by Shion Wakayama in Japanese and Abby Trott in English. According to Ryuya Kawasaki of Real Sound, Wakayama's performance was necessary for Momo because it helped provide necessary characteristics. In an interview about the second season of Dandadan with Animate Times, Wakayama remarked that Momo and Okarun's relationship looked appealing and charming, and that she was pleased to have her character be called Momo by Turbo Granny for the first time in that season. Wakayama said that when she and Turbo Granny's actress heard others say they were watching Dandadan, they were pleased. In an interview with Isaiah Colbert of Gizmodo, Trott said she enjoyed portraying Momo and that the blend of genres in Dandadan help Momo's conspicuousness. Trott also admired Momo's desire to protect people she cares about and remarked that she thought she read that in an interview the manga artist had, he favored her. Abby Trott and A.J. Beckles thought the scene of extraterrestrials known as Serpo kidnapping Momo and trying to get her reproductive organs could vex users, but Trott acknowledged that "the good outweighs those tough to watch moments".

== Appearances ==
In Dandadan, Momo Ayase is a high school girl who believes in spirits and has psychic powers. She appears in the first chapter of the manga, released in 2021, and the first episode of the anime. Her grandmother raises her as she grows up. She behaves typically of a gyaru and is irritable. She shows interest in a boy named Ken Takakura and protects him from bullies. Because she does not believe in extraterrestrials, but Ken does, she visits a hospital alleged to have extraterrestrials. Because of her affection for a well-known individual named Ken Takakura, she calls Ken "Okarun". Throughout the series, she works with Okarun to fight with paranormal forces and shows affection for him. They fight Turbo Granny, but Turbo Granny joins their side. A classmate, Aira Shiratori, initially acts adversarial towards Momo and claims she is a demon, but she becomes her ally and they insult each other. Jiji, also known as Jin Enjoji, is a former significant other of Momo in the series, but they become friends again. Two close friends of Momo include Miko and Muko.

Cosplayers have acted as Momo Ayase at conventions.

In the stage play, premiered August 26, 2026, Yuiri Murayama portrays Momo. Murayama formerly participated in AKB48, and she said she felt happy and fully committed to perform her on stage. Momo appears in the games Honor of Kings and Monster Strike. Merchandise featuring the character includes figures, keychains, acrylic stands, T-shirts, and stamps. Cosplayers have acted as Momo. She appeared in a collaboration between Dandadan and Tower Records on merchandise in 2021, and with Lawson on merchandise in 2024.

== Reception ==
Mikiko Watanabe of Animate Times appreciated Momo Ayase's appearance. Viewers similarly thought Momo looked and sounded attractive. Annie Banks of The Mary Sue praised Momo's character, stating that she subverts the "Mary Sue" argument and Dandadan lets her strengthen beyond her appearance and psychic powers. Moreover, Banks stated that the lack of objectifying traits lets Momo express herself, and because she is confirmed to be a gyaru, the gyaru archetype lets her reject social norms in terms of appearance and behavior. Banks called Momo "the female character that anime has desperately needed" because Dandadan lets Momo be tough, tender, and feminine in her narrative. Another contributor for The Mary Sue, Kirsten Carey, criticized the use of sexual assault in Dandadan, when the 12th episode of the anime showed Momo going in a hot spring, but five older men join in, comment on her, and attack her. Carey said that waiting months for resolution on a contentious issue such as sexual assault can offend people. Viewers reacted favorably to Momo wearing a maid outfit in the 18th episode of the anime and considered it an example of moe. Pedro Bustamente of El Comercio said that Momo's surprise with her psychic powers changes the course of the series. Josh Piedra of The Outerhaven considered Momo to be a boisterous girl behaving similarly to a boy and that Momo and Okarun's relationship with each other is favorable. He wrote that her concern for Okarun "shows a nicer, softer side" to her and prevents her from being too excited. Writing for THEM Anime Reviews, Allen Moody appreciated Momo's characterization in the first season despite her eccentric behavior. When Anthony Flagg of The Cosmic Circus was reviewing the first season of the anime, he called her "lovably stupid" in a way people support her, and he noted the clarity of her attraction and need for Okarun when they are alone. Aaheli Pradhan of FandomWire and Daniel Kurland of Bloody Disgusting said that Momo's behavior is normal for an adolescent. Pradhan appreciated her intelligence in the series and Tatsu's decision to make her the female lead, and Kurland appreciated Momo's willingness to consider Okarun's beliefs and her characterization. Laveena Joshi, also writing for FandomWire, stated that Momo defies film norms of strong female characters and wrote that Reese Witherspoon would admire Momo because of Momo's independent resolve.

Shion Wakayama, who portrayed Momo, received an award for Best Actor in a Leading Role at the 20th Seiyu Awards, and was nominated for Best Voice Artist Performance (Japanese) along with the international voices of the character in French, German, and Latin American Spanish at the 9th Crunchyroll Anime Awards. The character was nominated for Best Main Character at the ninth and tenth ceremonies, with Katia Sorrentino nominated on the latter edition in the Best Voice Artist Performance (Italian) for her portrayal as Momo.
