= Okarun =

Fictional character from Dandadan

- Dandadan character
- First appearance: "That's How Love Starts, Ya Know! (それって恋のはじまりじゃんよ, Sorette Koi no Hajimari jan yo)", 2021
- Portrayed by: Raimu Ninomiya; Hiroki Hyakuna
- Voiced by: Japanese; Natsuki Hanae; English; A.J. Beckles

In-universe information
- Full name: Ken Takakura

Ken Takakura (高倉 健, Takakura Ken), also known by his nickname Okarun (Japanese: オカルン), is a fictional character from the manga and anime series Dandadan. In his narrative, he believes in extraterrestrials, but not ghosts; opens up to fellow character Momo Ayase's beliefs; and is granted superhuman speed by Turbo Granny. He shares his name with Ken Takakura, so Momo calls him Okarun because her crush on the actor makes her to embarassed to say his name out loud. Okarun also appeared in video game collaborations and in merchandise. Critics generally praised the character's presentation in Dandadan. He was nominated for Best Main Character at the ninth and tenth editions of the Crunchyroll Anime Awards; and at the ninth edition in 2025, he was also nominated for "Must Protect At All Costs".

== Conception ==
=== Voice actors ===
Okarun is played by Natsuki Hanae in Japanese and A.J. Beckles in English. Hanae previously portrayed Ken Kaneki in Tokyo Ghoul and Tanjiro Kamado in Demon Slayer: Kimetsu no Yaiba. In an interview with Anime Trending, A.J. Beckles said he rejoiced over being chosen for the role of Okarun, and he described Okarun's character development in making friends and supporting Jiji. A.J. Beckles also said that a scene where Okarun fights Jiji is the "first genuine battle" for Okarun.

=== Characterization and themes ===
Okarun's legal name comes from the name of an actor named Ken Takakura, and he shares his first-person pronoun with him. Because of Momo Ayase's interest in the actor Takakura, she calls the student Ken Takakura "Okarun" instead of his legal name. According to Japan Anime News, Okarun's characterization as a "nerdy, socially awkward boy" benefits and hinders him. He is depicted in Dandadan as a frank person. When he acts in his transformed form, influenced by Turbo Granny, his speech degrades in propriety, but he can run at superhuman speed. According to Mikiko Watanabe of Animate Times, Okarun's decorum and relationships with others make up for his poor communication and clumsiness.

== Appearances ==
Okarun appears in the first chapter of the manga, released in 2021. He is initially known as Ken Takakura and shows affection for Momo Ayase over the course of the series. His classmates bother him, but Momo intervened. Okarun is interested in the occult and believes in extraterrestrials, but initially does not share Momo's belief in spirits. Because of Momo's interest in the actor Ken Takakura, Momo calls him "Okarun". Because of lack of social skills, he and Momo debated until they found Turbo Granny. Consequently, Turbo Granny possessed Okarun and caused him to lose control of his powers. In the second episode, Momo helps control these powers. Turbo Granny steals Okarun's genitals. He later gets his penis back, but he is missing his testes. Momo and Okarun defeat Turbo Granny. Aira Shiratori finds a golden testis and Okarun gets it back. Okarun later gets a male friend, Jiji.

In addition to the manga and anime, two actors play Okarun in the stage play adaptation. Raimu Ninomiya portrays Okarun's normal form, and Hiroki Hyakuna portrays his transformed form. Okarun appears in Jump+ Jumble Rush, Grand Summoners, and Monster Strike. His merchandise includes figures, headphones, and clothing. He appeared in a collaboration between Dandadan and Lawson.

== Reception ==
Chandra Shekhar of FandomWire called Okarun a "modern-day teen version of Dragon Ball's Vegeta", stating they both aggressively defend people they care about. Writing for IGN, Mike Mamon said that Okarun and Momo "struck the unlikeliest of bonds" and noted their "dysfunctional relationship", opposite characteristics, and willingness to work together. Mamon also appreciated Okarun's characterization and his performance by Natsuki Hanae, describing the difficulty of not hearing another character he portrayed, Tanjiro Kamado. When Adam Wescott of The Beat reviewed the first three episodes of Dandadan, he said he could imagine the scene of Momo needing to watch Okarun defecate to stop Turbo Granny in Chainsaw Man and that Yukinobu Tatsu included this scene because he wanted his audience to focus on the relationship between Momo and Okarun. Ross Locksley of UK Anime Network similarly said that they disagree with each other and respect each other, and he remarked on their relationship and energy. Critics noted the relationship between Okarun, Momo, and Jiji in the 12th and final episode of the first season. Isaiah Colbert of Gizmodo wrote that Okarun's fight with Jiji is a reference to a fight between Jotaro Kujo and DIO in Jojo's Bizarre Adventure: Stardust Crusaders. According to Laveena Joshi of FandomWire, Jiji's change from being a bully to praising Okarun allowed Okarun to accept him; moreover, she said Momo and Aira could not achieve what Jiji did. A contributor for But Why Tho?, Allyson Johnson, said that the ninth episode of the second season of Dandadan emphasizes Okarun's growth and strengthening as a character. She also praised Hanae's performance as Okarun. To commemorate the fifth anniversary of Dandadan, Chainsaw Man's author Tatsuki Fujimoto drew Okarun in his style, and fans enjoyed Fujimoto's drawing of Okarun, as Yukinobu Tatsu previously assisted with Chainsaw Man.

The character was nominated for Best Main Character in 2025 and 2026 at the 9th and 10th Crunchyroll Anime Awards, respectively. He was also nominated for "Must Protect At All Costs" in the ninth edition. Natsuki Hanae and A.J. Beckles were both nominated for Best Voice Artist Performance in Japanese and English categories for their portrayal as Okarun at the ninth, while Joel Gómez Jiménez was nominated in Castilian Spanish voice acting for his character's role at the tenth ceremony.
