= Barbara Goodson =

American voice actress

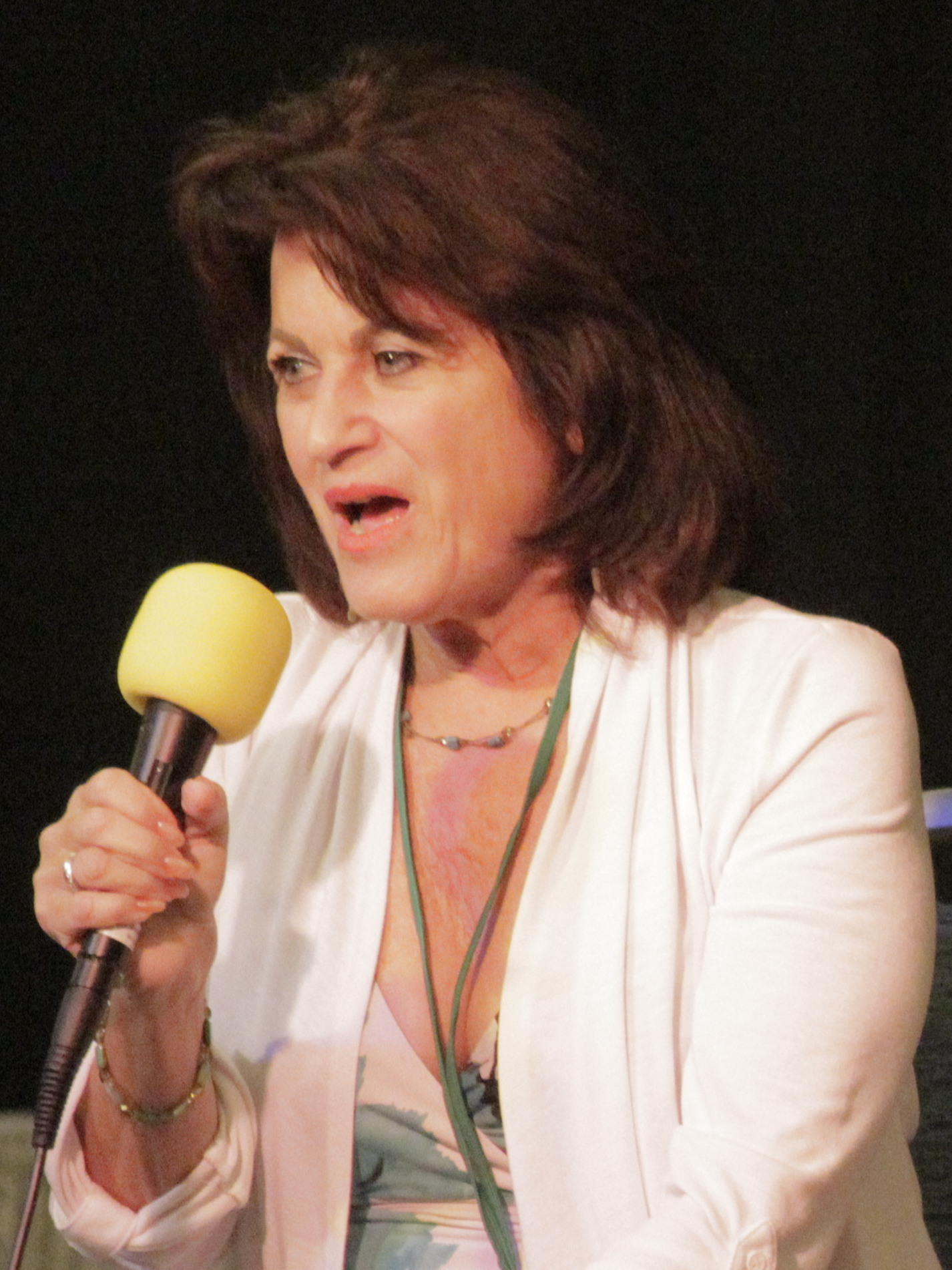
- Goodson at the Florida Supercon in 2013
- Born: Brooklyn, New York, U.S.
- Other names: Bertha Greene; Shirley Roberts
- Occupation: Voice actress
- Years active: 1979–present
- Children: 1
- Website: web.archive.org/web/20200125124346/http://www.barbaragoodson.com/

Barbara Goodson is an American voice actress who has done voice-over work in cartoons and shows. Her best-known role was providing the English dub voice of the main villain Empress Rita Repulsa in the Power Rangers television series, starting with Mighty Morphin Power Rangers, and including Power Rangers Zeo, Turbo: A Power Rangers Movie, and Power Rangers in Space.

== Early life ==
Goodson was born in Brooklyn, New York.

== Career ==
In 1988, Goodson did her rendition of Red Fraggle in Fraggle Rock: The Animated Series.

In the 1990s, Goodson was known for voicing Rita Repulsa in Mighty Morphin Power Rangers and her other appearances in Power Rangers Zeo, Turbo: A Power Rangers Movie, and Power Rangers in Space. Other Power Rangers characters she has played include Prince Sprocket and Orbus in Power Rangers Zeo, and Mandilok in Power Rangers Wild Force. She also voiced Ladyborg in Beetleborgs Metallix, and Mother Talzin on Star Wars: The Clone Wars, receiving for the latter a Best Actress award from the website Behind The Voice Actors.

She also voiced Darling since Lady and the Tramp II: Scamp's Adventure, HBO's Adventures of Tom Sawyer as Tom and FLCL as Naota. For her work in the series CloudBread, in which she is a cast member as Wooley, Ruiz, Grandma, and Teacher Ellie, she was nominated for Best Children's Programming in 2011 for an Annie Award. She was also awarded an Earphones Award for narrating Blair Clemons in the Time/Warner book On a Night Like This.

She reprised her role as Rita Repulsa revived into a robotic body in a 30th anniversary Power Rangers special Mighty Morphin Power Rangers: Once & Always.

== Filmography ==
=== Animation ===
- Adventures of the Great Wolf Pack - Grabapple
- Avatar: The Last Airbender – Song's mother
- Bernadette: Princess of Lourdes – Various characters
- Buttons & Rusty – Buttons Bear
- Chucklewood Critters – Buttons, Christy, Frisky
- Fraggle Rock – Red Fraggle, Wingnut Doozer
- G.I. Joe: A Real American Hero – Various characters
- Goldengirl – Onyx, Moth Lady
- High Guardian Spice – Parnelle
- Jin Jin and the Panda Patrol – Jin Jin
- The Kids from Room 402 – Various characters
- Kissyfur – Various characters
- The Legend of Korra – Shaman
- Lego Star Wars: Terrifying Tales – Mother Talzin
- Lucky Luke – Three Hillbilly Women
- Miraculous: Tales of Ladybug & Cat Noir – Marianne Lenoir/Backwarder
- Mr. Pickles – Agnes Gobbleblobber/Steve the Gimp
- OK K.O.! Let's Be Heroes – Small Calf Demon, Monster
- Saban's Adventures of Oliver Twist – Princess Annushka
- The Ren & Stimpy Show – High Fashion Log Girl
- The Secret Files of the Spy Dogs – Various characters
- Spider-Man: The Animated Series – Dr. Ashley Kafka
- Star Wars: The Clone Wars – Mother Talzin
- What's with Andy? – Various characters
- Wildfire – Various characters
- Wisdom of the Gnomes – Various characters
- The Wizard – Billy
- Wolf Rock TV – Mayor's Wife
- Alien Xmas – Z
- Zak Storm – Xibalba

=== Live-action ===
- Better than Us – Elena Vladimirovna (English Dub)
- Beetleborgs Metallix – Ladyborg (voice)
- Hallo Spencer – Galactica (voice)
- MMPR/PRZ/PRIS – Rita Repulsa (voice), Prince Sprocket, Orbus (voices, credited), Mantis, Somnibot, Turbanshell (voices, uncredited)
- Power Rangers Lost Galaxy – Icy Angel (voice)
- Power Rangers Time Force – Notacon (voice)
- Power Rangers Wild Force – Mandilok (Upper Mouth) (voice)
- Violetta – Olga (voice: English dub)

=== Anime ===
- Ah! My Goddess: Flights of Fancy – Sentaro Kawanishi
- Ai Yori Aoshi – Aoi's Mother
- Angel Tales – Toki
- Arc the Lad – Boy, Boy B, Nurse, Old Woman, Waitress
- Armitage: Dual-Matrix – Yoko's Kindergarten Teacher
- Around the World with Willy Fog – Additional voices
- Bakuto Sengen Daigunder – Akira Akebono
- Barefoot Gen – Ryuta Kondo (Streamline Pictures)
- Battle B-Daman – Terry (2nd voice)
- B-Daman Crossfire – Derek Watari
- Beyblade X – Quinn Manju
- Biohunter – Mary
- Black Jack – Koichiro (young), Old Woman
- Blade of the Immortal – Fake Yaobikuni
- Bleach – Numb Chandelier
- Cardcaptors — Yuuki Tachibana
- Crimson Wolf – Mizuo Mashio
- Crying Freeman – Bayasan (Streamline Dub)
- Coppelion – Granny Ayame
- Cowboy Bebop – Pet Shop Owner
- Cyborg 009 – Cathy, Jimmy's Mother (2001 series)
- Daigunder – Akira Akebono
- Dandadan – Turbo Granny
- Daphne in the Brilliant Blue – President
- DearS – Oihiko's Mom
- Demon Slayer: Kimetsu no Yaiba – Grandmother
- Digimon – T.K.'s Mom, additional characters
- Dogtanian and the Three Muskehounds – Milady
- Doomed Megalopolis – Keiko
- Dragon Ball – Son Goku (Zero) (Harmony Gold dub)
- Dual! Parallel Trouble Adventure – Akane Yamano
- El Hazard: The Magnificent World 2 – Various
- El Hazard: The Wanderers – Millie
- Ergo Proxy – Lacan
- Eureka Seven – Coda
- Fafner in the Azure – Ayano Kondou
- The Fantastic Adventures of Unico – Unico
- Final Fantasy: Legend of the Crystals – Queen Lenna
- Figure 17 – Rin Ibaragi
- FLCL – Nandaba Naota
- FLCL: Progressive – Tami Hanae
- Flint the Time Detective – Petra Fina/Mrs. Iknow, Getalong
- Fushigi Yūgi – Miboshi, Subaru
- Gad Guard – Kyoko Sanada
- Gate Keepers – Kazuko Ukiya
- Geneshaft – Hyun, Judy
- G-Force: Guardians of Space – Agatha June, Pee Wee
- Godzilla Singular Point — Tilda Mira
- Ghost in the Shell: Stand Alone Complex – Maruta, Prime Minister Yoko Kayabuki
- Grenadier – Teppa Aizen (boy)
- Grimm's Fairy Tale Classics – Various
- Gun Frontier – Erole
- Gurren Lagann – Kunba
- .hack//Legend of the Twilight – Katsuyuki
- Haré+Guu – Sharon
- Hello Kitty's Paradise – Moley
- Here is Greenwood – Mrs. Ikeda (Media Blasters dub)
- Honey and Clover – Aunt Akiko, Dr. Satsuki
- Honeybee Hutch – Various
- Hunter × Hunter 2011 series – Gon's Great-Grandmother Old Lady (Ep. 2)
- Immortal Grand Prix – Misaki
- JoJo's Bizarre Adventure: Stardust Crusaders – Enya Geil
- Jungle de Ikou! – Rongo/Takuma
- Kamichu! – Mitsubamaru
- Karas – Tsuruta
- Kekkaishi – Tokiko Yukimura
- Kikaider – Masaru Komyoji
- Knights of Sidonia – Lalah Hiyama
- Koi Kaze – Woman
- Kyo Kara Maoh! – Doria, Queen Bear Bee (Ep. 18), Rick, Conrad (Young)
- Leave it to Piyoko! – Additional voices
- The Legend of Black Heaven – Mother
- Little Women – Aunt March
- Love Hina – Mitsune Konno
- L/R: Licensed by Royalty – Sean
- Lupin III: Part II – Madame X
- Lupin III: The Castle of Cagliostro – Clarisse d'Cagliostro (Young; Streamline dub)
- Magi: The Labyrinth of Magic – Baba (Eps. 4 & 5)
- Magic Knight Rayearth – Alcyone, Sang Yung
- Mars Daybreak – Elizabeth Liati
- Maple Town – Bobby Bear, Mama Rabbit, Mikey Mole
- Megazone 23 – Yui Takanaka (Streamline Dub)
- The Melody of Oblivion – Bocca's Mother, Kei, Nurse, Old Woman, President
- Mermaid Forest – Old Lady
- Mobile Suit Gundam: The 08th MS Team – Maria
- Monster – Mrs. Fortner
- Moribito: Guardian of the Spirit – Torogai
- My Favorite Fairy Tales – Additional voices
- Naruto – Grandma Sansho
- Naruto Shippuden – Chiyo, Shima
- Neo-Tokyo – Mother
- The New Adventures of Gigantor – Jimmy Sparks
- Noozles – Blinky, Kelly Brown
- One-Punch Man – Boy (Ep. 8), Shibabawa (Ep. 9)
- Otogi Zoshi – Narrator
- Outlaw Star – Additional voices
- Overman King Gainer – Martina Lee, Woman in Restroom
- Ox Tales – Moe the Mole, additional characters
- Panda! Go, Panda! – Various
- Paradise Kiss – Young George, Kozue Shimamoto
- Paranoia Agent – Sato
- Phoenix – Obaba, Boy
- Planetes – Fadlan's Daughter
- The Prince of Tennis – Sumire Ryuzaki
- Ramayana: The Legend of Prince Rama – Shoorpanakha
- Ranma ½ 2024 series – Cologne
- Rave Master – Chino, Fortune Teller
- Resident Evil: Degeneration – (PFBC) Female News Reporter, Female Zombie
- Ringing Bell – Chirin (lamb)
- Robot Carnival – Old Lady (Presence)
- Robotech – Marie Crystal, Sera (as Shirley Roberts)
- Rozen Maiden – Kazuki Shibasaki
- Rumiko Takahashi Anthology – Old Lady, Ruriko Tonegawa's Mother-in-law
- Rurouni Kenshin – Hana, Shougo and Saya's Mother
- Sailor Moon SuperS – Zirconia (Viz Media Dub)
- Samurai Champloo – Ogin, Madam, additional voices
- Samurai Girl Real Bout High School – Akira Kinomiya
- Scrapped Princess Baroness Bairach, Rita
- S-CRY-ed – Banka, Emergy Maxfell (Young). Girl at Party, Mama-san, Ms. Yoshii
- Shin-chan (Phuuz dub) – Max
- Shinzo – Additional voices
- Silent Möbius – Lebia
- Space Adventure Cobra – Jane
- Space Pirate Captain Harlock – Queen Regina
- Submarine 707R – Aldemis
- Tekkaman Blade – Star Summers
- Tenchi Muyo! GXP – Ryoko Balta
- The Boy and the Heron – Aiko (English Dub)
- The Third: The Girl with the Blue Eye – Ingrid
- The Twelve Kingdoms – Bishin, Gyokuyou, Takki
- Tweeny Witches – Credelle, Menow
- Twilight of the Dark Master – Takamiya
- Ultra Maniac – Bamboo
- Unico in the Island of Magic – Unico
- When They Cry - Higurashi – Keiichi's Mother/Aiko Maebara, Oryou Sonozaki, Suguru Okamura
- Wild Arms: Twilight Venom – Elizabeth, Ex Laila, Olivia, Pregnant Woman
- Windaria – Princess Veronica
- Witch Hunter Robin – Toudo's Mother
- Wolf's Rain – Hanabito
- Wowser – Bob Lovely, additional voices
- X – Saya Monou
- Yukikaze – Lynn Jackson
- Ys II: Castle in the Heavens – Bana
- Zillion – Apple
- Zillion: Burning Night – Apple

==== Films ====
- A Cat in Paris - Old Lady
- A Silent Voice – Ito Nishimiya
- Akira – Kaori, Takashi (Streamline dub), additional voices (Animaze dub)
- Aquarian Age the Movie – Hokuto
- Belle - Yoshitani
- Berserk: The Golden Age Arc III – Descent – Griffith (Young), Old Fortuneteller
- Big City Greens the Movie: Spacecation - Mrs. Kay, additional voices (voices)
- Birdboy: The Forgotten Children – Dinky's Mother, Mama Bir
- The Boy and the Heron - Aiko
- Laputa: Castle in the Sky – Pazu, Madge (original English dub) (as Bertha Greene)
- Cats Don't Dance – Various characters
- Catnapped! – Queen, Toru's Friend
- Cowboy Bebop: The Movie – Old Woman
- The Dalton on the Run – Additional Voices
- Fist of the North Star – Alei
- Fly Me to the Moon – Maggot 3
- Katy Caterpillar – Katy, Denise
- Kiki's Delivery Service – Kiki's Mother, additional voices (Streamline Dub)
- Lady and the Tramp II: Scamp's Adventure – Darling
- Lu over the Wall – Granny Octopus
- Metropolis – Emmy
- Mighty Morphin Power Rangers: Once & Always - Robo-Rita Repulsa (voice)
- Mobile Suit Gundam F91 – Nadia Ronah
- Ringing Bell – Chirin (lamb) (uncredited)
- Rover Dangerfield – Farm Voices
- Tenchi Muyo!: The Daughter of Darkness – Child Yosho, Yuzuha
- The Bad Guys - Old Lady
- The Fantastic Adventures of Unico – Unico (uncredited)
- The Rose of Versailles - Maron Glaicé Mont Blan (Netflix dub)
- Thumbelina: A Magical Story – Hoppy, Gladys (George's Wife/Hoppy's Mom), Croven, Aunt Ruth, The Human Witch, Bridesmaid #2 (uncredited)
- Unico in the Island of Magic – Unico (uncredited)
- Vampire Hunter D – Doris Lang (Streamline dub)
- Weathering with You – Fumi Tachibana (cameo)
- Zootopia – Bully

=== Video games ===
- Armored Core: Verdict Day — Various pilots, AI
- Brave Fencer Musashi — Kojiro
- Bugsnax — C.Clumby Clumbernut
- Dead Head Fred — Additional voices
- Demon Slayer: Kimetsu no Yaiba — The Hinokami Chronicles — Old Woman
- Disgaea Franchise - Laharl
- Elroy's Toy - Elroy
- Final Fantasy VII Remake — Marle
- Final Fantasy XIII — Cocoon Inhabitants
- Fire Emblem Heroes — Hel
- Grim Fandango — Lola
- Guild Wars Nightfall — Spearmarshal Kormir
- Naruto Shippuden: Clash of Ninja Revolution 3 — Chiyo
- Naruto Shippuden: Legends: Akatsuki Rising — Chiyo
- Naruto Shippuden: Ultimate Ninja 4 — Chiyo
- Naruto Shippuden: Ultimate Ninja 5 — Chiyo
- Naruto Shippuden: Ultimate Ninja Heroes 3 — Chiyo
- Naruto Shippuden: Ultimate Ninja Storm 2 — Chiyo
- Naruto Shippuden: Ultimate Ninja Storm 3 — Chiyo
- Naruto Shippuden: Ultimate Ninja Storm 4 — Chiyo
- Naruto Shippuden: Ultimate Ninja Storm Revolution — Chiyo
- Nier Replicant ver.1.22474487139... — Lighthouse Lady
- Persona 5 Royal — Shinya Oda
- Power Rangers: Battle for the Grid — Rita Repulsa
- Resonance of Fate — Theresa
- Shenmue III — Additional Cast
- Space Adventure Cobra — Dominique Royal, misc.
- The Bureau: XCOM Declassified — Nurse Campbell
- Warcraft 3: The Frozen Throne — Lady Vashj
- World of Warcraft: The Burning Crusade — Lady Vashj (Boss)

=== Documentary ===
- Adventures in Voice Acting – Herself
