= Kintama =

Japanese slang for testicles

Kintama (Japanese: 金玉, Hepburn: kintama; lit. 'golden balls') is a Japanese slang term for testicles, similar in use and concept to the English slang "family jewels". Sometimes it is used in the back slang form, tamakin.

== History ==
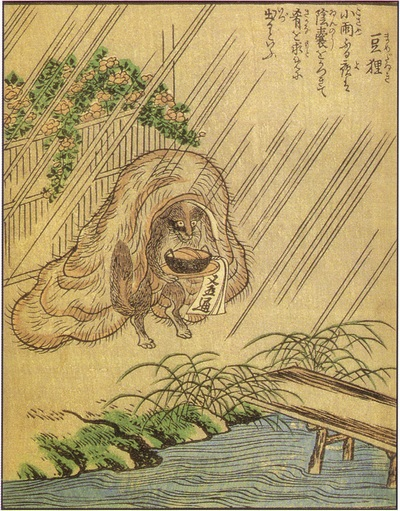
Tanuki sheltering from rain using its stretched scrotum, as depicted in Ehon Hyaku Monogatari

Use of the term kintama has been traced back to the Edo Period. According to folklore, the tanuki has magical shapeshifting abilities, including their oversized scrotums (as depicted in art), which the animals could use in multiple ways. In addition, the skin of the tanuki was used traditionally by workers in Kanazawa for the production of gold leaf, linking gold to tanuki and, by extension, testicles.
