= Dandadan =

Japanese manga series by Yukinobu Tatsu

- First tankōbon volume cover, featuring Momo Ayase (left) and Ken "Okarun" Takakura in his yōkai form (right)

ダンダダン
- Genre: Action; Romantic comedy; Supernatural thriller
- Manga
- Written by: Yukinobu Tatsu
- Published by: Shueisha
- English publisher: NA: Viz Media
- Imprint: Jump Comics+
- Magazine: Shōnen Jump+
- Original run: April 6, 2021 – present
- Volumes: 26
- Anime television series
- Dandadan (2024–present)
- Anime film
- Dan Da Dan: First Encounter (2024); Dan Da Dan: Evil Eye (2025)
- icon

Dandadan (ダンダダン), also written as Dan Da Dan, is a Japanese web manga series written and illustrated by Yukinobu Tatsu. It has been serialized in Shueisha's Shōnen Jump+ app and website since April 2021, with its chapters collected in 26 tankōbon volumes as of November 2026. The series follows two teenagers with supernatural powers fighting yōkai and aliens with help from multiple allies.

An anime television series adaptation, produced by Science Saru, aired from October to December 2024. A second season aired from July to September 2025. A third season is set to premiere in 2027.

== Plot ==
Momo Ayase is a high school girl who believes in ghosts but not aliens, while her fellow high schooler, Ken Takakura, whom Momo nicknames "Okarun", believes in aliens but not ghosts. In a bet to determine who is correct, the two decide to separately visit locations associated with both the extraterrestrial and the occult—Momo visiting the former, and Okarun the latter. Momo is abducted by a group of aliens who accidentally unblock her chakras, enabling latent psychic abilities. Meanwhile, Okarun becomes possessed by a spirit, and together with Momo's abilities, they use his possessed form to defeat the aliens.

The rest of the story follows Momo and Okarun as they ally with fellow students, friends, family, and new acquaintances to combat supernatural entities, including spirits and extraterrestrial beings, while also navigating the evolving romantic tension between Momo and Okarun. Initially, a central plot focuses on Okarun's quest to retrieve his missing testicles (kintama). After succeeding, the story then shifts to Momo when she becomes afflicted by a mysterious curse that gradually diminishes her physical size and erases her presence to those around her. This development drives the latter half of the plot, as the other characters work to undo the curse and restore Momo to her original state. Although Momo's curse is eventually lifted, she loses most of her memories in the process—including those of her time with Okarun and the others.

== Production ==
Prior to creating Dandadan, Yukinobu Tatsu worked as an assistant on Tatsuki Fujimoto's Chainsaw Man and Yuji Kaku's Hell's Paradise: Jigokuraku. The series was approved for serialization on Shōnen Jump+ during a meeting in Q2 2020. Tatsu delayed starting Dandadan until after both Chainsaw Man and Hell's Paradise: Jigokuraku concluded, as he wished to fulfill his assistant duties completely.

Tatsu frequently incorporates meal scenes following major events, a stylistic choice inspired by multiple sources. He cites the conviction that "hard work merits good food." This sentiment is echoed in the manga Jarinko Chie, which states that being hungry and alone is a terrible state. He also draws inspiration from the familial warmth of shared meals in Hayao Miyazaki films such as My Neighbor Totoro and Porco Rosso. Tatsu's focus was further influenced by his own experiences as a struggling assistant, recalling a time his mentor gave him 1000 yen to buy stir-fried pork and a coffee after work. Tatsu stated that he includes these scenes to provide readers with a sense of hope, in keeping with the series' entertainment purpose.

== Media ==
=== Manga ===
Written and illustrated by Yukinobu Tatsu, Dandadan started its serialization in Shueisha's Shōnen Jump+ app and website on April 6, 2021. Shueisha has compiled its chapters into individual tankōbon volumes. The first volume was released on August 4, 2021. As of November 4, 2026, 26 volumes have been released.

The series is simultaneously published in English on Shueisha's Manga Plus platform and on Viz Media's Shonen Jump website. In February 2022, Viz Media announced that they had licensed the series in print format; the first volume was released on October 11 of the same year.

=== Anime ===
A 12-episode anime television series adaptation, produced by Science Saru and directed by Fūga Yamashiro, was broadcast from October 4 to December 20, 2024, on the Super Animeism Turbo programming block on all JNN affiliates, including MBS and TBS. (Note: MBS and TBS listed the series premiere as 24:26 on October 3, 2024, which is effectively October 4 at 12:26 a.m. JST)

A second 12-episode season, directed by Abel Góngora and co-directed with Yamashiro, aired from July 4 to September 19, 2025. (Note: MBS and TBS listed the season premiere as 24:26 on July 3, 2025, which is effectively July 4 at 12:26 a.m. JST)

After the airing of the second-season finale, a third season was announced. It is set to premiere in 2027.

=== Stage play ===
On April 6, 2026, a stage play adaptation was announced, which will be directed by Imagine Ito, written by Shinjiro Kameda, and with music composed by Ryō Konishi. The cast includes Yuiri Murayama as Momo Ayase, Raimu Ninomiya as Ken "Okarun" Takakura, Hiroki Hyakuna as the transformed Okarun, Aoi Nakabeppu as Seiko Ayase, Riko Tanaka as Aira Shiratori, and Risa Yamazaki as Acrobatic Silky. It is scheduled to take place from August 26 to September 3, 2026, at the Nippon Seinenkan Hall in Tokyo and from September 11–13 at the Sky Theater MBS in Osaka.

== Reception ==
=== Sales ===
By November 2023, the manga had over 360 million views on the Shōnen Jump+ platform. The series had over 3.2 million copies in circulation by November 2023; over 4 million copies by October 2024; over 5 million by December 2024; and over 10 million copies by March 2025.

In the Billboard Japan Hot Shot Books 2026—which ranks the books with the greatest commercial growth and increase in popularity, the volume 22 ranked fifth.

In North America, the volumes of Dandadan were ranked on Circana (formerly NPD) BookScan's monthly top 20 adult graphic novels list since October 2022. They were also ranked on The New York Times' Graphic Books and Manga bestseller monthly list since July 2025.

=== Accolades ===
In June 2021, Dandadan was nominated for the seventh Next Manga Award in the Best Web Manga category and placed second out of 50 nominees. It ranked fourth on Takarajimasha's Kono Manga ga Sugoi! 2022 list of best manga for male readers. It was nominated for the 15th Manga Taishō in 2022 and placed seventh with 53 points. The series ranked first on both the Nationwide Bookstore Employees and Publisher Comics' Recommended Comics of 2022. The series ranked fourth in Tsutaya Comic Award 2022. The manga was nominated for Best Shōnen at the 30th Spanish Manga Barcelona Awards in 2024; it won in the same category at the 31st edition in 2025. It ranked 24th on the 2025 "Book of the Year" list by Da Vinci magazine. Along with Fate Rewinder, Cosmos, Dekin no Mogura, and Hirayasumi, the series won the 71st Shogakukan Manga Award in 2026.
