= The Snail Son =

Japanese folktale about a snail bridegroom

The Snail Son is a character that appears in Japanese folktales, as a type of enchanted husband that becomes disenchanted from his animal form and becomes a handsome man. Some tales are related to the cycle of Animal as Bridegroom or The Search for the Lost Husband.

== Summary ==
=== Mud-snail Son ===
Japanese scholar Seki Keigo titled Mud-snail Son a group of tales wherein a childless couple prays to a deity (uji-gami, Kannon or Yakushi) for a son; they either find a small snail (or other animal) and adopt it as their son, or a son is given to them as answer to their prayers. As the tale continues, the mud-snail marries a human maiden, either by trickery or performing honest work to her father. The snail son finds a magic mallet or is given one and uses it on himself (or his wife uses it) to turn him into a handsome man.

=== The Mud-snail Chōja ===
Scholar Kunio Yanagita collected the tale The Mudsnail Chōja from a teller in Sannohe-gun, Aomori. In this tale, an old couple works in their rice paddy, when they hear a voice telling them to rest. They leave the rice paddy, and a small mudsnail climbs on the man's knee and begs them to be adopted as their son. They agree. Some time later, the mudsnail rides a horse to the village and stops by a great house. The mudsnail asks for the daughter of the house as a bride for him - a request the residents deny. The mudsnail threatens to scatter boiling water, then hot ashes, if they continue to deny his request. The residents surrender their daughter, who the mudsnail places on his horse and rides with her back to the old couple. His adoptive parents are delight to their son's marriage, but the same cannot be said of the human wife. The mudsnail notices his wife's angry mood and asks her to take him to the rock where the old couple pounds straw and, once there, she must crush him. The human wife follows through with his request and crushes his snail body. He then becomes a handsome man.

=== The Snail Chōja ===
Seki Keigo collected and published in his book Folktales of Japan a tale titled The Snail Chōja, which has also been published as Snail's Tale. In this story, in the rich lands of a choja (a local wealthy man), lives a childless poor couple. The poor wife prays at the shrine of a water deity (Omizu-gamisama) for a son, and the deity answers her prayers: she gives birth to a tiny snail (or pond snail) they name Snail Boy. The Snail Boy, despite his small size and appearance, wants to help his human father in driving the horses, and his father, remembering that his son was a gift from the Water Deity, decides to indulge him. The Snail Boy drives the horses with the rice tax to the choja's house. The choja and the residents see the animals and deduce that the horses cannot have come by themselves. Then the Snail Boy tells the people he brought the rice from his parents and asks to be taken off the bag with care. The choja invites the Snail Boy to have dinner with them, and he offers one of his two daughters in marriage. The eldest daughter refuses to marry the snail, but the youngest agrees. They marry and the choja gives the Snail Boy and his parents a large dowry.

One day after the marriage, the human wife convinces the snail husband to go with her to the festival of Yukashi (on April 8). However, they stop before going to temple of Yukashisama (or Yakushi) to worship, and the snail asks her to go ahead without him. Time passes, and she loses sight of her snail husband and begins to look for him in the rice fields, by checking every snail - since it was April. She ends up dirtying her clothes from the mud and water of the rice paddies. A fine young man appears before her and reveals he was the snail, now transformed into human.

Keigo classified this tale as AT 425, "The Search for the Lost Husband".

== Analysis ==
=== Tale type ===
In Hiroko Ikeda's index of Japanese folktales, the character appears in the Japanese tale type 425A, "Mud-snail Son (Tsubu Musuko)", close to type 425 of the international Aarne-Thompson-Uther Index, "The Search for the Lost Husband", and its subtypes of animal bridegroom tales. In Ikeda's type, an animal son (a mud-snail, a snail, a slug, frog or snake) is born or given to human parents, marries a human maiden and asks her to disenchant him, either by smashing him with a hammer, pestle or stone, or stepping on him; in other tales, she crushes his shell, or he steals a hammer from the ogres and asks her to use it on him.

=== Motifs ===
As cited by Richard Dorson, researcher Tomiko Yokoyama studied the character of the pond snail in Japanese tales, and considered it a messenger from a water deity.

== Variants ==
=== Japan ===
==== Distribution ====
Seki Keigo stated that the tales of a snail husband are "widely distributed" in Japan, with 35 tales reported. Hiroko Ikeda, in her index of Japanese folktales, reported 36 tales. Keigo and Yanagita located variants from across Japan in the following regions: Akita, Aomori, Gumma, Hiroshima, Iwate, Kagawa, Kagoshima, Kochi, Kumamoto, Miyagi, Nagasaki, Niigata, Oita, Okayama, Shimane and Tokushima.

==== Regional tales ====
In a variant from Akita with the title The mudsnail and the girl, the snail husband gets a "mallet of long life" from the sea and asks his human wife to shake it to turn him into a human.

In a variant from Shimane titled The Snail Son-in-law, a slug is adopted by a poor old couple as their son. One day, the slug takes three grains of cooked rice and places them on the mouth of the daughter of the wealthiest man in town, and lies to her father that she stole its rice, so he demands her in return. The slug marries the woman, who gives him a needle. On the way to their house, the couple sees some demons quarreling; the slug prickles a demon with the needle and is given a magic mallet in return. The slug asks his human wife to use the mallet to turn him into a human man, and she does it.

In a Japanese tale translated by linguist Maurice Coyaud with the title Le fils escargot ("The Snail Son"), an old couple is childless. One day, the man goes to chop wood in the mountains, and finds a snail in the satchel with his food he hanged on a branch. He eats his lunch and watches the snail's movement, then asks the snail to be his and his wife's son, since they are childless. The man takes the snail home and his wife agrees to have the animal as their son. They feed the snail and live with him. Sometime later, the snail has grown large, and declares he will offer his services as a servant to their rich neighbour. The snail slides through the chimney and announces his intentions to be a servant. The rich neighbour accepts the snail servant, and he works around the house in sweeping the place and tending to the fire. He works there for three years. After this time, the rich man's beautiful daughter is being betrothed to a rich suitor. The snail asks for payment a handful of rice, which he places on the rich man's daughter's mouth. She feels an itch, and the suitor does not want her anymore. She marries the snail son, who decides to return to his parents' house. On the road, the snail sees the flowers in bloom and admires them with some verses, then asks his bride to take a stone and smash him, while screaming "Snail! Yassagassa!". She does so, and the snail turns into a handsome youth. The youth then bids the girl wash her face in a crystaline pond and she becomes just as beautiful as before. The now human snail son returns home to his parents and they live together. Coyaud sourced the tale to Echigo, and classified it as type AT 425A.

=== Philippines ===
In a Filipino tale from the Visayan with the title The Enchanted Shell, a couple prays to God for a son, even if he looked like a little shell. So a son is born to them, very small and looking like a shell - so they named him Shell. After some adventures frightening people, Shell tells his mother he wants to marry the daughter of a chief. His mother doubts her son's intentions, but he seems resolute in his decision. So the mother goes to the village chief to make her son's bid, and the chief's daughter does agree to marry the little shell. Enraged, the chief marries his daughter to the couple's son and expels her from the village to a hut outside the village. A week after the marriage, the little shell becomes a handsome man, for he was cursed into that form at birth by an evil spirit.

=== China ===
North American missionary Adele M. Fielde collected a Chinese tale titled The Man in a Shell: a woman prays to many gods to have a child. She eventually goes to the beach to pray to the Sea Dragon King. Insistent and frequent are her prayers that the Sea Dragon King decides to attend her, and the women gives birth to a son with a spiral shell. He grows up with the shell on his back, and eventually marries a human girl. One day, the woman asks her daughter-in-law about the snail husband: if he comes out of the shell at night or if he sleeps by the side of the conch. The girl answers that the husband takes off the shell at night. The woman hides the shell that night so that the youth remains human at all times, but he eventually finds the shell, wears it on his back and returns to the sea.

== Adaptations ==
Japanese author Junji Kinoshita adapted the tale Tsubu Musuko (translated as "Shellfish Son") in his book of Japanese folktales.

The story was also adapted as the book Tsubu the Little Snail by author Carol Ann Williams.

== See also ==
- Keong Emas (Golden Snail, Javanese folktale)
- Ureongi gaksi (The Snail Bride, Korean folktale)
- Sang Thong (Golden Conch, Thai folktale)
- Issun-bōshi
