= List of Dandadan chapters =

Cover of the first tankōbon volume

The chapters of the Japanese manga series Dandadan are written and illustrated by Yukinobu Tatsu. The series started in Shueisha's Shōnen Jump+ app and website on April 6, 2021. Shueisha has compiled its chapters into individual tankōbon volumes. The first volume was released on August 4, 2021. As of November 4, 2026, 26 volumes have been released.

The series is simultaneously published in English on Shueisha's Manga Plus platform and on Viz Media's Shonen Jump website. In February 2022, Viz Media announced that they had licensed the series in print format; the first volume was released on October 11 of the same year.

== Volumes ==
| No. | Original release date | Original ISBN | English release date | English ISBN |
|---|---|---|---|---|
| 1 | August 4, 2021 | 978-4-08-882599-1 | October 11, 2022 | 978-1-9747-3463-4 |
1. "That's How Love Starts, Ya Know!" (それって恋のはじまりじゃんよ, Sorette Koi no Hajimari jan yo); 2. "That's a Space Alien, Ain't It?!" (それって宇宙人じゃね, Sorette Uchūbito ja ne); 3. "It's a Granny Vs. Granny Clash!" (ババアとババアが激突じゃんか, Babā to Babā ga Gekitotsu jan ka); 4. "Let's Go to the John" (トイレにいこう, Toire ni Ikō); 5. "Kicking Turbo Granny's Ass" (ターボババアをぶっ飛ばそう, Tābo Babā o Buttobasō)
Momo Ayase, a high school student obsessed with actor Ken Takakura, befriends a nerdy boy she nicknames Okarun (instead of his actual name, Ken Takakura) who mistakes her kindness for a shared obsession with paranormal phenomena; while she believes in spirits, he believes in aliens, and they send each other to notorious places to prove their respective interests. At abandoned Negi Hospital, Momo is abducted by the extraterrestrial Serpoians; meanwhile, Okarun is cursed by Turbo Granny, a yōkai who has joined with a bound spirit and takes his penis. After rescuing each other, Momo uses her newly awakened psychokinetic power to suppress Okarun's curse, which gives him a depressed demon form with Turbo Granny's powers. Returning to the shrine she shares with her granny, Momo and Okarun battle the Flatwoods monster. When Momo's grandmother Seiko, aka disreputable spirit medium Santa Dodoria, returns and saves Momo from a possessed Okarun, she coaches the teens how to defeat Turbo Granny. Momo challenges Turbo Granny to a race and tricks her into sending her full spirit into Okarun; the bound spirit awakens and begins to pursue them as an immense freshwater crab.
| 2 | October 4, 2021 | 978-4-08-882804-6 | January 10, 2023 | 978-1-9747-3530-3 |
6. "A Craving for Crab" (カニ食べたくね, Kani Tabetaku ne); 7. "Hundred-KMPH Granny" (100キロババアだろ, Hyaku Kiro Babā Daro); 8. "Let's Eat Crab" (カニ食べよう, Kani Tabeyō); 9. "Missing Each Other" (会えないじゃん, Aenai jan); 10. "Like, Where Are Your Balls?" (タマはどこじゃんよ, Tama wa Doko jan yo); 11. "You're a Rotten Tangerine, Ain't Ya?" (腐ったみかんじゃね, Kusatta Mikan ja ne); 12. "Seems He Finally Realized She's Cute" (かわいいって気付いたっぽい, Kawaii tte Kidzuita ppoi); 13. "A Dangerous Woman Arrives" (ヤベー女がきた, Yabē Onna ga Kita); 14. "'Acrobatic Silky' Is Kinda Long" (アクロバティックサラサラって長くね, Akurobatikku Sarasara tte Nagaku ne)
Momo loses her grasp on Turbo Granny during the pursuit, but manages to grab the recombined spirit crab-human, electrocuting it on an overhead line. The next day, after a series of misunderstandings, Okarun and Momo accidentally kiss. After Okarun learns that his penis was returned but his testicles are now missing, Seiko forces Turbo Granny's consciousness out of him into a maneki-neko doll; he retained her spiritual powers, and they strike a deal to return those powers in exchange for his restoration. However, Turbo Granny lost them after changing them to golden balls (kintama); fellow student Aira Shiratori picked up a kintama by accident, awakening her spiritual power, and Aira mistakes Momo as a devil. However, Aira's awakening also makes her visible to the Acrobatic Silky yōkai, who proceeds to swallow Okarun, Aira, and Momo; Momo burns her from inside, setting the trio free.
| 3 | December 3, 2021 | 978-4-08-882854-1 | April 11, 2023 | 978-1-9747-3531-0 |
15. "Let's Just Call Her 'Acro-Silky'" (アクサラって呼ぼう, Akusara tte Yobō); 16. "Acro-Silky" (アクさら, Akusara); 17. "To a Kinder World" (優しい世界へ, Yasashii Sekai e); 18. "Eat Some Somen Noodles or Something" (そうめんでも食べよ, Sōmen demo Tabeyo); 19. "I've Got This Funny Feeling" (なんかモヤモヤするじゃんよ, Nanka Moyamoya Suru jan yo); 20. "They're, Like, Back Again" (また来たじゃんよ, Mata Kita jan yo); 21. "Gotta Put On Some Clothes!" (服が着たい, Fuku ga Kitai); 22. "Momo Still Has Some Pent-Up Feelings" (モモちゃんまだモヤモヤしてます, Momo-chan Mada Moyamoya Shitemasu); 23. "You're Bothered, Aren't You?" (気にしてるじゃんか, Ki ni Shiteru jan ka)
Momo and Okarun defeat Silky, but Aira dies; to revive her, Momo transfers Silky's aura to Aira, and Momo empathizes with both after learning their similarly tragic family histories. After sharing a meal together, Aira insists Momo is a demon and vows to break Momo's hold on Okarun. At school, Momo catches Okarun and Aira in a compromising posture, which occurred after Aira confessed her feelings to him because of her romantically awkward notions. The Serpoians return, flooding the school to aid their mercenaries: two aliens similar to a plesiosaur and a mantis shrimp. All three humans fight ineffectively on their own, even after Aira and Okarun draw on their yōkai powers as the Silky and Turbo Granny, respectively. Okarun is stripped naked and the Serpoians attempt to harvest his sex organs. Momo finds an effective teamwork strategy, but the Serpoians, having tired of their gig workers' incompetence, have merged into a single aquatic monster.
| 4 | March 4, 2022 | 978-4-08-883046-9 | July 11, 2023 | 978-1-9747-3744-4 |
24. "Merge! Serpo Dover Demon Nessie!" (合体！セルポドーバーデーモンネッシー！, Gattai! Serupo Dōbā Dēmon Nesshī!); 25. "It Makes Your Heart Race, Don't It?" (ドキドキじゃんよ, Dokidoki jan yo); 26. "We Picked Up a Kappa Monster" (河童を拾いました, Kappa o Hiroimashita); 27. "Have You Ever Seen a Cattle Mutilation?" (キャトルミューティレーションを君は見たか, Kyatoru Myūtirēshon o Kimi wa Mita ka); 28. "That's a Premonition About the Turmoils of Love" (ラヴ波乱の予感じゃんよ, Ravu Haran no Yokan jan yo); 29. "First Love" (初恋の人, Hatsukoi no Hito); 30. "Don't Give Up!" (あきらめるなよ！, Akirameru na yo!); 31. "The Life of an Anatomical Model" (人体模型の生活, Jintai Mokei no Seikatsu); 32. "Let's Go to the Cursed House" (呪いの家へレッツゴー, Noroi no Ie e Rettsu Gō)
After the trio defeat the merged Serpoian-Nessie-mantis creature, they wake up in school, naked, damaging their social reputations. Aira and Momo find a grudging respect, and bring the wounded mantis shrimp to Granny Seiko, who denies his alien nature and calls him a kappa, but treats him and finds that cow milk will heal him and his son, Chiquitita. That night, Momo answers the door to find her childhood friend and first love, Jin Enjoji (Jiji), who has come to live with them while his parents are hospitalized. Once Jiji began to see spirits, his parents became sick; after multiple failed exorcisms, he was directed to contact Seiko, which she delegates to Momo. At school, Jiji is popular and Momo banters with him, making Okarun feel lonely. When an anatomical model runs by and Momo spots what they think is a kintama, they catch the model, named Taro, and reunite him with his love, a female anatomical torso named Hana. Taro's declaration of love gives Okarun the courage to fight for Momo. Okarun, Jiji, and Momo travel to Jiji's cursed house.
| 5 | May 2, 2022 | 978-4-08-883103-9 | October 10, 2023 | 978-1-9747-4059-8 |
33. "Better Decide Which One's Into Her" (どっちが好きか決めようや, Dotchi ga Suki ka Kimeyō ya); 34. "The Kito Family Is Coming" (鬼頭家が来る, Kitō-ke ga Kuru); 35. "Where's the Tsuchinoko Monster?" (ツチノコはどこ, Tsuchinoko wa Doko); 36. "The Kito Family's Old Lady" (鬼頭家のババア, Kitō-ke no Babā); 37. "Like, This Is the Legend of the Giant Snake" (大蛇伝説ってこれじゃんよ, Orochi Densetsu tte Kore jan yo); 38. "Mongolian Death Worms Are Deadly" (モンゴリアンデスワームはやばい, Mongorian Desu Wāmu wa Yabai); 39. "The Evil Eye" (邪視, Jashi); 40. "Contract" (契約, Keiyaku)
Momo goes to the hot springs, leaving the boys alone at the house, where they bicker and bond over her. After finding a secret room, a group of middle-aged women arrive; they are the landlords from the Kito family. Momo is similarly beset by middle-aged Kito men, but she is rescued by Turbo Granny. On the way back to the house, Momo visits the Tsuchinoko shrine and meets the priest, who relates a local legend: historically, villagers sacrificed children to pacify a giant snake, which kept a volcano quiescent; the Kito family attempt to sacrifice the trio at the house, which was built on the site of the ancient altar. Falling into a pit below the house, they spot the creature, which Turbo Granny realizes is a Mongolian death worm. Driven by its psychic energy, Okarun and Momo keep trying to hurt themselves; they resume normal thoughts in the presence of Jiji's spirit, which he learns was one of the sacrificed children. The spirit hates the Kito family; sympathizing with its loneliness, Jiji welcomes it inside himself, but it is an Evil Eye yōkai, untrustworthy and violent to humans.
| 6 | August 4, 2022 | 978-4-08-883208-1 | January 9, 2024 | 978-1-9747-4283-7 |
41. "Jiji the Prodigy" (天才ジジ, Tensai Jiji); 42. "Escape! Multistage!" (脱出！多段式！, Dasshutsu! Tadanshiki!); 43. "You Won't Get Away with This!" (ゆるさねえぜ, Yurusa nē ze); 44. "This House Is a Damn Eyesore" (目障りな家じゃんよ, Mezawari na Ie jan yo); 45. "It's a Pump" (ポンプです, Ponpu Desu); 46. "Put That Fire Out" (消火しよう, Shōka Shiyō); 47. "That's, Like, Way Deadly" (やば過ぎじゃんよ, Yabasugi jan yo); 48. "That UFO Is Awesome" (UFOすげえ, Yūfō Sugē); 49. "He's, Like, Sealed" (封印じゃんよ, Fūin jan yo)
The athletic Evil Eye/Jiji targets Momo and Turbo Granny, but Okarun protects them and throws Momo to the surface, where she sets the house aflame. Okarun and Evil Eye fight as the wounded worm spews venom; as the fire department pours water on the house, the worm surfaces and is consumed in sunlight, then regurgitates the Kito family. As the volcano erupts, Momo uses the worm's body as a hose to divert water onto the lava. The Tsuchinoko shrine priest defends her from the Kito matriarch. All three unite to face the Evil Eye; he is delayed by the mantis shrimp and then defeated by Seiko and Taro. Taro seals the Evil Eye inside his shell, which is lined with ofuda amulets. Chiqutita continues fighting the lava from aboard their flying saucer and lifts a ball of worm phlegm from underground, which protected Okarun and Turbo Granny. Sharing a meal of oden together, Seiko discovers that hot water will turn the Evil Eye back to Jiji, and cold water reverts to Evil Eye.
| 7 | October 4, 2022 | 978-4-08-883270-8 | April 9, 2024 | 978-1-9747-4339-1 |
50. "Let's All Carry Around Hot Water" (みんなでお湯を持とう, Minna de Oyu o Motō); 51. "We Can All Stay There Together!" (みんなでお泊まりじゃんよ, Minna de Otomari jan yo); 52. "The Hayashi Performers Are Here" (囃子が来ました, Hayashi ga Kimashita); 53. "We Became a Family" (家族になりました, Kazoku ni Narimashita); 54. "Get a Part-Time Job" (バイトをしよう, Baito o Shiyō); 55. "Moe! Moe! Tri-beam!" (モエモエ気功砲, Moe Moe Kikōhō); 56. "Feeling Kinda Gloomy" (なんかモヤモヤするじゃんよ, Nanka Moyamoya Suru jan yo); 57. "Scary Dudes at School" (学校の怖いやつ, Gakkō no Kowai Yatsu); 58. "Symphony No. 6" (交響曲第6番, Kōkyō Kyoku Dai Roku-ban)
The crew go to visit Jiji's parents in the hospital; the names of the shrimp alien (Peeny-Weeny) and the Kito matriarch (Naki) are revealed and she declares that Momo is her enemy while unveiling herself as a Subterranean alien. As Okarun and Momo grow closer, she asks him and Aira to stay at the house and help control Jiji with hot water. Seiko starts an exorcism to separate the Evil Eye with the help of the heavy metal Hayashi band, but Jiji begs to let him stay, promising to play with the lonely spirit. After inadvertently wrecking the house as Evil Eye, Jiji begins training to control his chi. Momo starts a part-time job at a maid café; after an incident involving Momo and the Evil Eye, Okarun seeks to become stronger, but is denied fight training by Peeny-Weeny, who uses the name Mr. Penny while working at a local dairy farm. Turbo Granny volunteers to help Okarun become strong; accompanied by Aira, the three sneak into school at night, where Turbo Granny summons musical spirits to train their sense of rhythm.
| 8 | January 4, 2023 | 978-4-08-883370-5 | July 16, 2024 | 978-1-9747-4601-9 |
59. "Symphony No. 9" (交響曲第9番, Kōkyō Kyoku Dai Kyū-ban); 60. "You Can Do It, Okarun!" (がんばれオカルン, Ganbare Okarun); 61. "The Evil Eye's Briefs" (邪視のブリーフ, Jashi no Burīfu); 62. "I Want to Rebuild the House" (家を建て直したい, Ie o Tatenaoshitai); 63. "School Life" (学生生活, Gakusei Seikatsu); 64. "The Secret Art of Being Attractive" (モテる秘訣はなんだ, Moteru Hiketsu wa Nan da); 65. "I Can't See Them!" (見えないじゃんよ, Mienai jan yo); 66. "Hey, It's a Kaiju" (怪獣じゃんよ, Kaijū jan yo); 67. "The Kaiju's Wicked Strong" (怪獣はめちゃ強い, Kaijū wa Mecha Tsuyoi)
Okarun and Aira defeat the musician tulpas and return to the house, where Okarun challenges the Evil Eye and enters a contract to fight him exclusively; this eliminates the threat to all humans but the house was completely demolished. Peeny-Weeny and Chiquitita help rebuild it using alien nanotechnology. Jiji slips into the Evil Eye, but his muttered threats are treated as a joke. An awkward male classmate seeks romantic advice from Okarun, who is defended by the class rep from Momo over what she sees as Momo's bullying. Okarun, Momo, and the awkward student investigate the apartment block ghost, which they learn is a kaiju wearing a retroreflector suit to appear invisible. As it rampages through the city, they escape back to the shrine, where Okarun devises a plan to defeat it using the alien nanotechnology.
| 9 | March 3, 2023 | 978-4-08-883414-6 | October 15, 2024 | 978-1-9747-4897-6 |
68. "Kinta's Imagination" (金太のイメージ, Kinta no Imēji); 69. "Clash! Space Kaiju vs. Giant Robot!" (激突！宇宙怪獣対巨大ロボ！, Gekitotsu! Uchū Kaijū Tai Kyodai Robo!); 70. "This Is How You Beat a Kaiju, Okay?" (怪獣の倒し方はこれじゃんよ, Kaijū no Taoshikata wa Kore jan yo); 71. "I'm Sick of Robots and Kaiju!" (ロボットも怪獣もこりごりだ, Robotto mo Kaijū mo Korigori da); 72. "Somebody, Please Translate" (だれか翻訳してくれ, Dareka Honyaku Shitekure); 73. "Let's Eat Some Takoyaki" (タコヤキを食べよう, Takoyaki o Tabeyō); 74. "Let's Go to School" (学校へ行こう, Gakkō e Ikō); 75. "Ran Into Someone Deadly" (やべえ奴に遭遇しました, Yabē Yatsu ni Sōgū Shimashita); 76. "What Do We Do With Her?" (どーするこいつ, Dō Suru Koitsu)
Okarun's plan calls for transforming the house through visualization; the awkward classmate, Kinta Sakata, succeeds with a daibutsu mecha he pilots. Working together, Kinta, Momo, and Aira defeat the kaiju with a powerbomb, causing it to shrink and reveal it is a suit piloted by a female alien, who then kisses Okarun. They take her to Peeny-Weeny, who uses a glitchy translator mask to learn her name is Vamola; she is seeking someone powerful enough to defeat her, who she will then marry. At Negi Hospital, the Serpoians meet an invading, lizard-like alien, which overwhelms them. Vamola learns to talk while walking to school with Momo and demonstrates the kintama is not Okarun's; detouring through ruins, they encounter a kuchisake-onna (slit-mouthed woman) yōkai, who Momo dispels. At school, Vamola is assigned to Class C with Okarun, and the class rep bars Momo and Aira from visiting, to their frustration.
| 10 | May 2, 2023 | 978-4-08-883503-7 | December 17, 2024 | 978-1-9747-4984-3 |
77. "This Person Is a Pain in the Butt" (めんどくせえ奴, Mendokusē Yatsu); 78. "A Pulse-Pounding Night" (ときめきナイトじゃんよ, Tokimeki Naito jan yo); 79. "Just Who the Heck Is This Person?" (こいつは一体何者なんだよ, Koitsu wa Ittai Nanimono Nanda yo); 80. "Ran Into Some Deadly Dudes 2" (やべえやつらに遭遇しました2, Yabē Yatsura ni Sōgū Shimashita 2); 81. "What Do We Do About These Deadly Dudes?" (どうしようやべえやつら, Dō Shiyō Yabē Yatsura); 82. "Number One Deadliest Dude" (一番やべえやつ, Ichiban Yabē Yatsu); 83. "At Work" (バイト中, Baito-chū); 84. "Annoying Dudes" (ムカツクやつら, Mukatsuku Yatsura); 85. "The Power of Nessie" (ネッシーの力, Nesshī no Chikara)
Seiko explains Momo's "pomade" spell only temporarily sent away the invincible yōkai, named Reiko Kashima, and to keep Momo safe, she is barred from being outside or near an uncovered mirror for a week between 10 PM and 5 AM. That night, Kashima attempts to lure Momo outside by pretending to confess Okarun's love, and keeps her awake by pounding the windows. The invading aliens are physically similar to octopus, piloting mecha suits, including the lizard-like leader and others. Silky and Evil Eye are knocked out quickly but manage to escape through the sewers; after dropping Vamola off at the shrine, Turbo Okarun is also defeated and his remaining testicle is extracted. At the maid café, Momo is pinned down by a horde of clones, who call Vamola a scout; a Serpoian teams up with Momo to repossess the clones, and she learns to use the moe-moe tri-beam to defeat an extradimensional alien.
| 11 | August 4, 2023 | 978-4-08-883599-0 | February 4, 2025 | 978-1-9747-5180-8 |
86. "I Just Wanna Leave Already" (早く帰りたいじゃんよ, Hayaku Kaeritai jan yo); 87. "Can Never Sleep at a Manga Cafe" (マンガ喫茶は眠れない, Manga Kissa wa Nemurenai); 88. "Spy" (スパイ, Supai); 89. "Argument" (ケンカ, Kenka); 90. "What're We Gonna Do?" (どーするかねえ, Dō Suru ka nē); 91. "Initiate! The Road to Counterattack!" (始動！逆襲への道！, Shidō! Gyakushū e no Michi!); 92. "Just Can't Sleep" (寝てられないじゃんよ, Neterarenai jan yo); 93. "Astral Body Adventure" (幽体離脱(アストラルボディ)の冒険, Asutoraru Bodi no Bōken)
The surviving Serpoian, named Rokuro, tells Momo the mysterious invading aliens must have warped to Earth via transmission systems housed in pyramids and kofun mounds. They rent a space at a manga café overnight, narrowly avoiding an attack from Kashima; returning to the shrine, Peeny-Weeny tells Momo all her friends are wounded after fighting aliens; she finds a ball similar to Vamola's in the mecha suit of one of the dead octopus-like aliens, and kicks her out, infuriated. When Rokuro learns Okarun's nut was taken, he realizes the 'globalist' alien invaders are an advance party which intend to use its power to bring their main force to Earth in five days. They morph the house into a car that Peeny-Weeny drives to the Negi Hospital site to train in secret, which goes poorly. Jiji uses his chi to silence Kashima overnight, allowing Momo to rest. Okarun awakens from his coma and, using astral projection, visits his friends and seeks out Seiko for help.
| 12 | December 4, 2023 | 978-4-08-883726-0 | April 1, 2025 | 978-1-9747-5227-0 |
94. "Please Tell Me How to Get Back Into My Body" (体の戻り方教えてください, Karada no Modorikata Oshiete Kudasai); 95. "Day of the Decisive Battle" (決戦の日, Kessen no Hi); 96. "Motivation" (やる気, Yaruki); 97. "What to Do About the Name?" (どーする名前, Dō Suru Namae); 98. "What to Do About My Beauty Treatment" (どーする美容, Dō Suru Biyō); 99. "My Turn" (おれのターン, Ore no Tān); 100. "Close That Gate" (ゲートを閉じろ, Gēto o Tojiro); 101. "Vamola" (バモラ, Bamora); 102. "Vamola 2" (バモラ2, Bamora 2)
Seiko and Turbo Granny cannot help, but coach Okarun how to return to his body. During the desperate fight with the globalist aliens, Jiji names his chi blast as the Evil Gun, multiplying its power and turning the tide. Kinta finds a note at the shrine asking for help and builds an Akira-esque motorcycle. Momo is sent ahead to close the Tokyo Tower warp gate; Vamola returns to help her, but the lizard-like mecha extracts Vamola from the kaiju suit and impales her. Momo grabs Vamola back and begins treating her. Connected by telepathic chips, the friends learn Vamola's background during a flashback: as the sole surviving Sumerian child, she was saved and raised by Banga after a battle with the globalist aliens which killed all Sumerian men. Banga's small squad tries to rejoin another surviving group, but it is a trap. During the fight they encounter a Big Mama, which is a globalist mecha factory that uses people as raw materials, and they watch it create the kaiju suit, a symbol of the Sumerian religion.
| 13 | January 4, 2024 | 978-4-08-883841-0 | June 3, 2025 | 978-1-9747-5511-0 |
103. "Vamola 3" (バモラ3, Bamora 3); 104. "Vamola 4" (バモラ4, Bamora 4); 105. "Banga" (バンガ); 106. "Vamola's Reasons" (バモラの理由, Bamora no Riyū); 107. "I've Decided on Takoyaki" (タコ焼き決定じゃんよ, Takoyaki Kettei jan yo); 108. "I'm Gonna Kick Ya Into Tomorrow" (蹴っ飛ばしてやるわい, Kettobashite Yaruwai); 109. "Mantis Shrimp's Calculation" (シャコの計算, Shako no Keisan); 110. "Wicked Power" (やばい力, Yabai Chikara); 111. "Everyone's Reconvened" (集まってきちゃった, Atsumattekichatta)
Banga, who was a royal cook before the war, attempts to enter the palace and activate the warp gate to escape; she liberates the imprisoned men and saves Vamola by donning the kaiju suit, using the last of the gate's energy to send her to Earth with the advice to find a kind, strong man to marry. Vamola succeeds by identifying Okarun, but guiltily realizes she also drew the globalists to attack the friends; Rokuro heals her and she carries on fighting the globalists with Momo. The other students and Peeny-Weeny defeat the advance squad, but Momo has a tough fight with the lizard-like mecha before Okarun returns; buoyed by reuniting with the rest of the students, they face off against the globalists, who have brought reinforcements.
| 14 | April 4, 2024 | 978-4-08-883897-7 | August 5, 2025 | 978-1-9747-5575-2 |
112. "Today Is a Tuesday" (今日は火曜日, Kyō wa Kayōbi); 113. "Wreck 'Em" (ブチ壊せ, Buchikowase); 114. "A Persistent Bastard" (しぶとい野郎, Shibutoi Yarō); 115. "It's Kinta's Turn Onstage" (金太の出番じゃんよ, Kinta no Deban jan yo); 116. "Howl, Great Kinta!" (唸れグレートキンタ, Unare Gurēto Kinta); 117. "Out of the Frying Pan" (一難去ってまた一難, Ichinan Satte Mata Ichinan); 118. "The Power of Reiko Kashima" (カシマレイコの力, Kashima Reiko no Chikara); 119. "That Note" (あの手紙, Ano Tegami); 120. "Reiko Kashima's Maiden Heart" (カシマレイコの乙女心, Kashima Reiko no Otomegokoro)
Although the reunited students quickly defeat most of the alien mecha, the lizard-like leader stands strong until Momo figures out its weakness, releasing a jellyfish-like alien which infiltrates Vamola's kaiju suit. Kinta arrives, reviving his Great Kinta battlemech to fight the hijacked Tokyo Skytree-wielding kaiju with a Tokyo Tower 'sacred sword' before defeating it with a spiraling powerbomb. Before the gate closes, a globalist fleet slips through. Kashima, appearing at 10 PM for Momo, experiences a flashback to the bombing of Tokyo and traps the fleet in her mirror before destroying it; after seeing Okarun and Momo's mutual love, she walks away. At the celebratory yakiniku barbecue, Rokuro shows up to thank Momo. A transformed Kashima vows to steal Okarun if Momo is not more honest and forthright with her love. Far away, Banga leads a squad of Sumerians towards Earth; eavesdropping on the Serpoians, Turbo Granny learns they have named the globalist aliens the Kur, who are hosting the mysterious Count Saint-Germain.
| 15 | July 4, 2024 | 978-4-08-884054-3 | October 7, 2025 | 978-1-9747-5792-3 |
121. "Who's This Person?" (こいつは誰だ, Koitsu wa Dare da); 122. "Let's Form a Club" (部活を作ろう, Bukatsu o Tsukurō); 123. "The Class Rep's Secret" (委員長の秘密, Iinchō no Himitsu); 124. "Ombusman" (オンブスマン, Onbusuman); 125. "Let's Do an Exorcism" (おはらいしようぜ, Oharai Shiyō ze); 126. "It's a Parade Float. It's a Festival. It's Ninomiya" (山車だ祭りだ二宮だ, Dashi da Matsuri da Ninomiya da); 127. "Float Performance Face-Off" (ひっかわせ, Hikkawase); 128. "Let's Be Idols" (アイドルやろうぜ, Aidoru Yarō ze); 129. "Kawabanga" (カワバンガ)
After Okarun's retrieved gonad is restored, Mr. Sanjome emerges from The Gates of Hell at the National Museum of Western Art in Ueno Park and becomes the faculty supervisor for the students' occult club; despite not having prior memories of him, everyone agrees he seems familiar. Class rep Rin Sawaki approaches Okarun and collapses under the weight of an ombusman yōkai; after she picked up the other missing kintama and turned it in to a kōban (police box), she began seeing spirits. The ombusman is Mai Kawabanga, Rin's childhood friend who shared a dream to become a junior idol before dying in a car crash. Seiko's remedy involves the Hayashi band and a dansha parade float; they fight through waves of animated Ninomiya Sontoku statues and Rin takes over for the lead singer after he is incapacitated, belting out an emotional song. Mai returns and they tearfully forgive each other; although not dispelled completely, Mai becomes a guardian spirit. Momo and Okarun convince Turbo Granny to help infiltrate the kōban, operated by humorless Officer Bega "the Demon", to learn who picked up the missing kintama.
| 16 | October 4, 2024 | 978-4-08-884227-1 | December 9, 2025 | 978-1-9747-5793-0 |
130. "Mission Impossible" (スパイ大作戦, Supai Daisakusen); 131. "It's, Like, Pride" (プライドじゃんよ, Puraido jan yo); 132. "Delinquents' Track Meet" (ヤンキー運動会, Yankī Undōkai); 133. "Where's Zuma?" (ズマはどこだ？, Zuma wa Doko da?); 134. "Deadly Magic Object" (やべえ呪物, Yabē Jubutsu); 135. "She Went and Entered It" (入っちゃったじゃんよ, Haitchatta jan yo); 136. "It's, Like, a Board Game" (これボードゲームじゃんよ, Kore Bōdo Gēmu jan yo); 137. "That Zuma Dude" (ズマってやつ, Zuma tte Yatsu); 138. "Start Game" (ゲームスタート, Gēmu Sutāto)
Turbo Granny fails to obtain any information, but they are helped by Rokuro, exiled as a defective clone; after a brief fight with Bega, he learns the missing kintama was picked up by Unji Zuma, a student at Renjaku, a local high school infamous for its delinquent students. A street gang from Renjaku tell Momo and Okarun that Zuma entered a detailed diorama filled with monsters a week ago; Zuma vowed to defeat the diorama-world using the power of the kintama. Momo inadvertently falls into the diorama-world, which is a board game named Danmanra. Although her telekinesis is disabled in Danmanra, she meets Zuma, who can use oil-paper umbrella-based yōkai powers when he holds the kintama. Zuma defeats a powerful knight boss but then loses the kintama and works with Momo to retrieve it, moving through an obstacle course guarded by frog shikigami. They are forced to play the color demon variant of tag, which requires them to touch the food announced by a massive chef boss.
| 17 | November 1, 2024 | 978-4-08-884259-2 | February 3, 2026 | 978-1-9747-6198-2 |
139. "Let 'Em Eat Cake" (ケーキ食わせろや, Kēki Kuwasero ya); 140. "How to Use Powers" (能力の使い方, Nōryoku no Tsukaikata); 141. "Eatin' Too Many Treats" (お菓子食い過ぎじゃんよ, Okashi Kuisugi jan yo); 142. "That's Enough of Sweets!" (甘いものはもういいぜ, Amai Mono wa Mō Ii ze); 143. "Let's Take a Break!" (休憩しようぜ, Kyūkei Shiyō ze); 144. "Let's Go on an Adventure!" (冒険しようぜ, Bōken Shiyō ze); 145. "Commence Castle Siege" (攻城戦開幕, Kōjō-sen Kaimaku); 146. "Castle Sieges Are Hard" (攻城戦は難しい, Kōjō-sen wa Muzukashii); 147. "It's a Megabrawl" (大乱闘じゃんよ, Dai Rantō jan yo)
Since Zuma exhausted his powers while fighting the knight boss, after retrieving the kintama, he passes it to Momo, who takes down the chef; they are awarded the Nom Nom Bongo (Death Pâtissier) game card, similar to a Pokémon card, which grants them powers from eating treats. Checking their pockets, they also have a Carmine (Dark Knight) card from the earlier fight, and realize they must defeat four bosses in total. After beating the next, Rock-hard Costinus (Medusa), they rest at an inn to prepare for their final challenge, which is to defeat an army guarding a castle and destroy the crystal within; the game uses a rock paper scissors scheme to determine weaknesses between four types of soldiers in the army. Okarun returns to the diorama with Rin and Turbo Granny while being pursued by Officer Bega. The street gang bursts into the diorama world, saving Momo and Zuma from defeat, and when that pair enter the castle, Okarun arrives, yelling not to break the crystal, but too late, as Zuma slices it in half.
| 18 | January 4, 2025 | 978-4-08-884340-7 | April 7, 2026 | 978-1-9747-6199-9 |
148. "Game Cleared" (ゲームクリア, Gēmu Kuria); 149. "That Devil, the Fairy-Tale Card" (悪魔のメルヘンカルタ, Akuma no Meruhen Karuta); 150. "This Guy's a Pain" (厄介なやつ, Yakkai na Yatsu); 151. "Get That Family Jewel Back" (金玉を取り戻せ, Kintama o Torimodose); 152. "Turbo Granny vs. 'Brella Boy" (ターボババアVSアンブレボーイ, Tābo Babā tai Anbure Bōi); 153. "Unji Zuma" (頭間雲児, Zuma Unji); 154. "Unji Zuma 2" (頭間雲児2, Zuma Unji 2); 155. "Unji Zuma 3" (頭間雲児3, Zuma Unji 3); 156. "'Brella Boy" (アンブレボーイ, Anbure Bōi)
Turbo Granny explains the diorama is a cursed tsuzura (wicker trunk); with the last guardian defeated, the sealed Fairy-Tale Card yōkai is released and transforms Zuma into the rampaging 'Brella (Umbrella) Boy yōkai. Momo is wounded; teaming up with Rokuro and Bega, Okarun takes the kintama away from 'Brella Boy and knocks him out, but Okarun stops when a spirit asks him to stop bullying his older brother. A flashback shows the disintegration of Zuma's family: after his father dies and they pile up insurmountable debt, his cheerful younger brother drowns trying to retrieve a beloved umbrella; he is left orphaned after his mother dies by leaping in front of a subway train after taking him on a final, fun outing to an amusement park. As a juvenile delinquent gang leader, he vows to smash the world to pieces, but is arrested by sympathetic Officer Bega, who shares similar tragic family losses, but instead refuses to surrender to his grief and vows to protect Zuma. When Bega tries to save a young, bullied boy from drowning in circumstances similar to his brother's death, Zuma acquires 'Brella Boy's powers and saves both Bega and the boy.
| 19 | April 4, 2025 | 978-4-08-884470-1 | June 9, 2026 | 978-1-9747-6367-2 |
157. "Masamichi Bega" (部賀正道, Bega Masamichi); 158. "That Kawabanga Girl" (カワバンガというやつは, Kawabanga to Iu Yatsu wa); 159. "Escape from the Cursed Trunk!" (脱出！！呪行李！！, Dasshutsu!! Noroi Kōri!!); 160. "The Power of the Demonic Fairy-Tale Card" (悪魔のメルヘンカルタの力, Akuma no Meruhen Karuta no Chikara); 161. "Saint-Germain, the Mysterious Man" (謎の男サンジェルマン, Nazo no Otoko Sanjeruman); 162. "Let's Blow the Demonic Fairy-Tale Card Away!" (悪魔のメルヘンカルタをぶっ飛ばせ！！, Akuma no Meruhen Karuta o Buttobase!!); 163. "Saviors, Don't Be Late!" (間に合え救出！！, Maniae Kyūshutsu!!); 164. "She's Gone All Little!" (小っちゃくなったじゃんよ, Chitchaku Natta jan yo); 165. "Family Jewels—Intact" (金玉コンプリート, Kintama Konpurīto)
'Brella Boy leaves the trunk, carrying the Fairy-Tale Card; Turbo Granny arranged to have Rin help the others escape. Mai turns Rin into an idol who manipulates gravity through song, drawing out the figurines. Okarun confesses his love to a stranded Momo as he leaves to fight the Fairy-Tale Card. Zuma stops breathing, having spent all his energy on the escape. The Fairy-Tale Card tries to acquire Rin's power but is prevented by Mai; it sets the gang members against each other by sowing discord and possessing their eyes, ears, and minds, but Count Saint-Germain halts the battle. As the Fairy-Tale Card brags on its apparently limitless powers, Rokuro and Okarun arrive, and Bega revives Zuma. Count Saint-Germain observes the cards are paired as in an uta-garuta deck and successfully coaches the team's attack. After the Fairy-Tale Card is defeated, the Count seizes its power; Bega and Zuma recount their recent miscommunications, Seiko treats the delinquents to all-you-can-eat yakiniku, and she vows to restore the curiously miniaturized Momo. Okarun's second kintama is restored and he returns Turbo Granny's power as promised; she leaves the group.
| 20 | July 4, 2025 | 978-4-08-884592-0 | August 11, 2026 | 978-1-9747-1647-0 |
166. "Is This a Little Fairy?" (これは小人妖精か, Kore wa Kobito Yōsei ka); 167. "Hey, There's Something There" (なんかいるじゃんよ, Nanka Iru jan yo); 168. "There's Someone Here" (なんか来たじゃんよ, Nanka Kita jan yo); 169. "Find the Culprit!" (犯人をさがせ！, Hannin o Sagase!); 170. "A Suspicious Woman" (怪しい女, Ayashii Onna); 171. "Corner the Perp!" (追い詰めろ犯人！, Oitsumero Hannin!); 172. "Those Pygmies Are Scary" (小人は怖い, Kobito wa Kowai); 173. "Corner the Criminal!" (犯人を追い詰めろ！, Hannin o Oitsumero!); 174. "Queen Sensei's Infirmary" (女王先生の保健室, Joō Sensei no Hokenshitsu)
Momo attends school in Vamola's pocket; arguing with Okarun in the library, Momo spots a Pygmy, a small man matching her size, wearing a conical hat. Okarun leaves for gym class and records impressive results during physical fitness testing, embarrassing popular student Hase. While searching for the small man, Kouki Yukishiro, a female student with yūrei-like disheveled hair, enters the library and calls for Momo to yield, wielding a small kozuka knife. Kouki felt invisible at home and school; she is being blackmailed over lewd selfies by a teacher she cannot identify. Count Saint-Germain stops Okarun and asks if Okarun yields to his superior knowledge; later, a disembodied voice tells Kouki her opponent must first yield before their powers can be taken. Momo and her friends pursue Kouki into an apparently empty student kitchen classroom; however, the classroom is filled with tiny, industrious Pygmies which only Momo can see, and she realizes that Kouki is directing their attack. When the Pygmies throw a desk at Okarun and Silky, Momo finds Kouki's hiding place and redirects the desk, striking Kouki. The Pygmies release Okarun and Silky, then escape with an unconscious Kouki; as the gang of friends pursues them, Kinta is stopped by the school nurse, Queen Sensei, who calls them bullies. Because Queen can see the Pygmies, she realizes that Kouki's accusations are false; Kouki explains how she was blackmailed.
| 21 | October 3, 2025 | 978-4-08-884720-7 | October 6, 2026 | 978-1-9747-6841-7 |
175. "So Who's the True Perp?" (真犯人は誰じゃんよ, Shinhannin wa Dare jan yo); 176. "Scattering the Bait" (餌を撒いとこ, Esa o Maitoko); 177. "Let's Do Some Kung Fu" (カンフーやったろうぜ, Kanfū Yattarō ze); 178. "The Power of a God" (神様の力, Kamisama no Chikara); 179. "This Seems Kinda Deadly" (なんかやばそうじゃんよ, Nanka Yabasō jan yo); 180. "The Owner of the Kozuka Knives" (小柄の持ち主, Kozuka no Mochinushi); 181. "Must Be the Influence of a Curse" (呪いの影響じゃね, Noroi no Eikyō ja ne); 182. "Something's Taken the Bait" (餌になにかが引っ掛かった, Esa ni Nanika ga Hikkakatta); 183. "So It's You!" (お前かい！, Omae kai!)
Kinta gives Kouki a hidden camera to catch the sinister teacher's instructions. Seiko meets with Payase and Kashimoto, asking if they know how to enlarge Momo. Kashimoto suggests the wish-granting hammer Uchide no kozuchi, then the three are attacked by jiangshi spirits and a hard iron minotaur. After Seiko kicks the minotaur, it shatters, revealing a middle-aged man under the command of a mysterious "orchestrator", wielding small kozuka knives, which Seiko recognizes as being from the cursed, stolen katana Asura. Bega, investigating the assault, is confused when the trio disappear before he can ask any questions. Back at school, teacher Miss Mika Adachi receives instructions from the orchestrator. After Hase is given two kozuka, he uses the white one and is possessed, and plans to take Okarun's powers using the black one. Zuma meets Momo and asks her how to lift the curse on the man they extracted from Danmanra, Daiki Hakono, who is aging at an unnatural rate. Count Saint-Germain offers help to a newly-arrived feminine alien with a cross-hair eye and a broken suit. Seiko takes Momo, Vamola, Jiji, Zuma, and Daiki to Shimane. Aira and Okarun return to the school with Kinta, who identifies the sinister teacher; they rush to the gym after Kouki's video feed abruptly ends. As Silky enters, she is confronted by students playing basketball using their severed heads, including Rin, followed by a mournful Mai. Outside, Kinta and Okarun are surprised by an explosion, followed by the arrival of two powerful enemies, the newly-arrived alien and Hase.
| 22 | January 5, 2026 | 978-4-08-884824-2 | December 1, 2026 | 978-1-9747-6909-4 |
184. "The Class Rep's Head" (いんちよ一の首, Inchiyo Ichi no Kubi); 185. "So You're the Perp!" (犯人はお前か！！, Han'nin wa Omae ka!!); 186. "Kouki Yukishiro's Power" (雪白幸姫の力, Yukishiro Kōki no Chikara); 187. "Kick the Crap Outta Murakami!" (村上をぶっ飛ばせ, Murakami o Buttobase); 188. "Okarun and Kinta" (オカルンと金太, Okarun to Kinta); 189. "Jumping Granny and Kung Fu Alien" (ジャンピングババアとカンフーエイリアン, Janpingu Babā to Kanfū Eirian); 190. "Merging Is What Makes Us Strong!" (合体したら強くなるでしょうか！！, Gattai Shitara Tsuyoku Naru Deshō ka!!); 191. "The Mistake" (間違え, Machigae); 192. "Departing for Shimane" (島根に出発, Shimane ni Shuppatsu)
Rin's head separated after she was slam-dunked by the dribblers; Silky forces Rin's head up through the basket, restoring her body, and Rin enters her powerful Idol form. Kouki reveals the "orchestrator" is gym teacher Takeshi Murakami, who blackmails students for their social media. The Pygmies set up a piano for Kouki's "Lord of the Flies" ability, which commands small animals and insects. Murakami is overcome by bugs and yields to Adachi, who takes his severed head dribbling powers, and after the insects deliver him to the gym, Aira/Silky punishes him. Outside, the alien with the cross-hair eye, wearing a new power suit with a skull and crossed swords on her mask, and a transformed Hase attack Okarun and Kinta, who don nanosuit armor. The alien had worked for a century to become a trusted ally to Hastur, the globalists' emperor, but her revenge plot was spoiled when Hastur was defeated by Okarun and the Family. Jealous Hase fights the frustrated alien for the right to defeat Okarun; Okarun grabs Hase and merges with Kinta, pile driving Hase, and the alien escapes. Adachi is punished and beaten for taking Murakami's power, but Officer Bega stops the attack. The Danmanra curse progresses: Zuma loses his sight, Daiki continues to age, and even Seiko and Vamola forget about Momo. The Kitos escape custody and arrive at the airport, pursuing Momo as the Family leave for Shimane.
| 23 | April 3, 2026 | 978-4-08-885012-2 | February 9, 2027 | 978-1-9747-7215-5 |
193. "You People?!" (お前らかい！, Omaera Kai!); 194. "We've Been Hijacked" (ハイジャックされました, Haijakku Saremashita); 195. "It's a Typhoon Direct Hit" (台風直撃じゃんよ, Taifū Chokugeki jan yo); 196. "Let's Blow Away That Typhoon" (台風をぶっ飛ばそう, Taifū o Buttobasō); 197. "Earthworm! Go!" (いけ！ミミズ！, Ike! Mimizu!); 198. "Smash the Typhoon's Eye!" (台風の目を叩け！, Taifū no Me o Tatake!); 199. "Clear Skies After the Storm" (台風一過, Taifū Ikka); 200. "Everyone's Whereabouts" (それぞれの行方, Sorezore no Yukue); 201. "Here We Are, in Shimane" (島根に着きました, Shimane ni Tsukimashita)
Masked Kito family members mount a mid-air ambush, but the Family hold them at bay and Vamola protects the passengers with an "empty space". The plane is damaged by flying frozen sharks and enters a storm, which Momo realizes is a Typhoon Human (台風人間, Taifū Ningen) cryptid. Momo, Jiji, and the Kitos fight the typhoon with their powers and a reconstituted Death Worm by hurling frozen sharks, attempting to expand the eye and cool the ocean. The typhoon cryptid sneezes, severing the worm, which Momo then flies like a windsock to battle the literal eye. However, Jiji's evil gun fails to dent the storm, so they dive back down and cool the ocean, dissipating the typhoon. The worm and the Kitos are swallowed by a massive shark, transporting them to the moon where they vow revenge on Momo; the friends jump off just in time and are retrieved under Vamola's directions. Daiki safely lands the aircraft as the oblivious passengers return to their seats. The Serpoians, who were responsible for the typhoon, prepare a large-scale invasion, fearing Momo could be taken by Count Saint-Germain. Back at school, Manjiro delivers a mysterious package to Okarun which contains an unremarkable pencil-sized iron rod called an "ogre club". When Momo and the others arrive at the temple in Shimane, the priest says the magic hammer was stolen by a phantom ninja thief, leading them to Matsue Castle.
| 24 | June 4, 2026 | 978-4-08-885125-9 | — | — |
202. "Where'd the Magic Hammer Go?" (打出の小槌はどこ行った, Uchide no Kozuchi wa Doko Itta); 203. "The Mysterious Man" (謎の男, Nazo no Otoko); 204. "Enenra, the Smoke Yokai" (煙々羅, En'enra); 205. "Spiral Training" (螺旋運動, Rasen Undō); 206. "Jiji and the Evil Eye" (ジジと邪視, Jiji to Jashi); 207. "What Even Is a Ninja?" (忍者とはなんじゃ, Ninja to wa Nanja); 208. "Who's the Real Ninja?!" (どっちが本物の忍者か決めようや！, Dotchi ga Honmono no Ninja ka Kimeyō ya!); 209. "All Alone" (ひとりぼっち, Hitoribotchi); 210. "After the Ritual" (儀式の後, Gishiki no Ato)
Seiko sees through the deception and tells Momo and Vamola to return to the temple; the "priest", The Red Baron, is a human with "Enenra" smoke yokai powers working with the Serpoians and a crew of chameleon-like humanoid ninjas. Red Baron defeats Granny Seiko, but she refuses to yield and an impatient Evil Eye breaks in; although the Evil Eye's attacks are ineffective, he manages to save Seiko. Because of Red Baron's repeated kicks aimed below the belt, Evil Eye derisively nicknames Red Baron "Nug Lover". Jiji's evil gun attack lands solidly using chirality. The Red Baron and the Evil Eye trade barbs; Evil Eye switches places rapidly with Jiji to defend and attack, respectively, and they inhale, compress, and then eject The Baron out through the temple roof. One by one, Vamola and Momo take out the ninjas and escape the castle, meeting Jiji and Seiko outside. When the castle reveals itself to be a ninja chameleon alien, Momo turns to fight it, telling Jiji to rush Seiko to the hospital, sacrificing her chance to lift the curse. Momo and Vamola infiltrate the structure by using the kaiju suit as a decoy, and detonate stolen bombs within, in the style of Issun-bōshi. As the castle-ninja disintegrates, Momo begins to disappear, but a squad of masked priests restore her size at a different shrine. Momo wakes up next to Vamola and sets out to find Seiko; she has forgotten everything, starting from before she first met Okarun; he meanwhile is diligently cleaning the shrine under Manjiro's coaching, convinced that Momo will soon return.
| 25 | September 4, 2026 | 978-4-08-885188-4 | — | — |
211. "Who the Heck?" (何者, Nanimono); 212. "Momo's Memories" (モモの記憶, Momo no Kioku); 213. "Okarun's Resolve" (オカルンの決意, Okarun no Ketsui); 214. "Feeling Kinda Fuzzy" (なんかモヤモヤするじゃんよ, Nanka Moyamoya Suru jan yo); 215. "A Feeling of Distance Between Them" (二人の距離感, Futari no Kyorikan); 216. "Look, We're Being Attacked by Space Aliens!" (宇宙人が襲ってくるじゃんよ, Uchūjin ga Osotte Kuru jan yo); 217. "The Ogre Club" (鬼の金棒, Oni no Kanabō); 218. "He's a Mummy, Isn't He?" (あいつミイラじゃね？, Aitsu Miira Jane?); 219. "The Mummy's Weakness" (ミイラの弱点, Miira no Jakuten)
At Tasty Geezer Breads, Count Saint-Germain meets with the frustrated alien and The Red Baron. The Red Baron and Saint-Germain work for the Black Paladins, a clandestine organization that use curses; the Serpo hired them secretly, but now Seiko and the Sorcerers Association know their patrons. Saint-Germain decides to make another attempt to befriend Okarun and create the ultimate yokai. Momo has forgotten both her friends and how to use her powers. Returning to school, her squabbles with Aira seem instinctive. Since Okarun is now a stranger to her, he vows to rekindle their relationship; as he works up the courage to speak with her, Momo confronts Okarun, saying she knows they were friends and she was relieved to see him. Feeling alienated, Momo is approached by Sanjome, who gives her a crime-prevention whistle. Miko and Muko set up Momo on a date with Okarun at the National Museum of Nature and Science; he confesses his love and Serpoians attack them in an empty space with their contracted help, Mr. Dris, a mummy riding a bicycle with a sword. His special attack switches anything black to empty space; eventually Momo blows the whistle, summoning the frustrated alien to subdue the Serpoians. When Okarun is stabbed, Momo and Okarun cleave Mr. Dris in twain. He regenerates, but Okarun and Momo unwind his bandages, revealing his true form, which resembles a blue whale, and he collapses under his weight. Okarun carries Momo home. Seiko wakes up in the hospital to find Turbo Granny has returned.
| 26 | November 4, 2026 | 978-4-08-885249-2 | — | — |
220. "Let's Treat Those Wounds" (傷の手当てをしましょう, Kizu no Ate o Shimashō); 221. "Ken's Conflict" (ケンの葛藤, Ken no Kattō); 222. "Who Are You People?" (お前らだれだ, Omaera Dare da); 223. "The Class Rep's Costume" (いんちょーの衣装, Inchō no Ishō); 224. "My Power's Been Stolen" (力を奪われました, Chikara o Ubawaremashita); 225. "The Ultimate Yokai" (最強の妖怪, Saikyō no Yōkai); 226. "Let's Create the Ultimate Yokai" (最強の妖怪を作ろう, Saikyō no Yōkai o Tsukurō); 227. "Saint-Germain's Intent" (サンジェルマンの思惑, Sanjeruman no Omowaku); 228. "The Old-Timers" (パイセンたち, Paisen-tachi)
At home, Momo tends Okarun's wounds and they eat a meal cooked by Vamola, who points out their obvious mutual attraction. Okarun asks Momo on a date after she loses two staring contests; outraged, she calls him a creep and he chides himself for moving too fast. Okarun, Aira, and Jiji meet Momo and Vamola on the way to school; the fresh rift between Okarun and Momo leads to an awkward squabble, which stops when Vamola suggests they all go on a group date. While shopping at Neon Town, Rin and Kouki are confronted by three Black Paladins: The Red Baron, Jack Wisp, and Vakappa. Red Baron uses his smoke powers to subdue Rin and instructs Kouki to admit defeat to save Rin. Jack Wisp takes her "Lord of the Flies" power using a kozuka knife and hands it to Red Baron, who similarly has Rin submit to save Kouki; Mai disappears along with the "Ombusman" power. Before they can finish off the girls, all three suddenly rush to the nearest restroom, summoned by a small girl, Miss Hanako, who easily defeats the trio and flushes Jack and Vakappa away, though Red Baron escapes. She helped at the request of Turbo Granny. Picking up his kozuka knives, Red Baron vows to kill Jiji. Returning to Ueno, Saint-Germain reports to Sir Vlad, who wants to assemble an "ultimate" yokai using the Fairy-Tale Card, energized with six powers extracted from the Family: Momo's Alice and Zuma's Hansel and Gretel, which were taken by Shinobi Basho while four others remain to be gathered. Basho installs Rin (The Little Mermaid) and Kouki's powers (Snow White) into Vlad. The Red Baron is surprised when Vlad forces him to yield his power (Little Red Riding Hood). Seiko thanks the masked Yatagarasu priests for their help; they realize that one of their members was a mole (Basho) and tell Seiko about the Black Paladins. The group date at the Super Amusement Park leaves Momo and Okarun fighting jealousy and heartache; a new antagonistic group, the Dragon Knights, vow to take Okarun's power (Pinocchio), which is the last one Vlad needs.

== Chapters not yet in tankōbon format ==
These chapters have yet to be published in a tankōbon volume.

229. "Honorable Date Time" (おデートの時間, O Dēto no Jikan)
230. "So Is It Love or Not—Which Is It?" (それはラブなのかラブじゃないのかどっちなんだい, Sore wa Rabu nano ka Rabu ja Nai no ka Dotchi Nandai)
231. "What's Going On Here?!" (なんてこったい, Nantekottai)
232. "The Heart of a Water Flea" (心はミジンコ, Kokoro wa Mijinko)
233. "This Old Man Has the Heart of a Water Flea" (おじさんの心はミジンコ, Ojisan no Kokoro wa Mijinko)
234. "Let's Cut This Hair" (髪を切ろう, Kami o Kirou)
235. "Barbershop Skills" (床屋の技術, Tokoya no Gijutsu)
236. "Run Away from Those Dinosaurs!" (恐竜から逃げろ, Kyōryū Kara Nigero)
237. "Spinosaurus" (スピノサウルス, Supinosaurusu)
238. "Okarun's Decision" (オカルンの決断, Okarun no Ketsudan)
239. "The Man They Call the Red Baron" (レッドバロンという男, Reddo Baron to Iu Otoko)
240. "Operation Rescue Jiji!" (ジジ救出作戦, Jiji Kyūshutsu Sakusen)
241. "The Glamour Boy's Courtship" (美男子の求愛, Bidanshi no Kyūai)
242. "A Big Ol' Dinosaur" (デカい恐竜, Deka i Kyōryū)
243. "Yo, the Big Track Meet's On" (大運動会が始まるんじゃんよ, Daiundōkai ga Hajimaru n Jan yo)
244. "Dragon Knights Track Meet" (ドラゲナイ大運動会, Doragenai Daiundōkai)
245. "The Man All Hopes Are On" (期待の男, Kitai no Otoko)
246. "The Oni Club and How To Use It" (鬼の金棒と使い道, Oni no Kanabō to Tsukaimichi)
247. "The Kaiju and The Kaiju" (怪獣と怪獣, Kaijū to Kaijū)
248. "How to Defeat a Kaiju" (怪獣の倒し方, Kaijū no Taoshikat)
249. "Soldiers of Love" (愛・戦士達, Ai Senshi-tachi)
250. "Four-Eyes Turned Into An Oni" (鬼になったメガネ, Oni ni Natta Megane)
251. "You Quit Being Human or Somethin?" (人間やめちまったのかよ, Ningen Yame Chimatta no Ka yo)
252. "Ken Takakura" (高倉健, Takakura Ken)
253. "The Heart" (心, Kokoro)
