= Sang Thong =

Southeast Asian folktale

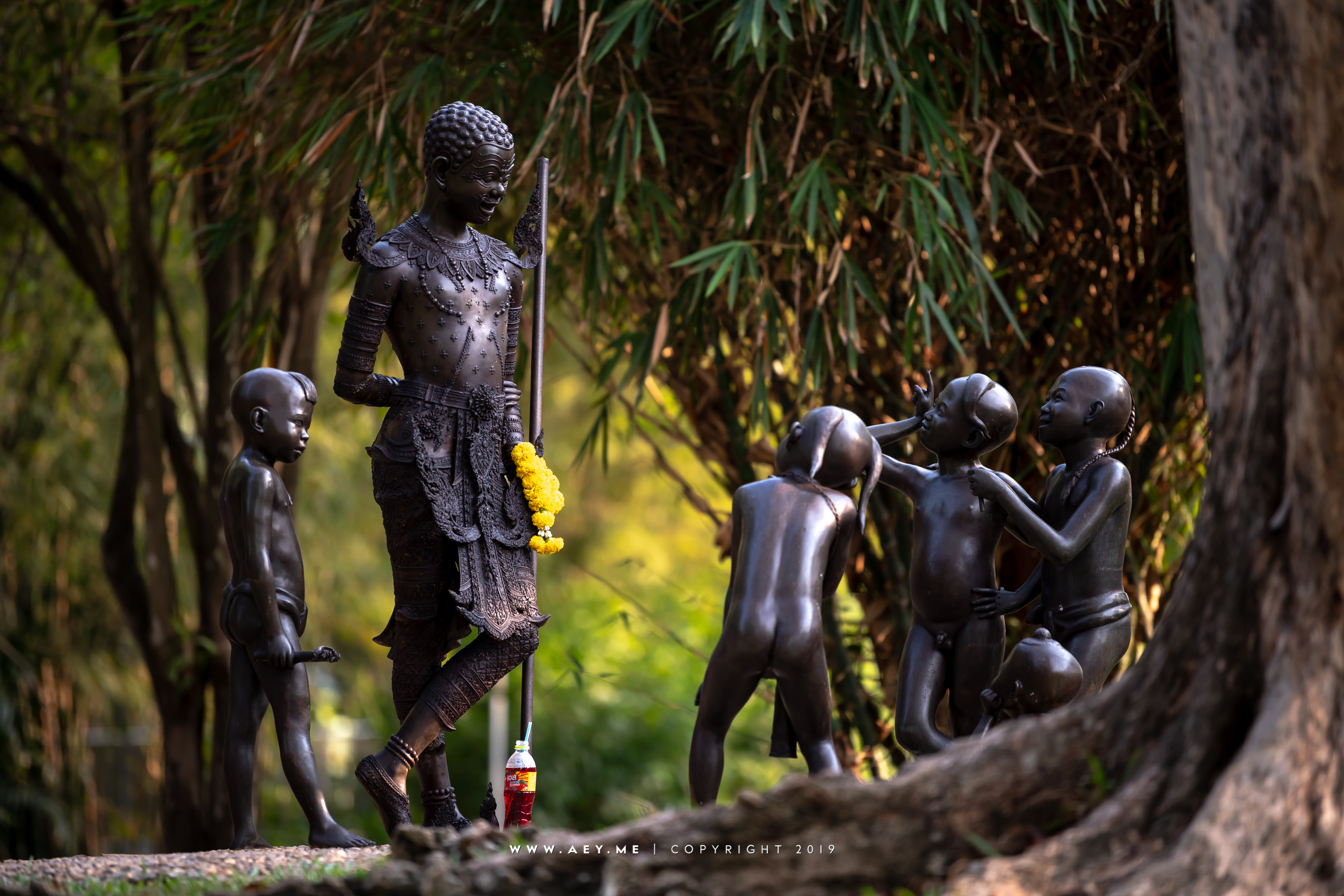
Sculpture depicting the Prince disguised as Chao Ngo, at King Rama II Memorial Park

Sang Thong (Thai: สังข์ทอง, 'golden conch'), The Prince of the Golden Conch Shell or Phra Sang Thong is a Southeast Asian folktale inspired from the Paññāsa Jātaka, a non-canonical collection of stories of the Buddha's past lives. In its Thai version, it tells the story of a prince who acquires a golden countenance, dons a disguise, marries a princess and saves the kingdom of his father-in-law.

== Summary ==
King Yotsawimon has two wives, the first named Chantathevi, the second Suwanchampa. She gives birth to a snail shell. His second wife conspires to banish her rival and her son from the palace.

Mother and son are expelled from the kingdom and take refuge with an old couple. His mother breaks his snail shell. He departs and is taken in by a giantess. One day, he jumps into a golden well and his body acquires a gilded appearance. He takes the treasures of giantess: a mask, a pair of flying shoes and a double-edged knife. He disguises himself with "an ugly mask" and calls himself Chao Ngo. (in other accounts, the mask is said to be of the Ngor people or a Negrito, and he is described as having black skin).

(In another Thai version, the prince escapes with the treasures from his adoptive mother, named Panturat, who dies of a broken heart).

His next stop is the Samon Kingdom, ruled by Thao Samon, where he arrives during a suitor selection test by the seventh daughter of King Samon, named Rodjana (Nang Rochana). During the selection, she is to throw a garland of flowers to her suitor. Chao Ngo is there amidst the crowd. Nang Rochana can see him through the disguise, but everyone else sees him as an ugly person. She throws the garland of flowers to him, marking her choice of husband. The king banishes his daughter after their marriage to a house in the rice fields.

In order to test his seven sons-in-law's mettle, he asks them to hunt a stag in the forest. The brothers-in-law ride to the forest, while Sang Thong takes off his disguise, shows his golden skin and attracts every stag to himself. Sang Thong's brothers-in-law see that the mysterious golden-skinned man has the wild animals all around him, and ask him to share some with them. Sang Thong agrees to let his brothers-in-law have some of the animals, in exchange for them cutting off a piece of their earlobes. Next, the king orders them to bring him a hundred fishes. The brothers-in-law go to catch the fishes for their king. Sang Thong, in his golden appearance, has summoned all the fishes from the river, and his brothers-in-law meet him and ask for some of his catch. Just like before, Sang Thong agrees to let them have the fishes, as long as they cut off a part of their noses.

At the end, Indra challenges the Samon Kingdom. Prince Sangthong takes off his disguise, assumes his true form and defeats Indra at a game. The king of Samon acknowledges him as his son-in-law and gives him the kingdom.

In an epilogue to the story, his real mother goes to the Samon Kingdom, now ruled by Sang Thong, and works as a cook. She inscribes their joint history in a gourd and the king recognizes his mother.

== Development ==
The earliest written version of the folktale appears as the Suvarna-Sangkha Jataka story in the Paññāsa Jātaka, a non-canonical collection of stories of the Buddha's past lives (jataka tales) written in Pali and compiled around the 15th–16th centuries in Chiang Mai, now in northern Thailand. Prior to then, the story was probably part of the oral tradition in the areas of present-day Thailand and its neighbouring countries. The tale was adapted into the lakhon nok play format, and extant fragments dating to the late Ayutthaya period (late 17th century – 1767) are known. The best known written version is that of the lakhon nok attributed to King Rama II.

The tale continues to enjoy popularity in Thailand, being one of the best known folktales and a prime example of the chak chak wong wong genre of stories. It appears in a wide range of media forms, is depicted in murals of Wat Phra Singh in Chiang Mai, and has been adapted for various modern literature and popular media.

== Spread ==
Variants of the tale are found across Thailand's neighbouring countries in Southeast Asia. According to James R. Brandon, Fern Ingersoll finds many literary treatments of the tale of Sang Thong across this region.

J. Leyden and Captain James Low mentioned the existence of an Indo-Chinese (Siamese) tale titled "Hǒi-sang" ("The Prince in a Conch Shell"), wherein the protagonist is a prince born in a chank-shell, abandoned in the forest and rescued by the Nāgas, given a golden ship by the Thewaldas and Devas, and goes on adventures. According to Leyden, the story figured among "most popular [Cheritras] among the T'hay", containing "the same stories and incidents" current among the Rukhéng, Barma and Malayu peoples.

=== Burma ===
In another version of tale, titled The Snail Prince and sourced from Burma, the queen gives birth to a snail, to her husband's horror. He orders the queen to be demoted to a lowly station and to throw the snail in the river. The snail is saved by an ogress (or ogress queen) and becomes a human boy. When he becomes a youth, the ogress gives him a cloak that turns him into a hunchback, to disguise his appearance; a magic cane and sends him to a human kingdom. He works as a cowherd in the city. When the youngest daughter of this city's king wants to marry, she throws a garland of flowers that falls on the now human snail prince. They marry. His father-in-law sets a task for his sons-in-law, and the hunchbacked youth accomplishes it. He reveals his true appearance as a golden prince and succeeds his father-in-law.

=== Cambodia ===
Researcher Judith M. Jacobs locates a similar story in Cambodian literature, dated to the year 1729. In this tale, titled Khyaṅ Săṅkh ("Shell Shell"), a king has two wives, Chandadevi and Chanda. Indra, in Heaven, convinces a Bodhisatva to reincarnate as Chandadevi's son. Queen Chanda casts a spell on their co-husband and convinces him to banish her rival. Chandadevi, pregnant, is banished from the kingdom and takes shelter with an old lady. In time, the fallen queen gives birth to a boy named Khyaṅ Săṅkh, born with a shell. Khyaṅ Săṅkh leaves his shell to sweep the house, then returns to it. Some time later, the envious co-queen Chanda learns of their new hideout, and soldiers are sent to kill him. Failing a first attempt, they try to drown Khyaṅ Săṅkh, but he survives. Khyaṅ Săṅkh then goes to live with a yaksini named Bandharas. Khyaṅ Săṅkh discovers human bones in her adoptive mother's house, then dips his finger in a pool of silver and in another pool of gold, against her wishes. He also finds a ṅoḥ disguise (cloak, cane and sandals) that allows him to fly. Bandharas meets him and teaches him a spell to draw animals to him, then dies. Khyaṅ Săṅkh goes to the kingdom of Sāmal, where the king has prepared a suitor selection test for his seven daughters. The elder princesses choose their husbands, save for the youngest princess, Racanā. The king orders for every male of noble and low birth to be brought to the assemblage, even the stranger Khyaṅ Săṅkh, whom princess Racanā chooses for she can see who he truly is. Enraged, the king expels the princess and her lowly husband to a hut outside the city. After a while, the king tries to kill Khyaṅ Săṅkh, and invites his seven sons-in-law for a hunt, whoever returned late would be killed. Khyaṅ Săṅkh uses his powers to summon the animals to him; his brothers-in-law wish to have some for themselves, and Khyaṅ Săṅkh agrees to a deal: some animals in exchange for part of their nostrils. Next, the king orders them to go fishing: Khyaṅ Săṅkh uses his powers to summon the fishes to himself; the six brothers-in-law wish to have some for themselves, and Khyaṅ Săṅkh gives some in exchange for their cut off ears. Lastly, the king summons everyone for a ball game (a ghli) in an arena. God Indra joins the game, and surrounds the city with an army. Khyaṅ Săṅkh, who can fly, defeats Indra in the game and saves the city, then reveals he was the one who ordered the brothers-in-law to cut off their body parts. At the end of the tale, Khyaṅ Săṅkh reunites with his mother Chandadevi.

Author Alan Houghton Brodrick summarized a version of the tale from Cambodia, with the title The Story of Prince Ngos: Prince Preas Sang is raised by a foster father, but decides to look for his parents. He arrives at the Samalreach kingdom, where the seven princesses are preparing to choose husbands by throwing garlands at their husbands of choice. The six elder princesses have already chosen their suitors, save for the youngest, princess Neang Pou Reachena. Prince Preas Sang learns of the willful princess, takes a bath in the Golden Well and the Silvern Well, dons a disguise as an ugly Wild Man of the Woods, then goes to the gathering. The Princess throws her garland to the newcomer, named Ngos, and marries him. The king tries to expel him from the palace, but Ngos is too heavy to be lifted, so the monarch banishes the couple to a hut in the forest. Later, the king decides to test his seven sons-in-law, and orders them to catch many fishes, and to hunt a special deer. With the magic abilities he learned from his ogress/yakshina foster mother, he succeeds and beats his brothers-in-law in the king's challenges.

=== Laos ===
In a Laotian tale translated into Russian with the title "Золотая улитка" (Zolotaya ulitka; "Golden Snail"), a king has no sons, until his wife Chanthewi gives birth to a snail. One of the king's courtiers, a devious man, interprets the birth as a bad omen and recommends the queen is banished. She is banished with the golden snail shell and takes shelter with a poor old couple. One day, the queen leaves home with the old couple, and, when they return, the food is made and the house is tidy. Chanthewi decides to discover the mysterious housekeeper: she pretends to leave and hides behind the house; a youth comes out of the snail shell to clean the house. Chanthewi cracks the snail shell; the youth recognizes her as his mother and is named Sang Thoong. Back at the palace, the devious courtier learns of the youth and lies to the king that he is an evil spirit. The king orders his execution and, after the executioner's axe is useless against Sang Thoong, ties a rock to his feet and throws him into the river. However, Sang Thoong is saved by a beautiful, but evil sorceress named Phanthurak, who welcomes him as son. One day, Phanthurak has to go on a journey, and tells Sang Thoong not to sneak into her belongings. After she leaves, the youth opens a door and sees human skulls and bones; he opens a chest and finds a jug with golden water; another with silver water, a spear and shoes. He dips his finger into the just with the golden liquid and it turns gold; he wears the shoes and discovers they can fly. The next day Phanthurak leaves, Sang Thoong drops the golden liquid on himself, steals the spear and shoes and flies away beyond the mountains. When Phanthurak returns, she discovers her things were stolen by the boy and tries to follow him, but stops at the foot of the mountain, since she has no magic equipment to climb it. Feeling that she is dying, Phanthurak inscribes into a stone a spell to learn the language of the birds as her last words. Sang Thoong descends the mountain and reads the inscriptions. With a newfound mastery of magic, he disguises himself as a mad man named Chau Ngo and goes to another kingdom. In this kingdom, the king's six elder daughters are already married, save for the seventh, Rochana. One day, the king summons all men to the courtyard for Rochana to choose her suitor, among them Chau Ngo. Princess Rochana goes to Chau Ngo and, instead of a mad man in shabby appearance, sees a golden youth. She puts a garland of flowers around his neck and announces her decision. Believing that his daughter made a poor choice, the king banishes his daughter to a humble hut, but Rochana cannot be happier. One day, Sang Thoong is taken by his brothers-in-law to take part in a hunt. The six brothers-in-law cannot find any good game, but see Sang Thoong surround by animals of the forest and ask if he can share some with them. Sang Thoong agrees to share, if they cut a part of their nostrils in return. The next time, they take Sang Thoong on a fishing trip. The same bad luck assails them, until Sang Thoong agrees to share some of his catches in return for them cutting their earlobes. The third time, war erupts near the kingdom, and princess Rochana tells that her father is summoning Sang Thoong to join in the fray to protect her kingdom. Sang Thoong rides a horse and uses the stolen spear from Phanthurak to defeat the enemy army. Rochana's father thinks that the warrior came from the Heavens, but his daughter Rochana explains it is her husband. At the end of the tale, Sang Thoong finds his mother Chanthewi and reconciles with his father.

=== Malaysia ===
The tale of the Golden Prince in the Conch Shell is performed in Malaysia as a type of mak yong, by the name of Anak Raja Gondang ("The Prince of the Golden Conch Shell" or "The Conch Shell Prince".

Mubin Sheppard provided the summary of a second version of the tale, which was performed in Kelantan. In this version, Sang Thong is the actual son of an ogress, born with black skin and a tiny black wand with magical powers he carries in his hand. The ogress dies and he goes to live in the forest. When six young princesses come to bathe in the lake, he falls in love with the youngest, and the spirit of his mother appears in his dreams to help him win the princess as his wife. She returns to life in the shape of a tiger to menace the kingdom. Sang Thong uses his magical wand to kill the tiger and resurrect the people the animal killed. He marries the princess and lives as a black-skinned man by day, and as a man with a glistening skin like gold at night.

Mubin Sheppard also provided a summary of a mak yong translated as The Triton Shell Prince: a raja is married to a queen, daughter of the King of the Sea Dragons, and she gives birth to a triton shell. For this, she is banished with the shell and takes shelter with a hermit. While the queen is away, a boy emerges of the triton shell and grows in the next days as a youth. After a situation with his birth father's cock-trapper, the Raja imprisons him and tries to kill him, but a sword cannot harm his skin, nor an elephant can trample the boy. The boy is thrown in the sea, in the domains of his maternal grandfather, who rescues him and puts him in contact with the Ogre king named Raja Gurgasi. The shell youth discovers skeletons of Raja Gergasi's previous victims, and tricks the Ogre into teaching him an invisibility spell, then destroys the Ogre's external soul. The youth also finds an ape-skin he can put it on, and journeys to another kingdom. In this kingdom, its seven princesses are collecting flowers for their upcoming betrothals, and the shell youth, seen by the seventh and youngest princess, convinces her to marry him. The king banishes her, but is threatened by a man in ape-skin, and consents to their marriage. Later, the king sets tests for his seven sons-in-law, the ape-skin man included, hoping that the latter fails, but he is the one to prevail in every attempt. At last, the king concedes defeat and makes the Shell Prince his successor.

=== Palaung people ===
In a Burmese tale from the Palaung people, "Принц-улитка" ("Prince-Snail"), a king has seven queens. One night, the first queen has a strange dream she interprets as a sign she will soon become pregnant. Nine months later, she gives birth to a snail shell. The king casts the shell into the water, and the river washes it away to distant margins. A childless old couple finds the shell and takes it home. A youth comes out of the shell, does the chores and returns to it, after the couple goes to work. The old man discovers the youth and adopts him. One day, the snail youth finds human remains under the couple's house, and escapes by using a pair of magical shoes the couple owned. He flies to a distant kingdom. He dons a disguise as a poor man and goes to a celebration, where the princess is standing on a built platform from where she will throw flower garlands at her prospective husband. A garland falls on Prince-Snail's neck and he marries the princess, but, seeing the youth's sorry state, the people feel sorry for her. The princess and her husband move out to a hut in the outskirts of town, where they work hard. One day, the snail prince takes off the poor man's disguise and shows his true self at the princess's house, who does not recognize him. He tests her by saying that, if she is a princess, she must be paired off with a youth such as him. However, the princess rebuffs him by saying she is already married. Content at the fact that the princess is loyal and faithful, the snail prince reveals himself to her, and they live together. At the end of the tale, the king learns of his son-in-law's true form and nominates him as his heir.

In another Palaung tale, collected by anthropologist Mrs. Leslie Milne with the title The White Water-Snail (Palaung: Hō-i k'āū), the queen gives birth to a water snail and is cast adrift down a river on a boat. She first docks in the kingdom of the Naga, where they are saved by the dragon queen, but her husband, the dragon king, expels them again. The human queen washes down to the land of demons, where a demoness takes and rears the young water snail, who turns into a human youth after seven months. The (now human) snail boy discovers the bones of his adoptive mother's victims, fetches some clothes form her storeroom, steals some elements of nature from her garden (water, fire and wind) and flies away to the kingdom of Chambanagō. In this kingdom, the ruler has an only daughter, a beautiful princess, who many princes have come to court. The king decides to build a high tower and place his daughter there, then assemble a crowd of suitors for her to throw a hood (a turban, in another translation) to her suitor of choice, instead of a garland. The human snail boy goes joins the assemblage, but, due to his smell, he drives people away. The princess says a prayer and throws the hood, which falls on the snail boy. The king is furious at her choice, but the princess considers it her karma, and is banished to the outskirts of town with her lowly husband. In poverty, the snail boy builds a hut of palm leaves as their home, and guides the princess to a hidden valley of gems and gold. They summon a "master of the carts" to take out the gold and precious gems to the city, where they hire servants to build them a palace. After their new home is erected, the snail boy asks his wife to go ahead and invite her parents to their home, while he stays there out of shame. After the princess leaves, the snail boy transforms himself into a handsome person in splendid clothes, like a "lord of spirits", whom the princess does not recognize when she returns with the king and queen. The lord of the spirits shows the princess the ogress jacket he stole from his adoptive mother and proves he was the lowly snail boy. The princess's fears are assuaged and her parents bless their marriage.

=== Shan people ===
In a tale from the Shan people translated as The Silver Oyster, a king has many wives, but no child, and asks them to pray to the Nats for one. The Queen goes to the garden to pray, and one day has a dream about the Sun descending on her breast, which she interprets as a sign she will become pregnant. Later, the Queen gives birth to a Silver Oyster. Ashamed, the king banishes the queen and throws the oyster in the river. The queen takes shelter with a poor couple, while Thakya Min comes down from the Heavens, places a pair of flying shoes and a stick, and writes a letter informing that after seven months something will come out of the oyster. The oyster is placed in a pot which washes to the kingdom of dragons, whose eldest princess fetches, but her father returns the pot to the water. The pot is then found by a giantess from the kingdom of giants, and out comes a boy. The giantess and her maids, metamorphosed as humans, raise the boy, but keep him from climbing to the rooftop of her house. One day, when the boy is sixteen years old, finds a giant's garments, a mask and the pot that held the oyster with the shoes and the stick. The boy takes the magic objects then flies to a blood pond, where he releases some prisoners. His giantess mother finds him and tries to persuade him to come back, but he flies off to another country. There, he, disguised with the giant's garments that make him look ugly, lives with cowherds. The next year, the boy goes to a pwe, where the country's king's seven daughters will choose their husbands from the assembled people. When it is the youngest princess's turn, who is on a platform, she sees him as a beautiful youth, then gives him the wreath, marking her choice. The king learns of this and banishes the couple to live in the forest, while the elder princesses plot to kill their brother-in-law. Later, the king sends his seven daughters to bring fishes for him, and whoever arrives last shall have their husband executed. The seventh princess cries over this, but her husband beats the magic stick on the ground and produces the fishes for her, then goes to the forest to play a trick on his sisters-in-law: he takes off the ugly garments and creates a throne to sit on, summons every fish to his location, and waits for the elder princesses. The girls find no fish in the forest, but meet the boy, whom they do not recognize and think him a divine nat. The unknown promises them fishes, in exchange for the girls cutting off the tips of their noses. The next day, they try a similar tactic: this time, they have to bring a stag to the king. The boy tricks the princesses again and asks for the tip of their ears as payment for some stags. The last time, the princesses must each build a road of jewels from their houses to the palace in seven days. On the sixth day, the youngest princess's husband prays and the task is fulfilled. He then takes his wife and both walk the splendid road to the king's palace, accompanied by divine nats, and there he tells how he was the one to fulfill the hunting tasks. The king reprimands his daughters, and their brother-in-law forgives them, restoring their noses and ears. At the end of the tale, the boy returns to his home country, brings the dragon-princess and the giantess foster mother to live with them.

In a Shan tale translated as The Story of Ai Maung of the Tousled Hair (White Shell-fish, the future Buddha), a king and his chief queen are childless, thus, advised by counsellors, they go to a banyan tree to pray to its guardian and to Indra to be blessed with one. In time, the queen becomes pregnant, and the king requests his councellors to cut a golden rope for a son and a silver rope for a girl. However, the queen gives birth to a white shellfish, to the councellors' consternation. The king is told of the strange birth and banishes the queen from the palace. The queen takes shelter in the Village of the Seers, where she receives a prediction that in seventeen years' time she will be redeemed. As for the white shellfish, the king places it on a raft and sets it adrift downstream. The King of the Gods descends to Earth and leaves a letter on the raft for someone to find and take care of the shellfish. The raft washes ashore in the land of the Nagas, and is rescued by its king and queen. The Naga king and queen turn the shellfish to human form and raise the prince, but dislike having to assume human form and place his shellfsih form back on the raft, leaving him with an advice to summon them if he needs their help. Next, the shellfish prince's raft arrives at the realm of the Spirits of the Netherworld or Ghouls. Their queen knows the shellish is a future incarnation of the Buddha and adopts him, turning it to human form. The Ghoul queen takes care of the prince, but has to leave the place one day. While she is away, White Shellfish goes to take a stroll in the garden and finds human victims tied to ropes, who warn him he is in the land of ogres who will devour him. The prince investigates the garden below and finds heaps of bones. He quickly returns to the Golden Palace, gets everyone drunk, steals a weapon cane, a dagger, the queen's disguise and a pair of flying shoes he uses to travel to the land of humans. After she returns, the ghoul queen learns the youth has fled and tries to follow after him, but cannot reach him, so she shouts at him to call on her if she needs her help. White Shellfish lands in the country of humans, where, due to his shabby appearance (runny nose and tousled hair), he is called Ai Maung by 500 herdsmen who are playing pitch with seabean seeds. He befriends them and goes to herd the 500 cattle of the king. Later, the local king arranges for a grand festival where his still unmarried seventh daughter will choose her suitor in the Casting of the Garland Festival. White Shellfish, in the disguise of Ai Maung, attends the gathering and watches as the princess prays before throwing the garland. The garland does seven spins in the air and lands on Ai Maung, to the princess's brothers-in-law's and the king's disgust. The cadette princess is banished from the palace to live with the poor youth Ai Maung near the cemetery, but she could not be happier. Later, the princess's six brothers-in-law suspect that Ai Maung is not what he appears, surmise his powers mark him as a next king or the next Buddha, and concoct a scheme to get rid of Ai Maung: first, they convince the king to send his sons-in-law for the Gold Fish, and if Ai Maung cannot find it, he is to be executed. Ai Maung and the other princes venture to the forest to hunt the Gold Fish, and Ai Maung removes his disguise, uses the weapon cane and summons the fishes of the rivers towards him. His brothers-in-law meet him, who they not recognize and mistake him for a Guardian of the Seas. Ai Maung agrres to let them have the Gold Fish, in exchange for their earlobes. Next, the princes convince the king to request the Golden Deer. Ai Maung goes to the mountains, preteds to be the Guardian Spirit of the Mountain and summons every deer to him. The princes find him again and ask for the Golden Deer, agreeing to cut off the bridges of their noses. Thirdly, the king requests that the princes provide Golden Palaces in seven days. Ai Maung removes his lowly disguise to reveal himself to his wife, calls upon the attributes of his parents, the Buddha's, the Naga rulers' and the Queen of the Ghouls's to create a golden palace. The princess's father goes to the Golden Place and meets White Shellfish, now in his true form, whom he named Crown Prince. The six princes ask for White Shellfish's forgiveness, and he restores their ears and noses. At the end of the tale, White Shellfish returns to his home kingdom and discovers his father has gambled away the king's gold and silver in cock fights. White Shellfish pretends to be a contestant and bets against his father the kingdom itself. White Shellfish wins and organizes a festival to celebrate his victory. During the event, he places the white shellfish o a platter, and his mother, the queen, goes to hold it. White Shellfish, knowing the woman is his mother, goes to embrace. The king, who once expelled his wife and son, reunites with them and is given back his kingdom. The tale was provided by Shan author Maung Saw Pe and sourced from Lai-Hka.

== See also ==
- Thai folklore
- Thai literature
- The Snail Son (Japanese folktale)
- The Turtle Prince (folktale)
- The Magician's Horse
- The Black Colt
- The Story of the Prince and His Horse
- Iron John
- Keong Emas (Golden Snail, Javanese folktale)
- Ureongi gaksi (The Snail Bride, Korean folktale)
- Svayamvara (Indian marriage ritual)
