= Keong Emas =

Javanese folktale

Folk tale
- Name: Keong Emas
- Mythology: Javanese
- Country: Indonesia
- Region: Java

Keong Emas (Javanese and Indonesian for Golden Snail) is a popular Javanese folklore about a princess magically transformed and contained in a golden snail shell. The folklore is a part of the popular Javanese Panji cycle, which tells stories about the prince Panji Asmoro Bangun (also known as Raden Inu Kertapati) and his consort, Princess Dewi Sekartaji (also known as Dewi Chandra Kirana).

== The story ==
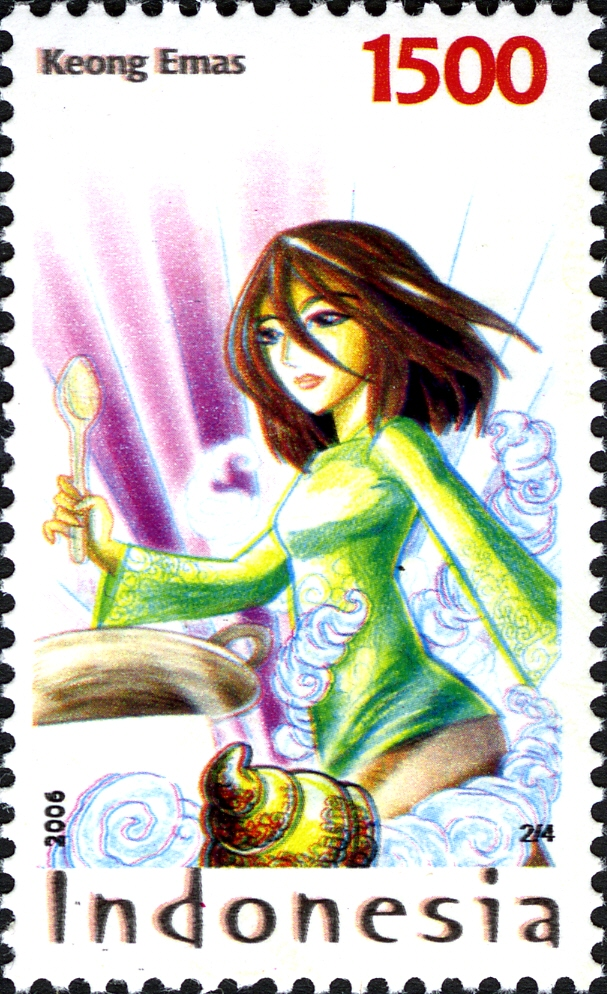
Keong Emas on 2006 Indonesia stamp

There are several versions of Keong Emas known in Indonesia. In the most common telling, the narrative begins with the King of Antah Berantah—meaning somewhere unknown, a term used to describe a place in a fictional setting—desiring to take princess Dewi Sekartaji as his wife, although she is already married to prince Panji Asmoro Bangun. The king kidnaps her, but she is saved by the god Batara Narada, who transforms her into a golden snail. Batara Narada tells Keong Emas (i.e. golden snail) to drift down a river in order to be reunited with her husband.

The story then describes how Mbok Rondo, a poor old widow who fishes in the river, finds the golden snail and takes it home as a pet, placing it in a jar and caring for it. From this time on, good things unexpectedly begin to happen to her. When she returns from her daily fishing the next day, she finds that her house has been cleaned and her table set with delicious dishes. She wonders who could be responsible, and after the same thing occurs for several days, she leaves the house but does not go fishing: she instead hides and watches through a hole in the wall. Eventually she sees a beautiful princess come out of the jar and go about cleaning her home and preparing her meals.

The next day, Mbok Rondo hides and watches in the same way, and sees the same thing occur. She then rushes into the house and smashes the jar, together with the empty snail shell inside, with a stone mortar. Unable to return to the shell, Dewi Sekartaji is released from the god's spell, and Mbok Rondo adopts her as her daughter. Meanwhile, prince Panji is wandering between villages in search of his wife. When he reaches Dadapan village, he finds the princess in the widow's home, and the two rejoice. They return to their kingdom together, bringing Mbok Rondo with them.

== Other versions ==
There are several versions of the story concerning the cause of the princess being magically turned into a golden snail. One version says that Dewi Sekartaji was transformed by Batara Narada to help her escape from captivity; another version explains that a magic curse was cast upon her by her jealous sister, the wicked Dewi Galuh Ajeng, a witch who also wished to marry prince Panji. In another version, the princess accidentally stepped on a snail and broke its shell; the snail was an evil witch in disguise, who then put a curse upon the princess. The other parts of the story, where the princess was saved by an old widow and she periodically transformed back to her human form to repay the kindness of the old widow and finally reunited with her husband, remain the same.

== Popular culture ==
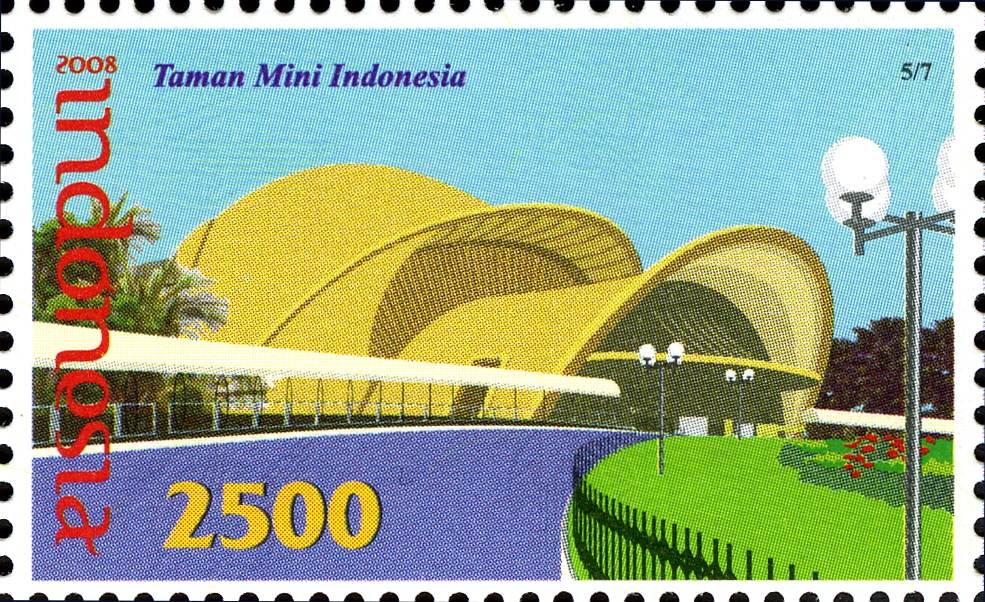
Keong Emas (Golden Snail) Theater on a 2008 Indonesia stamp.

Keong Emas is a popular Indonesian fairytale, told for generations, and is often featured in many children's storybooks. The moral taught to children is to be kind and grateful, willing to repay the kindness they have received from others. The tale of Keong Emas inspired the architectural design of Keong Emas IMAX Theatre in Taman Mini Indonesia Indah, Jakarta.

== See also ==
- Sang Thong (Golden Conch, Thai folktale)
- Ureongi gaksi (The Snail Bride, Korean folktale)
