= Ureongi gaksi =

Korean folktale

Ureongi gaksi (Korean: 우렁이 각시, lit. 'The Snail Bride') is a Korean folktale about a poor man who breaks taboo and marries a maiden who comes out of a snail shell. Among variations of the story, their central theme features an inter-species marriage between a snail who transforms into a woman and a human male. The tale also depicts the motif of a government official from the ruling class taking away a woman in a relationship with a lower-class male civilian.

The folktale is also known in China under names of 螺女; (lit. 'snail woman'), 海螺姑娘; (lit. 'conch maiden'), and 田螺姑娘; (lit. 'river snail maiden').

== History and transmission ==
Japanese researcher Fumihiko Kobayashi stated that the tale of the Pond-Snail Wife "circulate in Korea and China".

=== Chinese tradition ===
The tale of a snail turning into a woman, called "螺女" ("snail woman"), has been orally passed down not only in Korea but in China as well, where it appears as a popular tale. In the story, a young man brings home a river snail from the water's edge, where it transforms into a beautiful young woman; she takes care of the household and lives with the man as his wife.

In Chinese tradition, the tale has a long literary history, with thirty tales extant since ancient times, reaching a "mature form" by the time of the Wei and Jin Dynasties. An example includes Dengyuanzuo (鄧元佐) in a collection of novellas titled Jiyiji (集異記 Collection of Strange Stories). There is also Luonuxing (螺女形) in a story collection titled Soushen houji (搜神後記 Sequel to Records of the Strange) compiled by the poet Tao Qian (陶潛, 365-474 BC).

Chinese folklorist and scholar Ting Nai-tung stated that the snail woman or fairy fulfills the role of "the mysterious housekeeper" par excellence in Chinese stories. Tales of this sort are attested in ancient Chinese literature, by the time of the ancient Jin dynasty. In his own typological classification of Chinese folktales, he also established its own subtype for the story: type 400C, "The Snail Wife".

On the other hand, researcher Haiwang Yuan argues that the story originated in 677 AD in China. In this original version, the snail-wife was actually a heavenly envoy who came to help, not marry, the human farmer.

According to Chinese folktale researcher Li Shouhua, the story is rooted in China's agrarian culture.

=== Korean tradition ===
Korean scholarship may also name this tale The Pond-Snail Wife and classify it as type KT 206 in the Korean type index. Variants are reported to "widely circulate" in Korea.

As for Korean versions of the tale, there is Jogae sokeseo naon yeoja (조개 속에서 나온 여자The Woman Who Came Out of a Shell) in Ondol yahwa (온돌야화 Late Night Tales Told on Ondol Floors), which is a Japanese-language collection of Korean folktales by Jeong In-seop that was published in Tokyo in 1927. There is also Najung mibu seolhwa (나중미부설화 The Myth of the Fair Bride From a Shell) in Haguk seolhwa munhak eui yeongu (한국설화문학의 연구 A Study on Korean Narrative Literature) by Son Jin-tae that was published in 1946. The folktale has been orally transmitted widely in all regions throughout the Korean peninsula so that more than thirty different variations of Ureongi gaksi are included in major folktale collections such as Hanguk gubi munhak daegye (한국구비문학대계 Compendium of Korean Oral Literature). Almost all Koreans are familiar with the term "Ureongi gaksi" because it is an analogy referring to a person who secretly cooks a meal for someone.

== Plot ==
=== Summary ===
Once upon a time, there was a man living with his mother for he was too poor to find a wife. One day, while working in a rice paddy, the man grumbled to himself, "Who will I eat this rice with?" Then he heard a voice reply, "With me." Startled, he once more asked, "Who will I eat this rice with?" and the voice again answered, "With me." The man looked around to find nothing but a snail shell at the edge of the rice paddy, so he brought it home and kept it in a water jar. From that day on, when mother and son came back home from work each day, a delicious meal would be prepared for them. Curious to find out who was cooking, the man pretended to leave for work one day and crept back to keep an eye on the house. He then saw a beautiful maiden emerge from the snail shell to prepare a meal. The man jumped out, ran over to the maiden, and asked her to live with him instead of going back into the snail shell. The maiden told him it was not yet time, but the impatient man kept begging her to stay so that the two became husband and wife on that very day.

Fearing that his wife might be taken away from him, the husband never let her leave the house. Whenever she prepared lunch for her husband, her mother-in-law would deliver it to her son working in the field. One day, the mother-in-law wished to stay home to enjoy some crispy leftover rice, so she asked her daughter-in-law to deliver lunch to her son. On her way to her husband, however, the snail bride ran into the magistrate's procession. She quickly hid in the woods, but the magistrate spotted the radiance from her body among the trees. Smitten by her beauty, the magistrate took her away in a palanquin to make her his bride. The husband ultimately failed to find his wife although he went to the magistrate's office looking for her, which caused him to die of despair and become reborn as a blue bird. The kidnapped snail bride refused to eat and disobeyed the magistrate until she too died and turned into a fine-toothed comb.

=== Variation ===
Most variations of this folktale lead to an unhappy ending like the plot introduced above, either by the couple committing suicide or other means of death. In one variation, instead of the mother-in-law, the portrait the snail bride draws for her husband causes her to come across the magistrate. In that variation, the husband is so enamored with his wife that he refuses to leave home for work. The snail bride thus draws a portrait of herself and gives it to her husband to take to work. The portrait, however, is blown away in the wind while the husband is working and allows the magistrate to discover the snail bride and come after her. Meanwhile, another variation bears no mention of a magistrate but arrives at an unhappy ending when the snail bride fails to become wholly human because she marries before the right time comes. In one rare variation that finishes with a happy ending, the magistrate hosts a banquet for beggars in an attempt to make the snail bride laugh. The husband appears at the banquet and dances in a costume covered with bird feathers. At this, the snail bride finally laughs so that the magistrate hands his official robe to the husband, suggesting that he would like to try on the bird feather costume. Once they change robes, the snail bride tells her husband to quickly step up to the porch. This causes the magistrate to be ousted while the husband is appointed as a government official and lives happily ever after with his wife.

== Features and significance ==
Ureongi gaksi features an inter-species marriage between a snail that turns into a maiden and a male human. When the man courts her, the snail bride tells him she cannot accept him for a couple of days. However, the man is impatient and breaks the taboo by immediately making her his bride. Ureongi gaksi is therefore structured around taboos and breaking them. The part where the magistrate becomes smitten with the snail bride's beauty and takes her away strongly hints at the motif of a government official taking possession of a woman related to a civilian. Having a maiden emerge from a snail shell gives the story a mysterious air. Yet, describing that it is the snail bride's duty to be good at cooking indicates that the term "Ureongi gaksi" represents women who are homemakers in their in-laws' household.

== Other ==
Ureongi gaksi features the motif of a government official taking away a woman related to a civilian. Tales with the same motif have gained attention for serving as sources for the well-known Korean classic called Chunhyangjeon (춘향전 The Tale of Chunhyang). Other Korean folktales similar to Ureongi gaksi include Domi eui cheo (도미의 처 The Wife of Domi) and Jirisan baksaeknyeo (지리산 박색녀 The Ugly Woman at Mount Jiri).

== Translations ==
The tale was translated as The Mud-Snail Fairy and The Snail Lady, both sourced from Korea.

Another Korean version of the tale, titled The Story of the Covetous Magistrate, was published by E. B. Landis in the Journal of American Folklore. In this version of the story, the fairy gets out of a pumpkin, but the rest of the tale remains largely the same.

== See also ==
- Keong Emas (Golden Snail, Javanese folktale)

== Sources ==
Korean tales

- "Ureongi gaksi", Encyclopedia of Korean Language and Literature.
- Kim Dae-sook, "Ureongi gaksi", Encyclopedia of Korean Folk Literature.
- Kim Dae-sook, "Snail Bride", Encyclopedia of Korean Folk Literature.
- Kim Hyeon-ryong, "Ureongi gaksi," Encyclopedia of Korean Folk Culture.
- Shin Dong-heun, "Ureong gaksi: The Mirthful Imagery in Folktales and the Sighs They Carry", Reading Korean Classics.
- Choi In-hak, "Ondol yahwa", Encyclopedia of Korean Folk Culture.

Chinese tales

- 刘 守 华 [Li Shouhua] (2002). "捡 来 田螺 做 妻子 一 一 " 螺 女 "故事 解析". In Liu Shouhua (ed.). 中 国民 间 故 事 类 型 研究 (in Chinese). Wuhan: 华中 师范 大 学 出 版 社 [Central China University Press]. pp. 362–374. ISBN 7-5622-2609-1.
