= List of Mashle chapters =

Cover of the first tankōbon volume, published by Shueisha on June 4, 2020

Mashle: Magic and Muscles is a Japanese manga series written and illustrated by Hajime Kōmoto. It was serialized in Shueisha's shōnen manga magazine Weekly Shōnen Jump from January 27, 2020, to July 3, 2023. Shueisha collected is chapters in 18 tankōbon volumes, released from June 4, 2020, to October 4, 2023.

The manga is digitally serialized by Viz Media and Manga Plus in English. In October 2020, Viz Media announced the print and digital publication of the manga and the first volume was published on July 6, 2021.

== Volumes ==
No.	Original release date	Original ISBN	English release date	English ISBN
1	June 4, 2020	978-4-08-882329-4	July 20, 2021	978-1-9747-1929-7
1. "Mash Burnedead and the Body of the Gods" (マッシュ・バーンデッドと鍛え抜かれた筋肉, Masshu Bāndeddo to Kitae Nukareta Kin'niku); 2. "Mash Burnedead and The Mysterious Maze" (マッシュ・バーンデッドと不思議な迷路, Masshu Bāndeddo to Fushigina Meiro); 3. "Mash Burnedead and the Deadly Doll" (マッシュ・バーンデッドと死の人形, Masshu Bāndeddo to Shi no Ningyō); 4. "Mash Burnedead and the Clean Sweep" (マッシュ・バーンデッドと箒と対決, Masshu Bāndeddo to Hōki no Taiketsu); 5. "Mash Burnedead and the Baleful Bully" (マッシュ・バーンデッドと怒らせちゃいけない人, Masshu Bāndeddo to Okorase Chaikenai Hito); 6. "Mash Burnedead and the Academy Hierarchy" (マッシュ・バーンデッドと学校のルール, Masshu Bāndeddo to Gakkō no Rūru); 7. "Mash Burnedead and the Game of Brooms" (マッシュ・バーンデッドと箒の競技, Masshu Bāndeddo to Hōki no Kyōgi); 8. "Mash Burnedead and the Challenging Magic User" (マッシュ・バーンデッドと強めの魔法使い, Masshu Bāndeddo to Tsuyome no Mahōtsukai)
2	August 4, 2020	978-4-08-882377-5	September 7, 2021	978-1-9747-2351-5
9. "Mash Burnedead and the Big Brother" (マッシュ・バーンデッドとお兄にいちゃん, Masshu Bāndeddo to Onii-chan); 10. "Mash Burnedead and the Potions Problem" (マッシュ・バーンデッドと魔法薬学の課題, Masshu Bāndeddo to Mahōyakugaku no Kadai); 11. "Mash Burnedead and the Unpopular Classmate" (マッシュ・バーンデッドとモテない同級生, Masshu Bāndeddo to Motenai Dōkyūsei); 12. "Mash Burnedead and the Signs of Love" (マッシュ・バーンデッドと恋模様, Masshu Bāndeddo to Koi Moyō); 13. "Mash Burnedead and the Man Who Can't Doubt" (マッシュ・バーンデッドと疑えない男, Masshu Bāndeddo to Utagaenai Otoko); 14. "Mash Burnedead and the Magic of Iron" (マッシュ・バーンデッドと鉄の魔法, Masshu Bāndeddo to Tetsu no Mahō); 15. "Mash Burnedead and the Giant Forest Scorpion" (マッシュ・バーンデッドと巨大森サソリ, Masshu Bāndeddo to Kyodai Mori Sasori); 16. "Mash Burnedead and the Bone Unicorn" (マッシュ・バーンデッドとユニコーンの骨, Masshu Bāndeddo to Yunikōn no Hone); 17. "Mash Burnedead and the Puppet Master" (マッシュ・バーンデッドと人形の魔法使い, Masshu Bāndeddo to Ningyō no Mahō Tsukai)
3	October 2, 2020	978-4-08-882425-3	November 2, 2021	978-1-9747-2511-3
18. "Mash Burnedead and the Magic Scale" (マッシュ・バーンデッドと魔法の秤, Masshu Bāndeddo to Mahō no Hakari); 19. "Lance Crown and the Shuriken Thrower" (ランス・クラウンと手裏剣の魔法使い, Ransu Kuraun to Shuriken no Mahōtsukai); 20. "Mash Burnedead and the Masked Magic User" (マッシュ・バーンデッドと仮面の魔法使い, Masshu Bāndeddo to Kamen no Mahōtsukai); 21. "Mash Burnedead and the Cream Charm" (マッシュ・バーンデッドとシュークリームのお守り, Masshu Bāndeddo to Shūkurīmu no Omamori); 22. "Dot Barrett and the Rose with Thorns" (ドット・バレットといばらの魔法使い, Dotto Baretto to Ibara no Mahōtsukai); 23. "Mash Burnedead and the Wolves of Magic" (マッシュ・バーンデッドと狼の魔法使いたち, Masshu Bāndeddo to Ōkami no Mahōtsukai-tachi); 24. "Lance Crown and the Mage of Mud" (ランス・クラウンと泥の魔法使い, Ransu Kuraun to Doro no Mahōtsukai); 25. "Lance Crown and the Higher Tier of Magic" (ランス・クラウンと高等魔法, Ransu Kuraun to Kōtō Mahō); 26. "Mash Burnedead and the Accelerated Battle" (マッシュ・バーンデッドと加速の魔法使い, Masshu Bāndeddo to Kasoku no Mahōtsukai)
4	January 4, 2021	978-4-08-882526-7	January 4, 2022	978-1-9747-2537-3
27. "Mash Burnedead and the High-Tier Speed Magic" (マッシュ・バーンデッドと速度の高等魔法, Masshu Bāndeddo to Sokudo no Kōtō Mahō); 28. "Mash Burnedead and the Broken Mask" (マッシュ・バーンデッドと割れた仮面, Masshu Bāndeddo to Wareta Kamen); 29. "Dot Barrett and the Tempestuous Magic User" (ドット・バレットと竜巻の魔法使い, Dotto Baretto to Tatsumaki no Mahōtsukai); 30. "Dot Barrett and the Monstrously Powerful Mage" (ドット・バレットとすごく強い魔法使い, Dotto Baretto to Sugoku Tsuyoi Mahōtsukai); 31. "Mash Burnedead and the Divine Visionary" (マッシュ・バーンデッドと神覚者の男, Masshu Bāndeddo to Kami Satoru-sha no Otoko); 32. "Mash Burnedead and the Surprising Strike" (マッシュ・バーンデッドと強引な球転がし, Masshu Bāndeddo to Gōin'na Kyū Korogashi); 33. "Mash Burnedead and the Knee Strike" (マッシュ・バーンデッドと膝蹴り, Masshu Bāndeddo to Hizageri); 34. "Mash Burnedead and the Survival of the Fittest" (マッシュ・バーンデッドと弱肉強食, Masshu Bāndeddo to Jakunikukyōshoku); 35. "Mash Burnedead and the Victory Celebration" (マッシュ・バーンデッドと勝利の舞, Masshu Bāndeddo to Shōri no Mai)
5	March 4, 2021	978-4-08-882575-5	March 1, 2022	978-1-9747-2713-1
36. "Mash Burnedead and the Cream Puff Celebration" (マッシュバーンデッドとシュークリームパーティー, Masshu Bāndeddo to Shūkurīmu Pātī); 37. "Mash Burnedead and the Obsidian Rain" (マッシュ・バーンデッドと黒い雨, Masshu Bāndeddo to Kuroi Ame); 38. "Mash Burnedead and the Magic Mirror" (マッシュ・バーンデッドと魔法の鏡, Masshu Bāndeddo to Mahō no Kagami); 39. "Mash Burnedead and the Victory Celebration" (マッシュ・バーンデッドと祝勝パーティー, Masshu Bāndeddo to Shukushō Pātī); 40. "Mash Burnedead and the Candle's Flame" (マッシュ・バーンデッドと蝋燭の火, Masshu Bāndeddo to Rōsoku no Hi); 41. "Mash Burnedead and the Divine Visionaries" (マッシュ・バーンデッドと神覚者たち, Masshu Bāndeddo to Kami Satoru-sha-tachi); 42. "Mash Burnedead and the Desert Visionary" (マッシュ・バーンデッドと砂の神覚者, Masshu Bāndeddo to Suna no Kami Kakuja); 43. "Mash Burnedead and the Wonderous Wand Shop" (マッシュ・バーンデッドと杖の店, Masshu Bāndeddo to Tsue no Mise); 44. "Mash Burnedead and the Home Visit" (マッシュ・バーンデッドと実家, Masshu Bāndeddo to Jikka)
6	April 30, 2021	978-4-08-882639-4	May 17, 2022	978-1-9747-2902-9
45. "Rayne Ames and the Most Thrilling Magic User" (レイン・エイムズと刺激的な魔法使い, Rein Eimuzu to Shigeki-tekina Mahōtsukai); 46. "Rayne Ames and God's Gift" (レイン・エイムズと神に選ばれた力, Rein Eimuzu to Kami ni Eraba Reta Chikara); 47. "Mash Burnedead and the Selection Exam" (マッシュ・バーンデッドと選抜試験, Masshu Bāndeddo to Senbatsu Shiken); 48. "Mash Burnedead and the Lambs to the Slaughter" (マッシュ・バーンデッドと羊の死霊, Masshu Bāndeddo to Hitsuji no Shiryō); 49. "Mash Burnedead and the Brawny Balloon" (マッシュ・バーンデッドと強固な風船, Masshu Bāndeddo to Kyōkona Fūsen); 50. "Mash Burnedead and the Protein Shake-Up" (マッシュ・バーンデッドとプロテイン, Masshu Bāndeddo to Purotein); 51. "Mash Burnedead and the Shattered Crystal" (マッシュ・バーンデッドと割れた水晶, Masshu Bāndeddo to Wareta Suishō); 52. "Finn Ames and the Friend" (フィン・エイムズと友達, Fin Eimuzu to Tomodachi); 53. "Mash Burnedead and the Wand of Healing" (マッシュ・バーンデッドと治癒の杖, Masshu Bāndeddo to Chiyu no Tsue)
7	August 4, 2021	978-4-08-882728-5	July 19, 2022	978-1-9747-3205-0
54. "Mash Burnedead and the Rampaging Serve" (マッシュ・バーンデッドと暴走の庭球, Masshu Bāndeddo to Bōsō no Teikyū); 55. "Margarette Macaron and the Diminutive Duet" (マーガレット・マカロンと2人の試験者, Māgaretto Makaron to 2-ri no Shiken-sha); 56. "Mash Burnedead and the Visionary of Fire" (マッシュ・バーンデッドと炎の神覚者, Masshu Bāndeddo to Honō no Kami Kakuja); 57. "Mash Burnedead and You Look, You Lose Your Life" (マッシュ・バーンデッドと危ないアッチ向いてホイ, Masshu Bāndeddo to Abunai Atchi Muite Hoi); 58. "Mash Burnedead and the Final Exam" (マッシュ・バーンデッドと最終試験, Masshu Bāndeddo to Saishū Shiken); 59. "Mash Burnedead and the Magical Maestro" (マッシュ・バーンデッドと音の魔法使い, Masshu Bāndeddo to Oto no Mahōtsukai); 60. "Mash Burnedead and the Sinful Change" (マッシュ・バーンデッドと罪な突然変異, Masshu Bāndeddo to Tsumina Totsuzenhen'i); 61. "Mash Burnedead and the Sonic Chase" (マッシュ・バーンデッドと音速鬼ごっこ, Masshu Bāndeddo to Onsoku Onigokko); 62. "Mash Burnedead and the Great Danger" (マッシュ・バーンデッドと最大の危機, Masshu Bāndeddo to Saidai no Kiki)
8	October 4, 2021	978-4-08-882787-2	September 13, 2022	978-1-9747-3235-7
63. "Mash Burnedead and the Tall Tower" (マッシュ・バーンデッドと大きな塔, Masshu Bāndeddo to Ōkina Tō); 64. "Dot, Lance, and How Babies are Made" (ドットとランスと赤ちゃん魔法, Dotto to Ransu to Akachan Mahō); 65. "Mash Burnedead and Running in the Rain" (マッシュ・バーンデッドとランニング, Masshu Bāndeddo to Ran'ningu); 66. "Mash Burnedead and the Weighty Revelation" (マッシュ・バーンデッドと重ための人生, Masshu Bāndeddo to Omo Tame no Jinsei); 67. "Mash Burnedead and the Four Diamond Rings" (マッシュ・バーンデッドと4枚の金剛刃, Masshu Bāndeddo to 4-mai no Kongō ha); 68. "Wahlberg Baigan and the Magic of Darkness" (ウォールバーグ・バイガンと闇の魔法, Uōrubāgu Baigan to Yami no Mahō); 69. "Wahlberg Baigan and the Magic of Time" (ウォールバーグ・バイガンと時の魔法, Uōrubāgu Baigan to Toki no Mahō); 70. "Wahlberg Baigan and the Greatest Danger" (ウォールバーグ・バイガンと最大の危機, Uōrubāgu Baigan to Saidai no Kiki); 71. "Mash Burnedead and the Origin of the Greatest Magic User" (マッシュ・バーンデッドと最強の魔法使いの始まり, Masshu Bāndeddo to Saikyō no Mahō Tsukai no Hajimari); 72. "Mash Burnedead and the Giant's Chain" (マッシュ・バーンデッドと大きな綱, Masshu Bāndeddo to Ōkina Tsuna)
9	December 3, 2021	978-4-08-882844-2	November 15, 2022	978-1-9747-3419-1
73. "Mash Burnedead and the Summer of Fun" (マッシュ・バーンデッドと楽しい夏, Masshu Bāndeddo to Tanoshī Natsu); 74. "Mash Burnedead and the Challenge to End All Challenges" (マッシュ・バーンデッドと負けられない戦い, Masshu Bāndeddo to Make Rarenai Tatakai); 75. "Mash Burnedead and the Interesting Interview" (マッシュ・バーンデッドと口頭試問, Masshu Bāndeddo to Kōtō Shimon); 76. "Mash Burnedead and the Sand Spear Survival" (マッシュ・バーンデッドと耐え切れ砂の槍, Masshu Bāndeddo to Tae-gire Suna no Yari); 77. "Mash Burnedead and the Next Stage" (マッシュ・バーンデッドと次の試験, Masshu Bāndeddo to Tsugi no Shiken); 78. "Mash Burnedead and the Trimagicathlon Divine Visionary Final Exam" (マッシュ・バーンデッドと三魔対争神覚者最終試験, Masshu Bāndeddo to Sanma Taisō Shin Kakuja Saishū Shiken); 79. "Mash Burnedead and the School of Hard Knocks" (マッシュバーンデッドと実力主義魔法学校, Masshu Bāndeddo to Jitsuryoku Shugi Mahō Gakkō); 80. "Mash Burnedead and the Friendly Card Game" (マッシュバーンデッドとみんなでトランプ, Masshu Bāndeddo to Minna de Toranpu); 81. "Mash Burnedead and the Excellent Friends" (マッシュバーンデッドと良い友達, Masshu Bāndeddo to Yoi Tomodachi); 82. "Mash Burnedead and the Infancy" (マッシュバーンデッドと赤子の時, Masshu Bāndeddo to Akago no Toki)
10	March 4, 2022	978-4-08-883036-0	January 10, 2023	978-1-9747-3612-6
83. "Mash Burnedead and the Shadow Eater" (マッシュバーンデッドと影喰者, Masshu Bāndeddo to Shadou Ītā); 84. "Mash Burnedead and the Bugged-Out Magic User" (マッシュバーンデッドと昆虫の魔法使い, Masshu Bāndeddo to Konchū no Mahō Tsukai); 85. "Mash Burnedead and the Malicious Magnet-User" (マッシュバーンデッドと磁石の魔法使い, Masshu Bāndeddo to Jishaku no Mahō Tsukai); 86. "Lance Crown and the Wicked Whack-A-Mole" (ランス・クラウンと暴れるモグラ叩き, Ransu Kuraun to Abareru Mogura Tataki); 87. "Dot Barrett and the Two Foes Too Many" (ドット・バレットと2人の敵, Dotto Baretto to Futari no Teki); 88. "Dot Barrett and the Will to Succeed" (ドット・バレットと押し通す意地, Dotto Baretto to Oshitōsu Iji); 89. "Mash Burnedead and the Two Wands" (マッシュバーンデッドと2本目の杖, Masshu Bāndeddo to Nihon-me no Tsue); 90. "Mash Burnedead and the Electromagnetic Cannon" (マッシュバーンデッドと雷と磁石の大筒, Masshu Bāndeddo to Kaminari to Jishaku no Ōdzutsu); 91. "Mash Burnedead and the Magnetic Armor" (マッシュバーンデッドと磁石の鎧, Masshu Bāndeddo to Jishaku no Yoroi)
11	May 2, 2022	978-4-08-883097-1	March 14, 2023	978-1-9747-3664-5
92. "Mash Burnedead and the Bottomless Trap Hole" (マッシュ・バーンデッドと底なしの落とし穴, Masshu Bāndeddo to Sokonashi no Otoshiana); 93. "Mash Burnedead and the Water Magic User" (マッシュ・バーンデッドと水の魔法使い, Masshu Bāndeddo to Mizu no Mahō Tsukai); 94. "Mash Burnedead and the Water God's Fury" (マッシュ・バーンデッドと水の魔法使い, Masshu Bāndeddo to Mizu no Keshin no Ikari); 95. "Mash Burnedead and the God of Water" (マッシュ・バーンデッドと水の神, Masshu Bāndeddo to Mizu no Kami); 96. "Mash Burnedead and the Mobilization of Muscles" (マッシュ・バーンデッドと筋肉総動員, Masshu Bāndeddo to Kinniku Sōdōin); 97. "Mash Burnedead and the Endless Punch" (マッシュ・バーンデッドと無数の拳, Masshu Bāndeddo to Musū no Ken); 98. "Mash Burnedead and the Endgame" (マッシュ・バーンデッドと決着の時, Masshu Bāndeddo to Ketchaku no Toki); 99. "Mash Burnedead and the Powerful Duo" (マッシュ・バーンデッドと強い2人, Masshu Bāndeddo to Tsuyoi Futari); 100. "Mash Burnedead and the Strongest Assassin" (マッシュ・バーンデッドと最強の刺客, Masshu Bāndeddo to Saikyō no Shikaku)
12	July 4, 2022	978-4-08-883159-6	June 6, 2023	978-1-9747-3861-8
101. "Mash Burnedead and the Dark Magma" (マッシュ・バーンデッドと闇のマグマ, Masshu Bāndeddo to Yami no Maguma); 102. "Mash Burnedead and his Five Siblings" (マッシュ・バーンデッドと5人の兄弟, Masshu Bāndeddo to 5-ri no Kyōdai); 103. "Mash Burnedead and the Painful Panacea" (マッシュ・バーンデッドと痛めの治療, Masshu Bāndeddo to Itame no Chiryō); 104. "Mash Burnedead and the Plucked Tail" (マッシュ・バーンデッドと尻尾取り, Masshu Bāndeddo to Shippotori); 105. "Mash Burnedead and the Armor of Challenge" (マッシュ・バーンデッドと試練の鎧, Masshu Bāndeddo to Shiren no Yoroi); 106. "Mash Burnedead and the Reasons to Fight" (マッシュ・バーンデッドと戦う理由, Masshu Bāndeddo to Tatakau no Riyū); 107. "Mash Burnedead and Friends and Training to Grow Strong" (マッシュ・バーンデッド達と強くなるための修行, Masshu Bāndeddo Tachi to Tsuyoku Naru Tame no Shugyō); 108. "Mash Burnedead and Friends and Training's End" (マッシュ・バーンデッド達と, Masshu Bāndeddo Tachi to); 109. "Ryoh Grantz and the Evil Giant" (ライオ・グランツと悪の巨人, Raio Gurantsu to Aku no Kyojin)
13	October 4, 2022	978-4-08-883258-6	September 12, 2023	978-1-9747-4047-5
110. "The Divine Visionaries and the Army of Evil" (神覚者たちと悪の軍団, Shinkakusha-tachi to Aku no Gundan); 111. "The Divine Visionaries and the Sinister Siblings" (神覚者たちと最凶のご兄弟, Shinkakushatachi to Saikyō no Go Kyōdai); 112. "Mash Burnedead and the Symbol of Peace" (マッシュ・バーンデッドと平和の象徴, Masshu Bāndeddo to Heiwa no Shōchō); 113. "Ryoh Grantz and the Defense of the City" (ライオ・グランツと市術防衛, Raio Gurantsu to Ichi-jutsu Bōei); 114. "Ryoh Grantz and the Final Fight" (ライオ・グランツたちと最後の戦い, Raio Gurantsu Tachi to Saigo no Tatakai); 115. "Finn Ames and the Twin Gate Guards" (フェン・エイムズと2人の門番, Fin Eimuzu to 2-Ri no Monban); 116. "Ryoh Grantz Et Al and Storming the Castle" (ライオ・グランツたちと敵の侵入, Raio Gurantsu Tachi to Teki no Shin'nyū); 117. "Rayne Ames and the Strongest Pole Arm User" (レイン・エイムズと最強の鉾使い, Rein Eimuzu to Saikyō no Hoko Tsukai); 118. "Rayne Ames and the Determined Decision" (レイン・エイムズと決めたこと, Rein Eimuzu to Kimeta Koto)
14	December 2, 2022	978-4-08-883403-0	December 12, 2023	978-1-9747-4107-6
119. "Rayne Ames and the Family of Two" (レイン・エイムズと2人だけの家族, Rein Eimuzu to 2-Ri Dake no Kazoku); 120. "Lance Crown and Dot Barrett" (ランス・クラウンとドット・バレット, Ransu Kuraun to Dotto Baretto); 121. "Dot Barrett and the Limits of Tolerance" (ドット・バレットと気に食わないもの, Dotto Baretto to Kinikuwanai Mono); 122. "Lance Crown and the Unexpected Decision" (ランス・クラウンと予想外のこと, Ransu Kuraun to Yosō-gai no Koto); 123. "Dot Barrett and the Hundred-Fold Rage" (ドット・バレットと100回の怒り, Dotto Baretto to 100-kai no Ikari); 124. "Orter Madl and the Circus of Death" (オーター・マドルと死のサーカス, Ōtā Madoru to Shi no Sākasu); 125. "Orter Madl and the Opponent Unseen" (オーター・マドルと見えない敵, Ōtā Madoru to Mienai Teki); 126. "Lemon Irvine and the Tattooed Tamer" (レモン・アーヴィンと墨の獣使い, Remon Āvin to Boku no Kemono Tsukai); 127. "Lance Crown, Dot Barrett, and the Eldest Son" (ランス・クラウンとドット・バレットと長男, Ransu Kuraun to Dotto Baretto to Chōnan)
15	February 3, 2023	978-4-08-883426-9	March 12, 2024	978-1-9747-4323-0
128. "The Ames Siblings and the Eldest Brother" (エイムズ兄弟と長男, Eimuzu Kyōdai to Chōnan); 129. "Orter Madl and the Eldest Son" (オーター・マドルと長男, Ōtā Madoru to Chōnan); 130. "The Visionaries and the Eldest Son" (新覚者たちと長男, Shinkakushatachi to Chōnan); 131. "The Light Visionary and the Eldest Son" (光の新覚者と最強の長男, Hikari no Shinkakusha to Saikyō no Chōnan); 132. "Ryoh Grantz and the Massive Miscalculation" (ライオ・グランツと大きな誤算, Raio Gurantsu to Ōkina Gosan); 133. "Finn Ames and Staunch Fellowship" (フィン・エイムズと仲間たち, Fin Eimuzu to Nakama-tachi); 134. "Ryoh Grantz and The Last Resort" (ライオ・グランツと奥の手, Raio Gurantsu to Okunote); 135. "Ryoh Grantz and the Definition of Handsome" (ライオ・グランツと男前, Raio Gurantsu to Otokomae); 136. "Mash Burnedead and the Unstoppable Doom" (マッシュ・バーンデッドと最強の長男ドゥウム, Masshu Bāndeddo to Saikyō no Chōnan Dūmu)
16	April 4, 2023	978-4-08-883447-4	June 11, 2024	978-1-9747-4582-1
137. "Mash Burnedead and the Unlocked Power" (マッシュ・バーンデッドと新しい力, Masshu Bāndeddo to Atarashī Chikara); 138. "Mash Burnedead and the Magic of Mirrors" (マッシュ・バーンデッドと鏡の魔法, Masshu Bāndeddo to Kagami no Mahō); 139. "Mash Burnedead and the Quadruple Mirage" (マッシュ・バーンデッドと4人の幻影, Masshu Bāndeddo to 4-nin no Genei); 140. "Mash Burnedead and the Ultimate Form" (マッシュ・バーンデッドと究極の形, Masshu Bāndeddo to Kyūkyoku no Katachi); 141. "Mash Burnedead and the Hundred Copies" (マッシュ・バーンデッドと百の分身, Masshu Bāndeddo to Hyaku no Bunshin); 142. "Mash Burnedead and the Final Foe" (マッシュ・バーンデッドと最後の敵, Masshu Bāndeddo to Saigo no Teki); 143. "Mash Burnedead and the Withered Arms" (マッシュ・バーンデッドと枯れた腕, Masshu Bāndeddo to Kareta Ude); 144. "Mash Burnedead and the Desperate Straits" (マッシュ・バーンデッドと絶対絶命, Masshu Bāndeddo to Zettai Zetsumei); 145. "Mash Burnedead and the Secret Savior" (マッシュ・バーンデッドと秘密の助っ人, Masshu Bāndeddo to Himitsu no Suketto)
17	July 4, 2023	978-4-08-883568-6	September 3, 2024	978-1-9747-4885-3
146. "Domina Blowelive and the Ideal Redemption" (ドミナ・ブローライブとありたい姿, Domina Burōraibu to Aritai Sugata); 147. "Orter Madl and the Logical Decision" (オーター・マドルと合理的選択, Ōtā Madoru to Gōri-teki Sentaku); 148. "Mash Burnedead and the Door's Demand" (マッシュ・バーンデッドと対価の扉, Masshu Bāndeddo to Taika no Tobira); 149. "Innocent Zero and the Unstoppable Magic" (無邪気な淵源と無敵の魔法, Mujakina Engen to Muteki no Mahō); 150. "Ochoa and the Choice of Betrayal" (オチョアと裏切りの選択, Ochoa to Uragiri no Sentaku); 151. "Lance Crown and the Final Holdout" (ランス・クラウンと最後の粘り, Ransu Kuraun to Saigo no Nebari); 152. "Ochoa and the Great Struggle" (オチョアと大きな葛藤, Ochoa to Ōkina Kattō); 153. "Mash Burnedead and the Time-slowing Magic" (マッシュ・バーンデッドと時を遅くする魔法, Masshu Bāndeddo to Toki o Osoku suru Mahō); 154. "Mash Burnedead and the How Could You...!!" (マッシュ・バーンデッドといくらなんでもそれは..., Masshu Bāndeddo to Ikura nan Demo sore Wa...)
18	October 4, 2023	978-4-08-883668-3	December 3, 2024	978-1-9747-4951-5
155. "Mash Burnedead and the Mage Who Became a God" (マッシュ・バーンデッドと神になった魔法使い, Masshu Bāndeddo to Kami ni Natta Mahōtsukai); 156. "Mash Burnedead and the Magical Barrage" (マッシュ・バーンデッドと近づけない魔法の乱撃, Masshu Bāndeddo to Chikadzukenai Mahō no Rangeki); 157. "Mash Burnedead and the Reformed Rivals" (マッシュ・バーンデッドとかつての強敵たち, Masshu Bāndeddo to Katsute no Kyōteki-tachi); 158. "Mash Burnedead and the Power of Everyone" (マッシュ・バーンデッドとみんなの力, Masshu Bāndeddo to Min'nano Chikara); 159. "Mash Burnedead and the Magic of Rewind" (マッシュ・バーンデッドと時を戻す魔法, Masshu Bāndeddo to Toki o Modosu Mahō); 160. "Mash Burnedead and the World-consuming Darkness" (マッシュ・バーンデッドと世界を飲み込む黒い闇, Masshu Bāndeddo to Sekai o Nomikomu kuroi Yami); 161. "Mash Burnedead and the Divine Visionary" (マッシュ・バーンデッドと神覚者, Masshu Bāndeddo to Shinkakusha); 162. "Mash Burnedead and the Generally Happy Ending" (最終話 マッシュ・バーンデッドとなんやかんやの幸せ, Masshu Bāndeddo to nan Yakan ya no Shiawase)
