= List of Mashle characters =

Main characters of the series. From left to right: Finn Ames, Mash Burnedead, Lemon Irvine, Lance Crown, and Dot Barrett

The manga series Mashle: Magic and Muscles features an extensive cast of characters created by Hajime Kōmoto.

== Main characters ==
=== Mash Burnedead ===
Voiced by: Chiaki Kobayashi (anime), Natsuki Hanae (2021 PV) (Japanese); Aleks Le (English)
Portrayed by: Mackenyu (live-action film)

Mash Burnedead (マッシュ・バーンデッド, Masshu Bāndeddo) is a young man born without magic, but makes up for it with incredible physical abilities that seem to defy logic. He loves cream puffs and is often seen eating and/or making them. Despite his blunt personality and permanently deadpan expression, Mash is a very kind and selfless person. He has a unique fighting style he dubs "Muscle Magic", which uses his physical power to perform unpredictable moves, and carries an Iron Wand which he can forcibly shape into various sports equipment.

The character and his predicaments have been interpreted as a representation and/or metaphor of neurodivergence.

=== Finn Ames ===
Voiced by: Reiji Kawashima (anime), Natsuki Hanae (2021 PV) (Japanese); Brian Timothy Anderson (English)

Finn Ames (フィン・エイムズ, Fin Eimuzu) is Mash's roommate in the academy. He usually plays the straight man to the other characters' antics, and is quick to cower in fear. His older brother is Rayne Ames, a current Divine Visionary. His personal magic allows him to swap the positions of people and objects.

=== Lance Crown ===
Voiced by: Kaito Ishikawa (anime), Natsuki Hanae (2021 PV) (Japanese); Stephen Fu (English)

Lance Crown (ランス・クラウン, Ransu Kuraun) is Mash's true rival. After his sister caught a disease that'll deplete her magic, he vowed to become a Divine Visionary so she would not be killed by the law of the country. His most notable character quirk is his sister complex and is deathly afraid of bugs and ghosts. His personal magic allows him to manipulate gravity.

=== Dot Barrett ===
Voiced by: Takuya Eguchi (anime), Natsuki Hanae (2021 PV) (Japanese); Benjamin Diskin (English)

Dot Barrett (ドット・バレット, Dotto Baretto) is Mash's self-proclaimed rival. Dot is a hot-blooded and easily irritated person with a superiority complex but is actually a good person at heart. He has a cross on his forehead that increases his magic power. His personal magic allows him to generate explosions.

=== Lemon Irvine ===
Voiced by: Reina Ueda (Japanese); Anjali Kunapaneni (English)

Lemon Irvine (レモン・アーヴィン, Remon Āvin) is Mash's self-proclaimed fiancée. Lemon comes from a poor family and came to Easton Magic Academy in order to help them. She fell in love with Mash after he assisted her during a test and misunderstood his words of reassurance for a proposal. Lemon is a soft-spoken and somewhat kooky girl. Her personal magic allows her to create cuffs and other sorts of binding equipment such as chains and manacles.

== Easton Magic Academy Staff ==
=== Wahlberg Baigan ===
Voiced by: Mugihito Wataru Hatano (young) (Japanese); David Lodge (English)

Wahlberg Baigan (ウォールバーグ・バイガン, Uōrubāgu Baigan) is the headmaster of Easton and was once a Divine Visionary in the past. He, along with Meliadoul and Innocent Zero were the pupils of Adam Jobs, the mage who built the current society of magic users. His personal magic allows him to manipulate space.

== Adler House ==
=== Rayne Ames ===
Voiced by: Yuki Kaji (Japanese); Ray Chase (English)

Rayne Ames (レイン・エイムズ, Rein Eimuzu) is the newest of the Divine Visionaries and the older brother of Finn. He has a serious personality, but he has a soft spot for bunnies, cares for Finn and Mash, and is rather gullible. His personal magic allows him to create and manipulate swords. His title as a Visionary is "The Sword Cane" and he is the house prefect for Adler.

=== Tom Knowles ===
Voiced by: Wataru Komada (Japanese); Kaiji Tang (English)

Tom Knowles (トム・ノエルズ, Tomu Noeruzu) is a senior at the Alder House and a member of the Duelo team. Similar to Dot, he is a very hot-blooded person, but is a lot more friendly and energetic if a bit more dense than him. One of Tom's most defining character quirks is his odd habit of comparing people to bamboo.

=== Max Land ===
Voiced by: Makoto Furukawa (Japanese); Clifford Chapin (English)

Max Land (マックス・ランド, Makkusu Rando) is a senior at Alder House and a Divine Visionary candidate. He is good friends with Rayne as he joined the Divine Visionary Exams in order to protect his juniors, whom he cares a lot for. His personal magic allows him to manipulate the size of objects.

== Lang House ==
=== Abel Walker ===
Voiced by: Yūichirō Umehara (Japanese); Howard Wang (English)

Abel Walker (アベル・ウォーカー, Aberu Wōkā) is the prefect of Lang House and the leader of the Magia Lupus. Abel is a noble who believes that all humans, including himself, are mere beasts who need to be controlled. He also possesses a hatred for peasants due to his mother having been murdered by one despite trying to help them. His personal magic allows him to create, manipulate, and transform people into puppets.

=== Abyss Razor ===
Voiced by: Yuki Kaida (2021 PV), Hiroki Nanami (anime) (Japanese); Marin Miller (English)

Abyss Razor (アビス・レイザー, Abisu Reizā) is the second Fang of the Magia Lupus and Abel's best friend. Due to having the "Evil Eye" (a special ability that allows the user to nullify another's magic temporarily), Abyss has been feared and hated by society his entire life until he met Abel, leading him to be incredibly self-conscious about his eye and undyingly loyal to Abel. His magic allows him to conjure arrows that enable him to move at speeds too quick for the eye to catch.

=== Wirth Mádl ===
Voiced by: Kent Itō (Japanese); Daman Mills (English)

Wirth Mádl (ワース・マドル, Wāsu Madoru) is the third Fang of the Magia Lupus. Due to his father being a high-ranking member of the Bureau of Magic and his older brother being a Divine Visionary, Wirth is under a lot of pressure to rise higher in society. His personal magic allows him to manipulate mud.

=== Milo Genius ===
Voiced by: Shūichirō Umeda (Japanese); Caleb Yen (English)

Milo Genius (マイロ・ジェーニアス, Mairo Jēniasu) is the fourth Fang of the Magia Lupus. He is a first year and is considered a prodigy among the Magia Lupus. His personal magic allows him to manipulate stone.

=== Love Cute ===
Voiced by: Aoi Koga (Japanese); LilyPichu (English)

Love Cute (ラブ・キュート, Rabu Kyūto) is the fifth Fang of the Magia Lupus. She is arrogant and believes that everyone exists to serve her. Her personal magic allows her to summon tornados.

=== Olore Andrew ===
Voiced by: Kenji Nomura (Japanese); Bill Butts (English)

Olore Andrew (オロル・アンドリュー, Ororu Andoryū) is the sixth Fang of the Magia Lupus. In spite of his unusual appearance, Olore is actually a very down-to-earth kind of guy. His personal magic allows him to create an underwater pocket dimension as well as transform himself into a shark.

=== Anser Shinri ===
Voiced by: Kengo Kawanishi (Japanese); Lucien Dodge (English)

Anser Shinri (アンサー・シンリ, Ansā Shinri) is the seventh Fang of the Magia Lupus. He always states the obvious, as if it were profound. His personal magic allows him to control shuriken, which he can change the size of.

== Orca House ==
=== Margarette Macaron ===
Voiced by: Takehito Koyasu (Japanese); Kayleigh McKee (English)

Margarette Macaron (マーガレット・マカロン, Māgaretto Makaron) is the house prefect and a double liner —a line in the shape of a treble clef on the right side of their face, and a quarter note beneath their left eye. Initially presented as a tall buff man with a buzzcut, Margarette's true form—a petite androgynous person with wavy hair—was revealed when their magic "metamorphosed" during their one-on-one against Mash in the second round of the Visionary exam. They are obsessed with tartar sauce and strong opponents, believing that "boredom is death". Their personal magic allows them to manipulate sound. Margarette is non-binary.

=== Carpaccio Luo-Yang ===
Voiced by: Koki Uchiyama (Japanese); Griffin Puatu (English)

Carpaccio Luo-Yang (カルパッチョ・ローヤン, Karupaccho Rōyan) is a first year student who was chosen by a Master Cane that grants him the inability to feel pain as the damage is absorbed by a goddess statue. His magic allows him to transfer damage to his enemies. Combined with his Master Cane, it allows Carpaccio to hurt his opponents off guard by attacking himself with a dagger, without sustaining any pain or injury.

== Divine Visionaries ==
=== Ryoh Grantz ===
Voiced by: Junichi Suwabe (Japanese); Sean Chiplock (English)

Ryoh Grantz (ライオ・グランツ, Raio Gurantsu) is the Light Cane and captain of the Magic Security Forces. He is very vain, considering himself the most handsome man and the greatest magic user, but is indeed incredibly skilled, kind and supportive towards citizens and anyone he deems "hot stuff", and serves as an ally to Mash. His personal magic allows him to manipulate incredibly fast and powerful beams of light, which can slice through anything.

=== Orter Mádl ===
Voiced by: Yūki Ono (Japanese); Alan Lee (English)

Orter Mádl (オーター・マドル, Ōtā Madoru) is the Desert Cane and a member of the Magical Power Administration. The elder brother of Wirth Mádl, third Fang of Lang's Magia Lupus. He is cruel and ruthless, willing to resort to extreme measures to maintain the current world order, and plots to kill Mash. His personal magic allows him to manipulate sand, granting him incredible versatility in both offense and defense.

=== Kaldo Gehenna ===
Voiced by: Nobunaga Shimazaki (Japanese); Zeno Robinson (English)

Kaldo Gehenna (カルド・ゲヘナ, Karudo Gehena) is the Flame Cane and head of the Magic Talent Administration. Despite his cheeriness, Kaldo is harsh and cunning, yet has a fondness for honey and adds ludicrous amounts to anything he eats, even sashimi. His personal magic allows him to manipulate fire, and he wields a sword enchanted with black flames that eternally burn anything the blade touches.

=== Renatus Revol ===
Voiced by: Kishō Taniyama (Japanese); Darius Marquis Johnson (English)

Renatus Revol (レナトス・リボル, Renatosu Riboru) is the Immortal Cane and a member of the Magical Cemetery Administration. He is rather lazy, whiny, and forgetful, but is incredibly powerful, even among the Visionaries. His personal magic allows him to summon undead body parts and renders him immortal, able to regenerate from any possible injury.

=== Tsurara Halestone ===
Voiced by: Tomori Kusunoki (Japanese); Lisa Reimold (English)

Tsurara Halestone (ツララ・ヘイルストーン, Tsurara Heirusutōn) is the Ice Cane and a member of the Magic Research Administration. She is timid, clumsy, and always cold. Her personal magic allows her to freeze anything, though she resents it and wishes her magic were something warm instead.

=== Agito Tyrone ===
Agito Tyrone (アギト・タイロン, Agito Tairon) is the Dragon Cane and a member of the Magical Creatures Administration. He is quiet and emotional, believing that life itself is inherently selfish, sinful, and painful, and suffers from an existential crisis as a result. His personal magic allows him to control his pet dragon and transform it into a larger form.

=== Sophina Biblia ===
Voiced by: Saori Hayami (Japanese); Cristina Vee (English)

Sophina Biblia (ソフィナ・ブリビア, Sofina Biburia) is the Knowledge Cane and a member of the Forbidden Magical Texts Administration. She is calm, polite, and logical. Her personal magic allows her to manipulate the words, and consequently, the actions of her targets.

== Innocent Zero Group ==
Innocent Zero (イノセントゼロ, Inosento Zero) is a criminal organization of dark magic users whose criminal activities range from conspiracy, mass murder, human trafficking, and the smuggling of magical creatures and drugs.

=== Innocent Zero ===
Voiced by: Shin-ichiro Miki (Japanese); Jalen K. Cassell (English)

Innocent Zero (イノセントゼロ, Inosento Zero) is the main antagonist of the series and leader of the criminal organization of the same name who has the power to change his appearance, and usually takes the form of a featureless humanoid. Seeking to become the ultimate human being, he has stolen countless magics and fathered six sons to sacrifice to complete an immortal body, with five of them being his organization's Devil's Quintuplets and Mash being the youngest of them. His personal magic allows him to manipulate time.

=== Devil's Quintuplets ===
The Devil's Quintuplets (悪魔の五つ子, Akuma no Itsutsuko) are a group of five powerful magic users within the Innocent Zero group who are the eponymous leader's sons.

==== Doom ====
Doom (ドゥウム, Dūmu) is Innocent Zero's eldest son who has a surprisingly noble personality. Doom enjoys battling and prefers not to fight weaker opponents, but follows Innocent Zero's every command, even if it pits him against weaker opponents. He wields a massive sword named Caladbolg, and is a Master Cane user who uses his magic power to boost his physical abilities to inhuman levels, surpassing even Mash's strength. His personal magic allows him to mirror his movements as well as create mirror duplicates of himself.

==== Famin ====
Famin (ファーミン, Fāmin) is Innocent Zero's second son who is twisted, sadistic, selfish, and completely unpredictable; even Innocent Zero and his sons are wary of him. His personal magic allows him to turn things invisible. He applies this power to attack with a set of playing cards, which also collectively serve as his wand.

==== Epidem ====
Epidem (エピデム, Epidemu) is Innocent Zero's third son who he an incredible love for pudding, praising it with song, and falls into a demented rage when it is ruined. He has even formed an entire religion around it, called Puddinology. He normally acts polite, but this hides his sadism. His personal magic allows him to create and manipulate orichalcum. He is eventually defeated by Lance Crown and Dot Barrett.

==== Delisaster ====
Delisaster (デリザスタ, Derizasuta) is Innocent Zero's fourth son who is laidback, narcissistic, and never takes anything seriously as a result of his incredible power and skill. He is also a heavy partier. His personal magic allows him to create and control guandao polearms.

=== Cell War ===
Voiced by: Natsuki Hanae (Japanese); Brandon McInnis (English)

Cell War (セル・ウォー, Seru Wō) is a clone human created by Innocent Zero and a core member of his organization, he is cruel and sadistic, yet is easily wounded by dismissive or mean comments. His personal magic allows him to create and manipulate carbon, and by extension, diamonds.

=== Criminal Canes ===
The Criminal Canes (犯罪者の杖, Hanzai-sha no Tsue) are a group of six magic users and former death row inmates at Hecatrice (ヘカトリス, Hekatorisu) who were broken out by the Innocent Zero group.

==== Jon Pierre ====
Voiced by: Satoru Itou

Jon Pierre (ジョン・ピエール, Jon Piēru) is a serial killer and cannibal who was locked up in Hecatrice, and speaks with a dignified tone. His personal magic allows him to create giant kitchen utensils.

==== Sitter Baby ====
Voiced by: Tatsumaru Tachibana

Sitter Baby (シッター・ベイビー, Shittā Beibī) is a sadistic, yet cowardly man whose personal magic allows him to transform himself or others into babies, devoid of any experience or skills.

==== Gail Garrett ====
Voiced by: Haruki Ishiya

Gail Garett (ゲイル・ギャレット, Geiru Gyaretto) is a vicious mage, whose wand is shaped like a pair of scissors and he is one of the Criminal Canes.

==== Necross Mance ====
Voiced by: Masaaki Mizunaka

Necross Mance (ネクロス・マンス, Nekurosu Mansu) is an eerie mage, who is dressed like a priest. He has got two magic marks, which appear underneath each of his eyes, running diagonally across his cheeks. His personal magic allows him to control others, using strings and even use their magic.

== Walkis Magic Academy ==
A top-three Magic School that believes that power is everything.

=== Domina Blowelive ===
Voiced by: Soma Saito

Domina Blowelive (ドミナ・ブローライブ, Domina Burōraibu) is the top student at Walkis, a member of Innocent Zero's Devil's Quintuplets, and the eponymous leader's fifth son. He seems calm and collected, but this is a façade to hide his immense anger, hatred, and rage, and he seeks to earn his father's approval. After Mash defeated him at full power, Innocent Zero arrived at the arena—with his son, Doom and proceeded to fight until they sensed the presence of several visionaries. As a result, Innocent Zero unleashed magma on the spent Mash; after experiencing the first bit of genuine kindness from anyone, Domina sacrificed his life for Mash to escape, although he was saved by Ryoh. His personal magic allowed him to manipulate water in devastating ways, such as a water prison, high-pressure lasers, and turning into the water to avoid all damage.

=== Lévis Rosequartz ===
Voiced by: Ryōta Suzuki

Lévis Rosequartz (レヴィ・ローズクォーツ, Revi Rōzukwōtsu) is the Bureau of Magic Chief's son. He believes people's worth and power are decided by birth from their standing in society and is willing to commit any act to come out on top. This belief stems from Lévis' upbringing with his twin brother, who was superior to him but hid his talents so Lévis would no longer be the target of their father's abuse. He wears an eyepatch to cover his injured eye. He has two personal magics: one allows him to manipulate magnetism and create magnets of various shapes; the other allows him to manipulate electricity.

=== Charles Contini ===
Charles Contini (シャルル・コンティーニ, Sharuru Kontīni) is a student with a French accent and a severe mother complex, standing in contrast to Lance's sister complex. His personal magic allows him to create portals.

=== Galuf Gargaron ===
Galuf Gargaron (ガルフ・ ガルガロン, Garufu Garugaron) is a tall boy with curly hair with bulging eyes and always has his tongue out. His personal magic allows him to manipulate acid.

== Other characters ==
=== Regro Burnedead ===
Voiced by: Chō, Sora Handa (young) (Japanese); Kirk Thornton, Dave Wallace (young) (English)

Regro Burnedead (レグロ・バーンデッド, Reguro Bāndeddo) is Mash's 75-year old adoptive father, who is a single-liner magic user, but tried to raise Mash as best he could, in the wilderness away from people, so he would not be persecuted.

=== Brad Coleman ===
Voiced by: Katsuyuki Konishi (Japanese); Patrick Seitz (English)

Brad Coleman (ブラッド コールマン, Buraddo Kōruman) is a police officer, who first discovered Mash and attempted to capture him, but was defeated by him. Seeing he was outmatched, Brad made a deal with Mash, giving him a fake mark and helping him to enroll at Easton Magic Academy, in order for Mash to become a Divine Visionary. Brad is a slightly corrupt cop who abused criminals as stress relief, due to his hatred of paperwork.

=== Anna Crown ===
Voiced by: Riona Imaizumi (Japanese); Lisa Reimold (English)

Anna Crown (アンナ・クラウン, An'na Kuraun) is Lance's little sister, who contracted a mysterious magical disease which shaves away her magic powers and life force.

=== Meliadoul Amy ===
Meliadoul Amy (メリアドール・エイミー, Meriadōru Eimī) is one of oldest and strongest living mages at 118 years old, who was once founder Adam Jobs' student, alongside Innocent Zero and Wahlberg. Her unique magic allows strengthening at a cellular level, as well as healing, while also granting her physical strength and speed close to Mash or Doom. She is a cheerful, but strict person, who worked Mash to the bone, in order to get him ready for the fight against Zero.

=== Adam Jobs ===
Voiced by: Toshihiko Seki

Adam Jobs (アダム・ジョブズ, Adamu Jobuzu) was Wahlberg, Meliadoul, and Innocent Zero's master. He is said to be the architect of what would become the Divine Visionary and the founder of the Bureau of Magic. The current society of magic users was built by him. He had vast Influence over the Community but his later years were spent on the public assistance of those unable to use magic. His personal magic was Darkness, which allowed him to manipulate darkness which returned everything it hit to the void, effectively erasing its targets from existence.
