= Aleks Le =

American voice actor (born 1999)

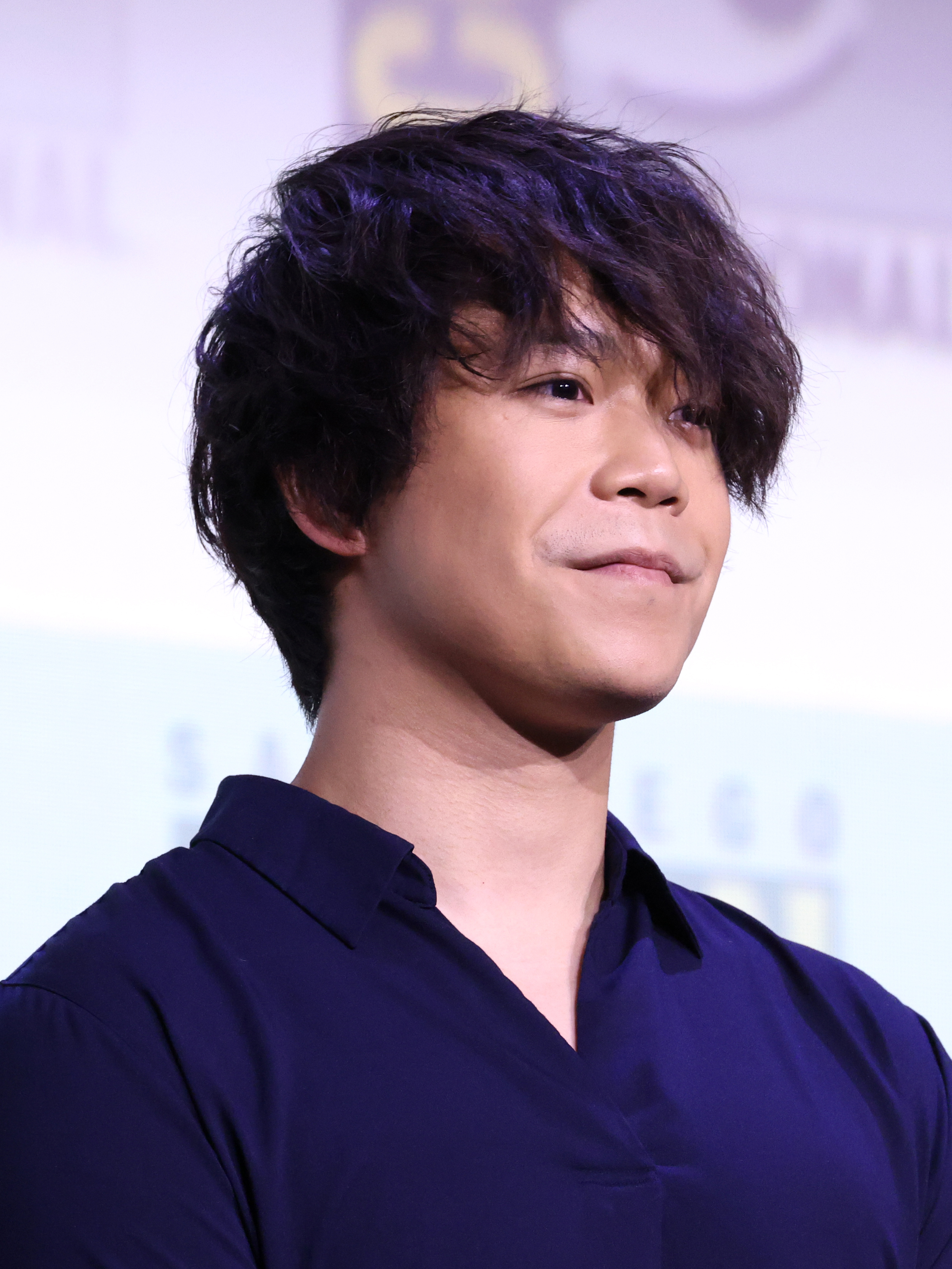
- Le at San Diego Comic-Con 2025
- Born: March 12, 1999 (age 27); Hanoi, Vietnam
- Occupation: Voice actor
- Years active: 2018–present
- Agent: Atlas Talent Agency
- Notable work: Zenitsu Agatsuma in Demon Slayer: Kimetsu no Yaiba; Sung Jin-woo in Solo Leveling; Manjiro "Mikey" Sano in Tokyo Revengers; Makoto Yuki in Persona 3 Reload; Luke Sullivan in Street Fighter; Mash Burnedead in Mashle: Magic and Muscles; Thorfinn in Vinland Saga (Netflix dub)

Instagram information
- Page: aleksle.vo
- Followers: 540K

TikTok information
- Page: Aleksminle
- Followers: 967K

Twitch information
- Channel: AleksLeVO
- Followers: 68K

X information
- Handle: @AleksLeVO
- Followers: 258K

YouTube information
- Channel: Aleks Le
- Years active: 2016–present
- Genres: Gaming; voice acting; internet memes
- Subscribers: 801K
- Views: 96.6 million
- Last updated: July 2026
- Website: aleksle.com

Aleks Min Le (born March 12, 1999) is an American voice actor recognized for his performances in English-language dubs of anime, video games, and animated series. He rose to prominence as the English voice of Zenitsu Agatsuma in Demon Slayer: Kimetsu no Yaiba. He won Best Voice Artist Performance (English) at the 2025 Crunchyroll Anime Awards for his role as Sung Jin-woo in Solo Leveling. Other notable voice roles include Luke Sullivan in the Street Fighter series, the protagonist in Persona 3 Reload, Sonon Kusakabe in Final Fantasy VII Rebirth, Matt Murdock / Daredevil in Marvel Rivals, and Manjiro "Mikey" Sano in Tokyo Revengers. Le is represented by Atlas Talent Agency and has made guest appearances at conventions including Anime Expo and Otakon.

== Early life and education ==
Le was born in Hanoi, Vietnam. He lived in several countries across Asia before moving to the United States at the age of 10. Having no understanding of the English language prior to his arrival, he had taught himself by watching cartoons and playing video games. He had an admiration for anime, and often drew Kakashi Hatake from Naruto, initially being aspired to become a manga artist from a young age.

Le moved to Vancouver, Canada alone during his adolescence. He became interested in powerlifting at the age of 14. Wanting to become a personal trainer, he stopped after an injury to his elbow and shoulder.

He did freelance work as both an artist and graphic designer and had even designed a logo for a local restaurant. Additionally, he began a job delivering mail for a local post office.

Le later moved to Florida due to a visa expiration. He briefly attended community college before dropping out to completely shift his focus to voice acting. Unable to afford formal acting classes, he began studying his favorite performances to recreate them. (Note: https://www.youtube.com/watch?v=j-tYHgZez5o&list=LL&index=66) In an interview with Tokyo Weekender, he stated that he would "do 16-18 hour days of just practicing and doing auditions."

== Career ==
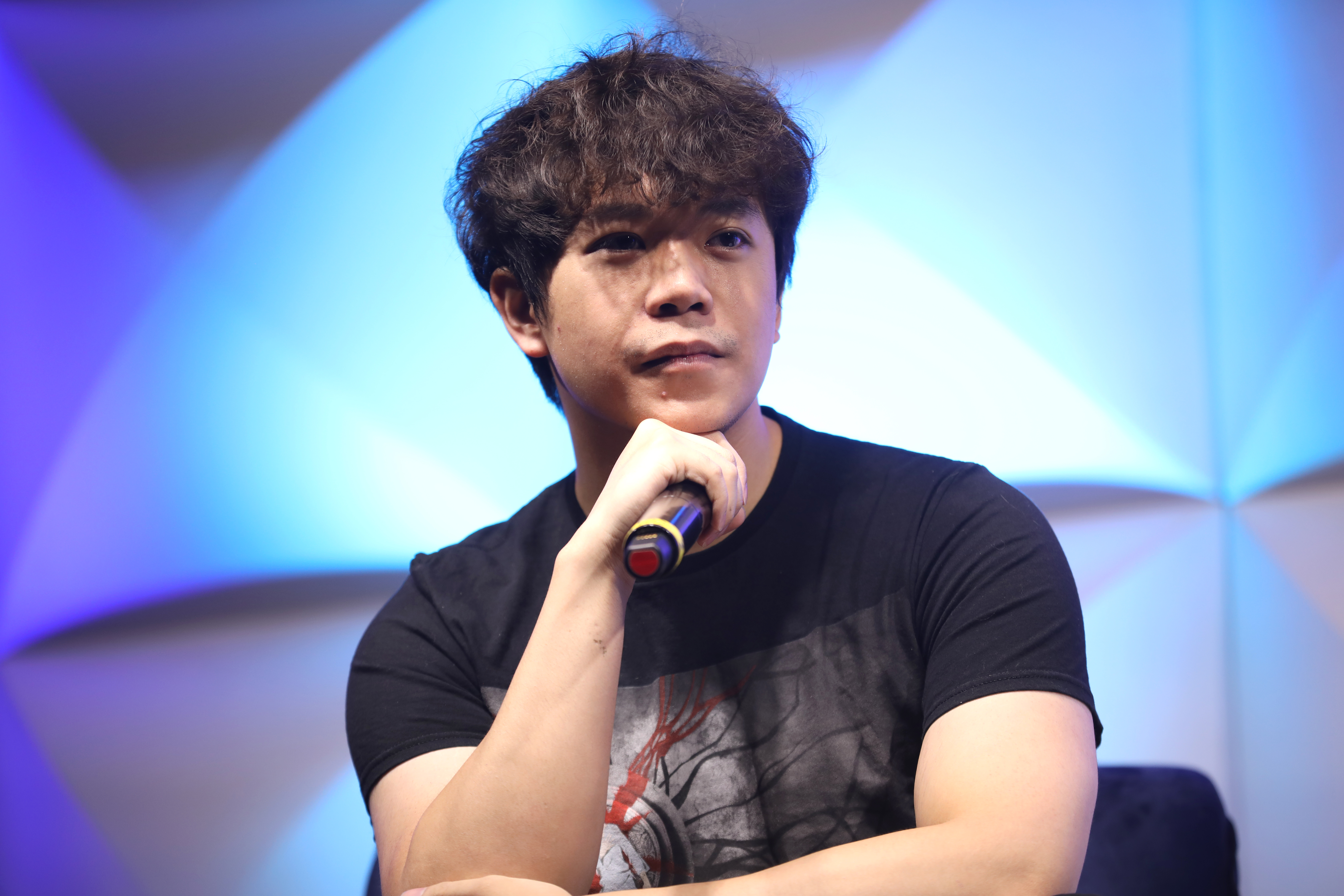
Le speaking to fans at Phoenix Fan Fusion 2024.

He began his voice acting career in 2018, making his Los Angeles debut as the voice of Dahar in The Laws of The Universe: Part 1. He later voice acted in other anime projects as Seijuro Akashi in Kuroko's Basketball and Alexis Deux from Record of Grancrest War. The following year, Le achieved his breakout role when he provided the voice for Zenitsu Agatsuma in Demon Slayer: Kimetsu no Yaiba, which became one of the highest-grossing anime franchises worldwide. In October 2022, he and voice actor Jonah Scott launched the YouTube channel VO to Go, which was supported by Sony Music Entertainment Japan and focused on exploring the voice acting industry.

Le voiced Manjiro "Mikey" Sano in the English dub of Tokyo Revengers. In a 2021 interview with CBR, Le discussed his connection to Mikey's duality, noting that he found aspects of himself in the character and emphasized the importance of compassion for others. In May 2023, he was announced as part of the dubbing cast of Mashle: Magic and Muscles, voicing the character Mash Burnedead. He appeared at an Anime NYC panel in August 2024 alongside anime staff and the hip hop duo Creepy Nuts, dressed in Mash's school robe and holding cream puffs. During the panel, he said that he resonated with his outcast character and noted that portraying him was challenging due to his monotone voice.

In March 2024, Le was announced to be the English voice of Sung Jin-woo, the main character of Solo Leveling. In an interview with CBR, he mentioned that he had taken cues from the original Japanese voice actor Taito Ban, who served as a significant source of inspiration for his performance. At the end of its season 1 run, he responded to fans who threatened him over his delivery of the dialogue "Arise." He jokingly suggested that he might change it to something different while urging fans to ground their expectations. Despite the criticism, he was nominated for Best Voice Artist Performance (English) at the 9th Crunchyroll Anime Awards, ultimately winning the category as Solo Leveling won multiple other awards. At the 4th Astra TV Awards in 2024, when Solo Leveling won the award for Best Anime Series, Le accepted the award on behalf of Aniplex, A-1 Pictures, and Crunchyroll. He reprised his role as Sung Jin-Woo in Solo Leveling: ReAwakening, a theatrical recap and preview of the second season.

In August 2024, it was announced that Le would join the cast of Dandadan, voicing the character Jin "Jiji" Enjoji starting from the 11th episode of the first season. He praised director Alex von David's adaptation of the series and expressed his trust in von David's interpretation of the show and the characters, stating that he has done an excellent job of adapting the material.

On July 23, 2025, Crunchyroll announced that Le would not reprise his role as Kazuya Kinoshita for season 4 of Rent-A-Girlfriend, later revealing that scheduling conflicts and a studio change were the factor and was replaced by Alex Mai.

On June 30, 2026, Le announced his voice director and co-producer debut for the indie video game Cresata as well as providing the voice of the protagonist, Phaedon.

On October 10, 2026, Le made his directorial debut in the action short film Daredevil: Damned, commemorating the 1st anniversary of his role as Daredevil in the NetEase hero shooter video game Marvel Rivals. He thanked actors Charlie Cox and Vincent D’Onofrio, who originally inspired him to pursue his career and ultimately create the film. Additionally, Le cited that the projects development drew inspiration from what he watched growing up, including Kamen Rider, Teenage Mutant Ninja Turtles, Batman: The Animated Series, Spider-Man, and Super Sentai.

Aside from voice acting, he has also taken on several modeling jobs promoting titles he has previously voiced for.

== Filmography ==
=== Voice acting ===
==== Anime ====
List of voice performances in anime
Year	Title	Role	Notes	Source
2019	Record of Grancrest War	Alexis Doucet		
2019–2020	JoJo's Bizarre Adventure: Golden Wind	Mario Zucchero		
2019–2020	Sword Art Online: Alicization	Lilpilin, Renly's Best Friend		
2019–2024	Demon Slayer: Kimetsu no Yaiba	Zenitsu Agatsuma		
2019–present	The Rising of the Shield Hero	Ake		
2019–present	Welcome to Demon School! Iruma-kun	Kiriwo Amy		
2020–2021	Higurashi: When They Cry – Gou	Mamoru Akasaka		
2020–2022	Yashahime	Hisui		
2020–2023	Rent-A-Girlfriend	Kazuya Kinoshita	Replaced by Alex Mai (season 4 onwards)	
2020–2024	The Misfit of Demon King Academy	Anos Voldigoad		
2020–present	Dorohedoro	Caiman		
2021	Kuroko's Basketball	Seijuro Akashi		
2021	Number24	Yuu Mashiro		
2021	Battle Game in 5 Seconds	Oji Hoshino		
2021	Godzilla Singular Point	Suzuki		
2021	Vinland Saga	Thorfinn	Netflix dub	
2021–2022	Shaman King	John Denbat, Nichrom, Midori Tamurazaki		
2021–present	Tokyo Revengers	Manjirō "Mikey" Sano		
2022	86	Shinei Nouzen	Replaces Billy Kametz (episode 22 onwards)	
2022	Odd Taxi	Hajime Tanaka		
2022	Amaim Warrior at the Borderline	Takeru Konno		
2022	Spy × Family	Passerby	Season 1, episode 9: "Show Off How In Love You Are"	
2022	Lycoris Recoil	Robota		
2022-2026	Bleach: Thousand-Year Blood War	Jūshirō Ukitake, Shinji Hirako, Ryūnosuke Yuki		
2023–2024	Mashle: Magic and Muscles	Mash Burnedead		
2024-present	Undead Unluck	Shen		
2024	Four Knights of the Apocalypse	Lancelot		
2024–2025	Go! Go! Loser Ranger!	Jim Himura		
2024–2025	Tower of God	Ja Wangnan	Starting from season 2	
2024–present	Solo Leveling	Sung Jin-woo		
2024–present	Dandadan	Jin "Jiji" Enjoji		
2025–present	Sakamoto Days	Yoichi Nagumo		
2026–present	Jujutsu Kaisen	Ryu Ishigori, Kurourushi	Starting from season 3	
2026–present	Though I Am an Inept Villainess	Shin-u		

==== Animation ====
List of voice performances in animation
Year	Title	Role	Notes	Source
2019–2021	Power Players	Luka		
2020	Scissor Seven	Da Fei, Stupid Bark, School Kids, Courier, Wedding Guests, Passerby		
2020	Stillwater	Contestant 1, Grandson		
2020–2021	Zuzubaland	Sundae		
2022	Samurai Rabbit: The Usagi Chronicles	Newbotto, Keisatsukan #3, Mogura Mole, Person #1		
2022	Gudetama: An Eggcellent Adventure	Egg Sandwich		
2023	Star Wars: The Bad Batch	Drake, Miner #2	Season 2, episode 10: "Retrieval"	
2024	DC Heroes United	Batman	Season 1, episode 1: "Dawn of Heroes"	
2024	Secret Level	Swordsman, Yi Xing		
2025–present	Your Friendly Neighborhood Spider-Man	Amadeus Cho		
2025–present	Splinter Cell: Deathwatch	Charlie Shetland		
2026	Pretty Pretty Please I Don't Want to Be a Magical Girl	Eclipse		

==== Films ====
List of voice and dubbing performances in films
Year	Title	Role	Notes	Source
2018	The Laws of the Universe: Part 1	Dahar		
2018	Funan	Hout		
2019	Demon Slayer: Kimetsu no Yaiba – Sibling's Bond	Zenitsu Agatsuma	Compilation film	
2019	The Legend of Hei	Wuxian "Infinity"		
2019	Ne Zha	Ao Bing		
2020	Demon Slayer: Kimetsu no Yaiba – The Movie: Mugen Train	Zenitsu Agatsuma		
2021	New Gods: Nezha Reborn	Ao Bing		
2021	Moonbound	Peter		
2022	Dragon Ball Super: Super Hero	Gamma 1		
2022	The Seven Deadly Sins: Grudge of Edinburgh Part 1	Lancelot		
2022	The First Slam Dunk	Kaede Rukawa		
2023	Demon Slayer: Kimetsu no Yaiba – To the Swordsmith Village	Zenitsu Agatsuma	Compilation film	
2023	The Seven Deadly Sins: Grudge of Edinburgh Part 2	Lancelot		
2024	Demon Slayer: Kimetsu no Yaiba – To the Hashira Training	Zenitsu Agatsuma	Compilation film	
2024	Solo Leveling: ReAwakening	Sung Jin-woo	Compilation film	
2025	Ne Zha 2	Ao Bing		
2025	Dandadan: Evil Eye	Jin "Jiji" Enjoji / Evil Eye	Compilation film	
2025	Demon Slayer: Kimetsu no Yaiba – The Movie: Infinity Castle	Zenitsu Agatsuma		
2025	Bâan: The Boundary of Adulthood	Daichi Arai	Short film	
2025	The Legend of Hei II	Wuxian		

==== ONAs ====
List of voice performances in original net animation
Year	Title	Role	Notes	Source
2020	Cagaster of an Insect Cage	Kido		
2020	Beyblade Burst Rise	Joe Lazure, Boy		
2020	Japan Sinks: 2020	Kite		
2021	High-Rise Invasion	Rider Mask		
2021	Record of Ragnarok	Liu Bei, Cain	Episodes 1 through 8	
2021	Resident Evil: Infinite Darkness	Jun See		
2021	Pokémon Evolutions	Leon, Victor, Stagehand		
2022	Kakegurui Twin	Aoi Mibuomi		
2022	Cyberpunk: Edgerunners	Katsuo Tanaka		
2022	Romantic Killer	Junta Hayami		

==== OVAs ====
List of voice performances in original video animation
Year	Title	Role	Notes	Source
2019	Thus Spoke Rohan Kishibe	Yoma Hashimoto		

==== Video games ====
List of voice performances in video games
Year	Title	Role	Notes	Source
2010	Heroes of Newerth	Punk Rampage, Leviathan Geomancer		
2013	Warframe	Packet		
2014	Smite	Warp Tech Janus		
2016	Dragon Ball Xenoverse 2	Gamma 1		
2018	Five Nights at Freddy's: Ultimate Custom Night	Nightmarionne		
2018	RAID: Shadow Legends	Michelangelo		
2019	Wargroove	Ryota		
2019	Mr Love: Queen's Choice	Shaw		
2019	Five Nights at Freddy's: Help Wanted	Nightmarionne		
2019	Pokémon Masters EX	Brendan, Piers		
2019	Astral Chain	Akira Howard (male)		
2020	Shing!	Tetsuo		
2020	Fire Emblem Heroes	Jorge		
2020	Doom Eternal	Sentinel Guards, Military Officers		
2020	Final Fantasy VII Remake	Sonon Kusakabe		
2020	Guardian Tales	Male Knight, Fei		
2020	Marvel's Avengers	Jimmy Woo		
2021	Cookie Run: Kingdom	Devil Cookie		
2021	Re:Zero − Starting Life in Another World: The Prophecy of the Throne	Tiga Rauleon		
2021	Monster Hunter Rise	Hunter		
2021	Phantasy Star Online 2: New Genesis	Tuuli		
2021	Final Fantasy VII Remake Intergrade	Sonon Kusakabe		
2021	Nier Reincarnation	Yuzuki Kurezome		
2021	Shadowverse: Champion's Battle	Rei Saotome		
2021	Lost Judgment	Shinya Kawai		
2021	Call of Duty: Vanguard	Shigenori Ota		
2021	Demon Slayer: Kimetsu no Yaiba – The Hinokami Chronicles	Zenitsu Agatsuma		
2021	Guilty Gear Strive	Anji Mito	Under the pseudonym "Kae Min"	
2021	Street Fighter V	Luke Sullivan		
2022	Relayer	Additional Voices		
2022	My Little Pony: A Maretime Bay Adventure	Narrator, Paint Shop 1, Shopkeeper		
2022	Saints Row	Santo Ileso Pedestrians		
2022	Star Ocean: The Divine Force	Additional Voices		
2022	River City Girls 2	Saotome		
2023	Octopath Traveler II	Additional Voices		
2023	Cassette Beasts	Eugene		
2023	System Shock	Cyborg Drone, Jon David Wong, Lars Westergren, Michael Pelletier, PC Efforts / Emotes, Travis Baerga		
2023	Street Fighter 6	Luke Sullivan		
2023	Master Detective Archives: Rain Code	Vivia Twilight		
2023	Tower of God: New World	Lero Ro		
2023	Eternights	Yohan		
2024	Like a Dragon: Infinite Wealth	Eiji Mitamura		
2024	Persona 3 Reload	Makoto Yuki, Pharos, Ryoji Mochizuki, Nyx, Orpheus		
2024	Final Fantasy VII Rebirth	Sonon Kusakabe		
2024	Demon Slayer: Kimetsu no Yaiba - Sweep the Board	Zenitsu Agatsuma		
2024	Solo Leveling: Arise	Sung Jin-woo		
2024	Zenless Zone Zero	Lighter		
2024	Dragon Ball: Sparking! Zero	Gamma 1		
2024	A Quiet Place: The Road Ahead	Martin		
2024	Card-en-Ciel	Neon		
2024	Romancing SaGa 2: Revenge of the Seven	Gerard		
2024	Slitterhead	Edo		
2025	Dynasty Warriors: Origins	Xu Shu		
2025	Bleach Rebirth of Souls	Shinji Hirako, Jushiro Ukitake, Sora Inoue		
2025	ENA: Dream BBQ	ENA, Salesperson		
2025	Rune Factory: Guardians of Azuma	Takumi		
2025	Shinobi: Art of Vengeance	Enemy Characters		
2025	Demon Slayer: Kimetsu no Yaiba – The Hinokami Chronicles 2	Zenitsu Agatsuma		
2025	Date Everything!	xxXShadowl0rd420Xxx		
2025	Towa and the Guardians of the Sacred Tree	Shigin, Ro		
2025	Marvel Rivals	Matt Murdock / Daredevil		
2025	Destiny 2: Renegades	Dredgen Bael		
2026	Screamer	Hiroshi Jackson		
2026	Invincible VS	Mark Grayson / Invincible		
2026	Fortnite Battle Royale	Cluster		
2026	Arknights: Endfield	Camille		
2026	Cresata	Phaedon	voice director and co-producer	
2026	Fire Emblem: Fortune's Weave	Majide		
2026	Fatal Fury: City of the Wolves	Manjiro Sano		
2026	Rev. NOiR	Asch		(Note: https://x.com/AleksLeVO/status/2098498082212393157)
2026	Grand Theft Auto VI	Additional Voices		

== Awards ==
Year	Award	Category	Work/Recipient	Result	Source
2025	5th Astra TV Awards	Best Lead Voice-Over Performance	Sung Jin-woo (Solo Leveling: Arise from the Shadow)	Won	
2025	9th Crunchyroll Anime Awards	Best Voice Artist Performance (English)	Sung Jin-woo (Solo Leveling)	Won	
