= Sung Jin-woo =

Main protagonist of Solo Leveling

- Solo Leveling character
- Cover art for the first home media volume of the season 2 of Solo Leveling, featuring protagonist Sung Jin-woo
- First appearance: Solo Leveling web novel : Chapter 1
- Portrayed by: Byeon Woo-seok
- Voiced by: Taito Ban (Japanese); Aleks Le (English); Azul Flor (German)

In-universe information
- Gender: Male
- Occupation: South Korean hunter
- Relatives: Cha Hae-in (wife)

Sung Jin-woo (Korean: 성진우) is the protagonist of the Solo Leveling web novel and anime series created by Chugong. He first appeared in the web novel's first volume.

Originally the weakest E-Rank South Korean Hunter, he gets the chance of a lifetime when he is selected as a Player by Mysterious System. Taking advantage of his new power, Jin-woo rises up to become far stronger than the National Level Hunters. Eventually, he learns that he became a Player because the Shadow Monarch Ashborn chose to train him as a successor to fight in the war between the Rulers and the Monarchs. He ultimately marries the S-Rank Hunter Cha Hae-in in the series and has a son, Suho, who inherits some of his powers. In the sequel series Ragnarok, Jin-woo leaves Earth to join forces with the Rulers in a new war against the Itarim, beings who seek to take over the universe, but not before sealing Suho's memories and powers so he can live a normal life. When the Itarim's invasions eventually reach Earth, he tasks Beru to unseal Suho's memories and powers and train him to defend Earth from the new war.

Sung Jin-woo is voiced by Taito Ban (in Japanese) and Aleks Le (in English) in the anime adaptations by A-1 Pictures. At the 9th Crunchyroll Anime Awards in 2025, Sung Jin-woo won "Best Main Character". He is going to be featured in the upcoming movie Solo Leveling: Beyond the System.

== Casting ==
Initially starting as a web novel by original creator Chugong in 2016, Solo Leveling gradually adapted into webtoon by 2018 on KakaoPage, with illustration by Jang Sung-rak (aka Dubu), the CEO of Redice Studio, who died on July 23, 2022, after suffering from a cerebral hemorrhage. Jinwoo's appearance is so credited to the illustrator, Jang Sung-rak (aka Dubu).

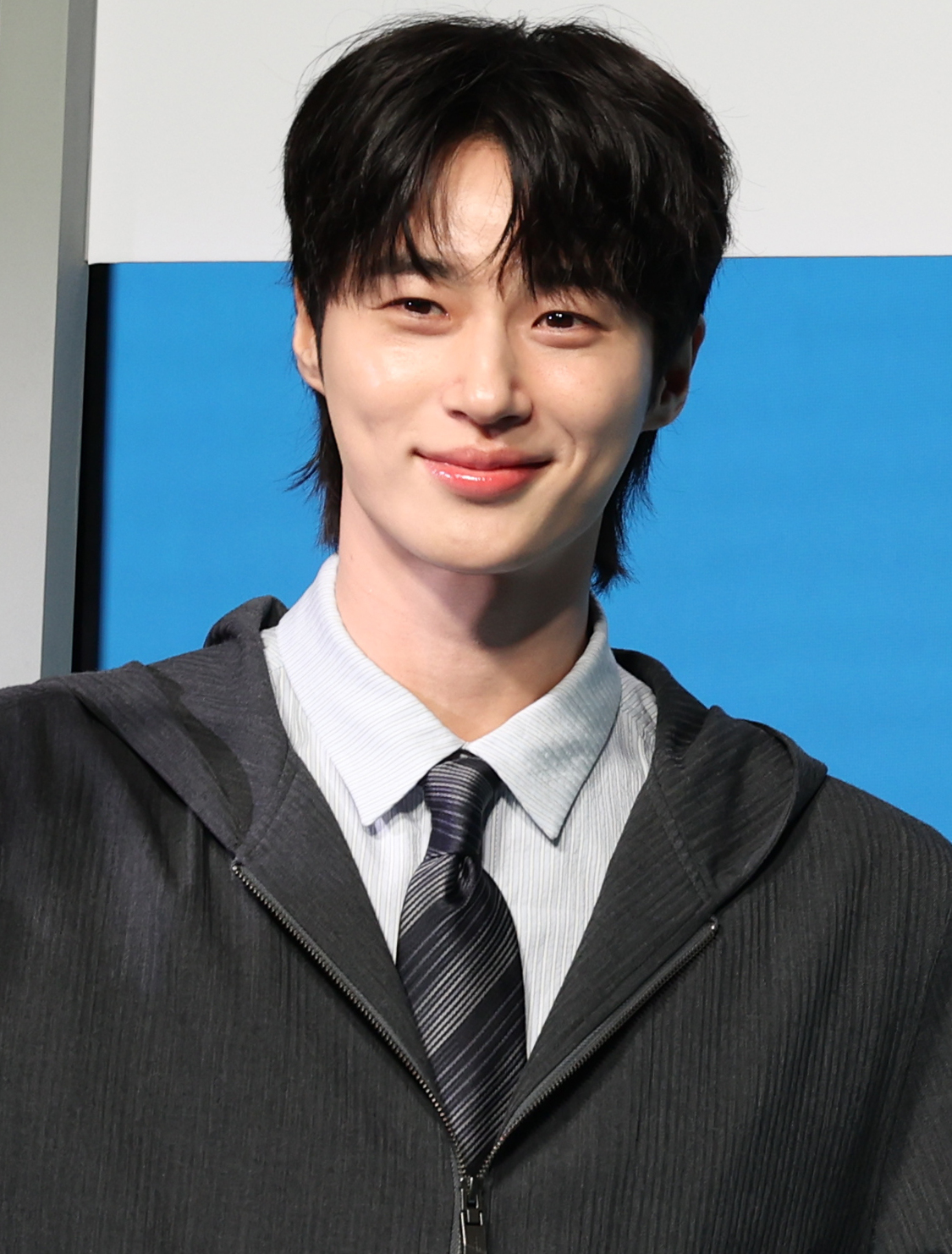
Byeon Woo-seok, featuring as Sung Jin-woo in the upcoming live-action adaptation by Netflix

In 2025, Netflix announced a live-action adaptation of Solo Leveling with Byeon Woo-seok featuring as protagonist Sung Jin-woo.

== Reception ==
As the series begin Jin-woo was shown as the weakest hunter, but following major incidents in the Double Dungeon, he gain mysterious powers and continues to grow with number of battles and enemies to the man challenging global threats. Fans have praised the intense, fast-paced fights with his enemies, and his provoking dialogues, which fans describe as "aura farming". Due to this critical reception, Solo Leveling won "Anime of the Year", "Best Action", and "Best New Series" title while Jin-woo won "Best Main Character and the international voice actors portraying the character including Aleks Le were awarded "Best Voice Artist Performance" in three different languages at the 9th Crunchyroll Anime Awards. In 2026, the series became the most rated anime and subsequently, first-ever anime to reach 1 million ratings on Crunchyroll platform with its two seasons. In 2025, Sony confirmed that Solo Leveling is now the most watched anime on Crunchyroll ever upto March 2025.
