= Solo Leveling =

South Korean web novel series by Chugong

- First webtoon adaptation volume cover, featuring Sung Jin-woo
- Author: Chugong
- Country: South Korea
- Language: Korean
- Genre: Action, Fantasy, Cosmic horror
- Publisher: D&C Media (Korean); Webnovel (English); Yen Press (English)
- Published: July 25, 2016 – March 13, 2018 (KakaoPage); November 4, 2016 – April 18, 2018 (D&C Media); December 21, 2018 – June 24, 2019 (Webnovel); December 29, 2021 (Final chapter)
- Media type: Web novel
- No. of books: 14

Solo Leveling
- Author: Chugong
- Illustrator: Dubu (Redice Studio)
- Publisher: D&C Media
- Webtoon service: KakaoPage (South Korea); Piccoma (Japan); Tapas (English); Pocket Comics (English); Webnovel (English); Tappytoon (English); Yen Press (English)
- Original run: March 4, 2018 – December 29, 2021
- Volumes: 15
- Anime television series
- Directed by: Shunsuke Nakashige
- Written by: Noboru Kimura
- Music by: Hiroyuki Sawano
- Studio: A-1 Pictures
- Licensed by: Aniplex; Crunchyroll (streaming); SEA: Medialink
- Original network: Tokyo MX, GYT, Gunma TV, BS11, CBC, ytv
- Original run: January 7, 2024 – March 30, 2025
- Episodes: 25
- Anime film

Solo Leveling: Beyond the System
- Directed by: Tao Tajima
- Music by: Hiroyuki Sawano
- Studio: A-1 Pictures

Solo Leveling

Korean name
- Hangul: 나 혼자만 레벨업
Transcriptions
- Revised Romanization: Na honjaman rebereop
- McCune–Reischauer: Na honjaman reberŏp

Japanese name
- Kanji: 俺だけレベルアップな件
- Kana: おれだけレベルアップなけん
Transcriptions
- Romanization: Ore dake Reberuappu na Ken

Solo Leveling, also alternatively translated as Only I Level Up (Korean: 나 혼자만 레벨업; RR: Na Honjaman Rebereop) is a South Korean fantasy web novel written by Chugong. It was serialized in Kakao's digital comic and fiction platform KakaoPage beginning on July 25, 2016, and was later published by D&C Media under their Papyrus label since November 4, 2016. The novel has been licensed in English by Yen Press.

A webtoon adaptation of Solo Leveling was first serialized in KakaoPage on March 4, 2018; it was illustrated by Jang Sung-rak (Dubu) and the webtoon's first season concluded on March 19, 2020, followed by its second season, which was released from August 2020 to December 2021. The webtoon has been licensed in English by Yen Press. Its individual chapters have been collected and published in 15 volumes by D&C Media, as of October 2025.

An anime television series adaptation produced by A-1 Pictures aired from January to March 2024. A second season, subtitled Arise from the Shadow, aired from January to March 2025. A sequel anime film, subtitled Beyond the System, has been announced.

A Korean drama adaptation is currently in development, with actor Byeon Woo-seok playing the role of Sung Jin-woo, and Han So-hee as Cha Hae-in. Additionally, a spin-off webtoon Solo Leveling: Ragnarok premiered in July 2024. A role-playing video game titled Solo Leveling: Arise has been released by Netmarble.

== Plot ==
In a world where hunters, human warriors who possess supernatural abilities, battle deadly monsters to protect all mankind from certain annihilation, a notoriously weak E ranked hunter named Sung Jin-woo finds himself in a seemingly endless struggle for survival. One day, after narrowly surviving an overwhelmingly powerful and rare double dungeon that nearly wipes out his entire party, a mysterious program called The System chooses him as its sole player and in turn, gives him the unique ability to level up in strength which is something no other hunter is able to do, as a hunter's abilities are set and don't "level up" once they awaken. Jin-woo then sets out on a journey as he fights against all kinds of enemies, both man and monster, to discover the secrets of the dungeons and the true source of his powers. He soon discovers that he has been chosen to inherit the position of Shadow Monarch, essentially turning him into an immortal necromancer known as the "King of the Dead" who has absolute rule over the dead, created by a god while in the middle of the war between its two creations of light and dark, the Rulers and the Monarch. He is the only Monarch who fights to save humanity, as the other Monarchs, who are actually the leaders of all monsters, are trying to kill him and wipe out the humans.

== Characters ==
=== Sung Family ===
Sung Jin-woo
Voiced by: Taito Ban (Japanese); Aleks Le (English)
Portrayed by: Byeon Woo-seok
Japanese name: Shun Mizushino (水篠 旬, Mizushino Shun)
Sung Jin-woo (성진우; Seong Jinu) is the protagonist of the series. Originally known as the weakest E-Rank South Korean Hunter, he gets the chance of a lifetime when he is selected as a Player by Mysterious System. Taking advantage of his new power, Jin-woo rises up to become far stronger than the National Level Hunters. Eventually, he learns that he became a Player because the Shadow Monarch Ashborn chose to train him as a successor to fight in the war between the Rulers and the Monarchs. He ultimately marries the S-Rank Hunter Cha Hae-in and has a son, Suho, who inherits some of his powers.

In the sequel series Ragnarok, Jin-woo leaves Earth to join forces with the Rulers in a new war against the Itarim, beings who seek to take over the universe, but not before sealing Suho's memories and powers so he can live a normal life. When the Itarim's invasions eventually reach Earth, he tasks Beru to unseal Suho's memories and powers and train him to defend Earth from the new war.

Sung Jin-ah
Voiced by: Haruna Mikawa (Japanese); Rebecca Wang (English)
Japanese name: Aoi Mizushino (水篠 葵, Mizushino Aoi)
Sung Jinah (성진아; Seong Jina) is Jin-woo's younger sister. Unlike her brother, she is a civilian and normal student in high school.

Park Kyung-hye
Voiced by: Yuri Amano (Japanese); Colleen Clinkenbeard (English)
Japanese name: Satoko Mizushino (水篠 聡子, Mizushino Satoko)
Park Kyung-hye (박경혜; Bak Gyeonghye) is Jin-woo and Jin-ah's mother. Four years before the events of the main storyline, she suddenly became ill with Eternal Slumber, an incurable and magically induced sleeping disorder, forcing Jin-woo to take over as the breadwinner of the family. Jin-woo is able to cure her condition using a rare potion he crafts while training with the System.

Sung Il-hwan
Voiced by: Rikiya Koyama (Japanese); Robert McCollum (English)
Japanese name: Junichiro Mizushino (水篠 潤一郎(ジュンイチロー), Mizushino Jun'ichirō)
Sung Il-hwan (성일환; Seong Ilhwan) is a Korean S-Rank Hunter, Kyung-hye's husband, and Jin-woo and Jin-ah's father. Ten years before the events of the main storyline, he suddenly disappeared inside a dungeon and was presumed dead. He later returns to the human world to aid his son in the coming war against the Monarchs and is eventually revealed to be a Rulers' vessel, one of the seven humans chosen by the Rulers to serve as their hosts. Although Il-Hwan ultimately succeeds in his mission, he ends up exerting far more power than his body can handle and consequently dies in his son's arms. He is revived by Jin-woo when he uses the cup of reincarnation to create a new timeline. With his Ruler's authority, he is able to retain his previous memories from the previous timeline. However, he requests the Rulers erase his memories so he will not be a burden to Jin-woo and lives as a simple husband and father for his family. Il-Hwan also recognized as one of the strongest hunter in the world.

Yoo Jin-ho
Voiced by: Genta Nakamura (Japanese); Justin Briner (English)
Japanese name: Kenta Morobishi (諸菱 賢太, Morobishi Kenta)
Yoo Jin-ho (유진호; Yu Jinho), a D-Rank Hunter, is Jin-woo's sworn brother and a righteous man. He hails from a wealthy family and eventually becomes the vice-chairman of Jin-woo's guild after he impresses Jin-woo with his loyalty and commitment. Jin-ho is estranged from his biological brother and tends to dress up in fancy and expensive armor, which serves as a running gag throughout the series. He has a crush on Jin-woo's sister Jin-ah and eventually marries her in the revised timeline epilogue. Becoming Jin-woo's younger brother-in-law.

Cha Hae-in
Voiced by: Reina Ueda (Japanese); Michelle Rojas (English)
Portrayed by: Han So-hee
Japanese name: Shizuku Kousaka (向坂 雫, Kōsaka Shizuku)
Cha Hae-in (차해인; Cha Haein) is a Korean S-Rank Hunter who specializes in swordsmanship. She is the only female S-Rank in the country. She has a rare condition that causes other Hunters to smell foul to her. She eventually develops romantic feelings for Jin-woo after being saved by him three times, and also because he is the only Hunter who smells nice. Initially, Jin-woo does not reciprocate her feelings, but he eventually falls in love with her as well. Jin-woo marries her in the revised timeline and they have a son, Suho. In the sequel series Ragnarok, she mysteriously disappears at the same time Jin-woo departs to fight the Itarim, leading to Suho's quest to search for her.

Sung Suho
Sung Suho (성수호; Seong Suho) is the 16-year old son (21 in Ragnarok) of Sung Jin-woo and Cha Hae-in and the protagonist of the sequel series Solo Leveling: Ragnarok. He inherited some of his father's powers, but Jin-woo sealed them in hopes that Suho could live a normal life. When the Itarim's invasion reaches Earth, his memories and powers are unsealed by Beru and he is given the same System his father used to level up. He goes on a quest to defend Earth from the Itarim and search for his missing parents.

=== Shadow Army ===
An immortal race of soldiers resurrected by the power of the Shadow Monarch. Unlike summons from other hunters, they are capable of growth and speech. There are multiple grades of shadow soldiers, including basic grade, normal grade, elite grade, knight grade, elite knight grade, commander/general grade, marshal/commander grade, and Grand Marshal grade. Only soldiers of commander/general grade can speak.

Ashborn
Ashborn (아스본) is the King of the Dead and the Monarch of Shadows. He is also the strongest Ruler and the Greatest Fragment of Brilliant Light. After spending eons fighting in the ancient war between the Rulers and the Monarchs, Ashborn grew weary of the ceaseless violence, leading him to eventually choose Jin-woo as his host in hopes of ending the bloodshed once and for all. When Jin-woo is later killed by the Monarchs, Ashborn appears in the flesh to save him and gives Jin-woo a detailed explanation of his past. After transferring the rest of his powers to Jin-woo and bringing him back to life, Ashborn goes into eternal sleep and allows Jin-woo to take his place as the Shadow Monarch.

Igris
Igris, the Blood-Red Commander, is a high-ranking knight with exceptional swordsmanship and loyalty, holding the position of marshal that rivals Beru but is overshadowed by Bellion. He kneels before his master after battles. Igris dislikes Iron's foolish behavior in battle. Despite being a battle lover, Igris values education and argues with Bellion about Suho's schooling. He is also one of the most powerful knights. Igris once served the Shadow Monarch Ashborn during his war with the Rulers eons ago. After Ashborn decided to retire and find a human successor, he tasked Igris with testing his successor in battle when the time was right.

Beru
Voiced by: Akira Ishida (Japanese); Jason Liebrecht (English)
Beru is an ant shadow that was extracted from the Ant King, a powerful S-Rank beast that killed Goto Ryuji and incapacitated Cha Hae-in before Jin-woo managed to kill it. Beru is one of the most powerful shadows, holding the position of General. He later becomes a Marshal that rivals Igris but is overshadowed by Bellion. He also has a fond streak for Jin-woo's son, Suho.

Kargalgan/Fang (Tusk)
Voiced by: Kenta Miyake (Japanese); J Balvin (English)
A high orc shaman shadow, he is the boss of an A-Rank dungeon. As he nearly the defeated the Hunter Guild's strike team, he is also the first one to realize that Jin-woo is a Monarch. As an Elite Knight Grade shadow, his power is the same level of an S-Rank Hunter.

Kim Chul/Iron
Voiced by: Chikahiro Kobayashi (Japanese); Patrick Seitz (English)
Japanese name: Yuuma Uehara (上原 悠真, Uehara Yuuma)
Iron is the shadow of Kim Chul (김철; Gim Cheol). During Jin-woo's fight with Baruka, a crazed Kim Chul attempts to kill Jin-woo, only to be killed by Igris. Knowing that he would have a hard time defeating Baruka with only Igris' help, Jin-woo quickly extracts Kim Chul's shadow from his corpse and named him Iron. He is known for being an idiotic shadow. He copies Igris' habit of bringing a head to Jin-woo, much to the knight's annoyance.

Hwang Dong-soo/Greed
Voiced by: Junichi Suwabe (Japanese); Matthew David Rudd (English)
Japanese name: Masato Ukyo (右京 将人, Ukyo Masato)
Hwang Dong-soo (황동수; Hwang Dongsu) is a Korean S-Rank Hunter based in America who attempts to kill Jin-woo after learning that the latter was responsible for the death of his older brother Dong-suk. He is eventually killed by Jin-woo after abducting and torturing Jin-ho for information about his brother's murder. Following his death, he becomes one of Jin-woo's shadow soldiers, nicknamed "Greed".

Tank
Tank is the shadow of an ice bear that Jin-woo encounters during the Red Gate Incident. As a Knight Grade Shadow, Tank is about as powerful as an A-Rank Hunter. He is also strong enough to plow his way through a horde of demons like they were bowling pins and kill a Naga in one hit.

Kaisel
Kaisel is the shadow of Kaisellin, a wyvern that Baran used as his battle mount. After Jin-woo kills Baran, he extracts the shadow from Kaisellin's corpse and names it Kaisel, as he did not remember the wyvern's original name. Due to the fact that Kaisel is only good for flying and not fighting, Jin-woo only summons the wyvern when he needs to travel somewhere by air and cannot use Shadow Exchange.

Bellion
Bellion is a servant of Ashborn and the strongest shadow in existence, holding the position of Grand Marshal. Bellion was born eons ago from the fruit of the World Tree, a mystical tree so large that it could blanket the entire sky with its branches alone. Following this, he became Ashborn's lieutenant, a position that he retained after his death, and was the first shadow soldier to ever be created from Ashborn's power.

=== Hunters ===
==== National Level Hunters ====
Thomas Andre
Thomas Andre (토마스 안드레) is one of the strongest hunters in America and one of the five National Level Hunters, ranking 1st in the world. He is also a Rulers' vessel and is nicknamed the Goliath due to his large build and immense superhuman strength. He later befriends Jin-woo after the latter defeats him in a fight and gives him Kamish's Wrath, the strongest magical weapon in the world, as a gift.
Liu Zhigang
Voiced by: Tomokazu Seki (Japanese); Yong Yea (English)
Liu Zhigang (류즈캉) is the strongest hunter in China and one of the five National Level Hunters, ranking 2nd in the world. He is also a Rulers' vessel and is the strongest hunter in Asia until Jin-woo surpasses him in power. He later becomes on good terms with Jin-woo when they meet each other for the first time during the annual guild conference.
Christopher Reed
Christopher Reed (크리스토퍼 리드) is one of the strongest hunters in America and one of the five National Level Hunters, ranking 3rd in the world. He is also a Rulers' vessel and the first of the seven to be killed by the Monarchs.
Siddharth Bachchan
Siddharth Bachchan (싯다르트 밧찬) is the strongest hunter in India and one of the five National Level Hunters, ranking 4th in the world. He is also a Rulers' vessel and the only one of the seven to never make a physical appearance in the webtoon.

==== S-Rank Hunters ====
Go Gun-hee
Voiced by: Banjō Ginga (Japanese); Kent Williams (English)
Japanese name: Kyoomi Gotou (後藤 清臣, Gotō Kyoomi)
Go Gun-hee (고건희; Go Geonhui) is a Korean S-Rank Hunter and the Chairman of the Korean Hunters Association, the government agency responsible for overseeing all the hunters, gates, and guilds active within Korea. Although he is later revealed to be a Rulers' vessel, he suffers from a variety of health problems due to his old age, preventing him from using his powers to their maximum output. He is ultimately killed by the Monarchs in battle.
Baek Yoon-ho
Voiced by: Hiroki Tōchi (Japanese); Christopher Sabat (English)
Japanese name: Taiga Shirakawa (白川 大虎, Shirakawa Taiga)
Baek Yoon-ho (백윤호; Baek Yunho) is a Korean S-Rank Hunter who specializes in transformation magic. He is the Guild Master of the White Tiger Guild. He is also the first S-Rank to discover Jin-woo's ability to grow.
Choi Jong-in
Voiced by: Daisuke Hirakawa (Japanese); Ian Sinclair (English)
Japanese name: Shin Mogami (最上 真, Mogami Shin)
Choi Jong-in (최종인; Choe Jongin) is a Korean S-Rank Hunter who specializes in fire magic. He is the Guild Master of the Hunters Guild.
Lim Tae-gyu
Voiced by: Kohsuke Toriumi (Japanese); Johnny Yong Bosch (English)
Japanese name: Keisuke Kurosu (黒須 圭介, Kurosu Keisuke)
Lim Tae-gyu (림태규; Rim Taegyu) is a Korean S-Rank Hunter who specializes in archery magic. He is the Guild Master of the Fiend Guild.
Ma Dong-wook
Voiced by: Akio Otsuka (Japanese); Brent Mukai (English)
Japanese name: Dougen Machida (町田 堂玄, Machida Dougen)
Ma Dong-wook (마동욱; Ma Donguk) is a tank class Korean S-Rank Hunter who specializes in gigantification. He is the Guild Master of the Fame Guild.
Min Byung-gyu
Voiced by: Junya Enoki (Japanese); Lee George (English)
Japanese name: Goh Minobe (美濃部 剛, Minobe Gou)
Min Byung-gyu (민병규; Min Byeonggyu) is a Korean S-Rank Hunter who specializes in healing magic. He is an old friend of Baek and dies during the 4th Jeju Island Raid.
Lee Eunseok
Voiced by: Takuma Terashima (Japanese); Ryan Colt Levy (English)
Japanese name: Fuuki (颯樹)
Lee Eunseok (이은석; I Eunseok) is a Korean S-Rank Hunter who specializes in lightning magic. He is an old friend of Baek and Min and dies during the 3rd Jeju Island Raid.
Goto Ryuji
Voiced by: Satoshi Mikami (Japanese); Christopher Wehkamp (English)
Goto Ryuji (ゴトウ リョウジ) is the strongest hunter in Japan. Despite not being strong compared to the National Level Hunters, Goto is egotistical and has a callous disregard for human life. His hubris ultimately costs him his life when he is killed in one hit by the Ant King during the 4th Jeju Island Raid.
Sugimoto Reiji
Voiced by: Yūya Uchida (Japanese); Brandon McInnis (English)
Sugimoto Reiji (スギモト レイジ) is a Japanese S-Rank Hunter and the vice-guild master before succeeding Goto.
Tawata Kanae
Voiced by: Yui Ishikawa (Japanese); Elizabeth Maxwell (English)
Tawata Kanae (タワタ カナエ) is a powerful and cool-headed Japanese S-Rank Hunter and one of the only hunters not to encounter the Ant King.
Kumamoto Atsushi
Voiced by: Yoshitsugu Matsuoka (Japanese); Todd Haberkorn (English)
Kumamoto Atsushi (クマモト アツシ) is a somewhat cowardly Japanese S-Rank Hunter who goes into a berserker state that greatly enhances his physical capabilities if he is injured.
Hoshino Minoru
Voiced by: Jun Kasama (Japanese); Alejandro Saab (English)
Hoshino Minoru (ホシノ ミノル) is a Japanese S-Rank Hunter and the only one to survive meeting the Ant King, thanks to Goto.
Shimizu Akari
Voiced by: Nene Hieda (Japanese); Suzie Yeung (English)
Shimizu Akari (シミズ アカリ) is a Japanese S-Rank Healer and the first victim of the Ant King.
Tanaka Kenzo
Voiced by: Tomoaki Maeno (Japanese); Clifford Chapin (English)
Tanaka Kenzo (タナカ ケンゾ) is a Japanese S-Rank Hunter and a brawler.
Kei
Voiced by: Tetsuya Kakihara (Japanese); Aaron Dismuke (English)
Kei (ケイ) is a Japanese S-Rank Hunter specializing in ice magic. He has an enhanced sense of smell like Cha.
Fujishima Tatsumi
Voiced by: Chiharu Sawashiro (Japanese); Howard Wang (English)
Fujishima Tatsumi (フジシマ タツミ) is a Japanese S-Rank Hunter who wields a sword in battle.
Izawa Ippei
Voiced by: Kento Itō (Japanese); Zeno Robinson (English)
Izawa Ippei (イザワ イッペイ) is a Japanese S-Rank Hunter and Kei's partner in battle.
Ishida Mari
Voiced by: Yūko Natsuyoshi (Japanese); Kristen McGuire (English)
Ishida Mari (イシダ マリ) is a Japanese S-Rank Hunter who is grouped with Goto and Hoshino.
Lennart Niermann
Lennart Niermann (레나트 니어만) is the strongest hunter in Germany, ranking 12th in the world. Despite being the best in his homeland, Lennart is not particularly arrogant and has a strong sense of duty towards the cause, as displayed when he was willing to use himself as bait to save Thomas from getting killed by the Monarchs.

==== Other Hunters ====
Lee Joo-hee
Voiced by: Rina Honnizumi (Japanese); Dani Chambers (English)
Japanese name: Eri Mizuki (観月 絵里, Mizuki Eri)
Lee Joo-hee (이주희; I Juhui) is a Korean B-Rank Hunter who specializes in healing magic. She is one of Jin-woo's friends during his days as an E-Rank Hunter. Although she survives the double dungeon alongside Jin-woo, the incident and others traumatize her to the point that she ultimately retires as a hunter.
Song Chi-yul
Voiced by: Eiji Hanawa (Japanese); Sean Hennigan (English)
Japanese name: Isamu Mabuchi (馬淵 勲, Mabuchi Isamu)
Song Chi-yul (송치열; Song Chiyeol) is a C-Rank Hunter and a kumdo teacher. He is one of Jin-woo's old friends, having known him since he was an E-Rank Hunter, and one of the six survivors of the double dungeon incident.
Kang Tae-shik
Voiced by: Koki Uchiyama (Japanese); Alan Lee (English)
Japanese name: Taisei Michikado (道門 泰星, Michikado Taisei)
Kang Tae-shik (강태식; Gang Taesik) is a B-Rank Hunter who works as an inspector for the Korean Hunters Association's Surveillance Team. He is secretly a hitman for hire and enjoys taking advantage of the lawlessness within gates. He attempts to kill Jin-woo and others to conceal his crimes, but Jin-woo overpowers and kills him.
Woo Jin-chul
Voiced by: Makoto Furukawa (Japanese); SungWon Cho (English)
Japanese name: Akira Inukai (犬飼 晃, Inukai Akira)
Woo Jin-chul (우진철; U Jincheol) is a Korean A-Rank Hunter and the Chairman of the Korean Hunters Association. Prior to the death to Go Gun-hee, the previous Chairman, he was the Chief Inspector of the Korean Hunters' Association's Surveillance Team. He is also the first human to learn about the war between the Monarchs and the Rulers through Jin-woo. In Ragnarok, thanks to his memories being restored unwittingly by Jin-woo, he is able to control the gate opening in the revised timeline. Due to this, he makes preparations for the upcoming war against the Itarim and makes the awakened beings who do criminal acts assigned as "Villains".
Hwang Dong-suk
Voiced by: Yasuhiro Mamiya (Japanese); Jarrod Greene (English)
Japanese name: Hayato Ukyo (右京 隼人, Ukyo Hayato)
Hwang Dong-suk (황동석; Hwang Dongseok) is a tank class Korean C-Rank Hunter and the older brother of S-Rank hunter Dong-soo. He tries to murder Jin-woo and Jin-ho while in a dungeon to avoid paying them their share of the loot. Jin-woo overpowers and kills him.
Han Song-yi
Voiced by: Miyu Tomita (Japanese); Emi Lo (English)
Japanese name: Rin Asahina (朝比奈 りん, Asahina Rin)
Han Song-yi (한송이; Han Songi) is a Korean E-Rank Hunter and close friend of Jin-ah, who gets recruited to "participate" in Jin-woo and Jin-ho's C-Rank raids.
Park Heejin
Voiced by: Ruriko Aoki (Japanese); Trina Nishimura (English)
Japanese name: Satsuki Imamiya (今宮 さつき, Imamiya Satsuki)
Park Heejin (박희진; Bak Huijin) is a Korean B-Rank Hunter of the White Tiger Guild who participates in the Red Gate incident with Jin-woo.
Son Kihoon
Voiced by: Takaaki Torashima (Japanese); Stephen Fu (English)
Japanese name: Fumiaki Hokazono (外園 文章, Hokazono Fumiaki)
Son Kihoon (손기훈; Son Gihun) is a tank class Korean A-Rank Hunter of the Hunters Guild who leads Strike Team B.
Lee Bora
Voiced by: Riria Ito (Japanese); Xanthe Huynh (English)
Japanese name: Yukari Fujisaki (藤崎 ゆかり, Fujisaki Yukari)
Lee Bora (이보라; I Bora) is a Korean A-Rank Hunter of the Hunters Guild and a member of Strike Team B.
Gina
Voiced by: Kotomi Aihara (Japanese); Crystal Lee (English)
Japanese name: Lina (リナ, Rina)
Gina (지나; Jina) is a Korean A-Rank Hunter of the Hunters Guild who specializes in telekinesis. She is a member of Strike Team B.
Han Semi
Voiced by: Sayaka Senbongi (Japanese); Sura Siu (English)
Japanese name: Chiyu Saotome (五月女 千結, Saotome Chiyu)
Han Semi (한세미; Han Semi) is a Korean A-Rank Healer of the Hunters Guild and a member of Strike Team B.
Seo Ji-woo
Voiced by: Mayuko Kazama (Japanese); Emily Sun (English)
Japanese name: Hibiki Hayate (早手 響, Hayate Hibiki)
Seo Ji-woo (서지우; Seo Jiu) is a Korean A-Rank Hunter of the Hunters Guild and a member of Strike Team B. In the sequel series, she reawakens as an S-Rank stronger than even Ma and establishes her own guild, while also helping out Suho.
Lee Min-sung
Voiced by: Gen Satō (Japanese); Ricco Fajardo (English)
Japanese name: Minoru Tomoya (友谷 稔, Tomoya Minoru)
Lee Min-sung (이민성; I Minseong) is an egocentric world-famous Korean actor who awakens as an A-Rank Hunter and joins the Reapers Guild.
Park Jong-soo
Voiced by: Kazuyuki Okitsu (Japanese); David Matranga (English)
Japanese name: Shusuke Bando (坂東 修輔, Bando Shusuke)
Park Jong-soo (박종수; Bak Jongsu) is a tank class Korean A-Rank Hunter and the Guild Master of the Knights Guild.

=== Monarchs ===
The Monarchs (군주; Gunju) are an ancient race of overlords created by the Absolute Being who seek to wipe out the human race for their own ends, making them the primary antagonists of the series. As a result, they have a cruel disregard for life and are generally very arrogant towards those they find inferior to themselves, especially humans, as their strength are much more powerful that a single Monarch can easily obliterate a group of S-Rank Hunters or even National Level Hunters. The Monarchs also each govern a different race of monsters and take after the race that they rule over in appearance, they are spiritual beings who possessed humans like the Ruler's vessel, only completely become their own identity.

==== The Original Monarchs ====
Antares
Antares (안타레스) is the King of Dragons and the Monarch of Destruction and the strongest Monarch. He is also the leader of the Monarchs which makes him the final antagonist of Solo Leveling. After Jinwoo killed three of the other Monarchs, Antares invaded the human world in order to draw him out and finish him off. However, despite his best efforts, he ultimately failed to achieve his ambitions and was killed by the Rulers. He is eventually defeated by Jinwoo once again in the revised timeline, and his title is soon to be succeeded by his son Suho.
Baran
Baran (바란) is the King of Demons and the White Flame Monarch. He is the first Monarch Jinwoo faces and defeats in battle in the Demon Castle.
Rakan
Voiced by: Hiroshi Shirokuma (Japanese); Ray Chase (English)
Rakan (라칸) is the King of Beasts and the Fang Monarch, who begins investigating Jinwoo along with Sillad, after his success on Jeju Island.
Sillad
Voiced by: Mitsuru Miyamoto (Japanese); Bruce DuBose (English)
Sillad (실라드) is the King of Snow Folk and the Frost Monarch, who begins investigating Jinwoo along with Rakan, after his success on Jeju Island.
Tarnak
Tarnak (타르나크) is the King of Monstrous Humanoids and the Monarch of the Iron Body, who teams up with Rakan and Querehsha during the Japan Crisis.
Legia
Legia (레기아) is the King of Giants and the Monarch of the Beginning, who was the Hidden Boss of the Tokyo S-Rank Gate.
Querehsha
Querehsha (퀘레샤) is the Queen of Insects and the Monarch of Plagues, who teams up with Rakan and Tarnak during the Japan Crisis.
Yogumunt
Yogumunt (요그문트) is the King of Demonic Spectres and the Monarch of Transfiguration.

==== The Heirs of the Monarchs ====
As revealed in Ragnarok, the Monarchs all have successors to replace them if they are ever slain in battle. They are also able to pass down their powers to their children, as shown by how Jinwoo's son Suho was born with powers similar to his father's and accidentally awakened them as a toddler. It is also revealed that a Monarch's title might not always be inherited by their successor and can be altered during the succession process. This was shown with Ammut, who was converted into a suitable successor for Tarnak as the Monarch of Iron Body. The Heirs serves as Suho's main allies in the fight against the Itarim.
Esil Radiru
Voiced by: Riho Sugiyama (Japanese); Jad Saxton (English)
Esil Radiru (에실 라디루) is a demon noble and the eldest princess of the Radiru Clan, whom Jinwoo first encountered on the 80th floor of the Demon Castle. After being effortlessly defeated by Jinwoo, she becomes his guide in exchange for her life. They become allies in overthrowing Baran. In Ragnarok, as the last living demon noble, Esil is next in line to succeed Baran as the Queen of Demons and Monarch of Gluttony. She eventually becomes the second heir of the Monarchs that becomes an ally to Suho.
Gray
Gray (회색; Hoesaek) is the descendant of Rakan, and his successor as Monarch of Fangs. He is the first heir of the Monarchs that became an ally to Suho.
Ammut
Ammut (암무트) is a muscular reptilian humanoid who is about three times larger than the average adult human and has the head of a crocodile, who becomes the trainer of Suho. Suho meets with him during a raid of the Pyramid Field and frees him from a dungeon. He is current successor of Tarnak as the King of Monstrous Humanoids and Monarch of Trials.
Arsha
Arsha (아르샤) is a former servant of Querehsha's and later her successor as the Monarch of Plagues, who also works as a nightclub owner as one of Lee Minsung's business partners.
Sirka
Sirka (시르카) is Sillad's successor and granddaughter, the Queen of Snow Folk and Monarch of Nightmares. She is also an acquaintance of Cha Hae-In when she was stranded in the Chaos World.

=== Other characters ===
Yoo Myunghan
Voiced by: Shunsuke Sakuya (Japanese); June Yoon (English)
Japanese name: Akinari Morobishi (諸菱 明成, Morobishi Akinari)
Yoo Myunghan (유명한; Yu Myeonghan) is Jinho's strict, but caring father and the Chairman of Yoojin Construction, who seeks to build a Hunter guild for his family.
Ahn Sangmin
Voiced by: Hironori Kondo (Japanese); Cory Yee (English)
Japanese name: Koshiro Shishido (宍戸 耕史郎, Shishido Koshiro)
Ahn Sangmin (안상민; An Sangmin) is the chief of the White Tiger Guild's 2nd Division Management Department, who tries to recruit Jinwoo to the guild.
Matsumoto Shigeo
Voiced by: Naoya Uchida (Japanese); John Gremillion (English)
Matsumoto Shigeo (マツモト シゲオ) is the callous and manipulative Chairman of the Japanese Hunters Association who wanted Goto's group to take advantage of the Jeju Island situation in order to claim the land for Japan.
Rulers
The Rulers (지배자들; Jibaejadeul), also called the Fragments of Brilliant Light, are an ancient race of winged humanoids who aim to protect the human race from being annihilated by the Monarchs. Although they have noble ambitions, they are willing to use morally questionable methods to achieve them and are indirectly responsible for the millions of human lives lost ever since monsters first began using gates to cross over to the human world. The Rulers also heavily resemble angels in appearance and are able to use a form of telekinesis unique to themselves called Ruler's Authority.
Itarim
The Itarim (이타림), also known as the Outer Gods, are a race of gods who are responsible for having created all of existence and hail from outer universes. Sometime after the deaths of the Monarchs and the Absolute Being (who is revealed to be one of them) in Jinwoo's world, the Itarim discovers and takes interest in this. Intrigued by the now-masterless world he had left behind, they began to observe it and seek to take ownership of it. However, their presence did not go unnoticed, drawing the attention of the Rulers, who banded together with Jinwoo to oppose them. What followed was a brutal war of attrition between the Rulers and the Itarim. They serve as the main antagonists of Solo Leveling: Ragnarok.

== Media ==
=== Web novel ===
Solo Leveling was first serialized in Kakao's digital comic and fiction platform KakaoPage since July 25, 2016, and later published by D&C Media under their fantasy fiction label "Papyrus" in 14 volumes in its first edition and in 10 in second.

The novel was licensed in English by Webnovel under the title Only I Level Up and released from December 21, 2018, to June 24, 2019. The second edition of the novel was published in English by Yen Press from February 16, 2021, to July 18, 2023.

==== Volumes ====
No.	Korean release date	Korean ISBN
1	November 4, 2016	979-11-7033-666-2
2	November 4, 2016	979-11-7033-667-9
3	December 21, 2016	979-11-7033-755-3
4	January 25, 2017	979-11-7033-858-1
5	February 23, 2017	979-11-7033-911-3
6	March 20, 2017	979-11-7033-976-2
7	April 24, 2017	979-11-6140-318-2
8	May 24, 2017	979-11-6140-412-7
9	June 22, 2017	979-11-6140-467-7
10	July 20, 2017	979-11-6140-549-0
11	August 24, 2017	979-11-6140-626-8
12	September 21, 2017	979-11-6140-693-0
13	October 27, 2017	979-11-6140-827-9
Side Story	April 18, 2018	979-11-6268-337-8

==== Second edition ====
No.	Original release date	Original ISBN	English release date	English ISBN
1	August 19, 2019	979-11-364-0121-2	February 16, 2021	978-1-9753-1927-4
2	August 19, 2019	979-11-364-0122-9	June 22, 2021	978-1-9753-1929-8
3	August 19, 2019	979-11-364-0123-6	October 19, 2021	978-1-9753-1931-1
4	August 19, 2019	979-11-364-0124-3	April 5, 2022	978-1-9753-1933-5
5	August 19, 2019	979-11-364-0125-0	August 9, 2022	978-1-9753-1935-9
6	August 19, 2019	979-11-364-0126-7	December 13, 2022	978-1-9753-1937-3
7	August 19, 2019	979-11-364-0127-4	March 21, 2023	978-1-9753-1939-7
8	August 19, 2019	979-11-364-0128-1	July 18, 2023	978-1-9753-1941-0

=== Webtoon ===
A webtoon adaptation launched in KakaoPage on March 4, 2018, and concluded its first season on March 19, 2020; its second season began on August 1, 2020, concluding on December 29, 2021 with its 179th chapter. It was illustrated by Jang Sung-rak (aka Dubu), the CEO of Redice Studio, who died on July 23, 2022, after suffering from a cerebral hemorrhage. Its first collected volume was released by D&C Media on September 26, 2019. In Japan, Solo Leveling launched in Kakao Japan's digital comic service Piccoma, and has accumulated over 650 million cumulative readership. It was also selected as the No. 1 webtoon in Piccoma's "Best of 2019". The webtoon has been published digitally in English by Webnovel and Tappytoon since May 7 and June 4, 2020, respectively. It is also published on Tapas in English. The collected volumes have been licensed and published in North America by Yen Press since March 2, 2021.

A side story was published between January and May 2023, with Chugong returning as writer and featuring a new art team following the death of Dubu.

==== Volumes ====
No.	Original release date	Original ISBN	English release date	English ISBN
1	September 26, 2019	979-11-89320-29-4	March 2, 2021	978-1-9753-1943-4
2	January 30, 2020	979-11-89320-36-2	July 20, 2021	978-1-9753-1945-8
3	August 27, 2020	979-11-89320-69-0	November 16, 2021	978-1-9753-3651-6
4	April 29, 2021	979-11-91363-73-9	May 10, 2022	978-1-9753-3724-7
5	October 7, 2021	979-11-6777-002-8	September 20, 2022	978-1-9753-4438-2
6	July 25, 2022	979-11-6777-037-0	March 21, 2023	979-8-4009-0026-6
7	February 22, 2023	979-11-6777-070-7	August 22, 2023	979-8-4009-0048-8
8	May 25, 2023	979-11-6777-089-9	January 23, 2024	979-8-4009-0107-2
9	August 30, 2023	979-11-6777-113-1	August 20, 2024	979-8-4009-0193-5
10	April 18, 2024	979-11-93549-81-0	November 19, 2024	979-8-4009-0253-6
11	June 4, 2024	979-11-93821-20-6	February 18, 2025	979-8-4009-0255-0
12	August 29, 2024	979-11-93821-39-8	May 20, 2025	979-8-4009-0257-4
13	November 28, 2024	979-11-93821-73-2	August 19, 2025	979-8-4009-0259-8
14	June 9, 2025	979-11-7382-011-3	December 30, 2025	979-8-4009-0464-6
15	October 20, 2025	979-11-7382-051-9	March 17, 2026	979-8-4009-0466-0

=== Anime ===
An anime television series adaptation was announced at Anime Expo 2022. It is produced by A-1 Pictures and directed by Shunsuke Nakashige, with Noboru Kimura writing the scripts, and Tomoko Sudo designing the characters. It was originally scheduled for 2023, but was later delayed and eventually aired from January 7 to March 31, 2024, on Tokyo MX and other networks. (Note: Tokyo MX, GYT, GTV and BS11 all list the series premiere as January 6 at 24:00, which is effectively January 7 at midnight JST) The first episodes were screened from December 2023 in Tokyo, Seoul, Los Angeles, India, and Europe.

Crunchyroll is streaming the series. Medialink licensed the series in Southeast Asia and Oceania (except Australia and New Zealand).

After the broadcast of the first season finale, a second season titled Solo Leveling: Arise from the Shadow was announced. It aired from January 5 to March 30, 2025. (Note: Tokyo MX, GYT, GTV and BS11 all list the season premiere as January 4 at 24:00, which is effectively January 5 at midnight JST) A compilation film of the first season, titled Solo Leveling: ReAwakening, was screened along with the first two episodes of the second season in Japan from November 29 to December 12, 2024. Crunchyroll had acquired the North American and select international rights for the compilation film, screening it in the United States and Canada on December 6, 2024.

==== Film ====
A sequel anime film titled Solo Leveling: Beyond the System was announced during Crunchyroll's panel at Anime Expo 2026. The film will be produced by A-1 Pictures and directed by Tao Tajima, while Crunchyroll, Aniplex, Netmarble, D&C Media, and Kakao Piccoma were co-producing the film.

==== Music ====
The original music of the series is composed by Hiroyuki Sawano. The series' opening theme song is "Level", performed by SawanoHiroyuki[nZk]: Tomorrow X Together, while the ending theme song is "Request", performed by Krage. The original soundtrack was released in Japan by Aniplex and in the United States by Milan Records on March 27, 2024. Milan Records released the soundtrack on vinyl records in the United States on October 4, 2024.

For the second season, the opening theme song is "Reawaker", performed by LiSA (feat. Felix of Stray Kids), while the ending theme song is "Un-Apex", performed by TK from Ling Tosite Sigure.

=== Live-action series ===
In July 2025, Netflix was announced to be producing a live-action television series based on the manhwa with Byeon Woo-seok starring as Sung Jin-woo, and Han So-hee as Cha Hae-in. Kang You-seok was reportedly cast as Yoo Jinho, while Kang Mi-na was also confirmed for an undisclosed role. The series is produced by Kakao Entertainment and Sanai Pictures.

=== Games ===
- In January 2022, Netmarble announced that they were developing Solo Leveling: Arise, an action role-playing video game based on the series. The game was released on May 8, 2024.
- Otherworld, a Cube Entertainment subsidiary, developed Solo Leveling: Unlimited, a blockchain-based Web3 digital collectible project.
- In July 2025, Netmarble announced that they are developing the game Solo Leveling: Karma for PC and mobile.
- In October 2026, Solo Leveling did a collaboration with Overwatch called The Shadow Monarch. It added skins from the anime into the game.

== Continuation ==
=== Solo Leveling: Ragnarok ===
In April 2023, Kakao announced a sequel titled Solo Leveling: Ragnarok. The web novel began releasing through KakaoPage on April 10, 2023.

The story is set after the events of Solo Leveling; the side story acts as a prelude. Sung Su-ho, the son of Sung Jin-woo and Cha Hae-in, inherited his father's powers as the Shadow Monarch. However, his powers and memories were locked as a child, so he can have a normal life. But when Gates started to open up around Earth again during his third year of university, Su-ho is chosen as a Player by the System. Therefore, Su-ho must become a Hunter in order to face the new threat that is related to his parents' disappearance.

The web novel is written by Daul, who replaced Chugong, the writer of the original Solo Leveling web novel. Chugong revealed his support of Daul and the sequel, saying the sequel evoked the same emotions in him that he felt when he first began serializing the original web novel. The first 104 chapters debuted on KakaoPage on April 10, 2023. The web novel ended in July 2025 with 357 chapters.

The webtoon adaptation premiered on July 31, 2024, being developed by Redice Studio. Dangdo is the main writer adapting Daul's story, while Jin is the main artist.

== Reception ==
=== Web novel ===
Since 2016, the novel has garnered 2.4 million readers in KakaoPage. Since its release, the web novel has received constant positive reception. Eun Yoon of Fugue ranked the book fifth in her list of best web novels, describing it as "a stand-out in the genre, offering thrilling and enjoyable reads for fans of action-packed fantasy". Adam Symchuk from Asian Movie Pulse called it a "page turner", stating, "at 315 pages I found myself getting through the series in a couple days. There is a great sense of reward as you get to see Jinwoo level up and the new problems that arise as he heads towards godlike power. The only negative, having to wait for the next book as two major conflicts get introduced in the closing chapters."

Timothy Blade of Comic Book Resources, however, had a more negative review of the novel's ending, commenting on its "controversial" nature and calling out the number of plot holes and inconsistencies. He also described the comic's ending as a "more rushed version" of the novel's ending, further stating, "Jinwoo seemingly didn't need a grand, heroic reason for having power, making the reason as simple as wanting to live with and protect those he loved in the Solo Leveling ending."

=== Anime ===
==== Critical response ====
On review aggregator website Rotten Tomatoes, the first season of Solo Leveling holds an approval rating of 100% based on nine reviews, with an average rating of 7.7/10. The series premiere received generally positive reviews by the writers of Anime News Network. Rebecca Silverman felt that the gore in any scenes was not "excessive" and found the story interesting. Nicholas Dupree praised the writing, action scenes, score, and execution, but criticized the exposition and characters. Richard Eisenbeis praised the world-building while James Beckett praised the storytelling and execution, noting that Sung Jin-woo is a "likable" enough lead that "his nondescript niceness is much preferable over the edgy dweebs that you sometimes get as the heroes of these kinds of fantasy power trips." Rafael Motamayor of IGN gave the first season a score of 8/10, praising its animation, action sequences, visuals, choreography, soundtrack, and world-building, while criticizing the tedious mechanics and the lack of "nuance" in writing.

==== Accolades ====
Year	Award	Category	Recipient	Result	Ref.
2024	4th Astra TV Awards	Best Anime Series	Solo Leveling	Won	
2024	IGN Awards	Best Anime Series	Solo Leveling	Nominated	
2025	7th Global Demand Awards	Most In-Demand Anime Series of 2024	Solo Leveling	Nominated	
2025	9th Crunchyroll Anime Awards	Anime of the Year	Solo Leveling	Won	
2025	9th Crunchyroll Anime Awards	Best New Series	Solo Leveling	Won	
2025	9th Crunchyroll Anime Awards	Best Action	Solo Leveling	Won	
2025	9th Crunchyroll Anime Awards	Best Animation	Solo Leveling	Nominated	
2025	9th Crunchyroll Anime Awards	Best Main Character	Sung Jin-woo	Won	
2025	9th Crunchyroll Anime Awards	Best Score	Hiroyuki Sawano	Won	
2025	9th Crunchyroll Anime Awards	Best Anime Song	"Level" by SawanoHiroyuki[nZk]: Tomorrow X Together	Nominated	
2025	9th Crunchyroll Anime Awards	Best Opening Sequence	"Level" by SawanoHiroyuki[nZk]: Tomorrow X Together	Nominated	
2025	9th Crunchyroll Anime Awards	Best Ending Sequence	"Request" by Krage	Won	
2025	9th Crunchyroll Anime Awards	Best VA Performance (English)	Aleks Le as Sung Jin-woo	Won	
2025	9th Crunchyroll Anime Awards	Best VA Performance (Castilian)	Masumi Mutsuda as Sung Jin-woo	Won	
2025	9th Crunchyroll Anime Awards	Best VA Performance (Hindi)	Rajesh Shukla as Sung Jin-woo	Nominated	
2025	9th Crunchyroll Anime Awards	Best VA Performance (Portuguese)	Charles Emmanuel as Sung Jin-woo	Won	
2025	5th Astra TV Awards	Best Anime Series	Solo Leveling: Arise from the Shadow	Nominated	
2025	5th Astra TV Awards	Best Lead Voice-Over Performance	Aleks Le as Sung Jin-woo	Won	
2025	5th Astra TV Awards	Best Supporting Voice-Over Performance	Justin Briner as Yoo Jin-ho	Nominated	
2025	Japan Expo Awards	Daruma for Best Anime	Solo Leveling	Nominated	
2025	Japan Expo Awards	Daruma for Best Action Anime	Solo Leveling	Nominated	
2025	Japan Expo Awards	Daruma for Best Original Soundtrack	Hiroyuki Sawano	Nominated	
2025	20th AnimaniA Awards	Best TV Series: Online	Solo Leveling	Won	
2025	20th AnimaniA Awards	Best Director	Shunsuke Nakashige	Nominated	
2025	20th AnimaniA Awards	Best Studio	A-1 Pictures	Nominated	
2025	20th AnimaniA Awards	Best Anime Song	"Level" by SawanoHiroyuki[nZk]: Tomorrow X Together	Nominated	
2025	15th Newtype Anime Awards	Best Work (TV/Streaming)	Solo Leveling: Arise from the Shadow	4th place	
2025	15th Newtype Anime Awards	Best Studio	A-1 Pictures	Won	
2025	Asian Pop Music Awards	Best Collaboration	"Reawaker" by LiSA (feat. Felix of Stray Kids)	Nominated	
2026	8th Global Demand Awards	Most In-Demand Anime Series of 2025	Solo Leveling	Nominated	
2026	53rd Saturn Awards	Best Animated Television Series or Event	Solo Leveling: Arise from the Shadow	Nominated	
2026	10th Crunchyroll Anime Awards	Best Continuing Series	Solo Leveling: Arise from the Shadow	Nominated	
2026	10th Crunchyroll Anime Awards	Best Action	Solo Leveling: Arise from the Shadow	Won	
2026	10th Crunchyroll Anime Awards	Best Animation	Solo Leveling: Arise from the Shadow	Won	
2026	10th Crunchyroll Anime Awards	Best Main Character	Sung Jin-woo	Nominated	
2026	10th Crunchyroll Anime Awards	Best Score	Hiroyuki Sawano	Nominated	
2026	10th Crunchyroll Anime Awards	Best Anime Song	"Reawaker" by LiSA (feat. Felix of Stray Kids)	Nominated	
2026	10th Crunchyroll Anime Awards	Best Opening Sequence	"Reawaker" by LiSA (feat. Felix of Stray Kids)	Nominated	
2026	10th Crunchyroll Anime Awards	Best Ending Sequence	"Un-Apex" by TK from Ling Tosite Sigure	Nominated	
2026	10th Crunchyroll Anime Awards	Best VA Performance (Hindi)	Rajesh Shukla as Sung Jin-woo	Nominated	
2026	10th Crunchyroll Anime Awards	Best VA Performance (Spanish)	Fernando Moctezuma as Sung Jin-woo	Nominated	
2026	Music Awards Japan	Top Global Hit from Japan	"Reawaker" by LiSA (feat. Felix of Stray Kids)	Nominated	
2026	Music Awards Japan	Best Cross-Border Collaboration Song	"Reawaker" by LiSA (feat. Felix of Stray Kids)	Nominated	
2026	Music Awards Japan	Top Japanese Song in Europe	"Reawaker" by LiSA (feat. Felix of Stray Kids)	Nominated	
2026	Japan Expo Awards	Daruma for Best Action Anime	Solo Leveling: Arise from the Shadow	Nominated	
2026	Japan Expo Awards	Daruma for Best Original Soundtrack	Solo Leveling: Arise from the Shadow	Nominated	
2026	21st AnimaniA Awards	Best TV Sequel Series: Online	Solo Leveling: Arise from the Shadow	Nominated	
2026	21st AnimaniA Awards	Best Anime Song	"Reawaker" by LiSA (feat. Felix of Stray Kids)	Won	
