= Taito Ban =

Japanese voice actor (born 1992)

- 坂 泰斗
- Born: December 18, 1992 (age 33); Fukuoka Prefecture, Japan
- Occupation: Voice actor
- Years active: 2007–present
- Agents: Pro-Fit (2017–2022); Office Osawa (2022–present)
- Known for: Solo Leveling as Sung Jin-woo; Vazzrock the Animation as Ayumu Tachibana; Shinobi no Ittoki as Suzaki Ban; The Angel Next Door Spoils Me Rotten as Amane Fujimiya

Taito Ban (坂 泰斗, Ban Taito; born December 18, 1992) is a Japanese voice actor from Fukuoka Prefecture who is affiliated with Office Osawa. He was previously affiliated with the agency Pro-Fit until it ceased operations in 2022. Among his notable roles are as Sung Jin-woo in Solo Leveling, Ayumu Tachibana in Vazzrock the Animation, Suzaku Ban in Shinobi no Ittoki, and Amane Fujimiya in The Angel Next Door Spoils Me Rotten.

== Filmography ==
=== Anime series ===
2020

- Sorcerous Stabber Orphen as Hartia
- Deca-Dence as Mikey

2021

- 86 as Tozan Sasha
- Pretty Boy Detective Club as Nagahiro Sakiguchi

2022

- Is It Wrong to Try to Pick Up Girls in a Dungeon? IV as Luvix Lilix
- Shinobi no Ittoki as Suzaku Ban
- Vazzrock the Animation as Ayumu Tachibana

2023

- The Angel Next Door Spoils Me Rotten as Amane Fujimiya
- Oshi no Ko as Kengo Morimoto
- Yakitori: Soldiers of Misfortune as Akira Ihotsu
- Synduality: Noir as Kurokamen / Macht Ewigkeit
- Bastard!! Season 2 as Vai Staebe
- Dr. Stone as Soyuz
- Under Ninja as Kurō Kumogakure
- I Shall Survive Using Potions! as Roland

2024

- Solo Leveling as Sung Jin-woo
- As a Reincarnated Aristocrat, I'll Use My Appraisal Skill to Rise in the World as Ritsu Muses
- Frieren: Beyond Journey's End as Ton
- Go! Go! Loser Ranger! as Footsoldier F
- Suicide Squad Isekai as Adam
- A Terrified Teacher at Ghoul School! as Kōtarō Hijita
- Blue Lock vs. U-20 Japan as Itsuki Wakatsuki

2025

- Medalist as Shinichiro Sonidori
- Flower and Asura as Setarō Hakoyama
- Kowloon Generic Romance as Tao Gwen
- Fermat Kitchen as Kai Asakura
- Dusk Beyond the End of the World as Kalcrom
- Yano-kun's Ordinary Days as Hashiba
- A Star Brighter Than the Sun as Yota Ayukawa
- Pass the Monster Meat, Milady! as Aristide Roger de Galbraith
- May I Ask for One Final Thing? as Kyle von Paristan
- Disney Twisted-Wonderland: The Animation as Jack Howl
- Ninja vs. Gokudo as Attacker

2026

- Recommendations from Iwamoto-senpai as Kodō Iwamoto
- The Ogre's Bride as Takamichi Araki
- Thunder 3 as Teiichi Segami
- Mebius Dust as Shōsei
- The Frontier Lord Begins with Zero Subjects as Klaus

2027

- Fall in Love, You False Angels as Toki Ninomae
- Witch and Mercenary as Zig Crane

TBA

- The Eccentric Doctor of the Moon Flower Kingdom as Shingdam

=== Original video animation (OVA) ===
2024

- Code Geass: Rozé of the Recapture as Shōta Munemori

=== Video games ===
2019

- Fire Emblem: Three Houses as Ferdinand von Aegir

2020

- Disney Twisted-Wonderland as Jack Howl

2022

- Fire Emblem Warriors: Three Hopes as Ferdinand von Aegir

=== Anime films ===
2018

- Flavors of Youth as Shaomin

2024

- Given Hiiragi Mix as Shizusumi Yagi
- Dead Dead Demon's Dededede Destruction as Naoki Watarase

=== Dubbing ===
- My Adventures with Superman as Clark Kent / Kal-El / Superman
