= Mashle =

Japanese manga series by Hajime Kōmoto

- Mashle: Magic and Muscles
- First tankōbon volume cover, featuring Mash Burnedead

マッシュル-MASHLE- (Masshuru)
- Genre: Adventure; Fantasy comedy
- Manga
- Written by: Hajime Kōmoto
- Published by: Shueisha
- English publisher: NA: Viz Media
- Imprint: Jump Comics
- Magazine: Weekly Shōnen Jump
- Original run: January 27, 2020 – July 3, 2023
- Volumes: 18
- Anime television series
- Directed by: Tomonari Tanaka
- Produced by: Souta Furuhashi; Diana Lu; Takao Shimazaki (S1)
- Written by: Yōsuke Kuroda
- Music by: Masaru Yokoyama
- Studio: A-1 Pictures
- Licensed by: NA: Aniplex of America; UK: Anime Limited; SA/SEA: Medialink
- Original network: Tokyo MX, GTV, GYT, BS11
- English network: US: Adult Swim (Toonami)
- Original run: April 8, 2023 – present
- Episodes: 24
- Live-action film
- Directed by: Yūichi Fukuda
- Written by: Yūichi Fukuda
- Studio: Credeus
- Released: March 19, 2027
- icon

Mashle: Magic and Muscles (Japanese: マッシュル-MASHLE-, Hepburn: Masshuru) is a Japanese manga series written and illustrated by Hajime Kōmoto. It was serialized in Shueisha's shōnen manga magazine Weekly Shōnen Jump from January 2020 to July 2023, with its chapters collected in 18 tankōbon volumes.

An anime television series adaptation produced by A-1 Pictures aired from April to July 2023. A second season aired from January to March 2024. A third season is set to premiere in January 2027. A live-action film adaptation is set to premiere in March 2027.

== Plot ==
Set in a magical world in which an individual's position within society is defined by their power and skill with magic, Mash Burnedead is a young man without so much as an ounce of magic in his blood. In order to live a peaceful life with his adoptive father, Regro, Mash will need to become a Divine Visionary (神覚者, Shinkakusha), a title which is only given to exceptional students from the Easton Magic Academy. Despite having no magic whatsoever, Mash goes to the magic school, determined to survive and show the world that muscles can beat magic.

== Media ==
=== Manga ===
Written and illustrated by Hajime Kōmoto, Mashle: Magic and Muscles was serialized in Shueisha's shōnen manga magazine Weekly Shōnen Jump from January 27, 2020, to July 3, 2023. Shueisha collected its chapters in 18 tankōbon volumes, released from June 4, 2020, to October 4, 2023. A special one-shot chapter was published in Weekly Shōnen Jump on January 6, 2024, on the occasion of the anime series' second-season premiere.

The manga was digitally serialized by Viz Media and Manga Plus in English. In October 2020, Viz Media announced the print and digital publication of the manga; the volumes were released from July 6, 2021, to December 3, 2024.

=== Anime ===
An anime television series adaptation was announced in July 2022. The anime series is produced by A-1 Pictures and directed by Tomonari Tanaka, with scripts written by Yōsuke Kuroda, character designs by Hisashi Toshima, and music composed by Masaru Yokoyama. According to the official website of the series, it will be a "complete" anime adaptation. The first season aired from on Tokyo MX and other networks from April 8 to July 1, 2023. (Note: Tokyo MX listed the air dates for the series on Friday at 24:00, which is effectively Saturday at midnight JST) The opening theme song for the first season is "Knock Out", performed by Taiiku Okazaki, while the ending theme song is "Shū Cream Funk" (シュークリーム・ファンク; "Cream Puff Funk"), performed by The Dance for Philosophy.

A second season was announced after the airing of the first-season finale. Titled Mashle: Magic and Muscles – The Divine Visionary Candidate Exam (マッシュル-MASHLE- 神覚者候補選抜試験編, Masshuru: Shinkakusha Kōho Senbatsu Shiken-hen), it broadcast from January 6 to March 30, 2024. The opening theme song for the second season is "Bling-Bang-Bang-Born", performed by Creepy Nuts, while the ending theme song is "Tokyo's Way!" (トーキョーズ・ウェイ！), performed by Shiritsu Ebisu Chugaku.

In May 2024, a sequel to the television series was announced. It was later confirmed to be a third season, adapting the "Tri-Magicathalon Divine Visionary Final Exam" arc. The season is set to premiere on January 10, 2027. (Note: Tokyo MX listed the air dates for the season on Saturday at 24:00, which is effectively Sunday at midnight JST)

Aniplex of America revealed an English version of the announcement video at its Anime Expo panel on July 3, 2022. On February 21, 2023, Crunchyroll announced that they would stream the series; an English dub premiered on May 26 of the same year. In October 2024 at its New York Comic Con panel, Aniplex of America announced that the English dub would broadcast on Adult Swim's Toonami programming block beginning on November 10 of the same year. The second season premiered on the same programming block on November 9, 2025. Medialink licensed the series in Asia-Pacific. In October 2026, Anime Limited announced that it would release the first season of the series in a Collector's Edition Blu-ray set in the United Kingdom in 2027.

=== Live-action film ===
In November 2026, it was announced that the manga would receive a live-action film adaptation. The film is directed and screenwritten by Yūichi Fukuda. Warner Bros. and Fuji Television are overseeing the project, and Credeus is producing it. It will be distributed by Toho and is set to premiere on March 19, 2027.

=== Novels ===
Kiyoko Hoshi has written three novels based on the series; the first one, titled Mashle: Mash Burnedead to Bōken no Sho 1 (マッシュル-MASHLE- マッシュ・バーンデッドと冒険の書1; lit. 'Mashle: Mash Burnedead and the Book of Adventure 1'), was released on May 2, 2022; the second one, Mashle: Mash Burnedead to Fukkatsu no Jumon (マッシュル-MASHLE- マッシュ・バーンデッドと復活の呪文; lit. 'Mashle: Mash Burnedead and the Resurrection Spell'), was released on April 4, 2023; and the third one, Mashle: Mash Burnedead to Gangan Ikōze (マッシュル-MASHLE- マッシュ・バーンデッドとガンガンいこうぜ; lit. 'Mashle: Mash Burnedead and Going with a Bang'), was released on October 4 of the same year.

=== Stage plays ===
A stage play adaptation of the manga was announced in April 2023. It ran at the Tokyo International Forum Hall C in Tokyo from July 4–11, and at the AiiA 2.5 Theater Kobe in Hyogo from July 15–17. The play is directed by Imagine Ito, written by Shinjirō Kameda, music composed by Shingo I with lyrics by Yūji Mitsuya, and choreographed by Umebou. The cast includes Ryotaro Akazawa as Mash Burnedead, Hiroi Yuto as Finn Ames, Ryoga Ishikawa as Lance Crown, Takeshi James Yamada as Dot Barrett, and Misato Kawauchi as Lemon Irvine.

A second stage play adaptation was announced in December 2023. It ran at the Tennozu Galaxy Theater in Tokyo from August 2–12, 2024, and at the AiiA 2.5 Theater Kobe in Hyogo from August 17–19.

=== Video game ===
In March 2025, Poppin Games Japan and MuscleMagic Games announced that the series would receive a smartphone puzzle game titled Mashle: Muscle Puzzle (マッシュル-MASHLE- マッスルパズル, Masshuru Massuru Pazuru). The 3-match puzzle game incorporates the series' worldview, allowing players to form teams with their favorite characters, and features new illustrations. It is free to play but have optional in-game purchases. The game became for pre-registration on the App Store and was later available for pre-registration on Google Play. It was released on April 9, 2025.

== Reception ==
=== Manga ===
In June 2020, it was reported that the first volume of the series performed well enough to be sold out. By April 2021, the manga had over 1.4 million copies in circulation; over 2.1 million copies in circulation by August of the same year; over 3 million copies in circulation by March 2022; over 4 million copies in circulation by November of the same year; over 5 million copies in circulation by April 2023; over 6 million copies in circulation by November 2023; over 10 million copies in circulation by March 2024; and over 12 million copies in circulation by December 2025.

In 2020, the manga was nominated for the sixth Next Manga Awards and placed eleventh out of the 50 nominees with 12,894 votes. The series ranked third on the "Nationwide Bookstore Employees' Recommended Comics of 2021" by the Honya Club website. Mashle was nominated for the 67th Shogakukan Manga Award in the shōnen category in 2021.

The Nippon Foundation included the manga on their list of "5 Recommended Manga Available in English" and wrote: "[c]omic scenes of characters tormenting each other are fun to read, with no sense of distaste. In an amusing way, the story shows how cultivating special skills can overcome adversity." Writing for Le Figaro, Clémence Ballandras made a positive review about the series and wrote that it "combines the very specific universe of manga, with that of Harry Potter, while infusing a good dose of humor." Rebecca Silverman of Anime News Network gave the first volume a B+. Silverman praised the series for its humor, calling it a "Harry Potter parody with overtones of One-Punch Man." Silverman, however, wrote that apart from Mash, the rest of the characters are "forgettable" and said that the art is "fairly unattractive", comparing it to Mob Psycho 100. Nevertheless, she concluded: "It doesn't look pretty, but it also doesn't need to, making this a good addition to the library of humor manga."

Sheena McNeil of Sequential Tart gave the first volume a 7 out of 10. McNeil also noted the similarities with One-Punch Man and Harry Potter, praising as well its story and art, concluding: "I enjoyed this read a fair amount. It's low key hilarious. It has flaws, but it also has potential, and I look forward to where it goes from here." In a review of the second volume, McNeil gave it a 8, and wrote: "[i]f you want action, humor, and magic, this story hits you over the head with all three."

=== Anime ===
Year	Award	Category	Recipient	Result	Ref.
2023	Reiwa Anisong Awards	Arrangement Award	"Shū Cream Funk" by The Dance for Philosophy (Note: Kentaro credited as nominee.)	Nominated	
2024	8th Crunchyroll Anime Awards	Best Comedy	Mashle: Magic and Muscles	Nominated	
2024	8th Crunchyroll Anime Awards	Best Fantasy	Mashle: Magic and Muscles	Nominated	
2024	8th Crunchyroll Anime Awards	Best Voice Artist Performance (Spanish)	Gerardo Ortega as Mash Burnedead	Nominated	
2024	8th Crunchyroll Anime Awards	Best Voice Artist Performance (Castilian)	David Flores as Dot Barrett	Nominated	
2024	10th Anime Trending Awards	Best in Soundtrack	Mashle: Magic and Muscles	Nominated	
2024	10th Anime Trending Awards	Ending Theme Song of the Year	"Shū Cream Funk" by The Dance for Philosophy	Nominated	
2024	10th Anime Trending Awards	Comedy Anime of the Year	Mashle: Magic and Muscles	Won	
2024	10th Anime Trending Awards	Fantasy Anime of the Year	Mashle: Magic and Muscles	Nominated	
2024	TikTok First Half Trend Awards	Special Award	"Bling-Bang-Bang-Born" by Creepy Nuts	Won	
2024	TikTok First Half Trend Awards	Special Award	Mashle: Magic and Muscles	Won	
2024	46th Anime Grand Prix	Best Theme Song	"Bling-Bang-Bang-Born" by Creepy Nuts	7th place	
2024	U-Can New Words and Buzzwords Awards	New Words and Buzzwords Awards	"Bling-Bang-Bang-Born" by Creepy Nuts	Nominated	
2024	Yahoo! Japan Search Awards	Anime Category	Mashle: Magic and Muscles	Won	
2024	Yahoo! Japan Search Awards	Music Category	"Bling-Bang-Bang-Born" by Creepy Nuts	Won	
2024	TikTok Awards Japan	Anime of the Year	Mashle: Magic and Muscles	Nominated	
2024	Billboard Japan Music Awards	Hot 100	"Bling-Bang-Bang-Born" by Creepy Nuts	Won	
2024	Billboard Japan Music Awards	Most Streaming Songs	"Bling-Bang-Bang-Born" by Creepy Nuts	Won	
2024	Billboard Japan Music Awards	Most Downloaded Songs	"Bling-Bang-Bang-Born" by Creepy Nuts	Won	
2024	Billboard Japan Music Awards	Hot Animation	"Bling-Bang-Bang-Born" by Creepy Nuts	Won	
2024	Billboard Japan Music Awards	Top User Generated Songs	"Bling-Bang-Bang-Born" by Creepy Nuts	Won	
2024	Billboard Japan Music Awards	Top Global Japan (Excl. Japan) Songs	"Bling-Bang-Bang-Born" by Creepy Nuts	Won	
2024	Billboard Japan Music Awards	Top Japan Songs (South Korea)	"Bling-Bang-Bang-Born" by Creepy Nuts	11th place	
2024	Billboard Japan Music Awards	Top Japan Songs (Thailand)	"Bling-Bang-Bang-Born" by Creepy Nuts	5th place	
2024	Billboard Japan Music Awards	Top Japan Songs (Singapore)	"Bling-Bang-Bang-Born" by Creepy Nuts	2nd place	
2024	Billboard Japan Music Awards	Top Japan Songs (India)	"Bling-Bang-Bang-Born" by Creepy Nuts	3rd place	
2024	Billboard Japan Music Awards	Top Japan Songs (France)	"Bling-Bang-Bang-Born" by Creepy Nuts	Won	
2024	Billboard Japan Music Awards	Top Japan Songs (United Kingdom)	"Bling-Bang-Bang-Born" by Creepy Nuts	Won	
2024	Billboard Japan Music Awards	Top Japan Songs (South Africa)	"Bling-Bang-Bang-Born" by Creepy Nuts	Won	
2024	Billboard Japan Music Awards	Top Japan Songs (United States)	"Bling-Bang-Bang-Born" by Creepy Nuts	Won	
2024	Billboard Japan Music Awards	Top Japan Songs (Brazil)	"Bling-Bang-Bang-Born" by Creepy Nuts	Won	
2024	Abema Anime Trend Awards	Anime Song Award	"Bling-Bang-Bang-Born" by Creepy Nuts	Won	
2024	66th Japan Record Awards	Grand Prix	"Bling-Bang-Bang-Born" by Creepy Nuts	Nominated	
2024	66th Japan Record Awards	Excellent Awards	"Bling-Bang-Bang-Born" by Creepy Nuts	Won	
2025	Reiwa Anisong Awards	Best Work Award	"Bling-Bang-Bang-Born" by Creepy Nuts	Won	
2025	Reiwa Anisong Awards	Best Anime Song Award	"Bling-Bang-Bang-Born" by Creepy Nuts	Won	
2025	11th Anime Trending Awards	Best in Soundtrack	Mashle: Magic and Muscles – The Divine Visionary Candidate Exam	Nominated	
2025	11th Anime Trending Awards	Opening Theme Song of the Year	"Bling-Bang-Bang-Born" by Creepy Nuts	Nominated	
2025	11th Anime Trending Awards	Ending Theme Song of the Year	"Tokyo's Way!" by Shiritsu Ebisu Chugaku	Nominated	
2025	11th Anime Trending Awards	Action or Adventure Anime of the Year	Mashle: Magic and Muscles – The Divine Visionary Candidate Exam	Nominated	
2025	11th Anime Trending Awards	Comedy Anime of the Year	Mashle: Magic and Muscles – The Divine Visionary Candidate Exam	Nominated	
2025	39th Japan Gold Disc Awards	Song of the Year by Download (Japan)	"Bling-Bang-Bang-Born" by Creepy Nuts	Won	
2025	39th Japan Gold Disc Awards	Top 3 Songs by Download	"Bling-Bang-Bang-Born" by Creepy Nuts	Won	
2025	39th Japan Gold Disc Awards	Song of the Year by Streaming (Japan)	"Bling-Bang-Bang-Born" by Creepy Nuts	Won	
2025	39th Japan Gold Disc Awards	Top 5 Songs by Streaming	"Bling-Bang-Bang-Born" by Creepy Nuts	Won	
2025	MTV Video Music Awards Japan	Song of the Year	"Bling-Bang-Bang-Born" by Creepy Nuts	Won	
2025	30th AMD Awards	Excellence Award	"Bling-Bang-Bang-Born" by Creepy Nuts	Won	
2025	43rd JASRAC Awards	Silver Award	"Bling-Bang-Bang-Born" by Creepy Nuts	Won	
2025	Music Awards Japan	Song of the Year	"Bling-Bang-Bang-Born" by Creepy Nuts	Won	
2025	Music Awards Japan	Best Japanese Song	"Bling-Bang-Bang-Born" by Creepy Nuts	Won	
2025	Music Awards Japan	Top Japanese Song in Asia	"Bling-Bang-Bang-Born" by Creepy Nuts	Nominated	
2025	Music Awards Japan	Top Japanese Song in Europe	"Bling-Bang-Bang-Born" by Creepy Nuts	Won	
2025	Music Awards Japan	Top Japanese Song in North America	"Bling-Bang-Bang-Born" by Creepy Nuts	Won	
2025	Music Awards Japan	Top Japanese Song in Latin America	"Bling-Bang-Bang-Born" by Creepy Nuts	Won	
2025	Music Awards Japan	Best Japanese Hip Hop/Rap Song	"Bling-Bang-Bang-Born" by Creepy Nuts	Won	
2025	Music Awards Japan	Best Japanese Dance Pop Song	"Bling-Bang-Bang-Born" by Creepy Nuts	Won	
2025	Music Awards Japan	Best Anime Song	"Bling-Bang-Bang-Born" by Creepy Nuts	Nominated	
2025	Music Awards Japan	Best Music Video	"Bling-Bang-Bang-Born" by Creepy Nuts	Nominated	
2025	Music Awards Japan	Best Viral Song	"Bling-Bang-Bang-Born" by Creepy Nuts	Won	
2025	Music Awards Japan	Best of Listeners' Choice: Japanese Song	"Bling-Bang-Bang-Born" by Creepy Nuts	Nominated	
2025	Music Awards Japan	Karaoke of the Year: J-Pop	"Bling-Bang-Bang-Born" by Creepy Nuts	Nominated	
2025	9th Crunchyroll Anime Awards	Best Comedy	Mashle: Magic and Muscles – The Divine Visionary Candidate Exam	Won	
2025	9th Crunchyroll Anime Awards	Best Anime Song	"Bling-Bang-Bang-Born" by Creepy Nuts	Nominated	
2025	9th Crunchyroll Anime Awards	Best Opening Sequence	"Bling-Bang-Bang-Born" by Creepy Nuts	Nominated	
2025	9th Crunchyroll Anime Awards	Best Voice Artist Performance (Portuguese)	Pedro Azevedo as Dot Barrett	Nominated	
2025	Japan Expo Awards	Daruma for Best Opening	"Bling-Bang-Bang-Born" by Creepy Nuts	Nominated	
2025	20th AnimaniA Awards	Best TV Series: Disc	Mashle: Magic and Muscles	Nominated	
2025	20th AnimaniA Awards	Best Anime Song	"Bling-Bang-Bang-Born" by Creepy Nuts	Nominated	
2026	44th JASRAC Awards	Bronze Award	"Bling-Bang-Bang-Born" by Creepy Nuts	Won	
