= Hajime Kōmoto =

Japanese manga artist

Hajime Kōmoto 甲本 一
- Born: Hajime Kōmoto
- Area: Manga artist
- Notable works: Mashle

Hajime Kōmoto (甲本 一, Kōmoto Hajime) is a Japanese manga artist known for creating the manga series Mashle. The series was serialized in Shueisha's shōnen manga magazine Weekly Shōnen Jump from January 2020 to July 2023, and its chapters were collected in 18 tankōbon volumes.

== Career ==
Kōmoto originally submitted the short manga Explosive Interview to Shueisha in 2018 under the pseudonym Koichi Kashiwazaki (柏崎 康一, Kashiwazaki Kōichi) and won the 89th Akatsuka Award Honorable Mention. Later, he drew the short manga Liberal Ethics Committee Member Yamada Taro under the same name and published it in Jump Giga; in the same year, he changed his pseudonym to Kōichirō (こういちろう) and published in Jump Giga a short manga titled God of Destruction Shivasaki.

Starting from 2020, Kōmoto was able to officially serialize the series Mashle in Weekly Shōnen Jump, becoming his first full-length work. Mashle immediately won the 11th place in the 2020 Next Manga Award, the 8th place in the 2021 Everyone's Choice Tsutaya Manga Award, and the 3rd place in the 2021 Nationwide Bookstore Employees and Publisher Comics' Recommended Comics. The manga ended in 2023, ending the three-and-a-half-year serialization.

== Artistry ==
Kōmoto noted that, while drawing, he pays close attention to "include an overall picture that allows you [the reader] to understand the relationship between the characters for the first time. When drawing action scenes, I try to devise 'a picture with a tight perspective from the inside to the front." As he prefers "dangerous" (やばい, yabai) characters, Kōmoto frequently features that word when describing characters that appear in his manga.

Kōmoto stated that his work has been influenced by One-Punch Man and Demon Slayer; he thought that adding items or motifs to the character design would make the character icon.

== Works ==
Completed works

- Explosive Interview (2018, under the name "Koichi Kashiwazaki").
- Liberal Ethics Committee member Yamada Taro (2019, Jump Giga; pseudonym "Kashiwazaki Koichi").
- God of Destruction Shivazaki (2019, Jump Giga; under the name "Kōichirō").

Serial work

- Mashle (2020–2023), Weekly Shōnen Jump, 18 volumes in total).

== Related people ==
- Yusuke Asai – Editor in charge
