= A Girl's Ego =

- My Hero Academia episode
- A still from the episode, showing Himiko Toga stabbing Ochaco Uraraka
- Episode no.: Season 7 Episode 20
- Directed by: Tsuyoshi Tobita
- Original air date: 5 October 2024

Episode chronology
← Previous "I Am Here"	Next → "Battle Without a Quirk"
- My Hero Academia season 7

A Girl's Ego (少女のエゴ, Shōjo no Ego) is the 20th episode of the seventh season of My Hero Academia, and the 158th overall episode. The episode depicts Ochaco Uraraka trying to reach out to Himiko Toga when Himiko avenges her comrades and lashes out in response to her rejection, but Ochaco gets stabbed in the process and successfully reaches out to Himiko.

The episode was directed by Tsuyoshi Tobita and premiered on 5 October 2024. Art promoting the episode included an illustration by Kōhei Horikoshi featuring Ochaco and Himiko lying down and holding hands. Critics praised the episode for its themes, voice acting, and animation, particularly where Himiko and Ochaco reconcile their differences.

== Background ==
My Hero Academia depicts Himiko Toga as a villain who joins a group of villains called the League of Villains, an organisation that first appears in the first season. According to Tony Cocking of Crunchyroll, Himiko has no clear plans other than to facilitate her life, and because of her fixation with love and blood, she could not conform to societal standards when she was younger, thus resolving to kill. Himiko behaves confidently until Hawks later kills a villain named Twice, or Jin Bubaigawara, and Himiko lures Ochaco by killing a woman. From Ochaco's perspective, Himiko murders; therefore, Himiko laments over the possibility of Ochaco killing her. Himiko has feelings for both Ochaco and Izuku Midoriya; but because they both reject Himiko, along with the fact her power influenced how she sees the world and her parents' denial of her humanity, she decides to murder heroes.

== Plot ==
This episode is an adaptation of the manga. To avenge her comrades and her societal rejection, Himiko Toga changes into Twice, increases herself such that heroes cannot fight her, and attacks the heroes with her horde. Ochaco reaches out to Himiko by talking to her; but Himiko angrily states her contempt for rules and desires to live how she pleases, then stabs Ochaco fatally. Consequently, Ochaco's power strengthens, causing the Twice clones in the horde to float. Ochaco denies pretending seeing Himiko smile. Himiko realises Ochaco cares for her, and she stops herself from stabbing Ochaco again. Himiko smiles and cries in front of Ochaco, asks if she is cute, and Ochaco says Himiko is "the cutest in the world".

== Voice cast ==
Ochaco Uraraka (麗日 お茶子, Uraraka Ochako)
Voiced by: Ayane Sakura (Japanese); Luci Christian (English)
Himiko Toga (トガ ヒミコ, Toga Himiko)
Voiced by: Misato Fukuen (Japanese); Leah Clark (English)
Izuku Midoriya (緑谷 出久, Midoriya Izuku)
Voiced by: Daiki Yamashita (Japanese); Justin Briner (English)
Katsuki Bakugo (爆豪 勝己, Katsuki Bakugo)
Voiced by: Nobuhiko Okamoto (Japanese); Clifford Chapin (English)
Tenya Ida (飯田 天哉, Īda Ten'ya)
Voiced by: Kaito Ishikawa (Japanese); J. Michael Tatum (English)
Tsuyu Asui (蛙吹 梅雨, Asui Tsuyu)
Voiced by: Aoi Yūki (Japanese); Monica Rial (English)
Kyoka Jiro (耳郎 響香, Jirō Kyōka)
Voiced by: Kei Shindō (Japanese); Trina Nishimura (English)

== Production and broadcast ==
Ayane Sakura and Misato Fukuen portrayed Ochaco Uraraka and Himiko Toga, respectively. In an interview with Anime Freaks, Sakura said she was bewildered at Kōhei Horikoshi's drawing and could not help but to cry, but Fukuen appreciated the resolution of Himiko's conflict, where she said Himiko was confined to normalcy. In an interview with MyNavi, Sakura said she cried during recording this episode, but Fukuen stated her memory went away and that she recorded politely. Sakura also said that she could finally understand Himiko Toga. According to Eric Himmelheber of Anime Corner, Fukuen's performance caused her to be sore for up to three days. After recording the episode, Fukuen felt thankful for Sakura's performance as Ochaco. When Hiro Shimono, Dabi's voice actor, watched this episode, he saddened. Leah Clark, the English dub actress for Himiko, inadvertently revealed the fate of her character. Luci Christian, who voiced Ochaco in the English dub, said that learning about Himiko's past was "painful" and validated its application to people growing up.

The episode was directed by Tsuyoshi Tobita and animated by Bones. It was released on 5 October 2024 on Yomiuri TV and Nippon TV. The episode was also released on Crunchyroll. To promote this episode, Horikoshi drew an illustration with Ochaco and Himiko lying together in a puddle of blood. Visuals of the episode featuring Himiko preparing to attack and crying floating tears behing Ochaco were also released to promote the episode.

== Reception ==
A writer for Anime Freaks reported that viewers of "A Girl's Ego" reacted tearfully toward the episode. Regarding Horikoshi's illustration to promote the episode, a writer for Oricon News stated fans reacted favourably to the illustration.

The episode received generally favourable reviews. Alexandra Bodden of Bleeding Cool and Charles Hartford of But Why Tho? wrote that "A Girl's Ego" has themes of societal rejection and attempts to correct Himiko backfiring. Hartford wrote that Himiko's circumstances require a "truly momentous" situation to approach her and reframe her behaviour. He also praised the animation quality for focusing on Ochaco's manoeuvres and pain. Bodden said that she felt remorse for Himiko and called Himiko and Ochaco's connection "heart-wrenching". She praised the episode's improvement in storytelling and felt sad about Ochaco's reply to Himiko. Kristen Carey of The Mary Sue called the relationship between Himiko and Ochaco a "tragic romance" in response to Himiko's choice to give her blood to Ochaco and see blood as something to give. Eric Himmelheber of Anime Corner praised Sakura and Fukuen's acting, stating that what the actresses experienced in recording the episode will allow viewers to appreciate the characters more than other fans; and he compared Ochaco and Himiko's relationship with that of Izuku Midoriya and Tomura Shigaraki, writing that the episode serves as what could have happened if they intervened when they were younger. Writing for Leisurebyte, Arpita Samaddar stated the flashbacks in Himiko's life were tragic and that Himiko and Ochaco reconciled their differences, giving a favourable review of the episode. A critic who went by the name Bolts on Anime News Network lamented Himiko's upbringing despite the crimes she commits, appreciated Ochaco's humility, and said this episode was one of the best in My Hero Academia.

Takara Tomy released a statue based on the episode in June 2026.

== See also ==
- My Hero Academia season 7 – Seventh season of My Hero Academia
- Ochaco Uraraka – Superhero from My Hero Academia
