= My Hero Academia season 7 =

Seventh season of My Hero Academia

My Hero Academia
- Season 7
- Cover art for the first home media volume of the seventh season as released by Toho Animation in July 2024
- No. of episodes: 21

Release
- Original network: ytv, NTV
- Original release: May 4 – October 12, 2024

Season chronology
- ← Previous; Season 6 Next → Season 8

The seventh season of the My Hero Academia anime television series was produced by Bones and directed by Kenji Nagasaki (chief director) and Naomi Nakayama, following the story of Kōhei Horikoshi's original My Hero Academia manga series from the beginning of the 34th volume through the end of the 39th volume (chapters 329–398). Unlike the previous five seasons which consisted of 25 episodes each, the season ran for 21 episodes. The seventh season aired on ytv and NTV from May 4 to October 12, 2024, with 4 "Memories" recap specials having aired in the preceding month of April.

The season introduces Star and Stripe, America's #1 Pro Hero, as she arrives to fight Tomura Shigaraki by All Might's request. While the U.A. High students and the remaining Pro Heroes take time in preparing for the final battle against the Villains of the Paranormal Liberation Front, things become complicated as one of Izuku's classmates is revealed to be a mole. With the young hero students contemplating whether they can save "villains", the Pro Heroes come together with a plan to divide and conquer the Villains' side as the war between both sides to determine the fate of the world begins.

Crunchyroll has licensed the season along with the "Memories" recap specials outside of Asia and is streaming it along with an English dub two weeks after the original airing on its streaming service of the same name. Medialink licensed the season in Asia-Pacific.

For the seventh season: the first opening theme song is "Tagatame" (誰我為; lit. 'For Someone's Sake') performed by TK from Ling Tosite Sigure, while the first ending theme song is "Tsubomi" (蕾; lit. 'Flower Bud') performed by Omoinotake. The second opening theme song is "Curtain Call" (カーテンコール) performed by Yuuri, while the second ending theme song is "Rokutōsei" (六等星; lit. 'Class 6 Star') performed by Zarame.

== Episodes ==
No. overall	No. in season	Title (Note: English translated titles are taken from Crunchyroll.)	Directed by	Storyboarded by	Original release date	Viewership rating
139	1	"In the Nick of Time! A Big-Time Maverick from the West!"; Transliteration: "Ōbei Girigiri!! Butchigiri no Sugoi Yatsu" (Japanese: 欧米ギリギリ!!ぶっちぎりの凄い奴)	Ikurō Satō	Naomi Nakayama	May 4, 2024	2.8%
Upon witnessing the current state of Japan as a result of Tomura Shigaraki, All For One, and the Jailbreakers running free, America's Number 1 Hero Star and Stripe and her military comrades defy their orders and make their way over to provide aid. Meanwhile, All For One, who lies hiding in a secret cave alongside Spinner, schemes to steal Star's Quirk which will guarantee his world domination plans. Skeptic also fuels the fire of the remaining Liberation Front members to use the League of Villains as their rallying point. As Endeavor, Hawks, and Best Jeanist head to rendezvous with Star, they receive word that Shigaraki, riding on a flying Nomu, has already intercepted her. The two proceed to clash in which Star demonstrates her Quirk, "New Order", capable of changing the rules of whatever or whoever she touches, as well as revealing how she was inspired by All Might. She attempts to use her Quirk on Shigaraki, however, as a result of his ongoing fusion with All For One, he is currently in a state of identity crisis, unsure if he is Shigaraki, All For One, or even Tenko Shimura. Shigaraki manages to deduce New Order's capabilities and desires it for himself, while Star prepares for her last resort. She transforms the air into a giant form of herself, and using a spear made of lasers keeps Shigaraki pinned down, as she awaits backup in the form of several guided missiles called "Tiamat".
140	2	"Specter"; Transliteration: "Bōrei" (Japanese: 亡霊)	Shōji Ikeno	Naomi Nakayama, Takahiro Komori & Tomo Ōkubo	May 11, 2024	3.2%
Star uses her Quirk to unleash the Tiamat missiles directly onto Shigaraki, however, having expected something like this, he manages to evade most of the damage of the explosion by decaying himself beneath the ocean. He makes his way toward Star across the fighter jets, as the pilots' leader Ethan Drive tries to sacrifice himself to try and defeat him. Star refuses to let Ethan die, and Shigaraki succeeds in touching Star's face, stealing New Order while simultaneously Decaying her; she attempts to use the Quirk to stop the decay, but her body reaches its strength limit. Shigaraki is about to use New Order, but his body suddenly begins to blow apart from the inside. Star had used New Order to declare that the Quirk would rebel against other Quirks, and within Shigaraki's body, the vestige of Star begins tearing apart Shigaraki, All For One, and the other Quirks, destroying several in the process. As Star's body decays away, she salutes her comrades while thanking All Might for letting her indulge in her dream. Shigaraki manages to desperately escape the jets and tries to store New Order in a criminal's body, but the Quirk itself is also destroyed; at the same time, deep within Shigaraki and All For One, Tenko Shimura calls out to Izuku Midoriya. Later, All Might meets up with the American soldiers who provide them with data they recorded during the fight with Shigaraki. He proceeds to reveal this information to Class 1-A, as the students excitedly prepare to continue their training for the incoming final battle to come.
141	3	"Villain"; Transliteration: "Viran" (Japanese: 敵(ヴィラン))	Tomo Ōkubo	Tomo Ōkubo	May 18, 2024	2.5%
A manic Shigaraki reunites with All For One and the League in their hideout, being forced on standby to heal his injuries. An impatient Dabi is told to wait a bit longer by All For One, as he starts to implement one of his many back-up plans. While Class 1-A continues their training, they discuss amongst themselves how they are at a disadvantage in the upcoming battle due to All For One's mastery of hiding, and wonder how to combat this. Elsewhere, Toru Hagakure spies on Yuga Aoyama and his parents deep in the woods, discovering that they are spies for All For One. It is revealed that Aoyama was born Quirkless, and not wanting him to feel ostracized, his parents made a deal with All For One to give him his Navel Laser Quirk, only to be forced into his debt with threats of death. As a result, Aoyama became the "U.A. Traitor", forced into revealing to the League about the U.S.J. and the Summer Camp. Izuku stumbles across them all, and a grief-stricken Aoyama tearfully confesses the truth, before he and his family attempt to flee. Before they can fight, Toru refracts a laser, partially revealing herself for the first time while crying in rage, while Izuku uses Blackwhip to restrain the Aoyamas. They are taken into custody by the Heroes, as everyone is stunned and unable to respond to the news. Aoyama explains all his regrets, while referring to himself as a "despicable villain", but despite this, Izuku recognizes him as a victim, and believes he still has a chance to redeem himself as a hero, leading to the other 1-A students to realize that Aoyama would be the key to lure All For One out of hiding.
142	4	"The Story of How We All Became Heroes"; Transliteration: "Min'na ga Hīrō ni Naru Made no Monogatari" (Japanese: 皆がヒーローになるまでの物語)	Shōji Ikeno	Shōji Ikeno	May 25, 2024	2.6%
The adults are still suspicious about trusting in Aoyama to cooperate, but the Class 1-A members reiterate their belief in him. Just then, Shota Aizawa appears on the computer monitor to take his students' side, intending not to expel Aoyama, while also revealing a plan to take advantage of him and get the drop on the Villains. The Aoyamas are taken away for further examination, while the remaining 1-A students regroup to head back out into battle. Izuku and Tenya Ida go to the Development Course for repairs on their support items where they reunite with Mei Hatsume, who is seemingly clueless about the state of the outside world. They learn that the Development students have been hard at work on upgrading the U.A. Barrier, while Mei effortlessly provides Izuku and Ida with replacements for their items. Meanwhile, All Might, Hawks, Ragdoll, the Police Force, and the American military form a "Counter-Force" in order to develop their plan to deal with the Villains. They decide that they all must be separated by at least 10 kilometres apart to ensure no cooperation, which will cause further trouble for them. At the same time, Aizawa talks to Aoyama personally, and is able to convince him to break free from the fear that All For One instilled within him, by putting his trust in his classmates and himself. Elsewhere, a costume-clad Hitoshi Shinso is called upon for assistance.
143	5	"Let You Down" (Note: Stylized in sentence case)	Tsuyoshi Tobita	Kazuhiro Yoneda	June 1, 2024	2.5%
Himiko Toga visits her abandoned family home and reflects upon her life growing up. Dabi appears and burns down her house as his own act of kindness. He also reveals that he had taken some blood from Twice's body during the Paranormal Liberation War and given it to Toga, since thanks to her Transform Quirk allowing her to use the Quirks of those she truly loves, she will be able to use his Double Quirk and his "Sad Man's Parade". Elsewhere, Shigaraki undergoes a disturbing transformation as a result of his body adjusting to the Quirk Singularity Theory. Skeptic tells Spinner that he must take command of the rioting heteromorphs who look up to him as a symbol, and he reluctantly accepts for Shigaraki's sake. Meanwhile, Class 1-A return to the dorms after a long day of battling jailbreakers, when All Might, Tsukauchi, and Nezu arrive to tell them the details of the upcoming war. The following day, Nezu announces to the U.A. refugees that the Villains will be planning to attack in just four days, while the 1-A students say goodbye to their families and others as they move into the Makeshift Fortress: Troy. On a nearby cliff, Izuku thanks Ochaco for her speech that allowed him to rest at U.A., and she reveals to him that during said speech, she thought about Toga's sad face during their previous encounter, and wonders if she is weird for feeling guilty despite the destruction they caused. Izuku reveals he feels the same regarding Shigaraki, and at the same time, Bakugo, Tenya, and Kirishima comfort Shoto over his feelings toward Dabi. On the day of the operation, All For One orders the Aoyamas to lure Izuku to an undisclosed location, using a lie detection Quirk to ensure they do not deceive him. Izuku meets up with Aoyama, who explains All For One's plans for global domination with his Quirk. All For One confronts them both, but to his shock, Aoyama betrays and attacks him. He proceeds to warp most of the Villains to their location to surround them, only to be caught off guard again when the Heroes are themselves warped to the location by Kurogiri's Warp Gate, starting the final battle.
144	6	"Division" (Note: Stylized in all caps)	Takafumi Hino	Akiko Ōtsuka	June 8, 2024	2.5%
A few days before the battle, All Might, Tsukauchi, and Nezu explain to Class 1-A their plan. In order to get the Aoyamas to deceive All For One, they will use Shinso's Brainwashing Quirk, which thanks to his training is able to make people speak, so that All For One will not detect any lies in their voices. Furthermore, in order to get around All For One observing them all with Search, they will use Kurogiri's Warp Gate Quirk to warp themselves onto the battlefield. Aizawa requests Neito Monoma's help to use his Copy Quirk on it, since Kurogiri is still inactive, and while he is initially apprehensive, he is convinced by the prospect of being the "puppet-master". As the fighting commences, Shigaraki is about to use his Decay, but is stopped by himself. All Might and Tsukauchi, observing the battle in a control center, activate "Operation Troy", causing large metal cages to surround most of the Villains, as they are then shoved into several more Warp Gates, splitting them up all over the country. All For One ends up in the ruins of the Gunga Mountain Villa, confronted by Endeavor and Hawks. Dabi ends up in Kamino Ward, confronted by Shoto. Shigaraki" ends up in a floating U.A. High to be confronted by Deku, however before he can enter the Warp Gate, he is snagged by Toga and taken to Okuto Island, where she is confronted by Ochaco. A team consisting of Bakugo, Best Jeanist, Edgeshot, Mirko, Tamaki Amajiki, and Nejire Hado prepare to take on Shigaraki even with Deku missing. Shigaraki starts to attack, but finds himself held back by the cage's defensives designed specifically to counter him, including structures that react to his Decay, an electric cage surrounding the barrier, and Monoma copying Aizawa's Erasure nearby. However suddenly, Shigaraki's fingers begin to mutate and attack.
145	7	"Inflation"	Tomo Ōkubo	Tomo Ōkubo	June 15, 2024	2.3%
The Heroes become confused and are forced on the defensive as Shigaraki begins unleashing an endless array of fingers from his hand that rampage throughout the coffin; he explains how it is not a Quirk, but rather the natural growth in his body as a result of the Quirk Singularity. Eraser Head gets in contact with Deku, and realizes that since Monoma would have to undo Erasure temporarily to Warp him over, which would allow Shigaraki to Decay everything with his fingers, he has to make it back on his own. The Heroes resolve to beat Shigaraki, even without One For All. Meanwhile on Okuto Island, while the Heroes and the Villains battle, Deku and Ochaco are confronted by Toga, completely negating Deku's Danger Sense in the process, and unexpectedly confesses her love to him. She then asks him the same question she asked Ochaco during their previous encounter, and when Deku is unable to understand her way of love, she believes them both to be the same as her parents and decides to reject them and truly go on the offensive. After Tsuyu intervenes in the scuffle, Deku blasts his way off the island, trusting in Ochaco to handle things. Deku attempts to use the Second User's Quirk to get there faster, but is warned the power is too dangerous so to only use it as a last resort. Elsewhere in Kamino, Dabi is confronted by Shoto and the Flaming Sidekickers, disappointed not to see Endeavor. Shoto asks his brother why he never came home if he was still alive, and as his body starts to burn away, Dabi begins to reveal his origin.
146	8	"Two Flashfires"; Transliteration: "Futatsu no Kakushaku" (Japanese: 二つの赫灼)	Shōji Ikeno	Kō Matsuo	June 22, 2024	N/A
In a police station, Doctor Garaki reveals to an officer about how they collected "warped seeds" to use as potential vessels in case anything were to happen to Shigaraki, one of these being Toya, who All For One took after he burned himself alive at Sekoto Peak. Toya awoke at an orphanage three years later, learning that his body was not able to be fully repaired and cannot make full use of his fire again. Toya managed to escape, with the Doctor believing he would not last long, only to be surprised when he returned as Dabi years later. Meanwhile, Dabi explains to Shoto that after waking up he returned home in order to apologize, however upon witnessing Endeavor's abusive training towards Shoto, realized nothing has changed and decided to reject his past self and become Dabi. By studying Endeavor's Ultimate Moves, Dabi unleashes his fire on the battlefield haphazardly, all the while berating Shoto not making full use of his own abilities. Shoto then retaliates by utilizing his own Ultimate Move of his own creation, Flashfire Fist: Phosphor, a fusion of his hot and cold sides that is capable of putting out Dabi's heat. The two trade blows, with the Flaming Sidekickers taking a hit for Shoto while he has to charge back up, before Shoto is able to land a direct punch at Dabi, freezing everything in the vicinity, and incapacitating him.
147	9	"Extras"	Michiru Itabisashi	Akiko Ōtsuka	June 29, 2024	N/A
All Might and the Counter-Force announce to the rest of the Heroes of Dabi's defeat by Shoto. In Jaku, the Heroes led by Mt. Lady face off against the Paranormal Liberation Front attempting to break Gigantomachia out of his containment; Mina and Kirishima confront one of the commanders, who reveals himself to be Midnight's killer. Elsewhere, a gigantified Spinner, who had been given extra Quirks by All For One, leads an army of heteromorphs on Central Hospital in order to free Kurogiri; among the Heroes defending it are Present Mic, Shoji, and Koda. In Kamino, while the Heroes continue to clean up the remaining threats, sparks begin to glow in Dabi's stomach. In Gunga, Endeavor and Hawks face off against All For One in the skies, attempting to destroy his life support helmet, while aware he does not possess a Regeneration Quirk. During the scuffle, All For One reveals that he was responsible for Toya's disappearance, throwing Endeavor off enough for him to surprise attack and take him out of commission. Before All For One can blast Hawks, Tokoyami and Jiro arrive to disrupt the attack and help him. While Endeavor attempts to recover on the ground, Hawks reluctantly lets the two students assist in the fight. All For One becomes irritated by the "extras" that hang around One For All thinking they can face against him, and unleashes a devastating attack, blowing off one of Jiro's Earphone Jacks.
148	10	"Wounded Hero, Burning Bright and True!!"; Transliteration: "Shōshin Shōmei!! Teoi no Hīrō" (Japanese: 焼身照命!! 手負いのヒーロー)	Tsuyoshi Tobita	Tomo Ōkubo	July 13, 2024	2.3%
Despite the injury, Jiro retaliates against All For One with a sound wave attack. Before he can counter, suddenly the vestiges of All For One's Quirks start to rebel, leaving him unable to attack. Hawks and Tokoyami take advantage of this opening to destroy All For One's mask, however he regains control by consuming them and unleashes a hail of Rivet Stabs. The three are saved by a returning Endeavor, at the cost of his right arm. Endeavor proceeds to rampage against All For One, driving him into a corner, all the while he reflects upon his past, including how he was inspired to become a hero after watching his father die trying to save someone, and all he needs to do to atone for his actions. Endeavor seemingly finishes off All For One for good with a Prominence Burn, only for the body to slowly start regenerating. Meanwhile at the U.A. Coffin, the Heroes find themselves at a standstill against Shigaraki's never-ending finger swarm. Bakugo unveils his "Strafe Panzer" support item blasting his excess stock of Explosion sweat at point-blank range, which reverberates all throughout the Coffin. However, Shigaraki manages to brunt most of the damage and breaks Bakugo's arm, all the while continuing to mock him.
149	11	"Light Fades to Rain" (Note: Stylized in start case)	Shōji Ikeno	Akiko Ōtsuka	July 20, 2024	3.2%
Shigaraki continues to overwhelm Bakugo, intending to kill him as a "welcoming gift" for Deku. Eraser Head calls out for anyone else to help him, so Mirio, who had been assisting everyone inside the Coffin, appears to reunite with Tamaki and Nejire. The Big 3 proceed to rescue Bakugo and combat Shigaraki, with Mirio making a comment that the reason he hurts people is because he does not have any friends. This causes the vestige of Tenko Shimura to re-emerge, making All For One realize the body is not as melded together as he believed. Tamaki unleashes his Quirk at its fullest potential with the intention of destroying Shigaraki for good, but it still is not enough to thoroughly damage him. Despite his own injuries, Bakugo stands up and uses his incredible speed to counteract Shigaraki, enough to cause the villain to be visibly shaken, and be reminded of someone from his past. In a white void, Bakugo sees a vision of All Might, lamenting that he never got his autograph, just as Shigaraki lands a point-blank punch right to his heart. As rain begins to fall, the Heroes stare devastated at Bakugo's seemingly lifeless body.
150	12	"Those Who Defend, Those Who Violate"; Transliteration: "Fusegu Mono to Okasu Mono" (Japanese: 禦ぐ者と侵す者)	Masayuki Otsuki	Naomi Nakayama	August 3, 2024	2.8%
Shigaraki gloats to the devastated Heroes at Bakugo's supposed demise. Meanwhile in Kamino, Dabi reinvigorates himself by copying Shoto's Phosphor, resuming his rampage. He gets in contact with Skeptic to learn of Endeavor's location, who is in the process of hacking into both U.A., as well as the underground evacuation facility where the civilians are. In Gunga, All For One reveals that Doctor Garaki created a reverse-engineered duplicate of the Quirk-Destroying Drug, focused specifically on the effect of the original Rewind Quirk, regenerating All For One's body back into its prime state, at the cost of eventually rewinding out of existence. In America, the President gets into an argument with Commander Agpar about aligning themselves with Shigaraki in case Japan falls, greatly upsetting the latter. Back on U.A., Edgeshot uses his Quirk at its fullest power to enter himself into Bakugo's body, to repair his heart from the inside, though this may cost him his life. Shigaraki" is thrown into further distress between witnessing their attempts to save his life, and Mirko's assault on him, causing his body to rapidly transform into a defensive state covered in hands that knocks out almost everyone. With Jeanist and Mirio the only ones left standing, they hear from Mandalay that they need to keep Shigaraki busy for a few seconds to open the electric gate, and reminded of Nighteye's words, Mirio moons him, distracting him long enough for Deku to slingshot onto the battlefield and attack him.
151	13	"A Chain of Events, Across the Ages"; Transliteration: "Tsuranaru Seisō" (Japanese: 連なる星霜)	Tomo Ōkubo	Tomo Ōkubo	August 17, 2024	3.2%
On the way flying towards U.A., Deku receives assistance from the American military fleet to make it back in time, before entering and attacking Shigaraki. However, upon seeing Bakugo and the other Heroes' seemingly lifeless bodies, he goes into shock and his Quirks begin to rampage out of control. Shigaraki tries to take advantage of his enraged state to catch him off guard, but Mirio steps in to calm Deku down, telling him no one has died yet and they still have a chance at victory. Regaining his composure, Deku confronts All For One asking if Shigaraki is still there; the villain claims that he no longer exists and that they have melded together into a new being, but Mirio informs Deku of how unstable he had been reacting during the fight. Nana Shimura notices on Shigaraki's hand Kotaro's face, making them realize he is still there. Shigaraki attempts to attack Deku, but he counters by using The Second User's Quirk, Gearshift, allowing him to move faster than the speed of sound and completely overwhelm him. All For One in particular becomes perturbed by this revelation, remembering killing The Second User and how weak the Quirk was originally. Using the full power of One For All and its accompanying Quirks, Deku lands a devastating blow on Shigaraki, dealing massive damage inside and outside the body, before noticing the body begin to react unexpectedly. All For One internally declares all is not lost and they still have a chance at victory, while elsewhere, the gigantic Spinner continues his rampage.
152	14	"Together with Shoji"; Transliteration: "Shōji-kun to Issho." (Japanese: しょーじくんといっしょ。)	Shōji Ikeno	Shōji Ikeno	August 24, 2024	2.8%
Spinner and his army of heteromorphs, consisting of Paranormal Liberation Front members and civilians, continue to storm Central Hospital to free Kurogiri for All For One's goals, facing off against the Heroes and Police present. The Heroes are overwhelmed by their numbers, with the heteromorphs decrying them all for not understanding their plight. The hooded Liberation executive preaches to the crowd about the discrimination they have faced, and that they will use this time to make their voices finally heard, with Spinner as their hero. Right as Spinner is about to attack, Shoji knocks him back, only to be held down by the heteromorph army. Shoji asks them what attacking the Hospital has to do with their cause, reminding that the Heroes had evacuated the civilians during the Jaku incident, asking Spinner if they have a plan, as his scarred face is shown, to the peoples' surprise. However, Spinner's mind has grown more unstable, as a result of receiving two new Quirks from All For One, leaving him unable to properly respond and forcing the Liberation executive to improvise. While a further transformed Spinner battles Shoji, Koda recalls back to when Shoji revealed about his past to his friends at U.A., including how he received all his scars when he was a child whenever he came in contact with anyone in his town. Despite the pain he has dealt with, he holds onto the memory of when he used his Quirk to save a girl from drowning, and wants to use this memory to help overcome the prejudice ingrained in society. Shoji voices his opinion to the crowd about how else they can channel their rage, and when the Executive attempts to undercut his thoughts, Koda uses his newly enhanced Quirk to attack him by commanding birds, while also thinking about the prejudice his parents faced. Despite Shoji's cries, which the civilians begin to listen to, Spinner rejects it, repeating his call to action as he busts his way into the Hospital.
153	15	"Butterfly Effect"	Tsuyoshi Tobita	Tomo Ōkubo	August 31, 2024	5.1%
A group of heteromorphs follow Spinner into Central Hospital, however, upon seeing the doctors and nurses standing guard to defend it, they start to second guess themselves. Just as Shoji is about to get beaten by the army outside, one of the civilians step in, revealing his regrets and feelings about everything, and despite the Liberation soldiers attempting to further incite the incident, the rest of the civilians are convinced to halt the assault. Meanwhile, Spinner finds himself now all alone, reaching Kurogiri's containment location at the same time as Present Mic, who knocks him out with his Quirk. Before Mic can destroy the still inactive Kurogiri, believing Shirakumo to be gone, Spinner manages to use his remaining strength to give Kurogiri Shigaraki's remaining stuffed hand, pleading to help him, resulting in Kurogiri, now with Shirakumo's partially exposed face, to re-awaken. In America, a weather reporter notes the immense shift in the weather as a result of the intense heat signatures in Japan. In Kamino, just as Dabi is about to fly towards Endeavor's location himself, he is swallowed up by a Warp Gate. On the U.A. Coffin, while Aizawa and Monoma continue to use Erasure on Shigaraki, Kurogiri and Mic suddenly warp behind them. In Gunga, Dabi appears through the Warp Gate, greeting his father, alongside a Toga-transformed Twice, to Hawks' horror. During the battle on Okuto Island, Toga managed to swallow Twice's blood to transform into him, just as Kurogiri arrives to warp her to Hawks' location; Ochaco attempts to call out to Toga to talk, but she says it is too late. Toga proceeds to use Twice's Sad Man's Parade, swarming Gunga with Infinite Doubles.
154	16	"The Chain Thus Far"; Transliteration: "Koko ni Itaru Made no Tsuranari" (Japanese: ここに至るまでの連なり)	Hyūga Yamamura	Takafumi Hino & Hyūga Yamamura	September 7, 2024	3.1%
Ochaco and Tsuyu manage to follow Toga through the Warp Gate before it closes, reuniting with Tokoyami and Jiro as the Heroes attempt to flee the Infinite Double swarm. All For One attempts to use Toga and Dabi's assault as a distraction to escape, but Hawks stands in his way, deducing he needs to make his way back to Shigaraki. Endeavor faces off against the rampaging Dabi, in an effort to finally see his son. On the U.A. Coffin, the Doubles swarm Aizawa and Monoma, undoing Erasure's effect, and causing Shigaraki to explode. U.A. suddenly begins to fall as a result of Skeptic hacking into their system. Deku is forced to recover due to overusing Gearshift and faces down against Shigaraki, whose real personality has re-emerged. Just then, Skeptic is counter-hacked by La Brava, revealed to be working with the Counter-Force; before he can escape he is captured by several Heroes, due to her leaking his location. While the Heroes inside and outside U.A. try to deal with the Doubles, they then receive assistance from Gentle. It is revealed during All For One's prison assaults, Gentle single-handedly was able to prevent all the criminals from his prison from escaping, earning him the trust of the Police Force. Empowered by La Brava's Quirk, Gentle uses his Quirk to halt U.A.'s descent. Shigaraki is nearly about to use his Quirk on the Coffin, but his hand is sniped off by Lady Nagant.
155	17	"Hopes" (Note: Stylized in all lowercase)	Tomo Ōkubo	Tomo Ōkubo	September 14, 2024	2.9%
While everyone is being evacuated into Central Hospital, a still injured Lady Nagant emerges, wanting to assist Deku, so Rock Lock gives her information about the battles, allowing her to use her remaining strength to snipe Shigaraki at from afar. Inside the vestige realm, All For One hysterically attempts to regain control, but Shigaraki retaliates, revealing that he is aware of his Master grooming his hatred to use him as a pawn. Consuming the vestige in fingers, Shigaraki's true self fully resurfaces, declaring his intention to destroy everything stemming from his childhood home, which is the only thing that will save him. With his Quirks now active, Deku pushes himself and Shigaraki out of U.A. onto the ground to finish their fight. As Gentle continues to hold up U.A., he notices the Business Course students filming everything, leading La Brava to hack into their phones and start live streaming the footage. Kurogiri, who has become increasingly confused due to Shirakumo's influence, notices Aizawa and Present Mic getting knocked off by the Doubles, and seemingly saves them by warping the three of them away. Meanwhile in Gunga, Hawks gives chase to All For One, trying to reach Shigaraki's location to complete the transfer. The Heroes then receive assistance from the Shiketsu High School students, subduing the Doubles and assaulting All For One. The Villain overwhelms them with his powers, but is suddenly caught off guard by Tokoyami, using Dark Shadow at his fullest power, to completely pummel All For One into the ground. At the same time in the Double swarm, Toga attempts to transform into the other League members but is unable to use their Quirks, causing her to fall into despair wondering why she cannot fully become Twice.
156	18	"It's a Small World"	Shōji Ikeno	Shōji Ikeno	September 21, 2024	2.8%
Ochaco manages to spot the real Toga by noticing her crying. Meanwhile, Tokoyami and the Heroes continue their pounding on All For One, only to be blown back by the Villain now looking visibly younger. As All For One attempts to once again flee, Gigantomachia suddenly appears, but to his surprise is attacked by the beast who throws a chunk of the mountain at him. 15 minutes prior, the Paranormal Liberation Front succeeded in awakening Gigantomachia, forcing the Heroes on the defensive. Kirishima goes to retrieve Shinso to use his Brainwashing on Machia, but finds him consumed by the Sludge Villain. Mina pushes her Acid Quirk to the limit, saving Mt. Lady by damaging Machia and defeating the Sludge Villain. Shinso brainwashes Machia, turning the tide on the Villains, while Kirishima thanks Mina, calling her his hero. They then learn about All For One's attempted escape and join in on the assault. All For One attacks Machia to break Shinso's brainwashing spell, however Machia vents about his frustration at being left behind by his Master once again, and chooses to continue attacking All For One. At the same time, two news reporters, inspired by the live stream of Deku's fight, make their way to Gunga to record the battles, as all over the world people are watching the events unfold. Eventually All For One gets the upper hand, kills Machia and absolutely devastates everyone else. He steals Hawks' Quirk and intends to take Tokoyami's Quirk, but Mineta uses his remaining strength to beg him not to, this "howling of the weak" leading All For One to leave and berate the Heroes' failure.
157	19	"I Am Here"	Masayuki Otsuki	Motonobu Hori	September 28, 2024	3.8%
One of the underground evacuation blocks between U.A. and Shiketsu is disrupted by All For One's spies, forcing the Heroes to help the civilians escape. The Counter-Force then realize that Dabi is on the verge of an implosion that will incinerate everything within a 5 kilometer radius, including the block nearby. With All For One rapidly approaching Shigaraki's location, Tsukauchi laments over there being no one else for backup to stop either threat, when he receives a call from All Might. In Kamino, Shoto voices his own regrets being unable to stop Dabi, when he and Ida are called upon by All Might to make their way to Gunga to stop the explosion, believing in the both of them. Ida uses his Quirk to blast him and Shoto across the city, with Stain watching them in the shadows. Elsewhere, despite Tsukauchi's worrying cries, All Might confronts All For One alone in the streets, unveiling several support items from his briefcase, including a suit of powered armor. In Gunga, the civilians, Rei, Natsuo, and Fuyumi among them, manage to escape the crumbling evacuation blocks, witnessing Dabi's intense heat sphere. Inside, Endeavor is unable to lure Dabi away any further, while the villain has nearly lost his mind due to overusing his Quirk. Endeavor then realizes that Dabi managed to create Phosphor by manifesting Rei's ice Quirk within him, recognizing his faults that led them both to this point. He prepares to sacrifice himself and Dabi by blasting themselves into the air, but is halted by Rei, Fuyumi, and Natsuo, who use their ice Quirks in an attempt to cool them both down. As the family is reunited, Dabi thinks about how they all are finally watching him, realizing what he is always wanted. As everyone watches the live streams anxiously, Shoto and Ida make their way to the blast zone on an Engine-powered Ice jet, and before Dabi explodes, Shoto unleashes his Great Glacial Aegir, completely neutralizing the fire. Endeavor grievously apologizes to Dabi's barely alive body and the rest of his family for all of his mistakes.
158	20	"A Girl's Ego"; Transliteration: "Shōjo no Ego" (Japanese: 少女のエゴ)	Tsuyoshi Tobita	Tensai Okamura	October 5, 2024	3.4%
Toga and her Double swarm continue to overwhelm the Heroes, as the increasing numbers threaten to extend further outside the forest. Ochaco manages to reach the real Toga with her cable, calling out to her that she wants to talk, but she once again reiterates that its too late. When Ochaco mentions that she has been mixing in her feelings with bloodlust, it causes Toga to respond angrily and try to attack an injured Tsuyu. Toga recalls back to her childhood, being constantly lambasted by her parents for her attempts to be "normal", and being unable to fit in to those around her. Ochaco manages to pull Toga toward her, just as the Heroes begin to notice the Doubles starting to transform into the other Heroes after drinking their blood on the battlefield, making cooperation now impossible. As Tsuyu pleads for Toga to hear Ochaco out, Toga stabs Ochaco in the abdomen. She then recalls back to her time with the League, when they asked if she wanted a "Villain Name", and she declares she does not because she wants to live her life as "Himiko Toga". Even after the Double swarm consumes all the Heroes, and gravely injured, Ochaco still tries to reach out to Toga, admitting that she wants to understand why she cried and that she is jealous of her smile, causing Toga to become emotionally overwhelmed. Ochaco then undergoes a Quirk Awakening, using her Zero Gravity to make all the Doubles and Heroes float in the air. She is able to reach out to Toga once again, revealing why she wanted to be a hero and how she fell for Izuku, and just as Toga is about to tearfully stab Ochaco once more, she stops and finally admits all her own feelings, forced by everyone to repress herself and just wanted to live her life. Ochaco tells Toga she is "the cutest in the world", causing her to tearfully smile, as all the Doubles fade away into the sky.
159	21	"Battle Without a Quirk"; Transliteration: ""Kosei" Naki Tatakai" (Japanese: "個性"無き戦い)	Tomo Ōkubo	Tomo Ōkubo	October 12, 2024	3.2%
After the Double swarm completely vanishes, Toga stands above the barely conscious Ochaco, on the verge of death after overusing her Quirk despite her serious injuries. Unable to let her die, Toga swallows some of Ochaco's blood to partially Transform into her, allowing her to perform a blood transfusion to save her life, wanting to prove her feelings are genuine. Ochaco tries to tell Toga to stop, knowing that if she gives up all her blood she will die, but Toga insists she will do as she pleases. She apologizes for hurting her and tearfully thanks her for everything and making her happy, wondering what could have been if she felt these feelings earlier. Ochaco falls unconscious and Toga peacefully dies, the latter thinking about how she was able to live her life as a "normal girl". Meanwhile, All Might confronts All For One, unveiling a mechanical suit dubbed the "Armored All Might". All For One becomes enraged at All Might's presence and haphazardly begins attacking, which All Might is able to counter using a series of support items on his suit, named after the students of Class 1-A. During the battle, All Might remembers when he first met Nana Shimura, asking to be her disciple. He tells her his desire to become a Symbol that people can look towards to help them smile, to carry that burden as someone who's Quirkless. All For One eventually gains the upperhand and seriously injures All Might, but remembering his words to Deku, stands tall and manically laughs, intending to keep the still rewinding All For One focused on him. At the same time, Deku continues his struggle against Shigaraki, as he senses All Might's drastic battle.

== Recap specials ==
No. overall	No. in season	Title	Directed by (Note: Production staff information is taken from the ending credits of each recap special)	Storyboarded by	Animation directed by	Original release date	Viewership rating
138.5.1	SP–1	"Izuku Midoriya: Resolve"; Transliteration: "Midoriya Izuku: Maindo" (Japanese: 緑谷出久：Mind)	Hyūga Yamamura	10Gauge, Nobutaka Yoda & Atsushi Kobayashi	Takashi Murai	April 6, 2024	3.5%
A recap special featuring Izuku Midoriya's meeting with All Might and the origin of One For All.
138.5.2	SP–2	"Toshinori Yagi: Embers"; Transliteration: "Yagi Toshinori: Enbāzu" (Japanese: 八木俊典：Embers)	Hyūga Yamamura	10Gauge, Nobutaka Yoda & Atsushi Kobayashi	Tsunenori Saitō	April 13, 2024	2.8%
A recap special featuring the former #1 Hero All Might, and the embers of One For All during the events about his arch-nemesis All For One.
138.5.3	SP–3	"Heroes: Convictions"; Transliteration: "Hīrōzu: Sōtsu" (Japanese: ヒーローズ：Thoughts)	Hyūga Yamamura	10Gauge, Nobutaka Yoda & Atsushi Kobayashi	Tsunenori Saitō	April 20, 2024	3.3%
A recap special featuring Ochaco Uraraka in her previous encounters against Himiko Toga and the Todoroki Family's conflict, including Shoto Todoroki's "first" encounter with Dabi.
138.5.4	SP–4	"Tomura Shigaraki: Destruction"; Transliteration: "Shigaraki Tomura: Desutorakushon" (Japanese: 死柄木弔：Destruction)	Hyūga Yamamura	10Gauge, Nobutaka Yoda & Atsushi Kobayashi	Tsunenori Saitō & Miho Katō	April 27, 2024	3.2%
A recap special featuring Tomura Shigaraki's origins and his rise to power in becoming All For One's successor.

== Home media release ==
=== Japanese ===
Toho Animation released the seventh season on Blu-ray and DVD in three volumes in Japan, with the first volume released on July 17, 2024, and the final volume released on December 18, 2024.

Toho Animation (Japan – Region 2/A)
Volume	Episodes	Release date	Ref.
1	139–145	July 17, 2024	
2	146–152	October 16, 2024	
3	153–159	December 18, 2024	

=== English ===
Crunchyroll released the first part of the seventh season on home media on June 17, 2025, while the second part was released on November 18, 2025.

Crunchyroll, LLC (North America – Region 1/A)
Part		Episodes	Release date	Ref.
Season 7	1	139–150	June 17, 2025	
Season 7	2	151–159	November 18, 2025	

Madman Entertainment (Australia and New Zealand – Region 4/B)
Part		Episodes	Release date	Ref.
Season 7	1	139–150	August 6, 2025	
Season 7	2	151–159	January 7, 2026	
