= My Hero Academia season 1 =

First season of My Hero Academia

My Hero Academia
- Season 1
- Cover art of the first Blu-ray volume of the first season released by Toho on June 29, 2016
- No. of episodes: 13

Release
- Original network: MBS
- Original release: April 3 – June 26, 2016

Season chronology
- Next → Season 2

The first season of the My Hero Academia anime television series was produced by Bones and directed by Kenji Nagasaki, with Yōsuke Kuroda handling series composition, Yoshihiko Umakoshi providing character designs and Yuki Hayashi composed the music. The season adapts Kōhei Horikoshi's original My Hero Academia manga series from the 1st volume through the beginning of the 3rd volume. It covers the first story arcs (chapters 1–21) of the series and aired from April 3 to June 26, 2016, on MBS in Japan.

My Hero Academia is set in a world where about 80% of the human population has gained the ability to develop superpowers called "Quirks" (個性, Kosei), after a mysterious glowing child appeared in Japan. The story follows the adventures of Izuku Midoriya, a boy who dreams of becoming a superhero himself despite being Quirkless. He is scouted by the world's greatest hero, All Might, who bestows his Quirk to Midoriya after recognizing his potential, and helps to enroll him in a prestigious high school for superheroes in training.

The season was released on DVD and Blu-ray in five compilations, each containing two to three episodes, by Toho between June 29 and October 12, 2016. Funimation licensed the series for an English dubbed release in North America and released the episodes in a single DVD and Blu-Ray compilation on April 18, 2017. FunimationNow, Crunchyroll and Hulu are streaming the series outside of Asia. Animax Asia is simulcasting the series in the same day it airs. Eventually, their adaptation ran from May 5 to August 4, 2018, on Adult Swim as part of its Toonami programming block.

Two pieces of theme music are used for this season: an opening theme and an ending theme. The opening theme is "The Day", performed by Porno Graffitti and the ending theme is "Heroes", performed by Brian the Sun.

== Episodes ==
No. overall	No. in season	Title	Directed by (Note: Information is taken from the ending credits of each episode.)	Storyboarded by	Original release date	English air date
1	1	"Izuku Midoriya: Origin"; Transliteration: "Midoriya Izuku: Orijin" (Japanese: 緑谷出久：オリジン)	Takurō Tsukada	Kenji Nagasaki	April 3, 2016	May 5, 2018
In a world where most of the population is gifted with special powers known as "Quirks", Izuku Midoriya is a young boy who always dreamed of becoming a hero, despite not having a Quirk himself, until one day he is attacked by a villain made of sludge and is rescued by none other than All Might, the best hero in the world and his idol since childhood. After seeing Izuku is safe, All Might starts leaving with the villain in his custody, but Izuku grabs onto his leg and ends up flying with him. After All Might lands on the rooftop of a building, Izuku asks if someone who does not have a Quirk could also be a hero like him.
2	2	"What It Takes to Be a Hero"; Transliteration: "Hīrō no Jōken" (Japanese: ヒーローの条件)	Daisuke Tsukushi	Kenji Nagasaki	April 10, 2016	May 12, 2018
Izuku discovers that All Might's true form is that of a frail, emaciated man who suffered a massive respiratory injury 5 years ago, preventing him from using his powers for longer than 3 hours a day. All Might tells Izuku that he should give up on being a hero and focus on a more realistic dream. Disheartened, Izuku makes his way home, only to see his classmate and bully Katsuki Bakugo attacked by the same sludge villain that All Might captured, who escaped when Izuku latched onto All Might. With no heroes around able to fight the villain, Izuku rushes in to help Bakugo by instinct. The Sludge Villain recovers and attempts to attack Izuku, but All Might saves him and Bakugo then defeating the villain with only a singular powerful attack. All Might meets up with Izuku again and tells that he can become a hero, bringing Izuku to tears.
3	3	"Roaring Muscles"; Transliteration: "Unare kin'niku" (Japanese: うなれ筋肉)	Yoshifumi Sasahara	Katsumi Terahigashi	April 17, 2016	May 19, 2018
All Might tells Izuku of his Quirk, "One For All", a sacred torch that transfers its strength from person to person, increasing its strength each time it is passed. While All Might believes Izuku to be worthy of his Quirk, bestowing it to him right away would ruin his untrained body. All Might then designs a ten-month training regimen to ensure that Izuku can become a vessel that can carry it. After ten months of intense training, Izuku's body becomes more refined and muscular, with All Might now deeming him a worthy successor for One for All. All Might gives Izuku a piece of his hair to eat, to transfer his Quirk to Izuku through his DNA.
4	4	"Start Line"; Transliteration: "Sutaato Rain" (Japanese: スタートライン)	Masato Miyoshi	Tōru Yoshida	April 24, 2016	June 2, 2018 (Note: Episode 4 was delayed due to Adult Swim airing a FLCL marathon on May 26, 2018.)
After receiving All Might's Quirk, Izuku attends the exams for the prestigious U.A. High School for heroes in training. Izuku's lack of experience causes him to quickly fall behind the others until one of his fellow examinees, Ochaco Uraraka, finds herself in serious danger and he runs to her rescue. He manages to use One For All to unleash a powerful punch that instantly destroys the giant machine, but the sheer power of the attack also breaks his arm in the process. One week later, Izuku receives his examination results from All Might, who will be the new teacher in U.A. High. The latter showing the video of Ochaco asking one of the teachers, Present Mic, to give her points to Izuku because he saved her. Despite Izuku scoring zero points on the practical, he scored 60 rescue points which gives more than enough to pass the exam and enrolls to U.A. High.
5	5	"What I Can Do For Now"; Transliteration: "Ima Boku ni Dekiru Koto wo" (Japanese: 今 僕に出来ることを)	Satoshi Nakagawa	Katsuyuki Kodera	May 1, 2016	June 9, 2018
Izuku begins his first day at U.A as a member of Class 1-A along with Bakugo and Ochaco. The homeroom teacher, Shota Aizawa, holds a physical test to evaluate how the students use their Quirks, threatening to expel the worst ranked student. Unable to use his Quirk more than once without breaking his bones again, Izuku only has one shot to get a good score during the pitching test. He throws his pitch, and at the last second, he concentrates One For All through his fingertips. The explosive throw gives him a high score, only breaks the bone in his finger, and impresses not only his classmates, but his teacher and All Might as well.
6	6	"Rage, You Damn Nerd"; Transliteration: "Takere Kusonādo" (Japanese: 猛れクソナード)	Takurō Tsukada	Kō Matsuo	May 8, 2016	June 16, 2018
The Quirk Apprehension Test ends with Izuku ranked last, However, Aizawa reveals the expulsion rule was a ruse to bring out the best in the class, much to the students' shock. The next day, Class 1-A undergoes their Hero Basic Training class where All Might is the teacher. Now donning their own hero costumes, the students are assigned to a mock battle between teams of two to test their combat abilities. Izuku is paired with Ochaco, who he has since befriended and his opponents are Tenya Ida and Bakugo, with the latter enraged after learning Izuku has now suddenly got a Quirk. Bakugo immediately attacks Izuku when the exercise begins but is shocked when his attack is predicted and countered by him. Izuku tells his bully that he is no longer the weak and defenseless "Deku" he always mocked.
7	7	"Deku vs. Kacchan"; Transliteration: "Deku bāsasu Kacchan" (Japanese: デクvsかっちゃん)	Geisei Morita	Takayuki Tanaka	May 15, 2016	June 23, 2018
A flashback shows that "Deku" and "Kacchan" grew up in the same neighborhood and have known each other since they were little kids. Bakugo was always surrounded by praise for his innately powerful explosion Quirk, causing him to always feel superior to everyone around him. However Izuku still never treated Bakugo like he was better, and even tried to help him after he fell into a river. Bakugo only took this as an insult, like Izuku, despite being Quirkless, was looking down on him. That same anger has carried over years later into the Battle Trial. The mock battle continues with Izuku barely holding against Bakugo's devastating attacks, leaving Ochaco to face Ida by herself. Unable to win against Bakugo, Izuku uses his Quirk to redirect one of Bakugo's explosions to destroy the area Ida is in, incapacitating him and allowing Ochaco to win the battle by capturing the bomb.
8	8	"Bakugo's Start Line"; Transliteration: "Sutāto Rain, Bakugō no." (Japanese: スタートライン、爆豪の。)	Yoshifumi Sasahara	Satomi Nakamura	May 22, 2016	June 30, 2018
As Izuku is taken to the nurse's office to heal, Bakugo watches the rest of his classmates battles and becomes intimidated by how strong some of his peers Quirks are. After recovering from his injuries, Izuku attempts to cheer him up, to the point of sharing parts of his secret with Bakugo. However, Bakugo refuses to believe him and responds by admitting defeat. Before storming off, he warns Izuku that he is just getting started, and will not lose again. All Might arrives to console Bakugo again, but Bakugo refused and promised to surpass the number one hero without his help. Meanwhile, news that All Might is teaching at U.A. are received by some individuals with contempt.
9	9	"Yeah, Just Do Your Best, Ida!"; Transliteration: "Ii zo Ganbare Īda-kun!" (Japanese: いいぞガンバレ飯田くん！)	Masashi Abe	Katsuyuki Kodera	May 29, 2016	July 7, 2018
During Class 1-A's homeroom class, Mr. Aizawa announces that the class needs to elect a representative which gives a chance for students to gain extra recognition. Much to his surprise, Izuku is chosen as the class president by popularity, but he ends up relinquishing the position to Ida when he and his friends find him more suitable for the position. Class 1-A is assigned to another field exercise where they meet the famous rescue hero Thirteen. She greets them and shows the students around her facility, the U.S.J. (Unforeseen Simulation Joint), But shortly after explaining the exercises, a horde of villains known as the "League of Villains" suddenly appear through a black portal before them.
10	10	"Encounter with the Unknown"; Transliteration: "Michi to no Sōgū" (Japanese: 未知との遭遇)	Takurō Tsukada	Shinji Ishihira	June 5, 2016	July 14, 2018
The Warp Villain, Kurogiri, uses his powers to scatter the students throughout the facility in order for the other villains to ambush them to attract the attention of All Might for a trap. Izuku ends up stranded in underwater and surrounded on a ship along with his classmates Tsuyu Asui and Minoru Mineta. Despite being heavily outnumbered, the three coordinate their powers to defeat the vilains and escape the area. At U.A. in the nurse's office, All Might tries to contact Thirteen and Aizawa but is unable to. Despite already surpassing his 3 hour limit for the day, All Might plans to go to the U.S.J. in hero form to investigate. Elsewhere, Ida is chosen by the others to break through the enemy trap and call for help.
11	11	"Game Over"; Transliteration: "Gēmu Ōbā" (Japanese: ゲームオーバー)	Takahiro Natori	Takahiro Natori	June 12, 2016	July 21, 2018
As the students continue to fight for their lives against the League of Villains, both teachers are defeated by the strongest amongst the villains. Ida eventually manages to escape with his friends' help to call for backup from U.A. Knowing that their group cannot fight off reinforcements, the villains plan to retreat. Before beginning their escape, the League of Villains' leader Tomura Shigaraki attempts to kill the nearby Izuku, Tsuyu and Mineta but is interrupted by the appearance of All Might himself.
12	12	"All Might"; Transliteration: "Ōru Maito" (Japanese: オールマイト)	Tsuyoshi Tobita, Hakuyu Go	Tōru Yoshida, Hakuyu Go	June 19, 2016	July 28, 2018
After All Might's arrival at U.S.J., Shigaraki unleashes his secret weapon, the Multi-Quirk monster called "Nomu" against All Might, who finds himself struggling to inflict any substantial damage on the monster. All Might pushes himself beyond his limits to overwhelm Nomu's Shock Absorption and Regeneration Quirks with numerous rapid full power attacks until he is launched outside the facility and knocked out much to the students awe. He declares that the League of Villains are finished, much to the displeasure of Shigaraki.
13	13	"In Each of Our Hearts"; Transliteration: "Onoono no Mune ni" (Japanese: 各々の胸に)	Tomo Ōkubo	Katsuyuki Kodera	June 26, 2016	August 4, 2018
Although he was able to defeat the Nomu, All Might has no energy left and is defenseless against Shigaraki, but Izuku manages to stall the enemy long enough for the other teachers to arrive and force him and Kurogiri to retreat. As the leftover villains are captured and the students are rescued, All Might thanks Izuku for saving his life but warns that fighting past his limit has reduced his power limit to only an hour a day. Shigaraki confers with his master, implying that their feud against the Heroes is just the beginning. Later at night, Izuku has been recovered and released from Recovery Girl's infirmary with his wounds treated. He finds Ochaco and Ida waiting outside the school and walks with them. Elsewhere, an unidentified figure standing on a rooftop stares down at the city.

== Home video release ==
=== Japanese ===
Toho released the series on DVD and Blu-ray in five volumes in Japan, with the first volume released on June 29, 2016, and the final volume released on October 12, 2016.

Toho Animation (Japan – Region 2/A)
Volume	Episodes	Release date	Ref.
1	1–3	June 29, 2016	
2	4–6	July 13, 2016	
3	7–9	August 17, 2016	
4	10–11	September 14, 2016	
5	12–13	October 12, 2016	

=== English ===
The series was released in North America by Funimation, who released a limited edition combo set, a standard combo set, and a DVD set on April 18, 2017. The Blu-ray/DVD set was also released as a complete set in the same day. Funimation also released the series in Australia and New Zealand through Universal Sony Pictures Home Entertainment, where it received a limited edition combo release. Universal Sony later released standard editions of the DVD and Blu-ray in Australia and New Zealand on August 15, 2018. Funimation later released the series in Australia and New Zealand via Madman Entertainment, with the combo edition released on December 4, 2019. In the United Kingdom and Ireland, Funimation distributed the limited edition combo release through Universal Pictures UK on May 15, 2017, and the standard edition DVD and Blu-ray through Manga Entertainment on June 10, 2019.

Funimation (North America – Region 1/A)
Part		Episodes	Release date	Ref.
Season 1	Limited Edition	1–13	April 18, 2017	
Season 1	Standard Edition	1–13	April 18, 2017	
Season 1	Complete	1–13	April 18, 2017	

Universal Pictures UK (Limited Edition) / Manga Entertainment (Standard Edition) (United Kingdom and Ireland – Region 2/B)
Part		Episodes	Release date	Ref.
Season 1	Limited Edition	1–13	May 15, 2017	
Season 1	Standard Edition	1–13	June 10, 2019	

Universal Sony / Madman Entertainment (Australia and New Zealand – Region 4/B)
Part		Episodes	Release date	Ref.
Season 1	Limited Edition	1–13	May 17, 2017	
Season 1	Standard Edition	1–13	August 15, 2018 (Universal Sony); December 4, 2019 (Madman)	

== Reception ==
The U.S. ratings for the first season of My Hero Academia during its Toonami broadcast run.

Viewership and ratings per episode of My Hero Academia season 1
No.	Title	Air date	Viewers (millions)	DVR viewers (millions)	Total viewers (millions)	Ref.
1	"Izuku Midoriya: Origin"	May 5, 2018	0.718	TBD	TBD	
2	"What It Takes to Be a Hero"	May 12, 2018	0.578	TBD	TBD	
3	"Roaring Muscles"	May 19, 2018	0.554	TBD	TBD	
4	"Start Line"	June 2, 2018	0.608	TBD	TBD	
5	"What I Can Do For Now"	June 9, 2018	0.520	TBD	TBD	
6	"Rage, You Damned Nerd"	June 16, 2018	0.720	TBD	TBD	
7	"Deku vs. Kacchan"	June 23, 2018	0.661	TBD	TBD	
8	"Bakugo's Start Line"	June 30, 2018	0.601	TBD	TBD	
9	"Yeah, Just Do Your Best, Iida!"	July 7, 2018	0.560	TBD	TBD	
10	"Encounter with the Unknown"	July 14, 2018	0.497	TBD	TBD	
11	"Game Over"	July 21, 2018	0.537	TBD	TBD	
12	"All Might"	July 28, 2018	0.564	TBD	TBD	
13	"In Each of our Hearts"	August 4, 2018	0.504	TBD	TBD	
