= List of My Hero Academia chapters =

Cover of the first tankōbon, released in Japan by Shueisha on November 4, 2014

My Hero Academia is a Japanese manga series written and illustrated by Kōhei Horikoshi. The story is set in a world where most of the world population has superhuman abilities known as "Quirks". The protagonist Izuku Midoriya is a teenage boy who was born without a Quirk, despite his longtime dream to be a superhero, until he is approached by All Might, the most famous hero in Japan and the world and also his childhood idol, who chooses him to inherit his Quirk "One For All" and helps to enroll him in a prestigious high school for superheroes in training.

My Hero Academia began its serialization in the manga magazine Weekly Shōnen Jump on July 7, 2014. The series ended after a ten-year run on August 5, 2024. Its chapters were collected and published by Shueisha into 42 individual tankōbon volumes, released from November 4, 2014, to December 4, 2024. The series is licensed for English-language release in North America by Viz Media, who published the first volume on August 4, 2015. As the series is published in Japan, it is also released simultaneously in English digitally by Viz Media's Weekly Shonen Jump and later its website. Additionally, the first 20 volumes within a box set of the series was released by Viz Media on October 18, 2022, while the final 22 volumes is set to be released on November 24, 2026.

Three spin-off manga series have also been released. The first, My Hero Academia: Smash!! by Hirofumi Neda, is a comedy manga which ran in the Shōnen Jump+ digital app from November 9, 2015, to November 6, 2017. Its chapters were collected in five tankōbon volumes. The second spin-off manga, My Hero Academia: Vigilantes, is a prequel to the main series written by Hideyuki Furuhashi and illustrated by Betten Court, which ran from August 20, 2016, to May 28, 2022. Its chapters were collected in 15 tankōbon volumes. The third spin-off manga, My Hero Academia: Team-Up Missions by Yōkō Akiyama, features various side stories. It began serialization in Saikyō Jump on August 2, 2019, with a prologue chapter debuting in Jump GIGA on July 25, 2019; the series ended on January 4, 2025.

== Volumes ==
No.	Title	Original release date	English release date
1	Izuku Midoriya: Origin; Midoriya Izuku: Orijin (緑谷出久：オリジン)	November 4, 2014; 978-4-08-880264-0	August 4, 2015; 978-1-4215-8269-6
1. "Izuku Midoriya: Origin" (緑谷出久：オリジン, Midoriya Izuku: Orijin); 2. "Roaring Muscles" (うなれ筋肉, Unare Kinniku); 3. "Entrance Exam" (入試, Nyūshi); 4. "Starting Line" (スタート ライン, Sutāto Rain); 5. "Smashing into Academia" (はりさけろ入学, Harisakero Nyūgaku); 6. "What I Can Do For Now" (今 僕に出来ることを, Ima, Boku ni Dekiru Koto o); 7. "Costume Change?" (服着よう？, Fuku Kiyō?)
In a world where 80% of the world's population has superpowers known as "Quirks", a Quirkless young boy named Izuku Midoriya, dreams of becoming a hero like his idol All Might and attending the prestigious U.A High School for Heroes. Izuku is bullied and cruelly nicknamed "Deku" by his childhood friend Katsuki "Kacchan" Bakugo, who is constantly praised for his powerful "Explosion" Quirk. All Might, who for years had been suffering from debilitating injuries, witnesses Izuku attempt to save Bakugo on his own from a sludge villain, and chooses Izuku to inherit his Quirk "One For All". Izuku trains for ten months to withstand One For All and passes the U.A. entrance exams by saving Ochaco Uraraka, a girl with a gravity manipulation Quirk who spins the "Deku" nickname into a positive definition. Izuku, Bakugo, and Ochaco are placed in Shota "Eraser Head" Aizawa's Class 1-A. Despite his training, Izuku still damages his body when using One For All. Class 1-A changes to their Hero costumes for a combat class headed by the newest teacher, All Might.
2	Rage, You Damned Nerd; Takere Kuso Nādo (猛れクソナード)	January 5, 2015; 978-4-08-880297-8	November 3, 2015; 978-1-4215-8270-2
8. "Rage, You Damned Nerd" (猛れクソナード, Takere Kuso Nādo); 9. "Deku vs. Kacchan" (デクvsかっちゃん); 10. "Breaking Bakugo" (折れろ爆豪, Orero Bakugō); 11. "Bakugo's Starting Line" (スタートライン、爆豪の。, Sutāto Rain, Bakugō no.); 12. "Yeah, Just Do Your Best, Ida!" (いいぞガンバレ飯田くん！, Ii zo Ganbare Iida-kun!); 13. "Rescue Training" (救助訓れ, Kyūjo Kunre); 14. "Encounter with the Unknown" (未知との遭遇, Michi to no Sōgū); 15. "Vs." (VS, Bui Esu); 16. "Know Your Enemies" (思い知れ敵, Omoishire Teki); 17. "Game Over" (ゲームオーバー, Gēmu Ōbā)
Class 1-A are assigned to a combat training battle between teams of two. Izuku is paired with Ochaco against Tenya Ida and Bakugo; Izuku stands up to Bakugo, and Ochaco secures victory for her team. Bakugo realizes he has a long way to go after seeing Shoto Todoroki easily win his match, while Izuku becomes popular among Class 1-A. Ida becomes the class representative and Momo Yaoyorozu is elected vice class representative. Class 1-A are assigned to another field exercise at the Unforeseen Simulation Joint (USJ) which is interrupted by the League of Villains, led by Tomura Shigaraki. Many of the students are scattered throughout the USJ by Shigaraki's second-in-command Kurogiri; Izuku is sent to a shipwreck zone with Tsuyu Asui and Minoru Mineta, Yaoyorozu is sent to a mountain zone with Denki Kaminari and Kyoka Jiro, and Bakugo is sent to a ruins zone with Eijiro Kirishima. Ida escapes to find help, and Aizawa is wounded by a monster called a "Nomu" before All Might comes to everyone's aid.
3	All Might; Ōru Maito (オールマイト)	April 3, 2015; 978-4-08-880335-7	February 2, 2016; 978-1-4215-8510-9
18. "Heroes Counterattack" (逆襲のヒーローズ, Gyakushū no Hīrōzu); 19. "All Might" (オールマイト, Ōru Maito); 20. "The World of Pros" (プロの世界, Puro no Sekai); 21. "In Each of Our Hearts" (各々の胸に, Onoono no Mune ni); 22. "That's the Idea, Ochako" (そういうことねお茶子さん, Sōiu Koto ne Ochako-san); 23. "Roaring Sports Festival" (うなれ体育祭, Unare Taiikusai); 24. "Mad Dash and Knockdown" (駆け上がれ蹴落として, Kakeagare Keotoshite); 25. "In Their Own Quirky Ways" (みんな個性的でいいね, Minna Kosei-teki de Ii ne); 26. "Chase Down the Leader" (立て追われる身, Esu-tate Owareru Mi)
Shigaraki pits All Might against the Nomu; Izuku leaves Tsuyu and Mineta while they are escorting Aizawa to save All Might from Shigaraki, while Bakugo, Kirishima, and Shoto arrive and help wound the Nomu. All Might barely manages to defeat the Nomu as the other teachers arrive. Shigaraki and Kurogiri are forced to flee, informed by their benefactor that their war against the heroes has only just begun. As U.A. prepares to hold its annual Sports Festival, All Might reveals that the residual traces of his Quirk are diminishing while telling Izuku that the festival is an opportunity for him to show his true value to the world. Shoto declares that he intends to defeat Izuku. U.A. teachers Midnight and Present Mic host the Sports Festival, which begins as the students from the four branches of the school – Hero, General Studies, Business and Support Courses – participate in an obstacle course race.
4	The Boy Born with Everything; Subete o Motte Umareta Otoko no Ko (すべてを持って生まれた男の子)	June 4, 2015; 978-4-08-880420-0	May 3, 2016; 978-1-4215-8511-6
27. "Earth-Shatteringly Fateful Negotiations" (天下分け目の交渉時間, Tenkawakeme no Kōshō Jikan); 28. "Strats, Strats, Strats" (策策策, Saku Saku Saku); 29. "Unaware" (知られてない, Shiraretenai); 30. "Cavalry-Match Finale" (騎馬戦決着, Kibasen Kecchaku); 31. "The Boy Born with Everything" (すべてを持って生まれた男の子, Subete o Motte Urarete Otoko no Ko); 32. "Smile, Prince of Nonsense Land!" (笑え！ノンセンス界のプリンス, Warae! Nonsensu-kai no Purinsu); 33. "Shinso's Situation" (心操くんの無情, Shinsō-kun no Mujō); 34. "Victory or Defeat" (勝ち負け, Kachimake); 35. "Battle On, Challengers!" (奮え！チャレンジャー, Furue! Charenjā)
After the obstacle course race, Izuku is teamed up in a "Cavalry Battle" round with Ochaco, their classmate Fumikage Tokoyami and Support Course student Mei Hatsume. Though they and Bakugo's team are targeted by Neito Monoma and his classmates from Class 1-B, Izuku's and Bakuko's teams place among the 16 students who advance to the final round: a single-elimination tournament. Izuku is warned by his classmate Mashirao Ojiro about the "Brainwashing" Quirk of his opponent, General Studies student Hitoshi Shinso. Izuku overrides Shinso's Quirk and wins, seeing visions of the previous One For All users in the process. Izuku's next opponent is Shoto, whom he learns has a troubled relationship with his father, the number-two hero Endeavor. After other matches conclude, Ochaco prepares herself for the daunting task of battling Bakugo.
5	Shoto Todoroki: Origin; Todoroki Shōto: Origin (轟焦凍：オリジン)	August 4, 2015; 978-4-08-880449-1	August 2, 2016; 978-1-4215-8702-8
36. "Bakugō Vs. Uraraka" (爆豪VS麗日, Bakugō VS Uraraka); 37. "Midoriya and Endeavor" (緑谷とエンデヴァー, Midoriya to Endevā); 38. "Todoroki vs. Midoriya" (轟VS緑谷, Todoroki VS Midoriya); 39. "Shoto Todoroki: Origin" (轟焦凍：オリジン, Todoroki Shōto: Origin); 40. "Emancipation" (親離れ, Oya Hanare); 41. "Fight On, Ida" (飯田くんファイト, Īda-kun Faito); 42. "Final-Match Time" (いざ決勝, Iza Kesshō); 43. "Todoroki vs. Bakugo" (轟VS爆豪, Todoroki VS Bakugō); 44. "Relaxing Day Off" (休め振替休日, Yasume Furikae Kyūjitsu)
Ochaco loses against Bakugo, but she gains his respect for putting up a close fight. Izuku faces Shoto and tries convincing him to use his Quirk to its full potential, causing Shoto to remember how his father Endeavor married his mother Rei to produce a child with both of their Quirks. Endeavor's obsession with usurping All Might's position as the number-one hero put a strain on their family that resulted in Rei scarring Shoto's face with a hot teapot and being sent to a mental institution. The memory of Rei encouraging him to use his father's power convinces Shoto to fight at his full potential, defeating Izuku and later Ida before ultimately losing to Bakugo in the final round. The sports festival concludes with Bakugo making an insulting victory speech towards the other students, declaring that he is better than all of them. Meanwhile in Tokyo, Ida's older brother Ingenium is attacked and maimed by "Hero Killer" Stain, who is later approached by Kurogiri.
6	Struggling; Ugomeku (蠢く)	November 4, 2015; 978-4-08-880488-0	November 1, 2016; 978-1-4215-8866-7
45. "Time to Pick Some Names" (名前をつけてみようの会, Namae o Tsukete Miyou no Kai); 46. "Bizarre! Gran Torino Appears" (怪奇！グラントリノ現る, Kaiki! Gurantorino Arawaru); 47. "Struggling" (蠢く, Ugomeku); 48. "Getting the Knack" (掴めコツ, Tsukame Kotsu); 49. "Midoriya and Shigaraki" (緑谷と死柄木, Midoriya to Shigaraki); 50. "Kill 'em Dead" (ぶっ殺す, Bukkorosu); 51. "No, Knock it Off, Ida" (だめだやめとけ飯田くん, Dameda Yametoke Īda-kun); 52. "Hero Killer Stain Vs. U.A. Students" (ヒーロー殺しステインVS雄英生徒, Hīrō-goroshi Sutein VS Yū Ei Seito); 53. "From Todoroki to Ida" (轟から飯田へ, Todoroki kara Īda e)
Midnight tasks the Class 1-A students with choosing hero names while beginning their one-week internships at a hero agency; Izuku picks "Deku" per Ochaco's redefining of the nickname, Bakugo's names are all turned down, and Ida struggles with his brother's offer of carrying the Ingenium name. Ida picks pro hero Manual's agency in Hosu City to track down Stain. Izuku interns under All Might's mentor Gran Torino, who helps him understand more about safely channeling One For All. Police detective Naomasa Tsukauchi reveals to All Might that the captured Nomu has multiple quirks bestowed by a villain whom All Might has history with. Stain turns down a partnership with the League of Villains, as he believes All Might is a true hero while most of the rest are "fake". Shigaraki releases three more Nomus in Hosu City as Stain resumes his hunt. Izuku, after he and Gran Torino are attacked by a Nomu on their way to Shibuya City, runs off to find Ida while sending a text to Shoto. The two arrive as Ida, declaring himself as Ingenium, is immobilized by Stain's "Bloodcurdle" Quirk.
7	Katsuki Bakugo: Origin; Bakugō Katsuki: Origin (爆豪勝己：オリジン)	February 4, 2016; 978-4-08-880607-5	February 7, 2017; 978-1-4215-9040-0
54. "Re-Ingenium" (Reインゲニウム, Ri-Ingeniumu); 55. "Conclusion?!" (終局？, Shūkyoku?); 56. "Conclusion" (終局, Kecchaku); 57. "The Aftermath of Hero Killer Stain" (「ヒーロー殺しステイン」その余波, "Hīrō-goroshi Sutein"—Sono Yoha); 58. "Internship's End" (職場体験を終えて, Shokuba Taiken o Oete); 59. "Listen Up!! A Tale from the Past" (知れ!!昔の話, Shire!! Mukashi no Hanashi); 60. "Gear Up For Final Exams" (備えろ期末テスト, Sonaero Kimatsu Tesuto); 61. "The Worst Combo" (最悪のふたり, Saiaku no Futari); 62. "Katsuki Bakugo: Origin" (爆豪勝己：オリジン, Bakugō Katsuki: Origin)
Endeavor, Gran Torino, and Manual take out most of the Nomus while Ida joins Izuku and Shoto in defeating Stain, Stain remains conscious enough to save Izuku from a winged Nomu for being an "ideal hero" while ranting about society's "fake heroes". Stain is arrested, with the credit of his capture going to Endeavor so his son and friends will not be arrested for using their Quirks without permission. The video of Stain's rant soon goes viral, with the League of Villains exploiting Stain's reputation to recruit new members. Following the internships, All Might decides to tell Izuku the truth behind One For All and the identity of the mastermind behind the League of Villains: All For One, the villain who gravely wounded All Might and has the ability to steal Quirks. Soon after, Class 1-A begins their final exams where they must defeat or escape their teachers to pass.
8	Yaoyorozu Rising; Yaoyorozu: Raijingu (八百万：ライジング)	April 4, 2016; 978-4-08-880654-9	May 2, 2017; 978-1-4215-9167-4
63. "Yaoyorozu Rising" (八百万：ライジング, Yaoyorozu: Raijingu); 64. "The Task at Hand" (課題ズ, Kadaizu); 65. "Wall" (壁, Kabe); 66. "Midoriya's Observations" (緑谷のクラス観察記, Midoriya no Kurasu Kansatsu-ki); 67. "Stripping the Varnish" (むけろ一皮, Mukero Hitokawa); 68. "Encounter" (エンカウンター, Enkauntā); 69. "Interview with Midoriya" (インタビューウィズ緑谷, Intabyū Wizu Midoriya); 70. "Wild, Wild, Pussycats" (ワイルドワイルドプッシーキャッツ, Wairudo Wairudo Pusshīkyattsu); 71. "Kota" (洸汰くん, Kōta-kun)
Yaoyorozu regains her confidence following her humiliating loss to Tokoyami at the sports festival when she and Shoto defeat Aizawa to pass the exam. Izuku and Bakugo are teamed up and win against All Might. Five students – Kirishima, Rikido Sato, Mina Ashido, Kaminari, and Hanta Sero – fail the exam and are set to take remedial courses. Class 1-A goes on a shopping trip to prepare for an upcoming summer camp, during which Ochaco grapples with her developing romantic feelings for Izuku. The League of Villains gains two new members in the mentally unstable Himiko Toga and the psychopathic Dabi. Livid over how they only joined because of Stain's rant, Shigaraki confronts Izuku during the shopping trip and explains his ideology and motives to Izuku before leaving. Joined by Class 1-B for summer training under the Wild Wild Pussycats hero team, Izuku meets Kota Izumi, the nephew of the Pussycats' leader Mandalay. Mandalay explains to Izuku that Kota despises heroes because his parents were pro-heroes who were murdered by a villain.
9	My Hero; Boku no Hīrō (僕のヒーロー)	June 3, 2016; 978-4-08-880689-1	August 1, 2017; 978-1-4215-9340-1
72. "Day Two" (二日目, Futsukame); 73. "Good Evening" (グッドイブニング, Guddo Ibuningu); 74. "Smoke Signal" (狼煙, Noroshi); 75. "Stake Your Life, Hero!" (賭せ! ヒーロー, Tose! Hīrō); 76. "My Hero" (僕のヒーロー, Boku no Hīrō); 77. "It's Okay" (いいよ, Ī yo); 78. "Whirling Chaos" (混乱渦巻き, Konran Uzumaki); 79. "Drive It Home, Iron Fist!!!" (ブチ込む鉄拳!!!!, Buchikomu Tekken!!!!); 80. "Establishing the Bakugō Bodyguard Brigade" (発足爆豪護衛部隊, Hossoku Bakugō Goei Butai)
Class 1-A and 1-B continue training with the Pussycats, while Izuku attempts to convince Kota to change his views on heroes. The League of Villains attacks the students during a training exercise. The students in remedial courses are attacked by clones of Dabi created by Twice, a League of Villains recruit; the clones are defeated by Aizawa and Class 1-B teacher Vlad King. Izuku restores Kota's faith in heroes after protecting him from Muscular, the villain who killed Kota's parents. After handing Kota over to Aizawa, Izuku and the others receive a telepathic message from Mandalay that the villains are targeting Bakugo. Toga attacks Ochaco and Tsuyu, stealing some of the former's blood, and becomes obsessed with Izuku. Class 1-B students Tetsutetsu Tetsutetsu and Itsuka Kendo defeat the villain Mustard, neutralizing the poisonous gas he was filling into part of the forest.
10	All For One; Ōru Fō Wan (オール・フォー・ワン)	September 2, 2016; 978-4-08-880779-9	November 7, 2017; 978-1-4215-9437-8
81. "Roaring Upheaval" (がなる風雲急, Ganaru Fūunkyū); 82. "What a Twist!" (転転転!, Tententen!); 83. "Loss" (敗け, Make); 84. "From Ida to Midoriya" (飯田から緑谷へ, Īda kara Midoriya e); 85. "Nothing But Fools" (バカばっか, Baka Bakka); 86. "Before the Storm" (嵐の前, Arashi no Mae); 87. "Clash" (ゲキトツ, Gekitotsu); 88. "All For One" (オール・フォー・ワン, Ōru Fō Wan); 89. "All For A Certain One" (全ては1人の為に, Subete wa Hitori no Tame ni)
Bakugo and Tokoyami are abducted by League of Villains member Mr. Compress; despite the efforts of Izuku, Ochaco, Tsuyu, Shoto, and Mezo Shoji, they are only able to rescue Tokoyami. In addition, Pussycats member Ragdoll was also kidnapped. As the U.A. faculty discuss the possibility a traitor being amongst the students, Izuku joins Shoto and Kirishima on a rescue mission to save Bakugo, with Yaoyorozu and Ida accompanying them to Kamino Ward. At the villains' base, Shigaraki is unable to convince Bakugo to join the League of Villains as a group of heroes led by All Might storms into the bar. The students reach a factory filled with Nomus, just as another group led by the number four hero Best Jeanist raids it and rescues Ragdoll. However, the heroes' plan falls apart when All For One, having located them with Ragdoll's stolen "Search" Quirk, attacks Best Jeanist's group, wounds Best Jeanist himself, and warps Bakugo and the League of Villains to his location.
11	End of the Beginning, Beginning of the End; Hajimari no Owari Owari no Hajimari (始まりの終わり 終わりの始まり)	November 4, 2016; 978-4-08-880809-3	February 6, 2018; 978-1-4215-9583-2
90. "Reach Out" (手を, Te o); 91. "Symbol of Peace" (平和の象徴, Heiwa no Shōchō); 92. "One For All" (ワン・フォー・オール, Wan Fō Ōru); 93. "One For All's Ember" (残り火ワンフォーオール, Nokoribi Wan Fō Ōru); 94. "From Teacher to Disciple" (師弟のメッセージ, Shitei no Messēji); 95. "End of the Beginning, Beginning of the End" (始まりの終わり 終わりの始まり, Hajimari no Owari Owari no Hajimari); 96. "Home Visits" (家庭訪問, Kazoku Hōmon); 97. "Tell It Like It Is, Mom" (ガツンと言うからお母さん, Gatsun to Iukara Okāsan); 98. "Moving into Dorms" (入れ寮, Haireryō); 99. "Goodbye Two-Digit Chapters, Hello Three-Digits" (さよなら二桁、これから三桁, Sayonara Nikita, Korekara Sanketa)
Bakugo's abduction by the League of Villains is revealed to have been part of a carefully calculated plan by All For One to lure out the heroes, particularly All Might. All Might reaches Bakugo's location, but holds back out of concern for the youth's safety. Izuku, Kirishima, and Ida escape with Bakugo without getting dragged into the fight. All For One attempts to break All Might's spirit by revealing that Shigaraki's true identity is Tenko Shimura, the grandson of All Might's mentor and predecessor Nana Shimura. As the League of Villains is teleported away, All Might defeats All For One, sacrificing the last embers of his Quirk while sending a message of being the next Symbol of Peace which Izuku understands is for him. Following All Might's retirement and U.A. having its students live on campus for their safety, All For One is placed in the maximum-security prison known as "Tartarus", where he muses on the idea of Shigaraki eventually surpassing him.
12	The Test; Za Shiken (THE 試験)	February 3, 2017; 978-4-08-881004-1	April 3, 2018; 978-1-4215-9701-0
100. "Creating Ultimate Moves" (編め必殺技, Amehissatsuwaza); 101. "The Girl Called Mei Hatsume" (発目明という女, Hatsume Mei to Iu Onna); 102. "On Cloud Nine" (回想, Kaisō); 103. "The Test" (𝚃𝙷𝙴 試験, Za Shiken); 104. "White-Hot Battle! To Each Their Own Strengths!" (白熱!各々の実力!, Hakunetsu! Onōno no Jitsuryoku!); 105. "Shiketsu High Lurking" (這い寄る士傑高校, Haiyoru Shiketsu Kōkō); 106. "Class 1-A" (𝟷年𝙰組, Ichi-nen Ē-gumi); 107. "Denki Kaminari's Thoughts" (上鳴電気の思うこと, Kaminari Denki no Omoukoto); 108. "Rush!"
As Class 1-A settles into their dorms, they are informed by Aizawa that they must develop ultimate moves – a process that will test their strength and creativity in new ways – to have any chance of obtaining provisional hero licenses. The class begins to train while having their costumes adjusted, Izuku having his costume modified by Hatsume while developing his own "Full Cowling: Shoot Style". When Class 1-A arrives to the site of the provisional examination, they meet several other students from other schools who secretly plan on targeting them. During the initial phase, Izuku is confronted by Camie Utsushimi of Shiketsu High, who asks him why he wants to be a hero before he is rescued by Ochaco and Sero. All of Class 1-A passes the first phase after the examinees are dwindled to 100. Ochaco realizes that she has feelings for Izuku but decides to not mention them.
13	A Talk About Your Quirk; Temee no "Kosei" no Hanashida (てめェの"個性"の話だ)	April 4, 2017; 978-4-08-881049-2	June 5, 2018; 978-1-4215-9803-1
109. "Rescue Exercise" (救助演習, Kyūjo Enshū); 110. "Rescue Exercise Continued" (続·救助演習, Zoku·Kyūjo Enshū); 111. "Smoldering Start" (燻りビギニング, Kusuburi Biginingu; "Smoldering Beginning"); 112. "What's the Big Idea?" (何をしてんだよ, Nani o Shitenda yo); 113. "Test's Aftermath" (試験その後に, Shiken Sonoatoni); 114. "Results' Aftermath" (合否その後に, Gōhi Sonoatoni); 115. "Unleashed" (アンリーシュド, Anrīshudo); 116. "Meeting in Tartarus" (挨拶タルタロス, Aisatsu Tarutarosu); 117. "A Talk About Your Quirk" (てめェの"個性"の話だ, Temee no "Kosei" no Hanashida); 118. "Meaningless Battle" (意味のない戦い)
After making it through the first phase of the Provisional License Exam, Class 1-A ready themselves for the next phase where they are tasked with rescuing actors posing as civilians from a simulated disaster, with pro hero Gang Orca playing an attacking villain. With a first-aid station set up by the older students, the rest split up to cover more ground and work as teams to effectively rescue everyone. Shoto attempts to fend off Gang Orca with his flames when he is confronted by Shiketsu student Inasa Yoarashi. The two have trouble working together due to Inasa's past experience with Endeavor, before they put their differences aside to weaken Gang Orca and allow Izuku to finish him off as the others save the remaining actors. All of Class 1-A receive their Provisional Licenses except two: Shoto and Bakugo, who will take a three-month course to obtain theirs alongside Inasa. Furthermore, "Camie" was actually Toga in disguise, and she returns to the League of Villains with a vial of Izuku's blood. As this all occurs, All Might interrogates All For One in prison. That night, Bakugo meets with Izuku, where he reveals that the incident with All For One helped him piece together Izuku's connection to All Might before challenging him to a fight.
14	Overhaul; Ōbāhōru (オーバーホール)	June 2, 2017; 978-4-08-881175-8	August 7, 2018; 978-1-4215-9947-2
119. "Deku vs. Kacchan, Part 2" (デクVSかっちゃん2, Deku Bāsasu Kacchan 2); 120. "The Three" (三人, San'nin); 121. "Second Semester Opening Ceremony" (後期業式, Kōki-gyō-shiki); 122. "A Season for Encounters" (出会いの季節, Deai no Kisetsu); 123. "Unrivaled" (無敵, Muteki); 124. "Trouble Ahead!! Episode: Work Studies" (胎動!! EPエピソード:インターン, Taidō!! Episōdo: Intān); 125. "Overhaul" (オーバーホール, Ōbāhōru); 126. "Open Up, World" (拓け世界, Hirake Sekai); 127. "Sir Nighteye and Izuku Midoriya and Mirio Togata and All Might" (サー・ナイトアイと緑谷出久と通形ミリオとオールマイト, Sā Naitoai to Midoriya Izuku to Tōgata Mirio to Ōrumaito); 128. "Boy Meets..." (ボーイ・ミーツ..., Bōi Mītsu...)
As Izuku fights Bakugo, he learns that Bakugo blames himself for All Might's retirement as he manages to beat Izuku. All Might, watching the fight, informs Bakugo that he shouldn't be blaming himself. Bakugo then learns the history of One For All and vows to keep it a secret as he and Izuku are suspended from classes for a few days due to their fight. The fall semester begins with Principal Nezu announcing that the first-year students will begin "hero work-studies" earlier than planned due to the rising villain threat. Class 1-A's first lesson upon Izuku's return is overseen by U.A.'s top students, the "Big Three": Mirio Togata, Tamaki Amajiki, and Nejire Hado. Meanwhile, Twice is approached by crime boss Kai "Overhaul" Chisaki, who tricks him into taking him to the League of Villains so to request their services, intent on filling the power vacuum left by All For One's defeat. This results in a fight where Overhaul murders Magne and maims Mr. Compress. Overhaul takes his leave, offering Shigaraki time to reconsider his offer. The next day, the Big Three select Class 1-A students to join them as interns. Tamaki selects Kirishima for Fat Gum's agency, Nejire selects Ochaco and Tsuyu for Ryukyu's agency, and Mirio selects Izuku for the agency of Sir Nighteye, All Might's former sidekick who is investigating Overhaul. Despite preferring that Mirio would inherit One For All instead of Izuku and his "Foresight" Quirk seeing a vision of All Might's death, Sir Nighteye allows Izuku to join. Sometime later, Izuku and Mirio run into Overhaul and a frightened young girl.
15	Fighting Fate; Aragau Unmei (抗う運命)	September 4, 2017; 978-4-08-881202-1	October 2, 2018; 978-1-9747-0100-1
129. "Eri" (エリ, Eri); 130. "Listen To The Truth" (聞け真相, Kike Shinsō); 131. "Fighting Fate" (抗う運命, Aragau Unmei); 132. "The Plan" (計画, Keikaku); 133. "Catch Up, Kirishima" (追え切島, Oe Kirishima); 134. "Let's Go, Gutsy Red Riot" (ガッツだレッツラレッドライオット, Gattsuda Rettsura Reddo Raiotto); 135. "An Unpleasant Talk" (嫌な話, Iyana Hanashi); 136. "Close At Hand!!" (間近!!, Majika); 137. "Restraint!!" (阻止せよ!!, Soshi seyo!!)
Overhaul introduces the girl as his daughter Eri, and Izuku and Mirio are forced to let Eri leave with Overhaul to prevent him from learning that he is being spied on. As Izuku confronts All Might about his history with Sir Nighteye, Shigaraki is brought to Overhaul's lair to learn more about the Quirk-destroying bullet used on Mr. Compress, which caused him to temporarily lose his Quirk, while agreeing to Overhaul's terms. In Esuha City, Kirishima and Tamaki join Fat Gum on patrol when they confront criminals using both Quirk-destroying bullets and Quirk-enhancing drugs. When Tamaki is shot and his Quirk is temporarily blocked, Kirishima uses his new "Red Riot: Unbreakable" technique to take down the criminals. The interns join a meeting with their employing Hero Agencies, Aizawa, and numerous pro heroes to discuss the threat posed the Shie Hassaikai. During the meeting, Fat Gum reveals that the bullet Tamaki was shot with contained the blood and cells of a human whose Quirk is similar to Aizawa's, speculated to be Eri. Nighteye proposes having the heroes investigate all known Hassaikai properties to find Eri's location.
16	Red Riot; Reddo Raiotto (烈怒頼雄斗(レッドライオット))	November 2, 2017; 978-4-08-881221-2	December 4, 2018; 978-1-9747-0255-8
138. "Go!!"; 139. "Shudder! The Underground Labyrinth" (戦慄!!地下迷宮, Senritsu!! Chika Meikyū); 140. "Suneater of the Big Three" (ビッグ3のサンイーター, Biggu 3 no San'ītā); 141. "Hassaikai: Behind the Scenes" (八斎衆:ビハインド, Hassaishū: Bihaindo); 142. "Shield and Shield, Spear and Shield" (盾と盾と矛と盾, Tate to Tate to Hoko to Tate); 143. "Let's Rumble, Rappa!!" (勝負してみようや!! 乱波くん!!, Shōbu shite miyou ya!! Rappa-kun!!); 144. "Red Riot, Part 1" (烈怒頼雄斗(レッドライオット)①, Reddo Raiotto ①); 145. "Red Riot, Part 2" (烈怒頼雄斗(レッドライオット)②, Reddo Raiotto ②); 146. "Temp Squad" (出向, Shukkō); 147. "Twoga!!" (トゥガイス!!, Tūgaisu!!)
Izuku and Mirio take Aizawa's advice to not be held back by their failure to save Eri. Meanwhile, Nighteye uses his Quirk on one of Overhaul's subordinates to pinpoint Eri's location. With intel on the layout of the Shie Hassaikai's headquarters, the heroes and police raid the base, with Ryukyu's team, Nighteye's sidekicks, and most of the other Heroes subduing several of the yakuza. Nighteye and Fat Gum's groups proceed to the lower levels with the police, Aizawa, and Pro Hero Rock Lock. Shie Hassaikai member Joi Irinaka uses a Quirk-enhancing drug to take control of the basement level to separate the intruders. Tamaki holds off three members of Overhaul's "Eight Bullets" enforcers while Kirishima and Fat Gum battle two more Eight Bullets members, Kendo Rappa and Hekiji Tengai. Kirishima remembers an incident in middle school in which Ashido peacefully stopped All For One's servant Gigantomachia while he froze in cowardice. Rappa gains respect for Kirishima and Fat Gun, revealing Overhaul's plans to reinstate the Yakuza and bringing the duo to the infirmary. Meanwhile, Izuku's group struggles against Irinaka as Toga and Twice make their presence known by wounding Rock Lock.
17	Lemillion; Rumirion (ルミリオン)	February 2, 2018; 978-4-08-881320-2	February 5, 2019; 978-1-9747-0256-5
148. "The Anguish of Young Twoga" ((若きトゥガイスの悩み, Wakaki Tūgaisu no Nayami); 149. "Don't Get Mad, Irinaka" (怒らないでよ入中くん, Okoranaide yo Irinaka-kun); 150. "Mirio Togata" (通形ミリオ, Tōgata Mirio); 151. "Mirio Togata!!" (通形ミリオ!!, Tōgata Mirio!!); 152. "Lemillion" (ルミリオン, Rumirion); 153. "Transform!" (変身!, Henshin!); 154. "Unforeseen Hope" (見えない希望, Mienai Kibō); 155. "Saviors, the Saved and a Hero's Place" (救う人、救われる人、ヒーローの所在, Sukuu Hito, Sukuwareru Hito, Hīrō no Shozai); 156. "The Power of Those Saved" (救われる人のチカラ, Sukuwareru Hito no Chikara); 157. "Infinite 100 Percent" (無限100%, Mugen 100 Pāsento)
Though Shigaraki loaned the reluctant Toga and Twice to Overhaul's services per their agreement, the duo is encouraged by their leader to take advantage of the raid to sabotage the Shie Hassaikai, doing so by provoking Irinaka into exposing himself to the heroes, who capture him. Meanwhile, Mirio finds Eri and battles Overhaul, as the crime boss admits that he her adoptive uncle rather than her father as he claimed. Mirio nearly wins the fight, but Eight Bullets member Shin Nemoto shoots him with a completed Quirk-destroying bullet. Mirio continues to fight despite being Quirkless as Izuku, Aizawa and Sir Nighteye arrive. Overhaul utilizes his matter-manipulating Quirk to absorb Nemoto and transforms into a four-armed monster, with Nighteye holding him off while Izuku takes Mirio and Eri to safety. Nighteye, having seen a future where Overhaul escapes with Eri and kills Izuku, is mortally wounded. The fight is interrupted when Toga, posing as Izuku, tricks Ryukyu's team into attacking the basement during their fight with Rikiya Katsukame. Eri is encouraged by the heroes' resolve to save her, revealing that her Quirk has the ability to "rewind" living things, separating Nemoto from Overhaul while Izuku gets her to safety. Overhaul pursues them after assimilating Rikiya, warning Izuku that continued exposure to Eri's Quirk will rewind him out of existence. This convinces Izuku to use One For All at 100%, with Eri's Quirk healing his injuries as he defeats Overhaul, much to Nighteye's shock.
18	Bright Future; Akarui Mirai (明るい将来)	April 4, 2018; 978-4-08-881380-6	April 2, 2019; 978-1-9747-0437-8
158. "Chisaki's Warped Compassion" (治崎の異常な恩情, Chisaki no Ijōna Onjō); 159. "It's Over!!" (終了!!!!, Shūryō!!!!); 160. "Expressway" (高速道路, Kōsokudōro); 161. "Bright Future" (明るい将来, Akarui Mirai); 162. "Suitable One" (ふさわしき者, Fusawashiki Mono); 163. "Smoldering Flames" (くすぶる炎, Kusuburu honō); 164. "Masegaki" (マセガキ, Masegaki); 165. "Win Those Kids' Hearts" (ブラットの心に勝つ, Buratto no kokoro ni katsu); 166. "Be Proud, License Trainees" (ホッコ仮免講習, Hokko Karimen Kōshū); 167. "Number One Hero's Starting Line" (No. 1 ヒーローのスタートライン, Nanbā Wan Hīrō no Sutāto Rain)
Eri separates Overhaul from Rikiya, and Aizawa erases Eri's Quirk to save Izuku. Toga and Twice escape, informing the League of Villains of Overhaul's defeat. The League intercepts a police convoy; Dabi burns the sand-powered hero Snatch to death, while Shigaraki and Mr. Compress destroy both of Overhaul's arms so he will never be able to use his Quirk again, preventing Overhaul from undoing the coma he induced on his boss, Eri's grandfather. The villains leave with four Quirk-destroying bullets. Izuku, All Might, and Mirio visit Nighteye in the hospital as he dies from his injuries. At the same time, Gran Torino and the police capture Kurogiri while encountering Gigantomachia. Meanwhile, Bakugo and Shoto begin their special Provisional Hero License course with Inasa and the real Camie Utsushimi. Gang Orca tasks the four with winning over the unruly students of Masegaki Elementary School, which they succeed at. The internships are suspended; Class 1-A student Yuga Aoyama befriends Izuku, as his "Navel Laser" Quirk similarly damages his body. Endeavor speaks with All Might about being the Symbol of Peace, with the resolve of becoming a hero his son can be proud of.
19	School Festival; Bunkasai (文化祭)	July 4, 2018; 978-4-08-881512-1	June 4, 2019; 978-1-9747-0460-6
168. "The Strange Tale of Aoyama" (青山奇行篇, Aoyama kikō-hen); 169. "School Festival" (文化祭, Bunkasai); 170. "With Eri" (エリちゃんと, Eri-chan to); 171. "Gentle and La Brava" (ジェントルとラブラバ, Jentoru to Raburaba); 172. "Prepping for the School Festival is the Funnest Part (Part 1)" (文化祭って準備してる時が一番楽しいよね①, Bunkasai tte Junbi shiteru Toki ga Ichiban Tanoshī yone①); 173. "Prepping for the School Festival is the Funnest Part (Part 2)" (文化祭って準備してる時が一番楽しいよね②, Bunkasai tte Junbi shiteru Toki ga Ichiban Tanoshī yone②); 174. "Golden Tips Imperial" (ゴールドティップスインペリアル, Gōrudo Tippusu Inperiaru); 175. "Morning, the Day of" (当日, 朝, Tōjitsu, Asa); 176. "Deku vs. Gentle Criminal" (デクVSジェントル・クリミナル, Deku Bāsasu Jentoru Kuriminaru); 177. "At the Construction Site" (建設現場にて, Kensetsu Genba nite)
Class 1-A turns their attention to the next big school event: the U.A. Culture Festival. Everyone at Class 1-A decides to host a concert with Jiro as the lead singer, while the rest work on playing musical instruments, backup dancing and special effects. Since the band needed to be organized during their practice, Jiro wrote down a lot of notes advising the bandmates, and seeks Izuku's help on how to organize them. With Eri's health starting to improve, Izuku and Mirio request Aizawa to let Eri attend the Culture Festival to heal her mentally. Two small-time villains Gentle Criminal and La Brava plan to infiltrate U.A. on the day of the festival to encourage the students to be on guard at all times. Izuku encounters Gentle and La Brava while doing some last-minute preparations for the culture festival, resolving to keep them from getting the festival cancelled.
20	School Festival Start!! Kaisai Bunkasai!! (開催文化祭!!)	September 4, 2018; 978-4-08-881566-4	August 6, 2019; 978-1-9747-0773-7
178. "The Woman Called La Brava" (ラブラバという女, Raburaba toiu Onna); 179. "School Festival Start!!" (開催文化祭!!, Kaisai Bunkasai!!); 180. "Unbeknownst" (人知れず, Tagatame); 181. "For Someone Else" (誰が為, Jentoru to Raburaba); 182. "Let it Flow! School Festival!" (垂れ流せ! 文化祭!, Tare Nagase! Bunkasai!); 183. "Festival All Day Long!!" (終日!! 文化祭, Shūjitsu!! Bunkasai!!); 184. "Japanese Hero Billboard Chart" (ヒーロービルボードチャート, JP Hīrō Birubōdo Chāto Jeipī); 185. "Wing Hero: Hawks" (ウィングヒーロー ホークス, Uingu Hīrō Hōkusu); 186. "Endeavor and Hawks" (エンデヴァー&ホークス, Endevā ando Hōkusu); 187. "Flaming Roar! Vs. Nomu: High-End" (燃えよ轟け！VS脳無：ハイエンド, Moeyo Todoroke! Bāsasu Nōmu: Hai-Endo); 188. "Your Father, The Number One Hero" (父はNo.1ヒーロー, Chichi wa Nanbā 1 Hīrō)
As the culture festival begins, Izuku faces off against Gentle Criminal and manages to subdue him with long-range attacks he learned from All Might. He manages to defeat Gentle, even after La Brava uses her "Love" Quirk to temporarily strengthen him. As Pro Hero teachers Hound Dog and Ectoplasm approach, Gentle sends Izuku away while turning himself in to cover for La Brava, with the two getting a chance to redeem themselves. Izuku rejoins his classmates in time for the concert performance, with Jiro performing her original song "Hero Too", winning the audience and making Eri finally smile. As Eri is raised by Aizawa and the Big Three, Endeavor is officially named the new number-one hero. While meeting with the new number-two hero Hawks, Endeavor is attacked by an intelligent High-End Nomu named "Hood" that Dabi releases into the city.
21	Why He Gets Back Up; Kare wa Naze Tachi Tsuzuketa ka (彼は何故立ち続けたか)	December 4, 2018; 978-4-08-881624-1	October 1, 2019; 978-1-9747-0950-2
189. "Why He Gets Back Up" (彼は何故立ち続けたか, Kare wa Naze Tachi Tsuzuketa ka); 190. "His Start" (始まりの, Hajimarino); 191. "Dabi, Hawks, Endeavor" (荼毘・ホークス・エンデヴァー, Dabi Hōkusu Endevā); 192. "The Todoroki Family" (轟家, Todoroki-ke); 193. "Vestiges" (面影, Omokage); 194. "Cold Skies Over U.A. High!" (寒空! 雄英高校!, Samuzora! Yūei Kōkō!); 195. "Clash! Class A vs. Class B!" (激突!A組VSB組, Gekitotsu! Ē-gumi bāsasu Bī-gumi); 196. "Make It Happen, Shinso!!" (それ行け心操くん！, Soreike Shinsō-kun!); 197. "Quaotic Quirkstravaganza" ("個性"ドンパチ大応酬, "Kosei" Donpachi Dai-ōshū); 198. "Know Where You Stand When It Counts!!" (必要!! 時には足止め現状把握!, Hitsuyō!! Toki ni wa Ashitome Genjō Haaku!); 199. "Operation New Improv Moves!" (新技即興オペレーション!, Shin-waza Sokkyō Operēshon!); 200. "Clever Commander!" (智将!!, Chishō!!)
Endeavor struggles against Hood as the monster scars the left side of his face, while Hawks uses his "Fierce Wings" Quirk to protect bystanders. Endeavor continues fighting despite his injuries and destroys Hood with Hawks' help. The two are ambushed by Dabi before the number-five hero Mirko drives him off. Hawks later meets Dabi at a warehouse to discuss the attack while being told that he is not ready to meet Shigaraki, as Hawks is acting on orders from the Hero Public Safety Commission to infiltrate the League of Villains. Endeavor is released from the hospital, resolving to atone for the wrongs he did to his family; while Shoto and his older sister Fuyumi are willing to give him a chance, middle son Natsuo refuses to forgive Endeavor. Meanwhile, Izuku begins having dreams of when One For All was created and meets the original holder – All for One's younger twin brother Yoichi. Soon after, Classes 1-A and 1-B meet at Field Gamma for their first Joint Training Battle, with Shinso joining them to prepare for joining the Hero Course. The students are divided into four-man teams, with Shinso a fifth member in Tsuyu's team as they win their match against Ibara Shiozaki's team. Yaoyorozu's team then faces Kendo's team, with Kendo considering Yaoyorozu a rival she intends to surpass.
22	That Which is Inherited; Uketsugu Mono (受け継ぐモノ)	February 4, 2019; 978-4-08-881723-1	December 3, 2019; 978-1-9747-0965-6
201. "Foresight" (先を見据えて, Saki o Misuete); 202. "Match 3" (第3セット, Daisan Setto); 203. "Flexible! Juzo Honenuki!" (柔軟！骨抜柔造！, Jūnan! Honenuki Jūzō!); 204. "Tuning Up" (チューニング, Chūningu); 205. "Detour" (遠回り, Tōmawari); 206. "Match 3 Conclusion" (第3セット決着, Daisan Setto Ketchaku); 207. "Early Bird!" (先手必勝!, Sente Hisshō!); 208. "Match 4 Conclusion" (第4セット決着, Daiyon Setto Ketchaku); 209. "Match 5 Start" (第5セットスタート, Daigo Setto Sutāto); 210. "The One For All Dream" (ワン・フォー・オールの夢, Wan Fō Ōru no Yume); 211. "That Which is Inherited" (受け継ぐモノ, Uketsugu Mono); 212. "That Which is Inherited, Part 2" (続・受け継ぐモノ, Zoku Uketsugu Mono)
Kendo's team wins their match, with Kendo feeling that she has yet to surpass Yaoyorozu as the combat zone is changed to another area due to the damage her team did. Facing Tetsutetsu's team, Ida and Shoto use a technique they learned, but their match ends in a draw when Shoto, Tetsutetsu, and Juzo Honenuki are knocked unconscious while Ida is trapped. Bakugo's team flawlessly win their match against Setsuna Tokage's team, who fail to account for Bakugo becoming a team player in his own way. Monoma becomes determined to settle his one-sided rivalry with 1-A as his team and Shinso face Izuku's team. During the match, Monoma's plan to provoke Izuku into falling under Shinso's Quirk backfires when black tendrils erupt from Izuku's body and attack the area indiscriminately. Ochaco restrains Izuku long enough for Shinso to use his Quirk and subdue him.
23	Our Brawl; Bokura no Dairansen (ぼくらの大乱戦)	May 2, 2019; 978-4-08-881797-2	February 4, 2020; 978-1-9747-0966-3
213. "Realm of Souls" (魂の所在, Tamashii no Shozai); 214. "Our Brawl" (ぼくらの大乱戦, Bokura no Dairansen); 215. "Final Face-Off! Midoriya Vs. Shinso!" (最終局面！緑谷VS心操!!, Saishū Kyokumen! Midoriya bāsasu Shinsō!!); 216. "Class A vs. Class B: Conclusion!" (決着! A組VSB組, Ketchaku! Ē-gumi bāsasu Bī-gumi); 217. "The New Power and All For One" (新しい力とオール・フォー・ワン, Atarashī Chikara to Ōru Fō Wan); 218. "The Meta Liberation Army" (異能解放軍, Inō Kaihō-gun); 219. "Go, Slidin' Go!" (ゴー！スライディン・ゴー！, Gō! Suraidin Gō!); 220. "My Villain Academia" (僕のヴィランアカデミア, Boku no Viran Akademia); 221. "Memento from All For One" (オール・フォー・ワンの置き土産, Ōru Fō Wan no Okimiyage); 222. "Tomura Shigaraki: Distortion" (死柄木弔：Distortion, Shigaraki Tomura: Disutōshon); 223. "Cockroaches" (ゴキブリ, Gokiburi); 224. "Revival Party" (再臨祭, Sairin-sai)
Izuku ends up in the vestige world after being subdued by Shinso's Quirk and meets Nana's predecessor Daigoro Banjo, who reveals that Izuku used his Quirk "Blackwhip" when it responded to his intent to capture Monoma. Banjo explains that the core of One For All has grown so large that its previous owners' Quirks are manifesting within Izuku and that he must learn to control his emotions before using them. Regaining consciousness, Izuku and Ochaco regroup with Ashido and Mineta as the match turns into a fist fight. Despite Monoma's gambit after being captured, Izuku defeats Shinso while his classmates capture the others. The Joint Training ends with Class 1-A's victory and Shinso earning a passing grade that will allow him to possibly transfer onto the Hero Course. As Aizawa takes Monoma to visit Eri, Bakugo and Shoto finally earn their Hero Licenses. Meanwhile, the League of Villains are approached by All For One's right-hand-man, Dr. Kyudai Garaki, who offers his services to them if Shigaraki can defeat Gigantomachia. However, the League's progress is interrupted when they learn their information broker Giran has been abducted by a terrorist organization known as the Meta Liberation Army, whose leader Re-Destro invites them to Deika City for an ultimatum.
24	All It Takes Is One Bad Day	August 2, 2019; 978-4-08-881880-1	June 2, 2020; 978-1-9747-1120-8
225. "Interview with a Vampire" (インタビュー・ウィズ・ヴァンパイア, Intabyū Wizu Vanpaia); 226. "Bloody Love" (愛の血, Koi no Chi); 227. "Sleepy" (眠い, Nemui); 228. "Wounded Soul" (心の外傷, Kokoro no Gaishō); 229. "All It Takes Is One Bad Day"; 230. "Sad Man's Parade" (サッドマンズパレード, Saddo Manzu Parēdo); 231. "Path" (道, Michi); 232. "Meta Abilities and Quirks" (異能と"個性", Inō to "Kosei"); 233. "Bright Future" (アカルイミライ, Akarui Mirai); 234. "Destruction Sense" (壊覚, Kaikaku); 235. "Tenko Shimura: Origin" (志村転弧：オリジン, Shimura Tenko: Orijin)
The Meta Liberation Army, led by their founder's descendent Re-Destro, is determined to crush the League of Villains. As the League fights over 100,000 members of the MLA for their future, the tragic events that turned them each to villainy are revealed: Spinner was discriminated against for his "Gecko" mutant Quirk, Toga was forced to suppress her bloodlust from her Quirk and act "normal" until she stabbed a boy she had a crush on, and a homeless Twice's only friends were his clones who eventually killed each other. Toga's Quirk evolves to allow her to use the Quirks of anyone she transforms into and cares for, and uses Ochaco's Quirk to kill MLA officer Curious. While fighting MLA officer Skeptic, Twice overcomes his traumatic existential crisis to use his duplication Quirk on himself. As Gigantomachia arrives, Shigaraki reveals that he can use his power without directly touching his victim as he destroys Re-Destro's base, forcing him out onto the field. During the fight, Shigaraki remembers his past.
25	Tomura Shigaraki: Origin; Shigaraki Tomura: Orijin (死柄木弔：オリジン)	December 4, 2019; 978-4-08-882074-3	October 6, 2020; 978-1-9747-1762-0
236. "Tenko Shimura: Origin, Part 2" (志村転弧：オリジン2, Shimura Tenko: Orijin 2); 237. "Tomura Shigaraki: Origin" (死柄木弔：オリジン, Shigaraki Tomura: Orijin); 238. "Liberation" (解放, Kaho); 239. "Successor" (後継, Kōkei); 240. "Power" (力, Chikara); 241. "Do That Interview!" (受け応えろ！インタビュー, Ukekotaero! Intabyū); 242. "Have a Merry Christmas!" (メリれ！クリスマス!, Merire! Kurisumasu!); 243. "Off to Endeavor's Agency!" (いざ！エンデヴァー事務所!, Iza! Endevā Jimusho!); 244. "Recommended Reading" (オススメ, Osusume); 245. "Rise to Action" (決起, Kekki); 246. "Message" (メッセージ, Messēji)
Shigaraki remembers accidentally killing his family when his Quirk first manifested, enabling him to use his powers to the fullest. Re-Destro is forced to amputate his legs to survive, surrendering while acknowledging that Shigaraki embodies his father's ideals, and Gigantomachia recognizes Shigaraki as All for One's successor. The League of Villains and MLA join forces to form the Paranormal Liberation Front. Hawks, believing the merged villain group could destroy hero society, fakes Best Jeanist's death to solidify the villains' trust. After a round of practice interviews with Team Lurkers member Mt. Lady and the Christmas holidays, the student internships resume and Shoto invites Bakugo and Izuku to intern with Endeavor. On the first day, the four meet Hawks, who gives Endeavor a book written by the original Destro with a concealed message. Endeavor deciphers it and learns Shigaraki will stage a nationwide attack in four months. Meanwhile, Shigaraki gets Dr. Garaki's aid to gain more power and destroy All Might's legacy.
26	The High, Deep Blue Sky; Sora, Takaku Gunjō (空、高く群青)	March 4, 2020; 978-4-08-882225-9	January 5, 2021; 978-1-9747-1977-8
247. "Status Report!" (語れ！現状, Katare! Genjō!); 248. "One Thing at a Time" (一つ一つ, Hitotsu hitotsu); 249. "The Hellish Todoroki Family" (地獄の轟くん家, Jigoku no Todoroki-kun-ka); 250. "Ending" (エンディング, Endingu); 251. "Just One Week" (一週間, Isshūkan); 252. "The Unforgiven" (許されざる者, Yurusarezarumono); 253. "Shirakumo" (白雲, Shirakumo); 254. "More of a Hero Than Anyone" (誰よりもおまえはヒーローに, Dare Yori mo Omae wa Hīrō ni); 255. "Hero Hopeful" (ヒーロー志望, Hīrō Shibō); 256. "The High, Deep Blue Sky" (空、高く群青, Sora, Takaku Gunjō); 257. "Pass It Forward, to Whomever" (紡げ、何者でも無く。, Tsumuge, nanimonode mo naku.); 258. "Friends" (仲間, Nakama)
Understanding the Hero Public Safety Commission's reason for the Work Study program to prepare everyone for Shigaraki's attack, Endeavor accepts Izuku and Bakugo as his students while instructing them and Shoto to spend their winter break trying to outpace him into intercepting a villain. Izuku and Bakugo meet Fuyumi and Natsuo at a Todoroki family dinner, learning that Natsuo blames Endeavor for the death of the oldest son Toya, who burned himself alive after his Quirk went out of control. The next day, Natsuo is kidnapped by a villain who wants to be killed by Endeavor; Shoto, Izuku, and Bakugo rescue Natsuo while Endeavor apologizes for failing him as a father, deciding to cut ties with his family for their wellbeing. As Class 1-A begins their third semester, Aizawa and Present Mic are called to Tartarus Prison, where they are informed that Kurogiri is a Nomu created from the corpse of their school friend Oboro Shirakumo. Aizawa manages to reach what remains of Shirakumo's mind and hears "Hospital" before the Kurogiri persona reasserts himself. Meanwhile, All Might concludes his research on the Quirks of the previous One for All owners and delivers it to Izuku. Three months later, on a late March day, the heroes launch an all-out assault on Dr. Garaki's hospital in Jaku city.
27	One's Justice; Wanzu Jasutisu (ワンズ ジャスティス)	July 3, 2020; 978-4-08-882332-4	April 6, 2021; 978-1-9747-2101-6
259. "A Quiet Beginning" (静かな始まり, Shizukana Hajimari); 260. "Life's Work" (人生の全て, Jinsei no Subete); 261. "High-Ends" (ハイエンド, Hai Endo); 262. "Miruko, the No.5 Hero" (No.5 のミルコさ, Nanbā 5 no Miruko-san); 263. "I Wanna Be with You Guys!!" (皆といたいよー!!!, Mina To Itaiyō!!!); 264. "One's Justice" (ワンズ ジャスティス, Wanzu Jasutisu); 265. "Villains and Heroes" (敵とヒーロー, Viran to Hīrō); 266. "Happy Life" (ハッピーライフ, Happīraifu); 267. "Flames" (炎, Honō)
A group of Heroes led by Endeavor raids Jaku Hospital in order to capture Shigaraki, with Endeavor's and Ryukyu's U.A. interns tasked with evacuating civilians out of the surrounding city. Mirko locates the laboratory where Shigaraki is reaching the final stages of his upgrade. While the Pro Heroes are busy fighting Dr. Garaki's released Nomus and evacuating patients, he is forced to activate his remaining High-End Nomus to buy time and complete Shigaraki's upgrades. Mirko loses multiple limbs fighting the High-Ends but continues fighting. Meanwhile, a second group, led by the Lurkers' leader Edgeshot, raids the Gunga Mountain Villa to capture the rest of the Paranormal Liberation Front. Most U.A. students at the villa are on the backlines; a handful of students, including Tokoyami and a nervous Kaminari, are on the frontlines with the pros. Hawks confronts Twice and tries to get him to surrender, but Twice, feeling betrayed and angry, unleashes his "Sad Man's Parade". Dabi arrives to assist his companion, but Hawks manages to kill Twice. Dabi defeats Hawks, but Tokoyami, who had left Fat Gum as he was escorting the other students to the backlines, rescues Hawks. Endeavor and the other Heroes come to Mirko's aid against the High-Ends.
28	The Thrill of Destruction; Hametsu no Borutēji (破滅のボルテージ)	September 4, 2020; 978-4-08-882378-2	June 1, 2021; 978-1-9747-2288-4
268. "Scramble!" (スクランブル, Sukuranburu); 269. "The Three of Us" (三人で, San Ninde); 270. "Inheritance" (継けい承しょう, Keishō); 271. "Dark Cloud" (ダーククラウド, Dāku Kuraudo); 272. "Good Morning!" (お早う, Ohayou!); 273. "The Thrill of Destruction" (破滅のボルテージ, Hametsu no Borutēji); 274. "Search" (サーチ, Sāchi); 275. "Encounter, Part 2" (エンカウンター2, Enkauntā 2); 276. "You Cheated...!" (「チートが…!」, Chīto ga…!)
Mirko and Present Mic destroy the tank containing Shigaraki, leaving him in a state of apparent death due to the interruption of his stabilization process. However, Shigaraki suddenly awakens, with Dr. Garaki revealing that the treatment was to grant him All For One's Quirk. At Gunga, Gigantomachia smells All For One's scent and starts moving as Mt. Lady tries to slow him down; Tokoyami escapes with the unconscious Hawks. Upon awakening, Shigaraki uses All For One's Quirk to amplify his "Decay" Quirk and kill many Heroes while also destroying Jaku Hospital and much of the surrounding city. Endeavor confronts Shigaraki as the latter begins to hone on Izuku's position in an attempt to steal One For All, forcing him and Bakugo to lure him away to a deserted area. Gran Torino pushes the two youths away from Shigaraki as the other Heroes begin to fight him, Aizawa, guarded by Rock Lock and Manual, erases Shigaraki's Quirks. Shigaraki prevails over Endeavor and Ryukyu, and attempts to kill Aizawa, but is stopped by Izuku and Bakugo.
29	Katsuki Bakugo Rising; Bakugō Katsuki: Raijingu (爆豪勝己：ライジング)	January 4, 2021; 978-4-08-882474-1	September 7, 2021; 978-1-9747-2510-6
277. "Who...?" (誰だよ...?, Dareda yo...?); 278. "Disaster Walker" (災害ウォーカー, Saigai u~ōkā); 279. "League of Villains vs. U.A. Students" (敵連合VS雄英生, Viran Rengō Bui Esu Yūei Sei); 280. "Red Riot, Part 3" (烈(レッ)怒(ド)頼(ライ)雄(オッ)斗(ト)③, Reddo Raiotto ③); 281. "Plus Ultra"; 282. "Footfall of Destruction" (破壊の足音, Hakai no Ashiato); 283. "75"; 284. "Deep Blue Battle" (群ぐん青じょうバトル, Gunjō Batoru); 285. "Katsuki Bakugo Rising" (爆豪勝己：ライジング, Bakugō Katsuki: Raijingu)
Izuku, Bakugo and the other Heroes engage in a fight with Shigaraki. Gigantomachia brings the rest of the League of Villains with him to reach Shigaraki and overwhelms Mt. Lady, her teammate Kamui Woods, and Midnight. Midnight is separated and ambushed as she orders Yaoyorozu to lead Classes 1-A and 1-B in sedating Gigantomachia. Ashido, Mt. Lady, and Kirishima work together to force-feed Gigantomachia the drugs, but it appears to be ineffective as he continues his path of destruction. Gran Torino is nearly killed by Shigaraki, who also throws one of the Quirk-Destroying Bullets at Aizawa, forcing him to amputate his own leg before the drug can spread throughout his body. Shoto joins the fight, but Shigaraki gouges one of Aizawa's eyes out, allowing him to regenerate. Shigaraki's body begins to tear itself apart as his upgrade is incomplete, while Izuku unlocks Nana Shimura's Quirk of floating in mid-air. While Izuku continues to fight Shigaraki, Endeavor uses his most powerful move on Shigaraki, but All For One takes control of his body and, after injuring Endeavor, tries to kill Izuku, only for Bakugo to save him and get stabbed in his place.
30	Dabi's Dance; Dabi Dansu (ダビダンス)	April 2, 2021; 978-4-08-882590-8	March 1, 2022; 978-1-9747-2715-5
286. "The One Within Us" (僕ぼくらの中なかの人ひと, Bokura no Naka no Hito); 287. "Mistake" (間違い, Machigai); 288. "Save Takeo!!" (助たすけ出だせ!! タケオさん, Tasukedase!! Takeo-san); 289. "Miss Candid and Miss Shut-Away" (アケスケちゃんとしまっとくちゃん, Akesuke-chan to shimattoku-chan); 290. "Dabi's Dance" (ダビダンス, Dabi Dansu); 291. "Thanks for Going Strong" (元気でいてくれてありがとう, Genki deite kurete arigatō); 292. "Threads of Hope" (一縷の希望たち, Ichiru no Kibō-tachi); 293. "Hero-Saturated Society" (ヒーロー飽和社会, Hīrō hōwa shakai); 294. "Final Performance" (ラストステージ, Rasuto Sutēji); 295. "Tenacious" (しつこい, Shitsukoi)
As Ida and Nejire join the fight, Shigaraki attempts to kill Izuku and steal One For All, but he and All For One are repelled by Nana and Yoichi. The Villains approach the hospital ruins, except Toga who lures Ochaco into a trap, where she deduces that both of them have feelings for Izuku. Toga asks Ochaco if Villains like her and Twice deserve to die; Ochaco answers that Toga is a threat to others, upsetting both girls as Toga flees. Gigantomachia reaches Shigaraki, and Dabi reveals he is a still-living Toya Todoroki, now obsessed with destroying Endeavor's reputation. Skeptic publicly broadcasts Dabi's message, in which he reveals Endeavor's abusive past and Hawks' killing of Twice. Dabi prepares to incinerate the Heroes, but Best Jeanist arrives and ambushes him. Bakugo declares his Hero name "Great Explosion Murder God Dynamight" to Best Jeanist. The High-Ends attack Best Jeanist, but are stopped by Mirio, whose Quirk has been restored by Eri. Meanwhile, Gigantomachia breaks free, but is repelled by Endeavor and finally knocked out by the sedatives. Mr. Compress mutilates his own body using his Quirk to escape Best Jeanist's binds and rescue his companions. Izuku unlocks the fourth bearer's Quirk, "Danger Sense", while All For One regains control of Shigaraki's body and calls the remaining High-Ends.
31	Izuku Midoriya and Toshinori Yagi; Midoriya Izuku to Yagi Toshinori (緑谷出久と八木俊典)	August 4, 2021; 978-4-08-882729-2	July 5, 2022; 978-1-9747-3212-8
296. "Hellish Hell" (極々、地獄, Gokukoku, Jigoku); 297. "Tartarus" (タルタロス, Tarutarosu); 298. "Sounds of Collapse" (崩れゆく音, Kuzure Yuku Oto); 299. "Like Those Tragic Tales" (邦画の辛いヤツ, Hōga no Tsurai Yatsu); 300. "The Hellish Todoroki Family, Part 2" (地獄の轟くん家 2, Jigoku no Todoroki-kun-chi 2); 301. "The Wrong Way to Put Out a Fire, Part 1" (火の不始末 前編, Hi no Fushimatsu Zenpen); 302. "The Wrong Way to Put Out a Fire, Part 2" (火の不始末 後編, Hi no Fushimatsu Kōhen); 303. "Top Three" (トップ 3, Toppu Surī); 304. "Izuku Midoriya and Toshinori Yagi" (緑谷出久と八木俊典, Midoriya Izuku to Yagi Toshinori); 305. "Izuku Midoriya and Tomura Shigaraki" (緑谷出久と死柄木弔, Midoriya Izuku to Shigaraki Tomura); 306. "The Final Act Begins" (終章開幕, Shūshō Kaimaku)
Despite many of the Villains and Paranormal Liberation Front warriors being arrested, Shigaraki, Dabi, Spinner, Skeptic, and separately Toga flee, and a clone of Re-Destro killed many members of the Hero Public Safety Commission. Izuku and the other wounded Heroes are taken to Central Hospital. At least nineteen Heroes were killed during the battle, including Midnight, whose corpse is found by the horrified Class 1-A students. The High-Ends and Shigaraki, now fully under the control of All For One, break into Tartarus, freeing All For One's original body and numerous Villains. The public turns their backs on heroes following the disastrous battle and Dabi's revelations, leading to many Pro Heroes retiring in disgrace. The entire Todoroki family, Hawks, and Best Jeanist vow to take down Dabi. Hawks remembers how his father, a serial killer, was stopped by Endeavor. Izuku, who is in talks to his predecessors in the vestige world, learns that One For All slowly kills anyone who already has a Quirk, and that he will likely be the last user due to the Quirkless population declining. Izuku tells Nana that he wants to save Shigaraki instead of immediately trying to kill him. All Might reveals the truth about One For All to the Heroes as more information starts to leak out as a result of the battle, and Izuku leaves letters to his classmates revealing the same truth as he drops out of U.A.
32	Your Turn; Za Nekusuto (THE(ザ) NEXT(ネクスト))	October 4, 2021; 978-4-08-882788-9	October 4, 2022; 978-1-9747-3236-4
307. "Been A While!!" (おひさ!!, O Hisa!!); 308. "Full Power!!" (全力!!, Zenryoku!!); 309. "Can't Be a Child Anymore" (子どもじゃいられない, Kodomo ja Irarenai); 310. "Masters and Pupil" (師と弟子, Shi to Deshi); 311. "Here We Go!!" (来た!!, Kita!!); 312. "Hired Gun" (刺客, Shikaku); 313. "High-Speed Long-Range Mobile Cannon" (高速移動長距離砲台, Kōsoku Idō Chōkyori Hōdai); 314. "The Lovely Lady Nagant" (麗しきレディ・ナガン, Uruwashiki Redi Nagan); 315. "Platitudes" (綺麗事, Kirei Goto); 316. "Your Turn" (THE(ザ) NEXT(ネクスト), Za Nekusuto); 317. "Scars, Blood, Filth" (傷、血、泥, Kizu, Chi, Doro); 318. "Reckless" (ヤミクモ, Yamikumo)
After the total collapse of hero society following the disastrous Paranormal Liberation War, Izuku teams up with All Might, Endeavor, Hawks, Best Jeanist, and the Lurkers, heading out into the crime-ridden cities to take down the escaped convicts and remnants of the Paranormal Liberation Front. After defeating Muscular in a one-sided rematch, Izuku is ambushed by an assassin hired by All For One, a former Pro Hero named Lady Nagant, who betrayed the Hero Public Safety Commission after discovering their vast corruption. During the battle, Izuku unlocks the Quirk of the third user, "Fa Jin", allowing him to tap into nearly 100% of One For All's power and defeat Nagant. Izuku convinces Nagant to switch sides, believing that she still has the heart of a hero, but she suddenly explodes due to a self-destruction Quirk she was given without her knowledge. Hawks saves Nagant from dying, and she reveals the location of the Villains' supposed hideout, where a video recording of All For One taunts Izuku before detonating a bomb in an attempt to kill the Heroes. Izuku continues to grow more physically and emotionally weary in his pursuit of stopping the villains and keeping everyone safe, even to the point of abandoning All Might and becoming a full-on vigilante. Izuku's exhaustion eventually gets to him and he is almost killed by another of All For One's assassins, until he is suddenly rescued by Bakugo, who alerts the rest of Class A that he's located Izuku.
33	From Class A to One For All; Ē-Gumi kara Wan Fō Ōru e (A組からOFA(ワン・フォー・オール)へ)	February 4, 2022; 978-4-08-882846-6	February 7, 2023; 978-1-9747-3474-0
319. "Friend" (友だち, Tomodachi); 320. "Deku vs. Class A" (デク VS A組, Deku Bāsasu Ē-gumi); 321. "From Class A to One For All" (A組からOFA(ワン・フォー・オール)へ, Ē-Gumi kara Wan Fō Ōru e); 322. "Great Explosion Murder God Dynamight" (大•爆•殺•神ダイナマイト, Daibakusatsu-Shin Dainamaito); 323. "That Single Step" (一歩, Ippo); 324. "A Young Woman's Declaration" (未成年の主張, Miseinen no Shuchō); 325. "The Bonds of One For All" (つながるOFA(ワン・フォー・オール), Tsunagaru Wan Fō Ōru); 326. "Who Are You Really?" (お前は誰だ, Omae wa Dareda); 327. "Rest!!" (REST(レスト)!!!, Resuto!!!); 328. "No Man Is an Island" (つながるつながる, Tsunagaru Tsunagaru)
After Izuku drops out of U.A., the rest of Class A declare their intentions to confront him about his decision. Cornering Endeavor, they are able to convince him to let them go out, and eventually manage to track him down. When Izuku refuses to stop his reckless vigilantism and attempts to flee, they end up chasing him down while reminding Izuku of all he's done to each of them and why they want to be with him in order to convince him to return to U.A. Unable to keep him restrained, the class works together and are able to stop Izuku from escaping. Bakugo apologizes to Izuku for his bullying, which convinces Izuku to give up before he promptly collapses from exhaustion. However, when Class A returns to U.A., an angry mob of refugees, who believe that Izuku's presence will put everyone in danger, tries to attack him. Ochaco is able to convince them to stand down, saying that Izuku is their only hope of stopping the Villains and that heroes need to rest too. After getting cleaned by his classmates and reconciling with All Might, Izuku is finally able to rest. After Stain gives All Might information on when All For One and Shigaraki plan to attack, All Might contacts heroes from other countries – with America's number-one hero Star and Stripe answering the call.
34	United States of America; Amerika (アメリカ)	May 2, 2022; 978-4-08-883066-7	May 2, 2023; 978-1-9747-3663-8
329. "In the Nick of Time, a Big-Time Maverick from the West!" (欧米ギリギリ!! ぶっちぎりの凄い奴, Ōbei Girigiri!! Butchigiri no Sugoi Yatsu); 330. "Me and Myself" (俺と僕, Ore to Boku); 331. "United States of America" (アメリカ, Amerika); 332. "State-of-the-Art Hypersonic Intercontinental Cruise..." (型極超音速大陸間巡航, Shingata Gokuchōonsoku Tairiku-kan Junkō); 333. "Specter" (亡霊, Bōrei); 334. "Parting Gift" (置おき土産みやげ, Oki Miyage); 335. "Zygotes" (有精卵, Yūseiran); 336. "Villain" (敵(ヴィラン), Viran); 337. "A Disposable Life" (使い捨ての人生を, Tsukaisute no Jinsei o); 338. "The Story of How We All Became Heroes, Part 1" (皆がヒーローになるまでの物語①, Min'na ga Hīrō ni naru made no Monogatari ①); 339. "The Story of How We All Became Heroes, Part 2" (皆がヒーローになるまでの物語②, Min'na ga Hīrō ni naru made no Monogatari ②)
All For One plans to steal Star and Stripe's Quirk, the reality-warping ability "New Order", believing that obtaining both it and One For All will make him completely unstoppable. He uses Shigaraki's body to battle her, while Shigaraki himself begins to merge with the vestige of All For One inside his mind. After a hard-hitting battle, Shigaraki succeeds in stealing "New Order" and kills Star and Stripe with "Decay". However, at the last moment, Star and Stripe turns her own Quirk into a virus that destroys several of Shigaraki's Quirks before self-destructing, forcing Shigaraki to flee the battlefield and go back into hiding. The news of Star and Stripe's death causes the United Nations to declare Japan a "no man's land" and withdraw all of their planned aid, much to the anger of many foreign Heroes. As Class A prepares for the decisive battle against All For One, Toru Hagakure discovers that Aoyama is the League of Villains' spy within U.A., having taken up the role after All For One gave him his Quirk ten years prior. Izuku and Hagakure apprehend Aoyama and his parents, but, recognizing the family as All For One's victims, Class A decides to use them as part of a plan to catch All For One off-guard. Aizawa reassures Aoyama that he has his full support, while the students and staff of U.A. prepare for the final battle that will decide the fate of hero society.
35	Battle Flame	July 4, 2022; 978-4-08-883161-9	September 5, 2023; 978-1-9747-3909-7
340. "The Story of How We All Became Heroes, Part 3" (皆がヒーローになるまでの物語③, Min'na ga Hīrō ni naru made no Monogatari ③); 341. "The Story of How We All Became Heroes, Part -1" (皆がヒーローになるまでの物語−①, Min'na ga Hīrō ni naru made no Monogatari Mainasu ①); 342. "The Extreme Quiet Before the Storm" (嵐の前の超静けさ, Arashi no Mae no Chō Shizukesa); 343. "Let You Down"; 344. "Stars" (主役, Shuyaku); 345. "Division"; 346. "Super Hyper Unfair Broken Stage" (スーパーハイパークソハメステージ, Sūpā Haipā Kuso Hame Sutēji); 347. "Inflation"; 348. "Unrequited" (失恋, Shitsuren); 349. "Battle Flame"; 350. "Bound to a Fiery Fate" (エン, En)
The Heroes prepare for their plan to defeat All For One, Shigaraki, and the rest of the Paranormal Liberation Front by splitting them up so they are unable to assist each other. Meanwhile, the Villains make their own preparations as Toga is given a vial of Twice's blood by Dabi, Spinner is assigned to command an army of mutant Quirk users, and Shigaraki's body undergoes a disturbing transformation. As the day of the operation approaches, Izuku and Ochaco talk about their personal feelings towards each other and the villains. When the day arrives, All For One orders Aoyama to lure Izuku to a remote location so he can steal One For All, but Aoyama betrays and successfully tricks him into warping the entirety of the Paranormal Liberation Front to their location, as the Heroes themselves are summoned to the battlefield using Monoma copying Kurogiri's "Warp Gate" Quirk. They activate the "Troy" defense system, trapping the villains in cages that are then thrown through Warp Gates to locations all over Japan. Shigaraki is taken to a now-floating U.A., but Izuku is sent into the wrong portal after Toga ambushes him. Despite his Quirks being nullified by Monoma copying Aizawa's "Erasure" Quirk, Shigaraki's body suddenly mutates, putting the Heroes on the defensive. On Okuto Island, Toga goes completely insane and attempts to kill Izuku after he rejects her love confession, but Ochaco and Tsuyu help him escape. In Kamino Ward, Shoto faces off against Dabi, whose body is rapidly burning up from severe over-usage of his "Blueflame" Quirk. Dabi reveals that All For One and Dr. Garaki rescued him on the day of his apparent death, and he devoted his life to killing his family after discovering that Endeavor didn't change.
36	Two Flashfires; Futatsu no Kakushaku (二つの赫灼)	October 4, 2022; 978-4-08-883261-6	December 5, 2023; 978-1-9747-4108-3
351. "Two Flashfires" (二つの赫灼, Futatsu no Kakushaku); 352. "Ultimate Moves" (必殺技, Hissatsuwaza); 353. "Endeavor"; 354. "Oopsie Daisy!!" (ここだ!!, Kokoda!!); 355. "Extras"; 356. "Regarding the Enemy" (敵について, Teki ni Tsuite); 357. "Wounded Hero, Burning Bright and True!!" (焼身照命!! 手負いのヒーロー, Shōshin Shōmei!! Teoi no Hīrō); 358. "The Guy Who's Made Some Progress" (ちょっと進んだ男, Chotto Susunda Otoko); 359. "Place of Learning" (学び舎, Manabiya); 360. "Despite It All..." (それでも, Soredemo); 361. "Abnormal Happenings" (異変, Ihen); 362. "Light Fades to Rain"
As Dabi's firepower grows increasingly unstable, Shoto unveils his Ultimate Move, "Phosphor", a perfect blend of his "hot" and "cold" sides that is able to overwhelm Dabi and finally knock him out. News of Shoto's victory spreads throughout the other battlefields. At the Jaku Hospital ruins, some U.A. students and Mt. Lady defend Gigantomachia's confinement, where Ashido confronts Midnight's killer. A gigantified Spinner leads an army of mutants in attempting to free Kurogiri at the Central Hospital. Endeavor and Hawks battle All For One at Gunga Mountain, but Endeavor is incapacitated. Jiro and Tokoyami arrive to save Hawks, and the three are able to land a devastating attack that shatters All For One's protective mask when his stolen Quirks rebel. Endeavor re-enters the fight and incinerates All For One, only for the villain to completely regenerate. Elsewhere at U.A., Best Jeanist, Edgeshot, Mirko, Tamaki, Nejire, and Bakugo are unable to damage the continually mutating Shigaraki. Mirio joins the battle, and a comment he makes about Shigaraki having no friends re-awakens Tenko Shimura's spirit, causing All For One's vestige to realize that they aren't as fully merged as he believed. Bakugo attempts to attack Shigaraki, only for Shigaraki to impale him and stop his heart.
37	Those Who Defend, Those Who Violate; Fusegu Mono to Okasu Mono (禦ぐ者と侵す者)	February 3, 2023; 978-4-08-883428-3	March 5, 2024; 978-1-9747-4324-7
363. "Those Who Defend, Those Who Violate" (禦ぐ者と侵す者, Fusegu Mono to Okasu Mono); 364. "Why We Wield Power" (何の為に力を使う, Nan to Tame ni Chikara o Tsukau); 365. "No. 4 and No. 5" (No.4とNo.5, Nanbā 4 to Nanbā 5); 366. "Full Moon" (桃, Momo); 367. "Deku vs. All For One" (デク VS AFO, Deku Bāsasu Ōru Fō Wan); 368. "Rev Up, One For All" (唸れ OFA, Unare Wan Fō Ōru); 369. "A Chain of Events, Across the Ages" (連なる星霜, Tsuranaru Seisō); 370. "HIStory"; 371. "Together with Shoji" (しょーじくんといっしょ。, Shōji-kun to Issho.); 372. "Naked"; 373. "Friends"; 374. "Butterfly Effect"
Dabi's Quirk undergoes an awakening and he creates a twisted version of Shoto's "Phosphor" technique, overwhelming his brother and incinerating the nearby Heroes. During his fight with Endeavor and Hawks, All For One had used a duplicate of the Quirk-Destroying Drug to revert his body back to its prime, despite knowing that it will eventually rewind him out of existence. Edgeshot uses his Quirk's ultimate technique to turn his entire body into threads and insert himself into Bakugo's body to save his life. As Best Jeanist, Mirko, and the Big Three continue to fight Shigaraki, his body mutates again and he quickly defeats most of them. However, Mirio distracts Shigaraki long enough for Izuku to join the fight. Izuku, enraged at the sight of Bakugo's body, confronts All For One's vestige inside Shigaraki's mind. Izuku and Mirio realize that contrary to All For One's claims, Shigaraki is trying to break free of his master's control. Unlocking the Quirk of the Second User, "Gearshift", Izuku overwhelms Shigaraki. Shoji and Koji Koda defend the hospital against Spinner's army, sympathizing with their fellow mutants' plight while striving to protect the innocent civilians inside. As Spinner fights Shoji, his mental state deteriorates from his extra Quirks, leading to his army standing down after seeing him massacre a group of hospital workers. Spinner fights past Present Mic and awakens Kurogiri by pleading with him to save Shigaraki. As Spinner falls unconscious, Kurogiri warps Dabi and Toga to Gunga Mountain. Dabi confronts his father, while Toga uses Twice's blood to transform into him and create an army of Doubles.
38	Hopes	June 2, 2023; 978-4-08-883553-2	June 4, 2024; 978-1-9747-4584-5
375. "Chaotic Confusion" (滅茶苦茶, Mechakucha); 376. "On Knife's Edge" (花に嵐, Hana ni Arashi); 377. "The Chain Thus Far" (ここに至るまでの連なり, Koko ni Itaru made no Tsuranari); 378. "The Story of How We All Became Heroes, Part 4" (皆がヒーローになるまでの物語④, Min'na ga Hīrō ni naru made no Monogatari ④); 379. "Hopes"; 380. "A Skosh" (カンイチ, Kan'ichi); 381. "Dark" (闇, Yami); 382. "Don't Let Him Go" (行かせない!!, Ika Senai!!); 383. "Meek Spirits" (小さな心, Chīsana Kokoro); 384. "It's a Small World"; 385. "The Impulses of Youth" (若き衝動, Wakaki Shōdō); 386. "I AM HERE"
Toga and her Twice Doubles quickly overwhelm the Heroes, including Ochaco and Tsuyu who followed her. At U.A., Kurogiri warps Present Mic and several Twice Doubles to Aizawa, Manual, and Monoma's position, undoing Monoma's "Erasure" and re-enabling Shigaraki's Quirks. Aizawa and Present Mic nearly fall to their deaths but are saved by Kurogiri, whose "Shirakumo" personality is resurfacing. Skeptic hacks into U.A. and disables its engines, but three old foes help the Heroes: La Brava counter-hacks Skeptic to reveal his location and livestreams the battles with business students and news broadcasters, Gentle stops the school from plummeting to the ground, and Lady Nagant blows Shigaraki's hands off. Shigaraki reclaims his body, declaring his intention to destroy everything, as Izuku tackles him onto the streets below. At Jaku, Kirishima, Ashido, and Shinso defeat the sludge villain and brainwash Gigantomachia. At Gunga, the Heroes fighting the Twice Doubles and All For One are assisted by the Shiketsu High School students, Tokoyami, Mt. Lady, and Gigantomachia. Gigantomachia continues attacking All For One even after Shinso's brainwashing is broken, furious at having been abandoned. All For One kills Gigantomachia and maims the Heroes before stealing Hawks' Quirk and escaping. Shoto and Ida head to Gunga to help Endeavor deal with Dabi, who is preparing to incinerate everything within the area, including himself and a shelter sabotaged by All For One's spies. All Might, aided by a suit of powered armor, prepares to confront All For One.
39	Battle Without a Quirk "Kosei" Naki Tatakai ("個性"無き戦い)	November 2, 2023; 978-4-08-883662-1	October 1, 2024; 978-1-9747-4964-5
387. "Congealing" (煮凝り, Nikogori); 388. "Toya" (燈矢, Tōya); 389. "Assurance and Prayers" (安心と祈り, Anshin to Inori); 390. "Shoto Todoroki Rising" (轟焦凍: ライジング, Todoroki Shōto: Raijingu); 391. "Rejecting the World" (拒んだ世界, Kobanda Sekai); 392. "Villain Name" (ヴィラン名, Viran Mei); 393. "A Girl's Ego" (少女のエゴ, Shōjo no Ego); 394. "Ochako Uraraka vs. Himiko Toga" (麗日お茶子VS渡我被身子, Uraraka Ochako VS Toga Himiko); 395. "Built Upon the Joy of Others" (幸せの上に, Shiawase no Ue ni); 396. "Battle Without a Quirk" ("個性"無き戦い, "Kosei" Naki Tatakai); 397. "Trash Cleanup" (ゴミ拾い, Gomihiroi); 398. "Toshinori Yagi: Rising/Origin" (八木俊典：ライジングオリジン, Yagi Toshinori: Raijinguorijin)
As the shelter is evacuated, Endeavor discovers that Dabi has successfully manifested Rei's ice Quirk. Endeavor attempts to fly into the air so that Dabi's self-destruction will only kill the two of them, but Rei, Natsuo, and Fuyumi join to use their own ice Quirks to cool Dabi down. Ida brings Shoto to his family, and Shoto uses his "Phosphor" technique to extinguish Dabi's flames for good, leaving Dabi barely alive. Toga and her Twice Doubles destroy everything in their path, with several of the Doubles transforming into copies of the Heroes and using their own Quirks against them. Ochaco persists in trying to talk to Toga, but she refuses to listen and fatally stabs Ochaco. Even still, Ochaco admits her love for Izuku and her jealously towards Toga's smile, in the process awakening her Quirk and causing everyone to float. Toga finally confesses all of her deepest feelings and regrets to Ochaco, just as Twice's blood runs out and all of the Doubles disintegrate into dust. As Ochaco nearly bleeds to death, a guilt-ridden Toga transfers all of her blood into Ochaco, dying happily as she saves Ochaco's life. Elsewhere, All Might suits up in the mechanized "Armored All Might" suit to stall All For One. Using his knowledge of his foe's tactics, as well as the suit's support items that mimic the Quirks of the Class A students, All Might holds his own. After reflecting on his own past and purpose, All Might dedicates himself to winning this final battle.
40	The End of an Era, and...	April 4, 2024; 978-4-08-884007-9	February 11, 2025; 978-1-9747-5273-7
399. "Organic, Mingling Clusters of Light" (有機交流電燈, Yūki Kōryū Dentō); 400. "Beyond Limits" (限界を, Genkai o); 401. "The Lunatic"; 402. "The Tearful Days"; 403. "The End of an Era, and..." 404. "We Love You, All Might!!" (大好き！！ オールマイト！！, Daisuki!! Ōru Maito!!); 405. "The Final Boss!!" (ラスボス!!, Rasubosu!!); 406. "Get a Grip on Your Quirk!!" (掴め!!おまえの"個性", Tsukame!! Omae no "kosei"); 407. "An Exceptional Child" (超常遺児, Chōjō iji); 408. "The Eyes Tell All!!" (努努!! GANRIKI, Yumeyume!! GANRIKI); 409. "Quirk: Explosion!!" ("個性"!!爆破!!, "Kosei"!! Bakuha!!); 410. "Farewell, All For One!!" (さらば! オール・フォー・ワン, Saraba! Ōru Fō Wan)
After Hagakure and Aoyama a villain at "Troy", Aoyama confides to her that he will leave U.A. to atone for his crimes. All Might activates a giant laser that deals enough damage to revert All For One into a child. Stain arrives to assist All Might, but is quickly killed by All For One with his Quirk being stolen in the process, while All Might's armored suit is destroyed. Having reached U.A., All For One attempts to warp Shigaraki over to his location, but Shigaraki resists. All Might tries to blow himself up with All For One, but the villain paralyzes him with Stain's Quirk. A newly-revived Bakugo saves All Might by blowing off All For One's hands and using up the villain's remaining time. Through flashbacks, it is shown that All For One and Yoichi were the first babies born with Quirks, even before the first recorded instance. After killing Yoichi, All For One discovered that his brother's Quirk had been passed onto Toshitsugu Kudo, creating One For All, and embarked on a futile pursuit for several decades before being defeated by All Might. In the present, All For One is reminded of Kudo by Bakugo's relentless attacks, which rewind the villain to an infant then out of existence. Meanwhile, Shigaraki steals Izuku's "Danger Sense" and gains the upper hand.
41	Overlay; Ōbārei (オーバーレイ)	August 2, 2024; 978-4-08-884169-4	June 3, 2025; 978-1-9747-5588-2
411. "History's Greatest Villain" (史上最悪の敵, Shijō Saiaku no Viran); 412. "History's Maddest Hero" (史上最狂のヒーロ, Shijō Saikyō no Hīrō); 413. "Leaden Mass" (鉛の塊, Namari no Katamari); 414. "Overlay" (オーバーレイ, Ōbārei); 415. "Rejection" (拒絶, Kyozetsu); 416. "Wrench It Open, Izuku Midoriya!!" (こじ開けろ! 緑谷出久!!, Kojiakero! Midoriya Izuku!!); 417. "Shimura" (志村, Shimura); 418. "From Midoriya to Shimura" (緑谷から志村へ, Midoriya kara Shimura e); 419. "Design"; 420. "From Aizawa" (相澤くんから, Aizawa-kun kara); 421. "We Are Here"; 422. "Izuku Midoriya Rising" (緑谷出久：ライジング, Midoriya Izuku: Raijingu)
As the battle against Shigaraki is pushed to Mount Fuji, he and the remaining vestiges believe that he can no longer be saved, but Izuku refuses to forsake the humanity he sensed within him. Kudo sees a crack Star and Stripe left in Shigaraki's soul, deciding that Izuku should forcefully transfer One For All's individual Quirk Factors to damage Shigaraki. Kudo's plan proves successful, and additionally brings Izuku into Shigaraki's memories, where he discovers that he was abused by his father Kotaro, who hated Heroes after being abandoned by Nana. Nana breaks down and takes responsibility for her son's abuse leading to Tenko Shimura becoming Tomura Shigaraki. All For One's vestige reappears and reveals that he orchestrated Shigaraki's entire life, including manipulating Kotaro into becoming abusive and secretly giving Tenko "Decay". Shigaraki falls into despair, allowing All For One to destroy his vestige and take over his body. Realizing that he can no longer steal One For All and finally subdue Yoichi, All For One abandons his plans for world domination and destroys both of Izuku's arms in preparation to execute him. Sero, Ojiro, and Sato save Izuku, and Aizawa arrives to use Eri's severed horn to restore Izuku's arms. Kurogiri warps all of the remaining active Heroes to the battlefield, who all help Izuku get closer to All For One, letting him use the remaining embers of One For All to deal a fatal blow to the villain.
42	I Am Here; Watashi ga Kita! (私が来た!)	December 4, 2024; 978-4-08-884349-0	October 21, 2025; 978-1-9747-5918-7
423. "One For All vs. All For One" (OFA vs AFO, Wan Fō Ōru Bāsasu Ōru Fō Wan); 424. "Epilogue" (エピローグ, Epirōgu); 425. "Unseasonable" (季節外れの, Kisetsuhazure no); 426. "The Hellish Todoroki Family: Final" (地獄の轟くん家・FINAL, Jigoku no Todoroki-kun-chi Fainaru); 427. "Who Was Tomura Shigaraki, Really?" (死柄木弔とはなんだったのか, Shigaraki Tomura to wa Nan Datta No Ka); 428. "The Girl Who Loves Smiles" (笑顔が好きな女の子, Egao ga Sukina Onnanoko); 429. "I Am Here" (私が来た!, Watashi ga Kita!); 430. "My Hero Academia" (僕のヒーローアカデミア, Boku no Hīrō Akademia); 431. "More"
Bakugo kills Kurogiri when he attempts to attack Izuku, enabling Izuku to land another blow that disintegrates All For One. Inside All For One's mental realm, he is destroyed by Yoichi, the One For All users, and Shigaraki. Shigaraki's dying vestige concedes that he was nothing more than an angry child, and asks Izuku to "do his best" and leave a message for Spinner. In the aftermath of the war, foreign Heroes and civilians assist in reconstruction. Bakugo discovers that Izuku is Quirkless again as All Might thanks his two students for saving him. One month later, Class 2-A begins their second year; Aoyama leaves U.A. and is replaced by Shinso. The Todoroki family visits Toya on his deathbed, where a retired Endeavor announces that he will atone for his sins by visiting Toya until he dies; Toya shows remorse and privately apologizes to Shoto. Hawks beomes chairman of the Public Safety Commission and pardons Nagant, who chooses to remain in prison until society improves. Spinner refuses to forgive Izuku. Eri's grandfather is awoken from his coma and berates Overhaul. Ochaco grieves over Toga's death, but Izuku comforts her and calls her his "Hero". An abused child with a destructive Quirk is helped by an old woman who previously ignored Tenko. Eight years later, a retired Izuku works as a teacher at U.A., seeing all of his former classmates working as successful Pro Heroes in various ways. After encouraging a young boy named Dai, All Might gives Izuku a suit based on "Armored All Might", allowing him to rejoin his friends as the first Quirkless Pro Hero. A month later, the Class A alumni reunite to celebrate Shoto reaching number two in the hero rankings. Toga's vestige pushes Ochaco to be with Izuku, and the two confess feelings for one another.
