= Crunchyroll Anime Award for Best Action =

- Awarded for: Best action anime series of the previous year
- Country: United States; Japan
- First award: Bones – Mob Psycho 100 (2017)
- Currently held by: A-1 Pictures – Solo Leveling: Arise from the Shadow (2026)

Highlights
- Most wins: Studio: Bones Film / MAPPA (2); Anime: Jujutsu Kaisen / Solo Leveling (2)
- Most nominations: Studio: Bones Film / MAPPA (6); Anime: Attack on Titan / Demon Slayer: Kimetsu no Yaiba (4)
- Website: Crunchyroll Anime Awards

The Crunchyroll Anime Award for Best Action is a genre-specific award given at the Crunchyroll Anime Awards since its inaugural edition in 2017. It is given for the best action anime series from the previous year. Winners are determined through a combined voting process by judges and public voting.

Mob Psycho 100 by Bones first won the award in 2017. In the latest edition in 2026, the second season's Arise from the Shadow of Solo Leveling by A-1 Pictures won the award.

== Winners and nominees ==
In the following list, the first titles listed in gold are the winners; those not in gold are nominees, which are listed in alphabetical order. The years given are those in which the ceremonies took place.

=== 2010s ===
Year	Anime	Studio(s)
2016 (1st)
2016 (1st)	Mob Psycho 100	Bones
2016 (1st)	My Hero Academia	Bones
2016 (1st)	Drifters	Hoods Entertainment
2016 (1st)	Kabaneri of the Iron Fortress	Wit Studio
2016 (1st)	Most Popular "Other": JoJo's Bizarre Adventure: Diamond is Unbreakable (season 3)	David Production
2017 (2nd)
2017 (2nd)	My Hero Academia (season 2)	Bones
2017 (2nd)	Attack on Titan (season 2)	Wit Studio
2017 (2nd)	Blood Blockade Battlefront & Beyond (season 2)	Bones
2017 (2nd)	Fate/Apocrypha	A-1 Pictures
2017 (2nd)	Land of the Lustrous	Orange
2017 (2nd)	Mobile Suit Gundam: Iron-Blooded Orphans (season 2)	Sunrise

=== 2020s ===
Year	Anime	Studio(s)
2021 (6th)
2021 (6th)	Jujutsu Kaisen (cour 2)	MAPPA
2021 (6th)	Attack on Titan: The Final Season Part 1 (season 4)	MAPPA
2021 (6th)	Demon Slayer: Kimetsu no Yaiba Mugen Train Arc (season 2)	Ufotable
2021 (6th)	SSSS.Dynazenon	Studio Trigger
2021 (6th)	Vivy: Fluorite Eye's Song	Wit Studio
2021 (6th)	Wonder Egg Priority	CloverWorks
2021/2022 (7th)
2021/2022 (7th)	Demon Slayer: Kimetsu no Yaiba Entertainment District Arc (season 2 cour 2)	Ufotable
2021/2022 (7th)	Attack on Titan: The Final Season Part 2 (season 4 cour 2)	MAPPA
2021/2022 (7th)	Cyberpunk: Edgerunners	Studio Trigger and CD Projekt
2021/2022 (7th)	JoJo's Bizarre Adventure: Stone Ocean (season 5)	David Production
2021/2022 (7th)	Lycoris Recoil	A-1 Pictures
2021/2022 (7th)	Spy × Family	Wit Studio and CloverWorks
2022/2023 (8th)
2022/2023 (8th)	Jujutsu Kaisen (season 2)	MAPPA
2022/2023 (8th)	Attack on Titan: The Final Season The Final Chapters Special 1 (season 4 cour 3)	MAPPA
2022/2023 (8th)	Bleach: Thousand-Year Blood War – The Separation	Pierrot
2022/2023 (8th)	Chainsaw Man	MAPPA
2022/2023 (8th)	Demon Slayer: Kimetsu no Yaiba Swordsmith Village Arc (season 3)	Ufotable
2022/2023 (8th)	One Piece	Toei Animation
2023/2024 (9th)
2023/2024 (9th)	Solo Leveling	A-1 Pictures
2023/2024 (9th)	Bleach: Thousand-Year Blood War – The Conflict	Pierrot Films
2023/2024 (9th)	Dandadan	Science SARU
2023/2024 (9th)	Demon Slayer: Kimetsu no Yaiba Hashira Training Arc (season 4)	Ufotable
2023/2024 (9th)	Kaiju No. 8	Production I.G
2023/2024 (9th)	Wind Breaker	CloverWorks
2025 (10th)
2025 (10th)	Solo Leveling: Arise from the Shadow (season 2)	A-1 Pictures
2025 (10th)	Dandadan (season 2)	Science SARU
2025 (10th)	Gachiakuta	Bones Film
2025 (10th)	Kaiju No. 8 (season 2)	Production I.G
2025 (10th)	My Hero Academia: Final Season (season 8)	Bones Film
2025 (10th)	One Piece	Toei Animation

== Records ==
=== Anime series ===
Jujutsu Kaisen holds the record for the most wins in an anime series.

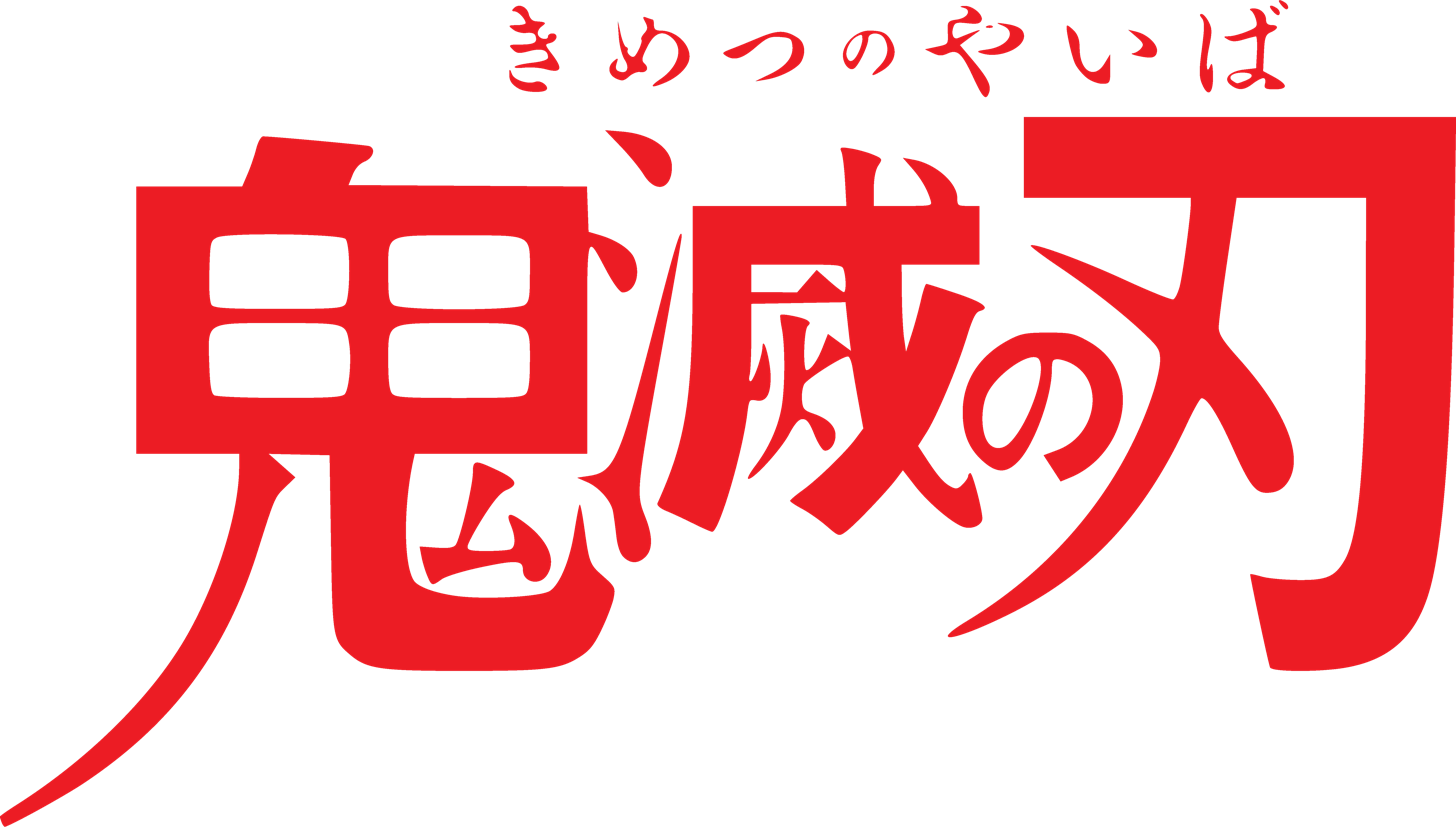
Attack on Titan and Demon Slayer: Kimetsu no Yaiba holds the record for the most nominations, while the former has the most nominations without a win in an anime series.

Franchise	Wins	Nominations	Seasons
Jujutsu Kaisen	2		Season 1 cour 2, Season 2
Solo Leveling	2		Season 1, Arise from the Shadow
Demon Slayer: Kimetsu no Yaiba	1	4	Mugen Train Arc, Entertainment District Arc, Swordsmith Village Arc, Hashira Training Arc
My Hero Academia	1	3	Season 1, Season 2, Final Season
Attack on Titan	0	4	Season 2, The Final Season Part 1, The Final Season Part 2, The Final Season The Final Chapters Special 1
Bleach: Thousand-Year Blood War	0	2	The Separation, The Conflict
Dandadan	0	2	Season 1, Season 2
JoJo's Bizarre Adventure	0	2	Diamond is Unbreakable, Stone Ocean
Kaiju No. 8	0	2	Season 1, Season 2
One Piece	0	2	

=== Studios ===

Bones Film and MAPPA holds the record for the most wins and nominations in an anime studio.

Wit Studio holds the record for the most nominations without a win in an anime studio.

Bones Film and MAPPA received the most wins (2) and nominations (6) for an anime studio, with Jujutsu Kaisen becoming the first anime to win multiple awards. Bones Film also won two awards; both Mob Psycho 100 and the second-season of My Hero Academia received wins. Ufotable received a single award.

Wit Studio received the most nominations for an anime studio without a single win with 4. Attack on Titan and Demon Slayer: Kimetsu no Yaiba received four nominations, but the former did not win a single award.

Studio	Wins	Nominations	Seasons
Bones Film	2	6	Blood Blockade Battlefront & Beyond (Season 2), Gachiakuta, Mob Psycho 100, My Hero Academia (Season 1, Season 2, Final Season)
MAPPA	2	6	Attack on Titan (The Final Season Part 1, The Final Season Part 2, The Final Season The Final Chapters Special 1), Chainsaw Man, Jujutsu Kaisen (Season 1 cour 2, Season 2)
A-1 Pictures	2	4	Fate/Apocrypha, Lycoris Recoil, Solo Leveling (Season 1, Arise from the Shadow)
Ufotable	1	4	Demon Slayer: Kimetsu no Yaiba (Mugen Train Arc, Entertainment District Arc, Swordsmith Village Arc, Hashira Training Arc)
Wit Studio	0	4	Attack on Titan (Season 2), Kabaneri of the Iron Fortress, Spy × Family, Vivy: Fluorite Eye's Song
CloverWorks	0	3	Spy × Family, Wind Breaker, Wonder Egg Priority
David Production	0	2	JoJo's Bizarre Adventure (Diamond is Unbreakable, Stone Ocean)
Pierrot	0	2	Bleach: Thousand-Year Blood War (The Separation, The Conflict)
Production I.G	0	2	Kaiju No. 8 (Season 1, Season 2)
Science SARU	0	2	Dandadan (Season 1, Season 2)
Studio Trigger	0	2	Cyberpunk: Edgerunners, SSSS.Dynazenon
Toei Animation	0	2	One Piece
