= Crunchyroll Anime Award for Best Animation =

- Awarded for: Best animation of the previous year
- Country: United States; Japan
- First award: MAPPA – Yuri on Ice (2017)
- Currently held by: A-1 Pictures – Solo Leveling: Arise from the Shadow (2026)

Highlights
- Most wins: Studio: Ufotable (4); Franchise: Demon Slayer: Kimetsu no Yaiba (4)
- Most nominations: Studio: MAPPA (9); Franchise: Demon Slayer: Kimetsu no Yaiba (5)
- Website: Crunchyroll Anime Awards

The Crunchyroll Anime Award for Best Animation is an animation award given at the Crunchyroll Anime Awards since its inaugural edition in 2017. It is given for the best animation in anime films and series from the previous year. Winners are determined through a combined voting process by judges and public voting.

Yaoi sports anime Yuri on Ice by MAPPA first won the award in 2017. Ufotable and its anime series Demon Slayer: Kimetsu no Yaiba hold the record for the most wins with 4 in consecutive years (2022–2025), the most of any animation studios and anime series to date. MAPPA holds the record for the most nominations with 9, while Wit Studio also holds the record for the most nominations without a single win with 7.

In the latest edition in 2026, the second season's Arise from the Shadow of Solo Leveling by A-1 Pictures won the award.

== Winners and nominees ==
In the following list, the first titles listed in gold are the winners; those not in gold are nominees, which are listed in alphabetical order. The years given are those in which the ceremonies took place.

=== 2010s ===
Year	Anime	Studio(s)
2016 (1st)
2016 (1st)	Yuri on Ice	MAPPA
2016 (1st)	Flip Flappers	Studio 3Hz
2016 (1st)	Kabaneri of the Iron Fortress	Wit Studio
2016 (1st)	Mob Psycho 100	Bones
2016 (1st)	Most Popular "Other": Re:Zero − Starting Life in Another World	White Fox
2017 (2nd)
2017 (2nd)	My Hero Academia (season 2)	Bones
2017 (2nd)	A Silent Voice	Kyoto Animation
2017 (2nd)	Land of the Lustrous	Orange
2017 (2nd)	Little Witch Academia	Studio Trigger
2017 (2nd)	March Comes in Like a Lion (season 2)	Shaft
2017 (2nd)	Miss Kobayashi's Dragon Maid	Kyoto Animation
2018 (3rd)
2018 (3rd)	Violet Evergarden	Kyoto Animation
2018 (3rd)	A Place Further than the Universe	Madhouse
2018 (3rd)	Bloom Into You	Troyca
2018 (3rd)	Devilman Crybaby	Science SARU
2018 (3rd)	Megalo Box	TMS Entertainment
2018 (3rd)	My Hero Academia (season 3)	Bones
2019 (4th)
2019 (4th)	Mob Psycho 100 (season 2)	Bones
2019 (4th)	Attack on Titan (season 3)	Wit Studio
2019 (4th)	Demon Slayer: Kimetsu no Yaiba	Ufotable
2019 (4th)	Fate/Grand Order – Absolute Demonic Front: Babylonia	CloverWorks
2019 (4th)	Sarazanmai	MAPPA and Lapin Track
2019 (4th)	Vinland Saga	Wit Studio

=== 2020s ===
Year	Anime	Studio(s)
2020 (5th)
2020 (5th)	Keep Your Hands Off Eizouken!	Science SARU
2020 (5th)	Beastars	Orange
2020 (5th)	Great Pretender	Wit Studio
2020 (5th)	Jujutsu Kaisen	MAPPA
2020 (5th)	Princess Connect! Re:Dive	CygamesPictures
2020 (5th)	The God of High School	MAPPA
2021 (6th)
2021 (6th)	Demon Slayer: Kimetsu no Yaiba Mugen Train Arc (season 2)	Ufotable
2021 (6th)	Jujutsu Kaisen (cour 2)	MAPPA
2021 (6th)	Miss Kobayashi's Dragon Maid S	Kyoto Animation
2021 (6th)	Mushoku Tensei: Jobless Reincarnation	Studio Bind
2021 (6th)	Vivy: Fluorite Eye's Song	Wit Studio
2021 (6th)	Wonder Egg Priority	CloverWorks
2021/2022 (7th)
2021/2022 (7th)	Demon Slayer: Kimetsu no Yaiba Entertainment District Arc (season 2 cour 2)	Ufotable
2021/2022 (7th)	Akebi's Sailor Uniform	CloverWorks
2021/2022 (7th)	Attack on Titan: The Final Season Part 2 (season 4 cour 2)	MAPPA
2021/2022 (7th)	Cyberpunk: Edgerunners	Studio Trigger and CD Projekt
2021/2022 (7th)	Ranking of Kings (cour 2)	Wit Studio
2021/2022 (7th)	Spy × Family	Wit Studio and CloverWorks
2022/2023 (8th)
2022/2023 (8th)	Demon Slayer: Kimetsu no Yaiba Swordsmith Village Arc (season 3)	Ufotable
2022/2023 (8th)	Attack on Titan: The Final Season The Final Chapters Special 1 (season 4 cour 3)	MAPPA
2022/2023 (8th)	Chainsaw Man	MAPPA
2022/2023 (8th)	Jujutsu Kaisen (season 2)	MAPPA
2022/2023 (8th)	Mob Psycho 100 (season 3)	Bones
2022/2023 (8th)	Trigun Stampede	Orange
2023/2024 (9th)
2023/2024 (9th)	Demon Slayer: Kimetsu no Yaiba Hashira Training Arc (season 4)	Ufotable
2023/2024 (9th)	Dandadan	Science SARU
2023/2024 (9th)	Delicious in Dungeon	Studio Trigger
2023/2024 (9th)	Frieren: Beyond Journey's End	Madhouse
2023/2024 (9th)	Kaiju No. 8	Production I.G
2023/2024 (9th)	Solo Leveling	A-1 Pictures
2025 (10th)
2025 (10th)	Solo Leveling: Arise from the Shadow (season 2)	A-1 Pictures
2025 (10th)	Dandadan (season 2)	Science SARU
2025 (10th)	Gachiakuta	Bones Film
2025 (10th)	My Hero Academia: Final Season (season 8)	Bones Film
2025 (10th)	One Piece	Toei Animation
2025 (10th)	Takopi's Original Sin	Enishiya

== Records ==
As of 2026, 10 wins out of 59 nominations have been given to 43 anime series and 1 anime film.

=== Anime films and series ===
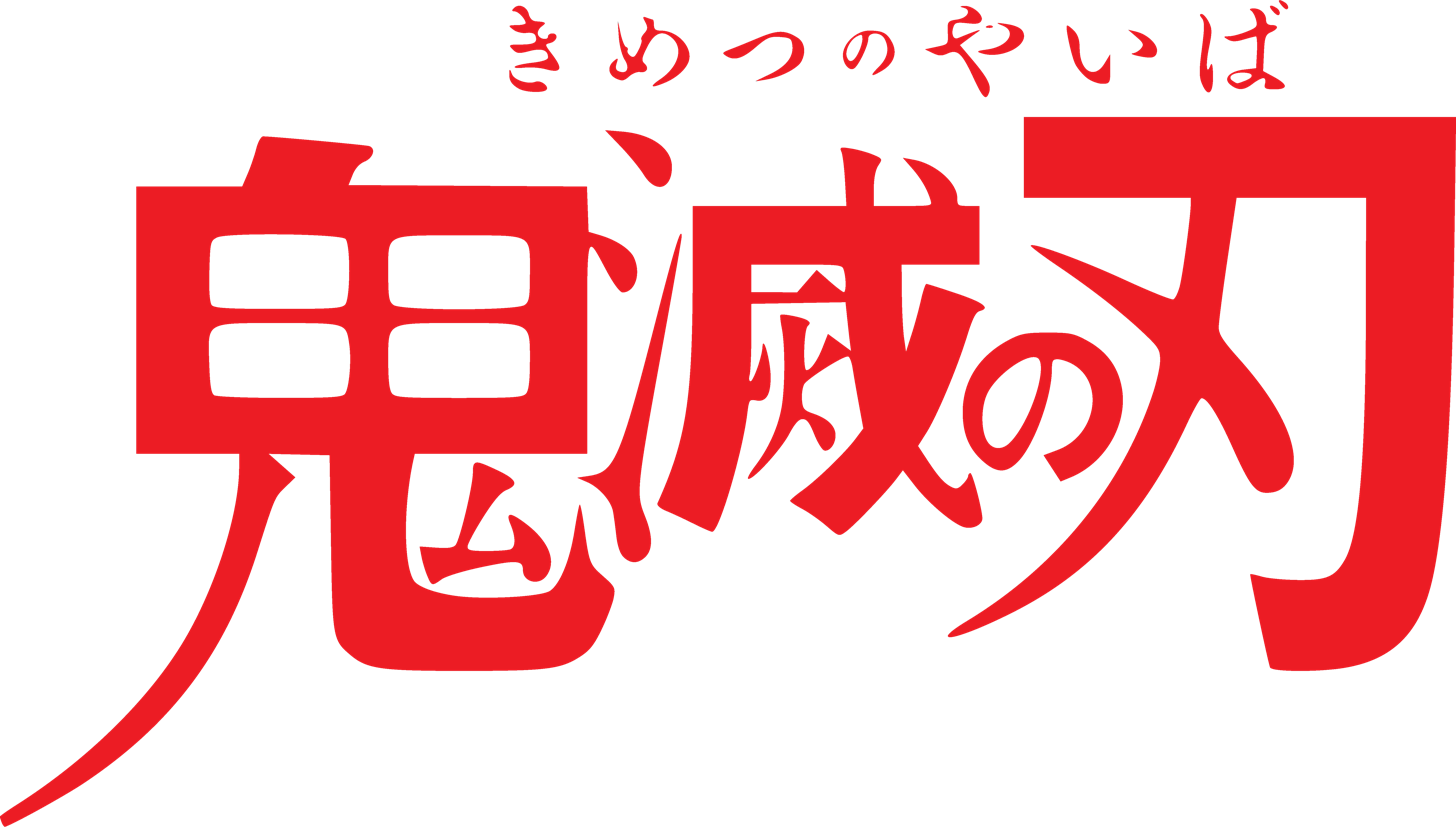
Demon Slayer: Kimetsu no Yaiba holds the record for an anime series.

Demon Slayer: Kimetsu no Yaiba received the most wins (4; consecutive) and nominations (5) for an anime series. In addition of other series, Mob Psycho 100, My Hero Academia, and Solo Leveling received nominations more than once, winning 1. Single-cour anime series (or miniseries) Keep Your Hands Off Eizouken!, Violet Evergarden, and Yuri on Ice also received wins, with the latter became the only original anime series to do so.

Only 6 anime series separately produced by MAPPA received the most nominations with 9, with Jujutsu Kaisen, together with Attack on Titan, received the most nominations without a single win with 3. Kyoto Animation's A Silent Voice is the only anime film to be nominated in that category.

Franchise	Wins	Nominations	Seasons
Demon Slayer: Kimetsu no Yaiba	4	5	Unwavering Resolve Arc, Mugen Train Arc, Entertainment District Arc, Swordsmith Village Arc, Hashira Training Arc
Mob Psycho 100	1	3	Season 1, Season 2, Season 3
My Hero Academia	1	3	Season 2, Season 3, Final Season
Solo Leveling	1	2	Season 1, Arise from the Shadow
Attack on Titan	0	3	Season 3, The Final Season Part 2, The Final Season The Final Chapters Special 1
Jujutsu Kaisen	0	3	Season 1 cour 1, Season 1 cour 2, Season 2
Dandadan	0	2	Season 1, Season 2
Miss Kobayashi's Dragon Maid	0	2	Season 1, S

=== Studios ===
Ufotable holds the record for the most wins in an anime studio.

MAPPA holds the record for the most nominations in an anime studio.

Wit Studio holds the record for the most nominations without a win in an anime studio.

Ufotable received the most wins (4; consecutive) for an anime studio, with its only nominated production Demon Slayer: Kimetsu no Yaiba receiving the most. Bones Film also received 2 wins out of 7 nominations; both the second seasons of Mob Psycho 100 and My Hero Academia received wins for the studio. The remaining studios (A-1 Pictures, Kyoto Animation, MAPPA, and Science SARU) received 1 for their single-cour anime series.

MAPPA received the most nominations (9) for an anime studio, with Jujutsu Kaisen received the most but did not win a single award. Wit Studio also holds the record for the most nominations without a single win with 7.

Studio	Wins	Nominations	Seasons
Ufotable	4	5	Demon Slayer: Kimetsu no Yaiba (Unwavering Resolve Arc, Mugen Train Arc, Entertainment District Arc, Swordsmith Village Arc, Hashira Training Arc)
Bones Film	2	7	Gachiakuta, Mob Psycho 100 (Season 1, Season 2, Season 3), My Hero Academia (Season 2, Season 3, Final Season)
MAPPA	1	9	Attack on Titan (The Final Season Part 2, The Final Season The Final Chapters Special 1), Chainsaw Man, The God of High School, Jujutsu Kaisen (Season 1 cour 1, Season 1 cour 2, Season 2), Sarazanmai, Yuri on Ice
Kyoto Animation	1	4	A Silent Voice, Miss Kobayashi's Dragon Maid (Season 1, S), Violet Evergarden
Science SARU	1	4	Dandadan (Season 1, Season 2), Devilman Crybaby, Keep Your Hands Off Eizouken!
A-1 Pictures	1	2	Solo Leveling (Season 1, Arise from the Shadow)
Wit Studio	0	7	Attack on Titan (Season 3), Great Pretender, Kabaneri of the Iron Fortress, Ranking of Kings (cour 2), Spy × Family, Vinland Saga, Vivy: Fluorite Eye's Song
CloverWorks	0	4	Akebi's Sailor Uniform, Fate/Grand Order – Absolute Demonic Front: Babylonia, Spy × Family, Wonder Egg Priority
Orange	0	3	Beastars, Land of the Lustrous, Trigun Stampede
Studio Trigger	0	3	Cyberpunk: Edgerunners, Delicious in Dungeon, Little Witch Academia
