= Dark horse =

Previously less known thing becoming prominent

The horse Shadow Diva at the 2022 Victoria Mile.

A dark horse is a previously lesser-known person, team or other entity that emerges to prominence in a situation, especially in a competition involving multiple rivals, that is unlikely to succeed but has a fighting chance, unlike the underdog who is expected to lose.

The term comes from horse racing and horse betting jargon for any new but promising horse. It has since found usage mostly in other sports, sports betting, and sports journalism and to lesser extent in nascent business environments, such as experimental technology and startup companies.

== Origin ==
The term is suggested to have begun as horse racing parlance for a racehorse that is unknown to gamblers and thus difficult to establish betting odds for.

The first known mention of the concept is in Benjamin Disraeli's novel The Young Duke (1831). Disraeli's protagonist, the Duke of St. James, attends a horse race with a surprise finish: "A dark horse which had never been thought of, and which the careless St. James had never even observed in the list, rushed past the grandstand in sweeping triumph."

== Usage ==
=== Politics ===
The concept has been used in political contexts in countries such as Iran, the Philippines, Russia, Egypt, Finland, Canada, the United Kingdom, and the United States.

Examples of dark horse candidates for the United States presidency include:

- James K. Polk, a relatively unknown Tennessee politician who won the Democratic Party's 1844 presidential nomination over a host of better-known candidates. Polk won the nomination on the ninth ballot at the 1844 Democratic National Convention, and went on to become the country's eleventh president in the 1844 United States presidential election.
- Franklin Pierce, a former US Representative and Senator and practising lawyer who was barely known outside his home state of New Hampshire chosen as the Democratic nominee at the 1852 Democratic National Convention on the 49th ballot over many other known candidates and later elected in the 1852 United States presidential election in a landslide as the fourteenth president over the popular Whig Party nominee, Mexican-American War hero Winfield Scott.
- Abraham Lincoln, a former one-term Representative and a practising lawyer barely known outside his home state of Illinois chosen as the Republican nominee and elected in the 1860 United States presidential election as the sixteenth president over a divided Democratic Party.
- Rutherford B. Hayes, former US Representative and Governor of Ohio elected as the nineteenth president in the 1876 United States presidential election in a highly controversial decision despite losing the popular vote.
- James A. Garfield, elected as the twentieth president in the 1880 United States presidential election; in the beginning of that same year, Garfield was a rising star in the Republican Party but had no interest in the presidency and endorsed John Sherman, the current Secretary of the Treasury. However, the 1880 Republican National Convention became deadlocked due to a split in the delegates between former Republican president Ulysses S. Grant, who was running for a non-consecutive third term, Senator James G. Blaine, and Sherman. The party sought a compromise candidate, and they opted to select Garfield over the latter's objections. Garfield, however, would be assassinated just six months into his term.
- Democrat William Jennings Bryan, a three-term congressman from Nebraska nominated on the fifth ballot after impressing the 1896 Democratic National Convention with his famous Cross of Gold speech that denounced the gold standard and called for bimetallism (Bryan would go on to receive the Democratic presidential nomination twice more in the 1900 and 1908 presidential election respectively and serve as United States Secretary of State under Woodrow Wilson).
- Warren G. Harding, Senator from Ohio, elected as the twenty-ninth president in the 1920 United States presidential election after his surprise nomination in the 1920 Republican National Convention.
- Republican lawyer and businessman Wendell Willkie from Indiana, who was unexpectedly nominated on the sixth ballot at the 1940 Republican National Convention despite never having previously held government office and having only joined the Republican Party a year prior in 1939 after being a lifelong Democrat. Wilkie ultimately lost the election in a landslide to incumbent president Franklin Delano Roosevelt. Wilkie would later run again in the 1944 election but failed to win the nomination after disappointing results in the presidential primaries and suddenly died later that year at the age of 52.
- Harry S. Truman, vice-president and former Senator from Missouri and thirty-third president, was virtually unknown to the American people outside of his home state when he succeeded President Franklin D. Roosevelt in 1945 after Roosevelt's sudden death in office. Truman was considered a lame duck President with no chance of winning against the immensely popular Republican nominee who was New York Governor and former District Attorney of New York County Thomas E. Dewey, yet managed to shock the world by emerging victorious in the 1948 United States presidential election – widely considered one of the biggest upsets in American history but led to the incorrect headline "Dewey Defeats Truman" being published by the Chicago Daily Tribune with incumbent Democratic president Harry S. Truman winning re-election.
- Jimmy Carter, former United States Naval officer, Georgia State Senator and Governor of Georgia elected the thirty-ninth president in 1976 over incumbent president Gerald Ford; in the beginning of that same year, Carter was virtually unknown outside his home state of Georgia but against all odds went on to win the nomination over rivals with more national prominence. Carter’s unexpected victory is widely credited with his campaign platform of presenting himself as an outsider not stained by the horrors of the Watergate scandal which seriously damaged public trust in the presidency. At the 1976 Democratic National Convention Carter made a joke of his obscurity beginning his speech by quipping to the audience "My name is Jimmy Carter, and I'm running for President."
- Donald Trump, former real estate mogul and businessman with no prior military or public service, ran a brash and controversial campaign which won a shocking upset victory in the 2016 United States presidential election against former secretary of state Hillary Clinton to become the 45th president. He then lost his re-election attempt in 2020, but still remained the clear Republican standard-bearer. Four years later, Trump again secured another upset win in the 2024 United States presidential election against Democratic nominee Kamala Harris to become the 47th president.

In Peru, "dark horse" candidates who won include Alberto Fujimori, who defeated Mario Vargas Llosa in the 1990 election, and Pedro Castillo, a previously unknown elementary school teacher, who won the 2021 election. In the United Kingdom, Jeremy Corbyn was considered a "dark horse" candidate when he ran for the 2015 Labour Party leadership election; despite struggling to secure enough nominations from the Parliamentary Labour Party to stand as a candidate, he won the leadership in a landslide. In Venezuela, then-President of the National Assembly Juan Guaidó was described as "the accidental leader" of the Venezuelan opposition; he declared himself acting president in 2019, during the Venezuelan presidential crisis. In Turkey, Ekrem İmamoğlu was little-known before his victory in the 2019 Istanbul mayoral election. In Iran, Masoud Pezeshkian, a little-known "dark horse" candidate, was allowed to run by the Guardian Council and won a surprising victory in the second round of the 2024 Iranian presidential election.

=== Sport ===
The term has been used in sport to describe teams and athletes who unexpectedly outperformed their expectations in a competition. Examples include the Los Angeles Kings during the 2012 Stanley Cup playoffs (who placed 1st despite being an 8th-seed entry into the playoffs); Bulgaria at the 1994 FIFA World Cup; Croatia at the 1998 FIFA World Cup and 2018 FIFA World Cup (who placed 2nd despite being ranked 20th in the FIFA World Rankings), Morocco at the 2022 FIFA World Cup (who placed 4th despite being ranked 23rd in the FIFA World Rankings); and Turkey at the 2002 FIFA World Cup (who placed 3rd despite being ranked 31st in the FIFA World Rankings).

=== Media ===
The term has been also used in films, television series and video games for award seasons to describe then-unknowingly artists, filmmakers and game developers who beating out fellow competitors that heavily favoured to win, most notably the Academy Awards and D.I.C.E. Awards. For example:

- An early dark horse candidate of the Academy Awards was Cecil B. DeMille’s circus epic The Greatest Show on Earth, won the Academy Award for Best Picture over the frontrunners Fred Zinnemann’s western High Noon and John Ford’s romantic comedy-drama The Quiet Man. Despite their upsets, the Academy defended their decision for DeMille that it likely his only personal Oscar win.
- Marisa Tomei, an underdog candidate, unexpectedly won the Academy Award for Best Supporting Actress for her comedic performance in My Cousin Vinny – previously considered the least likely to win.
- A Palme d'Or-winning South Korean black comedy film Parasite unexpectedly won the Academy Award for Best Picture over a WWI adventure film 1917, the former made the first for a non-English-language film to win Best Picture.
- A puzzle stealth game Untitled Goose Game won the D.I.C.E. Award for Game of the Year, a rare feat for an independent video game, over AAA games Control and Outer Wilds.
- Crunchyroll Anime Awards is notoriously known for unexpectedly awarding the Anime of the Year or other categories to lesser-known anime series over fan-favorite competitors. In an inauguration edition, MAPPA's yaoi sports Yuri on Ice made the highest "clean sweep" with all of its seven nominations including Anime of the Year over My Hero Academia – considered one of the biggest upsets in the anime industry. A similar occurrence has been made in the following editions, such as the video game-adapted anime series Cyberpunk: Edgerunners and the manhwa series Solo Leveling notoriously won the Anime of the Year with their respective editions.
- Dara won the Eurovision Song Contest 2026 for Bulgaria for the first time, despite being 15th in the odds after the rehearsals.

== See also ==
- Black swan theory
- Stalking horse
- Underdog
