= Gachiakuta =

Japanese manga series

- First tankōbon volume cover, featuring Rudo Surebrec

ガチアクタ
- Genre: Action; Dark fantasy; Dystopian
- Manga
- Written by: Kei Urana
- Published by: Kodansha
- English publisher: NA: Kodansha USA
- Imprint: Shōnen Magazine Comics
- Magazine: Weekly Shōnen Magazine
- Original run: February 16, 2022 – present
- Volumes: 19
- Anime television series
- Directed by: Fumihiko Suganuma
- Produced by: Naoki Amano; Hirotsugu Ogo; Isao Tagai; Tomohiro Shibata; Wataru Tanaka
- Written by: Hiroshi Seko
- Music by: Taku Iwasaki
- Studio: Bones Film
- Licensed by: Crunchyroll; SEA: Medialink
- Original network: JNN (CBC, TBS); AT-X, BS NTV
- English network: US: Adult Swim (Toonami)
- Original run: July 6, 2025 – present
- Episodes: 24
- icon

Gachiakuta (/ˌɡɑːtʃiˈɑːktə/ gah-chee-AHK-tah) (Japanese: ガチアクタ; rgh. 'Legit Trash') is a Japanese manga series written and illustrated by Kei Urana. It has been serialized in Kodansha's shōnen manga magazine Weekly Shōnen Magazine since February 2022, with its chapters collected in 19 tankōbon volumes as of July 2026. The series follows Rudo Surebrec, a young teenage boy who is falsely accused of murder and is thrown into a vast wasteland. Seeking revenge against his accusers, he reluctantly joins a group of ground-dwelling people who use weapons known as "Vital Instruments" in battle.

The manga was adapted into an anime television series produced by Bones Film. The first season aired from July to December 2025, and a second season has been announced. A stage play was also produced, and a video game is in development.

Gachiakuta won the 50th Kodansha Manga Award in the shōnen category in 2026.

== Synopsis ==
=== Setting ===
Gachiakuta is set in a dystopian world, in which a floating country-sized structure known as the Sphere (天界, Tenkai) exists. The Sphere runs on a social caste that divides the rich and wealthy upper class from the poor "tribesfolk" living around the outer perimeter by way of a heavily guarded wall. The tribesfolk are descended from criminals and shunned by the upper class. Both sides of the caste wantonly discard anything they consider to be trash into the "Pit", a never-ending expanse below the Sphere, which is littered with waste and considered inhospitable to life by the Spherites (天界人, Tenkai Jin), the inhabitants of the Sphere. Anyone accused and convicted of a crime is also thrown into the Pit as a form of capital punishment. The Sphere and the Pit are separated by a mysterious border.

Unknown to the Spherites, the Pit is actually inhabited by a wide population who refer to the Pit as the "Ground" (下界, Gekai) and have formed a network of civilizations. The Ground is a mostly toxic environment infested with the Spherites' waste due to the constant downpour of trash from the Sphere, and its heavily polluted areas are populated by transformed creatures known as Trash Beasts (斑獣, Han-jū), born from Anima (思念, Shinen) energy accumulated from thoughts and emotion. Regular weapons are ineffective on Trash Beasts due to their regenerative properties. They can only be defeated by superpowered people known as "Givers" (人通者(ギバー), Gibā), who have formed teams known collectively as the Cleaners (掃除屋, Sōjiya) and wield weapons known as Vital Instruments (人器, Jinki) in battle, as only these can affect Trash Beasts.

Vital Instruments are everyday objects that have been infused with Anima generated from the Giver's body. They manifest from the Giver's own love for the object, allowing their Anima to awaken and transform the object into a specialized weapon. The longer a Giver has cared for that object, the more powerful it becomes as a Vital Instrument, as it also serves as a conduit for a Giver's own experience and ideology as a person. Among the many Vital Instruments are those in the Watchman Series (番人シリーズ, Bannin Shirīzu), which are supposedly especially powerful and usually require the wielder to have lost something in their life to use them without succumbing to insanity. This series is believed to be connected to the Watchman (番人, Bannin), a gigantic, incomprehensible being guarding the border between the Sphere and the Ground.

=== Plot ===
Rudo Surebrec lives with his foster father, Regto, in the slums of the Sphere. Regto took Rudo in after his biological father, a notorious serial killer, was thrown into the Pit. Rudo detests the upper class's wastefulness, as they frequently discard anything they deem to be trash, even new or unused items. To this end, he spends his days rummaging through dump sites to salvage and often sell such items.

One day, after looking over the execution site, Rudo encounters a mysterious passerby before returning home to find Regto murdered. Apprehended at the scene, Rudo is immediately convicted of killing Regto, due to his status as a tribesman. Unable to escape his fate, Rudo swears revenge upon his accusers as he is dumped into the Pit.

Upon awakening, Rudo finds himself disoriented in an endless landscape of trash. He is attacked by large creatures made of trash but is rescued by a man named Enjin, who explains to Rudo that he has fallen to the surface from the Sphere. After testing him and awakening his power as a Giver, Enjin invites Rudo to join the Cleaners, teams of Givers who use their Vital Instruments to battle the trash beasts. Rudo reluctantly accepts Enjin's offer, so long as it helps accomplish his ultimate goal.

== Production ==
Series creator Kei Urana credits experiences in her childhood as the main inspiration for Gachiakuta. The story's premise, where actions and feelings are imbued into personal belongings as "Anima", developed after Urana broke a belonging of her own as a child: "I had a pen that I really loved, and I broke it in two. Along with the sense of loss, I had a feeling like the pen was pleading with me". Urana's experience is reflected in Gachiakuta as the story focuses on many characters who explore strong, personal connections to Anima-imbued objects called "Vital Instruments", and in Rudo's case, even trash thrown away by others. The idea for these Vital Instruments also originated in Urana's youth from observing the hangers that came with her grandmother's dry cleaning, a testament to Gachiakuta's themes about seeing value and potential in seemingly mundane and discarded things.

Gachiakuta's art style is due to illustrations by Urana, complemented by graffiti designs from Ando Hideyoshi. Graffiti and street art provide not only avenues for expression, distinction, and safety for the story's characters, but also narrative significance for readers due to its use in storytelling. As for character design, Urana states that her process involved unexpected changes for Gachiakuta's characters: "I create them to be decent people, but then I actually draw them and for some reason, they turn out to be freaky weirdos. I've given up, realizing that this is who they truly are".

== Media ==
=== Manga ===
Written and illustrated by Kei Urana with graffiti designs by Hideyoshi Ando, the series began serialization in Kodansha's shōnen manga magazine Weekly Shōnen Magazine on February 16, 2022. As of July 2026, its individual chapters have been collected in 19 tankōbon volumes.

In August 2022, Urana stated an "overseas version" was in production. In March 2023, Kodansha USA announced that they licensed the series for English publication.

==== Volumes ====
No.	Original release date	Original ISBN	English release date	English ISBN
1	May 17, 2022	978-4-06-527922-9	January 16, 2024	979-8-88877-020-7
1. "The Sphere" (天界, Tenkai); 2. "Quasi Living Things" (生物もどき, Seibutsu Modoki); 3. "Imbued" (宿り物, Yadori-mono); 4. "The Ground" (下界, Gekai)
Young scavenger Rudo Surebec struggles to survive in the slums where the elite Spherites dispose of their waste. He is mocked for his tribal origin, as his father was a serial killer executed the Pit. One day, Rudo witnesses the murder of his adoptive father Regto, and is falsely accused of said crime, leading him to be sentenced to the Pit, a vast garbage wasteland. Swearing vengeance against the Spherites, Rudo is rescued from Trash Beasts by a mysterious Cleaner named Enjin. He takes Rudo to a truck stop where he confronts traffickers as a test to awaken his latent powers. Finding he is a Giver, a person that can grant objects life as Vital Instruments like him, Enjin recruits him into the Cleaners, an organization that takes on the Trash Beasts. Remembering that said objects once had souls, Rudo wonders about returning to the Sphere with them. As a cat steals Rudo's moneybag, he catches it with a staff belonging to another Cleaner.
2	July 15, 2022	978-4-06-528430-8	April 30, 2024	979-8-88877-094-8
5. "Interpersonal Relations" (対人, Taijin); 6. "Dookie-ing It Out" ("大"勝負, "Dai" Shōbu); 7. "Cleaner HQ" (掃除屋本部, Sōjiya Honbu); 8. "Observation Field Trip" (お仕事見学, Oshigoto Kengaku); 9. "Not at Home" (アウェイ, Awei); 10. "Drawing Near" (迫り来る, Semari Kuru); 11. "Getting Closer" (接近, Sekkin); 12. "Shadows on the Ground" (下界の影, Gekai no Kage); 13. "Raiders" (荒らし屋, Arashi-ya)
3	September 16, 2022	978-4-06-529138-2	July 23, 2024	979-8-88877-095-5
14. "Arrival" (到達, Tōtatsu); 15. "Deep Down" (根本, Konpon); 16. "It's a Hit!!" (ちゃんとした一撃ィ!!, Chanto Shita Ichigekii!!); 17. "Stabby Stabby Claws" (攻め攻め爪, Seme Seme Tsume); 18. "Hysterical" (わや, Waya); 19. "An Uncommon Front" (歪共闘, Ibitsu Kyōtō); 20. "Ended" (決着, Ketchaku); 21. "Resentment and Appreciation" (遺恨とねぎらい, Ikon to Negirai); 22. "Moving Forward" (前進, Zenshin)
4	November 17, 2022	978-4-06-529777-3	October 29, 2024	979-8-88877-096-2
23. "Favorite Treat" (好物, Kōbutsu); 24. "Rudo's Vital Instrument: P.S. He Went on a Diet" (ルド人器 P.S.ダイエットしました, Rudo Jinki: P.S. Daietto Shimashita); 25. "Before We Go" (行く前, Iku Mae); 26. "The City of Graffiti" (ラクガキの町, Rakugaki no Machi); 27. "Worthy Successor" (引き継ぐに値するモノ, Hikitsugu ni Ataisuru Mono); 28. "Picture-Drawing and Trash-Picking" (描きと拾い, Egaki to Hiroi); 29. "Penta: The Desert No Man's Land" (砂漠の禁域『ペンタ』, Sabaku no Kin'iki "Penta"); 30. "Penta: VWHRRR KA-SNIFF" (ドルルガスン, Doruru Gasun); 31. "Visitors" (来客, Raikyaku)
5	February 17, 2023	978-4-06-530527-0	January 21, 2025	979-8-88877-097-9
32. "Amo's Hospitality" (アモのもてなし, Amo no Motenashi); 33. "Illusion" (幻影, Gen'ei); 34. "A Familiar Fragrance" (なつかしい かほり, Natsukashii Kahori); 35. "Happy Times" (幸せ時間, Shiawase Jikan); 36. "Tamsy Winds Up" (タムジー巻き, Tamujī Maki); 37. "Forgot" (ワスレテタ。, Wasureteta.); 38. "Something Like a Curse" (呪いのようなものかしら, Noroi no Yō na Mono Kashira); 39. "What Is Right?" (正しさとは, Tadashi Sato wa); 40. "Rising Abyss" (昇る深淵, Noboru Shin'en)
6	April 17, 2023	978-4-06-531344-2	April 22, 2025	979-8-88877-152-5
41. "Alighting Fragments" (虚の瞳, Kara no Hitomi); 42. "Alighting Fragments 2" (降り立つ断片, Oritatsu Danpen); 43. "Gains" (収穫, Shūkaku); 44. "Be Extra Wary on the Journey Home" (帰路こそ気を抜くなし, Kiro koso Ki o Nuku Nashi); 45. "Pest Control" (害虫駆除, Gaichū Kujo); 46. "The Storm Before the Storm" (嵐の前の嵐, Arashi no Mae no Arashi); 47. "Boss" (ドン, Don); 48. "Clash!" (ぶつかれ, Butsukare); 49. "Ready, Set..." (いざ, Iza)
7	July 14, 2023	978-4-06-532179-9	July 22, 2025	979-8-88877-157-0
50. "Glubroachie" (ゴボゴッキー, Gobogokkī); 51. "Hey, For Real" (なぁマジ, Naa Maji); 52. "Exchange" (交換, Gōkan); 53. "Do You Even Have Eyes?" (見る目あんのか, Mirume An no Ka); 54. "Gifted and Not" (天と凡, Ten to Bon); 55. "The Difference" (差, Sa); 56. "The Reason I Fight" (戦う理由, Tatakau no Riyū); 57. "Memories of an Average Joe" (凡の記憶, Bon no Kioku); 58. "Inferiority of an Average Joe" (凡の劣等, Bon no Rettō)
8	October 17, 2023	978-4-06-532888-0	October 21, 2025	979-8-88877-283-6
59. "Determination of an Average Joe" (凡の決意, Bon no Ketsui); 60. "Reality" (現実, Genjitsu); 61. "Oh ZAP" (ヤバビリ, Yababiri); 62. "Totes Legit" (バリガチ, Barigachi); 63. "Hidden" (裏, Ura); 64. "Past" (前職, Zenshoku); 65. "As a Byproduct" (副産物の中, Fukusanbutsu no Naka); 66. "The Watchman Series" (番人シリーズ, Bannin Shirīzu); 67. "Are You Kidding Me?" (まぁぁぁあじ, Maaaaaji)
9	December 15, 2023	978-4-06-533899-5	January 20, 2026	979-8-88877-284-3
68. "Kids Are Tougher Than You Think!" (子供なめんじゃねぇ, Kodomo Namen ja nee); 69. "Midair Road Trip" (空中ドライビン, Kūchū Doraibin); 70. "Ensign" (印, Shirushi); 71. "Evolution" (進化, Shinka); 72. "And Bullseye" (ドンピシャリ, Donpishari); 73. "Race Against Time" (TIME ATTACK); 74. "Power Up" (強化, Kyōka); 75. "Loose Cannon" (無鉄砲, Muteppō); 76. "Beast, Break Through" (突破して獣, Toppa Shite Kemono)
10	March 15, 2024	978-4-06-534863-5	April 21, 2026	979-8-88877-447-2
77. "Accumulation of Feelings" (思いの蓄積, Omoi no Chikuseki); 78. "The Woman Left Behind" (留めた女, Todometa Onna); 79. "Loss and Big Entrance" (喪失と出番, Sōshitsu to Deban); 80. "The Power of Protection" (守護の力, Shugo no Chikara); 81. "No Time For Rest" (矢継ぎ, Yatsugi); 82. "Rest" (休, Kyū); 83. "The Man Who Will Be Stronger" (強くなる男, Tsuyoku Naru Otoko); 84. "A Man Who Knows" (知る男, Shiru Otoko); 85. "Field Trip" (遠足, Ensoku)
11	June 17, 2024	978-4-06-535779-8	July 21, 2026	979-8-88877-448-9
86. "Contact" (接触, Sesshoku); 87. "Ancestry" (先祖, Senzo); 88. "I Want to Eat Cake" (ケーキを食べたいの, Kēki o Tabetai no); 89. "Finding Information" (情報探し, Jōhō Sagashi); 90. "Completion and Arms" (完成と標的, Kansei to Hyōteki); 91. "Multiple Purchases" (重なる品物, Kasanaru Shinamono); 92. "Tamsy's Day Off" (タム休, Tamu Kyū); 93. "Kuro the Information Broker" (情報屋"クロ", Jōhō-ya "Kuro"); 94. "On Your Mark"
12	September 17, 2024	978-4-06-536774-2	September 22, 2026	979-8-88877-536-3
95. "Hi There!" (こんにちは～, Konnichiwā); 96. "Three-Way Battle, Give or Take" (三つ巴+α, Mitsudomoe Purasu Arufa); 97. "Two Hands" (2つの手, Futatsu no Te); 98. "Scum's Struggle" (カスの足掻き, Kasu no Agaki); 99. "That's How You're Gonna Play It?" (そう来たか, Sō Kita ka); 100. "Tori: The Forest No Man's Land" (ジャングルの禁域『トリ』, Janguru no Kin'iki "Tori"); 101. "King" (主, Omo); 102. "I'm A Cleaner, Too" (オレだって, Oredatte); 103. "The Box" (箱, Hako)
13	December 17, 2024	978-4-06-537775-8	November 24, 2026	979-8-88877-579-0
104. "The Box" (箱, Hako); 105. "Behold What It Holds" (中身初見, Nakami Hatsumi); 106. "Lurkers" (潜む者, Hisomu Mono); 107. "Elder" (長老, Chōrō); 108. "Stay Out of Our Way, Seriously" (邪魔すんなまじで, Jama Sun na Majide); 109. "Amo's Whereabouts. And..." (アモの所在。そしてーー, Amo no Shozai. Soshite...); 110. "An Act of ****" (〇〇の所業, ** no Tokoro-gyō); 111. "False Face" (嘘の顔, Uso no Kao); 112. "Unboxing" (開封, Kaifū)
14	March 17, 2025	978-4-06-538707-8	January 12, 2027	979-8-88877-653-7
113. "A Vague Identity" (曖昧な正体, Aimaina Shōtai); 114. "Flailin'" (わちゃわちゃ, Wacha Wacha); 115. "The Cleaners" (掃除屋, Sōjiya); 116. "Rudo Surebrec the Cleaner" (掃除屋ルド・シュアブレック, Sōjiya Rudo Shuaburekku); 117. "The Hero of the Story" (主人公, Shujinkō); 118. "Oozing" (滲み, Nijimi); 119. "First Job!" (初依頼!, Hatsu Irai!); 120. "The Sun Sets" (日が沈む, Hi ga Shizumu); 121. "Darkness Falls" (暗転, Anten)
15	June 17, 2025	978-4-06-539758-9	—	—
122. "Explosion" (爆発, Bakuhatsu); 123. "True Colors" (本性, Honshō); 124. "Me Too" (オレも, Ore Mo); 125. "The Fate of the Faceless Mob" (モブの運命, Mobu no Unmei); 126. "Ask Your Soul" (魂に問う, Tamashī ni Tou); 127. "Explosion Reprise" (爆発・改, Bakuhatsu Kai); 128. "Follo Reprise" (フォロ・改, Furo Kai); 129. "Joining the Team" (加入, Kanyū); 130. "Preparation" (支度, Shitaku)
16	September 17, 2025	978-4-06-540378-5	—	—
131. "Requesting Leave" (休暇届, Kyūka Todoke); 132. "The Doll Festival" (ドールフェスティバル, Dōru Fesutibaru); 133. "Too Lily" (トゥー・リリー, Tū Rirī); 134. "Showtime!!" (ショータイム!!, Shōtaimu!!); 135. "Meet and Greet" (ご挨拶, Go Aisatsu); 136. "Special Delivery" (配達物, Haitatsumono); 137. "The Real Doll Festival" (本当の"ドールフェスティバル", Hontō no "Dōru Fesutibaru"); 138. "Supreme" (崇高, Sūkō); 139. "Mymo the Ruler" (支配者マイモー, Shihaisha Maimō)
17	November 17, 2025	978-4-06-541550-4	—	—
140. "Weakness" (弱点, Jakuten Ichi); 141. "Hands" (手, Te); 142. "Experience Points" (経験値, Keikenchi); 143. "Danger" (デンジャー, Denjā); 144. "Simple" (シンプル, Shinpuru); 145. "Skadoosh" (デュクシ, Dyukushi); 146. "Have a Ball" (タマ, Tama); 147. "Weakness" (弱味, Yowami); 148. "Connection" (繋, Tsunagi); 149. "Vital Instrument "Connect"" (人器〝コネクト〟, Hitoki "Konekuto")
18	February 17, 2026	978-4-06-542626-5	—	—
150. "Wait for Me" (待ってて, Mattete); 151. "Something Inhuman" (人ではない"ナニカ", Hitode Wanai "Nanika"); 152. "Locking Eyes with Stranger Things" (異質と目が合う時, Ishitsu to me ga au Toki); 153. "Flame" (炎, Honō); 154. "What You Can Do" (できる事, Dekiru Koto); 155. "The Source of Power" (力の根源, Chikara no Kongen); 156. "The Ancient Rulers" (旧支配者, Kyū Shihai-sha); 157. "The Reason for Reliance" (依恃の理由, Yorishi no Riyū); 158. "The Kind and The Gentle Avenger" (優しき復讐者, Yasashiki Fukushū-sha); 159. "Daily Hire" (日雇いバイト, Hiyatoi Baito); 160. "Opening" (隙, Suki)
19	July 16, 2026	978-4-06-543608-0	—	—
161. "Opening" (隙, Suki); 162. "Grandpa!!" (じいちゃーん!!, Jīchan!!); 162.2. "Payback" (報い, Mukui); 163. "Sixth Sense"; 164. "The Sixth" (6つ目, Muttsu-me); 165. "A Name" (名付け, Nazuke); 166. "Obsession" (執着, Shūchaku); 167. "Chimaira"; 168. "The Curtain Closes" (閉幕, Heimaku); 169. "Red" (赤, Aka)

==== Chapters not yet in tankōbon format ====
- 170. "A Bolt from the Blue" (一鳴驚人, Ichi Naru Odoroki Hito)
- 171. "A Living Hell" (生き地獄じゃ, Iki Jigoku ja)
- 172. "United by Fate" (合縁奇縁, Aienkien)
- 173. "Forget Something?" (忘れ物, Wasuremono)
- 174. "Past the Limit" (超えた先, Koeta Saki)
- 175. "Cleaning the Cleaners" (掃除屋掃除, Sōjiya Sōji)

=== Anime ===
The anime television series is produced by Bones Film and directed by Fumihiko Suganuma, with Hiroshi Seko handling series composition and episode screenplays, Satoshi Ishino as chief animation director and character designer, and Taku Iwasaki as music composer. The series aired from July 6 to December 22, 2025, on the Agaru Anime programming block on all JNN affiliates, including CBC and TBS, and ran for two consecutive cours. Prior to the television airing, the series received advanced screenings in more than 15 countries worldwide under the title Gachiakuta: World Takeover, starting with the world premiere event at the Shinjuku Piccadilly in Shinjuku on July 4 of the same year. For the first cours, the opening theme song is "Hugs", performed by Paledusk, while the ending theme song is "Tomoshibi" (灯火), performed by Dustcell. For the second cours, the opening theme song is "Let's Just Crash", performed by Mori Calliope, while the ending theme song is "Ban" (番), performed by Karanoah.

After the finale of the first season, a second season was announced.

Crunchyroll is streaming the series. Medialink licensed the series in Southeast Asia for streaming on Ani-One Asia YouTube channel. The English dub for the series began broadcasting on Adult Swim's Toonami programming block on October 18, 2026.

==== Episodes ====
No.	Title	Directed by	Storyboarded by	Original release date	English air date
1	"The Sphere"; Transliteration: "Tenkai" (Japanese: 天界)	Ikurō Satō	Fumihiko Suganuma	July 6, 2025	October 18, 2026
In a class-divided world, the elite Sphereites dispose of their waste into the slums below, where the young scavenger Rudo struggles to survive. As a tribesfolk, descended from criminals, he endures mockery for his father's violent past, a serial killer executed in the Pit. Rudo conceals a painful affliction in his hands, alleviated only by gloves from his adoptive father, Regto. After gifting his crush Chiwa a stuffed toy, he returns home to find a masked intruder stabbing Regto and stealing a book. With his dying breath, Regto urges Rudo to change the unjust world. Falsely accused of the murder, Rudo is sentenced to the Pit while the tribesfolk taunt him as trash. Even Chiwa betrays him, coldly declaring him the son of a murderer before discarding his gift. Devastated, Rudo condemns both the tribesfolk and Sphereites as equally corrupt, swearing vengeance against the killer, the elite, and the slum-dwellers. Cast into the Pit, he awakens in a wasteland of garbage, only to face immediate attack by a monstrous Trash Beast.
2	"The Inhabited"; Transliteration: "Yadori-mono" (Japanese: 宿り物)	Satoshi Nakagawa	Fumihiko Suganuma	July 13, 2025	October 25, 2026
After witnessing a criminal's execution in the Ground and hearing slurs against the impure tribes, Rudo flees from Trash Beasts, questioning their origin. Discovering a buried skull, he curses the Sphereites for exiling him, then sees a vision of Regto, hardening his resolve. A Mysterious Man watches as Rudo attacks but collapses from the toxic air. The stranger saves him, destroying the beasts with an umbrella. Awakening, Rudo is given a mask by the man, who reveals himself as Enjin, a Cleaner. After restraining Rudo, Enjin dismisses his pleas to return to the Sphere, instead taking him to a truck stop. Locals, recognizing Rudo as a Sphereite, feign friendliness before capturing him for trafficking. Forced to eat trash, Rudo bites off two of the captor's fingers and fights back until Enjin stops him. Enjin reveals the ordeal was a test for latent power, offering knowledge of the Ground in exchange for joining the Cleaners: Rudo refuses.
3	"The Ground"; Transliteration: "Gekai" (Japanese: 下界)	Nao Miyoshi	Jong Heo	July 27, 2025	November 8, 2026
After bringing Rudo to a doctor in the Ground, Enjin reveals the boy is a Giver: someone who can breathe life into objects. He scouts Rudo for the Cleaners, an organization that defeats creatures born from garbage. Rudo recalls his father Regto once said objects have souls and wonders if joining could help him return to the Sphere. Enjin admits he does not know the way back but suggests the Cleaners' boss might. When Enjin departs, a cat steals Rudo's money pouch. Chasing it, Rudo seizes a stick to pin it down, but the weapon belongs to fellow Cleaner and Giver Zanka Nijiku. Rudo apologizes, remembering his father's advice to respect others' feelings. Zanka surprisingly responds with an apology and a smile, until he realizes Rudo's "weapon" is a filthy toilet plunger. Horrified, Zanka tries to flee, but a confused Rudo unleashes a humiliating barrage. Enjin later collects the two battered boys. In his car, a lively girl named Riyo appears, teasing Rudo about his unusual hair and flustering him completely.
4	"Cleaner HQ"; Transliteration: "Sōjiya Honbu" (Japanese: 掃除屋本部)	Masayuki Otsuki	Atsushi Takahashi	August 3, 2025	November 15, 2026
Enjin drives Rudo to the Cleaners' headquarters, a towering building marked by twisted street lamps. Inside, Rudo meets Semiu, the receptionist whose glasses reveal a person's true nature. Shocked by what she sees, she insists he still needs training. Since the boss is away, Riyo suggests Rudo observe her on a mission. Semiu briefs them: a nearby town near a polluted zone has requested aid against emerging trash beasts. She explains the Ground consists of safe zones and polluted zones, the latter crawling with trash beasts. Accompanied by Supporters Gris, Follo, and Tomme, Rudo and Riyo head to the site. A herd of trash beasts attacks, and Riyo calmly activates her scissors, the Ripper. When Follo is targeted, Rudo instinctively awakens a metal pipe as a vital instrument, saving him. A massive beast appears, strangely resilient until Riyo pierces its glowing weak point, revealing a vital instrument inside the creature. Elsewhere, Rudo's old kidnapper awakens, questioned coldly about the missing Sphereite.
5	"Raiders"; Transliteration: "Arashi-ya" (Japanese: 荒らし屋)	Yukihiko Asaki	Jong Heo	August 10, 2025	November 22, 2026
A lively welcome party is held for Rudo at Cleaners headquarters. Still shaken from the previous day's raid, he sits apart until Gris thanks him for saving Follo, moving Rudo to tears with his gratitude and advice. Enjin, Riyo, and Zanka then invite him to join the celebration, and Rudo feels comforted by his growing circle of friends. Elsewhere, one of Rudo's kidnappers is slain by a cold, purple-eyed man. Back at HQ, Semiu answers a merchant's request for help recovering cargo stolen by a trash beast: a Sphereite. Zanka leads the team, with Rudo insisting on joining. The merchant offers to guide them, but Zanka remains suspicious. Inside the beast's lair, the floor collapses, separating the Cleaners. Two Raiders confront them, specifically targeting Rudo. Gris and Follo get him to safety while Zanka battles the ambushers, defeating them with his staff. However, the purple-eyed Raider closes in, intent on claiming Rudo.
6	"One Good Strike!!"; Transliteration: "Chanto Shita Ichigekii!!" (Japanese: ちゃんとした一撃ィ!!)	Ikurō Satō	Jong Heo	August 17, 2025	November 29, 2026
Gris, Follo, Rudo, and the support staff reach the exit, but the deranged Raider pursuing them blocks their escape, demolishing the doorway. He casually states someone wants to meet Rudo and, when asked, assures them Zanka is alive, though just barely. Summoning his clawed vital instrument, he demands Rudo surrender. Gris shields the boy, but the Raider pierces his side, declaring him already dead as Gris's cherished talisman falls free. Shock grips Rudo, and the world turns monochrome. A memory surfaces of his adoptive father Regto encouraging him to find joy, which he discovered in salvaging discarded items and recognizing their hidden value. Returning to the present, Gris's talisman triggers Rudo's Anima. He manifests a massive floating totem embodying Gris's prayers, which grants him an impenetrable defense. The Raider introduces himself as Jabber and lunges, but his strikes fail against the barrier while Rudo counterattacks with relentless punches. Jabber collapses, yet using the neurotoxin in his claws, Mankira, he severs his own conscious thought. Though unconscious, his body rises again, moving on pure instinct.
7	"A Score to Settle"; Transliteration: "Ketchaku" (Japanese: 決着)	Koji Nagatomi	Atsushi Takahashi	August 24, 2025	December 6, 2026
Jabber's unconscious body moves autonomously. To protect the injured Gris and Follo, Rudo lures him away but is caught by his blades. A poisoned Zanka intervenes, feigning an attack on Rudo to use the talisman's repelling force against Jabber, jolting him awake. As Zanka collapses and Rudo's vital instrument shatters, Rudo also succumbs to poison. Jabber impales himself, hoists Rudo over his shoulder, and escapes through the ceiling. Riyo and other Cleaners arrive, and Enjin frees Rudo by slamming Jabber into a wall. Jabber refuses to retreat until fellow raider Cthoni informs him their boss was pleased. A poisoned Rudo vows to continue their fight, and Jabber reveals their leader possesses a symbol from the same "series" as Rudo's gloves before escaping through a portal. The Support staff stabilizes Gris, and Rudo apologizes for breaking the talisman, receiving Gris's assurance that he is glad it was of use.
8	"Moving Forward"; Transliteration: "Zenshin" (Japanese: 前進)	Himari Tamagawa & Kenji Mizuhata	Takuya Igarashi	August 31, 2025	TBA
A despondent Rudo is consoled by Enjin after failing to save Gris, only to discover the injured man was healed by Giver Eishia Stilza's rare vital instrument. Leader Arkha Corvus officially welcomes Rudo, then questions how he alone survived crossing the lethal border to the Sphere, mentioning rumors of other survivors. Rudo resolves to find them, but Enjin insists he first train for the dangers of No Man's Land. After a confrontation with the aggressive Cleaner Dear, Zanka helps Rudo discover his unique ability to activate multiple broken objects with his gloves without destroying them. Elsewhere, Raiders Jabber and Cthoni report to their leader, who identifies the symbol on Rudo's gloves as belonging to the "Watchman series", which also appears on his own armor.
9	"The City of Graffiti"; Transliteration: "Rakugaki no Machi" (Japanese: ラクガキの町)	Hyūga Yamamura	Jong Heo	September 7, 2025	TBA
After washing his treasured gloves, Rudo finds Riyo lying on his bed, as she entered through his window after hearing him in pain from her room above; the next day, Enjin and Gris observe the Cleaners' resident artist crafting Rudo's full face mask, which Corvus explains is essential for venturing into No Man's Land, necessitating further preparations including a visit to a Giver in Canvas Town for a protective spell. The full team of Givers—Riyo, Zanka, Delmon, Tamsy, and Enjin—and Supporters—Follo, Gris, and Tomme—gather for the journey, and upon arriving in Canvas Town, a literal canvas for its residents' creativity, they learn from the mayor that the Giver Gob has died from body pollution but chose a successor, a young non-binary individual named Remlin Tysark; overcoming their grief, Remlin seizes Gob's pen, runs to the roof, and joyfully casts their first spell, transforming spray cans into endless fireworks that light up the city, prompting the mayor to apologize for the subsequent delay in obtaining the protective spell, which Enjin accepts without complaint.
10	"Penta: The Desert No Man's Land"; Transliteration: "Sabaku no Kin'iki "Penta"" (Japanese: 砂漠の禁域『ペンタ』)	Shotaro Kamiyama	Atsushi Takahashi	September 14, 2025	TBA
Remlin, the new spellcaster of Canvas Town, finally has a moment to draw a spell on Rudo and the other Cleaners, after that, Back at headquarters, the overexcited artist August shouts with joy that Rudo's full-face mask is done. As the Cleaners team gets ready to head out on their mission, Enjin tells Rudo to hold out his new choker. Each Cleaner draws blood from their own thumb and places a drop on the choker, to Rudo's shock. It's what allows them to communicate through the device. Finally, the team is ready to venture into the No Man's Land (known as Penta) where the red dunes of the Penta desert are not made of sand, but of garbage that's worn down into dust, to find the woman who has witnessed travelers moving between the Ground and the Sphere, after fighting the scorpion-like trash beasts, a young girl wearing oversized boots—and no mask—approaches the Cleaners. Soft-spoken, she asks the group if they have come to visit Amo. Zanka thinks it's too easy if they found who they were looking for so quickly. Riyo asks her bluntly if she is the one who has seen travelers come and go, and the girl says she is. She invites them inside to talk away from the polluted air. Enjin says confidently that they will all go, and he will be the one to take her on if it turns into a fight, however, Enjin collapsing on the floor with drool pouring from his mouth. The girl watches with a sly smile with Rudo in shock.
11	"Amo's Hospitality"; Transliteration: "Amo no Motenashi" (Japanese: アモのもてなし)	Yukihiko Asaki	Jong Heo	September 21, 2025	TBA
Following Amo's directive, the Cleaners accompany her to her residence in No Man's Land, a remarkably preserved tower that pierces the sky. At the peak, Rudo asks about travel between the Ground and the Sphere, but Amo deflects with a question about his preferences in women. Enjin interrupts, accusing her of using flirtation as a bargaining tool, which agitates Amo. She activates her boots, and Enjin is ambushed from behind by Delmon. Amo taunts the group and, displeased by their silence, berates them. While Zanka tends to Enjin, Delmon threatens his teammates to protect Amo. Rudo then experiences a hallucination, seeing Amo as Chiwa, the girl who betrayed him. Amo explains she is using a scent that causes individuals to perceive her as someone they love. As Zanka and Tamsy don gas masks, a conflicted Rudo instinctively moves to protect the hallucinatory image of Chiwa-Amo. With other teammates joining the fight to defend her, Tamsy reluctantly prepares to use his vital instrument against his friends.
12	"Something Like a Curse"; Transliteration: "Noroi no Yō na Mono Kashira" (Japanese: 呪いのようなものかしら)	Takanori Yano	Takuya Igarashi	September 28, 2025	TBA
While Delmon is lost in a memory of his wife and a flower-covered home, Zanka and Tamsy face teammates who perceive Amo as a loved one. Tamsy summons his vital instrument, the Tokushin, a distaff, and as the Giver, uses it to bind everyone in tight coils. He then spins the mass, crashing it through the floors. The trapped Cleaners land violently below, with Rudo impaled and Delmon unconscious, but Remlin's protective spell heals their nearly fatal wounds. At headquarters, Semiu tells Corvus that Rudo has a Curse inside him. After recovering their masks, a enraged Rudo brutally beats Amo, forgetting their mission until Enjin intervenes. As Tomme treats Amo's injuries, Amo reveals she saw the angel that travels between the Sphere and the Ground.
13	"An Empty Gaze"; Transliteration: "Uro no Hitomi" (Japanese: 虚の瞳)	Ikurō Satō	Atsushi Takahashi	October 5, 2025	TBA
In her recounting to the Cleaners, Amo becomes lost in memories of her past. She recalls her mother selling her to a paranoid trafficker known as Mister, who imprisons her in the Tower. There, he subjects her to extreme abuse while also providing books, food, and dresses. One day, after a "ritual", two masked figures emerge, strike Mister, and remove his boots. The taller figure offers them to Amo. The figures then approach a large hole in the wall, reveal glowing wings, and fly away. When a recovering Mister demands the boots back, Amo resists. The boots activate during their struggle, and she pushes him through the hole to his death. Months pass, and in the present, Amo draws the angel on the floor. Rudo recognizes the mask as belonging to Regto's killer. Amo interrupts his rage, asking if his gloves also filled a void, stating no apology is needed in a world where hands are used only for violence. A calm Rudo suggests they could instead use their hands for connection. After Amo returns to her tower, a shadow falls upon her; Jabber soon exits, his mission accomplished.
14	"The Storm Before the Storm"; Transliteration: "Arashi no Mae no Arashi" (Japanese: 嵐の前の嵐)	Hitoyuki Matsui	Shinji Ishihira	October 12, 2025	TBA
Returning to headquarters, the Cleaners visit Dr. Alice Stilza, a former body pollution researcher, where Rudo encounters her grandchildren, the mask maker August and healer Eishia. After August warns of an approaching Cloud, the team shelters from a trash storm. They are contacted by Semiu, who reports an infestation at HQ and advises a rear entrance. There, Semiu and an invincible shut-in repel Marauders demanding Rudo. The team later celebrates at the Dan Dulse bar, where they meet the Givers of Team Child: Dear Santa, Guita Hebby Fantasia, and Bro Santa. When Guita questions Rudo about the Sphere, he moves away and is confronted by a hooded man. The man reveals Amo's boots, grabs Rudo, and declares himself the Raiders' leader. As the Givers attack, Chtoni opens a portal, transporting the Cleaners and Raiders to a dark chamber where their adversaries emerge from the shadows.
15	"Clash!"; Transliteration: "Naa Maji" (Japanese: なぁマジ)	Satoshi Toba	Jong Heo	October 19, 2025	TBA
In a dark chamber, the Cleaners confront the Raiders, with Rudo demanding to know Amo's location. Receiving no answer, a trashslide erupts from a tunnel, sweeping away all the Cleaners except Rudo. The other Raiders pursue the scattered Cleaners through portals, isolating Rudo with their leader, Zodyl Typhon. He approaches, stating he shares Rudo's rage and proposes they destroy the Sphere together; they experience a shared vision of its fiery descent to the Ground. When Rudo reiterates his question about Amo, Zodyl admonishes him for wasting time. Concurrently, the other Cleaners engage their Raider opponents: Jabber and Zanka resume their previous conflict, with Jabber's claws revealing their true, enlarged form as he commits fully to the fight. Riyo faces Noerde Hew Amozo, whose comb, a vital instrument, transforms her hair into sharp, electrically-charged angles that shock Riyo and leave her prone. Enjin attempts conversation with his young opponent while leaning on his umbrella, and Bro Santa and Dear Santa assess their underground surroundings as their Raider opponent confirms their subterranean location. Separately, Guita Hebby Fantasia emerges into another chamber, bouncing energetically.
16	"Gifted and Not"; Transliteration: "Ten to Bon" (Japanese: 天と凡)	Daisuke Tsukushi	Kenta Yokoya	October 26, 2025	TBA
Observing through her portals, Cthoni records the conflict between the Raiders and Cleaners. Bro Santa and Dear Santa confront a man named Bundus, demanding information on their leader, Arkha Corvus. Simultaneously, Jabber and Zanka continue their duel. Nearby, Zodyl questions why Rudo, from the Sphere, shares the same determined look as those from the Ground. Jabber claims they even smell the same, explaining his fascination, though Rudo remains hostile. Zodyl elaborates on groundlings who worship falling trash as a divine blessing, arguing that such ingrained illusions sometimes require a violent shock to break, a point he illustrates by eating a cockroach. In the fight, Jabber attacks Zanka, who insists he has been fighting seriously all along and is no natural talent. Jabber then slices Zanka's leg with a poisoned claw. As Zanka writhes on the ground, Jabber reveals the claws carried three separate toxins before stabbing him again, extinguishing the light in Zanka's eyes.
17	"Memories of a Mediocrity"; Transliteration: "Bon no Kioku" (Japanese: 凡の記憶)	Hyūga Yamamura	Atsushi Takahashi	November 2, 2025	TBA
After being defeated by Jabber, Zanka experiences a hallucination of his past. He recalls his life within the virtuous Nijiku Clan on the Ground and his enrollment at the Central Hell Guard Academy, where he strives to earn the Golden Throne through diligent effort. His standing is challenged by the arrival of Hyo, a naturally gifted trainee from the slums who bests him in combat. Hyo questions his ambition, asking what value the throne holds if it is based only on others' perception. Later, during a weapon selection, Zanka chooses a plain staff in a misguided attempt to stand out, while Hyo selects a katana. Humiliated, he hides for three days, where Enjin and Riyo express their hope that the average will eclipse the gifted. In the present, Zanka hallucinates rising to his feet, though Jabber notes this is an effect of the paralytic poisons coursing through him. As Jabber prepares to offer him to a trash beast, Guita Hebby Fantasia in another chamber discovers a strange, giant red object studded with weapons held by dismembered, nailed hands.
18	"Oh Zap, Totes Legit"; Transliteration: "Yababiri Barigachi" (Japanese: ヤバビリバリガチ)	Yukihiko Asaki	Takuya Igarashi	November 9, 2025	TBA
During Jabber's celebration, a gunshot wounds the Raider. In a prior confrontation, Riyo and Noerde battle fiercely. Noerde's hair becomes electrified, and though the Raider intervenes, Riyo dodges and uses wind to disorient her, neutralizing the temporary effect. Riyo attempts to attack the hair with her scissors, but the Raider demonstrates control over it. Acknowledging Noerde's strength, Riyo endures her relentless assault and learns she is from the all-women village of Sileia. Riyo then engages the Raider in a destructive hand-to-hand exchange until, pausing for breath, she coughs blood. Riyo asks if anyone heard their calls for help; when Noerde confidently says no, Riyo ends the fight by drawing a handgun and firing twice, wounding the Raider. She reveals Enjin forbade killing, forcing her to use non-lethal means to protect her teammates. The gun is a parting gift, not her primary tool. Noerde suspects Riyo's past as a hitman and is asked for confidentiality. After gathering information, Riyo departs to assist others. In the present, Jabber scolds Riyo, prompting another warning shot. She then checks on a delirious Zanka. Meanwhile, Cthoni teleports to Zodyl, updating him on the other Cleaners before they arrive at a chamber. Rudo demands their intentions, but Zodyl encourages considering his offer, which Rudo disdainfully rejects. Zodyl approaches a luminous object, placing Amo's boots against it; tendrils secure them and they begin to glow. Zodyl identifies them as part of the Watchman series and states his intent to create more.
19	"Watchmen Series"; Transliteration: "Bannin Shirīzu" (Japanese: 番人シリーズ)	Ikurō Satō	Jong Heo	November 16, 2025	TBA
Zodyl, leader of the Raiders, reveals his failed attempt to create a new vital instrument for the Watchman series, identifying Amo's boots, Rudo's gloves, and his own coat as the three known pieces. His experiment instead yielded an artificial trash beast, using the activated object as its core. This triggers Rudo's memory of his adoptive father, Regto, who gave him the gloves and possessed a book with the Watchman symbol, raising the question of how Regto obtained such a unique artifact. Zodyl observes that Rudo has maintained his sanity unlike previous owners, theorizing a shared lack of humanity may be the cause. He has since enhanced the artificial beast by incorporating Amo's boots, and Rudo realizes they are inside it as it prepares to fly toward the Sphere. Concurrently, Bundus informs Dear and Bro of their situation. In response, Bro uses his vital instrument, Cloth, to launch Dear at the chamber wall. Dear's vital instrument, Centralian, activates, and his punches—which grow stronger with each impact—escalate from gentle pats to a devastating blow that shatters the rock.
20	"Ensign"; Transliteration: "Shirushi" (Japanese: 印)	Hiromichi Matano	Shinji Ishihira	November 23, 2025	TBA
As massive cyclone surges rage outside, the artificial trash beast prepares to ascend toward the Sphere. Inside, the amiable Raider Bundus confronts Bro and Dear when the shifting ground gives way, sending the trio plummeting into the beast's interior. They land inside a falling car and escape into a nearby pipe using Bro's Cloth, where they reunite with Enjin and Fu. Bro insists they must escape the construct before it crosses into the Sphere or they will perish. Meanwhile, Dear contacts Semiu at Cleaners HQ via his choker and resolves to act as a beacon to guide their rescue. In another section, the chamber containing Rudo and Zodyl has rotated, leaving Rudo dangling from a stalagmite. Zodyl attempts to recruit him, emphasizing revenge, but Rudo refuses. He states he does not wish to waste anything, including their meeting, which helped him realize he possesses a team that provides him with a home. While he retains his anger, he now has more to live for and releases his grip, falling into the darkness. An enraged Zodyl pursues him, demanding to know where his team is, just as Enjin bursts through the ground. Separately, Cthoni locates the grievously wounded and delirious Jabber.
21	"Time Attack" (Note: Stylized in all caps)	Jun Fujiwara	Jun Fujiwara & Yutaka Nakamura	November 30, 2025	TBA
Upon exiting the vehicle, Bundus prepares his vital instrument and expresses doubt in Enjin. Enjin uses Umbreaker to create a passage to Rudo. Bundus correctly assumes Enjin knows their teammates' positions. Dear, Bro, and Riyo arrive, carrying the unconscious Zanka, while Guita is incapacitated. With Rudo frustrated with Zodyl, Enjin observes Riyo's gun and inquires about a prior incident, causing Riyo to drop Zanka. The trash beast takes flight, altering the chamber. Rudo transforms a nail gun into a vital instrument and fires, but Bundus intervenes with his mechanical arms. Enjin, Riyo, Dear, and Bro attempt to attack, but Bundus repels them, revealing his Hands have been augmented to six arms. Rudo recognizes the potential to channel his power through 3R, concentrating his energy to transform the nail gun. He fires a large nail at Bundus, which is intercepted by the mechanical hands. A second nail impacts the first, shattering Bundus' hands. The shot misses the beast's core, and the nail gun disintegrates as Zodyl prepares to depart. Noerde appears, growling Riyo's name.
22	"The Power of Protection"; Transliteration: "Shugo no Chikara" (Japanese: 守護の力)	Daisuke Tsukushi	Jong Heo & Takuya Igarashi	December 7, 2025	TBA
A major trashstorm intensifies, alarming local residents with its wind-blown debris. Within the conglomerate trash beast, the Cleaners witness Noerde, her body crackling with electrical energy. Zodyl departs with Bundus and Cthoni, while Fu laments the Raiders' abandonment until a commanding voice interrupts, stating it is his turn to decide. The beast hovers near the Ground/Sphere border. Rudo damages the ceiling to blast in air, extinguishing Noerde's flames. Tossed upward, Noerde chooses to fall, remembers Zodyl and her comb, admires the border, and is killed by The Watchman. Inside, the Cleaners struggle as Rudo sees Noerde float past in the darkness. Enjin and Bro observe Guita dragging Zanka. Guita apologizes for her nap, transforms into a kaiju, and seals the breach with her own body. Enjin, Riyo, and Rudo strike the beast's core; Rudo seizes the pendant, causing the structure to crumble. Guita instructs everyone to hold on. Rudo retrieves Amo's boots, and Enjin pulls him onto Guita as they speed toward the Ground. They survive the crash landing. Backup teams locate them, with Delmon expressing worry and Zanka receiving medical treatment. Gris tells Rudo he is relieved, prompting Rudo to call him "big brother" before losing consciousness.
23	"The Man Who Will Be Stronger"; Transliteration: "Tsuyoku Naru Otoko" (Japanese: 強くなる男)	Kōkun	Takuya Igarashi & Fumihiko Suganuma	December 14, 2025	TBA
The Cleaners' backup team surveys the imitation trash beast site as Guita explains Zodyl's plan. Following their return home, Rudo, with Delmon's help, obtains artificial flowers for Zanka but hesitates at the infirmary. Inside, Zanka meditates; Eishia could not fully counteract his poison. Enjin states Zanka will grow stronger from this adversity. Semiu then contacts Enjin, announcing visitors: Remlin and the Canvas Town mayor. They confess a wrongly drawn spell—a prank by Remlin—caused Zanka's condition. Zanka flexes, transforming his arm briefly. Remlin apologizes, but Zanka laughs, blaming no one and asserting a warrior's responsibility to improve. After Rudo stays, Zanka rejects pity, valuing strength over injuries. Later, Enjin and Zanka discuss the Raiders, whose primary goal is not killing Cleaners, but whose trash beast creation forces conflict. Meanwhile, Zodyl informs Bundus their experiment succeeded: they observed the Cleaners surviving a border crossing and now know their location despite their Watchman Series boots. Zodyl presents a reward: a totem carved with "Canis Surebrec", formally inducting Bundus into the Raiders. Zodyl then plans their next actions: Bundus will find the Giver who crafts the communication chokers, while others search for more Watchman Series items before advancing to the Sphere.
24	"Field Trip"; Transliteration: "Ensoku" (Japanese: 遠足)	Hyūga Yamamura & Fumihiko Suganuma	Fumihiko Suganuma	December 22, 2025 (Note: Episode 24 aired at midnight JST, 30 minutes after the original air time.)	TBA
Rudo observes Remlin conflicted. Encouraged by Zanka, Rudo offers indirect support by stating he is terrible at drawing before asking for tips, which moves Remlin to tears and laughter. Later, as their guardians play cards, the children draw together. Semiu and Corvus enter; after seeing Rudo's drawing, Corvus gives a polite compliment while Semiu states Rudo cannot draw. Corvus assigns a field trip to Canvas Town for mural research, designating Rudo as the group's guide. In Hole Town to buy ink, Rudo warns the town of their presence. Enjin and Bro observe them, with Enjin recognizing the former Raider Fu. Meanwhile, the Hell Guard arrives at headquarters. Their commander, Kyouka Nijiku, demands Rudo for study, but Corvus refuses. In Hole Town, a kidnapper's attempt fails when Rudo kicks him. The group proceeds to Canvas Town. In a tunnel, Remlin shows them the spellcasters' mural on the ceiling, which includes a drawing by Macaca Icol. Enjin and Bro observe. They note the Watchman Series mark beside Icol's drawing, which Remlin identifies as the symbol of Icol's friend, Canis Surebrec—a name Rudo reveals as his own surname. Elsewhere, Amo is chained in a dark cell when she sees a figure at the door.

=== Video game ===
In December 2025, a RPG video game by Com2uS Group was announced. Titled Gachiakuta: Breakout, the game is set to be released for PlayStation 5, Xbox Series X and Series S, and Windows (via Steam) in 2027.

=== Stage play ===
A stage play adaptation of the manga was announced in December 2025. It was held at the Stellar Ball in Tokyo from May 22–26 and 29–31, 2026, and at the Rohm Theater in Kyoto from June 5–7. Go Ueki directed the show, and Watashiomu wrote the script. The music was directed by Ken the 390 and written by Yoshizumi and Mush Tanaka. The cast included Hikaru Imamaki as Rudo, who was replaced by Ryota Kamiya after Imamaki injured his leg on May 26, Yuta Tachibana as Enjin, Yū Fukuzawa as Zanka, Sena as Riyo, Dai Isono as Corvus, Saho Aono as Semiu, Masamichi Satōnaka as Tamsy, Shō Arai as Delmon, Takeshi Terayama as Gris, Yui Yoko as Amo, Cocoa Nanase as Remlin, Ryosei Tanaka as Jabber.

== Reception ==
=== Manga ===
The columnist for Real Sound liked the world building, action, and dark fantasy elements of the story, as well as the main protagonist. Masaki Endo from Tsutaya News liked the artwork and the main protagonist of the series. Atsushi Ohkubo recommended the series.

In North America, the volumes of Gachiakuta were ranked on Circana BookScan's monthly top 20 adult graphic novels list since July 2025. The first volume also ranked on The New York Times' Graphic Books and Manga bestseller monthly list from February to July 2026.

In the 2022 Next Manga Award, the series ranked 13th in the print manga category. It was also the most popular choice among English voters, even though the series had not been released in English at the time. The series ranked 14th in the Nationwide Bookstore Employees' Recommended Comics of 2023. It was nominated for the 47th Kodansha Manga Award in the shōnen category in 2023; it was also nominated for the 48th edition in the same category in 2024; it won the award in the 50th edition in 2026.

=== Anime ===
The Encyclopedia of Science Fiction described Gachiakuta as an impressive anime, praising its exciting plot, imaginative worldbuilding, strong characterization and excellent animation. It highlighted the series's exploration of social inequality through its depiction of a privileged society living above a world overwhelmed by discarded objects and marginalized people, while noting that this premise is familiar in science fiction. The encyclopedia also emphasized the psychological complexity of protagonist Rudo, whose experiences of abandonment inform his attachment to discarded objects and his ability to recognize their hidden value. It identified the formation of beliefs and the acceptance of familiar assumptions as common sense as another important theme. Although it criticized the occasionally excessive fight sequences and inconsistent humor, it considered these relatively minor shortcomings.

=== Awards ===
Year	Award	Category	Recipient	Result	Ref.
2026	12th Anime Trending Awards	Anime of the Year	Gachiakuta	Nominated	
2026	12th Anime Trending Awards	Best in Animation	Gachiakuta	Nominated	
2026	12th Anime Trending Awards	Action or Adventure Anime of the Year	Gachiakuta	Nominated	
2026	12th Anime Trending Awards	Fantasy Anime of the Year	Gachiakuta	Nominated	
2026	10th Crunchyroll Anime Awards	Anime of the Year	Gachiakuta	Nominated	
2026	10th Crunchyroll Anime Awards	Best New Series	Gachiakuta	Won	
2026	10th Crunchyroll Anime Awards	Best Action	Gachiakuta	Nominated	
2026	10th Crunchyroll Anime Awards	Best Animation	Gachiakuta	Nominated	
2026	10th Crunchyroll Anime Awards	Best Background Art	Gachiakuta	Won	
2026	10th Crunchyroll Anime Awards	Best Character Design	Satoshi Ishino	Won	
2026	10th Crunchyroll Anime Awards	Best Director	Fumihiko Suganuma	Nominated	
2026	10th Crunchyroll Anime Awards	Best Main Character	Rudo Surebrec	Nominated	
2026	10th Crunchyroll Anime Awards	Best Supporting Character	Enjin	Nominated	
2026	10th Crunchyroll Anime Awards	Best Score	Taku Iwasaki	Nominated	
2026	10th Crunchyroll Anime Awards	Best Opening Sequence	"HUGs" by Paledusk	Nominated	
2026	10th Crunchyroll Anime Awards	Best Voice Artist Performance (Portuguese)	Erick Bougleux as Zanka Nijiku	Nominated	
2026	10th Crunchyroll Anime Awards	Best Voice Artist Performance (Castilian)	Adrián Pineda as Rudo Surebrec	Nominated	
2026	10th Crunchyroll Anime Awards	Best Voice Artist Performance (French)	Bruno Mullenaerts as Enjin	Nominated	
2026	10th Crunchyroll Anime Awards	Best Voice Artist Performance (German)	Markus Feustel as Rudo Surebrec	Nominated	
2026	10th Crunchyroll Anime Awards	Best Voice Artist Performance (Spanish)	Dion González as Rudo Surebrec	Nominated	
2026	Music Awards Japan	Top Japanese Song in North America	"Outlaws Get No Entry" by Taku Iwasaki	Nominated	
2026	Japan Expo Awards	Daruma for Best Anime	Gachiakuta	Won	
2026	Japan Expo Awards	Daruma for Best Action Anime	Gachiakuta	Won	
2026	Japan Expo Awards	Daruma for Best Original Soundtrack	Gachiakuta	Nominated	
2026	Japan Expo Awards	Daruma for Best Ending	"Ban" by Karanoah	Nominated	
2026	21st AnimaniA Awards	Best TV Series: Online	Gachiakuta	Won	
