= My Hero Academia season 2 =

Second season of My Hero Academia

My Hero Academia
- Season 2
- Cover art of the first Blu-ray volume of the second season released by Toho on July 19, 2017
- No. of episodes: 25

Release
- Original network: ytv, NTV
- Original release: April 1 – September 30, 2017

Season chronology
- ← Previous; Season 1 Next → Season 3

The second season of the My Hero Academia anime television series was produced by Bones and directed by Kenji Nagasaki, with Yōsuke Kuroda handling series composition, Yoshihiko Umakoshi providing character designs and Yuki Hayashi composed the music. Like the first season, it adapts Kōhei Horikoshi's original My Hero Academia manga series from the rest of the 3rd volume through the end of the 8th volume. It covers the "U.A. Sports Festival" (chapters 22–44), "Vs. Hero Killer" (chapters 45–59), and "Final Exams" arcs (chapters 60–69), with the exception of episode 13.5 (recap) and chapter 70 (which is the separate storyline from the season arcs). The season aired from April 1 to September 30, 2017, on ytv and NTV in Japan.

The season follows Izuku Midoriya, who has been given a chance to show off his Quirk along with his classmates in the Sports Festival, in which the Pro Heroes can hire the students as their interns. Later, things are getting worse in Hosu City as Stain appears, eventually leading to a confrontation with the League of Villains and the young Hero interns. Near the end of the first semester, the Class 1-A students face off against their teachers in combat during the final exams. While facing their adversity, Izuku and Bakugo must put their differences aside in facing against their idol.

Toho released the season on DVD and Blu-ray in eight compilations, each containing two to four episodes, between July 19, 2017, and February 14, 2018. Funimation licensed the season for an English-language release in North America and released it in two compilations on April 3 and June 5, 2018. Like the previous season, FunimationNow, Crunchyroll and Hulu are streaming the season outside of Asia as it airs. Animax Asia is simulcasting the season in the same day it airs. Funimation's adaptation ran from August 11, 2018, to February 24, 2019, on Adult Swim's Toonami block.

The second season makes use of four pieces of theme music: two opening themes and two ending themes. The first opening theme, used for the first thirteen episodes, is "Peace Sign" (ピースサイン) performed by Kenshi Yonezu and the first ending theme is "Dakara, Hitori ja nai" (だから、ひとりじゃない, Therefore, I am not Alone), performed by Little Glee Monster. For the rest of the season, the second opening theme is "Sora ni Utaeba" (空に歌えば, Singin' to the Sky) performed by amazarashi and the ending theme is "Datte Atashi no Hero" (だってアタシのヒーロー, Still My Hero) by LiSA.

== Episodes ==
No. overall	No. in season	Title	Directed by (Note: Information is taken from the ending credits of each episode.)	Storyboarded by	Original release date	English air date	Viewership rating
14	1	"That's the Idea, Ochaco"; Transliteration: "Sou iu Koto ne Ochako-san" (Japanese: そういうことね お茶子さん)	Tetsuya Miyanishi (Note: Credited under the pen name "Setsumu Dōkawa" (堂川 セツム, Dōkawa Setsumu).)	Kenji Nagasaki	April 1, 2017	August 11, 2018	3.4%
Still recovering from the previous incident, the students prepare for their upcoming School Festival event. At lunchtime, the students of Class 1-A decide to forget about the attack and pump themselves up for the Sports Festival. The most excited out of all of them appears to be Ochaco Uraraka, who puts on her game face and yells to everyone that she plans to do her best. Afterwards, she walks with Izuku Midoriya and Tenya Ida, who are wondering why Ochaco wants to become a hero and Izuku admits that she has a more practical reason about it. The school is about to hold the Sports Festival, which will serve as an opportunity for the students to show off their Quirks to professional heroes looking for sidekicks. In the occasion, All Might confesses to Izuku that his powers are diminishing, and that the festival is an opportunity for Izuku to show his true value to the world.
15	2	"Roaring Sports Festival"; Transliteration: "Unare Taiikusai" (Japanese: うなれ体育祭)	Tomo Ōkubo	Kō Matsuo	April 8, 2017	August 18, 2018	3.5%
Shoto Todoroki expresses to Izuku that he will defeat him and show his true power. Class 1-A walks out to the Freshmen Stage of the Festival Stadium and the U.A. Sports Festival begins. The other freshmen classes also arrive. Midnight who is the chief referee for this event, asks the student representative Katsuki Bakugo to lead the pledge. Instead, Bakugo takes the stage and announces to everyone that he will win the Festival, garnering boos from all the students. Afterwards, Midnight announces the preliminaries of the Festival will be an obstacle-course race around the stadium. The students from the four branches of the school - Hero, General Studies, Business and Support Courses - participate in an obstacle-course race. The participants struggle to exit through the stadium door. Todoroki realizes an obstacle and makes his move by freezing the pathway and racing ahead of all the others. Even though many students are frozen in place, Bakugo, Momo Yaoyorozu, Yuga Aoyama, and Eijiro Kirishima avoid the ice and remain close behind Todoroki. Other villain bots confront Izuku, and instead of quaking in fear like at the entrance exam, he decides to commit himself devising a strategy.
16	3	"In Their Own Quirky Ways"; Transliteration: "Minna Koseiteki de ii ne" (Japanese: みんな個性的でいいね)	Hitomi Ezoe	Shinji Ishihira	April 15, 2017	August 25, 2018	3.9%
During the obstacle race, Todoroki effortlessly passes each obstacle with Bakugo in hot pursuit. At the last obstacle, Izuku uses his wits to pass through both and win the race. Although Izuku does not show off his Quirk in the first event, All Might comments on how he had nothing to worry about because Izuku shows that he is a fighter whose selflessness does not hold him back. Midnight announces the standings from the first event and also announces the second event in Sports Festival, the Cavalry Battle. Midnight explains that the event consists of forming teams from two to four people in order to earn points by stealing headbands from other teams. A team's point value is based on the value of its individual members. The members of the team receive point value based on their placement in the obstacle race. Izuku who comes in first place, is worth of ten million points; however his victory is short-lived when he realizes that by being first place and the other students desperately figure out to take him down, he is becoming the massive target for the next round.
17	4	"Strategy, Strategy, Strategy"; Transliteration: "Saku Saku Saku" (Japanese: 策策策)	Takudai Kakuchi	Kō Matsuo	April 22, 2017	September 8, 2018 (Note: Episode 17 was delayed due to Adult Swim airing a marathon of the first season of My Hero Academia on September 1, 2018.)	N/A
In the preparation of the next round, the Cavalry Battle, Izuku notices that all the participants are joining fellow peers from their homeroom class, but also they are avoiding him because he is worth so many points. He begins to panic, until Uraraka decides to join him and says it is good for friends to team up. They try to recruit Ida for their team as well, but he refuses and joins Todoroki's team instead. As the time runs out for participants to forming teams, Izuku teams up with Ochaco, Fumikage Tokoyami and Support Course student Mei Hatsume. Being the team with most points, they barely evade the advances from the other teams from their class, while the students from Class 1-B take advantage of it to claim points for themselves, especially Team Monoma whom managed to steal Bakugo's headband. Izuku takes notice of Class 1-B's long-term strategy and believes that none of them will come after his team. He prepares to instruct his team to relax, but Team Todoroki confronts them. Todoroki declares that he will take the ten million point headband.
18	5	"Cavalry Battle Finale"; Transliteration: "Kibasen Kecchaku" (Japanese: 騎馬戦決着)	Tetsuya Miyanishi	Ken Ōtsuka	April 29, 2017	September 15, 2018	N/A
As the end of the Cavalry Battle approaches, Izuku's team has a heated confrontation with the team led by Todoroki. Todoroki was able to steal Izuku's ten million points headband and as a result, meaning he cannot move but he takes a moment to remind Izuku he would try his best to defeat his friend. Tokoyami suggests the team try for other headbands, but Izuku refuses and Ochaco encourages them to try and get their points back. Izuku tries to grab the ten million points back from Todoroki, however he mistakenly grabs another headband which only worths seventy points. Without enough points to move onto the next round, Team Midoriya makes one final attempt. Bakugo also arrives on the scene, but time runs out just as everyone is about to clash. Despite losing first place to them, they advance to the next round after Tokoyami revealed that Izuku's attack allowed the Dark Shadow to grab one of Todoroki's headbands. Izuku cries tears of joy while Todoroki berates himself for using his left side. Other teams are blaming for their loss, especially Team Tetsutetsu on karmic punishment for underhandedly stealing Mineta's headband.
19	6	"The Boy Born with Everything"; Transliteration: "Subete o Motte Umareta Otokonoko" (Japanese: 全てを持って生まれた男の子)	Yōhei Fukui	Seiji Mizushima	May 6, 2017	September 22, 2018	3.5%
The 16 remaining students advance to the final stage, with one-on-one battles to decide the winner. Before the fights begin, Todoroki has a private talk with Izuku, revealing the reasons for his hatred toward his father, the world's second-best hero Endeavor, unaware that Bakugo is also listening. Todoroki explains he was born through Quirk Marriage, an unethical practice where two people marry solely to conceive a child with a powerful Quirk that combines the parents' Quirks and that Endeavor sought his wife Rei's hand in marriage solely to sire a child who could surpass All Might, as well as how Endeavor's abusive behavior eventually led to Rei having a mental breakdown where she burned the left side of Shoto's face with boiling water. Meanwhile, the two top Pro Heroes meet on a set of stairs. Endeavor tries to ignore All Might, but All Might pursues him. He compliments Endeavor for his son's performance and asks for tips on how to train the heroes of the future. However, Endeavor refuses and only replies that Shoto will replace All Might as the top hero one day. The fighting tournament bracket was announced, and Izuku's first round opponent was General Department student Hitoshi Shinso, but just as he is about to attack, Izuku suddenly becomes immobile.
20	7	"Victory or Defeat"; Transliteration: "Kachimake" (Japanese: 勝ち負け)	Tomo Ōkubo	Tomo Ōkubo	May 13, 2017	September 29, 2018	3.4%
In the first round, Izuku is struck by Hitoshi Shinso's brainwashing ability, but breaks free in the last moment due to a vision of One For All's previous holders and obtains victory by countering with a shoulder throw and sends him out of bounds. Having been defeated, Shinso remembers his past. At Nabooh City Junior High, many of Shinso's classmates comment on how his Quirk is very villainous. Shinso gets used to being looked at as the bad guy but has always stayed headstrong in his desire to be a hero. Before he walks towards the exit, Izuku asks him what drives to be a hero. Shinso's classmates manage to cheer him up by making him see how the Pro Heroes were impressed by his Quirk's ability. After Shoto's talk with his father Endeavor, Todoroki displays his overwhelming power and easily wins his match against Hanta Sero, becoming Izuku's opponent in the following round. Everyone watches in disbelief of Todoroki's power, and Izuku notices that he looks immensely sad.
21	8	"Battle on, Challengers!"; Transliteration: "Furue! Charenjā" (Japanese: 奮え！チャレンジャー)	Satoshi Takafuji	Kō Matsuo	May 20, 2017	October 6, 2018	3.0%
The U.A. Sports Festival continues with the completion of the other six bracket matches. Shiozaki swiftly overcomes Kaminari. Mei manipulates Ida in order to show off her tech to support companies, giving him the win by stepping out. Mina beats Aoyama by exploiting his weakness. Momo is overwhelmed by the speed of Tokoyami's Dark Shadow and is pushed out of the ring. Tetsutetsu and Kirishima have a homestyle brawl ending in a tie. Meanwhile, Ochaco and company discuss her upcoming match against Bakugo. Izuku offers her a strategy to beat him, but Ochaco refuses and declares that she will do her best to defeat Bakugo on her own. Throughout all of this, Ochaco is trying to prepare herself for the daunting task of battling Bakugo.
22	9	"Bakugo vs. Uraraka"; Transliteration: "Bakugō bāsasu Uraraka" (Japanese: 爆豪vs麗日)	Hitomi Ezoe	Shinji Ishihira	May 27, 2017	October 13, 2018	N/A
Ochaco uses many different strategies in attempt to defeat Bakugo. However despite her plans, Ochaco falls unconscious which allows Bakugo to win the match. Izuku goes to the waiting rooms to prepare. He is surprised when he finds Ochaco there and not Recovery Girl's office. Taken back by Ochaco's lively attitude, Izuku asks if she is okay, to which she replies she is fine. Also during this time, Tetsutetsu and Kirishima have an arm-wrestling contest to determine who moves on to the next round; Kirishima wins and the two become friends. Meanwhile, Izuku leaves Ochaco after she wishes him good luck. Afterwards, Ochaco talks over the phone with her father who tries to console her, but to no avail. Izuku felt emotional himself while reflecting on Ochaco's encouragement to him, then he is approached by Endeavor who tries to tell him about his power was similar to All Might but Izuku walks away. Izuku prepares for his fight with Todoroki. Elsewhere, Tomura Shigaraki is advised to pay close attention to the match because the two boys may become formidable obstacles to him one day and replies that he is not worried about them.
23	10	"Shoto Todoroki: Origin"; Transliteration: "Todoroki Shōto: Orijin" (Japanese: 轟 焦凍:オリジン)	Tetsuya Miyanishi	Shinji Satō	June 3, 2017	October 20, 2018	3.0%
Izuku and Todoroki begin their match. Izuku, while still trying to win, is attempting to convince Todoroki to use his left side so they can both battle at their full power. As Todoroki fights on, more of his past is revealed through flashbacks. He remembers his mother Rei saying it was okay to use his left side because he wanted to be a hero. So Izuku fights Todoroki who is using both sides. Cementoss and Midnight attempt to stop the match before the two deal their final attacks but to no avail. Everyone watches in pure disbelief, and after he recovers, Cementoss commends both of them for their talent. Present Mic asks what caused the explosion, to which Aizawa replies that it was caused by the rapid change in temperature of the arena. The smoke clears, and Izuku is thrown out of bounds resulted to a victory for Todoroki and moves into the next round.
24	11	"Fight on, Ida"; Transliteration: "Īda-kun Faito" (Japanese: 飯田くんファイト)	Tōru Yoshida	Ken Ōtsuka	June 10, 2017	October 27, 2018	N/A
In the aftermath of Izuku and Shoto's showdown, Bakugo finds himself annoyed as he overhears fans discussing the battle. Shoto exits the arena and encounters his father in the corridor about the former's fire powers. Endeavor tries to offer him the chance to become his sidekick after graduation, but Shoto ignores it and reveals he has not rescinded his disavowal of his father. Todoroki admits to his father that he was able to use his left side fire because he forgot all about him. Izuku caused significant damage in his right hand warranting surgery; school nurse Recovery Girl refuses future treatment if he does it again. All Might admits to his youth being identical to Izuku's as he was also born Quirkless. In the last matches of the second round, Ida and Tokoyami push respective opponents Shiozaki and Mina out of bounds, while Bakugo overpowers Kirishima. When Ida fights Todoroki, Ida is frozen and rendered unable to go on. Bakugo figures out Tokoyami's weakness to intense light as they fight and makes him yield. Meanwhile in Tokyo, Tenya's brother Ingenium is seriously injured in pursuit of the Hero Killer: Stain, and Ida is informed not long after by his mother. Stain is invited by Kurogiri to meet with Shigaraki about joining the League of Villains.
25	12	"Todoroki vs. Bakugo"; Transliteration: "Todoroki bāsasu Bakugō" (Japanese: 轟vs爆豪)	Satoshi Takafuji	Ken Ōtsuka	June 17, 2017	November 3, 2018	N/A
Todoroki is still unsure if he should be using his left side. As the match starts, Todoroki attacks Bakugo with his ice power. Bakugo becomes angry as he wants Todoroki to fight him with both of his sides. After Izuku's cheer, Todoroki decides to use his left side but when Bakugo is about to use his "Howitzer Impact", Todoroki suddenly stops using his left side. The attack pushes Todoroki out of bounds, resulting in Bakugo being named the winner. Angered, Bakugo still goes after Todoroki, but Midnight stops him. After the match, All Might gives everyone medals. But Bakugo reminds him that his champion refuses the gold medal because he feels this has not proved that he is the best. All Might forces him to take it by putting it in his mouth, and then moves on to close out the ceremony. Ida already left to see his brother at the hospital and did not attend the award ceremony. After everyone went home to recover, Todoroki finally decides to go see Rei, whom he had not seen for many years. Ochaco finishes grocery shopping and returns home to her parents surprising her with a celebration for her efforts. Izuku's mom tells him that she had fainted seven times during the Cavalry Battle at breakfast. Still fuming over the festival, Bakugo threatens his mouth germs while brushing his teeth, making his mother scold him for yelling early in the day.
26	13	"Time to Pick Some Names"; Transliteration: "Namae o Tsuke te Miyō no Kai" (Japanese: 名前をつけてみようの会)	Takudai Kakuchi	Satomi Nakamura	June 24, 2017	November 10, 2018	N/A
The Sports Festival is over, and everyone's injuries are almost recovered. Mr. Aizawa announces that everyone has to decide a hero name for themselves especially for Izuku who reveals that his hero name was chosen the moniker of "Deku" which makes Ochaco inspires him and Izuku had a change of heart, and that since many of the students have gotten multiple offers from pro heroes, everyone will be doing a one-week internship at a hero agency. Midnight joins in to offer feedback on everyone's hero name requests. Ida however, who is emotionally struggling with his older brother becoming paralyzed, is unable to bring himself to follow his brother's wishes for him to take on the hero name "Ingenium". After that, everyone chooses an agency for their internship. Izuku is still not sure which agency he should join when suddenly All Might shows up. He tells Izuku that his teacher has offered an internship, and Izuku accepts it before he leaves with Ochaco. Meanwhile, Ida picks an agency in the area where his brother was attacked. The next day, everyone sets off for the internships. Ida affirms their friendship with Izuku and Ochaco and walks away, changing his expression from a smile to a vengeful glare. Afterwards, Izuku travels to Gran Torino's house and frightened to find him inside playing dead.
27	14	"Bizarre! Gran Torino Appears"; Transliteration: "Kaiki! Guran Torino Arawaru" (Japanese: 怪奇!グラントリノ現る)	Yūji Ōya	Kō Matsuo	July 8, 2017	November 24, 2018 (Note: Episode 27 was delayed due to Adult Swim airing an Attack on Titan marathon on November 17, 2018.)	N/A
The internship program starts and Izuku is waiting to meet Gran Torino but when he does he is not what he expected. Izuku begins to leave until Gran Torino shows his power and tempts Izuku to fight him. Meanwhile, Ida is looking for hero-killer Stain and the other students of Class A are also busy in their internship. Izuku trains hard with Gran Torino and finally starts to understand One For All. Gran Torino instructs Izuku to heat up the food he bought, but Izuku messes it up by not allowing the food to rotate in the microwave while they cook. After Gran Torino berates him for fouling up the frozen pastries, Izuku makes the connection between the food and himself. He realizes that like the pastries, he needs to let the energy flow equally through all parts of himself evenly. Gran Torino watches closely as Izuku spreads One For All's power throughout his body continuously, impressed with how quickly he caught on to his symbolic lesson. Then he challenges Izuku again using his newly mastered ability, One For All: Full Cowl.
28	15	"Midoriya and Shigaraki"; Transliteration: "Midoriya to Shigaraki" (Japanese: 緑谷と死柄木)	Tomo Ōkubo	Tomo Ōkubo	July 15, 2017	December 1, 2018	3.0%
As soon as their mock battle begins Gran Torino stops the flow of One For All's power by striking Izuku from several angles. Unable to counter due to Gran Torino's speed, Izuku hides underneath a table to buy enough time to activate One For All: Full Cowl. As he continues to take time about his battle with Gran Torino using his new power, Izuku leaps into the air and nearly hits the old man, but Gran Torino is able to counter and get behind Izuku. Izuku tries to use a smash on him but Gran Torino proves to be too fast and just narrowly dodges the smash before headbutting Izuku into a wall. After three minutes are up, Gran Torino thinks that Izuku has improved and is a worthy one after he grazed his cheek. Now that Izuku knows how to control some of his powers he starts to train more and more with Gran Torino to perfect that power. Meanwhile Tsukauchi informs All Might about the captured Nomu. It was once a low-level thug whose DNA and body were altered to the point it lose its brain activity and that someone gave it multiple Quirks, leading All Might to suspect that a specific individual has returned. After Stain refuses to join the League of Villains, he returns to Hosu City to hunt down more heroes. Shigaraki also goes to Hosu, releasing several Nomus into the city. On the way to respond to the Nomu attacks, Ida discovers Stain just as he is about to kill another hero. Meanwhile, Gran Torino decides to take Izuku to Shibuya City, and their train is attacked by a Nomu as they pass Hosu.
29	16	"Hero Killer: Stain vs U.A. Students"; Transliteration: "Hīrō Goroshi Sutein bāsasu U.A. Seito" (Japanese: ヒーロー殺し ステインvs雄英生徒)	Hitomi Ezoe, Sayaka Ikeda	Michio Fukuda	July 22, 2017	December 8, 2018	2.8%
Hosu City is under attack by Stain and by three Nomus released by the League of Villains. As Gran Torino battles the Nomu that attacked their train, Izuku searches the city for Ida. Ida confronts Stain but is overpowered as Stain berates him for prioritizing his vengeance over saving the wounded hero. Izuku arrives just in time to prevent Stain from killing Ida. Having received a cryptic message from Izuku before he attacked Stain, Todoroki arrives just as Stain has used his Quirk, "Bloodcurdle", to paralyze Izuku. He scolds Izuku for not explaining the urgency of the situation because he could have gotten there sooner. As Izuku figures out the secret of Stain's Quirk, Todoroki struggles to evade Stain's many blades and Ida struggles with his own rage and quest for vengeance. After Todoroki tries to save Ida like Izuku had done for him, Ida reflects shamefully on himself and starts to move his hand.
30	17	"Climax"; Transliteration: "Ketchaku" (Japanese: 決着)	Satoshi Takafuji	Ken Ōtsuka	July 29, 2017	December 15, 2018	4.5%
Ida fights off Stain's Quirk and joins the battle with Todoroki and Izuku. Endeavor and Gran Torino defeat a Nomu while the three U.A. students defeat Stain - at the cost of serious injuries to Ida and Izuku. Endeavor defeats the remaining Nomu and manages to calm the crisis. Todoroki restrains the defeated Hero Killer using rope and Native carries an injured Izuku out to the street. Gran Torino meets them there and berates Izuku for leaving the train against his orders. The other Pros arrive to call an ambulance for the injured and the police to arrest the Hero Killer. As Ida apologizes his friends for getting them mixed up in the fight, an escaped Nomu captures Izuku and begins to fly away with him. Stain recovers and uses his Quirk to stop it. He saves Izuku by grabbing him and stabbing the Nomu's brain. In spite of being heavily injured, Stain states that the "fake" pro heroes and the pathetic criminals in society must be purged to create a more just society, unnerving everyone, including Endeavor. However, before he can launch his attack, Stain's perforated lungs cause him to lose consciousness.
31	18	"The Aftermath of Hero Killer: Stain"; Transliteration: "'Hīrō Goroshi Sutein' Sono Yoha" (Japanese: 「ヒーロー殺しステイン」その余波)	Takudai Kakuchi	Seiji Mizushima	August 5, 2017	January 6, 2019 (Note: Episode 31 was delayed due to Adult Swim airing a Dragon Ball Super marathon on December 22, 2018, and a Boruto: Naruto Next Generations marathon on December 29, 2018, respectively. When normal programming resumed, Adult Swim moved My Hero Academia to 12:00 a.m. EST/PST on the night of January 5, 2019, which is January 6.)	N/A
Following Stain's arrest, the video of Stain expressing his views on the present Heroes has gone viral, and more people are falling to those views. With Stain in custody, they begin to gravitate towards the League of Villains. Meanwhile, credit for the arrest has gone to Endeavor, to ensure that Ida, Izuku and Todoroki are not arrested for using their powers without permission. Ida apologizes for his rash behavior and decides to work on improving himself. Kirishima confirms that the location Izuku sent out earlier was an SOS, but he and Tetsutetsu are caught and punished by Fourth Kind for being late to the internship. Momo and Kendo are finally able to go out on patrol with pro hero Uwabami after filming a commercial with her and Ochaco calls Izuku about the incident. Gran Torino calls All Might and berates him because Izuku got his teaching license revoked and his pay docked. All Might apologizes and blames it on his own inadequate teaching. He replies that heroes will rise to defeat them, but Gran Torino responds that the League of Villains will rally them under Stain's ideology since there has been a connection between them. He advises All Might to reveal everything about himself and One For All to Izuku when the opportunity arises and ends the call. Meanwhile, two men discuss about Stain's backstory and ideology in a hostess bar after one of them claims he may retire because of the drop in crime due to All Might's presence. Born Chizome Akaguro, Stain, inspired by All Might, wanted to become a hero, but become became dismayed by how many only wanted to be heroes for fame and fortune. After failing advocate the return of true heroism, he eventually resorted to his violent killing spree. The man who smokes the cigarette, stating that Stain's words will inspire many criminals into uniting with the organization Stain was believed to be allied with.
32	19	"Everyone's Internships"; Transliteration: "Sorezore no Shokuba Taiken" (Japanese: それぞれの職場体験)	Ikurō Satō	Shinji Satō	August 12, 2017	January 13, 2019	2.7%
Anime-original episode showing what some of the other characters did during their internships, particularly Tsuyu/Froppy. In the fishing boat, Selkie and a couple of his crewmates are trapped inside after being fooled. Using her Quirk, Sirius hears Selkie and told her that this boat was a decoy and they must pursue the real stowaways. The criminal ringleader Innsmouth begins to attack them. He wraps his tentacles around Sirius and threatens to crush her if Tsuyu does not tell her superiors to call off the search and she gives away their location. Innsmouth pins Tsuyu down and is about to finish her off, until Selkie saves her and successfully defeats the villain by using his Spotted Seal Quirk. Tsuyu called Sirius and tells that she discovered on what is important about becoming a hero. The criminals are all arrested and the coast guard thanks Tsuyu for her involvement.
33	20	"Listen Up!! A Tale from the Past"; Transliteration: "Shire!! Mukashi no Hanashi" (Japanese: 知れ!!昔の話)	Takayuki Yamamoto	Kō Matsuo	August 19, 2017	January 20, 2019	4.1%
Izuku and Gran Torino bid farewell after a week of training. He thanks his mentor for helping him gain more control over his Quirk. As Izuku walks away, Gran Torino returns to his senile state and asks Izuku his name. At first Izuku is disconcerted by it, but he soon realizes what Gran Torino is truly asking for and replies "Deku". Pleased with Izuku's response, Gran Torino waves him off and they go their separate ways. Following the conclusion of their internships, everyone has returned to school and talk to each other about their experience. Ojiro admits he fears what may have happened if Stain had come to the U.S.J. and Kaminari replies that the Hero Killer is kind of cool because of his personality. Izuku scolds Kaminari for this, prompting the latter to apologize. Ida admits Stain could be looked at as "kind of cool" but goes on to criticize the villain for killing for his own ends. At Class 1-A's Hero Basic Training Class, All Might announces their lesson will consist of a rescue training race through Field Gamma. After the class, All Might decides to tell Izuku the truth behind his Quirk, One For All. When Quirks first and the world was in disarray a villain named All For One, used his eponymous Quirk to steal and grant Quirks to gain control over Japan. All For One also had a seemingly Quirkless younger brother who had a strong sense of justice. When All For One gave his brother a stockpile power Quirk, it was discover that the brother actually had the power to transfers Quirks to others and it fused to the stockpile Quirk to form One For All. One For All was passed down through the generations until All Might defeated All For One but left him with his injuries. All Might suspects All For One is still alive and is the true mastermind of the League of Villains, and tell Izuku that he'll train him for the eventual encounter, though All Might isn't able to reveal that he probably won't be by Izuku's side when the time comes. Meanwhile, a man who is surprised about the capture of Hero Killer: Stain, exclaims that Shigaraki's position is to supervise and unify the new villains who came to join the League of Villains.
34	21	"Gear up for Final Exams"; Transliteration: "Sonaero Kimatsu Tesuto" (Japanese: 備えろ期末テスト)	Tomo Ōkubo	Shinji Ishihira	September 2, 2017	January 27, 2019	3.2%
Final exams are approaching, and the class prepares for their written and practical exams. Momo hosts a study party at her mansion, and Kendo tells Izuku and his friends that the practical exam will be against robot enemies. After making it through three days of written exams, everyone is shocked to learn that the practical exam will not involve robots this year - instead, they will be fighting in predetermined pairs against one of their teachers. To pass, they must either defeat the teacher or escape the arena before time runs out. The first team, Kirishima and Sato, attempt to take on Cementoss head-on with their endurance and strength respectively. But Izuku notices that the strategy will not earn them a victory because unlike the students, Cementoss does not have a time limit to his Quirk. As a result, Kirishima and Sato both failed the practical exam and are ultimately defeated. The next pair to take the practical exam consists of Tokoyami and Tsuyu. Immediately their opponent, Ectoplasm, creates clones of himself that surround the students. He states that all of the U.A. teachers will not hold back and are doing their best to crush the students.
35	22	"Yaoyorozu: Rising"; Transliteration: "Yaoyorozu: Raijingu" (Japanese: 八百万：ライジング)	Takudai Kakuchi	Michio Fukuda	September 9, 2017	February 3, 2019	3.0%
As the practical in the final exams continues, Tsuyu and Tokoyami work together to evade Ectoplasm's army of clones. Both struggles to battle against him, due to his Giant Bite Detention technique that creates a giant clone of himself which attacks and immobilizes the students. But Tsuyu believes that they can win, because Tokoyami is strong. Ectoplasm was able to take down Dark Shadow, but his legs ends up cuffed in the exchange. Ectoplasm praises the duo for their cleverness, and they pass the practical exam. In the third match, Ida and Ojiro face off against the burrowing Power Loader. They passed the exam after Ojiro repels the teacher and crosses through the escape gate, which makes Power Loader impressed and congratulates them on passing. In the fourth match, Todoroki and Momo whose confidence was shattered after being easily defeated by Tokoyami in the Sports Festival, attempt to evade Aizawa's Quirk. Todoroki claims he can escape the restraints instantly, but Aizawa hands him from a light pole and throws caltrops beneath him. As Momo makes haste for the escape gate, she nervously ponders whether she is making the right choices or not. But Todoroki backs up in confidence on her and reveals why he voted her as a class president, then they come up with the better plan in able to defeat Eraser Head and Todoroki thanks Momo for helping him pass the practical exam much to Momo's tears.
36	23	"Stripping the Varnish"; Transliteration: "Mukero Hitokawa" (Japanese: むけろ一皮)	Satoshi Takafuji	Ken Ōtsuka	September 16, 2017	February 10, 2019	3.9%
In the next match, Ochaco and Aoyama try to avoid being sucked into Thirteen's black hole. Aoyama asks Ochaco if she likes Izuku, prompting an unexpected resolution to their match with Thirteen. Kaminari and Mina attempt to evade the buildings being toppled by Principal Nezu as he strategically cuts off their escape routes, but they failed because of Nezu's intelligence. Jiro and Koda, who both have sound-dependent Quirks, struggle to come up with a strategy against Present Mic's overpowering noise. Jiro asks Koda if he can control bugs, to which he confirms and she pleads for him to do so because there is no other way. They do so and overwhelm Present Mic, allowing Jiro and Koda to escape. Then, Shoji creates a distraction to allow Hagakure an opening against Snipe. Midnight takes out Sero quickly, leaving Mineta alone against her somnambulist Quirk. But Mineta states that he put on a scared act to draw her away from the escape gate and reveals himself with Sero's tape wrapped around his face to nullify Midnight's Quirk. She tries to whip him into submission, but Mineta counters with his special move, Grape Rush which uses to stick Midnight and her whip to the ground far away, allowing him to escape and pass the exam. Midnight is impressed by his ingenuity.
37	24	"Katsuki Bakugo: Origin"; Transliteration: "Bakugō Katsuki: Orijin" (Japanese: 爆豪勝己：オリジン)	Tomo Ōkubo	Shinji Satō	September 23, 2017	February 17, 2019	3.4%
The final match of the final exams pits Izuku and Bakugo against All Might. Izuku struggles to convince Bakugo to work with him, especially since Izuku believes they have no choice but to escape and Bakugo seems determined to fight All Might head-on. Due to being hasty while fighting the teacher, Bakugo chooses to lose rather than working with Izuku. All Might was about to finish him off, until Izuku punches Bakugo away and grabs him before retreating into a back alleyway. After Izuku recalls the time during the first grade when Bakugo defended himself from his friends about being an amazing hero will always win, Bakugo agrees to work with him although he is still angered in this situation. Even with All Might's diminishing strength and weights, both students face serious injuries as they put everything they have into the fight. Inspired by Bakugo's resolve, Izuku leaps into action and hits All Might with a smash. He quickly grabs his partner and makes for the escape gate. All Might notes that Izuku could have escaped alone, but it has always been the part of his being to help those in need. They passed the exam, with the friends cheering them in the monitoring room. In Recovery Girl's office, she heals Izuku and Bakugo while berating All Might for hitting them too hard. All Might muses over the boys' performance, proud that they can both grow stronger because they smile in the face of adversity.
38	25	"Encounter"; Transliteration: "Enkauntā" (Japanese: エンカウンター)	Takudai Kakuchi	Kō Matsuo	September 30, 2017	February 24, 2019	3.9%
At the League of Villains hideout, two visitors express interest in joining the League of Villains. Shigaraki resents the fact that Stain's ideology has inspired so many people when his own approach has not been nearly as successful. Meanwhile, at U.A. High's Class 1-A homeroom, those who believe they failed the practical section of final exams fear that they will not be able to go to the training camp during summer vacation. But Aizawa enters the room and telling everyone that they are going regardless of their result in the final exams. The students will go to training camp to get stronger as long as the teachers left out to make their work in able to win. He calls it again the rational deception, which upsets many of the students who felt that they were tricked. Izuku and his classmates go on a shopping trip to prepare for summer training camp. At the mall, Shigaraki appears and briefly holds Izuku hostage. Before leaving, he explains his ideology and motives to Izuku before Ochaco shows up. The U.A. High's first term ended and summer vacation is about to begin, while All for One plans to groom Shigaraki to replace him in the future.

== Recap special ==
No. overall	No. in season	Title	Directed by	Original release date	Viewership rating
13.5	0	"Hero Notebook"; Transliteration: "Hīrō Nōto (Note: Hero Note)" (Japanese: ヒーローノート)	Nobutaka Yoda	March 25, 2017	3.3%
A recap special of the first season.

== Home video release ==
=== Japanese ===
Toho released the second season of the anime on DVD and Blu-ray in eight volumes in Japan, with the first volume released on July 19, 2017, and the final volume released on February 14, 2018.

Toho Animation (Japan – Region 2/A)
Volume	Episodes	Release date	Ref.
1	14–17	July 19, 2017	
2	18–20	August 9, 2017	
3	20–23	September 13, 2017	
4	24–26	October 18, 2017	
5	27–29	November 15, 2017	
6	30–32	December 13, 2017	
7	33–35	January 17, 2018	
8	36–38	February 14, 2018	

=== English ===
Funimation released the second season in North America in two volumes, with the first volume being released on April 3, 2018, and the second volume released on June 5, 2018. Both volumes received a limited edition combo release, a standard edition combo release, and a standard edition DVD release. The complete parts of two volumes received a Blu-ray release on September 17, 2020. Sony Pictures UK distributed the season in the United Kingdom and Ireland, and released on standard edition DVD and Blu-ray volumes between April 2 and June 11, 2018. Manga Entertainment later released the season in the United Kingdom and Ireland for Funimation as a complete set on September 21, 2020. Universal Sony distributed the season in Australia and New Zealand, and released in limited edition volumes between May 9 and June 13, 2018, and on standard edition volumes on August 15, 2018. Funimation later released the season in Australia and New Zealand through Madman Entertainment, with the combo editions for two parts released on December 4, 2019.

Funimation (North America – Region 1/A)
Part		Episodes	Release date	Ref.
Season 2	1	13.5–25	April 3, 2018	
Season 2	2	26–38	June 5, 2018	
Season 2	Complete	13.5–38	September 17, 2020	

Sony Pictures UK / Manga Entertainment (United Kingdom and Ireland – Region 2/B)
Part		Episodes	Release date	Ref.
Season 2	1	13.5–25	April 2, 2018	
Season 2	2	26–38	June 11, 2018	
Season 2	Complete	13.5–38	September 21, 2020	

Universal Sony / Madman Entertainment (Australia and New Zealand – Region 4/B)
Part		Episodes	Release date	Ref.
Season 2	1 (Limited Edition)	13.5–25	May 9, 2018	
Season 2	2 (Limited Edition)	26–38	June 13, 2018	
Season 2	1	13.5–25	August 15, 2018 (Universal Sony); December 4, 2019 (Madman)	
Season 2	2	26–38	August 15, 2018; December 4, 2019 (Madman)	
