= Solo Leveling season 2 =

Second season of the anime TV series

Solo Leveling: Arise from the Shadow
- Season 2
- Cover art for the first home media volume of the season, featuring protagonist Sung Jin-woo
- No. of episodes: 13

Release
- Original network: Tokyo MX, GYT, GTV, BS11
- Original release: January 5 – March 30, 2025

Season chronology
- ← Previous; Season 1

Solo Leveling is an anime television series based on Chugong's South Korean web novel of the same name. After the broadcast of the first season finale, a second season, titled Solo Leveling: Arise from the Shadow, was announced. The season is produced by A-1 Pictures and directed by Shunsuke Nakashige, with Noboru Kimura writing the scripts, Tomoko Sudo designing the characters, and Hiroyuki Sawano composing the music. It aired from January 5 to March 30, 2025, on Tokyo MX and other networks. (Note: Tokyo MX, GYT, GTV and BS11 all list the season premiere as January 4 at 24:00, which is effectively January 5 at midnight JST)

The second season takes place directly after the events of the first season and picks up with Sung Jin-woo embracing his newfound powers as the Shadow Monarch. While he keeps his new powers a secret from people around him, a strange hunter who has been lost for nearly ten years returns with a dire warning of an upcoming catastrophe.

A compilation film of the first season, titled Solo Leveling: ReAwakening, was screened along with the first two episodes of the second season in Japan from November 29 to December 12, 2024. Crunchyroll acquired the North American and select international rights for the compilation film, screening it in the United States and Canada beginning on December 6, 2024.

The opening theme song is "Reawaker" performed by LiSA (feat. Felix of Stray Kids), while the ending theme song is "Un-Apex" performed by TK from Ling Tosite Sigure. Crunchyroll licensed the season outside of Asia. Medialink licensed the season in Southeast Asia and Oceania (except Australia and New Zealand).

== Episodes ==
| No. overall | No. in season | Title | Directed by | Written by | Storyboarded by | Chief animation directed by | Original release date |
|---|---|---|---|---|---|---|---|
| 13 | 1 | "You Aren't E-Rank, Are You?" | Yūya Horiuchi | Shigeru Murakoshi | Yūya Horiuchi | Tomoko Sudo | January 5, 2025 |
At a guardian/teacher conference for Jin-ah, Jin-woo is asked to convince truant Han Song-Yi to return to school; she refuses to give up her life as a Hunter. To convince her otherwise, Jin-woo gets Sangmin to allow them on a C-Rank dungeon expedition led by A-Rank Kim Chul, but the dungeon transforms and traps the Hunters in a snowy wasteland. Chul abandons the lower ranked Hunters to fight the dungeon boss Baruka, only to have his party wiped out. Dongsoo arrives in Japan, seeking revenge on Jin-woo and Jin-ho for his brother's death.
| 14 | 2 | "I Suppose You Aren't Aware" | Tatsuya Sasaki | Fūka Ishii | Makoto Muta | Chiaki Furuzumi | January 12, 2025 |
Outside the gate, Dongsoo and Baek Yoonho nearly come to blows, but Dongsoo leaves after being convinced that Jin-woo is guaranteed to die in the dungeon. An unraveling Chul blames Jin-woo for his party's death and attacks him, leading Baruka to their location. Baruka notes that Jin-woo doesn't appear as human to him. Jin-woo uses his Shadow Army to distract Baruka's army, then kills Chul and resurrects him as Iron to kill Baruka, allowing the group to leave. Yoonho confronts Jin-woo over the death of most of the party but is forced to back off. The experience convinces Song-Yi to return to school, though she still expresses a desire to be a Hunter.
| 15 | 3 | "Still a Long Way to Go" | Kōji Furukuwa | Noboru Kimura | Hiroki Hirano | Hirotaka Tokuda | January 19, 2025 |
After being trapped in a Gate for ten years, Sung Il-Hwan, Jin-woo's father, escapes through a Gate in the United States. Dongsoo tries to interrogate Il-hwan, who warns Dongsoo about an imminent threat instead, and when Dongsoo taunts him over his intent to kill Jin-woo, Il-Hwan hospitalizes him and escapes custody. Jin-ho acquires his guild certification and convinces his father to let him run the company's guild, under the condition that he convince Jin-woo to join. With his newfound strength, Jin-woo reenters the S-Rank dungeon and acquires two of the three materials needed for the potion.
| 16 | 4 | "I Need to Stop Faking" | Makiko Hayase | Noboru Kimura | Makiko Hayase | Tomoko Katasho & Hiromi Ogata | January 26, 2025 |
Jin-woo decides to get his rank reassessed so he can attempt higher-level dungeons. He is classified as the tenth S-Rank Hunter in South Korea; consequently, he receives offers from various guilds as well as their overseeing agency, the Hunters Association, all of which he declines. In preparation to take on the S-Rank dungeon's boss, Jin-woo considers selling one of his items to buy equipment, but he realizes that the item in question is too powerful for him to conceivably have as an E-Rank Hunter. To create a cover story, Jin-woo signs up on a mining crew sent to clean up an A-Rank dungeon being handled by the Hunters Guild. During a lunch break, Jin-woo considers challenging the boss but is confronted by S-Rank Hunter Cha Hae-In.
| 17 | 5 | "This Is What We're Trained to Do" | Kento Toya | Shigeru Murakoshi | Kento Toya | Tomoko Sudo | February 2, 2025 |
At Hae-In's request, Jin-woo leaves; Hae-In notes that unlike other Hunters, Jin-woo smells nice to her, piquing her interest. Jin-woo is invited to help the mining team on another dungeon, where he also agrees to be a porter for the expedition party and surreptitiously assists them in combat. However, the gate locks the group inside, and they are brought before the dungeon boss, the giant orc Kargalgan.
| 18 | 6 | "Don't Look Down on My Guys" | Takayuki Kikuchi | Fūka Ishii | Takayuki Kikuchi | Hirotaka Tokuda | February 9, 2025 |
Kargalgan nearly kills the party leader, forcing Jin-woo to reveal himself. Jin-woo kills Kargalgan and resurrects him as Tusk while the Hunters Association swears the party to secrecy. Jin-ho asks Jin-woo to join the company guild. Meanwhile, famous actor Lee Minsung awakens to Hunter powers to much fanfare.
| 19 | 7 | "The 10th S-Rank Hunter" | Hiromu Ōshiro | Yoshikazu Tominaga | Hiromu Ōshiro | Chiaki Furuzumi | February 16, 2025 |
Jin-woo arrives for his reassessment, overshadowing Minsung's press conference to announce his Hunter assessment. Baek Yoon-ho and Choi Jong-in try to recruit Jin-woo after he is officially designated as the tenth S-Rank Hunter in South Korea. Using his new status, Jin-woo sells items to purchase gear for the S-rank dungeon. Jin-woo sends his shadow army to fight the S-rank dungeon's beasts and must personally fight four knights similar to Igris. Elsewhere, Jin-ho's father becomes ill due to magic exposure and a flying ant appears in South Korea, wiping out an entire town before local hunters manage to halt its rampage.
| 20 | 8 | "Looking Up Was Tiring Me Out" | Tatsuya Sasaki | Noboru Kimura | Yuka Kuroda & Yoshihiro Kanno | Hiromi Ogata, Tomoko Katasho & Yukiko Busa | February 23, 2025 |
In the Demon's Castle, Jin-woo befriends the demon noble Esil, who helps guide him to the final floor. On the final floor, Jin-woo fights Demon King Baran, who rides a massive white dragon. Jin-woo just barely manages to defeat Baran, gaining the ability to swap places with one of his Shadow Soldiers and also resurrecting the dragon as Kaisel. Meanwhile, the Korean Hunters Association partners with its Japanese counterpart to plan a fourth Jeju Island operation in order to counter the quickly evolving flying ants.
| 21 | 9 | "It Was All Worth It" | Yūya Horiuchi | Shigeru Murakoshi | Yūya Horiuchi | Chiaki Furuzumi | March 2, 2025 |
Upon using the potion gained from clearing the Demon's Castle, Jin-woo's mother recovers and poignantly reunites with Jin-woo and Jin-ah, eventually moving back in with them. As such, Jin-woo refuses when Baek approaches him to join the Jeju Island operation. In an effort to convince him, Baek has him meet the combined force of S-Ranks. The Japanese and Korean S-Rank Hunters agree to train through a 4v4 duel.
| 22 | 10 | "We Need a Hero" | Hirotaka Tokuda | Fūka Ishii | Hirotaka Tokuda | Hirotaka Tokuda | March 9, 2025 |
The Japanese S-Rank Hunters win the duel, though Jin-woo is forced to step in to protect Hae-In. The Guild Master Goto Ryuji challenges Jin-woo to a duel, but it's called off partway when the duel escalates. Jin-woo again refuses the offer to join the operation, though he hides his soldiers in the Hunters' shadows. The operation starts off well, only for a creature to begin slaughtering the Japanese S-Rank Hunters.
| 23 | 11 | "It's Going to Get Even More Intense" | Kento Toya | Yoshikazu Tominaga | Kento Toya | Tomoko Sudo | March 16, 2025 |
The Korean S-Rank Hunters successfully kill the Ant Queen but learn that she gave birth to a superpowered Ant King, who proceeds to tear through their ranks, incapacitating Hae-In and injuring several others, after which he kills Min Byung-Gyu, the healer. Goto confronts the Ant King as a horde of ants arrive to attack the Hunters, but he is swiftly dealt with along with six other Japanese Hunters. Recognizing the danger the operation is in, Jin-woo activates his Shadow Soldiers and swaps places with one of them to join the fray.
| 24 | 12 | "Are You the King of Humans?" | Ryūtarō Suzuki | Noboru Kimura | Ryūtarō Suzuki & Yoshihiro Kanno | Hirotaka Tokuda | March 23, 2025 |
Jin-woo uses his potions to heal the Korean hunters, though Hae-in is too gravely injured to be healed. Jin-woo's army holds off the ants while Jin-woo faces off against the Ant King and manages to beat it into submission. Realizing its inferiority, the Ant King fearfully attempts to run away, but Jin-woo chases it down and mutilates it. With the threat neutralized, Jin-woo tries to use the Elixir of Life on Hae-In, but that does not work either. In desperation, Jin-woo turns to a voice calling out to him.
| 25 | 13 | "On to the Next Target" | Shunsuke Nakashige | Shunsuke Nakashige | Shunsuke Nakashige | Tomoko Sudo, Chiaki Furuzumi, Hirotaka Tokuda & Kento Toya | March 30, 2025 |
Jin-woo finds that the voice is Byung-Gyu's soul. Jin-woo raises him as a Shadow, and he promptly heals Hae-in's injuries; at Baek's request, Jin-woo subsequently releases his soul. The remaining ants go haywire and attack the Hunters on the ships and mainland Korea's shores. Jin-woo raises the Ant King, who exhibits the ability to speak due to its high rank; he names it Beru. Using Beru and the risen ant army, Jin-woo clears the ants. In the aftermath, Jin-woo is touted as a hero by the media, though some criticize him for not participating from the beginning. He prepares to start his own guild. On Jeju Island, a clean-up crew encounters two strange and powerful beings, who immediately neutralize them and disappear through a gate; Il-hwan secretly observes the affair. Hae-in decides to train to get closer to Jin-woo.

== Home media release ==
=== Japanese ===
Aniplex (Japan – Region 2/A)
| Vol. | Episodes | Release date | Ref. |
|---|---|---|---|
| 1 | 13–18 | April 23, 2025 | |
| 2 | 19–25 | June 25, 2025 | |

=== English ===
Crunchyroll, LLC (North America – Region 1/A)
| Vol. | Discs | Episodes | Standard edition release date | Limited edition release date | Ref. |
|---|---|---|---|---|---|
| Season 2 | 4 | 13–25 | March 17, 2026 | | |
