= Solo Leveling season 1 =

First season of the anime TV series

Solo Leveling
- Season 1
- Cover art for the first home media volume of the season, featuring protagonist Sung Jin-woo
- No. of episodes: 12

Release
- Original network: Tokyo MX, GYT, GTV, BS11
- Original release: January 7 – March 31, 2024

Season chronology
- Next → Season 2

Solo Leveling is an anime television series based on Chugong's South Korean web novel of the same name. It is produced by A-1 Pictures and directed by Shunsuke Nakashige, with Noboru Kimura writing the scripts, Tomoko Sudo designing the characters, and Hiroyuki Sawano composing the music. The first season was originally scheduled for 2023, but was delayed and later aired from January 7 to March 31, 2024, on Tokyo MX and other networks. (Note: Tokyo MX, GYT, GTV and BS11 all list the series premiere as January 6 at 24:00, which is effectively January 7 at midnight JST)

The story takes place in a world where there are passages called "Gates" that connect another dimension to the present world, and where people with special abilities called "Hunters" exist. One day, Sung Jin-woo, the lowest-ranked Hunter, known as the weakest weapon of humanity, suddenly gains the power to "level up" on his own.

Crunchyroll streams the series worldwide except in East Asia. The first episode was screened in Tokyo, Seoul, Los Angeles, India, and Europe in December 2023.

The opening theme song is "Level" performed by SawanoHiroyuki[nZk]: Tomorrow X Together, while the ending theme song is "Request" performed by Krage. Crunchyroll licensed the series outside of Asia. Medialink licensed the series in Southeast Asia and Oceania (except Australia and New Zealand).

== Episodes ==
No. overall	No. in season	Title	Directed by	Written by	Storyboarded by	Chief animation directed by	Original release date
1	1	"I'm Used to It"	Shunsuke Nakashige	Noboru Kimura	Shunsuke Nakashige & Hirotaka Tokuda	N/A	January 7, 2024
Sung Jin-woo, considered the weakest Hunter in the world, enters a dungeon gate with his healer friend Lee Joo-hee and other stronger Hunters. After the boss is killed, the gate does not collapse but instead reveals a second connected dungeon. The party is split evenly on whether or not to proceed; Jin-woo casts the tiebreaker to send them into the second half of the double dungeon. The party finds the dungeon empty save for a large room filled with statues, which come alive and begin slaughtering the Hunters.
2	2	"If I Had One More Chance"	Yūya Horiuchi	Fūka Ishii	Yūya Horiuchi	Chiaki Furuzumi	January 14, 2024
Jin-woo realizes that the dungeon they are in has specific rules by which to survive the statues: first to "revere God," second to "praise God," and finally to "prove your faith to God." Several Hunters are killed as Jin-woo and the senior Hunter leading the party, Song Chi-yul, slowly decipher the instructions on how to survive. Finally, only Mr. Song, Joo-hee (who has collapsed from stress), and Jin-woo are left. Jin-woo tells Mr. Song to evacuate with Joo-hee while he holds the door open. Left alone, Jin-woo rages against his imminent death. However, as he dies, he receives a message that he has completed the hidden quest and may become a Player if he accepts the offer.
3	3	"It's Like a Game"	Takayuki Kikuchi	Shingo Irie	Takayuki Kikuchi	Tomoko Sudo	January 21, 2024
Jin-woo wakes up after three days of sleep, initially thinking that he only dreamed the events of the double dungeon. Investigators from the Hunters Association confirm that it really did happen (Joo-hee is traumatized, and Mr. Song is likely to retire after losing his arm) and check if Jin-woo experienced the very rare "second awakening", in which a Hunter experiences an increase in ability. The test results come back negative. Jin-woo discovers a message similar to the one that declared him a Player, with daily goals and a penalty for failing to complete them. After skipping the first day and nearly dying when he is thrown into a penalty quest, Jin-woo begins completing his daily goals. He receives stat bonuses and loot boxes, which result in him receiving a special item: an instance dungeon key. He enters and is confronted by a wolf monster stronger than anything he had fought before.
4	4	"I've Gotta Get Stronger"	Tōru Hamazaki	Shingo Irie	Ikurō Morimoto & Yoshihiro Kanno	Hirotaka Tokuda	January 28, 2024
Jin-woo successfully kills the wolf and gains a level. He continues through the dungeon, killing more wolves and gaining strength before defeating the dungeon's boss. Elsewhere, a dungeon break occurs, allowing a golem to enter the real world after its dungeon was not properly cleared. Arriving Hunters, including a PTSD-stricken Joo-hee, fail to deal any damage. Emerging from the instance, Jin-woo is guided to the battle and throws his broken sword into the golem boss, shattering its defense and allowing the Hunters to take it down. He departs, reflecting that the golem must have been more injured than he'd expected.
5	5	"A Pretty Good Deal"	Makiko Hayase	Norimitsu Kaihō	Makiko Hayase	Chiaki Furuzumi	February 4, 2024
Jin-woo joins C-rank Hunter Hwang Dongsuk and his five associates in a pick-up group to tackle a C-rank insect dungeon, with the contract stipulating that Jin-woo doesn't have to fight but won't get any battle drops. Jin-woo becomes suspicious of Dongsuk's motives. Rounding out the eight-member requirement to enter the dungeon is first-timer D-rank Yoo Jin-ho, whose family wealth has equipped him with expensive and powerful gear. After the Hunters defeat a wave of monster ants, they find the dungeon boss, a giant sleeping spider in a room with valuable mana crystals. Jin-ho reviews Jin-woo's contract and notes that since the crystals aren't battle drops, Jin-woo should get a full share. In retaliation, Dongsuk and his party spring their plan to keep everything for themselves and trap Jin-woo and Jin-ho in the boss room, waking up the spider. Jin-woo prepares to kill the dungeon boss.
6	6	"The Real Hunt Begins"	Takashi Sakuma	Norimitsu Kaihō	Takashi Sakuma & Yoshihiro Kanno	Tomoko Sudo	February 11, 2024
Jin-woo successfully defeats the boss, much to Jin-ho's shock. When Dongsuk and his group re-enter the boss room, they attempt to coerce Jin-ho into killing Jin-woo, but Jin-ho refuses. Jin-woo receives a new quest to kill Dongsuk's group under penalty of death, leading him to massacre them before quickly beheading Dongsuk. He exits the dungeon with Jin-ho, using the cover story of the others having been slain by the dungeon monsters.
7	7	"Let's See How Far I Can Go"	Yūya Horiuchi	Shigeru Murakoshi	Yūya Horiuchi	Hirotaka Tokuda	February 18, 2024
Jin-ho offers Jin-woo a building in exchange for his help in fulfilling requirements for guild certification; Jin-woo rejects the offer. Jin-woo notices his daily mission goals keep incrementing past the requirements. Upon maxing them out, he is rewarded with another instance key, this time to an S-rank dungeon that rewards a special potion that can heal any illness. Jin-woo realizes the potion can cure his mother and decides to risk it. The first battle within the dungeon is against a guardian Cerberus, which nearly kills Jin-woo multiple times before he finally manages to slay the beast. His reward is the key to the castle Cerberus was guarding, within which are the ingredients to craft the potion. Knowing he would die if he pressed on, he promises to return later. Meanwhile, the Hunters Association investigates the death of Dongsuk after learning the dungeon boss was defeated. Dongsuk's younger brother, the S-rank Dongsoo, blames Jin-woo and Jin-ho and swears revenge.
8	8	"This Is Frustrating"	Hiromu Ōshiro	Shunsuke Nakashige	Hiromu Ōshiro	Chiaki Furuzumi	March 3, 2024
Jin-woo visits his comatose mother and decides to get stronger so that he can get the needed ingredients to save her. He accepts Jin-ho's request to aid in the creation of a guild. To fulfill the party member requirement for a C-rank dungeon, the Hunters Association recruits most of the survivors of the double dungeon raid (Jin-woo, Joo-hee, Mr. Song, Kim Sangshik, and Kang Jeongho). Due to a shortage of Hunters in the area, the group is rounded out by three imprisoned Hunters, who serve in exchange for reduced sentences. The prisoners are overseen by B-rank Kang Taeshik.
9	9	"You've Been Hiding Your Skills"	Hirotaka Tokuda	Shingo Irie	Hirotaka Tokuda	Tomoko Sudo & Hirotaka Tokuda	March 10, 2024
At a three-way junction, the group splits up. Kang Taeshik uses the opportunity to murder the prisoners (having previously been bribed by the father of one of their victims). When Jeongho and Sangshik's path leads them to stumble upon the scene, Kang kills them to cover it up. Jin-woo, Joo-hee, and Mr. Song discover the aftermath; Jin-woo reveals his newfound power and kills Kang. When the Hunters Association investigates the event, a grateful Mr. Song claims he killed Kang to cover for Jin-woo.
10	10	"What Is This, a Picnic?"	Yūya Horiuchi & Takashi Sakuma	Yoshikazu Tominaga	Kōki Onoue	Hirotaka Tokuda	March 17, 2024
Joo-hee tells Jin-woo she is retiring as a Hunter. Jin-ho buys the dungeon rights for multiple C-rank dungeons and recruits low-ranked Hunters to fill dungeon requirements while Jin-woo and Jin-ho are the only ones who go in to clear them. Ahn Sangmin, the White Tiger Guild's Second Administration Team manager, notices that Jin-woo has survived several dangerous missions and deduces that Jin-woo must have reawakened. He attempts to recruit Jin-woo but fails. Jin-woo receives a message: having achieved a level requirement, he is now offered a job-change quest.
11	11	"A Knight Who Defends an Empty Throne"	Takayuki Kikuchi	Noboru Kimura	Takayuki Kikuchi	Chiaki Furuzumi	March 24, 2024
Jin-woo starts the job-change quest and is teleported to a massive castle. After fighting waves of knights, assassins, and mages (mimicking enemies he fought previously) he confronts Igris, the Bloodred Knight Commander. Igris matches or exceeds Jin-woo in speed and strength; Jin-woo only barely manages to slay the knight. Afterward, the actual job-change quest activates, unleashing an unending horde of knights and mages. Meanwhile, the S-rank hunters of Korea head for Jeju Island, which was the site of an S-rank dungeon break years ago.
12	12	"Arise"	Shunsuke Nakashige	Noboru Kimura	Shunsuke Nakashige	Tomoko Sudo	March 31, 2024
Overwhelmed by the seemingly endless horde, Jin-woo nearly despairs. The timer for the daily quest, which Jin-woo forgot to do that day, expires; he is transferred to a penalty zone, which he uses to recover and prepare. Returning to the castle, he succeeds in defeating the horde. As a reward he gains the title "Shadow Monarch" and the ability to bring the dead, including Igris, back to life as his "shadow army." Meanwhile, the S-rank hunters make a horrifying discovery: the Jeju Island S-rank monsters are evolving and now threaten to spread to the mainland.

== Recap special ==
No. overall	No. in season	Title	Original release date
7.5	SP	"How to Get Stronger"	February 25, 2024
A recap special covering the first seven episodes of the season.

== Home media release ==
=== Japanese ===
Aniplex (Japan – Region 2/A)
Vol.	Episodes	Release date	Ref.
1	1–3	March 27, 2024	
2	4–6	April 24, 2024	
3	7–9	May 29, 2024	
4	10–12	June 26, 2024	

=== English ===
Crunchyroll, LLC (North America – Region 1/A)
Vol.	Discs	Episodes	Standard edition release date	Limited edition release date	Ref.
Season 1	4	1–12	July 22, 2025		
