= Kabaneri of the Iron Fortress =

2016 Japanese anime television series

- Key visual for the series

甲鉄城のカバネリ (Kōtetsujō no Kabaneri)
- Genre: Dark fantasy; Post-apocalyptic; Steampunk
- Anime television series
- Directed by: Tetsurō Araki
- Produced by: Yuka Okayasu; Yōhei Shintaku
- Written by: Ichirō Ōkouchi
- Music by: Hiroyuki Sawano
- Studio: Wit Studio
- Licensed by: Crunchyroll
- Original network: Fuji TV, Kansai TV (Noitamina)
- Original run: April 8, 2016 – June 30, 2016
- Episodes: 12
- Manga
- Written by: Shirō Yoshida
- Published by: Mag Garden
- Magazine: Monthly Comic Garden
- Original run: May 2, 2016 – November 5, 2018
- Volumes: 4
- Anime film

Kabaneri of the Iron Fortress – Part 1: Gathering Light; Kabaneri of the Iron Fortress – Part 2: Burning Life
- Directed by: Tetsurō Araki
- Written by: Ichirō Ōkouchi
- Music by: Hiroyuki Sawano
- Studio: Wit Studio
- Released: December 31, 2016 (part 1); January 7, 2017 (part 2)
- Runtime: 107 minutes (part 1); 104 minutes (part 2)
- Video game

Kōtetsujō no Kabaneri -Ran- Hajimaru Michiato
- Developer: TriFort, Inc.
- Publisher: DMM Games
- Directed by: Junpei Kasaoka
- Music by: Hiroyuki Sawano; Kohta Yamamoto
- Platform: Android, iOS
- Released: December 19, 2018
- Anime film

Kabaneri of the Iron Fortress: The Battle of Unato
- Directed by: Tetsurō Araki
- Produced by: Yuka Okayasu; Wataru Hashimoto
- Written by: Ichirō Ōkouchi (Note: Series Composition (シリーズ構成)); Tetsurō Araki (Note: Screenplay (脚本))
- Music by: Hiroyuki Sawano
- Studio: Wit Studio
- Licensed by: Netflix
- Released: May 10, 2019
- Runtime: 67 minutes (Note: According to the home video release of the film, it is 67 minutes in length. Netflix's three-part release includes both opening and ending credits for every "part", which extends its runtime to 83 minutes.)
- icon

Kabaneri of the Iron Fortress (Japanese: 甲鉄城のカバネリ, Hepburn: Kōtetsujō no Kabaneri) is a Japanese anime television series by Wit Studio. It was broadcast for 12 episodes on Fuji TV's Noitamina programming block from April to June 2016. The series was streamed on Amazon Prime Instant Video service. Two compilation films premiered in Japanese theaters in December 2016 and January 2017. Crunchyroll and Funimation co-released the anime on Blu-ray and DVD in the United States; Crunchyroll also acquired the merchandise rights.

An anime theatrical film that is set six months after the anime series, titled Kabaneri of the Iron Fortress: The Battle of Unato, premiered in May 2019. A Netflix version was released as a three-part series in 2019.

== Plot ==
A mysterious virus appears during the Industrial Revolution that transforms infected humans into Kabane (かばね; "Corpses") and rapidly spreads. Kabane are aggressive, undead creatures that cannot be defeated unless the glowing golden heart, which is protected by a layer of iron, is pierced, or an important body part (such as the head) is completely severed. However, most melee weapons and the steam-pressure guns used by the bushi (武士; "Warriors") are not very effective against them.

On the island country Hinomoto (日ノ本), people have built fortress-like "stations" to shelter themselves from these creatures. People access the stations and transport wares between them with the help of fortified steam locomotives (駿城, hayajirō). One day, a hayajirō hijacked by the kabane crashes into Aragane Station and they overrun the city. A young engineer called Ikoma uses the opportunity to test with success his anti-kabane weapon, the "Piercing Gun" (ツラヌキ筒, Tsuranuki Zutsu), but is infected in the process, although he manages to resist the virus and become a Kabaneri (かばね人), a human-kabane hybrid. Assisted by Mūmei (無名; "Nameless"), another Kabaneri who appears to help them, Ikoma and the other survivors of the station board a hayajirō named Kōtetsujō (甲鉄城; lit. 'Iron Fortress') and depart to seek shelter elsewhere, fighting the hordes of kabane along the way.

== Characters ==
Ikoma (生駒)
Voiced by: Tasuku Hatanaka (Japanese); Robbie Daymond (English)
A young man who makes a living as a steamsmith at Aragane Station. He and his good friend Takumi developed a bolt gun–like weapon called a piercing gun in order to defeat the Kabane. He is very intelligent and a great craftsman, even going as far as to invent and create a piercing gun with enough strength to break the metal cage around a Kabane's heart. When Aragane Station is invaded by Kabane, Ikoma is able to successfully test his piercing gun, killing a Kabane with the bullet and destroying the metal cage protecting its heart, but is unfortunately bitten in the process. He is able to prevent the virus from reaching his brain by blocking his carotid arteries, transforming him into a human/Kabane hybrid, a Kabaneri. After becoming a Kabaneri, his fighting prowess increases. He gains incredible strength and endurance, even shrugging off gunfire and being bitten by Kabane multiple times. Ikoma and Mumei often fight alongside each other against many Kabane and work exceedingly well as a duo. Ikoma makes a promise to Mumei to someday turn her back into a human as he failed to do so in his childhood for his sister.
Mumei (無名; lit. 'No name')
Voiced by: Sayaka Senbongi (Japanese); Janice Kawaye (English)
A mysterious and anonymous girl who boards the hayajiro Kotetsujo and appears at Aragane Station. She is revealed to be a Kabaneri as well as a very strong and agile fighter, capable of killing dozens of Kabane with ease. She became a Kabaneri through a surgical operation as the result of her brainwashing by Biba, making her believe unless she became stronger, she would also end up like her mother. Constant fighting can leave her sleepy and like Ikoma, she requires blood to stop herself from attacking other people. Her birth name is Hozumi (穂積) and she was named Mumei by Biba when he "saved" her as a child. She and Ikoma often fight Kabane together and make a great duo. She treasures Ikoma's promise to one day turn her back into a human, and over the course of the series, Mumei develops feelings for him.
Ayame Yomogawa (四方川 菖蒲, Yomogawa Ayame)
Voiced by: Maaya Uchida (Japanese); Veronica Taylor (English)
The eldest daughter of the Yomogawa family, which governs Aragane Station. After her father is infected, she becomes the leader of the Aragane survivors. Despite her noble status, she's reasonable and understanding, even offering her blood to the Kabaneri. She is also an expert Archer using a steam powered bow. Ayame seems to have feelings for Kurusu, her bodyguard and friend who is around her age. She occasionally practices kendo with him, and Kurusu frequently blushes around her.
Kurusu (来栖)
Voiced by: Toshiki Masuda (Japanese); Jamieson Price (English)
A young Bushi who serves the Yomogawa family as Ayame's personal bodyguard. Among Bushi his skill with a sword is considerable. He is usually somber and honest, and he maintains his honor as a Bushi. Despite initially resenting Ikoma, he eventually recognizes the Kabaneri's usefulness and also starts to respect him. He is later given a reinforced katana that can pierce a Kabane's heart with ease. Kurusu seems to have feelings for Lady Ayame, as he frequently blushes around her.
Takumi (逞生)
Voiced by: Yūki Kaji (Japanese); Ben Diskin (English)
Ikoma's best friend and fellow steam smith, who helped him develop his piercing gun. Towards the end of the series, he is killed by Biba while protecting Ikoma.
Kajika (鰍)
Voiced by: Kanae Oki (Japanese); Colleen O'Shaughnessey (English)
Ikoma and Takumi's friend and fellow steam smith. A friendly and warm-hearted girl takes care of the children that lost their families to the Kabane.
Yukina (侑那)
Voiced by: Mariya Ise (Japanese); Abby Trott (English)
A crew member of the Kotetsujo. A stoic and taciturn girl who, despite being only an apprentice, becomes the Kotetsujo's engineer and driver out of necessity. She might have feelings for Sukari, which are implied in The Battle of Unato film.
Sukari (巣刈)
Voiced by: Ryōta Ōsaka (Japanese); Tom Gibis (English)
A steam smith who lives at Aragane Station. Despite his aloof personality, he's a good mechanic and a decent fighter. He might have feelings for Yukina, which are implied in The Battle of Unato film.
Kibito (吉備土)
Voiced by: Kensuke Satou (Japanese); Kyle Hebert (English)
A Bushi who serves the Yomogawa family. Unlike other Bushis, he's reasonable and even friendly to the Kabaneri. He and his fellow Bushi are later given reinforced bullets that can penetrate the Kabane more easily. He is also good friends with Kurusu.
Suzuki (鈴木)
Voiced by: Maxwell Powers (Japanese); Elijah Ungvary (English)
The train's chief mechanic who has hair like a 17th-century wig and speaks with English phrases. Also serves as the narrator for the series' episode previews.
Biba Amatori (天鳥 美馬, Amatori Biba)
Voiced by: Mamoru Miyano (Japanese); Roger Craig Smith (English)
The Leader of the Hunters (狩方衆, Karikatashū) and the eldest son of the shogun. Charismatic, ruthless and manipulative, he inducted Mumei in his philosophy of strength superiority, where the weak don't deserve to live and should not even have the will to. He greatly resents his father for abandoning him and the 400,000 men he sent to fight on the front lines by essentially starving them of supplies. This made him develop his philosophy, making his purpose from that point to kill his father and show him how weak his fear made him. To do that he intends to destroy the Kongokaku (the shogun's stronghold) using artificially created Kabaneri, and the blue blood he developed, making artificial hybrid colonies when injected with huge destructive power.
Horobi (滅火)
Voiced by: Aya Endō (Japanese); Cissy Jones (English)
A Kabaneri member of the Hunters. She is turned into a Black Fog (黒煙, Kuro Keburi) by Biba in order to destroy the Iwato Station, only for the virus to go out of control and mutate her even more. She only stops at the sight of Biba at which point he callously murders her.
Uryuu (瓜生)
Voiced by: Kaito Ishikawa (Japanese); Chris Niosi (English)
The Captain of the Hunters, who serves under Biba Amatori.
Kageyuki (影雪)
Voiced by: Shin-ichiro Miki (Japanese); Kyle McCarley (English)
The erstwhile Lord of Unato Station. Five years before the Battle of Unato, he shared a close and loving relationship with his daughter, Miyuki. However, when the station is attacked by the Kabane, he is infected with the virus, but he becomes a Kabaneri instead of a full-fledged Kabane. He is surrounded by soldiers threatening to shoot him; he asks his friend, Unmo, whether he is a man or a Kabane. Miyuki tries to stop the soldiers from shooting her father, only to be mistakenly killed. A devastated and enraged Kageyuki goes on a rampage and brutally murders the soldiers in the room. Unmo escapes, but Kageyuki bites his daughter's corpse, wanting her to come back by any means necessary, turning her into a Nue. The Nue forms a nest around the Unato Castle, keeping Unato trapped in a perennial battle against the Kabane.

== Media ==
=== Anime ===
Kabaneri of the Iron Fortress was directed by Tetsurō Araki and written by Ichirō Ōkouchi, with music by Hiroyuki Sawano and original character designs by Haruhiko Mikimoto. The series was broadcast on Fuji TV's Noitamina block from April 8 to June 30, 2016, with a total of 12 episodes. A prologue for the anime premiered for a week in theaters across Japan starting March 18, 2016. Amazon streamed the series on their Amazon Prime Instant Video service. Two compilation films premiered in Japanese theaters on December 31, 2016, and January 7, 2017. Crunchyroll and Funimation co-released the anime on Blu-ray and DVD in the United States; Crunchyroll also acquired the merchandise rights.

An anime theatrical film that is set six months after the anime series, titled Kabaneri of the Iron Fortress: The Battle of Unato (甲鉄城のカバネリ 〜海門決戦〜, Kōtetsujō no Kabaneri: Unato Kessen), premiered on May 10, 2019. A Netflix version was released as a three-part series in 2019.

==== Episodes ====
No.	Title	Directed by	Written by	Original release date	Ref.
1	"Frightened Corpse"; Transliteration: "Obieru Shikabane" (Japanese: 脅える屍)	Hiroyuki Tanaka; Tetsuaki Watanabe; Tetsurō Araki	Ichirō Ōkouchi	April 8, 2016	
On the island country of Hinomoto, the hayajiro Kōtetsujō, an armored train, is attacked by several Kabane, humans transformed into undead creatures by a viral infection, and the bushi defeat them. However, a bushi is bitten, forcing him to commit suicide to avoid becoming a Kabane. At the train's destination, Aragane Station (顕金駅), Ikoma, a steamsmith, is working on a powerful piercing gun to kill the Kabane. The Kōtetsujō arrives at Aragane Station and Ikoma steals some Kabane body parts. Kensho, the leader of the Yomogawa family, excuses Shimon and Mumei, two passengers from the mandatory Kabane inspection who are headed for Kongokaku. Ikoma is detained for insubordination and is secretly visited by Mumei as she is intrigued by his personality and interest in the Kabane. Later, another hayajiro called Fusōjō (扶桑城) approaches the station. The defensive drawbridge is lowered, but as the train exits the tunnel, it's revealed that the Kabane have taken over the train, making it crash through the defending wall, allowing them to attack the station. Ikoma flees to his home, lures a Kabane to the house and kills it with his invention, but is bitten in the process and begins to transform into a Kabane. Using several painful and potentially fatal techniques, Ikoma stops his blood flow enough to keep it from carrying the virus to his brain, reverting to his human form and passing out. Meanwhile, Mumei kills a Kabane using a blade which forms the base of her shoe.
2	"Never-Ending Night"; Transliteration: "Akenu Yoru" (Japanese: 明けぬ夜)	Hiroyuki Tanaka	Ichirō Ōkouchi	April 22, 2016 (Note: Due to special news coverage of the 2016 Kumamoto earthquake that hit the Kumamoto Prefecture in Japan on April 14, episode 2 that was originally scheduled to air on April 15, 2016, was delayed on Fuji TV and Amazon Prime Video to April 22, 2016.)	
Ikoma, discovering that he has stopped the Kabane virus from infecting him, tells his fellow steamsmith Takumi of his success with his bolt gun and anti-virus technique. Meanwhile, survivors of the Kabane attack fight a defensive battle within Aragane Station while seeking an opportunity to escape in the Kōtetsujō. Mumei arrives dressed in battle gear and offers to clear the way so Yukina, the sole remaining engineer and an apprentice, can commander the Kōtetsujō. She leaps into the midst of the Kabane and leads them away, killing several in the process. The remaining citizens then rush to board the train. Meanwhile, Ikoma and Takumi attempt to join the others onboard with his gun. Mumei detects something different about Ikoma and vouches for his boarding the Kōtetsujō. Ayame Yomogawa, Kensho's daughter, produces the special key to start the train's engine while her bodyguard Kurusu takes command, and tells Mumei to defend the train's rear, but she refuses and falls asleep. While fending off a Kabane, Ikoma's infected heart is exposed, and he is forced off the Kōtetsujō. However, the train is stopped by a malfunction of the drawbridge, and the passengers witness Ikoma killing the Kabane. Lecturing the passengers for their distrust, Ikoma manually releases the drawbridge for the train. Despite the bushi's objections, Takumi and Mumei get Ikoma back on the Kōtetsujō as it leaves Aragane Station behind. Before Kurusu can kill him, Mumei intervenes and reveals that she and Ikoma are Kabaneri – beings with an existence between humans and Kabane.
3	"Prayer Offer"; Transliteration: "Sasageru Inori" (Japanese: 捧げる祈り)	Hitomi Ezoe	Ichirō Ōkouchi	April 29, 2016	
After Mumei reveals her identity as a Kabaneri, Ayame stops Kurusu from killing the Kabaneri and reminds everyone that they were rescued by Ikoma and Mumei. The Kōtetsujō is headed for Kongokaku, the shōgun's greatest stronghold and Mumei insists on staying onboard. However, the passengers are filled with alarm and distrust because of a lack of food and water, doubt whether they will be admitted into Kongokaku, and presence of the Kabaneri accompanying them. Mumei reveals that she has a mission and needs help from him because she gets exhausted after fighting. She begins training Ikoma personally in preparation for future Kabane attacks. The train has to stop for water and repairs, and the passengers take the opportunity to pray for those who died at Aragane Station. Ikoma tells Mumei that he has vowed to avenge his sister's death at the hands of the Kabane and a green stone tied to his palm which seems to have some effect on the Kabane. Mumei reveals that Kabaneri can only survive by drinking human blood, and later kills a pregnant woman who becomes a Kabane. Meanwhile, Ayame attacks Ikoma, but Ikoma tells her about his vow, appeasing the passengers' fears of the Kabaneri. However, Ikoma becomes delirious from his own need of blood and attacks Ayame.
4	"Flowing Blood"; Transliteration: "Nagaru Chishio" (Japanese: 流る血潮)	Tetsuaki Watanabe	Ichirō Ōkouchi	May 6, 2016	
Kurusu rescues Ayame, just as the Kabane appear in the woods surrounding the Kōtetsujō, and everyone gets back onboard. Still fearful of the Kabaneri, the Six Chiefs, led by Akoji, has Ayame hand over the Kōtetsujō's Master Key. To Ayame's dismay, Akoji reroutes the Kōtetsujō for the mountains to provide a shorter route to Kongokaku, in spite of the increased danger posed by the Kabane on the exposed mountain path. Then, Akoji dispatches a chief to get Takumi and fellow steam smiths Kajika and Sukari to the Kōtetsujō's last car with Mumei and Ikoma and detach the car. However, the Kabane, including by a sword wielding Wazatori (a Kabane that has learned combat techniques and is thus much more dangerous), ambushes the Kōtetsujō and kills some of its passengers. Ayame, Kurusu and the bushi hold off the Kabane while the surviving passengers escape to the train's front. Using his sword-wielding skills, Kurusu fights the remaining Kabane inside the train at close quarters. Simultaneously, Mumei, Ikoma and their allies escape from their car and fight the Kabane, but Mumei falls asleep from exhaustion. Kurusu fights the Wazatori but is injured in the process. With Ikoma in need of fresh blood, Ayame slashes her arm and replenishes him with her blood. After Ikoma kills the Wazatori, Ayame leads a cry of "rokkon shōjō!" (六根清浄!) to celebrate their victory. Ayame regains the Master Key and declares that she will allow the Kabaneri to stay aboard the Kōtetsujō, offering her blood to help sustain them. Ikoma's friends and a number of others, including Kurusu, voluntarily join her.
5	"Inescapable Darkness"; Transliteration: "Nigerarenu Yami" (Japanese: 逃げられぬ闇)	Hironobu Aoyagi	Hiroshi Seko	May 12, 2016	
Ikoma helps the bushi develop weapons to kill the Kabane and Ayame declares the Kabaneri are the bodyguards of the Kōtetsujō. The train arrives at Yashiro Station which was attacked by Kabane who still remain within. The Aragane passengers rescue some human survivors, who talk of a Black Fog before the attack. Mumei meets Enoku, a crippled fighter still loyal to her brother the Young Master. He warns her that the shogunate is acting suspiciously by stockpiling weapons and advises her to complete her mission. Debris blocks the tracks and the Kōtetsujō committee decide to use a crane to remove it. Ikoma suggest a cautious route to the crane, but Mumei unexpectedly insists on a head-on clash with the Kabane. While Ikoma leads a group of engineers to start the crane, Mumei attacks the nest of Kabane single handed, estimating that she has 90 seconds of energy left. She defeats them, but before the working party can start the crane, even more Kabane appear. The crew retreat and Ikoma starts to lift the debris with the crane while Mumei uses her remaining energy to fight the horde of Kabane. A weakening Mumei is then attacked by a Wazatori and Ikoma goes to her aid before he completes removing the debris, getting them both into a nearby tunnel. At that moment, a giant shadowy figure heads towards the train.
6	"Gathering Light"; Transliteration: "Tsudou Hikari" (Japanese: 集う光)	Yasuhiro Akamatsu	Hiroshi Seko	May 19, 2016	
The Black Fog is revealed to be a colony of Kabane fused into one giant beast. Unable to leave, the Kōtetsujō retreats to the station workshop and they seal the door. Ikoma finds Mumei trapped under rubble and tries to release her. The committee discuss their options of whether to leave or stay. Unable to free Mumei, Ikoma leads the Kabane away from her and kills as many as he can before succumbing. Kurusu and some others rescue Mumei, and she runs to find Ikoma who is badly wounded, and they all return to the train together. While the Black Fog is distracted feeding on the dead Kabane underground, Ikoma removes the wreckage from the tracks. Mumei, having some knowledge about the beast, suggests a plan to kill it using everyone working together. The Kōtetsujō leaves for the station exit with the beast in pursuit, and at the last possible moment they shoot it with a cannon they found and had installed on the train, and Mumei kills the woman controlling it who, much to her surprise, was a Kabaneri like her who turned rogue. With the beast defeated, the Kōtetsujō leaves Yashiro Station.
7	"Begging The Heavens"; Transliteration: "Ten ni Negau" (Japanese: 天に願う)	Fumihiro Ueno; Nobuyoshi Nagayama	Ichirō Ōkouchi	May 26, 2016	
The Kōtetsujō arrives at Shitori Station, which is still occupied by humans, but are only allowed to stay for a couple of days. Ayame exchanges something of value to purchase bamboo for the Tanabata ceremony so people can hang their wishes on it. They are then offered food and other provisions in exchange for the jet bullets technology invented by Ikoma. Mumei reveals to Ikoma that her name was Hozumi before she became a Kabaneri, and he promises that he will make her human again. The next day they all share their wishes, hoping for a better life. The following day the hayajiro Kokujou arrives with the Hunter squad. It is an elite team that hunts Kabane, led by Biba, the shōgun's son, who Mumei calls her brother. However, Ikoma is suspicious of Biba's past and whether he is really a hero, or something else.
8	"The Silent Hunter"; Transliteration: "Mokusu Karibito" (Japanese: 黙す狩人)	Hiroyuki Tanaka; Hitomi Ezoe; Kunihiro Mori	Ichirō Ōkouchi	June 2, 2016	
Biba Amatori is introduced to Ayame and reveals that he is Mumei's 'older brother' in name only and has been disowned by the shōgun. The Kabane attack Shitori Station and Biba takes his Hunter squad and destroys them all, and kills a re-emerged Enoku, who he accuses of betrayal. He then offers to accompany Ayane's group to Kongokaku and she accepts, and so, after being coupled, the Kōtetsujō and Kokujou depart. Ikoma suspects that Biba turned Mumei into a Kabaneri and gave her the name Mumei for his own purposes. Biba asks Mumei to get the Kōtetsujō master key for him, but she is tricked and given the wrong key. Ikoma discovers that Biba is transporting Kabane on his train, but Biba uses Mumei to prevent him from entering the carriage. Ikoma is convinced that Biba is not a hero.
9	"Fang of Ruin"; Transliteration: "Horobi no Kiba" (Japanese: 滅びの牙)	Hironobu Aoyagi; Hiroyuki Tanaka; Tetsuaki Watanabe	Ichirō Ōkouchi	June 9, 2016	
The Kokujou with the Hunters is refused entry to Iwato Station, the last before Kongokaku, by the shōgun's samurai. Ayame decides to part company with the Hunters and asks Ikoma to get Mumei. Lord Maeda, leader of the fortress agrees to a meeting with Biba on the condition that only women and children accompany him. During the meeting, Mumei leaves the meeting saying that she needs to go to the toilet and lowers the Iwato Station's drawbridge to let Biba's Kabane into the station. Biba then kills Lord Maeda. When Mumei sees the Kabane attack the station she is horrified by the consequences of her actions. Meanwhile, Biba's men take Ayame hostage and kill the shōgun's samurai for what Biba says is retribution for the shogunate's cowardice for the past 10 years. He believes that only the strong should survive. Biba injects his Kabaneri Horobi with a serum so that she can become the heart of another Black Fog beast, gathering all the Kabane into a single colony, a Nue. The Nue is defeated, but Horobi survives and continues to fight. When she reaches Biba, he kills her since she has served her purpose. In the aftermath, Biba and his men control a devastated Iwato Station. Mumei then realizes that everything Biba had told her was a lie.
10	"The Attacking Weak"; Transliteration: "Semeagu Jakusha" (Japanese: 攻め上ぐ弱者)	Hiroyuki Tanaka; Tokiyoshi Sasaki; Yasuhiro Akamatsu	Hiroshi Seko	June 16, 2016	
Biba and his troops are now in control of the hayajiro and its passengers, using their blood to feed his Kabane. Biba offers a deal to Ayame that if she can open the gates to Kongokaku, and arrange a meeting with his father, he will guarantee the safety of her people. He tells her of the time when his father sent him with 400,000 troops to Kyushu to fight the Kabane, but when replacement supplies failed to arrive, they were overrun and wiped out, for which he blames his father. Meanwhile, Ikoma hatches a daring plan with some of the passengers to retake control of the hayajiro. Biba offers Mumei a chance to join his troops, but she refuses and is forced to take captive vaccine and sedated. Ikoma's group starts their attack to take control of the Kōtetsujō, but Biba had anticipated a counterattack and confronts Ikoma, killing Takumi who sacrifices himself to save Ikoma. Biba then calls on Mumei to kill Ikoma. She obeys his order due to Biba's captive vaccine, stabbing Ikoma who falls from the hayajiro into a coast far below.
11	"Burning Life"; Transliteration: "Moeru Inochi" (Japanese: 燃える命)	Hiroyuki Tanaka; Hitomi Ezoe; Kunihiro Mori	Ichirō Ōkouchi	June 23, 2016	
Ikoma is still alive, washed up on the shore and is found by Kurusu (who went missing in the previous attack). Biba injects Mumei with the same liquid that he used on Horobi to turn her into a Nue. The Kōtetsujō arrives at Kongokaku and announces that they have captured the men who destroyed Iwato Station, so they are allowed entry. Ayame pretends to have Biba prisoner because her crew are being held hostage, and they are taken to meet the shōgun. Biba tricks the shōgun into holding a sword tainted with the Kabane virus which turns him into a Kabane. Biba then kills him and announces to everyone that Kabane are among them, which creates a panic and people start killing each other out of fear. The Karikatashu take the Kōtetsujō into the city and release the Kabane, while Ayame escapes with the help of her uncle. Kurusu has one of Biba's scientists prisoner with knowledge about the Kabane virus. He says that Mumei can be saved once she becomes a Nue by injecting white plasma into her heart. Ikoma insists on being injected by black plasma to give him additional strength, although it will accelerate the Kabane virus and shorten his life. Mumei begins her transformation into a Nue to fulfill Biba's dream of destruction.
12	"Iron Fortress"; Transliteration: "Kōtetsujō" (Japanese: 甲鉄城)	Hironobu Aoyagi; Hiroyuki Tanaka; Takayuki Hirao; Tetsurō Araki	Ichirō Ōkouchi	June 30, 2016	
Ikoma and Kurusu enter Kongokaku, drawing the Kabane towards them. Ayame appeals to the humans to stop attacking each other in fear and entreats them to leave Kongokaku with her people in the Kōtetsujō. With Kurusu's help, Ikoma is able to reach the Mumei Nue. He destroys the hayajiro Kokujou in the process when the Hunters try to drive it into him with his additional powers since taking the black serum. Mumei seems to be unaware of what she's become, recalling memories from the past and imagining herself surrounded by butterflies. Ikoma reaches the Mumei Nue but is intercepted by Biba who is revealed as a Kabaneri. Biba stabs Ikoma with his sword, but this does not kill him, and as he is about to try again, Ikoma recovers and blasts him with his bolt gun. Mumei appears to understand that Ikoma is near, and she allows him to inject her with the white serum, destroying the Nue and returning her to her previous form. Ayame and her people leave the smouldering city of Kongokaku in the hayajiro Kōtetsujō with Kurusu, Mumei and an injured Ikoma on board. Ikoma starts to recover thanks to a serum secretly given by Biba and the effects of the black serum seem to diminish. As an afterthought, Mumei hands him back his green stone.

=== Films ===
Three feature-length anime theatrical films were released between 2016 and 2019. The first two films, which are recaps of the first and second halves of the TV series, premiered in Japanese theaters on December 31, 2016, and January 7, 2017. The third film, titled Kabaneri of the Iron Fortress: The Battle of Unato, takes place six months after the events of the TV series and revolves around the Battle of Unato. It premiered on May 10, 2019. The Battle of Unato was streamed internationally on September 13, 2019, as a Netflix original consisting of three episodes.

No.	Title	Directed by	Written by	Original release date
1	"Koutetsujou no Kabaneri Movie 1: Gathering Light"; Transliteration: "Kō tetsu-jō no kabaneri sōshūhen {zenpen} tsudou hikari" (Japanese: 甲鉄城のカバネリ 総集編｛前編｝集う光)	Tetsurō Araki	Ichirō Ōkouchi	December 31, 2016
Recap of episodes 1 to 6.
2	"Koutetsujou no Kabaneri Movie 2: Burning Life"; Transliteration: "Kō tetsu-jō no kabaneri sōshūhen {kōhen} moeruinochi" (Japanese: 甲鉄城のカバネリ 総集編｛後編｝燃える命)	Tetsurō Araki	Ichirō Ōkouchi	January 7, 2017
Recap of episodes 7 to 12.
3	"Koutetsujou no Kabaneri Movie 3: The Battle of Unato"; Transliteration: "Kō tetsu-jō no kabaneri ~ Kaimon kessen ~" (Japanese: 甲鉄城のカバネリ～海門決戦～)	Tetsurō Araki	Tetsurō Araki	May 10, 2019
Episode 1 The story begins with a retelling of the TV Series focusing on events leading to the Kōtetsujō travelling to the town of Unato. The town is dominated by a hilltop castle which has become a nest of kabane and threatens the population. Ayame and Kurusu with Ikoma hold a meeting with Kuroji of the Federal Forces, General Mogari of the Echigo-Tora-Ohuki and Unmo representing the Unato population. Kuroji plans to use the Narukami, an armored hayajiro with giant cannon mounted on board, to blast the castle while Mogari's men and 200 Unato fighters led by Unmo lead a ground assault. However, Ikoma believes that the Kabane in the castle are being controlled in some way and wants to investigate the castle area first. Episode 2 Ikoma prepares to investigate the Unato Kabane, but he has trouble controlling his blood lust and attacks Mumei, so he is arrested. Unmo reveals that there are tunnels under the castle made by Kageyuki Komai, the former owner of the castle. They decide to investigate with Sukari and Mumei and find a separate entrance, apparently used by the Kabane. Meanwhile, the Narukami reaches the main route to Unato early so Kuroji decides to begin the assault on the castle immediately. Hearing the commotion, Ikoma breaks free from his chains and tries to find Mumei. Meanwhile, Unmo's group are suddenly attacked by Kabane who emerge from the tunnel and attack them, overwhelming the Federal soldiers. Mumei immediately heads into the tunnel, but she finds a series of traps and then encounters a powerful and fast Kazatori. Kuroji orders the cannon to begin firing, but Kageyuki who is now a Kabaneri, fires bullets filled with blood at the cannon, attracting hordes of Kabane who engulf the Narukami. When Kuroji orders the cannon fired again, it explodes, destroying itself and the Kabane who overrun the train, killing all the troops, including Kuroji. In the tunnel, Mumei is wounded and cornered by the kazatori, but at the last minute, Ikoma arrives and kills it. Episode 3 Ikoma saves Mumei and as they embrace, they mysteriously find themselves bathed in a green light and are revived. They are joined by Sukari's crew and advance along the tunnel. Meanwhile, Ayame and Kurusu, assisted by Mogari and his men drive the Kōtetsujō upwards toward the castle. Ikoma's group are fired on by Kageyuki and they see a child encased in a blue light in the Kabane nest. Unmo then tells the group how after Kageyuki became a Kabaneri, his daughter Miyuki was killed trying to save him, so he bit her to make her a Kabane and she has since become the core of a "Black Fog". They realize that they must stop Kageyuki before Unato is completely destroyed. Mumei attacks him, but during the fight, Unmo vainly sacrifices himself to stop Kageyuki giving Mumei renewed conviction, and she fatally shoots Kageyuki. This releases Miyuki who transforms into a Black Fog, emerging from the mountain, cutting a destructive path towards Unato. Ayame orders the Kōtetsujō to leave after Ikoma and Sukari's group return, but the Black Fog catches the train. Desperately, Yukina drives the train at full speed into a dead-end tunnel and fire the train's cannon at the same time, destroying and dissipating the monster. As snow begins to fall, the Kōtetsujō leaves Unato, and the key players share some tender moments together.

=== Other ===
A manga adaptation, illustrated by Shirō Yoshida, was serialized in Mag Garden's Monthly Comic Garden magazine from May 2, 2016, to November 5, 2018. Mag Garden released four tankōbon volumes from December 10, 2016, and December 10, 2018.

A mobile game developed by TriFort, Inc. and published by DMM Games titled Kōtetsujō no Kabaneri -Ran- Hajimaru Michiato (甲鉄城のカバネリ -乱-; lit. 'Kabaneri of the Iron Fortress -Revolt- Beginning Tracks') was released on December 19, 2018, for Android and iOS, featuring an animated opening sequence by Wit Studio.

== Music ==
Kabaneri of the Iron Fortress Original Soundtrack

Soundtrack album by Hiroyuki Sawano
- Released: May 18, 2016
- Genre: Soundtrack
- Length: 1:17:45
- Label: Aniplex
- Producers: Hiroyuki Sawano; Yasushi Horiguchi (co-producer)

Hiroyuki Sawano soundtrack albums chronology
Seraph of the End: Battle in Nagoya Original Soundtrack (2016)	Kabaneri of the Iron Fortress Original Soundtrack (2016)	Thunderbolt Fantasy Touriken Yuuki: Original Soundtrack (2016)

Singles from Kabaneri of the Iron Fortress: Original Soundtrack
- 1. "KABANERIOFTHEIRONFORTRESS" Released: October 8, 2016; 2. "Warcry" Released: October 8, 2016

The soundtrack was composed by Hiroyuki Sawano and was released by Aniplex on May 18, 2016. The opening theme is "Kabaneri of the Iron Fortress" by Egoist and the ending theme is "Ninelie" by Aimer with Chelly. For episode 11, the ending theme is "Through My Blood <AM>" by Aimer.

=== Track listing ===
All music composed by Hiroyuki Sawano.

Kabaneri of the Iron Fortress Original Soundtrack
No.	Title	Lyrics	Vocals	Length
1.	"KABANERIOFTHEIRONFORTRESS"	cAnON.	Eliana	5:18
2.	"Warcry"	Benjamin; mpi	mpi	4:14
3.	"KGK"			5:23
4.	"JAnoPAN"		mpi	4:35
5.	"Through My Blood"	cAnON.	Mika Kobayashi	4:14
6.	"noname"			4:39
7.	"88城"			4:35
8.	"VIVALABIBA"			4:00
9.	"ComeBack音"			7:15
10.	"Next of Kin"	Benjamin; mpi	Benjamin	3:27
11.	"araganeekiNo@8女"			4:38
12.	"克JOU気MACHINE甲"			6:57
13.	"Grenzlinie" ("Borderline")	Rie	Cyua	4:56
14.	"Ktetsu上-abdli"			3:38
15.	"1coma"		Mika Kobayashi	5:33
16.	"icon"	cAnON.	Eliana	4:23
Total length:				1:17:45

== Reception ==
The series won the 2016 Newtype Anime Awards for Best TV Anime, Best Soundtrack, Best Character Design, Best Screenplay and Best Studio. At the Crunchyroll's inaugural Anime Awards, it was nominated for nine categories including Anime of the Year.
