= Setsuo Itō =

Japanese voice actor

- 伊藤 節生
- Born: March 18, 1991 (age 35); Hokkaido, Japan
- Occupation: Voice actor
- Years active: 2013-present
- Agent: Air Agency
- Notable credit: Mob Psycho 100 as Mob

Setsuo Itō (伊藤 節生, Itō Setsuo; born March 18, 1991) is a Japanese voice actor from Hokkaido, Japan. He won the Best New Actor Award at the 11th Seiyu Awards. He is affiliated with Air Agency.

== Filmography ==
=== TV Anime ===
- Maji de Otaku na English! Ribbon-chan the TV (2013), Participant A
- Pupipō! (2013), Ryōhei Ameyama
- Days (2016), Minami
- Mob Psycho 100 (2016), Shigeo Kageyama / Mob
- Anime-Gataris (2017), Kai Musashisakai
- Mob Psycho 100 II (2019), Shigeo Kageyama / Mob
- Mob Psycho 100 III (2022), Shigeo Kageyama / Mob
- The Brilliant Healer's New Life in the Shadows (2025), Cress
- Welcome to Demon School! Iruma-kun (2026), Purson Soi
- The Elusive Samurai (2026), Hachirō Miura

=== Original net animation (ONA) ===
- Time Patrol Bon (2024), Yanagisawa

=== Video games ===
- Nostalgia (2014), Regulus
- Macross Delta Scramble (2016), Dominique Udetto
- Crash Bandicoot 4: It's About Time (2020), Lani-Loli

=== Dubbing ===
- Dragon Nest: Warriors' Dawn, Lambert

=== Stage Plays ===
- Mob Psycho 100 (2018), Shigeo Kageyama / Mob
- Mob Psycho 100 (2019), Shigeo Kageyama / Mob
- Mob Psycho 100 (2022), Shigeo Kageyama / Mob
