= Mob Psycho 100 =

Japanese manga series and franchise

- First tankōbon volume cover, featuring Shigeo Kageyama

モブサイコ100 (Mobu Saiko Hyaku)
- Genre: Action; Comedy; Supernatural
- Manga
- Written by: One
- Published by: Shogakukan
- English publisher: NA: Dark Horse Comics
- Imprint: Ura Sunday Comics
- Magazine: Ura Sunday; MangaONE
- Original run: April 18, 2012 – December 22, 2017
- Volumes: 16
- Anime television series
- Directed by: Yuzuru Tachikawa (Note: Credited as Chief Director (総監督) for episodes 26–37); Takahiro Hasui (III)
- Produced by: Akio Matsuda; Hirotsugu Ogisu; Yūki Nagano (I); Jun Fukuda (I); Yukihiro Itō (I); Sōji Miyagi (II); Shūhō Kōndō (II–III); Masahiko Minami (II–III); Shinji Ōmori (II–III); Fumihiro Ozawa (III); Yūsuke Ueno (III)
- Written by: Hiroshi Seko
- Music by: Kenji Kawai
- Studio: Bones
- Licensed by: Crunchyroll; SEA: Muse Communication
- Original network: Tokyo MX, ytv, BS Fuji, TV Asahi Channel 1
- English network: SEA: Animax Asia (S1 & S2); US: Adult Swim (Toonami) (Note: Season 1 only)
- Original run: July 12, 2016 – December 22, 2022
- Episodes: 37 + 2 OVAs
- Television drama
- Directed by: Kōichi Sakamoto
- Produced by: Fuminori Kobayashi
- Written by: Reiko Yoshida; Kei Kunii
- Music by: Go Sakabe
- Studio: TV Tokyo
- Licensed by: Netflix
- Original network: TV Tokyo, BS Japan, TV Wakayama, ABA
- Original run: January 18, 2018 – April 5, 2018
- Episodes: 12
- Manga

Reigen
- Written by: One
- Published by: Shogakukan
- English publisher: NA: Dark Horse Comics
- Imprint: Ura Sunday Comics
- Magazine: Ura Sunday; MangaONE
- Original run: March 19, 2018 – February 19, 2019
- Volumes: 1
- icon

Mob Psycho 100 (Japanese: モブサイコ100, Hepburn: Mobu Saiko Hyaku) is a Japanese web manga series written and illustrated by One. It was serialized on Shogakukan's Ura Sunday website from April 2012 to December 2017. It has also been available online on Shogakukan's mobile app MangaONE since December 2014. Shogakukan compiled its chapters in 16 tankōbon volumes. The story follows Shigeo Kageyama, nicknamed Mob, an introverted 14-year old boy with immense psychic powers who struggles to control his emotions and be understood by others.

An anime television series adaptation was produced by Bones. The first season aired between July and September 2016, followed by a second season from January to April 2019, and a third and final season from October to December 2022. A live-action series adaptation aired from January to April 2018. A spin-off manga series, titled Reigen, was serialized in Shogakukan's MangaONE app in 2018.

In North America, Dark Horse Comics licensed the manga for English publication in 2018. Meanwhile, Crunchyroll licensed the anime series for streaming, with an English dub produced by Bang Zoom! Entertainment in December 2016, and broadcast the first season on Adult Swim's Toonami programming block from October 2018 to February 2019.

By December 2022, the manga had over 2.8 million copies in circulation. In 2017, Mob Psycho 100 won the 62nd Shogakukan Manga Award in the shōnen category. The anime adaptation received critical acclaim and is considered one of the best anime series of the 2010s.

== Plot ==
Shigeo Kageyama is an average middle school boy, nicknamed Mob. (Note: Mob (モブ, Mobu; wasei eigo for "background character") for lacking a sense of presence. Furthermore, the characters of his first name (茂夫), when read with Chinese-derived on'yomi instead of the standard kun'yomi, is "Mobu".) Although he looks inconspicuous, he is in fact a powerful esper with immense psychic power. To keep from losing control of this power, he consistently represses his emotions, and as a result has trouble expressing himself. In order to help learn how to control his abilities, Mob works as an assistant to well-meaning con-man Arataka Reigen, a self-proclaimed spirit medium. Mob wants to live a normal life just like those around him, but a barrage of trouble keeps coming after him. With his suppressed emotions growing inside Mob little by little, his power threatens to break through its limits as he deals with supernatural threats, such as ghosts and other espers.

== Media ==
=== Webcomic and publications ===
Written and illustrated by One, Mob Psycho 100 began in Shogakukan's Ura Sunday website on April 18, 2012. It has been also available on Shogakukan's mobile app MangaONE since December 2014. The series finished on December 22, 2017. Shogakukan collected its chapters in 16 tankōbon volumes, released from November 16, 2012, to July 19, 2018.

Dark Horse Comics announced on April 23, 2018, that it had licensed the series for English serialization in North America. The 16 volumes were released from October 24, 2018, to May 5, 2026.

A spin-off manga series titled Reigen was serialized online in Ura Sunday website and in the MangaONE mobile app starting on March 19, 2018. Shogakukan released a compiled volume on February 19, 2019. In March 2020, Dark Horse Comics announced the acquisition of the manga for English-language release. The volume was published on December 2, 2020.

==== Volumes ====
| No. | Original release date | Original ISBN | English release date | English ISBN |
|---|---|---|---|---|
| 1 | November 16, 2012 | 978-4-09-124102-3 | October 24, 2018 | 978-1-5067-0987-1 |
| 2 | February 18, 2013 | 978-4-09-124252-5 | March 20, 2019 | 978-1-5067-0988-8 |
| 3 | June 18, 2013 | 978-4-09-124338-6 | July 31, 2019 | 978-1-5067-0989-5 |
| 4 | July 18, 2013 | 978-4-09-124397-3 | March 18, 2020 | 978-1-5067-1369-4 |
| 5 | December 18, 2013 | 978-4-09-124543-4 | June 24, 2020 | 978-1-5067-1370-0 |
| 6 | May 16, 2014 | 978-4-09-124682-0 | October 14, 2020 | 978-1-5067-1371-7 |
| 7 | July 18, 2014 | 978-4-09-125129-9 | October 27, 2021 | 978-1-5067-2759-2 |
| 8 | October 17, 2014 | 978-4-09-125476-4 | May 4, 2022 | 978-1-5067-2760-8 |
| 9 | February 12, 2015 | 978-4-09-125748-2 | August 17, 2022 | 978-1-5067-2761-5 |
| 10 | August 4, 2015 | 978-4-09-126328-5 | February 8, 2023 | 978-1-5067-3072-1 |
| 11 | December 4, 2015 | 978-4-09-126676-7 | May 3, 2023 | 978-1-5067-3073-8 |
| 12 | June 17, 2016 | 978-4-09-127310-9 | September 6, 2023 | 978-1-5067-3074-5 |
| 13 | August 19, 2016 | 978-4-09-127373-4 | January 24, 2024 | 978-1-5067-3798-0 |
| 14 | April 19, 2017 | 978-4-09-127592-9 | September 24, 2024 | 978-1-5067-3799-7 |
| 15 | October 19, 2017 | 978-4-09-127819-7 | October 7, 2025 | 978-1-5067-3800-0 |
| 16 | July 19, 2018 | 978-4-09-128460-0 | May 5, 2026 | 978-1-5067-3801-7 |
| Reigen | February 19, 2019 | 978-4-09-128767-0 | December 2, 2020 | 978-1-5067-2072-2 |

=== Anime ===
On December 2, 2015, Ura Sunday announced that Mob Psycho 100 would be adapted into an anime television series. The anime adaptation was produced by Bones and directed by Yuzuru Tachikawa. Hiroshi Seko wrote the scripts, Yoshimichi Kameda designed the characters, and Kenji Kawai composed the music. The series aired for 12 episodes between July 12 and September 27, 2016, on Tokyo MX, later airing on ytv, BS Fuji and TV Asahi Channel 1. (Note: Tokyo MX listed the series premiere date on July 11 at 24:00, effectively July 12 at midnight JST.) The opening theme song, "99", is performed by Mob Choir while the ending theme song, titled "Refrain Boy" (リフレインボーイ, Rifurein Bōi), is performed by All Off.

Following a screening of three Bones films, attendees reported that Bones teased that progress was being made on a further Mob Psycho 100 anime project. In October 2017, an event anime, titled Mob Psycho 100 Reigen The Miraculous Unknown Psychic (モブサイコ100 REIGEN ～知られざる奇跡の霊能力者～, Mobu Saiko Hyaku Reigen Shirarezaru Kiseki Reinōryokusha), was revealed. It is a 60-minute compilation of the anime series and features new scenes focused on Arataka Reigen. It was screened twice at the Maihama Amphitheater in Chiba on March 18, 2018, and was later released on home video.

At the end of the event, the second season of the anime series was announced, with the staff and voice cast returning to reprise their roles. Mob Psycho 100 II aired for 13 episodes from January 7 to April 1, 2019. The opening theme for the second season is "99.9" by Mob Choir feat. Sajou no Hana. Four ending themes performed by Sajou no Hana; "Gray" (グレイ, Gurei), "Memosepia" (メモセピア), "Mabuta no Ura" (目蓋の裏; lit. 'Under the Eyelids') and "Ikiru Hitobito" (いきるひとびと; lit. 'Living People'), were used for the second season.

Following the conclusion of the second season, an original video animation (OVA) was announced, with Tachikawa reprising his role as director. The OVA, titled Mob Psycho 100: The First Spirits and Such Company Trip – A Journey that Mends the Heart and Heals the Soul (モブサイコ100 第一回霊とか相談所慰安旅行~ココロ満たす癒やしの旅~, Mobu Saiko Hyaku Dai Ikkai Rei to ka Sōdansho Ianryokō Kokoro Mitasu Iyashi no Tabi), was released on September 25, 2019.

On October 19, 2021, it was announced that a third season was in production. Takahiro Hasui directed the season, with Tachikawa serving as chief director. The main cast and staff reprised their roles. Mob Psycho 100 III aired from October 6 to December 22, 2022. (Note: Tokyo MX listed the series premiere date on October 5 at 24:00, effectively October 6 at midnight JST.) The opening theme is "1", and the ending theme is "Cobalt", both performed by Mob Choir.

An anime short was presented at the "Mob Psycho 100 Anime 10th Anniversary Event: Reunion" at the Fukagawa Mirai Hall in Kawaguchi City, Saitama, on July 13, 2026. Tachikawa served as the director, writer, storyboarder, and technical director for the short, with Kameda serving as the animation director. The short was released on the Warner Bros. Japan Anime YouTube channel with English subtitles.

==== English release ====
Mob Psycho 100 was simulcast on Crunchyroll, while Funimation broadcast the show's simuldub. Crunchyroll also streamed the second and third seasons, as well as the compilation and the OVA. The English dub was produced by Bang Zoom! Entertainment. The first season was broadcast on Adult Swim's Toonami programming block from October 27, 2018, to February 3, 2019. According to Jason DeMarco, Adult Swim executive producer, legal issues arose with the licensing of the second season at the time, as the Japanese version was licensed by Crunchyroll, and the English version was licensed by Funimation, and it prevented the second season from the airing on the block. At the time of the legal incident, both companies were not owned by a single conglomerate company. The third season would also not air on the block, mainly due in part to Crunchyroll's "unwillingness" to work with Adult Swim on syndication deals for most of their licensed catalog. Madman Entertainment imported Funimation's release in Australia and New Zealand, and Manga Entertainment distributed the series in the United Kingdom and Ireland. The series was simulcast on Animax Asia in Southeast Asia; Muse Communication later licensed the series in the territory.

The third season's simuldub was slated to be produced by Crunchyroll rather than Bang Zoom! with some roles recast, due to the choice to move dub production to in-person recording sessions at their Dallas based studio, rather than remote recordings, after largely relying on the latter at the start of the COVID-19 pandemic. Among the planned recastings was the voice of Mob, Kyle McCarley, who stated that he would likely not be reprising the role as Crunchyroll had refused to negotiate a potential union contract for future anime dubbing productions with McCarley's union SAG-AFTRA. McCarley had offered to work non-union on season 3 under the condition that Crunchyroll discuss with SAG-AFTRA, but as this did not proceed, McCarley did not return. This news prompted much criticism of Crunchyroll on social media.

=== Live-action drama ===
A 12-episode Japanese television drama premiered on Netflix on January 12, 2018, and was broadcast on TV Tokyo's MokuDora 25 timeslot from January 18 to April 5 of that same year.

=== Stage plays ===
A stage play adaptation of the manga was announced in October 2017. It ran in Tokyo from January 6–14, 2018 at The Galaxy Theatre. The play is directed and written by Keita Kawajiri, while Setsuo Itō reprised his role as Shigeo "Mob" Kageyama from the anime. The other cast includes Ryōma Baba as Arataka Reigen, Takeshi Nadagi as Dimple, Takuya Kawaharada as Teruki Hanazawa, and Gaku Matsumoto as Ritsu Kageyama.

A second stage play adaptation was announced in June 2018, with the cast and staff returning to reprise their roles. It ran in Tokyo from September 13–17 at The Galaxy Theatre, and in Hyōgo from September 20–23, 2018 at Shinkobe Oriental Theater. Shoichiro Oomi and Kentarou Kanesaki replacing Yūya Kido and Naoya Gomoto as Tenga Onigawara and Musashi Gōda respectively, while Seiichirō Nagata joined the cast as Shō.

A third stage play adaptation, titled Mob Psycho 100 (Crash! Tsume's 7th Branch) (モブサイコ100 〜激突！ 爪 台ー7 支部〜, Mob Psycho 100 ~Gekitotsu! Tsume Dai-7 Shibu~), ran in Tokyo's Hulic Hall from August 6–15, 2021, with the cast and staff reprise their roles from the previous stage plays.

=== Drama CD ===
A drama CD, titled "Psychic Human Show", was released on January 25, 2017. This CD includes 15 tracks written by creator One and director Yuzuru Tachikawa. It includes humorous skits, character songs, and talking songs. The jacket illustration was drawn by the anime series character designer and animator Yoshimichi Kameda.

| No. | Title | Length |
|---|---|---|
| 1. | "Opening" | 2:15 |
| 2. | "A March Through the Snow" | 4:14 |
| 3. | "Nikukai Fai~! Body Improvement Club Song~!" | 3:43 |
| 4. | "Overeating" | 4:42 |
| 5. | "A World Seen For the First Time" | 6:40 |
| 6. | "How to Use Your Power" | 3:41 |
| 7. | "Telepathy Life" | 4:54 |
| 8. | "Telepathy Fairy-tale" | 3:37 |
| 9. | "Body Improvement Club's 3 Minute Cooking" | 3:48 |
| 10. | "Interview" | 2:32 |
| 11. | "Hobby" | 2:56 |
| 12. | "Body Improvement Club's 3 Minute Cooking 2" | 2:15 |
| 13. | "Ghosts and Such Phone Consultation" | 3:49 |
| 14. | "Ending" | 1:32 |
| 15. | "Story of a Dream" | 3:22 |
| Total length: | | 54:00 |

=== Other media ===
A fanbook was published on November 17, 2022. It includes detailed information about the series, its characters, story and setting. It also features illustrations by various manga artists, including Hiromu Arakawa, Kotoyama, Takako Shimura, Nagano, Ryōji Minagawa and Itaru Bonnoki.

== Reception ==
=== Manga ===
By July 2016, Mob Psycho 100 had over 1.2 million copies in circulation. By December 2022, the manga had over 2.8 million copies in circulation.

The comic book writers of San Diego Comic-Con listed Mob Psycho 100 as one of the "Most Wanted Manga" from 2016. Mob Psycho 100 won the 62nd Shogakukan Manga Award in the shōnen category in 2017. The series was nominated for a Harvey Award in the Best Manga category in 2019.

==== Critical reception ====
Ian Wolf from Anime UK News praised the first two volumes of the series, giving them 8 out of 10, and stated "One's art is notable for a few reasons. The art is designed to be humorous rather than stylish. Part of the comedy value in One's work is the rough styling that adds to the scenarios he creates. In this second volume of Mob Psycho 100, it is the action which is the main focus. There is some comedy thrown into the mix as well, but mainly this time it is about the battle between the two psychics and their different philosophies. It is also interesting to witness this fight because it is one in which one of the participants is trying their hardest not to fight, while the other is giving it all they've got. Having said this, there is still some comedy added to the heat of the battle, the main highlight being when Teru tries to use knives to beat Mob, but Mob deflects one of the knives away, accidentally cutting off a massive chunk of Teru's hair. It is at times like this where One's art style can sometimes fall down. His rough artwork does lead neatly to the chaotic scenes he is trying to depict at the height of the fight but when it comes to the more dramatic moments, the rough style lacks pathos. Here, the anime has the edge when it depicts the fight because other elements such as the music or the use of colour can add to the tension".

=== Anime ===
In the Crunchyroll's inaugural Anime Awards, the first season of the anime series received two awards: Best Action and Best Fight Scene (Shigeo vs. Koyama). It was also nominated in six other categories, including "Anime of the Year". At the 4th Crunchyroll Anime Awards in 2020, the second season of the anime also won two awards: Best Animation and Best Opening Sequence for "99.9" by Mob Choir feat. Sajou no Hana. It was also nominated in five other categories, including "Anime of the Year". Mob Psycho 100 was one of the Jury Recommended Works in the Animation Division at the 20th Japan Media Arts Festival in 2017. In November 2019, Polygon named Mob Psycho 100 as one of the best anime of the 2010s, and Crunchyroll listed it in their "Top 25 best anime of the 2010s". IGN also listed Mob Psycho 100 among the best anime series of the 2010s.

On Tumblr's 2019 Year in Review, which highlights the largest communities, fandoms, and trends on the platform throughout the year, Mob Psycho 100 ranked second behind My Hero Academia on the Top Anime & Manga Shows while Arataka Reigen was fifth on the Top Anime & Manga Characters category. In September 2020, the series went viral after American businessman Eric Trump, son of President Donald Trump, published a tweet connecting the series to allegations of censorship by Google, due to Google Search results for "mob" showing Mob's face rather than a group of people.

==== Critical reception ====
Anime News Network listed the first season of Mob Psycho 100 among the best anime series of 2016. Nick Creamer praised the series' visual style, character story and its concepts of heroism and society also presented in ONE's other work One-Punch Man. Lauren Orsini commended the coming-of-age story of Mob and praised the series' animation and music. James Beckett of Anime News Network gave the second season an A+, and describes the series as "I don't know how else to put it: Mob Psycho 100 II is about as close to perfect a season of television as I can imagine. I am willing to bet that the series will go down as one of the best seasons of anime ever produced, and you owe it to yourself to experience it first-hand. A modern masterpiece of animation that needs to be seen to be believed".

Steve Jones complimented the anime's final episode and said: "While it hurts to say goodbye, it's fitting for Mob Psycho 100 to take a bow with some final flexes of its two strongest muscles: a parting exaltation of simple kindness, and a brilliantly animated display of Reigen getting the everloving crap kicked out of him. There aren't many surprises in this finale (maybe one big one, depending on how gullible you are), but I like that. This feels like the series going out on its own terms, in an adaptation that has maintained its trailblazing spirit and quality for over six years. This is the farewell Mob deserves." Kirsten Carey of The Mary Sue deemed the series' ending as "emotional", describing that its last arc added an important new message which made her cry, and it's one that had been building quietly throughout the series.

==== Awards and nominations ====
| Year | Award | Category | Recipient | Result | Ref. |
|---|---|---|---|---|---|
| 2017 | IGN Awards | Best Anime Series | Mob Psycho 100 | Nominated | |
| 2017 | IGN Awards | Best Anime Opening | "99" by Mob Choir | Nominated | |
| 2017 | IGN Awards | Best Anime Opening - People's Choice | "99" by Mob Choir | Won | |
| 2017 | 1st Crunchyroll Anime Awards | Anime of the Year | Mob Psycho 100 | Nominated | |
| 2017 | 1st Crunchyroll Anime Awards | Hero of the Year | Shigeo "Mob" Kageyama | Nominated | |
| 2017 | 1st Crunchyroll Anime Awards | Best Boy | Arataka Reigen | Nominated | |
| 2017 | 1st Crunchyroll Anime Awards | Best Animation | Mob Psycho 100 | Nominated | |
| 2017 | 1st Crunchyroll Anime Awards | Best Action | Mob Psycho 100 | Won | |
| 2017 | 1st Crunchyroll Anime Awards | Best Opening | "99" by Mob Choir | Nominated | |
| 2017 | 1st Crunchyroll Anime Awards | Best Ending | "Refrain Boy" by All Off | Nominated | |
| 2017 | 1st Crunchyroll Anime Awards | Best Fight Scene | Shigeo vs. Koyama | Won | |
| 2017 | Japan Expo Awards | Daruma d'Or Anime | Mob Psycho 100 | Nominated | |
| 2017 | Japan Expo Awards | Daruma for Best Simulcast | Mob Psycho 100 | Nominated | |
| 2017 | 24th AnimeLand Grand Prix | Best Anime | Mob Psycho 100 | Won | |
| 2017 | 24th AnimeLand Grand Prix | Best Character | Shigeo "Mob" Kageyama | Won | |
| 2017 | 11th Seiyu Awards | Best Rookie Actor | Setsuo Itō as Shigeo "Mob" Kageyama | Won | |
| 2019 | 41st Anime Grand Prix | Grand Prix | Mob Psycho 100 II | 8th place | |
| 2019 | 41st Anime Grand Prix | Best Theme Song | "99.9" by Mob Choir feat. Sajou no Hana | 9th place | |
| 2019 | 9th Newtype Anime Awards | Best Mascot Character | Dimple | 7th place | |
| 2019 | IGN Awards | Best Anime Series | Mob Psycho 100 II | Won | |
| 2019 | IGN Awards | Best Animation | Mob Psycho 100 II | Won | |
| 2020 | 4th Crunchyroll Anime Awards | Anime of the Year | Mob Psycho 100 II | Nominated | |
| 2020 | 4th Crunchyroll Anime Awards | Best Boy | Shigeo "Mob" Kageyama | Nominated | |
| 2020 | 4th Crunchyroll Anime Awards | Best Director | Yuzuru Tachikawa | Nominated | |
| 2020 | 4th Crunchyroll Anime Awards | Best Animation | Mob Psycho 100 II | Won | |
| 2020 | 4th Crunchyroll Anime Awards | Best Opening Sequence | "99.9" by Mob Choir feat. Sajou no Hana | Won | |
| 2020 | 4th Crunchyroll Anime Awards | Best Fight Scene | Mob vs. Toichiro | Nominated | |
| 2020 | 4th Crunchyroll Anime Awards | Best VA Performance (English) | Kyle McCarley as Shigeo "Mob" Kageyama | Nominated | |
| 2022 | IGN Awards | Best Anime Series | Mob Psycho 100 III | Nominated | |
| 2023 | Tokyo Anime Award Festival | Best Animator | Yoshimichi Kameda | Won | |
| 2023 | Japan Expo Awards | Daruma for Best Anime | Mob Psycho 100 III | Nominated | |
| 2023 | Japan Expo Awards | Daruma for Best Director | Mob Psycho 100 III | Nominated | |
| 2023 | Japan Expo Awards | Daruma for Best Action Anime | Mob Psycho 100 III | Nominated | |
| 2023 | Japan Expo Awards | Daruma for Best Opening | "1" by Mob Choir | Nominated | |
| 2023 | Magnolia Award | Best Animation | Mob Psycho 100 III | Nominated | |
| 2023 | Magnolia Award | Best Storytelling | Mob Psycho 100 III | Nominated | |
| 2023 | 13th Newtype Anime Awards | Best Work (TV) | Mob Psycho 100 III | 9th place | |
| 2023 | 13th Newtype Anime Awards | Best Director | Yuzuru Tachikawa and Takahiro Hasui | 3rd place | |
| 2023 | IGN Awards | Best Anime Series | Mob Psycho 100 III | Runner-up | |
| 2024 | 8th Crunchyroll Anime Awards | Best Main Character | Shigeo "Mob" Kageyama | Nominated | |
| 2024 | 8th Crunchyroll Anime Awards | Best Supporting Character | Arataka Reigen | Nominated | |
| 2024 | 8th Crunchyroll Anime Awards | Best Animation | Mob Psycho 100 III | Nominated | |
| 2024 | 8th Crunchyroll Anime Awards | Best VA Performance (Spanish) | Manuel Campuzano as Arataka Reigen | Nominated | |
| 2024 | 8th Crunchyroll Anime Awards | Best VA Performance (Arabic) | Mohammad Dal'o as Arataka Reigen | Nominated | |
| 2024 | 8th Crunchyroll Anime Awards | Best VA Performance (German) | Pascal Breuer as Arataka Reigen | Nominated | |
| 2024 | 8th Crunchyroll Anime Awards | Best VA Performance (Portuguese) | Vagner Fagundes as Arataka Reigen | Nominated | |
