= Now I'm a Demon Lord! =

Japanese light novel series

- Now I'm a Demon Lord! Happily Ever After with Monster Girls in My Dungeon
- Cover of the first light novel volume

魔王になったので、ダンジョン造って人外娘とほのぼのする (Maō ni Natta no de, Dungeon Tsukutte Jingai Musume to Honobono Suru)
- Genre: Harem; Isekai; Romance
- Novel series
- Written by: Ryūyū
- Published by: Shōsetsuka ni Narō
- Original run: October 1, 2016 – present
- Light novel
- Written by: Ryūyū
- Illustrated by: Daburyu
- Published by: Fujimi Shobo
- English publisher: NA: J-Novel Club
- Imprint: Kadokawa Books
- Original run: November 10, 2017 – present
- Volumes: 17
- Manga
- Written by: Ryūyū
- Illustrated by: Note Tono
- Published by: Fujimi Shobo
- English publisher: NA: J-Novel Club
- Imprint: Dragon Comics Age
- Magazine: Niconico Seiga (Dra Dra Sharp)
- Original run: May 4, 2018 – present
- Volumes: 13

Now I'm a Demon Lord! Happily Ever After with Monster Girls in My Dungeon (魔王になったので、ダンジョン造って人外娘とほのぼのする, Maō ni Natta no de, Dungeon Tsukutte Jingai Musume to Honobono Suru) is a Japanese light novel series written by Ryūyū with illustrations provided by Daburyu.

The first chapter was uploaded in October 2016 on user-generated online platform Shōsetsuka ni Narō and was later acquired by Japanese publisher Fujimi Shobo who published the first printed volume under their Kadokawa Books imprint in November 2017.

The series also received a manga adaptation with illustrations done by Note Tono, which started in May 2018. The manga series is published on Fujimi Shobo's Niconico-based Dra Dra Sharp website and was later released in printed format under their Dragon Comics Age imprint.

Both the light novel and manga series were licensed by American publisher J-Novel Club for an English-language publication. The story of the series follows Yuki, who was suddenly summoned in a fantasy world as a demon lord tied to his own dungeon. In his new role as leader of his own dungeon, he meets different persons and monsters, some of them are friendly towards him while others are not.

== Plot ==
Yuki, who was a human not long ago, has been summoned to a fantasy world as a demon lord. In this new world he is the ruler of his own dungeon. A dungeon is like a living being and Yuki is tied to its core. If Yuki dies, the dungeon vanishes; and Yuki dies if the dungeon is conquered.

At the beginning of his new life, Yuki spends time expanding the dungeon which is possible by using dungeon points. Dungeon points are acquirable by fulfilling different tasks or accepting creatures as his familiar. The world outside of his dungeons seems to be dangerous as monsters are fighting for survival everywhere. One day, Yuki meets a dragon named Lefisios who is eager to kill him. Yuki who finds out that the dragon has a weakness for sweets can stop him from his plans and makes an offer to Lefisios to give him more sweets if he spares his life. The dragon agrees and turns into human form which to Yuki's surprise looks like a young girl.

Yuki and Lefisios spend some days together. He creates weapons and summons his first familiar, a slime monster which he names Shī. One day while on hunt, Yuki finds a wounded vampire girl named Iluna who is chased by slavers and treats her wounds. When Iluna was kidnapped by said slavers some days later, Yuki and Lefisios ilfitrate the headquarters in attempt to rescue their newest family member. They are able to free her from the slavers and return home.

Meanwhile, unbeknownst to his father, prince Lute who is eager to seize the lands of Yuki for its riches, sends the heroine Nell to the territory to get rid of the demon lord. It turns out that Nell is rather clumsy in her acts to kill Yuki. Yuki can convince her that he is not the evil demon the stories tell him to be and they become friends. To get more information about this world, Yuki and Lefisios register as adventurers in the royal city.

== Media ==
=== Light novel ===
Ryūyū published the first chapter of Now I'm a Demon Lord! Happily Ever After with Monster Girls in My Dungeon on the user-generated online platform Shōsetsuka ni Narō on October 1, 2016.

It was later acquired by Japanese publisher Fujimi Shobo who publishes a printed version of the light novel series with illustrations drawn by Daburyu under their Kadokawa Books imprint since November 10, 2017. As of March 2024, seventeen volumes had been published in Japan.

In May 2022, American publisher J-Novel Club announced the acquisition of the light novel series for an English-language release.

| No. | Original release date | Original ISBN | English release date | English ISBN |
|---|---|---|---|---|
| 1 | November 10, 2017 | 978-4-04-072502-4 | August 23, 2022 | 978-1-71-839047-8 |
| 2 | May 10, 2018 | 978-4-04-072504-8 | November 1, 2022 | 978-1-71-839049-2 |
| 3 | September 10, 2018 | 978-4-04-072884-1 | January 17, 2023 | 978-1-71-839051-5 |
| 4 | January 10, 2019 | 978-4-04-073011-0 | April 18, 2023 | 978-1-71-839053-9 |
| 5 | May 10, 2019 | 978-4-04-073173-5 | July 19, 2023 | 978-1-71-839055-3 |
| 6 | September 10, 2019 | 978-4-04-073335-7 | October 16, 2023 | 978-1-71-839057-7 |
| 7 | January 10, 2020 | 978-4-04-073449-1 | December 29, 2023 | 978-1-71-839059-1 |
| 8 | May 9, 2020 | 978-4-04-073643-3 | March 29, 2024 | 978-1-71-839061-4 |
| 9 | September 10, 2020 | 978-4-04-073786-7 | June 14, 2024 | 978-1-71-839063-8 |
| 10 | January 9, 2021 | 978-4-04-073929-8 | September 20, 2024 | 978-1-71-839065-2 |
| 11 | May 8, 2021 | 978-4-04-074080-5 | December 27, 2024 | 978-1-71-839067-6 |
| 12 | November 10, 2021 | 978-4-04-074301-1 | March 28, 2025 | 978-1-71-839069-0 |
| 13 | April 8, 2022 | 978-4-04-074491-9 | November 14, 2025 | 978-1-71-839071-3 |
| 14 | September 9, 2022 | 978-4-04-074661-6 | January 16, 2026 | 978-1-71-839073-7 |
| 15 | March 10, 2023 | 978-4-04-074887-0 | March 24, 2026 | 978-1-71-839075-1 |
| 16 | September 8, 2023 | 978-4-04-075129-0 | July 2, 2026 | 978-1-71-839077-5 |
| 17 | March 8, 2024 | 978-4-04-075350-8 | October 28, 2026 | 978-1-71-839079-9 |

=== Manga ===
A manga adaptation with illustrations by Note Tone started on Fujimi Shobo's Niconico-based Dra Dra Sharp website on May 4, 2018. The first printed volume in tankōbon format was published on January 9, 2019, under their Dragon Comics Age imprint. As of November 2026, thirteen volumes have been published in Japan.

J-Novel Club also acquired the rights for an English-language publication of the manga series in January 2023.

| No. | Original release date | Original ISBN | English release date | English ISBN |
|---|---|---|---|---|
| 1 | January 9, 2019 | 978-4-04-073005-9 | May 10, 2023 | 978-1-71-831380-4 |
| 2 | September 9, 2019 | 978-4-04-073322-7 | August 23, 2024 | 978-1-71-831381-1 |
| 3 | April 9, 2020 | 978-4-04-073620-4 | December 13, 2023 | 978-1-71-831382-8 |
| 4 | December 9, 2020 | 978-4-04-073902-1 | February 21, 2024 | 978-1-71-831383-5 |
| 5 | May 8, 2021 | 978-4-04-074104-8 | April 17, 2024 | 978-1-71-831384-2 |
| 6 | December 9, 2021 | 978-4-04-074348-6 | June 12, 2024 | 978-1-71-831385-9 |
| 7 | September 9, 2022 | 978-4-04-074677-7 | August 21, 2024 | 978-1-71-831386-6 |
| 8 | May 9, 2023 | 978-4-04-074942-6 | October 30, 2024 | 978-1-71-831387-3 |
| 9 | November 9, 2023 | 978-4-04-075201-3 | January 1, 2025 | 978-1-71-831388-0 |
| 10 | July 9, 2024 | 978-4-04-075522-9 | May 14, 2025 | 978-1-71-831389-7 |
| 11 | March 7, 2025 | 978-4-04-075796-4 | January 7, 2026 | 978-1-71-831390-3 |
| 12 | December 9, 2025 | 978-4-04-076195-4 | — | — |
| 13 | November 9, 2026 | 978-4-04-076627-0 | — | — |

=== Other ===
In the second volume of the manga series, it was announced that the series would receive a voice comic adaptation. It was revealed that Yūya Hirose was chosen to voice the protagonist Yuki, while Momoyo Koyama lends her voice to Lefisios.

== Reception ==
The first manga volume was reviewed by Rebecca Silverman, Jean-Karlo Lemus and Christopher Ferris as part of the column The Manga Preview Guide on Anime News Network with all reviews being negative.

The childlike character design of Lefisios and Iluna was criticised negatively, while Yuki not being attracted sexually to them was pointed out positively. The plot was described as a standard fantasy story with characters missing any depth. The translator was praised for the effective usage of modern language in a story setting in a medieval fantasy world while the plot was criticized for not giving any information about Yuki's life before he was summoned as a demon lord.

== See also ==
- The Brilliant Healer's New Life in the Shadows, another light novel series illustrated by Daburyu
