= 1st Crunchyroll Anime Awards =

2017 award ceremony

- Awarded for: Excellence in anime
- Date: January 28, 2017
- Country: United States
- Presented by: Crunchyroll

Highlights
- Most wins: Yuri on Ice (7)
- Most nominations: Kabaneri of the Iron Fortress (9)
- Anime of the Year: Yuri on Ice

The 1st Crunchyroll Anime Awards were held on January 28, 2017, honoring excellence in anime from 2016. The awards were first announced by Crunchyroll in December 2016. The voting period was open from January 3 to 10. The results were announced on January 11 except for the Anime of the Year award, which was announced live on January 28 from the Crunchyroll Anime Awards Party in San Francisco. Crunchyroll reported that 1.8 million votes from around the world were submitted, with the majority of them coming from the United States. It is the only edition that implemented the "Most Popular Other".

== Records ==
Kabaneri of the Iron Fortress dominated the list of nominees, with a total of nine nominations including the Anime of the Year. Mob Psycho 100 followed the lead with eight nominations, including the Anime of the Year. Yuri on Ice won all of its seven nominations, including the inaugural Anime of the Year award.

== Winners and nominees ==
Winners are listed first, highlighted in boldface, and indicated with a double dagger (‡). The lists are arranged alphabetically, except for the winner and the "Most Popular Other".

**Anime of the Year**: **Yuri on Ice — MAPPA**‡; Descending Stories: Showa Genroku Rakugo Shinju — Studio Deen; Erased — A-1 Pictures; Joker Game — Production I.G.; Kabaneri of the Iron Fortress — Wit Studio; Mob Psycho 100 — Bones; My Hero Academia — Bones; Re:Zero − Starting Life in Another World — White Fox	**Hero of the Year**: **Izuku "Deku" Midoriya — My Hero Academia**‡; Shigeo "Mob" Kageyama — Mob Psycho 100; Mumei — Kabaneri of the Iron Fortress; Satoru Fujinuma — Erased; Most Popular "Other": Josuke Higashikata — JoJo's Bizarre Adventure: Diamond Is Unbreakable (season 3)
**Villain of the Year**: **Gaku Yashiro — Erased**‡; Biba — Kabaneri of the Iron Fortress; Tomura Shigaraki — My Hero Academia; Yoshikage Kira — JoJo's Bizarre Adventure: Diamond Is Unbreakable; Most Popular "Other": Betelgeuse (Note: Crunchyroll originally listed him as "Betelgeuse." His real official name is Petelgeuse Romanée Conti.) — Re:Zero − Starting Life in Another World	**Best Boy**: **Yuri Katsuki — Yuri on Ice**‡; Arataka Reigen — Mob Psycho 100; Izuku "Deku" Midoriya — My Hero Academia; Yakumo Yuurakutei — Descending Stories: Showa Genroku Rakugo Shinju; Most Popular "Other": Josuke Higashikata — JoJo's Bizarre Adventure: Diamond Is Unbreakable (season 3)
**Best Girl**: **Rem — Re:Zero − Starting Life in Another World**‡; Mumei — Kabaneri of the Iron Fortress; Nico Niiyama — Kiznaiver; Ochaco Uraraka — My Hero Academia; Most Popular "Other": Megumin — KonoSuba: God's Blessing on This Wonderful World!	**Best Opening**: **"History Maker" by Dean Fujioka — Yuri on Ice**‡; "99" by Mob Choir — Mob Psycho 100; "Kabaneri of the Iron Fortress" by Egoist — Kabaneri of the Iron Fortress; "Usurai Shinjū" by Megumi Hayashibara — Descending Stories: Showa Genroku Rakugo Shinju; Most Popular "Other": "Re:Re:" by Asian Kung-Fu Generation — Erased
**Best Ending**: **"You Only Live Once" by Wataru Hatano — Yuri on Ice**‡; "ninelie" by Aimer feat. chelly from Egoist — Kabaneri of the Iron Fortress; "Pipo Password" by TeddyLoid feat. Bonjour Suzuki — Space Patrol Luluco; "'Refrain Boy" by ALL OFF — Mob Psycho 100; Most Popular "Other": "Styx Helix" by Myth & Roid — Re:Zero − Starting Life in Another World	**Best Animation**: **Yuri on Ice — MAPPA**‡; Flip Flappers — Studio 3Hz; Kabaneri of the Iron Fortress — Wit Studio; Mob Psycho 100 — Bones; Most Popular "Other": Re:Zero − Starting Life in Another World — White Fox
**Best Fight Scene**: **Shigeo vs. Koyama — Mob Psycho 100**‡; Altland vs. Moss — Mobile Suit Gundam: Iron-Blooded Orphans; Deku vs. Kacchan — My Hero Academia; Mumei vs. Kabane — Kabaneri of the Iron Fortress; Most Popular Other: Naruto vs. Sasuke — Naruto Shippuden	**Best Drama**: **Erased — A-1 Pictures**‡; Descending Stories: Showa Genroku Rakugo Shinju — Studio Deen; Joker Game — Production I.G.; Kiznaiver — Studio Trigger; Most Popular "Other": Orange — TMS Entertainment
**Best Comedy**: **Haven't You Heard? I'm Sakamoto — Studio Deen**‡; Keijo — Xebec; KonoSuba: God's Blessing on This Wonderful World! — Studio Deen; Space Patrol Luluco — Studio Trigger; Most Popular "Other": Nanbaka — Satelight	**Best Couple**: **Yuri and Victor — Yuri on Ice**‡; Luluco and Nova — Space Patrol Luluco; Katsuhira and Sonozaki — Kiznaiver; Satoru and Kayo — Erased; Most Popular "Other": Subaru and Rem — Re:Zero − Starting Life in Another World
**Best Action**: **Mob Psycho 100 — Bones**‡; My Hero Academia — Bones; Drifters — Hoods Entertainment; Kabaneri of the Iron Fortress — Wit Studio; Most Popular "Other": JoJo's Bizarre Adventure: Diamond is Unbreakable (season 3) — David Production	**Most Heartwarming Scene**: **"The kiss" — Yuri on Ice**‡; "Kayo's first homecooked meal" — Erased; "Kakeru and Suwa learn to understand each other" — Orange; "Makoto flies over her new home" — Flying Witch; Most Popular "Other": "Rem's confession" — Re:Zero − Starting Life in Another World

== Statistics ==
Anime with multiple nominations
Nominations	Anime
9	Kabaneri of the Iron Fortress
8	Mob Psycho 100
7	My Hero Academia
7	Yuri on Ice
6	Erased
4	Descending Stories: Showa Genroku Rakugo Shinju
4	JoJo's Bizarre Adventure: Diamond is Unbreakable (season 3)
4	Kiznaiver
3	Space Patrol Luluco
2	Joker Game
2	Re:Zero − Starting Life in Another World

Anime with multiple wins
Wins	Anime
7	Yuri on Ice
2	Erased
2	Mob Psycho 100
