= Gatekeeper (Fire Emblem) =

Fire Emblem: Three Houses character

- Fire Emblem character
- The Gatekeeper in Fire Emblem Heroes
- First game: Fire Emblem: Three Houses (2019)
- Designed by: Chinatsu Kurahana
- Voiced by: EN: Kyle McCarley; Kylen Deporter; JA: Shinobu Matsumoto

The Gatekeeper (Japanese: 門番, Hepburn: Monban) is an unnamed character in Nintendo's tactical role-playing video game franchise Fire Emblem. First appearing in Fire Emblem: Three Houses (2019), he is a background character who serves as the gatekeeper of Garreg Mach, typically greeting the protagonist, Byleth, by telling them there is nothing to report.

Despite his minor role in the story and generic nature, the Gatekeeper became an unexpectedly popular character upon Three Houses's release, with players appreciating his spontaneous, kind nature and using him in a number of internet memes. He later returned in the spin-off Fire Emblem Warriors: Three Hopes (2022) and being voted #1 in a "Choose Your Legends" poll for Fire Emblem Heroes among male characters, leading to his addition into the game as a playable character. He also appears in the background of a stage in Super Smash Bros. Ultimate.

== Appearances ==
The Gatekeeper first appears in Fire Emblem: Three Houses. He is a background character who serves as the gatekeeper of Garreg Mach, though he typically notes that he has nothing to report when talked to. He may also talk about current events and his own personal feelings. He continues to serve as the gatekeeper following the beginning of the war started by Edelgard von Hresvelg.

He appears in the sequel, Fire Emblem Warriors: Three Hopes, which takes place in an alternate story set two years after Three Houses, showing what would have happened if Byleth did not come to Garreg Mach. He appears as a playable character in the crossover mobile game Fire Emblem Heroes after winning a "Choose Your Legends" poll as the #1 male character among Fire Emblem characters who had not yet won such an event. He had almost twice as many votes than any runner-ups. The Gatekeeper appears in the background of the Garreg Mach Academy stage in Super Smash Bros. Ultimate.

An Instagram filter that adds the Gatekeeper into the background of a photo was added by Nintendo.

== Concept and creation ==
The Gatekeeper was created by Chinatsu Kurahana for the video game Fire Emblem: Three Houses. He uses a generic model and art asset used by other certain background characters. The Gatekeeper was voiced by Shinobu Matsumoto in Japanese and Kyle McCarley in English. In Fire Emblem Heroes, the Gatekeeper's design was created by Yamada Akihiro.

== Reception ==
The Gatekeeper has been a popular character, having a large fanbase. He was ranked as the 15th best male character in Three Houses by Famitsu readers (out of 20). Due to his popularity that formed shortly after the release of Three Houses, which came about due to his kindness and pure-heartedness, he received fan-made content, including fanart. Fans also campaigned to Nintendo to make him a playable characters in Three Houses, something Polygon writer Petrana Radulovic expressed a desire to see in downloadable content. A hack of Three Houses was done by a player, which made the Gatekeeper into a playable character, with the player alleging that charm was set to maximum and his age and height was set to 20 and 1 cm respectively, the latter allegedly being the default for unused characters. Multiple critics expressed a desire to romance him, including Kotaku writer Nathan Grayson, Polygon writer Petrana Radulovic, and VG247 writer Eric Van Allen. Van Allen noted his disappointment that he couldn't romance him, finding him to be an endearing character, especially since the game has a strange romance option already.

After winning "Choose Your Legends" in Fire Emblem Heroes, he and fellow winner Marianne became a trending topic on Twitter. Kotaku writer Sisi Jiang expressed surprise over the Gatekeeper's appearance as a playable character in Fire Emblem Heroes, noting how out of place he was to characters like Marianne, Eirika, Marth, and other past winners. They felt that he won due to his meme status, but were impressed by how much effort went into the Gatekeeper's combat design. They appreciated how positive the Gatekeeper was, calling him "adorable" and feeling like Heroes made them like him better. IT Media writer Ankoro Daisuke was also surprised by his appearance, though noted he has always been popular, citing his appearances in drama CDs, card games, and Super Smash Bros. Ultimate. The Gamer writer Sergio Solorzano suggested that the character's charm was due to his simplicity, with his reports helping ground the player when the story gets more intense. He also noted that the popularity of his voice actor, Kyle McCarley, helped contribute to the Gatekeeper's. Despite the success of the Gatekeeper in the "Choose Your Legends" poll, some players argued that other characters deserved to be in more than him.
