= The Brilliant Healer's New Life in the Shadows =

Japanese light novel series

- First light novel volume cover

一瞬で治療していたのに役立たずと追放された天才治癒師、闇ヒーラーとして楽しく生きる (Isshun de Chiryou shiteita no ni Yakutatazu to Tsuihousareta Tensai Chiyushi, Yami Healer to shite Tanoshiku Ikiru)
- Genre: Adventure; Fantasy; Harem
- Novel series
- Written by: Sakaku Hishikawa
- Published by: Shōsetsuka ni Narō
- Original run: November 30, 2020 – present
- Light novel
- Written by: Sakaku Hishikawa
- Illustrated by: Daburyu
- Published by: SB Creative
- English publisher: NA: J-Novel Club Yen Press (print)
- Imprint: GA Novel
- Original run: October 14, 2021 – present
- Volumes: 8
- Manga
- Written by: Sakaku Hishikawa
- Illustrated by: Ten Jūnoichi
- Published by: SB Creative
- English publisher: NA: J-Novel Club Yen Press (print)
- Imprint: GA Comic
- Magazine: Piccoma
- Original run: January 22, 2022 – present
- Volumes: 5
- Manga
- Written by: Sakaku Hishikawa
- Illustrated by: Minsam; RocketStaff Inc.
- Published by: SB Creative
- Imprint: GA Comic
- Magazine: Piccoma
- Original run: January 2, 2025 – present
- Volumes: 3
- Anime television series
- Directed by: Joe Yoshizaki
- Written by: Taika Miyagi
- Music by: Toy's Factory; Harumi Fuuki
- Studio: Makaria (Note: Animation production assistance (アニメーション制作協力) for all episodes provided by Luminas.)
- Licensed by: Crunchyroll: SA/SEA: Medialink
- Original network: Tokyo MX, BS11, SUN, KBS, AT-X, TVh
- Original run: April 3, 2025 – present
- Episodes: 12
- icon

The Brilliant Healer's New Life in the Shadows (Japanese: 一瞬で治療していたのに役立たずと追放された天才治癒師、闇ヒーラーとして楽しく生きる, Hepburn: Isshun de Chiryou shiteita no ni Yakutatazu to Tsuihousareta Tensai Chiyushi, Yami Healer to shite Tanoshiku Ikiru) is a Japanese light novel series written by Sakaku Hishikawa and illustrated by Daburyu. It originally began serialization online in November 2020 on the user-generated novel publishing website Shōsetsuka ni Narō. It was later acquired by SB Creative, who began publishing it in print under their GA Novel imprint in October 2021, with eight volumes released as of March 2025. A manga adaptation illustrated by Ten Jūnoichi began serialization online on the Piccoma website and app in January 2022, with five tankōbon volumes released by SB Creative under their GA Comic imprint as of June 2025. A webtoon adaptation illustrated by Minsam and RocketStaff Inc. began serialization on the same website and app in January 2025. An anime television series adaptation produced by Makaria aired from April to June 2025. A second season has been announced.

== Plot ==
The Kingdom of Herzeth is dominated by the Healers, who use their power to enrich themselves rather than truly help those in need, and only those with official licenses can be recognized as Healers. However, Zenos, a powerful healer born in the slums, was never formally educated as a Healer and did not go through the official process (thereby not gaining a license) but instead learned his skills from a mysterious man. He eventually is asked to join an adventuring party, but is later brutally discarded when they fail to recognize his abilities and regard him as useless. Left without money and with few options, he finds a deserted building in the slum area and sets up an underground clinic with the help of Lily, a young elf-girl he rescued, and in time gains an incredible reputation as a healer, especially with the gangs that operate within the slums, as well as making friends with the female leaders of the gangs (as well as a female ghost that inhabits the upper floor of his building), who are all in love with him and fight for his affection. However, as news quickly spreads about the exceptional healer performing remarkable magic and helping to maintain the peace in the city's hidden corners, the officials begin massing their forces to destroy his operation, but Zenos does not plan to go down that easily.

== Characters ==
Zenos (ゼノス, Zenosu)
Voiced by: Shogo Sakata (Japanese); Eli Farmer (English)
A healer with no license, who learned his craft from a mysterious man, and recently kicked out of his adventurer group for being perceived as useless. Upon realizing he can use his craft to gain pay, he opens an 'underground clinic' in the slums inhabited by three rival demi-human gangs, vowing to never work for free again. Though polite, intelligent, and almost unshakably coolheaded, he is also notably naïve; his lack of formal training causes frequent confusion when others praise his magic as extraordinary or impossible, and he is oblivious to romantic feelings unless they're directly pointed out, and utterly skeptical when they are.
Lily (リリ, Riri)
Voiced by: Miharu Hanai (Japanese); Nia Celeste (English)
A young elf girl rescued by Zenos from slavery, who becomes his assistant. She's capable of simple magic and is a skilled cook and tea maker. Possibly the most levelheaded and mentally sound character, Lily often competes for Zenos's attention against all the other girls in his life as she has developed feelings for him.
Carmilla (カーミラ, Kāmira)
Voiced by: Yoko Hikasa (Japanese); Molly Zhang (English)
A wraith who inhabits the upper floor of the abandoned mansion Zenos and Lily take over, she died 300 years before the story begins. Initially hostile, she soon yielded the ground floor to them after seeing that her magic was no match for Zenos, and soon became a friendly (though tsundere) acquaintance.
Zophia (ゾフィア, Zofia)
Voiced by: Anna Nagase (Japanese); Mallorie Rodak (English)
Also called "Zophia the Tornado", she is one of the 'big three' leaders of the slums' demi-human gangs. Calm and confident, she is a lizardkin who runs the gang of lizardmen, known for robbing rich merchants and assisting the downtrodden. The first gang leader to meet Zenos, he earns her respect and affection after easily amputating and replacing her poisoned arm.
Lynga (リンガ, Ringa)
Voiced by: Mashiro Hitaka (Japanese); Mary Morgan (English)
Also called "Lynga the Tyrant", she is one of the 'big three' leaders of the slums' demi-human gangs. Ditzy and childish but a fierce warrior, she is a wolf beastkin who runs the gang of werewolves in charge of illegal gambling. The second gang leader to meet Zenos, she initially attacked him for aiding the lizardmen, but wholeheartedly surrendered due to a fear of Carmilla. She too develops feelings for him.
Loewe (レーヴェ, Rēve)
Voiced by: Sayaka Kikuchi (Japanese); Cassie Ewulu (English)
Also called "Loewe the Mighty", she is of the 'big three' leaders of the slums' demi-human gangs. Amicable, strong, and a big eater, she is an ogress who runs the gang of orcs dealing in the excavation of mana stones. The final gang leader to meet Zenos, she swore the orcs to him after he cut an explosive stone she'd ingested out of her belly, despite knowing that letting her die would yield him the orcs' entire fortune. Like the other two gang leaders, she is also in love with Zenos.
Krishna (クリシュナ, Kurishuna)
Voiced by: Yuki Nakashima (Japanese); Emily Lopez (English)
Also called the "Iron Rose", she is Vice-Commander of the city's Royal Order of Knights, and the youngest to ever hold the title. While a fierce warrior and master gunslinger, among her self-professed bad habits are her short temper, a poor sense of direction, and jumping to conclusions. She became a knight after her mother, who visited the slums to do charity, was supposedly killed while being robbed. Initially sent to the slums to identify and put an end to the mediator who brought peace between the three demi-human gangs, she becomes Zenos's ally after he and Zophia help her destroy a child-trafficking ring, making her see that Zenos isn't a bad person, and may have feelings for him.
Zonde (ゾンデ)
Voiced by: Taku Yashiro (Japanese); Jesse Pinnick (English)
A lizardkin, Zophia's brother, and right-hand man. He was the second person Zenos healed after leaving the Golden Phoenix, and his putting Zenos in contact with Zophia was the start of Zenos's climb in popularity.
Aston (アストン, Asuton)
Voiced by: Masaaki Mizunaka (Japanese); Nick Huber (English)
The leader of Zenos' former party, the Golden Phoenix. A vain and arrogant man who lived his entire life coasting on others' abilities, he realized much too late that his party's success was due entirely to Zenos's silent support. His failed desire to re-recruit Zenos turned to lust for revenge against the healer, ultimately leading to him getting arrested and losing everything he owned, down to the clothes on his back. It is later revealed that his dark nature originated from his failure to save his dying sister.
The Guide
Voiced by: Koki Uchiyama
The main antagonist of the series, who is the most dangerous criminal in the slums' underground guild; a brilliant and mysterious madman who wields dark magical prowess dating back to the era of the Demon King, 300 years in the past. He takes jobs free of charge if they interest him, and equates his wicked plans to theatrical tragedies. He goes into hiding after Zenos foils the rampaging golem he set on the slums and prevents any casualties, intrigued by the healer's power and expecting to meet him again. Later on, it is revealed that the Guide is a demon possessing the body of a deceased healer named Afread.
Becker (ベッカー, Bekkā)
Voiced by: Takehito Koyasu (Japanese); David Matranga (English)
An elite healer from the Royal Hospital who recruits Zenos to investigate Goldran, the vice director of the Royal Hospital. In truth, he wanted to learn the truth about an incident that took place thirteen years ago. He learned about how Goldran murdered several people including his fiancée to save a noble's life to earn their favor and plotted his own revenge. He was thwarted by Zenos and willingly surrendered after realizing that his revenge wasn't right. But in reality, he wanted to stop Goldran from taking over the Royal Hospital, revenge was a mere bonus.
Umin (ウミン)
Voiced by: Hikaru Tono
A healer from the Royal Hospital and Becker's niece/assistant. She also seems to have feelings for Zenos.
Cresson (クレソン, Kureson)
Voiced by: Setsuo Itō
A healer from the Royal Hospital and Umin's classmate. Other than Umin, he is the first friend Zenos makes as they make their way towards Goldran's echelon. Initially, he looked down on Zenos, but came to respect him as he saw just how talented he was. As a result, Cresson became Zenos's self-proclaimed brother.
Goldran (ゴルドラン, Gorudoran)
Voiced by: Tetsu Inada
The vice-director of the Royal Hospital in the running for candidacy of the hospital's Director position. He does not like demi-humans. He is suspected to be involved with the disappearance of an important healer by Dr. Becker, who asks Zenos to investigate him. It is revealed later on, that Goldran murdered several people 13 years ago in order to save a noble and earn their favor. One of those people was Dr. Becker's fiancée. After learning the truth, he plotted his revenge, but was stopped by Zenos. Goldran was subsequently stripped of his wealth and imprisoned for his crimes.
Til
A young Beast-kin whom Zenos buys and frees from slavery after freeing her from a demon that was possessing her. In return, she led Zenos to the herbs that he needed.
Calendor
An aristocrat who runs a child human trafficking operation while under the guise of educating children. He is eventually discovered and defeated by Zenos' group.
Yuma
An archer who was formerly a member of the Golden Phoenix. He was forced to retire following an injury.
Andres
A mage who was formerly a member of the Golden Phoenix. He was injured in a quest and was sent to a hospital. It is unknown what happens to him afterwards.
Guile
A mage who was formerly a member of the Golden Phoenix. After being blamed by Aston for attempting to harm Zenos, he leaves the party. It is unknown what happened to him afterwards.
Fennel
A lord who aided Goldran, until learning of his true colors. He is Charlotte's father.
Charlotte
Fennel's spoiled daughter. She appears to have developed feelings for Zenos after he heals her.
Madam Milk
Goldran's dog. Her owner deeply cares for her.
Bons
Goldran's first secretary. He is always drunk due to his alcohol addiction.
Afread
A deceased healer whose body is possessed by the Guide.
Veritra
Another unlicensed healer who studied under the same master as Zenos. Her whereabouts are unknown.

== Media ==
=== Light novel ===
Written by Sakaku Hishikawa, The Brilliant Healer's New Life in the Shadows began serialization on the user-generated novel publishing website Shōsetsuka ni Narō on November 30, 2020. It was later acquired by SB Creative who began publishing it with illustrations by Daburyu under their GA Novel imprint on October 14, 2021. Eight volumes have been released as of March 15, 2025. The light novels are licensed in English by J-Novel Club. In January 2025, J-Novel Club announced that a print version would begin publication in August 2025.

No.	Original release date	Original ISBN	North American release date	North American ISBN
1	October 14, 2021	978-4-8156-1020-3	December 7, 2023 (digital); August 12, 2025 (print)	978-1-7183-1954-7 (digital); 978-1-7183-3270-6 (print)
2	February 11, 2022	978-4-8156-1193-4	February 29, 2024 (digital); October 14, 2025 (print)	978-1-7183-1956-1 (digital); 978-1-7183-3271-3 (print)
3	July 14, 2022	978-4-8156-1611-3	May 28, 2024 (digital); November 11, 2025 (print)	978-1-7183-1958-5 (digital); 978-1-7183-3272-0 (print)
4	November 12, 2022	978-4-8156-1612-0	September 13, 2024 (digital); January 13, 2026 (print)	978-1-7183-1960-8 (digital); 978-1-7183-3273-7 (print)
5	July 14, 2023	978-4-8156-2257-2	December 20, 2024 (digital); March 10, 2026 (print)	978-1-7183-1962-2 (digital); 978-1-7183-3274-4 (print)
6	March 15, 2024	978-4-8156-2465-1	June 2, 2025 (digital); May 11, 2026 (print)	978-1-7183-1964-6 (digital); 978-1-7183-3275-1 (print)
7	November 15, 2024	978-4-8156-2720-1	September 8, 2025 (digital); July 14, 2026 (print)	978-1-7183-1966-0 (digital); 978-1-7183-3276-8 (print)
8	March 15, 2025	978-4-8156-2721-8	December 15, 2025 (digital); November 10, 2026 (print)	978-1-7183-1968-4 (digital); 978-1-7183-3277-5 (print)

=== Manga ===
A manga adaptation illustrated by Ten Jūnoichi began serialization on the Piccoma website and app on January 22, 2022. SB Creative has collected the manga's chapters into six tankōbon volumes under their GA Comic imprint as of April 2026. The manga adaptation is also licensed in English by J-Novel Club. In January 2025, J-Novel Club announced that a print version of the manga would begin publication in July 2025.

No.	Original release date	Original ISBN	North American release date	North American ISBN
1	August 11, 2022	978-4-8156-1052-4	December 6, 2023 (digital); July 15, 2025 (print)	978-1-7183-0766-7 (digital); 978-1-7183-3740-4 (print)
2	June 15, 2023	978-4-8156-1310-5	March 27, 2024 (digital); September 9, 2025 (print)	978-1-7183-0767-4 (digital); 978-1-7183-3741-1 (print)
3	March 15, 2024	978-4-8156-1876-6	July 2, 2025 (digital); March 10, 2026 (print)	978-1-7183-0768-1 (digital); 978-1-7183-3742-8 (print)
4	November 15, 2024	978-4-8156-1877-3	September 24, 2025 (digital); June 9, 2026 (print)	978-1-7183-0769-8 (digital); 978-1-7183-3743-5 (print)
5	June 14, 2025	978-4-8156-1878-0	March 25, 2026 (digital); January 12, 2027 (print)	978-1-7183-0770-4 (digital); 978-1-7183-3744-2 (print)
6	April 15, 2026	978-4-8156-3190-1	—	—

=== Webtoon ===
A webtoon adaptation illustrated by Minsam and RocketStaff Inc. was announced during the "GA Fes 2024" livestream event on March 9, 2024. It was originally set to begin serialization on the same website and app in Q3 2024, but was delayed for unknown reasons. It later began serialization on January 2, 2025. SB Creative has collected the webtoon's chapters into three volumes as of July 2025.

No.	Original release date	Original ISBN	North American release date	North American ISBN
1	April 14, 2025	978-4-8156-2834-5	—	—
2	May 15, 2025	978-4-8156-2835-2	—	—
3	July 12, 2025	978-4-8156-2836-9	—	—

=== Anime ===
An anime television series adaptation was also announced during the "GA Fes 2024" livestream event on March 9, 2024. It is produced by Makaria and directed by Joe Yoshizaki, with scripts written by Taika Miyagi, characters designed by denpuougi and Yoshihiro Sawada, and music composed by Harumi Fuuki. The series aired from April 3 to June 19, 2025, on Tokyo MX and other networks. The opening theme song is "Light Maker" (ライトメイカー), performed by bokula, while the ending theme song is "Tsuki ni Negau" (月に願う; To Wish Upon the Moon), performed by sorato. Crunchyroll streams the series. Medialink licensed the series in South, Southeast Asia and Oceania (except Australia and New Zealand) for streaming on Ani-One Asia's YouTube channel.

A second season was announced during the "GA Fes 2026: GA 20th Anniversary" livestream event on January 4, 2026.

==== Episodes ====
No.	Title	Directed by (Note: Production staff information is taken from the ending credits of each episode.)	Storyboarded by	Original release date
1	"An Equal Price"; Transliteration: "Sōō no Taika" (Japanese: 相応の対価)	Taika Miyagi	Parkji-seung & Eishin Fujita	April 3, 2025
The illegal underground healer Zenos lives with his assistant Lily the elf and the ghost Carmilla in the slums of the Herzeth Kingdom. Herzeth is famous for its healers who train at colleges, yet Zenos is unique in that he taught himself healing magic ministering to the sick and injured of the slums. He is frequently visited by the three top gang-leaders: Zophia, Lynga, and Loewe, who respectively lead the Lizard-kin, Beast-kin, and Ogre gangs and steal from the rich to give to the poor. While on his rounds, Zenos encounters an ill Beast-kin slave named Til being abused by her master into grave robbing the slum cemetery. The girl becomes possessed by a spirit after accidentally damaging a gravestone and attacks her master. After curing the girl's possession Zenos also heals her master, but takes all of his cash and the girl as payment. After the man flees, Zenos diagnoses Til with gallstones which he uses magic to remove painlessly. On the basis that all work deserves fair payment, Zenos has Til lead him to wild herbs needed for Lily's cooking, after which he sets her free as her payment. Til leaves to find her life's purpose and promises to visit Zenos one day to show him her success. Zenos returns home and finds Zophia, Lynga and Loewe cooking his dinner, having eaten the dinner Lily cooked earlier and bringing her masses of new ingredients as an apology.
2	"The Underground Healer in the Abandoned Part of Town"; Transliteration: "Haikyo-gai no Yami Hīrā" (Japanese: 廃墟街の闇ヒーラー)	Yuri Hagiwara & Hiroto Miyagi	Tatsu Yamamoto	April 10, 2025
In the past, Zenos is kicked from his party Golden Phoenix by the leader, Aston, who claims employing an illegal healer will damage their reputation among the nobility. Immediately after leaving, Zenos encounters slavers murdering their slave girl, Lily, so Zenos buys and heals her. Zenos later heals the adventurer Zonde and is surprised when Zonde pays him, having never once been paid by Aston. Realizing his skills have value, Zenos decides to open an underground clinic, since slum dwellers like himself are forbidden from obtaining healer licenses. By chance, the rundown house he chooses is inhabited by a wraith. Fortunately, Zenos is aware healing magic is fatal to undead, since Aston used to trap him in dungeons full of undead. The wraith, Carmilla, realizes she cannot defeat Zenos and allows him to use the ground floor as a clinic while she resides on the second floor. Zonde visits with his sister Zophia, suffering from a bullet wound in her arm. Despite knowing Zophia is a dangerous gang boss, Zenos negotiates a high fee to amputate the arm, then completely regenerate a brand new one. Everyone is astounded by his skill which far surpasses other healers, which Zenos is unaware of. Soon he is being visited by all three gang bosses and their men, providing plenty of business as the gangs are constantly fighting and injuring each other. Lynga is the next to visit and is hostile towards him, but his defense magic and Carmilla force her to surrender.
3	"Struggle"; Transliteration: "Sōdatsu-sen" (Japanese: 争奪戦)	Toshihiro Nagao & Yuri Hagiwara	Sakusan	April 17, 2025
Continuing his flashback, Zenos meets Loewe and diagnoses her as having swallowed an explosive crystal. Loewe offers him her gang's wealth to fund treatments for poor people if she dies. Zenos removes the stone instantly and refuses her money, considering it too generous when the surgery lasted barely a second. Zophia, Lynga, and Loewe visit the clinic regularly and Carmilla suggests they might be in love with him, which could escalate the conflict. This makes Lily jealous. Zenos assumes this is impossible, since he is just an unlicensed healer. That same afternoon, the three bosses declare war for the slums. Exasperated, Zenos attends and heals every fighter the moment they are injured so not one person dies. Realizing fighting is pointless the three agree to peace, except for the fight over Zenos, which they keep secretly to themselves. Lily also confesses her feelings for Zenos, but he doesn't fully understand. Word of the truce reaches the Royal Knights, who fear peace might cause the slum dwellers to band together against normal citizens, maybe even against the aristocracy. To prevent this, Vice-Commander Krishna is sent to investigate. Interrogating gang members, Krishna is surprised by their loyalty towards the anonymous mediator who ended the fighting. She also witnesses Zophia and Zonde healed of the magical bullet wounds she gave them earlier and is forced to flee to avoid unwanted attention. Becoming lost in the unfamiliar slums, she coincidentally asks for directions at Zenos' clinic, only to shoot him when she sees Lily is an elf.
4	"A Righteous Hero"; Transliteration: "Seigi no Hīrō" (Japanese: 正義のヒーロー)	Tobita Hiroki & Hon Tatsuyama	Tatsu Yamamoto	April 24, 2025
Krishna accuses Zenos of enslaving an elven child, until Lily explains how Zenos saved her. Krishna is surprised Zenos is unaffected by her bullet, mostly due to his defensive magic, and decides he must be a grand sorcerer. She demands that Zenos cooperates with her investigation into the "mediator", and the illegal slave trade in children. He allows her to stay in his clinic for the time being, though this makes Lily jealous. Zenos deduces that Krishna hates the slums and she admits her mother would visit the slums to do charity work, until a thief killed her. The next day, Zophia visits and almost fights Krishna, as it was she who injured her in the first place, only to end up arguing that Krishna is so brainwashed by the idea of noble superiority she hasn't even realized the slaver is Lord Calendor, common knowledge among the slum dwellers. Krishna finds this hard to believe. To prevent a fight, Zenos admits he is the healer and the "mediator". Krishna furiously leaves and visits Calendor's mansion to investigate it in hopes of proving Zophia wrong, discovering a dungeon full of kidnapped children. Calendor shoots her with her own gun, but Zenos and Zophia appear, rescue her and beat up Calendor. She is amazed when Zenos heals her bullet wounds and realizes Zenos is the true hero of the slums. She finally understands why her mother would visit the slums despite the danger and decides to make her proud by seeking real justice. As the children are rescued, she asks why Zenos got there so quickly to rescue her and finds it funny when he claims it was because of her unpaid clinic fees, smiling for the first time since her mother died.
5	"A Place to Belong"; Transliteration: "Ibasho" (Japanese: 居場所)	Kenyu Kimura, Ryuuta Nakano, Isao Otaki & Yuri Hagiwara	Jiro Arimoto	May 1, 2025
In the past, Aston takes a young Zenos as his party's servant. In their arrogance, they never noticed Zenos healing their injuries and became overconfident in their average level abilities. On their first quest without Zenos, they were all seriously injured: their archer Yuma is forced into retirement and mage Andres is almost burned to death. Aston is furious when temporary healer Umin insists that the instant healing he is demanding from her is a Saint-level ability. Aston decides to rehire Zenos, hoping he can still impress his employer Lord Fennel, who fired his party for failing to get what he wanted. Aston and his only remaining mage Guile attempt to hire Zophia, Lynga, and Loewe to find Zenos, but they refuse to help since they are aware of how they treated Zenos before and threaten them to leave Zenos alone. Aston encounters Zenos by chance and is furious when Zenos only offers his assistance for a ridiculously high fee. He attempts to murder Zenos, but is stopped by Krishna, blames Guile, then flees. Zophia fears Aston might hire the Underground Guild to get revenge on Zenos. Zenos stays awake that night guarding the clinic, and admits to Carmilla that in his youth, he tried to revive a corpse, which he was unaware was forbidden black magic. Carmilla tells him if he wants an obedient servant, he could use demon sorcery to create a golem. By sheer unfortunate coincidence, a giant golem begins destroying the slums nearby.
6	"The End of Adventure"; Transliteration: "Bōken no Owari" (Japanese: 冒険の終わり)	Kenyu Kimura	Natsuto Fujiwara	May 8, 2025
Shortly before the golem attack, Aston hires a member of the Underground Guild known as the Guide to get revenge on Zenos. Zenos heals hundreds of people hurt by the golem and is annoyed he can't keep track of everyone to know what fees to charge them. Zenos and the gangs battle the golem, who is capable of regenerating, and Zenos notices the golem deliberately avoid hurting a young girl. Zenos determines the golem is powered by Aston's hatred and Aston himself is its core. Having been watching the whole thing, the Guide is curious whether Zenos will kill Aston to stop the golem. Zenos feels sympathy for Aston, who lost his sister in childhood when he couldn't afford medicine. Rather than kill him, Zenos takes the difficult route of slicing Aston out of the golem a piece at a time and healing his flesh before the stone can fuse to him again. Aston realizes he let his grief over his sister turn him into a greedy bully and sincerely apologizes to Zenos. Not willing to forgive him so easily, Zenos knocks him unconscious then takes his legendary sword to pay for rebuilding the slums before Krishna arrests him for his crimes, leaving him only a single gold coin to start a new life after Krishna lets him out of prison. As Zenos is exhausted, Zophia, Lynga and Loewe carry him home. Seeing how powerful Zenos is, the Guide decides to go into hiding, but is certain he and Zenos will meet again.
7	"Special Service"; Transliteration: "Tokubetsu Sābisu" (Japanese: 特別サービス)	Kamadon	Masao Suzuki & Sakusan	May 15, 2025
Neither Krishna or the gang leaders learn much about the Guide before Zenos makes everyone leave the clinic. Zenos decides to spend one day recovering from the battle, so everyone invites him to a hot springs. Carmilla decides to tag along for amusement. The gang leaders and Krishna battle over Zenos' chastity in the men's bath, until he banishes them back to the women's side. Lily is upset that she has the smallest chest compared to everyone there, but Carmilla assures her that some men prefer smaller sizes. Also a guest, Umin spots Carmilla, but fails to exorcise her. With the girls causing chaos, Zenos hasn't relaxed at all. The spring owner is injured when his oven blows up. Umin insists he is to be taken to a Royal Hospital, but Zenos nonchalantly heals the man in gratitude for his excellent cooking, convincing Umin that he must be a Saint. Umin reports this to her superior Becker, who decides to meet Zenos after learning that he wears a distinctive black coat. Becker visits the slums pretending to be ill and is taken to Zenos' clinic. He is disappointed that Zenos is not the man he was looking for; Zenos having inherited his black coat from his master whom Becker once knew. Becker decides to hire Zenos for an investigation at the hospital. Zenos agrees, hoping to learn more about his mysterious master, who was so secretive Zenos did not even know his name.
8	"The Royal Hospital"; Transliteration: "Ōritsu Chiryō-in" (Japanese: 王立治療院)	Otaki Isao	Fujiwara Natsuto	May 22, 2025
Zenos poses as a student named Zeno at the hospital. Becker reveals that people have gone missing, including a mage named Afread, who worked with Becker in the past to eradicate the disease Red Lung. Umin points out that Professor Goldran, the Deputy Director, openly gives better treatment to the nobility to advance his political career. Umin believes Goldran was involved in Afread's disappearance. Umin is also certain Goldran will try to recruit Zenos, though Zenos is uncertain why since he is merely an unlicensed slum healer. In the past, Zenos studied under his master with fellow unlicensed healer Veritra. While attending class, Zenos is confused by a professor's claim that wraiths that can speak, such as Carmilla, are the most dangerous. Goldran's underling Cresson, who doesn't treat Zenos with much respect, claims to have exorcised 30 ghosts, so he is furious when Zenos nonchalantly claims he can exorcise 50 with one spell. Cresson attempts to embarrass Zenos by asking him to draw a minor healing circle, yet becomes madly jealous when Zenos draws a circle that can regenerate missing limbs, impressing the professor. Learning of this, Goldran decides to send Zenos and other students to a graveyard overrun with ghosts, accompanied by Umin. Zenos exorcises the entire graveyard with one spell, though Cresson quickly takes the credit, to Umin's annoyance. A Zombie King appears and Cresson panics, knowing he isn't capable of defeating it, but unwilling to admit it in front of witnesses. At Umin's request, Zenos lets the King beat Cresson up first, then exorcises it and heals Cresson all with the same spell.
9	"Faction Infiltration"; Transliteration: "Habatsu Sen'nyū" (Japanese: 派閥潜入)	Ryuta Nakano	Saori Tanaka	May 29, 2025
Zenos believes undead are attracted to stronger undead, so he insists Carmilla follow him everywhere in case more Zombie Kings appear. Cresson admits to Goldran's second secretary that Zenos defeated the Zombie King. Goldran concludes that Zenos' abilities are legitimate and invites him to join his followers. During this, Zenos notices that Goldran uses Health Transfer magic, taking life energy from healthy people to heal sickness and injuries. This is seen as revolutionary and almost guarantees Goldran will become the next Director. Cresson reveals that Afread disappeared after attending one of Goldran's private dinners. Becker offers Zenos a bonus if he can be invited to the next dinner and report what goes on. Cresson is put in charge of Goldran's dog, Madam Milk, and is mocked by Goldran's first secretary, Bons, who due to being Goldran's friend, does no actual work. Bons drunkenly causes Milk to be hit by a carriage. Cresson panics, so Zenos heals her without leaving any scars as evidence. Cresson is confused that what Zenos considers basic healing is actually elite magic. Umin apologizes for dragging Zenos into the investigation, but Zenos is fine with it as he is being paid and can learn about his master. Carmilla is amused when another woman is interested in Zenos. Cresson suddenly begs Zenos for help with a major problem. Meanwhile, the three gang bosses try to do housework for Zenos.
10	"A Request from a Noble Lady"; Transliteration: "Kizoku Reijō no Negai" (Japanese: 貴族令嬢の願い)	Tatsu Yamamoto & Yuri Hagiwara	Sakusan	June 5, 2025
Goldran is asked by Lord Fennel to heal his daughter Charlotte of Odd-face, a facial growth she insists be removed without leaving scars. Cresson, having taken credit for healing Milk without a scar, is ordered to assist Goldran. Cresson is forced to beg Zenos for help as he fears the consequences of scarring a noblewoman's face. Charlotte turns out to be a brat who impossibly demands the growth be removed without surgery. Tired of her moaning, Zenos heals her injured pet bird and rudely tells her to either keep the growth or trust him. Seeing her bird healed, Charlotte agrees to surgery. Still believing Cresson is the one who heals without scars, Goldran demands that he does the surgery. Zenos manages to guide him through the surgery, but Cresson discovers the growth has infiltrated Charlotte's facial nerves, risking paralysing her face. Fearing for his reputation, Goldran intends to cut the nerve himself and then blames Cresson for the mistake in front of Fennel, planning to repair the nerve later with Health Transfer to gain Fennel's support. Disgusted, Zenos pushes Goldran aside, repairs the nerve, and heals the wound without a scar. Fennel is thrilled with "Goldran's" surgery and decides to support him in becoming Director. Charlotte takes an interest in Zenos. Goldran invites Cresson and Zenos to a private dinner that evening.
11	"Just a Normal Healer"; Transliteration: "Tada no Chiyu-shi" (Japanese: ただの治癒師)	Kamadon	Sakusan	June 12, 2025
At Goldran's dinner, Zenos and Lily get Bons, who isn't willing to talk, even drunker until he reveals that Goldran only got a job at the hospital with Fennel's support following an explosion 13 years ago. Meanwhile, Zonde almost dies in a construction accident and Zophia rushes to get him to Zenos without ruining his investigation. Carmilla deduces if Goldran healed Fennel after an explosion, he would have spread the story to become famous, yet he covered it up instead. Lily suggests someone else healed Fennel, but Goldran stole the credit and bribed Bons to stay quiet. This could mean that if Bons told the story to Afread that Afread is in hiding from Goldran. Zenos suggests a much darker possibility. An explosion would have injured multiple people, so it is possible Goldran caused the explosion himself to injure Fennel, then used Health Transfer to take life energy from the other victims, killing them, but healing Fennel so that Fennel would owe him a debt. Zenos sends Carmilla to tell both theories to Becker. Zonde worsens, so Zophia is forced to head to the party to find Zenos with the help of the other gang bosses and Umin, but the guards won't allow them in. Goldran dislikes the demi-humans' presence, but after they defeat the guards, Zenos begins healing Zonde and reveals that he never intended to join Goldran at all before leaving. A disgusted Goldran swears to ruin Zenos' career. Cresson, realizing the kind of man Goldran is, abandons him and follows Zenos, impressing Umin. Becker thanks Zenos for his work and promises to leave him a letter with everything he knows about Zenos' master. Later, Becker is seen standing over Goldran and his supporters, all seemingly poisoned.
12	"Choosing Who Lives"; Transliteration: "Inochi no Sentaku" (Japanese: 命の選択)	Kenyu Kimura, Ryuta Nakano & Otaki Isao	Natsuto Fujiwara, Norikasu Ishigooka & Kenyu Kimura	June 19, 2025
It is revealed that 13 years ago, Goldran witnessed an explosion and used Health Transfer magic to save Fennel, while Bons took a photograph of the spell killing injured factory workers. Zenos and Umin find Bons' photograph in Becker's office and discover that Afread was one of the workers who survived, and one of the women Goldran murdered was Becker's fiancée. Becker explains that Goldran must choose to save either himself, Fennel, or the supporters whose votes he needs. Goldran chooses to kill his supporters to cure himself. Zenos and Umin interrupt and Cresson yells at Becker for poisoning innocent people. Zenos cures everybody by continually healing the damage to their bodies until the poison naturally wears off. Becker realizes his actions insulted his fiancée's memory and apologizes. Goldran's supporters realize he was going to kill them to save himself and turn on him, as does Fennel. Becker admits he only used a paralysis drug to scare Goldran and was surprised to find the wine already contained a poison, probably put there by Afread to kill Goldran. As he never intended to hurt anyone, Krishna sets Becker free. Becker suspects Afread actually was killed 13 years ago and somebody used his identity to get close to Goldran, someone who might now want revenge on Zenos. Nearby, the person posing as Afread reveals to be the Guide, who is actually a demon possessing his body. Goldran is imprisoned for murder. Zenos and Lily return to the slums and await their next patient.

== Reception ==
=== Sales ===
By March 2024, the series had 200,000 copies in circulation.

=== Critical response ===
Rebecca Silverman of Anime News Network gave the first five volumes of the light novel an overall B+ grade, writing, "The Brilliant Healer's New Life in the Shadows is, on the whole, a surprisingly good series. It doesn't break the mold, but it does stretch it in positive ways, and Zenos is easy to get behind as a protagonist. Add in a total lack of status screens and some interesting side characters and you have a series that feels better than it has any right to be."

Richard Eisenbeis of Anime News Network, in his review of the first two episodes of the anime adaptation, gave them an overall C+ grade. He wrote, "The interactions between Zenos and the demi-human girls are the focus of the show with action and intrigue being secondary. However, that said, there was a surprising amount of depth to both Zenos and the setting. This one most likely won't be topping any "best of the season" lists but if it carries on as is, it will be enjoyable to anyone who likes the non-revenge-focused "kicked out of the heroes' party" stories."

== See also ==
- Now I'm a Demon Lord!, another light novel series illustrated by Daburyu
