= Shigeo Kageyama =

Fictional character from Mob Psycho 100

- Mob Psycho 100 character
- Shigeo Kageyama, as illustrated by One
- First appearance: Mob Psycho 100 Chapter 1 (2012)
- Created by: One
- Portrayed by: Tatsuomi Hamada
- Voiced by: Japanese: Setsuo Itō; English: Kyle McCarley (seasons 1–2); Jason Liebrecht (season 3)

In-universe information
- Gender: Male
- Occupation: Student
- Nationality: Japanese

Shigeo Kageyama (Japanese: 影山茂夫, Hepburn: Kageyama Shigeo), nicknamed "Mob" (モブ, Mobu), is the protagonist of the manga series Mob Psycho 100, created by One. Shigeo Kageyama is an average middle school-aged boy. Although he looks like an inconspicuous person, he is in fact a powerful esper with immense psychic power. To keep from losing control of this power, he constantly lives a life under an emotional shackle. In order to help learn how to control his abilities, Mob works as an assistant to con-man Reigen Arataka, a self-proclaimed spirit medium. Mob wants to live a normal life just like those around him, but a barrage of trouble keeps coming after him. With his suppressed emotions growing inside Mob little by little, his power threatens to break through its limits as he eventually encounters other espers like the Claws.

One created Mob as a contrast to his previous protagonist from One Punch Man, Saitama, aiming to portray Mob as a weak hero who still gets involved in several fights and forms new relationships thanks to his kindness. The character is voiced by Setsuo Ito in Japanese. In the first two seasons, he was voiced by Kyle McCarley in English. In the live-action series adaptation, he is portrayed by Tatsuomi Hamada.

Critical response to Shigeo Kageyama has been generally positive, for proving to be an unconventional anime protagonist due to his rejection of his super powers and desire to focus on other parts of his life in order to become popular. Despite giving such attitude, Mob was praised for his dynamic with his mentor Reigen and how he often ends up taking part in interesting fight scenes or comedy.

== Creation ==
Mob was created by manga artist One as a contrast to the strong character Saitama, who is the protagonist of his earlier One-Punch Man. Unlike Saitama, Mob is weak and delicate. As a result, he is supported by the rest of the characters starring in the series. Mob was written to come across as a nice person, fit of being an ideal protagonist; Instead of running away from scary situations or people, Mob faces his nemesis to the point of being heroic. However, Mob is "meant to come off as somewhat standoffish or nerdy". When Bones announced they would adapt the manga series, One requested that Mob's characterization be faithful to the original series. According to Comic Book Resources, One said that Mob was based on himself during his youth as he barely expressed his desires of becoming a manga artist during his time at school.

Director Yuzuru Tachikawa said Mob carries realistic traits for an anime protagonist as he is only interested in becoming a popular student. Director Yoshimichi Kameda also relates to Mob due to their poor confidence on themselves and thus are unable to properly express themselves. For the adaptation of the manga, the anime staff wanted to properly focus on Mob's character and how, little by little, he starts relying more on his powers to defend himself. The second season was made with need of Mob facing more supernatural beings. Tachikawa also finds unique how Mob rejects his supernatural powers. Answering to Tachikawa, One said that the concept behind the series comes from Mob's kindness and connections. When it turned into a fighting series, One came up with the idea of Mob having esper powers for slice of life chapters. Nevertheless, the protagonist's kindness remained intact due to how he changes people's lives citing Dimple's changes of personality after meeting Mob.

=== Casting ===
Mob is voiced by Setsuo Itō. He recalls being nervous during recording for the first episode of the first season, to the point he barely slept in the previous day. During the auditions, Ito was surprised by the other actors working in the series who kept supporting him. Still, the actor was not able to be more healthy until the eighth episode of the first season. Ito was glad that Reigen was voiced by Takahiro Sakurai as he admired him from a very young age giving him more parallels to the relationship between the duo. One was glad with Ito's performance, claiming he fits Mob's personality.

According the actor, Mob's growth is moderate with one example being when he joins the bodybuilding club and starts working out. That's just one example of how what you see on screen over time allow his character to change, which appealed to the voice actor. Since he was performing the same character in the plays, Ito's feelings involving the protagonist remained similar but with a different atmosphere as he was working with from anime voice actors to stage actors. The atmosphere of being on stage and surrounded by an audience was also different. By the time the third season was green-lighted, Ito was glad with how much work he has been doing, feeling he became more confident in the past years and came to like more his character as well as his relationship with Reigen.

For the English dub of the series, Mob was voiced by Kyle McCarley who voiced him in the first two seasons but expressed doubts as redoing his work for the third. In the stage play, Mob is portrayed by Ito again. Tatsuomi Hamada portrays Mob in live-Action Drama.

== Appearances ==
=== Mob Psycho 100 ===
Mob is an eighth grade Esper with powerful psychic abilities. His bowl-cut hairstyle is his defining physical feature. He is not good at reading the atmosphere, and since childhood, has rarely felt or displayed intense emotion, typically having a dull expression on his face. He thinks his power is unnecessary in his life, so he avoids using it. He suppresses his emotions to keep his power in control, but when the percentage of his accumulated feelings reaches 100, he is overcome by the strongest emotion he is currently feeling and unleashes the full extent of his powers. He works at Reigen's spirit counsel for 300 yen an hour. After being begged to join the Telepathy Club to prevent their dissolution, he instead chose to join the Body Improvement Club hoping not only to impress his secret love, Tsubomi, but also to improve himself as a person. He is credited as Salt Middle School's urabanchō (裏番長 is roughly translated as "secret school gang leader") known as White T Poison, but this remains unknown to many including himself. Mob also possesses an unknown power which far surpasses even the height of his abilities, but is uncontrollable and only awakens when unconscious, and is called ???%.

During the narrative, Mob encounters Claw, a criminal organization composed of many other Espers, gathering others with psychic powers for their scheme to achieve world domination. Group leader Touichirou Suzuki with their top agents battle Mob and his friends. While Teru and Ritsu fight against the Scars, Mob is stressed whether to use his psychic powers to save his friends or to run away as advised by Reigen. Reigen eventually calms him and accidentally absorbs his powers to take over the fight against the Scars.

Mob, showing his kindness to Toichiro, redirects the power into his body, leading to a seemingly smaller explosion that keeps the city safe. In the aftermath, Toichiro admits his mistake and allows himself to be taken into custody, after apologizing to Sho. On television, it is shown that the apparent huge explosion actually caused the sudden growth of the broccoli seed that Mob kept in his shirt pocket, forming the Divine Tree.

The broccoli tree's power is absorbed by Dimple to fulfill his wish to become a god. Having heard of this Mob convinces Dimple to stop with what he is doing, and refrains from using his psychic powers during their talk. After learning Tsubomi would leave school, Mob decides to confess his love to her but nearly dies on the way in an accident. This causes the return of ???% who starts destroying the city. As his friends fail to save, Mob's consciousness manages to contact ???% who reveals himself as Mob's suppressed emotions. As ???% reveals he fears to confront Reigen as he knows he is just using them for his own personal benefit, Mob is confronted by Reigen. Reigen confesses to Mob that he has been using him but still believes none of them are special just for having different skills. This causes Mob to accept himself and absorb with ???% After recovering his persona, Mob confesses his feelings to Tsubomi but is rejected. In the ending of the series, Shigeo becomes vice-president of the Body Improvement Club, where he first welcomes new students. Then, he walks with Ritsu and Teruki to Reigen's birthday party showing that he is now in control of his emotions and powers.

=== Original video animations ===
In the Mob Psycho 100 first original video animation, Mob and his friend help Reigen write a book involving his life and accomplishments. With his crowd funding campaign only receiving 2500 yen (which were Reigen's own), he uses the money to treat Mob to ramen.

In the second original video animation, Mob joins his friends to help Reigen with a job in the hot springs. They are encouraged by the head of the springs to take it easy for the day, where they learn of the spirit Ihoben, famous for blocking the entrance to a parallel world where they are. Reigen desperately tries to figure out what is up in the other dimension but finds himself stuck in a never-ending loop on the train, while Serizawa learns he can travel in and out with ease. After many days trapped alone on the train, with it being just a few hours in the real life, Reigen figures out what Serizawa has been doing and gets him to bring Mob and the others to help.

== Reception ==
=== Popularity ===
Mob's character has been popular. Otakuzine Anime Magazine listed Mob as one of the best exorcist in anime history, comparing how his powers contradict his weak personality. In a Gin-Iro-Neko Tea Salon in Ginza during 2020, tea was served with Mob's image. Comic Book Resources also listed Mob as one of the best psychics in anime due to the potential of his powers. At the Crunchyroll's inaugural Anime Awards in 2017, Mob's battle against Koyama received the award for Best Fight Scene, while he was nominated for Hero of the Year; Mob and the character's voice actor Kyle McCarley, were nominated for Best Boy and Best Voice Artist Performance (English) categories at the fourth edition in 2020, respectively; Mob was nominated for Best Main Character at the eighth edition in 2024.

=== Critical reception ===
Mob's character has often been the subject of positive response by journalists for manga and anime. Den of Geek stated that he might come across as the standard anime hero due to the concept involving his powers, he subverts expectations as he spends most of his screentime rejecting his powers and instead working out to improve his physical condition and be more popular. The fact that his emotional state change when dealing with experiences was also noted to stand out in the series and felt that his mentor Reigen was nearly his opposite.

The fight sequences of the manga proper choreography and that the anime instead improved them. On the other hand, Lauren Orsini commended the coming-of-age story of Mob. The performances of Setsuo Itō and Kyle McCarley were praised by Anime News Network for giving their own take on the protagonist. Manga.Tokyo also praised Ito's work as the writer was shocked by Bones' decision to cast relatively newcomer actor for the protagonist in contrast to the rest of the series' cast. Reviewers also commented on Mob's relationship with Reigen. Otaku USA also liked Mob's powers and how much build up the narrative gives to each encounter he has. The same site contrasted him with his predecessor Saitama due to how the humor often relies on Mob's social life but Reigen's antics manages to balance the series' comedy. Espinof found Mob easily likable due to how he deals with comical cases with Reigen and how across each episode he matures. The fight scenes he is involved were often praised too due to how well they are directed by Bones. Anime UK News also found several differences between Mob and Saitama despite their similar designs created by One as they noted the two protagonists do different things with their powers. On a more negative point, Anime UK News felt that the supporting cast, most notably Reigen, was more interesting than Mob. Nevertheless, the way the series explores Mob's and Reigen's relationship was also the subject of praise due to their caring natures and how honest the former comes across.

Critics also focused on Mob's growth. In a feature article of the series, Otaku USA said that Mob's character carries several lessons aimed towards the viewers such as dealing with his emotions, appreciating their own worths, among others. Anime News Network also praised the growth of Mob in the second season. By the end of the anime's second season, IGN wrote that the series has been developing Mob's personality across each arc with his own powers leading to a comical way to start the third season: knowing what to do when graduating. IGN praised this story for giving the protagonist ideas with what to do with his life while also generating commentary about identity crisis with jokes included. Comic Book Resources also found Mob's story in the third season appealing due to how he is only concerned about helping his school while Reigen and other characters are facing spirits.

=== Cultural impact ===
In September 2020, the series went viral after American businessman Eric Trump, son of then-and-future-President Donald Trump, published a tweet connecting the series to allegations of censorship by Google, due to Google Search results for "mob" showing Mob's face rather than a group of people.
