= Kyle McCarley =

American voice actor

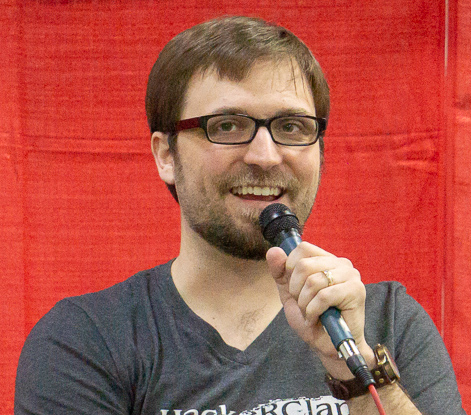
- McCarley in 2019
- Born: Chicago, Illinois, U.S.
- Education: University of Southern California School of Theatre (BA)
- Occupation: Voice actor
- Years active: 2015–present
- Spouse: Katelyn Gault
- Website: kylemccarley.com

Kyle McCarley is an American voice actor known for his work in video games and anime. In anime, he is known as the voice of Shigeo Kageyama from Mob Psycho 100, Mikazuki Augus from Mobile Suit Gundam: Iron-Blooded Orphans, Shinji Matou from Fate/stay night: Unlimited Blade Works and Fate/stay night: Heaven's Feel, Koku from B: The Beginning, Red Son from Lego Monkie Kid, Ryota Watari from Your Lie in April, Killy from Blame, Narancia Ghirga from JoJo's Bizarre Adventure: Vento Aureo, Joe Shimamura from Cyborg 009: Call of Justice and Helbram from The Seven Deadly Sins. In video games, he is known for his performances as lead characters 9S from Nier: Automata, Zeroken from Disgaea 5, Alm in Fire Emblem Echoes: Shadows of Valentia, Gatekeeper in Fire Emblem: Three Houses, Harry Potter in Harry Potter: Wizards Unite and the comedic role of Doi in Hi Score Girl and as his role as Wizard Cookie in Cookie Run: Kingdom.

His roles in Western animation include Marc Anciel from Miraculous: Tales of Ladybug & Cat Noir, Simon Laurent from Infinity Train, and Dev Dimmadome from The Fairly OddParents: A New Wish.

== Personal life ==
McCarley is married to Katelyn Gault, who is a voice actress that made her debut in Little Witch Academia.

=== Crunchyroll controversy ===
In September 2022, McCarley's contract to voice Shigeo Kageyama, the protagonist of Mob Psycho 100, was not renewed by Crunchyroll. McCarley, who is a member of SAG-AFTRA, had offered to work on a non-union contract for the third season, on the condition that Crunchyroll meet with SAG-AFTRA representatives to discuss potential future contracts. Crunchyroll refused the offer, sparking criticism from anime fans and media outlets. Despite the controversy, Crunchyroll continued with their simulcast strategy of releasing Mob Psycho 100 III dubbed episodes on the same day as the subtitled release with little marketing or advanced notice beforehand.

== Filmography ==
=== Animation ===
List of voice performances in animation
| Year | Title | Role | Notes | Source |
|---|---|---|---|---|
| 2018–2019 | Miraculous: Tales of Ladybug & Cat Noir | Marc Anciel/Rooster Bold | Supporting role | Season 2-3 only |
| 2020 | Infinity Train | Simon Laurent | 12 episodes | |
| 2020 | The Idhun Chronicles | Kopt | | |
| 2020–2024 | Lego Monkie Kid | Red Son | 10 episodes, 2 specials | |
| 2021 | Star Wars: Visions | Imperial Officer | Short film Lop & Ochō: English language dub | |
| 2023 | Family Guy | Harry Potter | "Adoption" | |
| 2023 | American Dad! | Billy Boyd | "Between a Ring and a Hardass" | |
| 2024 | The Fairly OddParents: A New Wish | Dev Dimmadome | | |

=== Anime ===
List of English dubbing performances in anime
| Year | Title | Role | Notes | Source |
|---|---|---|---|---|
| 2015 | Fate Stay Night: Unlimited Blade Works | Shinji Mato | TV series | |
| 2015 | The Seven Deadly Sins | Helbram | | |
| 2015 | Charlotte | Saito | | |
| 2015–16 | Durarara x2 | Aoba Kuronuma | | |
| 2015–16 | Aldnoah.Zero | Kisaki Matsuribi | | |
| 2016 | Your Lie in April | Ryōta Watari | | |
| 2016 | Bungō Stray Dogs 2 | John Steinbeck | | |
| 2016 | Cyborg 009 VS Devilman | Edward Adams | | |
| 2016 | Ajin: Demi-Human | Ikuya Ogura | 2 seasons | |
| 2016–18 | Mobile Suit Gundam: Iron-Blooded Orphans | Mikazuki Augus | 2 seasons | |
| 2016–19 | Mob Psycho 100 | Shigeo Kageyama | | |
| 2016–17 | The Asterisk War | Silas Norman | | |
| 2016–17 | Kuromukuro | Naoki Takekuma | | |
| 2017 | Little Witch Academia | Louis Blackwell | | |
| 2017 | JoJo's Bizarre Adventure | Mark | | |
| 2017 | Berserk | Judeau | | |
| 2018 | Devilman Crybaby | Ryo Asuka | | |
| 2018 | Violet Evergarden | Claudia Hodgins | | |
| 2018 | B: The Beginning | Koku | Main Role | |
| 2018 | Skip Beat | Hikaru Ishibashi | | |
| 2018 | Beyblade Burst Turbo | Suoh Genji | | |
| 2018 | Granblue Fantasy The Animation | Gran | | |
| 2018 | Fate/Extra: Last Encore | Shinji Matou | | |
| 2018 | Katsugeki/Touken Ranbu | Higekiri | | |
| 2018 | Mr. Osomatsu | Ichimatsu Matsuno | | |
| 2018 | Gundam Build Divers | Koichi Nanase / KO-1 | | |
| 2018–19 | Naruto: Shippuden | Iruka Umino | Replacing Quinton Flynn | |
| 2018–2023 | Boruto: Naruto Next Generations | Iruka Umino | | |
| 2019 | Hunter x Hunter | Pariston Hill | | |
| 2019 | Inazuma Eleven: Ares | Sonny Wright | | |
| 2019 | Ingress: The Animation | Makoto Midorikawa | | |
| 2019 | The Disastrous Life of Saiki K.: Reawakened | Kusuo Saiki | | |
| 2019 | Carole & Tuesday | Tao | | |
| 2019–2020 | JoJo's Bizarre Adventure: Golden Wind | Narancia Ghirga | | |
| 2019–2020 | Demon Slayer: Kimetsu no Yaiba | Yushiro | | |
| 2019 | Teasing Master Takagi-san | Takao | Season 2 | |
| 2020 | Marvel Future Avengers | Donnie Gill / Blizzard | | |
| 2020 | Beastars | Tem, Collot, Jinma | | |
| 2020 | Drifting Dragons | Lee | | |
| 2020 | BNA: Brand New Animal | Masaru Kusakabe | | |
| 2020 | Great Pretender | Caio Bisconti | | |
| 2020 | Re:Zero − Starting Life in Another World | Regulus Corneas | Season 2 | |
| 2021 | Kuroko's Basketball | Chichiro Mayuzumi | | |
| 2021 | Edens Zero | Jesse | | |
| 2021 | Baki Hanma | Shibukawa, Minister of Defense, Kure-chan, Kamura, Tachibana | | |
| 2021 | Cells at Work! Code Black | Red Blood Cell | | |
| 2022 | Kotaro Lives Alone | Ryota, Kotaro's Father | | |
| 2022 | Komi Can't Communicate | Hitohito Tadano | | |
| 2022 | Tiger & Bunny | Mattia Ingram | | |
| 2022 | Spriggan | Yu Ominae | | |
| 2022 | Case Closed: Zero's Tea Time | Rei Furuya | | |
| 2023 | Nier: Automata Ver1.1a | 9S | | |
| 2024 | Monsters: 103 Mercies Dragon Damnation | D.R., Master | ONA | |
| 2025 | Sakamoto Days | Kurii Ning, Ishikawa | | |
| 2025 | Übel Blatt | Koinzell | | |
| 2025 | Mobile Suit Gundam GQuuuuuuX | Char Aznable, Shirouzu | | |
| 2025 | The Summer Hikaru Died | Yoshiki Tsujinaka | | |
| 2026 | Black Torch | Reiji Kirihara, Hoodlum | | |

=== Film ===
List of English dubbing performances in films
| Year | Title | Role | Notes | Source |
|---|---|---|---|---|
| 2017 | Blame | Killy | | |
| 2017 | Cyborg 009: Call of Justice | Joe Shimamura | | |
| 2017 | Gantz: O | Joichiro Nishi | | |
| 2018 | Birdboy: The Forgotten Children | Young Police | | |
| 2018 | Fate/stay night: Heaven's Feel I. presage flower | Shinji Matou | | |
| 2018 | Sailor Moon SuperS: The Movie | Poupelin, Kurume Suuri/Mercurius (Ami's First Love) | Viz Media dub | |
| 2019 | Fate/stay night: Heaven's Feel II. lost butterfly | Shinji Matou | | |
| 2019 | I Want to Eat Your Pancreas | Takahiro | Limited theatrical release | |
| 2020 | Ni no Kuni | Dandy | | |
| 2020 | Violet Evergarden: Eternity and the Auto Memory Doll | Claudia Hodgins, Additional Voices | | |
| 2021 | Violet Evergarden: The Movie | Claudia Hodgins | | |
| 2022 | Bubble | Denki Ninja Leader | | |
| 2022 | Mobile Suit Gundam: Cucuruz Doan's Island | Hayato Kobayashi | | |
| 2024 | Ghost Cat Anzu | Policeman 2 | | |
| 2026 | Tom and Jerry: Forbidden Compass | Phoenix Master | English dub | |

=== Live action ===
List of English dubbing performances in live action series
| Year | Title | Country | Dubbed from | Role | Original actor | Source |
|---|---|---|---|---|---|---|
| 2016 | The Break | Belgium | French | Sébastian Drummer | Guillaume Kerbush | |
| 2019 | Love Alarm | South Korea | Korean | Hwang Sun-oh | Song Kang | |

=== Video games ===
List of English dubbing performances in video games
| Year | Title | Role | Notes | Source |
|---|---|---|---|---|
| 2015 | Disgaea 5 | Zeroken | | |
| 2017 | Fire Emblem Heroes | Alm, Soren, Gatekeeper | From 2017–2024 | |
| 2017 | Nier: Automata | YoRHa No.9 Type S (9S) | | |
| 2017 | Club Penguin Island | Rookie | | Tweet |
| 2017 | Fire Emblem Echoes: Shadows of Valentia | Alm | | Tweet |
| 2017 | Summon Night 6: Lost Borders | Seilong | | |
| 2018 | BlazBlue: Cross Tag Battle | Hyde Kido | | Tweet |
| 2018 | Sushi Striker: The Way of Sushido | Kojiro | | |
| 2019 | Zanki Zero: Last Beginning | Haruto Higurashi | | |
| 2019 | Harry Potter: Wizards Unite | Harry Potter | | Tweet |
| 2019 | Astral Chain | Harold 'Hal' Clark | | |
| 2019 | Fire Emblem: Three Houses | Gatekeeper | | Tweet |
| 2019 | Daemon X Machina | Jack | | Credits |
| 2019 | Shenmue III | Lan Di | | Credits |
| 2019 | Gyee | Turing | | Credits |
| 2020 | Granblue Fantasy Versus | Gran, Imperial Soldier | | |
| 2020 | 13 Sentinels: Aegis Rim | Ei Sekigahara | | Tweet |
| 2021 | Monster Hunter Rise | Buddy Handler Iori | | |
| 2021 | Nier Replicant ver.1.22474487139... | Administrator Boy (Ending E) | | |
| 2021 | Scarlet Nexus | Wataru Frazer | | |
| 2021 | Cookie Run: Kingdom | Wizard Cookie | | |
| 2021 | Tales of Arise | Ganabelt Valkyris | | |
| 2021 | Demon Slayer: Kimetsu no Yaiba – The Hinokami Chronicles | Yushiro | | |
| 2022 | Fire Emblem Warriors: Three Hopes | Gatekeeper | | |
| 2022 | River City Girls 2 | Takashi | | |
| 2023 | Fallout 76: Mutation Invasion | Rip Daring | | Tweet |
| 2023 | Fire Emblem Engage | Soren | | |
| 2023 | Like a Dragon Gaiden: The Man Who Erased His Name | Additional voices | | |
| 2023 | Granblue Fantasy Versus: Rising | Gran, YoRHa No.9 Type S (9S), Imperial Soldier | | |
| 2023 | Cookie Run: The Darkest Night | Wizard Cookie, Archer | | |
| 2024 | Like a Dragon: Infinite Wealth | Additional voices | | |
| 2024 | Granblue Fantasy: Relink | Gran | | |
| 2024 | Cookie Run: Witch's Castle | Wizard Cookie | | |
| 2024 | Arknights | Leonhardt, Logos | | |
| 2024 | The Legend of Heroes: Trails Through Daybreak | Melchior, Citizen | | |
| 2026 | Trails in the Sky 2nd Chapter | Dunan Von Auslese | | |
