= My Hero Academia (disambiguation) =

My Hero Academia (Japanese: 僕のヒーローアカデミア, Hepburn: Boku no Hīrō Akademia) is a Japanese superhero manga series written and illustrated by Kōhei Horikoshi.

My Hero Academia may also refer to:

- My Hero Academia: Smash!!, 2015 manga series
- My Hero Academia: Vigilantes, 2016 manga series
- My Hero Academia: Team-Up Missions, 2019 manga series
- My Hero Academia (TV series), anime television series
- My Hero Academia (season 1), 2016
- My Hero Academia (season 2), 2017
- My Hero Academia (season 3), 2018
- My Hero Academia (season 4), 2019–2020
- My Hero Academia (season 5), 2021
- My Hero Academia (season 6), 2022–2023
- My Hero Academia (season 7), 2024
- My Hero Academia (season 8), 2025
- My Hero Academia: Two Heroes, 2018 film
- My Hero Academia: Heroes Rising, 2019 film
- My Hero Academia: World Heroes' Mission, 2021 film
- My Hero Academia: You're Next, 2024 film

== See also ==
- My Hero (disambiguation)
