= My Hero Academia: You're Next =

2024 Japanese animated film by Tensai Okamura

- Theatrical release poster
- Kanji: 僕のヒーローアカデミア THE MOVIE ユア ネクスト
- Revised Hepburn: Boku no Hīrō Akademia za Mūbī: Yuā Nekusuto
- Directed by: Tensai Okamura
- Screenplay by: Yōsuke Kuroda
- Based on: My Hero Academia by Kōhei Horikoshi
- Produced by: Fumi Miura; Hiroya Nakata; Kensuke Kobuse; Misuzu Tsumura; Ryōta Katō; Tatsuya Saitō; Xia Na Lu; Yasutaka Hyūga
- Starring: Daiki Yamashita; Nobuhiko Okamoto; Yuki Kaji; Ayane Sakura; Kaito Ishikawa
- Cinematography: Mayuko Furumoto; Takashi Sawa
- Edited by: Kumiko Sakamoto
- Music by: Yuki Hayashi
- Production company: Bones
- Distributed by: Toho
- Release date: August 2, 2024 (Japan)
- Running time: 110 minutes
- Country: Japan
- Language: Japanese
- Box office: US$32.2 million

My Hero Academia: You're Next (Japanese: 僕のヒーローアカデミア THE MOVIE ユア ネクスト, Hepburn: Boku no Hīrō Akademia za Mūbī Yuā Nekusuto) is a 2024 Japanese animated superhero film based on an original story featuring the characters of My Hero Academia manga series by Kōhei Horikoshi. Produced by Bones and distributed by Toho, the film is directed by Tensai Okamura from a script written by Yōsuke Kuroda and features an ensemble cast that includes Daiki Yamashita, Nobuhiko Okamoto, Yuki Kaji, Ayane Sakura, and Kaito Ishikawa. Taking place after the U.A. Traitor arc of the manga and during the seventh season of the show, the film follows Izuku Midoriya as he faces off against Dark Might, an evil imitator of Izuku's long-admired hero All Might.

A fourth film of the franchise was announced in August 2023, with Okamura replacing Kenji Nagasaki as a director, while the rest of the staff returned from the first three films. Its full title was revealed in January 2024 along with the announcement of the release date.

My Hero Academia: You're Next premiered in theaters in Japan on August 2, 2024, and was released in the United States on October 11, 2024. The film grossed over $32 million worldwide and received positive reviews from critics.

== Plot ==
The leader of the Gollini mafia family, Valdo, watches All Might's final battle against All For One, and his final declaration of "it's your turn", dedicating himself to becoming the next "Symbol of Peace".

In the aftermath of the Paranormal Liberation War, Class 1-A (except for Yuga Aoyama) track down escaped villains. Izuku Midoriya attempts to rescue a young girl, Anna Scervino, but when he touches her, he convulses in pain. An eyepatch-wearing man with a mechanical arm, Giulio Gandini, suddenly appears and attempts to shoot Anna but is stopped by Bruno Gollini, who can create bubbles to slow down time.

A flying yacht appears, carrying the rest of the Gollini family, including Valdo, who physically resembles the real All Might. After touching Anna, Valdo uses his enhanced Quirk to consume everything in the vicinity, including Class 1-A, transforming the yacht into a massive fortress. Valdo then contacts All Might at U.A. to inform him of his plans to "save Japan", with All Might denouncing him; in response, Valdo dubs himself "Dark Might".

Class 1-A is separated, and Izuku ends up in a mountain area after his Quirk suddenly stops working. He encounters Giulio, who fights off assailants before reluctantly allowing Izuku to accompany him. They enter another area, where Izuku finds the Gollini member responsible for the Quirk erasure in a dome, Paulo, and defeats him. Dark Might arrives, knocks Izuku out with incredible strength, and punishes Paulo for his failure by dropping him into a void. Giulio saves Izuku, and they head out.

They eventually make their way to a city area, where Deborah has used her Day Dream Quirk on the civilians, including most of Class 1-A, forcing them all to touch Anna, with most falling unconscious after. Izuku and Giulio are also brainwashed, but the vestiges of One For All free the hypnotized Izuku. Izuku gets Giulio to wake up as Deborah attempts to kill him using a brainwashed civilian, allowing him to break her Quirk's control over everyone. As he reunites with Anna, Giulio once again attempts to shoot her, but Izuku stops him, allowing the Gollinis to escape with her.

Giulio reveals that Anna's Quirk is "Overmodification": by touching people, she can greatly enhance their abilities, but only to certain compatible people, while others (including herself) experience intense pain. Giulio's Quirk, "Neutralization", allows him to neutralize her Quirk temporarily, which led him to be hired by the wealthy Scervino family to care for Anna. However, the mafia learned of Anna's Quirk, murdered the entire family and kidnapped Anna. Giulio further reveals that Anna's Quirk will reach Quirk Singularity after overuse and that his own Quirk has been rendered unusable after losing his right arm during the Gollinis' attack. Giulio has to fulfill his promise to Anna years ago: to kill her if her Quirk goes out of control. Izuku and Class 1-A firmly believe there is a way to save her as they prepare a counterattack.

While Class 1-A fights against monsters created by the fortress and helps the civilians evacuate, Izuku, Katsuki Bakugo, Shoto Todoroki, and Giulio confront Dark Might and rescue Anna. Meanwhile, the fortress makes its way toward U.A., so the Heroes fend off the fortress while rescuing the escaping people. While Bakugo and Shoto deal with two Gollinis, Izuku and Giulio make it to Dark Might, who uses his enhanced "Alchemy" Quirk to simulate All Might's attacks and overwhelms Izuku; Deborah uses Anna to attempt to kill Giulio, but Giulio manages to defeat her again. Eventually, Izuku is joined by Bakugo and Shoto, and the three defeat Dark Might, revealing his true face.

However, Anna's Quirk begins to go berserk, causing the fortress to deteriorate, and Dark Might becomes monstrous. Giulio helps Anna while the three students defeat Dark Might, with Izuku using his ultimate Smash to destroy the fortress. Giulio is revealed to be compatible with Anna, causing her Quirk to overload his Neutralization, rendering her Quirkless. As everyone recovers, Giulio tells Anna he no longer needs to watch over her. Anna convinces Giulio to stay with her now that she is free.

Elsewhere, All For One, who has escaped from Tartarus, waits patiently as Tomura Shigaraki reawakens.

== Voice cast ==
Character	Japanese	English
Izuku Midoriya / Deku	Daiki Yamashita; Akeno Watanabe (child)	Justin Briner; Lara Woodhull (child)
Katsuki Bakugo / Dynamight	Nobuhiko Okamoto	Clifford Chapin
Shōto Todoroki / Shōto	Yuki Kaji; Kei Shindō (child)	David Matranga; Mikaela Krantz (child)
Ochaco Uraraka / Uravity	Ayane Sakura	Luci Christian
Fumikage Tokoyami / Tsukuyomi	Yoshimasa Hosoya	Jessie James Grelle
Tenya Īda / Ingenium	Kaito Ishikawa	J. Michael Tatum
Momo Yaoyorozu / Creati	Marina Inoue	Colleen Clinkenbeard
Eijiro Kirishima / Red Riot	Toshiki Masuda	Justin Cook
Mina Ashido / Pinky	Eri Kitamura	Caitlin Glass
Tsuyu Asui / Froppy	Aoi Yūki	Monica Rial
Minoru Mineta / Grape Juice	Ryō Hirohashi	Brina Palencia
Denki Kaminari / Chargebolt	Tasuku Hatanaka	Kyle Phillips
Kyōka Jirō / Earphone Jack	Kei Shindō	Trina Nishimura
Hanta Sero / Cellophane	Kiyotaka Furushima	Christopher Bevins
Toru Hagakure / Invisible Girl	Kaori Nazuka	Felecia Angelle
Mashirao Ojiro / Tailman	Kosuke Miyoshi	Mike McFarland
Mezo Shoji / Tentacole	Masakazu Nishida	Ian Sinclair
Rikido Sato / Sugarman	Toru Nara	Cris George
Koji Koda / Anima	Takuma Nagatsuka	Greg Ayres
Toshinori Yagi / All Might	Kenta Miyake	Christopher Sabat
Enji Todoroki / Endeavor	Tetsu Inada	Patrick Seitz
Keigo Takami / Hawks	Yuichi Nakamura	Zeno Robinson
Mirio Togata / Lemillion	Tarusuke Shingaki	Ricco Fajardo
Tsunagu Hakamada / Best Jeanist	Hikaru Midorikawa	Micah Solusod
Dark Might / Valdo Gollini	Kenta Miyake	Christopher Sabat
Giulio Gandini	Mamoru Miyano	Mauricio Ortiz-Segura
Anna Scervino	Meru Nukumi	Kayli Mills
Deborah Gollini	Minako Kotobuki	Corey Pettit
Kamile Gollini	Yūki Ono	Randy Pearlman
Ugo Gollini	Ken Uo	Barry Yandell
Paulo Gollini	Yūsuke Kobayashi	Reagan Murdock
Simon Gollini	Michitake Kikuchi	Cody Savoie
Bruno Gollini	Masaki Terasoma	Jeff Plunk
Ken Ishiyama / Cementoss	Kenta Ōkuma	Chris Rager
Rumi Usagiyama / Mirko	Sayaka Kinoshita	Anairis Quiñones
Yu Takeyama / Mt. Lady	Kaori Nazuka	Jamie Marchi
Ryuko Tatsuma / Ryukyu	Kaori Yagi	Katelyn Barr
Shinya Kamihara / Edgeshot	Kenta Kamakari	John Burgmeier
Yoichi Shigaraki	Sōichirō Hoshi	Stephen Fu
Daigoro Banjo	Hiroki Yasumoto	Andrew Love
En Tayutai	Tetsuya Kakihara	Davon Oliver
Nana Shimura	Mie Sonozaki	Stephanie Young
Nezu	Yasuhiro Takato	Jerry Jewell

== Production ==
In August 2023, a stage event for the anime's sixth season announced that a fourth film was in production. In December 2023, the Jump Festa '24 event announced that the film was planned for a "Q3 2024" release, with Kōhei Horikoshi responsible for general supervisor and original character design. In January 2024, the title and release date were revealed as well as the staff with Tensai Okamura replacing Kenji Nagasaki as director, while the returning staff includes Yōsuke Kuroda as writer, and Yoshihiko Umakoshi as character designer. On April 6, 2024, it was announced that Kenta Miyake who voiced All Might, had been cast as Dark Might. On May 30, 2024, Mamoru Miyano and Meru Nukumi had been cast as original characters Giulio Gandini and Anna Scervino respectively. The cast of the original villain characters as the members of Gorrini Family were revealed in July 2024, including Ken Uo as Hugo, Yūki Ono as Kamil, Minako Kotobuki as Deborah, Yūsuke Kobayashi as Paulo, Michitake Kikuchi as Simon, and Masaki Terasoma as Bruno.

== Music ==
Yuki Hayashi was revealed to be composing the film in January 2024, after previously doing so for My Hero Academia anime series and the franchise's films Two Heroes, Heroes Rising, and World Heroes' Mission. In June 2024, Vaundy was revealed to be performing the theme music for the film titled "Homunculus" (ホムンクルス). In August 2024, he also revealed to be performing its ending theme song titled "Gift". The film's soundtrack was released in Japan by Toho Animation Records on August 7, 2024.

== Marketing ==
A teaser trailer and the visual for the untitled fourth film were revealed in August 2023. A full trailer and the key visual for My Hero Academia: You're Next were released in January 2024. A teaser trailer featuring the villain Dark Might was released in April 2024. The character visuals for the film's original characters were released in June 2024. In the same month, a new trailer and key visual were revealed. A one-shot spin-off chapter written and illustrated by Yōkō Akiyama, titled Connect to the Day, was published in Weekly Shōnen Jump on July 29, 2024. It takes place before the Final War, centered on Class 1-A students during their mission to capture the Jailbreakers.

A bonus manga by Horikoshi titled My Hero Academia Vol. Next was given to the first 1.5 million people who viewed the film in theaters in Japan. It also contained a special one-shot manga, titled A Piece of Cake, which was later published by Viz Media digitally in October 2024. A novel based on the film written by Anri Yoshi was published in Japan by Shueisha on August 2, 2024.

Promotional partners for the film included the latte cafe store Anicafe Gratte, the pizza delivery chain Pizza-La, the sushi restaurant chain Kura Sushi, and the bento take-out chain Hokka Hokka Tei.

== Release ==
=== Theatrical ===
My Hero Academia: You're Next was released in Japan on August 2, 2024, and received 4D screenings across 136 theaters in the same day it released. The film held its American premiere at Beyond Fest in Los Angeles on October 6, 2024. It was also screened in the United States by Toho International on October 11, 2024. In September 2024, Crunchyroll and Sony Pictures announced that they had acquired the select international theatrical rights to the film through October.

=== Home media ===
My Hero Academia: You're Next was released on Blu-ray and DVD in Japan on February 19, 2025. The deluxe "Plus Ultra" edition contains an original video animation based on the bonus manga chapter "A Piece of Cake", and follows Deku, Bakugo, and the rest of Class 1-A prior to the film's storyline. The film was released on Blu-ray in the United States and Canada by Toho on April 1, 2025, and in the United Kingdom by Crunchyroll on November 24. Netflix and Crunchyroll began streaming the film on April 20, 2025.

== Reception ==
=== Box office ===
My Hero Academia: You're Next grossed $5 million in Japan and $27.2 million in other territories, for a worldwide total of $32.2 million. It is the tenth highest-grossing domestic film of 2024 in Japan.

The film debuted at first in the Japanese box office, and earned ¥895 million ($6.28 million) in its first three days. It dropped to third in its second weekend after earning ¥346 million ($2.32 million) on weekends. The film grossed over ¥2.38 billion ($16.42 million) from 1.65 million tickets sold, and remained third with ¥313 million ($2.16 million) during its third weekend. It dropped to sixth in its fourth weekend with $1.12 million. It rose to fourth in its fifth weekend with $1.04 million, but it fell to seventh in its sixth weekend after earning $538,000. The film remained seventh in its seventh weekend with $726,300. It grossed over ¥3.52 billion ($23.5 million) in its tenth weekend, surpassing My Hero Academia: World Heroes' Mission as the highest-grossing film of the franchise.

In the United States, the film made $1.36 million from 1,845 theaters on its first day, and $952,000 on its second. It went on to debut to $3 million in its opening weekend, finishing eighth. It dropped out of the ranking in its second weekend after earning $687,587.

=== Critical response ===
On the review aggregator website Rotten Tomatoes, the film holds an approval rating of 95% based on 19 reviews. American audiences surveyed by CinemaScore gave the film an average grade of "A−" on an A+ to F scale, while those polled by PostTrak gave it an 83% overall positive score, with 64% saying they would definitely recommend it.

Richard Eisenbeis of Anime News Network graded the film a B−, praising its animation, visuals and music while criticizing the plot and characters, stating that "even though the stakes are low and there are no giant explosions, blood, or tears, watching Deku take out a group of small-time villains using all his different powers makes him feel like the Superman proxy he's supposed to be." IndieWire's David Opie also gave the film a B−, noting that "everything is so well choreographed and stylized that you never lose track of what's happening." He praised its villains that varied in terms of "character design and their impact on the story", but felt the missed opportunity of leaving All Might almost entirely out of the fight in which Dark Might inspired as Deku's new villain.

Writing for Den of Geek, Daniel Kurland rated the film 3 out of 5 stars, praising it for the visuals throughout the film's action sequences that "helps accentuate its excellent battle choreography and inspired Quirk combinations and counters." Despite criticizing its characters, plot and themes, he concludes that "[the film] is still an exceptional anime movie that deserves to be seen on the big screen. [...] Those who are looking for flashy action sequences, beautifully-animated superpower spectacles, and rewarding character moments will leave You're Next satisfied." Abhishek Srivastava of The Times of India gave the film 3.5/5 stars, saying: "With a well-paced narrative that balances action and comedy, the film ensures an engaging ride for both long-time fans and newcomers alike."

=== Accolades ===
In December 2024, My Hero Academia: You're Next was among the Top 100 Favorites nominated for the Anime of the Year at the Tokyo Anime Award Festival 2025. It was also nominated for Film of the Year at the 9th Crunchyroll Anime Awards in 2025.
