= My Hero Academia: Two Heroes =

2018 Japanese animated film by Kenji Nagasaki

- Theatrical release poster
- Kanji: 僕のヒーローアカデミア THE MOVIE 〜2人の英雄(ヒーロー)〜
- Revised Hepburn: Boku no Hīrō Akademia za Mūbī: Futari no Hīrō
- Directed by: Kenji Nagasaki
- Screenplay by: Yōsuke Kuroda
- Based on: My Hero Academia by Kōhei Horikoshi
- Produced by: Kazuki Okamura; Kazumasa Sanjo; Koji Nagai; Yoshihiro Ozabu
- Starring: Daiki Yamashita; Kenta Miyake; Mirai Shida; Katsuhisa Namase; Nobuhiko Okamoto; Ayane Sakura; Kaito Ishikawa; Yuki Kaji; Marina Inoue; Toshiki Masuda; Ryō Hirohashi; Tasuku Hatanaka; Kei Shindō; Rikiya Koyama
- Cinematography: Masataka Ikegami
- Edited by: Kumiko Sakamoto
- Music by: Yuki Hayashi
- Backgrounds by: Shigemi Ikeda
- Production company: Bones
- Distributed by: Toho
- Release dates: July 5, 2018 (Los Angeles Convention Center); August 3, 2018 (Japan)
- Running time: 97 minutes
- Country: Japan
- Language: Japanese
- Box office: US$33.4 million

My Hero Academia: Two Heroes (Japanese: 僕のヒーローアカデミア THE MOVIE 〜2人の英雄(ヒーロー)〜, Hepburn: Boku no Hīrō Akademia za Mūbī: Futari no Hīrō) is a 2018 Japanese animated superhero film based on an original story featuring the characters of My Hero Academia manga series by Kōhei Horikoshi. Produced by Bones and distributed by Toho, the film is directed by Kenji Nagasaki from a script written by Yōsuke Kuroda and features an ensemble cast that includes Daiki Yamashita, Kenta Miyake, Mirai Shida, Katsuhisa Namase, Nobuhiko Okamoto, Ayane Sakura, Kaito Ishikawa, Yuki Kaji, Marina Inoue, Toshiki Masuda, Ryō Hirohashi, Tasuku Hatanaka, Kei Shindō, and Rikiya Koyama. In the film, taking place between the Final Exams and the Forest Training Camp story arcs of the manga, Izuku Midoriya / Deku accompanies Toshinori Yagi / All Might in visiting his old friend at I-Island when Villains attack the artificial moving island.

A film of the franchise was announced in December 2017, with Nagasaki, Kuroda, and Yoshihiko Umakoshi confirming a few days later their return from My Hero Academia anime television series to direct the film, write the script, and design the characters, respectively. Original characters in the film were announced in April and June 2018.

My Hero Academia: Two Heroes premiered in Los Angeles on July 5, 2018, and was released in Japan on August 3, with a limited release in the United States and Canada from September 25 to October 2. The film grossed $33.4 million worldwide with positive reviews from critics. It won the Crunchyroll Anime Award for Best Film, and received nominations at the IGN Awards and Newtype Anime Awards. It was followed by three films: My Hero Academia: Heroes Rising (2019), My Hero Academia: World Heroes' Mission (2021), and My Hero Academia: You're Next (2024).

== Plot ==
In the past, a young All Might, while as an exchange student in California, deals with a group of villains who have robbed a casino. He is aided by his classmate and friend, David Shield, who eventually becomes a scientist and works with him to design many of his suits.

In the present, during his summer break, All Might brings Izuku Midoriya with him to I-Island, a floating city island, in response to an invitation from David's daughter, Melissa, to surprise her father. During their reunion, David runs a test with All Might and learns that his Quirk is nearly depleted, becoming horrified as he believes that All Might will no longer be able to fulfill his role as the Symbol of Peace. Meanwhile, Melissa shows Izuku around the island and unexpectedly encounters Izuku's classmates from Class 1-A, who have all been invited to the island for various reasons. After enjoying the island's events, Melissa invites them to a formal party being held with all the Heroes present. Prior to the party, Melissa confesses to Izuku that she is Quirkless, a revelation that astonishes him due to him also originally being Quirkless. She then presents him with a "Full Gauntlet", a mechanical arm device that enables him to harness the full potential of his Quirk without suffering any harm.

Meanwhile, Wolfram, a terrorist villain who had secretly arrived on the island, takes control of the island's security system during the party and threatens to kill its residents. He restrains all of the attending Heroes, including All Might, and takes David and his assistant, Samuel Abraham, hostage to break into the island's vault. Izuku, Melissa, and some of Class 1-A at the party manage to evade the attackers, and they decide to save the hostages by reaching the top of the building and deactivating the security system. Discovering their presence, Wolfram deploys enemy forces to stop them, forcing the group to be split up as they deal with the Villains and security bots. Eventually, Izuku and Melissa are the only ones left who manage to climb to the top.

At the top of the tower, they discover that David and Samuel orchestrated the night's events. They had hired fake Villains to cause a distraction in order to retrieve their greatest invention – a headset that maximizes the power of a person's Quirk – which had been confiscated and sealed away by the project's sponsors. David wishes to give it to All Might so that he can maintain his role as the Symbol of Peace. However, Wolfram arrives and reveals that he is a real Villain, hired by Samuel to retrieve the headset for himself. He steals it and attempts to kill Samuel and Melissa, but David and Izuku save them. Wolfram holds off Izuku, kidnaps David, and escapes to the rooftop. Izuku fails to prevent Wolfram from taking off in a helicopter with David, but Melissa takes control of the security system and frees the Heroes. All Might reaches the roof and stops the helicopter from escaping.

Wolfram then uses the Quirk Amplification Device to amplify his power, creating a giant metal body with David trapped inside. He overpowers All Might and reveals that he'd also been given an additional Quirk by All Might's arch-nemesis, All For One, who wanted to be involved to demoralize All Might. With All Might lacking the strength to defeat Wolfram alone, Izuku comes in to aid him. The rest of the students soon arrive to assist in their fight, as All Might and Izuku combine their One For All's to defeat Wolfram and free David. As the students celebrate their victory, All Might and David reflect on the people, such as Izuku and Melissa, becoming the next generation of Heroes, and how the world will be in safer hands even after All Might's Quirk is gone.

== Voice cast ==
| Character | Japanese | English |
|---|---|---|
| Izuku Midoriya / Deku | Daiki Yamashita | Justin Briner |
| Toshinori Yagi / All Might | Kenta Miyake | Christopher Sabat |
| Melissa Shield | Mirai Shida | Erica Mendez |
| Katsuki Bakugo / Dynamight | Nobuhiko Okamoto | Clifford Chapin |
| Shōto Todoroki / Shōto | Yuki Kaji | David Matranga |
| Ochaco Uraraka / Uravity | Ayane Sakura | Luci Christian |
| Tenya Īda / Ingenium | Kaito Ishikawa | J. Michael Tatum |
| Eijiro Kirishima / Red Riot | Toshiki Masuda | Justin Cook |
| Minoru Mineta / Grape Juice | Ryō Hirohashi | Brina Palencia |
| Denki Kaminari / Chargebolt | Tasuku Hatanaka | Kyle Phillips |
| Momo Yaoyorozu / Creati | Marina Inoue | Colleen Clinkenbeard |
| Kyōka Jirō / Earphone Jack | Kei Shindō | Trina Nishimura |
| Hanta Sero / Cellophane | Kiyotaka Furushima | Christopher Bevins |
| Rikido Sato / Sugarman | Tōru Nara | Cris George |
| Mezo Shoji / Tentacole | Masakazu Nishida | Ian Sinclair |
| Fumikage Tokoyami / Tsukuyomi | Yoshimasa Hosoya | Jessie James Grelle |
| Mina Ashido / Pinky | Eri Kitamura | Caitlin Glass |
| Tsuyu Asui / Froppy | Aoi Yūki | Monica Rial |
| Toru Hagakure / Invisible Girl | Kaori Nazuka | Felecia Angelle |
| Wolfram | Rikiya Koyama | Keith Silverstein |
| Samuel Abraham | Mitsuru Ogata | Barry Yandell |
| Zen Shigaraki / All For One | Akio Ōtsuka | John Swasey |
| Mr. Plastic | Kensuke Satō | Andrew Love |
| Electoplant | Keiji Hirai | Nazeeh Tarsha |
| Cow Lady | Tomomi Kawamura | Katelyn Barr |
| David Shield | Katsuhisa Namase Ryōhei Kimura (young) | Ray Chase |

The comedy duo Chidori make cameo appearances as themselves wearing "Plus Ultra" T-shirts at I-Island. A motif of Godzilla, called "Godzillo", also appears in the film, using its voice from the Godzilla films released by Toho in the Heisei era.

== Production ==
=== Development ===
In December 2017, Shueisha's Weekly Shōnen Jump magazine announced that an anime film of Kōhei Horikoshi's My Hero Academia manga series would premiere in summer 2018, which would be based on an original story. Horikoshi "scarcely believe[d]... [but] was super happy" in the announcement of his manga's first film, further revealing that a "character's past that hasn't been in the manga yet" would be featured. He saw the film as a "chance" to show Toshinori Yagi / All Might in his younger days since he could not bring up the story to his manga anymore yet always wanted to include a chapter in regards to the character's past.

The film's title and release date were revealed during a stage presentation at AnimeJapan in March 2018. In the same event, the film's timeline was revealed to be taking place after the Final Exam story arc and during "another summer" in the Forest Training story arc at an artificial island called I-Island. It would also tie into the twentieth episode of the television series' third season.

=== Pre-production ===
A few days after the film's announcement, Bones and Toho were also announced to be respectively producing and distributing the film, with Kenji Nagasaki directing, Yōsuke Kuroda writing the script, and Yoshihiko Umakoshi designing the characters, while Horikoshi was credited with the original work and character designs, and as the chief supervisor. Joining the returning voice actors from My Hero Academia television series in April 2018 were Mirai Shida as Melissa Shield and Katsuhisa Namase as David Shield, as did Rikiya Koyama in June 2018 as the film's villain, Wolfram.

=== Post-production ===
In an interview with Comic Natalie, Horikoshi revealed that he had a "good amount of oversight" with the film such as providing the designs of the original characters Melissa and David and offering his "opinions and corrections" to the script. The release of the 34th issue of Weekly Shōnen Jump in July 2018 revealed the addition of Ryōhei Kimura in the cast as young David. In August 2018, Funimation announced that Erica Mendez, Ray Chase, and Keith Silverstein would respectively voice Melissa, David, and Wolfram in the film's English dub.

== Music ==
Yuki Hayashi served as the film's composer. Masaki Suda performed the film's theme music titled "Long Hope Philia" (ロングホープ・フィリア, Rongu Hōpu Firia), which was written and composed by Hiromu Akita of amazarashi. The film's original soundtrack was released in July 2018 under the Toho Animation Records label.

== Marketing ==
My Hero Academia: Two Heroes released a teaser trailer in April 2018 and a new trailer in June. The film collaborated with the staff of Kyoto Tower in promoting its release. A one-shot spin-off manga illustrated by Yōkō Akiyama focusing on Melissa, titled Everyone Is Surely Someone's Hero (きっと誰もが誰かのヒーロー, Kitto Daremo ga Dareka no Hero), was published in the 35th issue of Weekly Shōnen Jump on July 30, 2018. The first one million audience members to see the film received a special book, titled Volume 0 (Origin), containing a manga by Horikoshi titled No. 0 All Might: Rising, which was later published by Viz Media digitally in September 2018, as well as character profiles and a "secret dialogue" between Horikoshi and One Piece creator Eiichiro Oda.

Promotional partners for the film included Pizza-La, FamilyMart, Teikyo University, and karaoke chains Karatetsu and Manekineko.

== Release ==
=== Theatrical ===
My Hero Academia: Two Heroes had its world premiere at Anime Expo held at the Los Angeles Convention Center in Los Angeles, California, United States on July 5, 2018. The film was released in Japan on August 3, 2018, and received 4D screenings on January 11, 2019.

The film had a red carpet premiere for its English dub at Regal Cinemas in L.A. Live on September 13, 2018, and had a wider theatrical release in more than 400 theaters in the United States and Canada from September 25 to October 2. It was extended for two days in the United States due to its popular demand, while Canada added additional screenings on October 5–11, 2018. The film also premiered at Madman Anime Festival in Melbourne on September 15, 2018, with Madman Entertainment screening a wider release on September 27 in Australia and on October 17 in New Zealand; and at Scotland Loves Anime film festival in Glasgow on October 13, 2018, with Manga Entertainment providing a wider theatrical release in the United Kingdom and Ireland on December 4.

=== Home media ===
My Hero Academia: Two Heroes was released on Blu-ray and DVD in Japan on February 13, 2019. The Blu-ray "Plus Ultra" limited edition contains an original video animation of No. 0 All Might: Rising manga and a newly recorded picture drama of the barbeque scene shown in the film's end credits. "Plus Ultra" sold 10,603 units which topped the charts on its release week, while the DVD sold 7,387 units which ranked second in its first week of release. The Blu-ray standard edition sold 1,279 units while the DVD sold 1,943 units on its first week of release.

Funimation released the film on Blu-ray and DVD in North America on March 26, 2019, and in Australia and New Zealand on May 8; while Manga Entertainment released it on standard edition Blu-ray and DVD, as well as a limited edition SteelBook Blu-ray, in the United Kingdom and Ireland on April 8. Crunchyroll released the film along with My Hero Academia: Heroes Rising (2019) and My Hero Academia: World Heroes' Mission (2021) on a bundled Blu-ray and DVD, collectively titled My Hero Academia: 3-Movie Collection, in the United Kingdom on February 6, 2023, and is streaming it in the United States, Canada, the United Kingdom, Ireland, Australia, New Zealand, the Nordic countries, and the Caribbean region on August 17.

Bigscreen, a virtual reality theater company, made My Hero Academia: Two Heroes viewable in virtual reality headsets, which became available on pay-per-view on May 8, 2020, and later on video on demand. Netflix began streaming the film in India and the Philippines on May 15, 2021.

== Reception ==
=== Box office ===
My Hero Academia: Two Heroes grossed $14.1 million in Japan and $19.3 million in other territories, for a worldwide total of $33.4 million.

==== Japan ====
The film earned $4.49 million in its opening weekend, ranking fourth behind Incredibles 2 (2018). It dropped to seventh in its second weekend after earning $1.3 million on weekends, and fell out of the ranking in its third weekend after earning $655,000. The film was reported to have sold one million tickets in August 2018. In September 2018, the 42nd issue of Weekly Shōnen Jump magazine reported that the film grossed over ¥1.5 billion at the box office. Additional 1.3 million tickets were sold in October 2018, bringing the film's box office to ¥1.6 billion.

==== United States and Canada ====
The film grossed $2.6 million in three days since it opened on September 25, 2018, becoming Funimation's third-highest-grossing licensed film behind Your Name (2016). It outperformed other films in the top 10 per screen revenue totals, earning $1,200 on the first day and $1,400 on the second day. After a week since its release, the film grossed $5.1 million, taking the second spot from Your Name and placing behind Dragon Ball Z: Resurrection 'F' (2015). It ended its theatrical run with $5.8 million to become the tenth highest-grossing animated film in the United States and Canada at that time, replacing The Wind Rises (2013).

==== Other territories ====
My Hero Academia: Two Heroes grossed $280,650 in Australia and $42,378 in New Zealand. In Hong Kong, the film earned HK$870,000 ($111,969) in its opening weekend, entering the box office charts at ninth. In its opening weekend, the film sold 5,109 tickets in Argentina, while earning MX$6.8 million ($335,471) in Mexico, coming in eighth in those countries.

=== Critical reception ===
On the review aggregator website Rotten Tomatoes, the film held an approval rating of 100% based on 8 reviews, with an average rating of 7.5/10.

Charles Solomon of the Los Angeles Times described the film as a "high-energy blend of heroism, comedy, friendship and take-no-prisoners battles", praising Briner's dub role as Deku for "keep[ing] the character likable and believable". Writing for Den of Geek, Daniel Kurland rated the film 4 out of 5 stars, lauding it for featuring the bond between Midoriya and All Might, the former's "amicable" relationship with Melissa, and a wide range of characters that provided highlights of their powers in every scene; and finding the animation done by Bones "gorgeous". He felt that the "entertaining detour" elements provided a slice of life aspect of the franchise despite the crazy fights and described the crisis during the film as "My Hero Academia meets Die Hard".

Nick Creamer of Anime News Network graded the film "A−", lauding Horikoshi for his involvement in the film's development to "[capture] the tone and worldview of [his] world" and the film's delivery of the "strong action and character of its source material"; and feeling impactful on its theme of "heroism as a force that inspires others in terms of generational inheritance". Cold Cobra of Anime UK News scored the film 9 out of 10, praising its "beautiful and fluid" animation and "jaw-dropping" final action sequence. However, he noted how the story might not be mentioned in succeeding episodes of My Hero Academia television series despite its specific timeline in the franchise and found the villain a "bit one-note". Miranda Sanchez gave the film 7.7 out of 10 for IGN, praising it as enjoyable but criticizing the lack of development within the world of My Hero Academia.

=== Accolades ===
In December 2018, My Hero Academia: Two Heroes was included in the list nominated to win awards at the Tokyo Anime Award Festival 2019.

| Year | Award | Category | Nominee(s) | Result | Ref. |
|---|---|---|---|---|---|
| 2018 | IGN Awards | Best Anime Movie | My Hero Academia: Two Heroes | Nominated | |
| 2019 | Crunchyroll Anime Awards | Best Film | My Hero Academia: Two Heroes | Won | |
| 2019 | Newtype Anime Awards | Best Anime Film | My Hero Academia: Two Heroes | Nominated | |

== Manga adaptation ==
My Hero Academia: Two Heroes was adapted into a manga, which was released on May 2, 2019, by Home-sha under the Shueisha Home Comics imprint.

== Sequels ==
=== My Hero Academia: Heroes Rising ===
A second anime film, titled My Hero Academia: Heroes Rising, was released in Japan on December 20, 2019. Produced by Bones, the film was directed by Nagasaki from a screenplay written by Kuroda, with Umakoshi designing the characters. It was also released in the United States and Canada on February 26, 2020.

=== My Hero Academia: World Heroes' Mission ===
A third anime film, titled My Hero Academia: World Heroes' Mission, premiered in Japan on August 6, 2021, and was released in the United States and Canada by Funimation on October 29. Bones also produced the film with Nagasaki directing, Kuroda writing the script, and Umakoshi designing the characters.

=== My Hero Academia: You're Next ===
A fourth anime film, titled My Hero Academia: You're Next, premiered in Japan on August 2, 2024. Tensai Okamura serves as the director, Kuroda writing the script, Umakoshi designing the characters, and Horikoshi serving as its general supervisor and original character designer.
