= My Hero Academia: Heroes Rising =

2019 Japanese animated film by Kenji Nagasaki

- Japanese theatrical release poster
- Kanji: 僕のヒーローアカデミア THE MOVIE ヒーローズ: ライジング
- Revised Hepburn: Boku no Hīrō Akademia za Mūbī Hīrōzu: Raijingu
- Directed by: Kenji Nagasaki
- Screenplay by: Yōsuke Kuroda
- Based on: My Hero Academia by Kōhei Horikoshi
- Produced by: Wakana Okamura; Yoshihiro Ōyabu; Kōji Nagai; Kazumasa Sanjōba
- Starring: Daiki Yamashita; Nobuhiko Okamoto
- Cinematography: Mayuko Furumoto
- Edited by: Kumiko Sakamoto
- Music by: Yuki Hayashi
- Production company: Bones
- Distributed by: Toho
- Release date: December 20, 2019
- Running time: 104 minutes
- Country: Japan
- Language: Japanese
- Box office: US$30 million

My Hero Academia: Heroes Rising (Japanese: 僕のヒーローアカデミア THE MOVIE ヒーローズ: ライジング, Hepburn: Boku no Hīrō Akademia za Mūbī Hīrōzu: Raijingu) is a 2019 Japanese animated superhero film based on an original story featuring the characters of My Hero Academia manga series by Kōhei Horikoshi. Produced by Bones and distributed by Toho, the second film of the franchise was directed by Kenji Nagasaki from a script written by Yōsuke Kuroda and stars Daiki Yamashita and Nobuhiko Okamoto as part of an ensemble cast. In the film, Izuku Midoriya, Katsuki Bakugo, Ochaco Uraraka, and their classmates visit Nabu Island where they must save a group of islanders from a villain with an unfathomable Quirk.

A second film of the franchise was announced in March 2019, with the staff and cast from the first film returning. The film has elements to its story that were once going to be used by Horikoshi as a finale to the series. It was intended to be the last film in the series until images of a possible third film appeared online.

The film was released in Japan on December 20, 2019, and in North America on February 26, 2020. The film grossed $30 million worldwide and received positive reviews from critics. A third film, My Hero Academia: World Heroes' Mission, was released in Japan on August 6, 2021, with a fourth film, My Hero Academia: You're Next, released on August 2, 2024.

== Plot ==
The League of Villains are pursued by several Heroes while driving a truck carrying a life support capsule. Endeavor arrives and manages to destroy the truck, with the Villains revealed to be clones created by Twice as it crashes. The figure within the capsule, a villain named Nine who allowed himself to be experimented on by Daruma Ujiko, escapes during the crash and regroups with his team of villains to fulfill their dream to create a society ruled by those with strong Quirks. While Ujiko gave him a copy of All For One's Quirk, capable of acquiring eight more Quirks besides his own Weather Manipulation, Nine needs a special Cell Activation Quirk to cure himself of a terminal disease that worsened as a side-effect of his modification.

U.A. High's Class 1-A has been sent to the remote Nabu Island as part of a safety work program. Izuku Midoriya, the current wielder of One for All, meets Mahoro Shimano and her younger brother Katsuma, residents of the island. Despite some hostility from the sister, Izuku bonds with them along with his rival Katsuki Bakugo, and discover that Katsuma wishes to become a hero, although Mahoro seeks to dissuade him, fearing for his safety. Meanwhile, Mahoro and Katsuma's father is attacked by Nine's group and his Quirk is taken, but the Quirk is incompatible with Nine's blood type. Learning about the man's children on Nabu, they theorize that one of them would have the Quirk with the right blood type.

Nine's gang arrives on the island and destroy all means of escape and communication. Class 1-A learns of the invasion and split up to stop the villains and protect the island's residents. Nine finds the children and confirms Katsuma possesses the Quirk he seeks, but Izuku intervenes. Nine ends up greatly overpowering Izuku with his multitude of Quirks, even with Bakugo's help, and they are defeated. However, Nine is forced to retreat after overusing his Quirks, allowing Class 1-A to save Izuku, Bakugo, and the Shimanos. After 1-A regroups, they deduce why Nine wants Katsuma after he uses his Quirk to heal Izuku and Bakugo. They decide to prepare and fight the villains while awaiting the arrival of other Heroes.

After evacuating the islanders to a small island, the class successfully separate Nine from his gang, with them each being defeated by the students. However, Nine is successfully able to incapacitate all the remaining students, and once again overpowers Izuku and Bakugo by ingesting Quirk-empowering drug fluids, threatening to destroy the island. Seeing no other way to defeat Nine, Izuku transfers One For All to Bakugo, while he uses its leftover embers. Together, Izuku and Bakugo finally defeat Nine, with Izuku's One For All seemingly fading afterward.

As reinforcements from the mainland arrive, All Might recovers an unconscious Bakugo and Izuku, and realizes that One For All remains within Izuku, as the transfer into Bakugo was interrupted, but theorizing that the previous wielders of One For All wish for Izuku to keep it. Elsewhere, Tomura Shigaraki finds and kills the weakened Nine out of spite, vowing to do what he failed to do. With Nine's gang apprehended, the class help repair the damage done to the island before returning home. Izuku and Bakugo, who had lost the memory of wielding One For All, say goodbye to Katsuma and Mahoro, as Izuku assures Katsuma he can become a hero, just like All Might had done for him previously.

== Voice cast ==
Character	Japanese voice actor	English dubbing actor
Izuku Midoriya	Daiki Yamashita; Akeno Watanabe (child)	Justin Briner; Lara Woodhull (child)
Katsuki Bakugo	Nobuhiko Okamoto; Sachi Kokuryu (child)	Clifford Chapin; Kate Oxley (child)
Shoto Todoroki	Yūki Kaji	David Matranga
Ochaco Uraraka	Ayane Sakura	Luci Christian
Tenya Ida	Kaito Ishikawa	J. Michael Tatum
Momo Yaoyorozu	Marina Inoue	Colleen Clinkenbeard
Eijiro Kirishima	Toshiki Masuda	Justin Cook
Tsuyu Asui	Aoi Yūki	Monica Rial
Minoru Mineta	Ryō Hirohashi	Brina Palencia
Denki Kaminari	Tasuku Hatanaka	Kyle Phillips
Kyoka Jiro	Kei Shindō	Trina Nishimura
Mina Ashido	Eri Kitamura	Caitlin Glass
Fumikage Tokoyami	Yoshimasa Hosoya	Jessie James Grelle
Mezo Shoji	Masakazu Nishida	Ian Sinclair
Yuga Aoyama	Kosuke Kowano	Joel McDonald
Mashirao Ojiro	Kosuke Miyoshi	Mike McFarland
Hanta Sero	Kiyotaka Furushima	Christopher Bevins
Toru Hagakure	Kaori Nazuka	Felecia Angelle
Rikido Sato	Toru Nara	Cris George
Koji Koda	Takuma Nagatsuka	Greg Ayres
All Might	Kenta Miyake	Christopher Sabat
Shōta Aizawa	Junichi Suwabe	Christopher Wehkamp
Nezu	Yasuhiro Takato	Jerry Jewell
Recovery Girl	Etsuko Kozakura	Luci Christian
Yokumiru Mera	Masami Iwasaki	Kenny Green
Inko Midoriya	Aya Kawakami	Jessica Cavanagh
Endeavor	Tetsu Inada	Patrick Seitz
Hawks	Yuichi Nakamura	Zeno Robinson
Rock Lock	Yasuhiro Fujiwara	Gabe Kunda
Tomura Shigaraki	Kōki Uchiyama	Eric Vale
Dabi	Hiro Shimono	Jason Liebrecht
Himiko Toga	Misato Fukuen	Leah Clark
Twice	Daichi Endou	Newton Pittman
Mr. Compress	Tsuguo Mogami	Kent Williams
Spinner	Ryo Iwasaki	Larry Brantley
Daruma Ujiko	Minoru Inaba	Mark Stoddard
Mahoro Shimano	Tomoyo Kurosawa	Dani Chambers
Katsuma Shimano	Yuka Terasaki	Maxey Whitehead
Nine	Yoshio Inoue	Johnny Yong Bosch
Slice	Mio Imada	Lydia Mackay
Mummy	Kōsuke Toriumi	Brendan Blaber
Chimera	Shunsuke Takeuchi	Greg Dulcie
Mahoro and Katsuma's Father	Yasunori Matsumoto	Josh Bangle

== Production ==
On March 23, 2019, a stage event at AnimeJapan 2019 announced that a second My Hero Academia film was planned for a "winter 2019" release, with Kōhei Horikoshi responsible for supervision and original character design. On July 7, 2019, the title and release date were revealed at the "Hero Fes". event, with Horikoshi stating the film would be the last film adaptation for the series. The event also revealed that Bones would be producing the film, with Kenji Nagasaki returning as director, Yōsuke Kuroda returning as writer, Yoshihiko Umakoshi returning as character designer, and Yuki Hayashi returning as composer. On October 11, 2019, it was announced that Tomoyo Kurosawa would be joining the cast as Mahoro, and Yuka Terasaki would be voicing Katsuma. On September 26, 2019, it was announced that Mio Imada had been cast as Slice, and Yoshio Inoue had been cast as Nine. On November 11, 2019, Weekly Shōnen Jump revealed that Kohsuke Toriumi and Shunsuke Takeuchi had been cast as villains Mummy and Chimera respectively, and on December 6, 2019, it was revealed that Yuichi Nakamura would voice Hawks.

== Music ==
The film was composed by Yuki Hayashi, who previously doing so for My Hero Academia anime series and My Hero Academia: Two Heroes. In October 2019, sumika was revealed to be performing the theme song for the film titled "Higher Ground" (ハイヤーグラウンド). The film's original soundtrack was released in Japan by Toho Animation Records on December 18, 2019, and in the United States by Milan Records on July 17, 2020. Milan Records released the original soundtrack on vinyl records in the United States in October 2020.

== Release ==
=== Theatrical ===
Toho released the film theatrically in Japan on December 20, 2019. The first one million audience members to see the film received a bonus manga booklet written by Horikoshi, titled "Vol. Rising", with the booklet containing an extended interview with Horikoshi, character designs and sketches. The film also received 4D screenings across 81 theaters in Japan on January 24, 2020.

Funimation announced that it had licensed the film for English-speaking regions, and released the film in North America on February 26, 2020, in both English subtitled and dubbed formats. Manga Entertainment announced that it would release the film in the United Kingdom and Ireland, with the theatrical release from February 26 and 27, 2020 in both English subtitled and dubbed. In Australia and New Zealand, Madman Anime premiered the film at Anime Festival Sydney on March 7 and 8, 2020 in English subtitled and dubbed respectively, with a wide release on March 12, 2020. Funimation provided MX4D screenings in select theaters in the United States, and Madman provided 4DX screenings in Sydney with the English dub.

On March 3, 2021, PVR Pictures announced that the film would get a theatrical release in India on March 12, 2021.

=== Home media ===
My Hero Academia: Heroes Rising was released on Blu-ray and DVD in Japan on July 15, 2020, in a "Complete Edition", that includes new scenes not seen during the theatrical release. Then, on July 15, 2020, the North American Blu-ray was officially listed for pre-order, with a release date of October 27, 2020. The Blu-ray's "Plus Ultra" edition sold 15,000 units which topped the charts in its first week of release, while the DVD also topped the weekly chart with 8,000 units.

Manga Entertainment released the film on Blu-ray, DVD and SteelBook Blu-ray in the United Kingdom and Ireland on October 26, 2020. Crunchyroll released the film along with My Hero Academia: Two Heroes (2018) and My Hero Academia: World Heroes' Mission (2021) on Blu-ray and DVD in a single pack, collectively titled My Hero Academia: 3-Movie Collection, in the United Kingdom on February 6, 2023, and is streaming it in the United States, Canada, the United Kingdom, Ireland, Latin America, and the Caribbean region on October 18, 2024.

Netflix began streaming the film in India and the Philippines on May 15, 2021.

== Reception ==
=== Box office ===
As of March 14, 2020, My Hero Academia: Heroes Rising has grossed $13.3 million in Japan, as well as $16.7 million in the United States and Canada, for a total of $30 million worldwide.

During the opening weekend, My Hero Academia: Heroes Rising ranked third at the Japanese box office, earning ¥422 million ($3.86 million) in its first three days, ¥283 million ($2.59 million) of which during the weekend. The film remained third for the second weekend, dropped to fourth in its third week, dropped to seventh in its fourth weekend, and left the top 10 in its fifth weekend, though briefly rising to ninth in its sixth weekend before leaving the top 10 again. The film surpassed My Hero Academia: Two Heroes during its ninth weekend.

In the United States, the film made $2.47 million from 1,275 theaters on its first day (topping the box office), and $815,000 on its second. It went on to debut to $5.1 million in its opening weekend (a five-day total of $8.5 million), finishing fourth.

=== Critical response ===
On Rotten Tomatoes, the film holds an approval rating of 90% based on 41 reviews, with an average rating of 7.4/10. The website's critical consensus reads, "My Hero Academia: Heroes Rising sends fans of the saga on an exhilarating adventure that ends the series on a beautifully animated high note." On Metacritic, the film has a weighted average score of 70 out of 100, based on nine critics, indicating "generally favorable reviews". American audiences polled by PostTrak gave it an average 5 out of 5 stars, with 73% of people saying they would definitely recommend it.

Anime News Network's Richard Eisenbeis praised the setting, concept and climax, stating that the climax was "insanely impactful", though criticized the film's position in the My Hero Academia timeline, causing confusion and therefore "[draining] the film's tension". Twwk of Beneath the Tangles agreed about the confusing elements while stating that the film "may not reinvent or add anything new to the genre, but it is fun, fan-pleasing, and above all, meaningful, a heightened and focused tale infused with the characters, superpowers, and heart that series fans have come to love." Daryl Harding from Crunchyroll News praised the animation, stating "the final fight animation was some of the series' best", but criticized the side-story nature of the film, saying that "the world-ending stakes in it felt lessened" due to viewers knowing the continuity of the series.

== Sequels ==
=== My Hero Academia: World Heroes' Mission ===
A third anime film, titled My Hero Academia: World Heroes' Mission, premiered in Japan on August 6, 2021, and was released in the United States and Canada by Funimation on October 29. Bones also produced the film with Nagasaki directing, Kuroda writing the script, and Umakoshi designing the characters.

=== My Hero Academia: You're Next ===
A fourth anime film, titled My Hero Academia: You're Next, premiered in Japan on August 2, 2024. Tensai Okamura serves as the director, Kuroda writing the script, Umakoshi designing the characters, and Horikoshi serving as its general supervisor and original character designer.
