= A Place Further than the Universe =

Japanese anime television series

- Key visual

宇宙よりも遠い場所: A Story that leads to the Antarctica (Sora yori mo Tōi Basho)
- Genre: Adventure
- Created by: Yorimoi
- Manga
- Written by: Yorimoi
- Illustrated by: Meme Yoimachi
- Published by: Media Factory
- Imprint: MF Comics Alive Series
- Magazine: Monthly Comic Alive
- Original run: December 27, 2017 – February 27, 2019
- Volumes: 3
- Anime television series
- Directed by: Atsuko Ishizuka
- Produced by: Kenji Nakamoto
- Written by: Jukki Hanada
- Music by: Yoshiaki Fujisawa
- Studio: Madhouse
- Licensed by: Crunchyroll (Note: Crunchyroll at that time was owned by Otter Media, a joint venture between AT&T and The Chernin Group, when this series was licensed. However, Crunchyroll was acquired by Sony Pictures Television's Funimation Global Group in 2021 and Funimation itself was renamed to Crunchyroll the following year.); SEA: Medialink
- Original network: AT-X, Tokyo MX, BS11, MBS
- English network: SEA: Animax Asia
- Original run: January 2, 2018 – March 27, 2018
- Episodes: 13
- icon

A Place Further than the Universe (Japanese: 宇宙(そら)よりも遠い場所, Hepburn: Sora yori mo Tōi Basho) (Note: Subtitled A Story that leads to the Antarctica, also known in Japanese as Yorimoi (よりもい).) (Note: 宇宙 is normally read uchū, but in this case it is read as sora (hiragana: そら), meaning "sky", normally written with the kanji 空.) is an original Japanese anime television series produced by Madhouse. The series is directed by Atsuko Ishizuka, written by Jukki Hanada and features character designs by Takahiro Yoshimatsu. It aired in Japan between January and March 2018.

== Plot ==
Mari Tamaki is a second-year high school student who wants to make the most out of her youth but is usually too afraid to do so. One day, she meets Shirase Kobuchizawa, a girl who has been saving up to travel to Antarctica, where her mother disappeared three years ago. Joined by two other girls, Hinata Miyake and Yuzuki Shiraishi, they join an expedition headed towards the Antarctic.

== Characters ==
=== Main characters ===
Mari Tamaki (玉木 マリ, Tamaki Mari)
Voiced by: Inori Minase (Japanese); Xanthe Huynh (English)
A girl who attends Tatara West High School in Tatebayashi, Gunma. She is often called Kimari (キマリ) by her friends. She is always curious about things that she does not know. Despite her curiosity, Kimari realizes she is not living life to the fullest and seeks to make the most of her youth by going on an adventure. One day she finds a misplaced one million yen, and seeking to return the large sum of money she soon encounters the owner and high school student Shirase. Attending the same high school they become close, and Kimari is brought into Shirase's confidence regarding her plans to someday travel to Antarctica. She was impressed by Shirase's Antarctica plan and decided that they would go together, meeting her desire to enrich her youth with new experiences.
Shirase Kobuchizawa (小淵沢 報瀬, Kobuchizawa Shirase)
Voiced by: Kana Hanazawa (Japanese); Erica Mendez (English)
She is a senior high school student attending the same high school as Kimari. A shy and quiet girl, she is also the daughter of Takako Kobuchizawa, an Antarctic observation crew member who went missing during her last expedition to Antarctica. Shirase has been dreaming of going to Antarctica in search of her mother, as she believes Takako is still alive and waiting for her. Most of her classmates make fun of her by calling her the Antarctic Empress and believing that she won't make it to Antarctica. Soon she makes friends with Kimari and confides in her Antarctica travel plan. Later the two meet Hinata and Yuzuki and form a group with the goal of journeying to Antarctica.
Hinata Miyake (三宅 日向, Miyake Hinata)
Voiced by: Yuka Iguchi (Japanese); Kayli Mills (English)
A bright and friendly girl who works part-time at a convenience store near the high school where Kimari attends. She is the same age as Kimari, but she dropped out of high school and is now preparing to take a college entrance examination. Her dream is to ace the exams. She decided to join the expedition since she has two years left before taking her entrance examination, and she wanted to do something special. Prior to joining the group she watched Kimari and Shirase bond over their travel plans and became envious of both of them. However over time she comes to enjoy their company and honesty, something she found lacking in previous friend groups.
Yuzuki Shiraishi (白石 結月, Shiraishi Yuzuki)
Voiced by: Saori Hayami (Japanese); Amanda Lee (English)
She is a first-year high school student from Hokkaido, who has a calm and cool personality compared to the others. She is an actress who started in entertainment and commercials at the age of four and, due to her long business travels, has never had friends since she was a young child. She initially refused to go to Antarctica to do online streams about the trip, but later changed her mind after being convinced by Kimari, Shirase and Hinata. She is initially jealous of the other three girls friendship, but she later realizes that all of them are her best friends even though they had only known each other for less than a month.

=== Civilian Antarctic observation team ===
Gin Tōdō (藤堂 吟, Tōdō Gin)
Voiced by: Mamiko Noto (Japanese); Caitlyn Elizabeth (English)
Commander of the civilian Antarctic expedition "Antarctica Challenge". She was also a member of the previous civilian expedition.
Kanae Maekawa (前川 かなえ, Maekawa Kanae)
Voiced by: Yoko Hikasa (Japanese); Morgan Lauré (English)
A woman who serves as vice commander of "Antarctica Challenge" under Gin. She was also a member of the previous civilian expedition.
Yumiko Samejima (鮫島 弓子, Samejima Yumiko)
Voiced by: Lynn
So-called Antarctic chef who serves as the head cook of the observation team. She was also a member of the previous civilian expedition.
Chiaki Mukai (迎千秋, Mukai Chiaki)
Voiced by: Masaki Terasoma
The captain of the observation ship, the Penguin Manju Go. Assumed command of vessel at Gin's request. Previously captained an Antarctic observation team while a member of the SDF.
Toshio Zaizen (財前敏夫, Zaizen Toshio)
Voiced by: Yoshitsugu Matsuoka
Communications officer of the observation team.
Dai Himi (氷見大, Himi Dai)
Voiced by: Jun Fukushima
Station architect of the observation team.
Nobue Todoroki (轟信恵, Todoroki Nobue)
Voiced by: Kana Asumi
Geologist member of the observation team.
Yume Sasaki (佐々木夢, Sasaki Yume)
Voiced by: Aya Endō
Astronomer member of the observation team.
Honami Yasumoto (安本保奈美, Yasumoto Honami)
Voiced by: Mikako Komatsu
Microbiologist member of the observation team.

=== Other characters ===
Megumi Takahashi (高橋 めぐみ, Takahashi Megumi)
Voiced by: Hisako Kanemoto (Japanese); Daisy Guevara (English)
Kimari's childhood friend and best friend from kindergarten. She became envious of Kimari after she decided to go to Antarctica. She tries to break off their friendship but Kimari refused this and hugged her to show she still values her. They reconcile by the end of the series and Megumi goes off to the Arctic after being inspired by her friend.
Rin Tamaki (玉木 リン, Tamaki Rin)
Voiced by: Kaede Hondo (Japanese); Cassandra Lee Morris (English)
Kimari's sister who also serves as a school committee member at school. She is worried but supportive of her sister who is going to Antarctica.
Tamiko Shiraishi (白石 民子, Shiraishi Tamiko)
Voiced by: Sayaka Ohara
Mother of Shiraishi Yuzuki. She is also a manager of her daughter's works.
Takako Kobuchizawa (小淵沢貴子, Kobuchizawa Takako)
Voiced by: Ai Kayano (Japanese); Cristina Vee (English)
Shirase's mother, who disappeared during an Antarctic expedition three years ago.

=== Ship ===
Penguin Manju Go (ペンギン饅頭号)
The icebreaker carrying the crew to Antartica. It is a civilian version/interpretation of the Shirase (AGB-5003), which was actually operated by the Japan Maritime Self-Defense Force.

== Media ==
=== Anime ===
The 13-episode original anime television series by Madhouse was first announced by Kadokawa during Anime Expo 2017 in July. The series was directed by Atsuko Ishizuka with Jukki Hanada writing the scripts and Takahiro Yoshimatsu designing the characters. Yoshiaki Fujisawa composed the music. The series aired in Japan between January 2 and March 27, 2018 and was simulcast by Crunchyroll. The opening theme is "The Girls Are Alright!" by Saya, while the ending theme is "Koko Kara, Koko Kara" (ここから、ここから, From Here, From Now On) by Inori Minase, Kana Hanazawa, Yuka Iguchi, and Saori Hayami. On November 18, 2022, Anime Limited announced at Anime NYC that they will be releasing the series on a collector's edition Blu-ray. The Blu-ray release featured an English dub, produced by Studio Nano, which premiered at Anime NYC on November 19, 2022.

==== Episodes ====
No.	Title (Note: All English episode titles are taken from Crunchyroll.)	Directed by	Original release date
1	"One Million Yen For Youth"; Transliteration: "Seishun Shakuman'en" (Japanese: 青春しゃくまんえん)	Atsuko Ishizuka	January 2, 2018
Mari Tamaki, a second-year high school student who fears she has not been making the most of her youth, contemplates skipping school and going on an impulsive trip, but is too scared to go through with it. One evening, she comes across an envelope dropped by a girl, discovering it contains one million yen. The next day, Mari finds the girl who had dropped the envelope, Shirase Kobuchizawa, who had been saving up the money to travel to Antarctica and find her missing mother, Takako. Taking an interest in Antarctica herself, Mari decides to join Shirase on her journey.
2	"Kabukicho Fremantle"; Transliteration: "Kabukichō Furīmantoru" (Japanese: 歌舞伎町フリーマントル)	Tomoya Kitagawa	January 9, 2018
Needing money for a flight to Fremantle, where a civilian expedition towards Antarctica is scheduled to depart from, Mari begins working at a convenience store alongside co-worker Hinata Miyake. Having overheard Mari and Shirase's conversations, Hinata also takes an interest in going to Antarctica and joins in on Shirase's plan. Later, the girls go to Kabukichō, Tokyo to try and carry out a plan to sneak aboard the exhibition, only to get discovered by two of the team members, Kanae Maekawa and Yumiko Samejima. Despite offering the money she had saved up as sponsorship for the expedition, Shirase is unable to convince Yumiko and Kanae to let them come on the expedition, as they have their own plan to gather the funding needed.
3	"The Follow Backs Don't Stop!"; Transliteration: "Forōbakku ga Tomaranai" (Japanese: フォローバックが止まらない)	Masatoyo Takada	January 16, 2018
The girls are approached by Yuzuki Shiraishi, a child actress who had just been chosen to go on the Antarctica expedition as a reporter, who asks Shirase to go in her place. However, Yuzuki's manager and mother, Tamiko, is adamant about Yuzuki going as part of her job. As Yuzuki remains defiant, Tamiko proposes that if Shirase, Mari, and Miyake can convince Yuzuki to go on the expedition, they can accompany her. Asked why she does not want to go, Yuzuki explains how she never got to make any true friends because of her acting career, becoming surprised when Mari gives her a hug. The next day, the girls invite Yuzuki to hang out with them as proper friends, prompting her to agree to go to Antarctica as long as they come with her.
4	"Four Caterpillars"; Transliteration: "Yonhiki no Imomushi" (Japanese: 四匹のイモムシ)	Kang Tae-sik	January 23, 2018
Mari gets in trouble with her mother after she fakes her signature on a permission slip and is tasked with passing all of her tests. With the threat of studies looming, Mari and the others head to a summer training camp for the expedition, where they meet the team captain, Gin Todo. The girls first take part in a route mapping exercise where they must determine a route and place flag markers down. While spending their first night in a tent, Shirase explains how Gin went with Takako on a previous Antarctica expedition that the latter did not come home from. Early the next morning, Mari comes across Gin, who shows her the sunrise and tells her about what Takako was like.
5	"Dear My Friend"	Koji Sawai	January 30, 2018
As the Antarctica expedition draws nearer, Mari's childhood friend Megumi Takahashi starts to act jealous towards her. On the day before the expedition, Megumi tells Mari that people have been spreading rumors of her, only for Shirase and Hinata to show up and take her to karaoke to blow off some steam. Afterwards, Mari tells Megumi of how she wanted to become strong so she would not have to rely on her all the time. The next day, Megumi reveals she had been the one spreading bad rumors about Mari and Shirase, realising she had been dependent on Mari relying on her. Rejecting Megumi's request to break off their friendship, Mari joins the others as they set off on the first leg of their trip.
6	"Welcome to the Durian Show"; Transliteration: "Yōkoso Dorian Shō e" (Japanese: ようこそドリアンショーへ)	Norihiko Nagahama	February 6, 2018
As the girls arrive in Singapore for a two-day layover before boarding their connecting flight to Australia, Hinata discovers that she appears to have lost her passport. With not enough time before their next flight to obtain a new passport from the embassy, Hinata accepts that she may have to miss out on the expedition altogether, much to Shirase's objection. The next day, as the girls find themselves unable to change their tickets for a later flight, Shirase offers up the one million yen she had saved to change them to business-class tickets so they can all go together. Later that evening, however, Shirase discovers that Hinata's passport was in her purse the entire time, as she had been holding onto it for her after coming out of customs while Hinata was tying her shoe, then forgot about it. With the travel situation resolved, Mari and Yuzuki punish Shirase and Hinata for all the trouble they caused by having them eat durians.
7	"The Ship That Sees the Universe"; Transliteration: "Sora o Miru Fune" (Japanese: 宇宙を見る船)	Tomoya Kitagawa	February 13, 2018
Arriving in Fremantle, the girls tour around the expedition ship to film a report before departure. While helping out the other workers, the girls begin to worry about how understaffed the expedition is and become curious as to whether Kanae is hiding some kind of plan from them. Later that night, Shirase speaks to Gin about how Takako disappeared and their drive to go to Antarctica once more.
8	"Howling, Maddening, Screaming"; Transliteration: "Hoete, Kurutte, Zekkyōshite" (Japanese: 吠えて、狂って、絶叫して)	Masatoyo Takada	February 20, 2018
The ship finally sets off on its voyage, with Mari and the others tasked with various jobs alongside their report before training on deck to build stamina. The novelty of the journey soon wears off, however, as everyone starts feeling seasick, which only gets worse as the ship starts sailing through some fierce currents. While downhearted when comparing themselves to their more stamina-inclined shipmates, the girls cheer up when they get a first-hand taste of the waves and soon get used to riding a boat as it begins its approach towards Antarctica.
9	"Antarctic Love Story (Blizzard Arc)"; Transliteration: "Nankyoku Koi Monogatari (Burizādo-hen)" (Japanese: 南極恋物語（ブリザード編）)	Kang Tae-sik	February 27, 2018
One of the crewmates, Toshio Zaizen, reveals that he has fallen in love with Gin, asking Shirase for any information about her. Feeling that it might spice up their report, the girls decide to interview Gin to see if they can learn anything about her love life. Later, Gin, who has been worried that Shirase hates her after Takako disappeared, speaks with Shirase, who is herself conflicted about how to feel. Just then, the ship is forced to break through a large sheet of ice standing in its path, during which Gin recalls the last transmission she received from Takako. As Toshio ends up giving up on his crush, the girls finally set foot on dry land.
10	"Partial Friendship"; Transliteration: "Pāsharu Yūjō" (Japanese: パーシャル友情)	Koji Sawai	March 6, 2018
The girls arrive at the Syowa Station where they will be stationed. As everyone gets the station ready, Yuzuki, who had just been offered a role for a drama, becomes curious about what point she officially became friends with the others. As the crew enjoys a Christmas party, Yuzuki becomes further confused about what friendship means when Mari cries after she proposes having Friendship Contracts. Later that evening, Mari tells Yuzuki about how she views her friendship with Megumi before everyone shows up for a belated birthday celebration, giving Yuzuki her first birthday with friends.
11	"Bash the Drum Can"; Transliteration: "Doramukan de Buttobase!" (Japanese: ドラム缶でぶっ飛ばせ！)	Hideaki Ōba	March 13, 2018
As the girls receive video messages from their friends and families, Hinata acts strangely when some old acquaintances of hers call, after which Shirase spots her letting out her frustrations in private. Concerned about Hinata, Shirase gets caught looking at e-mail sent by Hinata's former teammates in the track club. Hinata explains that because of her talent, she was looked down upon by the third-year members, who then spread bad rumors that led Hinata to quit school. While on a mission to set up solar panels and satellite markers, Shirase manages to give Hinata some comfort over her dilemma. The next day, as the girls prepare for a live broadcast, Shirase confronts Hinata's teammates over their actions, giving Hinata some peace of mind.
12	"A Place Further Than the Universe"; Transliteration: "Sora yori mo Tōi Basho" (Japanese: 宇宙よりも遠い場所)	Tomoya Kitagawa	March 20, 2018
Shirase is unsure how to feel when she is invited to join the others on a snowcat ride to where Takako was last heard from, fearing that there will be nothing left for her once she goes. After hearing Gin's reasons for coming to Antarctica despite knowing that Takako is dead, Shirase reminds herself of the effort she put in to earn the money she saved before deciding to join the others on their mission. As the team spend the night in the middle of a blizzard, Shirase hears from Gin about Takako's final words before Mari gives her her thanks for taking her to Antarctica. Upon arriving at a site for an observatory, Mari and the others search for proof that Takako was there, managing to find a laptop belonging to her. Logging onto it, Shirase breaks into tears as it retrieves all the e-mails she had sent to Takako that never got to be read.
13	"We'll Go On Another Journey Someday"; Transliteration: "Kitto Mata Tabi ni Deru" (Japanese: きっとまた旅に出る)	Atsuko Ishizuka	March 27, 2018
With their time in Antarctica drawing to a close, the girls decide to play a game of baseball with all the team members before they leave, after which Shirase decides to cut her hair. At their farewell party, Shirase gives a speech on her thoughts on Antarctica, making a promise to come again. As the girls take their leave, Gin discovers one final e-mail in Takako's outbox addressed to Shirase containing a photo she took of the aurora australis, which the girls get to witness themselves. Upon arriving in Japan and parting ways with each other, Shirase reveals she has left her earnings in Antarctica, while Mari discovers that Megumi has gone to the Arctic.

=== Manga ===
A manga adaptation illustrated by Meme Yoimachi was serialized in Media Factory's Monthly Comic Alive manga anthology from December 27, 2017, to February 27, 2019. It was compiled into three volumes.

=== Stage play ===
A stage play adaptation was announced on January 24, 2023. It ran at the Shibuya Cultural Center Owada from May 17–21, 2023. The play was directed by Hideo Tsuchida, and is also co-written the script with Tomoharu Suzuki. The cast includes Marina Horiuchi as Mari Tamaki, Haruna Ishii as Shirase Kobuchizawa, Miyu Kishi as Hinata Miyake, and Saki Kitazawa as Yuzuki Shiraishi. Hana Taguchi plays Mari's childhood friend Megumi Takahashi, while Reina Seiji plays Mari's sister Rin Tamaki.

== Reception ==
=== Critical response ===
The anime was selected by The Verge as one of the best anime of 2018, saying that it is "genuine", and by The New York Times as the #8 International Show of the Year, with TV critic Mike Hale describing it as "a funny and moving coming-of-age story that should translate across all boundaries of age or culture." Otaku USA praised the characterization and humor and added that "directing helps a lot of the comedic timing stand out and makes some of the more familiar punchlines feel fresh".

In 2019, Crunchyroll included the anime in their "Top 25 Anime of the 2010s" list, describing it as a "heartfelt series about chasing dreams, learning to break out of self-imposed boundaries, and living a life full of adventure". IGN also listed it among the best anime of the 2010s.

=== Accolades ===
Year	Award	Category	Recipient	Result	Ref.
2018	IGN Awards	Best Anime Series	A Place Further than the Universe	Nominated	
2019	3rd Crunchyroll Anime Awards	Anime of the Year	A Place Further than the Universe	Nominated	
2019	3rd Crunchyroll Anime Awards	Best Girl	Hinata Miyake	Nominated	
2019	3rd Crunchyroll Anime Awards	Best Animation	A Place Further than the Universe	Nominated	
2019	3rd Crunchyroll Anime Awards	Best Director	Atsuko Ishizuka	Nominated	
2019	5th Anime Trending Awards	Anime of the Year	A Place Further than the Universe	Won	
2019	5th Anime Trending Awards	Best in Sceneries and Visuals	Saho Yamane	Nominated	
2019	5th Anime Trending Awards	Best in Soundtrack	Yoshiaki Fujisawa	Nominated	
2019	5th Anime Trending Awards	Best in Voice Cast	Inori Minase, Kana Hanazawa, Yuka Iguchi, and Saori Hayami	Won	
2019	5th Anime Trending Awards	Action or Adventure Anime of the Year	A Place Further than the Universe	Won	
2019	5th Anime Trending Awards	Drama Anime of the Year	A Place Further than the Universe	Nominated	
2019	5th Anime Trending Awards	Original Anime of the Year	A Place Further than the Universe	Nominated	
2020	Anime Trending Decade Awards	Anime of the Decade	A Place Further than the Universe	2nd place	
