= Kyoka Jiro =

Superhero from My Hero Academia

- My Hero Academia character
- Kyoka Jiro in her hero costume as she appears in the My Hero Academia anime
- First appearance: My Hero Academia #5, "Smashing into Academia", 4 August 2014
- Created by: Kōhei Horikoshi
- Portrayed by: Akari Kawakami
- Voiced by: Japanese: Kei Shindō; English: Trina Nishimura; Chrissy Costanza (singing, both languages)

In-universe information
- Occupation: Student; Musician; Superhero
- Nationality: Japanese
- Quirk: Earphone Jack

Kyoka Jiro (Japanese: 耳郎 響香, Hepburn: Jirō Kyōka), also known by her hero name Earphone Jack (イヤホン＝ジャック, Iyahon Jakku) is a superhero and a supporting character of the manga series My Hero Academia, created by Kōhei Horikoshi. She is a pragmatic and musical student of Class 1-A, and one of the classmates of series protagonist Izuku Midoriya.

Her superpower, or quirk, Earphone Jack, allows her to control earphone jacks attached to the end of her expendable earlobes at will. With these, she can plug into objects like walls, sense sounds and vibrations, and amplify the sounds of her heartbeat as sonic attacks with the aid of speakers on her outfit.

Jiro is voiced by Kei Shindō in Japanese, and Trina Nishimura in English, while American vocalist Chrissy Costanza provides her singing voice. Jiro has received praise from critics, and is a popular character among fans.

== Creation and concept ==
Kyoka Jiro was the first character to be created for My Hero Academia. She was conceived after series creator Kōhei Horikoshi came up with the idea of a character plugging into objects while he was listening to music with some earphones.

=== Voice actors ===
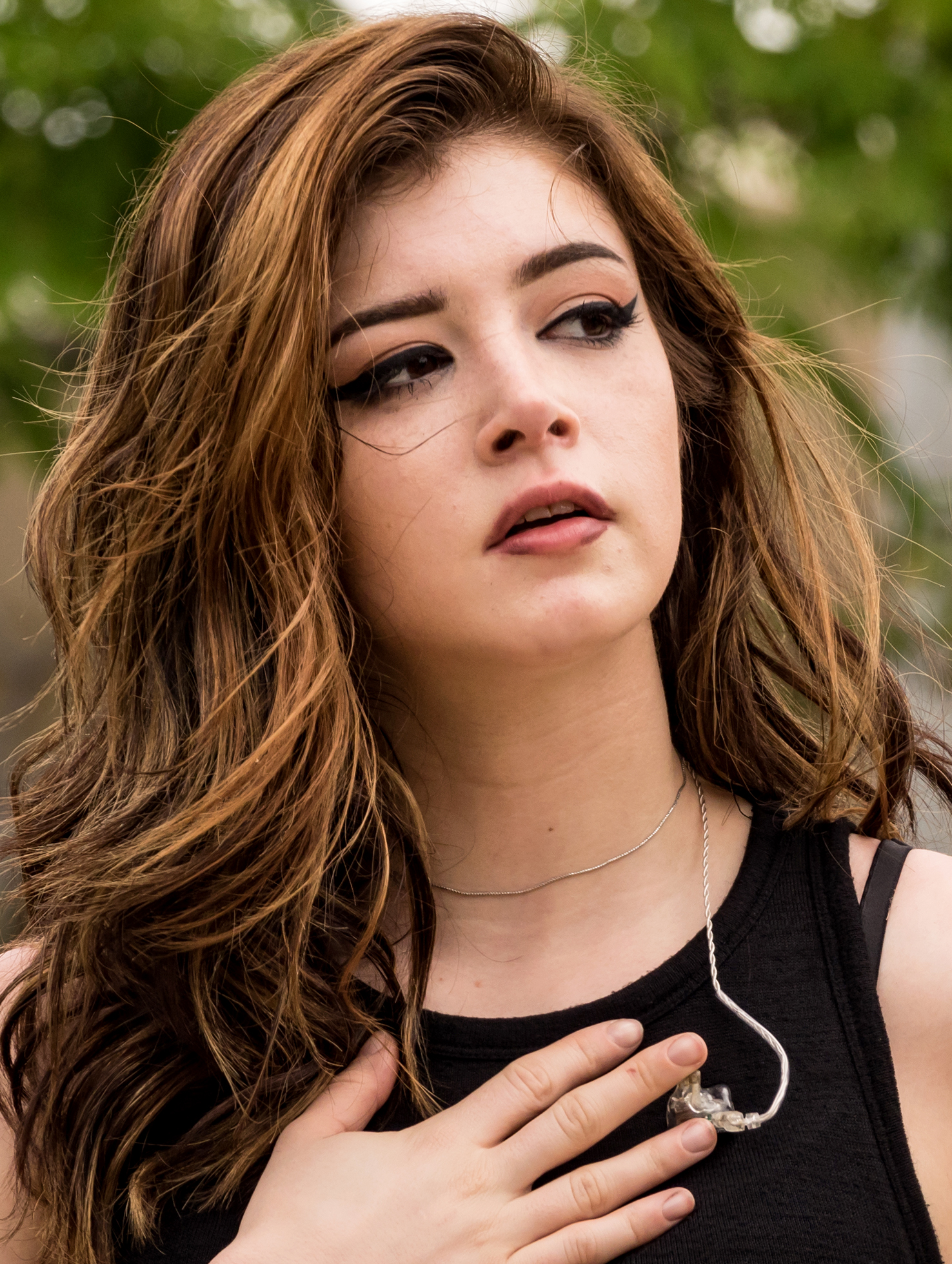
Trina Nishimura (left) voices Kyoka in My Hero Academia's English dub, while Chrissy Costanza (right) provides her singing voice.

Kyoka Jiro is voiced by Kei Shindō in Japanese and Trina Nishimura in English.

Chrissy Costanza, of American rock band Against the Current, provides Jiro's singing voice in the anime's fourth season. She provides vocals for two original songs: the acapella "Each Goal", and the power pop "Hero Too". In an interview with RockSound, Costanza recalled having to rework the translated lyrics to the songs, as they were "(...)written in Japanese and then basically interpreted into English, and some of the lyrics were just not what anyone would ever say." Costanza also remembered performing her vocals while being watched by various Japanese executives in the studio's control booth.

=== Abilities ===
Jiro's superpower, or quirk, is Earphone Jack, which is also her superhero name. Her long earlobes have earphone jacks attached to the ends, which Jiro can control at will, and which she can twirl with her fingers. Jiro can plug her ears into walls to sense sounds in other areas. Jiro can plug her earjacks into speakers on the forearms and legs of her outfit. These speakers amplify the sound of her heartbeat, which creates powerful sound waves. She can also get secret information with this power.

== Appearances ==
=== In My Hero Academia ===
Kyoka Jiro is first introduced as a fellow student of Izuku Midoriya in Class 1-A. Jiro became proficient at music as a result of her parents' influence, but instead became a superhero. She is depicted as a vocalist who plays bass guitar.

For UA's school festival, she is encouraged to become the lead vocalist and bassist for Class 1-A's musical performance. Jiro is joined by some of her classmates as bandmates: Katsuki Bakugo on drums, Momo Yaoyorozu on keyboards, and both Denki Kaminari & Fumikage Tokoyami on guitars. Performing as "A Band", and with the rest of their classmates as dancers, the group perform the original song "Hero Too" to the acclaim of those in attendance. The song also inspires Eri to smile for the first time, something she had not done in the series prior.

In the series's climax, Jiro loses part of her ear to All For One. Years after graduation, she starts a hero agency, directly neighboring that of her former classmate Denki Kaminari.

=== In other media ===
Jiro appears as a supporting character in the films My Hero Academia: Two Heroes, My Hero Academia: Heroes Rising, My Hero Academia: World Heroes' Mission, and My Hero Academia: You're Next. She appears in the video games My Hero One's Justice, My Hero One's Justice 2, and My Hero Academia: Battle for All. Akari Kawakami portrays as Jiro in the stage play.

Merchandise featuring Jiro includes figures, parkas, bags, and an electric guitar in a collaboration between My Hero Academia and ESP Guitars. She has been popular with cosplayers.

== Reception ==
Jiro is seen as a favorite by fans of the series, scoring high in popularity polls. Editors of the Japanese edition of HuffPost wrote that Kōhei Horikoshi's drawing of Kyoka Jiro and Denki Kaminari looked cute. Sam Leach of Anime News Network wrote that Jiro's room in the 51st episode was one of his favorite rooms, as it consisted of musical instruments. A writer who went by the name of Bushido Samurai on Anime Corner wrote that as of 27 December 2022, the video for "Hero Too" starring the character as the singer was viewed more than 100 million times, becoming Toho Animation's channel's most viewed video at the time. Kofi Outlaw of ComicBook.com appreciated the depiction of Jiro fighting All For One in the manga.
