= Skull-face Bookseller Honda-san =

Japanese manga and anime series

- Cover of the first manga volume

ガイコツ書店員本田さん (Gaikotsu Shotenin Honda-san)
- Genre: Comedy
- Manga
- Written by: Honda
- Published by: Media Factory
- English publisher: NA: Yen Press
- Imprint: MFC Gene Pixiv Series
- Magazine: Gene Pixiv Comic
- Original run: August 2015 – March 2019
- Volumes: 4
- Anime television series
- Directed by: Ouru Todoroki
- Written by: Shin Okashima
- Music by: Technoboys Pulcraft Green-Fund
- Studio: DLE
- Licensed by: Crunchyroll (streaming): NA: Discotek Media (home video)
- Original network: Tokyo MX, Sun TV, KBS, J:COM TV
- Original run: October 8, 2018 – December 24, 2018
- Episodes: 12

Skull-face Bookseller Honda-san (ガイコツ書店員本田さん, Gaikotsu Shotenin Honda-san; transl. "Skeleton Bookstore Employee Honda") is a Japanese comedy manga series by Honda, serialized online via Gene Pixiv Comic, the webmanga site for Monthly Comic Gene, between August 2015 and March 2019. It was collected in four tankōbon volumes by Media Factory. The manga is licensed in North America by Yen Press. An anime television series adaptation by DLE aired from October 8 to December 24, 2018.

== Plot ==
Skull-face Bookseller Honda-san is based on a real-life experience of the author Honda during their days as a bookstore employee. The story follows the life of the staff while explaining how a bookstore works.

== Characters ==
Honda (本田)
Voiced by: Soma Saito
The title character and narrator of the story, Honda is drawn with the appearance of a human skeleton wearing a book store uniform. Honda has been working at the book store for 10 years. Being in charge of foreign comics and art books (which is why the boxes containing their books are usually heavy), they are not good at speaking English and will only deal with one English word they know when dealing with foreign customers.
Kamibukuro (カミブクロ; transl. "Paper Bag")
Voiced by: Yūko Sanpei
Honda's co-worker who worked earlier before them. He is drawn with a paper bag covering his head. He is in charge of manga, including yonkoma. Among the workers at the comic section, Honda is his closest friend.
Hōtai (ホウタイ; transl. "Bandage")
Voiced by: Eri Kitamura
A worker in charge of a girls-oriented section of the store. Hōtai is drawn with bandages covering her face.
Lantern (ランタン, Rantan)
Voiced by: Kimiko Saitō
A woman who is drawn with a pumpkin head, Lantern is in charge of Shū-E-Sha books. She worked in the store earlier than Honda.
Okitsune (オキツネ)
Voiced by: Shizuka Itō
In charge of Kō-D-Sha books, Okitsune is drawn with a kitsune mask on her face.
Koomote (コオモテ)
Voiced by: Aya Endo
A worker who is in charge of novels section of the store. She is drawn with omote mask on her face.
Rabbit Head (ラビットヘッド, Rabitto Heddo)
Voiced by: Kazutomi Yamamoto
In charge of game guide books.
Fullface (フルフェイス, Furu Feisu)
Voiced by: Hiroki Yasumoto
In charge of Sho-G-Kan books, Fullface is drawn with a full face motorcycle helmet on his head.
Gas Mask (ガスマスク, Gasu Masuku)
Voiced by: Wataru Hatano
In charge of Kadokawa men's comics.
Yōsetsu Mask (溶接マスク)
Voiced by: Toshiki Masuda
Kendō (ケンドウ)
Voiced by: Koutaro Nishiyama
Armor (アーマー)
Voiced by: Akemi Okamura
The manager of the store and is in charge of the boys' love section of the store. Armor is drawn with a western war helmet on her face
Pest Mask (ペストマスク)
Voiced by: Yoko Hikasa
The Section Chief. A really kind woman drawn wearing a pest mask who gets scary when it's related to book distributors.
Azarashi (アザラシ)
Voiced by: Ayumu Murase
Editor of the work's author who actually asked to be called by "Azarashi" in Honda's comic.
Majutsushi (魔術師)
Voiced by: Ryūsei Nakao

== Anime ==
An anime adaptation aired from October 8 to December 24, 2018, on Tokyo MX and other channels with each episode running for about 15 minutes. (Note: From the TV network it lists the show at 26:30 on October 7, which is October 8, 2018 at 2:30 a.m.) It is adapted by studio DLE and directed by Owl Todoroki. Both the opening theme "ISBN~Inner Sound & book’s Narrative~" and the ending theme "Book-end, Happy-end." are written and performed by TECHNOBOYS PULCRAFT GREEN-FUND. The series aired for 12 episodes. On December 13, 2021, it was announced Discotek Media will release the anime on Blu-ray in March 2022.

=== Episode list ===
No.	Title (Note: All English titles are taken from Crunchyroll.)	Original release date
1	"The Handsome Guy is First in Line / Yaoi Girls from OVERSEAS!!!" "Otsugi de omachi no okyakusama wa ikemen / Yaoi gāruzu furomu OVERSEAS!!!" (お次でお待ちのお客様がイケメン / ヤオイガールズフロムOVERSEAS!!!)	October 8, 2018
2	"Let Me Introduce My Crazy Colleagues in This Bookstore! / Books, Written Instructions, and Me / Go! Azarashi-san" "Uriba no Ikareta Member o Shoukai Suruze! / Hon to Shijisho to Watashi / Sore Ike! Azarashi-san" (売場のイカれたメンバーを紹介するぜ！ / 本と指示書と私 / それいけ！ アザラシさん)	October 15, 2018
3	"A Battle Without Honor or Humanity / Lost in Manga" "Jingi Naki Tatakai / Manga Maigo" (仁義なき戦い / 漫画迷子)	October 22, 2018
4	"A Reception Training of Hell / Mission: An Outside Work-ish Job" "Jigoku no sekkyaku kenshū / Misshon: Gaishutsu suru kei no shigoto" (地獄の接客研修 / ミッション：外出する系の仕事)	October 29, 2018
5	"An INQUIRY / It's a Book Signing!! Everyone Gather Up / A Fascinating Erotic Story" "Otoiawase / Sainbonda yo! ! Zen'in shūgō / Ki ni naru ero no hanashi" (OTOIAWASE / サイン本だよ!! 全員集合 / 気になるエロの話)	November 5, 2018
6	"The Man with a Secret Power / Our Fair-Day War" "Hime rareshi chikara o motsu mono / Boku-ra no fea sensō" (秘められし力を持つ者 / ぼくらのフェア戦争)	November 12, 2018
7	"Tell Me! Wholesaler-san / A Networking Drinking Party for Booksellers" "Oshiete! Toritsugi-san / Shoten-in gottani nomikai" (おしえて！ 取次さん / 書店員ごった煮飲み会)	November 19, 2018
8	"Bookstores are so Wonderful! / The Shelves with and without Restrictions / Go for it, Azarashi-san ~The Hidden Ambition~" "Hon'yahaiizo / Haitte ī tana damena tana / Sorede! Azarashi-san 〜 hisokana yabō 〜" (ホンヤハイイゾ / 入っていい棚 だめな棚 / それいけ！ アザラシさん～密かなる野望～)	November 26, 2018
9	"A Book about Life, Death, and Rebirth" "Seitoshi to saisei no sho" (生と死と再生の書)	December 3, 2018
10	"An Outstanding Bookseller / Swapping Section Heads" "Hon'ya-san no Itsuzai / Tana no tantō henkō" (本屋さんのITSUZAI / 棚の担当変更)	December 10, 2018
11	"The Alternate Skull-face Bookseller Honda-san / You Can Quit Your Job Whenever You Want" "Isetsu gaikotsu-sho ten'in hon Honda-san / Shigoto nanka itsu demo yame rareru noda" (異説骸骨書店員 本田さん / 仕事なんかいつでも辞められるのだ)	December 17, 2018
12	"Merry Christmas, Mr. Bookstore / It's Time to Close" "Hon'ya no merīkurisumasu / Oshimai no jikandesu" (本屋のメリークリスマス / おしまいの時間です)	December 24, 2018
