= Madman Anime Festival =

Australian anime & Japanese culture convention

- Logo used from 2020 until its cancellation
- Status: Defunct
- Genre: Anime, Japanese popular culture
- Venue: Various
- Locations: Melbourne, VIC (2016–2019); Perth, WA (2017–2019); Brisbane, QLD (2017–2019); Sydney, NSW (2019–2020)
- Country: Australia
- Inaugurated: 2016 (Melbourne)
- Attendance: 4500 (2017, Perth)
- Organiser: Madman Anime
- Website: http://www.animefestival.com.au/

Anime Festival (formerly Madman Anime Festival or MadFest) was an annual Australian anime and Japanese culture convention held in Melbourne, Perth, Brisbane and Sydney. The convention was organised by Madman Anime. (Note: Madman Entertainment organised the event prior to the sale of Madman Anime to Sony Music Entertainment Japan's Aniplex in 2019, its reorganisation later that year as the Australian division of Funimation, itself owned by Sony Pictures since 2017 and Aniplex since 2019, and rebranding as Crunchyroll Store Australia in 2022 following Sony's acquisition of Crunchyroll in 2021 and Funimation's rebranding as Crunchyroll, LLC in 2022.) The convention was inaugurated in 2016 and held in Melbourne Convention and Exhibition Centre as a two-day event from the 3–4 September 2016 in Melbourne. The convention was later expanded to Perth and Brisbane in 2017 after a successful inaugural event, with each event held a few months apart, and to Sydney in 2019.

On 29 March 2022, it was announced that Anime Festival would be replaced with Crunchyroll Expo Australia, with the first event scheduled for 17–18 September 2022. Subsequently, all previously scheduled events were cancelled.

== Event history ==
Date	Location	Venue	Notable Events	Ref.
3–4 September 2016	Melbourne	Melbourne Convention and Exhibition Centre	Attendance by Makoto Furukawa, Shingo Natsume, Tomohiko Itō (director), Shingo Adachi, Atsushi Kaneko(A-1 Pictures), Sora Tokui, Cristina Vee, Yuko Miyamura, Tiffany Grant, Matt Greenfield, Tomia, Siera, AmenoKitarou (A.K. Wirru); First to hold a Tokyo Ghoul Exhibit in Australia.; Premiere of One Piece Film: Gold.	
4–5 March 2017	Perth	Perth Convention and Exhibition Centre	Attendance by Erica Mendez, Crispin Freeman, Shingo Adachi, Angie, Knitemaya; First to hold The World of Sword Art Online exhibit in Australia; IA Vocaloid concert; Premiere screening of Sword Art Online: Ordinal Scale, Sailor Moon R: The Movie English re-dub	
10–11 June 2017	Brisbane	Brisbane Convention & Exhibition Centre	Attendance by Cherami Leigh, Ying Tze, Yūko Miyamura, Orochi X, Pinky Lu Xun, Katyuska Moonfox; First presentation of Attack on Titan The Exhibition - Wall Australia; Itasha Exhibition; Premiere screening of Black Butler: Book of the Atlantic, Sword Art Online: Ordinal Scale English dub, Dragon Ball Super English dub	
4–5 November 2017	Melbourne	Melbourne Convention and Exhibition Centre	Attendance by Shinichirō Watanabe, Kana Ueda, Atsuhiro Iwakami, Bryce Papenbrook, Ladybeard, AGS102; Attendance by cosplayers: Ely, AmenoKitarou (A.K. Wirru), Orochi X, Pinky Lu Xun, Knitemaya; Exclusive Your Name exhibition; Exclusive Cowboy Bebop exhibition; Premiere screening of Mary and the Witch's Flower, Fate/stay night: Heaven's Feel I. presage flower, No Game No Life: Zero, JoJo's Bizarre Adventure: Diamond Is Unbreakable Chapter I; Exclusive access to play Dragon Ball FighterZ before release, Attack on Titan in VR; Love Live! Sunshine!! Aqours First LoveLive! ~Step! Zero to One~ concert; Announcement of Shinichirō Watanabe's upcoming anime	
4–5 March 2018	Perth	Perth Convention and Exhibition Centre	Attendance by Shingo Adachi, Go Suzuki, Tomoya Nishigushi, Ray Chase; Attendance by cosplayers: Jin, Miguel, Kirilee, Giorgia; Premiere screening of Fairy Tail: Dragon Cry English dub, Attack on Titan: Roar of Awakening; Exclusive access to play Attack on Titan 2 before release	
2–3 June 2018	Brisbane	Brisbane Convention and Exhibition Centre	Attendance by Yui Ishikawa, J. Michael Tatum, AGS102; Attendance by cosplayers: Baobao, Jutsu Cosplay; Premiere screening of Maquia: When the Promised Flower Blooms, Love, Chunibyo & Other Delusions! Take on Me	
15–16 September 2018	Melbourne	Melbourne Convention and Exhibition Centre	Attendance by Christopher Sabat, Luna Haruna, Nanaka Suwa, Ayako Kawasumi, Kōki Uchiyama; Attendance by cosplayers: Pugoffka; World premiere screening of Sword Art Online: Alicization; Premiere screening of I Want to Eat Your Pancreas, Penguin Highway, My Hero Academia: Two Heroes, K: Seven Stories 1 and 2; Access to play My Hero One's Justice, Jump Force, Black Clover: Quartet Knights, Dragon Ball FighterZ for Nintendo Switch, One Piece: World Seeker, Soulcalibur VI, Taiko no Tatsujin, Devil May Cry 5 before Australian release; Dragon Ball Super exclusive display; One Piece display; Tokyo Ghoul Twitter art display; Hatsune Miku Magical Mirai 2017 concert	
16–17 March 2019	Sydney	International Convention Centre Sydney	Attendance by Cherami Leigh, Sumire Morohoshi, Yoshitsugu Matsuoka, Satoshi Tsuruoka, Shizuka Kurosaki, Hideaki Itsuno, Matthew Walker, Eir Aoi, Asuka Ōkura, DJ Kazu, Shinichiro Miki, Kazuki Yao, AGS102; Attendance by cosplayers: Ely; Premiere screening of Fate/stay night: Heaven's Feel II. lost butterfly, Code Geass: Lelouch of the Re;surrection, Love Live! Sunshine!! The School Idol Movie: Over the Rainbow; Dragon Ball Super Broly photo spot; Tokyo Ghoul: Sui Ishida manga artwork display; Sword Art Online exhibition; Fate/Grand Order experience; One Piece display	
25–26 May 2019	Brisbane	Brisbane Convention and Exhibition Centre	Attendance by: Erica Mendez, Shingo Adachi, Go Suzuki, Yumiko Yamamoto, AGS102; Live online meet and greet with: Ayahi Takagaki, Aki Toyosaki; Attendance by cosplayers: Mangalphantom; Premiere screening of Is It Wrong to Try to Pick Up Girls in a Dungeon? The Movie: Arrow of the Orion; World premiere screening of Demon Slayer: Kimetsu no Yaiba episode 8; Tokyo Ghoul:re Kagune display; The Promised Neverland exhibition	
14–15 September 2019	Melbourne	Melbourne Convention and Exhibition Centre	Attendance by: Cherami Leigh, Natsuki Hanae. Akari Kito, Aina Aiba, Shinichiro Miki, Yuu Asakawa, Yuuma Takahashi, Shizuka Kurosaki, AGS102; Attendance by cosplayers: Aza Miyuko, K & A.K Wirru; Premiere screening of One Piece Stampede, Rascal Does Not Dream of a Dreaming Girl, BanG Dream! FILM LIVE, Promare, My Hero Academia Season 4 English dub, Anemone: Psalm of Planets Eureka Seven: Hi-Evolution; World premiere screening of Demon Slayer: Kimetsu no Yaiba episode 24; Screening of Human Lost	
5–6 October 2019	Perth	Perth Convention and Exhibition Centre	Attendance by: Cristina Vee, Haruo Sotozaki, Akira Matsushima, Yuuma Takahashi, AGS102; Live link with Sally Amaki as Sakura Fujima from 22/7; Screening of Promare, One Piece Stampede, My Hero Academia Season 4 English dub, Anemone: Psalm of Planets Eureka Seven: Hi-Evolution; World premiere screening of Sword Art Online: Alicization - War of Underworld episodes 1 and 2; Screening of Fate/Grand Order - Absolute Demonic Front: Babylonia episodes 1 and 2	
7–8 March 2020	Sydney	International Convention Centre Sydney	Attendance by: Bryce Papenbrook, Ricco Fajardo, David Matranga, Shingo Adachi, Arisa Uki, AGS102 (Note: Attendances by Yuki Kaji, Kana Ueda, Kensuke Tateishi, Kaori Maeda, Mayu Sagara, and Luna Haruna were cancelled due to policies related to the COVID-19 pandemic.); Attendance by cosplayers: Mon, A.K Wirru; Premiere screening of Digimon Adventure: Last Evolution Kizuna; Premiere screening of My Hero Academia: Heroes Rising; World premiere of Kaguya-sama: Love Is War Season 2; World premiere of My Hero Academia Season 4 Episode 21; Screening of Live Spectacle NARUTO ～Song of the Akatsuki～; Access to play Final Fantasy VII Remake before release; Access to play Bandai Namco games before release	
23–24 May 2020 (cancelled)	Brisbane	Brisbane Convention and Exhibition Centre	The event was cancelled due to the COVID-19 pandemic	
29–30 August 2020 (cancelled)	Melbourne	Melbourne Convention and Exhibition Centre	The event was cancelled due to the COVID-19 pandemic	
3–4 October 2020 (cancelled)	Perth	Perth Convention and Exhibition Centre	The event was cancelled due to the COVID-19 pandemic	
March 2021 (cancelled)	Sydney	International Convention Centre Sydney	The event was cancelled due to the COVID-19 pandemic	
May 2021 (cancelled)	Brisbane	Brisbane Convention and Exhibition Centre	The event was cancelled due to the COVID-19 pandemic	
2021 (cancelled)	Melbourne	Melbourne Convention and Exhibition Centre	The event was cancelled due to the COVID-19 pandemic	
2021 (cancelled)	Perth	Perth Convention and Exhibition Centre	The event was cancelled due to the COVID-19 pandemic	
12–13 March 2022 (cancelled)	Sydney	International Convention Centre Sydney	The event was cancelled and replaced with Crunchyroll Expo Australia	
21–22 May 2022 (cancelled)	Brisbane	Brisbane Convention and Exhibition Centre	The event was cancelled and replaced with Crunchyroll Expo Australia	
