= My Hero Academia season 3 =

Third season of My Hero Academia

My Hero Academia
- Season 3
- Cover art of the first Blu-ray volume of the third season released by Toho on July 18, 2018
- No. of episodes: 25

Release
- Original network: ytv, NTV
- Original release: April 7 – September 29, 2018

Season chronology
- ← Previous; Season 2 Next → Season 4

The third season of the My Hero Academia anime television series was produced by Bones and directed by Kenji Nagasaki, with Yōsuke Kuroda handling series composition, Yoshihiko Umakoshi providing character designs and Yuki Hayashi composed the music. Like the rest of the series, it adapts Kōhei Horikoshi's original My Hero Academia manga series from the rest of the 8th volume through the beginning of the 14th volume. It covers the "Forest Training Camp" (chapters 70–83), "Hideout Raid" (chapters 84–97), "Provisional Hero License Exam" (chapters 98–121), and the beginning of "Shie Hassaikai" arc (chapters 122–124). The season aired from April 7 to September 29, 2018, on ytv and NTV in Japan.

The season follows Izuku Midoriya and his classmates from U.A. High, a prestigious high school for heroes in training. The students facing their struggles and challenges as they fight for their survival during a training camp and a quest to save one of their classmates. The second half of the season focuses on the students' preparation for the Provisional Hero License Exam, a test that allows the students to obtain a Hero License and take part of their Hero-Work Studies as full-fledged Heroes.

Toho released the season on DVD and Blu-ray in eight compilations, each containing two to four episodes, between July 18, 2018, and February 13, 2019. Funimation licensed the season for an English-language release in North America and released it in two compilations on May 7 and September 3, 2019. FunimationNow is streaming the season in Simuldub, while Crunchyroll and Hulu are simulcasting outside of Asia as it airs. Funimation's adaptation ran from March 3 to August 18, 2019, on Adult Swim's Toonami block.

Four pieces of theme music are used for this season: two opening themes and two ending themes. For the first thirteen episodes, the opening theme is "Odd Future" by Uverworld and the first ending theme is "Update" (アップデート) by miwa. For the rest of the season, the second opening theme is "Make my story" by Lenny code fiction and the ending theme is "Long Hope Philia" (ロングホープ・フィリア) by Masaki Suda.

== Episodes ==
No. overall	No. in season	Title	Directed by (Note: Information is taken from the ending credits of each episode.)	Storyboarded by	Original release date	English air date	Viewership rating
39	1	"Game Start"; Transliteration: "Gēmu Sutāto" (Japanese: ゲーム・スタート)	Takudai Kakuchi	Takudai Kakuchi	April 7, 2018	March 3, 2019	4.9%
Following the end of the semester, Izuku continues to train in his apartment. It still feels surreal to him to have All Might's power coursing through him. He is interrupted when Denki Kaminari and Minoru Mineta suddenly arrive at his door and ask him to train at the pool before the training camp arrives. At U.A. High School, Shota Aizawa and Vlad King review the Quirks of their respective students from Class 1-A and Class 1-B. Izuku, Kaminari, and Mineta arrive to ask if they can use the pool, which Aizawa confirms. The students of Class 1-A have a PE class at the pool, while reminiscing about the main events of the previous seasons. During the night, Aizawa and Vlad King discuss that the location of the training camp has been changed to protect the students. Tomura Shigaraki gives someone a call to tell them a "new game" will be starting soon.
40	2	"Wild, Wild Pussycats"; Transliteration: "Wairudo Wairudo Pusshīkyattsu" (Japanese: ワイルド・ワイルド・プッシーキャッツ)	Tomo Ōkubo	Shinji Satō	April 14, 2018	March 10, 2019	2.9%
On the day of the forest lodge trip, Class 1-A and 1-B prepare to board buses. An hour later, Class 1-A's bus stops for a restroom break. Suddenly, two women wearing cat-like costumes and a small boy appear. The women introduce themselves as the professional Hero Team, The Wild Wild Pussycats, while the boy is revealed to be Kota, an orphan in their care who despises heroes. Mandalay tells Class 1-A that they must reach the training camp at the base of the mountain by midday or they will miss lunch. Despite their best efforts, Class 1-A's progress is inhibited by earthen beasts throughout the forest, controlled by Pixie-Bob with her Quirk, and the students miss their deadline by hours. However, team Pussycats is satisfied with their performances, and they are offered dinner instead. Afterwards, Class 1-A go to the hot springs for a bath. Mineta tries to peek at the girls' bath side but is prevented by Kota; Kota accidentally sees the girls and faints but is saved by Izuku. Izuku brings the unconscious Kota to the cabin and learns the story of his parents; pro heroes who died in the line of duty.
41	3	"Kota"; Transliteration: "Kōta-kun" (Japanese: 洸汰くん)	Tetsuya Miyanishi (Note: Credited under the pen name "Setsumu Dōkawa" (堂川 セツム, Dōkawa Setsumu).)	Satoshi Matsumoto (Note: Unknown storyboard artist; believed to be a pen name of Rie Matsumoto.)	April 21, 2018	March 17, 2019	3.6%
Class 1-A and 1-B continues training as the villains prepare to attack. Despite Kota's hatred for heroes, and the superhuman society in general, Izuku tries to convince Kota by telling his own tales as his friend's story. In the third day of training camp, the students who failed the finals exam had to stay up the previous night for extra lessons. Aizawa pushes them to stay awake and try harder. He also reminds Ochaco and Aoyama's team that they need to work hard too since they barely passed finals. Izuku asks Aizawa if All Might will be joining the campers, but Aizawa says he will not be at all. Pixie-Bob announces that both classes will compete in a test of courage after training. Later at night, Aizawa takes the remedial students to a classroom while everyone else participates in the Pussycats mini-game. The group of villains named The Vanguard Action Squad, arrives and begins to attack when the students are participating in a training exercise and catch them unaware. Izuku remembers Kota is by himself. Kota is at his secret hideout overlooking the burning forest. Little does he know, a villain has already found him.
42	4	"My Hero"; Transliteration: "Boku no Hīrō" (Japanese: 僕のヒーロー)	Shōji Ikeno	Michio Fukuda	April 28, 2018	March 24, 2019	3.7%
At his secret hiding spot, Kota recalls Mandalay telling him that one day he will understand why heroes exist. Kota refuses to believe that. He stands up and notices the mountainside burning. The villains continue their attack, working in teams or alone to target different groups of students and teachers. Deeper in the forest, Tetsutetsu runs into Kendo and gives her a gas mask created by Momo's Quirk. Kendo tells Tetsutetsu to retreat with her, but he refuses. Class 1-A has gotten so much stronger because of their fights with villains, Tetsutetsu believes that this is the perfect opportunity to fight back and catch up with their peers. Muscular, one of the villains chances upon Kota at his secret hideout and Kota recognizes him from news reports as his parents' killer. Muscular tries to kill him, but is stopped by Izuku. Muscular reveals the League of Villains are after Bakugo. Izuku is pushed to his limit in the fight by Muscular's Muscle Augmentation Quirk but manages to defeat Muscular with a 1,000,000% Delaware Detroit Smash and saves Kota. Kota finally overcomes his prejudices due to Izuku's selflessness and calls him "My Hero".
43	5	"Drive It Home, Iron Fist!!!"; Transliteration: "Buchikomu Tekken!!!" (Japanese: ブチ込む鉄拳!!!)	Naoki Hishikawa	Ken Ōtsuka	May 5, 2018	March 31, 2019	3.4%
After defeating Muscular, Izuku carries Kota back to the camp and runs into Aizawa. Izuku passes Kota over to him, as he has a message to deliver to everyone through Mandalay's telepathy. The teacher asks Izuku to deliver a message from him as well. Mandalay delivers the messages that Bakugo is one of the villains' targets and the students have permission to use their Quirks to defend themselves. Meanwhile, Bakugo and Todoroki are confronted by an escaped death row convict, Moonfish, Tetsutetsu and Kendo find the source of a poisonous gas that is filling part of the forest: a villain named Mustard. The two work together to defeat Mustard and this results in the gas dissipating. Izuku runs into Shoji while searching for Bakugo and learns that Tokoyami's Quirk, Dark Shadow, is out of control.
44	6	"Roaring Upheaval"; Transliteration: "Ganaru Fūunkyū" (Japanese: がなる風雲急)	Shōji Ikeno	Shinji Satō	May 12, 2018	April 7, 2019	N/A
Shoji asks for Izuku's help in saving Tokoyami from his own Quirk and to choose between saving Tokoyami or Bakugo. Midoriya devises a plan to save both, which involves leading Dark Shadow to Bakugo and Todoroki who are fighting the villain Moonfish. Dark Shadow defeats Moonfish and is then weakened and brought back under control by Bakugo and Todoroki. The students team up and run into Ochaco and Tsuyu fighting a villain named Himiko Toga. As there are now more students present than she is ready to take on by herself, Toga retreats. Izuku asks the girls to help them protect Bakugo but Bakugo and Tokoyami have already been kidnapped by the villain Mr. Compress. A Nomu chases Yosetsu of Class 1-B who is carrying a heavily injured Momo but the Nomu is called back by Dabi as their mission has been accomplished. Momo makes a tracking device which Yosetsu attaches to the Nomu. Izuku and the others continue to chase Mr. Compress but are unable to keep up with his speed. Midoriya devises a plan to launch him, Todoroki and Shoji into the air using Ochaco and Tsuyu's Quirks. They manage to successfully tackle Mr. Compress to the ground.
45	7	"What a Twist!"; Transliteration: "Ten Ten Ten!" (Japanese: 転転転!)	Tomo Ōkubo	Tomo Ōkubo	May 19, 2018	April 13, 2019 (Note: Adult Swim moved My Hero Academia back a half-hour (to 11:30 p.m. EDT/PDT).)	3.2%
Izuku, Todoroki and Shoji have caught up with Mr. Compress, and with Aoyama's assistance, they manage to rescue Tokoyami. However, the villains retreat with Bakugo, leaving the heroes-in-training in anguish. U.A. faces serious backlash over the next couple of days, even while the police pursues a lead to find the League of Villains. Izuku wakes up in a hospital bed, two days after the attack. Almost all of Class 1-A students comes to visit him. Kirishima and Todoroki reveal that they plan to go rescue Bakugo. But Ida argues that they need to allow the Pro Heroes to handle the situation. He and Kirishima argue, and the latter reaches out to Izuku for approval.
46	8	"From Iida to Midoriya"; Transliteration: "Īda-kara Midoriya e" (Japanese: 飯田から緑谷へ)	Tetsuya Miyanishi (Note: Tomo Ōkubo was erroneously credited instead in the TV broadcast.)	Shinji Ishihira (Note: Shinji Satō was erroneously credited instead in the TV broadcast.)	May 26, 2018	April 20, 2019	3.7%
At Izuku's room in the hospital, Class 1-A debates whether or not they should attempt a rescue mission. Kirishima lets Izuku know that he and Todoroki intend to make their move that very night. U.A. organizes a press conference whose airing is met with criticism. Meanwhile, the police continues with their investigation and organizes a team of heroes to strike back against the villains. Izuku decides to join Todoroki and Kirishima in their attempt to rescue Bakugo, and so does Momo. Ida attempts to convince them to drop their plan, but ultimately he decides to join so that he can keep an eye on them and call the mission off if actual combat breaks out. The brave group of students named The Bakugo Rescue Squad, arrives to Kamino Ward and change into disguises to avoid standing out. Shigaraki attempts to convince Bakugo to join the League of Villains, but Bakugo reveals his commitment to becoming a hero and begins attacking Twice and Shigaraki.
47	9	"All For One"; Transliteration: "Ōru Fō Wan" (Japanese: オール・フォー・ワン)	Yūsuke Kamata	Ken Ōtsuka	June 2, 2018	April 27, 2019	4.2%
Izuku, Momo, Todoroki, Kirishima, and Ida continue their search and rescue to save Bakugo. None of them have effective stealth skills, so they ponder their next move. Izuku starts to mutter and Ida thinks about how he needs to keep the group out of trouble. After arriving at what seems to be the hideout, they discover a large number of Nomus inside. The Pro Heroes then capture the members of the League of Villains, but an unexpected warp attacks the heroes and takes Bakugo once again. Unbeknownst to them, the greatest villain is about to make his reappearance as Izuku and the others are stricken with fear.
48	10	"Symbol of Peace"; Transliteration: "Heiwa no Shōchō" (Japanese: 平和の象徴)	Yūji Ōya	Shinji Ishihira	June 9, 2018	May 4, 2019	3.6%
All For One, the mastermind behind the League of Villains, has snatched back his underlings from the heroes, and Bakugo as well. All For One commends Best Jeanist for saving himself while protecting the other heroes from the explosion. Best Jeanist recognizes the masked man as the suspected ringleader of the League of Villains. The Pro-Hero attacks, but All For One easily defeats him with a blast of air. The villain recognizes that his strength comes from practice and experience and decides his Quirk does not need to be taken. As All For One is about to notice the students, All Might suddenly appears and flies to the rescue, but he is worried about Bakugo's safety and cannot fight at full power. All Might tells his ultimate rival that he will defeat him and lock him up for the rest of his life. All Might rushes him, but All For One repels him with an enhanced Quirk combo attack. Izuku comes up with a plan that would allow the students to escape with Bakugo, without fighting the villains, and it all comes down to Kirishima.
49	11	"One For All"; Transliteration: "Wan Fō Ōru" (Japanese: ワン・フォー・オール)	Tetsuya Miyanishi	Shinji Ishihira	June 16, 2018	May 11, 2019	4.5%
All Might and All For One clash furiously as their battle is witnessed by the entire world. All Might allows himself to be hit by an attack to protect a civilian but revert to his true form, revealing his secret to the world. To shatter All Might's resolve, All For One reveals that he brainwashed the grandson of All Might's mentor, whom he killed, over several years into the now notorious Tomura Shigaraki; which strikes a pain into All Might's heart. This backfires as the hero now musters his power into his fist to deliver his strongest attack: the United States of Smash. Victorious but entirely spent, All Might sends a message through the TV which the populace thinks is a threat to future villains; however Izuku realizes it is to let him know that it is time for him take on the mantle of the world's Symbol of Peace.
50	12	"End of the Beginning, Beginning of the End"; Transliteration: "Hajimari no Owari Owari no Hajimari" (Japanese: 始まりの終わり 終わりの始まり)	Shōji Ikeno	Satomi Nakamura	June 23, 2018	May 18, 2019	2.8%
As All Might is officially retired, the Police hold a closed conference on how this may embolden more villains to Shigaraki's League. A depressed Izuku receives a text from All Might to meet at Degoba Beach where he trained for the entrance exams and the two share a heartfelt moment. Sometime later, Aizawa and All Might visit the student's parents to discuss a new dorm system to better protect the students. While many are open to it, including the Bakugo family, Izuku's mother Inko is against it as her son has repeatedly suffered grave bodily injuries in emulation of All Might since attending U.A. To prove his determination, Izuku shows his mother the note from Kota thanking him for being his hero; and as a show of humility, All Might bows his head to the ground to promise Inko he will be a better teacher for Izuku, finally earning her hesitant approval. Izuku promises to be more considerate of his mother's feelings from now on and work to be safer. Meanwhile, as All For One is imprisoned in the Maximum Security Prison "Tartarus", he is gleeful that Shigaraki will now evolve with his teacher's absence.
51	13	"Moving into Dorms"; Transliteration: "Haire Ryō" (Japanese: 入れ寮)	Tetsuya Miyanishi	Takashi Kawabata	June 30, 2018	May 25, 2019	3.5%
After Izuku's mother reluctantly allows him to live in the dorm, he and all his friends shift to the recently constructed dorm for 1-A. The principal thinks to himself about how the dorm does not only help the students, but to determine the identity of the "U.A. traitor". Aizawa informs the class that, had the situation been different, he would have expelled not only those who went to save Bakugo, but also those who knew about their plan and did not stop them, excluding Bakugo, Hagakure, and Jiro. After explaining the dorm system, Aizawa leaves the students to unpack. Later that evening, most of the students (the exception being Bakugo and Tsuyu) take a tour of the rooms to elect a King of Rooms. Sato is the surprise winner, due to his baking talent. Ochaco calls those who went to save Bakugo out to the courtyard. There, Tsuyu reveals her conflicted feelings that she was unable to prevent her friends from breaking the rules, and her desire for everything to go back the way it was before. Ochaco confirms that the whole class feels the same way, ergo the King of Rooms contest. The Bakugo Rescue Squad apologizes to Tsuyu, and Izuku looks forward to the future.
52	14	"Create Those Ultimate Moves"; Transliteration: "Ame Hissatsuwaza" (Japanese: 編め必殺技)	Satoshi Takafuji	Shinji Ishihira	July 14, 2018	June 1, 2019	N/A
Izuku wakes up from a dream where he and All Might had a conversation by the beach, and prepares for school along with his classmates who now all reside in the newly constructed dorm. During homeroom, Aizawa emphasizes that to be able to pass the provisional license which only has a 50% rate of passing in being a hero, they must acquire at least 2 ultimate moves. They were guided by Cementoss, Midnight and Ectoplasm. Inside the gym, while everyone was busy training, All Might appeared and gave each students some advice. Izuku, who has trouble creating an ultimate move went to the development studio to have his costume altered to support the ligaments of his arms. There together with Ida and Ochaco, they were reunited with support hero Hatsume who was developing her new support items which she eagerly tried on them. After several conversations, Izuku was able to come up with an idea on how to overcome his problem and redesigned his costume. Just as a rock that Bakugo hits with his ultimate move falls towards All Might, Izuku jumps in and destroys it with his ultimate move, Full Cowling: Shoot Style, a technique where uses his legs contrasting All Might who primarily uses his arms.
53	15	"The Test"; Transliteration: "Za Shiken" (Japanese: THE試験)	Masahiro Mukai	Kō Matsuo	July 21, 2018	June 8, 2019	3.2%
Class 1-A were finally able to adjust their costumes and create ultimate weapons. Before their training is finished, Class 1-B arrives at the gym claiming the place to be their time for training. Monoma, who has an obvious dislike for class 1-A, provokes them haughtily and declares to defeat their class in the coming examination; however, Aizawa states that the two classes will be having the exam in different locations to avoid fighting each other. After reaching the place for the provisional examination, Aizawa meets Ms. Joke, a colleague from his former neighboring agency. She constantly teases him into going out with her, to which he always quickly declines. The class meets several other students from other schools and the test starts with an elimination exam. However, unbeknownst to the U.A. students, there is a tradition where other schools primarily target U.A. students every time an examination starts.
54	16	"Shiketsu High Lurking"; Transliteration: "Haiyoru Shiketsu Kōkō" (Japanese: 這い寄る士傑高校)	Tetsuya Miyanishi	Motonobu Hori	July 28, 2018	June 15, 2019	4.5%
Ketsubutsu Academy students ambush Class 1-A, but they manage to evade Ketsubutsu's balls by working together. Shindo then separates them by using his Vibrate Quirk to break the ground. Meanwhile, in another part of the arena, Shiketsu High School's Inasa uses his Whirlwind Quirk to pass, taking out 120 students at once. Izuku gets hit once by Shiketsu High School student Camie using her Quirk. A big group of students finds them but Izuku manages to dodge all of their attacks. He rescues Ochaco, but he discovers that it is only Camie pretending to be Ochaco. Sero and the real Ochaco help him. Somewhere else, Todoroki is ambushed by a group of students from Seijin High School.
55	17	"Class 1-A"; Transliteration: "Ichi-Nen Ei-Gumi" (Japanese: 1年A組)	Takahiro Hasui	Shinji Ishihira	August 4, 2018	June 22, 2019	3.2%
As the battle continues, Todoroki uses his fire Quirk against a water attack in order to generate a huge steam cloud, thus obscuring his opponents' vision. He lures his opponents to a large gas tank and ignites it, causing them to be knocked down and then subdued with his ice Quirk. He easily activates their target rings and passes the exam. While trapped in a building, Shoji, Tsuyu, Jiro and Momo also pass the exam after defeating their opponents from Seiai Academy. Meanwhile, Izuku comes up with a plan that will allow him, Ochaco and Sero to pass the exam. Elsewhere, Bakugo, Kaminari and Kirishima face off against Shiketsu High student Seiji Shishikura. While waiting for the exam to conclude, Aizawa comments to Ms. Joke that he has noticed that Izuku and Bakugo seem to inspire Class 1-A to achieve greatness.
56	18	"Rush!"	Shōji Ikeno	Atsushi Takahashi	August 11, 2018	June 29, 2019	3.7%
Seiji uses his "Meatball" Quirk to neutralize both Kirishima and Bakugo. However, Kaminari uses one of Bakugo's grenades to distract Seiji long enough to zap him with his electricity Quirk. Seiji temporarily loses control of his Quirk, allowing Kirishima and Bakugo to retaliate. Together, the three students are able to pass the test. Meanwhile, Izuku acts as a decoy, allowing Ochaco and Sero to restrain all of their opponents, and those three pass the exam as well. Elsewhere, Ida is searching for stray Class 1-A students and finds Aoyama hiding alone, when they are attacked by many students. They try to run away, but Aoyama shoots his navel laser into the air as a beacon. His plan is to sacrifice himself by luring the enemy close, allowing Ida to use his super speed to target three opponents and pass the test. Just as all seems lost, the rest of Class 1-A arrives to assist in defeating the nearby students. Thanks to Aoyama's beacon, the rest of Class 1-A all pass, bringing the number of successful examinees to 100 and the event to an end.
57	19	"Rescue Exercises"; Transliteration: "Kyūjo Enshū" (Japanese: 救助演習)	Masahiro Mukai	Shinji Ishihira	August 18, 2018	July 7, 2019 (Note: Adult Swim moved My Hero Academia to 3:30 a.m. EDT/PDT beginning on the night of July 6, 2019, which is July 7.)	N/A
The students are tasked with rescuing citizens from a disaster (the citizens are professionals from the "Help Us Company", which specializes in acting as hostages that need to be saved). Izuku believes this scenario was inspired by the one during the Kamino Incident. Ida says that there were many casualties while their group was focused on rescuing Bakugo. Izuku states they will need to do their best. Ochaco watches Camie exit the building and struggles to come to terms with her feelings for Izuku. She tries to talk to him but the test suddenly begins. The older students set up a first-aid station for the other heroes to bring the citizens to. The students split up to cover more ground and work as teams to effectively rescue everyone. Ochaco decides to push her feelings for Izuku on the side to focus more on developing her skills as a hero. The students appear to be doing well, until Gang Orca arrives to challenge them to fend off villains while continuing to rescue the citizens.
58	20	"Special Episode: Save the World with Love!"; Transliteration: "Tokubetsu-hen・Ai de Chikyū o Sukue!" (Japanese: 特別編・愛で地球を救え!)	Tetsuya Miyanishi	Shinji Satō	August 25, 2018	July 14, 2019	4.8%
In this anime-exclusive story taking place before the summer training camp, Izuku, Ochaco, Ida, Todoroki, Tsuyu, and Bakugo are tasked with defeating a villain (played by All Might) and rescuing three hostages (played by Cementoss, Midnight, and Present Mic) in a simulated jewelry robbery. While Todoroki distracts All Might with a phone call, Ochaco scopes out the situation. Bakugo charges in, only to discover All Might dead of a knife wound. The students begin to investigate the crime scene. After eliminating the possibility of an accomplice who turned against him, Izuku deduces that Midnight was All Might's lover who called the police and went into the jewelry store to try and stop him, and All Might committed suicide to protect her from the backlash of his actions. Aizawa appears and commends Izuku for his deductions, but gives the students a zero for failing to realize that All Might had faked his own death as a ploy to escape. In the aftermath, All Might is invited to attend the I-Expo at I-Island by his old sidekick's daughter Melissa Shield, and invites Izuku to tag along with him, setting up the events for My Hero Academia The Movie: Two Heroes.
59	21	"What's the Big Idea?"; Transliteration: "Nani o Shitendayo" (Japanese: 何をしてんだよ)	Ikurō Satō	Shinji Satō	September 1, 2018	July 21, 2019	3.1%
The rescue exercises continue, with Pro Hero Gang Orca being recruited to act as a villain to attack whilst the students are attempting to obtain their Provisional Licenses. He tries to attack the first-aid camp, and breaks Ketsubutsu student Shindo's attempt to distract him. Todoroki attempts to fend Gang Orca off with a stream of fire, but just as the fire is about to hit him, Shiketsu student Inasa diverts the fire with his own Quirk. The two students quickly get into an argument, with Inasa revealing that the reason he hates Todoroki is due to a past experience with Todoroki's father, Endeavor. Unbeknownst to both of them, the fire that was diverted was close to hitting a downed Shindo before Izuku intervenes with Full Cowling, and yells at both the students. This snaps Todoroki out of it, as he tries to attack Gang Orca again; only for Inasa to again divert the fire. Gang Orca gets tired of hearing the two bicker and sends them both crashing to the ground. The two students soon both realize the triviality of their arguing and combine their Quirks to trap Gang Orca in a fire spiral. The fire spiral is enough to pick at Gang Orca, but he drenches himself in water and dissipates the flame spiral; soon before Izuku comes in with an attack using his Shoot Style while the other students save the last victims from the wreckage, the Provisional Hero License Exam has come to an end. Later, the students are all gathered by a screen to see who has obtained their Provisional License. Izuku looks for his name and surprised that he did passed the exam.
60	22	"A Talk about Your Quirk"; Transliteration: "Temee no "Kosei" no Hanashida" (Japanese: てめェの"個性"の話だ)	Tomo Ōkubo	Shinji Ishihira	September 8, 2018	July 28, 2019	3.3%
The staff reveals who all received their Provisional Licenses. Nearly all of Class 1-A received it with the exception of Todoroki and Bakugo, due to Todoroki's feud with Inasa (who also failed the test) and Bakugo's rudeness towards the victims. However, the ones who failed can make it up by taking a 3 month course to obtain their Provisional Licenses. Izuku tries to find Camie to talk to her, but her classmates tell him she was not feeling well and left early. It is revealed that Camie was actually Toga in disguise, as her quirk allows her to transform into those whose blood she consumes. She returns to the League of Villains with Izuku's blood. All Might interrogates All For One in prison, with the latter gloating about what he has accomplished despite being beaten to near-death and imprisoned. All Might vows to his enemy that Shigaraki will not kill him or Izuku. At night, Bakugo has Izuku meet him in the place where they had their mock match. He reveals that he has figured out the secrets behind Izuku's Quirk as witnessing All For One allowed him to understand that Quirks can be transferred and deduced Midoriya's connection to All Might. Frustrated with Izuku's progress and his acknowledgement from All Might, Bakugo challenges him to a fight.
61	23	"Deku vs. Kacchan, Part 2"; Transliteration: "Deku bāsasu Kacchan 2" (Japanese: デクvsかっちゃん2)	Masashi Abe, Shōji Ikeno	Shinji Satō	September 15, 2018	August 4, 2019	N/A
Bakugo fights close and fast to give Izuku less time to strategize, but Izuku manages to keep up by increasing One For All to eight percent. During the brawl, Bakugo admits that he hates the thought of someone previously weak like Izuku surpassing him and has been blaming himself for All Might's retirement. While the match is close, Bakugo ends up winning after pinning Izuku to the ground. All Might shows up having witnessed the whole fight and informs Bakugo that he should not be blaming himself for All Might's retirement and tells him about the history of One For All with Bakugo vowing to keep it a secret. He informs the two heroes that they each lack what the other has (Izuku's conviction to save others and Bakugo's desire to win) and that finding the balance between the two will improve themselves as heroes. He then takes the two back to their dorms, where Aizawa suspends the two from classes for few days (Izuku for three and Bakugo for four). Despite the outcome, All Might believes it was necessary to help the two become proper rivals in their quests toward becoming the ultimate heroes.
62	24	"A Season for Encounters"; Transliteration: "Deai no Kisetsu" (Japanese: 出会いの季節)	Tomo Ōkubo	Shinji Ishihira	September 22, 2018	August 11, 2019	3.5%
Twice observes the changes in society after All Might's retirement, noting how the combination of All Might's absence and public unease of Endeavor taking his place has caused a surge in villain activity. He also reflects how irresponsible use of his quirk caused him to be eternally uncertain if he is real or a copy of himself, and that the League of Villains is the only place that would accept a damaged person like him. He then witnesses a villain named Overhaul kill another group of villains. Meanwhile, U.A. holds its opening ceremony, where the Principal announces that the first year students will begin the Hero Work-Studies earlier than usual due to the rising villain threat. Izuku returns to class after he serves his house arrest, where Aizawa introduces The Big Three, the top three students of U.A., who will be helping Class 1-A with their hero work studies.
63	25	"Unrivaled"; Transliteration: "Muteki" (Japanese: 無敵)	Kenji Nagasaki	Kenji Nagasaki	September 29, 2018	August 18, 2019	5.1%
Izuku and his classmates have a battle test with Mirio Togata to prepare for next step to be Real Pro Heroes. The battle begins when Class 1-A's close combat team tries to surround Mirio, but everyone is taken by surprise when Mirio's clothes suddenly fall off his body. Izuku tries to exploit the openings in his opponent's defense but his kicks go clean through Mirio's physical form. The other students launch an ambush and Mirio swiftly appears behind everyone. Mirio effortlessly knocks out every student of Class 1-A, even Izuku, where Mirio uses his super move called Blinder Touch Eyeball Crush to defeat him. Afterwards, Mirio apologizes to everyone about being naked and asks the class if they have a better idea about work studies. The class thinks that his Quirk is too strong and ask to learn the nature of it. Mirio revealed that his Quirk is called Permeation, which allows his physical form to go through anything if he activates it throughout his entire body. Before Aizawa instructs his class to thank The Big Three and depart, Class 1-A applauds Mirio's speech about his Quirk and they realize what the work study could do for their skills. Meanwhile, Bubble Girl reports to Sir Nighteye that Overhaul has made contact with the League of Villains, when Twice brings him to an interview location with the other members of the league.

== Home video release ==
=== Japanese ===
Toho released the third season of the anime on DVD and Blu-ray in eight volumes in Japan, with the first volume released on July 18, 2018, and the final volume released on February 13, 2019.

Toho Animation (Japan – Region 2/A)
Volume	Episodes	Release date	Ref.
1	39–42	July 18, 2018	
2	43–45	August 15, 2018	
3	46–48	September 19, 2018	
4	49–51	October 17, 2018	
5	52–54	November 14, 2018	
6	55–57	December 19, 2018	
7	58–60	January 16, 2019	
8	61–63	February 13, 2019	

=== English ===
Funimation released the third season in North America in two volumes, with the first volume released on May 7, 2019, and the second volume on September 3, 2019. The first volume received a limited edition combo release, along with a standard edition combo release, and a standard edition DVD release. The complete parts of two volumes received a Blu-ray release on November 10, 2020. In the United Kingdom and Ireland, Manga Entertainment distributed the season for Funimation, and released the first part in a limited edition combo release, along with a standard edition DVD and Blu-ray, on May 13, 2019, and the second part on September 9, 2019. In Australia and New Zealand, Madman Entertainment distributed the season for Funimation, and released the first part in standard and limited editions on August 7, 2019, and the second part on November 6, 2019.

Funimation (North America – Region 1/A)
Part		Episodes	Release date	Ref.
Season 3	1	39–50	May 7, 2019	
Season 3	2	51–63	September 3, 2019	
Season 3	Complete	39–63	November 10, 2020	

Manga Entertainment (United Kingdom and Ireland – Region 2/B)
Part		Episodes	Release date	Ref.
Season 3	1	39–50	May 13, 2019	
Season 3	2	51–63	September 9, 2019	

Madman Entertainment (Australia and New Zealand – Region 4/B)
Part		Episodes	Release date	Ref.
Season 3	1	39–50	August 7, 2019	
Season 3	2	51–63	November 6, 2019	
