= My Hero =

My Hero may refer to:

== Film ==
- My Hero (1912 film), a Western directed by D. W. Griffith
- My Hero (1920 film), an animated Felix the Cat film
- My Hero (1990 film), a Hong Kong action film starring Stephen Chow
- My Hero (2024 film), an Indian Kannada-language drama film

== Television ==
- My Hero (American TV series), a 1950s sitcom starring Robert Cummings
- My Hero (British TV series), a 2000s sitcom starring Ardal O'Hanlon and James Dreyfus
  - "My Hero" (My Hero episode), the first episode of the first series
- My Hero (Chinese TV series), a talent competition, won in 2007 by Jing Boran
- "My Hero" (The Jeffersons), an episode
- "My Hero" (Modern Family), an episode
- "My Hero" (Scrubs), an episode
- "My Hero?", an episode of I Dream of Jeannie
- "My Hero", an episode of the TV series Pocoyo

== Music ==
- My Hero, a 2015 album by Greta Bradman

=== Songs ===
- "My Hero" (song), by Foo Fighters, 1997
- "My Hero", by the Blue Notes
- "My Hero", by Level 42 from True Colours
- "My Hero", by Stereophonics from Keep the Village Alive
- "Mein Held!" ("My Hero!"), composed by Oscar Straus for the 1908 operetta The Chocolate Soldier

== Other uses ==
- My Hero (video game), a 1985 Sega beat 'em up game
- My Hero, a 1996 novel by Tom Holt
- The My Hero Project, a non-profit organization

== See also ==
- My Hero Academia, a 2014 manga by Kōhei Horikoshi
