= Yoshihiko Umakoshi =

Japanese animator

- 馬越 嘉彦
- Born: July 30, 1968 (age 58); Hakata, Ehime, Japan
- Occupations: Animator; character designer
- Years active: 1994–present
- Notable work: HeartCatch PreCure!; Ojamajo Doremi; My Hero Academia
- Awards: 2011 Tokyo Anime Award for best character design

Yoshihiko Umakoshi (Japanese: 馬越 嘉彦, Hepburn: Umakoshi Yoshihiko; born July 30, 1968) is a Japanese animator and character designer. In 1994, he was put in charge of character designs for the first time with Marmalade Boy. Since then, he has done character designs for many series, such as HeartCatch PreCure!, Ojamajo Doremi, and My Hero Academia.

== Biography ==
Yoshihiko Umakoshi was born in Hakata, Ehime in 1968. Umakoshi debuted as a character designer in 1994 with Marmalade Boy. In 2011, due to his work on HeartCatch PreCure!, he won the award for best character designer at the 2011 Tokyo Anime Award.

Starting in 2016, Umakoshi created the character designs for the anime adaptation of My Hero Academia. He also provided the character designs for the four anime films based on the series. The series has received praise, with Paste ranking the adaptation among the top 40 anime of all time. Polygon, Crunchyroll, and IGN also named the adaptation as one of the best anime of the 2010s. At the Crunchyroll Anime Awards, the adaptation was nominated for anime of the year in 2016 and the film My Hero Academia: Two Heroes won the award for best film in 2018. In 2020, Umakoshi did the character designs for Looking for Magical Doremi, which won the Mainichi Film Award for Best Animation Film.

== Works ==
=== TV series ===
- Marmalade Boy (1994–1995) (character designer)
- Neighborhood Story (1995–1996) (character designer)
- Boys Over Flowers (1996–1997) (character designer)
- Berserk (1997) (character designer)
- Ojamajo Doremi (1999–2004) (character designer)
- Air Master (2003) (character designer)
- Guyver: The Bioboosted Armor (2005–2006) (character designer)
- Mushishi (2005–2014) (character designer)
- Casshern Sins (2008–2009) (character designer)
- HeartCatch PreCure! (2010–2011) (character designer)
- Saint Seiya Omega (2012–2014) (character designer)
- My Hero Academia (2016–2026) (character designer)

=== Films ===
- Street Fighter Alpha: The Animation (2000) (character designer)
- My Hero Academia: Two Heroes (2018) (character designer)
- My Hero Academia: Heroes Rising (2019) (character designer)
- Looking for Magical Doremi (2020) (character designer)
- My Hero Academia: World Heroes' Mission (2021) (character designer)
- My Hero Academia: You're Next (2024) (character designer)

=== Video Games ===
- Bloody Roar: Primal Fury (2002) (supervising animator) https://www.mobygames.com/game/6017/bloody-roar-primal-fury/credits/gamecube/?autoplatform=true
