= Kenji Nagasaki =

Japanese director (born 1972)

- 長崎健司
- Born: February 12, 1972 (age 54); Hirakata, Osaka
- Other name: Tōji Kisaragi
- Occupation: Anime director
- Years active: 2001–present
- Employer: Madhouse
- Known for: My Hero Academia

Kenji Nagasaki (Japanese: 長崎健司, Hepburn: Nagasaki Kenji) is a Japanese anime director employed by Madhouse. He made his full directorial debut in 2011 with No. 6. Starting in 2016, he directed the anime adaptation of My Hero Academia, which has received praise from critics.

== Biography ==
Kenji Nagasaki decided to join the anime industry in high school after watching Hayao Miyazaki's Castle in the Sky. He debuted as a series director with the anime adaptation of No. 6. In 2013, he directed Gundam Build Fighters, based on the Gundam franchise. In 2015, he directed the anime original series Classroom Crisis.

Starting in 2016, Nagasaki directed the anime adaptation of My Hero Academia. He also directed the three anime films based on the series. The series has received praise, with Paste ranking the adaptation among the top 40 anime of all time. Polygon, Crunchyroll, and IGN also named the adaptation as one of the best anime of the 2010s. At the Crunchyroll Anime Awards, the adaptation was nominated for Anime of the Year in 2016 and the film My Hero Academia: Two Heroes won the award for Best Film in 2018. He also won Best International Director at Lusca Fantastic Film Fest in 2018. Nagasaki along with Naomi Nakayama, were nominated in Best Director for its eighth and final season, which ultimately becoming the first concluding season of any series to win Anime of the Year at the 10th Crunchyroll Anime Awards in 2026.

== Works ==
=== Television series ===
- Monster (2004–2005) (episode director)
- Akagi: Yami ni Oritatta Tensai (アカギ 〜闇に降り立った天才〜) (2005) (episode 4 director)
- Star Driver (STAR DRIVER 輝きのタクト, Star Driver: Kagayaki no Takuto) (2010–2011) (episode storyboards)
- No. 6 (2011) (director)
- Gundam Build Fighters (ガンダムビルドファイターズ, Gandamu Birudo Faitāzu) (2013–2014) (director)
- Classroom Crisis (2015) (director)
- My Hero Academia (僕のヒーローアカデミア, Boku no Hīrō Akademia) (2016–2025) (director)

=== Films ===
- My Hero Academia: Two Heroes (僕のヒーローアカデミア THE MOVIE ～2人の英雄(ヒーロー)～, Boku no Hīrō Academia THE MOVIE: Futari no Hīrō) (2018) (director)
- My Hero Academia: Heroes Rising (僕のヒーローアカデミア THE MOVIE ヒーローズ:ライジング, Boku no Hīrō Akademia Za Mūbī: Hīrōzu: Raijingu) (2019) (director)
- My Hero Academia: World Heroes' Mission (僕のヒーローアカデミア THE MOVIE ワールドヒーローズミッション, Boku no Hīrō Akademia Za Mūbī Wārudo Hīrōzu Misshon) (2021) (director)

=== Video games ===
- Phoenix Wright: Ace Attorney – Dual Destinies (逆転裁判 5, Gyakuten Saiban 5) (2013) (cutscene director)
