= Kei Shindō =

Japanese voice actress (born September 10)

- 真堂 圭
- Born: Kei Saitō; September 10; Chiba Prefecture, Japan
- Occupation: Voice actress
- Years active: 2004–present
- Agent: Axlone
- Height: 151 cm (4 ft 11 in)

Kei Shindō (真堂 圭, Shindō Kei; born September 10) is a Japanese voice actress. Her major roles include Kyoka Jiro in My Hero Academia, Gentoku in Ikki Tousen, Anzu in Hanamaru Kindergarten, Kuro Kagami in Kodomo no Jikan, and Naomasa in Horizon in the Middle of Nowhere. In video games she voices Mian in Dream Club, Rionera in Atelier Rorona: The Alchemist of Arland, and Tamaki in Code 18.

== Filmography ==
=== Anime ===
List of voice performances in anime
Year	Title	Role	Notes	Ref.
2004	Bleach	Mai Suzuki		
2005	Glass Mask	Ruri Egawa	2nd TV series	
2005	Speed Grapher	Kagura Tennosu		
2005	Shuffle!	Schoolgirl	Also Memories	
2005	Fushigiboshi no Futagohime	Mainesy Bird, Konachi Bird, Bikane Bird	episode 24	
2005	Hell Girl	Aya's follower		
2005	SoltyRei	Chuka Musume		
2006	Wan Wan Celeb Soreyuke! Tetsunoshin	Rumi Inuyama		
2006	Love Get Chu	Mayu Kawamura		
2006	Yume Tsukai	Rinko Mishima		
2006	Night Head Genesis	Tomomi Amamoto		
2006	Marginal Prince	Young Alfred		
2006	Hell Girl 2	Emi Motegi		
2006	Otoboku: Maidens Are Falling For Me!	Kei Takanashi		
2007	Gakuen Utopia Manabi Straight!	Seioh Gakuen Student A		
2007–10	Ikki Tousen series	Gentoku Ryuubi	Starting with Dragon Destiny	
2007	Ancient Ruler Dinosaur King DKidz Adventure	Fumi Hosokawa 細川フミ		
2007	Oh! Edo Rocket	Onui		
2007	Kaze no Stigma	Tiana		
2007	Princess Resurrection	Schoolgirl		
2007–11	Kodomo no Jikan series	Kuro Kagami	OVAs, TV series	
2007	Bamboo Blade	Konatsu Harada		
2007–08	Mobile Suit Gundam 00	Wang Liu Mei, Yaeru		
2007	Kodomo no Jikan	Kagami Kuro		
2007	Strait Jacket	Karupeta Fernandez	OVA, also film version in 2008	
2007	Ayakashi	Noriko Hanai		
2008	Rosario + Vampire	Female attendant		
2008	Shima Shima Tora no Shimajirou	Yuni-kun	Episode 720	
2008	Nabari no Ou	Shiratama, Shiijima Kurokano		
2008	S · A: Special A	Class 1 Girl		
2008	Zettai Karen Children	Sayo		
2008	Kite Liberator	Aitsuki Noguchi	OVA	
2008	Junjo Romantica: Pure Romance	Teacher		
2008	Code-E: Mission-E	Mel		
2008	Ranma ½: Nightmare! Incense of Deep Sleep		OVA	resume
2008	Little Village People	Iko		
2008	Rosario + Vampire Capu2	Shijimi Chouno		
2008	Magician's Academy	Haruka Okariya		
2008	Skip Beat!	Part-time Girl		
2008	Chaos;Head (anime)	Friend		
2009	Maria-sama ga Miteru	Atsuko	season 4	
2009	Umi Monogatari: Anata ga Ite Kureta Koto	Porcupine fish beauty soldier sister ハリセンボン美女兵士姉		
2009	Fight Ippatsu! Jūden-chan!!	Taako		
2009	Umineko: When They Cry	Student		
2009	Needless	Kana, Natsuki		
2009	Aika Zero	Manami	OVA	
2009	Student Council's Discretion	Newspaper staff		
2009	Kobato.	Marina		
2009	Darker than Black: Gemini of the Meteor	Berniece		
2009–15	Tamagotchi series	Lovelitchi, others		
2010	Omamori Himari	Shizuku		
2010	Hanamaru Kindergarten	Anzu		
2010	Metal Fight Beyblade vs. the Sun 劇場版メタルファイト ベイブレードVS太陽 灼熱の侵略者ソルブレイズ	Madoka Amano	OVA	resume
2010	Fujoshi no hinkaku 腐女子の品格	Fujoko	OVA	
2011	Little Battlers Experience	Rico Yazawa		
2011	No. 6	Inukashi		
2011–12	Horizon in the Middle of Nowhere series	Naomasa		
2012	The Knight in the Area	Mito Aizawa		
2012	Queen's Blade Rebellion	Sainyang		
2012	Natsuiro Kiseki	Natsumi's Little Brother		
2012	Saki Achiga-hen episode of Side-A	Tamago Utsugi		
2012	OniAi	Akina		
2012	Medaka Box Abnormal	Zenkichi Hitoyoshi (2 years)		
2013	Hakkenden: Tōhō Hakken Ibun 2	Saki		
2013	Muromi-san	Mana-chan	OVA	
2013	Gaist Crusher	Jipu		
2013	Magi: The Kingdom of Magic	Oruba		
2013	Galilei Donna	Hazuki Ferrari		
2014	Wizard Barristers	Natsuna Hotaru		
2014	Blade & Soul	Seto		
2014	Bakumatsu Rock	Ono		
2015	The Rolling Girls	Noriko Suzuki		
2015	My Love Story!!	Woman		
2016–25	My Hero Academia	Kyōka Jirō, Kinoko Komori, Fuyumi Todoroki, Shoto Todoroki (young)		
2016	Kamiwaza Wanda	Shuu		
2016	Pocket Monsters: Sun & Moon	Lillie		
2017	Fate/Apocrypha	Assassin of Red/Semiramis		
2017	Nintama Rantarō	Botan		resume
2018	Shin Buddyfight / Future Card Buddyfight Ace	Ranma Kakogawa		
2018	Overlord	Arche Eeb Rile Furt/Entoma Vasilissa Zeta	Season 3	
2018	A Certain Magical Index III	Carrisa		
2019	Pocket Monsters (2019)	Lillie		
2020	Plunderer	Yi Yan Shallow		
2021	Shaman King	Marion Phauna		
2022	Aoashi	Miyako Tachibana		
2022	Pocket Monsters (2019)	Lillie		
2023	Pokémon Horizons: The Series	Molly		

=== Film ===
List of voice performances in feature films
Year	Title	Role	Notes	Ref.
2009	Pokémon: Arceus and the Jewel of Life	Kako, Chikorita		
2011	Crayon Shin-chan: The Storm Called: Operation Golden Spy	Female college student		
2015	Pokémon the Movie: Hoopa and the Clash of Ages	Kopu	OVA	

=== Video games ===
List of voice performances in video games
Year	Title	Role	Notes	Ref.
2006	Summon Night 4	Erika		resume
2007	Ikki Tousen Shining Dragon	Gentoku Ryuubi	PS1/PS2	
2008	Ikki Tousen Eloquent Fist	Gentoku Ryuubi	PSP	
2008	Cooking Mama: World Kitchen	Sakura	Wii	
2009	Bamboo Blade: Sorekara no Chousen	Konatsu Harada	PSP	
2009	Atelier Rorona: The Alchemist of Arland	Rionera Heinze	Also later ports in 2013 and Plus in 2015	
2009–10	Dream Club series	Mian	Xbox360	
2009	PokéPark Wii: Pikachu's Adventure			resume
2010	Abyss of the Sacrifice	Miki	PSP	
2010	Pokémon Ranger: Guardian Signs	Ukulele Pichu		
2010	Ikki Tousen Xross Impact	Gentoku Ryuubi	PSP	
2010	Tamagotchi no Narikiri Challenge たまごっちのなりきりチャレンジ	Raburitchi		resume
2011	Dream Club Zero	Mian	Xbox 360	
2011	Code 18	Tamaki Tachikawa 舘川珠姫		
2012–13	Root Double: Before Crime * After Days	Saryu (Sannomiya Louise Yui)	Also Xtend edition	
2013	Horizon in the Middle of Nowhere Portable	Naomasa	PSP	
2014	Bakumatsu Rock: Ultra Soul	Ono		
2016	Girl Friend Beta	Ibuki Fukita	Smartphone	
2018	Fate/Grand Order	Semiramis	Android	
2019	Atelier Lulua: The Scion of Arland	Lionela Heinze	PS4, Switch, PC	
2020	World's End Club	Nyoro	iOS, Switch	
2020	Arknights	Asbestos	Android, iOS	
2020	Maria-sama ga Miteru: Cherry Blossom	Atsuko		resume
2020	Otome wa Boku ni Koishiteru	Kotoriasobu Kei 小鳥遊圭		resume
2020	Speed Grapher 〜大冗談・スピードグラファー〜	Kagura Tennosu		resume
2020	My Hero: One's Justice	Kyōka Jirō	PC, PlayStation 4, Xbox One, Nintendo Switch	
2020	Olympia Soirée: Catharsis	Kairi		
2021	World's End Club	Nyoro		
2021	Cookie Run: Kingdom	Squid Ink Cookie	Android, iOS	
2022	Path to Nowhere	Cabernet		
2023	Takt op. Symphony	Autumn		
2024	Emberstoria	Gwyn'rine		
2026	My Hero Academia: All's Justice	Kyoka Jiro		
2026	Neverness to Everness	Fadia	PlayStation 5, PC, Android, iOS	

=== Dubbing ===
List of dub performances in overseas dubs
Title	Role	Notes	Ref.
Criminal Minds	Nina Hale	Season 4	
Damages	Erica	Season 2	
Mya Go	Ruby		
Desperate Housewives		Season 4	
Heroes	Alice		

=== Audio recordings ===
List of voice performances in audio recordings, dramas, and radio
Title	Role	Notes	Ref.
Ayakashi	Hanai Noriko	drama	
Dream Club		Character singles, radio	
Himepara	Aruto Farōzu Torekuwaazu	Drama CD	
Kodomo no Jikan		Character singles, dramas, talk CDs	
Omamori Himari	Shizuku	Character singles, dramas, talk CDs	

=== Other roles ===
List of voice performances in other media
Title	Role	Notes	Ref.
Dream Club Pure Songs Clips	Mian	video clips	
Stardust Wink スターダスト★ウインク	Rui Arisaka	vomic	
お嬢様はお嫁様。	Camelia	vomic	
保健室の死神	Shinya Kaburagi	vomic	
