= Tōru Nara =

Japanese voice actor (born May 7)

- 奈良 徹
- Born: May 7 Shiraoka, Saitama, Japan
- Occupation: Voice actor
- Years active: 2000-present
- Agent: Kenyu Office
- Height: 168 cm (5 ft 6 in)

Tōru Nara (奈良 徹, Nara Tōru; born May 7) is a Japanese voice actor affiliated with Kenyu Office.

== Biography ==
Nara was born on May 7 in Shiraoka, Saitama.

== Filmography ==
=== Anime ===
- Ace Attorney as Masashi Yahari (Larry Butz)
- Allison & Lillia as Pilot (ep 15)
- Aria the Natural as Akatsuki's brother (senior high) (ep 22)
- Attack on Titan as Koslow
- Bakkyuu HIT! Crash Bedaman as Masao
- Bastard!! -Heavy Metal, Dark Fantasy- as Kevidubu
- BECK: Mongolian Chop Squad as Yuji Sakurai/Saku
- Beyblade Burst as Hoji Konda
- Black Lagoon as Kageyama's Son (ep 2)
- Blade of the Immortal -Immortal- as Shira
- Boruto: Naruto Next Generations as Hassaku Onomichi
- Btooom! as Sōichi Natsume; Yoshiaki Imagawa
- Cap Kakumei Bottleman DX as Seimei Usami
- Cardfight!! Vanguard as Ishida Naoki
- Chihayafuru as Yūsei Nishida
- Cross Game as Takuro Oikawa
- Danball Senki as Kensuke Yuuki
- Delicious in Dungeon as Kuro
- Dorohedoro as Matsumura
- Dragon Quest: The Adventure of Dai as Flazzard
- The Elusive Samurai as Furan
- Fullmetal Alchemist: Brotherhood as Neil
- Hayate the Combat Butler as Gilbert Kent; Koi Herpes phantom (ep 32); Makita; Male customer (ep 24); Younger brother (eps 1–2, 6)
- Himawari! as Sukarabe (ep 9)
- Hunter × Hunter (2011) as Gido
- Inazuma Eleven as Chae Chan-soo; Shishido Sakichi
- Inazuma Eleven Go as Amagi Daichi
- Insect Land as Gabriel
- JoJo's Bizarre Adventure: Phantom Blood (movie) as Blueford
- JoJo's Bizarre Adventure: Stardust Crusaders as Nukesaku
- JoJo's Bizarre Adventure: Stone Ocean as Thunder McQueen
- Jormungand Scarecrow
- Kaiji: Against All Rules as Kitagawa, additional voices
- Kekkaishi as Oudou
- Kiba as Arthur (ep 10); Claude (ep 7); Corva; Keith (eps 5–6); Male Customer (ep 3); (ep 15); Police D (ep 1); Rebel C (ep 11); Sage 5 (eps 4, 8); Soldier 2 (ep 16)
- Kirby of the Stars as Students, Boney
- Letter Bee as Vincent Alcott (ep 11)
- Mahō Tsukai ni Taisetsu na Koto: Natsu no Sora as Seiko Suzuki
- Mahoraba ~Heartful days~ as Movie man (ep 11); Sakata (ep 25)
- Mahojin Guru Guru (3rd) as Kasegi (ep 1–2, 24)
- Mix as Takumi Nishimura
- My Hero Academia as Rikidō Satō
- Naruto as Jiraiya (child); Konoha Anbu Ninja 6
- Naruto Shippūden as Jiraiya (Young)
- One Outs as American Soldier B (ep 1)
- Paradise Kiss as Konishi (Tokumori's friend)
- PetoPeto-san as Man A (eps 9–10)
- Pocket Monsters: Diamond & Pearl as Ouba (5 episodes eps 165–166, 179–180, 191)
- Pocket Monsters XY as Nikola
- Pumpkin Scissors as Alan
- Rin-ne as Cast of Haunted House (ep 65)
- Saint Seiya: Soul of Gold as Grani Sigmund
- Shikabane Hime: Aka as Hiroshige Ushijima
- Shikabane Hime: Kuro as Hiroshige Ushijima
- Skip Beat! as Shin'ichi Ishibashi
- Souten no Ken as 5th Star
- Suite PreCure as Falsetto
- The Ghost in the Shell as Saito
- Tsukumogami Kashimasu as Notetsu
- The Wrong Way to Use Healing Magic as Alec
- Yōkai Watch as Konbu-San, Gorōta "Kuma" Kumashira, Semimaru & Ittangomen
- Yo-kai Watch Shadowside as Bourei Banchou
- Zoids Wild as Caviar
- Zombie Land Saga as Shinta Okoba

=== Video games ===
- Project X Zone as Dokumezu
- Project X Zone 2 as Dokumezu, Nemesis-T Type
- Super Robot Taisen OG Saga: Endless Frontier as Dokumezu
- Super Street Fighter IV as T. Hawk

=== Drama CD ===
- Yuiga Dokuson na Otoko as Mikami

=== Dubbing roles ===
==== Live-action ====
- Zach Galifianakis
  - The Hangover – Alan Garner
  - The Hangover Part II – Alan Garner
  - The Hangover Part III – Alan Garner
  - Between Two Ferns: The Movie – Zach Galifianakis
- Jonah Hill
  - 21 Jump Street – Morton Schmidt
  - 22 Jump Street – Morton Schmidt
  - War Dogs – Efraim Diveroli
  - Don't Look Up – Jason Orlean
- 10,000 BC (2011 TV Asahi edition) – Catan
- All Eyez on Me – Tupac Shakur (Demetrius Shipp Jr.)
- Doctor Sleep – Dave Stone (Zackary Momoh)
- FlashForward – Dr. Simon Campos (Dominic Monaghan)
- The Good Lie – Mamere (Arnold Oceng)
- How She Move – Bishop (Dwain Murphy)
- The Hungover Games – Zach (Herbert Russell)
- Mad Max: Fury Road – Slit (Josh Helman)
- Midway – Bruno Gaido (Nick Jonas)
- A Nightmare on Elm Street – Quentin Smith (Kyle Gallner)
- Sympathy for Mr. Vengeance – Delivery Person (Ryoo Seung-wan)
- True Detective – Detective Maynard Gilbough (Michael Potts)
- The Vampire Diaries – Matt Donovan (Zach Roerig)

==== Animation ====
- Bluey – Bandit Heeler
- Gravity Falls – The Love God
- The Lord of the Rings: The War of the Rohirrim – Wild Warrior
- Sing – Norman
- Sing 2 – Norman
