= My Hero Academia (TV series) =

Japanese anime television series

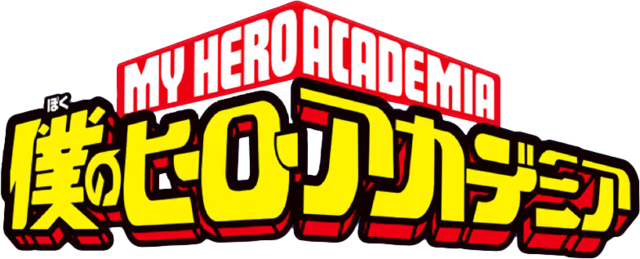
- 僕のヒーローアカデミア; Boku no Hīrō Akademia
- Type: TV series
- Genre: Adventure; Science fantasy; Superhero
- Based on: My Hero Academia
- Created by: Kōhei Horikoshi
- Directed by: Kenji Nagasaki (Note: Credited as director for seasons 1–3 and as chief director (総監督) for seasons 4–8); Tomo Ōkubo (#39–51) (Note: Credited as chief unit director (チーフ演出) for episodes 39–51 (the first half of season 3)); Masahiro Mukai (S4–6); Naomi Nakayama (S7–8)
- Series composition: Yōsuke Kuroda
- Screenplay by: Yōsuke Kuroda
- Character designers: Yoshihiko Umakoshi; Hitomi Odashima (S5–8)
- Music by: Yuki Hayashi
- Voices of: Daiki Yamashita; Nobuhiko Okamoto; Ayane Sakura; Yūki Kaji; Kenta Miyake; Koki Uchiyama
- Narrated by: Hiroyuki Yoshino (exposition); Daiki Yamashita (retrospection)
- Country of origin: Japan
- Original language: Japanese
- No. of seasons: 8
- No. of episodes: 170 + Sp. (Note: A bonus television special set 8 years after the main events of the series; It is officially designated as "170+1") (list of episodes)

Production
- Art directors: Yukiko Murayama; Shigemi Ikeda (Note: Ikeda was posthumously credited in season 8, as he died before it was released.)
- Sound director: Masafumi Mima
- Cinematographers: Masataka Ikegami (S1–3); Takafumi Sawa (S4–8)
- Color designer: Kazuko Kikuchi
- CG directors: Kōki Ōta (#1–31); Yōta Andō (#32–170)
- Editor: Kumiko Sakamoto
- Studio: Bones (Note: Credited as Bones Film for season 8)
- Producers: List: Kazumasa Sanjōba (S1–5); Wakana Okamura (S1–4); Natsumi Mori (S1–2); Hiroshi Kamei (S1); Naoki Amano (S1); Hirokazu Hara (S1); Hayato Saga (S2–7) (Note: This producer was not credited from episodes 51–63 during this stretch.); Yoshihiro Ōyabu (#14–101); Kōji Nagai (S2–4); Hiroya Nakata (S5–8); Mirei Tsumura (S5–7); Sōkichi Onoda (S5); Sōichirō Saitō (S6); Fumi Miura (S7–8); Ryouta Katou (S7); Lu Xiana (S7); Genki Ito (S8); Yurie Uehara (S8); Anna Kondo (S8)
- Production companies: My Hero Academia Production Committee (Note: Label consisting of numerous companies); MBS (S1)
- Runtime: 23–24 minutes

Original release
- Networks: MBS, TBS (S1); ytv, NTV (S2–8)
- Release: April 3, 2016 – December 13, 2025 (Note: The bonus television special aired on May 2, 2026.)

Related
- Original video animation
- Directed by: List: Satoshi Takafuji (#1); Ikurō Satō (#2, 5, 7); Kenji Nagasaki (#3, 6); Shōji Ikeno (#4); Masashi Abe (#8); Tsuyoshi Tobita (#9); Tensai Okamura (#10); Tomo Ōkubo (#11)
- Written by: Yōsuke Kuroda
- Music by: Yuki Hayashi
- Studio: Bones (Note: Credited as Bones Film for the final two OVAs)
- Licensed by: Crunchyroll
- Released: November 27, 2016 – July 4, 2026
- Runtime: 3–23 minutes
- Episodes: 11
- Films
- Two Heroes (2018); Heroes Rising (2019); World Heroes' Mission (2021); You're Next (2024)
- Spin-off
- My Hero Academia: Vigilantes (2025–2026)

My Hero Academia (Japanese: 僕のヒーローアカデミア, Hepburn: Boku no Hīrō Akademia) is a Japanese anime television series produced by Bones, based on the manga series My Hero Academia by Kōhei Horikoshi. The series follows Izuku Midoriya, a boy who dreams of becoming a superhero while training at a high school specializing in it. It aired 170 episodes across a total of eight seasons from April 3, 2016, to December 13, 2025.

The first season of the series premiered on Mainichi Broadcasting System, TBS Television and their JNN affiliates, while from the second season onwards it aired on Yomiuri TV, Nippon TV and their NNS affiliates until its eighth and final season. In North America, the series is licensed by Crunchyroll, LLC. The series also aired an English dub in the United States on Adult Swim's Toonami programming block up until its sixth season.

The anime has also received four animated films, subtitled Two Heroes, Heroes Rising, World Heroes' Mission, and You're Next, along with eleven original video animations (OVAs) and a television special that adapts a bonus chapter from the final volume of the manga, which aired on May 2, 2026.

The series received praise for its animation, music, pacing, action sequences, and voice acting in both Japanese and English versions, as well as numerous awards. It is considered by many to be one of the most notable anime titles from the 2010s.

== Plot ==
Set in a world where superpowers (called "Quirks") have become commonplace, the story follows Izuku Midoriya, a boy who was born without a Quirk but still dreams of becoming a superhero himself. He is scouted by the world's greatest hero, All Might, who bestows his Quirk to Midoriya after recognizing his potential, and helps to enroll him in U.A. High School, a prestigious high school for superheroes in training.

== Series overview ==
Season	Episodes	Originally released	
Season	Episodes	First released	Last released
1	13	April 3, 2016	June 26, 2016
2	25	April 1, 2017	September 30, 2017
3	25	April 7, 2018	September 29, 2018
4	25	October 12, 2019	April 4, 2020
5	25	March 27, 2021	September 25, 2021
6	25	October 1, 2022	March 25, 2023
7	21	May 4, 2024	October 12, 2024
8	11	October 4, 2025	December 13, 2025
Bonus special		May 2, 2026	

== Cast and characters ==
Character	Japanese	English
Izuku Midoriya / Deku	Daiki Yamashita; Akeno Watanabe (child)	Justin Briner; Lara Woodhull (child)
Katsuki Bakugo / Dynamight	Nobuhiko Okamoto; Sachi Kokuryu (child)	Clifford Chapin; Kate Oxley (child)
Ochaco Uraraka / Uravity	Ayane Sakura	Luci Christian
Shōto Todoroki / Shōto	Yuki Kaji; Kei Shindō (child)	David Matranga; Mikaela Krantz (child)
Tenya Īda / Ingenium	Kaito Ishikawa	J. Michael Tatum
Momo Yaoyorozu / Creati	Marina Inoue	Colleen Clinkenbeard
Eijiro Kirishima / Red Riot	Toshiki Masuda	Justin Cook
Tsuyu Asui / Froppy	Aoi Yūki	Monica Rial
Minoru Mineta / Grape Juice	Ryō Hirohashi	Brina Palencia
Denki Kaminari / Chargebolt	Tasuku Hatanaka	Kyle Phillips
Kyōka Jirō / Earphone Jack	Kei Shindō	Trina Nishimura
Mina Ashido / Pinky	Eri Kitamura	Caitlin Glass
Fumikage Tokoyami / Tsukuyomi	Yoshimasa Hosoya	Jessie James Grelle
Yuga Aoyama / Can't Stop Twinkling	Kosuke Kowano	Joel McDonald
Mezo Shoji / Tentacole	Masakazu Nishida	Ian Sinclair
Mashirao Ojiro / Tailman	Kosuke Miyoshi	Mike McFarland
Hanta Sero / Cellophane	Kiyotaka Furushima	Christopher Bevins
Toru Hagakure / Invisible Girl	Kaori Nazuka	Felecia Angelle
Rikido Sato / Sugarman	Toru Nara	Cris George
Koji Koda / Anima	Takuma Nagatsuka	Greg Ayres
Hitoshi Shinso / Nighthide	Wataru Hatano	Jarrod Greene
Neito Monoma / Phantom Thief	Kōhei Amasaki	Austin Tindle
Itsuka Kendō / Battle Fist	Saki Ogasawara	Jad Saxton
Tetsutetsu Tetsutetsu / Real Steel	Kōji Okino	David Wald
Mei Hatsume	Azu Sakura	Alexis Tipton
Mirio Togata / Lemillion	Tarusuke Shingaki; Wakana Minami (child)	Ricco Fajardo; Megan Shipman (child)
Tamaki Amajiki / Suneater	Yūto Uemura	Aaron Dismuke; Apphia Yu (child)
Nejire Hado / Nejire Chan	Kiyono Yasuno	Lindsay Seidel
Toshinori Yagi / All Might	Kenta Miyake	Christopher Sabat
Shota Aizawa / Eraser Head	Junichi Suwabe	Alex Organ (S1); Christopher Wehkamp (S2–8)
Hizashi Yamada / Present Mic	Hiroyuki Yoshino	Sonny Strait (#1–16); Dave Trosko (#17–170)
Nezu	Yasuhiro Takato	Jerry Jewell
Nemuri Kayama / Midnight	Akeno Watanabe	Elizabeth Maxwell
Anan Kurose / Thirteen	Inuko Inuyama	Morgan Berry
Ken Ishiyama / Cementoss	Kenta Ōkuma	Chris Rager
Chiyo Shuzenji / Recovery Girl	Etsuko Kozakura	Juli Erickson (S1); Luci Christian (S2–8)
Enji Todoroki / Endeavor	Tetsu Inada	Patrick Seitz
Keigo Takami / Hawks	Yuichi Nakamura	Zeno Robinson
Tsunagu Hakamada / Best Jeanist	Hikaru Midorikawa	Micah Solusod
Shinya Kamihara / Edgeshot	Kenta Kamakari	John Burgmeier
Shinji Nishiya / Kamui Woods	Masamichi Kitada	Aaron Roberts
Yu Takeyama / Mt. Lady	Kaori Nazuka	Jamie Marchi
Rumi Usagiyama / Mirko	Sayaka Kinoshita	Anairis Quiñones
Ryuko Tatsuma / Ryukyu	Kaori Yagi	Katelyn Barr
Kugo Sakamata / Gang Orca	Shuhei Matsuda	Tyler Walker
Mirai Sakaki / Sir Nighteye	Shin-ichiro Miki	Brandon McInnis
Taishiro Toyomitsu / Fat Gum	Kazuyuki Okitsu	Kyle Hebert
Masaki Mizushima / Manual	Kenta Ōkuma	Ethan Gallardo
Ken Takagi / Rock Lock	Yasuhiro	Gabe Kunda
Sorahiko Torino / Gran Torino	Kenichi Ogata; Masamichi Kitada (young)	Charles Campbell
Inko Midoriya	Aya Kawakami	Jessica Cavanagh
Kota Izumi	Michiru Yamazaki	Cassandra Lee Morris
Eri	Seiran Kobayashi	Emily Neves
Rei Todoroki	Michiko Neya	Morgan Garrett
Fuyumi Todoroki	Kei Shindō	Kate Oxley
Natsuo Todoroki	Yuuki Shin	Adam Gibbs; Kimmie Britt (young)
Naomasa Tsukauchi / True Man	Tokuyoshi Kawashima	Alejandro Saab
Tenko Shimura / Tomura Shigaraki	Koki Uchiyama; Arisa Sekine (child)	Eric Vale; Emily Fajardo (child)
Zen Shigaraki / All For One	Akio Otsuka; Hiroshi Kamiya (young)	John Swasey; Ryan Negrón (young)
Oboro Shirakumo / Loud Cloud / Kurogiri	Takahiro Fujiwara (Kurogiri); Kensho Ono (Oboro Shirakumo/Loud Cloud)	Chuck Huber (Kurogiri); Stephen Sanders (Oboro Shirakumo/Loud Cloud)
Dr. Kyudai Garaki / Daruma Ujiko	Minoru Inaba	Mark Stoddard
Toya Todoroki / Dabi	Hiro Shimono; Ryoko Shiraishi (child)	Jason Liebrecht; Sara Ragsdale (child)
Himiko Toga	Misato Fukuen	Leah Clark
Jin Bubaigawara / Twice	Daichi Endō	Newton Pittman
Atsuhiro Sako / Mr. Compress	Tsuguo Mogami	Kent Williams
Shuichi Iguchi / Spinner	Ryō Iwasaki	Larry Brantley
Gigantomachia	Yasuhiro Mamiya	Cris George
Chizome Akaguro / Stain	Go Inoue	Robert McCollum
Goto Imatsuji / Muscular	Kousuke Takaguchi	Jim Foronda
Kai Chisaki / Overhaul	Kenjiro Tsuda	Kellen Goff; Caitlin Glass (child)
Danjuro Tobita / Gentle Criminal	Koichi Yamadera	John Gremillion
Manami Aiba / La Brava	Yui Horie	Megan Shipman
Kaina Tsutsumi / Lady Nagant	Atsumi Tanezaki	Erica Lindbeck

== Production ==
My Hero Academia producer Wakana Okamura, who previously worked with animation studio Bones on Blood Blockade Battlefront, stated in an interview that he chose to work with Bones on adapting the series because he felt they would make it a "high-quality production" with a "wide reach [both] internationally and domestically". Okamura also stated the production staff, especially character designer Yoshihiko Umakoshi, were fans of the manga. Director Kenji Nagasaki said Bones wanted to "make [the series] with a strong core and backbones". Yōsuke Kuroda said he was a fan of the series prior to its anime adaptation, so he quickly accepted when offered to do the screenwriting.

For the casting, Weekly Shōnen Jump magazine announced that the anime would be starring Daiki Yamashita as Izuku Midoriya, Kenta Miyake as All Might, Nobuhiko Okamoto as Katsuki Bakugo, Ayane Sakura as Ochaco Uraraka, Kaito Ishikawa as Tenya Iida, Aoi Yūki as Tsuyu Asui, Ryō Hirohashi as Minoru Mineta, Marina Inoue as Momo Yaoyorozu, and Yoshimasa Hosoya as Fumikage Tokoyami. In February 2016, Tasuku Hatanaka, Toshiki Masuda and Yuki Kaji joined the cast as Denki Kaminari, Eijirō Kirishima and Shōto Todoroki, respectively. In an interview with Justin Briner and Christopher Sabat, they expressed interest about the English dub in Funimation. Briner, the voice of Izuku, said the dubbing process was more consistent, but also said it felt strange to do it on a regular home video release. Sabat, who voices All Might, felt that even the actors and director were continuing the show without knowing the full story because they had not yet been told what the story was.

During the production for the anime's second season, Umakoshi was impressed by Horikoshi's designs, feeling they were very well-suited for animation. He also stated that in terms of giving the characters more life and movement, all they basically did was simplify the dialogue. He believed that the manga already had a lot of movement before animating. Regarding the fight between Todoroki and Izuku, Umakoshi believed that he was able to develop a story that could not fail by considering which part of the story would be handled by which key animation, and by choosing someone with a high level of skill. He identified certain things and collated who would work best in other parts of the scene. After the airing of an episode, Umakoshi felt that the anime had a great response not only from fans of the manga but also from regular Japanese viewers.

Umakoshi was also looking forward not only the development of the relationship between Deku and All Might, but also between Deku and Bakugo in the future material of the manga, which had not been animated yet. Unlike the other Shonen Jump adaptation titles such as Naruto and One Piece, where the staff worked throughout the year, Umakoshi said the production cycle of My Hero Academia is split into batches. He also said: "Personally, it would be best if I could be working on it continuously, throughout a whole year. But in reality, sometimes it doesn't work out that way, due to different aspects of business and things. But in reality, the schedule did line up so that we worked on the second season right after the first season ended, so I have been working on it somewhat continuously, even if the delivery of the product comes in batches."

== Release ==
In October 2015, the series' official website announced that the manga would receive an anime television series adaptation produced by Bones. The anime is directed by Kenji Nagasaki, written by Yōsuke Kuroda, and features character designs by Yoshihiko Umakoshi. The series' first season aired from April 3 to June 26, 2016, on all JNN affiliate stations, including MBS and TBS. A second season was announced in Weekly Shōnen Jump magazine's 30th issue of 2016. The season aired from April 1 to September 30, 2017, on all NNS affiliate stations, including ytv and NTV, with the staff and cast from the first season reprising their roles. A third season was announced in the 44th issue of Weekly Shōnen Jump magazine of 2017, which aired from April 7 to September 29, 2018.

A fourth season was announced in the final episode of season three. On December 19 of the same year, the series' official website confirmed a new key visual, along with its release date of October 12, 2019, which aired until April 4, 2020. Funimation premiered the first episode of the fourth season at Anime Expo on July 6, 2019, with the English dub. Kenji Nagasaki served as chief director of the fourth season, with Masahiro Mukai as director. A fifth season was announced at the end of the final episode of season four, which aired from March 27 to September 25, 2021.

A sixth season was announced at the end of the fifth season's final episode. On July 24, 2022, the Hero Fes event confirmed a new visual, as well as its release date of October 1, 2022, which ran for two consecutive cours that aired until March 25, 2023; it adapted the manga's "Paranormal Liberation War" and "Dark Hero" story arcs. A seventh season was announced at the end of the sixth season's final episode, which aired from May 4 to October 12, 2024, with four "Memories" recap specials having aired in the preceding month of April. Naomi Nakayama served as the director of the seventh season.

An eighth and final season was announced at the end of the seventh season's final episode. In July 2025, Kōhei Horikoshi was confirmed to being heavily involved in the production, and would provide the new original scenes that were not included in the manga. The season aired from October 4 to December 13, 2025. A bonus television special that adapts chapter 431, which was bundled with the 42nd and final volume of the manga, premiered on May 2, 2026. The special was announced at Jump Festa '26 a week after the series finale aired.

=== Original video animations ===
An original video animation (OVA) based on the anime series was shown at the Jump Festa '16 event on November 27, 2016. Titled "Save! Rescue Training!", it was bundled with the limited edition of the 13th volume of the manga, which released on April 4, 2017. It was later released on DVD releases alongside Black Clover and Food Wars!: Shokugeki no Soma bundled with the future volumes of their respective manga, as it was announced on Jump Special Anime Festa event. A second OVA, titled "Training of the Dead," bundled with a limited edition of the 14th volume of the manga, released on June 2, 2017. It focuses on a joint practice session between Izuku's class and the other hero department students at U.A. Academy. A third OVA, "All Might: Rising," was released on February 13, 2019. It was bundled with the first film's Blu-ray set, and adapted its prequel manga. It was two minutes long.

A two-part original net animation (ONA) titled "Make It! Do-or-Die Survival Training," were released on August 16, 2020, with the returning staff and cast from season 4. Funimation streamed them simultaneously with the Japanese release. An OVA based on the bonus manga chapter "Departure" was included with the "Plus Ultra" edition of My Hero Academia: World Heroes' Mission in Japan. Two new OVA episodes, titled "HLB <Hero League Baseball>" and "Laugh! As If You Are in Hell," were given screenings in Japan from June 16–19, 2022. Internationally, Crunchyroll premiered the episodes at Anime Expo on July 1, 2022. A worldwide streaming release premiered on August 1, 2022.

A special OVA episode, titled "UA Heroes Battle," premiered with an English dub at the New York Comic Con on October 13, 2023. The episode has given screenings in Japan from October 20–26, 2023. Crunchyroll streamed it with English subtitles and dub on November 30 of the same year. An OVA based on the bonus manga chapter "A Piece of Cake" was included with the deluxe "Plus Ultra" edition of My Hero Academia: You're Next in Japan. An OVA short based on the one-shot manga chapter from the Ultra Age fanbook, titled "I Am a Hero Too," was publicly released on August 3, 2026. The OVA received screenings at Anime Expo on July 4, and be screened again at the "Character Match Up" event in Japan on August 1 and 2. Crunchyroll also streamed it with English subtitles and dub on August 2 of the same year.

=== Theatrical films ===
An anime film was announced in December 2017 and features an original story set after the manga's "Final Exam" arc. Titled My Hero Academia: Two Heroes, the film had its world premiere at Anime Expo in Los Angeles on July 5, 2018, before a Japanese theatrical release on August 3, 2018, with the staff and cast from the anime series reprising their roles. The film grossed over $33 million worldwide, and ended its theatrical run with $5.8 million to become the tenth highest-grossing animated film in the United States and Canada at that time.

In March 2019, it was announced that a second animated film for the series was in production. On July 7, 2019, the official Twitter account for My Hero Academia revealed the title as My Hero Academia: Heroes Rising; the film was released in Japan on December 20, 2019. The film takes place after the manga's "Meta Liberation Army" arc. It contains story elements that were once going to be used by Kōhei Horikoshi in the series finale. It was released in North America on February 26, 2020. The film grossed $30 million worldwide, and surpassed My Hero Academia: Two Heroes during its ninth domestic gross weekend.

In November 2020, it was announced that a third animated film for the series was in production. The staff and cast from the previous two films reprised their roles. In the first episode of the series' fifth season, the film was revealed to be titled My Hero Academia: World Heroes' Mission. The film was released in Japan on August 6, 2021, and premiered in the United States and Canada on October 29, 2021. The film grossed over $47 million worldwide, and became the tenth highest-grossing domestic film of 2021 in Japan.

A fourth animated film was announced in August 2023, taking place after the manga's "U.A. Traitor" arc. On January 29, 2024, the film was revealed to be titled My Hero Academia: You're Next. It was released in Japan on August 2, 2024, and began screening in the United States on October 11, 2024. The film grossed over $32 million worldwide, and surpassed My Hero Academia: World Heroes' Mission as the highest-grossing film of the franchise during its tenth weekend. It also became the tenth highest-grossing domestic film of 2024 in Japan.

=== International release ===
In March 2016, Funimation announced they had licensed the international rights for streaming services, the home and broadcast release, and the merchandise rights. Universal Pictures UK distributed the first season in the United Kingdom and Ireland on behalf of Funimation, with Sony Pictures UK distributing the second season for Funimation, and Manga Entertainment distributing subsequent seasons for Funimation. In Australia and New Zealand, Universal Sony Pictures Home Entertainment distributed the first two seasons, on behalf of Funimation, with Madman Entertainment distributing season 3 onwards, in partnership with Funimation. In April 2018, it was announced that the series's English dub would air on Adult Swim's Toonami programming block starting on May 5, 2018. Medialink licensed the series in Southeast Asia. They aired it simultaneously on Animax Asia. In August 2023, Cartoon Network announced that the series would air in India starting on September 10, 2023; it was also set to air on the same television network in Japan. The first two seasons of the series's English dub once again aired in the United States on AXS TV from February 20 to October 3, 2025, as part of Web3 company Azuki's short-lived Anime.com Hour programming block.

== Music ==
The original music of the series is composed by Yuki Hayashi. The series has also used twenty-four different theme songs: twelve opening themes and twelve ending themes. The opening theme "The Day", performed by Porno Graffitti, and the ending theme "Heroes", performed by Brian the Sun, were used for the 13 episodes in the first season. For the second season, the first opening theme is "Peace Sign" (ピースサイン) performed by Kenshi Yonezu and the first ending theme is "Dakara, Hitori ja nai" (だから、ひとりじゃない, Therefore, I am not Alone) performed by Little Glee Monster for the first 13 episodes; from episode 14 onwards, the opening theme is "Sora ni Utaeba" (空に歌えば, Singin' to the Sky) performed by amazarashi and the ending theme is "Datte Atashi no Hīrō" (だってアタシのヒーロー, Still My Hero) performed by LiSA. For the first 13 episodes of the third season, the opening theme is "Odd Future" by Uverworld, while the ending theme is "Update" (アップデート) by miwa. For the rest of the season, the opening theme is "Make my story" by Lenny code fiction and the ending theme is "Long Hope Philia" (ロングホープ・フィリア) by Masaki Suda. For the first 14 episodes of the fourth season, the opening theme is "Polaris" (ポラリス) by Blue Encount, while the ending theme is "Kōkai no Uta" (航海の唄, The Song of the Voyage) by Sayuri. For the rest of the season, the opening theme is "Starmarker" (スターマーカー) by Kana-Boon and the ending theme is "Shout Baby" by Ryokuōshoku Shakai. Kyoka Jiro starring Chrissy Costanza performs the insert songs "Each Goal" in episode 19 and "Hero too" in episode 23, with the former insert song was uncredited, while the latter insert song was credited as the U.A. School Festival track.

For the first 13 episodes of the fifth season, the opening theme is "No.1" by Dish, while the ending theme is "Ashiato" (足跡; lit. 'Footprints') by the Peggies. From episode 14 onwards, the opening theme is "Merry-Go-Round" by Man with a Mission, while the ending theme is "Uso ja Nai" (嘘じゃない; lit. 'Not a Lie') by Soshi Sakiyama. For the first 13 episodes of the sixth season, the opening theme is "Hitamuki" (ひたむき; lit. 'Single-Minded') by Super Beaver, while the ending theme is "Sketch" by Kiro Akiyama. From episode 14 onwards, the opening theme is "Bokurano" (ぼくらの; lit. 'Our') by Eve, while the ending theme is "Kitakaze" (キタカゼ; lit. 'North Wind') by Six Lounge. For the first nine episodes of the seventh season, the opening theme is "Tagatame" (誰我為; lit. 'For Someone's Sake') by TK from Ling Tosite Sigure and the ending theme is "Tsubomi" (蕾; lit. 'Flower Bud') by Omoinotake. From episode ten onwards, the opening theme is "Curtain Call" (カーテンコール) by Yuuri, while the ending theme is "Rokutōsei" (六等星; lit. 'Class 6 Star') by Zarame. For the eighth and final season, the opening theme is "The Revo" by Porno Graffitti, who previously provided the opening theme song "The Day" from the first season, and the ending theme is "I" by Bump of Chicken. Two songs to celebrate the anime's tenth anniversary were released in 2026: the first is "Hero too", which was used as the track for "I Am a Hero Too" OVA short, performed by Eri starring Myka Morton; and the second is "You Say Run" performed by Electric Callboy, with a global release on September 22.

In November 2021, a concert event titled My Hero Academia Official Live Concert was held in Manhattan. Another concert event, titled My Hero Academia Special Film Concert, was held at Arena Tachikawa Tachihi on November 23, 2023. A two-day Plus Ultra concert event featuring the artists and bands from the series, titled Ani-Rock Fes. 2024 My Hero Academia Plus Ultra Live, was held on February 24 and 25, 2024 at Yokohama Arena. The 2026 event to celebrate the anime's tenth anniversary, is set to be held on November 22 and 23 at Yoyogi National Gymnasium. A world tour concert event featuring Yuki Hayashi's music and scenes from the anime, titled "My Hero Academia in Concert", was launched at Pacifico Yokohama on May 30, 2026. The U.S. tour concert were held from September 12–October 25, with a ten-city tour across Europe were performed from September 20–October 1.

== Reception ==
=== Popularity ===
My Hero Academia was popular with Japanese readers of Charapedia, who voted it the fourth best anime show of Q2 2017. The anime received high TV ratings and has consistently ranked among the top ten animated shows in Japan since the release of its second season. The official music video of the second season's opening theme song, "Peace Sign" by Kenshi Yonezu, reached 48.6 million views on YouTube, becoming one of the top trending videos of 2017. The music video from the fourth season, "Hero too" by Kyoka Jiro starring Chrissy Costanza, was viewed more than 100 million times on YouTube, becoming Toho Animation's channel's most viewed video at the time. In the United States, My Hero Academia was the second most "in-demand" TV title in the last 60 days in 2020 according to Observer, which tracks popularity through social media, fan ratings, and piracy. In January 2021, it was revealed that the series was the fourth most-watched anime series on Crunchyroll in 2020, being watched in 23 countries and territories, including North America, Central America, South America, and Europe. In April of the same year, the fifth season of the series set the record for the most-watched premiere of any series on MyAnimeList, surpassing other anime titles such as Attack on Titan: The Final Season, The Promised Neverland season 2, and Dr. Stone: Stone Wars.

According to Video Research, the premiere of its sixth season earned a television rating of 3.9% (an improvement from the previous season's 3.2%) and ranked as the fourth-most watched anime, outperforming other popular series such as One Piece, Spy × Family, and Doraemon in the average household viewership in Japan. The sixth season's fifth episode became one of the most-watched episodes of the series, garnering over 3.01 million viewers across 2.26 million households. Additionally, more than 2.64 million people who watched the anime, was an increase of 325,000 viewers from its season premiere, which had an individual viewership rating of 2.1%. By December 22, 2022, the series ranked as the fifth "Most-Watched Anime in Japan" for December 2022. The sixth season's finale averaged 2.01 million viewers on television after its broadcast.

On Tumblr's Year in Review, which highlights the largest communities, fandoms, and trends on the platform throughout the year, My Hero Academia ranked first in the Top Anime & Manga Shows category from 2018 to 2021. The characters also placed highly in the rankings of the Top Anime & Manga Characters category. In 2019, Izuku Midoriya ranked first, with 17 other spots being occupied by other My Hero Academia characters in the top 50 list; seven were ranked on the top 10 list in 2020; and five in 2021. The series also ranked fifth on Tumblr's Top 10 overall in the 2018 list; it ranked ninth on the Top 20 overall in 2020; and tenth on the Top 21 overall in 2021. It placed seventeenth on Twitter Japan's Trend Awards in 2021, based on the social network's top trending topics of the year.

In April 2024, My Hero Academia was the most popular animated superhero show or franchise according to analyst Miles Atherton, where the data was compiled through social media engagement for the popular new series and its growing popularity for anime. With 4.7 million social media engagements, it was the second most-discussed series, ahead of X-Men '97, Invincible, and KonoSuba in the last 30 days, despite the seventh season having not began airing. After the series' finale, the eighth and final season has an average rating of 9.5/10 on IMDb, while becoming the first full-length anime season to achieve a 9+ rating in every episode, with episode 8 had a 9.9/10 on its premiere day that became at the time, the website's highest-rated TV episode of 2025.

In 2026, My Hero Academia was named by the Guinness World Records and data-science firm Parrot Analytics as the "Most in-demand animated TV show", with a global demand rating 57.5 times greater than that of the average TV show, previously held by Hazbin Hotel.

=== Sales ===
My Hero Academia sales have been high and the series has been successful in Japan since the release of the anime. The five volumes of the first season on Blu-ray and DVD were released in Japan, with each release appearing in Oricon's Animation Blu-ray and Animation DVD ranking. The first Blu-ray edition of My Hero Academia ranked fifth in the first week of Oricon's Blu-ray ranking, while the first DVD edition ranked fourth with 2,184 copies sold. The second Blu-ray and DVD sets also ranked, with the Blu-ray edition coming in sixth and DVD fifth for a week. The third Blu-ray edition ranked fourth with 1,700 copies sold, while the DVD release was eighth with 1,184 copies sold. The fourth Blu-ray and DVD collections ranked fifth and fourth, respectively. The fifth Blu-ray and DVD release sales ranked higher than the previous volumes; the Blu-ray came in at third with 1,473 copies sold and the DVD ranked second with 1,068 copies sold in a week. Four volumes of the second season on Blu-ray and DVD also appeared in Oricon's Animation Blu-ray and DVD ranking. The first Blu-ray edition ranked seventh, while the DVD ranked fifth. The third Blu-ray edition was among the top 20 in Oricon's Animation Blu-ray ranking, while the DVD was tenth among the 30 Animation DVD ranking. The seventh Blu-ray and DVD ranked eighth, while the eighth Blu-ray and DVD sets ranked fourth.

The second season's opening theme, "Peace Sign" by Kenshi Yonezu, topped the Billboard charts on the Billboard Japan Hot 100; it peaked at number two on the Oricon charts. By the end of 2017, the Bootleg soundtrack album including "Peace Sign" became the top-selling anime CD album on Oricon's chart with 241,754 copies sold. It was the top-selling anime CD album in the first half of 2018 with 134,777 copies sold; the other compilation album, LiSA BEST: Day, which includes the second ending theme song of the second season, "Datte Atashi no Hero" by LiSA, ranked fifth on Oricon's chart simultaneously. Seven volumes of the third season on Blu-ray and DVD appeared in Oricon's Animation Blu-ray and DVD ranking, respectively. The first Blu-ray edition ranked ninth, while the DVD ranked third. The second Blu-ray edition ranked sixth, while the DVD ranked fifth. The third Blu-ray edition ranked fourth, while the DVD ranked second. The fourth Blu-ray and DVD sets ranked fifth and sixth, respectively. The fifth Blu-ray set ranked third with 1,194 copies sold, while the DVD ranked second. The seventh Blu-ray and DVD sets ranked ninth and sixth, respectively. The eighth Blu-ray and DVD sets ranked fourth and third, respectively. By the end of 2018, Bootleg became the top-selling anime CD album for the second consecutive year while LiSA BEST: Day ranked ninth on Oricon's chart.

=== Critical reception ===
My Hero Academia was met with positive reviews from critics, and is considered to be one of the best anime series of all time. The series has a rating of 100% on review aggregator Rotten Tomatoes. Alex Osborn of IGN gave the first season a nine out of ten rating, praising its action, story, and characters, while criticizing its villains as underdeveloped. Osborn also stated that "its excellent character design only elevates the memorable cast even further". He concluded that "the first season of My Hero Academia delivers thirteen episodes of fantastic action, elevated by a heartfelt story that's wrapped around a core cast of memorable and relatable characters". In his review for the second season, Osborn praised it as "truly something special", complimenting the animation, character developments, and emotions. He called it as "one of the best TV shows" he had ever watched. Tom Speelman of Polygon praised the anime for its animation, action and characters. Speelman also stated that compared to other superhero teams like X-Men or Legion of Super-Heroes, My Hero Academia's biggest asset is its huge cast, with even minor characters having a "fun look" or "interesting personality" for readers to latch onto. He noted that it has similarities to the other shows and comics like Teen Titans, Runaways, or Young Justice, though he felt its closest thematic analog is the 2005 Disney film Sky High. Chris Beveridge from The Fandom Post also praised the anime. He said that despite it being a long running series, it manages to not feel directionless and has several great moments.

Nick Creamer of Anime News Network also praised the adaptation. He gave praise to the music and animation in the action scenes, while criticizing the pacing and stating that the animation can be average at times. In his review of the second season, he gave it praise for the improvements to both pacing and animation. Sam Leach of Anime News Network highlighted the 49th episode, which is the second battle between All Might and All For One. Leach wrote: "It was unavoidable that this was going to be a beautiful episode. That bloodied-up All Might is striking in either form, and you can tell they pulled out all the stops in making the big hits as intense and crazy as possible. From a pacing perspective, I'm really pleased with how this Bakugo Rescue arc played out." He concluded: "This is My Hero Academia's proudest moment in the spotlight. Not only does it continue to be the darling of modern Shonen Jump with one of the mostly perfectly tuned anime adaptations a long-running series has ever received, this is an accomplishment of storytelling across the board." Marina Garrow from Anime Feminist praised the way the plot handles damsel-in-distress elements, especially when compared to other shōnen series, stating that the female characters are not the only characters that need saving, and when they do need saving, the situations are realistic and not overexaggerated.

Both the original Japanese cast and the English dub received praise from critics. Osborn applauded the casting choices and overall voice work, adding that Izuku's voice actor Daiki Yamashita is a "perfect fit" in the Japanese dub, while praising Justin Briner's performance in English as excellent and standout. Creamer rated both equally, stating that the dub cast of the major characters generally fits their roles very well, though criticizing some of the background characters' performances. Andy Hanley from UK Anime Network concured, stating both casts had strong performances; however, he gave special praise to the dub cast, saying that each actor fits their role very well. Speelman stated that both Japanese and English casts know exactly how to make these roles work. He noted that both Yamashita and Briner's voice as Izuku "nail the optimistic nerdiness and heroic attitude", with Briner "channeling a bit of Morty Smith for good measure". He also praised the voice performances of All Might, noting that Japanese voice actor Kenta Miyake "nails the goofy earnestness of the part", while English voice actor Christopher Sabat "was essentially Superman", Speelman felt was a "great fit".

The eighth and final season received critical acclaim for its animation, direction, character arcs (specifically Bakugo), voice performances, and emotional depth, although the pacing and narrative choices received some criticism. Elijah Gonzalez of The A.V. Club gave the final season an A−, praising its action sequences, animation, execution, and the emotional finale, while describing the ten-year series' run as "an excellent capstone to the 170-episode journey" despite the meandering middle seasons. Writing for Polygon, Francesco Cacciatore found that the anime delivered the satisfying conclusion in a way that many series failed to achieve by expanding scenes from the original manga, which was initially controversial among fans. He also called every episode in the final season as "flawless". In his additional review, regarding the "More" special episode, Francesco applauded studio Bones Film for tying up the loose ends that fits the story's message perfectly. Panos Kotzathanasis of Asian Movie Pulse praised the final season for its animation, action, and the epilogue scenes, while criticizing the extensive flashbacks and "saving the villains" trope.

The anime series has been named as one of the best of the 2010s in several publications. Writing for Comic Book Resources, Sage Ashford ranked it fourth on his list, praising its character development. Although he criticized the series' perceived lack of originality, he felt it executes the classic shōnen tropes perfectly, describing it as the "most finely tuned battle shonen ever created". Paste and Men's Health named the series as one of the best anime of all time. In November 2019, Polygon named it as one of the best anime of the 2010s, and Crunchyroll listed it in their "Top 25 best anime of the 2010s". In January 2020, IGN and Thrillist named it among the best anime series of the 2010s. Japan Web Magazine ranked the series 24th on its list of "30 Best Anime of All Time".

=== Accolades ===
At the Crunchyroll's inaugural Anime Awards in 2017, Izuku was awarded "Hero of the Year" while the anime series was nominated in six other categories including "Anime of the Year". In December 2017, the second season of My Hero Academia was among the Top 100 Favorites nominated for Anime of the Year at the Tokyo Anime Award Festival 2018. At the 2nd Crunchyroll Anime Awards in 2018, the season won seven out of ten nominations: Best Action, Best Animation, Best Opening ("Peace Sign"), Best Girl (Ochaco Uraraka), Best Boy (Shoto Todoroki), Best Villain (Stain), and Best Hero (Izuku Midoriya) categories; Christopher Sabat also received the Industry Icon Award for his role as All Might. The anime won "Shonen Series of the Decade" at the Funimation's Decade of Anime poll, where the fans voted for their favorite anime across multiple categories. In the other fan poll, Izuku Midoriya and Shoto Todoroki were chosen as one of the "Best Boys of the Decade", while Ochaco Uraraka became one of the five recipients for the "Best Girls of the Decade" category.

My Hero Academia ranked first in a "mega poll" of the readers for Best Anime of 2017 and 2018 by Anime News Network. In 2021, the series won the "Most In-Demand Anime Series of 2020" at the third Global TV Demand Awards; it won the same award at the seventh and eighth editions in 2025 and 2026, while being one of the finalists for "Most In-Demand TV Series in the World". In 2023, the series along with Attack on Titan, became the first anime to receive an Astra TV Award nomination for "Best Streaming Animated Series or TV Movie" at the inaugural and only Astra Creative Arts TV Awards edition. At the 10th Crunchyroll Anime Awards, the eighth and final season won four awards including Anime of the Year, which became the first concluding season of an anime series to win the top prize.

=== Awards and nominations ===
Year	Award	Category	Recipient	Result	Ref.
2016	IGN Awards	Best Anime Series	My Hero Academia	Nominated	
2016	IGN Awards	Best Anime Opening	"The Day" by Porno Graffitti	Nominated	
2016	Billboard Japan Music Awards	Hot Animation	"The Day" by Porno Graffitti	15th place	
2017	1st Crunchyroll Anime Awards	Anime of the Year	My Hero Academia	Nominated	
2017	1st Crunchyroll Anime Awards	Hero of the Year	Izuku "Deku" Midoriya	Won	
2017	1st Crunchyroll Anime Awards	Villain of the Year	Tomura Shigaraki	Nominated	
2017	1st Crunchyroll Anime Awards	Best Boy	Izuku "Deku" Midoriya	Nominated	
2017	1st Crunchyroll Anime Awards	Best Girl	Ochaco Uraraka	Nominated	
2017	1st Crunchyroll Anime Awards	Best Action	My Hero Academia	Nominated	
2017	1st Crunchyroll Anime Awards	Best Fight Scene	Deku vs. Kacchan	Nominated	
2017	Japan Expo Awards	Daruma for Best Simulcast	My Hero Academia	Nominated	
2017	12th AnimaniA Awards	Best Online Anime	My Hero Academia	3rd place	
2017	Billboard Japan Music Awards	Hot 100	"Peace Sign" by Kenshi Yonezu	14th place	
2017	Billboard Japan Music Awards	Most Downloaded Songs	"Peace Sign" by Kenshi Yonezu	10th place	
2017	Billboard Japan Music Awards	Hot Animation	"Peace Sign" by Kenshi Yonezu	3rd place	
2017	IGN Awards	Anime of the Year	My Hero Academia	Won	
2017	IGN Awards	Anime of the Year - People's Choice	My Hero Academia	Won	
2017	5th BTVA Anime Dub Awards	Best Male Lead	Christopher Sabat as All Might	Nominated	
2017	5th BTVA Anime Dub Awards	Best Male Lead - People's Choice	Christopher Sabat as All Might	Won	
2017	5th BTVA Anime Dub Awards	Best Supporting Male	Alex Organ as Shota Aizawa	Nominated	
2017	5th BTVA Anime Dub Awards	Best Vocal Ensemble	My Hero Academia	Won	
2017	5th BTVA Anime Dub Awards	Best Vocal Ensemble - People's Choice	My Hero Academia	Won	
2018	Animedia Character Awards	Coolest	Shoto Todoroki	Won	
2018	2nd Crunchyroll Anime Awards	Anime of the Year	My Hero Academia Season 2	Nominated	
2018	2nd Crunchyroll Anime Awards	Best Action	My Hero Academia Season 2	Won	
2018	2nd Crunchyroll Anime Awards	Best Hero	Izuku "Deku" Midoriya	Won	
2018	2nd Crunchyroll Anime Awards	Best Villain	Stain	Won	
2018	2nd Crunchyroll Anime Awards	Best Boy	Izuku "Deku" Midoriya	Nominated	
2018	2nd Crunchyroll Anime Awards	Best Boy	Shoto Todoroki	Won	
2018	2nd Crunchyroll Anime Awards	Best Girl	Ochaco Uraraka	Won	
2018	2nd Crunchyroll Anime Awards	Best Girl	Tsuyu Asui	Nominated	
2018	2nd Crunchyroll Anime Awards	Best Animation	My Hero Academia Season 2	Won	
2018	2nd Crunchyroll Anime Awards	Best Opening	"Peace Sign" by Kenshi Yonezu	Won	
2018	2nd Crunchyroll Anime Awards	Industry Icon Award	Christopher Sabat as All Might (Note: For his other voice works such as Vegeta and Piccolo of the Dragon Ball franchise)	Won	
2018	Japan Expo Awards	Daruma d'Or Anime	My Hero Academia Season 2	Nominated	
2018	Japan Expo Awards	Daruma for Best Scenario	Kōhei Horikoshi	Nominated	
2018	Japan Expo Awards	Daruma for Best Adapted Series	Kenji Nagasaki	Won	
2018	Japan Expo Awards	Daruma for Best Simulcast	My Hero Academia Season 2	Won	
2018	Japan Expo Awards	Daruma for Best Original Soundtrack	Yuki Hayashi	Nominated	
2018	10th CD Shop Awards	Grand Prize	Bootleg (Note: The album includes "Peace Sign".)	Won	
2018	32nd Japan Gold Disc Awards	Best 5 Songs by Download	"Peace Sign" by Kenshi Yonezu	Won	
2018	40th Anime Grand Prix	Best Theme Song	"Peace Sign" by Kenshi Yonezu	6th place	
2018	6th BTVA Anime Dub Awards	Best Male Lead	Justin Briner as Izuku "Deku" Midoriya	Nominated	
2018	6th BTVA Anime Dub Awards	Best Male Lead - People's Choice	Justin Briner as Izuku "Deku" Midoriya	Won	
2018	6th BTVA Anime Dub Awards	Best Supporting Male	Jarrod Greene as Hitoshi Shinso	Nominated	
2018	8th Newtype Anime Awards	Best Work (TV)	My Hero Academia Season 3	10th place	
2018	8th Newtype Anime Awards	Best Voice Actor	Yuki Kaji	7th place	
2018	8th Newtype Anime Awards	Best Studio	Bones	2nd place	
2018	Billboard Japan Music Awards	Most Downloaded Songs	"Peace Sign" by Kenshi Yonezu	14th place	
2018	Billboard Japan Music Awards	Hot Animation	"Peace Sign" by Kenshi Yonezu	3rd place	
2018	Billboard Japan Music Awards	Hot Animation	"Long Hope Philia" by Masaki Suda	6th place	
2018	Billboard Japan Music Awards	Hot Animation	"Odd Future" by Uverworld	10th place	
2018	IGN Awards	Best Anime Series	My Hero Academia Season 3	Nominated	
2018	IGN Awards	Best Anime Series - People's Choice	My Hero Academia Season 3	Won	
2018	IGN Awards	Best Anime Episode	Episode 49 – "One For All"	Won	
2018	IGN Awards	Best Animation	My Hero Academia Season 3	Nominated	
2018	60th Japan Record Awards	Album of the Year	Bootleg	Won	
2019	3rd Crunchyroll Anime Awards	Best Antagonist	All For One	Won	
2019	3rd Crunchyroll Anime Awards	Best Boy	Izuku "Deku" Midoriya	Won	
2019	3rd Crunchyroll Anime Awards	Best Animation	My Hero Academia Season 3	Nominated	
2019	3rd Crunchyroll Anime Awards	Best VA Performance (English)	Christopher Sabat as All Might	Won	
2019	3rd Crunchyroll Anime Awards	Best Fight Scene	All for One vs. All Might	Won	
2019	13th Seiyu Awards	Best Actor in Supporting Role	Kenta Miyake as All Might	Won	
2019	Billboard Japan Music Awards	Hot Animation	"Peace Sign" by Kenshi Yonezu	12th place	
2019	Magnolia Award	Best Animation	My Hero Academia Season 3	Nominated	
2019	Funimation	Shonen Series of the Decade	My Hero Academia	Won	
2019	Funimation	Best Boys of the Decade	Izuku "Deku" Midoriya	Won	
2019	Funimation	Best Boys of the Decade	Shoto Todoroki	Won	
2019	Funimation	Best Girls of the Decade	Ochaco Uraraka	Won	
2020	2nd Global TV Demand Awards	Most In-Demand Export from Asia	My Hero Academia	Nominated	
2020	4th Crunchyroll Anime Awards	Best Antagonist	Overhaul	Nominated	
2020	42nd Anime Grand Prix	Grand Prix	My Hero Academia Season 4	8th place	
2020	42nd Anime Grand Prix	Best Character (Male)	Izuku Midoriya	6th place	
2020	42nd Anime Grand Prix	Best Voice Actor	Yūki Kaji	4th place	
2020	42nd Anime Grand Prix	Best Voice Actor	Aoi Yūki	6th place	
2020	Billboard Japan Music Awards	Hot Animation	"Peace Sign" by Kenshi Yonezu	17th place	
2021	3rd Global TV Demand Awards	Most In-Demand Anime Series of 2020	My Hero Academia	Won	
2021	5th Crunchyroll Anime Awards	Best Antagonist	Overhaul	Nominated	
2021	5th Crunchyroll Anime Awards	Best VA Performance (English)	Zeno Robinson as Hawks	Won	
2021	5th Crunchyroll Anime Awards	Best Fight Scene	Deku vs. Overhaul	Won	
2021	27th Manga Barcelona Awards	Best Anime Series in Blu-ray/DVD	My Hero Academia Season 4	Won	
2022	4th Global TV Demand Awards	Most In-Demand Anime Series of 2021	My Hero Academia	Nominated	
2022	6th Crunchyroll Anime Awards	Best Antagonist	Tomura Shigaraki	Nominated	
2022	12th Newtype Anime Awards	Best Work (TV)	My Hero Academia Season 5	3rd place	
2022	12th Newtype Anime Awards	Best Director	Kenji Nagasaki and Masahiro Mukai	4th place	
2022	12th Newtype Anime Awards	Best Screenplay	Yōsuke Kuroda	5th place	
2022	12th Newtype Anime Awards	Best Character Design	Yoshihiko Umakoshi and Hitomi Odashima	4th place	
2022	12th Newtype Anime Awards	Best Soundtrack	Yuki Hayashi	5th place	
2022	12th Newtype Anime Awards	Best Studio	Bones	5th place	
2023	5th Global Demand Awards	Most In-Demand Anime Series of 2022	My Hero Academia	Nominated	
2023	7th Crunchyroll Anime Awards	Best VA Performance (Arabic)	Mohja AlSheak as Izuku Midoriya	Nominated	
2023	Japan Expo Awards	Daruma for Best Ending	"Sketch" by Kiro Akiyama	Nominated	
2023	1st Astra Creative Arts TV Awards	Best Streaming Animated Series or TV Movie	My Hero Academia	Nominated	
2024	6th Global Demand Awards	Most In-Demand Anime Series of 2023	My Hero Academia	Nominated	
2024	TikTok Awards Japan	Anime of the Year	My Hero Academia	Won	
2024	Abema Anime Trend Awards	Abema Special Award - Best Final Episode	My Hero Academia Season 7	Won	
2025	7th Global Demand Awards	Most In-Demand TV Series in the World	My Hero Academia	Nominated	
2025	7th Global Demand Awards	Most In-Demand Anime Series of 2024	My Hero Academia	Won	
2025	9th Crunchyroll Anime Awards	Best Continuing Series	My Hero Academia Season 7	Nominated	
2025	Japan Expo Awards	Daruma for Best Original Soundtrack	Yuki Hayashi	Nominated	
2025	Japan Expo Awards	Daruma for Best Ending	"Tsubomi" by Omoinotake	Nominated	
2025	TikTok Awards Japan	Anime of the Year	My Hero Academia	Nominated	
2025	Abema Anime Trend Awards	Abema Special Award	My Hero Academia: Final Season	Won	
2026	8th Global Demand Awards	Most In-Demand TV Series in the World	My Hero Academia	Nominated	
2026	8th Global Demand Awards	Most In-Demand Anime Series of 2025	My Hero Academia	Won	
2026	D-Anime Store Awards	Heart-Touching Anime	My Hero Academia: Final Season	Won	
2026	10th Crunchyroll Anime Awards	Anime of the Year	My Hero Academia: Final Season	Won	
2026	10th Crunchyroll Anime Awards	Best Continuing Series	My Hero Academia: Final Season	Nominated	
2026	10th Crunchyroll Anime Awards	Best Action	My Hero Academia: Final Season	Nominated	
2026	10th Crunchyroll Anime Awards	Best Animation	My Hero Academia: Final Season	Nominated	
2026	10th Crunchyroll Anime Awards	Best Director	Kenji Nagasaki and Naomi Nakayama	Nominated	
2026	10th Crunchyroll Anime Awards	Best Main Character	Izuku "Deku" Midoriya	Nominated	
2026	10th Crunchyroll Anime Awards	Best Supporting Character	Katsuki Bakugo	Won	
2026	10th Crunchyroll Anime Awards	"Must Protect at All Costs" Character	Izuku "Deku" Midoriya	Nominated	
2026	10th Crunchyroll Anime Awards	Best Opening Sequence	"The Revo" by Porno Graffitti	Nominated	
2026	10th Crunchyroll Anime Awards	Best Ending Sequence	"I" by Bump of Chicken	Won	
2026	10th Crunchyroll Anime Awards	Best VA Performance (Japanese)	Daiki Yamashita as Izuku "Deku" Midoriya	Nominated	
2026	10th Crunchyroll Anime Awards	Best VA Performance (English)	Justin Briner as Izuku "Deku" Midoriya	Nominated	
2026	10th Crunchyroll Anime Awards	Best VA Performance (Portuguese)	Fábio Lucindo as Katsuki Bakugo	Nominated	
2026	10th Crunchyroll Anime Awards	Best VA Performance (French)	Bastien Bourlé as Izuku "Deku" Midoriya	Won	
2026	10th Crunchyroll Anime Awards	Best VA Performance (Italian)	Simone Lupinacci as Izuku "Deku" Midoriya	Nominated	
2026	Music Awards Japan	Best J-Rock Song	"I" by Bump of Chicken	Nominated	
2026	Japan Expo Awards	Daruma for Best Anime	My Hero Academia: Final Season	Nominated	
2026	Japan Expo Awards	Daruma for Best Action Anime	My Hero Academia: Final Season	Nominated	
2026	Japan Expo Awards	Daruma for Best Original Soundtrack	My Hero Academia: Final Season	Nominated	
2026	Japan Expo Awards	Daruma for Best Opening	"The Revo" by Porno Graffitti	Nominated	
2026	Japan Expo Awards	Daruma for Best Ending	"I" by Bump of Chicken	Won	
2026	21st AnimaniA Awards	Best TV Sequel Series: Online	My Hero Academia: Final Season	Nominated	
2026	38th Harvey Awards	Best Adaptation from Comic Book/Graphic Novel	My Hero Academia: Final Season	Nominated	
2026	16th Newtype Anime Awards	Best Work (TV/Streaming)	My Hero Academia: Final Season	6th place	
2026	16th Newtype Anime Awards	Best Studio	Bones Film	3rd place	
