= Music of My Hero Academia =

Anime series discography

This article lists the soundtrack albums attributed to the My Hero Academia franchise, featuring music composed and recorded by the Japanese artist Yuki Hayashi along with Shogo Yamashiro and Yuki Furuhashi.

== Soundtrack albums ==
=== My Hero Academia Original Soundtrack ===
My Hero Academia Original Soundtrack

Soundtrack album by Yuki Hayashi
- Released: July 13, 2016
- Genre: Soundtrack
- Length: 66:00
- Label: Toho Animation
- Producer: Yuki Hayashi

My Hero Academia soundtrack albums chronology
My Hero Academia Original Soundtrack (2016)	My Hero Academia 2nd Original Soundtrack (2017)

Singles from My Hero Academia Original Soundtrack
- 1. "Hero A" Released: July 13, 2016

TV Animation My Hero Academia Original Soundtrack (TVアニメ「僕のヒーローアカデミア」オリジナル・サウンドトラック, TV Anime「Boku no Hīrō Akademia」Orijinaru・Saundotorakku) is the soundtrack album to the first season of the anime series. It was composed by Yuki Hayashi and released on July 13, 2016, by Toho Animation Records.

==== Track listing ====
All music is composed by Yuki Hayashi, except where noted.

My Hero Academia Original Soundtrack track listing
No.	Title	Music	Length
1.	"You Say Run"		3:48
2.	"You Can Become a Hero"		2:56
3.	"I Will Become a Hero!"		1:34
4.	"Anguish of the Quirkless"		2:11
5.	"Symbol of Peace"		1:28
6.	""Dependable! Cheerful Person" Wind Adlib"		1:19
7.	"Various Quirks"		1:43
8.	"Villain"		1:34
9.	"Izuku's Crisis"		1:31
10.	"I am Here!"		2:06
11.	"Flustered"		1:37
12.	"Uh-oh?"		1:19
13.	"Hero's Shadow"		1:54
14.	"Mysterious"		1:30
15.	"Rampaging Evil"		1:52
16.	"Hero A"	Yuly (rap and lyrics)	3:15
17.	"Villain Invasion"		1:50
18.	"Plus Ultra"		2:31
19.	"Bright and Cheerful"		1:26
20.	"Rebellious Youth"		1:23
21.	"Stealthy Steps"		1:31
22.	"Battle Training"		1:53
23.	"U.A. High"		1:37
24.	"Lunch Break Song"		1:57
25.	"Massive Villain Appearance"		1:46
26.	"Darkness Dominates The Heart"		1:08
27.	"Mind of Evil"		2:40
28.	"Spreading Anxiety"		1:34
29.	"The Threat of Offence and Defense"		2:10
30.	"Berserk Battle"		1:50
31.	"Analysis"		1:15
32.	"Mecha Mecha Meke Meke"		1:19
33.	"Noisy Battle"		1:22
34.	"Mellow Twilight"		1:46
35.	"My Hero Academia"		3:25
Total length:			66:00

=== My Hero Academia 2nd Original Soundtrack ===
My Hero Academia 2nd Original Soundtrack

Soundtrack album by Yuki Hayashi
- Released: September 6, 2017
- Genre: Soundtrack
- Length: 101:08
- Label: Toho Animation
- Producer: Yuki Hayashi

My Hero Academia soundtrack albums chronology
My Hero Academia Original Soundtrack (2016)	My Hero Academia 2nd Original Soundtrack (2017)	My Hero Academia 2018 Original Soundtrack (2018)

Singles from My Hero Academia 2nd Original Soundtrack
- 1. "Just Another Hero" Released: July 29, 2017; 2. "Here" Released: September 6, 2017

TV Animation My Hero Academia 2nd Original Soundtrack (TVアニメ「僕のヒーローアカデミア」 2nd オリジナル・サウンドトラック, TV Anime「Boku no Hīrō Akademia」 2nd Orijinaru・Saundotorakku) is the soundtrack album to the second season of the anime series. It was composed by Yuki Hayashi and released on September 6, 2017, by Toho Animation Records.

==== Track listing ====
All music is composed by Yuki Hayashi, except where noted.

Disc 1
No.	Title	Length
1.	"Avant Title"	0:37
2.	"Jet Set Run"	3:45
3.	"Damn Cowardly School"	1:35
4.	"Unwind"	1:23
5.	"Each of Their Goals"	1:48
6.	"I Don't Need Pretend Friends"	1:49
7.	"An Abdominal Investigation"	1:24
8.	"Go Seize It!"	2:56
9.	"Obstacle Course"	2:48
10.	"Robo Inferno"	2:24
11.	"Weeee Are Fu×kin Super Star!!"	2:41
12.	"People Always Reaching for the Top"	1:48
13.	"Cavalry Battle"	2:29
14.	"Worthy Rival, Written and Read as "Friend""	2:05
15.	"Forever No. 2"	1:34
16.	"I Absolutely Won't Use the Heat (Left)"	2:00
17.	"It Sounds Scary at Midnight."	2:11
18.	"Heroic Fighting Battle Song"	1:51
19.	"Iron Battle"	2:31
20.	"Bombin King!!"	2:05
21.	"Can't Look in the Eyes of Serenity"	2:11
22.	"Your Power"	2:53
23.	"Closing Ceremony"	1:47
Total length:		48:35

Disc 2
No.	Title	Music	Length
1.	"From Me to You"		2:55
2.	"The Murderer's Eye"		1:38
3.	"Master Criminal"		2:30
4.	"Self-Analysis"		2:21
5.	"Surpassing You"		2:12
6.	"Supportive Heart"		2:30
7.	"Resting Symbol of Peace"		1:56
8.	"Serious Shiver"		1:09
9.	"The Era is Hot"		1:22
10.	"Predecessor's Sworn Friend"		2:33
11.	"Just Another Hero"	Steven McNair (vocals and lyrics)	3:24
12.	"Overflowing Power"		1:58
13.	"Vengeance"		2:22
14.	"Hero Killer"		1:41
15.	"Nevertheless, Go Beyond"		2:43
16.	"All for the Sake of a Correct Society"		1:37
17.	"Trinity"		3:44
18.	"The Power of Endeavor"		2:40
19.	"Ingenium"		1:59
20.	"I'm Seriously Going to Crush You"		2:19
21.	"The Threat Will Go!"		1:56
22.	"Forest Training Camp"		1:59
23.	"Here"	Yuly (rap and lyrics)	3:05
Total length:			52:33

=== My Hero Academia 2018 Original Soundtrack ===
My Hero Academia 2018 Original Soundtrack

Soundtrack album by Yuki Hayashi
- Released: July 18, 2018
- Genre: Soundtrack
- Length: 120:53
- Label: Toho Animation
- Producers: Yuki Hayashi; Yasushi Horiguchi (co-producer)

My Hero Academia soundtrack albums chronology
My Hero Academia 2nd Original Soundtrack (2017)	My Hero Academia 2018 Original Soundtrack (2018)	My Hero Academia: Heroes Rising Original Soundtrack (2019)

My Hero Academia 2018 Original Soundtrack (『僕のヒーローアカデミア』2018オリジナルサウンドトラック, 『Boku no Hīrō Akademia』2018 Orijinaru Saundotorakku) is the soundtrack album to the first animated film My Hero Academia: Two Heroes and the third season of the anime series. It was composed by Yuki Hayashi and released on July 18, 2018, by Toho Animation Records.

==== Track listing ====
All music is composed by Yuki Hayashi.

Disc 1
No.	Title	Length
1.	"New York"	0:34
2.	"The Villain"	1:08
3.	"Y.A.M. -Young All Might-"	2:22
4.	"From Japan"	1:08
5.	"Be a Hero"	2:44
6.	"The Pavilion"	1:17
7.	"One For All"	0:29
8.	"Bright and Cheerful"	1:23
9.	"Each Way"	1:51
10.	"Expo"	1:59
11.	"Looks Like Fun x 2"	0:47
12.	"Mineta & Kaminari"	1:22
13.	"The Villain Attack"	2:14
14.	"1-A"	0:54
15.	"Secret"	1:28
16.	"Mind"	1:30
17.	"Lack Individuality"	2:30
18.	"Dress"	1:27
19.	"A Villain's Mind"	2:39
20.	"Hard Time"	1:04
21.	"My Hero Is Our Hero"	3:49
22.	"A Dead-End"	1:38
23.	"Search"	1:01
24.	"Seesaw Battle"	1:30
25.	"Yeah, Just Do Your Best, Mineta!"	1:02
26.	"Rebar Battle"	1:24
27.	"Lure"	1:10
28.	"Full Gauntlet -30%-"	2:07
29.	"Runaway Battle"	1:12
30.	"Ochaco"	1:25
31.	"Full Gauntlet -Smash-"	1:23
32.	"I'm Coming for You"	1:18
33.	"Isolation"	3:05
34.	"Back-Stab"	1:22
35.	"Battle of Deku"	2:08
36.	"Clutch"	1:59
37.	"I Am Here!"	0:51
38.	"Overwhelming Force"	1:48
39.	"Trinity"	1:18
40.	"The Force of All For One"	1:53
41.	"2 Heros"	3:26
42.	"Friends"	2:05
43.	"From Me to You"	1:21
Total length:		71:05

Disc 2
No.	Title	Length
1.	"Wild, Wild Pussycats"	1:30
2.	"Loneliness"	2:15
3.	"Vanguard Action Squad -Darkness-"	2:38
4.	"Vanguard Action Squad -All-out Attack-"	2:01
5.	"Combat License!"	2:25
6.	"All Might with U.A. Students"	2:29
7.	"All For One"	2:12
8.	"The Power of All For One"	1:58
9.	"One For All vs. All For One"	3:07
10.	"Feeling of Parting"	2:22
11.	"Light of Hope"	2:24
12.	"Heights Alliance"	1:40
13.	"U.A. High School Support Department"	2:19
14.	"Inasa Yoarashi"	2:04
15.	"Shiketsu and U.A."	1:47
16.	"Momo Yaoyorozu"	1:37
17.	"Yuga Aoyama"	2:04
18.	"Deku and All Might's Secret"	1:55
19.	"Katsuki and Izuku"	3:00
20.	"Three Secrets"	1:41
21.	"Tartarus"	1:38
22.	"Overhaul"	1:52
23.	"Mirio"	1:30
24.	"The Theme of All Might on The Shakuhachi"	1:20
Total length:		49:48

=== My Hero Academia: Heroes Rising Original Soundtrack ===
My Hero Academia: Heroes Rising Original Soundtrack

Soundtrack album by Yuki Hayashi
- Released: December 18, 2019
- Genre: Soundtrack
- Length: 72:58
- Label: Toho Animation
- Producer: Yuki Hayashi

My Hero Academia soundtrack albums chronology
My Hero Academia 2018 Original Soundtrack (2018)	My Hero Academia: Heroes Rising Original Soundtrack (2019)	My Hero Academia 4th Original Soundtrack (2020)

Singles from My Hero Academia: Heroes Rising Original Soundtrack
- 1. "Might⁺U" Released: December 20, 2019

My Hero Academia: Heroes Rising Original Soundtrack (「僕のヒーローアカデミア THE MOVIE ヒーローズ:ライジング」オリジナルサウンドトラック, Boku no Hīrō Akademia Za Mūbī Hīrōzu: Raijingu Orijinaru Saundotorakku) is the soundtrack album to the second animated film My Hero Academia: Heroes Rising. It was composed by Yuki Hayashi and released in Japan by Toho Animation Records on December 18, 2019, and in the United States by Milan Records on July 17, 2020. Milan Records released the original soundtrack on vinyl records in the United States in October 2020.

==== Track listing ====
All music is composed by Yuki Hayashi, except where noted.

My Hero Academia: Heroes Rising Original Soundtrack track listing
No.	Title	Music	Length
1.	"Heroes vs. Villains"		2:31
2.	"Nine"		0:52
3.	"A Hero Is..."		0:55
4.	"The Hero Work Recommendation Project"		3:15
5.	"That's Super Hero-Like!!"		1:50
6.	"Nabu Island"		1:25
7.	"Inherited Power"		2:11
8.	"Nine's Quirk"		1:20
9.	"Nine's Blunder"		0:15
10.	"The Villain Appears"		1:00
11.	"You Picked the Wrong Person to Taunt!"		0:48
12.	"Deku and Katsuma"		2:10
13.	"Nine's Action"		1:30
14.	"Surprise Attack of the Villain"		1:48
15.	"Class 1-A, Heading Out!"		2:04
16.	"Nine and His Team's Resistance"		2:21
17.	"Numerical Inferiority"		3:00
18.	"Nine's Tenacity of Purpose"		1:37
19.	"The Strength of the Man Who'll Become the Number One Hero"		2:26
20.	"Islanders' Anxiety"		1:45
21.	"Past with Nine"		2:10
22.	"Together as One"		2:24
23.	"Strategy Meeting"		1:13
24.	"Let's Start the Operation!"		2:25
25.	"We'll Go All-Out to Stop You!"		1:55
26.	"Joint Struggle"		4:12
27.	"Chimera"		2:05
28.	"To the Limit"		2:06
29.	"Nine's Craving"		3:10
30.	"Be Number One –Bakugo's Belief-"		1:20
31.	"Nine's Power"		3:45
32.	"Might⁺U"	Makayla Phillips (vocals); cAnON. and Yuki Hayashi (lyrics)	6:29
33.	"A Heart That Is Inherited"		2:36
34.	"There Is a Hero There"		2:05
Total length:			72:58

=== My Hero Academia 4th Original Soundtrack ===
My Hero Academia 4th Original Soundtrack

Soundtrack album by Yuki Hayashi
- Released: March 25, 2020
- Genre: Soundtrack
- Length: 49:18
- Label: Toho Animation
- Producers: Yuki Hayashi; Yasushi Horiguchi (co-producer)

My Hero Academia soundtrack albums chronology
My Hero Academia: Heroes Rising Original Soundtrack (2019)	My Hero Academia 4th Original Soundtrack (2020)	My Hero Academia: World Heroes' Mission Original Soundtrack (2021)

Singles from My Hero Academia 4th Original Soundtrack
- 1. "Might" Released: January 11, 2020; 2. "Each Goal" Released: February 22, 2020; 3. "Hero too" Released: March 21, 2020

TV Animation My Hero Academia 4th Original Soundtrack (TVアニメ『僕のヒーローアカデミア』4th オリジナルサウンドトラック, TV Anime『Boku no Hīrō Akademia』4th Orijinaru Saundotorakku) is the soundtrack album to the fourth season of the anime series. It was composed by Yuki Hayashi and released on March 25, 2020, by Toho Animation Records.

==== Track listing ====
All music is composed by Yuki Hayashi, except where noted.

My Hero Academia 4th Original Soundtrack Selection track listing
No.	Title	Music	Length
1.	"Shie Hassaikai"		2:01
2.	"Eri"		2:21
3.	"Brawl"		2:51
4.	"Mimicry"		0:59
5.	"Something to Protect"		3:24
6.	"I'll Be Back..."		2:00
7.	"The Spear and Shield Match"		2:43
8.	"Not Even a Man"		2:04
9.	"Red Riot"		2:27
10.	"Flashback"		1:26
11.	"Special Quirk"		1:58
12.	"I'll Be Your Hero"		2:59
13.	"Might"	Makayla Phillips (vocals); cAnON. and Yuki Hayashi (lyrics)	5:43
14.	"The Gentleman Thief"		1:25
15.	"Each Goal"	Chrissy Costanza (vocals); cAnON. and Hayashi (lyrics)	0:40
16.	"Hero too"	Costanza (vocals); Ayapeta and Hayashi (lyrics)	4:18
17.	"Hero too-1"		4:18
18.	"Might-1"		5:41
Total length:			49:18

=== My Hero Academia: World Heroes' Mission Original Soundtrack ===
My Hero Academia: World Heroes' Mission Original Soundtrack

Soundtrack album by Yuki Hayashi
- Released: August 6, 2021
- Genre: Soundtrack
- Length: 71:38
- Label: Toho Animation
- Producer: Yuki Hayashi

My Hero Academia soundtrack albums chronology
My Hero Academia 4th Original Soundtrack (2020)	My Hero Academia: World Heroes' Mission Original Soundtrack (2021)	My Hero Academia 5th Original Soundtrack (2021)

My Hero Academia: World Heroes' Mission Original Soundtrack (『僕のヒーローアカデミア THE MOVIE ワールド ヒーローズ ミッション』 オリジナルサウンドトラック, Boku no Hīrō Akademia Za Mūbī Wārudo Hīrōzu Misshon Orijinaru Saundotorakku) is the soundtrack album to the third animated film My Hero Academia: World Heroes' Mission. It was composed by Yuki Hayashi and released in Japan by Toho Animation Records and in the United States by Milan Records on August 6, 2021.

Milan Records released the soundtrack on vinyl records in the United States in July 2022. That month, Anime Limited announced the release of the soundtrack on vinyl records in the United Kingdom and Ireland. Selected tracks from the soundtrack were remastered and included in the album My Hero Academia (Soundtrack Selection 2021–2023), which was released digitally in March 2023.

==== Track listing ====
All music is composed by Yuki Hayashi.

My Hero Academia: World Heroes' Mission Original Soundtrack track listing
No.	Title	Length
1.	"Humarise"	1:47
2.	"Terrorism"	1:54
3.	"Nerves Before Dispatch – The Story So Far"	4:18
4.	"Opening"	1:34
5.	"From the Slums to the Cities"	0:43
6.	"Incident Occurs"	2:59
7.	"Mysterious Villains"	1:27
8.	"Tactics"	1:01
9.	"Impatience"	0:51
10.	"Reasons to be Chased"	2:14
11.	"Wanted Criminal"	1:40
12.	"A Tough Decision"	1:09
13.	"Deku's Whereabouts"	0:51
14.	"Rody's Past"	2:17
15.	"Pursuer"	1:41
16.	"Inferiority Complex"	2:39
17.	"Rody's Heart"	2:10
18.	"Surprise Attack"	1:51
19.	"Rescue"	1:07
20.	"Relief for Humanity"	2:02
21.	"Opposition"	2:10
22.	"Message"	1:24
23.	"Flect's Trap"	5:43
24.	"Fight Against the Strong"	4:03
25.	"Flect's Thoughts"	1:23
26.	"Flect's Power"	3:01
27.	"Surrender"	3:01
28.	"Resolved Action"	3:07
29.	"Todoroki's Counterattack"	2:31
30.	"The Spirit to Succeed"	4:51
31.	"Go Straight!"	1:53
32.	"Sacrifice and Peace – Friendship"	2:16
Total length:		71:38

=== My Hero Academia 5th Original Soundtrack ===
My Hero Academia 5th Original Soundtrack

Soundtrack album by Yuki Hayashi
- Released: September 26, 2021
- Genre: Soundtrack
- Length: 52:54
- Label: Toho Animation
- Producer: Yuki Hayashi

My Hero Academia soundtrack albums chronology
My Hero Academia: World Heroes' Mission Original Soundtrack (2021)	My Hero Academia 5th Original Soundtrack (2021)	My Hero Academia 6th Original Soundtrack (2022)

Singles from My Hero Academia 5th Original Soundtrack
- 1. "Sound of the Holidays" Released: March 31, 2021

TV Animation My Hero Academia 5th Original Soundtrack (TVアニメ『僕のヒーローアカデミア』5th オリジナルサウンドトラック, TV Anime『Boku no Hīrō Academia』5th Orijinaru Saundotorakku) is the soundtrack album to the fifth season of the anime series. It was composed by Yuki Hayashi and released on September 26, 2021, by Toho Animation Records. Milan Records released the soundtrack on CD and vinyl records in the United States on January 26, 2022. Anime Limited also released the soundtrack digitally which contains a two-LP set in the United Kingdom and Ireland on June 17, 2022.

==== Track listing ====
All music is composed by Yuki Hayashi, except where noted.

My Hero Academia 5th Original Soundtrack track listing
No.	Title	Music	Length
1.	"Go, Plus Ultra"		1:59
2.	"So Classmate Were Born Of Worthy Competition"		3:00
3.	"Successor"		3:16
4.	"A vs B"		2:36
5.	""Quirk" Don-Pachi Great Exchange"		5:59
6.	"What To Inherit"		2:59
7.	"The Mission Of The Stealth Hawk"		1:43
8.	"Different Ability Liberation Army"		2:30
9.	"My Villain Academia"		2:39
10.	"Second Coming"		6:36
11.	"Gigantomachia"		2:00
12.	"Mine Woman"		2:04
13.	"Toga's Nature"		2:12
14.	"Symbol of Fear"		2:48
15.	"I Don't Kill My Friends"		2:03
16.	"Re Destro"		2:30
17.	"Paranormal Liberation Front"		2:14
18.	"Sound of the Holidays"	Jonathan Underdown (vocals and lyrics)	1:53
19.	"Sound of the Holidays" (Instrumental Version)		1:53
Total length:			52:54

=== My Hero Academia 6th Original Soundtrack ===
My Hero Academia 6th Original Soundtrack

Soundtrack album by Yuki Hayashi
- Released: December 14, 2022
- Genre: Soundtrack
- Length: 13:18
- Label: Toho Animation
- Producer: Yuki Hayashi

My Hero Academia soundtrack albums chronology
My Hero Academia 5th Original Soundtrack (2021)	My Hero Academia 6th Original Soundtrack (2022)	My Hero Academia 7th Original Soundtrack Pre-Release (2024)

TV Animation My Hero Academia 6th Original Soundtrack (TVアニメ『僕のヒーローアカデミア』6th オリジナルサウンドトラック, TV Anime『Boku no Hīrō Akademia』6th Orijinaru Saundotorakku) is the soundtrack album to the sixth season of the anime series. It was composed by Yuki Hayashi and released on December 14, 2022, by Toho Animation Records.

==== Track listing ====
All music is composed by Yuki Hayashi.

My Hero Academia 6th Original Soundtrack track listing
No.	Title	Length
1.	"Weeee Are Fu×kin Super Hero!!"	2:32
2.	"Revengers"	2:27
3.	"We'll be everyone's heroes"	1:54
4.	"All for my sake"	3:37
5.	"Dabi Dance"	2:48
Total length:		13:18

=== My Hero Academia 7th Original Soundtrack Pre-Release ===
My Hero Academia 7th Original Soundtrack Pre-Release

Soundtrack album by Yuki Hayashi
- Released: July 7, 2024
- Genre: Soundtrack
- Length: 50:25
- Label: Toho Animation
- Producer: Yuki Hayashi

My Hero Academia soundtrack albums chronology
My Hero Academia 6th Original Soundtrack (2022)	My Hero Academia 7th Original Soundtrack Pre-Release (2024)	My Hero Academia: You're Next Original Soundtrack (2024)

TV Animation My Hero Academia 7th Original Soundtrack Pre-Release (TVアニメ『僕のヒーローアカデミア』7th オリジナルサウンドトラック ～Pre-release～, TV Anime『Boku no Hīrō Akademia』7th Orijinaru Saundotorakku ～Pure-rirīsu～) is the soundtrack album to the first half in the seventh season of the anime series. It was composed by Yuki Hayashi and released on July 7, 2024, by Toho Animation Records.

==== Track listing ====
All music is composed by Yuki Hayashi.

My Hero Academia 7th Original Soundtrack Pre-Release track listing
No.	Title	Length
1.	"Star and Stripe"	4:08
2.	"The cinders of liberation"	2:28
3.	"Cassie"	2:49
4.	"Friend"	2:09
5.	"You can still be"	3:17
6.	"Division"	5:32
7.	"Let me suck some blood?"	2:18
8.	"We'll put a stop to them for sure"	3:21
9.	"Moonlight"	4:02
10.	"Inflation"	3:12
11.	"You two are weird"	3:22
12.	"The Demon Lord"	3:10
13.	"You Say Run -Succession-"	10:37
Total length:		50:25

=== My Hero Academia: You're Next Original Soundtrack ===
My Hero Academia: You're Next Original Soundtrack

Soundtrack album by Yuki Hayashi
- Released: August 7, 2024
- Genre: Soundtrack
- Length: 83:24
- Label: Toho Animation
- Producer: Yuki Hayashi

My Hero Academia soundtrack albums chronology
My Hero Academia 7th Original Soundtrack Pre-Release (2024)	My Hero Academia: You're Next Original Soundtrack (2024)	My Hero Academia 7th Original Soundtrack (2024)

My Hero Academia: You're Next Original Soundtrack (『僕のヒーローアカデミア THE MOVIE ユアネクスト』オリジナルサウンドトラック, Boku no Hīrō Akademia Za Mūbī Yuā Nekusuto Orijinaru Saundotorakku) is the soundtrack album to the fourth animated film My Hero Academia: You're Next. It was composed by Yuki Hayashi and released in Japan by Toho Animation Records on August 7, 2024.

==== Track listing ====
All music is composed by Yuki Hayashi.

My Hero Academia: You're Next Original Soundtrack track listing
No.	Title	Length
1.	"Gollini -Admire-"	2:07
2.	"Incident Happens"	1:00
3.	"Class A's Mission"	1:49
4.	"Jailbreaker"	3:16
5.	"Uninvited Guest"	1:49
6.	"Gollini -Action-"	2:20
7.	"Run Away"	2:00
8.	"Breakout Star All Might"	2:47
9.	"Massive Fort"	3:26
10.	"Two All Mights"	1:51
11.	"Start Dark Might Legend"	3:21
12.	"Crisis Action"	0:56
13.	"Giulio"	1:01
14.	"Deborah's Quirk"	1:58
15.	"Showtime"	0:55
16.	"Use of force"	2:32
17.	"My dear, Paulo"	1:22
18.	"Scar on Face"	0:29
19.	"Just a secret trick"	1:06
20.	"Bizarre sight"	1:37
21.	"Fantasy"	1:32
22.	"Lost arm"	0:38
23.	"Destiny"	4:08
24.	"Common front"	1:16
25.	"The Battle Beginning"	6:12
26.	"Combat"	0:46
27.	"Eighth Grade"	2:18
28.	"Don't give up!"	3:21
29.	"Alchemy"	2:49
30.	"Todoroki & Bakugo"	2:25
31.	"Desperate Situation"	2:39
32.	"Final Battle"	3:57
33.	"Next, it's our turn!"	3:52
34.	"Rampage"	4:39
35.	"The Trinity"	2:18
36.	"The Downfall of a Legend"	0:41
37.	"Giulio & Anna"	2:11
Total length:		83:24

=== My Hero Academia 7th Original Soundtrack ===
My Hero Academia 7th Original Soundtrack

Soundtrack album by Yuki Hayashi
- Released: October 16, 2024
- Genre: Soundtrack
- Length: 102:11
- Label: Toho Animation
- Producer: Yuki Hayashi

My Hero Academia soundtrack albums chronology
My Hero Academia: You're Next Original Soundtrack (2024)	My Hero Academia 7th Original Soundtrack (2024)	My Hero Academia: Vigilantes Original Series Soundtrack - Selected Version (2025)

TV Animation My Hero Academia 7th Original Soundtrack (TVアニメ『僕のヒーローアカデミア』7th オリジナルサウンドトラック, TV Anime『Boku no Hīrō Akademia』7th Orijinaru Saundotorakku) is the soundtrack album to the seventh season of the anime series. It was composed by Yuki Hayashi and released on October 16, 2024, by Toho Animation Records.

==== Track listing ====
All music is composed by Yuki Hayashi.

Disc 1
No.	Title	Length
1.	"Star and Stripe"	4:08
2.	"The cinders of liberation"	2:28
3.	"Cassie"	2:49
4.	"Friend"	2:09
5.	"You can still be"	3:16
6.	"Let you down"	3:04
7.	"There's no such thing as a bit player"	2:57
8.	"Division"	5:33
9.	"Let me suck some blood?"	2:18
10.	"We'll put a stop to them for sure"	3:21
11.	"Moonlight"	4:02
12.	"Super Hyper Unfair Broken Stage"	4:35
13.	"Inflation"	3:12
14.	"You two are weird"	3:22
15.	"The Demon Lord"	3:10
16.	"Light Fades To Rain"	2:40
17.	"You can still be -EP Ver.-"	3:14
18.	"You two are weird -EP Ver.-"	3:42
Total length:		60:00

Disc 2
No.	Title	Length
1.	"Quintuble"	2:46
2.	"Together With Shoji"	2:57
3.	"Infinite Doubles Sad Man's Parade"	2:36
4.	"Gently Super-Lover!!"	2:20
5.	"Standing His Ground, Like an Antihero"	3:09
6.	"Phosphor"	3:14
7.	"Thawing"	3:04
8.	"Ochaco Uraraka Vs Himiko Toga"	4:15
9.	"Armored All Might"	3:02
10.	"六等星 -MHA Arr Ver.-"	2:59
11.	"You Say Run -Succession-"	10:38
12.	"The Story of How We All Became Heroes"	1:11
Total length:		42:11

=== My Hero Academia: Vigilantes Original Series Soundtrack - Selected Version ===
My Hero Academia Vigilantes Original Series Soundtrack - Selected Version

Soundtrack album by Yuki Hayashi, Shogo Yamashiro, and Yuki Furuhashi
- Released: July 1, 2025
- Genre: Soundtrack
- Length: 25:54
- Label: Toho Animation
- Producer: Yuki Hayashi

My Hero Academia soundtrack albums chronology
My Hero Academia 7th Original Soundtrack (2024)	My Hero Academia Vigilantes Original Series Soundtrack - Selected Version (2025)	My Hero Academia Final Season Original Series Soundtrack Pre-Release (2025)

My Hero Academia: Vigilantes Original Series Soundtrack - Selected Version (『ヴィジランテ -僕のヒーローアカデミア ILLEGALS-』オリジナルサウンドトラック〜Selected Version〜, 『Vijirante: Boku no Hīrō Akademia Irīgarusu』Orijinaru Saundotorakku 〜Serekteddo Bāshon〜) is the soundtrack album to the first season of the My Hero Academia: Vigilantes anime series. It was composed by Yuki Hayashi, Shogo Yamashiro, and Yuki Furuhashi and released on July 1, 2025, by Toho Animation Records.

==== Track listing ====
All music is composed by Yuki Hayashi, Shogo Yamashiro, and Yuki Furahashi, except where noted.

My Hero Academia: Vigilantes Original Series Soundtrack - Selected Version track listing
No.	Title	Music	Length
1.	"Vigilante Squad"	Yuki Hayashi (lyrics); Mic Bruzza (vocals)	5:09
2.	"Brand New Day"	Shogo Yamashiro (lyrics); Yamashiro, Ashwin Shenoy (vocals)	2:23
3.	"side street"	Hayashi	1:46
4.	"Do you take action, or don'tcha?!"	Yuki Furuhashi	2:39
5.	"Stage Face"	Furuhashi	1:39
6.	"I'm Here"	Yamashiro (lyrics); Yamashiro, Paranom (vocals)	2:52
7.	"As Usual"	Furuhashi	1:46
8.	"Captain Celebrity"	Furuhashi (lyrics); Furuhashi, Nicholas Aquilino(Chez), Paranom, Kasper (vocals)	2:21
9.	"Vigilante Heroes"		3:22
10.	"Nice Guy"	Hayashi	1:57
Total length:			25:54

=== My Hero Academia Final Season Original Series Soundtrack Pre-Release ===
My Hero Academia Final Season Original Series Soundtrack Pre-Release

Soundtrack album by Yuki Hayashi
- Released: October 19, 2025
- Genre: Soundtrack
- Length: 13:10
- Label: Toho Animation
- Producer: Yuki Hayashi

My Hero Academia soundtrack albums chronology
My Hero Academia: Vigilantes Original Series Soundtrack - Selected Version (2025)	My Hero Academia Final Season Original Series Soundtrack Pre-Release (2025)	My Hero Academia Final Season Original Series Soundtrack (2025)

TV Animation My Hero Academia Final Season Original Series Soundtrack Pre-Release (TVアニメ『僕のヒーローアカデミア』FINAL SEASON オリジナルサウンドトラック～Pre-release～, TV Anime『Boku no Hīrō Akademia』Final Season Orijinaru Saundotorakku ～Pure-rirīsu～) is the soundtrack album to the first half in the eighth and final season of the anime series. It was composed by Yuki Hayashi and released on October 19, 2025, by Toho Animation Records.

==== Track listing ====
All music is composed by Yuki Hayashi.

My Hero Academia Final Season Original Series Soundtrack Pre-Release track listing
No.	Title	Length
1.	"AFO Vs AAM"	3:14
2.	"At the Limit"	4:34
3.	"The End of An Era, And ―"	1:54
4.	"Butterfly Effect"	3:28
Total length:		13:10

=== My Hero Academia Final Season Original Series Soundtrack ===
My Hero Academia Final Season Original Series Soundtrack

Soundtrack album by Yuki Hayashi
- Released: December 14, 2025
- Genre: Soundtrack
- Length: 61:46
- Label: Toho Animation
- Producer: Yuki Hayashi

My Hero Academia soundtrack albums chronology
My Hero Academia Final Season Original Series Soundtrack Pre-Release (2025)	My Hero Academia Final Season Original Series Soundtrack (2025)	My Hero Academia: Vigilantes Original Series Soundtrack (2026)

TV Animation My Hero Academia Final Season Original Series Soundtrack (TVアニメ『僕のヒーローアカデミア』FINAL SEASON オリジナルサウンドトラック, TV Anime『Boku no Hīrō Akademia』Final Season Orijinaru Saundotorakku) is the soundtrack album to the eighth and final season of the anime series. It was composed by Yuki Hayashi and released on December 14, 2025, by Toho Animation Records.

==== Track listing ====
All music is composed by Yuki Hayashi.

My Hero Academia Final Season Original Series Soundtrack track listing
No.	Title	Length
1.	"AFO Vs AAM"	3:14
2.	"At the Limit"	4:34
3.	"The End of An Era, And ―"	1:54
4.	"Butterfly Effect"	3:28
5.	"Nighty-Night Time"	2:15
6.	"Part Ways With One For All"	3:09
7.	"Overlay"	2:13
8.	"Does Being Worried Mean I Don't Trust Him?"	4:05
9.	"I'm Sorry, Kotaro"	3:20
10.	"Foolish Vessel"	3:42
11.	"Achieved Nothing"	2:26
12.	"We Are Here!"	3:42
13.	"The Gust That Blew That Day"	2:48
14.	"An Exceptional Child"	2:58
15.	"I Took Him Up On His Offer To Dance"	4:40
16.	"You've Destroyed Enough"	3:07
17.	"You Can Do It!"	7:38
18.	"Great Hero"	2:33
Total length:		61:46

=== My Hero Academia: Vigilantes Original Series Soundtrack ===
My Hero Academia: Vigilantes Original Series Soundtrack

Soundtrack album by Yuki Hayashi, Shogo Yamashiro, and Yuki Furuhashi
- Released: April 15, 2026
- Genre: Soundtrack
- Length: 110:35
- Label: Toho Animation
- Producer: Yuki Hayashi

My Hero Academia soundtrack albums chronology
My Hero Academia Final Season Original Series Soundtrack (2025)	My Hero Academia: Vigilantes Original Series Soundtrack (2026)

My Hero Academia: Vigilantes Original Soundtrack (『ヴィジランテ -僕のヒーローアカデミア ILLEGALS-』オリジナルサウンドトラック, 『Vijirante: Boku no Hīrō Akademia Irīgarusu』Orijinaru Saundotorakku) is the soundtrack album to the first and second season of the My Hero Academia: Vigilantes anime series. It was composed by Yuki Hayashi, Shogo Yamashiro, and Yuki Furuhashi and released on April 15, 2026, by Toho Animation Records.

==== Track listing ====
All music is composed by Yuki Hayashi, Shogo Yamashiro, and Yuki Furuhashi, except where noted.

Disc 1
No.	Title	Music	Length
1.	"Vigilante Squad"	Yuki Hayashi (lyrics); Mic Bruzza (vocals)	5:09
2.	"Vigilante Heroes"		3:22
3.	"Brand New Day"	Shogo Yamashiro (lyrics); Yamashiro, Ashwin Shenoy (vocals)	2:23
4.	"side street"	Hayashi	1:46
5.	"GAAAAAH adlib. II"	Hayashi	0:55
6.	"Nice Guy"	Hayashi	1:57
7.	"See You Again"	Yuki Furuhashi	1:43
8.	"To me, all this time..."	Furuhashi	2:17
9.	"Knuckleduster"	Yamashiro	4:17
10.	"Do you take action, or don'tcha?!"	Furuhashi	2:39
11.	"I'm Here"	Yamashiro (lyrics); Yamashiro, Paranom (vocals)	2:52
12.	"Kinda Boring"	Yamashiro	2:08
13.	"Stage Face"	Furuhashi	1:39
14.	"You're coming home, Tamao"	Furuhashi	3:02
15.	"I'll Get Through to You"	Yamashiro	3:23
16.	"hard and gentle"	Yamashiro	2:38
17.	"Captain Celebrity"	Furuhashi (lyrics); Furuhashi, Nicholas Aquilino(Chez), Paranom, Kasper (vocals)	2:21
18.	"I Do What I Can"	Hayashi	3:10
19.	"Top Runner"	Hayashi	3:03
20.	"scars of hate"	Yamashiro	2:33
21.	"Vs. Overclock"	Furuhashi	3:29
22.	"Garbage Like You..."	Yamashiro	2:40
Total length:			59:26

Disc 2
No.	Title	Music	Length
1.	"Stendhal"	Hayashi	2:13
2.	"Judgment"	Hayashi	2:30
3.	"Materials of Evil"	Furuhashi	2:11
4.	"Out of Control Power"	Furuhashi	2:49
5.	"Go Unagi"	Yamashiro	2:29
6.	"Multiplying Explosions"	Furuhashi	2:51
7.	"There are some jobs meant for us"	Furuhashi	2:46
8.	"Kindly... dude"	Hayashi	2:35
9.	"him"	Yamashiro	2:15
10.	"It has to be something"	Furuhashi	1:52
11.	"underground pop"	Yamashiro	2:20
12.	"As Usual"	Furuhashi	1:46
13.	"sleepless night"	Yamashiro	2:14
14.	"Pop☆Step"	Hayashi, Yuno Sonoda (lyrics); Ikumi Hasegawa (CV: Pop☆Step) (vocals)	1:42
15.	"Looking for you"	Hayashi, Sonoda (lyrics); Hasegawa (CV: Pop☆Step) (vocals)	1:50
16.	"Coast to Coast"	Hayashi (lyrics); Nicholas Aquilino(Chez), Shayne Holland (vocals)	1:37
17.	"C.H.E.E.R."	Hayashi (lyrics); CC Cheerleaders (vocals)	1:19
18.	"Chris takes the world by storm"	Hayashi (lyrics); 鳴羽田漢気応援団 (vocals)	1:25
19.	"The Marukane Department Store Jingle"	Hayashi, Hideyuki Furuhashi (lyrics) Marukane Kids (vocals)	0:47
20.	"Maru☆Kane - Vo. Ver."	Hayashi	1:48
21.	"Maru☆Kane"	Hayashi	1:48
22.	"Yearning for Naruhata"	Hayashi, Hideyuki Furuhashi (lyrics); Harusaburo Nanboku (vocals)	0:35
23.	"My☆Hero"	Hayashi, Sonoda (lyrics); Hasegawa (CV: Pop☆Step) (vocals)	3:02
24.	"A Remix of The Marukane Department Store Jingle"	Hayashi, Hideyuki Furuhashi (lyrics); FeatherHATS (vocals)	1:46
25.	"Can't Help Loving You"	Hayashi (lyrics); The Little Sisters (vocals)	1:35
26.	"Kani Umainen"	Hayashi, Dai Haraguchi (lyrics); Keisuke Nakashima (vocals)	1:04
Total length:			51:09

== Compilation albums ==
=== My Hero Academia Soundtrack Selection 2016–2018 ===
My Hero Academia Soundtrack Selection 2016–2018

Soundtrack album by Yuki Hayashi
- Released: August 21, 2019
- Genre: Soundtrack
- Length: 75:49
- Label: Toho Animation
- Producer: Yuki Hayashi

My Hero Academia soundtrack albums chronology
My Hero Academia Soundtrack Selection 2016–2018 (2019)	My Hero Academia Soundtrack Selection 2019–2021 (2022)

TV Animation My Hero Academia Soundtrack Selection 2016–2018 (TVアニメ「僕のヒーローアカデミア」サウンドトラックセレクション 2016~2018, TV Anime「Boku no Hīrō Akademia」Saundotorakku Serekushon 2016~2018) is the compilation album featuring the soundtracks from the first season to the third season of the anime series. It was composed by Yuki Hayashi and released on August 21, 2019, by Toho Animation Records.

==== Track listing ====
All music is composed by Yuki Hayashi, except where noted.

My Hero Academia Soundtrack Selection 2016–2018 track listing
No.	Title	Music	Length
1.	"You Say Run"		3:48
2.	"I am Here!"		2:06
3.	"Rampaging Evil"		1:51
4.	"Hero A"	Yuly (rap and lyrics)	3:14
5.	"Plus Ultra"		2:31
6.	"Battle Training"		1:53
7.	"U.A. High"		1:38
8.	"The Threat of Offence and Defense"		2:10
9.	"Avant Title"		0:37
10.	"Jet Set Run"		3:45
11.	"Damn Cowardly School"		1:35
12.	"Each of Their Goals"		1:48
13.	"Weeee Are Fu×kin Super Star!!"		2:41
14.	"Worthy Rival, Written and Read as "Friend""		2:05
15.	"Forever No. 2"		1:34
16.	"Bombing King!!"		2:05
17.	"From Me to You"		2:55
18.	"Self-Analysis"		2:21
19.	"Just Another Hero"	Steven McNair (vocals and lyrics)	3:25
20.	"Trinity"		3:43
21.	"Here"	Yuly (rap and lyrics)	3:05
22.	"Combat License!"		2:25
23.	"All Might with U.A. Students"		2:29
24.	"The Power of All For One"		1:57
25.	"One For All vs. All For One"		3:07
26.	"Shiketsu and U.A."		1:47
27.	"Momo Yaoyorozu"		1:37
28.	"Yuga Aoyama"		2:04
29.	"Mirio"		1:28
30.	"Katsuki and Izuku"		3:00
31.	"Three Secrets"		1:40
32.	"My Hero Academia"		3:25
Total length:			75:49

=== My Hero Academia Soundtrack Selection 2019–2021 ===
My Hero Academia Soundtrack Selection 2019–2021

Soundtrack album by Yuki Hayashi
- Released: January 26, 2022
- Genre: Soundtrack
- Length: 76:53
- Label: Toho Animation
- Producer: Yuki Hayashi

My Hero Academia soundtrack albums chronology
My Hero Academia Soundtrack Selection 2016–2018 (2019)	My Hero Academia Soundtrack Selection 2019–2021 (2022)	My Hero Academia Soundtrack Selection 2021–2023 (2023)

My Hero Academia Soundtrack Selection 2019–2021 (「僕のヒーローアカデミア」サウンドトラックセレクション 2019–2021, 「Boku no Hīrō Akademia」Saundotorakku Serekushon 2019–2021) is the compilation album featuring the soundtracks from the fourth season and the fifth season of the anime series alongside the second and third animated films Heroes Rising and World Heroes' Mission, respectively. It was composed by Yuki Hayashi and released on January 26, 2022, by Toho Animation Records.

==== Track listing ====
All music is composed by Yuki Hayashi, except where noted.

My Hero Academia Soundtrack Selection 2019–2021 track listing
No.	Title	Music	Length
1.	"Hero too"	Chrissy Costanza (vocals); Ayapeta and Yuki Hayashi (lyrics)	4:15
2.	"The Spear and Shield Match"		2:42
3.	"I'll Be Your Hero"		2:59
4.	"You Picked the Wrong Person to Taunt!"		0:48
5.	"Nine's Tenacity of Purpose"		1:37
6.	"Might⁺U"	Makayla Phillips (vocals); cAnON. and Hayashi (lyrics)	6:29
7.	"So Classmate Were Born Of Worthy Competition"		3:00
8.	"Go, Plus Ultra"		1:58
9.	"A vs B"		2:35
10.	""Quirk" Don-Pachi Great Exchange"		5:59
11.	"Sound of the Holidays"	Jonathan Underdown (vocals and lyrics)	1:53
12.	"My Villain Academia"		2:39
13.	"Second Coming"		6:36
14.	"Gigantomachia"		1:59
15.	"Symbol Of Fear"		2:48
16.	"Paranormal Liberation Front"		2:14
17.	"Opening"		1:35
18.	"From the Slums to the Cities"		0:42
19.	"Incident Occurs"		2:59
20.	"Reasons to be Chased"		2:14
21.	"Rody's Past"		2:17
22.	"Rescue"		1:07
23.	"Flect's Power"		3:00
24.	"Todoroki's Counterattack"		2:31
25.	"Go Straight!"		1:53
26.	"Heroes' Mission"		1:39
27.	"Go Beyond!!"		6:25
Total length:			76:53

=== My Hero Academia Soundtrack Selection 2021–2023 ===
My Hero Academia Soundtrack Selection 2021–2023

Soundtrack album by Yuki Hayashi
- Released: March 15, 2023
- Genre: Soundtrack
- Length: 129:24
- Label: Toho Animation
- Producer: Yuki Hayashi

My Hero Academia soundtrack albums chronology
My Hero Academia Soundtrack Selection 2019–2021 (2022)	My Hero Academia Soundtrack Selection 2021–2023 (2023)

My Hero Academia Soundtrack Selection 2021–2023 (「僕のヒーローアカデミア」サウンドトラックセレクション 2021–2023, 「Boku no Hīrō Akademia」Saundotorakku Serekushon 2021–2023) is the compilation album featuring the soundtracks from the fifth season and the sixth season of the anime series alongside the third animated film My Hero Academia: World Heroes' Mission. It was composed by Yuki Hayashi and released on March 15, 2023, by Toho Animation Records.

==== Track listing ====
All music is composed by Yuki Hayashi, except where noted.

Disc 1
No.	Title	Length
1.	"Weeee Are Fu×kin Super Hero!!"	2:32
2.	"Revengers"	2:27
3.	"We'll be everyone's heroes"	1:54
4.	"All for my sake"	3:37
5.	"The Next Me"	2:42
6.	"Dabi Dance"	2:48
7.	"Can't face the grief"	2:34
8.	"I am not here"	2:30
9.	"I have to be the one"	2:11
10.	"Look at me"	2:44
11.	"Let's dance with me, here in hell"	3:45
12.	"About Your Resolve"	4:19
13.	"Assassins from Demon Lord"	1:44
14.	"The Lovely Assassin"	2:32
15.	"A power meant for saving"	3:05
16.	"I want to save that little boy"	3:21
17.	"The Last Wielder"	3:17
18.	"I'm sorry for everything I've done"	2:34
19.	"Revengers -Plus Ultra ver.-"	2:26
20.	"We'll be everyone's heroes -Plus Ultra ver.-"	1:54
Total length:		54:56

Disc 2
No.	Title	Music	Length
1.	"Successor -Remastering 2023-"		3:15
2.	"Different Ability Liberation Army -Remastering 2023-"		2:28
3.	"Re Destro -Remastering 2023-"		2:30
4.	"Mine Woman -Remastering 2023-"		2:04
5.	"Toga's nature -Remastering 2023-"		2:11
6.	"I Don't Kill My Friends -Remastering 2023-"		2:02
7.	"What to Inherit -Remastering 2023-"		2:58
8.	"The Mission of the Stealth Hawk -Remastering 2023-"		1:42
9.	"Sound of the Holidays inst Ver -Remastering 2023-"		1:53
10.	"Humarise -Remastering 2023-"	Lance A. Fairchok (lyrics)	1:47
11.	"Terrorism -Remastering 2023-"	Fairchok (lyrics)	1:55
12.	"Nerves before dispatch - The story so far -Remastering 2023-"		4:18
13.	"Mysterious villains -Remastering 2023-"		1:27
14.	"Tactics -Remastering 2023-"		1:01
15.	"Impatience -Remastering 2023-"		0:52
16.	"Wanted criminal -Remastering 2023-"		1:41
17.	"A tough decision -Remastering 2023-"		1:09
18.	"Deku's whereabouts -Remastering 2023-"		0:51
19.	"Pursuer -Remastering 2023-"		1:41
20.	"Inferiority complex -Remastering 2023-"		2:39
21.	"Rody's heart -Remastering 2023-"		2:10
22.	"Surprise attack -Remastering 2023-"		1:52
23.	"Relief for humanity -Remastering 2023-"		2:02
24.	"Opposition -Remastering 2023-"		2:10
25.	"Message -Remastering 2023-"		1:25
26.	"Flect's trap -Remastering 2023-"		5:43
27.	"Fight against the strong -Remastering 2023-"		4:03
28.	"Flect's thoughts -Remastering 2023-"	Fairchok (lyrics)	1:22
29.	"Surrender -Remastering 2023-"		3:01
30.	"Resolved action -Remastering 2023-"		3:08
31.	"The spirit to succeed -Remastering 2023-"		4:52
32.	"Sacrifice and peace -Remastering 2023-"		2:16
Total length:			74:28

== Other albums ==
=== My Hero Academia The Real 4-D Original Soundtrack ===
My Hero Academia The Real 4-D Original Soundtrack

Soundtrack album by Yuki Hayashi
- Released: May 15, 2024
- Genre: Soundtrack
- Length: 9:14
- Label: Toho Animation
- Producer: Yuki Hayashi

My Hero Academia soundtrack albums chronology
My Hero Academia The Real 4-D Original Soundtrack (2024)	My Hero Academia: All's Justice Original Soundtrack (2026)

My Hero Academia The Real 4-D Original Soundtrack (「僕のヒーローアカデミア・ザ・リアル 4-D」オリジナル・サウンドトラック, 「Boku no Hīrō Akademia・Za・Riaru 4-D」Orijinaru・Saundotorakku) is the soundtrack album to the attraction My Hero Academia The Real 4-D, as part of the "Cool Japan" program held at the Universal Studios Japan. It was composed by Yuki Hayashi and released on May 15, 2024, by Toho Animation Records.

==== Track listing ====
All music is composed by Yuki Hayashi.

My Hero Academia The Real 4-D Original Soundtrack track listing
No.	Title	Length
1.	"Guitar Mind is Here"	0:31
2.	"King Explosion Murder!! USJ Ver."	0:37
3.	"Guitar Mind"	1:01
4.	"Five Sense"	1:44
5.	"The Last Power"	1:48
6.	"Heart's Shout"	1:48
7.	"Heart's Shout -Instrumental-"	1:45
Total length:		9:14

=== My Hero Academia: All's Justice Original Soundtrack ===
My Hero Academia: All's Justice Original Soundtrack

Soundtrack album by Yuki Hayashi
- Released: February 5, 2026
- Genre: Soundtrack
- Length: 69:26
- Label: Toho Animation
- Producer: Yuki Hayashi

My Hero Academia soundtrack albums chronology
My Hero Academia The Real 4-D Original Soundtrack (2024)	My Hero Academia: All's Justice Original Soundtrack (2026)

My Hero Academia: All's Justice Original Soundtrack (『僕のヒーローアカデミア All's Justice』オリジナルサウンドトラック, 『Boku no Hīrō Akademia Ōruzu Jasutisu』Orijinaru Saundotorakku) is the soundtrack album to the fourth video game My Hero Academia: All's Justice. It was composed by Yuki Hayashi and released in Japan by Toho Animation Records on February 5, 2026.

==== Track listing ====
All music is composed by Yuki Hayashi, except where noted.

My Hero Academia: All's Justice Original Soundtrack track listing
No.	Title	Music	Length
1.	"You Say Run -All's Justice Mix-"		4:03
2.	"All's Basic"	Naoyuki Chikatani	1:49
3.	"All Might Statue"	Chikatani	1:52
4.	"Archives Battle"	Chikatani	1:48
5.	"Aglitter Aura"	Chikatani	1:51
6.	"Appealing Shop"	Chikatani	1:50
7.	"Affable Restaurant"	Chikatani	1:54
8.	"Agile Freebattle"	Chikatani	1:52
9.	"Free Run"	Kohei Toda, Hayato	1:10
10.	"Urban Drive"	Chihori Yamada	1:49
11.	"Cosmopolitan Beat"	Yamada	1:38
12.	"We Rise !"	Hayato	2:11
13.	"Unknown Chaos"	Toda	1:43
14.	"Abyss Roar"	Yamada	2:00
15.	"Defying the Shadows"	Toda	2:02
16.	"One Step Forward"	Toda	2:19
17.	"Blitz Rush"	Hayato Matsumura	1:40
18.	"Tactical Beginnings"	Hayato	1:44
19.	"Beacon of Defiance"	Hayato	2:24
20.	"Augmented Imagination"	Tateshi Starwalker	2:12
21.	"Decisive Phase"	Takafumi Machida	2:22
22.	"Faith"	Toda	1:19
23.	"Grip of Tension"	Toda	1:17
24.	"Heroes United"	Hayato	1:10
25.	"Madness"	Toda	1:20
26.	"Sunlit Days"	Hayato	1:22
27.	"Diminished Reality"	Starwalker	1:09
28.	"Edge of Conflict"	Toda, Hayato	1:45
29.	"Resolve"	Hayato	1:11
30.	"Emptiness"	Toda	1:33
31.	"Under Siege"	Yuki Furuhashi	1:36
32.	"obliterate"	Keita Ozawa	1:06
33.	"Guiding Light"	Yamada	1:06
34.	"Though Tears"	Hayato	1:30
35.	"Heroic Pride"	Ryoshi Takagi	2:32
36.	"Decisive Phase ver.2"	Machida	2:20
37.	"Augmented Imagination ver.2"	Starwalker	2:13
38.	"Affection"	Udon Takano	1:37
39.	"Stand as One"	Machida	1:07
Total length:			69:26
