= My Hero Academia season 5 =

Fifth season of My Hero Academia

My Hero Academia
- Season 5
- Cover art for the first home media volume of the fifth season as released by Toho Animation in July 2021
- No. of episodes: 25

Release
- Original network: ytv, NTV
- Original release: March 27 – September 25, 2021

Season chronology
- ← Previous; Season 4 Next → Season 6

The fifth season of the My Hero Academia anime television series was produced by Bones and directed by Kenji Nagasaki (chief director) and Masahiro Mukai, following the story of Kōhei Horikoshi's original My Hero Academia manga series from the 21st volume through the end of the 26th volume. It covers the final parts of "Pro Hero" arc (chapters 190–193), "Joint Training" (chapters 194–217), "Meta Liberation Army" (chapters 218–240) which temporarily shifts the title of the series to My Villain Academia, "Endeavor Agency" (chapters 241–252), (Note: In the anime, this is shown before the "Meta Liberation Army" arc.) and the origin of "Paranormal Liberation War" arc (chapters 253–258). Like the previous three, the season ran in two consecutive cours and aired from March 27 to September 25, 2021, on ytv and NTV.

The season follows Izuku Midoriya, who dreams about the vestiges of the previous One For All users during the Joint Training Battle. In the second half of the season, the League of Villains and the Meta Liberation Army encountered in the Deika City to determine about becoming the most infamous villains; Tomura Shigaraki, who is informed to become All For One's successor, seeks to merge the organizations under his leadership. At the same time, the Hero Public Safety Commission orders a second Hero Work-Studies for students in preparation for the upcoming War.

Crunchyroll and Hulu streamed the season outside of Asia as it aired, and an English dub from Crunchyroll, LLC launched on its service beginning on April 10, 2021. Medialink licensed the series in Southeast Asia and South Asia, and is streaming the season on Netflix, Viu, Bilibili, WeTV, iQIYI, meWatch, and other regional streaming services. The season's English dub aired on Adult Swim's Toonami programming block from May 9 to November 7, 2021. (Note: Adult Swim lists the season as premiering on May 8, 2021, at 12:30 a.m. (24:30) EDT/PDT, which is effectively May 9.)

For the fifth season: the first opening theme song is "No.1" performed by Dish, while the first ending theme song is "Ashiato" (足跡; lit. 'Footprints') performed by the Peggies. The second opening theme song is "Merry-Go-Round" performed by Man with a Mission, while the second ending theme song is "Uso ja Nai" (嘘じゃない; lit. 'Not a Lie') performed by Soshi Sakiyama.

== Episodes ==
| No. overall | No. in season | Title (Note: English translated titles are taken from Crunchyroll.) | Directed by | Storyboarded by | Original release date | English air date | Viewership rating |
|---|---|---|---|---|---|---|---|
| 89 | 1 | "All Hands on Deck! Class 1-A"; Transliteration: "Zen'in Shutsudō! Ichi-nen Ē-gumi" (Japanese: 全員出動！1年A組) | Tsuyoshi Tobita | Masahiro Mukai | March 27, 2021 | May 9, 2021 | 3.2% |
The day after Endeavor's fight with the High-End Nomu, Shota Aizawa starts the class by reminding his students that while their hero licenses are provisional, they still have to act like heroes in an official capacity. He intends to push them harder to reflect the responsibility, as an emergency alarm blares throughout the classroom, leading to Class 1-A being given a training mission to fight hypothetical villains. The class arrives at Ground Beta where it is revealed that Nejire and Tamaki of the Big Three are posing as villains while Mirio plays a civilian in distress. The Class 1-A students each demonstrate their unique skills in taking down the two "villains" and rescuing Mirio, successfully completing the drill. However, Bakugo is angry because he thinks Tamaki went easy on him and retaliates, to Aizawa's annoyance. Meanwhile, recovering from his injuries after his battle, Endeavor thinks back to his encounter with the villain Dabi, while Hawks meets Dabi at an isolated warehouse to discuss some unknown business.
| 90 | 2 | "Vestiges"; Transliteration: "Omokage" (Japanese: 面影) | Shōji Ikeno | Kō Matsuo | April 3, 2021 | May 16, 2021 | 3.4% |
In the aftermath of the battle against the High-End Nomu, Dabi attacks Endeavor and Hawks, only to retreat upon the arrival of Mirko. That night, Dabi and Hawks criticize each other for having changed their plan, with the former stating it will be some time before the latter can meet Shigaraki. Determined to make the world a place for heroes to have some free time, Hawks joined the League of Villains as an undercover spy under orders from the Hero Public Safety Commission to take them down from the inside. Back in present, Hawks visits Endeavor in the hospital and silently apologizes to him. The following day, Endeavor checks out of the hospital and returns home to find a mixed reception from his family members. Fuyumi is happy to see him doing well, however Natsuo is still upset at him for everything he did to their family over the years, leaving soon afterwards. Shoto voices his appreciation for Endeavor the Hero, but still intends to see how Endeavor the father will turn out, as he realizes he cannot seek forgiveness and instead needs to atone for his wrongdoings. Later that night, after a physically draining day, Izuku dreams about All For One and his younger brother, being shown the era when the villain reigned supreme, and the events that led to One For All's creation. Suddenly, the brother approaches him, saying that he wants to show Izuku more of the past, but he is not strong enough to handle it yet. They reach out and touch hands, with the latter telling him it will be fine, and that he is not alone, as he wakes up in shock.
| 91 | 3 | "Clash! Class A vs. Class B!"; Transliteration: "Gekitotsu! Ē-gumi bāsasu Bī-gumi" (Japanese: 激突！A組 VS B組) | Ikurō Satō | Shinji Ishihira | April 10, 2021 | May 23, 2021 | 3.8% |
After discussing his dream with All Might, Izuku is alarmed that the essence of One For All's previous holders live on within the Quirk. Later that day, Class 1-A and 1-B meet at Field Gamma for their first Joint Training Battle. Both classes (along with Hitoshi Shinso from General Studies) are paired up into groups of 4 vs 4 matches that is commentated by Class 1-B's teacher Vlad King. Eraser Head and Vlad King announce the teams, with Shinso being selected to participate in the first match as a part of Class 1-A's team and fifth match as part of 1-B's. Ochaco points out that it was a rematch between Izuku and Shinso since they were opponents in the sports festival, something that Izuku is looking forward to. All Might and Midnight arrive to watch the competition, with All Might revealing that although 1-A has more experience, 1-B has actually improved a lot more, due to them staying out of trouble and steadily improving their skills. Soon after the first match begins, the Class A Team is quickly ambushed by Class B, only for Shinso to turn the tide with his Brainwashing Quirk, now more advanced with his Persona Cords, allowing him to mimic any voice.
| 92 | 4 | "Make It Happen, Shinso!"; Transliteration: "Soreike Shinsō-kun!" (Japanese: それ行け心操くん！) | Tomo Ōkubo | Tomo Ōkubo | April 17, 2021 | May 30, 2021 | 4.2% |
The Class A Team is quickly overwhelmed resulting in the capture of both Kirishima and Koda, although Tsuyu is also able to eliminate Kosei from the match. Improvising a new plan explained by Asui, Kaminari allows himself to be captured which serves their team as the distraction for the Class B Team in order for the threat of Shinso's Quirk to destroy their communication, and for Tsuyu to deliver the finishing blows. Mineta comments that Shinso turns out to be a more serious threat than originally believed, and Midoriya points out that this is because Tsuyu and Kaminari were able to make use of Shinso's abilities and skills. Shinso, Tsuyu, and Kaminari are successfully able to lock Jurota, Shiozaki, and Hiryu together with Kosei in their jail. As Class A celebrates their victory of the first match, Shinso thinks about how far he still needs to go to become the hero he hopes to be. Feeling embarrassed, Vlad King announces the victory of Class 1-A in the first round.
| 93 | 5 | "Operation New Improv Moves"; Transliteration: "Shin Waza Sokkyō Operēshon" (Japanese: 新技即興オペレーション) | Tsuyoshi Tobita | Shinji Satō | April 24, 2021 | June 6, 2021 | 3.6% |
Aizawa asks the Class A team to comment on what they learned or need to improve on; Kirishima says that outside of combat, his Quirk has a very little application, Koda wishes to give more detailed instructions to his insects, Kaminari is happily jumping in the air lamenting about how good he was, Tsuyu wishes Koda and Kirishima were not captured so early to preserve their coordination, and Shinso is frustrated about his inexperience using the Binding Cloth fighting style. After a short break following Match 1, Match 2 begins with Dark Shadow quickly possessed by Kuroiro. During his internship, Tokoyami was frustrated by Hawks using him just for information, so he strove to prove himself as someone to be taken seriously during the work studies. Despite having no interest in training the next generation, Hawks knew all long that Tokoyami just needed a push to embrace his full potential. Having created a new move under Hawks' wing, Tokoyami takes to the skies as Class A begins their counterattack just as Kendo predicted. Suddenly, mushrooms begin to sprout everywhere.
| 94 | 6 | "Foresight"; Transliteration: "Saki o Misuete" (Japanese: 先を見据えて) | Shōji Ikeno | Shōji Ikeno | May 1, 2021 | June 13, 2021 | 4.0% |
Against the Quirks of Kinoko Komori and Manga Fukidashi, the Class A team is divided, with Aoyama captured as a result. Unknown to Momo and Hagakure, Shihai took shelter nearby by phasing into the body of a black mushroom. He laughs and thinks back to the details of Itsuka's plan, where Kuroiro was used due to Dark Shadow being a Quirk with low risks and high rewards in combat, and capitalizing on the fact that the other team is not aware of Shihai's new ability to control dark objects. Due to Aoyama's Navel Laser being a direct counter to Shihai's Quirk, Plan B was developed using Kinoko's Quirk. Kuroiro decides to retreat as Plan B starts to take effect. Fueled by a desire to surpass Momo, Kendo engages her solo. Momo manages to launch a bag of support items across Field Gamma to her team. With the aid of thermal goggles, Tokoyami launches an attack on the hidden Class B Team, capturing them. In a desperate move, Komori enlarges the spores inhaled by Tokoyami, incapacitating him. With an unconscious Momo in tow, an exhausted Kendo captures Hagakure. Despite Class B winning Match 2, Kendo feels the victory is unearned, having failed to surpass Momo's planning. Despite their loss, the Class A students commend their team for their improvements over the school year.
| 95 | 7 | "Match 3"; Transliteration: "Dai San Shiai" (Japanese: 第3試合) | Ikurō Satō | Shinji Ishihira | May 8, 2021 | June 20, 2021 | 4.2% |
While the combatants recover, the combat zone is moved to another section of Field Gamma due to all the damage caused by Class B. In a quieter corner, All Might asks Izuku if he felt something strange with One For All again, as he comments that his master Nana Shimura had never mentioned to him that the Quirk could be activated spontaneously, and is planning to ask Gran Torino if he knows anything about it. Just then Bakugo appears and forces them to reveal their secrets, leading them to discuss what happened in the One For All dream. As Match 3 begins, Tokoyami approaches Todoroki and reminds him that they represent their mentors: the top two heroes. Elsewhere after stopping a wheeled villain, Endeavor impatiently awaits a response from Todoroki, having offered to teach him his signature move the way a father should. The Class A Team's strategy is quickly dismantled by Class B's Honenuki, with Tetsutetsu focused on taking Todoroki out while disobeying Vlad King's orders to keep the damage to a minimum. As Juzo traps Ida and leaves to go help Tetsutetsu, Ida claims that it was foolish for him to consider that he still has such time limit to use his Engine Quirk since the last time he saw it and unleashes Recipro Turbo, a new move derived from a training method passed down from his brother Tensei. He breaks free from ice and heads towards the shocked Juzo.
| 96 | 8 | "Match 3 Conclusion"; Transliteration: "Dai San Shiai Ketchaku" (Japanese: 第3試合決着) | Tomo Ōkubo | Tomo Ōkubo | May 15, 2021 | June 27, 2021 | 3.6% |
Ida proclaims that raising the horsepower of his new ability and lowering the fuel consumption to the minimum, he is now unstoppable in terms of speed for ten minutes. Juzo, realizing he is no match for Ida, sinks into the slushed ice and swims through the mud underneath. Ida stops and notices the ice is solidifying again. As the endurance match between Todoroki and Tetsutetsu rages on, both combatants begin suffering fatigue, leaving Todoroki no choice but to attempt his father's signature move. Honenuki and Ida interfere, resulting in the four combatants getting knocked out in the chaos. Pony rushes in and uses her horns to pick up Todoroki, Juzo, and Tetsutetsu, and carries herself and the students into the air, with Shoji unable to reach them. With the time-limit reached and most of the combatants either imprisoned or incapacitated, Match 3 is a draw. Kaminari and Kirishima whine about how unsatisfying the outcome is, though Jurota reminds them that running away and seeking help is a viable strategy. In Recovery Girl's office, Todoroki and Ida reflect on what they need to improve, with Honenuki excitedly hoping for a rematch someday. Match 4 begins and Bakugo is ready to show Midoriya his growth.
| 97 | 9 | "Early Bird!"; Transliteration: "Sente Hisshō!" (Japanese: 先手必勝！) | Tsuyoshi Tobita | Shinji Satō | May 22, 2021 | July 4, 2021 | 4.0% |
The Match 4 begins where both teams start making their moves. On Class 1-B's side, everyone is worried about how well-balanced their opponent's team is. Due to this, they decide to rush the opposing team as quickly as possible. Creating a plan targeting Bakugo's selfish traits, the Class B Team quickly works to overwhelm Class A, only to be driven back by their perfect teamwork. Bakugo declares his intention to always seek a perfect victory and that includes not letting a single member of his team fall, as all the members are able to support each other in tandem. In the end, Match 4 finishes in 5 minutes with a total victory for Class A. Eraser Head commends his team for their support skills, quick capturing time, and keeping collateral damage to a minimum, while Vlad King tells his team that their plan was great, but it needed to be more flexible, like Juzo's was. A dejected Setsuna apologizes for letting her team down, but Togaru tells everyone to keep their chins up. Afterwards, Bakugo awkwardly shrugs off Izuku and All Might's compliments. As Match 5 nears, Monoma and his team begin discussing their strategy, with their main focus being to take Izuku down first. Elsewhere, Izuku practices with One For All, and the Quirk operates no different from usual. At long last, the final match of Joint Training begins.
| 98 | 10 | "That Which Is Inherited"; Transliteration: "Uketsugu Mono" (Japanese: 受け継ぐモノ) | Shōji Ikeno | Shinji Satō | May 29, 2021 | July 11, 2021 | 3.6% |
In Tartarus Prison, All For One oddly hears the voice of his brother which disturbs the guards. All Might is concerned when Gran Torino mentions a previous holder of One For All once told Nana Shimura "the time has not yet come". As the Class 1-A team make their way forward, Izuku thinks about how with Shinso in Class 1-B's team, they will not be able to talk much once they engaged just like in sports festival. Izuku is also still being uneasy about what happened with One For All, wanting to be careful to avoid Shinso's Quirk. Enacting his clever trap, Monoma confronts Izuku, riling him up by declaring Bakugo at fault for All Might's end, causing him to attack in anger. Black tendrils suddenly sprout from his arm, rampaging through Field Gamma. Believing that heroes need protecting as well, Ochaco restrains Izuku while Shinso uses his Quirk to brainwash him. The tendrils subside and Izuku awakes in the vestige world, meeting a previous holder of One For All. The tendrils are the man's original Quirk, Blackwhip, which manifested in response to Izuku's intent to capture Monoma. The man explains that the core of One For All has grown so large, the Quirks of the previous holders are manifesting within Izuku. Regaining consciousness, Izuku and Ochaco go on the defense as Match 5 turns into an all-out brawl.
| 99 | 11 | "Our Brawl"; Transliteration: "Bokura no Dai Ransen" (Japanese: ぼくらの大乱戦) | Ikurō Satō | Takashi Kawabata | June 5, 2021 | July 18, 2021 | 3.8% |
Despite the danger of Blackwhip's rampage, Aizawa allows the match to continue for the sake of the combatants' ambitions. Copying One For All, Monoma attempts to attack Ochaco, only for the Quirk to oddly do nothing. Shinso intervenes, unintentionally giving Izuku a way to engage him. The two begin their rematch, with Shinso pulling two pipes down on Izuku, only to be countered by Blackwhip. Ochaco proceeds to drag the captured Monoma to their prison, and after dropping him off, she goes to help Ashido and Mineta and leave Shinso to Izuku, agreeing to trust in him. Together, Ochaco and the others defeat the remaining Class B team members, and Izuku manages to pin Shinso down. Midnight announces the conclusion of the match with Class 1-A winning 4-0, restating the results for each of the matches, resulting in Class 1-A being the overall winners which they applaud themselves for. Eraser Head talks to Izuku about what was going on with him, with the other students also being intrigued. Trying to find the best way to explain it, Izuku tells them that he was not sure either, he was just overflowing with power and could not control it but thanks to Ochaco and Shinso for saving him. Despite his defeat and being unable to show his growth to Midoriya, Shinso cannot help but smile in amazement about Class A and B. Afterwards, he earns a passing grade for his transfer into the Hero Course.
| 100 | 12 | "The New Power and All For One"; Transliteration: "Atarashii Chikara to Ōru・Fō・Wan" (Japanese: 新しい力とオール・フォー・ワン) | Tomo Ōkubo | Kō Matsuo (Note: Credited on the website but not in the episode.) & Tomo Ōkubo (Note: Credited in the episode but not on the website.) | June 12, 2021 | July 25, 2021 | 3.9% |
As Shinso accepts the transfer into the Hero Course for the next year, several students ask whether he will be in Class A or B, but they say the time will come for that. Later at night, Izuku and Bakugo spar in Gym Gamma in hope of getting Blackwhip to manifest, which they are unable to as Izuku acknowledges that since he refused to use the Quirk until he better mastered One For All, it will not manifest until then. Bakugo leaves Izuku deep in thought after pointing out how One For All has become quite similar to All For One. The students of Class 1-A and 1-B proceed to hang out in Heights Alliance after their Joint Training session. The next day, Aizawa brings Monoma to the dorm in hope of him being able to help Eri train by copying her Quirk. Monoma is unable to do so as his Quirk does not work well with those that require energy to activate, like what happened when he attempted to copy One For All. With encouraging words from Izuku, Eri still intends to master her Quirk, with the feeling mutual for Izuku. Having finally earned their Hero Licenses, Bakugo and Todoroki take to the snowy streets and defeat a gang of thieves. Later, the duo arrive back at the dorm, only to be greeted with a surprise party by the rest of the class for passing the exam.
| 101 | 13 | "Have a Merry Christmas!"; Transliteration: "Merire! Kurisumasu! (Note: Merry! Christmas!)" (Japanese: メリれ！クリスマス！) | Shōji Ikeno | Shōji Ikeno | June 19, 2021 | August 1, 2021 | 3.6% |
While Japan deals with the aftermath of the destruction of Deika City 9 days earlier, Izuku and the other students of Class 1-A begin interview training. Visualizing unlocking One For All, Izuku is able to properly manifest a little of Blackwhip for just a second. While Izuku is happy about this development, everyone else is completely dumbfounded. Meanwhile, Principal Nezu visits All Might who begins researching what he can on One For All's previous holders. He informs All Might that the Hero Public Safety Commission will be restarting the Hero Work-Studies soon, much to All Might's surprise. Class 1-A partakes in interview training with Midnight and guest speaker Mt. Lady; Eraser Head notes to a traumatized Mineta that Mt. Lady's attitude switching from "showbiz" to making people feel safe stems from Endeavor's change in behavior. As winter vacation begins, Class 1-A, plus Eri, celebrates their first Christmas together with a gift exchange, putting their presents in a pile and each choosing one at random. Izuku and Ochaco get each others' gifts; Eri gets Tokoyami's buster sword. The excitement causes Izuku to think about how even though their future is uncertain, he hopes they can all have this much fun next Christmas. With the work studies program returning, Izuku and Bakugo have nowhere to go to, with Nighteye Agency being too busy and Best Jeanist is missing. Todoroki makes an offer for them to join him at Endeavor's hero agency.
| 102 | 14 | "Off to Endeavor's Agency!"; Transliteration: "Iza! Endevā Jimusho!" (Japanese: いざ！エンデヴァー事務所！) | Ikurō Satō | Takashi Kawabata | June 26, 2021 | August 1, 2021 | 3.9% |
A few weeks earlier, Hawks is given another chance by Dabi to join the League of Villains and visits Best Jeanist to check on his recovery, pulling a feather blade on the hero when his back is turned. After celebrating New Year's Eve with his mother, Izuku heads off to begin his work studies. Meanwhile, Hawks appears at a mansion where he is approached by Slidin' Go, who attempts to lecture Hawks for going off on his own, but a mysterious man with a laptop berates Slidin' Go for trying to act superior; thanks to Hawks' status and connections, he has far more useful information for them to use. Endeavor meets his new interns in the city and has to cut the talk short to stop an attempted attack by a doomsday theory-spouting villain. The three students follow him in attempt to aid the No. 1 Pro Hero, but just as Izuku and Bakugo were about to attack the thugs, Hawks suddenly arrives and disposes of them. After helping to defeat the villain and his minions, Hawks strangely hands a copy of Destro's Meta Liberation War to Endeavor and recommends the book's highlighted passages. Noticing the way Hawks is acting, Endeavor immediately realizes something is wrong. While the interns are welcomed to Endeavor's agency by his sidekicks, the Hero returns to his office and studies Destro's book. Endeavor connects specific letters in the highlighted sections together as a secret message from Hawks. In four months, the Meta Liberation Army will attack Japan.
| 103 | 15 | "One Thing at a Time"; Transliteration: "Hitotsu Hitotsu" (Japanese: 一つ一つ) | Tsuyoshi Tobita | Tomo Ōkubo | July 10, 2021 | August 15, 2021 | 3.5% |
With Hawks' message in hand, Endeavor now understands the true reason behind the Hero Public Safety Commission bringing back the Work Study program: to ensure everyone is ready for the forthcoming attack of Shigaraki and his combined forces. Accepting Midoriya and Bakugo as his students, Endeavor first seeks to understand what each has to work on. Izuku hopes to master all of his other Quirks, and Bakugo desires to know what he is missing besides strength. Todoroki interjects, intending to learn everything he can from Endeavor, to become someone like All Might. Endeavor sets a goal for his interns, to defeat a villain before he can by the work studies' end. Thinking of Tokoyami and the other young heroes of the next generation, Hawks sets his own goal: to ensure the villains will not succeed, and hopefully everyone will still be smiling by spring. Endeavor talks about how everyone uses parallel processing subconsciously, using the example of a driver who through practice was able to do everything without thinking. He tells Izuku that first he needs to learn how to do two things at once without thinking, and once he succeeds, to throw in another thing. He concludes telling them to take everything they learned in school and apply it to real experience, stating that they can practice and fail as much as they want, as it will not have any effect on his work. Izuku thinks about how much he has grown and gained thanks to All Might, yet still has a lot to learn and that he will go beyond, one thing at a time.
| 104 | 16 | "Long Time No See, Selkie"; Transliteration: "Ohisashiburi Desu Serukī-san" (Japanese: お久しぶりですセルキーさん) | Ikurō Satō, Shōji Ikeno & Sayaka Morikawa | Shinji Ishihira | July 17, 2021 | August 22, 2021 | 2.8% |
The Oki Mariner Crew is pursuing a ship carrying chemicals used to make an illegal Quirk Booster drug. Due to the difficult situation, Selkie requests a team up with the Ryukyu agency. Ryukyu, Ochaco, Tsuyu, and Nejire arrive, and Selkie has the young heroes relax on the beach for the day to boost their morale. As the sun sets, the heroes take to the ocean while the smugglers attempt another escape. Selkie and Tsuyu board the ship, but a cargo plane carrying the chemicals starts to take off. Sirius fires a harpoon carrying Ochaco, who utilizes the grappling hook in her new costume to latch onto the plane. Ochaco takes out the smuggler and with help from Ryukyu and Nejire, lands the plane safely. Afterwards, Selkie and Ryukyu discuss how the smugglers' client had used a fake name and that the chemicals were supposed to be brought to Otheon, Europe. Meanwhile, in a cathedral, a mysterious man hears about the news of the heroes disrupting the cargo delivery. However, he declares it to be fine as he already has the amount needed to prepare for the "salvation of humanity". Note: This episode acts as a tie-in prologue for the film My Hero Academia: World Heroes' Mission.
| 105 | 17 | "The Hellish Todoroki Family"; Transliteration: "Jigoku no Todoroki-kun Chi" (Japanese: 地獄の轟くん家) | Shōji Ikeno | Takashi Kawabata | July 24, 2021 | August 29, 2021 | 3.3% |
A week into the work studies, Endeavor gets a call from Fuyumi who suggests bringing the trio home for dinner. The dinner soon gets uncomfortable as the conversation switches from being about Fuyumi's cooking to how Endeavor prevented Shoto from eating Natsuo's cooking. A disgruntled Natsuo soon gets up and leaves. After dinner, Izuku and Bakugo overhear Shoto and Fuyumi talking about everything. Shoto says he cannot forgive Endeavor so easily for what he did to their mother and is unsure of how to feel. Bakugo barges his way in, yelling at them not to talk about sensitive subjects in front of guests, which led Izuku to apologize and tell her they knew about everything already. Izuku tells Todoroki that he believes he is getting ready to forgive Endeavor, and that it is fine to not be able to forgive him if he wants. Endeavor thinks about what he can do for his family after all this time, praying at the altar, and wishes that Toya could have been there too. A few days earlier, a hooded man is released from prison and walks around a Christmas-decorated bazaar, gleefully smiling when he comes across a television playing Endeavor's victory over the High-End.
| 106 | 18 | "The Unforgiven"; Transliteration: "Yurusarezaru Mono" (Japanese: 許されざる者) | Tsuyoshi Tobita | Shinji Satō | July 31, 2021 | September 5, 2021 | 3.2% |
Fuyumi explains to Izuku and Bakugo that Natsuo was very close to their brother Toya, causing him to blame Endeavor for his death. Eventually, the time has come for Endeavor to bring the trio back to U.A. High, with Endeavor thanking Fuyumi for setting everything up, and her thanking Izuku for being Shoto's friend. Shortly after, their car is soon attacked by street whitelines, controlled by a villain named Ending, with Natsuo held hostage. Ending emotionally explains that heroes cannot kill, but since Endeavor had to kill the High-End Nomu, he can do it again. Natsuo's scared face causes Endeavor to hesitate. Ending launches nearby cars into the air, and hangs Natsuo in front of a moving train. Bakugo saves Natsuo, Izuku uses Blackwhip to grab the cars, and Todoroki captures Ending. After hugging Natsuo, Endeavor apologizes to him as he never intended on avoiding his kids, but still ran away from his responsibilities. Natsuo has no intention of ever forgiving him and Endeavor says it is okay since he just wants to atone. The police arrive to take Ending away, while Natsuo thanks the three for saving him; Bakugo then reveals that he does have a hero name, but angrily refuses to tell his classmates until he tells someone else first. Endeavor decides the best thing he can do for his family is to ensure they live happily without him.
| 107 | 19 | "More of a Hero Than Anyone"; Transliteration: "Dare Yori mo Omae wa Hīrō ni" (Japanese: 誰よりもおまえはヒーローに) | Masashi Abe | Shinji Satō | August 14, 2021 | September 12, 2021 | 4.4% |
While Class 1-A celebrates the start of the third semester, Eraser Head and Present Mic are summoned to Tartarus Prison by Detective Tsukauchi and Gran Torino. Therefore, the two learn that Kurogiri is a Nomu created using the corpse of their school friend Oboro Shirakumo. Since the Nomu retain some of their former personalities, Aizawa and Mic are asked to talk to Kurogiri in the hopes of getting information about the League of Villains. Once awake, Kurogiri grows concerned about Shigaraki's whereabouts, disturbing Aizawa since Shirakumo was always concerned for others. Aizawa and Mic bring up tales from their school days and have an emotional breakdown as they reveal just how much Shirakumo's friendship and death affected them. Kurogiri's programming fails, allowing Shirakumo's conscious to take over. Seeing his friends again, Shirakumo is only able to choke out "Hospital" before succumbing to Kurogiri again. This new clue is sent to Hawks, while he is at that moment teaching Twice the ideology of the Meta Liberation Army. As he heads out to get a drink, he gleefully thinks about how the pieces are falling into place. Elsewhere, All For One's doctor laughs maniacally as Shigaraki's process of becoming his ultimate masterpiece is progressing better than expected.
| 108 | 20 | "My Villain Academia"; Transliteration: "Boku no Viran Akademia" (Japanese: 僕のヴィランアカデミア) | Ikurō Satō & Takanori Yano | Kō Matsuo | August 21, 2021 | September 19, 2021 | 4.3% |
Two months earlier, Gigantomachia appears before the League of Villains, declaring Shigaraki unworthy of being All For One's successor. During the attack, the League is teleported to the lab of All For One's assistant, Dr. Kyudai Garaki. Dr. Garaki intends to help Shigaraki in his goal of destroying everything that irritates him, but before Shigaraki can be granted power, he must defeat Gigantomachia to gain his loyalty. The League returns to Gigantomachia and continue their battle, while Dr. Garaki asks Dabi to help him test out a High-End Nomu, even though he is still less than interested. A month and a half later, the League of Villains have made no progress in defeating Gigantomachia, but Shigaraki's strength and skill has been increasing. Intending to talk to Giran, Twice is alarmed to find out that the League's broker has been captured and tortured by Re-Destro, leader of the Meta Liberation Army. Twice angrily asks what happened, who he says is still alive, currently tied up next to him. He declares the Liberation Army's objective to liberate meta powers and rebuild the world where people can freely use their abilities. Re-Destro invites the League of Villains to Deika City to face an ultimatum. Spinner questions on how to deal with their supposed over 110,000 army, with Shigaraki revealing that he knows Gigantomachia is not invincible, and since he will come after him no matter where he is, he will lure the beast to the Liberation Army and let them fight each other which will finally wear him out. Shigaraki accepts, smiling at the prospect of Gigantomachia crushing his challenger's forces.
| 109 | 21 | "Revival Party"; Transliteration: "Sairin-sai" (Japanese: 再臨祭) | Masatoyo Takada | Takashi Kawabata | August 28, 2021 | September 26, 2021 | 4.6% |
Among the chaos after superpowers first appeared in the world, a popular ideology started to spread among the metahumans: the freedom to use their meta abilities rather than suppress them. A man named Destro brought many people who followed this ideology together and formed the Meta Liberation Army. After a couple of years, the group were defeated by the government, with most of the members being arrested and the Army dissolved. While in prison, Destro wrote the Meta Liberation War book, before committing suicide. Back in the present, Deika City's welcoming party for the League quickly turns into an ambush, causing everyone to get separated. Toga is soon surrounded by Curious and her supporters. Intending to understand why Toga is the way she is, including why she attacked and drank the blood of a classmate in middle school, Curious overwhelms Toga with her explosive arsenal. Toga does not know what a normal life is, just that she wants to be the people she loves. Due to her near death state, Toga's Quirk evolves, unintentionally allowing her to use Ochaco's Zero Gravity, dropping Curious and her supporters from the sky, killing them. Elsewhere, Shigaraki demonstrates his evolved Quirk as well, killing those beyond who he has touched. While Dabi begins his battle with the ice user Geten, Twice finds an unconscious Toga only to be surrounded by Skeptic's puppets that were modified to look like an unmasked Twice.
| 110 | 22 | "Sad Man's Parade"; Transliteration: "Saddo Manzu Parēdo" (Japanese: サッドマンズパレード) | Shōji Ikeno | Shōji Ikeno | September 4, 2021 | October 3, 2021 | 4.5% |
Captured, Twice can do nothing as Skeptic's puppets attempt to snap Toga's neck. In the tower, Giran is surprised to learn that Twice is there, as Re-Destro and Skeptic explain that they are taking advantage of his psychological trauma in order to break him. Jin thinks back to his past, recalling a moment when he was sixteen where he accidentally ran over a man with his motorcycle, resulting in them getting a broken arm. He was alone due to his parents dying when he was in middle school, and never being close to any of his relatives. The only ones he could talk to were his Doubles, who comment on his natural bad luck, while he just wanted to be with someone he could trust and who trusted him. He decided to indulge, creating more doubles of himself, having fun committing all sorts of crimes, until it reached his biggest mistake, when his doubles turned on him leaving him alone once again, unable to trust himself. Faced with the pain of his arms being broken, Twice finally realizes that he is not a double and unleashes thousands of doubles of himself. Determined to not let his friends die, the Twice doubles swarm Deika City, helping to turn the tide in the League's favor. To ensure Shigaraki's survival, Dr. Garaki calls upon Gigantomachia, urging him to protect All For One's successor. Twice's double reaches Re-Destro's tower to rescue Giran, but is no match for Re-Destro's Stress power, which converts his stress into speed and strength, even with doubles of the League on his side. Shigaraki decays the base of the tower, bringing it all crumbling down. While the Twice doubles protect Giran, Shigaraki comes face-to-face with Re-Destro.
| 111 | 23 | "Tenko Shimura: Origin"; Transliteration: "Shimura Tenko: Orijin" (Japanese: 志村転弧：オリジン) | Takayuki Yamamoto | Shinji Satō | September 11, 2021 | October 10, 2021 | 3.7% |
Re-Destro, increasing his size and strength though his stress, overwhelms Shigaraki, destroying his left hand and the hands he wears all over his body, causing him to experience flashes of his deceased family. As a child, Tenko Shimura (Shigaraki) lives under the one harsh rule of his father Kotaro: never talk about heroes, as they do nothing but hurt their own families to help strangers. Tenko is left outside alone without food, with Nao and his grandparents, Chizuo and Mako, questioning Kotaro's actions. Nao notes how his allergies have gotten worse, while Kotaro mentions how he has not manifested a Quirk yet, so he is doing this to prevent Tenko from more suffering. Despite this, Tenko's sister Hana sneaks into Kotaro's room and show him a picture of their grandmother, Nana Shimura. However, Tenko's excitement is slapped away by his father's rage, while his family watches on, unsure of what to do. Thinking back to when Nana abandoned him to the foster system to keep him safe, Kotaro realizes he made a mistake. Tenko's Quirk, "Decay", manifests, killing his entire family one by one, even his mother as she attempts to comfort him. He attempts to beg his father for help, but Kotaro panics and attacks him, scarring Tenko's face. Enraged, Tenko jumps on his father and purposely kills him with his Decay. Among the blood and rubble, Tenko feels a strange sense of pleasure and acknowledges that he may have wanted this all along.
| 112 | 24 | "Tomura Shigaraki: Origin"; Transliteration: "Shigaraki Tomura: Orijin" (Japanese: 死柄木弔：オリジン) | Ikurō Satō | Takashi Kawabata | September 18, 2021 | November 7, 2021 | 3.8% |
Ignored by bystanders, Tenko wandered the city streets alone, hoping for a helping hand, which he got in All For One. Dr. Garaki asks All For One about Tenko's lost memories, with the latter saying they still remain within him, and that he has become unstable with them locked away, even Decay being held back from its true power. All For One states that he will become the next "Symbol of Fear" that has taken its first big step forward. In the aftermath of killing the two hoodlums in two tries, Tenko thinks about how he feels both sick, and at peace. Thus, Tenko was slowly groomed into a villain name that he is currently: Tomura Shigaraki, taken from a Japanese word meaning "to mourn" and All For One's last name. Back in the present, consumed with a sense of freedom, Shigaraki unleashes the full power of his Quirk, turning Deika City into nothing but a crater. Believing that Shigaraki is the embodiment of Destro's ideology, Re-Destro declares that he and the Meta Liberation Army will follow him. At the same time, Gigantomachia acknowledges Shigaraki as All For One's successor. Over the next week, the Liberation Army's influence makes quick work to cover up the truth of what happened at Deika City. In their newly constructed mansion headquarters, the League of Villains and the Meta Liberation Army merge forces into the Paranormal Liberation Front as its lieutenants are announced before Gigantomachia and the assembled members, including an undercover Hawks. Due to the injuries he sustained, Re-Destro's damaged legs were amputated and he now moves around in a high-tech chair. Pleased with what he has seen, Garaki offers a recovering Shigaraki more power.
| 113 | 25 | "The High, Deep Blue Sky"; Transliteration: "Sora, Takaku Gunjō" (Japanese: 空、高く群青) | Tsuyoshi Tobita | Kō Matsuo | September 25, 2021 | November 7, 2021 | 3.9% |
Hawks, undercover within the Paranormal Liberation Front, has put all the pieces together except for one: Shigaraki's sponsor Dr. Garaki. Meanwhile, Shigaraki meets Garaki who talks about how his Quirk had evolved in the fight, allowing him to Decay not just what he touches, but what is connected to it. Garaki proceeds to perform the experiments necessary to give Shigaraki power that will let him surpass All For One and obtain One For All. Back in the present, Class 1-A shows off the new abilities and skills that they learned in their work studies. After the showcase, Izuku goes to see Ochaco and tell her that he was able to control the Blackwhip successfully, thanking her again for what she did when it first emerged. Ochaco laughs it off, adding that the incident was what inspired her to add ropes to her arsenal, feeling like they both have improved, as the two happily fist bump. In the teacher's dorms, Eraser Head and Present Mic recover after the Oboro Shirakumo revelation, and are then approached by Mirio and Tamaki, informing that Eri's horn has started to act up again, using his Quirk to calm her down. Later, All Might meets Izuku and Bakugo in the conference room, handing them a booklet containing all the information on the previous One For All users he could uncover. He reveals that the Quirks are not powerful, as their users were simply entrusted by each other to pass the Quirk along, and also reveals the next Quirk that Izuku will receive is his master's, Float. That night, Class 1-A throws a party celebrating the beginning of the third term and Izuku thinks back to how much his life has changed, and how blessed he feels. Three months later, all hero course students are summoned for a joint operation with the pro heroes. Unbeknownst to them all, the war with the Paranormal Liberation Front is about to begin and hero society will never be the same.

== Home media release ==
=== Japanese ===
Toho Animation released the fifth season of the anime on Blu-ray and DVD in four volumes in Japan, with the first volume released on July 21, 2021, and the final volume released on January 19, 2022.

Toho Animation (Japan – Region 2/A)
| Volume | Episodes | Release date | Ref. |
|---|---|---|---|
| 1 | 89–95 | July 21, 2021 | |
| 2 | 96–101 | September 22, 2021 | |
| 3 | 102–107 | November 24, 2021 | |
| 4 | 108–113 | January 19, 2022 | |

=== English ===
Crunchyroll (formerly known as Funimation) released the first part of the fifth season on home media on March 29, 2022, and the second part on December 19, 2022. The complete parts of two volumes received a Blu-ray release on October 14, 2024.

Crunchyroll, LLC (North America – Region 1/A)
| Part | | Episodes | Release date | Ref. |
|---|---|---|---|---|
| Season 5 | 1 | 89–101 | March 29, 2022 | |
| Season 5 | 2 | 102–113 | December 19, 2022 | |
| Season 5 | Complete | 89–113 | October 14, 2024 | |

Madman Entertainment (Australia and New Zealand – Region 4/B)
| Part | | Episodes | Release date | Ref. |
|---|---|---|---|---|
| Season 5 | 1 | 89–101 | May 25, 2022 | |
| Season 5 | 2 | 102–113 | February 8, 2023 | |
