= Masahiro Mukai =

Japanese anime director

- 向井雅浩
- Occupation: Anime director
- Years active: 2004–present
- Known for: Hyperdimension Neptunia: The Animation; Trickster; My Hero Academia

Masahiro Mukai (Japanese: 向井雅浩, Hepburn: Mukai Masahiro) is a Japanese anime director. In 2004, he joined Sunrise and worked on Mobile Suit Gundam SEED Destiny. After leaving Sunrise, he was put in charge of directing Hyperdimension Neptunia: The Animation in 2013, and Trickster in 2017. Under the chief direction of Kenji Nagasaki, Mukai served as director for the anime adaptation of My Hero Academia from its fourth through sixth seasons.

== Biography ==
Mukai was a fan of the Gundam series in elementary school, which later inspired him to work in the anime industry. He later joined Sunrise and started working on Mobile Suit Gundam SEED Destiny as a production assistant, which was the first series he worked on. Mukai left Sunrise around 2008, and following his departure from the company started working as an episode director. In the early 2010s, he did work for a few Shaft series where he worked with director Akiyuki Shinbo, whom Mukai considers to be a mentor. In 2013, he debuted as series director for the first time with Hyperdimension Neptunia: The Animation. In 2017, Mukai directed the Trickster anime television series.

That same year, Mukai served as episode director for the second season of Blood Blockade Battlefront. While working on the series, he was approached by My Hero Academia producer Yoshihiro Ōyabu to serve as director for the series starting with the fourth season, which Mukai accepted.

== Works ==
- Puella Magi Madoka Magica (2011) (episode director)
- Level E (2011) (episode director)
- Hyperdimension Neptunia: The Animation (2013) (director)
- Space Dandy (2014) (episode director)
- Terror in Resonance (2014) (episode director)
- Kamisama Kiss (2015) (episode director)
- Blood Blockade Battlefront (2015–2017) (episode director)
- Trickster (2017–2018) (director)
- Mob Psycho 100 (2019) (storyboard artist)
- My Hero Academia (2019–2023) (director)
