= Dish (band) =

Japanese pop/rock band and dance group

- Origin: Japan
- Genres: Dance-rock; electropop; synthrock; rap rock
- Years active: 2011–present
- Label: Sony Music Records
- Members: Daichi Izumi; Masaki Yabe; Takumi Kitamura; To-i Tachibana
- Past members: Ryuji Kobayashi
- Website: www.dish-web.com

Dish (stylized as DISH//) is a Japanese pop/rock band and dance group managed by Stardust Promotion. The group is a dancing rock band, they show unique performances by dancing while playing instruments.

Dish was formed on December 25, 2011 under Stardust Promotion as part of Ebidan. On June 10, 2012, they officially debuted under Stardust Records with their Single "It's Alright". On June 19, 2013, Dish had their major debut for single "I Can Hear" under Sony Music Records which was chosen as the 25th ending theme song for the anime, Naruto Shippuden. Dish's third major single, "Freak Show", was produced by Kenichi Maeyamada.

The group name Dish stands for "being everyone's main dish", because of their band name they started a tradition of throwing custom-made paper plates to their audience during their live performances.

In January 2017, during their New Year Nippon Budokan concert, the band announced that former CustomiZ member Daichi Izumi would join Dish as their drummer.

In 2020, they released "Neko (the First Take version)", which written by Aimyon, peaked No.11 in Japan Hot 100. Their fourth major label studio album, 2021's X, features collaborations with Glim Spanky, Haruko Nagaya from Ryokuōshoku Shakai, and JQ from Nulbarich.

2021 also saw the band sing "No.1", the first opening theme of the fifth season of the anime series My Hero Academia, and "Shout It Out", the theme song of the Japanese dub of the film Venom: Let There Be Carnage.

== Members ==
- Daichi Izumi (泉大智) – drums
- Masaki Yabe (矢部昌暉) – vocals, guitars
- Takumi Kitamura (北村匠海) – vocalist, guitars
- To-i Tachibana (橘柊生) – rapper/DJ

Former member(s)

- Ryuji Kobayashi (小林龍二) – bass guitar

== Discography ==
Dish discography
- Studio albums: 6
- EPs: 3
- Compilation albums: 2
- Singles: 18

=== Studio albums ===
No.	Title	Release date	Charts
No.	Title	Release date	JPN
Major albums
1	Main Dish	January 14, 2015	5
2	Mashiagare no Gatling (召し上がれのガトリング)	December 14, 2016	4
3	Junkfood Junction	April 3, 2019	2
4	X	February 24, 2021	4
5	Triangle	February 1, 2023	1
6	aRange	April 1, 2026	5

=== Compilation albums ===
No.	Title	Release date	Charts
No.	Title	Release date	JPN
1	Sai (再)	April 6, 2022	10
2	Ao (青)	September 7, 2022	12

=== Mini-albums ===
No.	Title	Release date	Charts
No.	Title	Release date	JPN
1	Circle	February 26, 2020	5
2	Happy	August 9, 2023	8
3	Gunjyo Hiko (群青飛行)	March 26, 2025	5

=== CD singles ===
No.	Title	Release date	Charts
No.	Title	Release date	JPN
Indie singles
1	It's Alright	June 10, 2012	–
2	Peter Pan Syndrome (ピーターパンシンドローム)	October 10, 2012	–
3	Give Me Chocolate! (ギブミーチョコレート!)	February 13, 2013	17
Major singles
1	I Can Hear	June 19, 2013	9
2	Hareru Ya! (晴れるYA!)	October 16, 2013	4
3	Freak Show	March 5, 2014	5
4	Saisho no Koi (Motetakute) / Flame (サイショの恋～モテたくて～ / FLAME)	June 25, 2014	2
5	Hengao de Bye Bye!! (変顔でバイバイ!!)	December 3, 2014	2
6	Yay!! Natsuyasumi (イエ～ィ!!☆夏休み)	July 3, 2015	3
7	Oretachi Rookies (俺たちルーキーズ)	November 4, 2015	2
8	High-Voltage Dancer	June 22, 2016	2
9	I'm Fish	June 7, 2017	3
10	Bokutachi ga Yarimashita (僕たちがやりました)	August 16, 2017	4
11	Katte ni My Soul (勝手にMy Soul)	February 21, 2018	4
12	Starting Over	July 11, 2018	2
13	No.1	May 26, 2021	7
14	Chinchoge (沈丁花)	November 17, 2021	9
15	Replay	October 5, 2022	11

=== Digital singles ===
No.	Title	Release date	Charts
No.	Title	Release date	JPN
-	Bokutachi ga Yarimashita (僕たちがやりました)	July 18, 2017	-
1	NOT FLUNKY	July 17, 2019	-
2	PM 5:30	November 9, 2019	-
-	Neko ~The First Take ver.~ (猫 ～THE FIRST TAKE ver.～)	April 29, 2020	7
3	Bokura ga tsuyoku. (僕らが強く。)	August 12, 2020	-
-	Shape of Love From THE FIRST TAKE	December 25, 2020	-
4	Atarimae (あたりまえ)	January 15, 2021	-
5	Ari no manma ga itoshii kimi e (ありのまんまが愛しい君へ)	September 24, 2021	-
6	Shiwakucha na kumo wo daite (しわくちゃな雲を抱いて)	July 13, 2022	17
-	Plan A	July 14, 2024	14

=== Other singles ===
No.	Title	Release date	Charts	Notes
No.	Title	Release date	JPN	Notes
Major singles
–	Itsuka wa Merry Christmas (いつかはメリークリスマス)	December 4, 2013	8	Special Christmas single
–	JK//	March 29, 2017	11	First DVD single
