= My Hero Ultra Rumble =

2023 video game

- Cover art
- Developer: Byking
- Publisher: Bandai Namco Entertainment
- Director: Tatsumi Kimoto
- Producers: Masahiko Inotani; Atsushi Sato
- Programmer: Soji Seta
- Artists: Yu Shimotori; Naoyuki Takano
- Composer: Masahiro Aoki
- Series: My Hero Academia
- Engine: Unreal Engine 4
- Platforms: Nintendo Switch; PlayStation 4; Windows; Xbox One; Android; iOS
- Release: NS, PS4, Win, XBO; September 28, 2023; Android, iOS; TBA
- Genres: Battle royale, action
- Modes: Single-player, multiplayer

My Hero Ultra Rumble, known in Japan as My Hero Academia: Ultra Rumble, (Note: Japanese: 僕のヒーローアカデミア ULTRA RUMBLE(ウルトラ ランブル), Hepburn: Boku no Hīrō Akademia Urutora Ranburu) is a 2023 free-to-play battle royale game developed by Byking and published by Bandai Namco Entertainment for Nintendo Switch, PlayStation 4, Windows, and Xbox One in September 2023, with a separate mobile version in development for Android and iOS. Ultra Rumble is the fourth console game based on Kōhei Horikoshi's manga series My Hero Academia—following the 3D fighting games Battle for All (2016), One's Justice (2018), and One's Justice 2 (2020)—and the third to be developed by Byking.

== Gameplay ==
Ultra Rumble is a third-person battle royale action game which also incorporates elements of multiplayer online battle arena (MOBA) games. The game can be played against other players online, or against CPU opponents offline. Matches feature up to 24 players, divided into eight teams of three by default, with separate modes for two-person teams and solos added in later updates.

Like other battle royale games, players compete across a periodically-shrinking map until only one team remains. Each character has three Quirk skills to use in combat—which have varying cooldowns between uses, depending on their strength—and a unique action, such as Izuku's ability to carry a downed teammate out of harm's way. In addition to combat, players explore the map to collect items, such as cards to upgrade the strength of Quirk skills, or potions that increase the "Guard Point" gauge which prevents damage and knockback.

=== Characters ===
Playable characters are sorted into five groups—Assault, Rapid, Strike, Support and Technical—depending on their playstyle. Six characters are unlocked by default, while additional characters and cosmetics can be acquired through a gacha system. Some characters and cosmetics can also be unlocked via the "Special License", a battle pass that can either be leveled up by playing a large number of matches, or using microtransactions. Players are also occasionally given "Rental Tickets", which can be spent to play a few matches using a character that has not yet been unlocked. "Battle Style Tickets", known as "Character Tickets" before January 2026, can be spent to unlock certain characters that were previously gacha-exclusive; older characters are gradually made available via this method as newer characters are added to the game. Each character's voice actor reprises their role from the anime series in both Japanese and English.

Unlocked by default	Unlocked via Special License	Unlocked via gacha or Battle Style Tickets
Izuku Midoriya; Ochaco Uraraka; Cementoss; Mt. Lady; Tomura Shigaraki; Dabi	Katsuki Bakugo; Shoto Todoroki; Tsuyu Asui; Mr. Compress; Himiko Toga; All Might	All For One ^{S4}; All For One (Youth) (Note: A separate version of the character based on the final arc of the series.) ^{S13}; Armored All Might ^{S14}; Denki Kaminari; Eijiro Kirishima; Endeavor ^{S2}; Fumikage Tokoyami ^{S15}; Gentle Criminal ^{S18}; Hawks ^{S7}; Hitoshi Shinso ^{S10}; Ibara Shiozaki; Itsuka Kendo; Izuku Midoriya (OFA) ^{S13}; Kurogiri ^{S9}; Lady Nagant ^{S14}; Mirio Togata ^{S5}; Mirko ^{S17}; Momo Yaoyorozu; Neito Monoma ^{S11}; Nejire Hado ^{S8}; Overhaul ^{S6}; Shōta Aizawa; Shoto Todoroki (Phosphor) ^{S19}; Star and Stripe ^{S16}; Tamaki Amajiki ^{S12}; Tenya Ida; Toya Todoroki ^{S19}; Twice

^S2 Added in Season 2
^S4 Added in Season 4
^S5 Added in Season 5
^S6 Added in Season 6
^S7 Added in Season 7
^S8 Added in Season 8
^S9 Added in Season 9
^S10 Added in Season 10
^S11 Added in Season 11
^S12 Added in Season 12
^S13 Added in Season 13
^S14 Added in Season 14
^S15 Added in Season 15
^S16 Added in Season 16
^S17 Added in Season 17
^S18 Added in Season 18
^S19 Added in Season 19

== Development and release ==
Ultra Rumble was announced in Weekly Shōnen Jump on January 13, 2022. Byking, who previously developed My Hero One's Justice (2018) and My Hero One's Justice 2 (2020), returned as the developer. In an interview with Anime News Network, producer Aoba Miyazaki explained that the developers hoped to provide a unique experience within the battle royale game genre through the use of the My Hero Academia characters' different fighting styles.

Two closed beta tests were held prior to release; from February 2 to February 6, 2022, and from August 17 to August 21, 2022, followed by an open beta from May 25 to June 1, 2023. The full game was released by Bandai Namco Entertainment on September 28, 2023, for Nintendo Switch, PlayStation 4, Windows, and Xbox One. Post-launch content has been released in seasons every two months, including new characters, modes, gameplay mechanics, stages, and cosmetics.

A separate mobile version, titled My Hero Ultra Rumble Mobile, (Note: Known in Japan as My Hero Academia: Ultra Rumble Mobile, (僕のヒーローアカデミア ULTRA RUMBLE(ウルトラ ランブル) モバイル, Boku no Hīrō Akademia Urutora Ranburu Mobairu)) was announced in Weekly Shōnen Jump on November 5, 2026. It is planned to have shorter matches and no cross-platform play with the other versions. It is in development for Android and iOS, with no release date currently announced.

== Reception ==
In a preview of the closed beta version, Josh Tolentino of Siliconera called Ultra Rumble "rough and unbalanced", but said it had "a lot of potential". Scott Adams of The Outerhaven enjoyed the closed beta while noting balance issues. Stef Watson of Couch Soup found the open beta enjoyable despite not being able to get into other battle royale games.

Upon release, James Birks of TheXboxHub gave the game 4/5 stars, praising its map design, matchmaking, and spectacle, while criticizing the small villain roster and lack of mode variety at launch.

Ultra Rumble was downloaded seven million times in its first month. It surpassed ten million downloads by February 8, 2024.
