= Ochaco Uraraka =

Superhero from My Hero Academia

- My Hero Academia character
- Ochaco as pictured from the cover of My Hero Academia, Volume 26. Art by Kōhei Horikoshi.
- First appearance: My Hero Academia #3, "Entrance Exam", 21 July 2014
- Created by: Kōhei Horikoshi
- Portrayed by: Yume Takeuchi
- Voiced by: Japanese: Ayane Sakura; English: Luci Christian

In-universe information
- Alias: Uravity
- Gender: Female
- Occupation: Student; Superhero
- Affiliation: Ryukyu Agency (formerly)
- Family: Unnamed parents
- Significant other: Izuku Midoriya
- Nationality: Japanese

Ochaco Uraraka, (Note: Known in Japanese as 麗日お茶子 (Uraraka Ochako). In the Viz Media English translation of the My Hero Academia manga, her given name is spelt Ochako.) also known as Uravity, (Note: ウラビティ (Urabiti)) is a superhero who is one of the main characters of the manga series My Hero Academia, created by Kōhei Horikoshi. Her first appearance is in the third chapter of My Hero Academia, "Entrance Exam". She serves as one of the closest friends and mutual love interest of series protagonist Izuku Midoriya.

In My Hero Academia, most characters have superpowers called quirks; Ochaco can nullify the effects of gravity and make any object weightless. Overuse of her quirk causes her to suffer from nausea. Born into a poor household, she aspires to become a hero to financially support her parents, becoming a student at U.A. High School for Heroes in the same class as Izuku. Ochaco is depicted as a sincere, kind, bright, and determined student who endeavours to help her parents after having lived a difficult life in My Hero Academia.

Horikoshi originally planned to have a character who could change her size, Yu Takeyama or Mount Lady, to fill the role that became Ochaco's. Because Horikoshi did not know how the ability to change size would work in a main character, he had the character who would become Ochaco have a different quirk, and he made his original character a professional hero in the series, rather than a student. Ochaco is voiced by Ayane Sakura in Japanese and Luci Christian in English. Her character has received praise for her character arc and personality. Critics particularly noted her kindness, relationships with others, and significance to the plot. She placed high in several popularity polls within the My Hero Academia fandom. Different kinds of merchandise featuring Ochaco, such as model figures, keychains, clothing, and cosplay pieces, have been made available. In addition to My Hero Academia, she appears in numerous spin-off series, video games, and different crossover promotions.

== Concept and creation ==
For the manga series My Hero Academia, author and illustrator Kōhei Horikoshi created a fictional universe where most characters have superpowers called quirks. Originally, he intended to create another character, Yu Takeyama, or Mount Lady, as the main heroine. Because Mount Lady's superpower allows her to change her size, he thought having this power would be problematic. Mount Lady was then portrayed as a professional hero in the series. Horikoshi created a character having a different quirk, who became Ochaco Uraraka, instead. An editor noted in the English translation of the first volume of My Hero Academia her name means "Tea-Girl Pretty-Day" and conveys beauty.

In My Hero Academia: Ultra Archive – The Official Character Guide, Horikoshi's book on the characters in My Hero Academia, he remarked that he aimed to draw a brawny girl with thick hips, feet, and waist, and he favoured drawing a girl who appeared robust and solid. Yoshihiko Umakoshi, the series's character designer and animation director who had an interview with Horikoshi in the book, remarked it was the most attractive feature of Ochaco and he thought she would be thinner. Horikoshi responded that if he had made her thinner, he would have been amazed by the sex appeal. Umakoshi expressed his amazement at his colleagues' reactions to Horikoshi's drawings, but Horikoshi was thankful for them.

=== Voice actresses ===
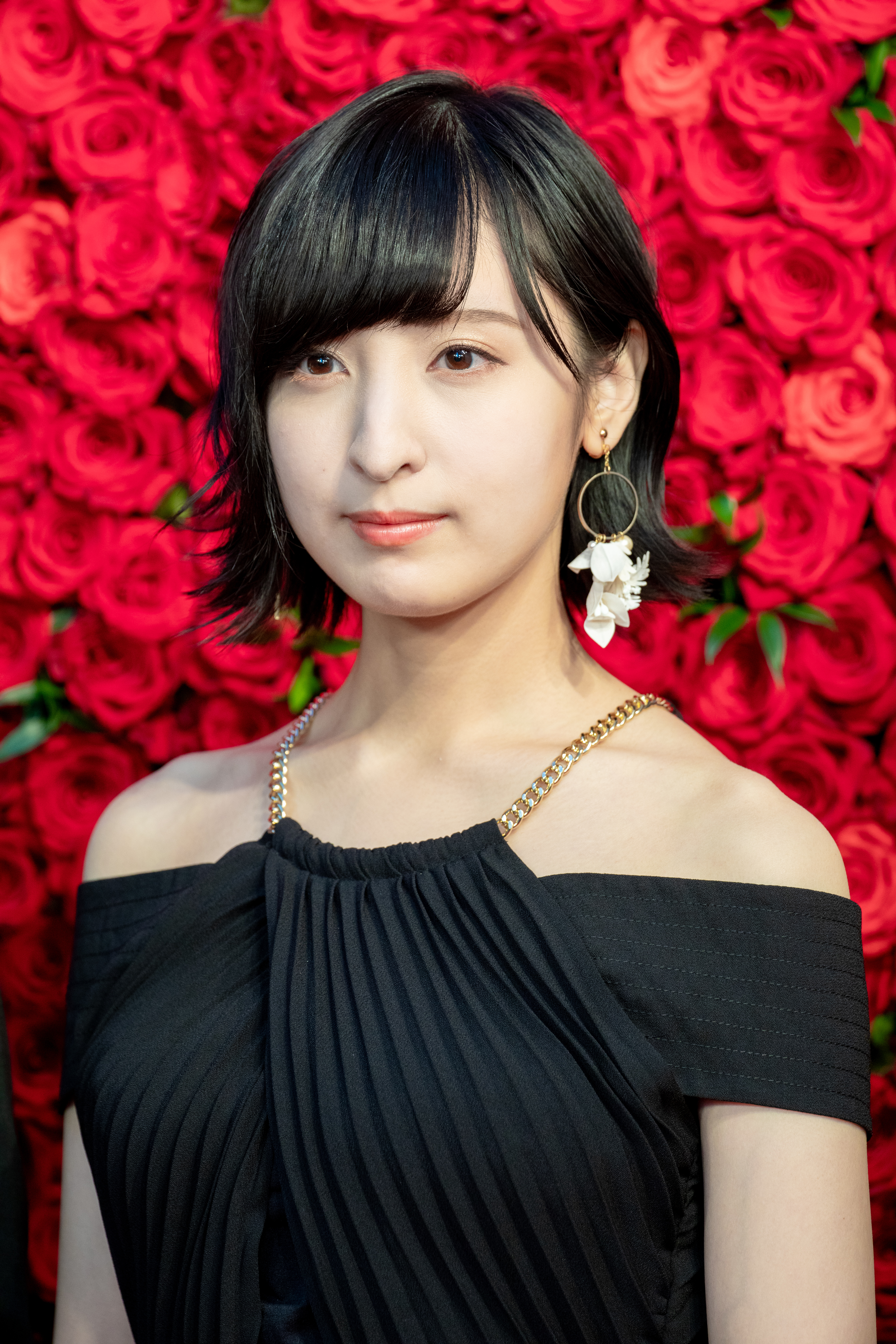
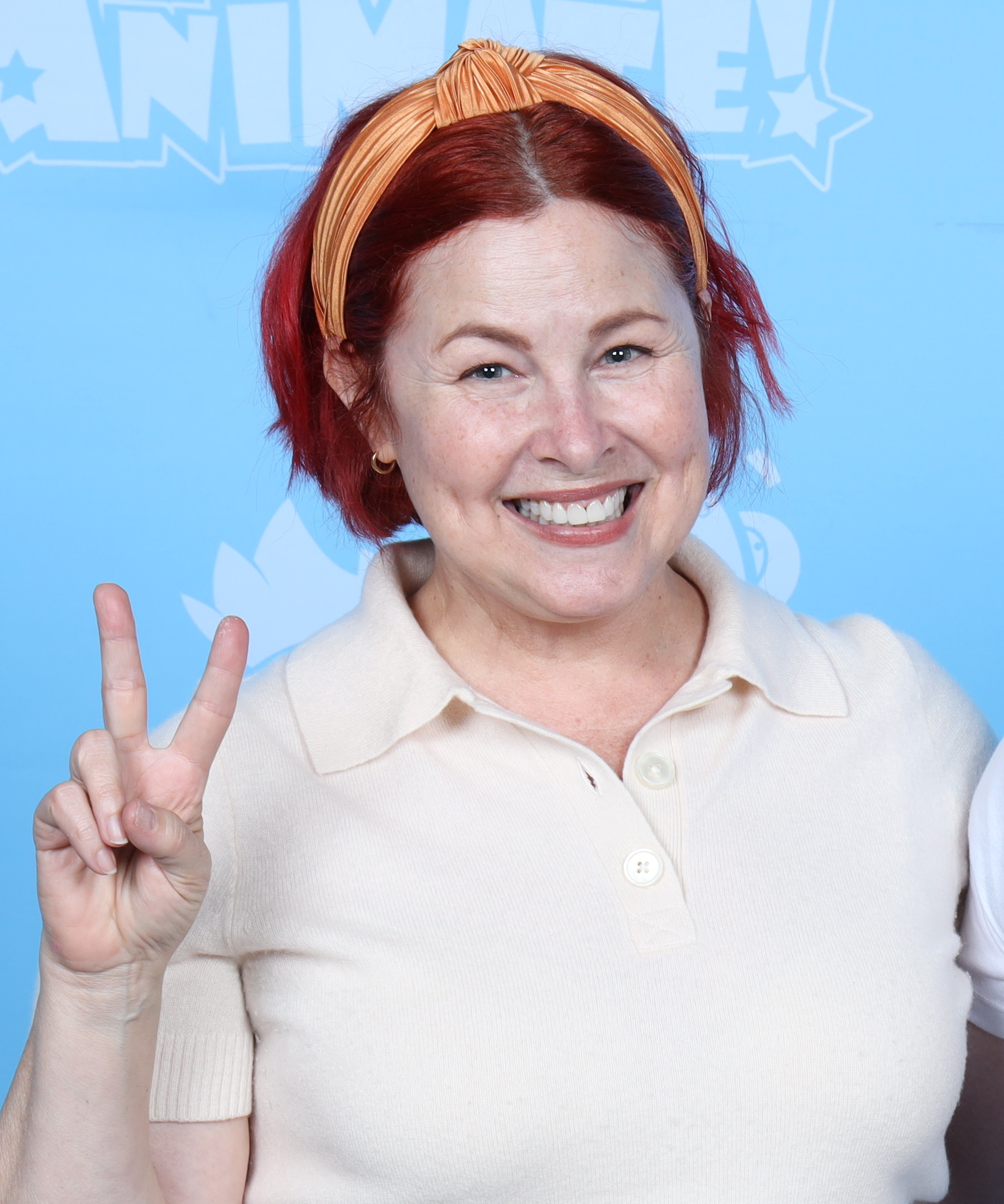
Ayane Sakura (left) and Luci Christian (right) voiced Ochaco in the original Japanese version and English dub, respectively.

Ochaco Uraraka is voiced by Ayane Sakura in the original Japanese version, and Luci Christian in the English dub. Sakura said she strongly desired to portray Ochaco. In another interview, Sakura thought Ochaco was a strong-willed character in the first season, and when Ochaco entered her school, UA High School, she was not experienced in actual combat. Sakura said as Ochaco grew, she could handle more things. Sakura thought part of Ochaco's nature did not change, but she wondered if Ochaco's behaviour showed her self-confidence based on her experiences. Sakura remarked that although she had been portraying Ochaco for more than six years, as tension built up in My Hero Academia, Ochaco grew from a character centred on fun school life to one where she had become increasingly wiser. At that point, she felt Ochaco, as a hero, eventually rescued other heroes. When Sakura was with Misato Fukuen, Himiko Toga's actress, Sakura said that, regarding their roles, it was difficult to ignore Himiko when she played Ochaco in the seventh season. Sakura cried when she was recording the 20th episode of the seventh season with Fukuen and said the image of Himiko had become deeply ingrained in her mind. She said she could not remember much because she could not see the script through her tears.

Luci Christian affirmed she had not read the manga, but she was surprised to learn Ochaco was strong. She said at the time of dubbing My Hero Academia, she did not know she would act based on having portrayed other anime characters. She was delighted in moulding the personalities and voices of the characters she portrayed. She asked questions about the characters she was portraying, and adjusted her performance based on what her director answered. She further said she already knew what Ochaco should sound like, such as in the speech she gives to plead for fellow student Izuku's return in the sixth season. She said she thinks deeply about the framework of the character's voice instead of the situation the character is in. She also remarked that being involved in the series changed her life as she reflected on the journey to voice her character. In a joint interview with Christian and Himiko's English actress Leah Clark, both actresses stated that they viewed Ochaco and Himiko as foils, with Ochaco being a cheerful popular girl while Himiko was a bullied reject who had to hide her desires. Clark stated that she did not know that Himiko would die until Christian accidentally revealed it to her. They reflected on a scene where Himiko interrogates Ochaco about whether the villains deserve to be killed, where Ochaco answers "yes" in the moment but eventually becomes the only hero who tries to understand Himiko.

=== Characterisation and themes ===
Ochaco is depicted as a sincere, kind, bright, and charming girl from Mie Prefecture, whose accent sometimes slips out and whose strong will shows in her fighting. According to My Hero Academia: Ultra Archive – The Official Character Guide, she is characterised as being honest and determined, and although she has average intelligence and below-average power and speed, her superior technique and cooperativeness compensate for these weaknesses. One time, she wanted to use her quirk to help her parents with their construction business, but they told her to pursue her own path. She is described as having lived a difficult life, but she plans to help her parents live more comfortable lives.

Ochaco, being the first friend of the protagonist Izuku Midoriya, a student who aspires to be a hero, understands him well, trusts him, and shares behaviours with him. She thinks about him and plans to enter an intimate relationship; so she becomes increasingly interested in him. Horikoshi revealed in chapter 394 that Ochaco loves Izuku.

== Appearances ==
=== In My Hero Academia ===
Ochaco first appears in "Entrance Exam", the third chapter of the manga, when going to take an entrance examination with Izuku Midoriya and other students of Class 1-A, the class she is in over the course of the series. She notices Izuku and is friendly towards him. She takes the examination with the other students and shows she can throw an object an infinite length. During the examination, when Izuku was falling, Ochaco touches him to save him from death. This shows her quirk, Zero Gravity, (Note: 無重力(ゼログラビティ) (Zero Gurabiti)) allows her to remove gravity from objects by touching these objects. She starts off with being able to remove gravity from anything up to three tonnes in weight, but overexerting herself by exceeding this weight limit will cause her nausea. Closing her fingers together cancels her quirk's effects.

Ochaco explains to Izuku and Tenya Ida, another fellow student, that she wants to earn money to support her poor parents. Then, she fights Katsuki in the UA Sports Festival, a major event watched throughout Japan which they trained hard for daily. Later, she trains under Gunhead, a professional hero, to strengthen herself, learn martial arts, and combine physical combat with her quirk. She fights alongside Yuga Aoyama against Thirteen in the final examination and wins because of her ability to think and internalise what she learnt from her internship.

Some time after, she works with fellow student Tsuyu Asui, professional hero Ryukyu, and professional hero Sea Rescue Hero Selkie to stop drug smugglers flying an aeroplane. Using her powers and tools, she enters the aeroplane and knocks the pilot out. Realising the drug could contaminate the ocean if the aeroplane crashes, she negates the aeroplane's weight and lands it with help from Ryukyu and fellow intern Nejire Hado.

Because of the antagonist All For One's actions in causing society to struggle and Tomura Shigaraki, another antagonist, looking for Izuku, civilians try to stay away from Izuku and not support him. To surpass All Might in power, Izuku needs support from civilians. Civilians panic and become angry about lawlessness running rampant in Japan, but Ochaco convinces them UA High School needs Izuku, and if he does not return, everyone will die.

Throughout My Hero Academia, Ochaco and antagonist Himiko Toga fight each other, but Ochaco ultimately wins and gets Himiko to change her ways. During her final fight with Himiko Toga, Ochaco awakens her quirk, but only after talking to Himiko Toga to attempt to understand her and getting stabbed by her. After awakening, or maximising the potential of Zero Gravity, Ochaco does not need to touch anyone or anything to cause them to float. She awakens her quirk when she encounters clones of Twice, another antagonist, and the floating Twice clones touch other characters and cause them to float. Himiko reveals to Ochaco how her life progressed. To prevent Ochaco from dying, Himiko gives her own blood to her before she dies.

Ochaco has trouble in class and struggles to hold back her tears as she leaves school. Izuku tells Ochaco she prioritises others over herself and she is a hero to him. Eight years after the events of the series, Ochaco becomes a professional hero and intends to offer quirk counselling. Because of how she feels about Himiko's rejection from societal norms and her consequent death, she wants to ensure something similar does not happen again. Her long-time crush on Izuku is further realised when he confesses to her that he wants to spend more time with her than anyone else, convincing her to confess that she has the same feelings for him, encouraged by Toga's spirit.

Ochaco appears in the films My Hero Academia: Two Heroes, My Hero Academia: Heroes Rising, My Hero Academia: World Heroes' Mission, and My Hero Academia: You're Next. She, along with the rest of Class 1-A, fights alongside civilians David Shield and his daughter Melissa Shield in Two Heroes. She and the rest of Class 1-A go to Nabu Island to stop Nine, the antagonist, in Heroes Rising. She goes with Tsuyu, Nejire, and Ryukyu to France to apprehend criminals in World Heroes' Mission. In You're Next, she works with her class to rescue Miss Anna, a civilian, and to stop Dark Might, the antagonist.

=== In other media ===
Ochaco appears in the spin-off light novel series My Hero Academia: School Briefs, My Hero Academia: Team-Up Missions, and the parody comic My Hero Academia: Smash!!, which depicts My Hero Academia's events in a more comedic manner. In My Hero Academia: Ultra Archive – The Official Character Guide, she appears in an omake, or a bonus section at the end of the book, with Katsuki Bakugo, set during a final examination in chapter 68, where they talk about Izuku Midoriya. She is a playable character in the video games My Hero Academia: Battle for All, My Hero One's Justice, My Hero One's Justice 2, My Hero Ultra Rumble, My Hero Academia: Smash Rising, and My Hero Academia: All's Justice.

In a crossover promotion with Avengers: Infinity War, Ochaco shares a brief conversation with Black Widow. She appears alongside Izuku, Katsuki, and All Might in Fortnite, as crossover characters. Ochaco was a character skin option as Juno for crossover promotion in Overwatch 2, which became available from 17 to 30 October 2024.

Ochaco appears in the My Hero Academia Collectible Card Game, a part of the UniVersus Collectible Card Game. She has cards in the Girl Power booster set and JetBurn expansion, and she has her own deck.

In the stage play, Ochaco is portrayed by Yume Takeuchi. Takeuchi revelled in hearing she had the same height, blood type, and hair colour as Ochaco, and she enjoyed My Hero Academia. She described Ochaco as a character who persistently stands up despite getting dirty, is not two-faced, and continuously advances.

=== Merchandise ===
Merchandise featuring Ochaco includes model figures, toys, (Note: Toys include plush toys and building toys, such as those by Nanoblock.) accessories, (Note: Accessories include acrylic key holders, stickers, bags, rucksacks, wallets, clothing, and cosplay pieces.) and photographic bromides. She has been popular with cosplayers. BoxLunch and Crunchyroll had a collaboration where fans could photograph themselves with characters from My Hero Academia, including Ochaco. A collaboration café in Horikoshi's My Hero Academia Original Art Exhibition featured cold grated noodles, a parfait, and a peach drink centred on the character.

== Reception ==
=== Popularity ===
Ochaco has been popular amongst fans of the series. In a 2018 My Hero Academia character popularity poll by Crunchyroll, Ochaco ranked in fourth place with 3,268 votes. She placed third in Viz Media's first Weekly Shonen Jump popularity poll. She ranked fourth behind Izuku, Shoto Todoroki, and Katsuki in the first Japanese popularity poll with 652 votes. Anime! Anime! conducted popularity polls for characters with gravity manipulation abilities. Ochaco ranked as the second most popular character in 2022 and 2023, with 11 per cent of 1,212 voters and 6 per cent of 2,230 voters, respectively. In the same popularity polls, she placed third in 2024 with 14 per cent or 1,930 votes. In 2024, in the "World Best Hero" global poll, she was found to be the franchise's eleventh most popular character overall and the most popular female character. In an Internet poll taken by Mynavi News on 10 January 2025, Ochaco was found to be the most popular character Ayane Sakura portrayed, with 9.7 per cent of 500 Mynavi employees favouring Ochaco. She was nominated for Best Girl at the Crunchyroll's inaugural Anime Awards, and went on to win in the same category at the second edition in 2018. She was one of the five recipients for the "Best Girls of the Decade" category in the Funimation's Decade of Anime fan poll.

=== Critical response ===
Manga and anime-related publications have both praised and criticised Ochaco. Daniel Kurland of Den of Geek praised her character development and personality. A writer for Anime UK News praised the character for her kindness. Nick Valdez of ComicBook.com commended Ochaco's performance in the 14th episode of the sixth season and regarded her as a highly important character in that episode. Editors at Abema favoured Ochaco's appearance in the first episode of the second season, especially when she was a child. They wrote viewers appreciated Ochaco's appearance as a child and lauded her desire to help her parents from a young age in that episode. Himanshi Jeswani of FandomWire said Ochaco's powers were underutilised despite being important to the narrative, compared her to Marvel Comics' character Greg Willis, and criticised Horikoshi for not giving Ochaco or other female characters enough character development in My Hero Academia. She wrote that fans said Horikoshi disregarded his female characters despite their potential.

Sam Leach of Anime News Network and Alex Osborn of IGN commended her performance against Katsuki Bakugo and noted the importance of this event for her character growth. Editors at Abema highlighted Ochaco's and Himiko's final encounter and Himiko's death as being unsettling for viewers. Eric Himmelheber of Anime Corner praised Ayane Sakura's and Misato Fukuen's performances in the 20th episode of the seventh season, despite Sakura's attachment to Ochaco and her crying during the episode's recording session. Mario Taschler of Anime2You wrote that fans criticised Horikoshi's portrayal of female characters in My Hero Academia and that the confrontation between Ochaco and Himiko, although noteworthy, could be seen as childish. Tarun Kohli, also of FandomWire, noted Ochaco's and Himiko's conflict throughout the series was important. He stated that if Katsuki had fought Himiko instead, fans would have preferred having Katsuki as her opponent because of their destructive tendencies. Despite these tendencies, while Himiko chose to be evil, Katsuki chose to be good.

=== Analysis ===
Satomi Miyama analysed speech patterns of characters from shōnen manga such as My Hero Academia, Bleach, and One Piece. She found Ochaco's idiolect is generally gender-neutral, but slightly leaning towards masculine speech patterns, and Ochaco uses Japanese honorific speech less frequently than Izuku and Tenya Ida. The gender-neutral speech aligns with her sociability and frank demeanour. In another study, Yūko Uchida of Saitama University found Ochaco is less individualistic compared to Izuku. Derek McGrath found Ochaco has permanent blushes to show innocence. Maria-Teresa De Rosa Palmini, Laura Wagner, and Eva Cetinic of the University of Zurich found Ochaco was amongst the most common anime figures used in text-to-image models.
