= Izuku Midoriya =

Superhero from My Hero Academia

- My Hero Academia character
- Deku as pictured from the cover of My Hero Academia, Volume 13
- First appearance: My Hero Academia #1, "Izuku Midoriya: Origin", July 7, 2014
- Created by: Kōhei Horikoshi
- Portrayed by: Shin Tamura (musical)
- Voiced by: Japanese: Daiki Yamashita; Akeno Watanabe (young; anime); Yuna Taniguchi (young; vomic); English: Justin Briner; Lara Woodhull (young)

In-universe information
- Alias: Deku
- Occupation: Student; Teacher; Superhero
- Affiliation: Nighteye Agency (formerly); Endeavor Agency (formerly)
- Family: Inko Midoriya (mother); Hisashi Midoriya (father)
- Significant other: Ochaco Uraraka
- Nationality: Japanese
- Quirk: One For All (formerly)

Izuku Midoriya (Japanese: 緑谷 出久, Hepburn: Midoriya Izuku), also known by his hero name Deku (Japanese: デク), is a superhero and the main protagonist of the manga series My Hero Academia, created by Kōhei Horikoshi. In the series, he is an ambitious first-year high schooler and the 9th (and current) holder of "One For All" (ワン・フォー・オール, Wan Fō Ōru), a superpower which combines six different individual superpowers, or "Quirks", together and creates powerful bursts of energy, and also has the unique ability to be passed off to other people.

Initially born without a "Quirk" to call his own, Izuku would still grow up with aspirations to become a superhero in his own right. In this universe, Quirks are what we would generally refer to as superpowers or superhuman abilities. Mockingly nicknamed "Deku" by childhood classmate and former bully Katsuki Bakugo, Izuku would later save him from a villain, in turn winning over the interest of All Might, Izuku's childhood idol and #1 hero, who in turn passes down his Quirk, One For All, to him. After being accepted into U.A. High School, Izuku's classmate Ochaco Uraraka inspires him to embrace his nickname and he uses it as his hero name.

In the anime adaptation of the manga, Izuku is voiced by Daiki Yamashita in Japanese and Justin Briner in English. His character has received praise from critics for his development and personality. The voice performances in both Japanese and English dub also received praise. The character has also made consistent appearances in popularity polls related to the series, most commonly placing second.

== Creation and conception ==
Concept art of prototype character Mikumo Akatani.

Izuku Midoriya was initially created as Jack Midoriya (Japanese: 緑谷 ジャック, Hepburn: Midoriya Jakku), an ill salaryman working for a superhero supply company. This prototype appears only in a 2008 one-shot comic written by Horikoshi called My Hero. He was later changed to a high-school student for My Hero Academia (with the chronic illness repurposed for All Might's character), however, his character remains largely unchanged. This prototype for My Hero Academia's main protagonist was Mikumo Akatani (Japanese: 赤谷 海雲, Hepburn: Akatani Mikumo), a black-haired Quirkless boy who would have utilized gadgets to become a hero. Horikoshi revised the design of Akatani's character, as he was especially dissatisfied with the hair and shortened it for Midoriya. Initially the protagonist was to remain Quirkless. Horikoshi changed the direction of Midoriya's character by adding his acquisition of One For All, due to suggestions from editors that argued that a powerless main protagonist would be overshadowed by other superpowered characters.

=== Voice actors ===
Izuku's Japanese voice actor, Daiki Yamashita, commented on how he played differently during the time Izuku has changed. He said that while he played the character as the series progresses, he tried to gain a strength for himself as well. And when he acted against the villains, he tried to not back down but to convey the mental strength in his acting as well. Yamashita also stated that during voice recordings he had to eat a lot to prepare due to how often the character screams.

English voice actor Justin Briner originally auditioned for other characters, who are mostly in Class 1-A, the same class as Izuku. When he saw the character, he felt that this gave him strength as a voice actor. He also stated that he did not want to get his hopes up when he tried for the role. He described Izuku as "nerd" due to how relatable he is, and his sheer passion for heroism in the world that he lives in. Briner felt thankful that he lived for his character to voice throughout the series. He noted that voice acting had little nuances that he did not expect.

== Appearances ==
=== In My Hero Academia ===
Izuku is first seen in My Hero Academia as a 4-year-old boy about to be beaten up by three classmates, one of them being Katsuki Bakugo, who can create explosions. Unlike his parents and 80% of the world's population, Izuku is Quirkless, as in he was born without any unique superpower, or "Quirk", to call his own. Despite this setback, he grew up with aspirations to be a hero in his own right and began to idolize the superhero All Might. Izuku was raised primarily by his mother, Inko, who can make small objects float towards her. His father, Hisashi, whose Quirk allows him to breathe fire, is not seen because he is working abroad in the United States. Throughout his childhood and into his teen years, Izuku would often be bullied by Katsuki Bakugo, who would give him the nickname "Deku" (an alternate kun'yomi reading of his given name's kanji that is homophonous with 木偶, meaning "useless person; good for nothing"; treated as a clipped compound of "Defenseless Izuku" in English translations) to mock his perceived worthlessness in superhero society.

Ten years later, 14-year-old Izuku has a chance encounter with Toshinori Yagi, otherwise known as All Might, and asks him if he, too, could be a hero, even though he possesses no Quirk. All Might, after he reveals his true appearance, responds by telling him to dream more realistically and to consider becoming a police officer. Later, when an unnamed villain with mud-like liquid abilities attacks Katsuki, Izuku, without proper thought, runs up to try and save him, which in turn gives the worn-out All Might (who can only do hero work for about three hours a day due to a fight with All for One that destroyed half of his respiratory system) the motivation to finish off the villain.

Later, an impressed All Might meets up with Izuku and tells him that he wants him to inherit his Quirk "One for All". Izuku accepts the offer and, after ten months of training under All Might in order to prove his worth (in that time, Izuku turns 15), he is asked to eat a strand of All Might's hair to obtain One for All, just hours before the UA entrance exam. Izuku first uses One for All during the practical part of the exam to save Ochaco Uraraka from being attacked by a giant robot, causing him to pass the exam. In honor of his acceptance, his mother Inko fabricates him his very own super-suit, a teal-colored suit based on a sketch Izuku once drew. Izuku is placed in a class with Katsuki and Ochaco, the latter of whom inspires him to embrace "Deku" as his hero name due to sounding similar to "dekiru" (出来る), which roughly translates to "you can do it." He also became secretly infatuated with Ochaco, as he almost always blushes around her, and is the one girl he cares about the most; however, he keeps his feelings for her hidden out of fear of rejection, not knowing she also develops romantic feelings for him as well.

Throughout the course of the series, Izuku becomes an encouraging influence to his classmates, such as allowing class prodigy Shoto Todoroki to let go of traumas that prevented him from using his powers to its fullest potential, helping Ochaco Uraraka win the hero vs. villain exercise, teaching Fumikage Tokoyami how to use his Quirk for defense purposes during the cavalry battle at the Sports Festival, and helping Kyoka Jiro organize her notes for the school festival. After nearly a year of school activities and internships, some of which are intercepted by villain attacks, Izuku learns that All For One's apprentice Tomura Shigaraki has become powerful enough to steal One for All. Due to this, Izuku decides to leave U.A. so he can combat Shigaraki and his army of villains without endangering his classmates, who he had informed of his departure. Prior to leaving, he informs his classmates and several of the top heroes about One for All, the latter of whom assist him in hunting down the villains. His classmates tracked him down and were able to bring him back to U.A. successfully, while reminding him about how helpful he was to his class and why they see him as a friend even though he was born Quirkless, as well as Katsuki apologizing for his bullying attitude to Midoriya. This allowed Midoriya to finally stop running and was taken back to U.A. to recover.

During the final battle, Midoriya was able to beat Tomura Shigaraki but in the process loses his One for All rendering Midoriya Quirkless again. After graduating from U.A., Midoriya stayed at U.A. working as a teacher where he teaches new generations of heroes and becoming one of the most popular teachers. However, All Might provides a new battle suit based off One for All to Midoriya, allowing Midoriya to resume his hero duties, ranking him no. 4. He also confessed his feelings to Uraraka allowing the two to form a relationship.

=== In other media ===
Izuku plays central roles in the movies My Hero Academia: Two Heroes, My Hero Academia: Heroes Rising, My Hero Academia: World Heroes' Mission, and My Hero Academia: You're Next. He also appears in the spinoff light novel series My Hero Academia: School Briefs, and the comic parody My Hero Academia: Smash!!, which depicts My Hero Academia's events in a more comedic manner. He appears as a playable character in the video games My Hero Academia: Battle for All, My Hero One's Justice, My Hero One's Justice 2, My Hero Ultra Rumble, My Hero Academia: Smash Rising, and My Hero Academia: All's Justice.

In a crossover promotion with Avengers: Infinity War, Izuku shares a brief conversation with Captain America. He also appears as a playable character in the video game Jump Force along with All Might, Katsuki and Shoto. He also appeared in a Pixel Gun 3D set event, but is named "Quirky Boy", alongside two of his own weapons, the Double Quirk, and the Grenade Quirk.

Izuku appears alongside Katsuki, Ochaco, and All Might in Fortnite as crossover characters. He was also a character skin option as Tracer for crossover promotion in Overwatch 2, which became available from October 17 to 30, 2024. In May 2026, My Hero Academia collaborated with the popular mobile game Brawl Stars, where Midoriya, alongside Katsuki, All Might, Tomura, and Uraraka were all featured skins.

Shin Tamura portrayed Izuku in a My Hero Academia stage play.

== Powers and abilities ==
Izuku's Quirk, One For All, can stockpile one's power, increasing the user's physical capabilities and being transferred from one person to another. Since this Quirk can be passed down from user to user, the different Quirks of the previous One For All holders also become embedded into One For All as well. These powers are:

- Gearshift – The Quirk formerly held by the second user Toshitsugu Kudo. This allows the user to shift the speed of himself and anything he touches, ignoring inertia in the process.
- Fa Jin – The Quirk formerly held by the third user Bruce Lee. This enables the user to build up and store kinetic energy as they move, this energy can then be released as an explosive burst of speed and power.
- Danger Sense – The Quirk formerly held by Hikage Shinomori, the fourth user. This enables the user to detect nearby threats.
- Blackwhip – The quirk formerly held by Daigoro Banjo, the fifth user. This enables the user to use streams of black energy in order to grab objects and capture enemies.
- Smokescreen – The Quirk formerly held by En Tayutai, the sixth user. This enables the user to create thick clouds of smoke, hindering vision.
- Float – The Quirk formerly held by Nana Shimura, the seventh user. This enables the user to levitate.

=== Equipment ===
After transferring One For All from his body to defeat Shigaraki and AFO, Izuku's powers eventually disappear, rendering him quirkless once again and retires from heroism. 8 years later, Izuku receives from All Might a prototype powered suit that replicates his old quirks joint-funded by his classmates and All Might's old colleagues, which he uses to become a hero again.

== Reception ==
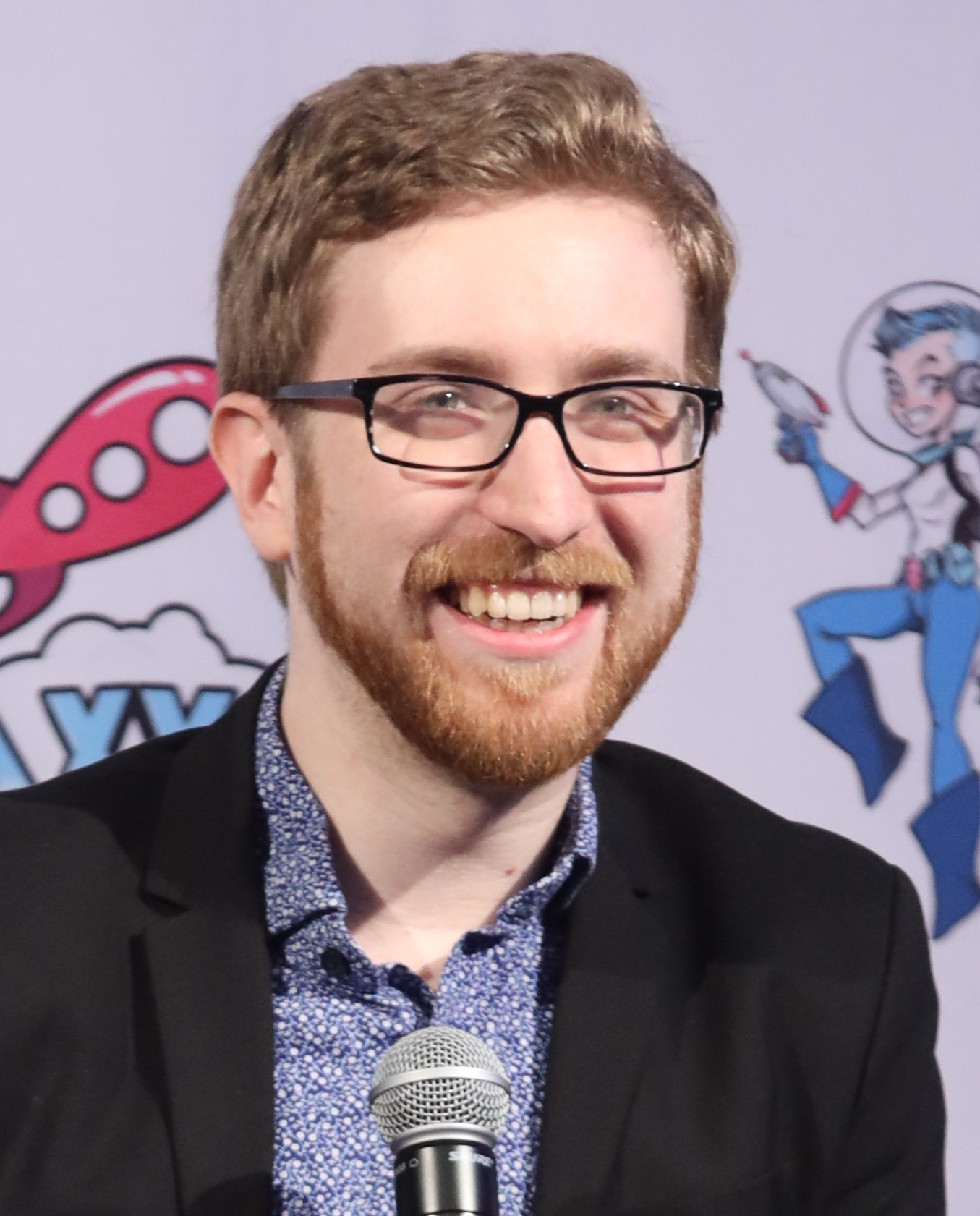
Justin Briner has received praise for his voice performance as Izuku.

=== Popularity ===
Izuku's character has been popular among the fans of the series. In a 2018 My Hero Academia character popularity poll by Crunchyroll, Izuku ranked in first place with 11,429 votes. He also placed first in the Viz Media's first Weekly Shonen Jump popularity poll. In the yearly Japanese My Hero Academia popularity polls, Izuku commonly ranks second place behind Katsuki Bakugo, although he has placed first in the first ever poll with 2,314 votes, and third in the fourth poll with 8,301 tallied votes. In Tumblr's top anime and manga characters, Izuku ranked first in 2019 and 2020; and second in 2021. He was one of the five recipients for the "Best Boys of the Decade" category in the Funimation's Decade of Anime fan poll. He ranked sixth in the Best Male Character category at the 42nd Anime Grand Prix in 2020. In the 6th BTVA Anime Dub Awards, Izuku's actor Justin Briner won the award for "Best Male Lead" in People's Choice category for his English dub. Anime! Anime! took popularity polls for the hero characters. Izuku ranked as the second most popular character from 2021 to 2023. In 2024, in the "World Best Hero" global poll, he was found to be the franchise's second most popular character overall behind Bakugo.

At the Crunchyroll Anime Awards, Izuku won "Hero of the Year" award while himself and his fight against Kacchan were nominated for "Best Boy" and "Best Fight Scene", respectively in 2017. In 2018, he won Best Hero while also being nominated for Best Boy. He went on to win the latter category in the following year; and in 2021, his fight against Overhaul won Best Fight Scene. In 2023, Mohja AlSheak was nominated in the "Best Voice Artist Performance (Arabic)" category for his performance as Izuku, but lost to Amal Hawija's Gon Freecss. In 2026, Izuku was nominated for "Best Main Character" and "Must Protect at All Costs" Character. Four of Izuku's international voice actors were nominated in the "Best Voice Artist Performance" category, namely Daiki Yamashita (Japanese), Justin Briner (English), Bastien Bourlé (French), and Simone Lupinacci (Italian); Bourlé eventually won while the other three lost to Aoi Yūki's Maomao, Lucien Dodge's Akaza, and Mosè Singh's Denji respectively.

=== Critical response ===
Izuku's character has received positive reviews from critics. Nick Creamer of Anime News Network called Izuku a "very likeable character" and noting that "he's joined by a rich cast of teachers and classmates who all add their own personality(...)." Isaac Akers of The Fandom Post found that Izuku is vital when it comes to his personality with the combination of earnestness, kindness, and naivety. He also said that the character was impossible to dislike, and his high-energy spirit meshes well with the excited pitch of the series itself. Daniel Kurland from Den of Geek praised the character as empathetic and his origins. He also liked the character's encounter with All Might which shows how this unconventional relationship that formed between them.

Critics also praised the voice performances of Izuku's character. Alex Osborn of IGN wrote that Japanese voice actor Daiki Yamashita is a "perfect fit" as a character, while the English voice actor Justin Briner described his performance as excellent and standout. Tom Speelman of Polygon said that both Yamashita and Briner's voice as Izuku "nail the optimistic nerdiness and heroic attitude" with Briner "channeling a bit of Morty Smith for good measure". Kurland also praised the English voice performance, adding that Briner felt "particularly comfortable" as a character and can rise to his challenge to avoid making a character annoying.

Michelle Smith from Soliloquy in Blue also liked Izuku and noting that "he spent a lot of time analyzing how they handled situations, and he's good at coming up with strategies", which makes him smart. She also said that "he possesses all the idealistic qualities that a good shounen hero should have. He's always out to help people, even if they don't ask for it." While discussing his frequent appearances on My Hero Academia popularity polls, Nerissa Rupnarine of Comic Book Resources wrote that Midoriya stands out on his own despite following some common shōnen tropes, adding that Izuku's character development "(...) is truly admirable and captivating to watch." In his review for the My Hero Academia: Heroes Rising movie, Teo Bugbee of The New York Times mentioned how Izuku's tenderness "[added] to the film's surprisingly emotional potency."

=== Awards and nominations ===
Year	Award	Category	Recipient	Result	Ref.
2017	1st Crunchyroll Anime Awards	Hero of the Year	Izuku "Deku" Midoriya	Won	
2017	1st Crunchyroll Anime Awards	Best Boy	Izuku "Deku" Midoriya	Nominated	
2017	1st Crunchyroll Anime Awards	Best Fight Scene	Deku vs. Kacchan	Nominated	
2018	2nd Crunchyroll Anime Awards	Best Hero	Izuku "Deku" Midoriya	Won	
2018	2nd Crunchyroll Anime Awards	Best Boy	Izuku "Deku" Midoriya	Nominated	
2018	6th BTVA Anime Dub Awards	Best Male Lead	Justin Briner as Izuku "Deku" Midoriya	Nominated	
2018	6th BTVA Anime Dub Awards	Best Male Lead - People's Choice	Justin Briner as Izuku "Deku" Midoriya	Won	
2019	3rd Crunchyroll Anime Awards	Best Boy	Izuku "Deku" Midoriya	Won	
2019	Funimation	Best Boys of the Decade	Izuku "Deku" Midoriya	Won	
2020	42nd Anime Grand Prix	Best Character (Male)	Izuku "Deku" Midoriya	6th place	
2021	5th Crunchyroll Anime Awards	Best Fight Scene	Deku vs. Overhaul	Won	
2023	7th Crunchyroll Anime Awards	Best Voice Artist Performance (Arabic)	Mohja AlSheak as Izuku "Deku" Midoriya	Nominated	
2026	10th Crunchyroll Anime Awards	Best Main Character	Izuku "Deku" Midoriya	Nominated	
2026	10th Crunchyroll Anime Awards	"Must Protect at All Costs Character	Izuku "Deku" Midoriya	Nominated	
2026	10th Crunchyroll Anime Awards	Best Voice Artist Performance (Japanese)	Daiki Yamashita as Izuku "Deku" Midoriya	Nominated	
2026	10th Crunchyroll Anime Awards	Best Voice Artist Performance (English)	Justin Briner as Izuku "Deku" Midoriya	Nominated	
2026	10th Crunchyroll Anime Awards	Best Voice Artist Performance (French)	Bastien Bourlé as Izuku "Deku" Midoriya	Won	
2026	10th Crunchyroll Anime Awards	Best Voice Artist Performance (Italian)	Simone Lupinacci as Izuku "Deku" Midoriya	Nominated	
