= My Hero Academia: Team-Up Missions =

Japanese manga series by Yōkō Akiyama

- Cover of the first manga volume

僕のヒーローアカデミア チームアップミッション (Boku no Hīrō Akademia Chīmu Appu Misshon)
- Genre: Superhero
- Created by: Kōhei Horikoshi
- Manga
- Written by: Yōkō Akiyama
- Published by: Shueisha
- English publisher: NA: Viz Media
- Imprint: Jump Comics
- Magazine: Jump GIGA (prologue); Saikyō Jump
- Original run: March 4, 2019 – January 4, 2025
- Volumes: 8
- icon

My Hero Academia: Team-Up Missions (Note: Japanese: 僕のヒーローアカデミア チームアップミッション, Hepburn: Boku no Hīrō Akademia Chīmu Appu Misshon) is a Japanese manga series written and illustrated by Yōkō Akiyama. It is a spin-off to Kōhei Horikoshi's manga series My Hero Academia. It was serialized in Shueisha's Saikyō Jump from July 2019 to January 2025, with its chapters, which are released on a monthly basis, additionally collected into eight tankōbon volumes.

== Premise ==
My Hero Academia: Team-Up Missions follows Izuku Midoriya and the rest of his classmates at U.A. High School as they are paired up with students from other hero schools and even Pro Heroes to participate in specially-requested missions as part of the "Team-Up Missions Program".

== Publication ==
Written and illustrated by Yōkō Akiyama, My Hero Academia: Team-Up Missions began serialization in Shueisha's Saikyō Jump on August 2, 2019, with a prologue chapter debuting in Jump GIGA on March 4, 2019. The final chapter was published in the magazine's February issue on January 4, 2025. Shueisha collected its chapters in eight individual tankōbon volumes, released from March 4, 2020, to May 2, 2025. A special one-shot manga was published in the magazine's next issue on December 4, 2025. In July 2020, Viz Media announced that My Hero Academia: Team-Up Missions would be licensed for the English-language release in North America.

=== Volumes ===
No.	Original release date	Original ISBN	English release date	English ISBN
1	March 4, 2020	978-4-08-882249-5	March 2, 2021	978-1-9747-2155-9
One-Shot: "Team-Up Missions: The Prequel" (チームアップミッション：前日譚, Chīmu Appu Misshon: Zenjitsutan); 1. "Team-Up Missions Begin" (始まれ新制度, Hajimare Nyū Misshon); 2. "The Quickest Undercover Hero" (潜入！最速のヒーロー, Sen'nyū! Saisoku no Hīrō); 3. "Two Who Support" (二人のサポーター, Futari no Sapōtā); One-Shot: "Who's Prince Charming?" (王子さまは誰！？, Ōji-sama wa dare!?); One-Shot: "The Heroes Are Here!" (ヒーローたちがやつてまた！, Hīrō-tachi ga Yatsute Mata!); One-Shot: "Everyone Is Someone's Hero" (きっと誰もが誰かのヒーロー, Kitto Daremoga Dareka no Hīrō)
2	April 2, 2021	978-4-08-882591-5	January 4, 2022	978-1-9747-2717-9
4. "Those Who Commune with the Abyss" (深淵の理解者, Shin'en no Rikai-sha); 5. "Hell's Kitchen" (地獄の修業, Jigoku no Shūgyō); 6. "Just Do Your Best, Ojiro!" (いいぞガンバレ 尾白くん！, Ī zo ganbare Ojiro-kun!); 7. "Might and Mic's 'Put Your Hands Up' Radio" (マイトとマイクのぷちゃへんざレディオ, Maito to Maiku no puchahenza Redio); 8. "Class A vs. Monoma" (A組VS物間くん, Ē-gumi bāsasu Monoma-kun); 9. "Use Illusions Responsibly, 'Kay?" (幻覚濫用ダメ、絶対！, Genkaku ran'yō dame, zettai!); One-Shot: "Deku and Bakugo Rising, Part 1" (出久&爆轟:ライジング 前編, Deku & Bakugo: Raijingu zenpen); One-Shot: "Deku and Bakugo Rising, Part 2" (出久&爆豪:ライジング 後編, Deku & Bakugo: Raijingu kōhen)
3	February 4, 2022	978-4-08-882875-6	March 14, 2023	978-1-9747-3475-7
10. "Every Mineta Has Its Day" (峰田くんのモテ期, Mineta-kun no Moteki); 11. "Guardian Deity of the Green Valley" (緑の谷の守り神, Midori no Tani no Mamorigami); 12. "Shinso's Errand" (心操くんのおつかい, Shinsō-kun no Otsukai); 13. "High-Calorie Girls" (ハイカロリー・ガールズ, Haikarorī Gāruzu); 14. "Shuffle It Up, Class A!" (シャッフれ！1-A, Shaffure! 1-A); 15. "The Wild Way of the Beast" (ワイルドの道はケモノ道, Wairudo no Michi wa Kemono Michi); 16. "The Soul Clan Visits Japan" (ソウル一家の日本旅行, Sōru Ikka no Nihon Ryokō)
4	October 4, 2022	978-4-08-883262-3	November 7, 2023	978-1-9747-4127-4
17. "We All Scream... for Fright Night" (叫べ…肝試シ, Sakebe... Kimodameshi); 18. "Beyond the K-Point!" (K点を超えろ！, Kē-ten o Koero!); 19. "Happy Apple Day"; 20. "Creators' File" (クリエイターズ・ファイル, Kurieitāzu Fairu); 21. "Dodge Day"; 22. "Hawks's Private Space" (HAWKS' PRIVATE ROOM); 23. "Ida's Manners" (飯田の作法, Īda no Sahō)
5	June 2, 2023	978-4-08-883626-3	August 13, 2024	978-1-9747-4563-0
24. "Isle Twixt Dream and Reality" (夢現の島, Yumeutsusu no Shima); 25. "U.A.'s Grand Cleanup" (雄英大掃除, Yūei Ōsōji); 26. "Prospective Students Day at U.A." (雄英体験入学, Yūei Taiken Nyūgaku); 27. "Surreal Heroism" (シュールヒロイズム, Shūruhiroizumu); 28. "Oshi no Kinoko, Shroom!" (オシノキノコノコ, Oshinokinokonoko); 29. "Mochi-Pounding Rush" (MOCHITSUKI RUSH); 30. "Time Off Well Spent" (良き余暇, Yoki Yoka); 31. "Tight Reform and Unique Fashion" (タイトな矯正とユニークな衣服, Taito na Kyōsei to Yunīku Ifuku)
6	April 4, 2024	978-4-08-883828-1	March 4, 2025	978-1-9747-5278-2
32. "Katsuma and The Trap Mansion's Secret" (活真とカラクリ屋敷の秘密, Katsuma to Karakuri Yashiki no Himitsu); 33. "Trash Rush" (トラッシュ・ラッシュ, Torasshu Rasshu); 34. "Tree Frog at the Bottom of the Well" (井の中の青蛙, I no Naka no Aogaeru); 35. "Going My Yayyy" (ゴーイング・ マイウェイ, Gōingu Mai Uei); 36. "Camie's Totes for Real Training" (ケミィのマジ特訓, Kemī no Maji Tokkun); 37. "Lovesickness" (恋の煩い, Koi no Wazurai); 38. "Fukidashi's Passion Project!" (熱筆! 吹出くん, Neppitsu! Fukidashi-kun); 39. "Fat Gum's Quest for Fat" (ファットガムは太りたい, Fattogamu wa Futoritai)
7	December 4, 2024	978-4-08-884299-8	December 2, 2025	978-1-9747-5814-2
40. "Gentle in Jail" (ジェントル・イン・ザ・ジェイル, Jentoru in za Jeiru); 41. "Nejire in Wondertown" (不思議の街のネジレちゃん, Fushigi no Machi no Nejire-chan); 42. "Tiger's Boot Camp Plus" (虎の我ーズブートキャンプ+, Tora no Warēzu Būtokyanpu+); 43. "The Wondrous Tale of Momoyao's Education on Sales" (ヤオモモセール開知奇譚, Yaomomo Sēru Kaichi Kitan); 44. "Phantom Thief"; 45. "Aquarium" (アクアリウム, Akariumu); 46. "The Perfect Shot" (最高の一枚, Saikō no Ichimai); One-Shot: "Endeavor's Mission" (エンデヴァーズ ミッション, Endevāzu Misshon)
8	May 2, 2025	978-4-08-884458-9	July 7, 2026	978-1-9747-6578-2
47. "Great Teacher All Might" (GTA, Gurēto Tīchā Ōru Maito); 48. "U.A.'s Textile Arts Club" (雄英手芸同好会, Yūei Shugei Dōkō-kai); 49. "Pinky's Dance" (ピンキーダンス, Pinkī Dansu); 50. "Look for the Unknown" (Look for UNKNOWN); 51. "Together in the Fight" (共闘, Kyōtō); 52. "Team-Up Mission Heroes, Assemble!" (集え!チームアップミッション, Tsudoe! Chīmu Appu Misshon); One-Shot: "Connect to the Day" (コネクトトゥザデイ, Konekuto Tu Za Dei)

== Reception ==
In a review of the first volume, Alex Lukas of Comic Book Resources stated that My Hero Academia: Team-Up Missions "is a decent popcorn read, [but] fails to be a fresh take on the young heroes of U.A. High School", although he commented the premise has "undeniable" potential.
