= My Hero Academia =

Japanese manga series by Kōhei Horikoshi

- First tankōbon volume cover, featuring Izuku Midoriya (front), All Might (back), and several other Pro Heroes (background)

僕のヒーローアカデミア (Boku no Hīrō Akademia)
- Genre: Adventure; Science fantasy; Superhero
- Manga
- Written by: Kōhei Horikoshi
- Published by: Shueisha
- English publisher: NA: Viz Media
- Imprint: Jump Comics
- Magazine: Weekly Shōnen Jump
- English magazine: NA: Weekly Shonen Jump
- Original run: July 7, 2014 – August 5, 2024
- Volumes: 42
- Anime television series
- My Hero Academia (2016–2025)
- Manga spin-offs
- Smash!! (2015–2017); Vigilantes (2016–2022); Team-Up Missions (2019–2025)
- Anime films
- Two Heroes (2018); Heroes Rising (2019); World Heroes' Mission (2021); You're Next (2024)
- Video games
- Battle for All (2016); One's Justice (2018); One's Justice 2 (2020); Ultra Rumble (2023); All's Justice (2026)
- icon

My Hero Academia (Japanese: 僕のヒーローアカデミア, Hepburn: Boku no Hīrō Akademia) is a Japanese manga series written and illustrated by Kōhei Horikoshi. It was serialized in Shueisha's shōnen manga magazine Weekly Shōnen Jump from July 2014 to August 2024, with its chapters collected in 42 tankōbon volumes. Set in a world where superpowers (called "Quirks") have become commonplace, the story follows Izuku Midoriya, a boy who was born without a Quirk but still dreams of becoming a superhero himself. He is scouted by the world's greatest hero, All Might, who bestows his Quirk to Midoriya after recognizing his potential, and helps to enroll him in a prestigious high school for superheroes in training.

The manga spawned a media franchise, leading to numerous spin-off manga, such as My Hero Academia: Smash!!, My Hero Academia: Vigilantes, and My Hero Academia: Team-Up Missions. The series has also been expanded into light novels, stage plays, and various types of merchandise and media, including numerous video games. It has been adapted into an anime television series produced by Bones, which aired for eight seasons from April 2016 to December 2025. It has also spawned four animated films, subtitled Two Heroes, Heroes Rising, World Heroes' Mission, and You're Next, as well as eleven original video animations (OVAs) and a television special that adapts a bonus chapter from the final volume of the manga. A live-action film by Legendary Entertainment is in development.

My Hero Academia became a commercial success and has appeared on The New York Times best-seller list several times. By April 2024, the manga had over 100 million copies in circulation, including sales of spin-offs, making it one of the best-selling manga series of all time. The series received praise for its art, characters, storytelling, action scenes, and its pop culture references to Western superhero comics. It has won several awards, including the Sugoi Japan Award and Harvey Award for Best Manga, and is considered one of the best of the 2010s.

== Synopsis ==
=== Setting ===
My Hero Academia is set in a world where about 80% of the human population has gained superpowers called "Quirks" (個性, Kosei) as a result of recent human evolution. Quirks vary widely and have the possibility of being genetically inherited. Quirks range from being small in scale to being god-like abilities. Most Quirks have some drawback when using it, such as a usage limit or self-injury, or manifest as permanent physical mutations to a person's body. Quirks will generally manifest in an individual just after their toddler years. As Quirks became dominant among the population, and newer Quirks became more powerful, society melded around their existence and largely commodified around them.

Initially, many people were inspired by old comics to use their Quirks to deal with crime on their own were recognized as Vigilantes (ヴィジランテ, Vijirante). The Hero Public Safety Commission (ヒーロー公安委員会, Hīrō Kōan Iinkai) was later formed and enlisted vigilantes to deal with criminals who abuse their Quirks, commonly known as Villains, until the Commission became more organized and instead focused on recruiting Pro Heroes (プロヒーロー, Puro Hīrō), who cooperate with authorities in rescue operations and apprehending villains. Vigilantes still exist in the present, but are considered illegal despite the help they give.

Heroes work out of Hero Agencies, which serves as their base of operations and a means for them to operate a business. Heroes can either lead their organization with lower-level sidekicks, or work equally as a team. In addition, Heroes who excel in their duties gain celebrity status and are ranked in popularity via the Hero Billboard Charts, with higher ranking heroes receiving public appeal. Pro Heroes exist around the world, with the first reported Quirk being in China, and the United States being referred to as the birthplace of Heroes.

Pro Heroes begin their initial training in high school, of which U.A. High School in Shizuoka Prefecture, Japan, is considered one of the most prestigious. Hero Courses offer both regular schooling and Hero-specific courses such as combat and rescue operations, as well as how to meld their individual skills and overcome their drawbacks. Companies sponsor the students, mainly by designing and remodeling superhero suits and support gear for them, and Pro Heroes often scout students for internships with them. interns with a Provisional Hero License and graduates start off as sidekicks, but can go independent to form their own offices.

=== Plot ===
Izuku "Deku" Midoriya is a Quirkless boy who dreams of becoming a Hero by attending the Hero Course at U.A. High School, idolizing Japan's No. 1 Hero All Might. One day, Midoriya attempts to save Katsuki Bakugo, his childhood friend who bullies him for lacking powers, from a Sludge Villain. All Might, who was seriously injured years earlier, witnesses this and chooses Midoriya to inherit his Quirk "One For All", which grants the ability to stockpile raw power and pass it on to others. After nearly a year of physical training, Midoriya becomes the ninth holder of One For All and passes U.A.'s Entrance Exam by saving Ochaco Uraraka. Ochaco spins Midoriya's "Deku" nickname - originally an insult from Bakugo - into a positive definition, convincing Midoriya to choose "Deku" as his hero name. Deku, Bakugo, and Ochaco are among the twenty students placed in Class 1-A, taught by Shota Aizawa, and All Might joins the U.A. faculty. During one of their classes, Class 1-A and All Might are attacked by the League of Villains led by Tomura Shigaraki and his caretaker Kurogiri.

During a televised Sports Festival, Deku helps his classmate Shoto Todoroki move on from his resentment of his father – the No. 2 Hero Endeavor – for abusing him and his family in pursuit of the No. 1 spot. After Bakugo wins the Sports Festival, the U.A. students go on their Hero Agency internships; Deku trains under All Might's teacher Gran Torino to stop hurting his body when using One For All. Class 1-A's Representative Tenya Ida tries to get revenge against Stain, a villain who believes All Might is the only true Hero while the rest are fake, for crippling his older brother. Deku and Shoto help Ida defeat Stain, but Stain's ideology spreads. Shigaraki takes advantage of a failed partnership with Stain to recruit several of his believers, including Himiko Toga, Dabi, and Twice. All Might learns that Shigaraki is the apprentice of All For One, an ancient villain whose Quirk allows him to steal and transfer other Quirks, who wounded All Might and killed the seventh One For All user Nana Shimura, Shigaraki's grandmother.

Class 1-A finishes their final exams of fighting their teachers - during which Ochaco develops feelings for Deku - and continues their training at a summer training camp with Class 1-B. Both classes are ambushed by the League's recruits, who kidnap Bakugo in the hopes of recruiting him. All Might leads several Pro Heroes in locating the League's hideout, where All For One reveals himself and helps the villains escape before battling All Might. Bakugo refuses to join the villains and is rescued by Deku, Shoto, Ida, Eijiro Kirishima, and Momo Yaoyorozu. All Might defeats All For One and imprisons him, but exhausts the last of his embers of One For All and retires. Suspecting a traitor, U.A. moves the students into dorms. Class 1-A partakes in their Provisional Hero License Exam, which is infiltrated by Toga in disguise; Shoto and Bakugo fail, later taking remedial courses as a make-up. Bakugo, blaming himself for All Might's retirement, deduces the transferrable nature of One For All, but Deku and All Might convince him to keep it secret.

U.A.'s top three third years, The Big Three select Deku, Kirishima, and a pair of Ochaco and Tsuyu Asui to join them as interns; Mirio Togata, who chose Deku, is interning under All Might's former sidekick Sir Nighteye. Both Nighteye's team and the League come into conflict with the Shie Hassaikai, a yakuza group who are experimenting on their boss' granddaughter Eri to produce Quirk-Destroying Drugs. Nighteye's team leads the Big Three's agencies and Aizawa in a raid on the Shie Hassaikai's base to save Eri, during which Nighteye is killed, Mirio is de-powered, and the remaining drugs are stolen by the League. Eri is adopted by the U.A. staff, and she trains her "Rewind" Quirk to eventually restore Mirio's Quirk; Class 1-A performs a rock concert at a school culture festival to help her overcome her trauma. The Hero rankings are updated, including a top 5 consisting sequentially of Endeavor, Hawks, Best Jeanist, Edgeshot, and Mirko. Endeavor, humbled by his No. 1 ranking, tries to make amends with his family. Hawks spies on the League, gaining their trust by seemingly killing Best Jeanist.

During a battle exercise of Class 1-A versus 1-B, Deku awakens One For All mid-fight against Neito Monoma, gaining the ability to communicate with the vestiges of the previous users of One For All and slowly acquire all of their Quirks. The League battles another villain group, the Meta Liberation Army; Twice, Toga, and Shigaraki awaken their Quirks, leading to the two groups merging to become the Paranormal Liberation Front. Shigaraki regains his memories of accidentally killing his family during the manifestation of his Quirk "Decay", and undergoes a procedure to obtain All For One's Quirk. Gran Torino arrests Kurogiri, discovering him to be Aizawa's deceased school friend resurrected and modified by All For One; Kurogiri reveals the location of the villains' new base. Internships resume in anticipation for a war; Deku and Bakugo join Shoto to intern under Endeavor, where they learn about Shoto's late eldest brother Toya.

The war starts just as the students finish their first year, with hundreds of villains arrested but dozens of Heroes killed. Hawks reluctantly kills Twice. Mirko interrupts Shigaraki's procedure, but he awakes and goes on a massive destruction spree. Ochaco and Deku become sympathetic when Toga interrogates Ochaco about whether villains deserve death and Deku sees Shigaraki possessed by All For One's vestige. Dabi reveals his identity as Toya Todoroki, and destroys public trust in Heroes by broadcasting Endeavor's abusive past and Twice's death. Although Best Jeanist and Mirio both recover and arrive as reinforcements, a few Paranormal Liberation Front commanders escape and break thousands of villains out of prison, including All For One. Deku and All Might reveal the truth about One For All and leave U.A. to hunt the escapees with Japan's top Heroes. This leads Deku to physical and emotional ruin, so Class 1-A intervenes to bring him back to U.A., which is now a refugee camp. Bakugo apologizes for his bullying, and Ochaco pleads to refugees protesting Deku's return that Heroes need saving too.

After Deku recovers, Class 1-A's Yuga Aoyama is discovered to be the suspected traitor. Aoyama reconciles with his class and lures the villains into a trap for Monoma, copying Kurogiri's Quirk, to scatter them across Japan. Endeavor and Hawks lead one group against All For One, forcing him to use a modified Rewind drug that restores his youth but will eventually kill him. The remaining top 5 Heroes are stationed to fight Shigaraki at a fortified U.A. with Deku, Bakugo, the Big Three, and Monoma copying Aizawa's Quirk; however, Toga drags Deku away upon the initial scattering, and Shigaraki mortally wounds Bakugo. Shoto defeats Dabi, who later gets back up to unleash a suicidal attack against the refugees; a slowly dying Dabi is extinguished by the entire Todoroki family. Toga creates an army of Twice clones and stabs Ochaco, but the two come to an understanding and Toga dies saving Ochaco's life through a fatal blood transfusion. All For One attempts to reach Shigaraki to fuse, but is stalled by many Heroes, including All Might using a powered exoskeleton. Bakugo, who was revived by Edgeshot via cardiac surgery, kills All For One as he Rewinds out of existence.

Deku returns to fight Shigaraki; unable to defeat him physically, Deku forcibly transfers One For All to damage Shigaraki's soul. This brings Deku into Shigaraki's memories, where Deku comforts Shigaraki about his family's deaths. All For One's vestige reveals that he engineered Shigaraki's entire life, including by giving him Decay, allowing All For One to re-possess Shigaraki. Kurogiri brings Hero reinforcements, though he betrays the Heroes upon seeing Shigaraki harmed before Kurogiri is killed by Bakugo. The reinforcements assist Deku in destroying Shigaraki's body, while the vestiges of Shigaraki and the One For All users destroy All For One's vestige. Eight years after the war's conclusion, a once-again Quirkless Deku is a teacher at U.A., while his former classmates are Pro Heroes or Sidekicks. All Might gifts Deku a powered suit that replicates his old Quirks, funded by his former classmates, which he uses to return to hero work. One month later, Deku and Ochaco enter a relationship, and six months later Deku and Bakugo join Mirio and Shoto among the top 5 Heroes.

== Production ==
=== Development ===
Writer Kōhei Horikoshi stated that after his previous series Barrage was canceled after just two volumes, he was depressed and out of ideas. To formulate more ideas, he revisited a one-shot he previously published in Akamaru Jump, titled My Hero (僕のヒーロー, Boku no Hīrō). This would end up being the basis for My Hero Academia. Horikoshi was also an avid fan of American films and comics, such as Sam Raimi's Spider-Man trilogy, Star Wars, and X-Men, which he used for inspiration. Horikoshi cites Masashi Kishimoto's Naruto manga series as being the main influence for his art, specifically stating it gave him a love for drawing hands. Horikoshi has also cited Dragon Ball, Ultraman, and Kamen Rider as sources of inspiration. Additionally, Horikoshi noted that he is a fan of the kaiju franchises Gamera and Godzilla and has mentioned and made reference to them in several comments.

Hitoshi Koike, the editor of My Hero Academia, said that Horikoshi already had a general story in mind for the manga. However, he also noted there were many rejected story ideas, and that Horikoshi dismissed some ideas himself. Koike also stated that Horikoshi liked to use his inspirations. Koike additionally noted My Hero Academia's first three chapters took longer to complete than many other new serialized works. Koike and Horikoshi worked on character design concepts while finishing the storyboards; Koike felt excited about the characters' designs despite not knowing their role in the plot.

Kengo Monji, the second editor of the manga, said Horikoshi had a difficult time writing chapters at first. Monji felt that the manga was mixing the flair of Japan's shōnen manga with "heroes", a concept that he thought was understandable to a wide audience. Monji also complimented Horikoshi's artwork, noting its cartoon-style.

=== Conclusion ===
Horikoshi originally stated that My Hero Academia would not be as long as One Piece since he felt he did not have enough stamina; he instead preferred to keep it concise in comparison to other shōnen manga series. In April 2021, Horikoshi stated that the series had continued for longer than expected, but that it was still leading toward the ending that he had decided upon before the series began. In December 2021, he stated during an interview at Jump Festa '22 that "if things go smoothly, the manga will meet its goal to end in one year. If it doesn't go smoothly, I think [Izuku's voice actor] Yamashita will be reading out the exact same letter from me at next year's Jump Festa." He also teased that Katsuki Bakugo would soon get a "big scene". Horikoshi wrote in the 34th volume of the manga that "I feel like I can finally see the goal in sight. It's a rather strange feeling getting to this point. In the past, I would just be drawing without a single care [for the future], but now I wonder just how many more times can I draw these characters? Change is scary as you grow older. Well, I really shouldn't dwell on that! Until next volume then!" In October 2022, the author rescinded the statement he made during Jump Festa '22, opting to take longer to complete the manga's final arc than initially expected.

In December 2022, although Horikoshi stated that his estimations were wrong, he said that the ending of the manga is "very close". In December 2023, he reiterated on what he said in the previous year's event. However, he added that there were still many things he wanted to draw beyond the battle that was currently ongoing in the manga. The author also jokingly said that "if the series continues until next year's Jump Festa, we will hold a Dogeza Festival on the stage." In June 2024, Shueisha announced in the year's 27th issue of Weekly Shōnen Jump that the manga had entered its "epilogue" with the 424th chapter. Horikoshi stated in his comment that although the conclusion of a story is usually short, it is not the kind of manga to end immediately after defeating the villain, and so it will go on "a little longer," and he added that the manga would "return to its title." Later in the same month, it was announced that the series would end in five chapters after a ten-year run on August 5, 2024. The author expressed gratitude to his fans that made it possible for him to draw Deku and the others for the past ten years.

=== Themes and analysis ===
Horikoshi has stated that the main theme he focuses on is "what makes a hero". He also stated that he likes stories with bad endings, as well as horror stories. However, he finds these difficult to draw since the mood in his stories is based on his own current mood. To combat this, he adds in more silly-looking characters such as Fat Gum, in order to keep the mood up.

The series explores themes such as the nature of heroism, the importance of perseverance and determination, and the power of friendship and teamwork. Horikoshi said that he was inspired by the idea of creating a world where anyone, regardless of their background or abilities, could become a hero. He wanted to show that even those without powers could still make a difference and achieve their dreams through hard work and determination. That vision results in heroes in the series not being egotistical, but passionate and dedicated individuals with clear goals to work towards. The series also explores Izuku's idolization of heroes from a young age and his enthusiasm. In a world where superheroes are not just regulated, but commercialized brands, he still sees something inspiring in their actions.

My Hero Academia has been noted for its positive view of heroes. Creamer wrote that "in the modern world, we often challenge heroic ideals, and the motivations of the people who pursue them", noting how in American media, the optimism of the Silver Age of Comic Books lead to post-Watchmen ambiguity. He also noted that, even in Japan, unquestioned heroism is often challenged in modern revisions of older series, such as in Yatterman and Gatchaman.

== Media ==
=== Manga ===
Written and illustrated by Kōhei Horikoshi, My Hero Academia began its serialization in Shueisha's shōnen manga magazine Weekly Shōnen Jump on July 7, 2014. The series ended after a ten-year run on August 5, 2024. Its chapters were collected and published by Shueisha into 42 individual tankōbon volumes, released from November 4, 2014, to December 4, 2024; the final volume includes 38 pages of new content that take place after the original ending.

The series is licensed for English-language release in North America by Viz Media, which published the first volume on August 4, 2015. As the series was published in Japan, it was also released simultaneously in English digitally by Viz Media's Weekly Shonen Jump and later its website. Shueisha began to simulpublish the series in English on the website and Manga Plus app in January 2019.

==== Spin-offs ====
Three spin-off manga series have also been released. The first, My Hero Academia: Smash!! by Hirofumi Neda, is a comedy manga which ran in the Shōnen Jump+ digital app from November 9, 2015, to November 6, 2017. Its chapters were collected in five tankōbon volumes. The second spin-off manga, My Hero Academia: Vigilantes, is a prequel to the main series written by Hideyuki Furuhashi and illustrated by Betten Court, which ran from August 20, 2016, to May 28, 2022. Its chapters were collected in 15 tankōbon volumes. The third spin-off manga, My Hero Academia: Team-Up Missions by Yōkō Akiyama, features various side stories. It began serialization in Saikyō Jump on August 2, 2019, with a prologue chapter debuting in Jump GIGA on July 25, 2019; the series ended on January 4, 2025. The three spin-off manga were licensed for the English-language release in North America by Viz Media.

The four series' films have been adapted into one-volume manga series by Homesha. A 15-page one-shot spin-off manga, illustrated by Yōkō Akiyama, centered on Melissa, titled Everyone Is Surely Someone's Hero (きっと誰もが誰かのヒーロー, Kitto Daremo ga Dareka no Hero), was published in the 35th issue of Shueisha's Weekly Shōnen Jump on July 30, 2018. A one-shot spin-off manga that serves as a prequel to the first film, written and illustrated by Kōhei Horikoshi, centered on All Might's past and the featured character Nana Shimura, titled No. 0 All Might: Rising (No.0 オールマイト：ライジング, Nanbā 0 Ōru Maito: Raijingu), was given to the first one million attendees on August 3, 2018. A ten-page manga was included in the My Hero Academia Two Heroes Vol. 0 Origin (僕のヒーローアカデミア2人の英雄 Vol.0 Origin, Boku no Hīrō Akademia 2-ri no Eiyū Vol. 0 Origin) book. It was later published in English by Viz Media in September 2018.

Deku & Bakugo: Rising (出久&爆豪:ライジング, Deku Ando Bakugo: Raijingu), a two-chapter spin-off manga illustrated by Akiyama, was published in Shueisha's Weekly Shōnen Jump on December 16 and 23, 2019. It centered on Izuku Midoriya and Katsuki Bakugo during their second year in middle school. A one-shot spin-off manga that serves as a prequel to the second film, written and illustrated by Horikoshi, centered on Nine, titled League of Villains: Undercover (ヴィランれんごう:アンダーカバー, Viran Rengō: Andākabā), was also given to the first million attendees on December 20, 2019. A nine-page manga was included in the My Hero Academia Heroes: Rising Vol. R (僕のヒーローアカデミア ヒーローズ：ライジング Vol.R, Boku no Hīrō Akademia Hīrōzu: Raijingu Vol. R) book. It was later published in English by Viz Media in March 2020.

A 17-page special one-shot chapter written and illustrated by Akiyama, titled My Hero Academia Tokubetsu Spinoff: Endeavor's Mission (僕のヒーローアカデミア 特別スピンオフ エンデヴァーズ ミッション, Boku no Hīrō Akademia Tokubetsu Supin'ofu Endevāzu Misshon), was published in Weekly Shōnen Jump on August 2, 2021. It centered on Endeavor and his trainees Izuku, Katsuki, and Shoto during their Hero Work-Studies at the Endeavor Agency. An 80-page manga booklet, titled My Hero Academia World Heroes' Mission Vol. W (僕のヒーローアカデミア ワールドヒーローズミッション Vol. W, Boku no Hīrō Akademia Wārudo Hīrōzu Misshon Vol. W), includes a nine-page one-shot manga that serves as a prequel to the third film, centered on Endeavor Agency trainees and the featured character Hawks, titled No. XXX Hawks: Soothe (No.XXX ホークス:スーズ, Nanbā XXX Hōkusu: Sūzu) was given to the My Hero Academia: World Heroes' Mission attendees who viewed the film in Japan on August 6, 2021. The manga volume had a limited print run of one million copies. In October 2021, a 76-page booklet featuring a specialty manga was also given to the attendees who saw it on the opening weekend in the United States.

A 16-page one-shot spin-off chapter written and illustrated by Akiyama, titled Connect to the Day, was published in Weekly Shōnen Jump on July 29, 2024. It takes place before the Final War, centered on Class 1-A students during their mission to capture the Jailbreakers. An 80-page manga booklet, titled My Hero Academia Vol. Next (僕のヒーローアカデミア Vol. Next, Boku no Hīrō Akademia Vol. Nekusuto), includes a seven-page one-shot manga that serves as a prequel to the fourth film, centered on Class 1-A students, titled A Piece of Cake, was given to the My Hero Academia: You're Next attendees who viewed the film in Japan on August 2, 2024. The manga volume had a limited print run of 1.5 million copies. The manga chapter was later published in English by Viz Media in October 2024.

=== Anime ===
==== Television series ====
An anime television series adaptation of the manga was produced by Bones. It was directed by Kenji Nagasaki, written by Yōsuke Kuroda, and featured character designs by Yoshihiko Umakoshi. The series's first season aired from April 3 to June 26, 2016. A second season aired from April 1 to September 30, 2017. A third season aired from April 7 to September 29, 2018. A fourth season aired from October 12, 2019, to April 4, 2020. A fifth season aired from March 27 to September 25, 2021. A sixth season aired from October 1, 2022, to March 25, 2023. A seventh season aired from May 4 to October 12, 2024, with four "Memories" recap specials having aired in the preceding month of April. An eighth and final season aired from October 4 to December 13, 2025.

A bonus television special that adapts chapter 431, which was bundled with the 42nd and final volume of the manga, premiered on May 2, 2026.

==== Original video animations ====
An original video animation (OVA) was shown at Jump Festa '16 on November 27, 2016. Titled "Save! Rescue Training!", it was bundled with the limited edition of the 13th volume of the manga, which released on April 4, 2017. A second OVA, titled "Training of the Dead," bundled with a limited edition of the 14th volume of the manga, released on June 2, 2017. A third OVA, "All Might: Rising," was released on February 13, 2019. A two-part original net animation (ONA) titled "Make It! Do-or-Die Survival Training," was released on August 16, 2020. An OVA based on the bonus manga chapter "Departure" was included with the "Plus Ultra" edition of My Hero Academia: World Heroes' Mission in Japan. Two new OVAs, titled "HLB <Hero League Baseball>" and "Laugh! As If You Are in Hell," were given screenings in Japan from June 16–19, 2022.

A special OVA, titled "UA Heroes Battle," premiered with an English dub at the New York Comic Con on October 13, 2023. The episode was given screenings in Japan from October 20–26, 2023. An OVA based on the bonus manga chapter "A Piece of Cake" was included with the deluxe "Plus Ultra" edition of My Hero Academia: You're Next in Japan. An OVA short based on the one-shot manga chapter from the Ultra Age fanbook, titled "I Am a Hero Too," was publicly released on August 3, 2026. The OVA received screenings at Anime Expo on July 4, and be screened again at the "Character Match Up" event in Japan on August 1 and 2.

=== Light novels ===
A light novel series, titled My Hero Academia: School Briefs (僕のヒーローアカデミア 雄英白書, Boku no Hīrō Akademia: Yūei Hakusho), written by Anri Yoshi, was released by Shueisha under its Jump J-Books imprint. It centers on Izuku Midoriya and his classmates of U.A. High in everyday school lives. The first volume was released on April 4, 2016. As of October 4, 2021, six volumes have been published. In North America, it has been licensed in English by Viz Media.

Light novels based on the four anime films were released on August 3, 2018, December 20, 2019, August 6, 2021, and August 2, 2024, also written by Anri Yoshi.

=== Theatrical films ===
==== Anime ====
An animated film, titled My Hero Academia: Two Heroes, had its world premiere at Anime Expo in Los Angeles on July 5, 2018, before a Japanese theatrical release on August 3, 2018. A second film, titled My Hero Academia: Heroes Rising, released in Japan on December 20, 2019, with a North American release following on February 26, 2020. A third film, titled My Hero Academia: World Heroes' Mission, was released in Japan on August 6, 2021, and premiered in North America on October 29, 2021. A fourth film, titled My Hero Academia: You're Next, was released in Japan on August 2, 2024, and began screening in the United States on October 11, 2024.

==== Live action ====
In October 2018, Legendary Entertainment acquired the rights to produce a live action adaptation of the series. In August 2021, it was revealed to be directed by Shinsuke Sato, with Alex Garcia and Jay Ashenfelter overseeing the adaptation, and Ryosuke Yoritomi representing the manga publisher Shueisha. Toho is set to distribute the film in Japan. On December 12, 2022, Netflix announced that they had acquired the rights to the film with Joby Harold as screenwriter. In September 2025, it was announced that Jason Fuchs had been hired to rewrite the script and that Sato had been reaffirmed as director.

=== Video games ===
==== Console games ====
A video game based on the anime, My Hero Academia: Battle for All (僕のヒーローアカデミア バトル・フォー・オール, Boku no Hīrō Akademia: Batoru fō Ōru), was announced in November 2015. The game was developed by Dimps and published by Bandai Namco Entertainment for the Nintendo 3DS, where it released in Japan on May 19, 2016.

My Hero Academia has also received four video games developed by Byking and published by Bandai Namco Entertainment. The first, titled My Hero One's Justice (僕のヒーローアカデミア One's Justice(ワンズ ジャスティス), Boku no Hīrō Akademia: Wanzu Jasutisu), was released for PlayStation 4, Nintendo Switch, Windows, and Xbox One on October 26, 2018. The game has sold over 500,000 units worldwide by January 2019. A sequel, My Hero One's Justice 2 (僕のヒーローアカデミア One's Justice(ワンズ ジャスティス)2, Boku no Hīrō Akademia: Wanzu Jasutisu Tsū), was released on Nintendo Switch, PlayStation 4, Windows, and Xbox One on March 12, 2020, in Japan and worldwide in the following day. The third, a free-to-play battle royale action game, titled My Hero Ultra Rumble (僕のヒーローアカデミア ULTRA RUMBLE(ウルトラ ランブル), Boku no Hīrō Akademia: Urutora Ranburu), was released for Nintendo Switch, PlayStation 4, Windows and Xbox One on September 28, 2023. The fourth, a sequel to One's Justice 2 titled My Hero Academia: All's Justice, was released on PlayStation 5, Windows, and Xbox Series X/S on February 5, 2026, in Japan and worldwide in the following day.

==== Mobile games ====
Three mobile games have been released for iOS and Android. My Hero Academia: The Strongest Hero was released in North America and several other mostly English-speaking countries in late May 2021. My Hero Ultra Impact (僕のヒーローアカデミア ULTRA IMPACT(ウルトラ インパクト), Boku no Hīrō Akademia: Urutora Inpakuto) was released in February 2022. My Hero Academia: United Survival (僕のヒーローアカデミア UNITED SURVIVAL, Boku no Hīrō Akademia Yunaiteddo Sabaibaru) was released worldwide (excluding Mainland China) on August 6, 2026. A separate mobile version of the Ultra Rumble game, titled My Hero Ultra Rumble Mobile, was announced in November 2026.

==== Crossovers ====
Izuku Midoriya, All Might, Katsuki Bakugo, and Shoto Todoroki appeared as playable characters in the 2018 crossover fighting game Jump Force. Izuku Midoriya, Katsuki Bakugo, Ochaco Uraraka, All Might, Shoto Todoroki, Eijiro Kirishima, Mina Ashido, and the members of League of Villains appeared as cosmetic outfits for players to purchase in Fortnite. Additionally, the in-game abilities including "Deku's Smash" and "Todoroki's Ice Wall" were introduced. In December 2023, a Roblox game based on the anime, My Hero Academia: Battlegrounds, was produced by Gamefam in collaboration with Crunchyroll and Toho; and in September 2025, its second game My Hero Academia: Ultimate was also developed by Gamefam in collaboration with Crunchyroll.

Izuku and Katsuki were featured as playable characters in the Granblue Fantasy collaboration event from January 12–25, 2024. A collaboration with Overwatch 2 became available from October 17–30, 2024. The outfit skins featured Tracer as Deku, Juno as Uravity, Reinhardt as All Might, Kiriko as Himiko Toga, and Reaper as Tomura Shigaraki. As a first crossover with an anime franchise, the collaboration with Brawl Stars for the anime's tenth anniversary, developed and published by Toho International and Supercell, was announced in April 2026. The character skins for the game including the designs based on Izuku Midoriya, All Might, Katsuki Bakugo, Ochaco Uraraka, and Tomura Shigaraki. The collaboration became available until May 7.

=== Stage plays ===
My Hero Academia: The "Ultra" Stage, a stage play adaptation, was first announced in 2018 and ran from April 12–21 and April 26–29, 2019. The play was directed by Tsuneyasu Motoyoshi, written by Hideyuki Nishimori, and choreographed by Umebō. Shunsuke Wada composed the music. The cast includes Shin Tamura as Izuku Midoriya, Ryōta Kobayashi as Katsuki Bakugo, Yume Takuchi as Ochako Uraraka, Hiroki Ino as Tenya Iida, and Ryō Kitamura as Shoto Todoroki.

A second stage play adaptation, titled My Hero Academia: The "Ultra" Stage: A True Hero, was scheduled to run from March 6–22 and March 27 – April 5, 2020, with the cast and staff returning. However, due to the COVID-19 pandemic, My Hero Academia: The "Ultra" Stage: A True Hero's original run was canceled and postponed to July 2020, where a complete version, titled My Hero Academia: The "Ultra" Stage: A True Hero Plus Stage Ver., ran instead. After one staff member contracted COVID-19, the production committee announced that My Hero Academia: The "Ultra" Stage: A True Hero would instead be live-streamed; however, the play was delayed again after another staff member contracted COVID-19. The stage play ran in 2021 from December 3–12 and December 24–26.

A third stage play adaptation titled My Hero Academia The "Ultra" Stage: The Symbol of Peace was announced on December 26, 2021, and was scheduled to run from April 9–10, April 22–24, and April 29 – May 8, 2022. However, due to one of the actor's injury during a performance of the play, future performances were postponed.

A fourth stage play adaptation, titled My Hero Academia: The "Ultra" Stage: The Best Hero, was announced at the Jump Festa '23 event in December 2022. It ran from April 29 – May 7, May 12–14, and May 19–21, 2023.

=== Art and guidebooks ===
Two My Hero Academia art books and four guidebooks have been released by Shueisha. The first art book, titled My Hero Academia: Official Character Guide Ultra Archive Art Book, (Note: Japanese: 僕のヒーローアカデミア 公式キャラクターガイド ウルトラアーカイブ画集, Hepburn: Boku no Hīrō Akademia: Kōshiki Kyarakutā Gaido Urutora Ākaibu Gashū) was released on May 7, 2016. The first guidebook, titled My Hero Academia: Ultra Archive – The Official Character Guide, (Note: Japanese: 僕のヒーローアカデミア公式キャラクターブック Ultra Archive, Hepburn: Boku no Hīrō Akademia: Kōshiki Kyarakutā Bukku Urutora Ākaibu) was published on May 2, 2016. Accompanying the anime, the second guidebook, titled My Hero Academia: Ultimate Animation – The Official Book Guide, (Note: Japanese: 僕のヒーローアカデミア 公式ガイドブック Ultimate Animation Guide, Hepburn: Boku no Hīrō Akademia: Kōshiki Gaido Bukku Arutimetto Animēshon) was released on September 4, 2017. The third guidebook, titled My Hero Academia: Ultra Analysis – The Official Character Guide, (Note: Japanese: 僕のヒーローアカデミア 公式キャラクターブック2 Ultra Analysis, Hepburn: Boku no Hīrō Akademia: Kōshiki Kyarakutā Bukku 2 Urutora Anarishisu) was released on October 4, 2019. Viz Media has licensed the third guidebook for English release in North America, which was released on November 2, 2021. The fourth and final guidebook, titled My Hero Academia: Ultra Age – The Final Fan Book, (Note: Japanese: 僕のヒーローアカデミア ファイナルファンブック Ultra Age, Hepburn: Boku no Hīrō Akademia Fainaru Fanbukku Urutora Eiji) was released in Japan on May 2, 2025. The second and final art book, titled My Hero Academia: Official Illustration Collection Ultra Artworks, (Note: Japanese: 僕のヒーローアカデミア 公式イラスト集 Ultra Artworks, Hepburn: Boku no Hīrō Akademia: Kōshiki Irasuto-shū Urutora Ātowākusu) was released on June 4, 2025. Viz Media has licensed the second art book for English release in North America, which was released on October 13, 2026.

=== Other media ===
A drama CD titled My Hero Academia: Sweep! Local Area Cleaning! (僕のヒーローアカデミアハケ！ちいきせいそう！, Boku no Hīrō Akademia: Hake! Chiiki Seisou!) bundled with a limited edition of the seventh volume of the manga, released before the anime. Kōhei Horikoshi provides the original story and supervised the project, and the script is written by Yōsuke Kuroda who also wrote for the anime series. An interactive puzzle-solving event called "Heroes Dead End Program" was held on July 29 and 30, 2017. An exhibit of the series ran in Tokyo's Ikebukuro Sunshine City from September 30 to October 8, 2018.

An art exhibition, titled "My Hero Academia Drawing Smash", ran in Tokyo from April 23 to June 27, 2021, and in Osaka from July 16 to September 5, 2021. An animation exhibition with a theme of Heroes vs. Villains, titled My Hero Academia Anime: All-Out War Arc Exhibition, ran in various cities in Japan from April to November 2023. Another animation exhibition, titled My Hero Academia Ultra Animation Exhibition, ran in Tokyo and Osaka from December 2023 to March 2024. Another art exhibition, to celebrate the series' ten-year run, was held at Creative Museum Tokyo from June 21 to August 31, 2025, Namba Parks Museum in Osaka from October 25 to December 21, and at Mitsukoshi Gallery in Fukuoka from April 11 to June 14, 2026. It is set to be held in Sendai from January 16 to February 28, 2027, and Nagoya in Q2 of the same year. Additionally, two exhibitions to celebrate the anime's decade run will be held in 2027: the first, an animation-focused event titled My Hero Academia 10th Anniversary Exhibition: Our Hero, is scheduled to take place in Tokyo from January 8 to February 7 and in Osaka from March 5 to 28, while the second—named MHA Ultra Expo—is set to be held at Makuhari Messe in Chiba on April 17 and 18.

From March 1 to August 14, 2024, Universal Studios Japan hosted an attraction based on the series, as part of the "Cool Japan" program. My Hero Academia The Real 4-D attraction uses 3D visuals and special effects such as seat rumbles and splashes of water. It also includes an original story featuring Deku, Bakugo, Uraraka, and Todoroki facing off against a villain who appears at the concert of a world-famous rock performer. A live-action short film titled "Succession", commemorating the manga's tenth anniversary, released its video on YTV Animation's YouTube channel on April 27, 2024. It follows the lives of two brothers who grew up together with the manga series using its iconic quotes.

A global popularity poll titled "World Best Hero", commemorating the manga's ten-year run, was announced on August 5, 2024. The poll advertisement was published in the International edition of The New York Times on August 6. It is the first manga that Shueisha hosted a worldwide character popularity poll. The voting opened till September 30, with the winner on December 3 would get a statue designed by Horikoshi.

== Reception ==
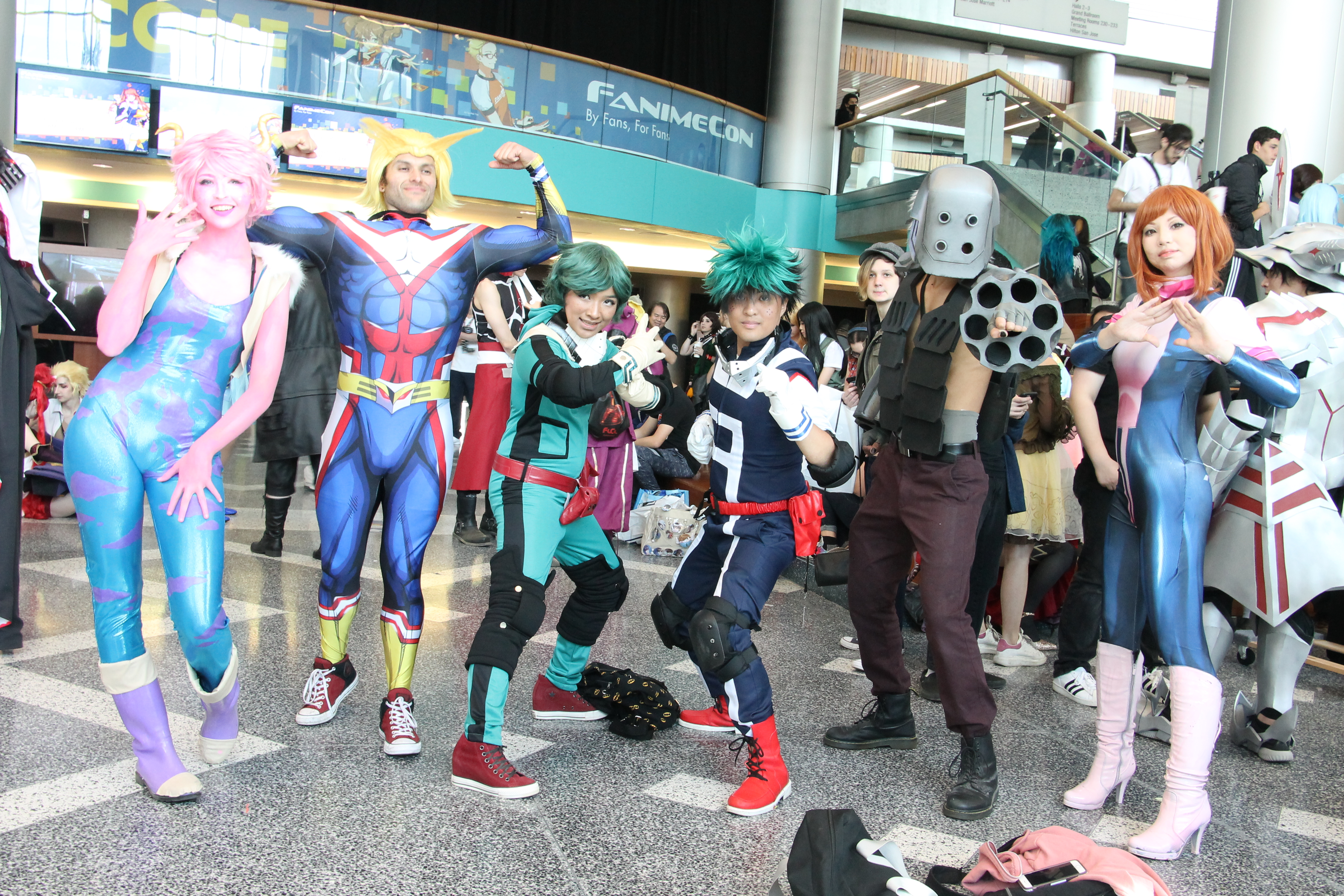
Fans cosplaying as characters from My Hero Academia at FanimeCon in 2018

=== Popularity ===
My Hero Academia ranked second on the "Nationwide Bookstore Employees' Recommended Comics of 2015" poll by Honya Club online bookstore. The series has been ranked on the "Book of the Year" list from Media Factory's Da Vinci magazine, where professional book reviewers, bookstore employees, and Da Vinci readers participate; it ranked 26th in 2015; 22nd in 2016; 16th in 2018; 37th in 2019; 41st in 2020; 34th in 2021; 22nd in 2022; 19th in 2024; and 28th in 2025. On Takarajimasha's Kono Manga ga Sugoi! ranking of the top 20 manga for male readers, it ranked fifth on the 2016 list. On TV Asahi's Manga Sōsenkyo 2021 poll, in which 150,000 people voted for their top 100 manga series, My Hero Academia ranked 16th. On a 2021 survey conducted by Line Research asking Japanese high school students what manga series they are currently into, the series ranked second among boys.

The story has been noted to take inspiration from elements in American superhero comics, such as the aesthetics of its characters, and due to the popularity of the series, characters of My Hero Academia were used to promote the Marvel Studios films Avengers: Infinity War and Captain America: Brave New World. Before the anime adaptation's premiere, Naruto's creator Masashi Kishimoto praised Kōhei Horikoshi's work, and said: "My Hero Academia is finally getting animated! Congratulations! To put into words this sensation, which I know firsthand... it's probably a great feeling. [Considering] the original work and the studio, Bones... you don't need the 'probably,' it's a great feeling. People who know it will get it! Internationally, even... in any case, it's a great feeling. It's the same feeling I had when my work was first animated – no, [the series] is more than that! And they aren't making me say this, it's the truth." Kishimoto also believed that it would be a success overseas. One Piece creator Eiichiro Oda also praised the series. After the manga's completion, writers, editors, the anime's staff and cast, and stage play actors expressed congratulations to Horikoshi for his work.

The series' characters have also been highly popular for cosplaying, especially in Japan, where a poll surveyed by Cosplayers Archive ranked My Hero Academia ninth in Q3 2017. According to the retailer Zavvi, where they surveyed Instagram hashtags containing franchise names followed by the term "cosplay", My Hero Academia was the most popular franchise among cosplayers worldwide with 2,377,476 posts, ranking above companies and franchises such as DC Comics, Marvel, Disney, Star Wars, Naruto, Attack on Titan, Demon Slayer: Kimetsu no Yaiba, Pokémon, and Sailor Moon. The retailer stated that the result demonstrates the "recent growth of anime". They also surveyed hashtags containing character names, where three My Hero Academia characters placed in the top ten rankings: Izuku ranked fifth with 224,429 posts, Shoto came at seventh with 177,161 posts, and Katsuki at ninth with 147,600 posts.

On Tumblr's Year in Review, which highlights the largest communities, fandoms, and trends on the platform throughout the year, My Hero Academia ranked first in the Top Anime & Manga Shows category from 2018 to 2021. The characters also placed highly in the rankings of the Top Anime & Manga Characters category. In 2019, Izuku Midoriya ranked first, with 17 other spots being occupied by other My Hero Academia characters in the top 50 list; seven were ranked on the top 10 list in 2020; and five in 2021. The series also ranked fifth on Tumblr's Top 10 overall in the 2018 list; it ranked ninth on the Top 20 overall in 2020; and tenth on the Top 21 overall in 2021. It placed seventeenth on Twitter Japan's Trend Awards in 2021, based on the social network's top trending topics of the year.

=== Sales ===
My Hero Academia has been a significant commercial success since the manga's release; in 2014, the first volume reached seventh place on Oricon's weekly manga chart with 71,575 copies sold. It sold out almost immediately on its first printing. Volume two reached sixth place, with 167,531 copies and, by January 18, 2015, had sold 205,179 copies. In April 2015, volume three reached eighth place with 254,111 copies. Volume four reached sixth with 259,137 in June, and volume five peaked at ninth place with 279,414 copies in August.

By March 2017, the manga had over 10 million copies in circulation; over 13 million copies in circulation by February 2018; over 15 million copies in circulation by May 2018; over 16 million copies in circulation by August 2018; over 17 million copies in circulation by September 2018; over 20 million copies in circulation by December 2018; over 21 million copies in circulation by February 2019; over 26 million copies in circulation by December 2019; over 30 million copies in circulation by January 2021; over 50 million copies in circulation by April 2021, with 37 million being sold in Japan and the remaining 13 million in the rest of the world; over 65 million copies in circulation by January 2022, with 45 million being sold in Japan and the remaining 20 million elsewhere; over 85 million copies in circulation by February 2023; and over 100 million copies in circulation by April 2024. (Note: Including the number of spin-off manga)

The My Hero Academia franchise sales generated an estimated ¥16 billion in revenue in Japan between 2016 and 2020. The series was the sixth best-selling manga series in the first half of 2017, with over 2 million copies sold, while volumes 12 and 13 were some of the top 50 best-selling manga volumes. By the end of the year, it was the fourth best-selling manga series with over 5.8 million copies sold, while volumes 12–15 were among the 50 best-selling manga volumes. In 2018, the seventeenth volume of the manga had received an initial print run of 600,000 copies. It was the fifth best-selling manga in the first half of 2018 with over 2.5 million copies sold, while volumes 17 and 18 were the thirteenth and seventeenth best-selling manga volumes, respectively. The series ranked sixth on Rakuten's Top 20 Best Selling Digital Manga of 2018. It was the second best-selling manga of 2018, behind One Piece, with over 6.7 million copies sold; volumes 17–20 were among the 50 best-selling manga volumes, having sold over 3 million copies combined. The 22nd volume topped Oricon's ranking sales chart list in February 2019, with 576,148 copies sold. The series was the fourth best-selling manga in the first half of 2019, with over 3.1 million copies sold; volumes 21–23 were among the 50 best-selling manga volumes of the year. It was the sixth best-selling manga in 2019, with over 5 million copies sold. Along with One-Punch Man, the series had an initial print run of 660,000 copies, with its 26th volume in 2020. The series was the fifth best-selling manga in the first half of 2020, with over 3 million copies sold. It ranked twelfth on Rakuten's Top 20 Best Selling Digital Manga of 2020.

My Hero Academia was the eighth best-selling manga series in 2020, with over 6 million copies sold. The 29th volume had an initial print run of 680,000 copies in 2021. The series was the fifth best-selling manga in 2021 and 2022, with over 7 million and 5.3 million copies sold, respectively; volumes 33–35 were among the 30 best-selling manga volumes of 2022. It ranked eighth on Rakuten's Top 20 Best Selling Digital Manga of 2021, and ninth in 2022. Volumes 37–39 were among the best-selling manga volumes of 2023. The series ranked twelfth on Rakuten's Top 20 Best Selling Digital Manga of 2023. Volume 38 was Shueisha's fifth-highest first print run manga volume of 2023–2024 (period from April 2023 to March 2024), with 815,000 copies printed. Volume 40 was the sixth best-selling manga volume of 2023–2024 (period from November 2023 to May 2024), with 560,867 copies sold. In December 2024, the 42nd and final volume sold 1 million copies in its first week, making My Hero Academia the fourth manga series to achieve this feat in a single print volume, with the others being Demon Slayer: Kimetsu no Yaiba, Attack on Titan, and One Piece. It was also the series' highest-selling manga volume in Oricon's first week chart, with 616,671 copies sold. Its volume had an initial print run of 850,000 copies printed, making it Shueisha's sixth-highest first print run manga volume of 2024–2025 (period from April 2024 to March 2025). The final volume was also the fifth best-selling manga volume of 2025, with 977,955 copies sold.

In North America, the volumes of My Hero Academia appeared on The New York Times Manga Best Seller list for several weeks, with volume one, which was released in August 2015, debuting at fourth place. The volumes were also ranked on Circana (formerly NPD) BookScan's monthly top 20 adult graphic novels list since August 2016, while it was on the top 20 manga graphic novels list in September, October and December 2018. In Q4 2018, My Hero Academia was the best-selling manga franchise according to ICv2. Several volumes of the manga have also been ranked on The New York Times' Graphic Books and Manga bestseller monthly list since November 2019. Volumes 1 and 26 ranked third and sixth, respectively, on Publishers Weekly's bestseller list in March 2021. Volume 28 also charted on the Publishers Weekly's bestseller list in September 2021, ranking fifth.

According to ICv2, My Hero Academia was the fifth best-selling manga franchise in Q4 2021 (September–December) in the United States. According to NPD BookScan, it was the best-selling manga series in 2020, with nine volumes featured on the top 20 adult graphic novels list; seven volumes were ranked among the top 20 highest-selling manga volumes in 2021; two volumes were among the top 20 highest-selling manga volumes in 2022 and 2023. The first volume had over 1.2 million copies in circulation by 2022 and the franchise as a whole has over 10 million copies in circulation in the United States.

=== Critical reception ===
Nick Creamer of Anime News Network gave the first volume a B rating. Creamer praised Horikoshi's artwork, describing it as "absolutely professional" and "consistent and highly polished", but also stated that it was fast-paced and very sharply drawn. He praised the plot and characters, saying that despite it feeling like a typical shōnen plot, it did well enough to still feel fresh and entertaining. He also stated that the characters had great energy and personality. Isaac Akers from The Fandom Post gave the second volume a B+ rating. He praised the art, saying that Horikoshi's character designs and art bolster the volume's ability to feel as if it does everything it does just because the volume likes doing it. He concluded that My Hero Academia was a difficult series to dislike, making it as the "real joy to read" by executing the author's ideas and having enough nerve and twist. Sean Gaffney from A Case Suitable for Treatment referred to the art as "smooth" and complemented how it flows with the action. Gaffney also praised the story, characters, and fight scenes, stating that the story flows nicely with each of their individual personalities, while the fight scenes look smooth and non-confusing.

In a review of the second volume, Leroy Douresseaux from Comic Book Bin also praised the story, specifically the way it executed comedy and drama. He also compared the series to the other superhero works such as Tiger & Bunny and One-Punch Man, stating that My Hero Academia proved that "manga can do superhero comic books that are every bit as imaginative as American superhero comics". Manga Bookshelf praised the first volume for its art, saying that it demonstrated Horikoshi's skill very well, though criticizing it for having too much narration at some points. Reviewing volumes 1 to 19, Michelle Smith from Soliloquy in Blue called the plot "very good", but also stated that the main reason she liked the series was the characters, specifically praising most of the main cast. However, she criticized the series for not giving some of the female characters enough spotlight despite praising their varied character designs and personalities.

The series was chosen as one of the Best Manga at the Comic-Con International Best & Worst Manga in 2018 and 2019. Barnes & Noble named it on their list of "Our Favorite Manga of 2018", saying that "it combines the earnestness of superhero comics with the core elements of shonen manga", but also stated that the reason the story was a delight was due to Horikoshi's "endlessly inventive imagination", praising most of the characters' abilities that are more "quirks" than superpowers. Cold Cobra of Anime UK News picked the series for his list of "best manga of 2010s", praising its mix between the Japanese shonen action genre and American superhero comics. He stated that its cast of characters is what makes it stand out more than anything. He described the artwork as "wonderfully expressive and occasionally impressively shaded for those big full-page moments", which made it a joy to read.

=== Awards and nominations ===
Year	Award	Category	Result	Ref.
2015	1st Next Manga Award	Print Manga	Won	
2015	8th Manga Taishō	Manga Taishō	8th place	
2015	Mandō Kobayashi Manga Award	Manga Grand Prix	Won	
2016	40th Kodansha Manga Award	Best Shōnen Manga	Nominated	
2016	Da Vinci 16th Annual Book of the Year	Book of the Year	22nd place	
2017	Japan Expo Awards	Daruma d'Or Manga	Won	
2017	Japan Expo Awards	Best Shōnen	Nominated	
2017	3rd Sugoi Japan Award	Best Manga	Won	
2017	44th Angoulême International Comics Festival	Best Youth Comic	Nominated	
2017	23rd Saló del Manga de Barcelona	Best Shōnen Manga	Won	
2018	Japan Expo Awards	Daruma for Best Shōnen	Won	
2018	30th Harvey Awards	Best Manga	Nominated	
2018	24th Saló del Manga de Barcelona	Best Shōnen Manga	Won	
2018	Da Vinci 18th Annual Book of the Year	Book of the Year	16th place	
2019	31st Harvey Awards	Best Manga	Won	
2020	47th Angoulême International Comics Festival	Best Youth Comic	Nominated	
2022	Da Vinci 22nd Annual Book of the Year	Book of the Year	22nd place	
2024	Da Vinci 24th Annual Book of the Year	Book of the Year	19th place	

=== Unit 731 controversy ===
In early 2020, the series caused a controversy in South Korea and China for a character's name allegedly referencing Unit 731, an infamous Imperial Japanese army unit known its immensely brutal and inhumane experiments on prisoners of war (POWs), including the vivisecting of captured Chinese, Korean, and Russian soldiers and civilians. In response, the series has been removed from digital platforms in China, and the character's name was changed to no longer reference Unit 731. A day prior, both Weekly Shōnen Jump manga magazine publisher Shueisha and the manga's author Kōhei Horikoshi issued individual apology statements on Twitter.

In the aftermath of the manga's removal from its services in China, the English-language news service Abacus reached out to bilibili and Tencent for its request. The former stated that the removal was "in accordance with China's policies" but declined to comment further, while the latter did not respond to Abacus' request for comment. The character's name was changed again in the digital version of Weekly Shōnen Jump following the backlash. Shueisha promised that "going forward, we intend to devote our energies toward deepening our understanding of a variety of historical and cultural matters." Both the publisher and manga's creator reiterated that the reference to war crimes within the character's name was wholly unintentional.

Following the controversy, the work has often been regarded as anti-China. In June 2025, there were multiple reports of cosplayers portraying characters from the work being attacked in China.
