= Katsuki Bakugo =

Superhero from My Hero Academia

- My Hero Academia character
- Katsuki as pictured from the cover of My Hero Academia, Volume 13
- First appearance: My Hero Academia #1, "Izuku Midoriya: Origin", July 7, 2014
- Created by: Kōhei Horikoshi
- Portrayed by: Ryōta Kobayashi
- Voiced by: Japanese: Nobuhiko Okamoto; Yuichiro Umehara (vomic); Rie Takahashi (young, vomic); Sachi Kokuryu (young); English: Clifford Chapin; Kate Oxley (young)

In-universe information
- Aliases: "Kacchan"; "Great Explosion Murder God Dynamight"; "Dynamight"
- Occupation: Student at U.A. High School; Superhero
- Affiliation: Best Jeanist Agency (formerly); Endeavor Agency (formerly)
- Family: Mitsuki Bakugo (mother); Masaru Bakugo (father)
- Nationality: Japanese
- Quirk: Explosion

Katsuki Bakugo (Japanese: 爆豪 勝己, Hepburn: Bakugō Katsuki), also known by his nickname Kacchan (used by Izuku Midoriya in the series) (かっちゃん, Kacchan) and his hero name Great Explosion Murder God Dynamight (大・爆・殺・神ダイナマイト, Daibaku Kisshin Dainamaito), is a superhero and one of the main protagonists of the manga series My Hero Academia, created by Kōhei Horikoshi. Katsuki's Quirk is Explosion (爆破), which allows him to make explosions from his hands by detonating the nitroglycerin-like substance he sweats; throughout the series, he learns various different ways to apply this. Overuse of the Quirk can cause pulsating pain in his arms and shoulders.

As a child, Katsuki bullied his childhood best friend, the Quirkless Izuku Midoriya giving him the moniker Deku. However, after they both entered U.A. High School and Katsuki lost to Izuku in training, he began to see him differently. After Katsuki is kidnapped by the League of Villains, All Might loses his Quirk in the process of saving him, which made him blame himself for All Might's retirement, though All Might later reassures him it was not his fault. Katsuki later becomes one of the only people who knows the true nature of Izuku's Quirk as Izuku trusts him with this secret and so did All Might.

Katsuki is voiced by Nobuhiko Okamoto in Japanese and Clifford Chapin in English. His character has received positive reviews from critics, with many praising his development throughout the series and his relationship with Izuku. The voice performances in both Japanese and English dub also received praise. The character has also consistently ranked in the series' popularity polls, most commonly he placed first. Fans have drawn comparison between Bakugo and Vegeta from Dragon Ball franchise.

== Creation and conception ==
In the first draft of the series, Katsuki was a genius with a nice personality, though Horikoshi scrapped this idea because it was too boring. Instead, he decided to make the character ruthless and ambitious. Horikoshi originally intended to keep Katsuki with the unempathetic personality, though later decided to give him development into a kinder person as the story went on. After the series' anime adaptation premiered, Horikoshi began writing the character with Nobuhiko Okamoto's voice in mind. Horikoshi had not expected Katsuki to become a popular character, so he was surprised to see the character rank well in the popularity polls.

Katsuki's English voice actor, Clifford Chapin, has commented that he often has to end recording sessions early due to his voice getting worn out from all the screaming the character does. Chapin prefers voice acting the more calmer and emotional scenes with the character, even making the character accidentally sound too vulnerable at times.

=== Abilities ===
Katsuki's Quirk is Explosion; it works by Katsuki sweating a nitroglycerin-like substance from his palms, which he can detonate at will. Throughout the series, Katsuki learns to apply this in different ways, such as to move through the air, create blinding flashes of light, catapult allies towards enemies, or create shockwaves to serve as defense. However, overuse makes his forearms ache.

== Appearances ==
=== In My Hero Academia ===
Katsuki begins the series as an intelligent student with aspirations of being the world's greatest hero, but had an arrogant, violent and crude personality. He often bullied Izuku Midoriya with reasons being currently unknown, during their childhood. Katsuki was the one to give Midoriya the moniker "Deku" (an alternate kun'yomi reading of his given name's kanji that is homophonous with 木偶, meaning "useless person; good for nothing"; treated as a clipped compound of "Defenseless Izuku" in English translations) to mock his perceived worthlessness in superhero society. However, after Izuku was given the generations-old Quirk, One For All, he and Katsuki enter the prestigious U.A. High School and are both enrolled in Class 1-A. Katsuki receives character development on par with Izuku, learning the importance of teamwork and co-operation, becoming a leader, accepting help, and how to save others in order to win. He also begins developing a friendship with classmates Eijiro Kirishima and Denki Kaminari. However, Katsuki still holds onto his habit of yelling.

After being kidnapped by the League of Villains, and refusing their offer to join them, Katsuki is rescued by All Might, his childhood hero. However, All Might's hero career comes to an end as he uses the last of his powers in the fight against the mastermind and his arch-enemy, All For One, which fills Katsuki with guilt that he was the one who put an end to the great hero's career. After failing the Provisional Hero Licensing Exam due to his guilt and aggressive attitude, Katsuki takes Izuku out to Testing Ground Gamma, and reveals he has finally put the pieces together on how Izuku received his Quirk, One For All, from All Might. After that, Katsuki challenges Izuku to a battle to deal with his guilt and ask why it was Izuku who was chosen to receive One For All, when they both grew up admiring All Might just as much as each other. After defeating Izuku, All Might arrives to stop the fight, reassures him that what happened was not his fault, and tells him the Origins of All For One, the injury that limited his hero work, his need for a successor, and All For One. After agreeing to keep this information secret, Katsuki becomes one of the few people to know the truth about One for All. As they return to the U.A. dorms, Katsuki promises Izuku that he will surpass him one day, to which Izuku responds that he will simply have to go even higher still than Katsuki, forming a proper rivalry between the two. Bakugo thinks that Izuku has been hiding his quirk all this time even when Bakugo bullied him for being Quirkless until Izuku explained to him later that he just got it and that it is a borrowed quirk that was passed on to him.

This rivalry becomes a quick rekindling of their childhood friendship and the pair talk more since the fight, although sometimes playfully antagonistic. As one of the only people who know Izuku's secret, Katsuki is often found training with Izuku to help him master his awakening Quirks and even sits in on his meetings with All Might about One For All. While gaining valuable lessons attending his internship with Izuku and Shoto, Katsuki's heart begins to open up more to people. However, the turning point for Katsuki's character happens during the war with the Paranormal Liberation Army. Katsuki watches on as Izuku, who has been giving his all to keep Tomura Shigaraki in the air, is about to die to Tomura's piercing attack. In a moment of pure urgency, Katsuki awakens a new explosive technique that propels him fast enough to push Izuku out of the way and tank the hits himself.

After Izuku left U.A. High School during the Dark Deku Arc, Katsuki and the rest of Class 1-A track down Izuku to bring him back to U.A. To convince Izuku to come back, Katsuki gives a big apology speech to him. He admits the reason he had to bully and reject Izuku was because of his jealousy in feeling the Quirkless boy's mindset was more passionate & closer to being a hero than he was (this would suggest he knew becoming a hero has nothing to do with being special or having powers). He also admits that he had been taking his inferiority complex out on Izuku the entire time. In the end, he finishes by saying the words he had been wanting to say since they had both almost died: he is so sorry for everything. Along with informing Izuku (which he says for the first time) that the latter's path was not ever misguided the moment he gained One for All, which he rightfully deserved.

During the final battle, Katsuki faces off against an All For One-possessed Tomura Shigaraki, who gives him a fatal blow to the chest, killing him. After being resurrected by the hero Edgeshot using his "Zenith" ability, Katsuki returns to battle, despite his injuries, and uses his powers to battle All For One, whom he manages to kill after he is reverted to an infant before collapsing out of exhaustion. After regaining consciousness and discovering All For One is still alive in Tomura, he uses his explosion powers to shoot himself over to Tomura and Izuku in battle at Mount Fuji, and, with Shoto's help, uses an explosion to kill League member Kurogiri before he is able to teleport Tomura away. With this, Katsuki allows Izuku to land his final punch on Tomura, finally defeating him and the last of All For One.

After graduating from U.A., Katsuki becomes one of Japan's top heroes and leads the funding for a new powered suit that allows Izuku to become a hero again.

=== Other media ===
Katsuki was added to the Jump Force video game as a DLC character in August 2019. In a crossover promotion with Avengers: Infinity War, Katsuki shared a brief conversation with Iron Man. In My Hero Academia: Ultra Archive - The Official Character Guide, he also appears in an omake with Ochaco Uraraka set during a final examination in chapter 68, where they talk about Izuku Midoriya.

Katsuki appears alongside Izuku Midoriya, Ochaco Uraraka, and All Might in Fortnite as a crossover character.

Ryōta Kobayashi portrayed Katsuki in a My Hero Academia stage play.

== Reception ==
=== Popularity ===
In a 2018 My Hero Academia character popularity poll by Crunchyroll, Katsuki ranked in seventh place with 2,794 votes. He placed fifth in the Viz Media's first Weekly Shonen Jump popularity poll. In the yearly Japanese My Hero Academia popularity polls, Katsuki has consistently ranked first ahead of other popular characters such as Izuku Midoriya and Shoto Todoroki. In Tumblr's top anime and manga characters, Katsuki ranked second behind Izuku in 2019 and 2020; and third in 2021. Anime! Anime! took popularity polls for the hero characters. Katsuki ranked as the fifth most popular character in 2021, eighth in 2022, and seventh in 2023. In 2024, in the "World Best Hero" global poll, he was found to be the franchise's most popular character overall. At the Crunchyroll's inaugural Anime Awards, his fight against Deku was nominated for Best Fight Scene. At the 10th edition, Katsuki won "Best Supporting Character". Fábio Lucindo was nominated in the "Best Voice Artist Performance (Portuguese)" category for his performance as Katsuki, but lost to Charles Emmanuel's Akaza.

=== Critical response ===
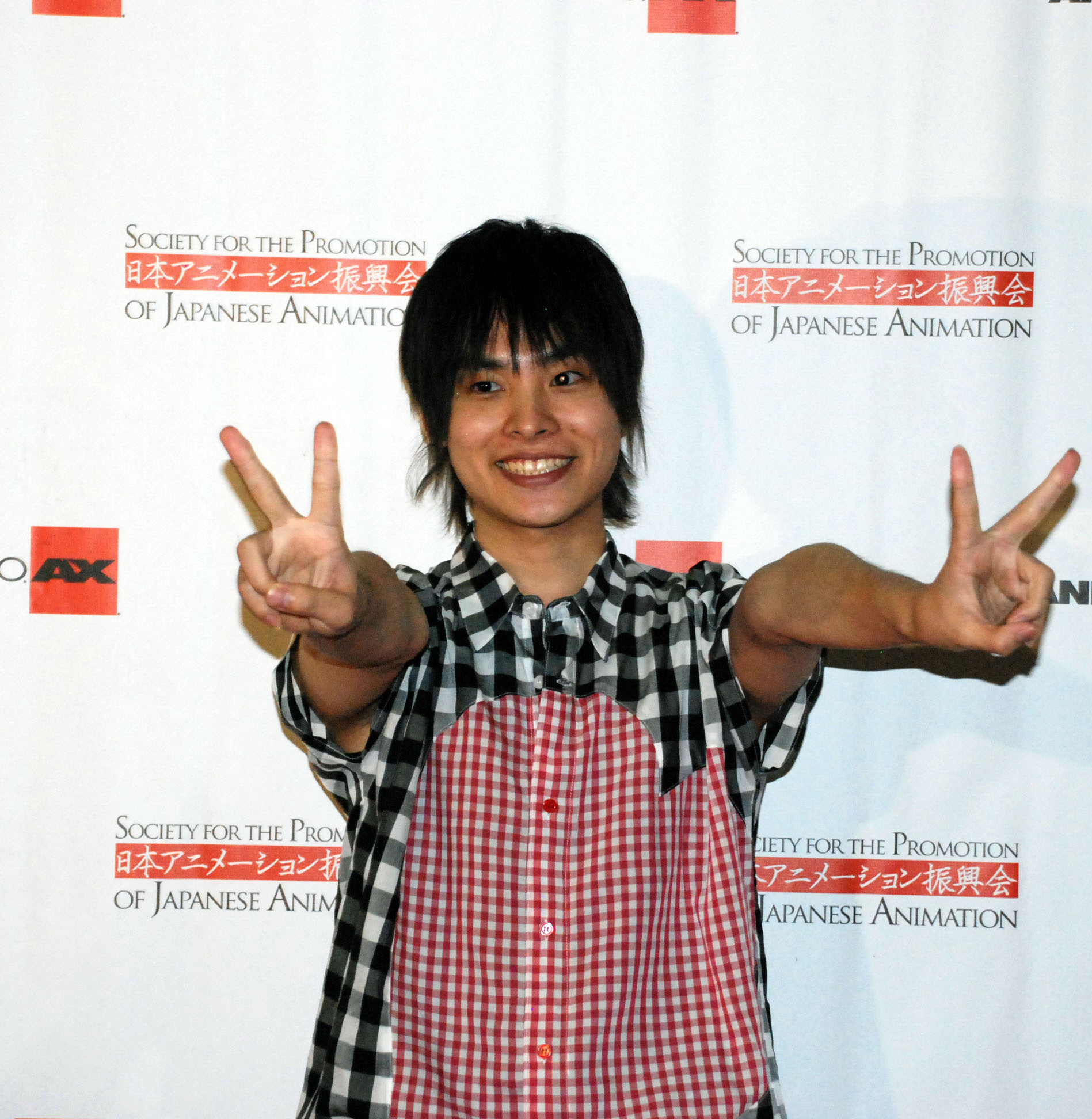
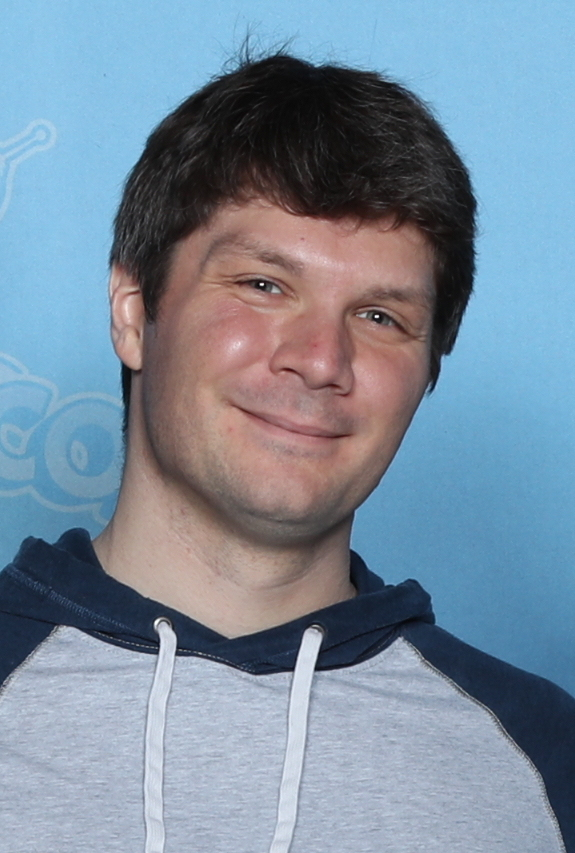
Nobuhiko Okamoto (left) and Clifford Chapin (right) both received praise for their voice performances as Katsuki.

Alex Osborn from IGN praised the character and his development throughout the series. Daniel Kurland from Den of Geek also praised the character; he also praised Chapin's English performance of the character. Sam Leach from Anime News Network praised the character as amazing; he also praised Okamoto's voice performance as the character. The reviewer for Anime UK News also offered praise for the character. The columnists for Manga News had similar feelings, praising the character and his development. Steven Blackburn from Screen Rant praised Katsuki's development throughout the series, though questioned some of the decisions made by the character in the later parts of the series. Chelsey Adams from Comic Book Resources felt that Katsuki became more likeable as the series progressed. Briana Lawrence from The Mary Sue praised Katsuki's character development and personality, calling the character relatable.

Actor Ryo Yoshizawa praised the character.
