= Shoto Todoroki =

Superhero from My Hero Academia

- My Hero Academia character
- First appearance: My Hero Academia #6, "What I Can Do For Now", August 11, 2014
- Created by: Kōhei Horikoshi
- Portrayed by: Ryō Kitamura
- Voiced by: Japanese: Yuki Kaji; Kei Shindō (young); English: David Matranga; Mikaela Krantz (young)

In-universe information
- Aliases: Shoto; Todoroki-kun; Icy-Hot; Half'n'half; The Hand Crusher; Five Wienies
- Gender: Male
- Occupation: Student (Former); Superhero
- Affiliation: Endeavor Agency (formerly)
- Family: Enji Todoroki (father); Rei Todoroki (mother); Dabi (brother); Fuyumi Todoroki (sister); Natsuo Todoroki (brother)
- Nationality: Japanese
- Quirk: Half-Cold Half-Hot

Shoto Todoroki (Japanese: 轟 焦凍, Hepburn: Todoroki Shōto), also known by the mononym Shoto (ショート, Shōto), is a superhero and one of the main protagonists of the manga series My Hero Academia, created by Kōhei Horikoshi. The youngest child of pro-hero Endeavor and civilian Rei Todoroki, he is the only one of their four children to have obtained both their respective fire and ice powers, or quirks. Shoto began to despise his father due to experiencing abusive training from him as a child, alongside witnessing how he abused his mother, and initially refused to use his fire powers, only starting to use them again after a fight with UA High classmate Izuku Midoriya.

Shoto's Quirk is Half-Cold Half-Hot (半冷半燃, Hanrei Han'nen), which allows him to shoot flames from the left side of his body and freeze things with the right side of his body. However, there are drawbacks to either side's overuse.

Shoto is voiced by Yuki Kaji in Japanese and David Matranga in English. His character has received positive reception by critics, with many praising his development and origins in the anime. He has also consistently ranked in the series' popularity polls, most commonly being placed third.

== Creation and conception ==
Shoto was the fourth student in Class 1-A to be created by Horikoshi, following Izuku Midoriya, Katsuki Bakugo, and Ochaco Uraraka. Originally Horikoshi had intended the UA Sports Festival solely to develop Shoto's character, though later had to expand it to give more characters a chance to be in the spotlight.

In the series' anime adaptation, Shoto is voiced by Yuki Kaji in Japanese and David Matranga in English. In the stage play, he is portrayed by Ryō Kitamura.

=== Abilities ===
Shoto's Quirk is Half-Cold Half-Hot, which allows him to freeze things with the right side of his body and shoot flames from the left side of his body. After overcoming the reluctance to use his flame powers, he learns different ways to combine both powers effectively. However, overuse of his powers could cause him to suffer from frostbite or heat stroke.

== Appearances ==
=== In My Hero Academia ===
Shoto is the youngest of four siblings from Endeavor (Enji Todoroki) and Rei Todoroki. However, unlike his siblings, Shoto was the only one who inherited both Endeavor and Rei's quirks, which was Endeavor's goal with the marriage, because he wanted a successor who could defeat All Might. When Shoto was a child, he was subjugated to harsh physical training by Endeavor, who would beat Shoto to make him stronger. His mother was also abused by her husband, which resulted in her pouring boiling hot water on the left side of Shoto's face in a fit of shock due to his resemblance to Endeavor, the man who had abused her. The injury caused a scar around his left eye, and negatively affected both Shoto's mental health and his feelings towards his father, alienating himself from his peers. Due to this distaste for his father, he refused to use the fire portion of his Quirk, or socialize with other classmates. After his fight against Izuku Midoriya in the U.A. Sports Festival, Shoto began to be more accepting of his fire powers. Shoto also became more sociable as a result of spending more time with his classmates.

=== Other media ===
Shoto was added to the crossover video game Jump Force as a DLC character on May 26, 2020. In a crossover promotion with Avengers: Infinity War, Shoto shared a brief conversation with Thor.

Shoto was also added as an outfit in the free-to-play game Fortnite along with Eijiro Kirishima and Mina Ashido, as well as his superpower, showcased as a mythic ability in the game.

== Reception ==
=== Popularity ===
In a 2018 My Hero Academia character popularity poll by Crunchyroll, Shoto ranked in second place with 6,477 votes. He placed sixth in the Viz Media's first Weekly Shonen Jump popularity poll. In the yearly Japanese My Hero Academia popularity polls, Shoto has consistently ranked third behind Katsuki Bakugo and Izuku Midoriya, although he has placed second in the first and fourth polls. In Tumblr's top anime and manga characters, Shoto ranked third behind Izuku and Katsuki in 2019; seventh in 2020; and eighth in 2021. Anime! Anime! took popularity polls for the hero characters. Shoto ranked as the sixth most popular character in 2021, and eleventh in 2023. In the same website poll for the characters with ice/snow abilities, he ranked first from 2021 to 2023. In 2024, in the "World Best Hero" global poll, he was found to be the franchise's third most popular character overall behind Bakugo and Izuku. In the Animedia Character Awards, he won the "Coolest" award. At the 2nd Crunchyroll Anime Awards, Shoto won the award for Best Boy. He was also one of the five recipients for the "Best Boys of the Decade" category in the Funimation's Decade of Anime fan poll.

Female WWE wrestler Zelina Vega had carried the hairstyle of Shoto Todoroki as part of her anime-inspired ring gear.

=== Critical response ===
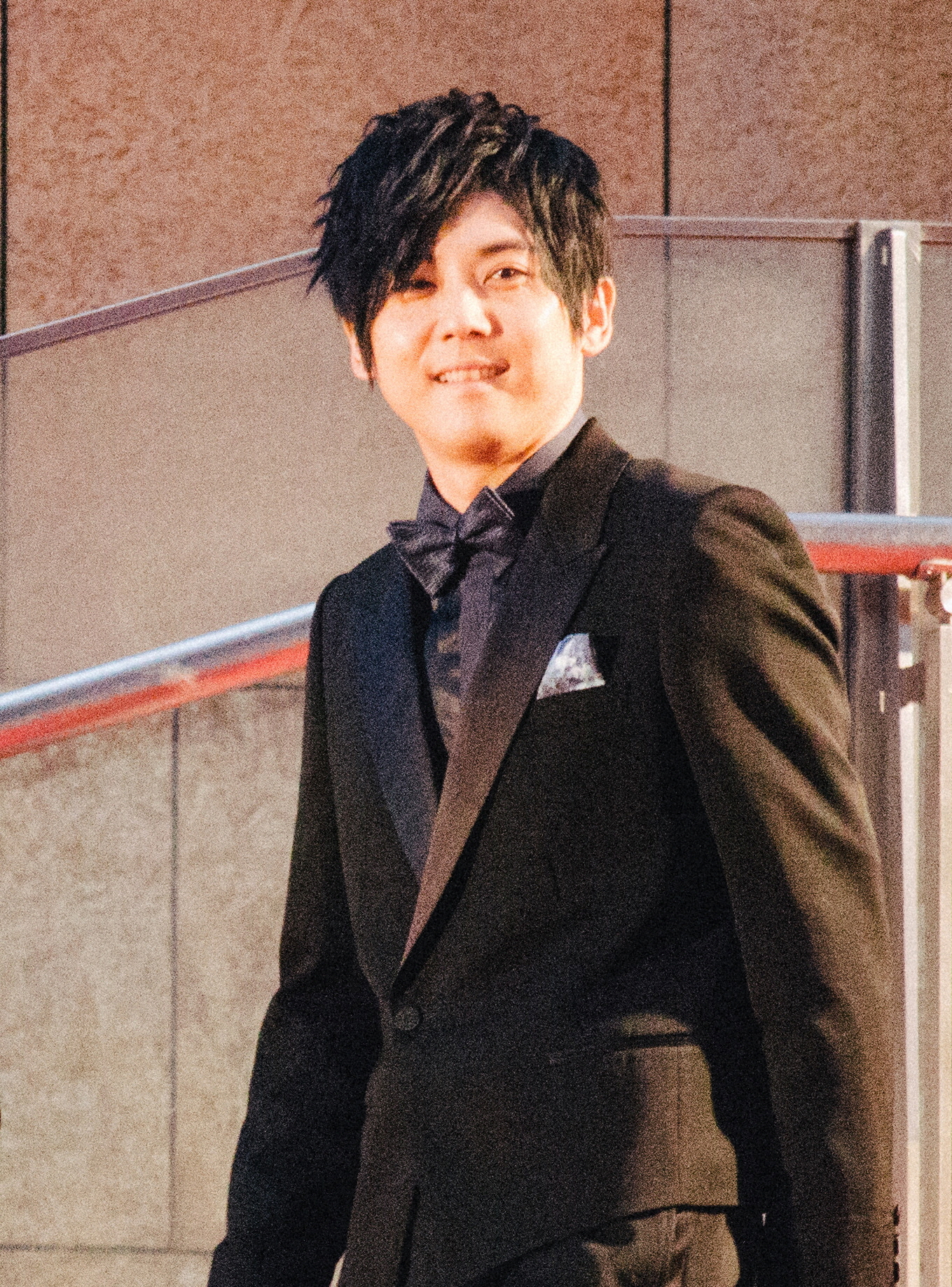
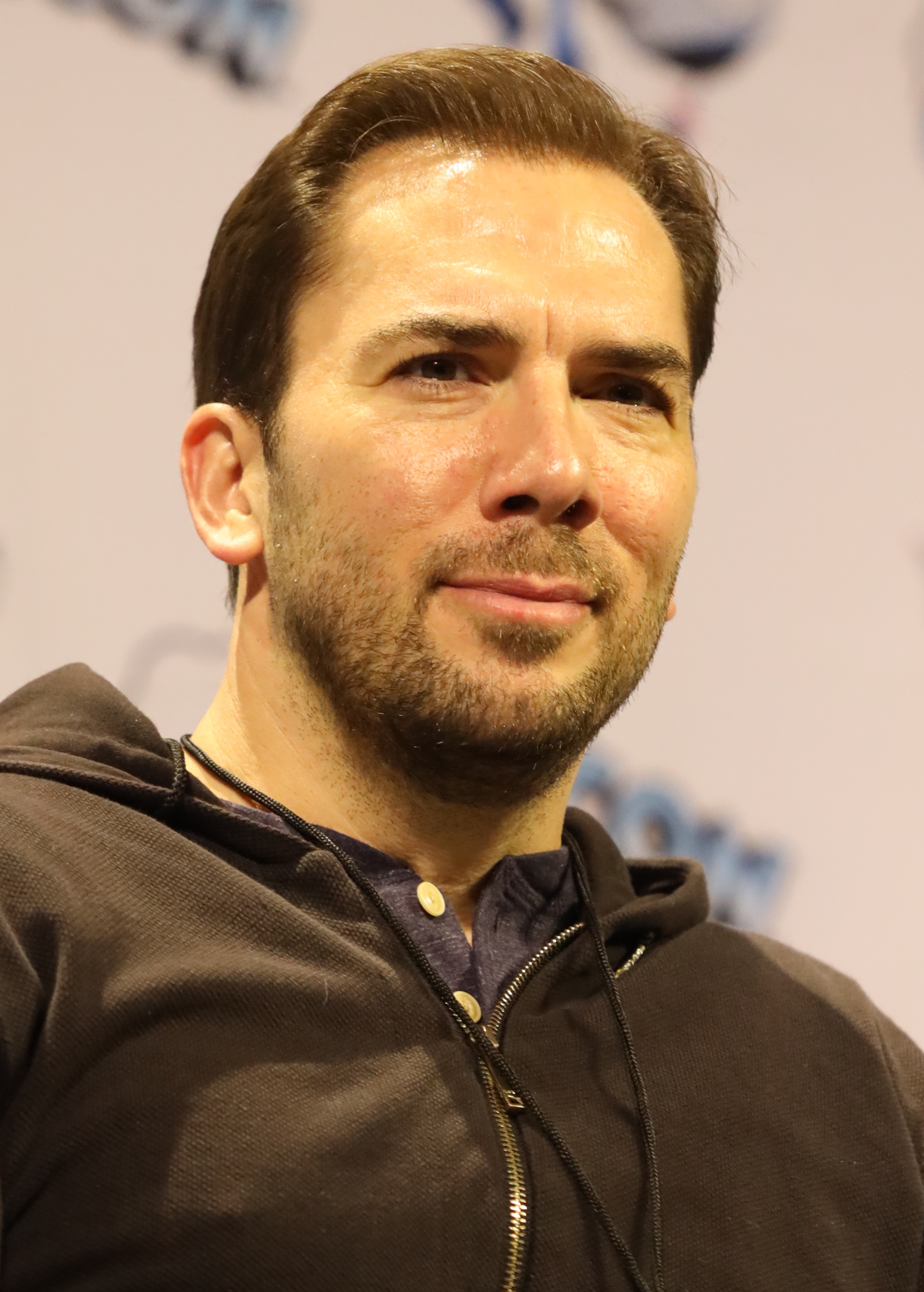
Yuki Kaji (left) and David Matranga (right) both received praise for their voice performances as Shoto.

Alex Osborn from IGN praised Shoto and his origins as emotional. Daniel Kurland from Den of Geek also offered some praise, stating that Shoto was one of the coolest characters of the series. The Anime UK News reviewer praised the character, as well as his voice actor in both the original Japanese and English dubbed versions. Princess Weekes and Briana Lawrence of The Mary Sue also offered praise for Shoto, specifically for his character development and personality. Brittney Hemmands of Comic Book Resources felt that Shoto became less likeable as the series progressed. Götz Piesbergen from Splash Comics praised the character as unique and enjoyable. Mickaël Géreaume from Planete BD praised Shoto as an endearing character. Columnists from Manga News praised the character development and origin story of Shoto.

Naruto creator Masashi Kishimoto praised the character.
