= My Hero Academia: Smash!! =

Japanese manga series by Hirofumi Neda

- Cover of the first manga volume

僕のヒーローアカデミアすまっしゅ!! (Boku no Hīrō Academia Sumasshu!!)
- Genre: Comedy; Superhero
- Created by: Kōhei Horikoshi
- Manga
- Written by: Hirofumi Neda
- Published by: Shueisha
- English publisher: NA: Viz Media
- Imprint: Jump Comics+
- Magazine: Shōnen Jump+
- English magazine: NA: Weekly Shonen Jump
- Original run: November 9, 2015 – November 6, 2017
- Volumes: 5

My Hero Academia: Smash!! (Note: Japanese: 僕のヒーローアカデミアすまっしゅ!!, Hepburn: Boku no Hīrō Academia Sumasshu!!) is a Japanese manga series written and illustrated by Hirofumi Neda. It is a spin-off to Kōhei Horikoshi's manga series My Hero Academia. It was serialized on Shueisha's online platform Shōnen Jump+ from November 2015 to November 2017, with its chapters collected in five tankōbon volumes.

== Premise ==
My Hero Academia: Smash!! is a parody of the main series featuring younger, chibi versions of the characters. The manga includes various comedy gags in four-panel comic strips, and the story focuses on the everyday lives from the Class 1-A students (sometimes the villains) and the Pro Heroes of U.A. High School.

== Publication ==
My Hero Academia: Smash!! is written and illustrated by Hirofumi Neda. It was serialized on Shueisha's online platform Shōnen Jump+ from November 9, 2015, to November 6, 2017. Shueisha collected its chapters in five tankōbon volumes, released from April 4, 2016, to November 2, 2017.

In North America, the manga is licensed for English release by Viz Media. The five volumes were published between August 6, 2019, and August 4, 2020.

=== Volumes ===
No.	Original release date	Original ISBN	English release date	English ISBN
1	April 4, 2016	978-4-08-880667-9	August 6, 2019	978-1-9747-0866-6
2	November 4, 2016	978-4-08-880864-2	November 5, 2019	978-1-9747-0867-3
3	June 2, 2017	978-4-08-881116-1	February 4, 2020	978-1-9747-0868-0
4	September 4, 2017	978-4-08-881157-4	May 5, 2020	978-1-9747-0869-7
5	November 2, 2017	978-4-08-881173-4	August 4, 2020	978-1-9747-0870-3

== Reception ==
Brandon Daniel from The Fandom Post praised the series for being a great way to unwind from the more intense moments of the main series.
