= My Hero One's Justice 2 =

2020 video game

- Developer: Byking
- Publisher: Bandai Namco Entertainment
- Series: My Hero Academia
- Engine: Unreal Engine 4
- Platforms: Nintendo Switch; PlayStation 4; Windows; Xbox One; Google Stadia
- Release: NS, PS4, Windows, XBO: JP: March 12, 2020; WW: March 13, 2020; Stadia: WW: February 15, 2022
- Genre: Fighting
- Modes: Single-player, multiplayer

My Hero One's Justice 2, known in Japan as My Hero Academia: One's Justice 2, (Note: Japanese: 僕のヒーローアカデミア One's Justice(ワンズ ジャスティス)2, Hepburn: Boku no Hīrō Akademia Wanzu Jasutisu Tsū) is a 2020 fighting game developed and published by Bandai Namco Entertainment for Nintendo Switch, PlayStation 4, Windows, Xbox One, and Google Stadia. The game is a sequel to My Hero One's Justice and based on the manga series My Hero Academia by Kōhei Horikoshi.

== Production and release ==
A sequel to My Hero One's Justice, it was announced to be in development from Bandai Namco Entertainment in an issue of Weekly Shōnen Jump in September 2019. The game was released in Japan for Nintendo Switch, PlayStation 4, Windows, and Xbox One on March 12, 2020. It was released internationally on the same platforms the next day. On February 15, 2022, the game was released on Google Stadia.

Various characters have been added to the game after its release via paid downloadable content, with the first being Hawks. In June 2020, English voice-overs were added via a free update.

== Reception ==
Reception

Aggregate scores
Aggregator	Score
Metacritic	(PS4) 68/100 (NS) 65/100 (XBO) 65/100 (PC) 68/100
OpenCritic	35% recommend

Review scores
Publication	Score
Famitsu	33/40
Hardcore Gamer	3.5/5
IGN	6/10
Jeuxvideo.com	13/20
Nintendo Life	7/10
The Games Machine (Italy)	7/10
Digitally Downloaded	3.5/5
Screen Rant	4/5

Spencer Still from Screen Rant praised the characters and the combat system, while also noting that the game can be very similar to its predecessor. Suriel Vazquez from IGN praised the characters and their special abilities, while also expressing criticism that the game doesn't pay attention to some of its finer details in the combat system. Jeremy Peeples from Hardcore Gamer praised the visuals and gameplay improvements over the first game, while also criticizing the game as hard to understand for someone not familiar with the main series. Clark A. from Digitally Downloaded also praised the game's characters, humor, and gameplay improvements over the first game, while also criticizing the story mode, stating that it relies too much in the original source. Dom Reseigh-Lincoln from Nintendo Life praised the story mode and customization options, while criticizing the combat and camera controls. Alessandro Alosi from The Games Machine Italy praised the characters and gameplay, but also felt that those who were not fans of the main series had better options for good fighting games. The reviewer for Jeuxvideo.com praised the game's faithfulness to the source material and the large roster of characters, while criticizing the camera and story mode as not easy to understand without knowledge of the main series.

In its first week, the game sold 18,250 units on the Nintendo Switch and 6,375 units on the PlayStation 4, for a total of about 24,625 units.
