= My Hero One's Justice =

2018 video game

- Developer: Byking
- Publisher: Bandai Namco Entertainment
- Series: My Hero Academia
- Engine: Unreal Engine 4
- Platforms: Nintendo Switch; PlayStation 4; Windows; Xbox One
- Release: NS, PS4: JP: August 23, 2018; WW: October 26, 2018; Windows, Xbox One: WW: October 26, 2018
- Genre: Fighting
- Modes: Single-player, multiplayer

My Hero One's Justice, known in Japan as My Hero Academia: One's Justice, (Note: Japanese: 僕のヒーローアカデミア One's Justice(ワンズ ジャスティス), Hepburn: Boku no Hīrō Akademia Wanzu Jasutisu) is a 2018 fighting game developed by Byking and published by Bandai Namco Entertainment for Nintendo Switch, PlayStation 4, Windows, and Xbox One. The game is based on the manga series My Hero Academia by Kōhei Horikoshi.

== Production and release ==
In the first 2018 issue of Shueisha's Weekly Shōnen Jump magazine, it was announced that a video game based on the My Hero Academia franchise was in development from Bandai Namco Entertainment. The game was released on the Nintendo Switch and PlayStation 4 in Japan on August 23, 2018. Internationally, the game was released on the Nintendo Switch, PlayStation 4, Windows, and Xbox One platforms on October 26, 2018.

Endeavor and Shoot-style Izuku Midoriya were given out as a pre-order bonus and later as paid DLC. Inasa Yoarashi was also made available as paid DLC on November 14, 2018.

== Reception ==
Reception

Aggregate scores
Aggregator	Score
Metacritic	(PS4) 68/100 (NS) 70/100 (XBO) 71/100
OpenCritic	26% recommend

Review scores
Publication	Score
Famitsu	31/40
GameRevolution	7/10
GameSpot	6/10
IGN	7/10
Nintendo Life	6/10
Pocket Gamer	3.5/5
Digitally Downloaded	3.5/5
Anime News Network	B

Jordan Ramée from GameSpot praised the characters, controls, and easter eggs to the original source material while criticizing the story mode for requiring knowledge of the source material. Alex Santa Maria from GameRevolution praised the presentation, online play, and representation of the anime series, while also criticizing the AI, camera, and fighting system. Clark A. from Digitally Downloaded praised the game's presentation and gameplay, though felt some of the main series' aspects were lost. Mitchell Saltzman from IGN praised the action and visuals, though also criticizing the game's combat and story mode. Dave Aubrey from Pocket Gamer praised the graphics and the beginning of the game, though Aubrey felt it got repetitive after a few hours of play. Dom Reseigh-Lincoln from Nintendo Life praised the visuals and presentation, while criticizing the gameplay as missed potential. Richard Eisenbeis from Anime News Network praised the "if" stories, while criticizing the online play as laggy and the character roster as unbalanced.

In its first week, the game sold 24,626 units on the Nintendo Switch and 16,036 units on the PlayStation 4, for a total of 40,652. In January 2019, it was announced the game had shipped over 500,000 copies.

== Sequel ==
A sequel, titled My Hero One's Justice 2, was announced in an issue of Weekly Shōnen Jump in September 2019. It was released in Japan for Microsoft Windows, Nintendo Switch, PlayStation 4, and Xbox One on March 12, 2020. It was released internationally on the same platforms the next day.
