= Weekly Shonen Jump (American magazine) =

American digital manga anthology

- The first issue under the title Weekly Shonen Jump, featuring Naruto Uzumaki
- Categories: Shōnen manga
- Frequency: Weekly
- First issue: January 30, 2012; 14 years ago
- Final issue: December 10, 2018; 7 years ago
- Company: Viz Media
- Country: United States; Canada
- Based in: San Francisco
- Language: English
- Website: www.shonenjump.com

Weekly Shonen Jump was a digital shōnen manga anthology published in North America by Viz Media, and the successor to their monthly print anthology Shonen Jump. It began serialization on January 30, 2012, as Weekly Shonen Jump Alpha (officially stylized as Weekly SHONEN JUMP αlpha or Weekly SHONEN JUMP Alpha), with two free preview issues published in the buildup to its launch. Based on Shueisha's popular Japanese magazine of the same name, Weekly Shonen Jump was an attempt to provide English-speaking readers with easily accessible, affordable, and officially licensed editions of the latest installments of popular Shōnen Jump manga soon after their publication in Japan, as an alternative to popular bootleg scanlation services which were illegal and often poorly translated. It was modeled after the Japanese magazine.

The anthology launched with a lineup of six titles, with new issues published online two weeks after the equivalent Japanese release. At the time of its cancellation, the magazine featured twelve titles, including installments of monthly series from the Japanese magazine's sister publications, Weekly Young Jump, Jump SQ, V Jump, and Young Jump Web Comics. At New York Comic Con 2012 it was announced that the magazine would transition to simultaneous publication with Japan beginning with the January 21, 2013, issue, with more new series to be added to the lineup. The magazine was renamed Weekly Shonen Jump starting on January 21, 2013.

Viz Media published its final digital issue of Weekly Shonen Jump and launched the Shonen Jump digital vault on December 10, 2018, providing access to a limited number of free digital chapters and a subscription service to access their back catalogue of Shonen Jump titles. A global version of Shonen Jump+ was also launched on January 28, 2019, called MANGA Plus by Shueisha.

== History ==
In October 2011, Viz confirmed that Weekly Shonen Jump Alpha, a weekly digital version of the magazine, would be released on January 30, 2012. Viz also confirmed that it would release its final Shonen Jump print publication in March of that year after Weekly Shonen Jump Alpha is released.

On January 11, 2012, two free preview issues were published, made available until February 29, 2012. The first, Issue Origins, included the first chapter of each of the six manga to be serialized, while Issue 0 included chapters recently released in Japan, to help readers catch-up.

In Summer 2012, Bakuman became the first title of the original Alpha lineup to finish serialization, and the magazine began featuring installments of ongoing monthly titles from Jump SQ and V Jump, as well as a number of new series fresh from their debut in Weekly Shōnen Jump, including Barrage, Cross Manage, and Takama-Ga-Hara. In October 2012, Viz released the first "Starter Pack," a free, 300+ page preview containing recent chapters of all the titles currently serialized in the magazine.

On January 21, 2013, the magazine was renamed Weekly Shonen Jump and began simultaneous publication with Japanese editions of Weekly Shōnen Jump. The layout and graphic design of the magazine was changed, and a new website was launched at shonenjump.com. The transition also brought with it the announcement of several new series, including a full-color reprinting of Dragon Ball, the superhero webmanga One-Punch Man, and the debut of a new Weekly Shōnen Jump sci-fi series, World Trigger.

On July 4, 2013, the magazine went international, becoming available for purchase in the United Kingdom, Ireland, Australia, New Zealand and South Africa.

In January 2014, Weekly Shonen Jump returned to print via the Jump Pack, a quarterly print sampler that includes a three-month subscription to the digital magazine and a promotional Yu-Gi-Oh! card.

In August 2014, a new "Jump Start" feature was announced, whereby all new series debuting in the Japanese edition of Weekly Shōnen Jump will have at their first three chapters published in the English Weekly Shonen Jump. A variety of factors including continued Japanese serialization and English audience reception will then help to determine if the series is picked up for full serialization in the English magazine.

On June 29, 2016, the magazine expands its availability, becoming available for purchase in India, the Philippines and Singapore.

On December 10, 2018, Viz Media published its final digital issue of Weekly Shonen Jump in favor of new chapters being released for free with an app and a subscription service to access their back catalogue.

== Features ==
Weekly Shonen Jump Alpha's first issue, published January 30, 2012

Issues of Weekly Shonen Jump ranged from 100 to 393 pages, depending on the titles and special features appearing in any given week, and were available to read online or on web-enabled devices via Viz's official website or through the official app. Readers could sign up for an annual subscription or purchase individual issues.

The format of the magazine generally mirrored that of the equivalent issue of the Japanese magazine, typically featuring the same cover illustrations, as well as color interior pages and the ordering of series on the table of contents by popularity, as determined by weekly reader polls in Japan.

Issues frequently contained additional features such as exclusive creator interviews and manga specials (including one-shots, crossovers, and full-color chapters). Likewise, the official website offered articles, wallpapers, chapter previews, sketch videos, and a variety of other special features. Annual subscribers who registered their mailing address would also periodically receive free promotional Yu-Gi-Oh! cards through the mail, as well as a free "yearbook" each December, which included exclusive one-shot manga specials, posters, interviews, and other features.

== Series ==
=== Running in the magazine at the time of its cancellation ===
Title	Creator(s)	First issue	Last issue
Black Clover (Weekly Shōnen Jump)	Yūki Tabata	February 16, 2015 (Chapter #1)	Ongoing
Blue Exorcist (Jump Square)	Kazue Kato	July 30, 2012 (Chapter #33)	Ongoing
Boruto: Naruto Next Generations (Weekly Shōnen Jump)	Masashi Kishimoto, Mikio Ikemoto, Ukyō Kodachi	May 9, 2016 (Chapter #1)	Ongoing
Chainsaw Man (Weekly Shōnen Jump)	Tatsuki Fujimoto	December 3, 2018 (Chapter #1)	Ongoing
Dr. Stone (Weekly Shōnen Jump)	Riichiro Inagaki, Boichi	March 6, 2017 (Chapter #1)	Ongoing
Food Wars!: Shokugeki no Soma (Weekly Shōnen Jump)	Yuto Tsukuda, Shun Saeki, Yuki Morisaki	November 3, 2014 (Chapter #93)	Ongoing
Hunter × Hunter (Weekly Shōnen Jump)	Yoshihiro Togashi	June 2, 2014 (Chapter #341)	Ongoing
My Hero Academia (Weekly Shōnen Jump)	Kōhei Horikoshi	February 9, 2015 (Chapter #29)	Ongoing
ne0;lation (Weekly Shōnen Jump)	Tomohide Hirao, Mizuki Yoda	December 10, 2018 (Chapter #1)	Ongoing
One Piece (Weekly Shōnen Jump)	Eiichiro Oda	January 30, 2012 (Chapter #652)	Ongoing
One-Punch Man (Tonari no Young Jump)	One, Yusuke Murata	January 21, 2013 (Chapter #1)	Ongoing
The Promised Neverland (Weekly Shōnen Jump)	Kaiu Shirai, Posuka Demizu	August 1, 2016 (Chapter #1)	Ongoing
RWBY The Official Manga	Monty Oum, Rooster Teeth, Bunta Kinami	November 19, 2018 (Chapter #1)	Ongoing
Seraph of the End: Vampire Reign (Jump Square)	Takaya Kagami, Yamato Yamamoto, Daisuke Furuya	October 7, 2013 (Chapter #1)	Ongoing
We Never Learn (Weekly Shōnen Jump)	Taishi Tsutsui	February 6, 2017 (Chapter #1)	Ongoing
World Trigger (Weekly Shōnen Jump, Jump Square)	Daisuke Ashihara	February 11, 2013 (Chapter #1)	Ongoing
Yu-Gi-Oh! Arc-V (V Jump)	Shin Yoshida, Naohito Miyoshi	August 24, 2015 (Chapter #1)	Ongoing

=== Completed series ===
Title	Creator(s)	First issue	Last issue
All You Need Is Kill (Weekly Young Jump)	Hiroshi Sakurazaka, Takeshi Obata, Ryōsuke Takeuchi, Yoshitoshi Abe	January 11, 2014 (Chapter #1)	June 2, 2014 (Chapter #17)
Bakuman (Weekly Shōnen Jump)	Tsugumi Ohba, Takeshi Obata	January 30, 2012 (Chapter #162)	May 7, 2012 (Chapter #176)
Barrage (Weekly Shōnen Jump)	Kōhei Horikoshi	June 4, 2012 (Chapter #1)	September 24, 2012 (Chapter #16)
Bleach (Weekly Shōnen Jump)	Tite Kubo	January 30, 2012 (Chapter #479)	August 22, 2016 (Chapter #686)
Cross Manage (Weekly Shōnen Jump)	Kaito	October 1, 2012 (Chapter #1)	July 22, 2013 (Chapter #42)
Dragon Ball Full Color (Jump Comics)	Akira Toriyama	February 4, 2013 (Chapter #195 / #1)	February 17, 2014 (Chapter #245 / #51)
Hi-Fi Cluster (Weekly Shōnen Jump)	Ippei Goto	September 15, 2014 (Chapter #1)	January 26, 2015 (Chapter #18)
Jaco the Galactic Patrolman (Weekly Shōnen Jump)	Akira Toriyama	July 15, 2013 (Chapter #1)	September 30, 2013 (Chapter #11)
Love Rush! (Weekly Shōnen Jump)	Ryōhei Yamamoto	August 22, 2016 (Chapter #1)	November 14, 2016 (Chapter #13)
Naruto (Weekly Shōnen Jump)	Masashi Kishimoto	January 30, 2012 (Chapter #569)	November 10, 2014 (Chapter #700)
Naruto: The Seventh Hokage and the Scarlet Spring (Weekly Shōnen Jump)	Masashi Kishimoto	April 27, 2015 (Chapter #700+1)	July 6, 2015 (Chapter #700+10)
Nisekoi: False Love (Weekly Shōnen Jump)	Naoshi Komi	November 26, 2012 (Chapter #49)	August 8, 2016 (Chapter #229)
Nura: Rise of the Yokai Clan (Weekly Shōnen Jump)	Hiroshi Shiibashi	January 30, 2012 (Chapter #185)	January 14, 2013 (Chapter #210)
Red Sprite (Weekly Shōnen Jump)	Tomohiro Yagi	August 29, 2016 (Chapter #1)	November 28, 2016 (Chapter #14)
ROBOT×LASERBEAM (Weekly Shōnen Jump)	Tadatoshi Fujimaki	March 20, 2017 (Chapter #1)	June 25, 2018 (Chapter #62)
Rurouni Kenshin: Restoration (Jump Square)	Nobuhiro Watsuki	May 21, 2012 (Chapter #1)	June 10, 2013 (Chapter #10)
Rurouni Kenshin: The Hokkaido Arc (Jump Square)	Nobuhiro Watsuki, Kaworu Kurosaki	September 4, 2017 (Chapter #1)	November 6, 2017 (Chapter #3) (Removed from magazine)
RWBY (Ultra Jump)	Monty Oum, Rooster Teeth, Shirow Miwa	October 31, 2016 (Chapter #1)	February 27, 2017 (Chapter #15)
School Judgement: Gakkyu Hotei (Weekly Shōnen Jump, Shōnen Jump+)	Nobuaki Enoki, Takeshi Obata	December 1, 2014 (Chapter #1)	June 8, 2015 (Finale Chapter)
Stealth Symphony (Weekly Shōnen Jump)	Ryohgo Narita, Yoichi Amano	February 24, 2014 (Chapter #1)	July 14, 2014 (Chapter #20)
Takama-ga-hara (Weekly Shōnen Jump)	Jyūuzōu Kawai	July 23, 2012 (Chapter #1)	November 19, 2012 (Chapter #17)
The Comiq (Weekly Shōnen Jump)	Kazuki Takahashi	October 15, 2018 (Chapter #1)	November 26, 2018 (Chapter #7)
Toriko (Weekly Shōnen Jump)	Mitsutoshi Shimabukuro	January 30, 2012 (Chapter #171)	November 21, 2016 (Chapter #396)
Yu-Gi-Oh! Zexal (V Jump)	Shin Yoshida, Naohito Miyoshi	July 9, 2012 (Chapter #19)	June 22, 2015 (Chapter #55)

=== Jump Start series ===
Beginning in September 2014, the "Jump Start initiative" was started with the goal of previewing the first three issues of all new manga debuting in the Japanese magazine, with the potential for full serialization in the English magazine if various criteria are met.

Title	Creator(s)	First issue	Last issue
Act-Age (Weekly Shōnen Jump)	Tatsuya Matsuki, Shiro Usazaki	January 22, 2018 (Chapter #1)	February 5, 2018 (Chapter #3)
Alice & Taiyo (Weekly Shōnen Jump)	Takahide Totsuno	July 2, 2018 (Chapter #1)	July 16, 2018 (Chapter #3)
Amalgam of Distortion (Weekly Shōnen Jump)	Ryo Ishiyama	October 10, 2016 (Chapter #1)	October 24, 2016 (Chapter #3)
Best Blue (Weekly Shōnen Jump)	Masahiro Hirakata	July 13, 2015 (Chapter #1)	July 27, 2015 (Chapter #3)
Boys Over Flowers Season 2 (Shōnen Jump+)	Yoko Kamio	February 16, 2015 (Chapter #1)	March 30, 2015 (Chapter #4)
BOZEBEATS (Weekly Shōnen Jump)	Ryoji Hirano	January 15, 2018 (Chapter #1)	January 29, 2018 (Chapter #3)
Buddy Strike (Weekly Shōnen Jump)	Kaito	November 16, 2015 (Chapter #1)	November 30, 2015 (Chapter #3)
Bye-Bye, Humanity (Shōnen Jump+)	Tsunezo Watanabe, Asami Hagiwara	February 29, 2016 (Chapter #1)	February 29, 2016 (Chapter #1)
Cross Account (Weekly Shōnen Jump)	Tsunehiro Date	June 19, 2017 (Chapter #1)	July 3, 2017 (Chapter #3)
Cyborg Roggy (Weekly Shōnen Jump)	Yu Miki	February 23, 2015 (Chapter #1)	March 9, 2015 (Chapter #3)
Demon Prince Poro's Diaries (Weekly Shōnen Jump)	Hitsuji Gondaira	February 20, 2017 (Chapter #1)	March 6, 2017 (Chapter #3)
Demon Slayer: Kimetsu no Yaiba (Weekly Shōnen Jump)	Koyoharu Gotouge	February 15, 2016 (Chapter #1)	February 29, 2016 (Chapter #3)
Demon's Plan (Weekly Shōnen Jump)	Yoshimichi Okamoto	November 21, 2016 (Chapter #1)	December 5, 2016 (Chapter #3)
Devilyman (Weekly Shōnen Jump)	Kentaro Fukuda	May 25, 2015 (Chapter #1)	June 8, 2015 (Chapter #3)
ēlDLIVE (Jump Live, Shōnen Jump+)	Akira Amano	September 29, 2014 (Chapter #1)	October 20, 2014 (Chapter #3)
E-ROBOT (Weekly Shōnen Jump)	Ryōhei Yamamoto	November 24, 2014 (Chapter #1)	December 8, 2014 (Chapter #3)
Full Drive (Weekly Shōnen Jump)	Genki Ono	October 23, 2017 (Chapter #1)	November 6, 2017 (Chapter #3)
Golem Hearts (Weekly Shōnen Jump)	Gen Osuka	October 30, 2017 (Chapter #1)	November 13, 2017 (Chapter #3)
Hungry Marie (Weekly Shōnen Jump)	Ryuhei Tamura	February 27, 2017 (Chapter #1)	March 13, 2017 (Chapter #3)
I'm from Japan (Weekly Shōnen Jump)	Seiji Hayashi	September 17, 2018 (Chapter #1)	October 1, 2018 (Chapter #3)
Invade You! (Weekly Shōnen Jump)	Kazusa Inaoka	May 21, 2018 (Chapter #1)	June 4, 2018 (Chapter #3)
Judos (Weekly Shōnen Jump)	Shinsuke Kondo	September 8, 2014 (Chapter #1)	September 22, 2014 (Chapter #3)
Jujutsu Kaisen (Weekly Shōnen Jump)	Gege Akutami	March 5, 2018 (Chapter #1)	March 19, 2018 (Chapter #3)
Kagamigami (Weekly Shōnen Jump)	Toshiaki Iwashiro	February 9, 2015 (Chapter #1)	February 23, 2015 (Chapter #3)
Lycopene the Tomatoy Poodle (Weekly Shōnen Jump)	Koji Oishi	October 9, 2017 (Chapter #1)	October 23, 2017 (Chapter #3)
Momiji no Kisetsu (Weekly Shōnen Jump)	Masayoshi Satosho	May 14, 2018 (Chapter #1)	May 28, 2018 (Chapter #3)
Mononofu (Weekly Shōnen Jump)	Haruto Ikezawa, Takanori Hashimoto	September 14, 2015 (Chapter #1)	September 28, 2015 (Chapter #3)
Noah's Notes (Weekly Shōnen Jump)	Haruto Ikezawa	March 12, 2018 (Chapter #1)	March 26, 2018 (Chapter #3)
Ole Golazo (Weekly Shōnen Jump)	Takamasa Moue	November 28, 2016 (Chapter #1)	December 12, 2016 (Chapter #3)
Samon the Summoner (Weekly Shōnen Jump)	Shun Numa	September 21, 2015 (Chapter #1)	October 5, 2015 (Chapter #3)
Seiji Tanaka Secretary to the Managing President, General Time Industries (Weekly Shōnen Jump)	Keiji Amatsuka	June 25, 2018 (Chapter #1)	July 9, 2018 (Chapter #3)
SHUDAN! (Weekly Shōnen Jump)	Takuma Yokota	June 12, 2017 (Chapter #1)	June 26, 2017 (Chapter #3)
Sporting Salt (Weekly Shōnen Jump)	Yuto Kubota	September 22, 2014 (Chapter #1)	October 6, 2014 (Chapter #3)
Spring Weapon No. 01 (Weekly Shōnen Jump)	Tomohiro Hasegawa	October 17, 2016 (Chapter #1)	October 31, 2016 (Chapter #3)
Straighten Up! Welcome to Shika High's Competitive Dance Club (Weekly Shōnen Jump)	Takuma Yokota	May 11, 2015 (Chapter #1)	May 25, 2015 (Chapter #3)
Takuan and Batsu's Daily Demon Diary (Weekly Shōnen Jump)	Kentaro Itani	May 16, 2016 (Chapter #1)	May 30, 2016 (Chapter #3)
Takujo no AGEHA: The Table Tennis of AGEHA (Weekly Shōnen Jump)	Itsuki Furuya	November 17, 2014 (Chapter #1)	December 1, 2014 (Chapter #3)
Teenage Renaissance! David (Weekly Shōnen Jump)	Yushin Kuroki	September 17, 2018 (Chapter #1)	October 1, 2018 (Chapter #3)
U19 (Weekly Shōnen Jump)	Yuji Kimura	February 13, 2017 (Chapter #1)	February 27, 2017 (Chapter #3)
Ultra Battle Satellite (Weekly Shōnen Jump)	Yusuke Utsumi	March 2, 2015 (Chapter #1)	March 16, 2015 (Chapter #3)
Ziga (Weekly Shōnen Jump)	Rokuro Sano, Kentaro Hidano	March 19, 2018 (Chapter #1)	April 2, 2018 (Chapter #3)

=== Specials ===
- One Piece x Toriko: Taste of the Devil Fruit by Eiichiro Oda and Mitsutoshi Shimabukuro - A one-shot crossover between One Piece and Toriko, available for free to annual subscribers who signed up before April 30, 2012.
- Naruto, "Movie 6: Road to Naruto the Movie" by Masashi Kishimoto - A special one-shot tie-in for the ninth Naruto film, Road to Ninja: Naruto the Movie, included in the August 6, 2012, issue of Weekly Shonen Jump Alpha.
- Nura: Rise of the Yokai Clan, "Aoi Spiral Castle: The Final Battle (Act 1)" by Hiroshi Shiibashi - A full-color 64-page chapter published in a free, special issue of Weekly Shonen Jump Alpha on August 27, 2012, to commemorate the Obon holiday.
- Nura: Rise of the Yokai Clan, "Aoi Spiral Castle: The Final Battle (Act 2)" by Hiroshi Shiibashi - A full-color 63-page chapter published in the October 29, 2012, issue of Weekly Shonen Jump Alpha.
- Otter No.11 by Tsugumi Ohba and Takeshi Obata - A spin-off one-shot from the series Bakuman, published in the free SJ Alpha Yearbook 2013, mailed out to annual subscribers in December 2012.
- Sachie-chan Good!! by Akira Toriyama and Masakazu Katsura - A one-shot manga written by Akira Toriyama and illustrated by Masakazu Katsura, originally published in Jump SQ in 2008. It was published in the free SJ Alpha Yearbook 2013, mailed out to annual subscribers in December 2012.
- Hunter × Hunter: Kurapika's Memories by Yoshihiro Togashi - A 63-page one-shot split into two parts detailing Kurapika's origins which acts as a prequel to the Hunter × Hunter: Phantom Rouge film. Part one was included in the December 17, 2012, issue and part two was included in the December 24, 2012, issue.
- Nura: Rise of the Yokai Clan, "Aoi Spiral Castle: The Final Battle (Act 3)" by Hiroshi Shiibashi - A full-color 63-page chapter published in the January 14, 2013, issue of Weekly Shonen Jump Alpha.
- Kintoki by Akira Toriyama - A one-shot manga originally published in Weekly Shōnen Jump in 2010 as part of the "Top of the Super Legend" project, a series of six one-shot manga by famed Jump artists. It was published in the January 28, 2013, issue of Weekly Shonen Jump.
- Naruto: A Digital Retrospective by Masashi Kishimoto - A free digital artbook containing a cover gallery with the artwork for the first 60 volumes of Naruto, a small collection of color spreads, and chapter 624. It was available from May 30 to April 1, 2013. A revised version with more artwork and the original Naruto one-shot pilot was published as a special bonus issue of Weekly Shonen Jump on August 19, 2013, to commemorate the Obon holiday.
- Sakuran (Tentative) by Toshiaki Iwashiro - A one-shot manga published day and date with the Japanese Weekly Shōnen Jump on April 1, 2013.
- Mario by Masashi Kishimoto - A one-shot manga originally published in Jump SQ 2013 No. 6 on May 2, 2013, and published in Weekly Shonen Jump on May 13, 2013. A four-page prelude to the one-shot was published on April 27, 2013, in the Japanese Weekly Shōnen Jump, and on April 29, 2013, in the North American Weekly Shonen Jump.
- Naruto, "Number 638: Ten Tails' Jinchuriki, Obito" by Masashi Kishimoto and One Piece, "Chapter 714: Lucy and Moocy" by Eichiro Oda - Special full-color versions of these two chapters were published exclusively in Japanese in the premium digital edition of Weekly Shōnen Jump No. 33 on July 13, 2013, and in English in the July 15, 2013, issue of Weekly Shonen Jump, to commemorate the 45th anniversary of Weekly Shōnen Jump.
- Bench by Masashi Kishimoto - A one-shot manga about baseball originally published in Japanese in Weekly Shōnen Jump in 2010 as part of the "Top of the Super Legend" project and in English in the July 29, 2013, issue of Weekly Shonen Jump.
- Naruto by Masashi Kishimoto - The original Naruto one-shot pilot, published in a free, special issue of Weekly Shonen Jump on August 19, 2013, to commemorate the Obon holiday.
- One Piece, "Strong World" by Eiichiro Oda - A special one-shot tie-in for the 10th One Piece film, Strong World, included in the September 2, 2013, issue of Weekly Shonen Jump.
- Cross Manage, "Special Bonus Chapter" by KAITO - A special one-shot bonus chapter showing what happened between Sakurai and Misora during their summer training camp, published in the October 21, 2013, issue of Weekly Shonen Jump.
- One Piece: A Digital Retrospective by Eiichiro Oda - A free digital artbook containing an interview, a cover gallery with the artwork for the first 69 volumes of One Piece, a small collection of color spreads, and the special one-shot chapter "Strong World." It was available from November 21 to 27, 2013.
- El Viento Del Norte by Niu Zai (牛 仔 Niú Zǎi) - A one-shot Taiwanese manga about a katana-wielding cowgirl that was entered in the Shonen Jump Manga Competition and was voted most popular by American audiences. It was published in the January 27, 2014, issue of Weekly Shonen Jump.
- The Team Before Daybreak by Yu YanShu - A Chinese one-shot about a vampire participating in World War II; it was the most popular entry for the Shonen Jump Manga Competition in both Japan and China, and was printed in the January 27, 2014, issue of each country's respective Shonen Jump.
- Dragon Ball Minus: Departure of the Fated Child by Akira Toriyama - A prequel story to both Dragon Ball and Jaco the Galactic Patrolman, originally included in the collected volume of Jaco. Published in the May 7, 2014, issue of Weekly Shonen Jump.
- Nisekoi x My Love Story!! by Naoshi Komi and Kazune Kawahara - A crossover two-shot between Nisekoi and Ore Monogatari!!, the first part published in the June 16, 2014, issue of Weekly Shonen Jump and the second part on June 30 issue. Also included in the June 16 issue was the first chapter of Ore Monogatari!!.
- Rurouni Kenshin: Master of Flame by Nobuhiro Watsuki - A two-part Rurouni Kenshin side-story about Himura Kenshin's rival, Shishio Makoto. The two parts were published in the July 14, 2014, and September 15, 2014, issues of Weekly Shonen Jump.
- Shikigami: Twilight Days by Toshiaki Iwashiro - A one-shot manga by the author of Psyren published in the July 28, 2014, issue of Weekly Shonen Jump.
- Astronerd by Kazue Kato - A one-shot manga by the author of Blue Exorcist published in the August 11, 2014, issue of Weekly Shonen Jump.
- Tegami Bachi, Chapter 1: "Letter and Letter Bee" by Hiroyuki Asada - Published in a free, special "Tegami Bachi Spotlight" issue on August 18, 2014, to commemorate the Obon Holiday.
- RKD-EK9 by Nisioisin and Takeshi Obata - A one-shot manga published in the December 29, 2014, bonus issue of Weekly Shonen Jump.
- What Can You Kill? by Nisioisin and Akihisa Ikeda - A one-shot manga published on January 12, 2015, bonus issue of Weekly Shonen Jump.
- The Right Way to Make Jump! by Takeshi Sakurai - A special manga feature published in the May 4, 2015, bonus issue of Weekly Shonen Jump presenting the series' three-part The Right Way to Make Jump in English! story arc, spanning chapters 27–29, which were originally published in Japanese on Shueisha's Shonen Jump+ platform from April 20 through May 4, 2015.
- Naruto: The Path Lit by the Full Moon by Masashi Kishimoto - A one-shot about Mitsuki and Orochimaru, acting as a precursor to the upcoming Boruto: Naruto Next Generations series. Published in the April 25, 2016, issue of Weekly Shonen Jump.
