= List of Psyren chapters =

The chapters of the Japanese manga series Psyren are written and illustrated by Toshiaki Iwashiro. It is published in Japan by Shueisha, and has been serialized in the shōnen manga magazine Weekly Shōnen Jump since the 3 December 2007 issue. Publication is completed, with serial chapters having been collected into sixteen tankōbon volumes. The series is about the adventures of a high school student named Ageha Yoshina, who learns to develop his psychic abilities after being transported to a world named Psyren. On October 4, 2011, the first volume of Psyren was released in the US by Viz Media's Shonen Jump.

== Volumes ==
No.	Title	Original release date	English release date
1	Urban Legend; Toshi Densetsu (都市伝説)	May 2, 2008; 978-4-08-874532-9	October 4, 2011; 1421536765
1. "Urban Legend" (都市伝説, "Toshi Densetsu"); 2. "Paradise" (楽園, "Rakuen"); 3. "Danger Zone" (警戒区域, "Keikai Kuiki"); 4. "Alfred the Taboo" (禁人種のAlfred, "Tavū no Arufuredo"); 5. "Scenery" (光景, "Kōkei"); 6. "The Will to Survive" (生存力, "Seizonryoku"); 7. "The Return" (帰還, "Kikan")
An occurrence of people's disappearances in the world is attributed to an urban legend called Psyren. Ageha Yoshina receives a Psyren calling card from a cloaked figure, dubbed as Nemesis Q, and uses it to search for his missing classmate Sakurako Amamiya. Several others, including Ageha, who received the card are sent to a desolated world filled with monsters called Taboo. There, Ageha finds Sakurako and is reunited with a childhood friend named Hiryu Asaga. He learns that Nemesis Q has arranged a goal post for the participants which will send them back home.
2	Baby Universe; Bebī Yunibāsu (ベビーユニバース)	July 4, 2008; 978-4-08-874546-6	January 3, 2012; 1421536773
8. "The Escort" (迎えの者, "Mukae no Mono"); 9. "Various Circumstances" (それぞれの事情, "Sorezore no Jijō"); 10. "Matsuri's Story" (マツリの話, "Matsuri no Hanashi"); 11. "Baby Universe" (ベビーユニバース, "Bebī Yunibāsu"); 12. "Her Place" (彼女の部屋, "Kanojo no Heya"); 13. "The Q Question" (Q「Q」, " Kuesuchon Kyū"); 14. "Reunion" (再召集, "Saishōshū"); 15. "The Gathered" (集いし者達, "Tsudoishimono-tachi"); 16. "Man-Eating Worm" (大喰らいの蟲, "Ōgurai no Wāmu")
After most of the survivors were killed, Ageha and his friends are able to reach the goal and return home safely. They are then introduced to Matsuri Yagumo, Sakurako's trainer and a previous participant of Psyren, who reveals that the world they sent to is future Japan and trains them to use their psychic abilities, dubbed as Psi, which was awakened during their exposure to the future's atmosphere. Elsewhere on live TV, a movie star named Oboro Mochizuki attempts to reveal his knowledge of Psyren but is put into cardiac arrest by Nemesis Q's powers; he is saved by Elmore Tenjuin, an elderly woman offering a reward on information on Psyren. Soon after, Nemesis Q sends all its participants back to the future where they are attacked by a giant worm Taboo.
3	Dragon; Ryū (龍)	October 3, 2008; 978-4-08-874580-0	March 6, 2012; 1421536781
17. "Tatsuo" (タツオ); 18. "My Turn" (自分の番, "Jibun no Ban"); 19. "A Girl, The Taboo, and the Broken Heart" (少女と禁人種と壊れた心, "Shōjo to Tavū to Kowareta Kokoro"); 20. "Operation" (作戦, "Sakusen"); 21. "Bait" (囮, "Otori"); 22. "Dragon" (龍, "Ryū"); 23. "Destruction" (破壊, "Hakai"); 24. "Revival" (再起, "Saiki"); 25. "I'll Find a Way Home" (必ず帰る, "Kanarazu Kaeru")
Aside from the giant monster, they are snipped by a mind controlled Tatsuo Mana, a friend of Hiryu who went missing prior to the series. Hiryu attempts to call upon Tatsuo's mind but is mortally wounded as a result. Ageha, using his new found abilities, destroys Tatsuo's mind control device but is brain damaged due to overexertion. Oboro uses his newly awakened abilities to heal the two and save their lives. With Tatsuo's help, the group are able to reach the goal and return home.
4	Melzez Door; Meruzezu Doa (暴王の月)	January 5, 2009; 978-4-08-874620-3	May 1, 2012; 142153679X
26. "Back" (前へ, "Mae e"); 27. "Enhance" (ライズ, "Raizu"); 28. "Melzez Door" (暴王の月, "Meruzezu Doa"); 29. Elmore Wood's Children (エルモア·ウッドの子供達, Euromoa Uddo no Kodomo-tachi); 30. "Fascinating Child's Play" (魅惑なる児戯, "Miwakunaru Jigi"); 31. "Training Camp" (合宿, "Gasshuku"); 32. "The Third Journey" (三度目の旅立ち, "Sandome no Tabidachi"); 33. "Treasure Shelter" (宝箱, "Sherutā"); 34. "Legacy News" (遺産, "Nyūsu"); 35. "Bud of Destruction" (滅亡の芽, "Metsubō no Me")
Matsuri has her friend, Kagetora Hyodo, train the group to use their psi to enhance their physical abilities during battle; Ageha also receives training to control his unique psi ability, dubbed as Melzez Door. Later, Oboro invites the group to visit Elmore and adopted children: Van, Kyle, Mari, Frederica, and Shao. There, Ageha learns from the children tricks to control Melzez Door. Nemesis Q then summons the group for their next journey where their teammate, Kabuto Kirisaki, takes them to his uncle's shelter in order to forge for information. They find a DVD and learn that a year from their time, a group named WISE will appear and destroy the world.
5	Visions; Mugen (夢幻)	March 4, 2009; 978-4-08-874654-8	July 3, 2012; 1421536803
36. "Uprising" (蜂起, "Ketsui"); 37. "W.I.S.E" (W.I.S.E, "Doruki"); 38. "Escape" (散, "Esukeipu"); 39. "Trance" (鎌, "Toransu"); 40. "Experiment" (実験, "Jikken"); 41. "Visions" (幻視, "Vijonzu"); 42. "Program" (新型, "Puroguramu"); 43. "Melzez vs. Explosure" (暴王VS爆塵者, " Meruzezu VS Ikusupurojia"); 44. "Star Commander" (星将, "Seishō")
The group is then confronted by a Dholki, a member of WISE, along with his Taboos. The group manages to kill the Taboos while Dholki is saved by another WISE member codenamed Shiner; the group then returns home.
6	Flame; Fureimu (突入作戦)	June 4, 2009; 978-4-08-874682-1	September 4, 2012; 1421536811
45. "Summer Sky" (夏空, "Natsuzora"); 46. "Gag Rule" (緘口令, "Kankōrei"); 47. "Q" (Q, "KYŪ"); 48. "Threesome" (三人組, "San'ningumi"); 49. "Graffiti" (落書き, "Rakugaki"); 50. "Flame" (突入作戦, "Fureimu"); 51. "Pyro Queen" (炎, "Pairo Kuīn"); 52. "The Mind's Eye" (心眼, "Shingan"); 53. "Pain" (痛み, "Itami")
Ageha attempts to warn Elmore and her children about their deaths due to WISE but is stopped by Nemesis Q. Meanwhile, Kagetora deals with a three-man-group consisting of Kyotada Inui, Lan Shinonome, and Haruhiko Yumeji who have been using their psi abilities to steal. Kagetori is outmaneuvered and captured by them instead. Ageha and Elmore's children mount a rescue and defeat the criminals.
7	The December 2nd Revolution; Kaihen: Jūnigatsu Futsuka (改変・12月2日)	August 4, 2009; 978-4-08-874716-3	November 6, 2012; 142153682X
54. "Brothers" (兄弟, "Kyōdai"); 55. "Miroku" (ミロク); 56. "Hospital" (病院にて, "Byōin ni te"); 57. "The December 2nd Revolution" (改変・12月2日, "Kaihen: Jūnigatsu Futsuka"); 58. "The December 2nd Revolution Part II" (改変・12月2日②, "Kaihen: Jūnigatsu Futsuka Ni"); 59. "Lost" (消失, "Shōshitsu"); 60. "Heart of Stone" (心を捨てれば, "Kokoro o Sutereba"); 61. "The Invitation" (招待, "Shōtai"); 62. "Mutual Destruction" (相殺, "Sōsai")
It is revealed Kyotada was manipulated by WISE's leader, Miroku Amagi, who leaves after revealing his identity. Afterwards, Lan and Haruhiko reveal they needed money to pay for the medical fees of Lan's sister, Chika Shinonome; Kagetora then calls the healer Ian, who heals Chika. Meanwhile, the DVD containing WISE's public attack has its contents changed, meaning the group's actions are changing the future. The DVD reveals more information regarding Elmore's death and the group travel to the airport to prevent it. Nemesis Q sends them back to the future where the group is confronted by Dholki and Shiner.
8	Light; Hikari (光)	November 4, 2009; 978-4-08-874737-8	January 1, 2013; 1421543362
63. "Despair" (絶望的, "Zetsubōteki"); 64. "Light" (光, "Hikari"); 65. "Elmore Wood" (エルモア·ウッド, "Eurumoa Uddo"); 66. "Warriors" (戦士, "Senshi"); 67. "The Root" (根, "Rūto"); 68. "Rebirthday I" (転生の日①, "Tensei no Hi (ichi)"); 69. "Rebirthday II" (転生の日②, "Tensei no Hi (ni)"); 70. "Rebirthday III" (転生の日③, "Tensei no Hi (san)"); 71. "SOS"
The group becomes separated and overpowered but are saved by Elmore's children who are now teenagers. With Dohlki dead and Shiner forced to retreat, Ageha, Sakurako, and Kabuto return with the children to their base. There, they learn Elmore has organized a survivor's group dubbed Tenju's Roots and are informed of the events that occur between the present and future. Afterwards, they are greeted by Nemesis Q who reveals his master is dying.
9	The Living Island; Ikeru Shima (生ける島)	January 4, 2010; 978-4-08-874766-8	March 5, 2013; 1421543370
72. "Dreameater Island" (夢喰島へ, "Mukurojima e"); 73. "False Empire" (偽帝, "Gitei"); 74. "Brain Beast" (脳獣, "Burein Bīsuto"); 75. "The Living Island" (生ける島, "Ikeru Shima"); 76. "Home" (家, "Hōmu"); 77. "Cycle" (円, "En"); 78. "Cage" (檻, "Kēji"); 79. "Left Hand" (左手, "Hidarite"); 80. "Smile" (微笑, "Bishō")
A false prophet named Usui has located Nemesis Q and plans to silence her in order to keep his reign of power over a survivor refuge. The protagonists intercept his attempts but his memory erasing attack briefly contacts Sakurako who is seemingly unfazed.
10	Respective Skies; Sorezore no Sora (それぞれの空)	March 4, 2010; 978-4-08-870013-7	May 7, 2013; 1421551446
81. "Meeting" (対面, "Taimen"); 82. "Memory" (記憶, "Kioku"); 83. "Apathy" (無感情, "Mukanjō"); 84. "Hiryu" (飛龍); 85. "Disappearance" (失踪, "Shissō"); 86. "Respective Skies" (それぞれの空, "Sorezore no Sora"); 87. "Family" (家族, "Kazoku"); 88. "Father and Son" (父と子, "Chichi to Ko"); 89. "Amamiya" (雨宮)
The group meets Nemesis Q's master, who is referred to by her experimental number No.7 by a research team called Grigori. She reveals Nemesis Q's creation was to find information on Miroku and reveals the locations of Hiyu and Obororo. Ageha, Sakurako, and Kabuto return to the present where their ten-day disappearance causes the media to aggressive pursue them. To avoid them, Ageha's family and Sakurako stay in Elmore's mansion. Meanwhile, Sakurako struggles to keep her second personality from escaping due to Inui's memory attack. The next day, Kagetora goes to investigate the orphanage where No.7 resided.
11	The Two Test Subjects; Futari no Jikkentai (二人の実験体)	April 30, 2010; 978-4-08-870048-9	July 2, 2013; 1421551454
90. "Harukaze Academy" (はるかぜ学園, "Harukaze Gakuen"); 91. "Riko" (理子); 92. "Demon" (まじん, "Majin"); 93. "#1 Friend" (友達1号, "Tomodachi Ichi-gō"); 94. "The Two Test Subjects" (二人の実験体, "Futari no Jikkentai"); 95. "The Sun" (日輪, "Nichirin"); 96. "The King of Life" (生命の王, "Seimei no Ō"); 97. "The Meteorite Uroboros" (小惑星ウロボロス, "Shōwakusei Uroborosu"); 98. "Grigori's Survivor" (グリゴリの生存者, "Gurigori no Seizonsha")
At the orphanage, WISE member Junas destroys documents relating to Miroku and takes a young girl named Caprico with him. Meanwhile, Miroku challenges Grana to a battle in order to recruit him to WISE. Their battle is caught by the media which Miroku uses to announce his revolution. At the same time, Ageha and Sakurako learn about a sentient asteroid dubbed as Ouroboros by Asuka Yoshina, Ageha's father; there, the news report about Miroku scares a scientist named Kouichi Iba who is revealed to be a former Grigori scientist.
12	Blood and Resolution; Chi to Kakugo (血と覚悟)	July 2, 2010; 978-4-08-870104-2	September 3, 2013; 1421551462
99. "Regret" (後悔, "Kōkai"); 100. "To the Lab" (研究所へ, "Kenkyūjo e"); 101. "Virus" (ウイルス, "Uirusu"); 102. "Poisonous Moth" (毒蛾, "Dokuga"); 103. "Pincer Attack" (挟撃, "Kyōgeki"); 104. "Switch" (交替, "Kōtai"); 105. "Abyss" (深淵, "Abisu"); 106. "Blood and Resolution" (血と覚悟, "Chi to Kakugo"); 107. "Manner of Death" (死に様, "Shi ni Zama")
Kouichi reveals information regarding their Miroku's past as a Grigori test subject and about the existence of a microchip implanted in the subjects' brain as a fail safe. In order to activate the chips, Ageha and his friends infiltrate a military research facility where they are confronted by WISE's Yusaka Aoi. During the confrontation, Sakurako's other personality, dubbed as Abyss, emerges but returns to a dormant state after having her existence rejected by Ageha. Ageha succeeds in killing Yusaka who self destroys and disables the computer which controls the microchip.
13	Invasion; Sen'nyū (潜入)	September 3, 2010; 978-4-08-870149-3	November 5, 2013; 1421551470
108. "Wriggling in the Dark" (闇夜の蠢き, "Yamiyo no Ugomeki"); 109. "Heart Pounding" (ドキドキ, "Dokidoki"); 110. "Trio" (三人, "San'nin"); 111. "Massive" (巨大, "Kyodai"); 112. "Survival" (生存, "Seizon"); 113. "Invasion" (潜入, "Sen'nyū"); 114. "Killing Machine" (殺人鬼, "Satsujinki"); 115. "Diver" (ダイバー, "Daibā"); 116. "Scourge" (スカージ, "Sukāzi")
Miroku has finished recruiting his WISE members. No.7 calls the protagonists back to the future where their actions have resulted in more survivors in residing within Tenju's Root along with Ageha's father and sister. Soon after, WISE has located and began their invasion of Tenju's Root's base.
14	Nova	December 3, 2010; 978-4-08-870149-3	January 7, 2014; 1421551489
117. "Seething" (滾り, "Tagiri"); 118. "Roar" (咆哮, "Hōkō"); 119. "Retribution" (報い, "Mukui"); 120. "Descent" (降臨, "Kōrin"); 121. "Divine Sword" (神刃, "Kamikiri"); 122. "Nova" (ノヴァ); 123. "Sun" (太陽, "Taiyō"); 124. "Tenju" (天樹); 125. "The Night Before the Decisive Battle" (決戦前夜, "Kessen Zen'ya")
A large number of people are captured during the invasion and are used to lure Tenju's Root to WISE's base. Ageha and Sakurako receive trained by Ageha's father in a psi technique developed by him called nova.
15	Psyren	February 4, 2011; 978-4-08-870149-3	March 4, 2014; 1421559153
126. "Hand in Hand" (つなぐ手, "Tsunagu Te"); 127. "Meaning of Life" (生きる意味, "Ikiru Imi"); 128. "Siren" (警報, "Sairen"); 129. "Last Sun" (最後の太陽, "Saigo no Taiyō"); 130. "Fusion" (融合, "Yūgō"); 131. "Time of Change" (替え時, "Kae toki"); 132. "Half of Her" (半身, "Hanshin"); 133. "Sorry I Kept You Waiting" (待たせたな, "Matasetana"); 134. "Requiem" (葬送曲, "Rekuiemu")
While Ageha and Sakurako train, Tenju's Root begin their assault on WISE: Kyle and Frederica battle against WISE's Uranus, Oboro confronts Caprico, and Sakurako fights Shiner. Meanwhile, No.7 summons Matsuri and Kagetora from the present to battle Grana and Junas. Tenju's Root are victorious in their battle and Ageha confronts Miroku.
16	Connected Worlds	March 4, 2011; 978-4-08-870149-3	May 6, 2014; 1421564378
135. "Sheep, Wolves" (羊, 狼, "Hitsuji, Ōkami"); 136. "Siblings" (姉弟, "Kyōdai"); 137. "Sun and Moon" (太陽と月, "Taiyō to Tsuki"); 138. "Reverse" (反転, "Ribāsu"); 139. "Collapse" (崩壊, "Hōkai"); 140. "Release" (解放, "Kaihō"); 141. "Promised Tears" (約束の涙, "Yakusoku no Namida"); 142. "Crown" (王冠, "Ōkan"); 143. "The Path" (道を, "Michi o"); 144. "Live On" (生きろ, "Ikiro"); 145. "Connected Worlds" (繋がる世界, "Tsunagaru Sekai")
Miroku initiates his plan of creating new life and uses all the life force he stole from people. However, he is betrayed by his underling, Mithra, who explains that her master, the asteroid Ouroboros now revealed as Quat Nevas, intends to feed on the life force Miroku gathered in order to drill into the Earth and devour it. No.7 sends the protagonists to the past where Ageha relays a telepathic message from No.7 to Miroku revealing Mithra's true nature; the two then kill her. Miroku leaves to reconsider his goals with WISE while Ageha is put into a coma from overexertion. During his coma, No.7 reveals the future timeline was saved by Miroku and Grana. He then wakes up out of his coma and accompanies Sakurako as they free the present No.7 from her cell.
