= Shonen Jump (magazine) =

Defunct North American manga anthology

- Shonen Jump Volume 1, Issue 1, cover dated January 2003
- Former editors: Jason Thompson; Yumi Hoashi; Marc Weidenbaum; Grant Lowery
- Categories: Manga; Shōnen; Advertising
- Frequency: Monthly
- Circulation: 215,000 (2008)
- Publisher: Hyoe Narita
- First issue: November 26, 2002; 23 years ago
- Final issue: March 7, 2012; 14 years ago
- Company: Viz Media
- Country: United States; Canada
- Based in: San Francisco
- Language: English
- Website: shonenjump.com
- ISSN: 1545-7818

Shonen Jump Comics, Ltd. , officially stylized SHONEN JUMP and abbreviated SJ, was a shōnen manga anthology published in North America by Viz Media. It debuted in November 2002 with the first issue having a January 2003 cover date. Based on Shueisha's popular Japanese magazine Weekly Shōnen Jump, Shonen Jump was retooled for English readers and the American audience, including changing it from a weekly publication to a monthly one. It featured serialized chapters from different manga series and articles on Japanese language and culture, as well as manga, anime, video games, and figurines. The premiere issue of Shonen Jump also introduced the first official English translations of One Piece, Sand Land, Yu-Gi-Oh!, YuYu Hakusho, and Naruto.

Prior to the magazine's launch, Viz launched an extensive marketing campaign to promote it and help it succeed where previous manga anthologies published in North America had failed. Shueisha purchased an equity interest in Viz to help fund the venture, and Cartoon Network, Suncoast, and Diamond Distributors became promotional partners in the magazine. In conjunction with the magazine, Viz launched new imprints for releasing media related to the series presented in the magazine, and other shōnen works. This includes two new manga imprints, an anime DVD imprint, a fiction line for releasing light novels, a label for fan and data books, and a label for the release of art books.

Targeted towards young adult males, the first issue required three printings to meet consumer demand, with over 300,000 copies sold. It was awarded the ICv2 "Comic Product of the Year" award in December 2002, and it continued to enjoy high sales with a monthly circulation of 215,000 in 2008. Approximately half of its circulation came from subscriptions rather than store sales. After the end of its physical circulation, sealed polybagged issues of Shonen Jump are now considered highly sought after among fans and comic book collectors.

Shonen Jump published its final issue in April 2012 when Viz decided to focus on a weekly digital manga anthology. Weekly Shonen Jump (initially named Weekly Shonen Jump Alpha) launched in January 2012. Based on Shueisha's popular Japanese magazine Weekly Shōnen Jump, Weekly Shonen Jump is an attempt to provide English readers with easily accessible, affordable, and officially licensed editions of the latest installments of popular Shōnen Jump manga soon after their release in Japan, as an alternative to popular bootleg scanlation services.

Viz Media published its final digital issue of Weekly Shonen Jump and launched the Shonen Jump digital vault on December 10, 2018, providing access to a limited number of free digital chapters and a subscription service to access their back catalogue of Shonen Jump titles. A global version of Shonen Jump+ was also launched on January 28, 2019, called Manga Plus by Shueisha.

== History ==
In June 2002, Viz Media (at the time called "Viz Communications"), and Shueisha announced that Viz would begin publishing Shonen Jump, an English spin on Shueisha's highly popular manga anthology Weekly Shōnen Jump. Cartoon Network, Suncoast, and Diamond Distributors signed on as promotional partners. Though based on Weekly Shōnen Jump, Viz noted that it would not be a "word for word" copy. Rather, Viz would select series for its magazine that it felt were the most appropriate for its American readers. Viz's version was also set to be monthly, rather than weekly, to better fit the American comic distribution system.

We will be selecting the material most appropriate for the American market. Bear in mind that Shonen Jump has been running since 1968 in Japan. At 500 pages a week, that gives us 884,000 pages of material to draw from!...Our lead titles are Dragon Ball Z and Yu-Gi-Oh, selected for their already-existing popularity in the US. The remainder of the titles will be a combination of those on the verge of breaking out in this country, and those we feel will especially appeal to the target demographic.

— Renee Solberg, Viz Marketing Manager, ICv2

Jason Thompson, one of Viz's manga editors for series including Dragon Ball, was selected as the magazine's first editor-in-chief. Initially, Viz hoped to have the magazine targeted to all age groups; however, to allow for greater freedom in content, the decision was made to mark the magazine as being for readers 13 years of age and older. However, with greater attention being focused on manga as it became available in mainstream outlets, some titles were edited for content. Thompson noted that it was a challenge working with some of the artists whose works would appear in the first issue, who worried about excessive alterations.

With manga anthologies having met with little success in North America, Viz desired Shonen Jump to have a circulation of 1 million within its first three years. To aid in this goal, Viz launched the magazine with a multimillion-dollar advertising budget, they advertised and distributed the title through mass market outlets rather than just pop culture stores, ensuring the magazine included series already popular with the North American audience due to their airing on Cartoon Network. To help fund the lengthy, expensive marketing campaign developed around Shonen Jump, Shueisha purchased an equity interest in Viz in August 2002.

Unlike with most magazine launches, Viz decided to allow retailers to return the first two issues. This gave retailers a chance to see how well the magazine would sell in markets where manga anthologies were an unknown. Retailers were also given a quantity of free samples, distributed 100,000 free samples at Comic Con, and another 100,000 were made available to its partner Suncoast. Cartoon Network began providing sample chapters and streaming video content to its Adult Swim website, along with prominent links to Shonen Jump's official site.

The first issue was released November 26, 2002, with a January 2003 cover date. It premiered with five series: Dragon Ball Z, Sand Land, Yu-Gi-Oh!, YuYu Hakusho, and One Piece. With the launch of the magazine considered successful, Thompson was offered an opportunity to intern in Japan with Shueisha's editors, but declined, due to a lack of interest in the management aspects of the business and a desire to work on his own projects. After six issues had been released, Thompson desired to work on authoring and illustrating his own comic The Stiff. Reflecting back later, he states in an interview with The Comics Journal that "I basically told Viz that I wanted to work part time or I'd quit. It probably wasn't a really nice thing to do." He eventually stepped down as editor-in-chief, being replaced by his former boss Yumi Hoashi.

In February 2005, Viz announced the creation of Shojo Beat, a sister publication of Shonen Jump geared towards female readers. The first issue was released in June 2005 with a July 2005 date cover; it ran for 47 issues until it was discontinued with the release of the July 2009 issue. In 2006, Marc Weidenbaum was named as the Editor-in-Chief for both magazines. Weidenbaum remained the magazine's editor until February 13, 2009, when Viz announced that he had left the company; the magazine's new editor-in-chief has not been named.

As of the June 2011 issue, only 10 issues were published in a year. The magazine is printed at Transcontintental Printing RBW Graphics in Owen Sound, Ontario, Canada.

In October 2011, Viz announced that Weekly Shonen Jump Alpha, a weekly digital version of the magazine would be made available to the public beginning on January 30, 2012. Viz also released its final Shonen Jump print publication in March of that year after Weekly Shonen Jump Alpha was released.

== Features ==
The bulk of each issue of Shonen Jump is composed of chapters from the seven manga titles currently in serialization. Each issue also includes product reviews for anime and manga related games and toys, articles on Japanese language and culture, interviews with manga artists, anime and manga related news, fan related sections such as fan art and letters from readers, and interactive games and trivia sections. Issues also regularly include free premiums, such as rare cards for manga and anime collectible card game adaptations, DVD previews, and video game demo discs.

The magazine's official website includes information on all series released under the "Shonen Jump" label, biographies of the manga artists whose works have been serialized in the magazine, and previews of upcoming issues. Subscribers to the magazine have access to an additional area of the site where they can view preview chapters of manga series in the magazine and being published under the various "Shonen Jump" imprints, download desktop wallpapers, send e-cards, and play games.

As with Weekly Shōnen Jump, special edition stand alone issues of Shonen Jump are released several times a year that focus on a manga series. These issues, which are considered collector's items, include extensive details on the series plot and characters, information on related adaptations of the series, and free premium items, such as full-size posters. Anniversary editions are released yearly, usually featuring higher page counts, color manga pages, and higher end premiums. To celebrate the fifth anniversary of the magazine, Viz also introduced hardback "Collector Editions" of some of the magazine's most popular series as a part of their main "Shonen Jump" manga imprint. The new editions were larger sized, with color dust jackets and higher quality paper than the normal volumes. They also included several full-color pages not seen in the initial releases. Viz also released Shonen Jump Fifth Anniversary Collector's Edition, a hardcover book containing chapters from its best selling series, along with various articles and interviews that appeared in the magazine during its first five-year history, a timeline tracking the history of manga, and essays written by editors from Shonen Jump and Weekly Shōnen Jump.

=== Series ===
The premiere issue of Shonen Jump contained chapters from five different manga series, before it was expanded to include chapters from seven series. Fourteen series were featured in the magazine, with seven having ended their runs to be replaced with other series. Only four of those remained in the magazine until all of their chapters had been published. Each title serialized in the magazine is also published in tankōbon volumes under the company's related "Shonen Jump" and "Shonen Jump Advanced" labels.

This is a complete list of all titles to be serialized in Shonen Jump. It does not include previews of titles. The titles that were running in the magazine when it was discontinued are highlighted.

Title	Creator(s)	First issue	Last issue	Fully serialized?
Bleach	Tite Kubo	November 2007	April 2012	No
Bobobo-bo Bo-bobo	Yoshio Sawai	July 2007	June 2009	No
Dragon Ball Z	Akira Toriyama	January 2003	April 2005	No
Gintama	Hideaki Sorachi	January 2007	May 2007	No
Hikaru no Go	Yumi Hotta (author), Takeshi Obata (artist)	January 2004	April 2008	No
Karakuri Dôji Ultimo	Hiroyuki Takei (story and art), Stan Lee (original concept)	July 2009	February 2011	No
Naruto	Masashi Kishimoto	February 2003	April 2012	No (Note: To compensate for the gap between the original Japanese release and the English adaptation of Naruto, Viz Media announced a "Naruto Nation" campaign, where it would release three volumes a month in the last four months of 2007 in order to close said gap; during this time, no further chapters of Naruto were published in Shonen Jump.)
One Piece	Eiichiro Oda	January 2003	April 2012	No
Psyren	Toshiaki Iwashiro	January 2011	April 2012	No
Sand Land	Akira Toriyama	January 2003	November 2003	Yes
Shaman King	Hiroyuki Takei	March 2003	August 2007	No
Slam Dunk	Takehiko Inoue	May 2008	February 2009	No
Tegami Bachi	Hiroyuki Asada	March 2009	March 2010	No
Yu-Gi-Oh!	Kazuki Takahashi	January 2003	November 2004	Yes
Yu-Gi-Oh! 5D's	Masahiro Hikokubo (author), Masashi Satou (artist)	January 2011	April 2012	No
Yu-Gi-Oh! Millennium World	Kazuki Takahashi	February 2005	December 2007	Yes
Yu-Gi-Oh! GX	Naoyuki Kageyama	January 2007	January 2010	No
Yu Yu Hakusho	Yoshihiro Togashi	January 2003	January 2010	Yes

=== Imprints ===
In conjunction with the Shonen Jump anthology, Viz Media has created multiple new imprints in its various divisions. "Shonen Jump" is the primary manga imprint for releasing the tankōbon volumes of the series that have appeared in the magazine, as well as other similar shōnen titles that were serialized in other Jump magazines in Japan. A second manga imprint, "Shonen Jump Advanced", was launched in April 2005 to target older teenage and young adult readers with more "mature themes."

In October 2005, Viz expanded the "Shonen Jump" imprint into their home video releases. "Shonen Jump Home Video" offers anime series and original video animations adapted from manga series appearing in Shonen Jump.

In 2006, the "SJ Fiction" imprint, part of the Viz Fiction line, was announced. The imprint is used for light novel releases related to manga series appearing in Shonen Jump. "SJ Profiles" prints fan books, data books, and other similar works for the Shonen Jump series, while art books are released under the "Art of SJ" imprint.

== Circulation and audience ==
The initial issue of Shonen Jump sold over 300,000 copies, far exceeding Viz's expected 100,000 copies and making it one of the top comic titles in 2002. The first printing of 250,000 copies was sold out before the issue was released, and two additional printings were necessary to fully meet the demand. After the initial launch, the magazine had an average monthly circulation of 190,000, but it quickly grew to 305,000 by its first anniversary. The August 2003 issue, which included a demo version of an upcoming Yu-Gi-Oh! PC game, was the top issue with 540,000 copies sold. As of 2008, the magazine had a circulation of 215,000, with subscriptions constituting 54% of the copies distributed.

Though targeted towards "tween & teen male consumers", according to Viz Media the magazine enjoys a relatively high number of female and adult readers as well, comprising 36% and 37% of its readership, respectively. The Shonen Jump reader has a median age of 16 years, and over half of the audience is between the ages of 13 and 17. Official measurements by Simmons notes that among minor age readers the female readership is slightly lower and the median age is 12.

== Reception ==
Shonen Jump was considered the "most successful and widely read" manga anthology in North America. In addition to the unparalleled circulation numbers, the "Shonen Jump" manga imprint has had consistently high sales, with many of its titles being top sellers. Naruto has been the line's top seller, accounting for nearly 10% of all manga sales in North America in 2006. In December 2002, the magazine received the ICv2 Award for "Comic Product of the Year" due to its unprecedented sales numbers and its successfully connecting comics to both the television medium and the Yu-Gi-Oh! collectible card game – one of the top CCG games of the year. In the Society for the Promotion of Japanese Animation Awards from 2009, Shonen Jump was the winner in the category "Best Publication".

Reviewers of the magazine applauded the selection of series and the various articles included in each issue. In his coverage of the magazine's debut issue, John Jakala of Anime News Network, compared it to the debut issue of competing work Raijin Comics and was surprised to find himself preferring Shonen Jump, despite it being targeted for a younger age group than Raijin Comics. Calling it an "impressive debut issue", Jakala predicted that its high quality content and high value for the price would result in the anthology becoming a successful anthology in North America. In succeeding reviews, Jakala stated that Shonen Jump put "American comics to shame", particularly in terms of the size of the magazine for the price versus the normal size of a similarly priced issue of a regular comic book. He did, however, note that the episodic nature of some of the series included had started to become repetitive after three issues, and that while the articles might appeal to many readers, he himself skipped over them. In addition to praising the value for the dollar, Comic Book Bin's Leroy Douresseaux felt that each of the chapters included were "a self-sustaining and satisfying tale with a beginning, middle, and end" that, coupled with the character and story summaries included for each series, made it easy for readers to keep up with a series even if they missed an issue.

Color me surprised. Largely as a show of support for the anthology format, I signed up for subscriptions for both RAIJIN COMICS and SHONEN JUMP, but I was sure that I would enjoy the former much more than the latter since RC was promoted as being targeted for an older audience, and since SJ featured series that I associated with young children's cartoons. Instead, having read both first issues, I find that (so far) I much prefer SHONEN JUMP, both in terms of actual story content as well as in terms of the magazine's production values.

— John Jakala, Anime News Network

== See also ==
- List of manga magazines published outside of Japan
