= Oumagadoki Zoo =

Japanese manga series

- First tankōbon volume cover

逢魔ヶ刻動物園 (Ōmagadoki Dōbutsuen)
- Manga
- Written by: Kōhei Horikoshi
- Published by: Shueisha
- Imprint: Jump Comics
- Magazine: Weekly Shōnen Jump
- Original run: July 12, 2010 – April 18, 2011
- Volumes: 5
- icon

Oumagadoki Zoo (Japanese: 逢魔ヶ刻動物園, Hepburn: Ōmagadoki Dōbutsuen) is a Japanese manga series written and illustrated by Kōhei Horikoshi. It was serialized in Shueisha's shōnen manga magazine Weekly Shōnen Jump from July 2010 to April 2011, with its chapters collected in five tankōbon volumes. The story follows Hana Aoi, a clumsy animal loving teenage girl who works at a cursed zoo.

== Plot ==
Hana Aoi, a clumsy teenage girl, is known around her school by the nickname "Clumsy-Good for Nothing". One day, she sees a flyer in town about a zoo that needs workers. After she appears there, she discovers that the zoo is keeping strange things, which she realizes after seeing Shiina, the director of the infamous Oumagadoki Zoo. He has been cursed by a ghost rabbit and given the body of a rabbit. In order to get his original body back, he has to show that he does care for animals by gathering every animal from the world and making his own popular zoo.

== Characters ==
=== Oumagadoki Zoo ===
==== Humans ====
Shiina (椎名)
The lunatic, egotistic director of the Oumagadoki Zoo. He has the body of a rabbit after getting cursed by a ghost rabbit when he was a child. Despite his incredibly childish personality, all the animals of the zoo respect him and he cares for them and see each one as his friend, going ballistic when they are endangered. His techniques are Rabbit Peace, Jet Carrot, Rabbit W Peace, Rabbit Serve, Rabbit Slap, White Rabbit of Inaba, Rabbit Plunge Peace, and Rabbit Million Peace.
Hana Aoi (蒼井 華, Aoi Hana)
The clumsy keeper of the Oumagadoki Zoo, taking the job both in order to change herself, and to spend time with animals. She is to be very knowledgeable about the traits and behaviors of various animals, due to her vast love for them.

==== Animals ====
Uwabami (ウワバミ)
A female snake. When transformed thanks to Shiina's smoke, she bears a resemblance to Medusa. She has a crush on Shiina. Uwabami is also a character in Horikoshi's later work, My Hero Academia.
Oogami (大上, Ōgami)
He is a dhole (red wolf). Although not as powerful as Shiina or Shishido, he is cunning in battle.
Shishido (シシド)
He is a lion. His technique is the Lion Heart, as inspired by Shiina's "Rabbit Peace". An extremely violent young lion, he constantly fights Shiina for the position of director of the zoo, but gets defeated easily.
Gorilla Kong (ゴリラコング, Gorira Kongu)
He is a gorilla, as his name states. Even when transformed, his appearance does not change. His technique is the Gorilla Claw.
Igarashi (イガラシ)
He is a spotted seal. He tends to get kidnapped easily and is a gentleman.
Chita (知多)
He is a cheetah. He is overweight, but with help from Hana, starts to exercise again.
Kasai (加西)
He is an Indian rhinoceros. He has a one-sided crush on Uwabami.
Takahiro (タカヒロ)
He is a white-tailed eagle.
Popo (ポポ)
He is a hippopotamus.
Umemura (梅村)
He is an American bison.
Arai (新井)
She is a raccoon.
Kameda (亀田)
He is a Galapagos tortoise. When transformed, his shell resembles a monster's face. As a tortoise, his weakness is lack of speed.
Kisazou (岐佐蔵, Kisazō)
He is an African elephant.
Hani-Wani (ハニワニ)
He is a Nile crocodile.
Chouda (町田, Chōda)
He is an ostrich.
Fukumoto (福本)
She is a snowy owl.
Iwao (岩尾)
He is a western rockhopper penguin.
Kirishima (桐島)
He is a giraffe.
Momo (モモ)
He is a Japanese giant flying squirrel.
Tetetete (テテテテ)
He is a white-handed gibbon.
Arashi (アラシ)
He is an African porcupine.
Old Man Armadi (アルマジ老師, Arumaji Rōshi)
He is a Brazilian three-banded armadillo.
Blackbuck Man (ブラックバックマン, Burakkubakku Man)
He is a blackbuck.

=== Ushimitsudoki Aquarium ===
==== Humans ====
Isana (伊佐奈)
The director of the Ushimitsudoki Aquarium, an aquarium in the city of Ushimitsu, neighboring Omaga. Shares a curse similar to Shiina and can take the form of a sperm whale. He is feared by the aquarium animals for his ruthless treatment, working them to near death and killing those that refuse to work. He has the ability to generate ultrasound, which can paralyze animals.

==== Animals ====
Sakamata (サカマタ)
He is an orca and No. 2 of the Ushimitsudoki Aquarium.
Kaizou (カイゾウ, Kaizō)
He is a walrus and No. 3 of the Ushimitsudoki Aquarium.
Dholak (ドーラク, Dōraku)
He is a Japanese spider crab and No. 4 of the Ushimitsudoki Aquarium.
Ikkaku (一角)
He is a narwhal and No. 5 of the Ushimitsudoki Aquarium.
Fuka (フカ)
He is a great white shark and No. 6 of the Ushimitsudoki Aquarium.
Tekka Maki (鉄火マキ)
She is a tuna and No. 7 of the Ushimitsudoki Aquarium.
Devilfish (デビルフィッシュ, Debirufisshu)
He is a common octopus and No. 8 of the Ushimitsudoki Aquarium.
Tsubo (ツボ)
He is a moray eel.

=== Yatsudoki Circus ===
==== Humans ====
Hiero Michinoke (道乃家 日枝狼, Michinoke Hierō)
The director of the Yatsudoki Circus.
Yu Kikuchi (菊池 悠, Kikuchi Yū)
The new member of the Yatsudoki Circus.
Taro Suzuki (鈴木 太郎, Suzuki Tarō)
The animal trainer of the Yatsudoki Circus.
Shikuma (志久万)
The total ruler of the Yatsudoki Circus. Like Shiina and Isana, he shares a curse and can take the form of a brown bear.

==== Animals ====
Toytoy (トイトイ, Toitoi)
She is a toy poodle.
Byakkov (ビャッコフ, Byakkofu)
He is a white tiger.
Rodeo (ロデオ)
He is a thoroughbred.

=== Other humans ===
Mukio Hanauwa (鼻上向夫, Hanauwa Mukio)
The son of Mukanai.
Mukanai Hanauwa (鼻上向内, Hanauwa Mukanai)
The sponsor president of the Ushimi Construction Works and the father of Mukio.
Ikumi Hasuda (蓮田 育美, Hasuda Ikumi)
Hana's classmate. She always calls her a useless woman and finds it annoying whenever Hana keeps trying.
Miura (三浦)
Ikumi's boyfriend.
Noriko Kuchinashi (梔子 典子, Kuchinashi Noriko)
One of Hana's classmates and friends.
Sofue (祖父江)
Fujio Mizoguchi (溝口 藤夫, Mizoguchi Fujio)
The gym teacher of the school Hana goes to.

== Publication ==
Oumagadoki Zoo is written and illustrated by Kōhei Horikoshi. The series was serialized in Shueisha's Weekly Shōnen Jump from July 12, 2010, to April 18, 2011. Shueisha collected its chapters in five tankōbon volumes, published from November 4, 2010, to August 4, 2011.

=== Volumes ===
No.	Title	Japanese release date	Japanese ISBN
1	Welcome to Oumagadoki; Oumagadoki Ni Irasshai (逢魔ヶ刻にいらっしゃい)	November 4, 2010	978-4-08-870131-8
Chapter 1. "Welcome to Oumagadoki" (逢魔ヶ刻にいらっしゃい, "Oumagadoki Ni Irasshai"); Chapter 2. "The Bunny, The Gorilla and the Animal Keeper" (ウサギとゴリラと飼育員, "Usagi to Gorira to Shiikuin"); Chapter 3. "The Rabbit, The Cheetah and The Behavior Exhibition" (ウサギとチーターと行動展示, "Usagi to Chiitaa to Koudou Tenji"); Chapter 4. "Rabbit Goes to Town" (ウサギ、街へ出る, "Usagi, Machi-e Deru"); Chapter 5. "The Rabbit, The Sea and the Way of Love" (ウサギと海と恋模様, "Usagi to Umi to Koimoyou"); Chapter 6. "The Rabbit and the King of Beasts" (ウサギと百獣の王, "Usagi to Hyakujuu no Ou"); Chapter 7. "The Director and the Lion" (園長とライオン, "Enchou to Raion")
2	Welcome to Ushimitsudoki Aquarium; Ushimitsudoki Suizokukan E Irasshai (丑三ッ時水族館へいらっしゃい)	December 29, 2010	978-4-08-870167-7
Chapter 8. "The Rabbit and the Unidentified Walking Object" (ウサギと未確認歩行物体, "Usagi to Mikakuninhokoubuttai"); Chapter 9. "The Aquarium's Invasion" (水族館の侵略, "Suizokukan no Shinryaku"); Chapter 10. "Zoo vs. Aquarium - The Outburst" (動物園 VS 水族館勃発, "Doubutsuen baasasu Suizokukan Boppatsu"); Chapter 11. "Welcome to Ushimitsudoki Aquarium!" (丑三ッ時水族館へいらっしゃい, "Ushimitsudoki Suizokukan E Irasshai"); Chapter 12. "Assault! The Local Aquarium" (突撃！ 隣の水族館, "Totsugeki! Tonari no Suizokukan"); Chapter 13. "Shiina and Isana" (椎名と伊佐奈, "Shiina to Isana"); Chapter 14. "Zoo vs. Aquarium! It Begins!" (動物園 VS 水族館、 開始, "Doubutsuen baasasu Suizokukan, Kaishi"); Chapter 15. "Willpower of the Underdog" (負け犬根性, "Makeinu Konjou"); Chapter 16. "Duel of Honorable Men" (漢の決闘, "Otoko no Kettou")
3	Zoo vs. Aquarium, The Conclusion; Doubutsuen baasasu Suizokukan, Ketchaku (動物園 VS 水族館, 決着)	March 4, 2011	978-4-08-870195-0
Chapter 17. "Lion vs. Orca" (ライオン VS シャチ, "Raion baasasu Shachi"); Chapter 18. "Get Igarashi...!" (イガラシを...!, "Igarashi o...!"); Chapter 19. "Awkwardness vs. Power" (不器用 VS 力, "Bukiyou baasasu Chikara"); Chapter 20. "Zoo Director vs. Aquarium Director" (園長 VS 館長, "Enchou baasasu Kanchou"); Chapter 21. "The Curse of the Whale" (鯨の呪い, "Kujira no noroi"); Chapter 22. "Buddies" (仲間, "Nakama"); Chapter 23. "Zoo vs. Aquarium, The Conclusion" (動物園 VS 水族館, 決着, "Doubutsuen baasasu Suizokukan, Ketchaku"); Chapter 24. "Who is the Strongest in the Park!?" (園の最強は誰!?, "En no saikyou wa Dare!?"); Chapter 25. "Visitors Have Come!" (お客さん来た!, "O-kyaku san Kita!")
4	Welcome to Yatsudoki Circus; Yatsudoki Saakasu E Irasshai (ヤツドキサーカスへいらっしゃい)	June 3, 2011	978-4-08-870226-1
Chapter 26. "Animal Keeper Goes to School" (飼育員, 学校へ行く, "Shiikuin, Gakkou E Iku"); Chapter 27. "Kikuchi-kun's Discussion" (菊池くんの相談, "Kikuchi-kun no Soudan"); Chapter 28. "Welcome to Yatsudoki Circus" (ヤツドキサーカスへいらっしゃい, "Yatsudoki Saakasu E Irasshai"); Chapter 29. "The Mystery of Yatsudoki" (ヤツドキの謎, "Yatsudoki no Nazo"); Chapter 30. "The King of Beasts vs. The King of the Jungle" (百獣の王VS密林の王, "Hyakujuu no Ou baasasu Mitsurin no Ou"); Chapter 31. "Growing" (育ち盛り, "Sodachizakari"); Chapter 32. "Uwabami vs. Toytoy" (ウワバミVSトイトイ, "Uwabami baasasu Toitoi")
5	Oumagadoki Zoo; Oumagadoki Doubutsuen (逢魔ヶ刻動物園)	August 4, 2011	978-4-08-870275-9
Chapter 33. "Black Circus" (黒いサーカス, "Kuroi Saakasu"); Chapter 34. "Bear's Circus Troupe" (クマのサーカス団, "Kuma no Saakasu-Dan"); Chapter 35. "An Elephant's Seriousness" (象の本気, "Zou no Honki"); Chapter 36. "Animals don't Talk" (動物は喋らない, "Doubutsu wa Shaberanai"); Chapter 37. "Oumagadoki Zoo" (逢魔ヶ刻動物園, "Oumagadoki Doubutsuen")
