= Blue Flag (manga) =

Japanese manga series by Kaito

- First tankōbon volume cover, featuring Tōma Mita (left), Taichi Ichinose (middle), and Futaba Kuse (right)

青のフラッグ (Ao no Furaggu)
- Genre: Drama; Romance; Slice of life
- Created by: Kaito
- Manga
- Written by: Kaito
- Published by: Shueisha
- English publisher: NA: Viz Media
- Imprint: Jump Comics+
- Magazine: Shōnen Jump+
- Original run: February 1, 2017 – April 8, 2020
- Volumes: 8

Blue Flag (Japanese: 青のフラッグ, Hepburn: Ao no Furaggu) is a Japanese manga series written and illustrated by Kaito, the creator of Cross Manage. It was serialized digitally on Shōnen Jump+ from February 2017 to April 2020, and publisher Shueisha later collected the chapters in eight tankōbon volumes. A slice-of-life manga set in a high school, Blue Flag tells the story of a group of friends who must navigate personal difficulties, societal expectations, and their feelings for and about each other.

Blue Flag has been well received by readers and critics, who have praised its art style, characters, and handling of LGBTQ themes. In North America, an English translation was licensed and published by Viz Media. It has also been translated into Chinese, French, German, Italian, Polish, Portuguese, and Spanish.

== Synopsis ==
On the first day of the school year at a Japanese high school, Taichi Ichinose, a student, finds that he has been assigned to the same class as his childhood friend Tōma Mita. He and Tōma have drifted apart in recent years, and Taichi is confused to learn that Tōma now hopes to rekindle their friendship. Taichi is soon approached by another student in their class, Futaba Kuse, who tells him that she has a crush on Tōma and asks for his help in getting closer to Tōma. Taichi reluctantly agrees. As Futaba is getting to know Tōma, Taichi and Tōma meet Futaba's protective female friend, Masumi Itachi. Masumi corners Tōma and tells him that she knows he has secret romantic feelings for Taichi, and that she is perceptive about such things because she herself has feelings for Futaba.

Over time, the four characters all become friends. They navigate high school together; Tōma agrees to be cheer captain for the Sports Festival and insists that Taichi and Futaba be his vice-captains, and later they all focus on their college entrance exams. Eventually, a fifth friend is added to their group: Mami Yagihara, a girl who chafes against the sexist double standards imposed on her as an attractive, popular teenage girl. She resents, for example, that while other students can be friends with each other, she is unable be friends with boys without being accused of flirting with them or leading them on. Taichi and Futaba become a couple and choose to remain together even after Tōma confesses his feelings to Taichi. The final chapter contains a time skip to several years in the future, where the reader learns, among other things, that Taichi and Futaba have broken up, and Taichi and Tōma are living together as a married couple.

== Production ==
Blue Flag is written and illustrated by Kaito, a manga artist whose previous works all appeared in Weekly Shōnen Jump and who is best known as the creator of Cross Manage. In a mini-comic accompanying the final tankōbon volume, Kaito described four main goals they (Note: As Kaito's gender is not publicly known, this article uses singular they to refer to Kaito.) hoped to accomplish when they began the story: to create characters who felt like real humans, to focus on the characters' feelings rather than on surprising plot developments, to write characters having proper conversations with one another, and to emphasize subjective point of view within the art style. Another of Kaito's aims was to create a story where characters' diverse romantic feelings—whether heterosexual, homosexual, or bisexual—were all treated the same.

== Publication ==
Blue Flag was published serially on the Shōnen Jump+ website and app from February 1, 2017 until April 8, 2020. Its 53 chapters have been published in eight tankōbon volumes by Shueisha.

At Anime Expo 2019, Viz Media announced they licensed the series in English. Manga Plus also published the series in English. It is also licensed in Chinese by Tong Li Publishing, in French by Kurokawa, in German by Carlsen Verlag, in Italian and Portuguese by Panini Comics, in Spanish by Editorial Ivrea, and in Polish by Studio JG.

=== Volumes ===
No.	Original release date	Original ISBN	English release date	English ISBN
1	April 4, 2017	978-4-08-881045-4	April 21, 2020	978-1-9747-1301-1
2	August 4, 2017	978-4-08-881145-1	June 16, 2020	978-1-9747-1302-8
3	December 4, 2017	978-4-08-881308-0	August 18, 2020	978-1-9747-1303-5
4	May 5, 2018	978-4-08-881485-8	October 20, 2020	978-1-9747-1304-2
5	September 4, 2018	978-4-08-881580-0	December 15, 2020	978-1-9747-1305-9
6	April 4, 2019	978-4-08-881769-9	February 16, 2021	978-1-9747-1306-6
7	December 4, 2019	978-4-08-882163-4	April 20, 2021	978-1-9747-1875-7
8	June 4, 2020	978-4-08-882365-2	June 15, 2021	978-1-9747-2094-1

== Reception ==
In 2017, the series was ranked third at the 3rd Next Manga Awards in the web category. The series was a finalist for the 2020 Los Angeles Times book prize in the graphic novels category. The Young Adult Library Services Association listed the series in the top ten in their 2021 list of the 126 best graphic novels for teenagers.

Rebecca Silverman from Anime News Network rated the first seven volumes A− and the final volume B+. Silverman praised the series for its art, story, and exploration of its themes, while criticizing its occasionally heavy-handed dialogue and its underdevelopment of Futaba as a character. Melina Dargis from The Fandom Post gave the series heavy praise for its storytelling, characters, and art, saying it was the best high-school slice-of-life manga of 2020 by far.

Blue Flag has been praised by readers for its handling of LGBTQ characters and themes. Following the release of its final chapter, in which protagonist Taichi was revealed to be bisexual, the series saw a sharp increase in reader interest, with many LGBTQ readers commenting that the story resonated with their personal lives. In Japan, Huffington Post and several other online platforms have recommended Blue Flag for readers interested in confronting their own prejudices against LGBTQ people. Readers and reviewers have suggested that Blue Flag is an effective teaching tool in this way because sexuality is not an overt focus of the story, especially early in the series, and because the story's focus on its characters' decision-making encourages readers to think more deeply about the characters' relationships.
