= The Comiq =

Japanese manga series

- Tankōbon volume cover
- Genre: Mystery, thriller
- Manga
- Written by: Kazuki Takahashi
- Published by: Shueisha
- English publisher: NA: Viz Media
- Imprint: Jump Comics
- Magazine: Weekly Shōnen Jump
- English magazine: NA: Weekly Shonen Jump
- Original run: October 15, 2018 – November 26, 2018
- Volumes: 1
- icon

The Comiq (stylized in all caps) is a Japanese manga series written and illustrated by Kazuki Takahashi. It was serialized in Shueisha's shōnen manga magazine Weekly Shōnen Jump from October to November 2018, with its chapters collected in a single tankōbon volume.

== Plot ==
The story is set in near-future Japan, where prison inmates are assigned manga background art as part of their labor. Ryota Sakamaki, a novice shōjo manga artist, relies on his editor to subcontract his background artwork to an exceptionally detail-oriented assistant. When police question him about a symbol in his manga linked to an unsolved murder from three years prior—the "Halloween Murder Case"—Ryota returns home to find his manuscript data erased and a spiked black pumpkin doll hanging outside his window. Forced into a mystery he does not understand, Sakamaki investigates the cold case.

The victim, a 22-year-old woman, was pushed to her death from a hilltop park on Halloween night. The confessed killer, Baba Katsuo, a then-23-year-old unemployed man, was swiftly arrested—but Sakamaki discovers he is his anonymous prison assistant. Visiting him in jail, Ryota learns Baba has been mute since the incident and has been using their manga collaboration to silently proclaim his innocence. The story unfolds as Sakamaki and Baba use manga clues to uncover the truth behind the murder.

== Publication ==
Written and illustrated by Kazuki Takahashi, The Comiq was serialized in Shueisha's shōnen manga magazine Weekly Shōnen Jump from October 15 to November 26, 2018. Shueisha collected its seven chapters in a single tankōbon volume, released on January 4, 2019.

In North America, the manga was licensed by Viz Media and published on their Weekly Shonen Jump digital magazine. Viz Media published the volume digitally on June 28, 2022.

No.	Original release date	Original ISBN	English release date	English ISBN
1	January 4, 2019	978-4-08-881745-3	June 28, 2022	978-1-9747-1005-8
