= Cross Manage =

Japanese manga series

- First tankōbon volume cover

クロス・マネジ (Kurosu Maneji)
- Genre: Romantic comedy; Sports
- Manga
- Written by: Kaito
- Published by: Shueisha
- English publisher: NA: Viz Media
- Imprint: Jump Comics
- Magazine: Weekly Shōnen Jump
- English magazine: NA: Weekly Shonen Jump
- Original run: September 15, 2012 – July 16, 2013
- Volumes: 5
- icon

Cross Manage (Japanese: クロス・マネジ, Hepburn: Kurosu Maneji) is a Japanese manga series written and illustrated by Kaito. It was serialized in Shueisha's shōnen manga magazine Weekly Shōnen Jump from September 2012 to July 2013; its chapters were collected in five tankōbon volumes. The series was also published in North America in English through Viz Media's digital manga anthology, Weekly Shonen Jump.

== Plot ==
Teenager Sakurai is forced into becoming the manager of the girls' lacrosse team at his school after accidentally touching the chest of his female classmate Toyoguchi. Sakurai is reluctant at first but after witnessing Toyoguchi's extreme determination and hard work, Sakurai tries again to put all of his efforts into something and becomes the manager of the team. While Toyoguchi is thrilled, there are many other members of the team who are not, Sakurai has his work cutout for him as he has to prove his worth to the other girls while also solving current problems that arise for the team.

== Characters ==
- Sakurai: Manager of the Fujioka Lacrosse Club
- Misora Toyoguchi: Captain and an attacker of the Fujioka Lacrosse Club
- Nachi (Nacchin) Saiga: Best friend of Misora and Midfielder on the team
- Rurie Tanaka: Defensive Player
- Junko (Jun) Mizuhashi: Defensive Player
- Shinobu Komatsu: Goalie
- Ichino Noto: Attacking Player
- Aya Sawashiro: Defensive Player
- Yurika Kato: Attacking Player
- Sanari and Unari Yuki: Midfielder Players
- Momiji Kujidera: Defensive Player
- Hana Nozawa: Defensive Player
- Seki: One of Sakurai's best friends
- Wakamoto: One of Sakurai's best friends
- Sugita: Club Advisor for Fujioka Lacrosse Club
- Chiumi Hayami: Soccer Club manager who has a crush on Sakurai
- Ryuzo Nakahara: "Big Brother" to Misora and son of the owner of Nakahara sports store
- Teruki: Worker at the Nakahara sports store
- Namine Chihara: Best lacrosse player in Japan and on Choran's first string lacrosse team
- Momo Mimori: Midfielder for Choran who aspires to be as good as Namine
- Toka Yamauchi: Captain of Choran's first string lacrosse team and Defender
- Jueri Watanabe: Goalie for Choran who is another prodigy like Namine
- Makoto Yokoyama: Midfielder for Choran
- Karuto Okamura: Defender for Choran
- Ageha Matsui: Attacker for Choran
- Anzu Hikasa: Defender for Choran
- Michiru Omoto: Defender for Choran
- Kazuha Koshimizu: Defender for Choran
- Mahori Sonozaki: Attacker for Choran
- Tsubaki Imai: Attacker for Choran
- Hyoketsu Nakao: Principal of Choran and coach of their lacrosse team

== Publication ==
Written and illustrated by Kaito, Cross Manage was serialized in Shueisha's shōnen manga magazine Weekly Shōnen Jump from September 15, 2012, to July 16, 2013. A special chapters was published in Jump Next! on October 15, 2013. Shueisha compiled its individual chapters into five tankōbon volumes published between March 4 and November 1, 2013.

In North America, the manga was published by Viz Media and serialized in Weekly Shonen Jump Alpha. The first chapter of the manga was published on October 1, 2012. Viz Media has released all five tankōbon volumes through their digital manga service from May 14, 2013, to March 11, 2014.

=== Volumes ===
No.	Original release date	Original ISBN	English release date	English ISBN
1	March 4, 2013	978-4-08-870635-1	May 14, 2013	978-1-4215-6447-0
2	May 2, 2013	978-4-08-870669-6	August 27, 2013	978-1-4215-6805-8
3	July 4, 2013	978-4-08-870770-9	October 8, 2013	978-1-4215-7139-3
4	September 4, 2013	978-4-08-870807-2	December 24, 2013	978-1-4215-7390-8
5	November 1, 2013	978-4-08-870839-3	March 11, 2014	978-1-4215-7535-3

== See also ==
- Blue Flag, another manga series by the same author
