= Barrage (manga) =

Japanese manga series

- First tankōbon volume cover, featuring Astro (right) and Tiamat (left)

戦星のバルジ (Sensei no Baruji)
- Genre: Adventure; Fantasy
- Manga
- Written by: Kōhei Horikoshi
- Published by: Shueisha
- English publisher: NA: Viz Media
- Imprint: Jump Comics
- Magazine: Weekly Shōnen Jump
- English magazine: NA: Weekly Shonen Jump
- Original run: May 21, 2012 – September 10, 2012
- Volumes: 2
- icon

Barrage (Japanese: 戦星のバルジ, Hepburn: Sensei no Baruji; lit. Barrage on the Battle Star) is a Japanese manga series written and illustrated by Kōhei Horikoshi. It was first published in 2011 as a one-shot manga in Shueisha's Jump Next!, before being serialized Weekly Shōnen Jump from May to September 2012, with its chapters collected in two tankōbon volumes. The story follows Astro, a dim-witted but kind young man from the slums, on a journey across the planet of Industria. He meets the prince, who looks and sounds like him, and, following a certain incident, ends up becoming the prince who defends Industria with his weapon called the Org.

In North America, the series was licensed for English release by Viz Media, who published it on the digital manga anthology, Weekly Shonen Jump, and released its two volumes in print in March and April 2013.

== Plot ==
On the planet of Industria where aliens fight with humans, a young slum dweller Astro works tirelessly to feed his adopted brothers and sisters. One day, after an argument with his boss, Astro saves him from the alien Archduke of Endra. Despite this, Astro is fired. Distraught, he accidentally meets his doppelganger, the runaway Prince Barrage of Industria, who wants Astro to act as his substitute. Astro decides to assume the role of the prince of Industria to prevent arousing suspicion from enemy aliens and protect his beloved "family".

== Characters ==
Astro (アストロ, Asutoro)
Growing up in the slums of the capital as an orphan, Astro is extremely dedicated to his adopted family, working long hours for food and shelter. He believes so strongly in the value of family that he is willing to help any family member in need, at times forgetting his assumed identity as the Prince much to Tiamat's displeasure. Astro is a capable wielder of the Org (王具（オーグ）, Ōgu; lit. "King's Device"; translated by Viz Media as both The Royal Relic and the Orgue), a mysterious weapon said to control the planet of Industria. He later finds out that he is the true Prince Barrage.
Tiamat (ティアマト, Tiamato)
The loyal vice-captain of the military forces under the Planetary King of Industria. He becomes Astro's companion and personally trains him in swordsmanship throughout their journey. Tiamat harbors a severe phobia of women, going to great lengths to avoid them.
Prince Barrage (バルジ, Baruji)
The son of the Planetary King of Industria and the prince of Industria. He very closely resembles Astro down to the same hair color, height, and voice, yet both have different personalities. Unlike Astro, Prince Barrage is arrogant, spoiled, and abusive to his own servants, such as Jino. He was killed instantly by a laser when a mysterious sniper thought he was Astro, not seeing the resemblance at all, who was going to do whatever he wanted free of all responsibilities. It is later revealed that he is an evil twin or dark energy counterpart of Astro, who is the true Prince Barrage.
The Planetary King of Industria (インダストリアの星王, Indasutoria no Seiō)
The current ruler of Industria and the former wielder of the Org.
Tico (ティコ, Tiko)
A young girl who seeks revenge for her adoptive mother's death at the hands of aliens. She lives in Masayle, a place of strategic importance to the capital of Industria.

== Publication ==
Barrage is written and illustrated by Kōhei Horikoshi. The series was originally published on August 12, 2011, as a one-shot manga in the seasonally published Jump Next!. It was then serialized in Shueisha's Weekly Shōnen Jump from May 21 to September 10, 2012, Shueisha compiled the individual chapters in two tankōbon volumes published on October 4 and November 2, 2012.

In North America, the series was published in English by Viz Media on its digital manga magazine Weekly Shonen Jump (formerly known as Weekly Shonen Jump Alpha) beginning on June 4, 2012, with chapters being released two weeks behind the Japanese publication. The volumes of the series were released on March 5 and April 2, 2013.

=== Volumes ===
No.	Original release date	Original ISBN	English release date	English ISBN
1	October 4, 2012	978-4-08-870583-5	October 4, 2012 (Digital); March 5, 2013 (Print)	978-1421552750
01. "The Piercer" (つらぬくもの, Tsuranuku Mono); 02. "The Little Prince" (星の王子様, Hoshi no Ōji Sama); 03. "The Prince's Job" (王子の仕事, Ōji no Shigoto); 04. "Start" (スタート, Sutāto); 05. "Hands-On Training" (実戦教育, Jissen Kyōiku); 06. "Family or Self" (家族か己か, Tami ka Onore ka); 07. "Astro's Determination" (決意のアストロ, Ketsui no Asutoro)
2	November 2, 2012	978-4-08-870584-2	November 13, 2012 (Digital); April 2, 2013 (Print)	978-1421555713
08. "Tiko" (ティコ, Tiko); 09. "Astro's Past" (アストロの過去, Asutoro no Kako); 10. "Dark Energy" (暗黒エネルギー, Dāku Enerugī); 11. "The Org Revives" (甦る〝王具〟, Yomigaeru "Ōgu"); 12. "Fresh Resolve" (決意あらたに, Ketsui Arata ni); 13. "Meeting The Enemy" (敵と会う, Teki to Au); 14. "Crooked Sorrows" (歪んじまった悲しみに, Yuganjimatta Kanashimi ni); 15. "All-Around Showdown" (各々決着, Onoono Ketchaku); 16. "Astro of the Warring Planets" (戦星のアストロ, Sensei no Asutoro)
