= Teenage Renaissance! David =

Japanese manga series by Yushin Kuroki

- First tankōbon volume cover, featuring David (left) and Venus (right)

思春期ルネサンス! ダビデ君 (Shishunki Runesansu! Dabide-kun)
- Genre: Comedy
- Manga
- Written by: Yushin Kuroki
- Published by: Shueisha
- English publisher: NA: Viz Media
- Imprint: Jump Comics
- Magazine: Weekly Shōnen Jump
- English magazine: NA: Weekly Shonen Jump
- Original run: September 15, 2018 – May 27, 2019
- Volumes: 4
- icon

Teenage Renaissance! David (Japanese: 思春期ルネサンス! ダビデ君, Hepburn: Shishunki Runesansu! Dabide-kun) is a Japanese manga series written and illustrated by Yushin Kuroki, serialized in Shueisha's shōnen manga magazine Weekly Shōnen Jump from September 2018 to May 2019, with its chapters collected in four tankōbon volumes.

== Plot ==
A high school freshman named David who physically resembles Michelangelo's David yearns for the affection of Venus (based on The Birth of Venus painting), the most popular girl in the school. David, while good-hearted, is awkward with his demeanor and unintentionally perverted, often shouting in Italian if things go wrong for him. With the help of his friends who also happen to be based on famous art, David works to not only win Venus over, but even show he is better than he thinks. The manga occasionally parodies famous paintings and statues with its characters.

== Publication ==
Teenage Renaissance! David, written and illustrated by Yushin Kuroki, was serialized in Shueisha's shōnen manga magazine Weekly Shōnen Jump from September 15, 2018, to May 27, 2019. Shueisha collected its chapters in four tankōbon volumes, released from January 4 to July 4, 2019.

Viz Media published the series' first three chapters for its "Jump Start" initiative. Shueisha simultaneously published the manga in English on its Manga Plus online platform.

=== Volumes ===
No.	Release date	ISBN
1	January 4, 2019	978-4-08-881670-8
2	March 4, 2019	978-4-08-881755-2
3	June 4, 2019	978-4-08-881862-7
4	July 4, 2019	978-4-08-882018-7
