= Kōhei Horikoshi =

Japanese manga artist primarily known for his work My Hero Academia

Kōhei Horikoshi 堀越 耕平
- Born: Kōhei Horikoshi; November 20, 1986 (age 40) Aichi Prefecture, Japan
- Area: Manga artist
- Notable works: Oumagadoki Zoo; Barrage; My Hero Academia
- Awards: Sugoi Japan Award (2017); Harvey Award (2019)

Kōhei Horikoshi (堀越 耕平, Horikoshi Kōhei; born November 20, 1986) is a Japanese manga artist known for creating the manga series Oumagadoki Zoo, Barrage, and My Hero Academia, all of which have been serialized in Shueisha's shōnen manga magazine Weekly Shōnen Jump. His latter work had over 100 million copies in circulation by April 2024, making it one of the best-selling manga series of all time. Horikoshi is a graduate of Toho High School and Nagoya University of Arts and is a native of Aichi Prefecture. He was a former assistant for Yasuki Tanaka, creator of the manga series Summer Time Rendering, Hitomi no Catoblepas, and Kagijin.

Horikoshi stated that his favorite manga series as a child were Dragon Ball, One Piece, and Naruto. He was also influenced by manga artist Yuko Osada (Toto!: The Wonderful Adventure). Horikoshi is also a fan of American superhero comic books, particularly Marvel Comics.

== Works ==
Title	Year	Magazine	Publisher(s)	Notes	Ref.
Tenko (テンコ)	2007	Akamaru Jump	Shueisha	One-shot	
My Hero (僕のヒーロー, Boku no Hīrō)	2008	Akamaru Jump	Shueisha	One-shot	
Shinka Rhapsody (進化ラプソディ, Shinka Rapusodi)	2008	Akamaru Jump	Shueisha	One-shot	
Oumagadoki Zoo (逢魔ヶ刻動物園, Ōmagadoki Dōbutsuen)	2010–11	Weekly Shōnen Jump	Shueisha	Manga	
Barrage (戦星のバルジ, Sensei no Baruji)	2012	Weekly Shōnen Jump	Shueisha (Japanese); Viz Media (English)	Manga	
My Hero Academia (僕のヒーローアカデミア, Boku no Hīrō Akademia)	2014–2024	Weekly Shōnen Jump	Shueisha (Japanese); Viz Media (English)	Manga	
Quit Laughing, Shijima (笑わないでよ しじまさん, Warawanaide yo Shijima-san)	2026	Weekly Shōnen Jump	Shueisha (Japanese); Viz Media (English)	One-shot	

== Awards and nominations ==
Year	Award	Category	Work/Nominee	Result	Ref.
2015	1st Next Manga Award	Print Manga	My Hero Academia	Won	
2015	8th Manga Taishō	Manga Taishō	My Hero Academia	8th place	
2015	Mandō Kobayashi Manga Award	Manga Grand Prix	My Hero Academia	Won	
2016	40th Kodansha Manga Award	Best Shōnen Manga	My Hero Academia	Nominated	
2017	Japan Expo Awards	Daruma d'Or Manga	My Hero Academia	Won	
2017	Japan Expo Awards	Daruma for Best Shōnen	My Hero Academia	Nominated	
2017	3rd Sugoi Japan Award	Best Manga	My Hero Academia	Won	
2017	44th Angoulême International Comics Festival	Best Youth Comic	My Hero Academia	Nominated	
2017	23rd Salón del Manga de Barcelona	Best Shōnen Manga	My Hero Academia	Won	
2018	Seoul Media Comics	Manga Creator Award	Kōhei Horikoshi	Won	
2018	Japan Expo Awards	Daruma for Best Shōnen	My Hero Academia	Won	
2018	30th Harvey Awards	Best Manga	My Hero Academia	Nominated	
2018	24th Salón del Manga de Barcelona	Best Shōnen Manga	My Hero Academia	Won	
2019	31st Harvey Awards	Best Manga	My Hero Academia	Won	
2020	47th Angoulême International Comics Festival	Best Youth Comic	My Hero Academia	Nominated	
