= Kazuki Takahashi =

Japanese manga artist (1961–2022)

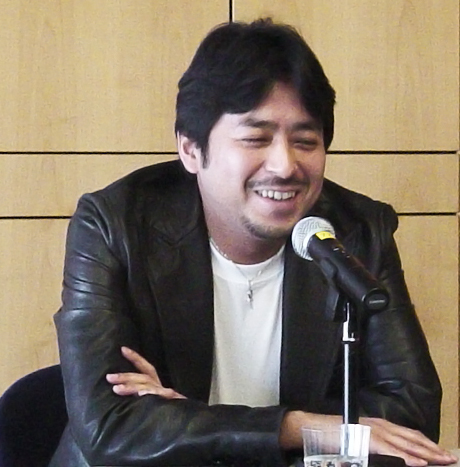
- Takahashi at the 2005 Leipzig Book Fair
- Born: Takahashi Kazuo (高橋 一雅); October 4, 1961; Tokyo, Japan
- Died: July 4, 2022 (aged 60); Nago, Okinawa, Japan
- Occupation: Manga artist
- Years active: 1981–2020
- Organization: Studio Dice
- Notable work: Yu-Gi-Oh!

Japanese name
- Kanji: 高橋 和希
Transcriptions
- Romanization: Takahashi Kazuki
- Website: studio-dice.com

Kazuo Takahashi (Japanese: 高橋 一雅, Hepburn: Takahashi Kazuo; October 4, 1961 – July 4, 2022), known professionally as Kazuki Takahashi (高橋 和希, Takahashi Kazuki), was a Japanese manga artist. He is best known as the author of Yu-Gi-Oh!, published in Weekly Shōnen Jump from 1996 to 2004. The manga spawned a trading card game of the same name, which holds the Guinness World Record for the best-selling trading card game of all time.

== Early life ==
Kazuo Takahashi was born in Tokyo on October 4, 1961. In his childhood, he drew artwork of manga he enjoyed such as Tiger Mask, Ultraman, Space Battleship Yamato, Mazinger Z, Devilman, and Kamen Rider. He also played tennis in his youth.

Disinterested in his studies, Takahashi was shamed by his homeroom teacher as "a poop-making machine", in front of other students, saying that all Takahashi did was "eat, sleep, and poop". Angered by the humiliation, Takahashi decided to become a manga artist. In his second year of high school, he also sought to be a background animator of Tezuka Productions. He planned to drop out of school if he passed the recruitment exam, but he failed as his drawing skills were not yet up to industry standard. Takahashi gave up on his goal of becoming an animator, instead becoming a designer of corporate logos and banners, which included making designs for pachislot panels. It was also at this time he started submitting his manga to publishers.

== Career ==
In 1981, at the age of 20, Takahashi's one-shot manga Ing! Love Ball, submitted under the pen name "Hajime Miyabi (雅はじめ, Miyabi Hajime)", won the Shogakukan New Comic Award and was published in Weekly Shōnen Sunday in the same year. His serial debut was in 1986 with Gō-Q-Chōji Ikkiman, an adaptation of the TV sports anime of the same name, published in Kodansha's Weekly Shōnen Magazine. In the meantime, Takahashi explained that he experienced extreme poverty as his home lacked electricity and he made thirty-six times of credit card installments in the magazine.

George Morikawa, author of Hajime no Ippo, described his living place from that time as "dilapidated Showa era wooden apartment that people immediately thought of". Because his early works were unprofitable, Takahashi switched his direction to Shueisha. In 1990, his one-shot Tokiō no Taka was published in Weekly Shōnen Jump. Another manga, Tennenshoku Danji Buray, was published in the magazine from 1991 to 1992.

In 1996, Takahashi launched Yu-Gi-Oh! under the pen name "Kazuki Takahashi" in Weekly Shōnen Jump, where it was serialized until 2004. The series became a huge success and has sold more than 40 million copies. It has also received several media adaptations, notably an anime television series and a trading card game developed by Konami, which holds the Guinness World Record for the best-selling trading card game in history, with more than 25.1 billion cards sold as of 2011. Following the end of the original manga's serialization, Takahashi would supervise adaptions made by his assistants, such as Yu-Gi-Oh! R by Akira Itō, Yu-Gi-Oh! GX by Naoyuki Kageyama and Yu-Gi-Oh! 5D's by Masashi Sato. He was also involved in the animation production of Yu-Gi-Oh! Bonds Beyond Time and Yu-Gi-Oh! The Dark Side of Dimensions.

In 2013, his one-shot manga Drump was released in Weekly Shōnen Jump. In 2015, Takahashi received the Inkpot Award from Comic-Con International for his outstanding contributions to comics. In 2018, Takahashi published the limited series The Comiq in Weekly Shōnen Jump. Takahashi also wrote and illustrated a two-part manga, titled Secret Reverse, for the Marvel × Shōnen Jump+ Super Collaboration, which was released on Shōnen Jump+ in September 2019.

== Style ==
Takahashi's early art style was comical gekiga and influenced by traditional anime. Some illustrators such as Drew Struzan, Alphonse Mucha, and Norman Rockwell had a tremendous impact on Takahashi's later art style. His choices of traditional art tools were g-pen, watercolors and Copic markers, whereas Adobe Photoshop and Painter were the art programs he used during post manga serialization. During the later years, he furthered his drawing skills in Japanese ink wash artworks .

== Personal life ==
Takahashi enjoyed playing games such as shogi, mahjong, card games, and tabletop role-playing games.

Takahashi stated that his favorite manga from other authors included Doraemon and Mataro ga Kuru!! by Fujiko Fujio, Akira by Katsuhiro Otomo, JoJo's Bizarre Adventure by Hirohiko Araki, and Dragon Ball by Akira Toriyama. He also enjoyed reading American comics and stated that Hellboy was his favorite American comic book character. Takahashi was a great fan of wrestling and admired Antonio Inoki.

Takahashi's pet dog, a Shiba Inu named Taro (タロ), was the basis for the Yu-Gi-Oh! Trading Card Game monster card Shiba-Warrior Taro (柴戦士(しばせんし)タロ); the card's artwork was personally drawn by Takahashi. Takahashi also enjoyed sea diving and visited the Okinawa seaside each July.

Takahashi occasionally expressed his political views in his art, such as when he posted a drawing on Instagram of Yu-Gi-Oh! characters criticizing Shinzo Abe's government and asking his followers to "vote for justice" in the 2019 House of Councillors election. He later apologized.

=== Death ===
On July 6, 2022, Takahashi was found dead in the water 300 meters (980 ft) off the shore of Nago, Okinawa, by Japan Coast Guard officers following a civilian report from a passing boat. He was found wearing snorkeling gear, and his cause of death was determined to be drowning.

Later reports stated that Takahashi had died in the afternoon of July 4 while assisting in the rescue of three others who were caught in a rip current.

== Works ==
=== As Hajime Miyabi ===
- Ing! Love Ball (ING!ラブボール) (1981; one-shot, published in Shogakukan's Weekly Shōnen Sunday)
- Kyōgaku Sensen SOS!! (共学戦線SOS！！) (1982; one-shot, published in Shogakukan's Weekly Shōnen Sunday)
- Ano Ko ni Scramble (あの娘にスクランブル) (1982; one-shot, published in Shogakukan's Weekly Shōnen Sunday)
- Yū Yua Yū (勇ユア優) (1982; one-shot, published in Shogakukan's Weekly Shōnen Sunday)
- Hajimemashite Ran Desu!! (はじめまして蘭です！！) (1983; one-shot, published in Shogakukan's Weekly Shōnen Sunday)

=== As Kazuo Takahashi ===
- Gō-Q-Chōji Ikkiman (剛Q超児イッキマン) (1986; serialized in Kodansha's Weekly Shōnen Magazine)
- Tokiō no Taka (闘輝王の鷹) (1990; one-shot, published in Shueisha's Weekly Shōnen Jump)
- Battle Mind (バトルマインド) (1991; one-shot, published in Shueisha's Weekly Shōnen Jump)
- Tennenshoku Danji Buray (天燃色男児BURAY) (1991–1992; serialized in Shueisha's Weekly Shōnen Jump)

=== As Kazuki Takahashi ===
- Yu-Gi-Oh! (遊☆戯☆王) (1996–2004; serialized in Shueisha's Weekly Shōnen Jump)
- Drump (2013; one-shot, published in Shueisha's Weekly Shōnen Jump)
- The Comiq (2018; serialized in Shueisha's Weekly Shōnen Jump)
- Secret Reverse (2019; released on Shueisha's Shōnen Jump+)

==== Others ====
- Button (2010; released on Studio Dice official website)

3 episodes of anime shorts made by Takahashi.

== See also ==
- George Morikawa, Takahashi's mahjong companion and also a manga artist of Hajime no Ippo.
- Yasuichi Oshima, the manga artist that Takahashi worked with as a manga assistant.
