= Psyren =

Japanese manga series

- First tankōbon volume cover, featuring Ageha Yoshina (front) and Sakurako Amamiya (back)

サイレン (Sairen)
- Genre: Action; Science fiction; Supernatural
- Manga
- Written by: Toshiaki Iwashiro
- Published by: Shueisha
- English publisher: NA: Viz Media
- Imprint: Jump Comics
- Magazine: Weekly Shōnen Jump
- English magazine: NA: Shonen Jump
- Original run: December 3, 2007 – November 29, 2010
- Volumes: 16
- Anime television series
- Directed by: Katsumi Ono
- Written by: Shin Yoshida
- Music by: Takashi Ōmama; Tatsuhiko Saiki; Shū Kanematsu
- Studio: Satelight
- Licensed by: Remow
- Original network: Tokyo MX, BS11, Sun TV
- Original run: October 5, 2026 – present
- Episodes: 4
- icon

Psyren (Japanese: サイレン, Hepburn: Sairen) (stylized as PSYЯEN) is a Japanese manga series written and illustrated by Toshiaki Iwashiro. It was serialized in Shueisha's shōnen manga magazine Weekly Shōnen Jump from December 2007 to November 2010, with its chapters collected in 16 tankōbon volumes. The series follows Ageha Yoshina, a high school student chosen to compete in the Psyren games—a deadly contest set in another world.

In North America, Viz Media licensed the series for English release and serialized it in its Shonen Jump magazine.

An anime television series adaptation produced by Satelight premiered in October 2026.

== Plot ==
After defeating a bully for ¥10,000, Ageha Yoshina heads home, expecting a reprimand from his sister for breaking curfew. On the way, a nearby pay phone rings, and upon answering, he hears only his own echo. Dismissing it, he hangs up but discovers a mysterious calling card inscribed with the word Psyren. Intrigued, he visits his school's Occult Club and learns that Psyren is an urban legend promising a ¥500 million reward to anyone who uncovers its truth. Later, he finds a classmate's wallet—belonging to Sakurako Amamiya—which had been hidden by other students. Inside, he spots an identical Psyren card. After returning it, Sakurako flees, whispering "Save me" before vanishing. The next day, she is reported missing.

Determined to find her, Ageha calls the number on the card and undergoes an extensive quiz via pay phone. At the end, he is asked if he wishes to enter Psyren. The following day, while fleeing two impostor police officers, his phone rings. Answering it, he is abruptly transported to Psyren—a desolate wasteland overrun by monstrous creatures called Taboo, later revealed to be former humans transformed by the organization W.I.S.E. A mysterious voice, Nemesis Q, assigns missions to participants, warning that failure to comply means being trapped in Psyren forever.

Upon their first arrival, newcomers are given strict rules: avoid the towers, never lose their cards, complete the game before the number on the card reaches zero, and never speak of Psyren to outsiders. Exposure to Psyren's polluted air alters the Drifters' brains, unlocking latent psychic abilities known as PSI at the cost of severe physical strain. PSI manifests in three forms: Enhance (physical augmentation), Blast (external energy projection), and Trance (mental manipulation).

As the game progresses, Ageha and his companions encounter a group of psychically gifted children raised by Elmore Tenjuin, the elderly woman behind the ¥500 million bounty. Each child possesses unique PSI abilities and traumatic pasts, trained by Tenjuin to oppose W.I.S.E. Ageha trains with them, honing his powers before being summoned back to Psyren.

Eventually, only Ageha, Sakurako, Hiryū Asaga, Oboro Mochizuki, and Kabuto Kirisaki remain. They receive further training from former Psyren participant Matsuri Yagumo and the Tenjuin Roots Orphanage children. Meanwhile, Miroku Amagi, a psychic from their timeline, is exposed as the leader of W.I.S.E and the architect of Japan's impending ruin. His actions reshape the Psyren timeline, ensuring the orphanage's survival in that dystopian future.

In the Psyren timeline, Mithra—a W.I.S.E psychic—reveals she has manipulated Miroku. She explains that the meteorite Promised Tear fused her with Ouroboros, a planet-consuming entity, and summons it to Earth. Before annihilation, Nemesis Q's overseer, Grigori #07, returns the group to their original timeline. Ageha and his allies intercept W.I.S.E before they secure Promised Tear. Ageha provides Miroku with a card from Grigori #07, showing him the catastrophic future. Together, they defeat Mithra, but Ageha falls into a coma.

While unconscious, Grigori #07 contacts Ageha, revealing that in the Psyren timeline, Miroku and Grana sacrificed themselves to destroy Ouroboros and Mithra. Upon awakening, Ageha reunites with Sakurako and liberates Grigori #07 from captivity.

== Characters ==
=== The Resistance ===
Ageha Yoshina (夜科 アゲハ, Yoshina Ageha)
Voiced by: Takahiro Sakurai (vomic), Rikuya Yasuda (anime) (Japanese); Dylan Ray Owen, Dusty Feeney (young) (English)
A brash high school student who offers problem-solving services for ¥10,000. His childhood friendship with Sakurako fades until her disappearance draws him into Psyren, a lethal game that transports participants to a devastated future. Sakurako saves him during his first encounter with the world's monstrous Taboo creatures. He then begins rigorous training under her and veteran drifter Matsuri Yagumo's guidance to harness his emerging PSI abilities. Ageha gradually learns to control his dangerous powers and develop the strength to protect his friends, especially Sakurako. Eventually, he confesses his long-suppressed feelings for her.
Sakurako Amamiya (雨宮 桜子, Amamiya Sakurako)
Voiced by: Yui Horie (vomic), Mayuko Kazama (anime) (Japanese); Kelly Greenshield (English)
Ageha's childhood friend. She is a Psyren veteran whose whispered plea for help after he returns her stolen wallet draws him into the deadly game. She is known as the "Ice Queen" because of her aloof demeanor. Her isolation stems from being the sole survivor of multiple Psyren trips. Sakurako is a Trance specialist who manipulates minds and creates potent illusions. Her trauma manifests as the violent alternate personality Abyss, which harbors her repressed feelings for Ageha. His eventual confession helps her master Nova, splitting her into two synchronized fighters: her rational self and the aggressive Abyss, which she uses to defeat the powerful Shiner.
Hiryū Asaga (朝河 飛龍, Asaga Hiryū)
Voiced by: Shunsuke Takeuchi, Anna Nagase (young) (Japanese); Cory Yee, Zareen Afzaal (young) (English)
Asaga enters Psyren as a hardened fighter searching for his lost friend Tatsuo, though he later reveals a surprising connection to Ageha—they were elementary school classmates, with Asaga being the very crybaby Ageha once protected. This tough exterior hides his deeper motivations, as he adopts the "Dragon" moniker to become worthy of Tatsuo's memory. As a natural PSI prodigy, Asaga's abilities evolve significantly. First, he manifests a draconic tail. Then, he develops wings that can generate hurricane-force winds. Ultimately, he achieves a complete dragon form. Matsuri recognizes Asaga's unique potential and privately notes that he is the only one capable of neutralizing Ageha or Oboro, if necessary. Asaga chooses to remain in Psyren's ruined world and becomes a key leader in the resistance against W.I.S.E. He eventually reunites with Tatsuo to defend Tenju Root.
Oboro Mochizuki (望月 朧, Mochizuki Oboro)
Voiced by: Soma Saito (Japanese); Ethan Marshall (English)
A present-day idol who receives a calling card from Nemesis Q and attempts to warn the public on a talk show, only to be silenced. He develops PSI powers, specializing in healing allies and later demonstrating the ability to kill Taboo by dissolving them on contact. Notably swift when using Enhance, he forms a particular attachment to Ageha, offering to "hug him any time" if injured. During training with Matsuri, Oboro completes the session effortlessly. He later resurfaces at W.I.S.E's stronghold after surviving a fatal wound by using Cure to assimilate multiple Taboo Illumina cores, gaining a new ability called "Harmonious"—allowing him to manipulate and absorb life energy. Kabuto regards him as dangerously unstable and untrustworthy, a sentiment shared by his comrades due to his erratic behavior. After the final battle in Psyren, Oboro returns unharmed—spared from disintegration when the Illumina cores were deactivated—and resumes his idol career.
Kabuto Kirisaki (霧崎 カブト, Kirisaki Kabuto)
Voiced by: Yukihiro Nozuyama (Japanese); Ryan Negrón (English)
A former playboy who habitually avoided conflicts to maintain his peace. Initially portrayed as greedy—indebted to his uncle for thousands of yen—he resolves to change after a pivotal conversation. During the group's second expedition to Psyren, he joins as a newcomer seeking fortune. Kabuto possesses the precognitive PSI ability "Menace", which alerts him to impending danger and enables him to evade attacks. He later develops "YoYo", an invisible avatar comparable to Nemesis Q that both deflects incoming assaults and returns them with amplified force. This ability's invisibility frequently leads others to mistake Kabuto for a telekinetic.

=== W.I.S.E ===
Miroku Amagi (天戯 弥勒, Amagi Miroku)
A mysterious figure who impersonates Inui's deceased brother, manipulating him into funding W.I.S.E, an organization bent on reshaping the world. His psychic ability, Sephirot, allows him to generate destructive trees of light, including the lethal "Gevurah"—an attack that annihilated the Elmore Wood children, as seen in a recovered videotape. Strongly implied to have caused the Uroboros meteor impact, Miroku hunts survivors, turning them into Taboo. He is the younger twin of Nemesis Q's creator and a former Grigori test subject (#06). During the Resistance's assault on Astral Nova, he summons a massive luminous tree. Though defeated by Ageha's Nova ability, Miroku reveals his true goal: the tree's final stage, "Keter", will spawn new life to replace all existence. Before this can occur, Mithra betrays him, disclosing her allegiance to Quat Nevas, a planet-devouring entity, and that Miroku's scheme has provided the energy needed to consume Earth.
Grana (グラナ, Gurana)
Grana serves as leader of W.I.S.E's Star Commanders, distinguished by his eyepatch and notoriously absentminded nature. His advanced telekinetic PSI ability enables extraordinary feats, including reconstructing entire buildings from scattered debris within minutes. His signature technique, "Sun Fall", manipulates photons to generate a concentrated disintegration beam. As the original Grigori prototype (designated #01), Grana was genetically engineered and developed from fetal stage. He dispatches subordinates Shiner and Dholaki to capture Ageha for W.I.S.E. Historical records later identify him as responsible for the deaths of Matsuri and Kagetora in the future timeline.
Junas (ジュナス, Junasu)
The second W.I.S.E member introduced. He appears as a helmeted teenager with a distinctive finned crest. A skilled swordsman designated as Grigori experiment #05, he possesses the PSI ability "Bishamon-Mura", creating hundreds of floating swords that fragment into cutting shards. His secondary technique, "Bishamon-Tsubute", channels attacks through bladed weapons. Junas accompanies Dholaki and Miroku in declaring war across both future timelines. He infiltrates a disbanded orphanage as a janitor to recruit Caprico. During the assault on Tenju's Root, he nearly kills Ageha before Asuka intervenes using the Nova ability.
Uranus (ウラヌス, Uranusu)
Also known as Grigori #03, is a youthful Psychicer and product of the Grigori research facility. His PSI ability "Deep Freeze" grants complete ice manipulation, enabling him to: create ice firearms that freeze targets on impact; form ice skates for mobility; and alter environments. Originally a government assassin tracking escaped subjects, Uranus joined W.I.S.E after Grana defeated him. As Star Commander No. 3 (replacing Junas' previous position), he later criticized Junas' failed assault on Tenju's Roots. Uranus was ultimately killed by Kyle and Frederica during the Resistance's Astral Nova liberation campaign.
Shiner (シャイナ, Shaina)
The third W.I.S.E member introduced. He serves as head of their PSI Research Division. Despite his calm demeanor and curious nature, he possesses the lethal "Hexagonal Transfer System" PSI ability, enabling instant teleportation for combat. He develops particular interest in Ageha's capabilities. After suffering defeat, Shiner retreats to his tower, killing a Taboo witness to preserve his dignity. This incident prompts self-reflection about potential fear motivating his retreat. As Star Commander No. 4 in the revised timeline (with Uranus holding No. 3), Shiner dies during the Astral Nova liberation when Sakurako executes him using her Nova ability.
Dholki (ドルキ, Doruki)
Voiced by: Nobuyuki Hiyama
The first W.I.S.E member introduced. He serves as head of their Border Security Division. Distinguished by his long silvery hair, large-collared coat, and bird-like visor, he possesses the explosive PSI ability "Explosia" capable of generating massive detonations and disrupting PSI waves. Following his initial defeat by Ageha's "Melchsee's Door", he dangerously implants a second core to increase his power despite minimal survival odds. Dholaki appears in multiple timelines, including overseeing Tatsuo's core implantation and declaring war alongside Junas and Miroku. After attacking Matsuri in Psyren and later confronting Ageha's group, his enhanced abilities initially overpower Ageha before Kyle destroys both his cores, resulting in his death.
Eiji Kise (鬼瀬鋭二, Kise Eiji) / Vigo (ヴィーゴ, Vīgo)
A psychotic killer recruited into W.I.S.E alongside Grigori #03. With elongated limbs and a warped artistic vision, he murders victims as part of his self-proclaimed "art". His PSI ability "Zone Diver" enables phasing through solid objects and merging with environments—allowing him to manipulate his form, trap targets, or transform them into statues. In the future timeline as Vigo, he joins the elite Scourge unit's assault on Tenju's Roots. After developing an obsession with Marie, he engages Shao in combat, surviving a broken neck to kidnap her. Vigo is ultimately killed by Mithra during his attempt to "save" Marie.
Caprico (カプリコ, Kapuriko)
The fourth W.I.S.E member introduced. He heads the organization's Biological Research Division. Identifiable by her youthful appearance and star-shaped forehead scar, she exhibits the unique ability to animate her drawings. Many wild Taboo creatures are believed to be her creations or Illumina core mutations. Originally from a disbanded orphanage, she gained her powers after surviving a cliff fall. Miroku refers to her as "the Creator". When recruited by Junas—who encourages her forbidden drawing—she develops an immediate attachment that blossoms into deep affection by the Psyren timeline. This bond ultimately convinces Kagetora to spare Junas' life.
Mithra (ミスラ, Misura)
A mysterious member of W.I.S.E's Council of Elders, appearing as a young woman with a cracking, meteor-like physiology resembling the Ouroboros impactor. She exhibits several psychic abilities: "Bonfire" for tracking PSI users and telepathic communication (marked by will-o'-wisp flames), precognition similar to Kabuto and Elmore Tenjuin, and a practice of addressing individuals by their PSI ability names rather than personal names. She develops an interest in Marie after Vigo brings her to Astral Nova, seeking to use her as a new host body. Mithra demonstrates her precognitive abilities by correctly predicting Yusaka's betrayal of W.I.S.E, informing Miroku telepathically of his death shortly after it occurs.
Yusaka Aoi (遊坂 葵, Aoi Yusaka)
A dark-skinned, slender W.I.S.E operative who infiltrates Kouichi Iba's circle as Miroku's spy. Despite his friendly facade, he harbors violent psychopathic tendencies. His PSI ability "Candyman" generates poisonous insects through self-injection of toxins and transmits deadly viruses through touch. In the original timeline, Yusaka infected Matsuri with a fatal virus, indirectly causing her and Kagetora's deaths. During a confrontation with Yoshina and Amamiya, Yusaka was mortally wounded by Ageha's Melzez Vortex technique. He ultimately detonated nitroglycerin to destroy the laboratory before dying.
Quat Nevas (クァト ネヴァス, Kuato Nevasu)
A primordial planet-consuming entity that predates humanity. Serving as the true master behind Mithra and the central antagonist of the series, it patiently awaited Miroku's energy production during the Psyren timeline to enable its consumption of Earth.

=== Tenju's Root ===
Elmore Tenjuin (天樹院エルモア, Tenjuin Erumoa)
Voiced by: Reiko Suzuki (Japanese); Wendy Powell (English)
A clairvoyant Psychicer in modern-day Japan who seeks to prevent Psyren's catastrophic future. Using her Millennium Kaleidoscope ability, she foresaw Japan's impending destruction and offered ¥500 million to anyone who could decipher Psyren's mysteries. With her late husband Koper—a mind-reading Psyren drifter—she achieved fame and fortune through fortune-telling before retiring to mentor psychically-gifted orphans at Elmore Wood. Koper perished when attempting to reveal Psyren's secrets, though Elmore glimpsed the Nemesis Q calling card in his final moments. Originally fated to die in a plane crash (averted by Ageha's intervention), Elmore later leads the resistance group Tenju's Root in the future timeline. She sustains fatal injuries during W.I.S.E's assault on their base while trying to protect Marie, ultimately succumbing to her wounds despite Van's healing efforts.
Frederica (フレデリカ, Furederika)
Frederica is a pyrokinetic blonde with a volatile temperament, initially portrayed as spoiled and brash. Her self-proclaimed codename "Ravishing Rose" reflects her dramatic personality. After accidentally burning down her home during a childhood illness, she developed her fire-based ability "Pyro Queen". Though initially hostile toward outsiders—particularly Ageha—she eventually teaches him the "Blast Stream" technique. Her tsundere personality softens over time, showing growing affection for Marie and even Kabuto, despite their rocky relationship. In the alternate future, she enhances her powers through the "Salamandra" program. During the Astral Nova liberation, Grana critically wounds her in battle.
Marie (マリー, Marī)
A shy, kind-hearted telekinetic who contrasts sharply with her brash friend Frederica. Her refined abilities allow precise environmental manipulation while protecting allies. During Ageha's training at Elmore Wood, she develops romantic feelings for him. In the future timeline, Marie assumes leadership of Tenju's Root through a rock-paper-scissors selection process. W.I.S.E eventually kidnaps her during their assault on the organization.
Kyle (カイル, Kairu)
A mischievous yet powerful youth with a facial scar inflicted by Miroku. He shares a brotherly bond with Ageha, often seeking his companionship. His PSI ability "Material High" generates nearly invisible solid constructs through air compression, though he considers Enhance his primary skill, granting superhuman speed and strength in the future timeline.
Shao (シャオ)
A composed Chinese youth with tracking expertise. His PSI ability "Shinra-Banshou" (All Creation) detects and manipulates surrounding psychic energy, revealing individuals' intrinsic nature—visualizing Sakurako as "seven blades", Oboro as a "white sea", and Ageha as a "starry sky". In the future timeline, he develops PSI-nullification capabilities and harbors romantic feelings for Marie.
Van Tenjuin (天樹院 ヴァン, Tenjuin Van)
Voiced by: Ayumu Murase (Japanese); Madeleine Morris (English)
A reserved healer with a fondness for sweets, demonstrated when sharing his dessert with Frederica. In the future timeline, his personality shifts dramatically to become talkative and emotionally expressive—a change stemming from becoming the sole remaining healer after Ian's death. His abilities advance significantly, enabling limb regeneration within his "Cure Zone". He occasionally speaks French.
Lan Shinonome (東雲 嵐, Shinonome Ran)
A Psychicer recruited by Kyotada Inui for his unique "Trick Room" ability, which enables untraceable item transportation through dimensionally-linked boxes. Motivated by his comatose sister's medical expenses, he assists Inui's operations. In the future timeline, Lan joins Tenju's Root, using his ability to transport key members including Ageha and Marie to their hideout.
Haruhiko Yumeji (夢路 晴彦, Yumeji Haruhiko)
Haruhiko is an electrokinetic Psychicer recruited by Kyotada for underworld financial operations. His "Shocker" ability powers Tenju's Root's infrastructure in the future timeline, where he serves as the base's primary defender. Haruhiko styles himself as the Root's protective "deity", using enhanced electrical manipulation to repel attacks. His powers prove instrumental during the team's infiltration of a Psyren tower.
Chika Shinonome (東雲 千架, Shinonome Chika)
Chika Shinonome is Lan Shinonome's comatose younger sister, whose medical condition motivates his criminal cooperation with Inui. After future recovery through Ian's healing, she joins Tenju's Root. While presumed psychic like her brother, her abilities are undisclosed. She shares Matsuri's motorcycle proficiency.

=== Other characters ===
Nemesis Q (ネメシスQ, Nemeshisu Kyū) / Voice Guidance (音声案内, Onsei An'nai)
Voiced by: Yōko Hikasa (Japanese); Abigail Blythe (English)
An intelligent PSI program sent from the future to identify and train individuals capable of preventing Psyren's occurrence. Created by Miroku Amagi's twin sister—a Psychicer abducted by the government at age six—the program was designed when her physical body proved unable to withstand time travel. Q enforces secrecy by eliminating those who disclose Psyren's existence. The program shows particular interest in Ageha due to his significant potential, granting him special consideration during temporal transfers, which seamlessly displace subjects from their original timeline.
Matsuri Yagumo (八雲 祭, Yagumo Matsuri)
Voiced by: Yūko Kaida (Japanese); Luci Christian (English)
A renowned concert pianist and veteran Psyren drifter, mentors younger Psychicers while maintaining her musical career and unconventional lifestyle. With an expired Psyren card, she operates in an advisory capacity, known for her playful demeanor and motorcycle-riding habits. A master of Blast-type PSI, Matsuri demonstrates exceptional telekinetic prowess, capable of countering Ageha's Melzez Door attacks. Recognized by Grana as an "Almighty Type" combatant, her unique battle rhythm and emotional control compensate for physical limitations. Though ultimately disappearing in the future timeline, Grana posthumously acknowledges she might have defeated him at full strength, solidifying her legacy as one of Psyren's most formidable Psyren Drifters.
Kagetora Hyōdō (雹堂 影虎, Hyōdō Kagetora)
A master of Enhance-type PSI and self-proclaimed strongest user in eastern Japan. He is Matsuri's devoted ally and frequent marriage proposer (rejected 22 times). His gangster-like appearance—slicked hair, sunglasses, and printed shirts—belies a gentle nature; he adores cats, Mont Blanc cake, and refuses to harm women or children. Though unaware of Psyren's specifics, he assists Matsuri in training new Psyren Drifters.
Tatsuo Mana (真名 辰央, Mana Tatsuo)
Voiced by: Gakuto Kajiwara (Japanese); Austin Tindle (English)
Afflicted with a hereditary illness, Tatsuo initially resents the world and enters Psyren alone after Asaga refuses his invitation. Transformed into a Taboo via implanted core, he massacres survivors using a PSI-powered rifle before Ageha's intervention restores his consciousness. A dual Blast/Enhance user, Tatsuo remains trapped in Psyren without a return card, aware his core will eventually expire. He redeems himself by saving Asaga from Taboo, and later aids the Resistance. During W.I.S.E's assault on Tenju's Root, he manipulates Hiryu's dragon PSI to pierce the artificial darkness, destroying local Taboo with sunlight.
Ian (イアン)
A naturally gifted Cure user and Matsuri's longtime friend. He conceals his abilities to maintain a peaceful life. Despite proposing to Matsuri twelve times without success, he remains devoted, respecting her secrecy about Psyren. After Matsuri and Kagetora's deaths in the original timeline, he exhausts his powers saving thirty critically wounded individuals, resulting in his own death and Van's succession as healer. In the revised future, Ian marries Fubuki Yoshina and fathers Marco, but W.I.S.E captures the family during their assault on Tenju's Roots. Marco later frees the prisoners as reinforcements arrive. Ian also mentors Van and Kabuto in Cure techniques across both timelines.
Fubuki Yoshina (夜科 フブキ, Yoshina Fubuki)
Voiced by: Riho Sugiyama
Ageha's older sister and guardian. She maintains strict discipline through harsh methods including physical punishment. She harbors admiration for idol Oboro Mochizuki. In the revised future timeline, she marries Ian and bears a son, Marco, before W.I.S.E captures the family during their attack on Tenju's Roots.
Asuka Yoshina (夜科 朱鳥, Yoshina Asuka)
A 47-year-old astronomer and father of Ageha and Fubuki, initially struggled with parenting after his wife's death. Though typically composed, he employs strict discipline and maintains surprising physical strength, reportedly from online karate training. After temporarily disowning Ageha over unexplained absences, he later aids in defending Tenju's Root against W.I.S.E. His gravity-manipulation PSI ability creates a spherical field that weakens enemy powers and distorts spacetime, slowing time within its range. Ageha speculates this latent ability explains Asuka's youthful appearance. While capable of accessing the enhanced "Nova" state, prolonged use risks neurological damage.
Yūsuke Kusakabe (日下部 雄介, Kusakabe Yūsuke)
A mysterious Psyren inhabitant with an inhuman appearance who collaborates with Tatsuo to weaken W.I.S.E's atmospheric membrane. Their strategy involves creating vulnerable points that allow sunlight to penetrate, which would be fatal for Illumina core-enhanced individuals. As a former W.I.S.E. employee, Kusakabe possesses the unique PSI ability to communicate with technology. He uses this ability to infiltrate the organization's Neural Control Programme.

== Media ==
=== Manga ===
Written and illustrated by Toshiaki Iwashiro, Psyren was serialized in Shueisha's shōnen manga magazine Weekly Shōnen Jump from December 3, 2007, to November 29, 2010. Shueisha collected its 161 chapters in 16 tankōbon volumes, released from May 2, 2008, to March 4, 2011.

In North America, Viz Media announced the license to the manga in April 2010 and the first chapter appeared in the January 2011 issue of the North American version of Shonen Jump. The 16 volumes were released from October 4, 2011, to May 6, 2014.

=== Light novel ===
A light novel written by SOW and illustrated by Iwashiro, titled Psyren: Another Call 1 – Birth of the Crimson Lotus (PSYREN－サイレン－ another call 1 紅蓮の聖誕, Sairen Another Anazā Kōru Wan Guren no Seitan), was released on September 3, 2010. It includes various short stories about the characters. A second volume, titled Psyren: Another Call 2 – The Future Is in Your Hands (PSYREN－サイレン－ another call 2 未来は君の手の中に, Sairen Another Anazā Kōru Tsu Mirai wa Kimi no Te no Naka ni), was released on March 4, 2011. It focuses on different epilogue stories that detailed the futures and lives of the characters.

=== Anime ===
An anime television series adaptation was announced in Weekly Shōnen Jump on December 15, 2025. The series will be produced by Satelight and directed by Katsumi Ono, with Shin Yoshida handling series composition, Akira Ōkuma designing the characters, and Takashi Ōmama, Tatsuhiko Saiki and Shū Kanematsu composing the music. It premiered on October 5, 2026, on Tokyo MX and BS11. The opening theme song is "Warning!!", performed by Clan Queen, and the ending theme song is "Icarus", performed by Who-ya Extended. Remow has licensed the series for streaming on Crunchyroll.

== Reception ==
Volumes from Psyren have commonly appeared in Japan's best-selling lists of manga volumes. It ranked tenth on AnimeJapan's "Most Wanted Anime Adaptation" poll in 2024. Collider's Lucas Kloberdanz-Dyck placed Psyren at the top of his 10 Most Underrated Manga list, calling it a flawless blend of striking visuals and compelling storytelling, emphasizing that the series is an essential read, worthy of far greater recognition.
