= Toshiaki Iwashiro =

Japanese manga author and illustrator (born 1977)

- 岩代 俊明
- Iwashiro at Global Stage Hollywood 2026
- Born: December 11, 1977 (age 48); Kanagawa Prefecture
- Occupation: Manga artist
- Notable work: Psyren; Mieru Hito

Toshiaki Iwashiro (岩代 俊明, Iwashiro Toshiaki; born December 11, 1977) is a Japanese manga author and illustrator. He is the creator of the manga series Psyren and Mieru Hito, both serialized in Weekly Shōnen Jump.

After creating the one-shot manga Godland Company, and Sakuran (Tentative), Iwashiro's series Kagamigami was also serialized in Weekly Shōnen Jump before its cancellation. His latest work, the one-shot manga, Hoshikuzu no Sorakil, was published in Shonen Jump GIGA in 2017. Several of Iwashiro's notable assistants are Ryūhei Tamura (Beelzebub), Yūki Tabata (Black Clover), and Naoya Matsumoto (Kaiju No. 8).

Iwashiro is native to Kanagawa Prefecture.

== Works ==
=== One-shots ===
- Mieru Hito (みえるひと) (2003, Jump the Revolution)
- Mieru Hito (みえるひと) (2004, Weekly Shōnen Jump)
- Dog Child -Kudoh- (狗童 -KUDOH-) (2004, Akamaru Jump 2004 Summer)
- Godland Company (2011, Jump NEXT!)
- Sakuran (Tentative) (さくらん (仮)) (2013, Weekly Shōnen Jump)
- Shikigami Twilight Days (式神トワイライトデイズ) (2014, Weekly Shōnen Jump)
- Sorakil, The Scum of the Galaxy (星クズのソラキル, Hoshikuzu no Sorakil) (2017, Shōnen Jump GIGA)

=== Series ===
- The 10th Division - Version 1 (2003, Weekly Shōnen Jump)
- The 10th Division - Version 2 (2004, Weekly Shōnen Jump)
- Mieru Hito (みえるひと) (2005-2006, Weekly Shōnen Jump)
- Psyren (PSYREN -サイレン-) (2007-2010, Weekly Shōnen Jump)
- Kagamigami (カガミガミ) (2015, Weekly Shōnen Jump)
