= Hiroshi Ōsaka =

Japanese animator

Hiroshi Ōsaka (逢坂 浩司, Ōsaka Hiroshi; 20 June 1963 – 24 September 2007) was a Japanese animator, character designer and illustrator, born in Neyagawa, Osaka Prefecture. He was a graduate of the Kyoto Saga University of Arts. He was the co-founder of Bones.

== Biography ==
Ōsaka, while studying in the Kyoto Saga University of Arts, joined the animation subcontracting studio Anime R in 1983 on a part-time basis under the apprenticeship of the noted animator Moriyasu Taniguchi, working on numerous Sunrise productions during this period in college.

At his time at the studio, Ōsaka worked with numerous noted animators, including Kazuaki Mōri, Masahiro Kase, Tōru Yoshida, Hiroyuki Okiura and Kazuchika Kise, many of whom who went on to found Production I.G, and also supervised Takahiro Kimura. He left Anime R in 1991 to work as a freelance animator, going on to work on several Sunrise shows as well as other productions. Ōsaka, along with fellow animator Toshihiro Kawamoto and producer Masahiko Minami, co-founded the studio Bones in 1998.

In 1999, Ōsaka lectured on an animation workshop at the 4th Animation Kobe event, held in Kobe, Hyōgo Prefecture. An anime fan, he had wanted to be an animator since his high school days, being inspired by Sunrise's iconic 1979 series Mobile Suit Gundam and the works of the manga artist Mitsuru Adachi.

During the spring of 2007, Ōsaka's health had deteriorated and spent his remaining days in his hometown of Neyagawa, Osaka Prefecture, where he had been staying at his family residence. He had been recuperating in a hospital in the city, where he later died of cancer on September 24, aged 44. His death was reported on several news outlets, including the blogs of his animator colleagues and major national newspapers, with numerous fans paying condolences.

== Works ==
=== Anime television ===
- Armored Trooper Votoms (in-between animation)
- Panzer World Galient (in-between animation)
- Sei Jūshi Bismarck (animation director and key animation)
- Seikimatsu Kyūseishu Densetsu: Hokuto no Ken (key animation)
- Ninja Senshi Tobikage (key animation)
- Blue Comet SPT Layzner (key animation)
- City Hunter (key animation)
- Lemon Angel (animation director)
- Yoroiden Samurai Troopers (animation director and key animation)
- Jūshin Liger (animation director)
- City Hunter 3 (animation director)
- Yawara! (animation director and key animation)
- Dragon Quest (animation director and key animation)
- Obatarian (animation director)
- Mobile Suit Victory Gundam (character design, animation director, key animation, OP)
- Shippū! Iron Leaguer (key animation)
- Mobile Fighter G Gundam (character design, animation director, key animation, in-between animation, OP)
- The Brave of Gold Goldran (animation director)
- Fushigi Yūgi (animation director)
- City Hunter Special: The Secret Service (key animation)
- The Vision of Escaflowne ((chief) animation director, key animation, OP)
- Master of Mosquiton (key animation)
- Bakusō Kyōdai Let's & Go!! (key animation)
- Cowboy Bebop (animation director, animation direction coordination, key animation, ED)
- Hiwou War Chronicles (Character design, chief animation director, animation director, OP/ED)
- Angelic Layer (animation director, animation direction assistance, key animation, OP/ED)
- Hajime no Ippo (animation director)
- RahXephon (animation director, animation direction assistance, key animation)
- Scrapped Princess (key animation)
- Fullmetal Alchemist (animation direction assistance)
- Wolf's Rain (animation director, animation direction coordination, key animation, OP)
- Mars Daybreak (character design, animation director, storyboards, key animation, OP)
- Kurau Phantom Memory (key animation)
- Jyu Oh Sei (character design, chief animation director, OP/ED)
- Ouran High School Host Club (layout animation director, key animation)
- Tenpō Ibun Ayakashi Ayashi (guest character design, character supervision, animation director, animation direction coordination, key animation, OP)

=== OVA ===
- Dream Hunter Rem (key animation) 18+
- Dream Hunter Rem Special Version (key animation)
- Dream Hunter Rem II (animation director)
- Kikō Kai Galient: Tetsu no Monshō (key animation)
- Aoki Ryūsei SPT Layzner: ACT-III Kokuin 2000 (key animation)
- Black Magic M-66 (key animation)
- Captain Power: Battle Training Video Type 2, 3 (key animation)
- Pony Metal U-Gaim (key animation)
- Dream Hunter Rem III (animation director)
- Cream Lemon: Special Dark (character design, animation director) 18+
- New Cream Lemon (key animation) 18+
- Good Morning Althea (mecha animation director)
- Yoroiden Samurai Troopers: Gaiden (key animation)
- Record of Lodoss War (key animation)
- Mobile Suit Gundam 0083 Stardust Memory (animation director, key animation)
- Bastard!! Ankoku no Hakai Shin (key animation)
- The Cockpit (key animation on the Sonic Boom Squadron sequence)
- Oira Uchū no Tankōfu (key animation)
- Macross Plus (animation direction assistance, key animation)
- Yamato Takeru ~After War~ (animation director)
- Golden Boy: Sasurai no O-Benkyō Yarō (animation director, key animation)
- Mobile Suit Gundam: The 08th MS Team (animation direction coordination, key animation, ED)
- Fullmetal Alchemist: Premium Collection (animation direction coordination)

=== Films ===
- Five Star Monogatari (key animation)
- City Hunter: Ai to Shukumei no Magnum (key animation)
- City Hunter: Bay City Wars (key animation)
- Garaga (key animation)
- Mobile Suit Gundam 0083 Zeon no Zankō (animation director, key animation)
- kidou senshi SD gan damu matsuri SD sengoku den tenka taihei hen ( genga )
- Macross Plus: Movie Edition (animation direction assistance, key animation)
- New Kimagure Orange Road: Summer's Beginning (key animation)
- Spriggan (key animation)
- Escaflowne (animation director, key animation)
- Jin-Roh (key animation)
- Cowboy Bebop: Knockin' on Heaven's Door (animation director)
- RahXephon Tagen Hensōkyoku (animation director)
- Fullmetal Alchemist: Conqueror of Shamballa (animation director)

=== Games ===
- Zoids: Full Metal Crash (character design)
- Mobile Suit Gundam: EX Revue (character design)
- Mobile Suit Gundam: Lost War Chronicles (character design)
- Mobile Suit Gundam: Encounters in Space (character design)
- Psychic Force 2012 (character design)
