= Toshihiro Kawamoto =

Japanese animator (born 1963)

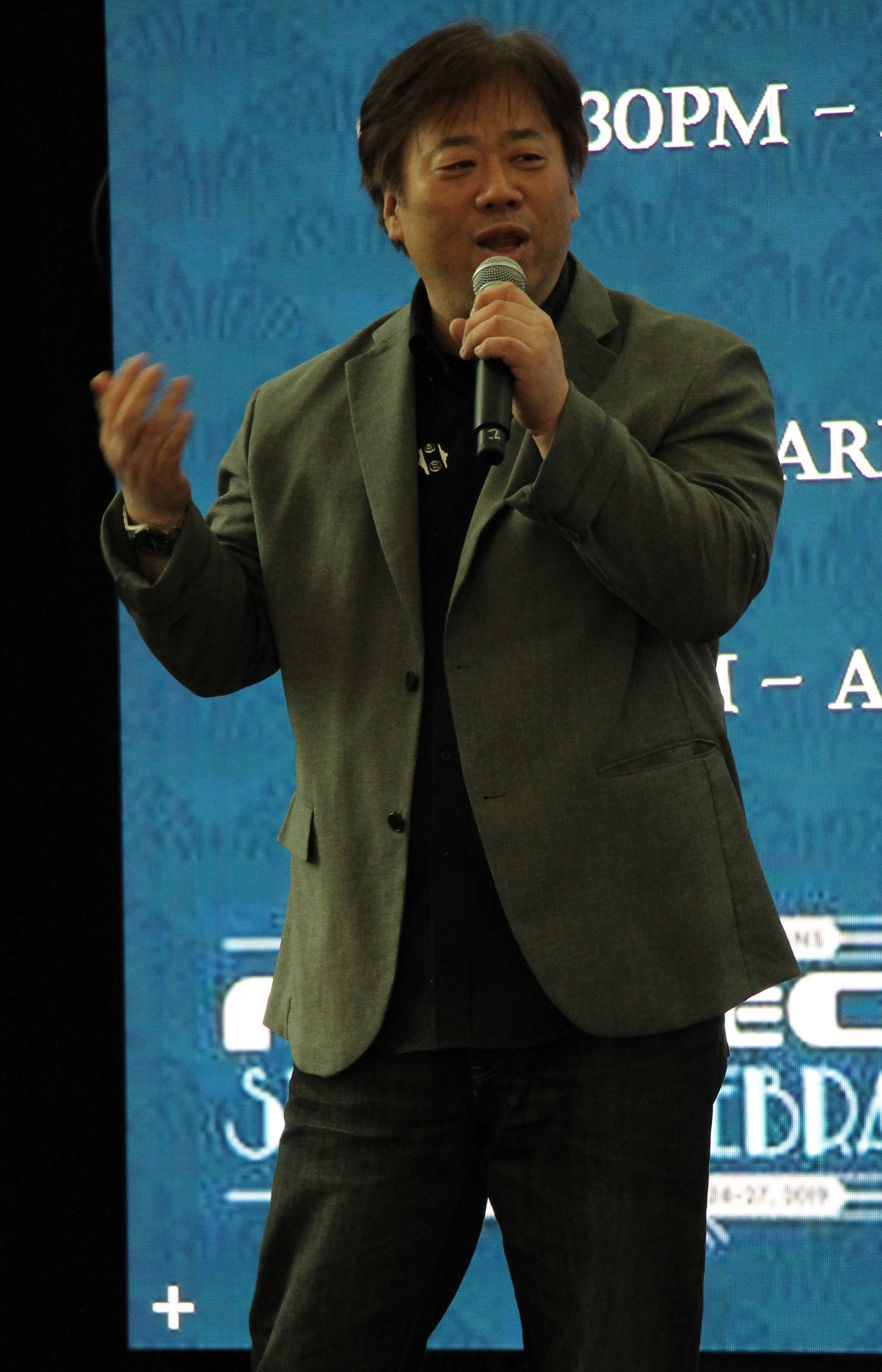
- Kawamoto in 2019.
- Born: July 15, 1963 (age 63); Mie Prefecture
- Citizenship: Japan
- Occupations: animator; anime director; character designer
- Years active: 1986–present
- Employers: Sunrise (1986–1998); Bones (1998–present)
- Notable work: Cowboy Bebop; Fullmetal Alchemist; Wolf's Rain; Eureka Seven; See § Works

Toshihiro Kawamoto (川元 利浩, Kawamoto Toshihiro; born July 15, 1963) is a Japanese animator. He is the co-founder and director of the anime studio Bones. He was the character designer and animation director of Cowboy Bebop.

== Biography ==
=== Early period ===
Born in Mie Prefecture, upon graduating from high school, Kawamoto was first employed in the making and designing of precision machinery. During this early period, he became interested in becoming an animator due to the ongoing Macross series, Yoshiyuki Tomino's Mobile Suit Gundam and Gainax's amateur Daikon films. In particular, Yoshikazu Yasuhiko's character designs were a major influence. Within a year, Kawamoto left his previous profession and enrolled in the Nagoya branch of Tokyo Designer Gakuin College (currently known as Nagoya Designer Gakuin), which he attended for two years.

=== Career ===
After graduating from college, he applied for a job at Group Donguri and was accepted. In 1986, he made his debut in Yasuhiko's 1986 film Arion, where he was supervised by Yoshinobu Inano and mentored by the lead character designer Sachiko Kamimura, with whom he later collaborated on numerous productions, including being her assistant in Venus Wars, which was also directed and written by Yasuhiko. Soon after, he began working in numerous other Sunrise series, being the lead character designer in the Gundam OVA series Mobile Suit Gundam 0083: Stardust Memory and Mobile Suit Gundam 0083: Last Blitz of Zeon, Mobile Suit Gundam: The 08th MS Team and Cowboy Bebop. While designing the characters for Bebop, Kawamoto modeled the character of Ed on composer Yoko Kanno, Spike Spiegel on Arsène Lupin III and City Hunter, and Ein on a friend's dog, from a suggestion by writer Keiko Nobumoto.

In 1998, he co-founded Bones with fellow Sunrise staff members Masahiko Minami and Hiroshi Ōsaka. He has recently provided the character designs for Wolf's Rain and Tenpō Ibun Ayakashi Ayashi, and the key animation to series such as Eureka Seven, Witch Hunter Robin, Sword of the Stranger, Fullmetal Alchemist, Ouran High School Host Club and Michiko to Hatchin.

On March 11, 2010, Anime Expo announced Kawamoto will be an official Guest of Honor at the July Anime Expo at the Los Angeles Convention Center.

== Works ==
- 1986 - Arion (in-between animation)
- 1986 - Mobile Suit Gundam ZZ (key animation)
- 1987 - Metal Armor Dragonar (key animation)
- 1988 - Mobile Suit Gundam: Char's Counterattack (key animation)
- 1989 - Venus Wars (assistant animation director, key animation)
- 1989 - Mobile Suit Gundam 0080: War in the Pocket (animation director)
- 1989 - City Hunter 3 (key animation)
- 1990 - City Hunter: Bay City Wars (key animation)
- 1991 - Mobile Suit Gundam F91 (co-animation director)
- 1991 - Mobile Suit Gundam 0083: Stardust Memory (character design, animation director)
- 1992 - Mobile Suit Gundam 0083: Last Blitz of Zeon (character design, animation director)
- 1993 - Super Dimension Century Orguss 02 (character design)
- 1993 - The Cockpit (character design, animation director)
- 1994 - Mobile Fighter G Gundam (OP key animation, key animation)
- 1994 - Oira Uchū no Tankōfu (character design, animation director)
- 1995 - Golden Boy (character design, animation director)
- 1995 - Memories (key animation)
- 1995 - Sega Saturn Mobile Suit Gundam game (animation director of anime parts)
- 1996 - Mobile Suit Gundam: The 08th MS Team (character design)
- 1997 - Crystania: Legend of the Mercenaries ~Prelude~ (illustrator)
- 1998 - PlayStation Ghost in the Shell game (animation director and key animation of anime parts)
- 1998 - Cowboy Bebop (character design, animation director)
- 1999 - Blood: The Last Vampire (key animation)
- 2000 - Escaflowne (animation director, key animation)
- 2001 - Cowboy Bebop: Knockin' on Heaven's Door (character design, animation director)
- 2001 - Kidō Tenshi Angelic Layer (OP key animation)
- 2002 - RahXephon (OP key animation, key animation)
- 2002 - Witch Hunter Robin (OP key animation)
- 2003 - Wolf's Rain (character design)
- 2003 - Fullmetal Alchemist (anime) (OP and ED key animation)
- 2003 - Scrapped Princess (key animation)
- 2004 - Kurau Phantom Memory (animation director)
- 2004 - Kenran Butōsai: The Mars Daybreak (animation director)
- 2005 - Eureka Seven (OP key animation)
- 2005 - Fullmetal Alchemist: Conqueror of Shamballa (key animation)
- 2006 - Ouran High School Host Club (key animation)
- 2006 - Jyu Oh Sei (key animation)
- 2006 - Tenpō Ibun Ayakashi Ayashi (character design)
- 2007 - Sword of the Stranger (co-animation director, key animation)
- 2008 - Nijū Mensō no Musume (OP and ED key animation)
- 2008 - Michiko to Hatchin (animation director, key animation)
- 2009 - Fullmetal Alchemist: Brotherhood (OP key animation)
- 2010 - Heroman (chief animator, animation director, OP animation director)
- 2011 - Gosick (character design)
- 2011 - Towa no Quon (character design)
- 2013 - Tenkai Knights (main character design, OP key animation)
- 2014 - Noragami (character design, chief animation director)
- 2014 - Space Dandy (animation director)
- 2015 - Blood Blockade Battlefront (character design)
- 2016 - My Hero Academia (animation director, key animation)
- 2016 - Mob Psycho 100 (key animation)
- 2020 - Josee, the Tiger and the Fish (animation director, key animation)
- 2021 - SK8 the Infinity (key animation)
- 2021 - Eden (character design)
- 2024 - Metallic Rouge (character design)

=== Artbooks ===
- 2004 - Toshihiro Kawamoto:COWBOY BEBOP Illustrations ~ The Wind ~ (SoftBank Creative)
- 2006 - Toshihiro Kawamoto Artworks The Illusives I&II (SoftBank Creative)

=== Games ===
- 1993 - Mobile Suit Gundam: Return of Zion (FamilySoft) (character design)
- 1993 - Mobile Suit Gundam: A Year of War Ichi-nen Sensō (FamilySoft) (character design)
- 1994 - Wonder Project J: Kikai no Shōnen Pīno (Square Enix) (character design)
- 2002 - Gigantic Drive (Square Enix) (character design)
- 2003 - Bujingai (original character design)
- 2002 - Mobile Suit Gundam: Lost War Chronicles (Bandai) (character design)
- 2005 - Tales of the Abyss (OP key animation)
