= Bones (studio) =

Japanese animation studio

Bones Inc.
- Logo used since 2005

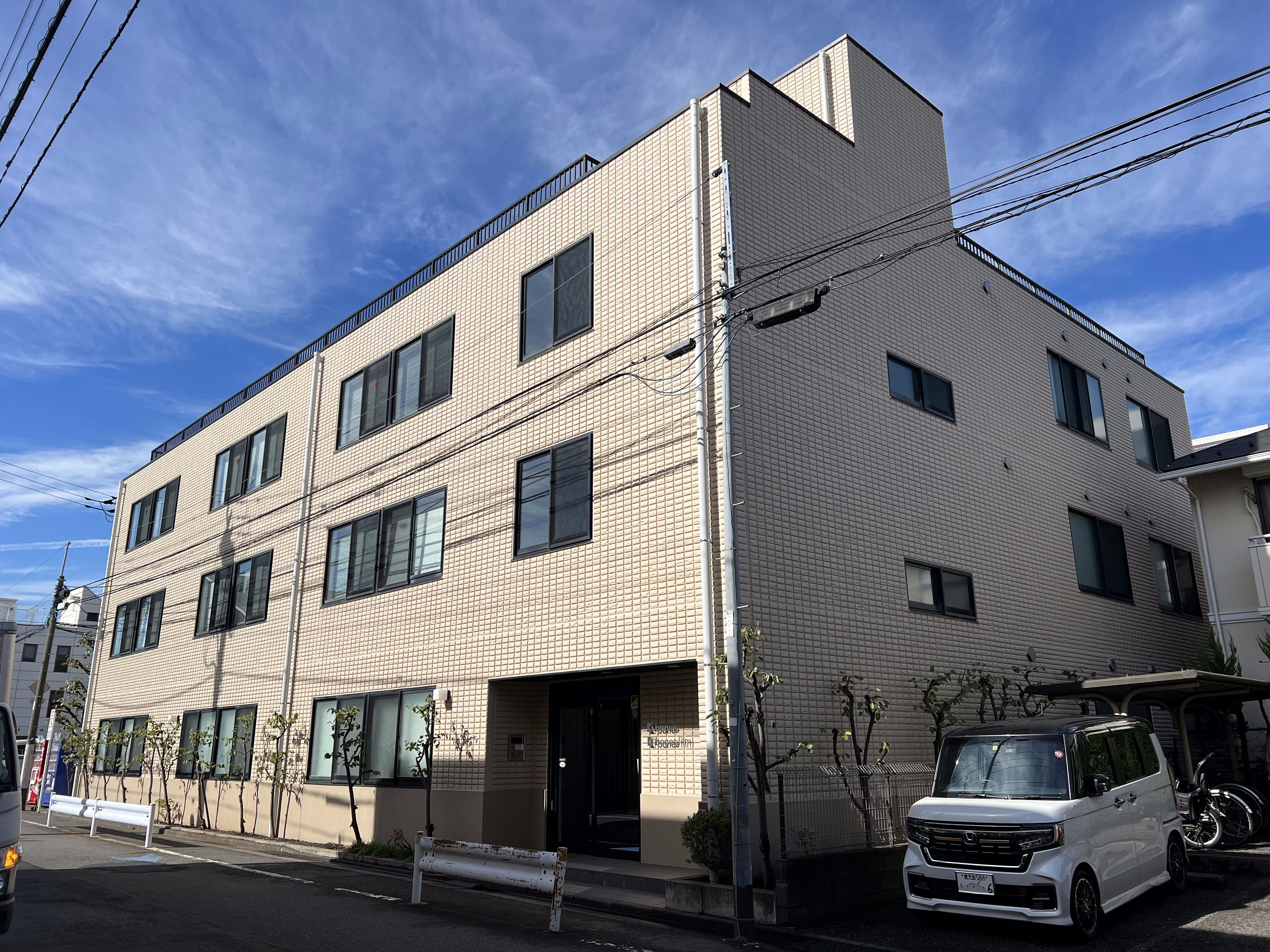
- Headquarters in Suginami, Tokyo
- Native name: 株式会社ボンズ
- Romanized name: Kabushiki-gaisha Bonzu
- Type: Kabushiki gaisha
- Industry: Japanese animation
- Founded: October 1998; 28 years ago
- Headquarters: 3-8-3 Igusa, Suginami, Tokyo, Japan
- Key people: Masahiko Minami; Hiroshi Ōsaka; Toshihiro Kawamoto
- Number of employees: 110 (as of March 2025)
- Subsidiaries: Bones Film
- Website: www.bones.co.jp

Bones Film Inc.
- Native name: 株式会社ボンズフィルム
- Romanized name: Kabushiki-gaisha Bonzu Firumu
- Type: Subsidiary
- Industry: Anime
- Founded: October 1, 2024; 2 years ago
- Headquarters: 3-8-3 Igusa, Suginami, Tokyo, Japan
- Key people: Yoshihiro Oyabu; Masahiko Minami
- Owner: Bones
- Divisions: Animation Department (Note: Bones Animation Department (ボンズ作画部), occasionally credited as BONES作画部, the studio's animation department.); Photography Department (Note: Bones Photography Department (ボンズ撮影部), the studio's compositing and visual effects department.)
- Website: bones.co.jp/work/bonesfilm

Bones Inc. (Japanese: 株式会社ボンズ, Hepburn: Kabushiki-gaisha Bonzu) is a Japanese animation studio, with headquarters located in Igusa, Suginami, Tokyo. It has produced numerous series, including RahXephon, No. 6, Wolf's Rain, Scrapped Princess, Eureka Seven, Angelic Layer, Darker than Black, Soul Eater, Ouran High School Host Club, both the 2003 and 2009 adaptations of Fullmetal Alchemist, Star Driver, Gosick, Mob Psycho 100, Space Dandy, Noragami, Bungo Stray Dogs, Gachiakuta, and My Hero Academia.

== History ==
Bones was founded by Sunrise staff members Masahiko Minami, Hiroshi Ōsaka and Toshihiro Kawamoto in October 1998. One of their first projects was collaborating with Sunrise on Cowboy Bebop: Knockin' on Heaven's Door, a feature film based on the Cowboy Bebop anime series.

According to Minami, the studio's name was chosen as a reference to its staff count at the time (8), which he described as being "like bones" while citing the desire to "work hard and put on some flesh".

In 2007, the studio suffered the loss of co-founder Hiroshi Ōsaka, well known for his works as character designer on series such as Mobile Suit Victory Gundam, Mobile Fighter G Gundam and The Mars Daybreak. Ōsaka had been battling with cancer, and died from the disease on September 24, 2007. He was 44 years old.

After the death of Ōsaka, two new additions have been made to the studio's board of directors: Makoto Watanabe and Takahiro Komori. Komori is well known as a character designer and animator who has been with the studio since its inception. His previous works as designer consist of Angelic Layer, Scrapped Princess, and Darker than Black.

In October 2024, Bones spun-off its production division under a separate, wholly owned subsidiary known as Bones Film. As such, all productions from 2025 onward are credited to Bones Film.

== Studios ==
Like studio Sunrise, where some of its founders previously worked, Bones Film is divided into smaller studios which are focused on their own anime projects.

- Studio A: Led by producer Naoki Amano; mainly known for Gosick, Wolf's Rain, Angelic Layer, Hiwou War Chronicles, Noragami and Carole & Tuesday. It's currently working on Gachiakuta.
- Studio B: Led by producer Tatsuya Saitō; mainly known for Eureka Seven, RahXephon, Space Dandy, and Mob Psycho 100. It's currently working on My Hero Academia: Vigilantes.
- Studio C: Led by producer Yoshihiro Ōyabu; mainly known for Fullmetal Alchemist, Darker than Black: The Black Contractor, Soul Eater, Ouran High School Host Club and My Hero Academia.
- Studio D: Led by producer Nobuhito Takemoto; mainly known for Fullmetal Alchemist: Brotherhood and No. 6. Currently working on Bungo Stray Dogs and Daemons of the Shadow Realm.
- Studio E: Known for the Eureka Seven: Hi-Evolution trilogy and Metallic Rouge. It's currently working on Marriagetoxin.
- Studio F: The newest studio; It's currently working on an unknown new project as of 2024.

== Productions ==
=== Anime television series ===
Year	Title	Director(s)	Eps.	Studio	Note(s)
2000–2001	Hiwou War Chronicles	Tetsurō Amino	26	A	Original work.
2001	Angelic Layer: Battle Doll	Hiroshi Nishikiori	26	A	Based on a manga by CLAMP.
2002	RahXephon	Yutaka Izubuchi	26	B	Original work.
2003	Wolf's Rain	Tensai Okamura	30	A	Original work.
2003	Scrapped Princess	Sōichi Masui	24	B	Based on a light novel by Ichirō Sakaki.
2003–2004	Fullmetal Alchemist	Seiji Mizushima	51	C	Based on a manga by Hiromu Arakawa. Features a partially anime original storyline.
2004	Mars Daybreak	Kunihiro Mori	26	B	Original work.
2004	Kurau Phantom Memory	Yasuhiro Irie	24	A	Original work.
2005–2006	Eureka Seven	Tomoki Kyoda	51	B	Original work.
2006	Ouran High School Host Club	Takuya Igarashi	26	C	Based on a manga by Bisco Hatori.
2006	Jyu-Oh-Sei	Hiroshi Nishikiori	11	A	Based on a manga by Natsumi Itsuki.
2006–2007	Ghost Slayers Ayashi	Hiroshi Nishikiori; Yoshikazu Miyao (assistant)	25	A	Original work.
2007	Darker than Black: The Black Contractor	Tensai Okamura	25	C	Original work.
2007	Skull Man	Takeshi Mori	13	B	Based on a manga by Shotaro Ishinomori.
2008–2009	Soul Eater	Takuya Igarashi	51	C	Based on a manga by Atsushi Ōkubo.
2008	Chiko, Heiress of the Phantom Thief	Nobuo Tomisawa	22	N/A	Based on a manga by Shinji Ohara (co-production with Telecom Animation Film).
2009–2010	Fullmetal Alchemist: Brotherhood	Yasuhiro Irie	64	D	Second adaptation of Hiromu Arakawa's Fullmetal Alchemist manga.
2009	Tokyo Magnitude 8.0	Masaki Tachibana	11	N/A	Original work (co-production with Kinema Citrus).
2009	Darker than Black: Gemini of the Meteor	Tensai Okamura	12	C	Sequel to Darker Than Black.
2010	Heroman	Hitoshi Nanba	26	A	Original work in collaboration with Stan Lee.
2010–2011	Star Driver	Takuya Igarashi	25	C	Original work.
2011	Gosick	Hitoshi Nanba	24	A	Based on a light novel by Kazuki Sakuraba.
2011	No. 6	Kenji Nagasaki	11	D	Based on the novels by Atsuko Asano.
2011	Un-Go	Seiji Mizushima	12	C	Based on the works of Ango Sakaguchi.
2012	Eureka Seven: AO	Tomoki Kyoda	24	A/B	Sequel to Eureka Seven.
2012–2013	Blast of Tempest	Masahiro Andō	24	D	Based on a manga by Kyō Shirodaira.
2013	Otona Joshi no Anime Time: Life's Best 10	Miura You	1	B	Episode 3 of Otona Joshi no Anime Time television specials.
2013–2014	Tenkai Knights	Mitsuru Hongo	52	C	Original work. First run in United States, on Cartoon Network.
2014	Space Dandy	Shinichirō Watanabe (chief); Shingo Natsume	13	B	Original work. First run in United States, on Adult Swim's Toonami programming block.
2014	Noragami	Kotaro Tamura	12	A	Based on the manga by Adachitoka.
2014	Captain Earth	Takuya Igarashi	24	C	Original work.
2014	Soul Eater Not!	Masakazu Hashimoto	12	A	Based on a manga by Atsushi Ōkubo; Spin-off to Soul Eater.
2014	Chaika - The Coffin Princess	Soichi Masui	12	D	Based on a light novel by Ichirō Sakaki.
2014	Space Dandy 2	Shinichirō Watanabe (chief); Shingo Natsume	13	B	First run in United States, on Adult Swim's Toonami programming block.
2014	Chaika - The Coffin Princess: Avenging Battle	Soichi Masui	10	D	
2015	Blood Blockade Battlefront	Rie Matsumoto	12	A/C	Based on the manga by Yasuhiro Nightow
2015	Show by Rock!!	Takahiro Ikezoe	12	D	Based on a video game by Geechs and Sanrio.
2015	Snow White with the Red Hair	Masahiro Andō	12	B	Based on the manga by Sorata Akizuki.
2015	Noragami Aragoto	Kotaro Tamura	13	A	
2015	Concrete Revolutio	Seiji Mizushima	13	C	Original work.
2016	Snow White with the Red Hair 2	Masahiro Andō	12	B	
2016	Concrete Revolutio: The Last Song	Seiji Mizushima	11	C	
2016	My Hero Academia	Kenji Nagasaki	13	A	Based on the manga by Kōhei Horikoshi.
2016	Bungo Stray Dogs	Takuya Igarashi	12	D	Based on the manga by Kafka Asagiri.
2016	Show by Rock!! Short!!	Takahiro Ikezoe	12	D	Short anime based on Show by Rock!!.
2016	Mob Psycho 100	Yuzuru Tachikawa	12	B	Based on the manga by One.
2016	Show by Rock 2!!	Takahiro Ikezoe	12	D	
2016	Bungo Stray Dogs 2	Takuya Igarashi	12	D	
2017	My Hero Academia 2	Kenji Nagasaki	25	C	
2017	Blood Blockade Battlefront & Beyond	Masato Takayanagi	12	B	
2018	My Hero Academia 3	Kenji Nagasaki	25	C	
2018	Dragon Pilot: Hisone and Masotan	Shinji Higuchi (chief); Hiroshi Kobayashi	12	A	Original work.
2019	Mob Psycho 100 II	Yuzuru Tachikawa	13	B	
2019	Carole & Tuesday	Shinichirō Watanabe (chief); Motonobu Hori	24	A	Original work.
2019	Bungo Stray Dogs 3	Takuya Igarashi	12	D	
2019–2020	My Hero Academia 4	Kenji Nagasaki (chief); Masahiro Mukai	25	C	
2021	SK8 the Infinity	Hiroko Utsumi	12	D	Original work.
2021	Bungo Stray Dogs Wan!	Toshihiro Kikuchi	12	N/A	Based on the spin-off manga of Bungo Stray Dogs by Kafka Asagiri. (co-production with Nomad)
2021	My Hero Academia 5	Kenji Nagasaki (chief); Masahiro Mukai	25	C	
2021	Godzilla Singular Point	Atsushi Takahashi	13	A	Original work in the Godzilla franchise (co-production with Orange).
2021–2022	The Case Study of Vanitas	Tomoyuki Itamura	24	A	Based on the manga by Jun Mochizuki.
2022–2023	My Hero Academia 6	Kenji Nagasaki (chief); Masahiro Mukai	25	C	
2022	Mob Psycho 100 III	Yuzuru Tachikawa (chief); Takahiro Hasui	12	B	
2023	Bungo Stray Dogs 4	Takuya Igarashi	13	D	
2023	Bungo Stray Dogs 5	Takuya Igarashi	11	D	
2024	Metallic Rouge	Motonobu Hori	13	E	Original work.
2024	My Hero Academia 7	Kenji Nagasaki (chief); Naomi Nakayama	21	C	
2024	The Magical Girl and the Evil Lieutenant Used to Be Archenemies	Akiyo Ohashi	12	D	Based on the manga by Cocoa Fujiwara.
2025	My Hero Academia: Vigilantes	Kenichi Suzuki	13	B	Based on the spin-off manga of My Hero Academia by Hideyuki Furuhashi and Betten Court.
2025	Gachiakuta	Fumihiko Suganuma	24	A	Based on the manga by Kei Urana.
2025	My Hero Academia 8	Kenji Nagasaki (chief); Naomi Nakayama	11	C	
2026	My Hero Academia: Vigilantes 2	Kenichi Suzuki	13	B	
2026	Daemons of the Shadow Realm	Masahiro Andō	24	D	
2026	Marriagetoxin	Motonobu Hori	13	E	Based on the manga by Joumyaku and Mizuki Yoda.
2026	Bungo Stray Dogs Wan! 2	Toshihiro Kikuchi	12	N/A	Co-production with Nomad.
2027	Marriagetoxin 2	Motonobu Hori	TBA	E	
2027	Fate Rewinder	Rie Matsumoto	TBA	TBA	Based on the manga by Fūta Kimura.
TBA	SK8 the Infinity 2	Hiroko Utsumi	TBA	D	
TBA	Gachiakuta 2	TBA	TBA	A	
TBA	Daemons of the Shadow Realm 2	Masahiro Andō	TBA	D	

=== Anime films ===
Year	Title	Director(s)	Dur.	Studio	Note(s)
2000	Escaflowne	Kazuki Akane	98m	B	
2001	Cowboy Bebop: The Movie	Shinichirō Watanabe	115m	B	
2003	RahXephon: Pluralitas Concentio	Tomoki Kyoda	115m	B	
2005	Fullmetal Alchemist the Movie: Conqueror of Shamballa	Seiji Mizushima	105m	C	
2007	Sword of the Stranger	Masahiro Andō	102m	B	
2009	Eureka Seven: Pocketful of Rainbows	Tomoki Kyoda (chief); Hiroshi Haraguchi	115m	N/A	Co-production with Kinema Citrus.
2011	Towa no Quon: The Ephemeral Petals	Umanosuke Iida; Takeshi Mori (assistant)	48m	B	
2011	Fullmetal Alchemist: The Sacred Star of Milos	Kazuya Murata	111m	D	
2011	Towa no Quon: Dancing Orchid in Chaos	Umanosuke Iida; Takeshi Mori (assistant)	48m	B	
2011	Towa no Quon: The Complicity of Dreams	Umanosuke Iida; Takeshi Mori (assistant)	48m	B	
2011	Towa no Quon: The Roaring Anxiety	Umanosuke Iida; Takeshi Mori (assistant)	48m	B	
2011	Towa no Quon: The Return of the Invincible	Umanosuke Iida; Takeshi Mori (assistant)	48m	B	
2011	Un-Go: Chapter of Inga	Seiji Mizushima	48m	C	
2011	Towa no Quon: Eternal Quon	Umanosuke Iida; Takeshi Mori (assistant)	48m	B	
2013	Star Driver: The Movie	Takuya Igarashi	150m	C	
2017	Eureka Seven: Hi-Evolution 1	Tomoki Kyoda (chief); Hisatoshi Shimizu	93m	E	
2018	Bungo Stray Dogs: Dead Apple	Takuya Igarashi	90m	D	
2018	My Hero Academia: Two Heroes	Kenji Nagasaki	96m	C	
2018	Anemone - Eureka Seven: Hi-Evolution	Tomoki Kyoda	94m	E	
2019	My Hero Academia: Heroes Rising	Kenji Nagasaki	104m	C	
2020	Josee, the Tiger and the Fish	Kotaro Tamura	98m	D	
2021	My Hero Academia: World Heroes' Mission	Kenji Nagasaki	104m	C	
2021	Eureka - Eureka Seven: Hi-Evolution	Tomoki Kyoda	116m	E	
2024	My Hero Academia: You're Next	Tensai Okamura	110m	B	

=== Original net animation ===
Year	Title	Director(s)	Eps.	Studio	Note(s)
2008–2009	Xam'd: Lost Memories	Masayuki Miyaji	26	B	PlayStation Network; Original work
2018	A.I.C.O. -Incarnation-	Kazuya Murata	12	A	Netflix; Original work
2021	Super Crooks	Motonobu Hori	13	B	Netflix; Based on the comic book series by Mark Millar
2024	Time Patrol Bon	Masahiro Andō	24	A	Netflix; Based on the manga series by Fujiko F. Fujio

=== Original video animation ===
- RahXephon Interlude: Her and Herself/Thatness and Thereness (August 7, 2003)
- Wolf's Rain (January 23, 2004 – February 25, 2004)
- Fullmetal Alchemist: Premium Collection (March 29, 2006)
- Ghost Slayers Ayashi: Ayashi Diving Comedy (August 22, 2007 – October 24, 2007)
- Darker than Black: Beneath the Fully Bloomed Cherry Blossoms (March 26, 2008)
- Fullmetal Alchemist Brotherhood (August 26, 2009 – August 25, 2010)
- Prototype (part of Halo Legends) (2010)
- Darker than Black: Gaiden (January 27, 2010 – July 21, 2010)
- Eureka Seven Ao: The Flowers of Jungfrau (September 20, 2012)
- Noragami (February 17, 2014 - July 17, 2014)
- Hitsugi no Chaika (March 10, 2015)
- Noragami Aragoto (November 17, 2015 - March 17, 2016)
- Snow White with the Red Hair (January 5, 2016)
- Blood Blockade Battlefront (June 3, 2016)
- Eureka Seven Ao:Final (January 2017)
- Bungo Stray Dogs (August 31, 2017)
- Mob Psycho 100 Reigen -The Miraculous Unknown Psychic- (March 18, 2018)
- My Hero Academia - All Might: Rising (February 13, 2019)
- Mob Psycho 100: The Spirits and Such Consultation Office's First Company Outing ~A Healing Trip that Warms the Heart~ (September 25, 2019)
- SK8 the Infinity Extra Part (March 19, 2025)

=== Video games ===
- Robot Alchemic Drive (Enix, November 4, 2002)
- Rahxephon Blu Sky Fantasia (Bandai, August 7, 2003)
- Fullmetal Alchemist and the Broken Angel (Square Enix, December 25, 2003)
- Fullmetal Alchemist: Stray Rondo (Bandai, March 25, 2004)
- Fullmetal Alchemist: Sonata of Memories (Bandai, July 22, 2004)
- Fullmetal Alchemist 2: Curse of the Crimson Elixir (Square Enix, September 22, 2004)
- Fullmetal Alchemist 3: The Girl Who Succeed God (Square Enix, July 21, 2005)
- Eureka Seven vol. 1: The New Wave (Bandai, October 27, 2005)
- Eureka Seven vol. 2: The New Vision (Bandai, May 11, 2006)
- Soul Eater: Monotone Princess (Square Enix, September 25, 2008)
- Fullmetal Alchemist: Prince of the Dawn (Square Enix, August 13, 2009)
- Fullmetal Alchemist: Daughter of the Dusk (Square Enix, December 10, 2009)
- Liberation Maiden (Part of Guild01; Level-5, May 31, 2012)
- Professor Layton vs. Phoenix Wright: Ace Attorney (Capcom/Level-5, November 29, 2012)
- Phoenix Wright: Ace Attorney - Dual Destinies (Capcom, July 25, 2013)
- Persona 4: Dancing All Night (Atlus, June 25, 2015)

=== Music videos ===
- Lotte music video「Baby I love you daze」 - Shinsekai by Bump of Chicken, Directed by Rie Matsumoto (December 11, 2018)
- Pokémon Special Music Video「GOTCHA！」- Acacia by BUMP OF CHICKEN, Directed by Rie Matsumoto (The Pokémon Company/Nintendo/Creatures Inc./GAME FREAK inc., September 29, 2020)
