= My Hero Academia: Vigilantes =

Japanese manga series by Hideyuki Furuhashi

- First tankōbon volume cover

ヴィジランテ -僕のヒーローアカデミア ILLEGALS- (Vijirante Boku no Hīrō Akademia Irīgarusu)
- Genre: Adventure; Science fantasy; Superhero
- Created by: Kōhei Horikoshi
- Manga
- Written by: Hideyuki Furuhashi
- Illustrated by: Betten Court
- Published by: Shueisha
- English publisher: NA: Viz Media
- Imprint: Jump Comics+
- Magazine: Jump Giga (August – October 2016); Shōnen Jump+ (October 2016 – May 2022)
- Original run: August 20, 2016 – May 28, 2022
- Volumes: 15
- Anime television series
- Directed by: Kenichi Suzuki
- Written by: Yōsuke Kuroda
- Music by: Yuki Hayashi; Shogo Yamashiro; Yuki Furuhashi
- Studio: Bones Film
- Licensed by: Crunchyroll; SA/SEA: Medialink
- Original network: Tokyo MX, BS NTV, ytv
- Original run: April 7, 2025 – March 30, 2026
- Episodes: 26
- icon

My Hero Academia: Vigilantes (Note: Japanese: ヴィジランテ -僕のヒーローアカデミア ILLEGALS-, Hepburn: Vijirante: Boku no Hīrō Akademia Irīgarusu) is a Japanese manga series written by Hideyuki Furuhashi and illustrated by Betten Court. It is both a spin-off and a prequel to Kōhei Horikoshi's manga series My Hero Academia. It was serialized in Shueisha's Jump Giga in August 2016, but was transferred to Shueisha's online magazine, Shōnen Jump+, in October of the same year, with its chapters additionally collected in 15 tankōbon volumes. An anime television series adaptation produced by Bones Film aired from April to June 2025. A second season aired from January to March 2026.

== Plot ==
My Hero Academia: Vigilantes takes place five years before the events of the main series. The story follows Koichi Haimawari, a young man who uses his Quirk to help others despite not being a licensed Hero. After he and the street performer Kazuho Haneyama are attacked by a group of thugs, they are saved by the strong vigilante Knuckleduster, who recruits Koichi and Kazuho to become vigilantes themselves.

== Media ==
=== Manga ===
Written by Hideyuki Furuhashi and illustrated by Betten Court, My Hero Academia: Vigilantes started in Shueisha's Jump Giga magazine on August 20, 2016, and was transferred to Shōnen Jump+ in October of that year. The series ended on May 28, 2022. Shueisha has collected its chapters into individual tankōbon volumes. The first volume was released on April 4, 2017, and the 15th and final volume was released on July 4, 2022. A "special arc" one-shot manga was published in Shonen Jump+ on April 15, 2025. The series is licensed for the English-language release in North America by Viz Media.

==== Volumes ====
No.	Original release date	Original ISBN	English release date	English ISBN
1	April 4, 2017	978-4-08-881093-5	July 3, 2018	978-1-9747-0159-9
1. "I'm Here" (俺がいる, Ore ga Iru); 2. "Takeoff" (離陸(テイクオフ), Teikuofu); 3. "Nice Guy Reborn" (親切マン改, Shinsetsu Man Aratame); 4. "Honesty" (素顔, Sugao); 5. "Bee" (蜂, Hachi)
2	September 4, 2017	978-4-08-881249-6	October 2, 2018	978-1-9747-0185-8
6. "No Need to Hold Back" (手加減無用, Tekagen Muyō); 7. "Top Runner" (トップランナー, Toppu Ran'nā); 8. "Him" ("あの人"のこ, "Ano Hito" no Koto); 9. "Judgment" (断罪, Danzai); 10. "Scream" (悲鳴, Himei); 11. "Crossing Lines" (一線, Issen)
3	February 2, 2018	978-4-08-881335-6	January 1, 2019	978-1-9747-0257-2
12. "Senpai" (先輩, Senpai); 13. "Truth" (真, Makoto); 14. "Major"; 15. "Playboy"; 16. "Mom Descends" (猛母襲来!, Mō Haha Shūrai!); 17. "Tag Team!" (タッグ結成!, Taggu Kessei!); 18. "Force of Will Acceleration!" (気合いで加速!, Kiai de Kasoku!)
4	April 4, 2018	978-4-08-881428-5	April 2, 2019	978-1-9747-0436-1
19. "Family" (家族, Kazoku); 20. "Event Announcement!" (イベント開催!, Ibento Kaisai!); 21. "Ensemble, Assemble!" (ユニット結成!, Yunitto Kessei!); 22. "The Day Of" (本番当日, Honban Tōjitsu); 23. "Daughter" (娘, Musume); 24. "A Father-Daughter Talk" (親子の会話, Oyako no Kaiwa); 25. "Goodbye to Dad" (パパにさよなら, Papa ni Sayonara); 26. "Tamao" (珠緒)
5	September 4, 2018	978-4-08-881547-3	July 2, 2019	978-1-9747-0772-0
27. "Business as Usual" (俺たちのいつものシゴト, Oretachi no Itsumo no Shigoto); 28. "What a Man Takes with Him" (男がその手に取るものは, Otoko ga Sono Te ni toru Mono wa); 29. "Equipment Issues" (武装検討, Busō Kentō); 30. "Cooperation Request" (協力要請, Kyōryoku Yōsei); 31. "Day-Tripping Down to Naniwa!" (浪花の街に出張やで!, Naniwa no Machi ni Shutchō ya de!); 32. "Idols Keep Their Secrets!" (アイドルには秘密があんねん!, Aidoru ni wa Himitsu ga An Nen!); 33. "Stumbling into Nasty Business!" (ヤバいモンめっけたで!, Yabai Mon mekketa de!); 34. "Crabtastic Rampage!" (カニカニ大暴走や!, Kanikani Dai Bōsō ya!); 35. "Blown-Up Hero?! See Ya Later!" (ヒーロー爆発!? ほな､さいなら!, Hīrō Bakuhatsu!? Hona, Sainara!)
6	February 4, 2019	978-4-08-881739-2	October 1, 2019	978-1-9747-1053-9
36. "Must-Have Merchandise" (これがみんなの欲しいモノ!, Kore ga Min'na no Hoshī Mono!); 37. "Public and Private" (公と私と, Kō to Watashi to); 38. "High-Speed" (超速!, Chōsoku!); 39. "A Rational Man" (合理的な男, Gōriteki na Otoko); 40. "A Rational Team-Up" (合理的に共闘, Gōriteki ni Kyōtō); 41. "Ultimate Move!" (必殺!!, Hissatsu!!); 42. "Mixer" (合コンに行くよ, Gōkon ni iku yo); 43. "Casanova" (モテ期が来たよ, Moteki ga kita yo); 44. "One Outrageous Traveler" (法外の旅行者, Hōgai no Ryokōsha)
7	August 2, 2019	978-4-08-881839-9	June 2, 2020	978-1-9747-1066-9
45. "The Man Returns" (帰ってきた男, Kaettekita Otoko); 46. "Christmas Eve Hero" (聖夜の英雄(ヒーロー), Seiya no Hīrō); 47. "Farewell Party!" (いざ お別れ会!, Iza o Wakare-kai!); 48. "Investigation Start! Steamy Romance Spotted?!" (捜査開始!→熱愛発覚!?, Sōsa Kaishi! Netsuai Hakkaku!); 49. "Zero Hour" (ゼロ・アワー, Zero Awā); 50. "Defend the Tower!" (タワーを守れ!, Tawā o Mamore!); 51. "I Do What I Can" (人事を尽くせ!, Jinji o Tsukuse!); 52. "Balloon Soul" (フーセンの心, Fūsen no Kokoro); 53. "Limits and Catastrophe" (限界と破局, Genkai to Hakyoku)
8	December 4, 2019	978-4-08-882090-3	November 3, 2020	978-1-9747-1763-7
54. "Hotline" (ホットライン, Hottorain); 55. "This is a Hero!!" (これがヒーロー!!, Kore ga Hīrō!!); 56. "I'm No Hero" (英雄に非ず, Eiyū ni arazu); 57. "Explosive Man" (爆弾になる男, Bakudan ni naru Otoko); 58. "International Flight Home" (国際線 帰国便, Kokusaisen Kikoku-bin); 59. "Rain and Cloud" (雨と雲, Ame to Kumo); 60. "Taking in a Stray" (迷い猫 預かります, Mayoi neko Azukarimasu); 61. "Two as One" (ふたりでひとり, Futari de Hitori); 62. "Glass Sky" (ガラスの空, Garasu no Sora)
9	March 4, 2020	978-4-08-882240-2	March 2, 2021	978-1-9747-1979-2
63. "Find that Resolve" (覚悟を決めろ, Kakugo o kimero); 64. "Fight on, Shota" (がんばれショータ, Ganbare Shōta); 65. "A Sky with No Rain Left" (雨上がりの空に, Ameagari no Sora ni); 66. "Graduation and Career Path" (卒業と進路, Sotsugyō to Shinro); 67. "Professional / International / Spicy Curry" (本格･国際･辛口カレー, Honkaku Kokusai Karakuchi Karē); 68. "I'd Better Not Lose" (負けるな あたし, Makeruna Atashi); 69. "Hero on the Scene" (ヒーロー登場, Hīrō tōjō); 70. "True Self" (ほんとの自分, Honto no Jibun); 71. "Thanks for the Guidance" (ご指導どうも, Go shidō dōmo); 72. "Searching for You" (君を探して, Kimi o Sagashite)
10	September 4, 2020	978-4-08-882395-9	July 6, 2021	978-1-9747-2293-8
73. "The Queen Descends" (女王光臨, Joō Kōrin); 74. "After the Storm" (嵐のあと, Arashi no ato); 75. "Letter" (手紙, Tegami); 76. "Deadly Weapon" (凶器, Kyōki); 77. "Strategy" (作戦, Sakusen); 78. "Dispatch" (出動, Shutsudō); 79. "Inferno Number Two" (INFERNO No. 2); 80. "Who's That Now?" (それは誰だ, Sore wa Dareda); 81. "Bee My Pop"
11	January 4, 2021	978-4-08-882484-0	November 2, 2021	978-1-9747-2516-8
82. "High-Speed Hero II" (超速ヒーローII, Chōsoku Hīrō Tsū); 83. "Earthbound Perp" (咎人 地に在りて, Togabitochi ni Arite); 84. "Dreams of a Hero" (英雄の夢, Eiyū No Yume); 85. "Questioning" (尋問, Jinmon); 86. "Masked Fighting Tournament" (仮面武闘会, Kamen butō-kai); 87. "RAP RAP RAP" (RAP RAP RAP, RAP RAP RAP); 88. "Hidden Face, Bare Ears" (頭隠して耳隠さず, Atamakaku Shite Mimi Kakusazu); 89. "Super-Smashing Tiger Bunny!" (乱闘! タイガーバニー, Rantō! Taigābanī); 90. "Team-Up in the Underground" (チームアップ in the UG(アンダーグラウンド), Chīmuappu in the Andāguraundo); 91. "Dash Ahead to Plan B" (走るプランB, Hashiru Puran B)
12	April 2, 2021	978-4-08-882610-3	April 5, 2022	978-1-9747-2716-2
92. "Might Signal" (マイトシグナル, Maito Shigunaru); 93. "Three-Second Back-and-Forth" (3秒の攻防, San-yō no Kōbō); 94. "Underground Roots" (地下茎, Chikakei); 95. "Moon" (月, Tsuki); 96. "Negotiations" (交渉, Kōshō); 97. "Pursuers" (追手, Otte); 98. "Irrational Persuasion Technique" (合理的説得法, Gōri-teki Settoku-hō)
13	October 4, 2021	978-4-08-882747-6	September 6, 2022	978-1-9747-3237-1
99. "Faceless Invasion" (無貌の侵略, Mubō no Shinryaku); 100. "Detonate!" (超爆!, Kibaku!); 101. "Soar into the Night" (夜を翔ける, Yoru o Kakeru); 102. "Intruder" (侵入者, Shin'nyū-sha); 103. "Should've Aimed for the Head" (脳を撃てば, Nō o Uteba); 104. "This Face" (この顔, Kono Kao); 105. "Commence Operation Escape" (逃走開始, Tōsō Kaishi); 106. "Crawler Chase"; 107. "Hundred-Hit Rush" (連打百遍, Renda Hyaku-ben)
14	May 2, 2022	978-4-08-882859-6	May 9, 2023	978-1-9747-3665-2
108. "Dweller of the Depths" (深淵に棲むもの, Shin'en ni Sumu Mono); 109. "Besieged" (包囲網, Hōi-mō); 110. "Careless" (油断, Yudan); 111. "Return of the Fist" (鉄拳復活, Tekken Fukkatsu); 112. "Blunder and Consequence" (誤算の果て, Gosan no Hate); 113. "Ultimate Villain" (最悪の敵, Saiaku no Teki); 114. "Dogfight" (ドッグファイト, Doggufaito); 115. "Treatise on Power" (力の結論, Chikara no Ketsuron); 116. "Final Lesson" (最後の教え, Saigo no Oshie)
15	July 4, 2022	978-4-08-883177-0	October 10, 2023	978-1-9747-4064-2
117. "Gotta Be the Bad One" (これは絶対ダメなやつ, Kore wa Zettai Damena Yatsu); 118. "Golden Age" (楽しい時間, Kogane Jidai); 119. "Until Then, I'm..." (だから俺が, Dakara Ore ga); 120. "Rootin' For Ya!" (応援, Ōen); 121. "Backup on the Scene" (援軍到着, Engun Tōchaku); 122. "One-Two Finish" (ワンツー・フィニッシュ, Wan Tsū Finisshu); 123. "Bye-Bye, Hero" (バイバイ ヒーロー, Bai Bai Hīrō); 124. "Always Have, Always Will" (ずっとずっと, Zutto Zutto); 125. "Futures for All" (それぞれの未来, Sorezore no Mirai); 126. "The Skycrawler Rising" (ザ・スカイクロウラー：ライジング, Za Sukaikurōrā: Raijingu)

=== Anime ===
An anime television series adaptation was announced at the Jump Festa '25 event on December 22, 2024. It is produced by Bones Film and directed by Kenichi Suzuki, with Yōsuke Kuroda writing the scripts, Takahiko Yoshida designing the characters, and Yuki Hayashi, Shogo Yamashiro, and Yuki Furuhashi composing the music. The series aired from April 7 to June 30, 2025, on Tokyo MX and other networks. The opening theme song is "Kekka Orai" (けっかおーらい; All's Well in the End), performed by Kocchi no Kento, while the ending theme song is "Speed" (スピード), performed by yutori. Crunchyroll is streaming the series. Medialink licensed the series in South, Southeast Asia and Oceania (except Australia and New Zealand) for streaming on Ani-One Asia's YouTube channel.

Following the first season's final episode, a second season was announced and aired January 5 to March 30, 2026. The opening theme song is "Catch", performed by Surii, while the ending theme song is "Miss You", performed by shytaupe. Crunchyroll is streaming the second season.

==== Episodes ====
===== Season 1 (2025) =====
No. overall	No. in season	Title	Directed by	Storyboarded by	Original release date
1	1	"I'm Here"; Transliteration: "Ore ga Iru" (Japanese: 俺がいる)	Kenichi Suzuki	Kenichi Suzuki	April 7, 2025
Koichi Haimawari is a first-year college student who possesses the "Slide and Glide" Quirk, which allows sliding movement at about the speed of a bicycle. Due to this Quirk's restrictions, Koichi laments its lack of usefulness, and some onlookers liken the Quirk's movement to that of a cockroach. On his way to his part-time job at a convenience store, he watches street performer Pop☆Step put on a show using her "Leap" Quirk, and later is harassed by a group of thugs he encountered earlier, led by Soga Kugazaki. To let out his frustrations, Koichi dons an All Might hoodie, and takes to the streets helping people with simple tasks, where he's dubbed the "Nice Guy". He runs into Pop in an alley, where they once again are confronted by Soga and his crew. They proceed to assault Pop, and then Koichi when he attempts to intervene, but the two are saved by the arrival of a masked man known as "Knuckleduster", who easily takes out the thugs with his fists (while also inspecting their tongues). Knuckleduster believes that Koichi has the spirit to become a true hero and declares himself as Koichi's "Master". Koichi tries to refuse, believing the man to be crazy, especially realizing he doesn't have a Hero License, but Knuckleduster follows Koichi to his apartment anyway. Knuckleduster reveals he is investigating the drug "Trigger", which when injected causes a user's Quirk to exponentially grow in power, while losing some mental control. Due to the rate the drug is being spread and its effects, he believes the Heroes and Police aren't reliable to resolve it, so they must step in. At the same time, a "Scarred Man" approaches Soga and his crew, giving them Trigger, which they use to empower themselves. Later, Koichi, as well as Pop, join Knuckleduster, who is forcefully trying to find Trigger users by inspecting civilians' tongues. He is about to attack a salaryman with dolls in his suitcase, when he is stopped by Pro Hero Eraser Head.
2	2	"Takeoff"; Transliteration: "Teikuofu" (Japanese: 離陸(テイクオフ))	Sayaka Morikawa	Kenichi Suzuki & Naoto Uchida	April 14, 2025
Knuckleduster fights Eraser Head; the latter attempts to use his "Erasure" Quirk on him, but when its ineffective, he discovers Knuckleduster is Quirkless, so lets him go. At the same time, Pop realizes the salaryman was spotted at the previous Instant Villain sightings, so she and Koichi give chase. Soga and his crew appear looking for revenge, but Koichi and Pop escape, and they are restrained by Eraser Head. The salaryman injects Trigger hidden in his dolls into himself, transforming into a multi-armed giant, and playing with Pop like a doll. When Pop starts to fall after Knuckleduster attacks the giant, Koichi, thinking about his desire to be a hero, rushes up a building and into the air, allowing Pop to Leap off him, while he just barely survives the landing. The salaryman is promptly incapacitated by Eraser Head and arrested. Eraser Head thanks Knuckleduster for their help, but warns of the potential trouble their vigilantism could cause. On another day, Koichi, now dubbing himself "The Crawler", and Knuckleduster try to halt a confrontation between duelling middle schoolers to mixed results, until Pop resolves things. The former two proceed to take down an Instant Villain with a Hardening Quirk. After the Villain is arrested by the Police, Detective Tsukauchi realizes he was taken down by Vigilantes, and declares they must be investigated.
3	3	"Bee"; Transliteration: "Hachi" (Japanese: 蜂)	Hitomi Ezoe	Hitomi Ezoe & Kenichi Suzuki	April 21, 2025
Koichi struggles dealing with both Knuckleduster and Pop☆Step making themselves at home in his tiny rooftop apartment. Later, they face off against an Eel Instant Villain who attacks Pop during one of her concerts. Detective Tsukauchi discusses with Detective Tanuma about the recent Instant Villain sightings in Naruhata, noting how the recipients have been given the Trigger for free by unknown individuals, speculating they are sending some kind of message. Afterwards, Pop learns that her middle school fans, Jube and Ichimoku, befriended the Eel Instant Villain, Teruo, in hopes he can inform her any information where he received the Trigger. On the way to see them, Pop is greeted by an eye-patch wearing high school girl, Kuin Hachisuka, who is secretly a part-time Villain. Using her Quirk, "Queen Bee", which allows her to command a hivemind of bees containing Ideo Trigger, she unleashes them upon the city, creating a hoard of Instant Villains. The Pro Heroes quickly arrive to quell the danger, however in the chaos, Kuin lures away Teruo. Knuckleduster angrily destroys one of the bees, but is unable to find the culprit.
4	4	"Top Runner"; Transliteration: "Toppu Ran'nā" (Japanese: トップランナー)	Tsumiki Wada	Tsumiki Wada	April 28, 2025
Koichi tries to question Knuckleduster about his connection to the "Bee User" during their training session, but he remains unresponsive. Kuin later talks to her Boss, who informs her to be more peculiar about their Trigger subjects. She finds a junkie and gives him a dose of Trigger, sending him on a rampage through the streets. Despite being completely out-classed, Knuckleduster is able to just barely dodge the Instant Villain's attacks and finally defeat him, regaining his enthusiasm in his drive to defeat strong opponents. Kuin worries about the Vigilantes' constant interference, but the Boss considers it fine, since it allows them to receive data without Pro Hero and Police involvement. Later, Ingenium of Team Idaten chases after a Bat Villain, but he escapes. While practicing his Slide and Glide one morning, Koichi meets Ingenium, who provides him helpful advice to improve his mobility. Impressed by his abilities, Ingenium offers him a job working at his Agency once he graduates. That night, Team Idaten confronts the Bat Villain once again, however he is able to give them all the slip throughout Naruhata, until Koichi and Knuckleduster easily subdue him. Ingenium later thanks Koichi for the assist, yet retracts his invitation due to his vigilantism, disappointing Koichi, though still encourages him to continue his current position, feeling it fits him more.
5	5	"Judgment"; Transliteration: "Danzai" (Japanese: 断罪)	Shinnosuke Itō	Shinnosuke Itō	May 5, 2025
Koichi laments becoming ostracized by his classmates due to a misunderstanding regarding his living space. Pop later visits the Penthouse where she finds Koichi sewing, and then showing off, his prized All Might hoodie collection. When he mentions one of them missing, he reveals that several years ago, on the day of his high school entrance exam for the hero course, he stopped to save a young boy who fell in the nearby river, giving them his hoodie before running off. Despite missing the exam as a result, Koichi is content and hopes his action inspired the boy to become a hero themselves, a line of thinking that infuriates Pop, causing her to leave. In actuality, she was the person that Koichi saved that day, treasuring his hoodie and growing a deep infatuation to him. She attempts to return the hoodie to reveal the truth, but Koichi's bluntness and Knuckleduster's presence leaves her unable to and emotionally leaves yet again. On another night, Akira, the Hardening Instant Villain, is given another dose of Trigger by Kuin and sent on another rampage. Without Knuckleduster, Koichi is unable to handle him alone, when he is saved by a katana-wielding vigilante known as Stendhal. He excitedly voices his enthusiasm over Stendhal to Knuckleduster, when Pop informs Koichi about a "senior" of Ichimoku's that has information for them, only for it to turn out to be Soga; due to their less than warm reception, Soga leaves. Meanwhile, Akira is hunted down by Stendhal, who brutally kills him after voicing his beliefs on "conviction" and "judgment". He then prepares to target Soga and his friends next, which Kuin watches on intrigued.
6	6	"Crossing Lines"; Transliteration: "Issen" (Japanese: 一線)	Satoshi Takafuji	Michio Fukuda	May 12, 2025
Stendhal kills a group of yakuza, using his "Bloodcurdle" Quirk to paralyze them all after consuming some of their blood, which he received from Kuin; she intends to use him to tie up some of her loose ends. Soga and Moyuru go to see Rapt still recovering in the hospital, with the latter two stating their disinterest in taking more Trigger. Soga goes to see Kuin to conclude their business, only to find it is a set-up with Stendhal appearing to confront him. He intends to fight the vigilante on his own, but Kuin uses her bees to forcefully inject Trigger into his system, transforming his body; Soga also experiences painful visions of his past, viewing everyone looking down on or being condescending to him due to his Quirk. Koichi discovers Stendhal attempting to kill Soga, so rushes in to try and save him. Stendhal uses his Quirk to paralyze the two and nearly kills Soga, but they are saved by Knuckleduster. Despite Stendhal initially offering praise to the other vigilante, Knuckleduster criticizes Stendhal for lacking true resolve, and challenges him to not cross a line or else face his fists. Stendhal goes on the offensive, but is caught off guard when Knuckleduster steps over the line himself, dealing a heavy blow to his face and destroying his mask. Upon his defeat and hearing Knuckleduster's words of victory, Stendhal has a change in belief; thinking that "false heroes" are the ones that truly lack conviction, and escapes. Knuckleduster tends to Koichi's injuries, while Pop reluctantly tends to Soga, with the latter surprised at how nonchalant Koichi is to him despite everything he did to him. Later, after violently dismissing Kuin, Stendhal brutally mutilates his injured face, and declares that he will be the "stain" on society.
7	7	"Makoto/Truth"; Transliteration: "Makoto" (Japanese: 真)	Kōhei Hirota	Naoto Uchida	May 19, 2025
At college, Koichi is approached by upperclassman Makoto Tsukauchi, offering to assist him with his homework. She visits him at his Penthouse (where Pop is already there hiding), and lectures him on the history of Vigilantes, including their origin during the era of the birth of Quirks, and what led to their fall in being classified as Villains. She further reveals she is doing a personal investigation on the Naruhata Vigilantes and wants Koichi to help her. Later, Makoto talks with her brother, Detective Tsukauchi, who warns her about the potential danger of getting involved with "Villains". On another day, Koichi shows off his improved techniques with his Quirk, impressing Knuckleduster but annoying Pop, who is jealous of Makoto. Koichi meets up with Makoto as they take to the streets to gauge the civilians' opinions on the Vigilantes, in her effort to learn what makes them different from Heroes and Villains. They learn that "The Cruller" is considered by many to be creepy, Pop☆Step is praised but also particularly noted for her butt, and "Freaky Fist Grandpa" is viewed with wary; Koichi is dejected to hear about his reception. Suddenly a thief steals Makoto's laptop, so Koichi secretly suits up and goes after him, though Jube and Ichimoku are the ones who actually defeat him. Afterwards, Makoto uses her "Polygraph" Quirk on Koichi and asks him if he's "The Cruller"; he casually says no, which is viewed as a truth. As a result, Makoto feels stumped about her report, while elsewhere Koichi voices his complaint about nobody calling him "The Crawler".
8	8	"Major"; Transliteration: "Mejā" (Japanese: Major(メジャー))	Sayaka Morikawa	Taizo Yoshida	May 26, 2025
Koichi and Pop meet Captain Celebrity, the pompous and egotistical former Number 1 Hero of America, who has moved his hero career to Japan, as a result of the numerous lawsuits he has piled up due to his womanizing. Koichi in particular grows a distaste to the Hero, as a result of his showboating attitude, including glory-stealing after taking down a Kaiju Villain. After one instance where the two save civilians from a nearly destroyed building, Koichi discovers Makoto as one of Captain Celebrity's cheerleaders, growing more jealous; he and Pop later witness as she is taken out on a date by the American Hero. While together, Makoto reveals that she has been in contact with Captain Celebrity's estranged wife Pamela, to ensure that he actually straightens up his image. After C.C. takes pictures with Koichi to cover himself, Makoto is inspired to give the Captain a new makeover, changing up his cheerleading squad to be appealing to men and women, to his own discomfort. A few days later, Koichi learns from his dad that his mother is visiting very soon, which he panics as he knows if she finds anything troubling about his life, she will force him to move back home. He reveals to Pop that he lied and said he had a girlfriend, causing her to embarrassingly storm out. Koichi's mom, Shoko, soon arrives, inspecting his living space and demanding to see his girlfriend.
9	9	"Mom Descends"; Transliteration: "Mō Haha Shūrai!" (Japanese: 猛母襲来!)	Satoshi Takafuji	Satoshi Takafuji	June 2, 2025
Koichi calls upon Makoto to act as his girlfriend, but his mother immediately sees through the ruse. Pop then appears, in her civilian identity as Kazuho Haneyama, followed by Knuckleduster, in his own civilian identity as Takeshi Kuroiwa. He informs Shoko and Makoto how Koichi and Kazuho have been helping him as part of a "non-profit organization" doing volunteer work around Naruhata. After Makoto questions if Kuroiwa used to be a hero, Shoko voices her disdain towards Heroes, and her disappointment in Koichi for failing to make it to his entrance exam. Kazuho ends up speaking up as a result, but is unable to explain herself and runs off. On Makoto's pushing, Koichi attempts to compliment Kazuho's outfit, but after calling it "casual", she storms off annoyed. The next day, Makoto joins Koichi and Shoko checking out the tourist spots in Tokyo, with Koichi buying a new All Might hoodie in Asakusa. On their bus, Kuin injects Trigger into a nearby cat, causing it to fuse with the bus and rampage through the city. Ingenium soon arrives to help the passengers, with Pop and Knuckleduster luring the "Monster Cat" onto an empty highway. Team Idaten manages to evacuate most of the civilians, but the Monster Cat ends up fleeing with Makoto still on it. Ignoring his mother, Koichi suits up and speeds off to assist Ingenium, making it into the bus, with Makoto learning Koichi is The Crawler. Koichi and Makoto leap off the Monster Cat as it plummets off the destroyed highway, with Koichi managing to execute a burst into the air with his Quirk, saving the both of them. At the same time, Shoko talks to Kuroiwa about how even when he was a baby, she would slap down a floating Koichi, worried about his safety. Later as Shoko heads home, Makoto, with a blush on her face, tells her she won't rule out potentially dating Koichi.
10	10	"Event Announcement!"; Transliteration: "Ibento Kaisai!" (Japanese: イベント開催!)	Michiru Itabisashi	Kenichi Suzuki & Naoto Uchida	June 9, 2025
Knuckleduster visits his wife in the hospital, who is revealed to be in a catatonic state due to an attack by Kuin, and tells her he will reunite with "Tamao" soon. Soga investigates a nearby high school looking for information on Kuin, only to be attacked by a swarm of bees, until he is rescued by Moyuru and Rapt. He reports his findings to Knuckleduster, with Soga learning that he is using Koichi and Pop as "bait" to lure Kuin out. That night, Kuin returns "home", where she contemplates leaving the city, while Knuckleduster trains, preparing to confront her soon. On another day, Pop receives an invitation to perform at an event for the Marukane Department Store, but feels anxious about getting involved among other artists. To help her, Koichi requests Makoto's assistance (who had deduced Pop's identity after learning Koichi's), and becomes proactive in using her connections to Captain Celebrity to re-shape the event. Pop then learns she will be part of an ensemble performance with other local performers, which makes her feel more nervous. Later, Kuin sees the news of the performance, having conflicted feelings about it, as Knuckleduster finds her from the rooftops.
11	11	"The Day Of"; Transliteration: "Honban Tōjitsu" (Japanese: 本番当日)	Kentarō Kawajiri	Kentarō Kawajiri	June 16, 2025
Koichi and Pop go to the Marukane Department Store where they meet the other performers, idols Miu and Yu of the Feathers, the East Naruhata Dance Squad, and indie rock band the Mad Hatters. Makoto and everyone each do their part in practicing for the song and performance, with Captain Celebrity and his entourage advertising for the upcoming "Narufest". One week before the event, Miu sprains her ankle during training with the Dance Squad, so Pop suggests a way so the three of them can still perform together, endearing the Feathers to her after previously insulting her. That night, Kuin prepares to unleash Teruo, whose body's been now greatly modified, during the event. On the day of, the newly formed FeatherHATS get ready to perform, where they see special guest Heroes Midnight and Present Mic. Meanwhile, Eraser Head discovers Teruo causing a rampage nearby, learning his transformed body is natural after Erasure is ineffective. Thinking about Pop, Teruo uses his Electric Eel Quirk to release electromagnetic waves that shut down the power in the city, including at the venue. Kuin intends to disrupt the event with her bees, but is halted by her Boss to not drive too much attention to them. Just then, Knuckleduster confronts her, revealing Kuin is his daughter Tamao, being possessed by the Queen Bee. Armed with a stun gun, he charges after Kuin, who dodges each of his attacks. She sends out her Bomb Bees, but Knuckleduster is easily able to rebuff them, and soon gives chase across the city.
12	12	"Goodbye to Dad"; Transliteration: "Papa ni Sayonara" (Japanese: パパにさよなら)	Motonobu Hori	Motonobu Hori	June 23, 2025
As a result of the blackout, Makoto scrambles to resolve the issue, with the FeatherHATS worried they'll have to cancel their performance. Koichi appears with Pop☆Step's microphone and convinces her to use her guerrilla idol experience to work the crowd until the power returns. Pop nervously accepts, helping to keep the crowd calm while performing one of her songs. Meanwhile, Knuckleduster corners Kuin into an alley, forcing her to use Trigger on herself, which lessens the Queen Bee's control on Tamao, revealing that she ran away from home after an argument with her parents, where she was found by the Bee's previous host. However, Kuin catches the Vigilante off guard by using a sample of Teruo's Electric Eel Quirk to knock him out with a direct hit. At the same time, the power is returned to the Marukane building and the FeatherHATS put on their performance, to a great success. An annoyed Kuin is prepared to crash it once more, only for Knuckleduster to confront her once again, having used painkillers and his stun gun to resuscitate himself. As Kuin is about to use all her remaining energy to dispose of the body to take down the Vigilante, Knuckleduster uses his resolve to make things right with his daughter, and point blank shocks Kuin with his stun gun. With her on the verge of death, the hive mind escapes the body, while he extracts the Queen Bee from Tamao's eye, using a pheromone gas to attract and ultimately burn all the bees. He then uses a defibrillator connected to the stun gun to resuscitate Tamao back to life. Afterwards, Eraser Head talks to Tsukauchi about the transformed Teruo and having discovered a bee extracting something from his body, while the Scarred Man, using a speed Quirk, reclaims the last remaining bee from the hivemind, blending into the crowd.
13	13	"What a Man Takes with Him"; Transliteration: "Otoko ga Sono Te ni toru Mono wa" (Japanese: 男がその手に取るものは)	Tsuyoshi Tobita	Naoto Uchida	June 30, 2025
Koichi is chased by a Mantis Instant Villain, before being saved by Captain Celebrity. During the next Narufest performance, with the Captain busy filming a commercial with Ingenium, Pop forces Koichi as The Crawler on stage as the fill-in hero, to everyone's embarrassment. Meanwhile, Tsukauchi meets with Eraser Head and Midnight to discuss the new development in the Instant Villains case, as Teruo has led them to learn the mysterious organization has been further experimenting on people to turn them into "Next-Level Villains" to test their capabilities of using Trigger. With the scope and expense this organization is throwing at the operation, they speculate on what their ultimate goals could be. At the same time, the Scarred Man unleashes a newly-modified Bat Villain during the commercial shoot, who attacks Ingenium, and then targets Koichi for revenge, but is stopped by Captain Celebrity. On another day, Koichi notices Knuckleduster's left behind mask and knuckles, assuming he wants him to clean them. While being watched over by Soga at the hospital, Tamao regains consciousness, just as Knuckleduster returns. After he implies about her mother having passed away shortly before, he tells Tamao everything will be alright now because "he's here". As Koichi, Pop, and Makoto put up a corkboard in the Penthouse, a future Koichi reflects on how even though Knuckleduster was only with them for a few months, his presence was always felt, and soon there would be trouble he would have to face on his own.

===== Season 2 (2026) =====
No. overall	No. in season	Title	Directed by	Storyboarded by	Original release date
14	1	"Day-Tripping Down to Naniwa!"; Transliteration: "Naniwa no Machi ni Shutchō ya de!" (Japanese: 浪花の街に出張やで!)	Sayaka Morikawa	Michio Fukuda	January 5, 2026
Koichi and Pop head to Osaka for the latter to take part in an idol showcase. Koichi nearly misses the train on the way, but discovers a new application of his Slide and Glide Quirk, allowing him to stick to surfaces. When they arrive in Osaka, they meet the Pro Hero Fat Gum, who directs them to their venue, where they also meet the eccentric idol Monika Kaniyashiki, representing the crab-supplier Kanidoge. At the same time, Fat Gum is partnering with Detective Tsukauchi, who is investigating a drug dealing ring occurring at the event; Tsukauchi recognizes Pop and says to keep an eye on her. Meanwhile in Naruhata, Eraser Head confronts the Hotta Brothers, low-level drug dealers with Grasshopper Quirks, to question them about the rise in Trigger use in the area, and investigate the body modifications being done by the "Villain Factory". They agree to cooperate when they learn one of the former Instant Villains is their friend Kirihito, who was transformed into a giant mantis by the mysterious organization. Back in Osaka, when Monika suddenly disappears, Pop substitutes to represent Kanidoge by piloting a giant crab mech. In actuality, Monika is a police officer working undercover with Fat Gum to investigate drugs Kanidoge is supposedly shipping.
15	2	"Crabtastic Rampage!"; Transliteration: "Kanikani Dai Bōsō ya!" (Japanese: カニカニ大暴走や!)	Daisuke Inoue	Motonobu Hori	January 12, 2026
Monika and Fat Gum learn from Tsukauchi about the drugs secretly being carried in the crab shipments, and that the suppliers' goal isn't to profit off them. Monika inspects a package and discovers the drugs hidden in the ice packs. She confronts a part-time worker she doesn't recognize, who turns out to be the Villain Factory's "Scarred Man". Right as Fat Gum and the Police arrive, using his super-speed Quirk the Scarred Man steals a tablet, re-programming the crab mechs to attack Fat Gum and then explode, destroying some evidence. Tsukauchi and the Police give chase to the Scarred Man, successfully shooting him in the leg, so in retaliation he uses his Quirk to go so fast he perceives every thing in slow-motion, shooting all the officers with their own rubber bullets, before escaping. Meanwhile, the crab mech that Pop is riding also begins to run amok through the venue; Fat Gum and Monika rush after it, while Koichi, wearing a new All Might hoodie he found, clings onto the mech to try and save Pop. Monika uses her Snip Clip Quirk to halt the mech and free Pop, while Fat Gum uses his body to absorb most of the explosion. In the aftermath, Kanidoge's manager lets Koichi and Pop head back home, unaware they were supposed to stay behind to be questioned; Tsukauchi is handed Makoto's business card to get in contact with them. On the train, thinking about how heroic Koichi looked saving her, Pop tries to thank him, but he's already fast asleep.
16	3	"Public and Private"; Transliteration: "Kō to Watashi to" (Japanese: 公と私と)	Satoshi Takafuji	Satoshi Takafuji	January 19, 2026
All Might, in his civilian guise as Toshinori Yagi, speaks to Tsukauchi at Might Tower, shocked to see him injured from the Villain attack. He wants to help him, but Tsukauchi insists that as the "Symbol of Peace", All Might can't afford to play favourites with whom he saves. That night, Tsukauchi gets into an argument with Makoto over her protecting Koichi and Pop and her overall recklessness. He later interrogates Kirihito with Eraser Head and the Hotta Brothers, as the giant mantis man complains about how inaccessible everything is to him now. During his next meeting with All Might, Tsukauchi vents about his frustrations regarding Makoto, with All Might suggesting she is just leaning on her big brother. Meanwhile, while defending himself against a group of thugs, Koichi inadvertently discovers a way to repel objects from himself with his Quirk. Tsukauchi and Detective Tanuma investigate footage of the Scarred Man's attack on the Police, noting his acceleration Quirk, which they surmise as being similar to the Quirk of the High Speed Pro Hero: O'Clock. He questions Eraser Head about him, who states that he has been inactive for the past several years, and then suspects the Villain is either a child or a pupil of the Hero. Elsewhere, the Scarred Man trains with his Quirk, determining he can hit up to eight punches at once, and insists to his Boss he will only use firearms as a last resort, while looking at a poster of O'Clock he calls his "Master". At Koichi's Penthouse, he reveals to Pop the new discovery of his Quirk, the capability of shooting repulsion blasts from his palms. However, when he accidentally breaks his window, Pop berates him over its strength, reminding him about not turning out like Knuckleduster.
17	4	"A Rational Man"; Transliteration: "Gōriteki na Otoko" (Japanese: 合理的な男)	Ryō Tagawa	Michio Fukuda	January 26, 2026
Koichi tries practicing his repulsion powers, before being lambasted by Pop once again. Later, Koichi is chased by a rampaging Next-Level Villain known as Octoid, ending up in front of the Hotta Brothers' shop, where Eraser Head has been hanging out. The Pro Hero starts to attack the Villain, but his Erasure Quirk is ineffective and he is overwhelmed by it growing more arms. Before he is knocked out, Koichi jumps in and saves Eraser by shooting a repulsion blast at its head. Soon joined by the Hotta Brothers (under the rule of self-defence), the four lure Octoid to Kirihito's warehouse, so they can all fight it in the enclosed space. Koichi shoots more "Shooty-Go-Blams" at the Villain, but it ends up just irritating it more. Eraser and the Hottas temporarily contain the Villain, but it destroys the warehouse and escapes. In an alleyway, the Scarred Man defeats Octoid and takes a blood sample, but when the Villain lightly scars him, he furiously blows up, angrily stating he already has a cool scar he made himself to match his "Master". He nearly kills Octoid pushing his speed to its limit, but is forced to retreat when Koichi and the others arrive. On another day, Koichi greets Eraser while he's talking on the street with Tsukauchi, only to be bluntly ignored.
18	5	"The Man Returns"; Transliteration: "Kaettekita Otoko" (Japanese: 帰ってきた男)	Makiko Hayase	Makiko Hayase	February 2, 2026
Midnight is sent in to investigate a new batch of Trigger being spread through college mixers. She goes undercover and recruits Pop to assist, as Koichi just so happens to be attending a mixer with the Mad Hatters. During the event, one of the girls, Rin, gets drunk and nearly vomits but is helped by Koichi, causing her to get flustered and Pop to get jealous. The other girl, Hina, gets even more jealous and in retaliation spikes the drinks with Trigger, which causes everyone's Quirks to go haywire, so Midnight uses her Quirk to stop it by putting everyone to sleep. Later, Tsukauchi and Eraser Head discuss their discoveries, determining that these Trigger incidents are so that the Villain Factory can find suitable candidates with appealing Quirks to kidnap and turn into Next-Level Villains. Meanwhile in Hong Kong, China, a man goes to an apothecary looking for information, easily fighting off thugs who try to attack him. They realize that he is the Pro Hero "Hyper Quadfist", otherwise known as "O'Clock", who had lost his Quirk sometime in the past. The man confirms it is him, revealing he is Knuckleduster. Back in Japan, Soga and his crew are watching over a still recovering Tamao. Knuckleduster returns and apologizes to her that he has some things he has to finish first. He meets up with Tanuma to hand him the information, when Tanuma reveals to him about the Scarred Man who possesses O'Clock's Quirk. Knuckleduster informs him the only way to stop him is to kill him, and since the Police won't be able to handle it, he will. Later, Knuckleduster watches Koichi and Pop dealing with a Villain on the street with a smile, with Koichi just barely missing him.
19	6	"Rain and Clouds"; Transliteration: "Ame to Kumo" (Japanese: 雨と雲)	Yuka Shibata & Kanchi Miyata	Yuka Shibata & Kenichi Suzuki	February 9, 2026
Eraser Head talks to Midnight about her recent work as a teacher at U.A., learning Present Mic is about to become one too. She states her desire for Eraser to join them, but he bluntly refuses, believing he doesn't have the drive to properly teach kids. He then quickly disposes of a Villain chasing Koichi, who is protecting an abandoned kitten. While the two are waiting in the rain together, discussing what to do with the cat, Eraser Head reminisces on when he was a second-year student in U.A., when Shota Aizawa left his umbrella behind to protect an abandoned kitten, feeling depressed over not having what it takes to be a hero. His far more energetic friends, Hizashi Yamada and Oboro Shirakumo, try to cheer him up, with the latter having saved the cat himself. Despite being the troublemakers of their class, both Yamada and Shirakumo manage to receive positive analyses from their teachers, however Aizawa struggles with finding a goal in what kind of Hero he wants to be, as well as trying to make use of his Erasure Quirk. One day while eating lunch on the roof, they meet third year student Nemuri Kayama, who ends up adopting the cat, now named Sushi. While Yamada finds a Work-Study to take part in, Kayama offers Aizawa and Shirakumo to join her in the Agency of Pro Hero His Purple Highness.
20	7	"Glass Sky"; Transliteration: "Garasu no Sora" (Japanese: ガラスの空)	Sayaka Morikawa & Kenichi Suzuki	Kentarō Kawajiri & Kenichi Suzuki	February 16, 2026
While at the hero agency Team Purple Revolution with Kayama and Shirakumo, Aizawa is criticized by His Purple Highness for lacking any flair to stand out. Shirakumo gives Aizawa his goggles to help him better use his Erasure, which he uses effectively to take down a Smoke Villain he had previously failed to apprehend. Aizawa and Shirakumo proceed to form a tight hero duo as Eraser Head and Loud Cloud, showing off their skills in a training exercise to take down Yamada and Sensoji. Later, Shirakumo proposes eventually starting an independent agency with Aizawa and Yamada. Aizawa is unsure about needing to always rely on others, but seeing his two friends playing around with Kayama causes him to secretly smile. One week later, on a stormy night, a giant Villain rampages through the streets, with His Purple Highness lying unconscious.
21	8	"A Sky with No Rain Left"; Transliteration: "Ameagari no Sora ni" (Japanese: 雨上がりの空に)	Yuki Satō & Kenichi Suzuki	Yuki Satō, Itsuki Tsuchigami & Kenichi Suzuki	February 23, 2026
During patrol, Shirakumo and Aizawa foughts the destruction in the city caused by Garvey, a giant toad-like monster whose his Quirk "Stock" allows him to absorb and release the Quirks of others. He attacks Aizawa, Shirakumo, and His Purple Highness using the powers of Yamada and the Buster Union Pro Hero team; Purple Highness is knocked out and Shirakumo is crushed by debris while saving elementary school children. Aizawa attempts to fight the Villain alone, using Erasure to stall the stocked Quirks and defeats the monster by throwing his lumps into the mouth that ends up exploding and leaving him unconscious until he is arrested. Hearing Shirakumo's cheers of encouragement on his gourd, Aizawa pushes through and manages to beat Garvey by getting him to swallow his Quirk stockpile. As reinforcements arrive, Aizawa learns that the gourd was broken and he hallucinated Shirakumo's voice, while Shirakumo himself is revealed to have died, mortifying Aizawa and Yamada. By his third-year graduation, despite the teachers' reservations, Aizawa decides to become an independent Pro Hero, having spent the past year training, and resolving to fight Villains all on his own. Back in the present, Koichi and Eraser Head go to the Hottas' shop, where they learn that, alongside Kirihito and a reformed Octoid, they plan to open up a cafe soon; Octoid adopts the stray kitten. Seeing the group happily discuss making a cat cafe reminds Eraser of suggesting something similar with his friends back at school. Reflecting to himself how the sky is clear now, he walks off, telling the group he'll come visit the cat again.
22	9	"Farewell Party!"; Transliteration: "Iza o Wakare-kai!" (Japanese: いざ お別れ会!)	Tomoki Nakagami	Michio Fukuda	March 2, 2026
The Narufest gang celebrate with a Christmas party, where Captain Celebrity learns he will be able to return to America early next year with his lawsuits dealt with; he also learns his wife will be having their child soon, further inspiring him to improve. Koichi learns the secret behind Captain Celebrity's Flight Quirk, which allows him to create a near-impenetrable aerodynamic barrier which he can share with others. That night, a monster known as a "Bomber", controlled by The Scarred Man, attacks three of the girls, and Captain Celebrity manages to save them with his barrier just as the Villain detonates it. The Scarred Man uses this to deduce the secret behind the Quirk, realizing he is not invincible and plans to attack him with an army of Bombers. The incident ends up greatly improving the Captain's popularity, leading Makoto to start planning his big farewell party at the illustrious Tokyo Sky Egg, with the Narufest gang performing, and inviting many of the biggest Pro Heroes to join. Meanwhile, Tsukuachi resumes work on the Villain Factory case, thanks to Koichi and Pop "anonymously" providing information about their Vigilante activities to Eraser Head and Midnight. Tsukauchi informs All Might about this, who worries for him, while later Makoto tries to press her brother for All Might's contact.
23	10	"Zero Hour"; Transliteration: "Zero Awā" (Japanese: ゼロ・アワー)	Kanchi Miyata & Makiko Hayase	Jong Heo	March 9, 2026
Tsukauchi informs Eraser Head that using the Vigilantes' information they have uncovered that many of the drug dealers and Instant Villains are connected to the Onomura Pharma Corp., and that it may be a front used by the Villain Factory. To investigate further, they have recruited Fat Gum and Monika, with Eraser forced to assist the latter in putting on various disguises to intermingle with the employees. The day of Captain Celebrity's farewell party at the Tokyo Sky Egg finally arrives, as many of the Top Pro Heroes all perform on stage for the massive crowd. At the same time, the Police raid the Onomura Pharma branch in Kanto, believed to be where the Trigger drugs and Next-Level Villains are created. They uncover the lab where the Bombers are produced, with the Scarred Man unleashing them before they can be caught, as they head towards the Sky Egg. Captain Celebrity excitedly shows off a photo of himself, his wife Pamela, and their newborn baby, only for things to get incredibly awkward when he calls Pamela on stage, who's embarrassed by the act. When Koichi goes to check on the Captain, the Bombers attack, knocking Koichi outside. The Bombers start blowing up the Sky Egg's pillars, forcing Captain Celebrity to hold onto the dome to keep it from falling. With him exposed, the Scarred Man sends a Bomber with Regeneration to pummel the Hero with explosive punches.
24	11	"Balloon Soul"; Transliteration: "Fūsen no Kokoro" (Japanese: フーセンの心)	Shōji Ikeno	Shōji Ikeno	March 16, 2026
One of the Bombers releases an EMP blast on the Sky Egg, shutting down the power inside. The Heroes, led by Best Jeanist, take charge in helping keep the civilians safe while investigating what is going on outside. Captain Celebrity meanwhile continues to be blasted point blank by the regenerating Bomber's exploding punches, slowly starting to lose consciousness. Koichi, adorned in a Sky Egg-themed All Might hoodie, steps up and uses his "Shooty-Go-Blam" to protect the Captain by blasting the Bomber before it can attack, with the Hero reluctantly agreeing to Koichi's proposal of stalling for time until the other Heroes can arrive for aid. Captain Celebrity then begins to reflect back on his youth, when he was an extremely popular jock back in college, catching the eye of a sour-looking woman named Pamela who didn't pay attention to him, and later mockingly refers to him as a "balloon". When he takes her on a calm "balloon flight" in response, he falls head over heels for and begins to pursue her, with them eventually getting married. However after that he would run into trouble with both his relationship and scandals with his heroic duties, wondering where it all went wrong. Soon, Koichi and the Captain receive assistance from Eraser Head, making his way there on a chopper, and the Heroes in the Sky Egg, subduing the Bombers while Best Jeanist uses carbon fibres to keep the Sky Egg back in place. Finally exhausted, Captain Celebrity begins to plummet, hoping to himself he finally did good as a hero, only for Koichi to instinctively rush after him, forcing the two to fall together. The other Heroes go to rescue them, but The Scarred Man furiously activates the Bomber to explode, destroying the Sky Egg's support column.
25	12	"This is a Hero!"; Transliteration: "Kore ga Hīrō!!" (Japanese: これがヒーロー!!)	Michio Fukuda & Sayaka Morikawa	Michio Fukuda	March 23, 2026
Tsukauchi calls All Might about the Sky Egg collapsing, pleading to him to save his sister, as the Number One Hero almost immediately arrives, singlehandedly saving the building, along with Koichi and Captain Celebrity. While the Heroes and civilians are recovering, Tsukauchi apologizes for losing his composure, but a disguised All Might says those calls are what gives strength to his power, almost telling him about the secret behind his Quirk. Meanwhile, the Scarred Man is furious at the display, so uses the remaining Bomber cells to fuse together into 200 mini-Bombers, believing the Heroes won't be able to stop all of them. However, All Might powers up once again and instantly takes them all out in one punch. The Villain laughs hysterically at the feat, and his Boss, referring to him as "Number 6", reveals that All Might is the genuine superhuman, a "deus ex machina" that is the culmination of their plans. At the same time, Knuckleduster attempts to assassinate Number 6 from a nearby roof, but only grazes his shoulder, as the two meet face-to-face. Number 6 confirms he is in possession of O'Clock's Quirk, known as "Overclock", and that he has no name or true identity. He states that while All Might could only be the world's saviour or destroyer with his power, O'Clock's speed grants him the freedom to do whatever he desires, so asks the man for his blessing to become his successor. Knuckleduster rebuffs him, saying that he not only already has a successor in Koichi, but believing O'Clock wasn't a real hero, and anyone else with his power would just be a crazy Villain. Number 6 attempts to attack the powerless Knuckleduster, but using his knowledge of how Overclock functions, the Vigilante tricks him into listening to a sped-up recording, catching him off guard while detonating the building, and proceeding to shoot all his limbs and beat him down to not use his Quirk. He attempts to restrain him, but Number 6 reveals he possesses Bomber cells in his body, regenerating and exploding himself.
26	13	"Graduation and Career Path"; Transliteration: "Sotsugyō to Shinro" (Japanese: 卒業と進路)	Kenichi Suzuki	Michio Fukuda	March 30, 2026
The respectively bloodied and beaten Knuckleduster and Number 6 charge at each other once more, as the building they're inside completely crumbles. Later, the Narufest crew hang out in the hospital as Captain Celebrity recovers. The Captain apologizes to Koichi for taking all of his credit in helping resolve the Sky Egg incident, but Koichi is satisfied not getting any attention; Makoto reveals Tsukauchi is aware of Koichi's involvement, but is willing to let him off the hook for his vigilantism as thanks for his actions. Pamela soon arrives to reunite with Captain Celebrity, thanking Koichi for saving him. Two weeks later as the Captain and his family head back to America, Makoto reveals that she will be joining him to go to college in the States and continue being his manager. That night, Pop laments Koichi not receiving the praise he deserves, but embarrassingly refuses to do it herself. Meanwhile, Tsukauchi and Tanuma investigate the collapsed building, discovering the blood samples of O'Clock – real name Iwao Oguro – and an unknown entity; with Tanuma worrying what kind of monster they are dealing with. Two years later, Koichi has become more well-known and respected in Naruhata as The Crawler, as he saves some schoolgirls from two animal-like thugs, who are then forcefully recruited to join the recently opened Hopper's Cafe by its heteromorph staff. Now in his senior year of college, doing job interviews, and having worn out most of his All Might hoodies (which he resolves to never throw away), Koichi voices his consideration of retiring his vigilantism; the thought terrifying Pop, only to be soothed when he invites her out on a patrol where he resolves to stay a hero in his heart. Meanwhile, the Villain Factory's boss, All For One, observes Doctor Garaki's work in modifying Number 6.

== Reception ==
The first volume of the manga sold 18,909 copies on the weekly Oricon's manga chart; volume 2 sold 21,123 copies in September 2017; volume 3 sold 11,468 copies in February 2018; volume 4 sold 15,725 copies in April; volume 5 sold 16,251 copies in September; and volume 6 sold 16,118 copies in February 2019. In North America, the volumes of the manga were ranked on NPD BookScan's monthly top 20 adult graphic novels list since July 2018, while it was among the top 20 manga graphic novels list in September and October 2018.

My Hero Academia: Vigilantes was chosen as one of the "Best Manga" in 2018, while it was listed in the "Underrated but Awesome Manga" category in 2019 at the San Diego Comic-Con Best and Worst Manga panel. Barnes & Noble named the series on their list of "Our Favorite Manga of 2018", stating that it may be more entertaining than the original. The website also wrote: "While some of the characters of the original series drop in from time to time, Vigilantes is really a whole new story set in the world of the original, exploiting a different set of possibilities, and completely enjoyable on its own."
