= Mars Daybreak =

Japanese media franchise

- Cover of the first DVD volume

絢爛舞踏祭 (Kenran Butōsai)
- Genre: Adventure, Comedy, Mecha, Romance
- Created by: Sony Interactive Entertainment
- Anime television series
- Directed by: Kunihiro Mori
- Produced by: Masahiko Minami; Taihei Yamanishi; Takeshi Sasamura
- Written by: Miya Asakawa
- Music by: Kaoru Wada
- Studio: Bones
- Licensed by: NA: Bandai Entertainment
- Original network: TV Tokyo
- English network: ImaginAsian
- Original run: April 1, 2004 – September 23, 2004
- Episodes: 26
- Video game
- Developer: Alfa System; Prokion (Note: Additional work by Sony Computer Entertainment Japan.)
- Publisher: Sony Computer Entertainment
- Platform: PlayStation 2
- Released: July 7, 2005

Mars Daybreak (Japanese: 絢爛舞踏祭 ザ･マーズ･デイブレイク, Hepburn: Kenran Butōsai Za Māzu Deibureiku) is a Japanese science-fiction anime television series created by Sony Computer Entertainment. It aired on TV Tokyo from April 1 to September 23, 2004. It is currently licensed by Bandai Entertainment. Kenran Butōsai (絢爛舞踏祭, Kenran Butōsai; lit. 'gorgeous dance ritual') is a simulation game based on the concept developed by Alfa System and published by Sony Computer Entertainment for the PlayStation 2 video game console.

== Plot ==
Life on Mars is hard for those who live here. As the economy worsens, work becomes scarce and food becomes expensive and highly prized. Gram and his friends try to do the best they can but, he finds himself on the run with the most notorious pirates on Mars. The only problem is he soon starts to enjoy the adventure.

== Characters ==
=== Main characters ===
Gram River
Voiced by: Tomokazu Seki (Japanese); Johnny Yong Bosch (English)
The anime's main protagonist. He grew up as an orphan on Mars, with a mysterious necklace as the only clue to his past.
Vestemona "Vess" Lauren
Voiced by: Houko Kuwashima (Japanese); Melissa Fahn (English)
Gram's childhood friend and eventual sweetheart, who was a fellow orphan on the Adena city ship.

=== Crew of the Ship of Aurora ===
Elizabeth Liati
Voiced by: Miyuki Ichijo (Japanese); Barbara Goodson (English)
The Captain of Aurora who oversees what's going on in the ship, and will not tolerate any betrayal.
Kato Takigawa Jr.
Voiced by: Daisuke Sakaguchi (Japanese); Yuri Lowenthal (English)
Nicknamed Junior or Shou, dreams of becoming an RB diver, despite what anyone says otherwise.
MAKI
Voiced by: Gara Takashima (Japanese); Peggy O'Neal (English)
The AI of the Aurora who has a personality of her own.
Ester Ein Astrada
Voiced by: Fumiko Orikasa (Japanese); Kate Higgins (English)
Like Elizabeth, she also pilots the Aurora. She also keeps track on the surrounding waters, whether it be the Earth Forces launching their attack or any other creatures. She is 141 years old. Ester often refers to herself as a Nautical Witch, who fought in a war a long time ago. It is possible she is a gynoid or some other kind of artificial being. In the Japanese anime, her voice actress is Fumiko Orikasa, and her voice actress is Kate Higgins in the English adaptation.
Yagami Arian
Voiced by: Jin Yamanoi (Japanese); Steven Blum (English)
A soldier under Nelle Poe who fought for Mars independence during the Pan-Galactic War, where he was apparently part of a vast battle in which he was either the only survivor, or one of very few. He is nicked-named "The Reaper" because of the many RBs he has destroyed, and the coldly efficient way he operates; early in the series, he informs Elizabeth that "I just don't know how to hold back."
Aki Polandwood
Voiced by: Takumi Yamazaki (Japanese); Erik Davies (English)
As with Nelly, he also works as a mechanic in the Aurora, which they get the RBs ready for take-off.
Megumi Higashibara
Voiced by: Yui Horie (Japanese); Stephanie Sheh (English)
A girl who has the ability to read the minds, thoughts and emotions of various life forms.
Neli
Voiced by: Maki Tamura (Japanese); Wendee Lee (English)
As with Aki, she also takes care of the RB repairs and also prepares the RBs for launch.
Enora Taft
Voiced by: Akino Murata (Japanese); Colleen Villard (English)
The granddaughter of Earth's president.
Sala
Voiced by: Akiko Yajima (Japanese); Megan Hollingshead (English)
The nurse of the Aurora's clinic who tends to the wounded crew members.
Chrysalis Milch
Voiced by: Kiyoyuki Yanada (Japanese); Jamieson Price (English)
The person in charge of loading the torpedoes and firing them at incoming enemies.
Clara
Voiced by: Mako Hyōdō (Japanese); Mela Lee (English)
A cat that can talk. She is technically the "professor" of the Ship of Aurora, and is the most intelligent and logical of the crew.
Poipoider
Voiced by: Hiroshi Yanaka (Japanese); Michael McConnohie (English)
A talking cetacean (resembles a small beluga whale) in a large water-filled suit, which enables him to walk on robotic legs and use robotic arms.

=== Other characters ===
Kubernes
Voiced by: Keiji Fujiwara (Japanese); Lex Lang (English)
An old acquaintance of Elizabeth.
Niall Poe
Voiced by: Shinpachi Tsuji (Japanese); Michael McConnohie (English)
A self-proclaimed revolutionary who owns the Aurora.
Bon
Voiced by: Rikako Aikawa (Japanese); Brianne Siddall (English)
A young orphan who takes care of his little sister, Shie.
Shie
Voiced by: Yōko Teppōzuka (Japanese); Sandy Fox (English)
Bon's little sister.
Selena Knightley
Voiced by: Akiko Hiramatsu (Japanese); Bridget Hoffman (English)
A woman from the wealthy Rodeo Sector, looking for her lover who apparently was a pirate.

=== Mars Aboriginies ===
The first colonists of Mars and only ones to experience Mars as a world not covered in water, the Aborigines were meant to be the first phase colonizers of Mars until the flood that would cover Mars in water. After centuries had passed, Earth, believing that Mars was unpopulated, soon allowed another group of colonists to populate Mars. Instead, they found many descendants of the original colonists surviving there, having adapted to the planet. The second migration occurred around 200 years before the time of the series.

== Technology ==
Ship of Aurora
One of the most notorious pirate ships on Mars, where the mere mention of the name and/or just the sight of the Auroras' crewman puts fear in pirates and Earth Force service men alike. Other pirates would run away from encounters with the Ship of Aurora. In the series, this is first shown during episode seven when the Black Whirlpool proclaimed that service shuttle form the Ship of Aurora is in the Whirlpool's personal berth. The captain soon reverses his proclamation once he notice Milch, torpedo room officer in also being a formidable crewman of the Aurora, leaves the berth to the shuttle. Just like any pirate ship, the Ship of Aurora is crewed by many different species from a cat to a Naval Witch. The ship's AI, MAKI, is also considered a crewman with its own personality. The submarine is armed with torpedoes, cannons, missiles, grappling hooks and several Round Bucklers. Its two most infamous attacks is the Daybreak, (which basically a ramming technique), and the Elizabeth Cannon, (which is just the Captain screaming at the top of her lungs), causing all those in the immediate vicinity to flee in absolute terror.
City-Ships
City-Ships are literally floating cities that drift in Mars huge ocean. The city ships have been around since Mars was colonized for a second time and some are over a hundred years old.
Round Bucklers
These are mecha designed solely for an underwater environment. RBs can come in two different build designs, but all RBs are unique since they are completely based on the equipment used in the construction process. The size of an RB varies form as roughly larger than basic pressure suit to a small iceberg. Throughout the series other mecha units are shown and used but are given no name and used in a variety of Jobs.
Cordless
A "Cordless" Round Buckler means that the pilot himself is contained within the unit itself, this most commonly used by pirates since the Earth Forces view Cordless designs as archaic. Throughout the series there are only five Cordless Round Bucklers. Some details of how an RB is built is shown when the captain of the Ship of Aurora orders a crew member's RB sim pod to be scrapped and then be used in the construction of another Round Buckler.
Corded
Round Bucklers controlled externally (known as "corded") come in pairs, usually commanded by most simply a pressure suit to a Seahorse, a control unit used by the Earth forces. Cables are attached to the RBs which are usually smaller, faster, capable of extreme maneuvers since there is no actual pilot within the RB itself compared to cordless; yet through the series whenever cordless and cord RBs are in combat a cordless RB is victorious, this may merely be because of the relative skill of most cordless pilots. Though technically attached to control unit most cables have a beacon at the end of the cable that allows the RBs to move beyond the cables maximum length, usually several nautical miles further before the pilot is unable to control the RB.

== Anime ==
The series was produced by Bones, directed by Kunihiro Mori with Miya Asakawa writing the script. Kaoru Wada composed the series' music and character designs by Hiroshi Osaka. It aired from April 1, to September 23, 2004, on TV Tokyo. The opening theme is "Take Back" by G B Shelter while the ending theme is "Aoi Tabibito (Blue Travelers)" by Takatsugu Tsumabuki.

No.	Title	Original release date
1	"Raid! The Ship of Aurora"; Transliteration: "shuugeki! yoake no fune" (Japanese: 襲撃！夜明けの船)	April 1, 2004
2	"Furious Attack! Round Buckler"; Transliteration: "moukou! RAUNDOBAKKURAA" (Japanese: 猛攻！ラウンドバックラー」)	April 8, 2004
3	"Jr. Dream Deployment!"; Transliteration: "SHOU akogare no shutsugeki!" (Japanese: ショウ 憧れの出撃！)	April 15, 2004
4	"Contact! Gram, Vess and the Submarine"; Transliteration: "sesshoku! GURAMU to BESU to sensui kan" (Japanese: 接触！グラムとベスと潜水艦)	April 22, 2004
5	"Anna's Struggle! The Fleet of our Dreams"; Transliteration: "ANNA funtou! yume no waga kantai" (Japanese: アンナ奮闘！夢の我が艦隊)	April 29, 2004
6	"Ah! Revolution of Glory and Passion!?"; Transliteration: "aa! eikou to jounetsu no kakumei yo!?" (Japanese: 嗚呼！栄光と情熱の革命よ！？)	May 6, 2004
7	"Friend or Foe!? The Mercenary Pirate"; Transliteration: "teki ka mikata ka!? youhei kaizoku" (Japanese: 敵か味方か！？傭兵海賊)	May 13, 2004
8	"Gorgeous! Extravagant Ball"; Transliteration: "kenran! gouka butou kai" (Japanese: 絢爛！豪華舞踏会)	May 20, 2004
9	"Thump! Swimsuit-riddled Bathhouse"; Transliteration: "DOKI!! mizugi darake no dai sentou" (Japanese: ドキッ！水着だらけの大銭湯)	May 27, 2004
10	"Sightsee! Romance of the First Martian Immigrant"; Transliteration: "kankou! kasei senjuu imin no ROMAN" (Japanese: 観光！火星先住移民のロマン)	June 3, 2004
11	"Breakthrough! Federation Trap"; Transliteration: "toppa seyo! chikyuu gun houi mou" (Japanese: 突破せよ！地球軍包囲網)	June 10, 2004
12	"Bizarre! The Ghost Ship Drift Zone"; Transliteration: "kaiki! yuurei sen hyouryuu chitai" (Japanese: 怪奇！幽霊船漂流地帯)	June 17, 2004
13	"Daring, Fearless! Bride on the Bottom of the Sea"; Transliteration: "daitan futeki! kaitei no hana yome" (Japanese: 大胆不敵！海底の花よめ)	June 24, 2004
14	"Big Jailbreak! Beyond Love and Passion"; Transliteration: "dai datsugoku! ai to jounetsu no hate ni" (Japanese: 大脱獄！愛と情熱の果てに)	July 1, 2004
15	"The Enemy Under Eyes! Dive Deep, Quietly"; Transliteration: "ganka no teki! fukaku shizuka ni senkou seyo" (Japanese: 眼下の敵！ 深く静かに潜航せよ)	July 8, 2004
16	"Enter! Hakubutsu Ship, Eichi's Castle!"; Transliteration: "sennyuu! hakubutsu toshi sen, eichi no shiro" (Japanese: 潜入！ 博物都市船、叡智の城)	July 15, 2004
17	"Rebellion! The Universe's Greatest Pilot!"; Transliteration: "hanran! uchuu saikyou no kaizoku" (Japanese: 叛乱！ 宇宙最強の海賊)	July 22, 2004
18	"Marriage proposal to the Captain!? The Man who is called "Doctor""; Transliteration: "senchou ni kyuukon!? DOKUTAA to yobareta otoko" (Japanese: 船長に求婚！？ ドクターと呼ばれた男)	July 29, 2004
19	"Fly, Kibougou! Over that Gate!"; Transliteration: "tobe kibou gou! ano mon wo koete" (Japanese: 翔べ希望号！ あの門を越えて)	August 5, 2004
20	"Duel! Gram and Vess"; Transliteration: "hatashiai! GURAMU to BESU" (Japanese: 果たし合い！グラムとベス)	August 12, 2004
21	"Good-bye My Friend! A Man's Dream Lasts Forever"; Transliteration: "saraba tomo yo! otoko no yume wa eien ni" (Japanese: さらば友よ！男の夢は永遠に)	August 19, 2004
22	"Discovery! Sanctuary of the Olympus treasure legend" Transliteration: "hakken! ORINPOSU hihou densetsu no seichi" (Japanese: 発見！オリンポス秘宝伝説の聖地)	August 26, 2004
23	"God's Stone! Free For All Battle"; Transliteration: "kami no ishi! zenjin mitou no soudatsu sen" (Japanese: 神の石！ 前人未踏の争奪戦)	September 2, 2004
24	"Earth Forces Attack! The Ship of Aurora's Break-through Tactic"; Transliteration: "chikyuu gun kyoushuu! yoake no fune totsunyuu sakusen" (Japanese: 地球軍強襲！ 夜明けの船突入作戦)	September 9, 2004
25	"Run, Gram! Rescueing the Captured Comrades"; Transliteration: "kakero GURAMU! toraware no nakama wo sukue!!" (Japanese: 駆けろグラム！ 囚われの仲間を救え！！)	September 16, 2004
26	"The Dawn of Mars! Mars Daybreak"; Transliteration: "kasei no yoake! MAAZU.DEIBUREIKU" (Japanese: 火星の夜明け! マーズ・デイブレイク)	September 23, 2004
