= Escaflowne (film) =

2000 Japanese animated film

- Theatrical release poster
- Directed by: Kazuki Akane
- Screenplay by: Ryota Yamaguchi; Kazuki Akane
- Based on: The Vision of Escaflowne by Hajime Yatate and Shōji Kawamori
- Produced by: Masahiko Minami; Minoru Takanashi; Masuo Ueda; Toyoyuki Yokohama
- Starring: Maaya Sakamoto; Tomokazu Seki; Jōji Nakata; Mayumi Iizuka; Minami Takayama; Kōji Tsujitani; Shin-ichiro Miki; Ikue Ootani; Kappei Yamaguchi
- Cinematography: Kazunori Okeda
- Music by: Yoko Kanno; Hajime Mizoguchi
- Production companies: Bones (animation); Sunrise (production)
- Distributed by: Omega Project
- Release date: June 24, 2000
- Running time: 98 minutes
- Country: Japan
- Language: Japanese
- Box office: $94,060 (limited US theatrical release)

Escaflowne (Japanese: エスカフローネ, Hepburn: Esukafurōne) is a 2000 Japanese animated adventure dark fantasy film produced by Sunrise and animated by studio Bones. Directed by Kazuki Akane, the film is a re-telling of the 26-episode anime television series The Vision of Escaflowne. The film was licensed for Region 1 release by Bandai Entertainment, which gave the film a theatrical release in January 2002.

A soundtrack and two drama CDs have also been released in Japan by Victor Entertainment in relation to the series. There was also a novelization written by Ryota Yamaguchi published in 2000 by Kadaokawa Sneaker Bunko.

== Plot ==
Hitomi Kanzaki is in crisis. Her life has lost its meaning, and she is plagued by unusual dreams. She is depressed and wants nothing more than to disappear. After falling out with her only friend, she is mysteriously summoned to another world, Gaea, where she finds herself inside Escaflowne, a doomsday weapon destined to come to life at the appearance of a prophesied "wing goddess". The world of Gaea is facing its own crisis: relentless conquest by the Black Dragon Clan, the rebels against which become convinced that Hitomi is the prophesied goddess who will revive Escaflowne. Never certain of her identity in Gaea, Hitomi finds her destiny as she becomes closer to the rebel leader, Lord Van, and helps to bring about the fall of his vengeful brother Lord Folken, the master of the Black Dragon Clan.

== Voice cast ==
Character name	Japanese	English (Bandai Entertainment/The Ocean Group) (2002)	English (Funimation) (2016)
Hitomi Kanzaki	Maaya Sakamoto	Kelly Sheridan	Caitlin Glass
Van	Tomokazu Seki	Kirby Morrow	Aaron Dismuke
Folken	Jōji Nakata	Paul Dobson	Vic Mignogna
Yukari/Sora	Mayumi Iizuka	Willow Johnson (Yukari); Sylvia Zaradic (Sora)	Jad Saxton (Yukari); Tia Ballard (Sora)
Dilandau	Minami Takayama	Andrew Francis	Joel McDonald
Jajewca	Kōji Tsujitani	Scott McNeil	Chuck Huber
Allen	Shin-ichiro Miki	Brian Drummond	Sonny Strait
Merle	Ikue Ōtani	Jocelyn Loewen	Alexis Tipton
Shesta	Kappei Yamaguchi	Trevor Devall	Chris Cason
Dryden	Jūrōta Kosugi	Michael Dobson	Eric Vale
Nukushi	Takashi Matsuyama	Brian Dobson	Cris George
Millerna	Aki Takeda	Venus Terzo	Colleen Clinkenbeard
Gaddes	Tōru Ōkawa	Ward Perry	Ian Sinclair

== Production ==
Escaflowne varies greatly from the original The Vision of Escaflowne series. With character re-designs by Nobuteru Yūki, the film focuses on the relationship between Van and Hitomi and their personal issues. The characters themselves are also given different personalities, with the film Hitomi changing from a cheerful girl in love to a depressed, suicidal schoolgirl who is suffering from self-induced feelings of loneliness and alienation. Van is also depicted as being more lonely and emotionally reserved, as well as being far more aggressive and willing to slay any perceived enemies than his more pacifistic series counterpart. Although the Vision of Escaflowne series had been produced by Sunrise, the animation for the film was handled primarily by studio Bones, a company founded by a number of ex-Sunrise staff. It was the first Bones feature film production. Studio co-founder Hiroshi Ōsaka and character designer Nobuteru Yūki split the animation director duties, with Ōsaka heading up production at Bones. Some of the film's action sequences were assigned to the studio's animators as talent showcases, notably including Yutaka Nakamura (who animated nearly a minute and a half of the opening sword fight without assistance). The soundtrack was, as with the Vision of Escaflowne series, composed mostly by Yoko Kanno in collaboration with Hajime Mizoguchi.

While the plot of the film has some similar elements to the original television series, the characters differ in varying degrees from the television counterparts, with many completely redesigned and bearing little resemblance to the originals. The world of Gaea has a more Asian design than the heavily European influenced television series.

== Release ==
Escaflowne was released in Japan on June 24, 2000; while the first European presentation was on January 19, 2001, during the Future Film Festival in Bologna. The North American theatrical premiere was on January 25, 2002, in select cities, including Los Angeles, New York, San Francisco, Dallas, Chicago, and Vancouver. The North American television premiere was on September 10, 2005, on the programming block Adult Swim, after airing on [adult swim] on demand.

== Home media ==
Bandai Visual released the film to DVD in a two-disc limited edition set on April 25, 2001. Packed in a limited edition art box, the release included a 36-page booklet on history of the film, as well as on-disc interviews with staff and cast and the theatrical trailers and television commercials. The film was released to Blu-ray disc on January 28, 2008. Formerly licensed by Bandai Entertainment, Escaflowne was first released to Region 1 DVD on July 23, 2002, in "Standard" and "Ultimate" editions. The Ultimate Edition included premium packaging, the CD soundtrack, an exclusive Maaya Sakamoto music video, interviews from the theatrical premiere events, and interviews with the staff and cast. On September 13, 2005, the film was re-released as part of Bandai's "Anime Legends" line, including many of the extras from the Ultimate Edition, including the CD soundtrack and interviews. The film was given another re-release on February 6, 2007, under Bandai's "Anime Movie Classics" label. Unlike the "Anime Legends" release, this version uses the same cover art and CD as the original standard DVD release. Bandai Entertainment also included the Ultimate Edition release of the movie in its 2004 "Perfect Collection" DVD set of the original Vision of Escaflowne anime series. Bandai released a Blu-ray version of the film on October 20, 2009. At Otakon 2013, Funimation Entertainment had announced that they have rescued both The Vision of Escaflowne and the movie. Both the movie and The Vision of Escaflowne were re-released in 2016 with a new English dub.

=== Soundtrack ===
The Escaflowne OST was released on July 5, 2000, and contains twenty-six tracks, including the movie's full opening and ending themes. Yoko Kanno and Hajime Mizoguchi composed and produced the movie's musical themes and backgrounds. Vocal performers include Maaya Sakamoto, Shanti Snyder, Midori, Children of Adom — Vocals and the Warsaw Chorus.

In North America, the soundtrack was released with the Ultimate Edition Region 1 DVD release on July 23, 2002, and with the "Anime Legends" re-release on September 13, 2005. The CD has not, however, been given an individual release.

=== Drama CDs ===
Victor Entertainment released two drama CDs: Escaflowne Prologue 1: Earth and Escaflowne Prologue 2: Gaea were both released on October 21, 2000, and originally broadcast as part of the Bunka Hoso radio show. Both drama CDs are out-of-print in Japan.
