= Masahiko Minami =

Japanese film and television producer

- 南 雅彦
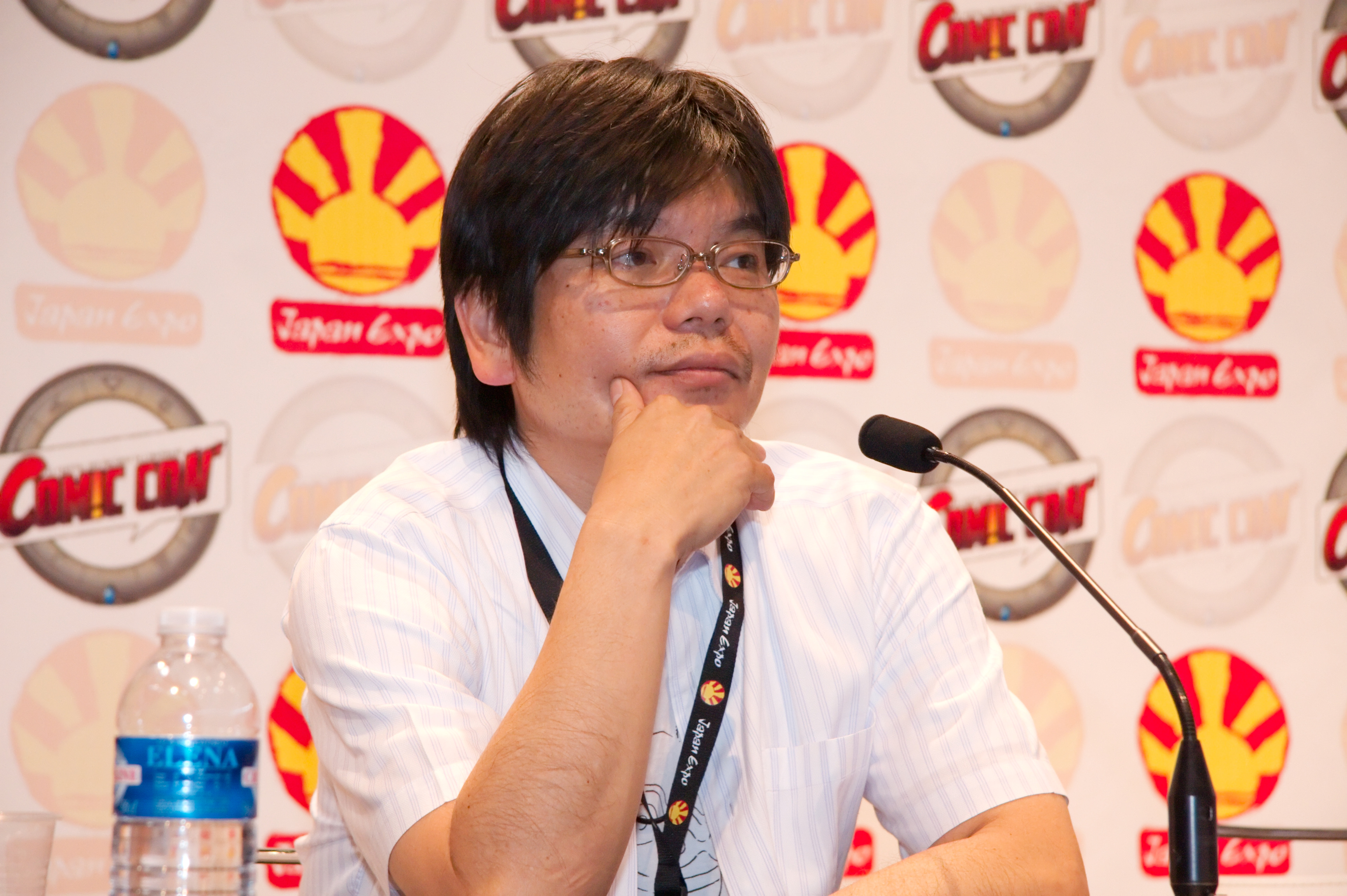
- Masahiko Minami at Japan Expo 2009
- Born: August 24, 1961 (age 65); Mie prefecture, Japan
- Occupations: Anime executive producer; film producer; television producer; studio executive
- Years active: 1984-present
- Employer(s): Sunrise (1984-1998); Bones (1998-present)
- Known for: Founder of Bones
- Notable work: Cowboy Bebop; Eureka Seven

Masahiko Minami (南 雅彦, Minami Masahiko; born August 24, 1961) is a Japanese anime producer and president of Bones.

== Early life ==
Minami was born in Mie Prefecture, Japan.

== Career ==
A graduate of the Osaka University of Arts's department of arts, Minami joined the noted anime studio Sunrise in 1984, where he began his career as one of its producers. Later, in 1998, he co-founded Bones together with animators Hiroshi Osaka and Toshihiro Kawamoto.

He was classmates in university with Gainax co-founder Hiroyuki Yamaga and manga artist Kazuhiko Shimamoto. He is portrayed by actor Kaname Endo in the 2014 television drama Aoi Honō based on Shimamoto's autobiographical manga.

== Works ==
=== Sunrise ===
- Ginga Hyōryū Vifam - Assistant
- Choriki Robo Galatt - Production assistant
- Mobile Suit Zeta Gundam - Assistant
- Blue Comet SPT Layzner - Production assistant
- Bats & Terry - Production assistant
- City Hunter 1&2 - Production assistant/ Production chief
- City Hunter 357 Magnum - Production chief
- Obatarian - Production chief
- Mobile Suit Gundam 0083: Stardust Memory - Assistant producer
- Mobile Suit SD Gundam series - Producer
- Shippu Iron Leaguer - Producer
- Mobile Fighter G Gundam - Producer
- Vision of Escaflowne - Producer
- Escaflowne - Producer
- Cowboy Bebop - Producer
- Cowboy Bebop: The Movie - Producer

=== Bones ===
- Hiwou War Chronicles - Producer
- Angelic Layer - Producer
- RahXephon - Producer
- RahXephon: Pluralitas Concentio - Producer
- Welcome to Pia Carrot!! The Movie ~Sayaka no Koi Monogatari~ - Producer
- Wolf's Rain - Producer
- Scrapped Princess - Producer
- Fullmetal Alchemist - Producer
- Fullmetal Alchemist the Movie: Conqueror of Shamballa - Producer
- Fullmetal Alchemist and the Broken Angel - Animation producer
- Fullmetal Alchemist 2: Curse of the Crimson Elixir - Animation producer
- Fullmetal Alchemist 3: The Girl who Succeeds God - Animation producer
- Kurau Phantom Memory - Planning/ producer
- The Mars Daybreak - Producer
- Eureka Seven - Planning
- Eureka Seven: AO - Planning/ chief producer
- Eureka Seven: Good Night, Sleep Tight, Young Lovers - Production/ producer
- Eureka Seven: Hi-Evolution 1 - Production/ planning
- Anemone: Eureka Seven Hi-Evolution - Production/ planning
- Eureka: Eureka Seven Hi-Evolution - Production/ planning
- Ouran High School Host Club - Producer
- Jyu-Oh-Sei - Production/ producer
- Ayakashi Ayashi - Planning/ producer
- Darker than Black - Planning
- Darker than Black: Gemini of the Meteor - Planning
- Skull Man - Production
- Sword of the Stranger - Producer
- Soul Eater - Planning
- Nijū Mensō no Musume - Production
- Xam'd: Lost Memories - Planning
- Fullmetal Alchemist: Brotherhood - Planning
- Tokyo Magnitude 8.0 - Production
- Heroman - Planning
- Star Driver - Planning
- Star Driver The Movie - Planning
- Gosick - Planning
- Towa no Quon - Production
- Fullmetal Alchemist: The Sacred Star of Milos - Production/ planning/ producer
- No. 6 - Production
- Un-Go - Production
- Blast of Tempest - Planning/ chief producer
- Space Dandy - Planning/ producer
- Noragami - Planning/ chief producer
- Noragami Aragoto - Planning/ chief producer
- Tenkai Knights - Animation production supervisor
- Captain Earth - Planning/ chief producer
- Soul Eater Not! - Planning
- Chaika: The Coffin Princess - Production
- Blood Blockade Battlefront - Planning
- Blood Blockade Battlefront & Beyond - Production
- Show by Rock!! - Planning
- Show by Rock!!# - Planning
- Snow White with the Red Hair - Planning
- Concrete Revolutio - Planning
- My Hero Academia - Production
- My Hero Academia: Two Heroes - Co-production
- My Hero Academia: Heroes Rising - Co-production
- My Hero Academia: World Heroes' Mission - Co-production
- Blood Blockade Battlefront - Production
- Bungo Stray Dogs - Executive producer
- Mob Psycho 100 Season 1 - Planning
- Mob Psycho 100 Season 2 - Planning/ producer
- Mob Psycho 100 Season 3 - Planning/ producer
- Dragon Pilot: Hisone and Masotan - Planning
- Metallic Rouge - Producer
- Gachiakuta - Planning
