= Ghost Slayers Ayashi =

Japanese anime television series

- Key visual for the series

天保異聞 妖奇士 (Tenpō Ibun Ayakashi Ayashi)
- Genre: Historical fantasy
- Created by: Shō Aikawa; Bones
- Manga
- Written by: Yaeko Ninagawa
- Published by: Square Enix
- English publisher: NA: Bandai Entertainment (former)
- Magazine: Young Gangan
- Original run: September 15, 2006 – July 20, 2007
- Volumes: 2
- Anime television series
- Directed by: Hiroshi Nishikiori
- Produced by: Hiroo Maruyama; Masahiko Minami; Ryō Ōyama
- Written by: Shō Aikawa
- Music by: Kow Otani
- Studio: Bones
- Licensed by: NA: Bandai Entertainment (former)
- Original network: JNN (MBS, TBS)
- English network: SEA: Animax Asia
- Original run: October 7, 2006 – March 31, 2007
- Episodes: 25 + 5 OVAs
- icon

Ghost Slayers Ayashi (Japanese: 天保異聞 妖奇士, Hepburn: Tenpō Ibun Ayakashi Ayashi) is a Japanese anime television series. The series was created and written by Shō Aikawa, produced by Bones, directed by Hiroshi Nishikiori, and featured character designs by Toshihiro Kawamoto. It was broadcast for twenty-five episodes on MBS and TBS from October 2006 to March 2007. A two-volume manga adaptation by Yaeko Ninagawa was published in Square Enix's seinen manga magazine Young Gangan from September 2006 to July 2007. Both the anime series and the manga adaptation were licensed for English release in North America by Bandai Entertainment.

== Plot ==
In 1843, the fourteenth year of the Tenpō Era, a decade before the arrival of Commodore Matthew Perry and the Black Ships, the city of Edo faces an unprecedented threat from monstrous entities known as Youi (妖夷, Yōi), which emerge from the underworld. To combat these supernatural incursions, a specialized group within the Bansha Aratamesho, called the Ayashi (奇士), is tasked with confronting and repelling the Youi. Despite the growing frequency of attacks, the Ayashi persist in their mission, standing as the last line of defense against the encroaching darkness.

== Characters ==
=== Ayashi of the Bansha Aratamesho ===
Ryūdō Yukiatsu (竜導 往壓) / "Yuki" (ゆき)
Voiced by: Keiji Fujiwara (Japanese); Steve Blum (English)
A 39-year-old drifter who wields the power of Ayagami—the ability to extract a creature's true name and forge it into a weapon. The son of a hatamoto samurai, he vanished at 15 and reappeared a year later, though only moments passed for him. Unable to reintegrate into society, he wanders, haunted by the Other World. Years prior, he killed his friend Kumoshichi in self-defense, repressing the memory and unconsciously summoning a Youi in his likeness. Once reckless, he grew reserved after the tragedy. Marked by tattoos from vagrant camps, he sympathizes with outcasts, forever an outsider himself.
Ogasawara Hōzaburō (小笠原 放三郎)
Voiced by: Tokuyoshi Kawashima (Japanese); Kyle Hebert (English)
A 20-year-old scholar specializing in Rangaku (蘭学; lit. 'Western studies'), he leads the Ayashi of the Bansha Aratamesho. His duties as their leader frequently conflict with the government's political machinations, forcing him to navigate between loyalty to his people and the demands of authority.
Edo Genbatsu (江戸 元閥)
Voiced by: Shin-ichiro Miki (Japanese); Crispin Freeman (English)
A Shinto priest who cross-dresses as part of a longstanding family tradition, Genbatsu's feminine appearance and mannerisms often lead others to mistake him for a woman, despite his deep voice. He frequents the geisha district, where he has many female friends. Skilled in firearms—from pistols to bazookas—he operates more as a munitions specialist than a priest. He frequently partners with Abi, sharing a close friendship that includes drinking and socializing together.
Saizō (宰蔵)
Voiced by: Michi Niino (Japanese); Stephanie Sheh (English)
Saizo is a young girl raised in the male-dominated theater world, where women are forbidden from performing, leading her to adopt a boyish appearance. Her homosexual father, who died in a fire after she accidentally discovered him with his lover, instilled masculine traits in her. Haunted by her name's connection to "sin", she struggles with deep-seated guilt. Trained from childhood in a sacred dance said to summon Amaterasu from her cave, she also wields a folding fan that extends into a paper rope capable of restraining Youi. Though her exact age is unclear, contextual clues suggest she is around fourteen.
Abi (アビ)
Voiced by: Rikiya Koyama (Japanese); Jamieson Price (English)
A warrior of the Emishi people, Abi wields a spear that magically splits into five when thrown. His towering physique, dark complexion, and rugged attire set him apart. He shares a close bond with Genbatsu, likely due to their similar personalities. A skilled fighter, he maintains a straightforward and practical approach to combat.

=== South Edo Magistrate ===
Torii Yōzō (鳥居 耀蔵)
Voiced by: Norio Wakamoto (Japanese); Steve Kramer (English)
The South Edo Magistrate and lord of Kai domain, he staunchly supports Chief Elder Mizuno Tadakuni's Tenpō Reforms. As a high-ranking official, he plays a key role in implementing these political and economic changes during the Tenpō era.
Honjō Tatsusuke (本庄 辰輔)
Voiced by: Seiji Sasaki (Japanese); Richard Epcar (English)
A retainer of Torii Yōzō, he operates as a spy, conducting covert missions and intelligence operations on his lord's behalf.
Hanai Toraichi (花井 虎一)
Voiced by: Tomohiro Nishimura (Japanese); David Lodge (English)
A Rangaku scholar.
Matsue Sote (松江 ソテ)
Voiced by: Shoko Tsuda (Japanese); Cindy Robinson (English)
A relative of Honjō Tatsusuke, she journeyed to the Other World and returned with the ability to breed yōkai-like creatures. These beings serve as the Magistrate's specialized task force against other yōkai.

=== Shogunate government ===
Atobe Yoshisuke (跡部 良弼)
Voiced by: Takaya Hashi (Japanese); Michael McConnohie (English)
The biological brother of Mizuno Tadakuni, he serves as Ogasawara's superior while his sibling opposes Torii Yōzō politically.
Abe Masahiro (阿部 正弘)
Voiced by: Kenji Hamada (Japanese); Christopher Corey Smith (English)
Appointed Elder at twenty-five, he represented the shogunate in negotiations with Matthew Perry during Japan's opening to foreign powers.
Tōyama Kagemoto (遠山 景元)
Recently transferred from North Edo Magistrate to Chief Censor after dismissal, he serves as a political opponent to Torii Yōzō in government affairs.

=== Other characters ===
Atl (アトル, Atoru)
Voiced by: Fumiko Orikasa (Japanese); Julie Ann Taylor (English)
Atl, an Aztec girl from Mexico, works in a Japanese circus with her massive horse, Yukiwa (雪輪). Orphaned in Texas, she prayed to Quetzalcoatl, summoning a Youi that takes the form of a horse capable of transforming into a dragon. Inspired by stories from stranded samurai, she traveled to Japan seeking refuge. Facing prejudice as a foreigner, she disguised her bronze skin with makeup to blend in. After her true identity was exposed, Genbatsu helped place her under the care of geishas in the red-light district. Uniquely, she can perceive Kumoshichi's true nature as a Youi, a trait shared only with Yukiatsu.
Kumoshichi (雲七)
Voiced by: Yuji Ueda (Japanese); Doug Stone (English)
Kumoshichi is Yuki's unseen companion, perceptible only to him. The original Kumoshichi—Shikiji—was a man Yuki knew fifteen years prior. Seeking to end Yuki's self-destructive behavior, Shikiji provoked a lethal confrontation, forcing Yuki to kill him in self-defense. Traumatized, Yuki repressed the memory and unconsciously manifested a Youi in Shikiji's likeness. This spectral Kumoshichi remained by Yuki's side, offering guidance. When Yuki later discovered the truth, he was devastated. During Quetzl's rampage, Kumoshichi merged with the dragon-horse Youi, stabilizing it. Thereafter, he existed only as part of Quetzl—retaining his voice and consciousness within the creature.
Ōta (央太)
Voiced by: Chinami Nishimura (Japanese); Cindy Robinson (English)
Ōta, a boy nearly sacrificed to a Youi by his father during a famine, escaped with his mother Tae. While the village blamed poor harvests on mountain gods, his father may have intended to cannibalize him, as he had done to Ōta's sister. When a Youi consumed his father, Ōta briefly glimpsed the Other World. Though Tae fled with him, Ōta longed to return, disillusioned by their harsh life. After encountering Yukiatsu—who understood his torment—he chose to remain in the real world with his mother. His story reflects the desperation of famine and the persistence of trauma.
Tae (たえ)
Voiced by: Aya Hisakawa (Japanese); Bridget Hoffman (English)
Tae, Ōta's mother, flees with her son to evade the pursuing mountain god. Initially drawn to Yukiatsu and briefly considering marriage, she ultimately chooses stability, relocating to another city with Ōta. Her actions reflect both protective maternal instincts and a pragmatic desire for safety after their traumatic ordeal.
Tamahei (玉兵)
Voiced by: Izumi Hisashi (Japanese); Michael Sorich (English)
An inept okappiki (auxiliary policeman), he relentlessly pursues Yuki despite his comical incompetence, serving as a recurring foil in their encounters.
The Western Ones (西のもの, Nishi no Mono)
A mysterious group of masked bandits led by Akamatsu—a man with a distinctive X-shaped facial scar—they wield Ayagami powers and create Youi. Their motives remain unknown, though their abilities mirror Ryūdo's.
Kawanabe Kyōsai (河鍋 暁斎) / Kai Shūzaburō (甲斐 周三郎)
Voiced by: Minami Takayama (Japanese); Mona Marshall (English)
A gifted young painter who briefly visited the Other World after nearly drowning while retrieving a severed head from a river. Exceptionally confident for his age, he frequents brothels—allegedly for artistic observation—and shows interest in Atl. Despite his youth, he assists the Ayashi by gathering intelligence and protecting Atl when needed.

== Broadcast and release ==
Ghost Slayers Ayashi was produced by Bones and created and written by Shō Aikawa. It was directed by Hiroshi Nishikiori, featuring character designs by Toshihiro Kawamoto, and music composed by Kow Otani. The series was broadcast for twenty-five episodes on MBS and TBS from October 7, 2006, to March 31, 2007. The first opening song is "Ryūsei Miracle" (流星ミラクル), performed by Ikimono-gakari, while the first ending song is "Winding Road", performed by Porno Graffitti. The second opening song is "Lone Star", performed by Captain Straydum, and the second ending song is "Ai Toiu Kotoba" (愛という言葉), performed by Saki. Aniplex collected its episodes in eight DVDs released from February 28 to October 24, 2007; a five-episode original video animation (OVA), tiled Ghost Slayers Ayashi: Inferno (天保異聞 妖奇士 奇士神曲, Tenpō Ibun Ayakashi Ayashi Shinkyoku), was released with the sixth (episode I), seventh (episodes II and III), and eighth volumes (episodes IV and V).

In North America, the series was licensed for English release by Bandai Entertainment. The series was released on three DVDs from February 3 to September 15, 2009. A complete DVD set was released on July 6, 2010. In Southeast Asia, the series was broadcast on Animax Asia.

=== Episodes ===
No.	Title	Original release date
1	"The Youi Cometh"; Transliteration: "Yōi, Kitaru" (Japanese: 妖夷、来たる)	October 7, 2006
Torii Yōzō, the South Edo Magistrate, promises to recognize the legitimacy of the Bansha Aratamesho if Ogasawara and the others can recruit a man called Ryūdō Yukiatsu into the organization.
2	"After the Fall of the Mountain God"; Transliteration: "Yama no Kami Ochite" (Japanese: 山の神堕ちて)	October 14, 2006
Yukiatsu helps the other Ayashi to protect Ōta from the Youi.
3	"The Undercurrents of Beautiful Edo"; Transliteration: "Hana Edo Anryū" (Japanese: 華江戸暗流)	October 21, 2006
The samurai residential quarters of Edo are under attack by the second Youi. Meanwhile, Yuki must choose between a life with Ōta and Tae-san or a life as an ayashi.
4	"Life-Size Dolls"; Transliteration: "Iki Ningyo" (Japanese: 生き人形)	October 28, 2006
The Office of Barbarian Knowledge Enforcement is investigating a series of missing persons around the circus area in Yotsuya. The South Edo Magistrate are also pursuing the same case.
5	"The Tale of a Murderer"; Transliteration: "Hitogoroshi no Hanashi" (Japanese: ひとごろしのはなし)	November 4, 2006
Tamahei, the Okappiki, suspects that Yukiatsu might have murdered someone in Edo 15 years ago.
6	"Racing Dragon Aura"; Transliteration: "Ryūki Hashiru" (Japanese: 竜気奔る)	November 11, 2006
The serpent Youi runs wild in Edo. Torii plans to use Atl as human sacrifice to appease the Youi.
7	"The Dragon is Within the Cloud"; Transliteration: "Ryū wa Kumo ni" (Japanese: 竜は雲に)	November 18, 2006
Yukiatsu tries to draw out the Ayagami from the serpent Youi, but finds he is unable to do it. The only thing to do is to try to take the Ayagami from Shichi in order to subdue the Youi. To change the serpent Youi into a good spirit, Kumoshichi fuses himself with it.
8	"Fox Theatre"; Transliteration: "Kitsune Shibai" (Japanese: 狐芝居)	November 25, 2006
The Office of Barbarian Knowledge Enforcement is given jurisdiction to investigate the case of missing people around the Kabuki playhouses. Saizō is adamant to investigate the case without Yukiatsu's help.
9	"Front and Back"; Transliteration: "Omote to Ura" (Japanese: 面と怨)	December 2, 2006
Saizō is possessed by the Mask Youi and her dance is drawing all Youi into Edo. Ogasawara orders his Ayashi to terminate Saizō.
10	"A Maiden's Dance Like Spring Flowers"; Transliteration: "Yayoi Hana Niō Musume no Kagura" (Japanese: 弥生花匂女神楽)	December 9, 2006
After Ryūdō confronts Saizō and saves her from the Mask Youi, Saizō manages to destroy the Youi herself.
11	"Nikkō Fey Road"; Transliteration: "Nikkō Kaidō" (Japanese: 日光怪道)	December 16, 2006
Ryūdō and Ogasawara travel along a highway outside Edo, slaying Youi to make a safe path for an important official to travel through the area.
12	"Hakuryu Howls to the Moon"; Transliteration: "Hakuryū, Tsuki ni Hoeru" (Japanese: 駁竜、月に吠える)	December 23, 2006
The Western Ones use the Killing Stone to summon a vast number of Youi in the Nikkō region. Meanwhile, Ogasawara is told he must kill his old friend Kanō to prove his innocence.
13	"Heaven, Hell and a Book of Rumors"; Transliteration: "Jigoku Gokuraku Fūbungaki" (Japanese: 地獄極楽風聞書)	December 30, 2006
Tamahei, the policeman, explains to Kai Shūzaburō, a young painter, about the Bansha Aratemesho. His story recaps all the previous episodes.
14	"Butterfly Dance"; Transliteration: "Kochō Umai" (Japanese: 胡蝶舞)	January 13, 2007
After a woman is murdered in the brothel district, Shūzaburō and Atl come under suspicion from a special branch of the police called the Arson/Thievery Investigations.
15	"Woman of Rashōmon Alley"; Transliteration: "Rashōmon Gashi no Onna" (Japanese: 羅生門河岸の女)	January 20, 2007
The Arson/Thievery Investigations continue to investigate the murders. Eventually the Office of Barbarian Knowledge Enforcement discover that the killer is a Youi which uses human bodies as a chrysalis.
16	"People of Craft"; Transliteration: "Ki no Tami" (Japanese: 機の民)	January 27, 2007
The government officials supporting the Office of Barbarian Knowledge Enforcement come under attack by an elusive gunman, and the ayashi investigate. Meanwhile, Abi meets a tribesman from his past.
17	"The Shrouded World"; Transliteration: "Kakuriyo" (Japanese: 幽世)	February 3, 2007
Saizō and Edo Gen are help captive by the mountain tribesmen, who reveal that their true target is Torii Yozo. Meanwhile, the other ayashi investigate the tribesmen and Abi searches for his sister.
18	"Wanderer's Paradise"; Transliteration: "Hyōhakusha no Rakuen" (Japanese: 漂泊者の楽園)	February 10, 2007
The attack on Torii fails. Abi continues to seek his sister, but eventually learns that she resides in the Other World and has become a demon.
19	"The Three Yukiatsus"; Transliteration: "Sannin Yukiatsu" (Japanese: 三人往壓)	February 17, 2007
Two people, a boy and an aging man, appear in Edo, both claiming to be called Ryūdo Yukiatsu. The ayashi investigate this and in doing so discover more about Ryūdo's past.
20	"Shinobazu Pond Lullaby"; Transliteration: "Shinobazunoike Komoriuta" (Japanese: 不忍池子守唄)	February 24, 2007
Yukiatsu must decide whether he wants to return to his family permanently. The Ryūdo family sword transforms into a giant Youi and Ryūdo fuses with Kumoshichi to defeat it.
21	"To Perish in the Starlit Night"; Transliteration: "Seiya ni Hatsu" (Japanese: 星夜に果つ)	March 3, 2007
The Western Ones create a new Youi which travels to Edo and attacks a series of young girls, transforming them into heartless killers. Atl and Saizō act as bait for the Youi but in the end it chases Edo Gen instead, and is later killed by Ryūdo.
22	"The Drunk Who Does Not Come Home"; Transliteration: "Kaette Konai Yopparai" (Japanese: 帰ってこないヨッパライ)	March 10, 2007
The ayashi hunt down a sake-based Youi which dwells in the water systems. Meanwhile, Atl meets a samurai who will soon be forced to commit seppuku so she tries to open a gate to the Other World which will lead him to safety.
23	"Inba Swamp Construction Along the Old Canal"; Transliteration: "Inbanuma Furuhori Sujigofushin" (Japanese: 印旛沼古堀筋御普請)	March 17, 2007
The Ayashi receive a plea for help at the Inba Marsh construction site, but Atobe orders Ogasawara to not take action because Torii is supervising the construction and his failure could provoke his downfall. However, Ogasawara does not stop the other Ayashi from going there instead.
24	"Fantasy of the Latter Southern Court"; Transliteration: "Gonanchō Gensō" (Japanese: 後南朝幻想)	March 24, 2007
Atl's dissatisfaction with the Human world reaches its peak, and she summons a massive Youi which falls under the Western Ones' control. To complicate matters, Yuki discovers that Genbatsu has joined the Western Ones.
25	"Interlude - People are Ayashi"; Transliteration: "Hito wa Ayashi" (Japanese: ヒトハアヤシ)	March 31, 2007
To complete their master plan, the Western Ones use Atl's power to summon another gigantic Youi deep into the Ayashi's lair, but Yuki and his companions bring forth the full power of their ayagami to stand against them.

=== OVAs ===
No.	Title	Original release date
Inferno–I	"The River of Wailing"; Transliteration: "Nageki no Kawa" (Japanese: 嘆きの河)	August 22, 2007
Finance Magistrate Atobe Yoshisuke dispatched Ogasawara Hozaburo, now a ronin and other Ayashi to investigate the case of missing Hatamoto samurai near Tsukudashima Island.
Inferno–II	"The City of Dis"; Transliteration: "Dīte no Ichi" (Japanese: ディーテの市)	September 26, 2007
Ogasawara Hozaburo is thrown into jail at Kodenma-cho Prison for murder. There he met his former tutor Takano Choei again. Saizo is determined to infiltrate the prison to free Ogasawara.
Inferno–III	"Mount Purgatory"; Transliteration: "Rengokuzan" (Japanese: 煉獄山)	September 26, 2007
Takano and Ogasawara escaped from prison after fire broke out at Kodenma-cho.
Inferno–IV	"Earthly Paradise"; Transliteration: "Chijō Rakuen" (Japanese: 地上楽園)	October 24, 2007
The Ayashi traveled to Ezo (Hokkaido).
Inferno–V	"Myth"; Transliteration: "Shinwa" (Japanese: 神話)	October 24, 2007

== Manga adaptation ==
A manga adaptation by Yaeko Ninagawa was serialized in Square Enix's seinen manga magazine Young Gangan from September 15, 2006, to July 20, 2007. Square Enix collected its chapters in two tankōbon volumes, released on February 24 and October 25, 2007.

In North America, the manga was licensed for English release by Bandai Entertainment. The volumes were released on September 16 and December 16, 2008.
