= Mobile Suit Gundam: Lost War Chronicles =

Video game

- Mobile Suit Gundam: Lost War Chonicles manga Tokyopop release, Volume 1

機動戦士ガンダム戦記 (Kidō Senshi Gundam Senki)
- Genre: Mecha, Drama, Action
- Manga
- Written by: Tomohiro Chiba, Bandai Games
- Published by: Kadokawa Shoten
- English publisher: NA: Tokyopop
- Magazine: Gundam Ace
- Original run: May 25, 2002 – January 26, 2004
- Volumes: 2
- Video game
- Developer: Bec
- Publisher: Bandai
- Music by: Takanori Arima; Koji Yamada
- Genre: Action
- Platform: PlayStation 2
- Released: August 1, 2002 (Original and Limited Versions); February 17, 2005 (Gundam The Best Version)

Mobile Suit Gundam: Lost War Chronicles (機動戦士ガンダム戦記, Kidō Senshi Gundam Senki) is a Sci-Fi Mech Shooter/Mech Simulator Game for the Sony PlayStation 2. This game allows the user to play as a regular soldier on either the EFSF or the Principality of Zeon, witnessing events from the One Year War on a grunt unit's point of view. The user is able to fight side by side with the Ace pilots as they make cameo appearances on certain missions. Getting a high rank on a certain key mission unlocks a mobile suit (usually the strongest one featured on that episode). Suits from Mobile Suit Gundam to Mobile Suit Gundam 0083: Stardust Memory appear in the game. Music from the game was composed by Takanori Arima and Koji Yamada.

A manga version has also been published by Kadokawa Shoten and in North America by Tokyopop.

== Characters ==
=== Earth Federation Forces ===
Lt. Matt Healy ( マット・ヒーリィ中尉) — An Earth Federation pilot, Matt leads the Experimental Unit featured in the game. In the game, the player assumes his role in the Federation Story. Portrayed as a kind-hearted leader, he is always looking out for his team. He values human lives very much, allies and enemies alike. Due to this, he often ignores strategic advice from the team's operator, Noel Anderson, and comes into conflict with her. Despite this, the whole team still has great faith in him since no team members have died while fighting under his command. Matt saw action in most of the important battles on Earth at Operation Odessa and Battle of Jaburo. He retired from the military after the war and lived as a civilian in Australia. Matt pilots a RGM-79[G] GM Ground Type mobile suit, but later switches to a RX-79[G] ground type Gundam. In the PSP game, Gundam Battle Royale, his stats as a pilot is considerly high, even outmatching more famous Federation aces such as Shiro Amada and Yu Kajima. He is featured in the PS2 game, G Generation Spirits as an obtainable character. He doesn't appear in the game, characters simply refer him as "Captain".

In the manga, his unit is known as the Special Forces, 3rd Platoon.

Corp. Noel Anderson (ノエル・アンダーソン) — The operator of the Experimental Unit and the leading female protagonist in the Federation story. She is an expert on mobile suit combat theory. She is quite the "by the book" kind of person, and this often brought her to question Matt's pacifist stance. Although she disagrees with Matt on battle strategies in many occasions, she still shows great admiration for her captain. After the war, she is promoted to Ensign and has the chance to meet with the famous operator of the Pegasus Class Warship Thoroughbred, Miu Takizawa. She is also the Federation operator for the player for the PSP game, Gundam Battle Royale and one of the operators in the sequels Gundam Battle Chronicles and Gundam Battle Universe. One of the cut-scenes in the game imply that she might have a crush on player character. She is featured in the PS2 game, G Generation Spirits as an obtainable character.

1st Lt. Rachel Milsteen (レーチェル・ミルスティーン) — A beautiful blonde woman who wears glasses. She is mission planner of the unit and also acts as an aide-de-camp for the Admiral Kowen. She is in charge of mission debriefing and evaluations in the game.

Master Sgt. Larry Radley (ラリー・ラドリー) — A member of the Experimental Unit and a Federation pilot. One of the wingmen in the Federation side. He usually took on the role of the sharpshooter. Unfortunately, he is killed in action during the Battle of Jaburo. (He survives in the game)

Sgt. Anish Roffman (アニッシュ・ロフマン) — A member of the Experimental Unit. Other wingman of the main character. Has a funny personality and acts some sort of a comic relief in the story. After the death of Larry however, he changes completely. He becomes angered by Matt's pacifist attitude and decide to kill all Zeon enemies.

Private 1st Class Annie Brevig (アニー・ブレビッグ) — An African-American woman. Member of the Experimental Unit and the engineer of the team. After the battle of Jaburo, She transferred to the Pegasus Class battleship Thoroughbred. (She stays with the unit in the game.) She also seems to have feelings for the main character, as seen in one of the cut-scenes.

Admiral John Kowen (ジョン・コーウェン) — Federation Commander in charge of the unit in the game. Later he is put charge of the Gundam Development Project in Gundam 0083.

=== Principality of Zeon ===
Lt. Ken Bederstadt — A Zeon pilot, Ken is the Captain leading the Zeon MS squad featured in the game and in the manga. He enters the One Year War as a foreign legion soldier who rose to the rank of Lieutenant, leaving behind his only daughter. It is unknown what happened to his wife. He earned the nicknamed "pitiless war god" after he is driven into a killing frenzy due to the death of Corporal Yuki during a Federation attack. He survived the war and served in the Zeon Republic Army after the war. In the manga, he first piloted a MS-06 Zaku and later a customized Gelgoog. In the game, the player assumes his role in the Zeon Story. He is featured in the PS2 game, G Generation Spirits as an obtainable character. Just like Healy, he doesn't appear in the game, other characters simply refer him as "Captain".

May Cowin — A 15 years old, cheerful child prodigy and an engineer who accompanies the Zeon MS Squad. Ken cares a lot about her as she reminds him of his daughter. She worked in Anaheim electronics after the war. She was sought after by both the Titans and Zeon Remanats and was saved by Matt Healy under the request of Lt. Ken Bederstadt. She is featured in the PS2 game, G Generation Spirits as an obtainable character.

Corp. Yuki Nakasato — The Zeon operator in the game and in the manga. She was fatally wounded trying to protect May during one of the team's retreat from the Federation and die soon after. She survives in the game and can later be seen in the other gundam games such as Climax U.C. (PS2), Encounters in Space (PS2). She is also appears in the Gundam Battle series as an operator, which can be considered that she actually survived the events in the manga. She is an obtainable character in the PS2 game, G Generation Spirits. She seems to have feelings for the main character as evident in one of the cut-scenes.

Captain Jane Conty - A beautiful but very serious officer who is in charge of the debriefings and evaluations. As the game progresses, she warms up to the main character.

Master Sergeant Garsky Zinobaev - One of the wingmen of the main character for the Zeon side. A very experienced but somewhat cynical pilot.

Sergeant Jake Gunns - Other wingman for the main character. He is not as experienced as the Zinobaev but eager to prove his worth. He is very loyal to his comrades.

Colonel Douglas Rodin - Commander of the Zeon forces in the game. Some sort of a father figure for most of the soldiers under his command, he is serious and loyal to the Zeon's ideals. But that doesn't prevent him from making jokes and hitting on women once in a while.

Zeon's Wave(a.k.a. Kerguelenko) - A nameless female Zeon operator who appears many One Year War Gundam games. Her real name in unknown but she has a long hair and wears a white ribbon. She appears in several games such as Journey to Jaburo(PS2), Climax UC(PS2), and Gundam Battle Universe (PSP).

Many other characters from One Year War, such as Char Aznable, Gihren Zabi, Garma Zabi, General Revil, Christina McKenzie, Amuro Ray and Shiro Amada also make cameo appearances in the game via cut-scenes.

== Reception ==
On release, Famitsu magazine scored the game a 31 out of 40.
