= List of Hanasakeru Seishōnen volumes =

The cover of the first volume of Hanasakeru Seishōnen as published by Hakusensha in January 1990 in Japan.

Hanasakeru Seishōnen is a Shōjo manga series written and illustrated by Natsumi Itsuki. The manga was serialized in Hakusensha's shōjo magazine (aimed at teenage girls), LaLa from February 24, 1987, to March 24, 1987, and again from August 24, 1989, to August 24, 1994.

== Original Volumes list ==
No.	Japanese release date	Japanese ISBN
01	January 1990	978-4-592-19801-7
02	May 1990	978-4-592-19802-4
03	September 1990	978-4-592-19803-1
04	March 1991	978-4-592-19804-8
05	August 1991	978-4-592-19805-5
06	January 1992	978-4-592-19806-2
07	February 1993	978-4-592-12127-5
08	May 1993	978-4-592-12128-2
09	April 1994	978-4-592-12129-9
10	April 1994	978-4-592-12130-5
11	September 1994	978-4-592-12133-6
12	November 1994	978-4-592-12140-4

== Re-released Volumes ==
No.	Japanese release date	Japanese ISBN
01	February 19, 2009	4-592-19801-8
02	February 19, 2009	4-592-19802-6
03	March 5, 2009	4-592-19803-4
04	March 5, 2009	4-592-19804-2
05	March 19, 2009	4-592-19805-0
06	March 19, 2009	4-592-19806-9

== Hanasakeru Seishonen Special Edition ==
No.	Japanese release date	Japanese ISBN
01	March 4, 2011	978-4-592-19837-6
02	December 5, 2011	978-4-592-19838-3
03	November 5, 2012	978-4-592-19893-2
04	September 5, 2013	978-4-592-19894-9
05	June 5, 2014	978-4-592-19895-6

== Hanasakeru Seishōnen Premium Fan Book ==
No.	Title	Author	Publisher	Imprint	Release date	ISBN
1	Hanasakeru Seishōnen Premium Fanbook	Natsumi Itsuki	Hakusensha	Hana to Yume Comics Special	December 5, 2011	ISBN 978-4-592-19899-4
