= Akito Hyuga =

Fictional character in the anime series Code Geass: Akito the Exiled

- Code Geass character
- Akito as he appears in the anime
- First appearance: Code Geass: Akito the Exiled Episode 1: "The Wyvern Arrives"
- Created by: Kazuki Akane; Clamp
- Voiced by: Japanese: Miyu Irino, Ryōka Yuzuki; English: Micah Solusod, Apphia Yu

In-universe information
- Relatives: Shin Hyuga Shaing (brother)

Akito Hyuga (Japanese: 日向アキト, Hepburn: Hyūga Akito) is the protagonist of the original video animation (OVA) Code Geass: Akito the Exiled produced by Sunrise. Akito, a 17-year-old soldier who has lost his hometown, is a lieutenant in the European military from a unit consisting of teenagers under the command of Leila Malcal. Akito participates in a military operation on the European battlefront as a pilot of a mecha labeled as Knightmare Frame. Akito is cursed with a supernatural "Geass" caused by his half brother Shin Hyuga Shaing that he controls at will. During these mind attacks, Akito goes berserker in battlefield, thus receiving the title of "Hannibal's Ghost" (ハンニバルの亡霊). Akito sees spirits of his fallen comrades as part of his post-traumatic stress disorder, and during the story, he tries to overcome his grief.

The OVA's director Kazuki Akane created Akito, portraying as stoic in the series' beginning and showing his growth through his relationship with Leila. Akito is voiced by Miyu Irino in Japanese and Micah Solusod in English. His younger persona is voiced by Ryōka Yuzuki in Japanese and Apphia Yu in English.

Despite early negative comments from the media that Akito was too brooding, journalists praised Akito's character arc in the series not only due to how he faces his past but also stands out in the franchise in general for avoiding the common dark narratives from the television series, Code Geass: Lelouch of the Rebellion.

== Creation ==
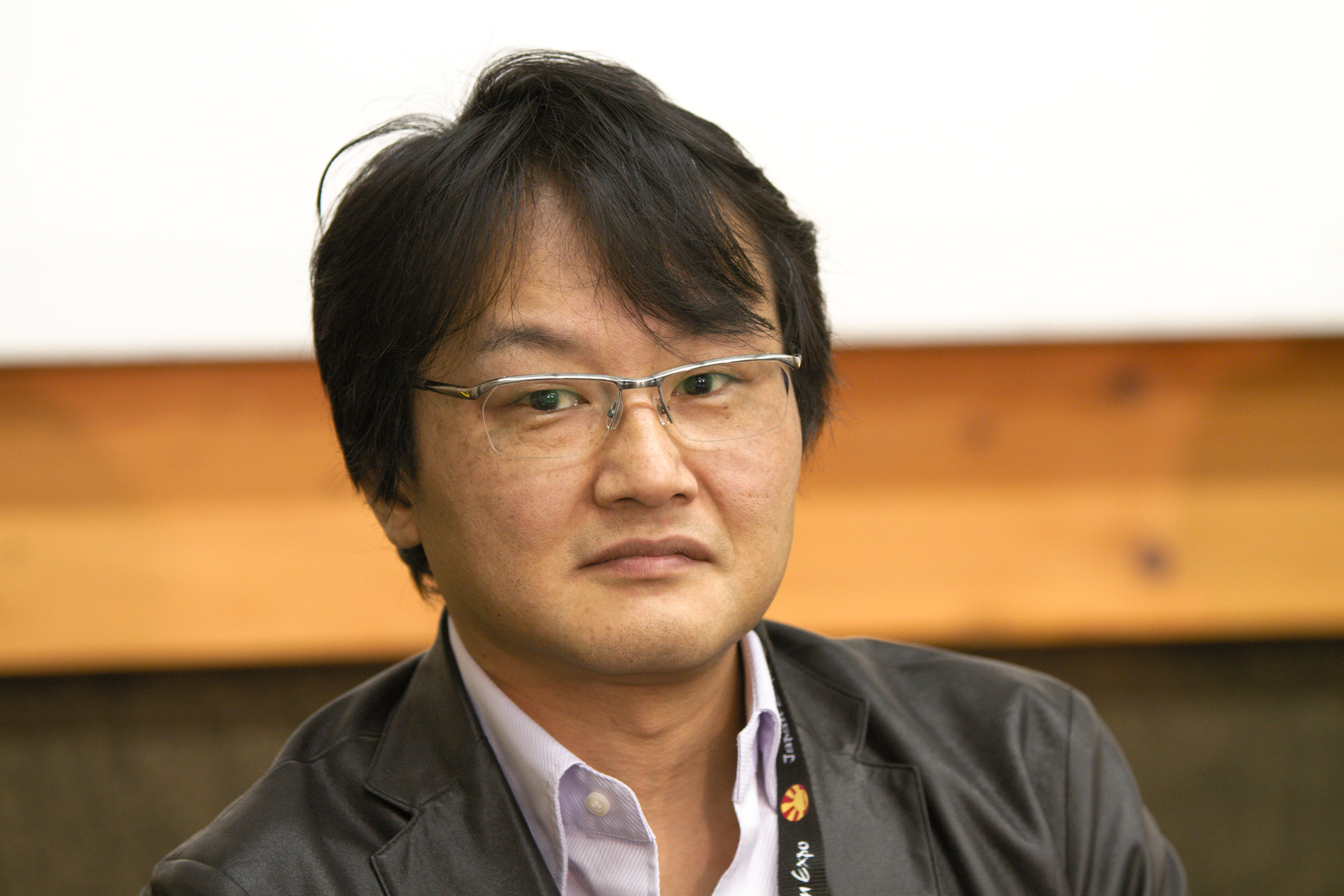
Director Kazuki Akane.

Akito Hyuga was created by Code Geass: Akito the Exiled anime director Kazuki Akane who often aimed to initially display the protagonist as a fighter seemingly possessed. However, in following episodes of the original video animation (OVA) series, the protagonist would become more expressive. The staff found it difficult to properly display Akito's expressions in the first episodes. His design was made by manga artists known as Clamp. Akito's braids were initially unpopular within the Sunrise female staff. In the making of the series, Sunrise expressed the need to show how different is Akito from Leila; Akito is skilled at operating the machine. On the other hand, Leila Malkal is not familiar with the operation so they made her stagger when landing on the ground to emphasize that. They gave distinguishable characters to each machine to give the impression that it is the characters who are actually operating the machines.

Starting the third episode of the OVA, the staff made sure that through the exchanges between Akito and Leila, the former's characterization is shown further depths, most notably his misrelationship with his brother Shin which helped to foreshadow future events of the narrative. The staff was pleased with their handing Akito, his relationships and dreams. This was further shown by making Akito make an honest smile for the first time in the series. Miyu Irino enjoyed interacting with Maaya Sakamoto as she was the one voicing Leila. For the following episode, designer Kimura said that his favorite scene was when Akito is brainwashed by Shin to kill Leila but manages to ignore such order. The scene of Akito's Knightmare holding her like a princess was noted to stand out within the Code Geass franchise due to how other princesses are often the subject of being victims in the television series and instead felt more fitting of Akane's previous works, most notably The Vision of Escaflowne. In the trailer for the final episode, there is a figure of Leila holding Akito's pigtails, and that picture was found meaningful by artist Takahiro Kimura.

In the finale, Irino said not were only highlights were the battle scenes alone, or new mechas but also the duel between Akito and Shin. He does think it is an exaggeration to say that it was drawn with overwhelming force, and it would not be an exaggeration to say that it was the culmination of everything the cast done so far. Regarding Akito's growth from the first chapter to the final chapter, he felt in the beginning, Akito acted like a robot carrying out a mission, with little emotion. In contrast, the Akito from the finale acts more like a human according to Irino. Akane added he drew it with the intention of returning from a cold, cool, crazy man to the original Akito. In the end, he personally thought that he became a character who would be protected like the heroine Leila.

For the English dub of the series, Akito was voiced by Micah Solusod.

== Appearances ==
=== Code Geass: Akito the Exiled ===
Akito Hyuga is introduced as a young soldier fighting for the forces of the United Republic of Europia. Despite his stoic personality, Akito suffers a rage when fighting as his eyes flashes red lights and he keeps saying "kill". In the first episode, the young soldier remains as the single survivor using his skills as a mecha pilot, better known as Knightframe. He befriends Lieutenant Colonel Leila Malcal at a party and soon Leila becomes interested in knowing more about him. The two stop a terrorist attack perpetrated by trio of Japanese soldiers, who wanted to kidnap Europa United General Gene Smilas. In exchange for sparing their lives, Leila has terrorists Ryo Sayama, Ayano Kosaka and Yukiya Naruse join her Wyvern Squad alongside Akito. After quelling distrust with her new recruits, Leila leads the team in a mission with the European Union Army to push back the invading Britannian army. There, Akito meets his brother Shin Hyuga Shaing, the enemy responsible for his mental stress and uses his power to make him commit suicide. However, Akito is saved from the curse by Ryo. After the encounter, Wyvern is forced to start living with Romani women until their way home. During their stay, Akito and Leila bond upon telling each other's past. Akito and Shin were close halfbrothers Akito confesses that during his childhood, Shin used his Geass to order a toddler Akito to kill himself. However, because Akito had no clear understanding about what death was, he could not carry his order and started suffer mental damage.

After leaving Romani, the Wyverns board the leading Ark Fleet ship and sink it during an operation. In the mission, Akito succumbs to Shin's Geass, and nearly kills Ashley. As they manage to survive, the remaining forces of the Knights of St. Leilah arranges a meeting with Shin who commands Akito to kill her but the brother resiste the Geass command.

Michael assemble to launch a final assault on Castle Weisswolf against the W-0, along with their new ally Ashley. Although the Wyverns take down most of their forces, Shin remains superior. Leila then awakes her own Geass which causes the late people to confront Shin and release Akito from his mental damage. The fight continues as Akito's and Shin's Knightframes are damaged and start fighting with swords. As Shin is about to kill his brother, Jean intervenes and shoots him as she is also killed by Shin. Shin succumbs to his wounds next to Jean's body and tells Akito to return to his friends. After time passes, The Wyvern Squad retires as Akito and Leila start a relationship.

=== Other appearances ===
Akito's design also appears in the video game Tales of Xillia 2. Merchandising based on him was also released. In 2016, a collaboration with a cafe using the images of Akito was made in Kobe. The character is also featured in the video game Code Geass: Genesic Re;Code. He is among those who have appeared in Fimbulwinter from different periods of time who agree to work together to restore the world. Akito and his friends also make a minor appearance in the spin-off Code Geass: Rozé of the Recapture taking down mechanoid beings created by the NeoBrtinnnia forces.

== Reception ==
In an "Overseas Popular Character Top 5" from the magazine Newtype, Akito took third place behind Hachiman Hikigaya from My Youth Romantic Comedy Is Wrong, As I Expected and Yuichiro Hyakuya from Seraph of the End. Fandom Post listed Akito as the 15th best character of Code Geass praising his fighting abilities and his relationship with the cast from the OVA. Masaki Endo from Mantan Web praised Akito's development due to how he opens up with Leila as both talk about their respective pasts. Comic Book Resources stated that several of Akito's actions subverts the darkest tropes from the television series, comparing Akito's order to kill his superior in the form of Geass with Lelouch's accidental order on Princess Euphemia; While Euphemia is forced to kill several of innocent Japanese people due to the Geass, Akito manages to overcome his brother Geass and stop himself from murdering Leila, giving the scene a romantic tone. The eventual ending of the series where the duo abandon the military, breaking the idea that the Geass would curse any of its users and that embodies the series' ideals of free will. Game Rant also noticed a major difference in the handling of Akito and Lelouch's fights and ideals due to how optimistic the former becomes thanks to Leila's aid and how after his final battle with Shin, the cast decides to live peacefully in contrast to how Lelouch decides to do dirty work in the world before his eventual arranged death.

ImpulseGamer feared that Akito might come across as a brooding archetype based on his quite personality which contrasts his insanity when fighting which he still enjoyed though. Anime News Network was more critical to the handling of Akito's personality due to how long it takes for his character to develop but still felt his battle enjoyable. Kotaku commented on the series' narrative positively, commenting on the philosophy that Akito suffers in regards to wanting to die which is rivaled by how Leila instead wants him to embrace the concept of living, an ideal that was briefly explored Lelouch of the Rebellion through Suzaku Kururugi's being ordered to live. Despite the character's nature and dark narrative, Sumikai enjoyed the Wyverns' rest as it helps to see a calmer side of themselves most notably the loner Akito or the rebellious Ashley. The Fandom Post agreed but still found the characters enjoyable as well as the handling of the pacing and how complex is Akito when seen properly. Besides Akito's past and how it is portrayed in the story, The Fandom Post found his growing relationship with Leila as one of the OVA's strongest point to the point Leila often feels as a more central character. Otaku USA felt the handling of Shin Hyuga to be entertaining for developing his brother but at the same time in a too simplistic way despite the franchise's fame for focusing on politics. Similarly, for the finale, Japaniac praised the fight between the two Hyuga brothers. Another relationship found appealing by the site was the one of Akito and Leila due to how they become connected by the power of Geass and develop a romantic bond. Although he found the ending appealing. Comic Book Resources found the duel between Akito and Shin tragic because of how the two make up before the latter's death.
