= Code Geass: Akito the Exiled =

Japanese OVA series

- Cover of the series' Western release

コードギアス 亡国のアキト (Kōdo Giasu: Bōkoku no Akito)
- Genre: Mecha
- Created by: Sunrise; Kazuki Akane
- Original video animation
- Directed by: Kazuki Akane
- Produced by: Hirofumi Inagaki; Yoshitaka Kawaguchi; Jun Yukawa; Osamu Hosokawa (#1–2); Shuusaku Iba (#1–2); Nobuaki Abe (#3–6); Hirotsugu Ogisu (#3–6)
- Written by: Hiroshi Ōnogi
- Music by: Ichiko Hashimoto
- Studio: Sunrise
- Licensed by: Crunchyroll LLC (Note: In North America through Crunchyroll (formerly known as Funimation) and in Australia through Crunchyroll Store Australia (formerly known as Madman Anime).)
- Released: August 4, 2012 – February 6, 2016
- Episodes: 5
- Light novel
- Written by: Ukyō Kodachi
- Published by: Kadokawa Shoten
- Original run: July 6, 2013 – June 25, 2016
- Volumes: 3

Code Geass: Akito the Exiled (Japanese: コードギアス 亡国のアキト, Hepburn: Kōdo Giasu: Bōkoku no Akito) is a Japanese anime original video animation (OVA) series and a spin-off to the main Code Geass series. It was created by Sunrise and directed by Kazuki Akane. The story is set in Europe during the Britannian invasion of the continent between Lelouch of the Rebellion's two seasons, focusing on the young soldier Akito Hyuga from the European Army and his superior Leila Malcal, both of whom are victims of a power known as Geass.

The five episode OVA originated from Sunrise's desire to produce a new work related to the franchise with Akane taking the director role despite his inexperience with it. Akane has cited both the Roman Empire and the 2011 earthquake as influences for the OVA's darker narrative. It was written by Hiroshi Ōnogi with music composed by Ichiko Hashimoto. In North America the series was released by Funimation and in Australia by Madman Entertainment.

Despite the OVA being commercially successful, critics have provided both positive and negative comments. Praise was given to the OVA's character-driven scenarios for how they handle the duo of Akito and Leila as both gradually develop their characters while bonding during war.

== Plot ==
In 2017 a.t.b, after the Black Rebellion, the allied nations of Europia United (E.U.) are being invaded by the Holy Britannian Empire. To fight back, the E.U. army forces forms the W-0 squadron, which includes Knightmare Frame pilot Akito Hyuga. Lieutenant Colonel Leila Malcal, a former Britannian aristocrat, joins the Europia forces, commanding the Wyvern Knightmare corps - a unit consisting of Japanese teenagers who recklessly enter the battlefield despite the extremely low survival rates.

As the war continues between Britannia and the E.U., Akito encounters his estranged brother Shin Hyuga Shaing, who serves as a leader of Britannian forces fighting to conquer Europia. Shin is revealed to be a geass user who has been manipulating Akito. Meanwhile, knight Suzaku Kururugi escorts strategist Julius Kingsley as the latter is deployed to St. Petersburg in order to take charge of the operational planning for the war effort being carried out by the forces of Euro Britannia against Europia. Shin discovers that Julius is Lelouch vi Britannia, brainwashed by the power of a geass, and imprisons both Lelouch and Suzaku. Shin usurps the position of the Grand Master of the Knights of St. Michael and takes control of the Euro Britannian forces.

As the war escalates, Akito and Leila learn that Shin's true objective is to seize enough military power to begin an open war between the three major superpowers: the Holy Britannian Empire, the Europia Union, and the Chinese Federation. Akito, Leila, and the Wyverns find they must defeat Shin as they fight for their freedom and for a home to which they can return to.

== Episodes ==
No.	Title	Directed by	Written by	Original release date	English release date
1	"The Wyvern Arrives"; Transliteration: "Yokuryū wa Maiorita" (Japanese: 翼竜は舞い降りた)	Kazuki Akane	Kazuki Akane, Miya Asakawa	July 16, 2012	June 27, 2017
2017 a.t.b. (Revolutionary Year 228), the war between Euro Britannia and the European Union (E.U.) continues. At a disadvantage, the E.U. army founded a special team consisting of Elevens—exiled Japanese who had their country occupied by Britannia—known as the W-0 Unit; one of these Elevens, Akito Hyuga, fights with great agility and savagely executes the enemy while apparently under the power of Geass. Elsewhere, Military Advisor Julius Kingsley and Knight of Seven Suzaku Kururugi are traveling by train to St. Petersburg.
2	"The Wyvern Divided"; Transliteration: "Hikisakareshi Yokuryū" (Japanese: 引き裂かれし翼竜)	Kazuki Akane	Kazuki Akane, Miya Asakawa, Hiroshi Ohogi	September 14, 2013	June 27, 2017
The new members of the W-0 unit attempt to desert, but this is prevented by Akito and Leila. The team (with Leila joining them) is then sent behind enemy lines to the city of Slonim, where they are ambushed by Euro Britannian forces led by Shin, Akito's brother. Akito, Leila, and the three Japanese recruits manage to survive, as a result of the BRS synchronization phenomenon. Meanwhile, Suzaku Kururugi and Julius Kingsley have arrived in St. Petersburg from the Britannian mainland.
3	"The Brightness Falls"; Transliteration: "Kagayaku Mono no Ten yori Otsu" (Japanese: 輝くもの天より堕つ)	Kazuki Akane	Kazuki Akane, Miya Asakawa, Hiroshi Ohogi	May 2, 2015	June 27, 2017
After the W-0 unit is denied access to head back to headquarters, they come across a group of elder gypsies who temporarily take them in; as they get along well, Akito and Leila reveal what happened when they were children and thus leading them to where they are now. Meanwhile, Julius Kingsley, revealed to be a brainwashed and dark side version of Lelouch Lamperouge, expresses his form of control as several leaders look on in awe and disgust.
4	"Memories of Hatred"; Transliteration: "Nikushimi no Kioku kara" (Japanese: 憎しみの記憶から)	Kazuki Akane	Kazuki Akane, Miya Asakawa	July 4, 2015	June 27, 2017
While W-0 is away, Leila and the remaining crew at base find themselves surrounded by Britannian Knightmares. Piloting the Vercingetorix, Shin Hyuuga leads the enemy charge, having usurped the position of Grand Master in the Knights of St. Michael. With her core members unavailable, it's up to Leila to protect her comrades, but this may be much tougher than she realizes: a spy lurking among them is finally ready to reveal himself. Left with no choice but to surrender, Leila arranges a meeting with Shin in order to ensure the safety of her squad. But as negotiations begin to fall apart, Akito and an unexpected ally return in the nick of time to turn things around.
5	"To Beloved Ones"; Transliteration: "Itoshiki Mono-tachi e" (Japanese: 愛シキモノタチヘ)	Kazuki Akane	Kazuki Akane, Miya Asakawa	February 6, 2016	June 27, 2017
The Ark Fleet has been destroyed, and a significant number of the enemy's troops have been wiped out due to its crash landing. As the remaining forces of the Knights of St. Michael regroup in order to launch a final assault on Castle Weisswolf, the W-0, along with their new ally Ashley Ashra, stand ready to intercept them. Meanwhile, with his Geass out of control, Shin moves to erase his younger brother's existence once and for all. But Akito, having promised Leila that he will come back alive, refuses to accept such a fate, and the two clash in their final battle. After their victory against Shin's troops, Akito, Leila and the other members of the Wyvern Squad retire. Shortly after, a young man named Rolo rescues Suzaku and Lelouch from the Euro Britannnian prison and informs them that Emperor Charles zi Britannia requests a new audience with Lelouch/Julius Kingsley.

== Production ==
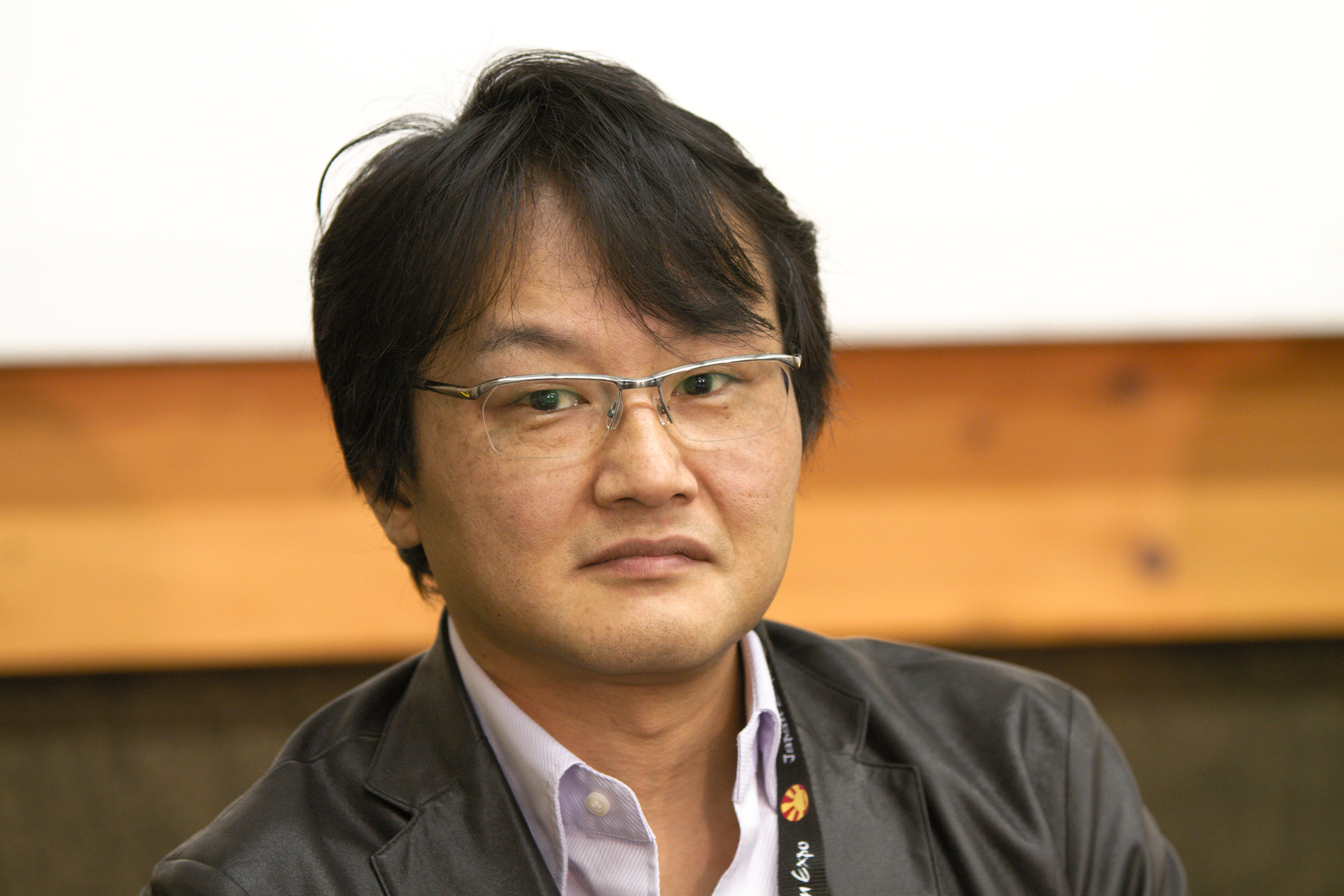
Director Kazuki Akane.

Sunrise producer Kawaguchi Yoshitaka asked Kazuki Akane to produce the OVAs when he was working on the retakes of the Birdy the Mighty: Decode 02 in 2009. Though had heard of the title, Akane watched none of it. He remembers watching the first two episodes and was surprised with the involvement of the mangaka group Clamp as character designers. He was amazed that they were drawing such intense characters with their personal touch and all for a TV series. Furthermore, he felt they drew all of the mechanical action so well by hand. Kawaguchi who came to him and proposed the OVA concept. Back when he was at Sunrise quite a long time ago, Kawaguchi and him worked a together with his working on production progress and his working on staging. Despite Akane not feeling fitting for such project, Kawaguchi claimed he needed a new staff member due to Goro Tanaguchi not being available. His impression was that it was a production packed with elements that the viewers wanted to see providing plenty of twists and turns. The producers also gave me their suggestion, so at that point he thought he would consider Europe and the E.U. Akane was absorbed in the history of the Roman Empire which led to a similar experience in the writing of the OVA. Due to Code Geass' fame within the fandom, Akane expressed pressure when making the second OVA, aiming to give the audience a present through it. The narrative was conceived by the director to give the series a darker tone than the television series inspired by the recent 2011 Tōhoku earthquake and tsunami. In order to produce more original concepts, Akane made the story to focus on Europe to contrast the setting from the previous series.

Akito the Exiled was directed by Akane who claims it took five years to develop the Code Geass spin-off. Since Code Geass had its own source material, Akane does not regard the OVAs to be material that he completely created which left to his desire to create his own work in the next years, Stars Align. In contrast to the original Code Geass: Lelouch of the Rebellion that used hand-drawn animation, the OVAs use 3D animation for the mechas' fights, an idea proposed by the producer. Akane originally had doubts in regards to this decision, fearing a possible reject from the staff, he was instead glad that the idea approved in order to bring more innovative elements to the franchise. While still claiming that the animation should be hand drawn, Akane added that humans should still be made through regular work. The CG director was Sato Gochu. They gave distinguishable characters to each machine to give the impression that it was the characters who are actually operating the machines. The backgrounds were created using CG as well and helped making the action scenes more exiting. Modeler Kana Kojima compared the art boards of Gallia Grande and Castle Weiss-Wolf with the completed CG and explained how he added color, taints, shades, depth, and light reflection. The animation was in general challenging to do in retrospective.

Takahiro Kimura returned for character designs and Akira Yasuda returns to do the Knightmare designs. The first OVA was first screened in cinemas in an unknown time. The visual aspect of that was large for Akane. Clamp drew a character for him, and when he saw it he was pleased. The team then began to create concurrent mechanical action using Orange and 3D computer graphics, and once they had a Knightmare Frame movie piece put together and as Akane saw it and enjoyed it. Among multiple bulky character, the brainwashed Lelouch stands out as a thin person called "ku" who Kimura drawn to give sex appeal. Kimura also wanted the Wyvern Squard to have a Romani-like uniformed feel to it, but failed to give such style.

=== Release ===
The new Code Geass series was first revealed on December 5, 2009. In Japan, the series was released in a total of four home media releases and a Blu-ray box on January 29, 2019. Along with the two seasons of the television series, the OVAs are licensed by Funimation. It was also screened in Otakon 2016. In January 2016, Manga Entertainment, who licensed the series in the UK, listed that they would release the first two episodes on Blu-Ray with an English dub on December 5, 2016. They later changed the date to April 10, 2017, and as of most recently the release is now scheduled to be on October 1, 2017. Originally intended to be released in four chapters, production of a fifth Akito the Exiled episode was announced after the Japanese debut of the third entry on May 2, 2015.Madman Entertainment has also released the first three episodes on DVD. Funimation announced that they would release the series in early 2017. On March 15, 2017, Funimation officially announced the pre-order and release date, June 27, 2017. The release will be a Blu-ray and DVD Combo pack with both subbed and dubbed audio. The picture drama has been released in only Japan and Italy. Ukyō Kodachi wrote a novelization of the OVA published by Kadokawa Shoten.

== Reception ==
The first episode earned US$447,630 on 30 screens for a per-screen total of US$14,921. Next episodes also were screened and appeared in the box office but without numbers, while home media releases also sold well.

ImpulseGamer praised the first episode for the handling of the pacing but feared that Akito might come across as a brooding archetype based on his quiet personality which contrasts his insanity when fighting; The fight scenes were received positively from ImpulseGamer. Kotaku commented on the series' narrative positively, commenting on the philosophy that Akito suffers in regards to wanting to die which is rivaled by how Leila instead wants him to embrace the concept of living, an ideal that was briefly explored Lelouch of the Rebellion through Suzaku's being ordered to live. Meanwhile, Leila was compared with Lelouch, seeing the heroine as her counterpart for rejecting the idea of becoming a criminal or obtaining life in contrast to Lelouch's life across the television series and his resurrection. In conclusion, they felt that the series' narrative made the franchise more complex for dealing more with the grey morality. Despite the character's nature and dark narrative, Sumikai enjoyed the Wyverns' rest as it helps to see a calmer side of themselves most notably the loner Akito or the rebellious Ashley. The Fandom Post agreed but still found the characters enjoyable as well as the handling of the pacing and how complex is Akito when seen properly. Besides Akito's past and how it is portrayed in the story, The Fandom Post found his growing relationship with Leila as one of the OVA's strongest point to the point Leila often feels as a more central character.

Otaku USA felt the series' beginning to be nihilist for the handling of Shin Hyuga as the main villain but felt latter episodes were more entertaining for developing his brother but at the same time in a too simplistic way despite the franchise's fame for focusing on politics. Anime News Network was more critical to the OVA, finding it to lack the appeal of the original series due to the different staff working on it, mostly due to Akane's works in general. Despite criticizing the character focused scenes on Akito, Anime News Network enjoyed the handling of latter scenes, due to how properly he is developed. As a result, the reviewer found that Akito the Exiled is more striking on its own rather than as a Code Geass spin-off.

For the finale, Japaniac praised the fight scenes, most notably the one between the two Hyuga brothers. Besides their fight, the reviewer was amazed by how the staff focuses on their past and how was their relationship. Another relationship found appealing by the site was the one of Akito and Leila due to how they become connected by the power of Geass and develop a romantic bond. Although he found the ending appealing, Japaniac commented that there were still some parts from the narrative left to be explored and that the inclusion of Lelouch and Suzaku in the ending could only be understood by returning fans. Kotaku criticized the handling of the mechas' animation for being too different from the Knightmares from the television series. Japaniac still enjoyed the choreography given to the Knightmare fights. Sumikai enjoyed the fights but at the same time felt that they were overshadowed by how the soldiers use tactics rather than direct combat to take the advantage. Anime News Network also criticized the English dub of most of the European characters as they use a poor accent when talking as well as the use of CGI.
