= List of The Vision of Escaflowne episodes =

The Vision of Escaflowne Limited Edition box set, released in North America by Bandai Entertainment on July 23, 2002

This is a complete episode listing for the anime series The Vision of Escaflowne. It aired in TV Tokyo from April 2 to September 24, 1996.

== Episode listing ==
No.	English title (Translated title)	Storyboarder	Directed by	Written by	Animation supervisor	Original release date	English airdate
1	"Fateful Confession"; Transliteration: "Unmei no kokuhaku" (Japanese: 運命の告白)	Kazuki Akane	Yoshiyuki Takei	Shōji Kawamori	Hiroshi Ōsaka	April 2, 1996	February 26, 2001 (YTV)
While training with her boyfriend Susumu Amano, 15-year-old Hitomi Kanzaki meets a boy named Van Fanel fighting a dragon, before he gets teleported to Earth. After killing the dragon and taking the heart, Van and Hitomi are transported back to Gaea, a world where the Earth and Moon hang in the sky.
2	"The Girl From the Mystic Moon"; Transliteration: "Maboroshi no tsuki no shōjo" (Japanese: 幻の月の少女)	Kazuki Akane	Takeshi Yoshimoto	Ryōta Yamaguchi	Shigeki Kuhara	April 9, 1996	August 19, 2000 (Fox Kids); September 11, 2000 (YTV)
Hitomi and Van go to the Kingdom of Fanelia, where Van plans to perform a rite of passage and become king. Hitomi meets the cat-girl and Van's childhood friend Merle, though she dislikes Hitomi. Van's mentor, Balgus, promises to help find a way to return Hitomi home after Van's coronation, but it is interrupted when the kingdom is invaded by cloaked Guymelefs. Van makes a blood pact with a powerful Guymelef called Escaflowne he pilots to fight the enemy Guymelefs. After witnessing the devastation, Van and Hitomi escape in a strange pillar of light.
3	"The Gallant Swordsman"; Transliteration: "Karei naru kenshi" (Japanese: 華麗なる剣士)	Shogo Koumoto	Shogo Koumoto	Ryōta Yamaguchi	Hiroki Kanno	April 16, 1996	August 26, 2000 (Fox Kids); September 18, 2000 (YTV)
Van and Hitomi are separately end up near the land of Asturia. Hitomi is attacked but a knight appears and saves her. The man is Allen, the commander of the fortress on the outskirts of Asturia resembling Amano, whom Hitomi infatuates.
4	"The Diabolical Adonis"; Transliteration: "Mashō no bishōnen" (Japanese: 魔性の美少年)	Yoshiyuki Takei	Yoshiyuki Takei	Akihiko Inari	Takahiro Komori	April 23, 1996	September 2, 2000 (Fox Kids); September 25, 2000 (YTV)
A sick and injured Merle is brought to the castle. She tells Hitomi and Van that the Guymelefs have completely destroyed Fanelia. Hitomi, Van, Allen, and his crew try to escape in Allen's ship, The Crusade, but it turns out the enemy Guymelefs can fly. In order for the others to escape, Van and Escaflowne (in a dragon form) distract the enemy.
5	"Seal of the Brothers"; Transliteration: "Kyōdai no kokuin" (Japanese: 兄弟の刻印)	Shinichirō Watanabe	Shinichirō Watanabe	Hiroaki Kitajima	Hiroshi Ōsaka	April 30, 1996	September 9, 2000 (Fox Kids); October 2, 2000 (YTV)
When Van gets captured by the Guymelefs and imprisoned by Zaibach, the ship's crew follows them. Van meets his long-lost older brother, Folken.
6	"City of Intrigue"; Transliteration: "Sakubou no miyako" (Japanese: 策謀の都)	Shogo Koumoto	Takeshi Yoshimoto	Ryōta Yamaguchi	Hiroki Kanno, Yasuhiro Irie (co-operating)	May 7, 1996	September 16, 2000 (Fox Kids); October 9, 2000 (YTV)
The group arrives to the capital of Asturia and meets up with Princess Millerna. While meeting the King of Asturia, Allen learns that King Aston is under Zaibach's control. When Van follows and confronts Folken, he tells him of how he joined Zaibach. Dilandau attempts to kill Van in revenge for the previous confrontation, but Hitomi saves him. Aston tests Van by having him fight three opponents, though Allen recognizes they are all mercenaries.
7	"Unexpected Partings"; Transliteration: "Yokisenu wakare" (Japanese: 予期せぬ別れ)	Yoshiyuki Takei	Yoshiyuki Takei	Akihiko Inari	Shigeki Kuhara	May 14, 1996	September 23, 2000 (Fox Kids); October 16, 2000 (YTV)
Van defeats his opponents. The heartbreaking Hitomi leaves Allen when he makes love with Millerna. Van saves Hitomi when she is kidnapped, but they are ambushed by Dilandau soon after.
8	"The Day the Angel Flew"; Transliteration: "Tenshi no mau hi" (Japanese: 天使の舞う日)	Shinichirō Watanabe	Shinichirō Watanabe	Hiroaki Kitajima	Takurō Shinbo, Hirokazu Hisayuki	May 21, 1996	September 30, 2000 (Fox Kids); October 23, 2000 (YTV)
Van, Hitomi, and Merle escape from Asturia, and pass by a dragon graveyard where Zaibach is harvesting drag energists. Van fails to infiltrate the storehouse when Hitomi is taken hostage. Merle distracts the military and Van destroys the storehouse. The explosion forms a crater on the ground where Van sprouts angel wings and saves Hitomi from falling. Meanwhile, Millerna saves Allen from being captured, before leaving and following Hitomi and Van.
9	"Memories of a Feather"; Transliteration: "Hane no kioku" (Japanese: 羽根の記憶)	Kazuki Akane	Takeshi Yoshimoto	Ryōta Yamaguchi	Takahiro Komori	May 28, 1996	–
Hitomi learns of Van's past: his mother was a Draconian, a winged descendant of the people of Atlantis. Meanwhile, the Crusade heads to the Duchy of Freid and Millerna leaves Asturia to find Allen. On the way to Freid, Hitomi and Van survive the ambush, but Allen gets injured from defeating the Dragonslayers and forcing Dilandau to retreat.
10	"The Blue-Eyed Prince"; Transliteration: "Aoki hitomi no ouji" (Japanese: 青き瞳の王子)	Shogo Koumoto	Shogo Koumoto	Akihiko Inari	Hiroshi Ōsaka	June 4, 1996	October 7, 2000 (Fox Kids); October 30, 2000 (YTV)
The group arrives in Freid, where they meet Millerna's nephew, Prince Chid. Plactu, a powerful monk, was ambushed and killed by a doppelgänger Zongi. Miguel, a soldier of Zaibach, was captured and imprisoned. Zongi captures Hitomi, and tricks Chid and his army into framing Van, Allen, and Millerna. Zongi betrays and kills Miguel from leaving Fried, while Van is captured and imprisoned with the others.
11	"Prophecy of Death (Edited Dub Title: Prophecy of Doom)"; Transliteration: "Shi no yogen" (Japanese: 死の予言)	Yoshiyuki Takei	Yoshiyuki Takei	Hiroaki Kitajima	Takurō Shinbo	June 11, 1996	October 21, 2000 (Fox Kids' Final Airing); November 6, 2000 (YTV)
Hitomi is brought in to be interrogated by Zongi disguised as "Plactu". She sees the truth about him and has a vision about their deaths. Hitomi falls unconscious but Van saves her. Chid and the people of Freid apologize to Van, Hitomi, Allen, and Millerna. Dilandau kills Zongi at the temple in retaliation for Miguel, before fighting Van and Hitomi. However, the two escape and return to Freid, where they are absolved of the charges.
12	"The Secret Door"; Transliteration: "Himitsu no tobira" (Japanese: 秘密の扉)	Shinichirō Watanabe	Takeshi Yoshimoto	Ryōta Yamaguchi	Takurō Shinbo, Tetsuya Yanagisawa (co-operating)	June 18, 1996	November 13, 2000 (YTV)
Duke Freid arrives at the castle and is recruited by Allen. Van asks Hitomi to predict where Zaibach will attack from, but she refuses. She leaves him upset, but talks to Chid and gives him a tarot reading, which reveals to her that Chid was born from a forbidden love. Meanwhile, Millerna reads a diary from her late sister Marlene, revealing that she and Allen had a relationship, and that Allen is Chid's biological father. The next day, Zaibach arrives and Freid declares war.
13	"Red Destiny"; Transliteration: "Akai unmei" (Japanese: 赤い運命)	Shogo Koumoto	Shogo Koumoto	Akihiko Inari	Hiroki Kanno	June 25, 1996	November 20, 2000 (YTV)
The Freid forces defending the capital sacrifice themselves so Freid and the others can escape. They head to Fortuna Temple, where Freid tells everyone how he possesses the power of Atlantis, which ended up causing the destruction of that nation a countless number of years before. Hitomi learns that Van is trying to become one with Escaflowne when he fights, so he will not have to rely on her ability see the unseen in battle. The battle culminates at the temple and Freid dies surrendering the power over to Zaibach. As Chid presents Folken with the power at Fortuna Temple, the damaged Escaflowne returns to the fleeing Crusade.
14	"Dangerous Wounds"; Transliteration: "Kiken na kizuato" (Japanese: 危険な傷跡)	Yoshiyuki Takei	Yoshiyuki Takei	Hiroaki Kitajima	Shigeki Kuhara	July 2, 1996	November 27, 2000 (YTV)
The wounded Van leaves Escaflowne and Hitomi learns that his injuries match the damage on it. They meet Millerna's fiancé Dryden, and request the Ispanos to fix Escaflowne and heal Van. Dilandau and the Dragonslayers approach the ship before Van fights them again. However, after seeing their ghosts, Van collapses along with Escaflowne, which turns black.
15	"Lost Paradise"; Transliteration: "Ushinawareta rakuen" (Japanese: 失われた楽園)	Junichi Sato	Ikurō Satō	Ryōta Yamaguchi	Takahiro Komori	July 9, 1996	December 4, 2000 (YTV)
Hitomi touches Escaflowne and saves Van from being stranded in the world of the dead, before escaping. Hitomi talks to Allen and inadvertently admits that she loves him. Hitomi leaves him upset, but is asked for advice about "a friend" from Millerna, who is herself unsure if she should pursue Allen or marrying Dryden. That night, two leopard women infiltrate the ship in Zaibach Guymelefs and ambush Van, but spare him when Merle intervenes. Dryden thinks he has discovered a way to the Mystic Valley, and the ship heads there.
16	"The Guided Ones"; Transliteration: "Michibikareshi mono" (Japanese: 導かれし者)	Shinichirō Watanabe	Takeshi Yoshimoto	Akihiko Inari	Takurō Shinbo, Tetsuya Yanagisawa	July 16, 1996	December 11, 2000 (YTV)
The leopard women, Naria and Eriya, report to Folken while Dilandau is sent back to Zaibach by the sorcerers. Dryden leads the Crusade to the Mystic Valley while reading from a diary from Allen's father. It tells about his journey to the Mystic Valley and how Allen's father met Hitomi's grandmother years before. The ship reaches the Mystic Valley, but the Zaibach forces are right behind.
17	"The Edge of the World"; Transliteration: "Kono yo no hate" (Japanese: この世の果て)	Shogo Koumoto	Shogo Koumoto	Ryōta Yamaguchi	Hiroshi Ōsaka	July 23, 1996	January 1, 2001 (YTV)
In the Mystic Valley, Van discovers the fall of Fanelia, Allen discovers the truth about what happened to his father and confronts him, while Hitomi learns from Van's mother that it was her fault bad things had happened. With the power of her mind amplified by her fortune-telling, Hitomi has caused fate to turn for the worse. Naria and Eriya head to the Mystic Valley, but Escaflowne transports everyone away.
18	"The Gravity of Destiny"; Transliteration: "Unmei no inryoku" (Japanese: 運命の引力)	Yoshiyuki Takei	Yoshiyuki Takei	Akihiko Inari	Takurō Shinbo, Tetsuya Yanagisawa	July 30, 1996	–
Van's mother gives him a new energist before vanishing. Allen, Hitomi, and Van are transported to Zaibach where they meet Dornkirk. Dornkirk tells them how he came to become the man they know today, and imprison them. The sorcerers attempt to dismantle Escaflowne and kill Van, but Hitomi shares the painful burden with Van, and for him to connect with Escaflowne, before being transported out of Zaibach.
19	"Operation Golden Rule of Love"; Transliteration: "Koi no ōgonritsu sakusen" (Japanese: 恋の黄金律作戦)	Yūji Yamaguchi	Ikurō Satō	Ryōta Yamaguchi	Hiroki Kanno	August 6, 1996	January 8, 2001 (YTV)
To try to keep their "ideal future", Dornkirk tries to separate Hitomi from Van by using his "fate alteration machine" to create love between Hitomi and Allen. Hitomi resists at first, insisting to Allen that Millerna loves him, but in the end they are both manipulated. Van discovers them together and immediately leaves.
20	"False Vows"; Transliteration: "Itsuwari no chigiri" (Japanese: 偽りの契り)	Shōji Kawamori	Takeshi Yoshimoto	Akihiko Inari	Takahiro Komori	August 13, 1996	–
Naria and Eriya undergo a procedure, transforming them into nearly-invincible "Luck Warriors". Millerna asks Hitomi to do a tarot card reading about her upcoming marriage. Hitomi obliges and notices that the interfering invasion will have a bad ending, so Millerna and Allen will become secret lovers. In a failed attempt to change fate, Hitomi lies to Millerna, saying that the marriage will be lucky. Hitomi confirms her mistake after having a vision, but not in time to stop the wedding. When Naria and Eriya attack the town, Hitomi confirms that her unlucky tarot card has been finalized. To make amends with the others, Hitomi surrenders to Naria and Eriya.
21	"Reaction of Fortune"; Transliteration: "Kōun no hansayō" (Japanese: 幸運の反作用)	Yoshihiro Takamoto	Shogo Koumoto	Hiroaki Kitajima	Yasuhiro Irie, Toshiyuki Tsuru (co-operating)	August 20, 1996	January 15, 2001 (YTV)
The two leopard women with increased luck start having a negative reaction to the implanted luck, and are forced to retreat and leave Hitomi behind. Eriya returns to Folken, but inadvertently leaves Naria behind. Back in the castle, Hitomi is kidnapped by Naria, unbeknownst to Van and the others. Even though Naria is injured, Hitomi accompanies and saves her. Van plans to stop Folken since he cannot fight the increased luck warriors, but the cat women abandon Hitomi and intervene. After Eriya and Naria die from the aftereffects of the luck operation, Folken defies Dornkirk.
22	"The Black Winged Angel"; Transliteration: "Kuroki tsubasa no tenshi" (Japanese: 黒き翼の天使)	Nobuhiro Kondō	Yoshiyuki Takei	Ryōta Yamaguchi	Hiroshi Ōsaka	August 27, 1996	January 22, 2001 (YTV)
Hitomi accompanies Van to meet Folken in the ruins of Fanelia. When they arrive, land dragons attack and Van tries to fight them. Folken saves Hitomi from a dragon, and confesses his motivations for defecting from Fanelia to Zaibach. Folken saves Van from the dragons, and shows Van his wings, which have turned from white to pitch black. Folken tells Van that he wants not only everyone to create a peaceful world, but in a different manner than Dornkirk.
23	"Storm Premonition"; Transliteration: "Arashi no yokan" (Japanese: 嵐の予感)	Yoshihiro Takamoto	Ikurō Satō	Akihiko Inari	Hiroshi Takeuchi	September 3, 1996	January 29, 2001 (YTV)
Folken returns to Asturia with Van and Hitomi. He tells the council what happened and helps the military develop a plan of fighting back. Allen tells Hitomi of how he has fathered an illegitimate child, then proposes to her. The empire attacks before Hitomi can answer, and she experiences the battle as it is happening through Van. The horrified Hitomi makes a sad wish, causing her to vanish from a pillar of light and dismissed from Gaea.
24	"Fateful Decision"; Transliteration: "Unmei no sentaku" (Japanese: 運命の選択)	Kazuki Akane	Kazuki Akane	Hiroaki Kitajima	Shigeki Kuhara	September 10, 1996	February 5, 2001 (YTV)
Hitomi returns to Earth, but time seems to have rewound by a day. Back on Gaea, Allen finds his long-lost sister Celena. It is revealed that she was abducted and experimented by Zaibach years ago. Allen notices that he thought about Hitomi because she reminded him of Celena. At the cemetery, Celena, turning into Dilandau, is whisked away by a cloaked Guymelef piloted by his beastmen partner Jajuka. Merle encourages Van to bring Hitomi back to Gaea. Hitomi realizes that she loves and trusts Van. She returns to Gaea in a war-torn land.
25	"Zone of Absolute Fortune"; Transliteration: "Zettai kōun ken" (Japanese: 絶対幸運圏)	Shogo Koumoto, Kazuki Akane	Takeshi Yoshimoto	Akihiko Inari	Takahiro Komori, Hiroki Kanno	September 17, 1996	February 12, 2001 (YTV)
Van and Hitomi return to Asturia, but he and Allen leave to fight Zaibach's army. Hitomi accompanies Folken, and they enter a pillar of light to Zaibach. Folken destroys Dornkirk's body, before being killed by a broken sword shard. Hitomi's anguish triggers her stone pendant to glow and react with the fate machine. Returning as a ghost, Dornkirk tells Hitomi to stand by and watch the world be reborn, now that everything has gone according to plan. Meanwhile, Van senses and mourns Folken.
26	"Eternal Love"; Transliteration: "Eien no omoi" (Japanese: 永遠の想い)	Kazuki Akane	Yoshiyuki Takei	Ryōta Yamaguchi	Hiroshi Ōsaka	September 24, 1996	February 19, 2001 (YTV)
The war escalates and the allies begin to fight each other. Van inadvertently kills Jajuka, whose dying words cause Dilandau to revert into Celena. While sparing her, Van is persuaded by Allen. Hitomi manages to call Van telepathically and ends the war between the two. Van returns to the Zaibach base and reconciles with Hitomi. The angel feathers falling from the wings cause the soldiers to regain their composure. Dornkirk decides to surrender the plan and vanishes from Gaea forever, upon seeing the love between Van and Hitomi. As the world begins to peacefully rebuild, Van sends Hitomi back to Earth, telling her they will always remember each other.
