= List of The Vision of Escaflowne characters =

This is a list of characters for the anime series The Vision of Escaflowne.

== Protagonists ==
=== Hitomi Kanzaki ===
Voiced by: Maaya Sakamoto (Japanese); Kelly Sheridan (Bandai dub), Caitlin Glass (Funimation dub) (English)

Hitomi Kanzaki (神崎ひとみ, Kanzaki Hitomi) is the protagonist of The Vision of Escaflowne. An ordinary schoolgirl with a crush on her track team friend, Amano, she meets and saves the life of Van, a young prince from a different world who crossed through a portal to slay a dragon. Transported to Van's world, Gaea, she finds her fate is intertwined with his, even if her heart still belongs to Amano. She later meets Allen, a gallant knight who bears an uncanny resemblance to Amano, but realizes her true love is Van. Lost in Gaea with no apparent way to return home, Hitomi finds that her hobby of tarot card reading is becoming frighteningly accurate, experiencing visions of both the past and future that shed light on the alien, war-torn world of Gaea.

Hitomi has a realistic personality; she is shy, caring, and forgiving, yet also has a temper. She is often afraid, but pushes herself to do the right thing. Reserved yet prone to displays of affection, she is mostly honest, only telling little white lies to benefit herself. She wants the best for others and herself as she seeks love and friendship. As a member of her school's track team, she is also a capable amateur athlete in long-distance running.

In the film, Hitomi is portrayed as being depressed and in a deep melancholy brought on by feelings of loneliness, which the story shows her slowly overcome. She also does not show an interest in tarot card reading or have psychic powers.

=== Van Fanel ===
Voiced by: Tomokazu Seki (Japanese); Kirby Morrow (Bandai dub), Aaron Dismuke (Funimation dub) (English)

Van Slanzar de Fanel (バァン・ファーネル, Baan Fāneru) is the young half-Draconian King of Fanelia, who must learn to cope with drastic changes in his life after Fanelia is destroyed by Zaibach. He pilots Escaflowne, a 8.09-meter (26.5 ft) Guymelef made by the mysterious Ispano tribe which can transform into a flying dragon. He earns his right to pilot Escaflowne through a blood pact which connects his body and soul to Escaflowne. Due to the pact and Hitomi's influence, Van becomes injured when the Escaflowne is damaged, and these wounds will not close until Escaflowne is repaired. Consequently, if Escaflowne is destroyed, Van will die.

His destiny and Hitomi's are linked, and he is initially dependent on her clairvoyant abilities, which save his life multiple times. He also holds a grudge against Folken for leaving his native Kingdom of Fanelia for Zaibach and Dornkirk for his grand ambitions. Due to being half-Draconian, Van is able to manifest a pair of feathered wings which enable him to fly. He initially treats Hitomi as a valued teammate, but falls in love with her as the series progresses.

=== Allen Schezar ===
Voiced by: Shin-ichiro Miki (Japanese); Brian Drummond (Bandai dub), Sonny Strait (Funimation dub) (English)

Allen Crusade Schezar (アレン・クルゼード・シェザール, Aren Kurusēdo Shezāru) is a member of the Knights Caeli, Asturia's elite knights, who bears an uncanny resemblance to Hitomi's high school crush, Susumu Amano.

When Allen was younger, his younger sister Celena was kidnapped by Zaibach, his father Leon mysteriously disappeared, and his mother died shortly afterwards. As a result of these events, Allen harbors anger towards Leon for leaving his mother and family behind. However, it is later revealed that Leon truly loved Allen's mother and was murdered by Dornkirk's soldiers for the secrets of Atlantis. The Princess Millerna of Asturia has a massive crush on him, but he also demonstrates strong feelings for Hitomi as the series progresses.

From a young age, Allen was a gifted swordsman, becoming one of Gaea's most skilled fighters under the expert tutelage of Balgus of Fanelia. During his early career as a knight, he and Princess Marlene fell in love and had a child, Chid. Later in the series, Allen briefly becomes romantically involved with Hitomi through Dornkirk's influence.

== Antagonists ==
=== Folken Fanel ===
Voiced by: Jōji Nakata (Japanese); Paul Dobson (Bandai dub), Vic Mignogna (Funimation dub) (English)

Folken Lacour de Fanel (フォルケン・ラクール・デ・ファーネル, Foruken Rakūru de Fāneru) is the Strategos or tactician of Zaibach, who is revealed to be Van's older brother and the original heir to Fanelia. After he failed to kill a dragon, he lost an arm to the beast and was later picked up by the Zaibach, who nursed him back to health under Dornkirk's instructions and fitted him with a mechanical arm. He originally joined the empire in hopes of realizing Zaibach's ideals of a world free of war, but later defects after becoming disillusioned. He, like Van, is half Draconian and also has angelic wings. However, his wings have turned black, a portent that his life is coming to an end. Folken dies when his sword breaks as he kills Dornkirk, striking him in the heart.

In the Escaflowne film, Folken is the main antagonist and rewritten as the leader of Zaibach.

=== Dilandau Albatou ===
Voiced by: Minami Takayama (Japanese); Andrew Francis (Bandai dub), Saffron Henderson (Celena, Bandai dub), Joel McDonald (Funimation dub), Lara Woodhull (Celena Funimation dub) (English)

Dilandau Albatou (ディランドゥ・アルバタウ, Dirandu Arubatau) is the leader of the Dragon Slayers, an elite group of Guymelef pilots in Dornkirk's army. Dilandau is a highly narcissistic, mentally unstable pyromaniac who abuses his soldiers while being emotionally dependent on them and gladly killing anyone who has caused them harm, such as the Doppelganger Zongi).

Towards the end of the series, it is revealed that Dilandau, initially depicted as a male, is actually Allen's lost sister Celena, who was brainwashed and mutated by Zaibach's fate alteration machines. Dilandau eventually regains his memory and returns to his original female form.

In the Escaflowne film, Dilandau's origins are changed, being a human who was infused with Draconian blood.

=== Emperor Dornkirk ===
Voiced by: Masato Yamanouchi (Japanese); Richard Newman (Bandai dub), Jeremy Schwartz (Funimation dub) (English)

Emperor Dornkirk (ドルンカーク, Dorunkāku) is the leader of Zaibach, believed to be two hundred Earth years old, and a former Earth scientist named Isaac. Isaac learned that physical attraction between matter is caused by the force of gravity. He thus believed that everything in the universe, including fate and destiny, is caused by a force and everything is governed by a universal law. His theories and discoveries led him to invent machines that can predict and change the future. Isaac was transported to Gaea and later became Emperor Dornkirk after "saving" the rural people of Zaibach with his knowledge.

Dornkirk continually looks into the future with his Destiny Prognostication Engine in order to create an ideal future for Gaea by unlocking the secrets of Atlantis, but Hitomi's visions of the future and Van's connection to Escaflowne continually interfere with his efforts. The future he seeks to create is the "zone of absolute fortune", in which everyone's wishes would come true. However, it is that very power that destroyed Atlantis.

Near the end of the series, Dornkirk successfully constructed his device to generate the "zone of absolute fortune". It was activated upon his death at the hands of Folken, which was immediately followed by Folken's own demise, a consequence of the workings of the machine. Dornkirk, who had been kept alive by various machinery, lingers as an incorporeal ghost to see how his experiment would turn out, vanishing upon the deactivation of his machine.

Frequently hinted at though never confirmed in the series, the character of Dornkirk was based on and may be the historical figure Sir Isaac Newton. Series writer and director Shoji Kawamori noted that Newton studied alchemy, even writing a book on it, and theorized Newton discovering the power of Atlantis.

== Supporting characters ==
=== Millerna Aston ===
Voiced by: Mayumi Iizuka (anime), Aki Takeda (film) (Japanese); Venus Terzo (Bandai dub), Colleen Clinkenbeard (Funimation dub) (English)

Millerna Aston is the third princess of the kingdom of Asturia, who is in love with Allen Schezar despite being betrothed to the merchant prince Dryden Fassa. Millerna's ambition was once to become a doctor, but she was forced to give up her medical studies by her second sister, Eries.

Her eldest sister, Marlene, is deceased, and was the wife of Duke Freid and the mother of Allen's son, Chid. Millerna later runs away from Asturia to join Van's troupe and fulfill her dreams. She is upset by her arranged engagement to Dryden, but gradually comes to appreciate her fiancé's good qualities. At the end of the series, however, they separate on good terms, with Dryden saying "I will come back when I'm more deserving of you." Millerna then realizes that she cannot depend on others to make her happy. When she was first introduced at the beginning of the series, she was not fond of Hitomi, but later in the series accepts her as a friend. Though she never finished medical school, she aids Hitomi and the others when she saved Allen from near death and Hitomi from a mental death.

=== Balgus Ganesha ===
Voiced by: Tessho Genda (Japanese); Don Brown (Bandai dub), Chris Guerrero (Funimation dub) (English)

Balgus (バルガス, Barugasu) is one of the "three master swordsmen of Gaea" and a general of Fanelia's army. An enormous man of great strength, he is capable of fighting and dismembering guymelefs (mecha) without piloting a guymelef himself. When he was younger, Balgus served under Van's father before leaving to travel Gaea and improve his skills. He met Allen and trained him for some time before returning to Fanelia to look after Van and his mother following the death of Van's father. When Zaibach destroyed Fanelia, he died while saving Van.

Though he perished early in the series, he continues to affect the lives of the main characters through his lasting influence as both a mentor to Van and teacher to Allen.

=== Merle ===
Voiced by: Ikue Ōtani (Japanese); Jocelyne Loewen (Bandai dub), Alexis Tipton (Funimation dub) (English)

Merle (メルル, Meruru) is a thirteen-year-old catgirl and childhood friend of Van. She is jealous of Van's increasingly close relationship with Hitomi, but eventually comes to accept Hitomi and becomes a loyal friend to her. As Van becomes conflicted in his relationship with Hitomi, Merle reveals to him that he loves Hitomi and that she had recognized his feelings long before he did. She encourages Van to leave and find Hitomi after she unexpectedly returns to the Mystic Moon, assuring him that his feelings will reach Hitomi.

An orphan, she has since devotedly followed Van since she was picked up by the Fanelian courts. She never hesitates to protect Van at all costs, risking her life to save him by hauling herself in front of twins Eriya and Naria, who spare Van when they see their past selves reflected in Merle.

=== Eriya and Naria ===
Voiced by: Narumi Hidaka and Yuri Amano (Japanese); Nicole Oliver and Janyse Jaud (Bandai dub), Felecia Angelle and Michelle Rojas (Funimation dub) (English)

Eriya (エリヤ) and Naria (ナリヤ, Nariya) are two eighteen-year-old leopard-girl sisters who serve Folken. Eriya has dark skin and gold hair, and Naria has light skin and silver hair. When they were children, their parents were killed by humans due to prejudice against their race. To avoid being captured and sold into slavery, they tried to commit suicide before being saved by Folken, who they fell in love with as they spent time with him. Just like Jajuka to Dilandau, they serve Zaibach only out of loyalty to Folken and do not truly believe in the empire's motives, being extremely overprotective of Folken and willing to do anything to protect him. They pilot different Guymelefs, called Teirings: Eriya pilots the Gold Teiring, and Naria pilots the Silver Teiring. They die after an experiment with their blood goes wrong, causing them to age at a rapid rate before dying in Folken's arms.

=== Jajuka ===
Voiced by: Kōji Tsujitani (Japanese); Scott McNeil (Bandai dub), Chuck Huber (Funimation dub) (English)

Jajuka (ジャジュカ) is a dog-like beast-man. He becomes the only soldier under Dilandau's command after the Dragon Slayers are killed in battle by Van. A former-servant of the Sorcerers who kidnapped Celena, he was responsible for her well-being as a child and genuinely cared for her; the two were almost inseparable. When Dilandau was returned to the Sorcerers years later, Jajuka volunteered to fight beside him.

=== Eries Aston ===
Voiced by: Yuri Amano (Japanese); Ellen Kennedy (Bandai dub), Morgan Lauré Garrett (Funimation dub) (English)

Eries Aston is the second princess of Asturia and Millerna's older sister. Because she refuses to marry, she is ineligible for the throne and the husband of her younger sister will inherit the throne of Asturia. She disapproves of her younger sister Millerna's decision to be a doctor and attempts to discourage her from pursuing both the study of medicine and Allen Schezar. She also agrees to look after Allen's sister, Celena, when she mysteriously reappears, though it is soon discovered that Celena is actually Dilandau.

=== Dryden Fassa ===
Voiced by: Jūrōta Kosugi (Japanese); Michael Dobson (Bandai dub), Eric Vale (Funimation dub) (English)

Dryden Fassa is a knowledgeable, successful, and generous merchant and part-time scholar. He is engaged to Millerna through his father Meiden, a friend of Asturia's king, though is aware that Millerna is in love with Allen Schezar. He genuinely cares for Millerna and claims that his altruistic actions, such as paying an immense repair fee for Escaflowne, are to get her attention. Though they are married later in the series, Dryden separates from Millerna and returns the ring, claiming that he is not worthy of her yet. When she warns that she might not wait for him, he expresses confidence that his great love for her will eventually be returned.

=== Mole Man ===
Voiced by: Chafurin (Japanese); Terry Klassen (Bandai dub), Mike McFarland (Fumination dub) (English)

The Mole Man is a mysterious petty thief who wanders the forest near Fanelia. However, he gains the trust of his companions and follows Allen's crew aboard the Crusade.

After Hitomi and Van are transported by a pillar of light to the woods bordering Fanelia and Asturia, Mole Man tries to steal Hitomi's pendant, but is thwarted by Allen's arrival. He later abets Van's unsuccessful attempt to escape from Fort Castelo and provides medicine for Hitomi and Merle's fevers.

Mole Man later accompanies Princess Millerna when she leaves Asturia to pursue Allen to the Duchy of Freid. When Allen is injured, Mole Man encourages Millerna to use her medical knowledge to save Allen. The Mole Man reappears shortly before Millerna's wedding and shows her the necklace she was looking for, observing that she used to "have a glow" about her that is now gone.

When Hitomi accompanies Van to Fanelia to confront Folken, the Mole Man appears from underneath Millerna's carriage to tell Gaddes, Allen, and the others that he saw them escaping to Fanelia. At the end of the series, he bids farewell to Hitomi as she returns to Earth.

In the film, the Mole Man is a prophet who travels with the Abaharaki. He is paid by Allen and foretells that Hitomi is the Wing Goddess, also helping craft her pendant.

=== Prince Chid ===
Voiced by: Minami Takayama (Japanese); Alex Doduk (Bandai dub), Bryn Apprill (Funimation dub) (English)

Prince Chid, pronounced "Sheed", is the heir to duchy of Freid and is supposedly the Duke of Freid and Princess Marlene's son, but his real father is Allen Schezar. After Duke of Freid died, Chid eventually became the Duke.

When Princess Marlene married Duke Freid, she never openly revealed the truth behind her pregnancy, but wrote about it in a hidden diary that was later found by Millerna. Chid displays a strong connection and trust for Allen, though is unaware of their true connection as father and son, and admires and hopes to live up to Duke Freid, the only father Chid has ever known. Though the Duke is apparently strict towards Chid, he recognizes Chid as his own son and cares for him deeply.

=== Yukari Uchida ===
Voiced by: Mayumi Iizuka (Japanese); Saffron Henderson (Bandai dub, series), Willow Johnson (Bandai dub, film), Jad Saxton (Funimation dub) (English)

Yukari Uchida is Hitomi's best friend and the manager of the track team. When she learns that Amano is going to study abroad, Yukari encourages Hitomi to confess her feelings to Amano. She witnesses Van's arrival on Earth and Hitomi being swept into a pillar of light to Gaea.

After Hitomi's disappearance, Yukari and Amano learn from Hitomi's mother that Hitomi's grandmother was once taken by a pillar of light when she was a girl, but returned. When Hitomi briefly returns to Earth about 24 hours before she disappeared, she relives events where she realizes that Yukari is in love with Amano. However, Yukari kept her feelings to herself and supported Hitomi, leading Hitomi to cryptically apologize before reliving her sprint for Amano, knowing that Van will appear again to take her to Gaea.

At the end of the series, it is revealed that Yukari and Amano become a couple.

=== Susumu Amano ===
Voiced by: Shin-ichiro Miki (Japanese); Brian Drummond (Bandai dub), Austin Tindle (Funimation dub) (English)

Susumu Amano (referred to by his surname Amano) is the captain of the Kamakura-Kita High School track club and Hitomi Kanzaki's crush. When Hitomi learns he is moving abroad, she asks him to give her first kiss if she sprints 100 m in 13 seconds. Hitomi's attempt is interrupted by the sudden appearance of Van and a dragon, ending with Hitomi being swept up in a pillar of light to Gaea and Amano being unable to grab onto her before she is taken. On Gaea, Hitomi meets Allen Schezar, who bears an uncanny resemblance to Amano.

Following Hitomi's disappearance, Amano tries to contact her through her pager. He and Yukari learn from Hitomi's mother that Hitomi's grandmother had once been taken away by a pillar of light during a summer festival and returned with the pendulum pendant she later gave Hitomi.

In the final episode, two girls are overheard discussing that Amano and Yukari are dating and make the "perfect couple."
