= See the World by Train =

- Also known as: Sekai no Shasō kara (世界の車窓から)
- Genre: Factual television
- Narrated by: Kenjirō Ishimaru
- Theme music composer: Hajime Mizoguchi
- Opening theme: "Sekai no Shasō kara"
- Ending theme: "Sekai no Shasō kara"
- Country of origin: Japan
- Original language: Japanese
- No. of episodes: Over 10,000

Production
- Production location: Worldwide
- Running time: 5 minutes
- Production companies: Telecom Staff Co., Ltd.

Original release
- Network: TV Asahi
- Release: June 1987

See the World by Train (世界の車窓から, Sekai no Shasō kara) is a Japanese short factual television programme broadcast daily by TV Asahi since June 1987. Produced by Telecom Staff and sponsored by Fujitsu, it follows railway journeys in various countries around the world, featuring people on board the trains and sights along the way.

== Broadcast times ==
11:10 - 11:15 Monday to Friday

== Countries covered ==
As of April 2016, 104 different countries have been featured, including the following:

- 23 January 2012 - 1 April 2012: Hungary
- 2 April 2012 - 10 June 2012: Switzerland
- 11 June 2012 - 9 September 2012: Southern India
- 10 September 2012 - 9 December 2012: France
- 10 December 2012 - 10 March 2013: Canada
- 11 March 2013 - 31 May 2013: Vietnam
- 3 June 2013 - 30 August 2013: Bangladesh
- 2 September 2013 - 29 November 2013: Sweden and Norway
- 2 December 2013 - 21 February 2014: Poland
- 3 March 2014 - 9 May 2014: Indonesia
- 12 May 2014 - 4 July 2014: Portugal
- 7 July 2014 - 22 August 2014: Morocco
- 25 August 2014 - 24 October 2014: Mongolia
- 27 October 2014 - 23 January 2015: Northern Italy, France, and Corsica
- 26 January 2015 - 3 April 2015: Australia
- 6 April 2015 - 5 June 2015: Thailand
- 8 June 2015 - 28 August 2015: Germany
- 31 August 2015 - 20 November 2015: Czech Republic and Slovakia
- 23 November 2015 - 5 February 2016: Finland
- 8 February 2016 - 6 May 2016: Northern India
- 9 May 2016 - 29 July 2016: Argentina and Uruguay

== Staff ==
The programme is narrated by actor Kenjirō Ishimaru, and the opening and ending theme was composed by Hajime Mizoguchi.

== Awards ==
See the World by Train received the First Memorial Award at the 2011 Festival Asia TV & Film on Journey event.

== History ==
First broadcast in June 1987, the programme was aired for the 10,000th time on 2 May 2016, making it the second-longest running TV show still being broadcast in Japan, after Tetsuko's Room, also aired by TV Asahi.
