= Demon Sacred =

Japanese manga series

- Cover of the first volume of Demon Sacred, as released by Hakusensha

デーモン聖典 (Dēmon Sakurīdo)
- Manga
- Written by: Natsumi Itsuki
- Published by: Hakusensha
- English publisher: NA: Tokyopop
- Magazine: LaLa
- Original run: March 2003 – August 2007
- Volumes: 11

Demon Sacred (Japanese: デーモン聖典, Hepburn: Dēmon Sakurīdo) is a manga written and illustrated by Natsumi Itsuki.

== Plot ==
The story begins with Rena and her husband Ichijima Ryota who are on their honeymoon in Finland. There, they see a lot of unicorns. When Rena touches one, it turns into a man with the appearance of Mika Valaska, her idol music composer. Her husband and the rest of the tour group she is with vanish when the unicorns touch them, leaving only their clothes behind.

Many years later, Shinobu, a scientist, is taking care of the two daughters of Rena, Mona and Rina. Rina is experiencing the mysterious "return syndrome" which causes people to vanish (in her case, at a slower rate). Shinobu is doing everything he can to find out how to reverse the effects and save her, but has so far been unsuccessful. Suddenly, Mika appears and tells the trio that he knows of a way to save Rina; however, it would require calling more demons into the world.

== Character ==
=== Human ===
Mona Koigusa (小井草 もな, Koigusa Mona)
Rina's younger twin-daughter, adopted by Shinobu. 14-year-old girl with the ability of Dragonslayer.
Rina Koigusa (小井草 りな, Koigusa Rina)
Mona's older twin-daughter, adopted by Shinobu. She contracted a mysterious disease called Returne Syndrome (逆行症候群(リターン・シンドローム), Ritān Shindorōmu) that reverses the time-space continuum of the patient. Despite being 14, she looks like a 9-year-old.
Shinobu Koigusa (小井草 忍, Koigusa Shinobu)
Took in both Rina and Mona after the death of their mother.
Keito Fujina (藤名 閨人, Fujina Keito)
Superstar actor and singer.

=== Demon ===
Mika (ミカ, Mika)
A demon with the appearance of a unicorn. Tamed by Rena, his "Sacred," he was sad at the fact that Rena would not grant him perpetual peace when she died, but has since decided to lead the other demons in search of other Edens and of Rena's reincarnation after the main events of the story. He has the appearance of Mika Valaska, the Finnish music composer that Rena idolized.
K2 (ケイツウ, Kei Tsū)
A demon of type apocalyptic demon. He was lured into the human world by Mika, then tamed by Mona. As he grew (through resting), he realized that Mona is his "Sacred." He has the appearance of Keito Fujina, Mona's idol, hence his name.

== Special terms ==
=== Demons ===
- Red Dragon (赤龍, reddo doragon): According to Mika, the strongest demon.
- Apocalyptic Beast: The second-strongest demon. K2 is the only one of this kind.
- Unicorn (ユニコーン, Yunikōn): Not very strong but intelligent and long-lived. Mika belongs to this type.
- Kaibutsu (怪物) (lit. strange creature)
- Oni (鬼) (lit. demons, devils, ogres or trolls)
- Kakoku
- Youkai (妖怪) (lit. demon, spirit, or monster)
- Yousei (妖精) (lit. bewitching spirit)
- Akuma (悪魔) (lit. devil)
- Griffin (グリフィン, Gurifin): Shuu belongs to this type.

=== Humans ===
Return Syndrome (逆行症候群(リターン・シンドローム), Ritān Shindorōmu)

The phenomenon in which people (and other living beings) on Earth that are not "Chains" (｢鎖｣, Kusari) (see below) disappear after coming into contact with a demon.

Chain

People who have the ability to summon demons to obey. They give a demon its name and appearance and are able to command the demon. Such people are very rare, about 1 in 100,000~1,000,000. They are also immune to Return Syndrome. Furthermore, the following principals concerning "Chains" hold true:

1. A demon cannot go against the sincere wishes of its "Chain."
2. A "Chain" may bound many demons. As a result, demons often seek "Chains" bound to other demons after detecting their presence.
3. A demon cannot bind to a "Chain" already bound to a demon of higher rank, since the higher-ranked demon would eat the lower-ranked demon before it can attempt to bind to the "Chain" out of possessiveness.
4. A demon cannot bind to another "Chain" so long as its "Chain" is still alive.
5. A demon cannot hurt or kill its own "Chain"

Sacred (聖典(サクリード), Seiten (Sakurīdo))

A "Chain" special to each individual demon that is able to grant the demon "death" through words of love.
