= Jyu-Oh-Sei =

Japanese manga and anime series

- Cover art of the first Jyu-Oh-Sei volume

獣王星 (Jūōsei)
- Genre: Science fiction, romance, Tragedy
- Manga
- Written by: Natsumi Itsuki
- Published by: Hakusensha
- English publisher: NA: Tokyopop
- Magazine: LaLa, Melody
- Original run: December 1993 – January 2003
- Volumes: 3
- Anime television series
- Directed by: Hiroshi Nishikiori
- Produced by: Masahiko Minami; Yukihiro Itō; Kōji Yamamoto; Yōko Matsuzaki
- Written by: Reiko Yoshida
- Music by: Hajime Mizoguchi
- Studio: Bones
- Licensed by: NA: Funimation; UK: Manga Entertainment
- Original network: Fuji TV (Noitamina)
- English network: US: Funimation Channel
- Original run: April 13, 2006 – June 22, 2006
- Episodes: 11

Jyu-Oh-Sei (Japanese: 獣王星, Hepburn: Jūōsei; lit. 'Planet of the Beast King') is a Japanese manga series written and illustrated by Natsumi Itsuki. The manga was first serialized in Hakusensha's monthly shōjo manga magazine LaLa in December 1993. Several chapters of the series were serialized in Hakusensha's other bi-monthly shōjo manga magazine Melody. The chapters released were then collected into five tankōbon volumes and later re-released into three kanzenban volumes. It was licensed and released in English in North America by Tokyopop, with translations by Yuya Otake and English adaptation by Clint Bickham.

An 11-episode anime adaptation was animated by Bones and premiered on April 13, 2006, in Japan as part of Fuji TV's Noitamina programming block. On May 2, 2009, the series made its North American television debut on the Funimation Channel.

The series deals with the adventures of twins Thor and Rai, who live on space colony Juno, a planet resembling Earth, until they are abandoned and sent to Chimaera, a secret planet dominated by extreme weather patterns which is used as a penal colony.

== Plot ==
Three hundred and fifty years have passed since humans first settled the Balkan star system, located approximately 150 light years from Earth, where a number of planets have been terraformed to resemble Earth. Two 11-year-old twins, Thor and Rai, live on the space colony Juno until they come home to find their parents have been murdered. The unknown assassins drop Thor and Rai on Chimaera, a secret planet used as a penal colony. Thor learns about Chimaeran society's four "Rings" and how to leave Chimaera by becoming the Beast King from Zagi, who rescued Thor and Rai after they immediately ran into trouble on the planet. Thor proceeds to the Ochre Ring where he gets swept up into that Ring's politics and winds up defeating its Top, bringing him closer to becoming the Beast King. After several years Thor faces off with Zagi who has violently taken over the Blanc ring and is determined to rule over and change Chimaeran society. Their encounter ends with an uneasy truce and a plan to force Juno to negotiate with Thor. When Thor finally meets Odin, the President of Juno, the mystery of Thor's and Chimaera's secret origins are revealed. Odin tells Thor he is a genetically engineered human created from the DNA of all the previous Beast Kings. His mother Eve was the lead researcher at the facility where he was created, and was a surrogate mother to him. Thor's genes adapt to survive under any circumstances, so they mimicked Eve's physical appearance. This is the reason Thor appeared to be Rai's twin. Odin also reveals no new children are being born in the colonies, and that Thor is humanity's last hope for survival. Finally, Odin reveals a long-kept secret: that Earth was destroyed by an asteroid collision long ago, and humanity cannot return there, so they must adapt to survive in the Balkan Star System. However, Odin's plans involve dissecting Thor in order to mass-produce more genetically engineered humans capable of surviving in Balkan, and terraforming Chimaera, which would kill the planet's current inhabitants. With the help of Third, Thor stops the terraforming process, though Third dies in the process. Thor returns to Chimaera to live with Chen, Zagi and the rest of the planet's inhabitants.

In the end, it is revealed that Thor's genes have adapted once again, causing him to take on Third's physical appearance. He and Chen appear to be together. He adopts an orphan girl they both found, naming her "Tiz", saying it means hope.

== Setting ==
=== Chimaera ===
A secret planet used as a penal colony where day and night last 181 days each and the planet is marked by extreme weather patterns. Plants dominate the planet's ecosystem. Their varied defensive adaptions, as well as carnivorous varieties, are a constant hazard to the people of Chimaera. The violent seasonal bloom of muses, where the plants erupt from deep below the surface to spread their canopies to the sun, is the main source of water for Chimerans; most of the water lies deep in the planet's crust. Sap from a calypto plant is highly useful, but harvesting it is dangerous. The calypto sap erupts from punctures and inhalation can cause death. Of all the plants a verasoma is the most ferocious and formidable, a mobile carnivorous plant. It usually attacks from underground keeping its small weak point well away from any threat. Even when mortally wounded its death throes are likely to kill anything around it.

=== Chimaeraian Society ===
The prisoners adopted a feudal society and divided into four groups of humans, called "Rings" that act as governs on the planet. These Rings, the Ochre Ring, Sun Ring, Blanc Ring, and Noire Ring, are based on skin color. A group of outcast children called Yado are led by Zagi with no affiliation to any ring. Each ring is led by three people: the Top, Second, and Third, with the Top as the leader. Hierarchy is maintained by winning any challenges to the position in a duel. If an individual successfully defeats the Top of all four rings they become the "Beast King" who gets to be pardoned for their crimes and allowed to reside on Hecate. Women make up only 20% of the population, they are considered extremely special, live apart from men, and are the ones who get to choose their partners during the "Mating Month", a chosen mate is generally not allowed to refuse.

== Characters ==
Thor (トール, Tōru)
Voiced by: Koichi Domoto (Japanese); Sean Michael Teague (English) (Adult)
Voiced by: Minami Takayama (Japanese); Alison Viktorin (English) (Child)
Thor, the main character of Jyu-Oh-Sei, was abandoned together with his twin brother, Rai, on Chimaera. He adapts quickly to Chimaera's environment and fights for his survival on the planet. After many near-death experiences, he learns more about Chimaera and the myth of the Beast King (Jyu Oh). Thor becomes the Top of Ochre Ring at the age of eleven, Tiz becomes his Second, and Third remains his third. He is known as the Silver Hawk for his silver hair but he hates the name. A Top, he improves the lives of those living in Ocher Ring, even creating an air conditioning system.
Four years after becoming Top, he meets a woman named Karin, who he immediately falls in love with after saving her life. She is killed by a man Thor assumes to be Zagi. He attacks and defeats Zagi, but does not kill him. Zagi tells him that he did not kill Karim. Before losing consciousness, he warns Thor not to trust Third. After becoming the Jyu Oh and riding the Dagger Pagoda orbital elevator he learns truth about why his parents were killed: they were killed because they were attached to Thor. Their orders had been to send him to Chimaera. Having failed, Odin had them killed and sent both Thor and Rai to Chimaera himself. It is then revealed that Thor is the first child to be born naturally since leaving the Earth. He also learns that his brother, Rai, is not related to him by any means. Thor has the ability to change his appearance due to his DNA. His DNA is special in a way that has allowed him to survive all these years. He was artificially engineered from the DNA of the previous 37 Jyu Ohs in order to create a new race of humans who could thrive on Chimaera. While trying to stop the accelerated terraforming of Chimaera (which would kill all the residents), he kills the previous Jyu Ohs before they can be revived to attack him.
Rai (ラーイ, Rāi)
Voiced by: Minami Takayama (Japanese); Alison Viktorin (English)
Rai is Thor's twin brother and was abandoned together with Thor at Chimaera. He is the weaker twin, and Thor must go to great lengths to protect him. Both Thor and Rai are noted for having blue-gray eyes and silver hair; Zagi finds this to be highly unusual, despite the colony's abilities of gene-manipulation. Rai dies early on when he is attacked by a verasona plant. Rai is actually not Thor's brother genetically.
Tiz (ティズ, Tizu)
Voiced by: Nana Mizuki (Japanese); Trina Nishimura (English)
Tiz was originally the Second of the Sun Ring's female clan. Immediately after meeting Thor, she takes a liking to him and tries to make him her mate, much to Thor's dismay. Tiz even left the Sun Ring shortly before Thor defeated Chen, just to be with him. Tiz is seen throughout the series trying to persuade Thor to have a child with her. She is heartbroken when Thor picks Karin over her and tells her that he thinks of her like "a little sister". After Karin's death, Thor decides that he will be the father of her child. Unfortunately, she dies in saving Zagi's life from a bullet shot by a Noire Ring survivor. At the end of the final episode, Chen is shown adopting a child that Thor names Tiz. He claims that it means "Hope".
Third (サード, Sādo)
Voiced by: Shun Oguri (Japanese); Duncan Brannan (English)
He is known only as 'Third' as he is the third in command of Ochre Ring, claiming that it has been so long since he was called by his original name that he can no longer remember it. He acts as a supporter of Thor when he declares that he intends to become the Beast King. He says that he cannot love Chen the way she wants because he is in love with another woman from Earth—this is most likely a lie. In the last few episodes, his true intentions surface: he was using Thor to complete a mission given to him by his commander so that he could go to Earth, but much to his dismay, on a mission to save Chimaera, he discovers that Earth had been destroyed 130 years ago. He commits suicide in order to force Thor into escaping from Hecate. His real name is revealed to be Heather Sigurd, near the end of the show.
Zagi (ザギ, Zagi)
Voiced by: Kazuya Nakai (Japanese); Eric Vale (English)
Zagi is introduced early in the series as he saves Thor and Rai from a dangerous situation. He is very pragmatic and encourages Thor to abandon his brother rather than protect him due to his weakness. He also becomes the Top of his ring at the same time Thor does. He actually had feelings for Karin but said nothing and only truly admitted it a day before she was killed. Tiz tells Zagi that he and Thor are truly good friends.
Karim (カリン, Karim)
Voiced by: Romi Park (Japanese); Jamie Marchi (English)
Karim is a very beautiful woman and acts as Blanc Ring's second in command. She appears later in the series but plays an important role. At first, she hates Thor for having all of Zagi's attention and even tries killing him at one point, but she quickly falls in love with him. She is in love with both Thor and Zagi, and she even says that she wants to bear both of their children. But before she could do so, she was killed by Third. She had tried to run after Zagi when he left, but in the end, she mistook Third for Zagi, seeing him wearing the same cloak. She called out Zagi's name letting Thor hear her voice, and that was when Third intentionally killed her.
Chen (チェン)
Voiced by: Rika Fukami (Japanese); Clarine Harp (English)
The leader of Sun Ring's clan. She is constantly hounded by Ochre Ring's leader to become his wife. Despite this, she is very enthusiastic and vocal about her love for his third in command, Third, placing both of them in danger. Further in the future, she gets into a fight to become top for the Sun Ring and wins. Due to serious injuries, however, she has to amputate her leg resulting in her losing her place as top. She did not want Third to see her in such a state, so she tried to keep away from him when he, Thor, and Tiz went to the Noire Ring. From then on she helps Thor, Third and Tiz in their adventures.

== Media ==
=== Manga ===
Three volumes of the manga have been released in tankōbon format on the following release dates:

==== Japanese ====
Volume	Release date
Volume 1	March 4, 2006
Volume 2	April 5, 2006
Volume 3	May 2, 2006

==== English ====
Volume	Release date
Volume 1	August 12, 2008
Volume 2	December 9, 2008
Volume 3	June 2, 2009

=== Anime ===
Jyu-Oh-Sei has been adapted into an anime which consists of 11 episodes, which began airing in Japan on April 13, 2006. The series has been licensed in North America by Funimation Entertainment.

==== Theme music ====
- Opening: "Deep in Your Heart" by Kōichi Dōmoto
- Ending: "Te o Tsunaide" (手をつないで) by Younha

==== Home media ====
The DVD release of "Jyu-Oh-Sei" began on July 28, 2006. The Japanese release was sold by Asmik Ace, consisting of a total of four volumes, with volumes including interviews with the original Japanese cast and cover artwork drawn by the character designer and director. The English release was managed by Funimation and consisted of a single complete edition.

===== Japanese =====
Volume	Episodes	Release date
Volume 1	1–3	July 28, 2006
Volume 2	4–6	August 25, 2006
Volume 3	7–9	September 22, 2006
Volume 4	10–11	October 27, 2006

===== English =====
Volume	Episodes	Release date
Complete Edition S.A.V.E	1–11	April 24, 2012

=== Episode list ===
No.	Title	Original release date
01	"Fate"; Transliteration: "Unmei" (Japanese: 運命)	April 13, 2006
The first episode describes Thor and Rai's arrival at Chimera.
02	"Ochre Ring"; Transliteration: "Charin" (Japanese: 茶輪)	April 20, 2006
An unconscious Thor is taken to Ochre Ring, and after waking up he finds out that he was saved by Tiz, a female member of the Sun Ring who chose him as her husband.
03	"Companion"; Transliteration: "Nakama" (Japanese: 仲間)	April 27, 2006
Thor and Tiz go in search of a wise man named Colin; meanwhile, the Top of Sun Ring, Chen, approaches Ochre Ring looking for Tiz.
04	"Challenge"; Transliteration: "Chōsen" (Japanese: 挑戦)	May 4, 2006
Thor asks Third to take him and Tiz to see Colin. There he figures out who could be responsible for their parents' death, and has a shocking revelation about his future.
05	"Duel"; Transliteration: "Kettō" (Japanese: 決闘)	May 11, 2006
Thor was set up by Third, and unintentionally challenges Top to a try, a life-or-death battle to decide Ochre Ring's true leader.
06	"White Wolf Demon"; Transliteration: "Buran Rō" (Japanese: 白狼鬼)	May 18, 2006
Four years after Thor became Ochre Ring's Top, he must face the threat of the Blanc Ring leader, who turns out to be Zagi, the one who protected the Klein brothers when they were first sent to Chimera.
07	"Independence"; Transliteration: "Dokuritsu" (Japanese: 独立)	May 25, 2006
Zagi tells Thor that the myth of the Beast King is a lie. He proposes that they should join together to wage a war of independence.
08	"Depths"; Transliteration: "Shinsō" (Japanese: 深層)	June 1, 2006
Karim and Thor were trapped in a cave during a blizzard. She initially attacks him, angry that Zagi chose him as his new partner over her. Thor, however, finds that he has feelings for her and she begins to respond to his refusal to fight her or leave her there.
09	"Beast King"; Transliteration: "Jūō" (Japanese: 獣王)	June 8, 2006
Thor and Zagi prepare themselves to set for Hecate, in order to continue their plan. However, Karim is murdered in an alley. Thor, believing Zagi killed her because he heard her calling Zagi's name just before she died, challenges Zagi. He eventually defeats Zagi, badly wounding him. Before falling unconscious, Zagi tells Thor that he did not kill Karim and warns him to watch out for "that one." After Chen promises to treat Zagi's wounds, Thor goes to kiss Karim's body goodbye, then leaves for the Dagger Pagoda with Tiz and Third.
10	"Nightmare"; Transliteration: "Akumu" (Japanese: 悪夢)	June 15, 2006
As the new Beast King, Thor is granted access to the Dagger Pagoda, the orbital elevator, and is finally able to leave the planet. The last words of Zagi are tormenting Thor with inexpressible anxiety. Arriving at the space port, Thor is greeted by none other than Odin, the one who murdered his parents. He tells him the real reason for exiling Thor on Chimera.
11	"Hope"; Transliteration: "Kibō" (Japanese: 希望)	June 22, 2006
Odin decides to proceed with his own plan by activating the device resulting in acceleration of the planet's rotation and the destruction of human life. Thor is heading to the "Valkyrie", the computer control system, in an attempt to deactivate the device.
