= Hajime Mizoguchi =

Hajime Mizoguchi 溝口 肇
- Born: April 23, 1960 (age 66); Tokyo, Japan
- Genre: New age
- Occupations: Cellist, composer, arranger, producer
- Instrument: Cello
- Years active: 1986–present
- Website: archcello.com

Hajime Mizoguchi (溝口 肇, Mizoguchi Hajime; born April 23, 1960 in Tokyo) is a Japanese cellist and composer.

Mizoguchi started playing piano at the age of 3, and the cello at the age of 11. From 1978–1985 he attended the Tokyo National University of Fine Arts and Music where he majored in violoncello.

In 1986, he released his first album, Half Inch Dessert, being listed as a composer, arranger, and performer. From then on, he has released over 20 albums including motion picture soundtracks.

== Career ==
Mizoguchi is noted for his compositions for animation, namely, the soundtrack to the animated feature film Jin-Roh: The Wolf Brigade and a collaboration with Yoko Kanno on the animated series The Vision of Escaflowne and its subsequent film, Escaflowne. He also collaborated with Keishi Urata on the animated series Texhnolyze. In 2006, he composed the music for Tokimeki Memorial Only Love (along with Teruyuki Nobuchika) Jyu Oh Sei and the Fuji TV noitamina series . He composed and performed the opening and ending themes for TV Asahi's series See the World by Train, which has been airing since June 1987. His song 'Bruce', from the 1986 album Oasis Behind the Clear Water, appears in various scenes of the 1987 animated film To-y.

== Anime Soundtrack Contributions ==
Anime title	Year	Mizoguchi's role(s)	Reference
Wonder Beat Scramble	1986	Composer (other tracks by Ryō Yonemitsu)	
Please Save My Earth	1994	Composer (other tracks by Yoko Kanno)	
Dirty Pair Flash: Mission II	1995	Composer (other tracks by Jun'ichi Kanezaki)	
The Vision of Escaflowne	1996	Composer (other tracks by Yoko Kanno)	
Eight Clouds Rising	1997	Composer	
Jin-Roh	1999	Composer	
Escaflowne	2000	Composer (other tracks by Yoko Kanno)	
Texhnolyze	2003	Composer (other tracks by Keishi Urata)	
Jyu-Oh-Sei	2006	Composer	
Tokimeki Memorial Only Love	2006	Composer (other tracks by Teruyuki Nobuchika)	
