= Eight Clouds Rising =

Manga series

八雲立つ (Yakumo Tatsu)
- Manga
- Written by: Natsumi Itsuki
- Published by: Hakusensha
- Magazine: LaLa
- Original run: October 19, 1992 – November 5, 2002
- Volumes: 19
- Original video animation
- Directed by: Tomomi Mochizuki
- Written by: Tomomi Mochizuki
- Music by: Hajime Mizoguchi
- Studio: Bandai Visual, Studio Pierrot
- Licensed by: NA: Media Blasters
- Released: October 25, 1997 – November 25, 1997
- Episodes: 2
- Manga

Yakumo Tatsu: Arata
- Written by: Natsumi Itsuki
- Published by: Hakusensha
- Magazine: Melody
- Original run: February 28, 2018 – present
- Volumes: 11

Eight Clouds Rising (Japanese: 八雲立つ, Hepburn: Yakumo Tatsu) is a Japanese shōjo manga series by Natsumi Itsuki. It won the 21st Kodansha Manga Award for shōjo. It was adapted in 1997 into an OVA series.

== Plot summary ==
Kuraki Fuzuchi is a handsome and quiet young man who has immense psychic powers and sword skills. He meets Takeo Nanachi, a college student with similar powers.

The story opens with Nanachi traveling to a small shrine in the mountains to purify his deceased grandfather's sword in a festival that only occurs every 49 years. There he meets Kuraki and later accidentally stumbles upon Kuraki's initiation ritual as a Shaman. From there on, their lives are inexplicitly intertwined as they encounter ghosts, spirits, demons, and other characters with supernatural powers while the author provides a parallel running story depicting their previous life.

== Seven Sacred Swords ==
In the ancient Izumo era, the seven sacred swords were forged by the blacksmith Tsukamoto Tomohiko for the priest Manashi. For a long time, they protected the barrier that sealed away the grudge of Susanoo in Ikuya, but during the war, all of them were stolen except for Kagutsuchi. However, the train they were on was hit by an air raid in Osaka and torn apart.

- Kagutsuchi (Kagutsuchi)
- Midzuchi (Midzuchi)
- Takemikazuchi (Takemikazuchi)
- Yamatsumi (Yamatoyamatsumi)
- Awanami (Awanami)
- Sazuchi (Sadzuchi)
- Kusanagi (Kusanagi) = Ame-no-Murakumo-no-Tsurugi

== Media ==
=== Original series ===
Written and illustrated by Natsumi Itsuki, Eight Clouds Rising serialized in Hakusesha's Lala magazine from October 19, 1992, until November 5, 2002. The entire series was compiled in 19 tankōbon volumes by Hakusnesha.

No.	Japanese release date	Japanese ISBN
1	October 19, 1992	4-592-12120-1
2	July 5, 1995	4-592-12477-4
3	December 5, 1995	4-592-12478-2
4	April 5, 1996	4-592-12479-0
5	August 5, 1996	4-592-12480-4
6	January 7, 1997	4-592-12481-2
7	July 5, 1997	4-592-12482-0
8	November 5, 1997	4-592-12483-9
9	May 1, 1998	4-592-12484-7
10	October 5, 1998	4-592-12485-5
11	April 5, 1999	4-592-12486-3
12	August 5, 1999	4-592-17432-1
13	February 4, 2000	4-592-17433-X
14	December 5, 2000	4-592-17434-8
15	May 2, 2001	4-592-17435-6
16	November 5, 2001	4-592-17436-4
17	April 5, 2002	4-592-17437-2
18	July 5, 2002	4-592-17438-0
19	November 5, 2002	4-592-17439-9

==== Bunko release ====
No.	Japanese release date	Japanese ISBN
1	July 15, 2008	978-4-592-88801-7
2	July 15, 2008	978-4-592-88802-4
3	September 12, 2008	978-4-592-88803-1
4	September 12, 2008	978-4-592-88804-8
5	November 14, 2008	978-4-592-88805-5
6	November 14, 2008	978-4-592-88806-2
7	January 14, 2009	978-4-592-88807-9
8	January 14, 2009	978-4-592-88808-6
9	March 13, 2009	978-4-592-88809-3
10	March 13, 2009	978-4-592-88810-9

==== Collector's Edition ====
No.	Japanese release date	Japanese ISBN
1	February 28, 2018	978-4-592-21251-5
2	February 28, 2018	978-4-592-21252-2
3	March 28, 2018	978-4-592-21253-9
4	March 28, 2018	978-4-592-21254-6
5	April 27, 2018	978-4-592-21255-3
6	April 27, 2018	978-4-592-21256-0
7	May 28, 2018	978-4-592-21257-7
8	May 28, 2018	978-4-592-21258-4
9	June 28, 2018	978-4-592-21259-1
10	July 27, 2018	978-4-592-21260-7
11	August 28, 2018	978-4-592-21261-4

=== Yakumo Tatsu: Arata ===
Yakumo Tatsu: Arata (八雲立つ 灼; "Eight Clouds Rising: Burning") is a sequel to the original series that began serialisation on February 28, 2018, in Melody. It has 11 volumes published (as of September 5, 2025).

No.	Japanese release date	Japanese ISBN
1	August 28, 2018	978-4-592-21891-3
2	May 2, 2019	978-4-592-21892-0
3	December 5, 2019	978-4-592-21893-7
4	October 5, 2020	978-4-592-21894-4
5	August 5, 2021	978-4-592-21895-1
6	April 5, 2022	978-4-592-22246-0
7	January 4, 2023	978-4-592-22247-7
8	October 5, 2023	978-4-592-22248-4
9	May 2, 2024	978-4-592-22249-1
10	January 4, 2025	978-4-592-22250-7
11	September 5, 2025	978-4-592-22286-6
12	June 5, 2026	978-4-592-22287-3

=== OVA ===
The Yakumo Tatsu OVA is composed of two volumes. It is licensed in North America by Media Blasters. The English DVD was released on August 17, 2004.

=== Cast ===
- Kitano Senpai - Fujiwara Keiji
- Toda Chinatsu - Watanabe Misa
- Nushii Wakakuni - Akimoto Yosuke
- Assistant - Hyoudou Mako

=== Staff ===
- Original story - Itsuki Natsumi
- Director, storyboard, direction - Mochizuki Tomomitsu
- Screenplay - Sakamoto Go
- Character design, animation director - Kusumoto Yuko
- Art director - Kaneko Hidetoshi
- Color design - Itose Miyoko
- Director of photography - Watanabe Hidetoshi
- Editing - Morita Seiji
- Sound director - Kikuta Hiromi
- Music - Mizoguchi Hajime
- Producer - Kanno Chizuko, Suzuki Shigehiro, Inoue Shunji
- Produced by Studio Pierrot
- Produced by Bandai Visual, Studio Pierrot, Airs

=== Theme song ===
"Harukanaru Wailing" (Volume 1)
Lyrics by Takubo Mami / Music by Hamada Kingo / Arrangement by Sudo Kenichi / Singer by Ishizuka Saori
"Pinparipon" (Volume 2; OP)
Lyrics and music by GONGON, complete arrangement by B-DASH
"Goemon" (Volume 2; ED)
Lyrics and music by GONGON, complete arrangement by B-DASH

=== Soundtrack ===
- "Yakumo Tatsu OVA Original Soundtrack" (Bandai Music, released November 21, 1997) AYCM-586

=== Drama CD ===
Shin Onban Monogatari 2 volumes, Onban Monogatari 5 volumes. Published by Airs/Bandai Music Entertainment, insert songs are "a myth~shinwa~" and "Eien ga" (sung by Ishizuka Saori).

=== New Record Story Volume 1: The Black Impure Village: Ancient Chapter: The Divine Question (Part 1) ===
~The Black Impure Village~
- Other cast: Nobuo - Yoshida Takashi, Nagamatsu - Suzuki Takuma, Yoshie - Kodama Takako, Girl A - Sakuma Beni, Girl B - Kurata Masayo, Driver - Nagasawa Takashi, Susumu - Suzuki Takuma, Shiori's mother - Kodama Takako
~Ancient Chapter
The Divine Question (Part 1)~
- Other cast: Ichimaro - Nagasawa Takashi

=== New Record Story Volume 2: The Amanojaku Comes: Ancient Chapter: The Divine Question (Part 2) ===
~The Amanojaku Comes~
- Other cast: Takajo Chikuyo - Morikubo Shoutaro, High school girl A - Asakawa Yuu, High school girl B - Kitajima Chieko, High school girl C - Kotani Nobuko, Entertainment agency president - Takatsuka Masaya, Driver - Tobe Kouji
~Ancient Chapter
Questions to the Gods (Part 2)~
- Other cast: Ichimaro - Nagasawa Takashi, Susa woman - Imai Yuka, Susa people A - Hachinohe Yuu, Susa people B - Tobe Kouji, Susa people C - Takatsuka Masaya, Chief A - Takatsuka Masaya, Chief B - Nakamura Toshihiro, Chief C - Egawa Daisuke, Susa chief - Tobe Kouji, Tokoshironushi - Nagasawa Takashi, Saniwa - Hachinohe Yu

=== Onban Monogatari Volume 1 ===
- Other cast: Kitano Senpai - Fujiwara Keiji, Toda Chinatsu - Watanabe Misa, Yamiki's uncle - Akimoto Yosuke, Nanachi's father - Sugawara Junichi, Nanachi's mother - Hyoudou Mako

=== Onban Monogatari Volume 2 Wakamiya Festival ===
- Other cast: Nanachi's mother - Hyoudou Mako, Yamiki's uncle - Akimoto Yosuke, Yamiki's aunt - Ezawa Masako, Wakamiya's thoughts - Hirose Masashi

=== Onban Monogatari Volume 3 Demon's Cry Crossroads, Kirabi (Ancient Edition) ===
~The Crossroads of Demon's Cry~
- Other cast: Nanachi Kunio - Namikawa Daisuke, Goto Norihiko - Nakahara Shigeru, Miyo (the proprietress of Amatsuji) - Komiya Kazue, Sayoko - Amano Yuri
~Kirabi (Ancient Version)~
- Mikachihiko - Namikawa Daisuke, Manashi - Sakurai Tomo, Zenzo - Shimakahiro, Judgement - Bando Naoki

=== Onban Monogatari Volume 4 One-Eyed Inari and the Seven Forerunners ===
~One-Eyed Inari~
- Other cast: Tomioka Seiko - Shinohara Emi, Aunt - Tani Ikuko
~The Seven Forerunners~
- Other cast: Richa - Yoko Asada, Harumi - Akemi Okamura, Taki - Konami Yoshida, Mr. Hara - Takuma Suzuki, Delinquent (extra edition) - Eiji Sekiguchi, Delinquent (extra edition) - Hiroyuki Yokoo

=== Onban Monogatari Volume 5: The Love of Princess Kinutsu ===
- Other cast: Mother of Nanachi - Mako Hyodo
