= The Vision of Escaflowne =

Japanese anime television series

- 天空のエスカフローネ
- Genre: Fantasy, isekai, mecha
- Created by: Hajime Yatate; Shōji Kawamori
- Developed by: Shōji Kawamori
- Directed by: Kazuki Akane
- Music by: Hajime Mizoguchi; Yoko Kanno
- Opening theme: "Yakusoku wa Iranai" by Maaya Sakamoto
- Ending theme: "Mystic Eyes" by Hiroki Wada
- Country of origin: Japan
- Original language: Japanese
- No. of episodes: 26 (list of episodes)

Production
- Producers: Yumi Murase (TV Tokyo); Masahiko Minami (Sunrise)
- Production companies: TV Tokyo; Sunrise

Original release
- Network: TXN (TV Tokyo)
- Release: April 2 – September 24, 1996

Related
- Manga
- Written by: Shōji Kawamori
- Illustrated by: Katsu Aki
- Published by: Kadokawa Shoten
- English publisher: AUS: Madman Entertainment; NA: Tokyopop
- Magazine: Shōnen Ace
- Original run: October 24, 1994 – November 26, 1997
- Volumes: 8
- Manga

Messiah Knight: The Vision of Escaflowne
- Written by: Yuzuru Yashiro
- Published by: Kadokawa Shoten
- Magazine: Asuka Fantasy DX
- Original run: April 18, 1996 – January 18, 1997
- Volumes: 2
- Light novel
- Written by: Yumiko Tsukamoto
- Illustrated by: Nobuteru Yūki; Hirotoshi Sano
- Published by: Kadokawa Shoten
- Magazine: Newtype
- Original run: June 1996 – August 1997
- Volumes: 6
- Manga

Escaflowne: Energist's Memories
- Written by: Various
- Published by: Kadokawa Shoten
- Published: January 8, 1997
- Volumes: 1
- Anime film
- Escaflowne (2000)

The Vision of Escaflowne (Japanese: 天空のエスカフローネ, Hepburn: Tenkū no Esukafurōne; lit. Escaflowne of the Heavens) is a Japanese anime television series created by Shōji Kawamori and produced by Sunrise. It aired on TV Tokyo from April to September 1996. It was licensed for Region 1 release by Bandai Entertainment.

The series follows a high school girl named Hitomi, who finds herself pulled from Earth to the planet Gaea when a boy named Van appears on the high school track while battling a dragon. In Gaea, she is caught in the middle of a war as the Zaibach Empire attempts to take over Gaea. Van (King of Fanelia), with aid from Allen (an Asturian Knight), commands his mystical mech Escaflowne in the struggle to stop the Zaibach Empire. Hitomi's fortune telling powers blossom in Gaea as she becomes the key to awakening Escaflowne and fighting Zaibach.

While the anime series was in production, two very different manga series retellings were also developed and released: a version of the story entitled The Vision of Escaflowne and a retelling titled Hitomi—The Vision of Escaflowne. In addition, a third manga adaptation called Escaflowne—Energist's Memories was released as a single volume in 1997. The story was novelized in a series of six light novels by Yumiko Tsukamoto. An anime film, entitled simply Escaflowne, was released in June 2000. Four CD soundtracks and a drama CD have also been released in relation to the series.

== Plot ==
Gaea is an alternate world that was created from the combined wishes of the inhabitants of Atlantis when it started to sink into the ocean. On Gaea, Earth is known as the Mystic Moon. Gaea's size, mass, atmospheric composition, temperature belts, and even seasons are the same as Earth's. The series focuses on Hitomi Kanzaki and her adventures after she is transported to the world of Gaea, a mysterious planet where she can see Earth and its moon in the sky. Hitomi's latent psychic powers are enhanced on Gaea and she quickly becomes embroiled in the conflicts between the Zaibach Empire led by Emperor Isaac Dornkirk and the several peaceful countries that surround it. The conflicts are brought about by the Zaibach Empire's quest to revive the legendary power from the ancient city of Atlantis. As the series progresses, many of the characters' pasts and motivations, as well as the history of Atlantis and the true nature of the planet Gaea, are revealed.

== Production ==
Shoji Kawamori first proposed the series after a trip to Nepal, during which he visited the foggy mountain region and pictured a hidden world where an epic focusing on both fate and destiny should be set. When he returned, he proposed the series to Bandai Visual and Sunrise. According to Kawamori, his pitch for the series was simple: "if Macross was robotic mecha and love songs, why not a story about robotic mecha and divining powers?" He worked with Bandai producer Minoru Takanashi to finish fleshing out the original idea. They researched various mysteries for inspiration, particularly stories centered on the mythical land of Atlantis and the Bermuda Triangle. As the series began taking shape, they changed the lead character from a male, to a high school girl as the lead character. Nobuteru Yuki was hired as the character designer, and tasked with crafting a design for Hitomi and the rest of the cast. He would later state that Hitomi was his favorite character because it was the first one he would ever design completely from scratch rather than simply being adapted from an existing medium. Initially, Folken and Dilandau were a single enemy commander, but as the story was fleshed out, the creators felt the series would be more interesting if there were two with very different personalities.

Initially, Yasuhiro Imagawa was brought on board to direct. He is credited with coining the word "escaflowne", a Latin-based derivative of the word "escalation", that would be used in the title. Imagawa imagined a series that was heavily male-oriented and would feature a shapely heroine and dramatic battles. However, he left the project before production started to direct Mobile Fighter G Gundam. Without a director, the series was put on hold and Kawamori left to work on other projects. After two years, Sunrise revisited the project and brought in relative newcomer Kazuki Akane as the new director. To broaden the potential audience, Akane decided to add more girl-oriented elements to the series. The suggestive elements were removed, several of the male characters were given more "beautiful boy" appearances, and the plot element around the tarot cards were added. Akane also redesigned Hitomi, taking her from a curvy, air-headed, long-haired girl with glasses to a slim, athletic, short-haired and more intelligent and confident girl. With the series character designs finalized and the story set, Yoko Kanno was selected to write the songs for the series, including the background songs which she co-wrote with her then-husband Hajime Mizoguchi, with whom she had previously collaborated on the soundtrack for Please Save My Earth. Initially they found it difficult to score the series as the plot itself was still being reworked around the new concept, but the plot changes were finished in time for them to prepare the score and give the film the desired final "epic touch." 16-year-old Maaya Sakamoto, fresh from a small role in the anime adaptation of Mizuiro Jidai, was selected not only as the voice of Hitomi, but also to sing the Escaflowne theme song. Kanno is noted as saying that Sakamoto is an ideal interpreter of her work. After this project, they continued to collaborate on many other works and some consider her work on The Vision of Escaflowne to be the launching point of Sakamoto's career.

It is said as the series entered into production, the budget required it be cut down to twenty-six episodes before work began on the final scripts and the animation. However the director disputes this in a panel Q&A for Funimation's Kickstarter, where he states the series was always supposed to be 26 episodes. This is clarified by Shoji Kawamori in the Special Edition Booklet for Escaflowne, in which he states the original pitch was 39 episodes in 1990, but this version never went into production, and it was also radically different in concept and tone. The production really began in 1994 where the show solidified its fantasy aspects and the final format. In an interview during this time Kawamori had said he was unsure what form Escaflowne would take, but eventually it was set on a 26 episode TV anime. In the retail Japanese video release, some of the extended scenes were restored to the first seven episodes.

== Media ==
=== Anime ===
The Vision of Escaflowne premiered in Japan on TV Tokyo on April 2, 1996, where it aired weekly until it completed its twenty-six-episode run on September 24, 1996. Bandai Visual released the series in 7 VHS volumes from 1996 to 1997. Bandai Visual also released the series on DVD as a single set in 2000 and on multiple DVD volumes in 2001. The series was also released on Blu-ray starting in 2012.

Bandai Entertainment, which licensed the series for home video distribution under its AnimeVillage label, first released the series with English subtitles, across eight VHS volumes, including a box set, from September 15 to December 15, 1998. In August 2000, Fox Kids began broadcasting the series in the United States. Produced by Ocean Productions under license by Bandai Entertainment, these dubbed episodes were heavily edited to remove footage, add new "flashback" sequences to remind the audience of the events that just occurred, and to heavily downplay the role of Hitomi in the series. The first episode was skipped altogether, and the series soundtrack produced by Yoko Kanno was partially replaced with more techno rearrangements by Inon Zur. This modified version of the series was canceled after ten episodes due to "low ratings". Fox explained that they edited to meet their own target audience, to comply with broadcast standards, and to fit the allowed timeslot. The Canadian television channel YTV acquired Fox's dubbed version of the series for broadcast. Following Fox's planned broadcast schedule, they premiered the series on September 11, 2000, with the second episode. YTV aired all of the episodes Fox Kids dubbed, concluding with the series true first episode in February 2001. Bandai began releasing the dubbed version to VHS in 2000, discontinuing the releases in February 2001 after only four volumes had been released.

Bandai later released the entire series, unedited and in the original episode order, to Region 1 DVD. Spanning eight volumes, the releases include the original Japanese audio tracks with optional English subtitles, and the uncut English dubbed track. Bandai also later released the series in several different box sets, including a Limited Edition set released on July 23, 2002, a "Perfect Collection"—which included the Escaflowne feature-length movie—released October 26, 2004, and an "Anime Legends" box set on April 11, 2006. At Otakon 2013, Funimation (later Crunchyroll, LLC) had announced that they have acquired both licenses to The Vision of Escaflowne and the movie for North America. On February 27, 2016, Funimation launched a Kickstarter campaign to re-dub the Escaflowne TV series using the HD materials from Sunrise, with the goal of $150,000, with it raising over the goal at $318,784. Three pieces of theme music are used for the series. "No Need for Promises" (約束はいらない, Yakusoku wa Iranai), performed by Maaya Sakamoto, is used for the series opening theme for the entire series, except the first episode in which no opening sequence is used. Performed by Hiroki Wada, "Mystic Eyes" is used for the ending theme for the first twenty-five episodes, while the final episode uses Yoko Kanno's instrumental piece "The Story of Escaflowne ~ End Title" (ザ ストーリー オブ エスカフローネ~エンド タイトル, Za Sutoorii Obu Esukafuroone ~ Endo Taitoru). In the United Kingdom and Ireland, the series was made available in its Funimation dub on Channel 4 via All 4. From November 2022 to January 2024, the series streamed on ITV Hub, along with its successor platform, ITVX.

A Blu-ray box set containing all 26 episodes of the television anime and the theatrical film was released in Japan by Emotion on March 25, 2026, to mark the thirtieth anniversary of the TV anime's broadcast and the twenty-fifth anniversary of the film's theatrical release. The outer box will feature a newly drawn illustration by Kimitoshi Yamane. Additionally, the theatrical film received revival screenings via Bandai Namco Filmworks starting on March 20, 2026, in Japan.

=== Soundtracks ===
Maaya Sakamoto voiced the main character of Hitomi Kanzaki and performed the opening theme song "Yakusoku wa Iranai" and other songs from the series. Yoko Kanno and Hajime Mizoguchi composed and produced the series' musical themes and background, incorporating a variety of styles including contemporary, classical, and Gregorian chant. Four CD soundtracks have been released in Japan by Victor Entertainment. Escaflowne: Over the Sky was released on June 5, 1996, with sixteen tracks, including the series' full opening and ending themes. The second CD, Escaflowne Original Soundtrack 2, was released on July 24, 1996, and contained an additional seventeen tracks.

Released on September 28, 1996, Escaflowne Original Soundtrack 3 contained an additional fifteen tracks. The fourth CD soundtrack, The Vision of Escaflowne: Lovers Only, was released in on January 22, 1997, and contained twenty tracks, including the original TV length opening and ending themes and the ending theme used for the final episode of the series. Despite the relative popularity of the soundtracks, they were not licensed for release outside Japan for some time and were only available by importing them. However, all 4 soundtracks can now be currently purchased digitally via iTunes.

=== Manga ===
Three alternate retellings of The Vision of Escaflowne have been released in manga form, with first two manga series developed at the same time as the anime. Due to the radical changes in the anime series during production, these two manga series are very different from the original anime series and each other. The first series, also titled The Vision of Escaflowne was one of the first manga series to appear in the then new Shōnen Ace magazine from Kadokawa Shoten. Despite the anime series itself being on hold, Sunrise gave artist Katsu Aki the existing production and character designs, resulting in the first series having the heavy manga feel and curvaceous Hitomi that was originally planned for the anime series. Given free rein to change the story however he wanted, Aki's version is a violent saga focused primarily on fighting and has Hitomi transforming into a "curvaceous nymph" that is the power source of the mecha Escaflowne. The series premiered in Shōnen Ace's first issue on October 24, 1994, and ran until November 26, 1997. The thirty-four chapters were collected and published by Kadokawa across eight tankōbon volumes. It was licensed for released in North America by Tokyopop with the first volume released on July 8, 2003. The Tokyopop English editions were also imported for distribution in Australia by Madman Entertainment.

No.	Original release date	Original ISBN	English release date	English ISBN
1	March 28, 1995	978-4-04-713104-0	July 8, 2003	1-59182-366-8
"Vision 1: Of Dreams and Legends" (聖宝石パワー発現!!, Hijiri hōseki pawā hatsugen!!); "Vision 2: Dilandau" (冷徹！ディランドー, Reitetsu! Dirandō); "Vision 3: Battle in Asturia" (激突！古城基地の闘い!!, Gekitotsu kojō kichi no tatakai!!); "Vision 4: Rah Drick, Demon of the Heavenly Mountains" (天上山脈の悪魔, Tenjō sanmyaku no akuma)
2	November 28, 1995	978-4-04-713123-1	September 9, 2003	1-59182-367-6
"Vision 5: Secrets of the Holy Spring" (聖なる湖の神話, Seinaru mizuumi no shinwa); "Vision 6: Trial by Fire" (激闘！バァンVS炎の騎士!!, Gekitō！ Bān VS Hono no kishi!!); "Vision 7: Familiar Faces" (奪われた紋章, Ubawareta monshō!); "Vision 8: Single Passage" (たったひとつの突破口, Tatta hitotsu no toppakō); "Vision 9: Zaibach Infiltration" (ザイバッハ侵入作戦, Zaibahha shinnyū sakusen)
3	April 1, 1996	978-4-04-713137-8	November 4, 2003	1-59182-368-4
"Vision 10: Conspiracy" (ゲルグラン元帥の陰謀!!, Geruguran gensui no inbō!!); "Vision 11: Death to the Queen" (処刑!! エスカリーナ王妃, Shokei!! Esukarīna ōhi); "Vision 12: Identity of the Flame" (炎の騎士の正体, Honō no kishi no shōtai); "Vision 13: Emperor Dornkirk" (帝王ドルンカーク, Teiō Dorunkāku); "Vision 14: The Forest of Deception" (まやかしの森の悲劇, Mayakashi no mori no higeki)
4	July 29, 1996	978-4-04-713147-7	January 6, 2004	1-59182-449-4
"Vision 15: Knights of Gold and Silver" (金の騎士・銀の騎士, Kin no kishi gin no kishi); "Vision 16: Final Farewell" (最後のメッセージ, Saigo no messēji); "Vision 17: A Desperate Prayer" (命がけの祈り！, Nochigake no inori!); "Vision 18: Battle of the Mine" (第2採掘場の死闘!!, Dai 2 saikutsuba no shitō!!)
5	November 27, 1996	978-4-04-713169-9	March 2, 2004	1-59182-450-8
"Vision 19: Suicide Bombing" (脅威 !! ゾンギ自爆計画, Kyōi!! Zongi Jjibaku Keikaku); "Vision 20: Millerna's Choice" (ラーナの真実, Rāna No Shinjitsu); 'Vision 21: Renegade?!" (逆賊アレン!?, Gyakuzoku Aren!?); "Vision 22: The Revolutionist's Army" (反帝国軍を探せ。, Han teikokugun o sagase.)
6	April 25, 1997	978-4-04-713181-1	May 11, 2004	1-59182-451-6
"Vision 23: Into the Storm" (豪雨の対決!!, Gōu no taiketsu!!); "Vision 24: Riot in Freid" (動乱！フレイド公国!!, Dōran! Furei do kōkoku!!); "Vision 25: The Legend of the Light" (光の神話, Hikari no shinwa); "Vision 26: Vision of Fate" (運命のビジョン!!, Unmei no bijon!!)
7	September 1, 1997	978-4-04-713195-8	July 6, 2004	1-59182-452-4
"Vision 27: Espionage" (スパイ潜入, Supai Sen'nyū); "Vision 28: Unto the Ark" (箱船が運びし者, Hakobune ga hakobishi mono); "Vision 29: Abandoned Paradise" (棄てられた楽園, Sute rareta rakuen); "Vision 30: The Demon Awakes" (目覚めた邪神!!, Mezameta jashin!!); "Vision 31: Mystery of the Lost Empire" (消えた帝国の謎!!, Kieta teikoku no nazo!!)
8	January 28, 1998	978-4-04-713208-5	September 14, 2004	1-59182-453-2
"Vision 32: Invading the Ark" (「箱船」発動 !!, "Hakobune" hatsudō!!); "Vision 33: Emergence of the First Commander" (第1指揮官出現!!, Dai 1 Shikikan Shutsugen!!); "Final Vision: Dreams of a World" (星の見る夢, Hoshi no miru yume)

In 1996, with the premiere of the anime series, Messiah Knight—The Vision of Escaflowne was created. This shōjo oriented adaptation was written by Yuzuru Yashiro and serialized in Asuka Fantasy DX from April 8, 1996, through January 18, 1997. Unlike the first manga, it focused more on the interaction of the characters and severely toned down the violence to the point that the mecha are not used for battle at all and Escaflowne only appears near the end of the series. It was abruptly canceled after only 10 chapters and the end of the anime, due to the slowing popularity of the series. The individual chapters were released in two tankōbon volumes, at which time the series was retitled Hitomi—The Vision of Escaflowne.

No.	Release date	ISBN
1	September 27, 1996	978-4-04-852739-2
"Prologue" (プロローグ, Purorōgu): 1. "The Price of the Wound" (傷の代償, Kizu no daishō); 2. "White Demon" (白き魔人, Shiroki majin); 3. "The Day When the Angel Dances" (天使の舞う日, Tenshi no mau hi); 4. "The Smell of Battle" (戦いの匂い, Tatakai no nioi); 5. "Storm Raider" (嵐の襲撃者, Arashi no shūgekisha)
2	April 7, 1997	978-4-04-852799-6
6. "Scarlet Demon Boy' (緋の魔少年, Hi no ma shōnen); 7. "The Sprouting Bond' (芽生えた絆, Mebaeta kizuna); 8. "Destiny Reunion' (運命の再会, Unmei no saikai); 9. "Burning Earth' (灼熱の大地, Shakunetsu no daichi); 10. "Eternal Feelings" (永遠の想い, Eien no omoi); 'Epilogue' (エピローグ, Epirōgu)

A final manga retelling, Escaflowne—Energist's Memories, was a collaborative effort of various manga artists around Japan to create 15 "mini-stories" related to the anime series. The single volume manga was published in January 1997 under Kadokawa's Asuka comics DX imprint. Artists who contributed to the volume include: Tammy Ohta, Yayoi Takeda, Kahiro Okuya, Daimoon Tennyo, Kazumi Takahashi, Masaki Sano, and Kyo Watanabe.

=== Novels ===
Yumiko Tsukamoto and Shoji Kawamori collaborated in the writing on a novelization of the Vision of Escaflowne anime series. The light novel chapters were originally serialized in Newtype, and the illustrations were provided by Nobuteru Yuuki and Hirotoshi Sano. The individual chapters were collected and released in six individual volumes by Kadokawa under their "New Type Novels" label between June 1996 and August 1997.

No.	Release date	ISBN
1	June 1996	4-04-701603-9
Volume title: Escaflowne; Cover characters: Hitomi Kanzaki, Van Fanel, Allen Schezar, Susumu Amano
2	August 1996	4-04-701604-7
Volume title: The Dragon's Wanderings (竜の流離, Ryū no Sasurai); Cover characters: Van Fanel, Hitomi Kanzaki, Allen Schezar
3	November 1996	4-04-701609-8
Volume title: The Dragon's Training (竜の修練, Ryū no Shūren); Cover characters: Allen Schezar, The Doppelganger, Dilandau Albatou, Hitomi Kanzaki, Prince Chid
4	April 1997	4-04-701610-1
Volume title: The Dragon's Silence (竜の沈黙, Ryū no Chinmoku); Cover characters: Millerna Aston, Allen Schezar, Dryden Fassa, Van Fanel, Hitomi Kanzaki
5	May 1997	4-04-701613-6
Volume title: The Dragon's Preference (竜の愛憎, Ryū no Aizō); Cover characters: Eriya, Folken Fanel, Nariya, Van Fanel, Hitomi Kanzaki
6	August 1997	4-04-701617-9
Volume title: The Dragon's Eternity (竜の永遠, Ryū no Eien); Cover characters: Van Fanel, Hitomi Kanzaki, Escaflowne

=== Anime film ===
Escaflowne (エスカフローネ, Esukafurōne) is an anime film released in Japan on June 24, 2000, that retells the story of the anime series. The film was produced by Sunrise, animated by Studio BONES, and directed by Kazuki Akane. Featuring character re-designs by Nobuteru Yūki, the film focuses on the relationship between Van and Hitomi and their personal issues. The characters themselves are also given different personalities; in the film Hitomi changes from a cheerful girl in love to a depressed, suicidal schoolgirl who suffers from self-induced feelings of loneliness and alienation and Van is now a violent, hot-headed man. In the film the world of Gaea has a more Asian design than the heavily European-influenced television series.

=== Other media ===
Victor Entertainment released one drama CD for the series, Escaflowne Original Drama Album, which was released on December 18, 1996. A video game based on the series, also titled The Vision of Escaflowne was released to the PlayStation system by Bandai Games in 1997. A limited-edition version came packaged with a small collector's book and 26 tarot cards. The action-adventure game had an altered plot line and featured additional characters.

== Reception ==
Though well received, The Vision of Escaflowne was not as popular in Japan as producers hoped. Outside Japan, however, it was a worldwide hit. In the United States, it outsold Gundam on video tape; and the first volume of the English DVD release of The Vision of Escaflowne was the fourth best-selling anime DVD for the month of September 2000. The series aired in South Korea where it enjoyed consistently high ratings. Producers noted that it was the worldwide success that led to the eventual creation of the anime film, Escaflowne.

Egan Loo, writing for Animerica, considered it an "epic fantasy" with some of the "most dramatic music in any soundtrack, anime, or live-action", and a "breathless pacing" that result in its being an "acclaimed masterpiece." The Anime Encyclopaedia calls it the "genuine family entertainment, both in and out of the anime world, and arguably the best TV anime of the 1990s". It is called a "fantastically beautiful series, with striking production design" and an "incredibly well executed fusion of familiar anime genres and devices" by Anime Classics Zettai!.

Preceded by Sorcerer Hunters (10/3/1995 – 3/26/1996)	TV Tokyo Tuesday 18:00 Timeframe; The Vision of Escaflowne (April 2, 1996 – September 24, 1996)	Succeeded by Saber Marionette J (10/1/1996 – 3/25/1997)
