= Natsumi Itsuki =

Japanese shōjo manga artist (born 1960)

Natsumi Itsuki 樹なつみ
- Born: 5 February 1960 (age 66) Kobe, Hyogo, Japan
- Area: Manga artist
- Notable works: Hanasakeru Seishōnen; Jyu Oh Sei; Eight Clouds Rising
- Awards: 1993 Seiun Award for best science fiction manga - Oz; 1997 Kodansha Manga Award for shōjo - Eight Clouds Rising

Natsumi Itsuki (樹なつみ, Itsuki Natsumi; born 5 February 1960 in Kobe, Hyogo, Japan) is a Japanese shōjo manga artist best known for writing science fiction manga. She debuted in 1979 with Megumi-chan ni Sasageru Comedy in LaLa. She won the 1993 Seiun Award for best science fiction manga for Oz and the 1997 Kodansha Manga Award for shōjo manga for Eight Clouds Rising. Several of her works have been adapted as anime, including Jyu Oh Sei, Oz, Eight Clouds Rising, and Hanasakeru Seishōnen. Her series Demon Sacred and Jyu Oh Sei are licensed in North America by Tokyopop, and the anime of Jyu Oh Sei is distributed in English by Funimation.

== Works ==
Story & Art (manga)

- Vampir
- Demon Sacred
- Hanasakeru Seishōnen
- Jyu-Oh-Sei
- Oz
- Eight Clouds Rising
- Marcello Storia
- Passion Parade
- Tokiiro Triangle
- Eccentric City

Original story (OAV, anime television series)
OVA

- Yakumo Tatsu
- Oz

Anime television series

- Jyu Oh Sei
- Hanasakeru Seishōnen
