= Hanasakeru Seishōnen =

Manga

- Cover of Hanasakeru Seishōnen volume 1, as published by Hakusensha

花咲ける青少年 (Hanasakeru Seishōnen)
- Genre: Drama, Romance
- Manga
- Written by: Natsumi Itsuki
- Published by: Hakusensha
- Magazine: LaLa
- Original run: 1987 – 1994
- Volumes: 12
- Anime television series
- Directed by: Chiaki Kon (1-23); Hajime Kamegaki (24-39)
- Produced by: Atsuko Nishiwaki; Atsuya Hirooka; Yuji Shibata; Dōkō Honma
- Written by: Mamiko Ikeda
- Music by: Tetsuya Saitō; Gō Satō
- Studio: Studio Pierrot
- Licensed by: NA: Discotek Media
- Original network: NHK
- Original run: April 5, 2009 – February 14, 2010
- Episodes: 39
- Manga

Hanasakeru Seishōnen Special Edition
- Written by: Natsumi Itsuki
- Published by: Hakusensha
- Imprint: Hana to Yume Comics Special
- Magazine: MELODY
- Original run: August 2009 – April 2014
- Volumes: 5

Hanasakeru Seishōnen (花咲ける青少年; "Youth That Can Bloom") is a Japanese manga series written and illustrated by Natsumi Itsuki. Set in the modern era, the story follows the path to romance of fourteen-year-old Kajika Burnsworth, daughter of powerful industrialist Harry Burnsworth, owner of the Burnsworth international conglomerate giant. Kajika agrees to participate in a "marriage game" with her father, in which she must select her future husband out of three men that her father has supposedly preselected for her.

Despite its shōjo-romance undertones, the story itself evolves as a power political mystery involving a small, southeast Asian country called Raginei (purportedly near Malaysia). Raginei as a country is only 1,000 years old, but became extremely wealthy within the last 50 years or so due to a change in ideals implemented by past King Machaty that allowed the international export of oil. While Kajika searches for her suitors and puzzles over the concept of love, the country is thrown into political turmoil and Kajika's friendship with Prince Rumatti Ivan, as well as the Burnsworth relationship with Raginei, lands her right in the middle of it all.

== Plot ==
Fourteen-year-old Kajika Burnsworth, daughter of powerful industrialist Harry Burnsworth, has spent the first part of her life living on an island in the Caribbean with a snow leopard named Mustafa. She is finally sent off to school in Japan, but is called away to her father's home in New York very soon after.

While there, Kajika gets talked into the "marriage game" by her father. In this game, she has to meet and choose a possible future husband out of three males that her father has supposedly handpicked. He does not, however, tell her details regarding their identities and leaves it to Kajika to discover the bachelors on her own. According to the rules, if she picks one of the three men, Harry will tell Kajika her true destiny. Her childhood friend, Li Ren Huang, is charged with helping her on her mission while protecting her as her guardian. As leader of the powerful Huang family, Li Ren is most qualified for the task, though whether Li Ren is comfortable with helping Kajika find a husband remains to be seen.

She first meets Eugene Alexandre De Volkan, a beautiful man whom she calls Mustafa because of his uncanny resemblance to the now dead snow leopard she once loved. Second is Prince Rumaty Ivan of Raginei, though Kajika takes a while to decide whether Rumaty is, in fact, one of the men her father selected for her. The third bachelor Kajika meets is Carl Rosenthal of the Rosenthal family and corporation, a Burnsworth competitor. Carl's father hates Harry Burnsworth, to the point where he becomes obsessed with discrediting him. Carl, on the other hand, finds room to be more forgiving, especially with the developing friendship between himself and the gentle, understanding Kajika Burnsworth. All three men are unique in their own ways and Kajika ends up liking each of them very much. As such, she does her best to make all of them a part of her life.

Meanwhile, nearly a year after meeting Prince Rumaty, his country plummets into political turmoil and the King dies. Prince Rumaty is blamed for the King's death, despite his presence in another country during the event and he is banned from returning Raginei under the threat of death. Harry Burnsworth shelters Rumaty, leaving him in the care of Li Leng, who becomes somewhat of a tutor of diplomacy to him. The Prince grows up during his two years at the Burnsworth estate and eventually makes his move to re-enter the country and bring things back under control.

Kajika, Li Ren, Eugene, and Carl Rosenthal get caught up in the country's troubles and all four of them are trapped within its borders when chaos breaks out. Li Ren is injured during a coup d'état battle at the airport and he and Kajika are both sheltered by a Rumaty-supporting faction led by Isaac Noei, once a high-ranking officer in the Royal guard. No one is safe from danger. Officials are murdered, elite families are arrested, priests are framed, and even Noei's hideout is raided.

Two pivotal events occur in Raginei that bring the story to climax. It is during the events in Raginei that Kajika realizes which man she loves most. Also, by the time Prince Rumaty reaches Raginei, Kajika's destiny is revealed to her and the "marriage game" is thus over.

== Characters ==
=== Protagonists and supporting characters ===
Kajika Louisa Kugami Burnsworth (花鹿・ルイーサ・陸深・バーンズワース)
Kajika Louisa Kugami Burnsworth is the main protagonist and she is the sole daughter of World-renowned Burnsworth Corporation's owner, Harry Burnsworth. She inherited her father's charisma, and currently lives an uninhibited lifestyle. However, from the time she was very young, she lived on a solitary island in the Caribbean for about ten years. Since she grew up in isolation, Kajika often lacks common knowledge about the world, and always becomes fascinated with her surroundings. Her Japanese mother died when she tried to protect Kajika from getting kidnapped. She makes her first appearance at age fourteen. Voiced by: Aya Endo
Lee Leng Huang (倣 立人（ファン・リーレン）)
In exchange for Lee Leng becoming Kajika's watchdog for the duration of the "husband game", Harry offers Lee Leng a stronger business relationship between Burnsworth and Huang. Lee Leng is also asked to give Harry his opinions on each candidate and Kajika's feelings towards them. Lee Leng accepts the verbal contract for the sake of the Fang Group, despite his feelings for Kajika. In the past, Lee Leng had always acted like a big brother to Kajika. Both had known each other since they were children, Lee Leng visiting the island where Kajika lived 2-3 times a year for the past 10 years. Voiced by: Toshiyuki Morikawa
Toranosuke V Haga (寅之介・V・芳賀)
Toranosuke V Haga is Kajika's baby-faced second generation Japanese-American bodyguard. He is very skilled at his job, but he is very docile and has a somewhat childish personality. He makes his first appearance at age seventeen. Voiced by: Tetsuya Kakihara
Harry Burnsworth (ハリー・バーンズワース)
Harry Burnsworth is Kajika's father. He naturally developed his own company, and is a charismatic industrialist that owns a first-generation international conglomerate. There is a grave secret regarding his birth. His biological father may be Prince Mahaty as mentioned in episode 11 by Kathleen, with Fred asking if he could raise Kathleen's and Mahaty's son. Harry later confessed to Lee Leng that his father is Prince Mahaty. Voiced by: Hozumi Goda

=== Burnsworth relatives ===
Frederick Burnsworth (フレドリック・バーンズワース)
Frederick Burnsworth is Harry's foster father, and Kajika's foster grandfather. His nickname is Fred, and he is a novelist. He is a Great Friend of Mahaty Sheik. Older: Voiced by: Mitsuo Senda, Younger: Voiced by: Hirofumi Nojima
Kathleen Burnsworth (キャスリーン・バーンズワース)
Kathleen Burnsworth is Harry's mother, and Kajika's grandmother. She passes away three years before Kajika visits Fred's house for the first time. Older: Voiced by: Tamie Kubota, Younger: Voiced by: Akiko Kimura

=== Kajika's husband candidates ===
Eugene Alenxandr de Volkan (ユージィン・アレキサンドル・ド・ヴォルカン)
Eugene Alenxandr de Volkan is descended from French nobility and is the third son of the Volkan corporation. As a rare beauty possessing emerald green eyes and platinum blond hair, Eugene often catches the attention of many women. However, Eugene is suicidal, and often toys with the emotions of these women in an attempt to get them to take his life. Sadly, he has driven many women to suicide as they can not bear to harm him. After having the will to live with Kajika's help, he frequently helps out. He loves Kajika; he says that he will do anything if Kajika orders him. Eugene also says if Kajika chooses a man to love, he will accept it even if his sorrow consumes him. Kajika views Eugene as the reincarnation of her pet leopard Mustafa, Kajika takes an instant liking to him. Voiced by: Daisuke Ono
Rumaty Ivan Di Raginei (ルマティ・イヴァン・ダイ・ラギネイ)
Rumaty Ivan Di Raginei is the second prince of the Raginei kingdom, which was able to rapidly expand thanks to an abundant natural supply of oil. Resembling his grandfather Machaty in personality, Rumaty is next in line for the crown after his elder brother. Coincidentally, his eyes and face closely resemble that of Kajika. In episode 21 it is revealed that he is Kajika's cousin, for Harry and Woold are half-brothers. Rumaty matures as the series progresses. He develops romantic feelings for Kajika. Voiced by: Daisuke Namikawa
Carl Rosenthal (カール・ローゼンタール)
Carl Rosenthal is a son to a competing corporation of the Burnsworth enterprise and therefore a third husband candidate in Kajika's game with her father. He is claustrophobic because when he was six years old he fell in a well. Carl falls in love with Kajika and says it feels comfortable around her. Voiced by: Fukuyama Jun

=== Raginei Kingdom ===
Mahaty Sheik Di Raginei (マハティ・シェイク・ダイ・ラギネイ)
Mahaty Sheik Di Raginei is the former king of Raginei kingdom and grandfather of Rumaty. He is now resigned after passing the throne to Woold, Rumaty and Somand's father. Voiced by: Daisuke Namikawa
Quinza Hafez (クインザ・ハフェズ)
Quinza Hafez is a sharp and able chamberlain who serves Rumaty. He sees qualities of a king in Rumaty who is the second son of the current king and second in line for the throne. As such, he is scheming to instigate a bloody uprising in the Raginei kingdom with the intent of making Rumaty king. Voiced by: Takehito Koyasu
Isaac Noei (イザック・ノエイ)
Isaac Noei is an officer of the Raginei kingdom's imperial guard. When he first appeared in the anime, he was a lieutenant, but gets promoted to captain later on. Voiced by: Hiroshi Tsuchida
Sezun Hafez (セズン・ハフェズ)
Sezun Hafez is Rumaty's sole attendant, and Quinza's younger brother. Voiced by: Miyu Irino
Najayra Isa Shadri (ナジェイラ・イサ・シャドリ)
Najayra is the princess of Raginei kingdom, and is the cousin of Rumaty and Izmail. Voiced by: Satomi Arai
Izmal (イズマル)
Izmal is a prince of Raginei kingdom, and is Najayra's and Rumaty's cousin. Voiced by: Kazuyuki Okitsu
Somand Ilya di Raginei (ソマンド・イリヤ・ダイ・ラギネイ)
Somand is the crown prince of the Raginei kingdom, and is Rumaty's elder brother.Voiced by: Masahiro Yamanaka

=== Huang family ===
Monchen Zao (曹望青)
Monchen Zao is a close associate and advisor to Li Leng. The Zaos have served the Huang family for generations, but Monchen did not intend to do so as well at first. However, upon meeting the young Li Leng, he decided to follow the Huang family as Li Leng's servant. Voiced by: Junichi Suwabe
Tonsen Huang (倣東旋)
Tonsen Huang is the 5th senior executive of the Huang corporation, and is critical of the Burnsworth corporation and the newly appointed Li Leng. Voiced by: Deyuki Umezu

=== Other characters ===
Yui Yamate (山手由依, Yamate Yui)
Yui Yamate is one of Kajika's classmates from when she was an international exchange student at a Japanese high school. After certain incidents occur, she becomes friends with Kajika. Voiced by: Miyu Matsuki
Eddy Roberts (エディ・ロバーツ)
Eddy Roberts is a freelance journalist. He has been acquainted with Eugene for quite some time, and uses this to get close to Kajika and her friends. One year after Rumaty is chased out of his country, he is successful in getting the sole interview from him. Voiced by: Yasuhiro Mamiya
Alain
Voiced by: Daisuke Ono
Dong Xuan Huang (倣慶昌)
Dong-Xuan Huang is Li Leng's uncle. Voiced by: Hideyuki Umezu
Bridget Huang (倣ブリジット)
Bridget Huang is Li Leng's aunt and Dong Xuan's wife. She had an incestuous relationship with Li Leng in the past and is jealous of Kajika.
Leon
Another lover of Bridget Huang.

== Media ==
=== Manga ===
Hanasakeru Seishōnen is written and illustrated by Natsumi Itsuki. The manga's first part, Mahaty's story (often called Mahaty Arc (マハティ編, Mahati-hen) was serialized in Hakusensha's shōjo magazine (aimed at teenage girls), LaLa from February 24, 1987, to March 24, 1987, the main story was serialized from August 24, 1989, and August 24, 1994. A sequel manga, Hanasakeru Seishōnen Special Edition written by Natsumi Itsuki was serialised in Hakusensha's MELODY from August 2009 to April 2014. The Special Edition was released in Taiwan by Tong Li Publishing.

=== Premium Fan Book ===
A fan book titled Hanasakeru Seishōnen Premium Fanbook (花咲ける青少年 プレミアムファンブック) illustrated by Natsumi Itsuki was released by Hakusensha on December 5, 2011.

=== Anime ===
The manga was adapted into an anime by Studio Pierrot. Directed by Chiaki Kon, the anime aired between April 5, 2009, to February 14, 2010, on NHK.

The opening song, CHANGE, was performed by J-Min, as was the ending song, One.

The anime has been licensed by Discotek Media for a Blu-ray release to come on November 24, 2020. On February 24, 2021, Digital Rights Media announced that they would add the anime series to their steaming site RetroCrush.

=== Stage ===
Hanasakeru Seishōnen has also been made into a stageplay. The first one is, besides Hanasakeru Seishōnen, also named The Budding Beauty and the second The Budding Beauty in The Oriental Blue Wind was held in February 2011 and was later streamed on the official USTREAM website in December 2011. Both plays were released on DVD.
