= Kazuki Akane =

Japanese animation director

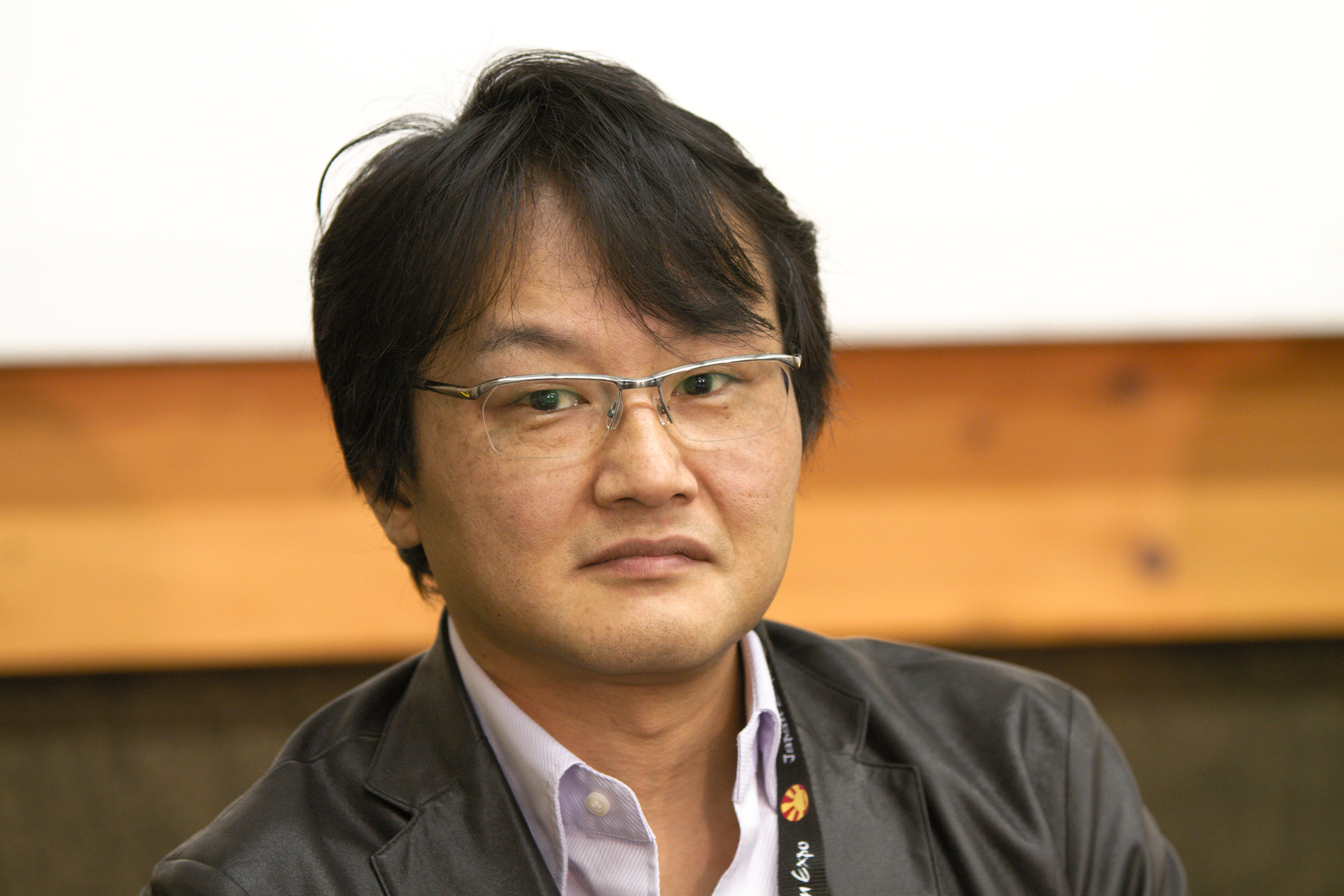
- Akane at Japan Expo Sud 2010
- Born: March 24, 1962 (age 63); Osaka, Osaka Prefecture, Japan
- Occupation: Japanese anime director
- Years active: 1986-present

Kazuki Akane (赤根 和樹, Akane Kazuki; born March 24, 1962, in Osaka, Osaka Prefecture) is a Japanese animation director. Until the early 2000s, he was a staff member of the anime studio Sunrise, where he collaborated with Shoji Kawamori to direct his most famous work, The Vision of Escaflowne. Since that time, he worked extensively with Satelight (and occasionally again with Kawamori, who is the studio's executive director) before going freelance once more to direct the Birdy the Mighty TV series, among other projects.

== List of works ==
- Mobile Suit Gundam ZZ series (1986–1987) - Production Runner (numerous episodes)
- Mobile Suit Gundam: Char's Counterattack movie (1988) - Production Runner
- Jushin Liger series (1989–1990) - Episode Director
- Dragon Quest series (1989–1991) - Storyboard Artist (episode 17)
- Future GPX Cyber Formula series (1991) - Storyboard Artist, Unit Director
- Mobile Suit Gundam F91 movie (1991) - Assistant Director
- Mobile Suit Gundam 0083: Stardust Memory OVA series (1991–1992) - Unit Director
- Dirty Pair Flash: Mission III OVA series (1995–1996) - Storyboard Artist (episode 2)
- The Vision of Escaflowne series (1996) - Director, Storyboard Artist (numerous episodes), Unit Director (episode 24)
- Cowboy Bebop series (1998–1999) - Storyboard Artist (episode 3)
- Turn A Gundam series (1999–2000) - Storyboard Artist
- Escaflowne: A Girl in Gaea movie (2000) - Director, Script (with Ryota Yamaguchi)
- Geneshaft series (2001) - Director, Storyboard Artist, Planner
- Heat Guy J series (2002–2003) - Original Creator, Director, Screenplay, Storyboard Artist, Planner
- Samurai Champloo series (2004–2005) - Storyboard Artist
- Genesis of Aquarion series (2005) - Storyboard Artist (episode 2)
- Noein series (2005) - Original Creator, Director, Series Composition, Script (episodes 1, 2, 16), Episode Director (episode 24), Storyboard Artist (opening credits, 1, 2, 16, 24)
- Ergo Proxy series (2006) - Storyboard Artist (episode 20)
- Birdy the Mighty Decode series (2008), Director
- Code Geass: Akito the Exiled (2012–2016) - Director, Script
- Stars Align (2019), Director
