= List of Noragami episodes =

Cover of the first Noragami home media release

Noragami is an anime television series adapted from the manga of the same name by Adachitoka. It is produced by Bones and directed by Kotaro Tamura with character designs by Toshihiro Kawamoto. The series follows a poor deity named Yato, who desires to become a famous god, and his adventures with a human girl named Hiyori, whose spirit frequently leaves her body, and Yukine, a young wandering spirit whom he adopts as his weapon.

Prior to the series' television premiere, its first episode was screened at 2013's Anime Festival Asia on November 10, 2013. The anime began airing in Japan on January 5, 2014, on Tokyo MX and later on MBS, BS11 and TVA. Funimation licensed the anime for streaming in North America. Madman Entertainment licensed the anime for distribution in Australia and New Zealand.

Two additional episodes were released on DVDs, bundled with the limited edition of the 10th and 11th manga volumes, published on February 17 and July 17, 2014. The opening theme song is "Goya no Machiawase" (午夜の待ち合わせ; Overnight Appointment) by Hello Sleepwalkers. The ending theme song is "Heart Realize" (ハートリアライズ, Hāto Riaraizu) by Supercell and sung by Tia.

The anime's second season, Noragami Aragoto, was announced in March 2015 by Kodansha. The series aired between October 2, 2015, and December 25, 2015. For this season, the opening theme song is "Kyōran Hey Kids!!" (狂乱Hey Kids!!) by The Oral Cigarettes, and the ending theme song is "Nirvana" (ニルバナ, Nirubana) by Tia.

== Episodes ==
=== Season 1 ===
No.	Title	Original air date
1	"A Housecat, a Stray God, and a Tail"; Transliteration: "Ieneko to Noragami to Shippo" (Japanese: 家猫と野良神と尻尾)	January 5, 2014
Yato answers a prayer worth five yen to defeat a Snake Phantom, using his Regalia, a divine weapon, named Tomone. However, Tomone terminates her contract with Yato due to his impoverished state. When Hiyori Iki saves Yato from being hit by a bus, she briefly has an out-of-body experience. After she is taken to the hospital, Yato introduces himself as a God to her. The next day, Hiyori begins having drowsy spells despite full recovery. Yato encounters a Toad Phantom, but Hiyori helps him escape. Due to the bus incident, she has become a Half-Phantom; her spirit can frequently leave her human body. Hiyori wishes to return to normal, and Yato accepts the wish for five yen.
2	"Snow-like"; Transliteration: "Yuki no Yōna" (Japanese: 雪のような)	January 12, 2014
Hiyori tries to adjust to her new form, realizing her human body falls asleep when she leaves it. Yato says he cannot help her until he acquires a new Regalia. Hiyori searches for a new Regalia for him, assuming it can be a Phantom. Due to this misconception, she and Yato are chased by a Crab Phantom. Yato, protecting Hiyori, incurs a blight from the Phantom, a wound that can spread if left untreated. He explains that Hiyori's tail is her lifeline to her physical form; she would die if it was severed. After spotting an uncorrupted innocent spirit, Yato adopts it as his new Regalia and uses it to defeat the Phantom. Yato gives his Regalia the name Yukine, who reverts to a teenage boy when his name is spoken.
3	"Bidden Calamity"; Transliteration: "Manekareta Yakusai" (Japanese: 招かれた厄災)	January 19, 2014
Yukine tries to adjust to life with Yato as his master. Yato reveals that he and Yukine share the same mind and body. They are summoned by Tenjin, the God of Learning, who commissions Yato to destroy a Hand Phantom at a railroad track that makes people commit suicide. Yato destroys it before a schoolboy kills himself. Although Hiyori was upset that Yato has contempt for those wanting to die, she realizes it is because he is angry that they do not value the simple blessing of being alive; he is unwilling to let suicide happen in front of Yukine or any Regalia, as they are the spirits of dead humans who wanted to live.
4	"Where Happiness Lies"; Transliteration: "Shiawase no Arika" (Japanese: しあわせの在処)	January 26, 2014
Yato brings Hiyori and Yukine to meet a fellow God named Kofuku and her Regalia named Daikoku. Yato is summoned by a suicidal office worker named Yusuke on the roof of a building and learns that Yusuke suffered misfortune after falling in love with a girl. After Yato realizes that this girl is Kofuku, revealed as the God of Poverty, he uses Yukine to sever Yusuke's ties with her, saving him. Hiyori learns that Yato is a God of Calamity, one who would kill in the past if people wished it simply so that he would not be forgotten. Yukine and Hiyori encounter the mysterious Nora, Yato's former Regalia.
5	"Borderline"; Transliteration: "Kyōkaisen" (Japanese: 境界線)	February 2, 2014
Yukine learns to draw a borderline, a barrier against Phantoms. Hiyori has Yukine stay at her house, since Yato cannot look after him properly. Yato reveals that Yukine has a fear of the dark. After Hiyori stops Yukine from stealing a skateboard, he runs away. Yato explains that Regalia like Yukine can feel pain, but this does not pertain to Gods, as they are all-powerful. Yukine encounters the spirit of a girl who was killed in a traffic accident. Although he tries to protect her, the girl becomes possessed by a Yeti Phantom, forcing Yato and Yukine to kill her against Yukine's will.
6	"Scary Person"; Transliteration: "Kowai Hito" (Japanese: コワイヒト)	February 9, 2014
Yukine's conflicting emotions about his role as Yato's Regalia affects Yato physically and causes his blight to become worse, since Gods are connected to their Regalia. Yato is attacked by Bishamon, a powerful God with many Regalia. Bishamon holds a grudge against Yato because he killed her former Regalia in the past, a matter that upsets both Yukine and Hiyori. In an attempt to stop the battle, Kofuku uses Daikoku to open up a Vent to unleash many Phantoms as a distraction, though Bishamon manages to severely injure Yato before retreating. Yato is saved in time by Nora.
7	"Uncertainty and Destiny"; Transliteration: "Mayoigoto, Sadamegoto" (Japanese: 迷い事、定め事)	February 16, 2014
Yukine now wants to leave Yato, feeling unimportant and angry at his condition. Tenjin explains to Hiyori that Regalia who abandon their God and serve other Gods are called Noras and are frowned upon, revealing Yato's mysterious Nora from before. Kazuma, Bishamon's Regalia, protects Hiyori from being noticed by Bishamon, aware of Hiyori's ability. He tells her that Yukine's immoral acts will eventually cause Yato to die. Yukine flees after being caught stealing charity money by Yato and the others. Hiyori tells Yato to consider Yukine as a person rather than just a tool. Yato later uses Yukine to take down a Moth Phantom.
8	"Over the Line"; Transliteration: "Issen o Koete" (Japanese: 一線を越えて)	February 23, 2014
Yato is summoned at Hiyori's high school by a student named Manabu Ogiwara, who is being bullied by another student. Yukine grieves over the fact that he cannot have friends or experience high school like a living person. Manabu, encouraged by a Shadow Phantom with the intent to kill, confronts Hashimoto with a pocket knife given to him by Yato. Manabu overcomes the Shadow Phantom, saving his humanity. Yukine succumbs to his anguish and shatters the school windows; this final immoral act causes Yato to collapse near death. Despite becoming contaminated by Yato's blight after touching him, Hiyori carries him to Kofuku and Daikoku, begging for help. However, Daikoku shuts them out with a borderline.
9	"Name"; Transliteration: "Namae" (Japanese: 名前)	March 2, 2014
Kofuku and Daikoku only allow Hiyori to enter so she can be cleansed from blight. The only way to save Yato now is by Yukine receiving punishment through an ablution, requiring three Regalia. Daikoku enlists Tenjin's Mayu, who was previously Yato's Regalia Tomone, and Hiyori recruits Kazuma. The three force Yukine to endure pain until he repents and confesses his sins. His refusal causes him to start turning into a Bat Phantom. Hiyori begs Yukine to stop burdening Yato or else she will end their friendship, and Yato calls out to him. Yukine finally breaks down and apologizes, allowing the ablution to be successful. Yato and Yukine thank Hiyori for saving their lives. Meanwhile, Nora awakens a God named Rabō.
10	"Regarded with Hate"; Transliteration: "Imu Beki Mono" (Japanese: 忌むべき者)	March 9, 2014
Yukine takes up a part-time job at Daikoku's food stand to help repay what he stole, and wants to use Hiyori's old textbooks to learn like a normal student. Tenjin suggests Yato sever ties with Hiyori to return her to normal, which upsets him. Hiyori invites the boys to the New Year's festival, but they get held up by a nest of Scorpion Phantoms that Rabō sent to test Yato's strength. Hiyori is attacked by Wolf Phantoms from Nora, who tells her that Rabō wants to kill Yato. When Yato and Yukine meet Hiyori, they are surprised to find that she no longer remembers Yato.
11	"Abandoned God"; Transliteration: "Suterareta Kami" (Japanese: 棄てられた神)	March 16, 2014
Yato and Yukine unsuccessfully try to find ways to bring back Hiyori's memory. Nora reveals that she stole Hiyori's memories of Yato, in the form of a jewel. Rabō attacks them with Nora as his Regalia; Yato is unable to beat him. Nora states that she will return Hiyori's memory only if Yato can defeat Rabō. It is revealed that Rabō is a God of Calamity who answers evil wishes to kill, and Yato had worked with him in the past, once as powerful as Rabō. Yukine becomes devastated when Hiyori forgets him too, prompting Yato to decide to restore her memory despite the risks.
12	"A Scrap of a Memory"; Transliteration: "Hitohira no Kioku" (Japanese: 一片の記憶)	March 23, 2014
Hiyori accidentally comes along with Yato and Yukine when they warp to Rabō's shrine. Rabō destroys the jewel containing Hiyori's memories, causing her to fall unconscious. At this, Yato unleashes a rage that delights Rabō, who wants to see Yato as the powerful depraved God of Calamity that he was in the past. Rabō absorbs and merges with a Storm Phantom, which was formed due to their fierce fight. Yato protects Hiyori from a boulder, and his scent brings back her memories, awakening her. Rabō dies, content that he died at Yato's hands. Yato tells Hiyori that she will be happier if she severs ties with them. However, Hiyori refuses, stating she wants to be with Yato forever. Yato happily accepts her wish for five yen.
OAD–1	"God's Possession, God's Curse"; Transliteration: "Kamigakari, Kamitatari" (Japanese: 神憑り、神祟り)	February 17, 2014
Hiyori's first day at high school becomes a nightmare when Yato possesses her body and does all sorts of embarrassing things to spread word of his services to the other students. Hiyori and Yukine come upon a perverted student who has been possessed by a Phantom. When the student attempts to commit suicide upon being discovered, Yato rescues him and subdues the Phantom, but ends up breaking his shoulder in the process. As such, Yato is caught and given punishment while Hiyori begins her next day of school with a bizarre reputation.
OAD–2	"A Promise in Spring"; Transliteration: "Haru no yakusoku" (Japanese: 春の約束)	July 17, 2014
During the spring, Hiyori invites all the Gods and Regalia together for a flower-viewing party. Due to their feud, Yato and Bishamon are unable to get along and have a drinking contest. In their drunken state, Bishamon blames herself for the death of her clans, and Yato's antics prompt a fierce brawl that ends the party. The next day, Yukine receives a magazine for Regalia that Yato had been hiding from him, which includes a questionnaire for Yukine about his job as Yato's Regalia. Yato receives a subtle punishment for his misbehavior, but feels relieved when he sees that Yukine does not want to change his job.

=== Season 2: Aragoto ===
No.	Title	Original air date
1	"Bearing a Posthumous Name"; Transliteration: "Imina, Nigirite" (Japanese: 諱、握りて)	October 2, 2015
Yato, Yukine, and Hiyori fight a Bunny Plushie Phantom that manifested from a baby they were taking care of. Yato tells Yukine to avoid Bishamon, who rescues the spirit of a young girl from a flock of Crow Phantoms, claiming the girl into her family and names her Mineha. However, Bishamon falls ill from being stung due to her Regalia's pain. Kugaha, another of her Regalia, tells her that Kazuma helped in the ablution for Yato, but she does not believe this. Yukine befriends a boy named Suzuha, who happens to be one of Bishamon's Regalia.
2	"One of Her Memories"; Transliteration: "Kanojo no Omoide" (Japanese: 彼女の思い出)	October 9, 2015
Suzuha tells Yukine about a human girl who visited him every summer but forgot him each year she returned, as human memories of Far Shore beings are flimsy. Yukine now fears Hiyori will forget him and Yato as she gets older. Kugaha gets Suzuha killed, which puts Bishamon in pain. Noticing that Bishamon has incurred a blight, Kazuma gathers her Regalia to find the culprit, but is surprised that they are all untainted. Kugaha ambushes Yato, but Yato defeats him unarmed. Kugaha remarks on Yato's incredible strength, noting that it must be because he has strong ties to the Near Shore – Hiyori. Kugaha plans to destroy Bishamon by breaking her family of Regalia.
3	"False Bond"; Transliteration: "Itsuwari no Kizuna" (Japanese: イツワリノ絆)	October 16, 2015
Yukine learns of Suzuha's death from Kazuma and is inadvertently warped with him to Bishamon's shrine. When Bishamon confronts Kazuma about Yato's ablution, Kazuma tells her that Yato is in fact her savior, before protecting Yukine from being shot by her. This causes Bishamon to exile Kazuma, as she hesitates to revoke him from her completely. Kazuma is taken in by Kofuku and Daikoku. Aiha, the corrupt Regalia in Bishamon's clan, attacks Yato, and Kugaha kidnaps Kazuma and Hiyori's soul, leaving behind her unconscious body.
4	"Wish"; Transliteration: "Negai" (Japanese: 願)	October 23, 2015
While the two are imprisoned, Kazuma reveals to Hiyori that he is the sole survivor of Bishamon's former Regalia clan. In the past, Bishamon incurred a blight from a corrupt Regalia. When the clan succumbed to chaos and became a Blob Phantom, Kazuma asked Yato to kill them to save Bishamon. This is the reason Kazuma is indebted to Yato and why Bishamon hates him. Kugaha plans to become Kazuma's successor after killing Bishamon and reincarnating her. Yato and Yukine fight Bishamon, mistakenly believing she kidnapped Hiyori. When Bishamon is about to kill Yato, Yukine jumps in front to protect him, being cleaved in half.
5	"Divine Acclamation, Imprecation"; Transliteration: "Kamuhosaki, Hosakiki" (Japanese: 神祝き、呪きき)	October 30, 2015
Due to his undying loyalty to Yato, Yukine evolves into a Blessed Vessel. While Bishamon continues to incur an extreme blight, Kugaha sends a Dinosaur Fossil Phantom to devour Bishamon's Regalia, further weakening her. Guilty and dying, Aiha releases Hiyori and Kazuma. The two try to stop the fight but when Bishamon charges at Yato, Kazuma pushes him out of the way and takes the blow. Wounded, he confesses that he was responsible for the deaths of her former Regalia, and Bishamon cries with Kazuma in her arms.
6	"What Must be Done"; Transliteration: "Nasubeki Koto" (Japanese: 為すべきこと)	November 6, 2015
Kugaha reveals himself and tells Bishamon that she must reincarnate to repent for her sinful acts. Yato chops off Kugaha's right hand, stating that such a concept does not pertain to a God as Gods do not commit wrong. Bishamon is initially willing to believe in his best intentions, but when she learns about the Phantom attacking her Regalia, she revokes him from her family. Yato, Yukine, and Hiyori leave as Bishamon kills the Dinosaur Fossil Phantom and the Regalia it devoured. Later, Kazuma awakes in bed, having healed, and reflects that he has failed as an exemplar. Bishamon is also healed after undergoing an ablution with Aiha. Kazuma asks her to revoke him but Bishamon remarks that humans make mistakes, and she asks him to be her guiding voice once again.
7	"How to Worship a God"; Transliteration: "Kamisama no Matsuri Kata" (Japanese: 神様の祀り方)	November 13, 2015
Upon returning, Yato is reminded by Tenjin about the promise he made to sever ties with Hiyori, but does not keep this promise when Hiyori reminds him that she had wished to be with him forever. Ebisu, one of the Seven Gods of Fortune, comes to Yato with a suitcase full of money in hopes of buying Yukine since he is now a Blessed Vessel, one who must protect their God as a guiding voice. Yato and Yukine follow a Coin Purse Phantom, in which Yukine uses the money as bait and Yato annihilates it. Yukine ultimately declines Ebisu's offer, wishing to be a strong guide for Yato. Yato becomes depressed due to the lack of a shrine, as this means people do not need him. Hiyori builds him a miniature shrine, making Yato cry tears of joy.
8	"God of Calamity"; Transliteration: "Magatsukami" (Japanese: 禍津神)	November 20, 2015
Yato reveals that the miniature shrine has been recognized as an official shrine by Takamagahara, the Heavenly Realm. Yukine asks Kazuma to teach him how to do invocations, and he agrees. Kofuku explains to Hiyori that a God vanishes when forgotten. Yato meets with Nora to release her, but is taken when his father appears. His disappearance worries Hiyori and Yukine. Nora influences Yato to kill a convict who murdered someone's daughter. She promises that he will be free to leave if he completes one last request from his father.
9	"The Sound of a Thread Snapping"; Transliteration: "Ito no Kireru Oto" (Japanese: 糸の切れる音)	November 27, 2015
It has now been a month since Yato has gone missing. He must rescue a conjurer from the Underworld as his last job. A colloquy at Takamagahara suspects the conjurer is Ebisu, possibly controlling Phantoms. In the Underworld, Yato meets Ebisu, who wants a Locution Brush, a brush that will allow him to control Phantoms without suffering a blight. They are captured by Izanami, the queen of the Underworld, but after receiving the Brush, Ebisu and Yato try to escape. Hiyori becomes distressed when she forgets Yato, and is unwillingly kissed by a classmate during a triple date with her friends at Capypa Land.
10	"A Certain Desire"; Transliteration: "Kaku Arishi Nozomi" (Japanese: 斯く在りし望み)	December 4, 2015
When Yukine comes to meet her, Hiyori finally remembers him and Yato. Ebisu reveals that he wants to control Phantoms for the sake of humanity to prevent them from misfortune. Yukine, Kazuma, and Daikoku discover that Ebisu is with Yato in the Underworld, and the remaining Six Gods of Fortune are imprisoned in Takamagahara until Ebisu receives punishment for his crime. Kazuma frees the Gods, while Hiyori and Yukine head to the sealed doorway of the Underworld. Ebisu decides to surrender to save Yato from Izanami. Yato encourages him to live, and Ebisu opens a vent to escape. However, Yato is caught by Izanami.
11	"Revival"; Transliteration: "Kousen Kaeri" (Japanese: 黄泉返り)	December 11, 2015
Hiyori and Yukine encounter Kugaha, who is impervious to Yukine's attacks since he is now a Nora. Thanks to Hiyori regaining his confidence, Yukine is able to beat him. Bishamon and Kazuma find an injured Ebisu outside. Kofuku and Daikoku open a vent and Bishamon enters to save Yato, as Hiyori, Yukine, and the others wait. Yato and Nora are captured by Izanami, but Bishamon arrives and battles her, apologizing to Yato for her grudge against him. She motivates him to fight back when she reveals that Hiyori and Yukine are waiting for him. When Kofuku is unable to reopen the vent, Ebisu says that the only other way to bring back Yato and Bishamon will require a human – Hiyori.
12	"Your Voice Calls Out"; Transliteration: "Kimi no Yobu Koe" (Japanese: 君の呼ぶ声)	December 18, 2015
Ebisu explains that a Soul Call, in which a human calls out the true name of a God, can bring Bishamon and Yato back. Hiyori successfully calls out to Bishamon, bringing her back, but the Soul Call fails on Yato, meaning "Yato" is not his real name. When the Heavens Punishers come to execute Ebisu, Bishamon tries to defend him. Hiyori remembers the name she engraved on the miniature shrine and calls out Yato's real name "Yaboku", bringing a wounded Yato back. The Heavens Punishers summon a pacification ring to kill Ebisu. Yato destroys the pacification ring to protect him but another is placed on the ground, trapping Ebisu.
13	"The God of Fortune's Message"; Transliteration: "Fuku no Kami no Kotozuke" (Japanese: 福の神の言伝)	December 25, 2015
The pacification ring kills Ebisu, reincarnating him back to a child, not aware of who he was in his past life. His death and reincarnation greatly affects Yato, who tells the child Ebisu that he was a brave and selfless man in his past life. Yato wants to be more like Ebisu, doing good for humanity rather than murdering. He lets go of his past as a God of Calamity and releases Nora, vowing to have a new purpose as a God of Fortune with Yukine as his guide. An after-credits scene shows that Kouto Fujisaki, the boy who went as Hiyori's date at Capypa Land and kissed her, is actually Yato's father and has possession of Ebisu's Locution Brush.
OAD–1	"The Yatogami Serial Murder Incident ~Noragami Suspense Theatre~"; Transliteration: "Yatogami Renzoku Satsujin Jiken ~Noragami Sasupensu Gekijō" (Japanese: 夜ト神連続殺人事件 ノラガミサスペンス劇場)	November 17, 2015
Hiyori and her parents go to a ski resort where she unexpectedly meets Yato and Yukine as well as Kofuku, Daikoku, Tenjin, Kazuma, and Bishamon. A mysterious man attacks Yato but freaks out when he sees Yato hasn't died. He tries all sorts of ways to kill Yato, including poison, arrows, fire, a gun, and more. Yato tries to figure out who's killing him and successively accuses Kazuma, Bishamon, Tenjin, and many others while simultaneously revealing all his crimes against them. The man kidnaps Yato and throws him off a cliff into water. Yato, of course, survives and the man reveals that he was doing this as research for his mystery novels, since his weren't realistic. After Yato reveals he's a god, the man becomes his believer, to everyone's disbelief.
OAD–2	"A Picture Together"; Transliteration: "Issho ni Shashin o" (Japanese: 一緒に写真を)	March 17, 2016
Yato invites Hiyori to Capypa Land, much to Hiyori's horror, as that was where she was unwillingly kissed. Ebisu wanders off in Capypa Land and Bishamon and Kazuma arrive to look for him; Kofuku and Daikoku are also there, as Kofuku asked Daikoku for their first date in 20 years. Bishamon finally relaxes and she and Kazuma enjoy their time together. Yato and Hiyori watch the parade and Yato notices her sadness and tries to leave. Hiyori calls him back, saying that she wants to stay together longer. Kofuku causes a Vent, which reveals the Capypers as costumed old men. Yato is heartbroken by this, as he thought they were real. Hiyori comforts him, explaining to Yukine that she wants Yato to hold onto his dreams.

== Home media release ==
Noragami
Vol.	Episodes	Bonus disc	Release date	Ref.
1	1–2		March 23, 2014	
2	3–4		April 9, 2014	
3	5–6		May 9, 2014	
4	7–8		June 11, 2014	
5	9–10		June 9, 2014	
6	11–12		August 13, 2014	

Noragami Aragoto
Vol.	Episodes	Bonus disc	Release date	Ref.
1	1–3		February 19, 2016	
2	4–5		March 4, 2016	
3	6–7		March 25, 2016	
4	8–9		April 29, 2016	
5	10–11		May 27, 2016	
6	12–13		June 24, 2016	
