= 兆 =

兆 is East Asian character, may refer to:

- One million, one trillion or ten quadrillion in Chinese.
- Cho (조), one trillion in Korean.
- Kizashi, Japanese word which means "something great is coming", "omen", "sign", "warning" or "one trillion".
  - "Looking Back and Moving Ahead" Transcription: "A Sign" (兆): Yu-Gi-Oh! Duel Monsters (season 3) episode.
  - "Omens" (兆し), manga Berserk chapter.
  - "Signs" (兆し), manga Noragami chapter.
- Suzuki Kizashi, mid-size car.
- Triệu, one million in Vietnamese.
