= Bryn Apprill =

American voice actress (born 1996)

- Born: Bryn Catherine Apprill; January 29, 1996 (age 30); Plano, Texas, U.S.
- Education: Collin College
- Occupation: Voice actress
- Years active: 2013–present
- Website: brynapprill.com

Bryn Catherine Apprill (born January 29, 1996) is an American voice actress. Her voice acting career began when she was a high school student in 2013, and since then, she has been providing voices for a number of English-language versions of Japanese anime films and television series.

Some of her major roles include Kei Karuizawa in Classroom of the Elite, Christa Lenz / Historia Reiss in Attack on Titan, Kurumi in Hal, Meldy in Fairy Tail, Kurumi Narumi in Mikagura School Suite, Kaede in The Boy and the Beast, Awaki Musujime in A Certain Magical Index, Himeko Momokino in Citrus, Hiyori Iki in Noragami, Tenzing WangChuk in Psycho-Pass: Sinners of the System, Kobeni Higashiyama in Chainsaw Man, Hikari Takanashi in Interviews with Monster Girls, Roka Shibasaki in D-Frag!, Sumireko Hanabusa in Riddle Story of Devil, Izumiko Suzuhara in Red Data Girl, Kotori Itsuka in Date A Live, Akane Sakurada in Castle Town Dandelion, Haruna in Kancolle: Kantai Collection, San Diego in Azur Lane, Honoka Tamarai in ReLIFE, Miku in Darling in the Franxx, Yaya in Unbreakable Machine-Doll, Ibara Shiozaki in My Hero Academia, Chocola in Nekopara, Mimosa Vermillion in Black Clover, Cyan Hijirikawa in Show by Rock!!, and Natsuko Honda in King's Game The Animation.

== Personal life ==
Apprill is bisexual.

== Filmography ==
=== Film ===
List of voice performances in films
Year	Title	Role	Source
2014	Hal	Kurumi	
2014	One Piece Film: Z	Gali	
2016	The Boy and the Beast	Kaede	
2016	Strike Witches: The Movie	Heidemarie W. Schnaufer	
2017	One Piece Film: Gold	Tempo	
2019	Dragon Ball Super: Broly	Bulla, Female Saiyan A, Female Frieza Crew A	
2021	The Stranger by the Shore	Suzu	
2022	The Quintessential Quintuplets Movie	Yotsuba Nakano	
2023	Legend of Raoh: Chapter of Death in Love	Lynn	
2023	Black Clover: Sword of the Wizard King	Mimosa Vermilion	
2025	Chainsaw Man – The Movie: Reze Arc	Kobeni Higashiyama	

=== Anime ===
List of voice performances in anime
Year	Title	Role	Notes	Source
2014–2019	Fairy Tail	Meldy		
2014–2023	Attack on Titan	Christa Lenz / Historia Reiss	Also Attack on Titan: Junior High	
2014–2024	Date A Live series	Kotori Itsuka		
2014	Red Data Girl	Izumiko Suzuhara		
2014	Space Dandy	Alethia	Ep. 11	
2014	Senran Kagura	Yagyu		
2014	A Certain Magical Index II	Awaki Musujime	Also III	
2015	Death Parade	Mai Takada	Ep. 3	
2015–2018	High School DxD	Akeno Himejima	Season 3–4, As Kelly Angel	
2015	Kamisama Kiss 2	Mamoru (monkey)		
2015	Unbreakable Machine-Doll	Yaya		
2015	Absolute Duo	Julie Sigtuna		
2015–2016	Show by Rock!! series	Cyan Hijirikawa		
2015	D-Frag!	Roka Shibasaki		
2015	Seraph of the End	Mirai Kimizuki, Kiseki-O		
2015	Ninja Slayer From Animation	Dragon Yukano/Amnesia		
2015	Ultimate Otaku Teacher	Nagare Komiya		
2015	Mikagura School Suite	Kurumi Narumi		
2015	Noragami series	Hiyori Iki		
2015	The Rolling Girls	Ura Kukino	Ep. 10	
2015	Assassination Classroom	Ritsu	Also Koro Sensei Quest	
2015	Shomin Sample	Misaki Yamada	Ep. 5	
2015	Soul Eater Not!	Tsugumi Harudori		
2015	selector infected WIXOSS	Ulith	Also selector spread WIXOSS	
2015	Gangsta	Nina		
2015	Dragonar Academy	Lucca Saarinen		
2015	Riddle Story of Devil	Sumireko Hanabusa		
2015	Sky Wizards Academy	Lily Lancaster		
2015	Ladies versus Butlers!	Pina Sformklan Estoh		
2016	Dimension W	Shiora Skyheart	Eps. 1, 3	
2016	Snow White with the Red Hair	Kihal Toghrul		
2016	No-Rin	Akari Suzuki		
2016	Tokyo ESP	Amie Namuro		
2016	Grimgar of Fantasy and Ash	Mutsumi	Ep. 11	
2016	Gonna be the Twin-Tail!!	Soji Mitsuka (female)/Tail Red		
2016	First Love Monster	Kaho Nikaidō		
2016	And You Thought There Is Never a Girl Online?	Mizuki Nishimura	Ep. 6	
2016	Garo: The Animation	Laura	Ep. 20	
2016	Three Leaves, Three Colors	Kō Hayama		
2016	Orange	Misuzu Murasaka	Ep. 9	
2016	The Vision of Escaflowne	Chid Feid	Funimation dub	
2016	ReLIFE	Honoka Tamarai		
2016	Castle Town Dandelion	Akane Sakurada		
2016	The Disastrous Life of Saiki K.	Yūta Iridatsu		
2016	Joker Game	Emma Glenn	Ep. 7	
2016	Keijo!!!!!!!!	Mai Itoeda	Ep. 10	
2017	Akiba's Trip: The Animation	Niwaka Denkigai		
2017	Interviews with Monster Girls	Hikari Takanashi		
2017	Chaos;Child	Hinae Arimura		
2017	Chain Chronicle: The Light of Haecceitas	Louise		
2017	Hand Shakers	Kodama Awaza		
2017	Luck & Logic	Venus		
2017	Trickster	Sumire Nekooka		
2017	Aria the Scarlet Ammo AA	Kira		
2017	Akashic Records of Bastard Magic Instructor	Lynn Titis		
2017–2022	My Hero Academia	Ibara Shiozaki		
2017	WorldEnd: What are you doing at the end of the world? Are you busy? Will you save us?	Almaria Duffner		
2017	Tsukigakirei	Miu Imazu		
2017	Sakura Quest	Moe Sawano		
2017	The Royal Tutor	Bruno von Granzreich (young)		
2017	KanColle: Kantai Collection	Haruna		
2017	Code Geass: Akito the Exiled	Anna Clément, Alice Shiang		
2017	New Game!	Nene Sakura		
2017	Love Tyrant	Mavro		
2017	Regalia: The Three Sacred Stars	Rena Asteria		
2017–present	Classroom of the Elite	Kei Karuizawa		
2017	In Another World With My Smartphone	Arma Strand		
2017–present	One Piece	Shirahoshi		
2017	Convenience Store Boy Friends	Aki Asukai		
2017	Chronos Ruler	Lana	Ep. 6	
2017	Restaurant to Another World	Iris	Ep. 11	
2017	18if	Hanako Sumitomo		
2017	Myriad Colors Phantom World	Marchosias, Cthulhu		
2017	King's Game The Animation	Natsuko Honda		
2017	Hundred	Claudia Lowetti		
2017	The Ancient Magus' Bride	Isabel	Eps. 7–8	
2017	Konohana Kitan	Shino	Ep. 4	
2017	Dies Irae	Ren Fujii (young)	Ep. 8	
2017–2021	Black Clover	Mimosa Vermilion		
2018	Katana Maidens ~ Toji No Miko	Mai Yanase		
2018	Citrus	Himeko Momokino		
2018	Darling in the Franxx	Miku		
2018	Pop Team Epic	Sosogu Hoshifuri		
2018	Death March to the Parallel World Rhapsody	Iyuna	Ep. 6	
2018	Steins;Gate 0	Kaede Kurushima		
2018	Dragon Ball Super	Cocoa Amaguri, Bulla (baby)		
2018	Magical Girl Raising Project	Ayana Sakanagi/Swim Swim		
2018	Zombie Land Saga	Ai Mizuno		
2018	RErideD	Mage Bilstein		
2018	Radiant	Ulmina Bagliore		
2018	Concrete Revolutio series	Earth-chan		
2018	Harukana Receive	Emily Thomas		
2019	Magical Girl Spec-Ops Asuka	Sayaka Hata		
2019	Boogiepop and Others	Suiko Minahoshi	6 episodes	
2019–2021, 2023	The Quintessential Quintuplets	Yotsuba Nakano		
2019	Fairy Gone	Chima		
2019	Million Arthur	Nuckelavee		
2019	Cutie Honey Universe	Natsuko Aki		
2019	Fire Force	Mikako	Ep. 2	
2019	Kase-san	Yui Yamada		
2019	Kemono Friends	Eurasian Eagle Owl		
2019–2021	Fruits Basket	Hatori Soma (young)	Season 3	
2019	Azur Lane	San Diego		
2020	Id:Invaded	Nahoshi Inami		
2020	Nekopara	Chocola		
2020	If My Favorite Pop Idol Made It to the Budokan, I Would Die	Maina Ichii		
2020	Kaguya-sama: Love Is War	Nagisa Kashiwagi	Season 2	
2021	Mushoku Tensei: Jobless Reincarnation	Zenith Greyrat, Norn Greyrat		
2021	Combatants Will Be Dispatched!	Cristoseles Tillis Grace		
2021	The Saint's Magic Power is Omnipotent	Elizabeth Ashley		
2021	Magatsu Wahrheit Zuerst	Sissel Grauer		
2021	Kageki Shojo!!	Hijiri Nojima		
2022	Girls' Frontline	G43		
2022	The Greatest Demon Lord Is Reborn as a Typical Nobody	Ginny		
2022–2025	A Couple of Cuckoos	Sachi Umino		
2022	Aharen-san Is Indecipherable	Atsushi		
2022	Don't Hurt Me, My Healer!	Carla		
2022	Smile of the Arsnotoria the Animation	Pica		
2022	Love After World Domination	Ultimate Phantom	Ep. 12	
2022	Raven of the Inner Palace	Jiujiu		
2022	Chainsaw Man	Kobeni Higashiyama		
2022–2023	Spy × Family	Fiona Frost	Ep. 21; temporary replaced Lindsay Seidel	
2022–2023	Spy × Family	Anya Forger	Eps. 28–29; temporary replaced Megan Shipman	
2022	PuraOre! Pride of Orange	Manaka Mizusawa		
2023	Mobile Suit Gundam: The Witch from Mercury	Nika		
2023	KamiKatsu	Alural		
2023	Shy	Iko Koishikawa		
2023	Girlfriend, Girlfriend	Rika Hoshizaki	Ep. 15; temporary replaced Megan Shipman	
2024	The Demon Prince of Momochi House	Himari Momochi		
2024	Campfire Cooking in Another World with My Absurd Skill	Sui		
2024	Wind Breaker	Young Sako		
2025	I Left My A-Rank Party to Help My Former Students Reach the Dungeon Depths!	Rain		
2025	Failure Frame	Piggymaru		
2025	To Be Hero X	Moon		
2025	Cultural Exchange with a Game Centre Girl	Lily Baker		
2025–2026	The 100 Girlfriends Who Really, Really, Really, Really, Really Love You	Mimimi Utsukushisugi	Season 2 onwards	
2025–present	Beyblade X	Karla Konjiki	Season 2 onwards	
2026	You Can't Be in a Rom-Com with Your Childhood Friends!	Runa Tsukimi		
2026	Roll Over and Die	Eterna Rinebow		
2026	Witch Hat Atelier	Brushbuddy		
2026	Magic Knight Rayearth	Umi Ryuzaki		
2026	Full Clearing Another World Under a Goddess with Zero Believers	Sofia Eir Roses		

=== Video games ===
List of voice performances in video games
Year	Title	Role	Source
2014	Smite	Awilix	
2015	Dragon Ball Xenoverse	Time Patroller	
2016	Paladins	Skye	
2016	Dragon Ball Xenoverse 2	Time Patroller	
2021	Tales of Luminaria	Amelie Lawrence	
2023	Honkai: Star Rail	Qingque	
2023	Gal Guardians: Demon Purge	Kaname Nonomiya	
2023	Goddess of Victory: Nikke	Anchor	Credited in-game
2026	Zenless Zone Zero	Roxy Ifrita Pryce	
