= Jamie Marchi =

American voice actress

- Marchi at GalaxyCon Des Moines in 2026
- Born: Knoxville, Tennessee, U.S.
- Education: University of Oklahoma
- Occupations: Voice actress; ADR director; script writer
- Years active: 2000–present
- Agent: Kim Dawson Agency
- Spouse: Sean T. Perez (m. 1999; div. 2005)

Jamie Marchi (/ˈmɑːrki/) is an American voice actress, ADR director and script writer. She has provided a number of voices for English-language versions of anime and video games. She is known for her role as Masane Amaha in Witchblade, Mari Ohara in Love Live! Sunshine!!, Mimi in Rin: Daughters of Mnemosyne, Mitsuko Kongo in A Certain Scientific Railgun, Charlotte E. Yeager in Strike Witches, Haruna Saotome in Negima!, Rias Gremory in High School DxD, Panty Anarchy in the first season of Panty & Stocking with Garterbelt, Cathy in Angels of Death, and Mt. Lady in My Hero Academia.

== Early life ==
Marchi was born in Knoxville, Tennessee, to Susan Kay Hester (née Taylor, born 1951). Her stepfather, Michael Hester (1957–2016), worked as a bio-medical engineer. She graduated from the University of Oklahoma with a bachelor's degree in theater, and started her professional acting career in 2000.

== Career ==
Marchi got her start in voice acting in Fruits Basket as Motoko Minagawa, and has worked on and voiced for a number of American adaptations of Japanese anime series, which include Black Cat as Rinslet Walker, Soul Eater as Elizabeth "Liz" Thompson, Sekirei as Uzume, Heaven's Lost Property as Mikako Satsukitane, Panty & Stocking with Garterbelt as Panty Anarchy, A Certain Scientific Railgun as Mitsuko Kongo, Rin: Daughters of Mnemosyne as Mimi, Strike Witches as Charlotte E. Yeager, Freezing as Rana Linchen, High School DxD as Rias Gremory, Witchblade as Masane Amaha and Death Parade as Chiyuki. She also writes the anime dub scripts and directs other Funimation actors.

In April 2013, Marchi joined The Funimation Show web series as a co-host.

On September 3, 2015, Marchi made her debut role for Sentai Filmworks as Neko Kuroha in Brynhildr in the Darkness.

On November 3, 2017, Marchi made her first non-anime role as Green Guts in Cartoon Network's OK K.O.! Let's Be Heroes.

== Legal issues ==
On February 8, 2019, in response to the accusations of homophobia and inappropriate behavior being launched at voice actor Vic Mignogna, Marchi, along with voice actress Monica Rial, shared their own alleged experiences. Mignogna categorically denied these allegations, asserting that all interactions were consensual and lacked malicious intent. On April 19, 2019, Mignogna filed a lawsuit against Marchi, Rial, Ron Toye, and Funimation, claiming defamation and tortious interference. The lawsuit stemmed from public statements that Mignogna argued damaged his reputation. In his deposition, he described playfully touching Marchi's hair as a compliment to her haircut, denying any sexual undertones and framing interactions as friendly. He provided a detailed account, admitting to a casual, playful action but denied any misconduct. He maintained that he had no intention of causing harm. On September 6, 2019, the civil case against Marchi was dismissed based on Mignogna's status as a limited-purpose public figure, requiring a higher burden of proof for defamation. In February 2022, Marchi and Rial began a monthly podcast discussing their perspective on the defamation case.

== Personal life ==
Marchi's younger brother, Jean-Luc Hester, is also a voice actor.

Marchi married fellow actor Sean T. Perez on August 8, 1999. They divorced on November 22, 2005. She has two step-daughters.

== Filmography ==
=== Anime ===
List of voice performances in anime
Year	Series	Role	Notes	Source
2002	Fruits Basket	Motoko Minagawa	Debut role Also 2019 reboot	Press
2003	YuYu Hakusho	Juri		
2003	Dragon Ball GT	Yutoba's Daughter	Funimation dub	
2004	Kiddy Grade	Director, Tour Guide, others		
2004–09	Case Closed	Various		CA
2004	Spiral	Mother		CA
2004	Dragon Ball GT: A Hero's Legacy	Girl in Pink		CA
2004	Fullmetal Alchemist	Rick	As Jamie Perez	CA
2005	Burst Angel	Meg	First lead role Also Infinity	
2005	The Galaxy Railways	Maggie Redford		Resume
2005	Initial D	Saori	Funimation dub (Ep. 12)	
2005	Samurai 7	Warya		CA
2005	Dragon Ball Z	Ritoian Boy	Funimation dub	
2006	Baki the Grappler	Yasuko		Resume
2006	Basilisk	Young Ogen		CA
2006	Black Cat	Rinslet Walker		
2006	Desert Punk	Natsuko Kawaguchi		CA
2006	Kodocha	Ayumi		Resume
2006	Negima! series	Haruna Saotome	Also Negima!? ADR Director for Spring and Summer specials	CA
2006	Rumbling Hearts	Fumio Hoshino		CA
2006	Shin-Chan	Miss Polly	Funimation dub	CA
2006	Speed Grapher	Miss Wakaba		CA
2006	Trinity Blood	Sister Agnes		Resume
2007	Beck: Mongolian Chop Squad	Page		CA
2007	Mushishi	Matsu, Villager, Woman		CA
2007	One Piece	Miss. Valentine, others		Resume
2007	Peach Girl	Nori		Resume
2007	School Rumble series	Various		CA
2007	SoltyRei	Integra Martel		CA
2007	Suzuka	Miki Hashiba		
2007	Tsubasa: Reservoir Chronicle	Arashi Arisugaw		Resume
2007	Witchblade	Masane Amaha		
2008	Claymore	Helen		Resume
2008	Ghost Hunt	Nao Yoshimi		Resume
2008	Glass Fleet	Elvia		Resume
2008	Hell Girl	Mina Minato		Resume
2008	Jyu Oh Sei	Karim	Eps. 7–8; ADR Director	Resume
2008	Ouran High School Host Club	Chizuru Maihara		CA
2008	Sasami: Magical Girls Club	Sonoko		Resume
2008	Shuffle!	Ama Shigure		CA
2008	xxxHolic	Rin, others		CA
2009	Big Windup!	Naoe Mihashi		Resume
2009	Blassreiter	Amanda Werner		Resume
2009	D.Gray-man	Liza		Resume
2009	Darker than Black	Brita		Resume
2009	Dragonaut: The Resonance	Widow		Resume
2009	El Cazador de la Bruja	Natalia	Ep. 11	Resume
2009	Kaze no Stigma	Miracle C		Resume
2009	Nabari no Ou	Ichiki		Resume
2009	Romeo X Juliet	Ophelia		Resume
2009	Save Me! Lollipop	Ruby		Resume
2009	Sgt. Frog	Aki Hinata	Also ADR Director, ADR Script	Resume
2009	Shigurui: Death Frenzy	Sato		Resume
2009	Spice and Wolf	Chloe	Also ADR Director, ADR Script	CA
2009	The Tower of Druaga series	Fatina		Resume
2009	Chaos;Head	Seira Orgel		Resume
2010	Bamboo Blade	Carrie Nishikawa		
2010	Birdy the Mighty Decode	Hazumi Senkawa		Resume
2010	Corpse Princess	Toya		Resume
2010	Hetalia: Axis Powers	Chibitalia Narrator	Also ADR Director, ADR Script	Resume
2010	Rin: Daughters of Mnemosyne	Mimi		
2010	Sekirei series	Uzume	2 seasons	Resume
2010	Sengoku Basara: Samurai Kings series	Matsu	Also End of Judgement	Resume
2010	Soul Eater	Liz Thompson		
2010	Strike Witches series	Charlotte E. Yeager		CA
2010	Oh! Edo Rocket		ADR Script	
2011	Baka and Test series	Shoko Kirishima	ADR Script	Resume
2011	Chrome Shelled Regios	Naruki Gelni		Resume
2011–19	Fairy Tail	Cana Alberona		Resume
2011	Fullmetal Alchemist: Brotherhood	Rebecca Catalina		Resume
2011	Ga-Rei: Zero	Mei Isayama		Resume
2011–12	Heaven's Lost Property series	Mikako Satsukitane		Resume
2011	Phantom ~Requiem for the Phantom	Sanae Kubota	Eps. 9–10; ADR Script	Resume
2011	Rosario + Vampire series	Shizuka Nekonome		Resume
2011	The Sacred Blacksmith	Penelope		Resume
2012	Cat Planet Cuties	JACK		Resume
2012	Deadman Wonderland	Karako Koshio		Resume
2012–15	Freezing series	Rana Linchen		Resume
2012–18	High School DxD series	Rias Gremory	ADR Script	
2012	B Gata H Kei	Female Porn Star	Script Writer	Resume
2012	The Legend of the Legendary Heroes	Milk Callaude		Resume
2012	Ōkami-san and her Seven Companions	Sato	Ep. 2 ADR Script	Resume
2012	Panty & Stocking with Garterbelt	Panty	ADR Script	
2012	Princess Jellyfish	Shoko Inari		Resume
2012	Shangri-La	Rena	Eps. 7–8	
2012–13	Shakugan no Shana	Mare	Season 2–4	Resume
2013	A Certain Scientific Railgun series	Mitsuko Kongo		
2013	Eureka Seven: AO	Rebecka Halström		Resume
2013	Future Diary	Ai Mikami (7th)		
2013	Last Exile: Fam, the Silver Wing	Lilliana Il Grazioso Merlo Turan		
2013	Maken-ki! series	Yuka Amado		
2013	Sankarea: Undying Love	Ranko Saōji		
2013	Tenchi Muyo! War on Geminar	Mexiah Flan		Resume
2014	Attack on Titan	Anka Rheinberger		
2014	Date A Live series	Ai Yamabuki		
2014	Kamisama Kiss	Hiroko	Ep. 11; Script Writer	
2014	Laughing Under the Clouds	Nishiki		
2014	Space Dandy		ADR Writer	Press
2014	Tokyo Ghoul	Itori	also:re	
2015	Assassination Classroom	Rinka Hayami	Also Koro-sensei Q!	
2015	Death Parade	Chiyuki		
2015	Noragami	Tsuyu		
2015	Noragami Aragoto	Tsuyu		
2015	Free! – Eternal Summer	Gou Matsuoka		
2015	The Rolling Girls	Kuniko Shigyo		
2015	Yona of the Dawn	Yuri	Eps. 21–23	
2015	Yurikuma Arashi	Lulu Yurigasaki	ADR Script Writer	
2015	Wanna Be the Strongest in the World	Ryo Nishihara		
2015	Danganronpa: The Animation	Junko Enoshima		
2015	Soul Eater Not!	Liz Thompson		
2015	Mikagura School Suite	Seisa Mikagura	ADR Writer	
2015	Ultimate Otaku Teacher	Miho Kitou		
2015	selector infected WIXOSS	Akira Aoi	Also selector spread WIXOSS	
2015	Brynhildr in the Darkness	Neko Kuroha	Sentai Filmworks debut	
2015	Gangsta.	Ginger		
2015	Riddle Story of Devil	Isuke Inukai		
2016	Snow White with the Red Hair	Kiki Seiran		
2016	Terror in Resonance	Five	ADR Script Writer	
2016	Brothers Conflict	Miwa Asahina		
2016	Grimgar of Fantasy and Ash	Barbara		
2016	Divine Gate	Tristan		
2016	Black Butler: Book of Murder	Irene Diaz		
2016	Tokyo ESP	Pelico		
2016	Dimension W	Seira Yurizaki	Eps. 2, 7, 12	
2016	First Love Monster		ADR Script Writer	
2016	Love Live! Sunshine!!	Mari Ohara		
2016	Shimoneta	Ayame Kajou		
2016	Puzzle & Dragons X	Herriot	Eps. 6–7	
2016	Danganronpa 3: The End of Hope's Peak High School	Junko Enoshima		
2016	Aquarion Logos	Ranko Uminagi		
2016	Chaos Dragon	Gakushō		
2016	Orange		Script Writer	
2016	Keijo!!!!!!!!	Nagisa Ujibe		
2016	Trickster	Nao Nakamura		
2016	The Disastrous Life of Saiki K.	Kusuko Saiki (Female Form)		
2016	Alderamin on the Sky	Nanaqu Dal		
2016–24	My Hero Academia	Mount Lady		
2017	Interviews with Monster Girls	Himari Takanashi		
2017	Amagi Brilliant Park	Additional Voices		
2017	Miss Kobayashi's Dragon Maid	Lucoa / Quetzalcoatl		
2017	Chain Chronicle: The Light of Haecceitas	Selene		
2017	Valkyrie Drive: Mermaid	Lady J		
2017	ACCA: 13-Territory Inspection Dept.	Larus	Ep. 7	
2017	WorldEnd	Nygglatho	Script Writer	
2017	Tsukigakirei	Ryōko Sonoda		
2017	Alice & Zouroku	Mrs. Shikishima	Ep. 8	
2017	Code Geass: Akito the Exiled	Maria Shiang		
2017	KanColle: Kantai Collection	Takao		
2017	Sakura Quest	Kiyomi Hīragi	Ep. 10	
2017	Restaurant to Another World	Narrator	Script Writer	
2017	Space Patrol Luluco	Midori		
2017	My First Girlfriend Is a Gal	Yukana Yame		
2017–present	Classroom of the Elite	Mio Ibuki		
2017	Taboo Tattoo	Lisa Lovelock		
2017	In Another World With My Smartphone	Goddess of Love	Ep. 12	
2017	Anime-Gataris	Tsubaki Akabane		
2017	A Sister's All You Need	Nayuta Kani		
2017	Code: Realize − Guardian of Rebirth	Guinevere	Ep. 8	
2017	Garo: Vanishing Line	Natalia	Ep. 11	
2018	Pop Team Epic	Pipimi	Ep. 3a	
2018	Death March to the Parallel World Rhapsody	Ohna		
2018	Angels of Death	Cathy Ward		
2018	Dragon Ball Super	Marcarita		
2018	Space Battleship Tiramisu	Shigeruko Honda		
2018	Senran Kagura: Shinovi Master	Naraku		
2018	Harukana Receive	Marissa Thomas		
2018	That Time I Got Reincarnated as a Slime	Treyni		
2018	Conception	Reone		
2018	Cardcaptor Sakura: Clear Card	Fuutie Li		
2019	Azur Lane	Furutaka		
2019	My Roommate is a Cat	Tora		
2019	Cop Craft	Jamie Austin		
2019	Cautious Hero: The Hero Is Overpowered but Overly Cautious	Ristarte		
2019–present	Radiant	Lieselotte		
2020	Arte	Ruthanna	Ep. 7	
2020	Plunderer	Yi Yan Shallow	Ep. 20	
2021	Mushoku Tensei	Kishirika Kishirisu		
2022	Gekidol	Tomoko Hinata		
2022	The Slime Diaries: That Time I Got Reincarnated as a Slime	Treyni		
2022	Life with an Ordinary Guy Who Reincarnated into a Total Fantasy Knockout	Goddess of Love and Beauty		
2024	Fairy Tail: 100 Years Quest	Cana Alberona		

=== Animation ===
List of voice performances in animation
Year	Title	Role	Notes	Source
2017	OK K.O.! Let's Be Heroes	Green Guts	Ep. "Back in Red Action"	

=== Films ===
List of voice performances in direct-to-video, feature and television films
Year	Series	Role	Notes	Source
2004	Dragon Ball Z: Bojack Unbound	Lotta Cash		CA
2011	Heaven's Lost Property the Movie: The Angeloid of Clockwork	Mikako Satsukitane		Resume
2012	Mass Effect: Paragon Lost	Liara T'Soni		Facebook
2012	Fafner in the Azure: Heaven and Earth	Rina Nishio		
2013	Wolf Children	Mrs. Hotta		
2014	As the God's will	Hanako		
2016	Harmony	Tuan Kirie		

=== Video games ===
List of voice performances in video games
Year	Title	Role	Notes	Source
2008	Iron Chef America: Supreme Cuisine	Sharon Shu		
2011	Orcs Must Die	The Elemental Weaver		Resume
2011	The Gunstringer			Resume
2012	SMITE	Freya		
2013	The Walking Dead: Survival Instinct	Sheila, Shelley		
2012	Borderlands 2	Ellie, Rox Shepard, Sam		
2014	Borderlands: The Pre-Sequel!	Doctor Spara, Ghostly Apparition		
2016	Dragon Ball Xenoverse 2	Time Patroller Female (Voice 11)		
2017	Orcs Must Die! Unchained	Midnight		
2019	Borderlands 3	Ellie		
2021	Tales of Luminaria	Vanessa Morax		

== Awards and nominations ==
Year	Award	Category	Role	Result
2011	1st Annual Behind the Voice Actors (BTVA) Voice Acting Awards	Best Female Vocal Performance in an Anime Title in a Supporting Role	Mikako Satsukitane (Heaven's Lost Property)	Won
2012	1st Annual BTVA Anime Dub Awards	Voice Actress of the Year	—	Won
2012	1st Annual BTVA Anime Dub Awards	Best Female Supporting Vocal Performance in an Anime Television Series/OVA	Uzume (Sekirei: Pure Engagement)	Won
2012	1st Annual BTVA Anime Dub Awards	Best Female Lead Vocal Performance in an Anime Television Series/OVA	Panty (Panty & Stocking with Garterbelt)	Nominated (Note: Marchi was voted the People's Choice (subscriber's poll) for this award.)
2012	2nd Annual BTVA Voice Acting Awards	Best New Vocal Interpretation of an Established Character	Dr. Liara T'Soni (Mass Effect: Paragon Lost)	Nominated
2013	2nd Annual BTVA Anime Dub Awards	Voice Actress of the Year	—	Nominated
2013	2nd Annual BTVA Anime Dub Awards	Best Female Lead Vocal Performance in an Anime Television Series/OVA	Rias Gremory (High School DxD)	Won
2014	3rd Annual BTVA Anime Dub Awards	Voice Actress of the Year	—	Nominated
2014	3rd Annual BTVA Anime Dub Awards	Best Female Supporting Vocal Performance in an Anime Television Series/OVA	Cana Alberona (Fairy Tail)	Won
2015	4th Annual BTVA Anime Dub Awards	Voice Actress of the Year	—	Nominated
2015	4th Annual BTVA Anime Dub Awards	Best Female Lead Vocal Performance in an Anime Television Series/OVA	Chiyuki (Death Parade)	Nominated
2016	5th Annual BTVA Anime Dub Awards	Voice Actress of the Year	—	Nominated
2016	5th Annual BTVA Anime Dub Awards	Best Female Lead Vocal Performance in an Anime Television Series/OVA	Ayame Kajo (Shimoneta)	Nominated
2016	5th Annual BTVA Anime Dub Awards	Best Female Supporting Vocal Performance in an Anime Television Series/OVA	Five (Terror in Resonance)	Nominated
2016	5th Annual BTVA Anime Dub Awards	Best Female Lead Vocal Performance in an Anime Movie/Special	Tuan Kirie (Harmony)	Won
2017	6th Annual BTVA Anime Dub Awards	Voice Actress of the Year	—	Nominated
2017	6th Annual BTVA Anime Dub Awards	Best Female Supporting Vocal Performance in an Anime Television Series/OVA	Nygglatho (WorldEnd)	Nominated
