= List of Noragami chapters =

First tankōbon volume cover, released by Kodansha on July 15, 2011

Noragami is a Japanese manga series written and illustrated by the manga artist duo Adachitoka. It was serialized in Kodansha's Monthly Shōnen Magazine from December 6, 2010, to January 6, 2024. The story follows the god Yato, and his encounter with society. Kodansha collected its chapters into 27 individual tankōbon volumes, released from July 15, 2011, to February 16, 2024. A non-serialized collection of short side stories, titled Noragami: Stray Stories, was released on November 15, 2013. Two other volumes were released as add-on to the limited editions of volume 20 and 24 on February 15, 2019, and October 15, 2021, respectively.

In North America, the manga was licensed for English release by Kodansha USA in 2014. The 27 volumes were released from September 2, 2014, to December 10, 2024. Noragami: Stray Stories was released on December 1, 2015. Kodansha USA started releasing the series in a three-in-one volume omnibus edition, with the first volume released on September 13, 2022. The ninth and last volume (consisting of the original volumes 25–27) was released on August 19, 2025.

For the 50th anniversary of Monthly Shōnen Magazine, a 14-volume shinsōban edition of Noragami was released from December 17, 2024, to July 16, 2025.

== Volumes ==
No.	Original release date	Original ISBN	English release date	English ISBN
1	July 15, 2011	978-4-06-371294-0	September 2, 2014	978-1-61-262906-3
01. "The Man in the Sweatsuit" (ジャージのひと, Jāji no Hito); 02. "The House Cat, the Stray God and the Tail" (家猫と野良神と尻尾, Ieneko to Noragami to Shippo); 03. "Like Snow" (雪のような, Yuki no Yōna)
A poor god named Yato answers a five-yen prayer from a young girl bullied by her classmates. Using the power of his Regalia, Tomone, a spirit that can transform into a Divine Weapon, Yato destroys the evil spirit that has been stressing the student. Tomone quits, tired of Yato's poverty, and Yato takes up a new request to find a missing cat. A girl named Hiyori Iki tries to save him from an oncoming bus but is hit by the bus herself. She becomes a half-phantom and asks Yato for help on returning to normal. Yato finds the spirit of a young boy and makes him his new sword Regalia, naming him Yukine.
2	October 17, 2011	978-4-06-371308-4	November 18, 2014	978-1-61-262907-0
04. "A Few Godly Perspectives" (幾つかの神慮, Ikutsuka no Shinryo); 05. "Borderline" (境界線, Kyōkaisen); 06. "Be Afraid" (コワイヒト, Kowai Hito); 07. "Benighted" (誰そ彼, Dare so Kare)
Yato introduces Hiyori and Yukine to Tenjin, the god of academics, and becomes shocked at the revelation that Tomone joined Tenjin under the new name of Mayu. When Yukine starts stealing and committing sinful acts, Yato suffers internal injuries. He and Hiyori meet the deceased spirit of a young girl and escape when it becomes a phantom. Yato introduces Hiyori and Yukine to the god of poverty, Kofuku, and her Regalia Daikoku. On their way back, Yato and Yukine are attacked by the god of combat Bishamonten who has a personal vendetta with Yato. As they try to escape, they are saved by Kofuku. Yato then meets the Regalia Nora.
3	February 17, 2012	978-4-06-371323-7	January 20, 2015	978-1-61-262908-7
08. "Strays on a Stormy Night" (時化る日のノラたち, Shikeru Hi no Noratachi); 09. "Abominable Creature" (忌むべき者, Imubeki Mono); 10. "Crossing the Line" (一線を越えて, Issen o Koete); 11. "A Name" (名前, Namae)
Nora is revealed to be Yato's former Regalia, trying to convince him to let go of Yukine and use her again. Yato decides to stay with Yukine, despite his sins. Hiyori meets one of Bishamon's Regalia, Kazuma, who is indebted to Yato. Due to Yukine's sinful acts, Yato collapses near death. Hiyori rushes him to Kofuku's place, and Daikoku, Kazuma and Mayu hold an ablution for Yukine to punish him. Due to Yato and Hiyori's encouragements, Yukine apologizes for his sins, saving Yato.
4	June 15, 2012	978-4-06-371336-7	April 28, 2015	978-1-61-262994-0
12. "To Cut, or Not to Cut" (きる、きらない, Kiru, Kiranai); 13. "Signs" (兆し, Kizashi); 14. "Her Memories" (彼女の思い出, Kanojo no Omoide); 15. "That Which Withers Away" (枯れゆくもの, Kare Yuku Mono)
5	October 17, 2012	978-4-06-371350-3	June 23, 2015	978-1-61-262995-7
16. "Hell" (地獄, Jigoku); 17. "In Search of a Place to Go" (寄る辺を求めて, Yorube o Motomete); 18. "Drawn Swords" (抜き身, Nuki Mi); 19. "Prayer" (願, Negai)
6	February 15, 2013	978-4-06-371366-4	August 18, 2015	978-1-61-262996-4
20. "Prayerful Oath" (神祝き、呪きき, Kamuhosaki, Hosakiki); 21. "Don't Go—Stay with Me" (消えないで、傍にいて, Kienai de, Soba ni Ite); 22. "What Must Be Done" (為すべきこと, Nasubeki Koto); 23. "Guiding Light" (道標, Michishirube)
7	June 17, 2013	978-4-06-371379-4	October 13, 2015	978-1-63-236102-8
24. "Always" (ずっと一, Zuttou); 25. "When Sleeping Gods Are Provoked" (触った神の祟り, Sawatta Kami no Tatari); 26. "How to Worship a God" (神様の祀リ方, Kamisama no Matsuri Kata); 27. "Do and Due" (業と業, Gyō to Gō)
8	October 17, 2013	978-4-06-371394-7	November 17, 2015	978-1-63-236103-5
28. "God of Calamity" (禍津神, Magatsukami); 29. "The Three Affairs of Three Realms" (三つの国の諸事情, Mittsu no Kuni no Sho Jijō); 30. "The Sound of Thread Snapping" (糸の切れる音, Ito no Kireru Oto); 31. "Like Parent, Like Child" (親なり、子なり, Oya Nari, Konari)
9	December 17, 2013	978-4-06-371402-9; 978-4-06-358478-3 (LE)	December 22, 2015	978-1-63-236128-8
32. "She Who Invites" (誘な女, Izanami); 33. "Wielder of an Iron Will" (イシ椎い持ち, Ishi Tsutsui Mochi); 34. "Such Were Their Desires" (斯く在りし望み, Kaku Arishi Nozomi); 35. "Death" (死, Shi)
10	February 17, 2014	978-4-06-371412-8; 978-4-06-358479-0 (LE)	January 28, 2016	978-1-63-236213-1
36. "Binding Curse" (呪縛, Jubaku); 37. "The Sound of You Calling My Name" (君の呼ぶ声, Kimi no Yobu Koe); 38. "Because I Promised" (約束したから, Yakusoku Shitakara); 39. "Until Now and From Now On" (コレマデとコレカラ, Koremade to Korekara)
11	July 17, 2014	978-4-06-371430-2; 978-4-06-358480-6 (LE)	February 23, 2016	978-1-63-236252-0
40. "We Not-So-Humbly Pray" (恐み恐みも白さず, Kashikomi Kashikomi mo Mōsazu); 41. "A Picture Together" (一緒に写真を, Issho ni Shashin wo); 42. "Causes Nothing but Disaster" (厄災しか起こせない, Yakusai Shika Okosenai); 43. "Secrets" (秘め事, Himegoto)
12	November 17, 2014	978-4-06-371448-7	March 24, 2016	978-1-63-236253-7
44. "Cut + Ties" (斬り+結ぶ, Kiri + Musubu); 45. "Transpired Transgressions" (触れにし経ること, Fure ni Shi Furu Koto); 46. "Children at Play" (わらわあそび, Warawa Asobi); 47. "Taboo" (禁忌, Kinki)
13	April 17, 2015	978-4-06-371460-9	April 19, 2016	978-1-63-236254-4
48. "You, My Dear One" (わたしの好きなアナタ, Watashi no Suki na Anata); 49. "Fight Without Quarter" (撃ちてし止まむ, Uchiteshi Yamamu); 50. "Time of Confrontation" (向き合うとき, Mukiau Toki); 51. "Salvation" (救い, Sukui)
14	September 17, 2015	978-4-06-371483-8	May 17, 2016	978-1-63-236255-1
52. "The Near Shore and The Far Shore" (彼岸と此岸, Higan to Shigan); 53. "Similar Somehow" (どこか似ている, Dokoka Nite Iru); 54. "That Which is Seen, That Which Approaches" (見えるもの、やって来るもの, Mieru Mono, Yattekuru Mono); 55. "Cut × Off" (斬りx捨てる, Kiri x Suteru)
15	November 17, 2015	978-4-06-371494-4	June 21, 2016	978-1-63-236256-8
56. "Persuasion" (言趣け, Gen-Omomuki Ke); 57. "Where Loyalties Lie" (忠の行き先, Chū no Ikisaki); 58. "Messy Entanglements, Crossed Signals" (絡みあい、すれ違う, Karamiai, Surechigau); 59. "The Disobedient Ones" (まつろわぬ者, Matsuro Wanu Mono)
16	March 17, 2016	978-4-06-392515-9	July 19, 2016	978-1-63-236257-5
60. "What the Heavens Bring About" (天の為すこと, Ten no Nasu Koto); 61. "Renegrade" (叛徒, Hanto); 62. "Pride, Collide, Untied" (鉾、誇り、綻び, Hoko, Hokori, Hokorobi); 63. "Ecstasy" (愉悦, Yuetsu)
17	July 15, 2016	978-4-06-392531-9	October 25, 2016	978-1-63-236301-5
64. "Dear One" (いとしきひとよ, Itoshiki Hito Yo); 65. "Golden Days" (カ日, Kanichi); 66. "Smoldering Sparks" (埋み火, Uzumibi); 67. "Mine" (己がもの, Onore ga Mono)
18	February 17, 2017	978-4-06-392567-8	June 6, 2017	978-1-63-236345-9
68. "The Road Home" (家路, Ieji); 69. "Shinki" (神器, Shinki); 70. "On High" (上, Jō); 71. "Lives at Stake" (いのち賭して, Inochi to Shite)
19	August 17, 2018	978-4-06-392587-6	December 11, 2018	978-1-63-236439-5
72. "Not" (不, Zu); 73. "If You Hear a Scream" (悲鳴が聞こえたら, Himei ga Kikoetara); 74. "Gift" (おくりもの, Okurimono); 75. "And Then He..." (そうして彼は—, Sōshite Kare Wa—)
20	February 15, 2019	978-4-06-514491-6; 978-4-06-514492-3 (LE)	June 11, 2019	978-1-63-236504-0
76. "Indispensable" (捨てらわめ, Sute ra Wame); 77. "Dispensable" (捨てらわる, Sute ra Waru); 78. "Object of Desire" (欲しいもの, Hoshīmono); 79. "Near Love, Far Love" (彼の愛、此の愛, Kare no Ai, Kono Ai)
21	October 17, 2019	978-4-06-517367-1	March 10, 2020	978-1-63-236849-2
80. "Inciteful" (てとの端, Koto no wa); 81. "Alone" (ひとり, Hitori); 82. "Time To Move Forward" (前へ進む秋, Mae e Susumu Toki); 83. "A World in Shambles" (裂ける世界, Sakeru Sekai)
22	June 17, 2020	978-4-06-519753-0	November 24, 2020	978-1-63-236991-8
84. "Stray" (野良, Nora); 85. "Missing You" (会いたい, Aitai); 86. "Box" (箱, Hako); 87. "The Way to Darkness" (闇に至る途, Yami ni Itaru to)
23	February 17, 2021	978-4-06-522100-6	November 9, 2021	978-1-64-651234-8
88. "Motive" (理由, Riyū); 89. "Echoes of the Koto no Ha" (言の葉の響き, Koto no Ha no Hibiki); 90. "I have to see you" (会わなくちゃ, Awanakucha); 91. "To do the right thing" (正しいことを, Tadashī koto o)
24	October 15, 2021	978-4-06-524859-1; 978-4-06-523373-3 (LE)	July 5, 2022	978-1-64-651425-0
92. "When Dawn Comes..." (夜明けは, Yoake wa); 93. "Objective" (むく先, Muku saki); 94. "Hope" (希望, Kibō); 95. "Encircling Net" (包囲網, Hōimō)
25	June 16, 2022	978-4-06-527772-0	January 10, 2023	978-1-64-651584-4
96. "Call My Name" (名前を呼んで, Namae o Yonde); 97. "Saviour" (救主, Sukuinushi); 98. "Natural Law" (理, Kotowari); 99. "Haru and Yuki" (ハルと雪, Haru to Yuki)
26	February 16, 2023	978-4-06-530535-5	September 5, 2023	978-1-64-651713-8
100. "Snow That Dances in the Springtime" (春に舞う雪, Haru ni Mau Yuki); 101. "For Whom..." (誰がために, Ta ga tame ni); 102. "Lifeline" (命綱, Inochiduna); 103. "Reminiscence" (追憶, Tsuioku)
27	February 16, 2024	978-4-06-534201-5	December 10, 2024	979-8-88-877059-7
104. "A New Land" (国, Kuni); 105. "Worlds with no Rift" (狭間なき世, Hazamanaki Yo); 106. "Looking for Something" (さがしもの, Sagashimono); 107. "White" (白, Shiro); 108. "Yatogami" (夜ト神); 109. "With the Sweatsuit God" (ジャージの神かみと, Jyaaji no Kami to)

=== Omnibus edition ===
No.	Release date	ISBN	Collects
1	September 13, 2022	978-1-64651-555-4	Volumes 1–3
2	November 1, 2022	978-1-64651-556-1	Volumes 4–6
3	January 24, 2023	978-1-64651-557-8	Volumes 7–9
4	March 21, 2023	978-1-64651-558-5	Volumes 10–12
5	May 2, 2023	978-1-64651-559-2	Volumes 13–15
6	July 4, 2023	978-1-64651-712-1	Volumes 16–18
7	September 5, 2023	978-1-64651-902-6	Volumes 19–21
8	November 7, 2023	978-1-64651-903-3	Volumes 22–24
9	August 19, 2025	979-8-88877-312-3	Volumes 25–27

=== Shinsōban edition ===
No.	Japanese release date	Japanese ISBN
1	December 17, 2024	978-4-06-538153-3
Chapters 1–7
2	January 17, 2025	978-4-06-538214-1
Chapters 8–15
3	January 17, 2025	978-4-06-538213-4
Chapters 16–23
4	February 17, 2025	978-4-06-538206-6
Chapters 24–31
5	February 17, 2025	978-4-06-538207-3
Chapters 32–39
6	March 17, 2025	978-4-06-538208-0
Chapters 40–47
7	March 17, 2025	978-4-06-538207-3
Chapters 48–55
8	April 16, 2025	978-4-06-538219-6
Chapters 56–63
9	April 16, 2025	978-4-06-538215-8
Chapters 64–71
10	May 16, 2025	978-4-06-538209-7
Chapters 72–79
11	May 16, 2025	978-4-06-538211-0
Chapters 80–87
12	June 17, 2025	978-4-06-538212-7
Chapters 88–95
13	June 17, 2025	978-4-06-538217-2
Chapters 96–103
14	July 16, 2025	978-4-06-538216-5
Chapters 104–109; Noragami: Stray Stories 1–3

== Noragami: Stray Stories ==
No.	Original release date	Original ISBN	English release date	English ISBN
1	November 15, 2013	978-4-06-371398-5	December 1, 2015	978-1-63-236279-7
"A Story of a Fallen Man" (落ちる男の事, Ochiru Otoko no Koto); "A Story of Exploring the Mind of a Shinki" (神器の心中を問う事, Shinki no Shinchuu o Tou Koto); "A Story of Mutual Deception" (騙し合いの事, Damashi Ai no Koto); "A Story of Doing Business by Whatever Means Necessary" (手段を選ばず商う事, Shudan o Erabazu Akinau Koto); "A Story of the Other Side of the Screen" (画面の向こうの事, Gamen no Mukou no Koto); "A Story of Conforming to Temporary Stereotypes" (一時の定型に沿う事, Nijikan no Teikei ni Sou Koto); "A Story of a Nameless God Making his Way Up in the World" (無名神が這い上がる事, Mumei Shin ga Hai Agaru Koto)
2	February 15, 2019 (Note: Released as an add-on to the limited edition of the 20th volume of Noragami.)	978-4-06-514492-3	—	—
"The 4 Corners of Heaven" (四し角かくい天てん国ごくの中なきの事こと, Shikakui Tengoku no Naka no Koto); "Uncluttered Human Life" (詰つんでない人じん生せいの事こと, Tsundenai Jinsei no Koto); "About the Person who Sends the Gift" (贈おくってくれるひとの事こと, Okutte Kureru Hito no Koto)
3	October 15, 2021 (Note: Released as an add-on to the limited edition of the 24th volume of Noragami.)	978-4-06-523373-3	—	—
"The God of Calamity (Part 1)" (アワセ禍カ神ガミ (前ぜん編ぺん), Awase Kagami (Zenpen)); "The God of Calamity (Part 2)" (アワセ禍カ神ガミ (後こう編へん), Awase Kagami (Kōhen)); "Beside the Crimson Stain" (紅クレナイの傍そばに, Kurenai no Soba Ni)
