= Tokashiki =

Tokashiki may refer to:

- Tokashiki, Okinawa, an island located in Shimajiri district, Okinawa, Japan

== People with the surname ==
- Tokashiki (とかしき), a member of the manga artist duo Adachitoka
- Katsuo Tokashiki (渡嘉敷 勝男, born 1960), former WBA Light flyweight champion
- Ramu Tokashiki (渡嘉敷 来夢, born 1991), Japanese women's basketball player
