= Hiyori =

- Gender: Female

Origin
- Origin: Japanese
- Meaning: Different meanings depending on the kanji used

Hiyori (written: ひより or 日和) is a feminine Japanese given name. Notable people with the name include:

- Hiyori Kon (今 日和; born 1997), Japanese amateur sumo wrestler
- Hiyori Kono (河野 ひより; born 1998), Japanese voice actress
- Hiyori Nitta (新田 ひより; born 1997), Japanese voice actress
- Hiyori Sakurada (桜田 ひより; born 2002), Japanese actress

== Fictional characters ==
- Hiyori Hayama (葉山 陽和), a main character in the anime series Extreme Hearts
- Hiyori Iki (壱岐 ひより), a character in the manga series Noragami
- Hiyori Kazane (風音 日和), a character in the anime film Heaven's Lost Property the Movie: The Angeloid of Clockwork
- Hiyori Nishiyama (西山 ひより), a character in the manga series Hiyokoi
- Hiyori Sarugaki (猿柿 ひよ里), a character in the manga series Bleach
- Hiyori Tamura (田村 ひより), a character in the manga series Lucky Star
- Hiyori Tsuchinaga (槌永 ヒヨリ), a character in the role-playing video game Blue Archive
- Hiyori Kozuki (光月日和), a character in the manga series One Piece
- Hiyori Tomoe (巴 日和), a male character in the game and anime Ensemble Stars!
