= Tadashi Kawashima =

Japanese manga artist

Tadashi Kawashima (河島 正, Kawashima Tadashi) (April 7, 1969 – June 15, 2010) was a Japanese manga artist and writer from Ehime Prefecture. He is best known for writing the manga Alive: The Final Evolution.

== Career ==
Kawashima made his professional debut with Daughter Maker, which ran in Kōdansha's Monthly Shōnen Magazine Zōkan Great. From October 2003 to October 2009, Kawashima collaborated with Adachitoka to create Alive -Saishū Shinkateki Shōnen-, which was published in Kōdansha's Monthly Shōnen Magazine. Kawashima succumbed to liver cancer on June 15, 2010, and died at the age of 41, having finished Alive on his deathbed.

== Bibliography ==
- Daughter Maker (2000–2001 Kodansha)
- Alive: The Final Evolution (アライブ 最終進化的少年, Alive -Saishū Shinkateki Shōnen-, lit. Alive: Last Evolutionary Boy) (2003–2010 Kodansha); English translation: 2008—2017 Del Rey Manga, later Kodansha USA
