= List of Noragami characters =

The three main characters from the series: Yato (back), Hiyori Iki (left) and Yukine (right)

The Japanese manga series Noragami features an extensive cast of characters created by the manga artist duo Adachitoka.

== Main characters ==
Yato (夜卜, Yatō)
Voiced by: Hiroshi Kamiya (Japanese); Jason Liebrecht (English)
Yato is a stray god who aspires to build his own shrine. Once known as a god of calamity (禍津神, magatsukami), he now operates as a "delivery god" (デリバリーゴッド, deribarī goddo), offering assistance for five yen, the typical offering at Japanese shrines. He wears a tracksuit and scarf, refers to himself as "Yatogami", and leaves his contact information in public places. He struggles with athazagoraphobia—the fear of being forgotten—after abandoning his violent past. His closest companions are Hiyori, a human girl, and Yukine, his current Shinki, whom he treats like family. Kofuku, the God of Poverty, also supports him. Originally named Yaboku (夜卜), he adopted "Yato" (夜卜) after a Shinki misread his name. Though once a ruthless warrior, he rejects his former ways.
Hiyori Iki (壱岐 ひより, Iki Hiyori)
Voiced by: Maaya Uchida (Japanese); Bryn Apprill (English)
Hiyori Iki is a human girl who begins as a middle school student and later enters high school. After rescuing Yato from a bus accident, she becomes a Half-Phantom, her soul frequently leaving her body involuntarily. Trapped between the human world and the afterlife, she seeks Yato's help to reverse her condition. Over time, she grows deeply attached to him, even recognizing him by scent. Though cutting her spiritual ties to Yato would restore her to normal, she refuses, unwilling to forget him. Her jealousy surfaces when he nearly kisses Bishamon, the God of War, suggesting romantic feelings. She also forms a sisterly bond with Yukine, tutoring him when he wishes to study.
Yukine (雪音)
Voiced by: Yuki Kaji (Japanese); Micah Solusod (English)
Yukine is Yato's Shinki, known as "Sekki" (雪器), and takes the form of a katana. Having died young, he struggles with resentment over missing a normal human life. His actions directly affect Yato—whenever Yukine sins, Yato is physically harmed. Though he often acts disrespectfully, he deeply respects Yato, who alone knows the tragic circumstances of Yukine's past. This unresolved pain causes Yukine to battle inner turmoil, at times harming both himself and Yato. After Hiyori intervenes and he undergoes ablution, he grows fiercely loyal, striving to become a worthy Shinki. Like Yato, he cherishes Hiyori and fears being forgotten by her. His devotion is ultimately proven when he evolves into a Blessed Vessel, manifesting as twin katanas to save Yato from death.

== Gods ==
Gods in Noragami are divine beings who embody various aspects of existence such as war and poverty. They grant human wishes in exchange for prayers and offerings, and their continued existence depends on human faith. When killed, gods with shrines do not truly perish but are instead reborn, typically beginning as children before regaining their original forms.

Tenjin (天神)
Voiced by: Tōru Ōkawa (Japanese); Sean Hennigan (English)
He is the god of academics. He has several Shinki and has his own shrine (where Yato often passes the night), much to Yato's envy. He sometimes assumes human form to intervene if Yato goes out of control playing around. Initially, his Shinki were Mayu, Tsuyu, Ayu, Nayu, Miyu and Moyu, but Miyu is cast out and exiled after becoming corrupted by Yukine's darkness and Tsuyu was (temporarily) murdered by the heavens in a trial against Yato.
Kofuku (小福)
Voiced by: Aki Toyosaki (Japanese); Alexis Tipton (English)
She is a god of poverty (貧乏神, binbōgami), posing as Ebisu. She is energetic and gentle, but can be fierce and stands up to even Bishamonten if needed. Her Shinki is Daikoku. Later, Kofuku and Daikoku take Yato and Yukine in, allowing them to live at their temple.
Bishamonten (毘沙門天, Bishamonten)
Voiced by: Miyuki Sawashiro (Japanese); Elizabeth Maxwell (English)
Bishamon (also called Veena) is the god of combat, depicted as a woman with long blonde hair. Unable to abandon spirits attacked by Phantoms, she accumulates many Shinki, though managing them becomes difficult. She harbors deep hatred for Yato after he slaughtered her previous Shinki clan, though it is later revealed he did so at Kazuma's request to save her life—a truth that ends her pursuit of him, though their relationship remains contentious. Her Shinki reside in her lavish home, with Kazuma, Akiha, Karuha, Kazuha, Kinuha, Tsuguha, and Yugiha serving as her most frequently used weapons. Suzuha befriends Yukine, while Kugaha orchestrates his death and corrupts Aiha, leading to many Shinki being consumed by a Phantom. After revoking Kugaha for his betrayal, Bishamon saves Aiha through ablution.
Rabō (蠃蚌, Rabō)
Voiced by: Takahiro Sakurai (Japanese); Mike McFarland (English)
Rabō is a mysterious figure who primarily appears in the anime, with a brief appearance in the manga special "Awase Kagami". A god of calamity like Yato, he can control Phantoms and frequently interacts with Nora. Having once worked alongside Yato, Rabō seeks to restore him to his former violent nature. His indiscriminate nature leads him to kill humans, Shinki, gods, and Phantoms alike, fulfilling any wish requested of him. After being defeated by Yato, it becomes apparent that Rabō may have wanted Yato—his fellow calamity god—to end his life.
Ebisu (恵比寿)
Voiced by: Ryōtarō Okiayu (Japanese); John Burgmeier (English)
A god of wealth and one of the Seven Gods of Fortune, who offers to buy Yukine from Yato after he becomes a Blessed Vessel, or even use him as a Nora. He dresses like a businessman, and is rather harsh with his words. Unlike most gods, he has no problems with using Nora. Having been abandoned by his mother Izanami, he views himself as an outcast, and thus sympathizes with them. He plans to use Phantoms as Shinki, and his constant failures in that cause him to reincarnate frequently.
Ōkuninushi (大国主, Ōkuninushi)
Voiced by: Shunsuke Sakuya (Japanese); Bryan Massey (English)
An Earthly god and another of the Seven Gods of Fortune, who also goes by the name of Daikokuten (大黒天). He is a close friend of both Bishamonten and Ebisu. He appears as a big and gruff man with blonde hair who is constantly wearing sunglasses, combined with traditional Japanese clothes. Despite his appearance, however, he is very friendly and fond of rabbits. He is capable of turning into a monstrous spider and is said to be so dangerous even without a Shinki that he was once sealed.

== Shinki ==
A Shinki (神器; called "Regalia" in the anime's English dub) is a divine weapon possessed by gods. They are former humans that died for a reason against their will (e.g. not through suicide). Shinki change their shape into a unique weapon when their gods called their Shinki name. Usually, each god has a naming scheme to serve as proof that the god wants a specific type of Shinki, and also as an affirmation of a familial bond. Certain Shinki will evolve after they risk their name to protect their gods into a better shape, which is called a "Blessed Vessel" (祝の器, hafuri no utsuwa).

Mayu (真喩)
Voiced by: Asami Imai (Japanese); Leah Clark (English)
She is Yato's former Shinki, and currently one of Tenjin's Shinki. Despite her harsh attitude toward Yato, she does appear to hold a considerable amount of respect and concern for him. An example of this is when she volunteers to be a part of the ablution required to save Yato's life despite the risks involved. When she was still Yato's Shinki, she was given the name Tomone (伴音) and transformed into a small dagger. As Tenjin's Shinki, she transforms into a smoking pipe. She later started to get annoyed with him, so Yato let her go.
Kazuma (兆麻)
Voiced by: Jun Fukuyama (Japanese); Eric Vale (English)
He is one of Bishamonten's Shinki and exemplar. His name as Shinki is "Chōki" (兆器), whose shape was originally a nail earring, but because of his close bond with Bishamonten and will to protect her, he became a Blessed Shinki and transformed into a cherry blossom shaped earring who is capable of tracking enemies and also to guide other Shinki in combat. He regards Yato as his benefactor, despite Yato being enemies with Bishamonten.
Daikoku (大黒)
Voiced by: Daisuke Ono (Japanese); Ian Sinclair (English)
Daikoku is Kofuku's somewhat overprotective Shinki. He regards himself as Kofuku's husband, and once raised a child Shinki with her. His name as Shinki is "Kokki" (黒器), whose form is a fan.
Nora (野良)
Voiced by: Rie Kugimiya (Japanese); Lauren Landa (English)
Nora—meaning "stray"—refers to Shinki who serve multiple masters and bear multiple names. As Yato's former Shinki originally named Hiiro (緋) with the weapon name "Hiki" (緋器), she continues offering herself to him despite his refusals. Known for causing conflict, she deliberately undermines Yukine's confidence and attempts to kill Hiyori using Phantoms. When this fails, she erases Hiyori's memories of Yukine and Yato. Her presence during Yukine's ablution ceremony would have proved fatal for him. Having served as Yato's Shinki since his childhood, she shares a long and complex history with him.
Kuraha (囷巴)
Voiced by: Kazuhiko Inoue (Japanese); Greg Dulcie (English)
Kuraha is Bishamonten's Shinki. His Shinki form is a male lion with a scar on his right eye. His name as Shinki is "Kinki" (囷器).
Kugaha (陸巴)
Voiced by: Takanori Hoshino (Japanese); Phil Parsons (English)
A main antagonist of the second season. Kugaha is Bishamonten's former Shinki. He was Bishamonten's doctor, but betrayed her because he wanted to reincarnate Bishamonten and become her new exemplar. His Shinki form is a balance scale. He is actually a Nora and his name "Kuga" was revoked. His name as Bishamonten's Shinki was "Rokki" (陸器).
Aiha (藍巴)
Voiced by: Hisako Tōjō (Japanese); Michelle Rojas (English)
Aiha is Bishamonten's Shinki. She was manipulated by Kugaha to help her reincarnate Bishamonten and was severely blighted. Her Shinki form is a silver knight armor used in combat.
Akiha (秋巴)
Voiced by: Shinya Takahashi (Japanese); Seth Magill (English)
Akiha is Bishamonten's Shinki. His name as Shinki is "Shuuki" (秋器), whose form is a dagger.
Karuha (刈巴)
Voiced by: Satomi Akesaka (Japanese); Colleen Clinkenbeard (English)
Karuha is Bishamonten's Shinki. Her name as Shinki is "Gaiki" (刈器), whose form is a revolver.
Kazuha (数巴)
Voiced by: Satomi Akesaka (Japanese); Colleen Clinkenbeard (English)
Kazuha is Bishamonten's Shinki. His Shinki name is "Suuki" (数器), whose form is a .45 caliber pistol.
Kinuha (紝巴)
Voiced by: Kanami Satō (Japanese); Mallorie Rodak (English)
Kinuha is Bishamonten's Shinki. Her Shinki name is "Jinki" (紝器), whose form is a tipped-whip.
Tsuguha (紹巴)
Voiced by: Ari Ozawa (Japanese); Monica Rial (English)
Tsuguha was Bishamonten's former Shinki. Her Shinki name was "Shoki" (紹器).
Yugiha (靫巴)
Voiced by: Mariko Higashiuchi (Japanese); Ricco Fajardo (English)
Yugiha is Bishamonten's Shinki. His Shinki name is "Saiki" (靫器), whose form is a Great Sword with abstract motifs.

== Others ==
Tsuyu (梅雨)
Voiced by: Saori Hayami (Japanese); Jamie Marchi (English)
Tsuyu is the spirit of a plum tree who has lived with Tenjin for 1,000 years. She is not a Shinki, but rather stays with Tenjin out of a lasting love. Because she is a tree spirit, she is able to communicate with other trees.
Kouto Fujisaki (藤崎 浩人)
Voiced by: Kaito Ishikawa (Japanese); Clifford Chapin (English)
Fujisaki, a third-year student at Hiyori's school, serves as the vessel for Yato and Nora's creator—a centuries-old human conjurer who survives by possessing new bodies. This sorcerer, who once journeyed to and returned from Yomi with the first Phantom Brush (Koto no Ha), created Yato through a wish to eradicate humanity and destroy the gods. As the only human who remembers Yato, he sustains the god's existence despite his lack of followers. His hatred of gods stems from the death of a freckled woman he loved, implied to have been killed by divine forces. This loss drove his desire to create a god of calamity, as noted by Nana, who recognizes the grief behind his vendetta.
Hashimoto (橋本)
Voiced by: Natsuki Hanae (Japanese); Orion Pitts (English)
A student and friend of Hiyori Iki and has known her from childhood. He is uneasy around Yukine and Yato by finding them strange.
Mutsumi (睦美)
Voiced by: Mikako Komatsu
A female student who suffers persistent bullying from her classmates. She only appears in the first chapter of the manga and for a brief moment in the first episode of the anime.
