= Alive: The Final Evolution =

Japanese manga series

- First tankōbon volume cover

アライブ 最終 進化的 少年 (Araibu Saishū Shinkateki Shōnen)
- Genre: Horror; Science fiction; Thriller
- Manga
- Written by: Tadashi Kawashima
- Illustrated by: Adachitoka
- Published by: Kodansha
- English publisher: NA: Del Rey Manga (former, vol. 1–8); Kodansha USA (current, digital)
- Magazine: Monthly Shōnen Magazine
- Original run: April 6, 2003 – February 6, 2010
- Volumes: 21
- icon

Alive: The Final Evolution (Japanese: アライブ -最終 進化的 少年-, Hepburn: Araibu Saishū Shinkateki Shōnen; lit. 'Alive: Last Evolutionary Boy') is a Japanese manga series written by Tadashi Kawashima and illustrated by Adachitoka. It was serialized in Kodansha's shōnen manga magazine Monthly Shōnen Magazine from April 2003 to February 2010; it was Kawashima's last work before his death in June of that same year. Its chapters were collected in 21 tankōbon volumes. In North America, Del Rey Manga licensed series for an English localization and released eight volumes. In July 2016, Kodansha USA took over North American release of the series digitally only.

An anime adaptation for the series was planned and to be produced by Gonzo and co-produced by Anime International Company, but the adaptation was canceled due to Gonzo being delisted from the Tokyo Stock Exchange.

== Plot ==
The series follows Taisuke Kanou, a teenage student in Japan who lives a normal life with his sister Yoko Kanou and his friend Hirose. The story begins when an alien being flies towards Earth after sensing life emanating from there. It is learned that the being, Akuro, is composed of souls who were granted immortality but preferred to die but could not do so without a body. These beings separate from each other and enter the bodies of humans in order to pursue death. As a result, a large number of people begin to commit suicide worldwide and the incident became known as Nightmare Week. The humans who resist Akuro's influence gain powers from their possession and become known as "Comrades."

When Taisuke's friend, Yuichi Hirose, discovers his powers he kidnaps his friend Megumi Ochiai and heads north to the heart of Akuro. Taisuke, obtaining his own powers, follows in an attempt to bring Hirose and Megumi back home. On his adventures, he is accompanied by comrades Yuta Takizawa and Nami Kusunoki. He tracks down Hirose to a lake where the latter absorbs Akuro's heart. Taisuke defeats Hirose by triggering a volcanic eruption, which apparently kills them both and destroys the heart.

Two years later Yuta and Nami learn from Aoi Tezuka and Jun Tezuka that Taisuke is alive. They meet Taisuke, who has been living with amnesia since his battle with Hirose. After regaining his memories, they learn from Yukie Tezuka that the army is holding the dormant Hirose. Together they set out to destroy him along with the heart. After several attempts at infiltrating the military compound, Hirose awakens and flees from the military base. Deducing Hirose's return to Japan, Taisuke and his friends prepare for the upcoming battle.

Eventually Hirose is defeated by Taisuke who is empowered by the piece of Akuro's heart. Akuro's consciences, Mitama, uses the Akuro heart pieces to gather and recompile Akuro. Hirose, acknowledging his crimes, has his soul accompany Akuro into space. As all the pieces of Akuro leave their hosts, comrades are rendered powerless once again and the world returns to peace.

== Characters ==
=== Protagonists ===
The major protagonists in the series. From left to right: Aoi Tezuka, Rei Tezuka, Megumi Ochai, Taisuke Kano, Jun Tezuka, Yuta Takizawa, and Nami Kusunoki

Taisuke Kano (叶 太輔, Kanō Taisuke)
He is haunted by guilt for his role in the accident that killed his parents. After his parents died, he was raised by his older sister, Yoko Kanō (叶 陽子, Kanō Yōko). Taisuke's ability is destruction and reconstruction. Though unable to fully use his reconstruction abilities, Taisuke is able to manifest his destruction abilities by emitting fire which permanently damages cells.
Yuta Takizawa (瀧沢 勇太, Takizawa Yūta)
A young boy who gains his powers after his mother commits suicide in front of him. His power is isolation, cutting off objects from the outside world by creating psychic barriers of various sizes, for defensive purposes or trapping his opponents. After his mother's death, Yuta's father disowned him in fear of his powers and mistaking that Yuta killed his own mother. He journeys with Taisuke after witnessing his kindness and teaches him the basics on using his powers. After Taisuke's apparent death, Yuta resumes his daily life in the care of his grandparents.
Nami Kusunoki (楠 奈美, Kusunoki Nami)
She has the power to freeze water to form any shape she chooses, usually forming it into claws to augment her martial arts, and projecting them like knives to pierce and freeze her targets. Her younger brother, Satoru, was burned alive by Kanon's abilities leading to her hate of Comrades. She journeys with Taisuke and Yuta in search of Katsumata after learning Kanon had joined him. She gradually begins to develop a romantic interest towards Taisuke and begins to envy his and Megumi's relationship.

==== The Tezuka Family ====
Yukie Tezuka (手塚 由紀恵, Tezuka Yukie)
Mother of the seven Tezuka children who each have separate fathers of different nationalities. Before "Nightmare Week" occurred, Yukie was a nomadic woman who traveled constantly leaving her children to live on their own. Upon acquiring a piece of Akuro's heart, Yukie is able to feel her families sadness due to her abandonment causing her to return to her family and taking a more maternal role. Using the powers of Akuro's heart, she is able to manipulate other people into her bidding. After Taisuke's battle with Hirose, she nurses him back to life. She is killed by Hirose when he awakens and had her piece of the heart stolen.
Rei Tezuka (手塚 伶, Tezuka Rei)
Yukie's eldest son. He is 28 years old, who took care of his younger siblings in Yukie's absence. Her second eldest son, Jun Tezuka (手塚 純, Tezuka Jun), is a 27 years old martial artist and a Comrade with the ability to manipulate electricity. Anzu Tezuka (手塚 杏, Tezuka Anzu) is the 16 years old daughter and a computer wiz. She controls the technical aspects of their operations. Aoi Tezuka (手塚 葵, Tezuka Aoi) is the second oldest daughter in the family and is 10 years old. She is Yuta's classmate and a Comrade with the ability to run at high speeds. The last 3 kids are Osomatsu, Karamatsu and Choromatsu (nicknames), and 5, 4 and 3 years old, respectively.

=== Antagonists ===
Yuichi Hirose (広瀬 雄一, Hirose Yūichi)
He was Taisuke's best friend. He is a timid and shy boy who is often bullied, but saved by Taisuke. After Nightmare Week, Hirose becomes a comrade allowing him to fire spheres which can annihilate anything. After he accidentally murders his bullies, Hirose is put into police custody where Katsumata brainwashes him into joining him to search for a piece of Akuro's heart. He complies after kidnapping his childhood friend, Megumi. Upon absorbing the piece of Akuro's heart, his body becomes intangible and he gains the desire to destroy all life on Earth.
Shigeki Katsumata (勝又 重喜, Katsumata Shigeki)
Lead investigator of Hirose's incident. He has a piece of Akuro's heart allowing him to brainwash his minions which he uses to gather Comrades for Mitama's purposes. He is eventually revealed to be plotting Mitama's demise but his plan fails. He is then killed by Mitama who takes his Akuro Heart piece.
Akuro (アクロ, Akuro)
An alien being containing the souls of an advanced civilization that obtained immortality. Without a body, the souls were unable to die and searched for hosts in order to commit suicide. Upon finding Earth, Akuro split into the souls of the civilization, three hearts, and a single consciousness referred to as Mitama (御霊, lit. "The Soul"). Mitama originally inhabits the body of an owl, and later is able to enter and animate a girl's corpse.

==== Katsumata's Comrades ====
Katsumata had recruited six other Comrades to journey with him on the expedition to Akuro's heart.

- Takumi Yura (由良 匠, Yura Takumi) is an artist who loves drawing people he knows with the aim of knowing them better. His ability is to create pressurized bubbles which he can detonate at any time. After Taisuke and Hirose's apparent deaths, he defects from Katsumata's rankings. He later joins the Tezuka family in order to search for the heart. Yura is later killed by Hirose.
- Kenichirou Morio (森尾 健一郎, Morio Kenichirō) is a Comrade with the ability to create wind blades to cut objects. He was tasked with murdering Taisuke by Katsumata, but ultimately fails. He commits suicide after giving in to Akuro's influences when Hirose absorbs a piece of Akuro's heart.
- Gou Okada (岡田 剛, Okada Gō) is an obese otaku with an inferiority complex. Okada's power is Shinigami's Contract, allowing him to create promises with others and when the promise is broken, results in their deaths. He also committed suicide after Hirose absorbs the Heart.
- Kanon Mitachi (御館 華音, Mitachi Kanon) is a selfish girl who goes through all lengths to have what she wants. She killed Nami's brother out of annoyance with her ability which allows her to detonate metallic objects. She dies after failing to absorb Akuro's heart.
- Hideo Asou (麻生 英雄, Asō Hideo) is a Catholic priest whose ability allows him to petrify anything he touches. After petrifying a child he attempted to save during Nightmare Week, Asou begins to suffer from his mistake and is brainwashed by Katsumata to do his bidding. He commits suicide after Hirose's fusion with the Heart.
- Ron Hasegawa (長谷川 論, Hasegawa Ron) was a young boy at Asou's church who became a Comrade with the ability to liquify himself. After Asou's death, he joins Kyouko Amamiya and Masashi Oda on their journey as reporters.

After Taisuke and Hirose's apparent deaths, Katsumata had brainwashed three other comrades to assist him and Mitama to find the other two pieces of Akuro's heart.

- Han (ハン) is a Comrade with the ability to enter and take over another person's body, killing them in the process. Under Katsumata's orders she infiltrates the American military to get closer to the heart, but is eventually killed by D2 and McPhearson after entering the body of his subordinate, D3.
- Michael (ミケーレ) is a muscular man who does menial tasks for Katsumata. He is able to control gravity. He is killed by Hirose after being ordered to take his piece of Akuro's heart.
- Ludger (ルドガー) is a mysterious man who is searching for the meaning of life. He has the ability to copy and retain another Comrade's power. After confronting Katsumata on his goals, his fate is left unknown.

==== Military ====
James McPherson (マクファーソン)
Sergeant in charge of Akuro's heart. He is highly skilled and is able to kill Comrades though he possess none of their abilities. He is ruthless, viewing his subordinates as expendable once he no longer needs them. However, he risks his life to save D4. He eventually sides with Taisuke's group and helps leak military information to the public about "Power Users" under the pseudonym Clay. He has three subordinates D2 (ディーツー), known as Carl Adler, D3 (ディースリー), and D4 (ディーフォー). As the series progresses D2 and D3 are killed off. D4, known as Emma (はエマ), is the only female member of the team who stays by McPherson for romantic reasons.
Daniel Friedkin (ダン・フリードキン)
The military use the comrade Daniel Friedkin, referred to as the "Poet" (詩人, Shijin) in order to predict future events. He possesses a piece of Akuro's heart. He was killed by Mitama and had his piece of the heart taken.

=== Other characters ===
Megumi Ochiai (落合 恵, Ochiai Megumi)
Taisuke's childhood friend. After Hirose joins Katsumata, he kidnaps Megumi to be with her. She is eventually put under Katsumata's mind control making her subconsciously stay with the group. During the two year time skip, she lives with Katsumata and attends to Mitama's care in America.
Ryou Fukiishi (吹石 稜, Fukiishi Ryō)
A truck driver that Taisuke encounters after just leaving his home in search of his friends. She leaves Yuta with her phone number so he can call her if he gets lonely as she bears a striking resemblance to Yuta's late mother. She has a husband and a daughter that she adores. She visits Taisuke's sister every year on his birthday.
Kyouko Amamiya (雨宮 今日子, Amamiya Kyōko) and Masashi Oda (小田 正志, Oda Masashi)
They are reporters, chasing after Taisuke in order to investigate the strange happenings surrounding him. Upon learning the truth, they side with Taisuke and attempt to assist him anyway possible.

== Publication ==
Written by Tadashi Kawashima and illustrated by Adachitoka, Alive: The Final Evolution started in Kodansha's shōnen manga magazine Monthly Shōnen Magazine on April 6, 2003. (Note: It started in the magazine's May 2003 issue (cover date). The magazine is published on the 6th of the month preceding the one indicated by the issue.) The series finished on February 6, 2010; Kawashima finished the series on his sickbed and died months later in June. Kodansha collected its chapters in 21 tankōbon volumes, released from November 17, 2003, to May 17, 2010.

In North America, Del Rey Manga licensed the series for an English release. Eight volumes were released from July 31, 2007, to November 24, 2009. Kodansha USA acquired the license and began releasing Alive: The Final Evolution volumes digitally in July 2016, with previously unpublished Volume 9 releasing in October 2016. The last volume was released in August 2017.

=== Volumes ===
No.	Original release date	Original ISBN	English release date	English ISBN
01	November 17, 2003	978-4-06-333914-7	July 31, 2007 (Del Rey); July 26, 2016 (Kodansha)	978-0-3-4550-083-0 (Del Rey); 978-1-68233-322-8 (Kodansha)
1. "Which Side will you Choose?"; 2. "Aren't we Friends?"; 3. "I Will Protect You"
An alien being finds life on Earth and heads towards it, breaking up into pieces and invading human bodies causing it enters to suicide with the event being dubbed as Nightmare Week. High-School student Taisuke Kano one day discovers that his friend Yuichi Hirose has unintentionally annihilated his bullies with the use of an unknown power and is consequently taken into custody. The mass suicide is deduced to be caused by a virus on the media; On the streets, Taisuke runs into Takumi Yura who tells him they both have the virus and displays his supernatural powers to him. Hirose is eventually released from custody and goes to school. He attempts to kill Taisuke and kidnaps his childhood friend, Megumi Ochiai. After Taisuke survives falling off the school roof due to a sudden burst in strength, Hirose reveals Taisuke has become a Comrade also and departs.
02	December 17, 2003	978-4-06-333917-8	October 30, 2007 (Del Rey); July 26, 2016 (Kodansha)	978-0-3-4549-922-6 (Del Rey); 978-1-68233-323-5 (Kodansha)
4. "If its still a Man"; 5. "Embarkment"; 6. "Here Forever"; 7. "For What"
Taisuke awakens in a hospital three days later and investigates on Hirose's whereabouts. He runs into Yura who explains those infected with the suicide virus and survived gained powers and are dubbed as Comrades. Yura invites Taisuke to a gathering of Comrades by Shigeki Katsumata, the detective in charge of Hirose's case, and learns that Hirose will be there. Taisuke begins journeying North and is picked up by a woman named Ryou Fukiishi when his bike breaks down. At a gas station, a child named Yuta Takizawa, puts up a force field around the area. He reveals he is a Comrade and challenges Taisuke to break his barrier before the oxygen supply runs out. As Yuta bonds with Fukiishi, he eventually releases the barrier and isolates Fukiishi alone. Taisuke realizes that Yuta wants Taisuke to kill him so he may be reunited with his mother and stops Yuta from killing himself. Yuta decides to accompany Taisuke on his journey and teaches him how to use his power, which is revealed to be heat. They are then confronted by the Comrade Kenichirou Morio who had been ordered by Katsumata to kill Taisuke.
03	June 17, 2004	978-4-06-333936-9	February 19, 2008 (Del Rey); August 16, 2016 (Kodansha)	978-0-3-4549-937-0 (Del Rey); 978-1-68233-337-2 (Kodansha)
8. "The Obstacle"; 9. "Tell Me!"; 10. "What Do you See?"; 11. "For What"
Taisuke is able to wound Morio allowing him and Yuta to flee. The pair then meet a blind elderly Comrade named Misaki Kiyomitsu who reveals that Taisuke will have to make a difficult choice in the future. Taisuke's bike is run over by a young man named Teruyoshi with his little sister Rin. They offer a ride to the two in penance. They soon learn that the sibling's father, Utsonomiya Yoshikatsu, is a Comrade and is trying to murder his two children. Yoshikatsu reveals his motive is to kill his family before Katsumata puts his plan into action to reduce their suffering. Taisuke rebukes his intentions, exclaiming a father must protect his family. Yoshikatsu decides to kill himself and uses his powers of illusion to convince his children that he had died alongside his wife during Nightmare Week.
04	October 15, 2004	978-4-06-370960-5	April 29, 2008 (Del Rey); August 30, 2016 (Kodansha)	978-0-3-4549-938-7 (Del Rey); 978-1-68233-338-9 (Kodansha)
12. "The Obvious Thing"; 13. "Friend, You Say?"; 14. "How Can It?"; 15. "The Awkward Child"
Katsumata leads his group of comrades to Hokkaido in order to acquire a piece of the alien being's heart, referred to as Akuro. Mitama, a talking owl which houses Akuro's consciousness guides them onwards. Meanwhile, a pair of journalists named Kyouko Amamiya and Masashi Oda are investigating the whereabouts of Taisuke and Katsumata following their trail to the north. Taisuke and Yuta find Katsumata's lodging and are confronted by a Comrade, a high school girl named Nami Kusunoki. Nami attacks them due to her dislike of Comrades which is stemmed by the recent murder of her brother. They eventually reach a truce upon discovering they are both after Katsumata and his group. A Comrade, a fat man named Gou Okada, is killing passengers on a ferry Taisuke's group is on. Okada is cornered by Taisuke during his kill spree resorts to holding a girl hostage while demanding Nami to kill his Taisuke and Yuta.
05	February 17, 2005	978-4-06-370976-6	June 24, 2008 (Del Rey); September 13, 2016 (Kodansha)	978-0-3-4550-080-9 (Del Rey); 978-1-68233-348-8 (Kodansha)
16. "There is No Difference"; 17. "In Human Hearts..."; 18. "I Resemble Someone?"; 19. "That Time I..."
Nami is able to separate the girl from Okada allowing Taisuke to incapacitate him. As Taisuke recovers in the hospital, he is visited by Katsumata who explains the source of the powers: Pieces of Akuro invaded humans and those unable to resist its influence commit suicide. Those with strong negative feelings are able to resist the urge and in return gain powers. Before leaving, Katsumata explains Taisuke's feelings of guilt was what gave him powers and that Akuro's heart is located in a lake. Kanon Mitachi, a Comrade and murderer of Nami's brother, joins Katsumata's rankings. Due to envy, she frees Megumi and attempts to kill her. Megumi escapes but realizes most of her memories have been removed by Katsumata. As Hirose pursues her, he murders a policeman deepening his negative feelings and strengthening his powers. Using his strengthened powers, he annihlates a police station before taking Megumi back to the hideout.
06	June 17, 2005	978-4-06-370996-4	October 28, 2008 (Del Rey); September 27, 2016 (Kodansha)	978-0-3-4550-081-6 (Del Rey); 978-1-68233-349-5 (Kodansha)
20. "Now Only That..."; 21. "If It Isn't?"; 22. "It has Changed"; 23. "Wait a Minute!"
With Hirose's deepened negative emotions, Katsumata selects him to become the host of Akuro's heart. The journalists Amamiya and Oda eventually find Taisuke and his friends while camping and accompany them in order to find out the truth about recent events. With the information given by the journalists, Taisuke and friends are able to narrow in on Katsumata's hideout. On the way there, they are invited by a girl named Haruka to lodge at her house. Haruka explains she is looking for her pet horse who went missing. Taisuke and Nami eventually find and free the horse from a swamp and return to the house. They discover that a Comrade, pastor Hideo Asou, has turned Yuta into stone which will inadvertently lead to his death. Yuta and Nami engage Asou and a young child Comrade named Ron Hasegawa in battle and eventually defeat them. Asou deems Yuta too far gone to save but Taisuke, in a desperate attempt, is able to undo the petrification and save Yuta.
07	October 17, 2005	978-4-06-371013-7	July 28, 2009 (Del Rey); October 11, 2016 (Kodansha)	978-0-3-4550-082-3 (Del Rey); 978-1-68233-350-1 (Kodansha)
24. "Tomorrow..."; 25. "Sister"; 26. "Let's Go Back!"; 27. "No Significance"
Interested in Taisuke's power, Asou offers to lead the group to the lake where Akuro's heart resides. They steal the journalists car and head to the lake while Nami stays behind to face Kanon Mitachi. The group arrive at the lake and are confronted by Katsumata and Hirose. Megumi returns to Taisuke and is forced to stay in contact with him due to Gou Okada's powers. Katsumata's minions then engage Taisuke in battle since Comrades fighting will bring up Akuro's heart from the bottom of the lake. To prolong the battle, Katsumata brainwashes Asou to keep the balance on both sides in the battle. Nami is able to defeat Kanon but is then confronted by Yura who proposes to fight in her place.
08	February 16, 2006	978-4-06-371029-8	November 24, 2009 (Del Rey); October 25, 2016 (Kodansha)	978-0-3-4550-083-0 (Del Rey); 978-1-68233-351-8 (Kodansha)
28. "Out of Sight"; 29. "Because of You..."; 30. "What?"; 31. "I Missed You"
The battles continue and Yuta is able to protect Megumi from Okada's powers allowing Taisuke to fight freely. Asou helps the overpowered Taisuke but eventually fights against him when Taisuke gains the lead. As Taisuke becomes overwhelmed, a personality created from his Akuro piece takes over allowing him to over power Asou. Before the finishing attack, Haruku stops Taisuke allowing him to regain control. However, she is then killed by Hirose. Akuro's heart is resurrected and Kanon takes it and fatally injures Nami. Kanon's body is then torn apart due to its overwhelming power allowing Hirose to absorb the piece of the Heart.
09	June 16, 2006	978-4-06-371050-2	November 29, 2016	978-1-6-8233-439-3
32. "Always"; 33. "It's About Life"; 34. "What can I do?" 35. "Thank You"
Hirose's fusion with the piece of Akuro's heart causes the Comrades throughout the world to commit a second wave of mass suicide; Taisuke, Yuta, Nami, Megumi, Hirose and Katsumata are the only ones left alive by the lake. Realizing the gap in their powers, Taisuke opts to face Hirose alone. Katsumata kidnaps Megumi after knocking Yuta and Nami unconscious. Taisuke reminisces about the past and thanks Hirose before surrounding them in an eruption of fire. In the woods, one of the bodies give birth to a baby that walks away from the lake.
10	October 17, 2006	978-4-06-371064-9	December 20, 2016	978-1-6-8233-440-9
Intermission; 36. "Still Alive"; 37. "I Know"; 38. "You Want to Meet?"
Two years pass and Taisuke's eruption was concluded to be a Volcano by the public. Amamiya and Oda return to investigate the site when they discover that the Americans have taken interest on the incident. Yuta and Nami spend time with Taisuke's sister to celebrate his eighteenth birthday before returning to their normal lives. Yuta's class receives a new student named Aoi Tezuka, a Comrade who reveals to Yuta that Taisuke is alive. Meanwhile, Nami is also confronted by the Comrade Jun Tezuka. Amamiya is fatally stabbed by a military man while meeting with a military informant but learns the military has Hirose who is in a dormant state. Yuta eventually finds Aoi's home and demands to see Taisuke.
11	February 16, 2007	978-4-06-371080-9	January 10, 2017	978-1-6-8233-467-6
39. "Man Is The Only Creature That Refuses To Be What He Is"; 40. "Memory"; 41. "Don't Want to be Alone"; 42. "Who Else Is There"
Yuma and Nami meet Taisuke who is revealed to be suffering from amnesia and has been living with the Tezuka family since his supposed death. Meanwhile, Amamiya survives her attack and is on the run from the military. She and Oda hide at Yoko Kano's home and are eventually picked up to meet with Taisuke causing him to regain his memories. The mother of the Tezuka family, Yukie Tezuka, has her kids and Taisuke's friends invade a military base in order to retrieve and seal Hirose permanently.
12	June 15, 2007	978-4-06-371094-6	April 4, 2017	978-1-6-8233-623-6
43. "Live As If You Were to Die Tomorrow"; 44. "In front of our Eyes"; 45. "It's Not Over Yet"; 46. "What About Me?"
Taisuke's group is confronted by the military soldier D4 who is able to predict their moves allowing her to completely avoid their attacks. She locks them in a truck after knocking them unconscious. Taisuke manages to free them allowing them to retreat. Deeming their mission a failure, Taisuke and his friends return home to wait for the next chance to retrieve Hirose. Taisuke decides to lodge with Nami since he promised he will not return home until everything is finished. Michele, a Comrade working for Katsumata, finds Taisuke and delivers him a message from Megumi.
13	October 17, 2007	978-4-06-371114-1	April 18, 2017	978-1-6-8233-620-5
47. "Now That I See It"; 48. "That's Why"; 49. "As Expected, He's Lonely"; 50. "The Beginning and the End"
Taisuke is told that Megumi is with Katsumata and Mitama, the talking owl who transferred into the body of a young girl. Meanwhile, the ship transferring Hirose is sunk by Han, another Comrade working for Katsumata; causing Hirose to sink under the ocean. Taisuke and friends are called by Yukie to fly overseas near the position where the ship sunk. Meanwhile, McPherson and his subordinates meet with a Comrade known as the Poet, who is possesses one of the four pieces of Akuro's heart. The Poet explains that Taisuke is the key to awakening Hirose causing the military to search for him.
14	February 15, 2008	978-4-06-371114-1	May 2, 2017	978-1-6-8233-653-3
51. "Centerstage"; 52. "Sorry"; 53. "The Reason Why It Can't Be Spoken"; 54. "Answer Me"
Han attempts to infiltrate the military by taking over D3, but is assassinated by McPherson after deducing her identity. Taisuke's group meanwhile attempts to retrieve Hirose but are impeded by the appearances of Katsumata's comrades, Michele and Ludger. Nami is defeated by Ludger who spares her when she calls out Taisuke's name as her reason for living. Meanwhile, Taisuke is overwhelmed by Michele but is saved when the military intervenes.
15	June 17, 2008	978-4-06-371155-4	May 16, 2017	978-1-6-8233-683-0
55. "The Darkness of the Soul"; 56. "I'll Cry"; 57. "One Man"; 58. "Please!"
Yura arrives and attempts to destroy the military causing them to retreat. They give Taisuke an ultimatum demanding him to surrender himself. Taisuke and his friends realize that Aoi was kidnapped by the military and are calling Taisuke out for an exchange. Meanwhile, Mitama takes Megumi with her to search for Hirose. Taisuke complies to the demand and meets McPherson on an oil platform located over Hirose's location; McPherson demands Taisuke to use his powers believing it will awaken Hirose. At the same time Yukie with an army of brainwashed military soldiers invade the platform to combat McPherson's army.
16	October 17, 2008	978-4-06-371162-2	May 30, 2017	978-1-6-8233-706-6
59. "Mama's Words Are"; 60. "With Everything on the Line"; 61. "Is It Necessary?"; 62. "Because I Can't Keep Living This Way"
Yukie finds Aoi but realizes the Poet had brainwashed her. D4 and D2 are defeated by Nami and Yura respectively. Yukie eventually breaks Aoi out of the Poet's control but is then captured by the military.
17	February 17, 2009	978-4-06-371182-0	June 13, 2017	978-1-6-8233-707-3
63. "The Endpoint"; 64. "If..."; 65. "Mom"; 66. "Like a Family"
Yukie is able to free herself and her daughter by mind controlling a soldier into shooting her. Hirose, having sensed Taisuke and Megumi's presence, awakens. He kills Yukie and takes her Akuro Heart piece before departing in silence.
18	June 17, 2009	978-4-06-371198-1; 978-4-06-362146-4 (SE)	July 4, 2017	978-1-6-8233-764-6
67. "Not Anymore"; 68. "I Will Still Fight"; 69. "And Then, At That Time"; 70. "What is Wanted"
The Tezuka Family grieve for the death of their mother and decide to exact revenge on Hirose. After risking his life to save D4's life, McPherson receives surgery to heal his face, and also fixes his nose problem he received from his abusive father. As a result, he contemplates on his goals for the military. At night, Mitama kills the poet and takes his Akuro Heart piece. Michele and Ludger are ordered by Katsumata to take Hirose's Akuro Hearts but inadvertently fail to do so. Upon deducing Hirose is returning to Tokyo, Taisuke resides with Megumi and Mitama as they await for his arrival.
19	October 16, 2009	978-4-06-371211-7	July 18, 2017	978-1-6-8233-765-3
71. "What Should be Done?"; 72. "Evolution"; 73. "The Road, the Way Home"; 74. "May You Live Everyday of Your Life"
Mitama gives Taisuke her Akuro's heart piece for the upcoming battle. Taisuke walks with Nami around Tokyo and before heading returning home, receives a kiss from her. Meanwhile, McPherson informs the President of the United States that Hirose will be arriving in Tokyo. Tokyo is then evacuated for the upcoming battle.
20	February 17, 2010	978-4-06-371229-2	August 1, 2017	978-1-6-8233-763-9
75. "Marionette"; 76. "Understand?"; 77. "It Would Be Best If It Was Destroyed"; 78. "I Want To Win"
After Hirose destroys the army, Taisuke and his friends combat Hirose. Elsewhere, Katsumata is confronted by Ludger on his true intentions. Katsumata reveals he was pretending to be following Mitama but was waiting for her body to break down so that when she absorbed Akuro's heart, she would die from being unable to handle its powers. In the midst of battle, Taisuke fixes the tension between himself and Nami by professing he loves Megumi. As he continues to fight Hirose, Taisuke is seemingly killed.
21	May 17, 2010	978-4-06-371229-2	August 29, 2017	978-1-6-8233-802-5
79. "Wish"; 80. "Views of the World"; 81. "The Planet Will Become One"; 82. "Hope Everyone's Doing Well"
Taisuke, having evaded the attack, takes the two Akuro Heart pieces from Hirose causing him to regress into a normal Comrade. The President of the United States sends a nuclear missile towards Tokyo but is erased by Hirose. Hirose offers to travel with Mitama as a part of Akuro to repent for his crimes and his soul leaves his body. As Akuro leaves Earth, it gathers all its pieces returning Comrades back to normal. Five years pass and the aftermath of the characters is shown.

== Reception ==
The first volume was generally well received by reviewers. Manga Life's Dan Polley praised the plot for being different from normal science fiction but still retained the core that appeals to fans of that genre. He also commented on how Adachitoka's art style suited the manga. Katherine Dacey of Pop Culture Shock also commended the plot for not showing the cause of the mass suicide which helps create a "deliciously creepy atmosphere". She described the first volume as "...a suspenseful, entertaining read that mixed teen angst and X-Files paranoia to good effect". Deb Aoki from About.com also praised the mixture of science fiction and high-school life but criticized the overused "shonen manga stereotypes". In his appendix to Manga: The Complete Guide, Jason Thompson commended the art style for being "...an attractive example of the Shonen Magazine house style, with photorealistic environments" and concluded the series to be "An above average "realistic superheroes" story.". Greg McElhatton from Read About Comics panned the volume for its muddled plot and how shock treatments appearing in quick succession lessen the shock effect of each event and stated the volume overall as a disappointment.

Carlo Santos of Anime News Network regards the series' plot pacing to be slow and commented on how the art style is too ordinary making most characters not stand out. He commended the psychological battle in volume 5 and praised Hirose's character transformation. Comics Worth Reading's Ed Sizemore review of the first eight volumes of the series was highly positive. He praised the slow-build storytelling by Tadashi Kawashima for being interesting and suspenseful and commends Taisuke Kano's to be an extremely believable character. He originally considered the art style unimpressive, but as the series continues, he notes that Adachitoka's art style improves immensely and compares it to Takeshi Obata's style. The improved art style is later praised for the character's emotion and body language and the fluid fight scenes.
