= List of Unbreakable Machine-Doll characters =

The List of Unbreakable Machine-Doll characters is a comprehensive list of characters, with concise information about them, of the Unbreakable Machine-Doll series, a Japanese light novel series written by Reiji Kaitou and illustrated by Ruroo which has been adapted into a manga series and an anime series.

The Unbreakable Machine-Doll series is a historical fiction of the early 20th century that mainly centres upon Raishin Akabane and his path of revenge.

== Main characters ==
Raishin Akabane (赤羽 雷真, Akabane Raishin)
Voiced by: Hiro Shimono (Japanese); Clifford Chapin (English)
A Japanese puppeteer from the Akabane Clan. Raishin is a spy for the Japanese Army and had Shouko Karyuusai mediate for him to be assigned of entering the Walpurgis Royal Academy of Machinart to join the Night Party and spy on the latest Machinart developed by major world powers as he wants to exact revenge on his elder brother, Tenzen Akabane, whom he suspects of having killed their clan and of being Magnus who is in the Academy. After arriving at the Academy and taking the transfer admission test, he was originally placed in the 1235th seat, out of 1236, but after defeating Felix Kingsfort, he was then placed to the 100th seat, becoming a Gauntlet. Raishin's registration code is Second Last (下から二番目(セカンドラスト), Sekando Rasuto). He has black (dark brown) hair and wears a brown harness together with the Academy's student uniform. He is an acute observer and is an audacious person who boldly makes his choices.

Yaya (夜々)
Voiced by: Hitomi Harada (Japanese); Bryn Apprill (English)
Raishin Akabane's automaton. Yaya is a Banned Doll and is one of the Karyuusai brand's Setsugetsuka series created by Shouko Karyuusai. She has black hair and wears a black kimono together with, originally, a pair of black geta which was replaced by a pair of black (dark brown) boots after the train incident. Yaya is a sprightly person who talks in a third person point of view. She is in love with Raishin and is often jealous at the women around him, and which often to an extent, results for her to violently attack him. Yaya possesses the magic circuit, Kongouriki (金剛力(こんごうりき), Kongōriki), which allows her to harden all her monads which allows her to gain an increase of strength for attack, defense, and fast movement.
Irori (いろり)
Voiced by: Ai Kayano (Japanese); Alexis Tipton (English)
The personal attendant of Karyusai Shouko and the eldest of the three Setsugetsuka sisters she created out of human cells. Irori has a long silver hair and wears a light blue kimono with its sleeves tied up, light blue gloves, and black platform sandals. She possesses the "Himokagami" magic circuit and has the ability to freeze as much as a city.
Komurasaki (小紫)
Voiced by: Yui Ogura (Japanese); Lara Woodhull (English)
The youngest of the three Setsugetsuka sisters created out of human cells by Karyusai Shouko. Komurasaki has a long red hair tied into twin tails and wears a purple sleeveless kimono, white garter stockings and off-white sandals. She possesses the "Yaegasumi" magic circuit and has the ability to neutralize the senses of sight, hearing and smell.

== Walpurgis Royal Academy of Machinart ==
=== Gauntlets ===
Frey (フレイ, Furei)
Voiced by: Kana Asumi (Japanese); Lindsay Seidel (English)
A third-year at Walpurgis Royal Academy of Machinart. Her Registration code "Silent Roar" is ranked 99th in the Night Party. She is a clumsy girl with crimson eyes and a hair of a deep pearl color. She wears a curiously long scarf, a garterbelt, and a fluffy ribbon. She has a weak face, withdrawn nature, delicate figure, and large breasts. Her younger brother is Loki.

Rabbi (ラビー, Rabī)
Frey's automaton has the form of a wolf-like dog. When he is in a berserk mode his body increases in size and becomes rather wolf-like. His strength and speed increase as well and he can regenerate his wounds instantly by converting some of Frey's blood.

Alice Bernstein (アリス・バーンスタイン, Arisu Bānsutain)
Voiced by: Risa Taneda (Japanese); Carli Mosier (English)
Chairman of the Night Party Executive Committee. A girl of beautiful appearance with long silver hair. She disguised herself as Cedric to test Raishin and Yaya's abilities. Her registration code "Elf Speeder" and she is ranked 87th in the Night Party.

Shin (シン)
Voiced by: Takahiro Sakurai (Japanese); Vic Mignogna (English)
Alice's automaton and also her butler. He is a fully automated Machine-Doll and attacks using his speed and kicking abilities. His movements are unaffected by inertia or gravity, therefore he is able to accelerate to maximum speed in an instant as well as alter his trajectory in ways impossible to others. His combat abilities are equal to those of Magnus' automata.

Lisette Norden (リゼット・ノルデン, Rizetto Noruden)
Voiced by: Mamiko Noto (Japanese); Jad Saxton (English)
A British puppeteer. Lisette is a student in Walpurgis Royal Academy of Machinart who is a member of the Gauntlets, ranking 34th, with her registration code being White Mist (白い幻霧(ホワイトミスト), Howaito Misuto). She is a member of the Academy's Disciplinary Committee and is Felix Kingsfort's assistant. Lisette has brown-reddish hair and wears a pair of brown eyeglasses together with the Academy's student uniform. She is revealed to be already dead, having been killed by Felix Kingsfort prior to the beginning of the story.

Snow White (スノーホワイト, Sunōho Waito)

Lisette Norden's automaton.

==== Rounds ====
Cedric Granville (セドリック・グランビル, Sedorikku Guranbiru)
Voiced by: Risa Taneda (Japanese); Carli Mosier (English)
Chairman of the Night Party Executive Committee and ranked 10th in the Night Party. A scion of Granville family which, along with Kingsfort name, is a stalwart of the UK. A young handsome boy with dark green hair and violet eyes.
Loki (ロキ, Roki)
Voiced by: Nobuhiko Okamoto (Japanese); Chris Burnett (English)
A second-year puppeteer at Walpurgis Royal Academy of Machinart. His registration code "Sacred Blaze" and is ranked 7th in the Night Party (later voluntarily demoted to 99th). A handsome slender young man with crimson eyes and long silvery hair. He wears a half-length mantle over his shoulder. He can freely manipulate the automaton "Cherubim" which is made of steel and is known to be difficult to operate.

Cherubim (ケルビム, Kerubimu)
Voiced by: Andrew T. Chandler (English)
Loki's automaton. A grotesque-looking automaton that looks like several steel sheets had been crunched together to form a humanoid appearance. Thornlike protrusions cover its body, which is covered with multiple thin edges. The whole body is metallic, giving it a wholly artificial-looking appearance.

Charlotte Belew (シャルロット・ブリュー, Sharurotto Buryū)
Voiced by: Megumi Takamoto (Japanese); Kristin Sutton (English)
A British puppeteer from the Belew House. Charlotte is a student in Walpurgis Royal Academy of Machinart who is a member of the Gauntlets, one of the Rounds, ranking 6th, with her registration code being Tyrant Rex (君臨せし暴虐(タイラントレックス), Tairanto Rekkusu). She has blond hair and wears a blue beret and a brown glove together with the Academy's student uniform. Charlotte is an irritable and impetuous person who often becomes reckless with her actions. She is often not honest with her true thoughts and feelings, often hiding it and or denying it.

Sigmund (シグムント, Shigumunto)
Voiced by: Jōji Nakata (Japanese); David Wald (English)
Charlotte Belew's automaton. Sigmund is a Banned Doll; a dragon with steel coloured scales that has two horns on his forehead and four wings across his back. He is a calm and composed mature dragon. Sigmund possesses the magic circuit, Gram (魔剣(グラム), Guramu), which allows him to annihilate matter.

Felix Kingsfort (フェリクス・キングスフォート, Ferikusu Kingusufōto)
Voiced by: Yūki Kaji (Japanese); Ian Sinclair (English)
A British puppeteer from the House of Kingsfort. Felix is a student in Walpurgis Royal Academy of Machinart who is a member of the Gauntlets, ranking 4th, with his registration code being Valkyria (銀槍の乙女(ヴァルキュリア), Varukyuria). He is the Chairman of the Academy's Disciplinary Committee. Felix has blond hair and wears the Academy's student uniform. He is revealed to be Cannibal Candy (魔術喰い(カニバルキャンディ), Kanibaru Kyandi), the mastermind behind the series of incidents involving the cannibalism of automata in the Academy.

Eliza (エリザ, Eriza)
Voiced by: Mamiko Noto (Japanese); Jad Saxton (English)
Felix's automaton who was made during the Renaissance. She wears armor which looks like a Valkyrie and possesses the "Predator" and "White Mist" magic circuits in addition to many others which she obtained by 'eating' the magic circuits of other automata. She is Cannibal Candy and carried out the attacks on Felix's orders. She is destroyed by Yaya.

Magnus (マグナス, Magunasu)
Voiced by: Yūki Ono (Japanese); Ricco Fajardo (English)
A puppeteer. Magnus is a student in Walpurgis Royal Academy of Machinart who is a member of the Gauntlets, ranking 1st, with his registration code being Marshal (元帥(マーシャル), Māsharu). He has black (dark brown) hair and wears a silver mask and a black cloak together with the Academy's student uniform. Magnus is a calm and composed person. He is being assumed by Raishin Akabane of being his elder brother, Tenzen Akabane, whom he assumes of having killed their clan.

Hotaru (火垂)
Voiced by: Kana Hanazawa (Japanese); Tia Ballard (English)
A maiden-type doll. She is one of Magnus' automata and a Banned Doll made from cells taken from Raishin's younger sister, Nadeshiko. She has long pink hair, has pink eyes and wears a headdress which covers her whole face. The veil has the kanji character "火" on it which means "Fire". She also wears tiny vivid pink ribbons tied into her hair.
Tamamushi (玉虫)
Kamakiri (鎌切)
Kagerou (蜻蛉)
Mitsubachi (蜜蜂)
Himegumo (姫蜘蛛)

=== Other Students ===
Ravenna (ラヴェンナ, Ravenna)
Charlotte's former roommate. She once tried sneak into the bathroom with Charlotte which prompted Charlotte to push her out of the window to protect her secret. During the "Elf Speeder" arc, Alice used her magic to disguise Charlotte as Ravena.

=== Staff ===
Edward Rutherford (エドワード・ラザフォード, Edowādo Razafōdo)
Voiced by: Atsushi Ono (Japanese); Charlie Campbell (English)
Headmaster of Walpurgis Royal Academy of Machinart. His complexion is tan, he has a mustache, and has wrinkles in the outer corners of his eyes. He is splendidly well-built, and even Raishin has no trouble believing that he was once in the army. He was the most powerful magician of the 19th century.
Kimberly (キンバリー, Kinbarī)
Voiced by: Shizuka Itō (Japanese); Kristin McCollum (English)
A mage. Kimberly is a member of Mage's Association's Crusaders who is referred to as Nightingale (鶯(うぐいす), Uguisu) by her fellow Crusaders. She is a professor of Machine Physics in Walpurgis Royal Academy of Machinart who is the head of the Academy's Machine Physics Department. Kimberly has red hair and sometimes wears a pair of silver eyeglasses together with the Academy professor uniform. She is an above first rate mage.
Cruel (クルーエル, Kurūeru)
Voiced by: Junichi Suwabe (Japanese); Christopher Bevins (English)
A doctor at Walpurgis Royal Academy of Machinart. If he were ten years younger, he would be considered a handsome young man. Although he is a skilled doctor, he is less successful when it comes to women. He and Kimberley are old friends.
Avril (アヴリル, Avuriru)
Voiced by: Ayako Kawasumi (Japanese); Mariela Ortiz (English)

== Japanese Army ==
Shouko Karyuusai (花柳斎 硝子, Karyūsai Shōko)
Voiced by: Yukana (Japanese); Clarine Harp (English)
A famous puppet maker whose crafting skills are second to none. A bewitching beauty of wearing kimono aroma of gardenia, pipe and special lens built-in bandage that can visually recognize the flow of magic is a trade-mark. Producer of Japan Guards Division Oborofuji and Setsugetsuka. She was the one who built Yaya, Irori, and Komurasaki whom she labels as her masterpieces. Karyusai, that name was one that resonated throughout the world.

Irori (いろり)
See: Irori

Raishin Akabane (赤羽 雷真, Akabane Raishin)
See: Raishin Akabane

== Divine Works ==
Bronson (ブロンソン, Buronson)
Voiced by: Ken Narita (Japanese); Brandon Potter (English)
The president of Machinart studio Divine Works of up-and-coming and a former contender for the title of Wiseman once called the "Sword Angel" (perhaps his registered code at the time), two decades ago. Loki and Frey adoptive father. A sleek gentleman with long blue hair. Once, he was also one who aspired for the Wiseman's seat. He was defeated somewhere along the road to the Wiseman's seat, and left the Night Party and after that, he founded D-Works.

Lucifer (ルシファー, Rushifā)
Bronson's automaton the golden angel. Just like Cherubim, both its hands has large blades on them and also the magic circuit installed inside him was the "Jet" circuit.

Loki (ロキ, Roki)
See: Loki
Frey (フレイ, Furei)
See: Frey
Yomi (ヨミ)
Voiced by: Miyuki Ichijo (Japanese); Wendy Powell (English)
An automaton of D-Works in the form of a wolf-like dog. She is Rabi's biological mother as well Frey's non-biological mother. Her intelligence, as well as her ability to speak is on par with humans. "Fortunately and Unfortunately" is her favorite phrase. She is a Banned Doll and her body was largely made up of organic parts. She is the prototype of the "Garm" series which Rabi her flesh and blood son belongs to.

== Mage's Association ==
=== Crusaders ===
Kimberly (キンバリー, Kinbarī)
See: Kimberly
Turtledove (山鳩, Yamabato)
Voiced by: Takahiro Fujiwara (Japanese); Kent Williams (English)
Crow (鴉, Karasu)
Voiced by: Taishi Murata (Japanese); Aaron Roberts (English)

== Akabane Clan ==
Tenzen Akabane (赤羽 天全, Akabane Tenzen)
Raishin Akabane (赤羽 雷真, Akabane Raishin)
See: Raishin Akabane
Nadeshiko Akabane (赤羽 撫子, Akabane Nadeshiko)
Voiced by: Kana Hanazawa (Japanese); Tia Ballard (English)
Raishin and Tenzen's younger sister. She was killed by her older brother, Tenzen, who eviscerated Nadeshiko to create "God".

== House of Belew ==
Charlotte Belew (シャルロット・ブリュー, Sharurotto Buryū)
See: Charlotte Belew

Alfred (アルフレッド, Arufureddo)

Henriette Belew (アンリエット・ブリュー, Anrietto Buryū)
Voiced by: Asuka Nishi (Japanese); Monica Rial (English)
A transfer student, and later Crewell's lab assistant, and also Charlotte's sister who looks exactly like her except with flaxen hair. She has a larger size of breasts compared to Charlotte and is the only thing she gets jealous of. She was the past owner of the dog automaton, Alfred, that triggered the house of Belew to fall. After the incident, she gained trauma about dogs. She made several suicide attempts during her first appearance. It is later revealed in ploy of Alice that transformed into Cedric that she attempted suicide so that Charlotte would not be forced to assassinate the Headmaster in order for her to be kept alive by Alice.

== House of Kingsfort ==
Walter Kingsfort (ウォルター・キングスフォート, Worutā Kingusufōto)

Felix Kingsfort (フェリクス・キングスフォート, Ferikusu Kingusufōto)
See: Felix Kingsfort
