= Adachitoka =

Pen name of the Noragami series creative duo

- あだちとか
- Born: Adachi, Tokashiki; December 14, November 28; Murayama, Yamagata, Naha
- Occupation: Manga artist
- Writing career
- Years active: 2003–present
- Notable work: Noragami

Adachitoka (あだちとか) is the collective pen name used by female manga artists Adachi (あだち; born December 14) and Tokashiki (とかしき; born November 28). The former draws the foreground and characters, while the latter draws the backgrounds.

The duo started out as assistants to Motohiro Kato, before being put in charge of illustrations on Alive: The Final Evolution. Following that series' completion, they began Noragami, which was serialized from 2010 to 2024. Their next series, The Wolf at Memory's End, began serialization in 2026.

== Biography ==
Adachitoka is made up of Adachi, who was born on December 14 in Murayama, Yamagata, and Tokashiki, who was born on November 28 in Naha. After graduating from college, they moved to Tokyo and submitted their work to the Monthly Jump editorial department. They rejected it, but told them to submit it to the Monthly Afternoon department instead. After a lack of response, they decided to submit for the Monthly Shōnen Magazine award. After that, they worked as an assistant to Motohiro Kato.

The pair debuted in 2003 with the illustrations for the manga series Alive: The Final Evolution. The series was serialized in Monthly Shōnen Magazine until 2010. An anime television series adaptation was announced, but later canceled following Gonzo's delisting from the Tokyo Stock Exchange.

Following the completion of Alive: The Final Evolution in 2010, they were out of work. When getting ideas for a new series, they went back to a one-shot they had previously written. The result was Noragami, which was serialized in Monthly Shōnen Magazine from December 2010 to January 2024. The series was nominated for the Kodansha Manga Award in 2014 and 2016, and received an anime television series adaptation, which ran for two seasons. In 2020, they wrote a manga series as part of a collaboration by multiple Japanese companies to stop piracy. Their next series, The Wolf at Memory's End, began serialization in Monthly Shōnen Magazine in October 2026.

== Works ==
- Alive: The Final Evolution (アライブ -最終 進化的 少年-, Araibu - Saishū Shinkateki Shōnen) (2003–2010) (serialized in Monthly Shōnen Magazine; story by Tadashi Kawashima)
- Noragami (ノラガミ) (2010–2024) (serialized in Monthly Shōnen Magazine)
- The Wolf at Memory's End (やどやのお犬さま, Yadoya no Oinu-sama) (2026–present) (serialized in Monthly Shōnen Magazine)
