= Noragami =

Japanese manga series

- Noragami: Stray God
- First tankōbon volume cover, featuring Yato (left) and Hiyori Iki (right), along with Yukine in his sword form (middle)

ノラガミ
- Genre: Action; Supernatural; Urban fantasy
- Manga
- Written by: Adachitoka
- Published by: Kodansha
- English publisher: NA: Kodansha USA
- Imprint: Monthly Shōnen Magazine Comics
- Magazine: Monthly Shōnen Magazine
- Original run: December 6, 2010 – January 6, 2024
- Volumes: 27 + 3 extras
- Anime television series
- Directed by: Kotaro Tamura
- Produced by: Naoki Amano; Toshiaki Dōshita; Shin Furukawa; Tomokazu Iizumi; Kōta Kuroda; Gaku Nakagawa; Yuri Terao; Yōko Tanaka
- Written by: Deko Akao
- Music by: Taku Iwasaki
- Studio: Bones
- Licensed by: Crunchyroll (Note: In North America through Crunchyroll, LLC (formerly known as Funimation).)
- Original network: Tokyo MX, MBS, BS11, TVA
- Original run: January 5, 2014 – March 23, 2014
- Episodes: 12 + 2 OVAs
- Anime television series

Noragami Aragoto
- Directed by: Kotaro Tamura
- Produced by: Naoki Amano; Tōru Asō; Tetsuya Endo; Toshio Iizuka; Tomokazu Iizumi; Yukihiro Ito; Kōta Kuroda; Gaku Nakagawa; Yōko Tanaka; Yuri Terao; Tsutomu Yanagimura
- Written by: Deko Akao
- Music by: Taku Iwasaki
- Studio: Bones
- Licensed by: Crunchyroll
- Original network: Tokyo MX, MBS, BS Fuji, RKK, AT-X
- Original run: October 2, 2015 – December 25, 2015
- Episodes: 13 + 2 OVAs
- icon

Noragami: Stray God (ノラガミ, Noragami) is a Japanese manga series written and illustrated by the manga artist duo Adachitoka. It was serialized in Kodansha's shōnen manga magazine Monthly Shōnen Magazine from December 2010 to January 2024, with its chapters collected in 27 tankōbon volumes. The manga is licensed for English release in North America by Kodansha USA.

The story revolves around a minor god named Yato, who is down on his luck and struggling to gain followers. One day, a high school girl named Hiyori Iki saves Yato from an oncoming bus, but ends up getting hit herself. The incident causes her soul to become loose from her body, leading her to experience an out-of-body existence. Hiyori seeks Yato's help to return her to normal, and in the process, she becomes involved in the world of gods, spirits, and the afterlife.

A 12-episode anime television series adaptation produced by Bones was broadcast from January to March 2014. A 13-episode second season, titled Noragami Aragoto, was broadcast from October to December 2015. Both series are licensed in English by Crunchyroll.

By February 2024, the manga had over 8 million copies in circulation. The series has been well-received, with critics praising its plot, worldbuilding and characters.

== Plot ==
Hiyori Iki was a normal middle school student until she was involved in a bus accident while trying to protect a stranger. This incident causes her soul to frequently slip out of her body, and she becomes aware of the existence of two parallel worlds: the Near Shore, where regular humans and creatures reside, and the Far Shore, where phantoms (demonic beasts) and human souls linger. Through her soul, she meets the strange, nameless god without a shrine, Yato. Yato is determined to make a name for himself out there by accepting any wish for 5 yen, including Hiyori's to fix her body. Alongside Yato's Shinki (神器) (Note: 'Regalia' in the anime's English dub)—a weapon forged from the spirit of a deceased human's soul—named Yukine, the trio go through many adventures struggling with their friendship, identity, and pasts.

== Media ==
=== Manga ===
Written and illustrated by the manga artist duo Adachitoka, Noragami was serialized in Kodansha's shōnen manga magazine Monthly Shōnen Magazine from December 6, 2010, to January 6, 2024. Kodansha collected its chapters into 27 individual tankōbon volumes, released from July 15, 2011, to February 16, 2024.

Extra chapters were published in the spin-off magazine Monthly Shōnen Magazine+ starting on October 20, 2011. Seven of these chapters were collected in a single volume, titled Noragami: Stray Stories (ノラガミ拾遺集, Noragami Shūishū), on November 15, 2013, while other extra chapters were included as add-on content to the limited edition of the 20th volume, released on February 15, 2019, and to the limited edition of the 24th volume, released on October 15, 2021.

For the 50th anniversary of Monthly Shōnen Magazine, a 14-volume shinsōban edition of Noragami was released from December 17, 2024, to July 16, 2025.

In North America, the manga was licensed for English release by Kodansha USA in 2014. The 27 volumes were released from September 2, 2014, to December 10, 2024. Noragami: Stray Stories was released on December 1, 2015. Kodansha USA released a nine-volume omnibus edition, with each volume containing three of the original ones, from September 13, 2022, to August 19, 2025.

=== Anime ===
An anime television series adaptation was announced in June 2013. It was directed by Kotaro Tamura and produced by Bones, with character designs from Toshihiro Kawamoto. Prior to its television premiere, the first episode was screened at 2013's Anime Festival Asia on November 10, 2013. The series was broadcast for 13 episodes on Tokyo MX, MBS, BS11, and TVA from January 5 to March 23, 2014. Two additional original animation DVDs (OADs) were bundled with the limited edition of the 10th and 11th manga volumes, respectively released on February 17 and July 17, 2014.

A second season, titled Noragami Aragoto (ノラガミ ARAGOTO), was broadcast from October 3 to December 26, 2015. (Note: Tokyo MX listed the air dates for the series on Friday at 25:05, which is effectively Saturday at 1:05 a.m. JST.) Two OADs were bundled with the limited edition of the 15th and 16th manga volumes, respectively released on November 17, 2015, and March 17, 2016.

In North America, both series were licensed by Funimation. They released Noragami on DVD and Blu-ray on July 7, 2015, while Noragami Aragoto was released on February 21, 2017. Following the announcement that Funimation would be unified under the Crunchyroll brand, the series was moved to its platform in 2022. Madman Entertainment licensed the anime for distribution in Australia and New Zealand.

==== Music ====
The music for the series was composed by Taku Iwasaki. Two original soundtrack albums were released by Avex on February 19, 2014, and March 25, 2016; the second album was originally released on November 25, 2015, but the Noragami Aragoto production committee halted shipments and recalled the discs from stores following a controversy surrounding an improper usage of sounds related to Islam.

The opening theme for Noragami is "Goya no Machiawase" (午夜の待ち合わせ; "Overnight Appointment"), by Hello Sleepwalkers, while the ending theme is "Heart Realize" (ハートリアライズ, Hāto Riaraizu), with composition by Supercell and performed by Tia. The opening theme song for Noragami Aragoto is "Kyōran Hey Kids!!" (狂乱 Hey Kids!!) by The Oral Cigarettes, and the ending theme song is "Nirvana" (ニルバナ, Nirubana) by Tia.

=== Drama CD ===
The limited edition of the ninth volume of the manga was bundled with a drama CD, released on December 17, 2013.

=== Video game ===
A mobile game, titled Noragami: Kami to Enishi (ノラガミ—神ト縁—; lit. 'Noragami: Gods and Fate'), was released by developer Sakurasoft for Android devices on October 29, 2015; an iOS version became available on November 14 of that same year.

== Reception ==
=== Manga ===
Noragami was the 14th top selling manga series in Japan during the first half of 2014, with over 1.8 million copies sold. By August 2018, the manga had over 6.3 million copies in circulation. By February 2024, it had over 8 million copies in circulation.

It was nominated for the 38th Kodansha Manga Award in the shōnen category in 2014.

Rebecca Silverman of Anime News Network praised the first volume's setup, characters, and artwork, though she found the opening chapter "fairly weak" and noted some plot devices were underutilized. She highlighted its "other-worldly feel", humor, and engaging use of Shinto mythology, calling it "one of those books that reads faster than you expect". Ross Locksley of UK Anime Network compared the first chapter unfavorably to Rumiko Takahashi's Rin-ne and Clamp's xxxHolic, though his opinion improved after the third chapter. He likened Adachitoka's art to Takeshi Obata's work in Death Note, concluding that the volume was "an uneven start for Noragami, but overall a positive one."

Matthew Warner of The Fandom Post commended the story and artwork, particularly praising the backgrounds as the standout visual element. He noted its "nice bit of Japanese folklore" and likable protagonists, calling the first volume "a solid start." Similarly, Danica Davidson of Otaku USA described it as "a cute start with a nice mixture of supernatural and fun."

=== Anime ===
Theron Martin of Anime News Network praised the series's story, visuals, and balance of comedy and drama, though he criticized the final three episodes as "anticlimactic". He drew comparisons to Beyond the Boundary and noted thematic parallels between the God/Regalia dynamic and the Meister/Weapon relationship in Soul Eater, while emphasizing their fundamental differences. Martin concluded that while Noragami excels at its best, it "tapers off too much at the end and rushes its last arc." Gabriella Ekens, writing for the same website, highlighted the series's worldbuilding and characters, calling Yato one of the main reasons why the series works. She described it as a blend of shōnen and shōjo elements, positioning it between shrine-focused stories like Gingitsune and Kamisama Kiss and supernatural action titles like Bleach, while also noting similarities to Inuyasha and Soul Eater. Ekens praised it as "solid, all-around, well-constructed entertainment" with broad appeal.

Chris Beveridge of The Fandom Post lauded studio Bones' adaptation, particularly its worldbuilding and action choreography, which he felt elevated the source material. He called the series "an appealing show that knows how to work its magic", praising its strong presentation. Sheena McNeil of Sequential Tart commended its natural blend of drama, humor, and emotional depth, calling it "a powerful anime" with lasting impact. Kyle Mills of DVD Talk praised the characters and humor, noting its lighthearted tone despite occasional dramatic beats. While critical of the arc-based structure and underdeveloped antagonist, he deemed it "immensely entertaining" with rich worldbuilding and well-developed characters.

IGN included Noragami in its list of the best anime series of the 2010s.
