= List of Heroman episodes =

Heroman is an anime television series produced by Stan Lee alongside Bones, POW! Entertainment and Wowmax Media that aired on TV Tokyo and related stations between April 1, 2010, and September 23, 2010, as well as streaming on the Crunchyroll Internet service.

For the first 12 episodes, the opening theme was "Roulette" performed by Tetsuya, of L'Arc-en-Ciel and the ending theme was "CALLING" performed by Flow. Beginning with episode 13, the opening theme changed to "missing" performed by Kylee and the ending theme changed to "Boku no Te wa Kimi no Tame ni" (僕の手は君の為に; "My Hands For You") performed by Mass Alert. In addition to these songs, an insert song titled "Niji no Fumoto" (虹のふもと; "At the Edge of the Rainbow") performed by Aco was featured in episode 11.

== List of episodes ==
No.	Title	Original release date
1	"Beginning"; Transliteration: "Biginingu" (Japanese: ビギニング)	April 1, 2010
Far out in space, aliens receive a transmission produced by the Earth man Professor Matthew Denton, and decide to head towards Earth to invade it. Meanwhile, in Center City on the West Coast of the United States, teenager Joey Jones is having problems being bullied by the football player Will, who has a problem with him hanging around his sister, Lina. Later, he and his friend Psy catch one of the bullies, Nick, playing with a toy robot called a Heybo. When it gets hit by a car, Nick abandons it, saying his father could easily buy him a new one, so Joey, who cannot afford one himself, decides to take it home and fix it, naming it Heroman. After a few days, a strange phenomenon caused by the arrival of the aliens in the Solar System causes a huge thunderstorm. A lightning bolt hits Heroman, transforming it into a massive robot, while a device also forms around Joey's wrist. At the same time, another lightning bolt causes a traffic accident that Lina and her father get involved in. Using the device, Joey manages to get his feelings across to Heroman, who saves Lina and her father from the wreckage before an explosion occurs. Meanwhile, the aliens prepare to arrive on the Earth. Stan Lee has an animated cameo in the coffee shop where Joey works.
2	"Encounter"; Transliteration: "Enkauntā" (Japanese: エンカウンター)	April 8, 2010
Joey starts to get to grips with how Heroman responds to his controller, wondering if he is able to handle such power himself. He asks Psy for advice on the matter, who says it is his decision on how he uses it. The next day, three of the aliens, known as Skrugg, land in Center City and start attacking, searching for Denton. They later encounter Denton and announce they plan to capture him and destroy Earth. Realizing both Denton and Lina are in trouble, Joey summons out Heroman to battle the Skrugg. When Lina gets blown away by the Skrugg's attack, the controller gives Joey extra speed to safely catch her. Working together, Joey and Heroman manage to defeat the Skrugg. However, before they can celebrate victory, a UFO arrives.
3	"Invasion"; Transliteration: "Inveijon" (Japanese: インヴェイジョン)	April 15, 2010
The UFO deploys an army of Skrugg that start attacking the city, proving too powerful for even the military. Having decided on the difference in power, the Skrugg set up a base over an oil plant. Joey is worried about his grandma, so Psy joins him to check on her while Lina and the others take shelter at the city hall. However, Will is unwilling to acknowledge Joey as a hero and decides to go with Nick in order to infiltrate the Skrugg's spaceship. As Skrugg approach Grandma Jones' place, Joey sends out Heroman who defeats them using his new mode, Heroman Blast. Joey and Psy are relieved to see Grandma Jones safe and sound, listening to her records and unaware of the chaos in the streets. However, the Skrugg leader, Gogorr, sends a message to the entire world claiming that the planet Earth now belongs to them.
4	"Sphere"; Transliteration: "Tama" (Japanese: タマ)	April 22, 2010
Will and Nick infiltrate the Skrugg base with the intention of stealing their weapons. After dropping Grandma at the shelter, Joey and Psy visit Denton who has been studying the Skrugg's weapons and believes Heroman is the only force powerful enough to defeat them. Will and Nick find a weapon but are soon captured by the Skurggs. The Skrugg then unleash a large metal sphere that heads towards the shelter. Joey summons out Heroman, but his attacks seem to be ineffective against the sphere. They manage to trap the sphere in a large hole, but it manages to climb out of it. Heroman doesn't give up, continuing his attempts to stop the sphere until his fists are destroyed. Relaying these feelings to Joey, he activates a new mode, Heroman Augment, which grows Heroman into a giant, giving him the strength to hold back the sphere until everyone is evacuated. When Gogorr spots Heroman and identifies him as a possible threat, he launches several more spheres.
5	"Assassins"; Transliteration: "Asashinzu" (Japanese: アサシンズ)	April 29, 2010
As Gogorr sees Heroman and asks himself how humans have that kind of power, Will and Nick are taken to a chamber filled with the uninhabited shells of Skrugg. Back at the laboratory, Joey, Psy and Denton try to come up with a plan to stop the Skrugg. Denton theorizes that the Skrugg will be susceptible to sound waves, and gives Psy a guitar with an amplifier to use as a weapon. Joey, Psy and Heroman head out to fight the Skrugg, hoping to gain an advantage in the shadows, finding Lina along the way and taking her with them. New Skrugg appear, leading the soldiers in an attack on the team. In the ensuing fight, Heroman breaks off the helmet of one of them-and it turns out to be a brainwashed Will.
6	"Backlash"; Transliteration: "Bakkurasshu" (Japanese: バックラッシュ)	May 6, 2010
Upon discovering the enemy is Will, along with Nick, Lina calls out to him which affects his brainwashing, giving the group a chance to escape. Meanwhile, military helicopters try to stop the metal spheres, with no results, and both Denton and the military determine that they are heading towards specific targets around the world, including the White House. The military suggests to the president that they use nuclear weapons to stop it. After noticing the spheres patterns, the group determine that the spheres are being controlled by the UFO. While getting some supplies, Joey, Lina and Heroman are attacked by a Skrugg Cone, which Heroman manages to defeat. As the gang decide to head towards the UFO, the president is approached by a strange man named Doctor Minami.
7	"Resistance"; Transliteration: "Rejisutansu" (Japanese: レジスタンス)	May 13, 2010
Joey and the others infiltrate the Skrugg factory via the sewers. Denton and Psy head for the controls while Joey and Heroman create a distraction, with Lina joining up with him. Meanwhile, Doctor Minami suggests that the president hold off a nuclear strike in order to obtain the spheres for the USA. Joey's group soon encounters Will and Nick and lead them to where the spheres are produced. With Lina's help, Joey and Heroman manage to remove Will and Nick's helmets in order to break Will free of his brainwashing. However, Nick is unaffected, relishing the power he has gotten, and attacks Lina, forcing Will to defend her. Realizing the mind control was a failure, Gogorr sets the sphere room to self-destruct, causing rubble to fall on everyone.
8	"Combat"; Transliteration: "Konbatto" (Japanese: コンバット)	May 20, 2010
As Doctor Minami's team prepares to head out to stop the sphere, Denton and Psy arrive at the base, where they are discovered by the enemy but manage to escape thanks to Denton's improvements to Psy's guitar. Meanwhile, as Joey's group recover from the rubble, Joey leaves Will in Lina's care while he and Heroman head towards Denton's group. Irritated, Gogorr goes to fight Denton and Psy himself, and proves himself to be more than a match. They are rescued by the arrival of Joey and Heroman. Gogorr transforms into a more powerful form which manages to outmatch Heroman's speed. Joey joins the fight and uses his super speed ability to even the odds. However, Gogorr attacks Joey when he lets his guard down and knocks him unconscious.
9	"Alive"; Transliteration: "Araibu" (Japanese: アライブ)	May 27, 2010
Doctor Minami's crew prepare a machine called the MR-1 Prototype to fight against the ball. Meanwhile, Joey, despite his injuries, continues to help Heroman, but ends up taking more brutal hits from Gogorr. Heroman becomes infuriated and grows flames, unleashing his rage upon Gogorr, ripping off his wings and unleashing large blasts. Joey awakes and finds his controller isn't responding, he pleads with Heroman to stop him from killing Gogorr, returning him to normal. Gogorr resumes his attack, but is beaten by Heroman's Blast mode. Unable to accept defeat, Gogorr sets the base to self-destruct. Joey's group hurries to the control room in order to stop the spheres before Doctor Minami gets a chance to use his machine. With their job completed, they barely manage to escape from the base before it explodes. While Doctor Minami becomes infuriated over who interfered with his plan, a red eyeball is shown at ground zero.
10	"Approach"; Transliteration: "Apurōchi" (Japanese: アプローチ)	June 3, 2010
As peace returns to Center City, the President is shown evidence concerning Heroman, who has been secretly help rebuild the city. Lina, who is depressed over Will leaving town due to his current state, tries to ask Joey out on a date, but keeps getting interrupted at every turn. A man by the name of Hughes questions Joey on rumors about Heroman. That night, some men kidnap Lina in front of Joey, forcing him and Heroman to take action. As Joey takes Lina back home, she is finally able to portray her request for a date. Meanwhile Axel Hughes, a secret agent for the president, reports the authenticity of Heroman.
11	"Menace"; Transliteration: "Menasu" (Japanese: メナス)	June 10, 2010
As Agent Hughes continues his investigation concerning Heroman, Joey is visited by his energetic big sister, Holly, who had come back from her band tour to check out the alien situation in Center City, albeit three months late. Deciding to crash for a few days, Holly soon makes Joey's life a living hell for him. Hughes meets up with Doctor Minami to ask why he is around in Center City. Later, an explosion occurs and Joey and Heroman investigate, but it turns out to be a trap laid out by Hughes. Joey and Heroman run off and Hughes catches up with them until Heroman breaks some rubble that was about to fall on him and escapes under the cover of dust, though Holly manages to catch a glimpse of him. After they reunite, Holly plays a song at the pier before revealing she intends to stay longer, having seen something interesting.
12	"Stalkers"; Transliteration: "Sutōkāzu" (Japanese: ストーカーズ)	June 17, 2010
As Joey goes on his date with Lina, they are stalked by Psy, Denton and Holly. As the date carries onto the beach, Joey's math teacher, Vera Collins, inadvertently joins the stalking. Joey later catches onto their game and eludes them, only for the date to be interrupted by a report of Doctor Minami's MR-1 Prototype going out of control. Joey sends Heroman after the robot, who is actually being controlled by Doctor Minami to lure him out. Heroman manages to defeat the machine, but is caught on camera by a news helicopter in the process. As Joey returns to Lina, he gets Heroman to give them an unorthodox ride on the Ferris Wheel. Meanwhile Hughes, who had been watching the battle, discovers Joey on the scene.
13	"Getaway"; Transliteration: "Gettawei" (Japanese: ゲッタウェイ)	June 24, 2010
Early one morning, a group of NIA troops, led by Hughes, enter Joey's house in search of him. Eight hours earlier, Joey was warned by Denton and got Holly to help him escape. After meeting up with Denton and Psy, they reveal that the government had been investigating Heroman, and covered up the previous day's incident to make Heroman look like the bad guy. With very little options, Joey, Denton and Psy prepare to leave the city and head towards Nevada. Meanwhile, the reporters for the All America Network who shot yesterday's footage are annoyed that their report has been twisted to the government's will. With police checkpoints all over the city, Joey and Heroman distract the majority of the cops, Denton and Psy push through the remainder. However, Joey and Heroman are then spotted by Hughes in a helicopter, but manage to lose them in an abandoned mine shaft.
14	"Beleaguer"; Transliteration: "Birīgā" (Japanese: ビリーガー)	July 1, 2010
While stopping at a diner, Joey and crew learn from the news that they are being searched for, forcing them to be careful about shopping for supplies, despite Joey's complaints about the government's continuous cover up stories. While at a grocery store, Joey decides to call Lina, unaware that Hughes had managed to trace his call and is able to track Denton's vehicle. The group soon finds themselves against the military again, forcing Joey and Heroman to once again distract them, before Denton hacks their satellite surveillance to escape. However, they are spotted by Hughes, who manage to capture Denton while Joey and Psy escape into the woods. At a disadvantage due to his disability, Psy sends Joey ahead while he distracts the guards. However, Joey is soon confronted in person by Hughes.
15	"Revolt"; Transliteration: "Rivoruto" (Japanese: リヴォルト)	July 8, 2010
Hughes decides to try and talk with Joey, hearing his side of the story and coming to understand him. However, before Hughes can call the attack off, Doctor Minami blocks off his communications and usurps command of the operation. Needing to stay alive to get the word out, Hughes asks Joey for Heroman's assistance in holding the military off. Doctor Minami starts attacking with his MR-1 robot equipped with an EMP cannon, taking advantage of Heroman's lack of long range attacks. Hughes successfully manages to contact the president and order a halt of the hostilities. However, Doctor Minami uses this as an opportunity to hit Heroman with the EMP.
16	"Decision"; Transliteration: "Deshijon" (Japanese: デシジョン)	July 15, 2010
Heroman is unaffected by the EMP, having been born from electricity itself, and goes into battle against Doctor Minami again, closing the distance between them. Doctor Minami uses an EMP to bring down Hughes' helicopters. The ANN news copter arrives on the scenes and performs a live broadcast, shining light on the truth. The battle transfers over to a dam where Heroman manages to throw MR-1 off, but gets dragged down with it. MR-1's recommenced attach starts to damage the dam, so Heroman risks himself to protect it. Hughes activates the dam's power generator so Heroman can recover energy, giving him the power to destroy MR-1. Doctor Minami is arrested and the charges on Joey and his friends are dropped. Outside of the city, however, a cloaked figure waits and watches...
17	"Legacy"; Transliteration: "Regashī" (Japanese: レガシー)	July 22, 2010
Denton discovers traces of someone who has been destroying certain secret research labs, which he believes were researching Skrugg technology. Noticing the direction of the attacks, Denton believes he will come to the school next due to the Skrugg remnants he still has. That night, Joey, Psy and Denton camp out in the school hall and await for the attacker to arrive. A warning signal comes but it turns out to be Collins, forcing Joey to try and hide Heroman from her. Back in the hall, the mysterious attacker bursts through the wall and attacks Psy and Denton until Joey and Heroman arrive to fight him. The attacker turns out to be Will, who had developed further into his Skrugg mutation and has become determined to destroy all traces of Skrugg technology left on Earth. After destroying the Skrugg remnants Denton had, he leaves. While Joey and the others try and think how to deal with the situation, Collins stumbles onto Heroman.
18	"Separation"; Transliteration: "Separēshon" (Japanese: セパレーション)	July 29, 2010
Hughes arranges everyone to go to an uninhabited island for an undisturbed vacation. After swimming in the beach and having a barbecue, Psy tells them a ghost story he heard from an NIA agent about a demon called the Shapeshifter. When some of the aspects of his story start coming true, everyone starts getting worried. Just then, an injured scientist named Ravi arrives at their lodge, warning them to escape from the island. Suddenly, a mass of strange vines appears and trashes the lodge, separating Joey from the others. Joey manages to find Lina and save her from drowning, and after drying off in a cave, they begin searching for the others. After running into Ravi, they are attacked by more vines.
19	"Survival"; Transliteration: "Sabaibaru" (Japanese: サバイバル)	August 5, 2010
With Heroman nowhere to be found, Joey protects Lina and Ravi from the vines himself by using his speed to tangle them up. Ravi explains that the monster is a result of a biological weapons experiment that went out of control. They decide to head towards the research laboratory in order to destroy its core. They briefly encounter one of vines simulating vocal cords to communicate, before finding Collins. They then climb to a high point in order to locate Heroman, later finding him entangled in vines, his energy being absorbed by them. Joey rescues him by reverting him to Toy Mode, before being reunited with Denton and Psy. Upon reaching the research lab, Joey, Heroman and Ravi head inside and reach the core, which is protected by several vines taking Heroman's form, soon trapping him again, but Joey manages to once again make use of his Toy Mode to destroy the core, killing all the vines. With the danger gone, the guys make the most of the remainder of their vacation.
20	"Missing"; Transliteration: "Misshingu" (Japanese: ミッシング)	August 12, 2010
Denton decides to investigate a series of abductions that have recently taken place. When Denton doesn't come back, Holly decides to take Joey and Psy on an 'investigation', which turns out to just be a trip to the beach. Later on, they visit a girl whose father was abducted and learn more about its attacker. After finding a dead flower in the desert, they are attacked by the culprit, who Joey initially suspects to be Will, forcing him and Heroman to fight against it. When Holly tries looking for Joey, she ends up being captured.
21	"Emotion"; Transliteration: "Emōshon" (Japanese: エモーション)	August 19, 2010
With no leads on where the culprit took Holly, Joey wonders if Will really is the culprit. While searching Denton's lab, they find his soil samples, which reports an unknown chemical. Relaying this to Hughes' team, they manage to find the culprit's hideout in an abandoned coal mine. Noticing Joey's hesitation, Psy tells him about when he was in the football team with Will, including the incident where he broke his leg. Although it was an incident Psy brought upon himself, Will felt guilty about it, reassuring Joey that he's not someone who would hurt people. Joey, Psy and Heroman head inside the mine, where they find a strange plant where all the kidnapped people are encased in, as well as meeting up with Denton and Holly. They then fight the culprit, who is not Will but a new breed of Skrugg. Psy leads a dog shaped Skrugg out of mine into Hughes' squad's firing range, before Heroman returns to finish it. They manage to rescue all the captured people, but Psy succumbs to the injuries he received from the Skrugg. Meanwhile, another figure heads towards Lina's house.
22	"Memories"; Transliteration: "Memorīzu" (Japanese: メモリーズ)	August 26, 2010
Joey remembers tales his mother had told him about his father, Brian, who sacrificed his life to save some coal miners from a fire. When Holly implies that Brian wasn't really a hero, Joey is reassured by some of the diner patrons who remembered him. However, Holly still insists he wasn't a hero, which makes Joey angry. The previous night, Lina was visited by Will, who warns her not to get involved with Joey. Visiting his parents' graves the next day, Joey asks Holly, who tells him she felt betrayed by her father for leaving his family behind. Joey remembers one of Brian's habits he was told about and checks the helmet he left behind, finding a photo of the family together, proving that he always had them on his mind. Soon afterward, Joey is approached by Lina's father, who tells her Lina had run off following an argument over Will. Joey finds her on the beach and tells her he won't waver anymore, which unlocks a new ability for Heroman. Just then, they receive a shocking call from Denton.
23	"Sortie"; Transliteration: "Soruti" (Japanese: ソルティ)	September 2, 2010
Denton and Hughes reveal that the recent events are connected with the remnants of the Skrugg. Meanwhile, some surviving Skrugg attack the White House, retrieving a remnant from a secret laboratory in the bunker. Before flying over to the scene, Joey goes to talk with Lina, who is angry at him for not telling her about his encounter with Will. However, Joey mans up and tells Lina something before heading off on the helicopter to his private flight to Washington. Filled with emotion, Lina decides to sneak out of her house. Joey and Heroman, equipped with a new armor developed by the NIA, arrive in Washington and fight their way through the hordes of Skrugg drones on their way to the White House. Meanwhile, Will discovers the Skrugg's true goal; to resurrect Gogorr, but is attacked by a mysterious enemy.
24	"Resurrection"; Transliteration: "Rizarekushon" (Japanese: リザレクション)	September 9, 2010
As Joey and Heroman make their way towards the White House, Plant X tentacles start to spread throughout the city. Meanwhile, Denton, Psy, Lina and Holly arrive in Washington with several bomber jets intended to supply Heroman with additional energy. As the All American Network cover Heroman's attack, even refusing to evacuate when asked, and broadcast Joey to the world. Holly becomes furious having not been told Joey was involved in fighting. Just then, a huge Skrugg dish appears in the center of the city, and spheres from before fly over to it. Joey and Heroman arrive at the White House just as Gogorr is resurrected.
25	"Crisis"; Transliteration: "Kuraishisu" (Japanese: クライシス)	September 16, 2010
As Joey and Heroman begin their battle with Gogorr, bombers drop bombs which form storm clouds to provide Heroman with extra electricity, with Denton utilizing the MR-1 Prototype to assist. Gogorr then absorbs the spheres, transforming him further, and begins to devour everything, including his fellow Skruggs. Joey finds and rescues Will, who joins him in fighting for the same goal. Heroman breaks the crystal on Gogorr's chest, thought to be his weak point, but Gogorr survives and impales Heroman.
26	"Faith"; Transliteration: "Feisu" (Japanese: フェイス)	September 23, 2010
As Joey becomes distraught by Heroman's injury, Gogorr attacks him before beginning to dig towards the center of the Earth in order to devour and eventually destroy it. Will protects Joey from Gogorr's attack and encourages him to do what's right. Joey's controller glows red and extends over his arm, giving him further power, and he decides to go alone to try and destroy the sphere of light underneath Gogorr. Before Joey can perform his suicide attack, he is stopped by Heroman and is later confronted by Holly and Lina, who tell him not to throw away his life so easily and remind him that he's a hero because of his friends. After Heroman is recharged by the MR-1, Joey activates his new ability, O-Spark, which destroys Gogorr. As Joey and his friends enjoy the future that awaits them, Minami is broken out of prison.

== Bonus Episodes ==
Bonus shorts were included on certain DVD releases.

No.	Title	Original release date
EX–01	"Portent"; Transliteration: "Pōtento" (Japanese: ポーテント)	TBA
On the day before the series starts, Joey stumbles upon a picture of Holly that he scribbled on when Holly went on her tour. After wiping it off, Joey delivers a part to Denton, who is finishing his extra terrestrial communications satellite.
EX–02	"Promise"; Transliteration: "Puromisu" (Japanese: プロミス)	TBA
Following her date with Joey in episode 12, Lina takes a bath and has a dream involving Will.
