= Tetsu Shiratori =

Japanese voice actor (born 1972)

- 白鳥 哲
- Born: March 21, 1972 (age 54); Tokyo, Japan
- Occupations: Actor; voice actor
- Years active: 1998–present

Tetsu Shiratori (白鳥 哲, Shiratori Tetsu; born March 21, 1972) is a Japanese voice actor. He is well known for his role as Lloyd Asplund (Code Geass), Gluttony (Fullmetal Alchemist: Brotherhood) and Zancrow (Fairy Tail).

== Filmography ==
=== Anime ===
1998

- Brain Powerd (Yuu Isami)

1999

- Infinite Ryvius (Kouji Aiba)

2000

- Boogiepop Phantom (Yasushi Sanada)

2001

- S-CRY-ed (Kyouji Mujyou)

2002

- SaiKano (Atsushi)
- Mobile Suit Gundam SEED (Sai Argyle)

2003

- Wolf's Rain (Retriever)
- Texhnolyze (Messenger, Representative from Class)
- Fullmetal Alchemist (Kain Fuery)

2004

- Gankutsuou: The Count of Monte Cristo (Beauchamp)
- Mobile Suit Gundam SEED Destiny (Narrator, Sai Argyle)

2005

- GUNxSWORD (Researcher)
- Full Metal Panic! The Second Raid (Woo)

2006

- xxxHOLiC (Spirit)
- La Corda D'Oro: primo passo (Concours Judge)
- Code Geass: Lelouch of the Rebellion (Lloyd Asplund)
- Strain: Strategic Armored Infantry (Cedi)

2007

- Polyphonica (Yokio)
- Moribito: Guardian of the Spirit (Rice Store's Young Master)
- Blue Dragon (Deathroy)

2008

- Blue Dragon (Desuroi)
- Code Geass: Lelouch of the Rebellion R2 (Lloyd Asplund)
- Slayers Revolution (Sorcerer)
- Mobile Suit Gundam 00 Second Season (Andrei Smirnov)

2009

- Clannad After Story (Employee)
- Fullmetal Alchemist: Brotherhood (Gluttony, Han)

2010

- Demon King Daimao (Yata-garasu)

2011

- Fairy Tail (Zancrow)
- Blade (Tanaka)

2012

- The Knight in the Area (Leonardo Silva)
- Horizon in the Middle of Nowhere (Felipe Segundo)

2017

- Digimon Universe: Appli Monsters (Fakemon)

2018

- Free! Dive to the Future (Kurimiya Kon)

2020

- Cagaster of an Insect Cage (Mercantile District Head)

=== Games ===
- Sengoku Basara 3 (2010) (Mogami Yoshiaki)
- Super Robot Wars series (2003–) (Andrei Smirnov)

=== Films ===
- Fullmetal Alchemist the Movie: Conqueror of Shamballa (2005) (Kain Fuery)
- Code Geass Lelouch of the Re;surrection (2019) (Lloyd Asplund)
- Birth of Kitarō: The Mystery of GeGeGe (2023) (Tokisada Ryuga)

=== Tokusatsu ===
- Kaizoku Sentai Gokaiger (Yokubarido (ep. 10))
- Zyuden Sentai Kyoryuger (Debo Doronboss (ep. 4))
- Doubutsu Sentai Zyuohger (Halbergoi (ep. 2))
- Uchu Sentai Kyuranger (Inda (other by Hiroki Shimowada, Akihiro Matsushima) (ep. 27))
- Kaitou Sentai Lupinranger VS Keisatsu Sentai Patranger (Envy Chiruda) (ep. 33)

=== Dubbing ===
==== Live-action ====
- Almost Famous (William Miller (Patrick Fugit))
- Rome (Gaius Octavian (Max Pirkis))

==== Animation ====
- Fillmore! (Cornelius Fillmore)
- Teen Titans (Puppet King)
