= Hige =

Hige may refer to:

- Hige, a Japanese word for:
  - Beard
  - Whiskers
  - Barbel
- Hige, a character from Japanese anime series Wolf's Rain.
- Hige, a Japanese rock band.
