= List of Wolf's Rain episodes =

Volume 1 of original Japanese DVD release of Wolf's Rain

This is a list of episodes for the anime Wolf's Rain. The series was created by Keiko Nobumoto and Bones and directed by Tensai Okamura. Originally broadcast across Japan on Fuji TV and the anime CS television network, Animax, between January 6, 2003, and July 29, 2003, it ran for a full season of 26 episodes, with four more OVA episodes being released on DVD in Japan, in January and February 2004, completing the story. Wolf's Rain was also seen in American TV broadcast on Cartoon Network's Adult Swim late-night programming block in 2004.

All of the music used in Wolf's Rain soundtrack was composed and arranged by Yoko Kanno, with vocals provided by various artists, including Maaya Sakamoto, Ilaria Graziano, Steve Conte, and Joyce. While most anime series use primarily Japanese language themes, both the opening and ending themes for this series are performed in English. Written by Tim Jensen and performed by Steve Conte, the song "Stray" is used as the opening theme for the first 25 episodes and the second OVA episode. The other three OVA episodes do not have any opening sequences at all. "Gravity", written by Troy and performed by Maaya Sakamoto, is used as the closing theme for the first 25 episodes and the first three OVA episodes. The 26th episode uses a different ending theme, the song "Tell Me What the Rain Knows", written by Chris Mosdell and performed by Sakamoto. For the final OVA episode, the original opening, "Stray" is used to close the series.

In another variation from most anime series, the title screens for each episode appear at the end of the episode rather than near the beginning. As the episode ends, but before the ending theme is played, the title is displayed in white kanji on a black screen. In the Bandai Region 1 release, the English title is added to the top center of the screen, also in white.

== Episodes ==
No.	Title	Directed by	Written by	Original release date	English air date
1	"City of Howls"; Transliteration: "Hōkō no Machikado" (Japanese: 咆哮の街角)	Yoshiyuki Takei	Keiko Nobumoto	January 6, 2003	April 24, 2004
In Freeze City, seat of Lord Orkham's domain, Tsume and the group of thieves he leads find a white wolf lying under a tree. When they reach for it, it wakes up and kills two of the thieves before Tsume draws it off. Once the wolf and Tsume are away from the humans, Tsume's true form is revealed for a moment: a gray wolf. He and the white wolf argue and end up fighting briefly. The smell of their blood causes Cheza to awaken in the laboratory where she is being studied. Later, the white wolf is shot by Quent Yaiden and stored in a cage at the police station. During his questioning by Detective Hubb Lebowski, Quent claims the "dog" he shot was a wolf, even though they are supposed to have been extinct for 200 years. Hubb has Cher look at it and she asks him to have it brought to her lab. After they leave, a brown wolf named Hige teases the white wolf about being caught and caged, but the white wolf says he just wanted a long rest. After they escape the police station, with the white wolf now using human form as well, Hige asks him where he is going. The white replies "Paradise", before introducing himself as Kiba.
2	"Toboe, Who Doesn't Howl"; Transliteration: "Nakanai Tōboe" (Japanese: 哭かない遠吠え)	Ikurō Satō	Keiko Nobumoto	January 13, 2003	May 1, 2004
A young red wolf meets Leara, a girl who feeds him some sausages. He catches up to her and assumes his human form to introduce himself to her as Toboe. After leaving her, he runs into Tsume, but both are found by Quent and his dog Blue. Tsume helps Toboe get away, but chases him off when Toboe wants to stay with him. Toboe later spots Leara's falcon and tries to catch it for her, but accidentally kills it. When he realizes what he did, he gets so upset he sits and howls, revealing his true form. Tsume runs by and scuffs Toboe away as Leara watches in shock. Meanwhile, Kiba and Hige get themselves arrested so they can get back into the building Kiba was taken to earlier, as it is also where Cheza is at. Cher tells Hubb that they are dealing with three dogs and both wonder if the "dogs" are actually wolves. That night, feeling like something is going to happen, Kiba and Hige break out of their cell and run towards the lab. When the power goes out, Cher runs to check on Cheza and is found there by Darcia who removes his mask to reveal a wolf's eye that knocks her unconscious. Kiba and Hige arrive at the lab in time to see Lord Darcia carrying Cheza out of the building.
3	"BAD FELLOW"	Yoshiyuki Takei	Keiko Nobumoto	January 20, 2003	May 8, 2004
Lord Darcia knows Kiba and Hige are wolves despite their illusions, and greets them before taking Cheza away in his airship. Quent shows Hubb the claw marks from his earlier run in with Tsume and Toboe, and tells him that the wolves are disguising themselves as humans now. He also mentions the Book of the Moon, which says that humans were created from wolves. Hubb later visits Cher at the hospital and asks her about the Book of the Moon, but she says its just a fairy tale. When Hubb tries to research the book in the police computers, he finds no information. One of his fellow officers tells him they had cornered the leader of the gang of thieves, when Quent's dog attacked him and they fell off a walkway. However, the officers only saw a large gray "dog" run off and couldn't find the boy anywhere. Toboe, alone again after arguing with Tsume, meets Hige and Kiba. While in the sewers, Kiba finds Tsume's blood trail and follows it back to his lair. Toboe asks Tsume to join them in searching for Paradise. The police arrive in search of Tsume, but the four easily evade the men. They go to the city wall and jump down, heading into the wilderness. When Hubb and Quent go to where they landed, they find a trail of paw prints.
4	"Scars in the Wasteland"; Transliteration: "Kōya no Kizuato" (Japanese: 荒野の傷跡)	Masaki Kitamura	Tensai Okamura	January 27, 2003	May 15, 2004
The wolves find themselves driven into a cave by a blizzard. While they discuss not having eaten for three days, Hige smells the carcass of a deer-like animal. Tsume gets annoyed when the others start talking about Paradise and stomps off, with Toboe following to try to persuade him to return. They end up in the ruins of a city. As Toboe searches for Tsume, he accidentally activates an automated sentry mech. Tsume sees it targeting Toboe and rushes to save him, getting shot in the leg in the process. They run off, but the mech catches up and shoots the ground out from under them, sending them plummeting into a valley below. Kiba and Hige realize the place was a military installation and go to look for the other two. When the mech finds them again, Toboe tries to act as a decoy to give Tsume time to limp away, but it spots Tsume and corners him. As it is about to fire, Kiba attacks the mech and draws off its fire. He spears it with a slab of rock, but it continues firing as Kiba runs up a nearly vertical valley of snow. The mech's gunfire triggers an avalanche that buries it. Back in the city, Cher gives Hubb a key and asks him to water her plants while she's gone, as she is taking a leave of absence and wonders what the work she's been doing was for. When she leaves, she kisses him on the mouth which dazes him long enough for her to get outside and into a black car with some men and leave. When Hubb goes to her house, though, he doesn't find any plants at all. He spots a scarf, which he gifted to her in an earlier episode, poking out of her desk drawer, and opens it to find that the scarf is wrapped around a copy of the Book of the Moon.
5	"Fallen Wolves"; Transliteration: "Ochita Ōkami" (Japanese: 堕ちた狼)	Ikurō Satō	Keiko Nobumoto; Aya Yoshinaga	February 3, 2003	May 22, 2004
The wolves reach an ocean and a long bridge that smells faintly of Lunar Flowers. At the end of the bridge, they reach a dying island city where they meet a pack of older wolves, led by a large, dark gray wolf named Zali and his mate Cole. The pack laughs when they hear the four wolves are going to Paradise, and claim to have been there but found no Paradise, only Hell. Tsume wants to leave but Kiba says something has to be there to have so many wolves there. In a graveyard, they find an old wolf digging his grave who tells them that lunar flowers used to bloom all over the island until they were dug up and taken away. He also shows them the entrance the wolves used to try to get to Paradise, a partially boarded up tunnel that reeks of death. Zali orders Kiba and the others to leave in the morning. That night, Kiba and Tsume argue over whether Paradise really exists, and they go off in separate directions, with Toboe following Tsume and Hige staying to eat some food Cole brought them. Hige wonders this dying run-down island is able to have any food, and Cole tells him he should come to the train station the following day, and he might see something interesting. Kiba runs into Moss and some other members of Zali's pack who badly beat him after he calls them dogs. The next day, Hige finds Tsume and Toboe at the train station. When they look down on the lower level, they watch in horror as the wolves of Zali's pack are harnessed like dogs and used by humans to haul cargo. The old wolf they met earlier dies in his harness. Kiba arrives and is enraged at the sight before him. He runs up to the gangway to stop it but Zali holds him back. Zali's pack bury the old wolf in the hole he'd dug.
6	"The Successors"; Transliteration: "Uketsugu Mono" (Japanese: 受け継ぐもの)	Akitoshi Yokoyama	Keiko Nobumoto	February 24, 2003	May 29, 2004
Toboe treats Kiba's wounds while Tsume sends Hige to look for food since he was the only one to eat. Zali remembers when he led a group of wolves through the tunnel to seek out Paradise, only to find the tunnel filled with toxic gases that killed most of them. Cole tries to convince him to try again since the machines on the island are dead and the gas gone, but Zali refuses to consider it. Tsume asks Kiba where he got the other wounds from, but instead of answering, Kiba tells him about seeing the Lunar Flowers when he was a cub. They were all burned in a fire that also killed all of Kiba's pack but himself, and he wonders why he was the sole survivor. Caught in a trap set by the humans for stray dogs, Hige is knocked out by Moss so they will see him as a dog. Toboe sees it and runs to tell Tsume and Kiba. The three seek out Zali, who demands to know why Moss did it. However, Moss and two other wolves turn on him. Zali refuses to let Kiba and the others help him, and after the three finish beating him, Zali helps them rescue Hige and make their way into the tunnel. He refuses to go with them, though, saying that he is certain there are some wolves who can get into Paradise and some who can't and he is one of the ones who can't. Back in the city, Hubb reads the Book of the Moon at Cher's apartment. Quent plans to leave the city, realizing that the wolves are gone. Hubb finds Quent at the bar before he goes and shows him the Book of the Moon, but Quent gives only half answers to his questions before leaving.
7	"The Flower Maiden"; Transliteration: "Hana no Shōjo" (Japanese: 花の少女)	Yoshiyuki Takei	Dai Satō	March 3, 2003	June 5, 2004
As Lord Darcia takes Cheza back to the mountain stronghold where she was born, he comes under attack from Lord Orkham's soldiers, accompanied by Cher, who have come to retrieve Cheza. While watching the battle from the woods below, Kiba senses Cheza's presence and vice versa. Cheza jumps from the airship just before Orkham's men bring it down. She floats down to a pond at the top of the mountain. The wolves quickly climb up to find her while the soldiers land the airship to look for her as well. Though she can't see, Cheza knows when the wolves arrive and embraces Kiba while saying "we meet at last." Cheza's reaction at meeting Kiba breaks Cher's instruments, but she is able to tell the soldiers that she is in the stronghold's garden area. The soldiers surround the garden, but Cheza leads Kiba off. Toboe follows them, while Tsume and Hige try to fight through the soldiers, so they turn back and join the others. After breaking through another line of soldiers, they run past where Cher is standing with the soldier's commander, Cheza smiling happily as they run. The soldiers follow, but Cheza opens a door in the roots of a plant and they quickly escape through it and the soldiers arrive to find a dead end.
8	"Song of Sleep"; Transliteration: "Nemuri no Uta" (Japanese: 眠りの歌)	Masaki Kitamura	Keiko Nobumoto	March 10, 2003	June 12, 2004
The wolves and Cheza make their way back down from the mountain. Tsume and Kiba start arguing again, so Cheza sings and puts them all to sleep. The next day, Toboe and Hige go into town for food, and are followed by a strange old woman. They also acquire some boots for Cheza. They rejoin the others, but the old woman appears and removes her sunglasses, showing that she has the same red eyes as Cheza. She explains that she is a Hanabito, an imperfect form of Flower Maiden. She escaped from Darcia's castle after the other Hanabito started withering and dying, though she could still feel their deaths. She warns Cheza not go with the wolves because it will lead to destruction, but Cheza says they are going to Paradise, even though the wolves hadn't mentioned it to her yet. Cher locates the tree using her radar, but the wolves surround her. Kiba drops his disguise for a moment showing her that she was correct in believing they are wolves. They escape into the city and Cheza confirms that the wolves want her to stay with them. They later return to the tree so Cheza can extend the Hanabito's life, but the Hanabito stops her and says she's satisfied with having finally met a true Flower Maiden. Cheza cries for the Hanabito when she dies. As the episode ends, Quent and Blue arrive at the aerial city.
9	"Misgivings"; Transliteration: "Giwaku" (Japanese: 疑惑)	Hiroyuki Kanbe	Dai Satō	March 17, 2003	June 19, 2004
Cher and Quent end up at the same bar drinking side by side. When Quent asks the barkeeper about the old castle at the top, Cher says there are wolves wandering around. Outside the bar, the wolves pass by and Cheza approaches Blue, calling her a friend and telling her that she has wolf in her too. The wolves leave Toboe and Cheza in a bus at a junkyard while they search for a way to escape the city. One of the soldiers injured by the wolves in the earlier fight attacks a small boy, thinking he too is a wolf in disguise. Blue hears him beating the kid and drives off the soldiers. Quent mistakenly believes Blue was the one who hurt the boy and shoots above her head, yelling at her to get away from the boy. While Quent is in the boy's home treating the boy's wounds, the soldier from before spots Blue tied up outside and begins beating her with his gun. When she gets back up, he freaks out and fires at her. Quent goes back outside to find the dead soldier's body, Blue's broken collar, and a blood stain where Blue had been tied up. Cher goes to the Darcia family cemetery and encounters Darcia, who puts her to sleep. The wolves decide to escape the city through the "Forest of Death", a place with a strange electro-magnetic field that renders computers and machines useless and that causes humans to get hopelessly lost. Quent spots Toboe in the city, but when he gives chase, Blue appears, badly wounded, and collapses in front of him. Quent leaves her to go after the wolves, despite her grabbing his coat to stop him. Quent finds the four wolves at the edge of the city. Kiba gets shot protecting Cheza, but then Quent runs out of bullets and they escape before he can reload. When he goes back to the spot where he left the wounded Blue, she is gone.
10	"MOON'S DOOM"	Ikurō Satō	Ichirō Ōkouchi	April 7, 2003	June 26, 2004
The wolves enter the "Forest of Death" and find it full of dead trees and no animal life except for giant bugs. Sunlight can't break through either. Cheza collapses from being without sun and water too long. Hige hears an owl and goes to hunt it, followed by Tsume. When they find it, it has no scent and it taunts them before flying off. Toboe howls for them to come back and they return to find Cheza is starting to wither. Kiba carries her as they hurry to try to find an exit. The owl returns them to taunt them with riddles before flying off. They follow and end up at a cave which the owl says has the answer. Inside the cave, they find the owl's dead skeleton before being attacked by hundreds of giant pill bugs. The wolves try to fight the bugs, but are vastly outnumbered. Cheza suddenly runs through the bugs and leads them to a group of venus fly traps. The bugs stop following to avoid the plants. Nearby they find the exit to the cave and the forest, emerging under a full moon by a pond. Back at the city, Quent is beaten and questioned repeatedly by the soldiers about his encounter with the wolves. The Commander asks about the bites on his men and Quent says they were from wolves. Cher wakes up in Darcia's keep, and he tells her that Lord Orkham stole Cheza from them without knowing what she was and shares more information about Cheza and the Book of the Moon with her. He also tells her Cheza will only live a short life and won't survive more than a few more full moons.
11	"Vanishing Point"; Transliteration: "Shōshitsuten" (Japanese: 消失点)	Yoshiyuki Takei	Dai Satō	April 14, 2003	July 3, 2004
Lady Jaguara's army launches a sneak attack on Freeze City, her black armored soldiers assassinating Lord Orkham along with his royal guard and all his court. Shortly before, Hubb learns that Cheza was stolen and that Cher went with the search team. He is then arrested under a warrant issued earlier by Orkham. Though he takes a beating, he is able to learn more about what has been going on and where Cher is by tricking his interrogator. He is then able to escape after the city comes under attack from Jaguara's troops and departs for Darcia's aerial city. Orkham's soldiers stationed there learn of their lord's assassination and go back to defend Freeze City Meanwhile, Lord Darcia tells Cher more about what Paradise is and about Hamona's illness, before using his eye to put her to sleep. He explains that Paradise is a place where wolves rule, and that he needs to reach Paradise in order to heal Hamona. He leaves her hooked up to a machine while he goes to retrieve Cheza. That night, Cheza and the wolves are excited by the full moon and dance around in a fountain before the wolves stop and howl. As they stand there, a vast field of Lunar Flowers appears, forming a road to Paradise. Cheza and the wolves run down the road, but Darcia arrives and the flowers vanish. Using a laser fired from his airship, he badly wounds the four wolves, until only Kiba is left. He refuses to stay down and keeps getting up to try to protect Cheza until she finally tells him that he's done enough and sings him to sleep. To protect the wolves from further harm, she leaves with Darcia.
12	"DON'T MAKE ME BLUE"	Masahiro Andō	Keiko Nobumoto	April 21, 2003	July 10, 2004
Lady Jaguara's troops attack Lord Darcia's keep while he is away. Cher is able to escape, but Darcia returns to find Hamona dead. Cheza starts singing and touches Hamona, but Darcia yells at her to stop it and throws her aside. He cries and screams in agony and beats his head against the wall. Back in the city, the wolves run into Blue and save her from some men wanting to force her to work as a prostitute. Hige wants to let her stay with them, but Tsume and Toboe object because she hunted them with Quent. When Blue leaves, Hige follows. She tells him that Quent believes his family was killed by wolves during a fire that hit their town, though she herself isn't sure it was the wolves. Now that she knows she's half-wolf, she feels she can't be with Quent because she couldn't hunt her own kind. While they talk, Toboe finds them, but the three quickly rush back to find Kiba and Tsume when they hear gunfire coming from that direction. They are being hunted by the men they saved Blue from earlier, who want to sell them to Jaguara. While they run, they come across an old couple who help them escape from the men and feed them. Meanwhile, Hubb reaches the aerial city and begins looking for Cher. He ends up at the bar where she was drinking and finds Quent there. Quent tells Hubb he suspected Blue was part wolf and that's why she could find them. Hubb ends up drinking with him at the bar and after a while, Quent suggests they search the next town, since Hubb would have found her already if she was still there.
13	"Men's Lament"; Transliteration: "Otokotachi no Aika" (Japanese: 男たちの哀歌)	Koji Sawai	Aya Yoshinaga	April 28, 2003	July 17, 2004
Hubb and Quent buy a beat up car to take them to the next city. They take turns with one driving while the others drink. Though hesitant at first, Blue joins the wolves as they head to Darcia's keep to rescue Cheza. That night as snow falls, Quent thinks he sees Blue in front of the car's headlights. He stops and calls out but she doesn't answer. As they continue on, Hubb remembers his and Cher's wedding day, scenes of their life before they were divorced and how Cher's research work with Cheza destroyed their marriage. When they finally reach the city, they split up. Hubb searches for Cher in the town, but no one has seen her. Quent meets the old couple and helps them get their RV unstuck from the sand. While sharing a drink with them, they tell him about the wolves they met. When the old man mentions a black wolf, Quent realizes he is talking about Blue. As the sun sets, Hubb is happily reunited with Cher at a fountain. She tells him she is going to Darcia's keep to get to Cheza and tries to get Hubb to go back without her. He refuses to be left behind again, so Cher relents and goes with him to the car where Quent is waiting.
14	"The Fallen Keep"; Transliteration: "Botsuraku no Shiro" (Japanese: 没落の城)	Ikurō Satō	Dai Satō	May 5, 2003	July 24, 2004
While traveling through a blizzard, Blue and Toboe struggle to keep up. Hige and Tsume are able to convince Kiba to stop to rest and wait out the storm in a nearby shelter. The others want to rest till morning, but Kiba refuses to stop any longer and goes ahead on his own. While they drive through the blizzard, Cher tells Hubb how Cheza was created, what her purpose is, and how Lord Orkham acquired her. At Lord Darcia's keep, Cheza is still lying on the floor where Darcia threw her and Darcia is still mourning Hamona's death. Cheza awakens when Kiba enters the keep. The rest arrive not too far behind him to find that Cher and the others are also there. Kiba reaches the room where Cheza is, while Hige leads the others after Cheza's scent and Hubb's allergies help the humans figure out which direction to go. When Cheza tries to go to Kiba, Darcia throws her aside. Kiba and Darcia fight briefly as Darcia asks what Kiba expects to find in Paradise. Kiba tells him he simply wants to find a future. Quent arrives and tries to shoot Kiba, but Blue jumps in front of his gun. Suddenly, dozens of Lady Jaguara's airships arrive and bombard the keep with laser fire. Cher and Hubb are able to get Cheza out, but they are captured outside by the black armored troops along with Blue, who tried to help them. The other wolves get out, but Kiba runs back for Cheza, chasing after the airships. Darcia stands on the edge of his keep with Hamona in his arms, smiling at her as the keep is destroyed in a final burst of light, leaving nothing but a mound behind. The other wolves find no sign of Kiba.
15	"Grey Wolf"; Transliteration: "Haiiroōkami" (Japanese: 灰色狼)	Yoshiyuki Takei	N/A	May 12, 2003	N/A
A recap episode told from Tsume's perspective using footage and dialog primarily from the first three episodes. In a few scenes towards the beginning, voice overs from Tsume are added giving his thoughts about Freeze City and his life before he met Kiba. Towards the end, it uses flashes of scenes from other episodes with Kiba's story from episode 6 when he told Tsume of seeing the Lunar Flowers and his pack's death.
16	"Dream Journey"; Transliteration: "Yume no Tabiji" (Japanese: 夢の旅路)	Yoshiyuki Takei	N/A	May 19, 2003	N/A
A recap episode told from Toboe's perspective, mostly using footage and dialog from the episodes two, three, five, and six. In a few scenes, a voice over is added with Toboe talking about being alone in the city, his thoughts about his first meeting with Leara and his thoughts on the start of their journey. It ends with the meeting with Cheza in episode seven.
17	"Scent of a Flower, Blood of a Wolf"; Transliteration: "Hana no Kaori, Ōkami no Chi" (Japanese: 花の香り, 狼の血)	Yoshiyuki Takei	N/A	May 26, 2003	N/A
A recap episode told from Hige's perspective again using footage from the first three episodes and episodes seven through eleven. Some scenes add a voice over from Hige sharing his thoughts on his life in Freeze City, meeting Kiba, and their time with Cheza. It ends with the meeting with Blue in episode twelve.
18	"Men, Wolves, and the Book of the Moon"; Transliteration: "Hito Ōkami Tsuki no Sho" (Japanese: 人·狼·月の書)	Tensai Okamura	N/A	June 2, 2003	N/A
A recap episode told mostly from Hubb's perspective, though the opening before the opening sequence is told from Quent's. The episode opening has new footage showing that Quent was the one who had shot Kiba before Kiba had entered Freeze City. The rest uses footage from the first four episodes and episodes eleven through fourteen. It adds some voice overs by Hubb giving his thoughts on his life being changed by his getting involved with the Book of the Moon, wolves, and his search for Cher. It ends with the opening scene from episode one with Kiba lying in the snow saying there is nothing at the end of the road, no Paradise, yet he is still driven to find it by a voice that calls him.
19	"A Dream of an Oasis"; Transliteration: "Oasis no Yume" (Japanese: オアシスの夢)	Hiroyuki Kanbe	Keiko Nobumoto	June 9, 2003	July 31, 2004
Hige, Tsume, and Toboe consider giving up the search for Kiba and for Paradise when Toboe finds Quent lying half-frozen in the snow. As Hige and Tsume leave to search for Kiba, Toboe stays and lays down beside Quent to warm him up. In his sleep, Quent thinks he is holding Blue. After leaving Quent, Toboe is attacked by Iyek, a member of the Hmong tribe. Hige and Tsume hear him howl and rush back to help. When Iyek realizes they are wolves, he apologizes and leads them to his village. The Hmong tribe consider wolves their friends and are on edge because Jaguara's troops have been attacking their tribe's dogs. In the morning they decide to search for Kiba at the Desert's Bones, a vast desert, where people are rumored to find eternal happiness and never return, as there is an oasis in its center rumored to lead to the Garden of Eternity. As they prepare to leave, Toboe decides he wants to stay in the village with Iyek and his people. Meanwhile, Kiba finds himself in a lush area full of vibrant green grass, plenty of water, and a variety of wildlife. There he meets Mew, a female caracal, who tells him they are in a place where everyone can be free and they don't have to worry about being different species. Kiba believes he has found Paradise as he feels so at peace and everyone is living together. They play in the grass and she asks him to stay with her forever.
20	"CONSCIOUSLY"	Yoshiyuki Takei	Keiko Nobumoto	June 16, 2003	August 7, 2004
Toboe explains that living with Iyek and his people seems like Paradise to him. Tsume and Hige reluctantly accept his choice and go on to look for Kiba. Kiba tells Mew he is hearing people calling him, but can't remember who they are, but she tells him it will be okay, he'll get used to forgetting. Hige and Tsume find the plant in the desert Iyek told them about just as Jaguara's troops arrive and find Kiba there. Hige and Tsume attack them, joined by Iyek and Toboe. Not realizing the dangerous nature of the plant, the troops stand around it while fighting and it paralyzes them. The wolves and Iyek take Kiba's body to the village elder, who performs a ceremony to call Kiba's spirit back to his body. When the ceremony starts, a fierce wind blows over Kiba and Mew. Mew explains that someone is calling him back and that he should go because this is not the real Paradise. Kiba hears Cheza calling him and asking him to remember. When he calls out her name, the false Paradise fades and he returns. In the back of a transport truck with Blue, Cheza cries. After sleeping naturally and regaining his strength, Kiba goes to talk to his pack. When they prepare to leave again, Toboe decides he won't whine or run away anymore. As they are leaving, Toboe asks Iyek to go find and help Quent.
21	"Battle's Red Glare"; Transliteration: "Tatakai no Noroshi" (Japanese: 戦いの狼煙)	Kunihiro Mori	Dai Satō	June 23, 2003	August 14, 2004
The wolves reach a decayed, domed city where the remnants of Lord Orkham's army are battling Lady Jaguara's troops. They join in to attack the invading soldiers, and end up saving the Commander from certain death, showing their true form in the process. Recognizing him from before, the wolves ask if he knows where Cheza is. He confirms the black armored troops are Jaguara's and tells that Cheza would probably have been taken to Jaguara's keep. He tells them how to get there, then he and his men chase down the troops that escaped. In a land convoy, Cheza and Blue are caged side-by-side in one truck, while Cher and Hubb are tied up in another truck. A bump knocks the pair to the floor and Hubb is able to use his teeth to bite through Cher's restraints just as the transport is attacked by the Commander and his men. Cher and Hubb find Cheza and Blue in the convoy. As the four try to escape, one of Jaguara's soldiers grabs Cheza. Blue and Cher fight him off while Hubb grabs Cheza and tries to carry her to safety. A beam of light transports them both to Jaguara's airship and they are recaptured, while Cher and Blue are left to face a dozen of Jaguara's troops. They are saved by the Commander and his men, who tells Cher about meeting the wolves. He also lets them have a vehicle so they can drive to Jaguara's keep, before he and his men decide to return to Freeze City to try to free their home from Jaguara.
22	"Pieces of a Shooting Star"; Transliteration: "Ryūsei no Hahen" (Japanese: 流星の破片)	Masahiro Andō	Touko Machida	June 30, 2003	August 21, 2004
As the wolves make their way across the sea of drift ice, they find a huge graveyard. Toboe is struggling to keep up. The older ones have to stop and wait for him. When he falls on some ice for a moment, a massive walrus breaks up through the ice and attacks him, knocking him into the water. It spears Kiba in the leg with its tusk. Hige and Tsume tried to drive it off. Toboe freezes at first, then something inside him snaps and he rushes in, biting the walrus in the eye and refusing to let go. It tries to shake him off by swimming through broken ice and dragging him underwater before exploding back up out of the water and crashing through a huge ice shelf. Badly wounded, the walrus climbs onto the ice and laments his actions. The walrus explains that he was the guardian of the island for years and stubbornly refused to leave it, even when the rest of his kind left to find a better place to live. Dying, he tells the wolves that he is not a victim; but the one who will save them. Kiba, Hige, and Tsume let Toboe eat first, before all four pick the walrus' body clean and continue on. Meanwhile, Quent makes his way to Lady Jaguara's city as part of a convoy of refugees fleeing the war and the alarming deterioration of the environment. Already at Jaguara's keep, Hubb is thrown into a cell beside an old woman. The woman tells him that Jaguara hates her kind and likes to kill them in her Great Hall. Later, Cheza is in another water bubble and Jaguara makes her scream by eating wolf's meat and drinking wolf's blood.
23	"Heartbeat of the Black City"; Transliteration: "Kuroi Machi no Kodō" (Japanese: 黒い街の鼓動)	Ikurō Satō	Dai Satō	July 7, 2003	August 28, 2004
The four wolves arrive at Jaguara's capital amid thousands of refugees seeking entry. Unlike the wrecks all other cities have become, Jaguara's gigantic domed city is fully intact and functional, possibly the last hope for Mankind to find shelter from the collapsing biosphere outside. The wolves split up with Kiba and Tsume going to find information and a way into Jaguara's castle, while Hige and Toboe go look for food. Hige starts feeling sick from the sterile atmosphere and the constant surveillance within the city, ditching Toboe in this unstable state. The collar that Hige wore on his neck from the very start turns out to be a tracker, which leads Jaguara to know of their presence, hoping they'll lead her to Paradise.
24	"Scent of a Trap"; Transliteration: "Wana no Nioi" (Japanese: 罠の匂い)	Tomoki Kyoda; Masahiro Andō	Miya Asakawa	July 14, 2003	September 4, 2004
Blue and Cher also come to Jaguara's city. They want to enter her castle, but the people in the city seem to consciously ignore it. Blue and Cher are caught by Jaguara's soldiers, who tell them that they destroyed Blue's village, Kyrios. After a fight, the two escape but get separated. Then, Blue finds Hige to learn that he wants to escape the city, still in his unstable state, claiming that everything is his fault. The two see Toboe being captured and run away before they can be captured too. Meanwhile, Tsume and Kiba are separated while in Jaguara's keep. Tsume, following the Flower's scent, enters a room where he sees the bodies of wolves in tubes, all wearing the same type of collar as Hige, implying that Hige was originally one of Jaguara's pets. Horrified, he is distracted and is captured. On the other hand, Kiba opens the doors to a room filled with Jaguara's soldiers. He struggles but defeats them all, stumbling and bloodied, he tries to go find Cheza.
25	"False Memories"; Transliteration: "Ayamachi no Kioku" (Japanese: 過ちの記憶)	Yoshiyuki Takei	Aya Yoshinaga	July 21, 2003	September 11, 2004
Hige becomes aware of the tracker in his collar and tells Blue to take it off. Then, they're again attacked by soldiers, but manage to flee. Kiba goes all the way to where Cheza is and is relieved to find her. However, Lady Jaguara traps him, ties him to a table and moves Cheza. Jaguara wants to conclude her plan by using Kiba's blood for a moonlight reactor to force open the gates of Heaven for humanity instead of the wolves. She summons all the Nobles of the Earth to her great hall to celebrate Mankind's victory. Cher meets a mysterious disguised character, who leads her into the castle. Cheza sings her song because Kiba asks her to, and Tsume and Toboe, who are both in jail, hear her and double their efforts to break out. Hige wants to go and save Cheza, but promises Blue to stay so then he'll definitely try to return. Cher and the disguised man enter the great hall of celebrating Nobles, the man's power causing the assembled nobility to drop the floor until it is only Jaguara, the man, and Cher left standing.
26	"Moonlight Crucible"; Transliteration: "Gekkōro" (Japanese: 月光炉)	Tensai Okamura	Dai Satō	July 28, 2003	September 18, 2004
Lady Jaguara hopes that her plan to enter Paradise will succeed now. The disguised Lord Darcia reveals himself. Lady Jaguara tells him she killed her younger sister Hamona, whom he loved. Lights in the city are switched off. Thus, the electronic gates in the prison fail too, and Tsume, Toboe and Hubb can break out. Hige comes and meets them, and they leave together. Blue meets the beaten up Quent and tells him that soldiers, not the wolves, destroyed Kyrios, his home. Kiba manages to break free from his bounds and sees a vision of the false Noble's Paradise that Jaguara attempts to create. Jaguara thinks she has entered the Paradise with Darcia, but Darcia turns into a wolf and attacks her. Her castle breaks apart, and Jaguara, furious, stabs Darcia with a poisoned dagger. Cheza's prison is also broken, and Cher cares for her. Jaguara and Darcia fight, but when Jaguara is about to kill Darcia, Hige attacks her. But when Hige goes to attack her once more, Jaguara impales him in the right shoulder by her sword. Kiba arrives in the scene along with Tsume and Toboe, who remove the sword from Hige. Kiba attacks Jaguara, but Jaguara attempts to use her magic to trap him once more, but Kiba manages to walk through it. While she's distracted, Hige attacks her, but is unsuccessful due to his wound. Then Kiba gives Jaguara a fatal bite to the neck. Wounded, Jaguara turns to see Darcia standing, only for Darcia to impale her through the stomach with her own sword, killing her. Then Darcia states that he has always known that Kiba was the chosen wolf. Kiba asks Darcia what he is, because he is neither a wolf nor a Noble. Darcia then shows him a shiny black circular stone, and states that he was also chosen, and that it is not merely that his people seek Paradise. He then leaves the castle before saying that, "But that paradise is calling for us." During the end credits of the episode, Cher and Hubb are reunited and the wolves escape the castle with Cheza and the humans.
27	"Where the Soul Goes"; Transliteration: "Tamashii no Yukue" (Japanese: 魂の行方)	Masahiro Andō	Keiko Nobumoto	OVA	September 25, 2004
Cheza heals the wounded Hige. Blue is almost overrun by a car, but Quent shoves her away and is hit instead of her. Cher and Hubb go on with an abandoned car. Then the wolves arrive at the place where Quent was hurt. Cher and Hubb pick up Blue and Quent. Then they meet the wolves and Cheza, shortly after Hige breaks down. They continue their journey together in the car, but the ground, damaged by meteor strikes, gives way and Cher is killed. Hubb puts Cher to rest, then swears to accompany the wolves to Paradise.
28	"Gunshot of Remorse"; Transliteration: "Kaikon no Jūsei" (Japanese: 悔恨の銃声)	Ikurō Satō	Keiko Nobumoto	OVA	October 2, 2004
Cheza and Hubb successfully perform CPR on the wounded Quent, who has gone into shock from internal bleeding. Hige mentions that only Quent's intense hatred of wolves has kept him motivated to live up to this moment. After Quent's condition stabilizes, Blue entrusts her master to Toboe in case something happens to her. The car breaks down, and the companions continue the journey on foot. When Quent awakens, unable to put aside his hatred of the wolves he tells Blue "You're not my dog anymore" and staggers away. Blue, shattered, embraces Hige and says "If I can be with you when the world ends, it'll be enough for me", and the two of them leave the pack. It is revealed from Quent's flashbacks that Darcia was one of the wolves hiding in Kyrios when it was destroyed by Lady Jaguara's forces, and Darcia himself appears before Quent and Toboe (after destroying what remains of Jaguara's keep with the weapons of his airship). After Darcia declares them unfit to enter Paradise, Darcia and Quent open fire on each other, but Toboe leaps into the line of fire. Quent kneels over Toboe's dying body, filled with horror at what he has done, and the episode ends with Darcia pulling the trigger on Quent.
29	"HIGH TIDE, HIGH TIME"	Yoshiyuki Takei	Keiko Nobumoto	OVA	October 9, 2004
It is revealed that Toboe attacks Darcia the moment he pulls the trigger on Quent, causing the bullet to miss. Bitten by Toboe, Darcia declares that he can no longer feel any pain because of Jaguara's poison, and flings the wounded wolf away. Quent pulls out a pistol and shoots Darcia, but Darcia mortally wounds Quent with his next shot. The gravely-wounded Toboe staggers over to Quent, and Quent pets Toboe as he realizes that the wolf kept him warm when he was freezing. Hubb, separated from the pack, encounters Darcia who slowly begins to strangle him, but Kiba interferes and asks why Darcia doesn't just use the stone that he possesses to open Paradise. Darcia laughs and declares "Paradise is right under your noses" before disappearing. Hige and Blue rejoin the pack, only to discover Quent and Toboe have died. As the pack continues on towards the Tree of All Seeds, Tsume remains behind to talk to Toboe, and reveals that his scar is a reminder of his cowardice, resulting in his banishment from his previous pack, and that it was Toboe who motivated him to pursue Paradise. The pack reaches the Tree of All Seeds, and Hubb, reading from the Book of the Moon, reveals this is the site of the Tower of the Seal the Nobles built to seal off Paradise. When asked by Blue how Paradise is described in the Book, Hubb reveals the last few pages are blank. Kiba explains Darcia is trying to become a wolf so he can open the true Paradise himself, and not a pale imitation like the one Jaguara attempted to open. The pack continues onward to the summit of the First Mountain, which is the gate to Paradise, but Hubb falls to his death in the attempt to scale it. It is then that Darcia (in wolf form) reappears as "the wretched beast" as mentioned in the prophecies of the Book of the Moon.
30	"WOLF'S RAIN"	Tensai Okamura	Keiko Nobumoto	OVA	October 16, 2004
As the final battle begins, Darcia quickly gains the upper hand over Kiba, and tries to secure Cheza, but Blue intercepts him at the cost of her own life. Having mortally wounded Blue, Darcia snatches up Cheza in his jaws and attempts to reach the summit of the First Mountain, with Kiba in hot pursuit. Hige, his throat torn open while trying to defend Cheza, comforts the dying Blue before Tsume reaches them. Hige asks Tsume to perform a coup de grâce with his own fangs, and dies by Blue's side, telling Tsume they will meet in Paradise. Kiba, Tsume, and Darcia battle near the summit, while the wounded Cheza wanders towards the crater at its center. Tsume's left side is badly ripped during his fight with Darcia, but he angrily rejects Kiba's help, demanding that Kiba go after Darcia and stop him. As Kiba descends into the crater, Tsume echoes Hige's words that they will meet in Paradise, collapses, and dies. Darcia and Kiba battle again as Cheza begins to take root, her limbs lengthening and becoming more and more plant-like. Darcia defeats Kiba and uproots Cheza, but swallows some of her venomous blood in the process. Now poisoned, Darcia staggers towards the pool that is the entrance to Paradise, but is incinerated as he touches the water, leaving only his wolf eye intact. Kiba and Cheza tenderly reunite, but Cheza explains that the world must freeze over and go into hibernation for a time. However, when Paradise opens, the two of them will meet again, if Kiba comes to find her. Cheza disintegrates into seeds and withers away into a dried-up Lunar Flower as snow begins to fall. The opening scene from episode one is repeated, with Kiba lying in the snow saying there is nothing at the end of the road, no Paradise, yet he is still driven to look for it by a voice that calls him. As he lies there, dying, the falling snow turns into a torrent of rain, which washes over the last blank pages of the Book of the Moon, revealing a portrait of Lunar Flowers. The rain sends Cheza's seeds into germination, and washes away the old world in a palingenesis that reveals a blooming Paradise (which Darcia's wolf eye begins to stain almost immediately). Kiba falls into the pool in the grassy field of Paradise and drowns, the red moon turning back to its normal pearl-white color being the last thing he sees. The next scene implies a change of setting to the present day, where Kiba, Tsume, Hige, and Toboe are seen in human form among a teeming city. Kiba, still searching for Cheza, is walking in the rain, then breaks into a run (which parallels the series opening animation) towards a lone Lunar Flower as the series ends.

== DVD releases ==
=== Region 1 ===
In Region 1, the series was released to DVD by Bandai Entertainment. The series was originally released as seven individual volumes, with the first volume having a regular and a limited edition option. The limited edition came with the Wolf's Rain Original Soundtrack CD, a Kiba wolf plushie, and an art box. A few months after the final volume was released, Bandai released a seven disk limited edition box set that contained the entire series. In 2006, the series as re-releases as a two volume collection under as part of Bandai's economy Anime Legends label.

Each volume included Japanese and English language audio tracks and English subtitles. The volume covers use the original artwork from the Japanese DVD releases. For the first five volumes, the artwork from the corresponding original release was used, resulting in the art work relating more to episodes from the previous volume than the ones for the previous one. The 6th volume uses the cover from the 7th volume of the Japanese release, while the 7th volume uses the cover from the 10th volume of the Japanese releases.

After Bandai Entertainment went out of business, Funimation secured the rights to Wolf's Rain, and released the anime under their rights on February 7, 2017, on DVD and for the first time on Blu-ray. The anime has yet to see a release in the latter format in Japan.

Title	Release Date	Eps	Extras
Wolf's Rain, Volume 1: Leader of the Pack	July 6, 2004	5	cast interview with four of the wolf actors, textless opening and ending, 3promotional films
Wolf's Rain, Volume 1: Leader of the Pack (Limited Edition)	July 6, 2004	5	cast interview with four of the wolf actors, textless opening and ending, 3promotional films, Kiba wolf plushie, Wolf's Rain Soundtrack, art box
Wolf's Rain, Volume 2: Blood and Flowers	August 24, 2004	5	cast interview, staff interview, 3 alternative textless endings
Wolf's Rain, Volume 3: Loss	October 12, 2004	4	textless ending collection
Wolf's Rain, Volume 4: Recollections	December 14, 2004	4	textless ending collection
Wolf's Rain, Volume 5: War for the Soul	January 4, 2005	4	textless ending collection
Wolf's Rain, Volume 6: Paradise and Poison	March 22, 2005	4	textless ending collection
Wolf's Rain, Volume 7: Final Encounters	May 24, 2005	4	none
Wolf's Rain Complete Collection Limited Edition Box Set	November 22, 2005	30	art box with stand
Wolf's Rain Anime Legends Complete Collection I	July 25, 2006	18	textless opening and ending, cast interviews
Wolf's Rain Anime Legends Complete Collection II	September 26, 2006	12	textless opening and ending, cast interviews
Wolf's Rain Anime Legends Perfect Collection	May 5, 2009	30	Textless openings, textless endings, Cast interviews
Wolf's Rain: The Complete Series (Combo-Pack with Blu-ray)	February 7, 2017	30	Cast interviews, staff interview, pilot film, promo films, fifteen-second promos, textless openings, textless endings, trailers

=== Region 2 (Japan) ===
Wolf's Rain was released in Japan by Bandai Visual across 8 volumes, with each volume having 3-4 episodes on a single disc with a Japanese language track and no subtitles. The first volume was released on June 23, 2003. The first pressing of the first volume included an A-2 sized cloth poster. The final four OVA episodes of the series were released in two additional volumes, each containing two episodes.

Volume	Date	Eps	Extras
1	May 23, 2003	3	trailers, textless intro, promo footage, television ads
2	June 27, 2003	3	unbroadcast episode trailers, ADR documentary
3	July 25, 2003	3	episode trailers, ADR documentary
4	August 22, 2003	3	episode trailers, ADR documentary
5	September 26, 2003	4	episode trailers
6	October 24, 2003	4	episode trailers
7	November 28, 2003	3	episode trailers, a karaoke track that includes English subtitles
8	December 21, 2003	3	episode trailers
9	January 23, 2004	2	none — first OVA
10	February 25, 2004	2	none — second OVA

=== Region 2 (Europe) ===
In Europe (Region 2), the series was released as in seven volumes by Beez Entertainment. Each volume included Japanese, English, and French language audio tracks and English, French, Dutch, and Polish subtitle options. While the volume DVD covers have the same art work as their Region 1 equivalents, the Region 2 volumes have different volume names, different episode counts, and different extras. Most of the volumes include character bios and textless opening and ending sequences.

Title	Release date	Eps	Length
Wolf's Rain, Volume 1: In the Company of Wolves	November 21, 2005	4	100 minutes
Wolf's Rain, Volume 2: Pact of the Wolves	December 12, 2005	4	100 minutes
Wolf's Rain, Volume 3: Between Dogs And Wolves	January 6, 2006	4	100 minutes
Wolf's Rain, Volume 4: The Midnight of the Wolves	February 13, 2006	4	100 minutes
Wolf's Rain, Volume 5: The Kingdom Of The Wolves	March 6, 2006	5	125 minutes
Wolf's Rain, Volume 6: Amongst Wolves	April 10, 2006	5	125 minutes
Wolf's Rain, Volume 7: The Miracle Of The Wolves	May 1, 2006	4	100 minutes

=== Region 4 ===
In Region 4, Madman Entertainment released Wolf's Rain in six individual volumes, followed by a single complete collection containing the entire series. Each volume included Japanese and English language audio tracks and English subtitles.

Title	Release Date	Eps	Extras
Wolf's Rain, Volume 1: Leader of the Pack	September 22, 2004	5	textless opening and ending
Wolf's Rain, Volume 2: Blood and Flowers	November 19, 2004	5	voice cast interview, textless opening and ending
Wolf's Rain, Volume 3: Loss	January 12, 2005	4	creator interview, textless ending collection
Wolf's Rain, Volume 4: Recollections	March 16, 2005	6	textless ending collection
Wolf's Rain, Volume 5: War for the Soul	June 15, 2005	5	textless ending collection
Wolf's Rain, Volume 6: Final Encounters	August 31, 2005	5	textless ending collection
Wolf's Rain Complete Collection	September 6, 2006	30	textless opening and ending collections, voice cast interviews, creator interview

== See also ==
- List of Wolf's Rain characters
