= Jessica Straus =

American voice actress

- Occupation: Voice actress
- Years active: 1997–present
- Website: jessicastraus.com

Jessica Straus is an American voice actress who works in animation, video games, and anime. She has provided voices for several video games, most notably as Juri in Super Street Fighter IV, Pi in .hack//GU//Rebirth, and Hiroko Hagakure from Danganronpa Another Episode: Ultra Despair Girls. In anime, she is known as the voice of Taruto from Magical Meow Meow Taruto, Blue from Wolf's Rain, Junko Miyaji from FLCL, Deunan Knute from the Appleseed movie, Mokaku from the Battle Vixens series, and Gidget from Eureka Seven.

== Filmography ==
=== Anime ===
List of voice performances in anime
Year	Title	Role	Notes	Source
2012	Persona 4: The Animation	Saki Konishi		
2021	King's Raid: Successors of the Will	Lorraine		

=== Film ===
List of voice performances in direct-to-video and television films
Year	Title	Role	Notes	Source
2012	Little Big Panda	Chi Chi		
2012	The Snow Queen	Gerda		

=== Video games ===
List of voice performances in video games
Year	Title	Role	Notes	Source
1999	Command & Conquer: Tiberian Sun	EVA Voice		
2001	Diablo II	Amazon		
2006	.hack//G.U. series	Pi	Rebirth, Reminisce, Redemption	-
2008	Persona 4	Hanako Ohtani, Saki Konishi	Uncredited (Note: The title does not list any English voice actors in its closing credits.)	Website
2009	Star Ocean: The Last Hope	Myuria Tionysus	Uncredited	Resume
2009	Klonoa	Chieftess, Pamela, Lephise		
2009	Infamous	Sasha		
2010	Final Fantasy Crystal Chronicles: The Crystal Bearers	Additional voices		
2010	Transformers: War for Cybertron	Slipstream		
2010	Super Street Fighter IV	Juri		
2011	Rune Factory: Tides of Destiny	Sonja, Child (Girl)		
2012	Street Fighter x Tekken	Juri		
2012	Tales of Graces f	Fodra Queen	Uncredited	Resume
2012	Darksiders II	Lilith		
2013	Disney Princess Palace Pets	Seashell		
2013	Tales of Xillia	Muzet	Uncredited	Tweet
2013	Killer Is Dead	Dolly		
2014	Infinite Crisis	Star Sapphire		Website
2014	Danganronpa Another Episode: Ultra Despair Girls	Hiroko Hagakure		Facebook
2015	Fallout 4	Polly, Supervisor White		
2015	The Legend of Heroes: Trails of Cold Steel	Chairwoman Irina Reinford		
2016	Street Fighter V	Juri		
2016	Dishonored 2	Doctor Alexandria Hypatia		
2017	Heroes of the Storm	Cassia	Reprisal of Diablo II role	Self
2017	.hack//G.U. Last Recode	Pi		
2023	Street Fighter 6	Juri		
2023	The Legend of Heroes: Trails into Reverie	Soldiers and Citizens of Zemuria		
2025	Teppen	Juri		
