= Hiroki Shimowada =

Japanese voice actor, stage actor and musician

- 下和田 ヒロキ
- Born: Hiroki Shimowada(下和田 裕貴); April 8, 1976 (age 50); Mie Prefecture, Japan
- Occupations: Voice actor; musician
- Years active: 1990–present
- Height: 158 cm (5 ft 2 in)

Hiroki Shimowada (下和田 ヒロキ, Shimowada Hiroki; born April 8, 1976) is a Japanese voice actor and musician from Mie Prefecture. Currently affiliated with Kekke Corporation.

== Filmography ==
Bold denotes major roles

=== Anime ===
2000

- Boogiepop Phantom as Middle Schooler (ep 2)

2001

- Cosmic Baton Girl Comet-san as Shun Imagawa/Imashun

2002

- SaiKano as Nori
- Shrine of the Morning Mist as Handsome Boy B (ep 16)
- Knight Hunters Eternity (as (ep 1)

2003

- Wolf's Rain as **Toboe**
- Popotan as Younger brother (ep 10)
- Zoids: Fuzors as Ryukku

2004

- The Gokusen as Ichikawa (ep 7)

2005

- Gunparade Orchestra as **Masatoshi Fukazawa**

2006

- Wan Wan Serebu Soreyuke! Tetsunoshin as **Hakase**
- Gintama as God of Poverty (ep 89)
- Pururun! Shizuku-chan as Machamaro
- Kekkaishi as Majirou

2007

- Lovely Complex as **Kazuki Kohori**

2008

- S.A as Prince-like guy (ep 17)
- The Telepathy Girl Ran as **Rui Ayase**

2009

- Sengoku Basara as **Ranmaru Mori**

2010

- Beyblade: Metal Masters as Aleksei
- The Tatami Galaxy as Hippocampus (ep 6)

2011

- Bakuman 2 as Shoyo Takahama

2012

- Hiiro no Kakera as **Shinji Inukai**

2014

- Captain Earth as Puck

2016

- JoJo's Bizarre Adventure: Diamond Is Unbreakable as Toshikazu Hazamada
- Re:Zero − Starting Life in Another World as Tivey Pearlbaton

=== OVA ===
- Azusa, Otetsudai Shimasu! (2004) as Tanabe
- Wolf's Rain (2004) as **Toboe**

=== Video games ===
- Baccano! (Apamu)
- Danzai no Maria (**Hiyori Kujōin**)
- Dark Chronicle (Tobo)
- Dear My Sun!! ~Musuko Ikusei Kapuricchō~ (**Fūto Shidō** (Amae))
- Galaxy Angel II (Bell Orchietette, Garam Azeat)
- Hiiro no Kakera series (**Shinji Inukai**)
- Laughter Land (**Guillered**)
- Sengoku Basara series (Ranmaru Mori)
- Zoids Struggle (**Kane**)
- Zone of the Enders (**Leo Stenbuck**)

=== Tokusatsu ===
2012

- Tokumei Sentai Go-Busters as Puppetloid (ep 34)

2017

- Uchu Sentai Kyuranger as Inda (other by Tetsu Shiratori, Akihiro Matsushima) (ep 27)

=== Dubbing roles ===
==== Live action ====
- #FollowFriday (Eric Cordon (Joseph Poliquin))
- Race to Witch Mountain (Seth (Alexander Ludwig))
- Unfinished Business (Mike Pancake (Dave Franco))
