= Arisa Ogasawara =

Japanese actress

- 小笠原 亜里沙
- Born: September 30, 1980 (age 45); Tokyo, Japan
- Occupation: Voice actress
- Years active: 1998–present
- Notable credits: Wolf's Rain as Cheza; Panty & Stocking with Garterbelt as Panty

Arisa Ogasawara (小笠原 亜里沙, Ogasawara Arisa; born September 30, 1980) is a Japanese actress, voice actress, and narrator from Tokyo, Japan.

== Biography ==
Ogasawara was born in Japan.

== Filmography ==
=== Television animation ===
Year	Title	Role	Other notes
1999	Cowboy Bebop	Meifa Puzi	
1999	Devil Lady	Ninomiya Tomoe	
2003–2004	Wolf's Rain	Cheza	
2004	Ghost in the Shell: Stand Alone Complex	Reiko Kanzaki	Episode 19
2004	Windy Tales	Atsuko	
2007	Kekkaishi	Ryo Shishio	Episode 31
2007	Mobile Suit Gundam 00	Soma Peries; Orange Haro	
2007	Oh! Edo Rocket	O-riku	
2007–2008	Mokke	Fumi Matsunaga	
2007–2008	D.Gray-man	Lulu Bell	
2007–2009	Pokémon	Honoka; Noa	
2009	Tales of Vesperia: The First Strike	Hisca Aiheap	
2010	Heroman	Holly Jones	
2010	Panty & Stocking with Garterbelt	Panty	
2010–2011	Saint Seiya: The Lost Canvas	Serinsa	
2011	Blue Exorcist	Nishiwaki	
2015	Beautiful Bones: Sakurako's Investigation	Mother; Aa-chan	
2016	Seisen Cerberus	Tomitte	
2025	New Panty & Stocking with Garterbelt	Panty	

=== Video games ===
- Super Robot Wars Z2 (Soma Peries)
- Super Robot Wars UX (Holly Jones, Soma Peries, orange Haro)

=== Dubbing roles ===
==== Live-action ====
- Lindsay Lohan
  - Freaky Friday – Anna Coleman
  - Confessions of a Teenage Drama Queen – Mary Elizabeth "Lola Steppe" Cep
  - Mean Girls – Cady Heron
  - Georgia Rule – Rachel Wilcox
  - Freakier Friday – Anna Coleman
- Alison Lohman
  - Matchstick Men – Angela
  - Flicka – Katy McLaughlin
  - Things We Lost in the Fire – Kelly
- The Accountant – Dana Cummings (Anna Kendrick)
- American Beauty – Jane Burnham (Thora Birch)
- Carriers – Kate (Emily VanCamp)
- Cheaper by the Dozen – Lorraine Baker (Hilary Duff)
- The Day After Tomorrow – Laura Chapman (Emmy Rossum)
- December Boys – Lucy (Teresa Palmer)
- Girl, Interrupted – Polly "Torch" Clark (Elisabeth Moss)
- Gran Torino – Sue Lor (Ahney Her)
- Hard Candy – Hayley Stark (Elliot Page)
- Harry Potter film series – Fleur Delacour (Clémence Poésy)
- Hostage – Jennifer Smith (Michelle Horn)
- iCarly – Shelby Marx (Victoria Justice)
- Ice Princess – Casey Carlyle (Michelle Trachtenberg)
- Imagine Me & You – Rachel (Piper Perabo)
- Katy Keene – Katy Keene (Lucy Hale)
- Nancy Drew – Nancy Drew (Emma Roberts)
- Percy Jackson & the Olympians: The Lightning Thief – Annabeth Chase (Alexandra Daddario)
- The Perfect Man – Holly Hamilton (Hilary Duff)
- Phenomena – Sophie
- Pretty Little Liars – Aria Montgomery (Lucy Hale)
- Racing Stripes – Channing Walsh (Hayden Panettiere)
- Resident Evil: Afterlife – K-Mart (Spencer Locke)
- Resident Evil: Extinction – K-Mart (Spencer Locke)
- The Seeker: The Dark Is Rising – Maggie Barnes (Amelia Warner)
- Spider-Man 3 – Gwen Stacy (Bryce Dallas Howard)
- A Tale of Two Sisters – Bae Su-yeon (Moon Geun-young)
- The United States of Leland – Becky Polard (Jena Malone)

==== Animation ====
- Kim Possible – Kim Possible
- Underdogs – Laura
