= List of Wolf's Rain characters =

This is a list of the major characters featured in Wolf's Rain, a 30 episode anime series and four episode OVA created by writer and story editor Keiko Nobumoto and BONES and directed by Tensai Okamura. It was later adapted into a short 2 tankōbon manga series with illustrations by Toshitsugu Iida.

== Wolves ==
The wolves in Wolf's Rain use illusions to give themselves a human appearance, enabling them to blend into the human world and escape detection. The wolves always retain their true nature, neither thinking nor acting as the true humans in the world do.

Kiba (キバ; lit. 'Fang')
Voiced by: Mamoru Miyano (Japanese); Johnny Yong Bosch (English, Bandai Visual dub), Darren Pleavin (English, Animax Asia dub)
The main protagonist of the series, Kiba is a white wolf who follows his instincts towards Paradise. When he was young, his pack was slaughtered when the forest he lived in was burned to the ground by Jaguara's troops. He was then found and raised by a Native-American shaman-(Voiced by: Akio Ōtsuka (Japanese); Jamieson Price (English) who told him that he had a purpose, explaining why the forest had sheltered him from the flames. The shaman told him that he would have a great journey ahead of him, and that his journey was to find Paradise. Kiba begins his quest for Paradise in the hope that he will find "a future". It is revealed later in the series that he is in fact the chosen one who is destined to find and open Paradise. Kiba tends to be impulsive and thinks with his heart rather than his head. When Kiba is first introduced, he is distrustful toward humans and in the early episodes, his pride as a wolf makes him reluctant to disguise himself as one, but that all changes when he meets Hige, who tells him that his pride won't count for much when he's dead. He's also utterly devoted to Cheza and constantly risks his life to protect her and steal her back from the nobles. At the end of the anime, Kiba manages to escape with his friends and Cheza from Jagura's fortress as the city collapses behind them and now walk towards an unknown yet hopeful future. In the OVA, Kiba seemingly dies after Darcia and Cheza do and he falls into the water. After his seeming death and the Earth's regeneration, Kiba is seen in a city in his human form where he discovered a newly grown lunar flower. His Japanese voice actor Mamoru Miyano felt Kiba was a "wolf of few words" and that his quiet nature made it hard to know what he might be thinking. Though Kiba is rarely bothered by events, Miyano did not think this was an indication that he was strong, rather he felt Kiba was attempting to hide his insecurities. In depicting the character, Miyano found it most difficult to voice the initial scene of the first episode, in which Kiba lies dying and in voice over says there is no Paradise and that there is nothing at the end. He was so nervous about shooting the first scene, he had trouble getting the lines and voicing correct, eventually freezing up completely before he was able to calm down and complete the scene.

Tsume (ツメ; lit. 'Claw')
Voiced by: Kenta Miyake (Japanese); Crispin Freeman (English, Bandai Visual dub), Victor Lee (Animax Asia dub)
Tsume is a grey wolf with a scar on his chest, and the second wolf introduced in the series. At first he lives in Freeze City where he leads a "pack" of human thieves. He clashes with Kiba over the latter's claims that Tsume has lost his pride as a wolf for living with humans, proving a worthy opponent. Later, he connects with Toboe, a young wolf who also lives in the city. Though Tsume claims he has no need for friends and that he wants nothing to do with other wolves, he comes to Toboe's aid twice and even shares a meal with him. Though he doesn't believe Kiba's stories about Paradise, he decides to leave the city with him under the excuse that he is tired of the city.
Tsume is depicted as confident, and at times arrogant, and keeps himself distant from his allies. Though he and Kiba continue to come into regular conflict, Tsume eventually comes to believe in their goal and becomes a loyal pack member. In the anime, we see in a dream of Tsume's that he had always been a lone wolf and preferred being on his own to travel the world; eventually, he found himself befriending humans more than wolves before blending in with them. In the OVA, his past is alterered in which, before moving to Freeze City, he had lived in another location with a large pack of wolves. Jaguara's wolf hunting troops attacked the pack, killing most of his family and friends. As Tsume attempted to flee from the battle, he was cast out by his pack and the alpha male attacked him, leaving him with a large X-shaped scar across his chest, branding him as a coward. Tsume eventually traveled to Freeze City where his self-loathing over his actions caused him to refuse to befriend others. Out of all of the pack, he is closest to Toboe, whom he refers to as "runt". After the young wolf is accidentally killed by Quent in the OVA (Quent dying soon after), Tsume cries over his body. Tsume is the last of the pack to remain standing with Kiba in the final battle with Darcia in the OVA. He is killed after Darcia rips open his side and legs. Before dying, he tells Kiba to go on and, as soon as Kiba leaves, whispers, "Let's meet again, next time, in Paradise..." before letting out a death howl. At the end of the OVA, Tsume is seen in his human form riding a motorcycle in a city.
Kenta Miyake felt Tsume was all about appearances and notes that Tsume always speaks in a harsh manner such as talking down to Kiba, casually dismissing Toboe, and seems to ignore Hige all together. However, he also felt that despite Tsume's seemingly tough nature, that he was the most naive of the pack and the most timid. Miyake felt as if he was Tsume's father, "kindly watching over him" and he used those feelings to guide the way he depicted the character.

Hige (ヒゲ; lit. 'Whiskers')
Voiced by: Akio Suyama (Japanese); Joshua Seth (English, Bandai Visual dub)
Hige is a Mexican wolf and the third wolf character to be introduced in the series. He seems to know how to function the best in human society, and gets along well with all the members of the pack. He tends to use his intuition more than the others. He starts off as a laid back joker, though he matures and becomes tense as the series goes on despite this, he still displays his comedic side. He has a superior sense of smell to the rest of the pack. Before Hige met Kiba, he was brainwashed into being Jaguara's lapdog by hunting and leading troops to other wolves. The collar he wears is actually a tag/transmitter that causes him to be under constant surveillance. It also appears to be the tag that controlled him, since he was plagued with constant migraines in Jaguara's city just before it was shot off by a soldier. At least 22 other wolves were collared in this way (a soldier inspecting his collar refers to him as "Number 23"), and many of the others were killed after returning to the city as seen when Tsume discovers a hall filled with stuffed wolves similar to Hige. He holds a very close relationship with Blue, convincing her to join the pack and promising not to let her die alone. Near the end of the anime, he is gravely wounded by Jaguara, but manages to escape the city with the others and joins them as they walk towards an unknown yet hopeful future. During the final battle in the OVA with wolf-formed Darcia, Blue is defeated and Hige tries to save her, only to be mortally wounded by Darcia. With Blue dead, and near death himself, Hige convinces Tsume to put him out of his misery by crushing his neck. He tells Tsume, "Let's meet again...next time in Paradise." Before the grey wolf reluctantly puts him down. After Earth's regeneration at the end of the OVA, Hige is seen in a city in his human form eating a hot dog, symbolic of his characteristic hunger. It is never really confirmed if Hige intentionally leads the pack to Jaguara's city or if his subconsciousness was manipulated by the collar, which only revealed that nature to Hige once he was inside Jaguara's city. Also, Tsume ends up making a number of direct and indirect remarks about Hige being a traitor after Jaguara's troops capture them. Voice actor Akio Suyama notes that Hige is a humorous character whose actions and lines often break the tension in an otherwise serious series. This made it fun for him to play the character.

Toboe (トオボエ, Tōboe; lit. 'Howling')
Voiced by: Hiroki Shimowada (Japanese); Mona Marshall (English, Bandai Visual dub), Candice Moore (English, Animax Asia dub)
Toboe is a red wolf and the fourth wolf to be introduced. He is the youngest of the group, often acting more like a puppy than a wolf. Toboe was raised as a pet by "Granny", an elderly woman, who he accidentally killed in an unrestrained act of playfulness. The silver bracelets are all he has left of her. Toboe maintains an affection for humans that none of the other wolves can understand (with the exception of Blue). On one occasion, Toboe saves Quent from freezing to death in the snow by sharing his body warmth with him, and is later grateful to discover that Quent has survived despite the fact that Quent immediately tries to shoot him. Toboe looks up to Tsume and usually follows him when the group splits up. He also seems to have the best hearing out of all of them. He often is more shy than bold, although when the pack is in dire threat his rage exceeds beyond his timid nature, propelling him ravenously into battle. An example of Toboe's courage is when the pack comes under attack by a large walrus, the last of his kind. As the others attack the large animal, Toboe stands frozen with fear until something 'snaps' and he lunges at the walrus's eye, refusing to let go until the beast throws itself into an iceberg, killing it. The walrus, dying, then offers its body to the wolves as food; and Toboe is rewarded by Kiba to eat first. Near the end of the anime, he is captured by Jagura's forces and imprisoned in her fortress along with Tsume, but Cheza's song empowers them to fight back and break free. By the end, he escapes along with his friends as the city collapses and joins them as they walk towards an uncertain yet hopeful future. In the OVA, Toboe unsuccessfully attempts to protect Quent from Darcia and both he and Quent are mortally wounded. Realizing that it was Toboe who saved him previously, Quent finally understands that wolves are not evil and comforts the dying wolf as his own life ebbs away. As he dies, Toboe has a vision of Paradise in which he is reunited with Granny and able to run and play as a pup. Later Tsume spends some time alone with Toboe's body and drops his tough façade to weep for his friend, even confessing the truth about his scar. After Earth's regeneration in the end of the OVA, Toboe is seen in a city in his human form holding an abandoned kitten. Hiroki Shimowada, who voices the character, felt that though Toboe was "young and inexperienced", he also acted as the go between for the other three, giving them a buffer or a bond as needed. He suggests that the other wolves keep him around because they view him as a kind son.

Blue (ブルー, Burū)
Voiced by: Mayumi Asano (Japanese); Jessica Straus (English, Bandai Visual dub), Sarah Hauser (English, Animax Asia dub)
Blue is a blue wolfdog who was a pet to the family of Quent Yaiden. After the destruction of her home and family in the village of Kyrios, she travels with Quent, hunting wolves under the belief that they were responsible for the tragedy. She lives her life as a pet dog, unaware of her wolf bloodline. Upon meeting Cheza, the wolf in her is awakened, and unable to continue hunting her own kind, she leaves Quent to travel with the pack to Paradise. She grows especially close to Hige, later telling him she will follow him wherever he goes. At the end of the anime, she happily reunites with Quent as she tells him the truth of what happened to their home and escape the city as it collapses; possibly joining Kiba and the rest of their friends as they move towards a new future. In the final episode of the OVA, after Quent's death, Blue is killed by Darcia while trying to protect Cheza, but seems content to have been with Hige at the end. She is the only wolf character not to be seen after the Earth's regeneration. It is unknown whether or not the abandoned kitten with blue eyes is her.

== Nobles ==
Darcia (ダルシア, Darushia)
Voiced by: Takaya Kuroda (Japanese); Steve Blum (English, Bandai Visual dub)
The third generation of the Darcia family of Nobles, who were said to be cursed after Darcia the First disappeared into "Paradise". Due to his grandfather's curse, Darcia is now plagued with the eye of a wolf. He seeks to use Cheza to somehow revive his lover Hamona, who has been stricken with "Paradise sickness", in which her soul is "taken by Paradise", causing her to fall into a coma. But Hamona's death changes that plan, with Darcia mysteriously disappearing after the destruction of his keep until he resurfaces at Jaguara's city, discovering that she (being Hamona's older sister) caused her death out of jealousy so she could have him to herself. Despite being poisoned by Jaguara, he still manages to slay her. He then goes deeper into the Black City as it collapses and presumably dies. In the OVA, Darcia instead escapes and his poisoning is never mentioned. After avenging Hamona's death, he discards his love for her, saying that "she is nowhere now", and assumes the form of a giant, dark-furred wolf. In this continuity, Darcia claims to descended from a clan of wolves that chose to become completely human. He viciously kills off all the members of Kiba's pack one by one. He shoots Quent while still in human form, and in wolf form defeats and kills Blue, Hige, and Tsume, as none of them are a match for him in his wolf form. After eliminating Kiba's pack and grievously wounding Kiba, he ends up being poisoned by Cheza's blood from biting her and walks towards what he believes to be the entrance to Paradise only to be incinerated, leaving his wolf's eye behind to taint the new world. Darcia serves as the main antagonist of the OVA.

Jaguara (ジャガラ卿, Jagara-kyō)
Voiced by: Atsuko Tanaka (Japanese); Mary Elizabeth McGlynn (English, Bandai Visual dub)
Part of one of the three feuding Noble Families, Jaguara fell in love with Darcia to the point of obsession but was rejected by him for her younger twin sister, something which she never forgave Hamona for. She began to set up an ancient spell used by Lord Darcia the First to create a 'Noble's Paradise' to please and lure Darcia to her, abducting Cheza from Darcia's Keep. In the process, she ordered the murder of Hamona and soon struck out to eliminate the wolves, who were heading to her domain. But her plan ended in failure when her plans were thwarted by the wolves. She was slain by Darcia while her city fell into chaos. There's a possibility that Jaguara and Hamona are identical twins since Jaguara bears a striking resemblance to her sister when she's not wearing her armor. She serves as the main antagonist of the anime.

== Humans ==
Cheza (チェザ, Cheza)
Voiced by: Arisa Ogasawara (Japanese); Sherry Lynn (English, Bandai Visual dub), Andrea Kwan (English, Animax Asia dub)
Cheza is the Flower Maiden (花の娘, hana no musume), a girl who was artificially created from a Lunar Flower by the noble Darcia the First using the lost art of alchemy. She is the key to opening Paradise. First appearing in a state of suspended animation within a scientific research lab, she was awakened by the smell of wolf's blood spilled in the brief fight between Tsume and Kiba. After the wolves steal her away, she is pursued by various other characters, forcing the pack to protect her constantly. She shares a special bond with the wolves, especially Kiba, showing the ability to heal their wounds or sing them to sleep, and suffering when they are injured. Her eyes are pink with dark red sclera, and she is implied to be blind during a scene in which she almost walks over the edge of a cliff but regains her footing apparently by touch. As a flower, Cheza becomes weak when deprived of water and sunlight. In the OVA, her blood is poisonous when ingested (which leads to Darcia's downfall after he bites her in the OVA). At the gates of Paradise in the OVA, she 'blooms' into an elongated, tree-like form before dissolving into thousands of spherical seeds which begin sprouting more Lunar Flowers. After Earth's reincarnation, a Lunar Flower is seen sitting in an alleyway and it is implied to be Cheza. In both the anime and the OVA, she often refers to herself in third person, as she calls herself "this one".

Hubb Lebowski (ハブ・リボウスキー, Habu Ribōsukī)
Voiced by: Mitsuru Miyamoto (Japanese); Bob Buchholz (English, Bandai Visual dub)
Hubb Lebowski is a police detective and ex-husband of Cher Degré. He is still very much in love with Cher and seeks to protect her, often half-jokingly asking if they still have a chance together. After Quent shot Kiba, he was detained and questioned by the police, including Hubb, at which point Quent said that the animal he had shot was no mere dog, but a wolf. After hearing this Hubb begins to obsess over the matter. He finds a copy of the banned Book of the Moon in Cher's apartment after she leaves to hunt Cheza with a commander of the army employed by Lord Orkam. Reading through the book, Hubb becomes completely and utterly enthralled with wolves and teams up with Quent as he continues his search for Cher. He reunites with Cher and helps her get Cheza out of Jagura's keep at the end of the anime and together they leave towards an unknown future. His death occurs in the OVA when he commits suicide while climbing up a cliff in the next to last episode. A violent earthquake loosens his hold and, rather than have anyone risk themselves to save him, he lets go. In his final moments he is seen placing a cigar in his mouth and inhaling the scent of Cher from her scarf.

Cher Degré (シェール・ドゥグレ, Shēru Dugure)
Voiced by: Kaho Koda (Japanese); Kari Wahlgren (English, Bandai Visual dub), Andrea Kwan (Animax Asia dub)
Cher Degré is a scientist involved in studying Cheza. She is fascinated by Cheza and desires to understand her and her purpose. She and Hubb were once married, but divorced after her work with Cheza became more important than their marriage. She spends time for a while with Lord Darcia who divulges in her the history of his family and his motives surrounding Cheza. It's unknown exactly why Darcia chooses to open up to her. She is reunited later on with Hubb who had spent the first part of the series searching for her, where after it is implied she still loves him. Together, they help the wolves rescue Cheza from Jagura's keep in the end of the anime and escape in the way of a new future. In the first episode of the OVA, Cher dies when the car she was riding in flips over and then plummets down a cliff. Snowflakes fall as Hubb holds her dead body and weeps before laying her to rest in the freezing waters.

Quent Yaiden (クエント・ヤイデン, Kuento Yaiden)
Voiced by: Unsho Ishizuka (Japanese); Tom Wyner (English, Bandai Visual dub), Rik Thomas (English, Animax Asia dub)
Quent Yaiden is an ex-sheriff from the town of Kyrios. The destruction of his village and the killing of his wife and son Russe by what he thought was a pack of wolves led to his deep and abiding hatred for wolves, which is rivaled only by his perpetual desire for a stiff drink. He lives a life on the go with only his dog, Blue, to keep him company and aid him in his pursuit of wolves to kill. Along the way, he grows disillusioned at seeing the world in its polluted state and even admits to the world being bad when his family was still around. Quent's suspicions of the existence of wolves is always scoffed at by those who believe wolves are extinct, but when he meets Toboe for the first time in Freeze City, his purpose is refueled. After Blue discovers her relations to the wolves, Quent struggles between his hatred for wolves and the newfound knowledge that they weren't responsible for the death of his family. He decides that Blue should not be his dog anymore, that she should be free. In the final episode of the anime, he reunites with Blue who reveals who she is by calling him "Pops" (the nickname everyone in his home often referred to him as) as the truth is known to them and they escape the collapsing city together to presumably meet up with the others as they proceed towards the new future. During a confrontation with Darcia in the OVA, Quent accidentally shoots and kills Toboe before being shot by Darcia. In his dying moments, he apologetically strokes Toboe, realizing that Toboe was the one to keep him from freezing to death earlier in the series. He dies with his arm around Toboe.

== Others ==
Leara (リアラ, Riara)
Voiced by: Eri Sendai (Japanese); Michelle Ruff (English, Bandai Visual dub)
Leara is a Freeze Town girl who sees Toboe in his wolf form and feeds him a piece of sausage. Her past isn't shown in the series and she rarely appears after the recap episode 16. Toboe was seen to like her because of her hospitality and later sought her out in human form. However she discovers he is a wolf after he accidentally kills her pet falcon and reveals his true form by howling as he grieves.

Gehl (ゲイル, Geiru)
Voiced by: Koki Akaishi (Japanese); Brianne Siddall (English, Bandai Visual dub)
Gehl

.He is a 16 year old boy but he looks younger Is one of the members of Tsume's group in Freeze City. He is a shy boy who attempts to be brave when Tsume told him to stand by in the second mission. Unfortunately in the group's last mission, Gehl falls off a bridge running from a rain of bullets. Tsume runs to catch him but the pain of being bitten dissolves Tsume's human illusion, and Gehl's scream causes Tsume to release his hold, letting Gehl fall to his death. Later his body is shown to Hubb Lebowski to be examined, and he appears again in the recap episodes.

Lady Harmona
Voiced by: Maaya Sakamoto (Japanese); Peggy O'Neal (English, Bandai Visual dub)
Lady Harmona is Lady Jaguara's beautiful and gentle younger sister, whom Darcia fell deeply in love. Jaguara has hated Harmona ever since, because Jaguara loved Darcia too. Harmona eventually fell victim to "Paradise Sickness", where her soul began slipping into Paradise, leaving her in a comatose state. She became Darcia's motivation behind creating Cheza, hoping to use her to bring Harmona back to him. She is eventually killed by Jaguara's forces during their assault on Darcia's keep, leaving Darcia broken.

Mew (ミュウ, Myū)
Voiced by: Yuna Inamura (Japanese); Julie Maddalena (English, Bandai Visual dub)
Mew is a caracal who Kiba meets at the Garden of Eternity in and they become good friends in Episode 19. She cannot remember who or where she is and cannot leave the Garden due to having been there so long. Later, when Kiba's spirit returns to the pack without her, they joke about Kiba meeting Mew, as Tsume says that "I thought you seemed less uptight" though Toboe doesn't know what they mean by that.

== Reception ==
The characters of Wolf's Rain have received praise and criticism from several publications for anime, manga, and other media. Sci Fi Weekly's Tasha Robinson initially found the interactions between the wolves to be tiresome and repetitive. However, they praised the series for having the wolves clearly act as wolves, noting that "lot of the series' most interesting dynamics come from wolves behaving like wolves in human environments —breaking up into packs (complete with obvious hierarchies), challenging each other for dominance, only incidental respect towards humans, fighting to defend their turf and so forth."

== See also ==
- List of Wolf's Rain episodes
