= Metalchicks =

Japanese rock band

Metalchicks are a Japanese rock duo supergroup. Their second album, St. Wonder, was the soundtrack to the 2006 film Warau Michael (distributed internationally as Arch Angels). Metalchicks also composed the soundtrack of anime series Heroman. The group regularly performs in Japan, and played at SXSW 2007 in the United States.

== Members ==
- Sugar Yoshinaga – guitar, bass (of Buffalo Daughter)
- Yuka Yoshimura – drums, percussion (of Catsuomaticdeath, formerly of DMBQ and OOIOO)

== Discography ==
- Metalchicks (self-titled debut)
- St. Wonder

== Bibliography ==
- Despes, Shawn. Metalchicks "St. Wonder" Japan Times. Retrieved 2009-09-27.
- Rock, dance collide at outdoor fest Japan Times. Retrieved 2009-09-27.
- Metalchicks with Kiiiiiii and Asa-Chang & Junrei Smashing Mag. Retrieved 2009-09-27.
- MetalChicks review Keikaku.net Retrieved 2009-09-27.
- Beets, Greg. Japaniversary -Japan, China, and southward along the Pacific Rim Austin Chronicle. Retrieved 2009-09-27.
- CMJ 2006 Artist Showcases Pop Matters. Retrieved 2009-09-27.
