= Warau Michael =

Japanese manga series by Izumi Kawahara

笑う大天使
- Genre: Comedy, supernatural
- Manga
- Written by: Izumi Kawahara
- Published by: Hakusensha
- Imprint: Hana to Yume Comics
- Magazine: Hana to Yume
- Original run: 1987 – 1988
- Volumes: 3
- Live-action film
- Directed by: Issei Oda
- Produced by: Dai Miyazaki; Issei Shibata
- Written by: Genki Yoshimura; Issei Oda
- Music by: Metalchicks
- Released: July 15, 2006
- Runtime: 92 minutes

Warau Michael (Japanese: 笑う大天使, Hepburn: Warau Mikaeru; "Laughing Michael") is a Japanese comedy manga series written and illustrated by Izumi Kawahara. It was serialized in the shōjo manga magazine Hana to Yume from 1987 to 1988 and later collected as three tankōbon volumes by Hakusensha. Warau Michael was adapted into a live-action film directed by Issei Oda in 2006. Its soundtrack was composed by rock duo supergroup Metalchicks. The film was screened internationally under the title Arch Angels and licensed for distribution in North America by Sentai Filmworks in 2016.

== Characters ==
Fumio Shijō (司城 史緒, Shijō Fumio)
Portrayed by: Juri Ueno
Kazune Saiki (斎木 和音, Saiki Kazune)
Portrayed by: Megumi Seki
Yuzuko Sarashina (更科 柚子, Sarashina Yuzuko)
Portrayed by: Airi Taira
Kazuomi Shijō (司城 一臣, Shijō Kazuomi)
Portrayed by: Yusuke Iseya
Nobuko Sakurai (桜井 敦子, Sakurai Nobuko)
Portrayed by: Rinko Kikuchi
