= Mass Alert =

Japanese musician from Nagasaki (born 1982)

- Born: April 12, 1982 (age 44)
- Origin: Nagasaki, Nagasaki Prefecture, Japan
- Genres: J-Pop, J-Rock, J-Hiphop
- Occupation: Postal worker
- Years active: 2009-Present
- Label: SME Records
- Website: www.massalert.jp

Mass Alert (マサラー, Masarā) is a Japanese musician from Nagasaki. He debuted in 2009 with the song "Comoesta" featuring Massattack from Spontania. He gained prominence in Japan after he provided an opening theme for Naruto: Shōnen Hen, and then the second ending theme for Heroman. He describes himself as the postman singer, referring to his previous career.

== Discography ==
=== Singles ===
- "Comoesta" feat. Massattack from Spontania - July 22, 2009
- "Chiisana one for all" (小さな one for all; "Little one for all") feat. BAKI - November 4, 2009
- "Tada Yowai Dake ja Nakute Bokura wa..." (ただ弱いだけじゃなくて僕らは…; "We Are Not Only Weak But...") - May 26, 2010
  - Naruto: Shōnen Hen opening theme (Episodes 68 - Current)
- "Boku no Te wa Kimi no Tame ni" (僕の手は君の為に; "My Hands For You") - August 25, 2010
  - Heroman ending theme (Episodes 13 - Current)
