= Heroman =

Japanese manga and anime

- The cover of the Heroman manga, Vol. 1
- Genre: Superhero
- Created by: Stan Lee; Bones
- Manga
- Written by: Stan Lee
- Illustrated by: Tamon Ohta
- Published by: Square Enix
- English publisher: NA: Vertical, Inc.
- Imprint: Gangan Comics
- Magazine: Monthly Shōnen Gangan
- Original run: August 12, 2009 – October 12, 2011
- Volumes: 5
- Anime television series
- Directed by: Hitoshi Nanba
- Produced by: Masahiko Minami
- Written by: Akatsuki Yamatoya
- Music by: Metalchicks
- Studio: Bones
- Licensed by: Crunchyroll: PH: Creative Programs Inc.
- Original network: TXN (TV Tokyo)
- English network: PH: ABS-CBN, Hero, Studio 23, Yey!; SEA: Disney XD
- Original run: April 1, 2010 – September 23, 2010
- Episodes: 26

Heroman (stylized as HEROMAN) is a Japanese manga and anime series created by Marvel's Stan Lee and Bones. The manga was published in Square Enix's magazine Monthly Shōnen Gangan from August 2009 to October 2011, with its chapters collected in five tankōbon volumes. The 26-episode anime television series was broadcast on TV Tokyo from April to September 2010. Lee came up with the series' basic plot, referring to the series and character as "a new hero for the 21st century".

== Synopsis ==
Orphaned American little boy Joey lives with his grandmother, working at a restaurant in the West Coast city of Center City (センターシティ, Sentā Shiti; based on Los Angeles), while going to school. Upon hearing of a new toy robot called the Heybo, Joey believes that getting one will make his life better, turning him into a hero to protect his friends and family. However, he cannot afford to buy it on his meager salary. His luck changes when he picks up a broken down Heybo abandoned by a school bully. He tries to fix it, naming it Heroman, but does not have any luck in getting it to work. However, when it gets struck by a bolt of strange lightning, it transforms into a giant robot, just in time to save his friend Lina from impending danger. Now, Joey and Heroman are Earth's only defense against the evil insectoid Skrugg (スクラッグ, Sukuraggu) aliens, unknowingly summoned to Earth by Joey's science teacher.

There are some differences in story between the anime and manga series.

== Characters ==
=== Main characters ===
Joseph Carter "Joey" Jones (ジョセフ・カーター・"ジョーイ"・ジョーンズ, Josefu Kātā "Jōi" Jōnzu)
Voiced by: Mikako Komatsu
Joey is an orphaned little boy living with his grandmother, working at a restaurant to make ends meet. His life changes when he fixes the Heybo that he names Heroman. He is able to issue commands to Heroman via a controller that forms a gauntlet around his left hand. This controller also gives Joey his own powers, such as super speed and the ability to create force fields. At the battle in the end of the series, Joey's left hand merges further with the gauntlet and gains even more power, transforming into an energy-like being with a massive left arm. This carries the risk of permanently corrupting him until he is reminded of his bond with Heroman.
The name "Joey Jones" was selected by Minami at the behest of Stan Lee to choose an alliterative name, much like various other Marvel protagonists such as Peter Parker.
Komatsu was chosen to voice Joey because of her girlish voice and the difficulty in finding a young man that had the voice the production team wanted.
Heroman (ヒーローマン, Hīrōman)
Voiced by: Ryōta Takeuchi
Originally a broken down toy robot called Heybo, Heroman is brought to life by a strange bolt of lightning and turns into a giant robot (in the anime, this lightning is caused by the Skrugg fleet heading towards Earth). He uses his powerful fists and electrical powers to protect Earth from the Skrugg and other threats. Although unable to speak, he is able to sense Joey's feelings and use his powers accordingly. This empathetic link can cause Heroman to enter a sort of berserker state when Joey is overwhelmed by negative feelings, relentlessly and violently attacking anything he perceives as a threat. Heroman is literally born from lightning and such any form of electric energy, man-made or otherwise, can be used to replenish his strength. Conversely, absorbing electric energy from his body weakens him greatly. Heroman has various modes that can be activated through Joey's control gauntlet, including "Blast", which powers him up, "Augment", which causes him to grow several meters high, and "O Spark", which allows him to fire a massive blast of energy from the red ring on his body. Near the end of the series, the NIA outfits Heroman with special armor with an attached glider and heads-up display. Heroman's face bears a striking resemblance to that of Joey's deceased father.
Heroman's design is based on that of the robot Leopardon from the 1978 tokusatsu version of Spider-Man.
Simon "Psy" Kaina (サイモン・"サイ"・カイナ, Saimon "Sai" Kaina)
Voiced by: Ryōhei Kimura
Psy is Joey's best friend and classmate. He uses crutches to help him walk after a serious accident during a football game in the past left him injured, an accident to which Will, at that time captain of their football team and harboring a deep rivalry with Psy, still feels the blame. However, he also has a G-wheel, a motorized skateboard that helps him get around quickly. He also uses a guitar built by Professor Denton that uses high pitched sound to stun Skrugg. In the English translation of the manga his name is spelt "Cy".
Lina Davis (リナ・デイヴィス, Rina Deivisu)
Voiced by: Mayu Obata
Lina is one of Joey's classmates and is a cheerleader at Center City Middle School. She is from a wealthy family who fears that because Joey is poor and uncultured, he is a bad influence on her, but she likes him anyway. She is the little sister of Will, and despite the obvious disdain, hostility and bullying shown by Will towards Joey, she's overtly protective of both of them.
Professor Matthew Denton (マシュー・"教授"・デントン, Mashū "Kyōju" Denton)
Voiced by: Chō
Professor Denton is Joey's science teacher and an alien otaku. It is his experiments with extraterrestrial communication that drive the Skrugg to invade Earth. This guilt motivates him to help Joey and Heroman whenever possible, even if it endangers himself.

=== Center City residents ===
William "Will" Davis (ウイリアム・"ウィル"・デイヴィス, Uiriamu "Wiru" Deivisu)
Voiced by: Makoto Yasumura
Will is Lina's older brother and an American football player at CCMS. He bullies Joey to keep him away from Lina and puts himself at risk in order to prove himself a better hero than Joey is. In the anime, he is captured by the Skrugg and turned into one himself, with strength comparable to Heroman. However, thanks to the efforts of Joey and Lina, he breaks free from his brainwashing. After the Skrugg's base is destroyed, Will disappears to parts unknown as he knows he cannot live among humans anymore due to his Skrugg condition. However, Will resurfaces to destroy any remaining evidence of the Skrugg while warning Joey that something is coming. Later on in the anime, Will is seen with his Skrugg mutation progressed even further, now covered in chitinous armor. He helps Joey and Heroman with their assault on the resurrected Gogorr. His fate following the final battle is unknown.
Nicholas "Nick" de Carlo (ニコラス・"ニック"・デ・カルロ, Nikorasu "Nikku" De Karuro)
Voiced by: Akio Suyama
Nick is Will's best friend and also bullies Joey. The Heybo that becomes Heroman originally belonged to Nick, but he threw it away after it got hit by a car and he decided that buying a new one would be easier than fixing the broken one. In the anime, he is also captured and turned into a Skrugg. However, unlike Will who tries to fight the brainwashing, Nick revels in the new power, having always been weak. However, during a battle with Joey, he becomes trapped under falling debris, his fate unknown.
Vera Collins (ヴェラ・コリンズ, Vera Korinzu)
Voiced by: Naomi Shindō
Vera is Joey's mathematics and homeroom teacher. She inadvertently discovers Heroman when she is trying to keep Professor Denton, Joey, and Psy out of trouble. She keeps the secret of Joey's involvement with Heroman, until it is outed on TV.
Shindō also acts as the show's narrator.
Hilly (ヒリー, Hirī)
Voiced by: Katsumi Chō
Hilly owns the café where Joey works part-time.
Stan (スタン, Sutan)
Voiced by: Atsushi Ii
This caricature of Stan Lee appears multiple times in the anime and manga. He is primarily seen as a patron of Hilly's, often demanding more coffee from Joey.
Lina's Father (リナのパパ, Rina no Papa)
Voiced by: Kōji Ishii
Lina and Will's Father who runs a multitude of businesses. He is somewhat distrustful of Joey, as he tends to take Will's word over Lina's. After the Skrugg attack, he spends his time and money helping with the reconstruction of the city. He's one of the several civilians, along with his wife, to follow Keisha's report of the battle between Joey and Gogorr, gaining some more respect of the youngsters. Furthermore, when a distressed Lina escapes from home, Lina's father enlists Joey help, acknowledging that, despite their differences, Joey cares for his daughter.

=== Joey's family ===
Virginia "Grandma" Jones (バージニア・"おばあちゃん"・ジョーンズ, Bājinia "Obaachan" Jōnzu;)
Voiced by: Sumie Sakai
Virginia is Joey's and Holly's paternal grandmother who has been caring for them since their parents died. She enjoys listening to classic rock from the 60s and 70s.
Holly Virginia Jones (ホリー・バージニア・ジョーンズ, Horī Bājinia Jōnzu)
Voiced by: Arisa Ogasawara
Holly is Joey's older sister who has been touring with her rock band on the East Coast until she hears about the Skrugg invasion and returns home to Center City, three months late. When she accidentally sees Heroman, she decides to stay in Center City. While she generally teases Joey any opportunity she gets, she worries whenever she thinks Joey might be in danger. Holly was named after her grandmother. Holly initially holds long-standing resentment towards her father, seeing his death as abandoning the family.
Brian Carter Jones (ブライアン・カーター・ジョーンズ, Buraian Kātā Jōnzu)
Voiced by: Tesshō Genda
Brian is Joey and Holly's father and Virginia's son, who died in a coal mining accident in the 1990s, during which he saved everyone else trapped in the mine with him. The only thing that the rescue parties could find of him was his helmet, within which he kept a photo of his family to motivate him. This gave him the odd habit of tapping his helmet with a finger whenever he put it on, a reminder of the picture underneath.
Catherine Mae Jones (キャサリン・メイ・ジョーンズ, Kyasarin Mei Jōnzu)
Voiced by: Satsuki Yukino
Joey and Holly's mother, who died in 2003. After Brian dies, she raises Joey and Holly on her own until she dies at a young age. It is noted that she always put on a cheerful facade in front of her children, only showing her true emotions when she was alone.

=== Skrugg ===
The Skrugg (スクラッグ, Sukuraggu) are an evil race of cockroach-like aliens, led by Kogorr, who travel to Earth in order to invade it after being inadvertently contacted by Denton. They have powerful armor that can withstand the majority of Earth's weaponry. Their own arsenal includes laser pistols, as well as powerful shoulder cannons that convert air into a powerful energy blast. Besides the strength Heroman is capable of, they are also weakened by high pitched noises due to their manner of communication.

Gogorr (ゴゴール, Gogōru)
Voiced by: Unshō Ishizuka
Gogorr is the cockroach-like leader of the Skrugg who leads his kind to Earth to strip it of its natural resources. Much larger than ordinary Skrugg, Gogorr can mutate his body in different forms, each one with special traits. His normal form permits him to attack with his antenna to hit enemies from a distance, while one of his alternate forms is stronger in hand-to-hand combat and the other has wings that allow him to fly at great speed. He is destroyed when Heroman defeats him and blows up his base, but the remaining Skrugg much later manage to track down one of the power crystals held in Gogorr's chest, now held in a government facility, and resurrect him in a more powerful, cannibalistic form, able to dish out grievous damage to Heroman before being stopped by the combined efforts of Joey and his friends. His name is alternately spelled "Kogorr."
Skrugg Soldiers (スクラッグ兵, Sukuraggu Hei)
Voiced by: Jun Konno
Skrugg Operator (スクラッグオペレーター, Sukuraggu Operētā)
Voiced by: Ryōta Takeuchi

=== Generas Industry ===
Doctor Minami (ドクターミナミ, Dokutā Minami)
Voiced by: Yasunori Matsumoto
Doctor Minami is a scientist who heads the Generas Industry (ジェネラス・インダストリー, Jenerasu Indasutorī) weapon developing company, a front for the robotics research laboratory MRL. He is first seen approaching the President with a plan to confront the Skrugg, take possession of their advanced technology in the process, and show MRL's advancements in robotics to win the U.S. government's favor. However, his plans are foiled when Joey and his friends manage to defeat the Skrugg by themselves before he and his team take action, and since he finds out about Heroman, he makes use of his resources and influence to prove the superiority of his inventions by defeating it in combat before ending up in jail. At the end of the series, Veronica releases Doctor Minami, Amanorich, and Stallion from prison.
Amanorich (アマノリッヒ, Amanorihhi)
Voiced by: Anri Katsu
Amanorich is one of MRL's top researchers. Even though he is a nihilist, he wears 3-D glasses to see the world in a different color.
Stallion (スタリオン, Sutarion)
Voiced by: Masafumi Kimura
Stallion is one of MRL's top researchers. He is always seen wearing thick machinist gloves.
Veronica (ヴェロニカ, Veronika)
Voiced by: Ryoko Gi
Veronica is Doctor Minami's exclusive secretary. Not much is known about her.
MR-1
The MR-1 is Generas Industry's experimental giant robot, originally built to fight the Skrugg until Heroman beat it to the punch and was used as a dump truck instead in the reconstruction of Center City. The robot is later used by Minami to act out his grudge against Heroman.

=== American government ===
Axel Hughes (アクセル・ヒューズ, Akuseru Hyūzu)
Voiced by: Hiroki Tōchi
Hughes is an agent of the National Intelligence Agency (NIA), a group that reports directly to the President. He is sent to Center City to investigate the mysterious events following the Skrugg's defeat, particularly Heroman, who the government has code named "Ghost" (ゴースト, Gōsuto). He later comes to understand Joey and becomes his ally, giving Joey and Heroman the NIA's full support.
President (大統領, Daitōryō)
Voiced by: Bin Sasaki
The President of the United States. He is reluctant in using nuclear weapons to combat the Skrugg, until Dr. Minami comes with an alternative.
Watkins (ワトキンス, Watokins)
Voiced by: Yōsuke Akimoto
Watkins is an aide to the President.
Elmer Howard (エルマー・ハワード, Erumā Hawādo)
Voiced by: Hirofumi Nojima
Elmer Howard is an NIA agent working under Hughes.
Ravi
A scientist that accidentally created the plant monster Shapeshifter.

=== All American Network ===
The All American Network (AAN) is a television station based in Center City.

Keisha Jackson (キーシャ・ジャクソン, Kīsha Jakuson)
Voiced by: Eri Miyajima
Keisha is a reporter for the AAN (All American Network) news. When she sees that her coverage of the fight between the Ghost (Heroman) and the MR-1 is altered, she started to follow closely the developments regarding Heroman and the U.S. government looking for a scoop. During the last stand against Gogorr, she inadvertently discovers, and outs to the entire world, the relation between Joey and Heroman, eliciting the world sympathy for the youngster.
Leo (レオ, Reo)
Voiced by: Kohji Hiwatari
Leo is a cameraman for AAN. Like Keisha, he also becomes upset when his footage of the fight is altered, as he wants to get the truth out to the public.

=== Manga-exclusive characters ===
Grudge (グラジ, Guraji)
Grudge is a spirit possessing an ancient suit of armor. He feeds off the grudges of people and possesses them in order to carry them out. He possesses the owner of an antique store which was being threatened with being closed down by Lina's father due to a lack of business. He kidnaps Lina in the hopes of a large ransom, but is defeated by the appearance of Heroman.
Ezzi (エッズィ)
Ezzi is a powerful Skrugg forged from the DNA of a praying mantis. As well as having command over other praying mantises, using them to spy on Joey and his friends, Ezzi also wields powerful mantis-like scythes on his arms, which are strong enough to seriously damage Heroman's armor.
Burito (ブリト)
Burito is a powerful Skrugg forged from the DNA of a pill-bug.
Paua (パウア)
Paua is a powerful Skrugg forged from the DNA of a rhinoceros beetle and stag beetle.

== Media ==
=== Manga ===
A manga adaptation of Heroman, illustrated by Tamon Ohta, was serialized in Square Enix's Monthly Shōnen Gangan from August 12, 2009, to October 12, 2011. Square Enix collected its chapters in five tankōbon volumes, released from March 20, 2010, to December 22, 2011.

In North America, the manga was licensed for English release by Vertical. The five volumes were released from October 30, 2012, to July 23, 2013.

=== Anime ===
The anime series, produced by Bones, POW! Entertainment and Wowmax Media spawned 26 episodes, and aired on TV Tokyo and related stations between April 1, 2010, and September 23, 2010. It was also streamed on Crunchyroll. The series' music is composed by Metalchicks and Music Heroes. For episodes 1–12, the opening theme is "Roulette" performed by Tetsuya of L'Arc-en-Ciel while the ending theme is "CALLING" performed by Flow. An insert song by Tatsuyuki Hashimoto featuring ACO on vocals titled "Niji no Fumoto" (虹のふもと; "At the Edge of the Rainbow") was featured in episode 11. From episode 13 onwards, the opening theme is "missing" by Kylee while the ending theme is "Boku no Te wa Kimi no Tame ni" (僕の手は君の為に; "My Hands For You") by Mass Alert. A promotional video released prior to the premiere of the series featured a song performed by Hajime Uchiyama with Slavomir Kowalewski on vocals, eventually revealed to be titled "Joey and Heroman" when it was included on the series' soundtrack.
