= Wolf's Rain =

Japanese anime television series and its manga adaptation

- Cover of the anime's first Japanese DVD volume
- Genre: Dark fantasy; Dystopian; Post-apocalyptic
- Created by: Keiko Nobumoto
- Anime television series
- Directed by: Tensai Okamura
- Produced by: Masahiko Minami; Minoru Takanashi; Go Haruna
- Written by: Keiko Nobumoto
- Music by: Yoko Kanno
- Studio: Bones
- Licensed by: AUS: Madman Entertainment; NA: Funimation; UK: Anime Limited
- Original network: Fuji TV
- English network: IN: Animax; SEA: Animax; UK: Rapture TV, AnimeCentral, Vice on TV; US: Adult Swim; ZA: Animax
- Original run: January 6, 2003 – July 29, 2003; OVA releases: January 23, 2004 – February 25, 2004
- Episodes: 26 + 4 OVAs
- Manga
- Written by: Keiko Nobumoto
- Illustrated by: Toshitsugu Iida
- Published by: Kodansha
- English publisher: NA: Viz Media
- Magazine: Magazine Z
- Original run: July 23, 2003 – February 23, 2004
- Volumes: 2
- icon

Wolf's Rain (stylized in all caps) is a Japanese anime television series created by writer Keiko Nobumoto and produced by Bones. It was directed by Tensai Okamura and featured character designs by Toshihiro Kawamoto with a soundtrack produced and arranged by Yoko Kanno. It focuses on the journey of four lone wolves who cross paths while following the scent of the Lunar Flower and seeking Paradise.

Wolf's Rain spans twenty-six television episodes and four original video animation (OVA) episodes, with each episode running approximately twenty-three minutes. The series was originally broadcast in Japan on Fuji TV, some of Fuji TV's affiliate stations, and the anime CS television network, Animax. The complete thirty episode series is licensed for a North American release by Funimation, in Europe by Beez Entertainment and in Australia and New Zealand by Madman Entertainment. The series was adapted into a short two-volume manga series written by Keiko Nobumoto and illustrated by Toshitsugu Iida. The manga, which was released while the series was airing, is a retelling of the story rather than a straight adaptation. It was originally serialized in Magazine Z and has been released in North America by Viz Media.

The anime series was well received in Japan, being the third-ranked anime series in its timeslot while airing on Fuji TV. The Bandai Entertainment English-language release sold well in North America. It helped Bandai gain the 2004 Anime Company of the Year award from industry news company ICv2 in the ICv2 Retailers Guide to Anime/Manga. The manga adaptation was selected as one of their top ten anime products of 2005 and sold well in North America. Reviewers of the series gave it high marks for characterization, emotional weight, visual presentation, narrative and its soundtrack, while disparaging the existence of four recapitulation episodes in the middle of the series. The manga adaptation also sold well in North America and received good reviews, though reviewers felt its short length resulted in a rushed plot and neglected supporting characters.

== Plot ==
According to an old legend, when the end of the world comes, a place known as Paradise will appear. However, only wolves will know how to find it. Although wolves are believed to have been hunted to extinction nearly two hundred years ago, they still exist, surviving by casting illusions over themselves to make them appear human. Freeze City is a northern human city set in Russia, in a world where the majority of people live in poverty and hardship.

Kiba, an injured lone white wolf, goes to Freeze City following the scent of the Lunar Flower, which is the key to opening Paradise. There he encounters Tsume, Hige and Toboe, three other wolves who were drawn to Freeze City by the scent of the Lunar Flower and are now living in the city. The wolves encounter Quent Yaiden, a former Sheriff of Kyrios who is obsessed with hunting down wolves, and his dog Blue. Cheza, the Flower Maiden who is destined to lead the wolves to Paradise, is being studied at a laboratory under the care of Cher Degré. She is awakened by the smell of the wolf's blood. As Kiba and Hige approach the lab to find her, she is stolen away by Lord Darcia the Third, whose people created Cheza.

With the Flower Maiden gone, the wolves have no reason to stay in the city. Despite some initial misgivings and suspicions, they decide to stay together and follow Kiba in his search for the Flower Maiden and Paradise. As they pursue Cheza, the wolves travel through various cities and the remnants of former habitations. Cher joins the city's army to try to recover Cheza, while Cher's ex-husband Hubb Lebowski searches desperately for Cher, and Quent continues his relentless pursuit of the wolves. When Blue eventually encounters Cheza, it awakens her wolf blood from dormancy and causes her to leave Quent and take on her human form. She joins the wolves and travels with them for a while, developing an intense and close romantic relationship with Hige, and meanwhile, Hubb finds himself traveling with Quent, who is now searching for Blue as well as the wolves. Hubb eventually finds Cher and from there they continue their pursuit of the wolves to find Cheza.

Together the wolves reach Darcia's keep after Kiba goes off on his own. Hubb, Cher, and Quent arrive in the keep, and Tsume, Toboe, and Hige find Kiba, Cheza, and Darcia during a sword fight between Darcia and Kiba. However, the reunion is short-lived when the Noble Jaguara troops attack, destroying the keep in the process. The troops capture Cheza, Hubb, Cher, and Blue during the raid, and the wolves get separated from Kiba. After finding Kiba, the wolves continue their journey to rescue Cheza from Jaguara, while Cher rescues Blue and manages to find Cheza with help from Hubb, but Jaguara's troops instantly recapture Cheza, taking Hubb with them and forcing Cher and Blue to find Cheza on their own.

The wolves and the humans eventually come together in Jaguara's city, where the captured Cheza is being held. In attempting to rescue the abducted Cheza, Kiba, Tsume, and Toboe are captured. Tsume and Toboe are thrown into a dungeon with Hubb while Jaguara attempts to use Kiba's blood to force Paradise to open. Meanwhile, Hige and Blue are reunited outside the Keep, where he remembers that he had once worked for Jaguara and decides to rescue his friends, but not before telling Blue to stay outside and promising her that he will return to her no matter what. While waiting for Hige, Blue is reunited with her master Quent and meanwhile, Darcia, having survived the attack on his keep, interrupts Jaguara's ceremony as Kiba and the other wolves break free and rush to free the Flower Maiden. Hige is wounded during the fight against Jaguara and Kiba arrives after Darcia is poisoned by the Noble. Darcia battles Jaguara along with Kiba and finally slays her as the keep begins to collapse, ending the anime's original 26-episode run.

As the original video animation (OVA) episodes begin, the wolves and the humans escape Jaguara's city, which has fallen into chaos. Quent is gravely wounded saving Blue from an oncoming vehicle, but he and Blue are found by Hubb and Cher, and subsequently by the wolves and Cheza. Together, they all continue making their way to Paradise, pursued by the now insane Darcia. As the Earth begins to fall into destruction, Cher dies when the car falls off a cliff. Soon after, Toboe is accidentally shot by Quent when he tries to shoot Darcia who in turn kills Quent. Hubb tries to keep up with the remaining wolves climbing up a mountain but falls to his death. Darcia attacks the remaining wolves killing Hige, Blue, and Tsume, leaving only Kiba, Cheza, and Darcia alive at the place where Paradise can be opened. Darcia and Kiba battle over who will open Paradise and Kiba is fatally wounded. Darcia dies when he attempts to enter Paradise due to not being a true wolf. Kiba finds Cheza as she dies and disintegrates into seeds. Dying, Kiba concludes that his quest has failed, but rain begins to fall and Cheza's seeds grow into thousands of lunar flowers. As he dies, Kiba falls into the water's depths but sees the blood-red moon turning back to its normal color. Cheza's death causes Paradise, as well as the world, to be reborn. However, Darcia's corruption can be seen taking root in this new Paradise. The final scenes take place in what appears to be a 21st-century Japanese city. Kiba, apparently reincarnated as a human, passes reincarnated Tsume, Hige, and Toboe (apparently no memories of past life and it is unknown if the cat with blue eyes is Blue); a lunar flower is blooming in an alleyway.

=== Changes in the manga adaptation ===
The two-volume manga adaptation includes some of the core events of the anime series with few changes, but as a whole the manga veers greatly from its anime inspiration. Many events from the anime do not occur in the manga, and some of the events from the anime that are presented in the manga are completely different in terms of dialogue, chronological sequence, and outcomes. In particular, the second volume tells an almost completely different story, with Darcia recruiting Blue to help him open the door to Paradise with her blood. The wolves must go to Darcia's keep, rather than Jaguara's, to free Cheza, with Kiba missing but appearing at the end to make the final rescue effort. At the end of the manga, the four wolves and Cheza are sitting on a rock as the clouds break and sunlight streams through for the first time. The world rejoices at the end of the Ice Age and rumors that Paradise has been found abound.

In the manga, most of the characters are similar in appearance and personality to their anime counterparts, but some characters seen in the anime do not appear in the manga, including the Noble Lord Orkham.

== Principal characters ==
Main cast of the series

- Kiba (キバ; lit. 'Fang') is a white wolf who is dedicated solely to finding the Lunar Flower and opening the way to Paradise. He does what he can as much possible to protect Cheza with his life. Kiba primarily acts on his instincts, which sometimes lead him to behave rashly, this shows the dogmatic changes through a wolf's position in a human mindset or a wolf mindset, and this causes the other characters to call him idealistic. Full of wolf pride, Kiba initially expresses disgust at wolves who use human disguises, but eventually realizes that it is necessary to survive.
  Voiced by: Mamoru Miyano (Japanese); Johnny Yong Bosch (English, Bandai Visual dub), Darren Pleavin (English, Animax Asia dub)
- Tsume (ツメ; lit. 'Claw') is a gray wolf with a large, X-shaped scar across his chest, among many others. Rough and self-reliant, Tsume is a strong fighter who keeps his true feelings to himself. He joins the others after his human gang in Freeze City betrays him. He does not initially believe in Paradise, but eventually starts to believe in their goal after seeing the great sacrifices his new pack was doing in order to open Paradise. Though he frequently quarrels with Kiba over their journey, he eventually accepts his leadership and comes to trust in him, also growing protective of Toboe and eventually forming a brotherly relationship with him.
  Voiced by: Kenta Miyake (Japanese); Crispin Freeman (English, Bandai Visual dub), Victor Lee (English, Animax Asia dub)
- Hige (ヒゲ; lit. 'Whiskers') is a brown wolf with a carefree attitude, who seems quite comfortable living in human society. Hige likes to converse with girls and to eat, and due to the latter he is quite chubby. After meeting Kiba, he goes along with the idea of searching for Paradise without much argument. Hige wears a collar around his neck, that seems to attract soldiers of a Noble, Lady Jaguara, leading him to put his wolf crew in danger and himself in pain.
  Voiced by: Akio Suyama (Japanese); Joshua Seth (English, Bandai Visual dub)
- Toboe (トオボエ, Tōboe; lit. 'Howling') is a red/brown wolf and the youngest of the group. He is considered the pup or the runt by the others, but after he desperately fights a huge walrus during the journey to rescue Cheza from Jaguara, the other wolves change their mind about him. He was raised by an old woman who found him outside the city, and still wears the bracelets she gave him. Due to his upbringing, Toboe is friendly and protective towards most humans. He forms a brotherly relationship with Tsume.
  Voiced by: Hiroki Shimowada (Japanese); Mona Marshall (English, Bandai Visual dub), Candice Moore (English, Animax Asia dub)
- Cheza (チェザ) is also called the "Flower Maiden". The wolves need Cheza to find and open the gateway to Paradise. She was created via alchemy from a Lunar Flower, and as such needs water and sunlight to survive. Originally asleep and under study in a lab in Freeze City, Cheza is eventually able to join the wolves, whom she loves, and travels with them. She refers to herself in the third person, usually adapted to "this one". The spilling of wolf blood makes Cheza scream, and she has the ability to heal them or put them to sleep through her song and touch.
  Voiced by: Arisa Ogasawara (Japanese); Sherry Lynn (English, Bandai Visual dub), Andrea Kwan (English, Animax Asia dub)
- Blue (ブルー, Burū) is a blue wolf/dog hybrid. At first, she travels along with Quent Yaiden, hunting wolves. But after Blue finds out that she is actually half-wolf, and unwilling to hunt her own kind, Blue leaves Quent to join the wolves, eventually falling in love with Hige. She is strong, fearless and independent.
  Voiced by: Mayumi Asano (Japanese); Jessica Strauss (English, Bandai Visual dub), Sarah Hauser (English, Animax Asia dub)

== Production ==
The series was created primarily by Keiko Nobumoto with director Tensai Okamura claiming he was not sure if they had a very full communication. When Nobumoto created the series, she was sort of intrigued by the two different aspects of wolves. Being noble, the dignified existence of wolves in folklore and the violent character of real wolves, and how becomes a conflicting characterization. Okamura was not sure that he understood Nobumoto's intention. The male human pursuers, Hubb and Quent, helped the director get a greater understanding of their story.

=== Release ===
The Wolf's Rain anime series was produced by studio Bones and directed by Tensai Okamura. Keiko Nobumoto was the writer and story editor, while Toshihiro Kawamoto created the character designs. The series premiered in Japan on Fuji TV on January 6, 2003, and ran for a full season of twenty-six episodes, with the final episode airing on July 29, 2003. A four-episode original video animation (OVA) was later created and released to DVD to provide a fuller conclusion to the story than the original television run did, and to make up for the four recap episodes that were originally broadcast in the middle of the series. The first two OVA episodes were released on January 23, 2004, with the final two released a month later on February 25, 2004. Animax also aired the series on its respective networks worldwide, including East Asia, Southeast Asia, South Asia, Latin America, Europe, and other regions.

Except for the four recap episodes, the entire Wolf's Rain anime series aired in the United States as part of Cartoon Network's Adult Swim lineup in 2004. It was broadcast on Europe's digital specialty station Rapture TV from November 14, 2005, to July 6, 2006. It also aired in the UK on Anime Central starting November 4, 2007, with only the first 26 episodes airing.

Wolf's Rain was licensed for Region 1 DVD release by Bandai Entertainment. The entire series, including the four OVAs, were released in seven individual volumes that contained four episodes, except for the first two volumes, which had five episodes. With the first volume, Bandai offered a stand-alone version and a limited-edition version, which included an art box, Kiba plushie, and the first CD soundtrack. Bandai also released the thirty episodes in a complete series box set and in a two-part "Anime Legends" collection. Funimation has since licensed the series following the closure of Bandai Entertainment and released the series on a Blu-ray and DVD combo pack on February 7, 2017.

In Region 2 (Europe) the series is licensed by Beez Entertainment, which also released the entire series, including the OVAs, in seven individual volumes, and later as a box set which also included the first soundtrack CD (see below). In Region 4, Madman Entertainment owns the series license and released all twenty-six episodes and four OVA episodes in the form of a complete series box set.

=== Soundtrack ===
All of the music for the Wolf's Rain soundtrack was composed and arranged by Yoko Kanno. The vocal songs are performed by various artists, including Maaya Sakamoto, Raj Ramayya, Ilaria Graziano, Steve Conte and Joyce, and they were recorded around the world, including Japan, Poland, Brazil, the United States, and Italy to offer a diverse range of music and give the soundtrack an international flavor. Two CD soundtracks, produced by Yoko Kanno, Toshiaki Ota, and Shiro Sasaki, were released in Japan by Victor Entertainment.

"Gravity", the series' ending theme, is a song performed by Maaya Sakamoto. It was released as a single on February 21, 2003.

Wolf's Rain Original Soundtrack, Volume 1 was released March 29, 2003. It contains twenty-one tracks, including the opening and closing themes throughout most of the main series "Stray" and "Gravity" and many of the background sounds used during key points in the main series. The soundtrack was released in the United States by Bandai Entertainment on May 11, 2004, under the title of Wolf's Rain Original Soundtrack.

Wolf's Rain Original Soundtrack, Volume 2 was released on January 21, 2004. It contains an additional 23 tracks, including the closing theme for the final episode of the main series "Tell Me What the Rain Knows", sung by Maaya Sakamoto and with lyrics by Chris Mosdell. It also includes background music from the final episode not included in the broadcast version, and music from the four OVA episodes. The second CD has not been licensed for release outside Japan.

== Manga ==
The two-volume manga series was originally serialized in Magazine Z, a monthly seinen magazine, with the first chapter premiering in April 2003. The manga, which was written by Nobumoto and illustrated by Toshitsugu Iida, is an almost complete retelling of the anime story. Each chapter of the manga series is called a "grope", which is a reference to a Japanese phrase for arriving somewhere after enduring hardships.

The two volumes were released in North America by VIZ Media as individual volumes in 2004 and 2005. An exclusive edition of the first volume was released on November 5, 2004, in Borders and Waldenbooks stores that included a collectible box to hold both volumes and a 3D lenticular card. The Viz English release is adapted by David Ury, who also acted as translator and Egan Loo. The series has also been released in German by Heyne, in Italian by Shin Vision and in Polish by Japonica Polonica Fantastica.

No.	Original release date	Original ISBN	English release date	English ISBN
1	July 23, 2003	978-4-06-349139-5	May 3, 2005	1-59116-591-1
Grope 1. A Short Story; Grope 2. The Key to Paradise; Grope 3. Escape From the Fortress; Grope 4. The Fortress of Solitude; Grope 5. The Flower That Dances in the Wind
Kiba, a wounded white wolf, goes to a city in search of the Lunar Flower that can open the door to Paradise. There he meets Tsume, Hige, and Toboe, three other wolves using illusions to appear as humans so they can live in relative safety in the city. All four soon find themselves the target of Quent Yaiden and his dog Blue, who seek to kill every remaining wolf in the world. Cheza, the Lunar Flower, awakens at Kiba's arrival, but she is stolen away by Darcia. The four wolves join together and leave the town. After a rough trip through a town that violently rejects all outsiders, the wolves are able to meet with Cheza, who sensed their presence below and jumped from Darcia's airship to float down to them.
2	February 23, 2004	978-4-06-349161-6	June 14, 2005	1-59116-718-3
Grope 6. The Spellbound Pack; Grope 7. A Sad Song; Grope 8. The Grave That Looks Towards Heaven; Grope 9. The Pedigree of the Guides; Grope 10. The Depths of Despair; Grope 11. Rain
The four wolves fight a large pack of wolves that went crazy after seeing Cheza, but Cheza realizing her wolves were losing, sang the crazed wolves to sleep. Her song also affects Blue, who realizes for the first time that she has wolf blood in her. Darcia recaptures Cheza, badly wounding the four wolves in the process. Darcia aims to open Paradise using Cheza and the blood of Blue, whom he found in the woods and recruited for the project. After a fight with Darcia that leaves Kiba completely blind, the wolves are able to free Cheza and escape Darcia's keep just before it collapses. At the end, as the wolves and Cheza sit on a rock, the sun breaks through the clouds for the first time and the Ice Age ends, leading people to believe that Paradise has opened.

== Reception ==
In Japan, Wolf's Rain ranked third among anime series airing in the same time slot behind Air Master and Dear Boys. The series was considered "a big hit in 2004" for the North American market, selling well in mass markets as well as in online markets and at independent retailers. ICv2 notes that it has "a strong appeal to the growing teen and older anime audience." The series was selected as one of the top ten anime properties of 2005 for the ICv2 Retailers Guide to Anime/Manga. Its release was also a central reason Bandai Entertainment earned the ICv2 Anime Company of the Year award for 2004.

Tasha Robinson of SciFi Weekly praised the series for its unusual focus on non-human characters and the interesting dynamic of wolves behaving like wolves as they interact with the human characters and environments in the series. Carlo Santos of Anime News Network praised the visuals of the series, noting that they "showcase Studio BONES at their most imaginative, with beautiful backgrounds that depict settings from high-tech mysticism to urban decay to open wilderness. The character designs are equally striking: in their human form, the wolves wear contemporary outfits, making them the most accessible of all characters." Both Santos and Chris Beveridge of Mania.com noted that the Region 1 DVD volume containing the four recapitulation episodes should be left unbought and skipped as a waste of money; however, they praised Bandai's release of the episodes for putting the episodes on a single volume, unlike in the Japanese release where they were spread over two DVDs requiring them to be bought to get the new episodes on the same volumes. Other critics have complained that while the show had an original and innovative storyline with beautiful visuals and appealing characters, the episodes themselves were poorly paced, undeveloped, and plagued with plot holes.

In The Anime Encyclopedia, Jonathan Clements and Helen McCarthy criticized the production delays and the hiatuses that led to the creation of the four recap episodes, stating that "if the makers had spent less time recounting the story so far, they might have had more than enough space to finish the entire run within the requisite 26 episodes". They praised the series' soundtrack, feeling it supported "the atmosphere and character development", and felt the "moody, dark, and understated" art was attractive.

Yoko Kanno's soundtrack for the series has also been hailed for its beauty and the way it adds to the series' emotional impact. The instrumental tracks were found to mirror the show's tone perfectly, evoking feelings of sorrow and loss. According to one reviewer, the soundtrack "...shows [Kanno's] skills as both composer and pianist..." and is "...a treat to hear." Kanno's work in the series was nominated for an Annie Award in the "Music in an Animated Television Production" category in 2006.

The Wolf's Rain manga adaptation has also enjoyed success in the North American market, with the second volume being the ninth best-selling graphic novel on the Nielsen BookScan list for February 13, 2007. It was considered a "major manga hit" among manga series adapted from an anime series. Anime News Network's Liann Cooper praised its artwork, but also felt its short length and rushed storyline made it hard to connect to the characters. He also felt the supporting characters, Cher, Hubb and Quent, were only included "just to have them included". Carlo Santos, also of Anime News Network, praised the "snappy pacing" while also considering it the primary downfall of the series. In reviewing the series for Manga: The Complete Guide, Rebecca Brown felt the series was a "transparent grab for cash" and criticized its extreme brevity and the art, which she felt was "barely adequate and at times not even that."
