= Indira =

Indira may refer to:

== People ==
- Indira (name), an Indian female given name
  - Indira Gandhi (1917–1984), Indian politician, prime minister 1966–1977, 1980–1984
  - Indira Billi or Indira (1936–2025), Indian actress

== Arts and entertainment ==
- Indira, an 1873 novella by Bankim Chandra Chatterjee
  - Indira (1929 film), a silent Indian film based on the novella, starring Durgadas Bannerjee and B. S. Rajhans
  - Indira (1937 film), Bengali film directed by Tarit Bose based on the novella
  - Indira (1983 film), Bengali film directed by Dinen Gupta based on novel of Bankim Chandra Chatterjee
- Indira (1995 film), a 1995 Indian Tamil-language film directed by Suhasini Manirathnam
- Indira (TV series), a 2022–2024 Indian Tamil-language drama series
- Indira "Indu", a fictional character portrayed by Kajal Aggarwal in the 2009 Indian film Magadheera

== Others ==
- Indira is a byname of Lakshmi, the Hindu goddess of prosperity, good luck, and beauty
- Indira Col, a col in the Karakoram mountains, northernmost tip of India
- Indira Marathon, a national annual full marathon held in Allahabad, India
- Indira Mount, an Indian seabed mountain situated in Antarctic Ocean
- Indira Point, southernmost tip of India in the Andaman and Nicobar Islands

== See also ==
- Indu (disambiguation), a hypochorism of the Indian feminine given name
- Indra (disambiguation)
- Indira Nagar (disambiguation)
- Indira Gandhi ministry (disambiguation)
