= List of The Fruit of Grisaia episodes =

The Fruit of Grisaia is a 13-episode anime television series based on the visual novel of the same name by Front Wing. It is animated by Eight Bit, produced by NBCUniversal, and directed by Tenshi, with screenplay by Hideyuki Kurata, character designs and chief animation direction by Akio Watanabe, and music composed by Elements Garden. The series aired from October 5 to December 28, 2014, on AT-X. Six anime shorts were released with the DVD and Blu-ray Disc compilation volumes released between December 25, 2014, and May 27, 2015. Sequentially, two follow-ups with a 47-minute anime television film adaptation of The Labyrinth of Grisaia aired on April 12, 2015, and a 10-episode anime adaptation of The Eden of Grisaia aired from April 19 to June 21, 2015. All 3 series have been licensed for digital and home video release by Sentai Filmworks in North America.

The opening theme song is "Rakuen no Tsubasa" (楽園の翼; "Wing of Paradise"), performed by Maon Kurosaki, and the main ending theme song is "Anata no Aishita Sekai" (あなたの愛した世界; "The World That You Loved"), performed by Yoshino Nanjō. Additional ending theme songs include "Eden's Song" by Hana used in Episode 2; "Skip" used in Episode 5; and "Sōsei no Tanatosu" (創世のタナトス; "Thanatos of the Genesis"), performed by Faylan, used in Episode 13. Several ending themes from the game included as insert songs are also used in the anime such as "Holograph" in Episode 6, and "Lost Forest" in Episode 9. The opening theme song for The Eden of Grisaia is "Setsuna no Kajitsu" (刹那の果実), performed by Maon Kurosaki.

A 90-minute anime film adaptation based on Frontwing's Grisaia: Phantom Trigger episodic game series premiered on March 15, 2019. The film, which adapts the first 2 volumes of the game, was directed by Tensho at Bibury Animation Studios, with Akio Watanabe handling character designs and Ryuichiro Yamakawa handling production. Hitoshi Fujima and Fuminori Matsumoto are composing the music. The cast members reprised their roles from the game. Sequentially, a sequel to Grisaia: Phantom Trigger premiered on November 27, 2020. Titled Grisaia: Phantom Trigger the Animation - Stargazer, it adapts Volume 3 of the game, with the cast and staff reprising their roles from the first film.

A new anime television series adaptation based on Grisaia: Phantom Trigger was announced, with Bibury Animation Studios returning from the game's film adaptations to produce the series. It is directed by Kousuke Murayama, with character designs and chief animation direction by Akio Watanabe, and music composed by Hitoshi Fujima, Yūsuke Takeda, and Fuminori Matsumoto. The series, originally scheduled for 2024, was later delayed, and eventually aired from January 2 to March 27, 2025, on Tokyo MX and other networks. (Note: Tokyo MX lists the series premiere on January 1, 2025, at 25:00, which is effectively January 2 at 1:00 a.m. JST.) Crunchyroll streams the series. The opening theme song is "Zero Ignition", performed by Mao Uesugi, while the ending theme song is "Dandelion", performed by Yoshino Nanjō.

== Episode list ==
=== The Fruit of Grisaia ===
| No. | Title (Note: All English titles are taken from HIDIVE.) | Original air date |
|---|---|---|
| 1 | "Ordinary Academy Life"; Transliteration: "Futsū no Gakuen Seikatsu" (Japanese: 普通の学園生活) | October 5, 2014 |
A young man, Yūji Kazami, is being detained by the police. On being released, the principal of Mihama Academy, Chizuru Tachibana, picks him up and drives him to the school where he is shown to his room in the dormitory. On entering the dorm he is introduced to a fellow student, Sachi Komine, who is wearing a maid uniform. The following morning he meets two more students, Amane Suou and Makina Irisu, in the lobby and later meets another student, Michiru Matsushima, in their classroom where she is practicing her "tsundere speech". Once the class begins he finds out that there is one more student in their class who is absent. Makina informs him that the absent student, Yumiko Sakaki, only comes in the evenings. When he comes to the classroom later that day to introduce himself, Yumiko tries to slash him with a box cutter. On returning to the dorm, he finds Amane changing clothes in his room and, during their discussion, he tells her that he had an older sister named Kazuki whose name she seems to recognize. Later, Yūji receives a phone call from J.B. who tells him that he has a job to do. The images during the end credits give hints of why all of the girls except for Yumiko are enrolled in the school - as well as Yūji himself.
| 2 | "School Killer Yumiko"; Transliteration: "Sukūru Kirā Yumiko" (Japanese: スクールキラー由美子) | October 12, 2014 |
Yumiko Sakaki makes continued attempts to cut Yūji but to her frustration he avoids them all. Later that day he encounters Makina, who is quite shy, but after he helps her catch a crayfish she warms up to him and decides to call him Onii-chan. He then visits the principal's office for advice in resolving Sakaki's continued hostility towards him. He finds out that all of the other students have 'special circumstances' for enrolling in the school. Yūji's guardian and work boss, J.B., comes to pay him a visit at school which stirs his classmates' curiosity - especially Amane, who wants to know whether or not Yūji has a girlfriend. Later that evening in the dorm, he is ambushed by Yumiko once again but is nearly taken by surprise, reflexively responding by knocking the knife from her hand and intimidating her with the display. He then tells her that he is not her enemy and intends to be her friend. From that day onwards, Yumiko attitude towards him softens. The end credit montage shows how each of the other students arrived at the Academy and how they became friends.
| 3 | "Sweet Diet"; Transliteration: "Amai Shokuseikatsu" (Japanese: 甘い食生活) | October 19, 2014 |
Returning to the dorm after his morning jog, Yūji sees Amane picking the lock to his room and immediately suspects that she may be an assassin. He listens and watches from the doorway as, to his considerable surprise, all she wanted to do is surprise him with a wake-up kiss. She then proceeds to jump onto his bed and masturbate after smelling his worn clothes. Yūji then makes his presence known to Amane's considerable embarrassment. While rushing to class later that morning he makes up a song for Makina in which he teases Amane for her earlier actions. At lunch, Amane expresses her concern that Makina is starting to imitate Yūji's mannerisms. That afternoon Yūji overhears an erotic voice and discovers that it is Michiru, who is playing with a kitten. The following day, he inadvertently agrees to have Sachi make him a shark pouch (like Michiru's) only with glitter, though some quick thinking on Michiru's part allows him to foist the pouch on Makina. That afternoon during gym, Amane hurts her ankle and Yūji carries her to the infirmary. After he treats her injury, Amane requests that Yūji be her boyfriend. When he refuses, she changes her request to be regarded as his older sister, which he agrees to. The next day, Amane and Makina share their lunch with Yūji and he realizes that he has been avoiding people since his "master"'s death.
| 4 | "Where to Aim the Silver Bullet"; Transliteration: "Gin no Dangan de Nerau Basho" (Japanese: 銀の弾丸で狙う場所) | October 26, 2014 |
During his morning jog, Yūji sees Michiru sitting on the grass with a cat on her lap staring at the sea and strikes up a conversion with her. The following evening the residents of the dorm discuss Michiru's recent odd behaviour. Later that night, Sachi, Yumiko and Yūji witness Michiru as she stumbles out of the dorm having gotten hair dye in her eyes and dripping it all over the floor. The next day Amane asks Yūji and Yumiko if friendship between men and women is possible. When Michiru appears, she is also asked the same question and runs off after answering. Yūji goes after her and confronts her, stating that she is different from the Michiru he once knew. The new personality converses with Yūji then kisses him and reverts to the original personality. The next morning Michiru asks Yūji to demonstrate what her other self had done to him the previous day and freaks out when he almost kisses her. She runs off to calm herself down and chases her cat away. Yūji finds her on the bluff looking for the cat which she has named Meowmel (Nyanmel). As they walk home together Yūji notices something and tells her to go on without him. Ignoring his words, Michiru comes up and finds that Meowmel has been run over and is dying. Yūji hails a cab but they are too late and Meowmel dies in Michiru's lap.
| 5 | "Vox in Box" | November 2, 2014 |
Michiru is devastated by Meowmel's death and has taken a number of pills. Yūji takes her to the infirmary where she recovers. Sachi gives him a locked box which she received from Michiru. He opens it and finds an exchange diary that Michiru kept with her other self. When Yūji confronts her with it, he learns that Michiru developed the other personality after receiving a heart transplant and that her original personality has hidden itself away and does not want to return. Yūji forces Michiru's original personality out, and she says that she wants to die. Yūji agrees to help her and he takes her to the bluff overlooking the ocean where she played with Meowmel and buries her alive in a coffin. Trapped in the darkness, Michiru starts to hallucinate and we see her past in a flashback. In middle school, Michiru became depressed because she was always being told she was a failure and intended to kill herself. On the roof of the school, she met another suicidal girl, and the two became close friends. However, the girl later killed herself in front of Michiru, which caused Michiru's weak heart to give way and led to her heart transplant. Michiru later discovered that the heart she received maintained its owner's original personality, with whom she was able communicate. Back in the coffin, Michiru comes to the realization that she does not want to die anymore and she pushes her way out of the coffin. Yūji, who has waited three days for her to emerge, helps Michiru to the surface and he carries her back to the dorm. Yūji later takes the alternate Michiru to see her parents, and, although she appears less often, she still resides in Michiru.
| 6 | "Raison D'être"; Transliteration: "Rēzon Dētoru" (Japanese: レーゾン・デートル) | November 9, 2014 |
In junior high school, Yumiko slashes the hand of a girl gossiping how she was the daughter of a mistress and was brought into her father's household only after her younger brother and family heir died. Yumiko's father wants her to assume her place as the heir to the Tohin Railway Group, and Yūji is ordered to act as Yumiko's bodyguard and then allow Yumiko to be abducted so as to scare her into returning home. However, Yūji decides to disobey orders and protects Yumiko. As they wait out a rain storm under a bridge, Yumiko reveals her past to Yūji. Angered by Yūji's defiance of his orders, Yumiko's father plans to have Yumiko study in America and orders the shut down of the school. Yumiko refuses to leave, prompting her father to come to the school to appeal to her in person. To his surprise, she opens fire on him with a gun and precipitates a standoff. When his men charge the building after her ammunition runs out she pulls the pin on a grenade and seemingly kills herself. However, Yūji had helped Yumiko fake her death. Yumiko is given a new identity including a falsified family registry and starts a new life as another student at the school.
| 7 | "Letter of Happiness"; Transliteration: "Shiawase no Tegami" (Japanese: 幸せの手紙) | November 16, 2014 |
Sachi passes out in the bath after taking something Makina said too literally. The next day, Michiru facetiously asks Sachi to make the upcoming test go away. Sachi locks herself in her room and starts preparing to blow up the school using time bombs. The night before the test, her classmates show up just after she starts the timers. Sachi tries to get them to leave to no avail, but as Sachi throws herself on the explosives, they fail to detonate. Yūji shows up and has everyone except Sachi head back to the dorm. He tells her he tampered with the timers, and calls her Sacchan, revealing that he has remembered her. As a child, Sachi was lonely due to her parents too busy running their business. Sachi had met Yūji at the playground and the two of them played together until he moved away. On Sachi's tenth birthday, her parents get in a traffic accident after Sachi ran away due to the previous months of neglect. Her father is killed and her mother has been in a coma ever since. Sachi reveals that she believes that her parents were in the accident because she was selfish and that she has to be a good girl who does what she is told to make up for it. Yūji refutes her by saying that the selfish whims she subjected him to when they played together helped him forget his own troubles at the time. To repay that debt, he covers up the disposal of her bombs with a fireworks display and that weekend, he takes her to visit her parents' shop where they find a birthday display and letter. The day ends with Sachi visiting her mother in the hospital and then asking Yūji for a hug.
| 8 | "The Seed of the World Tree I"; Transliteration: "Sekaiju no Tane Ichi" (Japanese: セカイ樹の種I) | November 23, 2014 |
Makina sends Yūji an email stating that he has now graduated from Onii-chan status to Papa status. When a confused Yūji confronts her, Makina presents Yūji with a check for 70 million yen, the entirety of her inheritance, so that he will act as her father. Reluctantly, he agrees and proceeds to keep a close eye on her, to the envy of the other girls, especially Amane, who states that if Yūji is her father, then she could just as easily be her mother. During a break from school, Yūji takes Makina to his home in the mountains where he used to live with his master. Later, by chance, Makina encounters her younger sister and Irisu heir, Sarina, in town, but passes by without saying anything to her. To her horror, her sister's car explodes moments later. The shaken Makina is tended by her classmates and when she wakes up Yūji informs her that her sister was taken to hospital and is expected to survive. That evening, Yūji is called in to work where JB presents him with a dossier for his next job - and the target is Makina.
| 9 | "The Seed of the World Tree II"; Transliteration: "Sekaiju no Tane Ni" (Japanese: セカイ樹の種II) | November 30, 2014 |
Yūji takes the job JB gave him but only so that he can protect her. To do so, he and Makina leave the Academy so as to present a moving target and Sachi gives Makina an apple sapling as a parting gift. The efforts of the organization to get hold of Makina are fruitless as Yūji is able to dispose of every agent sent after them. As they flee, Yūji becomes aware of Makina's recurrent nightmares involving her father. It is revealed that a few years earlier Makina's father found evidence of the Irisu Group's corruption and was killed in front of Makina on his wife's orders. Makina spent a number of years in a hospital recovering from the trauma. It is further revealed that she has a near photographic memory and had read some of the incriminating documents before her father's death. It turns out that Makina's mother ordered the hit on Makina because she phoned her mother and threatened to reveal the corruption unless her younger sister was kept safe. When their latest hideout is compromised, Yūji manages to get them away but Makina forgets her sapling. Despite Yūji's admonition to forget about it, Makina returns to the hotel to search for it and is shot. Yūji shows up in time to take her to a hospital but is intercepted by JB. In the hospital, Makina's mother shows up and, to JB's horror and disgust, asks if Makina's internal organs are unharmed because Sarina is in need of an organ transplant. Later, a disguised Yūji shows up at the Irisu Group's HQ and shoots Makina's mother. With the contractor for the hit out of the picture, and with hard evidence of the Irisu Group's corruption in the hands of the organization, Yūji and a recovering Makina return to the Academy.
| 10 | "Angelic Howl I"; Transliteration: "Enjerikku Hauru Ichi" (Japanese: エンジェリック・ハウルI) | December 7, 2014 |
JB drops Yūji off at the Academy after a job but before he can exit the car she kisses him on the cheek, much to his discomfort. To complicate matters, he finds that Sachi has witnessed the kiss but promises not to say anything. Yūji returns to his room to find Amane waiting for him. Following their usual banter and a shower, Yūji sits down to dinner when Amane receives a picture of JB kissing him (Sachi took 'saying' literally), which arouses her jealousy. Yūji asks Amane why she is so persistent in pursuing him to which she responds it was love at first sight. He is not satisfied with her answer and presses her. She breaks down and to Yūji's shock mentions his sister's name. She reveals that she and Yūji's sister, Kazuki, were both freshmen on the same basketball team in middle school. As they talk further Yūji finally agrees to allow her to act as his girlfriend provided that he does not have to act as her boyfriend. Amane then retrieves a journal from her room and gives it to Yūji to read. The journal documents the tragic events that befell the basketball team as Amane, the sole survivor, remembers them.
| 11 | "Angelic Howl II"; Transliteration: "Enjerikku Hauru Ni" (Japanese: エンジェリック・ハウルII) | December 14, 2014 |
The survivors of the crash continue to make do as Kazuki continues to care for the wounded. As the days pass, they bury their dead and continue to gather what little food they can find. Their teacher, having scouted around, takes half of the food and leaves, promising that he will return with help. Despair sets in when he does not return after a couple of days. Malnourished, some of the girls start acting strangely. Finally, the pet dog of one of the girls perishes and is butchered to provide the survivors with sustenance.
| 12 | "Angelic Howl III"; Transliteration: "Enjerikku Hauru San" (Japanese: エンジェリック・ハウルIII) | December 21, 2014 |
Two weeks pass and no rescue is in sight and the injured and malnourished girls start dying one by one. When their teacher returns without help, all remaining hope is lost. When sensei claims to have hunted down a deer, Kazuki is suspicious and decides to set out with Amane in tow. She shows Amane that the 'venison' that the others ate was in fact something else and that the remaining survivors have gone mad and are active participants or do not care. When the others close in on the fleeing pair, Kazuki stays behind as a decoy to let Amane escape. At first hailed as a miracle survivor, Amane soon faces questions as to why she was the only one who survived. Suffering from nightmares, the relentless public pressure convinces her that she must be punished for living when everyone else died and that Yūji is the person with the greatest right to punish her. She even asks Yūji to kill her. Yūji instead asks her to live for his sake as her punishment in the hope that since he has accepted her, even knowing her past, she will come to forgive herself.
| 13 | "10 Centimeter Field of Fire"; Transliteration: "Shakai Jussenchi" (Japanese: 射界10センチ) | December 28, 2014 |
Yūji accompanies Amane to the site of the accident so that she can finally put the incident to rest. On the way, Yūji is stopped by a man who claims to be Amane's greatest fan. After she pays her respects to her dead friends, Amane leads Yūji to a location on the map that Kazuki gave her where they find a note hinting that Kazuki is still alive. Meanwhile, the man who accosted Yūji has entered the Academy and taken the other girls hostage and demands Amane's presence. When they return home, Amane prepares to give herself up and Yūji, having been able to listen to the goings-on in the school via cell phone, comes up with a plan to end the standoff. The hostage taker is revealed to be the father of Chiaki Sakashita who has not been able to deal with the death of his daughter and wants to kill Amane for surviving. Having decided that shooting Amane would be too easy a death, Sakashita removes her to the washroom to have his way with her. Yūji is able to snipe Sakashita through a 10 cm wide field of view from over 900 m away, ending the hostage situation and reuniting him with the girls. Following a time skip of one year, an unidentified boat enters Japanese waters. One of two passengers fires a rocket at the Coast Guard cutter and helicopter. The other opens a music box.

=== The Labyrinth of Grisaia ===
| No. | Title | Original air date |
|---|---|---|
| 1 | "The Cocoon of Caprice 0"; Transliteration: "Kapurisu no Mayu Rei" (Japanese: カプリスの繭 0) | April 12, 2015 |
At the Vancouver airport, a hijacker, who has taken a Japanese woman hostage, is sniped by Yūji from 2 km away. Yūji completes the mission successfully, saving the hostage, Chizuru. Two years later, Yūji is invited to his boss, JB's office, to talk about his childhood and upbringing. He tells her about a painful experience in his past involving his sister, Kazuki. Among her many talents, Kazuki was a gifted artist and selling her paintings soon became the main source of household finances. As a result, she also became the dominant person in the family. Kazuki is shown to have had a borderline incestuous love for her brother. Kazuki's death had a profound effect on the rest of the family. Having lost his primary source of income, their father became an alcoholic and abusive. Yūji and his mother fled, but about a year later Yūji's father found them and raped his wife in front of Yūji. To protect his mother, Yūji hit his father over the head with a bottle, killing him. His mother handed him her bank book and told Yūji to wait for her at the station. Sensing something was wrong, Yūji returned home and found that his mother had hanged herself. Yūji was taken in by one of the men who bought his sister's paintings. Yūji was forced to wear dresses and a silver wig, in which he looked remarkably like his sister and he would molest him. One day, one of his guardian's men tried to assault Yūji, who killed him in self-defense. Rather than being angry, his guardian seemed pleased and sent Yūji to a school where he and other children were taught various skills related to terrorism and assassination. Yūji's aptitude for this vocation earned him the antipathy of his fellow students, who regularly beat him. When the time for his graduation came, Yūji was pitted in a battle to the death against Marlin, the only student to show him kindness, but he was unable to bring himself to kill her. She later graduated but was killed on her first mission. When Yūji finally graduated, he became a skilled assassin who drew the attention of the organization. A team from the organization led by Asako Kusakabe stormed the assassin school and fought their way through to the basement where they found Yūji cuffed to a bed. In the confusion, his guardian managed to get away. Back at the dormitory, Sachi reveals to the other girls that she has found and reconstructed shredded documents from Yūji's room. Together, the five of them decide to read them.

=== The Eden of Grisaia ===
| No. | Title | Original air date |
|---|---|---|
| 1 | "The Cocoon of Caprice I"; Transliteration: "Kapurisu no Mayu Ichi" (Japanese: カプリスの繭I) | April 19, 2015 |
The girls at the dormitory find themselves with a lot of guilt about learning Yūji's past, but continue to read regardless. The flashback starts with Yūji in the hospital and being visited by Asako Kusakabe and her friend JB where Asako declares that she will be his god from that point on and takes him with her to her home. Here they find all the scars from his previous wounds. At dinner Yūji accidentally kills a fly and shows signs of trauma from killing people. Shortly after, Asako is seen trying to feed Yūji but he declared that her cooking is too horrible to be considered edible. Asako gifts Yūji a dog which Yūji names John and they become constant companions. Asako trains Yūji in all sorts of things in which he takes a liking to sharpshooting. At a later date while Asako is away, the house is attacked by a bear which kills Yūji's dog. Yūji chases after the bear to save his dog but is not able to pull the trigger, specially after seeing it was just feeding its cubs. When Asako arrives he tells her that he was completely useless but Asako consoles him by saying that he is fine just the way he is. Later that day when they bury John Asako tells Yūji that he is not allowed to die unless he saves 5 people and tells him that he should become someone who can pull the trigger for others rather than himself.
| 2 | "The Cocoon of Caprice II"; Transliteration: "Kapurisu no Mayu Ni" (Japanese: カプリスの繭II) | April 26, 2015 |
Asako tells JB that Yūji is no longer a virgin and that they have been doing it many times since his birthday. Asako convinces JB to also sleep with Yūji and prevents her from backing down. Sometime later, when Asako's health begins to deteriorate for an unknown reason, Yūji ends up taking her place at some missions, which greatly upsets JB when she finds out. Eventually Yūji decides to also work for the same organization as Asako, and JB eventually agrees. Yūji and Asako travel to America and Yūji is enrolled at a military academy, where he befriends the slightly older Daniel Born. Yūji ends up constantly helping Danny with his training. When Yūji wins the first place in marksmanship, he is challenged by second place winner Milliela Stanfield to a shooting contest. When Yūji makes a shot thats impossible to Millie, she falls in love with Kazami and starts following him everywhere. Yūji, Danny and Millie are eventually assigned to the same platoon.
| 3 | "The Cocoon of Caprice III"; Transliteration: "Kapurisu no Mayu San" (Japanese: カプリスの繭III) | May 3, 2015 |
The episode starts with Danny's funeral with Yūji, Millie, and Danny's family present. According to Yūji, he had died in an accident. Flashback to their days in the army, Yūji and his group meet with their platoon's new member, Robert "Immortal Robbie" Wallson. Yūji learns that the "Immortal" is mistakenly taken from the Japanese word "Imouto" which means "little sister" as Robbie is known for being an otaku who plays erotic games featuring little sisters. Their platoon is dispatched in a jungle where Yūji gives a brief summary of his companions' past. Daniel "Danny" Born is a former car thief from Arizona, Milliela "Millie" Stanfield was an impoverished prostitute, Robbert Wallson is an otaku who only loves two dimensional women and Yūji who describes himself as a sniper unable to kill. They are introduced to another new platoon member, Edward Walker, who Yūji coached in shooting practice before and their platoon leader Justin "J" Mikemeyer, a military physician. After a somewhat awkward speech, Justin renames their platoon into the Bush Dog Platoon. During one of their night missions, their platoon engages with an enemy group during which Yūji forces himself to snipe and kill 9 people after some words of encouragement from his friends but he becomes sick and vomits after each kill. Despite this, his efforts saved their platoon. Eventually, he overcomes this weakness and becomes accustomed to killing in battle. After his platoon's duties have ended Yūji returns to Japan. Millie and Danny see him leave and it is revealed that Millie confessed her love to Yūji only to be rejected, yet she continues to hope and pray for his good fortune. Yūji reunites with Asako in their old mountain home and decides to give his life to her but she quietly replies that she does not need it.
| 4 | "The Cocoon of Caprice IV"; Transliteration: "Kapurisu no Mayu Yon" (Japanese: カプリスの繭IV) | May 10, 2015 |
Asako's health is quickly deteriorating. Meanwhile, Yūji is assigned to various missions by JB after he officially inherits Asako's old codename in CIRS, 9029. While on a guard duty mission in Colombia, Yūji receives a call from JB informing him that Asako has collapsed causing him to rush home. Yūji reveals that Asako suffers from a kind of venous thrombosis and that the original cause was a capillary rupture that happened after Asako took a shot from a high-caliber rifle. While such a condition would normally be survivable, Asako, despite her periodic treatment, regularly used booster drugs which made her body fragile. The doctors concluded that there was nothing they could do for her. Now on her death bed, Asako welcomes Yūji home and he tries to will her into living and eventually breaks down in tears. Asako tells Yūji to live for his own sake as he is now capable of accomplishing anything. Asako and Yūji briefly reminisce about a brief moment in his past which he has forgotten. Asako then falls asleep and passes away peacefully. Grieving over the death of her best friend, JB recalls when they first met in an orphanage as children. She then invites Yūji to live with her in her luxurious apartment which he does. Eventually, Yūji decides to go on a soul searching trip which he and Asako originally planned on years ago albeit in a different location. After returning home, he visits the grave he made for Asako near their old home where he decides to "do his youth over" and enroll in a "normal school" which resulted in his transfer to Mihama Academy and his current situation. As Yūji finishes his life story narration, JB's assistant, Chiara Farrell, enters the room which prompts Yūji to leave and return to the academy but as he leaves, he is given a mission to assassinate someone called Ethan Glow who is quickly revealed to be Heath Oslo, the terrorist who took Yūji in as a child after his mother died. This sudden realization causes Yūji to lose his composure and fail his mission. He is then forcefully taken away by an unknown group. Back at Mihama Academy, the girls are shocked to see Yūji on the news and his alleged participation in a terrorist attack conducted by Oslo.
| 5 | "The Seed of Blanc Aile I"; Transliteration: "Buran'ēru no Tane Ichi" (Japanese: ブランエールの種I) | May 17, 2015 |
The girls question Chizuru about what happened to Yūji but all she tells them is a message left by Yūji himself telling them not to look for him or to get too deeply involved if he suddenly disappears as this is how his "company" works. Chizuru gives a brief explanation of Yūji's relationship with Heath Oslo causing Yumiko to hypothesize that the government may be using Yūji to bargain with Oslo as he considers Yūji to be important. Chizuru warns them not to do anything that might worsen Yūji's situation. She also announces that Mihama Academy will be closing soon due to Yumiko's father, the school's main sponsor, losing his position and because Makina's family has stopped giving contributions to the school. Later that night, the girls enter Yūji's room and find diary-like entries about the girls written all over his walls and floor including one that appears to be a suicide note. JB suddenly calls them and confirms that the news of Yūji being a terrorist is false but he is still under suspicion and is being kept in a holding facility. The girls then gather information about Yūji and Heath Oslo using Yumiko's information network and learn that Oslo had smuggled a weapon of mass destruction into Japan. Yumiko herself confirms this when she meets one of her connections who is none other than Robert Wallson, Yūji's old friend and comrade in the army. Robbie, now known as James Okada, is a former intelligence operative and has opened his own soba restaurant after retiring. James reveals Yūji's location and gives Yumiko a detailed explanation about the Thanatos System, a semi-organic computer capable of hacking into every electronic and/or internet-capable device and can be considered the "brain" of the nation itself. James explains that acquiring the Thanatos System is Oslo's true goal and since the government cannot hand it over, they turned Yūji into a bargaining chip after Oslo attacked the consulate. Meanwhile, the other girls were reflecting on their future plans. The next day, Mihama Academy officially closes and all the girls, except Michiru, meet at the school's entrance where they resolve to help Yūji even if it means that they can never return to their old lives. After Sachi gives a farewell speech to the school, the girls prepare to leave but Michiru barely arrives after finally sorting out her feelings and all 5 of them leave Mihama Academy together. Back in the holding facility, Yūji is introduced to the Thanatos System itself which uses a hologram to project the image and voice of his supposedly deceased sister, Kazuki Kazami.
| 6 | "The Seed of Blanc Aile II"; Transliteration: "Buran'ēru no Tane Ni" (Japanese: ブランエールの種II) | May 24, 2015 |
After riding on a train, the girls arrive at their new home, a boathouse owned by Yumiko who believes it best to be able to move around, hideout and all, should the need arise. In the holding facility, Yūji confirms that the hologram is indeed Kazuki after she answers his question. She then reveals that Oslo had smuggled a new kind of nuclear bomb that can cover a radius of 50 kilometers should it explode. She also explains why Yūji is valuable to Oslo; Yuji is the only survivor of a human experiment to create the ultimate soldiers through various experiments, drug administration, and testing. However, the booster drugs used on the test subjects produced adverse side effects which resulted in the test subjects' deaths within 2 years but Yūji survived thus making him a valuable project sample. Meanwhile, Michiru finds a cellphone in her bag which then rings and Kazuki's voice is heard despite the number belonging to Yūji's phone. She introduces herself as Thanatos and offers the girls her assistance to rescue Yūji in order to disrupt Oslo's plans. Despite their doubts, they decide to cooperate with her not knowing who she really is though Amane finds the voice familiar but cannot remember properly. The next day, Kazuki provides each of them with special cellphones in order to contact each other without being traced. Before explaining her plan, she convinces Yumiko to admit her feelings for Yūji in order to test her resolve. Back at the Thanatos System's holding facility, Kazuki reveals the truth of what happened to her during the bus accident years ago after Amane had escaped while she was left behind.
| 7 | "The Seed of Blanc Aile III"; Transliteration: "Buran'ēru no Tane San" (Japanese: ブランエールの種III) | May 31, 2015 |
JB explains to her assistant, Chiara Farrell, that she has been confined due to her being the person in charge of Yūji. She believes it is to keep her from giving an unwanted testimony and that Yūji may be executed for his supposed attack on the consulate. She also announces that she will have a different job after her return to Langley but Chiara reasons that it is only to keep JB quiet. JB then warns her from speaking too much as they are under surveillance. Back on the girls' houseboat base, Kazuki/Thanatos announces that Yūji will be transferred from the holding facility on August 6 at 6:00 p.m. and that the girls must prepare a sum of 100 million before then. She created a series of plans in order for them to earn the amount within a day and assigns the girls to do various jobs. Yumiko sells one of Makina's possessions online and uses an auction site to buy and sell. Amane rents a car and is made to memorize complex route around the town. She once again finds Thanatos' voice familiar. Sachi opens a private bank account and later accompanies Makina to a gun maker where she picks up a specially made, pink colored sniper rifle which was ordered ahead of time by Thanatos. The shop's owner, Morishima, strongly hints that he knew Asako, Yūji's late mentor and guardian, since she was a child as Makina strongly reminded him of her. Michiru, surprisingly, was assigned the most tiring task wherein she literally traveled to different countries within the day engaging in a variety of transactions moving billions by following Thanatos' detailed instructions and ultimately left with just enough money to meet the required sum after which Thanatos explains their plan to rescue Yūji through a raid. Meanwhile, Chizuru, the now-closed Mihama Academy's principal, receives a call from Thanatos offering her a site for the new Mihama Academy school building which she quickly accepts. JB is seen relaxing while watching television in her quarters when her TV suddenly displays a message from Thanatos saying that "the Mihama Women's Volunteer Corps YK Rescue Campaign is underway" to her confusion. Back in the Ichigaya holding facility, Yūji is tied up lying on a bed and being monitored via surveillance by guards. Heath Oslo is then seen discussing the installation of the two warheads in a metropolitan area with one of his men who explains that one has been planted while a suitable location is still being searched for the other. They then discusses their own plan on retrieving Yūji. The next day, the day of the operation, Yumiko gives a pep talk to the girls reminding them that they were heading to a war zone where there was no guarantee of their lives and the girls eat what may be their last meal.
| 8 | "The Seed of Blanc Aile IV"; Transliteration: "Buran'ēru no Tane Yon" (Japanese: ブランエールの種IV) | June 7, 2015 |
On the day of their operation, the girls make their final preparations; Makina rents a hotel suite where she prepares her sniping position, Michiru meets up with a member of Yūji's organization and picks up a "toy" that Thanatos requested, Sachi goes to the grocery store and buys ingredients to make non-explosive smoke bombs and Yumiko discusses their plans with Thanatos. Meanwhile, in a military base in Okinawa, Milliela Stanfield, now a pilot, seduces her fellow pilot in a toilet and steals his uniform. By sunset, the operation begins as Yūji is being transferred to Akasaka to await trial. The armored car carrying Yūji is attacked by Oslo's men who kidnap him after killing the soldiers and strap a bomb on his wrist that is set to detonate in six hours or if his vitals weaken. Makina then causes a distraction on the road and takes out their cars' engines with anti-tank bullets. As they unload Yūji, Sachi uses her hand-made smoke bombs to blind them allowing her to knock them out as she is wearing a gas mask to cover her nose and eyes. As backup arrives for Oslo's men, Amane arrives as well and drives them all, along with Makina and Michiru, through the route she was taught and eventually out of the city. Along a mountainous road surrounded by a forest, they are ambushed by Oslo's men in a helicopter. Just as they are almost shot and killed, Millie arrives on a helicopter she stole from her fellow pilot earlier and takes down Oslo's helicopter. James Okada communicates with the girls and explains that Thanatos' core can be saved. While all this was taking place, JB arrives in the Thanatos System's room and frees Kazuki, the core, from the system with James' help and they make plans to meet up with the girls on Kazuki's "ship" that just arrived. Amane turns on a turbo feature on her car and launches them all to the sea where they land exactly on top of their houseboat, the roof of which had been greatly reinforced in order to accommodate the weight of a falling car. Just then, a submarine emerges from the sea and Kazuki appears on the deck and introduces herself as Thanatos.
| 9 | "The Seed of Blanc Aile V"; Transliteration: "Buran'ēru no Tane Go" (Japanese: ブランエールの種V) | June 14, 2015 |
Amane is thrilled to see Kazuki again and becomes emotional as the latter reminds the former of the promise they made years ago. Yūji regains consciousness inside a room and reunites with his old platoon leader Justin Mikemeyer who has been promoted to captain. Jimmy's wife, Zoey Graham, a CIA agent, enters the room and reveals that her father, a journalist who once pursued Oslo, was murdered by Yūji when he still worked for Oslo. Zoey then admits her desire to kill Yūji in revenge but he warns her that should he die right now, the bomb Oslo's men attached to him will explode and kill everyone on the ship. However, he declares that he will return and die by her hand after he settles the score with Oslo. Zoey accepts as she does not want Yūji to die before Oslo is killed. On the deck, Kazuki introduces Chizuru Tachibana as the ship's new owner and has it renamed as Mihama Academy. Yūji, having recovered, meets Kazuki on the deck and asks her about her plans. She reveals he inherited an island in Micronesia from Asako. Yūji then slaps Kazuki for worrying him so much for years and she apologizes. Yūji cries on her chest and Kazuki gives him two options: cut off his arm to remove the bomb and take refuge with her on the island for the rest of their lives or settle things with Oslo himself. He decides to go after Oslo and asks Kazuki to locate him. They then share a moment with each other. Yūji then reunites with Millie and comically punches her in the face on reflex having learned that she threw away her promising military career for him. He reveals his plans to face Oslo to the girls and promises to return. Michiru's second personality emerges and kisses Yūji for good luck which angers the other girls, including Millie, who proceed to punish her as Kazuki returns and reveals Oslo's location. As Yūji makes preparations to leave, JB warns him against fighting Oslo and explains that it was Oslo who gave Asako the bullet wound that ultimately killed her but this only fuels Yūji's desire to fight. He then leaves with Millie on a helicopter. On the ship, Kazuki declares that Oslo will be able to hijack the Thanatos System in a few hours so she decides to get rid of the System which is currently running on auxiliary power from a plant in the Pacific Ocean. Michiru is tasked with cutting the undersea cable that connects the System to its power source while the other girls will search for bombs that might be littered in the area. Yumiko is tasked with searching for possible locations of Oslo's planted nukes and comes up with two places, both of which are directly connected to Oslo. In Akasaka, the top brass of CIRS called in Agnes Garrett, Yūji's former superior in the naval academy, to give information on him. Kazuki contacts them and uses her former position as the Thanatos System's core to order Agnes to send a team to the potential bomb locations. Unfortunately, the CIRS top brass are arguing over whom to send to the areas until JB offers to take charge on-site. Finally, Yūji arrives at Oslo's base, kills the guard on duty, and sneaks in while silently declaring his return.
| 10 | "The Seed of Blanc Aile VI"; Transliteration: "Buran'ēru no Tane Roku" (Japanese: ブランエールの種VI) | June 21, 2015 |
Yūji invades Oslo's ship and takes out several of the latter's men. Meanwhile, Agnes and JB inform Yumiko that they are working on disarming the bomb Oslo planted earlier. Kazuki and Amane are seen in a dark room where the former is inside a capsule-like chamber where she deactivates the Thanatos System and asks Amane about her desire to associate with Yūji after learning everything about him. On the deck of Oslo's ship, Yūji meets a man who looks just like him but with white hair. The look-alike, who calls himself Du Pont, also refers to himself as Yūji and Kazuki's brother. The two engage in an intense and fast paced fight to the death. Yūji appears to have the advantage at first until Du Pont injects himself with a booster drug and tries to make Yūji do the same but he refuses. With the drug boosting his physical abilities, Du Pont gains the advantage which forces Yūji to take the drug as well. The two fight evenly but Yūji ultimately wins and kills Du Pont. Despite his exhaustion and injuries, he finally arrives in Oslo's office. Oslo welcomes him warmly but after seeing that Yūji has no interest in listening to what he has to say, Oslo prepares to fight and draws a katana that once belonged to Asako. They engage in combat but Yūji, in his current state, can only dodge. Eventually, Oslo disarms and impales Yūji who uses his remaining strength to push Oslo to his desk where Yūji grabs a pen and stabs Oslo in the neck, killing him. Yūji removes the bomb that was strapped to his wrist using Oslo's key and slowly walks away from the ship as it explodes. Just as he gives up all hope of escaping, he sees a vision of Asako and finds an exit just as the bomb detonates and destroys the ship. Two years later, the girls have settled down on Yūji's island. Makina is seen collecting some eggs from the chickens while Sachi goes fishing on the beach as Amane arrives by plane, having gone to a supermarket on the mainland. Kazuki is supervising Michiru doing homework as everyone arrives, including JB and Chizuru. They reveal that the new Mihama Academy building has been finished and the girls can return to school. Meanwhile, Yūji, who survived and took half a year to recover from his injuries, is seen fishing and talking with Yumiko who reveals that CIRS has been disbanded but a new organization will be created in its place but Yūji has no desire to return. He then questions his survival as he believes that he is not yet meant to die causing Yumiko to tell him to live for everyone's sake, especially hers and everyone later takes a group picture together. As Yumiko narrates and reflects on their experiences, the other characters of the series are shown to have returned to their normal lives and jobs. During the final scene, Kazuki is seen on the beach as Chizuru offers her a drink. Kazuki then takes off her metal arm and takes the drink, much to Chizuru's shock as she had believed the arm was a prosthetic when, in fact, it was actually a toy Kazuki wore because she thought it would be a funny joke.

=== Grisaia: Phantom Trigger ===
| No. overall | No. in season | Title | Original release date |
|---|---|---|---|
| 1 | 1 | "SORD" | March 15, 2019 |
| 2 | 2 | "Soul Speed"; Transliteration: "Sōru・Supīdo" (Japanese: ソウル・スピード) | March 15, 2019 |
| 3 | 3 | "Stargazer"; Transliteration: "Sutāgeizā" (Japanese: スターゲイザー) | November 7, 2020 |
| 4 | 1 | "Mother's Cradle #1"; Transliteration: "Mazāzu Kureidoru #1" (Japanese: マザーズクレイドル #1) | January 2, 2025 |
After the events of "Fruit of Grisaia", Mihama Academy has now become the public front for the training of elite SORD agents who handle cases the police and JSDF cannot. Teacher Shiori Arisaka of Mihama Academy's Class A is left conflicted at the thought of her students also being government assassins, and oversees the transfer of new student Taiga Sengoku into her class. Class A's handler Haruto Aoi assigns support specialist Christina "Chris" Sakurako Kujirase to be Taiga's superior officer, despite Chris's doubts she is suited for the role. Chris spends the rest of the day introducing Taiga to her fellow students such as snipers Tohka Shishigaya and Megumi "Gumi" Kumashiro, ninja Murasaki Ikoma, gunwoman Rena Fukami, and gunsmith Izumi Yamamoto. Taiga is determined to prove that she has what it takes to belong in Class A, but Chris advises her not to be eager to become an adult so quickly. Later, Chris informs Haruto that Taiga has become interested in becoming Class A's medic and has gone to attend a lecture at Kitaoka Medical University. However, they receive a report of an explosion at the university, leaving Chris concerned about Taiga's safety.
| 5 | 2 | "Mother's Cradle #2"; Transliteration: "Mazāzu Kureidoru #2" (Japanese: マザーズクレイドル #2) | January 9, 2025 |
Chris recalls being the sole survivor of a bombing that killed her parents, which is what motivated her to become an explosives expert. After the bombing at Kitaoka, headmaster Ichiru Sengoku briefs the students that an extremist religious group called "The Fatal Answer" (TFA) attacked the university in an attempt to steal a novel virus being studied there. However, they were locked out of the lab and resorted to taking several students hostage, including Taiga. Taiga's father Natsuki Sengoku then arrives, forbidding SORD from intervening and announcing that the Sengoku family has authorized an airstrike on the university to wipe out both the virus and the TFA. Despite SORD being ordered to stand down, Chris disobeys orders and heads to the university to rescue Taiga on her own. Ichiru also decides to defy her family and mobilizes SORD to rescue Taiga and the hostages before the airstrike hits. Chris infiltrates the university and is able to rescue Taiga and the hostages, but is badly wounded in the process. As the hostages evacuate, Taiga decides to stay behind with Chris to both protect her and buy time for the hostages to escape while the TFA regroups and surrounds her.
| 6 | 3 | "Mother's Cradle #3"; Transliteration: "Mazāzu Kureidoru #3" (Japanese: マザーズクレイドル #3) | January 16, 2025 |
SORD assaults the campus, and swiftly neutralize the TFA terrorists while rescuing Chris, Taiga, and the hostages. With Taiga's safety confirmed, the Sengoku family calls off the airstrike. Chris and Taiga are taken to the hospital where Ichiru treats their wounds. However, in light of the attack, Taiga's father steps down as her legal guardian and Ichiru is assigned the duty instead, much to her annoyance. Haruto suspects that the Sengoku family may have been behind the TFA attack to eliminate Taiga, but Ichiru refuses to confirm his theory. Afterwards, life at Mihama Academy returns to normal as Taiga takes up Chris' duties while she recovers. She and Haruto later pay a visit to Chris, and Taiga admits the entire experience at the university has taught her that she still is a child and has much to learn, so she shouldn't be in such a hurry to grow up, which pleases Chris. Chris meanwhile reflects on her mother's death and her own near death experience, and comes to terms with both by deciding that she will use her life to pass on her mother's love to others.
| 7 | 4 | "Phantom Blade #1"; Transliteration: "Fantomu Burēdo #1" (Japanese: ファントムブレード #1) | January 23, 2025 |
Chris returns to class after her injuries heal. At the same time, Murasaki's older sister Yuuki also returns to Mihama from an overseas trip. However, Murasaki is less than thrilled to see Yuuki again, and Yuuki explains to Shiori that her presence reminds Murasaki of her difficult family life as a child. Yuuki also reunites with Haruto, and they both reminisce about their time together in CIRS. She then submits a report to Ichiru detailing all of the information she was able to collect as she was traveling the world, including the location of the TFA's headquarters in Texas. Rena expresses curiosity about Yuuki, and Murasaki reveals that Yuuki is an assault ninja who specializes in assault operations. Taiga also recognizes Yuuki as the ninja that saved her from a kidnapping attempt several years ago. However, unknown to everybody except Murasaki and Yuuki, Yuuki suffers issues with memory loss due to an old wound, so she constantly has to refresh her memory from external sources. Class A soon becomes concerned with Murasaki's mood begins to worsen ever since Yuuki returned, and pressure Haruto into telling them about the time he was living at Murasaki and Yuuki's family home and nearly ended up marrying Yuuki.
| 8 | 5 | "Phantom Blade #2"; Transliteration: "Fantomu Burēdo #2" (Japanese: ファントムブレード #2) | January 30, 2025 |
Haruto and Murasaki the story to Class A and Shiori respectively. Many years ago, Haruto travelled to the Ikumo family village with Yuuki so he could learn the Ikumos' secret technique. However, the Ikumos are reluctant to teach the technique to a stranger but allow Haruto to stay. While there, Haruto meets a young Murasaki for the first time and quickly befriends her. Murasaki herself develops a crush on Haruto and desires him to become her master. Later, Yuuki and Murasaki's father admits to Haruto that the Ikumos are forbidden from teaching outsiders their secret technique, as there was an incident where an outsider attempted to learn it and ended up murdering many clan members. That night, the Ikumo clan gathers to debate on whether to teach Haruto the secret technique or not, but they are ambushed and slaughtered by the outsider, Momotaro. Haruto and Yuuki manage to kill Momotaro, but Murasaki misunderstands the situation and believes Haruto is the one responsible for the attack. She activates her secret technique, Phantom Blade, which gives her superhuman abilities. Yuuki attempts to use her own Phantom Blade to fight Murasaki, but is quickly defeated by her. Haruto is only narrowly able to defeat Murasaki. As a result of the battle, Yuuki suffered her memory loss issues. Back in the present, Yuuki decides to leave Mihama, claiming that she has another mission, but Haruto surmises that she's really leaving so that Murasaki will no longer be in a bad mood because of her. After Yuuki leaves, Murasaki admits to Haruto that she still and Yuuki still love each in other their own way that doesn't need to be communicated in words.
| 9 | 6 | "Bluest Blue #1"; Transliteration: "Burūesuto Burū #1" (Japanese: ブルーエストブルー #1) | February 6, 2025 |
Haruto is tasked with driving Ichiru and her old Phantom Trigger team to reunion. A flashback shows that Ichiru originally created Haruto as a designer baby meant to act as the core of her Thanatos System. Given how Ichiru and her team didn't have much experience raising a child, they assigned one of their team members, Aoi, to look after him despite her aggressive and brash attitude. However, Haruto truly bonded with Enishi Urushihara, who ended up being a great influence on his life. As Haruto grew older, Aoi acted as his master, training him in how to fight with the sword as well as imparting important life advice to him.. Later Aoi decided to take Haruto on one of the team's assassination missions without their knowledge, where he used Aoi's sword to slay numerous enemies own his own. While the team is troubled at Haruto becoming an assassin, he is ultimately allowed to join Phantom Trigger. Back in the present, Haruto leads the team up to a mountain shrine where they pay their respects to Aoi's grave.
| 10 | 7 | "Bluest Blue #2"; Transliteration: "Burūesuto Burū #2" (Japanese: ブルーエストブルー #2) | February 13, 2025 |
Back in the past, Haruto continues to perform missions alongside Aoi and Ichiriu's team. He also has many discussions with Enishi over the true nature of justice and whether his assassination missions really are right. However, one day, Enishi is arrested by CIRS internal affairs agent Nathan Black due to suspicion of leaking information. Determined to find out the truth, Ichiru decides to investigate the case, and discovers that Nathan had taken Enishi to a remote base that once served as a cult headquarters and CIRS training base before being abandoned. Upon arriving at the base, the team is immediately attacked by the guards and they retaliate. As the rest of the team deals with the guards, Ichiru infiltrates the base and find's Nathan's corpse. Enishi reveals himself and explains his arrest was a ploy so he could fake his death and defect from CIRS due to them being responsible for his wife's death. He flees the base with Aoi giving chase, but she is mortally wounded by Enishi's bodyguard Samejima and Enishi escapes. In the present, Ichiru privately reveals to her team that CIRS has tracked down Enishi to the TFA's headquarters in Texas, but decides not to tell Haruto yet. In Texas, Enishi muses about the beginning of the next stage of his plan.
| 11 | 8 | "Arisaka's Journal"; Transliteration: "Arisaka no Techō" (Japanese: 有坂の手帳) | February 20, 2025 |
Shiori reports to the school as usual, where Ichiru informs her that now that she has worked there for five months, she has an opportunity to quit, otherwise if she choose to stay she must work for SORD for the rest of her life. Seeing that Ichiru hired her despite knowing about her past, Shiori decides to remain in her position as a teacher. Later, Haruto informs Shiori that the students are preparing for an overseas mission, and one of her responsibilities is to judge whether all of the students are physically and mentally fit to take part. Taiga insists that she is ready to participate, but Shiori hesitates and cannot make a decision. She later confides to Haruto that in her past, her father attempted to commit a murder-suicide, forcing her mother to kill him in self defense. Afterwards, Shiori was bullied and made a social outcast due to the incident, which is why she feels at home in Mihama. The next day, she performs personal interviews on all of Class A, and ultimately decides that she will allow them to participate in the next mission on the condition she also accompany them. Ichiru and Nogami then discuss privately how in reality, it was Shiori who stabbed her father, but later psychologically repressed the memory. Ichiru is confident that as she spends time with Class A, Shiori will eventually confront and come to terms with her past.
| 12 | 9 | "Rite of Passage"; Transliteration: "Senrei" (Japanese: 洗礼) | February 27, 2025 |
SORD arrives in Texas to support CIRS' efforts to suppress the TFA, who are attempting to declare independence from the United States. As the members of Class A head off to take care of their respective missions, Shiori learns from Haruto that the TFA is being backed by a wealthy war profiteer named Gray Poole, who has provided the TFA with enough money, weapons, and manpower to resist the United States. In addition, the TFA is now led by a cabal of infamous criminals. Haruto also reveals he knows that Enishi has become one of the TFA's leaders, and has played a pivotal role in helping the cult resist CIRS' attempts to suppress them. After learning of a potential weakness in the TFA's headquarters, Haruto leads a team to infiltrate it and encounters Samejima. Despite his cool exterior, Haruto succumbs to his desire for revenge and relentlessly attacks Samejima until Rena interrupts their duel, allowing Samejima to escape. Meanwhile, Enishi plots his next move with the other TFA leaders, intending to escalate the battle despite knowing the TFA is doomed to ultimately lose.
| 13 | 10 | "Heaven's Door"; Transliteration: "Tengoku e no Tobira" (Japanese: 天国への扉) | March 6, 2025 |
Two civilians living in TFA territory, Patrick and Bruno, try to make a living scavenging from dead soldiers. When they try to take shelter in an underground bunker, they encounter Oliver, a TFA soldier who is looking after several young nuns. Oliver recruits Patrick and Bruno to help him escort the nuns to safety when the bunker falls under attack by SORD. Oliver leads the group out of the bunker, but several of the nuns are killed during their escape. They then link up with another TFA unit, but are forced to flee again when CIRS forces attack. Oliver and Bruno stay behind to buy time while Patrick tries to lead the remaining nuns to safety. However, more of the nuns are killed during the treacherous journey until only one, Natalie, is left. Patrick and Natalie take shelter in a trench and reunite with Bruno, who explains Oliver was killed trying to surrender. Radicalized by TFA propaganda, Bruno joins a frontal assault against CIRS lines and is killed when the entire TFA force is cut down. Natalie sacrifices herself to protect Patrick from a grenade, and he goes made with grief and begins firing his gun wildly before being shot in the head.
| 14 | 11 | "The Right Choice"; Transliteration: "Tadashī Sentaku" (Japanese: 正しい選択) | March 13, 2025 |
Tohka catches sight of Patrick firing wildly and shoots him in the head. However, as she and Gumi attempt to cross a minefield they are ambushed by TFA child soldiers. Gumi is unable to bring herself to shoot them and both she and Tohka end being captured. Meanwhile, Patrick awakens in the care of the leader of the TFA child soldiers, "A". Seeing that the helmet Patrick was wearing miraculously deflected Tohka's bullet, A considers Patrick a sage blessed by God. Using his influence, Patrick convinces A to order his troops to spare Tohka and Gumi, instead suggesting A and his squad leave the forest and the war behind. Meanwhile, CIRS forces assault the TFA's headquarters but Chihiro realizes the TFA is trying to lead them into a trap by demolishing a nearby dam and drowning the CIRS forces. As Ichiru and Haruto organize the withdrawal of friendly forces, Taiga falls behind but is assisted by Gumi and one of the TFA lieutenants, who now worships her after she saved his life in a previous battle. Murasaki and Yuki attempt to hack the TFA's network, but are confronted by Homura, a rogue member of their clan. Rena continues to fight her way through TFA forces commanded by Samejima, but is wounded when Samejima orders her men to indiscriminately fire through their own troops.
| 15 | 12 | "The Fated Answer"; Transliteration: "Unmei no Kotae" (Japanese: 運命の答え) | March 20, 2025 |
Maki manages to kill a TFA lieutenant but suffers a broken arm, while Rena is badly wounded by Samejima but is saved by a friendly squad. Meanwhile, Ichiru is forced to amputate Tohka's leg. With such heavy casualties among Class A, it is decided that all SORD students are to withdraw from the battle. However, Haruto leaves in secret to retrieve Yuuki and Murasaki who still have not returned, and tasks Arisaka to make sure the other students don't try to follow him. Yuuki and Murasaki are meanwhile pinned down by Homura, who releases nerve gas that impairs Yuuki. Haruto arrives and manages to defeat Homura, who quickly dies due to overuse of her abilities. However, Haruto decides to stay behind while Yuuki and Murasaki evacuate in order to pursue Enishi. At the bottom of the dam, Enishi prepares to take a secret elevator to escape before the entire dam is demolished. However, he is ambushed by CIRS soldiers and is badly wounded as he flees in the elevator.
| 16 | 13 | "Phantom Children"; Transliteration: "Fantomu Chairudo" (Japanese: ファントムチャイルド) | March 27, 2025 |
Haruto fights his way through the TFA base as it floods and collapse, killing Samejima when she tries to stop him. Meanwhile, Ichiru intercepts Enishi in the elevator and criticizes his need to start a pointless war in order to satisfy is own sense of justice. She then leaves him to die from his wounds. Upon returning to base, Ichiru orders all of the Class A to retreat now that the TFA has been dealt with and the official army forces are due to arrive soon. Class A reluctantly leaves since Haruto is still missing, and Ichiru offers to grant "amnesty" to any of them that want to take it, allowing them to leave SORD and live normal lives. Six months later, Rena, Murasaki, and Tohka all decide to leave SORD, with Ichiru deleting their and Haruto's identities from SORD's database. Murasaki returns home to take care of Yuuki, while Tohka returns to live with her father. Meanwhile, Arisaka and the remaining students of Class A carry out their duties as they wait for Haruto's return. Back in America, Patrick is busy taking care of the former TFA orphan boys when he encounters Rena, who is looking for Haruto. Despite suspecting her identity, Patrick wishes Rena luck as she leaves for her next destination.
