= The 100 Girlfriends Who Really, Really, Really, Really, Really Love You season 3 =

The 100 Girlfriends Who Really, Really, Really, Really, Really Love You
- Season 3
- Key visual for the third season
- No. of episodes: 12

Release
- Original network: Tokyo MX
- Original release: July 5 – September 20, 2026

Season chronology
- ← Previous; Season 2

The third season of the The 100 Girlfriends Who Really, Really, Really, Really, Really Love You anime television series is produced by Bibury Animation Studios. Originally announced in October 2025, the season aired from July 5 to September 20, 2026.

The opening theme song is "Daisuki♡Zutto Eien Ni♡" (大好き♡ずっと永遠に♡; lit. 'I Love You♡ Always and Forever♡') while the ending theme is titled "Kitare Koi Itare Ai" (来れ恋・至れ愛), both performed by Rentarō Family.

== Episodes ==
No. overall	No. in season	Title	Directed by	Written by	Storyboarded by	Original release date
25	1	"Cousin and Girlfriend"; Transliteration: "Itoko no Kanojo" (Japanese: いとこの彼女)	Hikaru Sato & Ryūta Yamamoto	Takashi Aoshima	Hikaru Sato & Shinpei Nagai	July 5, 2026
The host of a romance-themed TV talk show finds Rentarō's girlfriends at a mall and attempts to interview them about their love lives, not realizing that the outlandish stories they're telling are all about the same person. After attempting to interview Rentarō, she realizes all of his girlfriends are also especially outlandish, prompting Rentarō to confront the cameraman and interrupt the broadcast. Later, Rentarō meets his twelfth soulmate, his middle schooler cousin Chiyo Īn, who is the class representative of her class with a compulsive need for order. A series of mishaps culminates in Chiyo confessing to Rentarō, although both of them initially have misgivings about dating each other (since they are cousins). The mishaps are revealed to be caused by Hiro Īn, Chiyo's father and Rentarō's uncle, who believes Rentarō to be the only boy worthy of Chiyo and begs Rentarō to date her. Rentarō tells Hiro he has no right to decide his daughter's love life for her and says she has to make those decisions herself, but Chiyo assures him that her feelings are true, leading Rentarō to accept her confession.
26	2	"Chiyo's Family Coaching"; Transliteration: "Chiyo-chan no Famirī Shidō" (Japanese: 知与ちゃんのファミリー指導)	Yūichirō Aoki	Takashi Aoshima	Satoshi Shimizu	July 12, 2026
Chiyo meets the rest of Rentarō's girlfriends and attempts to correct their behavior to her liking, which causes the group to descend into chaos. When she loses her glasses and everyone else tries to comfort her, she apologizes to them before accepting a kiss with Rentarō. Later, Meme is accosted by the head of the school newspaper club, Toruru Kijineta, who underwent training to get her picture for the school newspaper. Rentarō and the other girls help her refine her disappearing act, which culminates in Mimimi serving as a distraction for Meme's disappearing act.
27	3	"The Japanese Teacher Has Blonde Hair"; Transliteration: "Kokugo Kyōshi wa Burondo Hea" (Japanese: 国語教師はブロンドヘア)	Yūichirō Aoki	Takamitsu Kōno	Nagisa Miyazaki	July 19, 2026
Rentarō meets his thirteenth soulmate, his new Japanese teacher Nadī-sensei. She presents herself as an American expatriate, but Rentarō deduces that she's actually Japanese, leading her to reveal her true identity as Nadeshiko Yamato. Meeting the other girls, Nadī convinces them to dress up based on their deepest desires, with each of the girls choosing an outfit (which Hahari later purchases for them to wear). After dressing up, Nadī reveals her true identity to them, officially joining the Rentarō Family.
28	4	"The Rentaro Family Idol Legend"; Transliteration: "Aidoru Densetsu Rentarō Famirī" (Japanese: アイドル伝説恋太郎ファミリー)	Yū Harumi	Takamitsu Kōno	Yū Harumi	July 26, 2026
Hahari organizes a school festival and invites a pop idol group to perform there. All the idols become seriously injured a week before the festival, and so Hahari hires idol trainer Kuori Tina to train the girls as idols. She tries to have the best seven girls perform without the other six, but she quits as their trainer when they refuse. Rentarō takes over training all the girls, and the group performs during the festival. Kuori lures the audience away from the performance with an autograph session with the injured idols, but Rentarō, his uncle Hiro, and various other characters (whom Rentarō invited through flyers) draw the crowd back including Kuori to the performance. Kuori decides to let the injured idols watch the show to prevent them from following her footsteps of destroying her friendship for popularity. After the festival, producer Jesus Nakai invites the girls into a production deal, but everyone rejects the offer due to romance being forbidden.
29	5	"Yasashiki-san's Gardening Club Tour"; Transliteration: "Yasashiki-san no Engei-bu Tsuā" (Japanese: 優敷さんの園芸部ツアー)	Shingo Tanabe	Yasunori Yamada	Satoshi Shimizu	August 2, 2026
Rentarō meets his fourteenth soulmate, the gentle giant Yamame Yasashiki. He learns about her passion for nature and gardening, and her intense fear of fire (after they encounter the vice principal in the garden burning mugwort on her back). Rentarō helps her with her gardening for the afternoon, in exchange for some flowers to make crowns for the other members of the Rentarō Family. When the vice principal's hair catches fire from the burning mugwort, Rentarō protects her from the embers, and she falls for him, confessing her feelings and joining the Rentarō Family. The next day, Yamame invites the other members of the Rentarō Family to tour the school's garden, with all of them wearing flower crowns and white dresses (the latter courtesy of Hahari). As they sample some of the fresh garden fruit and vegetables, the other girls decide to kiss Rentarō, but Yamame holds back as she feels her being taller would hurt Rentarō's pride. Rentarō notices this, and has the other girls help her feel better about herself by standing on mounds of dirt (thus making them taller than Rentarō), helping her muster up the courage to kiss Rentarō.
30	6	"Momiji-chan's Squishy Festival"; Transliteration: "Momiji-chan no Momimomi Fesutibaru" (Japanese: 紅葉ちゃんのもみもみフェスティバル)	Ryūta Yamamoto	Yasunori Yamada	Ryūhei Aoyagi	August 9, 2026
Rentarō meets his fifteenth soulmate, middle school student Momiji Momi. She's an amateur masseuse with a fetish for groping women's chests. She massages Rentarō to alleviate his muscle tension, and he helps the manga's illustrator Nozawa with illustrating the manga to give Momiji a chance to practice massaging men. Meeting the other girls, Momiji gives each of them massages before fondling their bodies and giving Rentarō a kiss.
31	7	"Thumbelinano and the Kusurivanian Family"; Transliteration: "Issun Nano-shi to Kusuribania Famirī" (Japanese: 一寸凪乃師と楠莉バニアファミリー)	Shingo Tanabe	Takamitsu Kōno	Shinpei Nagai & Royden B	August 16, 2026
Nano accidentally takes one of Kusuri's drugs that shrinks her down to a few inches in height. Rentarō tends to her needs in the classroom and has her spend the night at his house until the drug wears off. Later, Rentarō visits Kusuri's parents at her home. As her father confronts Rentarō about all the other girls he's dating, he and his wife are attacked by a pharmaceutical spy who attempts to kidnap Kusuri. Rentarō saves the Yakuzen family, and he and Kusuri share a kiss as they are approached by Kusuri's grandmother, who turns out to be Rentarō's sixteenth soulmate.
32	8	"Kusuri-senpai's Grandmother"; Transliteration: "Kusuri-senpai no Obaa-san" (Japanese: 楠莉先輩のおばあさん)	Yūichirō Aoki	Yasunori Yamada	Royden B & Hikaru Sato	August 23, 2026
Rentarō meets his sixteenth soulmate, Kusuri's grandmother Yaku Yakuzen. She took a more powerful version of the immortality drug that is unaffected by the neutralizer drug. On Kusuri's suggestion, she and Rentarō go on an outing together, though he soon realizes that she's treating him like a child rather than a boyfriend. He attempts to emulate Yaku's late husband, which amuses her enough to return his affection. Later, Kusuri attempts to integrate Yaku with the rest of the girls, though she has trouble remembering who is who, and by the time she gets everyone memorized, all the other girls have forgotten her name.
33	9	"Hardcore Hot Springs Hopping with a Chance of Heaven"; Transliteration: "Mizugi Honki Onsen Jigoku Meguri Nochi Tengoku" (Japanese: 水着本気温泉地獄めぐりのち天国)	Ryūta Yamamoto	Takamitsu Kōno	Ryūhei Aoyagi	August 30, 2026
Rentarō and the girls win a lottery to visit an onsen owned by the Hardcore Group, but quickly become overwhelmed by the extreme nature of the facilities there. Later, Rentarō meets his seventeenth soulmate, kendo club captain Kishika Torotoro. While presenting herself as a mature upperclassman, Rentarō soon discovers she has a secret fetish for being pampered like a baby. After he indulges her, the two agree to go out with each other.
34	10	"The Rise and Fall of the Proud Girlfriend"; Transliteration: "Kukkoro Kanojo" (Japanese: くっころ彼女)	Shinya Kawabe	Takamitsu Kōno	Shinya Kawabe	September 6, 2026
Kishika challenges the other girlfriends to a kendo match. She succeeds in defeating most of them, but Hahari defeats her with a sneak attack. Having identified Kishika's fetish earlier, Hahari indulges her in front of all the other girls. Later, a ramen shop owner attempts to create an unbeatable challenge ramen, but each iteration of the challenge dish gets completed by one of Rentarō's girlfriends.
35	11	"Of Children, Adults, Ladies, and Mothers"; Transliteration: "Kodomo mo, Otona mo, Onēsan mo, Okāsan mo" (Japanese: こどもも、おとなも、おねーさんも、おかーさんも。)	Yūichirō Aoki & Yūki Gotō	Takashi Aoshima	Shinpei Nagai & Yūki Gotō	September 13, 2026
Rentarō invites Hahari on a date to a museum themed around her favorite childhood TV show, where they win a special prize from a trivia game there. Later, Shizuka's mother confiscates her phone after finding out she's been using a text to speech app to communicate. Nano explains the situation to Rentarō, who goes to Shizuka's house to confront her mother.
36	12	"The 17 Girlfriends Who I Really, Really, Really, Really, Really Love (83 to Go)"; Transliteration: "Ore no Dai Dai Dai Dai Daisuki na Jūnana-nin no Kanojo (Ato Hachijūsan-nin)" (Japanese: 俺の大大大大大好きな17人の彼女（あと83人）)	Yūki Gotō, Yūichirō Aoki & Hikaru Sato	Takashi Aoshima	Yūki Gotō, Satoshi Shimizu & Hikaru Sato	September 20, 2026
Rentarō talks to Shizuka's mother about the way she treats her daughter, and after mulling over his words, she returns Shizuka's phone to her and starts trying to make amends with her. Later, Rentarō goes on various outings with each of the girls, after which the God of Love summons him to his shrine. Rentarō confides that he hasn't told any of his girlfriends about their fate if he didn't love them in order to ensure their love is genuine, after which he wakes up to all the girls providing a lap bed to him.
