= The 100 Girlfriends Who Really, Really, Really, Really, Really Love You season 2 =

The 100 Girlfriends Who Really, Really, Really, Really, Really Love You
- Season 2
- Key visual for the second season
- No. of episodes: 12

Release
- Original network: Tokyo MX
- Original release: January 12 – March 30, 2025

Season chronology
- ← Previous; Season 1 Next → Season 3

The second season of the The 100 Girlfriends Who Really, Really, Really, Really, Really Love You anime television series was produced by Bibury Animation Studios. Immediately following the first season finale, a second season featuring the same core production staff was announced. The season aired from January 12 to March 30, 2025, on Tokyo MX and other networks.

The opening theme song is "Arigato, Daisuki ni Natte Kurete" (ありがと、大好きになってくれて; lit. 'Thanks for Being So Lovable'), performed by the Rentarō Family, a unit formed by the cast members of girlfriends from the series' first two seasons. The ending theme song is "Unmei?", performed by Amane Shindō, Suzuko Mimori, Rie Takahashi, Lynn, and Kanon Takao as their characters.

== Episodes ==
No. overall	No. in season	Title	Directed by	Written by	Storyboarded by	Original release date
13	1	"Her Name."; Transliteration: "Kano no Na wa." (Japanese: 彼（カノ）の名は。)	Yūichirō Aoki	Takashi Aoshima	Taizo Yoshida	January 12, 2025
Kusuri makes a potion that causes the girlfriends to switch bodies. They find that kissing Rentarō drives their souls out of their new bodies and into their actual bodies. One by one, they all kiss him, allowing them to switch back to their own bodies. Later during lunchtime, Rentarō meets his seventh soulmate, a third-year middle school student named Kurumi Haraga with voracious appetite. Rentarō shares some of his food with her. The next day, Kurumi plans to eat menchi-katsu sandwich in cafeteria and convenience store, but the sandwiches are sold out at both places. Finally, Rentarō makes her one in the cooking classroom. He introduces her to the other girlfriends and suggests they enter an upcoming eating contest.
14	2	"The Beginning and the End! Food Fight Festival!"; Transliteration: "Kaimaku! Gekitō! Kecchaku! Fūdo Faito Fesutibaru" (Japanese: 開幕！激闘！決着！フードファイトフェスティバル)	Yūichirō Aoki	Takashi Aoshima	Taizo Yoshida	January 19, 2025
Rentarō and the girls participate in an eating contest, with Kurumi participating in each round and each of the others participating in different rounds of the contest. Their opponents include the Gorilla Alliance and Chankonomnishiki, the latter being the world champion of competitive eating. Rentarō and the girls surpassed the Gorilla Alliance in each round, but Kurumi starts to lose out to Chanko in the last round. Unbeknownst to all, Chanko is cheating by using a papier-mâché fake body with a hidden tank to spit out her food into. However, with the help of Rentarō and the other girls, they defeated Chanko in the contest and. Kurumi kisses Rentarō behind the venue upon receiving a gelato.
15	3	"What Does the Maid See?"; Transliteration: "Meido-san wa Mie Teru?" (Japanese: メイドさんは見えてる？)	Ryūta Yamamoto	Yasunori Yamada	Nagisa Miyazaki	January 26, 2025
Kusuri creates a potion that turns all the girls into babies, except Hakari. She and Rentarō spend the time looking after them while waiting for a safe time to administer the antidote one hour after the potion's activation, during which Hakari comes to understand just how much her mother worked to raise her. During lunch, Hahari mentions that her personal maid, Mei Meido, has rainbow-colored eyes, but she cannot open them because she has been smiling for a long time. None of the girls can get her eyes open, but Rentarō succeeds by tricking her into laughing at Hahari, in the process revealing her to be his eighth soulmate. Since Mei cannot disobey Hahari, Mei confesses to Rentarō on Hahari's orders.
16	4	"Super Soaked Maid Party"; Transliteration: "Nure Nure Meido Pātī" (Japanese: ぬれぬれメイドパーティー)	Takahiro Hirata	Yasunori Yamada	Ryūhei Aoyagi	February 2, 2025
Rentarō and Mei go on an outing to a park with sakura trees, with Mei insisting on being ordered around by him. Rentarō attempts to get Mei to make her own decisions, culminating in him giving her an "impossible" order. After getting her to accept him as her boyfriend, Rentarō hosts a water-gun tournament where all the girls dress up in maid uniforms. Through various tactics, all girls end up wet, but Rentarō declares everyone the winner before kissing them. Mei later reveals that Hahari hired her as a maid after rescuing her from freezing to death in a snowstorm.
17	5	"Most Athletes Are Masochists"; Transliteration: "Asurīto wa Kihon Doemu" (Japanese: アスリートは基本ドM)	Hikaru Sato	Takamitsu Kōno	Hikaru Sato	February 9, 2025
Rentarō meets his ninth soulmate, masochistic baseball club member Iku Sutō, who is recruiting members to replace the rest of the club while they're in the United States. Learning that she needs to win an upcoming game to prevent the club from being shut down, Rentarō helps Iku with recruiting calls. After pretending to reject a confession from Iku and accepting her as a girlfriend, Rentarō asks the other girls to help out with the upcoming match, giving them a chance to work off the weight each girl had gained from the eating contest. Iku pushes herself beyond her usual limits during subsequent training sessions, eventually prompting the other girls to do the same.
18	6	"A Homerun Promise"; Transliteration: "Kimi no Hōmuran ni Chikau" (Japanese: 君のホームランに誓う)	Ryūta Yamamoto	Takamitsu Kōno	Taizo Yoshida	February 16, 2025
Rentarō and the girls begin with the practice match against Jurassic High's baseball club. They successfully keep it tied until Iku is injured while trying to hit a powerful pitch. Jurassic High got a sizable edge over Ohananomitsu High until one of its players, Rapko Velocci, criticizes Shizuka over her poor performance, which drives Rentarō and all the other girls to improve their game to score enough points for Iku to win the game with the ninth grand slam, which Rentarō catches before Iku kisses him. Both teams are treated to yakiniku at the end, with Rapko apologizing to Shizuka for her comments earlier.
19	7	"Karaoke Crisis"; Transliteration: "Karaoke Kuraishisu" (Japanese: カラオケ・クライシス)	Yūichirō Aoki	Yasunori Yamada	Satoshi Shimizu	February 23, 2025
Rentarō and the girls visit a karaoke bar for a date, during which Shizuka's singing causes all the girls to become overwhelmed by her cuteness due to Kusuri secretly drugging everyone. Afterwards, Rentarō meets his tenth soulmate, second-year student Mimimi Utsukushisugi, who goes to extreme lengths to make herself beautiful to the point of arrogance. Having been sought by Nano in the past, Mimimi challenges her to a beauty-seeking contest to determine who will remain as Rentarō's girlfriend.
20	8	"The Beautiful and the Bold"; Transliteration: "Utsukushiki Mono-tachi" (Japanese: 美しきものたち)	Ryūta Yamamoto	Yasunori Yamada	Satoshi Shimizu	March 2, 2025
Nano and Mimimi compete in a beauty seeking contest, in which the two of them compete to identify beautiful traits in Rentarō's girlfriends. Rentarō himself serves as the tiebreaker round, but the contest ends in a draw when he strips himself of his beautiful qualities as they're identified. Nano apologizes for snubbing Mimimi during a junior high school beauty pageant, which sparked the bad blood between them, and reconciles with her. Later, Mimimi gets the idea of using a kiss-enhancing lip balm from Kusuri as a beauty treatment, making Rentarō and the girls gorgeous.
21	9	"The World Hair Only Grows"; Transliteration: "Kami no Mizo Shiru Sekai" (Japanese: 髪のみぞ知る世界)	Yūichirō Aoki	Takamitsu Kōno	Takashi Sano	March 9, 2025
Due to the sun's decreasing luminosity, an Arctic observatory predicts a new Ice Age in the near future, to Rentarō's horror. Kusuri offers a hair growth drug to experiment with hairstyles, but when Hahari takes a hair manipulation drug with it, it causes her hair to grow out of control and start molesting anyone it can find. The girls help Rentarō escape as the hair envelops the entire world, eventually working his way back to Hahari at its core and waking her up with a kiss. The excess hair is then sent into the sun, which is refueled to the point of averting the predicted Ice Age.
22	10	"Peekaboy-Meets-Girl"; Transliteration: "Kakurenbōi-Mītsu-Gāru" (Japanese: かくれんボーイミーツガール)	Yoshihisa Matsumoto, Hikaru Sato, Ryūta Yamamoto & Yūichirō Aoki	Takamitsu Kōno	Ryūhei Aoyagi	March 16, 2025
Rentarō meets his eleventh soulmate, fellow classmate Meme Kakure. A skilled knitter, Meme is shy to the point of using homemade plush toys and misdirection to hide from others. Rentarō proves his love for Meme despite her shyness and helps her assimilate into the group through a game of hide-and-seek. One by one, the girls are found until Meme wins the game by hiding in the vice principal's hat, with Rentarō bestowing a victory kiss before she manages to hide herself again.
23	11	"Tsundere Lost"; Transliteration: "Ushinawa-reshi Tsundere" (Japanese: 失われしツンデレ)	Kentaro Iino	Takashi Aoshima	Nagisa Miyazaki & Hikaru Sato	March 23, 2025
After having a nightmare about Rentarō breaking up with her over her tsundere personality, Karane takes one of Kusuri's drugs that removes her tsundere traits. While the other girls enjoy her newfound friendliness at first, they soon realize she's still likable as a tsundere. Karane refuses to reverse the change until Rentarō convinces her to do so. However, Kusuri's drugs do not work to restore Karane, so Hahari invites her and Rentarō to spend a night at Hanazono Mansion. Rentarō and Hakari experiment with ways to provoke a tsundere response from Karane, but none of their efforts work either. A nosebleed from Hahari necessitates a blood transfusion from her maids, which gives Rentarō an idea on how to fix Karane.
24	12	"The 100 Girlfriends Who Really, Really, Really, Really, Really Love You (89 to Go)"; Transliteration: "Kimi no Koto ga Dai Dai Dai Dai Daisuki na Hyaku-nin no Kanojo (Ato Hachijūkyū-nin)" (Japanese: 君のことが大大大大大しゅきな100人の彼女（あと89人）)	Ryūta Yamamoto	Takashi Aoshima	Taizo Yoshida	March 30, 2025
Rentarō manages to restore Karane's tsundere personality by using Kusuri's drugs to harvest tsundere energy from the other girls and transferring it into Karane. Afterwards, the girls take the opportunity to reaffirm their love for Rentarō one by one, with Rentarō in turn providing a lengthy speech about everything he loves about all of his girlfriends.

== Home media release ==
=== Japanese ===
Emotion (Japan – Region 2/A)
Vol.	Episodes	Cover character	Release date	Ref.
1	13–14	Kurumi Haraga	May 28, 2025	
2	15–16	Mei Meido	June 25, 2025	
3	17–18	Iku Sutou	July 30, 2025	
4	19–20	Mimimi Utsukushisugi	August 27, 2025	
5	21–22	Meme Kakure	September 24, 2025	
6	23–24	Rentarō Aijō	October 29, 2025	

=== English ===
Crunchyroll, LLC (North America – Region A)
Season	Discs	Episodes	Release date	Ref.
2	2	13–24	TBA	
