= The 100 Girlfriends Who Really, Really, Really, Really, Really Love You season 1 =

The 100 Girlfriends Who Really, Really, Really, Really, Really Love You
- Season 1
- Key visual for the first season
- No. of episodes: 12

Release
- Original network: Tokyo MX
- Original release: October 8 – December 24, 2023

Season chronology
- Next → Season 2

The first season of the The 100 Girlfriends Who Really, Really, Really, Really, Really Love You anime television series was produced by Bibury Animation Studios. It was directed by Hikaru Sato, with series composition by Takashi Aoshima, character designs by Akane Yano, and music composed by Shuhei Mutsuki, Shunsuke Takizawa, and Eba. The season aired from October 8 to December 24, 2023, on Tokyo MX and other networks.

The opening theme song is "Dai Dai Dai Dai Daisuki na Kimi e♡" (大大大大大好きな君へ♡; lit. 'To You Who I Really, Really, Really, Really, Really Love♡'), performed by Kaede Hondo, Miyu Tomita, Maria Naganawa, Asami Seto and Ayaka Asai as their main characters, while the ending theme song is "Sweet Sign" (スイートサイン), performed by Nako Misaki. The ending theme song for episode 11 is "Kyō no Ending wa Watashi ga Kaitotta kara Suki ni Shite Ii wa yo ne♡" (今日のエンディングは私が買い取ったから好きにしていいわよね♡; lit. 'I Bought Today's Ending, So You Can Do Whatever You Want♡'), performed by Sumire Uesaka as her character. Crunchyroll licensed the series outside of Asia. Muse Communication licensed the series in both South and Southeast Asia.

== Episodes ==
No. overall	No. in season	Title	Directed by	Written by	Storyboarded by	Original release date
1	1	"The 2 Girlfriends Who Really, Really, Really Love You (98 to Go)"; Transliteration: "Kimi no Koto ga Dai Dai Dai Dai Daisuki na Ni-nin no Kanojo (Ato Kyūjūhachi-nin)" (Japanese: 君のことが大大大大大好きな2人の彼女（あと98人）)	Yūichirō Aoki	Takashi Aoshima	Hikaru Sato & Nagisa Miyazaki	October 8, 2023
On his last day of middle school, Rentarō Aijō is rejected by a girl for the 100th time. As Rentarō visits a shrine and prays for a girlfriend, a God appears and tells him that in high school, he will meet not one, but 100 soulmates who will all fall in love with him. On his first day of high school, Rentarō bumps into two girls – Hakari Hanazono and Karane Inda – who are both his soulmates and begin vying for his affections. Back at the shrine, the God tells Rentarō that a person is supposed to have only one soulmate – if any – but because he made a mistake on the paperwork, Rentarō wound up with 100 of them. Because both Hakari and Karane are his soulmates, he cannot choose between them, and even if he did, any soulmate who does not enter a relationship with him will die. He briefly considers dating both of them behind each other's backs, but decides against it. Finally, Rentarō asks both of them to be his girlfriends at the same time, to which they agree.
2	2	"First Kiss"; Transliteration: "Hajimete no Chū" (Japanese: はじめてのチュウ)	Yūichirō Aoki	Takashi Aoshima	Taizo Yoshida	October 15, 2023
Learning that Rentarō has never kissed a girl before, Hakari and Karane start trying to get Rentarō's first kiss. Wanting to be fair to both, Rentarō devises an elaborate game that will let him kiss them both without anybody knowing who got it first. They try it several times, but things keep going wrong. Rentarō attempts to surrender his first kiss to the lascivious Vice Principal, only for the girls to tell them the other should have it, so the trio agrees to have a three-way kiss.
3	3	"The Quiet Princess, the Knight, and the Samurai"; Transliteration: "Mukuchi na Hime to Kishi to Bushi" (Japanese: 無口な姫と騎士と武士)	Yūki Gotō	Yasunori Yamada	Yūki Gotō	October 22, 2023
Rentarō meets his third soulmate, a shy girl named Shizuka Yoshimoto, who only communicates by pointing to words in a book. They bond over books as she gives him her favorite book. Later, Rentarō asks Shizuka to install a text-to-speech app on her phone and sends her a file containing the entire text of the book, allowing her to "talk" without breaking eye contact with the other person. Shizuka realizes that since the book was not released in e-book format, Rentarō must have transcribed it himself manually. Later, Rentarō asks Hakari and Karane to let Shizuka become his third girlfriend, vowing to commit seppuku if he cannot be a good boyfriend to all of them.
4	4	"Just When You Think It's a Hanky-Panky Episode"; Transliteration: "Ichaicha-kai to Omoiki ya" (Japanese: いちゃいちゃ回と思いきや)	Yūichirō Aoki	Yasunori Yamada	Satoshi Shimizu	October 29, 2023
Rentarō proposes a game of Old Maid to properly introduce Shizuka to the group, with the added penalty of the loser getting tickled by the winner. He wins the first three rounds, leaving each round's loser in last place. Shizuka wins the fourth round, but only goes about gently poking Rentarō. Sensing hostility from Karane, he steps out to let the girls talk things out among themselves. Karane tells Shizuka that she does not need to hold back because Rentarō loves her just as much as the other girls. When he returns, Shizuka decides she is ready for a kiss with him.
5	5	"The Hyper-Efficient Girl"; Transliteration: "Kōritsu-teki na Kanojo" (Japanese: 効率的な彼女)	Mitsutaka Noshitani	Takamitsu Kōno	Ryūta Yamamoto	November 5, 2023
Rentarō meets and falls in love with his fourth soulmate, Nano Eiai. She initially was not interested in Rentarō and repeatedly rejects his attempts to open up to her, considering him insignificant, but that night she becomes overwhelmed by thoughts of him. Rentarō requests a date with her the following day to prove himself, and the two visit an amusement park. Nano is excited by the attractions and believes she gained nothing from the outing at the end of the day. However, Rentarō proves she gained something by attempting to burn the Polaroid photos he took during the date, leading Nano to stop him and break down in tears. Nano asks Rentarō out, to which he accepts, and she makes it official with a surprise kiss. He also introduces her to his other girlfriends. The other girls are a little jealous that Rentarō went on a date with Nano, so Hakari suggests they visit an indoor water park.
6	6	"Everyone's Favorite: The Swimsuit Episode"; Transliteration: "Minna Daisuki Mizugi-kai" (Japanese: 皆大好き水着回)	Takahiro Hirata	Takamitsu Kōno	Taizo Yoshida	November 12, 2023
Karane sits at one of the sun benches wrapped in a towel at an indoor water park while claiming to feel chilly, Shizuka gets swept away down the lazy river due to being unable to swim, and Rentarō passes out from a nosebleed while being forced to fondle Nano and Hakari's chests. Due to being unable to perform mouth-to-mouth resuscitation on him, Hakari and Nano search for a male lifeguard, only to be accosted by three guests attempting to hit on them. When Rentarō is awoken when Karane tells him of the situation, the shocked male trio leaves in disbelief when Hakari and Nano both kiss him. He rescues Shizuka from the lazy river, before realizing that Karane is actually embarrassed about her own figure rather than feeling chilly. Rentarō removes her robe in one motion, revealing a white bikini she looks great in. Wanting to prove Rentarō is not patronizing her, he hugs her as she notices his heart is racing even faster than hers.
7	7	"Saying Hello to the Chemistry Girl"; Transliteration: "Hajimemashite no Okusuri Shōjo" (Japanese: はじめましてのお薬少女)	Ryūta Yamamoto	Yasunori Yamada	Satoshi Shimizu	November 19, 2023
Rentarō meets his fifth soulmate, but does not get the chance to talk to her. The next day, he finds a young girl named Kusuri Yakuzen in the chemistry lab. Kusuri serves him a flask of tea before going through an assortment of drugs she invented, after which she reveals that she spiked the tea she served him with a love potion due to falling in love with him at first sight. Rentarō attempts to regurgitate the love potion, but the drug quickly makes him overwhelmed, forcing Kusuri to administer a neutralizer. After the drug is cleared from Rentarō's system, Kusuri repeats her confession, taking on the appearance of the girl Rentarō saw the day before. Realizing that the third-year chemistry club president is his soulmate, Rentarō returns Kusuri's confession. Approaching the other girls, Kusuri gifts them with a variety of drugs based on what Rentarō told her about them. She then serves them cookies and two teas, one for Rentarō and one for the girls. Everyone assumes the big one is for the girls, unaware it was spiked with a drug to get Rentarō to kiss Kusuri.
8	8	"Kiss Zombie Panic"; Transliteration: "Kisu Zonbi Panikku" (Japanese: キスゾンビ♡パニック)	Ryūta Yamamoto	Yasunori Yamada	Ryūta Yamamoto & Hikaru Sato	November 26, 2023
Rentarō and Kusuri attempt to reach the chemistry lab to create enough antidote for the other four girls in zombie-like states, pursuing Rentarō for a kiss. Both groups split up, with Shizuka pursuing Rentarō first. He takes her to the nurse's office when she trips, subduing her by hanging her up on a clothes hanger from the curtain rail surrounding the infirmary bed. Hakari and Karane next pursue him, but he escapes them by making them kiss each other. He finds that Nano has beaten him to the chemistry lab and that Kusuri is hiding in a nearby locker. She tries to age herself up to sneak past Nano, but gives herself away. Kusuri shows the antidote to the other girls, after which bashful Hakari and Karane claim not to forget anything. Kusuri apologizes for this, but Rentarō promises to continue loving her even if she keeps making drugs.
9	9	"The Holy War of Love and Soul"; Transliteration: "Ai to Tamashii o Kaketa Seisen" (Japanese: 愛と魂をかけた聖戦)	Masato Jinbo	Takamitsu Kōno	Hiroyuki Shimazu	December 3, 2023
Hakari invites the group to a nearby park hosting a wedding-themed event with a bouquet toss, where the person who catches the bouquet will have their picture taken with their special someone. Among the participants is the Gorilla Alliance motorcycle gang, which leads Rentarō and the girls to work together to catch the bouquet. Shizuka wins the bouquet toss for the newly-christened Rentarō's family and Hakari wins a chopstick lottery to decide who gets to wear the dress for the photo. The other girls are invited to be in the photo, and afterward, Hakari asks Rentarō to break up with her. He follows her home, where she explains that her mother, Hahari, found out about Rentarō and the girls he was dating and is planning to transfer Hakari to a new school. After wandering through town, Rentarō decides to take his chances and break into the Hanazono mansion to rescue Hakari, with the other girls deciding to join in on the mission as well.
10	10	"Love Mission: Impossible"; Transliteration: "Rabu Misshon: Inposshiburu" (Japanese: ラブミッション：インポッシブル)	Takahiro Hirata	Takashi Aoshima	Takahiro Hirata	December 10, 2023
Rentarō and the girls infiltrate the Hanazono residence to rescue Hakari. They did not get her attention from outside the mansion as she does not answer her phone. Unlocking the door through a pet door, the group evaded the guards and the pets wandering the place. Kusuri offers a drug she planned to mail to a pharmaceutical company as part of a job application to get past a set of infrared sensors, while Rentarō and Karane climb past them together. As the other girls retreat outside, Rentarō and Karane make their way to Hakari's room, only to trigger an alarm that leads to their capture and escort to Hahari's chamber. Rentarō pleads his case with Hahari, but she rejects him, not wanting Hakari to experience the same heartbreak she did at her age. Hahari is soon revealed to be Rentarō's sixth soulmate once the drug wears off.
11	11	"Even If It Kills Me"; Transliteration: "Kono Inochi ni Kaete mo" (Japanese: この命にかえても)	Masanori Miyata	Takashi Aoshima	Takuya Satō	December 17, 2023
Hahari subjects Rentarō to a lie detector test to determine his feelings for her daughter. He passes the "pest trial" with flying colors, after which a maid informs Hahari that Hakari is trying to jump out the window. Karane takes Hahari hostage while Rentarō goes to save Hakari. He succeeds in talking her out of killing herself, but they fall out the window, with him redirecting their fall into the fountain. As Karane and Hahari emerge from the mansion, the latter realizes that Rentarō was not lying about his love for Hakari, proving that he will make her happy even if it kills him. She relents and formally asks him to take care of her daughter, with Rentarō promising to take care of both of them and accepting her earlier confession, to the shock of the other girls. Afterwards, Hahari invites Rentarō and the other girls to stay the night at the mansion. Upon washing up in the bath, the girls are dressed in pajamas, after which Hahari gets a nosebleed from the girls' overbearing cuteness. Rentarō goes with her to treat her nosebleed.
12	12	"The 100 Girlfriends Who Really, Really, Really, Really, Really Love You (94 to Go)"; Transliteration: "Kimi no Koto ga Dai Dai Dai Dai Daisuki na Hyaku-nin no Kanojo (Ato Kyūjūyon-nin)" (Japanese: 君のことが大大大大大好きな100人の彼女（あと94人）)	Yūichirō Aoki	Takashi Aoshima	Nagisa Miyazaki	December 24, 2023
As Rentarō is stripped down in Hahari's bedroom, a scream from the former causes the other girls to think Hahari is trying to get a head start on Rentarō. However, when the girls get there, they find Rentarō dressed as a girl, causing him to faint in embarrassment. After being awoken by a kiss from "Prince" Nano, Rentarō leaves to take a bath. The Hanazono family follow after him to try to peep on him, being joined by all the other girls except Shizuka, who gets tied up in a blanket to stop her from interfering. Failing to see anything through the bathhouse window, the group ventures into the attic. Rentarō accidentally exposes himself to Shizuka, and after the rest of the girls emerge from the attic, Karane blurts out their intentions to Rentarō, who immediately lectures the girls. Later that night, he finds Hahari at an altar for Hakari's late father and assuages her fears of unfaithfulness before kissing her. Upon leaving to collect their uniforms the following morning, Rentarō and the girls discover that Hahari has bought out the school to become the new chairwoman so she can spend time with Rentarō.

== Home media release ==
=== Japanese ===
Emotion (Japan – Region 2/A)
Vol.	Episodes	Cover character	Release date	Ref.
1	1–2	Hakari Hanazono	March 27, 2024	
2	3–4	Karane Inda	April 26, 2024	
3	5–6	Shizuka Yoshimoto	May 29, 2024	
4	7–8	Nano Eiai	June 26, 2024	
5	9–10	Kusuri Yakuzen	July 24, 2024	
6	11–12	Hahari Hanazono	August 28, 2024	

=== English ===
Crunchyroll, LLC (North America – Region A)
Season	Discs	Episodes	Release date	Ref.
1	2	1–12	March 25, 2025	
