= Even Healthcare =

Indian healthcare company

- Type: Private
- Industry: Healthcare
- Founded: 2020
- Founders: Mayank Banerjee; Matilde Giglio; Alessandro Ialongo
- Headquarters: Bengaluru, Karnataka
- Key people: Mayank Banerjee; Matilde Giglio
- Services: Managed care, primary care, hospital care
- Revenue: ▲₹27.2 crore (FY2025)
- Net income: ▼ −₹90.2 crore (FY2025)
- Number of employees: c. 650 (2026)
- Website: even.in

Even Healthcare is an Indian managed healthcare company with its headquarters in Bengaluru, Karnataka. The company was founded in 2020 by Mayank Banerjee, Matilde Giglio and Alessandro Ialongo. It initially sold healthcare memberships that combined primary care, diagnostic tests and cashless hospitalisation through partner hospitals and insurers. In 2025, Even opened its first hospital, a 70-bed facility on Race Course Road in Bengaluru. The company has since shifted towards running its own secondary care hospitals, where doctors are paid fixed salaries rather than fees linked to the procedures they perform.

In August 2026, Even laid off about a third of its staff as it phased down its insurance business to focus on hospitals. As of October 2026, the company operated two hospitals in Bengaluru and planned to open five more in the city within six months.

== History ==
=== Founding ===
Even Healthcare was co-founded in 2020 by Mayank Banerjee, Matilde Giglio, and Alessandro Ialongo. Before founding Even, Banerjee and Giglio had worked together on media technology ventures in the United Kingdom and the United States, including the news app Compass News.

The founders cited Kaiser Permanente as a model for the company, and described Even as a care provider rather than an insurer, which they said would allow it to lower treatment costs. The company began operations in February 2021, and by July that year it was working with about 100 hospitals. In December 2021, after signing agreements with Narayana Health, Fortis Hospitals and Aster DM Healthcare, Even launched publicly in Bengaluru.

=== Clinics ===
Even initially focused on preventive and primary care. In January 2023, the company set up a medical advisory board, which included clinicians from hospitals in India and the United States, to adapt international clinical guidelines, such as those of England's National Institute for Health and Care Excellence, for Even's members.

The company began opening clinics in Bengaluru later in 2023. By November 2024, it was running five clinics in the city and planned to spend up to US$7.5 million on two or three hospitals, which would offer secondary care such as routine surgery and maternity, but not oncology, neurology or emergency services.

=== Hospitals and restructuring ===
In May 2025, Even opened its first hospital, a 70-bed multi-speciality facility on Race Course Road in Bengaluru. In March 2026, it announced plans for a hospital in Indiranagar. In August 2026, the company laid off about 350 employees, approximately 30 to 35 per cent of its workforce, as it phased down its insurance business to focus on its hospitals. By October 2026, Even operated two hospitals in Bengaluru and planned to open five more in the city over the following six months, starting with Indiranagar. The Race Course Road hospital has been accredited by the National Accreditation Board for Hospitals & Healthcare Providers.

== Operations ==
=== Membership ===
Even's membership plans have offered unlimited consultations with its in-house doctors. Depending on the plan, memberships have also included diagnostic tests and care coordination, with hospitalisation cover supplied by insurance partners. In 2022, the company sold three individual tiers, of which only the highest included cashless hospitalisation, as well as group plans for employers. New members were assessed by doctors when they joined, to identify conditions such as diabetes, high blood pressure and obesity.

In November 2023, about 80 per cent of the company's subscribers had bought an insurance add-on with their membership. In October 2024, the company said it had about 200 corporate clients. Until 2026, most of its insurance business came from employer-linked group cover.

Even reported about 20,000 active members in November 2022, and 50,000 subscribers a year later, in November 2023. It reported more than 200,000 members in May 2026, and about 250,000 members in October 2026.

=== Hospitals ===
The Race Course Road hospital has operating theatres and critical care units, and offers orthopaedics, ENT, obstetrics and gynaecology, general surgery and internal medicine. Tertiary services such as oncology or cardiac surgery are not provided at Even's hospitals. The company leases its hospital buildings on 20-year agreements and pays for their fit-out and medical equipment. Giglio put the average cost of each hospital at about US$3.5 million.

Even's doctors are paid fixed salaries, along with bonuses linked to patient-reported clinical outcomes, and the company says all of its employees receive equity. Banerjee said most hospital revenue came from patients paying for treatment, with the rest earned through arrangements with insurers. Even has also said it is working with insurers on a model under which it would be paid for hospitalisations it prevents. The company publishes outcome data for its hospitals using standard measures such as the Oxford Knee Score, and in October 2026, it reported an unplanned readmission rate of below 1 per cent.

== Regulatory status ==
On 13 April 2022, the Insurance Regulatory and Development Authority of India (IRDAI) issued a public notice stating that Even Healthcare's plans were not health insurance plans and that the company was not registered with the regulator. The notice said that people subscribing to the plans did so at their own risk, and reminded the public that only registered insurers and their appointed agents and intermediaries may sell insurance. Even has described itself as a healthcare membership provider rather than an insurer, with hospitalisation cover supplied by partner insurance companies.

The company has distributed insurance through Euston Insurance Advisors, a wholly owned subsidiary registered with the IRDAI as a corporate agent. In May 2026, Even said that the subsidiary had received IRDAI approval to sell retail health insurance to individuals and families. In August 2026, the company began phasing down its insurance business as it moved to a hospital-led model.

== Funding ==
In 2021, Even raised a US$5 million seed round led by Khosla Ventures, with participation from Founders Fund, Lachy Groom and several individual investors. The following year, it raised a US$15 million bridge round from investors including Alpha Wave Global and Aspada.

In October 2024, the company raised US$30 million in the first tranche of its Series A round, which was led by Khosla Ventures with participation from Founders Fund, 8VC and Lachy Groom. In January 2026, an extension led by Lachy Groom and Alpha Wave, with participation from Sharrp Ventures, raised another US$20 million and brought the Series A to US$50 million. The Economic Times reported that the January 2026 round valued the company at US$153 million.

In October 2026, Even raised US$50 million in a Series B round led by Khosla Ventures, with participation from Alpha Wave. The company said the round valued it at US$300 million and brought its total funding to more than US$120 million.

== See also ==
- Managed care
- Health insurance in India
- Healthcare in India
