= Inda =

Inda may refer to:

- Inda, Estonia, a village in Märjamaa Parish, Rapla County in western Estonia
- Indas (Vidhan Sabha constituency), electoral constituency in West Bengal, India
- Indas (community development block), administrative division in Bishnupur subdivision of Bankura district, West Bengal, India
- Inda Selassie, in northern Ethiopia
- Inda (novel), by Sherwood Smith
- Alberto Suárez Inda (born 1939), Mexican prelate of the Catholic Church, Archbishop of Morelia since 1995
- Karane Inda, a character from the anime and manga series The 100 Girlfriends Who Really, Really, Really, Really, Really Love You

== See also ==
- Indu (disambiguation)
- Chloroceryle inda, green-and-rufous kingfisher, Nicaragua
- Agelena inda a species of funnel-web spider
