= Matilde Giglio =

Italian entrepreneur and business executive

- Born: 1991 (age 34–35); Rome, Italy
- Education: London School of Economics; LUISS Guido Carli University
- Occupations: Entrepreneur, business executive
- Known for: Co-founding Even Healthcare and Compass News
- Title: Co-founder, Even Healthcare

Matilde Giglio (born 1991) is an Italian entrepreneur and business executive. She is a co-founder of Even Healthcare, a managed healthcare company headquartered in Bengaluru, India. Before Even, she co-founded the London-based news app Compass News and worked as a venture capital investor at Hambro Perks.

Born in Rome, Giglio studied at the London School of Economics. She moved to India in 2019 to work on the Indian National Congress's digital campaign in the general election, and in 2021 co-founded Even with Mayank Banerjee and Alessandro Ialongo. The company began as a subscription-based primary care service and later opened its own hospitals in Bengaluru. In October 2026, Even raised a US$50 million Series B led by Khosla Ventures at a valuation of about US$300 million.

== Early life and education ==
Giglio was born in Rome, Italy. She attended the Liceo classico Visconti in Rome and studied at the London School of Economics.

== Career ==
=== Compass News ===
In 2015, Giglio and Mayank Banerjee, who had met in London that year, co-founded Compass News, a journalism-technology company based in London and New York. The company used machine learning to select news for younger readers and partnered with publications including the Financial Times and The Economist.

In late 2016, the founders surveyed students at British universities about their news habits, and then built an app that summarised the day's main stories in short bulletins twice a day. The app launched in November 2017. In 2018, the company raised about US$2 million, joined the media start-up accelerator Matter, and Giglio and Banerjee relocated to New York.

=== Hambro Perks ===
Giglio joined the London-based investment firm Hambro Perks (now Salica Investments), which had invested in Compass News, as a partner. She led the firm's investments in healthcare and financial technology.

While at Hambro Perks, Giglio took an interest in the integrated insurance and care model of Kaiser Permanente. She has said she looked for a country where a similar model could work before choosing India.

=== Even Healthcare ===
In 2019, Giglio moved to New Delhi to lead the digital campaign of the Indian National Congress in that year's general election.

In 2021, She co-founded Even Healthcare in Bengaluru with Banerjee and Alessandro Ialongo. The company started as a subscription-based healthcare service and later moved into running its own hospitals. It opened its first hospital, a 70-bed facility in Bengaluru, in July 2025, and a second in the city the following year.

Even raised a US$5 million seed round in 2021, US$15 million from Alpha Wave and Aspada in November 2022, a US$30 million Series A led by Khosla Ventures in October 2024, and a US$20 million round led by Lachy Groom and Alpha Wave in January 2026. In October 2026, it raised US$50 million in a Series B round led by Khosla Ventures, with participation from Alpha Wave, Founders Fund and 8VC, at a valuation of about US$300 million. The round brought its total funding to more than US$120 million. The company reported about 250,000 members across ten Indian cities.

== Views ==
Giglio has argued that private healthcare in India rewards the volume of procedures rather than patient outcomes, and that insurers and hospitals have conflicting interests.

== Personal life ==
Giglio divides her time between Bengaluru and Rome. She is married and had a son in 2026.
