= Indira Nagar =

Indira Nagar may refer to several places in India named after Indira Gandhi:

- Indiranagar, Mysore, Karnataka
- Indiranagar, Bengaluru, Karnataka
- Indira Nagar, Chennai, Tamil Nadu
  - Indira Nagar railway station
- Indira Nagar, Lucknow, Uttar Pradesh
  - Indira Nagar metro station (Lucknow)
- Indira Nagar, Srinagar, Jammu and Kashmir
- Indira Nagar Assembly constituency, Pondicherry
- Indira Nagar (Vile Parle) metro station, Mumbai Metro

== See also ==
- Indira (disambiguation)
- Indira Nagar metro station (disambiguation)
- Nagar (disambiguation)
