= Indu =

Indu or INDU may refer to:

- $INDU, a symbol for the Dow Jones Industrial Average
- Chandra, the Hindu moon deity
- Indu, peoples of Indian (or South Asian) descent, e.g. Indu-Chinese, Indu-Trini etc.
- Indu, an Indian film starring Roja Selvamani
- Indu Film, an Indian company
- Indu chakra, a group of 6 musical scales in Carnatic music
- Indu, a Bengali Kayastha surname in India
- the official acronym for the Canadian House of Commons Standing Committee on Industry, Science and Technology
- Indira "Indu", a fictional character portrayed by Kajal Aggarwal in the 2009 Indian film Magadheera
- Indu R. Sakseria, character in the 2010 Indian film Raajneeti, played by Katrina Kaif

== See also ==
- Inda (disambiguation)
- Indira (disambiguation)
