= Indira (name) =

- Pronunciation: IPA: [ɪnd̪ɪra] Sanskrit: इन्दिरा
- Gender: Female
- Language: Sanskrit

Origin
- Meaning: "beauty" "splendid"
- Region of origin: Indian subcontinent

Other names
- Related names: Indra

Indira is a Hindu/Sanskrit Indian popular feminine given name, which means "beauty" and "splendid". It is an epithet of Hindu goddess Lakshmi.

== Given name ==
India's former Prime Minister Indira Gandhi (1917–1984) is the most notable figure bearing this name. Indira may also refer to—

- Indira Ampiot (born 2004), French model and Miss France 2023
- Indira Bajt (born 1980), Kazakhstani-Slovenian chess player
- Indira Billi (born 1936), Indian film actress
- Indira Devi Chaudhurani (1873–1960), Bengali Indian literateur, author, and musician
- Indira Devi (1892–1968), Indian autobiographer
- Indira Hridayesh (1941–2021), Indian politician
- Indira Ilić (born 1986), Serbian footballer
- Indira Jaising (born 1940), Indian lawyer, feminist, and human rights activist
- Indira Freitas Johnson (born 1943), Indian artist and nonviolence educator
- Indira Kadambi (born 1969), Indian performer and dance teacher
- Indira Kastratović (born 1970), Macedonian handball player
- Indira Levak (born 1973), Croatian singer
- Indira Kempis Martínez (born 1982), Mexican politician
- Indira Anant Maydeo, member of Indian National Congress
- Indira Miri (1910–2004), Indian educationist
- Indira Naidoo (born 1968), Australian writer, journalist, and TV presenter
- Indira Naidoo-Harris, Canadian politician
- Indira Nath (1938–2021), Indian immunologist
- Indira Neville (born 1973), New Zealand comics artist, community organiser and musician
- Indira Parthasarathy, (born 1930), Indian writer and playwright
- Indira Radić (born 14 June 1966), Serbian singer
- Indira Samarasekera (born 1952) Canadian-Sri Lankan twelfth president and vice-chancellor of the University of Alberta
- Indira Sant (1914–2000), Indian poet
- Indira Vizcaíno Silva (born 1987), Mexican politician
- Indira Spence (born 1986), Jamaican hurdler
- Indira Stefanianna (born 1946), American/Icelandic actress and singer
- Indira Talwani (born 1960), American lawyer and jurist
- Indira Terrero (born 1985), Cuban-Spanish sprinter
- Indira Varma (born 1973), English actress
- Indira Weis (born 1979), Indian-German actress and singer

== Fictional characters ==
- Indira, from Abdul Rashid Kardar's 1950 film Dastan
- Indira, from The Walking Dead: World Beyond
