= Indira Kadambi =

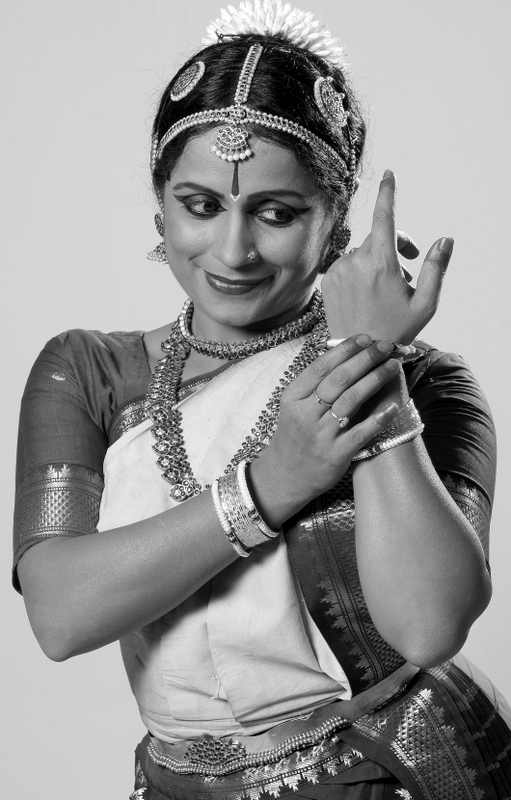
- Indira Kadambi striking a graceful pose
- Born: 1969 (age 56–57); Udupi district, Karnataka, India
- Occupations: Bharatanatyam dancer, dance educator
- Years active: 1980s–present
- Organization: Ambalam Foundation
- Known for: Bharatanatyam, online dance education
- Spouse: Ramprasadh
- Children: Vishnu Ramprasadh

Indira Kadambi is an Indian Bharatanatyam dancer and online dance and music educator.

== Early life and training ==
Kadambi began training at the age of six under Sri Janardhan Sharma. She later trained with Smt. Usha Datar and made her debut performance in 1988. Her advanced training continued her advanced training under Smt. Narmada and Smt. Savitri Jagannath Rao.

Kadambi studied abhinaya under Padma Bhushan awardee Kalanidhi Narayanan and trained in Mohiniattam under Kalyanikutty Amma. In addition to dance, she studied Carnatic vocal music with Belakawadi Srinivasa Iyengar and nattuvangam with Kamala Rani of Kalakshetra.

== Career ==
Kadambi has performed in India and abroad, including appearances in the United Kingdom, United States, Germany, France, Switzerland, and Malaysia. Her work includes dance performances, lecture demonstrations, and workshops. She has also participated in radio interviews and television programmes related to Indian classical dance.

She is an empanelled artist of the Indian Council for Cultural Relations (ICCR), Government of India.

== Institution ==
In 1987, Indira Kadambi and Ramprasadh founded the Ambalam Foundation, an institution focused on training in Bharatanatyam and Carnatic music. In 2011, they launched eAmbalam, an online platform offering instruction in Bharatanatyam, Carnatic music, and Indian percussion.

The foundation later introduced educational programmes in schools that integrated music, dance, yoga, and personality development. Kadambi currently teaches students in Bangalore and conducts specialised training in abhinaya and nattuvangam.

== Choreographic works ==
Kadambi has choreographed and presented several solo dance productions, including:

- Koham – The Search
- Varsha Rithu
- Vamshi – The Divine Flute
- Hasya
- Purusha Parinaam
- Sadashivam Darisanam
- Ashta Nayikarina Ishta Murugan
- Manomaaneeyam
- Juganbandhi
- Kavya–Chitra–Geeta–Nritya

== Lecture demonstrations ==
- Vaachika Abhinaya in Bharathi Vritti (Bangalore, 1996)
- Dance-in-Depth (Los Angeles, 1998)
- Ashtanayika (Philadelphia, 2003)
- Extensions to Tradition (Chennai, 2005)
- Hasya Rasa (The School, KFI, 2003)

== Awards ==
- Best Dancer Award – South Central Zone Cultural Centre, Government of India (1993)
- Natya Shanthala – Aryabhatta Cultural Association, Bangalore (1996)
- Senior Dancer Award – Natyarangam, Narada Gana Sabha, Chennai (2002)
- Nrithya Kala Sagara – Cleveland Thyagaraja Aradhana
- Vidya Tapaswi – Tapas Foundation, Chennai
