= Indira Nagar metro station =

Indira Nagar metro station may refer to:

- Indira Nagar metro station (Bengaluru), a metro station on the Purple Line of Namma Metro
- Indira Nagar metro station (Lucknow), a metro station on the Red Line of Lucknow Metro
