= Indira Mount =

Seamount in the Southern Ocean

- Location within Antarctica

Highest point
- Coordinates: 53°39.79′S 47°55.82′E

Indira Mount is a seabed mountain in the Antarctic Ocean (also known as the Southern Ocean). It was discovered during the First Indian Expedition to Antarctica (1981–82) when the team was moving from Mauritius to Antarctica. It was named as Indira Mount after the former Prime Minister of India Mrs Indira Gandhi by the expedition members.
