= Bibury Animation Studios =

Japanese animation studio

Bibury Animation Studios G.K.
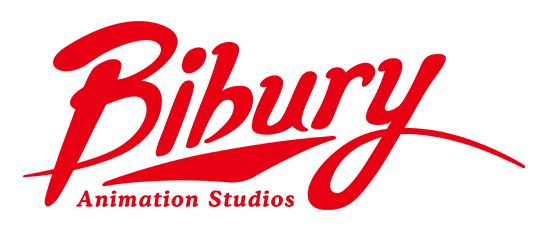

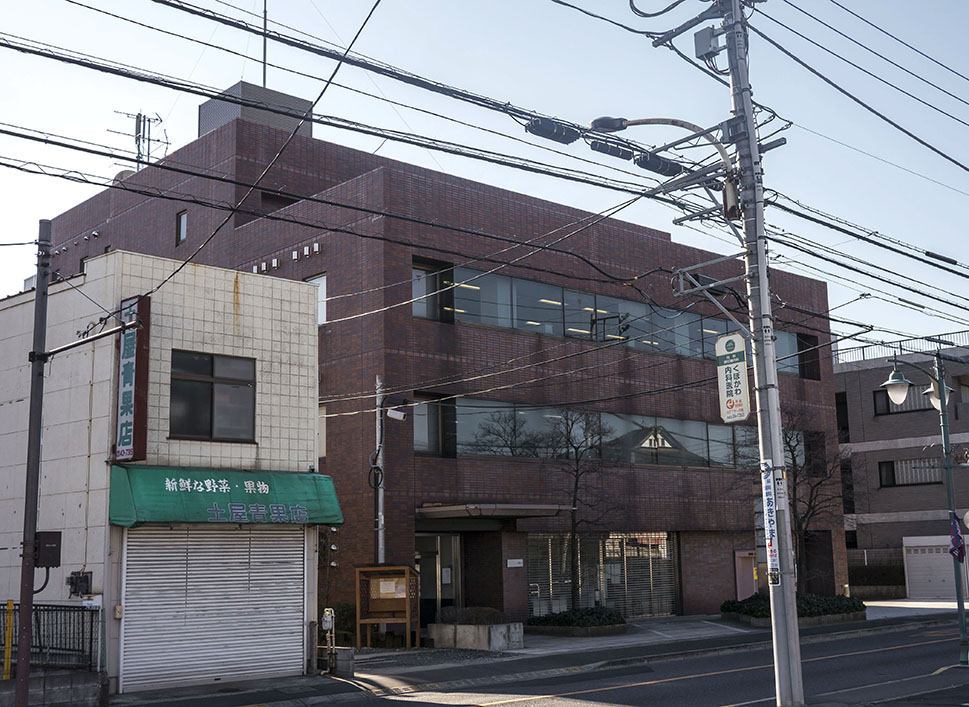
- Headquarters in Mitaka, Tokyo
- Native name: 合同会社バイブリーアニメーションスタジオ
- Type: Gōdō gaisha
- Industry: Japanese animation
- Founded: May 1, 2017; 9 years ago
- Founder: Tensho
- Headquarters: Shimorenjaku, Mitaka, Tokyo, Japan
- Key people: Tensho (CEO)
- Total equity: ¥ 41,000,000
- Number of employees: >100
- Divisions: Bibury Animation CG (Note: Bibury Animation CG (バイブリーアニメーションCG), an animation substudio specializing in 3DCGI, photography, and special effects.); Scenic Art Studio (Note: Scenic Art Studio (シーニックアートスタジオ), also known as Scenic Art Studio - L'Air Bleu Vert, an animation studio division launched in February 3, 2026, specializing in animation backgrounds.)
- Subsidiaries: Bakuga Animation Company (Note: bakuga animation company, aka Bakuga Osaka Studio (爆画大阪スタジオ), an animation studio located in Osaka, Japan founded in April 2025.)
- Website: bibury-st.com

Bibury Animation Studios G.K. (Japanese: 合同会社バイブリーアニメーションスタジオ, Hepburn: Gōdō-gaisha Baiburī Animēshon Sutajio) is a Japanese animation studio founded on May 1, 2017.

== History ==
Bibury Animation Studios was founded on May 1, 2017 by Motoki "Tensho" Tanaka, an animation director and director of Kin-iro Mosaic, the Grisaia series, and Rewrite, both for the animation component of the visual novel while working for White Fox and later for the anime by 8-Bit. For the first two years of the company's existence, the studio worked solely as a sub-contracting studio, providing mostly in-between and 2nd key animation services. In 2019, the studio produced its first major work, Grisaia: Phantom Trigger the Animation, directed by studio founder Tensho (who directed previous installments of the series), and in the same year, its first television series, Azur Lane: The Animation.

It has a sister studio, Bibury Animation CG, which provides 3DCG animation and designs as an outsourcing company for other studios, including Bibury itself. It also has another studio, bakuga animation company, founded in April 1, 2025, and located in Osaka, specializing in digital animation.

On February 3, 2026, the studio's founder Tensho announced on X the establishment of background art studio, Scenic Art Studio, which focuses on high quality of backgrounds.

== Works ==
=== Television series ===
Title	Director(s)	First run start date	First run end date	Eps	Note(s)	Ref.
Azur Lane: The Animation	Tensho	October 3, 2019	March 20, 2020	12	Based on a video game developed by Shanghai Manjuu and Xiamen Yongshi.	
The Quintessential Quintuplets (season 2)	Kaori	January 8, 2021	March 26, 2021	12	Sequel to The Quintessential Quintuplets by Tezuka Productions.	
Black Rock Shooter: Dawn Fall	Tensho	April 3, 2022	June 19, 2022	12	Based on characters created by Huke. Co-produced with Bibury Animation CG.	
Prima Doll	Tensho	July 9, 2022	September 24, 2022	12	Based on a mixed media project by Key.	
Magical Destroyers	Hiroshi Ikehata	April 8, 2023	June 24, 2023	12	Original work by Jun Inagawa.	
The 100 Girlfriends Who Really, Really, Really, Really, Really Love You (season 1)	Hikaru Sato	October 8, 2023	December 24, 2023	12	Based on a manga by Rikito Nakamura and Yukiko Nozawa.	
The Quintessential Quintuplets*	Masato Jinbo	December 24, 2024	December 24, 2024	2	Sequel to The Quintessential Quintuplets Movie.	
Grisaia: Phantom Trigger the Animation	Kousuke Murayama	January 2, 2025	March 27, 2025	13	Based on a video game developed by Frontwing.	
The 100 Girlfriends Who Really, Really, Really, Really, Really Love You (season 2)	Hikaru Sato	January 12, 2025	March 30, 2025	12	Sequel to The 100 Girlfriends Who Really, Really, Really, Really, Really Love You.	
Witch Watch	Hiroshi Ikehata	April 6, 2025	October 5, 2025	25	Based on a manga by Kenta Shinohara.	
Chainsmoker Cat	Taku Kimura	July 3, 2026	September 25, 2026	12	Based on a manga by NyanNyanFactory.	
The 100 Girlfriends Who Really, Really, Really, Really, Really Love You (season 3)	Hikaru Sato	July 5, 2026	September 20, 2026	12	Sequel to The 100 Girlfriends Who Really, Really, Really, Really, Really Love You 2nd Season.	
Witch Watch (season 2)	Hiroshi Ikehata	2027	TBA	TBA	Sequel to Witch Watch. Co-produced with Studio Massket.	

=== Films ===
Title	Director(s)	Release Date	Note(s)	Ref.
Grisaia: Phantom Trigger the Animation	Tensho	March 15, 2019	Sequel to The Eden of Grisaia.	
Grisaia: Phantom Trigger the Animation Stargazer	Kousuke Murayama	November 27, 2020	Sequel to Grisaia: Phantom Trigger the Animation.	
The Quintessential Quintuplets Movie	Masato Jinbo	May 20, 2022	Sequel to The Quintessential Quintuplets 2.	
Gekijōban Gochūmon wa Usagi Desu ka? We Are Family!	Hiroyuki Hashimoto (Chief); Tensho	TBA	Related to Is the Order a Rabbit?	

=== Video games ===
Year	Title	Notes	Ref.
2018	Summer Pockets	Opening animation	
2023–2024	Prima Doll	Illustrations	

== Notable staff ==
=== Representative staff ===
- Motoki "Tensho" Tanaka (president)

=== Animation producers ===
- Hidehisa Taniguchi (2019~present)
- Masahiro Obata (2020~present)
- Keisuke Yamamoto (2021~present)

=== Directors ===
- URA (director) (Bibury Animation CG; 2021~present)
