= The 100 Girlfriends Who Really, Really, Really, Really, Really Love You =

Japanese manga series and its adaptations

- First tankōbon volume cover, featuring Hakari Hanazono (left) and Karane Inda (right)

君のことが大大大大大好きな100人の彼女 (Kimi no Koto ga Dai Dai Dai Dai Daisuki na Hyaku-nin no Kanojo)
- Genre: Harem; Romantic comedy; Parody
- Manga
- Written by: Rikito Nakamura
- Illustrated by: Yukiko Nozawa
- Published by: Shueisha
- English publisher: NA: Seven Seas Entertainment
- Imprint: Young Jump Comics
- Magazine: Weekly Young Jump
- Original run: December 26, 2019 – present
- Volumes: 27
- Light novel

Secret Love Story
- Written by: Hamubane (story); Rikito Nakamura (concept)
- Illustrated by: Yukiko Nozawa
- Published by: Shueisha
- English publisher: NA: Seven Seas Entertainment
- Imprint: Jump J-Books
- Published: July 19, 2023
- Anime television series
- Directed by: Hikaru Sato
- Written by: Takashi Aoshima
- Music by: Shuhei Mutsuki; Shunsuke Takizawa; Eba
- Studio: Bibury Animation Studios
- Licensed by: Crunchyroll; SA/SEA: Muse Communication
- Original network: Tokyo MX, SUN, GYT, BS11, AT-X (S1–3); KBS Kyoto (S1 & 2)
- Original run: October 8, 2023 – September 20, 2026
- Episodes: 36
- icon

The 100 Girlfriends Who Really, Really, Really, Really, Really Love You, (Note: Japanese: 君のことが大大大大大好きな100人の彼女, Hepburn: Kimi no Koto ga Dai Dai Dai Dai Daisuki na Hyaku-nin no Kanojo) often referred to simply as The 100 Girlfriends, (Note: 100人の彼女, Hyaku-nin no Kanojo) or Hyakkano (100カノ), is a Japanese manga series written by Rikito Nakamura and illustrated by Yukiko Nozawa. It has been serialized in Shueisha's seinen manga magazine Weekly Young Jump since December 2019, with its chapters collected in 27 tankōbon volumes as of September 2026. The manga has been licensed for English release in North America by Seven Seas Entertainment.

The series follows high school student Rentaro Aijo, who, after 100 consecutive romantic rejections, is visited by the God of Love at a shrine. The god reveals a divine error has destined Rentaro with 100 soulmates, but warns that any soulmate he rejects will be cursed with fatal misfortune. To prevent their deaths, Rentaro resolves to date them all at the same time.

An anime television series adaptation produced by Bibury Animation Studios aired from October to December 2023. A second season aired from January to March 2025. A third season aired from July to September 2026.

== Plot ==
Rentaro Aijo has confessed to and been rejected by 100 girls in his lifetime. On the last day of middle school, he visits a shrine and prays that he get a girlfriend during his time at high school. Suddenly, the God of Love appears and tells Rentaro that the reason for his non-existent love life is because everyone is only supposed to have one soulmate in their life. Due to a clerical error on the God of Love's part, Rentaro is destined to have 100 which is to begin when he enters high school.

On the first day of high school, Rentaro meets the nymphomaniacal Hakari Hanazono and tsundere Karane Inda, the first two soulmates. They experience love at first sight, but Rentaro cannot decide between the two. That evening, he revisits the God of Love and is informed that if he does not return the feelings of any of his 100 soulmates, they will die in an accident. Not wanting such a fate to befall the girls, Rentaro decides to date all of them simultaneously, beginning with Hakari and Karane with their blessing.

As the series progresses, more girls are introduced and become Rentaro's girlfriends, establishing a polyamorous relationship called the "Rentaro Family". The story revolves around Rentaro meeting new girlfriends and the interactions between the Rentaro Family members.

== Characters ==
Rentaro Aijo (愛城 恋太郎, Aijō Rentarō)
Voiced by: Wataru Katoh, Yurina Amami (baby) (Japanese); Travis Mullenix (English)
The male protagonist, Rentaro is a high school freshman of Class 1–4 at Ohananomitsu High School. Prior to the beginning of the story, he has fallen in love and been rejected 100 times, causing him to strive to better himself and become the perfect boyfriend. Due to a clerical error by the God of Love, Rentaro is destined to have 100 soulmates by the end of his time in high school. Rentaro recognizes new girlfriends when he makes eye contact with them for the first time, and a shock-like feeling overcomes him and his potential new girlfriend. Over time, Rentaro comes to love each and every new girlfriend he meets and intends to marry all of them once they are all ready, with all of his girlfriends agreeing to share him as part of the "Rentaro Family".^{[ch. 146]}

=== Rentaro's Girlfriends ===
Girlfriend	Name	Voiced by	Character description
1–2	Hakari Hanazono (花園 羽香里, Hanazono Hakari)	Kaede Hondo (Japanese); Sarah Wiedenheft (English)	Hakari is one of Rentaro's first two girlfriends along with Karane Inda as well as his classmate in Class 1–4. She is an honor student born into a wealthy family. Hakari seems prim and proper on the outside, but is a pervert with her affections towards Rentaro.
1–2	Karane Inda (院田 唐音, Inda Karane)	Miyu Tomita (Japanese); Ariel Graham (English)	Karane is one of Rentaro's first two girlfriends with Hakari Hanazono, as well as one of his classmates in Class 1–4. She has a headstrong personality and is not afraid to speak her mind, wanting to stand up for her friends when they are in trouble. However, Karane acts like a tsundere and often struggles to express her affections for Rentaro.
3	Shizuka Yoshimoto (好本 静, Yoshimoto Shizuka)	Maria Naganawa (Japanese); Sara Ragsdale(English)	Rentaro's third girlfriend, Shizuka is a student librarian in Class 1–4. A timid bookworm, she has difficulties communicating and often expresses herself using phrases from her favorite books. This led to her being bullied by other students and was even abused by her mother before meeting Rentaro. Wanting to help Shizuka open up, Rentaro transcribes her favorite books into a text-to-speech app, allowing her to make eye contact with others while expressing herself.
4	Nano Eiai (栄逢 凪乃, Eiai Nano)	Asami Seto (Japanese); Cassie Ewulu (English)	Rentaro's fourth girlfriend, Nano is one of his classmates in Class 1–4 who is obsessed with living her life as efficiently as possible. She originally saw anything which did not contribute to academic or professional success as meaningless, including emotions and romantic relationships. As a result, Nano has trouble processing her feelings when she first falls in love with Rentaro, throwing her lifestyle into chaos. She is especially close to her classmate, Shizuka Yoshimoto.
5	Kusuri Yakuzen (薬膳 楠莉, Yakuzen Kusuri)	Ayaka Asai (Japanese); Lindsay Sheppard (English)	Rentaro's fifth girlfriend, Kusuri is a third year student at Ohananomitsu High School who is the president of her school's chemistry club. She comes from a family of chemists and specializes in creating various drugs with strange effects when they are consumed. Although Kusuri is 18 years old, she has the physical appearance of an eight-year-old child due to consuming a prototype drug that was supposed to stop her from growing up and make her immortal. Kusuri can return to her teenage appearance using a neutralizing drug, but this is temporary due to the immortality drug's potency. While in her childish state, Kusuri tends to act her age, such as referring to herself in the third person.
6	Hahari Hanazono (花園 羽々里, Hanazono Hahari)	Sumire Uesaka (Japanese); Corey Pettit (English)	Rentaro's sixth girlfriend, Hahari is Hakari's 29-year-old mother who is the wealthy CEO of a large business conglomerate. Hahari was initially against Rentaro's relationship with Hakari due to losing her first love to an illness as a young teenager and sought to break them up to spare her daughter from ever feeling the pain she went through. However, Hahari has a change of heart when she meets Rentaro and sees how sincere his feelings are for her daughter. Hahari loves cute things and sees herself as a mother figure to the other members of the Rentaro Family, with a tendency to spoil them.
7	Kurumi Haraga (原賀 胡桃, Haraga Kurumi)	Amane Shindō (Japanese); Emi Lo (English)	Rentaro's seventh girlfriend, Kurumi is a third-year student of Class 3–2 at Ohananomitsu Middle School. Kurumi enjoys food and has high metabolism, allowing her to eat as much as she wants without gaining weight or suffering from ill health. However, this also causes her to frequently feel hungry, to the point of associating certain foods with ordinary conversation. As a result, she is usually irritable and curt with others, but becomes sweet and kind while eating.
8	Mei Meido (銘戸 芽衣, Meido Mei)	Suzuko Mimori (Japanese); Jessica Peterson (English)	Rentaro's eighth girlfriend, Mei is one of Hahari's maids and is 19 years old. She was abused and abandoned by her biological parents before being discovered by Hahari after the latter found her collapsed outside her mansion. As a result, Mei is loyal to Hahari and will carry out any request made by her without question, even if it means sacrificing herself. She has colorful eyes, but she usually keeps them closed.
9	Iku Sutō (須藤 育, Sutō Iku)	Rie Takahashi (Japanese); Rebecca Chiara Marano (English)	Rentaro's ninth girlfriend who is in the same year as him, Iku is a member of her school's girls baseball team. She is a masochist, finding the pain from physical exhaustion and mental stress to be enjoyable.
10	Mimimi Utsukushisugi (美杉 美々美, Utsukushisugi Mimimi)	Lynn (Japanese); Bryn Apprill (English)	Rentaro's tenth girlfriend, Mimimi is a Class 2–2 student at Ohananomitsu High School who is obsessed with beauty. She strives to make herself as beautiful as possible both inside and out—adopting facial care regimens, working part-time to support her goals, and teaching herself elocution.
11	Meme Kakure (華暮 愛々, Kakure Meme)	Kanon Takao (Japanese); Marianne Bray (English)	Rentaro's eleventh girlfriend in Class 1–4, Meme is a timid girl who goes out of her way to be a "background character", growing her bangs to hide her eyes.
12	Chiyo Īn (伊院 知与, Īn Chiyo)	Kaori Ishihara (Japanese); Lacey Deline (English)	Rentaro's twelfth girlfriend, Chiyo serves as president of Class 1–1 at Ohananomitsu Middle School. Chiyo values tidiness and order, and gets frustrated when she sees anything that is disorganized, feeling compelled to intervene and fix them. Chiyo lost her mother at a young age and was raised solely by her father, Hiro. Despite initially liking the compliments for being responsible, she secretly feels burdened by these high expectations.
13	Nadeshiko Yamato (大和 撫子, Yamato Nadeshiko)	Ayana Taketatsu (Japanese); Maganda Marie (English)	Rentaro's thirteenth girlfriend, Nadeshiko (who calls herself "Nadi-sensei") is a 24-year-old Japanese-language teacher at Ohananomitsu High School, who is hired after her predecessor wins the lottery and resigns. She initially claims to be American until Rentaro deduces that she is actually purely Japanese but obsessed with the United States. Nadeshiko is the eldest daughter of a prestigious family and was expected to follow Japanese traditions, such as wearing a kimono as well as learning to play the koto. She speaks a mix of Japanese and broken English in the anime, but carries a southern accent in the English dub.
14	Yamame Yasashiki (優敷 山女, Yasashiki Yamame)	Hana Tamegai (Japanese); Mikaela Krantz (English)	Rentaro's fourteenth girlfriend, Yamame is Iku Sutō's classmate from Class 1–3 who is a member of her school's gardening club. She speaks with a prominent Hokkaido dialect (in the English dub, a Minnesota accent). While a gentle and caring girl, she is very tall for her age and has developed a complex over it due to childhood bullying. As a result, she gravitated towards nature and animals, and is so close to them that she is effectively a friend of nature.
15	Momiji Momi (茂見 紅葉, Momi Momiji)	Aoi Koga (Japanese); Molly Zhang (English)	Rentaro's fifteenth girlfriend, Momiji is a student of Class 3–2 at Ohananomitsu Middle School and Kurumi Haraga's classmate. She is a skilled masseuse who leaves her "clients" (other students) in extreme bliss. Momiji enjoys the softness of female bodies, and as "payment" will often cop a feel of women after massaging them. Her goal is to become a professional masseuse for gravure idols.
16	Yaku Yakuzen (薬膳 ヤク, Yakuzen Yaku)	Rie Kugimiya (Japanese); Jad Saxton (English)	Rentaro's sixteenth girlfriend, Yaku is Kusuri Yakuzen's maternal grandmother. She is 89 years old, but has the physical appearance of an eight-year-old girl due to ingesting a more potent version of her family's proprietary immortality drug. Yaku is also a widow and met her first husband in a warzone where she was serving as a combat medic. Due to her advanced age, Yaku acts more mature towards Rentaro and the other members of the Rentaro Family. She ends her sentences with an antiquated version of her granddaughter's verbal word nanoja (なのじゃ).
17	Kishika Torotoro (土呂瀞 騎士華, Torotoro Kishika)	Yumika Yano (Japanese); KyLeigh Zimmerer (English)	Rentaro's seventeenth girlfriend, Kishika is a third year student at Ohananomitsu High School who serves as captain of her school's kendo team. She is also Kusuri Yakuzen's classmate. As a martial artist, she abides by a code of chivalry and stands up for others who need assistance. However, Kishika's secret desire is to be pampered, so she will "melt" when her head is patted.
18	Āshī Kedarui (毛樽井 亜愛子衣, Kedarui Āshī)	—N/a	Rentaro's eighteenth girlfriend, Āshī is in the same year as him. She is a gyaru who normally wears flashy clothes, uses slang terms in her speech, and addresses her family and friends by nicknames. Āshī also prefers to be addressed by the nickname "Ahko" (亜愛子, Āko). She has low blood pressure, resulting in her having a relaxed expression even when feeling strong emotions like excitement or sadness.
19	Uto Nakaji (中二 詩人, Nakaji Uto)	—N/a	Rentaro's nineteenth girlfriend, Uto is a second-year student at Ohananomitsu Middle School. She is a chūnibyō who sees herself as a "wandering bard". Uto dresses the part in a green hat and mantle and plays the ocarina, albeit terribly. She also tends to talk in poems, using roundabout dialogue, sophistry, or Socratic method.
20	Mai Meido (女井戸 妹, Meido Mai)	—N/a	Rentaro's 20th girlfriend, Mai is the same age as him and works as a junior live-in maid at the Hanazono Mansion. The granddaughter of the estate's previous head maid, she was inspired to become a maid herself after following her grandmother to work and watching Mei Meido carrying out her duties. Mai idolizes Mei, seeing her as an honorary older sister under the same employer, thus hates Rentaro for causing Mei to fall for him.
21	Momoha Bon'nōji (盆能寺 百八, Bon'nōji Momoha)	—N/a	Rentaro's 21st girlfriend, Momoha is a 27-year-old social studies teacher at Ohananomitsu High School. She lives in an untidy tent on school grounds, is addicted to drinking and gambling, and is a pervert at the same level as the Hanazono family.
22	Rin Baio (灰尾 凛, Baio Rin)	—N/a	Rentaro's 22nd girlfriend, Rin is a second year student at Ohananomitsu Middle School who is Uto Nakaji's classmate. Because her parents are concert violinists, she has been practicing the instrument for a long time. After watching Resident Evil as a kid, she has developed an obsession for depictions of violence.
23	Sū Hifumi (一二三 数, Hifumi Sū)	—N/a	Rentaro's 23rd girlfriend and Āshī Kedarui's classmate from Class 1–1. Sū is obsessed with numbers, to the point of declaring that she is in love with them, seeing them as unique and sentient beings.
24	Eira Kaho (火保 エイラ, Kaho Eira)	—N/a	Rentaro's 24th girlfriend, Eira is a sophomore at Ohananomitsu University. She is a half-Brazilian capoeira practitioner, having learned the martial art from her father, who works as an instructor and has his own academy. Eira tends to defend herself from threats by attempting to kick them, but is terrified of things she cannot kick due to them being socially unacceptable to kick.
25	Tama Nekonari (猫成 珠, Nekonari Tama)	—N/a	Rentaro's 25th girlfriend, Tama is a 21-year-old former office worker who has adopted the persona and appearance of a catgirl. She quit her job due to being dissatisfied with her work and decided to become a cat after seeing that they did not have to work. After meeting Rentaro, Tama spends the afternoon being pampered by him.
26	Himeka Saiki (才奇 姫歌, Saiki Himeka)	—N/a	Rentaro's 26th girlfriend who is in the same year as him. Himeka is a professional singer who goes by the stage name "Kiki" (奇姫, Kiki). Rentaro encounters her when she is practicing her singing in a remote bathroom on the campus. Himeka is a musical prodigy popular among those her age, but has a desire to be seen as abnormal, believing that abnormal geniuses are much cooler and stand out more.
27	Matsuri Dei (出井 祭李, Dei Matsuri)	—N/a	Rentaro's 27th girlfriend and Chiyo Īn's classmate in Class 1–1 of Ohananomitsu Middle School. Matsuri is half-British, as her mother comes from England. Both of her parents are fashion designers, specializing in the Gothic Lolita style, and she wears their designs as her everyday clothing. Matsuri lives with her grandparents due to her parents being overseas for work. Her grandparents sell yakisoba at festivals, and she regularly helps them out at their stand. Despite her prim and proper appearance, Matsuri speaks in the rough Shitamachi dialect associated with the working-class of Tokyo, and has a habit of rolling her sleeves up to her shoulders.
28	Shīna Usami (宇佐美 椎奈, Usami Shīna)	—N/a	Rentaro's 28th girlfriend, Shīna is a second-year student at Ohananomitsu High School (in Class 2–6). She has severe autophobia, feeling lonely simply, and has difficulty doing most things on her own (such as going to the bathroom). She is also afraid of empty spaces and singular objects, preferring to see objects crammed together or tightly packed instead.
29	Meru Zetsubōda (雪房田 夢留, Zetsubōda Meru)	—N/a	Rentaro's 29th girlfriend and Himeka Saiki's classmate in Class 1–6. Meru is an author and illustrator specializing in fairytales and has published several books. However, despite the innocent nature of her work, she has a gloomy appearance and talks in a despairing manner, which stems from her being bullied in middle school. Meru dedicated herself to understanding other people and how they would suffer misfortune or commit malicious acts against others, resulting in her coming to the conclusion that the world was irredeemable.
30	Saki Tomogara (輩 先, Tomogara Saki)	—N/a	Rentaro's 30th girlfriend, a third-year student in Class 3–2 of Ohananomitsu High School. She intentionally held herself back a school year just so she could stake her claim as the oldest student and act like the unofficial shadow banchō (delinquent boss). Though whenever she meets someone older than her, she drops her boss act and attempts to serve them as a faithful subordinate.
31	Nemu Nemui (根向井 寧夢, Nemui Nemu)	—N/a	Rentaro's 31st girlfriend who is a second-year student at Ohananomitsu Middle School. Nemu is perpetually sleepy, and is lethargic most of the time despite getting ample sleep. Nemu can fall asleep extremely easily, and is a sleepwalker. While asleep, she can interact with her surroundings and engage in activities, and remembers these events as a lucid dream upon waking up.
32	Hasuha Hasu (端須 蓮葉, Hasu Hasuha)	—N/a	Rentaro's 32nd girlfriend who is Iku and Yamame's classmate from Class 1–3. Hasuha believes herself to be a great detective, having helped her classmates solve mysteries in elementary school, and dresses in a deerstalker hat and cape. Rentaro first met her in the hallway, when another schoolmate of theirs loses her thermal underwear and he is suspected of taking them. Hasuha has a powerful sense of smell, and can elicit information about events and objects simply by smelling them. She comes to fall in love with Rentaro and his scent, and after he saves her from falling to the floor (holding her close to him in the process), she confesses her feelings, and Rentaro accepts her into the family.
33	Kimari Morikita (守北 季鞠, Morikita Kimari)	—N/a	Rentaro's 33rd girlfriend, Kimari is a 27-year-old student guidance counselor and a civics teacher at Ohananomitsu High School. The daughter of a judge and a police officer, Kimari was raised to always follow rules, and has a reputation for being very strict. Rentaro meets her after she calls him to the counselling room to see her, regarding his relationships with multiple girls on campus. Despite her demeanor, Kimari has a subconscious desire to break rules, due to suppressing her personal desires for so long. She finally breaks a rule after Rentaro confesses to her and kisses her, and becomes more tolerant of students breaking minor rules as long as they do not inconvenience others (feeling both guilty and excited in the process).
34	Eru Futate (双天 彗流, Futate Eru)	—N/a	Eru is Rentaro's 34th girlfriend. She is a first year at Ohananomitsu Middle School, and Chiyo and Matsuri's classmate in Class 1–1. Eru is a fashionista, and is especially proud of her long hair, which she styles into twintails. Rentaro first meets her when she bumps into him on the street, distracted while playing with her hair. Eru believes that she looks her best when her hair is in twintails, and dislikes it when people attempt to tell her that she does not need them to look beautiful. When one of her hair ties breaks, Rentaro sacrifices his jacket to create a makeshift hair tie for her. She then confesses her feelings to him, believing him to be the ideal person to form a couple with.
35	Chiyu Jiai (慈相千優, Jiai Chiyu)	—N/a	Chiyu is Rentaro's 35th girlfriend. Chiyu is 25 years old when introduced, and is the nurse at Ohananomitsu High School. Rentaro first meets her when he sustains an injury, and visits the infirmary to have it treated. Chiyu has a gentle, compassionate bedside manner which reassures the people she treats, and always has a gentle smile. However, she tends to get angry at whatever has caused her patient harm, which shows as anger marks on her face and forehead.
36	Kogoe Mishiro (三白 小々枝, Mishiro Kogoe)	—N/a	Kogoe is Rentaro's 36th girlfriend, and one of his classmates in Class 1–4. Kogoe is especially sensitive to cold weather, wearing thick winter clothing (even while indoors) and keeping a supply of heating pads in her locker. She is also soft-spoken, as speaking up causes her to lose body heat. Prior to her introduction, Kogoe had been absent from school due to constantly feeling too cold to get out of bed. Rentaro notices her on her first day back at school, and then makes eye contact with her in the hallway outside his classroom. Kogoe was also born with sanpaku (三白) eyes, and grew her hair out to avoid intimidating others with her gaze. Rentaro later reassures Kogoe that he loves her eyes, and she cuts her hair to reveal them.
37	Rana Fushida (伏田 蘭那, Fushida Rana)	—N/a	Rentaro's 37th girlfriend—the president of Class 3–2 at Ohananomitsu Middle School, and Kurumi and Momiji's classmate. A precocious girl, Rana is Momiji's childhood friend, and she often competes with her in areas such as academics and sports, with the winner being allowed to fondle the loser's breasts. Rana has never been able to defeat Momiji, and thus has always been on the receiving end of the fondling. This has resulted in her developing an especially voluptuous and curvy body for her age, and being stereotyped as morally loose and lewd as a result. However, Rana is actually strait-laced and sincere, and takes great pains not to appear lewd, albeit with great difficulty.
38	Suimu Nuremi (濡海 水舞, Nuremi Suimu)	—N/a	Rentaro's 38th girlfriend. She is a third year student at Ohananomitsu High School in Class 3–5, who serves as president of her school's swimming club.

=== Other characters ===
Asakawa (浅川)
Voiced by: Satomi Amano
Asakawa is Rentaro's 100th and final romantic rejection; he confesses to her on their last day of middle school and is immediately turned down.
Anonymous Friend "A" (友人A, Yūjin A)
Voiced by: Misuzu Yamada (Japanese); Brittney Karbowski (English)
Rentaro's friend up until they graduated from middle school.
The God of Love (神様, Kamisama; lit. 'God')
Voiced by: Shigeru Chiba (Japanese); Kenny James (English)
The god of a local shrine who informs Rentaro that due to his constant prayers to his shrine and him being distracted while watching Castle in the Sky. He blessed Rentaro to meet 100 soulmates during his high school life.
An Baba (馬場 杏, Baba An)
Voiced by: Kujira (Japanese); Barry Yandell (English)
The vice-principal at high school, An has a bizarre appearance and is known for chasing down students who behave badly in school, often punishing male students with sloppy kisses. She tends to run on all fours terribly and owes her speed to her history as an athlete.
Gorilla Alliance (呉莉羅連合, Gorira Rengō)
Leader: Voiced by: Kimiko Saitō (Japanese); Lexi Nieto (English)
Members: Voiced by: Risa Tsumugi and Hibiki Kuroki (Japanese); Ricco Fajardo and Bradley Gareth (English)
Yuu-kun: Voiced by: Yuki Sakakihara (Japanese); Katie Wetch (English)
A Japanese biker gang formed in the early 21st century led by a burly woman who resembles a gorilla. The leader is soulmates with a petite boy named Yuu-kun whom she saved from a speeding car and fell in love with during the incident.
Kaoru Hanazono (花園 香, Hanazono Kaoru)
Voiced by: Akira Ishida (Japanese); Drew Breedlove (English)
A boy with a terminal illness, whom Hahari fell in love with as a young schoolgirl. Wanting to preserve his memory, Hahari had herself artificially inseminated with his sperm at the age of 13, which led to the birth of Hakari. Rentaro meets his spirit after rescuing Hakari and causing Hahari to fall in love with him. After meeting in Heaven, he introduces himself to Chiyo's mother, and the two decide to give him the Hanazono surname. His house is filled to the brim with Hahari and Hakari merchandise, as he is a massive fan of the series.
Hirotsugu Īn (伊院 拾二, Īn Hirotsugu) (né Aijō (愛城))
Voiced by: Shin-ichiro Miki^{Ep. 25 credits} (Japanese); Marcus Stimac (English)
Hirotsugu is Chiyo's father, Chiri's husband, and Rentaro's uncle who is also known as "Uncle Hiro". Hirotsugu approves of Chiyo's relationship with Rentaro despite them being cousins, as Rentaro had saved him from being hit by a speeding tanker truck as a child. He works as a web designer and is afraid of dogs.
Chiri Īn (伊院 知莉, Īn Chiri)
Chiri was Chiyo's mother, Hirotsugu's wife, and Rentaro's aunt. She met Hiro during university in middle school and developed feelings for him after the latter saved her from an obsessive stalker. Prior to the series, Chiri died from unknown causes, leaving Hiro to raise their daughter as a single father.
Haruhiko Yakuzen (薬膳 春彦, Yakuzen Haruhiko) (né Yakumaru (薬丸))
Voiced by: Mutsumi Tamura^{Ep. 31 credits} (8-year old), Tomokazu Sugita^{Ep. 31 credits} (adult) (Japanese); Corinne Sudberg (8-year old) (English)
Haruhiko is Kusuri's father, Yomogi's husband, and Yaku's son-in-law. Haruhiko is a pharmaceutical researcher and chemist, and met Yomogi at his workplace. He specialised in body-augmenting steroids which could increase muscle mass and physical strength, at the cost of changing his appearance into a monstrous form. After Yomogi is kidnapped by a corporate spy, Haruhiko consumes a version of his muscle growth drug which permanently transforms his body to rescue her. Yomogi then confesses her feelings for him, and the two get married soon after, with Haruhiko taking his wife's family name. At some point prior to the series, Haruhiko and his wife consumed a prototype of their family's immortality drug, causing their bodies to regress to that of an eight-year-old child.
Yomogi Yakuzen (薬膳 蓬, Yakuzen Yomogi)
Voiced by: Yuka Iguchi^{Ep. 31 credits} (Japanese); Meg McClain (English)
Yomogi is Kusuri's mother, Haruhiko's wife, and Yaku's daughter. Like the other members of her family, she is a pharmaceutical researcher and chemist and met Haruhiko at her workplace. Yomogi was especially skilled at her work, with many of her colleagues wanting to date her, but rejected all of them to concentrate on her work. After being kidnapped by a corporate spy and being rescued by an augmented Haruhiko, she confessed her feelings for him, leading them to get married. At one point prior to the series, Yomogi and her husband consumed a prototype of their family's immortality drug, causing their bodies to regress to that of an eight-year-old child.
Isahito Yakuzen (薬膳 軍人, Yakuzen Isahito)
Isahito is Kusuri's grandfather, Haruhiko's father-in-law, Yomogi's father, and Yaku's husband. He is a former soldier, and in a certain war, he met his wife Yaku, who was serving as a combat medic. He died before Kusuri invented the immortality drug.
Shiori Yoshimoto (好本 静織, Yoshimoto Shiori)
Voiced by: Madoka Yonezawa (Japanese); Kara Edwards (English)
Shizuka's mother. Due to her difficulties with verbal communication, she frequently abused her daughter. Later, she confiscated her phone after finding out that she was using a text-to-speech app to communicate. After Rentaro confronts her about this, Shiori returns Shizuka's phone and begins working toward building a better relationship with her daughter.

== Media ==
=== Manga ===
Written by Rikito Nakamura and illustrated by Yukiko Nozawa, The 100 Girlfriends Who Really, Really, Really, Really, Really Love You started in Shueisha's seinen manga magazine Weekly Young Jump on December 26, 2019. On February 19, 2026, Nozawa announced that serialization pacing of the manga would slow down due to her maternity leave after the birth of her new child and that she plans to gradually return to the original serialization pacing as her health allows. Its chapters are collected and published by Shueisha into individual tankōbon volumes. The first volume was released on April 17, 2020. As of September 17, 2026, 27 volumes have been released.

On July 2, 2021, Seven Seas Entertainment announced they licensed the series for English publication in North America in print and on digital platforms in single volume editions. The first volume was released on February 22, 2022.

=== Anime ===
An anime television series adaptation was announced in March 2023. It is produced by Bibury Animation Studios and directed by Hikaru Sato, with scripts supervised by Takashi Aoshima, character designs handled by Akane Yano, and music composed by Shuhei Mutsuki, Shunsuke Takizawa, and Eba. Its first 12-episode season aired from October 8 to December 24, 2023, on Tokyo MX and other networks. The opening theme song is "Dai Dai Dai Dai Daisuki na Kimi e" (大大大大大好きな君へ♡; lit. 'To You Who I Really, Really, Really, Really, Really Love'), performed by Kaede Hondo, Miyu Tomita, Maria Naganawa, Asami Seto, and Ayaka Asai, while the ending theme song is "Sweet Sign" (スイートサイン, Suīto Sain), performed by Nako Misaki.

Following the end of the first season, a second season was announced. It aired for 12 episodes from January 12 to March 30, 2025. The opening theme song is "Arigato, Daisuki ni Natte Kurete" (ありがと、大好きになってくれて; lit. 'Thanks, for Loving Me Much'), performed by Rentaro Family, a unit formed by the cast members of the heroines from the series's two seasons. The ending theme song is "Unmei?" (lit. 'Destiny?'), performed by Amane Shindō, Suzuko Mimori, Rie Takahashi, Lynn, and Kanon Takao.

A third season was announced in October 2025. It aired for 12 episodes from July 5 to September 20, 2026. The opening theme song is "Daisuki Zutto Eien Ni" (大好き♡ずっと永遠に♡; lit. 'I Love You Always and Forever'), and the ending theme song is "Kitare Koi Itare Ai" (来れ恋・至れ愛; lit. 'Come, Love; Reach, Love'), both performed by Rentaro Family.

Crunchyroll streams the series outside of Asia. Muse Communication has licensed the series in South and Southeast Asia.

=== Light novel ===
A spin-off light novel written by Hamubane, titled The 100 Girlfriends Who Really, Really, Really, Really, Really Love You: Secret Love Story was released under Shueisha's Jump J-Books light novel imprint on July 19, 2023. Seven Seas Entertainment licensed the light novel for English publication. It was released digitally on October 3, 2024, and was released in print on November 12 of the same year.

== Reception ==
By July 2021, the manga had over 800,000 copies in circulation. By March 2022, it had 1 million copies in circulation. By November 2023, it had over 1.65 million copies in circulation. By July 2026, it had over 3 million copies in circulation.

In August 2020, the series ranked second out of the 50 nominees on the sixth Next Manga Award, with 19,902 votes. The series ranked 19th on the 2021 Shinkan Manga Taishō by Tokyo Manga Reviewers.

The series ranked eighth on AnimeJapan's fifth "Most Wanted Anime Adaptation" poll in 2022. The anime was named by Guinness World Records as containing the "Longest Speech in Japanese Animation", with 7,453 words spoken by Rentaro Aijo.
