= List of The Quintessential Quintuplets episodes =

The logo of the anime series

The Quintessential Quintuplets, also known as 5-Tōbun no Hanayome, is an anime television series based on the manga series of the same name written and illustrated by Negi Haruba. The anime series is licensed in North America under Crunchyroll-Funimation partnership.

The first 12-episode anime television series adaptation was announced in the combined 36th and 37th issue of Weekly Shōnen Magazine on August 8, 2018. The series was directed by Satoshi Kuwabara and written by Keiichirō Ōchi, featuring animation by Tezuka Productions, character designs by Michinosuke Nakamura and Gagakuga, and music by Natsumi Tabuchi, Hanae Nakamura, and Miki Sakurai. The series premiered from January 10 to March 28, 2019, on TBS, BS-TBS and SUN. Crunchyroll streamed the series with Funimation providing the English dub.

On May 5, 2019, a second season, the title of which is styled as The Quintessential Quintuplets ∬, was announced. Kaori replaced Satoshi Kuwabara as the season's new director, and Keiichirō Ōchi returned to write the scripts. Bibury Animation Studios replaced Tezuka Productions as the season's new animation studio. It aired from January 8 to March 26, 2021.

== Series overview ==
Season	Episodes	Originally released	
Season	Episodes	First released	Last released
1	12	January 10, 2019	March 28, 2019
2	12	January 8, 2021	March 26, 2021
Movie	1	May 20, 2022	
SP	2	September 2, 2023 (Note: Had an early limited theatrical release as a single film on July 14, 2023.)	September 9, 2023
SP	2	December 24, 2024 (Note: Had an early limited theatrical release as a single film on September 20, 2024.)	

== Episodes ==
=== The Quintessential Quintuplets (2019) ===
Story	Episode	Title (Note: All English titles are taken from Crunchyroll.)	Directed by	Written by	Storyboarded by	Original release date	Ref.
1	1	"The Quintessential Quintuplets"; Transliteration: "Go-tōbun no Hanayome" (Japanese: 五等分の花嫁)	Yasuo Iwamoto	Keiichirō Ōchi	Satoshi Kuwabara	January 10, 2019	
2	2	"Rooftop Confession"; Transliteration: "Okujō no kokuhaku" (Japanese: 屋上の告白)	Fumio Maezono	Keiichirō Ōchi	Satoshi Kuwabara	January 17, 2019	
3	3	"A Mountain of Problems"; Transliteration: "Mondai wa yamadzumi" (Japanese: 問題は山積み)	Yorifusa Yamaguchi	Keiichirō Ōchi	Satoshi Kuwabara	January 24, 2019	
4	4	"Day Off"; Transliteration: "Kyō wa o yasumi" (Japanese: 今日はお休み)	Satoshi Kuwabara	Mayumi Morita	Minoru Yamaoka	January 31, 2019	
5	5	"Five Fifths"; Transliteration: "Zen'in de go-tōbun" (Japanese: 全員で五等分)	Fumio Maezono	Mayumi Morita	Satoshi Kuwabara; Kasumi Hasuo	February 7, 2019	
6	6	"What's Been Built Up"; Transliteration: "Tsumiageta mono" (Japanese: 積み上げたもの)	Yuuki Morita	Keiichirō Ōchi	Satoshi Kuwabara	February 14, 2019	
7	7	"Liar McLieface"; Transliteration: "Usotsuki usotarou" (Japanese: 嘘つき嘘たろう)	Fumihiro Yoshimura	Keiichirō Ōchi	Satoshi Kuwabara	February 21, 2019	
8	8	"The Photo that Started It All"; Transliteration: "Hajimari no shashin" (Japanese: 始まりの写真)	Ryou Miyata	Keiichirō Ōchi	Minoru Yamaoka	February 28, 2019	
9	9	"Legend of Fate Day 1"; Transliteration: "Musubi no densetsu Ichinichime" (Japanese: 結びの伝説 1日目)	Takayuki Chiba	Mayumi Morita	Satoshi Kuwabara	March 7, 2019	
10	10	"Legend of Fate Day 2"; Transliteration: "Musubi no densetsu Futsukame" (Japanese: 結びの伝説 2日目)	Takuo Suzuki	Mayumi Morita	Minoru Yamaoka	March 14, 2019	
11	11	"Legend of Fate Day 3"; Transliteration: "Musubi no densetsu Mikkame" (Japanese: 結びの伝説 3日目)	Midori Yoshizawa	Keiichirō Ōchi	Satoshi Kuwabara	March 21, 2019	
12	12	"Legend of Fate Day 2000"; Transliteration: "Musubi no densetsu 2000-nichime" (Japanese: 結びの伝説 2000日目)	Fumihiro Yoshimura	Keiichirō Ōchi	Satoshi Kuwabara	March 28, 2019	

=== The Quintessential Quintuplets 2 (2021) ===
Story	Episode	Title (Note: All English titles are taken from Crunchyroll.)	Directed by	Written by	Storyboarded by	Original release date	Ref.
13	1	"Quite the Crappy Kyoto Quagmire"; Transliteration: "Kyō to Kyōto no Kyō to Tomo" (Japanese: 今日と京都の凶と共)	Kaori	Keiichirō Ōchi	Kaori	January 8, 2021	
14	2	"Seven Goodbyes Part 1"; Transliteration: "Nanatsu no Sayonara Daiisshō" (Japanese: 七つのさよなら 第一章)	Yūichirō Aoki; Ippei Ichii	Keiichirō Ōchi	Taizō Yoshida	January 15, 2021	
15	3	"Seven Goodbyes Part 2"; Transliteration: "Nanatsu no Sayonara Dainishō" (Japanese: 七つのさよなら 第二章)	Shigeru Kimiya	Keiichirō Ōchi	Ryōma Mizuno	January 22, 2021	
16	4	"Seven Goodbyes Part 3"; Transliteration: "Nanatsu no Sayonara Daisanshō" (Japanese: 七つのさよなら 第三章)	Kento Shintani	Keiichirō Ōchi	Kaori; Kento Shintani	January 29, 2021	
17	5	"Good Work Today"; Transliteration: "Kyō wa Otsukare" (Japanese: 今日はお疲れ)	Yūichirō Aoki	Keiichirō Ōchi	Kaori; Ryōma Mizuno	February 5, 2021	
18	6	"The Last Exam"; Transliteration: "Saigo no Shiken" (Japanese: 最後の試験)	Mitsutaka Noshitani	Keiichirō Ōchi	Kaori; Mitsutaka Noshitani	February 12, 2021	
19	7	"Begin the Offensive"; Transliteration: "Kōryaku Kaishi" (Japanese: 攻略開始)	Ippei Ichii	Keiichirō Ōchi	Taizō Yoshida	February 19, 2021	
20	8	"Scrambled Eggs"; Transliteration: "Sukuranburu Eggu" (Japanese: スクランブルエッグ)	Takayuki Kitagawa	Keiichirō Ōchi	Ikurō Morimoto	February 26, 2021	
21	9	"Welcome to Class 3-1"; Transliteration: "Yōkoso San Nen Ichi Kumi" (Japanese: ようこそ3年1組)	Kazuomi Koga	Keiichirō Ōchi	Taizō Yoshida	March 5, 2021	
22	10	"Five Cranes in Return"; Transliteration: "Gowazuru no Ongaeshi" (Japanese: 五羽鶴の恩返し)	Yoshihisa Matsumoto	Keiichirō Ōchi	Taizō Yoshida	March 12, 2021	
23	11	"Sisters War: Part 1"; Transliteration: "Shisutāzu Wō Zenhan Sen" (Japanese: シスターズウォー 前半戦)	Akiko Seki	Keiichirō Ōchi	Ikurō Morimoto	March 19, 2021	
24	12	"Sisters War: Part 2"; Transliteration: "Shisutāzu Wō Kōhan Sen" (Japanese: シスターズウォー 後半戦)	Kaori	Keiichirō Ōchi	Kaori	March 26, 2021	

== Movie ==
Title	Directed by (Note: Unit directors (演出), the same credit used for "episode directors".)	Written by	Storyboarded by	Original release date
"The Quintessential Quintuplets Movie" Transliteration: "Eiga Go-Tōbun no Hanayome" (Japanese: 映画 五等分の花嫁)	Hiroshi Hara; Takahiro Hirata; Yoshitsugu Kimura; Ryuuta Yamamoto; Taichi Yoshizawa; Kiyoshi Mefu	Keiichirō Ōchi	Ikurō Morimoto; Takeshi Ninomiya; Takuya Satō; Taizō Yoshida; Tōru Harumizu; Kiyoshi Mefu	May 20, 2022

== Specials ==
=== The Quintessential Quintuplets∽ (2023) ===
Episode	Title (Note: All English titles are taken from Crunchyroll.)	Directed by	Written by	Storyboarded by	Original release date	Ref.
1	"No Coincidences in This Summer Break (Part 1)"; Transliteration: "Gūzen no Nai Natsuyasumi (Zenpen)" (Japanese: 偶然のない夏休み・前編)	Kōji Matsumura	Keiichirō Ōchi	Kōji Matsumura	September 2, 2023	
Futaro, Ichika, Nino, Miku, Yotsuba, and Itsuki spend the night at the library. The next day, Futaro visits his boss at the hospital, spends time with Raiha at the beach, and accompanies Oda's daughter, Kiku at the apartment. Some time later, Futaro invites the girls for summer vacation.
2	"No Coincidences in This Summer Break (Part 2)"; Transliteration: "Gūzen no Nai Natsuyasumi (Kōhen)" (Japanese: 偶然のない夏休み・後編)	Yukihiro Miyamoto	Keiichirō Ōchi	Midori Yoshizawa	September 9, 2023	
Futaro and the girls spend the day at the water park. Back at school, Yotsuba notices about Futaro and Ichika finds a paper sheet for the school festival.

=== The Quintessential Quintuplets* (2024) ===
Episode	Title (Note: All English titles are taken from Crunchyroll.)	Directed by	Written by	Storyboarded by	Original release date	Ref.
1	"Operation Quintuplets (Part 1)"; Transliteration: "Itsutsu-ko-chan Daijigen" (Japanese: 五つ子ちゃん大事件)	Masayuki Matsumoto	Masato Jinbo	Motohiro Abe	December 24, 2024	TBA
Futaro, Maruo, and the girls travel to Hawaii. While spending a few days there, the girls meet Lily, a female native Hawaiian speaking English. Futaro gets intoxicated with wine while accompanying Maruo, but he recovers himself after being found by the girls.
2	"Operation Quintuplets (Part 2)"; Transliteration: "Itsutsu-ko-chan Dai Sakusen" (Japanese: 五つ子ちゃん大作戦)	Noriaki Akitaya	Masato Jinbo	Motohiro Abe	December 24, 2024	TBA
The girls introduce Lily to Futaro on the last day of their vacation. After returning to Japan, the girls move on separately for work, while Futaro meets his grandparents. Some time later, Futaro accompanies Yotsuba.
