= Nakano =

Nakano may refer to:

- Nakano, Tokyo
- Nakano, Nagano
- Nakano (surname)
- Nakano Corporation

== See also ==
- Nakano Station (disambiguation)
