= Nakano (surname) =

Nakano (written: 中野) is a Japanese surname. Notable people with the surname include:

- Ayako Nakano (dancer) (中野 綾子; born 1977), Japanese ballerina
- Ayako Nakano (swimmer) (中野 亜弥子; born 1973), Japanese swimmer
- Daisuke Nakano, Japanese gymnast
- Eiji Nakano, film actor (1904–1990)
- Emiko Nakano (1925–1990), American abstract expressionist painter and printmaker, fashion Illustrator
- George Nakano, retired American politician
- Hideki Nakano (中野 秀樹; born 1952), Japanese Nordic combined skier
- Hidemitsu Nakano, army general (1890–1982)
- Hiroko Nakano, Japanese politician
- Hiroyuki Nakano, film director
- Junya Nakano, video game composer
- Kansei Nakano, Japanese politician
- Kanta Nakano (中野寛太; born 2000), Japanese judoka
- Katsuya Nakano (中野 克哉; born 1996), Japanese footballer
- Kei Nakano (中野 圭; born 1988), Japanese footballer
- Keiko Nakano, golfer and former professional wrestler as Bull Nakano
- Koichi Nakano, retired cyclist
- Koji Nakano (disambiguation), multiple people
- Kiyoshi Nakano, Japanese politician
- Kumiko Nakano, actress
- Madoka Nakano (中野 円花; born 1991), Japanese long-distance runner
- Mari Nakano, Japanese member of the World Scout Committee
- Masashi Nakano, Japanese politician
- Midori Nakano, magazine columnist
- Minoru Nakano (中野 稔; born 1936), Japanese ice hockey player
- Ryotaro Nakano (born 1988), Japanese footballer
- Ryuen Nakano, the pen name of Shizuki Tadao (1760–1806), Japanese astronomer and translator
- Satoru Nakano (中野 悟; born 1947), Japanese swimmer
- Seigō Nakano, fascist politician (1886–1943)
- Shinji Nakano, auto racer
- Shogo Nakano (中野 翔吾; born 1997), Japanese rugby union player
- Shinya Nakano, retired motorcycle racer
- Syuichi Nakano, astronomer
- Tadaharu Nakano (中野 忠晴; 1909–1970), Japanese musician
- Nakano Takeko, female warrior (1847–1868)
- Tam Nakano (中野 たむ; born 1988), Japanese professional wrestler
- Tatsuo Nakano (中野龍雄; born 1965), Japanese professional wrestler
- Teruyoshi Nakano, special effects director
- Tsutomu Nakano, retired freestyle swimmer
- Yonosuke Nakano, religious leader and philanthropist (1887–1974)
- Yoshihiro Nakano (中野 嘉大; born 1993), Japanese footballer
- Yoshio Nakano, professional poker player
- Yukari Nakano, retired figure skater

== Fictional characters ==
- Azusa "Azu-nyan" Nakano, a character in the anime/manga series K-On!
- Hiroshi Nakano, a character in the anime/manga series Gravitation
- Any of the 5 following sisters in the anime/manga series The Quintessential Quintuplets, their father Maruo Nakano or their mother Rena Nakano:
  - Ichika Nakano
  - Nino Nakano
  - Miku Nakano
  - Yotsuba Nakano
  - Itsuki Nakano
