= The Quintessential Quintuplets Movie =

2022 Japanese animated film by Masato Jinbo

- Theatrical release poster
- Kanji: 映画 五等分の花嫁
- Revised Hepburn: Eiga Go-Tōbun no Hanayome
- Directed by: Masato Jinbo
- Screenplay by: Keiichirō Ōchi
- Based on: The Quintessential Quintuplets by Negi Haruba
- Produced by: Junichiro Tanaka; Tomoki Ueda; Makoto Furukawa; Tomoyuki Ōwada; Gōta Aijima; Mitsutoshi Ogura; Yūichi Izumi; Kento Yoshida
- Starring: Yoshitsugu Matsuoka; Kana Hanazawa; Ayana Taketatsu; Miku Itō; Ayane Sakura; Inori Minase
- Cinematography: Daisuke Chiba
- Edited by: Mutsumi Takemiya
- Music by: Hanae Nakamura; Miki Sakurai
- Production company: Bibury Animation Studios
- Distributed by: Pony Canyon
- Release date: May 20, 2022
- Running time: 136 minutes
- Country: Japan
- Language: Japanese
- Box office: US$18.4 million

The Quintessential Quintuplets Movie (Japanese: 映画 五等分の花嫁, Hepburn: Eiga Go-Tōbun no Hanayome) is a 2022 Japanese animated romantic comedy film based on the manga series The Quintessential Quintuplets by Negi Haruba and a sequel to the 2019–2021 anime television series adaptation. Produced by Bibury Animation Studios and distributed by Pony Canyon, the film is directed by Masato Jinbo from a script written by Keiichirō Ōchi, adapting the 11th to 14th volumes of the original manga, and stars Yoshitsugu Matsuoka, Kana Hanazawa, Ayana Taketatsu, Miku Itō, Ayane Sakura, and Inori Minase. In the film, Futaro Uesugi plans to confess his love to one of the Nakano quintuplets during their final school festival.

A continuation of the anime series was announced in March 2021, followed by the confirmation of the project as a film in April. The cast and staff for the film were revealed in October and December 2021, respectively.

The Quintessential Quintuplets Movie was released in Japan on May 20, 2022. The film has grossed over $18 million worldwide and received nominations at the Newtype Anime Awards.

== Plot ==
Following their summer vacation, Futaro Uesugi and the Nakano quintuplets Ichika, Nino, Miku, Yotsuba, and Itsuki, now third-year high school students, prepare for the upcoming school festival. On the day of the festival, Futaro invites the quintuplets to a room and confesses his love to them, but he tells them to wait until the end of the festival to know whom he has chosen among them. During her acting work on the second day of the festival, Ichika learns that one of her sisters collapsed and rushes to a hospital, where she sees Futaro and Nino visiting. Ichika strolls outside with Futaro, during which she kisses him at a park. On the second day of the festival, Nino is expecting the quintuplets' father Maruo to visit the school but is unable to find him among the crowd. Futaro approaches her with a video confirming Mauro's attendance. Nino and Futaro visit Mauro in the hospital, where she cooks a pancake for him. After the successful meeting, Nino kisses Futaro and thanks her father for choosing him as the quintuplets' tutor.

On the first day of the festival, Miku is accompanied by Futaro in approaching the boys' takoyaki stand, where she promises that the girls supporting the pancake stand are going to enjoy their food. Later, Miku returns to the stand with the girls but finds the place on fire. On the third day of the festival, Miku invites Futaro to a rooftop, where they find two of their classmates arguing about the takoyaki stand incident. After reprimanding her classmates, Miku confronts Futaro out of jealousy from catching up with Takebayashi, a female classmate from his elementary school, and kisses him. Yotsuba overworks herself in helping different clubs, and on the second day she collapses from exhaustion. While in the hospital, Yotsuba learns from Futaro that some of the students she has helped before offered their assistance during her absence. On the third day of the festival, Yotsuba kisses a resting Futaro. On the first and second days, Itsuki meets guest teacher Mudō, who reveals he is the quintuplets' biological father. Itsuki scolds Mudō for abandoning her mother upon finding out she was pregnant with quintuplets. On the third day, Futaro motivates Itsuki to keep following her dream of being a teacher against Mudō's advice. Later, Maruo, Futaro's father Isanari, and Miku (disguised as Itsuki) meet with Mudō. Itsuki tells Mudō that he is not suitable to be the quintuplets' father after failing to see through Miku's disguise. Itsuki thanks Futaro for helping her find her confidence; unlike her sisters, Itsuki does not kiss Futaro.

At the end of the festival, the quintuplets advise Futaro to approach one of them in individual classrooms to confess. Futaro meets with Yotsuba and confesses his love, but she rejects him as she sees herself as unfit for him. As she runs away from him, Yotsuba recalls her first meeting with Futaro and the promise they made to each other. Futaro catches up to her and manages to convince her and confess her true feelings toward him. Yotsuba decides to address the feelings of her sisters first before dating Futaro. After reconciling with her sisters, Yotsuba begins dating Futaro, during which he suddenly proposes to her for marriage at the park with a swing they visited before. Five years later, the quintuplets reunite for Yotsuba's wedding day; Ichika is a celebrity actress flying back from the USA, Itsuki is a teacher, and Nino and Miku own the late Mrs. Uesugi's cafe after Isanari lends it to them. Before the ceremony, the quintuplets dress identically to test Futaro in identifying Yotsuba, but he identifies them all one by one. After the successful wedding, the sisters announce they are joining the newlyweds' honeymoon, and discuss possible countries.

== Voice cast ==
Character	Japanese	English
Futaro Uesugi	Yoshitsugu Matsuoka Mutsumi Tamura (young)	Josh Grelle Terri Doty (young)
Ichika Nakano	Kana Hanazawa	Lindsay Seidel
Nino Nakano	Ayana Taketatsu	Jill Harris
Miku Nakano	Miku Itō	Felecia Angelle
Yotsuba Nakano	Ayane Sakura	Bryn Apprill
Itsuki Nakano	Inori Minase	Tia Ballard
Raiha Uesugi	Natsumi Takamori	
Isanari Uesugi	Satoshi Hino	
Maruo Nakano	Takaya Kuroda	
Rena Nakano	Yuki Kyoka	
Mudō	Jiro Saito	
Yūsuke Takeda	Soma Saito	
Maeda	Hayato Itō	

== Production ==
The staff of the second season of The Quintessential Quintuplets revealed in March 2021 that the production on a sequel had begun. The sequel was confirmed to be a film in April 2021. It would serve as the finale for the anime series, adapting the final four volumes of The Quintessential Quintuplets manga series by Negi Haruba. Pony Canyon was revealed as the film's distributor in October 2021, with Yoshitsugu Matsuoka, Kana Hanazawa, Ayana Taketatsu, Miku Itō, Ayane Sakura, and Inori Minase reprising their respective voice roles as Futaro Uesugi and the Nakano quintuplets Ichika, Nino, Miku, Yotsuba, and Itsuki from the anime series. In December 2021, Masato Jinbo was revealed as the director, Keiichirō Ōchi as the screenwriter, Masato Katsumata as the character designer, Akihito Ougiyama as the art director, Aiko Matsuyama as the color designer, Daisuke Chiba as the cinematographer, and Mutsumi Takemiya as the film editor at Bibury Animation Studios. In October 2022, Crunchyroll revealed the English dub cast for the film.

== Music ==
Hanae Nakamura and Miki Sakurai were confirmed to be composing The Quintessential Quintuplets Movie in December 2021. The Nakano Family Quintuplets, comprising the voice actresses of the quintuplets, performed the film's theme music "The Tracks of the Quintuplets" (五等分の軌跡, Go-Tōbun no Kiseki) and the ending theme music "The Quintessential Quintuplets: Thank You Flowers" (五等分の花嫁～ありがとうの花～, Go-Tōbun no Hanayome: Arigatō no Hana). The original soundtrack and the CD The Tracks of the Quintuplets EP (五等分の軌跡 EP, Go-Tōbun no Kiseki EP), which features the two theme music and the insert song "Love☆Vacation" (ラブ☆バケーション, Rabu☆Bakēshon), were released in Japan by Anchor Records and Pony Canyon, respectively, on May 25, 2022.

The Quintessential Quintuplets: The Movie – Original Soundtrack (Disc 1)
No.	Title	Music	Length
1.	"I Had a Dream"	Miki Sakurai	1:22
2.	"Quintuplets"	Hanae Nakamura	2:27
3.	"METCH"	Sakurai	0:21
4.	"Going to Do It Thoroughly!"	Sakurai	2:56
5.	"Class Conflict"	Nakamura	0:50
6.	"A Taste of Memories"	Nakamura	0:46
7.	"Everything Pays Off!"	Sakurai	0:30
8.	"I Don't Want to Worry You"	Nakamura	1:27
9.	"Be... Because I Like It!!"	Nakamura	1:13
10.	"Thoughts on Father"	Nakamura	0:53
11.	"Penguin Show"	Nakamura	1:15
12.	"A Step Toward the Dream"	Nakamura	2:38
13.	"I Like You 5"	Sakurai	1:17
14.	"Reunion at the School Festival"	Nakamura	2:48
15.	"Choice"	Sakurai	0:33
16.	"No One Chooses"	Nakamura	0:59
17.	"Honest Feelings"	Nakamura	4:01
18.	"Go to Papa"	Nakamura	4:09
19.	"Family"	Nakamura	3:10
20.	"Love Is Aggressive"	Nakamura	0:35
21.	"I Believe in Futaro"	Sakurai	2:33
22.	"Whatever Happens"	Sakurai	1:03
23.	"Trust Me"	Sakurai	0:58
24.	"No More Hesitation"	Sakurai	1:01
25.	"By Everyone's Effort"	Nakamura	1:04
26.	"Give-and-Take"	Sakurai	0:46
27.	"For the Class"	Sakurai	0:47
28.	"For Me"	Sakurai	3:02
29.	"I No Longer Rely on My Memories with You"	Nakamura	1:52
30.	"Mother's Back"	Nakamura	1:04
31.	"Unbearable Feelings"	Nakamura	1:58
32.	"Aiming for the Dream"	Nakamura	3:23
33.	"If There Is Love"	Nakamura	4:32
Total length:			58:13

The Quintessential Quintuplets: The Movie – Original Soundtrack (Disc 2)
No.	Title	Music	Length
1.	"We Are Waiting for You"	Sakurai	3:58
2.	"I Came to See You"	Sakurai	1:13
3.	"Over and Over Again"	Sakurai	1:25
4.	"Being with the Five"	Nakamura	9:01
5.	"Those Memories, These Feelings"	Sakurai	0:48
6.	"I Have Always Loved You"	Sakurai	1:41
7.	"Still Belongs to No One..."	Sakurai	0:20
8.	"Each Feelings"	Sakurai	4:39
9.	"I Love You All the Same"	Nakamura	3:23
10.	"A Place of Memories"	Sakurai	2:55
11.	"A Story You Need to Hear"	Sakurai	1:17
12.	"Childhood Dreams"	Sakurai	0:47
13.	"Towards the Future"	Nakamura	2:30
14.	"Wedding Morning"	Nakamura	3:06
15.	"Like a Father of 2"	Sakurai	1:41
16.	"Quintuplets' Final Game"	Sakurai	6:20
17.	"Everyone Who Has Not Changed"	Nakamura	2:43
18.	"The Quintessential Quintuplets: Thank You Flowers (Wedding ver.)"	Nakamura	3:28
Total length:			51:15

== Marketing ==
A trailer announcing the production for the sequel of The Quintessential Quintuplets anime series and a teaser visual were released in March 2021. The first key visual for The Quintessential Quintuplets Movie was published in October 2021. The film received its first trailer and the second key visual in December 2021. In February 2022, Mages announced a video game based on the film titled The Quintessential Quintuplets Movie: Five Memories of My Time with You (映画「五等分の花嫁」～君と過ごした五つの思い出～, Eiga Gotōbun no Hanayome: Kimi to Sugoshita Itsutsu no Omoide), which was released in Japan on PlayStation 4 and Nintendo Switch on June 2. In March 2022, Weiß Schwarz announced a new set of collectible cards based on the film for a September 9 release in Japan, but it was moved to September 16. The third key visual and the second trailer for the film were released in March 2022. Volume 14.5 of the manga series, which includes a bonus chapter taking place after the events of the original ending, was announced in April 2022 as a gift for moviegoers on the film's premiere.

== Release ==
=== Theatrical ===
The Quintessential Quintuplets Movie was released in 108 theaters in Japan on May 20, 2022, with 91 theaters added on July 29. At the Odex Film Festival, Odex screened the film in Singapore on September 2–4, 2022, and in Malaysia on September 3–4 and 10–11. Crunchyroll began screening the film internationally (excluding Asia and the Middle East) on October 31, 2022, first releasing at Lucca Comics & Games in Lucca, Italy. They released it in Australia and New Zealand on December 1, 2022, in the United States and Canada on December 2, and in the United Kingdom and Ireland on December 7.

=== Home media ===
The Quintessential Quintuplets Movie became available for rent through streaming services in Japan on October 21, 2022, followed by unlimited viewing on June 1, 2023. The film was released on Blu-ray and DVD in Japan on December 21, 2022. They include the colorized version of "Volume 0" of The Quintessential Quintuplets manga series. The film was streamed on Crunchyroll in North America, Central America, South America, Europe, Africa, Oceania, and the Commonwealth of Independent States on April 27, 2023, and on Amazon Prime Video in Japan on May 1. Crunchyroll released the film on Blu-ray in the United States on January 2, 2024, and in the United Kingdom on May 6.

== Reception ==
=== Box office ===
The Quintessential Quintuplets Movie grossed $17.1 million in Japan and $1.32 million in other territories, for a worldwide total of $18.4 million. The film is the seventh highest-grossing anime film and the twentieth-overall highest-grossing film of 2022 in Japan.

The film grossed ¥390 million ($2.97 million) in its opening weekend in Japan, ranking second at the box office. In its second weekend, the film earned ¥216 million ($1.64 million) and ranked down to the third place at the box office. The film reached the one-billion-yen mark at the box office after earning ¥133 million ($1 million) in its third weekend and ranked down to the fourth place. In the 26 days since the film's release, one million tickets were reported to have been sold. The film reached the two-billion-yen box office in its ninth weekend, becoming the fifth Japanese animated film of 2022 to do so.

Outside Japan, the film grossed $502,000 in its opening weekend in the United States and Canada. Deadline Hollywood noted the film was "not a crowd pleaser to its demo like previous titles from [Crunchyroll]", with its opening day earning $266,000 from 910 theaters. In the United Kingdom and Ireland, the film earned £24,000 ($29,520) from 108 theaters in its opening weekend.

=== Critical response ===
The review aggregator website Rotten Tomatoes reported a 92% approval rating, with an average score of 7.6/10, based on 12 reviews. The Japanese review and survey firm Filmarks placed The Quintessential Quintuplets Movie first in their first-day satisfaction ranking, with an average rating of 4.15/5, based on 520 reviews.

Phil Hoad at The Guardian gave The Quintessential Quintuplets Movie 4 out of 5 stars, stating that the film was "a fairly charming, if stridently sentimental and moralistic romantic fantasy that, with its clever structure, even manages to pick at the mysteries of identity." Hoad lauded how director Masato Jinbo depicted each of the quintuplets' individuality over the story's three-day school festival. Simon Abrams of TheWrap felt the film had "all of the melodramatic revelations and puppy-love intrigue of the preceding anime series", stating that "[i]f you like unabashedly corny teen romances, there's a fair chance that the sheer too-much-ness of The Quintessential Quintuplets Movie will appeal to you." Courtney Lanning of Northwest Arkansas Democrat Gazette felt the film was "cute, heartfelt and funny at times" and praised the "bouncy and colorful" art handled by Bibury Animation Studios. Daryl Harding of Crunchyroll praised the film for its animation, sound music, and production. Kim Morrissy of Anime News Network graded the film "B", feeling that the film did "an impressive job with the leadup, dangling the five options in a way that makes them all seem plausible without cheapening the eventual resolution." Richard Whittaker of The Austin Chronicle gave the film 3 out of 5 stars, feeling that it did "what it needs to do in not just making a choice, or making a choice that will please the biggest section of the audience and infuriate too many shippers, but in making a choice that makes sense."

Critics criticized the film's runtime and ending: Abrams felt that it "crams too much of everything into an oversized 136-minute special that mainly serves to wrap up the anime series' loose narrative threads"; Lanning believed that it "would have benefited from a little bit of trimming" and noted how the story at its conclusion "starts to drag"; Harding felt the ending was "rushed"; and Morrissy found the ending focusing on the quintuplets "ends up taking too much time."

=== Accolades ===
In December 2022, The Quintessential Quintuplets Movie placed eleventh among the top 20 Japanese animated films voted by fans to win the Anime of the Year at the Tokyo Anime Award Festival 2023. That month, U-Next placed the film seventh on their list of the "Best 10 Most Popular Works in 2022" for the anime rental category, and Animate Times ranked it fourth on their poll for the top 20 animated films of 2022.

Year	Award	Category	Nominee(s)	Result	Ref.
2022	Newtype Anime Awards	Best Picture (Film)	The Quintessential Quintuplets Movie	Nominated	
2022	Newtype Anime Awards	Best Male Character	Futaro Uesugi	Nominated	
2022	Newtype Anime Awards	Best Female Character	Yotsuba Nakano	Nominated	
2022	Newtype Anime Awards	Best Female Character	Ichika Nakano	Nominated	
2022	Newtype Anime Awards	Best Theme Song	"The Tracks of the Quintuplets" by the Nakano Family Quintuplets	Nominated	
2022	Newtype Anime Awards	Best Theme Song	"The Quintessential Quintuplets: Thank You Flowers" by the Nakano Family Quintuplets	Nominated	
2022	Newtype Anime Awards	Best Director	Masato Jinbo	Nominated	
2022	Newtype Anime Awards	Best Screenplay	Keiichirō Ōchi	Nominated	
2022	Newtype Anime Awards	Best Character Design	Masato Katsumata	Nominated	
2022	Newtype Anime Awards	Best Sound	Hanae Nakamura, Miki Sakurai	Nominated	
2022	Golden Gross Awards	Golden Gross Special Award	The Quintessential Quintuplets Movie	Won	

== Continuation ==
In April 2024, a new anime project based on an original story drafted by Haruba, titled Go-Tōbun no Hanayome* (五等分の花嫁*, The Quintessential Quintuplets*), was announced, which would recount the honeymoon trip between Futaro and the Nakano quintuplets. In September 2024, the English title for the anime was revealed by Pony Canyon as The Quintessential Quintuplets Specials 2. It premiered in Japan on September 20, 2024, which lasted for three weeks, before its television broadcast.
