= Aaron Dismuke =

American voice actor (born 1992)

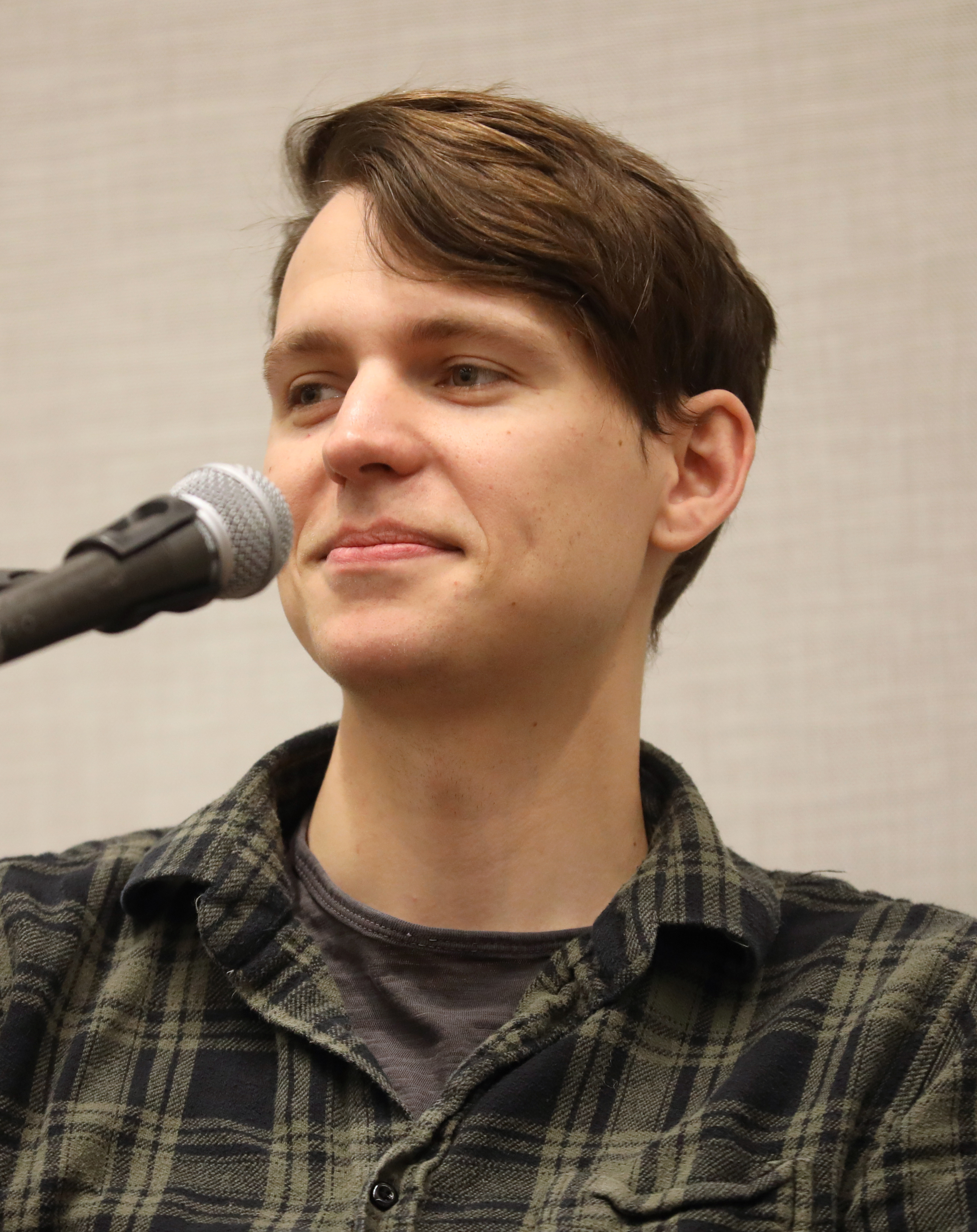
- Dismuke at Game On Expo 2024
- Born: Aaron Mitchell Dismuke; October 13, 1992 (age 34)
- Education: University of North Texas
- Occupations: Voice actor; ADR director; script writer
- Years active: 2002–present
- Relatives: Justin Cook (cousin)

Aaron Mitchell Dismuke (born October 13, 1992) is an American voice actor, ADR director and script writer. He is known for his role as Alphonse Elric in the English dub of the first Fullmetal Alchemist television series, whom he voiced when he was 12 years old. He is also known for his directorial work for the English dubs of Nanbaka, Shomin Sample, Tsugumomo, Cheer Boys!!, Kaguya-sama: Love Is War, Black Clover, Dr. Stone and Luck & Logic. He is also known for his role as Gen Narumi, the seventh captain of the First Division, in the sci-fi/action anime series Kaiju No. 8, and Faerie in Fire Force.

== Biography ==
Dismuke began acting as a young child. His cousin, voice actor and director Justin Cook, helped to gain him his first role. He started voice acting at nine years old, where he voiced Hiro Sohma and the young Akito Sohma in Fruits Basket (2001).

When Dismuke was twelve years old, he was given his first lead role as Alphonse Elric in Fullmetal Alchemist. In Fullmetal Alchemist: Brotherhood, his role of Alphonse Elric was replaced by Maxey Whitehead due to puberty, but he returned to reprise his role in the live-action film on Netflix. Reflecting on his early acting career, Dismuke said: "I definitely didn't spend my early twenties feeling like a washed-up has-been pseudo-child star. In truth, I'm one of the lucky few in this business who've had something approaching job security thanks to my getting cast in a number of awesome shows that keep coming back for new seasons." He also voiced the young Van Hohenheim, the Elric brothers' father in Fullmetal Alchemist: Brotherhood.

He is also the voice of many characters such as Chihiro Furuya in Sankarea, Gen Narumi in Kaiju No. 8, Lucifer in The Devil is a Part-Timer!, Arslan in The Heroic Legend of Arslan, Twelve in Terror in Resonance, Shun Asanaga in Endride, Hayashi in Recovery of an MMO Junkie, Leonardo Watch in Blood Blockade Battlefront, Van Fanel in The Vision of Escaflowne, Senku Ishigami in Dr. Stone, and Miyuki Shirogane in Kaguya-sama: Love Is War.

In 2016, Dismuke was cast in his first role in western animation as Oscar Pine in the Rooster Teeth animated series RWBY. In 2017, he was cast as Yukiya Naruse in Code Geass: Akito the Exiled. In 2018, he was cast as Tamaki Amajiki in My Hero Academia. In 2019, he was cast in his second role in western animation as Beetle in a Cartoon Network series Beetle + Bean. In 2022, Dismuke wrote on X that he would be stepping away from his voice acting work due to COVID-19 and subsequent vocal rest, which required him to temporarily step back from roles such as Miyuki Shirogane in Kaguya-sama: Love is War (which Clifford Chapin filled in his absence) and Nishikata in Teasing Master Takagi-san (which Bryson Baugus filled in his absence). Dismuke later revealed that he had muscle tension dysphonia. Dismuke received treatment and was assured that his vocal chords were not damaged.

== Filmography ==
=== Anime ===
List of English dubbing performances in anime
Year	Title	Role	Crew role, notes	Source
2002	Fruits Basket	Hiro Soma, Akito Soma (Young)	Debut roles	
2004	Kiddy Grade	Yott, Young D'Autriche	Eps. 11, 22	
2004–06	Fullmetal Alchemist	Alphonse Elric		
2005	Burst Angel	Charlie	ep. 14	
2005	Lupin the 3rd - Movie: Farewell to Nostradamus	Sergeo		
2005	The Galaxy Railways	Manabu Yūki (Young)	Eps. 1–2	
2006	Yu Yu Hakusho	Shura		
2006	Fullmetal Alchemist the Movie: Conqueror of Shamballa	Alphonse Elric		
2006	Speed Grapher	Young Takeshi	Ep. 17	
2006	Trinity Blood	Ion Fortuna		
2006	Dragon Ball Z - Movie: Wrath of the Dragon	Minotia		
2007	Mushi-Shi	Yoki, Young Ginko		
2009	Big Windup!	Yūto Sakaeguchi		
2009	Fullmetal Alchemist: Brotherhood	Young Van Hohenheim	Ep. 40	
2009–2019	Fairy Tail	Hibiki	Assistant ADR Director, Script	
2010	Linebarrels of Iron	Izuna Endo		
2010	Ouran High School Host Club	Yasuchika Haninozuka		
2010	Corpse Princess	Ouri Kagami		
2012	Cat Planet Cuties	Kio Kakazu		
2012	Deadman Wonderland	Yo Takami		
2013	Last Exile: Fam, the Silver Wing	Johann		
2013	Sankarea: Undying Love	Chihiro Furuya		
2013	Aesthetica of a Rogue Hero	Tanaka	Eps. 2–4, 9	
2014	Hetalia: The Beautiful World	Cyprus		
2014	Kamisama Kiss	Kohiruimaki	Ep. 10	
2014	Karneval	Jiki		
2014–present	The Devil Is a Part-Timer!	Hanzo Urushihara/Demon General Lucifer		
2015	Ping Pong: The Animation	Yutaka "Peco" Hoshino		
2015	Soul Eater Not!	Aaron	Ep. 3	
2015	Noragami Aragoto	Tatsumi		
2015	Assassination Classroom	Yūji Norita		
2015	Terror in Resonance	Tōji "Twelve" Hisami		
2015	The Rolling Girls	Crocodile		
2015	Dragonar Academy	Ash Blake		
2015	Shomin Sample		ADR Director	
2015–16	Tokyo Ghoul series	Sante	Also season 2	
2015–16	The Heroic Legend of Arslan	Arslan	Also season 2	
2015–17	Blood Blockade Battlefront series	Leonardo Watch	Also season 2	
2016	Endride	Shun Asanaga	Script	
2016	The Vision of Escaflowne	Van Fanel	Funimation dub	
2016	Fairy Tail Zero		Assistant ADR Director, Script	
2016	Garo: The Animation	Sergi	Ep. 6	
2016	Yona of the Dawn	Heukchi	Eps. 4–5	
2016	Danganronpa 3: The End of Hope's Peak High School: Despair Arc	Fuyuhiko Kuzuryu	Also Hope Arc	
2016	Cheer Boys!!	Additional Voices	ADR Director	
2016	Prince of Stride: Alternative	Tōya Natsunagi		
2016	Servamp	Licht Jekylland Todoroki		
2016	Nanbaka	Upa	ADR Director, Script, Also season 2	
2017	Luck & Logic		Assistant ADR Director	
2017	Fūka	Yū Haruna		
2017	ACCA: 13-Territory Inspection Dept.	Rail		
2017	Masamune-kun's Revenge	Shigeo Yamada	Ep. 1	
2017	Chain Chronicle: The Light of Haecceitas	Shidoh	Ep. 7	
2017	Tsukigakirei	Tsubasa Kaneko		
2017	Tsugumomo		ADR Director, Script	
2017	Kado: The Right Answer	Tsukai's Brother	Ep. 8	
2017	Code Geass: Akito the Exiled	Yukiya Naruse		
2017	Hyouka	Takeo Katsuta		
2017	Gamers!	Daiki	Eps. 2–3	
2017	In Another World With My Smartphone		Script	
2017	Tsuredure Children	Tomomichi Motoyama	Ep. 6	
2017	Kino's Journey -the Beautiful World- the Animated Series		Script	
2017	Recovery of an MMO Junkie	Hayashi		
2017	Genocidal Organ	Tuvi		
2017–present	Classroom of the Elite	Kanji Ike		
2017–21	Black Clover	Marx	Ep. 12	
2017–24	My Hero Academia	Kosei Tsuburaba, Tamaki Amajiki / Suneater		
2018	High School DXD	Diodora Astaroth	Hero	
2018	Teasing Master Takagi-san	Nishikata, Newscaster, Vice Principal, Additional Voices	season 1 and 3	
2018	Junji Ito Collection	Ryusuke Fukada	ep. 3A	
2018	Hakyu Hoshin Engi	Fugen Shinjin		
2018	Zoku Tōken Ranbu: Hanamaru	Juzumaru Tsunetsugu		
2018	Hakata Tonkotsu Ramens	Takashi, Macro	Script	
2018	Overlord III	Neuronist Painkill	Script	
2018	Ulysses: Jeanne d'Arc and the Alchemist Knight	Montmorency		
2018	Space Battleship Tiramisu Zwei II	Romeo Alpha	Ep. 9	
2018	Zombie Land Saga	Inubashi	Ep. 5	
2018	Conception	Seiya		
2018–19	The Morose Mononokean	Hanae Ashiya	Also season 2	
2018–19	The Legend of the Galactic Heroes: Die Neue These	Reinhard von Lohengramm	Also season 2	
2018–24	Attack on Titan		ADR Script (seasons 3–4); script supervisor (season 4)	
2019	Dragon Ball Super	Zoire	Ep. 101	
2019	Meiji Tokyo Renka	Kyoka Izumi		
2019	Wise Man's Grandchild		ADR Script	
2019–21	Fruits Basket	Kakeru Manabe		
2019–26	Dr. Stone	Senku Ishigami		
2020	Toilet-Bound Hanako-kun	Natsuhiko Hyuuga		
2020	Bofuri	Marx		
2020	Kaguya-sama: Love Is War	Miyuki Shirogane	Season 1–3, on break season 3 due to vocal cord rest, reprised role for blu-ray release	
2021	Mars Red	Suwa		
2021	Full Dive	Palù		
2021	Moriarty the Patriot	William James Moriarty		
2021	2.43: Seiin High School Boys Volleyball Team	Ryūdai Jinno		
2022	The Prince of Tennis	Oshitari Kenya		
2022	Trapped in a Dating Sim: The World of Otome Games Is Tough for Mobs	Chris		
2022	Blue Lock	Hyōma Chigiri		
2023	Mobile Suit Gundam: The Witch from Mercury	Elan Ceres		
2023	I Shall Survive Using Potions!	Administrator		
2024	The Demon Prince of Momochi House	Yukari		
2024	Kaiju No. 8	Gen Narumi		
2024	Alya Sometimes Hides Her Feelings in Russian	Masachika Kuze		
2024	One Piece	Vegapunk Pythagoras		
2024	Natsume's Book of Friends	Aoi		
2024	Dragon Ball Daima	Glorio		
2025	Synduality: Noir	Tokio		
2025	To Be Hero X	Shang Chao		
2025	Gnosia	Shigemichi		
2025	Let This Grieving Soul Retire!	Krai Andrey		
2026	Hana-Kimi	Tennis Guy		
2026	Roll Over and Die	Linus		
2026	The Daily Life of a Middle-Aged Online Shopper in Another World	Nyanji		

=== Animation ===
List of voice performances in animation
Year	Title	Role	Crew role, notes	Refs
2016–present	RWBY	Oscar Pine, Ozma	Volume 4–Present	
2019	Beetle + Bean	Beetle	Pilot	
2024	RWBY: Beyond	Oscar Pine	one episode	

=== Television ===
List of acting performances in television and web series
Year	Title	Role	Crew role, notes	Refs
2017	CONfessionals	Liam	Eps. 2, 4	
2019	XV Anthology	Radio Broadcast	Ep. 1	

=== Film ===
List of acting performances in film
Year	Title	Role	Crew role, notes	Refs
2023	Justice League x RWBY: Super Heroes & Huntsmen, Part One	Oscar Pine	Voice role	

=== Video games ===
List of acting performances in video games
Year	Title	Role	Crew role, notes	Refs
2021	Tales of Luminaria	Leo Fourcade		
2021	Terrain of Magical Expertise	Kirbopher		
2022	Cookie Run: Kingdom	Clotted Cream Cookie	English dub	
2022	Path to Nowhere	Levy, Parma	English dub	
2022	Potionomics	Robin	Added in Masterwork Edition update	
2025	Zenless Zone Zero	Damian Blackwood	English dub	
2026	Code Vein II	Lyle McLeish	English dub	
