= List of The Quintessential Quintuplets characters =

A promotional poster of the anime adaptation featuring (clockwise from the bottom left) Futaro, Yotsuba, Ichika, Nino, Itsuki, and Miku

This is a list of characters from the anime and manga series The Quintessential Quintuplets.

== Main characters ==
Futaro Uesugi (上杉 風太郎, Uesugi Fūtarō)
Voiced by: Yoshitsugu Matsuoka, Mutsumi Tamura (child) (Japanese); Jessie James Grelle, Terri Doty (child) (English)
A blunt, friendless high school student who is very academically gifted, Fuutarou lives with his sister and father in a small apartment. He is serious and dedicated to his efforts in helping the Nakano sisters improve their grades, but is often at odds with others for his avarice and conceited nature. He likes dishes that Raiha cooks, but dislikes raw fish. His favorite drink is barley tea, his favorite animals are gorillas and his daily convention is storing one coin. (Note: From the character profile in volume three and follow-up volumes.) In his student handbook, he keeps a photo of a girl he met in Kyoto while he was in sixth grade, who was his inspiration to study. It is later revealed that she is one of the Nakano Quintuplets. He was once a rather hot-headed kid who used to play pranks to get other kids' attention, but following the encounter with one of the quintuplets he decided to change and devote himself to studying, so that he could be someone who would "be needed" by someone special (specifically Raiha). In fact, this mentality of his led him to believe that relationships are the worst disgrace a high-school student can encounter since it would divert his attention from building a career. Despite genuinely caring for all the sisters, Futaro does not love them in a romantic way at all, and is often left baffled and creeped out whenever the sisters confess their feelings for him. Most of the story revolves around him avoiding the girls and constantly rejecting their advances, making it clear that he does not have feelings for them at all, and he doesn't like the idea of falling in love with anyone, which often leaves the girls frustrated. However, following his continuous interactions with the quintuplets, he begins to open up his heart and change his mind, questioning his feelings more and more, to the point where he realizes that not meeting the 5 girls wouldn't have given him the possibility of moving on from his status quo; all of this culminates with him being able to fall in love and confess to his future bride.
Ichika Nakano (中野 一花, Nakano Ichika; "one-flower, a flower")
Voiced by: Kana Hanazawa, Ayane Sakura (commercial) (Japanese); Lindsay Seidel (English)
The oldest quintuplet sister has short hair without any accessories, with her trademark being her earring in her right ear. As the firstborn, Ichika tries to act like a responsible older sister. She is caring, thoughtful, and wise but also teases her sisters as well as Futaro. Conversely, she enjoys sleeping and her room is incredibly messy. She aspires to become a movie actress and dedicates most of her time and resources to do so, to the point of having to quit schooling to focus on her acting career. She fell in love with Futaro and wanted to confess to him, even though he does not reciprocate at all, but having heard Nino confessing to Futaro prevented her from doing so. As she grew to accept she wanted Futaro for herself, she started using underhanded methods to get closer to him and sabotage her sisters in the process. She used Miku's disguise as a way to cheat her way into his heart, almost sabotaging Miku's chances to confess in the process. It is revealed that she met Futaro five years before the start of the story: after Futaro and the girl from the photo had spent the entire day together and both went to the inn the quintuplets were staying at, she was interested in him and played cards with him while Yotsuba was gone, with Futaro himself unaware that he was interacting with another quintuplet. She had forgotten about this exchange until they reunited years later, when he put an outfit on as a disguise, resembling the way he looked years ago. After getting called out by Futaro about her schemes and realizing the error of her ways, she helps Miku properly confess to Futaro and decides to stop pursuing her love towards him, lying to him that their moments together were all lies. She becomes his guide on his path to accept he was in love and becomes the first quintuplet in knowing his choice. After Futaro's choice at the end of the school festival, she congratulates him and pushes him to be more open with his feelings. Five years later, she becomes a famous actress known around the world.
Nino Nakano (中野 二乃, Nakano Nino; "two-no")
Voiced by: Ayana Taketatsu, Ayane Sakura (commercial) (Japanese); Jill Harris (English)
The second-oldest quintuplet sister has shoulder-length hair with two butterfly-style accessories on the sides. Due to her poor eyesight, she has been wearing contact lenses for the past three years but still takes five minutes to put them in. Although she is caring and playful with her sisters, she shows an aggressive personality to outsiders, and has a rivalry with Miku due to their polarizing personalities and skill sets. She is also fashionable and skilled at cooking, hinted to have dreams of becoming a chef. She views Futaro as an interloper into the sisters' unique relationship, and has gone to extreme, sometimes illegal lengths to ban him from their apartment. She is afraid to be left behind and desires to find her own path, but she is afraid to let go of the past and the dynamic she had with her sisters since they were children. Her problems with Futaro come from the very fact that she sees him as the one changing the status quo she had grown accustomed to, which sometimes generates conflict between her and her sisters.
However, she starts seeing Futaro as someone who respects her feelings and one who desires to see the Nakano quintuplets together as a family, touching her heart. After coming to terms with her past fear of losing her sisters because of each of them taking different life routes, and after fully realizing her feelings, she becomes the first quintuplet to successfully confess to Futaro. Following this, she becomes far more open and flirtatious towards him, going as far as to try and have sex with him in a hot spring, though he always rejects her, making it clear he does not like her in the slightest. After Futaro's choice at the end of the school festival, she becomes upset with Yotsuba's consideration of her feelings, as she sees it as pity. After a heartfelt exchange, she accepts Yotsuba's resolve, acknowledging her as a rival and warns that she will take any chance to take Futaro away if their relationship ever falls apart. Five years later, she opens the Nakano Bakery shop with Miku, borrowing the location of the former Uesugi restaurant.
Louis Kemner of Comic Book Resources stated, "Nino Nakano was rather standoffish, even hostile, when Futaro Uesugi showed up in The Quintessential Quintuplets, but she's not a bad person by any means. Around her sisters, Nino is a bit hotheaded but otherwise sweet and caring, and she's a big sucker for romance. It's one of her best traits, aside from how honest she is about her feelings."
Miku Nakano (中野 三玖, Nakano Miku; "three-ku, three-nine")
Voiced by: Miku Itō, Ayane Sakura (commercial) (Japanese); Felecia Angelle (English)
The middle quintuplet sister has medium-length hair, "emotionless" eyes and normally a specific pair of headphones around her neck. She has a quiet and passive personality ranging from stoic to shy, few friends, and a secret otaku interest in warlords of specific eras of Japanese history. Although also bad at school, she initially performs the best academically out of all of the sisters. She seems to be the first one to fall in love with Futaro upon him becoming their tutor (discounting Yotsuba), though Futaro initially is completely oblivious, and never shows any signs of reciprocating in the slightest. Her cooking skills are abysmal, but after Futaro said that he preferred girls who can cook, she began focusing to improve that talent. While taking confidence in her pursuit of Futaro, seeing her sisters one by one starting to pursue his affection as well makes her shyness bloom even more, viewing her sisters as better candidates for his love and growing scared of playing fair against those who have a more aggressive approach. She manages to successfully confess to Futaro a second time, though she leaves it vague enough to make him embarrassed. After this, she regains her confidence, and goes for a more assertive and aggressive approach like Nino. She decides to pursue culinary arts after realizing she likes to make stuff, regardless if it is for Futaro's sake or not. After Futaro's choice at the end of the school festival, she counsels Yotsuba into accepting the other sisters' frustration and anger, and that Yotsuba should pursue her own happiness. She ultimately realizes Futaro does not love her at all, but she is still happy that she has become a unique individual and takes pride in it. Five years later she opens the Nakano Bakery shop with Nino, borrowing the location of the former Uesugi restaurant.
Yotsuba Nakano (中野 四葉, Nakano Yotsuba; "four-leaf (clover)")
Voiced by: Ayane Sakura, Yuki Kyoka (child) (Japanese); Bryn Apprill (English)
The fourth quintuplet sister has medium-length hair and a ribbon styled into two vertical ears. She is always cheerful, friendly, happy, energetic, and exceptionally good at sports; her constantly active personality sometimes annoying others. She is by far the worst student of the sisters, having frequently received low scores on school tests. Her actions usually suggest either a complete absence of thought or unconscious intricate plans far beyond anything the other characters could imagine. She is the only one to immediately accept Futaro as their tutor, and becomes his primary confidante in him trying to relate to the rest of the sisters. She's supportive and always looking out for other people, especially her sisters and Futaro. However, she has a bad habit of putting others' needs above her own.
Later it is revealed that she is the girl from the photo, the one Futaro met 5 years before the start of the story during a school trip at Kyoto. She met him by coincidence, getting him out of a complicated situation and spent the rest of the day together. Connecting after enjoying their adventure during the day and developing feelings for each other, both promised to improve their grades to apply to highly profitable jobs and make their respective families have a better lifestyle, specifically Raiha for Futaro and Rena for Yotsuba. However, due to her own low self-confidence and identity issues while growing up, as well as Rena's death soon after the Kyoto trip, she slowly started growing distant from her sisters, seeing them getting slightly better grades than herself with little effort, while she studied hard with failing results, frustration building within her. Therefore, Yotsuba decides to focus on clubs and develop her athletic abilities, losing her resolve to study entirely and changing her mindset from self-improvement to competition for recognition above her sisters and being recognized as the superior to the rest of the sisters. That ultimately results in her getting expelled from her previous school, but her sisters refuse to leave her alone and transfer to the new school with her. Overwhelmed by their compassion, her selfish mind view is shattered and she vows to prioritize their own happiness and desires over her own.
She accepts Futaro's tutelage as an excuse to be around and support him, as well as atone for her past selfishness, despite the sisters' being unaware of it. Despite Itsuki's support, Yotsuba refuses to tell him who she is after meeting with him at the start of the story, because she views herself as a failure for not keeping the promise they made, and decides to support him in his school and love life. This results in her becoming devastated when she realizes her sisters are also in love with him, but continues to ignore her own feelings for him in favor of supporting them. However, her subtle yet meaningful support throughout the series ends up getting noticed by Futaro, ultimately leading to him falling in love with her and choosing her at the end of the school festival. Initially she refuses and runs away, but after hearing Futaro's confession, she becomes unable to hold her feelings down and confesses her love. After the school festival, she decides that before dating Futaro she needs to talk with her sisters about their feelings and her own, especially with Nino and Miku. After coming to terms with the idea that she can pursue her own happiness, she accepts both Futaro's confession and proposal, and they become a couple. Five years later, she lives together with Futaro in Tokyo and celebrates her wedding ceremony. In the final chapter, it is revealed she is the one who kissed Futaro under the bell while disguised as Itsuki, an event which Futaro in the future narrates as the moment he started seeing his bride as special.
Itsuki Nakano (中野 五月, Nakano Itsuki; "five-moon, May")
Voiced by: Inori Minase, Ayane Sakura (commercial), Yuki Kyoka (Rena) (Japanese); Tia Ballard (English)
The youngest quintuplet sister has an expressive ahoge, long hair with two twirling "streams" and two stars beside her eyes. She has a two-faced personality. She is always friendly with acquaintances and classmates but Futaro's presence immediately puts her in attack mode due to his past insults. Ever since she was little, she was close to her mother, Rena. After Rena's death, she decided to cope with her loss by trying to replace Rena as the mother-figure of the quintuplets, with little success(es). This makes her act properly towards others, and is stern with her sisters at times, taking her mother's advice seriously, whether it is about how they should act with each other or how they should be careful when picking their romantic partner. After thinking about what to do with her career path, she decides to follow in her mother's footsteps and become a teacher, despite her low grades. During one point of the series, she dresses as the girl from the photo, nicknaming herself "Rena" (after her mother), and meets with Futaro in the present to sever ties with him and force him to move on from their promise. Later (after the reveal that "Rena"/Itsuki was not the girl from the photo) it's revealed that she was asked by Yotsuba (the girl from the photo) to perform this task, as Yotsuba herself isn't good with disguises and doesn't want her identity revealed to Futaro, and felt their promise was holding him back from enjoying his school life like a normal student. However, later in the series, Itsuki felt she could not keep the secret hidden much longer as she thought of it as unfair to both Yotsuba and Futaro and decided to dress as "Rena" on her own once again to make Futaro remember who he met, only for her advances to be rejected by him, who had since figured out the girl of the photo was one of the quintuplets, though not exactly which one, and he was sick of playing along with their tricks. After Futaro makes his choice, Itsuki goes under a brief period of self-doubt, unable to congratulate him on his decision and realizes her hidden feelings for him. However, after overhearing Yotsuba and Nino's discussion, she decides to let go of those feelings by realizing that a fruitless love can also be beautiful, deciding to treasure her memories with Futaro instead. Five years later, she becomes a teacher.

== Supporting characters ==
=== Uesugi family ===
Raiha Uesugi (上杉 らいは, Uesugi Raiha)
Voiced by: Natsumi Takamori (Japanese); Dani Chambers (English)
Futaro's cheerful younger sister. The only female in the family and the most family-conscious, she is effectively the head of the small household. A running gag is that her cute expressions often unintentionally sway others' hearts (primarily Futaro, Yotsuba, and Itsuki) to do what she wants or dote on her. Appreciating the hard work Futaro does for their family, she sometimes delays supper until he returns home so she can prepare his favorite meal.
Isanari Uesugi (上杉 勇也, Uesugi Isanari)
Voiced by: Satoshi Hino (Japanese); Jim Foronda (English)
Futaro's father. He is somewhat immature for his age and has golden hair and sunglasses on his forehead. He advises Futaro not to study so hard.

=== Nakano family ===
Dr. Maruo Nakano (中野 マルオ, Nakano Maruo; "circle-o")
Voiced by: Takaya Kuroda (Japanese); Christopher Wehkamp (English)
The quintuplets' stepfather and the person who hires Futaro to be the quintuplets' tutor. He threatens to fire Futaro if any of the quintuplets fail the midterm exam. In the past, he was a student of Rena and classmate of Isanari (Futaro's father). As a student, he was the student council president as well as the president of Rena's fan club.
Rena Nakano (中野 零奈, Nakano Rena; "zero-na")
Voiced by: Yuki Kyoka (Japanese); Brianna Roberts (English)
The quintuplets' deceased mother. She was "a gentle and maternal female" according to Itsuki's words. During her lifetime, she was a stern and strict teacher, and she often punished her students with iron-fist sanctions. However, because of her good appearance, she was welcomed by students. (Note: Itsuki Nakano uses her mother's name while pretending to be the girl Futaro met in Kyoto as a child.)
Nakano Quintuplets' Grandfather
Voiced by: Yutaka Nakano (Japanese); Kent Williams (English)
The quintuplets' grandfather; Rena's father. He is the operator of the old-fashioned hot-spring inn "Kumatora" (熊虎, Kumatora; "Bear Tiger"). He is usually quiet even when talking to the guests. He teaches Futaro how to tell the difference between the sisters.

=== Classmates and faculty ===
Yusuke Takeda (武田 祐輔, Takeda Yūsuke)
Voiced by: Soma Saito (Japanese); Stephen Fu (English)
A classmate of the Nakano quintuplet sisters and Futaro when they are in their third year of high school. The son of the high school principal. He is considered popular for his elegant appearance. For a long time, he ranked second in the school exam rankings, and he regarded Futaro as his rival, though the rivalry was one-sided.
Maeda (前田)
Voiced by: Hayato Itō (Japanese); Ricco Fajardo (English)
A bit of a bad boy with brown hair and ferocious eyes. He once liked Ichika and tried to invite her to a bonfire ball but that ended in failure as he was rejected by Miku, who disguised herself as Ichika. Upon asking for suggestions for finding a partner, Futaro suggests to him that he invite a girl from class. He was later invited to dance by a girl on the last evening of the school camping trip and ends up marrying her.
Eba (江場)
Voiced by: Yukari Anzai (Japanese); Suzie Yeung (English)
The captain of the school's track and field club. She has tanned skin and a long ponytail, as well as a cunning personality. She once attempted to persuade Yotsuba to take part in the track and field finals instead of going over her lessons. However, she was strongly rejected by Nino, who disguised herself as Yotsuba, before eventually being declined by the real Yotsuba.
Hongo (ホンゴー, Hongō)
Voiced by: Aina Suzuki
The captain of the school's basketball club. She invited Yotsuba to fill a sick player's spot. After witnessing Yotsuba's talent, Hongo officially invited her to join the basketball club. Hongo later got declined by Yotsuba herself as Yotsuba wanted to focus on her study rather than sports during the upcoming midterms.
Yamada (山田)
Voiced by: Hisako Tōjō
Nino's friend.
Otori (大鳥, Ōtori)
Voiced by: Kaoru Sakura
Nino's friend. She and Yamada usually hang out with Nino at school.
PE teacher
Voiced by: Ryou Sugisaki
The teacher who failed to distinguish between the Nakano sisters during the mid-term exams, when the girls attempt to sneak in for arriving late. He has a muscular build.

== Other characters ==
Oda (織田)
Voiced by: Ryota Akazawa
The president of brokerage film where Ichika is affiliated, and a single father whose wife left him for her lover. At the beginning of the story, he worked as a driver for Ichika taking her to interviews, and he is interested in Futaro after Ichika's successful interview.
Ebata (江端) / Atabe Maruo (阿多部 丸男, Maruo Atabe)
Voiced by: Yuuki Sanpei (Japanese); Shawn Gann (English)
The secretary and the driver of the quintuplets' stepfather. He is a white haired male and was also a school teacher. He took care of the quintuplets when they were little. He occasionally takes the quintuplets to school by car. During the period when Futaro resigned as a tutor, he temporarily replaces him.
Kiku (菊)
The daughter of the Director. Kiku is an immature kindergartner with big eyes and three braids, as well as an arrogant personality. She felt lonely as her mother had disappeared, but she was later enlightened by Futaro.
Shimoda (下田)
Voiced by: Sayuri Yahagi (Japanese); Nazia Chaudhry (English)
A lecturer of the cram school. Shimoda was a student of Rena (the quintuplets' mother), the classmate of Isanari (Futaro' s father), and Maruo (the quintuplets' stepfather). She admired Rena for being a teacher, and followed the same profession because of her. In addition, she is also an advisor for Itsuki concerning her future career plans.
Sanada (真田)
Voiced by: Ayumi Mano (Japanese); Ashe Thurman (child), Kevin D. Thelwell (English)
A boy who appeared in the Futaro's Kyoto trip flashback photo. He was the childhood friend of Takebayashi. They grew up together and their parents maintained close ties.
Takebayashi (竹林)
Voiced by: Yūki Kyōka (Japanese); Kimberley Anne Campbell (English)
A childhood classmate of Futaro. She has a good relationship with him.
