= Felecia Angelle =

American voice actress

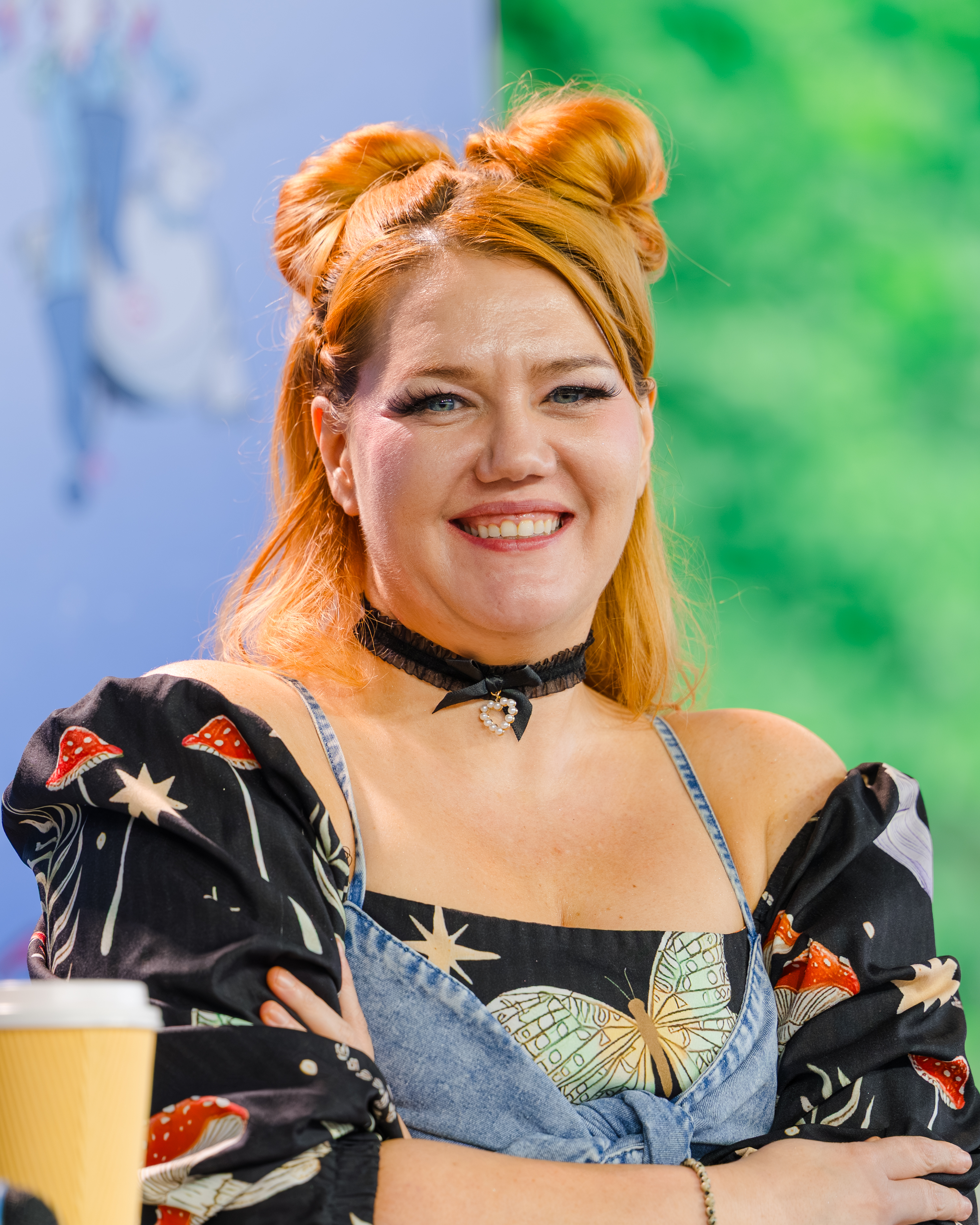
- Angelle at GalaxyCon Nashville in 2026
- Born: July 27, 1986 (age 40); Lafayette, Louisiana, U.S.
- Occupations: Voice actress; ADR director
- Years active: 2013–present
- Website: www.feleciaangelle.com

Felecia Angelle (born July 27, 1986) is an American voice actress and ADR director. She has provided voices for a number of English language versions of Japanese anime films and television series. Angelle is best known as the voice of Kohaku from Dr. Stone, Alex Benedetto from Gangsta, Mana Takamiya from Date A Live, Shikimi Shiramine from Love Tyrant, Sonia Summers from Bem, Alicia VII from Akashic Records of Bastard Magic Instructor, Anzu from Ensemble Stars!, Rita Izumi from A Certain Scientific Accelerator, Kae Tojo from Shomin Sample, Funabori from D-Frag!, Frill from Wonder Egg Priority, Momiji from Code:Breaker, Lancelot from Sakura Wars the Animation, Waltrud Krupinski from Brave Witches, Fubuki from Kancolle: Kantai Collection, Nozomi Moritomo from The Rolling Girls, Miku Nakano from The Quintessential Quintuplets, Shinoa Hīragi from Seraph of the End, Toru Hagakure from My Hero Academia, Emi Yusa from The Devil Is a Part-Timer!, Perona from One Piece, and Shalltear Bloodfallen from Overlord.

== Filmography ==
=== Anime ===
List of dubbing performances in anime
Year	Title	Role	Notes	Source
2013	A Certain Scientific Railgun S	Eiga Kanmi		
2013	Aesthetica of a Rogue Hero	Miu Osawa		
2013	Tokyo Ravens	Takiko Somatic		
2013	We Without Wings	Asuka Watarai		
2013	Eureka Seven: AO	Chloe McCaffrey		
2013	Wolf Children	Bunko		
2013	Good Luck Girl!	Atsushi Kano	Ep. 8	
2013	High School DxD	Raynare/Yuma Amano	Debut role	
2014	Kamisama Kiss	Kotake	Ep. 5	
2014	One Piece	Perona, Yoko	Funimation dub, Assistant ADR Director	
2014	Ben-To	Hana Oshiroi		
2014	Space Dandy	033H	Ep. 9	
2014	Haganai NEXT	Aoi Yusa		
2014	Karneval	Kana, Yukkin	Ep. 2 (Kana)	
2014	Red Data Girl	Angelica Bernard	Eps. 9, 11–12	
2014	Senran Kagura	Asuka		
2014	Code:Breaker	Momiji		
2014–2015	Fairy Tail	Coco		
2014–present	Date A Live series	Mana Takamiya		
2014–present	The Devil Is a Part-Timer!	Emi Yusa/Emilia Justina		
2015	Absolute Duo	Sakuya Tsukumo		
2015	Ninja Slayer From Animation	Okayo	Ep. 3	
2015	Noragami	Miyu	Ep. 3	
2015	Dragonar Academy	Cosette Shelley		
2015	Gangsta.	Alex Benedetto		
2015	Assassination Classroom	Manami Okuda	also Koro-sensei Q!	
2015	Attack on Titan: Junior High		Assistant ADR Director	
2015	Nobunagun	Yaginuma		
2015	Seraph of the End	Shinoa Hīragi		
2015	Blood Blockade Battlefront		Assistant ADR Director	
2015	Shomin Sample	Kae Tojo		
2015	Sky Wizards Academy		ADR Director	
2015	World Break: Aria of Curse for a Holy Swordsman	Satsuki Ranjo		
2015	D-Frag!	Funabori		
2015	Daimidaler: Prince vs Penguin Empire	Macaroni		
2015	Danganronpa: The Animation	Aoi Asahina		
2015	Death Parade	Risa	Ep. 6	
2015	The Rolling Girls	Nozomi Moritomo		
2015	Ultimate Otaku Teacher	Taki Komiya		
2015	Tokyo Ghoul	Haru	Ep. 11	
2015	Yurikuma Arashi	Eriko Oniyama		
2015	Freezing Vibration	Holly Rose		
2015–2018	Overlord	Shalltear Bloodfallen	19 episodes	
2016	Barakamon		Assistant ADR Director	
2016	Castle Town Dandelion	Uzuki		
2016	Danganronpa 3: The End of Hope's Peak High School	Aoi Asahina		
2016	D.Gray-man	Fo		
2016	Divine Gate	Hǫgni		
2016	Bikini Warriors	Fighter		
2016	Chaos Dragon	Shaddy	ADR Director	
2016	Dimension W	Atsuko Hirose	Ep. 6	
2016	Keijo!!!!!!!!	Sayaka Miyata		
2016	Gonna be the Twin-Tail!!	Strawberry Twin		
2016	Endride	Falarion		
2016	Grimgar of Fantasy and Ash	Sassa	ADR Director	
2016	Heavy Object	Charlotte Zoom		
2016	Juden Chan	Iono Tomonaga		
2016	The Vision of Escaflowne	Eriya	Funimation dub	
2016	Three Leaves, Three Colors	Serina Nishiyama		
2016	Tokyo ESP	Asuna Kamerode	Eps. 3, 6, 8–9	
2016	selector spread WIXOSS	Fumio Futase		
2016	Terror in Resonance	Haruka Shibazaki		
2016	Puzzle & Dragons X		ADR Director	
2016	Overlord	Shalltear Bloodfallen		
2016	Pandora in the Crimson Shell: Ghost Urn	Proserpina		
2016–2025	My Hero Academia	Toru Hagakure / Invisible Girl		
2016	Lord Marksman and Vanadis	Black Bow	Eps. 3, 7, 13	
2017	18if	Mei Asakura	Ep. 6	
2017	ACCA: 13-Territory Inspection Dept.	Acca	Ep. 2	
2017	Akashic Records of Bastard Magic Instructor	Alicia VII		
2017	Akiba's Trip: The Animation	Urame Mayonaka		
2017	Alice & Zōroku	Hatori Shikishima	Ep. 8	
2017	Anime-Gataris	Erika Aoyama		
2017	Attack on Titan	Lynne	Eps. 26–27	
2017	Brave Witches	Waltrud Krupinski		
2017	Chain Chronicle: The Light of Haecceitas	Juliana		
2017	Chaos;Child	Serika Onoe		
2017	Convenience Store Boy Friends	Mami Mihashi		
2017	Dragon Ball Z Kai	Suno	Ep. 156	
2017	Fūka	Maya Haruna		
2017	Garo: Vanishing Line	Chiaki		
2017	In Another World With My Smartphone	Yumina Urnea Belfast	Season 1 only	
2017	KanColle: Kantai Collection	Fubuki		
2017	Kenka Bancho Otome: Girl Beats Boys	Rintaro Kira (Young)	ADR Director	
2017	King's Game The Animation	Mami Shirokawa		
2017	Knight's & Magic	Nora Frykberg		
2017	Love Tyrant	Shikimi Shiramine		
2017	Miss Kobayashi's Dragon Maid	Sanae "Georgie" Saikawa		
2017	Myriad Colors Phantom World	Rudolph	Ep. 7	
2017	New Game!	Butterfly Pink	Ep. 9	
2017	Recovery of an MMO Junkie	Yuki		
2017	Restaurant to Another World	Shia Gold	Ep. 8	
2017	Rio: Rainbow Gate!	Jane	Ep. 1	
2017	Saiyuki Reload Blast	Hakuryu		
2017	Sakura Quest	Sayuri Shinomiya	Ep. 8	
2017	Tsuki ga Kirei	Aoi Takizawa		
2017	Tsuredure Children	Ryoko Kaji		
2017	Valkyrie Drive: Mermaid	Miranda		
2017	Star Blazers: Space Battleship Yamato 2199	Makoto Harada		
2017–present	Classroom of the Elite	Suzune Horikita		
2018	Hakata Tonkotsu Ramens	Sayuri		
2018	Hakyu Hoshin Engi	Kō Shi		
2018	Hanebado!	Miki Sasashita		
2018	Harukana Receive	Narumi Toi		
2018	Hinomaru Sumo	Chizuko Hori		
2018	Aokana: Four Rhythm Across the Blue	Minori Hosaka		
2018	Cardcaptor Sakura: Clear Card	Feimei	Ep. 19	
2018	Chio's School Road	Takkun		
2018	Citrus	Sara Tachibana		
2018	Concrete Revolutio series	Lin		
2018	Golden Kamuy	Inkarmat		
2018	Katana Maidens	Yomi Satsuki		
2018	Junji Ito Collection	Kinuko Hidaka	ep4B	
2018	The Master of Ragnarok & Blesser of Einherjar	Ingrid		
2018	Pop Team Epic	Chieko	ep. 6	
2019	Bem	Sonia Summers		
2019	The Quintessential Quintuplets	Miku Nakano		
2019	Mix: Meisei Story	Nagisa Tsukikage		
2019	My Roommate Is a Cat	Narumi Yasaka		
2019–2026	Dr. Stone	Kohaku		
2019	Million Arthur series	Bethor		
2019	Boogiepop and Others	Additional Voices	2 episodes, ADR Director (eps 10–13)	
2019	Kono Oto Tomare! Sounds of Life	Mashiro		
2019	A Certain Scientific Accelerator	Rita Izumi		
2019	Ensemble Stars!	Anzu		
2019	Cop Craft	Tilarna Exedirika		
2019	Kemono Friends	Axis Deer		
2019	The Morose Mononokean	Chunzo	season 2	
2020	Plunderer	Pelmo	Ep. 6	
2020	Ashita no Nadja	Rosemary Applefield		
2020	Arte	Arte Spalletti		
2021	Sakura Wars the Animation	Lancelot		
2021	Wonder Egg Priority	Frill		
2021	Magatsu Wahrheit Zuerst	Schaake		
2022	She Professed Herself Pupil of the Wise Man	Mira / Dunbalf Gandagore / Sakimori Kagami (Female)		
2023	My Happy Marriage	Hazuki Kudo		
2025	Medalist	Mario Nachi		

=== Film ===
List of voice performances in film
Year	Title	Role	Notes	Source
2016	Evangelion: 3.0 You Can (Not) Redo	Sakura Suzuhara		
2016	Ghost in the Shell: The New Movie	Tsumugi (Young)		
2018	My Hero Academia: Two Heroes	Toru Hagakure		
2019	One Piece: Stampede	Perona		
2020	My Hero Academia: Heroes Rising	Toru Hagakure		
2022	The Quintessential Quintuplets Movie	Miku Nakano		
2024	Her Blue Sky	Aoi Aioi (young)		

=== Video games ===
List of voice performances in video games
Year	Title	Role	Notes	Source
2015	Dragon Ball Xenoverse	Supreme Kai of Time		
2016	Dragon Ball Xenoverse 2	Supreme Kai of Time		
2019	Borderlands 3	Ava		
2020	Dragon Ball Z: Kakarot	Suno		
2020	Fire Emblem Heroes	Kris (Female)		
2020	Genshin Impact	Mona Megistus		
2020	3 out of 10	Midge		
2022	Phantom Breaker: Omnia	Sophia Karganova		
2023	Honkai: Star Rail	Asta, Hook		
