= Recovery of an MMO Junkie =

Japanese manga series and its adaptation(s)

- Cover of the first Japanese manga volume published by Media Factory, featuring the protagonists Hayashi (left) and Lily (right)

ネト充のススメ (Netojū no Susume)
- Genre: Romantic comedy, slice of life
- Manga
- Written by: Rin Kokuyō
- Published by: Media Factory
- Magazine: Comico Japan
- Original run: October 16, 2013 – June 30, 2018
- Volumes: 2
- Anime television series
- Directed by: Kazuyoshi Yaginuma
- Produced by: Takuma Sugi; Atsushi Ebu; Shigeaki Komatsu; Hiroyuki Birukawa; Jun'ichi Kaseda; Hiroo Saitō; Takuya Ogawa; Hiroyuki Miyajima; Aiko Nishihara; Ayumi Okamura
- Written by: Kazuyuki Fudeyasu
- Music by: Conisch
- Studio: Signal.MD
- Licensed by: Crunchyroll
- Original network: Tokyo MX, ytv, AT-X
- Original run: October 6, 2017 – December 8, 2017
- Episodes: 10 + OVA
- icon

Recovery of an MMO Junkie (Japanese: ネト充のススメ, Hepburn: Netojū no Susume; subtitled Recommendation of the Wonderful Virtual Life) is a Japanese manga series by Rin Kokuyō released as a webtoon on the Comico app. An anime television series adaptation directed by Kazuyoshi Yaginuma and animated by Signal.MD aired from October to December 2017.

== Plot ==
Moriko Morioka is a 30-year-old successful career woman who decides to quit her taxing corporate job and become an elite NEET and find a more fulfilling life. She joins Fruits de Mer, an MMORPG, and creates a male character named Hayashi as her avatar. In the game, Hayashi meets another character, Lily, a high-level player who helps him learn the game. Hayashi and Lily become close friends and he joins her guild, @HomeParty. Meanwhile, in the real world, Moriko has a chance encounter with a handsome elite company employee, Yuta Sakurai, who may have ties with her online life.

== Characters ==
Moriko Morioka (盛岡森子, Morioka Moriko)
Voiced by: Mamiko Noto (Japanese); Terri Doty (English)
An unemployed 30-year-old single woman and Hayashi's player. She quit her corporate job being disillusioned with the real world and started playing MMORPGs almost nonstop as a way to find meaning in her life.
Yuta Sakurai (桜井優太, Sakurai Yuta)
Voiced by: Takahiro Sakurai (Japanese); Jessie James Grelle (English)
A 28-year-old British-Japanese businessman and Lily's player. He is elite employee at his trading company. Outside of work, he is socially awkward and has a hard time communicating with others.
Lily (リリィ, Riryi)
Voiced by: Reina Ueda (Japanese); Natalie Hoover (English)
Yuta's character in Fruits de Mer, a female conductor.
Hayashi (林)
Voiced by: Ryōta Suzuki (Japanese); Aaron Dismuke (English)
Moriko's character in Fruits de Mer, a male knight.
Homare Koiwai (小岩井誉, Koiwai Homare)
Voiced by: Tomoaki Maeno (Japanese); Ian Sinclair (English)
Yuta's co-worker and Moriko's former co-worker. He and Moriko used to know each other through their working calls, though they never met personally while she was employed. He holds Moriko in high regard as an employee and was upset when she suddenly decided to quit her job, leading him to find another job at the trading company Yuta works at.
Kazuomi Fujimoto (藤本和臣, Fujimoto Kazuomi)
Voiced by: Takuma Terashima (Japanese); Anthony Bowling (English)
A college student who works part-time at the convenience store Moriko frequently visits and Kanbe's player. He also plays the MMO game and is aware that Moriko is also a player because she usually purchases electronic money for the game every visit.
Kanbe (カンベ)
Voiced by: Yuichi Nakamura (Japanese); Ricco Fajardo (English)
Kazuomi's character in Fruits de Mer, a male assassin, and the guild leader.
Lilac (ライラック, Rairakku)
Voiced by: Yūka Aisaka (Japanese); Rachel Thompson (English)
Pokotaro (ぽこたろう)
Voiced by: Kazuhiro Sunseki (Japanese); Ben Phillips (English)
Himeralda's spouse in real life.
Himeralda (ヒメラルダ, Himeraruda)
Voiced by: Takanori Yagi (Japanese); Brandon McInnis (English)
Pokotaro's spouse in real life.
Harumi (はるみ)
Koiwai's character in Fruits de Mer, a muscular female warrior.
Yuki (ユキ)
Voiced by: Akiho Kumahara (Japanese); Felecia Angelle (English)
Harth (ハース)
Voiced by: Yūko Yamazaki (Japanese); Apphia Yu (English)

== Media ==
=== Manga ===
Recovery of an MMO Junkie is written and illustrated by Rin Kokuyō and was serialized on the Comico app from October 16, 2013, to June 30, 2018. Two volumes were published. The manga went on hiatus in July due to Kokuyō's failing health.

=== Anime ===
An anime television series adaptation by Signal.MD was announced by Comico. The series began streaming on the Japanese streaming service GyaO on October 6, 2017, and then beginning its TV broadcast October 9, 2017, on Tokyo MX and other stations. The opening theme song is "Saturday Night Question" (サタデー・ナイト・クエスチョン) by Megumi Nakajima, while the ending theme song is "Hikari, Hikari" (ひかり、ひかり; "Light, Light") by Yūka Aisaka. Crunchyroll simulcasted the series, while Funimation began streaming a SimulDub on October 30, 2017. The series ran for 10 episodes with an OVA released alongside the Blu-ray box. Crunchyroll streamed the OVA on December 15, 2017.

No.	Title (Note: All English titles are taken from Crunchyroll.)	Original release date
1	"♀ IRL, ♂ Online" "Riaru wa ♀, Netto wa ♂" (リアルは♀、ネットは♂)	October 6, 2017
Moriko Morioka wakes up the morning after quitting her job to play an online MMORPG. After finding her favorite one is no longer in service, Moriko decides to download a newer one called Fruits de Mer and designs her ideal male with the name Hayashi as her in-game avatar. After failing to defeat a boss several times, another player-character named Lily takes pity on Hayashi and helps teach him the basics of the game. Months later, on Christmas Eve, Hayashi has been avoiding Lily. Hayashi privately tells their guildmaster Kanbe that he wanted to save up experience to earn a "crystal rose" for her on his own, but Kanbe warns him not to get too attached to Lily outside the game. In the real world, Moriko buys some food and a game card from a convenience store, but asks for the last piece of "Christmas chicken" at the same time as an attractive man, causing her to run away in embarrassment when he lets her buy it. The next day in the game world, Hayashi and Lily exchange Christmas presents.
2	"We Don't Know a Thing" "Watashitachi wa Nani mo Shiranai" (私たちは何も知らない)	October 13, 2017
Hayashi lies about his true offline identity to the clan, claiming to be a 21-year-old college student and inadvertently helping Lilac win a bet. As Hayashi falls asleep next to Lily in the game world, Moriko suffers a cold in the real world. While trying to walk to the store for medicine, she is accidentally elbowed in the face and later wakes up in the hospital with the man who elbowed her sitting at her bedside. As a manner of apology, the man offers to cover her medical bills and gives his business card, revealing himself as Yuta Sakurai. The next day, Hayashi tells his fellow guild-mates about the incident (while switching the genders of those involved), and Kanbe suggests he start off with an email to thank this person. Moriko send Yuta a message and gets a quick reply offering to meet for dinner. While feeling anxious about meeting Yuta in public, Moriko gains confidence after talking to Lily (as Hayashi) again in the game world.
3	"You and I, the Cowards" "Okubyōmono na Kimi to Watashi" (臆病者な君と私)	October 20, 2017
Yuta has an informal dinner out with his co-worker Homare Koiwai, who talks about working with Moriko in the past despite never seeing her in person. Meanwhile, Yuta responds to Moriko's message, wanting to remain friends after being respectfully turned down for a future meeting. In the game, Hayashi receives an expensive coat from Lily, but is afraid of putting it on as Lily might have ulterior motives. After meeting with Lily to discuss the gift, Lily tells of her history in the game, of being both a girl and a support class that everyone wanted to partner with. When she joined a guild, another female character accused Lily of playing off the guildmaster's feelings. Lily then puts on her own expensive coat and asks Hayashi to be her partner. Moriko is flustered at the thought of accepting a girl's feelings online, but accepts, not knowing who Lily's player really is.
4	"Like a Maiden in Love" "Marude Koisuru Otome no yōna" (まるで恋する乙女のような)	October 27, 2017
Kazuomi briefly chats with Moriko at the convenience store when she buys a game card for a new event in Fruits de Mer. Meanwhile, Homare teases Yuta about his new obsession with the woman he ran into the other day. In-game, the members of the @Home clan try to find the rarest items in loot boxes, after Hayashi tempts fate with an unofficial "Greed Curse". Later, Homare visits the convenience store hoping to find Morioka. He spots her as he is leaving, but goes back in and convinces her to meet for drinks and to trade contact information. He then teases Yuta about it at work the next day. In-game, Hayashi talks to Lily about preparing for a night out with a girl outside the game, but his story sounds very familiar to Lily's player, who is shown to be Yuta.
5	"Secret Triangle" "Himitsu Toraianguru" (秘密トライアングル)	November 3, 2017
Moriko gets incredibly nervous about her appearance for her date with Koiwai. As she buys herself extra pairs of stockings, the clerk Kazuomi talks to her about their shared interest in Fruits de Mer. Hayashi is incredibly nervous after hearing from Lilac about a female friend who used a male avatar, and even more so after discovering that Kanbe is actually Kazuomi in real life. Hayashi tries to get advice about what to wear to his date offline, and gets conflicting opinions from Kanbe and Lily. Later, Moriko decides to fix her hair at a salon and try applying makeup despite being out of practice. Meanwhile, Yuta was told that Homare's date is in two days, but Hayashi's responses hinted that it was tomorrow. After finding that Hayashi is offline the next day before a raid, Yuta logs off and races to the public square to confirm his suspicions, when he spots a beautified Moriko in the crowd.
6	"I'm So Embarrassed I Could Die!" "Hazukashinjai masu!" (恥ずか死んじゃいます！)	November 10, 2017
Moriko waits for Koiwai, but he doesn't show up. While waiting, she meets up with Sakurai. Moriko finds out that she got the day of the week wrong, then Koiwai suggests that she and Sakurai both go for a drink together. On the next day, Moriko goes on the date with Koiwai and talks about her MMORPG hobby and online friends. Sakurai gets worried, logs off suddenly from the game and goes to Koiwai's house to check with him to see how the date went. Moriko reflects on how she feels that her home is the MMOs.
7	"You and I, and Me and You" "Anata to ore to kimi to watashi to" (あなたと俺とキミとわたしと)	November 17, 2017
Sakurai now is sure that Hayashi is Moriko. However he struggles to keep playing on pretending that he doesn't know who Hayashi is. Koiwai decides to give a try to the MMORPG and asks Moriko for help on the game. Moriko decides to try to keep her online friends separated from Koiwai and creates a new character with the looks based on her character from the last game she played before Fruits de Mer. Koiwai creates Harumi, a muscular female warrior. Sakurai then receives a screenshot from Moriko's new character and it reminds him from a character from a previous game. Sakurai then decides to create another new character to play together with Koiwai.
8	"One Step Forward" "Ippo mae e fumidashi ta" (一歩前へ踏み出した)	November 24, 2017
Sakurai remembers from when he played the previous game. Being an adopted foreigner by an elderly Japanese couple, he started playing a game called Nanter SG after their death. In this game, he met a player (whom unknown to him was Moriko) and bonded with her. Then, Sakurai names his character with the same name, Harth, from the previous game to see if Moriko is the same player from the other game. They both realize that they knew each other from the previous game and agree to meet each other. Sakurai then reveals that he is also Lily.
9	"I Call That Feeling Marble" "Sono kimochi māburu" (その気持ちマーブル)	December 1, 2017
Sakurai mistakenly believes he was rejected by Moriko and does not login to Fruits de Mer for a week, upsetting both of them. Eventually Koiwai sets up both of them to meet in the park and smooth things over. The pair goes to the convenience store to get some food, and Moriko gets nervous about her appearance when a store employee asks if they are a couple. As they are walking back, they are caught in the rain Sakurai invites Moriko into his house.
10	"On a Moonlit Evening" "Tsukiyo no ban ni" (月夜の晩に)	December 8, 2017
Moriko continues to be nervous about her appearance and the fact that she is a NEET in her thirties. Sakurai notices her crying and comforts her, telling her that he does not feel that way at all. As they are walking back, Sakurai confesses to her, although Moriko mishears and they both agree to continue playing together and seeing each other in real life. Later on, Koiwai runs into the pair and accuses Moriko and Sakurai of going on a date together, which embarrasses the pair. In the last scene, they are holding hands and walking to their date.
OVA	"Recovery of an MMO Junkie" "Riajū no susume" (リア充のススメ)	December 8, 2017 (BD Box Only); December 15, 2017 (Streaming)
