= Masato Jinbo =

Japanese anime director and screenwriter

- 神保 昌登
- Born: Tokyo, Japan
- Occupations: Anime director; screenwriter
- Years active: 2003–present
- Known for: Fate/kaleid liner Prisma Illya; Chaos;Child

Masato Jinbo (神保 昌登, Jinbo Masato) is a Japanese anime director and screenwriter. Since 2014, he has directed multiple series, including the adaptations of Fate/kaleid liner Prisma Illya and Chaos;Child.

== Biography ==
Jinbo was born in Tokyo and graduated from Tokyo Metropolitan Kogei High School. He worked at Studio Graffiti as an apprentice, and at Studio Cab and Studio Sion as a production manager. In 2005, he directed the web anime Hito Ken Mamoru-kun to Ayumi-chan "Sekai o Shiawase ni". In 2014, Jinbo made his major directorial debut with the second season of the anime series Fate/kaleid liner Prisma Illya.

In 2018, Jinbo established PartsCraft, a company that specializes in animation planning and production. In 2022, he was nominated for Best Director at the Newtype Anime Awards for his work on The Quintessential Quintuplets Movie.

== Works ==
=== TV series ===
- Ginga Densetsu Weed (2006; storyboards)
- Zoids: Genesis (2006; episode director)
- Simoun (2006; episode director)
- Hell Girl (2006, 2017; episode director)
- C³ (2012; episode director)
- Kill Me Baby (2012; episode director)
- Kokoro Connect (2012; episode director)
- Saint Seiya Omega (2012; storyboards)
- Natsuyuki Rendezvous (2012; episode director, storyboards)
- Fate/kaleid liner Prisma Illya (2014–2016; director)
- Shomin Sample (2015; director)
- Star-Myu (2015; episode director, storyboards)
- Chaos;Child (2017; director, series composition)
- Restaurant to Another World (2017–2021; director, series composition)
- Senryu Girl (2019; director, series composition)
- Room Camp (2020; director)
- White Cat Project: Zero Chronicle (2020; director, series composition)
- Super HxEros (2020; director, series composition)
- Azur Lane: Slow Ahead! (2021; director)
- The Rising of the Shield Hero 2 (2022; director)
- Legend of Mana: The Teardrop Crystal (2022; director, series composition)
- The Quintessential Quintuplets* (2024; director, series composition)
- Ghost Concert: Missing Songs (2026; director, series composition)
- Millennium Family (TBA; director, series composition)

=== Films ===
- Chaos;Child: Silent Sky (2017; director, series composition)
- The Quintessential Quintuplets Movie (2022; director)

=== Original video animation ===
- Shakugan no Shana S (2010; episode director)
- Otome wa Boku ni Koishiteru: Futari no Elder (2012; episode director, storyboards)
- Nozo × Kimi (2014–2015; director)

=== Web series ===
- Hito Ken Mamoru-kun to Ayumi-chan "Sekai o Shiawase ni" (2005; director)
- Kyō no Asuka Show (2012; series director)
