= Shomin Sample =

Japanese light novel series

- Light novel volume 1 cover, featuring Aika Tenkubashi

俺がお嬢様学校に「庶民サンプル」として拉致られた件 (Ore ga Ojōsama Gakkō ni "Shomin Sanpuru" Toshite Rachirareta Ken)
- Genre: Harem; Romantic comedy
- Light novel
- Written by: Takafumi Nanatsuki
- Illustrated by: Gekka Uruu
- Published by: Ichijinsha
- Imprint: Ichijinsha Bunko
- Original run: November 11, 2011 – July 20, 2016
- Volumes: 11 + 1 extra
- Manga
- Written by: Takafumi Nanatsuki
- Illustrated by: Risumai
- Published by: Ichijinsha
- English publisher: NA: Seven Seas Entertainment
- Magazine: Comic Rex
- Original run: May 27, 2012 – September 27, 2018
- Volumes: 15
- Anime television series
- Directed by: Masato Jinbo
- Written by: Kento Shimoyama
- Music by: Hiromi Mizutani
- Studio: Silver Link
- Licensed by: Crunchyroll (Note: Formerly known as Funimation.); BI: Anime Limited (Note: On behalf of Crunchyroll LLC.)
- Original network: AT-X, Tokyo MX, Sun TV, KBS, BS Fuji
- English network: UK: Animax; US: Funimation Channel, Crunchyroll Channel
- Original run: October 7, 2015 – December 23, 2015
- Episodes: 12
- Manga

Shomin Sample: I Was Spun Off by an Elite All-Girls School as a Sample Commoner
- Written by: Takafumi Nanatsuki
- Illustrated by: Risumai
- Published by: Ichijinsha
- Magazine: Comic Rex
- Original run: January 27, 2016 – July 27, 2016
- Volumes: 2
- icon

Shomin Sample: I Was Abducted by an Elite All-Girls School as a Sample Commoner (Japanese: 俺がお嬢様学校に「庶民サンプル」として拉致られた件, Hepburn: Ore ga Ojōsama Gakkō ni "Shomin Sanpuru" Toshite Rachirareta Ken) is a Japanese light novel series written by Takafumi Nanatsuki, with illustrations by Gekka Uruu. It was published by Ichijinsha in eleven volumes from December 2011 to July 2016. The series follows Kimito Kagurazaka, an ordinary high school student abducted by an organization, and forced to enroll in a private academy for elite young ladies.

A manga adaptation by Risumai was serialied in Ichijinsha's Comic Rex magazine from May 2012 to September 2018. A drama CD was released on February 20, 2013. An anime television series adaptation, produced by Silver Link, aired from October to December 2015.

== Plot ==
Kimito Kagurazaka is an ordinary high school student. One day, he is forcefully enrolled in the elite all-girls school Seikain, where its sheltered noble female students are cut off from the rest of the world to preserve their innocence. However, this deep isolation leaves a large number of school graduates unable to cope with the outside world. To deal with this problem, the school has decided to kidnap a male commoner, Kimito, hoping that his "common man's" influence will be a gentle way to introduce the girls to the realities of life outside. Unfortunately for Kimito, the school only considered him a candidate for this project because they thought that he was a homosexual with a muscle fetish. Therefore, the school concluded that Kimito is no threat to the innocent girls' chastity. Once he learns that he either will face castration or exile should this be proven otherwise, he has no choice but to cooperate. Soon after his enrollment, he has a fateful meeting with Aika Tenkūbashi. Aika is a student who can alternately be shy, stubborn, and pretentious. She is also innocently fascinated by the outside world.

== Characters ==
Kimito Kagurazaka (神楽坂 公人, Kagurazaka Kimito)
Voiced by: Kaito Ishikawa (drama CD), Atsushi Tamaru (anime) (Japanese); Dallas Reid (English)
He is a commoner who is kidnapped and forced to enroll at Seikain. Kimito immediately notices how detached the girls are from the outside world. His first informal speech at the commencement ceremony leaves them flabbergasted. Seeing a cell phone for the first time excites the girls far more than it should. Kimito has a thing for girls' thighs. The staff has falsely announced to the school that he is a homosexual with a muscle fetish to protect the girls' pride and chastity. To help offset the strain of living up to his false credentials, his room in the school dormitory is renovated to look exactly like his bedroom at his family's home. He and Aika often chat in his room, where he enjoys trolling her with jokes about real-life topics that exploit her tendency for pretension as well as her very real innocence. As the series progresses, his childhood memories begin to resurfaces, thus experiencing a reunion with Miyuki and Aika, although Kimito's girl problems continue in the end.
Aika Tenkūbashi (天空橋 愛佳, Tenkūbashi Aika)
Voiced by: Asami Seto (drama CD), Yū Serizawa (anime) (Japanese); Sarah Wiedenheft (English)
She is childish, naive, and shy about talking to others. This distances her from them even though she wishes to be popular among her peers. Aika is strongly fascinated of the outside world. The PSP, ramen, and manga are a few of her interests. She asks Kimito to teach her how to be a commoner. Aika declares the establishment of the Commoner Club with Kimito as the master. She seems to have feelings for Kimito beyond that of master and disciple. However, it is shown in a flashback to her childhood that a young boy (Kimito) once helped her escape to see the wonderful things the outside world had to offer. When Aika's family goes bankrupt she is expelled from Seikain. In a surprise turn of events, her parents beg Kimito's family to let them stay at their renovated house for the time-being. During a short period in the outside world, Kimito and Aika get closer, then Aika's father becomes chairman in another company, allowing her to go back to Seikain. Later on, Kimito and Aika has both confess to each other during Christmas and are dating.
Reiko Arisugawa (有栖川 麗子, Arisugawa Reiko)
Voiced by: Ai Kayano (drama CD), Rika Tachibana (anime) (Japanese); Mikaela Krantz (English)
Reiko is considered the most innocent, polite, and cheerful girl in the school. Because of his earnest attempts to help her and the other girls with learning the Commoner Way, she quickly grows fond of Kimito and falls in love with him. She is someone who always acts positive although has a horrible singing voice. However, her personality drastically changes when she learns about Aika's idea for helping her reconcile with her friends and classmates after a certain uncharacteristic outburst. She could not accept Aika's unexpected help and bitterly confronts her for her pity actions. In the end, the situation is resolved amiably. In turn, this breeds a rivalry for Kimito's affections. Reiko joins the Commoner Club to stay close to Kimito and interfere with the advances of other girls.
Hakua Shiodome (汐留 白亜, Shiodome Hakua)
Voiced by: Rina Hidaka (drama CD), Yūki Kuwahara (anime) (Japanese); Jeannie Tirado (English)
Hakua is a short, soft-spoken, and extremely youthful child prodigy who was very antisocial until she grows attached to Kimito, which shocks her maids. Due to her childlike appearance, Hakua is commonly mistaken for an elementary school student, however she is in-fact 14 years old. Hakua is a genius in the fields of engineering, mathematics, and sciences. She will occasionally go into strange dazes and at such times, she wriggles out of her clothes as she writes, much to her friends dismay. She habitually documents new equations on any convenient wall. Hakua's maids photograph and document all of her work, as her intellect could lead to many break throughs in the fields of science and mathematics. Her family owns a cellular phone company. Hakua's maids tend to get her and Kimito into intimate moments. Whenever Hakua is with the girls and Kimito in his room or when her and Kimito are alone, she has a tendency to sit in his lap to which the latter does not mind.
Karen Jinryō (神領 可憐, Jinryō Karen)
Voiced by: Sachika Misawa (drama CD), Chitose Morinaga (anime) (Japanese); Skyler Davenport (English)
Karen is a girl from a samurai family who carries a katana on school grounds. Her fear of insects causes her to reflexively slash others nearby even though their clothes are often the primary casualties. After Karen inadvertently experiences a humiliating defeat at the hands of Kimito, she believes herself to have become weak and swears to stick closely by his side. She is determined to kill him whenever a chance presents itself. She like Aika is a typical tsundere (although more aggressive) and she masks her feelings for Kimito with a fake desire to defeat him. She is sexually attracted towards Hakua. There came a point where Karen felt overexcited for displaying her full potential the first time when invading Reiko's wedding arrangement.
Miyuki Kujō (九条 みゆき, Kujō Miyuki)
Voiced by: Aoi Yūki (drama CD), Saori Ōnishi (anime) (Japanese); Mallorie Rodak (English)
Kimito's personal and head maid (in name only). She is a very sadistic person, often carries out severe punishment whenever Kimito commits a blunder, yet she secretly kisses him in the morning to wake him up. Miyuki knows Kimito because he switched places with her older brother Itsuki (whose face resembles Kimito's but is really aggressive) when they were young to comprehend each other's worlds, and she becomes attracted to him. After switching back; however, Kimito developed a terrible fever which causes him to lose the memories of the events. Soon, Kimito dreams of his past enough to remember Miyuki, having her smile again in a long time.
Eri Hanae (花江 恵理, Hanae Eri)
Voiced by: Yumi Hara (Japanese); Jad Saxton (English)
Kimito's childhood friend and an idol voice actress. For unknown reasons, she claims to be his girlfriend and is upset about his sudden transfer away from home. In middle school, she was bullied for her unique voice, but Kimito told her that she could become a voice actress. Due to a misunderstanding, she believes that Kimito would not reciprocate her feelings, and so she lied wildly about Kimito being homosexual just to have him to herself, which unintentionally led him to be chosen to enroll at Seikain. She later becomes the second commoner sample as part of a deal after finding her way to Seikain in the hopes of bringing Kimito back.
Sakimori (崎守, Sakimori)
Voiced by: Ayumi Fujimura (Japanese); Sara Ragsdale (English)
Hakua's personal maid. She also documents everything that Hakua tendency writes. Unlike the other maids, Sakimori is opening minded about leaving Hakua under Kimito's care. In an extra chapter, Kimito dreams about being married to Sakimori, with a daughter named Yukari, whom a grownup Hakua occasionally visits to tutor.
Sayuri Kimachi (来待 早百合, Kimachi Sayuri)
Voiced by: Takako Honda (Japanese); Heather Walker (English)
Principal of Seikain Girls Academy.
Sumire Kiryuu (霧生 菫, Kiryū Sumire)
Voiced by: Yūki Kaneko (Japanese); Dawn M. Bennett (English)
Reiko's personal maid.
Hōko Arisugawa (有栖川 法子, Arisugawa Hōko)
Voiced by: Ayumi Tsunematsu (Japanese); Colleen Clinkenbeard (English)
Masaomi and Reiko's Mother.
Masaomi Arisugawa (有栖川正臣, Arisugawa Masaomi)
Voiced by: Kousuke Toriumi (Japanese); Austin Tindle (English)
Reiko's older brother who is very protective of his sister, resulting in having a sister complex. He is firmly against Reiko's arranged marriage and turns to Kimito for help.
Maya Mibu (壬生 マヤ, Mibu Maya)
Voiced by: Risae Matsuda (Japanese); Alexis Tipton (English)
A friend to Reiko.
Mizuho Suehiro (末広 みずほ, Suehiro Mizuho)
Voiced by: Shiori Sugiura (Japanese); Megan Shipman (English)
She is also a friend to Reiko.
Kae Tōjō (東城 香絵, Tōjō Kae)
Voiced by: Yūka Aisaka (Japanese); Felecia Angelle (English)
She is another friend to Reiko.
Misaki Yamada (山田 みさき, Yamada Misaki)
Voiced by: Kaya Okuno (Japanese); Bryn Apprill (English)
She works along with Eri in a few projects.

== Media ==
=== Light novel ===
Written by Takafumi Nanatsuki, with illustrations by Gekka Uruu, Shomin Sample was published by Ichijinsha in eleven volumes from November 11, 2011, to July 20, 2016. An additional volume, numbered 7.5, was released on January 18, 2014.

=== Manga ===
A manga adaptation illustrated by Risumait hat was published in the manga magazine Comic Rex from May 27, 2012, to September 27, 2018. Fifteen bound volumes in total were published by Ichijinsha.Shomin Sample.

The manga adaptation was licensed for English release in North America by Seven Seas Entertainment. The volumes were released from 2016 to 2021. In addition to the main manga series, a short spinoff called Shomin Sample: I Was Spun Off by an Elite All-Girls School as a Sample Commoner also appeared as a serial in Comic Rex. Two bound volumes were published by Ichijinsha and were released between January–July 2016. The title uses a pun of the word "spinoff" where supinofu (拉致; "abducted") is replaced by (スピンオフ; "spunoff").

=== Anime ===
A 12-episode anime television series adaptation, directed by Masato Jinbo and animated by studio Silver Link. It aired in Japan from October 7 to December 23, 2015. The anime has been licensed by Funimation in North America and Madman Entertainment in Australia. On November 11, 2015, Funimation began streaming the English dubbed episodes as part of its Broadcast Dubs initiative. Anime Limited is distributing the title for Funimation in the United Kingdom and Ireland.

==== Episodes ====
No.	Title	Original release date
1	"Welcome, Commoner"; Transliteration: "Yōkoso shomin" (Japanese: ようこそ庶民)	October 7, 2015
High school student Kimito Kagurazaka is abruptly kidnapped from school by extremely muscular men and deposited at the Seikan School for girls. He learns from Head Maid Miyuki Kojo that the school is a well-kept secret academy for the daughters of extremely wealthy families. However, due to being cut off from the realities of the outside world, many of their students become antisocial shut-ins upon graduation. Kimito has been selected as the school's first-ever gay male student or Shomin Sample to remedy this. However, there is a problem, not only is Kimito not gay, he has a fetish for women's thighs. Therefore, to preserve the purity of the female students, Kimito must either masquerade as a gay man with a muscle fetish or face the wrath of Head Maid Miyuki and her giant scissors. Upon entering the classroom, Kimito meets trendy student Reiko Arisugawa and extremely naïve and antisocial student Aika Tenkubashi with whom he forms the first "Commoners Club."
2	"Reiko Is Who We Wish to Be Like"; Transliteration: "Reiko-sama wa watashi-tachi no akogare desu wa" (Japanese: 麗子様は私たちの憧れですわ)	October 14, 2015
Kimito is abruptly awoken from sleep by Miyuki, who professes her wish that he had never woken up. Many of the girls in his class are extremely impressed with his commoner ways, including cell phones, handheld games, athletic abilities, and "commoner food," i.e. Ramen. During a welcoming party in his honour Kimito manages to waltz with Reiko without embarrassing himself. Aika is introduced to manga for the first time and falls for Kimito's prank, where she becomes convinced she has the ability to freeze time, during which she not only flashes Kimito her panties but almost kisses him. Later, following a naked accident in the shower, Reiko becomes convinced she must now marry Kimito, an idea she finds most appealing.
3	"It Was Like the Garden of Eden"; Transliteration: "Eden no sono tte kanji datta" (Japanese: エデンの園ってカンジだった)	October 21, 2015
Kimito learns that his parents had been heavily bribed to allow him to attend Seikan. He later stumbles upon youthful-looking student Hakua Shiodome who strips naked while scribbling scientific notes on a statue. Following a ramen meal in his room, Hakua begins to strip once again, where Aika gets the wrong idea. Kimito returns Hakua to her laboratory, where he learns not only is Hakua as old as he is, she is a super genius and is now very attached to him, to the delight of her maids. Kimito meets the entomophobic katana-wielding martial artist Karen Jinryo who, through a misunderstanding, is defeated by Kimito in a naked duel. She swears loyalty as his slave until she becomes strong enough to kill him and joins the commoners club, where she becomes strangely interested in Hakua and the idea of selfies.
4	"The Tea Party Incident"; Transliteration: "O-chakai jiken" (Japanese: お茶会事件)	October 28, 2015
Reiko invites Kimito to a tea party in her room, but he declines as he already had plans with Aika. This later causes Reiko to uncharacteristically shout at her friends, upsetting them. Meanwhile, Kimito helps Aika plan a "commoners party" so Aika can make friends. Hakua helps by providing free cell phones she helped design so everyone in the class can text each other. However, on learning of Reiko's plight, Aika secretly allows Reiko to host the party to apologize to her friends. When Kimito tells Reiko about Aika's plan, she gets upset and argues with Aika about her antisocial behavior and they get into fight. Kimito tries to stop them, but Aika throws a pillow at him. She and Reiko both stop fighting after Aika realizes what she did and they put their differences aside. Reiko and Hakua officially join the Commoners Club. Miyuki is not impressed to find four girls in Kimito's room, and Kimito has to act quickly to avoid the giant scissors.
5	"Just Friends"; Transliteration: "Tomodachi dake" (Japanese: 友達だけ)	November 4, 2015
Kimito's childhood friend, selfish teen idol Eri Hanae, who originally lied about Kimito's sexual preferences, angrily wonders where Kimito has vanished to. Kimito wakes up to find Hakua asleep naked in his bed. While teaching her how to cook potato cakes, she once again strips naked while scribbling notes on the wall. Following a game of riddles which Hakua is surprisingly bad at, Kimito returns her to her lab, after which Hakua is embarrassed when Kimito sees she has a plushie of him on her bed. Meanwhile, the other girls, jealous of how close Hakua is to Kimito, attempt to become closer to Hakua so she spends less time with Kimito. Later, Reiko and Aika read manga together in Kimito's room before an accident with a soft drink that requires them to strip down to their underwear. A fight breaks out just in time for Kimito to witness the two girls on his bed together in their underwear. He quickly flees from the room, as Aika desperately tries to clear up the misunderstanding.
6	"Step Outside"; Transliteration: "Omote ni dero" (Japanese: 表に出ろ)	November 11, 2015
To help their students get used to commoner life, Seikan takes everybody to the specially built Shomin Land that contains a fake commoner city street complete with shops and restaurants where the girls can learn such things as crossing the road and ordering food at a counter. Despite Kimito noticing numerous things wrong with the fake setting, he uses it as another chance for Aika to become popular. Elsewhere, Hakua is upset to learn Kimito has gone on the trip and cannot spend the day with her.
7	"The Tsun-Pure In Her Element"; Transliteration: "Tsunpyua-san no honryō" (Japanese: ツンピュアさんの本領)	November 18, 2015
Whilst still on the school trip, Aika has become extremely popular due to her knowledge of commoner culture. Meanwhile, Kimito, realising Karen is secretly afraid of his fighting skills, manages to convince her to try on some revealing clothes she secretly likes. Karen is shocked to learn Kimito finds her attractive. Reiko and Aika become closer as friends. The next day, Kimito is again awoken by Miyuki, who wishes he had not woken up. Kimito attends an outdoor bath only to realise Aika and her new friends also wish to bathe. Kimito is forced to hide underwater in a spot Aika finds a little embarrassing. Finding that Kimito has almost drowned, Aika desperately uses the kiss of life, spawning a rumour that they are dating, which Karen is not happy about. Back at Seikan, it is revealed Head Maid Miyuki has been waking Kimito every morning with a kiss, the real reason she wishes he would stay asleep.
8	"Aika-sama Has a Lot of Friends"; Transliteration: "Aika-sama wa tomodachi ga ōi" (Japanese: 愛佳様は友達が多い)	November 25, 2015
Kimito introduces Aika to a fortune telling game on his cell phone. Now obsessed with such games, the girls compete to find out which of them would be best suited to one day marry Kimito. To everyone's surprise, Karen and Kimito are given a 100% relationship rating. The next day Kimito is once more awoken by Miyuki, who reacts rather aggressively when he asks if his alarm can wake him in the future. Karen invites Kimito to her room on the pretext of repairing a shirt she damages on purpose. Upon entering her room, Karen immediately changes into the revealing clothes Kimito had earlier complimented. As the two become closer, they are almost discovered by the others, forcing both Karen and Kimito to hide in the closet, where Kimito gets closer than he ever dreamed to Karen's thighs. However, they are soon discovered, and Kimito is quick to scramble for an explanation.
9	"Kagurazaka-sama Is Here"; Transliteration: "Kagurazaka-sama ga kiteru no yo" (Japanese: 神楽坂様が来てるのよっ)	December 2, 2015
Kimito introduces the girls to the concept of a Maid café, which confuses the girls who are used to being surrounded by maids daily. To better understand, the girls dress as maids and attempt to serve Kimito in the role of a café customer. It appears to be a success until Reiko attempts to sing. Hakua, depressed over her poor compatibility rating with Kimito, invites him to spend the day with her so he can get to know her better, much to the delight of her maids who come up with numerous ways of bringing the two closer together. However, their plans are brought to a swift end with the arrival of Miyuki. Nevertheless, the other maids celebrate having brought Hakua and Kimito closer together.
10	"I've Been Curious About This For a While, But What is Gets?"; Transliteration: "Mae kara ki ni natteitan dakedo, gettsu tte nan'na no?" (Japanese: 前から気になっていたんだけど、ゲッツってなんなの？)	December 9, 2015
Kimito's attempt to pull a prank on the naïve Aika results in a new fad spreading throughout the entire school, which, due to the students being cut off from popular culture, could last for up to ten years. Kimito has an accidental encounter with Miyuki's panties. Reiko later overhears Kimito on the phone with one of his friends and deduces that Kimito misses being able to socialize with other men and may try to leave Seikan. To remedy this, the girls decide to act more manly so he won't leave. Kimito assures them he never planned to leave; he just misses his old friends.
11	"Is This Not the Sky That Kimito-sama Was Looking At?"; Transliteration: "Kimito-sama no miteita sora wa kō de wa arimasen no?" (Japanese: 公人様の見ていた空はこうではありませんの？)	December 16, 2015
Reiko and Kimito share a pleasant moment together in the classroom. Later both Reiko and Kimito are summoned to a meeting with Reiko's mother, Hoko, and brother, Masaomi, who is revealed to have a major sister complex and shows an immediate dislike of how close Kimito is to Reiko. Reiko's mother informs Reiko that she has arranged for her to marry the son of one of her business associates, and she is to leave Seikan immediately to attend a meeting with her future husband. Kimito and the girls are devastated at the news, but feel they cannot interfere. However, they find an ally in Masaomi, who, for obvious reasons, also does not want Reiko to get married. He arranges to smuggle them out of the academy grounds in his car to stop the meeting.
12	"Inexperienced Though I Am, Please Accept Me Forever"; Transliteration: "Futsutsuka-mono desu ga, suenagaku onegai itashimasu" (Japanese: 不束者ですが、末永くお願い致します)	December 23, 2015
Kimito, Karen, Aika, Hakua, and Masaomi arrive at the meeting place, which is heavily guarded. Karen immediately deals with the front gates and the guards while Masaomi faces off with his martial arts instructor, Takemiya. Kimito, Hakua, and Aika head inside, where Hakua hacks the security system. Kimito and Aika, with help from the maids and the muscle men, make it to the room where the meeting is taking place. Kimito pleads with Reiko's mother to call off the meeting. Inspired by Kimito's words, Reiko refuses to get married, even though she would be disowned from her family and no longer able to attend Seikan. However, as Kimito promises he will take care of her instead, the marriage is called off, and Reiko is allowed to attend Seikan. However, Kimito's promise is taken as a marriage proposal, and he is now engaged to Reiko. Reiko's mother promises to let them get married but only so she can make his life hell every day until he divorces her. Back at Seikan, Kimito apologizes for the misunderstanding, and normal club activities resume as Kimito's bedroom descends once more into chaos.

== Reception ==
Ichijinsha announced on Thursday that Takafumi Nanatsuki's light novel Ore ga Ojō-sama Gakkō ni "Shomin Sample" Toshite Rachirareta Ken (Story in Which I Was Kidnapped by a Young Lady's School to be a "Sample of the Common People") will get an anime adaptation.

Ichijinsha published the first volume of the light novel series in November 2011, and it ran for eight volumes. A special edition of the seventh volume bundled a drama CD. Gekka Urū designed the characters for the light novel and Risumai draws a manga adaptation that is serialized in Ichijinsha's Monthly Comic Rex. The fifth compiled volume will ship on July 18 in Japan.
