= Koji Nakano =

Koji Nakano may refer to:

- Koji Nakano (composer) (中野 浩二, born 1974), Japanese composer
- Koji Nakano (water polo) (中野 皓司, born 1947), Japanese water polo player
- Kōji Nakano (writer) (中野 孝次, 1925–2004), Japanese writer, translator and literary critic
