= Terri Doty =

American voice actress

- Born: Philadelphia, Pennsylvania, U.S.
- Occupations: Voice actress; voice director; ADR writer
- Years active: 2008–present
- Spouse: Stephen Hoff
- Website: www.terridoty.com

Terri Doty is an American voice actress, voice director, and ADR writer known for her voice work in English dubs of Japanese anime series and video games.

== Career ==
In anime, Doty is known for her work as Minare Koda in Wave, Listen to Me!, Tsuki Uzaki in Uzaki-chan Wants to Hang Out!, Moriko Morioka in Recovery of an MMO Junkie, Kyoko Machi in Interviews with Monster Girls, Kirara Hazama from the Assassination Classroom series, and Chutaro Kumo in Laughing Under the Clouds.

=== That Anime Show ===
On January 16, 2010, Doty teamed up with J. Michael Tatum and Stephen Hoff to start That Anime Show, a podcast that interviews fellow voice actors and members of the English anime dub industry. The podcast ran for 54 episodes with its final episode released on January 19, 2014.

=== Obscure Chatter ===
In June 2019, Doty started a new podcast called Obscure Chatter. This podcast started like a one-on-on interview with friends and other entertainers, but changed after COVID to more of a radio talk show format. That Anime Show episodes are also now re-released as "TAS Rewind" through Obscure Chatter.

== Personal life ==
Doty was born in Philadelphia, Pennsylvania, to a father of English descent and a mother of Mexican descent. She is married to voice director, producer, and audio engineer Stephen Hoff, who works for Christopher Sabat at the latter's studio, OkraTron5000. She is a former film student and is a fan of horror films. In 2017, Doty released a science fiction novel called One of Few. Doty is pansexual.

== Filmography ==
=== Anime ===
List of dubbing performances in anime
Year	Title	Role	Notes	Source
2009	Big Windup!	Chika Fukami, Suyama's Mother	Voice director	
2009	A Certain Scientific Railgun	Mako		
2009	Hetalia: The Beautiful World	Female Germany		
2009	One Piece	Young Franky		
2009	Romeo × Juliet	Annie Chapman		
2010	Corpse Princess	Kamika Todoroki	Voice director, scriptwriter	
2010	Legend of the Legendary Heroes	Naia Knolles		
2010	Rin ~ Daughters of Mnemosyne	Informant's Assistant	Voice director	
2010	Initial D		Funimation dub (season 4); Scriptwriter	
2010	Dance in the Vampire Bund	Nella / Jiji		
2010	A Certain Magical Index II	Nancy		
2011–2019	Fairy Tail	Virgo, Young Jellal, Young Mystogan		
2011	Deadman Wonderland	Ohara		
2011	Fractale	Tsunami		
2011	Rideback	Voicemail	Voice director	
2011	Baka and Test	Yuka Koyama	Voice director	
2011	Black Butler	Maria		
2011	Guilty Crown	Triton		
2011	Maken-ki!	Yang Ming		
2011	We Without Wings – Under the Innocent Sky	Masato		
2012	Aesthetica of a Rogue Hero	Valkyrie		
2012	Okami-san and Her Seven Companions	Alice Kiriki		
2012	Good Luck Girl!	Yusuke		
2012	Kamisama Kiss	Chiyomaru		
2012	Sankarea: Undying Love	Kusakabe		
2012	Level E	Yoshiki Shimizu		
2013	Last Exile: Fam, the Silver Wing	Elio		
2013	Divine Gate	Young Arthur		
2013	High School DxD	Siris		
2013	Tokyo Ravens	Reisen		
2014	Dragonar Academy	Young Ash		
2014	Garo: The Animation	Angelina		
2014	Laughing Under the Clouds	Chutaro Kumoi		
2014	Lord Marksman and Vanadis	Lunie		
2014	Ping Pong: The Animation	Young Ryuichi		
2014	Space Dandy	Jack		
2014	Tokyo Ghoul	Young Ayato		
2015	Assassination Classroom series	Kirara Hazama	also season 2 and Koro Sensei Quest	
2015	Muv Luv Alternative: Total Eclipse	Tarisa Manadal		
2015	Danganronpa: the Animation	Makoto's Mother		
2015	Parasyte	Yuko Tachikawa		
2015	Valkyrie Drive: Mermaid	Saejima		
2015	Blood Blockade Battlefront & Beyond	Veded		
2015	Castle Town Dandelion	Young Shu		
2015	The Rolling Girls	Rikako		
2015	Ultimate Otaku Teacher	Kazuya Momozono		
2015	Yurikuma Arashi	Kumako		
2016	Daylight's End	Newscaster		
2016	When Supernatural Battles Became Commonplace	Madoka Kuki		
2016	Alderamin on the Sky	Young Ikta		
2016	Handa-kun	Juri		
2016	And you thought there is never a girl online?	Limit		
2016	Brave Witches	Takeko Karibuchi		
2016	Terror in Resonance	Wakamoto		
2016	Hina Logic – from Luck & Logic	Michael		
2016	Keijo!!!!!!!!	Kei Higuchi		
2016	Monster Hunter Stories: Ride On	Ralph		
2016	Show By Rock!!	Pig Macaron		
2017	Code Geass: Akito the Exiled	Sophie Randle		
2017	Interviews with Monster Girls	Kyoko Machi		
2017	Kenka Bancho Otome	Hikari Onigashima		
2017	Recovery of an MMO Junkie	Moriko Morioka		
2017	Akiba's Trip: The Animation	Hoshino Tsukiyama		
2017	ēlDLIVE	Marley		
2017	Masamune-kun's Revenge	Shido		
2017	Robotics;Notes	Young Kaito		
2018	Junji Ito Collection	Fuchi		
2018	Ace Attorney	Misty Fey	anime series	
2018	The Ancient Magus' Bride	Ui		
2018	Made in Abyss	Shiggy		
2018	Golden Kamuy	Kano Ienaga		
2018	Citrus	Ume Aihara		
2019-present	Fruits Basket	Mai Iwata, "Art" Artemis Donpanina Talos, Additional Voices	2019 reboot	
2019	Dragon Ball Super	Jiren (child)		
2020	Azur Lane	Takao, Hood		
2020	Bofuri	Mii		
2020	Asteroid in Love	Mikage Sakurai		
2020	Kakushigoto	Kumi Jōro		
2020–Present	Uzaki-chan Wants to Hang Out!	Tsuki Uzaki		
2021	That Time I Got Reincarnated as a Slime	Suphia		
2021	Wave, Listen to Me!	Minare Koda		
2021	Sakura Wars the Animation	Leyla M. Ruzhkova		
2021	Kageki Shojo!!	Risa Nakayama		
2021	Rumble Garanndoll	Misa		
2022	The Case Study of Vanitas	Louise		
2022	Life with an Ordinary Guy Who Reincarnated into a Total Fantasy Knockout	Lucius		
2023	Shy	Stardust (Young)		
2024	A Condition Called Love	Kagari		
2024	Fairy Tail: 100 Years Quest	Virgo		
2025	The Shiunji Family Children	Kotono		
2026	You and I Are Polar Opposites	Suzuki's Mom		
2026	Magical Explorer	Yukine Mizumori		

List of dubbing performances in films
Year	Title	Role	Notes	Source
2017	Donten: Laughing Under the Clouds - Gaiden: Chapter 1 - One Year After the Battle	Chutaro		
2018	Donten: Laughing Under the Clouds - Gaiden: Chapter 2 - The Tragedy of Fuuma Ninja Tribe	Chutaro		
2018	Donten: Laughing Under the Clouds - Gaiden: Chapter 3 - Conspiracy of the Military	Chutaro		
2019	Made in Abyss: Journey's Dawn	Shiggy		
2019	Made in Abyss: Wandering Twilight	Shiggy		
2019	Dragon Ball Super: Broly	Nion		
2022	The Quintessential Quintuplets Movie	Futaro Uesugi (young)		

=== Video games ===
List of performances in video games
Year	Title	Role	Notes	Source
2012	Princess Battles	Cyra		
2014	Wasteland 2	Kate Preston		
2016	Backstage Pass	Rachel		
2016	Paladins	High Elf Lian		
2019	Borderlands 3	Betty		
2020	Visage	Claire		
2020	My Hero: One's Justice 2	Young Kai Chisaki		
2022	Tiny Tina's Wonderlands	Goblin Witch		
2022	Dragon Ball: The Breakers	Xiaon		

=== Podcasts ===
List of podcast performances
Year	Title	Role	Notes	Source
2010–2014	That Anime Show	Producer, Creator & Host		
2019–Present	Obscure Chatter	Producer, Creator & Host		

== Books ==
- One of Few (Perpetually Offbeat, 2017) ISBN 978-0998108308
