= Nakano Station =

Nakano Station (中野駅; Nakano Eki) is the name of three train stations in Japan.

- Nakano Station (Gunma) in Midori, Gunma Prefecture
- Nakano Station (Nagano) in Ueda, Nagano Prefecture
- Nakano Station (Tokyo) in Nakano, Tokyo

Other similarly named stations include:

- Aki-Nakano Station in Aki-ku, Hiroshima, Hiroshima Prefecture
- Kazusa-Nakano Station in Otaki, Isumi District, Chiba Prefecture
- Rikuchu-Nakano Station in Kunohe District, Iwate Prefecture
- Shinshū-Nakano Station in Nakano, Nagano Prefecture
- Nakano Sakaue Station

Station formerly called Nakano Station (名香野駅):

- Nishitetsu Chihaya Station in Higashi-ku, Fukuoka, Fukuoka Prefecture
