= Negi Haruba =

Japanese manga artist

Negi Haruba 春場 ねぎ
- Born: July 27, 1991 (age 35) Japan
- Area: Manga artist
- Notable works: Karma of Purgatory; The Quintessential Quintuplets; Go! Go! Loser Ranger!

Negi Haruba (春場 ねぎ, Haruba Negi; born July 27, 1991) is a Japanese manga artist. He is best known as the creator of his smash-hit manga The Quintessential Quintuplets, which was serialized in Kodansha's Weekly Shōnen Magazine from August 2017 to February 2020. In May 2019, he won the award for Best Shōnen Manga at the 43rd annual Kodansha Manga Awards, alongside Ōima Yoshitoki's To Your Eternity. It was the fifth best-selling manga in Japan in 2019.

According to Haruba, his pen name (Note: The kanji for Haruba (春場) can be translated to "springfield".) comes from the protagonist of Negima! Magister Negi Magi, Negi Springfield. On the award ceremony of the 43rd annual Kodansha Manga Awards, Haruba said it was "special to him" to be selected by Ken Akamatsu, who was one of the judges of the award and the creator of Negima! Magister Negi Magi.

== Works ==
=== Serials ===
- Karma of Purgatory (煉獄のカルマ, Rengoku no Karuma) (Story: Shun Hirose, Weekly Shōnen Magazine, 2014–2015)
- The Quintessential Quintuplets (五等分の花嫁, Go-Tōbun no Hanayome) (Weekly Shōnen Magazine, 2017–2020)
- Go! Go! Loser Ranger! (戦隊大失格, Sentai Daishikkaku) (Weekly Shōnen Magazine, 2021–ongoing)

=== One-shots ===
- Coward-Cross-World (Magazine SPECIAL 2013 Issue 4)
- Ura Sekai Communication (Monthly Comic Dengeki Daioh, September, 2014)
- Vampire Killer (Weekly Shōnen Magazine, 2016 Merger Issue 2 and 3)
- Go-Tōbun no Hanayome (Weekly Shōnen Magazine, 2017 Issue 8)

=== Character design ===
- Pon no Michi anime (original character designs)
