= The Quintessential Quintuplets =

Japanese manga series by Negi Haruba

- First tankōbon volume cover, featuring the Nakano quintuplets

五等分の花嫁 (Go-Tōbun no Hanayome)
- Genre: Harem; Romantic comedy
- Manga
- Written by: Negi Haruba
- Published by: Kodansha
- English publisher: NA: Kodansha USA
- Imprint: Shōnen Magazine Comics
- Magazine: Weekly Shōnen Magazine
- Original run: August 9, 2017 – February 19, 2020
- Volumes: 14
- Anime television series
- Directed by: Satoshi Kuwabara
- Produced by: Gōta Aijima; Shin Furukawa; Junichirō Tanaka; Shinichi Nakamura; Yasuhiro Takano
- Written by: Keiichirō Ōchi
- Music by: Hanae Nakamura; Miki Sakurai; Natsumi Tabuchi
- Studio: Tezuka Productions
- Licensed by: Crunchyroll
- Original network: TBS, SUN, BS-TBS
- Original run: January 10, 2019 – March 28, 2019
- Episodes: 12
- Anime television series

The Quintessential Quintuplets II (Note: Known in Japan as Go-tōbun no Hanayome ∬ (五等分の花嫁∬))
- Directed by: Kaori
- Produced by: Gōta Aijima; Shin Furukawa; Junichirō Tanaka; Yūichi Izumi; Takaaki Nakanome; Mitsutoshi Ogura; Tomoyuki Oowada; Tomoki Ueda; Kento Yoshida
- Written by: Keiichirō Ōchi
- Music by: Hanae Nakamura; Miki Sakurai
- Studio: Bibury Animation Studios
- Licensed by: Crunchyroll; SEA: Children's Playground Entertainment
- Original network: TBS, SUN, BS11
- Original run: January 8, 2021 – March 26, 2021
- Episodes: 12
- Anime film
- The Quintessential Quintuplets Movie (2022)
- Anime television series

The Quintessential Quintuplets∽
- Directed by: Yukihiro Miyamoto
- Produced by: Shin Furukawa; Junichirō Tanaka; Mitsutoshi Ogura; Tomoyuki Oowada; Tomoki Ueda; Kento Yoshida; Kazuhiko Hidano; Takahiro Suzuki; Tatsuya Ueki
- Written by: Keiichirō Ōchi
- Music by: Hanae Nakamura; Miki Sakurai
- Studio: Shaft
- Licensed by: Crunchyroll
- Original network: TBS, BS11
- Original run: September 2, 2023 – September 9, 2023 (Note: The special received a 48-minute special theatrical screening on July 14, 2023.)
- Episodes: 2
- Anime television series

The Quintessential Quintuplets*
- Directed by: Masato Jinbo
- Produced by: Shin Furukawa; Junichirou Tanaka; Mitsutoshi Ogura; Tomoyuki Oowada; Tomoki Ueda; Tatsuya Ueki; Takahiro Suzuki; Tsunehisa Maruyama; Kouta Kimizuka
- Written by: Masato Jinbo (Note: Screenplay Concept (脚本原案) by Negi Haruba.)
- Music by: Hanae Nakamura; Miki Sakurai; Natsumi Tabuchi
- Studio: Bibury Animation Studios
- Licensed by: Crunchyroll
- Original network: TBS, BS11
- Original run: December 24, 2024 (Note: The special received a 48-minute special theatrical screening on September 20, 2024.)
- Episodes: 2
- Light novel

The Quintessential Quintuplets: The Four Seasons
- Written by: Hajime Asano
- Illustrated by: Negi Haruba
- Published by: Kodansha
- Imprint: KC Deluxe
- Original run: January 17, 2025 – present
- Volumes: 3
- Anime television series

The Quintessential Quintuplets: The Four Seasons
- Original video animation
- Video games
- The Quintessential Quintuplets: The Quintuplets Can't Divide the Puzzle Into Five Equal Parts (2020); The Quintessential Quintuplets ∬: Summer Memories Also Come in Five (2021); The Quintessential Quintuplets Movie: Five Memories of My Time with You (2022); The Quintessential Quintuplets OMOIDE VR ~ITSUKI~ (2022); The Quintessential Quintuplets OMOIDE VR ~YOTSUBA~ (2025); The Quintessential Princesses: Fantasy, the Abyss, and the Magic Academy (2025)
- icon

The Quintessential Quintuplets (Japanese: 五等分の花嫁, Hepburn: Go-Tōbun no Hanayome; lit. 'Five Equal Brides or The Five-Fifths Bride(s)') is a Japanese manga series written and illustrated by Negi Haruba. It was serialized in Kodansha's Weekly Shōnen Magazine from August 2017 to February 2020, with its chapters collected in 14 tankōbon volumes. The series follows the daily life of a high-school student Futaro Uesugi, who is hired as a private tutor for a group of quintuplets: Ichika, Nino, Miku, Yotsuba, and Itsuki Nakano. At the very beginning of the story, it is shown that the events are being told in a flashback, while an adult Futaro prepares to marry one of the Nakano Quintuplets whose identity is only revealed near the end of the series.

The series is published in English by Kodansha USA under their Kodansha Comics imprint. An anime television series adaptation produced by Tezuka Productions aired from January to March 2019 on TBS and other channels. A second season produced by Bibury Animation Studios aired from January to March 2021. The second season's sequel, The Quintessential Quintuplets Movie, was released as a film in May 2022. An anime television special produced by Shaft premiered in September 2023. A second anime television special produced by Bibury Animation Studios premiered in December 2024. An anime television series adaptation of the sequel light novel series The Quintessential Quintuplets: The Four Seasons and a new original video animation (OVA) have been announced.

The series was a commercial success by December 2022. The manga has had over 20 million copies in circulation. In 2019, the manga won the award for the shōnen category at the 43rd annual Kodansha Manga Awards.

== Synopsis ==
High-school student Futaro Uesugi is an academically gifted student who leads a difficult life—his mother has died, he has no friends, and on top of all that, his father has incurred a large amount of debt.

An opportunity presents itself when the rich Nakano family transfers to his school. Futaro is promptly hired as a highly-paid tutor. However, much to Futaro's dismay, he discovers that his five charges—identical quintuplet sisters of varied personalities—have no interest in studying at all and have abysmal grades. Some of the quintuplets are against having Futaro, whom they view as a stranger, in their apartment, but Futaro's diligent tenacity gradually convinces those girls to accept him and improve their grades.

Throughout the series, Futaro develops special relationships with each of the quintuplets. Although Futaro initially harbors no romantic feelings for any of the sisters at all, it is revealed through a flashback that he eventually marries one of them, but her true identity is only revealed near the end of the series.

== Production ==
The outline for a story about "a group of quintuplets falling in love with the same person" existed even before the serialization of Haruba's previous work, Karma of Purgatory (2014–2015), but was rejected by his editor-in-charge. A year later, as Karma of Purgatory was finishing, Haruba pitched various ideas to the editor, and the "quintuplets" concept was accepted. This was not without some reservations, as it had been viewed negatively in two to three of the serialization committees, so it was decided to have a one-shot manga published first. Said concerns were ultimately unfounded as the one-shot received positive reviews, and so was approved to become a serial.

Haruba finished drawing the last chapter on February 10, 2020.

=== Characters ===
From the beginning, the initial idea was for the protagonists to be quintuplets, and although there were suggestions for the idea of quadruplets and sextuplets raised, it was rejected very quickly. When designing each of the quintuplets, he was inspired by 15 to 20 of his favorite existing female characters, as "some slice-of-life works only with girls". As the characters were quintuplets, Haruba wanted a way to make them memorable to the reader (similar to how colour was used in Super Sentai) with Ichika (yellow), Nino (purple), Miku (blue), Yotsuba (green), and Itsuki (red), and just as the design was almost confirmed he had the idea of adding numbers in their names.

The hair colour of the Nakano quintuplets is different when being coloured, which was suggested by Haruba himself, such that they are more distinguishable from each other. The hair colour of the bride in the flash-forward is, therefore, a colour-in-between.

=== Story ===
The flashforward showing that Futaro will eventually marry only one of the Nakano quintuplets was added in order to eliminate the possibility of Futaro marrying all five of them. It was also decided that all quintuplets would have negative feelings towards Futaro from the beginning, because Haruba wanted to write how their relationships improved from hate to love in the story, except Yotsuba, who acts as Futaro's guide for the development of the story.

While it is often the norm for harem romantic comedy manga to have sexualized depictions of characters, Haruba has said that he tried to avoid this to some extent after Vol. 1. In his opinion, showing panties which are being worn, i.e. panchira, makes characters less mysterious and then less interesting to the readers. To keep the characters interesting, the sexy scenes were intended by him to be ambiguous but not straightforward, leading to readers' imagination. The swimsuit appearance of the Nakanos was finally revealed in Ep. 92 as Haruba thought an episode of swimsuits should exist before finishing the story. In the end, Futaro ultimately chooses and marries Yotsuba Nakano.

== Media ==
=== Manga and light novel ===
The Quintessential Quintuplets is written and illustrated by Negi Haruba. Before the serialization, a one-shot manga of the same name had been published in 2017 issue 8 of Kodansha's Weekly Shōnen Magazine on August 9, 2017, and received positive comments. On December 4, 2019, Haruba announced that the series would end on its 14th tankōbon volume. The series finished on February 19, 2020, with a total of 122 chapters.

The series has been published in English by Kodansha USA under their Kodansha Comics imprint digitally since June 28, 2018, with a line of physical releases beginning publication on January 1, 2019. By August 2020 and July 2021 respectively, all fourteen volumes have been published digitally and physically.

The "all-color" version of the manga series began serialization in Kodansha's online manga platform MagaPoke (Magazine Pocket) on February 26, 2020.

A sequel light novel series titled The Quintessential Quintuplets: The Four Seasons (五等分の花嫁【春夏秋冬】, Go-Tōbun no Hanayome: Shunkashūtō), written by Hajime Asano and illustrated by Haruba, began publication by Kodansha under its KC Deluxe imprint on January 17, 2025, with three volumes released as of September 17, 2025. A manga adaptation of the sequel novel series is also in production.

=== Commercial ===
In October 2017, a television commercial for the manga was released where Ayane Sakura voiced all five girls.

=== Anime ===
An anime television series adaptation was announced in the combined 36th and 37th issue of Weekly Shōnen Magazine on August 8, 2018. The series is directed by Satoshi Kuwabara and written by Keiichirō Ōchi, featuring animation by Tezuka Productions, character designs by Michinosuke Nakamura, and music by Natsumi Tabuchi, Hanae Nakamura, and Miki Sakurai. The series aired from January 10 to March 28, 2019, on the TBS, SUN, and BS-TBS channels. The series ran for 12 episodes. Crunchyroll streamed the series and Funimation provided the English dub as it airs. Although Tezuka Productions was the main animation studio behind the series, TBS producer Junichirou Tanaka stated that he asked for help from Shaft president Mitsutoshi Kubota for assistance in producing the series' 11th episode. That story may be exaggerated to some degree, as in another interview Tanaka said that Tezuka Productions had not received enough time to produce the series, so he tried phoning a number of production companies and eventually landed on Shaft (who animated Hidamari Sketch, another TBS-produced anime) and Kubota accepted the offer to contribute key animation only for the A-part (first half) of the episode. Later, Tanaka asked Kubota if Shaft could produce the entire episode, and since the two companies had history, and Kubota was on friendly terms with producer Hiroshi Oosawa form Tezuka Productions, Shaft eventually agreed to produce the entire episode save for the storyboards, which were drawn by series director Satoshi Kuwabara; however, all other animation, coloring, and compositing aspects of the episode were produced entirely at Shaft.

A second season was announced in a special event for the first season on May 5, 2019. Kaori replaced Satoshi Kuwabara as the director of the season, and Keiichirō Ōchi returned to write the scripts. Bibury Animation Studios produced this season. It was originally scheduled to premiere in October 2020, but due to issues caused by the COVID-19 pandemic, the anime aired from January 8 to March 26, 2021.

After the second season aired, a sequel was announced. On April 18, 2021, the sequel was revealed to be the anime film The Quintessential Quintuplets Movie. Masato Jinbo directed the film, with the main staff of the second season returning to reprise their roles. The film continues the story with Futaro confessing love with the girls during the school festival. It premiered in Japan on May 20, 2022.

On April 1, 2023, during "The Quintessential Quintuplets Special Event 2023", a new anime project, titled The Quintessential Quintuplets ∽, was announced. The anime adapts stories that were previously not adapted, and is set after the second season of the series and before the events of the anime film The Quintessential Quintuplets Movie. The project is a two-episode television special that aired on TBS and BS11 between September 2 and 9, 2023, following a three-week theatrical screening on July 14, 2023. It follows Futaro suspending his tutoring job and accompanying the girls on summer vacation. The special is directed by Yukihiro Miyamoto and animated by Shaft, with Keiichirō Ōchi returning to write the scripts.

On April 28, 2024, during "The Quintessential Quintuplets 5th Anniversary Event" in Yokohama Arena, another new anime project, titled The Quintessential Quintuplets*, was announced. The anime is an original project with the story being drafted by Haruba, and recounts Futaro and the quintuplets' honeymoon trip. The project is a second television special that premiered on TBS on December 24, 2024, following a three-week theatrical screening on September 20, 2024. The special is directed by Masato Jinbo and animated by Bibury Animation Studios.

On May 2, 2026, during "The Quintessential Quintuplets Special Event 2026" in Toyota Arena Tokyo, an anime television series adaptation of the sequel light novel series and a new original video animation (OVA) adapting other manga stories that were previously not adapted were announced.

For the first season, Kana Hanazawa, Ayana Taketatsu, Miku Itō, Ayane Sakura, and Inori Minase performed the opening theme song "Quintuplet Feelings" (五等分の気持ち, Gotōbun no Kimochi) as the group The Nakano Family's Quintuplets (中野家の五つ子, Nakano-ke no Itsutsugo), while Aya Uchida performed the ending theme song "Sign".

For the second season, the Nakano Family's Quintuplets performed the opening theme song "Gotōbun no Katachi" and the ending theme song "Hatsukoi".

For the side-story special, The Nakano Family's Quintuplets performed the opening theme song "Gotōbun no Mirai" and the ending theme song "Takaramono".

For the honeymoon special, The Nakano Family's Quintuplets performed the opening theme song "Gotōbun no Egao" and the ending theme song "Memories".

=== Video games ===
Characters from the series appeared in a collaboration event in the mobile video game Venus 11 Vivid!! from May 25 to 31, 2019.

A mobile game based on the series titled The Quintessential Quintuplets: The Quintuplets Can't Divide the Puzzle into Five Equal Parts (Japanese: 五等分の花嫁 五つ子ちゃんはパズルを五等分できない。, Hepburn: Gotoubun no Hanayome: Itsutsu-ko-chan wa Puzzle o Gotoubun Dekinai.) was released in 2020. The game received a console port for the PlayStation 4 and Nintendo Switch developed by Mages under the title The Quintessential Quintuplets: Gotopazu Story (五等分の花嫁 ごとぱずストーリー, Gotoubun no Hanayome Gotopazu Story). It was released on June 29, 2023, in Japan. A follow-up game, titled The Quintessential Quintuplets: Gotopazu Story 2nd, was released in Japan on September 26, 2024.

A visual novel titled The Quintessential Quintuplets ∬: Summer Memories Also Come in Five (Japanese: 五等分の花嫁∬～夏の思い出も五等分～, Hepburn: Gotoubun no Hanayome ∬: Natsu no Omoide mo Gotoubun) was developed by Mages for the PlayStation 4 and Nintendo Switch consoles. It features an original story in a deserted island setting, and was released on March 25, 2021, in Japan. It was released worldwide under the title The Quintessential Quintuplets: Memories of a Quintessential Summer on May 23, 2024 on Steam.

A visual novel based on the film, titled The Quintessential Quintuplets Movie: Five Memories of My Time with You (映画 五等分の花嫁 ～君と過ごした五つの思い出～, Eiga Gotoubun no Hanayome Kimi to Sugoshita Itsutsu no Omoide) was developed by Mages for the Nintendo Switch and PlayStation 4, and was released on June 2, 2022, in Japan. It was released worldwide under the title The Quintessential Quintuplets: Five Memories Spent With You on May 23, 2024 on PC Steam.

A virtual reality game titled The Quintessential Quintuplets OMOIDE VR ~Itsuki~ (五等分の花嫁 思い出VR 五月編, Gotoubun no Hanayome Omoide VR Itsuki-hen), also known as The Quintessential Quintuplets Memories VR: Itsuki Edition was developed by NextNinja and Blackc for Steam and Meta Quest. It was released in Japanese and English for Steam on October 12, 2022, and for Meta Quest on December 7, 2022. A second virtual reality game titled The Quintessential Quintuplets OMOIDE VR ~Yotsuba~ (五等分の花嫁 思い出VR ～四葉編～, Gotoubun no Hanayome Omoide VR Yotsuba-hen) was released in Japanese and English for Steam on February 24, 2025.

=== Exhibitions ===
Multiple exhibitions were held across Japan starting from 2019, including Tokyo, Osaka, Niigata and Nagoya. An overseas exhibition was held in Taipei, Taiwan in July 2020.

== Reception ==
=== Sales ===
The Quintessential Quintuplets had 2 million copies in circulation by January 2019; it reached 3 million copies in circulation by February 2019; it had over 15 million copies in circulation by April 2021; over 16 million copies in circulation by March 2022; and over 20 million copies in circulation by December 2022.

In Japan, the manga series was the fifth-best selling manga in 2019, and the third-best selling manga in the first half of 2020, behind Demon Slayer: Kimetsu no Yaiba and One Piece.

=== Critical response ===
The Quintessential Quintuplets received positive reviews, most notably for its romantic comedy and harem elements. Paul Jensen of Anime News Network found the series enjoyable and rated a 4 out of 5 to the series, as he commented, "The jokes are funny, the characters range from tolerable to likable, the fanservice doesn't go overboard, and there's no creepy or obnoxious plot point to spoil the party. There's nothing revolutionary about it, but it does a lot of basic things well without showing any major flaws, and that's enough to make this premiere good clean (well, clean-ish) fun." Patrick Frye of Monsters And Critics noted that there was "little to no ecchi shenanigans or degrading fan service and the girls move beyond the initial stereotypes and become fleshed-out characters that create a fun dynamic with the main character, Futaro Uesugi. Audiences are tired of watching a lucky everyman stumble his way through unlikely scenarios. Instead, Futaro's no-nonsense attitude wins the day." Kyle Rogacion of Goomba Stomp praised the plot of the anime but criticized its art style and fanservice gags. The series has a current score of 4.8 out of 5 stars on Crunchyroll as of April 2025.

=== Awards and nominations ===
The series was nominated for the Next Manga Award 2018, organized by Niconico. It received 16,106 votes, eventually ranking eighth overall. In May 2019, it won the award for Best Shōnen Manga at the 43rd annual Kodansha Manga Awards, alongside To Your Eternity. On the award ceremony of the 43rd annual Kodansha Manga Awards, as one of the judges, Ken Akamatsu praised The Quintessential Quintuplets as "The ultimate complete version of harem bishōjo romantic comedy" with "very high quality of illustration".

Year	Award	Category	Recipient(s)	Result
2018	Next Manga Award	Manga	The Quintessential Quintuplets	8th place
2019	Kodansha Manga Award	Shōnen Manga	The Quintessential Quintuplets	Won
