= Indra (disambiguation) =

Indra is the chief deity/Deva of the Rigveda and the king of Devas later Hindu beliefs.

Indra may also refer to:

== People ==
- Indra (given name), a given name found in various cultures
- Indra (surname)
- Indra III (914 – 929), king of the Indian Rashtrakuta dynasty
- Indra IV (973 – 982), king of the Indian Rashtrakuta dynasty
- Indra (painter), Indian Chan Buddhist painter in China
- Indra, Crown Princess of Nepal (1926–1950)
- Indra (singer) (born 1967), Swedish singer and actress

== Places ==
- Indra, Estonia, a village in Vastseliina Parish, Võru County, Estonia
- Indra, Gujarat, a village in Junagadh district, Gujarat state, India
- Indra parish, an administrative unit of Krāslava municipality, Latvia

== Technology ==
- Indra Sistemas, a Spanish information technologies and defense systems company
- Indian Doppler Radar, in use with the Indian armed forces
- Intermeccanica Indra, a sports car developed in 1971 by Intermeccanica, Bitter Cars, and Opel

== Film ==
- Indra (2002 film), Indian Telugu film
- Indra (2008 film), Indian Kannada film

== Music ==
- Indra, a 1903 symphonic poem by Gustav Holst
- "Indra", a song by Thievery Corporation from The Mirror Conspiracy
- "Indra", a song by Susumu Hirasawa from the Sword of the Berserk: Guts' Rage soundtrack

== Other uses ==
- Indra (character), a Marvel Comics character
- INDRA (naval exercise), a bi-annual military exercise conducted by India and Russia
- Indra, a club owned by Bruno Koschmider, in Hamburg, Germany, where the Beatles played in 1960
- Indra Chaudhari, the protagonist of Axiom Verge 2

== See also ==
- Indira (disambiguation)
- Inder (disambiguation)
- Indraja (disambiguation)
- Intharacha (disambiguation)
- Indrani, the consort of Indra
