= Indre (disambiguation) =

Indre is a department in the Centre region of France.

Indre may also refer to:

- Indre, Loire-Atlantique, a commune in the Loire-Atlantique region of France
- Indre (river), in central France
- Indrė, a Lithuanian feminine given name

== See also ==
- Indra (disambiguation)
