= Veil of Isis =

Metaphor for the inaccessibility of nature's secrets

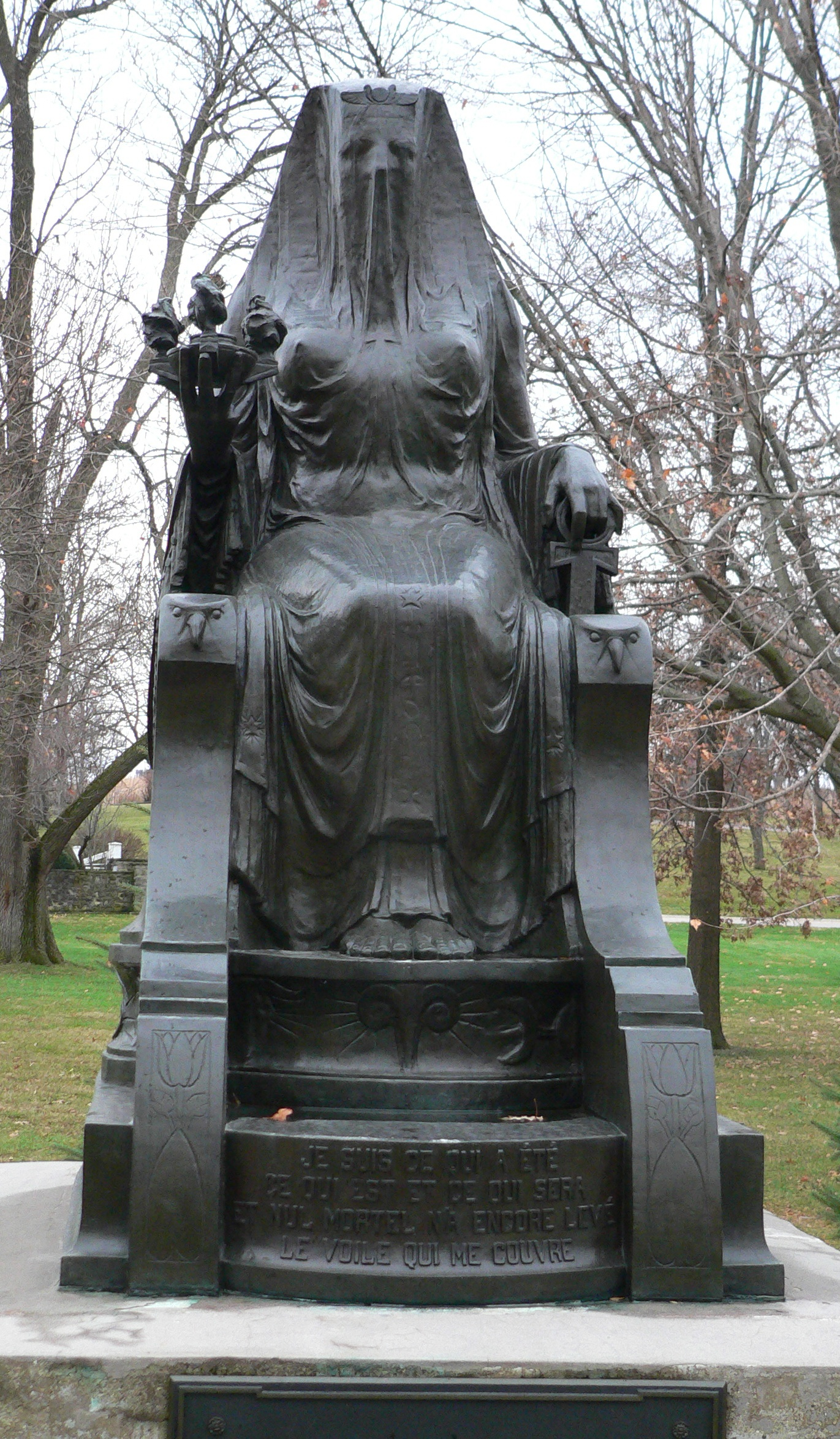
Isis as a veiled "goddess of life" with a French translation of the Sais inscription on the pedestal, located at the Herbert Hoover National Historic Site

The veil of Isis is a metaphor and allegorical artistic motif representing the inaccessibility of nature's secrets, personified as the goddess Isis shrouded by a veil or mantle.

The motif traces back to a statue in the ancient Egyptian city of Sais. As recounted by Greco-Roman authors, the statue of the veiled goddess bore the inscription: "I am all that has been and is and shall be; and no mortal has ever lifted my mantle."

Illustrations of Isis with her veil being lifted were popular beginning in the late 17th century, often as allegorical representations of Enlightenment progress uncovering nature's mysteries. By the end of the 18th century, the unveiling of Isis was invoked as a metaphor for the revelation of awe-inspiring truths beyond scientific discovery. The 1877 book Isis Unveiled influenced Western esotericism and Neopagan movements, promulgating the metaphor to modern magical and spiritual practices.

The veil of Isis was often combined with a related motif, portraying nature as a goddess with multiple breasts, who represents Isis, Artemis, or a combination of both.

== Origin at Sais ==
The first mention of the veil of Isis appears in On Isis and Osiris, a philosophical interpretation of ancient Egyptian religion by Plutarch, a Greek writer in the late first and early second centuries CE. He described a seated statue of a goddess in the Egyptian city of Sais that bore the inscription "I am all that has been and is and shall be; and no mortal has ever lifted my garment." Plutarch called the garment a peplos, a term translated as "mantle" or "veil" in English. Plutarch identified the goddess as "Athena, whom [the Egyptians] consider to be Isis."

Sais was the cult center of the goddess Neith, whom the Greeks compared to their goddess Athena. In Plutarch's time Isis was the preeminent goddess among ancient Egyptian deities, and was frequently syncretized with Neith, and he equates the two.

Three centuries years after Plutarch, the Neoplatonist philosopher Proclus wrote of the same statue in Book I of his Commentaries on Plato's "Timaeus". In this version, the garment is a chiton, "no mortal" is replaced by "no one", and a third statement is added: "The fruit of my womb was the sun".

Proclus said the statue was in the adyton of a temple at Sais, but the inner areas of Egyptian temples were not accessible to anyone but priests, and it is unlikely that a statue of a deity would have been permanently veiled; priests saw the cult image of the god every day when performing temple rites. However, a statue in a temple's courtyards or halls could have borne an inscription similar to the one Plutarch and Proclus related. The first part of the inscription—"I am all that has been and is and shall be"—means the goddess encompasses everything. This claim was commonly made of creator gods such as Ra or Amun in Egyptian religion; if the same was said about Isis, it reflected her increased status in Greco-Roman times, in which she was often said to be the creator of the world. The second part—"no one has ever lifted my mantle"—implies that the goddess was virginal, a claim that was occasionally made of Isis in Greco-Roman times but conflicted with the long-standing belief that she and her husband Osiris conceived their son Horus. Proclus's version suggests that the goddess conceived and gave birth to the sun without the participation of a male deity, which would reflect Egyptian myths about Neith as the mother of the sun god Ra. Another possible explanation, suggested by the Egyptologist Jan Assmann, is that the latter part of the Egyptian inscription said "There is nobody except me", proclaiming that the all-encompassing goddess was unique, and was mistranslated into Greek as "there is nobody who opened [or: uncovered] my face."

== Personification of nature ==
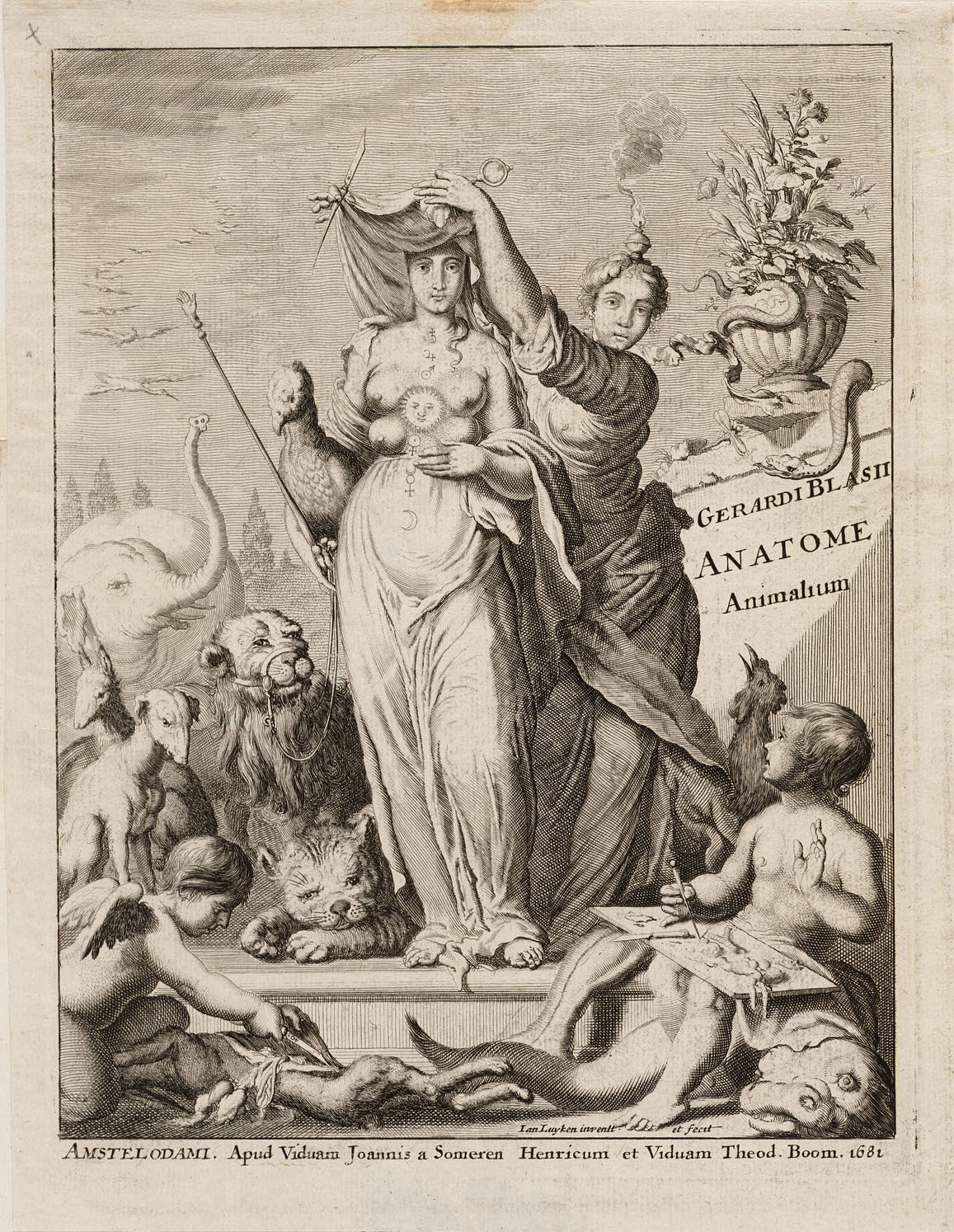
Science unveiling Nature in the frontispiece to Anatome Animalum, 1681

Several other sources influenced the motif of the veiled Isis. One was a tradition that linked Isis with nature and the goddess Artemis. European art has a long tradition of personifying nature as a motherly figure. Starting in the 16th century, this motif was influenced by the iconography of the goddess Artemis of Ephesus (also known under the name of her Roman equivalent, Diana). The Ephesian Artemis was depicted with round protuberances on her chest that may originally have been jewelry but came to be interpreted as breasts. Isis was sometimes compared with Artemis, and the Roman writer Macrobius, in the fourth century CE, wrote, "Isis is the earth or nature that is under the sun. That is why the goddess's entire body bristles with a multitude of breasts placed close to one another [as in the case of Artemis of Ephesus], because all things are nourished by earth or by nature." Thus, the 16th-century artists represented nature as Isis-Artemis with multiple breasts.

A second influence was a tradition that nature is mysterious. It goes back to an aphorism by the Greek philosopher Heraclitus in the late sixth or early fifth century BCE, which is traditionally translated as "Nature loves to hide." Edmund Spenser's The Faerie Queene in the 1590s personified nature as a woman with a veil, though without a direct connection to Isis, although Isis appears elsewhere in the work. Several illustrators in the 17th century used the anonymous woman with a veil in the same way. In the 1650s, Athanasius Kircher's Oedipus Aegyptiacus explicitly explained Isis's veil as an emblem of the secrets of nature.

The frontispiece to Gerhard Blasius's 1681 book Anatome Animalum, engraved by Jan Luyken, was the first depiction of a many-breasted Isis-Artemis figure with her veil being removed. It shows a personification of science removing the veil, as an allegory for the way science uncovers nature's secrets. This metaphor was reused in the frontispieces of many of Antonie van Leeuwenhoek's works, and then in illustrations to other scientific works throughout the 18th century. In some cases the veiled figure is a statue, reminiscent of the original statue of Artemis at Ephesus, while in others it is a living woman. The motif was sometimes elaborated with other metaphors, so that, for example, in the frontispiece to The Philosophy of Nature by Jean-Baptiste-Claude Delisle de Sales, Nature unveils herself to a philosopher as he overthrows Despotism and Superstition. The unveiling of the Isis-figure thus expressed the hope, prevalent during the Age of Enlightenment, that philosophy and science would triumph over unreason to uncover nature's deepest truths. This motif continued beyond the Enlightenment into the 19th century. An example is Louis-Ernest Barrias's 1899 sculpture Nature Unveiling Herself Before Science, in which the multiple breasts are omitted and the figure of Nature wears a scarab on her gown that hints at her Egyptian connections.

== Personification of mystery ==
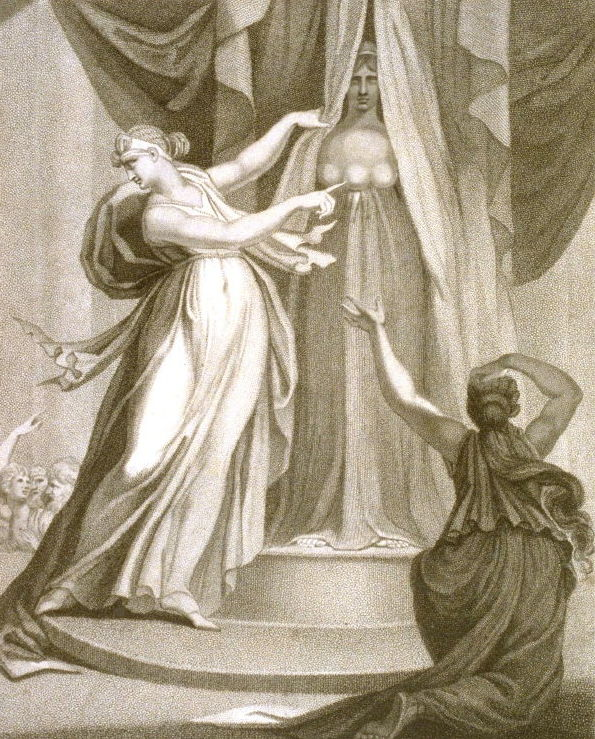
The unveiling of a statue of Isis as a personification of nature, depicted as the climactic moment of an Isiac initiation, in an 1803 engraving by Henry Fuseli

Another interpretation of Isis's veil emerged in the late 18th century, in keeping with the Romantic movement that was developing at the time, in which nature constitutes an awe-inspiring mystery rather than prosaic knowledge.

This interpretation was influenced by the ancient mystery initiations dedicated to Isis that were performed in the Greco-Roman world. Although these rites were developed in Hellenistic or Roman times, under the influence of earlier Greco-Roman mystery rites, both classical authors and 18th-century scholars assumed them to have been age-old features of ancient Egyptian religion. Many Freemasons, members of a European fraternal organization that attained its modern form in the early 18th century, adopted Egyptian motifs and came to believe their rituals could be traced back to the mysteries of Isis. One Freemason in the 1780s, Karl Leonhard Reinhold, tried to reconcile Freemasonry's traditional origin story, which traces Freemasonry back to ancient Israel, with its enthusiasm for Egyptian themes. To do so, he interpreted the first statement on the statue at Sais, "I am all that has been and is and shall be," as a declaration of pantheism, in which nature and divinity are identical. Reinhold claimed the public face of Egyptian religion was polytheistic, but the Egyptian mysteries were designed to reveal the deeper, pantheistic truth to elite initiates. He also said the statement "I am that I am", spoken by the Jewish God in the Book of Exodus, meant the same as the Saite inscription and indicated that Judaism was a descendant of the ancient Egyptian belief system. Under the influence of Reinhold's interpretation, other Freemasons came to see the veiled Isis as a symbol of an impenetrable enigma, representing truth and being as well as nature, a deity that, as Assmann puts it, was regarded as "too all-encompassing to have a name."

Immanuel Kant connected the motif of Isis's veil with his concept of the sublime, saying, "Perhaps no one has said anything more sublime, or expressed a thought more sublimely, than in that inscription on the temple of Isis (Mother Nature)." According to Kant, the sublime evoked both wonder and terror, and these emotions appeared frequently in the works of late 18th and early 19th-century authors using the motif of the veil. The ecstatic nature of ancient mystery rites themselves contributed to the focus on emotions. Friedrich Schiller, for instance, wrote an essay on Egyptian and Jewish religion that mostly copied Reinhold's work but put a new emphasis on the emotional buildup that surrounded the mysteries. He said it prepared the initiate to confront the awe-inspiring power of nature at the climax of the rite. Similarly, a frontispiece by Henry Fuseli, made for Erasmus Darwin's poem The Temple of Nature in 1803, explicitly shows the unveiling of a statue of Isis as the climax of the initiation.

Helena Blavatsky's 1877 book Isis Unveiled, one of the foundational texts for the esoteric belief system of Theosophy, used the metaphor of the veil as its title. Isis is not prominent in the book, but in it Blavatsky said that philosophers try to lift the veil of Isis, or nature, but see only her physical forms. She added, "The soul within escapes their view; and the Divine Mother has no answer for them," implying that Theosophy would reveal truths about nature that science and philosophy could not.

== Parting the veil ==
The "Parting of the Veil", "Piercing of the Veil", "Rending of the Veil" or "Lifting of the Veil" refers, in the Western mystery tradition and Neopagan witchcraft, to opening the "veil" of matter, thus gaining entry to a state of spiritual awareness in which the mysteries of nature are revealed. In ceremonial magic, the Sign of the Rending of the Veil is a symbolic gesture performed by the magician with the intention of creating such an opening. It is performed starting with the arms extended forwards and hands flat against each other (either palm to palm or back to back), then spreading the hands apart with a rending motion until the arms point out to both sides and the body is in a T shape. After the working is complete, the magician will typically perform the corresponding Sign of the Closing of the Veil, which has the same movements in reverse.

== See also ==
- Maya (religion)

== Works cited ==
- Assmann, Jan (1997). Moses the Egyptian: The Memory of Egypt in Western Monotheism. Harvard University Press. ISBN 978-0-674-58738-0.
- Bremmer, Jan N. (2014). Initiation into the Mysteries of the Ancient World. Walter de Gruyter. ISBN 978-3-11-029955-7.
- Greer, John Michael (1997). Circles of Power: Ritual Magic in the Western Tradition. Llewelyn Worldwide. ISBN 978-1-56718-313-9.
- Griffiths, J. Gwyn, ed. (1970). Plutarch's De Iside et Osiride. University of Wales Press.
- Hadot, Pierre (2006) [2004]. The Veil of Isis: An Essay on the History of the Idea of Nature. Translated by Michael Chase. The Belknap Press of Harvard University Press. ISBN 978-0-674-02316-1.
- Macpherson, Jay (2004). "The Travels of Sethos". Lumen: Selected Proceedings from the Canadian Society for 18th-Century Studies. 23.
- Quentin, Florence (2012). Isis l'Éternelle: Biographie d'une mythe féminin (in French). Albin Michel. ISBN 978-2-226-24022-4.
- Ziolkowski, Theodore (Summer 2008). "The Veil as Metaphor and Myth". Religion & Literature. 40 (2).
