= Mayabheda =

Sanskrit word meaning the breaching or removal of Avidya (ignorance)

Mayabheda, (Sanskrit:मायाभेद:), means the breaching or removal of Avidya ("ignorance"). It means the destruction of the illusion caused by Maya which occurs coinciding with the gain/dawn of Right Knowledge, the knowledge of Brahman. The Rig Veda Sukta R.V.X.177 addressed to Mayabheda in its three Mantras in its own cryptic way serves this purpose. The central theme of this hymn is the discernment of Maya or illusion, the cause of material creation. Mayabheda is also one of the Rigvedic deities.

== About Sukta R.V.X.177 ==
The Rig Veda is an ancient anthology of Sanskrit poems mostly in the form of prayers to the Vedic gods. It consists of Ten Books or Mandalas. The Tenth Mandala contains 191 Suktas addressed to Agni, Indra and many other deities. The Purusha sukta (R.V.90), the Hiranyagarbha sukta (R.V.X.121) and the Nasadiya Sukta (R.V.X.129) are a part of this Mandala in which there are many more important hymns.

The Tenth Mandala of the Rig Veda also contains Sukta R.V.X.177 of Rishi Patanga Prajapati which is addressed to the Vedic deity, Mayabheda. It is a very short Sukta consisting of just three mantras. The first mantra is in Jagati chhanda to be sung or recited in Nishad Swara, the second mantra is in Virat-trishtup chhanda to be sung in Dhaivata Swara and the third, in Nichrit-trishtup chhanda also to be sung in Dhaivata Swara. The third mantra also appears in the First Mandala in the "Riddle Hymn" as Sukta R.V.I.164.31 in the hymn addressed to the Vishwadevas, in which regard it is said that in this mantra is to be found the culminating point of the whole doctrine of the Transmigration of souls.

== Sukta - text ==
(Translated into English a) by Ralph T. H. Griffith and b) by Laurie L. Patton and c) freely as per Swami Dayananda Saraswati’s interpretation.)

प॒तं॒गम॒क्तमसु॑रस्य मा॒यया॑ हृ॒दा प॑श्यन्ति॒ मन॑सा विप॒श्चित॑: ।
स॒मु॒द्रे अ॒न्तः क॒वयो॒ वि च॑क्षते॒ मरी॑चीनां प॒दमि॑च्छन्ति वे॒धस॑: ॥१॥

a) The sapient with their spirit and their mind behold the Bird adorned with all an Asura’s magic might. Sages observe him in the ocean’s inmost depth: the wise disposers seek the station of his rays.
b) The wise behold with their mind in their heart the Sun, made manifest by the illusion of the Asura. The sages look into the solar orb, the ordainers desire the region of his rays.
c) The one who has entered the Prana, who is the Prana of the Pranas, owing to His grace the wise ones whole-heartedly (devotedly) observe with great interest the constant (observable) activity in the life (empirical existence) of the Jiva (the individual self); but those who are blessed with sharper and deeper insight are able to see stationed within (merged with) the Lord (the supreme Self) all those Jivas that have attained moksha (liberation); therefore, the wise adore the Lord who rests shining ever so brightly.

प॒तं॒गो वाचं॒ मन॑सा बिभर्ति॒ तां ग॑न्ध॒र्वो॑ऽवद॒द्गर्भे॑ अ॒न्तः।
तां द्योत॑मानां स्व॒र्यं॑ मनी॒षामृ॒तस्य॑ प॒दे क॒वयो॒ नि पा॑न्ति॥२॥

a) The flying Bird bears Speech within his spirit: erst the Gandharva in the womb pronounced it. And at the seat of sacrifice the sages cherish their radiant, heavenly-bright invention.
b) The Sun bears the word in his mind; the Gandharva has spoken it within the wombs; sages cherish it in the place of sacrifice, brilliant, heavenly, ruling the mind.
c) The Jiva sincerely employs its ability to speak ("speech"); the speech which emerges from within in the form of (various/numerous) words is impelled by the Prana residing within the body having been inspired by it; the all-spreading brilliant light-rays and the vibrant air (collectively) together gathering that word-form speech lifts that speech carrying it to all corners of space (for it to be heard).

अप॑श्यं गो॒पामनि॑पद्यमान॒मा च॒ परा॑ च प॒थिभि॒श्चर॑न्तम्।
स स॒ध्रीची॒: स विषू॑ची॒र्वसा॑न॒ आ व॑रीवर्ति॒ भुव॑नेष्व॒न्तः॥३॥

a) I saw the Herdsman, him who never resteth, approaching and departing on his pathways. He, clothed in gathered and diffusive splendour, within the worlds continuously travels.
b) I beheld the protector, never descending, going by his paths to the east and the west; clothing the quarters of the heaven and the intermediate spaces. He constantly revolves in the midst of the worlds.
c) The lord of the senses, the all-knowing one, as the witness, watches the imperishable Jiva who in accordance with its past and present works is repeatedly born in this world and passes through many types of agreeable and disagreeable births.

== Import ==
According to the Asvalayana Srauta Sutra IV.6, Mantra ||2|| of this Rigvedic hymn is the inviting verse of the immolated to Vac (speech), and is used in the pravargya rites along with Mantra ||3||. Mantra ||1|| does refer directly to the Sun. In the Vidhana literature the richness and ambivalence contained within the rite is lost when vide IV.115 it is said that one should constantly mutter that which is destructive of ignorance (ajnanabheda), and which begins with patangam (the mantras of R.V.X.177) which hymn is indeed destructive of illusion (mayabheda) and repels all sorts of illusion; and vide IV.116 it is suggested that one should, by means of this hymn, prevent illusion, be that of Sambara or Indrajala; one should, by means of this, ward off the illusion caused by unseen beings. Here the enemy is one that can create maya, and interfere with the abilities to discern what is true and what is not.

According to Wash Edward Hale the first mantra could refer to the myth of the Svarbhanu hiding the Sun with darkness until it was found by the Atris; if so, this is the only occurrence of asura, in the singular, referring to a mythological evil or demonic being.
