= Indraja (disambiguation) =

Indraja is an Indian actress.

Indraja may also refer to:

- Indraja, a daughter of Indra in Indian astrology
- Indraja, festival to Indra observed by Pawra subtribe among Bhils in India
- Indraja (इनद्राजा), ayurvedic medicine, seeds of Holarrhena pubescens
- Indraja, the god Jupiter in list of Lithuanian gods and mythological figures
- Indraja, a daughter of Perun, a Marvel Comics character

== See also ==
- Indra (disambiguation)
- Intharacha (disambiguation)
- Indrajala, Indian term for illusion
- Indrajal Comics, Indian comics publisher
- Indrajaalam, a 1990 Indian film
