= Inder =

Inder may refer to:

People

- Brigid Inder, New Zealand justice advocate
- Inder Bawra, an Indian music director
- Inder Kumar, Indian actor
- Inder Kumar Gujral, Prime Minister of India from 1997 to 1998

Places

- Inder, the administrative center of Jalaid Banner, Mongolia
- Inder, a locality in the Nagpur district in state of Maharashtra, India
- Inder District, a district of Atyrau Region in Kazakhstan
- Inder (lake), a lake in Kazakhstan
- Inder (Bagan basin), a lake in Russia
- Inder (village), a settlement in Novosibirsk Oblast, Russia

Other

- Inder (company), a former Spanish manufacturer of pinball machines
- Instituto Nacional de Deportes, Educación Fisica y Recreación, or INDER, the sports ministry in Cuba

== See also ==
- Indra (disambiguation)
