= Nature Unveiling Herself Before Science =

French allegorical sculpture

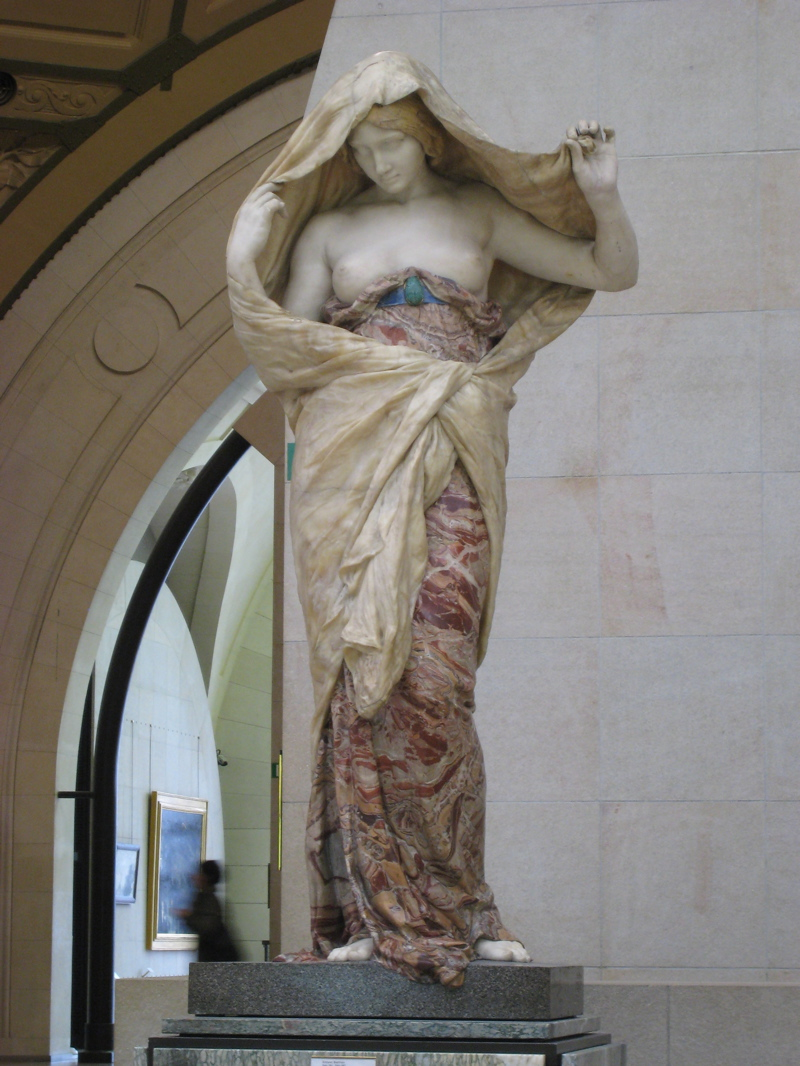
The original La Nature se dévoilant à la Science in the Musée d'Orsay

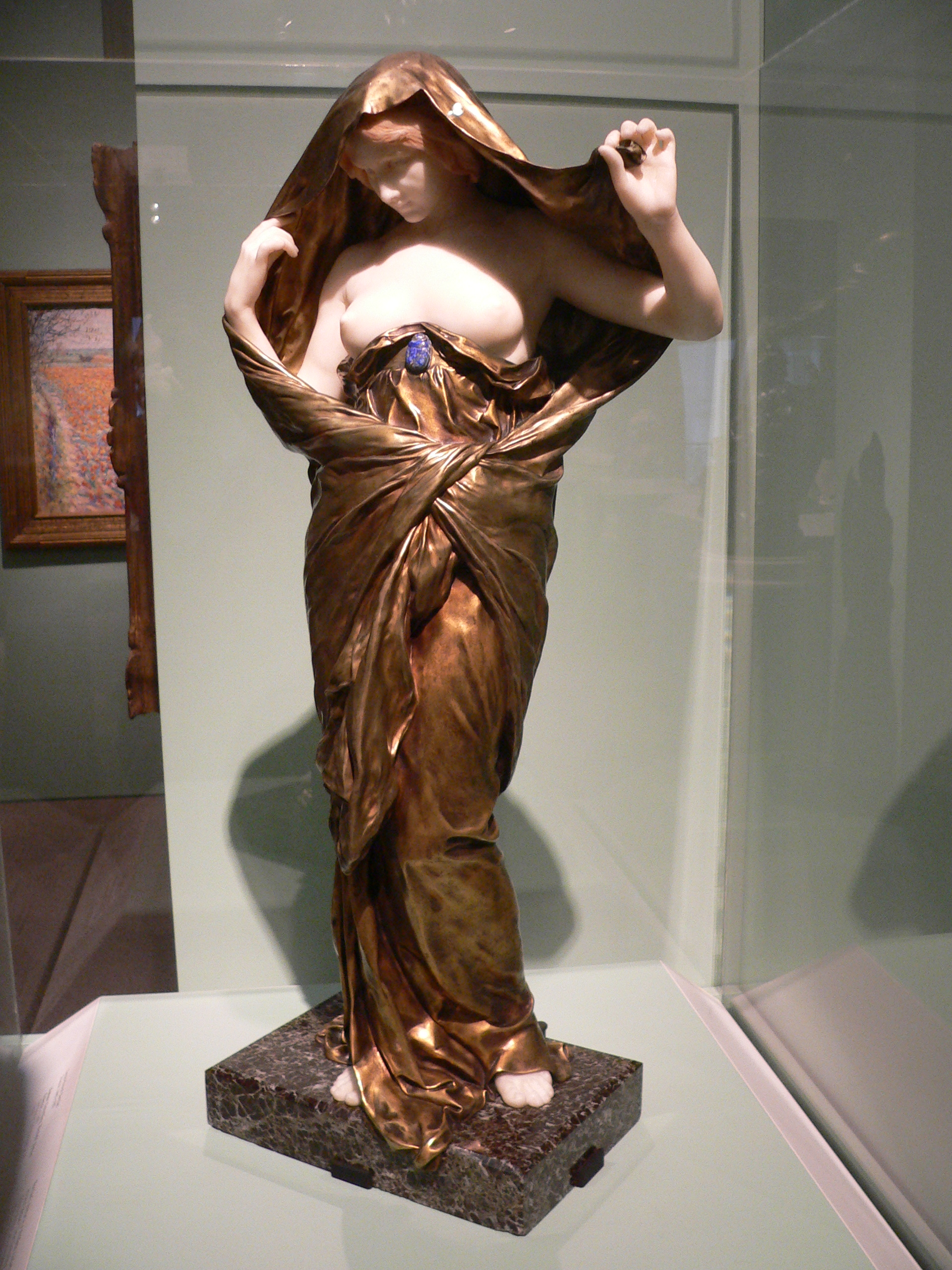
A copy of Nature Unveiling Herself Before Science in gilt bronze, polychromed marble, and lapis lazuli, from the Iris & B. Gerald Cantor Center for Visual Arts

Nature Unveiling Herself Before Science (La Nature se dévoilant à la Science) is an allegorical sculpture created in 1899 in the Art Nouveau style by Louis-Ernest Barrias. The sculpture depicts a woman—personifying Nature—removing a veil to reveal her face and bare breasts. The sculpture, which is in the Musée d'Orsay, was commissioned for the Conservatoire National des Arts et Métiers. Underneath the veil, Nature wears a gown held up by a scarab. The figure is made of marble, with the gown made of Algerian onyx, and the scarab of malachite. The sculpture has also been reproduced in other media.

According to historians of science Lorraine Daston and Peter Galison, the sculpture "blends the ancient trope of the veil of Isis, interpreted as nature's desire to hide her secrets, with the modern fantasy of (female) nature willingly revealing herself to the (male) scientist, without violence or artifice." According to historian of science Carolyn Merchant, the sculpture is emblematic of transformation of conceptions of nature that came with the Scientific Revolution: "From an active teacher and parent, she [Nature] has become a mindless, submissive body." In a similar vein, biologist and essayist Gerald Weissmann has noted the similarity between Nature's pose in Barrias' sculpture and that of the central figure in the 1876 painting Dr. Pinel Unchaining the Mad by Tony Robert-Fleury, a released inmate from an insane asylum who has "the detached look of the very lost." Literary critic Elaine Showalter imagines a companion piece depicting Science would consist of "a fully clothed man, whose gaze [is] bold, direct, and keen, the penetrating gaze of intellectual and sexual mastery".
