= Intharacha =

Intharacha or In Racha (Thai: อินทราชา, IPA: [ʔin.tʰá.raː.t͡ɕʰaː / ʔin raː.t͡ɕʰaː]); Pali: Indarājā; "King Indra"), extended as Intharachathirat or In Rachathirat (Thai: อินทราชาธิราช, IPA: [ʔin.tʰá.raː.t͡ɕʰaː.tʰí.râːt / ʔin raː.t͡ɕʰaː.tʰí.râːt]; Pali: Indarājādhirāja; "King Indra of High Kings"), variably known as Nakhon In (Thai: นครอินทร์, IPA: [ná.kʰɔːn˧ ʔin]; Sanskrit: Nagara Indra; "Indra of City") and Nakharin (Thai: นครินทร์, IPA: [ná.kʰá.rin]; Sanskrit: Nagarindra; "Indra of City"), was a Thai royal title historically given to rulers of Suphan Buri. It may refer to:

- Intharachathirat (Nakhon In), the sixth king of Ayutthaya, an ancient kingdom in Thailand
- Intharacha (son of Borommarachathirat II), a son of King Borommarachathirat II of Ayutthaya, later became a ruler of Angkor Thom
- Intharacha (son of Borommatrailokkanat), a son of King Borommatrailokkanat of Ayutthaya
- Intharacha (son of Ekathotsarot), a son of King Ekathotsarot of Ayutthaya
- Intharacha (son of Prasat Thong), a son of King Prasat Thong of Ayutthaya
- Srinagarindra, the first woman to assume such a title

== See also ==
- Indra (disambiguation)
- Indraja (disambiguation)
- Rajadhi Raja (disambiguation)
