= Indra, Gujarat =

Village in Gujarat, India

Indra
- village
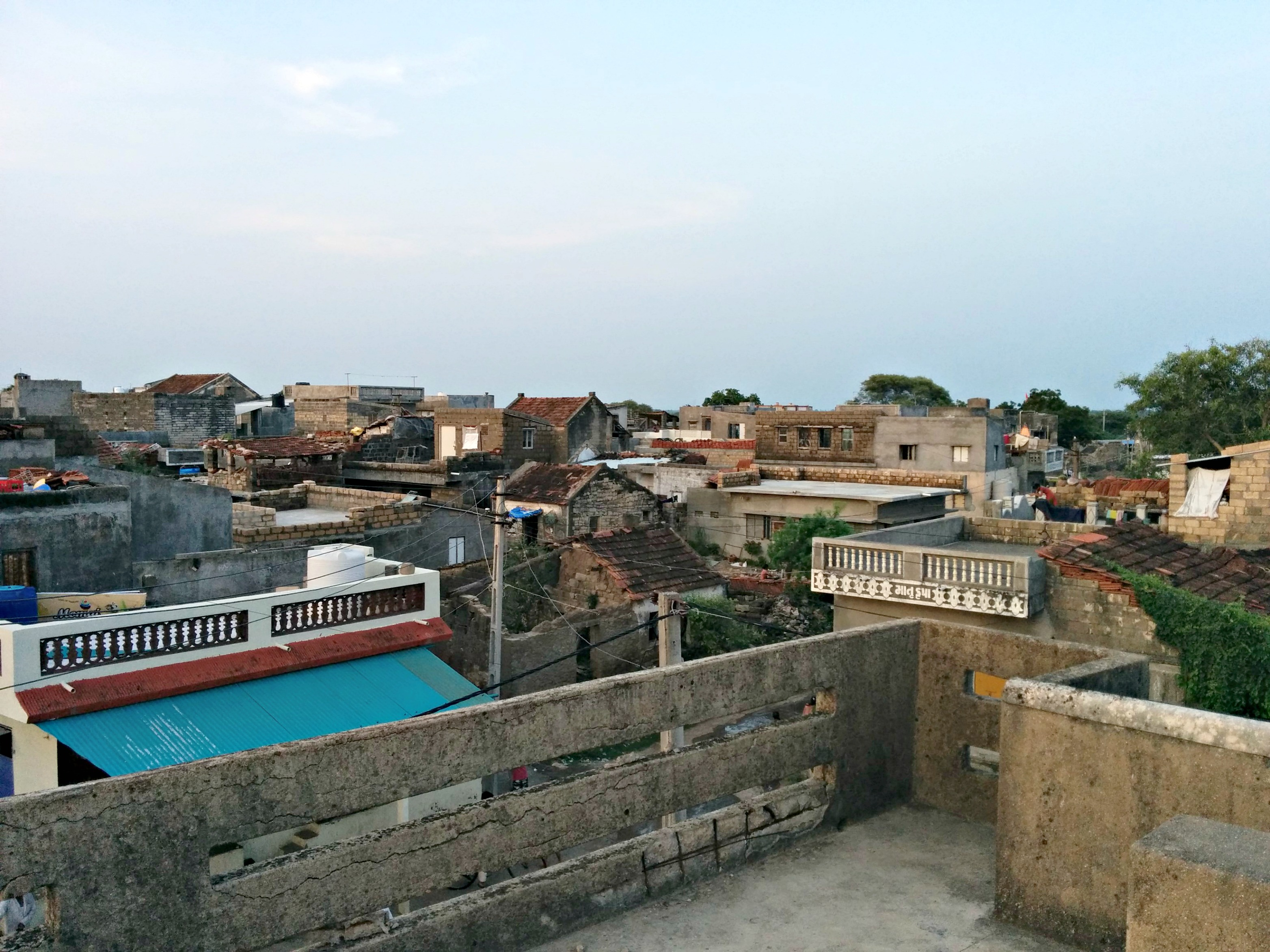

- Location in Gujarat, India Indra (India)
- Coordinates: 21°35′8″N 70°6′41″E
- Country: India
- State: Gujarat
- District: Junagadh

Population (2011)
  - Total: 1,685

Languages
  - Official: Gujarati, Hindi
- Time zone: UTC+5:30 (IST)
- PIN: 362640
- Telephone code: 02874
- Vehicle registration: GJ
- Nearest city: Manavadar
- Literacy: 76.88%
- Website: gujaratindia.com

Indra is a village in Junagdh District in the state of Gujarat, India. It is located 41 km west of the district headquarters of Junagadh.

As of the 2001 India census, there were 1685 people residing in Indra. 842 of which were male (49.97%) and 843 were female (50.03%). Indra has an average literacy rate of 76.88%. The PIN code of Indra is 362640 and the postal head office is Sardargadh.

== Nearby settlements ==
Nearby villages to Indra include:

- Vada (4 km)
- Gana (4 km)
- Bhindora (4 km)
- Buri (5 km)
- Sherdi (3 km)
- Manavadar
- Bantwa
- Upleta
- Keshod
- Junagadh

Indra is bordered by Kutiyana Taluka towards the west, Upleta Taluka towards the north, and Vanthali Taluka and Dhoraji Taluka towards the east.

== Politics ==
INC and BJP are the major political parties in Indra.
