= Indra, Estonia =

Village in Estonia

Indra küla
- Location within Estonia
- Coordinates: 57°45′58″N 27°17′10″E
- Country: Estonia
- County: Võru County
- Municipality: Võru Parish

Population
  - Total: 15

Indra is a village in Estonia, in Võru Parish, which belongs to Võru County.
