= Indrė =

- Gender: Female
- Name day: 29 April

Origin
- Region of origin: Lithuania

Indrė is a Lithuanian feminine given name. Individuals bearing the name Indrė include:

- Indrė Jakubaitytė (born 1976), Lithuanian javelin thrower
- Indrė Girdauskaitė (born 1998), Lithuanian diver
- Indrė Šerpytytė (born 1983), Lithuanian artist
- Indrė Sorokaitė (born 1988), Lithuanian-born Italian volleyball player
- Indrė Valaitė (born 1983), Lithuanian orienteer
- Indrė Valantinaitė (born 1984), Lithuanian poet
- Indre Viskontas, Lithuanian-Canadian neuroscientist and operatic soprano
