= Indrajala =

Sanskrit word

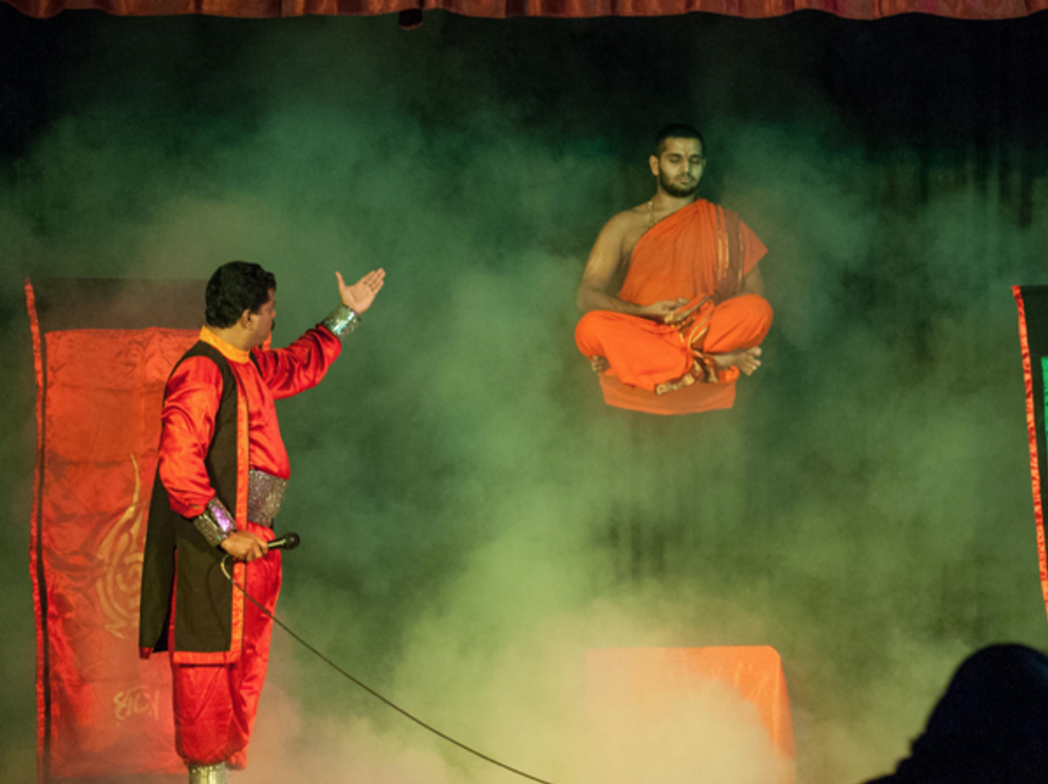

Indrajala (Sanskrit: इन्द्रजाल) is a Sanskrit word common to most Indian languages that means Indra's net, magic, deception, fraud, illusion, conjuring, jugglery, sorcery etc.

In Hinduism the first creator of maya in this universe was Indra. The term Indrajala was used instead of maya in the ancient days. Since Indra represents God and God's creation of this universe can be considered a magical act, this whole world is Indrajala (a net of Indra), an illusion.

In a similar fashion, the human magician applies the magic called Indrajala in imitation of his divine forerunners, and thus spreads his net of maya over those he chooses as the object of his manipulations. He creates something before the eyes of the spectators that does not really exist, or only exist in the spectators’ minds as a result of his skill.

If one confines Indrajala to its stricter sense of illusory appearances created for the public, it is understandable that this activity was apt to become an image for the great illusion to hold ignorant mankind in its grasp. According to the Advaita philosophers there is no difference between avidya (ignorance) and moha ("delusion") as factors that lead to human bondage.

Magic and Religion sometimes go together. The most important source for the knowledge of Vedic magic is Atharvaveda. Those mantras of the Vedas that are meant for shanti, for allaying fears and evils, for greater welfare and for extension of life, etc., are called pratyangiramantrah or atharvanah, but those meant for harming others, i.e., abhichara, are called angiramantrah or angirasah.

Hindu belief contends that the fundamental power of Brahman—which penetrates existence and is neutral by itself—can be used by qualified specialists for good or evil ends. To scare the enemy is the aim of Indrajala.

Kamandaka and the Puranas include Upeksha, Maya and Indrajala as sub-methods of diplomacy. Indrajala is the use of stratagems for victory over the enemy and according to Kautilya it comes under Bheda.

== See also ==
- Indrajal Comics
- Indra's net, concept of emptiness in Buddhism
- Indra's Net, a book by Rajiv Malhotra
- Philosophy of religion
- Science and religion
