= Upeksha (Indian thought) =

Concept in Indian thought

Upeksha in Sanskrit or Upekkha in Pali means equanimity, non-attachment, even-mindedness or letting go. Upeksha does not mean indifference. It is the fourth element of true love and has as its seed the wisdom of equality that removes all boundaries, discrimination and prejudices while leading to the sublime unity where there is no self and no other; without Upeksha, love becomes possessive. Equanimity or Upeksha grows out of mindfulness, then one becomes master of every situation no matter what the situation is without it one cannot take anything in one’s stride; its significance is that one really lives unconditionally.

The understanding that our happiness and that of others is inseparable moves us directly into the fourth Brahmavihara, Upeksha. Equanimity of Upeksha carries the ability to take a large view and to look over the whole situation not bound by one side or the other, its near-enemy is in-difference which is difficult to recognise because it masquerades on the surface as even-mindedness; indifference causes retreat to a form of denial like repression, don’t care-can’t be bothered attitude.

In Yoga, maîtri, karuna, mudita and upeksha are only different aspects of universal sympathy, which remove all perversities in our nature and unite us with our fellow-men. This is the positive aspect of the mind with reference to abstinence from injuring (ahimsa) which will cleanse the mind and make it fit for Śraddhā etc., prepare it to become steady with a view to attaining true discriminative knowledge. It is a karmasthana that holds a very high place in sadhana. Like equality in Bhagavad Gita, upeksha of the Buddhists operates on many levels, and ten kinds of upeksha are enumerated; it is the equality called the six-limbed upeksha which renounces all the creaturely reactions of the six senses when anything agreeable or disagreeable presents itself. Samadhi may also involve the cultivation of the four states called Brahmaviharas which four states are - "goodwill" (maîtri), "compassion" (karuna), "sympathetic joy" (mudita) and "equanimity" (upeksha). Practised to perfection these states take one to pure the mind-states on the plane of formlessness that are proximate to the apex of existence.

Upeksha as a power includes freedom from all kinds of desires and birth because it has no preference for one thing more than the other. It is opposed to individuality. This power manifests as ten kinds which are –

- Sadangopeksha (when there is neither pleasure nor displeasure)
- Brahma-wiharopeksha (when the mind is equally affected towards all beings)
- Bowdyangopeksha (when the mind is equally affected towards all thoughts)
- Wiryopeksha (when the mind is equally affected by the same force of determination)
- Sankharopeksha (when the mind is equally affected towards all kinds of wisdom)
- Wedanopeksha (when the mind is sensible to neither pleasure nor pain)
- Widarsanopeksha (when the mind is not affected by what is seen)
- Tatramadyastopeksha (when all modes of upeksha are applied together)
- Dhyanopeksha (when the impermanency of sensible-objects is regarded with an even mind)
- Parisudi-upeksha (when the mind is equally affected towards all that is necessary to secure freedom from the cleaving to existence).

All upekshas may be possessed by one and the same person but the second cannot be possessed without the first.

According to the Theosophists, maitri, karuna, mudita and upeksha are the four qualities of a Jivanmukta who favours Sishya ("disciple") who attains mukti, Bhakta ("devotee") who gains his noble ends, Udasina ("indifferent person") who begins to cherish love for virtuous deeds and Pathaka (a "sinner") whose sins are purged, and whose lakshanas are akkrodha ("absence of hatred"), arogya ("sound health"), jitendriyathawam ("conquest of passions"), daya (kindness), kshama (forbearance), janapriyathawa (popularity), alobha ("absence of avarice"), dathruthawa (generosity), abhaya (courage) and nairmalaya (cleanliness).

Along with the four upayas (sama, dana, bheda and danda) that were then the recognised expedients for application of foreign policy Kamandaka and others had recommended application of Upeksha, Maya and Indrajala in diplomacy; the enemy could be warded off or neutralised by a policy of Upeksha and absolute indifference to even movements of enemy troops.
