= Louis-Ernest Barrias =

French sculptor (1841–1905)

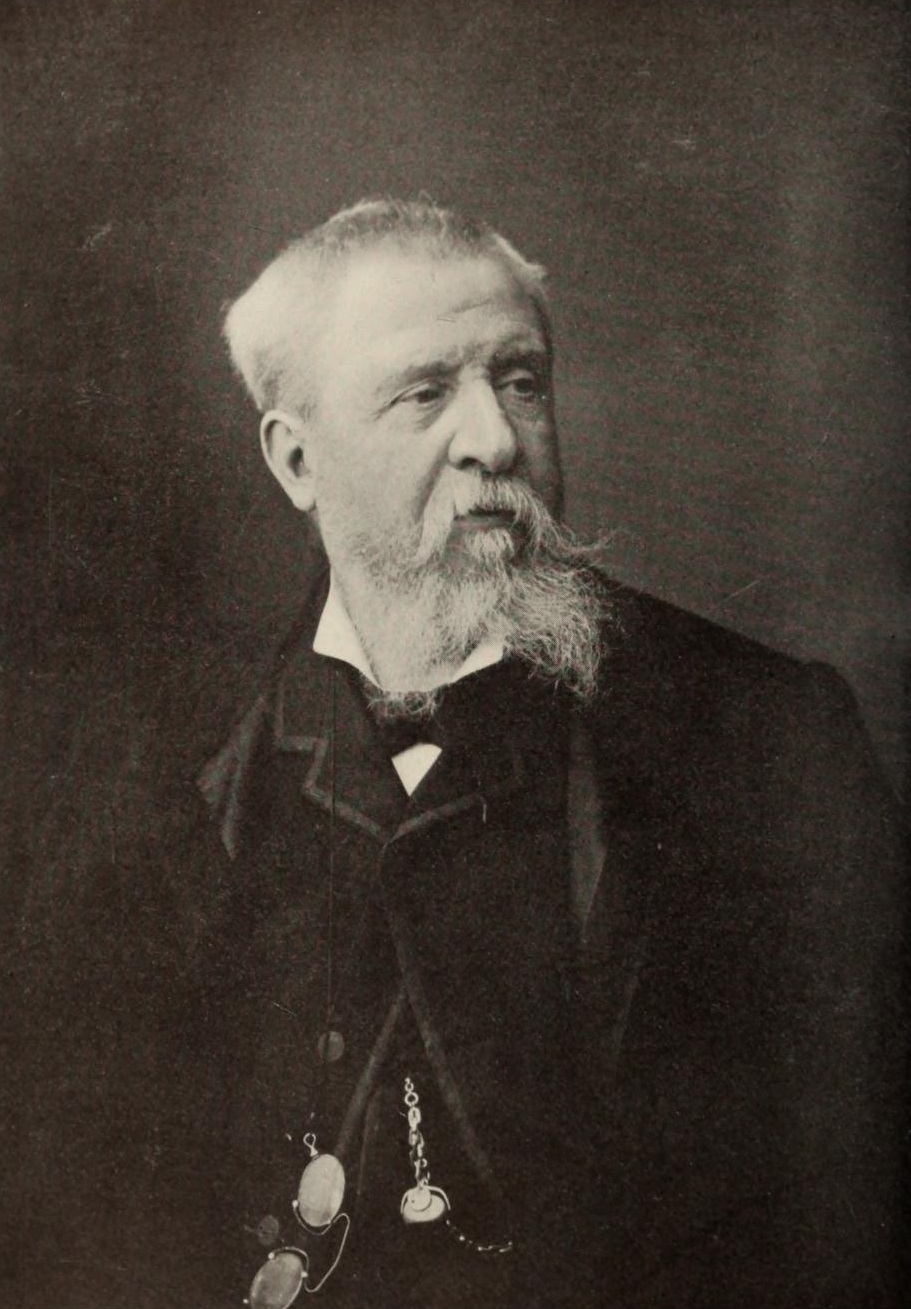
- Louis-Ernest Barrias, c. 1899
- Born: 13 April 1841; Paris, France
- Died: 4 February 1905 (aged 63); Paris, France
- Education: École des Beaux-Arts
- Known for: Sculpture
- Notable work: Jeune Fille de Bou Saada; La Nature se dévoilant devant la Science
- Movement: Romantic; Art Nouveau

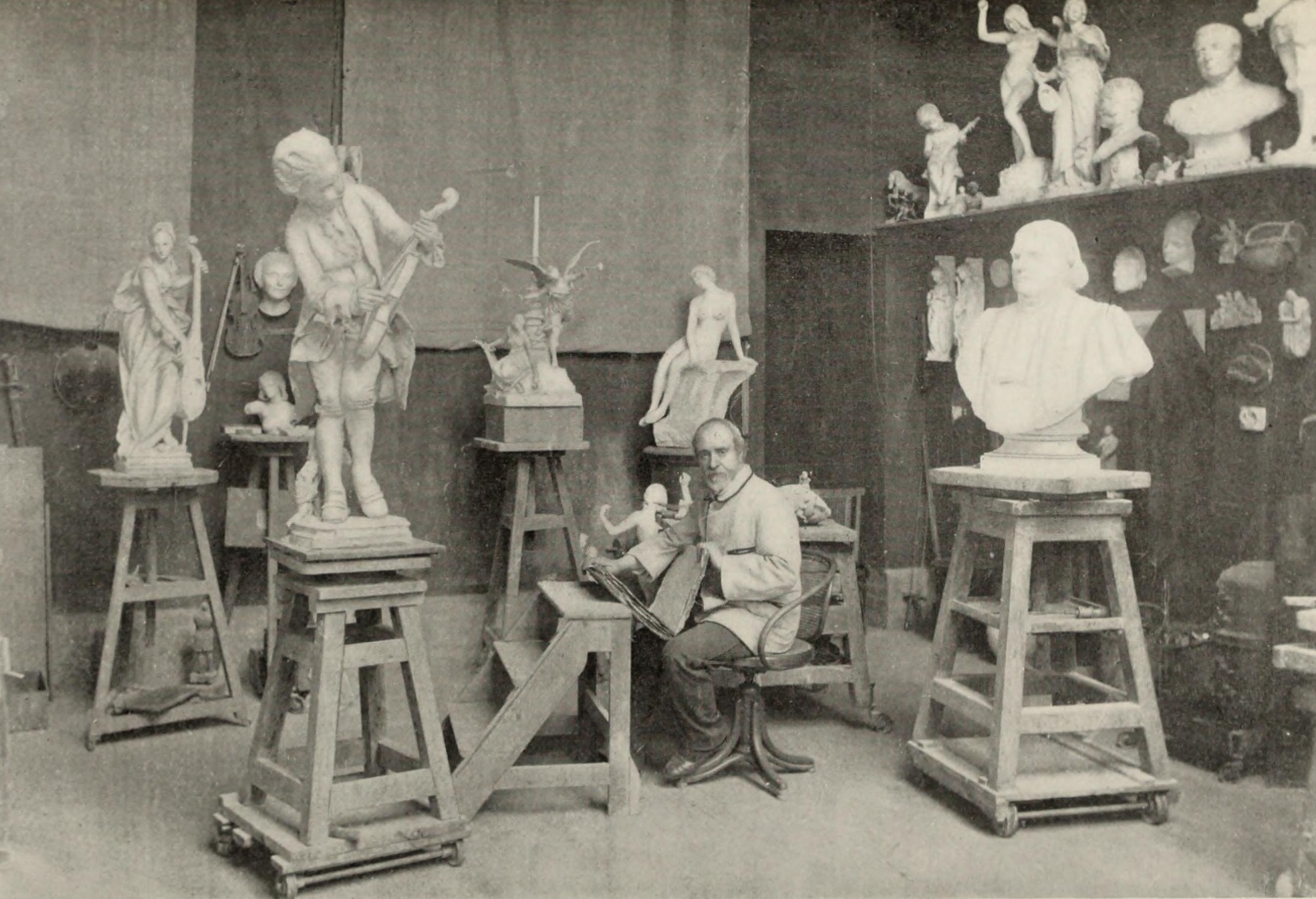
Louis-Ernest Barrias in his Paris studio

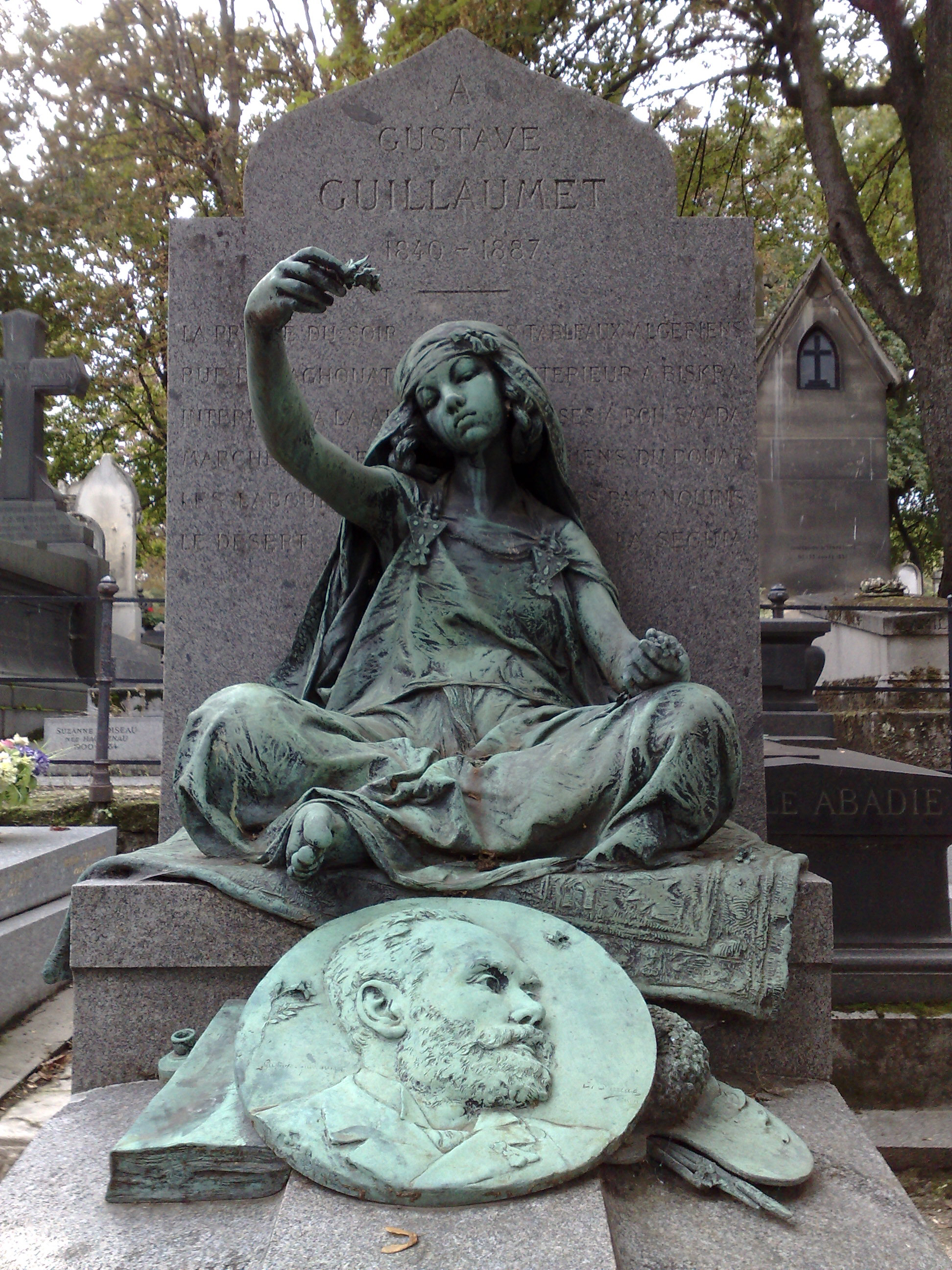
Barrais' sculpture for tomb of Gustave Guillaumet, Montmartre Cemetery, Paris. Young girl from Bou Saâda dropping flowers onto a portrait of Guillaumet

Louis-Ernest Barrias (French: [lwi ɛʁnɛst baʁjas]; 13 April 1841 – 4 February 1905) was a French sculptor of the Beaux-Arts school. In 1865 Barrias won the Prix de Rome for study at the French Academy in Rome.

Barrias was involved in the decoration of the Paris Opéra and the Hôtel de la Païva in the Champs-Élysées. His work was mostly in marble, in a Romantic realist style indebted to Jean-Baptiste Carpeaux.

== Biography ==
He was born in Paris into a family of artists. His father was a porcelain-painter, and his older brother Félix-Joseph Barrias a well-known painter. Louis-Ernest also started out as a painter, studying under Léon Cogniet, but later took up sculpture with Pierre-Jules Cavelier as teacher. In 1858 he was admitted to the École nationale supérieure des Beaux-Arts in Paris, where his teacher was François Jouffroy. In 1865 Barrias won the Prix de Rome for study at the French Academy in Rome. Barrias was involved in the decoration of the Paris Opéra and the Hôtel de la Païva in the Champs-Élysées. His work was mostly in marble, in a Romantic realist style indebted to Jean-Baptiste Carpeaux.

In 1878 he was made a knight of the Legion of Honour, an officer in 1881, and a commander in 1900. Barrias replaced Dumont at the Institut de France in 1884 then succeeded Cavelier as professor at the École des Beaux-Arts. In 1900-03 he served on the Council for the National Museums. Among his students were Josep Clarà, Charles Despiau, Henri Bouchard, Fernand Hamar, and Victor Ségoffin.

Barrias was very influenced by the Art Nouveau style, which was prominent in art during the fin-de-siècle in France. The voluptuous women figures used in many of his sculptures are a product of this time and style. Nature and the erotic was, also, used often in this type style of art, which is seen in many of Barrias's works including, Nature Unveiling Herself Before Science. This piece was made in 1899, when this style was popular. Another sculpture by Barrias is Portrait of the Young Mozart. He also often used literary references in his sculptures (Fusco, Peter, and H. W, Janson, eds. The Romantics to Rodin. New York: Los Angeles County Museum of Art, 1980. Print).

Barrias died in Paris on 4 February 1905.

== Selected works ==
At Père Lachaise Cemetery:

- Tomb of Thomas Couture (c. 1879)
- Tomb of Anatole de La Forge (1893)

At the Jardin des Tuileries:

- The Oath of Spartacus (1869, illustrated)

At La Défense:

- La Défense de Paris (bronze) Monument to the defenders of Paris in 1870 (1880–1883). The plaster model was shown at the Paris Salon of 1881, now in the Petit Palais.

At the Musée d'Orsay:

- Nature Unveiling Herself before Science (1899)
- Bust of Henri Regnault (1871)
- Nubian Alligator Hunters (1893–1894)

At Dreux:

- Funeral monument of the duchesse d'Alençon.

In private collections:

- First Mourning, Adam and Eve carrying Abel (1878)
- Fame (c. 1893)

== Image gallery ==
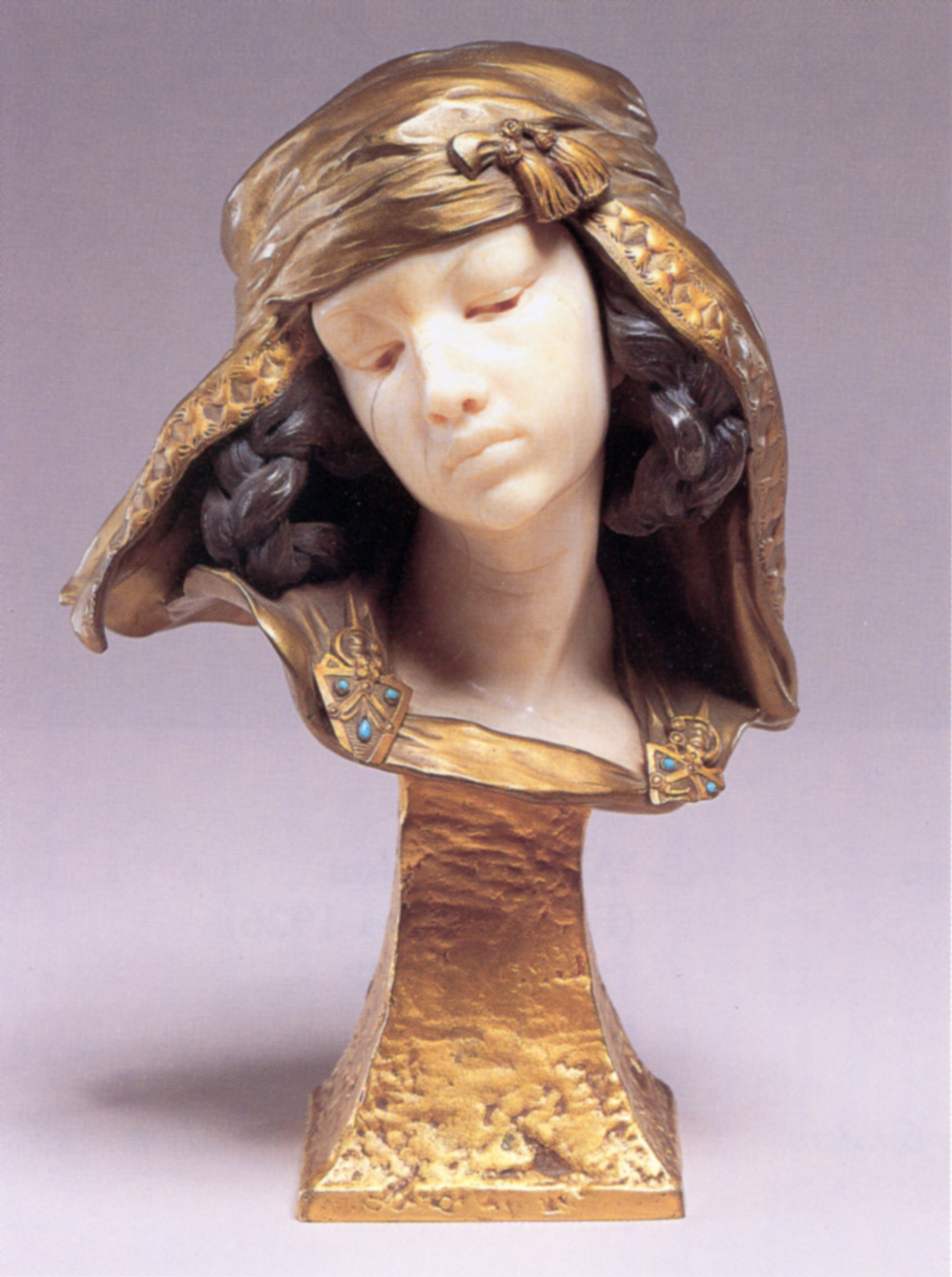
La Jeune Fille de Bou Saada

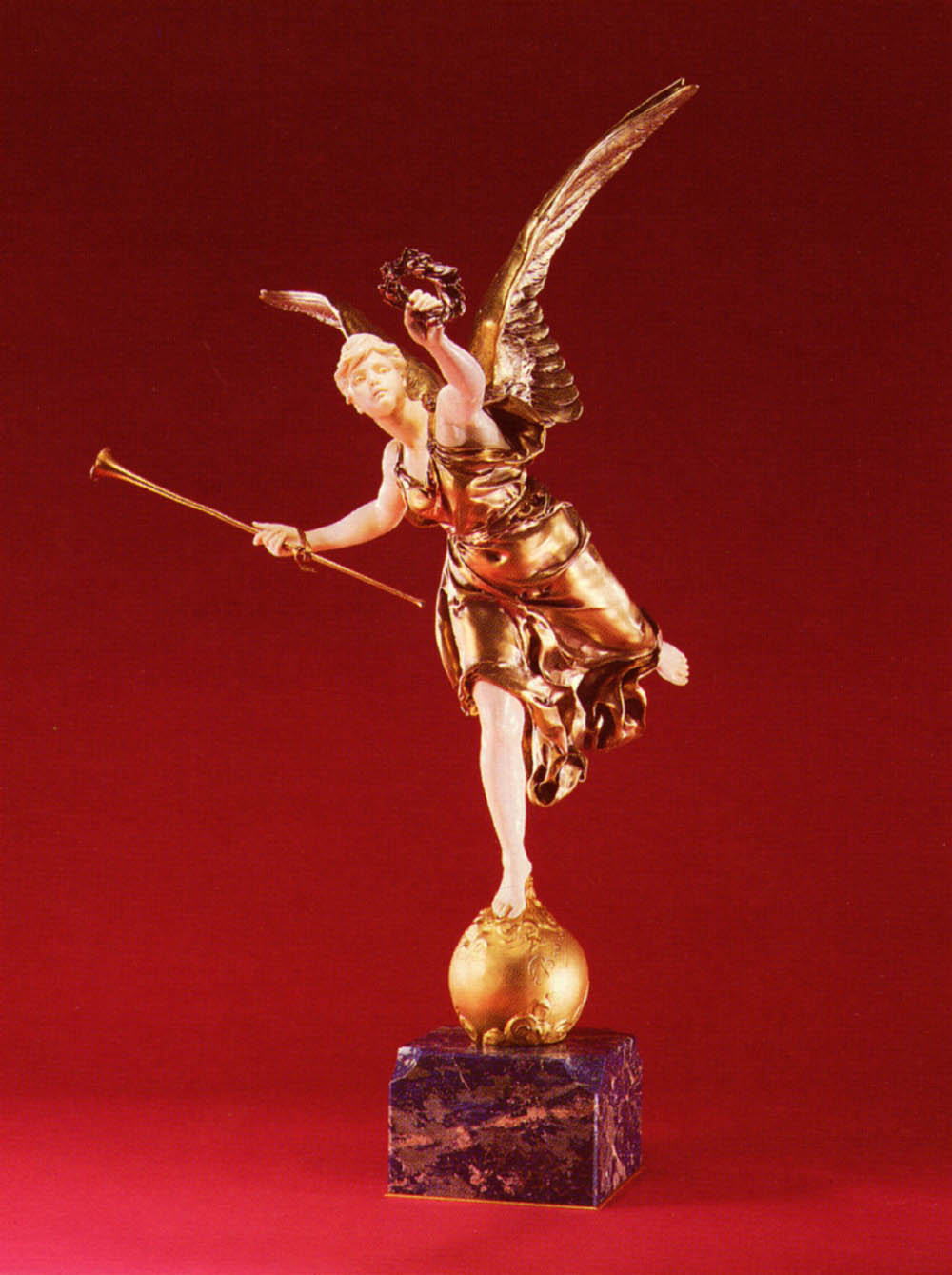
Louis Ernest La Renomee

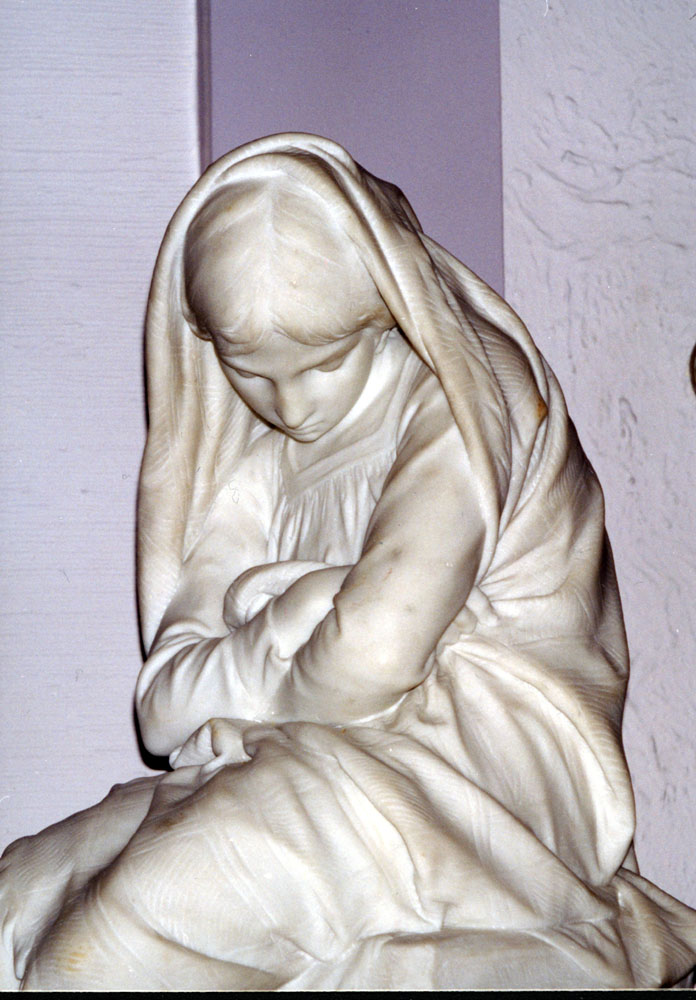
Flower of Winter

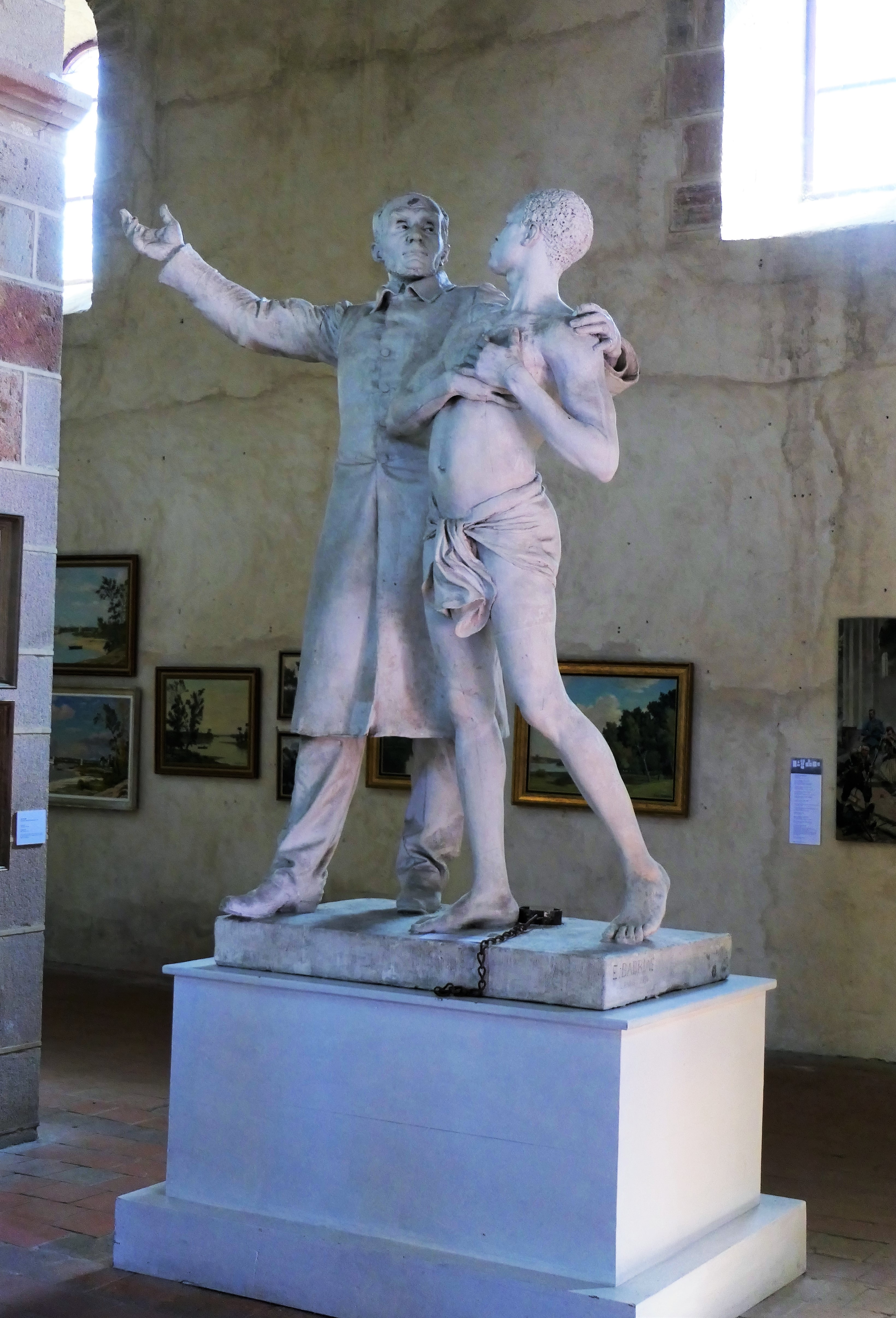
Libération des noirs, 1896 (Musée Saint-Nazaire, Bourbon-Lancy)

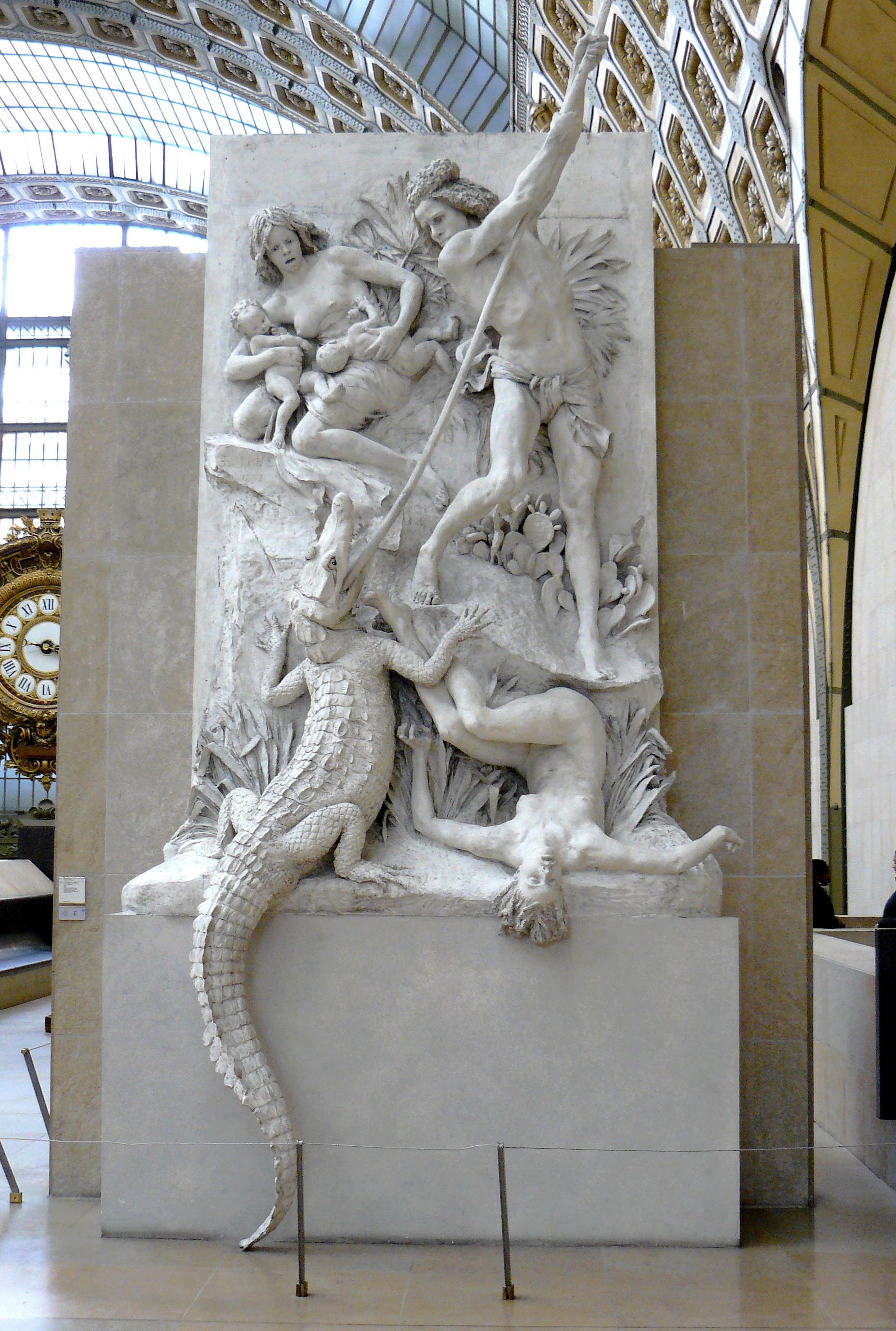
Les Chasseurs d'alligators ou Les Nubiens, 1894 (Muséum d'Histoire Naturelle, Paris)

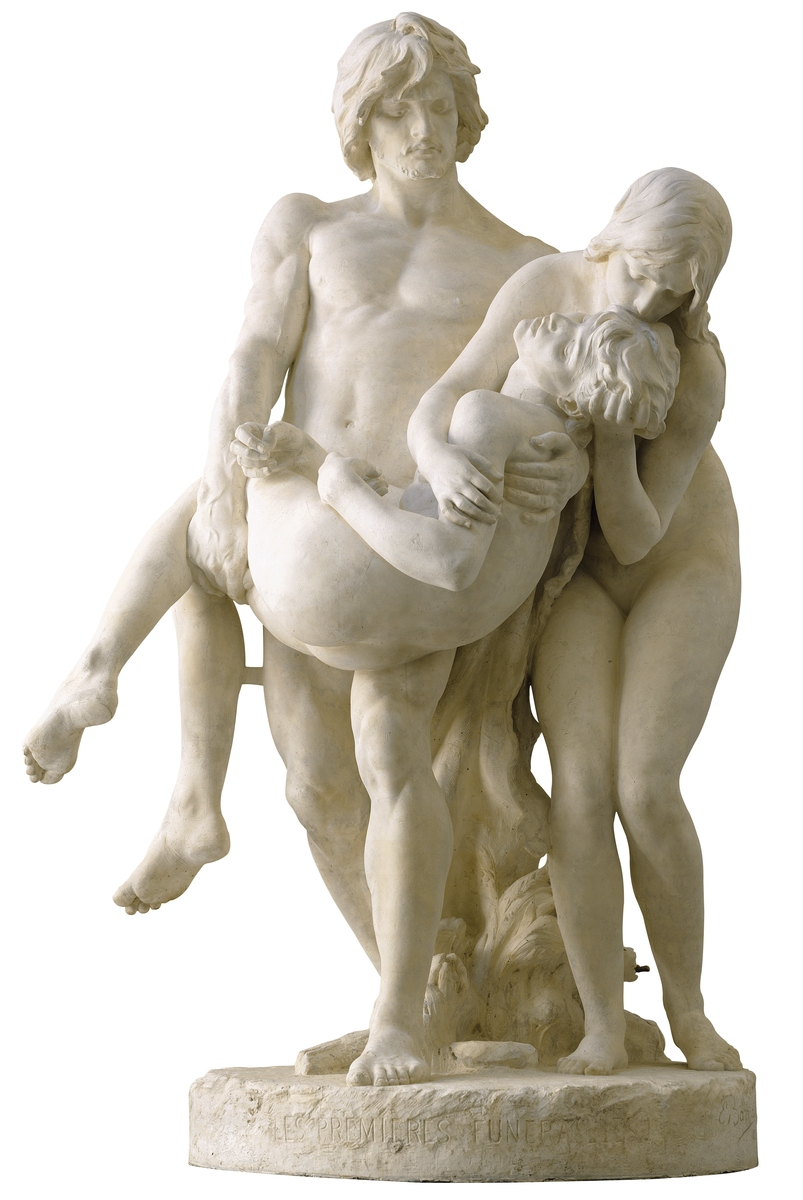
The First Funeral or Adam and Eve carrying the body of Abel, 1878 (Petit Palais, Paris)

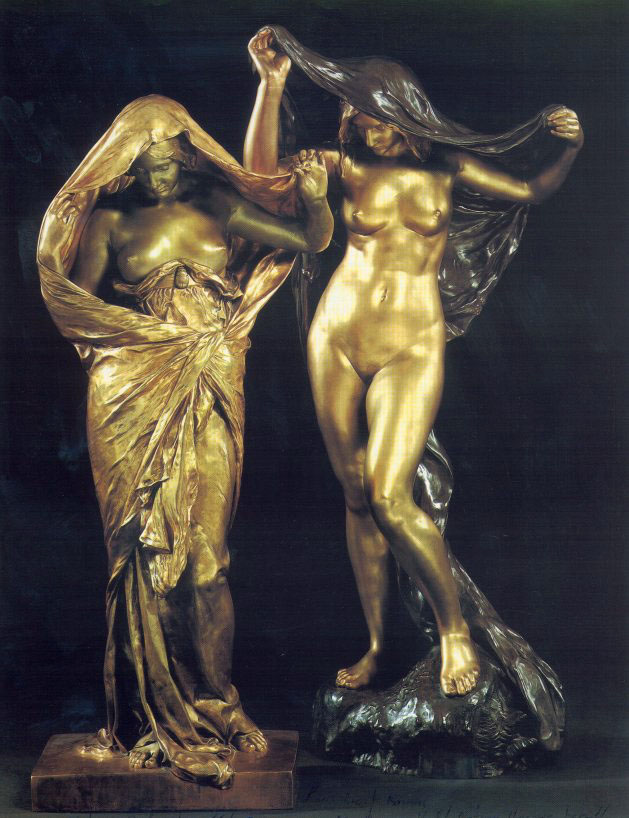
Nature Reveals Herself to Science, bronze

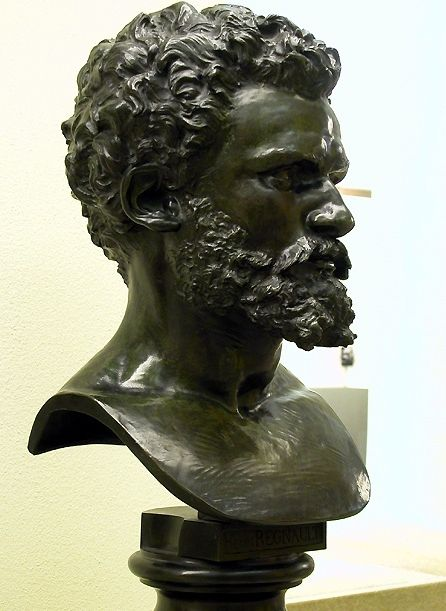
Bust of Henri Regnault, 1871 (Musée d'Orsay, Paris)

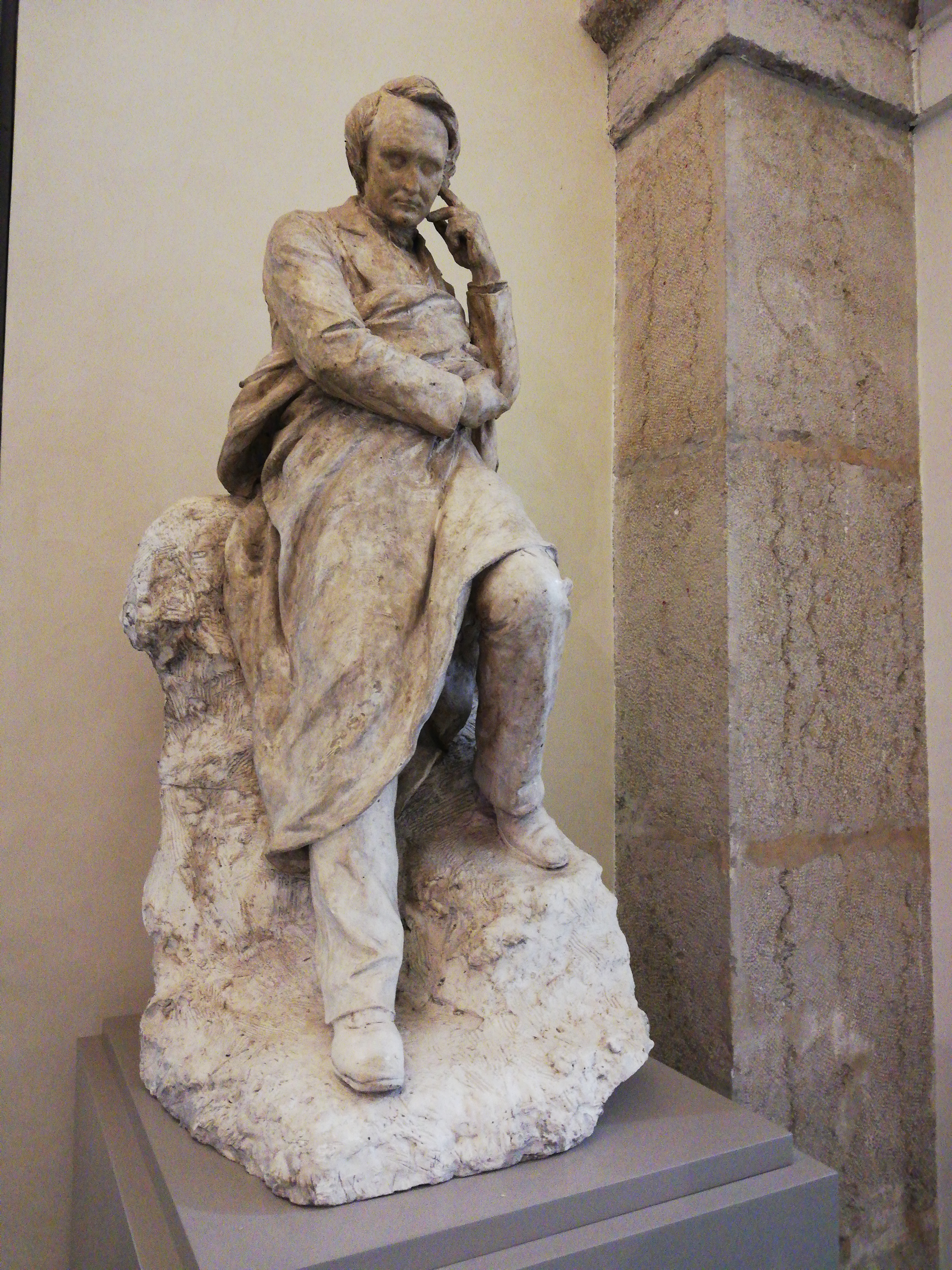
Statue of Victor Hugo, 1896-1900 (Musée des Beaux-Arts, Lyon)

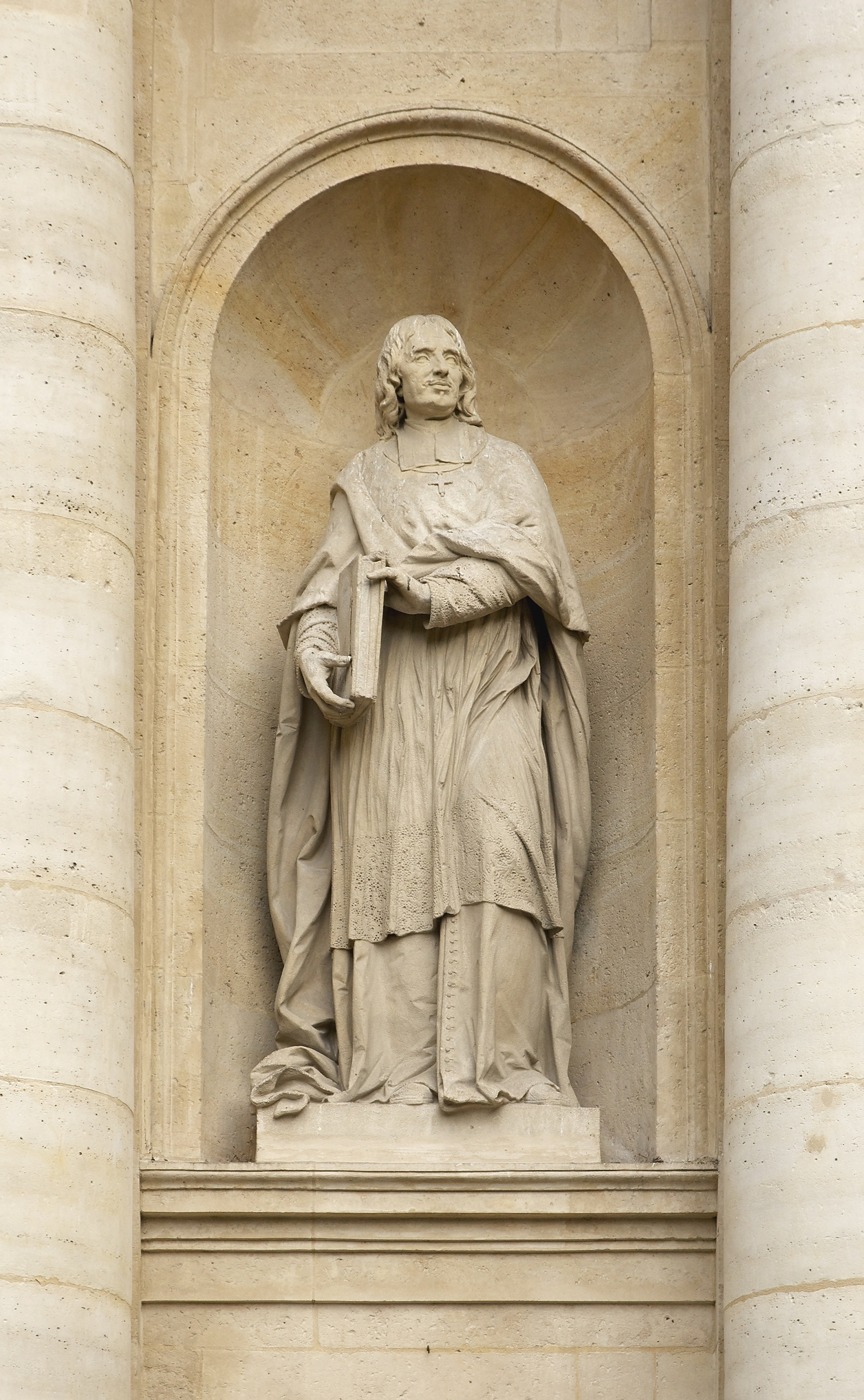
Statue of Jacques-Bénigne Bossuet, (Façade of the chapel of the Sorbonne, Paris)

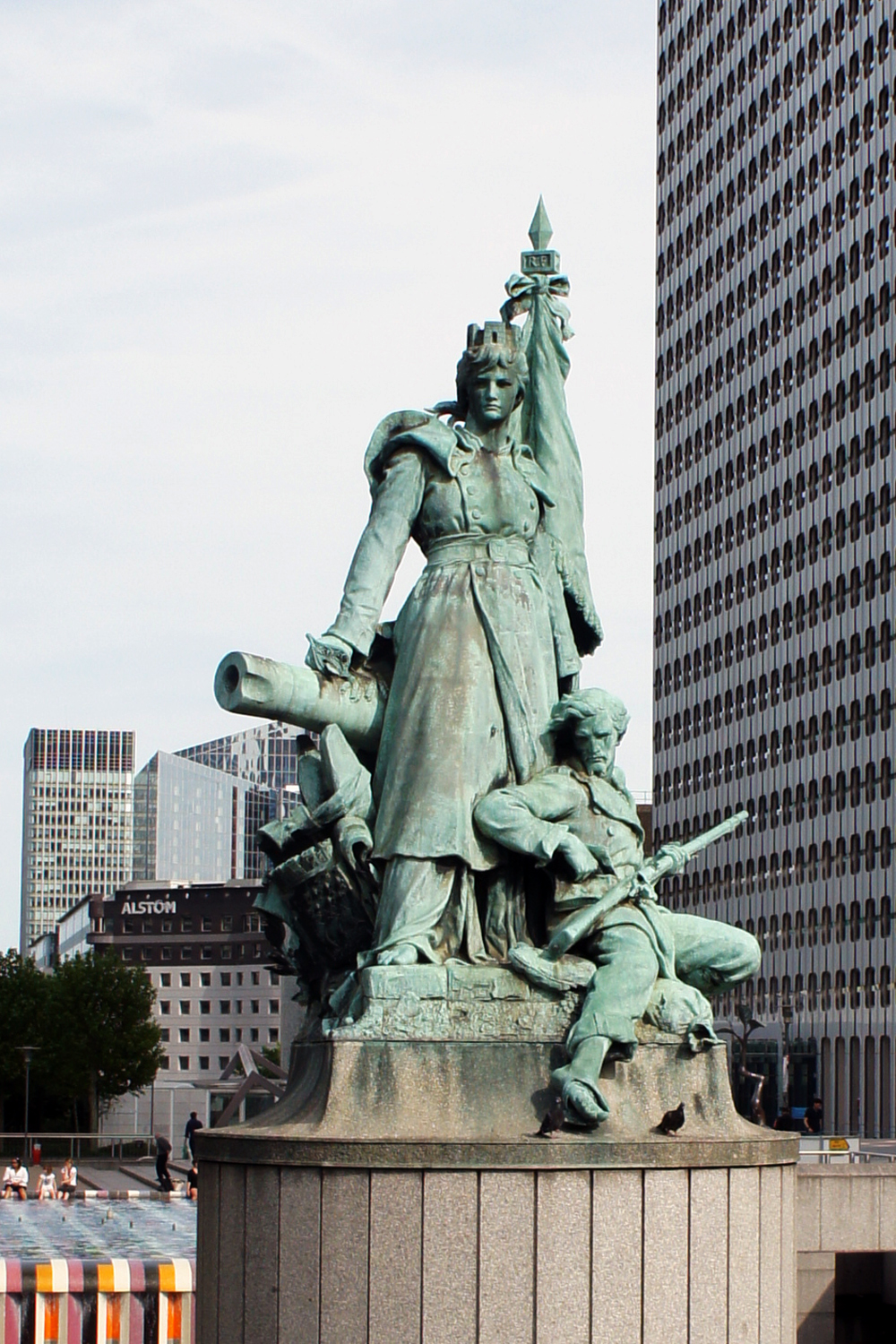
La Défense de Paris
