= Indra (surname) =

Indra (feminine: Indrová) is a Czech surname. It is a dialectical form of the name Jindra, which is a shortened form of Jindřich. Notable people with the surname include:

- Alois Indra (1921–1990), Slovak politician
- Hubert Indra (born 1957), Italian decathlete
- Marek Indra (born 1989), Czech ice hockey player
- Patrik Indra (born 1997), Czech volleyball player
