= Indra (given name) =

Unisex given name

- Gender: Female, Male
- Name day: February 1

Origin
- Region of origin: India, Nepal, Latvia

Indra is a given name which occurs independently in Latvia, where it is feminine, and in India and Nepal, where it can be masculine or, less often, feminine. In Latvia, the associated name day is February 1.

== Notable people named Indra ==
- Indra III (c. 9th century), Rashtrakutan king
- Indra IV (c. 9th century), Rashtrakutan king
- Indra, Crown Princess of Nepal (1926–1950), Nepalese princess
- Indra (born 1967), Swedish singer
- Indra Brown (born 2010), Australian freestyle skier
- Indra Sahdan Daud (born 1979), Singaporean footballer
- Indra Devi (1899–2002), born Eugenie Peterson, Latvian yogini
- Indra Gunawan (1947–2009), Indonesian badminton player
- Indra Gunawan (born 1982), Indonesian footballer
- Indra Gunawan (born 1988), Indonesian swimmer
- Indra Joshi, British physician
- Indra Putra Mahayuddin (born 1981), Malaysian footballer
- Indra Nooyi (born 1955), Indian-American businesswoman
- Indra Bahadur Rai (1927–2018), Indian author
- Agus Indra Udayana, Indonesian social worker
- Indra Wijaya (born 1974), Indonesian badminton player
- Indra (1875–1915), pen name of Armenian writer Diran Chrakian
- Indra Wijaya Ibrahim, Singaporean drug addict and killer
- Indra Sinanan Ojah-Maharaj, Trinidad and Tobago politician

== Fictional characters ==
- Indra Chaudhari, the protagonist of Axiom Verge 2

Indra grounder warrior on the CW's post apocalyptic series the 100.
