= Senryu Girl =

Japanese manga and anime series

- First tankōbon volume cover, featuring Nanako Yukishiro

川柳少女 (Senryū Shōjo)
- Genre: Romantic comedy; Slice of life
- Manga
- Written by: Masakuni Igarashi
- Published by: Kodansha
- Imprint: Shōnen Magazine Comics
- Magazine: Weekly Shōnen Magazine
- Original run: October 19, 2016 – April 22, 2020
- Volumes: 13
- Anime television series
- Directed by: Masato Jinbo
- Produced by: Makoto Furukawa; Hiroshi Kamei; Chitose Kawazoe; Rina Shinoda
- Written by: Masato Jinbo
- Music by: Akiyuki Tateyama
- Studio: Connect
- Licensed by: Sentai Filmworks (worldwide rights excluding Asia): SEA: Muse Communication
- Original network: MBS, TBS, BS-TBS
- Original run: April 6, 2019 – June 22, 2019
- Episodes: 12
- icon

Senryu Girl (Japanese: 川柳少女, Hepburn: Senryū Shōjo), also romanized as Senryuu Shojo, is a Japanese manga series written and illustrated by Masakuni Igarashi. The series was serialized in Kodansha's Weekly Shōnen Magazine from October 2016 to April 2020, and has been compiled into thirteen tankōbon volumes. An anime television series adaptation by Connect aired from April to June 2019.

== Plot ==
The story focuses on the relationship between Nanako Yukishiro, a girl who only communicates through senryū written on tanzaku (hence the title), and Eiji Busujima, an ex-delinquent who attempts to write his own senryū. The story follows their different takes on everyday life through their senryu. Most chapters take the form of a collection of yonkomas with a few more traditional pages thrown in; these tell the chapter's story when read in order.

== Characters ==
Nanako Yukishiro (雪白 七々子, Yukishiro Nanako)
Voiced by: Kana Hanazawa (Japanese); Natalie Rial (English)
A high school girl who is taciturn and not good with verbal communication, instead of communicating exclusively through senryu, a form of haiku. A member of the Literature club, she is deeply enamored with Eiji and is very fond and accepting of him. She is seen as clumsy and a bit of an airhead.
Eiji Busujima (毒島 エイジ, Busujima Eiji)
Voiced by: Tasuku Hatanaka (Japanese); Adam Gibbs (English)
An ex-delinquent who develops feelings for Nanako. A member of the Literature club, he also attempts to write his own senryu despite his clear lack of talent. His slit, glaring eyes make him very intimidating to many and made him a target for other delinquents. Always seen in a gakuran with a white hoodie underneath, he is very caring towards Nanako, albeit being dense and gullible. Eiji is ranked second in terms of disconnect between their tough exterior and their club affiliation. Furthermore, Eiji dotes and adores his younger sister, Hanabi Busujima.
Amane Katagiri (片桐 アマネ, Katagiri Amane)
Voiced by: Sayuri Yahagi (Japanese); Whitney Rodgers (English)
The president of the Literature club who is highly supportive of Nanako's attempts to woo Eiji. She loves to stalk the two in order to spy on their intimate moments. One of the highest-ranking in academics within her year group, she works multiple part-time jobs. She is also a well-accomplished novelist, though she keeps the fact hidden from both Nanako and Eiji. However, Nanako and Eiji quickly find out her secret.
Koto Ōtsuki (大月 琴, Ōtsuki Koto)
Voiced by: Rikako Aida (Japanese); Olivia Swasey (English)
Eiji's childhood friend who is older by two years and attends the same high school as him. President of the "Modern US army combative" club, she has a very developed figure and a strong physique. Dotes on Eiji a lot and loves to tease him, as well as Nanako. While she seems to support Nanako and Eiji, she seems to have some feelings for Eiji herself. Coincidentally, Koto is ranked first in terms of disconnect between their tough exterior and their club affiliation.
Kino Yakobe (矢工部 キノ, Yakobe Kino)
Voiced by: Misaki Kuno (Japanese); Allison Sumrall (English)
A very shy high school student who prefers to communicate through her drawings. Like Nanako, she does not speak through verbal communication. Additionally, she gets very nervous when interacting eye to eye, so she sketches out her face on her sketchpad and holds it up when communicating.
Tao Hanakai (花買 タオ, Hanakai Tao)
Voiced by: Sumire Uesaka (Japanese); Carli Mosier (English)
A gloomy and blunt high school girl famous for her highly accurate divinations as a fortune teller. She hides her identity as a fortune teller at school by parting her hair in the opposite direction. She relies on her fortune-telling for everything that she does. She has never been wrong with her fortunes.
Hanabi Busujima (毒島 花火, Busujima Hanabi)
Voiced by: Suzuko Hara (Japanese); Hillary Haag (English)
The younger sister of Eiji Busujima. Eiji constantly dotes on her as she is young. She is seen a couple of times throughout the series and often says lines that are innocent to kids of her age, but makes things awkward for her brother and Nanako.

== Media ==
=== Manga ===
Senryu Girl, written and illustrated by Masakuni Igarashi, was serialized in Kodansha's shōnen manga magazine Weekly Shōnen Magazine from October 19, 2016, to April 22, 2020. The 173 individual chapters were collected in 13 tankōbon volumes, released between April 17, 2017, and June 17, 2020.

==== Volumes ====
No.	Release date	ISBN
1	April 17, 2017	978-4-06-395885-0
2	July 17, 2017	978-4-06-510061-5
3	October 17, 2017	978-4-06-510309-8
4	February 16, 2018	978-4-06-510968-7
5	June 15, 2018	978-4-06-511619-7
6	September 14, 2018	978-4-06-512603-5
7	December 17, 2018	978-4-06-513485-6
8	March 15, 2019	978-4-06-514442-8
9	June 17, 2019	978-4-06-515310-9
10	July 17, 2019	978-4-06-515691-9; 978-4-06-515237-9 (LE)
11	October 17, 2019	978-4-06-516448-8; 978-4-06-515238-6 (LE)
12	February 17, 2020	978-4-06-516448-8
13	June 17, 2020	978-4-06-518850-7

=== Anime ===
An anime television series adaptation was announced on December 6, 2018. The series was animated by Connect, with Masato Jinbo directing and writing the series, and Maki Hashimoto designing the characters. It aired from April 6 to June 22, 2019, on the Animeism programming block on MBS, TBS, and BS-TBS. (Note: MBS and TBS listed the show at 25:55 on April 5, which is April 6, 2019 at 1:55 a.m.) Sonoko Inoue performed the series' opening theme song "Kotonoha no Omoi" (コトノハノオモイ), while Rikako Aida performed the series' ending theme song "Ordinary Love". Sentai Filmworks has licensed the series worldwide excluding Asia. Muse Communication licensed the anime in Southeast Asia.

==== Episodes ====
No.	Title	Original release date
1	"The 5-7-5 Girl"; Transliteration: "Go shichi go-kei joshi" (Japanese: 五七五系女子)	April 6, 2019
eiji & nanako, the two characters are introduced & they're personalities revealed. Also it is said that they attend the school lit club.
2	"Nanako's Diet"; Transliteration: "Nanako no Daietto" (Japanese: 七々子のダイエット)	April 13, 2019
Eiji's big sister figure introduces herself & nanako tries on a diet.
3	"Let's Go to the Amusement Park"; Transliteration: "Yūenchi ni ikō" (Japanese: 遊園地に行こう)	April 20, 2019
Eiji & nanako go to an amusement park and have a rank time.
4	"The Canvas Girl"; Transliteration: "Kyanbasu Shōjo" (Japanese: キャンバス少女)	April 27, 2019
Nanako and eiji meet a girl who expresses her thoughts through drawing. Named kino, she later joins the duo in their club and bond with all of them by the art of drawing.
5	"The Fortune Teller Girl"; Transliteration: "Uranai Shōjo" (Japanese: 占い少女)	May 4, 2019
Nanako and eiji meet a fortune telling girl, later finding out that she is their classmate. fortune telling is her side gig. who then later follows to see many romantic moments between each of them.
6	"Nanako's Rebellious Phase"; Transliteration: "Nanako no Hankōki" (Japanese: 七々子の反抗期)	May 11, 2019
Nanako goes to a park date with eiji and her dad thinks she's in her rebellious phase. Which nanako assuades her by bringing him a cake from sale.
7	"Nanako and the Seven Wonders of the Rain"; Transliteration: "Nanako to Ame no Nana Fushigi" (Japanese: 七々子と雨の七不思議)	May 18, 2019
Nanako, eiji & the other two girls fix the rabbit cage & get all the rabbits in the cage. Later that day, nanako & eiji share an umbrella due the club president girl borrowing hers to them.
8	"If Nanako Wore a Swimsuit"; Transliteration: "Nanako ga mizugi ni kigaetara" (Japanese: 七々子が水着に着替えたら)	May 25, 2019
Nanako & the girls buy swimsuits, go to the pool & surprisingly find eiji & her sister hanabi there.
9	"Eiji and Nanako's Dad"; Transliteration: "Eiji to Nanako no Otōsan" (Japanese: エイジと七々子のお父さん)	June 1, 2019
While out to fix his phone, eiji finds all his school companions and then because of nanako's urging goes to her home and has a nice time there.
10	"Nanako, Fireflies, and a Test of Courage"; Transliteration: "Nanako to Hotaru to Kimodameshi" (Japanese: 七々子と蛍と肝試し)	June 8, 2019
Nanako and the others embark on a test of courage and have a good time chasing fireflies.
11	"Watching the Fireworks with You"; Transliteration: "Anata to Hanabi o" (Japanese: あなたと花火を)	June 15, 2019
Nanako and eiji go to the local festival to see the fireworks. But she gets sidetracked by her other schoolfriends. She almost misses her chance, but in the nick of time she's found by eiji.
12	"Nanako and Eiji"; Transliteration: "Nanako to Eiji" (Japanese: 七々子とエイジ)	June 22, 2019
Nanako finally reminisces about the time she first met eiji and how from then their relationship would blossom into a fruitful romance.

== Reception ==
The anime adaptation generated over 100,000 copies for manga sales.

The manga has over 600,000 copies sold in print.

== See also ==
- Detectives These Days Are Crazy!, another manga series by the same author
- Tune In to the Midnight Heart, another manga series by the same author
