= Adam Gibbs =

American voice actor

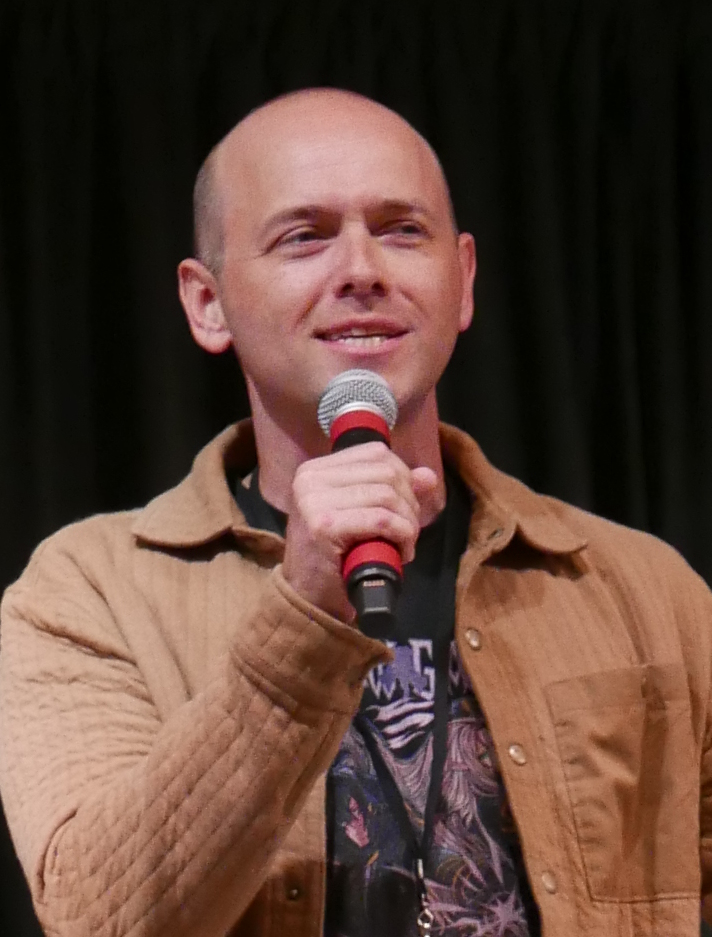
- Gibbs in 2026
- Occupation: Voice actor
- Spouse: Rebekah Stevens
- Website: www.iamadamgibbs.com

Adam Gibbs is an American voice actor who provides voices for English versions of Japanese anime series. He is known for his lead roles of Ryo from 7 Seeds, Hotaro Oreki from Hyouka, Masaya Hinata from Aokana: Four Rhythm Across the Blue, Takashi Natsume from Natsume's Book of Friends, Shinichi Izumi from Parasyte, Hachiman Hikigaya from the My Youth Romantic Comedy Is Wrong, As I Expected series, Seiya Kanie from Amagi Brilliant Park, Taichi Mashima from Chihayafuru, Kei Kuramoto from Flying Witch, Hiromi Nase from Beyond the Boundary series, Ikki from Saint Seiya, Fumiya Tomozaki in Bottom-tier Character Tomozaki, and Nice from Hamatora. As of March 2026, he is best known for his role as Ryo from 7 Seeds, with Gibbs' also best known role being Shinichi Izumi from Parasyte.

== Biography ==
Gibbs is associated with Sentai Filmworks and Funimation. He also acts at Theatre Under the Stars, Classical Theatre Company, Alley Theatre, and Stages Repertory.

== Filmography ==
=== Anime ===
List of dubbing performances in anime
Year	Title	Role	Notes	Source
2012	Heaven's Memo Pad	Tetsu		
2012	Un-Go	Shinjuro Yuki		
2013	Penguindrum	Felzel; Sanetoshi Watase (Eps. 13-24); Satoshi		
2013	Kamisama Dolls	Koushiro Hyuga		
2013	Scarlet Fragments	Zwei		
2013	Horizon in the Middle of Nowhere	Muneshige Tachibana, Taizo	Season 2	
2013	Tsuritama	Yuki Sanada		
2013	Hakuoki: Demon of the Fleeting Blossom	Ryunosuke Ibuki		
2013	Say "I love you."	Kakeru Hayakawa		
2014	Hakkenden: Eight Dogs of the East	Joji Sakuraba		
2014	Parasyte - The Maxim	Shinichi Izumi		
2015	Black Bullet	Tamaki Katagiri		
2015	Hamatora	Nice	Also season 2	
2015	Beyond the Boundary	Hiromi Nase		
2015	DRAMAtical Murder	Mizuki		
2015	Chaika - The Coffin Princess	Shin Acura		
2016	Aokana: Four Rhythm Across the Blue	Masaya Hinata		
2016	Re: Hamatora	Nice		
2016	Log Horizon	Kinjo		
2016	Chaika - The Coffin Princess	Shin Acura		
2016	The Disastrous Life of Saiki K.	Metori Saiko	Episodes 23–24	
2017	Amagi Brilliant Park	Seiya Kanie		
2017	Blade Runner: Black Out 2022	Additional Voices		
2017	Diabolik lovers More, Blood	Ruki Mukami		
2017	Is It Wrong to Try to Pick Up Girls in a Dungeon?	Takemikazuchi		
2017	Food Wars! Shokugeki no Soma	Yoshiaki Nikaido	Episode 2	
2017	Gate	Hitoshi Furuta		
2017	Chihayafuru	Taichi Mashima		
2017	Hyouka	Hotaro Oreki		
2017	Flying Witch	Kei Kuramoto		
2017	Handa-kun	Shave		
2017	Haven't You Heard? I'm Sakamoto	Koichoi	Episode 6	
2017–2022	Haikyu!!	Koshi Sugawara		
2018	After the Rain	Nathan/Yamamoto		
2018	Devils' Line	Yuuki Anzai		
2018	Tokyo Ghoul:re	Kuki Urie		
2018	Fairy Tail	Jerome	Final season	
2019	Saint Seiya	Phoenix Ikki	Netflix dub	
2019	Stars Align	Shingo Takenouchi		
2019	Golden Time	Mitsuo Yanagisawa		
2019–2020	My Teen Romantic Comedy SNAFU	Hachiman Hikigaya		
2020	Senryu Girl	Eiji Busujima		
2020–2025	My Hero Academia	Natsuo Todoroki	Season 4 onwards	
2020	The Pet Girl of Sakurasou	Daichi Miyahara		
2021	Bottom-tier Character Tomozaki	Fumiya Tomozaki		
2021	Dororo	Hyakkimaru		
2021	Life Lessons with Uramichi Oniisan	Uramichi Omota		
2021	Kakegurui	Ryota Suzui	Sentai Filmworks dub	
2021	Zombie Land Saga Revenge	Shojiro Ito		
2021	Rumble Garanndoll	Akatsuki		
2022	Iroduku: The World in Colors	Shō Yamabuki		
2022	Natsume's Book of Friends	Takashi Natsume		
2022	My Isekai Life	Rezin		
2022	Vermeil in Gold	Obsidian		
2022	Chainsaw Man	Yutaro Kurose		
2022	The Eminence in Shadow	Cid Kagenou/Shadow		
2023	Farming Life in Another World	Grattz		
2023	Oshi no Ko	Kengo Morimoto	Introduced in Episode 5	
2024	I've Somehow Gotten Stronger When I Improved My Farm-Related Skills	Nedilus		
2024	Helck	Chupabra, Edil		
2024	The Most Heretical Last Boss Queen	Arthur Beresford		
2024	My Instant Death Ability Is So Overpowered	Haruto		
2024	Level 1 Demon Lord and One Room Hero	Fred		
2024	Insomniacs After School	Ganta Nakami		
2024	Dungeon People	Harmein		
2025	Loner Life in Another World	Tanaka		
2025	Rock Is a Lady's Modesty	Ryuichi		
2025	Gachiakuta	Tamsy Caines		

=== Film ===
List of voice performances in direct-to-video and television films
Year	Title	Role	Notes	Source
2012	Towa no Quon	Ryo		
2012	Starship Troopers: Invasion	Shock Jock		
2012	Grave of the Fireflies	Seita		
2013	Mardock Scramble: The Second Combustion	Poker Dealer		
2013	Space Pirate Captain Harlock	Logan		
2014	Mardock Scramble: The Third Exhaust	Marlowe John Fever	Additional voices	
2014	Appleseed Alpha	Olson		
2015	Aura: Koga Maryuin's Last War	Kawai, Osamu Suzuki		
2015	Space Pirate Captain Harlock	Yama / Logan		
2017	Typhoon Noruda	Shuichi Azuma		
2017	Beyond the Boundary: I'll Be Here – Past	Hiroomi Nase		
2017	Beyond the Boundary: I'll Be Here – Future	Hiroomi Nase		
2018	My Hero Academia: Two Heroes	Swordkill		
2021	Gintama: The Very Final	Shoyo Yoshida/Utsuro		
2024	Blue Lock: Episode Nagi	Ranze Kurona		

=== Web ===
Year	Title	Role	Notes	Source
2021	Death Battle	Cloud Strife	Episode 147: "Link VS Cloud"	
