= Sakuya =

Sakuya (さくや, Sakuya) surnames and names.

== Written forms in Japanese ==
- hiragana: さくや

Forms in kanji can include:

- 咲野
- 咲夜
- 咲哉
- 咲也

== People ==
- Sakuya Fujinaga (藤永咲哉, born 2007), K-pop idol, member of NCT
- Sakuya Nakamura (中村 咲哉, born 1998), Japanese actor
- Shunsuke Sakuya (咲野 俊介, born 1965), Japanese actor and voice actor
- Sakuya, in-game name of Remilia (1995–2019), American professional gamer

== Fictional characters ==
- Sakuya Aizawa, a character in the manga series Hayate the Combat Butler
- Sakuya Ayuzawa, a character in the manga series Maid Sama!
- Sakuya Fujitaka, a character in the anime television series Symphogear
- Sakuya Hishigata, a character in the tokusatsu television series Kamen Rider Decade
- Sakuya Izayoi, a character in the Touhou Project series
- Sakuya Hosono, a character in the video game Little Battlers Experience WARS
- Sakuya Kira, a character in the manga series Angel Sanctuary
- Sakuya Kumashiro, a character in the Tenchi Muyo! franchise
- Sakuya Shiomi, a character in the video game Persona 3
- Sakuya Shirase, a character in the video game The Idolmaster Shiny Colors
- Sakuya Shirayuri, a character in the video game Aikatsu Friends!
- Sakuya Tachibana, a character in the tokusatsu television series Kamen Rider Blade
- Sakuya Tachibana, a character in the video game series God Eater
- Sakuya Togane, a character in the anime television series Psycho-Pass
- Sakuya Yamaki, a character in the manga series 7 Seeds
- Sakuya, a character in the manga series Samurai Deeper Kyo
- Sakuya, a character in the visual novel Utawarerumono
- Sakuya, a character in the anime television series Eureka Seven
- Sakuya, a character in the light novel series Sword Art Online
- Sakuya, a character in the original video animation series Genesis Survivor Gaiarth
- Sakuya, a character in the light novel series Sister Princess
- Sakuya, a character in the manga series Indian Summer
- Sakuya, a character in the video game Kuon
- Sakuya, a character in the video game Tales of Innocence
- Sakuya, a character in the manga series Monster Hunter Orage
- Sakuya, a character in the anime television series Legends of the Dark King
- Sakuya, a character in the original video animation series .hack//Quantum
- Sakuya, a character in the video game Shining Blade
- Sakuya Asama, a character in the visual novel Akai Ito
- Sakuya Fujimiya, a character in the visual novel A Good Librarian Like a Good Shepherd
- Sakuya Haibara, a character in the video game Fatal Frame: Mask of the Lunar Eclipse
- Sakuya Hikawa, a character in the tokusatsu television series Kaitou Sentai Lupinranger VS Keisatsu Sentai Patranger
- Sakuya Kamiyama, a character in the original video animation Candy Boy
- Sakuya Kamon, a character in the anime television series Dancouga Nova – Super God Beast Armor
- Sakuya Kawahara, a character in the visual novel I/O
- Sakuya Kurai, a character in the manga series Ms. Vampire Who Lives in My Neighborhood
- Sakuya Le Bel Shirogane, a character in the video game Hatoful Boyfriend
- Sakuya Nijō, a character in the video game Norn9
- Sakuya Ohtor, a character in the visual novel Rewrite
- Sakuya Ookochi, a character in the manga series Sensual Phrase
- Sakuya Sakuma, a character in the video game A3!
- Sakuya Shiina, a character in the manga series Twinkle Stars
- Sakuya Shimazu, a character in the manga series Isuca
- Sakuya Takagi, a character in the manga series Baby Steps
- Sakuya Tsukumo, a character in the light novel series Absolute Duo
- Sakuya Sazanami, a character in the anime television series Star-Myu
- Sakuya Watanuki, a character in the manga series Servamp
- Kagami Sakuya, a character in the visual novel FairChild

== Other uses ==
- Konohanasakuya-hime, a Shinto megami
- Sakuya Konohana Kan, a botanical garden in Tsurumi-ku, Osaka, Japan

== See also ==
- Sakura (disambiguation)
