= Glasses with a Chance of Delinquent =

Japanese manga series

- First tankōbon volume cover, featuring Dan Ichikura (left) and Hiro Momose (right)

メガネ、時々、ヤンキーくん (Megane, Tokidoki, Yankī-kun)
- Genre: Romantic comedy; Yankī
- Manga
- Written by: Naruki
- Published by: Kodansha
- English publisher: NA: Seven Seas Entertainment
- Imprint: Kodansha Comics Betsufure
- Magazine: Bessatsu Friend
- Original run: January 13, 2021 – present
- Volumes: 12
- Anime television series
- Directed by: Makoto Hoshino
- Written by: Megumi Shimizu
- Studio: Studio Flad; Wao World
- Original network: ANN (ABC TV, TV Asahi)
- Original run: April 2027 – scheduled
- icon

Glasses with a Chance of Delinquent (Japanese: メガネ、時々、ヤンキーくん, Hepburn: Megane, Tokidoki, Yankī-kun) is a Japanese manga series written and illustrated by Naruki. It was originally serialized in Kodansha's Bessatsu Friend magazine from January to September 2021, before resuming serialization in the same magazine in June 2022. The series has been compiled into twelve volumes as of November 2026. An anime television series adaptation produced by Studio Flad and Wao World is set to premiere in April 2027.

== Plot ==
Hiro Momose, a student with a difficult history with delinquents, has just enrolled at her new high school. She is happy to be here as the school does not have an issue with delinquency. Due to a school requirement needing students to be a member of a club, she ends up joining the Support Club, which currently has only one other member: her classmate Dan Ichikura. After Ichikura saves her from being harassed by a delinquent, she finds out that Ichikura is a former delinquent. She agrees to keep his past a secret, while the two become closer to each other.

== Characters ==
Hiro Momose (百瀬 尋, Momose Hiro)
Voiced by: Suzuko Hara
A first-year high school student. She has bleached hair, in contrast to her appearance in junior high school where she had black hair and wore glasses. She previously went to a school full of delinquents and was frequently bullied by them. Due to her clumsiness at the time, she was kicked out of her clubs, making her reluctant to join a new club in high school at first.
Dan Ichikura (壱倉 煖, Ichikura Dan)
Voiced by: Hiroto Shimizu
Momose's classmate, who wears glasses. He is now a serious student who is admired by others for being hardworking. He was previously a delinquent and looks back at his past life with regret. Prior to Momose joining, he was the only remaining member of the Support Club, with the club in danger in disbanding due to other members leaving the club or being inactive.
Ohana-chan (オハナちゃん)
Voiced by: Yuma Tomochika

== Media ==
=== Manga ===
The series is written and illustrated by Naruki, who began serializing it in Kodansha's Bessatsu Friend magazine on January 13, 2021; the first tankōbon volume was released on June 11, 2021. The series originally ended serialization on September 13, 2021, with two volumes released. However, due to popular demand, the series resumed serialization in Bessatsu Friend on June 13, 2022. Twelve volumes have been released as of November 2026. The series is licensed in English by Seven Seas Entertainment, which released its first volume on January 14, 2025. It is also serialized in English on Kodansha's K Manga service.

No.	Original release date	Original ISBN	North American release date	North American ISBN
1	June 11, 2021	978-4-06-523597-3	January 14, 2025	979-8-89160-597-8
2	December 13, 2021	978-4-06-526140-8	April 15, 2025	979-8-89160-923-5
3	November 11, 2022	978-4-06-529687-5	July 1, 2025	979-8-89373-017-3
4	April 13, 2023	978-4-06-531339-8	October 21, 2025	979-8-89373-358-7
5	October 13, 2023	978-4-06-533357-0	January 13, 2026	979-8-89160-863-4
6	March 13, 2024	978-4-06-534706-5	April 21, 2026	979-8-89373-620-5
7	August 9, 2024	978-4-06-536617-2	July 14, 2026	979-8-89373-805-6
8	January 10, 2025	978-4-06-538313-1	October 20, 2026	979-8-89561-780-9
9	July 11, 2025	978-4-06-540055-5	January 19, 2027	979-8-89765-910-4
10	December 12, 2025	978-4-06-541721-8	April 20, 2027	979-8-89863-511-4
11	May 13, 2026	978-4-06-543484-0	—	—
12	November 13, 2026	978-4-06-545464-0	—	—

=== Anime ===
An anime television series adaptation was announced on April 23, 2026. It will be produced by Studio Flad and Wao World and directed by Makoto Hoshino, with series composition handled by Megumi Shimizu and characters designed by Ruriko Watanabe. The series is set to premiere in April 2027 on the Animazing!!! programming block on all ANN affiliates, including ABC Television and TV Asahi.

== Reception ==
By December 2025, the series had over 900,000 copies in circulation.
