= Tsuritama =

Japanese anime series

- Japanese volume 1 DVD/Blu-ray cover art, depicting Yuki Sanada

つり球
- Genre: Comedy, science fiction
- Anime television series
- Directed by: Kenji Nakamura
- Written by: Toshiya Ono
- Music by: Kuricorder Quartet
- Studio: A-1 Pictures
- Licensed by: AUS: Hanabee; NA: Sentai Filmworks (former); UK: MVM Films
- Original network: Fuji TV (noitamina)
- Original run: 13 April 2012 – 28 June 2012
- Episodes: 12

Tsuritama (つり球; lit. "fishing ball"), sometimes written as tsuritama, is a Japanese anime television series that aired between 13 April 2012 and 28 June 2012. The anime was licensed by Sentai Filmworks in North America, by MVM Films in the United Kingdom, and Hanabee in Australia and New Zealand.

== Plot ==
Yuki Sanada is a high school student who lives with his grandmother Kate, a woman whose career requires frequent relocation which prevents the boy from establishing any real friendships, much less the social skills necessary to initiate them. Whenever he becomes anxious, he freezes in place, unable to breathe, and feels like he is drowning. During these episodes, he dons a markedly demonic expression—so potent with seemingly latent rage that others become wary of him at its appearance. Shortly after arriving at their home on the grandmother's most recently sanctioned work base, the island of Enoshima, a zealous transfer student named Haru— wielding a water gun and sporting a fish bowl atop his head— appears on their doorstep claiming to be an alien and that he will henceforth be living in the same house; the grandmother agrees to allow such if Haru simply meets one condition (which is undisclosed to the audience). Haru's presence continually makes Yuki uncomfortable. The two also meet a secluded young fisher, Natsuki Usami, nicknamed "The Fishing Prince" and an Indian man named Akira, who watches Haru from a distance with his duck Tapioca.

== Characters ==
=== Main characters ===
Yuki Sanada (真田 ユキ, Sanada Yuki)
Voiced by: Ryōta Ōsaka (Japanese); Adam Gibbs (English)
Yuki has bright red hair, is socially inept and when afraid or nervous, makes a horrible, demonic face. He frequently consults his phone for information on various topics. When put on the spot, he mentally creates a scenario where he is drowning as a reaction to stress. Yuki's a bit afraid of Natsuki, and thinks Haru is very weird and usually tries to avoid him. He lives with his French grandmother, and is fond of the ocean and air in Enoshima. Dragged by Haru to learn to fish against his will, he ends up becoming very fond of it.
Haru (ハル)
Voiced by: Miyu Irino (Japanese); Clint Bickham (English)
Haru has blonde hair, purple eyes and long eyelashes, and is very cheerful and charismatic. He was a transfer student along with Yuki, and introduces himself as an alien, which people think is a joke due to his enthusiastic behaviour, although there are some indictations that may prove it true. He is seen carrying a fish in a fish bowl on his head, who refers to Haru as "brother". When upset with people's actions, he shoots them with a bright green water pistol, making it possible for him to briefly control their actions. Haru and his sister are on a secret mission on Earth to save it, and for some reason, they need Yuki to learn to fish in order to accomplish it. He is able to telepathically communicate with his sister via water. Later it is revealed that both Haru and his sister are fish beings from another world, with the mission of capturing one of their kind who is threatening the people of Enoshima with its mind control powers, thus Haru needs someone to fish it while he nullifies its powers with his own.
Natsuki Usami (宇佐美 夏樹, Usami Natsuki)
Voiced by: Koki Uchiyama (Japanese); Corey Hartzog (English)
A native of Enoshima, Natsuki has black hair and glasses, with a generally irritated expression. He doesn't seem to like interacting with many people but is well known for his participation in national fishing competitions, resulting in the nickname, "Fishing Prince". By Haru and Yuki's insistence, he ends up teaching them to fish, soon becoming close friends with them. He has a soft spot for his younger sister, Sakura, his entire demeanor changing when talking with her.
Akira Agarkar Yamada (アキラ・アガルカール・山田, Akira Agarukāru Yamada)
Voiced by: Tomokazu Sugita (Japanese); Jessie James Grelle (English)
A mysterious and stoic Indian man, always accompanied by his duck named Tapioca. He and his servants spy on Haru under orders of the mysterious organization called "DUCK" (an acronym for Defensive Universal Confidential Keepers). To further investigate Haru, Akira transfers into Yuki's class, despite being 25 years old, and ends up joining Yuki and the others in their fishing activities. He is also an experienced fisherman.

=== Secondary characters ===
Kate (ケイト, Keito)
Voiced by: Fumi Hirano (Japanese); Allison Keith-Shipp (English)
Yuki's grandmother. She's French, and has a warm and cheerful personality. She allowed Haru to live with her and Yuki. She often gives Haru advice concerning his relationship with Yuki and human social interactions. She works at the Samuel Cocking Garden in Enoshima.
Coco (ココ, Koko)
Voiced by: Emiri Katō (Japanese); Tiffany Grant (English)
Haru's little sister. She also shoots people with a water pistol shaped like a dolphin, making it also possible for her to briefly control their actions. She has some doubts if Yuki will be able to help with their mission, despite Haru's insistence that he is the perfect choice. She is occasionally shown to appear as a fish.
Ayumi Inoue (井上 歩, Inoue Ayumi)
Voiced by: Daisuke Hosomi (Japanese); David Wald (English)
He is the captain of a fishing boat called Seishunmaru. He has a crush on Misaki.
Misaki (海咲)
Voiced by: Miina Tominaga (Japanese); Maggie Flecknoe (English)
Shopkeeper in the fishing shop called "Hemingway".
Tamotsu Usami (宇佐美 保, Usami Tamotsu)
Voiced by: Shirō Saitō (Japanese); Andrew Love (English)
Natsuki and Sakura's father. Him and Natsuki have a strained relationship. It's slightly hinted that this is because Natsuki is unhappy that his father is falling in love with another woman.
Sakura Usami (宇佐美 さくら, Usami Sakura)
Voiced by: Yui Ogura (Japanese); Nancy Novotny (English)
Natsuki's little sister, whom Natsuki is very fond of.
Erika Usami (宇佐美 えり香, Usami Erika)
Voiced by: Nozomi Yamamoto (Japanese); Genevieve Simmons (English)
She's in the same class as four main characters and sits next to Yuki. In episode 6 it is revealed that she is the granddaughter of the town's mayor. She is also related to the Usami family.
Urara (ウララ)
Voiced by: Takahiro Sakurai (Japanese); Blake Shepard (English)
An alien, the same type as Haru and his sister. He has long blue and pink hair. Referred as the JFX, the one who was possessing people. The main cause of the alien problem. He is quite shy.

== Broadcast ==
The anime began airing on the noitamina block on Fuji TV on April 12, 2012, and ended on June 28, 2012. The anime's opening theme was "Tsurezure Monochrome" by Fujifabric, while the ending theme was "Sora mo Toberu Hazu" by sayonara ponytail. Aniplex released the series on DVD/Blu-ray in six volumes from June 27, 2012, to November 11, 2012. Section23 Films released the entire series on Blu-ray and DVD on August 20, 2013.

== Episodes ==
No.	Title	Original air date
1	"Panicked Fishing" "Tenpatte Fisshingu" (テンパってフィッシング)	April 13, 2012
A new kid, an alien, and a fishing prince. Three unlikely friends brought together in an unusual place.
2	"The Frustrating Uni Knot" "Kuyashikute Yuni Notto" (悔しくてユニノット)	April 20, 2012
Haru, Yuki, and Natsuki just can't seem to see eye to eye on anything.
3	"Lonely Casting" "Samishikute Kyasutingu" (寂しくてキャスティング)	April 27, 2012
In order to fish in the ocean, both Haru and Yuki must learn the 'Enoshima Bowl' technique. Keito heads to the hospital for a checkup, and a worried Yuki locks himself in his room.
4	"Angry Landing" "Muka Tsuite Randingu" (ムカついてランディング)	May 4, 2012
Haru, Yuki, and Natuski have begun growing more familiar with each other as each day of fishing passes. Things seem to be running smoothly until a certain someone uses a water gun after promising not to.
5	"Discouraged Jerking" "Hekotarete Jākingu" (へこたれてジャーキング)	May 11, 2012
The fishing lessons have progressed, and summer is on the way. Yuki decides that it is the right time to get his own fishing pole, but what he wants isn't going to happen with the money he has. He, along with Haru and Natsuki, gets a job on a fishing boat.
6	"Horrified Splash" "Senritsu no Supurasshu" (戦慄のスプラッシュ)	May 18, 2012
Upon Keito's release from the hospital, Yuki wants to surprise her with a fresh tuna. The boys journey to a forbidden area of ocean in quest of Keito's favorite fish. Yuki catches a tuna there, but strange things begin occurring, including Haru's behavior.
7	"Painful Countdown" "Setsunakute Kauntodaun" (切なくてカウントダウン)	May 25, 2012
Yuki acquires his own equipment, and his love for fishing grows; meanwhile, Haru develops a disdain for the sport, and Natsuki's birthday approaches.
8	"Joyous Fighting" "Ureshikute Faitingu" (嬉しくてファイティング)	June 1, 2012
Koko and Haru are confronted with the question of why they are here, and the search for Sakura continues.
9	"Striking Underwater" "Shougeki no Andāwōtā" (衝撃のアンダーウォーター)	June 8, 2012
Martial law is declared in Enoshima, and Haru and JFX are being hunted. After Koko's failed attempt to stop JFX, Haru takes matters into his own hands and becomes a hero.
10	"Our Tackle" "Oretachi no Takkuru" (俺たちのタックル)	June 15, 2012
Despite the overwhelming apprehension everyone is experiencing, Yuki heads back to Enoshima. When JFX becomes military commander, everyone's worst fears are realized.
11	"Legend of the Big Fish" "Densetsu no Biggu Fisshu" (伝説のビッグフィッシュ)	June 22, 2012
Duck loses its fleet and its last resort is to launch missiles. While Yuki tries to convince them to do no such thing, he and his friends must also fish for their lives!
12	"Goodbye Fishing" "Sayonara no Fishing" (さよならのフィッシング)	June 28, 2012
The legendary lure is finally found. The race is on to stop Duck from firing the missiles.
