= Barakamon =

Japanese media franchise

- First tankōbon volume, featuring Seishu Handa (top) and Naru Kotoishi (bottom)

ばらかもん
- Genre: Comedy, slice of life
- Manga
- Written by: Satsuki Yoshino
- Published by: Square Enix
- English publisher: NA: Yen Press
- Imprint: Gangan Comics Online
- Magazine: Gangan Powered (2008–09); Gangan Online (2009–19); Monthly Shōnen Gangan (2014–18, 2023)
- Original run: February 22, 2008 – September 12, 2023
- Volumes: 19
- Manga

Handa-kun
- Written by: Satsuki Yoshino
- Published by: Square Enix
- English publisher: NA: Yen Press
- Magazine: Monthly Shōnen Gangan
- Original run: October 12, 2013 – September 12, 2016
- Volumes: 7
- Anime television series
- Directed by: Masaki Tachibana
- Written by: Pierre Sugiura
- Music by: Kenji Kawai
- Studio: Kinema Citrus
- Licensed by: NA: Funimation; UK: Anime Limited
- Original network: Nippon TV, NIB, HTV, STV, CTV, MMT, FBS, BS NTV, Sun TV
- Original run: July 6, 2014 – September 27, 2014
- Episodes: 12
- Anime television series

Handa-kun
- Directed by: Yoshitaka Koyama
- Written by: Michiko Yokote; Mariko Kunisawa; Miharu Hirami
- Music by: Ken Itō
- Studio: Diomedéa
- Licensed by: AUS: Hanabee; NA: Funimation
- Original network: TBS, MBS, CBC TV, BS-TBS, TBS Channel 1
- English network: SEA: Animax Asia
- Original run: July 8, 2016 – September 23, 2016
- Episodes: 12
- Television drama
- Directed by: Keita Kono
- Produced by: Masataka Takamaru
- Written by: Kumiko Asō
- Studio: Fuji Television
- Original network: FNS (Fuji TV)
- Original run: July 12, 2023 – September 20, 2023
- Episodes: 11
- icon

Barakamon (ばらかもん) is a Japanese manga series written and illustrated by Satsuki Yoshino. The story follows Seishu Handa, a calligrapher who moves to the remote Gotō Islands off the western coast of Kyūshū, and his various interactions with the people of the island. The manga started with three one-shots published in Square Enix's Gangan Powered magazine from February 2008 to February 2009, and began serialization on the Gangan Online website on the same month; it was also serialized in parallel in the Monthly Shōnen Gangan magazine from July 2014 and finished in December 2018; it resumed for a limited time in the magazine from April to September 2023. Its chapters were collected in 19 tankōbon volumes.

A 12-episode anime television series adaptation, produced by Kinema Citrus, aired from July to September 2014. An 11-episode television drama adaptation by Kyodo Television aired from July to September 2023. A spin-off manga series, titled Handa-kun, was serialized in Monthly Shōnen Gangan from October 2013 to September 2016. The spin-off received 12-episode anime television series adaptation by Diomedéa, aired from July to September 2016.

In North America, both the original manga and the spin-off have been licensed by Yen Press. The anime adaptations of both works have been licensed by Funimation (later Crunchyroll).

== Plot ==
Seishu Handa is a professional calligrapher, despite his young age. When the elderly curator of an exhibition criticizes his calligraphy for being too unoriginal ("like a textbook"), Seishu gets angry and punches him. Because of this, his father sends him off for a retreat on Goto Island, near Kyushu. There, he meets the colorful villagers, interacts with them, and begins to find his own style.

The title of the series means "energetic/cheerful one" in the local provincial Goto Islands' dialect. The first episode is also called "Barakakodon/ばらかこどん" which means "energetic/cheerful kid", which refers to Naru Kotoishi, a very hyperactive kid that comes into Handa's life.

The prequel spin-off Handa-kun is about Seishu Handa's high school days, six years prior to the events of Barakamon.

== Characters ==
=== Main characters ===
Seishu Handa (半田 清舟, Handa Seishu)
Voiced by: Daisuke Ono (Japanese, adult); Nobunaga Shimazaki (Japanese, young); Robert McCollum (English)
Portrayed by: Yosuke Sugino
Handa is a 23-year-old master calligrapher who dedicates his life to the art. His real name is Sei (清). After punching a gallery curator for calling his calligraphy "boring," "rigid," "academic," and "bland", he is sent by his father to a small town in the Goto Islands to focus on his calligraphy as he waits out his "banishment". He is typically childish and a short-tempered adult. He's also easy to scare. He's affectionately called "Sensei" (先生) by the people of the village area of town. As a teenager, he was equally popular among the boys and girls from his school but was under the impression that most of the school hated him when in fact, he was worshipped by others who misunderstood his methods from interactions with him. He eventually discovers the truth of his reputation and was dismayed to hear his best friend was teasing him the whole time. While Handa came to understand that, he was overwhelmed by the popularity.
Naru Kotoishi (琴石 なる, Kotoishi Naru)
Voiced by: Suzuko Hara (Japanese); Alison Viktorin (English)
Portrayed by: Ririsa Miyazaki
Naru is a 7-year-old (6-year-old in the beginning) girl in her first year at a local elementary; she lives on the Gotō Islands alone with her grandfather. Her personality is very energetic, curious, and childish. She visits Handa's house every day to play. She is typically reckless, thinking after she acts; this is shown by all the time she disobeys Handa.

=== Supporting characters ===
Miwa Yamamura (山村 美和, Yamamura Miwa)
Voiced by: Nozomi Furuki (Japanese); Lynsey Hale (English)
Portrayed by: Hana Toyoshima
A 14-year-old middle school student with a bit of a boyish personality who is friends with Tamako and Naru. Naru learned many weird things from emulating her (mainly things she shouldn't know), for which Seishu scolded her. She created five copies of the key to Seishu's house back when it was the kids' base, one of which she lost in the hills behind his house.
Tamako Arai (新井 珠子, Arai Tamako)
Voiced by: Rumi Okubo (Japanese); Apphia Yu (English)
Portrayed by: Hana Kondō
A 14-year-old middle school student. She has been a lover of manga since childhood and recently began aiming to be a manga artist. She has been struggling with her repressed yaoi interests ever since Handa moved in. She also owns one of the keys to Seishu's house.
Hiroshi Kido (木戸 浩志, Kido Hiroshi)
Voiced by: Koki Uchiyama (Japanese); Clifford Chapin (English)
Portrayed by: Keito Tsuna
Son of the village chief. He is a high school student who hates how he is average in everything, such as looks, grades, sports, and activities. He delivers meals to Handa's home and sometimes cooks for him. He likes to fish, and aims for the hisanio, or the striped beakfish, when fishing with others. He also owns one of the keys to Seishu's house.
Hina Kubota (久保田 陽菜, Kubota Hina)
Voiced by: Rina Endō (Japanese); Lara Woodhull (English)
She is a child from the island, and Naru's best friend. She is very shy and quick to cry, especially when dealing with strangers or whenever she's really happy. When she first met Handa, she quickly started crying.
Kentaro Ohama (大浜 謙太郎, Ōhama Kentarō)
Voiced by: Seiya Kimura (Japanese); Leah Clark (English)
A boy with a buzzcut and friend of Naru. He is just like Naru: a really energetic kid. He loves to hunt for beetles and other insects. The first time he meets Seishu, he gives him a butt jab.
Akihiko Arai (新井 明彦, Arai Akihiko)
Voiced by: Megumi Han (Japanese); Morgan Berry (English)
Tamako's responsible younger brother. He loves gaming, and frequently watches his grandmother's store for her.
Yūjirō Kido (木戸 裕次郎 (郷長), Kido Yūjirō (Gōchō))
Voiced by: Tanuki Sugino (Japanese); R. Bruce Elliott (English)
Portrayed by: Kazuki Iio
The village chief and Hiroshi's father. He is laid back and brings Seishu medicine and food.
Kazuyuki Sakamoto (坂本 一行, Sakamoto Kazuyuki)
Voiced by: Fumihiko Tachiki (Japanese); Christopher Sabat (English)
The vice-principal of Naru's school, who Seishu says doesn't look like a teacher. He has a habit of smoking and enjoys fishing in the village's pond.
Takao Kawafuji (川藤 鷹生, Kawafuji Takao)
Voiced by: Junichi Suwabe (adult); Kazuyuki Okitsu (young) (Japanese); Duncan Brannan (English)
Seishu's art dealer, and friend since middle school. He arranges Handa's calligraphy work and other needs. He says that he prioritizes Handa for his skills as a money maker, but actually cares deeply for him. He is responsible for Handa's extreme anxiety as a high schooler when he jokingly told him their senior hated him.
Kosuke Kanzaki (神崎 康介, Kanzaki Kōsuke)
Voiced by: Yuki Kaji (Japanese); Austin Tindle (English)
A high school calligrapher. He idolizes Seishu and started calligraphy professionally after seeing an exhibition of his. He got the first prize in a calligraphy competition in which Handa entered. He is generally polite, if a bit effete, and hates bugs.
Kosaku Kotoishi (琴石 耕作, Kotoishi Kōsaku)
Voiced by: Hiroshi Ito (Japanese); Bill Flynn (English)
Naru's grandfather. He gives Seishu a ride on his tractor both times Seishu came to the island. He is kind to Seishu but frequently asks favors of him.
Iwao Yamamura (山村 巌, Yamamura Iwao)
Voiced by: Atsushi Ono (Japanese); Greg Dulcie (English)
Miwa's father. He is an eccentric and intimidating man, who Seishu thinks resembles a Yakuza.
Seimei Handa (半田 清明, Handa Seimei)
Voiced by: Kosuke Meguro (Japanese); Mark Stoddard (English)
Portrayed by: Kenichi Endō
Seishu's father. He is a man of few words and a little awkward. He was the one to send Seishu to the island, and also lived there when he was around his son's age.
Emi Handa (半田 えみ, Handa Emi)
Voiced by: Yoshino Takamori; Natsuko Kuwatani (Handa-kun) (Japanese); Cynthia Cranz (English)
Seishu's mother. She was against him going to the island, and tries to convince him not to go back, believing his time on the island turned him into a strange person. Despite her appearances, she is actually rather outspoken and short-tempered.

=== Handa-kun ===
Junichi Aizawa (相沢 順一, Aizawa Jun'ichi)
Voiced by: Yuya Hirose (Japanese); Micah Solusod (English)
Leader of the Handa Club, he initially hated Handa when he thought Handa was trying to take the job of class rep away from him. When Handa turns the job down, Aizawa claims that Handa did so because he cares deeply for the feelings of others. Aizawa then relinquishes the job of class rep to Handa, while taking the vice class rep position himself resolving to do Handa's job anyway.
Reo Nikaido (二階堂 レオ, Nikaidō Reo)
Voiced by: Tetsuya Kakihara (Japanese); Chris Burnett (English)
An attractive and popular student who was jealous of Handa for stealing his fans and popularity. When Handa shows him kindness (while mistaking him for a homeless person), he gave up his modeling job to be closer to Handa and joins the Handa Club.
Akane Tsutsui (筒井 あかね, Tsutsui Akane)
Voiced by: Yoshimasa Hosoya (Japanese); Alejandro Saab (English)
A large rather thuggish brute who was formerly an androgynous boy that was often picked on before he became a truant, to get stronger and succeeded. He stayed at home until he was visited by Handa and the latter unintentionally saved him from a group of thugs. Grateful, Tsutsui decided to go back to school and dedicate himself to being Handa's bodyguard and get him to notice him. He becomes a member of the Handa Club and of the four members, he is the one who believes Handa is a strong guy.
Yukio Kondo (近藤 幸男, Kondō Yukio)
Voiced by: Daiki Yamashita (Japanese); Dallas Reid (English)
A second year student, he is an average young man. He is a member of the Handa Club and of the four members, he is the only normal member as he is more rational minded than the others. Because of this, Kondo is the only one who can properly understand Handa's thoughts while the others often pick on him. Due to his personality, he is the only one that Handa is comfortable with though believes him to be harassing him.
Kei Hanada (花田 慶, Hanada Kei)
Voiced by: Yusuke Shirai (Japanese); Anthony Bowling (English)
Hanada is a young man that is physically identical to Handa in almost every way aside from his overbite which he keeps hidden under mask. He pretends to be Handa often.
Miyoko Kinjo (金城 美代子, Kinjō Miyoko)
Voiced by: Kaede Hondo (Japanese); Jad Saxton (English)
She is a classmate of Handa. Initially, a normal quiet girl who had feelings for Handa. These feelings turn into an obsession after he shows her kindness and she becomes a stalker of his. She is nicknamed the "Eraser" both for how her peers disappear and how Handa returned her eraser.
Maiko Mori (森 麻衣子, Mori Maiko)
Voiced by: Miku Itō (Japanese); Sarah Wiedenheft (English)
Maiko is a girl with pink hair in twin-tails. She has a crush on Handa and gives him a love letter, though he takes it as a letter of challenge. She has a way of giving back-handed comments about her best friend, Juri.
Sawako Tennoji (天王寺 佐和子, Tennōji Sawako)
Voiced by: Yū Kobayashi (Japanese); Trina Nishimura (English)
Kotaro Higashino (東野 光太郎, Higashino Kōtarō)
Voiced by: Makoto Furukawa (Japanese); Ricco Fajardo (English)
Juri (ジュリ, Juri)
Voiced by: Kimiko Saito (Japanese); Terri Doty (English)
Juri is a girl with an oversized head. She seems to have a crush on Handa though she denies it. Maiko is her best friend, though Juri questions why she is friends with her as Maiko often makes insulting comments about her.
Kasumi Hiroyama (比良霞, Hiroyama Kasumi)
Voiced by: Rie Kugimiya (Japanese); Tia Ballard (English)
Asahi Ichimiya (一宮 旭, Ichinomiya Asahi)
Voiced by: Kenichi Suzumura (Japanese); Chris Patton (English)
Soichi Nagamasa (長政 壮一, Nagamasa Sōichi)
Voiced by: Daisuke Hirakawa (Japanese); David Trosko (English)
Sosuke Kojika (小鹿 宗介, Kojika Sōsuke)
Voiced by: Shōta Aoi (Japanese); Jessie James Grelle (English)
Tsukasa Komichi (小路 司, Shouji Tsukasa)
Voiced by: Toshiki Masuda (Japanese); Todd Haberkorn (English)
Tomohiro Shiromoto (条本 友弘, Shiromoto Tomohiro)
Voiced by: Wataru Hatano

== Media ==
=== Manga ===
Written and illustrated by Satsuki Yoshino, Barakamon started as a one-shot in Square Enix's Gangan Powered on February 22, 2008. (Note: Published in the magazine's April 2008 issue, released on February 22 of that same year.) Two other chapters appeared in the magazine, with the third one released on February 21, 2009; the manga continued as a serial on the Gangan Online website from the same day. Starting on July 11, 2014, the manga was published in parallel in Monthly Shōnen Gangan. The series finished in Monthly Shōnen Gangan on December 12, 2018, and on Gangan Online on January 10, 2019. Square Enix collected its chapters in 18 tankōbon volumes, released from July 22, 2009, to December 12, 2018. The series resumed limited serialization in Monthly Shōnen Gangan from April 12 to September 12, 2023. A 19th volume was published on July 12, 2023.

In North America, the manga was licensed for English release by Yen Press. The first eighteen volumes were released from October 28, 2014, to August 20, 2019.

A spin-off/prequel manga, titled Handa-kun (はんだくん), also written and illustrated by Yoshino, was serialized in Monthly Shōnen Gangan from October 12, 2013, to September 12, 2016. It focuses on Seishu's life as a high school student, six years prior to the events of Barakamon. Square Enix collected its chapters in seven tankōbon volumes, released from June 21, 2014, to September 12, 2016. Yen Press licensed the manga (first in digital and later in print), and published the seven volumes in print from February 23, 2016, to September 19, 2017.

=== Anime ===
An anime adaptation by the studio, Kinema Citrus, began airing on July 5, 2014. Funimation has licensed the series for streaming and home video release, and Crunchyroll streamed it. The opening theme song is "Rashisa" (らしさ) performed by Super Beaver, and the ending theme is "Innocence" by NoisyCell.

An anime television adaptation of the Handa-kun spin-off manga was announced on Square Enix's Gangan Online website on February 1, 2016. It began airing on July 7, 2016, on TBS and CBC, and later began airing on MBS, BS-TBS, and TBS Channel 1. The 12-episode series was directed by Yoshitaka Koyama and produced by Diomedéa. Michiko Yokote, Mariko Kunisawa, and Miharu Hirami wrote the series' scripts, while Mayuko Matsumoto designed the characters and Kenji Kawai composed the music. The opening theme song, titled "The LiBERTY", was performed by Fo'xTails, and the ending theme song, titled "HIDE-AND-SEEK", was performed by Kenichi Suzumura. Funimation has also licensed the series for streaming and home video release and plans a broadcast dub for the series.

==== Barakamon episodes ====
No.	Title	Original release date
1	"Troublesome Kid" "Barakakodon /Genkina Kodomo" (Japanese: ばらかこどん /元気な子供)	July 6, 2014
After punching the elderly curator of the exhibition for insulting his calligraphy, Seishu Handa is sent to a village on an island near Kyushu, where he plans to improve his craft. Seishu has trouble dealing with the culture shock compared to his Tokyo upbringing: the people speak with strange accents, the house has decades-old technology, and a little girl, Naru, continuously pesters him. That evening, Seishu meets the villagers as they help him move in the rest of his belongings.
2	"Annoying" "Yakamashika /Urusai" (Japanese: やかましか /うるさい)	July 13, 2014
Seishu meets Naru's friends, middle-school students Miwa and Tamako. The village chief's son, Hiroshi, brings Seishu his mother's cooking and finds that Seishu has worked himself near death. Naru shows Hiroshi the effort Seishu puts into his work, inspiring Hiroshi. The next day, Naru finds Seishu collapsed from exhaustion, and he is rushed to the hospital, where everyone visits him. Seishu meets an elderly patient, but when he is discharged, he is told that he was the only patient there, making the others wonder if he saw a ghost.
3	"Mochi Thrown in Celebration" "Hitonmochi /Oiwai de nagerareru Mochi" (Japanese: ひとんもち /お祝いで投げられる餅)	July 20, 2014
Seishu meets Tamako at the general store, learning that she wrote a manga she wants to submit to a shounen magazine, though he finds that her draft is exceedingly violent. The next day, Seishu receives word that his calligraphy contest entry placed second behind the work of a younger entrant, leaving him depressed. In an attempt to cheer him up, Naru drags him to a mochi-catching contest. When Seishu is unable to catch any, an old woman advises him to wait for the opportunities in front of him instead of fighting others.
4	"Island Dads" "Shiman ontsandon /Shima no Oyajitachi" (Japanese: しまんおんつぁんどん /島の親父たち)	July 27, 2014
Seishu finds that his computer and cellphone have stopped working, so he goes to the general store to make a call. The general store's phone ends up being an old rotary phone, which Tamako's younger brother Akki has to help him use, embarrassing him. Miwa's father has Seishu paint a long phrase in kanji on his new boat as its name. Seishu panics at messing up, but after the kids put hand-prints on the hull, he finds that he can indeed write on the boat.
5	"Going Swimming at the Beach" "Un ni oegii /Umi ni oyogi ni iku" (Japanese: うんにおえぎいっ /海に泳ぎに行く)	August 3, 2014
When Miwa and Tamako ask for help with their writing homework, Seishu impresses upon them his own calligraphy training. He accompanies the children on their beach trip and tries to take care of them, but being inexperienced, keeps slipping on the slick rocky shore. On the way back, he mutters that he was worried about the group's safety. The children embrace him in response, promising not to worry him anymore. Seishu's agent arrives at the island with a younger calligrapher in tow.
6	"Guys from Tokyo" "Yosonmon /Toukyou kara kita Yatsura" (Japanese: よそんもん /東京から来た奴ら)	August 10, 2014
Seishu's agent and only friend Takao shows up drunk with prodigal calligrapher Kosuke. Upon realizing that Kosuke is the younger calligrapher who beat Seishu in the previous contest, Miwa and Hiroshi try to get him to leave. Seishu tells them that he knew who Kosuke was, but has moved on. Kosuke tells Seishu how much he idolizes him and begs him to return to Tokyo, saying that Seishu's art has gone downhill since he came to the island. Seishu has a breakdown, feeling stuck between writing for a prize and writing for himself. When he sees Naru and Hina, he reiterates his decision to stay.
7	"A High-Grade Fish" "Hisan-Iwo /Koukyuuna Sakana" (Japanese: ひさんいを /高級な魚)	August 17, 2014
The group takes Kawafuji and Kosuke fishing. When Hiroshi gives his fishing rod to Kosuke, a large fish catches the bait and the group helps Kosuke reel it in. They joyfully identify the fish as the hisanio fish Hiroshi was pursuing. Just then, the fish falls back into the water, leaving the group in fits of laughter. The next day, Kosuke and Kawafuji leave the island and the group comes to see them off.
8	"Buddhist Chanting Dance" "Onde /Nenbutsu Odori" (Japanese: オンデ /念仏踊り)	August 24, 2014
The gang decides to hold a surprise birthday party for Naru. Seishu unsuccessfully tries to catch a beetle to gift her and then loses the beetle one of the village children, Kentarou, gives him when it bites his hand. Eventually, Seishu gifts Naru an "I'll do anything you say" ticket. The next day, Naru and Seishu go to the graveyard for the Bon Festival, where Seishu realizes that despite Naru's cheerful nature, she must get lonely, and decides to give her as much time as he can while he is there.
9	"Was Almost Seriously Injured" "Okega Makucchishita /Ookega shisouni natta" (Japanese: おけがまくっちした /大怪我しそうになった)	September 6, 2014
Seishu has no idea what to write for the Naruka Institute Contest. Wanting to refresh himself with a hot bath, he discovers that his bath boiler is broken. He warms the bath with a fire but Miwa and Tamako mess around with it, angering him. Seishu and Hiroshi find kids from another village bullying Naru's group, and all get into a childish fight. The next day, Seishu goes into the mountains with the kids and falls off a cliff. Thinking he is going to die, he sees a shooting star and makes a wish to be saved, just before the group finds him.
10	"Let's All Go Together" "Dacchi Ikode/ Minna de ikou" (Japanese: だっちいこで /みんなで行こう)	September 13, 2014
Seishu finally finishes his work for the Naruka Institute exhibit - it says Stars, inspired by the starry night sky he had seen. The director decides that Seishu should return home. On the phone with Kawafuji, Seishu says, "I'll return." The next day, he attends the local festival with the group, where he enjoys himself greatly, having never attended a festival before due to his calligraphy career. Unable to tell the group, Seishu leaves the island the next morning without informing anyone.
11	"I Am in Tokyo" "Toukyou ni imasu/ Yoseo" (Japanese: 東京にいます /よせおっ)	September 20, 2014
Seishu returns to Tokyo and becomes worried about his new work since it is not really his style. He apologizes to the director for punching him, and is forgiven, as the director believes Seishu has matured. In a state of panic, Seishu blurts that his work isn't his official entry for the contest. As a result, he has to write something new and sinks into despair. The gang back on the island calls him, and Naru tells him to return home - the island. This inspires Seishu to create another work, which he names "The Stone Wall".
12	"Glad That You're Back" "Kaette Kite Urishika" (Japanese: かえってきてうりしか)	September 27, 2014
Seishu's mother is against him going back to the island, believing it to be a bad influence. Seishu learns that Miwa and Tamako have won awards for their calligraphy work, and reflects that he should've been there to celebrate with them. Seeing how much he cares, his mother agrees to let him return. Back at the island, the gang surprises him. Seishu receives word that he got 5th place in the contest but he is pleased, since it was a work he could be proud of. He tells Naru that right now, the group is what is most important to him. It is revealed that "The Stone Wall" had been a work displaying all of the group's names, with Naru's name being the largest.

==== Handa-kun episodes ====
No.	Title (Note: All English titles are taken from Funimation.)	Original release date (Note: TBS listed the series' premiere date on July 7 at 25:58, which is effectively July 8 at 1.58 a.m. JST.)
1	"Handa-kun and a Girl's Friendship" "Handa-kun to Onna no Yūjō" (Japanese: 半田くんと女の友情)	July 8, 2016
2	"Handa-kun and the Continuation of Episode 1" "Handa-kun and the Chairman" "Handa-kun and the Model"	July 15, 2016
3	"Handa-kun and the Truant" "Handa-kun and Cooking Class" "Handa-kun and His Friend"	July 22, 2016
4	"Handa-kun and Handa-kun?" "Handa-kun and a Girl's Jealousy" "Handa-kun and Sociability"	July 29, 2016
5	"Handa-kun and the Student Council" "Handa-kun and Memory Loss"	August 5, 2016
6	"Handa-kun and His Friend's Friend" "Handa-kun and Dash Higashino" "Handa-kun and Palmistry"	August 12, 2016
7	"Handa-kun and the Supplementary Exam" "Handa-kun and the Library"	August 19, 2016
8	"Handa-kun and the School Excursion" "Handa-kun to Shūgakuryokō" (Japanese: 半田くんと修学旅行)	August 26, 2016
9	"Handa-kun and the Frog" "Handa-kun and the Stalker"	September 2, 2016
10	"Handa-kun and the Normal Guy" "Handa-kun and the Bishoujo"	September 9, 2016
11	"Handa-kun and the School Festival Preparations" "Handa-kun to Bunkasai Junbi" (Japanese: 半田くんと文化祭準備)	September 16, 2016
12	"Handa-kun and the Cultural Festival" "Handa-kun to Bunkasai" (Japanese: 半田くんと文化祭)	September 23, 2016

=== Drama ===
In April 2023, a television drama adaptation, produced by Kyodo Television, was announced. The series is directed by Keita Kono, with Masataka Takamaru serving as producer, Kumiko Asō handling the screenplay and Juichi Uehara in charge of planning. It was aired from July 12 to September 20, 2023, on Fuji TV. Perfume performed their 28th single titled "Moon" as the theme song.

==== Episodes ====
No.	Title	Directed by	Written by	Original release date
0	"Pilot episode"	Unknown	Unknown	July 5, 2023
1	"To the Goto Islands! Unexpected exile on the island" (Japanese: 五島列島へ！まさかの島流し編)	Keita Kono	Kumiko Aso	July 12, 2023
2	"A new life on the island has many challenges ahead!? Torrential rain causes troubles one after another" (Japanese: 島の新生活は前途多難 ! ? 豪雨襲来トラブル続出)	Keita Kono	Kumiko Aso	July 19, 2023
3	"Best friends and rivals come to the island! Popular series with 10 million copies" (Japanese: 親友とライバルが来島！シリーズ一千万部人気作)	Yasushi Ueda	Tatsuya Kanazawa	July 26, 2023
4	"New character appears! Troubles keep coming! Kiyoshu unexpectedly returns to Tokyo!?" (Japanese: 新キャラ登場！トラブル続々！清舟まさかの帰京 ! ?)	Yasushi Ueda	Tatsuya Kanazawa	August 2, 2023
5	"Kiyoshu is in a slump after returning to Tokyo!? His mother also appears, causing a stir" (Japanese: 清舟、帰京でスランプに ! ? 母も登場で大波乱)	Keita Kono	Kumiko Aso	August 9, 2023
6	"New chapter starts! Deliver it! Thoughts of gratitude! Tears sent to field" (Japanese: 新章スタート！ 届け！感謝の想い！涙の野辺送り)	Yasushi Ueda	Kumiko Aso	August 16, 2023
7	"My father and mother came to Goto! An unexpected showdown between parent and child!?" (Japanese: 父と母が五島にやって来た！まさかの親子対決 ! ?)	Takao Kinoshita	Tatsuya Kanazawa	August 23, 2023
8	"The mysterious man is Naru's father!? A stalker appears on her birthday!" (Japanese: 謎の男はなるの父親 ! ? 誕生日にストーカー出現！)	Shinichi Kitabo	Rie Uehara	August 30, 2023
9	"Kiyoshu, life choices! Going to Tokyo for the first time" (Japanese: 清舟、人生の選択！なる初めて東京に行く)	Keita Kono	Kumiko Aso	September 6, 2023
10	"Off to a new journey! What is the future for each?" (Japanese: 新たなる旅出ちへ！それぞれの未来は？)	Takao Kinoshita	Tatsuya Kanazawa	September 13, 2023
11	"Heartful Island Comedy finally final episode" (Japanese: ハートフル島コメディ、ついに最終回)	Yasushi Ueda	Kumiko Aso	September 20, 2023
