= Canute (Vinland Saga) =

Fictional character from Vinland Saga

- Vinland Saga character
- Canute, as drawn by Makoto Yukimura
- First appearance: Vinland Saga chapter 21: "Valhalla"
- Created by: Makoto Yukimura
- Voiced by: Japanese Kensho Ono; English Jessie James Grelle (Crunchyroll dub), Griffin Burns (Netflix dub)

Canute (Japanese: クヌート, Hepburn: Kunūto) is a character from the manga series Vinland Saga by Makoto Yukimura. Canute is the 17-year-old prince of the Danes. He is initially portrayed as timid and feminine, and he is unable to function without his retainer, Ragnar. These traits, along with his strong Christianity, earn him the mockery of the Vikings with whom he works. After Ragnar's death and the toll of experiencing warfare, however, he has a sharp reversal of personality, becomes strong, kingly, and openly hostile towards religion, and in his Messiah complex, develops an ambition to create utopia on Earth before God's return. Towards this end, he plots to overthrow his father Sweyn and brother Harald while also razing anything he deems unfit for, or resistant to, his paradise.

Canute is based on the historical King Canute the Great, the most prominent Danish ruler of England. Yukimura created him to be the foil of the protagonist Thorfinn, who also wishes for a utopia, but their ideals contradict each other. The character's design was also changed to fit the Western setting of the series from an androgynous style to a more masculine style. His voice actor in Japanese is Kensho Ono, while Jessie James Grelle voices him in the Crunchyroll dub and Griffin Burns in the Netflix dubs.

Critical response to Canute's character has been positive due to his early character arc from a scared man to a charismatic ruler, showing he has the power to overthrow his father as the next king. His characterization in the next story arc as the new ruler was the subject of positive responses as well as analysis of how Yukimura pays homage to the real Canute the Great in several scenes from the series.

== Creation ==
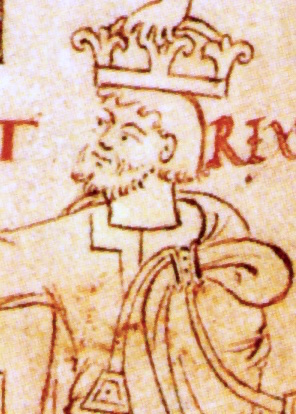
In order to fit with the Western setting like the original Canute, Yukimura redesigned his own original androgynous take for the second story arc.

Though based on the real figure of Cnut, manga author Makoto Yukimura said that Canute's personality was based on his interpretation of him, as he did not do research for his role on the historical figure when writing the Vinland Saga manga. Canute was created to be the foil of the series' protagonist, Thorfinn. While Thorfinn develops several values in the narrative based on the author himself, Yukimura wanted the reader to see that there is always somebody with a different idea.

Early in the series, Canute deeply cares about his caretaker Ragnar and is challenged about him following his death. Yukimura said, if people changed our point of view, it could be seen as discrimination, knowing that he treats people in a more special way than others. Should he know that his family was in danger, the author claimed he would do anything to defend them. On the other hand, "love" consists of treating everyone the same, then I don't think I feel it. I even think that if what we call love is only that, it's not an emotion really worthy of praise; "It's only when we shed our physical shells that we are complete and able to express love".

Canute's power in the second story arc was meant to emphasize how he is now the new cause behind the world Thorfinn experienced as a Viking and wants to escape as a result of the violence it caused. In their eventual reunion, Yukimura wants to contrast their viewpoints and how the protagonist decides to abandon any hope, like Canute, who has decided to seek his own way of living while Thorfinn instead escapes from him, searching his own hope.

Yukimura was often told by his editors not to draw Canute with a beard, as they claimed its interference with the bishonen archetype he represented would diminish the series' popularity. He rejected that idea, claiming that every man had a beard in that era. Conversely, Thorfinn becomes an adult in the second story arc, but he shaves his beard, as Yukimura did not want him to look strong.

=== Casting ===
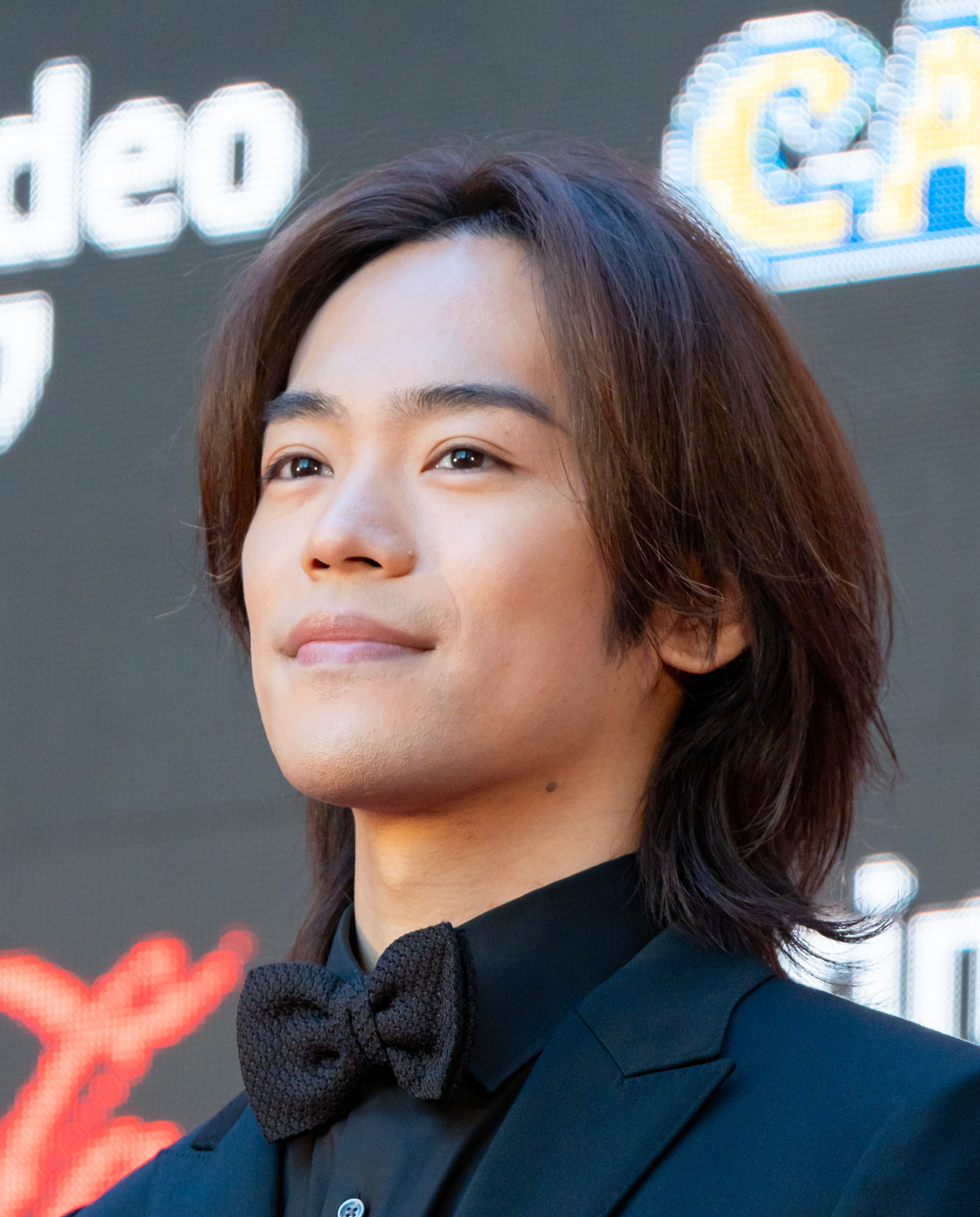
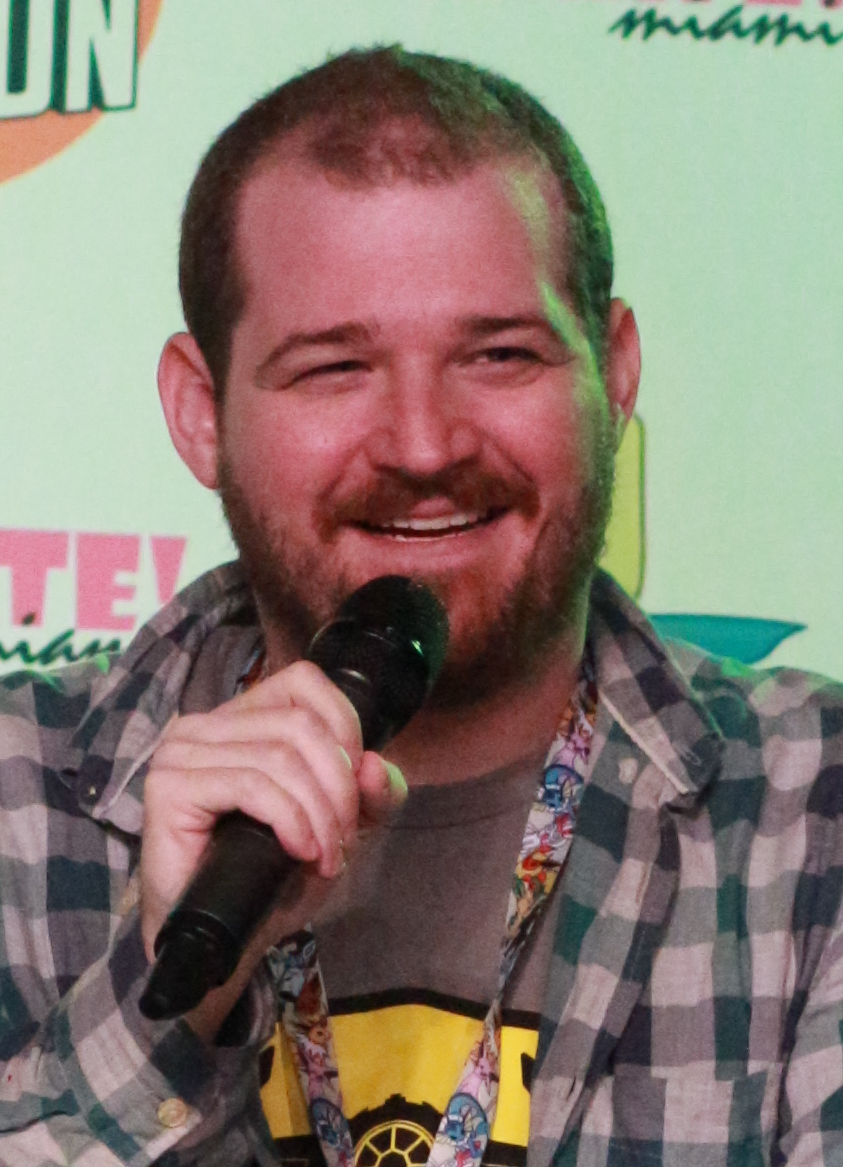
Kensho Ono voices Canute in Japanese, while Josh Grelle dubs him in the Crunchyroll localization.

Kensho Ono voices Canute in Japanese. His first impression was that he was bearish and contrasted with Thorfinn. However, following his caretaker's death then, Ono found that the character "wakes up" and becomes acting in a different manner. Recording this change of tone was something Ono often remembers worrying about what to do about it. While Thorfinn feels like a mean spirited teenager with a strong wild flavor, Canute is part of a royal family, timid, and of few words. The parallels between Canute and Thorfinn's characterizations impressed the voice actor. He especially liked when Canute becomes stressed for the first time in the anime series when interacting with the young Thorfinn.

Following Ragnar's death, the actor thought that Canute was a very worthwhile person. In his life, there is only a future where he will die if he continues to be timid. However, this incident made him realize that he must change the world. Ono was very impressed because he felt that way. He thought it would be better to calculate backwards and show the audience that he has changed completely when he wakes up. Ono approached with a posture that allows him to play in the most stable manner. The director said it was important to have a sense of nobility as a prince during recording of the series. Ono wanted his words and nuances to both show his pride and that he was different from ordinary people when portraying the character.

In the English dub of Vinland Saga, Canute is voiced by Jessie James Grelle in the Crunchyroll dub, while Griffin Burns portrays Canute in the Netflix dub. Grelle comically said he was used to voicing blonde characters in anime created by Wit Studio but still found his work enjoyable.

The stage play adaptations of the manga, feature Ryō Kitamura as Canute in the first story arc.

== Appearances ==
Canute is introduced in Vinland Saga as the 17-year-old prince of the Danes. He is initially portrayed as timid and womanly, and he is unable to function without his retainer, Ragnar. The Vikings led by Askeladd finds employment as mercenaries under Canute's father King Sweyn as his son was kidnapped by the mercenary Thorkell the Tall. Askeladd's group rescue the prince thanks to their soldier Thorfinn who becomes his bodyguard. Askeladd has Canute's caretaker, Ragnar, die in order to make the prince more independent. As Canute questions his love for Ragnar and whether or not he loved him, he has a sharp reversal of personality, becomes strong and kingly, and develops an ambition to create utopia on Earth before God's return. This new attitude allows him to stop the fights between Thorkell and Askeladd's forces and have them under his command. Towards this end of a utopia, Canute plots to overthrow his father, Sweyn Forkbeard, and take the crown of the Danes. Askeladd is ultimately forced to sacrifice himself by killing Sweyn during an audience when the king announces his plan to invade Wales, feigning madness. As Canute kills him, a confused Thorfinn tries to kill the Prince but is stopped by Thorkell. The Prince then takes over Dane-occupied England without question.

As time passes since Sweyn's death, King Canute marches ahead of his troops in the war against Ethelred II for the throne of England. He severely punishes some of his forward troops for pillaging and treating the English peasants badly. Canute then sets alight a series of massive pyres across the countryside to demonstrate his power. The death of other Royals lead Canute to be recognized as Bretwalda, King of England. However, the corrupted actions of the King result into Canute having visions in the form of the head of King Sweyn, who exposes Canute's hidden ambition and accuses him of poisoning his brother Harald so he can be king of Denmark and England.

Canute is faced with a shortage of revenue to fund his domains of Denmark and England and considers a plan to requisition farmland from wealthy landowners to fund the military. Canute prepares to march on Ketil, a Danish landowner from Denmark to take over his land with over 100 men, including the Jomsvikings. After his initial victory, the exiled Thorfinn who has been working as a slave for Ketil approaches Canute's camp to beg him to leave the land alone. Canute believes Thorfinn will follow Askeladd's path and kill him like he did with Sweyn years ago but denies his request. However, as Thorfinn realizes that he cannot convince Canute to alter his path, Canute is bemused by how the former Viking has become into a pacifist and decides to abandon the ways of his father. Canute alters his plan to forcefully seize farms. The King withdraws his troops from England, avoiding a potential uprising and earning the respect of the English nobles in the process.

== Reception ==
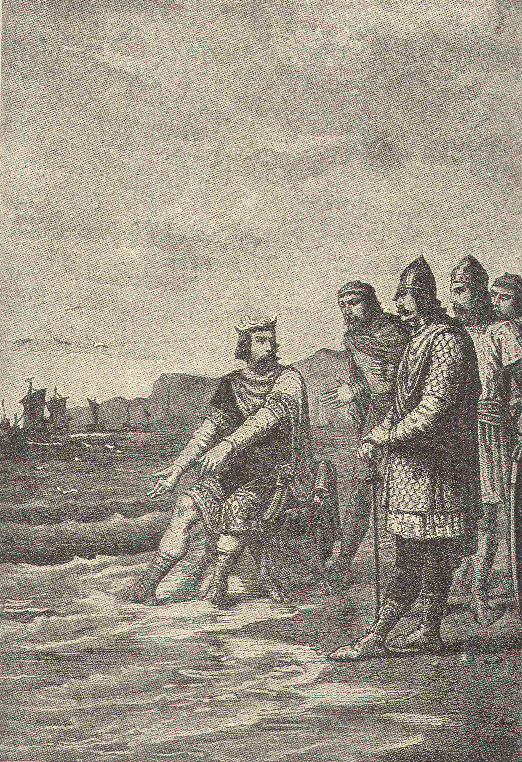
Canute's order to the tide is reinterpreted by Yukimura in the series' second story arc when the character confronts Thorfinn.

Critical response to the character has been positive. The Mary Sue praised Canute's role in the first story arc for schemes against the King and how the season finished with his killing of Askeladd, giving potential for a bigger role. Den of Geek saw that while Thorfinn is the protagonist in the series, he and Canute are under the eyes of Askeladd, who seems to care for their futures despite his violent actions. The Escapist Magazine commented the first arc of Vinland Saga heavily explored the concept of revenge and consequences throughout its characters Canute detesting his own father due to favouritism over his siblings. This causes a major impact in the young man due to his corrupted portrayal for his patricide quest. Screen Rant found Canute's storyline compelling due to how he changes from a confined prince to a corrupted person after learning the harsh realities of the world, to the point where he plots patricide alongside Askeladd's forces. The fact that this time Canute is fighting alone but has political power was noted by the website to make the second season more interesting to see played. But Why Tho said that while Thorkell's appearance in the second season was brief, he still had a powerful and ominous exchange with Canute that excited the reviewer to see him again in the next episodes. Geekmi was surprised by how different Canute was in the anime's second season upon first being revealed in terms of design, as he appeared to appeal to a different audience.

After the second story arc, Canute was absent from most of the next one. However, he makes brief returns in the final arc. This led to curiosity within the fandom in regard to the character dying in the final arc. However, whether or not the character would be killed in future events was kept unknown due to whether or not Yukimura would adapt the figure's death in the manga, as the real Canute died in 1035 as a natural death.

=== Psychology and analysis ===
In "The European Middle Ages through the Prism of Contemporary Japanese Literature: A Study of Vinland Saga, Spice & Wolf and l'Éclipse", Maxime Danesin claims Yukimura takes liberties with the portrayal of his characters, such as Canute in the first story arc, by giving him an androgynous and fragile look when interacting with Thorkell. Further exploring this subject, Yaledma Ayala Sepúlveda notes that the subject is a parallel to Thorfinn's own change of character. Canute defies the Christian God's love for humanity after the death of his caretaker. His transition from an androgynous man with long hair to a bearded man with short hair happens alongside his growth. This results into his growth as a man and eventual ruler, and while his faith is not as unwavering, he is still shown to be a Christian.

The transformation of Canute from a shy youth to a menacing man was done as a result of his father's death, who hunts him across the narrative in the form of hallucinations. Yukimura also takes far more liberties with Canute's characterization when re-enacting the tale of King Canute and the tide. In both events, the figure shows his lack of god-like power by ordering the sea. In Henry of Huntingdon's report, Cnut realizes his inferiority and accepts that God is above all, whereas Yukimura revitalizes this scene by giving it an antagonistic and tragic signification: a declaration of insurrection against God. The event went to be called the "final challenge to Cnut's image as a Christian king and crystallizes the peak of his philosophical and religious struggle throughout the manga." The writer further explains that across Vinland Saga, Yukimura pays both homage to the original Canute as well as his own take on the character by giving him such a role. Reviewing the anime adaptation, Anime News Network enjoyed this scene of Canute demanding the ocean to obey his godlike power, making the tide story interpreted in a clever fashion.
