= List of 7 Seeds characters =

The 7 Seeds manga series created by Yumi Tamura features a varied cast of diverse characters, each in different teams. There is no set main character. Instead, the story switches perspectives between each teams and different characters.

Every member of a team has a name containing a kigo, a poetic seasonal word, related to the team name – for example, all of the members of the Spring team have names traditionally associated with spring. Each team consists of seven members plus a guide trained in wilderness survival.

== Teams ==
There are currently five teams living in the world of 7 Seeds. Summer Team B, Spring Team, Winter Team, and Fall Team were placed in cryogenics around the same time. Summer Team A was placed 17 years before them, while Mozu was frozen a few years after Team A. Every team resurfaced at different times. The five teams are listed in order of appearance in the series, which is different from the order in which they were revived from cryonic preservation in the series' chronology.

=== Summer Team B ===
Summer Team B is created after the other four Japanese teams as a backup and consists of people who are healthy but rebellious or otherwise not well-adjusted to society. They emerge from cryonic preservation at the start of the series near an island in the East China Sea off the coast of Nagasaki Prefecture in western Kyūshū, and travel to the seed cache at the foot of Bungo Fuji in Ōita Prefecture.

Natsu Iwashimizu (岩清水 ナツ, Iwashimizu Natsu)
Voiced by: Yuka Nanri (drama CD), Nao Tōyama (anime) (Japanese); Jad Saxton (English)
A painfully shy, awkward and withdrawn 16-year-old girl. Natsu has difficulty expressing herself and was always put down at home and bullied in school. Nicknamed "Nacchan" by her friends and family She becomes essential to the team's survival by observing and writing down what they discover, such as which foods are edible. She has conflicting feelings for Arashi, knowing that he has a girlfriend. She is picked on or rather, teased by Semimaru frequently, in later chapters she grows close with Ango who helps her gain confidence in herself. Natsu means summer and iwashimizu means water trickling from rocks.
Arashi Aota (青田 嵐, Aota Arashi)
Voiced by: Kōsuke Toriumi (drama CD), Jun Fukuyama (anime) (Japanese); Alejandro Saab (English)
He is aged 17, brave and resourceful. He becomes close friends with Natsu and Semimaru and acts as Natsu's protector. He is generally depicted as a compassionate and considerate person. He is the boyfriend of Hana from the Spring Team and desperately tries to find her, hoping that she also survived. He was on the school swim team with Hana and is afraid of insects.
Semimaru Asai (麻井 蝉丸, Asai Semimaru)
Voiced by: Katsuyuki Konishi (drama CD, anime) (Japanese); Scott Gibbs (English)
A young man with a rebellious personality, aged 18. He is close friends with Natsu and Arashi, and is their teams cook. He enjoys picking on Natsu but actually cares about her and tries to cheer her up when she feels upset. It is revealed that he is interested in Natsu. He shows jealously whenever Ango keeps looking at Natsu. At first, he wants to punch Ango for making an advance on Natsu but cannot do so, as he knows Ango is stronger. He, similarly to Arashi is also afraid of insects
Matsuri Tendō (天道 まつり, Tendō Matsuri)
Voiced by: Ikumi Matsuno (drama CD), Kana Asumi (anime) (Japanese); Chaney Moore (English)
The daughter of a farmer, aged 16. She had been running away from home prior to being cryogenically frozen. She has a vibrant personality when compared to the rest of the Team Summer B, besides Semimaru. She is close friends with Natsu is shown to have romantic interest in Ryou from Team Summer A.
Chimaki Yamori (守宮 ちまき, Yamori Chimaki)
Voiced by: Miki (drama CD), Akira Ishida (anime) (Japanese); Clint Bickham (English)
An aloof art college student, aged 19. Chimaki loves painting and sculpting and has a habit of carving and drawing murals on rock walls.
Hotaru Kusakuri (草刈 螢, Kusakuri Hotaru)
Voiced by: Ai Tokunaga (drama CD), Aoi Yūki (anime); Caitlynn French (English)
A 12-year-old girl with a strong intuition, who always accurately predicts the weather and is shown to have some level of psychic capabilities. She is the cousin of Hibari Nigusa.
Kaname Mozunoto (百舌戸 要, Mozunoto Kaname)
Voiced by: Kazuhiko Inoue (drama CD, anime) (Japanese); David Wald (English)
A mysterious person of uncertain age (probably 37–38 years old), usually called just Mozu. He is very skilled at survival and stands out for having a name element, mozu (百舌; meaning butcher bird), that is a kigo of autumn instead of summer. In volume 6, when he meets Hana of Spring team while she is in despair, he offers to kill her. In volume 12, he tells Botan he is the nephew of the Prime Minister and a leader of the Seven Seeds project. A flashback reveals that he is responsible for the creation of the Seven Seeds program along with the selection of the members of Summer team A.
Botan Saotome (早乙女 牡丹, Saotome Botan)
Voiced by: Gara Takashima (drama CD), Yoko Somi (anime) (Japanese); Morgan Berry (English)
The guide for Summer team B. She used to be a policewoman and therefore skilled in self-defense. Very outspoken and straightforward in her communication.

=== Spring Team ===
The Spring Team emerges from cryonic preservation a few months after Summer Team B near an island off the coast of the Kantō region of central Honshu, and travel to Ogino Fuji in Kanagawa Prefecture, where they find a note from Natsu of Summer Team B. Later, Hana invites Takahiro, the surviving member of Winter Team, to join the Spring Team.

Hana Sugurono (末黒野 花, Sugurono Hana)
Voiced by: Satsuki Yukino (drama CD), Yōko Hikasa (anime) (Japanese); Amber Lee Connors (English)
The 17-year-old girlfriend of Arashi. She is depicted as beautiful, attractive and strong-willed; she is described as a tomboy by Arashi and energetic by Fujiko and Haru. Hana learns an adequate amount of wilderness survival skills from her father during her childhood. She was on her school swim team and dabbled in rock climbing as a hobby. When she realizes that she may never meet Arashi again, she contemplates suicide, but when she learns that Arashi has survived in Summer Team B she becomes determined to reunite with the love of her life.
Mansaku Tsunomata (角又 万作, Tsunomata Mansaku)
Voiced by: Ryōtarō Okiayu (drama CD, anime) (Japanese); Jay Hickman (English)
A young man with a strong body, aged 18. Mansaku is a skilled archer. He is depicted as laid-back person who enjoys meditation and Tang dynasty poetry.
Fujiko Amacha (甘茶 藤子, Amacha Fujiko)
Voiced by: Miho Yamada (drama CD), Shizuka Itō (anime) (Japanese); Elissa Cuellar (English)
A 17-year-old girl who aspires to become a doctor and an astronaut. She serves as an overseas medical volunteer before she is put in cryonic preservation. Fujiko gets along well with Hana.
Haru Yukima (雪間 ハル, Yukima Haru)
Voiced by: Sōichirō Hoshi (drama CD), Hirofumi Nojima (anime) (Japanese); Mike Haimoto (English)
A 16-year-old child-prodigy pianist, who can play other instruments such as the ocarina. He is depicted as intelligent but bratty, snobby and reserved. When he realizes the world he knew is gone, he tells Hana he is relieved to be rid of the pressures of winning competitions and performing flawlessly to please the public. He is attracted to Koruri and begins teaching her the joys of appreciating music.
Momotaro (Momota) Nobi (野火 桃太郎, Nobi Momotaro)
Voiced by: Yumiko Kobayashi (drama CD), Ryō Hirohashi (anime) (Japanese); Margarent McDonald (English)
A 12-year-old genius from Sendai who is called Momota by the others.
Chisa Taiami (鯛網 ちさ, Taiami Chisa)
Voiced by: Chiaki Ōsawa (drama CD), Mamiko Noto (anime) (Japanese); Lisa Villegas (English)
An 18-year-old woman from a prestigious family with strong political influence. She is a skilled potter. She is depicted as polite and obedient, using respectful language (see Honorific speech in Japanese), and is always drawn with her eyes mostly closed.
Hibari Nigusa (新草 ひばり, Niigusa Hibari)
Voiced by: Eri Kitamura (anime) (Japanese); Cat Thomas (English)
A 12-year-old girl who remains in a coma after being revived. She is the cousin of Hotaru Kusakuri and is cared for by Chisa.
Dosei Yanagi (柳 踏青, Yanagi Dōsei)
Voiced by: Taiten Kusunoki (drama CD), Hisao Egawa (anime) (Japanese); John Swasey (English)
The adult guide for the Spring Team. Before being put in cryonic preservation, Yanagi was a member of the Japan Self-Defense Forces. He is depicted as an arrogant disciplinarian and a misogynist. He dies saving the others by setting himself on fire after the giant praying mantis eggs that were laid inside his body hatched.

=== Winter Team ===
The Winter Team emerges from cryonic preservation in the Pacific Ocean off the southern coast of Hokkaidō about fifteen years before the start of the series. Three members die during the thawing process; on the way to the cache at Mt. Meakandake, they are attacked by a saber toothed tiger, killing their guide and Mutsuki. The remaining three, Mitsuru, Fubuki, and Takahiro, form a close relationship as they fight for survival.

Takahiro Aramaki (新巻 鷹弘, Aramaki Takahiro)
Voiced by: Nozomu Sasaki (anime) (Japanese); Justin Doran (English)
The main character of the chapters about Winter Team. Takahiro is a talented and famous high-school baseball player, described as the best pitcher to appear in 50 years, and plays in the Kōshien. He is attracted to Mitsuru, but when he realizes she is in love with Fubuki, he helps the two get together. After Fubuki and Mitsuru die, Takahiro survives on his own with two wolves named after them, which he raises from puppies, until he meets Arashi, Natsu and Semimaru of Summer Team B in the ruins of Tokyo. Later, he meets Hana of Spring Team, who invites him to join them.
Fubuki Samejima (鮫島 吹雪, Samejima Fubuki)
Voiced by: Kenji Nojima (anime) (Japanese); David Matranga (English)
Another talented and well-known high-school baseball player who, like Takahiro, plays at Kōshien. He is described as the shortstop of the century. He gets together with Mitsuru shortly before being killed by a tiger while saving Mitsuru and Takahiro.
Mitsuru Kagurazaka (神楽坂 美鶴, Kagurazaka Mitsuru)
Voiced by: Houko Kuwashima (anime) (Japanese); Sara Ragsdale (English)
A high-school student who studies traditional Japanese dance. She initially pretends to disdain Fubuki, but later admits to being a fan of both Fubuki and Takahiro from before being put in cryonically preservation. Unable to bear Fukubi's death, she dances in the snow and freezes to death.
Mutsuki Karezono (枯園 睦月, Karezono Mutsuki)
A first-year university student majoring in journalism. He jumps off a cliff after being mortally wounded by the tiger that kills Kumakawa.
Arare Fushizuke (柴漬 アラレ, Fushizuke Arare)
A winter team member who dies during the thawing process. In the data books, she is seen holding chemicals in one hand.
Fuka Ayatori (綾取 風花, Ayatori Fūka)
A winter team member who dies during the thawing process. In the data books, her picture shows her sewing clothes, suggesting she may be a designer.
Toji Murozaki (室咲 冬至, Murozaki Tōji)
A winter team member who dies during the thawing process. In the data books, he is seen picking apples from a tree and collecting them in a basket.
Sayuru Kumakawa (熊川 冴, Kumakawa Sayuru)
The guide for the Winter Team. He is killed by a sabertoothed tiger soon after being revived.

=== Fall Team ===
The Fall Team emerges from cryonic preservation about three years before the start of the series in the Sea of Japan off the coast of the Kansai region of western Honshu, and travel to Kobe Fuji in Hyogo Prefecture. They are led by Akio and Ran, who overthrew the Team guide Ryoya and keep the rest of the members enslaved with tasks such as raising corn, tending livestock and weaving fabric. Months after they meet Arashi, Natsu, and Semimaru from Summer Team B, the sky starts to rain ashes, which makes their hideout, field and everything they have built useless and unlivable. The Fall Team sets out to visit other Fuji and to find a safe place to live in.

Akiwo Haza (稲架 秋ヲ, Haza Akiwo)
Voiced by: Kenta Miyake (anime) (Japanese); Josh Morrison (English)
The leader of Fall Team, once a young but successful Internet businessman who studied in America and became fluent in English and Spanish. He and Ran dominate the rest of Fall Team, forcing them to work to quotas.
Ran Shishigaki (猪垣 蘭, Shishigaki Ran)
Voiced by: Mayumi Asano (anime) (Japanese); Oilvia Swasey (English)
An aggressive and selfish woman who used to work as an architect. She acts as Akio's enforcer and often practices English and Spanish with him so they do not forget their foreign language skills. She harbors a deep grudge against the organization that chose her to be a part of the Seven Seeds Project.
Hazuki Karita (刈田 葉月, Karita Hazuki)
Voiced by: Takanori Hoshino (anime) (Japanese); Jack Ivy (English)
A former Olympic competitor in judo.
Kurumi Shikano (鹿野 くるみ, Shikano Kurumi)
Voiced by: Ai Kakuma (anime) (Japanese); Maggie Flecknoe (English)
A kind, gentle woman who has experience staying in a farm in New Zealand. She falls in love with Ryuusei in the same team and eventually becomes pregnant with his child.
Ryusei Ogiwara (荻原 流星, Ogiwara Ryūsei)
Voiced by: Kaito Ishikawa (anime) (Japanese); Blake Shepard (English)
A young man who acts like a playboy.
Akane Nashimoto (梨本 茜, Nashimoto Akane)
Voiced by: Mikako Komatsu (anime) (Japanese); Melissa Molano (English)
A skilled diver, depicted as having a strong intuition about ghosts and spirits. She and Kurumi develop a close friendship.
Sakuya Yamaki (八巻 朔也, Yamaki Sakuya)
Voiced by: Daisuke Sakaguchi (anime) (Japanese); Bryson Baugus (English)
A former law student with eidetic memory. Yamaki literally means eighth volume and is another name for the Lotus Sutra.
Ryoya Izayoi (十六夜 良夜, Izayoi Ryōya)
Voiced by: Kenjiro Tsuda (anime) (Japanese); Greg Cote (English)
A former fireman and the irresolute guide for the Fall Team. When he meets Natsu, Arashi and Semimaru of Summer Team B, he attempts to poison them all but is prevented by Semimaru and Arashi. He is killed by Ango of Summer Team A in chapter 63, when he jumps to protect Ran.

=== Summer Team A ===
The members of Summer Team A were specially chosen for the Seven Seeds Project by the Japanese government. This project genetically engineered and conceived about 100 babies, born from carefully selected egg cells and sperms. Because of this, none of the members of Summer Team A have a family name. These babies are raised on an island and taught wilderness survival until they reach the age of 17. At that time, a last test is carried out to select the seven that are put in cryonic preservation.

"Failures" or dropouts from this project are said to have left the island to join the rest of society, but it is revealed that they are actually killed and disposed of. Each child is instructed in seven classes of technologies: water, fire, wind, earth, plant, animal, and medical, and at age 13, they choose two classes to specialize in. In the end, one survivor is selected to represent each class. They emerge from cryonic preservation in the Pacific Ocean off the coast of southern Kyūshū, a little later than Spring Team.

Ango (安吾)
Voiced by: Kenshō Ono (anime) (Japanese); Andrew Love, Luci Christian (child) (English)
A specialist in fire and water classes and the main character of the chapters about Summer Team A. He is the top student of the project and a rival of Ryou's. He and Ryou reluctantly respect each other. Ango was attracted to Ayu previously. He is close friends with Koruri, Mayu, Nobara, and Shigeru. Ango unconsciously sees Natsu as Shigeru because of their similar timid personalities and hard-working nature. He has now learned to be a bit more open, possibly due to the influence of Team Summer B.
Koruri (小瑠璃)
Voiced by: Haruka Chisuga (anime) (Japanese); Brittney Karbowski (English)
A specialist in wind and medical classes. She seems interested in Haru and enjoys listening to his music. She has naturally curly hair and is a good hang-glider.
Ryō (涼, Ryō)
Voiced by: Takahiro Sakurai (anime) (Japanese); Adam Gibbs, Avery Smithhart (child) (English)
A specialist in fire and water classes. Ryou is a top student and Ango's rival. He is depicted as rebellious with a cold demeanor, capable of evaluating situations dispassionately, but he shows glimpses of compassion at times. Though he may not seem like it on the surface, Ryou cares a lot about Ango, and seems to have developed a funny bond with Semimaru, where the latter refers to him as "Sensei" due to his extensive knowledge and survival skills. Ryou means cool.
Ayu (あゆ)
Voiced by: Yū Shimamura (anime) (Japanese); Patricia Duran (English)
Also known as Madonna for her beauty, Ayu is the best specialist in the plant class and also specializes in earth classes. She is sometimes bullied by other girls because they are jealous of her appearance and the attention she attracts from boys. She looks down on other human beings, frequently referring to them as idiots and filthy creatures. She now owns a small hyper black dog named "Kuroda" given by Aramaki, and is shown to be quite fond of him. Her interactions with Aramaki seem to have positive effects on her, as she is shown trying to understand Aramaki's views, and has no doubt developed an admiration for Aramaki. Ayu means sweetfish.
Gengoro (源五郎, Gengorō)
Voiced by: Takuya Sato (anime) (Japanese); Benjamin McLaughlin (English)
A specialist in animal and plant classes. Gengorou is depicted as a kind and mature person. He and Ango respect each other as peers.
Ban (鷭)
Voiced by: Takuma Terashima (anime) (Japanese); Gabriel Regojo (English)
A specialist in animal and medical classes. Ban is depicted as slow and socially awkward, but he is quick on his feet when treating an injured person.
Nijiko (虹子)
Voiced by: Junko Minagawa (anime) (Japanese); Carli Mosier (English)
A specialist in earth and water classes, Nijiko is depicted as always being calm and collected. She is with Ryou, but appears to not truly care for him. Aside from getting along decently with Ryo, Nijiko seems to grudgingly respect Ran.
Unami (卯浪)
Voiced by: Masashi Sugawara (anime) (Japanese); Kyle Jones (English)
The guide of Summer Team A. He is an overpowering jerk and has no qualms about hitting his students. After their revival in chapter 50, he becomes the target of revenge by Summer Team A and is killed by all members aside from Ban who does not participate but does not attempt to stop his Team either.

== The Ryugu Shelter ==
The posthumous characters that get a main focus in the Ash arc. Their story is told primarily from the point of view of Mark Ibaraki, a comedian who recollects his days at the shelter on a diary that Hana and the others find in the underground shelter. The shelter's events lasted a few years after the strike of the meteor, but it halted due to the spread of the Acari X virus.

Mark Ibaraki (茨木 真亜久, Ibaraki Mark)
Voiced by: Kazuyuki Okitsu (anime) (Japanese); Jessie James Grelle (English)
The main character of the Ash arc, who is dead by the time is story is recounted. He is a ventriloquist recruited by Takashi to provide entertainment for the Ryugu Shelter along with Maria Miki. He is the last person to die inside the Ryugu Shelter and he seals off the freezer containing those infected with Acari X before dying.
Maria Miki (神酒 マリア, Miki Maria)
Voiced by: Minako Kotobuki (anime) (Japanese); Allison Sumrall (English)
A famous idol singer known as the "Angelic Voice" who was brought into Ryugu Shelter to provide comfort and entertainment. It was revealed that it was her that unwittingly spread the Acari X virus. Although she did not show symptoms of the disease, she was a carrier of the virus, and because many people attended her concerts they were unknowingly infected. She pulls everyone into the freezer with her singing and effectively sacrifices herself to prevent Acari X from spreading in the future.
Takeru Hino (火野 武留, Hino Takeru)
A famous baseball player who is recruited to provide entertainment for the shelter.
Takashi Sugurono (末黒野 貴士, Sugurono Takashi)
Voiced by: Sho Hayami (anime) (Japanese); John Gremillion (English)
Hana's father, and also revealed to be the "Takashi-sensei" of Summer Team A's past. He is the actual director calling all the shots in the shelter, although he is technically under the government heads. He kills himself by jumping into the incinerator fan while pulling all of the infected officials with him.
Miho Sugurono (末黒野 美帆, Sugurono Miho)
Hana's mother, who dies when she seals herself into a flooded section of the shelter.
The Director (Michitsuna Oda) (織田 道綱, Oda Michitsuna)
The director in name only. He is an actor hired as a stand-in for the actual higher ups who control the shelter behind the scenes along with Takashi.
Norikazu Kagami (各務 頼一, Kagami Norikazu)
A musician along with Miki Maria. He is brought in as a presenter to "speak in any occasion." He follows Maria into the freezer.
Sadao Saruwatari (猿渡 貞夫, Saruwatari Sadao)
A television engineer who facilitates all the videos. He reveals that all the news broadcast and baseball games were fabricated the shelter. He commits suicide after getting everybody infected into the freezer.
Tokidoki Sakata (坂田 時々, Sakata Tokidoki)
A manga artist who created the manga Wonderful Q. He dies from Acari X while finishing the ending to Wonderful Q.

== Kagijima Shelter ==
The posthumous residents of the Kagijima shelter located on Sado consisted of 50 volunteer tasked with ensuring the success of the "Open Sado Project". The story is told through a series of 3D holographic recordings shown to the main cast as the residents of the shelter.

Director Furuhashi

The Director of the Open Sado Project and in charge of the Kagijima shelter. He is the first resident introduced to the main cast as he is the one greeting the sponsors in the first recording of the Kagijima Shelter.

== Animals ==
As she did in her other previous works, Yumi Tamura displays many interactions between the protagonists and various animals who often play an important role in supporting the them, creating a deep connection between the characters and nature.

=== Aramaki's pack ===
Fubuki and Mitsuru-san had puppies with other dogs, leading to a population of almost a hundred who are scattered in several smaller packs all over Honshu. Their appearances vary. They are still attached to Aramaki although they do not always live with him anymore, so they come when he calls for them and do various tasks for him like hunting, guarding duty, following trails, or searching for water and food sources. Their help and support enabled Aramaki to survive in this world alone for 15 years.

==== Adult dogs ====
Fubuki

A male wolf-like dog companion of Aramaki's since he was a puppy, and named after the late Fubuki of Team Winter. His father was the nameless dog from Hokkaido who led Aramaki to safety after his other comrades perished. Fubuki was the Alpha Male of Aramaki's large pack of dogs. Fubuki, together with the rest of the adult dogs of Aramaki's pack, had been "infected" by the spores of mushroom in Chapter 119, resulting in death. Along with the rest of the adult dogs of the pack, he and the others intentionally set themselves ablaze and made a perimeter around the forest overrun with said mushroom to prevent any infected animals from leaving, and prevent the humans from entering.

Mitsuru-san

A female dog named after the late Mitsuru of Team Winter. She has accompanied Aramaki ever since she was a puppy. Her father was the nameless dog from Hokkaido who led Aramaki to safety after his other comrades perished. Mitsuru-san also seems to be the female alpha dog of Aramaki's entire pack. She perished with the rest of the adult dogs of the pack in the blaze which engulfs the forest in Chapter 119.

Derek

An adult male dog from Aramaki's pack. Derek leads the search team for Hana. He looks very wolf-like. His special feature are two white circles around the eyes. He perished in the blaze that engulfs the forest in Chapter 119.

==== Juvenile dogs ====
Kuroda

Often bullied by the other dogs, Ayu adopts him as her own dog as per Aramaki's suggestion. Kuroda licks her all over whenever he gets the opportunity. His fur is completely black; he looks like a mixture between Tibetan Terrier and Shih-poo.

Ball

He is hungry constantly and often trails off. However, in this way he was able to find Momota and deliver his call for help to Hana's team. Ball resembles a Laekenois, with scrubby light fur and black ears. He is very trusting, even of strangers.

==== Puppies ====
Diamond (Dai)

A puppy from the latest litter of Fubuki and Mitsuru-san. The brother of Battery. Very curious and reckless. Looks like a Tibetan Terrier, dark coat, fair muzzle and legs. When he and his brother went astray on an adventure tour, he finds Hana and warns her of a reptile closing in on her.

Battery (Batsu)

A puppy from the latest litter of Fubuki and Mitsuru-san. The brother of Diamond. Very curious and reckless. Looks like a Maltese, with fair coat, curled tail and snapped off ears. When he and his brother went astray on an adventure tour, he is being chased by a large reptile, but Hana rescues him just in time.

=== Summer B's animals ===
Macadamia Nuts (Nuts)

A tabby cat who was Natsu's pet in the past, before she was sent to the future. She deeply misses him.

Peanuts

A baby flesh eating rabbit. Natsu wanted to keep it as her pet and Arashi suggested its name. However, it was killed by Mozu in order to prevent it from attracting the rest of its pack.

Carol

A llama-alike animal with a very keen sense for edible and dangerous food. She was given as a present from Izayoi to Team Summer B as they parted from Team Autumn. Ever since then, her delicious milk and her sharp instincts have been a great help to Team Summer B. She's also strong and can carry heavy luggage, even persons. Not even travelling on a ship does pose a problem to her.

Moron Birds

Also referred to as Bakamarus, Arashi, Semimaru and Natsu at some point of the story discovered a round flightless kind of birds and decided to take in some of them as a supply of eggs and bird meat. Because they're so trusting to humans, the cynical Semimaru decides to call them Moron Birds.

Ice Turtles

During their adventure in the ghost ship Fuji, Arashi picked up a pair of turtles which had been preserved in a hibernation state. Which kind of turtles they are, whether they're actually alive (and whether they're really a male and a female) is still unknown, though.

=== Team Spring's animals ===
Cheeky Foal

A still nameless, cheeky young foal which got attached to Hana and sticks close to her after its mother's death. White, curly fur, very beautiful and cute, but an extremely stubborn child, too.

Boar Family

A little family of boars, consisting of the mother and four baby boars. They befriend Hana and protect her as she just woke up from her fall into the whirlpool. But they have to painfully separate again because Chisa unknowingly killed and cooked one of the young boars, resulting in Hana accidentally eating her little friend.

=== Team Autumn's animals ===
Guri and Gura

Two llama-alike animals with a keen sense for edible and dangerous food. They live with Team Autumn. The llamas' milk and sharp instincts have aided Team Autumn a great deal. The animals are also strong and can carry and pull heavy luggage and other objects.

=== Gengorou's animals ===
Gengorou took care of many different animal species since he was part of the animal class during Summer A's time of education. He loved them deeply and built up a strong relationship especially to Tango and Aoba, but during Summer A's test he had to kill most of them with his own hands because they became dangerous to his comrades. It broke his heart.

Aoba

A tame large male brown bear which was reared by Gengorou ever since he was a cub. He was very trusting towards humans and got quite attached to Gengorou. But during Team Summer A's test he was probably deliberately infected with rabies and tossed out in the middle of the mountains. Pained and puzzled, he attacked Koruri's team and took away one of Ukai's eyes. Ukai shot him several times in return and Aoba died slowly, suffering great pains.

Tango

A tame large male tiger which was reared by Gengorou ever since he was a cub. He was very trusting towards humans and got quite attached to Gengorou. But during Team Summer A's test he was probably deliberately infected with rabies and tossed out in the middle of the mountains. Pained and puzzled, he attacked and killed several Summer A candidates. Gengorou took responsibility and strangled him to death.

=== Other animals ===
Saber-toothed tiger

A large saber-toothed tiger alike cat who killed several members of Team Winter. But after being killed by Aramaki, it turned out that the tiger also was just a mother who did her best to feed her cub. The cub ran away from Aramaki and was probably killed in the flame of the bushfire.

Ten-ten

A cute little dog owned by Maria. She brought it along with her into Ryugu Shelter, but Takashi took it away and quarantined it because he thought Ten-ten might be the "hidden carrier" of Acari X – a seemingly healthy parasite host showing no symptoms of illness, but infecting those around him. The dog was never seen again; he probably got disposed of. This entire thing caused Maria great grief. Ten-ten's fur was completely black; his appearance resembled a Shih-poo.
