= Jessie James Grelle =

American voice actor

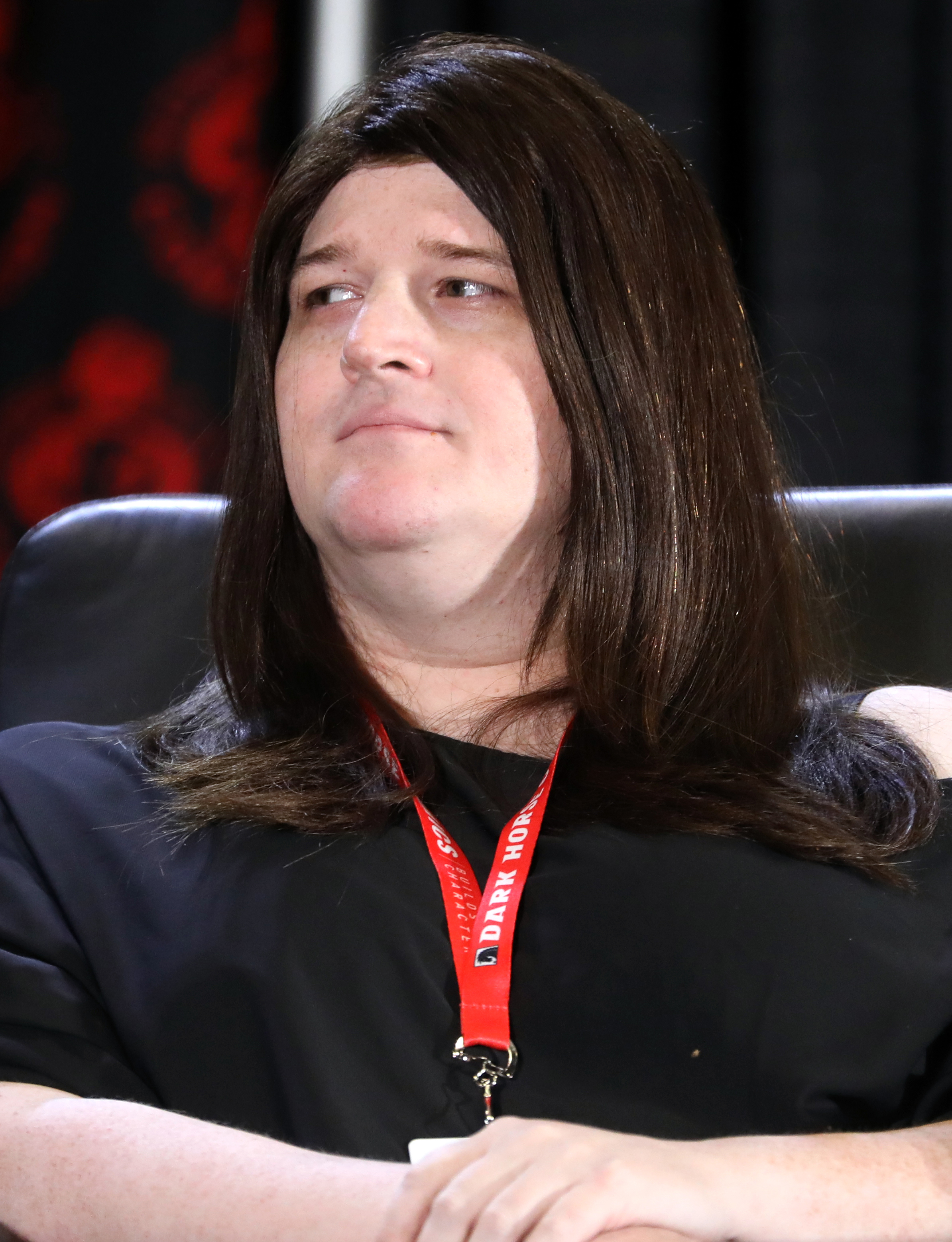
- Grelle in 2024
- Born: Joshua James Ervin Grelle
- Occupations: Voice actor; ADR script writer; VTuber (As Mimcubus)
- Years active: 2005–present
- Spouse: Joanna Beatty (m. 2017)

Jessie James Grelle (/ˈɡriːli/, GREE-lee; born Joshua James Ervin Grelle) is an American voice actor and ADR script writer in English language dubs of Japanese anime. They (Note: Grelle uses the pronouns they/them and she/her. This article uses they/them for consistency.) are known for voicing numerous main characters in the harem genre. They voiced Tsuzuru Minagi in the anime series A3!. Major roles include Nobuchika Ginoza in Psycho-Pass, Armin Arlert in Attack on Titan, Itsuki Takeuchi in Initial D, Fumikage Tokoyami in My Hero Academia, Byakuya Togami in Danganronpa, Teruhiko Yukimura in Classroom of the Elite, Glenn Radars in Akashic Records of Bastard Magic Instructor, Kenichi Shirahama in Kenichi: The Mightiest Disciple, Mao Sadou / Demon King Satan in The Devil Is a Part-Timer! and Yuri Katsuki in Yuri on Ice!!!. Grelle has voiced lead characters Zen Wisteria in Snow White with the Red Hair, Kyohei Takano in The Wallflower, Komatsu in Toriko, Akihisa Yoshii in Baka and Test, Koichi Hayase in Linebarrels of Iron, Kazuya Aoi in Freezing, Tasuku Yamane in Trickster, Yuki "Yukiteru" Amano in The Future Diary, Atsushi Hatake in Big Windup!, Shido Itsuka in the Date A Live series, Futaro Uesugi in The Quintessential Quintuplets, Masamune in Masamune-kun's Revenge, Yamato Naoe in Majikoi!, Touya in In Another World With My Smartphone, Ichika Orimura in Infinite Stratos, and Issei Hyodo in High School DxD: BorN and the 4th season, titled Hero. In video games, they have voiced Ludger Kresnik in Tales of Xillia 2, Phog from Xenoblade Chronicles X and Xbalanque from Smite.

== Personal life ==
Grelle has one younger brother. In 2017, Grelle married Joanna Grelle (née Beatty).

In 2021, Grelle previously came out as non-binary. In March 2023, Grelle came out on social media as transgender, stated that they use they or she pronouns and also identifies as a lesbian.

== Filmography ==
=== Anime ===
List of dubbing performances in anime
Year	Title	Role	Notes	Source
2007	The Wallflower	Kyohei Takano		
2009	Big Windup!	Atsushi Hatake		
2009	Kenichi: The Mightiest Disciple	Kenichi Shirahama		
2009–15	Hetalia: Axis Powers series	Lithuania		
2010	Linebarrels of Iron	Koichi Hayase		
2010	Panty & Stocking with Garterbelt	Abrams		
2010	Soul Eater	Ox Ford	Also Soul Eater Not!	
2010–11	Baka and Test	Akihisa Yoshii		
2010–11	Initial D	Itsuki Takeuchi	Funimation dub	
2011	Black Butler	King Edward V		
2011	Majikoi!	Yamato Naoe		
2011	Rideback	Kenji Ogata		
2011–13	Infinite Stratos	Ichika Orimura		
2012	Princess Jellyfish	Kuranosuke Koibuchi		
2012	Tsuritama	Akira Yamada		
2013	Another	Tomohiko Kazami		
2013	Brothers Conflict	Azusa Asahina		
2013	Diabolik Lovers	Subaru Sakamaki		
2013	Freezing	Kazuya Aoi		
2013	Future Diary	Yukiteru Amano		
2013	Mysterious Girlfriend X	Akira Tsubaki		
2013	Shakugan no Shana	Yuji Sakai	Season 2 onwards	
2013	Tenchi Muyo! War on Geminar	Ceres Taito		
2013	Toriko	Komatsu		
2013–18	Free!	Aichiro Nitori		
2013–present	The Devil Is a Part-Timer!	Mao Sadao/Demon King Satan		
2014	Fairy Tail	Hughes		
2014	Problem Children are Coming from Another World, aren't they?	Izayoi Sakamaki		
2014–15	Psycho-Pass	Nobuchika Ginoza		
2014–24	Attack on Titan	Armin Arlert	Also Attack on Titan: Junior High	
2014–present	Date A Live	Shido Itsuka		
2015	Danganronpa: The Animation	Byakuya Togami		
2015	Death Parade	Harada	2 episodes	
2015	Hyperdimension Neptunia: The Animation	Trick		
2015	Mikagura School Suite	Sadamatsu Minatogawa		
2015	Tokyo Ravens	Tenma Momoe		
2015	Yona of the Dawn	Zeno		
2015–present	High School DxD	Issei Hyodo	Season 3 - present, replaces Scott Freeman	
2016	Danganronpa 3: The End of Hope's Peak High School	Byakuya Togami		
2016	Drifters	Toyohisa Shimazu		
2016	Grimgar of Fantasy and Ash	Og	Episode: "Between Life and Death"	
2016	Puzzle & Dragons X	Ace		
2016	ReLIFE	Ryō Yoake		
2016	Shimoneta	Tanukichi Okuma		
2016	Snow White with the Red Hair	Zen Wisteria	Season 2 & OVA	
2016	Trickster	Tasuku Yamane		
2016	The Vision of Escaflowne	Reeden	Funimation redub	
2016	Yuri on Ice	Yuri Katsuki, Stéphane Lambiel		
2016–25	My Hero Academia	Fumikage Tokoyami / Tsukuyomi		
2017	Akashic Records of Bastard Magic Instructor	Glenn Radars		
2017	The Ancient Magus' Bride	Cartaphilius		
2017	In Another World With My Smartphone	Touya Mochizuki	Season 1	
2017	Recovery of an MMO Junkie	Yuta Sakurai		
2017–21	Black Clover	William Vangeance		
2017–23	Masamune-kun's Revenge	Masamune Makabe		
2018	Dragon Ball Super	Grand Minister		
2018	Tada Never Falls in Love	Mitsuyoshi Tada		
2019	7 Seeds	Mark Ibaraki		
2019	Astra Lost in Space	Kanata Hoshijima		
2019	My Roommate Is a Cat	Atsushi Kawase		
2019	The Quintessential Quintuplets	Futaro Uesugi		
2019	Stars Align	Toma Shinjo		
2019–22	Haikyu!!	Tendō Satori		
2019–present	Demon Lord, Retry!	Hakuto Kunai/Akira Ono		
2019–present	Dr. Stone	Kinro		
2020	ID - Invaded	Akihito Narihisago/Sakaido		
2021	Full Dive	Bob		
2021–23	Vinland Saga	Canute	Sentai and Crunchyroll dubs	
2022	Given	Ritsuka Uenoyama		
2023	One Piece	Kawamatsu	Episode 590	
2024	Fairy Tail: 100 Years Quest	Wraith		
2024	Viral Hit	Woo Ji-hyuk		
2025	The Beginning After the End	Rey		
2026	Sentenced to Be a Hero	Venetim		

=== Animation ===
List of voice performances in animation
Year	Title	Role	Notes	Source
2016–present	RWBY	Tyrian Callows		

=== Film ===
List of voice performances in film
Year	Title	Role	Notes	Source
2013	Blood-C: The Last Dark	Shun Fujimura		
2013	Shakugan no Shana the Movie	Yuji Sakai		
2016	The Boy and the Beast	Jiromaru		
2016	Psycho-Pass: The Movie	Nobuchika Ginoza		
2018	My Hero Academia: Two Heroes	Fumikage Tokoyami		
2020	My Hero Academia: Heroes Rising	Fumikage Tokoyami		
2021	My Hero Academia: World Heroes' Mission	Fumikage Tokoyami		
2021	The Stranger by the Shore	Shun Hashimoto		
2022	The Quintessential Quintuplets Movie	Futaro Uesugi		
2023	Psycho-Pass: Sinners of the System - Crime and Punishment	Nobuchika Ginoza		
2023	Psycho-Pass Providence	Nobuchika Ginoza		
2024	Haikyu!! The Dumpster Battle	Tendō Satori		
2024	My Hero Academia: You're Next	Fumikage Tokoyami		

=== Video games ===
List of voice performances in video games
Year	Title	Role	Notes	Source
2011	Dragon Ball Z: Ultimate Tenkaichi	Hero (Energetic)		
2014	Neverending Nightmares	Thomas		
2014	Tales of Xillia 2	Ludger Will Kresnik/Victor		
2014	Smite	Xbalanque		
2015	Dragon Ball Xenoverse	Demigra		
2015	Xenoblade Chronicles X	Phog		
2017	Paladins	Enforcer Fernando		
2018	Dragon Ball Xenoverse 2	Demigra	Infinite History DLC	
2022	Freedom Planet 2	Captain Kalaw		
2025	Xenoblade Chronicles X: Definitive Edition	Phog, Kato		
2025	Fire Emblem Heroes	Ogma	Ogma: Former Gladiator	
