= Suzuko Hara =

Japanese actress (born 2005)

- 原 涼子
- Born: 27 April 2005 (age 21)
- Occupation: Actress
- Years active: 2010–present
- Notable work: Barakamon as Naru Kotoishi; The Idolmaster Cinderella Girls as Hijiri Mochizuki
- Website: http://suzukohara.com/

Suzuko Hara (原 涼子, Hara Suzuko; born 27 April 2005) is a Japanese actress from Yokosuka. After starring in several television dramas, she later moved towards voice acting, portraying Naru Kotoishi in Barakamon and Hijiri Mochizuki in The Idolmaster Cinderella Girls.

== Biography ==
Suzuko Hara, a native of Yokosuka, was born on 27 April 2005. After appearing in the 2010 TV series Yōkame no Semi, she began appearing in dramas, and she was part of the regular cast of Double Tone, Kami no Tsuki, Oniichan, Gacha, and Yutori desu ga Nani ka.

In June 2013, she starred as Myra in Lexus' A Better Tomorrow live-action animated shorts. In September 2014, she began voicing Pero in Ganbare! Lulu Lolo: Tiny Twin Bears. In February 2017, she was cast as Peso in Akindo Sei no Little Peso. In July 2019, she was cast as No-chan in the Kaiju Step Wandabada shorts as part of the Ultraman franchise.

In 2014, she portrayed Naru Kotoishi, one of the main characters of the anime Barakamon. Since Naru speaks the local dialect of the anime's main setting, the Gotō Islands, Satsuki Yoshino (the creator of Barakamon) originally intended to use standard Japanese for the anime due to the difficulty of speaking the dialect. However, Hara, who was then nine years old, was so good at speaking the dialect, Yoshino decided to instead have the dialect used in the anime. Real Sound described her as "the one person that fans of the anime cannot help but remember".

On 22 December 2022, it was announced that she would play the role of Hijiri Mochizuki in The Idolmaster Cinderella Girls: Starlight Stage. The same day, Barakamon subsequently trended on Twitter.

== Filmography ==
=== Anime television ===
2014

- Barakamon, Naru Kotoishi
- Ganbare! Lulu Lolo: Tiny Twin Bears, Pero

2017

- Akindo Sei no Little Peso, Peso

2019

- Kaiju Step Wandabada, No-chan

2027

- Glasses with a Chance of Delinquent, Hiro Momose

=== Original net animation ===
2013

- A Better Tomorrow, Myra

=== Video games ===
2022

- The Idolmaster Cinderella Girls: Starlight Stage, Hijiri Mochizuki

=== Live-action television ===
2010

- Yōkame no Semi, Miki

2011

- Mitori no Isha
- Soredemo, Ikite yuku, Yūri Kusama

2012

- Seinaru Kaibutsu-tachi, Chiaki Tokuda
- Tokkan: Tokubetsu Kokuzei Chōshū-kan, young Yōko Shirakawa

2013

- Double Tone, Ami Tamura
- Hiroshima Fukkō o Yumemita Otoko-tachi, girl exposed to the atomic bomb
- Kanata no Ko
- Real Onigokko, young Ai Satō
- Takanashi-san, Watashi no Ron-chan

2014

- Bitter Blood, Chikako Inagi
- Garo: Makai no Hana, Karina (girl)
- Kami no Tsuki, Chikage Okazaki
- Last Doctor, young Sanae Yoshida
- Saikō no Omotenashi, Ai
- Time Spiral (2014 TV series), child in wheelchair
- Yabai Kenji, Yukino Isonuma

2015

- Bushi no Musume, young Etsuko
- Kodomo Anzen Real Story, abducted child
- Oniichan, Gacha, Yotsuba Mitarai
- Red Cross: On'na-tachi no Akagami, Yōshō no Kidai

2016

- Kidnap Tour, Chizu
- IQ246: Kareinaru Jikenbo
- Obama Daitōryō no Oridzuru, Sadako Sasaki
- Yutori desu ga Nani ka, Ryōko Saotome

2017

- Ashita no Yakusoku, young Hinata
- Kajitsu no Nai Mori, young Miyuki Etō

=== Live-action film ===
2012

- A Terminal Trust

2013

- Shield of Straw, girl

2014

- Kiki's Delivery Service, young Kiki

2016

- Night's Tightrope, young Atsuko Kusano

2017

- Bokyo
