= Clint Bickham =

American voice actor and writer

- Occupations: Voice actor, scriptwriter
- Years active: 2003–present

Clint Bickham is an American voice actor and ADR script writer. After collaborating with illustrator Priscilla Hamby on Devil's Candy, which was featured in the first volume of Rising Stars of Manga, he also worked for the manga publisher Tokyopop, writing the English adaptations of manga such as Domo and Jyu-Oh-Sei. Bickham is best known for his roles of Akihito Kanbara in Beyond the Boundary, Finland in Hetalia: Axis Powers, Renji Aso in Ef: A Fairy Tale of the Two, Mochizo Oji in Tamako Market, Teichi Niya in Dusk Maiden of Amnesia, Haru in Tsuritama, Luca in La storia della Arcana Famiglia, and Ikki Kurogane in Chivalry of a Failed Knight.

== Anime ==
Year	Title	Role	Notes	Source
2007	Air Gear	Kazuma Mikura		
2008	Special A	Sui Takishima, Hajime Kake, Yahiro Saiga		
2010–present	Hetalia	Finland		
2012	Ef: A Fairy Tale of the Two	Renji Aso		
2013	Dusk Maiden of Amnesia	Teichi Niya		
2013	Kokoro Connect	Yoshifumi Aoki		
2013	La storia della Arcana Famiglia	Luca		
2013	Tsuritama	Haru		
2014	From the New World	Shun Aonuma		
2014	Gatchaman Crowds	O.D	also Gatchaman Crowds insight	
2014	Sunday Without God	Hardy	ep 7–8	
2014	Tamako Market	Mochizo		
2014	Watamote	Suzuki		
2014	Haikyu!!	Kenma Kozume, Kiyoomi Sakusa		
2015	Akame ga Kill!	Nyau		
2015	Beyond the Boundary	Akihito Kanbara		
2017	Chivalry of a Failed Knight	Ikki Kurogane		
2018	Tsurune	Nanao Kisaragi		
2020	Shirobako	Yutaka Honda		
2021	Shikizakura	Kippei Nagatsu		
2023	The Dangers in My Heart	Kyotaro Ichikawa		
2025	From Bureaucrat to Villainess: Dad's Been Reincarnated!	Lucas		
2025	Flower and Asura	Akiyama		

== Production credits ==
=== Manga adaptation ===
- Domo
- Eensy Weensy Monster
- Future Diary
- Hetalia Axis Powers (volumes 1–5)
- Maria Holic
- Jyu-Oh-Sei
- Speed Grapher
